= 2019–20 Ulster Rugby season =

Ulster Rugby
- 2019–20 season
- Head Coach: Dan McFarland
- Operations Director: Bryn Cunningham
- Captain: Iain Henderson
- Pro14: Final
- European Rugby Champions Cup: Quarter-final
- Top try scorer: League: Matt Faddes (6); All: John Cooney (10)
- Top points scorer: League: John Cooney (96); All: John Cooney (180)
Home colours	Away colours	Third colours

The 2019–20 season was Ulster's 26th season since the advent of professionalism in rugby union, and Dan McFarland's second season as head coach. Lock Iain Henderson was named captain in place of retired hooker Rory Best. They competed in the Pro14 and the European Rugby Champions Cup. Both competitions were disrupted by the COVID-19 pandemic, the later stages being played in August, September and October 2020. In the Pro14, Ulster finished second in Conference A, making the playoffs and qualifying for next season's Champions Cup. They beat Edinburgh in the semi-final, but lost to Leinster in the final. They finished second in Pool 3 in the Champions Cup, qualifying for the quarter-finals, where they were beaten by Toulouse.

Academy players who made their debuts this season included centre Stewart Moore and wing Ethan McIlroy. Ulster led the league in defence. Scrum-half John Cooney and centre Stuart McCloskey made the Pro14 Dream Team. Cooney and number eight Marcell Coetzee were nominated for European Player of the Year. Cooney was leading scorer with 180 and leading try scorer with ten, and was named Ulster's Player of the Year.

== Events ==
=== Personnel changes ===
New signings were Australian lock Sam Carter, from the Brumbies; Ireland and Lions prop Jack McGrath, from Leinster; New Zealand wing Matt Faddes, from the Highlanders; South African-born, Irish-qualified prop Gareth Milasinovich, from Worcester Warriors; former Ireland U20 out-half Bill Johnston, from Munster; and lock David O'Connor, from Lansdowne, joining his older brother Alan at Ulster on a development contract.

Players leaving included flanker Caleb Montgomery to Worcester Warriors, wing David Busby to the Seattle Seawolves, out-half Johnny McPhillips to Leicester Tigers, and lock Alex Thompson to Jersey Reds. Utility back Peter Nelson and wing Jack Owens were released. Centre Darren Cave retired, and so did hooker Rory Best after captaining Ireland at the 2019 World Cup. Iain Henderson was named Ulster's new captain in Best's place.

Six new players joined the academy: wing Aaron Sexton, from Bangor Grammar School; wing Conor Rankin, from Campbell College; hooker Tom Stewart, last seasons' Ulster Schools Player of the Season, from Belfast Royal Academy; Irish-qualified centre Hayden Hyde, from Harlequins academy; prop Callum Reid, from Banbridge RFC; and wing Ethan McIlroy, who joined in January 2020, from Methodist College Belfast.

Scrum coach Aaron Dundon, strength and conditioning coach Kevin Geary and GPS analyst Chris Hagan left the province's support staff.

=== Rugby World Cup ===
Three Ulster players were named in the initial Ireland squad for the 2019 Rugby World Cup: hooker Rory Best, captaining the team for his last tournament before retiring, lock Iain Henderson, and wing Jacob Stockdale. Flanker Jordi Murphy and hooker Rob Herring were later called up to replace the injured Jack Conan and Seán Cronin.

=== Season ===
With Iain Henderson away with Ireland at the World Cup, Rob Herring was named stand-in captain. When Herring was called up to the World Cup due to injury, the captaincy went to Billy Burns.

The pool stage of the Champions Cup was completed in January 2020, with Ulster finishing second in Pool 3 and qualifying for the quarter-finals.

The 2020 Six Nations Championship began in February 2020. Seven Ulster players, Ian Henderson, Rob Herring, Tom O'Toole, Will Addison, Billy Burns, John Cooney and Jacob Stokdale, were called up for Ireland. Robert Baloucoune included in the training squad as a development player. Stockdale, Henderson, Herring and Cooney appeared in the first three games, before the tournament was suspended due to the COVID-19 pandemic.

Ulster's away game against Benetton in the Pro14, scheduled for 29 February 2020, was postponed due to the COVID-19 pandemic, and later recorded as a 0–0 draw. The rest of the season was suspended on 12 March. The knockout stage of the Champions Cup was also postponed.

The Pro14 season resumed in August, the regular season reduced from 21 games to 15, with matches played behind closed doors.

Scrum-half Alby Mathewson and out-half Ian Madigan joined in the summer, and were able to play in these late-season matches, but Ulster were docked a point in the Pro14 table as Madigan played two games before he was properly registered with his new club. Ulster finished second in Conference A and qualified for the playoffs. They beat Edinburgh in the semi-final, but lost to Leinster in the final. The knockout stages of the Champions Cup resumed in September, and Ulster went out in the quarter-finals to Toulouse.

The Six Nations resumed in October. The Ireland squad included four Ulster players, Iain Henderson, Rob Herring, Stuart McCloskey and Jacob Stockdale, and Herring and Stockdale both played in the last two matches.

Academy players Stewart Moore, Azur Allison and Ethan McIlroy made their senior debuts this season.

Ulster had the highest home attendance in the Pro14, averaging 15,295, and led the league in defence. They were fourth in attendance in the Champions Cup, averaging 17,024.

=== Post-season ===
Inside centre Stuart McCloskey and scrum-half John Cooney were named on the Pro14 Dream Team. Cooney and number 8 Marcell Coetzee made the longlist for EPCR European Player of the Year.

At the Ulster Rugby Awards, John Cooney was named Player of the Year. Marcell Coetzee won Personality of the Year, Supporters' Club Player of the Year, and Rugby Writers' Player of the Year. Tom O'Toole was Young Player of the Year.

== Staff ==
Position	Name	Nationality
Chief executive officer	Jonny Petrie	Scotland
Operations Director	Bryn Cunningham	Ireland
Head coach	Dan McFarland	England
Attack Coach	Dwayne Peel	Wales
Defence Coach	Jared Payne	Ireland
Forwards Coach	Roddy Grant	Scotland
Skills Coach	Dan Soper	New Zealand

== Squad ==
=== Senior squad ===
==== Players in ====
- (Australia) Sam Carter from (Australia) Brumbies
- (New Zealand) Matt Faddes from (New Zealand) Highlanders
- (Ireland) Bill Johnston from (Ireland) Munster
- (Ireland) Ian Madigan from (England) Bristol Bears
- (New Zealand) Alby Mathewson unattached
- (Ireland) Jack McGrath from (Ireland) Leinster
- (South Africa) Gareth Milasinovich from (England) Worcester Warriors
- (Ireland) David O'Connor from (Ireland) Lansdowne

==== Promoted from academy ====
- (Ireland) Robert Baloucoune
- (Ireland) James Hume
- (Ireland) Angus Kernohan
- (Ireland) Michael Lowry
- (Ireland) Zack McCall
- (Ireland) Eric O'Sullivan
- (Ireland) Marcus Rea

==== Players out ====
- (Ireland) Alan Bennie released
- (Ireland) Rory Best retired
- (Ireland) David Busby to (United States) Seattle Seawolves
- (Ireland) Darren Cave retired
- (Ireland) Matthew Dalton released
- (South Africa) Wiehahn Herbst to (South Africa) Bulls
- (Ireland) Johnny McPhillips to (England) Leicester Tigers
- (Ireland) Caleb Montgomery to (England) Worcester Warriors
- (Ireland) Ian Nagle to (Italy) Zebre
- (Canada) Peter Nelson released
- (Ireland) Jack Owens released
- (Australia) Henry Speight to (Australia) Brumbies
- (Ireland) Alex Thompson to Jersey Reds

Ulster Rugby squad
**Props**: (Ireland) Eric O'Sullivan (18 apps, 10 starts); (Ireland) **Marty Moore** (16 apps, 13 starts); (Ireland) **Jack McGrath** (15 apps, 12 starts); (Ireland) Tom O'Toole (22 apps, 10 starts, 10 pts); (Ireland) Andrew Warwick (3 apps, 1 start); (Ireland) Ross Kane (8 apps); (Ireland) Kyle McCall (8 apps, 1 (yellow card) ); (South Africa) Gareth Milasinovich* (no apps); (Ireland) Tommy O'Hagan (no apps); **Hookers**: (Ireland) **Rob Herring** (18 apps, 18 starts, 25 pts, 1 (yellow card) ); (Ireland) Adam McBurney (12 appearances, 4 starts, 5 pts, 1 (yellow card) ); (Ireland) John Andrew (12 apps, 1 start, 5 pts); (Ireland) Zack McCall (no apps); **Locks**: (Ireland) Alan O'Connor (22 apps, 18 starts, 5 pts); (Ireland) **Kieran Treadwell** (19 apps, 11 starts); (Ireland) **Iain Henderson** (c) (9 apps, 9 starts); (Australia) **Sam Carter** (12 apps, 7 starts, 5 pts); (Ireland) David O'Connor (7 apps, 1 start); (Ireland) Jack Regan (1 app)	**Back row**: (South Africa) **Marcell Coetzee** (17 apps, 17 starts, 5 pts); (Ireland) **Sean Reidy** (19 apps, 16 starts, 10 pts); (Ireland) Matty Rea (19 apps, 14 starts, 10 pts); (Ireland) **Jordi Murphy** (15 apps, 13 starts, 5 pts); (Ireland) Nick Timoney (14 apps, 7 starts, 10 pts); (Ireland) Greg Jones (4 apps, 2 starts, 15pts, 1 (yellow card) ); (Ireland) Clive Ross (2 apps); (Ireland) Marcus Rea (1 app); (Ireland) Azur Allison (1 app); **Scrum-halves**: (Ireland) **John Cooney** (20 apps, 18 starts, 180 pts); (Ireland) David Shanahan (15 apps, 4 starts, 10 pts); (New Zealand) **Alby Mathewson** (4 apps, 1 start); (Ireland) Johnny Stewart (2 apps, 5 pts); **Fly-halves**: (England) Billy Burns* (16 apps, 16 starts, 22 pts); (Ireland) Bill Johnston (11 apps, 5 starts, 39 pts); (Zimbabwe) Angus Curtis* (6 apps, 2 starts); (Ireland) **Ian Madigan** (4 apps, 1 start, 7 pts)	**Centres**: (Ireland) **Stuart McCloskey** (17 apps, 17 starts, 15 pts); (Ireland) **Luke Marshall** (16 apps, 16 starts, 15 pts, 1 (yellow card) ); (Ireland) James Hume (10 apps, 9 starts, 10 pts); (Ireland) **Will Addison** (8 apps, 8 starts, 5 pts); (Ireland) Stewart Moore (2 apps); **Wings**: (Ireland) **Jacob Stockdale** (13 apps, 13 starts, 10 pts); (New Zealand) Matt Faddes (14 apps, 10 starts, 35 pts, 1 (yellow card) ); (Ireland) Rob Lyttle (10 apps, 10 starts, 15 pts); (Ireland) **Craig Gilroy** (15 apps, 8 starts, 20 pts, 1 (yellow card) ); (Ireland) Robert Baloucoune (8 apps, 7 starts, 25 pts); (Ireland) Angus Kernohan (3 apps, 1 start, 5 pts); **Fullbacks**: (South Africa) Louis Ludik* (16 apps, 12 starts); (Ireland) Michael Lowry (7 apps, 3 starts); (Ireland) Ethan McIlroy (1 app)
(c) denotes the team captain, **Bold** denotes internationally capped players. Italics denotes academy players who appeared in the senior team.^{*} denotes players qualified to play for Ireland on residency or dual nationality. Players and their allocated positions from the Ulster Rugby website.

=== Academy squad ===
==== Players in ====
- (Ireland) Ethan McIlroy from (Ireland) Methodist College Belfast.
- (Ireland) Tom Stewart from (Ireland) Belfast Royal Academy
- (Ireland) Aaron Sexton from (Ireland) Bangor Grammar School
- (Ireland) Callum Reid from (Ireland) Banbridge RFC;
- (Ireland) Conor Rankin from (Ireland) Campbell College
- (England) Hayden Hyde from (England) Harlequins academy

Ulster Rugby Academy squad (Note: Taking into account signings and departures head of 2019–20 season as listed on List of 2019–20 Pro14 transfers.)
**Props**: (Ireland) Callum Reid **(1)**; **Hookers**: (Ireland) Tom Stewart **(1)**; **Locks**: (Ireland) Matthew Dalton **(3)**; (Ireland) Jack Regan **(3)** (1 app)	**Back row**: (Ireland) Matthew Agnew **(2)**; (Ireland) Azur Allison **(2)** (1 app); (Ireland) Joe Dunleavy **(3)**; (Ireland) Aaron Hall **(4)**; (Ireland) David McCann **(2)**; **Scrum-halves**: (Zimbabwe) Graham Curtis* **(3)**; **Fly-halves**: (Ireland) Bruce Houston **(2)**	**Centres**: (England) Hayden Hyde* **(1)**; (Ireland) Stewart Moore **(2)** (2 apps); **Wings**: (Ireland) Iwan Hughes **(2)**; (Ireland) Conor Rankin **(1)**; (Ireland) Aaron Sexton **(1)**; **Fullbacks**: (Ireland) Ethan McIlroy **(1)** (1 app)
(c) denotes the team captain, **Bold** denotes internationally capped players, number in brackets indicates players stage in the three-year academy cycle.^{*} denotes players qualified to play for Ireland on residency or dual nationality. Players and their allocated positions from the Ulster Rugby website.

== Season record ==
Competition	Played	Won	Drawn	Lost	PF	PA	PD	TF	TA
2019-20 Champions Cup	7	5	0	2	137	143	-6	16	10
2019-20 Pro14	17	9	1	7	412	352	60	54	46
Total	24	14	1	9	549	495	54	70	56

== European Rugby Champions Cup ==
=== Pool 3 ===
Team	P	W	D	L	PF	PA	Diff	TF	TA	TB	LB	Pts
(France) Clermont (4)	6	5	0	1	207	114	93	24	15	3	1	24
(Ireland) Ulster (6)	6	5	0	1	129	107	22	16	10	1	0	21
(England) Harlequins	6	2	0	4	114	166	–52	13	20	0	2	10
(England) Bath	6	0	0	6	102	165	–63	12	20	1	4	5

16 November 2019	(1 BP) Bath (England)	16–17	(Ireland) Ulster	Recreation Ground, Bath
16:00	Try: Gabriel Hamer-Webb 60' c Con: Freddie Burns (1/1) 61'; Pen: Freddie Burns (2/2) 25', 29'; Rhys Priestland (1/2) 66'	Report; Highights; Full game	Try: John Cooney 13' c Rob Lyttle 57' c Con: John Cooney (2/2) 14', 58'; Pen: John Cooney (1/2) 70'	Attendance: 13,289; Referee: Manuel Bottino (FIR)
Ulster lineup: 1. Jack McGrath, 2. Rob Herring, 3. Marty Moore, 4. Iain Henderson, 5. Sam Carter, 6. Matty Rea, 7. Jordi Murphy, 8. Marcell Coetzee, 9. John Cooney, 10. Billy Burns, 11. Jacob Stockdale, 12. Stuart McCloskey, 13. Luke Marshall, 14. Rob Lyttle, 15. Will Addison.; Replacements: 16. Adam McBurney, 17. Eric O'Sullivan (for McGrath 7'), 18. Tom O'Toole (for Moore, 63'), 19. Alan O'Connor (for Carter 24'), 20. Sean Reidy (for Matty Rea 51'), 21. David Shanahan, 22. Angus Curtis (for Burns 59'), 23. Louis Ludik (for Lyttle, 63').				Attendance: 13,289; Referee: Manuel Bottino (FIR)

22 November 2019	Ulster (Ireland)	18–13	(France) Clermont (1 BP)	Ravenhill Stadium, Belfast
19:45	Try: Jordi Murphy 17' c John Cooney 62' m Con: John Cooney (1/2) 18'; Pen: John Cooney (2/2) 2', 36'	Report; Highlights; Full game	Try: Penalty try 71'; Pen: Greig Laidlaw (2/3) 32', 61'	Attendance: 15,466; Referee: JP Doyle (RFU)
Ulster lineup: 1. Eric O'Sullivan, 2. Rob Herring, 3. Marty Moore, 4. Alan O'Connor, 5. Iain Henderson, 6. Sean Reidy, 7. Jordi Murphy, 8. Marcell Coetzee, 9. John Cooney, 10. Billy Burns, 11. Jacob Stockdale, 12. Stuart McCloskey, 13. Luke Marshall, 14. Louis Ludik, 15. Will Addison.; Replacements: 16. Adam McBurney, 17. Kyle McCall (for O'Sullivan, 66'), 18. Tom O'Toole (for Moore, 66'), 19. Kieran Treadwell (for O'Connor, 57'), 20. Nick Timoney (for Reidy, 61'), 21. David Shanahan, 22. Bill Johnston (for Burns, 68'), 23. Craig Gilroy.				Attendance: 15,466; Referee: JP Doyle (RFU)

7 December 2019	Ulster (Ireland)	25–24	(England) Harlequins (1 BP)	Ravenhill Stadium, Belfast
15:15	Try: Sean Reidy 31' c Stuart McCloskey 43' m Adam McBurney 66' c Con: John Cooney (2/3) 32', 66'; Pen: John Cooney (2/2) 7', 78'	Report; Highlights; Full game	Try: Alex Dombrandt 24' c Elia Elia (2) 56' c, 59' c Con: Marcus Smith (3/3) 25', 58', 60'; Pen: Marcus Smith (1/2) 9'	Attendance: 17,923; Referee: Mike Adamson (SRU)
Ulster lineup: 1. Eric O'Sullivan, 2. Rob Herring, 3. Marty Moore, 4. Alan O'Connor, 5. Iain Henderson, 6. Sean Reidy, 7. Jordi Murphy, 8. Marcell Coetzee, 9. John Cooney, 10. Billy Burns, 11. Craig Gilroy, 12. Stuart McCloskey, 13. Luke Marshall, 14. Louis Ludik, 15. Jacob Stockdale.; Replacements: 16. Adam McBurney (for Herring, 60'), 17. Andrew Warwick, 18. Tom O'Toole (for Moore, 73'), 19. Kieran Treadwell (for O'Connor, 58'), 20. Matty Rea (for Coetzee, 60'), 21. David Shanahan, 22. Bill Johnston, 23. Matt Faddes (for Gilroy, 73').				Attendance: 17,923; Referee: Mike Adamson (SRU)

13 December 2019	Harlequins (England)	10–34	(Ireland) Ulster (1 BP)	Twickenham Stoop, London
19:45	Try: Stephan Lewies 61' c Con: James Lang (1/1) 62'; Pen: James Lang (1/1) 34'	Report; Highlights; Full game	Try: John Cooney (2) 38' c, 58' c Marshall 46' c Faddes 75' m O'Toole 78' m Con: John Cooney (3/4) 40', 47', 59'; Pen: John Cooney (1/1) 6'	Attendance: 13,808; Referee: Alexandre Ruiz (FFR)
Ulster lineup: 1. Eric O'Sullivan, 2. Rob Herring, 3. Marty Moore, 4. Kieran Treadwell, 5. Iain Henderson, 6. Sean Reidy, 7. Jordi Murphy, 8. Marcell Coetzee, 9. John Cooney, 10. Billy Burns, 11. Louis Ludik, 12. Stuart McCloskey, 13. Luke Marshall, 14. Matt Faddes, 15. Jacob Stockdale.; Replacements: 16. Adam McBurney (for Herring, 66'), 17. Andrew Warwick (for O'Sullivan, 71'), 18. Tom O'Toole (for Moore, 34'), 19. Alan O'Connor (for Treadwell, 49'), 20. Matty Rea (for Reidy, 49'), 21. David Shanahan (for Cooney, 76'), 22. Bill Johnston (for Burns, 62'), 23. Craig Gilroy (for Ludik, 73').				Attendance: 13,808; Referee: Alexandre Ruiz (FFR)

11 January 2020	Clermont (France)	29–13	(Ireland) Ulster	Stade Marcel-Michelin, Clermont-Ferrand
13:00	Try: Alivereti Raka 48' c George Moala 76' c Con: Morgan Parra (1/1) 49'; Greig Laidlaw (1/1) 77'; Pen: Morgan Parra (3/4) 18', 40'+1, 67'; Greig Laidlaw (1/1) 71'; Drop: Camille Lopez (1/1) 6'; Cards: Parra (yellow card) 22'	Report; Highlights	Try: John Cooney 7' c Con: John Cooney (1/1) 8'; Pen: John Cooney (2/2) 2', 64'	Attendance: 19,004; Referee: Matthew Carley (RFU)
Ulster lineup: 1. Jack McGrath, 2. Rob Herring, 3. Marty Moore, 4. Alan O'Connor, 5. Iain Henderson, 6. Sean Reidy, 7. Jordi Murphy, 8. Marcell Coetzee, 9. John Cooney, 10. Billy Burns, 11. Jacob Stockdale, 12. Stuart McCloskey, 13. Luke Marshall, 14. Robert Baloucoune, 15. Will Addison.; Replacements: 16. Adam McBurney, 17. Eric O'Sullivan (for McGrath, 60'), 18. Tom O'Toole (for Moore, 49'), 19. Kieran Treadwell (for O'Connor, 69'), 20. Matty Rea (for Murphy, 69'), 21. David Shanahan (for Cooney, 69'), 22. Bill Johnston (for Burns, 69'), 23. Matt Faddes (for Addison, 50').				Attendance: 19,004; Referee: Matthew Carley (RFU)

18 January 2020	Ulster (Ireland)	22–15	(England) Bath (1 BP)	Ravenhill Stadium, Belfast
15:15	Try: Marcell Coetzee 5' c Robert Baloucoune 41' c Will Addison 47' m Con: John Cooney (2/3) 6', 42'; Pen: Billy Burns (1/1) 73'	Report; Highlights; Full game	Try: Ruaridh McConnochie 18' c Ross Batty 65' m Con: Freddie Burns (1/2) 19'; Pen: Freddie Burns (1/1) 46'; Cards: Ellis (yellow card) 23'; Batty (red card) 73'	Attendance: 17,682; Referee: Alexandre Ruiz (FFR)
Ulster lineup: 1. Jack McGrath, 2. Rob Herring, 3. Tom O'Toole, 4. Alan O'Connor, 5. Iain Henderson, 6. Sean Reidy, 7. Jordi Murphy, 8. Marcell Coetzee, 9. John Cooney, 10. Billy Burns, 11. Jacob Stockdale, 12. Stuart McCloskey, 3. Luke Marshall, 14. Robert Baloucoune, 15. Will Addison.; Replacements: 16. Adam McBurney, 17. Eric O'Sullivan (for McGrath, 55'), 18. Ross Kane (for O'Toole, 26'), 19. Kieran Treadwell (for O'Connor, 60'), 20. Nick Timoney (for Murphy, 5'), 21. David Shanahan (for Cooney, 72'), 22. Bill Johnston, 23. Craig Gilroy (for Addison, 13', 52').				Attendance: 17,682; Referee: Alexandre Ruiz (FFR)

=== Quarter-final ===
20 September 2020	Toulouse (France) (3)	36–8	(6) (Ireland) Ulster	Stade Ernest-Wallon, Toulouse
13:30	Try: Cheslin Kolbe (2) 2' m, 39' c Antoine Dupont 50' c Thomas Ramos 66' c Pita Ahki 61' c Con: Thomas Ramos (4/5) 40'+1, 52', 63', 69'; Pen: Thomas Ramos (1/2) 14'	Report; Highlights; Extended highlights	Try: John Cooney 72' m Pen: John Cooney (1/1) 26'	Referee: Wayne Barnes (RFU)
Ulster lineup: 1. Jack McGrath, 2. Rob Herring, 3. Marty Moore, 4. Alan O'Connor, 5. Iain Henderson, 6. Sean Reidy, 7. Jordi Murphy, 8. Nick Timoney, 9. John Cooney, 10. Billy Burns, 11. Jacob Stockdale, 12. Stuart McCloskey, 13. Luke Marshall, 14. Rob Lyttle, 15. Michael Lowry.; Replacements: 16. John Andrew (for Herring, 62'), 17. Eric O'Sullivan (for McGrath, 46'), 18. Ross Kane (for O'Toole, 62'), 19. Sam Carter (for O'Connor, 46'), 20. Kieran Treadwell (for Henderson, 55'), 21. Alby Mathewson (for McCloskey, 51'), 22. Matt Faddes (for Burns, 15'), 23. Matty Rea (for Timoney, 42').				Referee: Wayne Barnes (RFU)

== Pro14 ==
2019–20 Pro14 table
Conference A
	Team	P	W	D	L	PF	PA	PD	TF	TA	TBP	LBP	PTS
1	(Ireland) Leinster (CH)	15	15	0	0	531	216	+315	74	28	9	0	69
2	(Ireland) Ulster (RU)	15	8	1	6	385	306	+79	50	40	7	3	44 (Note: Ulster deducted 1 point for administration error regarding Ian Madigan.)
3	(Scotland) Glasgow Warriors	15	8	0	7	364	329	+35	53	42	5	1	38
4	(South Africa) Cheetahs	13	6	0	7	342	280	+62	48	32	5	2	32
5	(Wales) Dragons	15	5	1	9	283	415	–132	32	49	1	1	24
6	(Italy) Zebre	15	3	1	11	230	399	–169	29	56	4	3	21
7	(Wales) Ospreys	15	2	2	11	205	375	–170	21	45	1	4	17
Conference B
	Team	P	W	D	L	PF	PA	PD	TF	TA	TBP	LBP	PTS
1	(Scotland) Edinburgh (SF)	15	11	0	4	391	225	+166	47	27	5	2	51
2	(Ireland) Munster (SF)	15	10	0	5	426	255	+171	53	26	8	3	51
3	(Wales) Scarlets	15	10	0	5	354	274	+80	46	34	5	2	47
4	(Ireland) Connacht	15	8	0	7	302	360	–58	41	48	7	1	40
5	(Italy) Benetton	15	6	1	8	309	350	–41	35	42	5	5	36
6	(Wales) Cardiff Blues	15	7	0	8	283	327	–44	30	38	3	2	33
7	(South Africa) Southern Kings	13	1	0	12	204	498	–294	23	75	0	3	7
If teams are level at any stage, tiebreakers are applied in the following order -: 1. number of matches won 2. the difference between points for and points against 3. the number of tries scored 4. the most points scored 5. the difference between tries for and tries against 6. the fewest red cards received 7. the fewest yellow cards received
Green background indicates teams that compete in the Pro14 play-offs, and also earn a place in the 2020–21 European Champions Cup Blue background indicates teams outside the play-off places that earn a place in the 2020–21 European Champions Cup; Red background indicates teams ineligible for European cup tournaments Plain background indicates teams that earn a place in the 2020–21 European Rugby Challenge Cup. (CH) Champions. (RU) Runners-up. (SF) Losing semi-finalists. (Q) Qualified for Pro14 play-off semi-finals. (e) Cannot reach play-offs.

27 September 2019	(1 BP) Ulster (Ireland)	38–14	(Wales) Ospreys	Ravenhill Stadium, Belfast
19:35	Try: Gilroy 13' c, 50' c Jones 30' c Faddes 39' c Penalty Try 71'; Con: Cooney (4/4) 14', 31' 40+1, 51'; Pen: Cooney (1/1) 46'	Report; Match centre Highlights	Try: Evans 7' m Pen: Price (3/3) 4', 22', 37'; Cards: Morgan (yellow card) 30'	Attendance: 12,408; Referee: Marius Mitrea
Ulster lineup: 1. Jack McGrath, 2. Rob Herring, 3. Tom O'Toole, 4. Kieran Treadwell, 5. Sam Carter, 6. Matty Rea, 7. Sean Reidy, 8. Greg Jones, 9. John Cooney, 10. Billy Burns, 11. Rob Lyttle, 12. James Hume, 13. Luke Marshall, 14. Craig Gilroy, 15. Matt Faddes.; Replacements: 16. John Andrew (for Herring 70'), 17. Eric O'Sullivan (for McGrath 59'), 18. Ross Kane (for O'Toole 59'), 19. Alan O'Connor (for Carter 60'), 20. Clive Ross (for Matty Rea 70'), 21. David Shanahan (for Cooney 70'), 22. Michael Lowry (for Burns 52'), 23. Louis Ludik (for Marshall 72').				Attendance: 12,408; Referee: Marius Mitrea

5 October 2019	(1 BP) Cheetahs (South Africa)	63–26	(Ireland) Ulster (1 BP)	Free State Stadium, Bloemfontein
17:15	Try: Volmink (3) 8' c 21' c 42' c Smith (2) 27' c 45' c Dweba 36' c Fouché 49' c Venter 68' c Con: Pienaar (6) 9' 22' 29' 38' 43' 46'; Schoeman 50' 69'; Cards: Dweba (yellow card) 63'	Report; Match centre Highlights	Try: Carter 25' c Hume 58' c Shanahan 63'; Gilroy 79' c Con: Cooney 26'; Johnston (2) 58' 80'	Attendance: 4,582; Referee: Ian Davies
Ulster lineup: 1. Eric O'Sullivan, 2. Rob Herring, 3. Tom O'Toole, 4. Kieran Treadwell, 5. Sam Carter, 6. Matty Rea, 7. Sean Reidy, 8. Greg Jones, 9. John Cooney, 10. Bill Johnston, 11. Rob Lyttle, 12. James Hume, 13. Luke Marshall, 14. Craig Gilroy, 15. Matt Faddes.; Replacements: 16. John Andrew (for Herring 52'), 17. Kyle McCall (for O'Sullivan 46', 18. Ross Kane (for O'Toole 46'), 19. Alan O'Connor (for Carter 46'), 20. Clive Ross (for Reidy 50'), 21. David Shanahan (for Cooney 46'), 22. Michael Lowry (for Faddes 46'), 23. Louis Ludik (for Hume 65').				Attendance: 4,582; Referee: Ian Davies

12 October 2019	Southern Kings (South Africa)	17–42	(Ireland) Ulster (1 BP)	Nelson Mandela Bay Stadium, Gqeberha
15:00	Try: Kruger 37' c Fortuin 68' c Con: Catrakilis 37'; Jackson 68'; Pen: Catrakilis 7'	Report; Match centre Highlights	Try: Cooney (2) 1' c 31' c L. Marshall 13' c Herring 16' c Faddes 29' c Reidy 58' c Con: Cooney (6) 2' 14' 17' 30' 32' 59'; Cards: McBurney (yellow card) 67'; Jones (yellow card) 70'	Attendance: 2,807; Referee: Craig Evans
Ulster lineup: 1. Eric O'Sullivan, 2. Rob Herring, 3. Tom O'Toole, 4. Alan O'Connor, 5. Sam Carter, 6. Matty Rea, 7. Sean Reidy, 8. Marcell Coetzee, 9. John Cooney, 10. Billy Burns, 11. Louis Ludik, 12. Stuart McCloskey, 13. Luke Marshall, 14. Craig Gilroy, 15. Matt Faddes.; Replacements: 16. Adam McBurney (for Herring 54'), 17. Kyle McCall (for O'Sullivan 55'), 18. Ross Kane (for O'Toole 64'), 19. Kieran Treadwell (for Carter 51'), 20. Greg Jones (for Coetzee 66'), 21. David Shanahan (for Cooney 60'), 22. Angus Curtis (for Burns 70'), 23. James Hume (for McCloskey 45').				Attendance: 2,807; Referee: Craig Evans

25 October 2019	Ulster (Ireland)	23–14	(Wales) Cardiff Blues	Ravenhill Stadium, Belfast
19:35	Try: L. Marshall 2' c Burns 19'c Con: Cooney (2) 3' 20'; Pen: Cooney (3) 8' 45' 62'; Cards: L. Marshall (yellow card) 39'	Report; Match centre Highlights	Try: Summerhill 42' c Boyde 56' c Con: Evans (2) 43' 57'	Attendance: 12,250; Referee: Mike Adamson
Ulster lineup: 1. Jack McGrath, 2. John Andrew, 3. Tom O'Toole, 4. Alan O'Connor, 5. Kieran Treadwell, 6. Matty Rea, 7. Sean Reidy, 8. Marcell Coetzee, 9. John Cooney, 10. Billy Burns, 11. Louis Ludik, 12. James Hume, 13. Luke Marshall, 14. Craig Gilroy, 15. Will Addison.; Replacements: 16. Adam McBurney (for Andrew 58'), 17. Eric O'Sullivan (for McGrath 49'), 18. Ross Kane (for O'Toole 65'), 19. Sam Carter (for O'Connor 49'), 20. Nick Timoney (for Reidy 58'), 21. David Shanahan, 22. Bill Johnston, 23. Matt Faddes (for Hume 2').				Attendance: 12,250; Referee: Mike Adamson

1 November 2019	Ulster (Ireland)	22–7	(Italy) Zebre	Ravenhill Stadium, Belfast
19:35	Try: Shanahan 20' c Penalty try 51'; Lyttle 70'; Con: Johnston 21'; Pen: Johnston 32'	Report; Match centre Highlights	Try: Bellina 1' c Con: Canna 2'; Cards: Nagle (yellow card) 51'; Licata (yellow card) 68'	Attendance: 10,975; Referee: Sam Grove-White
Ulster lineup: 1. Jack McGrath, 2. Rob Herring, 3. Tom O'Toole, 4. Alan O'Connor, 5. Kieran Treadwell, 6. Matty Rea, 7. Nick Timoney, 8. Marcell Coetzee, 9. David Shanahan, 10. Bill Johnston, 11. Rob Lyttle, 12. Luke Marshall, 13. Matt Faddes, 14. Louis Ludik, 15. Will Addison.; Replacements: 16. Adam McBurney (for Herring 71'), 17. Kyle McCall (for McGrath 71'), 18. Ross Kane (for O'Toole 71'), 19. Sam Carter (for O'Connor 54'), 20. Sean Reidy (for Timoney 51'), 21. John Cooney (for Shanahan 71'), 22. Angus Curtis (for Ludik 51'), 23. Craig Gilroy (for Addison 16').				Attendance: 10,975; Referee: Sam Grove-White

9 November 2019	Munster (Ireland)	22–16	(Ireland) Ulster (1 BP)	Thomond Park, Limerick
17:15	Try: Stander 14' c R. Scannell 35'; Conway 64' c Con: Hanrahan 14'; Bleyendaal 66'; Pen: Hanrahan 25'	Report; Match centre Highlights	Try: Herring 49' c Con: Cooney 51'; Pen: Cooney (3) 3' 19' 57'	Attendance: 14,436; Referee: Frank Murphy
Ulster lineup: 1. Jack McGrath, 2. Rob Herring, 3. Marty Moore, 4. Alan O'Connor, 5. Sam Carter, 6. Sean Reidy, 7. Jordi Murphy, 8. Nick Timoney, 9. John Cooney, 10. Angus Curtis, 11. Jacob Stockdale, 12. Stuart McCloskey, 13. Luke Marshall, 14. Rob Lyttle, 15. Matt Faddes.; Replacements: 16. Adam McBurney (for Herring 53'), 17. Eric O'Sullivan (for McGrath 55'), 18. Tom O'Toole (for Moore 53'), 19. Kieran Treadwell (for O'Connor 55'), 20. Matty Rea (for Murphy 66'), 21. David Shanahan (for Cooney 78'), 22. Bill Johnston (for Curtis 78'), 23. Robert Baloucoune (for Lyttle 70').				Attendance: 14,436; Referee: Frank Murphy

29 November 2019	(1 BP) Ulster (Ireland)	29–5	(Wales) Scarlets	Ravenhill Stadium, Belfast
19:35	Try: Faddes (2) 4' 78'; Cooney 8' c Matty Rea 16' c Baloucoune 27'; Con: John Cooney (2) 8' 17'; Cards: Gilroy (yellow card) 72'	Report; Match centre Highlights	Try: Morgan 74'; Cards: Cassiem (yellow card) 28'	Attendance: 12,319; Referee: Sam Grove-White
Ulster lineup: 1. Eric O'Sullivan, 2. Rob Herring, 3. Marty Moore, 4. Alan O'Connor, 5. Kieran Treadwell, 6. Matty Rea, 7. Sean Reidy, 8. Marcell Coetzee, 9. John Cooney, 10. Bill Johnston, 11. Craig Gilroy, 12. Stuart McCloskey, 13. Matt Faddess, 14. Robert Baloucoune, 15. Louis Ludik.; Replacements: 16. Adam McBurney (for Herring 50'), 17. Andrew Warwick (for O'Sullivan 65'), 18. Tom O'Toole (for Moore 58'), 19. David O'Connor (for Rea 71'), 20. Nick Timoney (for Coetzee 50'), 21. David Shanahan (for Cooney 50'), 22. Angus Curtis (for Johnston 71'), 23. Angus Kernohan (for Ludik 65').				Attendance: 12,319; Referee: Sam Grove-White

20 December 2019	(1 BP) Leinster (Ireland)	54–42	(Ireland) Ulster (1 BP)	RDS Arena, Dublin
19:35	Try: Deegan (2) 2' c 62' c Penny (2) 15' c 22' c Henshaw 27' c McFadden 39'; R. Kearney 44' c Kelleher 48' c Con: H. Byrne (7) 3' 16' 23' 28' 45' 49' 62'; Cards: Murphy (yellow card) 79'	Report; Match centre Highlights	Try: Kernohan 8' c Faddes 35' c Gilroy 57' c Jones (2) 64' v 72' c Stewart 80+2'; Con: Johnston (6) 10' 37' 58' 65' 73' 80+2'; Cards: Faddes (yellow card) 19'	Attendance: 16,375; Referee: George Clancy
Ulster lineup: 1. Andrew Warwick, 2. Adam McBurney, 3. Tom O'Toole, 4. David O'Connor, 5. Alan O'Connor, 6. Matty Rea, 7. Nick Timoney, 8. Greg Jones, 9. David Shanahan, 10. Bill Johnston, 11. Angus Kernohan, 12. Angus Curtis, 13. Matt Faddes, 14. Craig Gilroy, 15. Rob Lyttle.; Replacements: 16. John Andrew (for McBurney 55'), 17. Kyle McCall (for Warwick 55'), 18. Ross Kane (for O'Toole 55'), 19. Jack Regan (for A. O'Connor 69'), 20. Azur Allison (for Curtis 51'), 21. Jonny Stewart (for Shanahan 71'), 22. Stewart Moore (for Faddes 49'), 23. Ethan McIlroy (for Lyttle 23').				Attendance: 16,375; Referee: George Clancy

27 December 2019	(1 BP) Ulster (Ireland)	35–3	(Ireland) Connacht	Ravenhill Stadium, Dublin
19:35	Try: A. O'Connor 17' c Burns 22' c Baloucoune 43' c Herring 49' c Timoney 76' c Con: Cooney (4) 18' 23' 44' 50'; Johnston 77'; Cards: Herring (yellow card) 39'	Report; Match centre Highlights	Pen: Fitzgerald; Cards: Delahunt (yellow card) 64'	Attendance: 17,483; Referee: Sean Gallagher
Ulster lineup: 1. Jack McGrath, 2. Rob Herring, 3. Marty Moore, 4. Alan O'Connor, 5. Kieran Treadwell, 6. Matty Rea, 7. Sean Reidy, 8. Marcell Coetzee, 9. John Cooney, 10. Billy Burns, 11. Louis Ludik, 12. Stuart McCloskey, 13. Luke Marshall, 14. Robert Baloucoune, 15. Will Addison.; Replacements: 16. Adam McBurney (for Gilroy 39-46', for Herring 64'), 17. Kyle McCall (for McGrath 51'), 18. Tom O'Toole (for Moore 51'), 19. David O'Connor (for Treadwell 59'), 20. Nick Timoney (for Coetzee 23'), 21. David Shanahan (for Cooney 69'), 22. Bill Johnston (for Burns 60'), 23. Craig Gilroy (for Ludik 27').				Attendance: 17,483; Referee: Sean Gallagher

3 January 2020	(1 BP) Ulster (Ireland)	38–17	(Ireland) Munster	Ravenhill Stadium, Belfast
19:35	Try: Cooney 17. c Baloucoune 34' c Matty Rea 42' c McCloskey 57' c Stockdale 61' c Con: Cooney (5) 18' 35' 43' 58' 62'; Pen: Cooney 14'; Cards: McCall (yellow card) 79'	Report; Match centre Highlights	Try: Daly 9' c N. Scannell 65' c Con: Carbery (2) 10' 65'; Pen: Carbery 39'; Cards: Cloete (yellow card) 75'	Attendance: 17,461; Referee: Daniel Jones
Ulster lineup: 1. Jack McGrath, 2. Rob Herring, 3. Marty Moore, 4. Alan O'Connor, 5. Iain Henderson, 6. Matty Rea, 7. Sean Reidy, 8. Nick Timoney, 9. John Cooney, 10. Billy Burns, 11. Jacob Stockdale, 12. Stuart McCloskey, 13. Luke Marshall, 14. Robert Baloucoune, 15. Will Addison.; Replacements: 16. John Andrew (for Herring 72'), 17. Kyle McCall (gor McGrath 62'), 18. Tom O'Toole (for Moore 58'), 19. David O'Connor (for A. O'Connor 66'), 20. Greg Jones (for Reidy 70'), 21. David Shanahan (for Burns 62'), 22. Angus Kernohan (for Cooney 73'), 23. Craig Gilroy (for Marshall 62').				Attendance: 17,461; Referee: Daniel Jones

15 February 2020	Ospreys (Wales)	26–24	(Ireland) Ulster (1 BP)	Liberty Stadium, Swansea
17:15	Try: Watkin 15' c Otten (2) 24' 47'; Con: Price 16'; Pen: Price (3) 4' 28' 75'	Report; Match centre Highlights	Try: Baloucoune 9' c Faddes 59' c McCloskey 67' c Con: Burns 10'; Johnston (2) 60' 69'; Pen: Burns 35'	Attendance: 5,868; Referee: Marius Mitrea
Lineup: 1. Eric O'Sullivan, 2. Adam McBurney, 3. Marty Moore, 4. Alan O'Connor, 5. Kieran Treadwell, 6. Matty Rea, 7. Sean Reidy, 8. Marcell Coetzee, 9. David Shanahan, 10. Billy Burns, 11. Louis Ludik, 12. Stuart McCloskey, 13. Luke Marshall, 14. Robert Baloucoune, 15. Matt Faddes.; Replacements: 16. John Andrew (for McBurney 50'), 17. Jack McGrath (for O'Sullivan 40'), 18. Tom O'Toole (for Moore 40'), 19. David O'Connor (for Treadwell 50'), 20. Jordi Murphy (for Rea 50'), 21. Jonny Stewart, 22. Bill Johnston (for Burns 57'), 23. Craig Gilroy (for Faddes 60').				Attendance: 5,868; Referee: Marius Mitrea

22 February 2020	Ulster (Ireland)	20–10	(South Africa) Cheetahs	Ravenhill Stadium, Belfast
19:35	Try: O'Toole 7' c Baloucoune 45' c Con: Johnston (2) 8' 47'; Pen: Johnston (2) 35' 59'	Report; Match centre Highlights; Full game	Try: Blommetjies 65' c Con: Pienaar 67'; Pen: Pienaar 38'	Attendance: 13,829; Referee: Mike Adamson
Ulster lineup: 1. Eric O'Sullivan, 2. Adam McBurney, 3. Marty Moore, 4. Alan O'Connor, 5. Kieran Treadwell, 6. Nick Timoney, 7. Jordi Murphy, 8. Marcell Coetzee, 9. David Shanahan, 10. Bill Johnston, 11. Louis Ludik, 12. James Hume, 13. Luke Marshall, 14. Robert Baloucoune, 15. Michael Lowry.; Replacements: 16. John Andrew (for McBurney 65'), 17. Andrew Warwick, 18. Tom O'Toole (For M. Moore 5'), 19. David O'Connor (for Treadwell 58'), 20. Sean Reidy (for Murphy 58'), 21. Jonny Stewart (for Shanahan 61'), 22. Stewart Moore (for Hume 67'), 23. Craig Gilroy (for Lowry 61').				Attendance: 13,829; Referee: Mike Adamson

29 February 2020	Benetton (Italy)	0-0	(Ireland) Ulster	Stadio Comunale di Monigo, Treviso
15:00		Postponed due to coronavirus fears. Awarded as a 0–0 draw.

23 August 2020	(1 BP) Connacht (Ireland)	26–20	(Ireland) Ulster (1 BP)	Aviva Stadium, Dublin
16:30	Try: Porch 11' c Marmion 22' c Aki 54' c Aungier 78'; Con: Carty (3) 11' 23' 55'	Report; Match centre Highlights	Try: Stockdale 48' c Timoney 61' c Con: Burns 49'; Madigan 62'; Pen: Cooney (2) 5' 20'	Referee: Frank Murphy
Ulster lineup: 1. Jack McGrath, 2. Adam McBurney, 3. Marty Moore, 4. Alan O'Connor, 5. Kieran Treadwell, 6. Nick Timoney, 7. Jordi Murphy, 8. Marcell Coetzee, 9. John Cooney, 10. Billy Burns, 11. Louis Ludik, 12. Stuart McCloskey, 13. James Hume, 14. Craig Gilroy, 15. Jacob Stockdale.; Replacements: 16. John Andrew (for McBurney 56'), 17. Eric O'Sullivan (for McGrath 40'), 18. Tom O'Toole (for Moore 40'), 19. Sam Carter (for O'Connor 31'), 20. Matty Rea (for Coetzee 46'), 21. Alby Mathewson (for Cooney 40'), 22. Ian Madigan (for Burns 52'), 23. Michael Lowry (for Hume 72').				Referee: Frank Murphy

29 August 2020	Ulster (Ireland)	10–28	(Ireland) Leinster	Aviva Stadium, Dublin
19:35	Try: Herring 53' c Con: Cooney 54'; Pen: Cooney 67'	Report; Match report Highlights	Try: E. Byrne 2' c Penny 72'; H. Byrne 77'; Con: R. Byrne 4'; H. Byrne 79'; Pen: R. Byrne (3) 14' 20' 44'	Referee: George Clancy
Ulster lineup: 1. Eric O'Sullivan, 2. Rob Herring, 3. Tom O'Toole, 4. Sam Carter, 5. Kieran Treadwell, 6. Matty Rea, 7. Jordi Murphy, 8. Marcell Coetzee, 9. John Cooney, 10. Ian Madigan, 11. Rob Lyttle, 12. Stuart McCloskey, 13. James Hume, 14. Matt Faddes, 15. Jacob Stockdale.; Replacements: 16. John Andrew (for Herring 62'), 17. Kyle McCall (for O'Sullivan 70'), 18. Marty Moore (for O'Toole 54'), 19. David O'Connor (for Treadwell 54'), 20. Nick Timoney (for Murphy 62'), 21. David Shanahan (for McCloskey 73'), 22. Bill Johnston (for Madigan 62'), 23. Louis Ludik (for Stockdale 54').				Referee: George Clancy

=== Semi-final ===
5 September 2020	Edinburgh (Scotland)	19–22	(Ireland) Ulster	Murrayfield Stadium, Edinburgh
19:35	Try: McInally 14'; Graham 46'; Dean 57'; Con: Van der Walt (2/3) 47', 59'	Report; Match centre Highlights; Extended highlights	Try: Lyttle 54'; Herring 62'; Andrew 75'; Con: Burns (1/2) 55'; Madigan (1/1) 76'; Pen: Madigan (1/1) 80'	Attendance: 0 Referee: Frank Murphy (Ireland)
Ulster lineup: 1. Eric O'Sullivan, 2. Rob Herring, 3. Tom O'Toole, 4. Alan O'Connor, 5. Sam Carter, 6. Matty Rea, 7. Jordi Murphy, 8. Marcell Coetzee, 9. John Cooney, 10. Billy Burns, 11. Rob Lyttle, 12. Stuart McCloskey, 13. James Hume, 14. Louis Ludik, 15. Jacob Stockdale.; Replacements: 16. John Andrew (for Herring 69'), 17. Jack McGrath (for O'Sullivan 51'), 18. Marty Moore (for O'Toole 51'), 19. Kieran Treadwell (for Carter 48'), 20. Sean Reidy (for Murphy 40'), 21. Alby Mathewson (for Cooney 40'), 22. Ian Madigan (for Burns 69'), 23. Michael Lowry (for Ludik 40').				Attendance: 0 Referee: Frank Murphy (Ireland)

=== Final ===
12 September 2020	Leinster (Ireland)	27–5	(Ireland) Ulster	Aviva Stadium, Dublin
19:35	Try: Lowe 12' c Henshaw 45' c Doris 71' c Con: R. Byrne (2/2) 14', 47'; Sexton (1/1) 72'; Pen: R. Byrne (2/2) 26', 44'	Report; Match centre Highlights; Extended highlights	Try: Hume 3' m	Attendance: 0 Referee: Andrew Brace (Ireland)
Ulster lineup: 1. Eric O'Sullivan, 2. Rob Herring, 3. Tom O'Toole, 4. Alan O'Connor, 5. Iain Henderson, 6. Matty Rea, 7. Sean Reidy, 8. Marcell Coetzee, 9. Alby Mathewson, 10. Billy Burns, 11. Jacob Stockdale, 12. Stuart McCloskey, 13. James Hume, 14. Rob Lyttle, 15. Michael Lowry.; Replacements: 16. John Andrew (for Herring 20-34', 72'), 17. Jack McGrath (for O'Sullivan 47'), 18. Marty Moore (for O'Toole 55'), 19. Sam Carter (for Henderson 47'), 20. Jordi Murphy (for Rea 55'), 21. John Cooney (for Mathewson 47'), 22. Ian Madigan (for Burns 54'), 23. Nick Timoney (for Coetzee 47').				Attendance: 0 Referee: Andrew Brace (Ireland)

== Home attendance ==
Domestic League					European Cup					Total	
League	Fixtures	Average Attendance	Highest	Lowest	League	Fixtures	Average Attendance	Highest	Lowest	Total Attendance	Average Attendance
2019–20 Pro14	7‡	13,818	17,483	10,975	2019–20 European Rugby Champions Cup	3	17,024	17,923	15,466	147,796	14,780
‡Match figures include fixtures in which COVID-19 restrictions limited attendance, but exclude fixtures in which no spectators were allowed due to the COVID-19 pandemic.

== Ulster Women ==
The squad for the 2019 Interprovincial Series was announced in August.

=== Staff ===
Position	Name	Nationality
Head coach	Neill Alcorn	
Performance coach	Derek Suffern	
Assistant coach	John Creighton	
Assistant coach	Peter Weir	
Strength & conditioning	Paul Heasley	
Physio	Cat Sloan	
Manager	Neal Johnston	

=== Squad ===
Ulster Senior Women's Squad
**Props**: (Ireland) Megan Brodie (Harlequins); (Ireland) Shannon Heapes (Cooke); (Ireland) Emma Kearney (Cooke); (Ireland) Aishling O’Connell (Cooke); (Ireland) Lauren Maginnes (Malone); (Ireland) **Ilse van Staden** (Cooke); **Hookers**: (Ireland) Neve Jones (Malone); (Ireland) **Stacey-Lea Kennedy** (City of Derry); (Ireland) Lesley Megarity (Cooke); **Locks**: (Ireland) Hannah Beattie (Malone); (Ireland) Keelin Brady (Barnhall); (Ireland) Rebecca Lawlor (Malone); (Ireland) Chloe McIlwaine (Malone)	**Back row**: (Ireland) Shannon Buller (Queens); (Ireland) Beth Cregan (Cooke); (Ireland) Katie Hetherington (Cooke); **Scrum-halves**: (Ireland) **Kathryn Dane** (Old Belvedere); (Ireland) Jemma Jackson (Old Belvedere); (Ireland) Jenna McKeown (Malone); **Fly-halves**: (Ireland) Vicky Irwin (Cooke); (Ireland) Lisa Mullen (Virginia)	**Centres**: (Ireland) Dolores Hughes (Cooke); (Ireland) Maeve Liston (Cooke); (Ireland) Peita McAlister (Malone); (Ireland) Kelly McCormill (Cooke); **Wings**: (Ireland) Emma Jordan (Malone); (Ireland) Diane Ramsay (Queens); (Ireland) Fiona Tuite (Old Belvedere); **Fullbacks**: (Ireland) Holly Brannigan (Malone); (Ireland) Ella Durkan (Malone)
(c) denotes the team captain, **Bold** denotes internationally capped players.

=== 2019-20 Women's Interprovincial Series ===
	Team	P	W	D	L	PF	PA	BP	Pts
1	Leinster	5	5	0	0	162	39	0	20
2	Munster	5	3	0	2	134	70	2	14
3	Connacht	5	2	0	3	64	122	0	8
4	Ulster	5	0	0	5	51	180	1	1

17 August 2019	**Munster**	**38-12**	**Ulster**	Musgrave Park, Cork

24 August 2019	**Ulster**	**5-24**	**Leinster**	Palace Grounds, Armagh

31 August 2019	**Ulster**	**19-20**	**Connacht**	Upper Malone, Belfast

14 September 2019	**Leinster**	**59-3**	**Ulster**	Templeville Road, Dublin

21 September 2019	**Munster**	**39-12**	**Ulster**	Donnybrook Stadium, Dublin

== Ulster Rugby Awards ==
The Ulster Rugby Awards ceremony was held on 29 September 2020. Winners were:

- Player of the Year: John Cooney (nominees: Marcell Coetzee, Alan O'Connor, Sean Reidy)
- Personality of the Year: Marcell Coetzee
- Supporters' Club Player of the Year: Marcell Coetzee (nominees: John Cooney, Stuart McCloskey)
- Rugby Writers' Player of the Year: Marcell Coetzee (nominees: John Cooney, Stuart McCloskey)
- Young Player of the Year: Tom O'Toole (nominees: Robert Baloucoune, James Hume, Michael Lowry)
- Ulster A Player of the Year: Ethan McIlroy (nominees: Ross Adair, Hayden Hyde)
- Academy Player of the Year: David McCann (nominees: Ethan McIlroy, Lewis Finlay)
- Women's Player of the Year - Kathryn Dane (nominees: Vicky Irwin, Neve Jones)
- Referee of the Year: Chris Busby
- Dorrington B. Faulkner (Services to Rugby) Award: Ross Workman, Omagh Academicals RFC
- Youth Player of the Year: Jack Milton, Ballyclare RFC
- U18 Girls' Player of the Year: Ava Fannin, RFC Virginia
- Girls Schools' Player of the Year: Lucy Thompson, Enniskillen Royal Grammar School
- Boys Schools' Player of the Year: Nathan Doak, Wallace High School
- Club Player of the Year: Shea O'Brien, City of Armagh RFC
