= 2018–19 Ulster Rugby season =

Ulster Rugby
- 2018–19 season
- Head Coach: Dan McFarland
- Operations Director: Bryn Cunningham
- Captain: Rory Best
- Pro14: Semi-final
- European Rugby Champions Cup: Quarter-final
- Top try scorer: League: Rob Herring (8); All: Rob Herring (8)
- Top points scorer: League: John Cooney (100); All: John Cooney (142)
Home colours	Away colours	Third colours

The 2018–19 season was Ulster's 25th season since the advent of professionalism in rugby union, and Dan McFarland's first season as head coach. Rory Best was captain.

New signings included centre/fullback Will Addison from Sale Sharks, out-half Billy Burns from Gloucester, prop Marty Moore from Wasps, and flanker Jordi Murphy from Leinster. Academy players making their debuts included Eric O'Sullivan, centre James Hume, wing Robert Baloucoune and fullback Michael Lowry. They competed in the Pro14, making the semi-finals, and the European Rugby Champions Cup, making the quarter-finals. Stuart McCloskey was named Player of the Year

Will Addison made his debut for Ireland, with Jacob Stockdale, Jordi Murphy, Iain Henderson, Rory Best, John Cooney, Stuart McCloskey and Rob Herring also winning caps.

Ulster 'A' competed in the Celtic Cup, finishing third in the Ireland conference, and the Cara Cup. Ulster Women competed in the IRFU Women's Interprovincial Series, finishing fourth.

== Events ==
=== Personnel changes ===
After the resignation of Jono Gibbes, Dan McFarland was announced as Ulster's new head coach on 30 April 2018. Initially he was to serve his notice as Scotland's forwards coach and join Ulster in January 2019, with Simon Easterby to act as interim head coach until then. But in August, an agreement was reached with Scotland for McFarland to join Ulster before the new season. Jared Payne, who retired as a player at the end of last season, became the new defence coach. Banbridge head coach Dan Soper joined as skills coach. Shane Logan stepped down as Chief Executive in September 2018, with Jonny Petrie appointed as his successor.

There were significant changes to the playing squad. Aside from Jared Payne, wings Tommy Bowe and Andrew Trimble, scrum-half Paul Marshall, and loose forwards Peter Browne, Jean Deysel and Chris Henry also retired. Also departing were fullback Charles Piutau to Bristol Bears, props Callum Black to Worcester Warriors, Rodney Ah You to Newcastle Falcons and Wiehahn Herbst to the Bulls, out-half Brett Herron to Jersey Reds, and centre Callum Patterson to the Cornish Pirates. Scrum-half Aaron Cairns, flanker Robbie Diack and prop Schalk van der Merwe were released. Out-half Paddy Jackson and centre Stuart Olding, whose contracts were terminated in the fallout from their trial and acquittal for rape, signed for Perpignan and Brive respectively. Rory Best remained captain.

Ulster were in need of an experienced out-half after the end of Christian Lealiifano's loan period and Jackson's departure. In June they attempted to sign South African out-half Elton Jantjies, but were blocked by the IRFU, who insisted they needed to sign an Irish-qualified player. Leinster's Joey Carbery and Ross Byrne were talked about, but Carbery opted to sign for Munster and Byrne stayed at Leinster. On 18 July, Billy Burns, who qualified for Ireland through his Irish grandfather, was signed from Gloucester.

Other new arrivals were prop Marty Moore, signed from Wasps; flanker Jordi Murphy, from Leinster; utility back Will Addison, from Sale Sharks; wing Henry Speight, from the Brumbies; and, in a short-term loan deal, lock Ian Nagle, from Leinster. Academy players who made their debut for the senior team this season were prop Eric O'Sullivan, wings Robert Baloucoune and Angus Kernohan, centre James Hume, fullback Michael Lowry and flanker Marcus Rea. Former academy prop Tommy O'Hagan also made his senior debut.

Seven players joined the academy this season: back row forward Matthew Agnew, from Malone RFC; out-half Bruce Houston, centre Stewart Moore, and back-rower Azur Allison, from Ballymena Academy; back rower David McCann, from RBAI; outside back Iwan Hughes, from Bristol Bears; and wing Angus Kernohan, from Ballymena Academy.

=== Sponsorship ===
Ulster renewed their sponsorship deal with construction materials firm Kingspan, who would continue as Ulster's jersey sponsor until 1923. Their stadium naming deal would continue until 2024.

=== Season ===
In the Pro14, Ulster finished second in Conference B, qualifying for the playoffs and next season's Champions Cup. They defeated Connacht in the quarter-final, but lost to Glasgow Warriors in the semi-final. Ulster led the league in defence. Scrum-half John Cooney and centre Stuart McCloskey made the Pro14 Dream Team. They finished second in Pool 4 of the Champions Cup, making the quarter-finals, where they lost to Leinster. Wing Jacob Stockdale was named on the longlist for EPCR European Player of the Year.

John Cooney was leading scorer with 142 points. Hooker Rob Herring was leading try scorer with eight. Flanker Nick Timoney was leading tackler with 303, just ahead of number eight Marcell Coetzee with 301. Stuart McCloskey was Ulster's Player of the Year. Captain and hooker Rory Best and centre Darren Cave retired at the end of the season.

== Staff ==
Position	Name	Nationality
Chief executive officer	Jonny Petrie	Scotland
Operations Director	Bryn Cunningham	Ireland
Head Coach	Dan McFarland	England
Assistant Coach	Dwayne Peel	Wales
Defence Coach	Jared Payne	Ireland
Scrum Coach	Aaron Dundon	New Zealand
Skills Coach	Dan Soper	New Zealand
Strength & Conditioning Coach	Kevin Geary	Ireland

== Squad ==
=== Senior squad ===
==== Players In ====
- (England) Will Addison from (England) Sale Sharks
- (Ireland) Alan Bennie from (Ireland) Lansdowne
- (England) Billy Burns from (England) Gloucester
- (Ireland) Caleb Montgomery from (Ireland) Banbridge
- (Ireland) Marty Moore from (England) Wasps
- (Ireland) Jordi Murphy from (Ireland) Leinster
- (Ireland) Ian Nagle from (Ireland) Leinster (loan deal)
- (Australia) Henry Speight from (Australia) Brumbies (short-term deal)
- (Ireland) Alexander Thompson from (Ireland) Terenure

==== Promoted from academy ====
- (Zimbabwe) Angus Curtis
- (Ireland) Greg Jones
- (Ireland) Adam McBurney
- (Ireland) Tom O'Toole
- (Ireland) Johnny Stewart
- (Ireland) Nick Timoney

==== Players Out ====
- (Ireland) Rodney Ah You to (England) Newcastle Falcons
- (Ireland) Callum Black to (England) Worcester Warriors
- (Ireland) Tommy Bowe retired
- (England) Peter Browne retired
- (Ireland) Aaron Cairns to (Ireland) Ballynahinch
- (South Africa) Jean Deysel retired
- (Ireland) Robbie Diack released
- (England) Brett Herron to (England) Jersey Reds
- (Ireland) Chris Henry retired
- (Ireland) Paddy Jackson to (France) Perpignan
- (Ireland) Paul Marshall retired
- (Ireland) Stuart Olding to (France) Brive
- (Ireland) Callum Patterson to (England) Cornish Pirates
- (Ireland) Jared Payne retired
- (New Zealand) Charles Piutau to (England) Bristol Bears
- (Ireland) Andrew Trimble retired
- (South Africa) Schalk van der Merwe released

Ulster Rugby squad
**Props**: (Ireland) Eric O'Sullivan (26 apps, 18 starts); (Ireland) Andrew Warwick (25 apps, 11 starts); (Ireland) **Marty Moore** (20 apps, 19 starts, 10 pts); (Ireland) Ross Kane (16 apps, 6 starts); (Ireland) Tom O'Toole (18 apps, 3 starts); (South Africa) Wiehahn Herbst* (7 apps, 2 starts); (Ireland) Kyle McCall (3 apps, 1 start); (Ireland) Tommy O'Hagan (2 apps); (South Africa) Schalk van der Merwe (no apps); **Hookers**: (Ireland) **Rob Herring** (22 apps, 14 starts, 40 pts); (Ireland) **Rory Best** (c) (13 apps, 11 starts); (Ireland) Adam McBurney (10 apps, 3 starts, 5 pts); (Ireland) John Andrew (13 apps, 2 starts, 5 pts); **Locks**: (Ireland) **Kieran Treadwell** (28 apps, 22 starts, 10 pts); (Ireland) Alan O'Connor (25 apps, 18 starts, 10 pts); (Ireland) **Iain Henderson** (15 apps, 15 starts, 10 pts); (Ireland) Ian Nagle (11 apps); (Ireland) Matthew Dalton (2 apps, 1 start); (Ireland) Alex Thompson (no apps)	**Back row**: (South Africa) **Marcell Coetzee** (23 apps, 23 starts, 25 pts); (Ireland) Nick Timoney (27 apps, 20 starts, 10 pts); (Ireland) **Jordi Murphy** (18 apps, 18 starts, 15 pts); (Ireland) **Sean Reidy** (25 apps, 16 starts, 5 pts); (Ireland) Clive Ross (10 apps, 4 starts); (Ireland) Greg Jones (7 apps, 2 starts); (Ireland) Matty Rea (9 apps, 5 starts); (Ireland) Marcus Rea (1 app, 5 pts); (Ireland) **Chris Henry** (1 app); (Ireland) Caleb Montgomery (1 app); **Scrum-halves**: (Ireland) **John Cooney** (21 apps, 19 starts, 142 pts); (Ireland) David Shanahan (21 apps, 11 starts, 35 pts); (Ireland) Johnny Stewart (8 apps, 10 pts); (Ireland) Alan Bennie (no apps); **Fly-halves**: (England) Billy Burns* (24 apps, 24 starts, 49 pts); (Ireland) Johnny McPhillips (11 apps, 4 starts, 15 pts); (Zimbabwe) Angus Curtis* (4 apps, 2 starts, 5 pts)	**Centres**: (Ireland) **Stuart McCloskey** (26 apps, 25 starts, 20 pts); (Ireland) **Darren Cave** (19 apps, 13 starts, 5 pts); (Ireland) Will Addison (11 apps, 11 starts, 23 pts); (Ireland) James Hume (11 apps, 5 starts); (Ireland) **Luke Marshall** (5 apps, 4 starts, 5 pts); **Wings**: (Ireland) Robert Baloucoune (14 apps, 13 starts, 30 pts); (Australia) **Henry Speight** (12 apps, 12 starts, 15 pts); (Ireland) **Jacob Stockdale** (12 apps, 11 starts, 35 pts); (Ireland) Angus Kernohan (18 apps, 7 starts, 10 pts); (Ireland) Rob Lyttle (9 apps, 7 starts, 27 pts); (Ireland) **Craig Gilroy** (6 apps, 6 starts, 5 pts); (Ireland) David Busby (1 app, 1 start); (Ireland) Jack Owens (1 app); **Fullbacks**: (South Africa) Louis Ludik* (14 apps, 14 starts, 10 pts); (Ireland) Michael Lowry (16 apps, 12 starts, 10 pts); (Ireland) Peter Nelson (13 apps, 8 starts, 9 pts)
(c) denotes the team captain, **Bold** denotes internationally capped players. Italics denotes academy players who appeared in the senior team.^{*} denotes players qualified to play for Ireland on residency or dual nationality. Players and their allocated positions from the Ulster Rugby website.

- Internationally capped players in **bold**
- Players qualified to play for Ireland on dual nationality or residency grounds*
- Irish Provinces are currently limited to four non-Irish eligible (NIE) players and one non-Irish qualified player (NIQ or "Project Player").

=== Academy squad ===
==== Players in ====
- (Ireland) Stewart Moore from (Ireland) Ballymena Academy
- (Ireland) David McCann from (Ireland) RBAI
- (Ireland) Angus Kernohan from (Ireland) Ballymena Academy.
- (Ireland) Bruce Houston from (Ireland) Ballymena Academy
- (Ireland) Azur Allison from (Ireland) Ballymena Academy
- (Ireland) Matthew Agnew from (Ireland) Malone RFC
- (England) Iwan Hughes, from (England) Bristol Bears

==== Players out ====
- (Ireland) Peter Cooper
- (Ireland) Alexander Clarke
- (Ireland) John McCusker
- (Ireland) Rory Butler

Position	Name	Nationality
Head Coach	Kieran Campbell	Ireland
Strength & Conditioning Coach	David Drake	Ireland
Strength & Conditioning Coach	Willie Anderson	Ireland
Elite Professional Development Officer	James Topping	Ireland
Provincial Talent Coach	Michael Black	Ireland
Talent Development Officer	Jonny Gillespie	Ireland
Strength & Conditioning Coach	Amy Davis	Ireland
Strength & Conditioning Coach	Matthew Godfrey	Ireland
Performance Analyst	Simon McLeod	Ireland
Lead Nutritionist	Stephanie Ingram	Ireland

Ulster Rugby Academy squad
**Props**: (Ireland) Eric O'Sullivan **(2)**; **Hookers**: (Ireland) Zack McCall **(3)**; **Locks**: (Ireland) Matthew Dalton **(2)**; (Ireland) Jack Regan **(2)**	**Back row**: (Ireland) Matthew Agnew **(1)**; (Ireland) Azur Allison **(1)**; (Ireland) Joe Dunleavy **(2)**; (Ireland) Aaron Hall **(3)**; (Ireland) David McCann **(1)**; (Ireland) Marcus Rea (3); **Scrum-halves**: (Zimbabwe) Graham Curtis* **(2)**; **Fly-halves**: (Ireland) Bruce Houston **(1)** (1 app); (Ireland) Michael Lowry **(2)**	**Centres**: (Ireland) James Hume **(2)**; (Ireland) Stewart Moore **(1)**; **Wings**: (Ireland) Robert Baloucoune **(2)**; (Ireland) Iwan Hughes **(1)**; (Ireland) Angus Kernohan **(1)**; **Fullbacks**: None
(c) denotes the team captain, **Bold** denotes internationally capped players, number in brackets indicates players stage in the three-year academy cycle.^{*} denotes players qualified to play for Ireland on residency or dual nationality. Players and their allocated positions from the Ulster Rugby website.

== Season record ==
Competition	Played	Won	Drawn	Lost	PF	PA	PD	TF	TA
2018-19 Champions Cup	7	5	0	2	149	149	0	20	18
2018-19 Pro14	23	14	2	7	482	487	-5	63	62
Total	30	19	2	9	631	636	-5	83	80

== European Rugby Champions Cup ==
=== Pool 4 ===
Team	P	W	D	L	PF	PA	Diff	TF	TA	TB	LB	Pts
(France) Racing 92 (2)	6	5	0	1	196	121	75	26	15	5	1	26
(Ireland) Ulster (6)	6	5	0	1	131	128	3	18	16	2	0	22
(Wales) Scarlets	6	1	0	5	145	170	–25	18	23	1	2	7
(England) Leicester Tigers	6	1	0	5	115	168	–53	14	22	2	1	7

13 October 2018	Ulster (Ireland)	24–10	(England) Leicester Tigers	Ravenhill Stadium, Belfast
17:30	Try: Alan O'Connor 43' c Will Addison 58' c Jacob Stockdale 72' c Con: John Cooney (3/3) 44', 59', 73'; Pen: John Cooney (1/1) 68'	Report; Highlights; Man of the Match: John Cooney	Try: Manu Tuilagi 75' c Con: George Ford (1/1) 76'; Pen: George Ford (1/1) 14'; Cards: Ford (yellow card) 21'	Attendance: 13,152; Referee: Pascal Gaüzère (FFR)
Ulster lineup: 1. Andrew Warwick, 2. Rory Best, 3. Ross Kane, 4. Alan O'Connor, 5. Iain Henderson, 6. Marcell Coetzee, 7. Jordi Murphy, 8. Nick Timoney, 9. John Cooney, 10. Billy Burns, 11. Jacob Stockdale, 12. Stuart McCloskey, 13. Will Addison, 14. Craig Gilroy, 15. Michael Lowry.; Replacements: 16. Adam McBurney (for Best 73'), 17. Eric O'Sullivan, 18. Marty Moore (for Kane 33'), 19. Kieran Treadwell (for O'Connor 57'), 20. Sean Reidy (for Murphy 50'), 21. David Shanahan (for Burns 65'), 22. Angus Curtis (for Burns 39'-41'), 23. Angus Kernohan (for McCloskey 76').				Attendance: 13,152; Referee: Pascal Gaüzère (FFR)

20 October 2018	(1 BP) Racing 92 (France)	44–12	(Ireland) Ulster	Paris La Défense Arena
17:30	Try: Teddy Iribaren 27' c Wenceslas Lauret 31' c Juan Imhoff 44' c Teddy Thomas 68' c Simon Zebo 75' c Con: Finn Russell (4/4) 28', 32', 44', 69'; Teddy Iribaren (1/1) 76'; Pen: Finn Russell (3/3) 7', 40', 48'	Report; Highlights	Try: David Shanahan 4' c Jacob Stockdale 20' m Con: Billy Burns (1/2) 5'; Cards: Timoney (yellow card) 15'	Attendance: 13,168; Referee: Nigel Owens (WRU)
Ulster lineup: 1. Andrew Warwick, 2. Rory Best, 3. Marty Moore, 4. Iain Henderson, 5. Kieran Treadwell, 6. Marcell Coetzee, 7. Jordi Murphy, 8. Nick Timoney, 9. David Shanahan, 10. Billy Burns, 11. Jacob Stockdale, 12. Stuart McCloskey, 13. Will Addison, 14. Craig Gilroy, 15. Michael Lowry.; Replacements: 16. Adam McBurney (for Best 57'), 17. Eric O'Sullivan (for Warwick 41'), 18. Ross Kane (for Moore 52'), 19. Alan O'Connor (for Treadwell 57'), 20. Sean Reidy (for Timoney 41'),<r /> 21. Johnny Stewart (for Shanahan 73'), 22. Johnny McPhillips (for Burns 45'), 23. Angus Kernohan (for Stockdale 57').				Attendance: 13,168; Referee: Nigel Owens (WRU)

7 December 2018	(1 BP) Scarlets (Wales)	24–25	(Ireland) Ulster (1 BP)	Parc y Scarlets, Llanelli
19:45	Try: Steff Evans (2) 25' c, 60' c Dan Davis 79' c Con: Rhys Patchell (2/2) 26', 61'; Dan Jones (1/1) 79'; Pen: Rhys Patchell (1/1) 1'	Report; Highlights	Try: Jacob Stockdale 8' m Henry Speight 33' m Will Addison 49' c Marcell Coetzee 64' m Con: John Cooney (1/4) 49'; Pen: John Cooney (1/2) 5'	Attendance: 7,421; Referee: Alexandre Ruiz (FFR)
Ulster lineup: 1. Eric O'Sullivan, 2. Rory Best, 3. Marty Moore, 4. Iain Henderson, 5. Kieran Treadwell, 6. Sean Reidy, 7. Jordi Murphy, 8. Marcell Coetzee, 9. John Cooney, 10. Billy Burns, 11. Jacob Stockdale, 12. Stuart McCloskey, 13. Will Addison, 14. Henry Speight, 15. Louis Ludik.; Replacements: 16. Rob Herring (for Best 69'), 17. Kyle McCall, 18. Tom O'Toole (for Moore 69'), 19. Matty Rea, 20. Nick Timoney (for Reidy 24'), 21. David Shanahan, 22. Johnny McPhillips (for Burns 75'), 23. Darren Cave.				Attendance: 7,421; Referee: Alexandre Ruiz (FFR)

14 December 2018	(1 BP) Ulster (Ireland)	30–15	(Wales) Scarlets	Ravenhill Stadium, Belfast
19:45	Try: Iain Henderson (2) 32' c, 62' m Jacob Stockdale 50' m John Cooney 66' c Con: John Cooney (2/4) 33', 63'; Pen: John Cooney (2/2) 8', 57'	Report; Highlights	Try: Jonathan Davies 48' m Tom Prydie 77' c Con: Rhys Patchell (1/2) 49'; Pen: Rhys Patchell (1/1) 38'; Cards: Jones (yellow card) 28'	Attendance: 12,124; Referee: Luke Pearce (RFU)
Ulster lineup: 1. Eric O'Sullivan, 2. Rory Best, 3. Marty Moore, 4. Iain Henderson, 5. Kieran Treadwell, 6. Sean Reidy, 7. Jordi Murphy, 8. Marcell Coetzee, 9. John Cooney, 10. Billy Burns, 11. Jacob Stockdale, 12. Stuart McCloskey, 13. Will Addison, 14. Henry Speight, 15. Louis Ludik.; Replacements: 16. Rob Herring (for Best 67'), 17. Kyle McCall (for O'Sullivan 64'), 18. Tom O'Toole (for Moore 67'), 19. Matty Rea (for Treadwell 76'), 20. Nick Timoney (for Coetzee 67'), 21. David Shanahan, 22. Johnny McPhillips (for Burns 67'), 23. Darren Cave (for Stockdale 57').				Attendance: 12,124; Referee: Luke Pearce (RFU)

12 January 2019	Ulster (Ireland)	26–22	(France) Racing 92 (2 BP)	Ravenhill Stadium, Belfast
15:15	Try: Robert Baloucoune 7' m Jacob Stockdale (2) 13' m, 47' c Con: Billy Burns (0/2); Will Addison (1/1) 48'; Pen: Billy Burns (1/1) 1'; Will Addison (2/2) 25', 79'	Report; Highlights	Try: Virimi Vakatawa 20' m Simon Zebo 27' m Brice Dulin 58' m Oliver Klemenczak 63' c Con: Finn Russell (0/3); Teddy Iribaren (1/1) 64'	Attendance: 16,842; Referee: Andrew Jackson (RFU)
Ulster lineup: 1. Eric O'Sullivan, 2. Rory Best, 3. Marty Moore, 4. Alan O'Connor, 5. Kieran Treadwell, 6. Sean Reidy, 7. Jordi Murphy, 8. Marcell Coetzee, 9. David Shanahan, 10. Billy Burns, 11. Jacob Stockdale, 12. Stuart McCloskey, 13. Will Addison, 14. Robert Baloucoune, 15. Louis Ludik.; Replacements: 16. Rob Herring (for Best 64'), 17. Andrew Warwick (for O'Sullivan 64'), 18. Ross Kane (for Moore 64'), 19. Ian Nagle (for O'Connor 64'), 20. Nick Timoney, 21. Johnny Stewart, 22. Michael Lowry (for Burns 69'), 23. Darren Cave.				Attendance: 16,842; Referee: Andrew Jackson (RFU)

19 January 2019	(1 BP) Leicester Tigers (England)	13–14	(Ireland) Ulster	Welford Road Stadium, Leicester
15:15	Try: Matt To'omua 39' c Con: George Ford (1/1) 40+1'; Pen: George Ford (2/2) 31', 49'	Report; Highlights	Try: Marty Moore 58' c Robert Baloucoune 63' c Con: John Cooney (2/2) 59', 64'	Attendance: 20,146; Referee: Alexandre Ruiz (FFR)
Ulster lineup: 1. Eric O'Sullivan, 2. Rory Best, 3. Marty Moore, 4. Iain Henderson, 5. Kieran Treadwell, 6. Sean Reidy, 7. Jordi Murphy, 8. Marcell Coetzee, 9. David Shanahan, 10. Billy Burns, 11. Jacob Stockdale, 12. Stuart McCloskey, 13. Will Addison, 14. Robert Baloucoune, 15. Louis Ludik.; Replacements: 16. Rob Herring (for Best 64'), 17. Andrew Warwick (for O'Sullivan 49'), 18. Ross Kane (for Moore 76'), 19. Alan O'Connor (for Treadwell 64'), 20. Nick Timoney (for Coetzee 34'), 21. John Cooney (for Shanahan 49'), 22. Michael Lowry (for Burns 69'), 23. Darren Cave.				Attendance: 20,146; Referee: Alexandre Ruiz (FFR)

=== Quarter-final ===
30 March 2019	Leinster (Ireland) (3)	21–18	(6) (Ireland) Ulster	Aviva Stadium, Dublin
17:45 GMT UTC+0	Try: Ross Byrne 10' m Adam Byrne 53' c Con: Ross Byrne (1/2) 54'; Pen: Ross Byrne (3/4) 30', 34', 71'	Report; Highlights; Full match	Try: Kieran Treadwell 5' c Luke Marshall 63' m Con: John Cooney (1/2) 6'; Pen: John Cooney (2/2) 21', 38'	Attendance: 51,700; Referee: Romain Poite (FFR)
Ulster lineup: 1. Eric O'Sullivan, 2. Rory Best, 3. Marty Moore, 4. Iain Henderson, 5. Kieran Treadwelll, 6. Nick Timoney, 7. Jordi Murphy, 8. Marcell Coetzee, 9. John Cooney, 10. Billy Burns, 11. Jacob Stockdale, 12. Stuart McCloskey, 13. Darren Cave, 14. Robert Baloucoune, 15. Michael Lowry.; Replacements: 16. Rob Herring (for Best 15'), 17. Andrew Warwick (for O'Sullivan 71'), 18. Wiehahn Herbst (for Moore 54'), 19. Alan O'Connor, 20. Sean Reidy (for Coetzee 51'), 21. David Shanahan, 22. Luke Marshall (for Cave 62'), 23. Angus Kernohan.				Attendance: 51,700; Referee: Romain Poite (FFR)

== Pro14 ==
2018–19 Pro14 table
Conference A
	Team	P	W	D	L	PF	PA	PD	TF	TA	TBP	LBP	PTS
1	(Scotland) Glasgow Warriors (RU)	21	16	0	5	621	380	+241	83	48	15	2	81
2	(Ireland) Munster (SF)	21	16	0	5	612	348	+264	82	44	11	2	77
3	(Ireland) Connacht (QF)	21	12	0	9	475	394	+81	60	55	7	6	61
4	(Wales) Ospreys (PO)	21	12	0	9	445	404	+41	53	47	6	4	58
5	(Wales) Cardiff Blues	21	10	0	11	497	451	+46	60	58	7	7	54
6	(South Africa) Cheetahs	21	8	1	12	541	606	−65	80	80	9	3	46
7	(Italy) Zebre	21	3	0	18	260	640	−380	35	85	5	2	19
Conference B
	Team	P	W	D	L	PF	PA	PD	TF	TA	TBP	LBP	PTS
1	(Ireland) Leinster (CH)	21	15	1	5	672	385	+287	95	49	12	2	76
2	(Ireland) Ulster (SF)	21	13	2	6	441	424	+17	58	54	6	1	63
3	(Italy) Benetton (QF)	21	11	2	8	474	431	+43	62	55	6	3	57
4	(Wales) Scarlets	21	10	0	11	510	470	+40	68	54	7	5	52
5	(Scotland) Edinburgh	21	10	0	11	431	436	−5	52	59	6	5	51
6	(Wales) Dragons	21	5	1	15	339	599	−260	37	84	1	3	26
7	(South Africa) Southern Kings	21	2	1	18	385	735	−350	54	107	5	7	22
If teams are level at any stage, tiebreakers are applied in the following order -: 1. number of matches won 2. the difference between points for and points against 3. the number of tries scored 4. the most points scored 5. the difference between tries for and tries against 6. the fewest red cards received 7. the fewest yellow cards received
Green background indicates teams that compete in the Pro14 play-offs, and also earn a place in the 2019–20 European Champions Cup (excluding South African teams who are ineligible); Blue background indicates teams outside the play-off places that earn a place in the 2019–20 European Champions Cup; Yellow background indicates the loser of the play-off between the two fourth-ranked European teams in each conference, that earned a place in the 2019–20 European Rugby Challenge Cup. Plain background indicates teams that earn a place in the 2019–20 European Rugby Challenge Cup. (CH) Champions. (RU) Runners-up. (SF) Losing semi-finalists. (QF) Losing quarter-finalists. (PO) Champions Cup play-off winners.

1 September 2018	Ulster (Ireland)	15–13	(Wales) Scarlets (1 BP)	Ravenhill Stadium, Belfast
17:15	Pen: Cooney (5/7) 12', 16', 24', 58', 79'	Report; Match centre Highlights	Try: Patchell 6' c Con: Patchell (1/1) 7'; Pen: Jones (2/2) 54', 61'; Cards: Bulbring (yellow card); Kennedy (yellow card)	Attendance: 11,882; Referee: Marius Mitrea (FIR)
Ulster lineup: 1. Andrew Warwick, 2. John Andrew, 3. Tom O'Toole, 4. Alan O'Connor, 5. Iain Henderson, 6. Marcell Coetzee, 7. Sean Reidy, 8. Nick Timoney, 9. John Cooney, 10. Billy Burns, 11. Henry Speight, 12. Stuart McCloskey, 13. Darren Cave, 14. Craig Gilroy, 15. Will Addison.; Replacements: 16. Adam McBurney (for Andrew 54'), 17. Eric O'Sullivan (for Warwick 54'), 18. Ross Kane (for O'Toole 19'), 19. Kieran Treadwell (for Henderson 64'), 20. Chris Henry (for Coetzee 54'), 21. David Shanahan, 22. Angus Curtis, 23. Angus Kernohan (for Addison 54').				Attendance: 11,882; Referee: Marius Mitrea (FIR)

7 September 2018	Ulster (Ireland)	30–29	(Scotland) Edinburgh (1 BP)	Ravenhill Stadium, Belfast
19:35	Try: Addison 53' c Cooney 60' c Gilroy 67' c Con: Cooney (3/3) 54', 62', 69'; Pen: Cooney (3/3) 20', 26', 81'	Report; Match centre Highlights	Try: Brown 14' c Johnstone 46' c Con: Hickey (2/2) 15', 48'; Pen: Hickey (5/5) 3', 9', 22', 56', 79'	Attendance: 11,994; Referee: Stuart Berry (SARU)
Ulster lineup: 1. Andrew Warwick, 2. Rob Herring, 3. Ross Kane, 4. Kieran Treadwell, 5. Iain Henderson, 6. Marcell Coetzee, 7. Jordi Murphy, 8. Nick Timoney, 9. John Cooney, 10. Billy Burns, 11. Henry Speight, 12. Stuart McCloskey, 13. Darren Cave, 14. Craig Gilroy, 15. Will Addison.; Replacements: 16. Adam McBurney, 17. Eric O'Sullivan (for Warwick 50'), 18. Wiehahn Herbst (for Kane 50'), 19. Alan O'Connor (for Treadwell 60'), 20. Sean Reidy (for Coetzee 50'), 21. David Shanahan, 22. Angus Curtis, 23. Angus Kernohan.				Attendance: 11,994; Referee: Stuart Berry (SARU)

16 September 2018	Southern Kings (South Africa)	7–28	(Ireland) Ulster	Nelson Mandela Bay Stadium, Gqeberha
13:15	Try: Willemse 42' c Con: Banda (1/1) 43'; Cards: Burger (yellow card)	Report; Match centre Highlights	Try: Coetzee 60' c Kernohan 66' m Curtis 80' c Con: Burns (1/2) 61'; Nelson (1/1) 80'; Pen: Cooney (3/3) 4', 9', 26'; Cards: Herring (yellow card); O'Connor (yellow card)	Attendance: 5,096; Referee: Lloyd Linton (SRU)
Ulster lineup: 1. Andrew Warwick, 2. Rob Herring, 3. Tom O'Toole, 4. Alan O'Connor, 5. Kieran Treadwell, 6. Marcell Coetzee, 7. Sean Reidy, 8. Nick Timoney, 9. John Cooney, 10. Billy Burns, 11. Henry Speight, 12. Stuart McCloskey, 13. Darren Cave, 14. Craig Gilroy, 15. Peter Nelson.; Replacements: 16. Adam McBurney (for Herring 67'), 17. Eric O'Sullivan (for Warwick 48'), 18. Wiehahn Herbst (for O'Toole 45'), 19. Jean Deysel (for Treadwell 74'), 20. Matty Rea (for Timoney 56'), 21. David Shanahan (for Cooney 32'), 22. Angus Curtis (for Burns 67'), 23. Angus Kernohan (for Cave 63').				Attendance: 5,096; Referee: Lloyd Linton (SRU)

21 September 2018	(1 BP) Cheetahs (South Africa)	39–39	(Ireland) Ulster (1 BP)	Free State Stadium, Bloemfontein
19:15	Try: Olivier 1' c Small-Smith 37' c Dweba 52' m Du Toit 63' c Maxwane 74' c Con: Schoeman (3/4) 2', 38', 64'; Fouché (1/1) 74'; Pen: Schoeman (1/1) 18'; Fouché (1/1) 78'; Cards: Marais (yellow card)	Report; Match centre Highlights	Try: Shanahan (2) 3' c, 21' c Stewart 67' m Penalty try 73'; Speight 80' c Con: Burns (3/4) 4', 22', 80'; Pen: Burns (2/2) 45', 55'; Cards: O'Connor (yellow card)	Attendance: 5,063; Referee: Ben Whitehouse (WRU)
Ulster lineup: 1. Eric O'Sullivan, 2. Rob Herring (c), 3. Wiehahn Herbst, 4. Alan O'Connor, 5. Kieran Treadwell, 6. Matty Rea, 7. Sean Reidy, 8. Marcell Coetzee, 9. David Shanahan, 10. Billy Burns, 11. Angus Kernohan, 12. Stuart McCloskey, 13. Darren Cave, 14. Henry Speight, 15. Peter Nelson.; Replacements: 16. John Andrew (for Treadwell 61'), 17. Andrew Warwick (for O'Sullivan 60'), 18. Tom O'Toole (for Herbst 11'), 19. Jean Deysel (for Coetzee 50'), 20. Nick Timoney (for Reidy 24'), 21. Johnny Stewart (for Shanahan 59'), 22. Angus Curtis (for Cave 69'), 23. Johnny McPhillips.				Attendance: 5,063; Referee: Ben Whitehouse (WRU)

29 September 2018	(1 BP) Munster (Ireland)	64–7	(Ireland) Ulster	Thomond Park, Limerick
19:35	Try: Goggin (2) 5' c, 37' c O'Donnell (2) 8' c, 30' m O'Mahony 50' c Carbery 62' c Arnold 66' c Earls 70' c Wootton 77' c Con: Carbery (5/6) 5', 9', 37', 51', 63'; Keatley (3/3) 67', 71', 78'; Pen: Carbery (1/1) 16'	Report; Match centre Highlights	Try: Cave 46' c Con: Burns (1/1) 47'; Cards: Andrew (yellow card)	Attendance: 13,907; Referee: Dan Jones (WRU)
Ulster lineup: 1. Andrew Warwick, 2. Adam McBurney, 3. Ross Kane, 4. Alan O'Connor, 5. Iain Henderson, 6. Matty Rea, 7. Nick Timoney, 8. Jean Deysel, 9. John Cooney, 10. Billy Burns, 11. Angus Kernohan, 12. Angus Curtis, 13. Darren Cave, 14. Craig Gilroy, 15. Peter Nelson.; Replacements: 16. John Andrew (for McBurney 65'), 17. Eric O'Sullivan (for Warwick 64'), 18. Tom O'Toole (for Kane 40'), 19. Kieran Treadwell (for Henderson 19'), 20. Clive Ross (for Curtis 74'), 21. David Shanahan (for Cooney 33'), 22. Michael Lowry (for Nelson 40'), 23. James Hume (for Burns 65').				Attendance: 13,907; Referee: Dan Jones (WRU)

5 October 2018	(1 BP) Ulster (Ireland)	15–22	(Ireland) Connacht	Ravenhill Stadium, Belfast
19:35	Try: Stockdale 23' m Timoney 79' c Con: Cooney (1/2) 79'; Pen: Cooney (1/2) 52'; Cards: Coetzee (yellow card)	Report; Match centre Highlights	Try: O'Halloran 5' c Aki 72' m Con: Carty (1/2) 6'; Pen: Carty (1/1) 67'	Attendance: 13,109; Referee: Andrew Brace (IRFU)
Ulster lineup: 1. Andrew Warwick, 2. Rory Best, 3. Tom O'Toole, 4. Alan O'Connor, 5. Iain Henderson, 6. Matty Rea, 7. Nick Timoney, 8. Marcell Coetzee, 9. John Cooney, 10. Billy Burns, 11. Jacob Stockdale, 12. Stuart McCloskey, 13. Angus Curtis, 14. Angus Kernohan, 15. Peter Nelson.; Replacements: 16. Adam McBurney (for Best 65'), 17. Eric O'Sullivan (for Warwick 55'), 18. Ross Kane (for O'Toole 40'), 19. Kieran Treadwell (for O'Connor 66'), 20. Sean Reidy (for Coetzee 65'), 21. David Shanahan, 22. Johnny McPhillips (for Burns 65'), 23. James Hume (for Curyis 65').				Attendance: 13,109; Referee: Andrew Brace (IRFU)

26 October 2018	(1 BP) Ulster (Ireland)	36–18	(Wales) Dragons	Ravenhill Stadium, Belfast
19:55	Try: Speight 10' c Shanahan 22' c Lowry 38' c McCloskey (2) 48' m, 78' c Con: McPhillips (4/5) 11', 23', 40', 78'; Pen: McPhillips (1/1) 6'	Report; Match centre Highlights	Try: Taylor 30' c Sage 66' m Con: Tovey (1/2) 31'; Pen: Tovey (2/2) 15', 37'	Attendance: 12,559; Referee: Marius Mitrea (FIR)
Ulster lineup: 1. Eric O'Sullivan, 2. Rory Best, 3. Marty Moore, 4. Kieran Treadwell, 5. Iain Henderson, 6. Sean Reidy, 7. Jordi Murphy, 8. Marcell Coetzee, 9. David Shanahan, 10. Johnny McPhillips, 11. Henry Speight, 12. Stuart McCloskey, 13. Will Addison, 14. Robert Baloucoune, 15. Micgael Lowry.; Replacements: 16. Rob Herring (for Best 50'), 17. Andrew Warwick (for O'Sullivan 50'), 18. Tom O'Toole (for Moore 56'), 19. Alan O'Connor (for Henderson 59'), 20. Greg Jones (for Coetzee 72'), 21. Johnny Stewart (for Shanahan 63'), 22. Angus Kernohan (for Speight 79'), 23. Peter Nelson (for Lowry 56').				Attendance: 12,559; Referee: Marius Mitrea (FIR)

3 November 2018	(1 BP) Benetton (Italy)	10–15	(Ireland) Ulster	Stadio Comunale di Monigo, Treviso
16:00	Try: Faiva 2' c Con: Allan (1/1) 3'; Pen: Allan (1/1) 63'; Cards: Lamaro (yellow card)	Report; Match centre Highlights	Try: Reidy 43' m Herring 53' c Con: Burns (1/2) 54'; Pen: Burns (1/1) 29'	Attendance: 2,497; Referee: Mike Adamson (SRU)
Ulster lineup: 1. Eric O'Sullivan, 2. Rob Herring, 3. Marty Moore, 4. Alan O'Connor, 5. Kieran Treadwell, 6. Marcell Coetzee, 7. Sean Reidy, 8. Nick Timoney, 9. David Shanahan, 10. Billy Burns, 11. Henry Speight, 12. Stuart McCloskey, 13. James Hume, 14. Robert Baloucoune, 15. Peter Nelson.; Replacements: 16. John Andrew (for Herring 63'), 17. Andrew Warwick (for O'Sullivan 63'), 18. Tom O'Toole (for Moore 63'), 19. Clive Ross (for Coetzee 74'), 20. Greg Jones (for Reidy 63'), 21. Johnny Stewart, 22. Johnny McPhillips, 23. Angus Kernohan (for Baloucoune 23').				Attendance: 2,497; Referee: Mike Adamson (SRU)

23 November 2018	(1 BP) Scarlets (Wales)	29–12	(Ireland) Ulster	Parc y Scarlets, Llanelli
19:35	Try: Kruger 25' c Hardy 36' c Fonotia 39' m Prydie 60' c Con: Jones (3/4) 26', 36', 62'; Pen: Jones (1/1) 18'	Report; Match centre Highlights	Try: Shanahan 14' c Stewart 62' m Con: Burns (1/2) 15'	Attendance: 7,788; Referee: Quinton Immelman (SARU)
Ulster lineup: 1. Eric O'Sullivan, 2. Adam McBurney, 3. Marty Moore, 4. Alan O'Connor, 5. Kieran Treadwell, 6. Marcell Coetzee, 7. Sean Reidy, 8. Nick Timoney, 9. David Shanahan, 10. Billy Burns, 11. Henry Speight, 12. James Hume, 13. Louis Ludik, 14. Robert Baloucoune, 15. Michael Lowry.; Replacements: 16. John Andrew (for McBurney 62'), 17. Andy Warwick (for O'Sullivan 49'), 18. Tom O'Toole (for Moore 54'), 19. Ian Nagle (for Treadwell 49'), 20. Greg Jones (for Timoney 62'), 21. Johnny Stewart (for Shanahan 62'), 22. Darren Cave (for Ludik 56'), 23. Angus Kernohan (for Speight 75').				Attendance: 7,788; Referee: Quinton Immelman (SARU)

1 December 2018	Ulster (Ireland)	16–12	(Wales) Cardiff Blues (1 BP)	Ravenhill Stadium, Belfast
15:00	Try: Treadwell 13' c Con: Cooney (1/1) 13'; Pen: Cooney (3/3) 2', 57', 66'	Report; Match centre Highlights	Try: Morgan 9' m Dacey 19' c Con: Evans (1/2) 20'; Cards: Davies (yellow card)	Attendance: 13,407; Referee: Stuart Berry (SARU)
Ulster lineup: 1. Andrew Warwick, 2. Rob Herring, 3. Marty Moore, 4. Alan O'Connor, 5. Kieran Treadwell, 6. Sean Reidy, 7. Jordi Murphy, 8. Marcell Coetzee, 9. John Cooney, 10. Billy Burns, 11. Louis Ludik, 12. Stuart McCloskey, 13. James Hume, 14. Henry Speight, 15. Michael Lowry.; Replacements: 16. Rory Best (for Herring 50'), 17. Eric O'Sullivan (for Warwick 45'), 18. Ross Kane (for Moore 47'), 19. Ian Nagle (for O'Connor 35'), 20. Nick Timoney (for Murphy 71'), 21. David Shanahan, 22. Johnny McPhillips (for Burns 35'), 23. Jacob Stockdale (for Lowry 44').				Attendance: 13,407; Referee: Stuart Berry (SARU)

21 December 2018	Ulster (Ireland)	19–12	(Ireland) Munster (1 BP)	Ravenhill Stadium, Belfast
19:35	Try: Herring 32' c Baloucoune 60' c Shanahan 76' m Con: Burns (2/3) 34', 61'; Cards: Baloucoune (yellow card)	Report; Match centre Highlights	Pen: Hanrahan (2/2) 11', 51'; Johnston (2/2) 65', 80'	Attendance: 16,804; Referee: Sean Gallagher (IRFU)
Ulster lineup: 1. Eric O'Sullivan, 2. Rob Herring, 3. Marty Moore, 4. Ian Nagle, 5. Kieran Treadwell, 6. Sean Reidy, 7. Jordi Murphy, 8. Marcell Coetzee, 9. John Cooney, 10. Billy Burns, 11. Robert Baloucoune, 12. Stuart McCloskey, 13. Will Addison, 14. Henry Speight, 15. Louis Ludik.; Replacements: 16. Rory Best (for Herring 51'), 17. Kyle McCall (for O'Sullivan 54-73'), 18. Ross Kane (for Moore 55'), 19. Clive Ross, 20. Nick Timoney (for Reidy 59'), 21. David Shanahan (for Cooney 24'), 22. Johnny McPhillips (for Hume 64'), 23. James Hume (for Ludik 51').				Attendance: 16,804; Referee: Sean Gallagher (IRFU)

28 December 2018	Connacht (Ireland)	21–12	(Ireland) Ulster	The Sportsground, Galway
19:35	Try: Delahunt 12' c Aki 19' c Blade 42' c Con: Carty (3/3) 13', 21', 44'; Cards: Dillane (yellow card)	Report; Match centre Highlights	Try: Kernohan 32' c Murphy 67' m Con: Cooney (1/2) 33'	Attendance: 8,129; Referee: Marius Mitrea (FIR)
Ulster lineup: 1. Eric O'Sullivan, 2. Rob Herring, 3. Marty Moore, 4. Ian Nagle, 5. Kieran Treadwell, 6. Nick Timoney, 7. Jordi Murphy, 8. Marcell Coetzee, 9. John Cooney, 10. Johnny McPhillips, 11. Angus Kernohan, 12. Darren Cave, 13. Will Addison, 14. Henry Speight, 15. Louis Ludik.; Replacements: 16. Adam McBurney (for Herring 76'), 17. Tommy O'Hagan (for O'Sullivan 47-66'), 18. Ross Kane (for Moore 47'), 19. Clive Ross (for Nagle 76'), 20. Greg Jones (for Coetzee 45'), 21. David Shanahan (for Speight 59'), 22. Peter Nelson (for McPhillips 51'), 23. Stuart McCloskey (for Kernohan 44').				Attendance: 8,129; Referee: Marius Mitrea (FIR)

5 January 2019	(1 BP) Leinster (Ireland)	40–7	(Ireland) Ulster	RDS Arena, Dublin
17:15	Try: Cronin (2) 5' c, 12' c O'Brien 19' m Porter 40' c Gibson-Park 61' c Penalty try 80'; Con: Frawley (4/5) 7', 13', 40', 62'	Report; Match centre Highlights	Try: McBurney 17' c Con: McPhillips (1/1) 18'	Attendance: 18,099; Referee: Andrew Brace (IRFU)
Ulster lineup: 1. Kyle McCall, 2. Adam McBurney, 3. Wiehahn Herbst, 4. Matthew Dalton, 5. Alan O'Connor, 6. Greg Jones, 7. Sean Reidy, 8. Nick Timoney, 9. David Shanahan, 10. Johnny McPhillips, 11. Angus Kernohan, 12. James Hume, 13. Darren Cave, 14. Rob Lyttle, 15. Michael Lowry.; Replacements: 16. John Andrew (for McBurney 32-40', 50'), 17. Andrew Warwick (for McCall 48'), 18. Tom O'Toole (for Herbst 40'), 19. Caleb Montgomery (for O'Connor 67'), 20. Clive Ross (for Reidy 57'), 21. Johnny Stewart (for Shanahan 71'), 22. Bruce Houston (for Kernohan 48'), 23. Peter Nelson (for Lowry 17').				Attendance: 18,099; Referee: Andrew Brace (IRFU)

25 January 2019	Ulster (Ireland)	17–17	(Italy) Benetton	Ravenhill Stadium, Belfast
19:35	Try: Ludik 0' m Herring 44' m Penalty try	Report; Match centre Highlights	Try: Ruzza 10' c Tavuyara 59' c Con: McKinley (2/2) 11', 59'; Pen: McKinley (1/1) 38'	Attendance: 13,264; Referee: Nigel Owens (WRU)
Ulster lineup: 1. Andrew Warwick, 2. Rob Herring, 3. Marty Moore, 4. Alan O'Connor, 5. Kieran Treadwell, 6. Ian Nagle, 7. Nick Timoney, 8. Greg Jones, 9. David Shanahan, 10. Billy Burns, 11. Louis Ludik, 12. Stuart McCloskey, 13. James Hume, 14. Robert Baloucoune, 15. Michael Lowry.; Replacements: 16. John Andrew (for Herring 73'), 17. Wiehahn Herbst, 18. Tom O'Toole (for Moore 55'), 19. Matthew Dalton (for Jones 73'), 20. Clive Ross (for Treadwell 59'), 21. Johnny Stewart (for Shanahan 54'), 22. Darren Cave (for McCloskey 40'), 23. Rob Lyttle (for Baloucoune 54').				Attendance: 13,264; Referee: Nigel Owens (WRU)

15 February 2019	Ospreys (Wales)	0–8	(Ireland) Ulster	Liberty Stadium, Swansea
19:35		Report; Match centre Highlights	Try: McCloskey 46'; Pen: Cooney 80'	Attendance: 4,264; Referee: Quinton Immelman (SARU)
Ulster lineup: 1. Eric O'Sullivan, 2. Rob Herring, 3. Marty Moore, 4. Alan O'Connor, 5. Iain Henderson, 6. Clive Ross, 7. Jordi Murphy, 8. Nick Timoney, 9. John Cooney, 10. Michael Lowry, 11. Louis Ludik, 12. Stuart McCloskey, 13. Darren Cave, 14. Angus Kernohan, 15. Peter Nelson.; Replacements: 16. John Andrew, 17. Andrew Warwick (for O'Sullivan 71'), 18. Tom O'Toole (for Moore 59'), 19. Kieran Treadwell (for O'Connor 59'), 20. Sean Reidy (for Ross 63'), 21. David Shanahan, 22. James Hume (for Lowry 73'), 23. Rob Lyttle (for Kernohan 71').				Attendance: 4,264; Referee: Quinton Immelman (SARU)

23 February 2019	(1 BP) Ulster (Ireland)	54–7	(Italy) Zebre	Ravenhill Stadium, Belfast
19:35	Try: Herring (3) 15' 19' c 30' c Lyttle 39' c Ludik 49' c Baloucoune 58' c Nelson 72' c Con: Lyttle (6) 12' 32, 40' 51, 60' 73'; Cards: Ludik (yellow card)	Report; Match centre Highlights	Try: Penalty try 24'; Cards: Brown (yellow card)	Attendance: 12,842; Referee: Mike Adamson (SRU)
Ulster lineup: 1. Eric O'Sullivan, 2. Rob Herring, 3. Marty Moore, 4. Alan O'Connor, 5. Kieran Treadwell, 6. Clive Ross, 7. Sean Reidy, 8. Nick Timoney, 9. David Shanahan, 10. Peter Nelson, 11. Robert Lyttle, 12. Stuart McCloskey, 13. Darren Cave, 14. Robert Baloucoune, 15. Louis Ludik.; Replacements: 16. John Andrew (for Herring 64'), 17. Andrew Warwick (for O'Sullivan 49'), 18. Ross Kane (for Moore 49'), 19. Ian Nagle (for O'Connor 51'), 20. Greg Jones (for Timoney 51'), 21. Johnny Stewart (for Shanahan 51'), 22. Johnny McPhillips (for Ludik 60'), 23. James Hume (for McCloskey 45').				Attendance: 12,842; Referee: Mike Adamson (SRU)

3 March 2019	Dragons (Wales)	15–28	(Ireland) Ulster (1 BP)	Rodney Parade, Newport
15:00	Try: Basham 76'; Pen: Lewis 16'	Report; Match centre Highlights	Try: Murphy 24' c Moore 44' c Cooney 48' c O'Connor 73' c Con: Cooney (3) 25' 45' 49'; Burns; Cards: Ludik (yellow card); Cave (yellow card); Lyttle (yellow card)	Attendance: 5,142; Referee: Stuart Berry (SARU)
Ulster lineup: 1. Eric O'Sullivan, 2. Rob Herring, 3. Marty Moore, 4. Alan O'Connor, 5. Kieran Treadwell, 6. Clive Ross, 7. Jordi Murphy, 8. Nick Timoney, 9. John Cooney, 10. Billy Burns, 11. Robert Lyttle, 12. Stuart McCloskey, 13. Darren Cave, 14. Robert Baloucoune, 15. Louis Ludik.; Replacements: 16. John Andrew (for Herring 69'), 17. Andrew Warwick (for O'Sullivan 63'), 18. Wiehahn Herbst (for Moore 51'), 19. Ian Nagle (for O'Connor 75'), 20. Matty Rea (for Ross 63'), 21. David Shanahan (for Cooney 55'), 22. James Hume (for Cave 62'), 23. Peter Nelson (for Burns 77').				Attendance: 5,142; Referee: Stuart Berry (SARU)

23 March 2019	(1 BP) Ulster (Ireland)	33–19	(South Africa) Southern Kings	Ravenhill Stadium, Belfast
17:30	Try: McCloskey 7' c Lyttle 14' c Coetzee 35' c Baloucoune 47' c Andrew 75'; Con: Burns (3) 9' 16' 36'; Cooney 49'	Report; Match centre Highlights	Try: Penxe 21'; Beyers 26' c Willemse 63 ' c Con: Pretorius (2) 27' 64'; Cards: Van Rooyen (yellow card)	Attendance: 13,748; Referee: Lloyd Linton (SRU)
Ulster lineup: 1. Andrew Warwick, 2. Rob Herring, 3. Marty Moore, 4. Alan O'Connor, 5. Ian Nagle, 6. Matty Rea, 7. Nick Timoney, 8. Marcell Coetzee, 9. David Shanahan, 10. Billy Burns, 11. Robert Lyttle, 12. Stuart McCloskey, 13. Darren Cave, 14. Robert Baloucoune, 15. Louis Ludik.; Replacements: 16. John Andrew (for Herring 73'), 17. Wiehahn Herbst (for Warwick 58'), 18. Tom O'Toole (for Moore 27'), 19. Kiean Treadwell (for Nagle 53'), 20. Clive Ross (for Coetzee 54'), 21. John Cooney (for Shanahan 43'), 22. Michael Lowry (for Ludik 9'), 23. Angus Kernohan (for Cave 45').				Attendance: 13,748; Referee: Lloyd Linton (SRU)

5 April 2019	(1 BP) Glasgow Warriors (Scotland)	30–7	(Ireland) Ulster	Scotstoun Stadium, Glasgow
19:35	Try: Brown 13' c Hastings 18' m Seymour 40' m Z. Fagerson 43' c Con: Hastings (2/4) 14', 44'; Pen: Hastings (2/2) 26', 57'	Report; Match centre Highlights	Try: Herring 7' c Con: Cooney (1/1) 8' c	Attendance: 7,351; Referee: Stuart Berry (SARU)
Ulster lineup: 1. Eric O'Sullivan, 2. Rob Herring, 3. Marty Moore, 4. Alan O'Connor, 5. Kieran Treadwell, 6. Sean Reidy, 7. Jordi Murphy, 8. Marcell Coetzee, 9. John Cooney, 10. Billy Burns, 11. Jacob Stockdale, 12. Stuart McCloskey, 13. Luke Marshall, 14. Rob Lyttle, 15. Michael Lowry.; Replacements: 16. John Andrew (for Herring 45'), 17. Andrew Warwick (for O'Sullivan 45'), 18. Tom O'Toole (for Moore 61'), 19. Ian Nagle (for Tradwell 52'), 20. Matty Rea (for Coetzee 66'), 21. David Shanahan (for Burns 60'), 22. Darren Cave (for McCloskey 56'), 23. Angus Kernohan (for Lowry 20').				Attendance: 7,351; Referee: Stuart Berry (SARU)

12 April 2019	Edinburgh (Scotland)	7–29	(Ireland) Ulster (1 BP)	Murrayfield Stadium, Edinburgh
19:35	Try: Barclay 57' c Con: Hickey (1/1) 59'	Report; Match centre Highlights	Try: Murphy 11' c Baloucoune 40' m Lyttke 53' c Burns 77' c Con: Cooney (3/4) 12', 55', 79'; Pen: Cooney (1/1) 4'	Attendance: 7,856; Referee: Nigel Owens (WRU)
Ulster lineup: 1. Eric O'Sullivan, 2. Rob Herring, 3. Marty Moore, 4. Iain Henderson, 5. Kieran Treadwell, 6. Nick Timoney, 7. Jordi Murphy, 8. Marcell Coetzee, 9. John Cooney, 10. Billy Burns, 11. Robert Lyttle, 12. Stuart McCloskey, 13. Luke Marshall, 14. Robert Baloucoune, 15. Jacob Stockdale.; Replacements: 16. John Andrew (for Herring 79'), 17. Andrew Warwick (for O'Sullivan 73'), 18. Ross Kane (for Moore 9'), 19. Alan O'Connor (for Treadwell 62'), 20. Sean Reidy (for Timoney 67'), 21. David Shanahan (for Cooney 79'), 22. Peter Nelson (for Stockdale 79'), 23. Angus Kernohan (for Baloucoune 49').				Attendance: 7,856; Referee: Nigel Owens (WRU)

27 April 2019	Ulster (Ireland)	14–13	(Ireland) Leinster (1 BP)	Ravenhill Stadium, Belfast
17:15	Try: Shanahan 31' c Marcus Rea 60' c Con: McPhillips 33'; Nelson 61'	Report; Match centre Highlights	Try: O'Brien 29'; McFadden 40+3'; Pen: Byrne 39'	Attendance: 17,358; Referee: George Clancy (IRFU)
Ulster lineup: 1. Andrew Warwick, 2. John Andrew, 3. Ross Kane, 4. Ian Nagle, 5. Alan O'Connor, 6. Matty Rea, 7. Clive Ross, 8. Sean Reidy, 9. David Shanahan, 10. Johnny McPhillips, 11. Angus Kernohan, 12. Peter Nelson, 13. Darren Cave, 14. David Busby, 15. Michael Lowry.; Replacements: 16. Adam McBurney (for Andrew 52'), 17. Tommy O'Hagan (for Warwick 63'), 18. Tom O'Toole (for Kane 40'), 19. Nick Timoney (for O'Connor 63'), 20. Marcus Rea (for Reidy 15'), 21. Johnny Stewart (for Shanahan 57'), 22. Jack Owens (for McPhillips 57'), 23. Rob Lyttle.				Attendance: 17,358; Referee: George Clancy (IRFU)

=== Quarter-final ===
4 May 2019	Ulster (Ireland)	21–13	(Ireland) Connacht	Ravenhill Stadium, Belfast
17:35	Try: Timoney 14' m Coetzee 77' c Con: Burns (1/1) 78'; Pen: Cooney (3/3) 4', 40', 61'	Report; Match centre Highlights; Full game	Try: Aki 54' c Con: Carty (1/1) 55'; Pen: Carty (2/3) 29', 67'	Attendance: 15,215; Referee: Andrew Brace (IRFU)
Ulster lineup: 1. Eric O'Sullivan, 2. Rory Best, 3. Ross Kane, 4. Iain Henderson, 5. Kieran Treadwell, 6. Nick Timoney, 7. Jordi Murphy, 8. Marcell Coetzee, 9. John Cooney, 10. Billy Burns, 11. Rob Lyttle, 12. Stuart McCloskey, 13. Luke Marshall, 14. Robert Baloucoune, 15. Michael Lowry.; Replacements: 16. Rob Herring (for Best 68'), 17. Andrew Warwick, 18. Tom O'Toole (for Kane 68'), 19. Alan O'Connor (for Treadwell 72'), 20. Sean Reidy (for Timoney 78'), 21. David Shanahan (for Cooney 23-33', 68'), 22. Darren Cave (for Marshall 49-62'), 23. Angus Kernohan.				Attendance: 15,215; Referee: Andrew Brace (IRFU)

=== Semi-final ===
17 May 2019	Glasgow Warriors (Scotland)	50–20	(Ireland) Ulster	Scotstoun Stadium, Glasgow
19:35	Try: Seymour (2) 2' c, 54' m Price 16' c Harley 38' c Steyn 58' c P. Horne 67' c G. Horne 75' c Con: Hastings (6/7) 3', 18', 39', 58', 68', 76'; Pen: Hastings (1/1) 28'	Report; Match centre Highlights; Full match	Try: Coetzee 60' m Herring 71' c Lowry 79' m Con: Burns (1/3) 71'; Pen: Cooney (1/1) 30'	Attendance: 10,000; Referee: John Lacey (IRFU)
Ulster lineup: 1. Eric O'Sullivan, 2. Rory Best, 3. Ross Kane, 4. Iain Henderson, 5. Kieran Treadwell, 6. Nick Timoney, 7. Jordi Murphy, 8. Marcell Coetzee, 9. John Cooney, 10. Billy Burns, 11. Jacob Stockdale, 12. Stuart McCloskey, 13. Luke Marshall, 14. Louis Ludik, 15. Michael Lowry.; Replacements: 16. Rob Herring (for Best 61'), 17. Andrew Warwick (for O'Sullivan 31-40', 50'), 18. Tom O'Toole (for Kane 50'), 19. Alan O'Connor (for Treadwell 52'), 20. Sean Reidy (for Timoney 48'), 21. David Shanahan (for Cooney 47'), 22. Darren Cave (for Marshall 59'), 23. Angus Kernohan (for Stockdale 68').				Attendance: 10,000; Referee: John Lacey (IRFU)

=== End of season awards ===
Inside centre Stuart McCloskey and scrum-half John Cooney were named the Pro14 Dream Team.

== Home attendance ==
Domestic League					European Cup					Total	
League	Fixtures	Average Attendance	Highest	Lowest	League	Fixtures	Average Attendance	Highest	Lowest	Total Attendance	Average Attendance
2018–19 Pro14	11	13,835	17,358	11,882	2018–19 European Rugby Champions Cup	3	14,039	16,842	12,124	194,300	13,879

== Friendlies ==
19 August 2018	Ulster (Ireland)	17–29	(England) Gloucester	Ravenhill Stadium, Belfast
	Try: Marcus Rea; Timoney; Hume; Con: Nelson	Report	Try: Grobler; Williams; Sharples; Gleave; Purdy; Con: Williams (2)
Ulster lineup: 1. Schalk van der Merwe, 2. John Andrew, 3. Tom O'Toole, 4. Alan O'Connor (c), 5. Alex Thompson, 6. Marcus Rea, 7. Chris Henry, 8. Nick Timoney, 9. Johnny Stewart, 10. Michael Lowry, 11. Angus Kernohan, 12. Darren Cave, 13. Stewart Moore, 14. Craig Gilroy, 15. Peter Nelson.; Replacements: Adam McBurney, Kyle McCall, Eric O'Sullivan, Marty Moore, Ross Kane, Kieran Treadwell, Jack Regan, Caleb Montgomery, Clive Ross, Sean Reidy, Greg Jones, David Shanahan, Billy Burns, Angus Curtis, James Hume, Aaron Sexton, Jack Owens, Will Addison.

24 August 2018	Wasps (England)	31-14	(Ireland) Ulster	Ricoh Arena, Coventry
	Try: Hughes (3); Carr; Zhvania; Con: Searle (3)	Report	Try: Timoney; Kernohan; Con: McPhillips (2)
Ulster lineup: 1. Eric O'Sullivan, 2. John Andrew, 3. Marty Moore, 4. Alan O'Connor (c), 5. Kieran Treadwell, 6. Marcell Coetzee, 7. Sean Reidy, 8. Nick Timoney, 9. Johnny Stewart, 10. Johnny McPhillips, 11. Angus Kernohan, 12. Stuart McCloskey, 13. Stewart Moore, 14. Craig Gilroy, 15. Will Addison.; Replacements: Adam McBurney, Andrew Warwick, Tom O'Toole, Alex Thompson, Caleb Montgomery, Greg Jones, Chris Henry, David Shanahan, Angus Curtis, Darren Cave, Jack Owens.

9 November 2018	Ulster (Ireland)	21-5	Uruguay	Ravenhill Stadium, Belfast
	Try: McBurney (2); Marcus Rea; Con: McPhillips (3)	Report	Try: Mieres
Ulster lineup: 1. Schalk van der Merwe, 2. Adam McBurney (c), 3. Tom O'Toole, 4. Matty Rea, 5. Alex Thompson, 6. Joe Dunleavy, 7. Marcus Rea, 8. Greg Jones, 9. Jonny Stewart, 10. Jonny McPhillips, 11. Angus Kernohan, 12. James Hume, 13. Stewart Moore, 14. Iwan Hughes, 15. Bruce Houston.; Replacements: 16. Zack McCall (for McBurney 72'), 17. Corrie Barrett (for O'Toole 79'), 18. Peter Cooper (for Van der Merwe 62'), 19. J.J. McKee (for Thompson 75'), 20. David McCann (for Dunleavy 40'), 21. Ben McCaughey, 22. Graham Curtis (for Stewart 32'), 23. Michael Stronge (for Hughes 73').

== Ulster Women ==
=== 2018-19 Women's Interprovincial Series ===
	Team	P	W	D	L	PF	PA	BP	Pts
1	Leinster	3	2	1	0	78	14	0	10
2	Munster	3	2	1	0	78	41	0	10
3	Connacht	3	1	0	2	38	88	0	4
4	Ulster	3	0	0	3	37	88	0	0

31 August 2018	Leinster	17-0	Ulster	Stradbrook Road, Dublin

9 September 2018	Ulster	20-40	Munster	Chambers Park, Portadown

15 September 2018	Connacht	31-17	Ulster	The Sportsground, Galway

== Ulster Rugby Awards ==
The Heineken Ulster Rugby Awards ceremony was held at the Crowne Plaza Hotel, Belfast, on 9 May 2019. Winners were:

- Player of the Year: Stuart McCloskey
- Personality of the Year: Rory Best
- Young Player of the Year: Eric O'Sullivan
- Rugby Writers Player of the Year: Marcell Coetzee
- Supporters Club Player of the Year: Stuart McCloskey
- Academy Player of the Year: Michael Lowry
- Ulster A Player of the Year: Aaron Sexton
- Women's Player of the Year: Claire McLaughlin, Old Belvedere R.F.C.
- Youth Player of the Year: Matthew Sands, City of Armagh RFC
- Boys' Schools Player of the Year: Tom Stewart, Belfast Royal Academy
- Girls' Schools Player of the Year: Zara Flack, Enniskillen Royal Grammar School
- Real Rugby Heroes Award (adult category): Victor Kearney, Donegal Town RFC
- Real Rugby Heroes Award (youth category): Heather Thornton, Rainey Old Boys R.F.C.
- Dorrington B. Faulkner Award: Barney McGonigle
- Club Player of the Year: Ross Adair, Ballynahinch RFC
- Referee of the Year: Peter Martin
- Club of the Year: Queen's University RFC
- U18 Girls Player of the Year: Kelly McCormill, Cooke RFC

== Season reviews ==
- "Ulster’s progression in 2019", The Front Row Union, 8 May 2019
- "Making an impact at Ulster Rugby", The Front Row Union, 23 May 2019
- Ulster Men: Who did what 2018-19, The From Row Union, 18 July 2019
- "Dan McFarland: Season Review", Ulster Rugby, 6 June 2019
- "Ulster continue to make strides", United Rugby, 12 June 2019
