= Marcus Rea =

Irish rugby union player

- Born: 8 September 1997 (age 29) Glarryford, County Antrim, Northern Ireland
- Height: 1.88 m (6 ft 2 in)
- Weight: 110 kg (17 st; 240 lb)
- School: Ballymena Academy
- Notable relative: Matty Rea (brother)

Rugby union career
- Position: Back-row
Amateur team(s)
Years	Team	Apps	(Points)
20??–	Ballymena		
2021-24	Ballynahinch	19	(10)
- Correct as of 24 January 2026
Senior career
Years	Team	Apps	(Points)
2019–26	Ulster	59	(30)
- Correct as of 24 April 2026

Marcus Rea (born 8 September 1997) is an Irish rugby union player who plays in the back row for Ulster in the United Rugby Championship and European Rugby Champions Cup.

He was captain at Ballymena Academy, and captained the Ulster under-19 team in 2016. He joined the Ulster Academy ahead of the 2016–17 season; his older brother Matty joined the senior team on a development contract the same season. He made his senior competitive debut for Ulster in their 14–13 win against provincial rivals Leinster in round 21 of the 2018–19 Pro14 on 27 April 2018. Rea replaced Sean Reidy after just 15 minutes and joined his brother in the back-row, before scoring a crucial try in the 60th minute, converted by Peter Nelson, to secure victory for the Ulstermen, and winning the Man-of-the-Match award. He signed a development contract ahead of the 2019–20 season, but broke his jaw playing for Ballynahinch in the All-Ireland League in November 2019 and didn't make his second appearance for Ulster until October 2020. He made 7 appearances, including four starts, in 2020–21, but he established himself in the team in the 2021–22 season, in which he made 19 appearances and 15 starts, including starting in all six of Ulster's Champions Cup matches. He signed a new contract in February 2022. He left Ulster at the end of the 2025-26 season.
