= James Hume (rugby union) =

Irish rugby union player (born 1998)

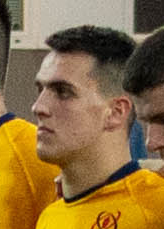
- Born: 7 September 1998 (age 28) Belfast, Northern Ireland
- Height: 1.86 m (6 ft 1 in)
- Weight: 97 kg (15.3 st; 214 lb)
- School: Royal Belfast Academical Institution

Rugby union career
- Position: Centre
Amateur team(s)
Years	Team	Apps	(Points)
2018–	Banbridge	11	(36)
Senior career
Years	Team	Apps	(Points)
2018–	Ulster	120	(90)
- Correct as of 31 October 2026
International career
Years	Team	Apps	(Points)
2018	Ireland U20	7	(5)
2021–	Ireland	3	(0)
2022	Ireland 'A'	3	(0)
- Correct as of 20 November 2026

James Hume (born 7 September 1998) is an Irish rugby union player who plays centre for United Rugby Championship and European Rugby Champions Cup side Ulster.

Born in Belfast, Hume attended Royal Belfast Academical Institution and was a key part of the team that won three Ulster Schools' Cups in a row between 2015 and 2017. After leaving school, he joined the Ulster academy ahead of the 2017–18 season, while playing club rugby for Banbridge. He made his debut for Ireland under-20s in their 41–38 defeat at the hands of Wales during the 2018 Six Nations Under 20s Championship on 23 February 2018. He also represented the under-20s at the 2018 World Rugby Under 20 Championship.

He made his senior debut for Ulster on 29 September 2018, featuring off the bench in the province;s 64–7 defeat at the hands of Munster. He made 11 appearances, including 5 starts, in 2018–19. He signed his first senior contract with Ulster in February 2019, to join the senior squad ahead of the 2019–20 season. That season, he made ten appearances, including nine starts, and scored two tries.

In 2020–21 he established himself as Ulster's first choice outside centre, making 20 appearances including 19 starts, 132 tackles, and 155 carries with 43 defenders beaten, and was named Young Player of the Year in the Ulster Rugby Awards. He made his senior debut for Ireland in a 71–10 victory over the United States on 10 July 2021.

In 2021–22 he made 18 appearances, all starts, scoring four tries, was named in the 2021–22 United Rugby Championship Dream Team, and was awarded Ulster's Men's Player of the Year and Rugby Writers' Player of the Year awards. He was called up to the Ireland squad for their 2022 tour of New Zealand. He made his hundredth appearance for Ulster against the Dragons on the opening night of 2025–26 season.
