= Eric O'Sullivan =

Irish rugby union player

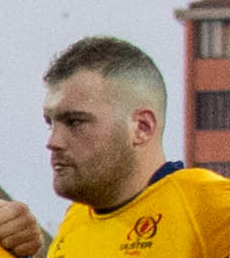
- Born: 30 November 1995 (age 30) Dublin, Ireland
- Height: 1.84 m (6 ft 1/2 in)
- Weight: 118 kg (18 st 8 lb; 260 lb)
- School: Templeogue College
- University: Trinity College

Rugby union career
- Position: Prop
Amateur team(s)
Years	Team	Apps	(Points)
20–2017	Dublin University		
2017–	Banbridge	18	(5)
Senior career
Years	Team	Apps	(Points)
2018–	Ulster	144	(20)
- Correct as of 31 October 2026
International career
Years	Team	Apps	(Points)
2020–	Ireland	1	(0)
- Correct as of 5 December 2020

Eric O'Sullivan (born 30 November 1995) is an Irish rugby union player who plays loosehead prop for United Rugby Championship and European Rugby Champions Cup side Ulster and internationally for Ireland.

Born in Dublin, O'Sullivan attended Templeogue College and Trinity College, where he completed a business studies course. He played in the back row at school, and converted to the front row at Trinity.

O'Sullivan represented his native Leinster at under-17, under-18, under-19 and under-20 level, but missed out on a place in Leinster's academy. Strong performances for Dublin University in the All-Ireland League caught the attention of Ulster and, after an appearance for Ulster's 'A' side in early 2017, He joined the Ulster academy.

He made his senior debut for Ulster off the bench in their 15–13 win against Welsh side Scarlets in the opening round of the 2018–19 Pro14 on 1 September 2018, and made his first start for the province in their 39–39 draw against South African side Cheetahs on 21 September 2018. He made 26 appearances, including 16 starts, and made 251 tackles, while still an academy player, in 2018–19, and was named Young Player of the Year in the 2019 Ulster Rugby Awards. He signed his first senior contract with Ulster in February 2019. He made 18 appearances, including 10 starts, in 2019–20.

He made 21 appearances, including 16 starts, and 155 tackles, in 2020–21. He made his 50th appearance for Ulster in November 2020. He made his debut for Ireland against Scotland in the Autumn Nations Cup on 5 December 2020, replacing Cian Healy. At the end of the season he was named in the 2020–21 Pro14 Dream Team.

In the 2021–22 season, he has made 17 appearances, including 7 starts.

He was appointed scrum coach of Ulster Women in July 2023.

He married Ulster and Ireland women's rugby player Fiona Tuite in July 2026.
