= Matty Rea =

Matthew Rea
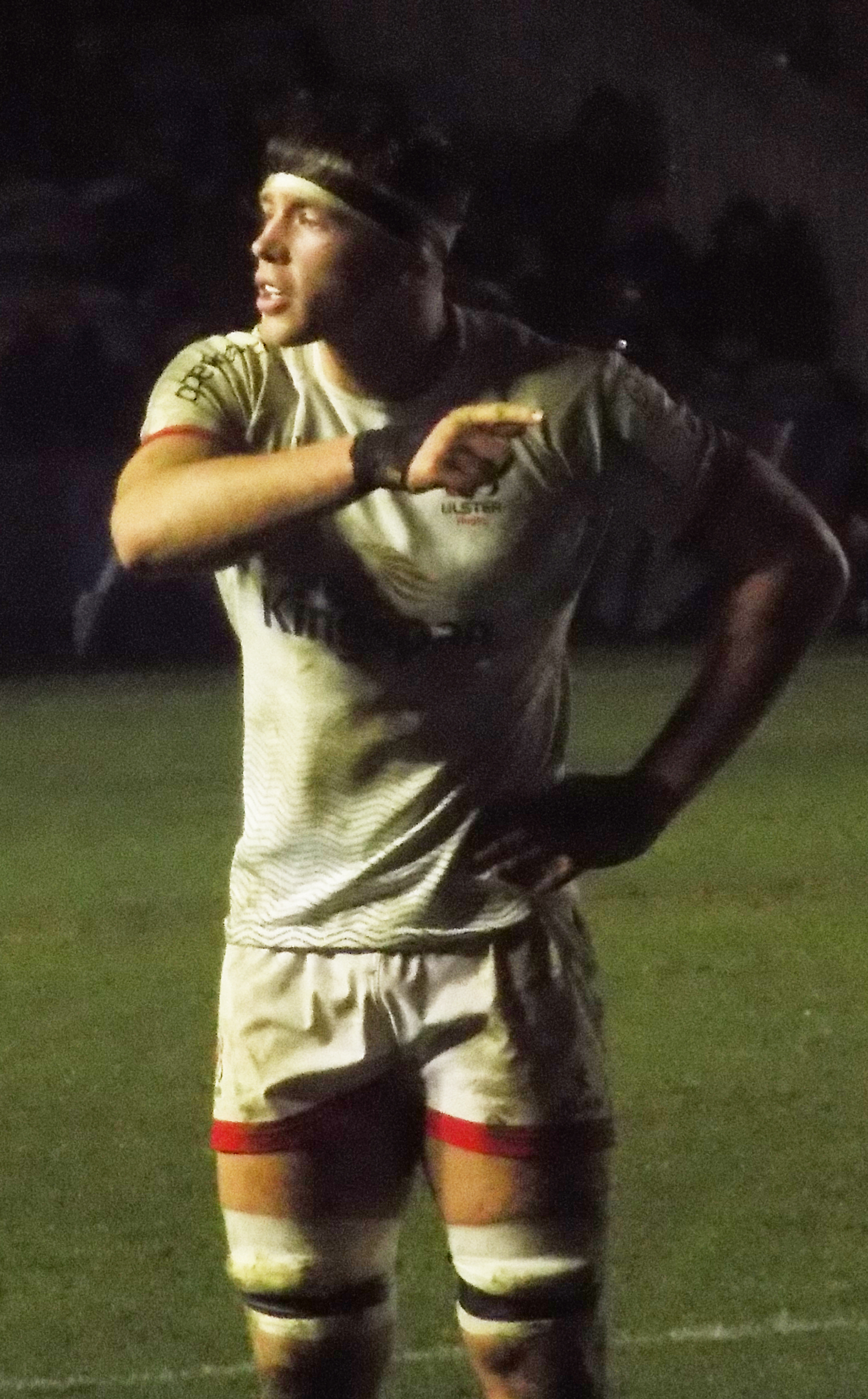
- Rea playing for Ulster, 2019
- Born: 21 September 1993 (age 33) Ballymena, Northern Ireland
- Height: 1.93 m (6 ft 4 in)
- Weight: 114 kg (18.0 st; 251 lb)
- School: Ballymena Academy
- Notable relative: Marcus Rea (brother)

Rugby union career
- Position(s): Flanker, Number 8
- Current team: Ulster
Amateur team(s)
Years	Team	Apps	(Points)
- Ballymena
Senior career
Years	Team	Apps	(Points)
2017–2025	Ulster	113	(30)
- Correct as of 9 May 2025

Matthew Rea (born 21 September 1993) is an Irish professional rugby union player who plays for Ulster as a back row forward.

He was educated at Ballymena Academy, and helped the school win the 2010 Ulster Schools' Cup final. He represented Ireland at under-19 level in 2011, but was not offered a place in the Ulster Academy when he left school. His performances for Ballymena in the All-Ireland League led to Ulster offering him a development contract ahead of the 2016–17 season. He made his first professional rugby and Ulster appearance in September 2017 against the Cheetahs. He made 18 appearances, including one start, 111 tackles, 6 turnovers, and 24 lineouts won, in 2017–18; nine appearances, and one start, in 2018–19; 19 appearances, and 14 starts, in 2019–20; 14 appearances, and 10 starts in 2020–21; and 10 appearances, including 7 starts, in 2021–22. He made his 100th appearance for the province in the 2023–24 United Rugby Championship quarter-final. He left Ulster at the end of the 2024-25 season.

His younger brother Marcus, also a back row forward, made his debut for Ulster in 2018.
