= Marty Moore (rugby union) =

Irish rugby union player

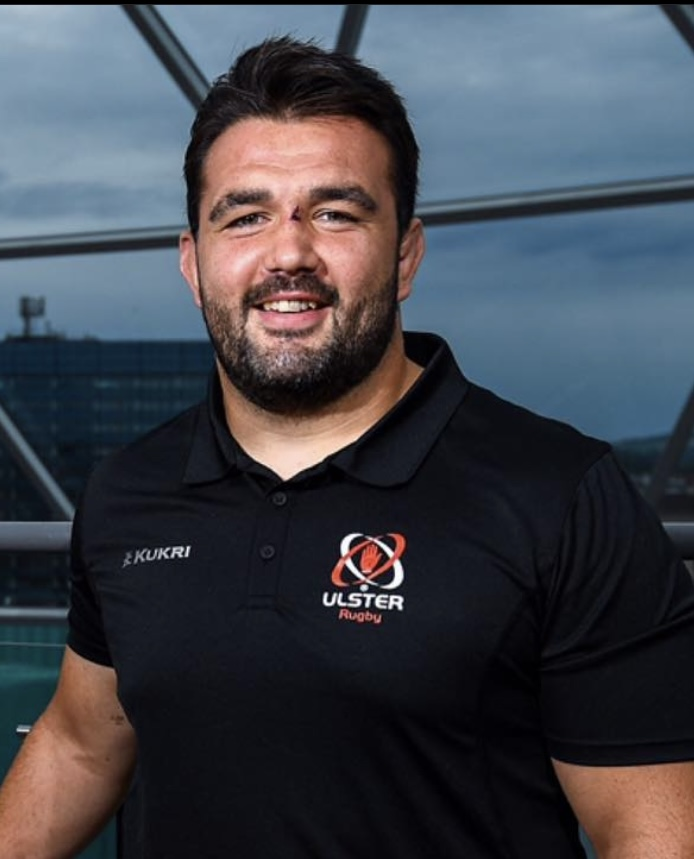
- Born: Martin Moore; 1 March 1991 (age 35) Dublin, Ireland
- Height: 1.80 m (5 ft 11 in)
- Weight: 118 kg (18 st 8 lb)
- School: Castleknock College

Rugby union career
- Position: Prop
- Current team: Ulster
Amateur team(s)
Years	Team	Apps	(Points)
- Lansdowne
Senior career
Years	Team	Apps	(Points)
2012–2016	Leinster	58	(10)
2016–2018	Wasps	51	(5)
2018–2024	Ulster	94	(30)
- Correct as of 18 February 2024
International career
Years	Team	Apps	(Points)
2010–2011	Ireland U20	7	(5)
2014–2022	Ireland Wolfhounds	2	(5)
2014–2015	Ireland	10	(0)
- Correct as of 15 November 2022

Marty Moore (born 1 March 1991) is an Irish former rugby union player who played tighthead prop for Leinster, Wasps and Ulster, and won ten caps for Ireland.

Moore was educated at Castleknock College outside Dublin. He received summer coaching from the age of 14 from Leinster's Talent Identification Programme and went on tour with them to South Africa as a 16-year-old in 2007. He played for Leinster at schools, under-18 and under-19 level, and played for Ireland at under-18, 19 & 20 level. He was part of the combined Leinster-Ulster team that played a combined Munster-Connacht side to inaugurate the Aviva Stadium in 2010. He joined the Leinster Academy, and made his senior debut in September 2012 against the Scarlets. He signed a development contract ahead of the 2013–14 season, during which he made 28 appearances, including 16 starts, and made his first five appearances for Ireland in the 2014 Six Nations Championship, all as a replacement. Five more appearances from the bench followed in the 2015 Six Nations Championship, but he missed the 2015 World Cup through injury.

He rejected a two-year contract extension with Leinster and on 25 January 2016 signed a deal with English Premiership side Wasps from the 2016–17 season. After two injury-interrupted seasons with Wasps, he signed for Ulster ahead of the 2018–19 season, hoping to be in consideration for more Ireland appearances. He made 20 appearances in his first season with Ulster, making 182 tackles with a 93% success rate, and was called up to an Ireland training squad in December 2019. He remained Ulster's leading tighthead the following season. In 2020–21 he made 23 appearances and made 162 tackles with a 92.49% success rate. In 2021–22 he split time with Tom O'Toole for the tighthead position. In the 2022–23 season he made eleven appearances, including nine starts, before his season was ended by an anterior cruciate ligament tear sustained against Munster on 1 January 2023. After a year on the sidelines, he made five more appearances for Ulster before announcing his retirement on medical grounds in September 2024, having made 94 appearances for Ulster.
