= Sean Reidy =

Irish rugby union player (born 1989)

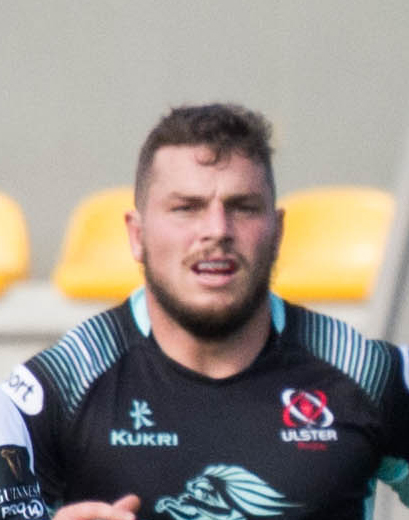
- Born: 10 May 1989 (age 37) Auckland, New Zealand
- Height: 6 ft 0 in (1.83 m)
- Weight: 104 kg (16 st 5 lb)

Rugby union career
- Position: Flanker
- Current team: Ulster
Senior career
Years	Team	Apps	(Points)
2013, 2022-	Counties Manukau	26	(10)
2014–2022	Ulster	151	(100)
- Correct as of 20 April 2022
International career
Years	Team	Apps	(Points)
2016–2017	Ireland	2	(5)
- Correct as of 24 Jun 2017

Sean Reidy (born 10 May 1989) is a New Zealand-born Irish rugby union player who played flanker for Ulster Rugby from 2014 to 2022, and has two caps for Ireland.

Born in Auckland, New Zealand, he is Irish-qualified through his grandfather, who was born in County Kerry. His uncle Rod Ketels played for the All-Blacks. He played for Counties Manukau in the 2013 ITM Cup, and scored the winning try in the 2013 Ranfurly Shield against Hawke's Bay, but was unable to progress to Super Rugby level. He wrote to all four Irish provinces requesting a trial, and signed a short-term contract with Ulster ahead of the 2014–15 season.

Injuries curtailed his appearances in his first season with Ulster, but he became much more prominent in 2015–16, making 23 appearances including 16 starts, scoring five tries and making 176 tackles. He was selected for the 32-man Ireland squad to tour South Africa in June 2016. In 2016–17 he made 27 appearances including 24 starts, making 329 tackles and scoring four tries. He was named Rugby Writers' Player of the Year in the 2017 Ulster Rugby Awards. In 2017–18 he made 22 appearances including 18 starts, scoring four tries and making 196 tackles. In 2018–19 he made 25 appearances including 16 starts, making 215 tackles and scoring one try. He made his 100th appearance for Ulster in March 2019 against the Dragons. In 2019–20 he made 19 appearances including 16 starts, scoring two tries. In 2020–21 he made 19 appearances including 13 starts, scoring five tries and making 218 tackles and seven turnovers, but missed the second half of the season with a shoulder injury that required surgery. His opportunities in 2021–22 were limited, with seven appearances and two starts, and he was released at the end of the season, to return to New Zealand.
