= Will Addison =

Ireland international rugby union footballer

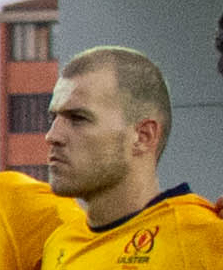
- Addison in 2021
- Born: William Joseph Addison; 20 August 1992 (age 34) Penrith, Cumbria, England
- Height: 1.85 m (6 ft 1 in)
- Weight: 93 kg (14 st 9 lb; 205 lb)
- School: Queen Elizabeth Grammar School, Penrith
- University: University of Manchester

Rugby union career
- Position(s): Centre, Wing, Full-back
- Current team: Ulster
Senior career
Years	Team	Apps	(Points)
2010–2018	Sale Sharks	114	(158)
2011	→ Macclesfield (loan)	2	(0)
2018–2024	Ulster	44	(58)
2024–2025	Sale Sharks	11	(10)
- Correct as of 8 June 2024
International career
Years	Team	Apps	(Points)
2012	England U20	4	(0)
2018–2020	Ireland	5	(2)
- Correct as of 10 July 2021

William Joseph Addison (born 20 August 1992) is an English-born Irish international rugby union player who played as a utility back for Sale Sharks, Ulster and Ireland. He is currently a player-coach at Sale FC in National League 1.

A product of the Sale Sharks academy, Addison made his club debut for Sale in 2010. He was part of the England U20 side which won the Junior Six Nations. He also featured at the 2012 Junior World Cup. He split time between his rugby career and studying for a degree in business studies, graduating in 2014. He was named the Sharks' captain ahead of the 2017–18 season, having previously captained the side in the absence of Josh Beaumont.

Addison is Irish-qualified through his County Fermanagh-born mother, and grew up supporting Ireland. His contract with Sale contained an option to leave if an Irish team approached him, and he signed for Ulster ahead of the 2018–19 season in pursuit of his ambitions to play international rugby. He had a successful start to the season, initially at fullback, later at outside centre. On 24 October 2018, he was named in the Ireland squad for the November Internationals. On 3 November 2018 he made his debut for Ireland against Italy. He sustained a back injury in January 2019 that required surgery and kept him out for fifteen months. He returned to action in April 2021, before his season was ended by a red card for a dangerous tackle against Munster in May.

He started the 2021–22 season strongly, playing four games and scoring a try, before sustaining a fracture of the lower leg in October which again meant undergoing surgery. He signed for Sale at the end of the 2023–24 season, and left at the end of the season, joining semi-professional side Sale FC as a player-coach.
