= Alan O'Connor (rugby union) =

Irish rugby union player (born 1992)

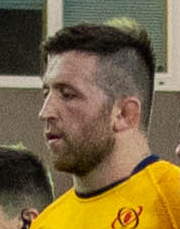
- Born: Alan O'Connor; 10 September 1992 (age 34) Dublin, Ireland
- Height: 1.96 m (6 ft 5 in)
- Weight: 111 kg (17 st 7 lb)
- University: University College Dublin
- Notable relative: David O'Connor (brother)

Rugby union career
- Position: Lock
- Current team: Ulster
Amateur team(s)
Years	Team	Apps	(Points)
- Skerries
2011–2012	UCD		
2012–	Malone		
Senior career
Years	Team	Apps	(Points)
2012–2025	Ulster	212	(45)
- Correct as of 9 May 2025
International career
Years	Team	Apps	(Points)
2012	Ireland U20	5	(0)
- Correct as of 10 January 2021

Alan O'Connor (born 10 September 1992) is an Irish professional rugby union coach and former player. As of January 2026 he is forwards coach of the Ireland women's team. He formerly played lock for Ulster. He was Ulster's player of the year in 2020–21, and won the United Rugby Championship's Tackle Machine award for 2021–22.

A native of Skerries, County Dublin, he played club rugby for Skerries RFC until he was eighteen, then for University College Dublin R.F.C. for two years, and was part of Leinster's sub-academy. He appeared for the Ireland under-20s in the 2012 IRB Junior World Championship, bringing him to the attention of Allen Clarke, who signed him for Ulster's academy. He made 13 appearances for the senior Ulster team while still an academy player, making his debut against Leinster in December 2012. He was awarded the Jack Kyle Bursary by the Ulster Rugby Supporters Club for the 2014–15 season, and signed a development contract in March 2015, moving to a full senior contract for the 2016–17 season.

He made 14 starts in the 2016–17 season, winning 48 lineouts, third on the team behind Iain Henderson and Franco van der Merwe. In the 2017–18 season he made 24 appearances and led the team with 226 tackles, and captained the side for the first time against the Southern Kings in February 2018. In the 2018–19 season he made 25 appearances and 265 tackles. He made his 100th appearance for Ulster against Leinster in December 2019. He made 23 appearances and led the team in tackles with 242 during the 2020–21 season, and was named Ulster's Player of the Year at the 2021 Ulster Rugby Awards. He made his 150th appearance against the Stormers in March 2022. He won the URC Tackle Machine award for the 2021–22 season, after making 195 tackles with a 97.5% success rate. He made his 200th appearance for Ulster against Connacht in October 2024. He left Ulster at the end of the 2024–25 season, before becoming head of rugby development at Ballymena Academy. In January 2026 he was named as forwards coach for the Ireland women's team.

Ulster former forwards coach Roddy Grant praised him for his leadership, intelligence and toughness: "He's a pleasure to coach, a real treat to have in your forward pack. He's just so consistent. He's really intelligent, reads the game well. He speaks well in terms of the leadership role when he needs to speak tactically, he runs the lineout incredibly well, he's very good at leading a lineout defence and maul; he's a proper tough player ... You hear him before the game in the dressing room and it gives me goosebumps."

His younger brother David O'Connor played lock for Ulster, Ealing Trailfinders and Connacht.
