= Angus Kernohan =

Irish rugby union player

- Born: 2 March 1999 (age 27) Ballymena, Northern Ireland
- Height: 1.80 m (5 ft 11 in)
- Weight: 93 kg (14 st 9 lb; 205 lb)
- School: Ballymena Academy
- University: Queen's University Belfast

Rugby union career
- Position(s): Wing, Centre
Amateur team(s)
Years	Team	Apps	(Points)
- Ballymena
–	Queen's University		
Senior career
Years	Team	Apps	(Points)
2018–2020	Ulster	14	(10)
2020–	Ealing Trailfinders	0	(0)
- Correct as of 23 March 2019
International career
Years	Team	Apps	(Points)
2018–2019	Ireland U20	8	(0)
- Correct as of 15 March 2019

Angus Kernohan (born 2 March 1999) is an Irish rugby union player playing for RFU Championship side Ealing Trailfinders. He plays as a winger, but can also play at centre.

== Early life ==
Born in Ballymena, Northern Ireland, Kernohan attended Ballymena Academy and first began playing rugby for Ballymena minis.

== Club career ==
Kernohan joined the Ulster sub-academy for the 2017–18 season, but was not initially awarded a full academy contract ahead of the 2018–19 season. However, strong performances during pre-season saw him rewarded with a place in the academy shortly after the season began. He made his senior debut for Ulster in the provinces opening 2018–19 Pro14 fixture against Welsh side Scarlets on 1 September 2018, which Ulster won 15–13, and made his European Rugby Champions Cup debut during round 1 of the 2018–19 tournament, featuring off the bench in the provinces 24–10 win against English side Leicester Tigers on 13 October 2018.

On 13 May 2020, Kernohan travels to England to sign for Ealing Trailfinders in the RFU Championship from the 2020-21 season.

== International career ==
Kernohan was part of the Ireland under-20s team that won a grand slam during the 2019 Six Nations Under 20s Championship. He missed the opening two rounds due to a hamstring injury, but returned for the final fixtures.
