= Aaron Dundon =

NZ rugby union player (born 1982)

- Born: Aaron Dundon; 22 June 1982 (age 44) Wellington, New Zealand
- Height: 1.83 m (6 ft 0 in)
- Weight: 101 kg (15 st 13 lb)
- School: Wellington College

Rugby union career
- Position: Hooker
- Current team: Ulster
Amateur team(s)
Years	Team	Apps	(Points)
2003–2006	Seapoint		
2006–2010	Clontarf		
Senior career
Years	Team	Apps	(Points)
2010–2016	Leinster	49	(10)
- Correct as of 22 January 2016
Coaching career
- Years: Team
- 2016–2017: Grenoble (Forwards coach)
- 2017–2019: Ulster (Scrum coach)
- Correct as of 6 June 2017

Aaron Dundon (born 22 June 1982) is a retired rugby union player from New Zealand. He played for the Irish team Leinster Rugby in the Pro12 and European Rugby Champions Cup. His primary playing position was at hooker. Since retirement, Dundon has become the forwards coach for Top 14 club Grenoble.

Dundon, originally from Wellington and having attended Wellington College, started his Irish rugby career with Dublin club Seapoint. He later joined Clontarf, also based in Dublin. His performances with the club led to him joining the provincial team Leinster.

Dundon joined Leinster in 2010, and made his debut on 27 December 2010, against Leinster's Irish rivals Ulster. He made a total of four appearances for the season, all from the bench in the Pro 12.

Dundon's Heineken Cup debut came in the 2012–13 season. He came off the bench against Welsh side Scarlets on 12 January 2013.
