= Ian Nagle =

Ireland international rugby union player

- Born: Ian William Nagle; 17 October 1988 (age 38) Cork, Ireland
- Height: 1.98 m (6 ft 6 in)
- Weight: 112 kg (17.6 st; 247 lb)
- School: Glenstal Abbey School
- University: University College Cork

Rugby union career
- Position: Lock
Amateur team(s)
| Years | Team | Apps | (Points) |
| 2007–2009 | UCC | | |
| 2009–2014 | Cork Constitution | | |
| 2015 | Cambridge University | | |
Senior career
| Years | Team | Apps | (Points) |
| 2010–2014 | Munster | 29 | (0) |
| 2014 | → Newcastle (loan) | 2 | (0) |
| 2016 | London Irish | 4 | (0) |
| 2016–2019 | Leinster | 19 | (0) |
| 2018–2019 | → Ulster (loan) | 11 | (5) |
| 2019–2021 | Zebre | 25 | (0) |
- Correct as of 25 May 2021
International career
| Years | Team | Apps | (Points) |
| 2008 | Ireland U20 | 8 | (0) |
| 2011 | Ireland Wolfhounds | 2 | (0) |
| 2013 | Emerging Ireland | 3 | (0) |
- Correct as of 16 June 2013

Ian William Nagle (born 17 October 1988) is a retired Irish rugby union player, who last played for Italian United Rugby Championship side Zebre. Nagle began his career with home province Munster, before stints abroad with English sides Newcastle Falcons and London Irish. Whilst in England, Nagle also represented Cambridge University, before he returned to Ireland to join Leinster in 2016, as well as joining Ulster on loan during the 2018–19 season. He played in the second row.

== Club career ==
=== Munster ===
Nagle made his Munster debut against Dragons in March 2010. He was on a full contract with Munster, having been promoted from the academy for the 2010–11 season. In November 2010, he was named Man of the Match in Munster's historic win over Australia at Thomond Park. Nagle was part of the Munster A team that won the 2011–12 British and Irish Cup on 27 April 2012. Nagle signed a one-year contract extension with Munster in early April 2013. In April 2014, it was announced that Nagle would be leaving Munster.

=== Loan to Newcastle Falcons ===
It was announced in February 2014 that Nagle would be joining Aviva Premiership side Newcastle Falcons on a short-term loan.

=== London Irish ===
In February 2016, Nagle made his return to professional rugby when he signed with Aviva Premiership side London Irish for the remainder of the 2015–16 season.

=== Leinster ===
On 16 February 2016, it was announced that Nagle will join Leinster for the 2016–17 season.

=== Loan to Ulster ===
Nagle joined Ulster on loan in November 2018, in a deal that saw him remain with the province until the end of the 2018–19 season.

=== Zebre ===
After the completion of his loan to Ulster, Nagle was released by Leinster, and he headed to Italy to join United Rugby Championship side Zebre, where former Munster and Ireland scrum-half Michael Bradley is head coach. Nagle announced his retirement from professional rugby in May 2021.

== International ==
Nagle has represented Ireland at underage, playing for the under-19 and under-20 teams. In January 2011, Nagle won two caps for Ireland Wolfhounds. He played against Scotland A and England Saxons. He was selected to train with the senior Irish national squad for their first week of training for the 2012 Six Nations Championship in January 2012.

Nagle was named in the Emerging Ireland squad to take part in the 2013 IRB Tbilisi Cup on 19 May 2013. He came on as a substitute against Georgia in Emerging Ireland's first game of the tournament on 7 June 2013. Nagle started Emerging Ireland's second game, a 19–8 defeat at the hands of South Africa President's XV on 11 June 2013. He came off the bench against Uruguay on 16 June 2013.
