= Caleb Montgomery =

Irish rugby union player

- Born: Caleb Montgomery; 19 June 1995 (age 31) Portadown, Northern Ireland
- Height: 1.91 m (6 ft 3 in)
- Weight: 103 kg (16 st 3 lb; 227 lb)

Rugby union career
- Position(s): Number 8, Flanker
Amateur team(s)
Years	Team	Apps	(Points)
2017–2019	Banbridge	25	(25)
Senior career
Years	Team	Apps	(Points)
2019	Ulster	1	(0)
2019–2022	Worcester Warriors	3	(0)
2021–2022	→ Cornish Pirates (on loan)	1	(0)
2022–2023	Ampthill	0	(0)

Caleb Montgomery (born 19 June 1995) is an Irish rugby union player, currently playing for English Premiership and European Rugby Champions Cup side Worcester Warriors. He plays as a number 8 or flanker. Montgomery made his Premiership debut v Wasps coming off the bench.

== Early life ==
Born in Portadown, Montgomery plays his club rugby for Banbridge in the All-Ireland League.

== Professional career ==
=== Ulster ===
Montgomery made his senior Ulster debut on 5 January 2019 in round 13 of the 2018–19 Pro14, featuring off the bench in the provinces 40–7 loss against rivals Leinster.

=== Worcester Warriors ===
Montgomery joined English Premiership club Worcester Warriors ahead of the 2019–20 season.
