= 2026–27 Ulster Rugby season =

Ulster Rugby
- 2026–27 season
- Head coach: Richie Murphy
- General manager: Rory Best
- Captain: Iain Henderson
- United Rugby Championship: TBC
- Challenge Cup: TBC
- URC Irish Shield: TBC
- Top try scorer: League: David McCann (4); All: David McCann (5)
- Top points scorer: League: Jack Murphy (34); All: Jack Murphy (34)
- Highest home attendance: 12,814
- Lowest home attendance: 11,705
- Average home attendance: 12,260
Home colours

The 2026–27 season is Ulster Rugby's sixth season in the United Rugby Championship, 26th in all formats of the competition, 33rd since the advent of professionalism, and Richie Murphy's third season as head coach. Along with competing in the URC and its Irish Shield competition, the club also participate in the 2026–27 EPCR Challenge Cup having been beaten finalist in the previous season. James McNabney made his international debut for Ireland this season.

Ulster women finished third in the IRFU Women's Interprovincial Series, losing all three of their round-robin matches before defeating Connacht 29-10 in the third/fourth place playoff. Sophie Barrett made her international debut for Ireland.

== Men's season ==
=== Personnel changes ===
Signings for the 2026–27 season include Benetton's Zimbabwean lock Eli Snyman, Connacht scrum-half Matthew Devine, Irish-qualified lock/back row Ben Donnell from Cardiff, Irish-qualified out-half Jamie Benson from Harlequins, Argentinian prop Eduardo Bello from Newcastle Red Bulls, Irish-qualified South African prop Keynan Knox from Nevers, Connacht wing Chay Mullins, Clontarf centre Daniel Hawkshaw and Exeter Chiefs flanker Martin Moloney. Back row forward Bryn Ward, hooker Henry Walker and wing Aitzol Arenzana-King were promoted from the academy to the senior squad.

Prop Angus Bell returned to the Waratahs after the end of his sabattical. Wing Werner Kok joined Newcastle Red Bulls, out-half James Humphreys joined Ealing Trailfinders, lock Matthew Dalton moved to Kobelco Kobe Steelers, and flanker Lorcan McLoughlin signed for Yakult Levins Toda.. Hooker John Andrew, scrum-half David Shanahan, wing Ben Moxham, props Rory McGuire and Bryan O'Connor, and flankers Marcus Rea and Sean Reffell were released at the end of their contracts. Flanker Josh Stevens, wings Ethan Graham and Lukas Kenny, and centres Sam Berman and Wilhelm de Klerk left the academy. Seven new players joined the academy: props Tyrese Abolarin and Blake McClean, lock Mahon Ronan, scrum-half Connor McVicker, out-half Charlie O'Connor, centre Tom Bell and back three player Jed Findlay.

Ulster synchronised the contracts of their entire senior coaching team: Head coach Richie Murphy, forwards coach Jimmy Duffy, defence coach Willie Faloon and attack coach Mark Sexton all signed new contracts to the end of the 2027–28 season, with development and transition coach Dan Soper already signed until then. However, Duffy left at the end of the 2025–26 season by mutual consent, joining Munster, and Clarke Dermody was recruited from the Highlanders in New Zealand as his replacement. Former Ireland and Australia coach Joe Schmidt joined Ulster's coaching setup as a coach development advisor, and Matt Ireton was appointed head of athletic performance.

Captain Iain Henderson underwent surgery on his hip in the off-season, which will keep him out for several months. Bryn Ward had surgery on his shoulder, Juarno Augustus on his ankle, and Jude Postlethwaite on his knee.

=== Nations Championship Southern Hemisphere Series ===
The 2026 Nations Championship Southern Hemisphere Series ran between 4 and 18 July. The initial Ireland squad included eight Ulster players: prop Tom O'Toole, hooker Tom Stewart, lock/back row Cormac Izuchukwu, flanker Nick Timoney, scrum-half Nathan Doak, centre Stuart McCloskey, and wings Robert Baloucoune and Jacob Stockdale. After Leinster's Caelan Doris and Tommy O'Brien were ruled out through injury, two more Ulstermen, back row forward Bryn Ward and wing Zac Ward, were added to the squad. O'Toole and McCloskey started, and Timoney came off the bench, in a 33–31 win over Australia in Sydney on 4 July. Baloucoune had been selected to start, but had to withdraw with a hamstring injury. In the 36–20 win over Japan in Newcastle, New South Wales, O'Toole, Timoney, McCloskey and Stockdale started, Stewart, Izuchukwu, Bryn Ward and Doak came off the bench, and Timoney, O'Toole and Stewart each scored a try. Finally O'Toole, McCloskey and Baloucoune started, and Timoney appeared from the bench, in a 21–40 defeat by New Zealand.

=== Pre-season friendlies ===
Before the URC season opened, Ulster played two friendlies, the first away to Edinburgh on 4 September, which they won 28-26, the second at home to Ospreys on 11 September, which they won 45-28, with Aitzol Arenzana-King scoring a hat-trick, and Chay Mullins scoring twice.

=== Season first block ===
The first block of the season opened with round one of the URC, at home to Edinburgh on 25 September. With their Ireland internationals rested, Ulster started poorly, going down 5-34. They got back into the game in the second half, finishing 29-34 with two losing bonus points, and David McCann was named player of the match. Four internationals returned for the away match against Glasgow Warriors on 3 October, which finished in a 33-33 draw; Ethan McIlroy was player of the match with one try and two assists. Jacob Stockdale marked his 150th Ulster appearance with two tries in a 26-26 home draw with Munster on 10 October. Hooker Henry Walker scored two tries in his first start as Ulster got their first win of the season, away to Zebre Parma in the Challenge Cup on 17 October. Ulster started their two-week tour to South Africa against the Bulls on 24 October, going down 21-0 before fighting back to lose 34-26, with Chay Mullins scoring twice. They then went down 33-7 to the Stormers on 31 October, finishing the first block without a league win.

=== Nations Championship Northern Hemisphere Series ===
The Northern hemisphere series of the 2026 Nations Championship runs between 6 and 29 November. Nine Ulster players were named in the Ireland squad: Tom O'Toole, Tom Stewart, Nick Timoney, Robert Baloucoune, Nathan Doak, Stuart McCloskey, Jacob Stockdale, and the uncapped James McNabney and Jamie Benson. Timoney, McCloskey and Baloucoune started, and O'Toole came off the bench, in the opening 42-12 victory over Argentina. Injuries in the back row meant David McCann was called up to train with the squad ahead of the match against Fiji on 14 November. Timoney started at number eight, scoring a try, Baloucoune started at right wing, and scored two tries, and Stewart, O'Toole, McCloskey and McNabney came off the bench, McNabney for his international debut, as Ireland won 43-15. McCloskey and Baloucoune started, and Stewart, O'Toole and Timoney, came off the bench, in a 20-17 victory over South Africa on 21 November, with Baloucoune scoring two tries and being named player of the match.

Mark Sexton was appointed head coach of an Ireland XV to take on Fijian Latui in Cork on 20 November. The squad selected for that game includes six Ulster players, Cormac Izuchukwu, David McCann, Matthew Devine, James Hume, Ethan McIlroy and Jack Murphy. McCann and Hume started, and Devine and Murphy came off the bench, with Devine scoring a try and Murphy three conversions, in a 61-12 win. A friendly was arranged between Ulster 'A' and Leinster 'A' at Ravenhill the same day, which Ulster won 26-19.

=== Season continues ===
Ulster return to URC action away to Cardiff on 5 December, followed by round 2 of the Challenge Cup at home to Bayonne on 12 December. Three URC fixtures follow, at home to Ospreys on 18 December, at home to Connacht on 27 December, and away to Leinster on 2 January, before round 3 of the Challenge Cup away to Perpignan on the weekend of 10 January, and round 4 at home to Dragons on 16 January. Two more URC fixtures, at home to the Sharks on 22 January and away to Connacht on 30 January, follow.

The 2027 Six Nations runs between 5 February and 13 March. During the tournament, Ulster play away to Dragons in the URC on 25 February.

The URC season returns on 20 March, with Ulster playing Zebre at home, then away to Benetton on 27 March. The round of 16 of the Challenge Cup, should Ulster qualify, takes place on the weekend of 2-4 April, followed by the quarter-finals on the weekend of 9-11 April. Returning to the URC, Ulster play Scarlets at home on 17 April, and Leinster at home on 23 April. The Challenge Cup semi-finals are on the weekend of 30 April-2 May. The final two URC regular season games are away to Munster on 8 May, and home to the Lions on 14 May. The Challenge Cup final will be on 21 May. The URC quarter finals are on 29 May, the semi-finals on 5 June, and the final on 19 June.

=== Awards ===
Former captain Rory Best was inducted into the Rugby Players Ireland Hall of Fame.

== Women's season ==
The Ulster women's squad for the 2026 IRFU Women's Interprovincial Series was announced by head coach Murray Houston on 28 July 2026. India Daley remained captain, with Abby Moyles and Claire Boles named vice-captains. James Hume joined the coaching team as skills coach, and Reuben Crothers as lineout coach. The series began with a narrow home defeat to Connacht on 8 August, then a 62-0 hammering away to Munster on 15 August, and a 5-75 home walloping against Leinster, but they salvaged something from the series by winning the third/fourth place playoff 29-10 against Connacht in Galway.

Three Ulster players were awarded Irish central contracts: Fiona Tuite, Sadhbh McGrath and the uncapped Sophie Barrett. All three were named in the Ireland training squad for the 2026 WXV Global Series, along with two former Ulster players currently playing in England, Brittany Hogan and Neve Jones. Tuite started, with Jones, McGrath and Hogan coming off the bench, in the 36-40 defeat by the United States at Tallaght Stadium, Dublin, on 20 September. Jones, Tuite and Hogan started, with Hogan scoring two tries, and McGrath came off the bench, in a 31-24 win over Japan at The Sportsground in Galway on 27 September. Jones, Tuite and Hogan started, and McGrath and Barrett came off the bench, Barrett for her international debut, in a non-tournament test against Japan at Musgrave Park, Cork, on 3 October. Hogan, Jones and Barrett each scored a try in a 43-19 win. Tuite, Jones and Hogan were named to start, Jones for her 50th cap, with McGrath on the bench, for the first test against South Africa in Cape Town on 24 October, which Ireland won 40-27. Tuite, Jones and Hogan were again named to start, with Barrett on the bench, for the second test against South Africa on 31 October. Tuite scored a try in a 38-17 win.

== Men's personnel ==
=== Staff ===
Position	Name	Nationality
Chief executive officer	Hugh McCaughey	Ireland
General manager	Rory Best	Ireland
Head coach	Richie Murphy	Ireland
Forwards coach	Clarke Dermody	New Zealand
Backs coach	Mark Sexton	Ireland
Defence and contact skills coach	Willie Faloon	Ireland
Development and transition coach	Dan Soper	New Zealand
Coach development advisor	Joe Schmidt	New Zealand
Head of athletic performance	Matt Ireton	England
Academy manager	Gavin Hogg	Ireland
Elite performance development officer	Niall Annett	Ireland
Elite performance development officer	Jonathon Graham	Ireland

=== Players in ===
- (Zimbabwe) Eli Snyman from (Italy) Benetton
- (Ireland) Matthew Devine from (Ireland) Connacht
- (England) Ben Donnell from (Wales) Cardiff
- (Ireland) Bryn Ward (promoted from Academy)
- (England) Jamie Benson from (England) Harlequins
- (Argentina) Eduardo Bello from (England) Newcastle Red Bulls
- (South Africa) Keynan Knox from (France) Nevers
- (Ireland) Chay Mullins from (Ireland) Connacht
- (Ireland) Henry Walker (promoted from Academy)
- (Ireland) Aitzol Arenzana-King (promoted from Academy)
- (Ireland) Daniel Hawkshaw from (Ireland) Clontarf
- (Ireland) Martin Moloney from (England) Exeter Chiefs

=== Players out ===
- (Australia) Angus Bell to (Australia) NSW Waratahs
- (Ireland) John Andrew (released)
- (Ireland) Ben Moxham (released)
- (Ireland) Rory McGuire (released)
- (Ireland) Bryan O'Connor (released)
- (Ireland) Marcus Rea (released)
- (England) Sean Reffell (released)
- (Ireland) David Shanahan (released)
- (South Africa) Werner Kok to (England) Newcastle Red Bulls
- (Ireland) James Humphreys to (England) Ealing Trailfinders
- (Ireland) Matthew Dalton to (Japan) Kobelco Kobe Steelers
- (Ireland) Lorcan McLoughlin to (Japan) Yakult Levins Toda

=== Senior squad ===
Ulster Rugby squad (Note: Taking into account signings and departures ahead of 2025–26 season as listed on List of 2026–27 United Rugby Championship transfers.)
**Props**: (South Africa) Keynan Knox * (6 apps, 5 starts, 5 pts, 1 (yellow card) ); (Ireland) **Eric O'Sullivan** (6 apps, 4 starts); (Ireland) **Tom O'Toole** (3 apps, 2 starts); (Argentina) **Eduardo Bello** (2 apps, 1 start); (Ireland) Tom McAllister (4 apps); (Ireland) Scott Wilson (3 apps); (Ireland) Sam Crean; (Ireland) Callum Reid; **Hookers**: (Ireland) **Tom Stewart** (4 apps, 3 starts); (England) Henry Walker * (6 apps, 1 start, 10 pts); (Ireland) James McCormick (1 app, 1 start); (Ireland) **Rob Herring** (1 app, 1 start); **Locks**: (Ireland) **Cormac Izuchukwu** (5 apps, 5 starts, 1 (yellow card) ); (Zimbabwe) Eli Snyman (5 apps, 4 starts); (England) Ben Donnell * (5 apps, 4 starts); (Ireland) Harry Sheridan (3 apps, 1 start); (Ireland) Joe Hopes (1 app); (Ireland) **Iain Henderson** (c); (Ireland) Charlie Irvine	**Back row**: (Ireland) David McCann (6 apps, 5 starts, 25 pts); (South Africa) Juarno Augustus (5 apps, 4 starts, 5 pts); (Ireland) James McKillop (4 apps, 2 starts); (Ireland) **Nick Timoney** (2 apps, 2 starts); (Ireland) James McNabney (4 apps, 1 start); (Ireland) Martin Moloney (3 apps, 1 start, 5 pts); (Ireland) **Bryn Ward** (1 app, 1 start, 5 pts); **Scrum-halves**: (Ireland) **Nathan Doak** (4 apps, 3 starts, 8 pts); (Ireland) Matthew Devine (6 apps, 2 starts); (Ireland) Conor McKee (2 apps, 1 start); **Fly-halves**: (Ireland) Jack Murphy (6 apps, 5 starts, 34 pts, 1 (yellow card) ); (England) Jamie Benson * (5 apps, 4 starts, 4 pts); (Ireland) Jake Flannery (5 apps, 1 start)	**Centres**: (Ireland) Ben Carson (3 apps, 3 starts); (Ireland) **Stuart McCloskey** (2 app, 2 start, 10 pts); (Ireland) Daniel Hawkshaw (1 app, 1 start); (Ireland) **James Hume** (1 app, 1 start); (Ireland) Stewart Moore; (Ireland) Jude Postlethwaite; **Wings**: (Ireland) **Jacob Stockdale** (3 apps, 3 starts, 15 pts); (Ireland) **Robert Baloucoune** (3 apps, 3 starts); (Ireland) Zac Ward (4 apps, 3 starts, 5 pts); (Ireland) Chay Mullins (3 apps, 2 start, 15 pts); (Ireland) Aitzol Arenzana-King (1 app, 1 start); **Fullbacks**: (Ireland) **Michael Lowry** (4 app, 3 starts, 10 pts); (Ireland) Ethan McIlroy (3 apps, 3 starts, 5 pts, 1 (yellow card) )
(c) denotes the team captain, **Bold** denotes internationally capped players.^{*} denotes players qualified to play for Ireland on residency or dual nationality. Italics denote academy players. ^{ST} denotes a short-term signing.

=== Academy squad ===
==== Players in ====
- (Ireland) Tyrese Abolarin from (Ireland) Queen's University RFC
- (Ireland) Blake McLean from (Ireland) Instonians
- (Ireland) Connor McVicker from (Ireland) Belfast Royal Academy
- (Ireland) Charlie O’Connor from (Ireland) Royal Belfast Academical Institution
- (Ireland) Tom Bell from (Ireland) Regent House School
- (England) Jed Findlay * from (England) Exeter University RFC
- (Ireland) Mahon Ronan from (Ireland) Leinster Academy

==== Players out ====
- (Ireland) Sam Berman
- (South Africa) Wilhelm de Klerk *
- (Ireland) Ethan Graham
- (Ireland) Lukas Kenny
- (Ireland) Josh Stevens

Ulster Rugby academy squad
**Props**: (Ireland) Tyrese Abolarin **(1)**; (Ireland) Jacob Boyd **(4)**; (Ireland) Flynn Longstaff **(2)**; (Ireland) Tom McAllister **(2)**; (Ireland) Blake McLean **(1)**; **Hookers**: (Ireland) Connor Magee **(2)**; **Locks**: (Ireland) Mahon Ronan **(2)**; (Australia) Paddy Woods * **(2)**	**Back row**: (Ireland) Tom Brigg **(4)**; (Ireland) James McKillop **(3)**; **Scrum-halves**: (Ireland) Clark Logan **(2)**; (Ireland) Connor McVicker **(1)**; **Fly-halves**: (England) Daniel Green * **(2)**; (Ireland) Charlie O’Connor **(1)**	**Centres**: (Ireland) Tom Bell **(1)**; (South Africa) Rynard Gordon * **(2)**; (Ireland) Jonny Scott **(3)**; **Back three**: (England) Jed Findlay * **(1)**; (Ireland) Josh Gibson **(2)**
Number in brackets indicates players stage in the three-year academy cycle.^{*} denotes players qualified to play for Ireland on residency or dual nationality. Players and their allocated positions from the Ulster Rugby website.

== Men's competitions and results ==
=== United Rugby Championship ===
==== League table ====
Pos	Team	Pld	W	D	L	PF	PA	PD	TF	TA	TB	LB	Pts	Qualification
1	Glasgow Warriors	5	4	1	0	148	112	+36	22	15	5	0	23	Qualification for the Champions Cup and knockout stage
2	Bulls	5	4	0	1	214	106	+108	31	15	4	1	21	Qualification for the Champions Cup and knockout stage
3	Stormers	5	4	0	1	166	101	+65	24	14	4	1	21	Qualification for the Champions Cup and knockout stage
4	Sharks	5	4	0	1	140	107	+33	20	16	3	0	19	Qualification for the Champions Cup and knockout stage
5	Edinburgh	5	4	0	1	123	95	+28	17	12	3	0	19	Qualification for the Champions Cup and knockout stage
6	Leinster	5	3	0	2	149	81	+68	23	11	4	2	18	Qualification for the Champions Cup and knockout stage
7	Cardiff	5	3	0	2	113	107	+6	17	17	2	0	14	Qualification for the Champions Cup and knockout stage
8	Dragons	5	2	1	2	137	128	+9	20	20	3	1	14	Qualification for the Champions Cup and knockout stage
9	Ospreys	5	2	0	3	112	147	−35	18	21	3	0	11	Qualification for the Challenge Cup
10	Benetton	5	1	1	3	115	104	+11	16	17	2	3	11	Qualification for the Challenge Cup
11	Connacht	5	2	0	3	109	161	−52	18	24	2	0	10	Qualification for the Challenge Cup
12	Munster	5	1	1	3	93	113	−20	12	17	2	2	10	Qualification for the Challenge Cup
13	Lions	5	2	0	3	107	162	−55	15	25	1	0	9	Qualification for the Challenge Cup
14	Scarlets	5	1	0	4	134	191	−57	20	29	4	1	9	Qualification for the Challenge Cup
15	Ulster	5	0	2	3	121	160	−39	18	22	4	1	9	Qualification for the Challenge Cup
16	Zebre	5	0	0	5	93	199	−106	14	30	2	0	2	Qualification for the Challenge Cup

Updated to match(es) played on 2nd November 2026. Source: UnitedRugby.com
Rules for classification: Tiebreakers for teams tied on points: 1) Number of matches won 2) The difference between points for and points against 3) The number of tries scored 4) The most points scored 5) The difference between tries for and tries against 6) The fewest red cards received 7) The fewest yellow cards received.

==== URC Irish Shield ====
2026–27 United Rugby Championship Regional Shield tables
(Ireland) Irish Shield
	Team	P	W	D	L	PF	PA	PD	TF	TA	TBP	LBP	Pts	Pos overall
1	(Ireland) Leinster	2	2	0	0	74	23	+51	11	3	2	0	10	6
2	(Ireland) Munster	2	0	1	1	44	50	–6	6	8	1	1	4	12
3	(Ireland) Ulster	1	0	1	0	26	26	0	4	4	1	0	3	15
4	(Ireland) Connacht	1	0	0	1	5	50	–45	1	7	0	0	0	11
If teams are level at any stage, tiebreakers are applied in the following order: 1. number of matches won 2. the difference between points for and points against 3. the number of tries scored 4. the most points scored 5. the difference between tries for and tries against 6. the fewest red cards received 7. the fewest yellow cards received
Green background indicates teams currently leading the regional shield. Upon the conclusion of the regular season, these teams win their respective regional shields. (S) : URC Shield champion

==== Fixtures/results ====
25 September 2026	(2 BP) Ulster (Ireland)	29-34	(Scotland) Edinburgh (1 BP)	Ravenhill Stadium, Belfast
	Try: Lowry 26'; Z. Ward 57'; McCann 62'; Knox 64'; Con: Murphy (3) 57' 62' 65'; Pen: Murphy 75'	Report; Match centre	Try: Douglas 20'; Satala 39'; Patterson 43'; O'Conor; Con: Grayson (4) 21' 40' 43' 49'; Pen: Grayson (2) 24' 28'	Referee: Federico Vedovelli
Ulster lineup: 1. Eric O'Sullivan, 2. James McCormick, 3. Eduardo Bello, 4. Eli Snyman, 5. Ben Donnell, 6. David McCann, 7. Martin Moloney, 8. James McNabney, 9. Conor McKee, 10. Jack Murphy, 11. Aitzol Arenzana-King, 12. Jamie Benson, 13. Ben Carson, 14. Robert Baloucoune, 15. Michael Lowry (c).; Replacements: 16. Henry Walker (for McCormick 49'), 17. Tom McAllister (for O'Sullivan 63'), 18. Keynan Knox (for Bello 49'), 19. Harry Sheridan (for Donnell 75'), 19. James McKillop (for McNabney 63'), 21. Matthew Devine (for McKee 44'), 22. Jake Flannery (for Lowry 40'), 23. Zac Ward (for Baloucoune 44', Baloucoune for Arenzana-King 54').				Referee: Federico Vedovelli

3 October 2026	(1 BP) Glasgow Warriors (Scotland)	33-33	(Ireland) Ulster (1 BP)	Scotstoun Stadium, Glasgow
	Try: McKay 10'; Rowe (2) 26' 64'; Dobie 53'; Talakai 60'; Con: Horne (4) 11' 27' 54' 60'; Cards: Lancaster (yellow card) 19'; Darge (yellow card) 71'; Talakai (yellow card) 72'	Report; Match centre	Try: B. Ward 4'; McIlroy 21'; Murphy 40+3'; Mullins 47'; Augustus 73'; Con: Murphy (3) 5' 40+4' 49'; Doak 74'; Cards: Carson (yellow card) 50'; McIlroy (yellow card) 52'	Referee: Christopher Allison
Ulster lineup: 1. Eric O'Sullivan, 2. Tom Stewart (c), 3. Keynan Knox, 4. Cormac Izuchukwu, 5. Eli Snyman, 6. James McKillop, 7. David McCann, 8. Bryn Ward, 9. Matthew Devine, 10. Jack Murphy, 11. Zac Ward, 12. Jamie Benson, 13. Ben Carson, 14. Chay Mullins, 15. Ethan McIlroy.; Replacements: 16. Henry Walker (for Stewart 65'), 17. Tom McAllister (for O'Sullivan 61'), 18. Eduard Bello (for Knox 50'), 19. Ben Donnell (for Izuchukwu 14'-22', 50'), 20. James McNabney (for B. Ward) 40+3'), 21. Nathan Doak (for Devine 47'), 22. Jake Flannery (for Murphy 56'), 23. Juarno Augustus (for McKillop 65').				Referee: Christopher Allison

10 October 2026	(1 BP) Ulster (Ireland)	26-26	(Ireland) Munster (1 BP)	Ravenhill Stadium, Belfast
	Try: Stockdale (2) 12' 53'; McCann 68'; McCloskey 77'; Con: Murphy (3) 54' 69' 78'; Cards: Izuchukwu (yellow card) 30'	Report; Match centre	Try: Kendellen (2) 9' 39'; Van der Merwe 15'; Kelly31' Con: Hanrahan (3) 16' 32' 40'	Referee: Craig Evans
Ulster lineup: 1. Eric O'Sullivan, 2. Tom Stewart (c), 3. Keynan Knox, 4. Ben Donnell, 5. Eli Snyman, 6. Cormac Izuchukwu, 7. Nick Timoney, 8. Juarno Augustus, 9. Nathan Doak, 10. Jack Murphy, 11. Jacob Stockdale, 12. Stuart McCloskey, 13. Jamie Benson, 14. Robert Baloucoune, 15. Ethan McIlroy.; Replacements: 16. Henry Walker (for Stewart 80'), 17. Tom O'Toole (for O'Sullivan 41'), 18. Tom McAllister (for Knox 41'), 19. James McNabney (for Augustus 41'), 20. David McCann (for Snyman 18'), 21. Matthew Devine (for Doak 50'), 22. Jake Flannery, 23. Chay Mullins.				Referee: Craig Evans

24 October 2026	(1 BP) Bulls (South Africa)	34-26	(Ireland) Ulster (1 BP)	Loftus Versfeld, Pretoria
	Try: Coetzee (2) 2' 32'; Louw 18'; Grobbelaar 66'; Con: Pollard (4) 3' 19' 33' 67'; Pen: Pollard 50'; Bosch 80+2'; Cards: Coetzee (yellow card) 46'	ReportMatch centre	Try: Mullins (2) 40+1' 63'; McCann 45'; McCloskey 70'; Con: Murphy (3) 40+1' 46' 71'	Referee: Ru Campbell
Ulster lineup: 1. Tom O'Toole, 2. Tom Stewart (c), 3. Keynan Knox, 4. Ben Donnell, 5. Cormac Izuchukwu, 6. David McCann, 7. Nick Timoney, 8. Juarno Augustus, 9. Nathan Doak, 10. Jack Murphy, 11. Michael Lowry, 12. Stuart McCloskey, 13. Jamie Benson, 14. Chay Mullins, 15. Jacob Stockdale.; Replacements: 16. Henry Walker (for Stuart 74'), 17. Eric O'Sullivan (for O'Toole 65'), 18. Scott Wilson (for Knox 65'), 19. Eli Snyman (for Izuchukwu 56'), 20. James McNabney (for Augustus 65'), 21. Matthew Devine (for Doak 53-68'), 22. Jake Flannery (for Stockdale), 23. James McKillop (for Timoney 65').				Referee: Ru Campbell

31 October 2026	(1 BP) Stormers (South Africa)	33-7	(Ireland) Ulster	Cape Town Stadium
	Try: Schickerling 33'; De Villiers 38'; Roos 46'; Nel 71'; Ahmed 77'; Con: Ahmed (4) 35' 47' 72' 78'	Report; Match centre	Try: McCann 20'; Con: Murphy 21'; Cards: Knox (yellow card) 30'	Referee: Sam Grove-White
Ulster lineup: 1. Eric O'Sullivan, 2. Rob Herring, 3. Keynan Knox, 4. Ben Donnell, 5. Eli Snyman, 6. Cormac Izuchukwu, 7. David McCann, 8. Juarno Augustus, 9. Matthew Devine, 10. Jack Murphy, 11. Zac Ward, 12. Ben Carson, 13. James Hume, 14. Michael Lowry, 15. Ethan McIlroy.; Replacements: 16. Henry Walker (for Herring 56'), 17. Tom McAllister (for O'Sullivan 61'), 18. Scott Wilson (for Ward 37-40', for Knox 58'), 19. Harry Sheridan (for Donnell 41'), 20. Martin Moloney (for Snyman 67'), 21. Conor McKee (for Hume 75'), 22. Jake Flannery (for Mullins 56'), 23. Chay Mullins (for McIlroy 41').				Referee: Sam Grove-White

5 December 2026	Cardiff (Wales)	v	(Ireland) Ulster	Cardiff Arms Park

18 December 2026	Ulster (Ireland)	v	(Wales) Ospreys	Ravenhill Stadium, Belfast

27 December 2026	Ulster (Ireland)	v	(Ireland) Connacht	Ravenhill Stadium, Belfast

2 January 2027	Leinster (Ireland)	v	(Ireland) Ulster	RDS Arena, Dublin

22 January 2027	Ulster (Ireland)	v	(South Africa) Sharks	Ravenhill Stadium, Belfast

30 January 2027	Connacht (Ireland)	v	(Ireland) Ulster	The Sportsground, Galway

26 February 2027	Dragons (Wales)	v	(Ireland) Ulster	Rodney Parade, Newport

20 March 2027	Ulster (Ireland)	v	(Italy) Zebre	Ravenhill Stadium, Belfast

27 March 2027	Benetton (Italy)	v	(Ireland) Ulster	Stadio Monigo, Treviso

17 April 2027	Ulster (Ireland)	v	(Wales) Scarlets	Ravenhill Stadium, Belfast

23 April 2027	Ulster (Ireland)	v	(Ireland) Leinster	Ravenhill Stadium, Belfast

8 May 2027	Munster (Ireland)	v	(Ireland) Ulster	Thomond Park, Limerick

14 May 2027	Ulster (Ireland)	v	(South Africa) Lions	Ravenhill Stadium, Belfast

=== EPCR Challenge Cup ===
Last years beaten finalists, Ulster qualified for the EPCR Challenge Cup having finished outside the top eight of the 2025–26 United Rugby Championship. The pool stage draw took place on 1 July 2026, and Ulster were drawn in Pool 1, alongside the Cheetahs, USA Perpignan, Dragons RFC, Aviron Bayonnais and Zebre Parma.

==== Pool table ====
EPCR Challenge Cup Pool 1
Pos	Team	Pld	W	D	L	PF	PA	PD	TF	TA	TB	LB	Pts	Qualification
1	(Ireland) Ulster	1	1	0	0	40	21	+19	6	3	1	0	5	Home round of 16
2	(Wales) Dragons	1	1	0	0	29	14	+15	4	2	0	0	4	Home round of 16
3	(France) Bayonne	1	1	0	0	29	27	+2	5	3	0	0	4	Home round of 16
4	(South Africa) Cheetahs	1	0	0	1	27	29	−2	3	5	0	1	1	Away round of 16
5	(France) Perpignan	1	0	0	1	14	29	−15	2	4	0	0	0	
6	(Italy) Zebre Parma	1	0	0	1	21	40	−19	3	6	0	0	0	

First match(es) will be played: 16 October 2026. Source: EPCR
Rules for classification: Tiebreakers for teams tied on points: 1) Number of matches won; 2) Difference between points for and against; 3) Total number of points for; 4) Aggregate number of points scored in matches between tied teams; 5) Number of matches won excluding the first match, then the second and so on until the tie is settled.

==== Pool matches ====
17 October 2026	Zebre Parma (Italy)	21-40	(Ireland) Ulster (1 BP)	Stadio Sergio Lanfranchi, Parma
16:15	Try: Licata 43'; Ortombina 63'; Montemauri 72'; Con: Da Re 44'; Montemauri (2) 63' 73'; Cards: Baronio (yellow card) 68'	Report; Match centre	Try: Henry Walker (2) 12' 28'; Stockdale 20'; McCann 47'; Moloney 77'; Con: Doak (3) 13' 29' 48'; Benson (2) 71' 78'; Cards: Murphy (yellow card) 61'
Ulster lineup: 1. Tom O'Toole, 2. Henry Walker, 3. Keynan Knox, 4. Harry Sheridan, 5. Cormac Izuchukwu, 6. James McKillop, 7. David McCann (c), 8. Juarno Augustus, 9. Nathan Doak, 10. Jamie Benson, 11. Zac Ward, 12. Jake Flannery, 13. Daniel Hawkshaw, 14. Robert Baloucoune, 15. Jacob Stockdale, Replacements: 16. Tom Stewart (for Walker 61'), 17. Eric O'Sullivan (for O'Toole 52'), 18. Scott Wilson (for Knox 52'), 19. Joe Hopes (for Sheridan 60'), 20. Martin Moloney (for McCann 61'), 21. Matthew Devine (for Doak 69'), 22. Jack Murphy (for Flannery 60'), 23. Michael Lowry (for Z. Ward 45').

12 December 2026	Ulster	v	(France) Bayonne	Ravenhill Stadium, Belfast
13:00

10 January 2027	Perpignan (France)	v	(Ireland) Ulster	Stade Aimé Giral, Bayonne
14:00

16 January 2027	Ulster (Ireland)	v	(Wales) Dragons	Ravenhill Stadium, Belfast
15:15

=== Friendlies ===
4 September 2026	Edinburgh (Scotland)	26-28	(Ireland) Ulster	The Hive Stadium, Edinburgh
	Try: Gwynn; Patterson; Hill; McAlpine; Con: Grayson (2); Thompson	Report	Try: McCormick; Arenzana-King; Devine; O'Sullivan; Con: Benson (3); Flannery
Ulster lineup: 1. Eric O'Sullivan, 2. James McCormick, 3. Tom McAllister, 4. Harry Sheridan, 5. Joe Hopes, 6. James McKillop, 7. Tom Brigg, 8. David McCann, 9. Matthew Devine, 10. Jamie Benson, 11. Aitzol Arenzana-King, 12. Daniel Hawkshaw, 13. Ben Carson, 14. Chay Mullins, 15. Michael Lowry (c).; Replacements: Henry Walker, Flynn Longstaff, Eduardo Bello, Martin Moloney, Eli Snyman, James McNabney, Ben Donnell, Jed Findlay, Clark Logan, Jack Murphy, Jake Flannery, Jonny Scott

11 September 2026	Ulster (Ireland)	45-25	(Wales) Ospreys	Ravenhill Stadium, Belfast
	Try: Arenzana-King (3); McKee; McCann; Mullins (2); Con: Murphy (4); Flannery	Report	Try: R. Davies; Parry; L. Morgan; Boshoff; Con: Wilde (4)
Ulster lineup: 1. Eric O'Sullivan, 2. James McCormick, 3. Eduardo Bello, 4. Ben Donnell, 5. Eli Snyman, 6. David McCann, 7. Martin Moloney, 8. James McNabney, 9. Conor McKee, 10. Jack Murphy, 11. Aitzol Arenzana-King, 12. Jamie Benson, 13. James Hume, 14. Chay Mullins, 15. Michael Lowry (c).; Replacements: Henry Walker, Tom McAllister, Flynn Longstaff, Harry Sheridan, Joe Hopes, James McKillop, Tom Brigg, Clark Logan, Jake Flannery, Daniel Hawkshaw, Ben Carson.

20 November 2026	Ulster 'A' (Ireland)	26-19	(Ireland) Leinster 'A'	Ravenhill Stadium, Belfast
14:00	Try: Scott; McCormick; Walker; Henry; Con: Flannery (3)	Report	Try: O'Neill; A. Osborne; Smykovskiy; Con: Gabriel (2)
Ulster 'A' lineup: 1. Jacob Boyd, 3. James McCormick, 3. Scott Wilson, 4. Joe Hopes, 5. Herry Sheridan (c), 6. Mahon Ronan, 7. Martin Moloney, 8. Tom Brigg, 9. Conor McKee, 10. Jake Flannery, 11. Josh Gibson, 12. Jonny Scott, 13. Daniel Hawkshaw, 14. Jed Findlay, 15. Dan Green.; Replacements: 16. Henry Walker, 17. Callum Reid, 18. Flynn Longstaff, 19. Jayden Irwin, 20. Rory Woods, 21. Clark Logan, 22. Connor Patton, 23. Aitzol Arenzana-King, 24. Paul Henry.

== Women's personnel ==
=== Staff ===
Position	Name	Nationality
Head coach	Murray Houston	Scotland
Lineout coach	Reuben Crothers	Ireland
Scrum and defence coach	Griffin Phillipson	Ireland
Backs coach	Grace Davitt	Ireland
Skills coach	James Hume	Ireland
Athletic development coach	Kevin Gallagher	Ireland
Team manager	Marianne Breen	Ireland
Physio	Martin Dunlop	Ireland

=== Squad ===
Ulster Senior Women's Squad
**Props**: (Ireland) Sophie Barrett; (Ireland) Bronach Cassidy; (Ireland) Ava Fannin; (Ireland) **Sadhbh McGrath**; (Ireland) Sarah Roberts; (Ireland) Grace Simati; **Hookers**: (Ireland) Maebh Clenaghan; (Ireland) India Daley (c); (Ireland) Emily Whittle; **Locks**: (Ireland) Rebecca Beacom; (Ireland) Olivia McKinley; (Ireland) Ellen Patterson; (Ireland) **Fiona Tuite**	**Back row**: (Ireland) **Claire Boles** (vc); (Ireland) Jemima Johnson; (Ireland) Katie Hetherington; (Ireland) Christy Hill; (Ireland) Moya Hill; (Ireland) Cara McClean; (Ireland) Stacey Sloan; (Ireland) Ruby Starrett; **Scrum-halves**: (Ireland) Georgia Boyce; (Ireland) Amy McConkey; (Ireland) Rachael McIlroy; (Ireland) Sophie Meeke; **Out-halves**: (Ireland) Ella Durkan; (Ireland) Abby Moyles (vc)	**Centres**: (Ireland) Caitlin Crowe; (Ireland) Leah Irwin; (Ireland) Lucy Thompson; **Wings**: (Ireland) Ciara Fitzsimons; (Ireland) Katie Gilmour; (Ireland) Rebecca Mann; **Utility backs**: (Ireland) Niamh Marley; (Ireland) Siobhan Sheerin
(c) denotes the team captain, (vc) denotes the team vice-captain. **Bold** denotes internationally capped players.

== Women's competitions and results ==
=== IRFU Women's Interprovincial Series ===
8 August 2025	Ulster	10-15	Connacht	Ravenhill Stadium, Belfast
	Try: Boles; Barrett	Report	Try: McGann (2); Con: Deely; Pen: Deely
Ulster lineup: 1. Sadhbh McGrath, 2. Maeve Clenaghan, 3. Sophie Barrett, 4. Fiona Tuite, 5. Rebecca Beacom, 6. Moya Hill, 7. Christy Hill, 8. Claire Boles (c), 9. Rachael McIlroy, 10. Abby Moyles, 11. Siobhan Sheerin, 12. Lucy Thompson, 13. Caitlin Crowe, 14. Katie Gilmour, 15. Niamh Marley.; Replacements: 16. Emily Whittle, 17. Sarah Roberts, 18. Ava Fannin, 19. Ellen Patterson, 20. Katie Hetherington, 21. Amy McConkey, 22. Leah Irwin, 23. Ella Durkan

15 August 2025	Munster	62-0	Ulster	Musgrave Park, Cork
	Try: Ugwueru; O’Halloran (2); Buttimer (2); Corrigan; Lane; Corey; McInerney; Murphy; Con: Breen (3); Finn (3)	Report
Ulster lineup: 1. Sadbh McGrath, 2. India Daley (c), 3. Sophie Barrett, 4. Fiona Tuite-O’Sullivan, 5. Rebecca Beacom.; 6. Moya Hill, 7. Christy Hill, 8. Claire Boles, 9. Rachael McIlroy, 10. Abby Moyles, 11. Ciara Fitzsimons, 12. Lucy Thompson, 13. Caitlin Crowe, 14. Katie Gilmour, 15. Niamh Marley.; Replacements: 16. Maebh Clenaghan, 17. Sarah Roberts, 18. Ava Fannin, 19. Olivia McKinley, 20. Stacey Sloan, 21. Georgia Boyce, 22. Leah Irwin, 23. Ella Durkan.

22 August 2025	Ulster	5-75	Leinster	Ravenhill Stadium, Belfast
	Try: McKinney	Report	Try: O'Connor (5); Elmes Kinlan; Whelan (3); Campbell; Gibson; Con: O'Sullivan-Sexton (10)
'Ulster lineup: 1. Sadhbh McGrath, 2. Maebh Clenaghan, 3. Sophie Barrett, 4. Fiona Tuite-O'Sullivan, 5. Olivia McKinney, 6. Moya Hill, 7. Rebecca Beacom, 8. Claire Boles (c), 9. Rachael McIlroy, 10. Ella Durkan, 11. Lucy Thompson, 12. Siobhan Sheerin, 13. Leah Irwin, 14. Caitlin Crowe, 15. Niamh Marley.; Replacements: 16. Emily Whittle, 17. Bronagh Cassidy, 18. Grace Simati, 19. Christy Hill, 20. Stacey Sloan, 21. Georgia Boyce, 22. Katie Gilmour, 23. Abby Moyles.

==== Third/fourth place playoff ====
29 August 2025	Connacht	10-29	Ulster	The Sportsground, Galway
	Try: Heaney; Deely		Try: McKinley; Clenaghan (2); Marley; Sheerin; Con: Moyles (2)
Ulster lineup: 1. Sarah Roberts, 2. Maebh Clenaghan, 3. Sadhbh McGrath, 4. Fiona Tuite-O'Sullivan, 5. Olivia McKinley, 6. Moya Hill, 7. Rebecca Beacom, 8. Claire Boles (c), 9. Rachael McIlroy, 10. Abby Moyles, 11. Niamh Marley, 12. Leah Irwin, 13. Caitlin Crowe, 14. Katie Gilmour, 15. Ella Durkan.; Replacements: 16. Emily Whittle, 17. Sophie Barrett, 18. Ava Fannin, 19. Ellen Patterson, 20. Stacey Sloan, 21. Georgia Boyce, 22. Siobhan Sheerin, 23. Rebecca Mann.
