= 2025–26 Ulster Rugby season =

Ulster Rugby
- 2025–26 season
- Head coach: Richie Murphy
- Chief executive: Hugh McCaughey
- Captain: Iain Henderson
- United Rugby Championship: 9th
- Challenge Cup: Runners-up
- URC Irish Shield: 4th
- Top try scorer: League: Zac Ward (11); All: Zac Ward (15)
- Top points scorer: League: Nathan Doak (102); All: Nathan Doak (135)
- Highest home attendance: 18,196
- Lowest home attendance: 7,169
- Average home attendance: 11,566
| Home colours | Away colours | Third colours |

The 2025–26 season was Ulster's 32nd season since the advent of professionalism in rugby union, and Richie Murphy's second season as head coach of the men's senior team. New signings include South African loose forward Juarno Augustus from Northampton Saints, and Australian international prop Angus Bell. They finished ninth in the United Rugby Championship and runners-up in the EPCR Challenge Cup. Stuart McCloskey was Ulster's Player of the Year, Rugby Players Ireland's Players' Player of the Year, and was named in the URC Elite XV along with wing Werner Kok. Back row Bryn Ward, prop Tom McAllister, centre Jonny Scott, flankers James McKillop and Tom Brigg and wing Aitzol Arenzana-King made their debuts from the academy.

Scrum-half Nathan Doak made his debut for Ireland, with prop Tom O'Toole, hooker Tom Stewart, lock Cormac Izuchukwu, flanker Nick Timoney, wings Jacob Stockdale and Robert Baloucoune, and centre Stuart McCloskey also being capped. McCloskey was nominated for player of the tournament for the 2026 Six Nations Championship, with Baloucoune named the tournament's rising player. Props Scott Wilson and Sam Crean, locks Charlie Irvine and Harry Sheridan, flankers David McCann and Bryn Ward, out-half Jack Murphy, centres Jude Postlethwaite and James Hume, wing Zac Ward, and fullback Michael Lowry appeared for Ireland 'A'.

Ulster Women finished fourth in the IRFU Women's Interprovincial Series. Niamh Marley was player of the year. Four Ulster players, Claire Boles, Brittany Hogan, Sadhbh McGrath and Fiona Tuite, and one former Ulster player, Neve Jones, represented Ireland.

== Sponsorship ==
Ulster's principal sponsor, following the end of their deal with Kingspan, is Antrim-based manufacturing company SAM Mouldings. Following a stadium naming deal, Ravenhill will be known as Affidea Stadium.

== Men's season ==
=== Personnel changes ===
Assistant coach Dan Soper moved from assistant coach to a new transition and development role. Former Connacht attack coach Mark Sexton joined as backs coach. Willie Faloon was defence and contact skills coach. Niall Annett and Jonathon Graham were appointed Elite Player Development Officers. In September, Ulster announced that general manager Bryn Cunningham was to leave his post once a successor had been recruited. Former Ulster and Ireland captain Rory Best was announced as the new general manager on 29 October.

South African loose forward Juarno Augustus joined from Northampton Saints. Three new props signed: tighthead Rory McGuire, from Leinster; Irish-qualified loosehead Sam Crean, who had previous spent some time at Ulster on loan, from Saracens; and Australian international loosehead Angus Bell joined Ulster in December, on sabbatical from the Waratahs. Academy locks Joe Hopes and Charlie Irvine joined the senior squad on development deals, to become senior deals in 2026, and out-half James Humphreys moved from a development contract to a senior one, as did prop Scott Wilson and back rowers James McNabney and Lorcan McLoughlin, while academy out-half Jack Murphy was upgraded to a senior contract. Six players joined the academy: hooker Connor Magee, props Tom McAllister and Flynn Longstaff, out-half Daniel Green, and wings Josh Gibson and Aitzol Arenzana-King.

Lock Kieran Treadwell left to join Harlequins. Scrum-half John Cooney joined French club Brive. Flanker Reuben Crothers retired. Lock Alan O'Connor left to become head of rugby development at Ballymena Academy. Prop Andrew Warwick retired from professional rugby and returned to Ballymena RFC; Prop Corrie Barrett, flanker Matty Rea and scrum-half Michael McDonald were released, along with academy players Rory Telfer, Zac Solomon, Jack Boal and Ben McFarlane. Academy prop Cameron Doak joined the Harlequins academy. Out-half Aidan Morgan left by mutual consent, and signed for Toyota Verblitz. In November, centre Stewart Moore joined Newcastle Falcons on loan, but was soon recalled to cover for injuries.

Two Irish-qualified 18-year-olds, Australian-born lock Paddy Woods and South-African-born centre Rynard Gordon, joined the Ulster academy in February.

Davy Haslett, Ulster's head coach in the 1997–98 season, died in June 2026.

=== Summer internationals ===
Seven Ulster players, lock Cormac Izuchukwu, prop Tom O'Toole, hooker Tom Stewart, flanker Nick Timoney, centre Stuart McCloskey, scrum-half Nathan Doak and wing Jacob Stockdale, were named in the Ireland men's squad for the summer tour to Georgia and Portugal. Three more players, flanker James McNabney, centre Jude Postlethwaite and wing Zac Ward, were called up as training panellists, and prop Scott Wilson was called up as injury cover. McNabney sustained an anterior cruciate ligament injury in training.

Izuchukwu, Timoney, Stockdale and McCloskey started against Georgia on 5 July, with Stewart appearing from the bench. Timoney scored a try in a 34–5 victory, but Stockdale was taken off with an arm injury. McCloskey started, and scored a try, with Stewart, O'Toole and Izuchukwu coming off the bench in a 106–7 victory against Portugal on 12 July.

=== Domestic season: first block ===
Ulster opened their URC season with a home bonus point win against Dragons on 26 September. Their second round away match against Edinburgh was postponed due to Storm Amy. A second home bonus point win followed against the Bulls. A 30-man squad for the two-match mini-tour to South Africa to play the Sharks and Lions was announced on 15 October. They beat the Sharks with a four-try bonus point on 18 October. Four players, including academy back row Bryn Ward, were added to the squad to cover injuries and international callups. Ward made his debut, and Robert Baloucoune scored three tries, but the Lions won 49–31.

=== Autumn internationals ===
Four Ulster players, Iain Henderson, Nick Timoney, Stuart McCloskey and Jacob Stockdale, were named in the Ireland squad for the 2025 end-of-year rugby union internationals. McCloskey started, and Henderson appeared from the bench, in the loss to New Zealand in Chicago. Stockdale and Timoney started, and Timoney scored a try, in the home win against Japan. McCloskey started and Timoney appeared from the bench in the home win over Australia. No Ulster players appeared in the home defeat to South Africa.

Ten Ulster players, Tom Stewart (named as captain), Tom O'Toole, Scott Wilson, David McCann, Nathan Doak, Jack Murphy, Jude Postlethwaite, Zac Ward, Robert Baloucoune and Michael Lowry, were named in the Ireland 'A' squad to face Spain on 8 November. Jimmy Duffy was named as forwards coach. Stewart, O'Toole, Postlethwaite, Baloucoune and Lowry started, and Wilson, McCann, Doak and Ward appeared from the bench, in the 61–24 away win, with Baloucoune scoring two tries, and Postlethwaite and Wilson scoring one each.

=== Domestic season: second block ===
Ulster returned to the URC on 28 November 2025 with a 47-13 home win over Benetton, including two tries each for Robert Baloucoune and Werner Kok. They then opened their Challenge Cup campaign with a 61-7 home win over Racing 92, including two tries each for Jacob Stockdale and Zac Ward. They sent a rotated team to Cardiff for their second Challenge Cup pool match, losing 26-29 to a last-minute penalty from Callum Sheedy.

There followed a season of interpros in the URC. Ulster lost 24-20 away to Leinster in the URC, despite two Werner Kok tries, but returned to winning ways the following week, defeating Connacht 29-24 in Galway, with Zac Ward scoring two tries. On 2 January 2026, Ulster defeated Munster 28-3 at home, with academy back row forward Bryn Ward, starting at number eight in the absence of the injured Juarno Augustus, was named player of the match.

Their third Challenge Cup pool match was scheduled for 11 January, against the Cheetahs at the NRCA Stadium in Amsterdam. Due to weather conditions, it was moved to Dukes Rugby in 's-Hertogenbosch, but was called off at the last minute after more snow and sub-zero conditions left the pitch unplayable. The match was cancelled by EPCR, and Ulster were awarded a 28-0 win, which guaranteed qualification for the round of 16. A home victory against Stade Français Paris meant Ulster finished top of the group and third seed overall, earning a home game in the round of sixteen against Ospreys on 4 April. A last-minute away loss to the Scarlets and a home win over Cardiff left Ulster fourth in thye URC table after round 11.

=== Six Nations break ===
Nine Ulster players were selected in the Ireland squad for the 2026 Six Nations Championship: hooker Tom Stewart, prop Tom O'Toole, lock Cormac Izuchukwu, flanker Nick Timoney, wings Jacob Stockdale and Robert Baloucoune, centres Stuart McCloskey and Jude Postlethwaite, and uncapped scrum-half Nathan Doak. Loose forward Bryn Ward was called up as a training panellist, and was in the squad for the Ireland 'A' squad for the fixture against England 'A', alongside props Sam Crean and Scott Wilson, locks Charlie Irvine and Harry Sheridan, centre James Hume, out-half Jack Murphy, and wing Zac Ward, with Mark Sexton involved as attack coach.

McCloskey and Stockdale started, and Timoney came off the bench and scored a try, in the opening away loss against France. Wilson, Irvine, Bryn Ward, Zac Ward and Hume started the 'A' international, and Crean, Sheridan and Murphy appeared from the bench, as they lost 52-14 to England 'A'. Bryn Ward returned to the full Ireland squad. Izuchukwu, McCloskey and Baloucoune were named to start, with O'Toole and Timoney on the bench, for the second Six Nations game at home to Italy. Baloucoune scored a try and was named Man of the Match in a 20-13 win. The following week McCloskey and Baloucoune started, with Baloucoune scoring a try, and O'Toole and Timoney came off the bench, in a 42-21 away win against England.

In the Six Nations break week, Ulster lost 21-10 away to the Ospreys. The following week, Tom O'Toole, Nick Timoney, Jacob Stockdale, Stuart McCloskey and Robert Baloucoune started, Stockdale scoring a try, and Tom Stewart and Nathan Doak came off the bench, the latter making his international debut, as Ireland beat Wales 27-17 in Dublin. The postponed round 2 URC match between Edinburgh and Ulster was rescheduled for 13 March 2026. Academy prop Tom McAllister made his senior debut as Ulster won 40-19 and went into second in the URC table. In the final round of the Six Nations, Tom O'Toole, Stuart McCloskey and Robert Baloucoune started, with Baloucoune scoring a try, and Timoney came off the bench, as Ireland won the Triple Crown with a home win against Scotland. Baloucoune won the tournament's Rising Player award.

=== Domestic season: final block ===
Ulster lost their home interpro against Connacht, with academy centre Jonny Scott making his debut from the bench. James Humphreys made his first start the following week, as Ulster defeated Zebre Parma away, with a four-try bonus point returning them to third in the table. Ulster hosted the Ospreys in the round of 16 of the Challenge Cup, and won 28-24, with what would have been a last-minute winning try by the Ospreys disallowed for a forward pass.

Ulster then lost two interpros in the URC: the first, 21-29 at home to Leinster, in which six players went off injured, and the second, a heavily rotated side lost 14-41 away to Munster. Three academy players, flankers James McKillop and Tom Brigg, and wing Aitzol Arenzana-King, who scored a try, made their senior debuts. These two defeats left Ulster in eighth position in the table, with nine teams capable of qualifying for the eight playoff places. They won their home semi-final in the Challenge Cup against Exeter Chiefs, setting up a final in Bilbao against Montpellier. They closed out the URC season with a home draw against the Stormers and a home loss to Glasgow Warriors, finishing in ninth, just outside the playoff positions, and lost the Challenge Cup final 26-59, failing to qualify for next season's Champions Cup.

== Women's season ==
The Ulster women's squad was announced in May 2025. Murray Houston remained head coach. Hooker India Daley was named captain, and lock Brenda Barr vice-captain.

Four Ulster players were named in the Ireland preparation squad for the 2025 Women's Rugby World Cup: hooker Neve Jones, now at Gloucester-Hartpury, back row Brittany Hogan, prop Sadhbh McGrath and lock Fiona Tuite. McGrath and Hogan were named to start the first warm-up match against Scotland on 2 August, with Jones and Tuite on the bench. McGrath scored a try in a 27–21 victory. Jones, Tuite and Hogan were named to start, with McGrath and Claire Boles on the bench, for the second warm-up match against Canada on 9 August, which Ireland lost 26–47.

The IRFU Women's Interprovincial Series was held between 10 and 30 August. Ulster, without their international players, finished fourth, losing all their round-robins matches, and were defeated 27-30 by Connacht in the third/fourth place final.

Boles, Hogan, Jones, McGrath and Tuite were all named in the World Cup squad. Hogan, Tuite and Jones started the opening 42–14 victory over Japan, with McGrath coming off the bench; Jones and Tuite both scored tries. Boles and Tuite started the 43–27 victory over Spain, with Jones, McGrath and Hogan coming off the bench. Hogan and Jones started the final pool match, a 40–0 defeat to New Zealand, and McGrath and Boles came off the bench. Ireland qualified for the quarter-final, which they lost 13–18 to France. Jones, Tuite and Hogan started, and McGrath came off the bench.

Tuite, McGrath and Kate Farrell McCabe were awarded IRFU central contracts. Hogan, who had moved to Sale Sharks, Tuite and McGrath were selected for the 2026 Women's Six Nations Championship.

Ulster players selected for the Wolfhounds for the 2025-26 Celtic Challenge were Sophie Barrett, Claire Boles, Maebh Clenaghan, India Daley, Cara McLean, Fiona Tuite, Niamh Marley and Kate Farrell McCabe. Sadhbh McGrath was selected for the Clovers. The Wolfhounds finished top of the table, and the Clovers finished second. The Wolfhounds defeated Brython Thunder and the Clovers beat Gwalia Lightning in the semi-finals, and the Wolfhounds defeated the Clovers 50–29 in the final.

== Awards ==
=== Rugby Players Ireland Awards ===
The Rugby Players Ireland awards were held in the Clayton Hotel in Dublin on 20 May 2026. Stuart McCloskey was named Men's 15s Player of the Year, Bryn Ward won the Nevin Spence Young Player of the Year award, and Robert Baloucoune won Men's 15s Try of the Year for his score for Ireland against Italy in the Six Nations. Brittany Hogan was nominated for Women's 15s Player of the Year.

=== Ulster Rugby Awards ===
The 2026 Ulster Rugby Awards Dinner was held at the Crowne Plaza Hotel in Belfast on 27 May 2026. Winners were:

==== Men's and boys' awards ====
- Personality of the Year: John Andrew
- Men's Player of the Year: Stuart McCloskey
- Young Men's Player of the Year: Jack Murphy
- Supporters' Club Player of the Year: Stuart McCloskey
- Rugby Writers' Player of the Year: Werner Kok
- Club Player of the Year: Bradley McNamara, Instonians
- Boys' Schools Player of the Year: Charlie O'Connor, RBAI
- Boys' Youth Player of the Year: Ayrton Pienaar, Virginia RFC

==== Women's and girls' awards ====
- Women's Player of the Year: Niamh Marley, Cooke RFC
- Young Women's Player of the Year: Moya Hill, Enniskillen RFC
- Girls' Schools Player of the Year: Méabh Hull, Down High School
- Girls' Youth Player of the Year: Caitlin Crowe, Virginia RFC

==== Club/community awards ====
- Club of the Year: Enniskillen RFC
- Dorrington B. Faulker Award (Services to Rugby): Richard Clingan, Royal School Dungannon
- Ulster Rugby Foundation Award: Newforge Taggers RFC
- Referee of the Year: Ross Whitfield

=== URC awards ===
Centre Stuart McCloskey and wing Werner Kok were named in the URC's Elite XV. Angus Bell's try against Cardiff won the Try of the Season award.

== Men's personnel ==
=== Staff ===
| Position | Name | Nationality |
|---|---|---|
| Chief executive officer | Hugh McCaughey | Ireland |
| General manager | Rory Best | Ireland |
| Head coach | Richie Murphy | Ireland |
| Forwards coach | Jimmy Duffy | Ireland |
| Backs coach | Mark Sexton | Ireland |
| Defence and contact skills coach | Willie Faloon | Ireland |
| Development and transition coach | Dan Soper | New Zealand |
| Academy manager | Gavin Hogg | Ireland |
| Elite performance development officer | Niall Annett | Ireland |
| Elite performance development officer | Jonathon Graham | Ireland |

=== Senior squad ===
The below squad reflects the confirmed joiners and leavers for the 2025–26 season. Amendments to the squad will be made as-and-when announcements are confirmed by the province.

==== Players in ====
- (South Africa) Juarno Augustus from (England) Northampton Saints
- (Australia) Angus Bell from (Australia) Waratahs
- (England) Sam Crean from (England) Saracens
- (Ireland) Rory McGuire from (Ireland) Leinster
- (Ireland) Bradley McNamara from (Ireland) Instonians short term injury cover

==== Promoted from academy ====
- (Ireland) Joe Hopes
- (Ireland) Charlie Irvine
- (Ireland) Jack Murphy

==== Players out ====
- (Ireland) Corrie Barrett released
- (Ireland) John Cooney to (France) Brive
- (Ireland) Reuben Crothers retired
- (New Zealand) Aidan Morgan to (Japan) Toyota Verblitz
- (Ireland) Michael McDonald released
- (Ireland) Alan O'Connor released
- (Ireland) Matty Rea released
- (Ireland) Kieran Treadwell to (England) Harlequins
- (Ireland) Andrew Warwick to (Ireland) Ballymena
- (Ireland) Stewart Moore to (England) Newcastle Red Bulls (loan)

Ulster Rugby squad (Note: Taking into account signings and departures ahead of 2025–26 season as listed on List of 2025–26 United Rugby Championship transfers.)
| **Props**: (Ireland) **Tom O'Toole** (19 apps, 15 starts, 15 pts, 1 (yellow card) ); (Australia) **Angus Bell** (17 apps, 11 starts, 10 pts); (England) Sam Crean* (18 apps, 10 starts); (Ireland) Scott Wilson (22 apps, 7 starts, 20 pts, 1 (yellow card) ); (Ireland) **Eric O'Sullivan** (10 apps, 3 starts, 5 pts); (Ireland) Tom McAllister (5 apps, 2 starts, 5 pts); (Ireland) Callum Reid (5 apps, 1 start, 5 pts); (Ireland) Bryan O'Connor (3 apps, 1 start); (Ireland) Rory McGuire (1 app); **Hookers**: (Ireland) **Tom Stewart** (21 apps, 15 starts, 45 pts); (Ireland) **Rob Herring** (16 apps, 9 starts, 15 pts, 1 (yellow card) ); (Ireland) James McCormick (9 apps, 2 start, 5 pts); (Ireland) John Andrew (4 apps, 5 pts); **Locks**: (Ireland) **Iain Henderson** (c) (15 apps, 15 starts, 1 (red card) ); (Ireland) Harry Sheridan (20 apps, 14 starts, 5 pts, 1 (yellow card) , 1 (red card) ); (Ireland) **Cormac Izuchukwu** (13 apps, 11 starts, 25 pts); (Ireland) Charlie Irvine (13 apps, 9 starts, 10 pts); (Ireland) Joe Hopes (12 apps, 6 starts); (Ireland) Matthew Dalton (9 apps, 3 starts) | **Back row**: (Ireland) David McCann (22 apps, 20 starts, 20 pts, 1 (yellow card) ); (Ireland) **Nick Timoney** (17 apps, 17 starts, 15 pts); (South Africa) Juarno Augustus (16 apps, 14 starts, 15 pts); (Ireland) Bryn Ward (20 apps, 9 starts, 20 pts); (England) Sean Reffell* (5 apps, 2 starts); (Ireland) Marcus Rea (5 apps, 2 starts, 1 (yellow card) ); (Ireland) Lorcan McLoughlin (3 apps, 1 start); (Ireland) James McKillop (1 app, 1 start); (Ireland) Tom Brigg (1 app, 1 start, 1 (yellow card) ); (Ireland) James McNabney; **Scrum-halves**: (Ireland) Nathan Doak (21 apps, 18 starts, 135 pts, 1 (yellow card) ); (Ireland) Conor McKee (20 apps, 6 starts, 5 pts); (Ireland) David Shanahan (5 apps, 1 start); **Fly-halves**: (Ireland) Jack Murphy (22 apps, 20 starts, 57 pts, 2 (yellow card) ); (Ireland) Jake Flannery (20 apps, 4 starts, 38 pts); (Ireland) James Humphreys (3 apps, 1 start, 4 pts) | **Centres**: (Ireland) **James Hume** (20 apps, 20 starts, 15 pts); (Ireland) **Stuart McCloskey** (13 apps, 13 starts, 10 pts, 1 (yellow card) ); (Ireland) Jude Postlethwaite (17 apps, 9 starts); (Ireland) Ben Carson (8 apps, 4 starts, 5 pts, 1 (yellow card) ); (Ireland) Stewart Moore (3 apps, 1 start); (South Africa) Wilhelm de Klerk* (1 app, 1 start); (Ireland) Jonny Scott (2 apps); **Wings**: (Ireland) Zac Ward (20 apps, 20 starts, 75 pts, 2 (yellow card) ); (South Africa) Werner Kok (18 apps, 17 starts, 60 pts, 1 (yellow card) ); (Ireland) **Jacob Stockdale** (14 apps, 14 starts, 15 pts, 1 (yellow card) ); (Ireland) **Robert Baloucoune** (8 apps, 8 starts, 35 pts); (Ireland) Ben Moxham (2 apps, 1 start); (Ireland) Aitzol Arenzana-King (1 app, 1 start, 5 pts); **Fullbacks**: (Ireland) **Michael Lowry** (12 apps, 12 starts, 15 pts); (Ireland) Ethan McIlroy (10 apps, 5 starts, 5 pts); (Ireland) Bradley McNamara ^{ST} (1 app) |
(c) denotes the team captain, **Bold** denotes internationally capped players.^{*} denotes players qualified to play for Ireland on residency or dual nationality. Italics denote academy players. ^{ST} denotes a short-term signing.

=== Academy squad ===
==== Players in ====
- (Ireland) Aitzol Arenzana-King from (Ireland) Leinster academy
- (Ireland) Josh Gibson from (Ireland) Banbridge
- (England) Daniel Green* from Queen's University
- (Ireland) Flynn Longstaff from (Ireland) Queen's University
- (Ireland) Connor Magee from (Ireland) Banbridge
- (Ireland) Tom McAllister from (Ireland) Ballynahinch
- (Australia) Paddy Woods* from (Ireland) Queen's University
- (South Africa) Rynard Gordon* from (South Africa) Bishops Rugby

==== Players out ====
- (Ireland) Jack Boal to (England) Cambridge R.U.F.C.
- (Ireland) Cameron Doak to (England) Harlequins academy
- (Ireland) Ben McFarlane
- (Ireland) Zac Solomon
- (Ireland) Rory Telfer

Ulster Rugby academy squad
| **Props**: (Ireland) Jacob Boyd **(3)**; (Ireland) Flynn Longstaff **(1)**; (Ireland) Tom McAllister **(1)**; **Hookers**: (Ireland) Connor Magee **(1)**; (England) Henry Walker* **(3)**; **Locks**: (Australia) Paddy Woods* **(1)** | **Back row**: (Ireland) Tom Brigg **(3)**; (Ireland) James McKillop **(2)**; (Ireland) Josh Stevens **(3)**; (Ireland) Bryn Ward **(2)**; **Scrum-halves**: (Ireland) Clark Logan **(2)**; **Fly-halves**: (England) Daniel Green* **(1)** | **Centres**: (Ireland) Sam Berman **(2)**; (South Africa) Wilhelm de Klerk* **(2)**; (South Africa) Rynard Gordon* **(1)**; (Ireland) Jonny Scott **(2)**; **Back three**: (Ireland) Aitzol Arenzana-King **(3)**; (Ireland) Josh Gibson **(1)**; (Ireland) Ethan Graham **(3)**; (Ireland) Lukas Kenny **(3)** |
Number in brackets indicates players stage in the three-year academy cycle.^{*} denotes players qualified to play for Ireland on residency or dual nationality. Players and their allocated positions from the Ulster Rugby website.

== Men's competitions and results ==
=== Season record ===
| Competition | Played | Won | Drawn | Lost | PF | PA | PD | TF | TA |
|---|---|---|---|---|---|---|---|---|---|
| 2025–26 Challenge Cup | 7 (Note: Not including the pool match against the Cheetahs, which was not played and was awarded as a 28-0 win to Ulster.) | 5 | 0 | 2 | 237 | 174 | +63 | 35 | 25 |
| 2025–26 URC | 18 | 9 | 1 | 8 | 494 | 420 | +74 | 72 | 60 |
| Total | 25 | 14 | 1 | 9 | 731 | 594 | +137 | 107 | 85 |

=== Home attendance ===
After URC round 13, Challenge Cup semi-final

| United Rugby Championship | | | | | | European Challenge Cup | | | | | | Total | | |
| Competition | Fixtures | Attendance | | | | Competition | Fixtures | Attendance | | | | Total | | |
| Competition | Fixtures | Total | Average | Highest | Lowest | Competition | Fixtures | Total | Average | Highest | Lowest | Fixtures | Total attendance | Average attendance |
| 2025–26 United Rugby Championship | 9 | 113,451 | 12,606 | 18,196 | 9,563 | 2025–26 EPCR Challenge Cup | 5 | 48,479 | 9,696 | 11,900 | 7,169 | 14 | 161,930 | 11,566 |

=== United Rugby Championship ===
==== Table ====
| Pos | Team | Pld | W | D | L | PF | PA | PD | TF | TA | TB | LB | Pts | Qualification |
|---|---|---|---|---|---|---|---|---|---|---|---|---|---|---|
| 1 | Glasgow Warriors | 18 | 13 | 0 | 5 | 479 | 338 | +141 | 72 | 48 | 11 | 2 | 65 | Qualification for the Champions Cup and knockout stage |
| 2 | Leinster (CH) | 18 | 12 | 0 | 6 | 515 | 370 | +145 | 77 | 51 | 13 | 2 | 63 | Qualification for the Champions Cup and knockout stage |
| 3 | Stormers | 18 | 12 | 1 | 5 | 504 | 344 | +160 | 63 | 48 | 9 | 1 | 60 | Qualification for the Champions Cup and knockout stage |
| 4 | Bulls (RU) | 18 | 12 | 0 | 6 | 576 | 406 | +170 | 82 | 59 | 10 | 1 | 59 | Qualification for the Champions Cup and knockout stage |
| 5 | Munster | 18 | 11 | 0 | 7 | 396 | 376 | +20 | 59 | 51 | 8 | 3 | 55 | Qualification for the Champions Cup and knockout stage |
| 6 | Cardiff | 18 | 11 | 0 | 7 | 353 | 372 | −19 | 52 | 52 | 7 | 4 | 55 | Qualification for the Champions Cup and knockout stage |
| 7 | Lions | 18 | 10 | 1 | 7 | 532 | 473 | +59 | 73 | 70 | 9 | 3 | 54 | Qualification for the Champions Cup and knockout stage |
| 8 | Connacht | 18 | 10 | 0 | 8 | 442 | 395 | +47 | 62 | 56 | 10 | 4 | 54 | Qualification for the Champions Cup and knockout stage |
| 9 | Ulster | 18 | 9 | 1 | 8 | 494 | 420 | +74 | 72 | 60 | 10 | 4 | 52 | Qualification for the Challenge Cup |
| 10 | Sharks | 18 | 8 | 1 | 9 | 467 | 428 | +39 | 71 | 57 | 9 | 3 | 46 | Qualification for the Challenge Cup |
| 11 | Ospreys | 18 | 7 | 2 | 9 | 376 | 454 | −78 | 55 | 69 | 4 | 3 | 39 | Qualification for the Challenge Cup |
| 12 | Edinburgh | 18 | 7 | 0 | 11 | 362 | 439 | −77 | 57 | 66 | 6 | 4 | 38 | Qualification for the Challenge Cup |
| 13 | Benetton | 18 | 6 | 2 | 10 | 327 | 493 | −166 | 41 | 71 | 4 | 1 | 33 | Qualification for the Challenge Cup |
| 14 | Scarlets | 18 | 4 | 2 | 12 | 361 | 460 | −99 | 52 | 63 | 3 | 5 | 28 | Qualification for the Challenge Cup |
| 15 | Dragons | 18 | 3 | 4 | 11 | 350 | 481 | −131 | 46 | 71 | 4 | 4 | 28 | Qualification for the Challenge Cup |
| 16 | Zebre | 18 | 2 | 0 | 16 | 312 | 587 | −275 | 43 | 85 | 3 | 4 | 15 | Qualification for the Challenge Cup |

Updated to match(es) played on 16 May 2026. Source: UnitedRugby.com
Rules for classification: Tiebreakers for teams tied on points: 1) Number of matches won 2) The difference between points for and points against 3) The number of tries scored 4) The most points scored 5) The difference between tries for and tries against 6) The fewest red cards received 7) The fewest yellow cards received.

==== URC Irish Shield ====
2025–26 United Rugby Championship Regional Shield tables
(Ireland) Irish Shield
| | Team | P | W | D | L | PF | PA | PD | TF | TA | TBP | LBP | Pts | Pos overall |
| 1 | (Ireland) Leinster (S) | 6 | 5 | 0 | 1 | 166 | 120 | +46 | 23 | 15 | 4 | 0 | 24 | 2 |
| 2 | (Ireland) Munster | 6 | 3 | 0 | 3 | 126 | 91 | +35 | 16 | 15 | 2 | 1 | 15 | 5 |
| 3 | (Ireland) Connacht | 6 | 2 | 0 | 4 | 131 | 157 | –27 | 18 | 21 | 2 | 2 | 12 | 8 |
| 4 | (Ireland) Ulster | 6 | 2 | 0 | 4 | 131 | 147 | –16 | 18 | 22 | 1 | 2 | 11 | 9 |
If teams are level at any stage, tiebreakers are applied in the following order: 1. number of matches won 2. the difference between points for and points against 3. the number of tries scored 4. the most points scored 5. the difference between tries for and tries against 6. the fewest red cards received 7. the fewest yellow cards received
Green background indicates teams currently leading the regional shield. Upon the conclusion of the regular season, these teams win their respective regional shields. (S) : URC Shield champion

==== Results ====
| 26 September 2025 | (1 BP) Ulster (Ireland) | 42–21 | (Wales) Dragons | Ravenhill Stadium, Belfast |
| 20:05 | Try: Izuchukwu 12'; Timoney 28'; McCann 34'; Z. Ward 36'; Doak 42'; Stewart 80+3'; Con: Doak (5) 13', 29', 34', 38', 43'; Flannery 80+4' | Report; Match centre | Try: Wainwright 0'; Rosser 16'; Lewis-Hughes 49'; Con: De Beer (3) 2', 17', 50' | Attendance: 9,563; Referee: Griffin Colby (South Africa) |
| Ulster: 1. Callum Reid, 2. Rob Herring, 3. Tom O'Toole, 4. Iain Henderson (c), 5. Harry Sheridan, 6. Cormac Izuchukwu, 7. Nick Timoney, 8. David McCann, 9. Nathan Doak, 10. Jack Murphy, 11. Jacob Stockdale, 12. Stuart McCloskey, 13. James Hume, 14. Zac Ward, 15. Michael Lowry.; Replacements: 16. Tom Stewart (for Herring 57'), 17. Sam Crean (for Reid 53'), 18. Scott Wilson (for O'Toole 53'), 19. Matty Dalton (for Henderson 62'), 20. Juarno Augustus (for McCann 57'), 21. Conor McKee (for Doak 70'), 22. Jake Flannery (for Murphy 70'), 23. Ben Carson (for McCloskey 62'). | | | | Attendance: 9,563; Referee: Griffin Colby (South Africa) |

| 11 October 2025 | (1 BP) Ulster (Ireland) | 28–7 | (South Africa) Bulls | Ravenhill Stadium, Belfast |
| 19:45 | Try: McCloskey 22'; Augustus 49'; Herring 54'; Izuchukwu 57'; Con: Doak (4) 22', 50', 55', 58'; Cards: Herring (yellow card) 27' | Report; Match centre | Try: Louw 27'; Con: Pollard 28'; Cards: Rudolph (yellow card) 47' | Attendance: 10,629; Referee: Mike Adamson (Scotland) |
| Ulster: 1. Sam Crean, 2. Rob Herring, 3. Tom O'Toole, 4. Iain Henderson (c), 5. Cormac Izuchukwu, 6. David McCann, 7. Nick Timoney, 8. Juarno Augustus, 9. Nathan Doak, 10. Jack Murphy, 11. Zac Ward, 12. Stuart McCloskey, 13. James Hume, 14. Robert Baloucoune, 15. Jacob Stockdale.; Replacements: 16. Tom Stewart (for Baloucoune 34–37', for Herring 58'), 17. Eric O'Sullivan (for Crean 64'), 18. Scott Wilson (for O'Toole 51'), 19. Harry Sheridan (for Izuchukwu 63'), 20. Sean Reffell (for Augustus 61'), 21. Conor McKee (for Doak 75'), 22. Jake Flannery (for Murphy 71'), 23. Jude Postlethwaite (for McCloskey 32–33', 69'). | | | | Attendance: 10,629; Referee: Mike Adamson (Scotland) |

| 18 October 2025 | (1 BP) Sharks (South Africa) | 26–34 | (Ireland) Ulster (1 BP) | Kings Park Stadium, Durban |
| 15:00 | Try: Kolisi 33'; Mapimpi 49'; Esterhuizen 71'; Penalty try Con: Masuku 50'; Hendrikse 72'; Cards: Mapimpi (red card); Koch (yellow card) 51' | Report; March centre | Try: Lowry 6'; Werner Kok 21'; Stewart 56'; Reid 66'; Con: Doak (4) 7', 21', 57', 68'; Pen: Doak (2) 16', 37'; Cards: O'Toole (yellow card) 61' | Attendance: 11,280; Referee: Ben Whitehouse |
| Ulster: 1. Sam Crean, 2. Tom Stewart, 3. Scott Wilson, 4. Iain Henderson (c), 5. Harry Sheridan, 6. David McCann, 7. Nick Timoney, 8. Juarno Augustus, 9. Nathan Doak, 10. Jack Murphy, 11. Jacob Stockdale, 12. Stuart McCloskey, 13. James Hume, 14. Werner Kok, 15. Michael Lowry.; Replacements: 16. Rob Herring (for Reffell 46'), 17. Callum Reid (for Crean 51'), 18. Tom O'Toole (for Wilson 46', Wilson for Hume 62'–72'), 19. Joe Hopes (for Henderson 74'), 20. Sean Reffell (for Augustus 40'), 21. Conor McKee (for Doak 78'), 22. Jake Flannery (for Murphy 78'), 23. Jude Postlethwaite (for McCloskey 28'). | | | | Attendance: 11,280; Referee: Ben Whitehouse |

| 25 October 2025 | (1 BP) Lions (South Africa) | 49–31 | (Ireland) Ulster (1 BP) | Ellis Park Stadium, Johannesburg |
| 12:45 | Try: Kotze 2'; Keyter 8'; Venter 46'; Du Plessis 61'; Van Wyk 71'; Van Vuuren 76'; Brandon 81'; Con: C. Smith (4) 3', 9', 47', 62'; Pen: C. Smith (2) 33', 50'; Cards: Ntlabakanye (yellow card) 27' | Report; Match centre | Try: Baloucoune (3) 5', 40', 52'; Hume 24'; McCann 67'; Con: Doak (2) 6', 24'; Flannery 67' | Attendance: 4,061; Referee: Ben Connor |
| Ulster: 1. Sam Crean, 2. Rob Herring (c), 3. Tom O'Toole, 4. Harry Sheridan, 5. Joe Hopes, 6. David McCann, 7. Tom Stewart, 8. Bryn Ward, 9. Nathan Doak, 10. Jack Murphy, 11. Zac Ward, 12. Jude Postlethwaite, 13. James Hume, 14. Robert Baloucoune, 15. Michael Lowry.; Replacements: 16. James McCormick (for McCann 74'), 17. Callum Reid (for Crean 51'), 18. Scott Wilson (for O'Toole 48'), 19. Matty Dalton (for Hopes 58'), 20. Marcus Rea (for B. Ward 62'), 21. Conor McKee (for Doak 69'), 22. Jake Flannery (for Murphy 62'), 23. Werner Kok (for Z. Ward 62'). | | | | Attendance: 4,061; Referee: Ben Connor |

| 28 November 2025 | (1 BP) Ulster (Ireland) | 47–13 | (Italy) Benetton | Ravenhill Stadium, Belfast |
| 19:45 | Try: Baloucoune (2) 10', 77'; Kok (2) 22', 58'; Hume 52'; Penalty try 63'; Sheridan 68'; Con: Doak (3) 23', 53', 60'; Flannery (2) 68', 78' | Report; Match centre | Try: Bernasconi 28'; Con: Umaga 29'; Pen: Umaga (2) 15', 40+3'; Cards: Ratave 63' | Attendance: 11,517; Referee: Sam Grove-White |
| Ulster: 1. Sam Crean, 2. Tom Stewart, 3. Scott Wilson, 4. Harry Sheridan, 5. Matty Dalton, 6. David McCann, 7. Nick Timoney (c), 8. Juarno Augustus, 9. Nathan Doak, 10. Jack Murphy, 11. Werner Kok, 12. Jude Postlethwaite, 13. James Hume, 14. Robert Baloucoune, 15. Jacob Stockdale.; Replacements: 16. Rob Herring (for Stewart 51-73'), 17. Callum Reid (for Crean 51'), 18. Tom O'Toole (for Wilson 56'), 19. Charlie Irvine (for Dalton 9'), 20. Bryn Ward (for Augustus 63'), 21. David Shanahan (for Doak 67'), 22. Jake Flannery (for Murphy 67'), 23. Stewart Moore (for Postlethwaite 63'). | | | | Attendance: 11,517; Referee: Sam Grove-White |

| 19 December 2025 | (1 BP) Leinster (Ireland) | 24–20 | (Ireland) Ulster (1 BP) | Aviva Stadium, Dublin |
| 19:45 | Try: Ioane 27'; Kenny 54'; Lowe 66'; Sheehan 74'; Con: Prendergast 27'; Byrne 75'; Cards: Ryan (yellow card) 59' | Report; Match centre | Try: Kok (2) 14', 34'; Stewart 38'; Con: Doak 35'; Pen: Doak 62'; Cards: McCann (yellow card) 72' | Referee: Andrew Brace |
| Ulster: 1. Angus Bell, 2. Tom Stewart, 3. Tom O'Toole, 4. Harry Sheridan, 5. Charlie Irvine, 6. David McCann, 7. Nick Timoney (c), 8. Juarno Augustus, 9. Nathan Doak, 10. Jack Murphy, 11. Werner Kok, 12. Stuart McCloskey, 13. Jude Postlethwaite, 14. Robert Baloucoune, 15. Jacob Stockdale.; Replacements: 16. John Andrew (for Stewart 65-72'), 17. Sam Crean (for Bell 55'), 18. Scott Wilson (for O'Toole 55'), 19. Joe Hopes (for Irvine 47'), 20. Bryn Ward (for Augustus 64'), 21. Conor McKee (for Doak 680') 22. Jake Flannery, 23. Ethan McIlroy (for Baloucoune 50'). | | | | Referee: Andrew Brace |

| 27 December 2025 | (1 BP) Connacht (Ireland) | 24–29 | (Ireland) Ulster (1 BP) | The Sportsground, Galway |
| 17:30 | Try: Treacy 24'; Jansen 66'; Devine 77'; Con: Gilbert (3) 25', 67', 77'; Pen: Gilbert 31'; Cards: Aki (yellow card) 43'; Joyce (yellow card) 16' | Report; Match centre | Try: Z. Ward (2) 34', 40+1'; Kok 47'; Penalty try 53'; Con: Murphy (2) 34', 48'; Pen: Murphy 80+1'; Cards: Murphy (yellow card) 16'; McCloskey (yellow card) 43' | Referee: Eoghan Cross |
| Ulster: 1. Sam Crean, 3. Tom Stewart, 3. Scott Wilson, 4. Harry Sheridan, 5. Cormac Izuchukwu, 6. David McCann, 7. Nick Timoney (c), 8. Juarno Augustus, 9. Conor McKee, 10. Jack Murphy, 11. Zac Ward, 12. Stuart McCloskey, 13. James Hume, 14. Werner Kok, 15. Jacob Stockdale.; Replacements: 16. John Andrew, 17. Angus Bell (for Crean 41'), 18. Tom O'Toole (for Wilson 41'), 19. Joe Hopes (for Izuchukwu 72'), 20. Bryn Ward (for Augustus 64'), 21. Nathan Doak (for McKee 51'), 22. Jake Flannery (for Stockdale 78'), 23. Jude Postlethwaite (for McCloskey 64'). | | | | Referee: Eoghan Cross |

| 2 January 2026 | Ulster (Ireland) | 28–3 | (Ireland) Munster | Ravenhill Stadium, Belfast |
| 19:45 | Try: Stewart 48'; Flannery 55'; B. Ward 72'; Con: Doak (2) 49', 72'; Pen: Doak (3) 5', 25', 43' | Report; Match centre | Pen: Hanrahan 28' | Attendance: 18,196; Referee: Mike Adamson |
| Ulster: 1. Angus Bell, 2. Tom Stewart, 3. Tom O'Toole, 4. Iain Henderson (c), 5. Joe Hopes, 6. Cormac Izuchukwu, 7. Nick Timoney, 8. Bryn Ward, 9. Nathan Doak, 10. Jack Murphy, 11. Zac Ward, 12. Stuart McCloskey, 13. James Hume, 14. Werner Kok, 15. Jacob Stockdale.; Replacements: 16. Rob Herring (for Stewart 57'), 17. Eric O'Sullivan (for Bell 53'), 18. Scott Wilson (for O'Toole 57'), 19. Harry Sheridan (for Henderson 57'), 20. David McCann (for Izuchukwu 61'), 21. Conor McKee (for Doak 80'), 22. Jake Flannery (for Stockdale 49'), 23. Jude Postlethwaite (for McCloskey 61'). | | | | Attendance: 18,196; Referee: Mike Adamson |

| 24 January 2026 | Scarlets (Wales) | 27–22 | (Ireland) Ulster (1 BP) | Parc y Scarlets, Llanelli |
| 15:00 | Try: Murray 10'; Macleod 32'; Mee 80+3'; Con: Costelow (3) 11', 33', 80+4'; Pen: Costelow (2) 6', 72'; Cards: Plumtree (yellow card) 66' | Report; Match centre | Try: Stewart 20'; B. Ward 27'; Wilson 68'; Con: Doak (2) 27', 68'; Pen: Doak 76'; Cards: Kok (yellow card) 80+2' | Referee: Griffin Colby |
| Ulster: 1. Angus Bell, 2. Tom Stewart, 3. Tom O'Toole, 4. Iain Henderson (c), 5. Charlie Irvine, 6. David McCann, 7. Nick Timoney, 8. Bryn Ward, 9. Nathan Doak, 10. Jack Murphy, 11. Werner Kok, 12. Stuart McCloskey, 13. James Hume, 14. Robert Baloucoune, 15. Michael Lowry.; Replacements: 16. Rob Herring (for Stewart 52'), 17. Eric O'Sullivan (for Bell 52'), 18. Scott Wilson (for O'Toole 52'), 19. Harry Sheridan (for Henderson 61'), 20. Matthew Dalton (for B. Ward 69'), 21. Conor McKee, 22. Jake Flannery (for Lowry 1'), 23. Jude Postlethwaite (for Baloucoune 41'). | | | | Referee: Griffin Colby |

| 31 January 2026 | Ulster (Ireland) | 21–14 | (Wales) Cardiff (1 BP) | Ravenhill Stadium, Belfast |
| 19:45 | Try: Wilson 12'; Bell 19'; Irvine 66'; Con: Murphy (3) 12', 19', 67' | Report; Match centre | Try: Mulder 54'; Emanuel 68'; Con: Sheedy (2) 55', 69' | Attendance: 12,012; Referee: Hollie Davidson |
| Ulster: 1. Angus Bell, 2. Rob Herring, 3. Scott Wilson, 4. Iain Henderson (c), 5. Charlie Irvine, 6. Matthew Dalton, 7. Marcus Rea, 8. David McCann, 9. Conor McKee, 10. Jack Murphy, 11. Zac Ward, 12. Ben Carson, 13. James Hume, 14. Werner Kok, 15. Ethan McIlroy.; Replacements: 16. James McCormick, 17. Sam Crean (for Bell 55'), 18. Bryan O'Connor (for Wilson 76'), 19. Harry Sheridan (for Henderson 55'), 20. Lorcan McLoughlin (for Rea 63'), 21. David Shanahan (for McKee 63'), 22. Jake Flannery (for McIlroy 71'), 23. Ben Moxham. | | | | Attendance: 12,012; Referee: Hollie Davidson |

| 28 February 2026 | Ospreys (Wales) | 21–10 | (Ireland) Ulster | Brewery Field, Bridgend |
| 19:45 | Try: Foley 3'; Ratti 68'; Kasdende 77'; Con: Walsh (3) 4', 69', 78' | Report; Match centre | Try: Z. Ward 9'; Stewart 12'; Cards: Rea (yellow card) 75' | Attendance: 3,761; Referee: Filippo Russo |
| Ulster: 1. Eric O'Sullivan, 2. Tom Stewart, 3. Scott Wilson, 4. Iain Henderson (c), 5. Charlie Irvine, 6. Matthew Dalton, 7. David McCann, 8. Bryn Ward, 9. Nathan Doak, 10. Jack Murphy, 11. Zac Ward, 12. Jude Postlethwaite, 13. James Hume, 14. Werner Kok, 15. Michael Lowry.; Replacements: 16. Rob Herring (for Stewart 57'), 17. Angus Bell (for O'Sullivan 49'), 18. Brian O'Connor (for Wilson 60'), 19. Harry Sheridan (for Henderson 57'), 20. Marcus Rea (for Dalton 57'), 21. Conor McKee (for Doak 57'), 22. Jake Flannery, 23. Ben Carson (for Postlethwaite 75'). | | | | Attendance: 3,761; Referee: Filippo Russo |

| 13 March 2026 (Note: Postponed from 3 October due to weather conditions.) | Edinburgh (Scotland) | 19–40 | (Ireland) Ulster (1 BP) | Edinburgh Rugby Stadium |
| 19:45 | Try: Thompson 6'; Paterson 21'; Goosen 31'; Con: Thompson (2) 6', 22'; Cards: Morris (red card) 64' | Report; Match centre | Try: Irvine 10'; Augustus 35'; Flannery 50'; Wilson 62'; McKee 69'; Carson 74'; Con: Murphy (5/6) 11', 35', 63', 70', 75'; Cards: Z. Ward (yellow card) 1'; Sheridan (red card) 45' | Attendance: 7,989; Referee: Federico Vedovelli |
| Ulster: 1. Angus Bell, 2. Rob Herring (c), 3. Tom McAllister, 4. Harry Sheridan, 5. Charlie Irvine, 6. Cormac Izuchukwu, 7. Bryn Ward, 8. Juarno Augustus, 9. David Shanahan, 10. Jack Murphy, 11. Zac Ward, 12. Jude Postlethaite, 13. James Hume, 14. Werner Kok, 15. Michael Lowry.; Replacements: 16. James McCormick (for Herring 60'), 17. Sam Crean (for Bell 60'), 18. Scott Wilson (for McAllister 48'), 19. Joe Hopes (for Sheridan 67'), 20. David McCann (for B. Ward 48', B. Ward for Izuchukwu 67'), 21. Conor McKee (for Shanahan 3'), 22. Jake Flannery (for Hume 42'), 23. Ben Carson (For Postlethwaite 36'). | | | | Attendance: 7,989; Referee: Federico Vedovelli |

| 20 March 2026 | (1 BP) Ulster (Ireland) | 19–26 | (Ireland) Connacht (1 BP) | Ravenhill Stadium, Belfast |
| 19:45 | Try: Doak 24'; Z. Ward 65'; Bell 75'; Con: Doak 24'; Murphy 76' | Report; Match centre | Try: Jansen (2) 19', 57'; Bealham; Treacy (2) 61', 68'; Con: Naughton (3) 20', 58', 69'; Cards: Bealham (yellow card) 38' | Attendance: 12,000; Referee: Mike Adamson |
| Ulster: 1. Angus Bell, 2. Tom Stewart, 3. Scott Wilson, 4. Iain Henderson (c), 5. Joe Hopes, 6. David McCann, 7. Marcus Rea, 8. Juarno Augustus, 9. Nathan Doak, 10. Jack Murphy, 11. Zac Ward, 12. Ben Carson, 13. Jacob Stockdale, 14. Werner Kok, 15. Michael Lowry.; Replacements: 16. Rob Herring (for Stewart 59'), 17. Sam Crean (for Bell 59-73'), 18. Tom O'Toole (for Wilson 51'), 19. Matthew Dalton (for Henderson 55'), 20. Bryn Ward (for Rea 21-33', 51'), 21. Conor McKee (for Doak 63'), 22. Jonny Scott (for McIlroy 63'), 23. Ethan McIlroy (for Lowry 6'). | | | | Attendance: 12,000; Referee: Mike Adamson |

| 28 March 2026 | Zebre Parma (Italy) | 12–28 | (Ireland) Ulster (1 BP) | Stadio Sergio Lanfranchi, Parma |
| 19:45 | Try: Di Bartolomeo 11'; Trulla 75'; Con: Farias 12'; Cards: Gesi (red card) 29' | Report; Match centre | Try: McAllister 20'; Herring 44'; Z. Ward 52'; Kok 68'; Con: Humphreys (2) 21', 45'; Doak (2) 53', 70'; Cards: Wilson (yellow card) 80+5' | Attendance: 3,256; Referee: Craig Evans |
| Ulster: 1. Eric O'Sullivan, 2. Rob Herring, 3. Tom McAllister, 4. Iain Henderson (c), 5. Joe Hopes, 6. David McCann, 7. Nick Timoney, 8. Bryn Ward, 9. Conor McKee, 10. James Humphreys, 11. Zac Ward, 12. Stuart McCloskey, 13. James Hume, 14. Werner Kok, 15. Ethan McIlroy.; Replacements: 16. James McCormick (for Herring 69'), 17. Angus Bell (for O'Sullivan 41'), 18. Scott Wilson (for McAllister 50'), 19. Matthew Dalton (for Henderson 61'), 20. Juarno Augustus (for B. Ward 50'), 21. Nathan Doak (for Humphreys 46') 22. Ben Carson (for Hume 65'), 23. Ben Moxham (for Z. Ward 56'). | | | | Attendance: 3,256; Referee: Craig Evans |

| 17 April 2026 | Ulster (Ireland) | 21–29 | (Ireland) Leinster (1 BP) | Ravenhill Stadium, Belfast |
| 19:45 | Try: B. Ward 55'; Z. Ward (2) 61', 65'; Con: Doak (3) 56', 63', 65'; Cards: Sheridan (yellow card) 46' | Match centre | Try: Culhane 16'; J. O'Brien 38'; Henshaw 45'; Prendergast 51'; Con: Prendergast (3) 17', 46', 51'; Pen: Prendergast 24'; Cards: Deegan (red card) 60' | Attendance: 18,196; Referee: Andrew Brace |
| Ulster: 1. Angus Bell, 2. Tom Stewart, 3. Tom O'Toole, 4. Iain Henderson (c), 5. Cormac Izuchukwu, 6. David McCann, 7. Sean Reffell, 8. Juarno Augustus, 9. Nathan Doak, 10. Jack Murphy, 11. Zac Ward, 12. Stuart McCloskey, 13. James Hume, 14. Werner Kok, 15. Jacob Stockdale.; Replacements: 16. James McCormick (for Stewart 76'), 17. Sam Crean (for Bell 8', for O'Toole 47'), 18. Scott Wilson (for Crean 41'), 19. Harry Sheridan (for Izuchukwu 41'), 20. Bryn Ward (for Reffell 47'), 21. Conor McKee, 22. Jake Flannery (for Murphy 76'), 23. Jude Postlethwaite (for Hume 10'). | | | | Attendance: 18,196; Referee: Andrew Brace |

| 25 April 2026 | (1 BP) Munster (Ireland) | 44–14 | (Ireland) Ulster | Thomond Park, Limerick |
| 17:40 | Try: Hodnett (4) 24', 29', 55', 68'; Kendellen (3) 47', 53', 69'; Con: Hanrahan (3) 33', 53', 70' | Match centre | Try: Arenzana-King 13'; Andrew 65'; Con: Flannery (2) 13', 66'; Cards: Brigg (yellow card) 23' | Referee: Sam Grove-White |
| Ulster: 1. Eric O'Sullivan, 2. James McCormick, 3. Bryan O'Connor, 4. Harry Sheridan, 5. Charlie Irvine, 6. James McKillop, 7. Tom Brigg, 8. Lorcan McLoughlin, 9. Conor McKee, 10. Jake Flannery, 11. Ben Moxham, 12. Ben Carson, 13. Ethan McIlroy, 14. Aitzol Arenzana-King, 15. Michael Lowry (c).; Replacements: 16. John Andrew (for McCormick 57'), 17. Callum Reid (for O'Sullivan 31'), 18. Tom McAllister (for O'Connor 40'), 19. Joe Hopes (for McKillop 54'), 20. Marcus Rea (for Brigg 57'), 21. David Shanahan (for McKee 54'), 22. James Humphreys (for Lowry 61'), 23. Jonny Scott (for Carson 16'). | | | | Referee: Sam Grove-White |

| 8 May 2026 | (1 BP) Ulster (Ireland) | 38–38 | (South Africa) Stormers (1 BP) | Ravenhill Stadium, Belfast |
| 19:45 | Try: Kok (3) 4', 28', 71'; Z. Ward 35'; Lowry 45'; O'Sullivan 75'; Con: Doak (4) 5', 30', 36', 77'; Cards: Henderson (red card) 9'; Doak (yellow card) 80' | Match centre | Try: Roos 6'; Feinberg-Mngomezulu (2) 14', 64'; Khan 49'; Penalty try 80'; Con: Feinberg-Mngomezulu (4) 7', 15', 49', 64'; Pen: Feinberg-Mngomezulu 21'; Cards: Matthee (yellow card) 76' | Attendance: 9,782; Referee: Andrea Piardi |
| Ulster: 1. Angus Bell, 2. James McCormick, 3. Scott Wilson, 4. Iain Henderson (c), 5. Charlie Irvine, 6. Cormac Izuchukwu, 7. Nick Timoney, 8. Juarno Augustus, 9. Nathan Doak, 10. Jack Murphy, 11. Zac Ward, 12. Jude Postlethwaite, 13. Ethan McIlroy, 14. Werner Kok, 15. Michael Lowry.; Replacements: 16. Tom Stewart (for McCormick 41'), 17. Eric O'Sullivan (for Bell 55'), 18. Tom McAllister (for Wilson 58'), 19. Harry Sheridan (for Henderson 31'), 20. Bryn Ward (for Augustus 61'), 21. Conor McKee, 22. Jake Flannery (for Murphy 13-26', 65'), 23. Wilhelm de Klerk. | | | | Attendance: 9,782; Referee: Andrea Piardi |

| 15 May 2026 | (2 BP) Ulster (Ireland) | 22–26 | (Scotland) Glasgow Warriors (1 BP) | Ravenhill Stadium, Belfast |
| 19:45 | Try: Z. Ward (2) 19', 33'; McIlroy; Murphy 68'; Con: Flannery 34' | Match centre | Try: McDowall 8'; McBeth 37'; Horne 40+2'; Rowe 76'; Con: Horne (3) 9', 38', 40+3'; Cards: McBeth (yellow card) 22'; McKay (yellow card) 45' | Attendance: 11,556; Referee: Gianluca Gnecchi |
| Ulster: 1. Sam Crean, 2. Rob Herring, 3. Tom O'Toole, 4. Harry Sheridan, 5. Charlie Irvine, 6. Joe Hopes, 7. Nick Timoney (c), 8. Bryn Ward, 9. Conor McKee, 10. Jake Flannery, 11. Zac Ward, Wilhelm de Klerk, 13. James Hume, 14. Werner Kok, 15. Michael Lowry.; Replacements: 16. Tom Stewart (for Herring 14'), 17. Angus Bell (for Crean 41'), 18. Scott Wilson (for O'Toole 53'), 19. Cormac Izuchukwu (for Sheridan 41'), 20. Lorcan McLoughlin (for Irvine 53'), 21. Nathan Doak (for McKee 41'), 22. Jack Murphy (for De Klerk 52'), 23. Ethan McIlroy (for Kok 41'). | | | | Attendance: 11,556; Referee: Gianluca Gnecchi |

=== European Challenge Cup ===
Ulster were drawn in Pool 3 of the 2025–26 EPCR Challenge Cup, alongside Cardiff, Cheetahs, Exeter Chiefs, Racing 92 and Stade Français. The European Rugby Champions Cup rules do not apply, so Ulster would play URC rivals Cardiff, Racing 92 and Stade Français from France, and former Pro14 rivals, Cheetahs, but would not play Prem Rugby side Exeter Chiefs at this stage.

EPCR Challenge Cup Pool 3
| Pos | Team | Pld | W | D | L | PF | PA | PD | TF | TA | TB | LB | Pts | Qualification |
|---|---|---|---|---|---|---|---|---|---|---|---|---|---|---|
| 1 | (Ireland) Ulster (3) | 4 | 3 | 0 | 1 | 141 | 55 | +86 | 21 | 8 | 4 | 1 | 17 | Home round of 16 |
| 2 | (France) Stade Français (4) | 4 | 3 | 0 | 1 | 129 | 90 | +39 | 19 | 13 | 3 | 1 | 16 | Home round of 16 |
| 3 | (England) Exeter Chiefs (7) | 4 | 2 | 1 | 1 | 129 | 70 | +59 | 18 | 11 | 3 | 1 | 14 | Home round of 16 |
| 4 | (Wales) Cardiff (15) | 4 | 2 | 0 | 2 | 78 | 108 | −30 | 11 | 17 | 2 | 0 | 10 | Away round of 16 |
| 5 | (France) Racing 92 | 4 | 1 | 1 | 2 | 82 | 152 | −70 | 13 | 21 | 2 | 0 | 8 | |
| 6 | (South Africa) Cheetahs | 4 | 0 | 0 | 4 | 62 | 146 | −84 | 9 | 21 | 1 | 1 | 2 | |

Source: EPCR
Rules for classification: Tiebreakers for teams tied on points: 1) Number of matches won; 2) Difference between points for and against; 3) Total number of points for; 4) Aggregate number of points scored in matches between tied teams; 5) Number of matches won excluding the first match, then the second and so on until the tie is settled.

==== Pool matches ====
| 5 December 2025 | (1 BP) Ulster (Ireland) | 61–7 | (France) Racing 92 | Ravenhill Stadium, Belfast |
| 20:00 | Try: Stockdale (2) 15', 79'; Herring 35'; O'Toole 42'; Stewart 48'; Wilson 59'; Flannery 68'; Z. Ward (2) 73', 80+3'; Con: Murphy (8) 16', 36', 49', 59', 68', 74', 80', 80+3' | Report; Match centre | Try: Gibert 8'; Con: Gibert 9'; Cards: Sanconnie (yellow card) 50' | Attendance: 10,426; Referee: Ben Breakspear |
| Ulster: 1. Sam Crean, 2. Rob Herring, 3. Tom O'Toole, 4. Harry Sheridan, 5. Charlie Irvine, 6. David McCann, 7. Nick Timoney (c), 8. Juarno Augustus, 9. Nathan Doak, 10. Jack Murphy, 11. Zac Ward, 12. Jude Postlethwaite, 13. James Hume, 14. Robert Baloucoune, 15. Jacob Stockdale.; Replacements: 16. Tom Stewart (for Herring 40'), 17. Angus Bell (for Crean 53'), 18. Scott Wilson (for O'Toole 53'), 19. Joe Hopes (for Augustus 59'), 20. Bryn Ward (For Timoney 53'), 21. Conor McKee (for Doak 53'), 22. Jake Flannery (for Baloucoune 53'), 23. Stewart Moore (for Postlethwaite 24'). | | | | Attendance: 10,426; Referee: Ben Breakspear |

| 12 December 2025 | (1 BP) Cardiff (Wales) | 29–26 | (Ireland) Ulster (2 BP) | Cardiff Arms Park |
| 20:00 | Try: Nott 6'; Bowen 12'; Southworth 64'; D. Thomas 72'; Con: Halfpenny 7'; Sheedy (2) 64', 73'; Pen: Sheedy 80'; Cards: Botham (yellow card) 67' | Report; Match centre | Try: Stewart 21'; Hume 39'; Kok (2) 44', 53'; Con: Flannery (3) 22', 40', 54'; Cards: Sheridan (yellow card) 67'; Carson (yellow card) 72' | Attendance: 6,425; Referee: Evan Urruzmendi |
| Ulster: 1. Sam Crean, 2. Tom Stewart (c), 3. Tom O'Toole, 4. Harry Sheridan, 5. Charlie Irvine, 6. David McCann, 7. Sean Reffell, 8. Bryn Ward, 9. Conor McKee, 10. Jake Flannery, 11. Zac Ward, 12. Ben Carson, 13. James Hume, 14. Werner Kok, 15. Stewart Moore.; Replacements: 16. John Andrew (for Stewart 59'), 17. Angus Bell (for Crean 49'), 18. Rory McGuire (for O'Toole 59'), 19. Cormac Izuchukwu (for Irvine 49'), 20. Juarno Augustus (for Reffell 49'), 21. David Shanahan (for McKee 67'), 22. James Humphreys (for Flannery 76'), 23. Bradley McNamara (for Moore 16-21', 67'). | | | | Attendance: 6,425; Referee: Evan Urruzmendi |

| 11 January 2026 | Cheetahs (South Africa) | 0–28 | (Ireland) Ulster (1 BP) | Dukes Rugby, 's-Hertogenbosch, Netherlands |
| 16:15 | | Walkover | | Referee: Kevin Bralley |

| 17 January 2026 | (1 BP) Ulster (Ireland) | 26–19 | (France) Stade Français (1 BP) | Ravenhill Stadium, Belfast |
| 13:00 | Try: O'Toole 1' c Baloucoune 14' m McCloskey 23' c Doak 30' c Con: Murphy (3/4) 2', 24', 31' | Report; Match centre | Try: Melikidze 46' c Laloi 54' m Peyresblanques 66' c Con: Foursans-Bourdette (2/3) 47', 67' | Attendance: 11,900; Referee: Adam Leal |
| Ulster: 1. Sam Crean, 2. Tom Stewart, 3. Tom O'Toole, 4. Iain Henderson (c), 5. Harry Sheridan, 6. David McCann, 7. Nick Timoney, 8. Bryn Ward, 9. Nathan Doak, 10. Jack Murphy, 11. Zac Ward, 12. Stuart McCloskey, 13. James Hume, 14. Robert Baloucoune, 15. Jacob Stockdale.; Replacements: 16. Rob Herring (for Stewart 50'), 17. Eric O'Sullivan (for Crean 50'), 18. Scott Wilson (for O'Toole 51'), 19. Matthew Dalton (for Henderson 62'), 20. Sean Reffell (for McCann 62'), 21. Conor McKee, 22. Jake Flannery, 23. Jude Postlethwaite (for Hune 51'). | | | | Attendance: 11,900; Referee: Adam Leal |

==== Knockout stage ====
Ulster qualified for the round of 16 when they confirmed a top four finish in Pool 3 in Round 3 with the award of a 28-0 victory over Cheetahs. They confirmed a top four seeding, a home tie in the round of 16, and a potential home quarter-final, with a bonus-point victory over Stade Français Paris, 26-19, in Round 4 of Pool 3.

Round of 16
1 | (France) Montpellier | 53
16 | (France) Perpignan | 13
8 | (Ireland) Connacht | 29
9 | (South Africa) Sharks | 12
5 | (Italy) Zebre Parma | 31
12 | (France) Pau | 15
4 | (France) Stade Français | 31
13 | (Wales) Dragons | 36
3 | (Ireland) Ulster | 28
14 | (Wales) Ospreys | 24
6 | (England) Newcastle Red Bulls | 18
11 | (France) La Rochelle | 26
2 | (Italy) Benetton | 38
15 | (Wales) Cardiff | 35
7 | (England) Exeter Chiefs | 31
10 | (Ireland) Munster | 21

Quarter-finals
1 | (France) Montpellier | 45
8 | (Ireland) Connacht | 22
5 | (Italy) Zebre Parma | 32
13 | (Wales) Dragons | 35
3 | (Ireland) Ulster | 41
11 | (France) La Rochelle | 24
2 | (Italy) Benetton | 41
7 | (England) Exeter Chiefs | 44

Semi-finals
1 | (France) Montpellier | 18
13 | (Wales) Dragons | 12
3 | (Ireland) Ulster | 29
7 | (England) Exeter Chiefs | 12

Final
1 | (France) Montpellier | 59
3 | (Ireland) Ulster | 26

Round of 16

| 4 April 2026 | Ulster (Ireland) (3) | 28–24 | (14) (Wales) Ospreys | Ravenhill Stadium, Belfast |
| 20:00 | Try: Izuchukwu 3'; McCann 34'; Stockdale 45'; Timoney 55'; Con: Doak (4) 4', 35', 46'; Cards: Murphy (yellow card) 68' | Report; Match centre | Try: Reuben Morgan-Williams 9'; Kasende 19'; Penalty try 68'; Con: Edwards (2) 9', 20'; Pen: Edwards 29'; Cards: J. Morgan (yellow card) 56' | Attendance: 7,858; Referee: Anthony Woodthorpe |
| Ulster: 1. Angus Bell, 2. Rob Herring, 3. Tom O'Toole, 4. Iain Henderson (c), 5. Cormac Izuchukwu, 6. David McCann, 7. Nick Timoney, 8. Juarno Augustus, 9. Nathan Doak, 10. Jake Flannery, 11. Jacob Stockdale, 12. Stuart McCloskey, 13. James Hume, 14. Werner Kok, 15. Ethan McIlroy.; Replacements: 16. Tom Stewart (for Herring 21'), 17. Sam Crean (for Bell 13'), 18. Scott Wilson (for O'Toole 62'; O'Toole for Crean 70'), 19. Charlie Irvine (for Henderson 57'), 20. Bryn Ward (for Augustus 57'), 21. Conor McKee (for Doak 67'), 22. Jack Murphy (for Flannery 56'), 23. Zac Ward (for Kok 62'). | | | | Attendance: 7,858; Referee: Anthony Woodthorpe |

Quarter-final

| 10 April 2026 | Ulster (Ireland) (3) | 41–24 | (11) (France) La Rochelle | Ravenhill Stadium, Belfast |
| 20:00 | Try: Z.Ward (2) 4', 46'; O'Toole 24'; Izuchukwu 36'; B. Ward 53'; McCormick 76'; Con: Doak (3) 5', 25', 37'; Flannery 77'; Pen: Doak 9'; Cards: Z. Ward (yellow card) 28' | Match centre | Try: Cancoriet 41'; Latu 51'; Sclavi 82'; Con: Jurd (3) 42', 53', 83'; Pen: Jurd 22' | Attendance: 7,169; Referee: Hollie Davidson |
| Ulster: 1. Angus Bell, 2. Tom Stewart, 3 Tom O'Toole, 4. Iain Henderson (c), 5. Cormac Izuchukwu, 6. David McCann, 7. Nick Timoney, 8. Juarno Augustus, 9. Nathan Doak, 10, Jack Murphy, 11. Zac Ward, 12. Stuart McCloskey, 13. James Hume, 14. Werner Kok, 15. Jacob Stockdale.; Replacements: 16. James McCormick (for Stewart 71'), 17. Sam Crean (for Bell 53'), 18. Scott Wilson (for O'Toole 58'), 19. Harry Sheridan (for Augustus 58'), 20. Bryn Ward (for Timoney 40'), 21. Conor McKee (for Doak 73'), 22. Jake Flannery (for Murphy 71'), 23. Jude Postlethwaite (for Hume 65'). | | | | Attendance: 7,169; Referee: Hollie Davidson |

Semi-final

| 2 May 2026 | Ulster (Ireland) (3) | 29–12 | (7) (England) Exeter Chiefs | Ravenhill Stadium, Belfast |
| 17:30 | Try: Augustus 27' c Murphy 46' c McCann 57' m Stewart 65' c Con: Doak (3/4) 27', 47', 66'; Pen: Doak 40'; Cards: Stockdale (yellow card) 29' | Match centre | Try: Vintcent 31' c Ridl 80+1' m Con: Slade 32'; Cards: Hammersley (yellow card) 73' | Attendance: 11,126; Referee: Pierre Brousset |
| Ulster: 1. Sam Crean, 2. Tom Stewart, 3. Tom O'Toole, 4. Iain Henderson (c), 5. Cormac Izuchukwu, 6. David McCann, 7. Nick Timoney, 8. Juarno Augustus, 9. Nathan Doak, 10. Jack Murphy, 11. Jacob Stockdale, 12. Stuart McCloskey, 13. Jude Postlethwaite, 14. Zac Ward, 15. Michael Lowry.; Replacements: 16. James McCormick (for Stewart 70'), 17. Eric O'Sullivan (for Crean 63'), 18. Tom McAllister (for O'Toole 68'), 19. Charlie Irvine (for Henderson 63'), 20. Bryn Ward (for Augustus 63'), 21. Conor McKee (for McCloskey 71'), 22. Jake Flannery (for Murphy 68'), 23. Ethan McIlroy (for Stockdale 40'). | | | | Attendance: 11,126; Referee: Pierre Brousset |

Final

| 22 May 2026 | Montpellier (France) (1) | 59–26 | (3) (Ireland) Ulster | San Mamés Stadium, Bilbao |
| 21:00 | Try: N'Gandebe 5'; Taofifénua (2) 15', 44'; Vunipola 31'; Bécognée 37'; Nouchi 48'; Erdocio 58'; Hounkpatin 63'; Vincent 78'; Con: Miotti (5) 6', 16', 32', 45', 49'; Coly (2) 59', 64' | Match centre | Try: Timoney 2'; Izuchukwu 27'; Baloucoune 55'; Lowry 72'; Con: Doak (2) 3', 56'; Flannery 72' | Attendance: 43,204; Referee: Matthew Carley |
| Ulster: 1. Angus Bell, 2. Tom Stewart, 3. Tom O'Toole, 4. Harry Sheridan, 5. Cormac Izuchukwu, 6. David McCann, 7. Nick Timoney, 8. Juarno Augustus, 9. Nathan Doak, 10. Jack Murphy, 11. Zac Ward, 12. Jude Postlethwaite, 13. James Hume, 14. Robert Baloucoune, 15. Michael Lowry.; Replacements: 16. James McCormick (for Stewart 76'), 17. Eric O'Sullivan (for Bell 49'), 18. Scott Wilson (for O'Toole 49'), 19. Charlie Irvine (for Sheridan 61'), 20. Bryn Ward (for Augustus 56'), 21. Conor McKee (for Doak 64'), 22. Jake Flannery (for Murphy 64'), 23. Ethan McIlroy (for Postlethwaite 57'). | | | | Attendance: 43,204; Referee: Matthew Carley |

=== Friendly ===
| 12 September 2025 | Ulster (Ireland) | 31–19 | (Scotland) Edinburgh | Ravenhill Stadium, Belfast |
| 19:35 | Try: Izuchukwu; Postlethwaite; Z. Ward; McCormick; Scott; Con: Murphy (2); Flannery; Cards: Graham (yellow card) | Report | Try: McConnell; Wells; Jones; Con: Thompson (2) |
Ulster: 1. Callum Reid, 2. John Andrew, 3. Tom O'Toole, 4. Iain Henderson (c), 5. Matthew Dalton, 6. Cormac Izuchukwu, 7. Sean Reffell, 8. David McCann, 9. Nathan Doak, 10. Jack Murphy, 11. Zac Ward, 12. Jude Postlethwaite, 13. James Hume, 14. Werner Kok, 15. Jake Flannery.; Replacements: James McCormick, Sam Crean, Scott Wilson, Harry Sheridan, Nick Timoney, Marcus Rea, Conor McKee, Jonny Scott, Ben Carson, Ethan Graham, Lukas Kenny, Wilhelm de Klerk.

== Women's personnel ==
=== Staff ===
Ulster senior women's coaching staff
| Position | Name | Nationality |
|---|---|---|
| Head coach | Murray Houston | Scotland |
| Contact skills coach | Neill Alcorn | Ireland |
| Defence coach | Eric O'Sullivan | Ireland |
| Athletic development coach | Kevin Gallagher | Ireland |
| Team manager | Marianne Breen | Ireland |
| Physio | Martin Dunlop | Ireland |

=== Squad ===
Ulster Senior Women's Squad
| **Props**: (Ireland) Sophie Barrett (Enniskillen/Railway Union); (Ireland) Bronach Cassidy (Suttonians); (Ireland) Ava Fannin (Blackrock); (Ireland) Sophie McAlister (Ballymena); (Ireland) **Sadhbh McGrath** (Cooke); (Ireland) Aishling O'Connell (Monaghan); **Hookers**: (Ireland) Maebh Clenaghan (Queen's University); (Ireland) Sarah Roberts (Queen's University); (Ireland) Megan Simpson (Cooke); (Ireland) Emily Whittle (Queen's University); **Locks**: (Ireland) Brenda Barr (Suttonians, vc); (Ireland) Keelin Brady (Railway Union); (Ireland) Lauren Darley (Queen's University); (Ireland) Cara McLean (Larne); (Ireland) Ellen Patterson (Cooke) | **Back row**: (Ireland) Rebecca Beacom (Enniskillen); (Ireland) India Daley (Enniskillen, c); (Ireland) Katie Hetherington (Cooke); (Ireland) Christy Hill (Cooke); (Ireland) Moya Hill (Enniskillen); (Ireland) **Brittany Hogan** (Old Belvedere); (Ireland) Ciara O'Donnell (Eniskillen); (Ireland) Stacey Sloan (Cooke); (Ireland) Ruby Starrett (Queen's University); (Ireland) **Fiona Tuite** (Old Belvedere); **Scrum-halves**: (Ireland) Georgia Boyce (Enniskillen); (Ireland) Rachael McIlroy (Suttonians); **Out-halves**: (Ireland) Lauren Farrell-McCabe (Suttonians); (Ireland) Abby Moyles (UL Bohemian) | **Centres**: (Ireland) Farrah Cartin McCloskey (Enniskillen); (Ireland) Catherine Martin (Blackrock); (Ireland) Kelly McCormill (Cooke); (Ireland) Tara O'Neill (Cooke); (Ireland) Siobhan Sheerin (Clogher Valley); **Back three**: (Ireland) Kate Farrell McCabe (Suttonians); (Ireland) Ciara Fitzsimons (Queen's University); (Ireland) Katie Gilmour (Cooke); (Ireland) Niamh Marley (Cooke); (Ireland) Erin McConalogue (Inishowen); (Ireland) Sophie Meeke (Enniskillen); (Ireland) Paige Smyth (Cooke); (Ireland) Lucy Thompson (Enniskillen) |
(c) denotes the team captain, (vc) denotes the team vice-captain. **Bold** denotes internationally capped players.

== Women's competitions and results ==
=== IRFU Women's Interprovincial Series ===
The 2025 IRFU Women's Interprovincial Series was played between 10 and 30 August.

| 10 August 2025 | (1 BP) Leinster | 37–21 | Ulster | Energia Park, Dublin |
| | Try: Baker (2) 11', 53'; Brogan (3) 17', 39', 78'; Neill 32'; Gaffney 44'; Con: Caughey 32' | Report | Try: Sheerin 34'; Daley 38'; Barrett 48'; Con: Sheerin (3) 35', 39', 48'; Cards: Barr (yellow card) 51' |
Ulster lineup: 1. Sarah Roberts, 2. Maebh Clenaghan, 3. Sophie Barrett, 4. Lauren Darley, 5. Brenda Barr, 6. Ruby Starrett, 7. Katie Hetherington, 8 India Daley (c), 9. Georgia Boyce, 10. Lauren Farrell-McCabe, 11. Paige Smyth, 12. Tara O'Neill, 13. Siobhan Sheerin, 14. Lucy Thompson, 15. Niamh Marley.; Replacements: 16. Megan Simpson (for Clenaghan 56'), 17. Cara McLean (for Roberts 56'), 18. Ava Fannin (for Barrett 56'), 19. Rebecca Beacom, 20. Moya Hill (for Daley 40'), 21. Rachael McIlroy (for Boyce 47'), 22. Kelly McCormill (for O'Neill 63'), 23. Stacey Sloan (for Hetherington 63').

| 16/17 August 2025 | Connacht | 12–7 | Ulster (1 BP) | The Sportsground, Galway |
| | Try: Sheerin; Con: Sheerin; Cards: Barr (yellow card) | Report | Try: Oviawe; Maher; Con: Nic Dhonnacha |
Ulster lineup: 1. Sarah Roberts, 2. Maebh Clenaghan, 3. Ava Fannin, 4. Lauren Darley, 5. Brenda Barr, 6. Moya Hill, 7. Ruby Starrett, 8. India Daley (c), 9. Georgia Boyce, 10. Lauren Farrell-McCabe, 11. Niamh Marley, 12. Tara O'Neill, 13. Siobhan Sheerin, 14. Lucy Thompson, 15. Kate Farrell-McCabe.; Replacements: 16. Cara McLean, 17. Megan Simpson, 18. Sophie Barrett, 19. Rebecca Beacom, 20 Katie Hetherington, 21. Sophie Meeke, 22. Kelly McCormill, 23. Stacey Sloan.

| 23 August 2025 | Ulster | 17–38 | Munster | Ravenhill Stadium, Belfast |
| | Try: Sheerin; Fitzsimons (2); Con: Sheerin | Report | Try: Pearse; Ugwueru; Finn; Og O'Leary; McInerney; Con: Finn (4) |
Ulster lineup: 1. Aisling O'Connell, 2. India Daley (c), 3. Sophie Barrett, 4. Ellen Patterson, 5. Brenda Barr, 6. Moya Hill, 7. Rebecca Beacom, 8. Stacey Sloan, 9. Sophie Meeke, 10. Abby Moyles, 11. Niamh Marley, 12. Kelly McCormill, 13. Siobhan Sheerin, 14. Ciara Fitzsimons, 15. Kate Farrell-McCabe.; Replacements: 16. Megan Simpson, 17. Bronach Cassidy, 18. Sophie McAlister, 19. Lauren Darley, 20. Ciara O'Donnell, 21. Georgia Boyce, 22. Farrah Cartin-McCloskey, 23. Katie Gilmour.

==== 3rd/4th place playoff ====
| 30 August 2025 | Connacht | 37–30 | Ulster | Energia Park, Dublin |
| 14:00 | Try: Clarke (2) 6', 76'; Nic Dhonnacha 38'; Ryder 41'; Browne 59'; Adams Verling 65'; Con: Nic Dhonnacha (2) 59', 66'; Pen: Nic Dhonnacha 79'; Cards: Oviawe (yellow card) 68' | | Try: O'Neill 18'; Moyles 29'; Barrett 36'; Daley 70'; Con: Moyles (2) 29', 37'; Pen: Moyles (2) 21', 73'; Cards: Clenaghan (yellow card) 78' |
Ulster lineup: 1. Cara McLean, 2. India Daley, 3. Sophie Barrett, 4. Lauren Darley, 5. Brenda Barr, 6. Moya Hill, 7. Ruby Starrett, 8. Stacey Sloan, 9. Georgia Boyce, 10. Abby Moyles, 11. Niamh Marley, 12. Tara O'Neill, 13. Siobhan Sheerin, 14. Ciara Fitzsimons, 15. Lauren Farrell-McCabe.; Replacements: 16. Maebh Clenaghan (for Sloan 51'), 17. Aisling O'Connell (for McLean 51-68', Barrett 68'), 18. Sarah Roberts (for Barrett 51'), 19. Emily Whittle, 20. Rebecca Beacom (for Barr 62'), 21. Sophie Meeke, 22. Kate Farrell-McCabe (for Lauren Farrell-McCabe 62'), 23. Lucy Thompson.

=== Friendlies ===
| 21 July 2025 | Ulster | 24–12 | Connacht | Ardgart, Enniskillen |
| | Try: McAllister; Sheerin; O'Donnell; Fitzsimons; Con: (2) | Report | Try: (2); Con: (1) |

| 26 July 2025 | Ulster | 26–5 | Leinster | Chambers Park, Portadown |
| | Try: Sloan; Sheerin; Boyce; Marley; Con: Farrell-McCabe (3) | Report | Try: Onigbode |
