= Andy Ward (rugby union) =

Irish rugby union player and coach

- Born: 8 September 1970 (age 56) Whangārei, New Zealand
- School: Melville High School
- Notable relative(s): Zac Ward (son); Bryn Ward (son)

Rugby union career
- Position: flanker
Amateur team(s)
Years	Team	Apps	(Points)
?-1991	Ōhaupō		
1991-1994	Hautapu RFC		
1994-2005	Ballynahinch RFC		
2005-2008	Belfast Harlequins		
Senior career
Years	Team	Apps	(Points)
1997-2005	Ulster	119	(95)
International career
Years	Team	Apps	(Points)
1998-2001	Ireland	28	(15)

Andy Ward (born 8 September 1970) is a New Zealand-born former rugby union player, who played flanker professionally for Ulster and internationally for Ireland.

Born in Whangārei, Ward attended Melville High School, where he first played rugby. He represented Ōhaupō at under-19 and senior level, and played for Hautapu for three years. He was selected for Waikato at 'B' level in 1991, and 'A' level in 1993. before joining Irish club Ballynahinch RFC in 1994. He so enjoyed his initial six-month stint that he returned the following season, as was made club captain. The club was promoted to senior status in his first season as captain, and later to the All-Ireland League.

After the required three years' residence, Ward became eligible to play for Ulster, and made his debut for the province in 1997. The residence rule for provincial rugby was removed not long after. He was named Player of the Year and Personality of the Year at the 1998 Ulster Rugby Awards. He was part of the side that won the 1998–99 Heineken Cup. He was named captain in 2001 by coach Alan Solomons. He lifted the Celtic Cup in 2004, and was named Supporters' Club Player of the Year in the 2004 Ulster Rugby Awards. He made his 100th appearance against Leinster in 2004.

Ward made his debut for Ireland in 1998, scoring a try against Wales. He won 28 caps, including playing in the 1999 World Cup, and tours to South Africa, Australia, and Argentina, the USA and Canada. He also played for the Barbarians against South Africa in 1999.

Ward announced his professional retirement at the end of the 2004-05 season, having made 119 appearances for Ulster. The following season, he joined Belfast Harlequins as director of rugby, acting as player-coach until 2008.

In 2011, Ward became the strength and conditioning coach of the Antrim Gaelic Football team He later ran a fitness studio in Dunadry, County Antrim, Northern Ireland. His son Zac is an Ireland Sevens international, who won the Men's Sevens Players' Player of the Year in the 2024 Rugby Players Ireland Awards, and joined Ulster in 2024. Another son, Bryn, is an Ireland under-20 international who joined the Ulster academy in 2024.

== Links ==
- Andy Ward at ESPNscrum (archived)
- Belfast Harlequins
- Ballynahinch RFC
