= Reffell =

Reffell is an anglicized surname. Notable people with the surname include:

- Derek Reffell (1928–2025), British naval officer, and governor of Gibraltar (1989–1993)
- Sean Reffell (born 1998), English rugby union player
- Tommy Reffell (born 1999), Welsh rugby union player
