= Martin Moloney =

Irish rugby union player

- Born: 19 October 1999 (age 27) Athy, County Kildare, Ireland
- Height: 1.88 m (6 ft 2 in)
- Weight: 104 kg (16.4 st; 229 lb)
- School: Knockbeg College, Carlow

Rugby union career
- Position: Flanker
Senior career
Years	Team	Apps	(Points)
2021–2024	Leinster	11	(0)
2024–26	Exeter Chiefs	25	(25)
2026-	Ulster	3	(5)
- Correct as of 31 October 2026
International career
Years	Team	Apps	(Points)
2019	Ireland U20s	5	(0)
- Correct as of 25 April 2021

Martin Moloney (born 19 October 1999) is an Irish rugby union player, currently playing for URC side Ulster, having formerly played for Leinster and Exeter Chiefs. His preferred position is flanker.

== Club career ==
=== Leinster ===
Moloney was a member of the under-20s squad for the 2019 Six Nations Under 20s Championship, and started in all five matches, which saw Ireland secure a grand slam victory for the first time since 2007. Subsequently he was named in the Leinster academy for the 2019-20 season. In April 2021, he made his Leinster debut in Round 11 of the Pro14 Rainbow Cup against Munster. In February 2022, he got his first start against Edinburgh in the United Rugby Championship.

=== Exeter ===
On the 11th September 2024, Exeter confirmed that they had signed Moloney after a successful trial period with the club.

=== Ulster ===
Moloney signed for Ulster ahead of the 2026-27 season.
