= Jack Murphy (rugby union) =

Irish rugby union player (born 2004)

- Born: 15 July 2004 (age 22) Bray, County Wicklow, Ireland
- Height: 1.75 m (5 ft 9 in)
- Weight: 84 kg (13.2 st; 185 lb)
- School: Presentation College, Bray
- Notable relative(s): Richie Murphy (father); Ben Murphy (brother); John Murphy (great uncle)

Rugby union career
- Position: Fly-half
Amateur team(s)
Years	Team	Apps	(Points)
2023-2024	Clontarf	4	(40)
2024-2025	Queen's University	7	(65)
- Correct as of 16 May 2025
Senior career
Years	Team	Apps	(Points)
2024–	Ulster	41	(137)
- Correct as of 31 October 2026
International career
Years	Team	Apps	(Points)
2024	Ireland U20	9	(79)
2024	Emerging Ireland	2	(4)
2026-	Ireland A	2	(6)
- Correct as of 20 November 2026

Jack Murphy (born 15 July 2004) is an Irish rugby union player who plays fly-half for Ulster.

The son of rugby coach Richie Murphy, he attended Presentation College, Bray, and represented Leinster and Ireland at age-grade level. He also played association football for Cabinteely F.C. as a teenager, and played club rugby for Clontarf in the All-Ireland League. he was offered a position in the Ulster academy in 2023, but opted to stay in the Leinster sub-academy for another year. He represented Ireland under-20s in their grand-slam-winning 2024 under-20 Six Nations and in the 2024 World Rugby U20 Championship, and joined the Ulster academy ahead of the 2024–25 season.

He played club rugby for Queen's University, and went on the Emerging Ireland tour to the Toyota Challenge in South Africa in 2024. He made his senior Ulster debut against Munster in December 2024, and his first start the following week against Connacht. He scored a try and was named player of the match in the home win against the Stormers in March 2025. By the end of the season he had established himself as Ulster's first choice out-half, and his rival Aidan Morgan was allowed to leave. Murphy was promoted from the academy onto a senior contract for the 2025–26 season. He was named Young Player of the Year at the 2026 Ulster Rugby Awards.

His older brother Ben Murphy plays scrum-half for Connacht.
