= Matthew Dalton =

Irish rugby union player

- Born: 16 November 1998 (age 27) Belfast, Northern Ireland
- Height: 1.97 m (6 ft 5 1/2 in)
- Weight: 118 kg (18.6 st; 260 lb)
- School: Belfast Royal Academy

Rugby union career
- Position(s): Lock, Flanker
Amateur team(s)
Years	Team	Apps	(Points)
- Malone
Senior career
Years	Team	Apps	(Points)
2017–2019 2025–2026	Ulster	24	(5)
2021	Utah Warriors	0	(0)
2021–2023	Newcastle Falcons	12	(5)
2023–2025	Soyaux Angoulême	22	(5)
2026–	Kobe Steelers	0	(0)
- Correct as of 28 March 2026
International career
Years	Team	Apps	(Points)
2018	Ireland U20	5	(5)
- Correct as of 12 June 2018

Matthew Dalton (born 16 November 1998) is an Irish rugby union player who plays for the Kobe Steelers in the Japan Rugby League One (JRLO). A graduate of the Ulster academy, he formerly played for Ulster (2017-19, 2025-26), Utah Warriors (2021), Newcastle Falcons (2021–23) and Soyaux Angoulême (2023–25). He plays primarily as a lock, but can also play as a flanker, and represented Malone in the All-Ireland League.

== Early life ==
Dalton was born in Belfast, Northern Ireland and attended Belfast Royal Academy. Before committing to rugby, he excelled at association football and athletics, particularly the pentathlon. He helped the school to the semi-finals of the 2016 Ulster Schools' Cup, where they lost to Royal Belfast Academical Institution, as well as earning representation for Ulster at under-17, under-18 and under-18 level and Ireland at under-18, under-19 and under-20 level.

== Club career ==
Dalton made his senior competitive debut for Ulster in their 23–22 win against Italian side Benetton in round 9 of the 2017–18 Pro14 on 24 November 2017.

Dalton signed for the Utah Warriors ahead of the 2021 Major League Rugby season.

On 22 June 2021, Dalton returned to the UK to join English side Newcastle Falcons in the Premiership Rugby on a two-year deal from the 2021–22 season. In 2023 he signed for Soyaux Angoulême in the French Pro D2. He returned to Ulster in January 2025 following a successful trial. He left Ulster at the end of the 2025-26 season, and joined Kobelco Kobe Steelers.

In July 2026, Dalton joined the Kobe Steelers in the Japan Rugby League One (JRLO).

== International career ==
Dalton was selected for the Ireland under-20's squad for the 2018 Six Nations Under 20s Championship, and made his debut for the side in their opening round 34–24 defeat against France on 2 February 2018, before going on to start against Scotland and England. Dalton was also selected in the under-20s squad for the 2018 World Rugby Under 20 Championship, starting against Georgia and Scotland.
