= Sam Crean =

English rugby union player (born 2000)

- Born: Sam Crean; 12 June 2000 (age 26) Gillingham, England
- Height: 1.75 m (5 ft 9 in)
- Weight: 115 kg (18 st 2 lb)
- School: Harrow School

Rugby union career
- Position: Front row
- Current team: Ulster
Amateur team(s)
Years	Team	Apps	(Points)
–	Medway RFC		
Senior career
Years	Team	Apps	(Points)
2018–2025	Saracens	19	(0)
2018–2019	→Bishop's Stortford	–	(–)
2020–2022	→Ampthill	13	(5)
2025	→Ulster	2	(0)
2025–	Ulster	18	(0)
- Correct as of 15 May 2025
International career
Years	Team	Apps	(Points)
2020	England U20	2	(5)
2026–	Ireland A	1	(0)
- Correct as of 6 February 2026

Sam Crean (born 12 June 2000) is an English professional rugby union player, who plays as a prop for United Rugby Championship side Ulster.

== Early life ==
Crean was born in Medway, Kent and grew up in Rochester. He played his junior rugby at Medway RFC, starting from the age of five and playing through to the U16s side, and also represented the Kent county rugby team at U15s and 16s level. He then secured a scholarship to attend Harrow School, after being spotted at a rugby festival by Saracens academy coach Rory Teague. His peers at the school included fellow future Saracens academy graduates Andy Onyeama-Christie, Elliott Obatoyinbo, Sean Reffell and Manu Vunipola.

== Rugby career ==
Crean joined the Saracens junior academy in 2015 and then graduated up to the senior academy in 2018, when he spent time out on loan at Bishop's Stortford for the 2018–19 National League 1 season. He initially played as a hooker, before transitioning into the role of loosehead prop. He was also involved in the Saracens Storm squad that won the Premiership Rugby Shield that season, including the 55–14 final victory over Newcastle Falcons A in 2019. His first-team debut arrived in the following season, making several appearances in the Premiership and Premiership Rugby Cup, as well as a single Champions Cup fixture against Racing 92.

Over the next two years, Crean was dual-registered with both Saracens and Ampthill, with the majority of his matches played for the latter club in the RFU Championship. Subsequently, he was promoted into the Saracens first-team squad on a full-time basis, ahead of the beginning of the 2022–23 season.

Crean has represented England at age-group level. He played two games for the England U20s during the abridged 2020 Six Nations, making his debut in a defeat to Ireland and then scoring a try against Wales.

Crean joined Ulster on a short-term loan deal in February 2025, and signed for them on a permanent basis from the 2025–26 season. He also qualifies to represent Ireland through ancestry and in February 2026 made his first appearance for Ireland A.
