= Melville High School =

School in Waikato, New Zealand

Location
- 6 Collins Road, Deanwell, Hamilton, Waikato; New Zealand
- Coordinates: 37°49′02″S 175°16′52″E

Information
- Funding type: State secondary school
- Motto: Māori: Hei awhina. Hei mahi (To serve. To work)
- Ministry of Education Institution no.: 137
- Principal: Clive Hamill
- Years offered: 9–13
- Gender: Coeducational
- Enrolment: (October 2025)
- Website: melville-high.school.nz

Melville High School was a state co-educational secondary school located in Hamilton, Waikato, New Zealand.

The school shut down at the end of 2023. A new school, Mangakōtukutuku College, opened in 2024.
