= Fiona Tuite =

Irish rugby union player (b. 1996)

Fiona Tuite (Ireland)
- Born: December 27, 1996 (age 29) Dublin, Ireland
- Height: 175 cm (5 ft 9 in)
- Weight: 86 kg (190 lb)

Rugby union career
- Position: Second row / Blindside flanker
- Current team: Ulster Rugby; Wolfhounds (rugby union)
International career
Years	Team	Apps	(Points)
2023–	Ireland	30	(10)
- Correct as of 31 October 2026

Fiona Tuite (born 27 December 1996) is an Irish rugby union player who plays as a second row and blindside flanker for Ulster Rugby and the Ireland women's national rugby union team. She made her international debut in 2023 and was part of Ireland's squad for the 2025 Women's Rugby World Cup.

Before switching to rugby, Tuite competed in athletics at international level, specialising in shot put. She represented Ireland in the 2013 IAAF World Youth Championships.

== Early life ==
Tuite was born in Dublin and initially pursued athletics, representing Ireland in youth competitions.

== Athletics career ==
Before her rugby career, Tuite was a promising shot put athlete. She represented Ireland at the 2013 IAAF World Youth Championships in Donetsk, Ukraine, competing in the women's shot put (3 kg). Tuite recorded a mark of 13.59 metres in the qualification round, placing 22nd overall in qualification.

== Club and provincial career ==
Tuite's strength and explosive power from athletics translated into rugby, where she joined Old Belvedere RFC and progressed to provincial rugby. She joined Ulster Rugby in 2023 and was named in their senior women's squad for the 2024 Vodafone Women's Interprovincial Championship. She took part in the official launch at the IRFU High Performance Centre and featured in Round 1 against Munster at Virgin Media Park on 10 August 2024.

She did not participate in the 2025 Interprovincial Series due to her selection for Ireland's Rugby World Cup squad.

Tuite has also featured for the Wolfhounds in the cross-border Celtic Challenge competition. She made four appearances for the Wolfhounds in the winning 2023–24 series, as confirmed in the squad announcement ahead of the 2024–25 competition. In December 2024 she was named to make their first Celtic Challenge starts of the season, lining up in the starting XV against Wales’ Gwalia Lightning at Virgin Media Park, Cork. The Wolfhounds claimed their second title.

== International career ==
Tuite earned her first cap for Ireland in 2023 and has since become a regular starter in the pack. She was selected for the 2025 Women's Rugby World Cup squad and made her tournament debut in Ireland's opening match against Japan, scoring a try and completing nine lineout takes in a 42–14 win. She played the full 80 minutes and led all Irish forwards with 37 metres carried and 19 post-contact metres.

As of August 2025, she had accumulated 18 caps and 5 points for Ireland. Her consistency in set-piece execution and defensive work rate have made her a key figure under head coach Scott Bemand.

== Style of play ==
Tuite is known for her aggressive tackling, aerial dominance in lineouts, and versatility across the forward pack. During the 2025 World Cup, she posted a 100% lineout success rate, completed 9 tackles, and won 1 turnover. She also made 7 successful passes with zero handling errors, demonstrating her reliability in phase play. She often plays as a second row but has also featured at blindside flanker, offering Ireland tactical flexibility in both attack and defence.

== Personal life ==
Tuite's athletic journey began in Gaelic football and track and field, representing Dublin at underage levels before gaining a place in the Ireland U18 Sevens camp ahead of the 2013 European Championships in Sweden. Injuries – notably an ankle fracture and a broken foot that kept her sidelined for almost three years – curtailed her early sevens career, but she made her first 15-a-side appearance for Trinity University before joining Old Belvedere RFC. Two seasons later, she earned her first cap for Ulster. In February 2020, she moved to Belfast to take up a role as a medical physiotherapist at the Ulster Hospital, where she worked on COVID-19 wards throughout the pandemic.

She maintains fitness by running, swimming (often at Helen's Bay with her dog), and HIIT/body-weight sessions. Her go-to pre-match anthem is “Turbulence” by Steve Aoki.

Tuite has spoken publicly about the support of her family and teammates, particularly during her World Cup debut, describing it as “a day of firsts” and “a dream come true”. She is also active in promoting women's rugby and youth sport development in Ulster and Ireland.

She married Ulster men's rugby player Eric O'Sullivan in July 2026.
