= Aitzol King =

Irish rugby union player

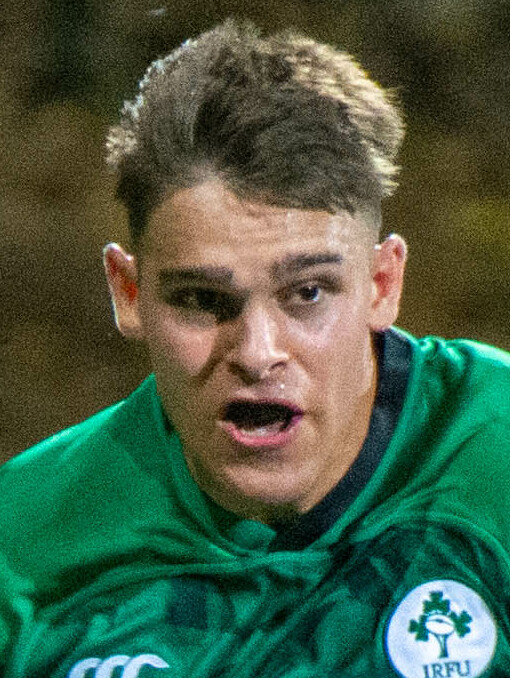
- Born: Aitzol Arenzana-King; 15 June 2002 (age 24) Gormanston, County Meath
- Height: 1.91 m (6 ft 3 in)
- Weight: 100.1 kg (15.76 st; 221 lb)
- School: Catholic University School and Gormanston College
- University: Technological University Dublin

Rugby union career
- Position(s): Winger, Full-back
Amateur team(s)
Years	Team	Apps	(Points)
- Balbriggan RFC
- Clontarf F.C.
Senior career
Years	Team	Apps	(Points)
2022–25	Leinster	3	(5)
2025–	Ulster	2	(5)
- Correct as of 22 September 2026
International career
Years	Team	Apps	(Points)
2022-	Ireland U20		

Aitzol Arenzana-King (born 15 June 2002) is an Irish rugby union player who plays as a full-back and winger for Ulster Rugby and Ireland U20, having trained in the academy for Leinster Rugby.

== Early life ==
One of triplets along with brothers, Iker and Kealan, he first played rugby with Balbriggan before joining Clontarf. He attended Gormanston College and was part of successful junior and senior teams before joining Catholic University School before enrolling at Technological University Dublin to study construction management. He was born to an Irish father and Basque mother.

== Career ==
He joined the Leinster academy ahead of the 2022–23 season. On 28 January 2023 he was included in the match day squad for the Leinster Rugby match in the United Rugby Championship against Cardiff Rugby. He made his first team debut from the bench. He left Leinster at the end of the 2024–25 season, and joined the Ulster academy ahead of the 2025–26 season. After being out for eight months with an anterior cruciate ligament injury, he made his Ulster debut, and scored a try, against Munster in April 2026. He joined the senior squad on a development contract ahead of the 2026–27 season.

== International career ==
A member of the Ireland national under-20 rugby union team grand slam winning side. Whilst playing for Ireland U20s in the U20 Six Nations in 2022 he came on as a second-half replacement against England U20s in March 2022 and scored two tries, including an acrobatic finish in the corner.
