= Bryn Ward =

Irish rugby union player

- Born: 17 July 2004 (age 22)
- Height: 1.85 m (6 ft 1 in)
- Weight: 115 kg (254 lb)
- School: Royal Belfast Academical Institution
- Notable relative(s): Andy Ward (father); Zac Ward (brother)

Rugby union career
- Position: Back row
- Current team: Ulster
Amateur team(s)
Years	Team	Apps	(Points)
2023–	Ballynahinch RFC	15	(5)
Senior career
Years	Team	Apps	(Points)
2025–	Ulster	21	(25)
- Correct as of 3 October 2026
International career
Years	Team	Apps	(Points)
2024	Ireland U20	7	(5)
2026-	Ireland A	1	(0)
2026-	Ireland	1	(0)
- Correct as of 11 July 2026

Bryn Ward (born 17 July 2004) is an Irish rugby union player who plays in the back row for Ulster Rugby. He represented Ireland Under-20 in 2024.

== Early life ==
Ward was educated at Royal Belfast Academical Institution (RBAI). He played schools rugby for RBAI, including involvement in the school's Ulster Schools' Senior Cup-winning campaign in 2023. He played club rugby for Ballynahinch RFC.

== Rugby career ==
Ward was named in Ireland's squad for the 2024 Six Nations Under 20s Championship. He also featured for Ireland at the 2024 World Rugby Under 20 Championship, including selection at openside flanker for the third-place play-off against New Zealand.

In June 2024, he was named as a new entrant to the Ulster Rugby Academy for the 2024–25 season. His first season was disrupted by a knee injury sustained while playing for Ballynahinch. He made his senior Ulster debut in a United Rugby Championship match against the Lions at Ellis Park in October 2025. In January 2026 he was called up as a training panellist for Ireland ahead of the 2026 Six Nations Championship, and to the Ireland 'A' squad for the fixture against England 'A'. He signed his first senior contract with Ulster ahead of the 2026-27 season. He was named the Nevin Spence Young Player of the Year at the 2026 Rugby Players Ireland awards.

He was called up to the Ireland squad for the 2026 Nations Championship Southern Hemisphere Series, after Caelan Doris withdrew through injury. He made his international debut from the bench against Japan on 11 July.

== Personal life ==
Ward is the son of former Ireland international and Ulster player Andy Ward. His older brother, Zac Ward, is also a rugby union player.
