= Zac Ward =

Irish rugby union player

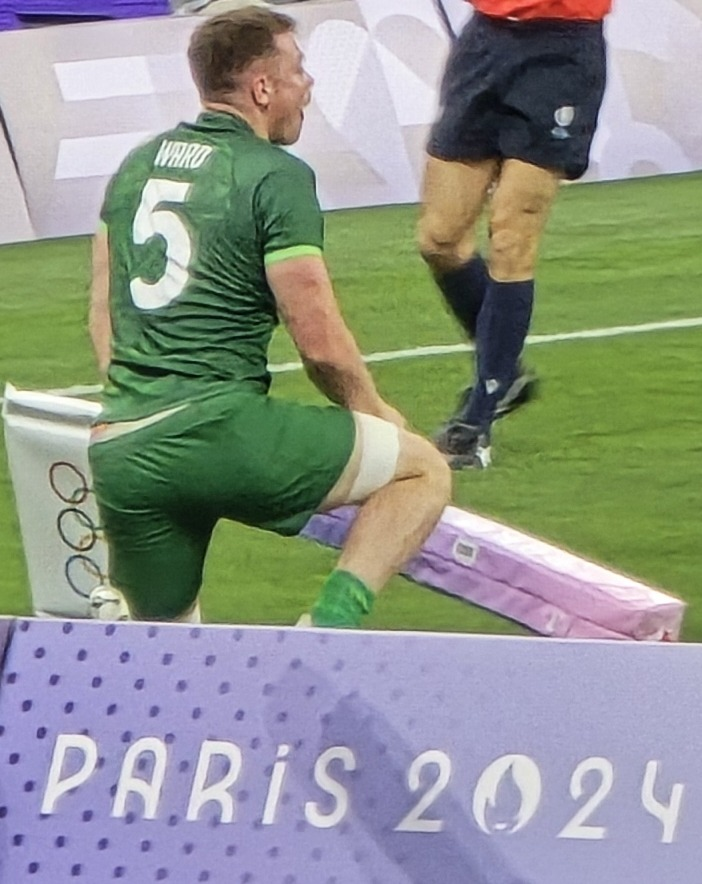
- Ward during Ireland's 2024 Summer Olympic quarter-finals
- Born: 11 December 1998 (age 27) Ballynahinch, County Down
- Height: 1.91 m (6 ft 3 in)
- Weight: 104 kg (229 lb)
- School: Down High School
- Notable relative(s): Andy Ward (father); Bryn Ward (brother)

Rugby union career
- Position(s): Flanker, wing
Amateur team(s)
Years	Team	Apps	(Points)
- Ballynahinch RFC
Senior career
Years	Team	Apps	(Points)
2024–	Ulster	34	(95)
- Correct as of 31 October 2026
International career
Years	Team	Apps	(Points)
2024	Emerging Ireland	2	(5)
2025	Ireland A	2	(0)
- Correct as of 5 February 2026
National sevens team
Years	Team		Comps
2021–2024	Ireland		
Medal record
Men's rugby sevens
Representing Ireland
European Games
Gold medal – first place	2023 Kraków–Małopolska	Team competition

Zac Ward (born 11 December 1998) is an Irish rugby union player who plays wing for Ulster. He formerly represented Ireland internationally at Rugby Sevens, and played for Emerging Ireland in 2024. He is the son of former Ulster captain and Ireland international Andy Ward.

== Early life ==
Ward was born during the quarter-final of Ulster's 1999 Heineken Cup-winning campaign. His father, Andy, who was playing in the match, was substituted and given a police escort from Ravenhill to Lagan Valley Hospital to be with his wife, Wendy, as she gave birth.

By 2004, Ward was already playing age group rugby in Ulster. He attended Down High School, and Hartpury College.

== Career ==
Ward's senior rugby career began with Ballynahinch in the All-Ireland League, where he played flanker.

In November 2021, he was called up to the Ireland Sevens squad for the World Rugby Sevens Series event in Dubai. In May 2023, he featured as Ireland finished sixth at the World Rugby Sevens Series event in London. He was then selected for the Ireland squad for the 2023 European Games held in Kraków in June 2023. He played in the final against Great Britain, with Ireland winning gold in the tournament and qualifying for the 2024 Olympic Games. In May 2024 he won the Men's Sevens Players' Player of the Year in the Rugby Players Ireland Awards. He was selected for the 2024 Paris Olympics, where Ireland made the quarter-finals.

Ward joined Ulster on a trial basis in August 2024. He switched position to wing, and played in two pre-season friendlies, before representing Emerging Ireland in the 2024 Toyota Challenge in South Africa, scoring a try against the Pumas. He made his competitive debut for Ulster in the Champions Cup against Bordeaux in December 2024. Shortly afterwards he signed a three-year contract with Ulster keeping him at the club until 2028.

Ward was called up as a training panellist for Ireland's tour to Georgia and Portugal in the summer of 2025. In October 2025, he was called-up to the Ireland Wolfhounds squad for their match against Spain during the 2025 November internationals, and was subsequently named as a replacement for the match. He was called up to the Ireland squad for the 2026 Nations Championship Southern Hemisphere Series after Tommy O'Brien was ruled out through injury.

== Personal life ==
His brother Bryn Ward is also a professional rugby player.
