= Scott Wilson (rugby union) =

Northern Irish rugby union player

- Born: 6 August 2002 (age 24) Maghaberry, Northern Ireland
- Height: 1.87 m (6 ft 1 1/2 in)
- Weight: 125 kg (19.7 st; 276 lb)
- School: Wallace High School
- University: Queen's University Belfast

Rugby union career
- Position: Prop
Amateur team(s)
| Years | Team | Apps | (Points) |
| 2021-2024 | Queen's University | 2 | (0) |
Senior career
| Years | Team | Apps | (Points) |
| 2023– | Ulster | 60 | (30) |
- Correct as of 31 October 2026
International career
| Years | Team | Apps | (Points) |
| 2022 | Ireland U20 | 6 | (5) |
| 2024 | Emerging Ireland | 2 | (0) |
| 2025- | Ireland A | 2 | (5) |
- Correct as of 05 February 2026

Scott Wilson (born 6 August 2002) is an Irish rugby union player who plays as a prop forward for Ulster Rugby.

== Early life ==
From Maghaberry, he was a neighbour of Irish rugby international Stephen Ferris growing up. Wilson was a season-ticket holder at Ulster Rugby from the age of eight years-old. He played rugby at Wallace High School, and was part of the team that shared the Ulster Schools' Cup with The Royal School, Armagh after the final was called off due to the COVID-19 pandemic. He studied at Queen's University Belfast. He played for Queen's in the second tier of the All Ireland League prior to his call-up to the Ulster first team.

== Career ==
A prop forward, he missed time during the 2022-23 season with three surgeries, one on his elbow and two on his ankle, and a concussion. He made his debut for Ulster Rugby against Munster Rugby on 10 November 2023. He scored his first try for Ulster in the last-16 win away to Montpellier Hérault Rugby in the EPCR Challenge Cup on 7 April 2024. He signed a new contract with Ulster in April 2024.

== International career ==
He was a Grand Slam winner with Ireland in the Under-20 Six Nations in 2022. He was called up to the senior Ireland squad ahead of their summer 2025 tests against Georgia and Portugal. In October 2025, he was called-up to the Ireland Wolfhounds squad for their match against Spain during the 2025 November internationals, and was subsequently named as a replacement for the match.

== Style of play ==
Wilson has been described as a "strong scrummager and ball carrier". He was described, during his debut season, as "one of the most exciting prospects we’ve had in a long time" by Ulster skipper Iain Henderson.
