= Sean Reffell =

English rugby union player

- Born: Sean Daniel Reffell; 4 November 1998 (age 28) Bromley, London, England
- Height: 1.80 m (5 ft 11 in)
- Weight: 102 kg (16 st 1 lb)
- School: Langley Park Boys School

Rugby union career
- Position: Flanker
Senior career
Years	Team	Apps	(Points)
2017–2022	Saracens	40	(15)
2022–26	Ulster	16	(0)
- Correct as of 17 April 2026
International career
Years	Team	Apps	(Points)
2017	England U18	2	(0)
2018	England U20	1	(0)

Sean Reffell (born 4 November 1998) is an English rugby union player who plays as a flanker for United Rugby Championship side Ulster.

== Rugby career ==
Reffell came through the academy of Saracens and made his club debut in the Anglo-Welsh Cup against Sale Sharks in November 2017. In 2017 he also made his debut for the England under-18 side and would go on to make an appearance for England under-20 in a defeat against Scotland during the 2018 Six Nations Under 20s Championship.

Reffell holds the Saracens club record for most tackles in a game with 39 against Worcester Warriors during a Premiership Rugby Cup semi-final in March 2019. He came off the bench in the final of the competition which they lost to Northampton Saints. After Saracens were relegated in 2020 for salary cap breaches, Reffell featured in the RFU Championship play-off victory over Ealing Trailfinders which saw Saracens gain promotion and an immediate return to the top flight. His performances during this campaign saw him win their young player of the season award for 2020–21.

Reffell is an Irish-qualified player and joined Ulster for the 2022–23 season. He made 42 tackles in a single game, on 1 January 2023 against Munster. He left Ulster at the end of the 2025-26 season.
