= 2024–25 Ulster Rugby season =

Ulster Rugby
- 2024–25 season
- Head Coach: Richie Murphy
- General Manager: Bryn Cunningham
- Captain: Iain Henderson
- United Rugby Championship: 14th
- Champions Cup: Round of 16
- Top try scorer: League: Jude Postlethwaite, Jacob Stockdale (5); All: Nick Timoney (7)
- Top points scorer: League: Nathan Doak (56); All: Nathan Doak (82)
- Highest home attendance: 16,491
- Lowest home attendance: 11,533
- Average home attendance: 13,023
Home colours	Away colours	Third colours

The 2024–25 season was Ulster Rugby's 31st season since the advent of professionalism in rugby union, and Richie Murphy's first full season as head coach of the men's senior team. New signings included South African wing Werner Kok, Irish-qualified New Zealand out-half Aidan Morgan, and former Ireland Sevens wing Zac Ward.

Ulster's men finished 14th in the fourth United Rugby Championship, failing to qualify for the European Rugby Champions Cup for the first time, and 3rd in its Irish Shield competition. In Europe, Ulster took part in the 2024-25 European Rugby Champions Cup, qualifying as 16th seed from the pool stage, before going out in the round of 16 to Bordeaux. Nick Timoney was named player of the year.

Cormac Izuchukwu made his debut for Ireland, with Iain Henderson, Rob Herring, Tom O'Toole, Stuart McCloskey and Jacob Stockdale also being capped. Izuchukwu, Harry Sheridan, Scott Wilson, Jack Murphy, Jude Postlethwaite and Zac Ward were selected for Emerging Ireland.

Ulster's men's 'A' team took part in the 'A' Interprovincial Championship, finishing second behind Leinster 'A'.

In the women's game, Ulster took part in the IRFU Women's Interprovincial Series, finishing fourth. Claire Boles was player if the year. Boles, Sadhbh McGrath, Fiona Tuite and Brittany Hogan represented Ireland. Ulster supplied seven players to the Wolfhounds and two to the Clovers in the 2024-25 Celtic Challenge; the Wolfhounds won the competition for the second time, and the Clovers came second.

Ulster Rugby drew an average home attendance of 13,196 in the 2024-25 URC season.

== Men's season ==
=== Personnel changes ===
Richie Murphy, who joined as interim head coach last season following the departure of Dan McFarland, was confirmed as head coach on a two-year contract. Skills coach Craig Newby left for Ealing Trailfinders. Jimmy Duffy, former assistant coach at Connacht, Ireland under-20s and Western Force, joined as forwards coach. Incumbent forwards coach Roddy Grant left by mutual consent. Sam Dodge arrived as head of athletic performance. Hugh McCaughey was confirmed as chief executive officer until the end of 2025.

Centre Angus Curtis retired partway through last season on medical advice after a series of concussions. Prop Steven Kitshoff cut short his stay at Ulster and returned to the Stormers, where he was joined by flanker Dave Ewers. Out-half Billy Burns joined Munster on a one-year contract. Centre Luke Marshall retired. Utility back Will Addison signed for his former club, Sale Sharks. Fullback Shea O'Brien, prop James French and flanker Greg Jones were released. Prop Marty Moore retired on medical grounds at the start of the season.

New signings included wing Werner Kok from the Sharks, and Irish-qualified out-half Aidan Morgan from the Hurricanes. Scrum-half Michael McDonald returned from his season-long loan at Connacht. Academy prop Scott Wilson, flankers Lorcan McLoughlin and James McNabney and out-half James Humphreys joined the senior squad on development contracts. Ireland Sevens player Zac Ward joined on a trial basis, converted to wing, and signed a three-year contract in December. Prop Corrie Barrett, formerly of Doncaster Knights, joined on a one-year contract after a successful pre-season trial.

Seven players joined the academy: centres Sam Berman, Wilhelm de Klerk and Jonny Scott, scrum-half Clarke Logan, flankers James McKillop and Bryn Ward, and out-half Jack Murphy. Prop George Saunderson left the academy after retiring from the game on medical grounds.

=== Summer internationals ===
Six Ulstermen were named in Andy Farrell's Ireland squad for their two-match tour of South Africa in July 2024: Rob Herring, Tom O'Toole, Nick Timoney, Stuart McCloskey, Jacob Stockdale and the uncapped Cormac Izuchukwu. Nathan Doak was called up after Craig Casey was injured in the first test. Herring and McCloskey appeared from the bench in the second test.

Cormac Izuchukwu, Harry Sheridan, Scott Wilson, Jack Murphy, Jude Postlethwaite and Zac Ward were selected for Emerging Ireland for the 2024 Toyota Challenge in South Africa.

=== Domestic season: first block ===
Ulster won their first pre-season friendly at home against Benetton, and lost their second the following Saturday away to Exeter Chiefs.

The opening match of the URC season was at home against defending champions Glasgow Warriors. Replacement scrum-half David Shanahan gave Ulster a win with a last-minute try. Prop Corrie Barrett, out-half Aidan Morgan, and replacements hooker James McCormick and wing Werner Kok made their Ulster debuts. Former Connacht hooker Tadgh McElroy was signed as short-term injury cover, and travelled with the squad on two-week mini-tour to South Africa. Ulster lost to both the Lions in Johannesburg and the Bulls in Pretoria. Academy lock Charlie Irvine made his debut from the start against the Bulls, as did hooker McElroy and out-half James Humphreys from the bench. Prop Bryan O'Connor signed from Bedford Blues. Ulster then returned home and defeated Connacht and Ospreys, before losing away to Cardiff.

=== Autumn internationals ===
In the 2024 end-of-year rugby union internationals, Rob Herring, Tom O'Toole and Iain Henderson came off the bench for Ireland against New Zealand on 8 November. Herring appeared from the bench against Argentina on 15 November. Jacob Stockdale and international debutant Cormac Izuchukwu started, and Tom O'Toole, Iain Henderson and Stuart McCloskey came off the bench against Fiji on 23 November. O'Toole and Henderson appeared off the bench against Australia on 30 November.

=== Domestic season: second block ===
Ulster lost narrowly at home to Leinster in the URC on 29 November, then opened their Champions Cup campaign with heavy away defeats to Toulouse and Bordeaux. Wing Zac Ward and replacement wing Rory Telfer made their debuts against Bordeaux. Between the two matches, wing Aaron Sexton left to join the NFL International Player Pathway. Two interpros followed - a narrow home defeat to Munster, in which out-half Jack Murphy made his debut from the bench, and a win away against Connacht, in which academy centre Wilhelm de Klerk made his debut from the bench, before the Champions Cup resumed with an away defeat to Leicester Tigers. Former Ulster wing Rob Lyttle re-signed as short-term injury cover, and appeared in the final pool game, a bonus point home win against Exeter Chiefs, which was enough to qualify for the round of sixteen. The final match before the Six Nations was a lacklustre home defeat to Zebre.

=== Six Nations break ===
Rob Herring, Iain Henderson and Cormac Izuchukwu were selected for the Ireland quad for the 2025 Six Nations. James McNabney was called up as a development player. Henderson came off the bench in the opening home win against England. No Ulster players were selected for the second match, an away win against Scotland.

Former Ulster academy lock Matthew Dalton signed in January 2025 following a successful trial, and academy locks Joe Hopes and Charlie Irvine signed development contracts. Defence coach Jonny Bell left Ulster in February, with Willie Faloon joining the senior coaching team in his place.

During the Six Nations break, Ulster played a friendly against the touring Queensland Reds, losing 31–38. James Hume, Stuart McCloskey and Jacob Stockdale appeared on their return from injury. In the URC, they lost away to Benetton, and beat Scarlets at home, with debuts for scrum-half Conor McKee and loosehead prop Sam Crean, on loan from Saracens.

=== Domestic season: final block ===
After the six nations ended, Ulster came from behind to defeat Dragons away, and won a third game in a row by defeating the Stormers at home, in a game that marked Stuart McCloskey's 200th appearance for the province, and a try-scoring return from 11 months out injured for Robert Baloucoune. There then followed five straight defeats: one in the round of 16 of the Champions Cup, away to Bordeaux, and four in the URC, away to Leinster, home to the Sharks, away to Munster, and away to Edinburgh. Ulster finished 14th in the URC, failing to qualify for the Champions Cup for the first time. Next season they will play in the EPCR Challenge Cup.

== Women's season ==
Ulster's senior women's team took part in the Interprovincial series, a single round robin with finals. Ulster finished fourth, with a draw and three defeats overall.

In the third Celtic Challenge, there were two Irish teams, the Wolfhounds and the Clovers. Eight Ulster players featured for the Wolfhounds: prop Sophie McAllister, hooker Maeve Clenaghan, lock Fiona Tuite, back row forwards Claire Boles and Brittany Hogan, scrum-half Rachael McIlroy, out-half/fullback Lauren Farrell-McCabe and wing/centre Ella Durkan. Two Ulster players appeared for the Clovers, props Sophie Barrett and Sadhbh McGrath. The Wolfhounds were champions for a second time, with the Clovers finishing second.

Five Ulster players were selected for the Ireland squad for the 2025 Women's Six Nations Championship: props Sophie Barrett and Sadhbh McGrath; lock Fiona Tuite; and back row forwards Claire Boles and Brittany Hogan. Hogan and Tuite appeared in all five matches, with McGrath and Boles featuring in two.

== Awards ==
=== Ulster Rugby Awards ===
The Ulster Rugby Awards for the 2024–25 season were presented at the Crowne Plaza Hotel, Belfast, on 22 May 2025. Winners were:

==== Men's and boy's awards ====
- Player of the year: Nick Timoney
- Personality of the year: Alan O'Connor
- Rugby writers's player of the year: Jacob Stockdale
- Supporters' club player of the year: Nick Timoney
- Young men's player of the year: James McNabney
- Club player of the year: Conor Rankin, Ballynahinch RFC
- Boys' schools player of the year: Connor McVicker, Belfast Royal Academy
- Boys' youth player of the year: Caiden Slaughter, Carrick RFC

==== Women's and girls' awards ====
- Women's player of the year: Claire Boles
- Young women's player of the year: Lucy Thompson
- Girls' schools player of the year: Mary-Rose O'Donnell, St Louis Grammar School, Ballymena
- Girls' youth player of the year: Cara McLean, Larne RFC

==== Club/community awards ====
- Club of the year: City of Armagh RFC
- Referee of the year: Alana Kerr
- Dorrington B. Faulkner award (services to rugby): Richard Black, City of Armagh RFC

== Men's personnel ==
=== Staff ===
Position	Name	Nationality
Chief executive officer	Hugh McCaughey	Ireland
Operations director	Bryn Cunningham	Ireland
Head coach	Richie Murphy	Ireland
Assistant coach	Dan Soper	New Zealand
Defence coach (until 4 February 2025)	Jonny Bell	Ireland
Defence coach (from 4 February 2025)	Willie Faloon	Ireland
Forwards coach	Jimmy Duffy	Ireland
Head of Athletic Performance	Sam Dodge	Wales
Academy manager	Gavin Hogg	Ireland
Elite performance development officer	Willie Faloon	Ireland
Elite performance development officer	Neil Doak	Ireland

=== Senior squad ===
The below squad reflects the confirmed joiners and leavers for the 2024–25 season. Amendments to the squad will be made as-and-when announcements are confirmed by the province.

==== Players in ====
- (Ireland) Corrie Barrett from (England) Doncaster Knights
- (South Africa) Werner Kok from (South Africa) Sharks
- (Ireland) Michael McDonald from (Ireland) Connacht (returning from season-long loan)
- (Ireland) Tadgh McElroy from (Ireland) Connacht (short-term injury cover)
- (New Zealand) Aidan Morgan from (New Zealand) Hurricanes
- (Ireland) Bryan O'Connor from (England) Bedford Blues
- Zac Ward from Ireland Sevens (trial, later permanent)
- (Ireland) Rob Lyttle from (Ireland) Banbridge (short-term injury cover)
- (Ireland) Matthew Dalton from (France) Soyaux Angoulême (following successful trial)
- (England) Sam Crean from (England) Saracens (loan, short-term injury cover)

==== Promoted from academy ====
- (Ireland) James Humphreys
- (Ireland) Lorcan McLoughlin
- (Ireland) James McNabney
- (Ireland) Scott Wilson

==== Players out ====
- (Ireland) Will Addison to (England) Sale Sharks
- (Ireland) Billy Burns to (Ireland) Munster
- (Zimbabwe) Angus Curtis retired
- (Zimbabwe) Dave Ewers to (South Africa) Stormers
- (Ireland) James French to (England) Cornish Pirates
- (Ireland) Greg Jones released
- (South Africa) Steven Kitshoff retired
- (Ireland) Luke Marshall retired
- (Ireland) Tadgh McElroy to (England) Sale Sharks
- (Ireland) Marty Moore retired
- (Ireland) Shea O'Brien released
- (Ireland) Aaron Sexton to (United States) NFL International Player Pathway
- (Ireland) Michael McDonald to (Australia) Waratahs (short term injury cover)

Ulster Rugby squad (Note: Taking into account signings and departures ahead of 2024–25 season as listed on List of 2024–25 United Rugby Championship transfers.)
**Props**: (Ireland) **Tom O'Toole** (17 apps, 12 starts, 10 pts, 1 (red card) ); (Ireland) Andrew Warwick (17 apps, 12 starts, 5 pts); (Ireland) Scott Wilson (18 apps, 10 starts, 5 pts, 1 (yellow card) ); (Ireland) **Eric O'Sullivan** (13 apps, 8 starts, 5 pts); (Ireland) Corrie Barrett (9 apps, 2 starts, 15 pts, 1 (yellow card) ); (Ireland) Callum Reid (12 apps, 2 starts, 5 pts); (Ireland) Jacob Boyd (1 app, 1 start); (England) Sam Crean* ^{ST} (2 apps) (Note: Sam Crean joined the squad as injury cover before URC round 12, and returned to Saracens ahead of URC round 14.); (Ireland) Bryan O'Connor (2 apps); **Hookers**: (Ireland) **Rob Herring** (13 apps, 12 starts, 15 pts, 1 (yellow card) ); (Ireland) John Andrew (11 apps, 5 starts, 5 pts); (Ireland) James McCormick (10 apps, 5 starts, 15 pts); (Ireland) **Tom Stewart** (9 apps, 1 start); (Ireland) Tadgh McElroy ^{ST} (2 apps) (Note: Tadgh McElroy joined squad as injury cover for URC round 2, left for Sale Sharks after round 5.); **Locks**: (Ireland) Alan O'Connor (16 apps, 12 starts, 5 pts); (Ireland) **Kieran Treadwell** (20 apps, 12 starts); (Ireland) Cormac Izuchukwu (13 apps, 12 starts, 20 pts); (Ireland) **Iain Henderson** (c) (11 apps, 9 starts, 5 pts); (Ireland) Harry Sheridan (13 apps, 4 starts, 10 pts, 3 (yellow card) ); (Ireland) Matthew Dalton (5 apps, 2 starts, 5 pts) (Note: Matthew Dalton signed in January 2025 following a successful trial); (Ireland) Charlie Irvine (1 app, 1 start)	**Back row**: (Ireland) **Nick Timoney** (21 apps, 19 starts, 35 pts, 2 (yellow card) ); (Ireland) David McCann (22 apps, 17 starts, 25 pts, 4 (yellow card) ); (Ireland) James McNabney (17 apps, 14 starts, 5 pts); (Ireland) Matty Rea (13 apps, 8 starts); (Ireland) Marcus Rea (7 apps, 3 starts, 5 pts); (England) Sean Reffell* (3 app, 3 starts); (Ireland) Lorcan McLoughlin (1 app, 1 start); (Ireland) Reuben Crothers (2 apps); **Scrum-halves**: (Ireland) Nathan Doak (22 apps, 15 starts, 81 pts); (Ireland) **John Cooney** (14 apps, 7 starts, 49 pts); (Ireland) David Shanahan (7 apps, 5 pts); (Ireland) Conor McKee (1 app, 1 start); (Ireland) Michael McDonald (Note: Michael McDonald signed for the Waratahs as short term injury cover in March 2025.); **Fly-halves**: (New Zealand) Aidan Morgan* (14 apps, 12 starts, 10 pts); (Ireland) Jack Murphy (13 apps, 11 starts, 46 pts); (Ireland) James Humphreys (4 apps, 4 pts); (Ireland) Jake Flannery (4 apps)	**Centres**: (Ireland) Jude Postlethwaite (18 apps, 14 starts, 30 pts); (Ireland) **Stuart McCloskey** (14 apps, 14 starts, 5 pts, 1 (yellow card) ); (Ireland) Stewart Moore (16 apps, 11 starts, 15 pts, 1 (yellow card) ); (Ireland) Ben Carson (11 apps, 9 starts, 20 pts); (Ireland) **James Hume** (4 apps, 4 starts, 5 pts); (South Africa) Wilhelm de Klerk* (2 apps); **Wings**: (South Africa) Werner Kok (16 apps, 14 starts, 15 pts, 1 (yellow card) ); (Ireland) **Jacob Stockdale** (13 apps, 13 starts, 25 pts, 1 (yellow card) ); (Ireland) Zac Ward (10 apps, 8 starts, 15 pts); (Ireland) **Robert Baloucoune** (2 app, 2 start, 5 pts); (Ireland) Ben Moxham (2 apps); (Ireland) Rob Lyttle ^{ST} (Note: Rob Lyttle joined as short-term injury cover ahead of Round 4 of the Champions Cup) (2 apps); (Ireland) Aaron Sexton (Note: Aaron Sexton left the squad to join the NFL International Player Pathway in December 2024); **Fullbacks**: (Ireland) **Michael Lowry** (21 apps, 19 starts, 5 pts); (Ireland) Ethan McIlroy (5 apps, 5 starts); (Ireland) Rory Telfer (4 apps, 1 start)
(c) denotes the team captain, **Bold** denotes internationally capped players.^{*} denotes players qualified to play for Ireland on residency or dual nationality. Italics denote academy players. ^{ST} denotes a short-term signing.

=== Academy squad ===
==== Players in ====
- (Ireland) Sam Berman from (Ireland) Terenure College
- (South Africa) Wilhelm de Klerk* from (Ireland) Dublin University
- (Ireland) Clarke Logan from (Ireland) Coleraine Grammar School
- (Ireland) James McKillop from (Ireland) Queen's University
- (Ireland) Jack Murphy from (Ireland) Clontarf
- (Ireland) Jonny Scott from (Ireland) Banbridge
- (Ireland) Bryn Ward from (Ireland) Ballynahinch

==== Players out ====
- (Ireland) George Saunderson (retired on medical advice)

Ulster Rugby academy squad
**Props**: (Ireland) Jack Boal **(2)**; (Ireland) Jacob Boyd **(2)**; (Ireland) Cameron Doak **(2)**; **Hookers**: (Ireland) Zac Solomon **(2)**; (England) Henry Walker* **(2)**; **Locks**: (Ireland) Joe Hopes **(3)**; (Ireland) Charlie Irvine **(2)**	**Back row**: (Ireland) Tom Brigg **(2)**; (Ireland) James McKillop **(1)**; (Ireland) Josh Stevens **(2)**; (Ireland) Bryn Ward **(1)**; **Scrum-halves**: (Ireland) Clarke Logan **(1)**; **Fly-halves**: (Ireland) Jack Murphy **(1)**	**Centres**: (Ireland) Sam Berman **(1)**; (South Africa) Wilhelm de Klerk* **(1)**; (Ireland) Jonny Scott **(1)**; **Back three**: (Ireland) Rory Telfer **(3)**; (Ireland) Ethan Graham **(2)**; (Ireland) Lukas Kenny **(2)**; (Ireland) Ben McFarlane **(2)**
Number in brackets indicates players stage in the three-year academy cycle.^{*} denotes players qualified to play for Ireland on residency or dual nationality. Players and their allocated positions from the Ulster Rugby website.

== Men's competitions and results ==
=== Season record ===
Competition	Played	Won	Drawn	Lost	PF	PA	PD	TF	TA
2024-25 Champions Cup	5	1	0	4	133	206	-73	20	30
2024-25 URC	18	7	0	11	414	506	-92	59	72
Total	23	8	0	15	547	712	-165	96	122

=== Home attendance ===
End of season (May 2025)

Domestic League						European Cup						Total		
League	Fixtures	Total Attendance	Average Attendance	Highest	Lowest	League	Fixtures	Total Attendance	Average Attendance	Highest	Lowest	Fixtures	Total Attendance	Average Attendance
2024–25 United Rugby Championship	9	118,582	13,176	16,491	11,533	2024–25 European Rugby Champions Cup	2	24,669	12,335	13,093	11,576	11	143,251	13,023

=== 2024–25 United Rugby Championship ===
==== Table ====
Pos	Team	Pld	W	D	L	PF	PA	PD	TF	TA	TB	LB	Pts	Qualification
1	Leinster (CH)	18	16	0	2	542	256	+286	79	35	11	1	76	Qualifies for home URC quarter-final; Qualification for the 2025–26 Champions Cup
2	Bulls (RU)	18	14	0	4	542	361	+181	71	44	9	3	68	Qualifies for home URC quarter-final; Qualification for the 2025–26 Champions Cup
3	Sharks	18	13	0	5	436	402	+34	55	59	7	3	62	Qualifies for home URC quarter-final; Qualification for the 2025–26 Champions Cup
4	Glasgow Warriors	18	11	0	7	468	327	+141	70	40	10	5	59	Qualifies for home URC quarter-final; Qualification for the 2025–26 Champions Cup
5	Stormers	18	10	0	8	507	418	+89	66	57	11	4	55	Qualifies for URC quarter-final; Qualification for the 2025–26 Champions Cup
6	Munster	18	9	0	9	444	429	+15	67	59	11	4	51	Qualifies for URC quarter-final; Qualification for the 2025–26 Champions Cup
7	Edinburgh	18	8	1	9	471	407	+64	66	57	9	6	49	Qualifies for URC quarter-final; Qualification for the 2025–26 Champions Cup
8	Scarlets	18	9	1	8	427	382	+45	50	52	6	4	48	Qualifies for URC quarter-final; Qualification for the 2025–26 Champions Cup
9	Cardiff	18	8	1	9	409	477	−68	63	65	10	3	47	Qualification for the 2025–26 Challenge Cup
10	Benetton	18	9	1	8	393	478	−85	50	65	7	1	46	Qualification for the 2025–26 Challenge Cup
11	Lions	18	8	0	10	402	440	−38	53	60	5	3	40	Qualification for the 2025–26 Challenge Cup
12	Ospreys	18	7	1	10	437	454	−17	60	63	6	4	40	Qualification for the 2025–26 Challenge Cup
13	Connacht	18	6	0	12	420	472	−52	64	62	9	6	39	Qualification for the 2025–26 Challenge Cup
14	Ulster	18	7	0	11	414	506	−92	59	72	5	5	38	Qualification for the 2025–26 Challenge Cup
15	Zebre Parma	18	5	1	12	302	503	−201	38	72	3	4	29	Qualification for the 2025–26 Challenge Cup
16	Dragons	18	1	0	17	335	637	−302	43	92	1	4	9	Qualification for the 2025–26 Challenge Cup

Source: UnitedRugby.com
Rules for classification: Tiebreakers for teams tied on points: 1) Number of matches won 2) The difference between points for and points against 3) The number of tries scored 4) The most points scored 5) The difference between tries for and tries against 6) The fewest red cards received 7) The fewest yellow cards received.

2024–25 United Rugby Championship Regional Shield Pools
(Ireland) Irish Shield
	Team	P	W	D	L	PF	PA	PD	TF	TA	TBP	LBP	Pts	Pos overall
1	(Ireland) Leinster (S)	6	6	0	0	175	80	+95	26	11	5	0	29	1
2	(Ireland) Munster	6	4	0	2	144	150	–6	22	22	4	0	20	6
3	(Ireland) Ulster	6	2	0	4	125	162	–37	16	26	1	2	11	14
4	(Ireland) Connacht	6	0	0	6	115	167	–52	18	23	3	3	6	13
If teams are level at any stage, tiebreakers are applied in the following order: 1. number of matches won 2. the difference between points for and points against 3. the number of tries scored 4. the most points scored 5. the difference between tries for and tries against 6. the fewest red cards received 7. the fewest yellow cards received
Green background indicates teams currently leading the regional shield. Upon the conclusion of the regular season, these teams win their respective regional shields. (S) : URC Shield champion

==== Results ====
21 September 2024	Ulster (Ireland)	20-19	(Scotland) Glasgow Warriors (1 BP)	Ravenhill Stadium, Belfast
19:45	Try: Morgan 18'; McCann 72'; Shanahan 84'; Con: N. Doak 19'; Pen: N. Doak 16'	Report; Match centre Player of the match: David Shanahan	Try: Matthews 5'; Venter 25'; Steyn 74'; Con: Jordan 26'; Hastings 75'; Cards: Jordan (yellow card) 57'; Gray (yellow card) 66'	Attendance: 11,533; Referee: Adam Jones
Ulster lineup: 1. Eric O'Sullivan, 2. John Andrew, 3. Corrie Barrett, 4. Iain Henderson (c), 5. Kieran Treadwell, 6. James McNabney, 7. David McCann, 8. Nick Timoney, 9. Nathan Doak, 10. Aidan Morgan, 11. Jacob Stockdale, 12. Jude Postlethwaite, 13. Stewart Moore, 14. Michael Lowry, 15. Ethan McIlroy.; Replacements: 16. James McCormick (for Andrew 66'), 17. Andrew Warwick (for O'Sullivan 45'), 18. Tom O'Toole (for Barrett 45'), 19. Harry Sheridan (for Henderson 57'), 20. Cormac Izuchukwu (for Treadwell 52'), 21. David Shanahan (for Doak 53'), 22. James Humphreys, 23. Werner Kok (for S. Moore 58').				Attendance: 11,533; Referee: Adam Jones

28 September 2024	(1 BP) Lions (South Africa)	35-22	(Ireland) Ulster (1 BP)	Ellis Park Stadium, Johannesburg
12:45	Try: Maxwane 10'; Horn 34'; Marais 46'; Van Wyk 49'; Wolhuter 79'; Con: Wolhuter (2) 35' 51'; Pen: Wolhuter (2) 14' 57'	Report; Match centre	Try: Cooney 43'; Morgan 42'; Kok 59'; Barrett 77'; Con: N. Doak 78'	Attendance: 2,194; Referee: Sam Grove-White
Ulster lineup: 1. Andrew Warwick, 2. John Andrew, 3. Tom O'Toole, 4. Alan O'Connor (c), 5. Kieran Treadwell, 6. Matty Rea, 7. Sean Reffell, 8. Nick Timoney, 9. John Cooney, 10. Aidan Morgan, 11. Jacob Stockdale, 12. Stuart McCloskey, 13. Stewart Moore, 14. Werner Kok, 15. Ethan McIlroy.; Replacements: 16. James McCormick (for Andrew 51'), 17. Eric O'Sullivan (for Warwick 51'), 18. Corrie Barrett (for O'Toole 51'), 19. Iain Henderson (for Treadwell 51'), 20. James McNabney (for O'Connor 61'), 21. Nathan Doak (for Cooney 55'), 22. Michael Lowry (for McIlroy 65'), 23. David McCann (for Rea 51').				Attendance: 2,194; Referee: Sam Grove-White

5 October 2024	(1 BP) Bulls (South Africa)	47-21	(Ireland) Ulster	Loftus Versfeld Stadium, Pretoria
15:00	Try: Arendse 5'; Kriel 13'; Grobbelaar 33'; Moodie 41'; Hanekom 55'; Chamberlain 60'; E. Louw 77'; Con: Chamberlain (3) 6' 14' 34'; Kriel (2) 42' 61'; Johannes 78'	Report; Match centre	Try: Stockdale 8'; Carson 68'; Moore 71'; Con: N. Doak 9'; Humphreys (2) 69' 72'; Cards: Barrett (yellow card) 31'	Attendance: 6,319; Referee: Ben Whitehouse
Ulster lineup: 1. Andrew Warwick, 2. James McCormick, 3. Corrie Barrett, 4. Iain Henderson (c), 5. Charlie Irvine, 6. James McNabney, 7. Sean Reffell, 8. David McCann, 9. Nathan Doak, 10. Aidan Morgan, 11. Jacob Stockdale, 12. Ben Carson, 13. Stewart Moore, 14. Werner Kok, 15. Michael Lowry.; Replacements: 16. Tadgh McElroy (for McCormick 51'), 17. Eric O'Sullivan (for Warwick 49'), 18. Tom O'Toole (for Reffell 31-42', for Barrett 49'), 19. Alan O'Connor (for Henderson 51'), 20. Nick Timoney (for McCann 58'), 21. David Shanahan (for Doak 59'), 22. James Humphreys (for Morgan 61'), 23. Ben Moxham (for Stockdale 58').				Attendance: 6,319; Referee: Ben Whitehouse

12 October 2024	(1 BP) Ulster (Ireland)	32-27	(Ireland) Connacht (2 BP)	Ravenhill Stadium, Belfast
20:00	Try: Andrew 2'; Postlethwaite 20'; Cooney 27'; McCann 49'; Timoney 75'; Con: Cooney (2) 3' 28'; Pen: Cooney 71'; Cards: Kok (yellow card) 32'	Report; Match centre Player of the match: John Cooney	Try: Bolton 10'; Joyce 30'; B. Murphy; Tierney-Martin 60'; Con: Ioane (2) 42' 62'; Pen: Ioane 79'; Cards: J. Murphy (yellow card) 49' (red card) 2'	Attendance: 12,442; Referee: Andrew Brace
Ulster lineup: 1. Andrew Warwick, 2. John Andrew, 3. Tom O'Toole, 4. Iain Henderson (c), Kieran Treadwell, 6. David McCann, 7. Sean Reffell, 8. Nick Timoney, 9. John Cooney, 10. Aidan Morgan, 11. Jacob Stockdale, 12. Jude Postlethwaite, 13. Stewart Moore, 14. Werner Kok, 15. Ethan McIlroy.; Replacements: 16. James McCormick (for Andrew 52'), 17. Callum Reid (for Warwick 66'), 18. Corrie Barrett (for O'Toole 71'), 19. Alan O'Connor (for Henderson 14'), 20. Marcus Rea (for Reffell 60'), 21. Nathan Doak (for Morgan 57'), 22. Ben Carson (for Postlethwaite 32'), 23. Michael Lowry (for Moore 72').				Attendance: 12,442; Referee: Andrew Brace

18 October 2024	(1 BP) Ulster (Ireland)	36-12	(Wales) Ospreys	Ravenhill Stadium, Belfast
19:35	Try: McCormick (2) 4' 50'; Stockdale (2) 9' 50'; Penalty try Marcus Rea 31'; Con: Cooney 33'; N. Doak 65'; Cards: Sheridan (yellow card) 56'	Report; Match centre Player of the match: Jacob Stockdale	Try: Parry 39'; Giles 61'; Con: Edwards 40'; Cards: Hardy (yellow card) 23'	Attendance: 12,272; Referee: Andrea Piardi
Ulster lineup: 1. Eric O'Sullivan, 2. James McCormick, 3. Tom O'Toole, 4. Alan O'Connor (c), 5. Harry Sheridan, 6. Cormac Izuchukwu, 7. Marcus Rea, 8. David McCann, 9. John Cooney, 10. Aidan Morgan, 11. Jacob Stockdale, 12. Stuart McCloskey, 13. Ben Carson, 14. Werner Kok, 15. Michael Lowry.; Replacements: 16. Tadgh McElroy (for McCormick 64'), 17. Callum Reid (for O'Sullivan 56'), 18. Scott Wilson (for O'Toole 51'), 19. Kieran Treadwell (for Sheridan 67'), 20. Matty Rea (for McCann 64'), 21. Nathan Doak (for Cooney 56'), 22. James Humphreys (for Morgan 56'), 23. Jude Postlethwaite (for McCloskey 62').				Attendance: 12,272; Referee: Andrea Piardi

26 October 2024	Cardiff (Wales)	21-19	(Ireland) Ulster (1 BP)	Cardiff Arms Park
	Try: Stephens 48'; Hughes 64'; Young 67'; Con: Sheedy (3) 49' 65' 68'; Cards: Lloyd (yellow card) 23'	Match centre	Try: Izuchukwu 13'; Jude Postlethwaite (2) 17' 23'; Con: N. Doak 14' 18'; Cards: McCann (yellow card) 47'	Attendance: 8,312; Referee: Sam Grove-White
Ulster lineup: 1. Eric O'Sullivan, 2. James McCormick, 3. Tom O'Toole, 4. Iain Henderson, 5. Kieran Treadwell, 6. Cormac Izuchukwu, 7. Nick Timoney, 8. David McCann, 9. Nathan Doak, 10. Aidan Morgan, 11. Michael Lowry, 12. Stuart McCloskey, 13. Jude Postlethwaite, 14. Werner Kok, 15. Ethan McIlroy.; Replacements: 16. John Andrew (for McCormick 78'), 17. Andrew Warwick (for O'Sullivan 51'), 18. Scott Wilson (for O'Toole 52'), 19. Harry Sheridan (for Henderson 24'), 20. Marcus Rea (for Sheridan 70'), 21. John Cooney (for Mogan 69'), 22. Ben Carson (for McCloskey 66'), 23. Ben Moxham.				Attendance: 8,312; Referee: Sam Grove-White

29 November 2024	(1 BP) Ulster (Ireland)	20-27	(Ireland) Leinster (1 BP)	Ravenhill Stadium, Belfast
19:35	Try: Carson (2) 4' 55'; Con: N. Doak (2) 6' 56'; Pen: N. Doak (2) 12' 29'; Cards: Timoney (yellow card) 43'	Report; Match centre	Try: McGrath 9'; Larmour 49'; J. O'Brien 59'; Culhane 72'; Con: R. Byrne (2) 10' 49'; Pen: R. Byrne 16'	Attendance: 16,491; Referee: Eoghan Cross
Ulster lineup: 1. Eric O'Sullivan, 2. James McCormick, 3. Scott Wilson, 4. Alan O'Connor (c), 5. Kieran Treadwell, 6. James McNabney, 7. Nick Timoney, 8. David McCann, 9. Nathan Doak, 10. Aidan Morgan, 11. Michael Lowry, 12. Jude Postlethwaite, 13. Ben Carson, 14. Werner Kok, 15. Stewart Moore.; Replacements: 16. Tom Stewart (for McCormick 53'), 17. Andrew Warwick (for O'Sullivan 53'), 18. Corrie Barrett (for Wilson 53'), 19. Harry Sheridan for Treadwell 67'), 20. Marcus Rea (for Cooney 71'), 21. John Cooney (for Moxham 39'), 22. James Humphreys (for Morgan 65'), 23. Ben Moxham (for Kok 12').				Attendance: 16,491; Referee: Eoghan Cross

20 December 2024	(1 BP) Ulster (Ireland)	19-22	(Ireland) Munster (1 BP)	Ravenhill Stadium, Belfast
19:35	Try: O'Toole 7'; Sheridan 64'; McNabney 75'; Con: Cooney (2) 8' 76'; Cards: O'Toole (red card) 31'	Match centre	Try: Farrell (3) 27' 51' 78'; Daly 66'; Con: Crowley 79'; Cards: R. Scannell (yellow card) 60'	Attendance: 14,313; Referee: Ben Whitehouse
Ulster lineup: 1. Andrew Warwick, 2. Rob Herring, 3. Tom O'Toole, 4. Alan O'Connor (c), 5. Kieran Treadwell, 6. James McNabney, 7. Marcus Rea, 8. David McCann, 9. John Cooney, 10. Aidan Morgan, 11. Zac Ward, 12. Stuart McCloskey, 13. Jude Postlethwaite, 14. Werner Kok, 15. Michael Lowry.; Replacements: 16. John Andrew (for Herring 55'), 17. Eric O'Sullivan (for Warwick 62'), 18. Scott Wilson (for Telfer 34'), 19. Harry Sheridan (for Treadwell 61'), 20. Matty Rea (for Marcus Rea 66'), 21. David Shanahan, 22. Jack Murphy (for McCloskey 38'), 23. Rory Telfer (for Ward 25').				Attendance: 14,313; Referee: Ben Whitehouse

28 December 2024	Connacht (Ireland)	7-17	(Ireland) Ulster	The Sportsground, Galway
19:35	Try: Hansen 35'; Con: Carty 36'	Match centre Player of the match: Nick Timoney	Try: O'Sullivan 10'; Timoney 54'; Con: N. Doak (2) 11' 5'; Pen: N. Doak 14;	Attendance: 6,129; Referee: Andrew Brace
Ulster lineup: 1. Eric O'Sullivan, 2. John Andrew, 3. Scott Wilson, 4. Kieran Treadwell, 5. Cormac Izuchukwu, 6. Matty Rea, 7. Nick Timoney (c), 8. James McNabney, 9. Nathan Doak, 10. Jack Murphy, 11. Rory Telfer, 12. Jude Postlethwaite, 13. Ben Carson, 14. Werner Kok, 15. Michael Lowry.; 16. James McCormick (for Andrew 12-27', 63'), 17. Andrew Warwick (for O'Sullivan 40'), 18. Corrie Barrett (for Wilson 63'), 19. Harry Sheridan (for Treadwell 68'), 20, David McCann (for Rea 49'), 21. John Cooney, 22. Aidan Morgan, 23. Wilhelm de Klerk (for Kok 41').				Attendance: 6,129; Referee: Andrew Brace

26 January 2025	(1 BP) Ulster (Ireland)	14-15	(Italy) Zebre Parma	Ravenhill Stadium, Belfast
17:30	Try: Barrett (2) 56' 75'; Con: N. Doak (2) 56' 76'	Match centre	Try: Stavile 46'; Da Re 49'; Con: Montemauri 50'; Pen: Montemauri 28'; Cards: Stavile (yellow card) 32'	Attendance: 11,792; Referee: Ben Breakspear
Ulster lineup: 1. Eric O'Sullivan, 2. Tom Stewart, 3. Scott Wilson, 4. Harry Sheridan, 5. Kieran Treadwell, 6. Lorcan McLoughlin, 7. Nick Timoney (c), 8. David McCann, 9. John Cooney, 10. Jack Murphy, 11. Zac Ward, 12. Jude Postlethwaite, 13. Ben Carson, 14. Michael Lowry, 15. Stewart Moore.; Replacements: 16. John Andrew (for Stewart 52'), 17. Callum Reid (for O'Sullivan 50'), 18. Corrie Barrett (for Wilson 46'), 19. Alan O'Connor (for Treadwell 47'), 20. Matty Rea (for McLoughlin 66'), 21. Nathan Doak (for Cooney 50'), 22. Jake Flannery (for Murphy 59'), 23. Rob Lyttle (for Ward 76').				Attendance: 11,792; Referee: Ben Breakspear

15 February 2025	(1 BP) Benetton (Italy)	34-19	(Ireland) Ulster	Stadio Monigo, Treviso
17:15	Try: Gallagher 11'; Mendy 38'; Spagnolo 64'; Izekor 79'; Con: Albornoz (4) 12' 39' 65' 80'; Pen: Albornoz (2) 25' 57'	Match centre	Try: N. Doak 3'; Lowry 16'; Stockdale 29'; Con: N. Doak (2) 3' 17'; Cards: McCann (yellow card) 43'; Timoney (yellow card) 56'; Moore (yellow card) 63'
Ulster lineup: 1. Jacob Boyd, 2. Rob Herring, 3. Tom O'Toole, 4. Alan O'Connor (c), 5. Cormac Izuchukwu, 6. Matty Rea, 7. Nick Timoney, 8. David McCann, 9. Nathan Doak, 10. Aidan Morgan, 11. Jacob Stockdale, 12. Stuart McCloskey, 13. James Hume, 14. Michael Lowry, 15. Stewart Moore.; Replacements: 16. John Andrew (for Herring 59'), 17. Bryan O'Connor (for O'Toole 76), 18. Scott Wilson (for Boyd 47'), 19. Kieran Treadwell (for Izuchukwu 20'), 20, Reuben Crothers (for McCann 74'), 21. David Shanahan (for Flannery 69'), 22. Jake Flannery (for Morgan 56'), 23. Jude Postlethwaite (for Lowry 43').

1 March 2025	Ulster (Ireland)	30-28	(Wales) Scarlets (1 BP)	Ravenhill Stadium, Belfast
17:15	Try: Timoney 22'; Reid 53'; A. O'Connor 57'; Con: Murphy (2) 23' 54'; N. Doak 78'; Pen: Murphy (3) 27' 37' 43'	Match centre Player of the match: James McNabney	Try: Page 4'; Nicholas 10'; Fifita 57'; Con: Lloyd (2) 5' 58'; Pen: Lloyd (3) 41' 46' 70'	Attendance: 11,717; Referee: Sam Grove-White
Ulster lineup: 1. Callum Reid, 2. Rob Herring, 3. Scott Wilson, 4. Alan O'Connor (c), 5. Matty Dalton, 6. Matty Rea, 7. Nick Timoney, 8. James McNabney, 9. Conor McKee, 10. Jack Murphy, 11. Jacob Stockdale, 12. Stuart McCloskey, 13. James Hume, 14. Michael Lowry, 15. Stewart Moore.; Replacements: 16. John Andrew (for Herring 66'), 17. Sam Crean (for Reid 64'), 18. Tom O'Toole (for Wilson 47'), 19. Kieran Treadwell (for Dalton 66'), 20. David McCann (for Matty Rea 64'), 21. Nathan Doak (for McKee 58'), 22. Jake Flannery (for Murphy 73'), 23. Jude Postlethwaite (for Hume 54').				Attendance: 11,717; Referee: Sam Grove-White

22 March 2025	(1 BP) Dragons (Wales)	30-34	(Ireland) Ulster (1 BP)	Rodney Parade, Newport
	Try: Owen 0'; Anderson 20'; R. Williams 34'; Con: Reid (3) 1' 21' 35'; Pen: Reid (3) 14' 47' 63'; Cards: Westwood (yellow card) 27'	Report; Match centre Player of the match: Scott Wilson	Try: Hume 9'; Herring (2) 28' 44'; Wilson; Con: N. Doak (3) 10' 29' 44'; Cooney 71'; Pen: Cooney (2) 65' 80'; Cards: Herring (yellow card) 13'	Attendance: 5,950; Referee: Griffin Colby
Ulster lineup: 1. Callum Reid, 2. Rob Herring, 3. Tom O'Toole, 4. Alan O'Connor (c), 5. Matthew Dalton, 6. David McCann, 7. Nick Timoney, 8. James McNabney, 9. Nathan Doak, 10. Jack Murphy, 11. Jacob Stockdale, 12. Stuart McCloskey, 13. James Hume, 14. Michael Lowry, 15. Stewart Moore.; Replacements: 16. John Andrew (for Herring 66'), 17. Sam Crean (for Reid 47'), 18. Scott Wilson (for O'Toole 52'), 19. Kieran Treadwell (for Dalton 63'), 20. Reuben Crothers (for McNabney 69'), 21. John Cooney (for N. Doak 56'), 22. Aidan Morgan, 23. Zac Ward (for Stockdale 69').				Attendance: 5,950; Referee: Griffin Colby

28 March 2025	(1 BP) Ulster (Ireland)	38–34	(South Africa) Stormers (2 BP)	Ravenhill Stadium, Belfast
19:35	Try: Baloucoune 10'; Warwick 28'; Murphy39'; Stockdale 43'; Z. Ward 54'; Moore 65'; Con: Cooney (2)29' 44'; Murphy 55'; N. Doak 66'; Cards: Sheridan (yellow card) 71'	Report; Match centre Player of the match: Jack Murphy	Try: Roos (2) 1' 74'; Loader 6'; Engelbrecht 61'; Con: Feinberg-Mngomezulu (4) 2' 7' 62' 75'; Drop: Feinberg-Mngomezulu (2) 5' 50'; Cards: Feinberg-Mngomezulu (yellow card) 39'; Fouché (red card) 45'	Attendance: 11,672; Referee: Andrea Piardi
Ulster lineup: 1. Andrew Warwick, 2. Rob Herring, 3. Tom O'Toole, 4. Alan O'Connor (c), 5. Kieran Treadwell, 6. Matty Rea, 7. Nick Timoney, 8. David McCann, 9. John Cooney, 10. Jack Murphy, 11. Jacob Stockdale, 12. Stuart McCloskey, 13. Ben Carson, 14. Robert Baloucoune, 15. Michael Lowry.; Replacements: 16. Tom Stewart (for Herring 66'), 17. Callum Reid (for Warwick 49'), 18. Scott Wilson (for O'Toole 49'), 19. Harry Sheridan (for O'Connor 66'), 20. James McNabney (for Matty Rea 51'), 21. Nathan Doak (for Cooney 55'), 22. Stewart Moore (for Carson 45'), 23. Zac Ward (for Baloucoune 47').				Attendance: 11,672; Referee: Andrea Piardi

19 April 2025	(1 BP) Leinster (Ireland)	41-17	(Ireland) Ulster	Aviva Stadium, Dublin
19:35	Try: T. O'Brien 19'; Clarkson 26'; Ringrose 41'; Sheehan (3) 57' 68' 77'; Con: Frawley 27'; Prendergast 69'; Cards: Mangan (yellow card) 51'	Report; Match centre	Try: Izuchukwu 35'; Dalton 72'; Con: Murphy (2) 36' 73'; Pen: Murphy 8'; Cards: McCann (yellow card) 39'	Referee: Gianluca Gnecchi
Ulster lineup: 1. Andrew Warwick, 2. Rob Herring, 3. Tom O'Toole, 4. Alan O'Connor (c), 5. Cormac Izuchukwu, 6. James McNabney, 7. Nick Timoney, 8. David McCann (yellow card) 39', 9. Nathan Doak, 10. Jack Murphy, 11. Jacob Stockdale, 12. Stewart Moore, 13. Jude Postlethwaite, 14. Zac Ward, 15. Michael Lowry.; Replacements: 16. Tom Stewart (for Herring 39'), 17. Callum Reid (for Warwick 38'), 18. Scott Wilson for O'Toole 56'),, 3. Tom O'Toole (for Reid 61'); 19. Matthew Dalton (for Izuchukwu 48'), 20. Kieran Treadwell (for A. O'Connor 48'), 21. John Cooney (for Lowry 20'), 22. Wilhelm de Klerk (for Moore 15'), 23. Matty Rea (for McNabney 60').				Referee: Gianluca Gnecchi

26 April 2025	(1 BP) Ulster (Ireland)	19-22	(South Africa) Sharks	Ravenhill Stadium, Belfast
19:35	Try: Murphy, 7'; Postlethwaite, 10'; Doak, 30'; Con: Murphy, 10', 31'; Cards: Stockdale (yellow card) 33'	Report; Match centre Player of the match: Jacob Stockdale	Try: Mapimpi, 34'; Tshituka, 61'; Julius, 70'; Con: Hendrikse, 62', 71'; Pen: Hendrikse, 78'	Attendance: 16,350; Referee: Ben Whitehouse
Ulster lineup: 1. Andrew Warwick, 2. Rob Herring, 3. Scott Wilson, 4. Alan O'Connor (c), 5. Cormac Izuchukwu, 6. Matty Rea, 7. Nick Timoney, 8. James McNabney, 9. Nathan Doak, 10. Jack Murphy, 11. Zac Ward, 12. Stuart McCloskey, 13. Jude Postlethwaite, 14. Werner Kok, 15. Jacob Stockdale.; Replacements: 16. Tom Stewart (for Herring 70'), 17. Callum Reid (for Warwick 62'), 18. Bryan O'Connor (for Wilson 74'), 19. Matthew Dalton (for Izuchukwu 72'), 20. Kieran Treadwell (for O'Connor 70'), 21. David Shanahan, 22. Aidan Morgan, 23. David McCann (for McNabney 70').				Attendance: 16,350; Referee: Ben Whitehouse

9 May 2025	(1 BP) Munster (Ireland)	38 – 20	(Ireland) Ulster	Thomond Park, Limerick
19:35	Try: Milne 13'; Farrell (2) 24', 55'; Beirne 28'; Scannell 35'; O'Mahony 58'; Con: Crowley (4) 29', 36', 56', 59'; Cards: J. Wycherley (yellow card) 67'	Report; Match centre	Try: McCloskey 6'; Postlethwaite 26'; Con: Murphy (2) 7', 27'; Pen: Murphy (2) 18', 41'; Cards: Wilson (yellow card) 15'; McCloskey (yellow card) 53'	Attendance: 17,684
Ulster lineup: 1. Andrew Warwick, 2. Rob Herring, 3. Scott Wilson, 4. Iain Henderson (c), 5. Cormac Izuchukwu, 6. Matty Rea, 7. Nick Timoney, 8. James McNabney, 9. Nathan Doak, 10 Jack Murphy, 11. Jacob Stockdale, 12. Stuart McCloskey, 13. Jude Postlethwaite, 14. Robert Baloucune, 15. Michael Lowry.; Replacements: 16. Tom Stewart (for Herring 59'), 17. Callum Reid (for Warwick 49'), 18. Tom O'Toole (for Baloucoune 19-26', for Wilson 53')), 19. Alan O'Connor (for Henderson 59'), 20. David McCann (for Matty Rea 48'), 21. David Shanahan (for Doak 63'), 22. Stewart Moore (for McCloskey 68'), 23. Werner Kok (for Baloucoune 60').				Attendance: 17,684

16 May 2025	(1 BP) Edinburgh (Scotland)	47-17	(Ireland) Ulster	Edinburgh Rugby Stadium
19:35	Try: Graham, 9', 74', 81'; Bradbury, 16', 53'; Ashman, 34'; Schoeman, 59'; Con: Thompson, 10', 35', 54', 60'; Healy, 75', 82'; Cards: Graham (yellow card) 25'	Report; Match centre	Try: Penalty try 25'; Kok, 29'; Postlethwaite, 73	Attendance: 7,989; Referee: Craig Evans
Ulster lineup: 1. Andrew Warwick, 2. Rob Herring, 3. Tom O'Toole, 4. Kieran Treadwell, 5. Iain Henderson (c), 6. Cormac Izuchukwu, 7. Nick Timoney, 8. David McCann, 9. Nathan Doak, 10. Jack Murphy, 11. Zac Ward, 12. Stuart McCloskey, 13. Jude Postlethwaite, 14. Werner Kok, 15. Michael Lowry.; Replacements: 16. Tom Stewart (for Herring 53'), 17. Callum Reid (for Warwick 46'), 18. Scott Wilson (for O'Toole 53'), 19. Harry Sheridan (for Henderson 65'), 20. James McNabney (for Treadwell 60'), 21. David Shanahan (for Doak 2-14', 56'), 22. Aidan Morgan (for Murphy 62'), 23. Stewart Moore (for Ward 56').				Attendance: 7,989; Referee: Craig Evans

=== 2024–25 European Rugby Champions Cup ===
==== Pool stage ====
European Rugby Champions Cup Pool 1
Pos	Team	Pld	W	D	L	PF	PA	PD	TF	TA	TB	LB	Pts	Qualification
1	(France) Bordeaux Bègles (1)	4	4	0	0	217	76	+141	33	12	4	0	20	Home Champions Cup round of 16
2	(France) Toulouse (5)	4	4	0	0	225	62	+163	33	9	3	0	19	Home Champions Cup round of 16
3	(England) Leicester Tigers (10)	4	2	0	2	134	149	−15	20	21	3	0	11	Away Champions Cup round of 16
4	(Ireland) Ulster (16)	4	1	0	3	102	163	−61	15	24	1	0	5	Away Champions Cup round of 16
5	(South Africa) Sharks (12CC)	4	1	0	3	76	163	−87	10	23	1	0	5	Away Challenge Cup round of 16
6	(England) Exeter Chiefs	4	0	0	4	83	224	−141	13	34	1	0	1	

Source: EPCR
Rules for classification: Tiebreakers for teams tied on points: 1) Number of matches won; 2) Difference between points for and against; 3) Total number of points for; 4) Aggregate number of points scored in matches between tied teams; 5) Number of matches won excluding the first match, then the second and so on until the tie is settled.

8 December 2024	(1 BP) Toulouse (France)	61-21	(Ireland) Ulster	Stade Ernest Wallon, Toulouse
16:15	Try: Lebel 1' m Ntamack 8' c Meafou (2) 14' c, 40' c Capuozzo (2) 27' c, 56' c Dupont 29' c Chocobares 50' c Penalty try 80'; Con: Ramos (7/8) 9', 15', 28', 30', 40+3', 51', 57'	Report; Match centre	Try: McCormick 12' c Moore 36' c Henderson 67' c Con: Doak (3/3) 12', 36', 68'; Cards: Sheridan (yellow card) 80'	Attendance: 18,837; Referee: Adam Leal
Ulster lineup: 1. Andrew Warwick, 2. James McCormick, 3. Scott Wilson, 4. Alan O'Connor, 5. Harry Sheridan, 6. Matty Rea, 7. Marcus Rea, 8. James McNabney, 9. Nathan Doak, 10. Aidan Morgan, 11. Michael Lowry, 12. Stuart McCloskey, 13. Ben Carson, 14. Werner Kok, 15. Stewart Moore.; Replacements: 16. Rob Herring (for McCormick 40'), 17. Eric O'Sullivan (for Warwick 58'), 18. Tom O'Toole (for Wilson 40'), 19. Iain Henderson (for O'Connor 58'), 20. Cormac Izuchukwu (for Matty Rea 52'), 21. David Shanahan (for Morgan 58'), 22. Jude Postlethwaite (for Carson 20'), 23. Nick Timoney (for McNabney 52')				Attendance: 18,837; Referee: Adam Leal

14 December 2024	Ulster (Ireland)	19-40	(France) Bordeaux (1 BP)	Ravenhill Stadium, Belfast
15:15	Try: Izuchukwu 6' c Timoney 18' c Kok 40' m Con: N. Doak (2) 6' 19'; Cards: McCann (yellow card) 27'	Match centre	Try: Tatafu 2' c Penaud 61' c Petti 67' c Bielle-Biarrey 71' c Boniface 78' m Con: Carbery (2) 3' 62'; Garcia (2) 68' 71'; Cards: Gazzotti (yellow card) 16'; Poirot (yellow card) 31'; Moefana (yellow card) 31'	Attendance: 11,576; Referee: Gianluca Gnecchi
Ulster lineup: 1. Eric O'Sullivan, 2. Rob Herring, 3. Tom O'Toole, 4. Iain Henderson (c), 5. Kieran Treadwell, 6. Cormac Izuchukwu, 7. Nick Timoney, 8. David McCann, 9. Nathan Doak, 10. Aidan Morgan, 11. Zac Ward, 12. Stuart McCloskey, 13. Jude Postlethwaite, 14. Werner Kok, 15. Michael Lowry.; Replacements: 16. John Andrew (for Herring 69'), 17. Andrew Warwick (for O'Sullivan 46'), 18. Scott Wilson (for O'Toole 69'); 19. Harry Sheridan (for Henderson 62'), 20. Marcus Rea (for Izuchukwu 54'), 21. David Shanahan (for N. Doak 54'), 22. James Humphreys (for Morgan 62'), 23. Rory Telfer (for Lowry 76').				Attendance: 11,576; Referee: Gianluca Gnecchi

11 January 2025	(1 BP) Leicester Tigers (England)	38-10	(Ireland) Ulster	Welford Road Stadium, Leicester
20:00	Try: Bassett (3) 17' 41' 60'; Hassell-Collins (2) 48' 51; Perese 62'; Con: Pollard (2) 18' 52'; Steward 61'; Shillcock 63'	Match centre	Try: Timoney 8'; Con: N. Doak 9'; Pen: N. Doak 8'	Attendance: 16,429; Referee: Craig Evans
Ulster lineup: 1. Andrew Warwick, 2. John Andrew, 3. Scott Wilson, 4. Iain Henderson (c), 5. Cormac Izuchukwu, 6. James McNabney, 7. Nick Timoney, 8. David McCann, 9. Nathan Doak, 10. Aidan Morgan, 11. Zac Ward, 12. Jude Postlethwaite, 13. Ben Carson, 14. Werner Kok, 15. Ethan McIlroy, Replacements: 16. James McCormick (for Andrew 55'), 17. Eric O'Sullivan (for Warwick 51'), 18. Corrie Barrett (for Wilson 55'), 19. Kieran Treadwell (for Henderson 51'), 20. Harry Sheridan (for Izuchukwu 62;), 21. John Cooney (for Doak 55'), 22. Jack Murphy (for Morgan 49'), 23. Rory Telfer (for McIlroy 22').				Attendance: 16,429; Referee: Craig Evans

17 January 2025	(1 BP) Ulster (Ireland)	52-24	(England) Exeter Chiefs (1 BP)	Ravenhill Stadium, Belfast
20:00	Try: Izuchukwu (3) 20' 65' 77'; McCann (2) 26' 73'; Timoney 37'; Herring 48'; Carson 67'; Con: N. Doak (2) 21' 49'; Cooney (4) 66' 68' 74' 78'	Match centre Player of the match: Scott Wilson	Try: Brown-Bampoe 2'; Vintcent 13'; Tuima 29'; Wimbush 79'; Con: Haydon-Wood 3'; Skinner 79'	Attendance: 13,093; Referee: Hollie Davidson
Ulster Rugby: 1. Eric O'Sullivan, 2. Rob Herring, 3. Scott Wilson, 4. Iain Henderson (c), 5. Cormac Izuchukwu, 6. James McNabney, 7. Nick Timoney, 8. David McCann, 9. Nathan Doak, 10. Jack Murphy, 11. Michael Lowry, 12. Jude Postlethwaite, 13. Ben Carson, 14. Werner Kok, 15. Stewart Moore.; Replacements: 16. Tom Stewart (for Herring 57'), 17. Callum Reid (for O'Sullivan 60'), 18. Corrie Barrett (for Wilson 56'), 19. Kieran Treadwell (for Henderson 57'), 20. Harry Sheridan (for McNabney 69'), 21. John Cooney (for N. Doak 57'), 22. Jake Flannery (for Moore 49'), 23. Rob Lyttle (for Kok 3').				Attendance: 13,093; Referee: Hollie Davidson

==== Knockout stages ====
Round of 16
1	(France) Bordeaux Bègles	43
16	(Ireland) Ulster	31
8	(France) La Rochelle	24
9	(Ireland) Munster	25
4	(France) Toulon	72
13	(England) Saracens	42
5	(France) Toulouse	38
12	(England) Sale Sharks	15
2	(Ireland) Leinster	62
15	(England) Harlequins	0
7	(Scotland) Glasgow Warriors	43
10	(England) Leicester Tigers	19
3	(England) Northampton Saints	46
14	(France) Clermont	24
6	(France) Castres	39
11	(Italy) Benetton	37

Quarter-finals
1	(France) Bordeaux Bègles	47
9	(Ireland) Munster	29
4	(France) Toulon	18
5	(France) Toulouse	21
2	(Ireland) Leinster	52
7	(Scotland) Glasgow Warriors	0
3	(England) Northampton Saints	51
6	(France) Castres	16

Semi-finals
1	(France) Bordeaux Bègles	35
5	(France) Toulouse	18
2	(Ireland) Leinster	34
3	(England) Northampton Saints	37

Final
1	(France) Bordeaux Bègles	28
3	(England) Northampton Saints	20

Round of 16

Ulster finished their European Rugby Champions Cup pool campaign as the sixteenth and final seed, and were therefore drawn away in the round of 16 to the top seed and eventual champions, Bordeaux-Begles. Despite the seeding gulf, Ulster remained doggedly competitive throughout the last-16 tie, with a 70th minute Janse van Rensburg try effectively ending the contest, despite a late consolation score for Zac Ward.

6 April 2025	Bordeaux (France) (1)	43-31	(16) (Ireland) Ulster	Stade Chaban-Delmas, Bordeaux
12:30	Try: Penaud 6'; Tameifuna 15'; Coleman 20'; Buros40'; Lamothe 50'; Janse van Rensburg 70'; Con: Carbery (4) 6' 16' 21' 41'; Jalibert 71'; Pen: Lucu 46'		Try: O'Toole 28'; McCann 35'; Timoney 55'; Z. Ward (2) 63' 75'; Con: Cooney (2) 29' 37'; N. Doak 76'	Referee: Luke Pearce
Ulster lineup: 1. Andrew Warwick, 2. Rob Herring, 3. Tom O'Toole, 4. Alan O'Connor (c), 5. Kieran Treadwell, 6. James McNabney, 7. Nick Timoney, 8. David McCann, 9. John Cooney, 10. Jack Murphy, 11. Jacob Stockdale, 12. Stuart McCloskey, 13. James Hume, 14. Zac Ward, 15. Michael Lowry.; Replacements: 16. Tom Stewart (for Herring 58'), 17. Callum Reid (for Warwick 44'), 18. Scott Wilson (for O'Toole 56'), 19. Matthew Dalton (for A. O'Connor 56'), 20. Matty Rea (for McCann 65'), 21. Nathan Doak (for Cooney 51'), 22. Aidan Morgan (for Murphy 61'), 23. Stewart Moore (for Hume 40'), 10. Jack Murphy (for McCloskey 73').				Referee: Luke Pearce

=== Friendlies ===
7 September 2024	Ulster (Ireland)	26-19	(Italy) Benetton	Ravenhill Stadium, Belfast
17:00	Try: Telfer; Andrew; Postlethwaite; Shanahan; Con: Doak; Humphreys; Murphy	Report	Try: Ratave; Zanandrea; Gasperini; Con: Smith (2)
Ulster lineup: 1. Eric O'Sullivan, 2. John Andrew, 3. Corrie Barrett, 4. Harry Sheridan, 5. Kieran Treadwell, 6. James McNabney, 7. Sean Reffell, 8. David McCann, 9. Nathan Doak, 10. Aidan Morgan, 11. Aaron Sexton, 12. Jude Postlethwaite, 13. Stewart Moore, 14. Rory Telfer, 15. Michael Lowry (c).; Replacements: Forwards: James McCormick, Henry Walker, Callum Reid, Scott Wilson, Charlie Irvine, James McKillop, Alan O’Connor, Tom Brigg, Marcus Rea. Backs: David Shanahan, Conor McKee, Zac Ward, James Humphreys, Ben Carson, Jack Murphy.

14 September 2024	Exeter Chiefs (England)	31-15	(Ireland) Ulster	Sandy Park, Exeter
17:00	Try: Vermeulen 5'; Feyi-Waboso 42'; Brown-Bampoe 65'; Woodburn 74'; Dunne 77'; Con: Hodge (3) 6' 43' 66'	Report	Try: Sexton 14'; Telfer 49'; Andrew 56'
Ulster lineup: 1. Andrew Warwick, 2. James McCormick, 3. Corrie Barrett, 4. Harry Sheridan, 5. Kieran Treadwell (c), 6. Matty Rea, 7. Marcus Rea, 8. James McNabney, 9. Nathan Doak, 10. Aidan Morgan, 11. Aaron Sexton, 12. Ben Carson, 13. Jude Postlethwaite, 14. Zac Ward, 15. Ethan McIlroy.; Replacements: Forwards: John Andrew (for McCormick 55'), Eric O'Sullivan (for Warwick 40'), Scott Wilson (for Barrett 40'), Henry Walker, Reuben Crothers (for Marcus Rea 55'), Callum Reid, Nick Timoney, Backs: David Shanahan (for Doak 59'), James Humphreys (for Morgan 65'), Stewart Moore (for Carson 21'), Werner Kok (for McIlroy 65'), Ben Moxham (for Sexton 36'), Rory Telfer (for Ward 40').

7 February 2025	Ulster (Ireland)	31-38	(Australia) Queensland Reds	Ravenhill Stadium, Belfast
19:35	Try: Stockdale 18'; McKee 27'; Hume 44'; Lowry 50'; Moore 71'; Con: Morgan (2) 19' 28'; Humphreys 72'	Report	Try: Faessler 8'; Wilson 24'; McDermott 37'; Ryan (2) 58' 61'; Murray 66'; Con: McLaughlin-Phillips (2) 25' 37'; Lynagh (2) 59' 61'	Referee: A. Cole
Ulster lineup: 1. Andrew Warwick, 2. Tom Stewart, 3. Corrie Barrett, 4. Alan O'Connor (c), 5. Matthew Dalton, 6. Matty Rea, 7. Lorcan McLoughlin, 8. David McCann, 9. Conor McKee, 10. Aidan Morgan, 11. Jacob Stockdale, 12. Stuart McCloskey, 13. James Hume, 14. Zac Ward, 15. Jake Flannery.; Replacements: James McCormick (for Stewart 46'), Eric O’Sullivan (for Warwick 46'), Bryan O’Connor (for Barrett 40'), Jacob Boyd (for O'Sullivan 68'); Harry Sheridan (for Dalton 57'), Kieran Treadwell (for O'Connor 57'), Tom Brigg (for McLoughlin 68'), Reuben Crothers (for Matty Rea 57'), David Shanahan (for McKee 46'), James Humphreys (for Morgan 57'), Wilhelm de Klerk (for Hume 46'), Michael Lowry (for Stockdale 40'), Stewart Moore (for McCloskey 40').				Referee: A. Cole

== Women's personnel ==
=== Staff ===
Position	Name	Nationality
Head coach	Murray Houston	Scotland
Scrum and defence coach	Eric O'Sullivan	Ireland
Backs coach	Grace Davitt	Ireland
Team manager	Marianne Breem	Ireland
Athletic development	Kevin Gallagher	Ireland
Physio	Naomi Hamilton	Ireland

=== Squad ===
Ulster Senior Women's Squad
**Props**: (Ireland) Sophie Barrett; (Ireland) Megan Brodie; (Ireland) Bronach Cassidy; (Ireland) Ava Fannin; (Ireland) Ellen Madden; (Ireland) Sophie McAllister; (Ireland) **Sadhbh McGrath**; (Ireland) Sarah Murphy; (Ireland) Aishling O'Connell; **Hookers**: (Ireland) Maebh Clenaghan; (Ireland) Megan Simpson; **Locks**: (Ireland) Brenda Barr; (Ireland) Cara O'Kane; (Ireland) Ellen Patterson; (Ireland) **Fiona Tuite**	**Back row**: (Ireland) **Claire Boles**; (Ireland) India Daley; (Ireland) Chloe Donnan; (Ireland) Christy Hill; (Ireland) Moya Hill; (Ireland) **Brittany Hogan**; (Ireland) Gemma McCamley; (Ireland) Lila O'Molloy; (Ireland) Stacey Sloan; (Ireland) Ruby Starrett; **Scrum-halves**: (Ireland) Laura Cairns; (Ireland) **Kathryn Dane** (c); (Ireland) Rachael McIlroy; **Out-halves**: (Ireland) Lauren Farrell-McCabe; (Ireland) Abby Moyles	**Centres**: (Ireland) Ella Durkan; (Ireland) **Vicky Irwin**; (Ireland) Catherine Martin; (Ireland) Peita McAlister; (Ireland) Kelly McCormill; (Ireland) Tara O'Neill; **Back three**: (Ireland) Megan Edwards; (Ireland) Niamh Marley; (Ireland) Sophie Meeke; (Ireland) Lauren Patterson; (Ireland) Paige Smyth; (Ireland) Lucy Thompson
(c) denotes the team captain, **Bold** denotes internationally capped players. Italics denotes players selected for the 2024–25 Celtic Challenge.

== Women's competitions and results ==
=== 2024 IRFU Women's Interprovincial Series ===
==== Table ====
Pos	Team	Pld	W	D	L	PF	PA	PD	TF	TA	TB	LB	Pts	Qualification or relegation
1	Munster Women	3	3	0	0	90	67	+23	15	11	3	0	15	Qualified for Interprovincial final
2	Leinster Women (C)	3	2	0	1	98	65	+33	16	10	2	0	10	Qualified for Interprovincial final
3	Connacht Women	3	0	1	2	68	92	−24	11	14	2	1	5	Qualified for third/fourth place final
4	Ulster Women	3	0	1	2	61	93	−32	9	16	1	1	4	Qualified for third/fourth place final

First match(es) will be played: Unknown. Source: Unknown
Rules for classification: 1) competition points; 2) match points difference; 3) match points for
(C) Champion

==== Results ====
10 August 2024	(1 BP) Munster (Ireland)	29-22	(Ireland) Ulster (2 BP)	Musgrave Park, Cork
2:30pm	Try: Alana McInerney (3); Chloe Pearse; Chisom Ugwueru; Con: Kate Flannery (2)	Report	Try: Tara O’Neill; India Daley; Lucy Thompson; Brittany Hogan; Con: Vicky Irwin	Referee: Cathal Roddy (IRFU)
Ulster lineup: 1. Gemma McCamley, 2. India Daley, 3. Sophie Barrett, 4. Brenda Barr, 5. Fiona Tuite, 6. Moya Hill, 7. Christy Hill, 8. Brittany Hogan, 9. Kathryn Dane, 10. Vicky Irwin, 11. Lauren Patterson, 12. Tara O'Neill, 13. Peita McAlister, 14. Sophie Meeke, 15. Lauren Farrell-McCabe.; Replacements: 16. Maebh Clenaghan, 17. Bronach Cassidy (for McCamley 40'), 18. Megan Brodie (for C Hill 40+2-49', for Barrett 49-58'), 19. Cara O'Kane (for Tuite 49'), 20. Stacey Sloan (for M Hill 62'), 21. Rachael McIlroy (for Dane 62'), 22. Paige Smyth (for Patterson 62'), 23. Lucy Thompson (for Farrell-McCabe 43').				Referee: Cathal Roddy (IRFU)

17 August 2024	Ulster (Ireland)	25-25	(Ireland) Connacht (1 BP)	Ravenhill Stadium, Belfast
2:30pm	Try: Lucy Thompson; India Daley; Stacey Sloan; Con: Vicky Irwin (2); Pen: Abby Moyles (2)	Report	Try: Méabh Deely (2); Faith Oviawe; Laoise McGonagle; Con: Méabh Deely; Pen: Méabh Deely
Ulster lineup: 1. Bronach Cassidy, 2. India Daley, 3. Sophie Barrett, 4. Brenda Barr, 5. Cara O'Kane, 6. Moya Hill, 7. Maebh Clenaghan, 8. Brittany Hogan, 9. Kathryn Dane (c), 10. Abby Moyles, 11. Peita McAllister, 12. Tara O'Neill, 13 Catherine Martin, 14. Lucy Thompson, 15. Lauren Farrell-McCabe.; Replacements: 16. Christy Hill (for Clenaghan 70'), 17. Megan Brodie (for Cassidy 21-66'), 18. Ava Fannin (for Barrett 35-50'), 19. Gemma McCamley (for O'Kane 62'), 20. Stacey Sloan (for M Hill 50'), 21. Rachael McIlroy (for Dane 50'), 22. Paige Smyth (for Moyles 70'), 23. Vicky Irwin (for O'Neill 57').

24 August 2024	Ulster (Ireland)	14-39	(Ireland) Leinster (1 BP)	Ravenhill Stadium, Belfast
4:45pm	Try: Brittany Hogan (2); Con: Abby Moyles (2)	Report	Try: Robyn O'Connor; Ruth Campbell; Leah Tarpey; Linda Djougang; Emma Tilly; Eimear Corri; Kelly Burke; Con: Jemma Farrell (2); Nikki Caughey
Ulster lineup: 1. Megan Brodie, 2. India Daley, 3. Sophie Barrett, 4. Cara O'Kane, 5. Brenda Barr, 6. Moya Hill, 7. Maebh Clenaghan, 8. Brittany Hogan, 9. Kathryn Dane (c), 10. Abby Moyles, 11. Lauren Patterson, 12. Vicky Irwin, 13. Catherine Martin, 14. Lucy Thompson, 15. Lauren Farrell-McCabe.; Replacements: 16. Christy Hill (for M Hill 62'), 17. Bronagh Cassidy (for Brodie 45'), 18. Ava Fannin (for Barrett 52'), 19. Ellen Patterson (for Barr 75'), 20. Stacey Sloan (for Daley 40'), 21. Rachael McIlroy (for Dane 48'), 22. Megan Edwards (for Thompson 68'), 23. Lucinda Kinghan (for L. Patterson 54').

==== Third/Fourth play-off ====
31 August 2024	Ulster (Ireland)	19-33	(Ireland) Connacht	Ravenhill Stadium, Belfast
2:30pm	Try: Edel McMahon; Faith Oviawe (2); Hannah Clarke; Beibhinn Gleeson; Con: Nicole Fowley (4)	Report	Try: Sophie Barrett; Abby Moyles (2); Con: Abby Moyles
Ulster lineup: 1. Ava Fannin, 2. India Daley, 3. Sophie Barrett, 4. Brenda Barr, 5. Cara O'Kane; 6. Moya Hill, 7. Maebh Clenaghan, 8. Brittany Hogan (c), 9. Rachael McIlroy, 10. Abby Moyles, 11. Megan Edwards, 12. Lucinda Kinghan, 13. Catherine Martin, 14. Lucy Thompson, 15. Lauren Farrell-McCabe.; Replacements: 16. Christy Hill (for Clenaghan 73'), 17. Bronagh Cassidy (for Fannin 32), Fannin (for Barrett 54-65'), 18. Megan Brodie (for Cassidy 54'), 19. Ellen Patterson (for Barr 73'), 20. Stacey Sloan (for M Hill 54'), 21. Paige Smyth (for Thompson 70'), 22. Lauren Patterson (for Edwards 79'), 23. Peita McAlister (for Martin 79').

== See also ==
2024–25 Connacht Rugby season
2024–25 Leinster Rugby season
2024–25 Munster Rugby season
