= 2020–21 Ulster Rugby season =

Ulster Rugby
- 2020–21 season
- Head Coach: Dan McFarland
- Operations Director: Bryn Cunningham
- Captain: Iain Henderson
- Pro14: 2nd in Conference A
- European Rugby Champions Cup: 9th in Pool B
- European Rugby Challenge Cup: Semi-finals
- Pro14 Rainbow Cup: 10th in European Pool
- Top try scorer: League: Marcell Coetzee (9); All: Marcell Coetzee (9)
- Top points scorer: League: John Cooney (139); All: John Cooney (174)
Home colours	Away colours	Third colours

The 2020–21 season was Ulster's 27th season since the advent of professionalism in rugby union, and Dan McFarland's third season as head coach. Iain Henderson was captain. They competed in the Pro14, the Pro14 Rainbow Cup, the European Rugby Champions Cup and the European Rugby Challenge Cup.

The Pro14 season was shortened by the COVID-19 pandemic, with the two South African teams unable to compete and the playoffs reduced to a final between the winners of the two conferences. Ulster finished second in Conference A, qualifying for next season's Champion's Cup. Scrum-half John Cooney was the league's leading scorer with 115 points. Number eight Marcell Coetzee was joint top try scorer with nine, and was named Players' Player of the Season. Ulster led the league in lineouts and scrums. Cooney and Coetzee made the Pro14 Dream Team, as did fullback Michael Lowry and loosehead prop Eric O'Sullivan.

The pool stage of the Champions Cup was reduced to two matches by the pandemic. Ulster lost both and failed to progress to the knockout stage, but were entered into the Challenge Cup, making the semi-finals where they lost to Leicester Tigers. The Pro14 regular season was followed by the Pro14 Rainbow Cup, played between the winners of a European pool and the winners of a pool containing the four ex-Super Rugby South African teams. Ulster finished tenth of twelve in the European pool, and led the competition in scrums.

John Cooney was Ulster's leading scorer with 174 points. Marcell Coetzee was leading try scorer with nine. Lock Alan O'Connor was leading tackler with 242, and was named Ulster's Player of the Year. This was Coetzee's last season with Ulster: he left in April to join the Bulls. Attack coach Dwayne Peel left at the end of the season to become head coach of Scarlets.

== Events ==
=== Personnel changes ===
New arrivals were scrum-half Alby Mathewson, formerly of Munster, and out-half Ian Madigan from Bristol Bears, although due to the delays caused by COVID-19, both had actually made their debuts and the end of the previous season. Academy centre Stewart Moore joined the senior squad on a development contract. Hooker Bradley Roberts was signed from Rainey Old Boys as short-term injury cover, and ended up being kept on permanently.

Wing Angus Kernohan departed for Ealing Trailfinders, hooker Zack McCall, prop Tommy O'Hagan and flanker Clive Ross were released. Six new players joined the academy, including three from Wallace High School - flanker Reuben Crothers, centre Ben Carson and scrum-half Nathan Doak - as well as Down High School scrum-half Lewis Finlay, Ireland Sevens lock Cormac Izuchukwu and Dalriada School hooker James McCormick.

=== Pre-season ===
Due to the mid-season break during the 2019–20 season caused by the COVID-19 pandemic, the 2020–21 season started later than usual. The two South African teams, the Cheetahs and Southern Kings, would not take part.

The EPCR agreed a new format for the 2020–21 European Rugby Champions Cup in response to COVID-19: the top eight eligible teams from the Pro14, the Gallagher Premiership and Top 14 competed in a 24-team tournament divided into two pools of twelve teams, with each team playing four games in the pool stage - two at home and two away.

=== First block ===
The Pro14 season started on 2 October. Ulster started the season with five straight victories.

=== Autumn internationals ===
The Ireland team for the Autumn Nations Cup was announced on 5 November, and included five Ulster players, Iain Henderson, Rob Herring, Billy Burns, Stuart McCloskey and Jacob Stockdale. Burns made his international debut against Wales. Eric O'Sullivan was called up during the tournament, and made his debut against Georgia.

The Pro14 season continued during the tournament, and Ulster played three games, winning them all.

=== Second block ===
Ulster lost their first two games in the Champions Cup, at home against Toulouse and away to Gloucester. After the first two rounds, the EPCR took the decision to temporarily suspend rounds 3 and 4, and later confirmed that rounds 3 and 4 would not take place. Ulster were eliminated from the Champions Cup and joined the Challenge Cup in the round of 16.

In the Pro14, they won their next two matches, but lost a third, away to Leinster. It was announced in December 2020 that the 2020–21 Pro14 season would conclude after 16 rounds, with the winners of each conference advancing straight to the final on 27 March 2021. Four South African Super Rugby teams - the Bulls, Lions, Sharks and Stormers - would then be introduced in the Rainbow Cup.

=== Six Nations break ===
The Ireland squad for the 2021 Six Nations Championship was announced on 25 January, and included Iain Henderson, Rob Herring, Tom O'Toole, Billy Burns and Stuart McCloskey, with Jacob Stockdale added to the squad later.

Ulster played five Pro14 matches during the tournament, winning four and losing once, at home to Leinster. They finished second in Conference A, missing out on the final.

=== Third block ===
Having been eliminated from the Champions Cup, Ulster joined the Challenge Cup in the round of sixteen. After strong performances in away wins against Harlequins and Northampton Saints, Ulster faced a semi-final away to Leicester Tigers. They controlled the game in the first half, but after John Cooney departed with a head injury, Ulster's performance fell away, and a masterclass by England fly-half George Ford won the tie for Leicester.

Leading try-scorer Marcell Coetzee left in April. He had announced his intention to go home to South Africa and join the Bulls, but after he sustained a season-ending injury in March, the club agreed to release him from his contract early.

Ulster's poor performance in the second half of the Challenge Cup semi-final followed them into the Rainbow Cup, and they finished tenth of twelve in the European pool.

=== Post-season ===
Ulster led the Pro14 in offloads with 130, tackle success at 90%, lineout success at 92%, scrums won at 97% and kicks retained with 11, and were second in points scored, tries, metres gained, defenders beaten, clean breaks and turnovers won. Scrum-half John Cooney was the league's leading points scorer with 115, and led the league in try assists with 13 and clean breaks with 22. Cooney, Fullback Michael Lowry, number 8 Marcell Coetzee and loosehead prop Eric O'Sullivan were named in the Pro14 Dream Team. Coetzee was named Players' Player of the Year, and was joint top try scorer, alongside Leinster's Scott Penny and Connacht's Alex Wootton.

Academy players Cormac Izuchukwu, Nathan Doak, David McCann, Callum Reid and Aaron Sexton all made their senior debuts this season. Billy Burns and Eric O'Sullivan made their international debuts with Ireland.

At the Ulster Rugby Awards, Alan O'Connor was named Player of the Year, with Iain Henderson Personality of the Year, John Cooney Supporters' Club Player of the Year, Nick Timoney Rugby Writers Player of the Year, and James Hume Young Player of the Year.

== Staff ==
Position	Name	Nationality
Chief executive officer	Jonny Petrie	Scotland
Operations director	Bryn Cunningham	Ireland
Head coach	Dan McFarland	England
Attack coach	Dwayne Peel	Wales
Defence coach	Jared Payne	Ireland
Forwards coach	Roddy Grant	Scotland
Skills coach	Dan Soper	New Zealand
Academy manager	Kieran Campbell	Ireland

== Squad ==
=== Senior squad ===
==== Players in ====
- (Wales) Bradley Roberts from (Ireland) Rainey Old Boys, initially as short-term injury cover, later permanent.

==== Promoted from academy ====
- (Ireland) Stewart Moore

==== Players out ====
- (Ireland) Angus Kernohan to (England) Ealing Trailfinders
- (Ireland) Zack McCall released
- (Ireland) Tommy O'Hagan released
- (Ireland) Clive Ross released
- (Ireland) Johnny Stewart to (Netherlands) Utrechtse Studenten Rugby Society

Ulster Rugby squad
**Props**: (Ireland) **Marty Moore** (23 appearances, 20 starts, 5 points); (Ireland) Eric O'Sullivan (21 apps, 16 starts, 5 pts); (Ireland) Andrew Warwick (14 apps, 5 starts, 1 (red card) ); (Ireland) Tom O'Toole (15 apps, 2 starts, 20 pts); (Ireland) Kyle McCall (6 apps, 1 start, 1 (yellow card) ); (Ireland) Ross Kane (5 apps, 1 start); (South Africa) Gareth Milasinovich* (6 apps, no starts); (Ireland) Callum Reid (5 apps, 1 (yellow card) ); (Ireland) **Jack McGrath** (no apps); **Hookers**: (Ireland) John Andrew (17 apps, 12 starts, 35 pts, 1 (yellow card) ); (Ireland) **Rob Herring** (13 apps, 11 starts, 25 pts, 1 (yellow card) ); (Ireland) Adam McBurney (12 apps, 2 starts, 10 pts); (South Africa) Bradley Roberts* (5 apps, 5 pts); **Locks**: (Ireland) Alan O'Connor (23 apps, 19 starts, 5 pts, 1 (yellow card) ); (Ireland) **Kieran Treadwell** (19 apps, 13 starts, 5 pts, 1 (yellow card) ); (Australia) **Sam Carter** (11 apps, 9 starts, 5 pts); (Ireland) **Iain Henderson** (c) (7 apps, 7 starts, 15 pts, 1 (yellow card) ); (Ireland) David O'Connor (8 apps, 1 start); (Ireland) Cormac Izuchukwu (6 apps, 1 start)	**Back row**: (Ireland) **Jordi Murphy** (16 apps, 15 starts, 20 pts, 1 (yellow card) ); (Ireland) Nick Timoney (17 apps, 14 starts, 20 pts, 1 (yellow card) ); (South Africa) **Marcell Coetzee** (12 apps, 11 starts, 45 pts, 1 (yellow card) ); (Ireland) **Sean Reidy** (19 apps, 13 starts, 25 pts); (Ireland) Matty Rea (14 apps, 10 starts); (Ireland) Greg Jones (10 apps, 4 starts); (Ireland) Marcus Rea (7 apps, 4 starts); (Ireland) David McCann (6 apps, 4 starts); **Scrum-halves**: (Ireland) **John Cooney** (19 apps, 19 starts, 170 pts); (New Zealand) **Alby Mathewson** (14 apps, 4 starts, 10 pts, 1 (yellow card) ); (Ireland) David Shanahan (12 apps, 2 starts, 10 pts); (Ireland) Nathan Doak (2 apps); **Fly-halves**: (Ireland) **Ian Madigan** (20 apps, 10 starts, 42 pts); (England) Billy Burns* (10 apps, 9 starts, 25 pts); (Ireland) Bill Johnston (6 apps, 2 starts, 21 pts); (Zimbabwe) Angus Curtis* (1 app)	**Centres**: (Ireland) James Hume (20 apps, 19 starts, 10 pts); (Ireland) **Stuart McCloskey** (15 apps, 15 starts, 10 pts, 1 (yellow card) ); (Ireland) Stewart Moore (13 apps, 12 starts, 30 pts); (Ireland) **Luke Marshall** (4 apps, 3 starts, 5 pts); **Wings**: (Ireland) **Jacob Stockdale** (14 apps, 14 starts, 15 pts, 1 (yellow card) ); (Ireland) Rob Lyttle (14 apps, 11 starts, 15 pts); (New Zealand) Matt Faddes (13 apps, 10 starts, 10 pts, 1 (yellow card) ); (Ireland) **Craig Gilroy** (11 apps, 9 starts, 10 pts); (Ireland) Robert Baloucoune (8 apps, 7 starts, 15pts); (Ireland) Ben Moxham (4 apps); (Ireland) Aaron Sexton (1 app); **Fullbacks**: (Ireland) Michael Lowry (22 apps, 18 starts, 53 pts, 1 (yellow card) ); (Ireland) Ethan McIlroy (14 apps, 7 starts, 10 pts); (South Africa) Louis Ludik* (4 apps, 2 starts, 12 pts); (Ireland) **Will Addison** (3 apps, 1 start)
(c) denotes the team captain, **Bold** denotes internationally capped players. Italics denotes academy players who appeared in the senior team.^{*} denotes players qualified to play for Ireland on residency or dual nationality. Players and their allocated positions from the Ulster Rugby website.

=== Academy squad ===
==== Players in ====
- (Ireland) Nathan Doak from (Ireland) Wallace High School
- Cormac Izuchukwu from Ireland Sevens.
- (Ireland) Ben Carson from (Ireland) Wallace High School
- (Ireland) Reuben Crothers from (Ireland) Wallace High School
- (Ireland) Lewis Finlay from (Ireland) Down High School
- (Ireland) James McCormick from (Ireland) Dalriada School

==== Players out ====
- (Ireland) Matthew Dalton to (United States) Utah Warriors
- (Ireland) Matthew Agnew
- (Ireland) Joe Dunleavy
- (Ireland) Aaron Hall
- (Zimbabwe) Graham Curtis
- (Ireland) Jack Regan to (New Zealand) Dunedin Sharks

Ulster Rugby Academy squad
**Props**: (Ireland) Callum Reid **(2)** (5 apps); **Hookers**: (Ireland) Tom Stewart **(2)**; (Ireland) James McCormick **(1)**; **Locks**: (Ireland) Cormac Izuchukwu **(1)** (6 apps, 1 start)	**Back row**: (Ireland) Azur Allison **(3)**; (Ireland) Reuben Crothers **(1)**; (Ireland) David McCann **(3)** (6 apps, 4 starts); **Scrum-halves**: (Ireland) Nathan Doak **(1)** (2 apps); (Ireland) Lewis Finlay **(1)**; **Fly-halves**: (Ireland) Bruce Houston **(3)**	**Centres**: (Ireland) Ben Carson **(1)**; (Ireland) Hayden Hyde **(2)**; **Wings**: (Ireland) Ben Moxham (4 apps); (Ireland) Conor Rankin **(2)**; (Ireland) Aaron Sexton **(2)** (1 app); **Fullbacks**: (Ireland) Ethan McIlroy **(2)** (14 apps, 7 starts, 10 pts)
Number in brackets indicates players stage in the three-year academy cycle.^{*} denotes players qualified to play for Ireland on residency or dual nationality. Players and their allocated positions from the Ulster Rugby website.

== Season record ==
Competition	Played	Won	Drawn	Lost	PF	PA	PD	TF	TA
2020-21 Champions Cup	2	0	0	2	56	67	-11	7	9
2020-21 Challenge Cup	3	2	0	1	116	81	35	16	10
2020-21 Pro14	16	14	0	2	469	263	206	65	34
Rainbow Cup	5	1	1	3	85	116	-31	12	18
Total	26	17	1	8	726	527	199	100	71

== European Rugby Champions Cup ==
=== Pool B ===
Team	P	W	D	L	PF	PA	Diff	TF	TA	TB	LB	Pts
(France) Lyon	2	2	0	0	83	10	+73	12	1	1	0	10
(France) Racing 92	2	2	0	0	75	29	+46	11	4	2	0	10
(France) Toulouse	2	2	0	0	57	22	+35	8	3	2	0	10
(Ireland) Munster	2	2	0	0	60	38	+22	5	5	0	0	8
(France) Clermont	2	1	0	1	82	77	+5	11	8	2	0	6
(England) Bristol Bears	2	1	0	1	65	69	-4	9	9	2	0	6
(England) Exeter Chiefs	2	1	0	1	42	28	+14	6	4	1	0	5
(England) Gloucester	2	1	0	1	48	89	-41	6	12	1	0	5
(Ireland) Ulster	2	0	0	2	56	67	-11	7	9	1	2	3
(Ireland) Connacht	2	0	0	2	40	53	-13	5	8	0	1	1
(England) Harlequins	2	0	0	2	14	70	-56	2	9	0	0	0
(Scotland) Glasgow Warriors	2	0	0	2	0	70	-70	0	10	0	0	0

11 December 2020	(1 BP) Ulster (Ireland)	22–29	(France) Toulouse (1 BP)	Ravenhill Stadium, Belfast
20:00	Try: Herring (2) 14' c, 57' c Madigan 17' m Con: Cooney (2/3) 15', 59'; Pen: Cooney (1/2) 44'	Report; Highlights	Try: Kolbe (2) 20' c, 65' m Dupont 39' c Arnold 53' c Con: Ramos (3/4) 21', 40', 54'; Pen: Ramos (1/1) 77'; Cards: Médard (yellow card) 69'	Referee: Matthew Carley (England)
Ulster lineup: 1. Eric O'Sullivan, 2. Rob Herring, 3. Marty Moore, 4. Alan O'Connor, 5. Sam Carter, 6. Matty Rea, 7. Sean Reidy, 8. Marcell Coetzee, 9. John Cooney, 10. Ian Madigan, 11. Jacob Stockdale, 12. Stuart McCloskey, 13. James Hume, 14. Matt Faddes, 15. Michael Lowry.; Replacements: 16. John Andrew (for Herring, 58), 17. Andrew Warwick (for O'Sullivan, 74), 18. O'Toole (for M. Moore, 51), 19. David O'Connor (for Carter, 50), 20. Greg Jones (for Coetzee, 43), 21. Alby Mathewson, 22. Stewart Moore, 23. Craig Gilroy (for Madigan, 72).				Referee: Matthew Carley (England)

19 December 2020	(1 BP) Gloucester (England)	38–34	(Ireland) Ulster (2 BP)	Kingsholm, Gloucester
15:15	Try: Rees-Zammit 6' c Penalty try (2) 27', 75'; Atkinson 42' c Barton 80'+5 c Con: Evans (3/3) 8', 44', 80'+6; Pen: Evans (1/1) 23'; Cards: Rees-Zammit (yellow card) 58'	Report; Highlights	Try: Burns 11' c Cooney 68' c Lowry 53' c Penalty try 58'; Con: Cooney (3/3) 12', 54', 66'; Pen: Cooney (2/3) 34', 66'; Cards: Herring (yellow card) 25'; A. O'Connor (yellow card) 36'; McIlroy (yellow card) 74'	Attendance: 2,000; Referee: Alex Ruiz (France)
Ulster lineup: 1. Eric O'Sullivan, 2. Rob Herring, 3. Marty Moore, 4. Alan O'Connor, 5. David O'Connor, 6. Sean Reidy, 7. Jordi Murphy, 8. Nick Timoney, 9. John Cooney, 10. Billy Burns, 11. Jacob Stockdale, 12. Stuart McCloskey, 13. James Hume, 14. Matt Faddes, 15. Michael Lowry.; Replacements: 16. John Andrew (for Faddes 30-36'), 17. Kyle McCall, 18. Tom O'Toole (for M. Moore, 43), 19. Matty Rea (for Reidy, 43), 20. Greg Jones, 21. Alby Mathewson, 22. Ian Madigan (for Burns, 75), 23. Ethan McIlroy (for Lowry, 73).				Attendance: 2,000; Referee: Alex Ruiz (France)

== European Rugby Challenge Cup ==
=== Round of 16 ===
4 April 2021	Harlequins (England)	21–57	(Ireland) Ulster	Twickenham Stoop, London
20:00 BST	Try: Lawday 31' c Kenningham 64' c Els 77' c Con: Herron (3/3) 32', 64', 78'	Report; Highlights	Try: McCloskey 7' c Herring (2) 21' c, 55' c Reidy (2) 26' c, 69' c Lowry 33' m Burns 59' c Mathewson 65' c Con: Cooney (5/6) 8', 23', 27', 57', 60'; Madigan (2/2) 66', 70'; Pen: Cooney (1/1) 12'; Cards: Murphy (yellow card) 31'	Attendance: 0 Referee: Romain Poite (France)
Ulster lineup: 1. Eric O'Sullivan, 2. Rob Herring, 3. Marty Moore, 4. Alan O'Connor, 5. Kieran Treadwell, 6. Sean Reidy, 7. Jordi Murphy, 8. Nick Timoney, 9. John Cooney, 10. Billy Burns, 11. Jacob Stockdale, 12. Stuart McCloskey, 13. James Hume, 14. Robert Baloucoune, 15. Michael Lowry.; Replacements: 16. John Andrew (for Herring, 73), 17. Andrew Warwick (for O'Sullivan, 63), 18. Tom O'Toole (for M. Moore, 57), 19. Cormac Izuchukwu (for Treadwell, 46), 20. Matty Rea (for Izuchukwu, 55), 21. Alby Mathewson (for Cooney, 65), 22. Ian Madigan (for Burns, 65), 23. Ethan McIlroy (for Lowry, 67).				Attendance: 0 Referee: Romain Poite (France)

=== Quarter-final ===
10 April 2021	Northampton Saints (England)	27–35	(Ireland) Ulster	Franklin's Gardens, Northampton
20:00 BST	Try: Mitchell 4' c Freeman (2) 32' m, 34' c Sleightholme 58' m Con: Francis (2/4) 6', 35'; Pen: Francis (1/1) 16'; Cards: Isiekwe (yellow card) 9'; Matavesi (yellow card) 12'; Ribbans (yellow card) 23'	Report; Highlights	Try: Penalty try 11'; Herring 24' c Moore 46' c Cooney 61' c Stockdale 72' c Con: Cooney (4/4) 25', 47', 62', 73'	Attendance: 0 Referee: Alexandre Ruiz (France)
Ulster lineup: 1. Eric O'Sullivan, 2. Rob Herring, 3. Marty Moore, 4. Alan O'Connor, 5. Kieran Treadwell, 6. Sean Reidy, 7. Jordi Murphy, 8. Nick Timoney, 9. John Cooney, 10. Billy Burns, 11. Jacob Stockdale, 12. Stuart McCloskey, 13. James Hume, 14. Robert Baloucoune, 15. Michael Lowry.; Replacements: 16. John Andrew, 17. Andrew Warwick (for O'Sullivan, 66), 18. Tom O'Toole (for M. Moore, 57), 19. Matty Rea (for Reidy, 49), 20. Greg Jones, 21. Alby Mathewson (for Hume, 79), 22. Ian Madigan (for Burns, 75), 23. Ethan McIlroy (for Lowry, 59).				Attendance: 0 Referee: Alexandre Ruiz (France)

=== Semi-final ===
30 April 2021	Leicester Tigers (England)	33–24	(Ireland) Ulster	Welford Road Stadium, Leicester
20:00 BST	Try: Wiese 44' c Genge 52' c Porter 73' c Con: Ford (3/3) 44', 54', 75'; Pen: Ford (3/4) 6', 19', 49'; Drop: Ford 58'; Cards: Youngs (yellow card) 14'	Report; Highlights	Try: Henderson 15' c Burns 21' c Timoney 67' c Con: Cooney (2/2) 16', 22'; Lowry (1/1) 68'; Pen: Cooney (1/1) 9'	Attendance: 0 Referee: Pascal Gaüzère (France)
Ulster lineup: 1. Eric O'Sullivan, 2. Rob Herring, 3. Marty Moore, 4. Alan O'Connor, 5. Iain Henderson, 6. Matty Rea, 7. Jordi Murphy, 8. Nick Timoney, 9. John Cooney, 10. Billy Burns, 11. Ethan McIlroy, 12. Stuart McCloskey, 13. James Hume, 14. Robert Baloucoune, 15. Jacob Stockdale.; Replacements: 16. John Andrew (for Herring, 79), 17. Andrew Warwick (for O'Sullivan, 60), 18. Tom O'Toole (for M. Moore, 60), 19. Kieran Treadwell (for A. Connor, 58), 20. Sean Reidy (for Matty Rea, 37, 55), 21. Alby Mathewson (for Cooney, 43), 22. Michael Lowry (for Burns, 66), 23. Will Addison (for Baloucoune, 55).				Attendance: 0 Referee: Pascal Gaüzère (France)

== Pro14 ==
2020–21 Pro14 table
Conference A
	Team	P	W	D	L	PF	PA	PD	TF	TA	TBP	LBP	PTS
1	(Ireland) Leinster (CH)	16	14	0	2	576	285	+291	82	33	14	1	71
2	(Ireland) Ulster	16	14	0	2	469	263	+206	65	34	8	0	64
3	(Wales) Ospreys	16	8	0	8	301	318	-17	34	39	1	3	36
4	(Scotland) Glasgow Warriors	16	6	0	10	335	377	-42	40	47	2	4	30
5	(Wales) Dragons	16	6	0	10	215	394	-79	36	50	2	3	29
6	(Italy) Zebre	16	4	0	12	237	508	-271	22	69	0	1	17
Conference B
	Team	P	W	D	L	PF	PA	PD	TF	TA	TBP	LBP	PTS
1	(Ireland) Munster (RU)	16	14	0	2	413	250	+163	49	26	7	2	64
2	(Ireland) Connacht	16	8	0	8	396	353	+43	53	36	7	6	45
3	(Wales) Scarlets	16	8	0	8	319	333	-14	36	38	3	4	39
4	(Wales) Cardiff Blues	16	8	0	8	265	284	-19	30	32	3	1	36
5	(Scotland) Edinburgh	16	5	1	10	247	344	-97	29	43	1	4	29*
6	(Italy) Benetton	16	0	1	15	252	415	-164	34	53	1	6	7*
* Cancelled fixture: Edinburgh awarded four match points.
If teams are level at any stage, tiebreakers are applied in the following order: 1. number of matches won 2. the difference between points for and points against 3. the number of tries scored 4. the most points scored 5. the difference between tries for and tries against 6. the fewest red cards received 7. the fewest yellow cards received
Green background indicates teams that will compete in the Pro14 Final, and also earn a place in the 2021–22 European Champions Cup Blue background indicates teams outside the play-off places that earn a place in the 2021–22 European Champions Cup; Plain background indicates teams that earn a place in the 2021–22 European Rugby Challenge Cup. (CH) Champions. (RU) Runners-up. (PO) Champions Cup play-off winners.

2 October 2020	(1 BP) Ulster (Ireland)	35–24	(Italy) Benetton	Ravenhill Stadium, Belfast
20:15	Try: Hume 8' c S. Moore 11' c Lowry 28' c Coetzee 46' c McBurney 73' c Con: Cooney (4) 9' 12' 30' 47'; Johnston 74'; Cards: Stockdale (yellow card) 32'	Report; Match centre Highlights	Try: Ruzza 23' c Garbisi 32' c Steyn 38' c Con: Garbisi (3) 24' 33' 39'; Pen: Garbisi 43'	Referee: Adam Jones
Ulster lineup: 1. Jack McGrath, 2. Rob Herring, 3. Marty Moore, 4. Sam Carter, 5. Iain Henderson, 6. Matty Rea, 7. Sean Reidy, 8. Marcell Coetzee, 9. John Cooney, 10. Michael Lowry, 11. Rob Lyttle, 12. Stewart Moore, 13. James Hume, 14. Craig Gilroy, 15. Jacob Stockdale.; Replacements: 16. Adam McBurney (for Herring, 64), 17. Eric O'Sullivan (for McGrath, 40), 18. Gareth Milasinovich (for Moore, 69-79), 19. David O'Connor for Carter, 50), 20. David McCann (for Reidy, 56), 21. Alby Mathewson (for Cooney, 59), 22. Bill Johnston (for Lowry, 59), 23. Louis Ludik (for Coetzee, 74).				Referee: Adam Jones

10 October 2020	Ospreys (Wales)	12–24	(Ireland) Ulster	Liberty Stadium, Swansea
17:15	Pen: Myler (4) 21' 40+1' 57' 65'	Report; Report; Highlights	Try: Stockdale 7' c Coetzee 48' c Cooney 72'; Con: Cooney (3) 8' 49' 73'; Pen: Cooney 31'; Cards: Henderson (red card) 75'	Referee: Mike Adamson
Ulster lineup: 1. Jack McGrath, 2. Rob Herring, 3. Marty Moore, 4. Alan O'Connor, 5. Iain Henderson, 6. Matty Rea, 7. Marcus Rea, 8. Marcell Coetzee, 9. John Cooney, 10. Ian Madigan, 11. Rob Lyttle, 12. Stewart Moore, 13. James Hume, 14. Matt Faddes, 15. Jacob Stockdale.; Replacements: 16. Adam McBurney (for Herring, 71), 17. Eric O'Sullivan (for McGrath, 45), 18. Gareth Milasinovich (for M. Moore, 65), 19. Kieran Treadwell (for O'Connor, 59), 20. Greg Jones (for Matty Rea, 59), 21. David Shanahan, 22. Louis Ludik (for Faddes, 71), 23. Sean Reidy).				Referee: Mike Adamson

25 October 2020	(1 BP) Ulster (Ireland)	40–17	(Wales) Dragons	Ravenhill Stadium, Belfast
15:00	Try: Coetzee 4' c O'Sullivan 13' c Reidy 26' c Ludik (2) 31' c 38' c O'Connor 66'; Con: Cooney (5) 5' 15' 27' 32' 39'; Cards: Faddes (yellow card)	Match centre Highlights	Try: Hewitt 60' c Roberts 80' c Con: Davies (2) 61' 80+1'; Pen: Davies 9'	Referee: Gianluca Gnecchi
Ulster lineup: 1. Eric O'Sullivan, 2. John Andrew, 3. Marty Moore, 4. Alan O'Connor, 5. Sam Carter, 6. Sean Reidy, 7. Jordi Murphy, 8. Marcell Coetzee, 9. John Cooney, 10. Ian Madigan, 11. Louis Ludik, 12. Stewart Moore, 13. James Hume, 14. Matt Faddes, 15. Rob Lyttle.; Replacements: 16. Adam McBurney (for Andrew, 49), 17. Kyle McCall (for O'Sullivan, 54), 18. Ross Kane (for M. Moore, 54), 19. Kieran Treadwell (for Carter, 49), 20. Nick Timoney (for Coetzee, 54), 21. David Shanahan (for Cooney, 59), 22. Bill Johnston (for Madigan, 46), 23. Michael Lowry (for Hume, 74).				Referee: Gianluca Gnecchi

2 November 2020	(1 BP) Cardiff Blues (Wales)	7–11	(Ireland) Ulster	Rodney Parade, Newport
18:00	Try: Lee-Lo 22' c Con: Evans 23'; Cards: Robinson (yellow card)	Match centre Highlights	Try: Lowry 40+1'; Pen: Cooney (2) 16' 64'	Referee: Adam Jones
Ulster lineup: 1. Eric O'Sullivan, 2. Adam McBurney, 3. Marty Moore, 4. Alan O'Connor, 5. Kieran Treadwell, 6. Matty Rea, 7. Jordi Murphy, 8. Nick Timoney, 9. John Cooney, 10. Billy Burns, 11. Louis Ludik, 12. Stuart McCloskey, 13. Stewart Moore, 14. Craig Gilroy, 15. Michael Lowry.; Replacements: 16. John Andrew (for McBurney, 47), 17. Jack McGrath (for O'Sullivan, 47), 18. Ross Kane (for Moore, 68), 19. Sam Carter (for O'Connor, 56), 20. Sean Reidy (for Timoney, 47), 21. Alby Mathewson (for Burns, 73), 22. Luke Marshall (for S. Moore, 52), 23. Ethan McIlroy (for Ludik, 23).				Referee: Adam Jones

9 November 2020	(1 BP) Ulster (Ireland)	40–15	(Scotland) Glasgow Warriors	Ravenhill Stadium, Belfast
20:15	Try: Andrew 11' c Coetzee 24' c Carter 36' c Cooney 40+2' c Reidy 49'; Faddes 55' c Con: Cooney (5) 12' 25' 37' 40+3' 56'; Cards: Lowry (yellow card) 60'	Match centre Highlights	Try: Ioane 4' c Stewart 60'; Con: Horne 4'; Pen: Horne 20'; Cards: Matawalu (yellow card) 40'	Referee: Nigel Owens
Ulster lineup: 1. Eric O'Sullivan, 2. John Andrew, 3. Marty Moore, 4. Kieran Treadwell, 5. Sam Carter, 6. Matty Rea, 7. Sean Reidy, 8. Marcell Coetzee, 9. John Cooney, 10. Ian Madigan, 11. Matt Faddes, 12. Stewart Moore, 13. Luke Marshall, 14. Craig Gilroy, 15. Michael Lowry.; Replacements: 16. Adam McBurney (for Andrew 60'), 17. Kyle McCall (for O'Sullivan 53'), 18. Gareth Milasinovich (for M. Moore 60'), 19. Alan O'Connor (for Carter 47'), 20. Marcus Rea (for Coetzee 60'), 21. David Shanahan (for Cooney 68'), 22. Bill Johnston (for Madigan 47'), 23. Ethan McIlroy (for Marshall 51').				Referee: Nigel Owens

16 November 2020	Zebre (Italy)	14–57	(Ireland) Ulster (1 BP)	Stadio Sergio Lanfranchi, Parma
19:00	Try: Bruno 10' c Casilio 53' c Con: Rizzi 10'; Pescetto 54'	Match centre Highlights	Try: Coetzee (4) 5' c 24' c 35' c 58; S. Moore 28'; Johnston 45' c Marshall 49' c McIlroy 74'; Shanahan 79' c Con: Johnston (6) 6' 25' 36' 47' 50' 80'	Referee: Ben Whitehouse
Ulster lineup: 1. Eric O'Sullivan, 2. John Andrew, 3. Marty Moore, 4. Alan O'Connor, 5. Sam Carter, 6. Greg Jones, 7. Jordi Murphy, 8. Marcell Coetzee, 9. Alby Mathewson, 10. Bill Johnston, 11. Ethan McIlroy, 12. Stewart Moore, 13. Luke Marshall, 14. Craig Gilroy, 15. Michael Lowry.; Replacements: 16. Adam McBurney (for Andrew 55'), 17. Andrew Warwick (for O'Sullivan 55'), 18. Gareth Milasinovich (for M. Moore 47'), 19. David O'Connor (for A. O'Connor 51'), 20. Sean Reidy (for Coetzee 64'), 21. David Shanahan (for Mathewson 55'), 22. Ian Madigan (for S. Moore 51'), 23. Rob Lyttle (for Lowry 61').				Referee: Ben Whitehouse

22 November 2020	(1 BP) Ulster (Ireland)	24–22	(Wales) Scarlets (2 BP)	Ravenhill Stadium, Belfast
19:35	Try: Lyttle 6'; S. Moore 30' c Reidy 39' c Treadwell 64' c Con: Cooney (2) 32' 40'; Johnston 65'; Cards: Treadwell (yellow card) 16'; Faddes (yellow card) 46'	Match centre Highlights	Try: Asquith 17' c Conbeer 41'; Evans 54'; Price 76' c Con: O'Brien (2) 18', 77'	Referee: Andrea Piardi
Ulster lineup: 1. Eric O'Sullivan, 2. John Andrew, 3. Marty Moore, 4. Alan O'Connor, 5. Kieran Treadwell, 6. Matty Rea, 7. Sean Reidy, 8. Marcell Coetzee, 9. John Cooney, 10. Bill Johnston, 11. Rob Lyttle, 12. Stewart Moore, 13. Luke Marshall, 14. Matt Faddes, 15. Michael Lowry.; Replacements: 16. Adam McBurney (for Andrew 55'), 17. Kyle McCall (for O'Sullivan 72'), 18. Tom O'Toole (for M. Moore 55'), 19. David O'Connor (for A. O'Connor 72'), 20. Jordi Murphy (for Matty Rea 52'), 21. Alby Mathewson (for Cooney 55'), 22. Ian Madigan (for Faddes 59'), 23. Craig Gilroy (for Marshall 3').				Referee: Andrea Piardi

30 November 2020	Edinburgh (Scotland)	14–43	(Ireland) Ulster (1 BP)	Murrayfield Stadium, Edinburgh
20:15	Try: Blain (2) 32' c 44' c Con: Chamberlain (2) 34' 45'; Cards: Mata (yellow card) 60'	Match centre Highlights	Try: S. Moore 2' c Andrew (3) 18' 72' 80@1'; Cooney (2) 23' c 66' c Murphy 59' c Con: Cooney (4) 3' 24' 60' 68'	Referee: Craig Evans
Ulster lineup: 1. Andrew Warwick, 2. John Andrew, 3. Marty Moore, 4. Alan O'Connor, 5. Sam Carter, 6. Sean Reidy, 7. Jordi Murphy, 8. Marcell Coetzee, 9. John Cooney, 10. Ian Madigan, 11. Rob Lyttle, 12. Stewart Moore, 13. James Hume, 14. Matt Faddes, 15. Michael Lowry.; Replacements: 16. Bradley Roberts (for Coetzee 74'), 17. Kyle McCall (for Warwick 48'), 18. Gareth Milasinovich (for M. Moore 50'), 19. David O'Connor (for A. O'Connor 62'), 20. David McCann (for Reidy 68'), 21. David Shanahan (for Cooney 68'), 22. Bill Johnston (for Madigan 68'), 23. Aaron Sexton (for Lyttle 8').				Referee: Craig Evans

27 December 2020	Connacht (Ireland)	19–32	(Ireland) Ulster	The Sportsground, Galway
19:35	Try: Carty 20' c Porch 27' c Daly 61'; Con: Carty (2) 21' 28'	Match centre Highlights	Try: Murphy 48' c Timoney 53' c Con: Madigan (2) 49' 55'; Pen: Madigan (6) 2' 10' 24' 65' 74' 78'; Cards: McCall (yellow card) 20'	Referee: Sean Gallagher
Ulster lineup: 1. Kyle McCall, 2. John Andrew, 3. Tom O'Toole, 4. Alan O'Connor, 5. Kieran Treadwell, 6. Greg Jones, 7. Jordi Murphy, 8. Nick Timoney, 9. Alby Mathewson, 10. Ian Madigan, 11. Ethan McIlroy, 12. Stewart Moore, 13. James Hume, 14. Craig Gilroy, 15. Michael Lowry.; Replacements: 16. Bradley Roberts (for Andrew 68'), 17. Andrew Warwick (for McIlroy 19'-31'), 18. Marty Moore (for O'Toole 52'), 19. David O'Connor (for Treadwell 69'), 20. Matty Rea (for Jones 69'), 21. David Shanahan (for Mathewson 78'), 22. Ben Moxham (for S. Moore 62'), 23. Matt Faddes (for Gilroy 65').				Referee: Sean Gallagher

2 January 2021	Ulster (Ireland)	15–10	(Ireland) Munster (1 BP)	Ravenhill Stadium, Belfast
17:15	Try: Faddes 6'; McIlroy 16' c Con: Cooney 17'; Pen: Cooney 28'; Cards: Reid (yellow card) 80'	Match centre Highights; Full game	Try: Sweetnam 80+2'; Con: Crowley 80+4'; Pen: Healy 12'; Cards: Holland (yellow card) 58'	Referee: Mike Adamson
Ulster lineup: 1. Eric O'Sullivan, 2. Rob Herring, 3. Marty Moore, 4. Kieran Treadwell, 5. Sam Carter, 6. Matty Rea, 7. David McCann, 8. Nick Timoney, 9. John Cooney, 10. Billy Burns, 11. Ethan McIlroy, 12. Stuart McCloskey, 13. James Hume, 14. Matt Faddes, 15. Jacob Stockdale.; Replacements: 16. Adam McBurney (for Herring 73'), 17. Callum Reid (for O'Sullivan 48'), 18. Tom O'Toole (for M. Moore 52'), 19. David O'Connor (for Carter 65'), 20. Marcell Coetzee (for Matty Rea 47'), 21. Nathan Doak (for Cooney 65'), 22. Ian Madigan (for Burns 72'), 23. Ben Moxham (for Stockdale 77').				Referee: Mike Adamson

8 January 2021	(1 BP) Leinster (Ireland)	24–12	(Ireland) Ulster	RDS Arena, Dublin
19:35	Try: Kearney 22'; Cronin 43' c Henshaw 52'; Tracy 73' c Con: Sexton 44'; R. Byrne 75'	Match centre Highlights	Pen: Cooney (4) 14' 34' 40' 69'; Cards: Coetzee (yellow card) 29'	Referee: Andrew Brace
Ulster lineup: 1. Andrew Warwick, 2. Rob Herring, 3. Marty Moore, 4. Alan O'Connor, 5. Sam Carter, 6. Greg Jones, 7. Jordi Murphy, 8. Marcell Coetzee, 9. John Cooney, 10. Billy Burns, 11. Ethan McIlroy, 12. Stuart McCloskey, 13. James Hume, 14. Matt Faddes, 15. Michael Lowry.; Replacements: 16. John Andrew (for Herring 62'), 17. Eric O'Sullivan (for Warwick 50'), 18. Tom O'Toole (for M. Moore 6'), 19. Kieran Treadwell (for Carter 50'), 20. Nick Timoney (for Jones 48'), 21. David Shanahan (for Cooney 75'), 22. Ian Madigan (for Burns 63'), 23. Ben Moxham (for Faddes 56').				Referee: Andrew Brace

19 February 2021	(1 BP) Glasgow Warriors (Scotland)	13–19	(Ireland) Ulster	Scotstoun Stadium, Glasgow
19:35	Try: Seiluli 76' c Con: Thompson 77'; Pen: Hastings (2) 36' 50'	Match centre Highlights	Try: Lowry 39' c Gilroy 55'; Timoney 62' c Con: Cooney (2) 40' 63'; Cards: Mathewson (yellow card) 74'	Referee: Ben Blain
Ulster lineup: 1. Eric O'Sullivan, 2. John Andrew, 3. Marty Moore, 4. Alan O'Connor, 5. Kieran Treadwell, 6. Nick Timoney, 7. Jordi Murphy, 8. Marcell Coetzee, 9. John Cooney, 10. Ian Madigan, 11. Rob Lyttle, 12. Stuart McCloskey, 13. James Hume, 14. Craig Gilroy, 15. Michael Lowry.; Replacements: 16. Adam McBurney (for Andrew 50'), 17. Andrew Warwick (for O'Sullivan 50'), 18. Tom O'Toole (for M. Moore 46'), 19. Cormac Izuchukwu (for Treadwell 57'), 20. Greg Jones (for Coetzee 40'), 21. Alby Mathewson (for Cooney 68'), 22. Stewart Moore, 23. Matt Faddes (for Gilroy 71').				Referee: Ben Blain

26 February 2021	Ulster (Ireland)	21–7	(Wales) Ospreys	Ravenhill Stadium, Belfast
20:00	Try: Cooney 37' c Andrew 53' c Con: Cooney (2) 39' 54'	Match centre Highlights	Try: Giles 1' c Con: Myler 3'; Cards: Evans (yellow card) 62'	Referee: Sean Gallagher
Ulster lineup: 1. Andrew Warwick, 2. John Andrew, 3. Marty Moore, 4. Alan O'Connor, 5. Kieran Treadwell, 6. Greg Jones, 7. Jordi Murphy, 8. Nick Timoney, 9. John Cooney, 10. Ian Madigan, 11. Jacob Stockdale, 12. Stuart McCloskey, 13. James Hume, 14. Rob Lyttle, 15. Michael Lowry.; Replacements: 16. Adam McBurney (for Andrew 62'), 17. Eric O'Sullivan (for Warwick 50'), 18. Ross Kane (for M. Moore 50'), 19. Cormac Izuchukwu (for Treadwell 62'), 20. Sean Reidy (for Jones 50'), 21. Alby Mathewson (for Cooney 58'), 22. Matt Faddes (for Madigan 70'), 23. Robert Baloucoune (for Stockdale 40').				Referee: Sean Gallagher

6 March 2021	Ulster (Ireland)	19–38	(Ireland) Leinster (1 BP)	Ravenhill Stadium, Belfast
19:35	Try: Coetzee 8' c Baloucoune 13'; Timoney 72' c Con: Cooney 10'; Lowry 73'; Cards: McCloskey (yellow card) 28'; Warwick (red card) 31'; Izuchukwu (yellow card)	Match centre Highlights	Try: Bent 24' c Van der Flier 27' c E. Byrne 36' c Ruddock 56' c Sheehan 78' c Con: R. Byrne (5) 25' 28' 38' 57' 79'; Pen: R. Byrne 4'; Cards: Toner (yellow card) 6'; O'Brien (yellow card) 16'; Ruddock (yellow card)	Referee: Frank Murphy
Ulster rugby: 1. Eric O'Sullivan, 2. John Andrew, 3. Tom O'Toole, 4. Alan O'Connor, 5. Kieran Treadwell, 6. Nick Timoney, 7. Jordi Murphy, 8. Marcell Coetzee, 9. John Cooney, 10. Ian Madigan, 11. Jacob Stockdale, 12. Stuart McCloskey, 13. James Hume, 14. Robert Baloucoune, 15. Michael Lowry.; Replacements: 16. Adam McBurney (for Andrew 40'), 17. Andrew Warwick (for O'Sullivan 25'-30'), 18. Marty Moore (for O'Sullivan 60'), 19. Cormac Izuchukwu (for Treadwell 50'), 20. Sean Reidy (for Murphy 50'), 21. Alby Mathewson (for Cooney 71'), 22. Stewart Moore (for Hume 60'), 23. Rob Lyttle (for Madigan 50').				Referee: Frank Murphy

13 March 2021	(1 BP) Dragons (Wales)	22–26	(Ireland) Ulster (1 BP)	Millennium Stadium, Cardiff
19:35	Try: Griffiths 55' c Dyer 73'; Holmes 77' c Con: Davies 55'; Lewis 77'; Pen: Davies 34'; Cards: Keddie (yellow card) 43'	Match centre Highlights	Try: Mathewson 13' c S. Moore (2) 20' c 60' c Andrew 49'; Con: Lowry (3) 14' 22' 61'; Cards: Andrew (yellow card) 40'; Timoney (yellow card) 72'	Referee: Adam Jones
Ulster lineup: 1. Eric O'Sullivan, 2. John Andrew, 3. Ross Kane, 4. Alan O'Connor, 5. Kieran Treadwell, 6. David McCann, 7. Sean Reidy, 8. Nick Timoney, 9. Alby Mathewson, 10. Michael Lowry, 11. Rob Lyttle, 12. Stuart McCloskey, 13. Stewart Moore, 14. Craig Gilroy, 15. Jacob Stockdale.; Replacements: 16. Bradley Roberts (for McCann 41'-48', for Andrew 57'), 17. Callum Reid (for O'Sullivan 66'), 18. Gareth Milasinovich (for Kane 53'), 19. Cormac Izuchukwu (for Treadwell 61'), 20. Matty Rea, 21. David Shanahan (for Mathewson 61'), 22. Ian Madigan (for Lowry 74'), 23. Ethan McIlroy (for Gilroy 47').				Referee: Adam Jones

19 March 2021	(1 BP) Ulster (Ireland)	49–3	(Italy) Zebre	Ravenhill Stadium, Belfast
20:15	Try: Andrew 12' c Lowry 38' c Baloucoune 42 c Murphy (2) 44' c 60' c Lyttle 66' c Roberts 78' c Con: Cooney (4) 14' 39' 43' 45'; Lowry (3) 61' 67' 79'	Match centre Highlights	Pen: Pescetto 15'; Cards: Manfredi (red card) 34'	Referee: Andrew Brace
Ulster lineup: 1. Eric O'Sullivan, 2. John Andrew, 3. Marty Moore, 4. Cormac Izuchukwu, 5. Kieran Treadwell, 6. Sean Reidy, 7. Jordi Murphy, 8. David McCann, 9. John Cooney, 10. Michael Lowry, 11. Rob Lyttle, 12. Stewart Moore, 13. James Hume, 14. Robert Baloucoune, 15. Ethan McIlroy.; Replacements: 16. Bradley Roberts (for Andrew 52'), 17. Callum Reid (for O'Sullivan 40'), 18. Tom O'Toole (for M. Moore 43'), 19. Alan O'Connor (for Izuchukwu 52'), 20. Matty Rea (for Reidy 52'), 21. David Shanahan (for Cooney 45'), 22. Ian Madigan (for Hume 72'), 23. Ben Moxham (for S. Moore 54').				Referee: Andrew Brace

== Pro14 Rainbow Cup ==
Pro14 Rainbow Cup
	Team	P	W	D	L	PF	PA	PD	TF	TA	Try bonus	Losing bonus	Pts
1	(Italy) Benetton	5	4	1	0	125	78	+47	14	10	2	0	22**
2	(Ireland) Munster	5	4	0	1	170	75	+95	23	8	3	1	20
3	(Scotland) Glasgow Warriors	5	4	0	1	121	117	+4	17	15	3	0	19
4	(Ireland) Leinster	5	3	0	2	124	87	+37	19	10	2	1	15
5	(Wales) Cardiff Blues	5	3	0	2	124	123	+1	16	16	2	1	15
6	(Ireland) Connacht	5	3	0	2	109	133	–24	15	18	2	0	14
7	(Wales) Scarlets	5	1	2	2	110	115	–5	13	15	2	1	13*
8	(Wales) Ospreys	5	2	1	2	103	88	+15	14	11	2	1	11**
9	(Scotland) Edinburgh	5	1	1	3	126	140	–14	18	19	2	2	10
10	(Ireland) Ulster	5	1	1	3	85	116	–31	12	18	2	2	8*
11	(Wales) Dragons	5	1	0	4	117	156	–39	14	22	2	1	7
12	(Italy) Zebre	5	0	0	5	88	174	-86	10	23	0	3	3
* Cancelled fixture: Scarlets awarded four match points. ** Cancelled fixture: Benetton awarded four match points.
If teams are level at any stage, tiebreakers are applied in the following order: 1. number of matches won; 2. the difference between points for and points against; 3. the number of tries scored; 4. the most points scored; 5. the difference between tries for and tries against; 6. the fewest red cards received; 7. the fewest yellow cards received.
Green background (row 1) is the play-off places and earn a place in the final against the 1st placed Rainbow Cup SA team.

23 April 2021	(2 BP) Ulster (Ireland)	24–26	(Ireland) Connacht (1 BP)	Ravenhill Stadium, Belfast
20:15	Try: Jacob Stockdale 23'; Rob Herring 29' c Billy Burns 44'; David Shanahan 72' c Con: John Cooney 30'; Michael Lowry 73'	Match centre Highlights	Try: Paul Boyle 7' c Caolin Blade (2) 50' c 63 c Peter Sullivan 80+3'; Con: Jack Carty 8'; Tom Daly (2) 52' 64'	Referee: Andrew Brace
Ulster lineup: 1. Andrew Warwick, 2. Rob Herring, 3. Tom O'Toole, 4. Kieran Treadwell, 5. Iain Henderson, 6. Matty Rea, 7. Sean Reidy, 8. Nick Timoney, 9. John Cooney, 10. Billy Burns, 11. Ethan McIlroy, 12. Stewart Moore, 13. James Hume, 14. Robert Baloucoune, 15. Jacob Stockdale.; Replacements: 16. John Andrew (for Herring 52'), 17. Eric O'Sullivan (for Warwick 68'), 18. Ross Kane (for O'Toole 61'), 19. Alan O'Connor (for Henderson 49'), 20. Greg Jones (for Treadwell 61'), 21. David Shanahan (for Cooney 61'), 22. Michael Lowry (for Burns 68'), 23. Will Addison (for Stockdale 48').				Referee: Andrew Brace

7 May 2021	(1 BP) Munster (Ireland)	38–10	(Ireland) Ulster	Thomond Park, Limerick
20:15	Try: Rory Scannell (2) 10' c 54' c Conor Murray 26'; Mike Haley c JJ Hanrahan 57' c Andrew Conway 78'; Con: JJ Hanrahan (4) 11' 40+1' 55' 59'	Match centre Highlights; Full game	Try: Iain Henderson 43'; Con: Michael Lowry 45'; Pen: Michael Lowry 2'	Referee: Craig Evans
Ulster lineup: 1. Andrew Warwick, 2. John Andrew, 3. Tom O'Toole, 4. Alan O'Connor, 5. Iain Henderson, 6. Jordi Murphy, 7. Marcus Rea, 8. David McCann, 9. Alby Mathewson, 10. Michael Lowry, 11. Ethan McIlroy, 12. Stuart McCloskey, 13. Will Addison, 14. Rob Lyttle, 15. Jacob Stockdale.; Replacements: 16. Rob Herring (for Andrew 40'), 17. Callum Reid (for Warwick 40'), 18. Marty Moore (for O'Toole 40'), 19. Sam Carter (for Henderson 67'), 20. Nick Timoney (for McCann 40'), 21. David Shanahan (for Mathewson 40'), 22. Angus Curtis (for Lowry 62'), 23. James Hume (for Addison 59').				Referee: Craig Evans

14 May 2021	Leinster (Ireland)	21–17	(Ireland) Ulster (1 BP)	RDS Arena, Dublin
20:15	Try: Cian Healy 25' c Jack Conan 53' c Robbie Henshaw 61' c Con: Garry Ringrose (3) 25' 54' 62'	Match centre Highlights	Try: Robert Baloucoune 18' c Craig Gilroy 79' c Con: Billy Burns 19'; Ian Madigan 79'; Pen: Billy Burns 51'	Referee: Craig Evans
Ulster lineup: 1. Eric O'Sullivan, 2. Rob Herring, 3. Marty Moore, 4. Sam Carter, 5. Iain Henderson, 6. Matty Rea, 7. Sean Reidy, 8. Nick Timoney, 9. David Shanahan, 10. Billy Burns, 11. Craig Gilroy, 12. Stuart McCloskey, 13. James Hume, 14. Robert Baloucoune, 15. Jacob Stockdale.; Replacements: 16. Bradley Roberts (for Herring 63'), 17. Callum Reid (for O'Sullivan 63'), 18. Tom O'Toole (for M. Moore 63'), 19. Alan O'Connor (for Carter 51'), 20. Greg Jones (for Reidy 71'), 21. Nathan Doak (for Shanahan 63'), 22. Ian Madigan (for Burns 63'), 23. Rob Lyttle (for Stockdale 42').				Referee: Craig Evans

29 May 2021	Ulster (Ireland)	Cancelled; 0–0	(Wales) Scarlets	Ravenhill Stadium, Belfast
15:00

5 June 2021	(2 BP) Edinburgh (Scotland)	31–34	(Ireland) Ulster (1 BP)	Murrayfield, Edinburgh
17:15	Try: Duhan van der Merwe 3'; Blair Kinghorn 7' c Pierre Schoeman 67' c Cammy Hutchison 73' c Eroni Sau 76'; Con: Blair Kinghorn (3) 8' 67' 74'	Match centre Highlights	Try: James Hume 12' c Iain Henderson 19' c Stuart McCloskey 27' c Adam McBurney 38'; Rob Lyttle 47'; Con: Ian Madigan (3) 13' 19' 28'; Pen: Ian Madigan 80+1'	Referee: Ben Whitehouse
Ulster lineup: 1. Kyle McCall, 2. Adam McBurney, 3. Marty Moore, 4. Alan O'Connor, 5. Iain Henderson, 6. Matty Rea, 7. Marcus Rea, 8. Nick Timoney, 9. David Shanahan, 10. Ian Madigan, 11. Craig Gilroy, 12. Stuart McCloskey, 13. James Hume, 14. Matt Faddes, 15. Rob Lyttle.; Replacements: 16. Rob Herring (for McBurney 45'), 17. Andrew Warwick (for McCall 45'), 18. Tom O'Toole (for M. Moore 45'), 19. Kieran Treadwell (for O'Connor 60'-68'), 20. Greg Jones (for Marcus Rea 52'), 21. Alby Mathewson (for Shanahan 65'), 22. Billy Burns (for Madigan 40'-65'), 23. Michael Lowry (for Faddes 40').				Referee: Ben Whitehouse

== Home attendance ==
Domestic League					European Cup					Total	
League	Fixtures	Average Attendance	Highest	Lowest	League	Fixtures	Average Attendance	Highest	Lowest	Total Attendance	Average Attendance
2020–21 Pro14; Pro14 Rainbow Cup	0‡	–	–	–	2020–21 European Rugby Champions Cup	0‡	–	–	–	–	–
‡Match figures include fixtures in which COVID-19 restrictions limited attendance, but exclude fixtures in which no spectators were allowed due to the COVID-19 pandemic.

== Awards ==
The Heineken Ulster Rugby Awards ceremony was held online on 7 June 2021. Winners were:

- Heineken Ulster Rugby Personality of the Year: Iain Henderson
- Bank of Ireland Player of the Year: Alan O'Connor (nominees: John Cooney, Marty Moore)
- Ulster Rugby Supporters' Club Player of the Year: John Cooney (nominees: Marcell Coetzee, Michael Lowry)
- Rugby Writers' Player of the Year: Nick Timoney (nominees: Michael Lowry, Jordi Murphy)
- Openreach Young Player of the Year: James Hume (nominees: Michael Lowry, Ethan McIlroy)

== Season reviews ==
- Ulster 2020-21 - Who Did What?, The Front Row Union, 12 August 2021
- Don’t Cry In Front Of The Mexicans: Ulster’s 2020-21 Season (And How They Must Keep Twirling, Twirling, Twirling Towards Freedom in 2021-22), Digging Like a Demented Mole, 28 June 2021
- "The Ulster depth chart: A World Cup winner and the thrilling back three", The42, 17 September 2021
