= Stewart Moore =

Irish rugby union player

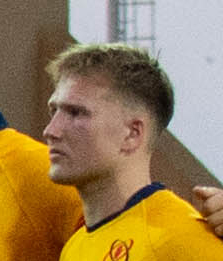
- Born: 8 August 1999 (age 27) Ballymoney, Northern Ireland
- Height: 1.82 m (5 ft 11 1/2 in)
- Weight: 91 kg (14.3 st; 201 lb)
- School: Dalriada School; Ballymena Academy
- University: Belfast Metropolitan College

Rugby union career
- Position: Centre
Amateur team(s)
Years	Team	Apps	(Points)
- Ballymoney RFC
2021-22	Malone	1	(5)
Senior career
Years	Team	Apps	(Points)
2019–	Ulster	86	(80)
2025	→ Newcastle Red Bulls	1	(15)
- Correct as of 13 December 2025
International career
Years	Team	Apps	(Points)
2019	Ireland U20	2	(10)
2022	Emerging Ireland	2	(5)
- Correct as of 15 October 2022

Stewart Moore (born 8 August 1999) is an Irish rugby union player who plays centre for Ulster. Former Ulster coach Dan McFarland describes him as "a lovely balanced runner who can cause defences problems". Ulster and Ireland wing Jacob Stockdale calls him " a serious talent ... one of those players where everything seems to come naturally for him. Really good passer, kicker, good feet ... a very, very talented all-rounder".

A native of Ballymoney, County Antrim, Moore first began playing rugby aged 6 with the minis section of Ballymoney rugby club, though he dropped the sport to play football instead, before returning to rugby at Dalriada School. From there, Moore was brought into the Ulster under-16s setup, and he moved to Ballymena Academy to focus on rugby. He played for Ireland at under-18 and under-19 level, missed out on the 2019 Six Nations Under 20s Championship, where Ireland won a grand slam, due to a serious concussion. He recovered to play in the 2019 World Rugby Under 20 Championship, but dislocated his shoulder against Australia. He played club rugby in the All-Ireland League with Malone, and joined the Ulster academy ahead of the 2018–19 season, while studying biology at Belfast Metropolitan College.

Moore made his senior competitive debut for Ulster while an academy player in their 54–42 defeat against Leinster in the 2018–19 Pro14 on 20 December 2019, and also featured against the Cheetahs in February 2020. He signed a three-year contract with the senior team, as a development player for the first year, ahead of the 2020–21 season. In that first season, he made twelve appearances, including 11 starts, and scored six tries. In 2021–22 he made fourteen appearances, including eight starts. In April 2022 he signed a new contract with Ulster, to run until the summer of 2025. He was selected for the Emerging Ireland squad for the Toyota Challenge in South Africa in September 2022. In November 2025 he joined Newcastle Red Bulls on loan. He scored a hat trick on his debut in the 2025–26 PREM Rugby Cup against Northampton Saints, before being recalled to Ulster to cover for injuries.
