= Cormac Izuchukwu =

Irish rugby union player (born 2000)

- Born: 28 January 2000 (age 26) London, England
- Height: 2.01 m (6 ft 7 in)
- Weight: 118 kg (18.6 st; 260 lb)
- School: Roscrea College

Rugby union career
- Position: Lock, Flanker
Amateur team(s)
Years	Team	Apps	(Points)
–	Kelso RFC		
2022-2024	Ballynahinch	8	(10)
Senior career
Years	Team	Apps	(Points)
2020–	Ulster	60	(60)
- Correct as of 31 October 2026
International career
Years	Team	Apps	(Points)
2022-2024	Emerging Ireland	3	(5)
2024–	Ireland	5	(0)
- Correct as of 11 July 2026
National sevens team
Years	Team		Comps
2019	Ireland 7s		2

Cormac Izuchukwu (born 28 January 2000) is an Irish rugby union player who plays lock for Ulster in the United Rugby Championship and the Ireland national team.

He was born in London to an Irish mother and Nigerian father. He moved to County Offaly when he was 7 where he and his brother and sister were raised by their mother. He started playing rugby with Tullamore RFC in Offaly, before going to Roscrea College, where he played for the first XV in the Leinster Schools Cup quarter-finals. He was offered an opportunity to try out for Connacht at under-19 level, but twisted his ankle and was unable to attend. He signed up to play for Kelso RFC, Scotland as an 18 year old, which included training with Newcastle Falcons.

== Club career ==
He joined the Ulster academy ahead of the 2020–21 season, and made his Ulster debut coming in the 63rd minute of 21―7 victory over Ospreys on 26 February 2021. He played in the subsequent games against Glasgow Warriors and Leinster when he received a yellow card.

He signed a two-year contract with the province in April 2021. He was selected for the Emerging Ireland squad for the Toyota Challenge in South Africa in September 2022. He was a squad player for Ulster under Dan McFarland, but became a regular starter in the back row in the second half of the 2023–24 season under new head coach Richie Murphy,

== International career ==
A highlights video came to the attention of Anthony Eddy at the IRFU, who signed him up for Ireland Sevens. He represented Ireland at two sevens competitions in 2019.

His form saw him called up to the Ireland squad for their two-match 2024 summer tour of South Africa. He went on to make his debut in a 52–17 win against Fiji scoring a try before it was disallowed for a forward pass in the 2024 Autumn Nations Series.
