= Will Reid =

American politician

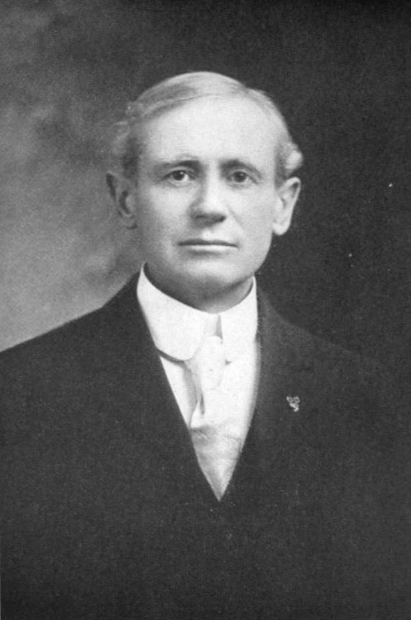

Register of the Cheyenne Federal Land Office
- In office 1913–1921
- Succeeded by: M. T. Christensen

Personal details
- Born: William Reid; September 11, 1858 Milwaukee, Wisconsin, U.S.
- Died: October 31, 1922 (aged 64) Casper, Wyoming, U.S.
- Party: Democratic
- Parents: Thomas Reid (father); Helen Grubb (mother)

William Reid (September 11, 1858 – October 31, 1922) was an American politician, writer, and editor who was a member of the Democratic Party.

== Life ==
William Reid was born on September 11, 1858, in Milwaukee, Wisconsin, to Helen Grubb and Thomas Reid and attended public schools. In 1881 he moved to Rawlins, Wyoming Territory and later moved to Cheyenne in 1913. In 1898 he purchased the Carbon County Journal and later purchased the Battle Lake Miner and the Dillion Doublejack. In the 1920s created the Wyoming Democrat which ceased publication after his death.

In 1904 he was elected as Secretary of the Wyoming Democratic Party. In 1913 he was appointed register of the federal land office at Cheyenne by President Woodrow Wilson and served until 1921. On October 31, 1922, he died in Casper, Wyoming.
