= John Andrew (rugby union, born 1993) =

Irish rugby union player (1993-)

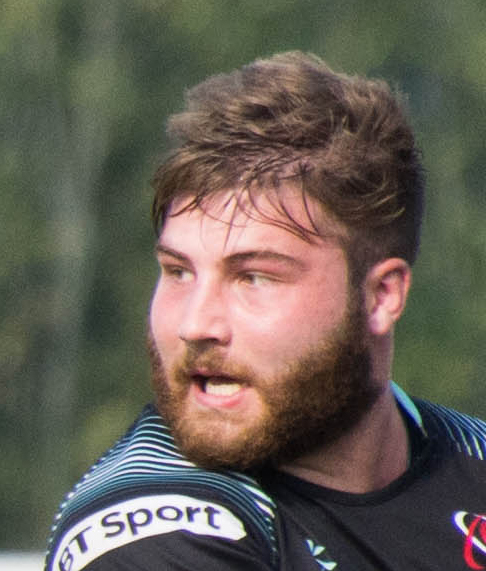
- Born: John Andrew; 26 May 1993 (age 33) Ballymena, Northern Ireland
- Height: 1.8 m (5 ft 11 in)
- Weight: 104 kg (16 st 5 lb)
- School: Ballymena Academy
- Notable relative: Ricky Andrew (brother)

Rugby union career
- Position: Hooker
- Current team: Ulster
Amateur team(s)
Years	Team	Apps	(Points)
2012–	Ballymena		
Senior career
Years	Team	Apps	(Points)
2014–2026	Ulster	161	(100)
- Correct as of 24 April 2026
International career
Years	Team	Apps	(Points)
2013	Ireland U20	5	(0)
- Correct as of 15 March 2013

John Andrew (born 6 May 1993) is an Irish former professional rugby union player who played as a hooker for Ulster from 2014 to 2026, making 161 appearances and scoring 20 tries.

Born in Ballymena, he was part of the Ballymena Academy team that won the Ulster Schools' Cup in 2010. He represented Ireland at under-19 level, and was part of the Ireland squad for the 2013 Six Nations Under 20s Championship, making one start and four appearances from the bench. He came through the Ulster academy system, made his first senior appearance for the province in a friendly against Exeter in August 2014, and signed a development contract in March 2015, and a full senior contract in April 2017. He made his first competitive senior appearance against Ospreys in September 2015, Primarily a backup to Rory Best, and later Rob Herring, he had a strong season in 2020–21, making more appearances than usual and scoring seven tries. He signed a contract extension in January 2021. He made his 100th appearance for Ulster in 2022, away to Munster. He left Ulster at the end of the 2025-26 season, and was named Personality of the Year at the 2026 Ulster Rugby Awards.
