= David Shanahan (rugby union) =

- Born: David Shanahan; 20 June 1993 (age 33) Dublin, Ireland
- Height: 1.75 m (5 ft 9 in)
- Weight: 77 kg (12 st 2 lb)
- School: Belvedere College
- University: Queen's University Belfast

Rugby union career
- Position: Scrum-half
- Current team: Ulster
Amateur team(s)
Years	Team	Apps	(Points)
- Ballymena
2022-23	Malone	2	(12)
Senior career
Years	Team	Apps	(Points)
2013–2026	Ulster	104	(75)
- Correct as of 24 April 2026

David Shanahan (born 20 June 1993) is an Irish professional rugby union player who plays scrum-half for Ulster.

He attended Belvedere College in Dublin, and played for Ireland at U18, U19 and U20 level, but did not win a place in the Leinster academy. Ulster's then forwards coach Allen Clarke, who had coached him at under-age international level, persuaded him to join Ulster's academy, and he was assigned to club side Ballymena while studying at Queen's University Belfast.

He made his debut for Ulster while still in the academy in 2013, and his first start in 2017, in place of the injured Ruan Pienaar. Under previous coach Dan McFarland, he mainly acted as backup to John Cooney.

Ulster describe him as "a livewire scrum-half known for his speed, excellent support lines, and try-scoring ability". Out-half Ian Madigan calls him "Ulster's unsung hero".

He made his 100th appearance for Ulster against Benetton in November 2025. He left Ulster at the end of the 2025-26 season.
