= Callum Reid (rugby union, born 1999) =

Irish rugby union player

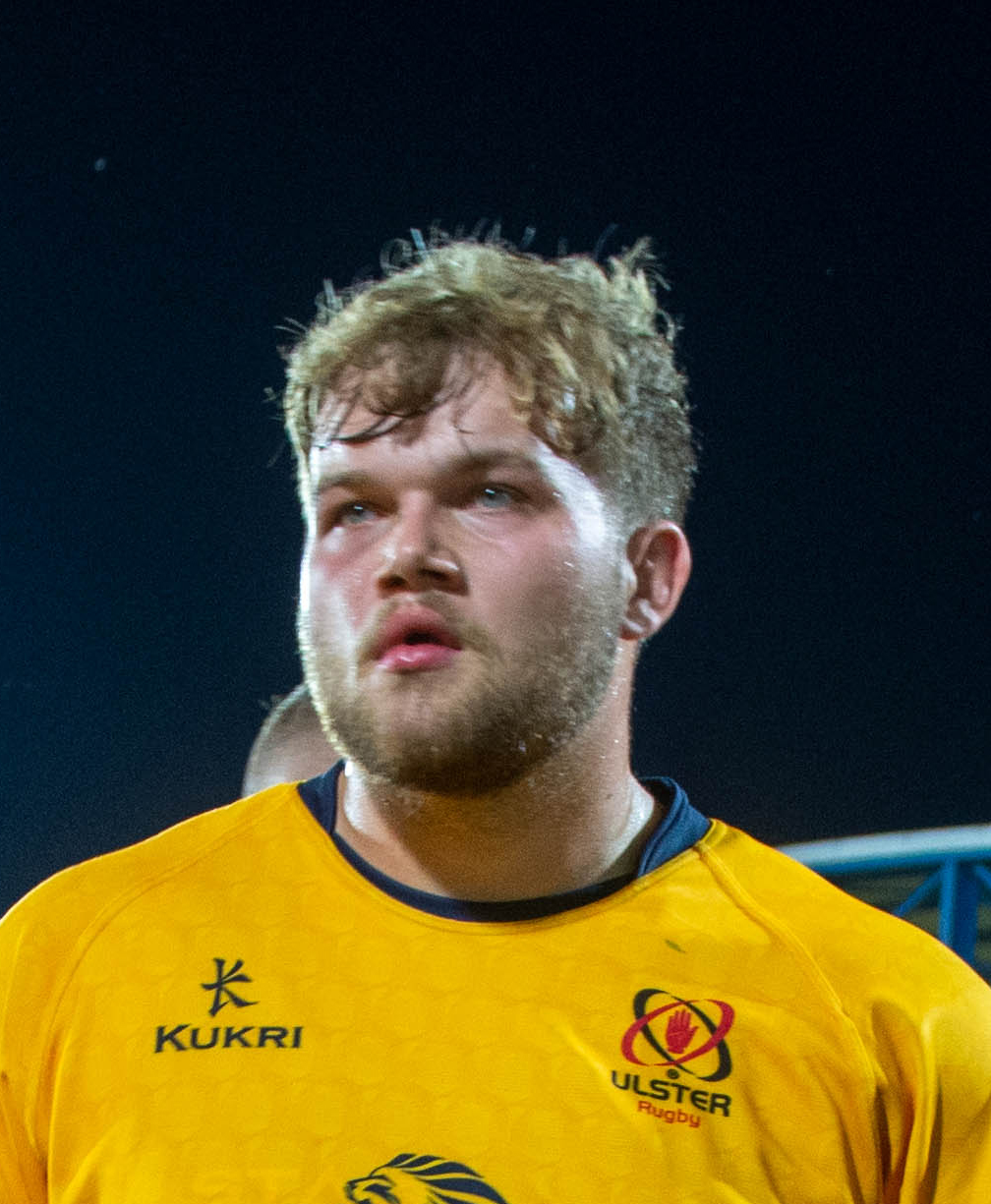
- Callum Reid, 2021
- Born: 16 January 1999 (age 27) Northern Ireland
- Height: 1.83 m (6 ft 0 in)
- Weight: 120 kg (19 st; 260 lb)
- School: Royal Belfast Academical Institution

Rugby union career
- Position: Prop
Amateur team(s)
Years	Team	Apps	(Points)
2021-23	Banbridge	11	(0)
2024-25	City of Armagh	0	(0)
2025-	Instonians	2	(0)
- Correct as of 24 January 2026
Senior career
Years	Team	Apps	(Points)
2020–	Ulster	35	(15)
- Correct as of 24 April 2026
International career
Years	Team	Apps	(Points)
2019	Ireland U20	3	(5)
2022	Emerging Ireland	1	(0)
- Correct as of 15 October 2022

Callum Reid (born 16 January 1999) is an Irish rugby union player who plays loosehead prop for United Rugby Championship side Ulster.

He was part of the Ireland under-20 team that won the Grand Slam in the 2019 Six Nations Under 20s Championship. He played for Banbridge RFC for a season while in the Ulster sub-academy, and joined the academy ahead of the 2019–20 season. He made his Ulster debut in Round 10 of the 2020–21 Pro14 against Munster, making five appearances from the bench during the 2020–21 season, and spent six weeks on loan with Munster. He signed a development contract ahead of the 2021–22 season, and made another five appearances from the bench, including against the Stormers in Cape Town, when he scored a controversially disallowed try. He was selected for the Emerging Ireland squad for the Toyota Challenge in South Africa in September 2022.
