= Aaron Sexton =

Irish rugby union player

- Born: 24 August 2000 (age 26) Bangor, Northern Ireland
- Height: 1.88 m (6 ft 2 in)
- Weight: 94 kg (14.8 st; 207 lb)
- School: Bangor Grammar School

Rugby union career
- Position: Wing / Fullback
Amateur team(s)
Years	Team	Apps	(Points)
2021-23	Malone	16	(60)
2023-	Ballynahinch	13	(50)
Senior career
Years	Team	Apps	(Points)
2020–2024	Ulster	10	(5)
- Correct as of 1 June 2024
International career
Years	Team	Apps	(Points)
2021	Ireland 7s		
- Correct as of 19 June 2021
Medal record
Men's Athletics
Representing Northern Ireland
Commonwealth Youth Games
Gold medal – first place	2017 Nassau	200m

Aaron Sexton (born 24 August 2000) is an Irish former rugby union player who played wing or fullback for Ulster in the United Rugby Championship. As of December 2024, he was participating in the NFL International Player Pathway Program, to attempt to play American Football professionally in the NFL.

== Athletics Career ==
Sexton is also a track sprinter, winning the 2018 and 2019 All-Ireland Schools Championships in both the 100m and 200m, representing Bangor Grammar School. In 2019 Sexton also broke the all-Ireland schools record in both events with times of 10.43 for the 100m and 20.69 for the 200m.

Sexton represented and Ireland came 15th at the 2018 World u20 Athletics Championships in the 200m sprint, and was a part of the Irish 4 × 100 m relay team who finished 11th. the following year Sexton finished 4th at the u20 European Championships in the 200m sprint.

== Rugby Union ==
He played for Ulster "A" in the 2018–19 Celtic Cup, scoring seven tries in six games, and was named Ulster "A" player of the Year in the 2019 Ulster Rugby Awards. He joined the Ulster academy ahead of the 2019–20 season, committing himself full-time to rugby. He made his senior debut as a replacement against Edinburgh in November 2020. In January 2021 he signed a development contract, to be upgraded to a senior contract after one season. He was selected for the Ireland national rugby sevens team for the World Rugby Sevens Repechage in Monaco in July 2021, helping the team qualify for the Tokyo Olympics. He made two senior appearances for Ulster in the 2021–22 season, scoring a try against Cardiff in March 2022.

Sexton left the Province in December 2024 after making 10 appearances, to take part in the NFL International Player Pathway Program for 2025, intending to play as a wide receiver or kick returner. By August 2025, he had returned to Ireland and was playing club rugby for Ballynahinch.
