= Dan McFarland =

English rugby union player & coach (born 1972)

- Born: Daniel Joseph McFarland; 10 April 1972 (age 54) Oxfordshire, England
- Height: 1.85 m (6 ft 1 in)
- Weight: 120 kg (18 st 13 lb)
- School: Ampleforth College
- University: Newcastle University

Rugby union career
- Position: Loosehead prop
- Current team: Newcastle Red Bulls
Senior career
Years	Team	Apps	(Points)
1996–1999	Richmond		
1999–2000	Stade Français		
2000–2006	Connacht		
Coaching career
- Years: Team
- 2006–2015: Connacht (Assistant coach)
- 2007: Ireland U20 (Assistant coach)
- 2014: Emerging Ireland
- 2015: Ireland Wolfhounds
- 2015–2017: Glasgow Warriors (Assistant coach)
- 2017–2018: Scotland (Assistant coach)
- 2018–2024: Ulster (head coach)
- 2024–2026: Kobelco Kobe Steelers (forwards coach)
- 2026-: Newcastle Red Bulls (head coach)
- Correct as of 1 July 2026

Dan McFarland (born 10 April 1972) is an English rugby union coach and former player. He is currently head coach at Newcastle Red Bulls, having previously been forwards coach of Kobelco Kobe Steelers from 2024 to 2026 and head coach of Ulster Rugby from 2018 to 2024.

He played loosehead prop for Richmond, Stade Français and Connacht, retiring in 2006. He was forwards coach, then assistant coach for Connacht from 2007 to 2015, head coach of Emerging Ireland in 2014 and Ireland Wolfhounds in 2015, assistant coach of Glasgow Warriors from 2015 to 2017, and assistant coach of Scotland from 2017 to 2018.

== Family and early life ==
McFarland's grandfather, Danny, came from Belfast, and played rugby for Queen's University before becoming an engineer, working on coal-fired and nuclear power stations in England. His father, Paddy, was born in Rugby, Warwickshire, and won a Blue for rugby at Oxford University before playing for Headlingley and London Irish.

McFarland attended Ampleforth College, North Yorkshire, where he started playing rugby, and studied classics at Newcastle University.

== Playing career ==
McFarland started his senior rugby career at Hull Ionians RUFC, preferring to play in the senior 2nd XV whilst still of age to play for the Colts. At the end of the amateur era, he played loosehead prop for Morley R.F.C. while training to be a teacher. In 1996, he was approached by John Kingston to sign for Richmond, one of the first English clubs to embrace professionalism. He spent a season with Stade Français in 1999-2000, and was part of the team that won the French Championship, before joining Connacht, where he played for six seasons. He became only the second player, after Eric Elwood, to make 100 appearances for the province in 2005, and retired from playing in 2006.

== Coaching career ==
In his final year as a player, he coached the Connacht under-21 team alongside Nigel Carolan. After retiring, he coached County Galway club Monivea to the Connacht Junior League title in 2006-07, and assisted Eric Elwood in coaching Ireland to the Six Nations Under 20s Championship. In 2007 he was appointed Connacht's forwards coach. When Elwood became head coach in 2010, he appointed McFarland as his assistant. He lost out on the head coach's job in 2013 to Pat Lam, but stayed on as Lam's assistant. While coaching at Connacht, he was appointed head coach of the Emerging Ireland team for the 2014 IRB Nations Cup, assisted by Neil Doak, and in 2015 he was head coach of the Ireland Wolfhounds.

In 2015 he took over from Shade Munro as assistant coach at Glasgow Warriors, shortly after the club won the Pro12 for the first time. In May 2017 he was appointed assistant coach of the Scotland national team under Gregor Townsend.

After the resignation of Jono Gibbes as Ulster's head coach at the end of the 2017–18 season, McFarland was announced as his replacement on 30 April 2018. Initially he was to serve his notice with Scotland and join Ulster in January 2019, with Simon Easterby to act as interim head coach until then. But in August, an agreement was reached with Scotland for McFarland to join Ulster before the new season. In his first season, Ulster made the Pro14 semi-final and the European Rugby Champions Cup quarter final. They made the Pro14 final and the Champion's Cup quarter final in 2019–20. In 2020–21 they finished second in Conference B of the Pro14, and made the semi-final of the European Rugby Challenge Cup. In 2021–22 they made the semi-finals of the United Rugby Championship and the round of 16 in the Champions Cup, and McFarland signed a new contract at the end of the season. He stepped down in February 2024 after a run of poor performances. Later that year he joined Japanese club Kobelco Kobe Steelers as forwards coach. In April 2026 it was announced that McFarland would take over as head coach of a new-look Newcastle Red Bulls coaching team.
