= 2020–21 Pro14 =

- Countries: Ireland; Italy; Scotland; Wales
- Date: 2 October 2020 – 28 March 2021
- Champions: Leinster (8th title)
- Runners-up: Munster
- Matches played: 96
- Tries scored: 511 (average 5.3 per match)
- Top point scorer: (Ireland) John Cooney (Ulster); 115 points
- Top try scorer: (South Africa) Marcell Coetzee (Ulster) (Ireland) Scott Penny (Leinster) (Ireland) Alex Wootton (Connacht); 9 tries

Official website
- www.pro14rugby.org

The 2020–21 PRO14 (also known as the Guinness PRO14 for sponsorship reasons) was the twentieth season of the professional rugby union competition originally known as the Celtic League. It was the fourth season to be referred to as the PRO14 (the competition was named the Pro12 immediately prior to the addition of two South African teams).

Twelve teams competed in this season — four Irish teams: Connacht, Leinster, Munster and Ulster; two Italian teams: Benetton and Zebre; two Scottish teams: Edinburgh and Glasgow Warriors; and four Welsh teams: Cardiff Blues, Dragons, Ospreys and Scarlets. Neither of the two South African teams competed this season, with the Cheetahs unable to compete due to the COVID-19 pandemic, and the Southern Kings having entered into voluntary liquidation due to heavy financial losses.

Due to the delays experienced during the 2019–20 season as a result of the COVID-19 pandemic, the 2020–21 season started later than usual on 2 October 2020. Leinster were the defending champions, having defeated Ulster 27–5 in the 2019–20 final to defend their title and complete a hat-trick of title wins.

It was won by Leinster who defeated Munster in the final on 27 March, it was their fourth consecutive Pro14 title and 8th overall.

On 23 December 2020 it was announced that the 2020-21 PRO14 season would conclude on 27 March 2021 after 16 rounds, and will be followed by the Pro14 Rainbow Cup, a competition featuring the four former South African Super Rugby sides, the Bulls, Lions, Sharks and Stormers. The Rainbow Cup would consist of two dual tournaments; one for the northern hemisphere teams and one for the four South African teams. The northern hemisphere tournament will run from 23 April to 19 June 2021.

== Teams ==
| Location of Irish, Scottish and Welsh teams: | Location of Italian teams: |
Conference A; Conference B

| Team | Coach / Director of Rugby | Captain | Stadium/ Stadia | Capacity |
|---|---|---|---|---|
| (Italy) Benetton | (New Zealand) Kieran Crowley | (South Africa) Dewaldt Duvenage | Stadio Comunale di Monigo, Treviso | 6,700 |
| (Wales) Cardiff Blues | (Wales) Dai Young (interim) | (Wales) Ellis Jenkins | Cardiff Arms Park | 12,125 |
| (Ireland) Connacht | (Australia) Andy Friend | (Australia) Jarrad Butler | Galway Sportsgrounds | 8,129 |
| (Wales) Dragons | (England) Dean Ryan | (Wales) Rhodri Williams | Rodney Parade | 8,700 |
| (Scotland) Edinburgh | (England) Richard Cockerill | (Scotland) Stuart McInally | Murrayfield Stadium | 67,144 (Note: Although Murrayfield's full capacity is 67,144, only the lower section of the East Stand, with a capacity of 12,464, is generally opened for Edinburgh fixtures.) |
| (Scotland) Glasgow Warriors | (England) Danny Wilson | (Scotland) Fraser Brown (Scotland) Ryan Wilson | Scotstoun Stadium | 7,351 |
| (Ireland) Leinster | (Ireland) Leo Cullen | (Ireland) Johnny Sexton | RDS Arena; Aviva Stadium | 18,500; 51,700 |
| (Ireland) Munster | (South Africa) Johann van Graan | (Ireland) Peter O'Mahony | Thomond Park; Irish Independent Park | 25,600 (Note: Thomond Park's official capacity is 25,600 but can be expanded up to 26,276 with temporary seating.); 8,008 |
| (Wales) Ospreys | (England) Toby Booth | (Wales) Justin Tipuric | Liberty Stadium | 20,827 |
| (Wales) Scarlets | (New Zealand) Glenn Delaney | (Wales) Ken Owens | Parc y Scarlets | 14,870 |
| (Ireland) Ulster | (England) Dan McFarland | (Ireland) Iain Henderson | Kingspan Stadium | 18,196 |
| (Italy) Zebre | (Ireland) Michael Bradley | (Italy) Tommaso Castello | Stadio Sergio Lanfranchi | 5,000 |

== Competition format ==
League Stage

The twelve teams were split into two conferences of six teams, with each conference featuring two teams from Ireland and Wales plus one team from Italy and Scotland. To ensure a competitive balance, the teams were distributed approximately evenly between the conferences based upon their performance in the previous season.

The regular season consisted of 16 rounds, a home-and-away double round robin with same conference opponents (10 matches), and a home or away tie against each team in the other conference (6 matches). This represented a reduction from previous years, due to a delayed start and in order to make space for the PRO14 Rainbow Cup to be played following the conclusion of the season, which will introduce former Super Rugby teams into the Pro14 competitions.

Final

The top-ranked team in each conference met in the final on 27 March 2021.

Champions Cup Qualification

The organiser of the European Rugby Champions Cup, EPCR, has not yet confirmed the format for the 2021–22 tournament. If the usual qualification rules apply, at least seven PRO14 teams would qualify. The top three teams in each conference would qualify automatically. Previously, the winner of a playoff match between the fourth-ranked eligible teams in each conference became the seventh qualifying team. However, the organiser has confirmed that no play-off game will be used for European qualification this season and that rankings after round 16 will be used to determine which teams will qualify. The seventh qualifying team would be the fourth-ranked team which accumulated the most match points.

It is unclear if there will be any further qualifiers as it will influenced by the format of the 2021-22 tournament and, potentially, the final placings in the 2020-21 Champions Cup and Challenge Cup. In April 2021 EPCR confirmed a 24 team tournament featuring the top 8 teams.

== Team changes ==
=== South Africa ===
Southern Kings entered liquidation in September 2020 and withdrew from the league, while the Cheetahs did not compete due to the COVID-19 pandemic. Following a vote by the South African Rugby Union, the four former South African Super Rugby sides, the Bulls, Lions, Sharks and Stormers, are likely to join an expanded tournament beginning in the 2021–22 season. The future of the Cheetahs is in doubt and they will likely be withdrawn from the PRO14.

== Table ==
2020–21 Pro14 table
Conference A
| | Team | P | W | D | L | PF | PA | PD | TF | TA | TBP | LBP | PTS |
| 1 | (Ireland) Leinster (CH) | 16 | 14 | 0 | 2 | 576 | 285 | +291 | 82 | 33 | 14 | 1 | 71 |
| 2 | (Ireland) Ulster | 16 | 14 | 0 | 2 | 469 | 263 | +206 | 65 | 34 | 8 | 0 | 64 |
| 3 | (Wales) Ospreys | 16 | 8 | 0 | 8 | 301 | 318 | -17 | 34 | 39 | 1 | 3 | 36 |
| 4 | (Scotland) Glasgow Warriors | 16 | 6 | 0 | 10 | 335 | 377 | -42 | 40 | 47 | 2 | 4 | 30 |
| 5 | (Wales) Dragons | 16 | 6 | 0 | 10 | 215 | 394 | -79 | 36 | 50 | 2 | 3 | 29 |
| 6 | (Italy) Zebre | 16 | 4 | 0 | 12 | 237 | 508 | -271 | 22 | 69 | 0 | 1 | 17 |
Conference B
| | Team | P | W | D | L | PF | PA | PD | TF | TA | TBP | LBP | PTS |
| 1 | (Ireland) Munster (RU) | 16 | 14 | 0 | 2 | 413 | 250 | +163 | 49 | 26 | 7 | 2 | 64 |
| 2 | (Ireland) Connacht | 16 | 8 | 0 | 8 | 396 | 353 | +43 | 53 | 36 | 7 | 6 | 45 |
| 3 | (Wales) Scarlets | 16 | 8 | 0 | 8 | 319 | 333 | -14 | 36 | 38 | 3 | 4 | 39 |
| 4 | (Wales) Cardiff Blues | 16 | 8 | 0 | 8 | 265 | 284 | -19 | 30 | 32 | 3 | 1 | 36 |
| 5 | (Scotland) Edinburgh | 16 | 5 | 1 | 10 | 247 | 344 | -97 | 29 | 43 | 1 | 4 | 29* |
| 6 | (Italy) Benetton | 16 | 0 | 1 | 15 | 252 | 415 | -164 | 34 | 53 | 1 | 6 | 7* |
* Cancelled fixture: Edinburgh awarded four match points.
If teams are level at any stage, tiebreakers are applied in the following order: 1. number of matches won 2. the difference between points for and points against 3. the number of tries scored 4. the most points scored 5. the difference between tries for and tries against 6. the fewest red cards received 7. the fewest yellow cards received
Green background indicates teams that will compete in the Pro14 Final, and also earn a place in the 2021–22 European Champions Cup Blue background indicates teams outside the play-off places that earn a place in the 2021–22 European Champions Cup; Plain background indicates teams that earn a place in the 2021–22 European Rugby Challenge Cup. (CH) Champions. (RU) Runners-up. (PO) Champions Cup play-off winners.

== Rounds 1 to 16 ==
Fixtures for the first 11 rounds of matches were announced on 23 September 2020. Several matches were scheduled on Monday nights to avoid clashes with the extended international calendar. The remaining fixtures for rounds 12 to 16 were confirmed on 25 January 2021.

All times are local.

=== Round 1 ===
2 October 2020
19:00

| Zebre (Italy) | 6–16 | (Wales) Cardiff Blues |

Stadio Sergio Lanfranchi
Referee: George Clancy

2 October 2020
20:15

| (1 BP) Ulster (Ireland) | 35–24 | (Italy) Benetton |
| Try: Hume 8' c Moore 11' c Lowry 28' c Coetzee 46' c McBurney 73' c Con: Cooney (4) 9' 12' 30' 47'; Johnston 74' | Report; Highlights | Try: Ruzza 23' c Garbisi 32' c Steyn 38' c Con: Garbisi (3) 24' 33' 39'; Pen: Garbisi 43' |

Kingspan Stadium
Referee: Adam Jones

2 October 2020
20:15

| (1 BP) Leinster (Ireland) | 35–5 | (Wales) Dragons |

RDS Arena
Referee: Andrea Piardi

3 October 2020
15:00

| (1 BP) Scarlets (Wales) | 27–30 | (Ireland) Munster |

Parc y Scarlets
Referee: Sam Grove-White

3 October 2020
17:15

| Connacht (Ireland) | 28–24 | (Scotland) Glasgow Warriors (1 BP) |

Galway Sportsgrounds
Referee: Craig Evans

3 October 2020
19:35

| Edinburgh (Scotland) | 10–25 | (Wales) Ospreys |

Murrayfield
Referee: Andrew Brace

=== Round 2 ===
9 October 2020
20:15

| (1 BP) Dragons (Wales) | 26–18 | (Italy) Zebre |

Rodney Parade
Referee: Chris Busby

10 October 2020
17:15

| Ospreys (Wales) | 12–24 | (Ireland) Ulster |
| Pen: Myler (4) 21' 40+1' 57' 65' | Report; Highlights | Try: Stockdale 7' c Coetzee 48' c Cooney 72'; Con: Cooney (3) 8' 49' 73'; Pen: Cooney 31' |

Liberty Stadium
Referee: Mike Adamson

10 October 2020
18:15

| Benetton (Italy) | 25–37 | (Ireland) Leinster (1 BP) |

Stadio Comunale di Monigo
Referee: Ben Whitehouse

10 October 2020
19:35

| Munster (Ireland) | 25–23 | (Scotland) Edinburgh (1 BP) |

Thomond Park
Referee: Nigel Owens

10 October 2020
19:35

| (1 BP) Cardiff Blues (Wales) | 29–7 | (Ireland) Connacht |

Rodney Parade
Referee: Gianluca Gnecchi

11 October 2020
17:15

| Glasgow Warriors (Scotland) | 20–7 | (Wales) Scarlets |

Scotstoun Stadium
Referee: Frank Murphy

=== Round 3 ===
23 October 2020
19:35

| (1 BP) Leinster (Ireland) | 63–8 | (Italy) Zebre |

RDS Arena
Referee: Craig Evans

23 October 2020
21:15

| (1 BP) Benetton (Italy) | 3–10 | (Wales) Scarlets |

Stadio Comunale di Monigo
Referee: Andrew Brace

24 October 2020
17:30

| Ospreys (Wales) | 23–15 | (Scotland) Glasgow Warriors |

Liberty Stadium
Referee: George Clancy

25 October 2020
15:00

| (1 BP) Ulster (Ireland) | 40–17 | (Wales) Dragons |
| Try: Coetzee 4' c O'Sullivan 13' c Reidy 26' c Ludik (2) 31' c 38' c O'Connor 66'; Con: Cooney (5) 5' 15' 27' 32' 39' | Report; Highlights | Try: Hewitt 60' c Roberts 80' c Con: Davies (2) 61' 80+1'; Pen: Davies 9' |

Kingspan Stadium
Referee: Gianluca Gnecchi

25 October 2020
19:35

| (1 BP) Edinburgh (Scotland) | 26–37 | (Ireland) Connacht (1 BP) |

Murrayfield
Referee: Adam Jones

26 October 2020
20:15

| (1 BP) Munster (Ireland) | 38–27 | (Wales) Cardiff Blues |

Thomond Park
Referee: Andrea Piardi

=== Round 4 ===
1 November 2020
14:00

| Dragons (Wales) | 16–28 | (Ireland) Munster |

Rodney Parade
Referee: Aled Evans

1 November 2020
18:45

| (1 BP) Scarlets (Wales) | 3–6 | (Scotland) Edinburgh |

Parc y Scarlets
Referee: Nigel Owens

2 November 2020
18:00

| (1 BP) Cardiff Blues (Wales) | 7–11 | (Ireland) Ulster |
| Try: Lee-Lo 22' c Con: Evans 23' | Report; Highlights | Try: Lowry 40+1'; Pen: Cooney (2) 16' 64' |

Rodney Parade
Referee: Adam Jones

2 November 2020
20:15

| Zebre (Italy) | 23–17 | (Wales) Ospreys (1 BP) |

Stadio Sergio Lanfranchi
Referee: Gianluca Gnecchi

2 November 2020
20:15

| Glasgow Warriors (Scotland) | 19–32 | (Ireland) Leinster (1 BP) |

Scotstoun Stadium
Referee: Duncan McClement

=== Round 5 ===
8 November 2020
15:00

| Ospreys (Wales) | 7–26 | (Ireland) Leinster (1 BP) |

Liberty Stadium
Referee: Sam Grove-White

8 November 2020
17:15

| Scarlets (Wales) | 18–17 | (Italy) Zebre (1 BP) |

Parc y Scarlets
Referee: Craig Evans

9 November 2020
19:45

| Edinburgh (Scotland) | 18–0 | (Wales) Cardiff Blues |

Murrayfield
Referee: Andrew Brace

9 November 2020
20:15

| (1 BP) Ulster (Ireland) | 40–15 | (Scotland) Glasgow Warriors |
| Try: Andrew 11' c Coetzee 24' c Carter 36' c Cooney 40+2' c Reidy 49'; Faddes 55' c Con: Cooney (5) 12' 25' 37' 40+3' 56' | Report; Highlights | Try: Ioane 4' c Stewart 60'; Con: Horne 4'; Pen: Horne 20' |

Kingspan Stadium
Referee: Nigel Owens

=== Round 6 ===
14 November 2020
19:35

| (1 BP) Connacht (Ireland) | 14–20 | (Wales) Scarlets |

Galway Sportsgrounds
Referee: Sam Grove-White

15 November 2020
14:45

| (1 BP) Munster (Ireland) | 38–22 | (Wales) Ospreys |

Thomond Park
Referee: George Clancy

16 November 2020
19:00

| Zebre (Italy) | 14–57 | (Ireland) Ulster (1 BP) |
| Try: Bruno 10' c Casilio 53' c Con: Rizzi 10'; Pescetto 54' | Report; Highlights | Try: Coetzee (4) 5' c 24' c 35' c 58; Moore 28'; Johnston 45' c Marshall 49' c McIlroy 74'; Shanahan 79' c Con: Johnston (6) 6' 25' 36' 47' 50' 80' |

Stadio Sergio Lanfranchi
Referee: Ben Whitehouse

16 November 2020
19:45

| Cardiff Blues (Wales) | 22–5 | (Italy) Benetton |

Rodney Parade
Referee: Frank Murphy

16 November 2020
20:15

| (1 BP) Leinster (Ireland) | 50–10 | (Scotland) Edinburgh |

RDS Arena
Referee: Craig Evans

=== Round 7 ===
22 November 2020
13:45

| Ospreys (Wales) | 24–22 | (Italy) Benetton (1 BP) |

St. Helen's
Referee: Aled Evans

22 November 2020
15:30

| Zebre (Italy) | 12–47 | (Ireland) Connacht (1 BP) |

Stadio Sergio Lanfranchi
Referee: Daniel Jones

22 November 2020
17:15

| (1 BP) Leinster (Ireland) | 40–5 | (Wales) Cardiff Blues |

RDS Arena
Referee: Mike Adamson

22 November 2020
19:35

| (1 BP) Ulster (Ireland) | 24–22 | (Wales) Scarlets (2 BP) |
| Try: Lyttle 6'; Moore 30' c Reidy 39' c Treadwell 64' c Con: Cooney (2) 32' 40'; Johnston 65' | Report; Highlights | Try: Asquith 17' c Conbeer 41'; Evans 54'; Price 76' c Con: O'Brien (2) 18', 77' |

Kingspan Stadium
Referee: Andrea Piardi

23 November 2020
20:15

| Glasgow Warriors (Scotland) | 13–27 | (Ireland) Munster (1 BP) |

Scotstoun Stadium
Referee: Adam Jones

=== Round 8 ===
29 November 2020
17:00

| (1 BP) Benetton (Italy) | 19–26 | (Wales) Dragons |

Stadio Comunale di Monigo
Referee: Sean Gallagher

29 November 2020
19:35

| Cardiff Blues (Wales) | 10–19 | (Scotland) Glasgow Warriors |

Rodney Parade
Referee: Frank Murphy

30 November 2020
20:15

| Edinburgh (Scotland) | 14–43 | (Ireland) Ulster (1 BP) |
| Try: Blain (2) 32' c 44' c Con: Chamberlain (2) 34' 45' | Report; Highlights | Try: Moore 2' c Andrew (3) 18' 72' 80@1'; Cooney (2) 23' c 66' c Murphy 59' c Con: Cooney (4) 3' 24' 60' 68' |

BT Murrayfield
Referee: Craig Evans

30 November 2020
20:15

| (1 BP) Munster (Ireland) | 52–3 | (Italy) Zebre |

Thomond Park
Referee: Andrew Brace

=== Round 4 (rescheduled match) ===
4 December 2020
19:35

| (1 BP) Connacht (Ireland) | 31–14 | (Italy) Benetton |

Galway Sportsgrounds
Referee: Eoghan Cross

=== Round 6 (rescheduled match) ===
5 December 2020
19:15

| (1 BP) Glasgow Warriors (Scotland) | 22–23 | (Wales) Dragons |

Scotstoun Stadium
Referee: Chris Busby

=== Round 9 ===
26 December 2020
15:00

| (1 BP) Dragons (Wales) | 12–13 | (Wales) Cardiff Blues |

Rodney Parade
Referee: Craig Evans

26 December 2020
17:15

| (1 BP) Ospreys (Wales) | 14–16 | (Wales) Scarlets |

Parc y Scarlets (Note: Although this fixture will count as an Ospreys home match, the match was played at Parc y Scarlets. The Liberty Stadium was unavailable due to urgent work needed to relay the playing surface.)
Referee: Adam Jones

27 December 2020
19:35

| Connacht (Ireland) | 19–32 | (Ireland) Ulster |
| Try: Carty 20' c Porch 27' c Daly 61'; Con: Carty (2) 21' 28' | Report; Highlights | Try: Murphy 48' c Timoney 53' c Con: Madigan (2) 49' 55'; Pen: Madigan (6) 2' 10' 24' 65' 74' 78' |

Galway Sportsgrounds
Referee: Sean Gallagher

=== Round 10 ===
1 January 2021
17:15

| Scarlets (Wales) | 20–3 | (Wales) Dragons |

Parc y Scarlets
Referee: Nigel Owens

1 January 2021
19:35

| Cardiff Blues (Wales) | 3–17 | (Wales) Ospreys |

Cardiff City Stadium
Referee: Ben Whitehouse

2 January 2021
14:00

| Benetton (Italy) | 15–24 | (Italy) Zebre |

Stadio Comunale di Monigo
Referee: Andrea Piardi

2 January 2021
17:15

| Ulster (Ireland) | 15–10 | (Ireland) Munster (1 BP) |
| Try: Faddes 6'; McIlroy 16' c Con: Cooney 17'; Pen: Cooney 28' | Report; Highights | Try: Sweetnam 80+2'; Con: Crowley 80+4'; Pen: Healy 12' |

Kingspan Stadium
Referee: Mike Adamson

2 January 2021
19:35

| (1 BP) Leinster (Ireland) | 24–35 | (Ireland) Connacht (1 BP) |

RDS Arena
Referee: Chris Busby

==== 1872 Cup 1st round ====
2 January 2021
15:00

| Edinburgh (Scotland) | 10–7 | (Scotland) Glasgow Warriors (1 BP) |

BT Murrayfield
Referee: Sam Grove-White

=== Round 9 (rescheduled match) ===
9 January 2021
14:00

| Zebre (Italy) | 22–18 | (Italy) Benetton (1 BP) |

Stadio Sergio Lanfranchi
Referee: Federico Vedovelli

=== Round 11 ===
8 January 2021
19:35

| (1 BP) Leinster (Ireland) | 24–12 | (Ireland) Ulster |
| Try: Kearney 22'; Cronin 43' c Henshaw 52'; Tracy 73' c Con: Sexton 44'; Byrne 75' | Report; Highlights | Pen: Cooney (4) 14' 34' 40' 69' |

RDS Arena
Referee: Andrew Brace

9 January 2021
17:15

| Dragons (Wales) | 20–28 | (Wales) Ospreys |

Rodney Parade
Referee: Daniel Jones

9 January 2021
19:35

| (1 BP) Connacht (Ireland) | 10–16 | (Ireland) Munster |

Galway Sportsgrounds
Referee: Frank Murphy

9 January 2021
19:35

| Cardiff Blues (Wales) | 29–20 | (Wales) Scarlets |

Cardiff City Stadium
Referee: Craig Evans

=== Round 9 (rescheduled match) ===
==== 1872 Cup 2nd round ====
16 January 2021
17:15

| Glasgow Warriors (Scotland) | 23–22 | (Scotland) Edinburgh (1 BP) |

Scotstoun Stadium
Referee: Mike Adamson

=== Round 14 (rescheduled match) ===
22 January 2021
20:00

| (1 BP) Scarlets (Wales) | 10–13 | (Wales) Cardiff Blues |

Parc y Scarlets
Referee: Adam Jones

=== Round 11 (rescheduled match) ===
23 January 2021
14:00

| Zebre (Italy) | 10–26 | (Scotland) Edinburgh |

Stadio Sergio Lanfranchi
Referee: Gianluca Gnecchi

=== Round 9 (rescheduled match) ===
23 January 2021
19:35

| (1 BP) Munster (Ireland) | 10–13 | (Ireland) Leinster |

Thomond Park
Referee: Andrew Brace

=== Round 8 (rescheduled match) ===
24 January 2021
15:00

| (1 BP) Connacht (Ireland) | 20–26 | (Wales) Ospreys (1 BP) |

Galway Sportsgrounds
Referee: Frank Murphy

=== Round 5 (rescheduled match) ===
30 January 2021
18:00

| (1 BP) Benetton (Italy) | 16–18 | (Ireland) Munster |

Stadio Comunale di Monigo
Referee: Andrea Piardi

=== Round 8 (rescheduled match) ===
30 January 2021
19:35

| Scarlets (Wales) | 25–52 | (Ireland) Leinster (1 BP) |

Parc y Scarlets
Referee: Mike Adamson

=== Round 5 (rescheduled match) ===
5 February 2021
19:35

| Dragons (Wales) | 20–30 | (Ireland) Connacht (1 BP) |

Rodney Parade
Referee: Craig Evans

=== Round 12 ===
19 February 2021
19:35

| (1 BP) Glasgow Warriors (Scotland) | 13–19 | (Ireland) Ulster |
| Try: Seiuli 76' c Con: Thompson 77'; Pen: Hastings (2) 36' 50' | Report; Highlights | Try: Lowry 39' c Gilroy 55'; Timoney 62' c Con: Cooney (2) 40' 63' |

Scotstoun Stadium
Referee: Ben Blain

19 February 2021
19:35

| (1 BP) Dragons (Wales) | 29–35 | (Ireland) Leinster (1 BP) |

Rodney Parade
Referee: Ben Whitehouse

20 February 2021
15:00

| (1 BP) Scarlets (Wales) | 41–17 | (Italy) Benetton |

Parc y Scarlets
Referee: Daniel Jones

20 February 2021
17:15

| Ospreys (Wales) | 10–0 | (Italy) Zebre |

Liberty Stadium
Referee: Nigel Owens

20 February 2021
19:35

| Edinburgh (Scotland) | 10–22 | (Ireland) Munster |

Murrayfield
Referee: Mike Adamson

20 February 2021
19:35

| (1 BP) Connacht (Ireland) | 32–17 | (Wales) Cardiff Blues |

Galway Sportsgrounds
Referee: Andrew Brace

=== Round 13 ===
26 February 2021
17:30

| (1 BP) Benetton (Italy) | 17–19 | (Ireland) Connacht |

Stadio Comunale di Monigo
Referee: Marius Mitrea

26 February 2021
20:00

| Cardiff Blues (Wales) | 11–20 | (Ireland) Munster |

Cardiff Arms Park
Referee: Adam Jones

26 February 2021
20:00

| Ulster (Ireland) | 21–7 | (Wales) Ospreys |
| Try: Cooney 37' c Andrew 53' c Con: Cooney (2) 39' 54' | Report; Highlights | Try: Giles 1' c Con: Myler 3' |

Kingspan Stadium
Referee: Sean Gallagher

27 February 2021
12:00

| (1 BP) Edinburgh (Scotland) | 25–27 | (Wales) Scarlets |

Murrayfield
Referee: Ben Blain

27 February 2021
17:15

| Zebre (Italy) | 26–15 | (Wales) Dragons |

Stadio Sergio Lanfranchi
Referee: Gianluca Gnecchi

28 February 2021
17:30

| (1 BP) Leinster (Ireland) | 40–21 | (Scotland) Glasgow Warriors |

RDS Arena
Referee: Frank Murphy

=== Round 14 ===
5 March 2021
19:35

| Munster (Ireland) | 20–17 | (Ireland) Connacht (1 BP) |

Thomond Park
Referee: Chris Busby

6 March 2021
13:00

| Zebre (Italy) | 20–31 | (Scotland) Glasgow Warriors (1 BP) |

Stadio Sergio Lanfranchi
Referee: Andrea Piardi

6 March 2021
19:35

| Ospreys (Wales) | 20–31 | (Wales) Dragons (1 BP) |

Brewery Field
Referee: Craig Evans

6 March 2021
19:35

| Ulster (Ireland) | 19–38 | (Ireland) Leinster (1 BP) |
| Try: Coetzee 8' c Baloucoune 13'; Timoney 72' c Con: Cooney 10'; Lowry 73' | Report; Highlights | Try: Bent 24' c Van der Flier 27' c E. Byrne 36' c Ruddock 56' c Sheehan 78' c Con: R. Byrne (5) 25' 28' 38' 57' 79'; Pen: R. Byrne 4' |

Kingspan Stadium
Referee: Frank Murphy

7 March 2021
15:15

| Edinburgh (Scotland) | Cancelled; 0–0 | (Italy) Benetton |

Murrayfield

- Postponed due to the COVID-19 pandemic. Edinburgh were awarded four match points.

=== Round 15 ===
12 March 2021
17:45

| Zebre (Italy) | 31–48 | (Ireland) Leinster (1 BP) |

Stadio Sergio Lanfranchi
Referee: Marius Mitrea

12 March 2021
20:00

| (1 BP) Munster (Ireland) | 28–10 | (Wales) Scarlets |

Thomond Park
Referee: Sean Gallagher

12 March 2021
20:00

| Glasgow Warriors (Scotland) | 30–25 | (Wales) Ospreys (1 BP) |

Scotstoun Stadium
Referee: Sam Grove-White

13 March 2021
19:35

| (1 BP) Dragons (Wales) | 22–26 | (Ireland) Ulster (1 BP) |
| Try: Griffiths 55' c Dyer 73'; Holmes 77' c Con: Davies 55'; Lewis 77'; Pen: Davies 34' | Report; Highlights | Try: Mathewson 13' c Moore (2) 20' c 60' c Andrew 49'; Con: Lowry (3) 14' 22' 61' |

Millennium Stadium
Referee: Adam Jones

13 March 2021
19:35

| (1 BP) Connacht (Ireland) | 14–15 | (Scotland) Edinburgh |

Galway Sportsgrounds
Referee: Chris Busby

14 March 2021
13:00

| Benetton (Italy) | 14–29 | (Wales) Cardiff Blues (1 BP) |

Stadio Comunale di Monigo
Referee: Gianluca Gnecchi

=== Round 16 ===
19 March 2021
18:00

| (1 BP) Munster (Ireland) | 31–17 | (Italy) Benetton |

Thomond Park
Referee: Hollie Davidson

19 March 2021
20:15

| (1 BP) Ulster (Ireland) | 49–3 | (Italy) Zebre |
| Try: Andrew 12' c Lowry 38' c Baloucoune 42 c Murphy (2) 44' c 60' c Lyttle 66' c Roberts 78' c Con: Cooney (4) 14' 39' 43' 45'; Lowry (3) 61' 67' 79' | Report; Highlights | Pen: Paolo Pescetto 15' |

Kingspan Stadium
Referee: Andrew Brace

19 March 2021
20:15

| (1 BP) Leinster (Ireland) | 19–24 | (Wales) Ospreys |

RDS Arena
Referee: Chris Busby

21 March 2021
15:00

| Dragons (Wales) | 26–17 | (Scotland) Glasgow Warriors |

Millennium Stadium
Referee: Daniel Jones

22 March 2021
20:00

| (1 BP) Cardiff Blues (Wales) | 34–15 | (Scotland) Edinburgh |

Cardiff Arms Park
Referee: Nigel Owens

22 March 2021
20:00

| (1 BP) Scarlets (Wales) | 41–36 | (Ireland) Connacht (2 BP) |

Parc y Scarlets
Referee: Ben Whitehouse

=== Round 11 (rescheduled match) ===
27 March 2021
13:45

| (1 BP) Glasgow Warriors (Scotland) | 46–25 | (Italy) Benetton (1 BP) |

Scotstoun Stadium
Referee: Frank Murphy

=== Round 7 (rescheduled match) ===
28 March 2021
14:00

| Dragons (Wales) | 24–17 | (Scotland) Edinburgh (1 BP) |

Millennium Stadium
Referee: Craig Evans

== Play-offs ==
=== Final ===
27 March 2021
17:00

| Leinster (Ireland) | 16–6 | (Ireland) Munster |

RDS Arena
Referee: Mike Adamson

== Referees ==
Pro14 2018–19 14-man referee elite squad: (number of matches refereed):

- (Scotland) Mike Adamson (SRU) – (21)
- (South Africa) Stuart Berry (SARU) – (14)
- (Ireland) Andrew Brace (IRFU) – (35)
- (Ireland) George Clancy (IRFU) – (102)
- (Wales) Ian Davies (WRU) – (72)
- (Ireland) Sean Gallagher (IRFU) – (9)
- (South Africa) Quinton Immelman (SARU) – (10)
- (Wales) Dan Jones (WRU) – (14)
- (Ireland) John Lacey (IRFU) – (70)
- (Scotland) Lloyd Linton (SRU) – (21)
- (Italy) Marius Mitrea (FIR) – (78)
- (Ireland) Frank Murphy (IRFU) – (14)
- (Italy) Andrea Piardi (FIR) – (1)
- (Wales) Nigel Owens (WRU) – (166)
- (Wales) Ben Whitehouse (WRU) – (46)

Note: Additional referees are used throughout the season, selected from a select development squad.

== Attendances by club ==
| Club | Home games | Total | Average | Highest | Lowest | % Capacity |
|---|---|---|---|---|---|---|
| (Italy) Benetton | 0 | 0 | 0 | 0 | 0 | 0% |
| (Wales) Cardiff Blues | 0 | 0 | 0 | 0 | 0 | 0% |
| (Ireland) Connacht | 0 | 0 | 0 | 0 | 0 | 0% |
| (Wales) Dragons | 0 | 0 | 0 | 0 | 0 | 0% |
| (Scotland) Edinburgh | 0 | 0 | 0 | 0 | 0 | 0% |
| (Scotland) Glasgow Warriors | 0 | 0 | 0 | 0 | 0 | 0% |
| (Ireland) Leinster | 0 | 0 | 0 | 0 | 0 | 0% |
| (Ireland) Munster | 0 | 0 | 0 | 0 | 0 | 0% |
| (Wales) Ospreys | 0 | 0 | 0 | 0 | 0 | 0% |
| (Wales) Scarlets | 0 | 0 | 0 | 0 | 0 | 0% |
| (Ireland) Ulster | 0 | 0 | 0 | 0 | 0 | 0% |
| (Italy) Zebre | 0 | 0 | 0 | 0 | 0 | 0% |

== End of Season Awards ==
=== PRO14 Dream Team ===
The 2020–21 Pro14 Dream team is:

| Pos | | Player | Team |
|---|---|---|---|
| FB | 15 | (Ireland) Michael Lowry | (Ireland) Ulster |
| RW | 14 | (Ireland) Alex Wootton | (Ireland) Connacht |
| OC | 13 | (Scotland) Huw Jones | (Scotland) Glasgow Warriors |
| IC | 12 | (South Africa) Damian de Allende | (Ireland) Munster |
| LW | 11 | (Ireland) Dave Kearney | (Ireland) Leinster |
| FH | 10 | (Ireland) Jack Carty | (Ireland) Connacht |
| SH | 9 | (Ireland) John Cooney | (Ireland) Ulster |
| N8 | 8 | (South Africa) Marcell Coetzee | (Ireland) Ulster |
| OF | 7 | (Ireland) Scott Penny | (Ireland) Leinster |
| BF | 6 | (Wales) Josh Turnbull | (Wales) Cardiff Blues |
| RL | 5 | (Ireland) Gavin Thornbury | (Ireland) Connacht |
| LL | 4 | (Ireland) Billy Holland | (Ireland) Munster |
| TP | 3 | (Ireland) Michael Bent | (Ireland) Leinster |
| HK | 2 | (Ireland) Kevin O'Byrne | (Ireland) Munster |
| LP | 1 | (Ireland) Eric O'Sullivan | (Ireland) Ulster |

=== Award winners ===
The 2020–21 Pro14 award winners were:

| Award | Winner |
|---|---|
| Players' Player of the Season | (South Africa) Marcell Coetzee (Ulster) |
| Next-Gen Star of the Season | (Ireland) Scott Penny (Leinster) |
| Chairman's Award | (Italy) Dr. Vincenzo Ieracitano (FIR) (Ireland) Dr. Rod McLoughlin (IRFU) (Scotland) Dr. Michael Dunlop (Edinburgh) (Scotland) Dr. James Robson (SRU) (South Africa) Clint Readhead (SARU) (Wales) Prav Mathema (WRU) |
| Golden Boot | (England) Stephen Myler (Ospreys) |
| Top Try Scorer | (South Africa) Marcell Coetzee (Ulster) (Ireland) Scott Penny (Leinster Rugby) (Ireland) Alex Wootton (Conancht) |
| Tackle Machine | (South Africa) Brok Harris (Dragons) |
| Turnover King | (South Africa) Chris Cloete (Munster) |
| Ironman Award | (Wales) Ashton Hewitt (Dragons) |

== Leading scorers ==
Note: Flags to the left of player names indicate national team as has been defined under World Rugby eligibility rules, or primary nationality for players who have not yet earned international senior caps. Players may hold one or more non-WR nationalities.

=== Most points ===
As of 28 March 2021

| Rank | Player | Club | Points |
|---|---|---|---|
| 1 | (Ireland) John Cooney | (Ireland) Ulster | 115 |
| 2 | (Wales) Sam Davies | (Wales) Dragons | 113 |
| 3 | (Ireland) Jack Carty | (Ireland) Connacht | 102 |
| 4 | (Wales) Jarrod Evans | (Wales) Cardiff Blues | 94 |
| 4 | (England) Stephen Myler | (Wales) Ospreys | 94 |
| 6 | (Ireland) Harry Byrne | (Ireland) Leinster | 91 |
| 7 | (Ireland) JJ Hanrahan | (Ireland) Munster | 85 |
| 8 | (Ireland) Ben Healy | (Ireland) Munster | 77 |
| 9 | (Italy) Antonio Rizzi | (Italy) Zebre | 68 |
| 10 | (Scotland) Jaco van der Walt | (Scotland) Edinburgh | 66 |

=== Most tries ===
As of 28 March 2021

| Rank | Player | Club | Tries |
|---|---|---|---|
| 1 | (South Africa) Marcell Coetzee | (Ireland) Ulster | 9 |
| 1 | (Ireland) Scott Penny | (Ireland) Leinster | 9 |
| 1 | (Ireland) Alex Wootton | (Ireland) Connacht | 9 |
| 4 | (Ireland) Gavin Coombes | (Ireland) Munster | 8 |
| 4 | (Ireland) Dave Kearney | (Ireland) Leinster | 8 |
| 6 | (Ireland) John Andrew | (Ireland) Ulster | 7 |
| 6 | (Ireland) Luke McGrath | (Ireland) Leinster | 7 |
| 8 | (Wales) Dane Blacker | (Wales) Scarlets | 6 |
| 8 | (Wales) Jonah Holmes | (Wales) Dragons | 6 |
| 8 | (Ireland) Cian Kelleher | (Ireland) Leinster | 6 |
| 8 | (Ireland) Stewart Moore | (Ireland) Ulster | 6 |
| 8 | (Ireland) Dan Sheehan | (Ireland) Leinster | 6 |
