= 2021–22 Ulster Rugby season =

Provincial Rugby Union team season

Ulster Rugby
- 2021–22 season
- Head Coach: Dan McFarland
- Operations Director: Bryn Cunningham
- Captain: Iain Henderson; Alan O'Connor; Nick Timoney
- United Rugby Championship: Semi-final
- European Rugby Champions Cup: Round of 16
- Top try scorer: League: Nick Timoney (7); All: Robert Baloucoune (11)
- Top points scorer: League: Nathan Doak (109); All: Nathan Doak (132)
Home colours	Away colours	Third colours

The 2021–22 season was Ulster Rugby's 28th season since the advent of professionalism in rugby union, and Dan McFarland's fourth season as head coach. They competed in the inaugural United Rugby Championship (successor competition to the Pro14) and the European Rugby Champions Cup.

The major new signing was South African number eight Duane Vermeulen. Ulster finished third in the URC, and second in the Irish Shield, qualifying for the playoffs and for next season's Champions Cup. They beat Munster at home in the quarter-final, but went out in the semi-final to the Stormers in Cape Town. Lock Alan O'Connor won the URC Tackle Machine award, and flanker Nick Timoney and centre James Hume were named in the league's Dream Team. Ulster won all four of their pool games in the Champions Cup, finishing second and qualifying for a two-legged round of sixteen playoff against Toulouse, which they lost by an aggregate score of 49–50. Fullback Michael Lowry was nominated for European Player of the Year and made his debut for Ireland. James Hume was Ulster's Player of the Year.

Ulster used 46 players this season, compared to Leinster with 60, Munster with 59 and Connacht with 46. Alan O'Connor, Billy Burns and Nick Timoney made the most appearances for the province, each appearing in 24 out of 26 games. Robert Baloucoune was top try scorer with 11. Nick Timoney was RTÉ's choice for Ulster's player of the season, and Andrew Warwick was their most underrated player. Nathan Doak had a breakthrough season, deputising for the injured John Cooney as scrum-half and goal kicker, and finishing the season the team's leading scorer with 132 points.

== Sponsorship ==
British government minister Michael Gove wrote to Ulster in December, urging the team to end their relationship with principal sponsor Kingspan, after the firm was criticised by the inquiry into the Grenfell Tower fire for supplying some of the insulation materials involved. This led to protests outside Ravenhill before Ulster's Champions Cup game against Clermont in January 2022.

== Men's season ==
=== Personnel changes ===
Assistant coach Dwayne Peel left in the off-season to become head coach of Scarlets. Skills coach Dan Soper was promoted to assistant, and Craig Newby joined as the new skills coach. Gavin Hogg, formerly rugby development officer, became the new academy manager, assisted by Willie Faloon as elite performance development officer.

After the departure of Marcell Coetzee last season, Ulster attempted to sign Fijian forward Leone Nakarawa, but the move fell through following a medical report. As the season began, Ulster announced the signing of South African number 8 Duane Vermeulen, who would join the squad in November after the autumn internationals. Other new arrivals were lock Mick Kearney, signed from Zebre Parma, and hooker Declan Moore, signed from Munster as short-term injury cover.

Joining the senior squad from the academy on development contracts were wing Aaron Sexton, scrum-half Nathan Doak, hooker Tom Stewart, wing Ethan McIlroy, prop Callum Reid flanker David McCann, lock Cormac Izuchukwu, and wing Ben Moxham.

Five new players joined the academy: out-half James Humphreys, son of Ulster great David Humphreys, joining from the Gloucester academy; RBAI centre Jude Postlethwaite; and three players from Sullivan Upper School, lock Harry Sheridan, prop George Saunderson and scrum-half Conor McKee.

Departing were hooker Adam McBurney to Edinburgh, Matt Faddes to Otago, and out-half Bill Johnston to Ealing Trailfinders, making his loan move last season permanent. Fullback Louis Ludik retired. Scrum-half Alby Mathewson and prop Kyle McCall were released, and academy centre Hayden Hyde moved to Harlequins' academy.

=== Summer internationals ===
Lock Iain Henderson was selected for the 2021 British & Irish Lions tour to South Africa. He didn't play in any of the tests, but made four appearances, including starting against Japan and captaining the side against the Sharks.

Centre James Hume, wing Robert Baloucoune and flanker Nick Timoney all made their Ireland debuts in the summer international against the United States in July, and uncapped fullback Michael Lowry trained with the Ireland squad for the summer internationals.

Having been awarded development contracts at the start of the season, scrum-half Nathan Doak and wing Ethan McIlroy signed long-term senior contracts in December - Doak for four years, McIlroy for three.

It was announced that Former head coach Neil Doak would return to Ulster as elite player development officer for the academy in early 2022.

In February, lock David O'Connor joined Ealing Trailfinders until the end of the season, and academy centre Jude Postlethwaite signed a development contract, to be upgraded to a full senior contract after a year. Academy scrum-half Lewis Finlay signed for English Championship club Ampthill.

=== Pre-season friendlies ===
Ulster played two friendlies, home and away, against Saracens. The home match was played at the Kingspan on 3 September 2021, and Saracens won 45–21. The away match at the Honourable Artillery Company grounds in London on 9 September 2021, and Ulster won 33–3.

=== Domestic season: first block ===
Ulster won their first four matches of the URC season. Hooker Bradley Roberts made his first competitive start, and scored a try in the season opener at home to Glasgow Warriors. Scrum-half John Cooney went off injured in the first half, replaced by 19-year-old Nathan Doak, who scored a try and three conversions. With Cooney missing, Doak started in the away win against Zebre Parma and the home wins against Benetton and Lions, and continued to impress. Hooker Rob Herring made his 200th appearance for Ulster against Benetton. Fullback Will Addison sustained a fracture to his lower leg in the October match against the Lions. Ulster's winning run was halted by a defeat away to Connacht at the Aviva Stadium on 23 October.

=== Autumn international break ===
Club competition then took a break for the Autumn internationals. Lock Iain Henderson came on as a replacement for Ireland in the 60–5 win over Japan, and started in the 29–20 victory over New Zealand, with hooker Rob Herring coming off the bench. Henderson and wing Robert Baloucoune started, with prop Tom O'Toole and flanker Nick Timoney coming off the bench, in the 53–7 win against Argentina. Centres James Hume and Stuart McCloskey were named in the 38-man squad, but did not make an appearance. Hooker Bradley Roberts was called up for Wales, and made his international debut from the bench against South Africa.

=== Domestic season: second block ===
After the break, John Cooney returned to action for a 20–10 away win over Leinster, with the back row of Marcus Rea, Nick Timoney and David McCann impressing, but this was followed by a disappointing away loss to Ospreys, in which wing Craig Gilroy made his 200th appearance for Ulster.

Ulster opened their Champions Cup season on 11 December with an away win against Clermont, which marked Duane Vermeulen's debut for the province. The following weekend they defeated Northampton Saints at home, with fullback Michael Lowry scoring two tries. The next two scheduled URC matches, Interpros at home to Connacht on 26 December and Leinster on 1 January, were postponed because of COVID-19 cases. Ulster's next game was a tight away defeat to Munster, before the Champions Cup resumed with an away win against Northampton Saints, which marked Nathan Doak's first European start, and a home win against Clermont, in which Ulster built up a 22-point lead before Clermont almost pulled it back with three late tries. These four pool victories earned Ulster a two-legged round of 16 tie against reigning champions Toulouse.

=== Six Nations international break ===
Robert Baloucoune, James Hume, Michael Lowry, Iain Henderson, Rob Herring, Tom O'Toole and Nick Timoney were called up to the Ireland squad for the 2022 Six Nations Championship on 19 January. Bradley Roberts was called up for Wales.

A depleted Ulster side, missing most of their internationals, defeated Scarlets at home on 28 January. Wing Craig Gilroy, who received a yellow card for a dangerous tackle during the game, was later cited and banned for four matches. The home tie against Connacht was rescheduled for 4 February, on the eve of Ireland's opening match of the Six Nations against Wales. Robert Baloucoune, Michael Lowry and Nick Timoney, who had not been selected for that game, were temporarily released from the Ireland camp back to Ulster. Baloucoune and Lowry started, Timoney came off the bench, and Baloucoune scored two tries, in a 32–12 victory. Hooker Declan Moore, who had joined Ulster as short-term injury cover from Munster, and had just agreed to a permanent move next season, unexpectedly made his debut after a last-minute injury to John Andrew, and scored a try. The following day, James Hume came off the bench in Ireland's 29–7 victory over Wales.

Fullback Michael Lowry made his debut for Ireland against Italy in the Six Nations on 27 February 2022.

James McCormick, Reuben Crothers, James McNabney, Josh Hanlon, Adam McNamee, Scott Wilson, Jude Postlethwaite, Lorcan McLoughlin and Ben Carson appeared for Ireland in the 2022 U20 Six Nations.

=== Domestic season: third block ===
Having beaten Leinster away in November, Ulster completed a rare double by defeating them at home on a rainy night in March. They then travelled to South Africa, losing narrowly to the Stormers in Cape Town after a late try by Callum Reid, which would have put Ulster ahead, was disallowed after TMO review. URC head of officials Tappe Henning later admitted the try should have stood. Alan O'Connor made his 150th appearance for Ulster against the Stormers. The following week, against the Bulls in Pretoria, Andrew Warwick made his 150th appearance as Ulster fell to a 34–16 defeat. The trip to South Africa saw centre Luke Marshall return to action after 16 months out with a knee injury. He came off the bench against the Stormers, and started, and scored, against the Bulls.

Ulster won the away leg of their Champions Cup round of 16 tie against Toulouse 26–20, with Robert Baloucoune scoring a hat-trick after Toulouse wing Juan Cruz Mallia was shown an early red card. Taking a six-point lead into the second leg at home, they lost 30–23, going out of the competition 49–50 on aggregate. Flanker Nick Timoney made his 100th appearance for the province in the second leg.

Former Springboks and Ulster flanker Pedrie Wannenburg was killed in a car accident in Texas in April.

In the wake of the defeat at home to Toulouse, Ulster suffered their first home loss in the URC, at home to Munster. The following week, they ended their losing run by inflicting a first home league defeat on Edinburgh in a close contest, confirming their qualification for the quarter-finals. Two weeks later, they secured a home quarter-final by defeating the Sharks at home. They defeated Munster in the quarter-final at Ravenhill on 3 June, earning a semi-final away to the Stormers. They led late in the semi-final in Cape Town, but the Stormers came back to win with a last-minute converted try.

== Awards ==
=== Ulster Rugby Awards ===
The Ulster Rugby Awards were announced online on 23 June 2022. Winners were:

==== Men's and women's awards ====
- Men's Player of the Year: James Hume (nominees: Robert Baloucoune, Michael Lowry, Nick Timoney, Andrew Warwick)
- Supporters Club Player of the Year: Michael Lowry
- Rugby Writers' Player of the Year: James Hume (nominees: Robert Baloucoune, Michael Lowry, Nick Timoney)
- Young Men's Player of the Year: Ethan McIlroy (nominees: Nathan Doak, Ben Moxham)
- Boys' Youth Player of the Year: Ethan Graham, Monaghan RFC/Belfast Met RFC (nominees: Michael Burnett, City of Armagh RFC; Mark Lee, Rainey Old Boys R.F.C.)
- Boys' Schools Player of the Year: Joe Hopes, Campbell College (nominees: Ben McFarlane, Methodist College Belfast; Josh Stevens, Methodist College Belfast)

==== Women's and girls' awards ====
- Personality of the Year: Ashleigh Orchard
- Women's Player of the Year: Aishling O'Connell, Cooke RFC (nominees: Keelin Brady, Railway Union RFC; Beth Cregan, Cooke RFC; Kelly McCormill, Cooke RFC; Fiona Tuite, Old Belvedere RFC)
- Young Women's Player of the Year: Jorja Battishill, Malone RFC (nominees: Sophie Barrett, Enniskillen RFC; Rachael McIlroy, Queen's University RFC; Fern Wilson, Malone RFC)
- U18 Girls' Player of the Year: Sadhbh McGrath, City of Derry RFC (nominees: Farrah Cartin-McCloskey, Enniskillen RFC; Sarah Shrestha, Loughborough University)
- Girls' Schools Player of the Year: Sophie Barrett, Erne Integrated College (nominees: Moya Hill, Erne Integrated College; Zara Hutchinson, Enniskillen Royal Grammar School)

==== Club & community awards ====
- Club of the Year: Queen's University RFC (nominees: Ballymena RFC, Ballynahinch RFC, Virginia RFC)
- Ken Goodall Club Player of the Year: David Whitten, Queen's University RFC (nominees: Michael Orr, Queen's University RFC; Shea O'Brien, City of Armagh RFC)
- Dorrington B. Faulker (Services to Rugby) Award: Anne Scott, Inishowen RFC president
- Referee of the Year: Chris Busby

=== URC awards ===
Alan O'Connor won the URC Tackle Machine award for the 2021–22 season, after making 195 tackles with a 97.5% success rate in that competition. Flanker Nick Timoney and centre James Hume were named in the URC Dream Team.

=== EPCR awards ===
Michael Lowry was named on the long list for EPCR European Player of the Year for the 2021–22 season,

== Men's personnel ==
=== Staff ===
Position	Name	Nationality
Chief executive officer	Jonny Petrie	Scotland
Operations director	Bryn Cunningham	Ireland
Head coach	Dan McFarland	England
Assistant coach	Dan Soper	New Zealand
Defence coach	Jared Payne	Ireland
Forwards coach	Roddy Grant	Scotland
Skills coach	Craig Newby	New Zealand
Academy manager	Gavin Hogg	Ireland
Elite performance development officer	Willie Faloon	Ireland
Elite performance development officer	Neil Doak	Ireland

=== Senior squad ===
==== Players in ====
- (Ireland) Mick Kearney from (Italy) Zebre Parma (short-term deal)
- (Australia) Declan Moore from (Ireland) Munster (short-term loan)
- (South Africa) Duane Vermeulen from (South Africa) Bulls

==== Promoted from academy ====
- (Ireland) Nathan Doak
- (Ireland) Cormac Izuchukwu
- (Ireland) David McCann
- (Ireland) Ethan McIlroy
- (Ireland) Ben Moxham
- (Ireland) Callum Reid
- (Ireland) Aaron Sexton
- (Ireland) Tom Stewart

==== Players out ====
- (South Africa) Marcell Coetzee to (South Africa) Bulls
- (New Zealand) Matt Faddes to (New Zealand) Otago
- (Ireland) Bill Johnston to (England) Ealing Trailfinders
- (South Africa) Louis Ludik retired
- (New Zealand) Alby Mathewson released
- (Ireland) Adam McBurney to (Scotland) Edinburgh
- (Ireland) Kyle McCall released

Ulster Rugby squad (Note: Taking into account signings and departures head of 2021–22 season as listed on List of 2021–22 United Rugby Championship transfers.) (Note: Appearances and scoring stats from ItsRugby.co.uk as at 1 May 2022)
**Props**: (Ireland) Andrew Warwick (20 apps, 17 starts, 5 pts); (Ireland) **Marty Moore** (16 apps, 13 starts, 10 pts); (Ireland) **Tom O'Toole** (18 apps, 11 starts, 1 (yellow card) ); (Ireland) **Eric O'Sullivan** (20 apps, 7 starts); (South Africa) Gareth Milasinovich* (10 apps, 2 starts, 5 pts); (Ireland) **Jack McGrath** (7 apps, 2 starts); (Ireland) Ross Kane (8 apps); (Ireland) Callum Reid (5 apps); **Hookers**: (Ireland) **Rob Herring** (19 apps, 18 starts, 30 pts); (Ireland) John Andrew (9 apps, 4 starts, 5 pts); (Wales) **Bradley Roberts** (13 apps, 3 starts, 10 pts); (Australia) Declan Moore * (1 app, 1 start, 5 pts)^{ST}; (Ireland) Tom Stewart (5 apps, 5 pts); **Locks**: (Ireland) Alan O'Connor (24 apps, 23 starts, 2 (yellow card) ); (Ireland) **Iain Henderson** (c) (11 apps, 11 starts); (Australia) **Sam Carter** (16 apps, 9 starts, 10 pts); (Ireland) **Kieran Treadwell** (17 apps, 8 starts, 2 (yellow card) ); (Ireland) Mick Kearney (9 apps, 1 start)^{ST}; (Ireland) Cormac Izuchukwu (1 app); (Ireland) David O'Connor (no apps)	**Back row**: (Ireland) **Nick Timoney** (24 apps, 23 starts, 40 pts, 1 (yellow card) ); (Ireland) Marcus Rea (22 apps, 17 starts, 5 pts); (South Africa) **Duane Vermeulen** (17 apps, 16 starts, 5 pts); (Ireland) Matty Rea (13 apps, 7 starts, 5 pts); (Ireland) David McCann (8 apps, 7 starts); (Ireland) Greg Jones (11 apps, 6 starts, 10 pts); (Ireland) **Jordi Murphy** (6 apps, 3 starts); (Ireland) **Sean Reidy** (7 apps, 2 starts, 5 pts); **Scrum-halves**: (Ireland) Nathan Doak (21 apps, 13 starts, 133 pts); (Ireland) **John Cooney** (17 apps, 13 starts, 105 points); (Ireland) David Shanahan (9 apps); **Fly-halves**: (Ireland) **Billy Burns** (24 apps, 24 starts, 2 pts); (Ireland) **Ian Madigan** (8 apps, 1 start)	**Centres**: (Ireland) **James Hume** (21 apps, 21 starts, 30 pts, 2 (yellow card) ); (Ireland) **Stuart McCloskey** (18 apps, 18 starts, 20 pts); (Ireland) Stewart Moore (17 apps, 10 starts, 15 pts); (Ireland) Ben Moxham (14 apps, 6 starts); (Zimbabwe) Angus Curtis* (5 apps, 4 starts, 5 pts); (Ireland) **Luke Marshall** (3 apps, 1 start, 5 pts); **Wings**: (Ireland) Ethan McIlroy (22 apps, 21 starts, 25 pts); (Ireland) **Robert Baloucoune** (17 apps, 17 starts, 55 pts, 1 (yellow card) ); (Ireland) **Craig Gilroy** (12 apps, 10 starts, 15 pts, 1 (yellow card) ); (Ireland) Rob Lyttle (10 apps, 3 starts); (Ireland) **Jacob Stockdale** (1 app, 1 start); (Ireland) Aaron Sexton (2 apps, 5 pts); **Fullbacks**: (Ireland) Michael Lowry (21 apps, 16 starts, 27 pts); (Ireland) **Will Addison** (4 apps, 3 starts, 5 pts)
(c) denotes the team captain, **Bold** denotes internationally capped players.^{*} denotes players qualified to play for Ireland on residency or dual nationality.^{ST} denotes a short-term signing.

=== Academy squad ===
==== Players in ====
- (Ireland) Harry Sheridan from (Ireland) Sullivan Upper School.
- (Ireland) Jude Postlethwaite from (Ireland) RBAI
- (Ireland) Conor McKee from (Ireland) Sullivan Upper School
- (Ireland) James Humphreys from (England) Gloucester academy
- (Ireland) George Saunderson from (Ireland) Sullivan Upper School

==== Players out ====
- (Ireland) Hayden Hyde to (England) Harlequins academy
- (Ireland) Bruce Houston to (Scotland) Heriot's Rugby Club

Ulster Rugby academy squad
**Props**: (Ireland) George Saunderson **(1)**; **Hookers**: (Ireland) James McCormick **(2)**; **Locks**: (Ireland) Harry Sheridan **(1)**	**Back row**: (Ireland) Azur Allison **(3)**; (Ireland) Reuben Crothers **(2)**; **Scrum-halves**: (Ireland) Lewis Finlay **(3)**; (Ireland) Conor McKee **(1)**; **Fly-halves**: (Ireland) James Humphreys **(1)**	**Centres**: (Ireland) Ben Carson **(2)**; (Ireland) Jude Postlethwaite **(1)**; **Wings**: (Ireland) Conor Rankin **(2)**; **Fullbacks**: None currently named
Number in brackets indicates players stage in the three-year academy cycle.^{*} denotes players qualified to play for Ireland on residency or dual nationality. Players and their allocated positions from the Ulster Rugby website.

== Men's competitions and results ==
=== Season record ===
Competition	Played	Won	Drawn	Lost	PF	PA	PD	TF	TA
2021-22 Champions Cup	4	4	0	0	163	146	17	21	14
2021-22 URC	19	13	0	7	463	331	132	59	40
Total	23	17	0	7	626	477	149	80	54

=== Home attendance ===
Domestic League					European Cup					Total	
League	Fixtures	Average Attendance	Highest	Lowest	League	Fixtures	Average Attendance	Highest	Lowest	Total Attendance	Average Attendance
2021–22 United Rugby Championship	10	11,696	16,274	9,542	2021–22 European Rugby Champions Cup	3	14,969	18,196	12,000	161,869	12,452

=== 2021–22 United Rugby Championship ===
2021–22 United Rugby Championship Table
	Team	P	W	D	L	PF	PA	PD	TF	TA	Try bonus	Losing bonus	Pts
1	(Ireland) Leinster	18	13	0	5	546	276	+270	73	31	11	4	67
2	(South Africa) Stormers (CH)	18	12	2	4	464	311	+153	60	36	7	2	61
3	(Ireland) Ulster	18	12	0	6	412	297	+115	52	34	7	4	59
4	(South Africa) Bulls (RU)	18	11	0	7	518	388	+130	67	42	10	4	58
5	(South Africa) Sharks	18	11	1	6	510	365	+145	60	43	9	2	57
6	(Ireland) Munster	18	11	0	7	524	341	+183	66	34	8	4	56
7	(Scotland) Edinburgh	18	10	1	7	421	318	+103	56	37	8	4	54
8	(Scotland) Glasgow Warriors	18	10	0	8	409	376	+33	53	44	7	3	50
9	(Wales) Ospreys	18	10	0	8	422	474	–52	46	62	4	2	46
10	(Wales) Scarlets	18	8	0	10	494	534	–40	65	73	10	3	45
11	(Ireland) Connacht	18	9	0	9	399	502	–103	51	67	4	1	41
12	(South Africa) Lions	18	8	0	10	408	450	–42	48	55	7	2	41
13	(Italy) Benetton	18	6	1	11	425	501	–76	53	67	6	3	35
14	(Wales) Cardiff	18	7	0	11	369	577	–208	41	72	3	1	32
15	(Wales) Dragons	18	2	1	15	305	547	–242	36	71	3	6	19
16	(Italy) Zebre Parma	18	1	0	17	261	630	–369	32	90	2	3	9
If teams are level at any stage, tiebreakers are applied in the following order: 1. number of matches won; 2. number of matches drawn; 3. the difference between points for and points against; 4. the number of tries scored; 5. the most points scored; 6. the difference between tries for and tries against; 7. the fewest red cards received; 8. the fewest yellow cards received.
Green background indicates teams that are playoff places that top their regional pools and earn a place in the 2022–23 European Champions Cup Blue background indicates teams that did not top their regional pool but are in play-off places and earn a place in the 2022–23 European Champions Cup; Pink background indicates teams that did not top their regional pool or earn a place in the 2022–23 European Champions Cup, but are in play-off places. Yellow background indicates teams that top their regional pool and earn a place in the 2022–23 European Champions Cup, but are not in a play-off place Plain background indicates teams that earn a place in the 2022–23 European Challenge Cup. (q) : qualified for the play-offs; (S) : winner of the Regional Shield and qualified for the 2022–23 European Rugby Champions Cup; (e) : qualified for the 2022–23 European Challenge Cup

24 September 2021	(1 BP) Ulster (Ireland)	35–29	(Scotland) Glasgow Warriors (2 BP)	Ravenhill Stadium, Belfast
19:35	Try: Roberts 23' c M. Moore 44' c Timoney 49' c Doak 60' c Con: Cooney 24'; Doak (3) 45', 50', 61'; Cards: Hume (yellow card) 54'	Report; Match Centre; Highlights	Try: Horne 15' m Matthews 40' +3 c Penalty try 55'; Dobie 65' c Con: Thompson (2) 40' +4, 66'; Pen: Weir 27'; Cards: Forbes (yellow card) 3'	Attendance: 10,000; Referee: Ben Whitehouse
Ulster lineup: 1. Andrew Warwick, 2. Bradley Roberts, 3. Marty Moore, 4. Alan O'Connor, 5. Sam Carter, 6. Greg Jones, 7. Sean Reidy, 8. Nick Timoney, 9. John Cooney, 10. Billy Burns, 11. Jacob Stockdale, 12. Stuart McCloskey, 13. James Hume, 14. Robert Baloucoune, 15. Ethan McIlroy.; Replacements: 16. Rob Herring (for Roberts, 40), 17. Eric O'Sullivan (for Warwick, 40), 18. Tom O'Toole (for M. Moore, 49), 19. Mick Kearney (for Carter, 40), 20. Matty Rea (for Jones, 68), 21. Nathan Doak (for Cooney, 30), 22. Michael Lowry (for Burns, 76), 23. Will Addison (for Baloucoune, 57).				Attendance: 10,000; Referee: Ben Whitehouse

2 October 2021	Zebre Parma (Italy)	3–36	(Ireland) Ulster (1 BP)	Stadio Sergio Lanfranchi, Parma
17:15	Pen: Rizzi 34'; Cards: Neculai (yellow card) 52'; Mbanda (yellow card) 61'	Report; Match Centre; Highlights; Player of the Match: Nathan Doak	Try: McIlroy (2) 21' m, 40' m Addison 47' c Hume 57' m Timoney (2) 63' c, 79' c Con: Burns 48'; Doak 64'; Lowry 80'	Attendance: 1,400; Referee: Sam Grove-White
Ulster lineup: 1. Eric O'Sullivan, 2. Rob Herring, 3. Tom O'Toole, 4. Alan O'Connor, 5. Mick Kearney, 6. Matty Rea, 7. Nick Timoney, 8. David McCann, 9. Nathan Doak, 10. Billy Burns, 11. Ethan McIlroy, 12. Stewart Moore, 13. James Hume, 14. Craig Gilroy, 15. Will Addison.; Replacements: 16. Bradley Roberts (for Herring, 58), 17. Callum Reid (for O'Sullivan, 60), 18. Marty Moore (for O'Toole, 40), 19. Sam Carter (for Kearney, 40), 20. Sean Reidy (for McCann, 58), 21. David Shanahan (for Doak, 65), 22. Michael Lowry (for Burns, 58), 23. Ben Moxham (for Addison, 63).				Attendance: 1,400; Referee: Sam Grove-White

8 October 2021	(1 BP) Ulster (Ireland)	28–8	(Italy) Benetton	Ravenhill Stadium, Belfast
19:35	Try: Gilroy 23' c Doak (2) 27' c, 78' c Herring 34' c Con: Doak (4) 24', 28', 35', 79'; Cards: Hume (yellow card) 57'	Report; Match Centre; Highlights; Player of the Match: Nathan Doak	Try: Ratuva Tavuyara 59' m Pen: Marin 8'; Cards: Nemer (yellow card) 17'	Attendance: 10,582; Referee: AJ Jacobs
Ulster lineup: 1. Andrew Warwick, 2. Rob Herring, 3. Tom O'Toole, 4. Alan O'Connor, 5. Sam Carter, 6. Matty Rea, 7. Nick Timoney, 8. David McCann, 9. Nathan Doak, 10. Billy Burns, 11. Ethan McIlroy, 12. Stewart Moore, 13. James Hume, 14. Craig Gilroy, 15. Will Addison.; Replacements: 16. Bradley Roberts (for Herring, 69), 17. Callum Reid (for Warwick, 1), 18. Ross Kane (for O'Toole, 54), 19. Mick Kearney (for Carter, 50), 20. Sean Reidy (for McCann, 64), 21. David Shanahan (for Doak, 79), 22. Michael Lowry (for Burns, 40), 23. Ben Moxham.				Attendance: 10,582; Referee: AJ Jacobs

15 October 2021	(1 BP) Ulster (Ireland)	26–10	(South Africa) Lions	Ravenhill Stadium, Belfast
19:35	Try: Timoney (2) 4' m, 67' c Hume 35' c Rea 48' c Con: Doak (3) 36', 49', 68'	Report; Match Centre; Highlights; Player of the Match: Nick Timoney	Try: Pienaar 17' c Con: Viljoen 18'; Pen: Viljoen 40'	Attendance: 11,412; Referee: Mike Adamson
Ulster lineup: 1. Andrew Warwick, 2. Rob Herring, 3. Tom O'Toole, 4. Alan O'Connor, 5. Sam Carter, 6. Matty Rea, 7. Nick Timoney, 8. David McCann, 9. Nathan Doak, 10. Billy Burns, 11. Ethan McIlroy, 12. Stewart Moore, 13. James Hume, 14. Craig Gilroy, 15. Will Addison.; Replacements: 16. Bradley Roberts (for Herring, 58), 17. Eric O'Sullivan (for Warwick, 52), 18. Ross Kane (for O'Toole, 67), 19. Kieran Treadwell (for Carter, 44), 20. Sean Reidy (for McCann, 58), 21. David Shanahan (for Doak, 74), 22. Michael Lowry (for Addison, 45), 23. Ben Moxham (for S. Moore, 74).				Attendance: 11,412; Referee: Mike Adamson

23 October 2021	(1 BP) Connacht (Ireland)	36–11	(Ireland) Ulster	Aviva Stadium, Dublin
17:15	Try: Murray 11' c Hansen (2) 25' c, 80+2' c Porch 62' m Kilgallen 65' c Con: Carty (4) 13', 25', 66', 80' +3; Pen: Carty 28'; Cards: Dillane (yellow card) 36'	Report; Match Centre; Highlights	Try: Roberts 68' m Pen: Doak (2) 5', 17'; Cards: A. O'Connor (yellow card) 32'	Attendance: 9,875; Referee: Andrew Brace
Ulster lineup: 1. Eric O'Sullivan, 2. Rob Herring, 3. Tom O'Toole, 4. Alan O'Connor, 5. Iain Henderson, 6. Matty Rea, 7. Nick Timoney, 8. David McCann, 9. Nathan Doak, 10. Billy Burns, 11. Craig Gilroy, 12. Stuart McCloskey, 13. James Hume, 14. Robert Baloucoune, 15. Ethan McIlroy.; Replacements: 16. Bradley Roberts (for Herring, 51), 17. Andrew Warwick (for O'Sullivan, 51), 18. Ross Kane (for O'Toole, 51), 19. Kieran Treadwell (for Henderson, 54), 20. Greg Jones (for McCann, 54), 21. David Shanahan (for Doak, 65), 22. Michael Lowry (for Gilroy, 23), 23. Ben Moxham (for McIlroy, 66).				Attendance: 9,875; Referee: Andrew Brace

27 November 2021	Leinster (Ireland)	10–20	(Ireland) Ulster	RDS Arena, Dublin
20:00	Try: Henshaw 51' c Con: Byrne 51'; Pen: Byrne 65'	Report; Match Centre; Highlights; Player of the Match: James Hume	Try: Jones 16' c Hume 79' c Con: Cooney 17'; Doak 80'; Pen: Cooney 48'; Doak 68'	Attendance: 14,625; Referee: Frank Murphy
Ulster lineup: 1. Andrew Warwick, 2. Rob Herring, 3. Marty Moore, 4. Alan O'Connor, 5. Sam Carter, 6. Greg Jones, 7. Nick Timoney, 8. David McCann, 9. John Cooney, 10. Billy Burns, 11. Ethan McIlroy, 12. Stuart McCloskey, 13. James Hume, 14. Craig Gilroy, 15. Michael Lowry.; Replacements: 16. Tom Stewart, 17. Eric O'Sullivan (for Warwick, 45), 18. Ross Kane (for Moore, 70), 19. Mick Kearney (for Carter, 46), 20. Marcus Rea (for Jones, 20), 21. Nathan Doak (for Cooney, 59), 22. Angus Curtis, 23. Rob Lyttle (for Lowry, 51).				Attendance: 14,625; Referee: Frank Murphy

4 December 2021	Ospreys (Wales)	19–13	(Ireland) Ulster (1 BP)	Liberty Stadium, Swansea
15:00	Try: Morris 32' c Con: Myler 34'; Pen: Myler (4) 18', 36', 60', 66'; Cards: Morgan (yellow card) 14'	Report; Match Centre; Highlights	Try: Penalty try 15'; Pen: Cooney (2) 20', 53'	Attendance: 5,695; Referee: Sam Grove-White
Ulster lineup: 1. Eric O'Sullivan, 2. Bradley Roberts, 3. Tom O'Toole, 4. Kieran Treadwell, 5. Alan O'Connor, 6. Sean Reidy, 7. Nick Timoney, 8. David McCann, 9. John Cooney, 10. Billy Burns, 11. Ethan McIlroy, 12. Stuart McCloskey, 13. Angus Curtis, 14. Robert Baloucoune, 15. Michael Lowry.; Replacements: 16. Tom Stewart (for Roberts, 32-68), 17. Jack McGrath (for O'Sullivan, 46), 18. Marty Moore (for O'Toole, 48-63), 19. Mick Kearney (for O'Connor, 52), 20. Marcus Rea (for McCann, 63), 21. Nathan Doak (for Cooney, 56), 22. Stewart Moore (for Curtis, 56), 23. Craig Gilroy (for Baloucoune, 77), O'Sullivan (for Stewart, 68).				Attendance: 5,695; Referee: Sam Grove-White

8 January 2022	Munster (Ireland)	18–13	(Ireland) Ulster (1 BP)	Thomond Park, Limerick
19:35	Try: Haley 61' m Kendellen 76' c Con: Healy 77'; Pen: Crowley (2) 33', 40+1'; Cards: Zebo (red card) 14'	Report; Match Centre; Highlights	Try: Herring 8' c Con: Cooney 10'; Pen: Doak (2) 43', 57'; Cards: Treadwell (yellow card) 58'	Attendance: 5,000; Referee: Mike Adamson
Ulster lineup: 1. Jack McGrath, 2. Rob Herring, 3. Tom O'Toole, 4. Alan O'Connor, 5. Sam Carter, 6. Greg Jones, 7. Nick Timoney, 8. Duane Vermeulen, 9. John Cooney, 10. Billy Burns, 11. Ethan McIlroy, 12. James Hume, 13. Ben Moxham, 14. Craig Gilroy, 15. Michael Lowry.; Replacements: 16. John Andrew (for Herring, 76), 17. Andrew Warwick (for McGrath, 45), 18. Ross Kane (for O'Toole, 76), 19. Kieran Treadwell (for Carter, 45), 20. Marcus Rea (for Jones, 61), 21. Nathan Doak (for Cooney, 23), 22. Angus Curtis (for Hume, 62), 23. Rob Lyttle (for Gilroy, 76).				Attendance: 5,000; Referee: Mike Adamson

28 January 2022	(1 BP) Ulster (Ireland)	27–15	(Wales) Scarlets	Ravenhill Stadium, Belfast
19:35	Try: Curtis 35' c Carter 53' m Milasinovich 66' c Gilroy 68' m Con: Doak (2) 36', 67'; Pen: Doak 4'; Cards: Gilroy (yellow card) 27'	Report; Match Centre; Highlights; Player of the Match: Billy Burns	Try: Lee 29' c Mathias 62' m Con: Jones 30'; Pen: Jones 10'	Attendance: 9,542; Referee: Jaco Peyper
Ulster lineup: 1. Eric O'Sullivan, 2. John Andrew, 3. Marty Moore, 4. Alan O'Connor, 5. Sam Carter, 6. Greg Jones, 7. Marcus Rea, 8. Duane Vermeulen, 9. Nathan Doak, 10. Billy Burns, 11. Rob Lyttle, 12. Angus Curtis, 13. Ben Moxham, 14. Craig Gilroy, 15. Ethan McIlroy.; Replacements: 16. Bradley Roberts (for Andrew, 49), 17. Jack McGrath (for O'Sullivan), 18. Gareth Milasinovich (for M. Moore, 7-20, 54), 19. Mick Kearney (for Carter, 54), 20. David McCann (for Jones, 54), 21. David Shanahan (for Doak, 70), 22. Ian Madigan (for Burns, 69), 23. Aaron Sexton (for McIlroy, 76).				Attendance: 9,542; Referee: Jaco Peyper

4 February 2022	Ulster (Ireland)	32-12	(Ireland) Connacht	Ravenhill Stadium, Belfast
20:15	Try: Jones 13' c D. Moore 20' c Baloucoune (2) 41' c 83'; Con: Doak (3/3) 15' 21' 42'; Pen: Doak (2/2) 53' 74'	Report; Match Centre; Highlights; Extended highlights Player of the Match: Nathan Doak	Try: McNulty 24'; Alex Wootton 46' c Con: Fitzgerald (1/2) 47'; Cards: Sullivan (yellow card) 2'; Prendergast (yellow card) 80+2'	Attendance: 12,470; Referee: Andy Brace
Ulster lineup: 1. Andrew Warwick, 2. Declan Moore, 3. Gareth Milasinovich, 4. Alan O'Connor, 5. Sam Carter, 6. Greg Jones, 7. Marcus Rea, 8. Duane Vermeulen, 9. Nathan Doak, 10. Billy Burns, 11. Ethan McIlroy, 12. Stuart McCloskey, 13. Angus Curtis, 14. Robert Baloucoune, 15. Michael Lowry.; Replacements: 16. Eric O'Sullivan, 17. Callum Reid (for Warwick, 65), 18. Ross Kane (for Milasinovich, 57), 19. Mick Kearney For Carter, 73), 20. Nick Timoney (for Jones, 48), 21. David Shanahan (for Doak, 77), 22. Ben Moxham (for McCloskey, 77), 23. Rob Lyttle (for McIlroy, 53).				Attendance: 12,470; Referee: Andy Brace

20 February 2022	Dragons (Wales)	0–12	(Ireland) Ulster	Rodney Parade, Newport
14:00	Cards: Doge (yellow card) 74'	Report; Match Centre; Highlights; Player of the Match: Nathan Doak	Try: Mar. Rea 40' m Andrew 47' c Con: Doak 48'	Attendance: 3,892; Referee: Andrea Piardi
'Ulster lineup: 1. Andrew Warwick, 2. John Andrew, 3. Tom O'Toole, 4. Kieran Treadwell, 5. Sam Carter, 6. David McCann, 7. Marcus Rea, 8. Nick Timoney, 9. Nathan Doak, 10. Billy Burns, 11. Ben Moxham, 12. Stuart McCloskey, 13. James Hume, 14. Robert Baloucoune, 15. Rob Lyttle.; Replacements: 16. Bradley Roberts (for Andrew, 50), 17. Eric O'Sullivan (for Warwick, 50), 18. Marty Moore (for O'Toole, 47), 19. Cormac Izuchukwu (for Carter, 62), 20. Matty Rea (for McCann, 62), 21. David Shanahan, 22. Ian Madigan (for Burns, 70), 23. Stewart Moore (for McCloskey, 73).				Attendance: 3,892; Referee: Andrea Piardi

4 March 2022	Ulster (Ireland)	48-12	(Wales) Cardiff	Ravenhill Stadium
19:35	Try: Baloucoune (2) 7' c 15' c Hume 15' c McCloskey 40'; Timoney 48' c Sexton 62'; Stewart 68' c' Con: Doak (3) 8' 15' 49'; Cooney (2) 55' 70'; Pen: Doak 12'	Report; Match Centre; Highlights; Player of the Match: Stewart Moore	Try: Myhill 44'; Ratti 75' c Con: Thomas 76'; Cards: Halaholo (yellow card) 11'	Attendance: 11,559; Referee: Hollie Davidson
Ulster lineup: 1. Jack McGrath, 2. John Andrew, 3. Marty Moore, 4. Alan O'Connor, 5. Iain Henderson, 6. Jordi Murphy, 7. Marcus Rea, 8. Nick Timoney, 9. Nathan Doak, 10. Billy Burns, 11. Ben Moxham, 12. Stuart McCloskey, 13. James Hume, 14. Robert Baloucoune, 15. Stewart Moore.; Replacements: 16. Tom Stewart (for Andrew, 56), 17. Callum Reid (for McGrath, 40), 18. Gareth Milasinovich (for M. Moore, 58), 19. Sam Carter (for O'Connor, 57), 20. Duane Vermeulen (for Murphy, 53), 21. John Cooney (for Doak, 49), 22. Ian Madigan (for McCloskey, 63), 23. Aaron Sexton (for Baloucoune, 57').				Attendance: 11,559; Referee: Hollie Davidson

12 March 2022	Ulster (Ireland)	18-13	(Ireland) Leinster	Ravenhill Stadium, Belfast
19:35	Try: Carter 8' c Lowry 34'; Con: Doak 9'; Pen: Doak (2) 31' 41'	Report; Match Centre; Highlights; Player of the Match: Michael Lowry	Try: Deegan 28' c Con: R. Byrne 28'; Pen: R. Byrne (2) 12' 41'	Attendance: 16,274; Referee: Frank Murphy
Ulster lineup: 1. Andrew Warwick, 2. John Andrew, 3. Marty Moore, 4. Alan O'Connor (c), 5. Sam Carter, 6. Marcus Rea, 7. Nick Timoney, 8. Duane Vermeulen, 9. Nathan Doak, 10. Billy Burns, 11. Craig Gilroy, 12. Stuart McCloskey, 13. Stewart Moore, 14. Robert Baloucoune, 15. Michael Lowry.; Replacements: 16. Tom Stewart (for Andrew, 37), 17. Eric O'Sullivan (for Warwick, 46), 18. Gareth Milasinovich (for M. Moore, 79), 19. Mick Kearney (for Carter, 46), 20. Jordi Murphy (for Marcus Rea, 54), 21. John Cooney (for Doak, 46), 22. Ian Madigan, 23. Ben Moxham (for Vermeulen, 66).				Attendance: 16,274; Referee: Frank Murphy

26 March 2022	Stormers (South Africa)	23–20	(Ireland) Ulster (1 BP)	Cape Town Stadium
13:00	Try: De Wet 3' c Zas 7' c Con: Libbok (2) 4', 8'; Pen: Libbok (3) 28', 40+1', 55'	Report; Match Centre; Highlights	Try: S. Moore 22' c McCloskey 57' c Con: Cooney (2) 23', 58'; Pen: Cooney (2) 33', 39'	Attendance: 3,544; Referee: Gianluca Gnecchi
Ulster lineup: 1. Eric O'Sullivan, 2. Rob Herring, 3. Marty Moore, 4. Alan O'Connor (c), 5. Kieran Treadwell, 6. Greg Jones, 7. Marcus Rea, 8. Duane Vermeulen, 9. John Cooney, 10. Billy Burns, 11. Rob Lyttle, 12. Stuart McCloskey, 13. Stewart Moore, 14. Craig Gilroy, 15. Michael Lowry.; Replacements: 16. Tom Stewart (for Herring, 69), 17. Callum Reid (for O'Sullivan, 55), 18. Gareth Milasinovich (for M. Moore, 56), 19. Mick Kearney (for Treadwell, 76), 20. Jordi Murphy (for Jones, 19), 21. David Shanahan (for Cooney, 75), 22. Luke Marshall (for S. Moore, 64), 23. Ethan McIlroy (for Gilroy, 52).				Attendance: 3,544; Referee: Gianluca Gnecchi

2 April 2022	(1 BP) Bulls (South Africa)	34–16	(Ireland) Ulster	Loftus Versfeld Stadium, Pretoria
13:00	Try: Coetzee 44' c Tambwe 57' c Grobbelaar 66' c Arendse 76' c Con: Smith (2) 44', 57'; Steyn (2) 67', 77'; Pen: Smith (2) 25', 53'; Cards: Coetzee (yellow card) 73'	Report; Match Centre	Try: Marshall 65' c Con: Doak 65'; Pen: Doak (3) 11', 32', 37'; Cards: Treadwell (yellow card) 65'	Attendance: 19,436; Referee: Andrea Piardi
Ulster lineup: 1. Andrew Warwick, 2. Bradley Roberts, 3. Marty Moore, 4. Kieran Treadwell, 5. Iain Henderson (c), 6. Jordi Murphy, 7. Nick Timoney, 8. Duane Vermeulen, 9. Nathan Doak, 10. Ian Madigan, 11. Ethan McIlroy, 12. Luke Marshall, 13. James Hume, 14. Ben Moxham, 15. Michael Lowry.; Replacements: 16. Tom Stewart (for Roberts, 49), 17. Eric O'Sullivan (for Warwick, 49), 18. Tom O'Toole (for Moore, 49), 19. Mick Kearney, 20. Matty Rea (for Vermeulen, 50), 21. John Cooney (for Madigan, 64), 22. Marcus Rea (for Murphy, 61), 23. Stewart Moore (for McIlroy, 2).				Attendance: 19,436; Referee: Andrea Piardi

22 April 2022	(1 BP) Ulster (Ireland)	17–24	(Ireland) Munster	Ravenhill Stadium, Belfast
19:35	Try: Herring 48' c Reidy 75' c Con: Cooney 49'; Doak 76'; Pen: Cooney 8'	Report; Match Centre; Video	Try: Archer 22' c Earls 28' m Con: Carbery 23'; Pen: Carbery (4) 12', 44', 60', 80'; Cards: Daly (yellow card) 73'	Attendance: 12,131; Referee: Jaco Peyper
Ulster lineup: 1. Andrew Warwick, 2. Rob Herring, 3. Marty Moore, 4. Alan O'Connor, 5. Iain Henderson (c), 6. Matty Rea, 7. Jordi Murphy, 8. Nick Timoney, 9. John Cooney, 10. Michael Lowry, 11. Ethan McIlroy, 12. Stuart McCloskey, 13. James Hume, 14. Robert Baloucoune, 15. Stewart Moore.; Replacements: 16. Bradley Roberts (for Herring, 57), 17. Eric O'Sullivan (for Warwick, 64), 18. Gareth Milasinovich (for M. Moore, 23), 19. Sam Carter (for Henderson, 40), 20. Sean Reidy (for Matty Rea, 59), 21. Nathan Doak (for Cooney, 52), 22. Ian Madigan (for S. Moore, 70), 23. Ben Moxham.				Attendance: 12,131; Referee: Jaco Peyper

30 April 2022	Edinburgh (Scotland)	10-16	(Ireland) Ulster	Edinburgh Rugby Stadium
19:35	Try: Bennett 67'; Con: Boffelli 68'; Pen: Boffelli 41'	Report; Match Centre; Player of the Match: James Hume	Try: Baloucoune 13'; Con: Doak 14'; Pen: Doak (3) 19', 33', 48'; Cards: Timoney (yellow card) 5'; A. O'Connor (yellow card) 53'	Attendance: 7,774; Referee: Ben Whitehouse
Ulster lineup: 1. Andrew Warwick, 2. Rob Herring, 3. Gareth Milasinovich, 4. Kieran Treadwell, 5. Iain Henderson (c), 6. Marcus Rea, 7. Nick Timoney, 8. Duane Vermeulen, 9. Nathan Doak, 10. Billy Burns, 11. Ethan McIlroy, 12. Stuart McCloskey, 13. James Hume, 14. Robert Baloucoune, 15. Michael Lowry.; Replacements: 16. Bradley Roberts (for Herring, 67), 17. Eric O'Sullivan (for Warwick, 49), 18. Ross Kane (for Milasinovich, 60), 19. Alan O'Connor (for Henderson, 5), 20. Matty Rea (for Marcus Rea 77), 21. John Cooney (for Doak, 49), 22. Stewart Moore (for McCloskey, 7), 23. Rob Lyttle (for Lowry, 58-70 HIA).				Attendance: 7,774; Referee: Ben Whitehouse

20 May 2022	Ulster (Ireland)	24-21	(South Africa) Sharks	Ravenhill Stadium, Belfast
19:35	Try: Lowry 26'; McCloskey 44'; Hume 64'; Con: Cooney (3) 27', 44', 65'; Pen: Cooney 16'	Report; Match Centre; Player of the Match: Nick Timoney	Try: N. Mchunu 61'; Louw 76'; Williams 79'; Con: Bosch 62'; Chamberlain 76'; Williams 79'	Attendance: 12,739; Referee: Ben Blain
Ulster lineup: 1. Andrew Warwick, 2. Rob Herring, 3. Tom O'Toole, 4. Alan O'Connor, 5. Iain Henderson (c), 6. Marcus Rea, 7. Nick Timoney, 8. Duane Vermeulen, 9. John Cooney, 10. Billy Burns, 11. Ethan McIlroy, 12. Stuart McCloskey, 13. James Hume, 14. Robert Baloucoune, 15. Michael Lowry.; Replacements: 16. John Andrew (for Herring, 75), 17. Eric O'Sullivan (for Warwick, 55), 18. Gareth Milasinovich (for O'Toole, 55'), 19. Kieran Treadwell (for O'Connor, 55'), 20. Matty Rea (for Vermeulen, 65), 21. Nathan Doak (for Cooney, 78), 22. Stewart Moore (for Hume HIA 30-40), 23. Rob Lyttle (for Lowry, 31).				Attendance: 12,739; Referee: Ben Blain

=== Quarter-final ===
3 June 2022	Ulster (Ireland)	36 – 17	(Ireland) Munster	Ravenhill Stadium, Belfast
19:35	Try: Cooney 10'; S. Moore (2) 24', 32'; Timoney 42'; Hume 61'; Con: Cooney (3) 10', 25', 43'; Doak 61'; Pen: Cooney 56'	Report; Match Centre; Player of the Match: James Hume	Try: Kleyn 18'; Earls (2) 52, 69'; Con: Carbery 18'	Attendance: 10,252; Referee: Jaco Peyper
Ulster lineup: 1. Andrew Warwick, 2. Rob Herring, 3. Tom O'Toole, 4. Alan O'Connor, 5. Iain Henderson (c), 6. Marcus Rea, 7. Nick Timoney, 8. Duane Vermeulen, 9. John Cooney, 10. Billy Burns, 11. Ethan McIlroy, 12. Stuart McCloskey, 13. James Hume, 14. Robert Baloucoune, 15. Stewart Moore.; Replacements: 16. John Andrew (for Herring 63), 17. Eric O'Sullivan (for Warwick 19), 18. Gareth Milasinovich (for O'Toole 74), 19. Kieran Treadwell (for O'Connor 65), 20. Matty Rea (for Vermeulen 71), 21. Nathan Doak (for Cooney 57), 22. Ian Madigan (for Burns 67), 23. Ben Moxham (for McIlroy 79).				Attendance: 10,252; Referee: Jaco Peyper

=== Semi-final ===
11 June 2022	Stormers (South Africa)	17–15	(Ireland) Ulster	Cape Town Stadium
15:00	Try: Kotze 5' m Roos 14' m Gelant 80+5' c Con: Libbok 80+7'; Cards: Smith (red card) 70'	Report; Match Centre	Try: Baloucoune 18' m S. Moore 28' c Con: Cooney 29'; Pen: Cooney 40+1'	Attendance: 31,300; Referee: Mike Adamson
Ulster lineup: 1. Andrew Warwick, 2. Rob Herring, 3. Tom O'Toole, 4. Alan O'Connor, 5. Iain Henderson (c), 6. Marcus Rea, 7. Nick Timoney, 8. Duane Vermeulen, 9. John Cooney, 10. Billy Burns, 11. Ethan McIlroy, 12. Stuart McCloskey, 13. James Hume, 14. Robert Baloucoune, 15. Stewart Moore.; Replacements: 16. John Andrew, 17. Eric O'Sullivan (for Warwick 70), 18. Gareth Milasinovich (for O'Toole 83), 19. Kieran Treadwell (for O'Connor 68), 20. Matty Rea (for Marcus Rea 73), 21. Nathan Doak, 22. Ian Madigan (for Burns 81), 23. Ben Moxham (for Baloucoune 46).				Attendance: 31,300; Referee: Mike Adamson

=== 2021–22 European Rugby Champions Cup ===
==== Pool stage ====
Pool A Standings
Team	P	W	D	L	PF	PA	Diff	TF	TA	TB	LB	Pts
(France) Racing 92	4	4	0	0	126	24	+102	16	3	3	0	19
(Ireland) Ulster	4	4	0	0	114	96	+18	15	9	3	0	19
(France) La Rochelle	4	3	1	0	97	64	+33	11	7	2	0	16
(Ireland) Leinster	4	3	0	1	198	62	+136	30	8	3	0	15
(England) Sale Sharks	4	2	1	1	89	48	+41	13	5	1	1	12
(England) Exeter Chiefs	4	2	0	2	127	82	+45	19	7	3	0	11
(France) Montpellier	4	2	0	2	78	157	–79	9	23	2	0	10
(France) Clermont	4	1	1	2	79	82	–3	8	10	0	2	8
(Scotland) Glasgow Warriors	4	1	0	3	82	117	–35	7	15	0	1	5
(England) Northampton Saints	4	0	0	4	56	124	–68	6	17	0	2	2
(England) Bath	4	0	1	3	48	148	–100	6	22	0	0	2
(Wales) Ospreys	4	0	0	4	33	123	–90	3	17	0	0	0

11 December 2021	(1 BP) Clermont (France)	23–29	(Ireland) Ulster	Stade Marcel-Michelin, Clermont-Ferrand
18:30	Try: Penaud (2) 35' c, 57' c Con: Hanrahan (2/2) 35', 59'; Pen: Hanrahan (3/4) 40'+1, 63', 80'+1; Cards: Van Tonder (yellow card) 36'; Tiberghien (yellow card) 68'	Report; Match centre Highlights; Star of the Match: John Cooney	Try: McCloskey 26' c Timoney 68' c Con: Cooney (2/2) 28', 69'; Pen: Cooney (5/5) 2', 7', 14', 38', 74'	Attendance: 14,443; Referee: Wayne Barnes (England)
Ulster lineup: 1. Andrew Warwick, 2. Rob Herring, 3. Tom O'Toole, 4. Alan O'Connor, 5. Kieran Treadwell, 6. Marcus Rea, 7. Nick Timoney, 8. Duane Vermeulen, 9. John Cooney, 10. Billy Burns, 11. Ethan McIlroy, 12. Stuart McCloskey, 13. James Hume, 14. Robert Baloucoune, 15. Michael Lowry.; Replacements: 16. John Andrew, 17. Jack McGrath (for Warwick, 52), 18. Ross Kane (for O'Toole, 68), 19. Sam Carter (for Marcus Rea, 62'), 20. Greg Jones (for Vermeulen, 50'), 21. Nathan Doak (for Lowry, 75), 22. Stewart Moore (for Baloucoune, 36') 23. Sean Reidy (for Treadwell, 62').				Attendance: 14,443; Referee: Wayne Barnes (England)

17 December 2021	(1 BP) Ulster (Ireland)	27–22	(England) Northampton Saints (1 BP)	Ravenhill Stadium, Belfast
20:00	Try: Herring 2' c Penalty try 16'; McIlroy 20' m Gilroy 58' m Con: Cooney (1/3) 3'; Pen: Cooney (1/1) 46'	Report; Match Centre; Highlights; Star of the Match: Nick Timoney	Try: Mitchell 61' m Skosan 79' m Pen: Furbank (4/4) 7', 19', 23', 30'; Cards: Mitchell (yellow card) 15'	Attendance: 14,712; Referee: Andrea Piardi (Italy)
Ulster lineup: 1. Andrew Warwick, 2. Rob Herring, 3. Marty Moore, 4. Alan O'Connor, 5. Iain Henderson, 6. Marcus Rea, 7. Nick Timoney, 8. Duane Vermeulen, 9. John Cooney, 10. Billy Burns, 11. Ethan McIlroy, 12. Stuart McCloskey, 13. James Hume, 14. Craig Gilroy, 15. Michael Lowry.; Replacements: 16. John Andrew (for Herring, 55), 17. Jack McGrath (for Warwick, 61), 18. Tom O'Toole (for M. Moore, 55), 19. Kieran Treadwell (for Henderson, 47'), 20. Sam Carter (for A. O'Connor, 65), 21. Nathan Doak, 22. Stewart Moore (for McCloskey, 18) 23. Greg Jones (for Marcus Rea, 72).				Attendance: 14,712; Referee: Andrea Piardi (Italy)

16 January 2022	(1 BP) Northampton Saints (England)	20–24	(Ireland) Ulster (1 BP)	Franklin's Gardens, Northampton
15:15	Try: Biggar 36' c Hutchinson 79' c Con: Biggar (1/1) 37'; Furbank (1/1) 79'; Pen: Biggar (2/2) 19', 43'; Cards: Mitchell (yellow card) 55'	Report; Centre; Highlights; Star of the Match: Michael Lowry	Try: Baloucoune 6' m Doak 13' c Lowry (2) 14', 40'; Con: Doak (2/3) 14', 40'	Attendance: 13,271; Referee: Pierre Brousset (France)
Ulster lineup: 1. Andrew Warwick, 2. Rob Herring, 3. Marty Moore, 4. Alan O'Connor, 5. Kieran Treadwell, 6. Marcus Rea, 7. Nick Timoney, 8. Duane Vermeulen, 9. Nathan Doak, 10. Billy Burns, 11. Ethan McIlroy, 12. Stewart Moore, 13. James Hume, 14. Robert Baloucoune, 15. Michael Lowry.; Replacements: 16. John Andrew, 17. Eric O'Sullivan (for Warwick, 14), 18. Tom O'Toole (for M. Moore, 57), 19. Sam Carter (for A. O'Connor, 57), 20. Greg Jones (for Marcus Rea, 67), 21. David Shanahan (for Doak, 58), 22. Ian Madigan (for Burns, 55), 23. Ben Moxham.				Attendance: 13,271; Referee: Pierre Brousset (France)

22 January 2022	(1 BP) Ulster (Ireland)	34–31	(France) Clermont (1 BP)	Ravenhill Stadium, Belfast
17:30	Try: Herring (2) 7' m, 38' c Lowry 22' m Vermeulen 49' c Baloucoune 65' c Con: Doak (2/4) 40', 50'; Burns (1/1) 67'; Pen: Doak (1/1) 45'	Report; Match Centre; Highlights; Star of the Match: James Hume	Try: Van Tonder 69' m Raka 72' c Cancoriet 75' c Con: Lopez (2/3) 73', 76'; Pen: Parra (4/4) 12', 18', 25', 35'; Cards: Raka (yellow card) 38'	Attendance: 12,000; Referee: Luke Pearce (England)
Ulster lineup: 1. Eric O'Sullivan, 2. Rob Herring, 3. Marty Moore, 4. Alan O'Connor, 5. Kieran Treadwell, 6. Marcus Rea, 7. Nick Timoney, 8. Duane Vermeulen, 9. Nathan Doak, 10. Billy Burns, 11. Ethan McIlroy, 12. Angus Curtis, 13. James Hume, 14. Robert Baloucoune, 15. Michael Lowry.; Replacements: 16. Bradley Roberts (for Herring, 73), 17. Jack McGrath (for O'Sullivan, 67), 18. Tom O'Toole (for M. Moore, 54), 19. Sam Carter (for A. O'Connor, 62), 20. Greg Jones (for Vermeulen, 54), 21. David Shanahan (for Doak, 64), 22. Ben Moxham (for Curtis, 59), 23. Craig Gilroy (for Burns, 67).				Attendance: 12,000; Referee: Luke Pearce (England)

==== Round of 16 ====
9 April 2022	Toulouse (France)	20-26	(Ireland) Ulster	Stade Ernest-Wallon, Toulouse
	Try: Meafou 6'; Ntamack 79'; Con: Ramos (2) 7, 79'; Pen: Ramos 40'; Cards: Cruz Mallia (yellow card) 10'	Report; Match centre Highlights; Star of the Match: Robert Baloucoune	Try: Baloucoune (3) 12' 44' 66'; Warwick 58'; Con: Cooney (3) 13' 59' 66'	Attendance: 28,000; Referee: Wayne Barnes
Ulster lineup: 1. Eric O'Sullivan, 2. Rob Herring, 3. Marty Moore, 4. Alan O'Connor, 5. Iain Henderson, 6. Marcus Rea, 7. Nick Timoney, 8. Duane Vermeulen, 9. John Cooney, 10. Billy Burns, 11. Ben Moxham, 12. Stuart McCloskey, 13. James Hume, 14. Robert Baloucoune, 15. Michael Lowry.; Replacements: 16. Bradley Roberts (for Herring, 79), 17. Andrew Warwick (for O'Sullivan, 55), 18. Tom O'Toole (for M. Moore, 49), 19. Kieran Treadwell (for A. O'Connor, 53), 20. Jordi Murphy (for Marcus Rea, 53), 21. Nathan Doak (for Cooney, 71), 22. Luke Marshall (for McCloskey, 49), 23. Rob Lyttle (for Moxham, 10).				Attendance: 28,000; Referee: Wayne Barnes

16 April 2022	Ulster (Ireland)	23-30 (49-50 agg)	(France) Toulouse	Ravenhill Stadium, Belfast
	Try: McIlroy (2) 10', 37'; Con: Cooney (2) 11', 39'; Pen: Cooney (3) 18', 52', 68'; Cards: Baloucoune (yellow card) 2'; O'Toole (red card) 64'	Report; Match centre Highlights	Try: Ramos 21'; Ntamack 26'; Dupont 74'; Con: Ramos (3) 22', 27', 75'; Pen: Ramos (3) 1', 13', 63'; Cards: Delibes (yellow card) 5'	Attendance: 18,196; Referee: Matthew Carley
Ulster lineup: 1. Andrew Warwick, 2. Rob Herring, 3. Marty Moore, 4. Alan O'Connor, 5. Iain Henderson, 6. Marcus Rea, 7. Nick Timoney, 8. Duane Vermeulen, 9. John Cooney, 10. Billy Burns, 11. Ethan McIlroy, 12. Stuart McCloskey, 13. James Hume, 14. Robert Baloucoune, 15. Michael Lowry.; Replacements: 16. Bradley Roberts, 17. Eric O'Sullivan (for Warwick, 62), 18. Tom O'Toole (for M. Moore, 62), 19. Kieran Treadwell (for O'Connor, 52), 20. Jordi Murphy (for Marcus Rea, 52), 21. Nathan Doak, 22. Luke Marshall, 23. Rob Lyttle (for Burns, 57).				Attendance: 18,196; Referee: Matthew Carley

=== Friendlies ===
3 September 2021	Ulster (Ireland)	21–45	(England) Saracens	Kingspan Stadium
	Try: Rea; Warwick; Roberts; Con: Madigan (3)	Report	Try: Obatoyinbo; Tompkins; Woolstencroft; Segun; Harris (30; Con: Goode (2); Vunipola (2)
Ulster lineup: 1. Callum Reid, 2. John Andrew, 3. Ross Kane, 4. Mick Kearney, 5. Sam Carter (c), 6. Matty Rea, 7. Marcus Rea, 8. Greg Jones, 9. Nathan Doak, 10. Ian Madigan, 11. Ben Moxham, 12. Angus Curtis, 13. Stewart Moore, 14. Craig Gilroy, 15. Aaron Sexton.; Replacements: Bradley Roberts, Gareth Milasinovich, Marty Moore, Andrew Warwick, Alan O'Connor, Sean Reidy, Azur Allison, David McCann, Harry Sheridan, David Shanahan, Jude Postlethwaite, Ben Carson, Lewis Finlay, Conor Rankin

9 September 2021	Saracens (England)	3-33	(Ireland) Ulster	Honourable Artillery Company
	Pen: Lozowski	Report; Full game	Try: Timoney; Gilroy (2); Curtis; Andrew; Con: Cooney (3); Curtis
Ulster lineup: 1. Andrew Warwick, 2. Bradley Roberts, 3. Marty Moore, 4. Alan O'Connor, 5. Mick Kearney, 6. Greg Jones, 7. Sean Reidy, 8. Nick Timoney, 9. John Cooney, 10. Billy Burns, 11. Craig Gilroy, 12. Stewart Moore, 13. James Hume, 14. Robert Baloucoune, 15. Michael Lowry.; Replacements: John Andrew, Callum Reid, Marty Moore, Ross Kane, Sam Carter, Matty Rea, Marcus Rea, David McCann, Harry Sheridan, David Shanahan, Ethan McIlroy, Ben Moxham, Ian Madigan, Angus Curtis, Ben Carson.

== Women's personnel ==
=== Squad ===
Ulster Senior Women's Squad
**Props**: (Ireland) Ava Fannin; (Ireland) Hannah Harris; (Ireland) Sorcha MacLaimhim; (Ireland) Elizabeth McKeever; (Ireland) Aisling O'Connell; (Ireland) **Ilse van Staden**; **Hookers**: (Ireland) Aoife Cahill; (Ireland) Beth Cregan (c); **Locks**: (Ireland) Hannah Beattie; (Ireland) Keelin Brady; (Ireland) Taryn Schutzler	**Back row**: (Ireland) Claire Boles; (Ireland) Shannon Buller; (Ireland) India Daley; (Ireland) Katie Hetherington; (Ireland) Lauren Maginnes; (Ireland) Gemma McCamley; (Ireland) Beth McDowell; (Ireland) Helen McGhee; (Ireland) Stacey Sloan; **Scrum-halves**: (Ireland) Rachael McIlroy; **Out-halves**: (Ireland) Jemma Farrell; (Ireland) Toni Macartney; (Ireland) **Ashleigh Orchard**	**Centres**: (Ireland) Peita McAlister; (Ireland) Kelly McCormill; (Ireland) Fiona Tuite; **Wings**: (Ireland) Emma Jordan; (Ireland) Diane Ramsay; (Ireland) Jill Stephens; (Ireland) Fern Wilson; **Fullbacks**: (Ireland) Holly Brannigan; (Ireland) Ella Durkan; (Ireland) Dolores Hughes
(c) denotes the team captain, **Bold** denotes internationally capped players.

== Women's competitions and results ==
=== 2021-22 Women's Interprovincial Series ===
	Team	P	W	D	L	PF	PA	BP	Pts
1	Munster	3	3	0	0	100	19	0	12
2	Leinster	3	2	0	1	81	43	0	8
3	Connacht	3	0	1	2	31	60	1	3
4	Ulster	3	0	1	2	29	119	0	2

28 August 2021	**Ulster**	**5-50**	**Munster**	Ravenhill Stadium, Belfast
	Try: Beth Cregan	Report	Try: Chloe Pearse (3); Siobhán McCarthy; Muirne Wall, Chisom Ugweru; Nicole Cronin; Aoife Moore; Con: Nicole Cronin (3); Rachel Allen (2)
Ulster lineup: 1. Gemma McCamley, 2. Beth Cregan (c), 3. Aishling O'Connell, 4. Hannah Beattie, 5. Keelin Brady, 6. Helen McGhee, 7. India Daley, 8. Stacey Sloan, 9. Rachael McIlroy, 10. Jemma Farrell, 11. Emma Jordan, 12. Kelly McCormill, 13. Fiona Tuite (vc), 14. Peita McAlister, 15. Dolores Hughes.; Replacements: 16. Ilse van Staden, 17. Aoife Cahill, 18. Ava Fannin, 19. Taryn Schutzler, 20. Lauren Maginnes, 21. Toni Macartney, 22. Diane Ramsey, 23. Fern Wilson.

4 September 2021	**Leinster**	**57-12**	**Ulster**	Donnybrook Stadium, Dublin
	Try: E. O'Byrne-White; L. Callan; N. Caughey; E. Roberts (2); N. Byrne; M. Claffey (2); G. Miller; E. McKeown; V. O'Mahony; Con: J. Murphy	Report	Try: I. Van Staden; T. Schutzler; Con: J. Farrell
Ulster lineup: 1. Hannah Harris, 2. Beth Cregan (c), 3. Aishling O'Connell, 4. Taryn Schutzler, 5. Keelin Brady, 6. India Daley, 7. Katie Hetherington, 8. Stacey Sloan, 9. Jemma Farrell, 10. Toni Macartney, 11. Fern Wilson, 12. Kelly McCormill, 13. Fiona Tuite (vc), 14. Peita McAlister, 15. Dolores Hughes.; Replacements: 16. Ilse van Staden, 17. Sorcha Mac Laimhin, 18. Elizabeth McKeever, 19. Shannon Butler, 20. Lauren Maginnes, 21. Rachel McIlroy, 22. Ashleigh Orchard, 23. Jill Stephens.

11 September 2021	**Connacht**	**12-12**	**Ulster**	Donnybrook Stadium, Dublin
	Try: Shannon Touhy; Ursula Sammon; Con: Nicole Fowley	Report	Try: Helen McGhee; Shannon Buller; Con: Beth Cregan
Ulster lineup: 1. Aishling O'Connell, 2. Beth Cregan (c), 3. Ilse van Staden, 4. Taryn Schutzler, 5. Keelin Brady, 6. Claire Boles, 7. Lauren Maginnes, 8. Stacey Sloan, 9. Jemma Farrell, 10. Toni Macartney, 11. Fern Wilson, 12. Kelly McCormill, 13. Ashleigh Orchard (vc), 14. Fiona Tuite (vc), 15. Ella Durkan.; Replacements: 16. Ava Fannin, 17. Elizabeth McKeever, 18. Shannon Buller, 19. Helen McGhee, 20. Katie Hetherington, 21. Rachel McIlroy, 22. Peita McAllister, 23. Holly Brannigan.
