= 2020 Pro14 Grand Final =

Rugby union match

- Event: 2019–20 Pro14
Leinster	Ulster
(Ireland)	(Ireland)
27	5
- Date: 12 September 2020
- Venue: Aviva Stadium, Dublin
- Man of the Match: (Ireland) Josh van der Flier
- Referee: Andrew Brace (IRFU)
- Attendance: 0 (Note: This game was played behind closed doors due to COVID-19 restrictions.)

The 2020 Pro14 Grand Final was the final match of the 2019–20 Pro14 season. The 2019–20 season was the sixth with Guinness as the title sponsor, the eleventh with a grand final and the third season with 14 teams, following the admission of two Italian teams. The match was planned to be held at Cardiff City Stadium, however, on 19 March 2020, Celtic Rugby DAC cancelled the event due to the COVID-19 pandemic. The re-arranged match took place on 12 September 2020 at the Aviva Stadium between defending champions Leinster and Ulster. Leinster won the match 27–5 to defend their title and complete a hat-trick of title wins.

== Route to the final ==
The top two sides from each of the two conferences met in the semi-finals, with the higher placed team having home advantage. Teams placed second and third in opposite conferences would have met in the two quarter-finals, but this was scrapped this year. The play-offs took place immediately following the final round of derby fixtures.

Semi-finals
4 September 2020
(Ireland) Leinster (A1)	13
(Ireland) Munster (B2)	3
5 September 2020
(Scotland) Edinburgh (B1)	19
(Ireland) Ulster (A2)	22

Final
12 September 2020
(Ireland) Leinster	27
(Ireland) Ulster	5

=== Semi-finals ===
4 September 2020
19:35

Leinster (Ireland)	13–3	(Ireland) Munster
Try: R. Kelleher 27' c Con: Sexton (1/1) 28'; Pen: Sexton (2/3) 40', 67'	Report	Pen: Hanrahan (1/3) 5'

Aviva Stadium
Attendance: 0
Referee: Andrew Brace (IRFU)

5 September 2020
19:35

Edinburgh (Scotland)	19–22	(Ireland) Ulster
Try: McInally 14' m Graham 46' c Dean 57' c Con: Van der Walt (2/3) 47', 59'	Report	Try: Lyttle 54' c Herring 62' m Andrew 75' c Con: Burns (1/2) 55'; Madigan (1/1) 76'; Pen: Madigan (1/1) 80'

Murrayfield Stadium
Attendance: 0
Referee: Frank Murphy (IRFU)

== Pre-match ==
The match was televised free-to-air by TG4 in the Republic of Ireland, and on BBC in Northern Ireland. It was also shown on Eir Sport.

== Final ==
=== Details ===
12 September 2020
19:35

Leinster (Ireland)	27–5	(Ireland) Ulster
Try: Lowe 12' c Henshaw 45' c Doris 71' c Con: R. Byrne (2/2) 14', 47'; Sexton (1/1) 72'; Pen: R. Byrne (2/2) 26', 44'	Report	Try: Hume 3' m

Aviva Stadium
Attendance: 0
Referee: Andrew Brace (IRFU)

Leinster	Ulster

FB	15	(Ireland) Jordan Larmour
RW	14	(Ireland) Hugo Keenan
OC	13	(Ireland) Garry Ringrose (c)	(substituted off) 67'
IC	12	(Ireland) Robbie Henshaw
LW	11	(Ireland) James Lowe
FH	10	(Ireland) Ross Byrne	(substituted off) 59'
SH	9	(Ireland) Jamison Gibson-Park	(substituted off) 59'
N8	8	(Ireland) Jack Conan
OF	7	(Ireland) Josh van der Flier	(substituted off) 72'
BF	6	(Ireland) Caelan Doris
RL	5	(Ireland) James Ryan	(substituted off) 62'
LL	4	(Ireland) Devin Toner
TP	3	(Ireland) Andrew Porter	(substituted off) 62'
HK	2	(Ireland) Rónan Kelleher	(substituted off) 59'
LP	1	(Ireland) Cian Healy	(substituted off) 52'
Substitutions:
HK	16	(Ireland) James Tracy	(substituted in) 59'
PR	17	(Ireland) Ed Byrne	(substituted in) 52'
PR	18	(Ireland) Michael Bent	(substituted in) 62'
LK	19	(Australia) Scott Fardy	(substituted in) 62'
FL	20	(Ireland) Will Connors	(substituted in) 72'
SH	21	(Ireland) Luke McGrath	(substituted in) 59'
FH	22	(Ireland) Johnny Sexton	(substituted in) 59'
CE	23	(Ireland) Rory O'Loughlin	(substituted in) 67'
Coach:
(Ireland) Leo Cullen

FB	15	(Ireland) Michael Lowry
RW	14	(Ireland) Rob Lyttle
OC	13	(Ireland) James Hume
IC	12	(Ireland) Stuart McCloskey
LW	11	(Ireland) Jacob Stockdale
FH	10	(Ireland) Billy Burns	(substituted off) 54'
SH	9	(New Zealand) Alby Mathewson	(substituted off) 47'
N8	8	(South Africa) Marcell Coetzee	(substituted off) 47'
OF	7	(Ireland) Sean Reidy
BF	6	(Ireland) Matty Rea	(substituted off) 55'
RL	5	(Ireland) Iain Henderson (c)	(substituted off) 47'
LL	4	(Ireland) Alan O'Connor
TP	3	(Ireland) Tom O'Toole	(substituted off) 55'
HK	2	(Ireland) Rob Herring	(substituted off) 20'	(substituted in) 34'	(substituted off) 72'
LP	1	(Ireland) Eric O'Sullivan	(substituted off) 47'
Substitutions:
HK	16	(Ireland) John Andrew	(substituted in) 20'	(substituted off) 34'	(substituted in) 72'
PR	17	(Ireland) Jack McGrath	(substituted in) 47'
PR	18	(Ireland) Marty Moore	(substituted in) 55'
LK	19	(Australia) Sam Carter	(substituted in) 47'
BR	20	(Ireland) Jordi Murphy	(substituted in) 55'
SH	21	(Ireland) John Cooney	(substituted in) 47'
FH	22	(Ireland) Ian Madigan	(substituted in) 54'
BR	23	(Ireland) Nick Timoney	(substituted in) 47'
Coach:
(England) Dan McFarland

Man of the Match:
(Ireland) Josh van der Flier

Assistant referees:
George Clancy (IRFU)
Frank Murphy (IRFU)
Television match official:
Brian MacNiece (IRFU)
