= Ben Moxham =

Irish rugby union player

- Born: 9 June 2001 (age 25) Larne, Northern Ireland
- Height: 1.91 m (6 ft 3 in)
- Weight: 108 kg (17.0 st; 238 lb)
- School: Larne High School
- University: Ulster University

Rugby union career
- Position: Centre / Wing
Amateur team(s)
Years	Team	Apps	(Points)
2022-2024	Ballynahinch	6	(5)
- Correct as of 24 January 2026
Senior career
Years	Team	Apps	(Points)
2020–26	Ulster	41	(5)
- Correct as of 24 April 2026
International career
Years	Team	Apps	(Points)
2020-21	Ireland U20	5	(0)
- Correct as of 19 May 2022

Ben Moxham (born 9 June 2001) is an Irish rugby union player who played wing or centre for Ulster in the United Rugby Championship and the European Rugby Champions Cup.

A native of Larne, County Antrim, Moxham attended Larne High School where he mainly played soccer, until he joined Larne Rugby Club in about 2016. He was picked for Ulster at age-grade levels, and moved to All-Ireland League club Ballymena. He was first selected for Ireland under-20s in February 2020, and played in the 2020 Six Nations Under 20s Championship in July.

He made his senior debut for Ulster as a replacement against Connacht in December 2020. He made four appearances, all from the bench, in the 2020–21 season. He was selected for the 2021 Six Nations Under 20s Championship in June 2021, while studying Sports Studies at Ulster University.

He began the 2021-22 season in his second year in the Ulster Academy, and was upgraded to a development contract in December 2021. This season, he made 13 appearances, including six starts. He made first Champions Cup appearance in January 2022, and his first Champions Cup start against Toulouse in April. His career was curtailed by injury: he sustained two anterior cruciate ligament injuries, the first in December 2023, the second in November 2024. He left Ulster at the end of the 2025-26 season, having made 41 appearances for the province and scored one try.
