= Andrew Warwick =

Northern Irish rugby union player (born 1991)

- Born: Andrew Warwick; 12 March 1991 (age 35) Ballymena, Northern Ireland
- Height: 1.78 m (5 ft 10 in)
- Weight: 116 kg (18 st 4 lb; 256 lb)
- School: Ballymena Academy

Rugby union career
- Position: Prop
- Current team: Ulster
Amateur team(s)
Years	Team	Apps	(Points)
- Ballymena
Senior career
Years	Team	Apps	(Points)
2013–2025	Ulster	212	(20)
- Correct as of 16 May 2025
International career
Years	Team	Apps	(Points)
2013-2015	Emerging Ireland	3	(0)
- Correct as of 10 January 2021

Andrew Warwick is an Irish rugby union player who plays loosehead prop for Ulster Rugby.

He started out playing for Ballymena in the All-Ireland League, while working for his father's engineering firm. He was involved with Ulster's sub-academy, representing the province at under-19 and under-20 level before being brought into the academy by elite performance director Allen Clarke. He played for Ulster "A", and was named on the bench for the senior team during the 2012–13 season, before signing an academy contract. He made his senior debut in February 2014 against the Cardiff Blues, and was pressed into action at tighthead in place of the injured John Afoa, earning praise from coach Mark Anscombe for his doggedness. He signed a 2-year developmental contract with Ulster in December 2014. He made his 100th appearance for the province in a Pro14 match against Munster in 2018.

In the summer of 2019 he developed a problem with his sciatic nerve, which eventually required surgery in August 2020. On his return he was Ulster's fourth-choice loosehead prop, but after he came off the bench and stabilised Ulster's shaky scrum against Connacht in only his fourth game back, he underlined his importance to the team. In the 2021-22 season, he competed with Eric O'Sullivan to be Ulster's first choice loosehead prop, starting most of their Champions Cup matches. He made his 150th appearance in a United Rugby Championship match against the Bulls in 2022. He was nominated for Ulster's men's player of the year award.

Ulster head coach Dan McFarland describes him as "a quality scrummager and hard worker in the loose", and notes his "experience and technical excellence". He praises him for being "a really good scrummager, his mauling is excellent, his maul defence is excellent. He's where he needs to be when he needs to be there ... The more experience that he's got in terms of scrummaging at the Champions Cup level, he's demonstrated that he's well able for that ... he's pushed himself where he maybe sat a little lower in the depth chart to one who is battling it out to be the first-choice loosehead in our club". He made his 200th appearance for Ulster against Connacht in October 2024. He left Ulster at the end of the 2024-25 season.

As of November 2021, he is also coaching the forwards at Ballymena rugby club.
