= David Carter (rugby union) =

- Full name: David Grierson Carter
- Born: 7 December 1961 (age 64) Quirindi, NSW, Australia
- School: Scots College, Sydney
- Notable relative: Sam Carter (son)

Rugby union career
- Position: Flanker / No. 8
International career
Years	Team	Apps	(Points)
1988–89	Australia	5	(4)

David Grierson Carter (born 7 December 1961) is an Australian former rugby union international.

Carter was born in the New South Wales town of Quirindi and attended Sydney's Scots College.

A back-row forward, Carter was a NSW Country captain and gained five caps for the Wallabies, debuting as a number eight against the touring England team in 1988. He was capped twice as a flanker on the 1989 tour of France.

Carter is the father of former Wallabies lock Sam Carter.

== See also ==
- List of Australia national rugby union players
