= Ethan McIlroy =

Irish rugby union player (born 2000)

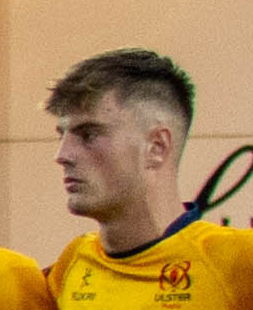
- Born: 10 August 2000 (age 26) Belfast, Northern Ireland
- Height: 1.88 m (6 ft 2 in)
- Weight: 90 kg (14 st; 200 lb)
- School: Methodist College Belfast

Rugby union career
- Position: Wing / Fullback
Amateur team(s)
Years	Team	Apps	(Points)
2023-	Ballynahinch	2	(5)
- Correct as of 24 January 2026
Senior career
Years	Team	Apps	(Points)
2020–	Ulster	81	(50)
- Correct as of 31 October 2026
International career
Years	Team	Apps	(Points)
2020	Ireland U20	2	(5)
2022	Emerging Ireland	1	(0)
- Correct as of 15 October 2022

Ethan McIlroy (born 10 August 2000) is an Irish rugby union player who plays wing or fullback for Ulster in the United Rugby Championship and the European Rugby Champions Cup.

He attended Methodist College Belfast, playing fullback in the Methody team that defeated Campbell College 45–17 in the Ulster Schools' Cup final in 2019. He made his debut for Ulster against Leinster in December 2019, while still in the province's sub-academy. He made two starts for Ireland in the 2020 Six Nations Under 20s Championship. He was named Ulster "A" Player of the Year in the 2020 Ulster Rugby Awards. He signed an academy contract for the 2020–21 season, and, alongside David McCann, was awarded the Jack Kyle Bursary by the Ulster Rugby Supporters Club. That season he made 14 senior appearances, including seven starts, and scored two tries.

He signed a development contract ahead of the 2021–22 season, during which, mainly playing on the wing, he made 22 appearances including 21 starts, and scored five tries, including two in Ulster's Champions Cup round of 16 defeat to Toulouse. Rugby Pass named him as one of the URC's breakout stars of the season, and he won Ulster's Young Player of the Year award. He was selected for the Emerging Ireland squad for the Toyota Challenge in South Africa in September 2022.
