= Larne High School =

Secondary school in County Antrim, Northern Ireland

Location
- 20 Sallagh Park; Larne, County Antrim, Northern Ireland; United Kingdom; 54.858328°N 5.819472°W

Information
- Type: Integrated
- Motto: Ad Vera Pretenda (We seek the truth)
- Religious affiliation: Christian
- Established: September 1957
- Principal: Stephen Reid
- Gender: Mixed
- Age range: 11-18
- Houses: Discovery, Endeavour, and Valour
- Colours: Navy, White, Yellow
- Website: www.larnehigh.org.uk

Larne High School is a secondary school in Larne, County Antrim, Northern Ireland.

The foundation stone on the High School site was laid on 26 July 1955, and the school opened in September 1957. It was then known as Greenland Intermediate Secondary School and was the first of its type in County Antrim. It had just over five hundred pupils and a staff of forty. Today pupils range from the age of eleven to eighteen, and can sit exams at Key Stage 3, GCSE, GNVQ and A-level.

== Curriculum ==
Key Stage 3: Years 8–10
Art & Design	French	ICT	Physical Education
Biology	Geography	Learning for Life & Work	Physics
Chemistry	History	Mathematics	Religious Studies
English	Home Economics	Music	Technology and Design

Students study 3 subjects at AS and A2 Level.

AS & A2 Level: Years 13–14
Art and Design	Business Studies	Chemistry	Computing	French
Geography	Government and Politics	Health & Social Care	Home Economics	ICT
Mathematics	Music	Physical Education	Physics	Psychology
Religious Studies	Spanish	Technology and Design	Travel and Tourism	

- Bold subjects are taught at Larne Grammar School, with students having to achieve at least an A Grade at GCSE to be considered, in accordance with Larne Grammar School admissions policies.
