= Rainey RFC =

Irish rugby union club based in Magherafelt, Co.Londonderry, N.Ireland

(Northern Ireland) Rainey RFC
- Full name: Rainey Rugby Football Club
- Union: (Ireland) IRFU
- Branch: Ulster
- Nickname: Old Boys
- Founded: 1928; 98 years ago
- Ground(s): Hatrick Park, Magherafelt, Northern Ireland
- Chairman: Gareth Bryson
- President: Dylan Davies
- Director of Rugby: Graeme Eastwood
- Coach: Graeme Eastwood
- Captain: Adam Montgomery
- League: A.I.L. Div. 2BN
- 2026–27: 6th.
1st kit	2nd kit

Official website
- raineyrfc.com

Rainey Rugby Football Club is a rugby union club situated in the market town of Magherafelt, County Londonderry, Northern Ireland playing in Division 2B of the All-Ireland League.

At present, they field 3 senior men's teams, 1 senior women's team, and 3 youth teams (the Rhinos) under-18s, under-16s, and under-14s as well as a girls under-14s side and a mini rugby section from 4 years old and upwards.

== History ==
=== Junior rugby ===
The club was founded in 1928 as Magherafelt RFC. It was renamed Rainey Old Boys RFC in 1947 in recognition of its connection with Rainey Endowed School. When former Rainey Endowed School coach Dawson McConkey joined the club as player-coach in the mid-1960s, success began to follow, and by the mid-1970s, they were a leading club in Ulster junior rugby. In 1982 they toured the Bahamas, and in 1983 they won the Ulster Towns Cup for the first time, with a team featuring forme Ireland international Harry Steele and Ulster regular Alan McLean. Club President from 1984 to 1990 was Bertie McConnell, a member of Ireland's 1948 Grand Slam-winning side. Coached by former Ballymena RFC number eight John Andrews, they were champions of the Ulster Qualifying League in 2005, but lost the playoffs for promotion to the All-Ireland. The following season they won the inaugural All-Ireland Junior Cup, and secured senior status by winning the AIL promotion playoffs.

=== Senior rugby ===
2006-07 was Rainey's first season in senior rugby, and they finished seventh in Division 3 of the All-Ireland League, and sixth in the Ulster Senior League. Coach John Andrews left at the end of the season to coach Dungannon RFC. replaced by former Ireland international Willie Anderson, then by Rhys Botha as player-coach in 2008.

Rainey Old Boys finished 10th in AIB Division Three in the 2008–09 season.

Rainey Old Boys finished 10th again in AIB Division Three in the 2009–10 season and 6th in AIB Division Three in the 2010–11 season.

The following season they narrowly missed out on promotion to AIB Division 2A, coming 5th in the 2011–12 season. Finishing 4 points behind second place and promotion.

In the 2012–13 they won AIB Division 2B, going undefeated in the league the whole season, winning 14 and drawing 1. Having scored more points, as well as conceding fewer, than any other team in the whole All-Ireland League, they gained promotion in some style. In what was to be the most successful season in the club's history, they also reached the final of the Ulster Senior Cup against all the odds, knocking out giants of Ulster rugby, Dungannon R.F.C. and Malone R.F.C., both away from home, en route to Ravenhill.

Chris Campbell and Richard Boyd took over the coaching reins of the club until 2013 after the 1st XV gained promotion into 2A after an undefeated season in 2B, winning 14 matches and drawing 1. This was a highly successful season for the club, who also contested their first-ever Senior Cup final in Ravenhill in December 2012, where they were beaten by a strong Ballymena side.

Richard Boyd remained as head coach, assisted by John Andrews, until 2015.

John Andrews was Head Coach between 2015-2021 and over that period was assisted by Damien Campbell and Terry McMaster. Following relegation due to a re-jigging of the leagues in 2016, Rainey was promoted to 2B once again in 2017 by beating Tullamore in the playoff final at Hatrick Park.

There was heartbreak the following year when a last minute Navan try at Hatrick Park prevented them from gaining promotion to 2A in 2018. This heartbreak was soon forgotten about the following season when the 1st XV regrouped for the 2018/19 season and performed consistently all year to secure a place in the playoffs for the 3rd season in a row. After beating Greystones away in a tight game in the semifinal, they travelled to Stradbrook to take on Irish Rugby Kingpins, Blackrock College RFC in the final. Rainey achieved promotion to Division 2A of the Energia AIL with a 35-21 victory on a sunny day in Stradbrook in one of the most famous days in the club's history.

History was also created 8 months later in December 2019 when Rainey won the Ulster Senior League for the first time in their history.

After an enforced break from competitive rugby due to the coronavirus pandemic, Rainey competed in Division 2A of the Energia AIL in 2021/22 season and were unfortunately relegated to 2B following a play off loss to Nenagh Ormond.

Rainey finished 6th in Division 2B of the Energia AIL in the 2022/23 and finished top of Section 1B of the Ulster Senior League in the same season. The team finished 7th in Division 2B of the Energia AIL in the 2023/24 season.

In May 2024, it was announced that former Ulster, Glasgow, and Castres second row, Tim Barker would be the Head Coach for the 2024/25 season. Tim had previously played for Rainey for many years and had been an assistant coach for the previous 2 seasons.

Tim had a successful 2 years at the helm, with the team narrowly missing out on the play-offs of AIL 2B on both occasions.

In May 2026, Graeme Eastwood was announced as the new 1st XV Head Coach.

Rainey will compete in the newly regionalised Division 2BN of the AIL in the 2026/27 season. Division 2B of the AIL has been split regionally into north and south.

Hooker Bradley Roberts was called into the Ulster Rugby squad in November 2020 and made his debut away to Edinburgh on 30 November 2020. He follows in the footsteps of fellow Rainey man Tommy O'Hagan who played for Ulster in the 2018/19 season. Roberts made his Welsh debut against South Africa in November 2021.

Local musician and former 1st XV Waterboy and Ballboy, J.C Stewart filmed part of a music video for MTV at the club in November 2019.

The club was renamed Rainey RFC in 2023.

== Honours ==
- All-Ireland Junior Cup: (1) 2005–06
- Ulster Youth Cup:
  - 2022–23 (U16)
  - 2021–22 (U14)
- Ulster Youth Plate:
  - 2022–23 (U18)
- Ulster Senior League: (1) 2019–20
- Ulster Towns Cup: (2) 1982–83, 2000–01
- Ulster Junior Cup: (2) 1975–76, 1978–79

== Internationals ==
Dr A.A McConnell - Ireland

Bradley Roberts - Wales

Harry Steele - Ireland

Paul Pritchard - Germany

Conor Brockschmidt - Germany

Mark Harbison - British Virgin Islands

Paul Kelly - Bermuda

Stephen McKinstry - (Ireland Under 19s)

Stephen Beattie - United States Under 19s

Michael Glancy - (Ireland Under 21s) and Hong Kong National Team

Connor Lavery - (Ireland Under 19s)

John McCusker - Ireland U18s

Jack McIntosh - Ireland U18s

Mark Lee - Ireland U18s
