= Bradley Roberts (rugby union) =

Wales international rugby union player

- Born: 4 January 1996 (age 30) Durban, South Africa
- Height: 1.75 m (5 ft 9 in)
- Weight: 108 kg (238 lb)
- School: Michaelhouse

Rugby union career
- Position: Hooker
Amateur team(s)
Years	Team	Apps	(Points)
2015	RGC 1404		
2017–2021	Rainey Old Boys		
Senior career
Years	Team	Apps	(Points)
2020–2022	Ulster	18	(15)
2022–2024	Dragons	27	(25)
- Correct as of 4th August 2026
International career
Years	Team	Apps	(Points)
2021–2024	Wales	5	(5)
- Correct as of 4th August 2026

Bradley Roberts is a former rugby union player who played as a hooker for United Rugby Championship side Dragons RFC. He was called up to play international rugby for Wales in 2021.

Roberts was born in Durban, South Africa where he attended Durban Preparatory High School and then Michaelhouse. After school, having failed to get an academy or development contract with a South African provincial team, he moved to Colwyn Bay, north Wales, and joined RGC 1404 in mid-season. He returned to South Africa in the summer, where he trained and played with the Sharks at under-19 level. When no contract was offered, he began studying at Stellenbosch University in Cape Town.

In 2017 he was invited to join Rainey Old Boys in Magherafelt, County Londonderry, after their director of rugby, Brian Smyth, received a highlights video from a South African contact. He helped the team get promoted to division 2A of the All Ireland League in 2018-19. His impressive club performances led to his call up to the Ulster squad as injury cover at hooker. He was named in the side for Round of the 2020–21 Pro14 against Edinburgh. He made his Ulster debut in this match, coming on as a replacement. He was selected for his second appearance against Connacht on 27 December 2020. He came on in the 68th minute for John Andrew. He signed a one-year professional contract in April 2021.

Roberts was called up to play for Wales in the 2021 Autumn internationals, having qualified through his paternal grandmother, who was from Llandysul. To remain available to play for Wales, he left Ulster and joined Welsh side Dragons RFC on a long-term contract at the end of the 2021-22 season.

Roberts went on to win five caps for Wales before announcing his retirement from rugby in August 2024 due to a back injury.

== International tries ==
Try	Opponent	Location	Venue	Tests	Date	Result
1	France	Saint-Denis, France	Stade de France	2023 Six Nations	18 March 2023	Loss
