= Michael Lowry (rugby union) =

Irish rugby union player (born 1998)

- Born: 20 August 1998 (age 28) Belfast, Northern Ireland
- Height: 1.73 m (5 ft 8 in)
- Weight: 77 kg (12.1 st; 170 lb)
- School: Royal Belfast Academical Institution

Rugby union career
- Position(s): Fullback, Fly-half
Amateur team(s)
Years	Team	Apps	(Points)
2017–	Banbridge	4	(12)
Senior career
Years	Team	Apps	(Points)
2018–	Ulster	140	(150)
- Correct as of 31 October 2026
International career
Years	Team	Apps	(Points)
2018	Ireland U20	1	(0)
2022	Ireland	1	(10)
2022	Ireland A	2	(0)
- Correct as of 8 November 2025

Michael Lowry (born 20 August 1998) is an Irish rugby union player from Northern Ireland who plays fullback and out-half for United Rugby Championship and European Rugby Champions Cup side Ulster, and internationally for Ireland. Doubted early on because of his small stature, he has exceptional footwork and acceleration. Ireland coach Andy Farrell describes him as a "nightmare" to play against, praising his explosiveness and bravery.

Born in Belfast, Northern Ireland, Lowry attended Royal Belfast Academical Institution and captained the school to a Medallion Shield and three Ulster Schools' Cups in a row between 2015 and 2017, and represented Ulster at under-17, under-18 and under-19 level, as well as Ireland at under-19 level. After leaving school, he joined the Ulster academy ahead of the 2017–18 season. He debuted for Ireland under-20s in their final match of the 2018 World Rugby Under 20 Championship against Japan, which Ireland won 39–33.

He made his senior debut for Ulster on 29 September 2018, featuring off the bench in the province's 64–7 defeat at the hands of Munster. He made his European Rugby Champions Cup debut in Ulster's 24–10 win against English side Leicester Tigers in round 1 of the 2018–19 tournament on 13 October 2018. In 2018–19 he made sixteen appearances, including twelve starts, scored two tries, with 38 defenders beaten and 17 clean breaks. He was named Academy Player of the Season in the 2019 Ulster Rugby Awards. He signed his first senior contract with Ulster in February 2019, joining the senior squad ahead of the 2019–20 season. That season he made seven appearances, including 3 starts, but his season was curtailed by an ankle injury that required surgery. In 2020–21 he made 22 appearances, including 18 starts, scoring 53 points, making 159 carries with 54 defenders beaten and 15 clean breaks, and being named Man of the Match twice. He was named at fullback in the 2020–21 Pro14 Dream Team, and was invited to train with the Ireland squad for the 2021 summer internationals.

In 2021–22 he made 20 appearances, including 15 starts, and scored 22 points. He was called up to the Ireland squad for the 2022 Six Nations Championship, making his debut, and scoring two tries and providing a try assist, against Italy. He was named on the long list for EPCR European Player of the Year for his performances with Ulster in the Champions Cup, finishing the competition first in run metres with 770 and joint first for defenders beaten with 29. He was nominated for the Nevin Spence Young Player of the Year award by Rugby Players Ireland, and was named Ulster Rugby Supporters Club Player of the Year. He was called up to the Ireland squad for their 2022 tour of New Zealand. He made his 100th Ulster appearance against the Scarlets in May 2024.

== International Tries ==
As of 28 February 2022

Try	Opposing team	Location	Venue	Competition	Date	Result	Score
1	Italy	Dublin, Ireland	Aviva Stadium	2022 Six Nations Championship	27 February 2022	Win	57 – 6
2	Italy	Dublin, Ireland	Aviva Stadium	2022 Six Nations Championship	27 February 2022	Win	57 – 6
