= Tom O'Toole (rugby union) =

Irish rugby union player

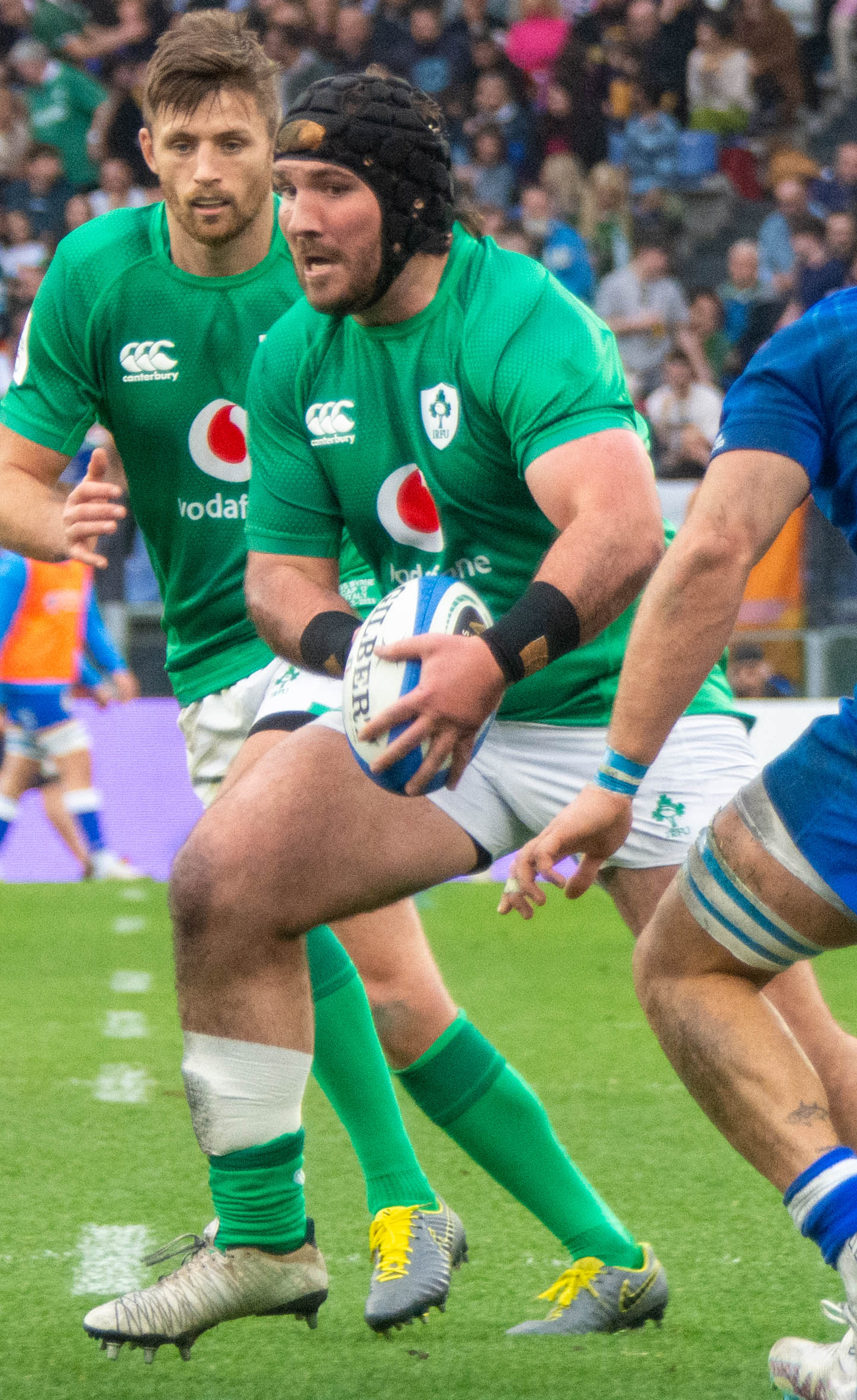
- O'Toole representing Ireland during the Six Nations Championship
- Full name: Thomas Niall O'Toole
- Born: 23 September 1998 (age 28) Drogheda, Ireland
- Height: 1.82 m (6 ft 0 in)
- Weight: 120 kg (265 lb; 18 st 13 lb)
- School: Campbell College

Rugby union career
- Position: Prop
- Current team: Ulster
Senior career
Years	Team	Apps	(Points)
2018–	Ulster	145	(40)
- Correct as of 24 October 2026
International career
Years	Team	Apps	(Points)
2018	Ireland U20	5	(0)
2021–	Ireland	27	(5)
2022–	Ireland A	3	(0)
- Correct as of 21 November 2026

Thomas Niall O'Toole (born 23 September 1998) is an Irish professional rugby union player who plays as a prop for United Rugby Championship club Ulster and the Ireland national team.

== Early life ==
Born in Drogheda, O'Toole lived in Ratoath, County Meath, until he was six years of age before moving to Brisbane in Queensland, Australia, for ten years due to his father's work commitments, where he attended Padua College. He was selected for the Queensland Reds development side and Queensland Schoolboys in 2015, before being connected with the Irish Exiles setup. He later moved to Campbell College in Belmont in the east of Belfast, which allowed him to link up with the Ulster and Ireland age grade setups, going on to play for Ireland at under-18, under-19 and under-20 level.

== Professional career ==
He joined the Ulster Rugby academy straight from school in 2017, and made his senior Ulster debut on 6 April 2018 in round 19 of the 2017–18 Pro14, starting in the provinces 32–20 away win against Scottish side Edinburgh. He made five senior appearances, including two starts, in the 2017–18 season, and won Academy Player of the Year at the 2018 Ulster Rugby Awards. He was awarded a development contract for the 2018–19 season, which would advance to a senior contract from the 2019–20 season until June 2022. during which he made 18 appearances, including 3 starts.

In the 2019–20 season, he made 22 appearances, including ten starts, and was named Young Player of the Year in the Ulster Rugby Awards. He received his first call up to the senior Ireland squad on 15 January 2020 for the 2020 Six Nations Championship.

In 2020–21, he made fifteen appearances, including two starts, and made 141 tackes and one turnover. In June 2021 he was called up again to the senior Ireland squad for the Summer tests, and made his senior international debut in a 71–10 victory over the United States on 10 July 2021. In the 2021–22 season, he has made 15 appearances, including eight starts, and appeared off the bench for Ireland in their 53–7 home win over Argentina in the 2021 Autumn internationals. He was called up to the Ireland squad for their 2022 tour of New Zealand. He was called up to Ireland's 2023 Six Nations Championship squad coming off the bench in all 5 matches as Ireland won the championship and Grand Slam. He was called up to the Ireland squad for their two-match tour of South Africa in July 2024.
