= Nick Timoney =

Irish rugby union player

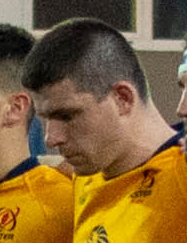
- Timoney in 2021
- Born: Nicholas Timoney; 1 August 1995 (age 31) Dublin, Ireland
- Height: 1.88 m (6 ft 2 in)
- Weight: 112 kg (247 lb; 17 st 9 lb)
- School: Blackrock College
- University: Queen's University Belfast

Rugby union career
- Position: Flanker
- Current team: Ulster
Amateur team(s)
Years	Team	Apps	(Points)
2014–2015	St Mary's College		
2015–2017	Queen's University		
2017–	Banbridge		
Senior career
Years	Team	Apps	(Points)
2017–	Ulster	188	(230)
- Correct as of 24 October 2026
International career
Years	Team	Apps	(Points)
2014–2015	Ireland U20	8	(0)
2021–	Ireland	17	(40)
2022–	Ireland Wolfhounds	1	(0)
- Correct as of 21 November 2026
National sevens team
Years	Team		Comps
2017	Ireland 7s		4

Nick Timoney (born 1 August 1995) is an Irish rugby union player, who plays in the back row for Ulster and Ireland. He is regarded as a "hybrid" player, an athletic forward with the pace of a back. He was named in the 2021–22 United Rugby Championship Dream Team.

In his youth, Timoney played number eight for Blackrock College in Dublin, helping his team win the 2013 Leinster Schools Senior Cup, and captaining his school during the successful 2014 season. He then played for St Mary's RFC in Division 1A of the All-Ireland League. He played for Leinster's age-grade teams up to under-20 level, and won eight caps for the Ireland under-20s, appearing in all three back row positions in the 2015 under-20 Six Nations and the 2015 World Rugby Under 20 Championship, but was not offered a place in the Leinster academy. He turned down an offer from Pau in the French Top 14, and joined Ulster's academy on a two-year contract ahead of the 2015–16 season. He made his first senior start towards the end of the 2016–17 season, with director of rugby Les Kiss remarking that he had had a "very good year". He played as a forward for the Ireland national rugby sevens team that played in the 2017 Sevens Grand Prix Series and took first place in the 2017 Moscow Sevens.

He made 20 appearances for Ulster in the 2017–18 season, scoring five tries and making 222 tackles, and was named Young Player of the Year and Academy Player of the Year in the Ulster Rugby Awards. He was awarded his first senior contract in February 2018. In the 2018–19 season he made 27 appearances, and was the team's leading tackler with 303. In the 2020–21 season he made 17 appearances, making 212 tackles and 13 turnovers. After Marcell Coetzee's departure in March, he became the team's regular number eight, and was named Rugby Writers' Player of the Year in the Ulster Rugby Awards. In June 2021 he was called up to the senior Ireland squad for the Summer tests, and scored a try in his debut in a 71–10 victory over the United States on 10 July.

In the 2021–22 season, with the arrival of South African number eight Duane Vermeulen, he has primarily played at openside flanker. He captained Ulster for the first time on 20 February 2022 in an away win against Scarlets, and made his 100th appearance for the province in the second leg of the Champions Cup round of 16 tie against Toulouse in April the same year. He led the United Rugby Championship in tackles with 274, 64 ahead of Ulster teammate Alan O'Connor in second place. He also led the European Rugby Champions Cup in tackles at the end of the pool stage with 78, and was nominated for Ulster's men's player of the year award. He was called up to the Ireland squad for their 2022 tour of New Zealand and their two-match tour of South Africa in July 2024. He made his 150th appearance for Ulster against Connacht in October 2024.
