= Sam Carter (rugby union) =

Australian rugby union player

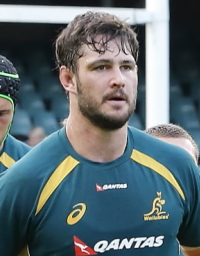
- Carter with the Wallabies in 2017
- Born: Sam Carter; 10 September 1989 (age 37) Sydney, New South Wales, Australia
- Height: 2.01 m (6 ft 7 in)
- Weight: 116 kg (18.3 st; 256 lb)
- School: Scots College
- University: University of Sydney

Rugby union career
- Position: Lock
- Current team: Western Force
Senior career
Years	Team	Apps	(Points)
2011–2019	ACT Brumbies	122	(45)
2015–2016	NSW Country Eagles	2	(0)
2016–2018	Canberra Vikings	9	(12)
2019–2023	Ulster	58	(30)
2023–2024	Leicester Tigers	15	(0)
2024–2025	Western Force	10	(5)
- Correct as of 21 May 2025
International career
Years	Team	Apps	(Points)
2014–2024	Australia	16	(0)
- Correct as of 27 June 2017
Medal record
Men's rugby union
Representing Australia
Rugby World Cup
Silver medal – second place	2015 England	Squad

Sam Carter (born 10 September 1989) is an Australian retired professional rugby union player who most recently played lock for Western Force in Super Rugby. He formerly played for the Brumbies from 2011 to 2019, and won 16 caps for Australia between 2014 and 2017, before spending 2019–2023 playing for Ulster in the URC he then played for Leicester Tigers in Premiership Rugby, England's top division.

== Career ==
His father, David Carter, was also an Australian international. He was educated at Scots College in Sydney, and represented Sydney University. He moved to Canberra to join the Brumbies Academy in 2010. He made his debut for the Brumbies in 2011 against the Melbourne Rebels, and soon became a regular in the team. He was made co-captain with Christian Leali'ifano in 2017, and became only the twelfth Brumbies player to make 100 appearances in 2018. He played for the Canberra Vikings in the inaugural season of the National Rugby Championship in 2014. He joined the New South Wales Country Eagles for the 2015 season. He first played for Australia in 2014, and won the last of his sixteen caps in 2017, before falling out with coach Michael Cheika. He signed for Ulster ahead of the 2019–20 season, but missed most of his first season there with a shoulder injury. He has since captained the side. On 25 May 2023 his signing was announced by Leicester Tigers in England's Premiership Rugby.

On 25 March 2024, he joined the Western Force in Australia. He retired in 2025 after the Force's match against the British and Irish Lions.

== Super Rugby statistics ==
As of 25 April 2022

Season	Team	Games	Starts	Sub	Mins	Tries	Cons	Pens	Drops	Points	Yel	Red
2011	Brumbies	1	0	1	14	0	0	0	0	0	0	0
2012	Brumbies	15	13	2	982	2	0	0	0	10	0	0
2013	Brumbies	18	17	1	1196	0	0	0	0	0	1	0
2014	Brumbies	16	16	0	1223	2	0	0	0	10	0	0
2015	Brumbies	13	13	0	955	0	0	0	0	0	1	0
2016	Brumbies	16	16	0	1234	1	0	0	0	5	1	0
2017	Brumbies	15	15	0	1179	2	0	0	0	10	0	0
2018	Brumbies	12	9	3	745	1	0	0	0	5	1	0
2019	Brumbies	17	16	1	1250	1	0	0	0	5	0	0
Total		122	114	8	8703	9	0	0	0	45	4	0
