= Alby Mathewson =

NZ international rugby union player

- Born: Albert Samuel Mathewson; 13 December 1985 (age 40) Hastings, New Zealand
- Height: 1.73 m (5 ft 8 in)
- Weight: 93 kg (14.6 st; 205 lb)
- School: Hastings Boys' High School
- University: Victoria University of Wellington

Rugby union career
- Position: Scrum-half
Senior career
Years	Team	Apps	(Points)
2006–2010	Wellington	56	(65)
2007–2009	Hurricanes	36	(20)
2010–2012	Blues	47	(65)
2011–2012	Auckland	20	(15)
2013–2016	Force	51	(26)
2013	Hawke's Bay	12	(10)
2016	Canterbury	3	(0)
2017	Bristol	10	(0)
2017	King Country	6	(5)
2017–2018	Toulon	19	(20)
2018–2019	Munster	27	(30)
2020–2021	Ulster	18	(10)
2022	Reds	0	(0)
- Correct as of 11 March 2022
International career
Years	Team	Apps	(Points)
2006	New Zealand U21	5	(5)
2008–2010	New Zealand	5	(0)
2009	Junior All Blacks	2	(5)
- Correct as of 1 July 2018

Albert Samuel Mathewson (born 13 December 1985) is a New Zealand rugby union player who plays as a scrum-half.

== Early life and education ==
Mathewson was born in Hastings, New Zealand. He first attended Havelock North High School but switched to Hastings Boys' High School to improve his game. He studied at Victoria University after finishing his schooling.

== Rugby ==
Mathewson made his Wellington debut in 2006 and Hurricanes debut in 2007, before shifting to the Blues in 2010. Mathewson made his international debut for New Zealand in 2010. In 2012, Mathewson signed a two-year contract with the Western Force in Australia, which he extended until 2016 two years later.

Mathewson joined Irish side Munster, who play in the United Rugby Championship and Champions Cup and have a history of playing New Zealand, on a four-month short-term contract in August 2018. Mathewson, who played against Munster for Toulon during the 2017–18 season and also played for New Zealand against Munster in November 2008, was signed as injury-cover for Ireland and British and Irish Lions international Conor Murray, who had been ruled out for a short period with a neck injury.

Mathewson made his debut for Munster on 29 September 2018, starting their 2018–19 Pro14 fixture against provincial rivals Ulster in Thomond Park, which Munster won 64–7. He scored his first try for Munster in the provinces 30–22 defeat at the hands of Leinster on 6 October 2018. He signed a three-month contract extension with Munster in November 2018. Mathewson's contract with Munster was again extended in February 2019, this time until the end of the 2018–19 season, before again being extended until the end of November 2019 to provide World Cup cover. His last appearance for Munster was in their 21–21 draw against French side Racing 92 in round two of the 2019–20 Champions Cup on 23 November 2019.

He joined Munster's provincial rivals Ulster on a one-year contract in July 2020, and made his debut for the province in their 26–20 defeat against Connacht on 23 August 2020. Mathewson was released by Ulster at the end of the 2020–21 season. He joined Australian Super Rugby side Queensland Reds on a short-term contract as injury cover for Tate McDermott in March 2022.

== Personal life ==
Mathewson and his wife, Cara Mathewson, have two sons together. The oldest was born in Wellington, New Zealand, in 2010. At the time Mathewson was training with the All Blacks. Their youngest was born in Perth, Australia in 2015.

== Super Rugby Statistics ==
As of 11 March 2022

Season	Team	Games	Starts	Sub	Mins	Tries	Cons	Pens	Drops	Points	Yel	Red
2007	Hurricanes	11	9	2	619	1	0	0	0	5	0	0
2008	Hurricanes	11	0	11	189	1	0	0	0	5	0	0
2009	Hurricanes	14	10	4	810	2	0	0	0	10	0	0
2010	Blues	13	13	0	939	6	0	0	0	30	0	0
2011	Blues	18	16	2	1161	6	0	0	0	30	0	0
2012	Blues	16	8	8	699	1	0	0	0	5	0	0
2013	Force	16	15	1	1142	1	0	0	0	5	2	0
2014	Force	9	8	1	564	1	0	0	0	5	0	0
2015	Force	14	11	3	813	1	0	0	0	5	1	0
2016	Force	11	10	1	623	0	0	0	0	0	0	0
2022	Reds	0	0	0	0	0	0	0	0	0	0	0
Total		133	100	33	7559	20	0	0	0	100	3	0
