= 2025–26 Zebre Parma season =

Zebre Parma
- Full name: Zebre Parma
- Union: (Italy) Federazione Italiana Rugby
- Nickname: The XV of the North-West (il XV del Nord-Ovest)
- Founded: 1973 (as Invitational Team – disbanded in 1997); 2012; 14 years ago (as Professional Team)
- Location: Parma, Italy
- Ground(s): Stadio Sergio Lanfranchi, Parma (Capacity: 5,000)
- President: Gianni Fava
- Coach: Massimo Brunello
- Captain: Giovanni Licata
- League: United Rugby Championship
1st kit	2nd kit

Official website
- www.zebreparma.it

The 2025–26 season is Zebre Parma's fifth season in the United Rugby Championship, and their 14th season of professional rugby. Along with competing in the URC and its Scottish-Italian Shield competition, the club will also participate in the 2025–26 EPCR Challenge Cup.

== Senior Squad ==
Zebre Parma United Rugby Championship squad (Note: Taking into account signings and departures head of 2025–26 season as listed on List of 2025–26 United Rugby Championship transfers.)
**Props**: (Italy) **Paolo Buonfiglio**; (Italy) Luca Franceschetto; (Italy) Muhamed Hasa; (Italy) **Ion Neculai**; (Italy) Matteo Nocera; (Argentina) Juan Pitinari*; (Italy) **Luca Rizzoli**; **Hookers**: (Italy) Tommaso Di Bartolomeo; (Italy) Giovanni Quattrini; (Italy) Giampietro Ribaldi; **Locks**: (Italy) Matteo Canali; (Argentina) Franco Carrera; (Italy) Leonard Krumov; (Italy) Alessandro Ortombina; (Italy) Francesco Ruffolo	**Back row**: (Italy) Iacopo Bianchi; (Italy) Giacomo Ferrari; (Italy) **Giovanni Licata**; (Italy) Samuele Locatelli; (Italy) David Odiase; (Italy) Davide Ruggeri; (Argentina) Bautista Stavile*; (Argentina) Guido Volpi*; **Scrum-halves**: (Argentina) Thomas Dominguez*; (Italy) **Alessandro Fusco**; (Argentina) **Gonzalo García**; **Fly-halves**: (Italy) **Giacomo Da Re**; (Italy) Giovanni Montemauri; (Argentina) Martin Roger Farias*	**Centres**: (Italy) **Giulio Bertaccini**; (Italy) **Enrico Lucchin**; (Italy) Damiano Mazza; (Italy) **Luca Morisi**; (Italy) **Marco Zanon**; **Wings**: (Italy) Albert Einstein Batista; (Italy) **Simone Gesi**; (Italy) **Jacopo Trulla**; **Fullbacks**: (Italy) **Mirko Belloni**; (Italy) **Lorenzo Pani**
(c) denotes the team captain, **Bold** denotes internationally capped players.^{*} denotes players qualified to play for Italy on residency or dual nationality. Players and their allocated positions from the Zebre Parma website.

=== Additional player squad ===
Zebre Parma Additional Players squad (Note: Additional player under contract with Serie A Elite team Colorno) (Note: Academy player on loan to Serie A team Noceto) (Note: Additional player under contract with Serie A Elite team Viadana) (Note: Additional player under contract with Serie A team Calvisano) (Note: Additional player under contract with Serie A team Rugby Parabiago) (Note: Additional player selected for F.I.R. Academy) (Note: Additional player under contract with Serie A Elite team Valorugby Emilia)
**Props**: None currently named; **Hookers**: None currently named; **Locks**: (Italy) Davide Salvan	**Back row**: (Italy) Giacomo Milano; **Scrum-halves**: (Italy) Nicolò Casilio; (South Africa) Migael Prinsloo; **Fly-halves**: None currently named	**Centres**: (Italy) Daniele Coluzzi; **Wings**: (Italy) Alessandro Ciofani; (Italy) Marcello Cortellazzi; (Italy) Tommaso Roda; **Fullbacks**: (Italy) Aramis Corona; (Italy) Giovanni Degli Antoni; (Italy) Edoardo Vitale
(c) denotes the team captain, **Bold** denotes internationally capped players.^{*} denotes players qualified to play for Italy on residency or dual nationality. Players and their allocated positions from the Zebre Rugby and F.I.R. website.

== Transfers ==
=== Players in ===
- (Italy) Francesco Ruffolo from (Italy) Colorno
- (Italy) David Odiase from (France) Oyonnax
- (Italy) Giulio Bertaccini from (Italy) Valorugby Emilia
- (Italy) Albert Einstein Batista from (Italy) Colorno
- (Italy) Mirko Belloni from (Italy) Rovigo
- (Italy) Samuele Locatelli from (Italy) Viadana
- (Argentina) Martin Roger Farias from (Italy) Viadana
- (Italy) Alessandro Ortombina from (France) Perpignan
- (Italy) Marco Zanon from (Italy) Benetton
- (Argentina) Franco Carrera from (Argentina) Pampas XV
- (Italy) Malik Faissal (promoted from Academy)
- (Italy) Giacomo Milano (promoted from Academy)
- (United States) Shilo Klein from (United States) San Diego Legion
- (Argentina) Enrique Pieretto from (France) Provence

=== Players out ===
- (Italy) Danilo Fischetti to (England) Northampton Saints
- (Italy) Andrea Zambonin to (England) Exeter Chiefs
- (Italy) Luca Bigi to (Italy) Valorugby Emilia
- (Italy) Filippo Bozzoni to (Italy) Colorno
- (Tonga) Fetuli Paea to (Wales) Dragons
- (Argentina) Gerónimo Prisciantelli to (France) Racing 92
- (New Zealand) Scott Gregory to (New Zealand) Southland
- (Italy) Ratko Jelic to (Italy) Viadana
- (Fiji) Rusiate Nasove to (Italy) Valorugby Emilia
- (Italy) Luca Andreani to (Italy) Fiamme Oro
- (Italy) Samuele Taddei to (Italy) Valorugby Emilia
- (Italy) Giacomo Milano to (Italy) Valorugby Emilia

== United Rugby Championship ==
=== Matches ===
27 September 2025	(1 BP) Zebre Parma (Italy)	31 – 28	(Scotland) Edinburgh (2 BP)	Stadio Sergio Lanfranchi, Parma
15:05	Try: D Bartolomeo (3'); Pitinari (12'); Gesi (34'); Fusco (44'); Con: Da Re(4', 13', 35', 45'); Pen: Roger (79')		Try: McConnell (17'); Bradbury (23'); Velacott (50'); Harrison (75'); Con: Healy (18', 24', 51', 76'); Cards: Licata (red card); Pitinari (yellow card) 64' to 74'	Attendance: 2 276; Referee: Ben Whitehouse (Wales)

5 October 2025	Zebre Parma (Italy)	22 – 20	(South Africa) Lions (1 BP)	Stadio Sergio Lanfranchi, Parma
14:00	Try: Stavile (12'); Di Bartolomeo (35'); Nocera (79'); Con: da Re (36'); Roger (80'); Pen: Roger (64')	Report	Try: Kotze (52'); Keyter (56'); Brandon (74'); Con: Dobela (75'); Pen: CW Smith (17')	Attendance: 2,175; Referee: Craig Evans (Wales)

11 October 2025	Ospreys (Wales)	24 – 0	(Italy) Zebre Parma	Brewery Field, Bridgend
15:00	Try: Cokanasiga (15'); Morse (18'); Ratti (74'); Con: D. Edwards (16', 18', 75'); Pen: D. Edwards (59')	Report		Attendance: 4,519; Referee: Eoghan Cross (Ireland)

18 October 2025	Zebre Parma	13 – 31	Stormers (1 BP)	Stadio Sergio Lanfranchi, Parma
19:45	Try: Belloni, (20'); Con: da Re (21'); Pen: da Re (63', 67'); Cards: Nocero (yellow card) 59'	Report	Try: de Villiers (6'); Feinberg-Mngomezulu, (37', 46'); Gelant, (58'); Nel (80'); Con: Feinberg-Mngomezulu, (38', 58', 80'+1)	Attendance: 2,176; Referee: Andrew Brace (Ireland)

25 October 2025	(1 BP) Leinster (Ireland)	50 – 26	(Italy) Zebre Parma (1 BP)	Aviva Stadium, Dublin
17:30	Try: Kenny (2' c, 27' c); Soroka (7' m, 12' c); Cahir (48' c); Byrne (55' m); Snyman (68' c); Connors (78' m); Con: (2', 13', 27', 49', 69'); Cards: A Osborne (red card) 30'	Report; Scoreboard; Highlights	Try: Belloni (10' c); Dominguez (20' c); Quattrini (32' c); Marco Zanon (73' m); Con: da Re (11', 21', 33'); Cards: Dominguez (red card) 37'	Attendance: 14,128; Referee: Ian Kenny (Scotland)

29 November 2025	Zebre Parma (Italy)	14 – 29	(Wales) Cardiff (1 BP)	Stadio Sergio Lanfranchi, Parma
13:00	Try: Licata (30' c); Zanon (74' c); Con: Roger (2/2) (31', 74'); Cards: Licata (yellow card) 16' to 26'; Ruggeri (yellow card) 49' to 59'; Zanon (yellow card) 82' to f.t.'	Report	Try: Hughes (13' c, 18' m, 40' c); Basham (80+3' c); Con: Lloyd (2/3) (19', 41'); Wilde (1/1) (80+4'); Pen: Lloyd (48'); Cards: Basham (yellow card) 69' to 79'	Attendance: 2,392; Referee: Marius van der Westhuizen (South Africa)

20 December 2025	Benetton (Italy)	21 – 15	(Italy) Zebre Parma (1 BP)	Stadio Comunale di Monigo, Treviso
14:00	Try: Mendy 26' c Gasperini 65' m Con: Umaga 26'; Pen: Umaga (3) 17', 30', 46'; Cards: Menoncello (yellow card) 51'	Report	Try: Ferrari 52' m Gesi 68' c Con: Montemauri 69'; Pen: Montemauri 38'	Attendance: 5,000; Referee: Gianluca Gnecchi (FIR)

27 December 2025	Zebre Parma (Italy)	23 – 37	(Italy) Benetton (1 BP)	Stadio Sergio Lanfranchi, Parma
14:30	Try: Gesi 43' c Faissal 79' c Con: Da Re 44'; Dominguez 80'; Pen: Da Re (3) 8', 13'. 31'; Cards: Ferrari (yellow card) 7'; Mazza (yellow card) 53'	Report	Try: Mendy 2' c penalty try 53'; Odogwu 62' c Werchon 70' c Con: Umaga (3) 3', 63' 71'; Pen: Umaga (3) 7', 18' 40+1'; Cards: Lamaro (yellow card) 25'	Attendance: 4,500; Referee: Clara Munarini (ITA)

3 January 2026	(1 BP) Glasgow Warriors (Scotland)	47 – 10	(Italy) Zebre Parma	Scotstoun Stadium, Glasgow
19:45	Try: McDowall 13'c Smith 20'c Stephen 39' m Dobie 59' c, 78' c Hiddleston 74' c Weir 77' c Con: Hastings (2) 13' 21'; Weir (3) 60' 74' 78'; Lancaster 79'	Report	Try: Bertaccini 23' m Quattrini 48' m Cards: Reggeri (yellow card) 40'	Attendance: 6,476; Referee: Ben Breakspear (Wales)

24 January 2026	(1 BP) Zebre Parma (Italy)	21 – 26	(Scotland) Glasgow Warriors (1 BP)	Stadio Sergio Lanfranchi, Parma
19:45	Try: Carrera 31' c Bertaccini 47' c Pani 69' c Con: Roger Farias (2/2) 31', 48'; Montemauri (1/1) 70'; Cards: Odiase (yellow card) 19'; Carrera (yellow card) 52'; Krumov (yellow card) 64'	Report	Try: penalty try 18'; Hiddleston (2) 24' c, 33' c Hastings 66' m Con: Horne (2/3) 25', 34'; Cards: Hastings (yellow card) 45'	Attendance: 1,803; Referee: Robbie Jenkinson

31 January 2026	Zebre Parma (Italy)	15 – 31	(Ireland) Connacht (1 BP)	Stadio Sergio Lanfranchi, Parma
15:00	Try: Garcia 56' m Stavile 74' c Con: Martin Roger 75'; Pen: Roger 26'; Cards: Garcia (yellow card) 60'; Zanon (yellow card) 80+10'	Report	Try: Joyce 41'; Jansen (2) 50' c, 61' c McCormack 80+11'; Con: Gilbert (4/4) 42', 51', 62', 80+12'; Pen: Gilbert 78'; Cards: Mullins (yellow card) 73'	Attendance: 2,545; Referee: Ben Whitehouse (Wales)

28 February 2026	Munster (Ireland)	21 – 7	(Italy) Zebre Parma	Thomond Park, Limerick
17:30	Try: Daly 7' c Kendellen 65' c Barron 71' c Con: JJ Hanrahan (3/3) 8', 66', 72'	Report	Try: Stavile 32' c Con: Da Re, 33'; Cards: Bertaccini (yellow card) 3'	Attendance: 12,558; Referee: Mike Adamson (Scotland)

20 March 2026	(1 BP) Scarlets (Wales)	36 – 17	(Italy) Zebre Parma	Parc y Scarlets, Llanelli
19:45	Try: Taylor (2) 2' m, 65' c Lousi 13' c Page 25' c Mee 36' m Davis 57' m Con: Leggatt-Jones(3/6) 14', 26', 66'	Report	Try: Gesi 64' m Stavile 79' m Odiase 83' c Con: Da Re (1/3) 84'	Attendance: 5,029; Referee: Peter Martin, (Ireland)

28 March 2026	Zebre Parma (Italy)	12 – 28	(Ireland) Ulster (1 BP)	Stadio Sergio Lanfranchi, Parma
19:45	Try: Di Bertolomeo 11' c Trulla 75' c Con: Roger (1/2) 12'; Cards: Gesi (red card) 28'	Report	Try: McAllister 20' c Herring 44' c Ward 52' c Kok 69' c Con: Humphreys (2/2) 21', 45'; Doak (2/2) 53', 69'; Cards: Wilson (yellow card) 84'	Attendance: 3,256; Referee: Craig Evans (Wales)

17 April 2026	(1BP) Edinburgh (Scotland)	31 – 30	(Italy) Zebre Parma (2 BP)	Edinburgh Rugby Stadium
19:45	Try: Boyle 5' c Patterson 19' c Ashman (2) 36' m, 61' m Venter 79' c Con: Thompson (2) 6', 20'; Scott 80'	Report	Try: Fusco 10' c Gesi 14' m Trulla 46' m Nocera 73' c Con: Montemauri (2/4) 11', 74'; Pen: Montemauri (2) 41', 67'	Attendance: 6,818; Referee: Christopher Allison (South Africa)

24 April 2026	(1 BP) Zebre Parma (Italy)	18 – 19	(Wales) Dragons	Stadio Sergio Lanfranchi, Parma
19:45	Try: Di Bartolomeo 43' m Locatelli 70' c Con: Da Re (1/2) 71'; Pen: Da Re (2) 14', 53'	Report	Try: Rosser 24' c Carter 68' c Richards 83' m Con: O'Brien (2/3) 25', 68'; Cards: Douglas (yellow card) 43'	Attendance: 3,417; Referee: Ru Campbell (Scotland)

9 May 2026	(1 BP) Bulls (South Africa)	54 – 19	(Italy) Zebre Parma	Loftus Versfeld Stadium, Pretoria
12:45	Try: le Roux 3' c Moodie 14' c Jooste 23' m Petersen 30' c Vermaak 49' c Hanekom 63' c Vorster 69' c Rudolph 77' c Con: le Roux (7/8) 4', 15', 31', 50', 63', 70', 78'	Report	Try: Trulla 20' c Ribaldi 41' m Dominguez 59' c Con: Roger (2/3) 21', 60'	Attendance: 5,685; Referee: Ben Whitehouse (Wales)

16 May 2026	(1 BP) Sharks (South Africa)	54 – 19	(Italy) Zebre Parma	Kings Park Stadium, Durban
12:45	Try: Wiliams 14' m Kolisi (2) 26' c, 41' c Siyaya 29' c Moyo 47' c Tshituka 54' c Malan 65' c Braude 68' c Con: Moyo (5/6) 27', 31', 42', 48', 55'; J Smith (2/2) 66', 68'	Report	Try: Faissal 20' c Gesi 63' c Quattrini 76' m Con: Montemauri (2/3) 21', 64'; Cards: Fusco (yellow card) 40'	Attendance: 8,428; Referee: Adam Jones

=== Standings ===
Pos	Team	Pld	W	D	L	PF	PA	PD	TF	TA	TB	LB	Pts	Qualification
1	Glasgow Warriors	18	13	0	5	479	338	+141	72	48	11	2	65	Qualification for the Champions Cup and knockout stage
2	Leinster (CH)	18	12	0	6	515	370	+145	77	51	13	2	63	Qualification for the Champions Cup and knockout stage
3	Stormers	18	12	1	5	504	344	+160	63	48	9	1	60	Qualification for the Champions Cup and knockout stage
4	Bulls (RU)	18	12	0	6	576	406	+170	82	59	10	1	59	Qualification for the Champions Cup and knockout stage
5	Munster	18	11	0	7	396	376	+20	59	51	8	3	55	Qualification for the Champions Cup and knockout stage
6	Cardiff	18	11	0	7	353	372	−19	52	52	7	4	55	Qualification for the Champions Cup and knockout stage
7	Lions	18	10	1	7	532	473	+59	73	70	9	3	54	Qualification for the Champions Cup and knockout stage
8	Connacht	18	10	0	8	442	395	+47	62	56	10	4	54	Qualification for the Champions Cup and knockout stage
9	Ulster	18	9	1	8	494	420	+74	72	60	10	4	52	Qualification for the Challenge Cup
10	Sharks	18	8	1	9	467	428	+39	71	57	9	3	46	Qualification for the Challenge Cup
11	Ospreys	18	7	2	9	376	454	−78	55	69	4	3	39	Qualification for the Challenge Cup
12	Edinburgh	18	7	0	11	362	439	−77	57	66	6	4	38	Qualification for the Challenge Cup
13	Benetton	18	6	2	10	327	493	−166	41	71	4	1	33	Qualification for the Challenge Cup
14	Scarlets	18	4	2	12	361	460	−99	52	63	3	5	28	Qualification for the Challenge Cup
15	Dragons	18	3	4	11	350	481	−131	46	71	4	4	28	Qualification for the Challenge Cup
16	Zebre	18	2	0	16	312	587	−275	43	85	3	4	15	Qualification for the Challenge Cup

Updated to match(es) played on 16 May 2026. Source: UnitedRugby.com
Rules for classification: Tiebreakers for teams tied on points: 1) Number of matches won 2) The difference between points for and points against 3) The number of tries scored 4) The most points scored 5) The difference between tries for and tries against 6) The fewest red cards received 7) The fewest yellow cards received.

2025–26 United Rugby Championship Regional Shield tables
(Italy) (Scotland) Italian x Scottish Shield
	Team	P	W	D	L	PF	PA	PD	TF	TA	TBP	LBP	Pts	Pos overall
1	(Scotland) Glasgow Warriors	6	5	0	1	163	72	+91	25	9	4	1	25	1
2	(Scotland) Edinburgh	6	3	0	3	132	120	+12	20	17	3	1	16	12
3	(Italy) Benetton	6	3	0	3	98	141	–43	10	19	1	1	14	13
4	(Italy) Zebre Parma	6	1	0	5	130	190	–60	17	26	2	3	9	16
If teams are level at any stage, tiebreakers are applied in the following order: 1. number of matches won 2. the difference between points for and points against 3. the number of tries scored 4. the most points scored 5. the difference between tries for and tries against 6. the fewest red cards received 7. the fewest yellow cards received
Green background indicates teams currently leading the regional shield. Upon the conclusion of the regular season, these teams win their respective regional shields. (S) : URC Shield champion

== EPRC Challenge Cup ==
=== Pool 1 table ===
EPCR Challenge Cup Pool 1
Pos	Team	Pld	W	D	L	PF	PA	PD	TF	TA	TB	LB	Pts	Qualification
1	(France) Montpellier (1)	4	4	0	0	119	77	+42	18	10	4	0	20	Home round of 16
2	(Italy) Zebre Parma (5)	4	3	0	1	99	81	+18	12	11	2	0	14	Home round of 16
3	(Ireland) Connacht (8)	4	2	0	2	179	71	+108	26	11	3	2	13	Home round of 16
4	(Wales) Ospreys (14)	4	2	0	2	102	97	+5	16	12	3	2	13	Away round of 16
5	(Georgia (country)) Black Lion	4	1	0	3	58	132	−74	8	20	1	0	5	
6	(France) Montauban	4	0	0	4	81	180	−99	11	25	1	1	2	

Source: EPCR
Rules for classification: Tiebreakers for teams tied on points: 1) Number of matches won; 2) Difference between points for and against; 3) Total number of points for; 4) Aggregate number of points scored in matches between tied teams; 5) Number of matches won excluding the first match, then the second and so on until the tie is settled.

=== Pool matches ===
6 December 2025	(1 BP) Zebre Parma (Italy)	41–17	(France) Montauban	Stadio Sergio Lanfranchi, Parma
21:00	Try: Faissal 25' c Stavile 28' c Ribaldi 44' c Gesi 57' c Fusco 62' c Con: Roger (5/5) 26', 28', 45', 58', 63'; Pen: Roger(10'); Da Re (1/1) 76'	Report	Try: Ahmed 42' c Pacolo 50' c Con: Bosviel (2/2) 43', 51'; Pen: Bosviel (1/1) 13'	Attendance: 1,302; Referee: Ben Connor (Wales)

12 December 2025	(1 BP) Montpellier (France)	31–7	(Italy) Zebre Parma	GGL Stadium, Montpellier
21:00	Try: Moustin 20' m Masibaka (2) 28' m, 66' c Tauleigne 61' c Verhaeghe 71' c Con: Miotti (3/5) 62', 67', 72'	Report	Try: Licata 10' c Con: Montemauri (1/1) 11'	Attendance: 7,771; Referee: Peter Martin (Ireland)

11 January 2026	Zebre Parma (Italy)	23–19	(Wales) Ospreys (1 BP)	Stadio Sergio Lanfranchi, Parma
14:00	Try: Fusco 21' c Locatelli 73' c Con: da Re (2/2) 23', 74'; Pen: da Re (3/3) 16', 27', 58'	Report	Try: Morse 44' c K. Williams 54' c Con: Edwards (2/3) 45', 55'	Attendance: 2,000; Referee: Griffin Colby (South Africa)

17 January 2026	Black Lion (Georgia (country))	14–28	(Italy) Zebre Parma (1 BP)	Avchala Rugby Stadium, Tbilisi
17:00	Try: Kvatadze (2) 2' c, 40' c Con: Tsirekidze (2/2) 3', 40+1'; Cards: Kakovin (yellow card) 32'	Report	Try: Pitinari 16' c Hasa 32' c Pani 63' c da Re 79' c Con: da Re (4/4) 17', 33', 64', 80'; Cards: Canali (yellow card) 39'; Locatelli (yellow card) 57'	Attendance: 2,123; Referee: Evan Urruzmendi (France)

=== Knockout stage ===
Zebre qualified for a home tie in the round of sixteen when they confirmed a top two finish in Pool 1 in Round 4 with a 28-14 victory over Black Lion Tbilisi of Georgia. Pau qualified to face them, having been redirected from the pool stages of the European Rugby Champions Cup.

A 31 – 15 victory earned Zebre a home quarter-final tie against Welsh regional side Dragons. It was the first ever win in European knockout rugby for the club.

Bracket

Round of 16
1	(France) Montpellier	53
16	(France) Perpignan	13
8	(Ireland) Connacht	29
9	(South Africa) Sharks	12
5	(Italy) Zebre Parma	31
12	(France) Pau	15
4	(France) Stade Français	31
13	(Wales) Dragons	36
3	(Ireland) Ulster	28
14	(Wales) Ospreys	24
6	(England) Newcastle Red Bulls	18
11	(France) La Rochelle	26
2	(Italy) Benetton	38
15	(Wales) Cardiff	35
7	(England) Exeter Chiefs	31
10	(Ireland) Munster	21

Quarter-finals
1	(France) Montpellier	45
8	(Ireland) Connacht	22
5	(Italy) Zebre Parma	32
13	(Wales) Dragons	35
3	(Ireland) Ulster	41
11	(France) La Rochelle	24
2	(Italy) Benetton	41
7	(England) Exeter Chiefs	44

Semi-finals
1	(France) Montpellier	18
13	(Wales) Dragons	12
3	(Ireland) Ulster	29
7	(England) Exeter Chiefs	12

Final
1	(France) Montpellier	59
3	(Ireland) Ulster	26

Round of 16

5 April 2026	Zebre Parma (Italy) (5)	31–15	(12) (France) Pau	Stadio Sergio Lanfranchi, Parma
18:30	Try: Stavile (2) 2' c, 65' c Trulla 25' c Pitinari 48' c Con: Da Re (4/4) 2', 26', 48', 66; Pen: Da Re (1/1) 75'; Cards: Stavile (yellow card) 38'; Licata (yellow card) 70'	Report	Try: Tuipulotu 42' m Gorgadze 71' m Butlin 77' m	Attendance: 2,259; Referee: Ben Breakspear (Wales)

Quarter-final

11 April 2026	Zebre Parma (Italy) (5)	32–35	(13) (Wales) Dragons	Stadio Sergio Lanfranchi, Parma
20:00	Try: Trulla 25' c Bertaccini 37' c Krumov 78' m Quattrini 81' c Con: Da Re (3/4) 26', 38', 82'; Pen: Da Re (2/1) 13', 63'	Report	Try: Inisi 14' c Keddie (2) 30' c, 51' c Dee 65' m Con: O'Brien (3/4) 15', 31', 52'; Pen: O'Brie (3/3) 10', 44', 77'; Cards: Richards (yellow card) 23'; Inisi (yellow card) 32'	Attendance: 2,524; Referee: Luke Pearce (England)
