= 2025–26 EPCR Challenge Cup pool stage =

European Rugby Challenge Cup pool stage

The 2025–26 EPCR Challenge Cup pool stage will be the first stage of the 12th season of the EPCR Challenge Cup.

== Structure ==
The pool stage draw took place on 1 July 2025, with the complete fixture list later announced on 15 July 2025. The fixtures will be played out across four weekends between 5 December 2025 and 18 January 2026.

Teams in the same pool played four of the other five teams in their pool, either at home or away, in the pool stage. The top four teams in each pool progressed to the round of 16 as well as the fifth-ranked team from each Champions Cup pool.

Teams was awarded table points based on match performances; four points for a win, two points for a draw, one bonus point for scoring four or more tries in a match and one bonus point for losing a match by seven points or fewer.

In the event of a tie between two or more teams, the following tie-breakers were used, as directed by European Professional Club Rugby:

1. Where teams have played each other
  1. The club with the greater number of competition points from only matches involving tied teams.
  2. If equal, the club with the best aggregate points difference from those matches.
  3. If equal, the club that scored the most tries in those matches.
2. Where teams remain tied and/or have not played each other in the competition (i.e. are from different pools)
  1. The club with the best aggregate points difference from the pool stage.
  2. If equal, the club that scored the most tries in the pool stage.
  3. If equal, the club with the fewest players suspended in the pool stage.
  4. If equal, the drawing of lots will determine a club's ranking.

== Pools ==
=== Pool 1 ===
EPCR Challenge Cup Pool 1
Pos	Team	Pld	W	D	L	PF	PA	PD	TF	TA	TB	LB	Pts	Qualification
1	(France) Montpellier (1)	4	4	0	0	119	77	+42	18	10	4	0	20	Home round of 16
2	(Italy) Zebre Parma (5)	4	3	0	1	99	81	+18	12	11	2	0	14	Home round of 16
3	(Ireland) Connacht (8)	4	2	0	2	179	71	+108	26	11	3	2	13	Home round of 16
4	(Wales) Ospreys (14)	4	2	0	2	102	97	+5	16	12	3	2	13	Away round of 16
5	(Georgia (country)) Black Lion	4	1	0	3	58	132	−74	8	20	1	0	5	
6	(France) Montauban	4	0	0	4	81	180	−99	11	25	1	1	2	

Source: EPCR
Rules for classification: Tiebreakers for teams tied on points: 1) Number of matches won; 2) Difference between points for and against; 3) Total number of points for; 4) Aggregate number of points scored in matches between tied teams; 5) Number of matches won excluding the first match, then the second and so on until the tie is settled.

==== Round 1 ====
6 December 2025
19:15

Black Lion (Georgia (country))	13–24	(France) Montpellier (1BP)
Try: Tabutsadze 13' c Con: Tsirekidze (1/1) 14'; Pen: Tsirekidze (2/4) 9', 33'; Cards: Mamamtavrishvili (yellow card) 66'	Report	Try: Uelese 42' m Tolofua 49' c Penalty try 66'; Cadot 72' m Con: Hogg (1/2) 50'

Mikheil Meskhi Stadium, Tbilisi
Attendance: 2,697
Referee: Adam Leal (England)

6 December 2025
21:00

(1 BP) Zebre Parma (Italy)	41–17	(France) Montauban
Try: Faissal 25' c Stavile 28' c Ribaldi 44' c Gesi 57' c Fusco 62' c Con: Roger (5/5) 26', 28', 45', 58', 63'; Pen: Roger(10'); Da Re (1/1) 76'	Report	Try: Ahmed 42' c Pacolo 50' c Con: Bosviel (2/2) 43', 51'; Pen: Bosviel (1/1) 13'

Stadio Sergio Lanfranchi, Parma
Attendance: 1,302
Referee: Ben Connor (Wales)

7 December 2025
15:15

(1 BP) Ospreys (Wales)	24–21	(Ireland) Connacht (1 BP)
Try: Deaves 42' m Cokanasiga 57' c R. Smith 67' c Hopkins 75' m Con: Edwards (3/4) 57', 68'; Cards: Ratti (yellow card) 17'; Phillips (yellow card) 28'	Report	Try: Bealham 11' c Jansen 17' c Aungier 23' c Con: Naughton (3/3) 12', 18', 24'; Cards: Buckley (yellow card) 67'

Dunraven Brewery Field, Bridgend
Attendance: 3,311
Referee: Evan Urruzmendi (France)

==== Round 2 ====
12 December 2025
21:00

(1 BP) Montpellier (France)	31–7	(Italy) Zebre Parma
Try: Moustin 20' m Masibaka (2) 28' m, 66' c Tauleigne 61' c Verhaeghe 71' c Con: Miotti (3/5) 62', 67', 72'	Report	Try: Licata 10' c Con: Montemauri (1/1) 11'

GGL Stadium, Montpellier
Attendance: 7,771
Referee: Peter Martin (Ireland)

13 December 2025
16:15

Montauban (France)	22–33	(Wales) Ospreys (1 BP)
Try: Maurouard 35' m Tuculet 56' c Kanika 80+4' c Con: Fortune (1/2) 56'; Castel (1/1) 80+5'; Pen: Fortune (1/1) 2'; Cards: Tuculet (yellow card) 14'	Report	Try: Moriarty 6' c Morse 16' c Giles 24' m Daniel 60' c Hardy 71' c Con: Walsh (4/5) 6', 17', 61', 72'; Cards: Conbeer (yellow card) 54'

Stade Sapiac, Montauban
Attendance: 5,000
Referee: Adam Leal (England)

13 December 2025
20:00

(1 BP) Connacht (Ireland)	52–0	(Georgia (country)) Black Lion
Try: Boyle (3) 1' c, 9' c, 29' c Blade (2) 17' m, 54' c Illo 33' m Bolton (2) 40' c, 67' c Con: Gilbert (6/8) 2', 9', 29', 41', 54', 68'	Report	Cards: Aptsiauri (yellow card) 6' to 16'

Dexcom Stadium, Galway
Attendance: 3,928
Referee: Anthony Woodthorpe (England)

==== Round 3 ====
10 January 2026
14:00

(2 BP) Montauban (France)	28–31	(Georgia (country)) Black Lion (1 BP)
Try: Reilhac 21' c da Costa 56' c Wilkins 64' c Bosviel 76' c Con: Bosviel (4/4) 22', 56', 65', 76'; Cards: Viiga (yellow card) 36'	Report	Try: Tsirekidze (2) 6' m, 43' c Tabutsadze 26' m Sinauridze 40' c Con: Tsirekidze (2/4) 41', 44'; Pen: Tapladze (yellow card) 56'

Stade Sapiac, Montauban
Attendance: 4,150
Referee: Filippo Russo (Italy)

11 January 2026
14:00

(1 BP) Montpellier (France)	33–31	(Ireland) Connacht (2 BP)
Try: Darmon 7' c Akrab 17' c Rates 65' c Bernadet 68' m Welsch 74' c Con: Coly (2/2) 8', 18'; Hogg (2/3) 66', 75'	Report	Try: Murphy 10' c Tierney-Martin 21' c Treacy 33' c Gilbert 46' c Con: Gilbert (4/4) 11', 22', 34', 47'; Pen: Gilbert (1/1) 41'

GGL Stadium, Montpellier
Attendance: 8,648
Referee: Morné Ferreira (South Africa)

11 January 2026
14:00

Zebre Parma (Italy)	23–19	(Wales) Ospreys (1 BP)
Try: Fusco 21' c Locatelli 73' c Con: da Re (2/2) 23', 74'; Pen: da Re (3/3) 16', 27', 58'	Report	Try: Morse 44' c K. Williams 54' c Con: Edwards (2/3) 45', 55'

Stadio Sergio Lanfranchi, Parma
Attendance: 2,000
Referee: Griffin Colby (South Africa)

==== Round 4 ====
17 January 2026
17:00

Black Lion (Georgia (country))	14–28	(Italy) Zebre Parma (1 BP)
Try: Kvatadze (2) 2' c, 40' c Con: Tsirekidze (2/2) 3', 40+1'; Cards: Kakovin (yellow card) 32'	Report	Try: Pitinari 16' c Hasa 32' c Pani 63' c da Re 79' c Con: da Re (4/4) 17', 33', 64', 80'; Cards: Canali (yellow card) 39'; Locatelli (yellow card) 57'

Avchala Rugby Stadium, Tbilisi
Attendance: 2,123
Referee: Evan Urruzmendi (France)

17 January 2026
20:00

(1 BP) Connacht (Ireland)	75–14	(France) Montauban
Try: Boyle (2) 7' c, 40' c Prendergast (2) 19' c, 34' c Gilbert 25' c Penalty try 29'; West 31' c Devine 35' c Jansen 44' m Jennings 65' c Tierney-Martin 80' c Con: Gilbert (7/7) 8', 19', 25', 32', 35', 36', 41'; Naughton (2/2) 66', 80+1'; Cards: Aungier (yellow card) 73'	Report	Try: Seux 21' c Vallée 73' c Con: Bosviel (1/1) 22'; Fortunel (1/1) 73'; Cards: Greyling (red card) 28'; Asaeli (yellow card) 29'; Pomponio (yellow card) 64'

Dexcom Stadium, Galway
Attendance: 3,928
Referee: Ben Connor (Wales)

17 January 2026
20:00

(2 BP) Ospreys (Wales)	26–31	(France) Montpellier (1 BP)
Try: Watkin 11' c Lloyd (2) 40' c, 52' c Moriarty 58' m Con: Walsh (3/4) 12', 40+1', 53'	Report	Try: Masibaka (2) 6' c, 35' c Ducros 21' c Hounkpatin 66' c Con: Hogg (4/4) 6', 22, 36', 67'; Pen: Coly (1/1) 80+1'

Dunraven Brewery Field, Bridgend
Attendance: 4,131
Referee: Federico Vedovelli (Italy)

=== Pool 2 ===
EPCR Challenge Cup Pool 2
Pos	Team	Pld	W	D	L	PF	PA	PD	TF	TA	TB	LB	Pts	Qualification
1	(Italy) Benetton (2)	4	4	0	0	182	89	+93	24	11	3	0	19	Home round of 16
2	(England) Newcastle Red Bulls (6)	4	3	0	1	75	78	−3	11	11	1	0	13	Home round of 16
3	(Wales) Dragons (13)	4	2	0	2	96	148	−52	14	21	1	0	9	Away round of 16
4	(France) Perpignan (16)	4	1	1	2	111	107	+4	14	14	1	1	8	Away round of 16
5	(South Africa) Lions	4	1	1	2	90	93	−3	11	12	1	1	8	
6	(France) Lyon	4	0	0	4	87	126	−39	13	17	1	2	3	

Source: EPCR
Rules for classification: Tiebreakers for teams tied on points: 1) Number of matches won; 2) Difference between points for and against; 3) Total number of points for; 4) Aggregate number of points scored in matches between tied teams; 5) Number of matches won excluding the first match, then the second and so on until the tie is settled.

==== Round 1 ====
6 December 2025
15:00

Lions (South Africa)	18–26	(Italy) Benetton
Try: Mpeku 37' c Venter 45' m Con: C. Smith (1/2) 38'; Pen: C. Smith (2/3) 9', 57'; Cards: Mpeku (yellow card) 66'	Report	Try: Smith 6' m Marin (2) 71' c, 75' m Con: Albornoz (1/2) 72'; Pen: Umaga (1/2) 13'; Albornoz (1/1) 60'; Drop: Albornoz (1/1) 79'

Ellis Park Stadium, Johannesburg
Attendance: 4,120
Referee: Kevin Bralley (France)

6 December 2025
18:30

Lyon (France)	14–23	(England) Newcastle Red Bulls
Try: Mathiron 15' c Shvangiradze 45' c Con: Jackson (2/2) 16', 45'	Report	Try: Obatoyinbo 8' c Christie 71' m Spencer 76' m Con: Connon (1/3) 9'; Pen: Conno (2/2) 27', 40'; Cards: Mafi (yellow card) 59'

Mahmut Stadium, Lyon
Attendance: 12,065
Referee: Morné Ferreira (South Africa)

7 December 2025
14:00

(1 BP) Perpignan (France)	41–17	(Wales) Dragons
Try: Hall 12' c Diaby 28' c Joseph 50' m Chinarro 59' m Le Corvec 76' c Con: Kretchmann (2/4) 13', 29'; Aprasidze (1/1) 77'; Pen: Kretchmann (1/2) 45'; Cards: Carter (yellow card) 71'	Report	Try: Westwood 55' c Austin (2) 64' m, 82' m Con: O'Brien (1/3) 55'; Cards: Paia'aua (red card) 15'

Stade Aime Giral, Perpignan
Attendance: 6,215
Referee: Federico Vedovelli (Italy)

==== Round 2 ====
13 December 2025
14:00

(1 BP) Benetton (Italy)	44–31	(France) Perpignan
Try: Odogwu (2) 8' c, 24' c Izekor 19' c Bernasconi 49' c Mendy 59' c Con: Albornoz (3/3) 9', 19', 25'; Umaga (2/2) 50', 60'; Pen: Albornoz (1/1) 14'; Umaga (2/2) 67', 78'	Report	Try: Duguivalu 21' c Poulet 34' c Fahy 63' m Con: Reus (2/3) 21', 35'; Pen: Reus (4/5) 3', 16', 46', 53'

Stadio Comunale di Monigo, Benetton
Attendance: 4,151
Referee: Ben Connor (Wales)

13 December 2025
17:30

Newcastle Red Bulls (England)	14–10	(South Africa) Lions (1 BP)
Try: Hearle 13' c McCallum 79' c Con: Chamberlain (1/1) 14'; Connon (1/1) 80'; Cards: Fletcher (yellow card) 38' to 48'	Report	Try: Davids 4' c Con: Francis (1/1) 4'; Pen: Francis (1/1) 20'; Cards: Davids (yellow card) 31'

Kingston Park, Newcastle
Attendance: 4,703
Referee: Benoit Rousselet (France)

14 December 2025
15:15

Dragons (Wales)	23–21	(France) Lyon (1 BP)
Try: Keddie 65' m Burrows 73' m Keddie 78' m Con: O'Brien (1/3) 79'; Pen: O'Brien (2/3) 10', 25'; Cards: J. Rosser (yellow card) 22' de Beer (yellow card) 56'	Report	Try: Roux 31' c Mathiron 43' c Maalo 56' c Con: Cassang (2/2) 32', 44'; Gonzalez (1/1) 57'; Cards: Maraku (yellow card) 72'

Rodney Parade, Newport
Attendance: 4,028
Referee: Filippo Russo (Italy)

==== Round 3 ====
10 January 2026
13:00

(1 BP) Newcastle Red Bulls (England)	26–19	(France) Perpignan (1 BP)
Try: Wade 18' c Arnold 21' c Obatoyinbo 44' m McGuigan 58' c Con: Grayson (3/4) 19', 22', 58'; Cards: Grayson (yellow card) 31'	Report	Try: Yato 11' m Granell (2) 32' c, 64' c Con: Reus (2/3) 33', 65'; Cards: Petaia (yellow card) 57'

Kingston Park, Newcastle
Attendance: 6,274
Referee: Peter Martin (Ireland)

10 January 2026
17:15

(1 BP) Lions (South Africa)	42–33	(France) Lyon (1 BP)
Try: Hlekani 6' c Kriel 17' c Horn 23' c du Plessis 36' c Davids 45' c Brandon 78' c Con: Smith (6/6) 7', 18', 24', 37', 46', 79'	Report	Try: Mignot 14' c Tchaptchet 39' c Gonzalez 41' m Sarragallet 53' c Parisien 74' c Con: Jackson (4/5) 15', 40', 54', 74'; Cards: Kaabeche (yellow card) 28'

Ellis Park Stadium, Johannesburg
Attendance: 2,542
Referee: Anthony Woodthorpe (England)

10 January 2026
18:30

(1 BP) Benetton (Italy)	74–21	(Wales) Dragons
Try: Izekor 14' c Ratave 18' c Fekitoa 33' m Odogwu (2) 37' m, 55' c Umaga (2) 40' c, 64' c Lynagh (2) 51' m, 67' c Marin (2) 75' c, 80+2' c Con: Umaga (8/11) 15', 19', 41', 56', 65', 68', 75', 80+3'; Pen: Umaga (1/1) 3'	Report	Try: Burrows 29' c Dyer 58' c Lewis-Hughes 78' c Con: de Beer (2/2) 30', 59'; J. Lloyd (1/1) 78'

Stadio Comunale di Monigo, Benetton
Attendance: 3,754
Referee: Benoit Rousselet (France)

==== Round 4 ====
16 January 2026
20:00

(1 BP) Dragons (Wales)	35–12	(England) Newcastle Red Bulls
Try: Dyer (2) 30’ c, 53' c Coghlan 47’ c Penalty try 68'; Richards 78’ c Con: O'Brien (4/4) 31', 48', 54', 79'	Report	Try: Benitez Cruz 34'; Wade 36'; Con: Grayson (1/2) 37'; Cards: Hodgson (yellow card) 46'; Gordon (yellow card) 67'; Parsons (yellow card) 68'

Rodney Parade, Newport
Attendance: 5,296
Referee: Christopher Allison (South Africa)

17 January 2026
18:30

Perpignan (France)	20–20	(South Africa) Lions
Try: Oviedo 28' c Duguivalu 67' c Con: Aucagne (2/2) 29', 68'; Pen: Aucagne (2/3) 3', 72'; Cards: Ruiz (yellow card) 21'	Report	Try: Penalty try 21'; Botha 63' c Con: Smith (1/1) 64'; Pen: Smith (2/2) 24', 56'

Stade Aime Giral, Perpignan
Attendance: 9,845
Referee: Filippo Russo (Italy)

18 January 2026
14:00

Lyon (France)	19–38	(Italy) Benetton (1 BP)
Try: Parisien (2) 3' c, 7' c Cretin 58' m Con: Jackson (2/2) 4', 8'	Report	Try: Maile (2) 20' c, 39' c Fekitoa 29' c Ratave 35' c Spagnolo 62' c Con: Smith (5/5) 21', 30', 36', 40', 63'; Pen: Smith (1/1) 10'

Mahmut Stadium, Lyon
Attendance: 14,659
Referee: Sara Cox (England)

=== Pool 3 ===
EPCR Challenge Cup Pool 3
Pos	Team	Pld	W	D	L	PF	PA	PD	TF	TA	TB	LB	Pts	Qualification
1	(Ireland) Ulster (3)	4	3	0	1	141	55	+86	21	8	4	1	17	Home round of 16
2	(France) Stade Français (4)	4	3	0	1	129	90	+39	19	13	3	1	16	Home round of 16
3	(England) Exeter Chiefs (7)	4	2	1	1	129	70	+59	18	11	3	1	14	Home round of 16
4	(Wales) Cardiff (15)	4	2	0	2	78	108	−30	11	17	2	0	10	Away round of 16
5	(France) Racing 92	4	1	1	2	82	152	−70	13	21	2	0	8	
6	(South Africa) Cheetahs	4	0	0	4	62	146	−84	9	21	1	1	2	

Source: EPCR
Rules for classification: Tiebreakers for teams tied on points: 1) Number of matches won; 2) Difference between points for and against; 3) Total number of points for; 4) Aggregate number of points scored in matches between tied teams; 5) Number of matches won excluding the first match, then the second and so on until the tie is settled.

==== Round 1 ====
5 December 2025
20:00

(1 BP) Ulster (Ireland)	61–7	(France) Racing 92
Try: Stockdale (2) 15' c, 79' c Herring 35' c O'Toole 42' m Stewart 48' c Wilson 59' c Flannery 68' c Z. Ward (2) 73' c, 80+3' c Con: Murphy (8/9) 16', 36', 49', 59', 68', 74', 80', 83'	Report	Try: Gibert 8' c Con: Gibert (1/1) 9'; Cards: Sanconnie (yellow card) 50'

Affidea Stadium, Belfast
Attendance: 10,426
Referee: Ben Breakspear (Wales)

6 December 2025
14:00

(1 BP) Stade Français (France)	38–17	(Wales) Cardiff
Try: Ibo (2) 17' m, 50' m Halaifonua 42' c Sclezo 61' c Foursans-Bourdette 66' c Laloi 76' c Con: Foursans-Bourdette (4/6) 42', 62', 67', 77'	Report	Try: Stephens 24' m Young 34' m Sebastian 79' c Con: Wilde (2/3) 80'

Stade Jean Bouin, Paris
Attendance: 10,643
Referee: Peter Martin (Ireland)

7 December 2025
17:30

(1 BP) Exeter Chiefs (England)	42–12	(South Africa) Cheetahs
Try: Ikitau 5' c Fisilau 20' c Skinner 31' c Sio 37' c Slade 41' c Feyi-Waboso 57' c Con: Slade (6/6) 6', 21', 32', 38', 42', 58'	Report	Try: Annies 24' c Hartzenberg 44' m Con: van der Walt (1/2) 25'

Sandy Park, Exeter
Attendance: 9,048
Referee: Benoit Rousselet (France)

==== Round 2 ====
13 December 2025
14:00

Cheetahs (South Africa)	22–45	(France) Stade Français (1 BP)
Try: van der Westhuizen 33' c Hartzenerg 38' c Nel 81' m Con: Jasper (2/2) 34', 39'; Pen: Jasper 13'	Report	Try: Motassi (2) 7' c, 44' c Marchant 22' c Mapu 42' c Nene 67' c Scelzo 76' c Con: Foursans-Bourdette (6/6) 7', 22', 43', 45', 68', 77'; Pen: Foursans-Bourdette (1/1) 53'

NRCA Stadium, Amsterdam
Attendance: 2,250
Referee: Sara Cox (England)

13 December 2025
20:00

(1 BP) Cardiff (Wales)	29–26	(Ireland) Ulster (2 BP)
Try: Nott 7' c Bowen 13' m Southworth 65' c Thomas 73' c Con: Halfpenny (1/1) 8'; Sheedy (2/2) 65', 74'; Pen: Sheedy (1/1) 80+1'; Cards: Botham (yellow card) 68'	Report	Try: Stewart 22' c Hume 40' c Kok (2) 45' m, 54' c Con: Flannery (3/4) 23', 41', 55'; Cards: Sheridan (yellow card) 68'; Carson (yellow card) 72'

Cardiff Arms Park, Cardiff
Attendance: 6,425
Referee: Evan Urruzmendi (France)

14 December 2025
14:00

(1 BP) Racing 92 (France)	31–31	(England) Exeter Chiefs (1 BP)
Try: Labarbe 8' c Ravutaumada 27' m Taofifénua 64' c Donguy 72' m Latrasse 80+2' c Con: Gibert (1/2) 8'; Prisciantelli (2/3) 65', 80+3'	Report	Try: Moloney 14' c James 20' c Pearson 29' c Tuima 37' c Con: Coen (4/4) 14', 21', 31', 38'; Pen: Coen (1/1) 70'; Cards: Tuima (yellow card) 62'; Fisilau (yellow card) 71'

Stade Dominique Duvauchelle, Créteil
Attendance: 5,591
Referee: Federico Vedovelli (Italy)

==== Round 3 ====
10 January 2026
14:00

(1 BP) Stade Français (France)	27–25	(England) Exeter Chiefs (1 BP)
Try: Melikidze 50' m Motassi 58' c Penalty try 59'; Laloi 67' m Con: Barré (1/3) 59'; Pen: Barré (1/1) 76'	Report	Try: Brown-Bampoe 13' c Sio (2) 42' c, 44' m Con: Slade (2/3) 14', 43'; Pen: Slade (1/1) 33'; Drop: Slade (1/1) 71'; Cards: Fisilau (yellow card) 63'; Pearson (yellow card) 64'

Stade Jean Bouin, Paris
Attendance: 15,165
Referee: Craig Evans (Wales)

10 January 2026
15:15

(1 BP) Cardiff (Wales)	32–13	(France) Racing 92
Try: Bowen 6' c Thornton 40' m Assiratti 45' c Thomas 74' c Con: Sheedy (2/3) 7', 46'; Beetham (1/1) 75'; Pen: Sheedy (2/2) 55', 65'	Report	Try: Ravutaumada 13' m Prisciantelli 31' m Pen: Gibert (1/1) 5'; Cards: Ravutaumada (yellow card) 1'

Cardiff Arms Park, Cardiff
Attendance: 8,400
Referee: Sara Cox (England)

11 January 2026
16:15

Cheetahs (South Africa)	0–28	(Ireland) Ulster (1 BP)

Dukes Rugby, 's-Hertogenbosch
Attendance: 0
Referee: Kevin Bralley (France)

- The game was initially set to be played at NRCA Stadium, but was moved to Dukes Rugby due to adverse weather conditions making the pitch unplayable. However, on inspection of Dukes Rugby ahead of the game, the match was postponed due to an unplayable pitch. The match was later cancelled by EPCR and a 28-0 victory awarded to Ulster.

==== Round 4 ====
17 January 2026
13:00

(1 BP) Ulster (Ireland)	26–19	(France) Stade Français (1 BP)
Try: O'Toole 1’ c Baloucoune 14’ m McCloskey 23’ c Doak 30’ c Con: Murphy (3/4) 2', 24', 31'	Report	Try: Melikidze 46' c Laloi 54' m Peyresblanques 66' c Con: Foursans-Bourdette (2/3) 47', 67'

Affidea Stadium, Belfast
Attendance: 11,900
Referee: Adam Leal (England)

18 January 2026
13:00

(1 BP) Exeter Chiefs (England)	31–0	(Wales) Cardiff
Try: Tchumbadze (2) 5' c, 19' c Dweba 23' m Heaven 66' c Brown-Bampoe 77' m Con: Slade (3/4) 6', 20', 67'	Report	Cards: Thornton (yellow card) 18'

Sandy Park, Exeter
Attendance: 8,756
Referee: Griffin Colby (South Africa)

18 January 2026
18:30

(1 BP) Racing 92 (France)	31–28	(South Africa) Cheetahs (2 BP)
Try: Albuisson 8' c Dayimani 18' c Donguy 41' m Hill 51' m Fickou 78' c Con: Gibert (3/5) 8', 18', 80'; Cards: Taofifenua (yellow card) 24'; Lainault (yellow card) 29'	Report	Try: Maartens 1' c Penalty try 24'; Nkabinde 34' c du Plessis 69' c Con: van der Walt (3/3) 2', 35', 80'; Cards: Coetzee (yellow card) 15'

La Défense Arena, Nanterre
Attendance: 5,697
Referee: Ben Breakspear (Wales)
