= 2025–26 Edinburgh Rugby season =

Edinburgh Rugby
- 2025–26 season
- Head coach: Sean Everitt
- Managing director: Douglas Struth
- United Rugby Championship: 12th
- Champions Cup: Round of 16
- Highest home attendance: 38,179 v Glasgow (URC Rd 8)
- Lowest home attendance: 6,502 v Ospreys (URC Rd 6)
- Average home attendance: 9,959

The 2025–26 season is Edinburgh's fifth season in the United Rugby Championship, their 32nd season of professional rugby. Along with competing in the URC and its Scottish–Italian Shield competition, the club will also participate in the 2025–26 European Rugby Champions Cup and the 1872 Cup.

== United Rugby Championship ==
=== Matches ===
27 September 2025	(1 BP) Zebre Parma (Italy)	31 – 28	(Scotland) Edinburgh (2 BP)	Stadio Sergio Lanfranchi, Parma
15:05	Try: D Bartolomeo (3'); Pitinari (12'); Gesi (34'); Fusco (44'); Con: Da Re(4', 13', 35', 45'); Pen: Roger (79')		Try: McConnell (17'); Bradbury (23'); Velacott (50'); Harrison (75'); Con: Healy (18', 24', 51', 76'); Cards: Licata (red card) 15'; Pitinari (yellow card) 74'	Attendance: 2 276; Referee: Ben Whitehouse

10 October 2025	(1 BP) Munster (Ireland)	20–19	(Scotland) Edinburgh (1 BP)	Musgrave Park, Cork
19:45	Try: A. Smith (2'); Milne (33', 58'); F. Wycherley (72')	report	Try: Ashman (7'); Vellacott (15'); Graham (48'); Con: Healy (16', 49'); Cards: Young (yellow card) 28'; Rae (yellow card) 30'; Douglas (yellow card) 53'; Graham (yellow card) 68'	Attendance: 8,800; Referee: Ben Whitehouse (Wales)

17 October 2025	(1 BP) Edinburgh (Scotland)	43 – 0	(Italy) Benetton	Edinburgh Rugby Stadium
19:45	Try: van der Merwe (5'); Richardson (11', 57'); Graham (39', 78'); O'Conor (65'); Bradbury (73'); Con: Scott (6', 11', 40'); Thompson (66')	Report	Cards: Fekitoa (yellow card) 44'; Garbisi (yellow card) 57'	Attendance: 6,763

25 October 2025	Cardiff (Wales)	20 – 19	(Scotland) Edinburgh (1 BP)	Cardiff Arms Park
19:45	Try: Mulder (7' m); Adams (15' c); Sebastian (43' m); Con: Lloyd (16'); Pen: Lloyd (74')		Try: Wells (3' m); Shiel (9' c); Ashman (19' c); Con: Scott (9'); Lang (20')	Attendance: 7,189

29 November 2025	Edinburgh (Scotland)	19 – 17	(Wales) Ospreys (1 BP)	Edinburgh Rugby Stadium
17:30	Try: Currie (33' m); Morris (54' c); Paterson (71' c); Con: Thompson (1/2) (55'); Scott (1/1) (71')	Report	Try: Davies (25' m); Cokanasiga (45' m); Boshoff (75' c); Con: Walsh (76')	Attendance: 6,502; Referee: Peter Martin (Ireland)

20 December 2025	(1 BP) Glasgow Warriors (Scotland)	24 – 12	(Scotland) Edinburgh	Hampden Park, Glasgow
15:00	Try: Fagerson 10' c Darge 51' c Hiddleston 55' m Stephen 77' m Con: Hastngs (2) 11', 51'	Report	Try: Richardson 28' m Gilchrist 72' c Con: Thompson 72'; Cards: Hunter-Hill (yellow card) 77'	Attendance: 21,093; Referee: Eoghan Cross (IRFU)

27 December 2025	Edinburgh (Scotland)	3 - 21	(Scotland) Glasgow Warriors	Murrayfield Stadium, Edinburgh
15:00	Pen: Scott 6'	Report	Try: Dobie (2) 32' c, 79' c Horne 76' c Con: Adam Hastings 33'; Horne 77'; Lancaster 80'; Cards: Fraser (yellow card) 21'	Attendance: 38,179; Referee: Hollie Davidson (SRU)

3 January 2026	(1 BP) Benetton (Italy)	14 – 15	(Scotland) Edinburgh	Stadio Comunale di Monigo, Treviso
17:30	Try: Gallo 52' c Fekitoa 57' c Con: Umaga (2/2) 53', 58'	Report	Try: Vellacott 21' c Graham 48' m Con: Thompson (1/2) 22'; Pen: Thompson 29'	Attendance: 4,857; Referee: Peter Martin (Ireland)

23 January 2026	(1 BP) Edinburgh (Scotland)	17 - 19	(South Africa) Bulls	Edinburgh Rugby Stadium
19:45	Try: v.d. Merwe 6' m Schoeman 17' m Rae 34' c Con: Thompson (1/3) 25'	Report	Try: Coetzee 12' m Grobbelaar 44' c van Staden 70' c Con: Pollard (2/3) 45', 71'	Attendance: 6,648; Referee: Gnecchi

31 January 2026	(1 BP) Leinster (Ireland)	28 – 20	(Scotland) Edinburgh	Aviva Stadium, Dublin
17:30	Try: Deegan 13' c Penny (3) 44' c, 68' c, 74' c Con: Tector (4/4) 14', 45', 69', 75'	Report	Try: v.d. Merwe 20' m Satala 39' c Shiel 80+1' m Con: Thompson 40'; Pen: Thompson 23'; Cards: Hunter-Hill (yellow card) 10'	Attendance: 18,505

27 February 2026	(1 BP) Edinburgh (Scotland)	24 – 19	(Wales) Scarlets (1 BP)	Edinburgh Rugby Stadium
19:45	Try: Vellacott (2) 30' c, 49' m Bradbury 46' c Paterson 69' m Con: Thompson (2) 31', 47'; Cards: Paterson (yellow card) 56'	Report	Try: Roberts (2) 22' c, 62' m Lousi, 28' c Con: Leggatt-Jones (2) 23', 28'	Attendance: 6,657; Referee: Peter Martin (IRFU)

13 March 2026	Edinburgh (Scotland)	19 – 40	(Ireland) Ulster (1 BP)	Edinburgh Rugby Stadium
19:45	Try: Thompson 6' c Paterson 21' c Goosen 31' m Con: Thompson (2/3) 6', 22'; Cards: Morris (red card)	Report	Try: Irvine 10' c Augustus 35' c Flannery 50' m Wilson 62' c McKee 69' c Carson 74' c Con: Murphy (5/6) 11', 35', 63', 70', 75'; Cards: Sheridan (red card); Z Ward (yellow card) 1'	Attendance: 7,989; Referee: Federico Vedovelli (Italy)

21 March 2026	(1 BP) Lions (South Africa)	54 – 17	(Scotland) Edinburgh	Ellis Park Stadium, Johannesburg
12:45	Try: Venter 6' c F. Horn 19'c Landsberg 21' c van den Berg 26' c Mills 44' c Davids (2) 54' c, 67' c Pead 79' m Con: CW Smith (7/7) 7', 20', 22', 27', 45', 55', 69'; Mills (0/1); Cards: F. Horn (yellow card) 39'	Report	Try: Ashman 49' m Douglas 62' m Currie 72' c Con: Scott (1/3) 72'	Attendance: 3,464; Referee: Gianluca Gnecci, (Italy)

28 March 2026	(1 BP) Stormers (South Africa)	33 – 14	(Scotland) Edinburgh	Cape Town Stadium
17:00	Try: Roos (2) 25' c, 68' c Zas 49' m Mchunu 63' c Fourie 80' c Con: Feinberg-Mngomezulu (4/5) 25', 63', 69', 81'	Report	Try: Lang 34' c Venter 58' c Con: Thompson (2) 35', 59'	Attendance: 21,487; Referee: Gianluca Gnecchi (Italy)

17 April 2026	(1BP) Edinburgh (Scotland)	31 – 30	(Italy) Zebre Parma (2 BP)	Edinburgh Rugby Stadium
19:45	Try: Boyle 5' c Patterson 19' c Ashman (2) 36' m, 61' m Venter 79' c Con: Thompson (2) 6', 20'; Scott 80'	Report	Try: Fusco 10' c Gesi 14' m Trulla 46' m Nocera 73' c Con: Montemauri (2/4) 11', 74'; Pen: Montemauri (2) 41', 67'	Attendance: 6,818; Referee: Christopher Allison (South Africa)

24 April 2026	(1 BP) Edinburgh (Scotland)	33 – 28	(South Africa) Sharks (2 BP)	Edinburgh Rugby Stadium
19:45	Try: Ashman 15' c Young 33' c Tuipulotu 60' m Patterson 63' c Graham 69' c Con: Scott (2/2) 16', 34'; Thompson (2/3) 64', 70'	Report	Try: v.d. Merwe 6' c M Tshituka 20' c Koch 56' c V Tshituka 80' c Con: J Smith (4/4) 7', 20', 57', 81'	Attendance: 7,774; Referee: Ben Breakspear (Wales)

9 May 2026	Dragons (Wales)	15 – 24	(Scotland) Edinburgh (1 BP)	Rodney Parade, Newport
19:45	Try: Lewis 28' c Keddie 44' m Con: O'Brien (1/2) 29'; Pen: O'Brien 8'	Report	Try: Ashman 18' c Currie 40' c v.d. Merwe (2) 49' m, 74' m Con: Thompson (2/4) 19', 41'; Cards: Richardson (yellow card) 52'; Venter (yellow card) 66'	Attendance: 7,079; Referee: Filippo Russo (Italy)

15 May 2026	Edinburgh (Scotland)	5 – 26	(Ireland) Connacht (1 BP)	Edinburgh Rugby Stadium
19:45	Try: Ashman 72'	Report	Try: Ioane 24' m Hurley-Langton (2) 36' c, 43' c Devine 60' c Con: Gilbert (3/4) 36', 44', 61'	Attendance: 7,778; Referee: Aimee Barrett-Theron (South Africa)

=== Table ===
Pos	Team	Pld	W	D	L	PF	PA	PD	TF	TA	TB	LB	Pts	Qualification
1	Glasgow Warriors	18	13	0	5	479	338	+141	72	48	11	2	65	Qualification for the Champions Cup and knockout stage
2	Leinster	18	12	0	6	515	370	+145	77	51	13	2	63	Qualification for the Champions Cup and knockout stage
3	Stormers	18	12	1	5	504	344	+160	63	48	9	1	60	Qualification for the Champions Cup and knockout stage
4	Bulls	18	12	0	6	576	406	+170	82	59	10	1	59	Qualification for the Champions Cup and knockout stage
5	Munster	18	11	0	7	396	376	+20	59	51	8	3	55	Qualification for the Champions Cup and knockout stage
6	Cardiff	18	11	0	7	353	372	−19	52	52	7	4	55	Qualification for the Champions Cup and knockout stage
7	Lions	18	10	1	7	532	473	+59	73	70	9	3	54	Qualification for the Champions Cup and knockout stage
8	Connacht	18	10	0	8	442	395	+47	62	56	10	4	54	Qualification for the Champions Cup and knockout stage
9	Ulster	18	9	1	8	494	420	+74	72	60	10	4	52	Qualification for the Challenge Cup
10	Sharks	18	8	1	9	467	428	+39	71	57	9	3	46	Qualification for the Challenge Cup
11	Ospreys	18	7	2	9	376	454	−78	55	69	4	3	39	Qualification for the Challenge Cup
12	Edinburgh	18	7	0	11	362	439	−77	57	66	6	4	38	Qualification for the Challenge Cup
13	Benetton	18	6	2	10	327	493	−166	41	71	4	1	33	Qualification for the Challenge Cup
14	Scarlets	18	4	2	12	361	460	−99	52	63	3	5	28	Qualification for the Challenge Cup
15	Dragons	18	3	4	11	350	481	−131	46	71	4	4	28	Qualification for the Challenge Cup
16	Zebre Parma	18	2	0	16	312	587	−275	43	85	3	4	15	Qualification for the Challenge Cup

Updated to match(es) played on 16 May 2026. Source: UnitedRugby.com
Rules for classification: Tiebreakers for teams tied on points: 1) Number of matches won 2) The difference between points for and points against 3) The number of tries scored 4) The most points scored 5) The difference between tries for and tries against 6) The fewest red cards received 7) The fewest yellow cards received.

2025–26 United Rugby Championship Regional Shield tables
(Italy) (Scotland) Italian x Scottish Shield
	Team	P	W	D	L	PF	PA	PD	TF	TA	TBP	LBP	Pts	Pos overall
1	(Scotland) Glasgow Warriors	6	5	0	1	163	72	+91	25	9	4	1	25	1
2	(Scotland) Edinburgh	6	3	0	3	132	120	+12	20	17	3	1	16	12
3	(Italy) Benetton	6	3	0	3	98	141	–43	10	19	1	1	14	13
4	(Italy) Zebre Parma	6	1	0	5	130	190	–60	17	26	2	3	9	16
If teams are level at any stage, tiebreakers are applied in the following order: 1. number of matches won 2. the difference between points for and points against 3. the number of tries scored 4. the most points scored 5. the difference between tries for and tries against 6. the fewest red cards received 7. the fewest yellow cards received
Green background indicates teams currently leading the regional shield. Upon the conclusion of the regular season, these teams win their respective regional shields. (S) : URC Shield champion

== European Champions Cup ==
Edinburgh have been drawn in Pool 2 of the European Rugby Champions Cup, along with URC colleagues Munster (whom Edinburgh will not play in line with the rules of the competition), along with Bath, Castres, Gloucester and Toulon.

=== Pool 2 ===
European Rugby Champions Cup Pool 2
Pos	Team	Pld	W	D	L	PF	PA	PD	TF	TA	TB	LB	Pts	Qualification
1	(England) Bath (4)	4	3	0	1	180	89	+91	25	10	4	0	16	Home Champions Cup round of 16
2	(France) Toulon (7)	4	3	0	1	123	106	+17	14	13	2	0	14	Home Champions Cup round of 16
3	(France) Castres (12)	4	2	0	2	98	106	−8	13	15	2	0	10	Away Champions Cup round of 16
4	(Scotland) Edinburgh (14)	4	2	0	2	69	140	−71	9	18	2	0	10	Away Champions Cup round of 16
5	(Ireland) Munster (10CC)	4	1	0	3	99	101	−2	15	13	2	2	8	Away Challenge Cup round of 16
6	(England) Gloucester	4	1	0	3	75	102	−27	8	15	1	1	6	

Source: EPCR
Rules for classification: Tiebreakers for teams tied on points: 1) Number of matches won; 2) Difference between points for and against; 3) Total number of points for; 4) Aggregate number of points scored in matches between tied teams; 5) Number of matches won excluding the first match, then the second and so on until the tie is settled.

7 December 2025	(1 BP) Edinburgh (Scotland)	33–20	(France) Toulon	Edinburgh Rugby Stadium, Edinburgh
17:30	Try: Schoeman 14' c Vellacott 29' m Penalty try 59'; Venter 75' m Con: Scott (1/3) 15'; Pen: Scott (3/3) 10', 34', 54'	Report	Try: White (2) 6' c, 21' c Con: Jaminet (2/2) 7', 22'; Pen: Garcia (1/1) 55'; Drop: Jaminet (1/1) 2'; Cards: Ribbans (yellow card) 56'	Attendance: 7,008; Referee: Matthew Carley (England)

14 December 2025	(1 BP) Castres (France)	33–0	(Scotland) Edinburgh	Stade Pierre-Fabre, Castres
14:00	Try: Ambadiang 12' m Zarantonello 46' c Ardron 53' c Vargas 60' c Botitu 63' c Con: Popelin (4/5) 47', 54', 61', 63'	Report	Cards: O'Conor (yellow card) 56'	Attendance: 10,468; Referee: Andrea Piardi (Italy)

9 January 2026	(1 BP) Edinburgh (Scotland)	26 – 24	(England) Gloucester (1 BP)	Edinburgh Rugby Stadium, Edinburgh
20:00	Try: Vellacott 17' m Ashman 53' c McConnell 61' c penalty try 67 ' Con: Thompson (2) 54', 62'	Report	Try: Hathaway 2' m Atkinson 39' c Con: Barton 40'; Pen: Barton (4) 15', 30', 57', 75'; Cards: Atkinson (yellow card) 68'	Attendance: 7,439; Referee: Luc Ramos (France)

16 January 2026	(1 BP) Bath (England)	63 – 10	(Scotland) Edinburgh	The Rec, Bath
20:00	Try: du Toit 14’ c penalty try 17'; Obano 30’ c Dunn 40’ c Cokanasiga (2) 56’ cm 70' c Spencer 60’ c Arundell 67’ c Ojomoh 73’ c Con: Russell (8/8) 15', 39', 40+1', 57', 61', 68', 71'. 74'	Report	Try: O'Conor 35' c Con: Thompson 36'; Pen: Thompson 2'	Attendance: 14,509; Referee: Gianluca Gnecchi (Italy)

=== Knockout stage ===
Edinburgh qualified for the round of 16 as the fourteenth seed. They will travel to Dublin to face third seed Leinster on 5 April 2026.

Round of 16
1	(France) Bordeaux Bègles	64
16	(England) Leicester Tigers	14
8	(France) Toulouse	59
9	(England) Bristol Bears	26
4	(England) Bath	31
13	(England) Saracens	22
5	(England) Northampton Saints	49
12	(France) Castres	41
2	(Scotland) Glasgow Warriors	25
15	(South Africa) Bulls	21
7	(France) Toulon	28
10	(South Africa) Stormers	27
3	(Ireland) Leinster	49
14	(Scotland) Edinburgh	31
6	(England) Harlequins	17
11	(England) Sale Sharks	26

Quarter-finals
1	(France) Bordeaux Bègles	30
8	(France) Toulouse	15
4	(England) Bath	43
5	(England) Northampton Saints	41
2	(Scotland) Glasgow Warriors	19
7	(France) Toulon	22
3	(Ireland) Leinster	43
11	(England) Sale Sharks	13

Semi-finals
1	(France) Bordeaux Bègles	38
4	(England) Bath	26
3	(Ireland) Leinster	29
7	(France) Toulon	25

Final
1	(France) Bordeaux Bègles	41
3	(Ireland) Leinster	19

Round of 16

5 April 2026	Leinster (Ireland) (3)	49–31	(14) (Scotland) Edinburgh	Aviva Stadium, Dublin
17:30	Try: T. O'Brien (2) 1' c, 8' c J. O'Brien 24' c Keenan 36' c van der Flier 55' c Clarkson 62' c Ioane 64' c Con: Byrne (7/7) 2', 9', 25', 37', 56', 63', 65'	Report	Try: Shiel 15' m Thompson (2) 19' c, 27' c Currie 39' c Graham 51' m Con: Thompson (3/5) 20', 27', 40'	Attendance: 21,491; Referee: Luke Pearce (England)
