= 2025–26 EPCR Challenge Cup =

Rugby union competition

Tournament details
- Countries: England; France; Georgia; Ireland; Italy; South Africa; Wales

Tournament statistics
- Teams: 18 (plus 4 from Champions Cup pool stage)
- Matches played: 50
- Attendance: 353,247 (7,065 per match)
- Highest attendance: 43,205 – Montpellier Herault v Ulster; 22 May 2026
- Lowest attendance: 1,302 – Zebre Parma v US Montauban; 6 December 2025
- Tries scored: 382 (7.64 per match)
- Top point scorer(s): (Samoa) Jacob Umaga (Benetton); 86 points
- Top try scorer(s): (Samoa) Jacob Umaga (Benetton); 6 tries

Final
- Venue: San Mamés Stadium, Bilbao
- Champions: (France) Montpellier (3rd title)
- Runners-up: (Ireland) Ulster

The 2025–26 EPCR Challenge Cup, often known as the 2025-26 European Challenge Cup, was the twelfth edition of the EPCR Challenge Cup, an annual second-tier rugby union competition for professional clubs competing in elite European competition. Including the predecessor competition, the original European Challenge Cup, this was 30th edition of European club rugby's second-tier competition. The holders were Bath who qualified for the 2025-26 European Rugby Champions Cup.

The final was played at in San Mamés Stadium, Bilbao. The Challenge Cup final, like the Champions Cup final, will feature an Ireland versus France clash as Ulster face Montpellier Hérault. Montpellier won their third Challenge Cup, defeating Ulster by 59 points to 26.

== Teams ==
Sixteen teams qualified for the 2025–26 EPCR Challenge Cup from Premiership Rugby, the Top 14 and the United Rugby Championship as a direct result of their domestic league performance having not qualified for the Champions Cup. Two further sides received invitations, South Africa's Cheetahs and Georgia's Black Lion.

The distribution of teams are:

- England: two teams
  - Teams in the 2025–26 Premiership season that did not qualify for the 2025–26 Champions Cup.
- France: six teams
  - Teams taking part in the 2025–26 Top 14 season that did not qualify for the 2025–26 Champions Cup.
- Georgia: one team
  - one team, invited, Black Lion
- Ireland, Italy, South Africa and Wales: eight teams
  - Eight teams in the 2025–26 United Rugby Championship season that did not qualify for the 2025–26 Champions Cup. This season, these consist of three teams from Wales (Cardiff, Dragons, and Ospreys), two from Ireland (Ulster Rugby and Connacht Rugby), two from Italy (Benetton and Zebre Parma), and one from South Africa (Lions). No Scottish team enters at the pool stage.
- South Africa: one further team
  - One team, invited, the South African team, Cheetahs, playing their home games in the Netherlands.

At the knockout stage, a further four teams will enter the competition from the 2025-26 European Rugby Champions Cup:

- Ireland, one team
  - Munster
- South Africa, one team
  - Sharks
- France, two teams
  - La Rochelle
  - Pau

Entry Point	Premiership	Top 14	United Rugby Championship				Invited	
—N/a	England	France	Ireland	Italy	Wales	South Africa		(Georgia (country)) Georgia
Pool stage	Exeter Chiefs; Newcastle Red Bulls	Stade Français; Lyon; Montpellier; Racing 92; Perpignan; Montauban	Connacht; Ulster	Benetton Rugby; Zebre Parma	Cardiff; Dragons; Ospreys	Lions	Cheetahs	Black Lion
Knockout stage		Pau; La Rochelle	Munster			Sharks		

=== Team details ===
Team	Coach / Director of Rugby	Captain	Stadium	Capacity	Method of qualification
Entering at Pool stage
(Italy) Benetton	(Scotland) Calum MacRae	(Italy) Michele Lamaro	Stadio Comunale di Monigo	5,000	URC bottom eight (10th)
(Georgia (country)) Black Lion	(Italy) Marco Bortolami (interim) (for (England) Richard Cockerill) (Note: Bortolami replaced Cockerill on 5 January after Cockerill was sacked after the second round of the competition.)	(Georgia (country)) Mikheil Babunashvili	Mikheil Meskhi Stadium; Avchala Rugby Stadium	27,223; 3,200	Invited
(Wales) Cardiff	(England) Matt Sherratt	(Wales) Liam Belcher	Cardiff Arms Park	12,125	URC bottom eight (9th)
(South Africa) Cheetahs	(South Africa) François Steyn	(Namibia) Louis van der Westhuizen	NRCA Stadium	5,000	Invited
(Ireland) Connacht	(England) Stuart Lancaster	(Ireland) Cian Prendergast	Dexcom Stadium	12,500	URC bottom eight (13th)
(Wales) Dragons	(New Zealand) Filo Tiatia	(Wales) Ben Carter	Rodney Parade	8,700	URC bottom eight (16th)
(England) Exeter Chiefs	(England) Rob Baxter	(Wales) Dafydd Jenkins	Sandy Park	15,600	Premiership bottom two (9th)
(South Africa) Lions	(South Africa) Ivan van Rooyen	(South Africa) Francke Horn	Emirates Airline Park	62,567	URC bottom eight (11th)
(France) Lyon	(France) Karim Ghezal	(France) Baptiste Couilloud	Mahmut Stadium	25,000	Top 14 bottom six (11th)
(France) Montauban	(France) Sébastien Tillous-Borde	(Spain) Fred Quercy	Stade Sapiac	9,210	Pro D2 Champions
(France) Montpellier	(France) Joan Caudullo	(France) Lenni Nouchi	GGL Stadium	15,697	Top 14 bottom six (9th)
(England) Newcastle Red Bulls	(England) Steve Diamond	(England) George McGuigan	Kingston Park	11,200	Premiership bottom two (10th)
(Wales) Ospreys	(Wales) Mark Jones	(Wales) Jac Morgan	Dunraven Brewery Field	8,000	URC bottom eight (12th)
(France) Perpignan	(France) Mathieu Cidre	(Scotland) Jamie Ritchie	Stade Aimé Giral	14,593	Top 14 bottom six (13th)
(France) Racing 92	(France) Patrice Collazo	(France) Romain Taofifénua	Paris La Défense Arena; Stade Dominique Duvauchelle	30,680; 12,150	Top 14 bottom six (10th)
(France) Stade Français	(England) Paul Gustard	(France) Paul Gabrillagues	Stade Jean-Bouin	20,000	Top 14 bottom six (12th)
(Ireland) Ulster	(Ireland) Richie Murphy	(Ireland) Iain Henderson	Affidea Stadium	18,196	URC bottom eight (14th)
(Italy) Zebre Parma	(Italy) Massimo Brunello	(Italy) Giovanni Licata	Stadio Sergio Lanfranchi	5,000	URC bottom eight (15th)
Entering at Knockout Stage (transferred from Champions Cup)
(France) La Rochelle	(Ireland) Ronan O'Gara	(France) Grégory Alldritt	Stade Marcel-Deflandre	18,000	Champions Cup Pool 3 5th place
(Ireland) Munster	(New Zealand) Clayton McMillan	(Ireland) Tadhg Beirne	Thomond Park, Limerick; Páirc Uí Chaoimh, Cork	25,600; 45,000	Champions Cup Pool 2 5th place
(South Africa) Sharks	(South Africa) JP Pietersen	(South Africa) André Esterhuizen	Kings Park Stadium	52,000	Champions Cup Pool 1 5th place
(France) Pau	(France) Sébastien Piqueronies	(France) Lucas Rey	Stade du Hameau	14,999	Champions Cup Pool 4 5th place

== Draw ==
The 2025/26 EPCR Challenge Cup will see the 18 competing clubs drawn into three pools of six. Like previous seasons, the three pools will be made up of six teams, however clubs from the same nation, cannot be in the same pool, apart from France who will have two French teams in each pool - though they will not face each other in the pool stage, and there cannot be more than three teams from the United Rugby Championship in the same pool.

== Pool stage ==
=== Pool 1 ===
EPCR Challenge Cup Pool 1
Pos	Team	Pld	W	D	L	PF	PA	PD	TF	TA	TB	LB	Pts	Qualification
1	(France) Montpellier (1)	4	4	0	0	119	77	+42	18	10	4	0	20	Home round of 16
2	(Italy) Zebre Parma (5)	4	3	0	1	99	81	+18	12	11	2	0	14	Home round of 16
3	(Ireland) Connacht (8)	4	2	0	2	179	71	+108	26	11	3	2	13	Home round of 16
4	(Wales) Ospreys (14)	4	2	0	2	102	97	+5	16	12	3	2	13	Away round of 16
5	(Georgia (country)) Black Lion	4	1	0	3	58	132	−74	8	20	1	0	5	
6	(France) Montauban	4	0	0	4	81	180	−99	11	25	1	1	2	

Source: EPCR
Rules for classification: Tiebreakers for teams tied on points: 1) Number of matches won; 2) Difference between points for and against; 3) Total number of points for; 4) Aggregate number of points scored in matches between tied teams; 5) Number of matches won excluding the first match, then the second and so on until the tie is settled.

=== Pool 2 ===
EPCR Challenge Cup Pool 2
Pos	Team	Pld	W	D	L	PF	PA	PD	TF	TA	TB	LB	Pts	Qualification
1	(Italy) Benetton (2)	4	4	0	0	182	89	+93	24	11	3	0	19	Home round of 16
2	(England) Newcastle Red Bulls (6)	4	3	0	1	75	78	−3	11	11	1	0	13	Home round of 16
3	(Wales) Dragons (13)	4	2	0	2	96	148	−52	14	21	1	0	9	Away round of 16
4	(France) Perpignan (16)	4	1	1	2	111	107	+4	14	14	1	1	8	Away round of 16
5	(South Africa) Lions	4	1	1	2	90	93	−3	11	12	1	1	8	
6	(France) Lyon	4	0	0	4	87	126	−39	13	17	1	2	3	

Source: EPCR
Rules for classification: Tiebreakers for teams tied on points: 1) Number of matches won; 2) Difference between points for and against; 3) Total number of points for; 4) Aggregate number of points scored in matches between tied teams; 5) Number of matches won excluding the first match, then the second and so on until the tie is settled.

=== Pool 3 ===
EPCR Challenge Cup Pool 3
Pos	Team	Pld	W	D	L	PF	PA	PD	TF	TA	TB	LB	Pts	Qualification
1	(Ireland) Ulster (3)	4	3	0	1	141	55	+86	21	8	4	1	17	Home round of 16
2	(France) Stade Français (4)	4	3	0	1	129	90	+39	19	13	3	1	16	Home round of 16
3	(England) Exeter Chiefs (7)	4	2	1	1	129	70	+59	18	11	3	1	14	Home round of 16
4	(Wales) Cardiff (15)	4	2	0	2	78	108	−30	11	17	2	0	10	Away round of 16
5	(France) Racing 92	4	1	1	2	82	152	−70	13	21	2	0	8	
6	(South Africa) Cheetahs	4	0	0	4	62	146	−84	9	21	1	1	2	

Source: EPCR
Rules for classification: Tiebreakers for teams tied on points: 1) Number of matches won; 2) Difference between points for and against; 3) Total number of points for; 4) Aggregate number of points scored in matches between tied teams; 5) Number of matches won excluding the first match, then the second and so on until the tie is settled.

== Knockout stage ==
The knockout stage will begin with a single-leg round of 16 matches, consisting of the top 4 teams from each pool, and the teams ranked 5th in each pool of the 2025–26 European Rugby Champions Cup. The round of 16 follows a pre-determined format, while the quarter-finals and semi-finals guarantee home advantage to the higher-ranked team.

=== Seeding ===
Rank	Team	Pts	Diff	TF
Pool leaders
1	(France) Montpellier	20	+42	18
2	(Italy) Benetton	19	+93	24
3	(Ireland) Ulster	17	+86	21
Pool runners-up
4	(France) Stade Français	16	+39	19
5	(Italy) Zebre Parma	14	+18	12
6	(England) Newcastle Red Bulls	13	−3	13
Top two third placed teams
7	(England) Exeter Chiefs	14	+59	18
8	(Ireland) Connacht	13	+108	26
Champions Cup teams
9	(South Africa) Sharks	10	−10	16
10	(Ireland) Munster	8	−2	15
11	(France) La Rochelle	6	−13	15
12	(France) Pau	6	−60	15
Third best third placed team
13	(Wales) Dragons	9	−52	14
Fourth placed teams
14	(Wales) Ospreys	13	+5	16
15	(Wales) Cardiff	10	−30	11
16	(France) Perpignan	8	+4	14

=== Bracket ===
Round of 16
1	(France) Montpellier	53
16	(France) Perpignan	13
8	(Ireland) Connacht	29
9	(South Africa) Sharks	12
5	(Italy) Zebre Parma	31
12	(France) Pau	15
4	(France) Stade Français	31
13	(Wales) Dragons	36
3	(Ireland) Ulster	28
14	(Wales) Ospreys	24
6	(England) Newcastle Red Bulls	18
11	(France) La Rochelle	26
2	(Italy) Benetton	38
15	(Wales) Cardiff	35
7	(England) Exeter Chiefs	31
10	(Ireland) Munster	21

Quarter-finals
1	(France) Montpellier	45
8	(Ireland) Connacht	22
5	(Italy) Zebre Parma	32
13	(Wales) Dragons	35
3	(Ireland) Ulster	41
11	(France) La Rochelle	24
2	(Italy) Benetton	41
7	(England) Exeter Chiefs	44

Semi-finals
1	(France) Montpellier	18
13	(Wales) Dragons	12
3	(Ireland) Ulster	29
7	(England) Exeter Chiefs	12

Final
1	(France) Montpellier	59
3	(Ireland) Ulster	26

=== Round of 16 ===
3 April 2026
20:00

Connacht (Ireland) (8)	29–12	(9) (South Africa) Sharks
Try: Mullins 22' c Forde (2) 46' c, 62' c Hurley-Langton 54' m Con: Gilbert (3/4) 23', 47', 63'; Pen: Gilbert (1/1) 69'	Report	Pen: Smith (4/5) 6', 20', 31', 33'

Dexcom Stadium, Galway
Attendance: 6,197
Referee: Sam Grove-White (Scotland)

4 April 2026
12:30

Exeter Chiefs (England) (7)	31–21	(10) (Ireland) Munster
Try: Vintcent 13' c Slade 20' c Rigg 33' c Feyi-Waboso 38' c Con: Slade (4/4) 14', 21', 34', 40'; Pen: Slade (1/1) 28'	Report	Try: Crowley (2) 49' c, 75' c Beirne 68' c Con: Crowley (3/3) 50', 68', 75'; Cards: Beirne (yellow card) 73'

Sandy Park, Exeter
Attendance: 11,636
Referee: Jeremy Rozier (France)

4 April 2026
13:30

Montpellier (France) (1)	53–13	(16) (France) Perpignan
Try: Rates (3) 13' m, 27' m, 43' m Echegaray 34' c Price 54' m Piccardo 57' m Riccitelli (2) 67' c, 74' c N'Gandebe 71' c Con: Miotti (1/6) 35'; Vincent (3/3) 68', 72', 75'	Report	Try: Ceccarelli 45' c Con: Aucagne (1/1) 45'; Pen: Aucagne (2/3) 7', 24'; Cards: Velarte (yellow card) 66'

GGL Stadium, Montpellier
Attendance: 7,496
Referee: Adam Leal (England)

4 April 2026
18:30

Benetton (Italy) (2)	38–35	(15) (Wales) Cardiff
Try: Menoncello (2) 0' c, 41' m Umaga (2) 2' c, 13' c Gallo 12' c Ratave 28' m Con: Umaga (4/6) 0', 3', 12', 14'; Cards: Umaga (yellow card) 45'	Report	Try: Belcher 8' c Beetham (2) 21' c, 53' c Lawrence 39' c Bevan 44' c Con: Sheedy (5/5) 9', 22', 40', 45', 54'

Stadio Comunale di Monigo, Treviso
Attendance: 5,000
Referee: Kevin Bralley (France)

4 April 2026
20:00

Newcastle Red Bulls (England) (6)	18–26	(11) (France) La Rochelle
Try: Obatoyinbo 39' m McCallum 42' c Con: Connon (1/2) 43'; Pen: Connon (2/2) 12', 55'; Cards: Lee-Warner (yellow card) 56'	Report	Try: West 22' m Favre 30' m Garault 35' m Couillaud 79'; Pen: Jurd (2/3) 62', 76'; Drop: Jurd (0/1); Cards: West (yellow card) 38'

Kingston Park, Newcastle
Attendance: 4,274
Referee: Eoghan Cross (Ireland)

4 April 2026
20:00

Ulster (Ireland) (3)	28–24	(14) (Wales) Ospreys
Try: Izuchukwu 3' c McCann 34' c Stockdale 45' c Timoney 55' c Con: Doak (4/4) 4', 35', 46', 56'; Cards: Murphy (yellow card) 68'	Report	Try: Morgan-Williams 9' c Kasende 19' c Penalty try 68'; Con: D. Edwards (2/2) 9', 20'; Pen: D. Edwards (1/1) 29'; Cards: Morgan (yellow card) 56'

Affidea Stadium, Belfast
Attendance: 7,858
Referee: Anthony Woodthorpe (England)

5 April 2026
13:30

Stade Français (France) (4)	31–36	(13) (Wales) Dragons
Try: Ezeala (3) 37' c, 41' c, 61' c Tanga 44' c Con: Foursans-Bourdette (3/3) 38', 42', 45'; Henry (1/1) 62'; Pen: Foursans-Bourdette (1/1) 52'	Report	Try: O'Brien 8' c Coghlan 19' c Coleman 56' c Dee 69' m Jones 79' c Con: O'Brien (4/5) 9', 20', 57', 80'; Pen: O'Brien (1/2) 4'

Stade Jean Bouin, Paris
Attendance: 4,432
Referee: Morné Ferreira (South Africa)

5 April 2026
18:30

Zebre Parma (Italy) (5)	31–15	(12) (France) Pau
Try: Stavile (2) 2' c, 65' c Trulla 25' c Pitinari 48' c Con: Da Re (4/4) 2', 26', 48', 66; Pen: Da Re (1/1) 75'; Cards: Stavile (yellow card) 38'; Licata (yellow card) 70'	Report	Try: Tuipulotu 42' m Gorgadze 71' m Butlin 77' m

Stadio Sergio Lanfranchi, Parma
Attendance: 2,259
Referee: Ben Breakspear (Wales)

=== Quarter-finals ===
10 April 2026
20:00

Ulster (Ireland) (3)	41–24	(11) (France) La Rochelle
Try: Z. Ward (2) 4’ c, 46' m O'Toole 24’ c Izuchukwu 36’ c B. Ward 53’ m McCormick 76’ c Con: Doak (3/4) 5’, 25', 37'; Flannery (1/1) 77’ Pen: Doak 9'; Cards: Z. Ward (yellow card) 28'	Report	Try: Cancoriet 41’ c Latu 51’ c Sclavi 82’ c Con: Jurd (3/3) 42', 52', 83'; Pen: Jurd (1/1) 22'

Affidea Stadium, Belfast
Attendance: 7,169
Referee: Hollie Davidson (Scotland)

11 April 2026
13:30

Montpellier (France) (1)	45–22	(8) (Ireland) Connacht
Try: Penalty try '3; Tolofua 14’ c Haouas 28’ m Miotti 36’ c Cadot 52’ c Price 69’ c Welsch 79’ m Con: Miotti (2/3) 15', 37'; Vincent (2/3) 53’, 70'; Cards: Akrab (yellow card) 55'	Report	Try: Tierney-Martin 18' m Naughton 45' c Aungier 76' c Con: Gilbert (2/3) 45', 76'; Pen: Gilbert (1/1) 3'; Cards: Tierney-Martin (yellow card) 5'; Hurley-Langton (yellow card) 6'; Bolton (yellow card) 27'

GGL Stadium, Montpellier
Attendance: 5,340
Referee: Christophe Ridley (England)

11 April 2026
20:00

Zebre Parma (Italy) (5)	32–35	(13) (Wales) Dragons
Try: Trulla 25' c Bertaccini 37' c Krumov 78' m Quattrini 81' c Con: Da Re (3/4) 26', 38', 82'; Pen: Da Re (2/1) 13', 63'	Report	Try: Inisi 14' c Keddie (2) 30' c, 51' c Dee 65' m Con: O'Brien (3/4) 15', 31', 52'; Pen: O'Brie (3/3) 10', 44', 77'; Cards: Richards (yellow card) 23'; Inisi (yellow card) 32'

Stadio Sergio Lanfranchi, Parma
Attendance: 2,524
Referee: Luke Pearce (England)

12 April 2026
13:30

Benetton (Italy) (2)	41–44	(7) (England) Exeter Chiefs
Try: Cannone 5' c Umaga (2) 20' c, 65' c Ratave 37'c Bernasconi 45' c Con: Umaga (5/5) 6', 21', 38', 46', 66'; Pen: Umaga (2/2) 42', 63'; Cards: Ratave (yellow card) 15'	Report	Try: Woodburn 8' c Feyi-Waboso 24' c Skinner 42' c Zambonin 48' c Con: Slade (4/4) 9', 25', 43', 49'; Pen: Slade (3/3) 28', 70', 79'

Stadio Comunale di Monigo, Treviso
Attendance: 5,687
Referee: Luc Ramos (France)

=== Semi-finals ===
2 May 2026
17:30

Ulster (Ireland) (3)	29–12	(7) (England) Exeter Chiefs
Try: Augustus 28' c Murphy 47' c McCann 58' m Stewart 66' c Con: Doak (3/4) 28', 48', 67'; Pen: Doak (1/2) 41'; Cards: Stockdale (yellow card) 30'	Report	Try: Vintcent 32' c Ridl 82' m Con: Slade (1/2) 32'; Cards: Hammersley (yellow card) 74'

Affidea Stadium, Belfast
Attendance: 11,126
Referee: Pierre Brousset (France)

3 May 2026
13:30

Montpellier (France) (1)	18–12	(13) (Wales) Dragons
Try: Duguid 25' c Bernadet 67' m Con: Vincent (1/2) 26'; Pen: Vincent (2/3) 10', 42'; Cards: Abuladze (yellow card) 57'	Report	Try: Owen (2) 31' m, 73' c Con: O'Brien (1/2) 73'

GGL Stadium, Montpellier
Attendance: 8,103
Referee: Andrew Brace (Ireland)

=== Final ===
22 May 2026
21:00

Montpellier (France) (1)	59–26	(3) (Ireland) Ulster
Try: N'Gandebe 5' c Taofifénua (2) 15' c, 44' c Vunipola 31' c Bécognée 37' m Nouchi 48' c Erdocio 58' c Hounkpatin 63' c Vincent 78' m Con: Miotti (5/6) 6', 16', 32', 45', 49'; Coly (2/3) 59', 64'	Report	Try: Timoney 2' c Izuchukwu 27' m Baloucoune 55' c Lowry 72' c Con: Doak (2/3) 3', 56', 72'; Flannery (1/1) 72'

San Mamés Stadium, Bilbao
Attendance: 43,204
Referee: Matthew Carley (England)

Team details

FB	15	(Australia) Tom Banks	(substituted off) 57'
RW	14	(France) Gabriel N'Gandebe
OC	13	(France) Arthur Vincent
IC	12	(France) Auguste Cadot	(substituted off) 66'
LW	11	(France) Donovan Taofifénua
FH	10	(Argentina) Domingo Miotti	(substituted off) 55'
SH	9	(Scotland) Ali Price
N8	8	(England) Billy Vunipola (c)	(substituted off) 49'
OF	7	(France) Alexandre Bécognée
BF	6	(France) Lenni Nouchi
RL	5	(France) Tyler Duguid
LL	4	(France) Florian Verhaeghe	(substituted off) 52'
TP	3	(France) Mohamed Haouas	(substituted off) 57'
HK	2	(Australia) Jordan Uelese	(substituted off) 57'
LP	1	(France) Enzo Forletta	(substituted off) 57'
Substitutions:
HK	16	(France) Lyam Akrab	(substituted on) 57'
PR	17	(France) Baptiste Erdocio	(substituted on) 57'
PR	18	(Senegal) Wilfrid Hounkpatin	(substituted on) 57'
LK	19	(Wales) Adam Beard	(substituted on) 52'
BR	20	(France) Marco Tauleigne	(substituted on) 49'
SH	21	(France) Léo Coly	(substituted on) 55'
CE	22	(France) Thomas Darmon	(substituted on) 66'
FB	23	(France) Jon Echegaray	(substituted on) 57'
Coach:
(France) Joan Caudullo

FB	15	(Ireland) Michael Lowry
RW	14	(Ireland) Robert Baloucoune
OC	13	(Ireland) James Hume
IC	12	(Ireland) Jude Postlethwaite	(substituted off) 57'
LW	11	(Ireland) Zac Ward
FH	10	(Ireland) Jack Murphy	(substituted off) 64'
SH	9	(Ireland) Nathan Doak	(substituted off) 64'
N8	8	(South Africa) Juarno Augustus	(substituted off) 56'
OF	7	(Ireland) Nick Timoney (c)
BF	6	(Ireland) David McCann
RL	5	(Ireland) Cormac Izuchukwu
LL	4	(Ireland) Harry Sheridan	(substituted off) 61'
TP	3	(Ireland) Tom O'Toole	(substituted off) 49'
HK	2	(Ireland) Tom Stewart	(substituted off) 76'
LP	1	(Australia) Angus Bell	(substituted off) 49'
Substitutions:
HK	16	(Ireland) James McCormick	(substituted on) 76'
PR	17	(Ireland) Eric O'Sullivan	(substituted on) 49'
PR	18	(Ireland) Scott Wilson	(substituted on) 49'
LK	19	(Ireland) Charlie Irvine	(substituted on) 61'
BR	20	(Ireland) Bryn Ward	(substituted on) 56'
SH	21	(Ireland) Conor McKee	(substituted on) 64'
FH	22	(Ireland) Jake Flannery	(substituted on) 64'
FB	23	(Ireland) Ethan McIlroy	(substituted on) 57'
Coach:
(Ireland) Richie Murphy

Player of the Match:
(France) Alexandre Bécognée (Montpellier)

Assistant referees:
Andrea Piardi (Italy)
Craig Evans (Wales)
Television match official:
Mike Adamson (Scotland)
