= Lucas Rey (rugby union) =

French rugby union player (born 1997)

- Born: 27 April 1997 (age 29) Pau, France
- Height: 1.75 m (5 ft 9 in)
- Weight: 96 kg (15 st 2 lb; 212 lb)

Rugby union career
- Position: Hooker
- Current team: Section Paloise
Youth career
- 2008–2016: Section Paloise
Senior career
Years	Team	Apps	(Points)
2016–	Section Paloise	171	(55)
- Correct as of 4 April 2024
International career
Years	Team	Apps	(Points)
2022–2023	France U20		
- Correct as of 03 April 2024

Lucas Rey (born 27 April 1997) is a French rugby union player who plays as a hooker for Section Paloise in the Top 14 competition. He made his Top 14 debut with his club on 21 May 2016.

== Playing career ==
=== Early career ===
Lucas Rey was born on 27 April 1997 in Pau. The son of Joël Rey, a legend of Section Paloise, he initially leaned towards football before taking up rugby union in 2004. He then joined the academy at Section Paloise with his friend Antoine Hastoy.

He earned international selections with the France national under-18 rugby union team, with whom he won the Rugby Europe Under-18 Championship in 2015, alongside players like Arthur Retière, Alexandre Roumat, Florian Verhaeghe, or Peato Mauvaka.

=== Section Paloise ===
Lucas Rey began his professional career with his home club Section Paloise on 21 May 2016, during the 24th round of the 2015–16 Top 14 season against ASM Clermont Auvergne under the guidance of Simon Mannix. At the end of that season, he signed a two-season espoir contract with Section Paloise. In the 2016–17 Top 14 season, he played 3 Top 14 matches and 5 matches in the European Challenge. In December 2017, he signed his first professional contract and continued his development alongside his friend Antoine Hastoy. During the 2017–18 Top 14 season, he participated in 13 Top 14 matches with 2 starts and 8 matches in the European Challenge. The following season, in 2018–2019, he established himself as a starter and played 20 Top 14 matches and 4 matches in the European Challenge, scoring 2 tries in the championship. In 2019–2020, he played in 17 Top 14 matches, with 7 starts, and 4 matches in the European Challenge. He scored 1 try in the championship and 1 in the European Cup. In January 2021, he extended his contract for two additional seasons. On 9 May that year he played his hundredth match for Section Paloise in a 47–7 victory against SU Agen. During the 2020–21 Top 14 season, he played 26 matches, with 15 starts and 4 tries in Top 14, as well as one match in the European Challenge, serving as captain on several occasions. Starting from the 2021–22 Top 14 season, Rey became the full-time captain of the team. A fixture in the locker room, he participated in 24 Top 14 matches, including 16 as a starter, and scored 1 try. He also played one match in the European Challenge. In January 2023, he extended his contract until June 2027. On 28 May, during the final day of the season against Montpellier HR, he played his hundred and fiftieth match for Section Paloise. During the 2022–23 Top 14 season, he played 20 Top 14 matches, including 16 as a starter, and scored 1 try. He also played two matches in the EPCR Challenge Cup.

At the beginning of the 2023–2024 season, Rey admitted to being impacted by losing the captain's armband to Beka Gorgadze and then Luke Whitelock, in addition to the departure of his close friends Antoine Hastoy and Quentin Lespiaucq, forcing him to gain more perspective and maturity.
