= Franco Carrera (rugby union) =

Argentine rugby union player

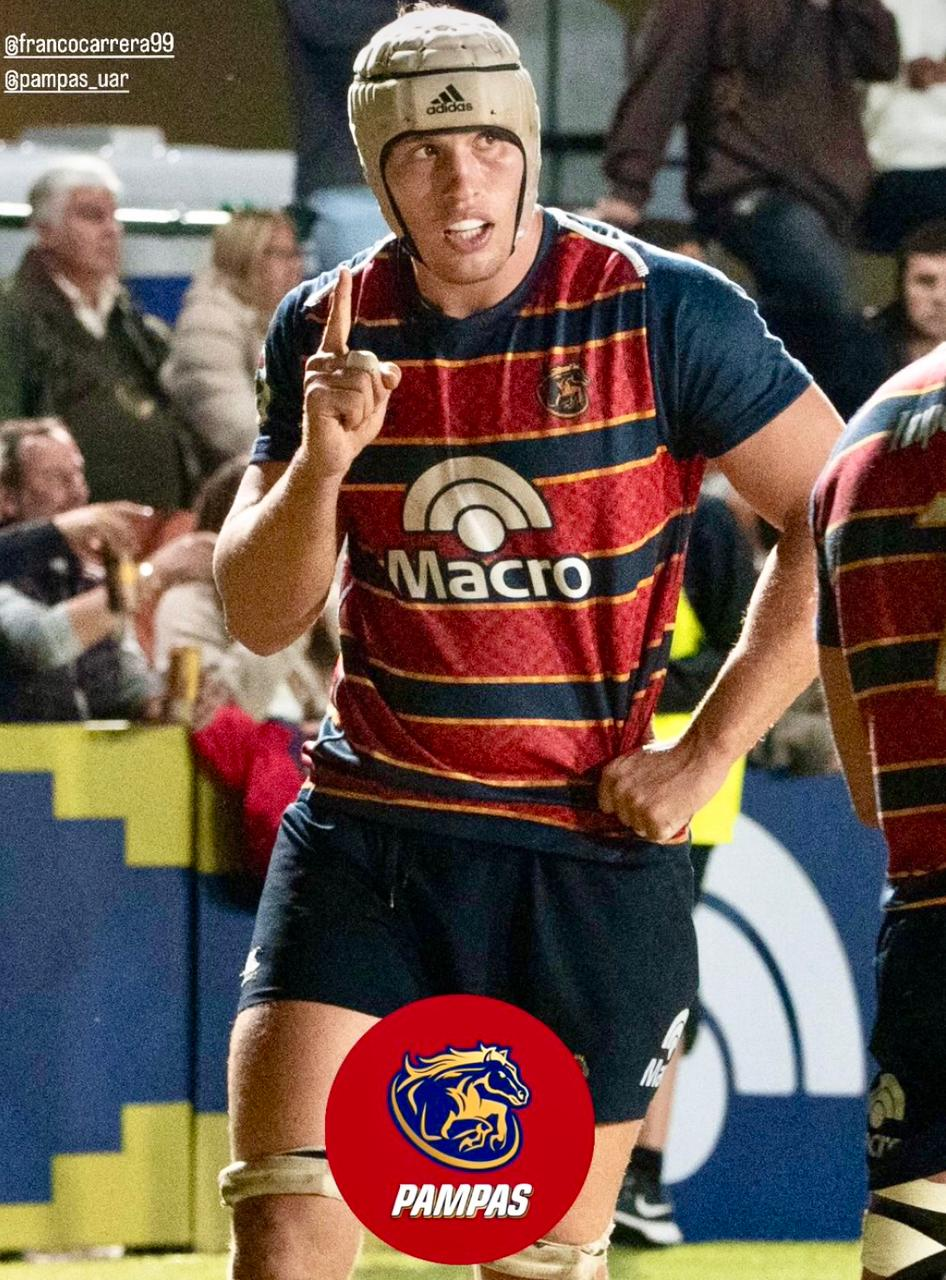
- Born: 2 June 1999 (age 27) Buenos Aires, Argentina
- Height: 1.98 m (6 ft 6 in)
- Weight: 115 kg (18.1 st; 254 lb)

Rugby union career
- Position: Lock
- Current team: Zebre
Youth career
- Club San Cirano
Senior career
Years	Team	Apps	(Points)
2019−2023	Club San Cirano		
2023–2025	Pampas XV		
→ 2024	Cobras XV		
2025–	Zebre	11	(0)
- Correct as of 13 Dec 2025
International career
Years	Team	Apps	(Points)
2024–	Argentina XV	3	(0)
- Correct as of 12 Dec 2025

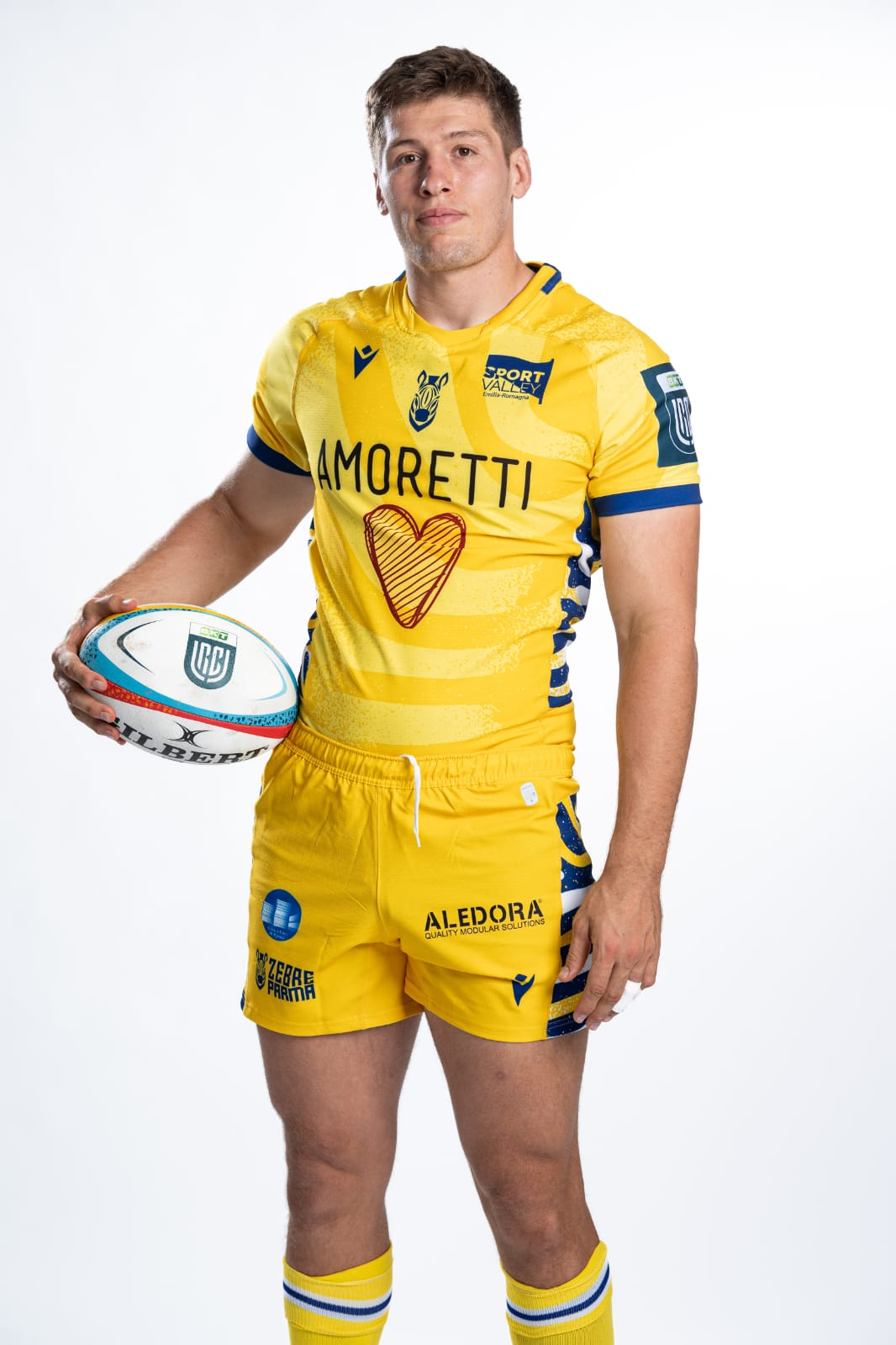
Zebre Season 25/26

Franco Carrera (Buenos Aires, 2 June 1999), is an Argentinian rugby union player. His usual position is Lock and he currently plays for Zebre Parma in United Rugby Championship.

== Club career ==
Franco Carrera started playing for the Club San Cirano, a team participating in the URBA league system in Argentina. At the time of his senior debut, in 2019, the team was in Primera División B. In 2021, the team achieved the promotion to Primera División A, the second level in the URBA system.

In 2023 he signed for the professional side Pampas XV to participate in the 2023 Super Rugby Americas season. In the following season, he moved to Brazil to play for Cobras XV, where stayed for one season, before returning to Pampas XV for the 2025 Super Rugby Americas season.

In August 2025, he signed with Italian team Zebre Parma for two seasons to compete in United Rugby Championship.

In August 2026 is convocated to Los Pumas squad to face Springboks & Wallabies.

== International career ==
In 2022 he earned the first call to a national camp, organised by the Argentine Rugby Union (UAR), before being selected in 2023 to the invitational team Sudamérica XV in the win for 28-24 against the Georgian team Black Lion.

In September 2024, he was called up for Argentina XV to play against Brazil and Chile, where he started both matches.

He played again in 2025 with Argentina XV during the July 2025 international window, while also joining for the first time the training camp of the Argentina national rugby union team as a development player.
