= Francesco Ruffolo =

Italian rugby union player

- Born: 31 October 2002 (age 24) Cosenza, Italy
- Height: 1.98 m (6 ft 6 in)
- Weight: 118 kg (260 lb; 18 st 8 lb)

Rugby union career
- Position: Lock
- Current team: Zebre Parma
Youth career
- Colorno
Senior career
Years	Team	Apps	(Points)
2022−2025	Colorno	29	(15)
2024–2025	→Zebre Parma	3	(0)
2025–	Zebre Parma		
- Correct as of 31 May 2025
International career
Years	Team	Apps	(Points)
2022	Italy Under 20	4	(0)
- Correct as of 21 September 24

Francesco Ruffolo is a professional Italian rugby union player. His usual position is lock and he currently plays for Zebre Parma in United Rugby Championship.

Under contract with Colorno, Ruffolo was named as Permit Player for Zebre Parma in summer 2024 ahead of the 2024–25 United Rugby Championship. He made his debut in Round 1 of United Rugby Championship in the 2024–25 season against the Cardiff.

On the 5th of May 2025 he joined Zebre senior team full time.

In 2022 he was named in Italy U20s squad.

On 3 December 2024 he was called in Italy Under 23 squad for test series against Emerging Scotland.
