= Giampietro Ribaldi =

Italian rugby union player

- Born: 12 March 1997 (age 29) Carpi, Italy
- Height: 1.86 m (6 ft 1 in)
- Weight: 110 kg (17 st; 240 lb)

Rugby union career
- Position: Hooker
- Current team: Zebre
Youth career
- Viadana
- –: Caimani Rugby
- –: F.I.R. Academy
Senior career
Years	Team	Apps	(Points)
2017–2022	Viadana	61	(75)
2021–2022	→ Zebre	10	(0)
2022–	Zebre	47	(10)
- Correct as of 9 Aug 2026
International career
Years	Team	Apps	(Points)
2021−2022	Emerging Italy	2	(10)
2022	Italy A	1	(10)
- Correct as of 24 June 2022

Giampietro Ribaldi (born 12 March 1997) is a professional Italian rugby union player, currently playing for United Rugby Championship side Zebre Parma. His preferred position is hooker.

== Zebre ==
Under contract with Top10 side Viadana, Ribaldi was announced as a Permit player for Zebre for Pro14 Rainbow Cup in 2021 and for 2021–22 United Rugby Championship season. He made his debut in the Round 1 of the Pro14 Rainbow Cup match against Edinburgh, coming on as a replacement.

== International career ==
On 8 December 2021, he was selected by Alessandro Troncon to be part of an Emerging Italy 27-man squad for the 2021 end-of-year rugby union internationals. On 26 May he was called for the South African tour in the 2022 mid-year rugby union tests against Namibia and Currie Cup XV team.
