= Samuele Locatelli =

Italian rugby union player

- Born: 30 July 2001 (age 25) Lecco, Italy
- Height: 1.87 m (6 ft 2 in)
- Weight: 102 kg (16 st 1 lb; 225 lb)

Rugby union career
- Position: Flanker
- Current team: Zebre Parma
Youth career
- Rugby Lecco
Senior career
Years	Team	Apps	(Points)
2021–2025	Viadana		
2024–2025	→Zebre Parma	5	(5)
2025–	Zebre Parma	16	(10)
- Correct as of 9 Aug 2026
International career
Years	Team	Apps	(Points)
2023–	Italy Under 23	1	(0)
2026–	Italy	1	(0)
- Correct as of 8 Nov 2026

Samuele Locatelli is an international Italian rugby union player. His usual position is flanker and he plays for Zebre Parma in United Rugby Championship and for Italy.

Under contract with Viadana, Locatelli was named as Permit Player for Zebre Parma in summer 2024. ahead of the 2024–25 United Rugby Championship. He made his debut in Round 1 of United Rugby Championship in the 2024–25 season against the Cardiff with a try.

In June 2025 he left Viadana to move to Zebre as full time member of the squad, ahead of the 2025–26 United Rugby Championship season.

Locatelli was named MVP of Serie A Elite 2023–24.

On 30 November 2023 he was called in Italy Under 23 squad for test series against IRFU Combined Academies.
