= Malik Faissal =

Italian rugby union player (born 2006)

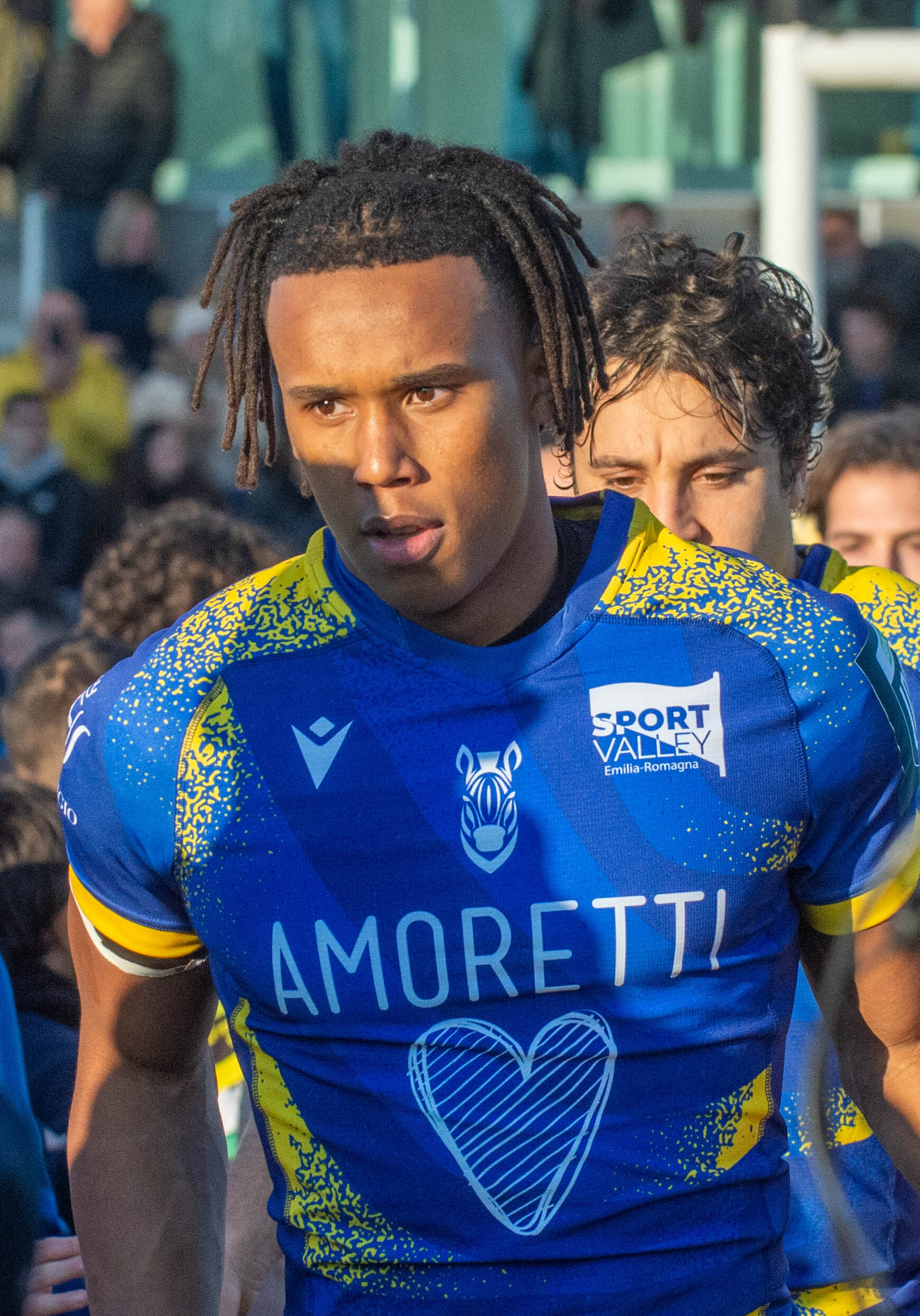
- Faissal with Zebre Parma in December 2025
- Born: 11 April 2006 (age 20) Fidenza, Emilia-Romagna, Italy
- Height: 1.83 m (6 ft 0 in)
- Weight: 90 kg (14 st; 200 lb)

Rugby union career
- Position: Wing
- Current team: Northampton Saints
Youth career
- Rugby Parma
- Accademia "Ivan Francescato"
Senior career
Years	Team	Apps	(Points)
2024−2025	Rugby Parma		
2025−2026	Zebre Parma	8	(15)
2026−	Northampton Saints	0	(0)
- Correct as of 23 June 2026
International career
Years	Team	Apps	(Points)
2024−2026	Italy U20	10	(15)
2026–	Italy	1	(0)
- Correct as of 23 June 2026

Malik Faissal (born 11 April 2006) is an Italian rugby union player who plays for Northampton Saints in the English PREM Rugby. His primary position is wing.

== Early life and youth career ==
Faissal was born on 11 April 2006 in Fidenza, in the Italian province of Parma, where he grew up. He started to play rugby at 6-years-old, in 2012, with Rugby Parma.

== Career ==
=== Zebre Parma ===
In January 2025, aged 18, he was selected for the Italy Under 20s squad to compete in the 2025 edition of the Six Nations Under 20s, putting in a promising overall performance.

At the start of the 2025–26 season, Faissal joined the senior squad of Zebre Parma, a franchise competing in the United Rugby Championship (URC) and the Challenge Cup, whilst still a member of the FIR academy. In October 2025, he was called up for a training camp in preparation for the Italian national team's autumn tour match against Australia, under the guidance of head coach Gonzalo Quesada. Then, on 6 December, he made his debut for Zebre on the opening day of the Challenge Cup, against US Montauban. Starting at right wing, he put in a fine 80-minute performance and scored a try in the corner, capping off a team move.

Alongside his professional debut, he was selected in January 2026 as one of the thirty-one players chosen by head coach Andrea Di Giandomenico to compete in the 2026 Six Nations Under 20s Championship.

Faissal continued to regularly appear for Zebre in URC after the Six Nations.

=== Northampton Saints ===
In May 2026, it was announced that Faissal has been signed by the Northampton Saints in the Premiership, ahead of the 2026–27 season.

== International career ==
Progressing rapidly through Rugby Parma's youth system, he soon made a name for himself thanks to his athletic ability and speed, which earned him call-ups to the national youth teams. In 2023, he was selected to take part in the Six Nations Festival U18. In July 2023, he joined the development centre in Milan, organised by FIR. In 2024, he competed in the Six Nations Festival U18 once again.

Faissal was included in Italy's 33-man squad on 17 June 2026, ahead of their 2026 Nations Championship Tests against Japan, New Zealand, and Australia. On 2 July, Faissal was named as Italy's starting right wing in their opening match against Japan in Tokyo. Faissal made his international debut alongside former Zebre Parma teammate Alessandro Ortombina.
