= Lyam Akrab =

French rugby union player (born 2005)

- Born: 6 September 2005 (age 21)
- Height: 178 cm (5 ft 10 in)
- Weight: 103 kg (227 lb)

Rugby union career
- Position: Hooker
- Current team: Montpelier
Senior career
Years	Team	Apps	(Points)
2024-	Montpelier		
International career
Years	Team	Apps	(Points)
- France U20

Lyam Akrab (born 6 September 2005) is a French professional rugby union footballer who plays as a Hooker for Montpellier Hérault Rugby.

== Club career ==
Akrab grew up in Villard-Bonnot, to the northeast of Grenoble. He played for CS Grésivaudan Belle Donne in Isère for ten years as a youngster, before spending a season at FC Grenoble Rugby and then joining Montpellier Hérault Rugby in his mid-teens. Initially playing at Prop, he transitioned to Hooker.

On 18 May 2024, Akrab made his senior debut for the Montpellier first team, featuring against Stade Toulousain in the Top 14 as a replacement, coming on for Christopher Tolofua at the start of the second half. On 14 December 2024, he scored his first professional try, scoring against the Welsh side Ospreys in the EPCR Challenge Cup.

== International career ==
Akrab scored a record seven tries for France U20 as the team won the 2025 U20 Six Nations Championship, finishing as the top scorer in the championship. It was also the most ever scored by a forward in a single edition of the championship. He was subsequently named the player of the tournament. That summer, he was selected for the 2025 World Rugby U20 Championship.
