= Matteo Nocera =

Italian rugby union player

- Born: 16 January 1999 (age 27) Carpi, Italy
- Height: 194 cm (6 ft 4 in)
- Weight: 128 kg (282 lb; 20 st 2 lb)

Rugby union career
- Position: Prop
- Current team: Zebre Parma
Youth career
- Rugby Carpi
- –: Modena Rugby 1965
Senior career
Years	Team	Apps	(Points)
2018–2020	Fiamme Oro	24	(30)
2019–2021	Zebre Parma	3	(0)
2020–2021	→ Fiamme Oro	5	(0)
2021–	Zebre Parma	66	(20)
- Correct as of 31 May 2025
International career
Years	Team	Apps	(Points)
2018–2019	Italy U20	17	(10)
2022	Italy A	1	(0)
- Correct as of 19 Nov 2022

Matteo Nocera (born 16 January 1999) is an Italian professional rugby union player who primarily plays prop for Zebre Parma of the United Rugby Championship.

== Professional career ==
In 2024 signed a professional contract with Zebre.

Under contract with Fiamme Oro, for 2019–20 Pro14 season, he was named as Permit Player for Zebre in Pro 14.

In 2018 and 2019, Nocera was named in the Italy Under 20 squad. On 26 May he was called in Italy A squad for the South African tour in the 2022 mid-year rugby union tests against Namibia and Currie Cup XV team.
