= Antoine Aucagne =

French rugby union player (born 2000)

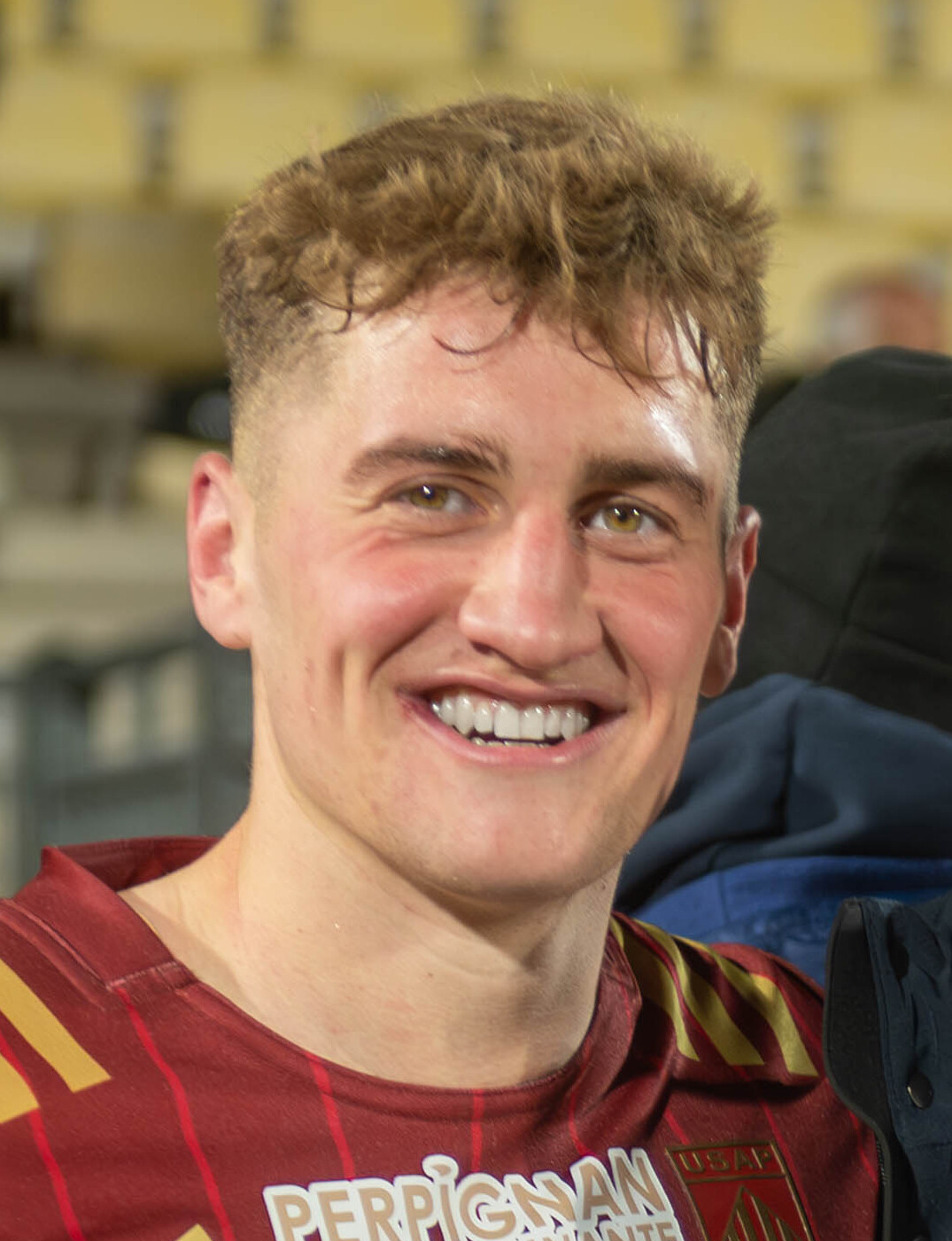
- Born: 11 April 2000 (age 26) Vichy, France
- Height: 1.84 m (6 ft 1/2 in)
- Weight: 80 kg (13 st; 180 lb)

Rugby union career
- Position: Fly-half
Senior career
Years	Team	Apps	(Points)
2017–2024	Aurillac		
2024–	Perpignan		
- Correct as of 27 February 2025

Antoine Aucagne (born 11 April 2000) is a French professional rugby union player who plays as a fly-half for Top 14 club Perpignan.

== Career ==
Born in Vichy, he is the nephew of former France international rugby union player David Aucagne. He came though the academy at Aurillac, having joined them in 2017 from RC Vichy. He made his first start for the first-team against Grenoble in February 2021. He also played for the French University team in 2022. In September 2023, he captained Aurillac for the first time, in the Pro D2, against Colomiers Rugby. Later that season, against the same opponent, he achieved a full house, scoring a try, conversion, penalty and drop goal in the same match. He finished the 2023-24 season as the top scorer in Pro D2.

He joined Top 14 club Perpignan from the start of the 2024-25 season.
