= Bautista Stavile =

Argentine rugby union player

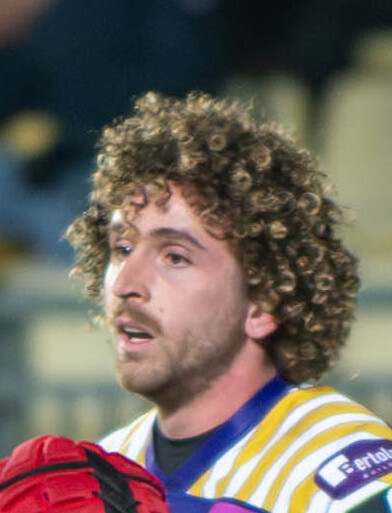
- Stavile in 2025
- Born: Bautista Stavile Bravin; 22 February 1997 (age 29) Mendoza, Argentina
- Height: 183 cm (6 ft 0 in)
- Weight: 100 kg (15 st 10 lb; 220 lb)

Rugby union career
- Position: Flanker
- Current team: Zebre Parma
Youth career
- Mendoza Rugby Club
Amateur team(s)
Years	Team	Apps	(Points)
2016−2019	Mendoza Rugby Club		
Senior career
Years	Team	Apps	(Points)
2020–2021	Selknam	11	(5)
2021–2022	Viadana	13	(25)
2022–2023	Rovigo Delta	19	(45)
2023–	Zebre Parma	43	(60)
- Correct as of 9 Aug 2026
International career
Years	Team	Apps	(Points)
2016–2017	Argentina Under 20	5	(-)
- Correct as of 13 March 2022

Bautista Stavile (born 22 February 1997) is an Argentine rugby union player, currently playing for United Rugby Championship side Zebre Parma. His preferred position is Flanker.

== Career ==
In 2020 and 2021, he was selected for Chilean Superliga Americana de Rugby team Seknam. From Summer 2021, he signed for Italian Top10 teams Viadana and Rovigo Delta. Stavile signed for Zebre Parma in June 2023 ahead of the 2023–24 United Rugby Championship. He made his debut in Round 1 of the 2023–24 season against the Ulster.

In 2016 and 2017, he played for Argentina Under 20 for annual World Rugby U20 Championship.
