= Marco Tauleigne =

France international rugby union player

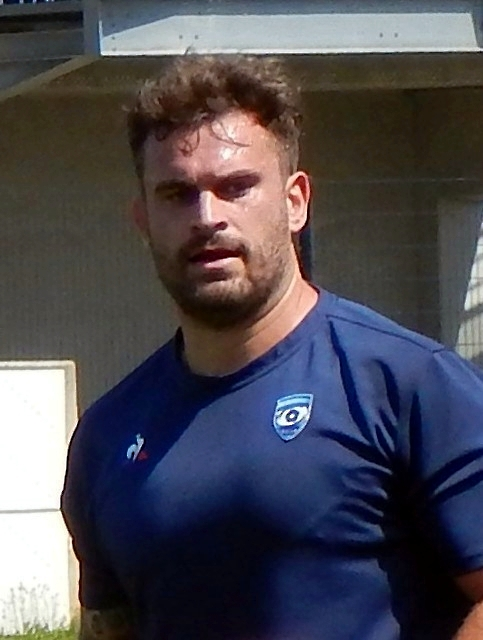
- Born: 30 August 1993 (age 33) Montélimar, France
- Height: 1.91 m (6 ft 3 in)
- Weight: 115 kg (18 st 2 lb)

Rugby union career
- Position: Back row
Senior career
Years	Team	Apps	(Points)
2012–2013	Bourgoin	14	(25)
2013–2021	Bordeaux Bègles	108	(60)
2021–	Montpellier	0	(0)
- Correct as of 28 October 2017
International career
Years	Team	Apps	(Points)
2018–	France	5	(0)
- Correct as of 17 March 2018

Marco Tauleigne (born 30 August 1993) is a French rugby union player. His position is in the Back row and he currently plays for Montpellier Hérault Rugby in the Top 14. He began his career at CS Bourgoin-Jallieu.
