= Giovanni Montemauri =

Italian rugby union player

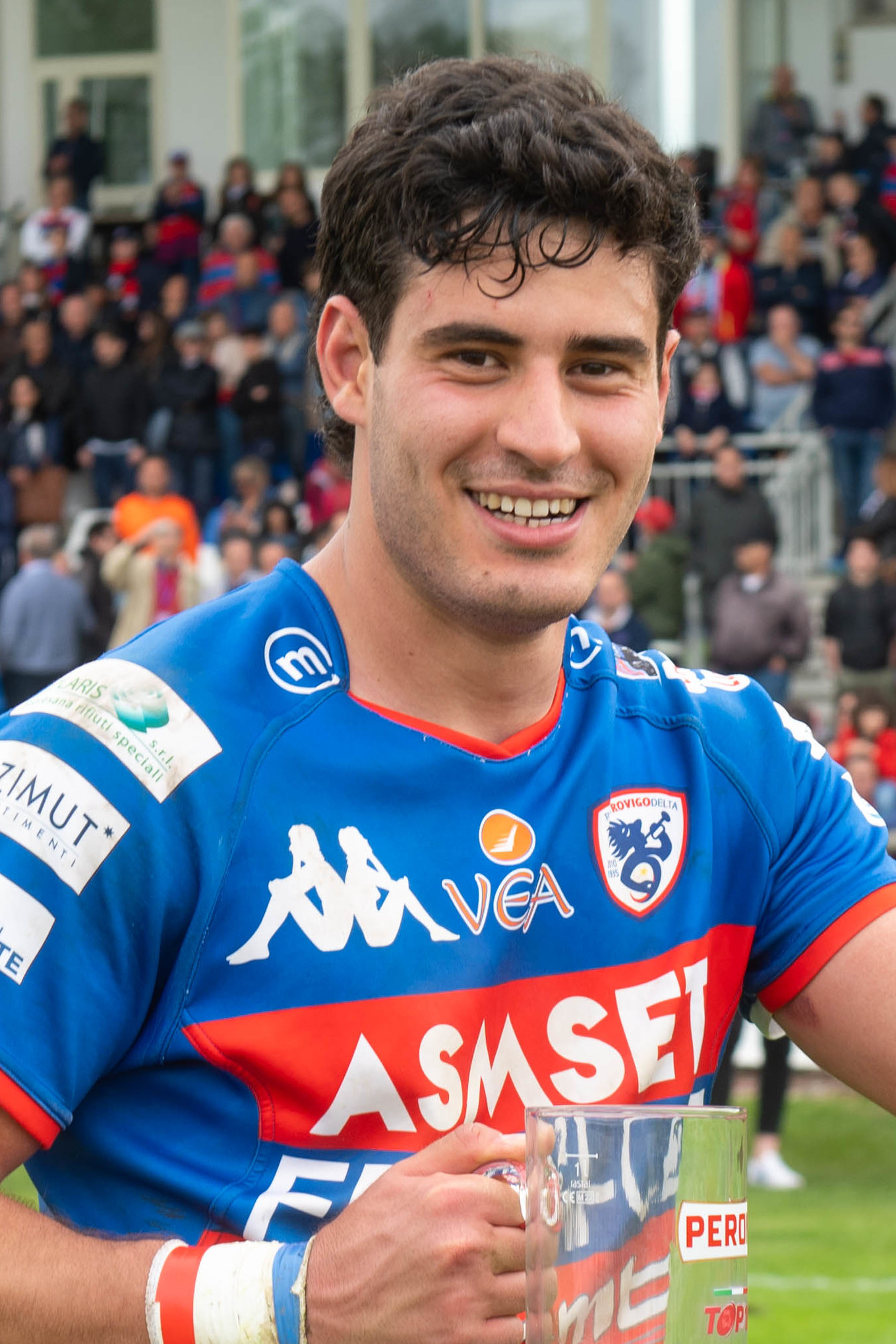
- Montemauri in 2023
- Born: 24 October 2000 (age 26) Rome, Italy
- Height: 189 cm (6 ft 2 in)
- Weight: 92 kg (203 lb; 14 st 7 lb)

Rugby union career
- Position: Fly-half
- Current team: Zebre Parma
Youth career
- 2005−2019: U.S. Primavera
- 2019−2020: Stade Français
Senior career
Years	Team	Apps	(Points)
2020–2022	Lazio	35	(123)
2022–2023	Rovigo Delta	20	(233)
2023−	Zebre Parma	45	(141)
- Correct as of 9 Aug 2026
International career
Years	Team	Apps	(Points)
2026	Italy XV	2	(11)
National sevens team
Years	Team		Comps
2022	Italy Sevens		1
- Correct as of 30 Apr 2023

Giovanni Montemauri (born 24 October 2000) is an Italian professional rugby union player who primarily plays fly-half for Zebre Parma of the United Rugby Championship.

== Professional career ==
Montemauri signed for Zebre Parma in June 2023 ahead of the 2023–24 United Rugby Championship. He made his debut in Round 2 of the 2023–24 season against the Ospreys.

On 10 January 2023, he was named in Italy A squad for a uncapped test against Romania A.

In June 2022, he was named in Italy Sevens squad for the 2022 Rugby World Cup Sevens European Qualifier. On 28 January 2026 he was selected by Massimo Brunello to be part of an Italy XV squad for two official tests against Scotland A and Chile during 2026 men's rugby union internationals window of spring..

He was named to Italy squad to participate in the 2025 Tour of Namibia and South Africa.
