= Jake Flannery =

Irish rugby union player (born 1999)

- Born: 7 June 1999 (age 27) Bansha, County Tipperary, Ireland
- Height: 1.84 m (6 ft 1/2 in)
- Weight: 91 kg (14.3 st; 201 lb)
- School: Rockwell College
- University: University of Limerick

Rugby union career
- Position(s): Fly-half, Fullback
Amateur team(s)
Years	Team	Apps	(Points)
- Kilfeacle and District
2021-2022	Shannon	9	(115)
2022-2023	Ballynahinch	1	
Senior career
Years	Team	Apps	(Points)
2020–2022	Munster	6	(8)
2022–	Ulster	44	(62)
- Correct as of 31 October 2026
International career
Years	Team	Apps	(Points)
2019	Ireland U20	10	(18)
2022	Emerging Ireland	3	(15)
- Correct as of 15 October 2022

Jake Flannery (born 7 June 1999) is an Irish rugby union player for United Rugby Championship and Champions Cup side Ulster. He plays as either a fly-half or fullback and represents Shannon in the All-Ireland League.

== Early life ==
Born in Bansha, County Tipperary, Flannery first began playing rugby with Kilfeacle and District RFC, before going on to attend Rockwell College, where he helped guide the school to the semi-finals of the 2018 Munster Schools Rugby Senior Cup. He achieved a maximum of 625 points in his leaving cert, which resulted in Flannery being awarded the prestigious Naughton Foundation scholarship, and he is now studying chemical engineering at the University of Limerick.

== Munster ==
Flannery made his Munster A debut in their 34–17 win against Dragons A in round 3 of the 2018–19 Celtic Cup on 21 September 2018. Following his performances for Munster A and with the Ireland under-20s, Flannery joined the Munster academy ahead of the 2019–20 season, and he made his senior competitive debut for the province as a replacement in their 2019–20 Pro14 round 12 fixture against Italian side Zebre on 21 February 2020, which Munster won 28–0. Flannery was a late call up to the bench after Shane Daly was injured during the warm-up and Darren Sweetnam was promoted to the starting XV. He joined the Munster senior squad on a one-year contract for the 2021–22 season. Flannery made his first start for the province in their 31–17 win against Italian side Benetton in round 16 of the 2020–21 Pro14 on 19 March 2021.

== Ulster ==
Flannery joined Ulster on a one-year contract from the 2022–23 season, and the province confirmed in April 2023 that he had signed a new three-year contract.

== Ireland ==
Selected in the Ireland under-20s squad for the 2019 Six Nations Under 20s Championship, Flannery started the wins against England, Scotland, Italy, France, and Wales, as Ireland secured their first grand slam in the tournament since 2007. He was retained in the under-20s squad for the 2019 World Rugby Under 20 Championship when it was confirmed in May 2019, playing in the pool B games against England, Australia and Italy, and the play-off games against England and New Zealand. He was selected for the Emerging Ireland squad for the Toyota Challenge in South Africa in September 2022.

== Honours ==
=== Ireland under-20s ===
- Six Nations Under 20s Championship:
  - Winner (1): 2019
- Grand Slam:
  - Winner (1): 2019
- Triple Crown:
  - Winner (1): 2019
