= Juan Pitinari =

Argentine rugby union player

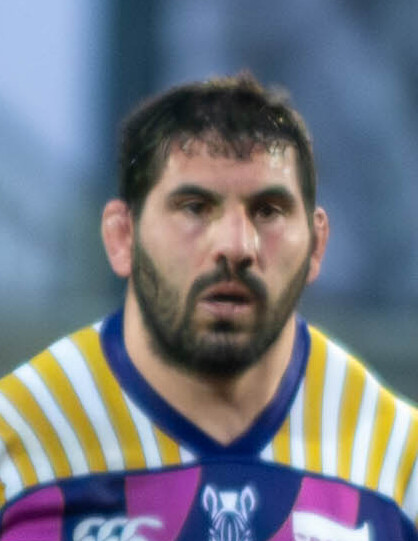
- Pitinari in 2025
- Born: Juan Manuel Pitinari; 18 January 1995 (age 31) Rosario, Argentina

Rugby union career
- Position: Prop
- Current team: Zebre Parma
Youth career
- Club Logaritmo Rugby
Amateur team(s)
Years	Team	Apps	(Points)
2006−2021	Old Resians Club		
Senior career
Years	Team	Apps	(Points)
2021–2022	Rugby Noceto	1	(0)
2022-	Zebre	64	(20)
- Correct as of 9 Aug 2026
International career
Years	Team	Apps	(Points)
2018–2019	Argentina XV	-	(-)
- Correct as of 13 March 2022

Juan Pitinari (born 18 January 1995) is an Argentine rugby union player, currently playing for United Rugby Championship side Zebre Parma. His preferred position is prop.

Under contract with Italian Serie A team Noceto, Pitinari was named as Permit Player in the Zebre Parma squad for the re-arranged Round 6 of the 2021–22 United Rugby Championship season against the Stormers. He made his debut in the same match as a replacement.

In 2018 and 2019, he played for Argentina XV in uncapped tests.
