= Florian Verhaeghe =

France international rugby union player

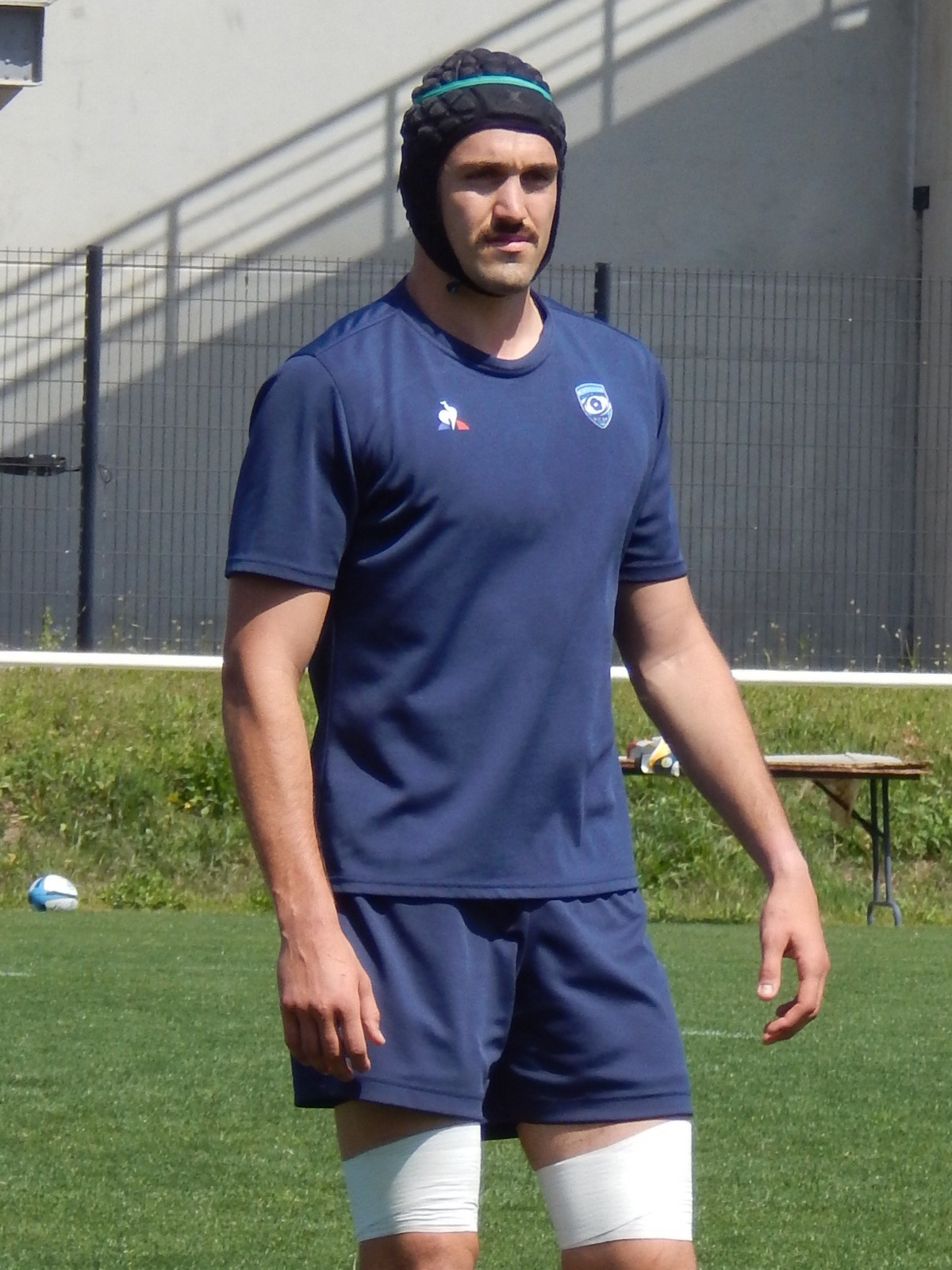
- Born: 27 April 1997 (age 29) Saint-Pol-sur-Mer, France
- Height: 2.04 m (6 ft 8 1/2 in)
- Weight: 110 kg (240 lb)

Rugby union career
- Position: Lock
Senior career
Years	Team	Apps	(Points)
2016–2020	Toulouse	52	(0)
2020–	Montpellier	17	(0)
- Correct as of 18 October 2021
International career
Years	Team	Apps	(Points)
2016–2017	France U20	19	(15)
2022–	France	3	(0)
- Correct as of 19 August 2023

Florian Verhaeghe (born 27 April 1997) is a French rugby union player, who plays for Montpellier Hérault Rugby. His regular playing position is Lock.

== Biography ==
Born in Saint-Pol-sur-Mer, near Dunkirk in the North of France, Florian Verhaeghe and his family moved to Montauban when he was aged only 4. After a short spell in football, Verhaeghe started playing rugby with US Montauban as he was 10 years old, before moving to Stade Toulousain 6 years later.

== Club career ==
Verhaeghe started playing with Toulouse's senior team during the 2016–17 season, notably starting his first game on the 6 May 2017, during a home Top 14 win against Bayonne, that would also prove to be the legend Thierry Dusautoir last game.

After the 2019–20 season, while he was regularly present in the Toulouse professional squad but not as a regular starter, he chose to sign for their Top 14 rival of Montpellier HR. There, after a season where he was often injured, whilst still managing to start the Challenge Cup victorious final with MHR, Verhaeghe really became a key element of his team during the 2021–22 Top 14 season.

== International career ==
Already an under-18 European champion and a captain with the under-20 for France, Verhaeghe was first called to the French national senior team by Fabien Galthié on the 18 October 2021, for the autumn internationals.
