= Harrison Keddie =

Welsh rugby union footballer

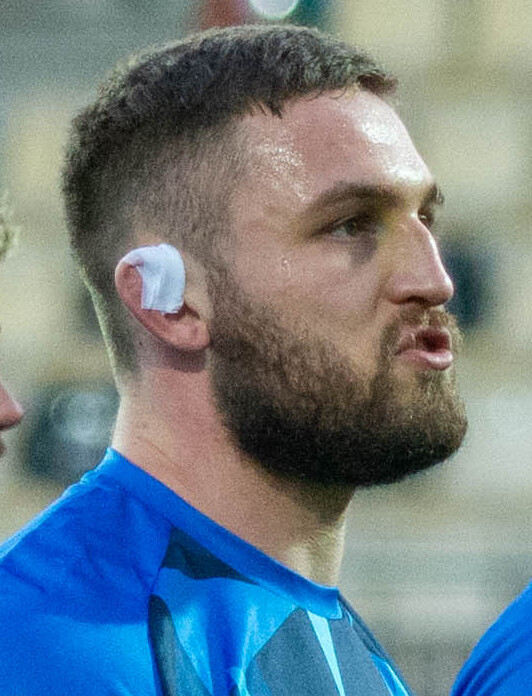
- Born: Harrison Keddie; 10 July 1996 (age 30) Magor, Monmouthshire, Wales
- Height: 188 cm (6 ft 2 in)
- Weight: 110 kg (17 st 5 lb)

Rugby union career
- Position(s): Number 8 Openside Flanker; Blindside Flanker
- Current team: Dragons
Senior career
Years	Team	Apps	(Points)
2014-	Dragons	137	(70)
- Correct as of 17:03, 5 February 2024 (UTC)
International career
Years	Team	Apps	(Points)
	Wales U20	10	(15)

Harrison Keddie (born 10 July 1996) is a Welsh rugby union player who plays for the Dragons regional team as a flanker. He is a Wales under-20 international.

Keddie made his debut for the Dragons regional team in 2015 having previously played for the Dragons academy, Cross Keys RFC and Ebbw Vale RFC. In January 2018 he signed a new 3 year contract with the Dragons.
