= Giovanni Licata =

Italy international rugby union player

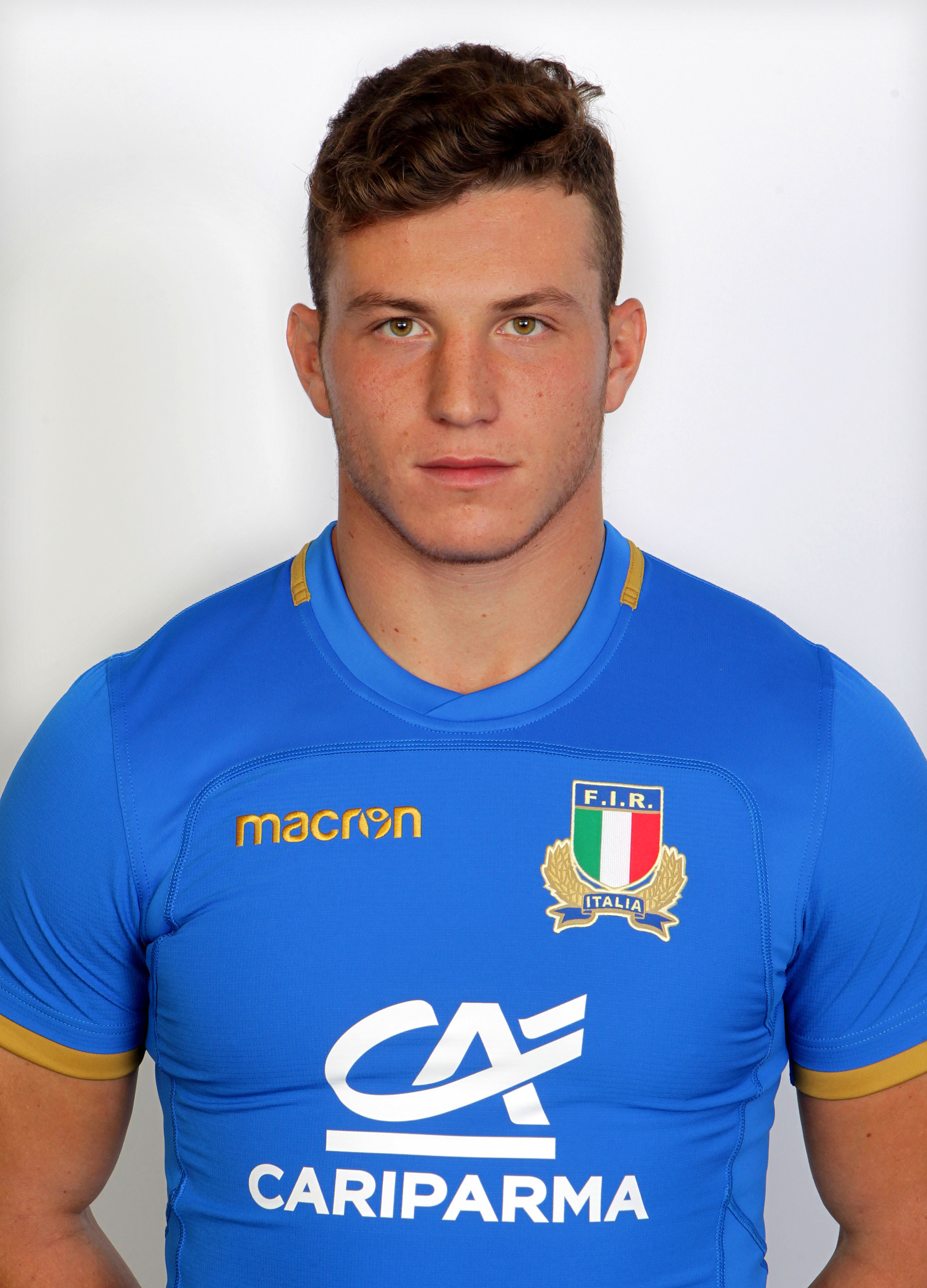
- Licata in 2017
- Born: 18 February 1997 (age 29) Agrigento, Italy
- Height: 1.95 m (6 ft 5 in)
- Weight: 112 kg (17 st 9 lb; 247 lb)

Rugby union career
- Position: Flanker
- Current team: Zebre Parma
Youth career
- 2012–2014: Miraglia Rugby
- 2014–2016: CUS Catania
Senior career
Years	Team	Apps	(Points)
2016–2017	F.I.R. Academy		
2017–2018	Fiamme Oro	7	(5)
2017–2018	→ Zebre	11	(20)
2018–	Zebre	91	(55)
- Correct as of 09 August 2026
International career
Years	Team	Apps	(Points)
2016–2017	Italy Under 20	14	(15)
2017–	Italy	13	(0)
- Correct as of 20 November 2021

Giovanni Licata (Italian pronunciation: [dʒoˈvanni liˈkaːta]; 18 February 1997) is an Italian professional rugby union player. He usually plays as flanker or number 8 for Zebre in United Rugby Championship.

Under contract with Fiamme Oro, for 2017–18 Pro14 season, Licata named like Permit Player for Zebre.

In 2016 and 2017, Licata was named in the Italy Under 20 squad and from 2017 he was also named in the Italy squad for Autumn International tests.
