= 2026 Six Nations Championship squads =

Rugby union tournament squads

This is a list of the complete squads for the 2026 Six Nations Championship, an annual rugby union tournament contested by the national rugby teams of England, France, Ireland, Italy, Scotland and Wales. Ireland are the defending champions.

Note: Number of caps and players' ages are indicated as of 5 February 2026 – the tournament's opening day. For players added to a squad during the tournament, their caps and age are indicated as of the date of their call-up.

== England ==
On 23 January 2026, England named a 36-player squad ahead of the 2026 Six Nations Championship.

Head coach: (England) Steve Borthwick

Player	Position	Date of birth (age)	Caps	Club/province
Luke Cowan-Dickie	Hooker	20 June 1993 (aged 32)	53	(England) Sale Sharks
Theo Dan	Hooker	26 December 2000 (aged 25)	20	(England) Saracens
Jamie George	Hooker	20 October 1990 (aged 35)	105	(England) Saracens
Trevor Davison	Prop	20 August 1992 (aged 33)	3	(England) Northampton Saints
Ellis Genge	Prop	16 February 1995 (aged 30)	75	(England) Bristol Bears
Joe Heyes	Prop	13 April 1999 (aged 26)	17	(England) Leicester Tigers
Emmanuel Iyogun	Prop	24 November 2000 (aged 25)	0	(England) Northampton Saints
Bevan Rodd	Prop	26 August 2000 (aged 25)	10	(England) Sale Sharks
Vilikesa Sela	Prop	12 April 2005 (aged 20)	0	(England) Bath
Ollie Chessum	Lock	6 September 2000 (aged 25)	30	(England) Leicester Tigers
Arthur Clark	Lock	19 December 2001 (aged 24)	1	(England) Gloucester
Alex Coles	Lock	21 September 1999 (aged 26)	14	(England) Northampton Saints
Maro Itoje (c)	Lock	28 October 1994 (aged 31)	97	(England) Saracens
Chandler Cunningham-South	Back row	18 March 2003 (aged 22)	20	(England) Harlequins
Tom Curry	Back row	15 June 1998 (aged 27)	65	(England) Sale Sharks
Ben Earl	Back row	7 January 1998 (aged 28)	46	(England) Saracens
Greg Fisilau	Back row	9 July 2003 (aged 22)	0	(England) Exeter Chiefs
Guy Pepper	Back row	21 April 2003 (aged 22)	7	(England) Bath
Henry Pollock	Back row	14 January 2005 (aged 21)	5	(England) Northampton Saints
Sam Underhill	Back row	22 November 1996 (aged 29)	45	(England) Bath
Alex Mitchell	Scrum-half	25 May 1997 (aged 28)	27	(England) Northampton Saints
Ben Spencer	Scrum-half	31 July 1992 (aged 33)	14	(England) Bath
Jack van Poortvliet	Scrum-half	15 May 2001 (aged 24)	21	(England) Leicester Tigers
George Ford	Fly-half	16 March 1993 (aged 32)	105	(England) Sale Sharks
Marcus Smith	Fly-half	14 February 1999 (aged 26)	46	(England) Harlequins
Seb Atkinson	Centre	21 May 2002 (aged 23)	2	(England) Gloucester
Fraser Dingwall	Centre	7 April 1999 (aged 26)	7	(England) Northampton Saints
Max Ojomoh	Centre	14 September 2000 (aged 25)	2	(England) Bath
Henry Slade	Centre	19 March 1993 (aged 32)	74	(England) Exeter Chiefs
Henry Arundell	Wing	8 November 2002 (aged 23)	11	(England) Bath
Immanuel Feyi-Waboso	Wing	20 December 2002 (aged 23)	13	(England) Exeter Chiefs
Tommy Freeman	Wing	5 March 2001 (aged 24)	22	(England) Northampton Saints
Cadan Murley	Wing	31 January 1999 (aged 27)	4	(England) Harlequins
Elliot Daly	Fullback	8 October 1992 (aged 33)	74	(England) Saracens
George Furbank	Fullback	17 October 1996 (aged 29)	14	(England) Northampton Saints
Freddie Steward	Fullback	5 December 2000 (aged 25)	41	(England) Leicester Tigers

== France ==
On 21 January 2026, France named a 42-player squad ahead of the 2026 Six Nations Championship.

Head coach: (France) Fabien Galthié

Player	Position	Date of birth (age)	Caps	Club/province
Maxime Lamothe	Hooker	3 October 1998 (aged 27)	2	(France) Bordeaux Bègles
Julien Marchand	Hooker	10 May 1995 (aged 30)	48	(France) Toulouse
Peato Mauvaka	Hooker	10 January 1997 (aged 29)	42	(France) Toulouse
Dorian Aldegheri	Prop	4 August 1993 (aged 32)	23	(France) Toulouse
Uini Atonio	Prop	26 March 1990 (aged 35)	68	(France) La Rochelle
Cyril Baille	Prop	15 September 1993 (aged 32)	57	(France) Toulouse
Jean-Baptiste Gros	Prop	29 May 1999 (aged 26)	40	(France) Toulon
Régis Montagne	Prop	30 September 2000 (aged 25)	5	(France) Clermont
Rodrigue Neti	Prop	28 April 1995 (aged 30)	4	(France) Toulouse
Dany Priso	Prop	2 January 1994 (aged 32)	18	(France) Toulon
Tevita Tatafu	Prop	13 October 2002 (aged 23)	2	(France) Bayonne
Hugo Auradou	Lock	20 July 2003 (aged 22)	10	(France) Pau
Thibaud Flament	Lock	29 April 1997 (aged 28)	34	(France) Toulouse
Mickaël Guillard	Lock	10 December 2000 (aged 25)	13	(France) Lyon
Emmanuel Meafou	Lock	12 July 1998 (aged 27)	11	(France) Toulouse
Tom Staniforth	Lock	13 August 1994 (aged 31)	0	(France) Castres
Cameron Woki	Lock	7 November 1998 (aged 27)	31	(France) Bordeaux Bègles
Paul Boudehent	Back row	21 November 1999 (aged 26)	21	(France) La Rochelle
François Cros	Back row	25 March 1994 (aged 31)	39	(France) Toulouse
Alexandre Fischer	Back row	19 January 1998 (aged 28)	3	(France) Bayonne
Oscar Jégou	Back row	31 May 2003 (aged 22)	9	(France) La Rochelle
Anthony Jelonch	Back row	28 July 1996 (aged 29)	35	(France) Toulouse
Temo Matiu	Back row	20 July 2001 (aged 24)	0	(France) Bordeaux Bègles
Lenni Nouchi	Back row	24 November 2003 (aged 22)	2	(France) Montpellier
Charles Ollivon	Back row	11 May 1993 (aged 32)	48	(France) Toulon
Thibault Daubagna	Scrum-half	20 May 1994 (aged 31)	2	(France) Pau
Antoine Dupont (c)	Scrum-half	15 November 1996 (aged 29)	59	(France) Toulouse
Baptiste Serin	Scrum-half	20 July 1994 (aged 31)	46	(France) Toulon
Matthieu Jalibert	Fly-half	6 November 1998 (aged 27)	35	(France) Bordeaux Bègles
Ugo Seunes	Fly-half	15 November 2000 (aged 25)	0	(France) Racing 92
Fabien Brau-Boirie	Centre	19 December 2005 (aged 20)	0	(France) Pau
Nicolas Depoortère	Centre	13 January 2003 (aged 23)	7	(France) Bordeaux Bègles
Kalvin Gourgues	Centre	27 March 2005 (aged 20)	1	(France) Toulouse
Yoram Moefana	Centre	18 July 2000 (aged 25)	36	(France) Bordeaux Bègles
Noah Nene	Centre	14 October 2004 (aged 21)	0	(France) Stade Français Paris
Théo Attissogbé	Wing	19 November 2004 (aged 21)	8	(France) Pau
Louis Bielle-Biarrey	Wing	16 June 2003 (aged 22)	22	(France) Bordeaux Bègles
Gaël Dréan	Wing	22 October 2000 (aged 25)	0	(France) Toulon
Aaron Grandidier-Nkanang	Wing	18 May 2000 (aged 25)	0	(France) Pau
Grégoire Arfeuil	Fullback	5 December 2004 (aged 21)	0	(France) Pau
Romain Buros	Fullback	31 July 1997 (aged 28)	1	(France) Bordeaux Bègles
Thomas Ramos	Fullback	23 July 1995 (aged 30)	47	(France) Toulouse

=== Call-ups ===
On 25 January 2026, Joshua Brennan was added to the squad, ahead of the opening round of the tournament as a replacement for Thibaud Flament.

On 26 January 2026, Georges-Henri Colombe and Alexandre Roumat were called up to the squad as injury cover for Uini Atonio and Paul Boudehent.

Player	Position	Date of birth (age)	Caps	Club/province
Georges-Henri Colombe	Prop	9 April 1998 (aged 27)	9	(France) Toulouse
Joshua Brennan	Lock	28 November 2001 (aged 24)	2	(France) Toulouse
Alexandre Roumat	Back row	27 June 1997 (aged 28)	10	(France) Toulouse

== Ireland ==
On 21 January 2026, Ireland named a 37-player squad ahead of the 2026 Six Nations.

- Head coach: (England) Andy Farrell

Player	Position	Date of birth (age)	Caps	Club/province
Ronan Kelleher	Hooker	24 January 1998 (aged 28)	43	(Ireland) Leinster
Dan Sheehan	Hooker	17 September 1998 (aged 27)	35	(Ireland) Leinster
Tom Stewart	Hooker	11 January 2001 (aged 25)	4	(Ireland) Ulster
Jack Boyle	Prop	10 March 2002 (aged 23)	4	(Ireland) Leinster
Michael Milne	Prop	5 February 1999 (aged 27)	2	(Ireland) Munster
Jeremy Loughman	Prop	22 July 1995 (aged 30)	5	(Ireland) Munster
Tom O'Toole	Prop	23 September 1998 (aged 27)	17	(Ireland) Ulster
Finlay Bealham	Prop	9 October 1991 (aged 34)	54	(Ireland) Connacht
Tom Clarkson	Prop	22 February 2000 (aged 25)	10	(Ireland) Leinster
Tadhg Furlong	Prop	14 November 1992 (aged 33)	82	(Ireland) Leinster
Thomas Ahern	Lock	22 February 2000 (aged 25)	2	(Ireland) Munster
Tadhg Beirne	Lock	8 January 1992 (aged 34)	65	(Ireland) Munster
James Ryan	Lock	24 July 1996 (aged 29)	76	(Ireland) Leinster
Edwin Edogbo	Lock	21 December 2002 (aged 23)	0	(Ireland) Munster
Joe McCarthy	Lock	26 March 2001 (aged 24)	19	(Ireland) Leinster
Jack Conan	Back row	29 July 1992 (aged 33)	55	(Ireland) Leinster
Caelan Doris (c)	Back row	2 April 1998 (aged 27)	55	(Ireland) Leinster
Cian Prendergast	Back row	23 February 2000 (aged 25)	8	(Ireland) Connacht
Nick Timoney	Back row	1 August 1995 (aged 30)	6	(Ireland) Ulster
Josh van der Flier	Back row	25 April 1993 (aged 32)	75	(Ireland) Leinster
Craig Casey	Scrum-half	19 April 1999 (aged 26)	24	(Ireland) Munster
Jamison Gibson-Park	Scrum-half	23 February 1992 (aged 33)	46	(Ireland) Leinster
Nathan Doak	Scrum-half	17 December 2001 (aged 24)	0	(Ireland) Ulster
Harry Byrne	Fly-half	22 April 1999 (aged 26)	4	(Ireland) Leinster
Jack Crowley	Fly-half	13 January 2000 (aged 26)	30	(Ireland) Munster
Ciarán Frawley	Fly-half	4 December 1997 (aged 28)	9	(Ireland) Leinster
Sam Prendergast	Fly-half	12 February 2003 (aged 22)	13	(Ireland) Leinster
Bundee Aki	Centre	7 April 1990 (aged 35)	68	(Ireland) Connacht
Stuart McCloskey	Centre	6 August 1992 (aged 33)	23	(Ireland) Ulster
Garry Ringrose	Centre	26 January 1995 (aged 31)	69	(Ireland) Leinster
Tom Farrell	Centre	1 October 1993 (aged 32)	2	(Ireland) Munster
James Lowe	Wing	8 July 1992 (aged 33)	43	(Ireland) Leinster
Tommy O'Brien	Wing	28 May 1998 (aged 27)	6	(Ireland) Leinster
Jacob Stockdale	Wing	3 April 1996 (aged 29)	40	(Ireland) Ulster
Robert Baloucoune	Wing	19 August 1997 (aged 28)	4	(Ireland) Ulster
Jamie Osborne	Fullback	16 November 2001 (aged 24)	10	(Ireland) Leinster
Hugo Keenan	Fullback	18 June 1996 (aged 29)	46	(Ireland) Leinster

=== Call-ups ===
On 25 January, Jack Boyle and Tom Ahern were withdrawn due to injury and replaced by Billy Bohan and Cormac Izuchukwu.

On 28 January, it was announced that Bundee Aki had been removed from the squad for disciplinary reasons. Jude Postlethwaite was called up to replace him. Later on the same day, Hugo Keenan was withdrawn from the squad due to an injury sustained in training camp.

Player	Position	Date of birth (age)	Caps	Club/province
Billy Bohan	Prop	22 November 2005 (aged 20)	0	(Ireland) Connacht
Cormac Izuchukwu	Lock	28 January 2000 (aged 26)	3	(Ireland) Ulster
Jude Postlethwaite	Centre	3 April 2002 (aged 23)	0	(Ireland) Ulster

== Italy ==
On 21 January 2026, Italy named a 33-player squad ahead of the 2026 Six Nations Championship.

Head coach: (Argentina) Gonzalo Quesada

Player	Position	Date of birth (age)	Caps	Club/province
Tommaso Di Bartolomeo	Hooker	4 January 2001 (aged 25)	6	(Italy) Zebre Parma
Pablo Dimcheff	Hooker	1 July 1999 (aged 26)	3	(France) Colomiers
Giacomo Nicotera	Hooker	15 July 1996 (aged 29)	36	(France) Stade Français Paris
Simone Ferrari	Prop	28 March 1994 (aged 31)	69	(Italy) Benetton
Danilo Fischetti	Prop	26 January 1998 (aged 28)	58	(England) Northampton Saints
Muhamed Hasa	Prop	10 September 2001 (aged 24)	4	(Italy) Zebre Parma
Marco Riccioni	Prop	19 October 1997 (aged 28)	36	(England) Saracens
Mirco Spagnolo	Prop	2 January 2001 (aged 25)	19	(Italy) Benetton
Niccolò Cannone	Lock	17 May 1998 (aged 27)	58	(Italy) Benetton
Riccardo Favretto	Lock	18 October 2001 (aged 24)	8	(Italy) Benetton
Federico Ruzza	Lock	4 August 1994 (aged 31)	67	(Italy) Benetton
Andrea Zambonin	Lock	3 September 2000 (aged 25)	14	(England) Exeter Chiefs
Lorenzo Cannone	Back row	28 January 2001 (aged 25)	33	(Italy) Benetton
Alessandro Izekor	Back row	5 March 2000 (aged 25)	8	(Italy) Benetton
Michele Lamaro (c)	Back row	3 June 1998 (aged 27)	49	(Italy) Benetton
Samuele Locatelli	Back row	30 July 2001 (aged 24)	0	(Italy) Zebre Parma
David Odiase	Back row	19 January 2003 (aged 23)	3	(Italy) Zebre Parma
Manuel Zuliani	Back row	26 April 2000 (aged 25)	38	(Italy) Benetton
Alessandro Fusco	Scrum-half	28 October 1999 (aged 26)	20	(Italy) Zebre Parma
Martin Page-Relo	Scrum-half	6 January 1999 (aged 27)	21	(France) Bordeaux
Stephen Varney	Scrum-half	15 May 2001 (aged 24)	36	(England) Exeter Chiefs
Giacomo Da Re	Fly-half	29 March 1999 (aged 26)	6	(Italy) Zebre Parma
Paolo Garbisi	Fly-half	26 April 2000 (aged 25)	49	(France) Toulon
Ignacio Brex	Centre	26 May 1992 (aged 33)	49	(France) Toulon
Leonardo Marin	Centre	23 February 2002 (aged 23)	17	(Italy) Benetton
Damiano Mazza	Centre	16 February 1999 (aged 26)	0	(Italy) Zebre Parma
Tommaso Menoncello	Centre	20 August 2002 (aged 23)	34	(Italy) Benetton
Paolo Odogwu	Centre	18 February 1997 (aged 28)	7	(Italy) Benetton
Monty Ioane	Wing	30 October 1994 (aged 31)	42	(France) Lyon
Louis Lynagh	Wing	3 December 2000 (aged 25)	9	(Italy) Benetton
Edoardo Todaro	Wing	24 September 2006 (aged 19)	1	(England) Northampton Saints
Matt Gallagher	Fullback	26 October 1996 (aged 29)	3	(Italy) Benetton
Lorenzo Pani	Fullback	4 July 2002 (aged 23)	8	(Italy) Zebre Parma

=== Call-ups ===
On 26 January 2026, Marco Riccioni and Martin Page-Relo left the squad due to injury and Giosuè Zilocchi and Alessandro Garbisi replaced them.

Player	Position	Date of birth (age)	Caps	Club/province
Giosuè Zilocchi	Prop	15 January 1997 (aged 29)	25	(Italy) Benetton
Alessandro Garbisi	Scrum-half	11 April 2002 (aged 23)	20	(Italy) Benetton

== Scotland ==
On 20 January, Scotland named a 40-player squad ahead of the 2026 Six Nations Championship.

Head coach: (Scotland) Gregor Townsend

Player	Position	Date of birth (age)	Caps	Club/province
Ewan Ashman	Hooker	3 April 2000 (aged 25)	32	(Scotland) Edinburgh
Dave Cherry	Hooker	3 January 1991 (aged 35)	16	(France) Vannes
George Turner	Hooker	10 August 1992 (aged 33)	50	(England) Harlequins
Zander Fagerson	Prop	19 January 1996 (aged 30)	76	(Scotland) Glasgow Warriors
Nathan McBeth	Prop	8 June 1998 (aged 27)	5	(Scotland) Glasgow Warriors
Elliot Millar-Mills	Prop	8 July 1992 (aged 33)	11	(England) Northampton Saints
D'Arcy Rae	Prop	21 December 1994 (aged 31)	5	(Scotland) Edinburgh
Pierre Schoeman	Prop	7 May 1994 (aged 31)	44	(Scotland) Edinburgh
Rory Sutherland	Prop	24 August 1992 (aged 33)	46	(Scotland) Glasgow Warriors
Gregor Brown	Lock	1 July 2001 (aged 24)	12	(Scotland) Glasgow Warriors
Alex Craig	Lock	26 April 1997 (aged 28)	6	(Scotland) Glasgow Warriors
Scott Cummings	Lock	3 December 1996 (aged 29)	45	(Scotland) Glasgow Warriors
Grant Gilchrist	Lock	9 August 1990 (aged 35)	83	(Scotland) Edinburgh
Jonny Gray	Lock	14 March 1994 (aged 31)	81	(France) Bordeaux
Max Williamson	Lock	5 August 2002 (aged 23)	9	(Scotland) Glasgow Warriors
Josh Bayliss	Back row	18 September 1997 (aged 28)	14	(England) Bath
Magnus Bradbury	Back row	23 August 1995 (aged 30)	21	(Scotland) Edinburgh
Rory Darge	Back row	23 February 2000 (aged 25)	34	(Scotland) Glasgow Warriors
Jack Dempsey	Back row	12 April 1994 (aged 31)	29	(Scotland) Glasgow Warriors
Freddy Douglas	Back row	20 May 2005 (aged 20)	1	(Scotland) Edinburgh
Matt Fagerson	Back row	16 July 1998 (aged 27)	59	(Scotland) Glasgow Warriors
Liam McConnell	Back row	24 June 2004 (aged 21)	1	(Scotland) Edinburgh
Jamie Ritchie	Back row	16 August 1996 (aged 29)	61	(France) Perpignan
Jamie Dobie	Scrum-half	7 June 2001 (aged 24)	17	(Scotland) Glasgow Warriors
George Horne	Scrum-half	12 May 1995 (aged 30)	40	(Scotland) Glasgow Warriors
Ben White	Scrum-half	27 May 1998 (aged 27)	31	(France) Toulon
Fergus Burke	Fly-half	3 September 1999 (aged 26)	3	(England) Saracens
Adam Hastings	Fly-half	5 October 1996 (aged 29)	35	(Scotland) Glasgow Warriors
Finn Russell	Fly-half	23 September 1992 (aged 33)	89	(England) Bath
Rory Hutchinson	Centre	29 January 1996 (aged 30)	11	(England) Northampton Saints
Huw Jones	Centre	17 December 1993 (aged 32)	58	(Scotland) Glasgow Warriors
Tom Jordan	Centre	18 September 1998 (aged 27)	12	(England) Bristol Bears
Stafford McDowall	Centre	24 February 1998 (aged 27)	16	(Scotland) Glasgow Warriors
Sione Tuipulotu (c)	Centre	12 February 1997 (aged 28)	33	(Scotland) Glasgow Warriors
Darcy Graham	Wing	21 June 1997 (aged 28)	50	(Scotland) Edinburgh
Kyle Rowe	Wing	8 February 1998 (aged 27)	17	(Scotland) Glasgow Warriors
Kyle Steyn	Wing	29 January 1994 (aged 32)	28	(Scotland) Glasgow Warriors
Duhan van der Merwe	Wing	4 June 1995 (aged 30)	52	(Scotland) Edinburgh
Blair Kinghorn	Fullback	18 January 1997 (aged 29)	62	(France) Toulouse
Ollie Smith	Fullback	7 August 2000 (aged 25)	12	(Scotland) Glasgow Warriors

=== Call-ups ===
On 27 January 2026 Gregor Hiddleston and Gus Warr were added to the squad.

Player	Position	Date of birth (age)	Caps	Club/province
Gregor Hiddleston	Hooker	26 March 2002 (aged 23)	0	(Scotland) Glasgow Warriors
Gus Warr	Scrum-half	24 September 1999 (aged 26)	2	(England) Sale Sharks

== Wales ==
On 20 January 2026, Wales named a 38-player squad ahead of the 2026 Six Nations Championship.

- Head coach: (Wales) Steve Tandy

Player	Position	Date of birth (age)	Caps	Club/province
Liam Belcher	Hooker	28 April 1996 (aged 29)	4	(Wales) Cardiff
Ryan Elias	Hooker	21 December 2000 (aged 25)	44	(Wales) Scarlets
Dewi Lake (c)	Hooker	16 March 1999 (aged 26)	26	(Wales) Ospreys
Keiron Assiratti	Prop	30 June 1997 (aged 28)	19	(Wales) Cardiff
Rhys Carré	Prop	8 February 1998 (aged 27)	23	(England) Saracens
Tomas Francis	Prop	27 April 1992 (aged 33)	77	(France) Provence
Archie Griffin	Prop	24 July 2001 (aged 24)	11	(England) Bath
Nicky Smith	Prop	7 April 1994 (aged 31)	58	(England) Leicester Tigers
Gareth Thomas	Prop	2 August 1993 (aged 32)	44	(Wales) Ospreys
Adam Beard	Lock	7 January 1996 (aged 30)	61	(France) Montpellier
Ben Carter	Lock	23 January 2001 (aged 25)	14	(Wales) Dragons
Dafydd Jenkins	Lock	5 December 2002 (aged 23)	26	(England) Exeter Chiefs
Freddie Thomas	Lock	9 November 2001 (aged 24)	7	(England) Gloucester
James Botham	Back row	22 February 1998 (aged 27)	18	(Wales) Cardiff
Olly Cracknell	Back row	26 May 1994 (aged 31)	2	(England) Leicester Tigers
Harri Deaves	Back row	13 June 2001 (aged 24)	1	(Wales) Ospreys
Alex Mann	Back row	6 January 2002 (aged 24)	11	(Wales) Cardiff
Josh Macleod	Back row	26 October 1996 (aged 29)	4	(Wales) Scarlets
Taine Plumtree	Back row	9 March 2000 (aged 25)	11	(Wales) Scarlets
Aaron Wainwright	Back row	25 September 1997 (aged 28)	62	(Wales) Dragons
Kieran Hardy	Scrum-half	30 November 1995 (aged 30)	28	(Wales) Ospreys
Reuben Morgan-Williams	Scrum-half	3 February 1998 (aged 28)	2	(Wales) Ospreys
Tomos Williams	Scrum-half	1 January 1995 (aged 31)	67	(England) Gloucester
Sam Costelow	Fly-half	10 January 2001 (aged 25)	19	(Wales) Scarlets
Dan Edwards	Fly-half	7 May 2003 (aged 22)	7	(Wales) Ospreys
Jarrod Evans	Fly-half	25 July 1996 (aged 29)	14	(England) Harlequins
Joe Hawkins	Centre	11 June 2002 (aged 23)	7	(Wales) Scarlets
Louie Hennessey	Centre	29 March 2004 (aged 21)	0	(England) Bath
Eddie James	Centre	10 August 2002 (aged 23)	4	(Wales) Scarlets
Ben Thomas	Centre	25 November 1998 (aged 27)	17	(Wales) Cardiff
Owen Watkin	Centre	12 October 1996 (aged 29)	43	(Wales) Ospreys
Josh Adams	Wing	21 April 1995 (aged 30)	65	(Wales) Cardiff
Ellis Mee	Wing	6 October 2003 (aged 22)	8	(Wales) Scarlets
Mason Grady	Wing	29 March 2002 (aged 23)	15	(Wales) Cardiff
Louis Rees-Zammit	Wing	2 February 2001 (aged 25)	35	(England) Bristol Bears
Tom Rogers	Wing	17 December 1998 (aged 27)	13	(Wales) Scarlets
Gabriel Hamer-Webb	Wing	7 November 2000 (aged 25)	0	(England) Leicester Tigers
Blair Murray	Fullback	9 October 2001 (aged 24)	14	(Wales) Scarlets

=== Call-ups ===
On 27 January 2026, Sam Wainwright was called into the squad to replace injured Keiron Assiratti.

On 29 January 2026, Rhys Davies was added to the squad.

Player	Position	Date of birth (age)	Caps	Club/province
Rhys Davies	Lock	9 November 1998 (aged 27)	4	(Wales) Ospreys
Sam Wainwright	Prop	7 May 1998 (aged 27)	4	(Wales) Cardiff
