= 2024–25 Zebre Parma season =

Zebre Parma
- Full name: Zebre Parma
- Union: (Italy) Federazione Italiana Rugby
- Nickname: The XV of the North-West (il XV del Nord-Ovest)
- Founded: 1973 (as Invitational Team – disbanded in 1997); 2012; 14 years ago (as Professional Team)
- Location: Parma, Italy
- Ground(s): Stadio Sergio Lanfranchi, Parma (Capacity: 5,000)
- President: Domenico Bordieri
- Coach: Massimo Brunello
- Captain: Danilo Fischetti
- League: United Rugby Championship
- 2024–25: 15th (4th, Scottish/Italian Shield)
1st kit	2nd kit

Official website
- www.zebreparma.it

The 2024–25 season is Zebre Parma's fourth season in the United Rugby Championship, and their 13th season of professional rugby. Along with competing in the URC and its Scottish-Italian Shield competition, the club will also participate in the 2024-25 European Rugby Challenge Cup.

Zebre drew an average home attendance of 2,630 in the 2024-25 URC season.

== Senior squad ==
Zebre Parma United Rugby Championship squad (Note: Taking into account signings and departures head of 2024–25 season as listed on List of 2024–25 United Rugby Championship transfers.)
**Props**: (Italy) **Paolo Buonfiglio**; (Italy) **Danilo Fischetti** (c); (Italy) Luca Franceschetto; (Italy) Muhamed Hasa; (Italy) **Ion Neculai**; (Italy) Matteo Nocera; (Argentina) Juan Pitinari*; (Italy) **Luca Rizzoli**; **Hookers**: (Italy) **Luca Bigi**; (Italy) Tommaso Di Bartolomeo; (Italy) Giampietro Ribaldi; **Locks**: (Italy) Matteo Canali; (Italy) Leonard Krumov; (Fiji) **Rusiate Nasove**; (Italy) **Andrea Zambonin**	**Back row**: (Italy) Luca Andreani; (Italy) Iacopo Bianchi; (Italy) Giacomo Ferrari; (Italy) **Giovanni Licata**; (Italy) Davide Ruggeri; (Argentina) Bautista Stavile*; (Argentina) Guido Volpi*; **Scrum-halves**: (Argentina) Thomas Dominguez*; (Italy) **Alessandro Fusco**; (Argentina) **Gonzalo García**; (Italy) Ratko Jelic; **Fly-halves**: (Italy) **Giacomo Da Re**; (Italy) Giovanni Montemauri; (Argentina) Gerónimo Prisciantelli*	**Centres**: (New Zealand) Scott Gregory; (Italy) **Enrico Lucchin**; (Italy) Damiano Mazza; (Italy) **Luca Morisi**; **Wings**: (Italy) **Simone Gesi**; (Tonga) **Fetuli Paea**; **Fullbacks**: (Italy) **Lorenzo Pani**; (Italy) **Jacopo Trulla**
(c) denotes the team captain, **Bold** denotes internationally capped players.^{*} denotes players qualified to play for Italy on residency or dual nationality. Players and their allocated positions from the Zebre Parma website.

=== Additional player squad ===
Zebre Parma Additional Players squad (Note: Academy player on loan to Serie A Elite team Colorno) (Note: Academy player on loan to Serie A team Noceto) (Note: Academy player on loan to Serie A Elite team Viadana) (Note: Academy player on loan to Serie A team Parma) (Note: Academy player on loan to Serie A Elite team Valorugby Emilia) (Note: Additional player under contract with Serie A Elite team Colorno) (Note: Additional player under contract with Serie A Elite team Valorugby Emilia) (Note: Additional player under contract with Serie A Elite team Viadana) (Note: Additional player under contract with Serie A Elite team Viadana) (Note: Temporary loan from URC team Benetton)
**Props**: (Italy) Samuele Taddei; (Italy) Bruno Vallesi; **Hookers**: (Italy) Giovanni Quattrini; **Locks**: (Italy) Samuele Mirenzi; (Italy) Francesco Ruffolo; (Italy) Davide Salvan	**Back row**: (Italy) Giacomo Milano; (Italy) Samuele Locatelli; **Scrum-halves**: (Argentina) Patricio Baronio*; (Australia) Thomas Manca*; **Fly-halves**: (Italy) Simone Brisighella	**Centres**: (Italy) **Giulio Bertaccini**; (Italy) Filippo Drago; **Wings**: (Italy) Albert Einstein Batista; (Italy) Filippo Bozzoni; (Italy) Alessandro Gesi; **Fullbacks**: None currently named
(c) denotes the team captain, **Bold** denotes internationally capped players.^{*} denotes players qualified to play for Italy on residency or dual nationality. Players and their allocated positions from the Zebre Rugby and F.I.R. website.

== United Rugby Championship ==
Main table

Pos	Team	Pld	W	D	L	PF	PA	PD	TF	TA	TB	LB	Pts	Qualification
1	Leinster (CH)	18	16	0	2	542	256	+286	79	35	11	1	76	Qualifies for home URC quarter-final; Qualification for the 2025–26 Champions Cup
2	Bulls (RU)	18	14	0	4	542	361	+181	71	44	9	3	68	Qualifies for home URC quarter-final; Qualification for the 2025–26 Champions Cup
3	Sharks	18	13	0	5	436	402	+34	55	59	7	3	62	Qualifies for home URC quarter-final; Qualification for the 2025–26 Champions Cup
4	Glasgow Warriors	18	11	0	7	468	327	+141	70	40	10	5	59	Qualifies for home URC quarter-final; Qualification for the 2025–26 Champions Cup
5	Stormers	18	10	0	8	507	418	+89	66	57	11	4	55	Qualifies for URC quarter-final; Qualification for the 2025–26 Champions Cup
6	Munster	18	9	0	9	444	429	+15	67	59	11	4	51	Qualifies for URC quarter-final; Qualification for the 2025–26 Champions Cup
7	Edinburgh	18	8	1	9	471	407	+64	66	57	9	6	49	Qualifies for URC quarter-final; Qualification for the 2025–26 Champions Cup
8	Scarlets	18	9	1	8	427	382	+45	50	52	6	4	48	Qualifies for URC quarter-final; Qualification for the 2025–26 Champions Cup
9	Cardiff	18	8	1	9	409	477	−68	63	65	10	3	47	Qualification for the 2025–26 Challenge Cup
10	Benetton	18	9	1	8	393	478	−85	50	65	7	1	46	Qualification for the 2025–26 Challenge Cup
11	Lions	18	8	0	10	402	440	−38	53	60	5	3	40	Qualification for the 2025–26 Challenge Cup
12	Ospreys	18	7	1	10	437	454	−17	60	63	6	4	40	Qualification for the 2025–26 Challenge Cup
13	Connacht	18	6	0	12	420	472	−52	64	62	9	6	39	Qualification for the 2025–26 Challenge Cup
14	Ulster	18	7	0	11	414	506	−92	59	72	5	5	38	Qualification for the 2025–26 Challenge Cup
15	Zebre Parma	18	5	1	12	302	503	−201	38	72	3	4	29	Qualification for the 2025–26 Challenge Cup
16	Dragons	18	1	0	17	335	637	−302	43	92	1	4	9	Qualification for the 2025–26 Challenge Cup

Source: UnitedRugby.com
Rules for classification: Tiebreakers for teams tied on points: 1) Number of matches won 2) The difference between points for and points against 3) The number of tries scored 4) The most points scored 5) The difference between tries for and tries against 6) The fewest red cards received 7) The fewest yellow cards received.

== URC Scottish -x- Italian Shield ==
2024–25 United Rugby Championship Regional Shield Pools
(Italy) (Scotland) Italian x Scottish Shield
	Team	P	W	D	L	PF	PA	PD	TF	TA	TBP	LBP	Pts	Pos overall
1	(Scotland) Glasgow Warriors (S)	6	4	0	2	136	76	+60	20	9	3	1	20	4
2	(Italy) Benetton	6	4	0	2	132	139	–7	19	19	3	0	19	10
3	(Scotland) Edinburgh	6	2	1	3	134	141	–7	18	20	1	2	13	7
4	(Italy) Zebre Parma	6	1	1	4	88	124	–46	9	18	0	1	7	15
If teams are level at any stage, tiebreakers are applied in the following order: 1. number of matches won 2. the difference between points for and points against 3. the number of tries scored 4. the most points scored 5. the difference between tries for and tries against 6. the fewest red cards received 7. the fewest yellow cards received
Green background indicates teams currently leading the regional shield. Upon the conclusion of the regular season, these teams win their respective regional shields. (S) : URC Shield champion

=== Round 1 ===
20 September 2024	(1 BP) Cardiff (Wales)	22–17	(Italy) Zebre Parma (1 BP)	Cardiff Arms Park, Cardiff
19:35	Try: Winnett 9' c Stephens 18' m D. Thomas 23' m McNally 56' m Con: Sheedy 10' (1/4)	Report	Try: Bertaccini 64' c Locatelli 81' c Con: Da Re (2/2) 65', 82'; Pen: Montemauri 8'	Attendance: 6,291; Referee: Eoghan Cross (Ireland)

=== Round 2 ===
28 September 2024	(1 BP) Zebre Parma (Italy)	42–33	(Ireland) Munster (1 BP)	Stadio Sergio Lanfranchi, Parma
16:00	Try: Trulla (2) 22' m, 41' m Fusco (2) 26' c, 59' c Licata 51' c Prisciantelli 62' m Con: Montemauri (3/6) 27', 52' 60'; Pen: Montemauri 11'; Da Re 80'	Report	Try: Coombes (2) 19' c, 30' c Haley 33' c Fitzgerald 40' c McCarthy 76' m Con: Butler (4/5) 20', 31', 34', 41'	Attendance: 2,300; Referee: Hollie Davidson (Scotland)

=== Round 3 ===
5 October 2024	Zebre Parma (Italy)	5–36	(South Africa) Stormers (1 BP)	Stadio Sergio Lanfranchi, Parma
20:35	Try: Gesi 75' m	Report	Try: Zas 40' c, 72' m Hartzenberg 59' m Davids 78'; Con: Matthee 41'; Willemse 79'; Pen: Matthee (4) 2', 23', 27', 43'	Attendance: 1,867; Referee: Chris Busby (Ireland)

=== Round 4 ===
11 October 2024	(1 BP) Glasgow Warriors (Scotland)	33–3	(Italy) Zebre Parma	Scotstoun Stadium, Glasgow
19:35	Try: Matthews 13' c Dobie 17' c Jones (2) 33' c, 52' c Stewart 60' m Con: Hastings (4/5) 14', 18', 34', 52'	Report	Pen: Da Re (1/1) 27'	Attendance: 6,499; Referee: Griffin Colby (South Africa)

=== Round 5 ===
19 October 2024	(1 BP) Zebre Parma (Italy)	9–10	(South Africa) Lions	Stadio Sergio Lanfranchi, Parma
13:30	Try: Montemauri (3/4) 14', 21', 46'	Report	Try: van der Merwe 27' c Con: Nohamba (1/1) 28'; Pen: Nohamba (1/2) 42'	Attendance: 1,187; Referee: Ben Connor, Wales

=== Round 6 ===
25 October 2024	(1 BP) Scarlets (Wales)	30–8	(Italy) Zebre Parma	Parc y Scarlets, Llanelli
19:35	Try: Rogers 27'm Page 42' m Murray 46' c Macleod 56' c Con: Lloyd (2/4) 44', 58'; Pen: Lloyd (2) 4', 23'	Report	Try: Cambriani 8' m Drop: Prisciantelli 5'	Attendance: 5,892; Referee: Morné Ferreira, South Africa

=== Round 7 ===
30 November 2024	Zebre Parma (Italy)	22–17	(Wales) Ospreys (1 BP)	Stadio Sergio Lanfranchi, Parma
20:35	Try: Gesi (2) 6' c, 25' m Trulla 43' c Con: Da Re (2/3) 7', 44'; Pen: Da Re 57'	Report	Try: Kasende 18' c Lloyd 72' m Con: O. Williams (1/2) 19', 73'; Pen: O. Williams 39'	Attendance: 2,395; Referee: Ian Kenny (Scotland)

=== Round 8 ===
21 December 2024	Benetton (Italy)	11–10	(Italy) Zebre Parma (1 BP)	Stadio Monigo, Treviso
14:00	Try: Marin 29' m Pen: Marin 58'; Smith 81'	Report	Try: Zambonin 71' c Con: Da Re 72'; Pen: Da Re 37'	Attendance: 5,000; Referee: Federico Vedovelli (ITA)

=== Round 9 ===
28 December 2024	Zebre Parma (Italy)	12-24	(Italy) Benetton (1 BP)	Stadio Sergio Lanfranchi, Parma
16:00	Try: Fischetti 19' c Gesi 47' m Con: Da Re (1/2) 21'	Report	Try: Maile (2) 24' m, 36' m Brex 65' c Marin 85' c Con: Smith (2/4) 66', 86'	Attendance: 5,000

=== Round 10 ===
26 January 2025	(1 BP) Ulster (Ireland)	14–15	(Italy) Zebre Parma	Ravenhill Stadium, Belfast
17:30	Try: Barrett (2) 56' c, 75' c Con: Doak (2/2) 56', 76'	Report	Try: Stavile 46' m Da Re 49' c Con: Montemauri (1/2) 50'; Pen: Montemauri 28'	Attendance: 11,792

=== Round 11 ===
14 February 2025	(1 BP) Edinburgh (Scotland)	17-22	(Italy) Zebre Parma	Hive Stadium, Edinburgh
19:35	Try: McCann 11’ Tuipulotu 55’c Crosbie 68’ Con: Thompson	Report	Try: Trulla 6’ Garcia 24’c di Bartolomeo 63’c Con: da Re (2); Pen: da Re 47'	Attendance: 5,484

=== Round 12 ===
28 February 2025	(1BP) Zebre Parma (Italy)	31-21	(Wales) Dragons	Stadio Sergio Lanfranchi, Parma
20:35	Try: Licata, 15'c Stavile, 39'c Prisciantelli, 41'c Paea, 59'c Con: da Re (4); Pen: Prisciantelli, 79'	Report	Try: Coghlan, 12'c, 25'c Westwood, 29'c Con: Reed (3)	Attendance: 2,348

=== Round 13 ===
22 March 2025	(1 BP) Sharks (South Africa)	35-34	(Italy) Zebre Parma (2 BP)	Kings Park Stadium, Durban
14:45	Try: Kolisi, 3'c, 31'c Julius, 11'c Koch, 36'c Hooker, 74'c Con: Hendrikse (5)	Report	Try: Gesi, 13'c Ferrari, 22'c Prisciantelli, 46'c, 49'c Con: Montemauri (4); Pen: Montemauri, 29', 52'	Attendance: 9,935

=== Round 14 ===
29 March 2025	(1 BP) Bulls (South Africa)	63-24	(Italy) Zebre Parma	Loftus Versfeld Stadium, Pretoria
14:45	Try: Petersen, 3', 73'; Burger, 13'; Jacobs, 30'; Wessels, 36' v. Staden, 47'; Coetzee, 59'; Vorster, 65'; Kriel, 75'; Con: Johannes, 4', 14', 31', 37', 48', 60', 66'; Chamberlain, 74', 76'	Report:ESPN	Try: Trulla, 20'; Montemauri, 41'; Bartolomeo, 57'; Con: Montemauri, 20', 41'; Da Re, 58'; Drop: Alessandro Fusco, 27'	Attendance: 7,673

=== Round 15 ===
19 April 2025	Zebre Parma (Italy)	6 - 14	(Scotland) Glasgow Warriors	Stadio Sergio Lanfranchi, Parma
20:35	Pen: da Re, 8', 31'	Report	Try: McKay, 43'; McDowall, 52'; Con: Jordan, 44', 52'	Attendance: 2,067

=== Round 16 ===
25 April 2025	Zebre Parma (Italy)	25 – 25	(Scotland) Edinburgh	Stadio Sergio Lanfranchi, Parma
20:35	Try: Fusco, 27', 38'; Trulla, 40'; Con: da Re, 29', 42'; Pen: Montemauri, 73', 79'	Report, 2	Try: Venter, 53', 63; Currie. 80'; Con: Thompson, 64'; Scott, 81'; Pen: Thompson, 22', 24'	Attendance: 2,568; Referee: Ben Connor

=== Round 17 ===
10 May 2025	(1 BP) Leinster (Ireland)	76–5	(Italy) Zebre Parma	Aviva Stadium, Dublin
17:15	Try: Kelleher, 3'; McGrath, 5'; Baird, 18'; Barrett, 25', 30'; Lowe, 40'; Prendergast, 43' v.d. Flier, 48'; J Osborne, 55', 80'; Frawley, 60'; Culhane, 76'; Con: Prendergast, 4', 19', 26', 30', 44', 50'; Frawley, 76', 80+1'	Report	Try: Garcia, 66	Attendance: 14,681

=== Round 18 ===
17 May 2025	Zebre Parma (Italy)	12 –22	(Ireland) Connacht	Stadio Sergio Lanfranchi, Parma
18:00	Try: Stavile, 37'; Trulla, 70'; Con: Montemauri, 38'	Report	Try: Prendergast, 17'; Bolton, 28'; Hurley-Langton, 61'; Con: Hanrahan, 18', 61'; Pen: Hanrahan, 79'	Attendance: 3,931

== European Challenge Cup ==
Zebre Parma finished bottom of their Challenge Cup pool, and failed to advance to the knockout stages.

EPCR Challenge Cup Pool 1
Pos	Team	Pld	W	D	L	PF	PA	PD	TF	TA	TB	LB	Pts	Qualification
1	(Ireland) Connacht (1)	4	4	0	0	154	73	+81	25	10	4	0	20	Home round of 16
2	(France) Lyon (5)	4	3	0	1	150	118	+32	21	19	2	0	14	Home round of 16
3	(France) Perpignan (8)	4	2	1	1	100	92	+8	12	14	1	0	11	Home round of 16
4	(Wales) Cardiff (16)	4	1	0	3	91	98	−7	13	13	2	1	7	Away round of 16
5	(South Africa) Cheetahs	4	1	1	2	73	132	−59	10	19	0	0	6	
6	(Italy) Zebre Parma	4	0	0	4	70	125	−55	10	17	0	2	2	

Source: EPCR
Rules for classification: Tiebreakers for teams tied on points: 1) Number of matches won; 2) Difference between points for and against; 3) Total number of points for; 4) Aggregate number of points scored in matches between tied teams; 5) Number of matches won excluding the first match, then the second and so on until the tie is settled.

Pool matches

=== Round 1 ===
7 December 2024
20:00

(1 BP) Connacht (Ireland)	43–12	(Italy) Zebre Parma
Try: Mullins (3) 22' m, 28' c, 62' m Tierney-Martin 34' m Boyle (2) 42' c, 80' c Cordero 70' c Con: Carty (2/4) 29', 43'; Naughton (2/3) 71', 80'	Report	Try: Stavile 6' m Fusco 75' c Con: Da Re (1/2) 76'

The Sportsground, Galway
Attendance: 2,672
Referee: Adam Jones (Wales)

=== Round 2 ===
14 December 2024
14:00

(1 BP) Zebre Parma (Italy)	19–21	(France) Lyon
Try: Di Bartolomeo 24' m Prisciantelli 45' c Nasove 68' c Con: Prisciantelli (2/3) 46', 69'	Report	Try: González 19' c Ioane 64' c Saghinadze 71' c Con: Meliande (3/3) 20', 65', 72'

Stadio Sergio Lanfranchi, Parma
Attendance: 1,450
Referee: Ben Breakspear (Wales)

=== Round 3 ===
12 January 2025
14:00

Cheetahs (South Africa)	22–18	(Italy) Zebre Parma (1 BP)
Try: Annies 2' c Rudolph 35' c Jasper 80' m Con: Wentzel (2/3) 3', 36'; Pen: Wentzel (1/3) 27'	Report	Try: Gesi 22' m Di Bartolomeo 44' c Con: Dominguez (1/2) 45'; Pen: Dominguez (2/4) 1', 31'

NRCA Stadium, Amsterdam
Attendance: 2,500
Referee: Peter Martin (Ireland)

=== Round 4 ===
19 January 2025
16:15

Zebre Parma (Italy)	21–39	(France) Perpignan (1 BP)
Try: Gregory 35' c Licata 52' c Nasove 66' c Con: Dominguez (2/2) 36', 53'; Montemauri (1/1) 66'	Report	Try: Buliruarua 19' m Naqalevu (2) 56' c, 71' c Toganiyadrava 74' m Con: Aucagne (2/4) 57', 72'; Pen: Aucagne (5/5) 8', 15', 28', 51', 80'

Stadio Sergio Lanfranchi, Parma
Attendance: 1,817
Referee: Eoghan Cross (Ireland)

== Home attendance ==
End of season

Domestic League						EPRC Challenge Cup						Total	
League	Fixtures	Total Attendance	Average Attendance	Highest	Lowest	League	Fixtures	Total Attendance	Average Attendance	Highest	Lowest	Total Attendance	Average Attendance
2024–25 United Rugby Championship	9	23,663	2,630	5,000	1,187	2024–25 European Rugby Challenge Cup	2	3,267	1,634	1,817	1,450	26,930	2,448
