= 2026–27 Zebre Parma season =

Zebre
- 2026–27 season
- Head coach: Massimo Brunello
- President: Giovanni Fava

The 2026–27 season is Zebre Parma's sixth season in the United Rugby Championship, and in all formats of the competition. Along with competing in the URC and its Scottish-Italian Shield competition, the club will also participate in the 2026–27 EPCR Challenge Cup.

== Squad and management ==
=== Players in ===
- (Italy) Alex Mattioli from (France) Racing 92
- (Italy) Pietro Turrisi from (France) Racing 92
- (Italy) Jacopo Botturi from (Italy) Petrarca Padova
- (Argentina) Francisco Minervino from (Italy) Petrarca Padova
- (Italy) Sergio Pelliccioli from (Italy) Petrarca Padova
- (Italy) Lorenzo Citton from (Italy) Petrarca Padova
- (Italy) Tommaso Allan from (France) Perpignan
- (Argentina) Patricio Baronio from (Italy) Viadana
- (Italy) Leonardo Sodo Migliori from (Italy) Fiamme Oro
- (South Africa) Zane Bester from (South Africa) Griquas (season-long loan)
- (Argentina) Tobías Wade from (Argentina) Alumni

=== Players out ===
- (Argentina) Enrique Pieretto to (France) Agen
- (Italy) Enrico Lucchin (retired)
- (Italy) Luca Morisi (retired)
- (Italy) Albert Batista to (Italy) Rugby Viadana
- (United States) Shilo Klein (released)
- (Argentina) Martin Roger Farias (released)
- (Argentina) Gonzalo Garcia to (France) Pau
- (Italy) Malik Faissal to (England) Northampton Saints
- (Romania) Iacopo Bianchi to (Italy) Rovigo Delta
- (Argentina) Guido Volpi to (Italy) Viadana
- (Italy) Ion Neculai to (England) Northampton Saints
- (Italy) Matteo Nocera to (France) Lyon
- (Italy) Lorenzo Pani from (Italy) Zebre Parma

2026–27 Zebre Parma squad
**Props**: (Italy) **Paolo Buonfiglio**; (Italy) Luca Franceschetto; (Italy) **Muhamed Hasa**; (Italy) Sergio Pelliccioli; (Argentina) Juan Pitinari *; (Italy) **Luca Rizzoli**; **Hookers**: (Italy) **Tommaso Di Bartolomeo**; (Argentina) Francisco Minervino *; (Italy) Giovanni Quattrini; (Italy) Giampietro Ribaldi; **Locks**: (Italy) **Matteo Canali**; (Argentina) Franco Carrera; (Italy) Leonard Krumov; (Italy) Alex Mattioli; (Italy) Francesco Ruffolo; (Italy) Pietro Turrisi	**Back row**: (Italy) Jacopo Botturi; (Italy) Giacomo Ferrari; (Italy) **Giovanni Licata** **(c)**; (Italy) **Samuele Locatelli**; (Italy) **David Odiase**; (Italy) **Alessandro Ortombina**; (Italy) Davide Ruggeri; (Argentina) Bautista Stavile *; **Scrum-halves**: (Argentina) Patricio Baronio *; (Italy) Lorenzo Citton; (Argentina) Thomas Dominguez *; (Italy) **Alessandro Fusco**; **Fly-halves**: (Italy) **Giacomo Da Re**; (Italy) Giovanni Montemauri	**Centres**: (Italy) **Giulio Bertaccini**; (South Africa) Zane Bester; (Italy) Damiano Mazza; (Italy) **Marco Zanon**; **Wings**: (Italy) **Mirko Belloni**; (Italy) **Simone Gesi**; (Italy) Leonardo Sodo Migliori; (Italy) **Jacopo Trulla**; **Fullbacks**: (Italy) **Tommaso Allan**; (Argentina) Tobías Wade
**(c)** denotes the team captain. **Bold** denotes internationally capped players. * denotes players qualified to play for Italy on residency or dual nationality. Taking into account signings and departures ahead of 2026–27 season as listed on List of 2025–26 United Rugby Championship transfers. Source:

=== Additional players ===
2026–27 Zebre Parma additional players
**Props**: (Italy) **Filippo Alongi** (Note: Additional player from Valorugby Emilia); (Argentina) Octavio Barbatti (Note: Additional player from Petrarca Padova)*; (Argentina) Juan Barbotti (Note: Additional player from Rugby Calvisano)*; (Argentina) Juan Ignacio Castellano (Note: Additional player from Rugby Parabiago)*; (Italy) Federico Pisani (Note: Additional player from Petrarca Padova); **Locks**: (Italy) Simone Invernizzi (Note: Additional player from FIR Academy)	**Back row**: (Italy) Matteo Sebastiani (Note: Additional player from FIR Academy); **Scrum halves**: (South Africa) Migael Prinsloo (Note: Additional player from Valorugby Emilia)*; **Fly-halves**: (Italy) Francesco Alderighi (Note: Additional player from FIR Academy)	**Centres**: (Italy) Riccardo Casarin (Note: Additional player from Valorugby Emilia); (Italy) Massimo Molina (Note: Additional player from FIR Academy); (Italy) Dewi Passarella (Note: Additional player from Petrarca Padova); **Wings**: (Italy) Manuel Scappini (Note: Additional player from FIR Academy)
**(c)** denotes the team captain. **Bold** denotes internationally capped players. * denotes players qualified to play for Italy on residency or dual nationality. Taking into account signings and departures ahead of 2025–26 season as listed on List of 2026–27 United Rugby Championship transfers. Source:

== United Rugby Championship ==
=== Matches ===
Zebre will begin their sixth URC campaign at home to Bulls from South Africa.

26 September	Zebre (Italy)	13–47	(South Africa) Bulls (1 BP)	Stadio Sergio Lanfranchi
	Try: Fusco 58' c Con: Allan (1/1) 59'; Pen: Allan (2) 14', 30'; Cards: Canali (yellow card) 26'; Pelliccioli (yellow card) 81'	Report; Scorecard; Highlights	Try: Ludwig (2) 31' c, 78' de Wet 38' c Ruan Vermaak 43' c Harold Vorster 51' c Zak Burger 83' m Con: Bosch (4/4) 32', 39', 43', 52' le Roux (1/2) 79' c Cards: Rudolph (yellow card) 77'	Attendance: 2,498; Referee: Andrew Brace

2 October	(1 BP) Cardiff (Wales)	40–27	(Italy) Zebre (1 BP)	Cardiff Arms Park
	Try: T Williams 9' m Sebastien 18' c Basham 27' c Mann 36' c Bowen (2) 43' c, 54' c Con: Sheedy (4/5) 19', 27', 37', 44'; J Evans (1/1) 54'	Report; Scorecard; Highlights	Try: Minervino 21' m Ferrari 59' c Bertaccini 64' m Da Re 69' c Con: Da Re (2/4) 59', 70'; Pen: Allan 6'	Attendance: 7,231; Referee: Morné Ferreira (South Africa)

10 October	Zebre (Italy)	12–29	(Scotland) Edinburgh (1 BP)	Stadio Sergio Lanfranchi
	Try: Fusco 12' m Ferrari 72' c Con: Allan (1/2) 72'; Cards: Fusco (yellow card) 36'	Report; Scorecard; Highlights	Try: M Currie 30' c Douglas 37' m Bradbury 56' c T Currie 80' c Con: Grayson (3/4) 30', 56', 81'; Pen: Grayson 6'; Cards: Satala-Navlivou (yellow card) 8'; Morris (yellow card) 61'	Attendance: 2,305; Referee: Adam Jones (Wales)

23 October	(1 BP) Connacht (Ireland)	48–27	(Italy) Zebre (1 BP)	The Sportsground, Galway
	Try: Bealham 9' c Jansen 14' m Forde 18' c Gilbert 23' c Prendergast 31' c Heffernan (2) 55' m, 80' m West 68' m Con: Frawley (4/6) 9', 19', 24', 31'	Report; Scorecard; Highlights	Try: Giacomo Ferrari 5' m Jacopo Botturi 28' c Mirko Belloni 33' m Giampietro Ribaldi 71' m Bautista Stavile 77' m Con: Giovanni Montemauri (1/3) 29'	Attendance: 5,897; Referee: Hanru van Rooyen (South Africa)

31 October 2026	Dragons (Wales)	v	(Italy) Zebre	Rodney Parade, Newport

5 December 2026	Zebre (Italy)	v	(Ireland) Munster	Stadio Sergio Lanfranchi

19 December 2026	Zebre (Italy)	v	(Italy) Benetton	Stadio Sergio Lanfranchi

27 December 2026	Benetton (Italy)	v	(Italy) Zebre	Stadio Monigo, Treviso

2 January 2027	Zebre (Italy)	v	(Scotland) Glasgow Warriors	Stadio Sergio Lanfranchi

23 January 2027	Lions (South Africa)	v	(Italy) Zebre	Ellis Park Stadium, Jo'burg

30 January 2027	Stormers (South Africa)	v	(Italy) Zebre	Cape Town Stadium

27 February 2027	Zebre (Italy)	v	(Wales) Scarlets	Stadio Sergio Lanfranchi

20 March 2027	Ulster (Ireland)	v	(Italy) Zebre	Ravenhill Stadium, Belfast

26 March 2027	Glasgow Warriors (Scotland)	v	(Italy) Zebre	Scotstoun Stadium

17 April 2027	Zebre (Italy)	v	(South Africa) Sharks	Stadio Sergio Lanfranchi

23 April 2027	Zebre (Italy)	v	(Wales) Ospreys	Stadio Sergio Lanfranchi

7 May 2027	Edinburgh (Scotland)	v	(Italy) Zebre	Edinburgh Rugby Stadium

15 May 2027	Zebre (Italy)	v	(Ireland) Leinster	Stadio Sergio Lanfranchi

=== Standings ===
Pos	Team	Pld	W	D	L	PF	PA	PD	TF	TA	TB	LB	Pts	Qualification
1	Glasgow Warriors	5	4	1	0	148	112	+36	22	15	5	0	23	Qualification for the Champions Cup and knockout stage
2	Bulls	5	4	0	1	214	106	+108	31	15	4	1	21	Qualification for the Champions Cup and knockout stage
3	Stormers	5	4	0	1	166	101	+65	24	14	4	1	21	Qualification for the Champions Cup and knockout stage
4	Sharks	5	4	0	1	140	107	+33	20	16	3	0	19	Qualification for the Champions Cup and knockout stage
5	Edinburgh	5	4	0	1	123	95	+28	17	12	3	0	19	Qualification for the Champions Cup and knockout stage
6	Leinster	5	3	0	2	149	81	+68	23	11	4	2	18	Qualification for the Champions Cup and knockout stage
7	Cardiff	5	3	0	2	113	107	+6	17	17	2	0	14	Qualification for the Champions Cup and knockout stage
8	Dragons	5	2	1	2	137	128	+9	20	20	3	1	14	Qualification for the Champions Cup and knockout stage
9	Ospreys	5	2	0	3	112	147	−35	18	21	3	0	11	Qualification for the Challenge Cup
10	Benetton	5	1	1	3	115	104	+11	16	17	2	3	11	Qualification for the Challenge Cup
11	Connacht	5	2	0	3	109	161	−52	18	24	2	0	10	Qualification for the Challenge Cup
12	Munster	5	1	1	3	93	113	−20	12	17	2	2	10	Qualification for the Challenge Cup
13	Lions	5	2	0	3	107	162	−55	15	25	1	0	9	Qualification for the Challenge Cup
14	Scarlets	5	1	0	4	134	191	−57	20	29	4	1	9	Qualification for the Challenge Cup
15	Ulster	5	0	2	3	121	160	−39	18	22	4	1	9	Qualification for the Challenge Cup
16	Zebre	5	0	0	5	93	199	−106	14	30	2	0	2	Qualification for the Challenge Cup

Updated to match(es) played on 2nd November 2026. Source: UnitedRugby.com
Rules for classification: Tiebreakers for teams tied on points: 1) Number of matches won 2) The difference between points for and points against 3) The number of tries scored 4) The most points scored 5) The difference between tries for and tries against 6) The fewest red cards received 7) The fewest yellow cards received.

=== URC Scottish Italian Shield ===
2026–27 United Rugby Championship Regional Shield tables
(Italy) (Scotland) Italian x Scottish Shield
	Team	P	W	D	L	PF	PA	PD	TF	TA	TBP	LBP	Pts	Pos overall
1	(Italy) Benetton	2	1	0	1	51	36	+15	6	6	1	1	6	10
2	(Scotland) Glasgow Warriors	1	1	0	0	24	20	+4	4	2	1	0	5	1
3	(Scotland) Edinburgh	2	1	0	1	41	43	–2	6	6	1	0	5	5
4	(Italy) Zebre Parma	1	0	0	1	12	29	–17	2	4	0	0	0	16
If teams are level at any stage, tiebreakers are applied in the following order: 1. number of matches won 2. the difference between points for and points against 3. the number of tries scored 4. the most points scored 5. the difference between tries for and tries against 6. the fewest red cards received 7. the fewest yellow cards received
Green background indicates teams currently leading the regional shield. Upon the conclusion of the regular season, these teams win their respective regional shields. (S) : URC Shield champion

== EPCR Challenge Cup ==
EPCR Challenge Cup Pool 1
Pos	Team	Pld	W	D	L	PF	PA	PD	TF	TA	TB	LB	Pts	Qualification
1	(Ireland) Ulster	1	1	0	0	40	21	+19	6	3	1	0	5	Home round of 16
2	(Wales) Dragons	1	1	0	0	29	14	+15	4	2	0	0	4	Home round of 16
3	(France) Bayonne	1	1	0	0	29	27	+2	5	3	0	0	4	Home round of 16
4	(South Africa) Cheetahs	1	0	0	1	27	29	−2	3	5	0	1	1	Away round of 16
5	(France) Perpignan	1	0	0	1	14	29	−15	2	4	0	0	0	
6	(Italy) Zebre Parma	1	0	0	1	21	40	−19	3	6	0	0	0	

First match(es) will be played: 16 October 2026. Source: EPCR
Rules for classification: Tiebreakers for teams tied on points: 1) Number of matches won; 2) Difference between points for and against; 3) Total number of points for; 4) Aggregate number of points scored in matches between tied teams; 5) Number of matches won excluding the first match, then the second and so on until the tie is settled.
