= 2025 Italy rugby union tour of Namibia and South Africa =

- Date: 27 June – 12 July 2025
- Coach: Gonzalo Quesada
- Tour captain(s): Giacomo Nicotera, Niccolò Cannone
- Top test point scorer: Giacomo Da Re (21)
- Top test try scorer: Jacopo Trulla (3)
Summary
P	W	D	L
Test match
3	1	0	2
Opponent
P	W	D	L
Namibia
1	1	0	0
South Africa
2	0	0	2

Tour chronology
- ← Pacific and Japan 2024

In July 2025, the Italy national rugby union team toured South Africa as part of the Summer International calendar. The two-test tour was confirmed in October 2024, with a match against Namibia being included on the tour.

It was Italy's third tour of South Africa, and the first time both teams have played each other at Loftus Versfeld Stadium and Nelson Mandela Bay Stadium.

== Schedule ==
Date	Venue	Home	Score	Away
27 June 2025	Hage Geingob Rugby Stadium, Windhoek	Namibia	6–73	Italy
5 July 2025	Loftus Versfeld Stadium, Pretoria	South Africa	42–24	Italy
12 July 2025	Nelson Mandela Bay Stadium, Gqeberha	South Africa	45–0	Italy

== Venues ==
Namibia	South Africa	
Windhoek	Pretoria	Gqeberha
Hage Geingob Rugby Stadium	Loftus Versfeld Stadium	Nelson Mandela Bay Stadium
Capacity: 10,000	Capacity: 51,762	Capacity: 46,000
Test series venues: Namibia; 1 Hage Geingob Rugby Stadium, Windhoek; South Africa; 2 Loftus Versfeld Stadium, Pretoria; 3 Nelson Mandela Bay Stadium, Gqeberha

== Squad ==
On May 21, Italy named a 33-player squad for the tour.

On June 11 Louis Lynagh replaced Monty Ioane. On June 23 Simone Ferrari replaced Giosuè Zilocchi. On June 27 it was announced that Federico Mori will not join the tour, due to injury. On June 30, Pietro Ceccarelli and Damiano Mazza were added to the squad in substitution of Marco Riccioni and Leonardo Marin, who were both injured in the first match against Namibia. On July 4, Leonard Krumov joined the team in South Africa in substitution of injured Riccardo Favretto. On July 7, Giampietro Ribaldi was called to replace Giacomo Nicotera.

- Ages and caps updated at the start of the tour.

Player	Position	Date of birth (age)	Caps	Club/province
Tommaso Di Bartolomeo	Hooker	4 January 2001 (aged 24)	0	(Italy) Zebre Parma
Pablo Dimcheff	Hooker	1 July 1999 (aged 25)	0	(France) Colomiers
Giacomo Nicotera (c)	Hooker	15 July 1996 (aged 28)	33	(France) Stade Français
Giampietro Ribaldi	Hooker	12 March 1997 (aged 28)	0	(Italy) Zebre Parma
Pietro Ceccarelli	Prop	16 February 1992 (aged 33)	34	(France) Perpignan
Simone Ferrari	Prop	28 March 1994 (aged 31)	64	(Italy) Benetton
Danilo Fischetti	Prop	26 January 1998 (aged 27)	52	(Italy) Zebre Parma
Muhamed Hasa	Prop	10 September 2001 (aged 23)	0	(Italy) Zebre Parma
Marco Riccioni	Prop	19 October 1997 (aged 27)	33	(England) Saracens
Mirco Spagnolo	Prop	2 January 2001 (aged 24)	14	(Italy) Benetton
Matteo Canali	Lock	11 September 1998 (aged 26)	0	(Italy) Zebre Parma
Niccolò Cannone	Lock	17 May 1998 (aged 27)	52	(Italy) Benetton
Riccardo Favretto	Lock	18 October 2001 (aged 23)	6	(Italy) Benetton
Leonard Krumov	Lock	1 May 1996 (aged 29)	0	(Italy) Zebre Parma
Andrea Zambonin	Lock	3 September 2000 (aged 24)	9	(Italy) Zebre Parma
Lorenzo Cannone	Back row	28 January 2001 (aged 24)	28	(Italy) Benetton
Alessandro Izekor	Back row	5 March 2000 (aged 25)	4	(Italy) Benetton
Sebastian Negri	Back row	30 June 1994 (aged 30)	63	(Italy) Benetton
David Odiase	Back row	19 January 2003 (aged 22)	0	(France) Oyonnax
Ross Vintcent	Back row	5 June 2002 (aged 23)	14	(England) Exeter Chiefs
Manuel Zuliani	Back row	26 April 2000 (aged 25)	32	(Italy) Benetton
Alessandro Fusco	Scrum-half	28 October 1999 (aged 25)	18	(Italy) Zebre Parma
Alessandro Garbisi	Scrum-half	11 April 2002 (aged 23)	16	(Italy) Benetton
Stephen Varney	Scrum-half	15 May 2001 (aged 24)	32	(France) Vannes
Giacomo Da Re	Fly-half	29 March 1999 (aged 26)	2	(Italy) Zebre Parma
Giovanni Montemauri	Fly-half	24 October 2000 (aged 24)	0	(Italy) Zebre Parma
Giulio Bertaccini	Centre	29 November 2000 (aged 24)	1	(Italy) Zebre Parma
Damiano Mazza	Centre	16 February 1999 (aged 26)	0	(Italy) Zebre Parma
Leonardo Marin	Centre	23 February 2002 (aged 23)	14	(Italy) Benetton
Tommaso Menoncello	Centre	20 August 2002 (aged 22)	28	(Italy) Benetton
Marco Zanon	Centre	3 October 1997 (aged 27)	17	(Italy) Benetton
Simone Gesi	Wing	23 May 2001 (aged 24)	3	(Italy) Zebre Parma
Louis Lynagh	Wing	3 December 2000 (aged 24)	5	(Italy) Benetton
Paolo Odogwu	Wing	18 February 1997 (aged 28)	6	(Italy) Benetton
Jacopo Trulla	Fullback	5 July 2000 (aged 24)	14	(Italy) Zebre Parma
Mirko Belloni	Fullback	4 June 2004 (aged 21)	0	(Italy) Rovigo Delta

== Matches ==
=== Namibia vs Italy ===
27 June 2025
15:00 CAT (UTC+02)

Namibia	6–73	Italy
Pen: Swanepoel (2/2) 7', 16'	Report	Try: Penalty try (2) 5', 80+3'; Trulla (3) 18' m, 40+2' c, 75' c Marin 23' c Gesi 32' c Menoncello 38' c Fusco 45' c Spagnolo 63' m Varney 70' c Con: Da Re (6/8) 24', 33', 39', 43', 46', 71'; Varney (1/1) 76'

Hage Geingob Rugby Stadium, Windhoek
Attendance: 2,000
Referee: Andrew Brace (Ireland)

FB	15	André van den Berg
RW	14	Danie van der Merwe
OC	13	Alcino Izaacs	(substituted off) 56'
IC	12	Danco Burger
LW	11	Jurgen Meyer
FH	10	Tiaan Swanepoel
SH	9	Jacques Theron	(substituted off) 72'
N8	8	Adriaan Booysen	(substituted off) 9'	(substituted on) 17'	(substituted off) 60'
OF	7	Max Katjijeko
BF	6	Prince !Gaoseb (c)
RL	5	Johan Retief	(substituted off) 72'
LL	4	Adriaan Ludick	(substituted off) 47'
TP	3	Aranos Coetzee	(substituted off) 60'
HK	2	Louis van der Westhuizen	(yellow card) 4'	(substituted off) 56'
LP	1	Haitembu Shikufa	(substituted off) 60'
Substitutions:
HK	16	Armand Combrinck	(substituted on) 9'	(substituted off) 17'	(substituted on) 56'
PR	17	Jason Benade	(substituted on) 60'
PR	18	Sidney Halupé	(substituted on) 60'
LK	19	Ruan Ludick	(substituted on) 72'
FL	20	Johan Luttig	(substituted on) 47'
FL	21	Peter Diergaardt	(substituted on) 72'
SH	22	Oela Blaauw	(substituted on) 60'
WG	23	Quiren Madjiedt	(substituted on) 56'
Coach:
Jacques Burger

FB	15	Jacopo Trulla
RW	14	Paolo Odogwu	(substituted off) 71'
OC	13	Tommaso Menoncello
IC	12	Leonardo Marin	(substituted off) 44'
LW	11	Simone Gesi
FH	10	Giacomo Da Re
SH	9	Alessandro Fusco	(substituted off) 54'
N8	8	Ross Vintcent
OF	7	Manuel Zuliani	(substituted off) 60'
BF	6	Sebastian Negri
RL	5	Riccardo Favretto	(substituted off) 54'
LL	4	Niccolò Cannone
TP	3	Marco Riccioni	(substituted off) 5'
HK	2	Giacomo Nicotera (c)	(substituted off) 54'
LP	1	Danilo Fischetti	(substituted off) 54'
Substitutions:
HK	16	Tommaso Di Bartolomeo	(substituted on) 54'
PR	17	Mirco Spagnolo	(substituted on) 54'
PR	18	Muhamed Hasa	(substituted on) 5'
LK	19	Andrea Zambonin	(substituted on) 54'
FL	20	Lorenzo Cannone	(substituted on) 60'
SH	21	Stephen Varney	(substituted on) 54'
FH	22	Giulio Bertaccini	(substituted on) 44'
WG	23	Mirko Belloni	(substituted on) 71'
Coach:
Gonzalo Quesada

Player of the Match:
Giacomo Da Re (Italy)

Assistant referees:
Morné Ferreira (South Africa)
Aimee Barrett-Theron (South Africa)

Notes:

- This was Italy's largest-ever winning margin in an away Test Match, surpassing the previous 61-point margin set against Portugal during the 1995–1997 FIRA Trophy.
- Sidney Halupé, Jurgen Meyer, Danie van der Merwe (all Namibia), Mirko Belloni, Tommaso Di Bartolomeo and Muhamed Hasa (all Italy) made their international debuts.

=== South Africa vs Italy (first Test) ===
5 July 2025
17:10 SAST (UTC+02)

South Africa	42–24	Italy
Try: Kriel 11' c van den Berg (2) 23' c, 37' c Arendse 30' c Koch 57' c van Staden 73' c Con: Pollard (6/6) 12', 23', 31', 38', 58', 74'	Report	Try: Zuliani 46' c Dimcheff 63' c N. Cannone 68' c Con: Da Re (3/3) 47', 64', 69'; Pen: Da Re (1/1) 28'

Loftus Versfeld Stadium, Pretoria
Attendance: 42,632
Referee: Hollie Davidson (Scotland)

FB	15	Damian Willemse
RW	14	Cheslin Kolbe
OC	13	Jesse Kriel (c)
IC	12	Damian de Allende	(substituted off) 63'
LW	11	Kurt-Lee Arendse
FH	10	Handré Pollard
SH	9	Morné van den Berg	(substituted off) 55'
N8	8	Jasper Wiese	(substituted off) 55'
OF	7	Vincent Tshituka
BF	6	Marco van Staden
RL	5	Lood de Jager	(substituted off) 48'
LL	4	Eben Etzebeth	(substituted off) 48'
TP	3	Wilco Louw	(substituted off) 48'
HK	2	Malcolm Marx	(substituted off) 48'
LP	1	Ox Nché	(substituted off) 48'
Substitutions:
HK	16	Bongi Mbonambi	(substituted on) 48'
PR	17	Jan-Hendrik Wessels	(substituted on) 48'
PR	18	Vincent Koch	(substituted on) 48'
LK	19	RG Snyman	(substituted on) 48'
LK	20	Franco Mostert	(substituted on) 48'
FL	21	Kwagga Smith	(substituted on) 55'
SH	22	Faf de Klerk	(substituted on) 55'
FB	23	Willie le Roux	(substituted on) 63'
Coach:
Rassie Erasmus

FB	15	Jacopo Trulla
RW	14	Louis Lynagh
OC	13	Tommaso Menoncello
IC	12	Marco Zanon
LW	11	Simone Gesi
FH	10	Giacomo Da Re
SH	9	Alessandro Fusco		(substituted off) 55'
N8	8	Lorenzo Cannone	(yellow card) 23'	(substituted off) 48'
OF	7	Manuel Zuliani		(substituted off) 59'
BF	6	Alessandro Izekor	(yellow card) 74'
RL	5	Andrea Zambonin		(substituted off) 62'
LL	4	Niccolò Cannone (c)
TP	3	Simone Ferrari		(substituted off) 31'	(substituted on) 55'
HK	2	Tommaso Di Bartolomeo		(substituted off) 62'
LP	1	Danilo Fischetti		(substituted off) 55'
Substitutions:
HK	16	Pablo Dimcheff		(substituted on) 62'
PR	17	Mirco Spagnolo		(substituted on) 55'
PR	18	Muhamed Hasa		(substituted on) 31'	(substituted off) 55'
LK	19	Matteo Canali		(substituted on) 62'
N8	20	Ross Vintcent		(substituted on) 48'
FL	21	David Odiase		(substituted on) 59'
SH	22	Alessandro Garbisi		(substituted on) 55'
CE	23	Giulio Bertaccini		(substituted on) 77'
Coach:
Gonzalo Quesada

Player of the Match:
Vincent Tshituka (South Africa)

Assistant referees:
Matthew Carley (England)
Andrew Brace (Ireland)
Television match official:
Andrew Jackson (England)
Foul play review officer:
Tual Trainini (France)

Notes:

- Vincent Tshituka (South Africa), Matteo Canali, Pablo Dimcheff and David Odiase (all Italy) made their international debuts.

=== South Africa vs Italy (second Test) ===
12 July 2025
17:10 SAST (UTC+02)

South Africa	45–0	Italy
Try: Williams 8' m van der Merwe (2) 15' m, 31' c Moodie 37' m Marx 50' c Mapimpi 72' c Wessels 80' c Con: Libbok (4/7) 32', 51', 73', 80+1'	Report

Nelson Mandela Bay Stadium, Gqeberha
Attendance: 44,282
Referee: Andrew Brace (Ireland)

FB	15	Willie le Roux		(substituted off) 55'
RW	14	Edwill van der Merwe
OC	13	Canan Moodie		(substituted off) 55'
IC	12	André Esterhuizen
LW	11	Makazole Mapimpi
FH	10	Manie Libbok
SH	9	Grant Williams		(substituted off) 55'
N8	8	Jasper Wiese	(red card) 21'
OF	7	Pieter-Steph du Toit
BF	6	Marco van Staden		(substituted off) 57'
RL	5	Ruan Nortjé
LL	4	Salmaan Moerat (c)		(substituted off) 55'
TP	3	Wilco Louw	(yellow card) 44'	(substituted off) 61'
HK	2	Malcolm Marx		(substituted off) 61'
LP	1	Thomas du Toit		(substituted off) 30'
Substitutions:
HK	16	Jan-Hendrik Wessels		(substituted on) 61'
PR	17	Ox Nché		(substituted on) 30'
PR	18	Asenathi Ntlabakanye		(substituted on) 61'
FL	19	Cobus Wiese		(substituted on) 55'
FL	20	Evan Roos		(substituted on) 57'
SH	21	Cobus Reinach		(substituted on) 55'
FH	22	Sacha Feinberg-Mngomezulu		(substituted on) 55'
CE	23	Ethan Hooker		(substituted on) 55'
Coach:
Rassie Erasmus

FB	15	Mirko Belloni
RW	14	Louis Lynagh
OC	13	Tommaso Menoncello
IC	12	Marco Zanon
LW	11	Jacopo Trulla		(substituted off) 17'
FH	10	Giacomo Da Re
SH	9	Alessandro Garbisi		(substituted off) 68'
N8	8	Ross Vintcent
OF	7	Manuel Zuliani		(substituted off) 70'
BF	6	Sebastian Negri		(substituted off) 59'
RL	5	Andrea Zambonin		(substituted off) 63'
LL	4	Niccolò Cannone (c)
TP	3	Simone Ferrari		(substituted off) 52'
HK	2	Tommaso Di Bartolomeo		(substituted off) 52'
LP	1	Danilo Fischetti	(yellow card) 47'	(substituted off) 63'
Substitutions:
HK	16	Pablo Dimcheff		(substituted on) 52'
PR	17	Mirco Spagnolo		(substituted on) 63'
PR	18	Muhamed Hasa		(substituted on) 52'
LK	19	Matteo Canali		(substituted on) 63'
FL	20	Alessandro Izekor		(substituted on) 59'
FL	21	David Odiase	(yellow card) 74'	(substituted on) 70'
SH	22	Stephen Varney		(substituted on) 68'
CE	23	Giulio Bertaccini		(substituted on) 17'
Coach:
Gonzalo Quesada

Player of the Match:
Edwill van der Merwe (South Africa)

Assistant referees:
Matthew Carley (England)
Hollie Davidson (Scotland)
Television match official:
Tual Trainini (France)
Foul play review officer:
Andrew Jackson (England)

Notes:

- Willie le Roux became the eighth South African to earn 100 Test caps.
- Asenathi Ntlabakanye, Ethan Hooker and Cobus Wiese (all South Africa) made their international debuts.

== See also ==
- 2025 mid-year rugby union tests
