= Mirko Belloni =

Italy international rugby union player (born 2004)

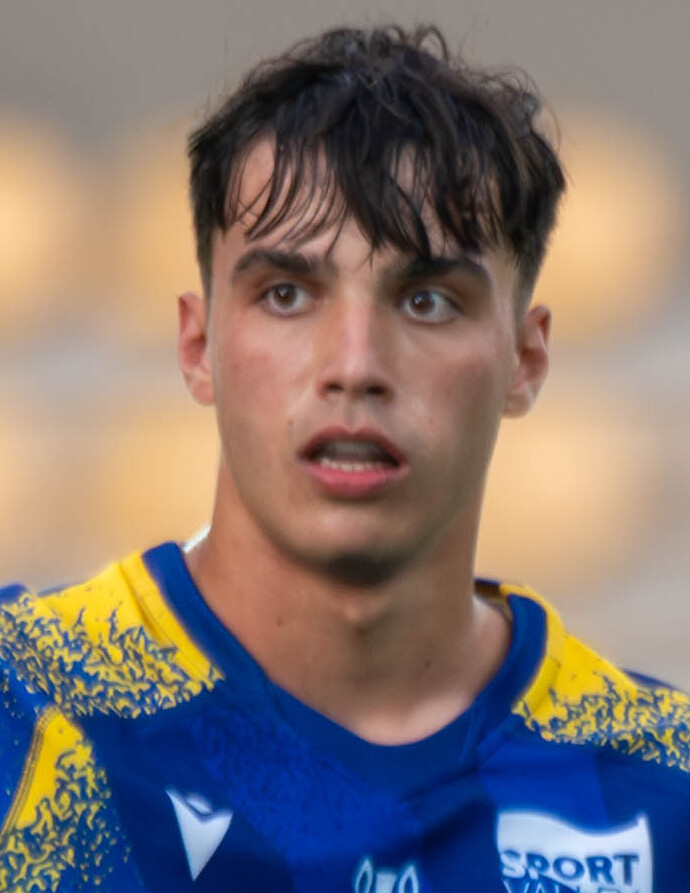
- Born: Mirko Belloni; 4 June 2004 (age 22) Rovigo, Italy
- Height: 1.87 m (6 ft 1 1/2 in)
- Weight: 99 kg (15.6 st; 218 lb)

Rugby union career
- Position: Fullback
- Current team: Zebre Parma
Youth career
- -: Monti Rugby Rovigo Junior
- –: Rugby Verona
Senior career
Years	Team	Apps	(Points)
2022–2024	Rugby Verona		
2024–2025	Rovigo Delta	14	(25)
2025–	Zebre Parma	17	(10)
- Correct as of 9 Aug 2026
International career
Years	Team	Apps	(Points)
2024	Italy U20	10	(10)
2026	Italy XV	2	(5)
2025–	Italy	3	(0)
- Correct as of 27 Nov 2025

Mirko Belloni (born 4 June 2004) is a professional Italian rugby union player, who plays for Zebre Parma in United Rugby Championship. His preferred position is fullback.

== Club career ==
Under contract with Italian Serie A Elite team Rovigo Delta Belloni was named MVP of Serie A Elite 2024–25. Belloni signed for Zebre Parma in June 2025 ahead of the 2025–26 United Rugby Championship. He made his debut in Round 1 of the 2025–26 season against the Edinburgh.

== International career ==
In 2024 he was named in Italy U20s squad for annual Six Nations Under 20s Championship.

On 3 December 2024 he was called in Italy Under 23 squad for test series against Emerging Scotland. On 28 January 2026 he was selected by Massimo Brunello to be part of an Italy XV squad for two official tests against Scotland A and Chile during 2026 men's rugby union internationals window of spring..

He was named to Italy 2025 Six Nations squad as an invited player, but did not play during the championship. He was also called up to participate in 2025 Tour of Namibia and South Africa. He made his debut against Namibia in Windhoek during the first match of the tour.
