= Giacomo Nicotera =

Italy international rugby union player

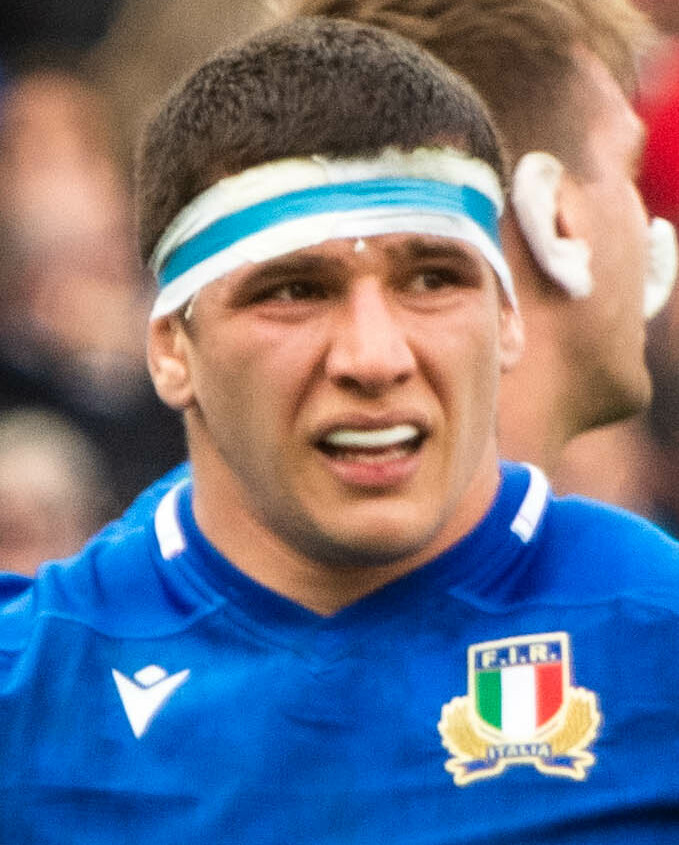
- Nicotera in 2023
- Born: 15 July 1996 (age 30) Trieste, Italy
- Height: 183 cm (6 ft 0 in)
- Weight: 108 kg (238 lb; 17 st 0 lb)

Rugby union career
- Position: Hooker
- Current team: Stade Français Paris
Youth career
- Rugby Trieste 2004
- –: Venjulia Rugby Trieste
- –: Mogliano Rugby
Senior career
Years	Team	Apps	(Points)
2016–2018	Mogliano	36	(15)
2018–2019	San Donà	22	(5)
2019–2021	Rovigo	24	(30)
2020–2022	→Benetton	15	(0)
2022–2024	Benetton	26	(10)
2024–	Stade Français Paris	41	(20)
- Correct as of 16 Sep 2026
International career
Years	Team	Apps	(Points)
2021	Italy A	2	(0)
2022–	Italy	41	(20)
- Correct as of 16 Sep 2026

Giacomo Nicotera (born 15 July 1996) is an Italian professional rugby union player who plays hooker for Stade Français in Top 14.

== Club career ==
Nicotera has previously played for clubs such as Mogliano, San Donà, and Rovigo in the past. Under contract with Top10 side Rovigo Delta, he was named as a Permit Player for Benetton in the 2020–21 Pro14 and 2021–22 United Rugby Championship seasons. He made his Benetton debut in the rearranged Round 4 match of the 2020–21 Pro14 against Connacht. He played for Benetton until 2023–24 United Rugby Championship season.

== International career ==
On 14 October 2021, Nicotera was selected by Alessandro Troncon to be part of an Italy A 28-man squad for the 2021 end-of-year rugby union internationals.
On 13 January 2022, he was selected by Kieran Crowley to be part of an Italy 33-man squad for the 2022 Six Nations Championship. He made his debut against Scotland.

On 22 August 2023, he was named in the Italy's 33-man squad for the 2023 Rugby World Cup.

In 2025 he participated in the 2025 tour of Namibia and South Africa where he was nominated to be the captain for the tour, leading the team for the first time again Namibia.
