= David Odiase =

Italy international rugby union player

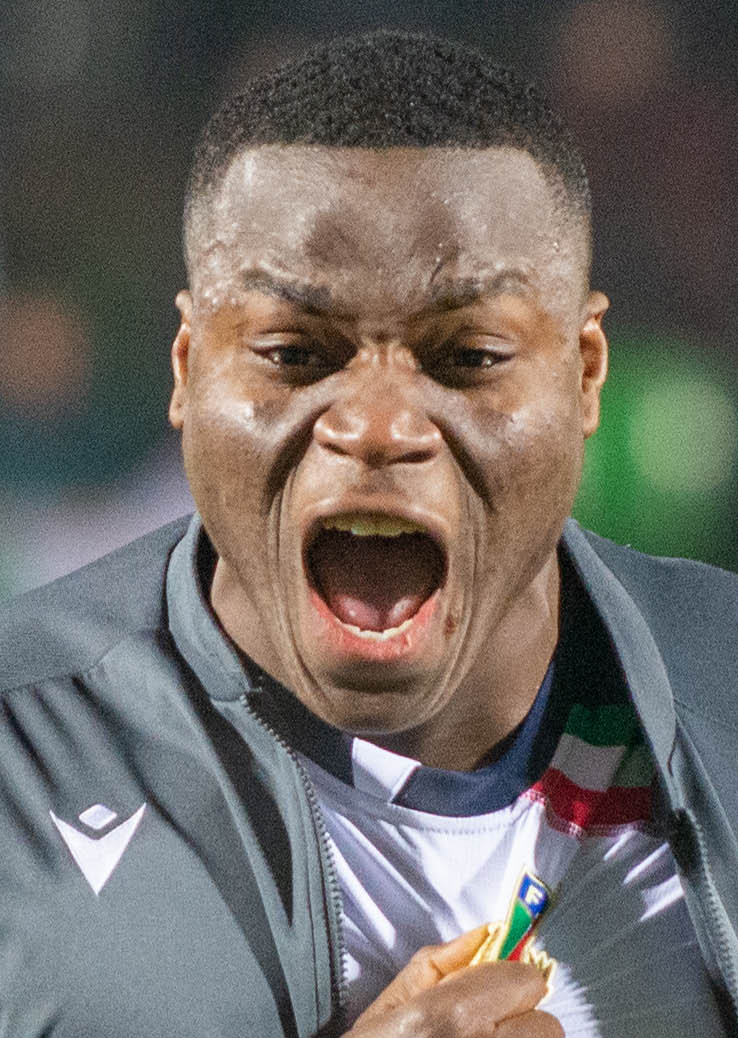
- Odiase in 2023
- Born: 19 January 2003 (age 23) Crema, Italy
- Height: 1.89 m (6 ft 2 1/2 in)
- Weight: 112 kg (17.6 st; 247 lb)

Rugby union career
- Position: Flanker
- Current team: Zebre Parma
Youth career
- 2020−2022: Colorno
Senior career
Years	Team	Apps	(Points)
2021−2022	Colorno	10	(0)
2022−2025	Oyonnax	15	(10)
2025−	Zebre Parma	17	(5)
- Correct as of 9 Aug 2026
International career
Years	Team	Apps	(Points)
2022–2023	Italy U20s	15	(10)
2025–	Italy	6	(0)
- Correct as of 25 Nov 2025

David Odiase (born 19 January 2003) is an Italian rugby union player, currently playing for Italian United Rugby Championship side Zebre Parma. His preferred position is flanker.

He formed by Italian Top10 team Colorno until 2021−22 season. Odiase signed for Oyonnax in summer 2022 for the Espoirs team. He made his debut in Round 1 of EPCR Challenge Cup in the 2023–24 season against the Dragons.

He signed for Zebre Parma in May 2025 ahead of the 2025–26 United Rugby Championship. He made his debut in Round 4 of the 2025–26 season against the Stormers.

In 2022 and 2023, Odiase was named in Italy U20s squad for annual Six Nations Under 20s Championship.

On 3 December 2024, he was called in Italy Under 23 squad for test series against Emerging Scotland.

He was named to Italy senior squad to participate in the 2025 Tour of Namibia and South Africa. On 5 July 2025, he made his debut in Pretoria against South Africa.
