= Giulio Bertaccini =

Italy international rugby union player

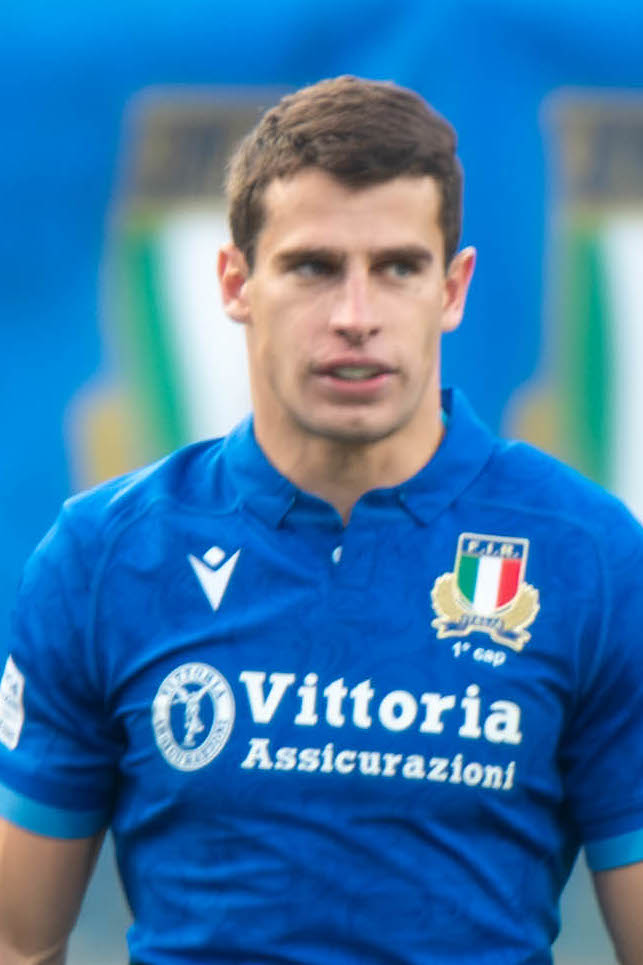
- Bertaccini in 2024
- Born: 29 November 2000 (age 25) Reggio Emilia, Italy
- Height: 1.83 m (6 ft 0 in)
- Weight: 91 kg (14 st 5 lb; 201 lb)

Rugby union career
- Position: Centre
- Current team: Zebre Parma
Youth career
- Amatori Rugby Parma
Senior career
Years	Team	Apps	(Points)
2018−2019	F.I.R. Academy		
2019–2025	Valorugby Emilia		
2024–2025	→Zebre Parma	4	(5)
2025–	Zebre Parma	19	(15)
- Correct as of 9 Aug 2026
International career
Years	Team	Apps	(Points)
2019–2020	Italy Under 20	8	(0)
2022	Emerging Italy	1	(0)
2026	Italy XV	1	(0)
2024–	Italy	4	(0)
- Correct as of 12 Jul 2025
National sevens team
Years	Team		Comps
2018	Italy Sevens		1
- Correct as of 20 September 24

Giulio Bertaccini (born 29 November 2000 in Reggio Emilia) is an Italian international rugby union player. His usual position is centre and he currently plays for Zebre Parma in United Rugby Championship. As of December 2025, he holds 4 caps for the Italian national team.

== Career ==
In 2018, he was also named in Italy Sevens squad for the 2018 Rugby Europe Sevens Grand Prix Series.

In 2019 and 2020, he was named in Italy U20s squad for annual Six Nations Under 20s Championship. On 26 May 2022, for the match against Netherlands, he was named in the 30-man Emerging Italy squad, for the 2022 July rugby union tests. On 10 January 2023, he was named in Italy A squad for a uncapped test against Romania A.

Under contract with Valorugby Emilia, Bertaccini was named as Permit Player for Zebre Parma in Summer 2024 ahead of the 2024–25 United Rugby Championship. He made his debut in Round 1 of United Rugby Championship in the 2024–25 season against the Cardiff with a try. He went on to collect 4 caps with Zebre during that season.

On 17 October 2024, he was selected by Gonzalo Quesada to be part of an Italy 34-man squad for the 2024 November Internationals. He made his debut against Georgia.

He signed a professional contract with Zebre ahead of the 2025–26 season.

In May 2025, he was chosen to participate in the 2025 Italy’s tour of Namibia and South Africa.

On 28 January 2026 he was selected by Massimo Brunello to be part of an Italy XV squad for two official tests against Scotland A and Chile during 2026 men's rugby union internationals window of spring.
