= Alessandro Fusco =

Italy international rugby union player

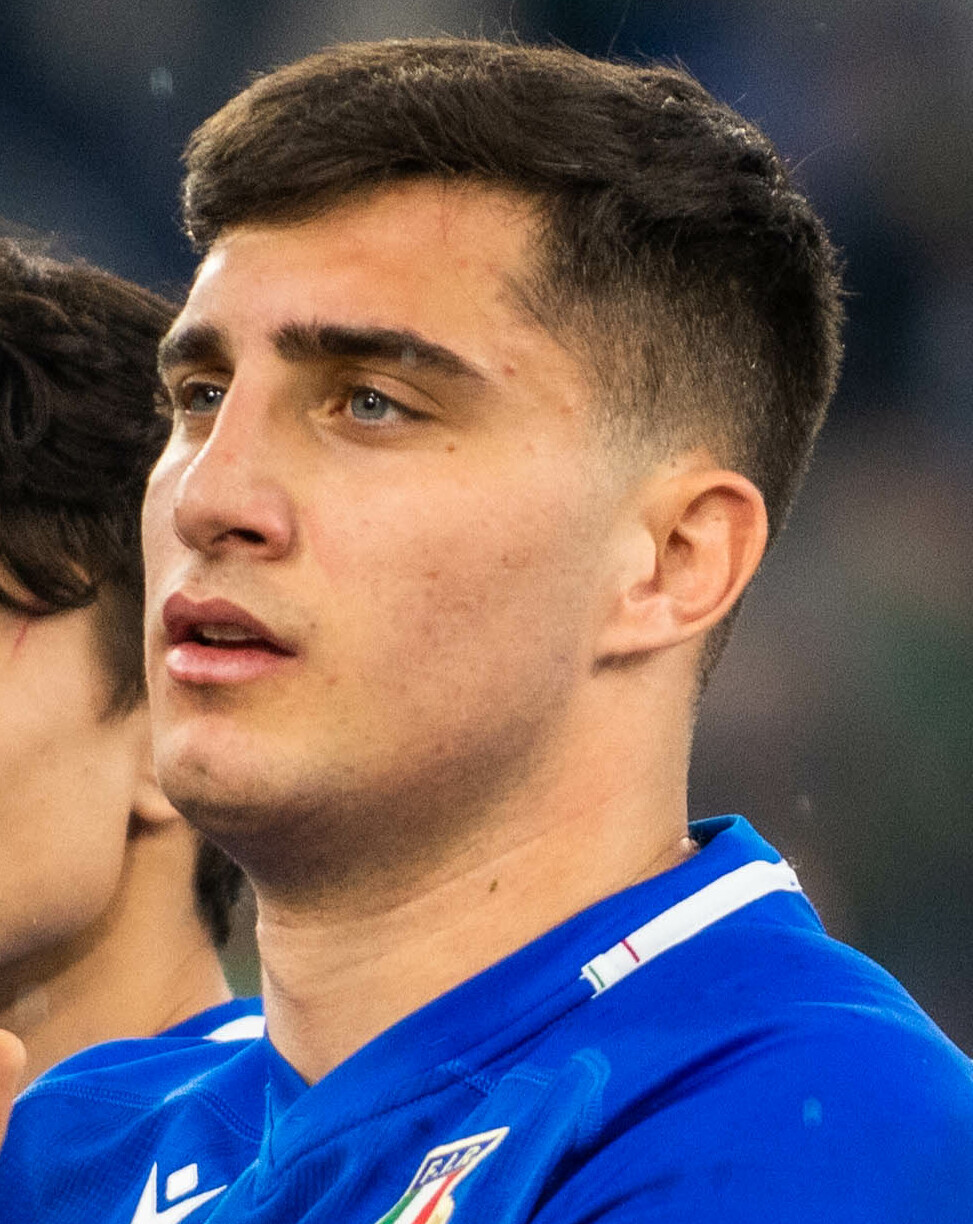
- Fusco in 2023
- Born: 28 October 1999 (age 27) Naples, Italy
- Height: 183 cm (6 ft 0 in)
- Weight: 85 kg (187 lb; 13 st 5 lb)

Rugby union career
- Position: Scrum-half
- Current team: Zebre Parma
Youth career
- Amatori Napoli Rugby
Senior career
Years	Team	Apps	(Points)
2019–2021	Fiamme Oro	19	(18)
2020–2021	→ Zebre Parma	3	(0)
2021–	Zebre Parma	71	(68)
- Correct as of 9 August 2026
International career
Years	Team	Apps	(Points)
2018–2019	Italy U20	14	(10)
2021–	Italy	27	(20)
- Correct as of 9 August 2026
National sevens team
Years	Team		Comps
2023−	Italy Sevens		2

Alessandro Fusco (born 28 October 1999) is an Italian professional rugby union player who primarily plays scrum-half for Zebre Parma in the United Rugby Championship. He has also represented Italy at international level, having made his test debut against Argentina during the 2021 Autumn Nations Series. Fusco has previously played for clubs such as Fiamme Oro in the past.

== Personal life ==
Fusco is the great-grandson of Elio Fusco, a 1960s Neapolitan rugby icon who played eleven times for Italy and coached the storied Partenope, winners of the Top10 in 1965 and 1966. His grandfather was an Italian rugby player as well.

== Professional career ==
Fusco has previously played for clubs such as Fiamme Oro. For the end of 2019–20 Pro14 season and for 2020–21 Pro14 season, Fusco was named as Permit Player for Zebre. He made his Zebre debut in Round 6 of the 2020–21 Pro14 against Munster.

In 2018 and 2019, Fusco was named in the Italy Under 20 squad. On 31 October 2021, he was selected by Kieran Crowley to be part of an Italy 34-man squad for the 2021 end-of-year rugby union internationals. He made his debut against Argentina.

In 2022, Fusco became the first person from Naples to play in the Six Nations, when replacing Stephen Varney in Italy's loss to England.

Fusco was named in Kieran Crowley's 33-man squad for the 2022 end-of-year rugby union internationals.

On 22 August 2023, he was named in the Italy's 33-man squad for the 2023 Rugby World Cup.

In June 2023, he was also named in Italy Sevens squad for the 2023 Rugby Europe Sevens Championship Series.

He was named to Italy squad to participate in the 2025 Tour of Namibia and South Africa.
