= Matteo Canali =

Italy international rugby union player

- Matteo Canali
- Born: 11 September 1998 (age 28) Marino, Italy
- Height: 1.98 m (6 ft 6 in)
- Weight: 118 kg (18 st 8 lb; 260 lb)

Rugby union career
- Position: Lock
- Current team: Zebre Parma
Youth career
- Rugby Ariccia
- –: Castel Gandolfo Rugby
- –: Roma Olimpic
- –: S.S. Lazio Rugby 1927
Amateur team(s)
Years	Team	Apps	(Points)
2017−2018	Colorno		
Senior career
Years	Team	Apps	(Points)
2016−2018	F.I.R. Academy		
2018−2021	Rovigo Delta	42	(30)
2020−2021	→Benetton	4	(0)
2021−2023	Petrarca Padova	17	(5)
2023−	Zebre Parma	51	(5)
- Correct as of 9 Aug 2026
International career
Years	Team	Apps	(Points)
2018	Italy Under 20	10	(0)
2021–2022	Italy A	2	(0)
2026	Italy XV	2	(0)
2024–	Italy	2	(0)
- Correct as of 12 Jul 2025

Matteo Canali (Marino, 11 September 1998) is an Italian professional rugby union player. His usual position is lock and he currently plays for Zebre Parma in United Rugby Championship.

== Career ==
Under contract with Rovigo Delta, for 2020–21 Pro14 season, he was named as Permit Player for Benetton Rugby. He played for Petrarca Padova in Italian Top10 from 2021 to 2023. Canali signed for Zebre Parma in August 2023 ahead of the 2023–24 United Rugby Championship. He made his debut in Round 1 of the 2023–24 season against the Ulster.

In 2018, Canali was named in the Italy Under 20 squad. On 14 October 2021, he was selected by Alessandro Troncon to be part of an Italy A 28-man squad and on 8 December, he was named in Emerging Italy 27-man squad for the 2021 end-of-year rugby union internationals.

On 28 January 2024, he was named in Italy squad for 2024 Six Nations Championship. He was also named in Italy squad for the 2025 Six Nations Championship as invited player, but did not play during the championship. On 28 January 2026 he was selected by Massimo Brunello to be part of an Italy XV squad for two official tests against Scotland A and Chile during 2026 men's rugby union internationals window of spring..

He was called up to join Italy 2025 Tour of Namibia and South Africa. On 5 July 2025, he made his debut in Pretoria against South Africa.
