= Jacopo Trulla =

Italy international rugby union player

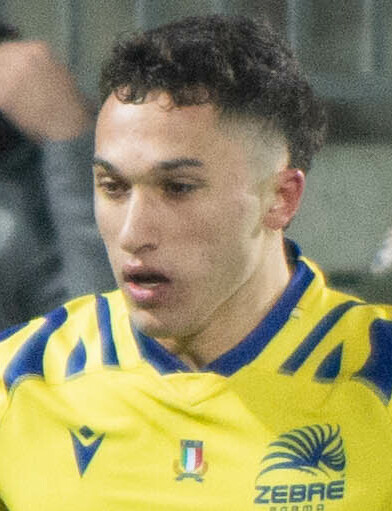
- Trulla in 2023
- Born: 5 July 2000 (age 26) Vicenza, Italy
- Height: 1.83 m (6 ft 0 in)
- Weight: 90 kg (14 st 2 lb; 198 lb)

Rugby union career
- Position: Wing
- Current team: Zebre
Youth career
- Valsugana Rugby
- –: Rangers Rugby
Senior career
Years	Team	Apps	(Points)
2018−2020	F.I.R. Academy		
2019–2021	Calvisano	20	(27)
2019−2021	→ Zebre	5	(0)
2021−	Zebre	73	(134)
- Correct as of 9 Aug 2026
International career
Years	Team	Apps	(Points)
2019–2020	Italy Under 20	12	(30)
2020–	Italy	17	(20)
2021–	Italy A	2	(5)
- Correct as of 12 Jul 2025

Jacopo Trulla (Vicenza, 5 July 2000) is an Italian professional rugby union player. His usual position is wing, and he currently plays for Zebre Parma in United Rugby Championship.

Trulla represented Calvisano in the 2019–20 European Rugby Challenge Cup. For the last matches of 2019–20 Pro14 and for 2020–21 Pro14 season, he was named as Permit Player for Zebre.

In 2019 and 2020, Trulla was also named in the Italy Under 20 squad for the 2019 Six Nations Under 20s Championship and in 2020 the squad for the 2020 Six Nations Under 20s Championship. From November 2020 he is also part of Italy squad. On the 14 October 2021, he was selected by Alessandro Troncon to be part of an Italy A 28-man squad for the 2021 end-of-year rugby union internationals.

He was included in Italy squad for the 2024 Autumn Nations series and the 2025 Six Nations Championship.

In May 2025, he was named to Italy squad to participate in the 2025 Tour of Namibia and South Africa.
