= Danilo Fischetti =

Italy international rugby union player

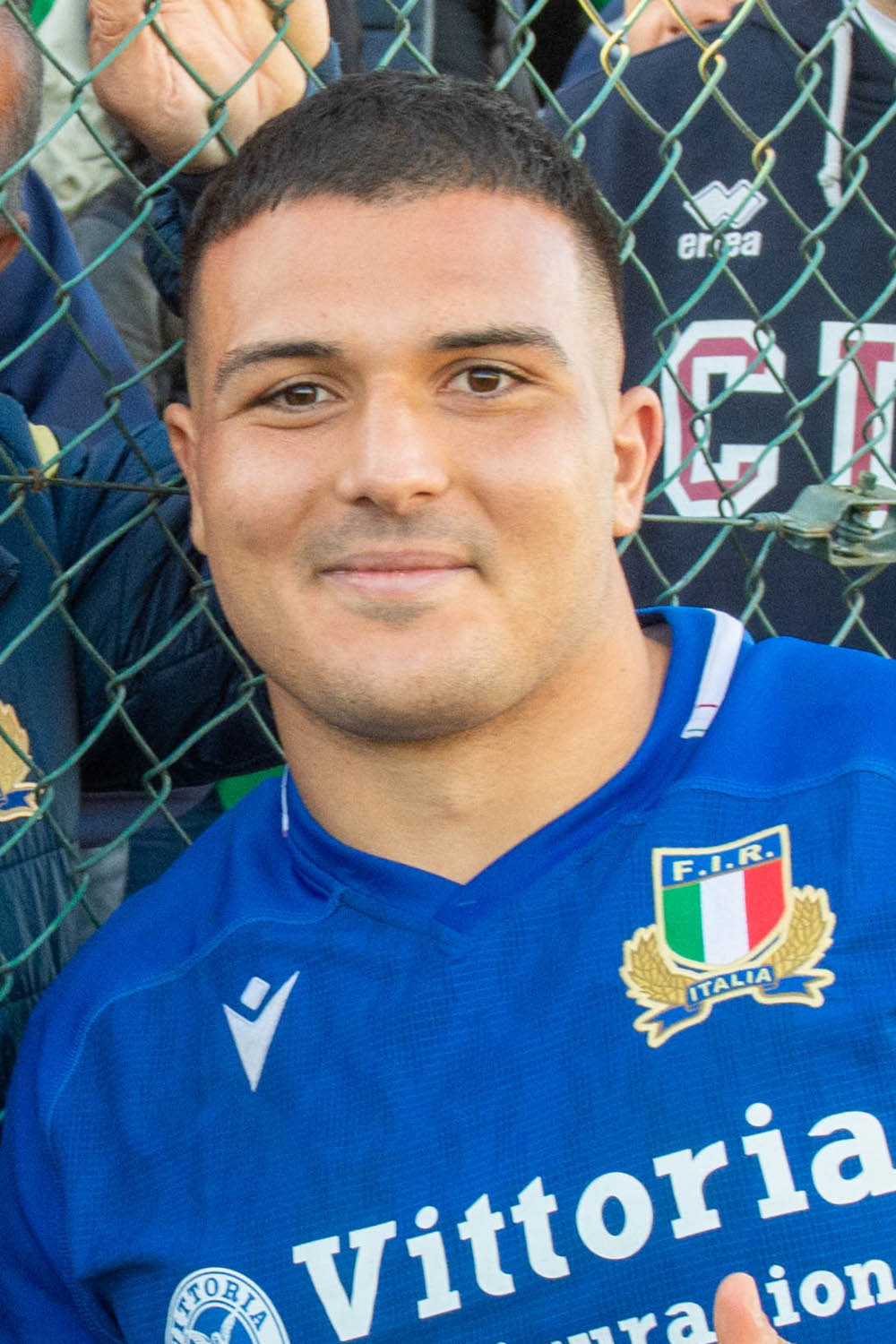
- Fischetti in 2022
- Born: 26 January 1998 (age 28) Genzano di Roma, Italy
- Height: 181 cm (5 ft 11 in)
- Weight: 120 kg (265 lb; 18 st 13 lb)

Rugby union career
- Position: Prop
- Current team: Northampton Saints
Youth career
- 2010−2012: Aprilia Rugby
- 2012−2014: Rugby Lanuvio
- 2014−2016: Unione Rugby Capitolina
Senior career
Years	Team	Apps	(Points)
2016–2017	F.I.R. Academy		
2017–2019	Calvisano	30	(15)
2019	→ Zebre Parma	5	(0)
2019−2022	Zebre Parma	36	(0)
2022–2023	London Irish	19	(10)
2023−2025	Zebre Parma	28	(5)
2025−	Northampton Saints	22	(20)
- Correct as of 30 Aug 2026
International career
Years	Team	Apps	(Points)
2017−2018	Italy U20	19	(10)
2020–	Italy	66	(0)
- Correct as of 30 Aug 2026

Danilo Fischetti (born 26 January 1998) is an Italian professional rugby union player who primarily plays prop for Northampton Saints in English Premiership Rugby.

== Professional career ==
Under contract with Calvisano, in 2018–19 Pro14 season, he named as Permit Player for Zebre in Pro 14. From 2019 to 2022, Fischetti played with Zebre. For 2022−23 season, he signed with London Irish to play in the English Premiership, until the collapse of the team. In July 2023 he signed with Zebre. He played with Parma until 2025, when he joined Northampton Saints.

In 2017 and 2018, Fischetti was named in the Italy Under 20 squad. From 2019 he was also named in the Italy squad, having made his test debut against Wales during the 2020 Six Nations Championship.

On 22 August 2023, he was named in the Italy's 33-man squad for the 2023 Rugby World Cup. He participated in Italy's squad for the 2025 Tour of Namibia and South Africa.

On 8 April 2025, Fischetti would return to England again to join Premiership rivals Northampton Saints back in the Premiership Rugby from the 2025–26 season.
