= Pablo Dimcheff =

Italy international rugby union player (born 1999)

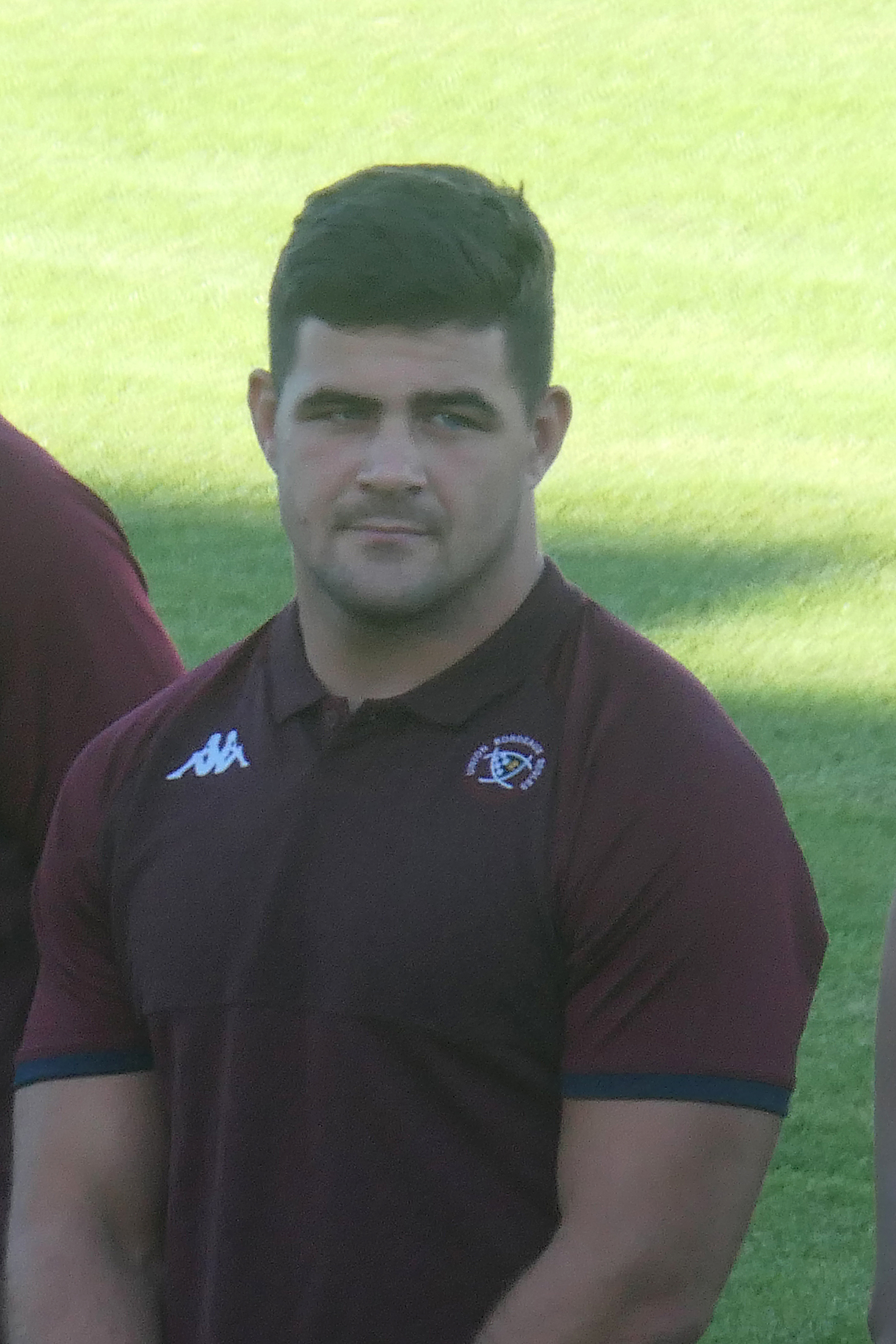
- Born: 1 July 1999 (age 27) Buenos Aires, Argentina
- Height: 1.82 m (6 ft 0 in)
- Weight: 104 kg (229 lb)

Rugby union career
- Position: Hooker
- Current team: Colomiers Rugby
Senior career
Years	Team	Apps	(Points)
2018–19	Pucara		
2019	Jaguares		
2020	Dogos XV		
2020–21	Charente	10	(5)
2021–23	Bordeaux	10	(0)
2021–22	→ Stade Montois (loan)	7	(20)
2023–	Colomiers	52	(55)
- Correct as of 17 Sep 2026
International career
Years	Team	Apps	(Points)
2019	Argentina U20	5	(5)
2025-	Italy	5	(5)
- Correct as of 17 Sep 2026

Pablo Dimcheff (born 1 July 1999) is an Argentine-born professional rugby union player who plays hooker for Colomiers Rugby in Pro D2. He represents Italy at international level, qualifying through his grandparents, and making his debut in 2025.

== Club career ==
Dimcheff played for Club Pucará in Buenos Aires prior to joining Jaguares in the city. Then he joined Ceibos to play in the Súper Liga Americana de Rugby. In July 2020, he moved to France to play for Soyaux Angoulême XV Charente in French second division, the Pro D2.

Dimcheff later moved to the Top 14 with Union Bordeaux Bègles in June 2021. He played on loan with Stade Montois Rugby back in Pro D2, however, suffered a cruciate knee ligament injury the following year which ruled him out of action for many months.

In January 2023, Dimcheff signed for Colomiers Rugby. He continued to suffer from injuries, including an injury to his knee meniscus and his calf. During the 2024-2025 season, Dimcheff was healthier again, and scored ten tries, and played 24 league matches despite making many of his appearances from the bench. In February 2025, he extended his contract until June 2028.

== International career ==
Dimcheff played for the Argentina national under-20 rugby union team at the 2019 World Rugby Under 20 Championship, and was the starting hooker in the team that beat France U20 to reach the semi-final.

Dimcheff was called up to the Italy national rugby union team for the first time in May 2025, qualifying for Italy through grandparents from Calabria. He was selected for his Italy debut against South Africa in July 2025. In October 2025, he retained his place in the squad for the Autumn Nations Series.
