= Giacomo Da Re =

Italy international rugby union player

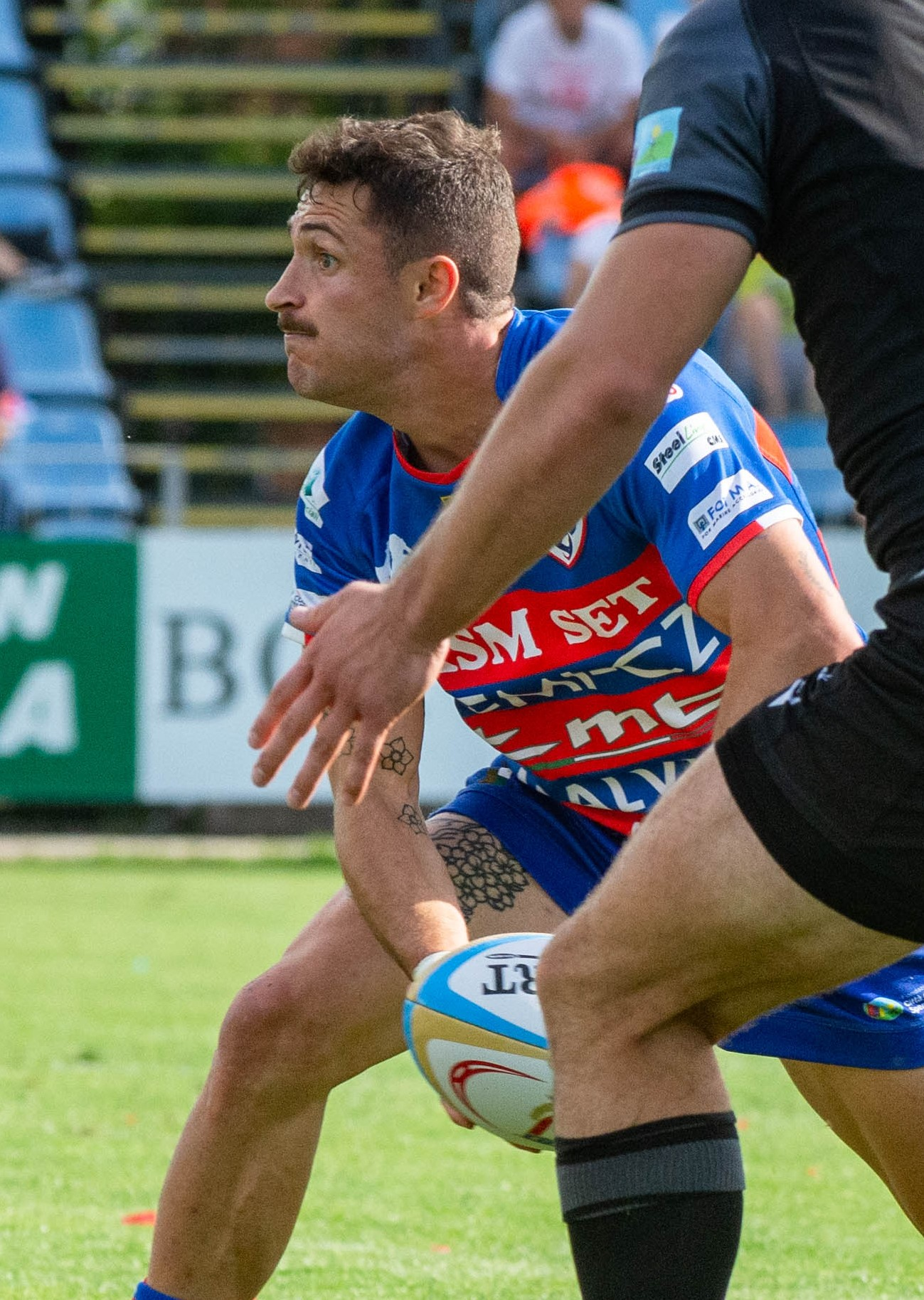
- Da Re in 2022
- Born: 29 March 1999 (age 27) Treviso, Italy
- Height: 1.81 m (5 ft 11 1/2 in)
- Weight: 83 kg (13.1 st; 183 lb)

Rugby union career
- Position: Fly-half / Fullback
- Current team: Zebre Parma
Youth career
- Benetton
- 2015–2017: F.I.R. Academy
Senior career
Years	Team	Apps	(Points)
2017–2020	Mogliano	47	(38)
2021–2022	Rovigo Delta	11	(30)
2022	→ Benetton	4	(15)
2022–2024	Benetton	10	(10)
2024–	Zebre Parma	35	(159)
- Correct as of 9 Aug 2026
International career
Years	Team	Apps	(Points)
2019	Italy U20	8	(14)
2021	Italy A	2	(14)
2022	Italy	7	(34)
- Correct as of 9 Aug 2026

Giacomo Da Re (born 29 March 1999) is a professional Italian rugby union player. His preferred position is fly-half and fullback. He currently plays for Zebre Parma in United Rugby Championship.

== Career ==
Under contract, first with Mogliano and afterwards with Rovigo Delta, in 2020–21 Pro14 and 2021–22 United Rugby Championship seasons, Da Re was named as Permit Player for Benetton Rugby. He made his debut in Round 11 of the 2021–22 United Rugby Championship against the Dragons. He played for Benetton until 2023–24 United Rugby Championship season.

Da Re signed for Zebre Parma in April 2024 ahead of the 2024–25 United Rugby Championship. He made his debut in Round 1 of United Rugby Championship in the 2024–25 season against the Cardiff.

In 2019, Da Re was named in the Italy Under 20 squad. On 14 October 2021, he was selected by Alessandro Troncon to be part of an Italy A 28-man squad and on 8 December he was named in Emerging Italy 27-man squad for the 2021 end-of-year rugby union internationals. On 13 January 2022, Da Re was named in the Italian squad for 2022 Six Nations Championship. On 30 May 2022, Da Re was selected by Kieran Crowley to be part of an Italy 33-man squad for the 2022 mid-year rugby union tests. He made his debut against Portugal. On 30 November 2023 he was called in Italy Under 23 squad for test series against IRFU Combined Academies.

On 22 August 2023, he was named in the Italy's 33-man squad for the 2023 Rugby World Cup.

He was named to Italy squad to participate in the 2025 Tour of Namibia and South Africa.
