= Zebre Parma =

Italian rugby union club, based in Parma

- Union: Italian Rugby Federation
- Nickname: The XV of the North-West (il XV del Nord-Ovest)
- Founded: 1973 (as Invitational Team – disbanded in 1997); 2012; 14 years ago (as Professional Team)
- Location: Parma, Italy
- Ground(s): Stadio Sergio Lanfranchi, Parma (Capacity: 5,000)
- President: Gianni Fava
- Coach: Massimo Brunello
- Captain: Alessandro Fusco
- Most appearances: Guglielmo Palazzani (161)
- Top scorer: Carlo Canna (717)
- Most tries: Simone Gesi (36)
- League: United Rugby Championship
- 2025–26: 16th (Scottish/Italian Shield: 4th)
1st kit	2nd kit

Official website
- www.zebreparma.it
- Current season

Zebre Parma (Italian pronunciation: [ˈdzɛbre], meaning "Zebras") are an Italian professional rugby union team competing in the United Rugby Championship and EPCR competitions from the 2012–13 season. They are based in Parma (Emilia-Romagna), Italy. They are operated by the Italian Rugby Federation (FIR) and replaced Aironi in the Pro12.

Zebre Parma, often referred to as "the XV of the North-West" (Italian: il XV del Nord-Ovest), represents the four committees of Emilia-Romagna, Liguria, Lombardy and Piedmont, which includes tens of thousands of members and several clubs. Since 2018, it represents also teams from others committees like Abruzzo, Lazio, Marche, Tuscany and Sicily. The team was officially named Zebre Parma at the start of the 2021–22 United Rugby Championship season.

== History ==
The entry of Italian teams into the Celtic League had been proposed for many years. After several failed attempts, there was hope that a deal for Italian entry would be done in time for the 2010–11 season, with the Scots delaying support for entry until changes were made to the Celtic League management structure. In February 2010, it was announced that the planned expansion of the Celtic League was to be put on hold. The reasons were the insistence by existing members that the Italian teams could be ejected after three years. Also, the financial demands that the league placed on the Italians could not be met. The existing teams said this was to cover the need to have larger squads to cover the extra fixtures and additional travel expenses. Agreement was reached in early March 2010 to allow Italian teams entry to the Celtic League in time for the 2010–11 season. The clubs will also be guaranteed places in the annual Heineken Cup, which had previously been awarded to the two top teams in the National Championship of Excellence.

Italy have failed to make an impact in the Six Nations Championship since joining in 2000. This has largely been blamed on the fact their best players do not have a competitive enough domestic tournament or are forced to play abroad. The fact that the Six Nations decider in 2009 between Wales and Ireland featured 42 Celtic League players out of 44 in their squads supported this notion.

After initial applications in 2010, it was proposed that Aironi would join along with a new team, Praetorians Roma, but Benetton Treviso were nominated instead. Benetton Treviso and Duchi Nord-Ovest could not agree to form one club to represent the Veneto region and lost out in the first round of bidding despite the region being the traditional home of Italian rugby. However, Pretorians Roma failed to satisfy the evaluators of their financial muscle and Benetton Treviso were nominated in their place.

Former logo, used until June 2023

Aironi struggled in their first season; a surprise European Cup win over Biarritz was the only highlight of a campaign in which they managed only one Pro12 victory. At the end of a second season of struggle on the pitch, Aironi succumbed to financial difficulties off it. Their licence to play both in the European Cup and Pro12 was revoked by the Italian Rugby Federation. The Federation decided against another domestic Italian club taking over the running of the licence, instead opting to maintain complete control of a planned new franchise. In June 2012, it was announced that the new franchise would be known as Zebre and based in Parma.

Zebre did not enjoy much success in their first season, 2012–13, finishing bottom after winless campaigns in both the Pro12 and the Heineken Cup. Although they finished the subsequent 2013–14 season bottom once again, their performance was much improved, seeing their first victory against Cardiff Blues at the Arms Park into Round 3 of Pro12, in a season in which they had five league victories, with their away win in Cardiff followed by home victories against the Ospreys, Edinburgh, Cardiff Blues and Italian Rivals Treviso, who finished the season a single point ahead of Zebre. They fared somewhat worse in 2014–15, managing only 3 victories and finishing bottom of the table for the third season running. In the 2015–16 seasons they again earned five victories including back to back victories against Treviso and a bonus-point victory against the Newport Gwent Dragons. Zebre avoided finishing in last place for the first time.

== Honours ==
- Italian Celtic League/Pro12/Pro14 derbies:
  - Winners: 1 (2015–16)

== Current standings ==
Pos	Team	Pld	W	D	L	PF	PA	PD	TF	TA	TB	LB	Pts	Qualification
1	Glasgow Warriors	18	13	0	5	479	338	+141	72	48	11	2	65	Qualification for the Champions Cup and knockout stage
2	Leinster (CH)	18	12	0	6	515	370	+145	77	51	13	2	63	Qualification for the Champions Cup and knockout stage
3	Stormers	18	12	1	5	504	344	+160	63	48	9	1	60	Qualification for the Champions Cup and knockout stage
4	Bulls (RU)	18	12	0	6	576	406	+170	82	59	10	1	59	Qualification for the Champions Cup and knockout stage
5	Munster	18	11	0	7	396	376	+20	59	51	8	3	55	Qualification for the Champions Cup and knockout stage
6	Cardiff	18	11	0	7	353	372	−19	52	52	7	4	55	Qualification for the Champions Cup and knockout stage
7	Lions	18	10	1	7	532	473	+59	73	70	9	3	54	Qualification for the Champions Cup and knockout stage
8	Connacht	18	10	0	8	442	395	+47	62	56	10	4	54	Qualification for the Champions Cup and knockout stage
9	Ulster	18	9	1	8	494	420	+74	72	60	10	4	52	Qualification for the Challenge Cup
10	Sharks	18	8	1	9	467	428	+39	71	57	9	3	46	Qualification for the Challenge Cup
11	Ospreys	18	7	2	9	376	454	−78	55	69	4	3	39	Qualification for the Challenge Cup
12	Edinburgh	18	7	0	11	362	439	−77	57	66	6	4	38	Qualification for the Challenge Cup
13	Benetton	18	6	2	10	327	493	−166	41	71	4	1	33	Qualification for the Challenge Cup
14	Scarlets	18	4	2	12	361	460	−99	52	63	3	5	28	Qualification for the Challenge Cup
15	Dragons	18	3	4	11	350	481	−131	46	71	4	4	28	Qualification for the Challenge Cup
16	Zebre	18	2	0	16	312	587	−275	43	85	3	4	15	Qualification for the Challenge Cup

Updated to match(es) played on 16 May 2026. Source: UnitedRugby.com
Rules for classification: Tiebreakers for teams tied on points: 1) Number of matches won 2) The difference between points for and points against 3) The number of tries scored 4) The most points scored 5) The difference between tries for and tries against 6) The fewest red cards received 7) The fewest yellow cards received.

== The team ==
=== Name history ===
Founded in 1973 by the former Italian national captain Marco Bollesan, Zebre (English: Zebras) was chosen, in 2012, by the Italian Rugby Federation as the new franchise's name. The name had been used by an invitational select rugby union team based in Northwest Italy that played regular fixtures between 1973 and 1997. In those 23 years, 25 matches were held against international clubs; and resulted in a high number of victories for Zebre. The opening match was an unofficial test played in Milan in 1973 against the Australian team of Randwick Sydney, who won 21–50. Zebre had a memorable 48–38 victory against the Barbarians in Brescia in June 1997.

Two other former select teams are Dogi (The Doges) based in Triveneto and I Lupi (The Wolves) based in Central and Southern Italy.

=== Stadium and training ===
The team play in Parma at the Stadio Sergio Lanfranchi, the former home ground of Crociati Parma and the F.I.R. Academy. Initially, the ground is being refurbished and expanded. Zebre usually hold their summer training camp at Parma University. In its history, Zebre played also official matches in others different homegrounds:
– In the 2012–13 Pro12 season at Reggio Emilia's Stadio Città del Tricolore, against Leinster;
– In the 2017–18 Pro14 season at Stadio Tommaso Fattori of L'Aquila, Abruzzo, against Dragons;
– In the 2018–19 Pro14 season at Stadio Luigi Zaffanella of Viadana, Lombardy, against Leinster
– In the 2019–20 European Rugby Challenge Cup season at Stadio San Michele of Calvisano, Lombardy, against Brive
– In the 2019–20 Pro14 season at Stadio Giovanni Mari of Legnano, Lombardy, against Munster;

=== Staff and coaching team ===
The staff for the 2026–27 season is:

- Head coach – Massimo Brunello
- Assistant coaches – Aldo Birchall, Mattia Dolcetto, Gilberto Pavan, Giampiero de Carli, David Sisi
- Sporting director - George Biagi
- Team Manager – Giancarlo Garavaldi
- Fitness coach – Francesco Della Ceca, Sebastiano Peri, Pietro Sirocchi
- Video analyst – Niccolò Gaetaniello, Flavio Ferraresi

=== Players ===
Zebre is mostly based on Italian players, rather than foreigners. In 2012, of the initial list of 36 contracted players, only three were ineligible to play for Italy. Nineteen former Aironi players were included in the original squad. An emphasis on youth development was also visible, with a significant portion of the squad being made up of members of F.I.R. Academy Ivan Francescato .

== Current squad ==
2026–27 Zebre Parma squad
**Props**: (Italy) **Paolo Buonfiglio**; (Italy) Luca Franceschetto; (Italy) **Muhamed Hasa**; (Italy) Sergio Pelliccioli; (Argentina) Juan Pitinari *; (Italy) **Luca Rizzoli**; **Hookers**: (Italy) **Tommaso Di Bartolomeo**; (Argentina) Francisco Minervino *; (Italy) Giovanni Quattrini; (Italy) Giampietro Ribaldi; **Locks**: (Italy) **Matteo Canali**; (Argentina) Franco Carrera; (Italy) Leonard Krumov; (Italy) Francesco Ruffolo	**Back row**: (Italy) Jacopo Botturi; (Italy) Giacomo Ferrari; (Italy) **Giovanni Licata** **(c)**; (Italy) **Samuele Locatelli**; (Italy) **David Odiase**; (Italy) **Alessandro Ortombina**; (Italy) Davide Ruggeri; (Argentina) Bautista Stavile *; **Scrum-halves**: (Argentina) Patricio Baronio *; (Italy) Lorenzo Citton; (Argentina) Thomas Dominguez *; (Italy) **Alessandro Fusco**; **Fly-halves**: (Italy) **Giacomo Da Re**; (Italy) Giovanni Montemauri	**Centres**: (Italy) **Giulio Bertaccini**; (South Africa) Zane Bester; (Italy) Damiano Mazza; (Italy) **Marco Zanon**; **Wings**: (Italy) **Mirko Belloni**; (Italy) **Simone Gesi**; (Italy) Leonardo Sodo Migliori; (Italy) **Jacopo Trulla**; **Fullbacks**: (Italy) **Tommaso Allan**; (Argentina) Tobías Wade
**(c)** denotes the team captain. **Bold** denotes internationally capped players. * denotes players qualified to play for Italy on residency or dual nationality. Taking into account signings and departures ahead of 2026–27 season as listed on List of 2025–26 United Rugby Championship transfers. Source:

=== Additional players ===
2026–27 Zebre Parma additional players
**Props**: (Italy) **Filippo Alongi** (Note: Additional player from Valorugby Emilia); (Argentina) Octavio Barbatti (Note: Additional player from Petrarca Padova)*; (Argentina) Juan Barbotti (Note: Additional player from Rugby Calvisano)*; (Argentina) Juan Ignacio Castellano (Note: Additional player from Rugby Parabiago)*; (Italy) Federico Pisani (Note: Additional player from Petrarca Padova); **Locks**: (Italy) Simone Invernizzi (Note: Additional player from FIR Academy); (Italy) Alex Mattioli (Note: Additional player from Lyons Piacenza); (Italy) Pietro Turrisi (Note: Additional player from Rugby Parabiago)	**Back row**: (Italy) Matteo Sebastiani (Note: Additional player from FIR Academy); **Scrum halves**: (South Africa) Migael Prinsloo (Note: Additional player from Valorugby Emilia)*; **Fly-halves**: (Italy) Francesco Alderighi (Note: Additional player from FIR Academy)	**Centres**: (Italy) Riccardo Casarin (Note: Additional player from Valorugby Emilia); (Italy) Massimo Molina (Note: Additional player from FIR Academy); (Italy) Dewi Passarella (Note: Additional player from Petrarca Padova); **Wings**: (Italy) Manuel Scappini (Note: Additional player from FIR Academy)
**(c)** denotes the team captain. **Bold** denotes internationally capped players. * denotes players qualified to play for Italy on residency or dual nationality. Taking into account signings and departures ahead of 2025–26 season as listed on List of 2026–27 United Rugby Championship transfers. Source:

== Selected former players ==
Former players who have played for Zebre and have caps for their respective country

- (Argentina) Eduardo Bello
- (Argentina) Gonzalo García
- (Argentina) Enrique Pieretto
- (Argentina) Bruno Postiglioni
- (Argentina) Guillermo Roan
- (Australia) Luke Burgess
- (England) Matt Kvesic
- (Fiji) Rusiate Nasove
- (Fiji) Kameli Ratuvou
- (Fiji) Asaeli Tuivuaka
- (Italy) Matías Agüero
- (Italy) Andrea Bacchetti
- (Italy) Mattia Bellini
- (Italy) Alberto Benettin
- (Italy) Mauro Bergamasco
- (Italy) Mirco Bergamasco
- (Italy) Valerio Bernabò
- (Italy) George Biagi
- (Italy) Luca Bigi
- (Italy) Giulio Bisegni
- (Italy) Marco Bortolami
- (Italy) Pierre Bruno
- (Italy) Paolo Buso
- (Italy) Carlo Canna
- (Italy) Tommaso Castello
- (Italy) Pietro Ceccarelli
- (Italy) Alberto Chillon
- (Italy) Dario Chistolini
- (Italy) Tommaso D'Apice
- (Italy) Paul Derbyshire
- (Italy) Andrea De Marchi
- (Italy) Oliviero Fabiani
- (Italy) Carlo Festuccia
- (Italy) Danilo Fischetti
- (Italy) Joshua Furno
- (Italy) Quintin Geldenhuys
- (Italy) Gonzalo García
- (Italy) Renato Giammarioli
- (Italy) Davide Giazzon
- (Italy) Kelly Haimona
- (Italy) Tommaso Iannone
- (Italy) Andrea Lovotti
- (Italy) Enrico Lucchin
- (Italy) Marco Manfredi
- (Italy) Andrea Manici
- (Italy) Johan Meyer
- (Italy) Maxime Mbanda
- (Italy) Matteo Minozzi
- (Italy) Federico Mori
- (Italy) Luca Morisi
- (Italy) Ion Neculai
- (Italy) Luciano Orquera
- (Italy) Roberto Quartaroli
- (Italy) Samuele Pace
- (Italy) Edoardo Padovani
- (Italy) Guglielmo Palazzani
- (Italy) Sami Panico
- (Italy) Salvatore Perugini
- (Italy) Jake Polledri
- (Italy) Matteo Pratichetti
- (Italy) Daniele Rimpelli
- (Italy) Lorenzo Romano
- (Italy) Federico Ruzza
- (Italy) Jacopo Sarto
- (Italy) Leonardo Sarto
- (Italy) Fabio Semenzato
- (Italy) David Sisi
- (Italy) Josh Sole
- (Italy) Cristian Stoian
- (Italy) Tito Tebaldi
- (Italy) Giulio Toniolatti
- (Italy) Jimmy Tuivaiti
- (Italy) Dries van Schalkwyk
- (Italy) Giovanbattista Venditti
- (Italy) Marcello Violi
- (Italy) Michele Visentin
- (Italy) Samuela Vunisa
- (Italy) Andrea Zambonin
- (Italy) Giosuè Zilocchi
- (Italy) (United States) Tommaso Boni
- (Moldova) Andrei Mahu
- (New Zealand) Kurt Baker
- (New Zealand) Brendon Leonard
- (New Zealand) Mils Muliaina
- (Romania) Iacopo Bianchi
- (Romania) Alexandru Țăruș
- (Samoa) Failaga Afamasaga
- (Samoa) Sinoti Sinoti
- (Tonga) Fetuli Paea
- (Tonga) Latu Latunipulu
- (United States) Shilo Klein

== Season records ==
=== Pro12 ===
Season	Pos	Played	Won	Drawn	Lost	Bonus	Points
2012–13	12th	22	0	0	22	10	10
2013–14	12th	22	5	2	15	5	29
2014–15	12th	22	3	0	19	3	15
2015–16	11th	22	5	0	17	4	24
2016–17	12th	22	3	0	19	7	19

=== Pro14 ===
Season	Conference	Pos	Played	Won	Drawn	Lost	Bonus	Points
2017–18	Conference A	7th	21	7	0	14	8	36
2018–19	Conference A	7th	21	3	0	18	7	19
2019–20	Conference A	6th	15	3	1	11	7	21
2020–21	Conference A	6th	16	4	0	12	1	17

=== Pro14 Rainbow Cup ===
Season	Pos	Played	Won	Drawn	Lost	Bonus	Points
2021	12th	5	0	0	5	3	3

=== United Rugby Championship ===
Season	Pos	Played	Won	Drawn	Lost	Bonus	Points
2021-22	16th	18	1	0	17	5	9
2022-23	16th	18	0	0	18	11	11
2023-24	16th	18	1	1	16	9	15
2024-25	15th	18	5	1	12	7	29
2025-26	TBD	-	-	-	-	-	-

=== European Rugby Challenge Cup / EPCR Challenge Cup ===
Season	Pool/Round	Pos	Played	Won	Drawn	Lost	Bonus	Points
2014–15	Pool 5	3rd	6	2	0	4	0	8
2015–16	Pool 4	2nd	6	3	0	3	1	13
2017–18	Pool 3	3rd	6	1	0	5	4	8
2018–19	Pool 4	3rd	6	3	0	3	2	14
2019–20	Pool 4	3rd	6	2	1	3	3	13
2020-21	Preliminary stage	5th	2	1	1	0	0	6
2020-21	Round of 16	Zebre Parma 27-35 Bath Rugby						
2021-22	Pool A	5th	4	0	0	4	2	2
2022-23	Pool A	10th	4	0	0	4	1	1
2023-24	Pool 1	4th	4	2	0	2	2	10
2023-24	Round of 16	Sharks 47 - 3 Zebre Parma						
2024-25	Pool 1	6th	4	0	0	4	2	2
2025-26	Pool 1	2nd	4	3	0	1	2	14
2025-26	Round of 16	Zebre Parma 31 - 15 Pau						
2025-26	Quarter-finals	Zebre Parma 32 - 35 Dragons						

=== Heineken Cup / European Rugby Champions Cup ===
Season	Pool/Round	Pos	Played	Won	Drawn	Lost	Bonus	Points
2012–13	Pool 3	4th	6	0	0	6	1	1
2013–14	Pool 3	4th	6	0	0	6	0	0
2016–17	Pool 2	4th	6	0	0	6	0	0

== Personnel honours and records ==
(correct as of 31 Oct 2026)

Bold indicates active player

Category	Player	Total
Tries	(Italy) **Simone Gesi**	36
Appearances	(Italy) Guglielmo Palazzani	161
Points	(Italy) Carlo Canna	717

Most tries
Rank	Player	Tries
1	(Italy) **Simone Gesi**	36
2	(Italy) **Jacopo Trulla**	25
3	(Italy) Dries Van Schalkwyk	24
4	(Italy) Mattia Bellini	21
5	(Italy) Johan Meyer	19
6	(Italy) Carlo Canna	17
7	(Italy) **Giovanni Licata**	16
8	(Italy) Giulio Bisegni	15
8	(United States) Tommaso Boni	15
8	(Italy) **Alessandro Fusco**	15
8	(Italy) Giovanbattista Venditti	15

Most appearances
Rank	Player	Apps
1	(Italy) Guglielmo Palazzani	161
2	(Italy) **Leonard Krumov**	154
3	(Italy) Oliviero Fabiani	140
4	(Italy) George Biagi	119
5	(Italy) Giulio Bisegni	118
5	(Italy) Carlo Canna	118
7	(Italy) Dario Chistolini	116
7	(Italy) Andrea Lovotti	116
9	(United States) Tommaso Boni	113
10	(Italy) Andrea De Marchi	109

Most points
Rank	Player	Points
1	(Italy) Carlo Canna	717
2	(Italy) Luciano Orquera	242
3	(Italy) **Simone Gesi**	183
4	(Italy) **Giacomo Da Re**	174
5	(Argentina) Gerónimo Prisciantelli	158
6	(Italy) Antonio Rizzi	153
7	(Italy) **Giovanni Montemauri**	152
8	(Italy) **Jacopo Trulla**	134
9	(Italy) Edoardo Padovani	123
10	(Italy) Dries Van Schalkwyk	120

== Zebre Parma Women ==
Since November 2023, the Franchise has also had a women's team, which plays official tests with Spanish team.

== See also ==
- Pro14
- Heineken Cup
- Aironi
