= Damiano Mazza (rugby union) =

Italian rugby union player

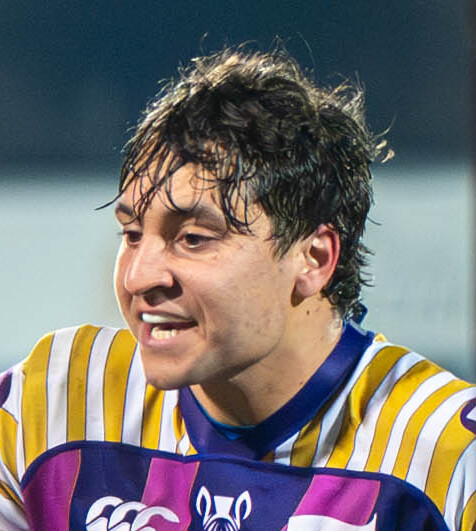
- Mazza in 2025
- Born: 16 February 1999 (age 27) Montecchio Emilia, Italy
- Height: 1.83 m (6 ft 0 in)
- Weight: 99 kg (15 st 8 lb; 218 lb)

Rugby union career
- Position: Centre
- Current team: Zebre Parma
Youth career
- Parma
Senior career
Years	Team	Apps	(Points)
2017–2018	F.I.R. Academy		
2018–2022	Calvisano	51	(45)
2022–	Zebre Parma	40	(0)
- Correct as of 9 Aug 2026
International career
Years	Team	Apps	(Points)
2018–2019	Italy Under 20	18	(15)
2026	Italy XV	1	(5)
- Correct as of 8 Nov 2020

Damiano Mazza is a professional Italian rugby union player. His usual position is centre and he currently plays for Zebre Parma in United Rugby Championship.

== Early life and career ==
He was born in Montecchio Emilia, on 16 February 1999. Mazza signed for Zebre in May 2022 ahead of the 2022–23 United Rugby Championship. He made his debut in Round 4 of the 2022–23 season against the Stormers.

In 2018 and 2019, Mazza was a part of the Italy Under 20 squad. On 10 January 2023, he was named in Italy A squad for a uncapped test against Romania A. On 30 November 2023, he was called in Italy Under 23 squad for test series against IRFU Combined Academies. On 27 February an updating of squad.

On 30 June 2025, he was called by Gonzalo Quesada to join the Italy squad during the 2025 Tour of Namibia and South Africa.
