= Muhamed Hasa =

Italy international rugby union player

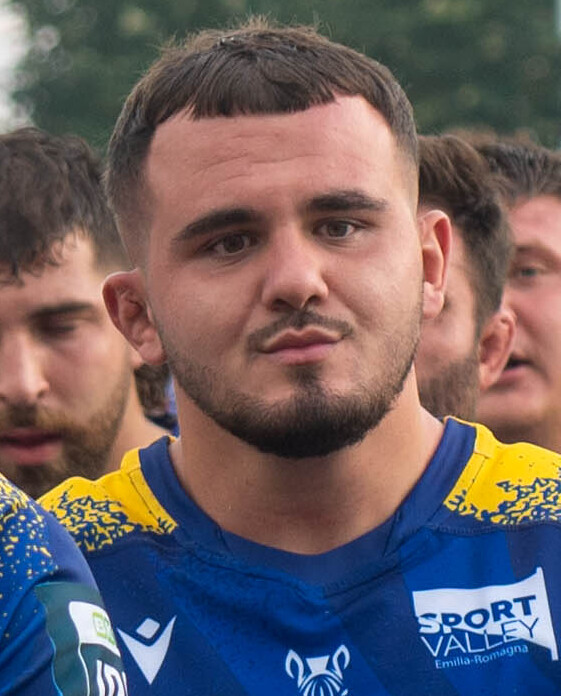
- Hasa in 2025
- Born: 10 September 2001 (age 25) Tirana, Albania
- Height: 1.81 m (5 ft 11 1/2 in)
- Weight: 119 kg (18.7 st; 262 lb)

Rugby union career
- Position: Prop
- Current team: Zebre Parma
Youth career
- A.S. Rugby Milano
Senior career
Years	Team	Apps	(Points)
2019−2020	F.I.R. Academy		
2020–2022	Petrarca Padova	31	(10)
2022–	Zebre Parma	63	(20)
- Correct as of 9 Aug 2026
International career
Years	Team	Apps	(Points)
2020–2021	Italy U20s	6	(0)
2022	Emerging Italy	1	(0)
2025-	Italy	11	(0)
- Correct as of 9 Aug 2026

Muhamed Hasa (born 10 September 2001) is an Albanian-born Italian rugby union player, currently playing for Italian United Rugby Championship side Zebre Parma. His preferred position is prop.

After two seasons with Top10 team Petrarca Padova, Hasa signed for Zebre Parma in July 2022 ahead of the 2022–23 United Rugby Championship He made his debut in Round 1 of the 2022–23 season against the Leinster.

In 2020 and 2021 Hasa was named in Italy U20s squad for annual Six Nations Under 20s Championship. On 26 May 2022, for the match against Netherlands, he was named in the 30-man Emerging Italy squad, for the 2022 July rugby union tests.

He was named in Italy senior team participating in the 2025 Tour of Namibia and South Africa. He made his debut against Namibia in Windhoek.
