= Stephen Varney =

Italy international rugby union player

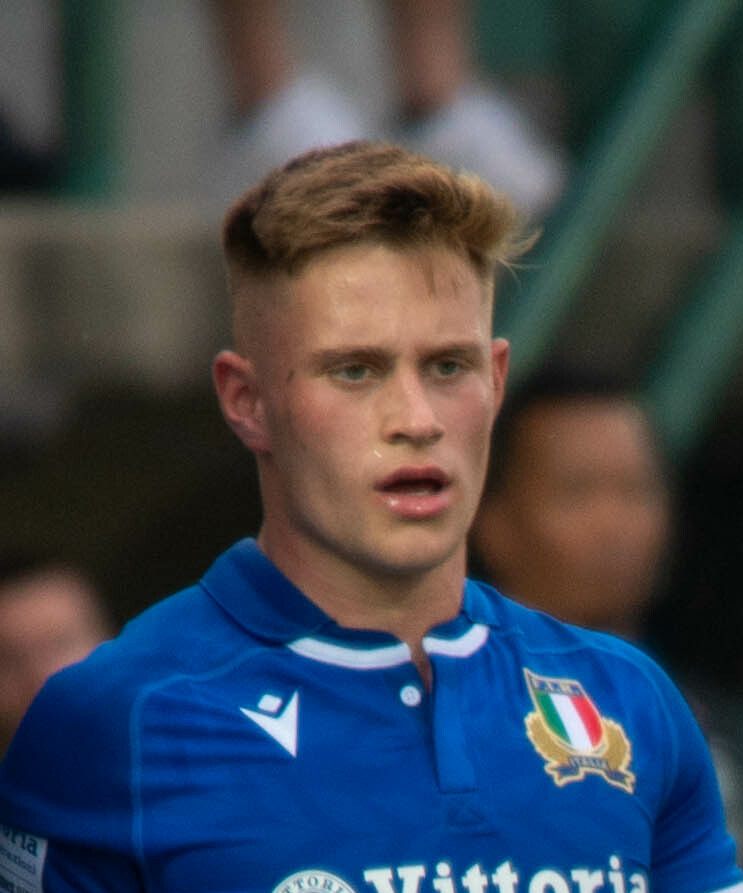
- Varney in 2023
- Full name: Stephen Lorenzo Varney
- Born: 16 May 2001 (age 25) Carmarthen, Wales
- Height: 178 cm (5 ft 10 in)
- Weight: 78 kg (172 lb; 12 st 4 lb)
- School: Hartpury College

Rugby union career
- Position: Scrum-half
- Current team: Exeter Chiefs
Senior career
Years	Team	Apps	(Points)
2019–2024	Gloucester	73	(45)
2024–2025	Vannes	16	(20)
2025–	Exeter Chiefs	24	(35)
- Correct as of 17 Sep 2026
International career
Years	Team	Apps	(Points)
2020	Italy U20s	2	(5)
2020–	Italy	39	(32)
- Correct as of 17 Sep 2026

Stephen Lorenzo Varney (born 16 May 2001) is a professional rugby union player who primarily plays scrum-half for Exeter Chiefs in the Premiership Rugby. Although Welsh-born, he represents Italy at international level, having made his test debut against Scotland in 2020 during the Autumn Nations Cup. Varney previously played for Hartpury. He is a fluent Welsh speaker.

Varney comes from Rhoshill, Pembrokeshire, and played for Crymych RFC. In 2020 he was named for Italy U20 squad, for which he qualifies through his Italian mother, Valeria. Varney was named in the Italy Under 20 squad for the 2020 Six Nations Under 20s Championship.

Varney made his international debut for Italy, from the bench, in 2020 in the Autumn Nations Cup against Scotland. He was named in the Italy's 33-man squad for the 2023 Rugby World Cup.

On 20 October 2024, Varney would leave Gloucester with immediate effect to join French side Vannes in the Top 14 competition. On 20 March 2025, Varney returned to the Premiership in England to join Exeter Chiefs for the 2025–26 season.

In December 2025, Varney signed a contract extension with Exeter Chiefs.

== Statistics ==
=== List of international test tries ===
As of 17 December 2025

Try	Opposing team	Location	Venue	Competition	Date	Result	Score
1	Argentina	Treviso, Italy	Stadio Comunale di Monigo	2021 end-of-year rugby union internationals	13 November 2021	Loss	16 - 37
2	Ireland	Rome, Italy	Stadio Olimpico	2023 Six Nations	25 February 2023	Loss	20 - 34
3	Japan	Treviso, Italy	Stadio Comunale di Monigo	2023 Rugby World Cup warm-up matches	26 August 2023	Win	42 – 21
4	Scotland	Rome, Italy	Stadio Olimpico	2024 Six Nations	9 March 2024	Win	31 - 29
5	Ireland	Rome, Italy	Stadio Olimpico	2025 Six Nations	15 March 2025	Loss	17 - 22
6	Namibia	Windhoek, Namibia	Hage Geingob Rugby Stadium	2025 July Internationals	27 June 2025	Win	6 - 73
