= 2025–26 Benetton Rugby season =

Benetton Rugby
- 2025–26 season
- Head coach: Calum MacRae
- President: Amerino Zatta
- United Rugby Championship: 13th
- Challenge Cup: Quarter-final
- Top try scorer: League: Louis Lynagh – 8 All: Louis Lynagh – 10
- Top points scorer: League: Jacob Umaga – 96; All: Jacob Umaga – 182
- Highest home attendance: 6,327 – RD 16 v Leinster
- Lowest home attendance: 4,806
- Average home attendance: 5,051
Home colours	Away colours

The 2025–26 season was Benetton Treviso's fifth season in the United Rugby Championship, and their 94th season of competitive rugby. Along with competing in the URC and its Scottish–Italian Shield competition, the club also participated in the 2025–26 EPRC Challenge Cup.

== Staff and coaching team ==
=== Players in ===
- (Samoa) So'otala Fa'aso'o from (France) Perpignan
- (New Zealand) Jadin Kingi from (Italy) Mogliano
- (Italy) Destiny Aminu from (Italy) Mogliano
- (Argentina) Giuliano Avaca from (Italy) Mogliano
- (Italy) Marcos Gallorini promoted from Academy
- (Italy) Nicholas Gasperini from (Italy) Mogliano
- (Italy) Giulio Marini from (Italy) Mogliano
- (Italy) Federico Zanandrea from (Italy) Mogliano
- (Australia) John Bryant from (Australia) Queensland Reds (short-term loan)
- (Australia) Richie Asiata from (Australia) Queensland Reds (short-term loan)
- (Australia) Louis Werchon from (Australia) Queensland Reds (short-term loan)
- (Argentina) Tomás Montilla from (Italy) Petrarca
- (Argentina) Nicolás Roger from (Argentina) Tarucas
- (Argentina) Tomás Medina from (Argentina) Tarucas

=== Players out ===
- (Italy) Ignacio Brex to (France) Toulon
- Lautaro Bazán to Argentina Sevens
- (Argentina) Agustín Creevy (retired)
- (Italy) Riccardo Genovese to (Italy) Mogliano
- (Italy) Edoardo Iachizzi to (France) Vannes
- (Italy) Filippo Drago to (Italy) Mogliano
- (Italy) Nicolò Casilio to (Italy) Valorugby Emilia
- (Italy) Marco Zanon to (Italy) Zebre Parma
- (South Africa) Gideon Koegelenberg to (South Africa) Sharks (Currie Cup)
- (Italy) Toa Halafihi to (Italy) Petrarca Padova
- (Italy) Marco Manfredi to (England) Northampton Saints
- (Argentina) Tomás Albornoz to (France) Toulon
- (Argentina) Giuliano Avaca to (Argentina) Dogos XV
- (Argentina) Tomás Montilla to (Argentina) Dogos XV
- (Argentina) Nicolás Roger to (Argentina) Dogos XV

The staff for the 2025–26 season is:

Benetton Rugby management team
Sports director	Antonio Pavanello
Head coach	Marco Bortolami
Assistant coaches	Fabio Ongaro; Calum MacRae; Alessandro Troncon; Dewald Senekal
Team manager	Enrico Ceccato
Assistant Team manager	Corniel Els
Trainers	Jim Molony; Alberto Botter; Mario Disetti; Giorgio Da Lozzo; Riccardo Ton; Alessandro Zanni; Alberto Antonelli
Video analysts	Nicola Gatto; Mattia Geromel

== Senior squad ==
Benetton United Rugby Championship squad (Note: Taking into account signings and departures head of 2024–25 season as listed on List of 2024–25 United Rugby Championship transfers.)
**Props**: (Italy) **Simone Ferrari**; (Argentina) **Thomas Gallo**; (Italy) **Ivan Nemer**; (Italy) **Tiziano Pasquali**; (Italy) **Mirco Spagnolo**; (Argentina) **Nahuel Tetaz Chaparro**; (Italy) **Giosuè Zilocchi**; **Hookers**: (Argentina) Bautista Bernasconi; (Argentina) **Agustín Creevy**; (Tonga) **Siua Maile**; (Italy) **Marco Manfredi**; **Locks**: (Italy) **Niccolò Cannone**; (Italy) **Edoardo Iachizzi**; (South Africa) Gideon Koegelenberg; (Italy) **Federico Ruzza**; (New Zealand) Scott Scrafton; (Zimbabwe) Eli Snyman	**Back row**: (Italy) **Lorenzo Cannone**; (Italy) **Toa Halafihi**; (Italy) **Riccardo Favretto**; (Italy) **Alessandro Izekor**; (Italy) **Michele Lamaro** (cc); (Italy) **Sebastian Negri**; (Italy) **Manuel Zuliani**; **Scrum-halves**: (Argentina) **Lautaro Bazán**; (Italy) Nicolò Casilio; (Italy) **Alessandro Garbisi**; (England) Andy Uren; **Fly-halves**: (Argentina) **Tomás Albornoz**; (Italy) **Leonardo Marin**; (England) **Jacob Umaga**	**Centres**: (Italy) **Ignacio Brex**; (Tonga) **Malakai Fekitoa**; (Italy) **Tommaso Menoncello**; (Italy) **Marco Zanon**; **Wings**: (Italy) **Louis Lynagh**; (Italy) **Paolo Odogwu**; (Argentina) **Ignacio Mendy**; (Fiji) Onisi Ratave; **Fullbacks**: (Italy) **Matt Gallagher**; (South Africa) Rhyno Smith
(cc) denotes the team co-captains, **Bold** denotes internationally capped players.^{*} denotes players qualified to play for Italy on residency or dual nationality.^{L} denotes a player on loan at the club. Players and their allocated positions from the Benetton Rugby website.

=== Additional player squad ===
Benetton Additional Players squad (Note: Academy player on loan to Serie A Elite team Mogliano) (Note: Academy player on loan to Serie A team Rugby Paese) (Note: Academy player on loan to Serie A team Ruggers Tarvisium) (Note: Additional player under contract with Serie A Elite team Mogliano) (Note: Temporary loan to URC team Zebre Parma) (Note: Additional player on loan to Serie A Elite team Rangers Vicenza)
**Props**: (Italy) Destiny Aminu; (Argentina) Enzo Avaca*; (Italy) Marcos Gallorini; (Italy) Riccardo Genovese; **Hookers**: None currently named; **Locks**: (New Zealand) Jadin Kingi*; (South Africa) Jaco Pretorius*	**Back row**: (Fiji) Simon Koroiyadi; (Italy) Giulio Marini; (Italy) Mattia Midena; (Italy) Antony Miranda; (Italy) Matteo Rubinato; **Scrum-halves**: (Italy) Lorenzo Casilio; **Fly-halves**: (Argentina) Giuliano Avaca*	**Centres**: (Italy) Filippo Drago; (Italy) Dewi Passarella; (Italy) Federico Zanandrea; **Wings**: (South Africa) Jacques Cloete*; (Italy) Marco Scalabrin; **Fullbacks**: None currently named
(c) denotes the team captain, **Bold** denotes internationally capped players.^{*} denotes players qualified to play for Italy on residency or dual nationality. Players and their allocated positions from the Benetton Rugby website and F.I.R. website.

== United Rugby Championship ==
=== Matches ===
27 September 2025	(1 BP) Connacht (Ireland)	26–15	(Italy) Benetton	The Sportsground, Galway
19:45	Try: Ioane 8' c Sean Naughton 19' m Tierney-Martin 46' c Jansen 73' c Con: Forde (3) 9', 47', 74'; Cards: Mullins (yellow card) 26'	Report	Try: Louis Lynagh 41' m Garbisi 80+1' c Con: Umaga 80+2'; Pen: Umaga 16'; Cards: Fekitoa (yellow card) 8'; Lamaro (yellow card) 44'	Attendance: 3,928; Referee: Christopher Allison (South Africa)

4 October 2025	Benetton (Italy)	16–14	(Scotland) Glasgow Warriors (1 BP)	Stadio Comunale di Monigo, Treviso
17:30	Try: Menoncello 51' c Con: Umaga 53'; Pen: Umaga (2) 26', 71'; Drop: Smith 80+1'; Cards: Cannone (yellow card) 67'	Report	Try: Oguntibeju 19'; McKay 29'; Con: A. Hastings (2) 20', 30'	Attendance: 4,806; Referee: Ben Connor (Wales)

11 October 2025	(1 BP) Benetton (Italy)	41–15	(South Africa) Lions	Stadio Comunale di Monigo, Treviso
15:00	Try: Smith 8' m Lynagh (4) 14' m, 30' c, 71' c, 80+3'; Ferrari 20' c Con: Umaga (3) 21', 31', 72'; Smith 80+4'; Pen: Umaga 42'; Cards: Gallo (yellow card) 53'; Avaca (yellow card) 80'	Report	Try: Ntlabakanye 27' c Van Vuuren 78' m Con: Smith 28'; Pen: Smith 2'; Cards: Jonker (yellow card) 69'; Horn (yellow card) 80'+2	Attendance: 4,850; Referee: Andrew Brace (Ireland)

17 October 2025	(1 BP) Edinburgh (Scotland)	43–0	(Italy) Benetton	Edinburgh Rugby Stadium
19:45	Try: van der Merwe 5' c Richardson (2) 11' c, 57' m Graham (2) 39' c, 78' m O'Conor 65' c Bradbury 73' m Con: Scott (3) 6', 11', 40'; Thompson 66'	Report	Cards: Fekitoa (yellow card) 44'; Garbisi (yellow card) 57'	Attendance: 6,763; Referee: Ben Breakspear (Wales)

25 October 2025	Benetton (Italy)	16–31	(South Africa) Stormers	Stadio Comunale di Monigo, Treviso
17:30	Try: Lynagh 30' c Con: Umaga 31'; Pen: Umaga (3) 15', 18', 35'	Report	Try: Sandi 6' m Matthee 48' c Porthen 80' c Con: Matthee (2) 49', 81'; Pen: Matthee (4) 20', 45', 53', 72'	Attendance: 4,903; Referee: Hollie Davidson (Scotland)

28 November 2025	(1 BP) Ulster (Ireland)	47–13	(Italy) Benetton	Ravenhill Stadium, Belfast
19:45	Try: Baloucoune (2) 10' m, 77' c Kok (2) 21' c, 58' c Hume 52' c Sheridan 68' c Penalty try 63'; Con: Doak (3) 22', 53', 59'; Flannery (2) 68', 78'	Report	Try: Bernasconi 28' c Con: Umaga 29'; Pen: Umaga (2) 15', 43'; Cards: Ratave (yellow card) 63'	Attendance: 11,517; Referee: Sam Grove-White (Scotland)

20 December 2025	Benetton (Italy)	21–15	(Italy) Zebre Parma (1 BP)	Stadio Comunale di Monigo, Treviso
14:00	Try: Mendy 26' c Gasperini 65' m Con: Umaga 26'; Pen: Umaga (3) 17', 30', 46'; Cards: Menoncello (yellow card) 51'	Report	Try: Ferrari 52' m Gesi 68' c Con: Montemauri 69'; Pen: Montemauri 38'	Attendance: 5,000; Referee: Gianluca Gnecchi (Italy)

27 December 2025	Zebre Parma (Italy)	23–37	(Italy) Benetton (1 BP)	Stadio Sergio Lanfranchi, Parma
14:30	Try: Gesi 43' c Faissal 79' c Con: Da Re 44'; Dominguez 80'; Pen: Da Re (3) 8', 13', 31'; Cards: Ferrari (yellow card) 7'; Mazza (yellow card) 53'	Report	Try: Mendy 2' c Penalty try 53'; Odogwu 62' c Werchon 70' c Con: Umaga (3) 3', 63', 71'; Pen: Umaga (3) 7', 18', 40+1'; Cards: Lamaro (yellow card) 25'	Attendance: 4,500; Referee: Clara Munarini (Italy)

3 January 2026	(1 BP) Benetton (Italy)	14–15	(Scotland) Edinburgh	Stadio Comunale di Monigo, Treviso
17:30	Try: Gallo 52' c Fekitoa 57' c Con: Umaga (2/2) 53', 58'	Report	Try: Vellacott 21' c Graham 48' m Con: Thompson (1/2) 22'; Pen: Thompson 29'	Attendance: 4,857; Referee: Peter Martin (Ireland)

24 January 2026	Cardiff (Wales)	17–8	(Italy) Benetton	Cardiff Arms Park
19:45	Try: McNally 49' m Pen: Sheedy (3) 13', 16', 60'; Lloyd 80+1'; Cards: Mann (yellow card) 26'	Report	Try: Ruzza 66' m Pen: Smith 46'	Attendance: 8,052; Referee: Sam Grove-White (Scotland)

30 January 2026	Benetton (Italy)	20–20	(Wales) Scarlets	Stadio Comunale di Monigo, Treviso
19:45	Try: Odogwu 37' c Garbisi 71' c Con: Smith 38'; Roger 72'; Pen: Smith (2) 25', 30'	Report	Try: Davies 42' c Lewis 57' m Page 75' m Con: Leggatt-Jones (1/3) 43'; Pen: Leggatt-Jones 15'	Referee: Andrew Brace (Ireland)

28 February 2026	Dragons (Wales)	15–15	(Italy) Benetton	Rodney Parade, Newport
17:30	Try: Douglas 11' c Inisi 80+1' m Con: O'Brien 12'; Pen: O'Brien 69'; Cards: Douglas (red card) 33'; Inisi (yellow card) 39'	Report	Try: Ratave (2) 2' m, 29' m Gallagher 50' m Cards: Fekitoa (yellow card) 15'	Attendance: 7,106; Referee: Eoghan Cross (Ireland)

21 March 2026	(1 BP) Benetton (Italy)	31–19	(Wales) Ospreys	Stadio Comunale di Monigo, Treviso
15:00	Try: Maile 4' c Mendy 29' c Ratave (2) 46' m, 54' m Umaga 66' c Con: Umaga (3/5) 5', 30', 67'; Cards: Uren (yellow card) 71'; Fekitoa (yellow card) 73'	Report	Try: Williams (2) 13' m, 43' c Davies 80' c Con: Walsh (2/3) 44', 80'; Cards: Moriarty (yellow card) 51' (red card) 64'	Attendance: 4,879; Referee: Ian Kenny (Scotland)

27 March 2026	(1 BP) Glasgow Warriors (Scotland)	31–10	(Italy) Benetton	Scotstoun Stadium, Glasgow
19:45	Try: Matthews 38' c Watson 42' c Williamson 60' m Stephen 67' m Talakai 73' c Con: Hastings 39', 43'; Lancaster 74'	Report	Try: Odogwu 15' c Con: Smith 16'; Pen: Smith 40+1'; Cards: Odogwu (yellow card) 23'	Attendance: 7,266; Referee: Ben Breakspear (Wales)

18 April 2026	Benetton (Italy)	15–45	(Ireland) Munster (1 BP)	Stadio Comunale di Monigo, Treviso
19:45	Try: Bernasconi 32' c Garbisi 80' m Con: Umaga (1/2) 52'; Pen: Umaga 28'	Report	Try: Nash 7' c Farrell 17' m Coombes 34' c Kleyn 46' c Kendellen 56' m Beirne 59' c Gleeson 78' c Con: Crowley 8', 35', 46', 59', 79'; Cards: Crowley (yellow card) 63'; Casey (yellow card) 66'	Attendance: 5,000; Referee: Ben Whitehouse (Wales)

25 April 2026	(1 BP) Benetton (Italy)	29–26	(Ireland) Leinster (2 BP)	Stadio Comunale di Monigo, Treviso
19:45	Try: Garbisi 9' m Mendy 47' c Gasperini (2) 61' c, 71' c Con: Umaga (3/4) 48', 62', 72'; Pen: Umaga 80+3'	Report	Try: O'Tighearnaigh 14' c Van der Flier 36' c Gibson-Park 43' m Frawley 66' c Con: Byrne (2/3) 15', 37'; Prendergast (1/1) 67'	Attendance: 6,327; Referee: Morné Ferreira (South Africa)

9 May 2026	(1 BP) Sharks (South Africa)	46–7	(Italy) Benetton	Kings Park Stadium, Durban
15:00	Try: Van der Merwe (2) 11' m, 40' m Julius (3) 21' m, 59' c, 62' c Kolisi 27' m Esterhuizen 43' c Bester 80'm Con: Davids (1/5) 44'; Smith (2/3) 59', 63'	Report	Try: Tizzano 78' c Con: Garbisi 79'; Cards: Umaga (red card) 37'; Bernasconi (yellow card) 25'	Attendance: 11,809; Referee: Ben Breakspear (Wales)

16 May 2026	(1 BP) Bulls (South Africa)	45–19	(Italy) Benetton	Loftus Versfeld Stadium, Pretoria
15:00	Try: Petersen (2) 4' c, 57' c le Roux 13' c Grobbelaar 29' m Wiese 38' c Gumede 63' c Nortjé 75' m Con: Pollard (5/7) 5', 13', 38', 58', 64'	Report	Try: Lynagh (2) 19' m, 42' c Smith 40' c Con: Smith (2/3) 40', 43'; Cards: Garbisi (yellow card) 32'	Attendance: 10,521; Referee: Craig Evans (Wales)

=== Standings ===
Pos	Team	Pld	W	D	L	PF	PA	PD	TF	TA	TB	LB	Pts	Qualification
1	Glasgow Warriors	18	13	0	5	479	338	+141	72	48	11	2	65	Qualification for the Champions Cup and knockout stage
2	Leinster (CH)	18	12	0	6	515	370	+145	77	51	13	2	63	Qualification for the Champions Cup and knockout stage
3	Stormers	18	12	1	5	504	344	+160	63	48	9	1	60	Qualification for the Champions Cup and knockout stage
4	Bulls (RU)	18	12	0	6	576	406	+170	82	59	10	1	59	Qualification for the Champions Cup and knockout stage
5	Munster	18	11	0	7	396	376	+20	59	51	8	3	55	Qualification for the Champions Cup and knockout stage
6	Cardiff	18	11	0	7	353	372	−19	52	52	7	4	55	Qualification for the Champions Cup and knockout stage
7	Lions	18	10	1	7	532	473	+59	73	70	9	3	54	Qualification for the Champions Cup and knockout stage
8	Connacht	18	10	0	8	442	395	+47	62	56	10	4	54	Qualification for the Champions Cup and knockout stage
9	Ulster	18	9	1	8	494	420	+74	72	60	10	4	52	Qualification for the Challenge Cup
10	Sharks	18	8	1	9	467	428	+39	71	57	9	3	46	Qualification for the Challenge Cup
11	Ospreys	18	7	2	9	376	454	−78	55	69	4	3	39	Qualification for the Challenge Cup
12	Edinburgh	18	7	0	11	362	439	−77	57	66	6	4	38	Qualification for the Challenge Cup
13	Benetton	18	6	2	10	327	493	−166	41	71	4	1	33	Qualification for the Challenge Cup
14	Scarlets	18	4	2	12	361	460	−99	52	63	3	5	28	Qualification for the Challenge Cup
15	Dragons	18	3	4	11	350	481	−131	46	71	4	4	28	Qualification for the Challenge Cup
16	Zebre	18	2	0	16	312	587	−275	43	85	3	4	15	Qualification for the Challenge Cup

Updated to match(es) played on 16 May 2026. Source: UnitedRugby.com
Rules for classification: Tiebreakers for teams tied on points: 1) Number of matches won 2) The difference between points for and points against 3) The number of tries scored 4) The most points scored 5) The difference between tries for and tries against 6) The fewest red cards received 7) The fewest yellow cards received.

2025–26 United Rugby Championship Regional Shield tables
(Italy) (Scotland) Italian x Scottish Shield
	Team	P	W	D	L	PF	PA	PD	TF	TA	TBP	LBP	Pts	Pos overall
1	(Scotland) Glasgow Warriors	6	5	0	1	163	72	+91	25	9	4	1	25	1
2	(Scotland) Edinburgh	6	3	0	3	132	120	+12	20	17	3	1	16	12
3	(Italy) Benetton	6	3	0	3	98	141	–43	10	19	1	1	14	13
4	(Italy) Zebre Parma	6	1	0	5	130	190	–60	17	26	2	3	9	16
If teams are level at any stage, tiebreakers are applied in the following order: 1. number of matches won 2. the difference between points for and points against 3. the number of tries scored 4. the most points scored 5. the difference between tries for and tries against 6. the fewest red cards received 7. the fewest yellow cards received
Green background indicates teams currently leading the regional shield. Upon the conclusion of the regular season, these teams win their respective regional shields. (S) : URC Shield champion

== EPRC Challenge Cup ==
=== Pool 2 table ===
EPCR Challenge Cup Pool 2
Pos	Team	Pld	W	D	L	PF	PA	PD	TF	TA	TB	LB	Pts	Qualification
1	(Italy) Benetton (2)	4	4	0	0	182	89	+93	24	11	3	0	19	Home round of 16
2	(England) Newcastle Red Bulls (6)	4	3	0	1	75	78	−3	11	11	1	0	13	Home round of 16
3	(Wales) Dragons (13)	4	2	0	2	96	148	−52	14	21	1	0	9	Away round of 16
4	(France) Perpignan (16)	4	1	1	2	111	107	+4	14	14	1	1	8	Away round of 16
5	(South Africa) Lions	4	1	1	2	90	93	−3	11	12	1	1	8	
6	(France) Lyon	4	0	0	4	87	126	−39	13	17	1	2	3	

Source: EPCR
Rules for classification: Tiebreakers for teams tied on points: 1) Number of matches won; 2) Difference between points for and against; 3) Total number of points for; 4) Aggregate number of points scored in matches between tied teams; 5) Number of matches won excluding the first match, then the second and so on until the tie is settled.

=== Pool matches ===
6 December 2025	Lions (South Africa)	18–26	(Italy) Benetton	Ellis Park Stadium, Johannesburg
15:00	Try: Mpeku 37' c Venter 45' m Con: Smith (1/2) 38'; Pen: Smith (2/3) 9', 57'; Cards: Mpeku (yellow card) 66'	Report	Try: Smith 6' m Marin 71' c, 75' m Con: Albornoz (1/2) 72'; Pen: Umaga (1/2) 13'; Albornoz (1/1) 60'; Drop: Albornoz (1/1) 79'	Attendance: 4,120; Referee: Kevin Bralley (France)

13 December 2025	(1 BP) Benetton (Italy)	44–31	(France) Perpignan	Stadio Comunale di Monigo, Treviso
14:00	Try: Odogwu (2) 8' c, 24' c Izekor 19' c Bernasconi 49' c Mendy 59' c Con: Albornoz (3/3) 9', 19', 25'; Umaga (2/2) 50', 60'; Pen: Albornoz (1/1) 14'; Umaga (2/2) 67', 78'	Report	Try: Duguivalu 21' c Poulet 34' c Fahy 63' m Con: Reus (2/3) 21', 35'; Pen: Reus (4/5) 3', 16', 46', 53'	Attendance: 4,151; Referee: Ben Connor (Wales)

10 January 2026	(1 BP) Benetton (Italy)	74–21	(Wales) Dragons	Stadio Comunale di Monigo, Treviso
18:30	Try: Izekor 14' c Ratave 18' c Fekitoa 33' m Odogwu (2) 37' m, 55' c Umaga (2) 40' c, 64' c Lynagh (2) 51' m, 67' c Marin (2) 75' c, 80+2' c Con: Umaga (8/11) 15', 19', 41', 56', 65', 68', 75', 80+3'; Pen: Umaga (1/1) 3'	Report	Try: Burrows 29' c Dyer 58' c Lewis-Hughes 78' c Con: De Beer (2/2) 30', 59'; J. Lloyd (1/1) 78'	Attendance: 3,754; Referee: Benoit Rousselet (France)

18 January 2026	Lyon (France)	19–38	(Italy) Benetton (1 BP)	Mahmut Stadium, Lyon
14:00	Try: Parisien (2) 3' c, 7' c Cretin 58' m Con: Jackson (2/2) 4', 8'	Report	Try: Maile (2) 20' c, 39' c Fekitoa 29' c Ratave 35' c Spagnolo 62' c Con: Smith (5/5) 21', 30', 36', 40', 63'; Pen: Smith (1/1) 10'	Attendance: 14,659; Referee: Sara Cox (England)

=== Knockout stage ===
Benetton qualified for a home tie in the round of 16 when they confirmed a top two finish in Pool 2 in Round 3.

Round of 16
1	(France) Montpellier	53
16	(France) Perpignan	13
8	(Ireland) Connacht	29
9	(South Africa) Sharks	12
5	(Italy) Zebre Parma	31
12	(France) Pau	15
4	(France) Stade Français	31
13	(Wales) Dragons	36
3	(Ireland) Ulster	28
14	(Wales) Ospreys	24
6	(England) Newcastle Red Bulls	18
11	(France) La Rochelle	26
2	(Italy) Benetton	38
15	(Wales) Cardiff	35
7	(England) Exeter Chiefs	31
10	(Ireland) Munster	21

Quarter-finals
1	(France) Montpellier	45
8	(Ireland) Connacht	22
5	(Italy) Zebre Parma	32
13	(Wales) Dragons	35
3	(Ireland) Ulster	41
11	(France) La Rochelle	24
2	(Italy) Benetton	41
7	(England) Exeter Chiefs	44

Semi-finals
1	(France) Montpellier	18
13	(Wales) Dragons	12
3	(Ireland) Ulster	29
7	(England) Exeter Chiefs	12

Final
1	(France) Montpellier	59
3	(Ireland) Ulster	26

Round of 16

4 April 2026	Benetton (Italy) (2)	38–35	(15) (Wales) Cardiff	Stadio Comunale di Monigo, Treviso
18:30	Try: Menoncello (2) 0' c, 41' m Umaga (2) 2' c, 13' c Gallo 12' c Ratave 28' m Con: Umaga (4/6) 0', 3', 12', 14'; Cards: Umaga (yellow card) 45'	Report	Try: Belcher 8' c Beetham (2) 21' c, 53' c Lawrence 39' c Bevan 44' c Con: Sheedy (5/5) 9', 22', 40', 45', 54'	Attendance: 5,000; Referee: Kevin Bralley (France)

Quarter-final

12 April 2026	Benetton (Italy) (2)	41–44	(7) (England) Exeter Chiefs	Stadio Comunale di Monigo, Treviso
13:30	Try: Cannone 5' c Umaga (2) 20' c, 65' c Ratave 37'c Bernasconi 45' c Con: Umaga (5/5) 6', 21', 38', 46', 66'; Pen: Umaga (2/2) 42', 63'; Cards: Ratave (yellow card) 15'	Report	Try: Woodburn 8' c Feyi-Waboso 24' c Skinner 42' c Zambonin 48' c Con: Slade (4/4) 9', 25', 43', 49'; Pen: Slade (3/3) 28', 70', 79'	Attendance: 5,687; Referee: Luc Ramos (France)
