= 2024–25 Benetton Rugby season =

Benetton Rugby
- Full name: Benetton Rugby
- Union: Federazione Italiana Rugby
- Nickname: Treviso
- Founded: 1932; 94 years ago
- Location: Treviso, Italy
- Ground: Stadio Comunale di Monigo (Capacity: 5,000)
- President: Amerino Zatta
- Coach: Marco Bortolami
- Captain(s): Eli Snyman; Michele Lamaro
- League: United Rugby Championship
- 2024-25: 10th
1st kit	2nd kit

Official website
- www.benettonrugby.it
- Current season

The 2024–25 season was Benetton Treviso's fourth season in the United Rugby Championship, and their 93rd season of competitive rugby. Along with competing in the URC and its Scottish-Italian Shield competition, the club also participated in the 2024-25 European Rugby Champions Cup.

The Italian side narrowly missed out on the URC play-offs after a final day defeat to Munster dropped them out of playoff contention to their final position of 10th in the standings. In the Scottish-Italian Shield, Benetton were runners-up to winners Glasgow Warriors. In Europe, Benetton successfully emerged from their pool in the 2024-25 European Rugby Champions Cup, but narrowly lost their Round of 16 knockout tie away to French side Castres, 39 - 37.

Benetton Rugby drew an average home attendance of 4,447 in the 2024-25 URC season.

== Staff and coaching team ==
The staff for the 2024–25 season is:

Benetton Rugby management team
Sports director	Antonio Pavanello
Head coach	Marco Bortolami
Assistant coaches	Fabio Ongaro; Calum MacRae; Alessandro Troncon; Dewald Senekal
Team manager	Enrico Ceccato
Assistant Team manager	Corniel Els
Trainers	Jim Molony; Alberto Botter; Mario Disetti; Giorgio Da Lozzo; Riccardo Ton; Alessandro Zanni; Alberto Antonelli
Video analysts	Nicola Gatto; Mattia Geromel

== Senior squad ==
Benetton United Rugby Championship squad (Note: Taking into account signings and departures head of 2024–25 season as listed on List of 2024–25 United Rugby Championship transfers.)
**Props**: (Italy) **Simone Ferrari**; (Argentina) **Thomas Gallo**; (Italy) **Ivan Nemer**; (Italy) **Tiziano Pasquali**; (Italy) **Mirco Spagnolo**; (Argentina) **Nahuel Tetaz Chaparro**; (Italy) **Giosuè Zilocchi**; **Hookers**: (Argentina) Bautista Bernasconi; (Argentina) **Agustín Creevy**; (Tonga) **Siua Maile**; (Italy) **Marco Manfredi**; **Locks**: (Italy) **Niccolò Cannone**; (Italy) **Edoardo Iachizzi**; (South Africa) Gideon Koegelenberg; (Italy) **Federico Ruzza**; (New Zealand) Scott Scrafton; (Zimbabwe) Eli Snyman	**Back row**: (Italy) **Lorenzo Cannone**; (Italy) **Toa Halafihi**; (Italy) **Riccardo Favretto**; (Italy) **Alessandro Izekor**; (Italy) **Michele Lamaro** (cc); (Italy) **Sebastian Negri**; (Italy) **Manuel Zuliani**; **Scrum-halves**: (Argentina) **Lautaro Bazán**; (Italy) Nicolò Casilio; (Italy) **Alessandro Garbisi**; (England) Andy Uren; **Fly-halves**: (Argentina) **Tomás Albornoz**; (Italy) **Leonardo Marin**; (England) **Jacob Umaga**	**Centres**: (Italy) **Ignacio Brex**; (Tonga) **Malakai Fekitoa**; (Italy) **Tommaso Menoncello**; (Italy) **Marco Zanon**; **Wings**: (Italy) **Louis Lynagh**; (Italy) **Paolo Odogwu**; (Argentina) **Ignacio Mendy**; (Fiji) Onisi Ratave; **Fullbacks**: (Italy) **Matt Gallagher**; (South Africa) Rhyno Smith
(cc) denotes the team co-captains, **Bold** denotes internationally capped players.^{*} denotes players qualified to play for Italy on residency or dual nationality.^{L} denotes a player on loan at the club. Players and their allocated positions from the Benetton Rugby website.

=== Additional player squad ===
Benetton Additional Players squad (Note: Academy player on loan to Serie A Elite team Mogliano) (Note: Academy player on loan to Serie A team Rugby Paese) (Note: Academy player on loan to Serie A team Ruggers Tarvisium) (Note: Additional player under contract with Serie A Elite team Mogliano) (Note: Temporary loan to URC team Zebre Parma) (Note: Additional player on loan to Serie A Elite team Rangers Vicenza)
**Props**: (Italy) Destiny Aminu; (Argentina) Enzo Avaca*; (Italy) Marcos Gallorini; (Italy) Riccardo Genovese; **Hookers**: None currently named; **Locks**: (New Zealand) Jadin Kingi*; (South Africa) Jaco Pretorius*	**Back row**: (Fiji) Simon Koroiyadi; (Italy) Giulio Marini; (Italy) Mattia Midena; (Italy) Antony Miranda; (Italy) Matteo Rubinato; **Scrum-halves**: (Italy) Lorenzo Casilio; **Fly-halves**: (Argentina) Giuliano Avaca*	**Centres**: (Italy) Filippo Drago; (Italy) Dewi Passarella; (Italy) Federico Zanandrea; **Wings**: (South Africa) Jacques Cloete*; (Italy) Marco Scalabrin; **Fullbacks**: None currently named
(c) denotes the team captain, **Bold** denotes internationally capped players.^{*} denotes players qualified to play for Italy on residency or dual nationality. Players and their allocated positions from the Benetton Rugby website and F.I.R. website.

== Transfers ==
=== Players in ===
- (Italy) Louis Lynagh from (England) Harlequins
- (Italy) Matt Gallagher from (England) Bath
- (Italy) Riccardo Genovese from (Italy) Zebre Parma
- (Italy) Marco Manfredi from (Italy) Zebre Parma
- (Argentina) Lautaro Bazán from (Italy) Rovigo Delta
- (Fiji) Simon Koroiyadi from (England) Leicester Tigers
- (Argentina) Agustín Creevy from (England) Sale Sharks

=== Players out ===
- (Italy) Giacomo Da Re to (Italy) Zebre Parma
- (South Africa) Dewaldt Duvenage to (South Africa) Western Province
- (Scotland) Sam Hidalgo-Clyne retired
- (Samoa) Henry Stowers released
- (England) Marcus Watson retired
- (Italy) Giovanni Pettinelli to (Italy) Mogliano Veneto
- (Italy) Marco Lazzaroni to (Italy) Mogliano Veneto
- (Italy) Federico Zani retired
- (Italy) Giacomo Nicotera to (France) Stade Français Paris
- (Italy) Edoardo Padovani to (Italy) Mogliano Veneto
- (Italy) Gianmarco Lucchesi to (France) Toulon
- (Argentina) Joaquin Riera to (France) Rouen

== United Rugby Championship ==
=== Overall standings ===
Pos	Team	Pld	W	D	L	PF	PA	PD	TF	TA	TB	LB	Pts	Qualification
1	Leinster (CH)	18	16	0	2	542	256	+286	79	35	11	1	76	Qualifies for home URC quarter-final; Qualification for the 2025–26 Champions Cup
2	Bulls (RU)	18	14	0	4	542	361	+181	71	44	9	3	68	Qualifies for home URC quarter-final; Qualification for the 2025–26 Champions Cup
3	Sharks	18	13	0	5	436	402	+34	55	59	7	3	62	Qualifies for home URC quarter-final; Qualification for the 2025–26 Champions Cup
4	Glasgow Warriors	18	11	0	7	468	327	+141	70	40	10	5	59	Qualifies for home URC quarter-final; Qualification for the 2025–26 Champions Cup
5	Stormers	18	10	0	8	507	418	+89	66	57	11	4	55	Qualifies for URC quarter-final; Qualification for the 2025–26 Champions Cup
6	Munster	18	9	0	9	444	429	+15	67	59	11	4	51	Qualifies for URC quarter-final; Qualification for the 2025–26 Champions Cup
7	Edinburgh	18	8	1	9	471	407	+64	66	57	9	6	49	Qualifies for URC quarter-final; Qualification for the 2025–26 Champions Cup
8	Scarlets	18	9	1	8	427	382	+45	50	52	6	4	48	Qualifies for URC quarter-final; Qualification for the 2025–26 Champions Cup
9	Cardiff	18	8	1	9	409	477	−68	63	65	10	3	47	Qualification for the 2025–26 Challenge Cup
10	Benetton	18	9	1	8	393	478	−85	50	65	7	1	46	Qualification for the 2025–26 Challenge Cup
11	Lions	18	8	0	10	402	440	−38	53	60	5	3	40	Qualification for the 2025–26 Challenge Cup
12	Ospreys	18	7	1	10	437	454	−17	60	63	6	4	40	Qualification for the 2025–26 Challenge Cup
13	Connacht	18	6	0	12	420	472	−52	64	62	9	6	39	Qualification for the 2025–26 Challenge Cup
14	Ulster	18	7	0	11	414	506	−92	59	72	5	5	38	Qualification for the 2025–26 Challenge Cup
15	Zebre Parma	18	5	1	12	302	503	−201	38	72	3	4	29	Qualification for the 2025–26 Challenge Cup
16	Dragons	18	1	0	17	335	637	−302	43	92	1	4	9	Qualification for the 2025–26 Challenge Cup

Source: UnitedRugby.com
Rules for classification: Tiebreakers for teams tied on points: 1) Number of matches won 2) The difference between points for and points against 3) The number of tries scored 4) The most points scored 5) The difference between tries for and tries against 6) The fewest red cards received 7) The fewest yellow cards received.

=== URC Italian Scottish Shield ===
2024–25 United Rugby Championship Regional Shield Pools
(Italy) (Scotland) Italian x Scottish Shield
	Team	P	W	D	L	PF	PA	PD	TF	TA	TBP	LBP	Pts	Pos overall
1	(Scotland) Glasgow Warriors (S)	6	4	0	2	136	76	+60	20	9	3	1	20	4
2	(Italy) Benetton	6	4	0	2	132	139	–7	19	19	3	0	19	10
3	(Scotland) Edinburgh	6	2	1	3	134	141	–7	18	20	1	2	13	7
4	(Italy) Zebre Parma	6	1	1	4	88	124	–46	9	18	0	1	7	15
If teams are level at any stage, tiebreakers are applied in the following order: 1. number of matches won 2. the difference between points for and points against 3. the number of tries scored 4. the most points scored 5. the difference between tries for and tries against 6. the fewest red cards received 7. the fewest yellow cards received
Green background indicates teams currently leading the regional shield. Upon the conclusion of the regular season, these teams win their respective regional shields. (S) : URC Shield champion

=== Round 1 ===
21 September 2024
20:35

Benetton (Italy)	20–20	(Wales) Scarlets
Try: Ratave (2) 21' m, 78' m Smith 31' c Con: Umaga 32' (1/3); Pen: Umaga 48'		Try: Page 40' c Taylor 52' c Con: Lloyd (2/2) 41', 53'; Pen: Lloyd (2) 59', 67'

Stadio Monigo, Treviso
Attendance: 3,243
Referee: Ian Kenny (Scotland)

=== Round 2 ===
27 September 2024
19:35

(1 BP) Glasgow Warriors (Scotland)	42–10	(Italy) Benetton
Try: Steyn 5' c, 63' c M. Fagerson 16' c Darge 46' c Dobie 50'; Ferrie 80'+1 c Con: Hastings (2/2) 6', 17'; Weir (4/4) 47', 51', 64' 80'+3		Try: Spagnolo 32'; Con: Umaga (1/1) 34'; Pen: Umaga (1) 43'

Scotstoun Stadium, Glasgow
Attendance: 6,441
Referee: Marius van der Westhuizen (South Africa)

=== Round 3 ===
5 October 2024
18:15

Benetton (Italy)	5–35	(Ireland) Leinster (1 BP)
Try: Manfredi 65' m		Try: Penalty try 9'; Frawley 11' c Conan 18' c Doris 25' c Barron 79' c Con: Frawley (3/3) 11', 19', 26'; R. Byrne (1/1) 80'

Stadio Monigo, Treviso
Attendance: 4,391
Referee: Craig Evans (Wales)

=== Round 4 ===
12 October 2024
16:00

(1 BP) Benetton (Italy)	38–10	(South Africa) Sharks
Try: Odogwu 23' c Smith (2) 29' c, 68' c Mendy 37' c Marin 75' c Con: Umaga (5/5) 24', 31', 38', 69', 76'; Pen: Umaga (1) 10'		Try: Mchunu 80' c Con: Cronjé 80' (1/1); Pen: Masuku 17'

Stadio Monigo, Treviso
Attendance: 3,900
Referee: Sam Grove-White (Scotland)

=== Round 5 ===
19 October 2024
19:35

Dragons (Wales)	21–31	(Italy) Benetton (1 BP)
Try: Westwood 26' c L. Evans 49' c Lewis-Hughes 72' c Con: L. Evans (2/2) 28', 50'. O'Brien 73'		Try: Bernasconi 36' c Avaca 45' c Manfredi 60' c Cannone 67' c Con: Umaga (2/2) 37', 47'; Albornoz (2/2) 61', 68'; Pen: Umaga 32'

Rodney Parade, Newport
Attendance: 4,132
Referee: Peter Martin, Ireland

=== Round 6 ===
25 October 2024
19:35

(1 BP) Benetton (Italy)	15–17	(South Africa) Bulls
Pen: Albornoz (4) 1', 34', 62', 72'; Smith 3'		Try: Ludwig 67' c van der Merwe 77' c Con: Kriel (2/2) 68', 79'; Pen: Johannes 22'

Stadio Monigo, Treviso
Attendance: 4,312
Referee: Eoghan Cross, Ireland

=== Round 7 ===
30 November 2024
19:35

(1 BP) Edinburgh (Scotland)	50–33	(Italy) Benetton (1 BP)
Try: van der Merwe 1' c Muncaster (2) 14' c, 74' c Bradbury (2) 19' c, 23' c Hill 42' c Price 56' m Con: Thompson (5/6) 2', 15', 20', 24', 42'; Healy 75'; Pen: Healy 80'		Try: Odogwu 42' m Creevy (2) 47' c, 53' c Izekor 62' c Fekitoa 69' c Con: Umaga (4/5) 48', 54', 63', 70'; Pen: Fekitoa 80'

Hive Stadium, Edinburgh
Attendance: 6,057
Referee: Ben Breakspear (Wales)

=== Round 8 ===
21 December 2024
14:00

Benetton (Italy)	11–10	(Italy) Zebre Parma (1 BP)
Try: Marin 29' m Pen: Marin 58'; Smith 81'	Report	Try: Zambonin 71' c Con: Da Re 72'; Pen: Da Re 37'

Stadio Monigo, Treviso
Attendance: 5,000
Referee: Federico Vedovelli (ITA)

=== Round 9 ===
28 December 2024
16:00

Zebre Parma (Italy)	12-24	(Italy) Benetton (1 BP}
Try: Fischetti 19' c Gesi 47' m Con: Da Re (1/2) 21'	Report	Try: Maile (2) 24' m, 36' m Brex 65' c Marin 85' c Con: Smith (2/4) 66', 86'

Stadio Sergio Lanfranchi, Parma
Attendance: 5,000

=== Round 10 ===
24 January 2025
19:35

Ospreys (Wales)	43–0	(Italy) Benetton
Try: Walsh (2) 09' c, 62' c Kasende 21' c K. Williams 27' c Morse 75' m Hardy 80' c Con: O. Williams (4/4) 09', 22', 28', 63'; Walsh (1/2) 81'; Pen: O. Williams 15'

Swansea.com Stadium, Swansea
Attendance: 2,832

=== Round 11 ===
15 February 2025
18:15

(1 BP) Benetton (Italy)	34–19	(Ireland) Ulster
Try: Gallagher, 11'c Mendy, 38'c Spagnolo, 64'c Izekor, 79'c Con: Albornoz (4); Pen: Albornoz (2) 25', 57	Report	Try: Doak, 3'c Lowry, 16'c Stockdale, 29'; Con: Doak (2)

Stadio Monigo, Treviso
Attendance: 4,474

=== Round 12 ===
1 March 2025
19:35

(1 BP) Connacht (Ireland)	38-30	(Italy) Benetton
Try: Treacy, 5'c Bolton, 12' 66'; Boyle, 38'c Hurley-Langton, 47'c Devine, 72'c Con: Ioane (3); Hanrahan	Report	Try: Mendy, 19'c Uren, 25'c Zaron 30'c Con: Albornoz (3); Pen: Albornoz, 16', 34', 59'

The Sportsground, Galway
Attendance: 4,217

=== Round 13 ===
22 March 2025	Benetton (Italy)	21-18	(Scotland) Edinburgh (1 BP)	Stadio Monigo, Treviso
16:00	Try: Mendy, 32'; Odogwu, 62'; Pen: Umaga, 6', 36'	Report	Try: McCann, 17'cc Ashman, 48'; Con: Thompson; Pen: Thompson, 29', 43'	Attendance: 4,985

=== Round 14 ===
29 March 2025	Benetton (Italy)	20 - 19	(Wales) Cardiff (1 BP)	Stadio Monigo, Treviso
20:35	Try: Albornoz, 20'; Con: Albornoz, 21'; Pen: Albornoz, 9', 77'	Report:ESPN	Try: Botham, 6'; Bevan, 16'; Lloyd, 68'; Con: Sheedy, 7', 17'	Attendance: 4,715

=== Round 15 ===
19 April 2025	(1 BP) Lions (South Africa)	31 - 42	(Italy) Benetton (1 BP)	Ellis Park Stadium, Johannesburg
13:45	Try: Venter, 27'; Louw, 41'; E. v.d. Merwe, 61'; Prestorius, 77'; Con: Wolhuter, 28', 42', 62', 77'; Pen: Wolhuter, 6'	Report	Try: Umaga, 7'; Mendy, 13', 38'; Marin, 23'; Ruzza, 44'; Con: Umaga, 8', 24', 39', 44'; Pen: Umaga, 18', 35', 65'	Attendance: 3,740; Referee: Craig Evans

=== Round 16 ===
26 April 2025	(1 BP) Stormers (South Africa)	54 – 5	(Italy) Benetton	Cape Town Stadium
18:15	Try: Sandi, 4' du Plessis, 16'; Senatla, 33'; Theuinssen, 43'; Zas, 65' de Villiers, 70'; Feinberg-Mngomezulu, 79'; Con: Feinberg-Mngomezulu, 4', 17', 34', 44', 66', 80'; Pen: Feinberg-Mngomezulu, 10', 20'; Drop: Feinberg-Mngomezulu, 14'	Report, [ 2]	Try: Umaga, 41'	Attendance: 18,474; Referee: Adam Jones

=== Round 17 ===
10 May 2025	(1 BP) Benetton (Italy)	33–7	(Scotland) Glasgow Warriors	Stadio Monigo, Treviso
18:15	Try: Odogwu, 6'; Maile, 8'; Smith, 26'; Menoncello, 52'; Umaga, 57'; Con: Umaga, 6', 9', 53', 58'	Report	Try: Jones, 64'; Con: Horne, 65'	Attendance: 5,000

=== Round 18 ===
16 May 2025	(1 BP) Munster (Ireland)	30–21	(Italy) Benetton	Musgrave Park, Cork
20:00	Try: Crowley, 14'; Barron, 44'; Abrahams, 49'; Wycherley, 73'; Con: Crowley, 15'; Casey, 50'; Pen: Crowley, 21'; Casey, 57'		Try: Rhyno Smith, 19', 28'; Bautista Bernasconi, 69'; Con: Jacob Umaga, 20', 29', 70'	Attendance: 8,800

Benetton Rugby have been eliminated from the Championship.

== European Champions Cup ==
European Rugby Champions Cup Pool 2
Pos	Team	Pld	W	D	L	PF	PA	PD	TF	TA	TB	LB	Pts	Qualification
1	(Ireland) Leinster (2)	4	4	0	0	113	54	+59	15	7	2	0	18	Home Champions Cup round of 16
2	(France) La Rochelle (8)	4	2	0	2	98	75	+23	12	6	1	2	11	Home Champions Cup round of 16
3	(Italy) Benetton (11)	4	2	0	2	83	109	−26	11	14	2	1	11	Away Champions Cup round of 16
4	(France) Clermont (14)	4	2	0	2	89	81	+8	13	12	2	0	10	Away Champions Cup round of 16
5	(England) Bath (10CC)	4	1	0	3	102	114	−12	14	16	1	2	7	Away Challenge Cup round of 16
6	(England) Bristol Bears	4	1	0	3	80	132	−52	12	20	2	1	7	

Source: EPCR
Rules for classification: Tiebreakers for teams tied on points: 1) Number of matches won; 2) Difference between points for and against; 3) Total number of points for; 4) Aggregate number of points scored in matches between tied teams; 5) Number of matches won excluding the first match, then the second and so on until the tie is settled.

Pool matches

=== Round 1 ===
7 December 2024
13:00

(1 BP) Clermont (France)	28–0	(Italy) Benetton
Try: Yato (2) 8' c, 74' c Massa (2) 32' c, 39' c Con: Urdapilleta (4/4) 9', 33', 40', 75'	Report

Stade Marcel-Michelin, Clermont
Attendance: 14,641
Referee: Christophe Ridley (England)

=== Round 2 ===
15 December 2024
13:00

(1 BP) Benetton (Italy)	22–21	(England) Bath (1 BP)
Try: Smith (2) 8' m, 32' c Lynagh 15' m Bernasconi 79' m Con: Albornoz (1/3) 33'	Report	Try: Annett 23' c Bayliss 52' c du Toit 58' c Con: Bailey (3/3) 24', 53', 59'

Stadio Comunale di Monigo, Treviso
Attendance: 4,642
Referee: Sam Grove-White (Scotland)

=== Round 3 ===
12 January 2025
15:15

(1 BP) Bristol Bears (England)	35–29	(Italy) Benetton (2 BP)
Try: Williams 7' c Marmion (2) 17' c, 58' c Lahiff 43' c Thacker 51' c Con: Byrne (5/5) 8', 18', 44', 52', 58'	Report	Try: Smith 13' m Zuliani 22' c Gallagher 39' m Bernasconi 63' c Menoncello 68' m Con: Albornoz (2/5) 23', 64'

Ashton Gate, Bristol
Attendance: 13,104
Referee: Luc Ramos (France)

=== Round 4 ===
18 January 2025
17:30

Benetton (Italy)	32–25	(France) La Rochelle (1 BP)
Try: N. Cannone 14' c Bernasconi 66' c Con: Albornoz (1/1) 14'; Smith (1/1) 67'; Pen: Albornoz (2/3) 22', 41'; Smith (4/5) 39', 49', 59', 62'	Report	Try: Nowell 24' m Kerr-Barlow (2) 44' c, 55' c Con: Hastoy (2/3) 45', 55'; Pen: Hastoy (2/2) 7', 12'

Stadio Comunale di Monigo, Treviso
Attendance: 4,813
Referee: Matthew Carley (England)

Knockout stages

Round of 16
1	(France) Bordeaux Bègles	43
16	(Ireland) Ulster	31
8	(France) La Rochelle	24
9	(Ireland) Munster	25
4	(France) Toulon	72
13	(England) Saracens	42
5	(France) Toulouse	38
12	(England) Sale Sharks	15
2	(Ireland) Leinster	62
15	(England) Harlequins	0
7	(Scotland) Glasgow Warriors	43
10	(England) Leicester Tigers	19
3	(England) Northampton Saints	46
14	(France) Clermont	24
6	(France) Castres	39
11	(Italy) Benetton	37

Quarter-finals
1	(France) Bordeaux Bègles	47
9	(Ireland) Munster	29
4	(France) Toulon	18
5	(France) Toulouse	21
2	(Ireland) Leinster	52
7	(Scotland) Glasgow Warriors	0
3	(England) Northampton Saints	51
6	(France) Castres	16

Semi-finals
1	(France) Bordeaux Bègles	35
5	(France) Toulouse	18
2	(Ireland) Leinster	34
3	(England) Northampton Saints	37

Final
1	(France) Bordeaux Bègles	28
3	(England) Northampton Saints	20

=== Round of 16 ===
Benetton Treviso ended the pool stages as eleventh seed. In the Round of 16, they drew Castres.

5 April 2025
16:00

Castres (France) (6)	39–37	(11) (Italy) Benetton
Try: Baget (2) 2' c, 22' m Chabouni 16' c Babillot 39' m Ambadiang 64' m Fernandez 78' c Con: Le Brun (2/4) 3', 17'; Fernandez (1/2) 79'; Pen: Le Brun (1/2) 47'	Report	Try: Gallo 4' c Mendy 32' m Brex 35' c Bernasconi 43' m Odogwu 57' c Con: Albornoz (3/4) 5', 36', 58'; Pen: Albornoz (1/2) 7', 62'

Stade Pierre-Fabre, Castres
Attendance: 12,258
Referee: Karl Dickson (England)

Benetton Treviso are eliminated from the competition.

== Home attendance ==
End of season.

Domestic League						European Rugby Champions Cup						Total	
League	Fixtures	Total Attendance	Average Attendance	Highest	Lowest	League	Fixtures	Total Attendance	Average Attendance	Highest	Lowest	Total Attendance	Average attendance
2024–25 United Rugby Championship	9	40,020	4,447	5,000	3,243	2024–25 European Champions Cup	2	9,455	4,727	4,813	4,642	49,475	4,498
