= Destiny Aminu =

Italian rugby union player

Destiny Aminu Ugiagbe
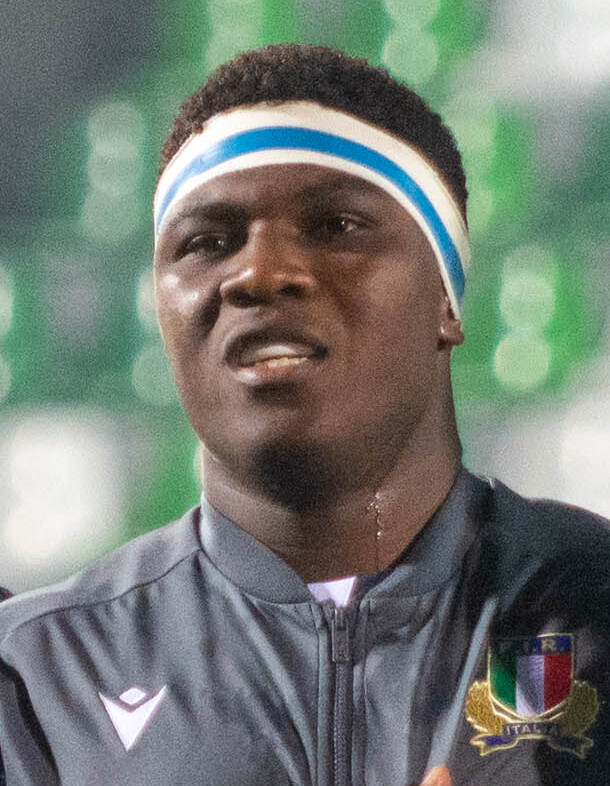
- Aminu in 2023
- Born: 19 October 2003 (age 23) Benin City, Nigeria
- Height: 185 cm (6 ft 1 in)
- Weight: 120 kg (265 lb; 18 st 13 lb)

Rugby union career
- Position: Prop
- Current team: Benetton Rugby
Youth career
- Leonorso Udine
- –: Rugby Udine FVG
- –: F.I.R. Academy
Senior career
Years	Team	Apps	(Points)
2022–2025	Mogliano	27	(15)
2023–2025	→Benetton	8	(0)
2025–	Benetton	12	
- Correct as of 10 Dec 2022
International career
Years	Team	Apps	(Points)
2023	Italy U20	6	(15)
2026	Italy XV	2	(0)

Destiny Aminu Ugiagbe (born 19 October 2003) is a Nigerian-born Italian professional rugby union player who plays prop for Benetton Rugby in the United Rugby Championship.

== Professional career ==
Under contract with Serie A Elite team Mogliano, Aminu was named as Permit Player for Benetton in May 2024 ahead of the 2023–24 United Rugby Championship season and also for 2024–25 United Rugby Championship. He made his debut in Round 16 of the 2023–24 season against the Sharks.

In 2023 he was named in Italy U20s squad for annual Six Nations Under 20s Championship. On 30 November 2023 he was called in Italy Under 23 squad for test series against IRFU Combined Academies. On 28 January 2026 he was selected by Massimo Brunello to be part of an Italy XV squad for two official tests against Scotland A and Chile during 2026 men's rugby union internationals window of spring.
