= Marco Zanon =

Italy international rugby union player

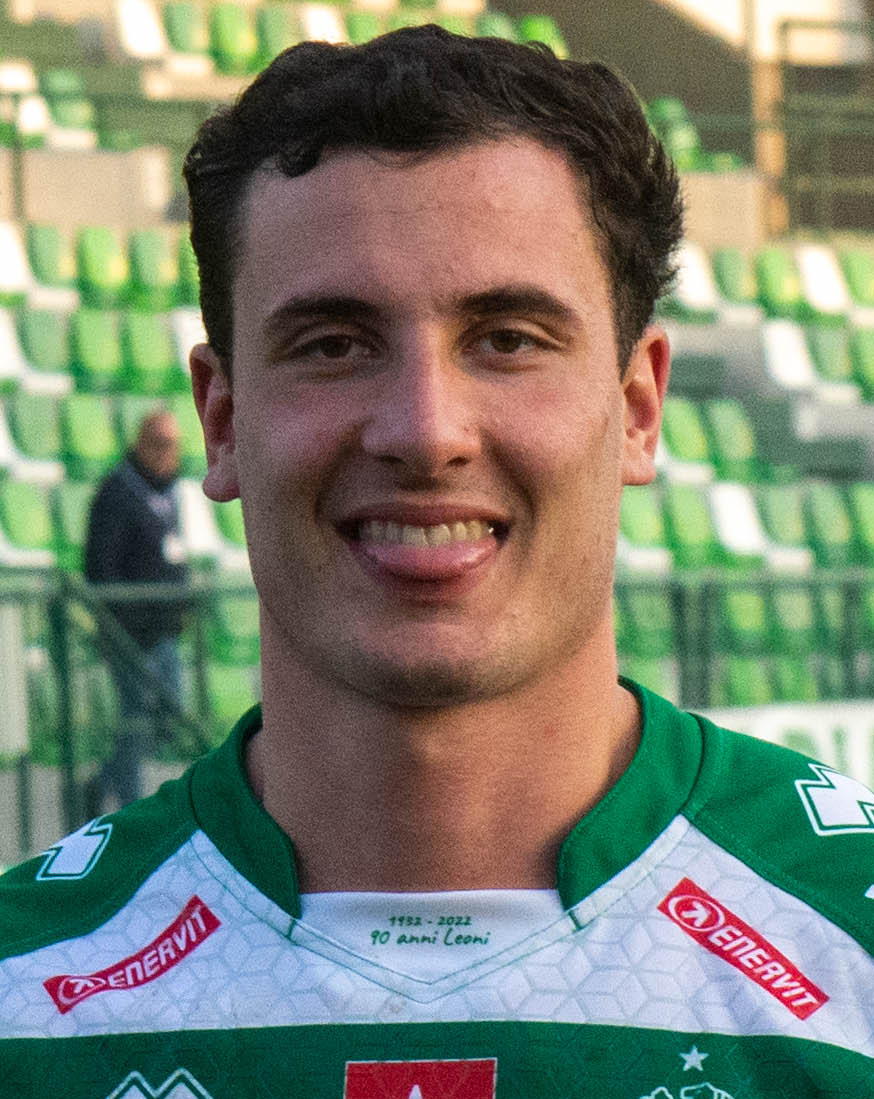
- Zanon during the URC 22-23 Benetton Rugby vs Zebre Parma match
- Born: Marco Zanon; 3 October 1997 (age 29) Bassano del Grappa, Veneto, Italy
- Height: 6 ft 1 in (185 cm)
- Weight: 96 kg (15 st 2 lb; 212 lb)

Rugby union career
- Position: Centre
- Current team: Zebre Parma
Senior career
Years	Team	Apps	(Points)
2015−2018	Mogliano	34	(35)
2017−2018	→Benetton	5	(5)
2018−2022	Benetton	41	(10)
2022	Pau	3	(0)
2022−2025	Benetton	41	(40)
2025−	Zebre Parma	18	(10)
- Correct as of 9 Aug 2026
International career
Years	Team	Apps	(Points)
2016−2017	Italy Under-20	17	(15)
2018	Emerging Italy	3	(5)
2026	Italy XV	1	(0)
2019−	Italy	21	(10)
- Correct as of 12 Jul 2025

Marco Zanon (born 3 October 1997 in Bassano del Grappa, Italy) is a professional rugby union player for Zebre Parma in United Rugby Championship. His preferred position is centre.

== Biography ==
In 2017–18 Pro14 season, during his experience with Top10 team Mogliano, he was named as Permit Player for Benetton in Pro 14. From 2018 to 2022 he played for Benetton full time.
From March to June 2022, he played as Joker medical for Section Paloise. After this experience, he went back to play with Benetton. He played with Treviso until 2024–25 season.

In July 2025, he left Benetton after 8 seasons and signed with Zebre Parma. He made his debut in Round 2 of the 2025–26 season against the Lions.

After playing for Italy Under 20 in 2016 and 2017, in 2018 Zanon was named in the Emerging Italy squad for the World Rugby Nations Cup. On 24 January 2019, Zanon was named in Italy's squad for the 2019 Six Nations. On 28 January 2026 he was selected by Massimo Brunello to be part of an Italy XV squad for two official tests against Scotland A and Chile during 2026 men's rugby union internationals window of spring.

== Personal life ==
He is engaged to the triple jumper Ottavia Cestonaro.
