= Giulio Marini =

Italian rugby union player

- Born: 23 January 2002 (age 24) Treviso
- Height: 195 cm (6 ft 5 in)
- Weight: 117 kg (258 lb; 18 st 6 lb)

Rugby union career
- Position(s): Flanker, Lock
- Current team: Benetton Rugby
Youth career
- Benetton
- –: Mogliano
Senior career
Years	Team	Apps	(Points)
2021–2025	Mogliano	35	(20)
2024–2025	→Benetton	5	(0)
2025–	Benetton	13	(0)
- Correct as of 29 Aug 2026
International career
Years	Team	Apps	(Points)
2022	Italy U20	4	(0)
2026	Italy XV	1	(0)
2026–	Italy	2	(0)
- Correct as of 29 Aug 2026

Giulio Marini (born 23 January 2002) is an Italian professional rugby union player who plays flanker for Benetton in the Italian United Rugby Championship.

== Professional career ==
Under contract with Italian Serie A Elite team Mogliano, Marini was named as Permit Player for Benetton in July 2024 ahead of the 2024–25 United Rugby Championship season. He made his debut in Round 2 of the 2024–25 season against the Glasgow Warriors. He played with Mogliano until summer 2025.

In 2022 he was named in Italy U20s squad for annual Six Nations Under 20s Championship. On 28 January 2026 he was selected by Massimo Brunello to be part of an Italy XV squad for two official tests against Scotland A and Chile during 2026 men's rugby union internationals window of spring.

On 11 July 2026, Marini made his international debut for Italy against New Zealand in Wellington during the 2026 Nations Championship.
