= Marcos Gallorini =

Italian rugby union player

- Full name: Marcos Francesco Gallorini
- Born: 11 October 2004 (age 22) Arezzo, Italy
- Height: 190 cm (6 ft 3 in)
- Weight: 133 kg (293 lb; 20 st 13 lb)

Rugby union career
- Position: Prop
- Current team: Benetton
Youth career
- 2017–2020: Vasari Arezzo
- 2020−2022: Capitolina
- 2023−2024: Benetton Academy
Senior career
Years	Team	Apps	(Points)
2020–2023	Capitolina	1	(0)
2023−	Benetton	8	(0)
2023−2025	→Mogliano	17	(5)
2025−	→Zebre Parma	1	(0)
- Correct as of 27 Nov 2025
International career
Years	Team	Apps	(Points)
2023–2024	Italy U20	15	(50)
2026	Italy XV	2	(5)
- Correct as of 25 February 2024

Marcos Gallorini (born 11 October 2004) is an Italian rugby union player, who plays prop for Benetton in United Rugby Championship.

== Club career ==
Marcos Gallorini started his career in his home town with Vasari Rugby Arezzo, before moving to Rome and the Unione Rugby Capitolina in Serie A on the summer 2022.

In March 2023, he joined the Benetton Treviso academy. He made his debut in Round 4 of the 2024–25 season against the Sharks.

From 2023 to 2025 he played, on loan for Mogliano in the Italian Serie A Elite as Permit Player.

He joined Benetton with a pro contract in June 2025.

== International career ==
Marcos Gallorini first impressed with Italy under-18s, being instrumental in results such as a 41-10 trashing of their Irish counterpart.

He started playing with Italy under-20s during the 2023 Six Nations, where he was a standout player. In 2024 he took part in the victory over the French U20 team in Béziers.

On 3 December 2024 he was called in Italy Under 23 squad for test series against Emerging Scotland. On 28 January 2026 he was selected by Massimo Brunello to be part of an Italy XV squad for two official tests against Scotland A and Chile during 2026 men's rugby union internationals window of spring.
