= Giuliano Avaca =

Argentine rugby union player (born 2003)

- Born: 25 February 2003 (age 23) Cordoba, Argentina
- Height: 1.78 m (5 ft 10 in)
- Weight: 89 kg (196 lb)

Rugby union career
- Position: Fly-Half
- Current team: Dogos XV
Youth career
- Tala
Senior career
Years	Team	Apps	(Points)
2021−2022	Tala		
2022−2023	Benetton	1	(0)
2022–2023	→Mogliano	9	(7)
2023–2025	Mogliano	21	(50)
2025	→Benetton	1	(0)
2025–2026	Benetton	3	(0)
2026	Dogos XV		
- Correct as of 22 Jan 2026
International career
Years	Team	Apps	(Points)
2022	Argentina U20		
- Correct as of 17 October 2022

Giuliano Avaca (born 25 February 2003) is an Argentine rugby union player who last played for Dogos XV in Super Rugby Americas.

Signed in August 2022 as Academy Player for Benetton in United Rugby Championship, he made his debut for Benetton in Round 5 of the 2022–23 United Rugby Championship against Edinburgh. After the loan to Serie A Elite team Mogliano in 2022−23, he was confirmed in its roster for next season.

Under contract with Mogliano, Avaca was named as Permit Player for Benetton in July 2024 ahead of the 2024–25 United Rugby Championship season. He played with Mogliano in Serie A Elite until the summer of 2025. In the 2025–26 season, he played for Benetton in United Rugby Championship.

In 2022, Avaca was named in the Argentina Under 20 squad.

On 30 November 2023 he was called in Italy Under 23 squad for test series against IRFU Combined Academies.
