= Dewald Senekal =

South African rugby union coach (born 1981)

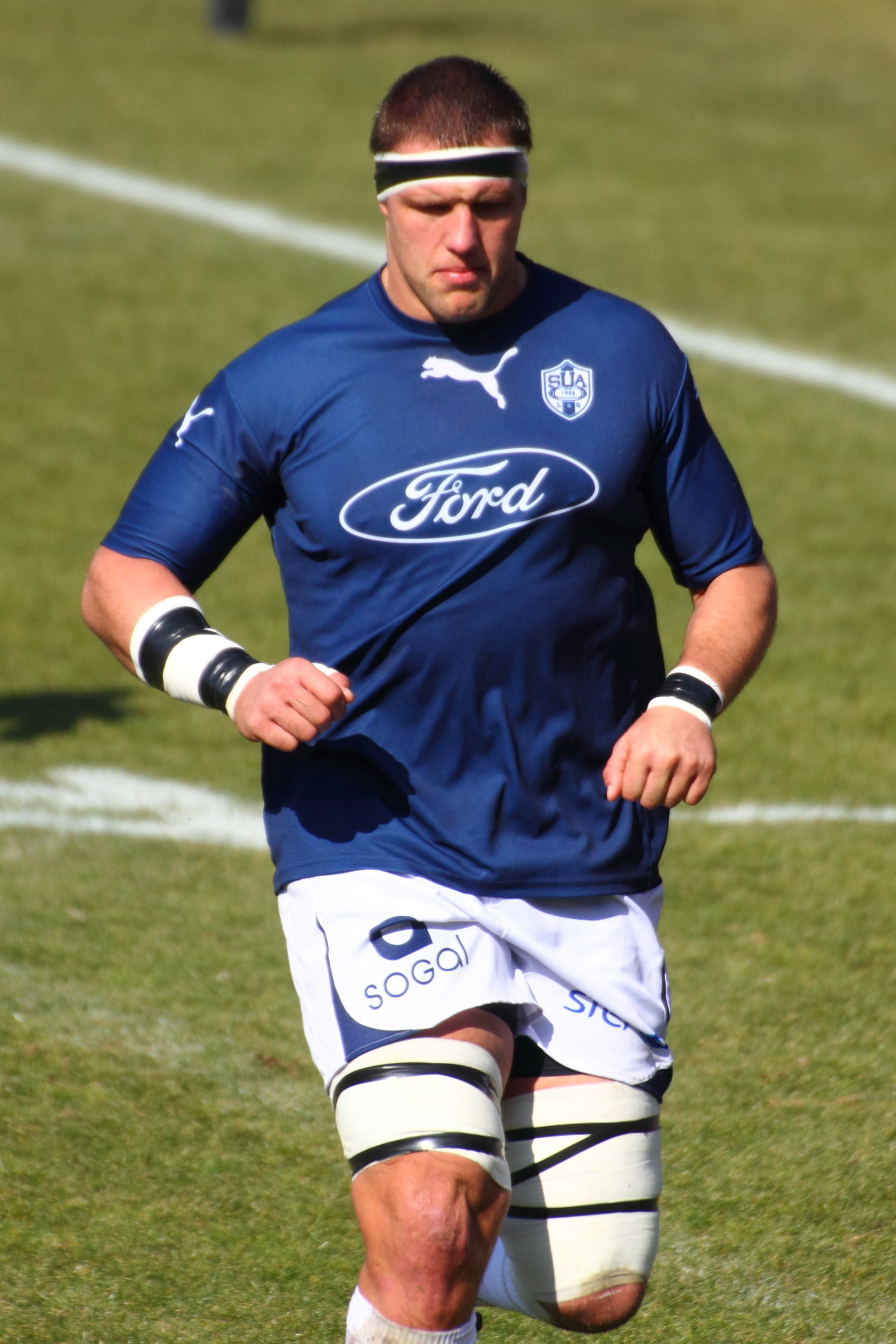
- Born: Dewald Meyer Senekal; 12 January 1981 (age 45) Uitenhage, South Africa
- Height: 1.97 m (6 ft 6 in)
- Weight: 114 kg (251 lb)
- School: HTS Daniel Pienaar, Uitenhage

Rugby union career
- Position(s): Lock; No. 8
- Current team: Connacht
Senior career
Years	Team	Apps	(Points)
2009–2011	Toulon	13	(0)
2011–2012	Agen	37	(5)
2012–2015	Bayonne	76	(5)
- Correct as of 31 May 2015
Provincial / State sides
Years	Team	Apps	(Points)
2005	Pumas	6	(0)
2006–2007	Valke	19	(15)
2008–2009	Golden Lions	11	(5)
Super Rugby
Years	Team	Apps	(Points)
2007–2008	Cheetahs	2	(0)
2008–2009	Lions	7	(0)
Coaching career
- Years: Team
- 2015–2017: Bayonne (Forwards coach)
- 2017–2019: Grenoble (Joint-head coach)
- 2019: Stade Français (Forwards coach)
- 2021–2023: Connacht (Forwards coach)
- 2023–2024: Oyonnax (Assistant coach)
- 2024–: Benetton (Assistant coach)
- Correct as of 30 April 2021

Dewald Meyer Senekal is a South African rugby union coach who is currently Assistant coach of Italian United Rugby Championship team Benetton. From 2021 to 2023 he was Forwards coach for Irish province Connacht.

In his playing career, Senekal played as a number eight for Bayonne, Agen and Toulon in France. He also played for the Cheetahs and Lions in his native South Africa before moving to the Northern hemisphere in 2009.

Senekal has also played cricket for the provincial teams of Eastern Province and the Northerns.
