= Bautista Bernasconi =

Argentine rugby union player

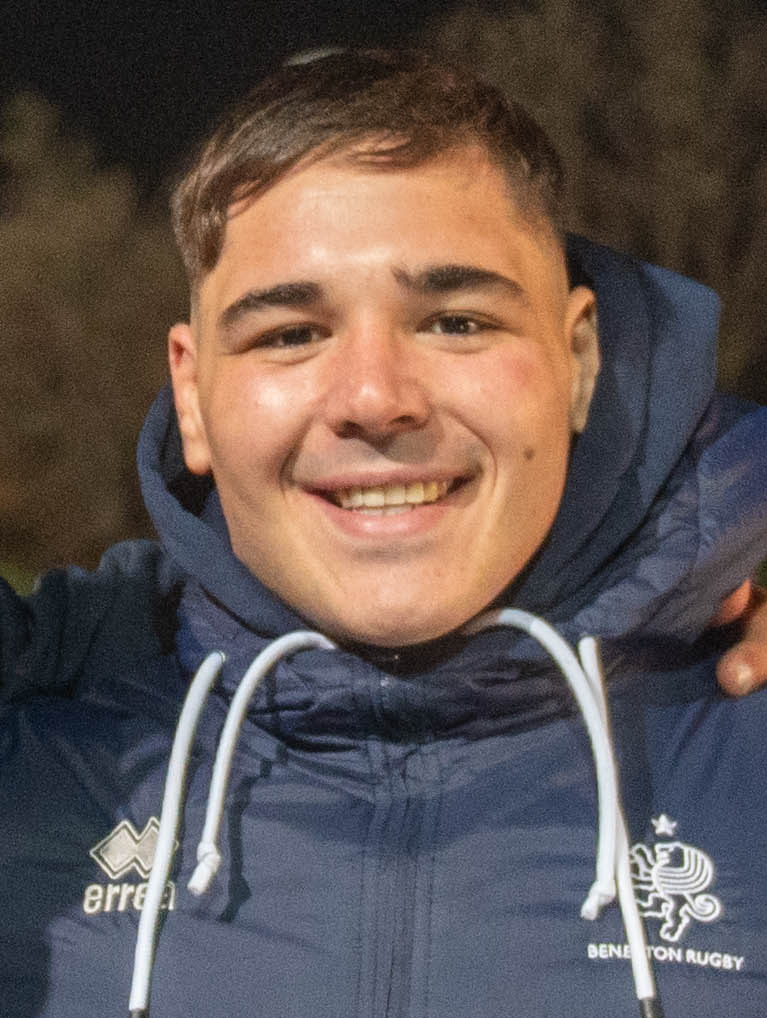
- Bernasconi in 2023
- Born: 14 September 2001 (age 25) Buenos Aires, Argentina
- Height: 174 cm (5 ft 9 in)
- Weight: 113 kg (17.8 st; 249 lb)

Rugby union career
- Position: Hooker
Senior career
Years	Team	Apps	(Points)
2020−2022	CASI	19	(37)
2021–2022	Jaguares XV	17	(35)
2023−	Benetton	59	(0)
- Correct as of 25 Mar 2023
International career
Years	Team	Apps	(Points)
2021	Argentina Under 20		
2021–	Argentina XV	4	(10)
2025–	Argentina	1	(0)
- Correct as of 29 Jan 2023

Bautista Bernasconi (born 14 September 2001) is an Argentine professional rugby union player, currently playing for United Rugby Championship side Benetton. His preferred position is hooker.

== Jaguares XV and CASI ==
In 2021 and 2022 season, he played for Jaguares XV in Superliga Americana de Rugby an for CASI in URBA.

== Benetton ==
Bernasconi signed his contract for Benetton in January 2023 and he made his Benetton debut in Round 13 of the 2022–23 United Rugby Championship against Munster Rugby.

== International career ==
In 2021, Bernasconi was named in the Argentina Under 20 squad. In May 2022, he was named in Argentina XV squad for of the 2022 July international window.

On 5 July 2025, he was named in Argentina squad for 2025 Summer international window.he made his international debut against England in Buenos Aires.
