= Riccardo Genovese =

Italian rugby union player (born 2002)

- Born: 13 April 2002 (age 24) Turin, Italy
- Height: 189 cm (6 ft 2 in)
- Weight: 126 kg (278 lb; 19 st 12 lb)

Rugby union career
- Position: Prop
- Current team: Mogliano/Zebre Parma
Youth career
- Rugby Calvisano
- CUS Torino
- 2020−2022: F.I.R. Academy
Senior career
Years	Team	Apps	(Points)
2022–2024	Zebre Parma	12	(0)
2024–2025	Benetton	3	(0)
2024–2025	→Rangers Vicenza	5	(0)
2025-	Mogliano		
2025–	→Zebre Parma	1	(0)
- Correct as of 10 December 2022
International career
Years	Team	Apps	(Points)
2021–2022	Italy U20	9	(0)

Riccardo Genovese (born 13 April 2002) is an Italian professional rugby union player who plays prop for Mogliano in Serie A Elite.

== Professional career ==
He previously played for clubs such as CUS Torino. Genovese signed for Zebre Parma in May 2022 ahead of the 2022–23 United Rugby Championship as Academy Player. He made his debut in Round 8 of the 2022–23 season against the Ulster.

He played with Zebre Parma until 2023–24 season.

Genovese signed for Benetton Rugby in April 2024 ahead of the 2024–25 United Rugby Championship. He made his debut in Round 1 of United Rugby Championship in the 2024–25 season against the Scarlets. In December 2024 he signed for Rangers Vicenza on loan.

In June 2025 he moved to Mogliano in Serie A Elite.

In 2021 and 2022 Genovese was named in Italy U20s squad for annual Six Nations Under 20s Championship. On 30 November 2023 he was called in Italy Under 23 squad for test series against IRFU Combined Academies.
