= Alessandro Garbisi =

Italy international rugby union player

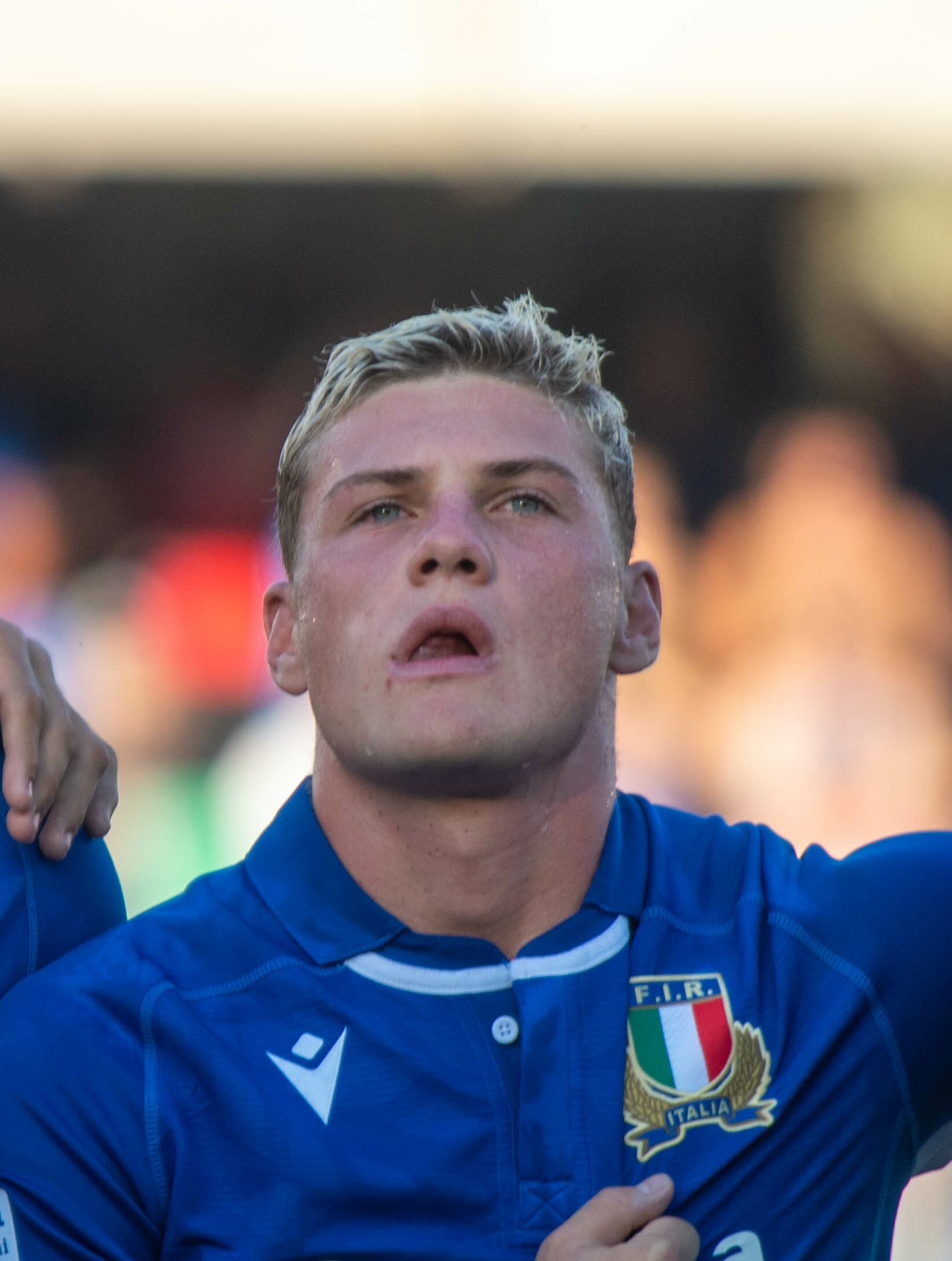
- Garbisi in 2023
- Born: 11 April 2002 (age 24) Venice, Italy
- Height: 174 cm (5 ft 9 in)
- Weight: 83 kg (183 lb; 13 st 1 lb)
- Notable relative: Paolo Garbisi (brother)

Rugby union career
- Position: Scrum-half
- Current team: Benetton
Youth career
- Mogliano
Senior career
Years	Team	Apps	(Points)
2020–2022	Mogliano	19	(8)
2021–2022	→Benetton	9	(0)
2022−	Benetton	80	(27)
- Correct as of 30 Aug 2026
International career
Years	Team	Apps	(Points)
2021–2022	Italy U20	9	(13)
2022–	Italy	26	(25)
- Correct as of 30 Aug 2026
National sevens team
Years	Team		Comps
2023−	Italy Sevens		1

Alessandro Garbisi (born 11 April 2002) is an Italian professional rugby union player who primarily plays scrum-half for Benetton of the United Rugby Championship.

== Professional career ==
Garbisi has previously played for clubs such as Mogliano in the past. He signed for Benetton in June 2021 ahead of the 2021–22 United Rugby Championship on a dual-contract from Top10 side Mogliano. He made his debut in Round 6 of the 2021–22 season against Glasgow Warriors.

In 2021 and 2022, Garbisi was named in Italy U20s squad for the Six Nations Under 20s Championship.

On 30 May 2022, he was selected by Kieran Crowley to be part of an Italy 33-man squad for the 2022 mid-year rugby union tests and won his first cap on 1 July 2022 in Bucharest also scoring a try during the test match Italy won 45–13 against Romania. In occasion of the said match, he and his older brother Paolo are the first couple of brothers since 2014 to appear in the same game sheet of the Italian national team after Mauro and Mirco Bergamasco.

On 22 August 2023, he was named in the Italy's 33-man squad for the 2023 Rugby World Cup.

In June 2023, he was also named in Italy Sevens squad for the 2023 European Games.
