= Dewi Passarella =

Italian rugby union player

- Born: 30 August 2003 (age 23) Mirano, Italy
- Height: 1.90 m (6 ft 3 in)
- Weight: 102 kg (16.1 st; 225 lb)

Rugby union career
- Position: Centre
Youth career
- -: Rugby Riviera
- 2017–2021: F.I.R. Academy
Senior career
Years	Team	Apps	(Points)
2021–2022	Ruggers Tarvisium		
2022−2023	Benetton Rugby	1	(0)
2023−2025	Mogliano		
2025−	Petrarca Padova		
- Correct as of 15 Oct 2022
International career
Years	Team	Apps	(Points)
2022−2023	Italy U20	19	(30)
- Correct as of 19 Mar 2023
National sevens team
Years	Team		Comps
2023–	Italy Sevens		6
- Correct as of 23 Apr 23

Dewi Passarella (born 30 August 2003) is an Italian rugby union player, who plays for Petrarca Padova in Italian Serie A Elite. His preferred position is centre.

== Club career ==
Signed in August 2022 as Academy Player, he made his debut for Benetton in Round 5 of the 2022–23 United Rugby Championship against Edinburgh. In August 2023 signed for Mogliano in Serie A Elite and he played with this team until summer 2025.

== International career ==
In 2022 and 2023, Passarella was named in Italy U20s squad for annual Six Nations Under 20s Championship. On 13 January 2024 he was called in Italy Under 23 squad for test series against IRFU Combined Academies.

In April 2023 he was named in Italy Sevens squad for the 2023 World Rugby Sevens Challenger Series.
