= Matt Gallagher (rugby union) =

Italy international rugby union player (born 1996)

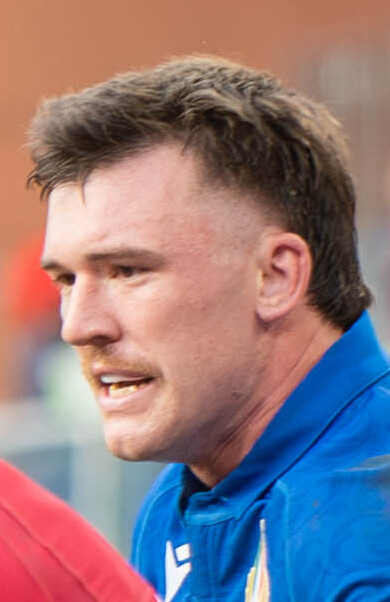
- Gallagher at the Autumn Nations Series '24
- Born: Matthew Abramo Gallagher; 26 October 1996 (age 30) Sidcup, England
- Height: 1.85 m (6 ft 1 in)
- Weight: 96 kg (15.1 st; 212 lb)
- School: Colfe's School
- Notable relative: John Gallagher (father)

Rugby union career
- Position(s): Fullback, Wing
- Current team: Benetton
Senior career
Years	Team	Apps	(Points)
2014–2020	Saracens	44	(45)
2015–2016	→ Old Albanians (loan)	16	(84)
2016–2018	→ Bedford Blues (loan)	10	(15)
2020–2022	Munster	13	(15)
2022–2024	Bath	44	(50)
2024–	Benetton	25	(15)
- Correct as of 30 Aug 2026
International career
Years	Team	Apps	(Points)
2016	England U20	4	(0)
2024–	Italy	3	(0)
- Correct as of 30 Aug 2026

Matthew Abramo Gallagher (born 26 October 1996) is a professional rugby union player for Benetton Rugby in the United Rugby Championship. His primary position is fullback, though can also play on either wing. Gallagher's father is John Gallagher, who won the 1987 Rugby World Cup with New Zealand.

== Professional career ==
Gallagher made his senior competitive debut for Saracens in the Anglo-Welsh Cup against Welsh side Ospreys in November 2014. He was voted the Saracens Academy Player of the Year following strong performances for Saracens Storm during the 2015–16 Premiership Rugby A-League, as well as helping loan club Old Albanian secure promotion to National League 1 after winning the 2015–16 National League 2 South play-offs. He joined Bedford Blues as a dual-registered player ahead of the 2016–17 RFU Championship season, though he was soon called into action for Saracens.

Gallagher joined Irish United Rugby Championship side Munster on a two-year contract from the 2020–21 season, and made his competitive debut for the province in their 2020–21 Pro14 round two fixture against Scottish side Edinburgh on 10 October 2020, which Munster won 25–23. Gallagher scored his first tries for Munster in their 28–16 win against Dragons on 1 November 2020.

Gallagher returned to England to join Premiership Rugby club Bath, where Munster head coach Johann van Graan and defence coach JP Ferreira also joined, ahead of the 2022–23 season. His last appearance for Bath saw him start in the 2024 Premiership final which they lost against Northampton Saints to finish runners up.

Gallagher signed with Italian United Rugby Championship club Benetton a three-year contract from the 2024–25 season. He made his debut in Round 2 of the 2024–25 season against the Glasgow Warriors.

== International career ==
Gallagher is eligible for Italy due to a maternal grandparent. Through his father, former New Zealand international John, Gallagher is qualified to play for Ireland, as his paternal grandfather and grandmother are from Derry and Limerick respectively, but not New Zealand, for whom John qualified through residency. He is also eligible for England, having been born there.

Gallagher represented the nation of his birth at youth level. He was selected for England under-20 at the 2016 World Rugby Under 20 Championship and started in the 45–21 win against Ireland in the final as England lifted the trophy.

Gallagher was included in the Italy squad for their 2024 mid-year rugby union tests. On 5 July 2024 he made his debut for Italy starting at fullback against Samoa at Apia Park.

== Personal life ==
Born in England, Gallagher plays internationally for Italy, where he qualifies for through his mother.
