= Filippo Drago (rugby union) =

Italian rugby union player (born 2001)

- Born: 24 December 2001 (age 24) Treviso, Italy
- Height: 1.86 m (6 ft 1 in)
- Weight: 96 kg (15.1 st; 212 lb)

Rugby union career
- Position: Centre
- Current team: Mogliano
Youth career
- F.I.R. Academy
Senior career
Years	Team	Apps	(Points)
2020–2022	Mogliano	20	(20)
2021–2022	→ Benetton Rugby	9	(5)
2022–2025	Benetton Rugby	12	(0)
2024–2025	→Zebre Parma	6	(0)
2025–	Mogliano		
2025–	→ Benetton Rugby		
- Correct as of 27 June 2025
International career
Years	Team	Apps	(Points)
2021	Italy U20	5	(0)
2021−	Italy A	4	(0)
- Correct as of 24 Jun 2022

Filippo Drago (born 24 December 2001) is an Italian rugby union player, currently playing for Italian side Mogliano in Serie A Elite. His preferred position is centre.

Under contract with Top10 team Mogliano, Drago signed for Benetton as a Permit player in June 2021. He made his debut in Round 3 of the 2021–22 EPCR Challenge Cup against the Dragons.

From November 2024 he played for Zebre Parma until the end of the 2024–25 United Rugby Championship season. He made his debut in Round 1 of the 2024–25 EPCR Challenge Cup against Connacht.

In June 2025 his loan to Zebre ended and he signed with Mogliano in Serie A Elite, the top tier Italian domestic league.

In June 2021 Drago was named in Italy Under 20 squad for 2021 Six Nations Under 20s Championship. On 14 October 2021, he was selected by Alessandro Troncon to be part of an Italy A 28-man squad for the 2021 end-of-year rugby union internationals and on 8 December he was named in Emerging Italy 27-man squad also for the 2021 end-of-year rugby union internationals. On 9 December 2023 he was called in Italy Under 23 squad for test series against IRFU Combined Academies.
