= Federico Zanandrea =

Italian rugby union player (born 2005)

- Born: 30 January 2005 (age 21) Treviso
- Height: 1.90 m (6 ft 3 in)
- Weight: 99 kg (15.6 st; 218 lb)

Rugby union career
- Position: Centre
- Current team: Benetton Rugby
Youth career
- -: Benetton Rugby
Senior career
Years	Team	Apps	(Points)
2023–2025	Mogliano	6	(0)
2025	→Benetton Rugby	2	(0)
2025–	Benetton Rugby		
- Correct as of 15 Oct 2022
International career
Years	Team	Apps	(Points)
2024−	Italy U20	8	(0)
- Correct as of 27 Jan 2025
- Correct as of 27 Jan 2025

Federico Zanandrea (born 30 January 2005) is an Italian rugby union player, who plays for Italian United Rugby Championship team Benetton. His preferred position is centre.

== Club career ==
Under contract with Italian Serie A Elite team Mogliano, Zanandrea was named as Permit Player for Benetton in November 2024 ahead of the 2024–25 United Rugby Championship season. He made his debut in Round 10 of the 2024–25 season against the Ospreys. He played with Mogliano until summer 2025.

== International career ==
In 2024 and 2025 he was named in Italy U20s squad for annual Six Nations Under 20s Championship.
