= Alessandro Izekor =

Italy international rugby union player

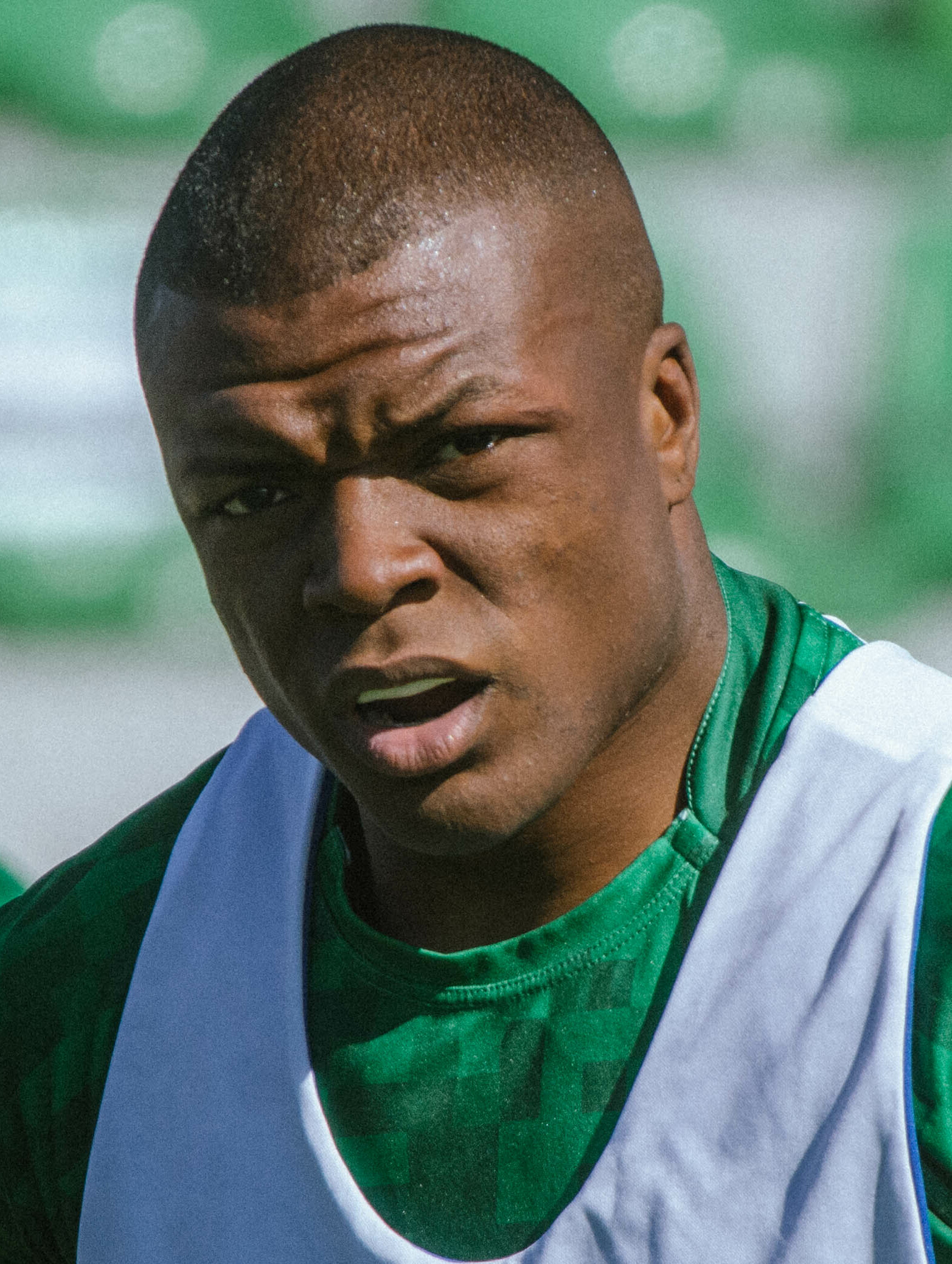
- Izekor in 2023
- Born: 5 March 2000 (age 26) Brescia, Italy
- Height: 1.96 m (6 ft 5 in)
- Weight: 110 kg (17 st 5 lb; 243 lb)

Rugby union career
- Position: Flanker
- Current team: Benetton
Youth career
- -: Brescia
- –: Calvisano
Senior career
Years	Team	Apps	(Points)
2019−2022	Calvisano	46	(95)
2022	→Benetton	3	(0)
2022−	Benetton	68	(65)
- Correct as of 30 Aug 2026
International career
Years	Team	Apps	(Points)
2020	Italy Under 20	1	(0)
2021−2022	Italy A	5	(15)
2024−	Italy	8	(0)
- Correct as of 25 Nov 2025
National sevens team
Years	Team		Comps
2023	Italy Sevens		1
- Correct as of 30 Apr 23

Alessandro Izekor (born 5 March 2000 in Brescia) is an Italian rugby union player. His usual position is flanker and he currently plays for Benetton in United Rugby Championship.

In February 2022, he was named as Permit Player for Benetton Rugby for 2021–22 United Rugby Championship season. He made his debut for Benetton in Round 12 of the 2021–22 United Rugby Championship against Glasgow Warriors.

In 2020, Izekor was named in the Italy Under 20 squad. On 14 October 2021, he was selected by Alessandro Troncon to be part of an Italy A 28-man squad and on 8 December he was named in Emerging Italy 27-man squad for the 2021 end-of-year rugby union internationals.

On 16 January 2024, he was named in Italy squad for 2024 Six Nations Championship. He made his debut against England.

In April 2023, he was named in Italy Sevens squad for the 2023 World Rugby Sevens Challenger Series.
