= Simon Koroiyadi =

English-born Fijian rugby union player

- Born: 13 April 2004 (age 22) Windsor, England
- Height: 191 cm (6 ft 3 in)
- Weight: 111 kg (245 lb; 17 st 7 lb)

Rugby union career
- Position: Flanker
- Current team: Mogliano Rugby/Benetton Rugby
Youth career
- -: Derby RFC
- –: Leicester Tigers
Senior career
| Years | Team | Apps | (Points) |
| 2020–2024 | Leicester Tigers | 4 | (0) |
| 2024– | Mogliano | 6 | (0) |
| 2024– | →Benetton | 5 | (0) |
- Correct as of 30 Nov 2024
International career
| Years | Team | Apps | (Points) |
| 2024 | Fiji Under 20 | 5 | (0) |

Simon Koroiyadi (born 23 April 2004) is an English-born Fijian professional rugby union player who plays Flanker for Mogliano in the Italian Serie A Elite.

== Professional career ==
Until 2024 he played for Academy Leicester Tigers. Under contract with Mogliano, Koroiyadi was named as Permit Player for Benetton in November 2024 ahead of the 2024–25 United Rugby Championship season. He made his debut in Round 7 of the 2024–25 season against the Edinburgh Rugby.

In Summer 2024 he was called in Fiji Under 20 squad for 2024 World Rugby U20 Championship.
