= Louis Lynagh =

Italy international rugby union player

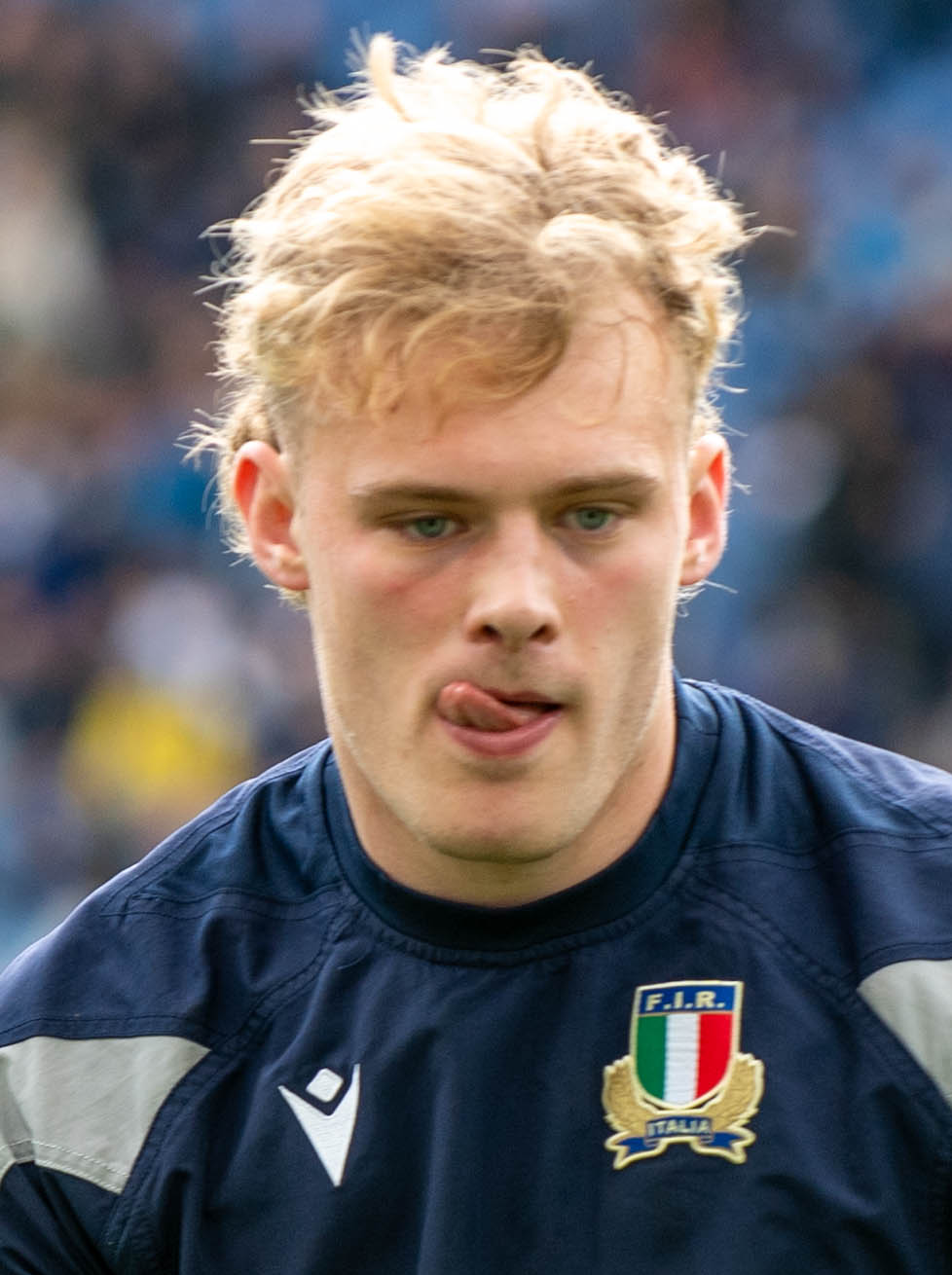
- Lynagh in March 2024
- Born: Louis Lynagh; 3 December 2000 (age 25) Treviso, Italy
- Height: 1.87 m (6 ft 2 in)
- Weight: 95 kg (14 st 13 lb)
- School: Hampton School
- Notable relative(s): Michael Lynagh (father); Tom Lynagh (brother)

Rugby union career
- Position: Wing
- Current team: Benetton
Senior career
Years	Team	Apps	(Points)
2019–2024	Harlequins	67	(155)
2024–	Benetton	21	(55)
- Correct as of 30 Aug 2026
International career
Years	Team	Apps	(Points)
2017	England U16		
2018	England U18	3	(0)
2019	England U19	1	(0)
2024–	Italy	16	(20)
- Correct as of 30 Aug 2026

Louis Lynagh (born 3 December 2000) is a professional rugby union player who plays as a wing for United Rugby Championship club Benetton Rugby. Born in Italy, he qualified to play for England on residency grounds and represented them at age grade levels, before choosing to represent Italy at senior level, making his debut on 9 March 2024.

== Early life ==
Lynagh was born in Treviso, Italy, to an Italian mother and former Australian rugby player Michael Lynagh. At the age of four he moved with his family to England where he began playing mini rugby at Richmond and attended Hampton School.

== Club career ==
=== Harlequins ===
Lynagh joined the academy of Harlequins at the age of thirteen. In October 2020, he made his Premiership debut against Leicester Tigers and later that season scored a try during Harlequins 43–36 defeat of Bristol Bears in the semi-final, a game in which Quins recovered from 28 points down to win. The following weekend, on 26 June 2021, Lynagh scored two late tries as Quins defeated defending champions Exeter Chiefs 40-38 in the final at Twickenham to win their first Premiership title for nine years. In doing so, he equalled the record for the most tries scored by an individual player in a Premiership final and became the youngest ever try scorer in a Premiership final at just 20years 205 days old.

In January 2024, although not originally named in the match day squad, Lynagh started on the bench for Harlequins in their Champions Cup pool stage fixture against Ulster because Cameron Anderson was injured. An HIA replacement for Oscar Beard meant he came off the bench early in the game. Lynagh went on to win man of the match after scoring two tries from Ulster mistakes as they won 47-19. During the same European campaign, he was part of the side that defeated Glasgow Warriors 28-24 at home in the Round of 16, the first time the club had ever won a knockout game in the competition. He started in their semi-final elimination against Toulouse.

=== Benetton ===
Lynagh signed with Italian United Rugby Championship club Benetton a two-year contract from the 2024–25 season, with option until 2027. He made his debut in Round 1 of United Rugby Championship in the 2024–25 season against the Scarlets.

== International career ==
Lynagh represented the England under-16 team and in the summer of 2018 was a member of the England U18 side that toured South Africa. In September 2021 Lynagh received his first call-up to the senior England squad by coach Eddie Jones for a training camp.

Despite previously being called into an England training camp, Lynagh was not capped. In February 2024, he received a call-up to the Italy squad by head coach Gonzalo Quesada for the 2024 Six Nations following the announcement of his move to Benetton at the end of the season. On 9 March 2024, he was named on the wing in the starting side, scoring a try on his debut against Scotland in a game that Italy won 31-29. The following match Lynagh went two wins from two as Italy beat Wales 24-21 at the Millennium Stadium. It was the first time since 2013 that Italy had achieved at least two wins from a Six Nations tournament.

== Career statistics ==
=== List of international tries ===
as of 7 February 2026

No.	Date	Venue	Opponent	Score	Result	Competition	Ref.
1	9 March 2024	Stadio Olimpico, Rome, Italy	Scotland	21–22	31–29	2024 Six Nations Championship	
2	5 July 2024	Apia Park, Apia, Samoa	Samoa	13–7	25–33	2024 mid-year rugby union tests	
3	8 November 2025	Stadio Friuli, Udine, Italy	Australia	17–19	26–19	2025 November Internationals	
4	7 February 2026	Stadio Olimpico, Rome, Italy	Scotland	5-0	18-15	2026 Six Nations Championship	
