= Mirco Spagnolo =

Italy international rugby union player

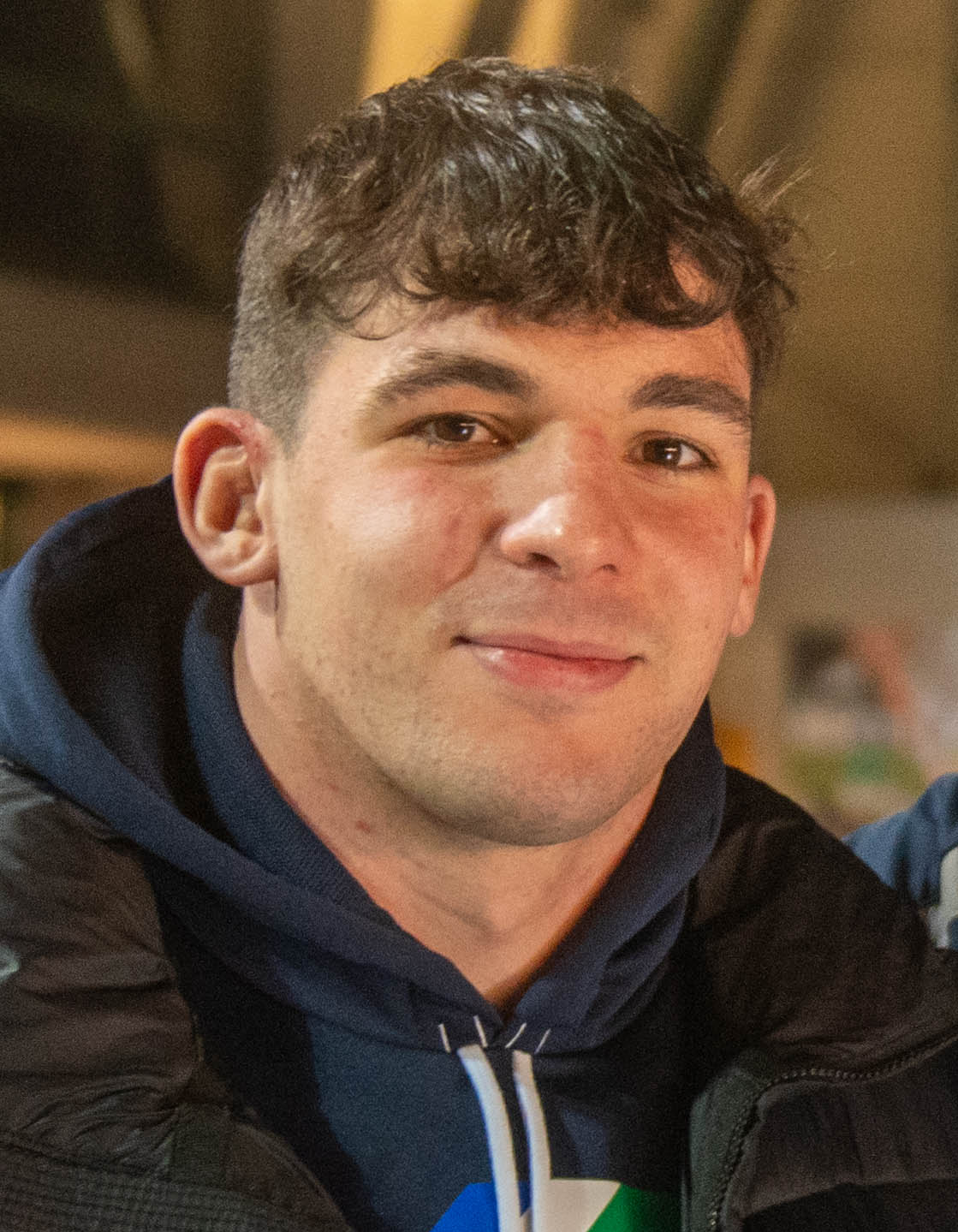
- Spagnolo in 2023
- Born: 2 January 2001 (age 25) Camposampiero, Italy
- Height: 1.86 m (6 ft 1 in)
- Weight: 110 kg (17 st 5 lb; 243 lb)

Rugby union career
- Position: Prop
- Current team: Benetton
Youth career
- Checco l'Ovetto Camposampiero Rugby
- –: Valsugana Rugby Padova
Senior career
| Years | Team | Apps | (Points) |
| 2020−2021 | F.I.R. Academy | | |
| 2021−2023 | Petrarca | 45 | (25) |
| 2023− | Benetton | 45 | (15) |
- Correct as of 29 Aug 2026
International career
| Years | Team | Apps | (Points) |
| 2021 | Italy Under 20 | 5 | (5) |
| 2022 | Italy A | 2 | (0) |
| 2024− | Italy | 26 | (5) |
- Correct as of 29 Aug 2026

Mirco Spagnolo (born 2 January 2001) is a professional Italian rugby union player. His usual position is prop and currently plays for Benetton in the United Rugby Championship.

== Career ==
After two seasons with Petrarca Padova, Spagnolo signed for Benetton Rugby in June 2023 ahead of the 2023–24 United Rugby Championship. He made his debut in Round 1 of the 2023–24 season against the Cardiff.

In 2021, Spagnolo was named in Italy U20s squad for annual Six Nations Under 20s Championship. On 26 May 2022, for the match against Netherlands, he was named in the 30-man Emerging Italy squad for the 2022 July rugby union tests and in Italy A squad for the South African tour in the 2022 mid-year rugby union tests against Namibia and Currie Cup XV team.

On 16 January 2024, he was named in Italy squad for 2024 Six Nations Championship. He made his debut against England.
