= Andy Uren =

English rugby union player

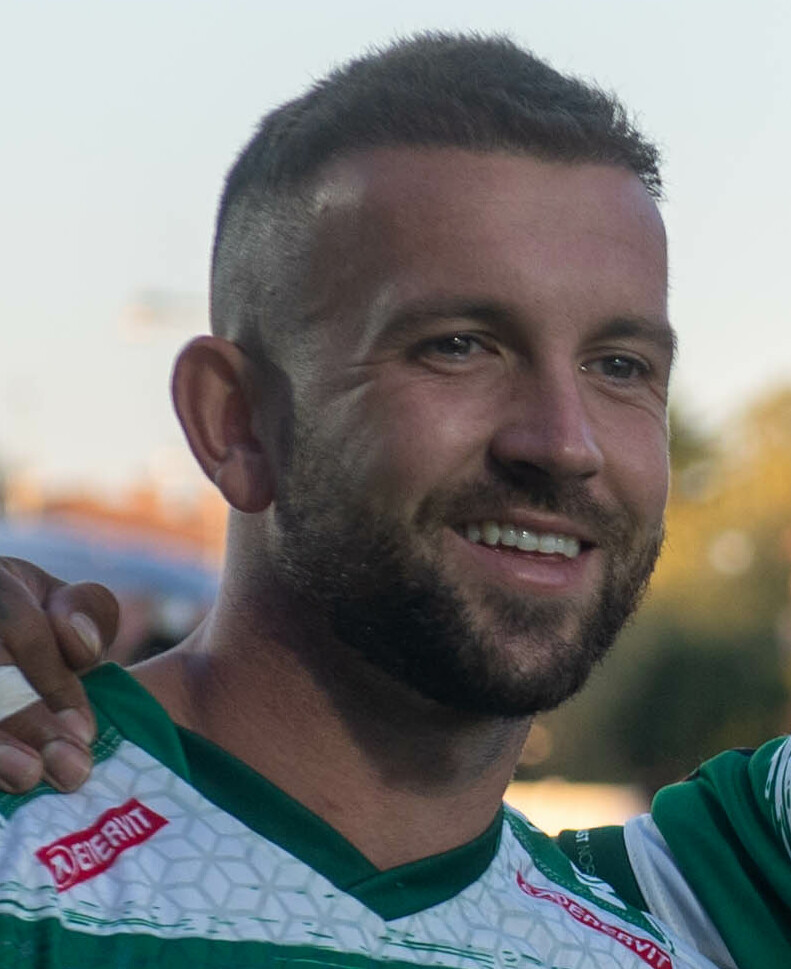
- Uren in 2023
- Born: Andrew William Uren; 20 February 1996 (age 30) Bristol, England
- Height: 1.78 m (5 ft 10 in)
- Weight: 89 kg (14 st 0 lb; 196 lb)

Rugby union career
- Position: Scrum-half
- Current team: Benetton
Senior career
Years	Team	Apps	(Points)
2013–2023	Bristol Bears	152	(95)
2023−	Benetton	62	
- Correct as of 24 November 2020

Andy Uren (born 20 February 1996) is an English professional rugby union player who plays scrum-half for the Benetton Rugby in United Rugby Championship.

From 2013 to 2023, he played for the Bristol Bears also in English Premiership Rugby.

Uren signed with Italian United Rugby Championship club Benetton a three-year contract from the 2023–24 season. He made his debut in Round 1 of the 2023–24 season against the Cardiff.
