= Tomás Albornoz =

Argentine rugby union player (born 1997)

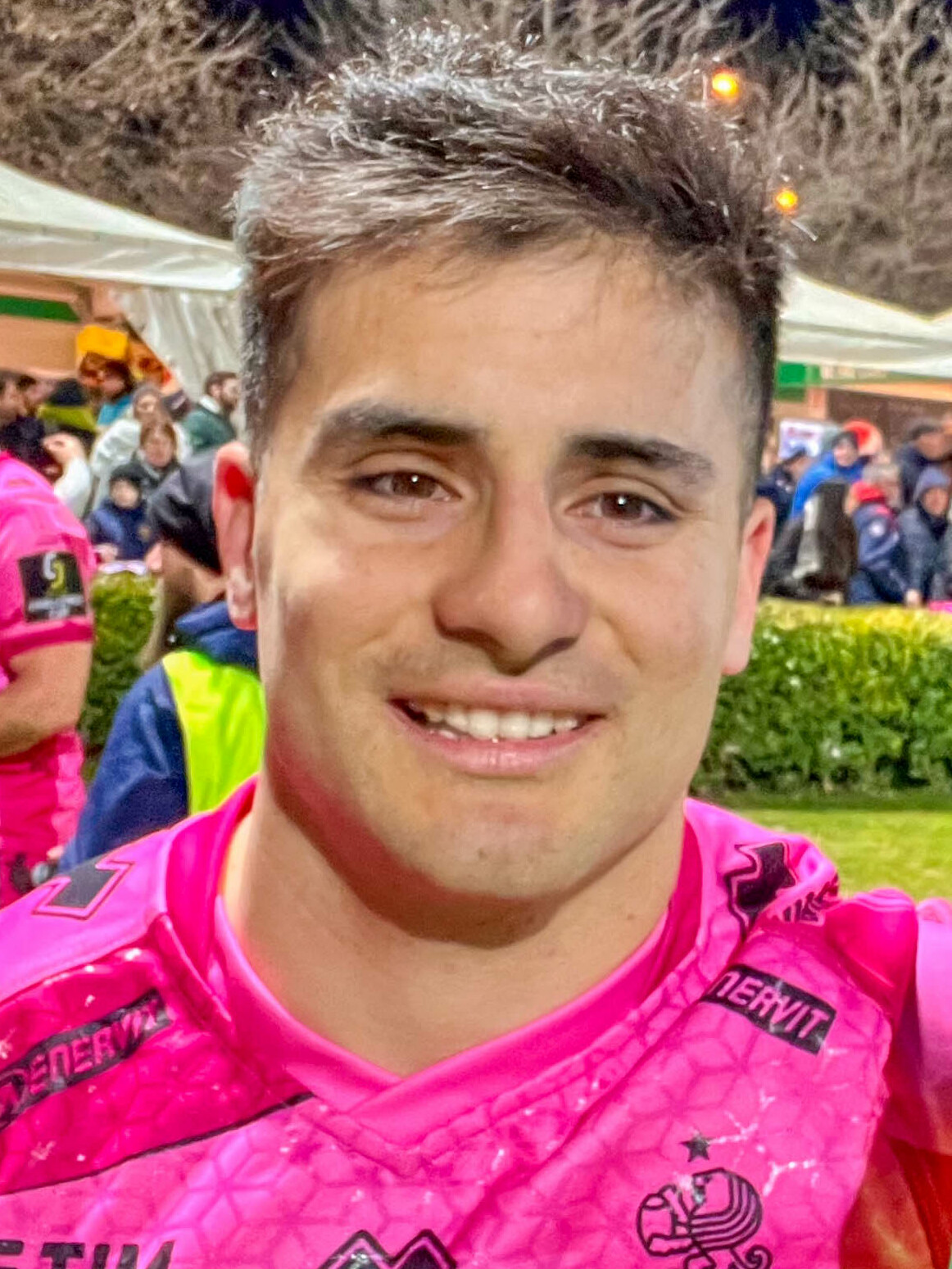
- Albornoz in 2024
- Full name: Tomás Albornoz
- Born: 17 September 1997 (age 29) Argentina
- Height: 5 ft 8 in (1.73 m)
- Weight: 181 lb (82 kg; 12 st 13 lb)

Rugby union career
- Position: Fly-half
Senior career
Years	Team	Apps	(Points)
2016–2019	Tucumán	13	(84)
2020	Ceibos	2	(11)
2021	Jaguares XV	9	(105)
2021−2025	Benetton Rugby	70	(388)
2025−	RC Toulon	0	(0)
- Correct as of 21 Dec 2025
Super Rugby
Years	Team	Apps	(Points)
2020	Jaguares	1	(2)
- Correct as of 16 Feb 2020
International career
Years	Team	Apps	(Points)
2017	Argentina Under 20	5	(49)
2019−	Argentina XV	4	(37)
2022−	Argentina	25	(163)
- Correct as of 21 Dec 2025

Tomás Albornoz (born 17 September 1997) is an Argentine rugby union player who plays for Toulon in Top 14. His playing position is Fly-half.

== Club career ==
On 21 November 2019, he was named in the Jaguares squad for the 2020 Super Rugby season. In 2020 Albornoz he also played for Ceibos and in 2021 joined for Jaguares XV.

In 2022, he moved to Italy to play for Benetton in URC. After 3 and a half season, in December 2025, he left Benetton to sign with Toulon in Top 14.

== International career ==
After playing for Argentina Under 20 in 2017, from 2019 he was named in the Argentina XV. In August 2022, Albornoz was named in Argentina squad for 2022 Rugby Championship. He made his debut in Round 1 of the 2022 Rugby Championship against Australia.
