= Marco Manfredi =

Italy international rugby union player

- Born: 18 September 1997 (age 29) Freiburg, Germany
- Height: 1.83 m (6 ft 0 in)
- Weight: 108 kg (17 st 0 lb; 238 lb)

Rugby union career
- Position: Hooker
- Current team: Valorugby Emilia
Youth career
- -: Jesolo Rugby
- 2014–2015: Benetton
Senior career
Years	Team	Apps	(Points)
2015−2016	San Donà	7	(5)
2016−2018	Montpellier Hérault	-	(-)
2018−2019	Calvisano	19	(10)
2018	→ Zebre	1	(0)
2019−2024	Zebre	49	(15)
2024−2025	Benetton	5	(10)
2025−2026	Northampton Saints	5	(10)
2026−	Valorugby Emilia		
- Correct as of 13 Nov 2026
International career
Years	Team	Apps	(Points)
2016	Italy U20s	9	(10)
2023−	Italy	3	(0)
- Correct as of 6 Oct 2023

Marco Manfredi (Freiburg, 18 September 1997) is an Italian rugby union player. His usual position is hooker and he currently plays for Valorugby Emilia in Serie A Elite in Italy.

From 2016 to 2018, he played with Espoirs team of Montpellier Hérault. Under contract with Top10 team Calvisano, for 2017–18 Pro14 season, he named as Permit Player for Zebre in Pro 14. He played with Italian team Zebre Parma in United Rugby Championship from summer 2019 to 2023–24 season.

Manfredi signed for Benetton Rugby in May 2024 ahead of the 2024–25 United Rugby Championship. He made his debut in Round 1 of United Rugby Championship in the 2024–25 season against the Scarlets. He played with Treviso until October 2025.

In 2016, Manfredi was named in the Italy Under 20 squad. On 29 January 2023, he was selected by Kieran Crowley to be part of an Italy 33-man squad for the 2023 Six Nations Championship. He made his debut against Scotland in the last match.

For injury cover, on 24 September 2023, he was named in Italy's 33-man squad for the 2023 Rugby World Cup.

On 3 October 2025, Manfredi was signed by English club Northampton Saints with immediate effect in the Premiership Rugby from the 2025-26 season. In the summer of 2026, he moved back to Italy to play with Valorugby Emilia.
