= Stadio Comunale di Monigo =

Rugby union stadium in Treviso, Italy

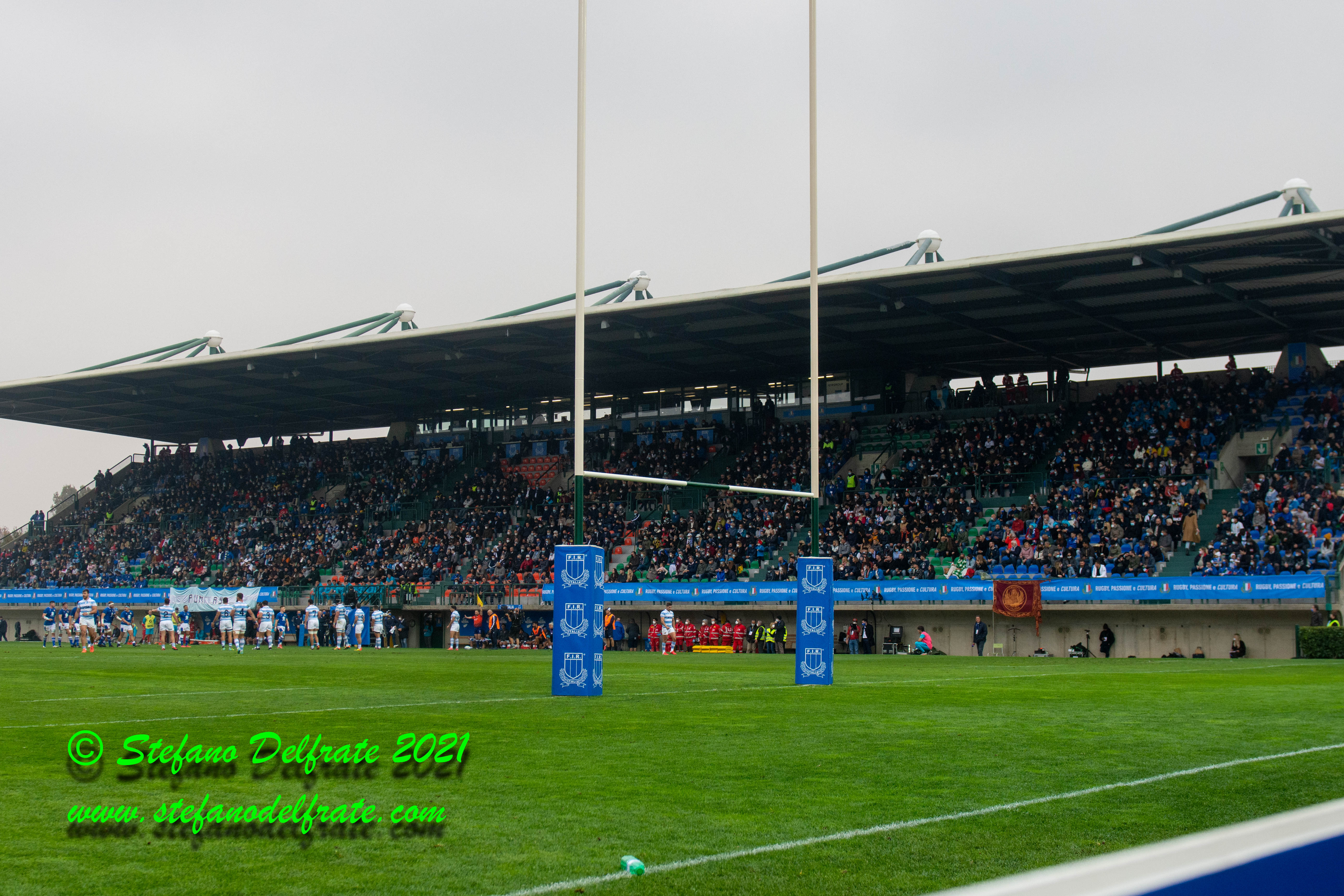
- 13 November 2022, test match between Italy and Argentina
- Interactive map of Stadio Comunale di Monigo
- Coordinates: 45.6803°N 12.2132°E
- Owner: Comune of Treviso
- Capacity: 5,000
- Surface: grass
- Record attendance: 10,000, Italy – Scotland, 24 January 1998
- Public transit: Treviso Centrale railway station Bus route 9

Construction
- Groundbreaking: 1970
- Opened: 1973
- Renovated: 2018

Tenant
- Benetton

Website
- benettonrugby.it/stadio-di-monigo

Stadio Comunale di Monigo is a sports stadium in the Monigo frazione of Treviso, Italy. The stadium is used for rugby union, and is the home ground for Benetton.

The stadium has a total capacity of 5,000, divided between the two covered stands: the Tribuna Ovest (West Stand), seated with 2,700 seats, and the Tribuna Est (East Stand), seated with 2,300 seats. The Tribuna Ovest was the only originally covered stand, in fact the East Stand was renovated in 2018, increasing the capacity and building a cover.

On the occasion of the test match between Italy and Scotland which was played there on 24 January 1998, the capacity was expanded to approximately 10,000 seats thanks to the installation of some temporary stands at the sides of the permanent ones.

The stadium contains six changing rooms for athletes and referees, multiple food&drink outlets, a restaurant, the historical club house, an events room, a press room, a photographers' room, a hospitality suite and the club shop. There are ample parking spaces for a thousand cars adjacent to the stadium and a bus stop is located nearby.

On 19 June 2021, Stadio Comunale di Monigo hosted the Pro14 Rainbow Cup final, where the home side Benetton Rugby faced the winners of the South-African conference, the Bulls. Only 1,250 supporters were allowed in the stadium because of COVID-19 pandemic restrictions.
