= Enrico Ceccato =

Italian rugby union player

- Full name: Enrico Ceccato
- Born: 24 July 1986 (age 40) Treviso, Italy
- Height: 1.79 m (5 ft 10 in)
- Weight: 108 kg (17 st 0 lb; 238 lb)

Rugby union career
- Position(s): Hooker - Treviso, Centre - Mogliano
- Current team: Benetton Treviso
Amateur team(s)
Years	Team	Apps	(Points)
- A.S.D. Rugby Paese
Senior career
Years	Team	Apps	(Points)
2006–2014	Benetton Treviso	60	(5)
2010–2014	Mogliano	61	(45)
- Correct as of 30 June 2013
International career
Years	Team	Apps	(Points)
2005–06	Italy U20	3	(0)
2012	Italy A	3	(0)
- Correct as of 30 June 2013
Coaching career
- Years: Team
- 2015−: Benetton (Team Manager)

Enrico Ceccato (born 24 July 1986) is an Italian rugby union player who plays as a hooker . As of June 2013 he played for Benetton Treviso in the Pro12.

In each of the three seasons to June 2013 Ceccato played for both Treviso and Mogliano, on loan to the other team for a period of time.

At the international level he competed in the youth world championship in 2005 in South Africa.

== Honours ==
- National Championship of Excellence
  - Champions Benetton Treviso: 2006–07, 2008–09, 2009–10
  - Champions Mogliano: 2012–13
- Coppa Italia
  - Champions Benetton Treviso: 2009–10
- Italian Super Cup
  - Champions Benetton Treviso: 2006, 2009
