= Paolo Odogwu =

Italian rugby union player (born 1997)

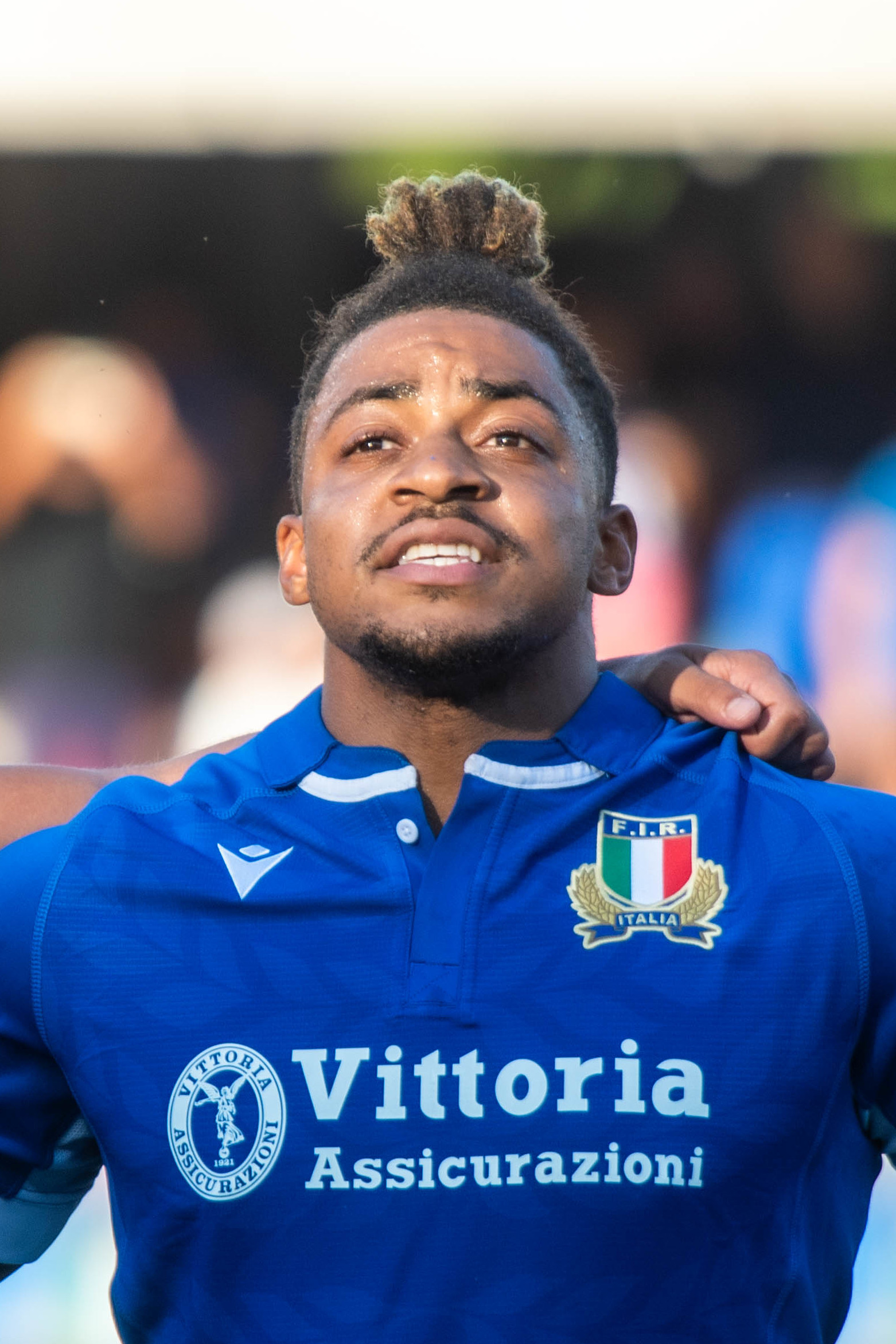
- Odogwu in 2023
- Born: Paolo Chukwudi Odogwu; 18 February 1997 (age 29) Coventry, England
- Height: 1.75 m (5 ft 9 in)
- Weight: 98 kg (216 lb; 15 st 6 lb)
- School: King Edward's School, Birmingham; Leicester Grammar School

Rugby union career
- Position(s): Wing, Outside Centre
- Current team: Benetton Rugby
Youth career
- 2014–2016: Leicester Tigers
Senior career
Years	Team	Apps	(Points)
2016–2019	Sale Sharks	29	(35)
2017	→ Sale FC (loan)	24	(100)
2017	→ Rotherham (loan)	1	(0)
2019–2022	Wasps	42	(80)
2022–2023	Stade Français	12	(5)
2023−	Benetton	37	(70)
- Correct as of 30 Aug 2026
International career
Years	Team	Apps	(Points)
2015	England U18	2	(10)
2016–2017	England U20	5	(0)
2023–	Italy	10	(10)
- Correct as of 30 Aug 2026

Paolo Odogwu (born 18 February 1997) is a professional rugby union player who plays as a winger for Benetton Rugby in the United Rugby Championship.

== Rugby career ==
After playing many positions at age grade level for King Edward's School Birmingham and Walsall RFC including prop, and number 8; Odogwu was deemed "too fast" to be a forward and focused his talent in the centres and on the wing.

Odogwu spent his academy years at Leicester Tigers, scoring a memorable try in Marcos Ayerza's testimonial match at Welford Road, beating three players from the halfway line to score in the corner. He was released by Leicester in the summer of 2016 and signed for Sale Sharks.

=== Sale Sharks ===
Odogwu rose to fame after his performances for Sale in the Aviva Premiership Singha 7s tournament, scoring 8 tries in the group stage, breaking the record of 7 set by Christian Wade the previous year. This earned him the man of the round award.

In September 2016 Odogwu made his senior debut for Sale in the second round of the Premiership season against Harlequins, impressing onlookers with footwork, pace and power. The following month saw him score his first try for the club against former side Leicester in round 5.

Odogwu left Sale at the end of the 2018–19 season after spending 3 seasons at the club and making 29 first team appearances, signing for Coventry-based club Wasps.

=== Wasps ===
Odogwu scored six tries for Wasps at the 2019 Premiership 7s, helping the team reach the final in what was his first outing for the club, becoming the Premiership Rugby 7's All-time top try scorer. Odogwu was banned for 6 weeks in November 2019 after making contact with the head of Sale Sharks player Rohan Janse van Rensburg with his boot whilst fielding a high kick.

He scored his first tries for the club in round 2 of the 2020-21 Premiership season against Gloucester; finding his way over the tryline twice in the last 2 minutes of the game to help Wasps to a try bonus point. After some excellent form in late 2020 and early 2021, Odogwu earned his first man of the match award in a thrilling 44–52 victory away to Bath.

Odogwu was made redundant along with every other Wasps player and coach when the team entered administration on 17 October 2022.

=== Stade Français ===
On 27 October 2022, it was confirmed that Odogwu would spend the 2022–23 Top 14 season with Stade Français. He scored a try on his league debut against Racing 92.

=== Benetton ===
Odogwu joined Benetton Rugby for the 2023–24 United Rugby Championship.

== International career ==
=== England ===
Odogwu represented England under-18. He played for England U20 in the 2016 Six Nations Under 20s Championship. Odogwu was a member of their squad at the 2017 World Rugby Under 20 Championship and came off the bench as a substitute in the final as England were defeated by New Zealand to finish runners up.

In January 2021, Odogwu was included in the England Senior squad by coach Eddie Jones for the 2021 Six Nations. Ultimately, he never made an appearance at senior level for England.

=== Italy ===
Odogwu is eligible to represent Italy through his father. He was named in Italy's training squad for the 2023 Rugby World Cup. On 5 July 2023, he was selected by coach Kieran Crowley to be part of an Italy squad for the 2023 Rugby World Cup warm-up matches. Odogwu made his debut against Ireland in the second match on 5 August 2023. He scored his first try at international level in their penultimate warm-up game against Romania.

On 22 August 2023, Odogwu was named in Italy's 33-man squad for the 2023 Rugby World Cup. He scored a try in their opening game of the tournament against Namibia.

== Career statistics ==
=== List of international tries ===
as of 9 September 2023

No.	Date	Venue	Opponent	Score	Result	Competition	Ref.
1	19 August 2023	Stadio Riviera delle Palme, San Benedetto del Tronto, Italy	Romania	5–0	57–7	2023 Rugby World Cup warm-up matches	
2	9 September 2023	Stade Geoffroy-Guichard, Saint-Étienne, France	Namibia	50–8	52–8	2023 Rugby World Cup	
