= Leonardo Marin =

Italy international rugby union player

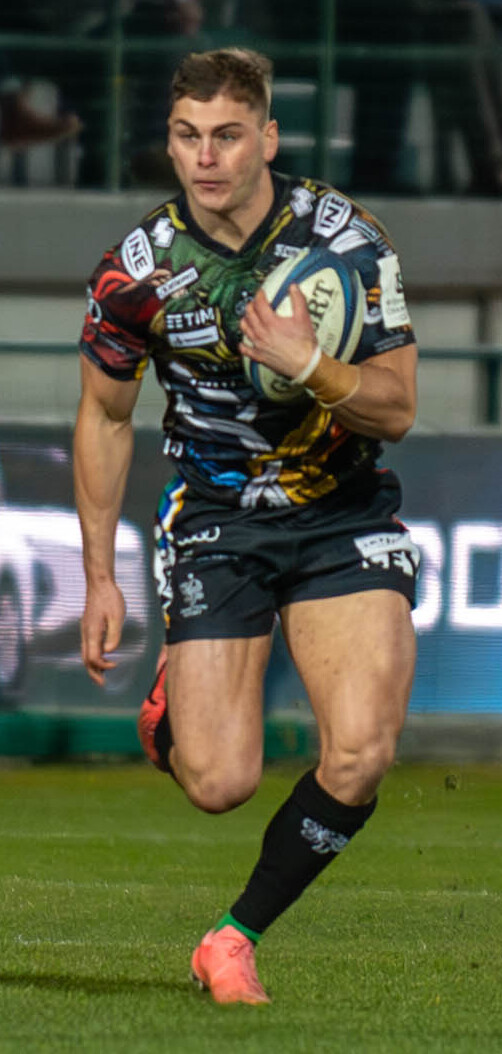
- Marin in 2025
- Full name: Leonardo Marin
- Born: 23 February 2002 (age 24) Mestre, Italy
- Height: 188 cm (6 ft 2 in)
- Weight: 100 kg (220 lb; 15 st 10 lb)

Rugby union career
- Position(s): Fly-half, Centre
- Current team: Benetton
Youth career
- 2008-2018: Mogliano
- 2019-2021: F.I.R. Academy
Senior career
| Years | Team | Apps | (Points) |
| 2018-2019 | Mogliano | 4 | (0) |
| 2021– | Benetton | 56 | (83) |
- Correct as of 30 Aug 2026
International career
| Years | Team | Apps | (Points) |
| 2021 | Italy under-20 | 5 | (23) |
| 2021 | Italy A | 2 | (17) |
| 2022– | Italy | 26 | (22) |
- Correct as of 30 Aug 2026

Leonardo Marin (Italian pronunciation: [maˈrin]; born 23 February 2002) is an Italian professional rugby union player who primarily plays fly-half for Benetton of the United Rugby Championship. He has also represented Italy at international level, having made his test debut against France during the 2022 Six Nations Championship. Marin has previously played for clubs such as Mogliano in the past.

== Professional career ==
Marin signed for Benetton in July 2021 ahead of the 2021–22 United Rugby Championship. He made his debut in Round 1 of the 2021–22 season against the Stormers.

In 2021, Marin was named in Italy U20s squad for annual Six Nations Under 20s Championship. On 14 October 2021, he was selected by Alessandro Troncon to be part of an Italy A 28-man squad for the 2021 end-of-year rugby union internationals.

On 13 January 2022, he was selected by Kieran Crowley to be part of an Italy 33-man squad for the 2022 Six Nations Championship. He made his debut against France.

On 13 January 2024, he was called in Italy Under 23 squad for test series against IRFU Combined Academies.
