= Siua Maile =

Tongan rugby union player

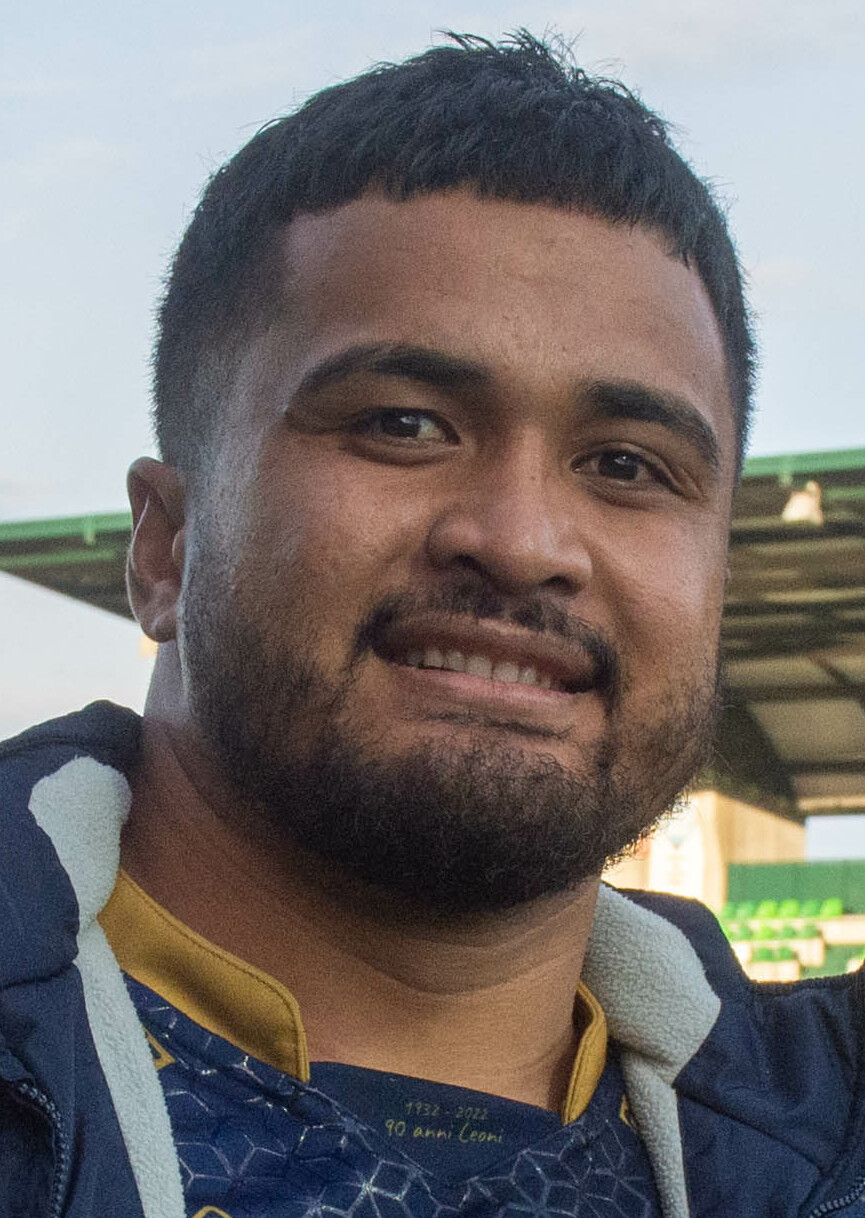
- Maile representing Benetton during the EPCR Challenge Cup
- Full name: Siua Pututau Maile
- Born: 18 February 1997 (age 29) ʻEua, Tonga
- Height: 1.81 m (5 ft 11 in)
- Weight: 111 kg (245 lb; 17 st 7 lb)
- School: Timaru Boys' High School

Rugby union career
- Position: Hooker
- Current team: Benetton
Senior career
Years	Team	Apps	(Points)
2020–2022	Manawatu	22	(30)
2022	Hurricanes	2	(5)
2022−	Benetton	52	(45)
- Correct as of 28 August 2023
International career
Years	Team	Apps	(Points)
2019–	Tonga	19	(5)
- Correct as of 28 August 2023

Siua Pututau Maile (born 18 February 1997) is a Tongan professional rugby union player who plays as a hooker for United Rugby Championship club Benetton and the Tonga national team.

== Early life ==
Siua grew up in Tonga since his birth and moved to New Zealand in 2013 to pursue a rugby scholarship at Timaru Boys' High School and later became a roofer in Christchurch. Siua is married to Mele Vuka Maile and has three son’s VaiTo Maile, Siosiua Maile, Tevita Maile.

== Club career ==
He played for Manawatu from 2020 to 2022 and for Hurricanes in Super Rugby in 2022.

== International career ==
He made his international debut for Tonga against New Zealand in a World Cup warm-up match on 7 September 2019. He represented also Tonga for the 2019 Rugby World Cup which was held in Japan for the first time and also marks his first World Cup appearance. Prior to his World Cup call, he served as a roofer in Christchurch. He made his debut World Cup match appearance in a Pool C match against England on 22 September 2019.
