= Massimo Brunello =

Italy international rugby union player & coach

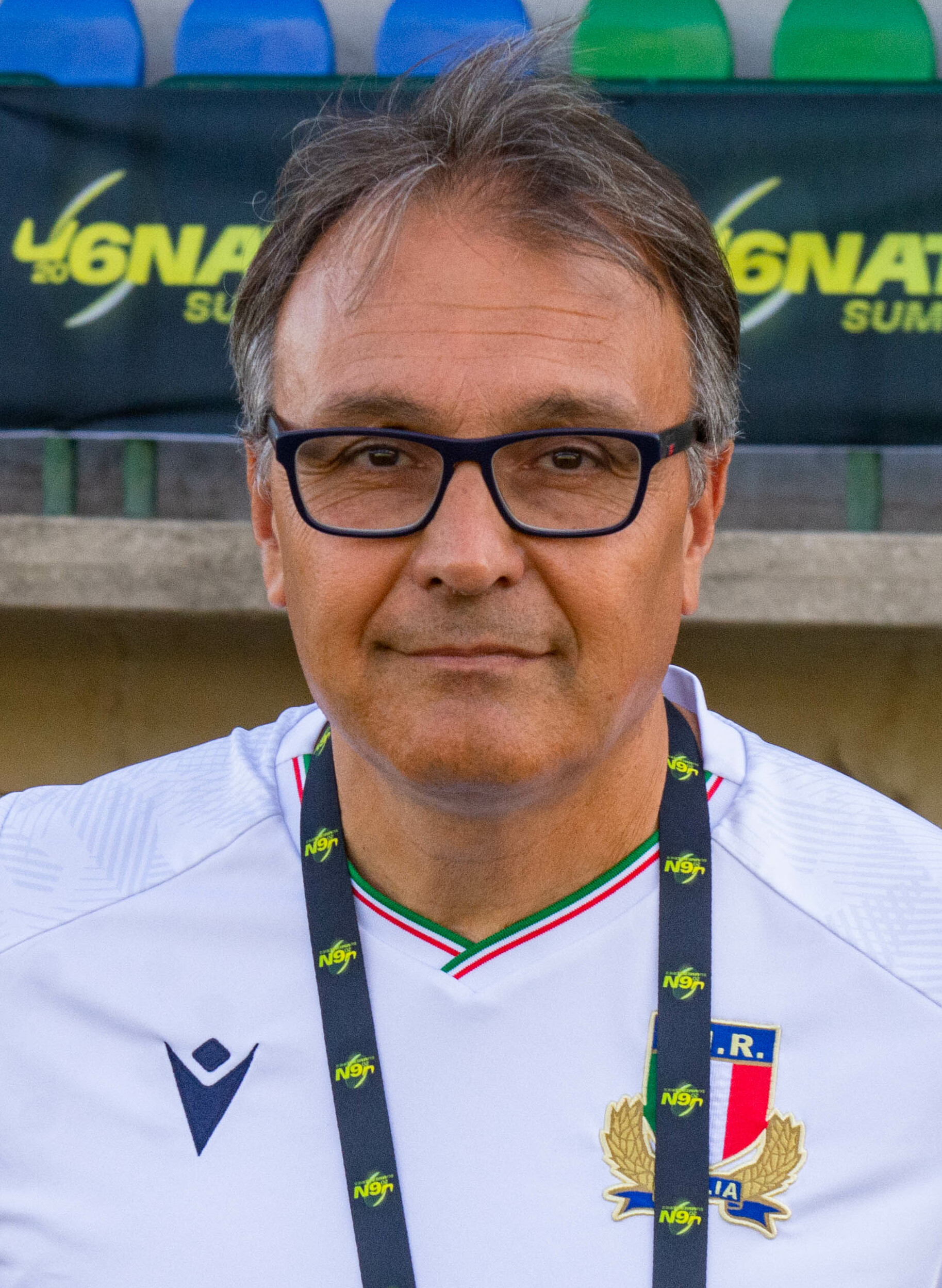
- Born: Massimo Brunello; 18 June 1967 (age 59) Arquà Polesine, Veneto, Italy
- Height: 1.80 m (5 ft 11 in)
- Weight: 81 kg (179 lb; 12.8 st)

Rugby union career
- Position: Utility Back
Senior career
Years	Team	Apps	(Points)
1985–2000	Rovigo	257	(531)
International career
Years	Team	Apps	(Points)
1988–1993	Italy	8	(15)
Coaching career
- Years: Team
- 2002–2003: Rovigo (coach Under 21s)
- 2003–2004: Rovigo (assistant coach)
- 2004–2007: Rugby Badia (head coach)
- 2007–2009: Rovigo (head coach)
- 2009–2015: Italy (coach Under 18s)
- 2015–2020: Calvisano (head coach)
- 2020–2024: Italy Under 20s (head coach)
- 2024–: Zebre (head coach)
- 2026–: Italy XV (head coach)

Massimo Brunello (Arquà Polesine, 18 June 1967) is an Italian former Rugby union player and current rugby union coach. From 2015 to 2020 he has been the head coach of Calvisano. From 2020 to 2024 he has been the head coach of the Italy Under 20s. Since 2024 he is the head coach of Zebre.

== Club career ==
As player, Massimo Brunello spent his entire rugby career with Rovigo, where he won two Scudetto's, in 1987–1988. and 1989–1990.

He had a key role in winning the first of the two: he was the one, during the final played in Rome, to pass the ball to Graziano Ravanelli, after a long solo run at the 79th minute, with which Rovigo scored, overtaking Benetton in the score and winning the match. Even though it was Ravanelli to have scored, this try is often referred to as "Brunello's try".

== International career ==
He debuted for Italy on 31 December 1988 in Dublin against Ireland. Despite the defeat, he scored the only Italian try. Until 1990 he gained seven caps, all in FIRA Cup. He played an eighth and last match, in 1993 against Portugal, two and a half years after the latest cap.

== Coaching career ==
He retired in 2000 after 257 matches in Serie A and 101 tries (with 541 points scored in total). After that, he started his coaching career. At first as part of Rovigo's youth team, then as assistant coach of the senior team and eventually as head coach of Rugby Badia, from 2004 to 2006, where he led the club to the promotion from Serie B to Serie A.

Having come back to Rovigo in 2007 as head coach, he led the team in Challenge Cup in his first year and to the playoffs of Super 10 in the 2008–2009 season, for the first time since 1998. At the end of the season, he was signed by FIR as manager for the youth teams and the FIR Academy in Mogliano. In 2015, leading the U18 national team, he achieved their wins record with 6 consecutive wins and one draw, losing only the last match of the season.

He moved to Calvisano in 2015 and won two league titles in 2016–2017 and 2018–2019. In 2020 he went back to coaching the Under 20s Italian national team.

In the 2021 Six Nations Under 20s his team won only one game but was competitive in each game and conceded the second least points in the championship.

In the 2022 Six Nations Under 20s Italy won 3 matches, its highest number of wins in a single tournament. They also beat England for the first time. At the Summer Series of the same year, a tournament organised in substitution of the World Rugby U20 Championship, which was cancelled because of the COVID-19 pandemic, Italy arrived third in the championship, winning 3 matches and beating again England.

In the 2023 Six Nations Under 20s Italy won 2 matches and reached 15 points in the standing, ranking 3rd, its highest position ever in the championship at that time.

In the 2024 Six Nations Under 20s Italy won again 2 matches, beating France 20–23 away in Béziers

At the end of the tournament, we left the Under 20s national team and became the head coach of Zebre in the URC. In the 2024–25 season Zebre finished in 15th position, with 5 wins and 29 points.

== Honours and awards ==
=== Player ===
Italian Serie A league

- Winner (2):
  - Rovigo: 1987–1988
  - Rovigo: 1989–1990

=== Coach ===
Italian Serie A league

- Winner (2):
  - Calvisano: 2016–2017
  - Calvisano: 2018–2019

United Rugby Championship BKT Coach of the Season 2024–2025

On 6 June 2025 Massimo Brunello was awarded the URC BKT Coach of the Season 2024–25 for making "Zebre even more competitive this season with some impressive wins".
