= List of Lions (United Rugby Championship) players =

This is a list of rugby union footballers who have played for the Lions in Super Rugby, the Pro14 and United Rugby Championship competitions, and the EPCR Challenge Cup. The list includes any player that has played in a regular season match, semi-final or final for the Lions, ordered by debut date and name. The Lions competed in Super Rugby in 1996 as Transvaal, in 1997 as the Gauteng Lions, in 1998 as the Golden Cats, as the Cats between 1999 and 2006 and as the Lions between 2007 and 2012 and from 2014 to 2020, competed in the Pro14 Rainbow Cup in 2021, the United Rugby Championship from 2021, the EPCR Challenge Cup between the 2022/23 season and 2025/26 season and the European Rugby Champions Cup in 2026/27.

== Super Rugby players ==
No.	Name	Caps	Tries	C	P	DG	Points	Debut	Last
1	Japie Barnard	8						01/03/1996	01/05/1996
2	James Dalton	16	3				15	01/03/1996	22/03/2003
3	Pieter Hendriks	12	3				15	01/03/1996	17/05/1997
4	Gavin Johnson	15	4	18	25		131	01/03/1996	03/05/1997
5	Gavin Lawless	10	4	14	21		111	01/03/1996	11/05/1996
6	Johan le Roux	4						01/03/1996	11/05/1996
7	Jacobus Louw	2						01/03/1996	05/03/1996
8	Japie Mulder	45	12	1			62	01/03/1996	11/05/2001
9	Francois Pienaar	11	2				10	01/03/1996	11/05/1996
10	Charles Rossouw	7	1				5	01/03/1996	01/05/1996
11	Johan Roux	15	6	3	6		54	01/03/1996	25/04/1997
12	Christiaan Scholtz	7	1				5	01/03/1996	14/03/1997
13	Rudolf Straeuli	1						01/03/1996	01/03/1996
14	Hannes Strydom	32	2				10	01/03/1996	16/05/1998
15	Kobus Wiese	11	2				10	01/03/1996	28/03/1998
16	Pierre Hoffmann	4						01/03/1996	23/03/1996
17	Chris Rossouw	18	2				10	01/03/1996	17/05/1997
18	Jopie Adlam	6	3				15	05/03/1996	17/05/1997
19	Kevin Luther	1						05/03/1996	05/03/1996
20	Phillip Schutte	9						05/03/1996	11/05/1996
21	Piet van Westing	1						05/03/1996	05/03/1996
22	Ian Hattingh	6	1				5	05/03/1996	11/05/1996
23	Hennie le Roux	25	5	5	2		41	09/03/1996	13/05/2000
24	Lee Stewart	3						09/03/1996	19/04/1996
25	Jannie van der Walt	45	19		1		98	09/03/1996	11/05/2002
26	Stephan Bronkhorst	1						09/03/1996	09/03/1996
27	Connie Campher	2						15/03/1996	23/03/1996
28	Joe Esterhuyzen	7	1				5	15/03/1996	16/05/1998
29	Calla Niemand	1						15/03/1996	15/03/1996
30	Kapstok van Greuning	16						15/03/1996	17/05/1997
31	Louis van Rensburg	6						15/03/1996	17/05/1997
32	Willem Gouws	1						15/03/1996	15/03/1996
33	Ian MacDonald	15	2				10	23/03/1996	17/05/1997
34	Joe Gillingham	13	4				20	13/04/1996	17/05/1997
35	Gerhard Combrinck	5	1				5	19/04/1996	11/05/1996
36	Andre Homan	3						19/04/1996	11/05/1996
37	Warren Brosnihan	8	2				10	02/03/1997	17/05/1997
38	Willie Enslin	2						02/03/1997	09/03/1997
39	Balie Swart	11						02/03/1997	03/04/1998
40	André Vos	50	3				15	02/03/1997	11/05/2002
41	Bruce Thorne	6						02/03/1997	17/05/1997
42	Wickus Venter	3						09/03/1997	22/03/1997
43	Ken Ford	5						09/03/1997	25/04/1997
44	Piet Krause	39	1				5	14/03/1997	11/05/2002
45	Dawie du Toit	9	3	1			17	14/03/1997	17/05/1997
46	Roberto Grau	8						22/03/1997	17/05/1997
47	Riaan van Jaarsveld	9						28/03/1997	08/05/1999
48	James Moss	2						19/04/1997	10/05/1997
49	Armand du Preez	4						19/04/1997	10/05/1997
50	Edrich Lubbe	10	1	5	4		27	25/04/1997	03/05/1998
51	Jacob du Plooy	2						25/04/1997	03/05/1997
52	Morné van der Merwe	1						03/05/1997	03/05/1997
53	Jan Bosch	2						03/05/1997	17/05/1997
54	Francoi Naude	2						10/05/1997	17/05/1997
55	Thinus Delport	39	7				35	28/02/1998	19/05/2001
56	Naka Drotské	23	4				20	28/02/1998	15/04/2005
57	Os du Randt	21	3				15	28/02/1998	23/04/2005
58	Braam Els	10	1				5	28/02/1998	16/05/1998
59	Rassie Erasmus	37	9				45	28/02/1998	19/05/2001
60	Willie Meyer	46	1				5	28/02/1998	11/05/2002
61	MJ Smith	11	1	8	5		36	28/02/1998	29/04/2000
62	Werner Swanepoel	34	5		1		28	28/02/1998	19/05/2001
63	Jan-Harm van Wyk	2	1				5	28/02/1998	07/03/1998
64	André Venter	46	13				65	28/02/1998	19/05/2001
65	AJ Venter	19	3				15	28/02/1998	15/05/1999
66	Charl van Rensburg	7						28/02/1998	16/05/1998
67	Dawie Theron	8						28/02/1998	09/05/1998
68	Philip Smit	20						28/02/1998	15/05/1999
69	Helgard Müller	7	1				5	07/03/1998	16/05/1998
70	Chris Badenhorst	8	3				15	13/03/1998	16/05/1998
71	Hendrik Kruger	11	1	5	3		24	13/03/1998	15/05/1999
72	Harold Myburgh	4						21/03/1998	16/05/1998
73	Jannie de Beer	6		12	14		66	28/03/1998	16/05/1998
74	Tobie de Jager	2						28/03/1998	16/05/1998
75	Luther Bakkes	4						28/03/1998	18/04/1998
76	Jacobus Heymans	16						03/04/1998	15/05/1999
77	Owen Nkumane	2						03/05/1998	16/05/1998
78	Faan Muller	3						03/05/1998	16/05/1998
79	Kobus Engelbrecht	9		4	14		50	16/05/1998	01/04/2000
80	Dirk Groenewald	9	1				5	26/02/1999	20/04/2002
81	Victor Matfield	8						26/02/1999	13/05/2000
82	James Small	2	1				5	26/02/1999	06/03/1999
83	Lourens Venter	3	1				5	26/02/1999	13/03/1999
84	Boeta Wessels	5		1			2	26/02/1999	02/05/1999
85	Chester Williams	20	7				35	26/02/1999	08/04/2001
86	Jerry Nicholas	3						26/02/1999	13/03/1999
87	Danie Vermeulen	8	1				5	06/03/1999	15/05/1999
88	Ricardo Loubscher	5	1				5	06/03/1999	08/05/1999
89	Pieter O'Neill	6		19	9		65	13/03/1999	02/05/1999
90	Hakkies Husselman	8						13/03/1999	08/05/1999
91	Albert van den Berg	7	2				10	20/03/1999	15/05/1999
92	Conrad Stoltz	8	8				40	20/03/1999	15/05/1999
93	Dave von Hoesslin	8						20/03/1999	15/05/1999
94	Chris Kruger	5	3				15	27/03/1999	02/05/1999
95	Basil de Coning	4		1	1		5	03/04/1999	08/05/1999
96	De Waal Venter	2						24/04/1999	08/05/1999
97	Gaffie du Toit	2		1		2	8	08/05/1999	15/05/1999
98	Gideon Watts	1						08/05/1999	08/05/1999
99	Leon Boshoff	30	2				10	26/02/2000	11/05/2002
100	Grant Esterhuizen	35	3				15	26/02/2000	13/05/2006
101	Jannes Labuschagne	52	2				10	26/02/2000	08/05/2009
102	Marius Mostert	23						26/02/2000	19/05/2001
103	Pierre Ribbens	5						26/02/2000	22/04/2000
104	Louis Koen	28	3	41	74	3	328	26/02/2000	11/05/2002
105	Johan Ackermann	24						26/02/2000	19/05/2001
106	Torros Pretorius	3						26/02/2000	11/03/2000
107	Delarey du Preez	34	4				20	26/02/2000	13/05/2006
108	Mac Masina	1						11/03/2000	11/03/2000
109	Jimmy Powell	9	1				5	11/03/2000	11/05/2002
110	Dean Hall	26	2				10	25/03/2000	21/02/2003
111	Adrian Garvey	5						01/04/2000	20/05/2000
112	Walter Minnaar	2	1				5	29/04/2000	13/05/2000
113	Chad Alcock	11	1				5	24/02/2001	19/05/2001
114	Wylie Human	32	8				40	24/02/2001	05/05/2007
115	Heinrich Kok	8						24/02/2001	11/05/2002
116	Eugene Meyer	13	1				5	24/02/2001	08/03/2002
117	Andre van Niekerk	17						24/02/2001	08/05/2004
118	Kleinjan Tromp	30	4				20	24/02/2001	06/05/2006
119	Morne Nel	15						03/03/2001	10/05/2003
120	Clinton van Rensburg	8		3	3		15	03/03/2001	19/05/2001
121	Pieter van Niekerk	26						30/03/2001	13/05/2006
122	Conrad Jantjes	41	8				40	22/04/2001	13/05/2006
123	Russell Winter	22	2				10	28/04/2001	13/05/2006
124	Gcobani Bobo	13	6				30	23/02/2002	10/05/2003
125	Deon de Kock	7						23/02/2002	04/05/2002
126	Boela du Plooy	21	1				5	23/02/2002	15/04/2005
127	Friedrich Lombard	12	2				10	23/02/2002	02/05/2003
128	Willem Stoltz	39	2				10	23/02/2002	17/04/2010
129	Lawrence Sephaka	51						23/02/2002	15/05/2009
130	John Daniels	11	4				20	23/02/2002	11/05/2002
131	Lodewyk Hattingh	10						23/02/2002	11/05/2002
132	Wikus van Heerden	59	6				30	02/03/2002	25/02/2012
133	Grant Bartle	4						02/03/2002	12/04/2002
134	André Pretorius	72	11	102	121	13	663	02/03/2002	09/04/2011
135	Rudi Coetzee	13	2				10	16/03/2002	08/05/2004
136	Danie van Schalkwyk	8						16/03/2002	11/05/2002
137	Jorrie Muller	35	7				35	16/03/2002	17/03/2006
138	Kaya Malotana	2						20/04/2002	26/04/2002
139	Joe van Niekerk	22	2				10	26/04/2002	17/05/2008
140	Pat Barnard	7						21/02/2003	10/05/2003
141	Jaque Fourie	68	23				115	21/02/2003	01/05/2009
142	Norman Jordaan	8	2				10	21/02/2003	10/05/2003
143	Hendro Scholtz	20	1				5	21/02/2003	14/05/2005
144	Bobby Skinstad	10	2			1	13	21/02/2003	02/05/2003
145	Hanyani Shimange	18						21/02/2003	08/05/2004
146	Kennedy Tsimba	6		5	5		25	21/02/2003	10/05/2003
147	Ricky Januarie	43	2				10	21/02/2003	05/05/2007
148	Juan Smith	32	11				55	21/02/2003	14/05/2005
149	Marco Wentzel	10						01/03/2003	10/05/2003
150	Ashwin Willemse	31	7				35	01/03/2003	28/03/2009
151	Adrian Jacobs	4	1				5	01/03/2003	12/04/2003
152	Doppies la Grange	68	5				25	26/04/2003	24/03/2012
153	Nico Breedt	1						10/05/2003	10/05/2003
154	Ettienne Barnard	1						10/05/2003	10/05/2003
155	Anton Pitout	10	2				10	20/02/2004	08/05/2004
156	Faan Rautenbach	1						20/02/2004	20/02/2004
157	Lukas van Biljon	13						20/02/2004	15/04/2006
158	Nel Fourie	5		9	3		27	20/02/2004	08/05/2004
159	Gurthrö Steenkamp	10	1				5	20/02/2004	08/05/2004
160	Pietie Ferreira	11	2				10	20/02/2004	08/05/2004
161	CJ van der Linde	25	1				5	27/02/2004	02/06/2012
162	Gerhard Vosloo	15	2				10	27/02/2004	13/05/2006
163	Gerrie Britz	9	4				20	05/03/2004	08/05/2004
164	Roland Bernard	7						20/03/2004	08/05/2004
165	Paul Delport	11						20/03/2004	14/05/2005
166	Wayne Julies	27	1				5	03/04/2004	13/05/2006
167	Cobus Grobbelaar	94	11				55	01/05/2004	02/06/2012
168	Gordon Gilfillan	17						01/05/2004	16/03/2007
169	Schalk Brits	11						26/02/2005	14/05/2005
170	Michael Claassens	9						26/02/2005	14/05/2005
171	Marius Hurter	15						26/02/2005	22/04/2006
172	Ollie le Roux	3						26/02/2005	29/04/2005
173	Barend Pieterse	11	1				5	26/02/2005	14/05/2005
174	Neil Powell	3						26/02/2005	12/03/2005
175	Tiaan Snyman	10			12		36	26/02/2005	17/03/2006
176	Rich Verster	1						26/02/2005	26/02/2005
177	Chumani Booi	10	1				5	05/03/2005	14/05/2005
178	Dewey Swartbooi	8						12/03/2005	07/05/2005
179	Barry Goodes	6	1				5	19/03/2005	21/03/2009
180	Eddie Fredericks	3						25/03/2005	14/05/2005
181	Nick Eyre	4						25/03/2005	29/04/2005
182	Willem de Waal	4						15/04/2005	07/05/2005
183	Trevor Hall	13						15/04/2005	13/05/2006
184	Christiaan van Rooyen	1						29/04/2005	29/04/2005
185	Ernst Joubert	38	4				20	11/02/2006	01/05/2009
186	Earl Rose	47	8	31	24	2	178	11/02/2006	26/03/2010
187	Jano Vermaak	73	11	3	4		73	11/02/2006	11/06/2011
188	Daniel Muller	7						17/02/2006	28/04/2006
189	Gerhard Mostert	26						15/04/2006	01/05/2009
190	Altenstadt Hulme	5						22/04/2006	23/02/2008
191	Bertus Smit	15						28/04/2006	05/05/2007
192	Willie Wepener	48	2				10	06/05/2006	12/04/2014
193	Willem Alberts	42	4				20	02/02/2007	09/10/2020
194	Jannie Boshoff	24	3				15	02/02/2007	19/03/2011
195	Cobus Grobler	12						02/02/2007	03/05/2008
196	Louis Ludik	36	4				20	02/02/2007	15/05/2009
197	Brian Mujati	13						02/02/2007	05/05/2007
198	Louis Strydom	12		4	18		62	02/02/2007	07/03/2008
199	Heinke van der Merwe	45						02/02/2007	08/05/2010
200	Anton van Zyl	30	1				5	02/02/2007	15/05/2009
201	Franco van der Merwe	83	7				35	02/02/2007	12/07/2014
202	Jaco van Schalkwyk	25	3	1	1	1	23	02/02/2007	17/05/2008
203	Jaco Pretorius	18						10/02/2007	19/04/2008
204	Ethienne Reynecke	20	2				10	10/02/2007	17/05/2008
205	Jacques Cronjé	10						24/02/2007	05/05/2007
206	Geo Cronjé	3						21/04/2007	05/05/2007
207	Colin Lloyd	1						28/04/2007	28/04/2007
208	Rayno Benjamin	12	2				10	16/02/2008	17/05/2008
209	Ross Geldenhuys	19						16/02/2008	15/05/2010
210	RW Kember	1						16/02/2008	16/02/2008
211	Dusty Noble	16	1				5	16/02/2008	05/03/2010
212	Gert-Andries van der Merwe	2						23/02/2008	29/02/2008
213	Chris Jonck	20	1	1	2		13	23/02/2008	17/04/2010
214	Gavin Williamson	1						23/02/2008	23/02/2008
215	Walter Venter	18	1				5	07/03/2008	08/05/2010
216	JC Janse van Rensburg	50	1				5	07/03/2008	14/07/2012
217	Rudi Vogt	5						15/03/2008	03/05/2008
218	Eugene Maqwelana	1						04/04/2008	04/04/2008
219	Dewald Senekal	7						04/04/2008	17/05/2008
220	Justin St Jerry	1						12/04/2008	12/04/2008
221	Wilhelm Koch	4						12/04/2008	10/05/2008
222	Freddie van Zyl	1						10/05/2008	10/05/2008
223	Henno Mentz	10	6				30	13/02/2009	24/04/2009
224	Gert Muller	17						13/02/2009	15/05/2010
225	Hansie van Dyk	15						13/02/2009	24/04/2010
226	Todd Clever	21	3				15	13/02/2009	17/04/2010
227	Rynard Landman	2						13/02/2009	21/02/2009
228	Shandre Frolick	6	1				5	14/03/2009	24/04/2009
229	Deon van Rensburg	54	4				20	04/04/2009	04/07/2014
230	Robert Kruger	34						10/04/2009	02/03/2019
231	Johan van Deventer	3	1				5	01/05/2009	15/05/2009
232	Michael Killian	37	10				50	01/05/2009	26/05/2012
233	Tonderai Chavhanga	11	2				10	13/02/2010	15/05/2010
234	Hannes Franklin	12	2				10	13/02/2010	15/05/2010
235	JP Joubert	6	1				5	13/02/2010	26/03/2010
236	Jacques Lombard	7	1				5	13/02/2010	01/05/2010
237	Wandile Mjekevu	10	4				20	13/02/2010	24/04/2010
238	Jonathan Mokuena	3						13/02/2010	15/05/2010
239	Carlos Spencer	12	3	1			17	13/02/2010	15/05/2010
240	Jacques Coetzee	10						13/02/2010	15/05/2010
241	Derick Minnie	61	6				30	13/02/2010	11/04/2015
242	Charles Emslie	10						13/02/2010	15/05/2010
243	Burton Francis	13		10	11	1	56	13/02/2010	06/05/2011
244	Kevin Buys	13						19/02/2010	14/05/2011
245	George Earle	9						27/02/2010	09/04/2011
246	Wigan Pekeur	4	2				10	12/03/2010	10/04/2010
247	Nico Luus	7						26/03/2010	15/05/2010
248	Marius Delport	5						10/04/2010	15/05/2010
249	Herkie Kruger	6	1	8	10		51	10/04/2010	15/05/2010
250	Wouter Moore	1						24/04/2010	24/04/2010
251	Justin Wheeler	2						24/04/2010	08/05/2010
252	Jaco Taute	31	9		2		51	01/05/2010	26/05/2012
253	Bernado Botha	2						01/05/2010	15/05/2010
254	David Bulbring	3						15/05/2010	02/04/2011
255	Pat Cilliers	28	1				5	19/02/2011	02/06/2012
256	Elton Jantjies	131	14	282	177	6	1,183	19/02/2011	07/11/2020
257	Bandise Maku	14						19/02/2011	11/06/2011
258	Lionel Mapoe	107	30				150	19/02/2011	15/06/2019
259	Waylon Murray	14	3				15	19/02/2011	14/07/2012
260	Josh Strauss	31	8				40	19/02/2011	14/07/2012
261	Warren Whiteley	92	15				75	19/02/2011	11/05/2019
262	James Kamana	17						19/02/2011	14/07/2012
263	Martin Bezuidenhout	23	3				15	19/02/2011	14/07/2012
264	Rory Kockott	12		1	1		5	19/02/2011	04/06/2011
265	Michael Rhodes	11	2				10	12/03/2011	28/05/2011
266	Edgar Marutlulle	8						26/03/2011	11/06/2011
267	Jacobie Adriaanse	27						26/03/2011	05/04/2019
268	David de Villiers	5						09/04/2011	04/06/2011
269	Dries van Schalkwyk	1						16/04/2011	16/04/2011
270	Alwyn Hollenbach	25	2				10	16/04/2011	06/06/2015
271	Dylan des Fountain	6	1				5	06/05/2011	11/06/2011
272	Butch James	16	1	8	10		51	14/05/2011	14/07/2012
273	Jaco Kriel	71	21				105	04/06/2011	17/10/2020
274	Michael Bondesio	7	1				5	25/02/2012	14/07/2012
275	Callie Visagie	16						25/02/2012	14/07/2012
276	Hendrik Roodt	7						25/02/2012	14/07/2012
277	Stephan Greeff	5						02/03/2012	14/04/2012
278	Marius Coetzer	4						10/03/2012	07/04/2012
279	Caylib Oosthuizen	6	1				5	10/03/2012	27/04/2012
280	Andries Coetzee	98	13	6	1	3	89	10/03/2012	14/03/2020
281	Tian Meyer	11	2				10	10/03/2012	30/06/2012
282	Ruan Dreyer	80	4				20	10/03/2012	07/11/2020
283	Ruan Combrinck	70	24	10	4		153	24/03/2012	26/04/2019
284	Paul Willemse	1						07/04/2012	07/04/2012
285	Etienne Oosthuizen	3						07/04/2012	14/07/2012
286	Ross Cronjé	90	7				35	27/04/2012	07/11/2020
287	Grant Hattingh	9	1				5	27/04/2012	14/07/2012
288	Ruan Botha	5						05/05/2012	14/07/2012
289	Anthony Volmink	18	4				20	02/06/2012	28/05/2017
290	Marnitz Boshoff	29	1	25	52	8	235	15/02/2014	28/05/2016
291	Chrysander Botha	9						15/02/2014	31/05/2014
292	Robbie Coetzee	47	5				25	15/02/2014	26/04/2019
293	Faf de Klerk	65	14	1			72	15/02/2014	05/08/2017
294	Franco Mostert	83	4				20	15/02/2014	04/08/2018
295	Julian Redelinghuys	45	1				5	15/02/2014	06/08/2016
296	Schalk van der Merwe	25	1				5	15/02/2014	06/06/2015
297	Stefan Watermeyer	13	2				10	15/02/2014	24/05/2014
298	Jacques van Rooyen	66	5				25	15/02/2014	04/08/2018
299	Warwick Tecklenburg	45	6				30	15/02/2014	06/08/2016
300	Willie Britz	13						15/02/2014	12/07/2014
301	JW Jonker	11						22/02/2014	24/05/2014
302	MB Lusaseni	14						22/02/2014	16/05/2015
303	Coenie van Wyk	8	1				5	22/02/2014	04/07/2014
304	Courtnall Skosan	79	38				190	01/03/2014	07/11/2020
305	Corné Fourie	64	5				25	08/03/2014	04/08/2018
306	Mark Pretorius	2						22/03/2014	02/05/2015
307	Stephan de Wit	4						22/03/2014	30/07/2016
308	Martin Muller	16						05/04/2014	16/07/2016
309	Malcolm Marx	68	30				150	05/04/2014	15/06/2019
310	Rudi Mathee	5						19/04/2014	31/05/2014
311	Akker van der Merwe	50	8				40	03/05/2014	05/08/2017
312	Stokkies Hanekom	6						31/05/2014	16/07/2016
313	Charles Marais	1						31/05/2014	31/05/2014
314	Howard Mnisi	42	2				10	13/02/2015	04/08/2018
315	JP du Preez	1						21/02/2015	21/02/2015
316	Harold Vorster	59	11				55	21/02/2015	08/06/2019
317	Ruaan Lerm	3						21/02/2015	16/07/2016
318	Sampie Mastriet	5						28/02/2015	27/03/2015
319	Jaco van der Walt	22		4	1		11	28/02/2015	18/03/2017
320	Andries Ferreira	46	2				10	14/03/2015	12/05/2018
321	Mark Richards	1						11/04/2015	11/04/2015
322	Lohan Jacobs	1						11/04/2015	11/04/2015
323	Kwagga Smith	50	21				105	23/05/2015	08/06/2019
324	Dillon Smit	27						30/05/2015	09/10/2020
325	Dylan Smith	55	2				10	27/02/2016	17/10/2020
326	Ruan Ackermann	34	6				30	27/02/2016	05/08/2017
327	Rohan Janse van Rensburg	39	19				95	27/02/2016	26/05/2018
328	Fabian Booysen	2						05/03/2016	16/07/2016
329	Jacques Nel	11						12/03/2016	01/07/2017
330	Cyle Brink	45	5				25	19/03/2016	15/06/2019
331	Lourens Erasmus	45	4				20	19/03/2016	04/08/2018
332	JW Bell	2						23/04/2016	30/04/2016
333	Ramone Samuels	3						23/04/2016	16/07/2016
334	Pieter Scholtz	2						30/04/2016	16/07/2016
335	Sylvian Mahuza	37	13				65	14/05/2016	26/04/2019
336	Koch Marx	1						16/07/2016	16/07/2016
337	Ashlon Davids	3						16/07/2016	05/05/2018
338	Clinton Theron	1						16/07/2016	16/07/2016
339	Johannes Jonker	37						25/02/2017	15/06/2019
340	Marvin Orie	43	3				15	11/03/2017	07/11/2020
341	Shaun Reynolds	16	2	7	3		33	11/03/2017	14/03/2020
342	Madosh Tambwe	12	9				45	18/03/2017	26/05/2018
343	Sti Sithole	24	1				5	25/03/2017	07/11/2020
344	Hencus van Wyk	3						25/03/2017	06/05/2017
345	Aphiwe Dyantyi	29	13				65	17/02/2018	15/06/2019
346	Hacjivah Dayimani	31	3				15	17/02/2018	17/10/2020
347	Marnus Schoeman	40	14				70	17/02/2018	07/11/2020
348	Marco Jansen van Vuren	4						24/02/2018	07/04/2018
349	Len Massyn	13						17/03/2018	07/11/2020
350	Nic Groom	21	3				15	20/04/2018	08/06/2019
351	Rhyno Herbst	9	1				5	16/02/2019	15/06/2019
352	Carlü Sadie	26	2				10	16/02/2019	07/11/2020
353	Wandisile Simelane	10	3				15	16/02/2019	07/11/2020
354	Ruan Vermaak	8						16/02/2019	14/03/2020
355	Frans van Wyk	8						16/02/2019	14/03/2020
356	Pieter Jansen	10						16/02/2019	14/03/2020
357	Stephan Lewies	13	1				5	23/02/2019	01/06/2019
358	Gianni Lombard	10			1		3	23/02/2019	07/11/2020
359	Franco Naudé	6						02/03/2019	26/04/2019
360	Vincent Tshituka	17						02/03/2019	07/11/2020
361	James Venter	2						09/03/2019	23/03/2019
362	Nathan McBeth	8						09/03/2019	07/11/2020
363	Tyrone Green	15	2				10	16/03/2019	14/03/2020
364	Jan-Henning Campher	16						16/03/2019	17/10/2020
365	Wilhelm van der Sluys	13						05/04/2019	17/10/2020
366	Reinhard Nothnagel	6	1				5	25/05/2019	07/11/2020
367	Jannie du Plessis	5						02/02/2020	30/10/2020
368	Dan Kriel	10	3				15	02/02/2020	07/11/2020
369	Duncan Matthews	2						02/02/2020	08/02/2020
370	Ruben Schoeman	8						02/02/2020	07/11/2020
371	Tiaan Swanepoel	3						02/02/2020	07/11/2020
372	André Warner	4	1				5	02/02/2020	14/03/2020
373	Mannie Rass	5						02/02/2020	14/03/2020
374	Morné van den Berg	10	1				5	02/02/2020	07/11/2020
375	Jamba Ulengo	5	2				10	28/02/2020	17/10/2020
376	Rabz Maxwane	2	1				5	09/10/2020	17/10/2020
377	Burger Odendaal	4	1				5	09/10/2020	07/11/2020
378	EW Viljoen	2						09/10/2020	17/10/2020
379	Jaco Visagie	4	1				5	09/10/2020	07/11/2020
380	Wiehahn Herbst	2						09/10/2020	17/10/2020
381	MJ Pelser	4	1				5	09/10/2020	07/11/2020
382	Stean Pienaar	2	1				5	30/10/2020	07/11/2020
383	PJ Botha	2						30/10/2020	07/11/2020

=== Super Rugby promotion/relegation playoffs ===
Following the 2012 Super Rugby season, the Lions were removed from the competition for underperformance and replaced by the Southern Kings. Following the 2013 season a promotion/relegation playoff was held to decide whether the Lions or Southern Kings would compete in 2014. Only players who represented the Lions in the 2013 promotion/relegation play-off are listed below, which were only recorded as appearances by the SARU.

No.	Name	Caps	Tries	C	P	DG	Points	Debut	Last
1	Martin Bezuidenhout	2						26/07/2013	03/08/2013
2	Ruan Combrinck	2						26/07/2013	03/08/2013
3	Dylan des Fountain	2						26/07/2013	03/08/2013
4	Stokkies Hanekom	2	2				10	26/07/2013	03/08/2013
5	JC Janse van Rensburg	2						26/07/2013	03/08/2013
6	Elton Jantjies	2		3	6		24	26/07/2013	03/08/2013
7	Jaco Kriel	2	1				5	26/07/2013	03/08/2013
8	Derick Minnie	2	1				5	26/07/2013	03/08/2013
9	Julian Redelinghuys	2						26/07/2013	03/08/2013
10	Hendrik Roodt	2						26/07/2013	03/08/2013
11	Franco van der Merwe	2						26/07/2013	03/08/2013
12	Vian van der Watt	1						26/07/2013	26/07/2013
13	Deon van Rensburg	1						26/07/2013	26/07/2013
14	Anthony Volmink	2						26/07/2013	03/08/2013
15	Warren Whiteley	2						26/07/2013	03/08/2013
16	Warwick Tecklenburg	2						26/07/2013	03/08/2013
17	Chrysander Botha	2						26/07/2013	03/08/2013
18	Guy Cronjé	2						26/07/2013	03/08/2013
19	Robbie Coetzee	2						26/07/2013	03/08/2013
20	Ruan Dreyer	2						26/07/2013	03/08/2013
21	Marnitz Boshoff	1						26/07/2013	26/07/2013
22	Willie Britz	2						26/07/2013	03/08/2013
23	Ross Cronjé	1						03/08/2013	03/08/2013
24	Deon Helberg	1						03/08/2013	03/08/2013

== Pro14/United Rugby Championship players ==
No.	Name	Caps	Tries	C	P	DG	Points	Debut	Last
1	PJ Botha	90	11				55	01/05/2021	23/10/2026
2	Jannie du Plessis	5						01/05/2021	09/04/2022
3	Francke Horn	87	28				140	01/05/2021	30/10/2026
4	Dan Kriel	3						01/05/2021	05/06/2021
5	MJ Pelser	5	2				10	01/05/2021	05/06/2021
6	Stean Pienaar	16	2				10	01/05/2021	23/03/2024
7	Ruben Schoeman	58	6				30	01/05/2021	31/01/2026
8	Wandisile Simelane	20	3				15	01/05/2021	30/04/2022
9	Sti Sithole	30						01/05/2021	23/12/2022
10	Courtnall Skosan	5						01/05/2021	05/06/2021
11	Tiaan Swanepoel	13		4	3		17	01/05/2021	21/05/2022
12	Vincent Tshituka	19	4				20	01/05/2021	21/05/2022
13	Wilhelm van der Sluys	2						01/05/2021	15/10/2021
14	André Warner	25	6				30	01/05/2021	28/01/2023
15	Fred Zeilinga	9	1	9	9		50	01/05/2021	29/01/2022
16	EW Viljoen	13	1	1	4		19	01/05/2021	12/02/2022
17	Carlü Sadie	20						01/05/2021	30/04/2022
18	Hacjivah Dayimani	1						01/05/2021	01/05/2021
19	Reinhard Nothnagel	60						01/05/2021	30/05/2026
20	Morné Brandon	28	7				35	01/05/2021	30/10/2026
21	Nathan McBeth	2						01/05/2021	08/05/2021
22	Manu Tshituka	49	10				50	01/05/2021	01/06/2024
23	Morné van den Berg	82	19	1			97	01/05/2021	30/10/2026
24	Rabz Maxwane	34	14				70	08/05/2021	21/12/2024
25	Jaco Visagie	55	3				15	08/05/2021	17/05/2025
26	Burger Odendaal	18	2				10	08/05/2021	30/04/2022
27	Asenathi Ntlabakanye	70	5				25	08/05/2021	09/05/2026
28	Len Massyn	3						08/05/2021	05/06/2021
29	Jordan Hendrikse	45	3	70	46	1	296	08/05/2021	01/06/2024
30	Willem Alberts	29		1			2	15/05/2021	01/06/2024
31	Ruan Dreyer	42	1				5	15/05/2021	01/06/2024
32	Mannie Rass	32	2				10	22/05/2021	11/10/2025
33	Pieter Jansen van Vuren	14						24/09/2021	28/01/2023
34	Jaco Kriel	17	4				20	24/09/2021	22/04/2023
35	Jamba Ulengo	2	1				5	24/09/2021	01/10/2021
36	Sibusiso Sangweni	27						24/09/2021	20/04/2024
37	Eddie Fouché	2						24/09/2021	01/10/2021
38	Divan Rossouw	4						01/10/2021	05/02/2022
39	Ruhan Straeuli	15	1				5	09/10/2021	25/02/2023
40	Morgan Naudé	31	1				5	09/10/2021	11/05/2025
41	Edwill van der Merwe	65	29				145	04/12/2021	17/05/2025
42	Matt More	3						04/12/2021	21/05/2022
43	Ruan Venter	61	12				60	29/01/2022	09/05/2026
44	PJ Steenkamp	2						05/02/2022	25/02/2022
45	Quan Horn	83	17				85	05/02/2022	30/10/2026
46	JP Smith	41	1				5	12/02/2022	01/06/2024
47	Lunga Ncube	1						25/02/2022	25/02/2022
48	Nico Steyn	35	5	2	2		35	25/02/2022	30/10/2026
49	Henco van Wyk	57	24				120	02/04/2022	30/10/2026
50	Jarod Cairns	28	3				15	21/05/2022	31/01/2026
51	Andries Coetzee	14	3				15	17/09/2022	05/11/2023
52	Marius Louw	49	11				55	17/09/2022	17/05/2025
53	Ruan Smith	15						17/09/2022	06/01/2024
54	Zander du Plessis	6						17/09/2022	04/12/2022
55	Sanele Nohamba	41	7	48	25	1	212	17/09/2022	21/12/2024
56	Gianni Lombard	30	2	26	16		110	17/09/2022	29/11/2025
57	Sango Xamlashe	2						24/09/2022	04/12/2022
58	Darrien Landsberg	43	1				5	04/12/2022	30/05/2026
59	Rynhardt Jonker	23	1				5	23/12/2022	30/05/2026
60	Emile van Heerden	1						06/01/2023	06/01/2023
61	Michael van Vuuren	3						06/01/2023	18/02/2023
62	Ruan Delport	41						18/02/2023	30/10/2026
63	Rhynardt Rijnsburger	5	1				5	25/02/2023	22/04/2023
64	Travis Gordon	2						25/03/2023	15/04/2023
65	Corné Fourie	8						21/10/2023	02/03/2024
66	Richard Kriel	49	9				45	21/10/2023	30/10/2026
67	Hanru Sirgel	14	3				15	28/10/2023	18/05/2024
68	JC Pretorius	51	6				30	05/11/2023	10/10/2026
69	Izan Esterhuizen	8						27/01/2024	17/05/2025
70	Etienne Oosthuizen	26	3				15	17/02/2024	30/10/2026
71	Conraad van Vuuren	22	3				15	17/02/2024	30/10/2026
72	Erich Cronjé	32	9				45	17/02/2024	30/10/2026
73	Tapiwa Mafura	7	1				5	28/09/2024	27/09/2025
74	Kade Wolhuter	7	1	11	10		57	28/09/2024	11/05/2025
75	Franco Marais	22	4				20	28/09/2024	30/05/2026
76	Juan Schoeman	16						28/09/2024	17/05/2025
77	Sibabalo Qoma	20	1				5	28/09/2024	30/10/2026
78	Renzo du Plessis	21	2				10	28/09/2024	28/03/2026
79	Heiko Pohlmann	5						05/10/2024	27/09/2025
80	RF Schoeman	33						19/10/2024	30/10/2026
81	WJ Steenkamp	7	1				5	30/11/2024	05/10/2025
82	Sam Francis	3			4		12	21/12/2024	11/10/2025
83	Raynard Roets	2						21/12/2024	25/01/2025
84	SJ Kotze	32	3				15	25/01/2025	30/10/2026
85	Layton Horn	4						29/03/2025	25/10/2025
86	Kelly Mpeku	19	6				30	19/04/2025	30/10/2026
87	Bronson Mills	15	2				10	26/04/2025	30/10/2026
88	Lubabalo Dobela	5	1	7	2		25	26/04/2025	05/10/2025
89	Angelo Davids	17	3				15	27/09/2025	30/05/2026
90	Dylan Sjoblom	6						27/09/2025	30/10/2026
91	Eduan Keyter	5	3				15	05/10/2025	20/12/2025
92	Chris Smith	23	1	55	23		184	05/10/2025	30/10/2026
93	Sebastian Lombard	10						05/10/2025	10/10/2026
94	Haashim Pead	10	2				10	05/10/2025	30/05/2026
95	Eddie Davids	12						29/11/2025	30/05/2026
96	Batho Hlekani	14	1				5	23/01/2026	23/10/2026
97	Siba Mahashe	14	6				30	21/02/2026	30/10/2026
98	Boeta Chamberlain	5	1	1			7	26/09/2026	30/10/2026
99	Boan Venter	5						26/09/2026	30/10/2026
100	Ethan Adams	3						26/09/2026	10/10/2026
101	Hyron Andrews	3						26/09/2026	10/10/2026
102	Zian Cilliers	2						26/09/2026	23/10/2026
103	JP du Preez	1						10/10/2026	10/10/2026
104	Sikhumbuzo Notshe	2						23/10/2026	30/10/2026
105	Tiaan Lange	1						30/10/2026	30/10/2026

== European Rugby Champions Cup/Challenge Cup players ==
No.	Name	Caps	Tries	C	P	DG	Points	Debut	Last
1	PJ Botha	12	3				15	10/12/2022	17/01/2026
2	Andries Coetzee	9	1		1		8	10/12/2022	06/04/2024
3	Ruan Dreyer	5						10/12/2022	06/04/2024
4	Zander du Plessis	3						10/12/2022	06/04/2024
5	Jaco Kriel	5						10/12/2022	08/04/2023
6	Darrien Landsberg	14						10/12/2022	17/01/2026
7	Gianni Lombard	12	3	7	1		32	10/12/2022	13/12/2025
8	Rabz Maxwane	10	2				10	10/12/2022	10/01/2026
9	Reinhard Nothnagel	7						10/12/2022	17/01/2026
10	Ruben Schoeman	9	1				5	10/12/2022	17/01/2026
11	Sti Sithole	2						10/12/2022	16/12/2022
12	Manu Tshituka	8	3				15	10/12/2022	06/04/2024
13	Edwill van der Merwe	11	5				25	10/12/2022	04/04/2025
14	André Warner	4						10/12/2022	22/01/2023
15	Sango Xamlashe	1						10/12/2022	10/12/2022
16	Asenathi Ntlabakanye	13	1				5	10/12/2022	06/12/2025
17	Jordan Hendrikse	7	1	8	17		72	10/12/2022	06/04/2024
18	JP Smith	8	1				5	10/12/2022	21/01/2024
19	Ruan Venter	8	5				25	10/12/2022	06/12/2025
20	Sanele Nohamba	8	2	13	3		45	10/12/2022	11/01/2025
21	Jaco Visagie	12	3				15	10/12/2022	04/04/2025
22	Rynhardt Jonker	12						10/12/2022	13/12/2025
23	Sibusiso Sangweni	2						10/12/2022	16/12/2022
24	Willem Alberts	7						16/12/2022	06/04/2024
25	Quan Horn	13	5				25	16/12/2022	17/10/2026
26	Pieter Jansen van Vuren	2						16/12/2022	22/01/2023
27	Marius Louw	11	5				25	16/12/2022	04/04/2025
28	Henco van Wyk	8	1				5	16/12/2022	17/10/2026
29	Ruan Smith	7	1				5	16/12/2022	06/04/2024
30	Michael van Vuuren	3						16/12/2022	22/01/2023
31	Morné van den Berg	13	2				10	14/01/2023	17/10/2026
32	Emile van Heerden	2						14/01/2023	22/01/2023
33	Rhynardt Rijnsburger	3						14/01/2023	08/04/2023
34	Ruhan Straeuli	5						14/01/2023	11/01/2025
35	JC Pretorius	12	1				5	14/01/2023	04/04/2025
36	Morgan Naudé	8						22/01/2023	11/01/2025
37	Francke Horn	12	3				15	01/04/2023	17/01/2026
38	Mannie Rass	7	1				5	01/04/2023	13/12/2025
39	Morné Brandon	10	3				15	01/04/2023	17/10/2026
40	Travis Gordon	3						01/04/2023	10/12/2023
41	Ruan Delport	9						08/04/2023	17/10/2026
42	Erich Cronjé	11	1				5	10/12/2023	17/10/2026
43	Corné Fourie	2						10/12/2023	13/01/2024
44	Boldwin Hansen	2						10/12/2023	13/01/2024
45	Etienne Oosthuizen	8						10/12/2023	17/10/2026
46	Raynard Roets	3						10/12/2023	13/01/2024
47	Hanru Sirgel	4						10/12/2023	06/04/2024
48	Nico Steyn	12		1			2	10/12/2023	17/10/2026
49	Conraad van Vuuren	9						10/12/2023	17/10/2026
50	Izan Esterhuizen	7						10/12/2023	04/04/2025
51	Johan Mulder	2						10/12/2023	13/01/2024
52	Richard Kriel	9	1				5	15/12/2023	17/10/2026
53	Stean Pienaar	2						13/01/2024	06/04/2024
54	Kade Wolhuter	2		1	4		11	21/01/2024	14/12/2024
55	Sam Francis	5	1	6	2		23	08/12/2024	13/12/2025
56	Tapiwa Mafura	3	1				5	08/12/2024	18/01/2025
57	Franco Marais	3	1				5	08/12/2024	06/12/2025
58	WJ Steenkamp	4						08/12/2024	13/12/2025
59	SJ Kotze	7						08/12/2024	17/10/2026
60	RF Schoeman	9						08/12/2024	17/10/2026
61	Renzo du Plessis	5	1				5	08/12/2024	17/01/2026
62	Jarod Cairns	5						14/12/2024	13/12/2025
63	Juan Schoeman	4	1				5	14/12/2024	04/04/2025
64	Kelly Mpeku	3	1				5	11/01/2025	17/10/2026
65	Sibabalo Qoma	3						04/04/2025	17/10/2026
66	Eduan Keyter	2						06/12/2025	17/01/2026
67	Bronson Mills	4						06/12/2025	17/10/2026
68	Chris Smith	4		10	4		34	06/12/2025	17/10/2026
69	Eddie Davids	4						06/12/2025	17/01/2026
70	Angelo Davids	3	2				10	13/12/2025	17/01/2026
71	Dylan Sjoblom	3						13/12/2025	17/10/2026
72	Lubabalo Dobela	1						13/12/2025	13/12/2025
73	Leon Lyons	1						13/12/2025	13/12/2025
74	Batho Hlekani	3	1				5	10/01/2026	17/10/2026
75	Sebastian Lombard	1						10/01/2026	10/01/2026
76	Haashim Pead	2						10/01/2026	17/01/2026
77	Siba Mahashe	3						10/01/2026	17/10/2026
78	Sikhumbuzo Notshe	1						17/10/2026	17/10/2026
79	Boan Venter	1						17/10/2026	17/10/2026
80	Tiaan Lange	1						17/10/2026	17/10/2026
81	Boeta Chamberlain	1						17/10/2026	17/10/2026
