= 2025–26 Lions (United Rugby Championship) season =

Lions
- 2025–26 season
- Head coach: Ivan van Rooyen

The 2025–26 season is the Lions' fifth season in the United Rugby Championship, their 30th season of professional rugby and their 136th season of representative rugby since the foundation of their provincial union, the Transvaal Rugby Union. Along with competing in the URC and its South African Shield competition, the club will also participate in the 2025–26 European Rugby Challenge Cup.

In Round 12 of the competition, Lions victory over Stormers gave them an unassailable lead in the URC South African Shield competition. It is the Lions' first Shield victory.

== United Rugby Championship ==
=== Matches ===
The full fixture list for the URC season was released on 21 May 2025.

| 27 September 2025 | (1 BP) Cardiff (Wales) | 33 – 20 | (South Africa) Lions | Cardiff Arms Park |
| 19:45 | Try: Thomas 9'c Winnet 23'c Mann 52'c Loyd 60'c,76' Con: Sheedy (4/5) 10', 24', 53',61, Cards: Thomas (red card) 30' | Report | Try: Venter 27'c, Steenkamp 48'c Con: Dobela (2/2) 28', 49'; Pen: Dobela (2/2) 17', 37' | Attendance: 5 711; Referee: Filippo Russo |

| 11 October 2025 | (1 BP) Benetton (Italy) | 41 – 15 | (South Africa) Lions | Stadio Comunale di Monigo, Treviso |
| 15:00 | Try: R Smith(8'); Lynagh (14', 30', 71', 83'); Ferrari (20'); Con: Umaga (21', 31', 72'); R Smith(84'); Pen: Umaga (42'); Cards: Gallo (yellow card) 53'; Avaca (yellow card) 80' | Report | Try: Ntlabakanye (27') v. Vuuren (78'); Con: CW Smith(28'); Pen: CW Smith (2'); Cards: Jonker (yellow card) 69'; Horn (yellow card) 80'+2 |

| 18 October 2025 | (1 BP) Lions (South Africa) | 29 – 18 | (Wales) Scarlets | Ellis Park Stadium, Johannesburg |
| 12:45 | Try: Horn (25'); Marais (58'); Brandon (70', 74'); Pen: CW Smith (47'); Lombard (53', 81'); Cards: Landsberg (yellow card) 38' | Report; Scoreboard | Try: Roberts (77'); Pen: Costelow (12', 50') | Attendance: 1,771; Referee: Eoghan Cross |

| 25 October 2025 | (1 PT) Lions (South Africa) | 49 – 31 | (Ireland) Ulster (1 PT) | Ellis Park Stadium, Johannesburg |
| 12:45 | Try: SJ Kotze (2'c); Keyter (8'c); Venter (46'c) du Plessis (61'c) van Wyk (71'm) van Vuuren (76'm); Brandon (81'm); Con: CW Smith (3', 9', 47', 62'); Pen: CW Smith (33', 50'); Cards: Ntlabakanye (yellow card) 27' | Report; Highlights | Try: Baloucoune (5'c, 40'm, 52'm); Hume (24'c); McCann (67'c); Con: Doak (6', 24'); Flannery (67') | Attendance: 4,061; Referee: Ben Connor (Wales) |

| 29 November 2025 | (1 BP) Bulls (South Africa) | 33 – 43 | (South Africa) Lions (1 BP) | Loftus Versfeld Stadium, Pretoria |
| 12:00 | Try: Papier (30' c, 33' c); A. van der Merwe (40' m); Johannes (76' c) de Klerk(77' c); Con: Johannes (4/5) (31', 34', 76', 78') | Report | Try: Mpeku (19'c) Steyn (23' c, 74' c); Cairns (36' m); E. Oosthuizen (52' c); Keyter (72' c); Con: CW Smith (5/6) (19', 24', 53', 73', 74'); Pen: CW Smith (11') | Attendance: 14,122; Referee: Aimee Barrett-Theron (South Africa) |

| 20 December 2025 | (1 BP) Stormers (South Africa) | 34 – 27 | (South Africa) Lions (1 BP) | Cape Town Stadium |
| 13:30 | Try: Maart (27'c); Simelane (42'c) de Villiers (53'c); Roos (64'c); Con: Matthee (4/4) (28', 42', 54', 65'); Pen: Matthee (2/2) (38', 60') | Report | Try: Venter (1'c, 40'c); Mpeku (69'c); Con: CW Smith (3/3) (1',40',70'); Pen: CW Smith (2/2) (19', 57') | Attendance: 28,205; Referee: Hanru Van Rooyen |

| 21 February 2026 | (1 BP) Lions (South Africa) | 34 – 22 | (South Africa) Sharks | Ellis Park Stadium, Johannesburg |
| 12:00 | Try: Ntlabakanye 30'c v.d. Berg 33'c Mahashe 44'c Venter 52'c Con: CW Smith (4/4) 31', 34', 45', 53'; Pen: CW Smith (2/2) 4', 19'; Cards: Mills (yellow card) 40'; Marais (yellow card) 65' | | Try: Mbatha 15'c Tino Masere 48'm Julius 80+1'c Con: Masuku (1/2) 16'; Jo Hendrikse (1/1) 80+2'; Pen: Masuku 40+1; Cards: Ja Hendrikse (yellow card) 29' | Attendance: 7 841; Referee: Griffin Colby (SARU) |

| 3 January 2026 | (2 BP) Sharks (South Africa) | 22 – 23 | (South Africa) Lions | Kings Park Stadium, Durban |
| 13:30 | Try: E. Tshituka 15' m Kolisi 25' c Jenkins 39' m van der Merwe 58' m Con: Jo. Hendrikse (1/4) 26' | | Try: Oosthuizen 7' c F. Horn 10' m Pead 80+1' m Con: Smith (1/3) 8'; Pen: Smith (2/2) 4', 32'; Cards: Venter (yellow card) 39' | Attendance: 20,622; Referee: Christopher Allison |

| 23 January 2026 | (1 BP) Ospreys (Wales) | 24 – 24 | (South Africa) Lions (1 BP) | Brewery Field, Bridgend |
| 19:45 | Try: Ratti 24' c Hopkins 34' m Morse 39' c Kasende 63' m Con: Edwards (2/4) 25', 39'; Cards: Lake (yellow card) 27'; Davies (yellow card) 53' | Report | Try: Francke Horn (2) 9' m, 40+4' c PJ Botha 48' m Quan Horn 59' c Con: Smith (2/4) 40+5', 59'; Cards: SJ Kotze (yellow card) 38'; Oosthuizen (yellow card) 66' | Attendance: 4,052; Referee: Federico Vedovelli (ITA) |

| 31 January 2026 | Lions (South Africa) | 17 – 52 | (South Africa) Bulls (1 BP) | Ellis Park Stadium, Johannesburg |
| 12:30 | Try: v.d. Berg 45' c Mills 80+1' c Con: C Smith (2) 46' 80+2'; Pen: Smith 23' | Report | Try: Vorster (2) 10' c, 55' c Grobbelaar 32' m Pollard 38' c Arendse 40' c Papier 66' c Gumede 75' m Johannes 78' c Con: Pollard (5) 11', 39' 40+1', 56', 67'; Johannes 79'; Cards: Arendse (yellow card) 16' | Attendance: 12,571 |

| 28 February 2026 | Lions (South Africa) | 24 – 10 | (South Africa) Stormers | Ellis Park Stadium, Johannesburg |
| 12:30 | Try: Mahashe 22' c van Wyk 26' c Cronjé 45' c Con: Smith (3/3) 23', 26', 46'; Pen: Smith 58'; Cards: van Vuuren (red card) 69'; Qoma (yellow card) 66' | Report | Try: JD Schickerling 55' c Con: Feinberg-Mngomezulu 55'; Pen: Feinberg-Mngomezulu 43' | Attendance: 10,791; Referee: Chris Allison |

| 21 March 2026 | (1 BP) Lions (South Africa) | 54 – 17 | (Scotland) Edinburgh | Ellis Park Stadium, Johannesburg |
| 12:45 | Try: Venter 6' c F. Horn 19'c Landsberg 21' c van den Berg 26' c Mills 44' c Davids (2) 54' c, 67' c Pead 79' m Con: CW Smith (7/7) 7', 20', 22', 27', 45', 55', 69'; Mills (0/1); Cards: F. Horn (yellow card) 39' | Report | Try: Ashman 49' m Douglas 62' m Currie 72' c Con: Scott (1/3) 72' | Attendance: 3,464; Referee: Gianluca Gnecci, (Italy) |

| 28 March 2026 | (1 BP) Lions (South Africa) | 42 – 26 | (Wales) Dragons (1 BP) | Ellis Park Stadium, Johannesburg |
| 14:30 | Try: Mahashe 5' m Kriel 26' c CW Smith 50' c Steyn (2) 55' m, 63' c Cronjé 67' m Con: Smith (3/6) 27', 51', 63'; Pen: Smith (2) 18', 39' | Report | Try: A Owen (2) 15' c, 32' c Dyer (2) 47' c, 70' m Con: O'Brien (3//4) 16', 33', 47'; Cards: Dyer (yellow card) 54' | Attendance: 3,212; Referee: Andrew Brace |

| 18 April 2026 | (1 BP) Lions (South Africa) | 54 – 12 | (Scotland) Glasgow Warriors | Ellis Park Stadium, Johannesburg |
| 16:00 | Try: van Wyk (2) 6' c, 19' c Cronjé 10' m SJ Kotze 40' c Venter 44' c van den Berg 68' c Mahashe 72' c Q. Horn 75'; Con: Chris William Smith (7/8) 7', 19', 41', 45', 69', 73', 76' | | Try: Lancaster 31' c McDowall 58' m Con: Lancaster (1/2) 32' | Attendance: 3,677; Referee: Peter Martin (Ireland) |

| 25 April 2026 | (1 BP) Lions (South Africa) | 33 – 21 | (Ireland) Connacht | Ellis Park Stadium, Johannesburg |
| 15:00 | Try: Davids 5' c van Wyk (2) 22' c, 72' m Mahashe 40' c Cronjé 44' c Con: CW Smith (4/5) 6', 23', 41', 45'; Cards: SJ Kotze (yellow card) 47' | Report, 2 | Try: M Devine (2) 49' c, 77' c Boyle 81' c Con: Gilbert (3/3) 49', 77', 82' | Attendance: 6,881; Referee: Filippo Russo (Italy) |

| 9 May 2026 | (1 BP) Leinster (Ireland) | 31 – 7 | (South Africa) Lions | Aviva Stadium, Dublin |
| 17:30 | Try: J Osborne 2' c Clarkson 24' c Keenan 70' c Ioane 74' m J O'Brien 80' m Con: Prendergast (2/2) 3', 24'; Frawley (1/3) 71' | Report | Try: F. Horn 35' c Con: CW Smith 36' | Attendance: 16,259; Referee: Hollie Davidson (Scotland) |

| 16 May 2026 | Munster (Ireland) | 24 – 17 | (South Africa) Lions (1 BP) | Thomond Park, Limerick |
| 19:45 | Try: O'Connell 7' c Casey 41' c Ahern 54' c Con: JJ Hanrahan (3/3) 8', 42', 54'; Pen: JJ Hanrahan 23'; Cards: A Smith (yellow card) 27'; O'Brien (yellow card) 30' | Report | Try: Q. Horn 14' c Mpeku 35' c Con: CW Smith (2/2) 15', 36'; Pen: CW Smith 60' | Attendance: 12,301; Referee: Andrea Piardi (Italy) |

=== Table ===
| Pos | Team | Pld | W | D | L | PF | PA | PD | TF | TA | TB | LB | Pts | Qualification |
|---|---|---|---|---|---|---|---|---|---|---|---|---|---|---|
| 1 | Glasgow Warriors | 18 | 13 | 0 | 5 | 479 | 338 | +141 | 72 | 48 | 11 | 2 | 65 | Qualification for the Champions Cup and knockout stage |
| 2 | Leinster (CH) | 18 | 12 | 0 | 6 | 515 | 370 | +145 | 77 | 51 | 13 | 2 | 63 | Qualification for the Champions Cup and knockout stage |
| 3 | Stormers | 18 | 12 | 1 | 5 | 504 | 344 | +160 | 63 | 48 | 9 | 1 | 60 | Qualification for the Champions Cup and knockout stage |
| 4 | Bulls (RU) | 18 | 12 | 0 | 6 | 576 | 406 | +170 | 82 | 59 | 10 | 1 | 59 | Qualification for the Champions Cup and knockout stage |
| 5 | Munster | 18 | 11 | 0 | 7 | 396 | 376 | +20 | 59 | 51 | 8 | 3 | 55 | Qualification for the Champions Cup and knockout stage |
| 6 | Cardiff | 18 | 11 | 0 | 7 | 353 | 372 | −19 | 52 | 52 | 7 | 4 | 55 | Qualification for the Champions Cup and knockout stage |
| 7 | Lions | 18 | 10 | 1 | 7 | 532 | 473 | +59 | 73 | 70 | 9 | 3 | 54 | Qualification for the Champions Cup and knockout stage |
| 8 | Connacht | 18 | 10 | 0 | 8 | 442 | 395 | +47 | 62 | 56 | 10 | 4 | 54 | Qualification for the Champions Cup and knockout stage |
| 9 | Ulster | 18 | 9 | 1 | 8 | 494 | 420 | +74 | 72 | 60 | 10 | 4 | 52 | Qualification for the Challenge Cup |
| 10 | Sharks | 18 | 8 | 1 | 9 | 467 | 428 | +39 | 71 | 57 | 9 | 3 | 46 | Qualification for the Challenge Cup |
| 11 | Ospreys | 18 | 7 | 2 | 9 | 376 | 454 | −78 | 55 | 69 | 4 | 3 | 39 | Qualification for the Challenge Cup |
| 12 | Edinburgh | 18 | 7 | 0 | 11 | 362 | 439 | −77 | 57 | 66 | 6 | 4 | 38 | Qualification for the Challenge Cup |
| 13 | Benetton | 18 | 6 | 2 | 10 | 327 | 493 | −166 | 41 | 71 | 4 | 1 | 33 | Qualification for the Challenge Cup |
| 14 | Scarlets | 18 | 4 | 2 | 12 | 361 | 460 | −99 | 52 | 63 | 3 | 5 | 28 | Qualification for the Challenge Cup |
| 15 | Dragons | 18 | 3 | 4 | 11 | 350 | 481 | −131 | 46 | 71 | 4 | 4 | 28 | Qualification for the Challenge Cup |
| 16 | Zebre | 18 | 2 | 0 | 16 | 312 | 587 | −275 | 43 | 85 | 3 | 4 | 15 | Qualification for the Challenge Cup |

Updated to match(es) played on 16 May 2026. Source: UnitedRugby.com
Rules for classification: Tiebreakers for teams tied on points: 1) Number of matches won 2) The difference between points for and points against 3) The number of tries scored 4) The most points scored 5) The difference between tries for and tries against 6) The fewest red cards received 7) The fewest yellow cards received.

=== Play-offs ===
The top eight teams in the regular season standings advance to the knockout stage, a single-elimination tournament culminating in a Grand Final to crown the overall champion.

Teams are seeded based on the regular season standings, with teams ranked 1–4 receiving home field advantage in the quarter-final, with 1 playing 8, 2 playing 7 etc. The top two teams in the standings are seeded so as not to meet until the Grand Final.

Home-field advantage for the semi-finals and Grand Final will be awarded to the highest-ranked team in each tie; the top two teams are therefore guaranteed home advantage until the final for as long as they remain in the tournament, and the top ranked team, Glasgow Warriors, in the standings will be awarded home advantage should they reach the Grand Final. In the build up to the final week of the regular season, it was reported that Glasgow Warriors may be forced to play a semi-final and final outside Scotland due to venue unavailability, although they would technically remain the home team. In the week of the quarter-final, it was announced they would, if they progressed, play their semi-final and Grand Final on home soil, at Murrayfield Stadium, Edinburgh.

Cardiff and Lions both made the play-offs for the first time. Stormers, Glasgow Warriors, Leinster, Munster and Bulls reached their fifth URC play-off phase from five seasons. Glasgow Warriors became the first non-Irish team to top the regular season table and take the number one seeding since they did so themselves in 2019.

Quarter-finals
1 | (Scotland) Glasgow Warriors | 33
8 | (Ireland) Connacht | 21
4 | (South Africa) Bulls | 45
5 | (Ireland) Munster | 14
3 | (South Africa) Stormers | 44
6 | (Wales) Cardiff | 21
2 | (Ireland) Leinster | 59
7 | (South Africa) Lions | 10

Semi-finals
1 | (Scotland) Glasgow Warriors | 21
4 | (South Africa) Bulls | 22
2 | (Ireland) Leinster | 20
3 | (South Africa) Stormers | 11

Final
2 | (Ireland) Leinster | 36
4 | (South Africa) Bulls | 7

Quarter-final

Lions qualified for their first play-offs in the URC, with an away quarter-final against Leinster.

| 30 May 2026 | Leinster (Ireland) (2) | 59 – 10 | (7) (South Africa) Lions | Aviva Stadium, Dublin |
| 19:45 | Try: Sheehan 10' c Keenan 15' c Ryan 40' c Penny 43' m Prendergast 46' c G McCarthy 55' c O'Brien 64' c Lowe (2) 68' c, 80+1' m Con: Prendergast (7/9) 11', 16', 40+1', 47', 56', 65', 69', Cards: Clarkson (yellow card) 35' | Report | Try: van Wyk (2), 36' m, 58' m Cards: Horn (yellow card) 54' | Attendance: 9,493; Referee: Sam Grove-White (Scotland) |

=== URC South African Shield ===
2025–26 United Rugby Championship Regional Shield tables
(South Africa) South African Shield
| | Team | P | W | D | L | PF | PA | PD | TF | TA | TBP | LBP | Pts | Pos overall |
| 1 | (South Africa) Lions | 6 | 4 | 0 | 2 | 168 | 173 | –5 | 21 | 25 | 2 | 1 | 19 | 7 |
| 2 | (South Africa) Sharks | 6 | 3 | 0 | 3 | 143 | 153 | –10 | 21 | 19 | 3 | 1 | 16 | 10 |
| 3 | (South Africa) Stormers | 6 | 3 | 0 | 3 | 132 | 144 | –12 | 16 | 19 | 2 | 0 | 14 | 3 |
| 4 | (South Africa) Bulls | 6 | 2 | 0 | 4 | 165 | 138 | +27 | 24 | 19 | 3 | 1 | 12 | 4 |
If teams are level at any stage, tiebreakers are applied in the following order: 1. number of matches won 2. the difference between points for and points against 3. the number of tries scored 4. the most points scored 5. the difference between tries for and tries against 6. the fewest red cards received 7. the fewest yellow cards received
Green background indicates teams currently leading the regional shield. Upon the conclusion of the regular season, these teams win their respective regional shields. (S) : URC Shield champion

== European Challenge Cup ==
EPCR Challenge Cup Pool 2
| Pos | Team | Pld | W | D | L | PF | PA | PD | TF | TA | TB | LB | Pts | Qualification |
|---|---|---|---|---|---|---|---|---|---|---|---|---|---|---|
| 1 | (Italy) Benetton (2) | 4 | 4 | 0 | 0 | 182 | 89 | +93 | 24 | 11 | 3 | 0 | 19 | Home round of 16 |
| 2 | (England) Newcastle Red Bulls (6) | 4 | 3 | 0 | 1 | 75 | 78 | −3 | 11 | 11 | 1 | 0 | 13 | Home round of 16 |
| 3 | (Wales) Dragons (13) | 4 | 2 | 0 | 2 | 96 | 148 | −52 | 14 | 21 | 1 | 0 | 9 | Away round of 16 |
| 4 | (France) Perpignan (16) | 4 | 1 | 1 | 2 | 111 | 107 | +4 | 14 | 14 | 1 | 1 | 8 | Away round of 16 |
| 5 | (South Africa) Lions | 4 | 1 | 1 | 2 | 90 | 93 | −3 | 11 | 12 | 1 | 1 | 8 | |
| 6 | (France) Lyon | 4 | 0 | 0 | 4 | 87 | 126 | −39 | 13 | 17 | 1 | 2 | 3 | |

Source: EPCR
Rules for classification: Tiebreakers for teams tied on points: 1) Number of matches won; 2) Difference between points for and against; 3) Total number of points for; 4) Aggregate number of points scored in matches between tied teams; 5) Number of matches won excluding the first match, then the second and so on until the tie is settled.

=== Pool Matches ===
| 6 December 2025 | Lions (South Africa) | 18–26 | (Italy) Benetton | Ellis Park Stadium, Johannesburg |
| 15:00 | Try: Mpeku 37' c Venter 45' m Con: C. Smith (1/2) 38'; Pen: C. Smith (2/3) 9', 57'; Cards: Mpeku (yellow card) 66' | Report | Try: Smith 6' m Marin 71' c, 75' m Con: Albornoz (1/2) 72'; Pen: Umaga (1/2) 13'; Albornoz (1/1) 60'; Drop: Albornoz (1/1) 79' | Attendance: 4,120; Referee: Kevin Bralley (France) |

| 13 December 2025 | Newcastle Red Bulls (England) | 14–10 | (South Africa) Lions (1 BP) | Kingston Park, Newcastle |
| 17:30 | Try: Hearle 13' c McCallum 79' c Con: Chamberlain (1/1) 14'; Connon (1/1) 80'; Cards: Fletcher (yellow card) 38' to 48' | Report | Try: Davids 4' c Con: Francis (1/1) 4'; Pen: Francis (1/1) 20'; Cards: Davids (yellow card) 31' | Attendance: 4,703; Referee: Benoit Rousselet (France) |

| 10 January 2026 | (1 BP) Lions (South Africa) | 42–33 | (France) Lyon (1 BP) | Ellis Park Stadium, Johannesburg |
| 17:15 | Try: Hlekani 6' c Kriel 17' c Horn 23' c du Plessis 36' c Davids 45' c Brandon 78' c Con: Smith (6/6) 7', 18', 24', 37', 46', 79' | Report | Try: Mignot 14' c Tchaptchet 39' c Gonzalez 41' m Sarragallet 53' c Parisien 74' c Con: Jackson (4/5) 15', 40', 54', 74'; Cards: Kaabeche (yellow card) 28' | Attendance: 2,542; Referee: Anthony Woodthorpe (England) |

| 17 January 2026 | Perpignan (France) | 20–20 | (South Africa) Lions | Stade Aime Giral, Perpignan |
| 18:30 | Try: Oviedo 28' c Duguivalu 67' c Con: Aucagne (2/2) 29', 68'; Pen: Aucagne (2/3) 3', 72'; Cards: Ruiz (yellow card) 21' | Report | Try: Penalty try 21'; Botha 63' c Con: Smith (1/1) 64'; Pen: Smith (2/2) 24', 56' | Attendance: 9,845; Referee: Filippo Russo (Italy) |

Lions are eliminated at the pool stage.
