= 2025–26 Bulls (rugby union) season =

Season of South African rugby union team

Bulls
- 2025–26 season
- Head coach: Johan Ackermann
- United Rugby Championship: finalists
- Champions Cup: Round of 16
- Top try scorer: League: Embrose Papier – 12
- Top points scorer: League: Handré Pollard – 127
- Highest home attendance: 33,280 (Rd 8 v Stormers)
- Lowest home attendance: 2,992 (Rd 1 v Ospreys)

The 2025–26 season will be the Bulls' fifth season in the United Rugby Championship, their 31st season of professional rugby. Along with competing in the URC itself and its South African Shield competition, the club will also participate in the 2025-26 European Rugby Champions Cup.

== Squad and personnel ==
=== Players in ===
- (South Africa) Nico Janse van Rensburg from (France) Montpellier
- (South Africa) Handré Pollard from (England) Leicester Tigers
- (South Africa) Jeandre Rudolph from (South Africa) Cheetahs
- (South Africa) Jan Serfontein from (France) Montpellier
- (South Africa) Paul de Wet from (South Africa) Stormers
- (South Africa) Neil le Roux from (England) Bath

=== Players out ===
- (South Africa) Bernard van der Linde to (England) Bath
- (South Africa) Tielman Nieuwoudt to (South Africa) Cheetahs
- (South Africa) Boeta Chamberlain to (England) Newcastle Red Bulls
- (South Africa) Cornel Smit to (Wales) Cardiff
- (South Africa) Aphiwe Dyantyi to (France) Narbonne

== United Rugby Championship ==
=== Matches ===
The full list of fixtures for the 2025–26 season were released by the league on 21 March 2025.

27 September 2025	(1 BP) Bulls (South Africa)	53–40	(Wales) Ospreys (1 BP)	Loftus Versfeld Stadium, Pretoria
13:00	Try: Coetzee (2) 8' c, 21' m Grobbelaar (3) 39' c, 45' m, 58' c Jooste (2) 51' m, 72' m Serfontein 61' m Else 68' c Con: Johannes (4) 9', 40', 59', 69'	Report	Try: Giles (2) 2', 80'; Keiran Williams (2) 6', 35'; Walsh 30'; Morse 66'; Con: Edwards (5) 6', 31', 36', 66', 80+1'	Attendance: 2,992; Referee: Peter Martin (Ireland)

4 October 2025	(1 BP) Bulls (South Africa)	39–31	(Ireland) Leinster (1 BP)	Loftus Versfeld Stadium, Pretoria
17:30	Try: De Klerk 4' c Kriel (2) 16' m, 78' c Gumede 41' c Le Roux 58' m Jacobs 68' m Con: Johannes (2) 5', 42'; Kriel 79'; Pen: Johannes 35'	Report	Try: Clarkson 30' c Cooney 44' c T. O'Brien 46' c Penny 66' c Con: Prendergast (4) 31', 45', 47', 66'; Pen: Prendergast 20'; Cards: Connors (yellow card) 21'	Attendance: 6,937; Referee: Adam Jones (Wales)

11 October 2025	(1 BP) Ulster (Ireland)	28–7	(South Africa) Bulls	Ravenhill Stadium, Belfast
19:45	Try: McCloskey 22' c Augustus 49' c Herring 54' c Izuchukwu 57' c Con: Doak (4) 22', 50', 55', 58'; Cards: Herring (yellow card) 27'	Report	Try: Louw 27' c Con: Pollard 28'; Cards: Rudolph (yellow card) 47'	Attendance: 10,629; Referee: Mike Adamson (Scotland)

17 October 2025	(1 BP) Connacht (Ireland)	27–28	(South Africa) Bulls	The Sportsground, Galway
19:45	Try: Ioane 10' c Blade 45' c Naughton 68' m Hansen 79' m Con: Ioane (2) 11', 46'; Pen: Naughton 74'; Cards: Murphy (red card) 19'	report	Try: de Wet (2) 13' m, 54' c le Roux 20' c Con: Johannes (2) 21', 55'; Pen: Johannes (2) 63', 72'; Drop: Johannes 43'	Attendance: 4,000; Referee: Mike Adamson (Scotland)

24 October 2025	Glasgow Warriors (Scotland)	21–12	(South Africa) Bulls	Scotstoun Stadium, Glasgow
19:45	Try: Tuipulotu 5' c Penalty try 65'; McBeth 70' c Con: Hastings (2) 6', 71'; Cards: McBeth (yellow card) 53'	Report	Try: Jacobs 11' m le Roux 49' c Con: Johannes 49'; Cards: Klopper (yellow card) 65'	Attendance: 6,848; Referee: Craig Evans (Wales)

29 November 2025	(1 BP) Bulls (South Africa)	33–43	(South Africa) Lions (1 BP)	Loftus Versfeld Stadium, Pretoria
12:00	Try: Papier (2) 30' c, 33' c Van der Merwe 40' m Johannes 76' c De Klerk 77' c Con: Johannes (4/5) (31', 34', 76', 78')	Report	Try: Mpeku 19' c Steyn (2) 23' c, 74' c Cairns 36' m E. Oosthuizen 52' c Keyter 72' c Con: CW Smith (5/6) 19', 24', 53', 73', 74'; Pen: CW Smith (11')	Attendance: 14,122; Referee: Aimee Barrett-Theron (South Africa)

20 December 2025	Sharks (South Africa)	21–12	(South Africa) Bulls	Kings Park Stadium, Durban
16:00	Try: Kunene 15' c Kolisi 71' c Van der Merwe 77' c Con: Hendrikse 16'; Whitehead (2) 72', 78'	Report	Pen: Pollard (4) 19', 24', 38', 57'; Cards: Kriel (yellow card) 29'	Attendance: 44,517; Referee: Griffin Colby (South Africa)

3 January 2026	Stormers (South Africa)	13–8	(South Africa) Bulls (1 BP)	Cape Town Stadium
16:00	Try: Roos 39' m Mchunu 79' m Pen: Feinberg-Mngomezulu 35'		Try: Pollard 31'; Pen: Pollard 44 ' Cards: le Roux (yellow card) 35'	Attendance: 53,682; Referee: Griffin Colby (South Africa)

23 January 2026	(1 BP) Edinburgh (Scotland)	17–19	(South Africa) Bulls	Edinburgh Rugby Stadium
19:45	Try: Van der Merwe 6' m Schoeman 17' m Rae 34' c Con: Thompson (1/3) 25'	Report	Try: Coetzee 12' m Grobbelaar 44' c Van Staden 70' c Con: Pollard (2/3) 45', 71'	Attendance: 6,648; Referee: Gianluca Gnecchi (Italy)

31 January 2026	Lions (South Africa)	17–52	(South Africa) Bulls (1 BP)	Ellis Park Stadium, Johannesburg
12:30	Try: Van den Berg 45' c Mills 80+1' c Con: C. Smith (2) 46' 80+2'; Pen: Smith 23'	Report	Try: Vorster (2) 10' c, 55' c Grobbelaar 32' m Pollard 38' c Arendse 40' c Papier 66' c Gumede 75' m Johannes 78' c Con: Pollard (5) 11', 39' 40+1', 56', 67'; Johannes 79'; Cards: Arendse (yellow card) 16'	Attendance: 12,571; Referee: Morné Ferreira (South Africa)

28 February 2026	(1 BP) Bulls (South Africa)	41–12	(South Africa) Sharks	Loftus Versfeld Stadium, Pretoria
15:00	Try: Moodie 15' m de Klerk 27' m Papier (2) 30' c, 37' m Vorster (2) 65' c, 79' m de Wet 69' c Con: Pollard (3) 31', 66', 70'	Report	Try: Van der Merwe 48'; Jacobs 62'; Con: Hendrikse 63'	Attendance: 32,672; Referee: Morné Ferreira (South Africa)

14 March 2026	Bulls (South Africa)	19–32	(South Africa) Stormers (1BP)	Loftus Versfeld Stadium, Pretoria
12:00	Try: Penalty try 19'; Burger 67' c Arendse 79' m Con: Pollard (1/2) 68'; Cards: Wiese (yellow card) 64'; Van Staden (yellow card) 66'		Try: Willemse 31' c De Villiers 57' m Penalty try 66'; Daymani 70' c Con: Feinberg-Mngomezulu (2/3) 31', 70'; Pen: Feinberg-Mngomezulu (2/4) 40', 51'; Cards: A. Smith (yellow card) 14'; Dixon (yellow card) 19'	Attendance: 33,280; Referee: Marius van der Westhuizen (South Africa)

20 March 2026	(1 BP) Bulls (South Africa)	40–7	(Wales) Cardiff	Loftus Versfeld Stadium, Pretoria
17:00	Try: Coetzee 9' c Grobbelaar 14' m Kriel 27' c Papier 35' c Louw 40' c Vermaak 57' c Con: Pollard (4/5) 10', 28', 36', 41'; Kriel (1/1) 58'	Report	Try: Millard 3' c Con: Sheedy (1/1) 4'; Cards: Lawrence (yellow card) 8'	Attendance: 6,603; Referee: Eoghan Cross (Ireland)

21 March 2026	(1 BP) Sharks (South Africa)	45–0	(Ireland) Munster	Kings Park Stadium, Durban
15:00	Try: Buthelezi 7' c Giliomee 28' m Ganyane 51' c Van Heerden 57' c Malan 77' c Mapimpi (2) 79' c, 80+1' m Con: Hendrikse (3/4) 8', 51', 58'; J. Smith (2/3) 78' , 80'	Report		Attendance: 14,539; Referee: Sam Grove-White (Scotland)

17 April 2026	Dragons (Wales)	7–47	(South Africa) Bulls (1 BP)	Rodney Parade, Newport
19:45	Try: Inisi 23' c Con: Evans 24'	Report	Try: Papier 11' c Grobbelaar 37' m Coetzee 44' c Van Staden (2) 57' c, 74' c Williams 77' c Petersen 80' c Con: Pollard (3/4) 11', 45', 58'; Kriel (3/3) 75', 78', 81'	Attendance: 5,892; Referee: Sam Grove-White (Scotland)

25 April 2026	(1 BP) Scarlets (Wales)	21–23	(South Africa) Bulls	Parc y Scarlets, Llanelli
19:45	Try: Woolley 9' m James 20' m Anderson 50' m Pen: Hawkins (2) 63', 75'	Report	Try: Jooste 3' c Pollard 28' c Con: Pollard (2/2) 4', 29'; Pen: Pollard (3) 57', 69', 81'; Cards: Gans (yellow card) 44' klopper (yellow card) 49'	Attendance: 5,180; Referee: Gianluca Gnecchi (Italy)

9 May 2026	(1 BP) Bulls (South Africa)	54–19	(Italy) Zebre Parma	Loftus Versfeld Stadium, Pretoria
12:45	Try: le Roux 3' c Moodie 14' c Jooste 23' m Petersen 30' c Vermaak 49' c Hanekom 63' c Vorster 69' c Rudolph 77' c Con: Le Roux (7/8) 4', 15', 31', 50', 63', 70', 78'	Report	Try: Trulla 20' c Ribaldi 41' m Dominguez 59' c Con: Roger (2/3) 21', 60'	Attendance: 5,685; Referee: Ben Whitehouse (Wales)

16 May 2026	(1 BP) Bulls (South Africa)	45–19	(Italy) Benetton	Loftus Versfeld Stadium, Pretoria
15:00	Try: Petersen (2) 4' c, 57' c Le Roux 13' c Grobbelaar 29' m Wiese 38' c Gumede 63' c Nortjé 75' m Con: Pollard (5/7) 5', 13', 38', 58', 64'	Report	Try: Lynagh (2) 19' m, 42' c R. Smith 40' c Con: R. Smith (2/3) 40', 43'; Cards: Garbisi (yellow card) 32'	Attendance: 10,521; Referee: Craig Evans (Wales)

=== Table ===
Pos	Team	Pld	W	D	L	PF	PA	PD	TF	TA	TB	LB	Pts	Qualification
1	Glasgow Warriors	18	13	0	5	479	338	+141	72	48	11	2	65	Qualification for the Champions Cup and knockout stage
2	Leinster (CH)	18	12	0	6	515	370	+145	77	51	13	2	63	Qualification for the Champions Cup and knockout stage
3	Stormers	18	12	1	5	504	344	+160	63	48	9	1	60	Qualification for the Champions Cup and knockout stage
4	Bulls (RU)	18	12	0	6	576	406	+170	82	59	10	1	59	Qualification for the Champions Cup and knockout stage
5	Munster	18	11	0	7	396	376	+20	59	51	8	3	55	Qualification for the Champions Cup and knockout stage
6	Cardiff	18	11	0	7	353	372	−19	52	52	7	4	55	Qualification for the Champions Cup and knockout stage
7	Lions	18	10	1	7	532	473	+59	73	70	9	3	54	Qualification for the Champions Cup and knockout stage
8	Connacht	18	10	0	8	442	395	+47	62	56	10	4	54	Qualification for the Champions Cup and knockout stage
9	Ulster	18	9	1	8	494	420	+74	72	60	10	4	52	Qualification for the Challenge Cup
10	Sharks	18	8	1	9	467	428	+39	71	57	9	3	46	Qualification for the Challenge Cup
11	Ospreys	18	7	2	9	376	454	−78	55	69	4	3	39	Qualification for the Challenge Cup
12	Edinburgh	18	7	0	11	362	439	−77	57	66	6	4	38	Qualification for the Challenge Cup
13	Benetton	18	6	2	10	327	493	−166	41	71	4	1	33	Qualification for the Challenge Cup
14	Scarlets	18	4	2	12	361	460	−99	52	63	3	5	28	Qualification for the Challenge Cup
15	Dragons	18	3	4	11	350	481	−131	46	71	4	4	28	Qualification for the Challenge Cup
16	Zebre	18	2	0	16	312	587	−275	43	85	3	4	15	Qualification for the Challenge Cup

Updated to match(es) played on 16 May 2026. Source: UnitedRugby.com
Rules for classification: Tiebreakers for teams tied on points: 1) Number of matches won 2) The difference between points for and points against 3) The number of tries scored 4) The most points scored 5) The difference between tries for and tries against 6) The fewest red cards received 7) The fewest yellow cards received.

=== Play-offs ===
The top eight teams in the regular season standings advance to the knockout stage, a single-elimination tournament culminating in a Grand Final to crown the overall champion.

Teams are seeded based on the regular season standings, with teams ranked 1–4 receiving home field advantage in the quarter-final, with 1 playing 8, 2 playing 7 etc. The top two teams in the standings are seeded so as not to meet until the Grand Final.

Home-field advantage for the semi-finals and Grand Final will be awarded to the highest-ranked team in each tie; the top two teams are therefore guaranteed home advantage until the final for as long as they remain in the tournament, and the top ranked team, Glasgow Warriors, in the standings will be awarded home advantage should they reach the Grand Final. In the build up to the final week of the regular season, it was reported that Glasgow Warriors may be forced to play a semi-final and final outside Scotland due to venue unavailability, although they would technically remain the home team. In the week of the quarter-final, it was announced they would, if they progressed, play their semi-final and Grand Final on home soil, at Murrayfield Stadium, Edinburgh.

Cardiff and Lions both made the play-offs for the first time. Stormers, Glasgow Warriors, Leinster, Munster and Bulls reached their fifth URC play-off phase from five seasons. Glasgow Warriors became the first non-Irish team to top the regular season table and take the number one seeding since they did so themselves in 2019.

Quarter-finals
1	(Scotland) Glasgow Warriors	33
8	(Ireland) Connacht	21
4	(South Africa) Bulls	45
5	(Ireland) Munster	14
3	(South Africa) Stormers	44
6	(Wales) Cardiff	21
2	(Ireland) Leinster	59
7	(South Africa) Lions	10

Semi-finals
1	(Scotland) Glasgow Warriors	21
4	(South Africa) Bulls	22
2	(Ireland) Leinster	20
3	(South Africa) Stormers	11

Final
2	(Ireland) Leinster	36
4	(South Africa) Bulls	7

Quarter-final

30 May 2026	Bulls (South Africa) (4)	45–14	(5) (Ireland) Munster	Loftus Versfeld Stadium, Pretoria
13:00	Try: Papier (2) 5' c, 54' c Arendse 8' c Grobbelaar 35' c Hanekom 39' c Jacobs 59' c Con: Pollard (6/6) 5', 10', 36', 40', 54', 60'; Pen: Pollard 23'	Report	Try: O'Donoghue 20' c Nankivell 32' c Con: Hanrahan (2/2) 20', 33'	Attendance: 18,756; Referee: Andrea Piardi (Italy)

Semi-final

6 June 2026	Glasgow Warriors (Scotland) (1)	21–22	(4) (South Africa) Bulls	Murrayfield Stadium, Edinburgh
14:30	Try: Steyn (2) 15' c, 19' c Penalty try 35'; Con: Lancaster (2/2) 16', 20'; Cards: Cummings (yellow card) 44'	Report	Try: Grobbelaar 32' c Papier 45' m Klopper 53' c Con: Pollard (2/3) 32', 54'; Pen: Pollard 7'; Cards: Pollard (yellow card) 9'; Nortjé (yellow card) 25'	Attendance: 17,981; Referee: Andrew Brace (Ireland)

=== Grand Final ===
19 June 2026	Leinster (Ireland) (2)	v	(4) (South Africa) Bulls	Croke Park, Dublin
19:30

=== URC South African Shield ===
2025–26 United Rugby Championship Regional Shield tables
(South Africa) South African Shield
	Team	P	W	D	L	PF	PA	PD	TF	TA	TBP	LBP	Pts	Pos overall
1	(South Africa) Lions	6	4	0	2	168	173	–5	21	25	2	1	19	7
2	(South Africa) Sharks	6	3	0	3	143	153	–10	21	19	3	1	16	10
3	(South Africa) Stormers	6	3	0	3	132	144	–12	16	19	2	0	14	3
4	(South Africa) Bulls	6	2	0	4	165	138	+27	24	19	3	1	12	4
If teams are level at any stage, tiebreakers are applied in the following order: 1. number of matches won 2. the difference between points for and points against 3. the number of tries scored 4. the most points scored 5. the difference between tries for and tries against 6. the fewest red cards received 7. the fewest yellow cards received
Green background indicates teams currently leading the regional shield. Upon the conclusion of the regular season, these teams win their respective regional shields. (S) : URC Shield champion

== European Rugby Champions Cup ==
=== Pool stage ===
Bulls were drawn in Pool 4 of the 2025-26 European Rugby Champions Cup alongside URC rivals Scarlets (who they did not meet in the pool stage as per the rules of the competition), as well as reigning European champions Bordeaux and Pau from France, and Bristol Bears and last year's Champions Cup runners up Northampton Saints from the English Premiership.

European Rugby Champions Cup Pool 4
Pos	Team	Pld	W	D	L	PF	PA	PD	TF	TA	TB	LB	Pts	Qualification
1	(France) Bordeaux Bègles (1)	4	4	0	0	173	97	+76	27	14	4	0	20	Home Champions Cup round of 16
2	(England) Northampton Saints (5)	4	3	0	1	156	110	+46	23	16	4	0	16	Home Champions Cup round of 16
3	(England) Bristol Bears (10)	4	3	0	1	154	104	+50	23	13	2	0	14	Away Champions Cup round of 16
4	(South Africa) Bulls (15)	4	1	0	3	113	181	−68	17	27	3	0	7	Away Champions Cup round of 16
5	(France) Pau (12CC)	4	1	0	3	110	160	−50	15	23	1	1	6	Away Challenge Cup round of 16
6	(Wales) Scarlets	4	0	0	4	103	157	−54	13	24	2	1	3	

Source: EPCR
Rules for classification: Tiebreakers for teams tied on points: 1) Number of matches won; 2) Difference between points for and against; 3) Total number of points for; 4) Aggregate number of points scored in matches between tied teams; 5) Number of matches won excluding the first match, then the second and so on until the tie is settled.

6 December 2025	(1 BP) Bulls (South Africa)	33–46	(France) Bordeaux Bègles (1 BP)	Loftus Versfeld Stadium, Pretoria
16:15	Try: De Klerk 8' c Ludwig 20' c Van der Merwe 25' c Moodiee 37' m Rudolph 39' c Con: Pollard (4/5) 9', 21', 26', 40'; Cards: Kriel (yellow card) 42'; Pollard (yellow card) 52'	Report	Try: Penaud 4' c Bielle-Biarrey (2) 11' c, 61' c Lamothe 23' m Palu 49' m Jalibert 69' c Rayasi 71' m Con: Jalibert (2/3) 5', 12'; Lucu (2/3) 62', 70'; Pen: Jalibert (1/1) 34'	Attendance: 7,327; Referee: Karl Dickson (England)

14 December 2025	(1 BP) Northampton Saints (England)	50–5	(South Africa) Bulls	Franklin's Gardens, Northampton
15:15	Try: Sleightholme (2) 8' c, 61' m Hendy (3) 32' c, 48' c, 68' m Pollock 56' c Coles 59' c Kemeny 79' m Con: Smith (5/8) 9', 33', 49', 57', 59'	Report	Try: Jacobs 22' m Cards: Tshakweni (yellow card) 53'	Attendance: 14,574; Referee: Hollie Davidson (Scotland)

10 January 2026	(1 BP) Bulls (South Africa)	49–61	(England) Bristol Bears (1 BP)	Loftus Versfeld Stadium, Pretoria
14:00	Try: Rudolph 13' c Jacobs (2) 18' c, 27' c Kriel 43' c de Klerk 72' c le Roux 74' c Con: Pollard (6/6) 13', 19', 28', 44', 72', 75'; Cards: le Roux (yellow card) 56'	Report	Try: Van Rensburg 2' c Lahiff 5' c Heward (3) 7' c, 21' c, 41' m Ravouvou (2) 15' c, 59' c Marmion 24' c Rubiolo 56' c Con: Jordan (8/9) 3', 6', 8', 15', 22', 25', 57', 60'; Cards: Lane (yellow card) 38'	Attendance: 11,016; Referee: Pierre Brousset (France)

16 January 2026	(1 BP) Pau (France)	24–26	(South Africa) Bulls (1 BP)	Stade du Hameau, Pau
20:00	Try: Delhommel (2) 9' c, 39' c Maximin 32’ c Con: Mondinat (1/1) 10'; Souverbie (2/2) 33', 40'; Pen: Souverbie 48'; Cards: Leclayat (yellow card) 69'	Report	Try: Gumede 3' m Van der Merwe, 29' c Jooste 57' c Carr 73' c Con: Pollard (3/4) 30', 58', 73'; Cards: Ludwig (yellow card) 38'	Attendance: 12,728; Referee: Karl Dickson (England)

=== Knockout stage ===
Round of 16
1	(France) Bordeaux Bègles	64
16	(England) Leicester Tigers	14
8	(France) Toulouse	59
9	(England) Bristol Bears	26
4	(England) Bath	31
13	(England) Saracens	22
5	(England) Northampton Saints	49
12	(France) Castres	41
2	(Scotland) Glasgow Warriors	25
15	(South Africa) Bulls	21
7	(France) Toulon	28
10	(South Africa) Stormers	27
3	(Ireland) Leinster	49
14	(Scotland) Edinburgh	31
6	(England) Harlequins	17
11	(England) Sale Sharks	26

Quarter-finals
1	(France) Bordeaux Bègles	30
8	(France) Toulouse	15
4	(England) Bath	43
5	(England) Northampton Saints	41
2	(Scotland) Glasgow Warriors	19
7	(France) Toulon	22
3	(Ireland) Leinster	43
11	(England) Sale Sharks	13

Semi-finals
1	(France) Bordeaux Bègles	38
4	(England) Bath	26
3	(Ireland) Leinster	29
7	(France) Toulon	25

Final
1	(France) Bordeaux Bègles	41
3	(Ireland) Leinster	19

Bulls were drawn against URC rivals Glasgow Warriors in the round of 16.

4 April 2026	Glasgow Warriors (Scotland) (2)	25–21	(15) (South Africa) Bulls	Scotstoun Stadium, Glasgow
17:30	Try: Williamson 17' c Dempsey 33' m Schickerling 56' m McDowall 71' m Con: Lancaster (1/4) 18'; Pen: Hastings (1/1) 80'	Report	Try: Grobbelaar 25' m Van Staden 76' c Con: Kriel (1/1) 77'; Pen: Pollard (3/3) 12', 31', 39'; Cards: Louw (yellow card) 79'	Attendance: 7,321; Referee: Pierre Brousset (France)
