= 2025–26 Stormers season =

Stormers
- Full name: DHL Stormers
- Union: (South Africa) SARU
- Founded: 1883 (Western Province Rugby Union); 1997 (Stormers franchise)
- Location: Cape Town, South Africa
- Region: Cape Town; Cape Winelands or Boland; West Coast
- Ground: Cape Town Stadium (Capacity: 55,000)
- Coach: John Dobson
- Captain(s): Salmaan Moerat; Neethling Fouche
- League(s): United Rugby Championship; European Rugby Champions Cup
1st kit	2nd kit

Official website
- www.stormers.co.za
- Current season

The 2025–26 season will be the Stormers's fifth season in the United Rugby Championship and thirtieth season of professional rugby. Along with competing in the URC and its South African Shield competition, the club will also participate in the 2025-26 European Rugby Champions Cup.

== Squad ==
=== Players in ===
- (South Africa) Cobus Reinach from (France) Montpellier
- (South Africa) Ntuthuko Mchunu from (South Africa) Sharks
- (South Africa) Ruan Ackermann from (England) Gloucester
- (South Africa) Hencus van Wyk from (South Africa) Cheetahs
- (Scotland) Oli Kebble from (France) Oyonnax
- (South Africa) Vernon Paulo from (South Africa) Cheetahs
- (South Africa) Hacjivah Dayimani from (France) Racing 92

=== Players out ===
- (South Africa) Herschel Jantjies to (France) Bayonne
- (South Africa) Brok Harris (retired)
- (England) Ben Loader to (England) Gloucester
- (South Africa) Joseph Dweba to (England) Exeter Chiefs
- (South Africa) Paul de Wet to (South Africa) Bulls
- (South Africa) Angelo Davids to (South Africa) Lions
- (South Africa) Manie Libbok to (Japan) Hanazono Kintetsu Liners

== 2025–26 United Rugby Championship ==
=== Table ===
Pos	Team	Pld	W	D	L	PF	PA	PD	TF	TA	TB	LB	Pts	Qualification
1	Glasgow Warriors	18	13	0	5	479	338	+141	72	48	11	2	65	Qualification for the Champions Cup and knockout stage
2	Leinster (CH)	18	12	0	6	515	370	+145	77	51	13	2	63	Qualification for the Champions Cup and knockout stage
3	Stormers	18	12	1	5	504	344	+160	63	48	9	1	60	Qualification for the Champions Cup and knockout stage
4	Bulls (RU)	18	12	0	6	576	406	+170	82	59	10	1	59	Qualification for the Champions Cup and knockout stage
5	Munster	18	11	0	7	396	376	+20	59	51	8	3	55	Qualification for the Champions Cup and knockout stage
6	Cardiff	18	11	0	7	353	372	−19	52	52	7	4	55	Qualification for the Champions Cup and knockout stage
7	Lions	18	10	1	7	532	473	+59	73	70	9	3	54	Qualification for the Champions Cup and knockout stage
8	Connacht	18	10	0	8	442	395	+47	62	56	10	4	54	Qualification for the Champions Cup and knockout stage
9	Ulster	18	9	1	8	494	420	+74	72	60	10	4	52	Qualification for the Challenge Cup
10	Sharks	18	8	1	9	467	428	+39	71	57	9	3	46	Qualification for the Challenge Cup
11	Ospreys	18	7	2	9	376	454	−78	55	69	4	3	39	Qualification for the Challenge Cup
12	Edinburgh	18	7	0	11	362	439	−77	57	66	6	4	38	Qualification for the Challenge Cup
13	Benetton	18	6	2	10	327	493	−166	41	71	4	1	33	Qualification for the Challenge Cup
14	Scarlets	18	4	2	12	361	460	−99	52	63	3	5	28	Qualification for the Challenge Cup
15	Dragons	18	3	4	11	350	481	−131	46	71	4	4	28	Qualification for the Challenge Cup
16	Zebre	18	2	0	16	312	587	−275	43	85	3	4	15	Qualification for the Challenge Cup

Updated to match(es) played on 16 May 2026. Source: UnitedRugby.com
Rules for classification: Tiebreakers for teams tied on points: 1) Number of matches won 2) The difference between points for and points against 3) The number of tries scored 4) The most points scored 5) The difference between tries for and tries against 6) The fewest red cards received 7) The fewest yellow cards received.

=== Fixtures and results ===
The URC released the full fixture list for the new season on 21 May 2025.

26 September 2025	(1 BP) Stormers (South Africa)	35 – 0	(Ireland) Leinster	Cape Town Stadium
18:00	Try: Ungerer (45'); Roos (63' 68'); Matthee (71'); Con: Matthee (45' 64' 69'); Pen: Matthee (7' 33' 42')	Report	Cards: Deegan (yellow card) 63' to 73'; T. O'Brien (yellow card) 67' to 77'	Attendance: 13 529; Referee: Gianluca Gnecchi

3 October 2025	Stormers (South Africa)	26 – 10	(Wales) Ospreys	Cape Town Stadium
18:00	Try: Roos (10'); Simelane (58') de Villiers (70'); Con: Matthee (59'); Pen: Matthee (41', 44', 57')	Report	Try: Hardy (3', 29')	Attendance: 13 668; Referee: Peter Martin

10 October 2025	Scarlets (Wales)	0 – 34	(South Africa) Stormers (1 BP)	Parc y Scarlets, Llanelli
19:45	Cards: Plumtree (yellow card) 33'; Page (yellow card) 72'	Report	Try: Roos (11') de Villiers (40') v. Heerden (57'); Feinberg-Mngomezulu (65'); Khan (74'); Con: Feinberg-Mngomezulu (12', 41'); Willemse (58'); Pen: Feinberg-Mngomezulu (17'); Cards: Dixon (yellow card) 28'; Feinberg-Mngomezulu (yellow card) 53'

18 October 2025	Zebre Parma	13 – 31	Stormers (1 BP)	Stadio Sergio Lanfranchi, Parma
19:45	Try: Belloni, (20'); Con: da Re (21'); Pen: da Re (63', 67'); Cards: Nocero (yellow card) 59'	Report	Try: de Villiers (6'); Feinberg-Mngomezulu, (37', 46'); Gelant, (58'); Nel (80'); Con: Feinberg-Mngomezulu, (38', 58', 80'+1)	Referee: Andrew Brace

25 October 2025	Benetton (Italy)	16 – 31	(South Africa) Stormers	Stadio Comunale di Monigo, Treviso
17:30	Try: Lynagh (30' c); Con: Umaga (31'); Pen: Umaga (15', 18', 35')	Report	Try: Sandi (6' m); Matthee (48' c); Porthen (80' c); Con: Matthee (49', 81'); Pen: Matthee (20', 45', 53', 72')	Attendance: 4,903; Referee: Hollie Davidson (Scotland)

29 November 2025	(1 BP) Munster (Ireland)	21 – 27	(South Africa) Stormers	Thomond Park, Limerick
17:30	Try: Beirne (8' c); Hodnett (20' c); Crowley (27' c); Con: Crowley (3/3) (8', 20', 28'); Cards: Coombes (yellow card) 58' to 68'	Report	Try: A. Smith (58'); Maart (68'); Nel (72'); Con: Matthee (3/3) (59' c, 69' c, 72' c); Pen: Matthee (6', 12'); Cards: Evans (yellow card) 3' to 13'; Theunissen (yellow card) 20' to 30'	Attendance: 14,421; Referee: Andrea Piardi (Italy)

20 December 2025	(1 BP) Stormers (South Africa)	34 – 27	(South Africa) Lions (1 BP)	Cape Town Stadium
13:30	Try: Maart (27'c); Simelane (42'c) de Villiers (53'c); Roos (64'c); Con: Matthee (4/4) (28', 42', 54', 65'); Pen: Matthee (2/2) (38', 60')	Report	Try: Venter (1'c, 40'c); Mpeku (69'c); Con: CW Smith (3/3) (1',40',70'); Pen: CW Smith (2/2) (19', 57')	Attendance: 28,205; Referee: Hanru Van Rooyen

14 March 2026	Bulls (South Africa)	19 – 32	(South Africa) Stormers (1BP)	Loftus Versfeld Stadium, Pretoria
12:00	Try: Penalty Try (19); Burger (67'c); Arendse (79'm); Con: Pollard (1/2) 68'; Cards: Wiese (yellow card) 64' van Staden (yellow card) 66'		Try: Willemse (31'c); De Villiers (57'm); Penalty Try (66); Daymani (70'c); Con: Feinberg-Mngomezulu (2/3) 31', 70'; Pen: Feinberg-Mngomezulu (2/4) 40', 51'; Cards: A. Smith (yellow card) 14'; Dixon (yellow card) 19'	Attendance: 33,280; Referee: Marius van der Westhuizen (SARU)

3 January 2026	Stormers (South Africa)	13 – 8	(South Africa) Bulls (1 BP)	Cape Town Stadium
16:00	Try: Roos 39' m Mchunu 79' m Pen: Feinberg-Mngomezulu 35'	Report	Try: Pollard 31'; Pen: Pollard 44 ' Cards: le Roux (yellow card) 35'	Attendance: 53,682; Referee: Griffin Colby (South Africa)

24 January 2026	Stormers (South Africa)	19 – 30	(South Africa) Sharks (1 BP)	Cape Town Stadium
17:30	Try: Weillemse (2) 7' m, 27' c penalty try 78'; Con: Feinberg-Mngomezulu (1/2) 37'; Cards: Moerat (yellow card) 47'; Sandi (yellow card) 71''	Report	Try: Jenkins 5' c Williams 12' c Buthelezi 47' m Esterhuizen 73' m Con: Hendrikse (2/4) 6', 13; Pen: Hendrikse (2) 17', 68'; Cards: Tshituka (yellow card) 78'	Attendance: 52,087; Referee: Aimee Barrett-Theron (RSA)

31 January 2026	(1 BP) Sharks (South Africa)	36 – 24	(South Africa) Stormers	Kings Park Stadium, Durban
15:00	Try: Williams 12' c Hooker 25' c Esterhuizen 48' c Williams 53' c, 72'm Con: Hendrikse (4/5) 13', 26', 49', 53'; Pen: Hendrikse 69'	Report	Try: Reinach 1' m de Villiers 43' c Con: Feinberg-Mngomezulu (1/2) 44'; Pen: Feinberg-Mngomezulu (4) 16', 20', 39', 40+3'; Cards: de Villiers (yellow card) 9' van Heerden (yellow card) 49'	Attendance: 25,364; Referee: Christopher Allison

28 February 2026	Lions (South Africa)	24 – 10	(South Africa) Stormers	Ellis Park Stadium, Johannesburg
12:30	Try: Mahashe 22' c van Wyk 26' c Cronjé 45' c Con: Smith (3/3) 23', 26', 46'; Pen: Smith 58'; Cards: van Vuuren (red card) 69'; Qoma (yellow card) 66'	Report	Try: JD Schickerling 55' c Con: Feinberg-Mngomezulu 55'; Pen: Feinberg-Mngomezulu 43'	Attendance: 10,791; Referee: Chris Allison (South Africa)

22 March 2026	(1 BP) Stormers (South Africa)	29 – 21	(Wales) Dragons	Cape Town Stadium, Cape Town
15:00	Try: Feinberg-Mngomezulu (2) 9' c, 17' c Roos 49' c Simelane 59' m Con: Feinberg-Mngomezulu (3/4) 10', 18', 50'; Pen: Feinberg-Mngomezulu 43'		Try: Davies 25' c Young 53' c Dyer 72' c Con: O'Brien (3/3) 26', 54', 73'	Attendance: 15,079; Referee: Andrew Brace (Ireland)

28 March 2026	(1 BP) Stormers (South Africa)	33 – 14	(Scotland) Edinburgh	Cape Town Stadium
17:00	Try: Roos (2) 25' c, 68' c Zas 49' m Mchunu 63' c Fourie 80' c Con: Feinberg-Mngomezulu (4/5) 25', 63', 69', 81'	Report	Try: Lang 34' c Venter 58' c Con: Thompson (2) 35', 59'	Attendance: 21,487; Referee: Gianluca Gnecchi (Italy)

18 April 2026	Stormers (South Africa)	24 – 33	(Ireland) Connacht (1 BP)	Cape Town Stadium
13:45	Try: Roos 14' c Mchunu 47' c Feinberg-Mngomezulu 62' c Con: Feinberg-Mngomezulu (3/3) 14', 48', 63'; Pen: Feinberg-Mngomezulu 41'; Cards: Fourie (yellow card) 4'	Report	Try: Hurley-Langton 7' c Boyle 51' c Devine 64' m Murphy 70' c Naughton 78' c Con: Gilbert (3/4) 7', 71', 79'; Naughton 51'	Attendance: 13,903; Referee: Federico Vedovelli (Italy)

25 April 2026	(1 BP) Stormers (South Africa)	48 – 12	(Scotland) Glasgow Warriors	Cape Town Stadium
12:30 (rearranged)	Try: Mchunu (2) 9' c, 14' c Roos 29' c Nel 49' c Feinberg-Mngomezulu, 72 c Morabe, 78' c Con: Feinberg-Mngomezulu (6/6) 10', 15', 30', 49', 73', 77'; Pen: Feinberg-Mngomezulu 5', 43'; Cards: Reinach (yellow card) 37'	Report, 2, 3	Try: O Smith 25' m Hiddleston 38' c Con: Hastings (1/2) 38'; Cards: Dempsey (yellow card) 14'; Hastings (yellow card) 42'	Attendance: 23,740; Referee: Eoghan Cross (Ireland)

8 May 2026	(1 BP) Ulster (Ireland)	38 – 38	(South Africa) Stormers (1 BP)	Ravenhill Stadium, Belfast
19:45	Try: Kok (3) 4' c, 28' c, 69' m Z Ward 35' c Lowry 45' m O'Sullivan 75' c Con: Doak (4/6) 5', 30', 36', 77'; Cards: Henderson (red card) 9'; Doak (yellow card) 80'	Report	Try: Roos 6' c Feinberg-Mngomezulu (2) 14' c, 64' c Khan 48' c penalty try 80'; Con: Feinberg-Mngomezulu (4/4) 7', 15', 49', 64'; Pen: Feinberg-Mngomezulu 21'; Cards: Matthee (yellow card) 75'	Attendance: 9,782; Referee: Andrea Piardi (Italy)

15 May 2026	(1 BP) Cardiff (Wales)	22 – 16	(South Africa) Stormers (1 BP)	Cardiff Arms Park
19:45	Try: Beetham (2) 16' c, 49' m Bowen 20' m Lloyd 40' m Con: Lloyd (1/4) 17'; Cards: Belcher (yellow card) 4'; Hughes (yellow card) 80+1'	Report	Try: A Smith 7'; Con: Feinberg-Mngomezulu 8'; Pen: Feinberg-Mngomezulu (3) 30', 46', 80+2'; Cards: A Smith (yellow card) 38'	Attendance: 10,143; Referee: Andrew Brace (Ireland)

== Play-offs ==
The top eight teams in the regular season standings advance to the knockout stage, a single-elimination tournament culminating in a Grand Final to crown the overall champion.

Teams are seeded based on the regular season standings, with teams ranked 1–4 receiving home field advantage in the quarter-final, with 1 playing 8, 2 playing 7 etc. The top two teams in the standings are seeded so as not to meet until the Grand Final.

Home-field advantage for the semi-finals and Grand Final will be awarded to the highest-ranked team in each tie; the top two teams are therefore guaranteed home advantage until the final for as long as they remain in the tournament, and the top ranked team, Glasgow Warriors, in the standings will be awarded home advantage should they reach the Grand Final. In the build up to the final week of the regular season, it was reported that Glasgow Warriors may be forced to play a semi-final and final outside Scotland due to venue unavailability, although they would technically remain the home team. In the week of the quarter-final, it was announced they would, if they progressed, play their semi-final and Grand Final on home soil, at Murrayfield Stadium, Edinburgh.

Cardiff and Lions both made the play-offs for the first time. Stormers, Glasgow Warriors, Leinster, Munster and Bulls reached their fifth URC play-off phase from five seasons. Glasgow Warriors became the first non-Irish team to top the regular season table and take the number one seeding since they did so themselves in 2019.

Quarter-finals
1	(Scotland) Glasgow Warriors	33
8	(Ireland) Connacht	21
4	(South Africa) Bulls	45
5	(Ireland) Munster	14
3	(South Africa) Stormers	44
6	(Wales) Cardiff	21
2	(Ireland) Leinster	59
7	(South Africa) Lions	10

Semi-finals
1	(Scotland) Glasgow Warriors	21
4	(South Africa) Bulls	22
2	(Ireland) Leinster	20
3	(South Africa) Stormers	11

Final
2	(Ireland) Leinster	36
4	(South Africa) Bulls	7

Quarter-final

30 May 2026	Stormers (South Africa) (3)	44 – 21	(6) (Wales) Cardiff	DHL Stadium, Cape Town
15:30	Try: Venter 24' c Mchunu 29' c Zas 36' c Feinberg-Mngomezulu 52' m de Villiers 64' m Kotze 78' c Con: Feinberg-Mngomezulu (3/4) 25', 30', 37'; Jurie Matthee (1/2) 79'); Pen: Matthee (2)69', 80+1'	Report	Try: Winnett 19' c Basham 45' c Botham 60' c Con: Lloyd (3/3) 20', 46', 61'; Cards: Assiratti (yellow card) 32'; Sebastian (yellow card) 64'	Attendance: 30,595; Referee: Eoghan Cross (Ireland)

Semi-final

06 June 2026	Leinster (Ireland) (2)	v	(3) (South Africa) Stormers	Aviva Stadium, Dublin
17:30

== 2025–26 URC South African Shield ==
2025–26 United Rugby Championship Regional Shield tables
(South Africa) South African Shield
	Team	P	W	D	L	PF	PA	PD	TF	TA	TBP	LBP	Pts	Pos overall
1	(South Africa) Lions	6	4	0	2	168	173	–5	21	25	2	1	19	7
2	(South Africa) Sharks	6	3	0	3	143	153	–10	21	19	3	1	16	10
3	(South Africa) Stormers	6	3	0	3	132	144	–12	16	19	2	0	14	3
4	(South Africa) Bulls	6	2	0	4	165	138	+27	24	19	3	1	12	4
If teams are level at any stage, tiebreakers are applied in the following order: 1. number of matches won 2. the difference between points for and points against 3. the number of tries scored 4. the most points scored 5. the difference between tries for and tries against 6. the fewest red cards received 7. the fewest yellow cards received
Green background indicates teams currently leading the regional shield. Upon the conclusion of the regular season, these teams win their respective regional shields. (S) : URC Shield champion

== European Rugby Champions Cup ==
Stormers have been drawn in Pool 3 of the European Rugby Champions Cup. alongside fellow URC side Leinster (whom Stormers will not play in line with the competition's rules), Stormers will face Harlequins, Leicester Tigers, Bayonne and La Rochelle.

European Rugby Champions Cup Pool 3
Pos	Team	Pld	W	D	L	PF	PA	PD	TF	TA	TB	LB	Pts	Qualification
1	(Ireland) Leinster (3)	4	4	0	0	115	80	+35	16	10	2	0	18	Home Champions Cup round of 16
2	(England) Harlequins (6)	4	3	0	1	184	86	+98	26	14	3	0	15	Home Champions Cup round of 16
3	(South Africa) Stormers (9)	4	3	0	1	117	125	−8	15	19	2	0	14	Away Champions Cup round of 16
4	(England) Leicester Tigers (16)	4	1	0	3	118	115	+3	17	15	2	0	6	Away Champions Cup round of 16
5	(France) La Rochelle (11CC)	4	1	0	3	101	114	−13	15	15	1	1	6	Away Challenge Cup round of 16
6	(France) Bayonne	4	0	0	4	58	173	−115	8	24	0	0	0	

Source: EPCR
Rules for classification: Tiebreakers for teams tied on points: 1) Number of matches won; 2) Difference between points for and against; 3) Total number of points for; 4) Aggregate number of points scored in matches between tied teams; 5) Number of matches won excluding the first match, then the second and so on until the tie is settled.

5 December 2025	Bayonne (France)	17–26	(South Africa) Stormers	Stade Jean-Dauger, Bayonne
21:00	Try: Mori (16' m); Erbinartegaray (53' m); Paulos (61' c); Con: Spring (62'); Cards: Bosch (yellow card) 71' to f.t.' Fepulea'i (yellow card) 73' to f.t.'		Try: Khan (2' c) de Villiers (76' c); Con: Swart (3', 77'); Pen: Swart(23', 28', 31', 81'); Cards: Smith (red card) 48'; Zas (yellow card) 68' to 78'	Attendance: 14,576; Referee: Nika Amashukeli (Georgia)

13 December 2025	(1 BP) Stormers (South Africa)	42–21	(France) La Rochelle	Nelson Mandela Bay Stadium, Gqeberha
14:00	Try: Maart (2) 3' m, 53' c Zas 8' m Venter 46' m Gelant 57' c Theunissen 71' c Con: Feinberg-Mngomezulu (3/6) 54', 58', 72'; Pen: Feinberg-Mngomezulu (2/2) 30', 42'; Cards: Fouché (yellow card) 48'	Report	Try: Lespiaucq 26' c Sutidze 50' c Bollengier 67' c Con: Jurd (3/3) 27', 50', 68'	Attendance: 17,058; Referee: Luke Pearce (England)

11 January 2026	(1 BP) Harlequins (England)	61–10	(South Africa) Stormers	Twickenham Stoop, London
13:00	Try: Kenningham 6' c Murley 10' m Dombrandt 15' c Cunningham-South 25' c David (3) 29' c, 51' c, 58' c Carr 60' c Evans 80' c Con: Smith (8/9) 7', 16', 26', 30', 53', 59', 61', 80'	Report	Try: Khan 65' m Maart 72' m	Attendance: 10,315; Referee: Nika Amashukeli (Georgia)

17 January 2026	(1 BP) Stormers (South Africa)	39–26	(England) Leicester Tigers (1 BP)	DHL Stadium, Cape Town
16:15	Try: Roos 7' c Venter 15' m Zas 48' c Schickerling 66' c Khan 80+1' c Con: Feinberg-Mngomezulu (4/5) 7', 49', 67', 80+2'; Pen: Feinberg-Mngomezulu (1/1) 41'; Khan (1/1) 71'; Cards: Feinberg-Mngomezulu (yellow card) 62'	Report	Try: Pearson 23' c Wand 26' c Blamire 44' c Manz 72' m Con: Searle (3/4) 23', 26', 45'; Cards: Hurd (yellow card) 5'	Attendance: 24,893; Referee: Jeremy Rozier (France)

Round of 16

4 April 2026	Toulon (France) (7)	28–27	(10) (South Africa) Stormers	Stade Mayol, Toulon
16:00	Try: White 8' c Dréan 29' c Ferté 57' c Tuicuvu 65' c Con: Domon (1/1) 9'; Albornoz (3/3) 30', 58', 66'; Cards: Halagahu (yellow card) 72'; Nonu (yellow card) 79'	Report	Try: A. Smith 23' c Roos 53' c Khan 77' c Con: Matthee (1/1) 24'; Feinberg-Mngomezulu (2/2) 54', 77'; Pen: Matthee (2/2) 19', 34'	Attendance: 14,171; Referee: Christophe Ridley (England)

== See also ==
2025-26 Sharks Season
2025–26 Lions season
2025–26 Bulls season
