= Robyn de Groot =

South African cyclist (born 1982)

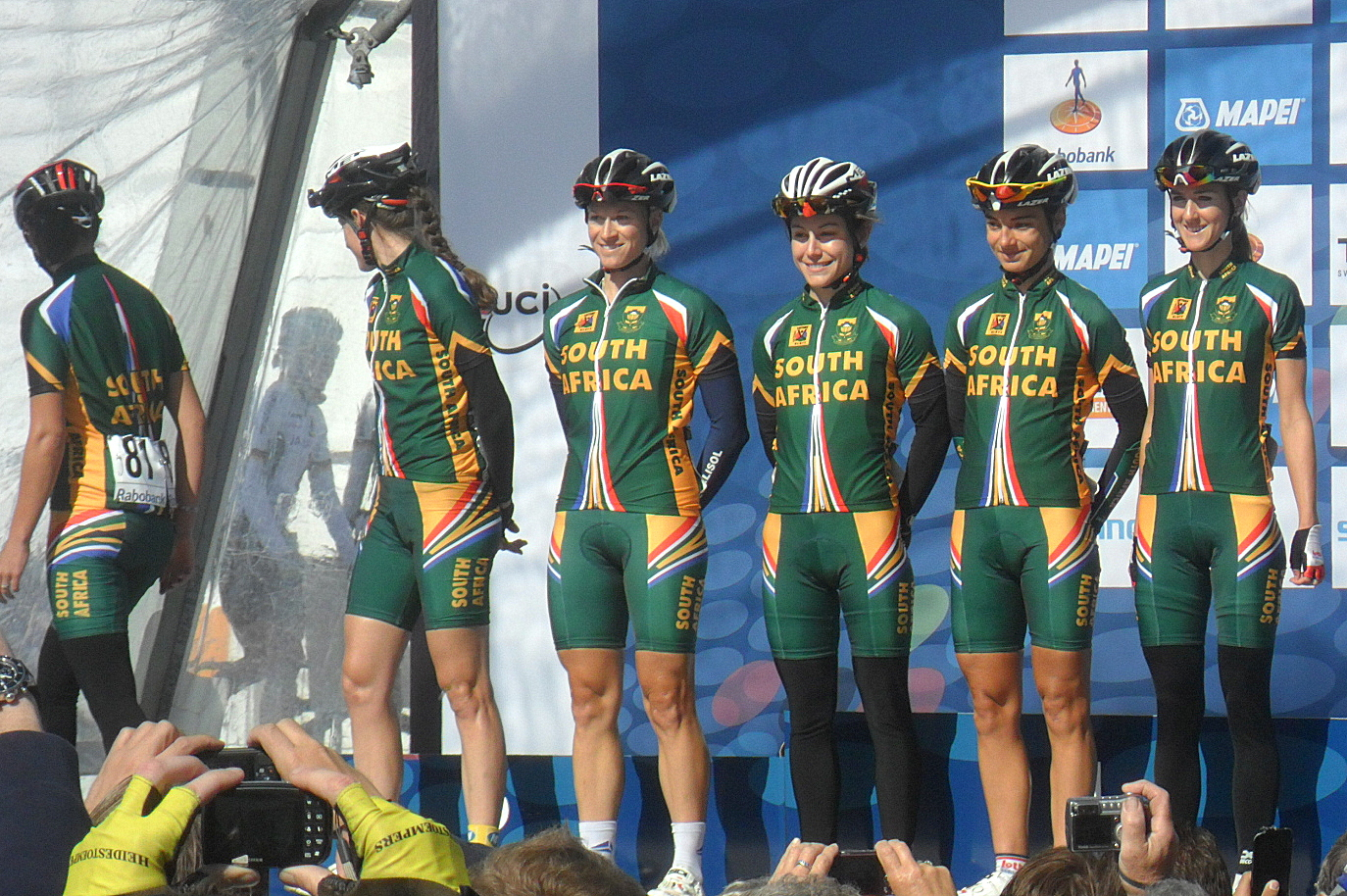
Robyn de Groot at the 2012 UCI Road World Championships

Robyn de Groot (born 26 December 1982) is a South African cyclist. She cycled professionally on the road from 2006 to 2012. Representing South Africa for 6 consecutive years, she represented South Africa at 4 World Championships, the 2010 Commonwealth Games in Delhi, India and the 2012 London Summer Olympics. She was unable to finish within the time limit due to an early crash and mechanical problems.

In 2012, she retired from professional road cycling. She returned to her profession in Biokinetics. Robyn took up mountain biking in 2013, primarily as a hobby, it soon became another avenue she excelled at. She won the MTN National marathon mountain bike series proving the consistency of her results. Robyn went on to win the SA marathon title on her first attempt, and was selected to represent her country at the Marathon world championships in Austria, where she finished 19th. In 2014 Robyn successfully defended her National XCM title for the 2nd consecutive year, and finished 6th at World Championships held in Pietermaritzburg, South Africa.

In March, 2017, De Groot, riding with German Sabine Spitz, finished the Absa Cape Epic in third position after a string of setbacks – mainly the German’s two major crashes – put paid to the pre-race favourites’ chances. It was de Groot’s third Cape Epic. She had finished 2nd in 2015 and as an individual finisher in 2016 when her partner pulled out of the race due to illness.

In September 2019, De Groot placed third in the elite women’s race at the UCI Mountain Bike Marathon World Championships held in Grächen, Switzerland

== Early life ==
Born and grew up in Johannesburg, South Africa. She attended Panorama Primary, followed by Northliff High School where she matriculated in 2000. Robyn studied Sport psychology at the University of Johannesburg, and went on to do her honors in Biokinetics at the University of Cape Town (2004). Qualification: B.A Sport Psychology B.S.c (Med)(Hons) Exercise Science(Biokinetics)

== Palmarès ==
2006

2007

2008 - world Championships. Varese. Italy

2009

2010 - Commonwealth Games. Delhi, India - world championships. Melbourne, Australia

2011 - World Championships. Copenhagen, Denmark

2012 - London Olympian (Road) - World Championships. Netherlands

2013 - National XCM champion : SA - World championships. Brixental, Austria. 19th

2014 - National XCM Champion : South Africa - World Championships. Pietermaritzburg, South Africa. 6th

2017 - 3rd Absa Cape Epic Women's category

2019 - Placed 3rd at UCI Mountain Bike Marathon World Championships, Switzerland

UCI teams - road cycling
- MTN ladies continental cycling team 2010 - Lotto Honda ladies team 2011 - Lotto-Belisol 2012

Current sponsor - Mountain Biking (2014) - Title Sponsors: Biogen Toyota - Co-sponsors : Trek, Craft, Bontrager, Cyclelab, Nike Vision
