= Jonathan Roxmouth =

South African musical theater actor and singer (born 1987)

- Born: 25 February 1987 (age 39); Randburg, South Africa
- Occupations: Actor; singer; musician
- Years active: 2006 - present
- Website: jonathanroxmouth.com

Jonathan Roxmouth (born 25 February 1987) is a South African musical theater actor and singer, best known for his role as the Phantom in several productions of The Phantom of the Opera, including the world tour. He also played Che in the international tour of Evita.

== Early life ==
Roxmouth was born in Randburg, South Africa. He attended Northcliff High School, where he participated in annual theater productions. While in high school, Roxmouth also acted in musicals at the Natal Playhouse. Growing up, he participated in the Randburg Eisteddfod and earned diplomas in creative verse, light music/jazz, and voice.

== Career ==
He began his professional career in 2006, playing Vince Fontaine/Teen Angel in the Barnyard Theatre Group's production of Grease, and has been acting in stage and musical productions since.

== Stage roles ==
Duration	Production	Role	Theatre	Awards
2006	Grease	Vince Fontaine/Teen Angel	Barnyard Theatre	
2007	The Buddy Holly Story	Buddy	Barnyard Theatre	
2007-2008	The King and I	Lun Tha	Packed House Productions	
2006-2008	Rock Me, Amadeus	Wolfgang Amadeus Mozart	Barnyard Theatre	
2008	The Barnyard Theatre with Matthew Stewardson	Lackey to Matthew Stewardson	Barnyard Theatre	
2008	A Handful of Keys	Two of four hands	Award Productions	Naledi Nomination for Best Performance in a Breakthrough Role; Fleur Du Cap Award Nomination for Best Performance in a Cabaret or Revue
2008-2009	Beauty and the Beast	Gaston	Hazel Feldman/Pieter Toerien Productions	Naledi Award for Best Performance in a Musical; Best Comedy Performance shared with Sibu Radebe; Fleur Du Cap for Best Performance in a Musical
2009	A Handful of Keys	One of two madmen	Award Productions	
2010	Grease	Danny Zuko	Pieter Toerien Productions	Naledi Award Nomination for Best Performance in a Musical
2009-2011	Cats	Munkustrap	Pieter Toerien Productions	
2011	Jesus Christ Superstar	Judas Iscariot	Pieter Toerien Productions	Fleur du Cap for the best supporting interpretation
2011, 2012	Topsy-Turvy	Various characters	Essential Vibes, Montecasino Theatre Productions	
2011-2012	The Phantom of the Opera	The Phantom	Pieter Toerien Productions	Fleur du Cap Award for Best Performance in a Musical; Artes Legends Award; Naledi Award for Best Performance in a Musical (Male)
2011-2012	The Phantom of the Opera	The Phantom	Lunchbox Theatrical Productions, Manila, Philippines	Broadway World Philippines Award for Best Actor (musical)
2012-2013	Noël and Gertie	Noël Coward	Pieter Toerien Productions	Fleur du Cap nomination; Naledi Award nomination for Best Performance in a Musical
2013	A Handful of Keys	Various	Pieter Toerien Main Theatre, Johannesburg; York Theatre, New York City; Elgar Room at the Royal Albert Hall, London; Madinat Theatre, Dubai	
2013	Hats Off!		Pieter Toerien Productions	Fleur du Cap Nomination for Best Performance in a Revue
2014	Sunset Boulevard	Joe Gillis	Pieter Toerien Productions	
2015	West Side Story	Tony	Artscape Theatre Centre, Cape Town	Fleur du Cap Nomination for Best Performance in a Musical
2015	From The Footlights	Various	Teatro, Monte Casino	
2015	Sweeney Todd: The Demon Barber of Fleet Street	Sweeney Todd	Pieter Toerien Productions	Naledi Award for Best Performance in a Musical (Male)
2016	Joseph and the Amazing Technicolour Dreamcoat	Pharaoh	Pieter Torien Productions	
2017	West Side Story	Tony	Joburg Theatre	
2017-2018	Evita	Che	International Tour	
2018	Great Balls of Fire	Jerry Lee Lewis	Teatro, Monte Casino	
2018	Chicago	Billy Flynn	World Tour	
2019-20, 2024-	The Phantom of the Opera	The Phantom	World Tour	
2025	Chicago	Billy Flynn	Artscape Theatre Centre, Cape Town	
