= Cheswill Jooste =

South African rugby union player

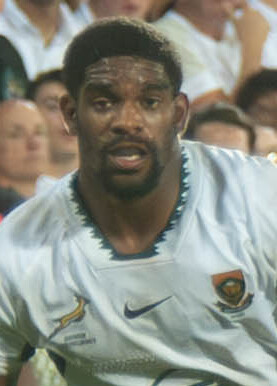
- Born: 5 September 2006 (age 20) Vredenburg, South Africa
- Height: 175 cm (5 ft 9 in)
- Weight: 75 kg (165 lb; 11 st 11 lb)
- School: Hoërskool Noordheuwel

Rugby union career
- Position: Wing
- Current team: Bulls / Blue Bulls
Senior career
Years	Team	Apps	(Points)
2025–	Blue Bulls		
2025–	Bulls	4	(15)
- Correct as of 1 March 2026
International career
Years	Team	Apps	(Points)
2025	South Africa U20	8	(15)
- Correct as of 1 March 2026

Cheswill Jooste (born 5 September 2006) is a South African rugby union player, who plays for the Bulls and Blue Bulls. His preferred position is wing.

== Early career ==
Jooste is from Vredenburg, South Africa and attended Hoërskool Noordheuwel. His performances earned him selection for the Golden Lions side at Craven Week in 2023 and 2024, earning him selection for the South Africa Schools side in 2023 and 2024 also. Following this, he joined up with the Bulls academy and earned selection for the South Africa U20 side in 2025.

== Professional career ==
Jooste was named in the Blue Bulls squad for the 2025 Currie Cup Premier Division. He would debut for the full Bulls side in the opening round of the 2025–26 United Rugby Championship, featuring in the match against the Ospreys where he scored two tries. He would then score again on his next start against Pau in the 2025–26 European Rugby Champions Cup.

In February 2026, Jooste was named in the first alignment camp of 2026 for the South Africa national side.
