= Izan Esterhuizen =

South African rugby union player

- Born: 8 May 2001 (age 25) South Africa
- Height: 191 cm (6 ft 3 in)
- Weight: 112 kg (247 lb; 17 st 9 lb)
- School: Hoërskool Monument

Rugby union career
- Position: Flanker / Number 8
- Current team: Lions / Golden Lions
Senior career
Years	Team	Apps	(Points)
2023–	Lions	16	(0)
2022–	Golden Lions	4	(0)
- Correct as of 8 September 2025

Izan Esterhuizen (born 8 May 2001) is a South African rugby union player, who plays for the Lions and Golden Lions. His preferred position is Flanker or Number 8.

== Early career ==
Esterhuizen attended Hoërskool Monument where he captained the school side and earned selection for SA Schools A. He was named in the South Africa U20 squad for the 2021 U20 International series.

== Professional career ==
Esterhuizen made his professional debut for the Golden Lions in the 2022 Currie Cup Premier Division, and has continued to represent them since. He made his debut for the Lions in December 2023, and has gone on to make 14 appearances for the side.
