= Rhynardt Rijnsburger =

South African rugby union player

- Born: 11 February 2001 (age 25) South Africa
- Height: 188 cm (6 ft 2 in)
- Weight: 116 kg (256 lb; 18 st 4 lb)
- School: Paarl Boys' High School
- University: Stellenbosch University

Rugby union career
- Position: Prop
- Current team: Golden Lions / Lions
Youth career
- Western Province
Senior career
Years	Team	Apps	(Points)
2023–	Lions	8	(5)
2023–	Golden Lions	8	(0)
- Correct as of 29 October 2023

Rhynardt Rijnsburger (born 11 February 2001) is a former South African rugby union player, who played for the Lions in the United Rugby Championship and the Golden Lions in the Currie Cup. His preferred position was prop.

== Early career ==
Rijnsburger attended Paarl Boys' High School, before attending Stellenbosch University. He represented Western Province at youth level, playing for their U21 side, having previously committed to moving overseas to France, a move that was scuppered by the COVID-19 pandemic.

== Professional career ==
Rijnsburger was called into the Lions squad for the 2022–23 EPCR Challenge Cup where he debuted against Stade Français Paris. He would go on to make a further 2 appearances in the competition, followed by another 5 in the United Rugby Championship. He would also make 8 appearances in the 2023 Currie Cup Premier Division for the Golden Lions. On 27 January 2024 the Lions announced that for health reasons, at age 22, Reynardt was forced to retire from all forms of rugby.
