= Northcliff High School =

Location
- Mountain View Drive, Blackheath; Johannesburg, Gauteng; South Africa; 26°07′48″S 27°57′52″E

Information
- School type: Public
- Motto: Nihl Tam Altum (Nothing so high)
- Established: 1969; 57 years ago
- School district: District 9
- Principal: Mr. Andrew Wilkins
- Teaching staff: 56
- Grades: 8–12
- Gender: Boys & Girls
- Age: 14 to 18
- Average class size: 22-30
- Schedule: 07:30 - 14:00
- Colours: Blue; Navy; White; Red
- Rivals: Bryanston High School; Rand Park High School
- Accreditation: Gauteng Department of Education

Northcliff High School, commonly known as Northcliff High, is a public English medium co-educational high school located in the suburb of Blackheath in Johannesburg in the Gauteng province of South Africa. It is one of the top and most academic schools in Gauteng. The high school was established in 1969.

== Location ==
The school is located on Mountain View Drive, at the bottom of Northcliff Hill.

== Sporting ==
Northcliff High has won the A-League Inter-High Athletics competition for 25 consecutive years, from 1997 - 2023 [Meeting did not talk place in 2020/1 due to Covid].

In 2015, construction of an astroturf hockey field started. At the time, the school was the only government school in the area to own one.

A bear was the First Rugby team mascot in 1973. It featured in every First Rugby team photo until 1987. In 2018 the mascot was returned to the school by the 1990 First Rugby team Captain.

Northcliff won the A-league inter-high gala 24 times over the years.

== Controversy ==
In June 2017, Northcliff High was embroiled in a religious sensitivity scandal after it required its female Muslim students to carry concession cards in order to wear a head scarf to school. It was claimed that this was to make sure that the uniform rules were upheld. This issue was remedied and the school prides itself on being fully inclusive and accepting of all religions.

=== Transformation ===
According to a 2017 Sunday Times investigative report, Northcliff was named as Gauteng's least representative school staff-wise, with its academic staff consisting of 96% white staff members. The figures for Northcliff High School were according to photos on the school's website as the school declined to reveal its numbers to the press.

== Notable alumni ==
- Shane Burger - Scotland international cricket coach
- Connell Cruise - Singer-songwriter
- Clive Eksteen - South African international cricket player
- Neville Godwin - Professional tennis player and coach
- Kelly-Ann Johnson - Irish international netball player
- Darrien Landsberg - Professional Rugby Player
- Traverse Le Goff - Member of Parliament
- Kent Main - Cyclist
- Kristen Paton - South African international field hockey player
- Sean Roberts - Professional football player
- Jonathan Roxmouth - Stage actor
- Max Sorensen - Irish international cricket player
- Byron Talbot - Professional tennis player and Wimbledon doubles contestant
- Emmanuel Tshituka - Professional Rugby Player
- Vincent Tshituka - Professional Rugby Player
- Sharne Wehmeyer - South African international field hockey player
