= Hoërskool Noordheuwel =

Highschool in Gauteng, South Africa

Location
- Bell Street, Noordheuwel; Krugersdorp, Gauteng; South Africa
- Coordinates: 26.0973878906137°S 27.80804399781499°E

Information
- Other name: Nories
- School type: Public & Boarding
- Motto: Krag deur Kennis
- Religious affiliation: Christianity
- Established: 1981; 45 years ago
- Principal: Dawie Kriel
- Staff: 120 full-time
- Grades: 8 to 12
- Gender: Boys & Girls
- Age: 14 to 18
- Enrollment: 2,000 pupils
- Average class size: 25
- Language: Afrikaans
- Schedule: 07:15 - 14:00
- Campus: Urban Campus
- Colours: Blue; Navy; White
- Nickname: Nories
- Rivals: Hoërskool Monument
- Accreditation: Gauteng Department of Education
- School fees: R38,290 (tuition)
- Alumni: Old Nories

Hoërskool Noordheuwel is an Afrikaans medium co-educational high school located in the upscale neighborhood of Noordheuwel in Johannesburg in the Gauteng province of South Africa. It is one of the most expensive Afrikaans medium schools, the fee per child amounting to R 38 290 per annum (as of 2023). The National Department of Education named the school as the top academic school in Gauteng West and under the top 20 schools in the country.

In 2025, the Gauteng Provincial Education Department announced that the school was among the top three schools with students achieving Bachelor's degree acceptance.

The school is considered one of the top athletic and sports schools in South Africa. In 2024, the school was crowned as the NWU Sport School of the year for the second consecutive year. Noordheuwel also consistently ranks amongst the country's top 3 athletic schools in the South African PUKKE athletics rankings.

The cural activities offered by the school include choir, debate, public speaking, Miss/Mr Norie, orators, revue, and a community outreach program. The school also offers sports facilities for the following sports: athletics, golf, hockey, cricket (male and female), cross country, netball, rugby, chess, mountain biking, tennis, scuba diving and fishing.

== History ==
Hoërskool Noordheuwel was established in 1981 as an Afrikaans medium secondary school. Current student enrollment is in excess of 2000 pupils.

== Sports ==
The following sports are offered at the school:

- Athletics
- Chess
- Cricket (male and female)
- Cross country
- Equestrian
- Golf (male and female)
- Hockey (male and female)
- Mountain biking
- Netball (girls)
- Rugby (boys)
- Squash
- Swimming
- Table tennis
- Tennis
