= Embrose Papier =

South African rugby union player

- Full name: Embrose Cheldon Papier
- Born: 25 April 1997 (age 29) Clanwilliam, Western Cape, South Africa
- Height: 1.71 m (5 ft 7 1/2 in)
- Weight: 80 kg (12 st 8 lb; 176 lb)
- School: Hoërskool Garsfontein
- University: University of Pretoria

Rugby union career
- Position: Scrum-half
- Current team: Bulls / Blue Bulls
Youth career
- 2010: Boland Cavaliers
- 2013–2018: Blue Bulls
Senior career
Years	Team	Apps	(Points)
2018–present	Bulls	100	(30)
2018–2019	Blue Bulls XV	4	(15)
2018–present	Blue Bulls	15	(20)
2019–2020	Sale Sharks	11	(0)
- Correct as of 15 February 2025
International career
Years	Team	Apps	(Points)
2014–2015	South Africa U18	6	(15)
2016–2017	South Africa U20	6	(10)
2018-present	South Africa	11	(5)
- Correct as of 27 September 2026
Medal record
Boy's rugby sevens
Representing South Africa
Commonwealth Youth Games
Gold medal – first place	2015 Apia	Team competition

Embrose Cheldon Papier (born 25 April 1997) is a South African professional rugby union player for the Bulls in the United Rugby Championship and the Blue Bulls in the Currie Cup. His regular position is scrum-half.

== Career ==
=== 2010–2015: Schoolboy rugby ===
Papier was born in Clanwilliam in the Western Cape. As early as primary school level, he earned provincial colours by representing the Boland Cavaliers at the 2010 Under-13 Craven Week tournament held in Graaff-Reinet.

In 2011, he enrolled at Hoërskool Swartland, which is the Alma mater of current Springbok and 2019 World Rugby player of the Year, Pieter-Steph Du Toit. In 2013, he then moved to Pretoria, where he enrolled at Hoërskool Garsfontein. In 2013, he represented the Blue Bulls at the Under-16 Grant Khomo Week held in Vanderbijlpark, starting all three of their matches and scoring a try in their match against Eastern Province.

In 2014, despite still being in the Under-17 age bracket, he was included in the Blue Bulls squad for the Under-18 Craven Week, South Africa's premier rugby union tournament at high school level. He started all three matches at the tournament held in Middelburg, scoring a try in their 36–15 victory over KwaZulu-Natal. After the tournament, he was included in a South Africa Schools team that hosted the Under-18 International Series against their counterparts from France, Wales and England. Papier played off the bench in their 28–13 victory over France in their opening match, but was promoted to the starting line-up for their second match against Wales, scoring a try in their 40–15 victory. He was again used as a replacement for their final match against England, but could not prevent South Africa suffering a 22–30 defeat.

Papier had a similar season in 2015; he started all three of the Blue Bulls' matches at the Craven Week in Stellenbosch, scoring a try in their 40–12 victory over his home province Boland. He was once again included in the South Africa Schools squad, this time starting all three of their matches and also being named the vice-captain of the team. He scored a try in their 42–11 victory over Wales, and – after a 12–5 victory over France in their second match – scored another in their 23–16 win over England to avenge their 2014 defeat.

=== 2016–2018: Youth rugby ===
After high school, Papier joined the Blue Bulls' academy for the 2016 season. Despite not being included in an initial South Africa Under-20 training squad, or a reduced provisional squad named a week later, Papier was included in the final South Africa Under-20 squad for the 2016 World Rugby Under 20 Championship tournament to be held in Manchester in England. He started their opening match in Pool C of the tournament on the bench, appearing for the final eight minutes as South Africa came from behind to beat Japan 59–19. He did not feature in their second pool match, a 13–19 defeat to Argentina, but started their final match, scoring South Africa's first try in the match as they bounced back to secure a 40-31 bonus-point victory over France. The result meant South Africa secured a semi-final place as the best runner-up in the competition, but Papier suffered an ankle injury during a training session, which ended his involvement in the tournament. South Africa faced three-time champions England in their semi-final match, but the hosts proved too strong for them, knocking them out of the competition with a 39–17 victory, and they also lost the third-place play-off match against Argentina, as the South American side beat South Africa for the second time in the tournament, convincingly winning 49–19 to condemn South Africa to fourth place in the competition.

Papier recovered from his injury towards the end of the 2016 Under-19 Provincial Championship, starting the Blue Bulls' final two matches of the regular season. He scored a try in the first of those, a 62–7 victory over Leopards U19, before he helped the Blue Bulls secure second place on the log with a 50–30 victory over Western Province U19. He also started their semi-final match against Golden Lions U19, but a 34–24 victory for the team from Johannesburg ended the Blue Bulls' participation in the competition.

In November 2016, Papier was named in the Bulls Super Rugby team's extended training squad during the team's preparations for the 2017 Super Rugby season.

=== 2019-2020: Sale Sharks ===
In September 2019, Papier joined Premiership rugby union side Sale Sharks on a three-month loan deal as Rugby World Cup cover for compatriot Faf de Klerk.

== Honours ==
- Super Rugby Unlocked winner 2020
- Currie Cup winner 2020–21
- United Rugby Championship runner-up 2021-22
- Vodacom Bulls Currie Cup Player of the Year 2023

== Statistics ==
=== Test match record ===
As of 11 July 2026

Opponent	P	W	D	L	Try	Pts	%Won
Argentina	1	1	0	0	0	0	100
England	2	0	0	2	0	0	0
New Zealand	1	0	0	1	0	0	0
Scotland	2	2	0	0	1	5	100
Wales	2	0	0	2	0	0	0
Total	8	3	0	5	1	5	37.5

=== International tries ===
As of 11 July 2026

Try	Opposing team	Location	Venue	Competition	Date	Result	Score
1	Scotland	Pretoria, South Africa	Loftus Versfeld Stadium	2026 Nations Championship	11 July 2025	Win	42–28
