= Darrien Landsberg =

Zimbabwean rugby union player (born 1998)

- Full name: Darrien-Lane Landsberg
- Born: 26 July 1998 (age 28) Zimbabwe
- Height: 1.99 m (6 ft 6 1/2 in)
- Weight: 111 kg (245 lb)
- School: Northcliff High School

Rugby union career
- Position: Lock
- Current team: Lions / Golden Lions
Senior career
Years	Team	Apps	(Points)
2018–2019	Golden Lions XV	9	(5)
2020–2022	Pumas	20	(0)
2022–2026	Lions	57	(5)
2023–2026	Golden Lions	27	(10)
- Correct as of 26 October 2026

Darrien Landsberg (born 26 July 1998) is a Zimbabwean rugby union player for the Lions in the United Rugby Championship. His regular position is lock. He was born in Zimbabwe, but he moved to Johannesburg as a child. He was approached by the Zimbabwe national rugby union team in 2024, however he decided to decline the opportunity, stating that he aims to one day play for the Springboks.

== Club career ==
=== Pumas ===
He joined the Pumas ahead of the newly formed Super Rugby Unlocked competition in October 2020. Landsberg made his debut in Round 1 of Super Rugby Unlocked against the Cheetahs. He was a part of the team that won the Currie Cup in 2022.

=== Lions ===
Landsberg was brought up through the Lions system, playing for them throughout the age-grade levels. He made his debut for the Lions starting as an openside flanker against the Scarlets. His first four games for the Lions were as a flanker before he fully transitioned to playing as a lock. In the 2022-23 URC season he played 9 games, including 4 from the Challenge Cup, starting in 7 of them. In the next season he played 13 games and cemented himself as one of the first-choice locks, impressing with his line-out capabilities. In the 2024-25 season he played in almost every game for the Lions, except for when he was injured for 4 months in the beginning of the season
