= Ruan Venter (rugby union, born 2002) =

South African rugby union player

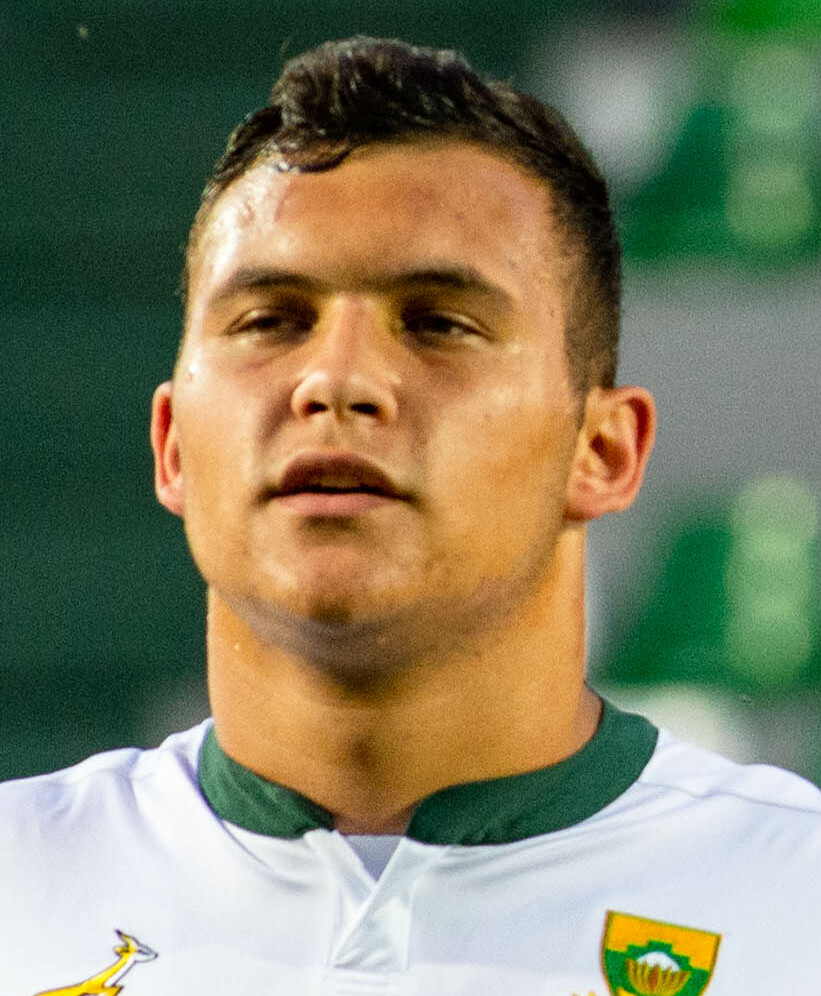
- Venter in 2022
- Full name: Ruan Venter
- Born: 29 November 2002 (age 23) Northern Cape, South Africa
- Height: 1.98 m (6 ft 6 in)
- Weight: 118 kg (260 lb)
- School: Sutherland High School

Rugby union career
- Position: Lock / Flanker
- Current team: Lions / Golden Lions
Senior career
Years	Team	Apps	(Points)
2022–	Golden Lions	19	(35)
2022–	Lions	68	(80)
- Correct as of 29 April 2026
International career
Years	Team	Apps	(Points)
2021–2022	South Africa Under-20	4	(10)
2024–	South Africa	1	(0)
- Correct as of 16 October 2024

Ruan Venter (born 29 November 2002) is a South African rugby union player for the Golden Lions in the Currie Cup. His regular position is flank.

Venter was named in the Golden Lions side for the 2022 Currie Cup Premier Division. He made his Currie Cup debut for the Golden Lions against the Western Province in Round 1 of the 2022 Currie Cup Premier Division.
