= Bronson Mills =

South African rugby union player

- Born: 7 August 2003 (age 23) South Africa
- Height: 185 cm (6 ft 1 in)
- Weight: 95 kg (209 lb; 14 st 13 lb)
- School: King Edward VII School

Rugby union career
- Position: Centre
- Current team: Lions / Golden Lions
Senior career
Years	Team	Apps	(Points)
2023–	Golden Lions	5	(25)
2025–	Lions	19	(10)
- Correct as of 3 November 2026

Bronson Mills (born 7 August 2003) is a South African rugby union player, who plays for the Lions and Golden Lions. His preferred position is centre.

== Early career ==
Mills attended King Edward VII School where he played for the first XV, captaining the side in 2021, and was a teammate of fellow Lions player Kelly Mpeku. In November 2025, he appeared in court for an alleged assault in Cape Town.

== Professional career ==
Mills represented the Lions in junior rugby, representing their Grant Khomo side in 2019. He made his Currie Cup debut for the Golden Lions in 2023, before representing the side again in 2024 and 2025. He made his debut for the Lions during the 2024–25 United Rugby Championship against Connacht.

== Legal issues ==
In October 2025, Mills was accused of assaulting a student at a house gathering in Cape Town.

He handed himself over to police and made his first court appearance on 5 November 2025. In March 2026 he appeared in the Wynberg Magistrate's Court on an assault charge, and the case was postponed to 15 April 2026 after his legal team requested time to make representations for the case to be withdrawn or for diversion. He continued to play for the Lions in the United Rugby Championship during the proceedings.
