= Etienne Oosthuizen (rugby union, born 1992) =

South African rugby union player

- Born: 22 December 1992 (age 33) Rustenburg, South Africa
- Height: 1.98 m (6 ft 6 in)
- Weight: 120 kg (18 st 13 lb; 265 lb)
- School: Bergsig Academy

Rugby union career
- Position: Lock / Flanker
- Current team: Lyon
Youth career
- 2008–2010: Leopards
- 2011–2012: Golden Lions
Senior career
Years	Team	Apps	(Points)
2012	Golden Lions XV	3	(5)
2012	Golden Lions	3	(0)
2012	Lions	3	(0)
2013	Brumbies	3	(0)
2014–2017	Sharks	53	(5)
2014–2016	Sharks (Currie Cup)	29	(15)
2015–2017	Sharks XV	3	(5)
2017–2020	Lyon	69	(20)
2023–	Lions	34	(15)
2024–	Golden Lions	5	(0)
- Correct as of 3 November 2026

Etienne Oosthuizen (born 22 December 1992) is a South African rugby union footballer. His regular playing position is either lock or flanker. He represents the Lions in the URC and in the EPCR Challenge Cup.

In September 2012, he signed a contract to join the Brumbies on a two-year deal. However, he was released from his contract after just one year and returned to South Africa to join the Sharks on a two-year contract.

In 2023, Oosthuizen signed a two-year contract with the Johannesburg-based Lions, 11 years after starting his career at the same union.
