= Kelly Mpeku =

South African rugby union player

- Born: 28 November 2003 (age 22) South Africa
- Height: 188 cm (6 ft 2 in)
- Weight: 88 kg (194 lb; 13 st 12 lb)
- School: King Edward VII School

Rugby union career
- Position: Wing
- Current team: Lions / Golden Lions
Senior career
Years	Team	Apps	(Points)
2024–	Golden Lions	19	(10)
2024–	Lions	22	(35)
- Correct as of 3 November 2026

Kelly Mpeku (born 28 November 2003) is a South African rugby union player, who plays for the Lions and Golden Lions. His preferred position is wing.

== Early career ==
Mpeku attended King Edward VII School where he played for the first XV and was a teammate of fellow Lions player Bronson Mills.

== Professional career ==
Mpeku represented the Lions in junior rugby, representing their Grant Khomo side in 2019. He made his Currie Cup debut for the Golden Lions in 2024, playing in the final. He also represented the side in 2025, again playing in the final, before debuting for the Lions in the 2024–25 EPCR Challenge Cup.
