= 2008–09 Munster Rugby season =

- Ground(s): Thomond Park (Capacity: 25,600); Musgrave Park (Capacity: 8,500)
- CEO: Garrett Fitzgerald
- Coach: Tony McGahan
- Captain: Paul O'Connell
- League: Celtic League
- 2008–09: 1st, Champions

The 2008–09 Munster Rugby season was Munster's eighth season competing in the Celtic League, alongside which they also competed in the Heineken Cup. It was Tony McGahan's first season as Director of Rugby.

== 2008–09 squad ==
Note: Flags indicate national union under World Rugby eligibility rules. Players may hold more than one non-World Rugby nationality.

Player	Position	Union
Denis Fogarty	Hooker	Ireland
Jerry Flannery	Hooker	Ireland
Frankie Sheahan	Hooker	Ireland
Tony Buckley	Prop	Ireland
John Hayes	Prop	Ireland
Marcus Horan	Prop	Ireland
Darragh Hurley	Prop	Ireland
Federico Pucciariello	Prop	Italy
Tim Ryan	Prop	Ireland
Billy Holland	Lock	Ireland
Mark Melbourne	Lock	Ireland
Donncha O'Callaghan	Lock	Ireland
Paul O'Connell (c)	Lock	Ireland
Mick O'Driscoll	Lock	Ireland
Donnacha Ryan	Lock	Ireland
James Coughlan	Back row	Ireland
Denis Leamy	Back row	Ireland
Tommy O'Donnell	Back row	Ireland
John O'Sullivan	Back row	Ireland
Alan Quinlan	Back row	Ireland
Niall Ronan	Back row	Ireland
David Wallace	Back row	Ireland
Nick Williams	Back row	New Zealand

Player	Position	Union
Gerry Hurley	Scrum-half	Ireland
Tomás O'Leary	Scrum-half	Ireland
Mike Prendergast	Scrum-half	Ireland
Peter Stringer	Scrum-half	Ireland
Duncan Williams	Scrum-half	Ireland
Jeremy Manning	Fly-half	Ireland
Ronan O'Gara	Fly-half	Ireland
Paul Warwick	Fly-half	Australia
Tom Gleeson	Centre	Ireland
Kieran Lewis	Centre	Ireland
Lifeimi Mafi	Centre	New Zealand
Barry Murphy	Centre	Ireland
Rua Tipoki	Centre	New Zealand
Ian Dowling	Wing	Ireland
Keith Earls	Wing	Ireland
Anthony Horgan	Wing	Ireland
Doug Howlett	Wing	New Zealand
Ciarán O'Boyle	Wing	Ireland
Denis Hurley	Fullback	Ireland

== Pre-season ==
23 August 2008

United States XV	22–46	(Ireland) Munster
	Report

Rentschler Field
Attendance: 8,350

29 August 2008

Munster (Ireland)	35–14	(England) London Irish
	Report

Musgrave Park

18 November 2008
19:30

Munster (Ireland)	16–18	New Zealand
	Report

Thomond Park
Attendance: 26,000
Referee: Romain Poite

== 2008–09 Celtic League ==
	Team	Pld	W	D	L	PF	PA	PD	TF	TA	Try bonus	Losing bonus	Pts
1	(Ireland) Munster	18	14	0	4	405	257	+148	49	23	6	1	63
2	(Scotland) Edinburgh	18	11	0	7	416	296	+120	40	30	6	5	55
3	(Ireland) Leinster	18	11	1	6	401	270	+131	38	20	4	2	52
4	(Wales) Ospreys	18	11	0	7	397	319	+78	39	28	3	5	52
5	(Wales) Scarlets	18	9	0	9	376	395	−19	41	46	3	1	40
6	(Wales) Cardiff Blues	18	8	1	9	322	361	−39	31	36	2	2	38
7	(Scotland) Glasgow Warriors	18	7	0	11	349	375	−26	36	41	4	5	37
8	(Ireland) Ulster	18	7	0	11	298	331	−33	30	33	2	6	36
9	(Wales) Newport Gwent Dragons	18	7	0	11	305	429	−124	26	39	1	4	33
10	(Ireland) Connacht	18	4	0	14	224	460	−236	20	54	1	3	20
Under the standard bonus point system, points are awarded as follows: 4 points for a win; 2 points for a draw; 1 bonus point for scoring 4 tries (or more) (Try bonus); 1 bonus point for losing by 7 points (or fewer) (Losing bonus)
Source: RaboDirect PRO12

5 September 2008
19:30

Edinburgh (Scotland)	15–20	(Ireland) Munster
	Report

Murrayfield
Attendance: 5,443
Referee: James Jones

14 September 2008
18:00

Munster (Ireland)	50–6	(Wales) Newport Gwent Dragons
	Report

Musgrave Park
Attendance: 8,685
Referee: Nigel Owens

20 September 2008
19:30

Munster (Ireland)	28–20	(Wales) Cardiff Blues
	Report

Musgrave Park
Attendance: 8,685
Referee: Peter Allan

28 September 2008
19:00

Leinster (Ireland)	0–18	(Ireland) Munster
	Report

RDS Arena
Attendance: 18,500
Referee: Simon McDowell

4 October 2008
19:00

Munster (Ireland)	25–17	(Scotland) Glasgow Warriors
	Report

Thomond Park
Attendance: 22,885
Referee: Andrew Small

25 October 2008
19:30

Ulster (Ireland)	22–6	(Ireland) Munster
	Report

Ravenhill
Attendance: 10,058
Referee: Alain Rolland

28 November 2008
19:05

Scarlets (Wales)	16–18	(Ireland) Munster
	Report

Parc y Scarlets
Attendance: 8,435
Referee: James Jones

28 December 2008
18:00

Connacht (Ireland)	12–6	(Ireland) Munster
	Report

Galway Sportsgrounds
Attendance: 5,000
Referee: Alain Rolland

3 January 2009
19:30

Munster (Ireland)	11–37	(Ireland) Ulster
	Report

Thomond Park
Attendance: 25,623
Referee: Alan Lewis

9 January 2009
19:05

Ospreys (Wales)	21–25	(Ireland) Munster
	Report

Liberty Stadium
Attendance: 9,003
Referee: Andy Macpherson

21 February 2009
19:30

Munster (Ireland)	28–14	(Scotland) Edinburgh
	Report

Musgrave Park
Attendance: 8,685
Referee: Nigel Owens

7 March 2009
17:30

Newport Gwent Dragons (Wales)	9–20	(Ireland) Munster
	Report

Rodney Parade
Attendance: 6,865
Referee: Alan Lewis

27 March 2009
19:45

Glasgow Warriors (Scotland)	13–26	(Ireland) Munster
	Report

Firhill Stadium
Attendance: 3,615
Referee: Tim Hayes

4 April 2009
19:30

Munster (Ireland)	22–5	(Ireland) Leinster
	Report

Thomond Park
Attendance: 26,043
Referee: Christophe Berdos

18 April 2009
19:30

Munster (Ireland)	25–10	(Ireland) Connacht
	Report

Thomond Park
Attendance: 26,043
Referee: James Jones

24 April 2009
19:35

Munster (Ireland)	29–10	(Wales) Scarlets
	Report

Musgrave Park
Attendance: 8,685

10 May 2009
16:35

Cardiff Blues (Wales)	20–12	(Ireland) Munster
	Report

Cardiff Arms Park
Attendance: 7,428
Referee: Peter Allan

15 May 2009
19:45

Munster (Ireland)	36–10	(Wales) Ospreys
	Report

Thomond Park
Attendance: 26,043
Referee: Peter Allan

== 2008–09 Heineken Cup ==
=== Pool 1 ===
Team	P	W	D	L	Tries for	Tries against	Try diff	Points for	Points against	Points diff	TB	LB	Pts
(Ireland) Munster (2)	6	5	0	1	18	6	12	161	98	63	2	1	23
(England) Sale	6	3	0	3	14	11	3	136	115	21	2	1	15
(France) Clermont	6	3	0	3	14	13	1	137	129	8	1	0	13
(France) Montauban	6	1	0	5	5	21	−16	81	173	−92	0	2	6

10 October 2008
20:00

Munster (Ireland)	19–17	(France) Montauban
	Report

Thomond Park
Attendance: 23,500
Referee: Wayne Barnes

19 October 2008
13:00

Sale Sharks (England)	16–24	(Ireland) Munster
	Report

Edgeley Park
Attendance: 10,928
Referee: Christophe Berdos

7 December 2008
16:00

Clermont (France)	25–19	(Ireland) Munster
	Report

Stade Marcel-Michelin
Attendance: 15,355
Referee: Wayne Barnes

13 December 2008
15:30

(Ireland) Munster	23–13	(France) Clermont
	Report

Thomond Park
Attendance: 25,623
Referee: Chris White

16 January 2009
20:00

Munster (Ireland)	37–14	(England) Sale Sharks
	Report

Thomond Park
Attendance: 26,043
Referee: Nigel Owens

25 January 2009
14:00

Montauban (France)	13–39	(Ireland) Munster
	Report

Stade Sapiac
Attendance: 7,223
Referee: Dave Pearson

=== Quarter-final ===
12 April 2009
13:00

Munster (Ireland)	43–9	(Wales) Ospreys
	Report

Thomond Park
Attendance: 26,043
Referee: Wayne Barnes

=== Semi-final ===
2 May 2009
17:30

Munster (Ireland)	6–25	(Ireland) Leinster
	Report

Croke Park
Attendance: 82,208
Referee: Nigel Owens
