= History of rugby union matches between Leinster and Munster =

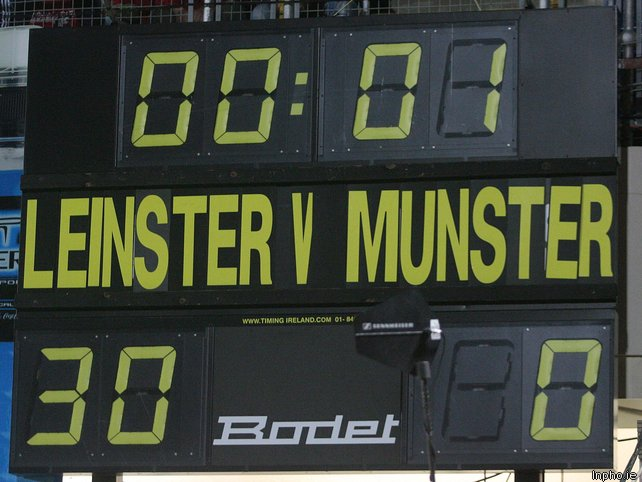
The largest winning margin in the professional era of the fixture, achieved in October 2009

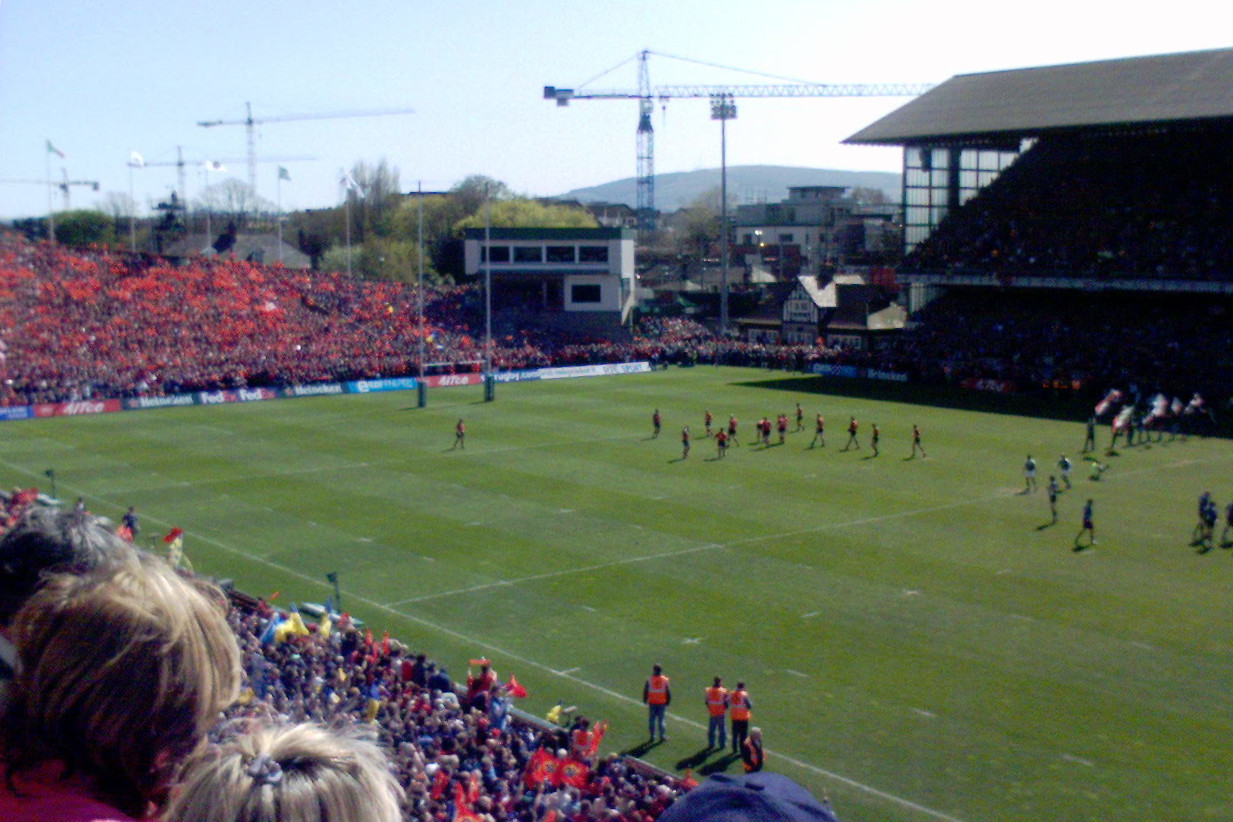
Heineken Cup semi-final between Leinster and Munster at Lansdowne Road in April 2006

Leinster versus Munster is, according to some Irish commentators, one of the biggest provincial rivalries in world rugby, which dates back to 1879, the year of founding of the provincial sides. Games between the two have occurred on an annual basis since the inception of the Irish inter-provincial championship in 1946. Since the beginning of the inter-provincials in 1946, Leinster hold a 66–46 advantage in overall wins, with five draws. Additionally, since the inception of the Celtic League in the 2001–02 season, Leinster hold a 39–19 advantage in overall wins, with one draw in that time.

The fierce rivalry has grown since the turn of professionalism as both teams battled for domestic and European dominance, and has sometimes become a heated and bitter affair, on and off the pitch. The rivalry is heightened by the fact that Leinster and Munster have been among the stronger provinces in Irish rugby, and among the strongest teams in European competition.

The birth of the modern era rivalry could be attributed to the Heineken Cup semi-final in 2006, when Munster defeated Leinster 30–6 in Lansdowne Road en route to winning their first European Championship. Munster then went on to enjoy a period of success by again winning the European trophy in 2008. A shift in fortunes occurred in 2009 however, when Leinster defeated Munster 25–6 at the same stage of the competition in front of 82,208 spectators at Croke Park, which was a world record attendance for a club game; Leinster went on in 2009 to claim the first of four European titles to Munster's two. The matches between the two teams regularly sells out their stadiums, with selected home games for Leinster being moved from the 18,000 seat RDS Arena, to the 51,700 seat Aviva Stadium, or even occasionally the 82,000 capacity Croke Park.

In addition to European competition, the two sides regularly face each other in the United Rugby Championship. Leinster and Munster have consistently been among the strongest teams in that tournament, with Leinster reaching twelve finals winning seven, and Munster reaching seven finals winning three. They have finished top two in the Pro14 championship three times — with Leinster defeating Munster 24–20 in 2002, Munster winning 19–9 in the 2011 final and Leinster defeating Munster 16–6 in the 2021 final.

== Summary of games since 1946 ==
Details	Played	Won by Leinster	Won by Munster	Drawn
Leinster Home	62	40	21	1
Munster Home	55	26	25	4
Overall	117	66	46	5

== Statistics ==
Record	Leinster	Munster
Longest winning streak	6 (2018/19–2020/21)	3 (1989–90–1991/92, 1996/97–1998/99, 2004/05–2005/06)
Largest points for
Home	40 (1996–1997)	33 (2005–2006)
Away	34 (2017–2018)	45 (1996–1997)
Largest winning margin
Home	32 (32–0; 1958–1959)	24 (33–9; 2005–2006)
Away	21 (7–28; 2024–2025)	24 (6–30; 2005–2006)
Largest aggregate score
85 (Leinster 40 Munster 45; 1996–1997)
Lowest aggregate score
0 (Leinster 0 Munster 0; 1953–1954)
Highest attendance
82,208 (2008–09 Heineken Cup Semi-finals, Croke Park, 2 May 2009)

== Results ==
Season	Home	Away	Winner	Note(s)
1946/47	Leinster 15	Munster 11	Leinster (1)	
1947/48	Munster 14	Leinster 11	Munster (1)	
1948/49	Leinster 6	Munster 0	Leinster (2)	
1949/50	Munster 3	Leinster 3	Draw (1)	
1950/51	Leinster 8	Munster 6	Leinster (3)	
1951/52	Munster 9	Leinster 12	Leinster (4)	
1952/53	Leinster 0	Munster 3	Munster (2)	
1953/54	Munster 0	Leinster 0	Draw (2)	Lowest scoring game in history of fixture
1954/55	Leinster 8	Munster 9	Munster (3)	
1955/56	Munster 9	Leinster 12	Leinster (5)	
1956/57	Leinster 19	Munster 9	Leinster (6)	
1957/58	Munster 19	Leinster 12	Munster (4)	
1958/59	Leinster 32	Munster 0	Leinster (7)	Largest winning margin in history of fixture
1959/60	Munster 18	Leinster 14	Munster (5)	
1960/61	Leinster 14	Munster 9	Leinster (8)	
1961/62	Munster 3	Leinster 6	Leinster (9)	
1962/63	Leinster 6	Munster 14	Munster (6)	
1963/64	Munster 6	Leinster 10	Leinster (10)	
1964/65	Leinster 14	Munster 3	Leinster (11)	
1965/66	Munster 6	Leinster 3	Munster (7)	
1966/67	Leinster 5	Munster 9	Munster (8)	
1967/68	Munster 5	Leinster 8	Leinster (12)	
1968/69	Leinster 8	Munster 12	Munster (9)	
1969/70	Munster 6	Leinster 12	Leinster (13)	
1970/71	Leinster 10	Munster 0	Leinster (14)	
1971/72	Munster 0	Leinster 9	Leinster (15)	
1972/73	Leinster 9	Munster 17	Munster (10)	
1973/74	Munster 13	Leinster 3	Munster (11)	
1974/75	Leinster 9	Munster 6	Leinster (16)	
1975/76	Munster 9	Leinster 0	Munster (12)	
1976/77	Leinster 12	Munster 6	Leinster (17)	
1977/78	Munster 15	Leinster 10	Munster (13)	
1978/79	Leinster 3	Munster 12	Munster (14)	
1979/80	Munster 3	Leinster 4	Leinster (18)	
1980/81	Leinster 18	Munster 9	Leinster (19)	
1981/82	Munster 15	Leinster 15	Draw (3)	
1982/83	Leinster 6	Munster 9	Munster (15)	
1983/84	Munster 13	Leinster 22	Leinster (20)	
1984/85	Leinster 15	Munster 9	Leinster (21)	
1985/86	Munster 6	Leinster 15	Leinster (22)	
1986/87	Leinster 15	Munster 3	Leinster (23)	
1987/88	Munster 10	Leinster 3	Munster (16)	
1988/89	Leinster 23	Munster 12	Leinster (24)	
1989/90	Munster 10	Leinster 3	Munster (17)	
1990/91	Leinster 12	Munster 27	Munster (18)	
1991/92	Munster 20	Leinster 3	Munster (19)	
1992/93	Leinster 21	Munster 20	Leinster (25)	
1993/94	Munster 21	Leinster 19	Munster (20)	
1994/95	Leinster 14	Munster 36	Munster (21)	
1995/96	Munster 15	Leinster 19	Leinster (26)	
1996/97	Leinster 40	Munster 45	Munster (22)	Highest scoring match in history of fixture
1997/98	Munster 15	Leinster 12	Munster (23)	
1998/99	Leinster 10	Munster 25	Munster (24)	
1998/99	Munster 18	Leinster 24	Leinster (27)	
1999/00	Leinster 13	Munster 30	Munster (25)	
1999/00	Munster 31	Leinster 20	Munster (26)	
2000/01	Leinster 16	Munster 16	Draw (4)	
2000/01	Munster 26	Leinster 20	Munster (27)	
2001/02	Leinster 24	Munster 20	Leinster (28)	League Final
2001/02	Munster 6	Leinster 6	Draw (5)	
2002/03	N/A	N/A	N/A	No Fixture
2003/04	Leinster 8	Munster 15	Munster (28)	
2003/04	Munster 24	Leinster 13	Munster (29)	
2004/05	Leinster 17	Munster 15	Leinster (29)	
2004/05	Munster 19	Leinster 13	Munster (30)	
2004/05	Leinster 17	Munster 23	Munster (31)	Celtic Cup Semi-Final
2005/06	Munster 33	Leinster 9	Munster (32)	
2005/06	Leinster 35	Munster 23	Leinster (30)	
2005/06	Leinster 6	Munster 30	Munster (33)	European Cup Semi-Final
2006/07	Leinster 27	Munster 20	Leinster (31)	
2006/07	Munster 25	Leinster 11	Munster (34)	
2007/08	Munster 3	Leinster 10	Leinster (32)	
2007/08	Leinster 21	Munster 12	Leinster (33)	
2008/09	Leinster 0	Munster 18	Munster (35)	
2008/09	Munster 22	Leinster 5	Munster (36)	
2008/09	Munster 6	Leinster 25	Leinster (34)	European Cup Semi-Final. At the time the 82,208 in attendance set a world record for a club rugby union match.
2009/10	Leinster 30	Munster 0	Leinster (35)	Largest winning margin in professional era
2009/10	Munster 15	Leinster 16	Leinster (36)	
2009/10	Leinster 16	Munster 6	Leinster (37)	League Semi-Final
2010/11	Leinster 13	Munster 9	Leinster (38)	
2010/11	Munster 24	Leinster 23	Munster (37)	
2010/11	Munster 19	Leinster 9	Munster (38)	League Final
2011/12	Leinster 24	Munster 19	Leinster (39)	
2011/12	Munster 9	Leinster 18	Leinster (40)	
2012/13	Leinster 30	Munster 21	Leinster (41)	
2012/13	Munster 16	Leinster 22	Leinster (42)	
2013/14	Munster 19	Leinster 15	Munster (39)	
2013/14	Leinster 22	Munster 18	Leinster (43)	
2014/15	Leinster 23	Munster 34	Munster (40)	
2014/15	Munster 28	Leinster 13	Munster (41)	
2015/16	Munster 7	Leinster 24	Leinster (44)	
2015/16	Leinster 16	Munster 13	Leinster (45)	
2016/17	Leinster 25	Munster 14	Leinster (46)	
2016/17	Munster 29	Leinster 17	Munster (42)	
2017/18	Leinster 23	Munster 17	Leinster (47)	
2017/18	Munster 24	Leinster 34	Leinster (48)	
2017/18	Leinster 16	Munster 15	Leinster (49)	League Semi-Final
2018/19	Leinster 30	Munster 22	Leinster (50)	
2018/19	Munster 26	Leinster 17	Munster (43)	
2018/19	Leinster 24	Munster 9	Leinster (51)	League Semi-Final
2019/20	Munster 6	Leinster 13	Leinster (52)	
2019/20	Leinster 27	Munster 25	Leinster (53)	
2019/20	Leinster 13	Munster 3	Leinster (54)	League Semi-Final
2020/21	Munster 10	Leinster 13	Leinster (55)	
2020/21	Leinster 16	Munster 6	Leinster (56)	League Final; Most consecutive wins in history of fixture
2020/21	Leinster 3	Munster 27	Munster (44)	Rainbow Cup fixture
2021/22	Munster 19	Leinster 34	Leinster (57)	
2021/22	Leinster 35	Munster 25	Leinster (58)	
2022/23	Leinster 27	Munster 13	Leinster (59)	
2022/23	Munster 19	Leinster 20	Leinster (60)	
2022/23	Leinster 15	Munster 16	Munster (45)	League Semi-final fixture
2023/24	Leinster 21	Munster 16	Leinster (61)	
2023/24	Munster 3	Leinster 9	Leinster (62)	
2024/25	Leinster 26	Munster 12	Leinster (63)	
2024/25	Munster 7	Leinster 28	Leinster (64)	
2025/26	Leinster 14	Munster 31	Munster (46)	
2025/26	Munster 8	Leinster 13	Leinster (65)	
2026/27	Leinster 24	Munster 18	Leinster (66)	

== See also ==
- IRFU Interprovincial Championship
- History of rugby union matches between Leinster and Ulster
- History of rugby union matches between Leinster and Connacht
- History of rugby union matches between Munster and Connacht
- History of rugby union matches between Munster and Ulster
