= 2006–07 Munster Rugby season =

- Ground(s): Thomond Park (Capacity: 13,200); Musgrave Park (Capacity: 8,300)
- CEO: Garrett Fitzgerald
- Coach: Declan Kidney
- Captain: Anthony Foley
- League: Celtic League
- 2006–07: 6th

The 2006–07 Munster Rugby season was Munster's sixth season competing in the Celtic League, alongside which they also competed in the Heineken Cup. It was Declan Kidney's second season as head coach, in his second spell at the province.

== 2006–07 squad ==
Note: Flags indicate national union under World Rugby eligibility rules. Players may hold more than one non-World Rugby nationality.

Player	Position	Union
Denis Fogarty	Hooker	Ireland
Jerry Flannery	Hooker	Ireland
Andi Kyriacou	Hooker	Ireland
Frankie Sheahan	Hooker	Ireland
Tony Buckley	Prop	Ireland
John Hayes	Prop	Ireland
Marcus Horan	Prop	Ireland
Federico Pucciariello	Prop	Italy
Frank Roche	Prop	Ireland
Ross Noonan	Lock	Ireland
Donncha O'Callaghan	Lock	Ireland
Paul O'Connell	Lock	Ireland
Shane O'Connor	Lock	Ireland
Mick O'Driscoll	Lock	Ireland
Donnacha Ryan	Lock	Ireland
Chris Wyatt	Lock	Wales
James Coughlan	Back row	Ireland
Brendan Cuttriss	Back row	Ireland
Anthony Foley (c)	Back row	Ireland
Denis Leamy	Back row	Ireland
Tim McGann	Back row	Ireland
John O'Sullivan	Back row	Ireland
Alan Quinlan	Back row	Ireland
David Wallace	Back row	Ireland

Player	Position	Union
Chris Delooze	Scrum-half	Ireland
Tomás O'Leary	Scrum-half	Ireland
Brian O'Meara	Scrum-half	Ireland
Peter Stringer	Scrum-half	Ireland
Eoghan Hickey	Fly-half	Ireland
Jeremy Manning	Fly-half	Ireland
Ronan O'Gara	Fly-half	Ireland
Trevor Halstead	Centre	South Africa
Jason Holland	Centre	Ireland
John Kelly	Centre	Ireland
Lifeimi Mafi	Centre	New Zealand
Diogo Mateus	Centre	Portugal
Barry Murphy	Centre	Ireland
Ian Dowling	Wing	Ireland
Anthony Horgan	Wing	Ireland
Ciarán O'Boyle	Wing	Ireland
Christian Cullen	Fullback	New Zealand
Shaun Payne*	Fullback	South Africa

== Pre-season ==
25 August 2006

Munster (Ireland)	18–26	(England) Leicester Tigers
	Report

Musgrave Park
Attendance: 6,000

== 2006–07 Celtic League ==
	Team	Pld	W	D	L	PF	PA	PD	TF	TA	Try bonus	Losing bonus	Pts
1	(Wales) Ospreys	20	14	0	6	461	374	+87	49	32	4	4	64
2	(Wales) Cardiff Blues	20	13	1	6	447	327	+120	53	33	6	3	63
3	(Ireland) Leinster	20	12	1	7	472	376	+96	54	37	7	4	61
4	(Wales) Llanelli Scarlets	20	12	0	8	490	417	+73	61	41	9	0	57
5	(Ireland) Ulster	20	11	1	8	423	310	+113	45	31	4	5	55
6	(Ireland) Munster	20	12	0	8	379	294	+85	37	31	3	3	54
7	(Scotland) Glasgow Warriors	20	11	0	9	434	419	+15	42	49	3	2	49
8	(Scotland) Edinburgh	20	8	1	11	335	423	−88	31	45	2	6	42
9	(Wales) Newport Gwent Dragons	20	8	0	12	353	362	−9	36	43	1	6	39
10	(Ireland) Connacht	20	4	2	14	326	474	−148	30	48	2	4	26
11	(Scotland) Border Reivers	20	2	0	18	201	545	−344	16	64	0	4	12
Under the standard bonus point system, points are awarded as follows: 4 points for a win; 2 points for a draw; 1 bonus point for scoring 4 tries (or more) (Try bonus); 1 bonus point for losing by 7 points (or fewer) (Losing bonus)
Source: RaboDirect PRO12

1 September 2006
19:10

Cardiff Blues (Wales)	22–13	(Ireland) Munster
	Report

Cardiff Arms Park
Attendance: 8,687
Referee: Rob Dickson

9 September 2006
19:30

Munster (Ireland)	9–8	(Scotland) Border Reivers
	Report

Thomond Park
Attendance: 6,138
Referee: James Jones

15 September 2006
19:30

Glasgow Warriors (Scotland)	24–13	(Ireland) Munster
	Report

Hughenden
Attendance: 2,295
Referee: Nigel Owens

30 September 2006
19:30

Munster (Ireland)	21–13	(Ireland) Ulster
	Report

Musgrave Park
Attendance: 8,000
Referee: Donal Courtney

6 October 2006
19:30

Leinster (Ireland)	27–20	(Ireland) Munster
	Report

Lansdowne Road
Attendance: 27,252
Referee: Simon McDowell

13 October 2006
19:30

Munster (Ireland)	10–21	(Scotland) Edinburgh
	Report

Thomond Park
Attendance: 8,000
Referee: Phil Fear

5 November 2006
17:30

Scarlets (Wales)	25–12	(Ireland) Munster
	Report

Stradey Park
Attendance: 5,563
Referee: Kelvin Deaker

25 November 2006
19:30

Munster (Ireland)	25–20	(Wales) Ospreys
	Report

Thomond Park
Attendance: 6,254
Referee: Ian Heard

3 December 2006
17:00

Munster (Ireland)	13–0	(Ireland) Connacht
	Report

Thomond Park
Attendance: 5,300
Referee: Donal Courtney

27 December 2006
15:00

Munster (Ireland)	25–11	(Ireland) Leinster
	Report

Thomond Park
Attendance: 13,200
Referee: Alan Lewis

31 December 2006
16:00

Connacht (Ireland)	8–14	(Ireland) Munster
	Report

Galway Sportsgrounds
Attendance: 4,560
Referee: David Keane

5 January 2007
19:10

Newport Gwent Dragons (Wales)	19–12	(Ireland) Munster
	Report

Rodney Parade
Attendance: 5,352
Referee: Andy MacPherson

16 February 2007
19:30

Border Reivers (Scotland)	0–36	(Ireland) Munster
	Report

Netherdale
Attendance: 1,485
Referee: James Jones

2 March 2007
19:40

Munster (Ireland)	12–19	(Wales) Cardiff Blues
	Report

Musgrave Park
Attendance: 8,000

23 March 2007
19:30

Ulster (Ireland)	21–24	(Ireland) Munster
	Report

Ravenhill
Attendance: 12,900
Referee: Alain Rolland

7 April 2007
17:30

Ospreys (Wales)	20–12	(Ireland) Munster
	Report

Liberty Stadium
Attendance: 9,295
Referee: David Changleng

14 April 2007
19:30

Munster (Ireland)	20–0	(Wales) Scarlets
	Report

Musgrave Park
Attendance: 6,500
Referee: Peter Allan

28 April 2007
17:00

Munster (Ireland)	15–7	(Wales) Newport Gwent Dragons
	Report

Musgrave Park
Attendance: 4,517
Referee: Andy Macpherson

4 May 2007
19:30

Edinburgh (Scotland)	9–35	(Ireland) Munster
	Report

Murrayfield
Attendance: 3,129

12 May 2007
17:30

Munster (Ireland)	38–20	(Scotland) Glasgow Warriors
	Report

Musgrave Park
Attendance: 3,311
Referee: Hugh Watkins

== 2006–07 Heineken Cup ==
=== Pool 4 ===
Team	P	W	D	L	Tries for	Tries against	Try diff	Points for	Points against	Points diff	TB	LB	Pts
(England) Leicester Tigers (4)	6	5	0	1	22	6	16	172	60	112	2	1	23
(Ireland) Munster (7)	6	5	0	1	16	11	5	152	112	40	2	1	23
(Wales) Cardiff Blues	6	2	0	4	8	18	−10	87	138	−51	0	1	9
(France) Bourgoin	6	0	0	6	13	24	−11	95	196	−101	2	2	4

Notes:

- Leicester Tigers win the pool on the second tiebreaker of head-to-head tries, 3–2.

22 October 2006
15:00

Leicester Tigers (England)	19–21	(Ireland) Munster
	Report

Welford Road
Attendance: 16,000
Referee: Nigel Owens

28 October 2006
17:30

Munster (Ireland)	41–23	(France) Bourgoin
	Report

Thomond Park
Attendance: 13,200
Referee: Wayne Barnes

10 December 2006
17:30

Cardiff Blues (Wales)	12–22	(Ireland) Munster
	Report

Cardiff Arms Park
Attendance: 12,180
Referee: Christophe Berdos

16 December 2006
17:35

Munster (Ireland)	32–18	(Wales) Cardiff Blues
	Report

Thomond Park
Attendance: 13,200

14 January 2007
14:00

Bourgoin (France)	27–30	(Ireland) Munster
	Report

Stade de Genève
Attendance: 16,255

20 January 2007
17:35

Munster (Ireland)	6–13	(England) Leicester Tigers
	Report

Thomond Park
Attendance: 12,257

=== Quarter-final ===
30 March 2007
19:30

Scarlets (Wales)	24–15	(Ireland) Munster
	Report

Stradey Park
Attendance: 10,800
Referee: Chris White
