= Munster Rugby =

Irish provincial rugby union team

- Union: (Ireland) IRFU
- Nickname: The Red Army
- Founded: 1879; 147 years ago
- Location: Limerick and Cork, Ireland
- Ground(s): Thomond Park (Capacity: 25,600) (Note: Thomond Park's official capacity is 25,600 but can be expanded up to 26,276 with temporary seating.); Musgrave Park (Capacity: 8,800)
- Chairman: Ger Malone
- CEO: Ian Flanagan
- President: Seán Loftus
- Coach: Clayton McMillan
- Captain: Tadhg Beirne
- Most appearances: Stephen Archer (304)
- Top scorer: Ronan O'Gara (2,625)
- Most tries: Simon Zebo (73)
- League: United Rugby Championship
- 2024–25: Quarter-finalists (play-offs); 6th (regular season); 2nd, Irish Shield
1st kit	2nd kit	3rd kit

Official website
- www.munsterrugby.ie
- Current season

Munster Rugby (Irish: Rugbaí Mumhan) is one of the professional provincial rugby teams from the island of Ireland. They compete in the United Rugby Championship and the European Rugby Champions Cup. The team represents the IRFU's Munster Branch, which is responsible for rugby union throughout the Irish province of Munster. The team motto is "To the brave and faithful, nothing is impossible." This is derived from the motto of the MacCarthy clan – "Forti et Fideli nihil difficile". Their main home ground is Thomond Park, Limerick, though some games are played at Musgrave Park, Cork.

== History ==
=== Foundation and early years ===
The first interprovincial matches between Leinster, Ulster and Munster were held in 1875, and the Munster branch was officially founded in 1879, when the Irish Rugby Football Union was formed from two previous regional governing bodies. The founding of branches was intended to organise and oversee the game within the provinces, and prevent club bias by providing neutral selectors for the representative side, although early rivalries between Limerick and Cork regional representatives remained.

In the early twentieth century, the branch established an independent committee, abandoning the previous system of alternating between Limerick and Cork officials, took control of the provincial league and Senior Cup competitions, and established the Junior Cup and Schools Cup in 1909.

In the 1940s, the ad hoc interprovincial matches would become a formalised as the Interprovincial Championship, although the predominant public interest in the provincial team was in the occasional matches against touring international teams. Continued disputes around provincial team selections saw a trial match system established in 1944, with the best players from these matches reoresentong the province.

=== Games against touring sides ===
Munster has a great tradition of competitiveness and impassioned displays against touring sides. The first touring side to play Munster were the famous Original All Blacks led by Dave Gallaher, who lined out against Munster in the Markets Field, Limerick in November 1905. Munster were defeated that day 33–0. Throughout the years, Munster were to record a number of near-misses and last minute defeats against South Africa, Australia and New Zealand. The first tangible result against a touring side was to come in 1958, when the Wallabies were held to a 3–3 draw in Thomond Park. Munster became the first Irish provincial side to defeat a major touring team when they defeated Australia 11–8 in Musgrave Park, Cork on 25 January 1967. Munster were captained that day by Tom Kiernan.

==== Against New Zealand ====
Munster first played the All Blacks in 1905, losing 33–0 on the occasion. They have played each other many times since then. Munster drew with New Zealand 3–3 in 1973 and, in 1978, became, at the time, the only Irish side to have beaten the All Blacks. The 12–0 victory occurred on Tuesday 31 October 1978 at Thomond Park, in front of a crowd of 12,000, though many times that number still claim to have been present, such was the occasion. Christy Cantillon scored a try with Tony Ward converting. Ward also added a drop-goal in each half. Until the national team's victory on 5 November 2016, it was the only time an All Blacks team lost to any Irish side in the men's game and forms part of Munster Rugby mythology. A stage play named Alone it Stands (by John Breen) and a book entitled Stand Up and Fight: When Munster Beat the All Blacks by Alan English were both based on the event. Both have been commercially successful; Alone it Stands has had several sell-out runs in Ireland and abroad and Stand Up and Fight was a bestseller in 2005.

The All Blacks returned to Thomond Park in November 2008 to commemorate the 30th anniversary of the 1978 match and to celebrate the opening of the new stadium. After 76 minutes of the match, Munster were winning 16–13, but a late try from Joe Rokocoko meant the All Blacks won 18–16.

On 11 November 2016, Munster welcomed the Māori All Blacks to Thomond Park. The Māori players paid tribute to Anthony Foley by placing a jersey with his initials on the halfway line before performing the Haka. Māori captain Ash Dixon then presented the jersey to Foley's sons. Munster went on to win the historic game 27–14.

On 3 February 2024, Munster hosted a world first 'Clash of Champions' against the Crusaders, the 14-time champions of Super Rugby, at Páirc Uí Chaoimh in Cork. Munster edged out the Crusaders to win 21–19, having led 14–7 at half-time. The Crusaders were coached by Former Munster Head Coach Rob Penney.

==== Against Australia ====
Like the All Blacks, Munster have played Australia many times. They first met in 1947, when Australia won 6–5. Munster claimed their first victory over the Wallabies in 1967 when they won 11–8. In 1992, Australia, then-reigning world champions having won the 1991 Rugby World Cup, visited Munster as part of a European tour. Munster won 22–19 in a rough encounter in Cork. Ten years later, London newspaper The Daily Telegraph recounted part of the legend in a feature on Munster prop Peter Clohessy: "The then Wallabies coach, Bob Dwyer, who was not a man who readily accepted that opposition sides could legitimately score more points than his team, immediately branded the Munster number 3 a 'disgrace'. It had been a typically rugged, robust and memorable Munster triumph, with leather and fists flying on both sides. Clohessy, who wouldn't generally be known for misconduct, was no more guilty than the next man but world champions are not supposed to lose against a hastily assembled Irish provincial XV. There had to be a reason, an excuse, and Dwyer rounded on Clohessy".

History repeated itself in 2010 when Munster defeated the Wallabies 15–6, with their Australian fly-half, Paul Warwick, kicking all fifteen points (three penalties and 2 drop goals). The match was played in ferocious weather, with Munster playing into a gale-force wind and driving rain in the first-half. Indeed, the conditions made the half time score of 6–6 all the more significant, as Australia could neither cope with the weather nor the Munster pressure in the second-half.

==== Against South Africa ====
Munster have played South Africa much less frequently than they have Australia and New Zealand. The first fixture between the two sides took place on 11 December 1951 in Thomond Park, with the visitors emerging with an 11–6 win after a late try broke the deadlock. South Africa returned to face the province for a second time on 22 December 1960, this time at Musgrave Park. They again secured a narrow win against the province, needing two late scores for a 9–3 win. The third meeting between the sides was less of a close-run thing, with South Africa easing to a 25–9 win in Thomond Park on 11 January 1970.

After the GAA Central Council unanimously backed the proposal, Munster confirmed they would face a South Africa XV in a friendly held at Cork GAA's 45,000-capacity Páirc Uí Chaoimh on 10 November 2022. It was the first time Munster have faced a South African national team in the professional era and the first time a game of rugby was held at the stadium. The match was a 41,400 sell-out at Páirc Uí Chaoimh, making it the largest attendance for a rugby match in the province, and saw Munster secure their first ever win against South Africa in a 28–14 victory. Winger Shane Daly opened the scoring in just the 2nd minute, with fly-half Ben Healy converting to give the home side a 7–0 lead. South Africa hit back in the 12th minute through an Aphelele Fassi try that was converted by Johan Goosen to level the score, but Munster struck back with tries from Simon Zebo and Diarmuid Barron, both converted by Healy, to head into half-time with a 21–7. Munster struck early in the second-half, with fullback Mike Haley scoring after just two minutes and Healy's fourth conversion of the night extending their lead to 28–7. South Africa scored their second try in the 62nd minute when Sikhumbuzo Notshe crossed the try-line, converted by Gianni Lombard, but the visitors were unable to mount a comeback and Munster hung on to earn a famous win.

=== Professional era ===
On 26 August 1995, the International Rugby Board declared rugby union an "open" game, removing all restrictions on payments or benefits to those connected with the game. This was done due to a committee conclusion that having an open game was the only way to end the hypocrisy of shamateurism, and keep control of the sport. The threat to amateur rugby union was mostly prevalent in the Southern hemisphere, particularly in Australia where Super League was threatening to entice players to rugby league with large salaries. In Ireland, the four provincial teams were the only teams to go professional, while their smaller constituent clubs remained amateur.

The 1995–96 season saw the first ever Heineken Cup, a new tournament set up for European clubs. The Irish were allocated three places in the competition, with these places going to Leinster, Munster and Ulster. Munster finally reached the Heineken Cup quarter-finals in 1998–99 Heineken Cup, after three years of not being able to get out of the group stages.

=== Near-misses and European glory (1999–2009) ===
Munster's first appearance in the Heineken Cup's final was in the 1999–2000 Heineken Cup, where they lost by one point to Northampton at Twickenham. Nevertheless, the season was most memorable with a 31–25 win over Toulouse in Bordeaux.

Their good form and bad luck continued in the following season, 2000–01, with a semi-final defeat to Stade Français Paris, again by one point, where a try from John O'Neill was disallowed by the referee, as he deemed the ball to be out over the dead-ball line. In the 2001–02 Heineken Cup, Munster lost the last match of their pool at Castres, but qualified as best runners-up. Munster beat Stade Français 16–14 in Paris, the only try of the game coming from Anthony Horgan. It was then on to Béziers to meet Castres again for the semi-final. Munster were triumphant and went to the final at Millennium Stadium to meet the reigning champions, Leicester. Munster lost a tight game remembered as 'the hand of Back' final, as the Leicester flanker used his hand illegally in a scrum when Munster had a last-chance attack. Munster also reached the final of the Celtic League in this season, but lost 24–20 to Leinster at Lansdowne Road, Dublin.

In 2002–03, Munster reached the quarter-finals after a win against Gloucester, later issued on VHS under the title "The Miracle Match". In this game, Munster needed to win by a margin of at least 27 points and score a minimum of four tries to earn a quarter-final berth. They won 33–6 with four tries in a game that has become part of Munster Rugby folklore. They again faced Leicester, this time at the Tigers' home of Welford Road, and defeated the reigning champions to progress to the semi-finals. They faced Toulouse in the semi-finals and lost out on a place in the final after losing by a single point in France. In this season, Munster won the Celtic League for the first time, by beating Neath-Swansea Ospreys 37–17 at the Millennium Stadium, Cardiff.

In 2003–04 it was more of the same. After an assured performance in the pool stage, Munster defeated Stade Français Paris at Thomond Park to set up a semi-final date with English champions, London Wasps. This match has gone down as one of the best Heineken Cup matches of all time. Although leading by 10 points in the second half, and having lost Ronan O'Gara to injury early on, they succumbed to two Wasps tries in injury time, resulting in a Wasps v Toulouse final. Munster finished in a disappointing seventh position in the 2003–04 season of the Celtic League.

In 2004–05, after a shaky performance in the pool stage, Munster qualified as 5th seeds and played Biarritz away. The match was played at Real Sociedad's ground, the Anoeta Stadium, in San Sebastián, Spain – the first Heineken Cup game ever played in Spain. Biarritz won 19–10 to avenge a 38–29 defeat at the same stage in 2001. Munster finished second in the 2004–05 Celtic League season but won the Celtic Cup, defeating Llanelli Scarlets 27–16 in the final.

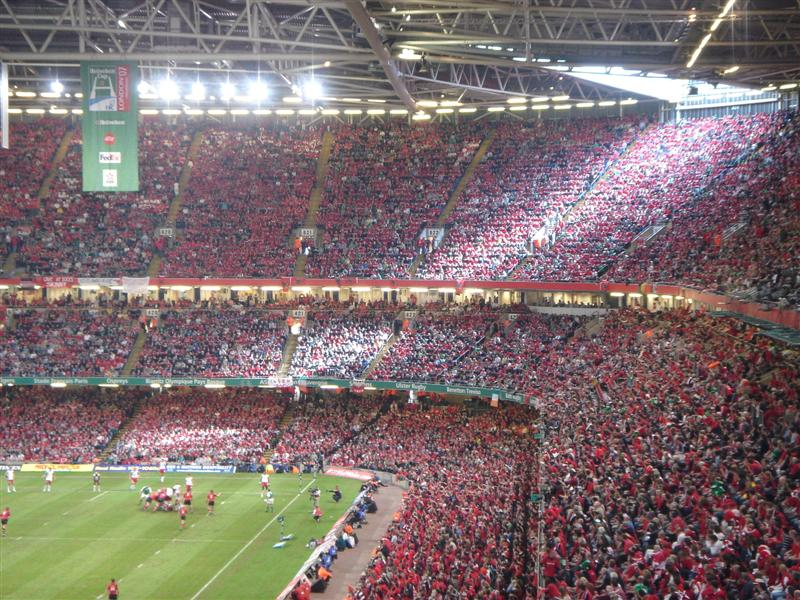
Inside the Millennium Stadium for the 2006 final, where over 65,000 Munster fans were present

In 2005–06, Munster qualified to the final of the Heineken Cup, having overcome rivals Leinster 30–6 in the semi-final at Lansdowne Road. The final was held at the Millennium Stadium against Biarritz. Munster won 23–19 to become European Champions for the first time. Munster finished one place lower than the previous season in the Celtic League, finishing third overall.

The 2006–07 Heineken Cup was a disappointing tournament for Munster, as they lost their previously unbeaten European record at Thomond Park, losing to Leicester Tigers in the group stages in January 2007, and later lost their quarter-final to Llanelli Scarlets. Munster's performance in the Celtic League was equally disappointing, finishing sixth overall.

In 2007, Munster signed Doug Howlett, the all-time leading try scorer for New Zealand. Howlett joined the squad after the 2007 Rugby World Cup. That season's Heineken Cup saw Munster finish top in their group, and they went on to reach the final for the second time in three years, beating Saracens in the semi-final. The final, again held at the Millennium Stadium, saw Munster defeat Toulouse 16–13 to claim their second Heineken Cup title in 3 years. Munster finished third in the Celtic League in the 2007–08 season. In May 2008, Director of Coaching Declan Kidney left to take up the head coach job with Ireland. Munster ensured continuity by promoting Australian Tony McGahan to the position from within the coaching setup.

In the 2008–09 Heineken Cup, Munster once again topped their group and hammered Ospreys 43–9 to advance to a semi-final against arch-rivals Leinster. Many had fancied Munster to become only the second team to win back-to-back Heineken Cups, but a dominant Leinster side gained revenge for their 2006 semi-final defeat against Munster with a 25–6 win in Croke Park, in front of a then-world record 82,208 crowd. Munster clinched the Celtic League for the second time in their history, after their closest challengers Ospreys beat Dragons but failed to claim a bonus point. This handed the title to Munster who could not be overtaken at the top of the table.

=== The McGahan and Penney years (2009–2014) ===
The 2009–10 season saw Munster finish top of their Heineken Cup pool once again. Victories over Northampton Saints, French Top 14 champions Perpignan and Italian side Benetton saw Munster qualify for the Heineken Cup quarter-finals for a record 12th consecutive year. The match took place at Thomond Park, where Munster played Northampton Saints for the third time that season and won 33–19. They lost 18–7 in the semi-finals against Biarritz at the Anoeta. Munster came 4th in the Celtic League, but because this season saw the introduction of a play-off system for the top four teams, Munster met and lost 16–6 to Leinster in the play-off semi-final.

The 2010–11 season saw Munster drawn in pool 3 of the Heineken Cup alongside Ospreys, London Irish and Toulon. Munster lost 23–17 away to London Irish, before defeating Toulon 45–18 at Thomond Park. Munster defeated Ospreys 22–16, but lost the reverse fixture at Liberty Stadium 19–15. In round 5 Munster went to Toulon, losing 32–16. As a result, Munster failed to qualify for the quarter-finals of the Heineken Cup for the first time in 13 years. Munster won their final pool game, at home to London Irish, 28–14, and qualified for the 2010–11 European Challenge Cup quarter-finals. Munster defeated Leinster 24–23 on 2 April 2011 in the Celtic League, ending a run of 5 straight defeats against their provincial rivals. Munster beat Brive 42–37 in their Challenge Cup quarter-final to qualify for the semi-final against Harlequins on 30 April. Munster lost the semi-final in Thomond Park 20–12. Munster finished first in the 2010–11 Celtic League. They beat Ospreys 18–11 in their semi-final to set up a Grand Final with Leinster, which Munster won 19–9, securing a third Celtic League title.

Munster were drawn in pool one for the 2011–12 Heineken Cup, alongside Northampton Saints, Scarlets and Castres. They beat Northampton 23–21 in the first pool game at Thomond Park, after an 83rd minute drop-goal from Ronan O'Gara. In their second pool game, Munster beat Castres 24–27, with O'Gara again scoring an overtime drop-goal to secure victory. Munster won their third pool game, away to Scarlets, 17–14. In the return fixture a week later, Munster won 19–13. A 26–10 win over Castres on 14 January 2012 ensured that Munster qualified for the quarter-finals of the 2011–12 Heineken Cup. Munster ended their 2011–12 Heineken Cup pool fixtures with a 51–36 victory against Northampton Saints, securing the top seed in the quarter-finals and winning 6 out of 6 pool matches for the first time. Munster lost their quarter-final against Ulster 22–16, losing just their second match at home in the Heineken Cup. Munster finished third in the 2011–12 Pro12, and played Ospreys away in the play-off semi-finals, losing 45–10. It was announced on 22 February 2012 that McGahan would be leaving Munster at the end of the 2011–12 season, to take up a role of coaching co-ordinator on Australia's management team. Rob Penney, coach of Canterbury and New Zealand U20, was chosen to succeed McGahan, being unveiled as the next Munster coach on 2 May 2012.

Munster were again drawn in pool one for the 2012–13 Heineken Cup, with Saracens, Edinburgh and Racing 92. The campaign opened with a 22–17 away defeat at the hands of Racing 92. Munster won their second game, at home to Edinburgh, 33–0. The December back-to-back games began with a home fixture against Saracens, which Munster won 15–9. In the reverse fixture, Munster lost 19–13. In the fifth round of pool fixtures, Munster beat Edinburgh 26–17. Munster had to win their final pool game, against Racing 92, with a try bonus-point to have a chance of qualifying for the quarter-finals. Munster won the game 29–6, scoring five tries, including a hat-trick from Simon Zebo. Leicester Tigers' 9–5 victory over Toulouse ensured that Munster qualified as a second-best runner-up, and they played Harlequins in the quarter-finals. Munster won the quarter-final 18–12, advancing to the semi-finals, which they lost 16–10 to Clermont on 27 April 2013. Munster finished sixth in the 2012–13 Pro12.

Munster were drawn in pool 6 for the 2013–14 Heineken Cup, alongside Perpignan, Edinburgh and Gloucester. Edinburgh beat Munster 29–23 in the opening pool fixture on 12 October 2013. In their second pool game on 19 October 2013, Munster beat Gloucester 26–10. Munster beat Perpignan 36–8 in round 3, and, in the round 4 reverse fixture on 14 December 2013, won 18–17 in Perpignan. Munster beat Gloucester 20–7 at Kingsholm on 11 January 2014, a win that secured quarter-final qualification. Munster beat Edinburgh 38–6 on 19 January 2014 in round 6, a bonus-point win that secured a home quarter-final. On 6 February 2014, it was announced that Penney and backs coach Simon Mannix would be leaving Munster at the end of the 2013–14 season. Former captain and then-forwards coach Anthony Foley was confirmed as the next Munster coach on 19 February 2014. In their quarter-final, Munster beat Toulouse 47–23. Munster lost 24–16 to Toulon in the semi-final on 27 April 2014. Munster finished third in the 2013–14 Pro12, but lost 16–15 to Glasgow Warriors in the semi–final.

=== Champions Cup begins (2014–2017) ===
Munster were drawn in pool 1 of the 2014–15 European Rugby Champions Cup, alongside Saracens, Clermont and Sale Sharks. A late drop-goal from Ian Keatley gave Munster a 27–26 away win against Sale Sharks in round 1 on 18 October 2014. Munster beats Saracens 14–3 in round 2 on 24 October 2014. Clermont beat Munster 16–9 at Thomond Park in round 3 on 6 December 2014, becoming the first French team to beat Munster at their home stadium. In the reverse fixture on 14 December 2014, Clermont beat Munster 26–19. Saracens beat Munster 33–10 on 17 January 2015 in round 5, a defeat which meant Munster failed to qualify for the knockout stages for only the second time in 17 seasons. In round 6, Munster beat Sale Sharks 65–10, a win that was their 100th in Europe. Munster finished second on the 2014–15 Pro12. In the play-off semi-final, Munster beat Ospreys 21–18. Munster were beaten 31–13 by Glasgow Warriors in the 2015 Pro12 Grand Final on 30 May 2015.

Munster were drawn in pool 4 of the 2015–16 European Rugby Champions Cup, alongside Stade Français Paris, Leicester Tigers and Benetton. On 14 November 2015, Munster beat Treviso 32–7 in their opening pool game. Munster's second pool game, against Stade Français, was postponed following the November 2015 Paris attacks. The match was scheduled to be played at the Stade Jean-Bouin in Paris. Munster lost 31–19 to Leicester Tigers in round 3 on 12 December 2015. In the return fixture on 20 December 2015, Leicester beat Munster 17–6. On 9 January 2016, Munster lost 27–7 to Stade Français in the re-arranged second pool game. A week later, Munster beat Stade Français 26–13. In their final pool game on 24 January 2016, Munster beat Treviso 28–5. In April 2016, it was confirmed that former Springbok Rassie Erasmus would be joining Munster as the director of rugby on a three-year contract, beginning on 1 July 2016. Munster finished 6th in the 2015–16 Pro12.

Munster were drawn in pool 1 of the 2016–17 European Rugby Champions Cup, alongside Racing 92, Leicester Tigers and Glasgow Warriors. In October 2016, Munster's head coach and former captain Anthony Foley died while the team were in Paris for the first pool game against Racing 92. Due to the sad and sudden passing of Foley, the fixture was rescheduled. On 22 October 2016, in the first game since Foley's death, Munster beat Glasgow 38–17 at a sold-out Thomond Park. Tributes were paid to Foley before, during and after the game and the number 8 jersey was retired for the game, with CJ Stander wearing the number 24 for the occasion. On 10 December 2016, Munster beat Leicester 38–0 in round 3 of the Champions Cup. On 17 December 2016, Leicester won the reverse fixture in Welford Road 18–16 after a last-minute penalty from Owen Williams. On 7 January 2017, in the rescheduled round 1 fixture, Munster beat Racing 92 32–7 away from home. Simon Zebo's opening try was Munster's 400th in European competition. On 14 January 2017, Munster beat Glasgow 14–12 away from home to secure qualification for the quarter-finals. On 21 January 2017, in front of 26,200 spectators in Thomond Park, Munster beat Racing 92 22–10 in round 6 of the pool stage, securing a home quarter-final On 1 April 2017, in the quarter-final, Munster beat Toulouse 41–16 to progress to the semi-finals. On 22 April 2017, Munster were beaten 26–10 by defending champions Saracens in the Champions Cup semi-final, which was held in the Aviva Stadium, Dublin. Munster finished 1st after the 22-round regular season of the 2016–17 Pro12, with a record total of 86 points. On 20 May 2017, in their play-off semi-final, Munster beat Ospreys 23–3 in Thomond Park. 7 days later, in the 2017 Pro12 Grand Final, Munster lost 46–22 to Scarlets.

=== Pro14 expansion ===
When the draw for the 2017–18 European Rugby Champions Cup was made, Munster were drawn in pool 4 alongside Leicester Tigers, Racing 92 and Castres. It marked the third season in a row in which Munster faced Leicester and the second season in a row in which they will play Racing 92. On 30 June 2017, it was confirmed after weeks of speculation that director of rugby Rassie Erasmus and defence coach Jacques Nienaber would leave the province in December of that year.

In August 2017, Celtic Rugby Limited and the South African Rugby Union confirmed that the two South African teams that had been cut from the southern hemisphere Super Rugby competition, Cheetahs and Southern Kings, would be joining an expanded Pro14 league ahead of the 2017–18 season. Due to the addition of two new teams, the league format was changed to feature two conferences, A and B, with Munster being placed in conference A alongside Cardiff Blues, Ospreys, Glasgow Warriors, Connacht, Cheetahs and Zebre Parma.

In October 2017, Munster confirmed that then-South Africa forwards coach Johann van Graan would join the province in November as their new head coach. In the same month, it was announced that Munster's all-time leading try scorer, Simon Zebo, would leave the province at the end of the season. In rounds 1 and 2 of the 2017–18 European Rugby Champions Cup in October 2017, Munster drew 17–17 away to Castres before earning a 14–7 win at home to Racing 92. Erasmus and Nienaber left Munster in early November 2017, with the province confirming their departure on 13 November 2017. Johann van Graan's first official game as Munster's new head coach was a 36–19 win away against Zebre Parma in the Pro14 on 26 November 2017. Lions defence coach JP Ferreira joined Munster in December 2017. In the December Champions Cup double-header against Leicester Tigers, Munster won 33–10 at home before winning 25–16 away, their first win at Welford Road for 11 years. In doing so, Munster became the first team to defeat Leicester in both games of the double-header since they were introduced in 1999, while the home victory also saw Munster surpass 4,000 points in the competition. In rounds 5 and 6 of the Champions Cup, Munster lost 34–30 away to Racing 92 before beating Castres 48–3 at home, securing a record 17th quarter-final. Munster beat 3-time tournament champions Toulon 20–19 in the quarter-final after a late Andrew Conway try and conversion from Ian Keatley. In the semi-final, Munster were beaten 27–22 by their French pool 4 opponents Racing 92.

Munster finished 2nd in conference A of the 2017–18 Pro14 season on 69 points. In their semi-final qualifier against Edinburgh on 5 May 2018, Munster won 20–16 to progress to a semi-final away from home. In the semi-final against recently crowned Champions Cup winners and arch-rivals Leinster on 19 May 2018, Munster lost 16–15, bringing to an end their 2017–18 season.

Munster played two pre-season fixtures ahead of the 2018–19 campaign, the first against London Irish, whose directory of rugby was former Munster and Ireland head coach Declan Kidney, and the second against Exeter Chiefs, which was the first meeting between the two clubs. Munster beat London Irish 32–28, but lost 12–0 against Exeter Chiefs.

Drawn alongside French Top 14 champions Castres and English sides Exeter Chiefs and Gloucester, Munster competed in pool 2 of the 2018–19 European Rugby Champions Cup. Munster opened their 2018–19 Pro14 season with a six-try 38–0 victory against South African side Cheetahs in Thomond Park on 1 September 2018. Rory Scannell, Dave Kilcoyne, Tommy O'Donnell, JJ Hanrahan, Dave O'Callaghan and Man-of-the-Match Darren Sweetnam scored the tries, with Hanrahan adding four conversions, in a match that saw Arno Botha, Mike Haley, Joey Carbery and academy players Shane Daly and Gavin Coombes make their competitive debuts for the province, whilst Neil Cronin also made his first appearance for Munster since March 2015.

Tadhg Beirne made his debut for Munster in the provinces 25–10 defeat away to Glasgow Warriors on 7 September 2018. Munster's 64–7 win against Ulster on 29 September 2018 was a record win for the province in the Pro14; Munster's previous record win being 47–0 against Zebre Parma in 2016. In round one of the 2018–19 Champions Cup on 13 October 2018, a try from Stander and five points from the boot of Joey Carbery secured a 10–10 draw in Sandy Park against Exeter Chiefs, in a match in which Dan Goggin and Neil Cronin made their competitive European debuts, whilst Tadhg Beirne, who was Man-of-the-Match, Mike Haley and Joey Carbery made their European debuts for Munster. One week later, tries from Mike Haley, Rhys Marshall, Joey Carbery, who also kicked four conversions and one penalty in a Man-of-the-Match performance, Sammy Arnold and Andrew Conway helped Munster to a 36–22 bonus-point victory at home against Gloucester.

In the December 2018 back-to-back Champions Cup fixtures against Castres, Munster won 30–5 in round 3 on 9 December, with tries from Rory Scannell, Stander and JJ Hanrahan, who also scored 15 points off the kicking tee. In the return leg away to Castres on 15 December, the French side won 13–12, with Joey Carbery scoring all of Munster's points from penalties. In round 5 of the Champions Cup, Munster beat Gloucester 41–15 away from home on 11 January 2019, with the tries coming from Joey Carbery (2), Rory Scannell, Keith Earls and Andrew Conway and 16 points of the kicking tee from Carbery. In round 6, Munster beat Exeter Chiefs 9–7 in Thomond Park on 19 January 2019 to advance to a record 18th Champions Cup quarter-final. Joey Carbery scored all of Munster's points from penalties in a closely fought, physical game. Munster defeated Edinburgh 17–13 in their quarter-final in Murrayfield Stadium on 30 March 2019 to advance to a 14th Champions Cup semi-final, which Munster lost 32–16 to Saracens in the Ricoh Arena on 20 April 2019.

Munster finished second in conference A in the 2018–19 Pro14 season, with 21 wins and 5 defeats, and beat Italian side Benetton 15–13 in their quarter-final on 4 May 2019, to secure a semi-final against provincial rivals Leinster in the RDS on 18 May 2019. which Leinster won 24–9, bringing to an end Munster's 2018–19 season.

=== 2019–2022 ===
Backs coach Felix Jones and forwards coach Jerry Flannery left the province when their contracts expired in June 2019. Graham Rowntree joined the province as their new forwards coach after the completion of his duties with Georgia at the 2019 Rugby World Cup. Stephen Larkham, attack coach for the Australian national team, also joined the province as a senior coach ahead of the 2019–20 season.

Club legend and head of commercial and marketing, Doug Howlett, also left the province to return to New Zealand in the summer of 2019, ending his 11-year association with Munster. Munster's CEO Garrett Fitzgerald retired upon reaching retirement age in June 2019. Fitzgerald was Munster's first CEO and had been in the post since 1999, making him the longest serving provincial chief executive in Irish rugby at the time. Ian Flanagan, who was born in Cork and previously worked at Leicester City F.C, was appointed to replace Fitzgerald.

In a change from the previous two seasons, Munster were in conference B for the 2019–20 Pro14 season, alongside Benetton, Cardiff Blues, Connacht, Edinburgh, Scarlets and Southern Kings. This will also be the case for the 2020–21 season, and the change was made based on the points total each club achieved after the completion of the regular 2018–19 season.

Munster were seeded in tier 2 when the draw for the 2019–20 European Rugby Champions Cup was made in Lausanne, Switzerland on Wednesday 19 June 2019, and were drawn in pool 4 alongside defending champions Saracens, Racing 92, who count former Munster players Donnacha Ryan and Simon Zebo amongst their squad, and fellow Pro14 side Ospreys.

Munster opened their 2019–20 Pro14 season with a 39–9 home victory against Welsh side Dragons on 28 September 2019, with the tries coming from Arno Botha, Jack O'Donoghue, Man-of-the-Match Shane Daly, Tyler Bleyendaal and academy member Diarmuid Barron, and fly-half JJ Hanrahan contributing 14 points off the kicking tee. New signing Nick McCarthy and academy members Keynan Knox and Jack O'Sullivan all made their senior competitive debuts for the province, and hooker Kevin O'Byrne won his 50th cap. Short-term signing Jed Holloway made his debut for the province in their 31–20 away win against South African side Southern Kings on 5 October 2019.

In the opening two rounds of the 2019–20 Champions Cup, Munster beat Welsh Pro14 rivals Ospreys 32–13 away from home on 16 November 2019, with tries from Jeremy Loughman, Keith Earls, Andrew Conway and James Cronin and twelve points off the kicking tee from Tyler Bleyendaal, before drawing 21–21 at home against French side Racing 92 on 23 November 2019; Munster's tries came from Keith Earls and Andrew Conway, and JJ Hanrahan contributed eleven points with the boot. The draw was Munster's first at home in the Champions Cup, against a Racing side that included former Munster players Donnacha Ryan and Simon Zebo in their starting XV.

Prop Stephen Archer won his 200th cap for Munster in their 2019–20 Pro14 round 7 fixture against Edinburgh on 29 November 2019, becoming the eleventh player to achieve the accolade for the province. Academy fly-half Ben Healy made his debut for Munster during the same game, scoring 11 points in the 18–16 defeat to the Scottish side.

In the Champions Cup back-to-backs against defending champions Saracens, Munster won 10–3 at home on 7 December 2019, with the English side picking up a losing bonus point. In the return fixture one week later, Munster were beaten 15–6, with two tries in the final quarter securing the win for Saracens and denying Munster a losing bonus point.

Following an incident that triggered a large brawl in Munster's second fixture against Saracens in December 2019 and a complaint to the EPCR from Saracens, in which Munster team doctor Jamie Kearns was accused of verbally abusing Saracens hooker Jamie George, an independent panel upheld the complaint and found that Kearns had breached the EPCR's disciplinary rules, handing Kearns a three-week ban, suspended for 12 months, and a fine of €2,000 to be paid immediately.

Munster went into their round 5 Champions Cup clash away to Racing 92 on 12 January 2020 knowing that they had to win to keep alive their hopes of progressing to the quarter-finals of the tournament, but despite leading the French club with ten minutes to go, late tries from Racing secured a 39–22 win for the home side. Munster needed results elsewhere to go their way if they were to stand any chance of qualifying for the quarter-finals as the final round of pool matches took place, but Glasgow Warriors 45–7 win against Sale Sharks ended those hopes before Munster's final game against Ospreys had even taken place. In the event, Munster won 33–6 against Ospreys, with Craig Casey, who made his European debut for the province in the defeat to Racing, scoring his first try for Munster, and Calvin Nash, Jack O'Sullivan and Ben Healy making their European debuts for the province.

Munster's 68–3 win against South African side Southern Kings in round 11 of the Pro14 on 14 February 2020 was a record margin of victory for the province in the competition, and the ten tries scored also set a new record for the province. Academy member John Hodnett made his debut for Munster in the fixture, scoring a try and earning the Man-of-the-Match award. The match had an added poignancy for Munster, as their long-serving former CEO, Garrett Fitzgerald, who had only retired in June 2019, died following a battle with illness earlier that day.

The 2019–20 Pro14 was suspended indefinitely by tournament organisers on 12 March 2020 in response to the ongoing coronavirus pandemic. Munster's round 14 and 15 fixtures against Italian side Benetton had already been postponed. Tyler Bleyendaal was forced to retire from playing rugby with immediate effect in May 2020 due to a persistent neck injury. In the same month, prop Brian Scott was also forced to retire with immediate effect due to injury. The regular season resumed on 22 August 2020, with the number of rounds reduced from 21 to 15 and any games postponed prior to the indefinite suspension of the season being deemed as 0–0 draws and both teams awarded two points. Rounds 14 and 15 took place as derbies in each territory, with the top two teams in each conference progressing to a semi-final stage.

Munster resumed their season on 22 August 2020 with a fixture against Leinster in the Aviva Stadium, which Leinster won 27–25. Munster handed debuts to new signings Damian de Allende and RG Snyman, though Snyman's first appearance for the province lasted only 7 minutes after he was injured during a lineout. Andrew Conway scored tries either side of Keith Earls' try, with JJ Hanrahan kicking 10 points off the tee, and Chris Farrell won the Man-of-the-Match award.

Munster completed their reduced 15 round Pro14 regular season with a seven try 49–12 win against Connacht, a victory that secured a semi-final against defending champions and provincial rivals Leinster on 4 September 2020. The tries came from Chris Cloete, Jeremy Loughman, Tadhg Beirne, James Cronin, two from Andrew Conway and a penalty try, with JJ Hanrahan kicking all five of his conversions and Rory Scannell converting the final try. As well as getting on the scoresheet, Tadhg Beirne also won the Man-of-the-Match award on his first game back after fracturing an ankle against Saracens in December 2019. Leinster won the semi-final 13–3, knocking Munster out at the semi-final stage of the Pro14 for the third season in a row.

Munster opened their 2020–21 Pro14 season with a 30–27 away win against Scarlets on 3 October 2020. Despite nine penalties from Scarlets fullback Leigh Halfpenny and a red card for captain Peter O'Mahony, tries from Jack O'Donoghue and Chris Farrell kept Munster within touching distance of the hosts, and a try from replacement hooker Kevin O'Byrne, converted by Ben Healy, levelled the score going into the final minutes of the game, before academy fly-half Healy scored a 50-metre penalty in the 81st minute to earn what had previously looked like an unlikely win for the province.

Munster's 2020–21 Champions Cup campaign commenced with a 21–7 home win against Harlequins on 13 December 2020, in which Gavin Coombes, Damian de Allende and Josh Wycherley made their tournament debuts. Coombes scored one try, with the other being a penalty try, with JJ Hanrahan and Ben Healy adding nine points of the kicking tee between them. Munster travelled away to Clermont for round two on 19 December 2020 and, despite trailing 28–9 to the home side at one point, fought back to earn a stunning 39–31 win at the Stade Marcel-Michelin. The tries for Munster came from Mike Haley, star-of-the-match CJ Stander and Kevin O'Byrne, with JJ Hanrahan scoring a perfect nine from nine off the kicking tee for the other 24 points.

In early January 2021, the EPCR took the decision to temporarily suspend rounds 3 and 4 of the 2020–21 Champions Cup, following a directive from authorities in France that French clubs should not participate in the scheduled matches in response to health risks posed by the COVID-19 pandemic.

Munster's 20–17 win against Connacht in round 14 of the 2020–21 Pro14 on 5 March 2021 saw them become the first team to qualify for 2021 Pro14 Grand Final, as the victory gave them an unassailable 12 point lead at the top of conference B with two rounds remaining. Munster were beaten 16–6 by arch-rivals Leinster in the 2021 Pro14 Grand Final on 27 March 2021.

The Champions Cup resumed on the weekend of 2/3/4 April 2021 with the top eight teams from each pool at the time of suspension progressing to the round of 16, where Munster had home advantage thanks to their wins in the opening games against Harlequins and Clermont. Munster were drawn against Toulouse.

In an enthralling encounter at Thomond Park, Munster led 16–9 at half-time thanks to two tries from Keith Earls and two penalties from Joey Carbery, but Toulouse pulled level thanks to a converted try from Matthis Lebel. Gavin Coombes scored from close-range to give Munster the lead again, before Toulouse captain Julien Marchand responded with a try to level the scores again at 23–23. Substitute fly-half JJ Hanrahan scored a penalty to give Munster a 26–23 lead heading into the final 15 minutes of the match, but Toulouse's talismanic scrum-half Antoine Dupont scored two tries in 9 minutes to help the French club pull away on the scoreboard. A late consolation try from Gavin Coombes, his second of the match, in overtime meant the final score was 40–33 to Toulouse, who became just the second French club to win a European match at Thomond Park and advanced to an away quarter-final against Munster's pool opponents Clermont.

Munster opened their 2021–22 United Rugby Championship campaign with a bonus-point 42–17 win against the Sharks, one of the four new South African teams, on 25 September 2021. Simon Zebo, making his return for the province, scored two tries, extending his club record to 62, with Gavin Coombes continuing his try-scoring exploits from the previous season with two tries of his own. Chris Cloete and player of the match Craig Casey also crossed the try line. Fly-half Joey Carbery scored seven points off the kicking tee, with his replacement Ben Healy contributing five points off the tee in the second-half. RG Snyman made his eagerly-awaited return from long-term injury as a second-half replacement, and scrum-half Rowan Osborne made his competitive debut for the province, in a match that saw fans return to Thomond Park for the first time since February 2020.

Munster were in South Africa for rounds 6 and 7 of the United Rugby Championship, in which they were due to play the Bulls and the Lions, however, the emergence of the omicron variant of COVID-19 led to travel restrictions being implemented by UK and EU authorities, meaning the fixtures had to be postponed. 34 players and staff arrived back in Ireland on 1 December 2021 and immediately entered 10 days of mandatory self-isolation. 14 players and staff who had tested positive for COVID-19 had to remain in South Africa.

In the wake of this disruption for Munster and other clubs, and with Munster's opening Champions Cup fixture away to Wasps falling on 12 December, the EPCR extended the deadline for registering players for the tournament to 8 December, meaning Munster could look to supplement their squad with short-term signings, and 22 players were subsequently registered with the province's Champions Cup squad.

A depleted Munster squad made up of internationals who'd been away with Ireland during the Autumn tests, academy players and members of the national and provincial talent squads travelled over to England to face Wasps on their opening Champions Cup fixture on 12 December 2021. The team, which featured 12 debutantes defeated their opponents 35–14 in front of a large contingent of Munster fans who had made the journey to Coventry.

Munster made it back-to-back wins in the Champions Cup with a gritty 19–13 win at home against French club Castres on 18 December 2021, with a 58th minute try from number 8 Jack O'Donoghue and 14 points off the tee from fly-half Ben Healy being enough for the province to see off their opposition.

In the reverse fixture against Castres in round 3 of the Champions Cup on 14 January 2022, Munster earned a 16–13 away win thanks to a 77th minute try from Gavin Coombes, converted by rookie fly-half Jack Crowley, who was faultless off the kicking tee in his first European start for the province. The win secured a place in the knockout stage of the tournament for Munster. Nine days later, Munster followed up their away win against Castres with a 45–7 home win against Wasps, with the tries coming from Jeremy Loughman, Conor Murray, Jack O'Donoghue, who was player of the match on the occasion of his 150th cap for Munster, Rory Scannell and Simon Zebo, who scored a brace to become Munster's all-time leading try-scorer in the Champions Cup and the leading Irish try-scorer in the competition overall. Fly-half Ben Healy and his replacement on the day, Jack Crowley, were both 100% from the kicking tee, with Healy scoring four conversions and a penalty, and Crowley adding two late conversions. The win secured home advantage for Munster in the second leg of the round of 16.

Munster faced English club Exeter Chiefs in the round of 16, and lost the first leg of the tie 13–8 away to the Premiership club on 9 April 2022. Exeter took a 10–0 lead in to half-time after tries from Stuart Hogg and Jacques Vermeulen, before Munster fly-half Ben Healy hit back with a penalty to reduce the home sides lead. Hogg responded for Exeter with a drop-goal, but a 66th minute try from Shane Daly brought Munster back within touching distance on the scoreboard, and Exeter had to withstand some intense offensive play from Munster going into the final ten minutes, with replacement scrum-half Craig Casey almost drawing the scores level, before the hosts themselves assaulted the Munster try-line in the last minutes of the match in an ultimately unsuccessful attempt to extend their lead.

Needing to overturn a five-point deficit to advance in the competition, Munster welcomed Exeter to Thomond Park for the second leg of their last 16 tie one week later. Fly-half Joey Carbery, returning from injury, opened the scoring for the hosts with a penalty, but the visitors responded with their first try of the game to take an early 5–3 lead, before Carbery struck back for Munster with a try of his own, to which he added a second penalty to give Munster a 13–5 half-time lead. Exeter struck first in the second-half with a try in the 47th minute, but Carbery kept Munster in front with two further penalties, before centre Damian de Allende scored a 74th minute try to secure a 26–10 home win for Munster and a 34–23 victory on aggregate, ensuring Munster progressed to a record 19th Champions Cup quarter-final.

Facing defending champions Toulouse, who knocked the province out of the previous season's tournament, in the quarter-final, Munster began strongly with an 11th minute Alex Kendellen try, converted by Joey Carbery to lead 7–0, but Romain Ntamack hit back for Toulouse two minutes later with a try of his own, converted by Thomas Ramos, to level the scores. The visitors were dominating the scrum and scored their second try in the 25th minute when Matthis Lebel touched down, with Ramos again converting to give Toulouse a 14–7 lead. However, Munster struck back with a Keith Earls try just before half-time which Carbery converted to leave the scores level heading into the break. The home side came out firing in the second-half, with Mike Haley scoring a 43rd minute try, again converted by Carbery, to give Munster a 21–14 lead, which Carbery extended with a penalty in the 56th minute, but Toulouse responded with Lebel's second try in the 66th minute which, when converted by Ramos, reduced the margin to just three points heading into the final ten minutes. A 75th-minute penalty from Ramos levelled the scores at 24–24, and that remained the score at full-time after Ben Healy missed with a 56-metre penalty attempt in the final minute of normal time.

With the scores level at full-time and as both teams scored three tries, extra time ensued, played over two ten-minute halves, but even after that the two teams could not be separated after three missed drop goals between the two, and the game went to a penalty shootout. Munster went first and Conor Murray scored his penalty. Antoine Dupont responded successfully for Toulouse, but Ben Healy missed his first attempt, and when Thomas Ramos scored his penalty, it was advantage Toulouse. Carbery scored his penalty, but Romain Ntamack scored his own to restore Toulouse's lead. Murray missed with his second attempt, whilst Dupont was successful with his own to give Toulouse a 4–2 lead, meaning Healy had to score with his second attempt to give Munster any hope, but he was unable to do so, and Toulouse advanced to the semi-finals, knocking Munster out of the competition for the second season in a row.

A 35–25 defeat away to Leinster in round 18 of the 2021–22 United Rugby Championship meant that Munster finished sixth in the league overall, and third in the Irish Shield, and the province headed north to face Ulster in the quarter-finals on 3 June 2022, but Munster lost 36–17 to bring the curtain down on their 2021–22 season, as well as Johann van Graan's tenure as head coach.

=== Graham Rowntree becomes head coach ===
Head coach Johann van Graan, who joined Munster in November 2017, confirmed in December 2021 that he would be leaving the province at the end of the 2021–22 season to join English club Bath. In addition to this, senior coach Stephen Larkham also left the province to return home to Australia to become head coach of the Brumbies, and defence coach JP Ferreira followed van Graan to join Bath. However, forwards coach Graham Rowntree extended his stay with the province by a further two years, and the province confirmed in April 2022 that Rowntree would be promoted to head coach from the 2022–23 season. Mike Prendergast, a former scrum-half for the province, joined Rowntree's coaching setup as the attack coach on a three-year contract, having most recently fulfilled a similar role for French club Racing 92. Andi Kyriacou, who had joined the province in April 2021 as an elite player development officer with the academy, was promoted to forwards coach with the senior squad on a two-year contract, and former Munster player Denis Leamy returned to the province as defence coach on a three-year contract.

After a poor start to the season, Munster won the 2022–23 United Rugby Championship after winning the quarter-final & semi-finals away from home before then beating defending champions the Stormers 19–14 also away from home in the final on 27 May 2023. In doing so, Munster ended a trophy drought that had lasted since their previous league title during the 2010–11 season, and secured the first silverware of Graham Rowntree's reign as head coach.

== Previous season summaries ==
	Domestic League				European Cup		Domestic / 'A' Cup	
Season	Competition	Final Position (Pool)	Points	Play-offs	Competition	Performance	Competition	Performance
1995–96	No competition				Heineken Cup	2nd in pool	Interprovincial Championship	3rd
1996–97	No competition				Heineken Cup	4th in pool	Interprovincial Championship	Champions
1997–98	No competition				Heineken Cup	4th in pool	Interprovincial Championship	2nd
1998–99	No competition				Heineken Cup	Quarter-final	Interprovincial Championship	Champions
1999–2000	No competition				Heineken Cup	Runner-up	Interprovincial Championship	Champions
2000–01	No competition				Heineken Cup	Semi-final	Interprovincial Championship	Champions
2001–02	Celtic League	1st (B)	15	Runner-up	Heineken Cup	Runner-up	Interprovincial Championship	3rd
2002–03	Celtic League	1st (A)	28	Champions	Heineken Cup	Semi-final	No competition	
2003–04	Celtic League	7th	51	N/A	Heineken Cup	Semi-final	Celtic Cup	Quarter-final
2004–05	Celtic League	2nd	69	N/A	Heineken Cup	Quarter-final	Celtic Cup	Champions
2005–06	Celtic League	3rd	66	N/A	Heineken Cup	Champions	No competition	
2006–07	Magners League	6th	54	N/A	Heineken Cup	Quarter-final	No competition	
2007–08	Magners League	3rd	48	N/A	Heineken Cup	Champions	No competition	
2008–09	Magners League	1st	63	N/A	Heineken Cup	Semi-final	No competition	
2009–10	Magners League	4th	45	Semi-final	Heineken Cup	Semi-final	British and Irish Cup	Runner-up
2010–11	Magners League	1st	83	Champions	Challenge Cup*	Semi-final	British and Irish Cup	3rd in pool
2011–12	RaboDirect PRO12	3rd	67	Semi-final	Heineken Cup	Quarter-final	British and Irish Cup	Champions
2012–13	RaboDirect PRO12	6th	54	Did not qualify	Heineken Cup	Semi-final	British and Irish Cup	Semi-final
2013–14	RaboDirect PRO12	3rd	74	Semi-final	Heineken Cup	Semi-final	British and Irish Cup	Quarter-final
2014–15	Guinness PRO12	2nd	75	Runner-up	Champions Cup	3rd in pool	British and Irish Cup	Quarter-final
2015–16	Guinness PRO12	6th	63	Did not qualify	Champions Cup	3rd in pool	British and Irish Cup	3rd in pool
2016–17	Guinness PRO12	1st	86	Runner-up	Champions Cup	Semi-final	British and Irish Cup	Champions
2017–18	Guinness PRO14	2nd (A)	69	Semi-final	Champions Cup	Semi-final	British and Irish Cup	Quarter-final
2018–19	Guinness PRO14	2nd (A)	77	Semi-final	Champions Cup	Semi-final	Celtic Cup	2nd in pool
2019–20	Guinness PRO14	2nd (B)	51	Semi-final	Champions Cup	3rd in pool	Celtic Cup	6th in pool
2020–21	Guinness PRO14	1st (B)	64	Runner-up	Champions Cup	Last 16	Rainbow Cup	2nd in pool
2021–22	URC	6th	56	Quarter-final	Champions Cup	Quarter-final	URC Irish Shield	3rd
2022–23	URC	5th	55	Champions	Champions Cup	Last 16	URC Irish Shield	3rd
2023–24	URC	1st	68	Semi-final	Champions Cup	Last 16	URC Irish Shield	3rd
2024–25	URC	6th	51	Quarter-final	Champions Cup	Quarter-final	URC Irish Shield	2nd

Gold background denotes champions
Silver background denotes runner-up

* After dropping into the competition from the Heineken Cup

== Season records ==
=== United Rugby Championship ===
Season	Pos	Played	Won	Drawn	Lost	Bonus	Points
2001–02	1st (Pool B)	6	5	0	1	0	15
2001–02	Quarter-final	Munster 13 – 6 Llanelli					
2001–02	Semi-final	Munster 15 – 9 Ulster					
2001–02	Final	Leinster 24 – 20 Munster					
2002–03	1st (Pool A)	7	6	0	1	4	28
2002–03	Quarter-final	Munster 33 – 3 Connacht					
2002–03	Semi-final	Munster 42 – 10 Ulster					
2002–03	Final	Neath 17 – 37 Munster					
2003–04	7th	22	10	0	12	11	51
2004–05	2nd	20	15	1	4	7	69
2005–06	3rd	20	12	0	8	10	66 (Note: 11 teams were involved in this season, so one team did not play each week and were awarded 4 points instead. Therefore, each team finished the season with 8 more points than the table would seem to warrant.)
2006–07	6th	20	12	0	8	6	54
2007–08	3rd	18	10	1	7	6	48
2008–09	1st	18	14	0	4	8	63
2009–10	4th	18	9	0	9	9	45
2009–10	Semi-final	Leinster 16 – 6 Munster					
2010–11	1st	22	19	0	3	7	83
2010–11	Semi-final	Munster 18 – 11 Ospreys					
2010–11	Final	Munster 19 – 9 Leinster					
2011–12	3rd	22	14	1	7	9	67
2011–12	Semi-final	Ospreys 45 – 10 Munster					
2012–13	6th	22	11	1	10	8	54
2013–14	3rd	22	16	0	6	10	74
2013–14	Semi-final	Glasgow 16 – 15 Munster					
2014–15	2nd	22	15	2	5	11	75
2014–15	Semi-final	Munster 21 – 18 Ospreys					
2014–15	Final	Munster 13 – 31 Glasgow					
2015–16	6th	22	13	0	9	11	63
2016–17	1st	22	19	0	3	10	86
2016–17	Semi-final	Munster 23 – 3 Ospreys					
2016–17	Final	Munster 22 – 46 Scarlets					
2017–18	2nd (Conf. A)	21	13	1	7	15	69
2017–18	Quarter-final	Munster 20 – 16 Edinburgh					
2017–18	Semi-final	Leinster 16 – 15 Munster					
2018–19	2nd (Conf. A)	21	16	0	5	13	77
2018–19	Quarter-final	Munster 15 – 13 Benetton					
2018–19	Semi-final	Leinster 24 – 9 Munster					
2019–20	2nd (Conf. B)	15	10	0	5	11	51 (Note: Regular season was reduced to 15 rounds due to COVID-19 pandemic.)
2019–20	Semi-final	Leinster 13 – 3 Munster					
2020–21	1st (Conf. B)	16	14	0	2	8	64 (Note: Regular season reduced to 16 rounds and a final due to Rainbow Cup.)
2020–21	Final	Leinster 16 – 6 Munster					
2021–22	6th	18	11	0	7	12	56
2021–22	Quarter-final	Ulster 36 – 17 Munster					
2022–23	5th	18	10	1	7	13	55
2022–23	Quarter-final	Glasgow Warriors 5 – 14 Munster					
2022–23	Semi-final	Leinster 15 – 16 Munster					
2022–23	Final	Stormers 14 – 19 Munster					
2023–24	1st	18	13	1	4	14	68
2023–24	Quarter-final	Munster 23 – 7 Ospreys					
2023–24	Semi-final	Munster 10 – 17 Glasgow Warriors					
2024–25	6th	18	9	0	9	15	51
2024–25	Quarter-final	Munster 24 – 24 Sharks (A.E.T.) (Note: Sharks won 6–4 on penalties.)					

=== European Rugby Champions Cup ===
Season	Pool/Round	Pos	Played	Won	Drawn	Lost	Bonus	Points
1995–96	Pool 4	2	2	1	0	1	–	2
1996–97	Pool 4	4	4	2	0	2	–	4
1997–98	Pool 4	4	6	2	0	4	–	4
1998–99	Pool 2	2	6	4	1	1	–	9
1998–99	Quarter-final	Colomiers 23 – 9 Munster						
1999–00	Pool 4	1	6	5	0	1	–	10
1999–00	Quarter-final	Munster 27 – 10 Stade Français Paris						
1999–00	Semi-final	Toulouse 25 – 31 Munster						
1999–00	Final	Northampton 9 – 8 Munster						
2000–01	Pool 4	1	6	5	0	1	–	10
2000–01	Quarter-final	Munster 38 – 29 Biarritz						
2000–01	Semi-final	Stade Français Paris 16 – 15 Munster						
2001–02	Pool 4	2	6	5	0	1	–	10
2001–02	Quarter-final	Stade Français Paris 14 – 16 Munster						
2001–02	Semi-final	Castres 17 – 25 Munster						
2001–02	Final	Leicester 15 – 9 Munster						
2002–03	Pool 2	2	6	4	0	2	–	8
2002–03	Quarter-final	Leicester 7 – 20 Munster						
2002–03	Semi-final	Toulouse 13 – 12 Munster						
2003–04	Pool 5	1	6	5	0	1	4	24
2003–04	Quarter-final	Munster 37 – 32 Stade Français Paris						
2003–04	Semi-final	Munster 32 – 37 Wasps						
2004–05	Pool 4	1	6	5	0	1	2	22
2004–05	Quarter-final	Biarritz 19 – 10 Munster						
2005–06	Pool 1	1	6	5	0	1	3	23
2005–06	Quarter-final	Munster 19 – 10 Perpignan						
2005–06	Semi-final	Leinster 6 – 30 Munster						
2005–06	Final	Biarritz 19 – 23 Munster						
2006–07	Pool 4	2	6	5	0	1	3	23
2006–07	Quarter-final	Scarlets 24 – 15 Munster						
2007–08	Pool 5	1	6	4	0	2	3	19
2007–08	Quarter-final	Gloucester 3 – 16 Munster						
2007–08	Semi-final	Saracens 16 – 18 Munster						
2007–08	Final	Toulouse 13 – 16 Munster						
2008–09	Pool 1	1	6	5	0	1	3	23
2008–09	Quarter-final	Munster 43 – 9 Ospreys						
2008–09	Semi-final	Munster 6 – 25 Leinster						
2009–10	Pool 1	1	6	5	0	1	4	24
2009–10	Quarter-final	Munster 33 – 19 Northampton						
2009–10	Semi-final	Biarritz 18 – 7 Munster						
2010–11	Pool 3	2	6	3	0	3	4	16
2011–12	Pool 1	1	6	6	0	0	1	25
2011–12	Quarter-final	Munster 16 – 22 Ulster						
2012–13	Pool 1	2	6	4	0	2	4	20
2012–13	Quarter-final	Harlequins 12 – 18 Munster						
2012–13	Semi-final	Clermont 16 – 10 Munster						
2013–14	Pool 6	1	6	5	0	1	3	23
2013–14	Quarter-final	Munster 47 – 23 Toulouse						
2013–14	Semi-final	Toulon 24 – 16 Munster						
2014–15	Pool 1	3	6	3	0	3	3	15
2015–16	Pool 4	3	6	3	0	3	3	15
2016–17	Pool 1	1	6	5	0	1	4	24
2016–17	Quarter-final	Munster 41 – 16 Toulouse						
2016–17	Semi-final	Munster 10 – 26 Saracens						
2017–18	Pool 4	1	6	4	1	1	3	21
2017–18	Quarter-final	Munster 20 – 19 Toulon						
2017–18	Semi-final	Racing 92 27 – 22 Munster						
2018–19	Pool 2	1	6	4	1	1	3	21
2018–19	Quarter-final	Edinburgh 13 – 17 Munster						
2018–19	Semi-final	Saracens 32 – 16 Munster						
2019–20	Pool 4	3	6	3	1	2	2	16
2020–21	Pool B	4	2	2	0	0	0	8 (Note: Final two pools games of revised 2020–21 tournament cancelled due to French government decision to prevent their teams from travelling abroad for fixtures due to COVID-19.)
2020–21	Last 16	Munster 33 – 40 Toulouse						
2021–22	Pool B	3	4	4	0	0	2	18
2021–22	Last 16 (1st leg)	Exeter Chiefs 13 – 8 Munster						
2021–22	Last 16 (2nd leg)	Munster 26 – 10 Exeter Chiefs (Note: Munster won 34–23 on aggregate.)						
2021–22	Quarter-final	Munster 24 – 24 Toulouse (A.E.T.) (Note: Toulouse won 4–2 on penalties.)						
2022–23	Pool B	6	4	2	0	2	2	10
2022–23	Last 16	Sharks 50 – 35 Munster						
2023–24	Pool C	4	6	1	1	2	3	9
2023–24	Last 16	Northampton Saints 24 – 14 Munster						
2024–25	Pool 3	3	4	2	0	2	4	12
2024–25	Last 16	Stade Rochelais 24 – 25 Munster						
2024–25	Quarter-final	Union Bordeaux Bègles 47 – 29 Munster						

=== European Rugby Challenge Cup ===
Season	Round	Result
2010–11	Quarter-final	Brive 37 – 42 Munster
2010–11	Semi-final	Munster 12 – 20 Harlequins

== Current standings ==
=== United Rugby Championship ===
Pos	Team	Pld	W	D	L	PF	PA	PD	TF	TA	TB	LB	Pts	Qualification
1	Leinster (C)	18	16	0	2	542	256	+286	79	35	11	1	76	Qualifies for home URC quarter-final; Qualification for the 2025–26 Champions Cup
2	Bulls (RU)	18	14	0	4	542	361	+181	71	44	9	3	68	Qualifies for home URC quarter-final; Qualification for the 2025–26 Champions Cup
3	Sharks (SF)	18	13	0	5	436	402	+34	55	59	7	3	62	Qualifies for home URC quarter-final; Qualification for the 2025–26 Champions Cup
4	Glasgow Warriors (SF)	18	11	0	7	468	327	+141	70	40	10	5	59	Qualifies for home URC quarter-final; Qualification for the 2025–26 Champions Cup
5	Stormers (Q)	18	10	0	8	507	418	+89	66	57	11	4	55	Qualifies for URC quarter-final; Qualification for the 2025–26 Champions Cup
6	Munster (Q)	18	9	0	9	444	429	+15	67	59	11	4	51	Qualifies for URC quarter-final; Qualification for the 2025–26 Champions Cup
7	Edinburgh (Q)	18	8	1	9	471	407	+64	66	57	9	6	49	Qualifies for URC quarter-final; Qualification for the 2025–26 Champions Cup
8	Scarlets (Q)	18	9	1	8	427	382	+45	50	52	6	4	48	Qualifies for URC quarter-final; Qualification for the 2025–26 Champions Cup
9	Cardiff (E)	18	8	1	9	409	477	−68	63	65	10	3	47	Qualification for the 2025–26 Challenge Cup
10	Benetton (E)	18	9	1	8	393	478	−85	50	65	7	1	46	Qualification for the 2025–26 Challenge Cup
11	Lions (E)	18	8	0	10	402	440	−38	53	60	5	3	40	Qualification for the 2025–26 Challenge Cup
12	Ospreys (E)	18	7	1	10	437	454	−17	60	63	6	4	40	Qualification for the 2025–26 Challenge Cup
13	Connacht (E)	18	6	0	12	420	472	−52	64	62	9	6	39	Qualification for the 2025–26 Challenge Cup
14	Ulster (E)	18	7	0	11	414	506	−92	59	72	5	5	38	Qualification for the 2025–26 Challenge Cup
15	Zebre Parma (E)	18	5	1	12	302	503	−201	38	72	3	4	29	Qualification for the 2025–26 Challenge Cup
16	Dragons (E)	18	1	0	17	335	637	−302	43	92	1	4	9	Qualification for the 2025–26 Challenge Cup

Updated to match(es) played on 4 June 2025. Source: UnitedRugby.com
Rules for classification: Tiebreakers for teams tied on points: 1) Number of matches won 2) The difference between points for and points against 3) The number of tries scored 4) The most points scored 5) The difference between tries for and tries against 6) The fewest red cards received 7) The fewest yellow cards received.

2024–25 United Rugby Championship Regional Shield Pools
(Ireland) Irish Shield
	Team	P	W	D	L	PF	PA	PD	TF	TA	TBP	LBP	Pts	Pos overall
1	(Ireland) Leinster (S)	6	6	0	0	175	80	+95	26	11	5	0	29	1
2	(Ireland) Munster	6	4	0	2	144	150	–6	22	22	4	0	20	6
3	(Ireland) Ulster	6	2	0	4	125	162	–37	16	26	1	2	11	14
4	(Ireland) Connacht	6	0	0	6	115	167	–52	18	23	3	3	6	13
(Italy) (Scotland) Italian x Scottish Shield
	Team	P	W	D	L	PF	PA	PD	TF	TA	TBP	LBP	Pts	Pos overall
1	(Scotland) Glasgow Warriors (S)	6	4	0	2	136	76	+60	20	9	3	1	20	4
2	(Italy) Benetton	6	4	0	2	132	139	–7	19	19	3	0	19	10
3	(Scotland) Edinburgh	6	2	1	3	134	141	–7	18	20	1	2	13	7
4	(Italy) Zebre Parma	6	1	1	4	88	124	–46	9	18	0	1	7	15
(South Africa) South African Shield
	Team	P	W	D	L	PF	PA	PD	TF	TA	TBP	LBP	Pts	Pos overall
1	(South Africa) Sharks (S)	6	4	0	2	129	135	−6	17	20	2	1	19	3
2	(South Africa) Stormers	6	3	0	3	142	130	+12	19	15	3	3	18	5
3	(South Africa) Bulls	6	3	0	3	151	141	+10	19	17	3	2	17	2
4	(South Africa) Lions	6	2	0	4	141	157	−16	19	22	1	1	10	11
(Wales) Welsh Shield
	Team	P	W	D	L	PF	PA	PD	TF	TA	TBP	LBP	Pts	Pos overall
1	(Wales) Cardiff (S)	6	4	1	1	147	117	+30	23	14	4	1	23	9
2	(Wales) Scarlets	6	4	0	2	163	126	+37	20	18	3	1	20	7
3	(Wales) Ospreys	6	2	1	3	155	156	–1	21	20	1	1	12	12
4	(Wales) Dragons	6	1	0	5	130	196	–66	15	27	0	1	5	16
If teams are level at any stage, tiebreakers are applied in the following order: 1. number of matches won 2. the difference between points for and points against 3. the number of tries scored 4. the most points scored 5. the difference between tries for and tries against 6. the fewest red cards received 7. the fewest yellow cards received
Green background indicates teams currently leading the regional shield. Upon the conclusion of the regular season, these teams win their respective regional shields. (S) : URC Shield champion

=== European Rugby Champions Cup ===
2023–24 European Rugby Champions Cup Pool C
Team	P	W	D	L	PF	PA	Diff	TF	TA	TB	LB	Pts
(England) Northampton Saints (3)	4	4	0	0	137	75	+62	18	10	2	0	18
(England) Exeter Chiefs (8)	4	3	0	1	87	99	–12	13	14	1	0	13
(Scotland) Glasgow Warriors (12)	4	2	0	2	77	63	+14	12	8	1	1	10
(Ireland) Munster (14)	4	1	1	2	93	93	0	13	10	2	1	9
(France) Bayonne (9CC)	4	1	1	2	82	107	–25	11	16	1	1	8
(France) Toulon	4	0	0	4	60	99	–39	7	16	0	2	2
Green background (rows 1 to 2) indicates qualification places for a home Champions Cup round of 16. Blue background (rows 3 to 4) indicates other teams qualified for the Champions Cup round of 16. Yellow background (row 5) indicates qualification place for the Challenge Cup round of 16. Plain background (row 6) indicates elimination from 2023–24 European competition. Starting table — source: European Professional Club Rugby

== Honours ==
Honours
Competition	Winners	Season(s)	Runners-up	Season(s)
European Rugby Champions Cup (Note: Formerly known as Heineken Cup)	2	2005–06, 2007–08	2	1999–2000, 2001–02
United Rugby Championship (Note: Formerly known as Celtic League/Magners League/Pro12/Pro14)	4	2002–03, 2008–09, 2010–11, 2022–23	5	2001–02, 2004–05, 2014–15, 2016–17, 2020–21
British & Irish Cup (Note: Contested from 2009 to 2018)	2	2011–12, 2016–17	1	2009–10
Celtic Cup (Note: Contested from 2003 to 2005)	1	2004–05	——	——
IRFU Interprovincial Championship (Note: Contested from 1946 to 2002 – Bold indicates Grand Slam; * indicates shared title; years shown are season ending years)	22	1947–48, 1952–53, 1954–55, 1957–58, 1959–60, 1962–63, 1965–66, 1966–67*, 1968–69, 1972–73*, 1973–74, 1975–76*, 1977–78*, 1978–79, 1982–83*, 1987–88*, 1993–94*, 1994–95, 1996–97, 1998–99, 1999–2000, 2000–01	N/A	N/A
Setanta Challenge Cup (Note: Contested from 2007 to 2008)	2	2007, 2008	——	——

== Colours and crest ==
Flag of the province of Munster

The 'three crowns' flag of Munster Rugby derives from the historic coat of arms of Munster, which reputedly alludes to the three constituent historic kingdoms of Munster; Thomond in the north, Desmond in the south, and Ormond in the east.

A revamped logo was introduced for the 2003–04 season which included the addition of a stag with the three crowns. The new crest was designed by the Limerick graphic design and branding agency Designer's Ink, who received a Gold Award in the Irish Design Effectiveness Awards for the branding and implementation of Munster Rugby. The crest was designed to maintain the three crowns and the new red stag symbolises strength and competitiveness. The decision for change was a product of two years of planning of research and design.

Munster's kit is made by Adidas, who replaced Canterbury in 2007 in a deal initially covering kit supply for three seasons. Between 2004 and 2013, Toyota was Munster's primary sponsor, appearing on the front of their jersey. On 23 May 2013, it was announced on that Bank of Ireland would be replacing Toyota as Munster's sponsor. In April 2017, the deal with Bank of Ireland was extended until the end of the 2022–23 season. In August 2017, Munster announced that Shannon Airport had become its 'official airport partner' in a three-year deal, which would see the Shannon Airport logo appear on the players' shorts from the 2017–18 season onwards. The deals with kit manufacturer Adidas and retail partner LifeStyle Sports were extended in July 2019 until the end of the 2025–26 season.

== Home grounds ==
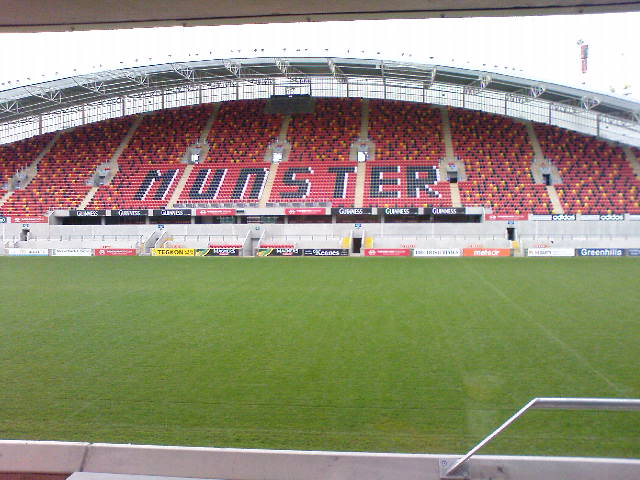
Thomond Park

Munster have two main stadia where they play their home matches – Thomond Park in Limerick and Musgrave Park in Cork. Thomond Park is the bigger of the two, with a capacity of 25,600, which can be expanded up to 26,267 with temporary seating, while Musgrave Park holds 8,800. As well as Munster, Shannon and UL Bohemians play at the grounds of Thomond Park. Thomond Park is famous for its atmosphere and unique history – its noise during play and complete silence when a player (home or away) is kicking at goal. It was also famous for Munster's intimidating record that it held for over a decade – having never been beaten at home during the Heineken Cup. However, the record was broken during the 2006–07 season when they were defeated by Leicester Tigers. Munster train in the University of Limerick.

Thomond Park went through a major renovation in 1999 and in 2006, Munster announced plans to upgrade it. In autumn 2008, the new 25,600 capacity stadium was opened. Two sweeping arches are one of the defining features of the stadium, as well as the concourse outside of the new East Stand. The new stadium design was well received and won the Public Choice Award for 2009 from the Irish Architecture Foundation. A long discussion and consultation on the new name concluded with the decision that the name would remain Thomond Park.

== Supporters ==
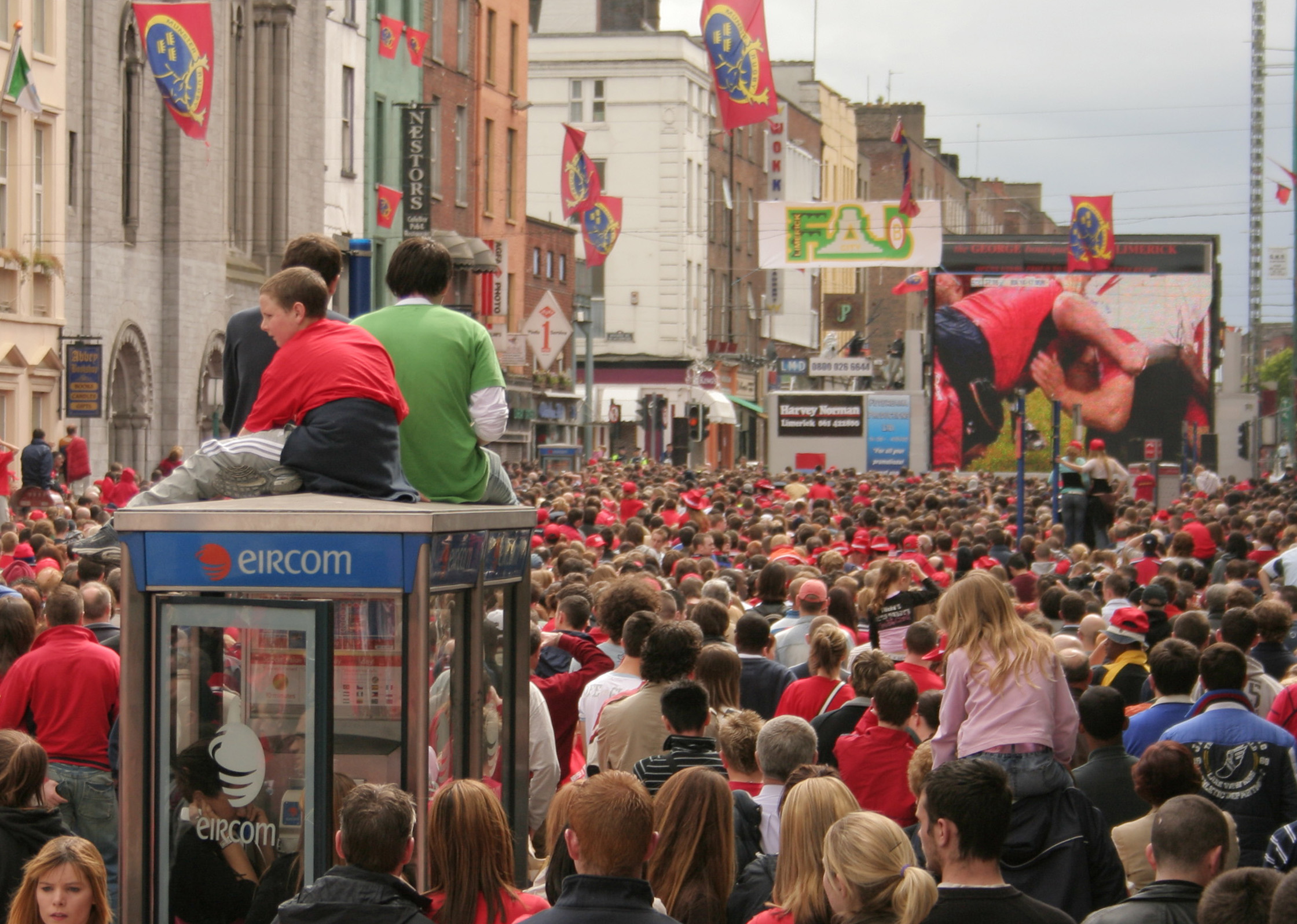
Thousands of fans watch the 2006 Heineken Cup Final in Limerick.

The Munster Rugby Supporters Club was founded in 1999 and has branches in Brussels, Dublin, London and the United States. The strength of Munster's support was demonstrated during Munster's 2006 and 2008 Heineken Cup final wins. News reports detailed the lengths that fans were willing to go to secure tickets to the game, with some Munster fans travelling to Biarritz to buy up the French allocation of tickets. On the day of the game the Millennium Stadium in Cardiff was filled with a capacity crowd of 74,500. Of those numbers it is estimated that somewhere between 55,000 and 65,000 were Munster fans with the remainder being neutrals and Biarritz supporters. The Millennium Stadium was intended to be a neutral venue but commentators on the day remarked that it could hardly be counted as such.

Munster played in the most attended semi-final match of the Heineken Cup. 82,208 spectators attended their 2008–09 Heineken Cup semi-final against Irish rivals Leinster, which was played in Croke Park, Dublin. This was also, at the time, the largest crowd ever at a club rugby union match. The record was broken in a league game between English sides Saracens and Harlequins in 2012.

Munster's appearance in the 2002 final of the Heineken Cup against Leicester Tigers at the Millennium Stadium, which drew 74,600, was the record attendance for a final in the competition until the 2007 Heineken Cup final between Leicester and London Wasps at the newly expanded Twickenham. Munster's 2005 quarter-final against Biarritz Olympique in Estadio Anoeta, played across the border in Spain in San Sebastián set the record for the biggest rugby match ever played in Spain with an attendance of 32,000. Their October 2006 Celtic League game against Leinster at Lansdowne Road beat the record for that competition with an attendance of 27,252. This record lasted just two months however, with the Leinster and Ulster match on 31 December 2006 filling Lansdowne Road (over 48,000 in attendance) for the last match at the stadium before redevelopment.

On 2 October 2010, Munster played Leinster in the round 5 of the Celtic League at the Aviva Stadium, this set a new crowd attendance record for a Celtic League game at 50,645. On 26 December 2017, a new attendance record for Thomond Park in the Pro14 was set when 26,267 were at the Munster v Leinster fixture.

Munster fans are known for their silence when a kick is being taken, but also for their noise. Fans repeatedly chant "MUNSTER" or sing "The Fields of Athenry" (an Irish famine song from Galway, Connacht) and "Stand Up and Fight" (from the Broadway musical Carmen Jones). They sang "The Black Velvet Band" to the Ospreys' Irish winger Tommy Bowe during their 2009 Heineken Cup quarter-final encounter. Tommy Bowe sang this song at the official reception for the 2009 Grand Slam winning Ireland rugby team. Munster Rugby has given the word "Garryowen" to the rugby lexicon. The Limerick club of Garryowen introduced the "Garryowen kick", a high up-and-under which puts defending players under pressure. Shortly after the 2018 death of Dolores O'Riordan, lead singer of The Cranberries (a band formed in Limerick), Munster fans adopted the band's song "Zombie" as an unofficial anthem. The song's status was further cemented during the 2021–22 season, with the hit single featuring prominently in Munster's defeat against Toulouse in May 2022 and in their win against a South Africa XV in Páirc Uí Chaoimh in November 2022.

== Munster A ==
Munster A is the team that represents Munster in the Celtic Cup and in the IRFU Interprovincial Championship. Before the professional era and a formal league structure, the main Munster team competed in the IRFU Interprovincial Championship. The team is composed of senior Munster squad players requiring gametime, academy players and All-Ireland League players called up from their club.

Having been beaten finalists in the 2009–10 British and Irish Cup, losing 23–14 to Cornish Pirates, Munster A secured success in the British and Irish Cup on 27 April 2012, beating Cross Keys 31–12 in the final of the 2011–12 tournament at Musgrave Park. On 21 April 2017, Munster A won their second British and Irish Cup, beating English RFU Championship side Jersey Reds 29–28 in the 2016–17 final, which was held in Musgrave Park. At one point during the first half, Munster A had been losing 18–0, but fought back to secure victory.

With 2017–18 being the last season in which the British and Irish Cup was held, the Welsh Rugby Union and Irish Rugby Football Union formed a new tournament, the Celtic Cup, which features development squads from the four Irish provinces and four Welsh regions, split into two pools of four. The first tournament ran over seven consecutive weeks between 7 September 2018 and 21 October 2018.

== Current Squads ==
=== Munster Men Coaches and Management ===
Position	Name	Nationality
Head coach	Clayton McMillan	New Zealand
Attack coach	Jared Payne	Ireland
Forwards coach	Jimmy Duffy	Ireland
Defence coach	Denis Leamy	Ireland
Skills coach	Mossy Lawler	Ireland
Performance analyst and technical coach	George Murray	Ireland
Team Manager	Martyn Vercoe	New Zealand
Head of rugby operations	Ian Costello	Ireland
Head of athletic performance	Brad Mayo	New Zealand
Strength and conditioning coach	Adam Sheehan	Ireland

=== Munster Men Squad ===
2026–27 Munster Men squad
**Props**: (Samoa) **Michael Alaalatoa**; (Ireland) **Jack Aungier**; (England) **Kieran Brookes***; (Ireland) Mark Donnelly; (Ireland) Ronan Foxe; (Ireland) **Jeremy Loughman**; (Ireland) **Michael Milne**; (Ireland) Kieran Ryan; (Ireland) Josh Wycherley; **Hookers**: (Ireland) Diarmuid Barron; (Ireland) Lee Barron; (Ireland) Max Clein; (South Africa) **Marnus van der Merwe**; **Locks**: (Ireland) **Thomas Ahern**; (Ireland) **Tadhg Beirne** **(c)**; (Ireland) **Edwin Edogbo**; (Ireland) Evan O'Connell; (Ireland) Conor Ryan; (Ireland) **Fineen Wycherley**	**Back row**: (Ireland) **Gavin Coombes**; (Ireland) Sean Edogbo; (Ireland) Brian Gleeson; (Ireland) John Hodnett; (Ireland) **Alex Kendellen**; (Ireland) **Jack O'Donoghue**; (Ireland) Ruadhán Quinn; **Scrum-halves**: (Ireland) **Craig Casey**; (Ireland) Ethan Coughlan; (New Zealand) Ben O'Donovan *; **Fly-halves**: (Ireland) **Jack Crowley**; (Ireland) JJ Hanrahan; (Australia) **Will Harrison**	**Centres**: (Ireland) **Tom Farrell**; (Ireland) Dan Kelly; (New Zealand) Alex Nankivell; (Ireland) Seán O'Brien; **Back three**: (Ireland) **Shane Daly**; (Ireland) **Mike Haley**; (Ireland) Diarmuid Kilgallen; (Ireland) Shay McCarthy; (Ireland) **Calvin Nash**; (Ireland) Ben O'Connor; (Ireland) Rob Russell ^{ST}
**(c)** denotes the team captain. **Bold** denotes internationally capped players. * denotes players qualified to play for Ireland on residency or dual nationality.^{ST} denotes a short-term signing. Taking into account signings and departures ahead of 2026–27 season as listed on List of 2026–27 United Rugby Championship transfers. Source:

=== Munster Men Academy Coaches and Management ===
Position	Name	Nationality
Academy and pathway manager	Gearóid Prendergast	Ireland
Elite player development officer	Brendan O'Connor	Ireland
Elite player development officer	Tommy O'Donnell	Ireland
Pathway development coach	Matt Brown	Ireland
National talent coach	Mark Butler	Ireland
Strength and conditioning coach	Danielle Cunningham	Ireland

=== Munster Men Academy Squad ===
2026-27 Munster Men Academy squad (19 Members with Year stages)
**Props**: (Ireland) Emmett Calvey (2); (Ireland) Christian Foley (1); (Ireland) Darragh O'Connell (1); (Ireland) Jamie Conway (1); **Hookers**: (Ireland) Danny Sheahan (3); **Locks**: (Ireland) Michael Foy (3); (Ireland) Conor Kennelly (2); (Ireland) Joe Finn (1)	**Back row**: (Ireland) Luke Murphy (3); (Ireland) Oisin Minogue (2); (Ireland) Alex Lautsou (1); **Scrum-halves**: (Ireland) Jake O'Riordan (3); (Ireland) Christopher Barrett (1); **Fly-halves**: (Ireland) Tom Wood (2); (Ireland) Charlie O'Shea (1)	**Centres**: (Ireland) Gordon Wood (3); (Ireland) Eoghan Smyth (2); (Ireland) James O'Leary (1); (Ireland) Rob Carney (1); **Back three**
**(c)** denotes the team captain. **Bold** denotes internationally capped players. * denotes players qualified to play for Ireland on residency or dual nationality. Taking into account signings and departures ahead of 2026-27 season as listed on List of 2026-27 United Rugby Championship transfers. Source:

=== Munster Women ===
2026/27 Munster Women Squad (23 Players)
**Props**: (Ireland) Eilís Cahill; (Ireland) Siobhán McCarthy; (Ireland) Tuathla Ryan; **Hookers**: (Ireland) Beth Buttimer; (Ireland) Emma Duncan; **Locks**: (Ireland) Claire Bennett; (Ireland) Aoibhe O'Flynn; (Ireland) Clodagh O'Halloran	**Back Row**: (Ireland) Jane Clohessy; (Ireland) Annakate Cournane; (Ireland) Sally Kelly; (Ireland) Grace Moore; (Ireland) Maeve Óg O'Leary; **Scrum-halves**: (Ireland) Emily Lane; (Ireland) Abbie Salter-Townshend; **Fly-halves**: (Ireland) Enya Breen; (Ireland) Catriona Finn; (Ireland) Kate Flannery	**Centres**: (Ireland) Lucia Linn; (Ireland) Alana McInerney; **Back Three**: (Ireland) Ellen Boylan; (Ireland) Aoife Corey; (Ireland) Chisom Ugwueru
Players listed in **Bold** have represented their country internationally in Rugby Union or Sevens. *Denotes Devolepment Player|}

== Results against touring international teams ==
Date	Country	Location	Score	Result
1905	New Zealand	Markets Field	0–33	Lost
1947	Australia	The Mardkye	5–6	Lost
1951	South Africa	Thomond Park	6–11	Lost
1954	New Zealand	The Mardyke	3–6	Lost
1958	Australia	Thomond Park	3–3	Draw
1960	South Africa	Musgrave Park	3–9	Lost
1962	Canada	Musgrave Park	11–8	Won
1963	New Zealand	Thomond Park	3–6	Lost
1967	Australia	Musgrave Park	11–8	Won
1970	South Africa	Thomond Park	9–25	Lost
1973	New Zealand	Musgrave Park	3–3	Drew
1973	Argentina	Thomond Park	12–12	Drew
1974	New Zealand	Thomond Park	4–14	Lost
1976	Australia	Musgrave Park	13–15	Lost
1978	New Zealand	Thomond Park	12–0	Won
1980	Romania	Thomond Park	9–32	Lost
1981	Australia	Musgrave Park	15–6	Won
1984	Australia	Thomond Park	19–31	Lost
1989	New Zealand	Musgrave Park	9–31	Lost
1990	(Soviet Union) USSR	Clonmel	15–19	Lost
1992	Australia	Musgrave Park	22–19	Won
1996	Samoa	Musgrave Park	25–35	Lost
1996	Australia	Thomond Park	19–55	Lost
1998	Morocco	Thomond Park	49–17	Won
2008	New Zealand	Thomond Park	16–18	Lost
2010	Australia	Thomond Park	15–6	Won
2016	(New Zealand) Māori All Blacks	Thomond Park	27–14	Won
2022	South Africa XV	Páirc Uí Chaoimh	28–14	Won
2023	Barbarians	Thomond Park	47–35	Won
2024	(New Zealand) All Blacks XV	Thomond Park	24–38	Lost
2025	Argentina XV	Thomond Park	31-28	Won

== Record against United Rugby Championship and European Cup opponents ==
Against	Played†	Won	Drawn	Lost	% Won
(Italy) Aironi	4	3	0	1	75.00%
(England) Bath	3	1	0	2	33.33%
(France) Bayonne	1	1	0	0	100.00%
(Italy) Benetton	30	26	1	3	86.67%
(France) Biarritz	4	2	0	2	50.00%
(Scotland) Border Reivers	8	8	0	0	100.00%
(France) Bourgoin	6	5	0	1	83.33%
(Wales) Bridgend	2	2	0	0	100.00%
(France) Brive	1	1	0	0	100.00%
(South Africa) Bulls	5	2	0	3	40%
(Wales) Caerphilly	2	2	0	0	100.00%
(France) Castres	20	13	1	6	65%
(Wales) Cardiff	47	29	0	18	61.7%
(Wales) Celtic Warriors	2	1	0	1	50.00%
(South Africa) Cheetahs	5	4	0	1	80.00%
(France) Clermont	8	3	0	5	37.50%
(France) Colomiers	3	2	0	1	66.67%
(Ireland) Connacht	48	38	1	9	79.17%
(Wales) Dragons	39	30	0	9	76.92%
(Wales) Ebbw Vale	1	1	0	0	100.00%
(Scotland) Edinburgh	45	35	0	10	77.78%
(England) Exeter Chiefs	6	2	3	1	33.33%
(Scotland) Glasgow Warriors	44	25	1	18	56.82%
(England) Gloucester	10	8	0	2	80.00%
(England) Harlequins	9	7	0	2	77.77%
(Wales) Llanelli	2	2	0	0	100.00%
(England) Leicester Tigers	10	5	0	5	50.00%
(Ireland) Leinster	58	19	1	38	32.76%
(South Africa) Lions	4	3	0	1	75.00%
(England) London Irish	2	1	0	1	50.00%
(Italy) Milan	1	1	0	0	100.00%
(France) Montauban	2	2	0	0	100.00%
(Wales) Neath	5	3	1	1	60.00%
(Wales) Newport	3	3	0	0	100.00%
(England) Northampton Saints	11	6	0	5	54.55%
(Wales) Ospreys	51	33	1	17	64.71%
(France) Perpignan	9	7	0	2	77.78%
(Italy) Petrarca	2	2	0	0	100.00%
(Wales) Pontypridd	2	1	0	1	50.00%
(France) Racing 92	9	4	1	4	44.44%
(England) Sale Sharks	6	5	0	1	83.33%
(England) Saracens	12	7	0	5	58.33%
(Wales) Scarlets	47	32	2	13	68.09%
(South Africa) Sharks	7	2	1	4	28.57%
(South Africa) Southern Kings	4	4	0	0	100.00%
(France) Stade Français Paris	7	5	0	2	71.43%
(France) Stade Rochelais	1	1	0	0	100%
(South Africa) Stormers	6	4	0	2	66.67%
(Wales) Swansea	2	2	0	0	100.00%
(France) Toulon	6	3	0	3	50.00%
(France) Toulouse	10	4	0	6	40.00%
(Ireland) Ulster	49	25	2	22	51.02%
(Italy) Viadana	2	2	0	0	100.00%
(England) Wasps	6	4	0	2	66.66%
(Italy) Zebre Parma	22	21	0	1	95.45%
Total	711	464	16	231	65.26%

†Matches played as part of the Irish Inter-provincial Rugby Championship, separate from league fixtures, are not included in this table.
Correct as of 20 April 2026

== Records against Irish Provinces (1946–present) ==
Against	Played	Won	Drawn	Lost	% Won
Connacht	106	90	3	13	84.91%
Leinster	116	46	5	65	39.66%
Ulster	109	43	10	56	39.45%
Total	330	179	18	133	54.24%

Correct as of 3 February 2026.

== Head coaches (professional era) ==
Correct as of 1 November 2026

Coach	Season(s)	Games	Won	Drew	Lost	Win %	Loss %	Honours
(Ireland) Jerry Holland	1994/95 – 1996/97	19	12	0	7	63%	37%	IRFU Interprovincial Championship: 1994–95, 1996–97
(Wales) John Bevan	1997/98	9	4	0	5	44%	56%	
(Ireland) Declan Kidney	1998/99 – 2002/03	80	60	3	17	75%	21%	IRFU Interprovincial Championship: 1998–99, 1999–2000, 2000–01; Celtic League (2002–03)
(Australia) Alan Gaffney	2003/04 – 2004/05	61	40	0	21	66%	34%	Celtic Cup (2005)
(Ireland) Declan Kidney	2005/06 – 2007/08	84	54	1	29	64%	35%	European Cup (2006), (2008)
(Australia) Tony McGahan	2008/09 – 2011/12	115	79	1	35	69%	30%	Magners League (2009), (2011)
(New Zealand) Rob Penney	2012/13 – 2013/14	61	38	1	22	62%	36%	2013–14 Pro12 Coach of the Season
(Ireland) Anthony Foley	2014/15 – 2016/17 (Note: Anthony Foley died suddenly on 16 October 2016, just 6 games into Munster's regular season. Figures for Rassie Erasmus, who became Munster's director of rugby on 1 July 2016, include those games in which Foley was still head coach.)	64	39	2	23	61%	36%	
(South Africa) Rassie Erasmus	2016/17 – 2017/18	43	33	1	9	77%	21%	2016–17 Pro12 Coach of the Season
(South Africa) Johann van Graan	2017/18 – 2021/22	125	84	3	38	67%	30%	
(England) Graham Rowntree	2022/23 – 2024/25 (midseason)	55	32	3	20	58%	36%	URC (2022–23)
(Ireland) Ian Costello	2024/25 (midseason)	18	10	0	8	56%	44%	
(New Zealand) Clayton McMillan	2025/2026–	31	15	1	15	48%	48%	

== Notable players ==
=== British & Irish Lions ===
The following Munster players have represented the British & Irish Lions. Bold indicates tour captain.

Year	Tour	Series Result	Players
1888	New Zealand; Australia	No tests	——
1891	South Africa	3–0	——
1896	South Africa	3–1	——
1899	Australia	3–1	——
1903	South Africa	0–1–0	——
1904	Australia; New Zealand	3–0; 0–1	——
1908	New Zealand; Australia	0–2–1; No tests	——
1910	South Africa	1–2	William Joseph Ashby; Oliver Piper
1910	Argentina	1–0	——
1924	South Africa	0–3–1	Michael Bradley; William Roche
1927	Argentina	4–0	——
1930	(New Zealand) New Zealand; Australia	1–3; 0–1	——
1936	Argentina	1–0	——
1938	South Africa	1–2	——
1950	New Zealand; Australia	0–3–1; 2–0	Tom Clifford; Mick Lane; Jim McCarthy
1955	South Africa	2–2	Tom Reid
1959	Australia; New Zealand	2–0; 1–3	Mick English; Noel Murphy; Gordon Wood
1962	South Africa	0–3–1	Tom Kiernan
1966	Australia; New Zealand	2–0; 0–4	Barry Bresnihan; Noel Murphy (2); Jerry Walsh
1968	South Africa	0–3–1	Barry Bresnihan (2); Mick Doyle; Tom Kiernan (2)
1971	New Zealand	2–1–1	——
1974	South Africa	3–0–1	Moss Keane
1977	New Zealand	1–3	Moss Keane (2)
1980	South Africa	1–3	Colm Tucker; Tony Ward
1983	New Zealand	0–4	Mike Kiernan; Donal Lenihan; Gerry McLoughlin
1989	Australia	2–1	Donal Lenihan (2)
1993	New Zealand	1–2	Mick Galwey; Richard Wallace
1997	South Africa	2–1	Keith Wood
2001	Australia	1–2	Rob Henderson; Ronan O'Gara; David Wallace; Keith Wood (2)
2005	New Zealand	0–3	John Hayes; Donncha O'Callaghan; Paul O'Connell; Ronan O'Gara (2)
2009	South Africa	1–2	Keith Earls; John Hayes (2); Donncha O'Callaghan (2); **Paul O'Connell** (2); Ronan O'Gara (3); David Wallace (2)
2013	Australia	2–1	Conor Murray; Paul O'Connell (3); Simon Zebo
2017	New Zealand	1–1–1	Conor Murray (2); Peter O'Mahony; CJ Stander
2021	South Africa	1–2	Tadhg Beirne; Conor Murray (3)
2025	Australia	–	Tadhg Beirne (2)

=== The '200' Club ===
The following table shows the players who won at least 200 caps for Munster. All players are Irish, unless otherwise noted.
(Correct as of 19 October 2025)

Player	Caps	Years
Stephen Archer	304	2009–2025
Donncha O'Callaghan	268	1998–2015
Billy Holland	247	2007–2021
**John Ryan**	245	2011–
Ronan O'Gara	240	1997–2013
Peter Stringer	232	1998–2013
Marcus Horan	225	1999–2013
Dave Kilcoyne	220	2011–2024
John Hayes	217	1998–2011
Alan Quinlan	212	1996–2011
Mick O'Driscoll	207	1998–2003, 2005–2012
Conor Murray	206	2010–2025
David Wallace	203	1997–2012
Keith Earls	202	2007–2023
Anthony Foley	201	1994–2008
Rory Scannell	200	2014–2025

=== End-of-season awards ===
Season	Player of the Year	Young Player of the Year	Academy Player of the Year	Hall of Fame
2004–05	——	——	Tomás O'Leary	——
2005–06	——	——	Ross Noonan	——
2006–07	John Hayes	Darragh Hurley	Keith Earls	Tom Kiernan
2007–08	Ronan O'Gara	Denis Hurley	Billy Holland	Paddy Reid
2008–09	David Wallace	Keith Earls	Tommy O'Donnell	Mick English
2009–10	Mick O'Driscoll	Billy Holland	Scott Deasy	Jim McCarthy
2010–11	James Coughlan	Ian Nagle	Conor Murray	Tom Nesdale
2011–12	Donnacha Ryan	Peter O'Mahony	Dave O'Callaghan	Ray Hennessy
2012–13	Tommy O'Donnell	Simon Zebo	James Cronin	Liam Coughlan
2013–14	Conor Murray	JJ Hanrahan	Shane Buckley	Brian O'Brien
2014–15	CJ Stander	Duncan Casey	Jack O'Donoghue	Noel Murphy
2015–16	CJ Stander	Rory Scannell	Rory Scannell	Phil O'Callaghan
2016–17	Tyler Bleyendaal	Darren Sweetnam	Conor Oliver	Barry McGann
2017–18	Keith Earls	Sammy Arnold	Fineen Wycherley	Anthony Foley
2018–19	Peter O'Mahony	Dan Goggin	Craig Casey	Donal Lenihan
2019–20	CJ Stander	Shane Daly	Jack O'Sullivan	Garrett Fitzgerald
2020–21	Gavin Coombes	Craig Casey	Ben Healy	——
2021–22	Jack O'Donoghue	——	Alex Kendellen	——
2022-23	Jean Kleyn	——	Ruadhán Quinn	
2023-24	Calvin Nash	——	Brian Gleeson	

=== Overseas players ===
The following is a list of non-Irish qualified Munster players. Note: flags indicate national union as has been defined under World Rugby eligibility rules. Players may hold more than one non-WR nationality.

Union	Player	Season(s)
Argentina	Lucas González Amorosino	2015–2016
Argentina	Eusebio Guiñazú	2014–2015
Australia	Tim Bowman	2004–2005
Australia	Will Chambers	2011–2012
Australia	Mark Chisholm	2015–2017
Australia	Jed Holloway	2019
Australia	Simon Kerr	2002–2004
Australia	John Langford	1999–2001
Australia	David Pusey	2004–2005
Australia	Andrew Smith	2014–2015
Australia	Paul Warwick	2007–2011
Australia	Jim Williams	2001–2005
England	Gary Connolly	2005–2006
England	Andy Long	2003–2004
England	Dominic Malone	2002–2003
France	Julien Brugnaut	2009–2010
Germany	Justin Melck	2008
Italy	Federico Pucciariello	2005–2009
New Zealand	Te Aihe Toma	2016–2017
New Zealand	Peter Borlase	2010–2012
New Zealand	Christian Cullen	2003–2007
New Zealand	Rhys Ellison	1997–1999
New Zealand	Doug Howlett	2008–2013
New Zealand	Casey Laulala	2012–2014
New Zealand	Quentin MacDonald	2014
New Zealand	Lifeimi Mafi	2006–2012
New Zealand	Alby Mathewson	2018–2019
New Zealand	Toby Morland	2009
New Zealand	Alex Nankivell	2023–
New Zealand	Francis Saili	2015–2017
New Zealand	Rua Tipoki	2007–2009
New Zealand	Savenaca Tokula	2012
New Zealand	Sam Tuitupou	2010–2011
New Zealand	Nick Williams	2008–2010
Portugal	Diogo Mateus	2006–2007
Scotland	Gordon McIlwham	2003–2005
Scotland	Kiran McDonald	2022–2023
South Africa	Arno Botha	2018–2020
South Africa	BJ Botha	2011–2016
South Africa	Damian de Allende	2020–2022
South Africa	Jean de Villiers	2009–2010
South Africa	Wian du Preez	2009–2013
South Africa	Thomas du Toit	2016–2017
South Africa	Gerbrandt Grobler	2017–2018
South Africa	Trevor Halstead	2005–2007
South Africa	Pat Howard	2014–2015
South Africa	Jason Jenkins	2021–2022
South Africa	Jean Kleyn (Note: Kleyn joined Munster in 2016 and qualified for Ireland based on residency laws, going on to earn five international caps for Ireland in 2019, before reverting his international affiliation back to South Africa in June 2023 following changes to World Rugby's eligibility laws in 2021.)	2023–
South Africa	Shaun Payne	2003–2008
South Africa	Anton Pitout	2005–2006
South Africa	RG Snyman	2020–
South Africa	Jaco Taute	2016–2019
South Africa	Gerhard van den Heever	2013–2016
Tonga	Malakai Fekitoa	2022–2023
Uruguay	Mario Sagario	2015–2016
Wales	Jason Jones-Hughes	2003–2004
Wales	Chris Wyatt	2006–2007

== Individual records ==
(Correct as of 16 June 2025) Bold indicates highest overall record. All players are Irish unless otherwise indicated.

=== All-Time ===
(Correct as of 16 June 2025)

Category	Player	Totals	Years
Appearances	Stephen Archer	304	2009–2025
Points	Ronan O'Gara	2,625	1997–2013
Tries	Simon Zebo	73	2010–2018, 2021–2024

=== European Rugby Champions Cup ===
(Correct as of 1 June 2024)

Category	Player	Totals	Years
Appearances	Ronan O'Gara	110	1997–2013
Points	Ronan O'Gara	1,365	1997–2013
Tries	Simon Zebo	26	2011–2018, 2021–2024

=== United Rugby Championship ===
(Correct as of 14 June 2025)

Category	Player	Totals	Years
Appearances	Stephen Archer	237	2009–2025
Points	Ronan O'Gara	942	2001-2013
Tries	Simon Zebo	46	2010–2018, 2021–2024

== ERC Elite Team Awards ==
The ERC issued awards to teams that had played at least 50 matches in European competitions.
Correct as of 12 October 2025

Team	Matches played
Munster Rugby	206

== ERC Elite Player Awards ==
All players are Irish unless otherwise noted.

=== ERC 15 European Player Award ===
This award recognised the best European player in the Heineken Cup from 1995 to 2010.

Player	Position	Years
Ronan O'Gara	Fly-half	1997–2013

=== European Dream Team ===
In 2010, the following Munster players were selected in the ERC European Dream Team, an all–time dream team of Heineken Cup players.

Player	Position	Years
Anthony Foley	Number 8	1995–2008
Ronan O'Gara	Fly-half	1997–2013
David Wallace	Flanker	1997–2012

=== Scoring ===
The ERC issued awards to players who had scored at least 500 and 1,000 points in European competitions.

Players	Points
Ronan O'Gara	1,365

== United Rugby Championship Team of the Year ==
Competition	Irish players	Overseas players
2006–07	——	——
2007–08	——	(New Zealand) Lifeimi Mafi
2008–09	Ronan O'Gara, Jerry Flannery, Paul O'Connell	(New Zealand) Lifeimi Mafi (2)
2009–10	Tomás O'Leary	——
2010–11	Ronan O'Gara (2)	——
2011–12	——	(South Africa) BJ Botha
2012–13	——	——
2013–14	Dave Kilcoyne	(New Zealand) Casey Laulala
2014–15	Tommy O'Donnell	(South Africa) CJ Stander
2015–16	CJ Stander (2) (Note: CJ Stander became Irish-qualified on 1 November 2015 and represented the Irish national rugby union team.)	——
2016–17	Rory Scannell, Billy Holland, Dave Kilcoyne (2), John Ryan	(South Africa) Jaco Taute, (New Zealand) Tyler Bleyendaal
2017–18	——	——
2018–19	Tadhg Beirne (2), (Note: Tadhg Beirne was named in the 2017–18 dream team whilst a Scarlets player.); Peter O'Mahony	——
2019–20	——	——
2020–21	Billy Holland (2), Kevin O'Byrne	(South Africa) Damian de Allende
2021–22	Craig Casey; Jean Kleyn	——
2022–23	Gavin Coombes	——
2023–24	Tadhg Beirne (3), Jack Crowley	(New Zealand) Alex Nankivell
2024–25	Tadhg Beirne (4), Craig Casey (2), Tom Farrell	——

=== Golden Boot ===
The United Rugby Championship Golden Boot is awarded to the kicker who has successfully converted the highest percentage of place kicks during the 18-week regular URC season. The prize has been awarded annually since 2012.

Competition	Player	Success rate
2013–14	JJ Hanrahan	88.71%
2019–20	JJ Hanrahan	90.91%

=== Playmaker of the Year ===
The Playmaker award was first introduced in 2025 and is awarded to the player with the most points based upon their total number of try assists (3 points), offloads (2 points) and defenders beaten (1 point).

Competition	Player	Points
2024–25	Tom Farrell	158 points comes from five try assists (15 points), 41 offloads (82 points), and 61 defenders beaten (61 points)

== See also ==
- Category:Munster Rugby players
- History of rugby union matches between Leinster and Munster
- History of rugby union matches between Munster and Connacht
- History of rugby union matches between Munster and Ulster
