= History of rugby union matches between Munster and Ulster =

Munster versus Ulster is a rivalry that dates back to the foundation of the game in Ireland in 1879. Games between the two have occurred on an annual basis since the inception of the IRFU Interprovincial Championship in 1946. Since the beginning of the inter-provincials in 1946, Ulster hold a 56–43 advantage in overall wins, with ten draws. Additionally, since the inception of the Celtic League in 2001–02, Munster hold a slender 25–22 advantage in wins, with two draws in that time.

In addition to meeting each other regularly in domestic competition, they sometimes also face off in high-profile European competition. For example, in the 2012 Heineken Cup quarter-finals, Ulster beat Munster 22–16 to advance to the competition semi-finals.

== Summary of games since 1946 ==
Details	Played	Won by Munster	Won by Ulster	Drawn
Munster Home	51	27	18	6
Ulster Home	58	16	38	4
Overall	109	43	56	10

== Statistics ==
Record	Munster	Ulster
Longest winning streak	6 (1998/1999–2001/2002)	6 (1981–1982–1986/1987)
Largest points for
Home	64 (2018–2019)	38 (2020–2021)
Away	25 (1999–2000)	37 (1991–1992, 2008–2009)
Largest winning margin
Home	57 (64–7; 2018–2019)	25 (28–3; 2025–2026)
Away	21 (3–24; 2004–2005)	26 (11–37; 2008–2009)
Largest aggregate score
71 (Munster 64 Ulster 7; 2018–2019)
Lowest aggregate score
0 (Ulster 0 Munster 0; 1952–1953)
Highest attendance
26,500 (2011–12 Heineken Cup Quarter-finals, Thomond Park, 8 April 2012)

== Results ==
A history of Munster–Ulster results since the formation of the inter-provincial championship in 1946:

Season	Home	Away	Winner	Note(s)
1946–47	Ulster 6	Munster 3	Ulster (1)	
1947–48	Munster 6	Ulster 6	Draw (1)	
1948–49	Ulster 13	Munster 6	Ulster (2)	
1949–50	Munster 0	Ulster 11	Ulster (3)	
1950–51	Ulster 6	Munster 3	Ulster (4)	
1951–52	Munster 3	Ulster 16	Ulster (5)	
1952–53	Ulster 0	Munster 0	Draw (2)	
1953–54	Munster 11	Ulster 6	Munster (1)	
1954–55	Ulster 3	Munster 0	Ulster (6)	
1955–56	Munster 3	Ulster 6	Ulster (7)	
1956–57	Ulster 5	Munster 3	Ulster (8)	
1957–58	Munster 11	Ulster 6	Munster (2)	
1958–59	Ulster 8	Munster 6	Ulster (9)	
1959–60	Munster 18	Ulster 0	Munster (3)	
1960–61	Ulster 13	Munster 3	Ulster (10)	
1961–62	Munster 3	Ulster 26	Ulster (11)	
1962–63	Ulster 0	Munster 11	Munster (4)	
1963–64	Munster 0	Ulster 0	Draw (3)	
1964–65	Ulster 8	Munster 9	Munster (5)	
1965–66	Munster 13	Ulster 6	Munster (6)	
1966–67	Ulster 3	Munster 3	Draw (4)	
1967–68	Munster 6	Ulster 13	Ulster (12)	
1968–69	Ulster 9	Munster 17	Munster (7)	
1969–70	Munster 3	Ulster 3	Draw (5)	
1970–71	Ulster 8	Munster 3	Ulster (13)	
1971–72	Munster 6	Ulster 13	Ulster (14)	
1972–73	Ulster 4	Munster 3	Ulster (15)	
1973–74	Munster 6	Ulster 6	Draw (6)	
1974–75	Ulster 6	Munster 6	Draw (7)	
1975–76	Munster 7	Ulster 9	Ulster (16)	
1976–77	Ulster 27	Munster 24	Ulster (17)	
1977–78	Munster 6	Ulster 9	Ulster (18)	
1978–79	Ulster 6	Munster 11	Munster (8)	
1979–80	Munster 15	Ulster 11	Munster (9)	
1980–81	Ulster 10	Munster 21	Munster (10)	
1981–82	Munster 16	Ulster 18	Ulster (19)	
1982–83	Ulster 19	Munster 10	Ulster (20)	
1983–84	Munster 12	Ulster 13	Ulster (21)	
1984–85	Ulster 14	Munster 6	Ulster (22)	
1985–86	Munster 3	Ulster 23	Ulster (23)	
1986–87	Ulster 17	Munster 6	Ulster (24)	
1987–88	Munster 10	Ulster 10	Draw (8)	
1988–89	Ulster 12	Munster 9	Ulster (25)	
1989–90	Munster 10	Ulster 13	Ulster (26)	
1990–91	Ulster 19	Munster 15	Ulster (27)	
1991–92	Munster 22	Ulster 37	Ulster (28)	
1992–93	Ulster 12	Munster 11	Ulster (29)	
1993–94	Munster 21	Ulster 24	Ulster (30)	
1994–95	Ulster 16	Munster 17	Munster (11)	
1995–96	Ulster 14	Munster 10	Ulster (31)	
1996–97	Munster 27	Ulster 24	Munster (12)	
1997–98	Ulster 22	Munster 12	Ulster (32)	
1998–99	Ulster 29	Munster 12	Ulster (33)	
1998–99	Munster 31	Ulster 9	Munster (13)	
1999–2000	Ulster 24	Munster 25	Munster (14)	
1999–2000	Munster 36	Ulster 19	Munster (15)	
2000–01	Ulster 16	Munster 21	Munster (16)	
2000–01	Munster 29	Ulster 21	Munster (17)	
2001–02	Munster 15	Ulster 9	Munster (18)	2001–02 Celtic League semi-final
2001–02	Ulster 23	Munster 18	Ulster (34)	
2002–03	Ulster 26	Munster 17	Ulster (35)	
2002–03	Munster 42	Ulster 10	Munster (19)	2002–03 Celtic League semi-final
2003–04	Munster 15	Ulster 16	Ulster (36)	
2003–04	Ulster 36	Munster 13	Ulster (37)	
2004–05	Ulster 3	Munster 24	Munster (20)	
2004–05	Munster 21	Ulster 15	Munster (21)	
2005–06	Munster 17	Ulster 20	Ulster (38)	
2005–06	Ulster 27	Munster 3	Ulster (39)	
2006–07	Munster 21	Ulster 13	Munster (22)	
2006–07	Ulster 21	Munster 24	Munster (23)	
2007–08	Munster 42	Ulster 6	Munster (24)	
2007–08	Ulster 19	Munster 9	Ulster (40)	
2008–09	Ulster 22	Munster 6	Ulster (41)	
2008–09	Munster 11	Ulster 37	Ulster (42)	
2009–10	Munster 24	Ulster 10	Munster (25)	
2009–10	Ulster 15	Munster 10	Ulster (43)	
2010–11	Ulster 6	Munster 16	Munster (26)	
2010–11	Munster 35	Ulster 10	Munster (27)	
2011–12	Ulster 33	Munster 17	Ulster (44)	
2011–12	Munster 16	Ulster 22	Ulster (45)	2011–12 Heineken Cup quarter-final
2011–12	Munster 36	Ulster 8	Munster (28)	
2012–13	Ulster 20	Munster 19	Ulster (46)	
2012–13	Munster 24	Ulster 10	Munster (29)	
2013–14	Ulster 29	Munster 19	Ulster (47)	
2013–14	Munster 17	Ulster 19	Ulster (48)	
2014–15	Munster 21	Ulster 20	Munster (30)	
2014–15	Ulster 23	Munster 23	Draw (9)	
2015–16	Munster 32	Ulster 28	Munster (31)	
2015–16	Ulster 7	Munster 9	Munster (32)	
2016–17	Ulster 14	Munster 15	Munster (33)	
2016–17	Munster 22	Ulster 20	Munster (34)	
2017–18	Ulster 24	Munster 17	Ulster (49)	
2017–18	Munster 24	Ulster 24	Draw (10)	
2018–19	Munster 64	Ulster 7	Munster (35)	
2018–19	Ulster 19	Munster 12	Ulster (50)	
2019–20	Munster 22	Ulster 16	Munster (36)	
2019–20	Ulster 38	Munster 17	Ulster (51)	
2020–21	Ulster 15	Munster 10	Ulster (52)	
2020–21	Munster 38	Ulster 10	Munster (37)	
2021–22	Munster 18	Ulster 13	Munster (38)	
2021–22	Ulster 17	Munster 24	Munster (39)	
2021–22	Ulster 36	Munster 17	Ulster (53)	2021–22 URC quarter-final
2022–23	Munster 14	Ulster 15	Ulster (54)	
2022–23	Ulster 14	Munster 15	Munster (40)	
2023–24	Ulster 21	Munster 14	Ulster (55)	
2023–24	Munster 29	Ulster 24	Munster (41)	
2024–25	Ulster 19	Munster 22	Munster (42)	
2024–25	Munster 38	Ulster 20	Munster (43)	
2025–26	Ulster 28	Munster 3	Ulster (56)	

== See also ==
- IRFU Interprovincial Championship
- History of rugby union matches between Leinster and Munster
- History of rugby union matches between Leinster and Ulster
- History of rugby union matches between Munster and Connacht
