= 2021 Pro14 Grand Final =

Rugby union match

- Event: 2020–21 Pro14
Leinster	Munster
(Ireland)	(Ireland)
16	6
- Date: 27 March 2021
- Venue: RDS Arena, Dublin
- Man of the Match: Jack Conan
- Referee: Mike Adamson (SRU)
- Attendance: 0 (Note: This game was played behind closed doors due to COVID-19 restrictions.)

The 2021 Pro14 Grand Final was the final rugby match of the 2020–21 Pro14 season. The 2020–21 season was the seventh with Guinness as the title sponsor and the twelfth with a grand final. Leinster won the match 16–6 to win their fourth successive league title and their eighth overall.

== Route to the final ==
In a change from previous seasons, the 2020–21 Pro14 regular season was shortened to 16 rounds and, forgoing the usual play-offs, the teams finishing in the first place of each conference will advance straight to the final. These changes were made due to the creation of the Rainbow Cup, which will see four South African Super Rugby teams (the Bulls, Lions, Sharks and Stormers) join the twelve remaining Pro14 teams in a new tournament.

Irish province Munster became the first team to qualify for the final, after their 20–17 win against Connacht in round 14 gave them an unassailable 12 point lead at the top of conference B with two rounds remaining. Defending champions Leinster secured top spot in conference A with a 38–19 away win against Ulster, advancing to their fourth straight league final.

== Pre-match ==
The match was televised free-to-air by TG4 in the Republic of Ireland. It was also shown on Eir Sport and on Premier Sports in the UK. It was shown on ESPN+ in the United States.

== Final ==
=== Summary ===
In the first half, Ross Byrne kicked two penalties to put Leinster into a 6–0 lead after 11 minutes, before Joey Carbery then kicked two penalties for Munster to make the score 6–6 at half-time. The only try of the match came in the 46th minute from Leinster's Jack Conan when he charged for the line after a scrum and got over on the third attempt. Ross Byrne converted the try and added a third penalty in the 69th minute to make the final score 16–6, it was the sixth win in a row for Leinster against Munster.

=== Details ===
27 March 2021
17:00

Leinster (Ireland)	16–6	(Ireland) Munster
Try: Conan 46' c Con: R. Byrne (1/1) 47'; Pen: R. Byrne (3/4) 3', 11', 68'	Report	Pen: Carbery (2/3) 13', 40'+1

RDS
Attendance: 0
Referee: Mike Adamson (SRU)

FB	15	(Ireland) Hugo Keenan
RW	14	(Ireland) Jordan Larmour
OC	13	(Ireland) Rory O'Loughlin
IC	12	(Ireland) Robbie Henshaw
LW	11	(Ireland) Dave Kearney
FH	10	(Ireland) Ross Byrne	(substituted off) 59'	(substituted in) 64'
SH	9	(Ireland) Luke McGrath (c)	(substituted off) 75'
N8	8	(Ireland) Jack Conan
OF	7	(Ireland) Josh van der Flier
BF	6	(Ireland) Rhys Ruddock	(substituted off) 73'
RL	5	(Australia) Scott Fardy	(substituted off) 59'
LL	4	(Ireland) Devin Toner
TP	3	(Ireland) Andrew Porter	(substituted off) 52'
HK	2	(Ireland) Rónan Kelleher	(substituted off) 69'
LP	1	(Ireland) Cian Healy	(substituted in) 52'
Substitutions:
HK	16	(Ireland) James Tracy	(substituted in) 69'
PR	17	(Ireland) Ed Byrne	(substituted in) 52'
PR	18	(Ireland) Tadhg Furlong	(substituted in) 52'
LK	19	(Ireland) Ross Molony	(substituted in) 73'
LK	20	(Ireland) Ryan Baird	(substituted in) 59'
SH	21	(Ireland) Jamison Gibson-Park	(substituted in) 75'
FH	22	(Ireland) Johnny Sexton	(substituted in) 59'	(substituted off) 64'
WG	23	(Ireland) James Lowe
Coach:
(Ireland) Leo Cullen

FB	15	(Ireland) Mike Haley
RW	14	(Ireland) Andrew Conway
OC	13	(Ireland) Chris Farrell
IC	12	(South Africa) Damian de Allende	(substituted off) 73'
LW	11	(Ireland) Keith Earls
FH	10	(Ireland) Joey Carbery	(substituted off) 69'
SH	9	(Ireland) Conor Murray	(substituted off) 69'
N8	8	(Ireland) CJ Stander
OF	7	(Ireland) Peter O'Mahony (c)	(substituted off) 48'
BF	6	(Ireland) Gavin Coombes
RL	5	(Ireland) Tadhg Beirne
LL	4	(Ireland) Jean Kleyn	(substituted off) 69'
TP	3	(Ireland) John Ryan	(substituted off) 51'
HK	2	(Ireland) Niall Scannell	(substituted off) 52'
LP	1	(Ireland) James Cronin	(substituted off) 51'
Substitutions:
HK	16	(Ireland) Kevin O'Byrne	(substituted in) 52'
PR	17	(Ireland) Dave Kilcoyne	(substituted in) 51'
PR	18	(Ireland) Stephen Archer	(substituted in) 51'
LK	19	(Ireland) Billy Holland	(substituted in) 69'
BR	20	(Ireland) Jack O'Donoghue	(substituted in) 48'
SH	21	(Ireland) Craig Casey	(substituted in) 69'
FH	22	(Ireland) JJ Hanrahan	(substituted in) 69'
CE	23	(Ireland) Rory Scannell	(substituted in) 73'
Coach:
(South Africa) Johann van Graan

Man of the Match:
(Ireland) Jack Conan

Assistant referees:
Chris Busby (IRFU)
Seán Gallagher (IRFU)
Television match official:
Joy Neville (IRFU)
