= Tom Nesdale =

Irish rugby union player

- Full name: Thomas Jude Nesdale
- Born: 18 August 1933 Cork, Ireland
- Died: 14 November 2019 (aged 86) Sandycove, Ireland
- School: Presentation Brothers College

Rugby union career
- Position: Lock
International career
Years	Team	Apps	(Points)
1961	Ireland	1	(0)

Thomas Jude Nesdale (18 August 1933 — 14 November 2019) was an Irish international rugby union player.

Nesdale was born in Cork and educated at Presentation Brothers College.

A second-rower, Nesdale captained Presentation Brothers College to the 1952 Munster Schools Senior Cup title. He played his senior rugby at Garryowen and won a Munster Senior Cup with the club in 1954. A regular Munster representative, Nesdale was in the side that secured a draw with the touring 1957–58 Wallabies. He was capped by Ireland in a match against France at Lansdowne Road in the 1961 Five Nations.

Nesdale's first cousin Gerald is the father of former Ireland hooker Ross Nesdale.

In 2011, Nesdale was inducted into the Munster Rugby Hall of Fame.

== See also ==
- List of Ireland national rugby union players
