= John O'Sullivan (rugby union) =

Irish rugby union player

- Born: 12 August 1980 (age 46) Tralee
- School: Newbridge College

Rugby union career
- Position: number eight
Senior career
Years	Team	Apps	(Points)
2003-05	Connacht		
2005-09	Munster	36	(5)
2009-	Agen		
International career
Years	Team	Apps	(Points)
2007	Ireland A	2	(0)

John O'Sullivan (born 12 July 1980) is a rugby union player who currently plays for Agen in the French Top 14. He plays as a back row forward, preferably at number eight. He is a native of Tralee and attended Newbridge College in County Kildare.

He formerly played for Munster in the Celtic League. Before being recruited by his native province, O'Sullivan played for two seasons with Connacht. In the 2003–04 season he was voted Connacht's senior player of the year. He left Munster at the end of the 2008–09 season to join Agen.
