= 2020–21 Munster Rugby season =

- Ground(s): Thomond Park (Capacity: 25,600); Musgrave Park (Capacity: 8,008)
- Chairman: Gerry O'Shea
- CEO: Ian Flanagan
- President: Seán McCullough
- Coach: Johann van Graan
- Captain: Peter O'Mahony
- Most appearances: Two players: Gavin Coombes (22); Jack O'Donoghue (22)
- Top scorer: JJ Hanrahan (131)
- Most tries: Gavin Coombes (15)
- League: Pro14
- 2020–21: 1st (Conf. B), Runners up

The 2020–21 Munster Rugby season was Munster's twentieth season competing in the Pro14, alongside which they also competed in the European Rugby Champions Cup. It was Johann van Graan's fourth season as head coach.

== Events ==
As in the 2019–20 Pro14 season, Munster spent the 2020–21 Pro14 season in Conference B, alongside Benetton, Cardiff Blues, Connacht, Edinburgh and Scarlets South African side the Southern Kings were scheduled to participate in the conference, but they declared their withdrawal from rugby for the remainder of 2020 due to financial difficulties and travel restrictions enforced by the South African government in response to the COVID-19 pandemic, before the South African Rugby Union board placed the club into voluntary liquidation in September 2020.

Due to the mid-season break during the 2019–20 season caused by the COVID-19 pandemic, the 2020–21 season started later than usual. The EPCR agreed a new format for the 2020–21 European Rugby Champions Cup in response to COVID-19: the top eight eligible teams from the Pro14, the Gallagher Premiership and Top 14 competed in a 24-team tournament divided into two pools of twelve teams, with each team playing four games in the pool stage - two at home and two away.

Ahead of the season, there were no changes to Munster's coaching stuff, though CEO Ian Flanagan told journalists that, while it isn't a priority, the search for a fifth coach to join the team remained active. Head of athletic performance Denis Logan returned home to the United States with his family at the end of October 2020, with Ged McNamara, previously the lead athletic development coach for Munster's academy, promoted to replace Logan. Elite player development manager Peter Malone left his academy role with the province in early 2021, and former Munster player Andi Kyriacou returned to the province as an elite player development officer in April 2021.

The big news in terms of player movements was the arrival of two of South Africa's 2019 Rugby World Cup-winning squad - centre Damian de Allende and lock RG Snyman. Irish-qualified fullback Matt Gallagher arrived from English club Saracens, while Hawaii-born prop Roman Salanoa made the move south from Leinster. Five academy players also graduated to the senior squad: prop Keynan Knox, hooker Diarmuid Barron, back-rower Jack O'Sullivan, centre Alex McHenry and winger Liam Coombes.

Two players - fly-half Tyler Bleyendaal and prop Brian Scott - were forced to retire from rugby due to injury during the 2019–20 mid-season break, whilst prop Ciaran Parker, locks Darren O'Shea and Seán O'Connor, back-rowers Arno Botha and Conor Oliver and centre Sammy Arnold departed the province for new clubs. Winger Alex Wootton also left the province on loan to Connacht for the 2020–21 season.

On the academy front, three players joined year one of the programme: hooker Scott Buckley, back-rower Alex Kendellen and fly-half Jack Crowley. Jack Stafford and Alan Tynan completed their three years in the academy and were released by the province. Lock Cian Hurley and winger Conor Phillips joined the academy in April 2021, whilst hooker Eoghan Clarke left to join English club Jersey Reds.

Munster opened their 2020–21 Pro14 season with a 30–27 away win against Scarlets on 3 October 2020. Despite nine penalties from Scarlets fullback Leigh Halfpenny and a red card for captain Peter O'Mahony, tries from Jack O'Donoghue and Chris Farrell kept Munster within touching distance of the hosts, and a try from replacement hooker Kevin O'Byrne, converted by Ben Healy, levelled the score going into the final minutes of the game, before academy fly-half Healy scored a 50-metre penalty in the 81st minute to earn what had previously looked like an unlikely win for the province.

The draw for the 2020–21 European Rugby Champions Cup was made on 28 October 2020, with Munster being drawn in pool B. The province faced English side Harlequins, where former Munster player and coach Jerry Flannery was a coach, and French side Clermont, who were, at the time, the only French side to have ever won a Champions Cup game in Thomond Park.

Munster's Champions Cup campaign commenced with a 21–7 home win against Harlequins on 13 December 2020, in which Gavin Coombes, Damian de Allende and Josh Wycherley made their tournament debuts. Coombes scored one try, with the other being a penalty try, with JJ Hanrahan and Ben Healy adding nine points of the kicking tee between them. Munster travelled away to Clermont for round two on 19 December 2020 and, despite trailing 28–9 to the home side at one point, fought back to earn a stunning 39–31 win at the Stade Marcel-Michelin. The tries for Munster came from Mike Haley, star-of-the-match CJ Stander and Kevin O'Byrne, with JJ Hanrahan scoring a perfect nine from nine off the kicking tee for the other 24 points.

It was announced in December 2020 that the 2020–21 Pro14 season would conclude after 16 rounds, with the winners of each conference advancing straight to the final on 27 March 2021. Four South African Super Rugby teams - the Bulls, Lions, Sharks and Stormers - were then be introduced in the Rainbow Cup.

In early January 2021, the EPCR took the decision to temporarily suspend rounds 3 and 4 of the 2020–21 Champions Cup, following a directive from authorities in France that French clubs should not participate in the scheduled matches in response to health risks posed by the COVID-19 pandemic.

Munster's 20–17 win against Connacht in round 14 of the 2020–21 Pro14 on 5 March 2021 saw them become the first team to qualify for 2021 Pro14 Grand Final, as the victory gave them an unassailable 12 point lead at the top of conference B with two rounds remaining. Munster were beaten 16–6 by arch-rivals Leinster in the 2021 Pro14 Grand Final on 27 March 2021.

The Champions Cup resumed on the weekend of 2/3/4 April 2021 with the top eight teams from each pool at the time of suspension progressing to the round of 16, where Munster had home advantage thanks to their wins in the opening games against Harlequins and Clermont. Munster were drawn against Toulouse.

In an enthralling encounter at Thomond Park, Munster led 16–9 at half-time thanks to two tries from Keith Earls and two penalties from Joey Carbery, but Toulouse pulled level thanks to a converted try from Matthis Lebel. Gavin Coombes scored from close-range to give Munster the lead again, before Toulouse captain Julien Marchand responded with a try to level the scores again at 23–23. Substitute fly-half JJ Hanrahan scored a penalty to give Munster a 26–23 lead heading into the final 15 minutes of the match, but Toulouse's talismanic scrum-half Antoine Dupont scored two tries in 9 minutes to help the French club pull away on the scoreboard. A late consolation try from Gavin Coombes, his second of the match, in overtime meant the final score was 40–33 to Toulouse, who became just the second French club to win a European match at Thomond Park and advanced to an away quarter-final against Munster's pool opponents Clermont.

Munster's Pro14 Rainbow Cup commenced with a 27–3 away win against Leinster on 24 April 2021, which was followed by a 38–10 home win against Ulster on 7 May 2021, before Munster's perfect start to the tournament was brought to a halt by a 24–20 home defeat against Connacht on 14 May 2021. The province returned to winning ways with a hard-fought 31–27 win against Cardiff Blues on 28 May 2021, however, Munster's hopes of reaching the final of the tournament were ended when northern pool leaders Benetton were awarded four match points after COVID-19 cases amongst their Welsh opponents Ospreys forced the cancellation of their scheduled fixture, giving the Italian team an unassailable lead at the top of the pool. Munster's final game of the tournament, and the season, was a 54–11 away win against Zebre on 11 June 2021.

== Coaching and management staff ==
Position	Name	Nationality
Head coach	Johann van Graan	South Africa
Senior coach	Stephen Larkham	Australia
Defence coach	JP Ferreira	South Africa
Forwards coach	Graham Rowntree	England
Team manager	Niall O'Donovan	Ireland
Head of athletic performance	Denis Logan (Until October 2020)	United States
Head of athletic performance	Ged McNamara (Since November 2020)	Ireland
Strength and conditioning coach	Damien O'Donoghue	Ireland
Strength and conditioning coach	Adam Sheehan	Ireland
Performance analyst	George Murray	Ireland

== Players ==
=== Senior squad ===
Munster Rugby senior squad (Note: Alex Wootton is contracted to Munster for the 2020–21 season, but is on a season-long loan at Connacht. Ulster academy prop Callum Reid joined Munster on a six-week loan as injury cover ahead of round 4 of the 2020–21 Pro14. Leinster sub-academy scrum-half Ben Murphy joined on a seven-week deal as cover ahead of round 5. Leinster academy scrum-half Paddy Patterson joined on a short-term contract at the end of January 2021. Darren Sweetnam joined La Rochelle as injury cover for three months in late March 2021.)
**Props**: (Ireland) **Stephen Archer**; (Ireland) **James Cronin**; (Ireland) **Dave Kilcoyne**; (South Africa) Keynan Knox*; (Ireland) Jeremy Loughman; (Ireland) Liam O'Connor; (Ireland) Callum Reid ^{L}; (Ireland) **John Ryan**; (United States) Roman Salanoa*; **Hookers**: (Ireland) Diarmuid Barron; (New Zealand) Rhys Marshall*; (Ireland) Kevin O'Byrne; (Ireland) **Niall Scannell**; **Locks**: (Ireland) **Tadhg Beirne**; (Ireland) **Billy Holland**; (Ireland) **Jean Kleyn**; (South Africa) **RG Snyman**; (Ireland) Fineen Wycherley	**Back row**: (South Africa) Chris Cloete*; (Ireland) Gavin Coombes; (Ireland) **Tommy O'Donnell**; (Ireland) **Jack O'Donoghue**; (Ireland) **Peter O'Mahony** (c); (Ireland) Jack O'Sullivan; (Ireland) **CJ Stander**; **Scrum-halves**: (Ireland) **Craig Casey**; (Ireland) Neil Cronin; (Ireland) Nick McCarthy; (Ireland) Ben Murphy ^{L}; (Ireland) **Conor Murray**; (Ireland) Paddy Patterson ^{ST}; **Fly-halves**: (Ireland) **Joey Carbery**; (Ireland) JJ Hanrahan	**Centres**: (South Africa) **Damian de Allende**; (Ireland) **Chris Farrell**; (Ireland) Dan Goggin; (Ireland) Alex McHenry; (Ireland) **Rory Scannell**; **Back three**: (Ireland) **Andrew Conway**; (Ireland) Liam Coombes; (Ireland) **Shane Daly**; (Ireland) **Keith Earls**; (England) Matt Gallagher*; (Ireland) **Mike Haley**; (Ireland) Calvin Nash; (Ireland) **Darren Sweetnam**; (Ireland) Alex Wootton
(c) denotes the team captain, **Bold** denotes internationally capped players.^{*} denotes players qualified to play for Ireland on residency or dual nationality.^{ST} denotes a short-term signing.^{L} denotes a player on loan at the club. Players and their allocated positions from the Munster Rugby website.

=== Academy squad ===
Munster Rugby academy squad
**Props**: (Ireland) James French **(3)**; (Ireland) Josh Wycherley **(3)**; **Hookers**: (Ireland) Scott Buckley **(1)**; (Ireland) Eoghan Clarke **(3)**; **Locks**: (Ireland) Thomas Ahern **(3)**; (Ireland) Cian Hurley **(1)**; (Ireland) Paddy Kelly **(2)**; (Ireland) Eoin O'Connor **(2)**	**Back row**: (Ireland) Jack Daly **(3)**; (Ireland) John Hodnett **(2)**; (Ireland) Alex Kendellen **(1)**; **Scrum-halves**: None; **Fly-halves**: (Ireland) Jack Crowley **(1)**; (Ireland) Jake Flannery **(2)**; (Ireland) Ben Healy **(3)**	**Centres**: None; **Back three**: (Ireland) Seán French **(3)**; (Ireland) Conor Phillips **(1)**; (Ireland) Jonathan Wren **(3)**
(c) denotes the team captain, **Bold** denotes internationally capped players, number in brackets indicates players stage in the three-year academy cycle.^{*} denotes players qualified to play for Ireland on residency or dual nationality. Players and their allocated positions from the Munster Rugby website.

== Player movements ==
The 2020–21 season was unusual in that many of the players scheduled to join their new clubs during the summer pre-season ahead of the commencement of the new season were instead able to join during the mid-season break in the 2019–20 season caused by the COVID-19 pandemic. Below are the player movements originally scheduled for the 2020–21 season that instead took place in that mid-season break. Italics indicates players that transferred during the 2020–21 season.

=== Senior squad ===
Players in

- (South Africa) Keynan Knox promoted from Academy
- (Ireland) Liam Coombes promoted from Academy
- (Ireland) Alex McHenry promoted from Academy
- (Ireland) Jack O'Sullivan promoted from Academy
- (South Africa) Damian de Allende from (Japan) Panasonic Wild Knights
- (England) Matt Gallagher from (England) Saracens
- (South Africa) RG Snyman from (Japan) Honda Heat
- (United States) Roman Salanoa from (Ireland) Leinster
- (Ireland) Diarmuid Barron promoted from Academy
- (Ireland) Callum Reid from (Ireland) Ulster (6-week loan)
- (Ireland) Ben Murphy from (Ireland) Leinster sub-academy (7-week deal)
- (Ireland) Paddy Patterson from (Ireland) Leinster academy (short-term deal)

Players out

- (South Africa) Arno Botha to (South Africa) Bulls
- (Ireland) Sammy Arnold to (Ireland) Connacht
- (Ireland) Conor Oliver to (Ireland) Connacht
- (Ireland) Seán O'Connor to Jersey Reds
- (England) Ciaran Parker to Jersey Reds
- (Ireland) Alex Wootton to (Ireland) Connacht (season-long loan)
- (Ireland) Darren O'Shea to (France) Vannes
- (Ireland) Darren Sweetnam to (France) La Rochelle (three-month deal)

=== Academy squad ===
Players in

- (Ireland) Scott Buckley
- (Ireland) Jack Crowley
- (Ireland) Alex Kendellen
- (Ireland) Cian Hurley
- (Ireland) Conor Phillips

Players out

- (Ireland) Alan Tynan
- (Ireland) Jack Stafford to (England) Harlequins
- (Ireland) Eoghan Clarke to (England) Jersey Reds

== 2020–21 Pro14 ==
2020–21 Pro14 table
Conference A
	Team	P	W	D	L	PF	PA	PD	TF	TA	TBP	LBP	PTS
1	(Ireland) Leinster (CH)	16	14	0	2	576	285	+291	82	33	14	1	71
2	(Ireland) Ulster	16	14	0	2	469	263	+206	65	34	8	0	64
3	(Wales) Ospreys	16	8	0	8	301	318	-17	34	39	1	3	36
4	(Scotland) Glasgow Warriors	16	6	0	10	335	377	-42	40	47	2	4	30
5	(Wales) Dragons	16	6	0	10	215	394	-79	36	50	2	3	29
6	(Italy) Zebre	16	4	0	12	237	508	-271	22	69	0	1	17
Conference B
	Team	P	W	D	L	PF	PA	PD	TF	TA	TBP	LBP	PTS
1	(Ireland) Munster (RU)	16	14	0	2	413	250	+163	49	26	7	2	64
2	(Ireland) Connacht	16	8	0	8	396	353	+43	53	36	7	6	45
3	(Wales) Scarlets	16	8	0	8	319	333	-14	36	38	3	4	39
4	(Wales) Cardiff Blues	16	8	0	8	265	284	-19	30	32	3	1	36
5	(Scotland) Edinburgh	16	5	1	10	247	344	-97	29	43	1	4	29*
6	(Italy) Benetton	16	0	1	15	252	415	-164	34	53	1	6	7*
* Cancelled fixture: Edinburgh awarded four match points.
If teams are level at any stage, tiebreakers are applied in the following order: 1. number of matches won 2. the difference between points for and points against 3. the number of tries scored 4. the most points scored 5. the difference between tries for and tries against 6. the fewest red cards received 7. the fewest yellow cards received
Green background indicates teams that will compete in the Pro14 Final, and also earn a place in the 2021–22 European Champions Cup Blue background indicates teams outside the play-off places that earn a place in the 2021–22 European Champions Cup; Plain background indicates teams that earn a place in the 2021–22 European Rugby Challenge Cup. (CH) Champions. (RU) Runners-up. (PO) Champions Cup play-off winners.

=== Round 1 ===
3 October 2020
15:00

(1 BP) Scarlets (Wales)	27–30	(Ireland) Munster
Pen: Halfpenny (9/9) 16', 20', 25', 35', 45', 51', 55', 65', 70'	Report; Report	Try: O'Donoghue 28' c Farrell 67' c O'Byrne 77' c Con: Hanrahan (1/1) 28'; Healy (2/2) 69', 78'; Pen: Hanrahan (1/2) 48'; Healy (2/2) 72', 80+1'

Parc y Scarlets
Attendance: 0
Referee: Sam Grove-White (SRU)

=== Round 2 ===
10 October 2020
19:35

Munster (Ireland)	25–23	(Scotland) Edinburgh (1 BP)
Try: Stander 76' c Con: Healy (1/1) 77'; Pen: Healy (6/7) 3', 6', 19', 40', 53', 57'	Report; Report	Try: Bennett 12' c Nel 29' c Con: Van der Walt (2/2) 13', 30'; Pen: Van der Walt (2/2) 49', 73'; Bennett (1/1) 66'

Thomond Park
Attendance: 0
Referee: Nigel Owens (WRU)

=== Round 3 ===
26 October 2020
20:15

(1 BP) Munster (Ireland)	38–27	(Wales) Cardiff Blues
Try: G. Coombes (2) 6' c, 26' c O'Byrne 51' c O'Donoghue 58' c Hanrahan 67' c Con: Healy (4/4) 7', 27', 52', 59'; Hanrahan (1/1) 68'; Pen: Healy (1/2) 40'	Report; Report	Try: Lee-Lo 1' c Summerhill 54' c Halaholo 62' c Con: J. Evans (3/3) 2', 55', 63'; Pen: J. Evans (2/2) 16', 29'

Thomond Park
Attendance: 0
Referee: Andrea Piardi (FIR)

=== Round 4 ===
1 November 2020
14:00

Dragons (Wales)	16–28	(Ireland) Munster
Try: S. Davies 31' m Screech 79' m Pen: S. Davies (2/3) 2', 46'	Report; Report	Try: Gallagher (2) 13' m, 71' c Nash 24' c Con: Hanrahan (2/3) 25', 72'; Pen: Hanrahan (3/3) 7', 22', 51'

Rodney Parade
Attendance: 0
Referee: Ben Blain (SRU)

=== Round 5 ===
7 November 2020
14:00

Benetton (Italy)	P–P	(Ireland) Munster

Stadio Monigo

- Fixture postponed due to COVID-19 cases amongst the Benetton squad.

=== Round 6 ===
15 November 2020
14:45

(1 BP) Munster (Ireland)	38–22	(Wales) Ospreys
Try: G. Coombes (3) 13' c, 43' c, 53' c Haley 18' c O'Byrne 37'; Con: Hanrahan (1/1) 14'; R. Scannell (1/1) 19'; Healy (3/3) 38', 44', 54'; Pen: Healy (1/1) 23'	Report; Report	Try: L. Morgan 5' c Lake 64' m Penalty try 76'; Con: Myler (1/2) 7'; Pen: Myler (1/1) 33'

Thomond Park
Attendance: 0
Referee: Gianluca Gnecchi (FIR)

=== Round 7 ===
23 November 2020
20:15

Glasgow Warriors (Scotland)	13–27	(Ireland) Munster (1 BP)
Try: Bryce 13' m Stewart 63' m Pen: Thomson (1/1) 18'	Report; Report	Try: Holland 10' c F. Wycherley 31' m G. Coombes 68' c Kleyn 77' m Con: Healy (2/3) 12', 70'; Pen: Healy (1/3) 46'

Scotstoun Stadium
Attendance: 0
Referee: Adam Jones (WRU)

=== Round 8 ===
30 November 2020
20:15

(1 BP) Munster (Ireland)	52–3	(Italy) Zebre
Try: Goggin 7' c De Allende 26' c Penalty try 36'; Sweetnam 40' c Hanrahan 43' c S. French 56' c Casey 78' m Ahern 80+2' m Con: Hanrahan (5/7) 8', 27', 40+1', 44', 58'	Report; Report	Pen: Pescetto (1/1) 13'

Thomond Park
Attendance: 0
Referee: Ben Whitehouse (WRU)

=== Round 9 ===
26 December 2020
19:35

Munster (Ireland)	P–P	(Ireland) Leinster

Thomond Park

- Fixture postponed due to delayed COVID-19 test results from Leinster.

=== Round 10 ===
2 January 2021
17:15

Ulster (Ireland)	15–10	(Ireland) Munster (1 BP)
Try: Faddes 6' m McIlroy 16' c Con: Cooney (1/2) 17'; Pen: Cooney (1/1) 28'	Report; Report	Try: Sweetnam 80+2' c Con: Crowley (1/1) 80+4'; Pen: Healy (1/2) 12'

Kingspan Stadium
Attendance: 0
Referee: Mike Adamson (SRU)

=== Round 11 ===
9 January 2021
19:35

(1 BP) Connacht (Ireland)	10–16	(Ireland) Munster
Try: Sullivan 78' c Con: Carty (1/1) 78'; Pen: Carty (1/2) 40+1'	Report; Report	Try: Farrell 18' c Con: Hanrahan (1/1) 10'; Pen: Hanrahan (3/3) 19', 42', 61'

The Sportsground
Attendance: 0
Referee: Frank Murphy (IRFU)

=== Rescheduled round 9 ===
23 January 2021
19:35

(1 BP) Munster (Ireland)	10–13	(Ireland) Leinster
Try: Beirne 11' c Con: Hanrahan (1/1) 11'; Pen: Hanrahan (1/3) 5'	Report; Report	Try: Larmour 69' c Con: R. Byrne (1/1) 70'; Pen: Sexton (2/2) 25', 40+4'

Thomond Park
Attendance: 0
Referee: Andrew Brace (IRFU)

=== Rescheduled round 5 ===
30 January 2021
17:00

(1 BP) Benetton (Italy)	16–18	(Ireland) Munster
Try: Esposito 25' m Sarto 71' m Pen: Allan (2/2) 33', 40'	Report; Report	Try: Sweetnam 2' m N. Scannell 9' c Con: Healy (1/2) 10'; Pen: Healy (1/1) 54'; Drop: Hanrahan (1/1) 80+1'

Stadio Monigo
Attendance: 0
Referee: Andrea Piardi (FIR)

=== Round 12 ===
20 February 2021
19:35

Edinburgh (Scotland)	10–22	(Ireland) Munster
Try: Mata 45' c Con: Van der Walt (1/1) 46'; Pen: Van der Walt (1/1) 8'	Report; Report	Try: O'Donoghue 29' c Casey 36' c G. Coombes 55' m Con: Hanrahan (2/3) 30', 36'; Pen: Hanrahan (1/1) 15'

Murrayfield
Attendance: 0
Referee: Mike Adamson (SRU)

=== Round 13 ===
26 February 2021
20:00

Cardiff Blues (Wales)	11–20	(Ireland) Munster
Try: S. Davies 11' m Pen: B. Thomas (2/4) 36', 52'	Report; Report	Try: Kleyn 54' c N. Scannell 77' c Con: Hanrahan (1/1) 55'; Carbery (1/1) 78'; Pen: Hanrahan (2/3) 27', 38'

Cardiff Arms Park
Attendance: 0
Referee: Adam Jones (WRU)

=== Round 14 ===
5 March 2021
19:35

Munster (Ireland)	20–17	(Ireland) Connacht (1 BP)
Try: J. Cronin 22' c Haley 57' c Con: Healy (1/1) 23'; Carbery (1/1) 58'; Pen: Healy (1/3) 43'; Carbery (1/1) 68'	Report; Report	Try: Healy 4' c Boyle 62' c Con: Carty (2/2) 5', 64'; Pen: Carty (1/1) 26'

Thomond Park
Attendance: 0
Referee: Chris Busby (IRFU)

=== Round 15 ===
12 March 2021
20:00

(1 BP) Munster (Ireland)	28–10	(Wales) Scarlets
Try: G. Coombes 19' c S. Daly 25' c N. Scannell 40' c O'Byrne 58' c Con: Carbery (4/4) 20', 25', 40+1', 59'	Report; Report	Try: S. Evans 80+2'; Con: O'Brien (1/1) 80+2'; Pen: O'Brien (1/1) 24'

Thomond Park
Attendance: 0
Referee: Seán Gallagher (IRFU)

=== Round 16 ===
19 March 2021
18:00

(1 BP) Munster (Ireland)	31–17	(Italy) Benetton
Try: McHenry 39' c Knox 46' c Salanoa 58' c Healy 73' c Con: Hanrahan (3/3) 40', 47', 58'; Healy (1/1) 74'; Pen: Hanrahan (1/1) 26'	Report; Report	Try: Duvenage 22' c Els 70' m Pettinelli 78' m Con: Allan (1/3) 23'

Thomond Park
Attendance: 0
Referee: Hollie Davidson (SRU)

=== Final ===
27 March 2021
17:00

Leinster (Ireland)	16–6	(Ireland) Munster
Try: Conan 46' c Con: R. Byrne (1/1) 47'; Pen: R. Byrne (3/4) 3', 11', 68'	Report; Report	Pen: Carbery (2/3) 13', 40+1'

RDS
Attendance: 0
Referee: Mike Adamson (SRU)

== Rainbow Cup ==
Pro14 Rainbow Cup
	Team	P	W	D	L	PF	PA	PD	TF	TA	Try bonus	Losing bonus	Pts
1	(Italy) Benetton	5	4	1	0	125	78	+47	14	10	2	0	22**
2	(Ireland) Munster	5	4	0	1	170	75	+95	23	8	3	1	20
3	(Scotland) Glasgow Warriors	5	4	0	1	121	117	+4	17	15	3	0	19
4	(Ireland) Leinster	5	3	0	2	124	87	+37	19	10	2	1	15
5	(Wales) Cardiff Blues	5	3	0	2	124	123	+1	16	16	2	1	15
6	(Ireland) Connacht	5	3	0	2	109	133	–24	15	18	2	0	14
7	(Wales) Scarlets	5	1	2	2	110	115	–5	13	15	2	1	13*
8	(Wales) Ospreys	5	2	1	2	103	88	+15	14	11	2	1	11**
9	(Scotland) Edinburgh	5	1	1	3	126	140	–14	18	19	2	2	10
10	(Ireland) Ulster	5	1	1	3	85	116	–31	12	18	2	2	8*
11	(Wales) Dragons	5	1	0	4	117	156	–39	14	22	2	1	7
12	(Italy) Zebre	5	0	0	5	88	174	-86	10	23	0	3	3
* Cancelled fixture: Scarlets awarded four match points. ** Cancelled fixture: Benetton awarded four match points.
If teams are level at any stage, tiebreakers are applied in the following order: 1. number of matches won; 2. the difference between points for and points against; 3. the number of tries scored; 4. the most points scored; 5. the difference between tries for and tries against; 6. the fewest red cards received; 7. the fewest yellow cards received.
Green background (row 1) is the play-off places and earn a place in the final against the 1st placed Rainbow Cup SA team.

=== Round 1 ===
24 April 2021
19:35

Leinster (Ireland)	3–27	(Ireland) Munster
Pen: Hawkshaw (1/2) 8'	Report; Report	Try: Murray (2) 4' c, 61' c Penalty try 71'; Con: Carbery (2/2) 5', 62'; Pen: Carbery (2/2) 36', 52'

RDS
Attendance: 0
Referee: Chris Busby (IRFU)

=== Round 2 ===
7 May 2021
20:15

(1 BP) Munster (Ireland)	38–10	(Ireland) Ulster
Try: R. Scannell (2) 10' c, 54' c Murray 26' m Haley 40' c Hanrahan 58' c Conway 78' m Con: Hanrahan (4/5) 11', 40+1', 55', 59'	Report; Report	Try: Henderson 43' c Con: Lowry (1/1) 45'; Pen: Lowry (1/1) 2'

Thomond Park
Attendance: 0
Referee: Craig Evans (WRU)

=== Round 3 ===
14 May 2021
18:00

(1 BP) Munster (Ireland)	20–24	(Ireland) Connacht
Try: J.Cronin 6' c Marshall 34' c Con: Healy (2/2) 7', 35'; Pen: Healy (1/1) 51'; Carbery (1/1) 64'	Report; Report	Try: Arnold 8' c C. Fitzgerald 26' c Marmion 40' c Con: C. Fitzgerald (3/3) 9', 27', 41'; Pen: C. Fitzgerald (1/1) 4'

Thomond Park
Attendance: 0
Referee: Dan Jones (WRU)

=== Round 4 ===
28 May 2021
19:35

(1 BP) Munster (Ireland)	31–27	(Wales) Cardiff Blues (1 BP)
Try: N. Scannell (2) 29' c, 37' c F. Wycherley 33' c Knox 74' c Con: Carbery (4/4) 30', 34', 38', 75'; Pen: Carbery (1/1) 50'	Report; Report	Try: To. Williams (2) 2' c, 45' c L. Williams 55' c Con: J. Evans (3/3) 3', 46', 56'; Pen: J. Evans (2/2) 18', 69'

Thomond Park
Attendance: 0
Referee: Andrew Brace (IRFU)

=== Round 5 ===
- Round 5 was a bye-week for Munster.

=== Round 6 ===
11 June 2021
18:00

Zebre (Italy)	11–54	(Ireland) Munster (1 BP)
Try: Mori 57' m Pen: Canna (2/2) 21', 24'	Report; Report	Try: G. Coombes (4) 9' c, 35' c, 68' c, 80+5' m Casey (2) 27' c, 40+1' c N. Scannell 46' c L. Coombes 60' c Con: Carbery (6/6) 10', 28', 37', 40+3', 47', 62'; Flannery (1/1) 69'

Stadio Sergio Lanfranchi
Attendance: 1,000
Referee: Andrea Piardi (FIR)

== 2020–21 European Rugby Champions Cup ==
Munster were drawn in pool B for the 2020–21 European Rugby Champions Cup. Due to the changed competition format for the 2020–21 season, Munster played home-and-away fixtures against French side Clermont, who were the only French team to have ever won a Champions Cup game at Thomond Park at the time, and English side Harlequins, where former Munster player and coach Jerry Flannery was a coach.

Pool B

Team	P	W	D	L	PF	PA	Diff	TF	TA	TB	LB	Pts
(France) Lyon	2	2	0	0	83	10	+73	12	1	1	0	10
(France) Racing 92	2	2	0	0	75	29	+46	11	4	2	0	10
(France) Toulouse	2	2	0	0	57	22	+35	8	3	2	0	10
(Ireland) Munster	2	2	0	0	60	38	+22	5	5	0	0	8
(France) Clermont	2	1	0	1	82	77	+5	11	8	2	0	6
(England) Bristol Bears	2	1	0	1	65	69	-4	9	9	2	0	6
(England) Exeter Chiefs	2	1	0	1	42	28	+14	6	4	1	0	5
(England) Gloucester	2	1	0	1	48	89	-41	6	12	1	0	5
(Ireland) Ulster	2	0	0	2	56	67	-11	7	9	1	2	3
(Ireland) Connacht	2	0	0	2	40	53	-13	5	8	0	1	1
(England) Harlequins	2	0	0	2	14	70	-56	2	9	0	0	0
(Scotland) Glasgow Warriors	2	0	0	2	0	70	-70	0	10	0	0	0

Key to colours
Top 8 of each pool, advance to last 16.
Teams 5–8 in pool advance to 2020–21 European Rugby Challenge Cup quarter-finals.

=== Round 1 ===
13 December 2020
17:30

Munster (Ireland)	21–7	(England) Harlequins
Try: Penalty try 49'; G. Coombes 69' m Pen: Hanrahan (2/3) 12', 37'; Healy (1/1) 62'	Report; Report	Try: Murley 55' c Con: Smith (1/1) 56'

Thomond Park
Attendance: 0
Referee: Pascal Gaüzère (FFR)

=== Round 2 ===
19 December 2020
17:30

(1 BP) Clermont (France)	31–39	(Ireland) Munster
Try: Raka 0' c Penalty try 6'; Penaud 14' c Fourcade 23' c Con: Lopez (3/3) 1', 15', 25'; Pen: Lopez (1/1) 60'	Report; Report	Try: Haley 28' c Stander 69' c O'Byrne 77' c Con: Hanrahan (3/3) 29', 71', 77'; Pen: Hanrahan (6/6) 4', 8', 19', 43', 52', 57'

Stade Marcel-Michelin
Attendance: 0
Referee: Matthew Carley (RFU)

=== Round 3 ===
16 January 2021
17:30

Munster (Ireland)	Cancelled	(France) Clermont

Thomond Park

=== Round 4 ===
23 January 2021
18:30

Harlequins (England)	Cancelled	(Ireland) Munster

The Stoop

=== Last 16 ===
3 April 2021
15:00

Munster (Ireland)	33–40	(France) Toulouse
Try: Earls (2) 24' m, 27' m G. Coombes (2) 50' c, 80' c Con: Carbery (1/3) 51'; Casey (1/1) 80'; Pen: Carbery (2/2) 14', 40+1'; Hanrahan (1/1) 65'	Report; Report	Try: Lebel 42' c Marchand 54' c Dupont (2) 67' c, 76' c Con: Ntamack (4/4) 43', 55', 68', 77'; Pen: Ntamack (4/6) 3', 16', 30', 75'

Thomond Park
Attendance: 0
Referee: Wayne Barnes (RFU)
