= 2019–20 Munster Rugby season =

- Ground(s): Thomond Park (Capacity: 25,600); Irish Independent Park (Capacity: 8,008)
- Chairman: Gerry O'Shea
- CEO: Ian Flanagan
- President: Michael Keane
- Coach: Johann van Graan
- Captain: Peter O'Mahony
- Most appearances: Rory Scannell (21)
- Top scorer: JJ Hanrahan (171)
- Most tries: Andrew Conway (8)
- League: Pro14
- 2019–20: 2nd (Conf. B), Semi-finals

The 2019–20 Munster Rugby season was Munster's nineteenth season competing in the Pro14, alongside which they also competed in the European Rugby Champions Cup. It was Johann van Graan's third season as head coach.

== Events ==
Backs coach Felix Jones and forwards coach Jerry Flannery left the province when their contracts expired in June 2019. Graham Rowntree joined the province as their new forwards coach after the completion of his duties with Georgia at the 2019 Rugby World Cup. Stephen Larkham, attack coach for the Australian national team, also joined the province as a senior coach ahead of the 2019–20 season.

Club legend and head of commercial and marketing, Doug Howlett, also left the province to return to New Zealand in the summer of 2019, ending his 11-year association with Munster. Munster's CEO Garrett Fitzgerald retired upon reaching retirement age in June 2019. Fitzgerald was Munster's first CEO and had been in the post since 1999, making him the longest serving provincial chief executive in Irish rugby at the time. Ian Flanagan, who was born in Cork and previously worked at Leicester City F.C, was appointed to replace Fitzgerald.

In a change from the previous two seasons, Munster were in conference B for the 2019–20 Pro14 season, alongside Benetton, Cardiff Blues, Connacht, Edinburgh, Scarlets and Southern Kings. This will also be the case for the 2020–21 season, and the change was made based on the points total each club achieved after the completion of the regular 2018–19 season.

Munster opened their 2019–20 Pro14 season with a 39–9 home victory against Welsh side Dragons on 28 September 2019, with the tries coming from Arno Botha, Jack O'Donoghue, Man-of-the-Match Shane Daly, Tyler Bleyendaal and academy member Diarmuid Barron, and fly-half JJ Hanrahan contributing 14 points off the kicking tee. New signing Nick McCarthy and academy members Keynan Knox and Jack O'Sullivan all made their senior competitive debuts for the province, and hooker Kevin O'Byrne won his 50th cap. Short-term signing Jed Holloway made his debut for the province in their 31–20 away win against South African side Southern Kings on 5 October 2019.

In the opening two rounds of the 2019–20 Champions Cup, Munster beat Welsh Pro14 rivals Ospreys 32–13 away from home on 16 November 2019, with tries from Jeremy Loughman, Keith Earls, Andrew Conway and James Cronin and twelve points off the kicking tee from Tyler Bleyendaal, before drawing 21–21 at home against French side Racing 92 on 23 November 2019; Munster's tries came from Keith Earls and Andrew Conway, and JJ Hanrahan contributed eleven points with the boot. The draw was Munster's first at home in the Champions Cup, against a Racing side that included former Munster players Donnacha Ryan and Simon Zebo in their starting XV.

Prop Stephen Archer won his 200th cap for Munster in their 2019–20 Pro14 round 7 fixture against Edinburgh on 29 November 2019, becoming the eleventh player to achieve the accolade for the province. Academy fly-half Ben Healy made his debut for Munster during the same game, scoring 11 points in the 18–16 defeat to the Scottish side.

In the Champions Cup back-to-backs against defending champions Saracens, Munster won 10–3 at home on 7 December 2019, with the English side picking up a losing bonus point. In the return fixture one week later, Munster were beaten 15–6, with two tries in the final quarter securing the win for Saracens and denying Munster a losing bonus point.

Following an incident that triggered a large brawl in Munster's second fixture against Saracens in December 2019 and a complaint to the EPCR from Saracens, in which Munster team doctor Jamie Kearns was accused of verbally abusing Saracens hooker Jamie George, an independent panel upheld the complaint and found that Kearns had breached the EPCR's disciplinary rules, handing Kearns a three-week ban, suspended for 12 months, and a fine of €2,000 to be paid immediately.

Munster went into their round 5 Champions Cup clash away to Racing 92 on 12 January 2020 knowing that they had to win to keep alive their hopes of progressing to the quarter-finals of the tournament, but despite leading the French club with ten minutes to go, late tries from Racing secured a 39–22 win for the home side. Munster needed results elsewhere to go their way if they were to stand any chance of qualifying for the quarter-finals as the final round of pool matches took place, but Glasgow Warriors 45–7 win against Sale Sharks ended those hopes before Munster's final game against Ospreys had even taken place. In the event, Munster won 33–6 against Ospreys, with Craig Casey, who made his European debut for the province in the defeat to Racing, scoring his first try for Munster, and Calvin Nash, Jack O'Sullivan and Ben Healy making their European debuts for the province.

Munster's 68–3 win against South African side Southern Kings in round 11 of the Pro14 on 14 February 2020 was a record margin of victory for the province in the competition, and the ten tries scored also set a new record for the province. Academy member John Hodnett made his debut for Munster in the fixture, scoring a try and earning the Man-of-the-Match award. The match had an added poignancy for Munster, as their long-serving former CEO, Garrett Fitzgerald, who had only retired in June 2019, died following a battle with illness earlier that day.

The 2019–20 Pro14 was suspended indefinitely by tournament organisers on 12 March 2020 in response to the ongoing coronavirus pandemic. Munster's round 14 and 15 fixtures against Italian side Benetton had already been postponed. Tyler Bleyendaal was forced to retire from playing rugby with immediate effect in May 2020 due to a persistent neck injury. In the same month, prop Brian Scott was also forced to retire with immediate effect due to injury. The regular season resumed on 22 August 2020, with the number of rounds reduced from 21 to 15 and any games postponed prior to the indefinite suspension of the season being deemed as 0–0 draws and both teams awarded two points. Rounds 14 and 15 took place as derbies in each territory, with the top two teams in each conference progressing to a semi-final stage.

Munster resumed their season on 22 August 2020 with a fixture against Leinster in the Aviva Stadium, which Leinster won 27–25. Munster handed debuts to new signings Damian de Allende and RG Snyman, though Snyman's first appearance for the province lasted only 7 minutes after he was injured during a lineout. Andrew Conway scored tries either side of Keith Earls' try, with JJ Hanrahan kicking 10 points off the tee, and Chris Farrell won the Man-of-the-Match award.

Munster completed their reduced 15 round Pro14 regular season with a seven try 49–12 win against Connacht, a victory that secured a semi-final against defending champions and provincial rivals Leinster on 4 September 2020. The tries came from Chris Cloete, Jeremy Loughman, Tadhg Beirne, James Cronin, two from Andrew Conway and a penalty try, with JJ Hanrahan kicking all five of his conversions and Rory Scannell converting the final try. As well as getting on the scoresheet, Tadhg Beirne also won the Man-of-the-Match award on his first game back after fracturing an ankle against Saracens in December 2019. Leinster won the semi-final 13–3, knocking Munster out at the semi-final stage of the Pro14 for the third season in a row and bringing an end to Munster's 2019–20 season.

A total of 51 players were used during the marathon season, with seven academy members earning minutes for the province: Diarmuid Barron, Liam Coombes, Jake Flannery, Ben Healy, John Hodnett, Keynan Knox and Jack O'Sullivan. Healy and O'Sullivan also made their Champions Cups debuts during the season, alongside senior players Craig Casey, Shane Daly and Calvin Nash. Stephen Archer surpassed the 200-cap mark for the province, with John Ryan winning his 150th cap, Niall Scannell his 100th and Dan Goggin his 50th. Aside from squad captain Peter O'Mahony, Billy Holland, Jack O'Donoghue, Tommy O'Donnell, Niall Scannell and CJ Stander also captained the province. Rory Scannell made the most appearances during the season with 21, and also played the most minutes (1,276). JJ Hanrahan was the top points scorer with 171, and Andrew Conway was the top try scorer with 8.

Munster's home game against Leinster in December 2019 was a record-equalling attendance for Thomond Park, with additional seating bumping the crowd up to 26,267. All three of Munster's home Champions Cup fixtures were the highest attendances for their respective rounds.

Internationally, 12 Munster players represented Ireland at the 2019 Rugby World Cup: Tadhg Beirne, Joey Carbery, Andrew Conway, Keith Earls, Chris Farrell, Dave Kilcoyne, Jean Kleyn, Conor Murray, Peter O'Mahony, John Ryan, Niall Scannell and CJ Stander. Conway, Earls, Kilcoyne, Murray, O'Mahony and Stander also featured for Ireland in the 2020 Six Nations Championship. Three Munster players also represented Ireland under-20s in the Under-20s Six Nations: Tom Ahern, Jack Crowley and Ciaran Ryan.

At the delayed end of season awards in November 2020, Jack O'Sullivan won the John McCarthy Award for Academy Player of the Year, Shane Daly won the Young Player of the Year award and CJ Stander won Player of the Year for a third time, whilst Garrett Fitzgerald, Munster's former CEO who died in February 2020, was inducted into Munster's Hall of Fame.

== Coaching and management staff ==
Position	Name	Nationality
Head coach	Johann van Graan	South Africa
Senior coach	Stephen Larkham	Australia
Defence coach	JP Ferreira	South Africa
Forwards coach	Graham Rowntree	England
Team manager	Niall O'Donovan	Ireland
Head of athletic performance	Denis Logan	United States
Strength and conditioning coach	Damien O'Donoghue	Ireland
Strength and conditioning coach	Adam Sheehan	Ireland
Performance analyst	George Murray	Ireland

== Players ==
=== Senior squad ===
Munster Rugby senior squad (Note: Alex Wootton is contracted to Munster for the 2020/21 season, but is on a season-long loan at Connacht.)
**Props**: (Ireland) **Stephen Archer**; (Ireland) **James Cronin**; (Ireland) **Dave Kilcoyne**; (South Africa) Keynan Knox*; (Ireland) Jeremy Loughman; (Ireland) Liam O'Connor; (Ireland) **John Ryan**; (United States) Roman Salanoa*; (Ireland) Brian Scott; **Hookers**: (Ireland) Diarmuid Barron; (New Zealand) Rhys Marshall*; (Ireland) Kevin O'Byrne; (Ireland) **Niall Scannell**; **Locks**: (Ireland) **Tadhg Beirne**; (Ireland) **Billy Holland**; (Australia) Jed Holloway ^{ST}; (Ireland) **Jean Kleyn**; (South Africa) **RG Snyman**; (Ireland) Fineen Wycherley	**Back row**: (South Africa) Chris Cloete*; (Ireland) Gavin Coombes; (Ireland) **Tommy O'Donnell**; (Ireland) **Jack O'Donoghue**; (Ireland) **Peter O'Mahony** (c); (Ireland) Jack O'Sullivan; (Ireland) **CJ Stander**; **Scrum-halves**: (Ireland) Craig Casey; (Ireland) Neil Cronin; (New Zealand) Alby Mathewson; (Ireland) Nick McCarthy; (Ireland) **Conor Murray**; **Fly-halves**: (New Zealand) Tyler Bleyendaal*; (Ireland) **Joey Carbery**; (Ireland) JJ Hanrahan	**Centres**: (Ireland) Shane Daly; (South Africa) **Damian de Allende**; (Ireland) **Chris Farrell**; (Ireland) Dan Goggin; (Ireland) Alex McHenry; (Ireland) **Rory Scannell**; **Wings**: (Ireland) **Andrew Conway**; (Ireland) Liam Coombes; (Ireland) **Keith Earls**; (Ireland) Calvin Nash; (Ireland) **Darren Sweetnam**; **Fullbacks**: (England) Matt Gallagher*; (Ireland) **Mike Haley**
(c) denotes the team captain, **Bold** denotes internationally capped players.^{*} denotes players qualified to play for Ireland on residency or dual nationality.^{ST} denotes a short-term signing. Italics indicate players signed during mid-season break. Players and their allocated positions from the Munster Rugby website.

=== Academy squad ===
Munster Rugby academy squad
**Props**: (Ireland) James French **(3)**; (Ireland) Josh Wycherley **(3)**; **Hookers**: (Ireland) Scott Buckley **(1)**; (Ireland) Eoghan Clarke **(3)**; **Locks**: (Ireland) Thomas Ahern **(3)**; (Ireland) Paddy Kelly **(2)**; (Ireland) Eoin O'Connor **(2)**	**Back row**: (Ireland) Jack Daly **(3)**; (Ireland) John Hodnett **(2)**; (Ireland) Alex Kendellen **(1)**; **Scrum-halves**: None; **Fly-halves**: (Ireland) Jack Crowley **(1)**; (Ireland) Jake Flannery **(2)**; (Ireland) Ben Healy **(3)**	**Centres**: (Ireland) Seán French **(3)**; **Wings**: None; **Fullbacks**: (Ireland) Jonathan Wren **(3)**
(c) denotes the team captain, **Bold** denotes internationally capped players, number in brackets indicates players stage in the three-year academy cycle.^{*} denotes players qualified to play for Ireland on residency or dual nationality. Players and their allocated positions from the Munster Rugby website.

== Senior team transfers ==
Unlike previous seasons, where the majority of transfers take place during the summer pre-season, the 2019–20 season was unusual in that it had two separate periods of transfer activity due to the mid-season break in response to the COVID-19 pandemic. Players scheduled to join clubs ahead of the commencement of the 2020–21 season where instead able to join their new club during this break, meaning they were available for the completion of the 2019–20 season.

=== October 2018 – May 2020 ===
Players in

- (Ireland) Gavin Coombes promoted from Academy
- (Ireland) Shane Daly promoted from Academy
- (Ireland) Nick McCarthy from (Ireland) Leinster
- (Ireland) Seán O'Connor promoted from Academy
- (Ireland) Craig Casey promoted from Academy
- (Australia) Jed Holloway from (Australia) Waratahs (Two-month contract)

Players out

- (Ireland) Stephen Fitzgerald to (Ireland) Connacht
- (South Africa) Jaco Taute to (England) Leicester Tigers
- (Ireland) Duncan Williams released
- (Ireland) Bill Johnston to (Ireland) Ulster
- (Ireland) James Hart to (France) Biarritz
- (Ireland) Dave O'Callaghan to (France) Biarritz
- (Ireland) Mike Sherry retired
- (New Zealand) Alby Mathewson released
- (New Zealand) Tyler Bleyendaal retired
- (Ireland) Brian Scott retired

=== February 2019 – July 2020 ===
Players in

- (South Africa) Keynan Knox promoted from Academy
- (Ireland) Liam Coombes promoted from Academy
- (Ireland) Alex McHenry promoted from Academy
- (Ireland) Jack O'Sullivan promoted from Academy
- (South Africa) Damian de Allende from (Japan) Panasonic Wild Knights
- (England) Matt Gallagher from (England) Saracens
- (South Africa) RG Snyman from (Japan) Honda Heat
- (United States) Roman Salanoa from (Ireland) Leinster
- (Ireland) Diarmuid Barron promoted from Academy

Players out

- (South Africa) Arno Botha to (South Africa) Bulls
- (Ireland) Sammy Arnold to (Ireland) Connacht
- (Ireland) Conor Oliver to (Ireland) Connacht
- (Ireland) Seán O'Connor to Jersey Reds
- (England) Ciaran Parker to Jersey Reds
- (Ireland) Alex Wootton to (Ireland) Connacht (season-long loan)
- (Ireland) Darren O'Shea to (France) Vannes

== Pre-season ==
13 September 2019
19:30

Munster (Ireland)	45–5	(England) London Irish
	Report

Irish Independent Park
Attendance: 5,678

21 September 2019
15:00

Connacht (Ireland)	40–31	(Ireland) Munster
	Report

Galway Sportsgrounds
Attendance: 4,738

== 2019–20 Pro14 ==
2019–20 Pro14 table
Conference A
	Team	P	W	D	L	PF	PA	PD	TF	TA	TBP	LBP	PTS
1	(Ireland) Leinster (CH)	15	15	0	0	531	216	+315	74	28	9	0	69
2	(Ireland) Ulster (RU)	15	8	1	6	385	306	+79	50	40	7	3	44 (Note: Ulster deducted 1 point for administration error regarding Ian Madigan.)
3	(Scotland) Glasgow Warriors	15	8	0	7	364	329	+35	53	42	5	1	38
4	(South Africa) Cheetahs	13	6	0	7	342	280	+62	48	32	5	2	32
5	(Wales) Dragons	15	5	1	9	283	415	–132	32	49	1	1	24
6	(Italy) Zebre	15	3	1	11	230	399	–169	29	56	4	3	21
7	(Wales) Ospreys	15	2	2	11	205	375	–170	21	45	1	4	17
Conference B
	Team	P	W	D	L	PF	PA	PD	TF	TA	TBP	LBP	PTS
1	(Scotland) Edinburgh (SF)	15	11	0	4	391	225	+166	47	27	5	2	51
2	(Ireland) Munster (SF)	15	10	0	5	426	255	+171	53	26	8	3	51
3	(Wales) Scarlets	15	10	0	5	354	274	+80	46	34	5	2	47
4	(Ireland) Connacht	15	8	0	7	302	360	–58	41	48	7	1	40
5	(Italy) Benetton	15	6	1	8	309	350	–41	35	42	5	5	36
6	(Wales) Cardiff Blues	15	7	0	8	283	327	–44	30	38	3	2	33
7	(South Africa) Southern Kings	13	1	0	12	204	498	–294	23	75	0	3	7
If teams are level at any stage, tiebreakers are applied in the following order -: 1. number of matches won 2. the difference between points for and points against 3. the number of tries scored 4. the most points scored 5. the difference between tries for and tries against 6. the fewest red cards received 7. the fewest yellow cards received
Green background indicates teams that compete in the Pro14 play-offs, and also earn a place in the 2020–21 European Champions Cup Blue background indicates teams outside the play-off places that earn a place in the 2020–21 European Champions Cup; Red background indicates teams ineligible for European cup tournaments Plain background indicates teams that earn a place in the 2020–21 European Rugby Challenge Cup. (CH) Champions. (RU) Runners-up. (SF) Losing semi-finalists. (Q) Qualified for Pro14 play-off semi-finals. (e) Cannot reach play-offs.

=== Round 1 ===
28 September 2019
15:00

(1 BP) Munster (Ireland)	39–9	(Wales) Dragons
Try: Botha 16' c O'Donoghue 32' c S. Daly 34' m Bleyendaal 60' c Barron 78' c Con: Hanrahan (4/5) 17', 32', 61', 79'; Pen: Hanrahan (2/2) 24', 42'	Report; Report	Pen: S. Davies (3/4) 2', 28', 39'

Thomond Park
Attendance: 10,878
Referee: Ben Blain (SRU)

=== Round 2 ===
5 October 2019
15:00

Southern Kings (South Africa)	20–31	(Ireland) Munster (1 BP)
Try: Ungerer 41' c Louw 77' c Con: Catrakilis (2/2) 43', 78'; Pen: Catrakilis (2/3) 14', 26'	Report; Report	Try: Haley 19' c Mathewson 50' c F. Wycherley 67' c Botha 69' c Con: Hanrahan (4/4) 21', 51', 67', 71'; Pen: Hanrahan (1/1) 9'

Nelson Mandela Bay Stadium
Attendance: 3,115
Referee: Dan Jones (WRU)

=== Round 3 ===
11 October 2019
17:15

(1 BP) Cheetahs (South Africa)	40–16	(Ireland) Munster
Try: Nché 9' c Pokomela 32' m Small-Smith 45' c Dweba 55' c Wiese 71' c Smith 80' c Con: Pienaar (4/5) 10', 46', 56', 72'; Schoeman (1/1) 80'+1	Report; Report	Try: Goggin 74' c Con: Hanrahan (1/1) 75'; Pen: Bleyendaal (3/4) 21', 27', 39'

Toyota Stadium
Attendance: 4,814
Referee: Mike Adamson (SRU)

=== Round 4 ===
25 October 2019
19:35

(1 BP) Munster (Ireland)	28–12	(Wales) Ospreys
Try: J. Cronin 16' c Marshall 42' c Haley 49' c Botha 79' c Con: Bleyendaal (3/3) 17', 43', 50'; Hanrahan (1/1) 80'	Report; Report	Pen: Price (4/4) 32', 39', 48', 58'

Irish Independent Park
Attendance: 7,311
Referee: Stuart Berry (SARU)

=== Round 5 ===
2 November 2019
19:35

Cardiff Blues (Wales)	23–33	(Ireland) Munster (1 BP)
Try: Domachowski 40'+4 c N. Williams 78' c Con: Evans (1/1) 40'+4; Tovey (1/1) 79'; Pen: Evans (3/3) 7', 15', 47'	Report; Report	Try: Cloete 23' c Mathewson (2) 49' c, 66' m Nash 59' m Con: Hanrahan (2/4) 25', 50'; Pen: Hanrahan (3/3) 13', 31', 73'

Cardiff Arms Park
Attendance: 5,256
Referee: Stuart Berry (SARU)

=== Round 6 ===
9 November 2019
17:15

Munster (Ireland)	22–16	(Ireland) Ulster (1 BP)
Try: Stander 14' c R. Scannell 35' m Conway 64' c Con: Hanrahan (1/1) 14'; Bleyendaal (1/2) 66'; Pen: Hanrahan (1/1) 25'	Report; Report	Try: Herring 49' c Con: Cooney (1/1) 51'; Pen: Cooney (3/4) 3', 19', 57'

Thomond Park
Attendance: 14,436
Referee: Frank Murphy (IRFU)

=== Round 7 ===
29 November 2019
19:35

(1 BP) Munster (Ireland)	16–18	(Scotland) Edinburgh
Try: O'Donnell 35' c Con: Healy (1/1) 35'; Pen: Healy (3/3) 23', 41', 53'	Report; Report	Try: Scott 1' c Sau 62' m Con: Van der Walt (1/1) 2'; Pen: Van der Walt (1/1) 20'; Hickey (1/1) 56'

Irish Independent Park
Attendance: 7,580
Referee: Marius Mitrea (FIR)

=== Round 8 ===
21 December 2019
17:15

(1 BP) Connacht (Ireland)	14–19	(Ireland) Munster
Try: J. Carty 72' m Pen: C. Fitzgerald (3/3) 17', 28', 40'	Report; Report	Try: O'Donoghue 24' c Con: Hanrahan (1/1) 25'; Pen: Hanrahan (4/4) 8', 20', 31', 44'

Galway Sportsgrounds
Attendance: 8,129
Referee: Andrew Brace (IRFU)

=== Round 9 ===
28 December 2019
18:00

(1 BP) Munster (Ireland)	6–13	(Ireland) Leinster
Pen: Hanrahan (2/2) 39', 45'	Report; Report	Try: E. Byrne 9' c Con: R. Byrne (1/1) 10'; Pen: R. Byrne (1/1) 22', 33'

Thomond Park
Attendance: 26,267
Referee: Frank Murphy (IRFU)

=== Round 10 ===
3 January 2020
19:35

(1 BP) Ulster (Ireland)	38–17	(Ireland) Munster
Try: Cooney 17' c Baloucoune 34' c Mat. Rea 42' c McCloskey 57' c Stockdale 61' c Con: Cooney (5/5) 18', 35', 43', 58', 62'; Pen: Cooney (1/1) 14'	Report; Report	Try: S. Daly 9' c N. Scannell 65' c Con: Carbery (2/2) 10', 65'; Pen: Carbery (1/1) 39'

Kingspan Stadium
Attendance: 17,461
Referee: Dan Jones (WRU)

=== Round 11 ===
14 February 2020
19:35

(1 BP) Munster (Ireland)	68–3	(South Africa) Southern Kings
Try: Botha (3) 8' c, 28' c, 75' c Nash 22' c O'Donoghue 40'+1 c Hodnett 49' c N. Cronin 54' c S. Daly (2) 60' c, 77' c Goggin 73' m Con: Hanrahan (6/6) 9', 23', 29', 40'+2, 50', 55'; Healy (3/4) 62', 76', 78'	Report; Report	Pen: Catrakilis (1/1) 16'

Irish Independent Park
Attendance: 6,854
Referee: Nikoloz Amashukeli (GRU)

=== Round 12 ===
21 February 2020
19:35

Zebre (Italy)	0–28	(Ireland) Munster (1 BP)
	Report; Report	Try: Nash 10' c Hanrahan 52' c R. Scannell 56' c Sweetnam 73' c Con: Hanrahan (4/4) 12', 53', 58', 74'

Stadio Giovanni Mari
Attendance: 3,300
Referee: Dan Jones (WRU)

=== Round 13 ===
29 February 2020
17:00

(1 BP) Munster (Ireland)	29–10	(Wales) Scarlets
Try: O'Sullivan 34' c Holland 51' m G. Coombes (2) 71' c, 80'+4 c Con: Hanrahan (3/4) 35', 73', 80'+5; Pen: Hanrahan (1/1) 23'	Report; Report	Try: Sebastian 60' c Con: D. Jones (1/1) 61'; Pen: D. Jones (1/1) 7'

Thomond Park
Attendance: 13,554
Referee: Mike Adamson (SRU)

=== Round 14 ===
22 August 2020
19:35

Leinster (Ireland)	27–25	(Ireland) Munster (1 BP)
Try: Healy 19' c Ringrose 39' c Lowe 50' c Con: Sexton (3/3) 21', 40', 52'; Pen: Sexton (1/1) 31'; R. Byrne (1/1) 69'	Report; Report	Try: Conway (2) 12' c, 71' m Earls 64' c Con: Hanrahan (2/3) 13', 65'; Pen: Hanrahan (2/2) 26', 35'

Aviva Stadium
Attendance: 0 (Note: This game was played behind closed doors due to COVID-19 restrictions.)
Referee: Andrew Brace (IRFU)

=== Round 15 ===
30 August 2020
15:00

(1 BP) Munster (Ireland)	49–12	(Ireland) Connacht
Try: Cloete 8' c Penalty try 15' c Loughman 36' c Beirne 49' c Conway (2) 51' c, 53' c J. Cronin 67' c Con: Hanrahan (5/5) 9', 37', 50', 51', 55'; R. Scannell (1/1) 68'	Report; Report	Try: Aki 40'+7; Murphy 70' m Con: C. Fitzgerald (1/1) 40'+8

Aviva Stadium
Attendance: 0
Referee: Frank Murphy (IRFU)

=== Semi-final ===
4 September 2020
19:35

Leinster (Ireland)	13–3	(Ireland) Munster
Try: R. Kelleher 27' c Con: Sexton (1/1) 28'; Pen: Sexton (2/3) 40', 67'	Report; Report	Pen: Hanrahan (1/3) 5'

Aviva Stadium
Attendance: 0
Referee: Andrew Brace (IRFU)

== 2019–20 European Rugby Champions Cup ==
Munster were seeded in tier 2 when the draw for the 2019–20 European Rugby Champions Cup was made in Lausanne, Switzerland on Wednesday 19 June 2019, and were drawn in pool 4 alongside defending champions Saracens, Racing 92, who count former Munster players Donnacha Ryan and Simon Zebo amongst their squad, and fellow Pro14 side Ospreys.

Team	P	W	D	L	PF	PA	Diff	TF	TA	TB	LB	Pts
(France) Racing 92 (5)	6	4	1	1	194	126	68	26	15	4	1	23
(England) Saracens (8)	6	4	0	2	121	88	33	13	10	1	1	18
(Ireland) Munster	6	3	1	2	124	97	27	13	10	2	0	16
(Wales) Ospreys	6	0	0	6	83	211	–128	11	28	1	1	2

=== Round 1 ===
16 November 2019
17:30

Ospreys (Wales)	13–32	(Ireland) Munster (1 BP)
Try: A. Davies 77' c Con: Price (1/1) 78'; Pen: Price (2/2) 7', 28'	Report	Try: Loughman 33' c Earls 49' m Conway 51' c J. Cronin 80'+4; Con: Bleyendaal (3/4) 34', 52', 80'+5; Pen: Bleyendaal (2/2) 15', 19'

Liberty Stadium
Attendance: 7,295
Referee: Karl Dickson (RFU)

=== Round 2 ===
23 November 2019
17:30

Munster (Ireland)	21–21	(France) Racing 92
Try: Earls 39' m Conway 74' c Con: Hanrahan (1/2) 75'; Pen: Hanrahan (3/3) 8', 26', 46'	Report	Try: Russell 18' c Thomas 28' c Imhoff 47' c Con: Iribaren (3/3) 19', 29', 48'

Thomond Park
Attendance: 25,600
Referee: Matthew Carley (RFU)

=== Round 3 ===
7 December 2019
17:30

Munster (Ireland)	10–3	(England) Saracens (1 BP)
Try: O'Mahony 30' c Con: Hanrahan (1/1) 31'; Pen: Hanrahan (1/1) 17'	Report	Pen: Spencer (1/3) 36'

Thomond Park
Attendance: 25,034
Referee: Romain Poite (FFR)

=== Round 4 ===
14 December 2019
15:00

Saracens (England)	15–6	(Ireland) Munster
Try: Maitland 65' m Mak. Vunipola 71' c Con: Farrell (1/2) 72'; Pen: Farrell (1/2) 7'	Report	Pen: Hanrahan (2/3) 24', 43'

Allianz Park
Attendance: 8,500
Referee: Pascal Gaüzère (FFR)

=== Round 5 ===
12 January 2020
15:15

(1 BP) Racing 92 (France)	39–22	(Ireland) Munster
Try: Thomas (2) 28' m, 71' m Vakatawa 76' c Imhoff 80' c Con: Machenaud (2/3) 77', 80'+2; Pen: Iribaren (5/5) 19', 32', 46', 53', 57'	Report	Try: Conway 37' c Con: Hanrahan (1/1) 38'; Pen: Hanrahan (5/6) 3', 10', 17', 49', 63'

Paris La Défense Arena
Attendance: 18,000
Referee: Wayne Barnes (RFU)

=== Round 6 ===
19 January 2020
13:00

(1 BP) Munster (Ireland)	33–6	(Wales) Ospreys
Try: Stander (2) 30' c, 77' c Archer 39' c Murray 46' m Casey 58' c Con: Hanrahan (4/5) 31', 40', 59', 78'	Report	Pen: Price (2/2) 7', 13'

Thomond Park
Attendance: 19,891
Referee: Mathieu Raynal (FFR)
