= 2022–23 Munster Rugby season =

- Ground(s): Thomond Park (Capacity: 25,600) (Note: Thomond Park's official capacity is 25,600 but can be expanded up to 26,276 with temporary seating.); Musgrave Park (Capacity: 8,008)
- Chairman: Gerry O'Shea
- CEO: Ian Flanagan
- President: Ger McNamara
- Coach: Graham Rowntree
- Captain: Peter O'Mahony
- Most appearances: Two players: Jean Kleyn (24); Shane Daly (24)
- Top scorer: Joey Carbery (124)
- Most tries: Gavin Coombes (14)
- League: United Rugby Championship
- 2022–23 United Rugby Championship: Champions; 3rd, Irish Shield (5th overall)

The 2022–23 Munster Rugby season was Munster's twenty-second season competing in the United Rugby Championship, alongside which they competed in the European Rugby Champions Cup. It was Graham Rowntree's first season as head coach following his promotion.

== Events ==
Head coach Johann van Graan, who joined Munster in November 2017, confirmed in December 2021 that he would be leaving the province at the end of the 2021–22 season to join English club Bath. In addition to this, senior coach Stephen Larkham also left the province to return home to Australia to become head coach of the Brumbies, and defence coach JP Ferreira followed van Graan to join Bath. However, forwards coach Graham Rowntree extended his stay with the province by a further two years, and the province confirmed in April 2022 that Rowntree would be promoted to head coach from the 2022–23 season. Mike Prendergast, a former scrum-half for the province, joined Rowntree's coaching setup as the attack coach on a three-year contract, having most recently fulfilled a similar role for French club Racing 92. Andi Kyriacou, who had joined the province in April 2021 as an elite player development officer with the academy, was promoted to forwards coach with the senior squad on a two-year contract, and former Munster player Denis Leamy returned to the province as defence coach on a three-year contract. Three additions were also made to the academy staff, with former players Brendan O'Connor and Tommy O'Donnell joining as elite player development officers and Matt Brown joining as pathway development coach.

In player news, Munster's marquee signing ahead of the commencement of the season was centre Malakai Fekitoa, who won the 2015 Rugby World Cup with New Zealand before reverting his international allegiance to his native Tonga. Irish-qualified hooker Chris Moore joined from Exeter University, and five players were promoted from the academy to the senior squad: hooker Scott Buckley, lock Paddy Kelly, back-rower Alex Kendellen, lock Eoin O'Connor, and scrum-half Paddy Patterson. Centre Antoine Frisch, who is Irish-qualified, also joined the province from English club Bristol Bears. Six players joined year one of Munster's academy programme ahead of the season: props Darragh McSweeney and Kieran Ryan, lock Evan O'Connell, back-row Ruadhán Quinn, scrum-half Jack Oliver and centre Fionn Gibbons.

Hooker Declan Moore left the province to join Ulster on a permanent basis, having spent time on loan at the northern province during the previous season. Fly-half Jake Flannery joined Moore in moving north to Ulster, whilst lock Jason Jenkins moved east to join Leinster after an injury-disrupted season at Munster, and fullback Matt Gallagher and flanker Chris Cloete joined former head coach Johann van Graan at Bath. Veteran prop John Ryan left to join English club Wasps, and hooker Kevin O'Byrne joined English RFU Championship club Ealing Trailfinders. Centre Alex McHenry and back-three Seán French left the province to join English Championship clubs Jersey Reds and Bedford Blues respectively, whilst scrum-half Rowan Osborne and academy back-three Jonathan Wren were both forced to retire due to injury, and South African world cup-winning centre Damian de Allende returned to Japanese domestic rugby with Saitama Wild Knights. Centre Chris Farrell was released from his contract with the province in early March 2023 to join French club Oyonnax, with prop James French and centre Dan Goggin also being released by the province in March 2023 to pursue a new playing opportunities.

Munster were drawn in pool B for the 2022–23 European Rugby Champions Cup and faced French club Toulouse, who have won the competition a record five times and have knocked Munster out of tournament in the previous two seasons, and English club Northampton Saints, who beat Munster in the 2000 Heineken Cup Final and last faced the province during the 2011–12 Heineken Cup pool stage.

Munster began pre-season with a 28–19 defeat at home to English club Gloucester on 26 August 2022. The following day, after the GAA Central Council unanimously backed the proposal, Munster confirmed they would face a South Africa XV in a friendly held at Cork GAA's 45,000-capacity Páirc Uí Chaoimh on 10 November 2022. It would be the first time Munster faced a South Africa representative team in the professional era – their last such meeting was in 1970 – and would also see former Munster coaches Rassie Erasmus and Jacques Nienaber return to the province for the first time since their departure in 2017. Munster's second and final pre-season fixture was a 19–14 defeat to London Irish on 2 September 2022.

Munster opened their 2022–23 United Rugby Championship season with a 20–13 defeat away to Cardiff on 17 September 2022. Cardiff lead 12–6 at half-time, with Ben Healy scoring Munster's points from two penalties, before a 62nd minute try from Jack O'Sullivan, converted by Jack Crowley, gave Munster a 13–12 lead. Cardiff's lead was restored by a 68th-minute penalty from Jarrod Evans and Aled Summerhill's 77th minute try sealed the home sides win. New signings Malakai Fekitoa and Antoine Frisch made their competitive debuts for the province in the fixture.

After a mounting number of injuries sustained prior to round seven of the United Rugby Championship, prop John Ryan returned to the province to provide tighthead prop cover on a three-month contract, having been made redundant following Wasps administration, Irish-qualified centre Oli Morris joined for the remainder of the season following Worcester Warriors administration, and lock Kiran McDonald joined on a three-month contract having also been made redundant at Wasps. After finishing his contract at the end of January 2023, Ryan will move to New Zealand to join Super Rugby team the Chiefs.

Munster's friendly against a South Africa XV went ahead on 10 November 2022. The match was a 41,400 sell-out at Páirc Uí Chaoimh, making it the largest attendance for a rugby match in the province, and saw Munster secure their first ever win against South Africa in a 28–14 victory. Winger Shane Daly opened the scoring in just the 2nd minute, with fly-half Ben Healy converting to give the home side a 7–0 lead. South Africa hit back in the 12th minute through an Aphelele Fassi try that was converted by Johan Goosen to level the score, but Munster struck back with tries from Simon Zebo and Diarmuid Barron, both converted by Healy, to head into half-time with a 21–7. Munster struck early in the second-half, with fullback Mike Haley scoring after just two minutes and Healy's fourth conversion of the night extending their lead to 28–7. South Africa scored their second try in the 62nd minute when Sikhumbuzo Notshe crossed the try-line, converted by Gianni Lombard, but the visitors were unable to mount a comeback and Munster hung on to earn a famous win.

Munster opened their 2022–23 Champions Cup campaign with an 18–13 defeat at home to French club Toulouse on 11 December 2022. Munster took the lead in the 9th minute through a Joey Carbery try (Munster's 500th in European competitive rugby), which the fly-half also converted, before Toulouse responded with a Matthis Lebel try in the 22nd minute, converted by Thomas Ramos, before a penalty from Ramos in the 29th minute extended the visitors lead, though a Carbery penalty in the 38th minute saw the teams level at 10–10 at half-time. Toulouse struck almost immediately in the second-half, with replacement Lucas Tauzin scoring a try in the 42nd minute. Ramos missed the conversion but scored a 71st-minute penalty to extend Toulouse's lead to eight points, but a second successful penalty from Carbery in the 74th minute brought Munster back to within losing bonus-point range, but the province was unable to take advantage of an Antoine Dupont yellow card in the final minutes of the game.

A huge defensive effort secured a 17–6 away win against Northampton Saints in round two of the Champions Cup on 18 December 2022. Number eight Gavin Coombes opened the scoring for Munster with a 13th minute try converted by fly-half Joey Carbery, before the home side got on the scoreboard with a 19th-minute penalty. Carbery scored a penalty of his own in the 26th minute, though Northampton hit back with their second penalty just two minutes later. Coombes crossed for his and Munster's second try in the 35th minute, again converted by Carbery, to leave the score at 17–6 at half-time. Munster had three players sin-binned during the second-half: Jack O'Donoghue, Craig Casey and Joey Carbery, and needed the aforementioned defensive effort to keep Northampton from narrowing the score and earn a hard-fought victory on the road.

In the reverse fixture against Northampton Saints on 14 January 2023, Munster raced to a 24–0 half-time lead thanks to two tries from Gavin Coombes and one try from Jack O'Donoghue, all converted by Joey Carbery, who also added one penalty, though O'Donoghue was sent-off for a high tackle during the half. What looked like a comfortable victory turned into a tense finish however, when Northampton mounted a comeback during the second-half, scoring 20 unanswered points to come within a try of winning the game themselves, but a 75th-minute penalty from Jack Crowley and some last-gasp defence secured the victory for Munster.

Munster's fourth and final Champions Cup pool stage fixture was away to Toulouse on 22 January 2023. The French club dominated possession and territory during the opening quarter of the match and were 11–0 ahead before Munster grew into the game. Flanker John Hodnett got Munster on the scoreboard with an unconverted 30th minute try, before a penalty from fly-half Joey Carbery saw the teams head into half-time with the score at 11–8. A superb team try finished by lock Tadhg Beirne in the 48th minute, again unconverted, gave Munster a slender 13–11 lead, but three second-half penalties from Toulouse fullback Melvyn Jaminet secured a closely-fought 20–16 win for the hosts.

That result and others meant that Munster faced an away trip to South African side the Sharks in the last 16. The hosts opened the scoring with an early penalty from Curwin Bosch, but Munster hit back with a try from Shane Daly, converted by Jack Crowley, to take the lead. Sharks struck back with a try of their own from Jaden Hendrikse, and each team scored one more try during the first-half - Eben Etzebeth for the Sharks and Dave Kilcoyne for Munster - to leave the score finely poised at 17–14 at half-time, however, the Sharks scored four unanswered tries - two from Bongi Mbonambi and one each from Werner Kok and Curwin Bosch - to storm into the lead. Munster managed three further tries from Diarmuid Barron, Mike Haley and Fineen Wycherley, but with the scoreboard and time against them, the result was beyond doubt and the Sharks advanced to the quarter-finals.

A 26–24 win against defending champions the Stormers and a 22–22 draw against the Sharks in Munster's final two fixtures of the regular 2022–23 United Rugby Championship season, both away from home, secured fifth place for the province in the league table, and they defeated Glasgow Warriors 14–5 away in the quarter-finals to set up a semi-final away to Leinster, whom Munster defeated 16–15 thanks to a late drop goal from Jack Crowley, setting up a final away to the Stormers on 27 May 2023, which Munster won 19–14 thanks to a late John Hodnett try to secure their fourth league title, their first trophy since the 2010–11 season and the first silverware of head coach Graham Rowntree's reign.

== Player movements ==
Below are the players who joined and left the Munster senior and academy squads ahead of the 2022–23 season. Italics indicates players that transferred during the 2022–23 season.

=== Senior squad ===
Players in

- (Ireland) Scott Buckley promoted from Academy
- (Ireland) Alex Kendellen promoted from Academy
- (Tonga) Malakai Fekitoa from (England) Wasps
- (Ireland) Paddy Kelly promoted from Academy
- (England) Chris Moore from (England) Exeter University
- (Ireland) Eoin O'Connor promoted from Academy
- (Ireland) Paddy Patterson promoted from Academy
- (France) Antoine Frisch from (England) Bristol Bears
- (England) Oli Morris from (England) Worcester Warriors (short-term contract)
- (Ireland) John Ryan from (England) Wasps (short-term contract)
- (Scotland) Kiran McDonald from (England) Wasps (short-term contract)

Players out

- (Australia) Declan Moore to (Ireland) Ulster
- (South Africa) Jason Jenkins to (Ireland) Leinster
- (England) Matt Gallagher to (England) Bath
- (Ireland) Jake Flannery to (Ireland) Ulster
- (South Africa) Chris Cloete to (England) Bath
- (Ireland) John Ryan to (England) Wasps
- (Ireland) Kevin O'Byrne to (England) Ealing
- (Ireland) Rowan Osborne retired
- (Ireland) Seán French to (England) Bedford Blues
- (Ireland) Alex McHenry to Jersey Reds
- (South Africa) Damian de Allende to (Japan) Saitama Wild Knights
- (Ireland) John Ryan to (New Zealand) Chiefs
- (Ireland) Chris Farrell to (France) Oyonnax
- (Ireland) James French released
- (Ireland) Dan Goggin released

=== Academy squad ===
Players in

- (Ireland) Fionn Gibbons
- (Ireland) Darragh McSweeney
- (Ireland) Evan O'Connell
- (Ireland) Jack Oliver
- (Ireland) Ruadhán Quinn
- (Ireland) Kieran Ryan

Players out

- (Ireland) Jonathan Wren retired

== Coaches and staff ==
Senior squad

Position	Name	Nationality
Head coach	Graham Rowntree	England
Attack coach	Mike Prendergast	Ireland
Forwards coach	Andi Kyriacou	England
Defence coach	Denis Leamy	Ireland
Team manager	Niall O'Donovan	Ireland
Head of athletic performance	Ged McNamara	Ireland
Strength and conditioning coach	Adam Sheehan	Ireland
Head of medical	Jamie Kearns	Ireland
Lead physiotherapist	Damien Mordan	Ireland
Physiotherapist	Keith Thornhill	Ireland
Physiotherapist	Ray McGinley	Ireland
Lead performance analyst	George Murray	Ireland
Performance analyst	Paul O'Brien	Ireland

Academy squad

Position	Name
Academy manager	Ian Costello
Elite player development officer	Brendan O'Connor
Elite player development officer	Tommy O'Donnell
Elite player development officer	Greig Oliver
Pathway development coach	Matt Brown
Provincial talent coach	Mark Butler
Lead academy athletic development coach	Danielle Cunningham
Academy performance analyst	Elliot Corcoran
Academy physio	Shane Malone
Academy performance nutritionist	Clare Farrell
Mental skills coach	Cathal Sheridan

== Players ==
=== Senior squad ===
Munster Rugby senior squad
**Props**: (Ireland) **Stephen Archer**; (Ireland) James French; (Ireland) **Dave Kilcoyne**; (South Africa) Keynan Knox*; (Ireland) **Jeremy Loughman**; (Ireland) Liam O'Connor; (Ireland) **John Ryan** ^{ST}; (Ireland) Roman Salanoa; (Ireland) Josh Wycherley; **Hookers**: (Ireland) Diarmuid Barron; (Ireland) Scott Buckley; (England) Chris Moore*; (Ireland) **Niall Scannell**; **Locks**: (Ireland) Thomas Ahern; (Ireland) **Tadhg Beirne**; (Ireland) Paddy Kelly; (Ireland) **Jean Kleyn**; (Scotland) Kiran McDonald ^{ST}; (Ireland) Eoin O'Connor; (South Africa) **RG Snyman**; (Ireland) **Fineen Wycherley**	**Back row**: (Ireland) **Gavin Coombes**; (Ireland) Jack Daly; (Ireland) John Hodnett; (Ireland) Alex Kendellen; (Ireland) **Jack O'Donoghue**; (Ireland) **Peter O'Mahony** (c); (Ireland) Jack O'Sullivan; **Scrum-halves**: (Ireland) **Craig Casey**; (Ireland) Neil Cronin; (Ireland) **Conor Murray**; (Ireland) Paddy Patterson; **Fly-halves**: (Ireland) **Joey Carbery**; (Ireland) **Jack Crowley**; (Scotland) **Ben Healy** (Note: Healy made his debut for Scotland on 18 March 2023, thereby changing his World Rugby-recognised affiliation from Irish to Scottish.)	**Centres**: (Ireland) **Chris Farrell**; (Tonga) **Malakai Fekitoa**; (Ireland) Antoine Frisch; (Ireland) Dan Goggin; (England) Oli Morris* ^{ST}; (Ireland) **Rory Scannell**; **Back three**: (Ireland) **Andrew Conway**; (Ireland) Liam Coombes; (Ireland) **Shane Daly**; (Ireland) **Keith Earls**; (Ireland) **Mike Haley**; (Ireland) Calvin Nash; (Ireland) **Simon Zebo**
(c) denotes the team captain, **Bold** denotes internationally capped players.^{*} denotes players qualified to play for Ireland on residency or dual nationality.^{ST} denotes a short-term signing.^{L} denotes a player on loan at the club. Players and their allocated positions from the Munster Rugby website.

=== Academy squad ===
Munster Rugby academy squad
**Props**: (Ireland) Mark Donnelly **(2)**; (Ireland) Darragh McSweeney **(1)**; (Ireland) Kieran Ryan **(1)**; **Hookers**: None at present; **Locks**: (Ireland) Edwin Edogbo **(2)**; (Ireland) Cian Hurley **(3)**; (Ireland) Evan O'Connell **(1)**	**Back row**: (Ireland) Daniel Okeke **(2)**; (Ireland) Ruadhán Quinn **(1)**; **Scrum-halves**: (Ireland) Ethan Coughlan **(2)**; (Ireland) Jack Oliver **(1)**; **Fly-halves**: (Ireland) Tony Butler **(2)**	**Centres**: (Ireland) Fionn Gibbons **(1)**; **Back three**: (Ireland) Patrick Campbell **(2)**; (Ireland) Conor Phillips **(3)**
(c) denotes the team captain, **Bold** denotes internationally capped players, number in brackets indicates players stage in the three-year academy cycle.^{*} denotes players qualified to play for Ireland on residency or dual nationality. Players and their allocated positions from the Munster Rugby website.

== Pre-season and friendlies ==
26 August 2022
19:30

Munster (Ireland)	19–28	(England) Gloucester
	Report

Musgrave Park
Attendance: 5,376
Referee: Peter Martin (IRFU)

2 September 2022
19:30

Munster (Ireland)	14–19	(England) London Irish
	Report

Musgrave Park
Attendance: 5,316
Referee: Chris Busby (IRFU)

10 November 2022
19:30

Munster (Ireland)	28–14	South Africa XV
Try: S. Daly 2' c Zebo 28' c Barron 38' c Haley 42' c Con: Healy (4/4) 4', 30', 39', 43'	Report	Try: Fassi 12' c Notshe 62' c Con: Goosen (1/1) 14'; Lombard (1/1) 62'

Páirc Uí Chaoimh
Attendance: 41,400
Referee: Karl Dickson (RFU)

Team details

FB	15	(Ireland) Mike Haley
RW	14	(Ireland) Shane Daly
OC	13	(Ireland) Antoine Frisch	(substituted off) 63'
IC	12	(Ireland) Rory Scannell
LW	11	(Ireland) Simon Zebo	(substituted off) 53'
FH	10	(Ireland) Ben Healy
SH	9	(Ireland) Paddy Patterson	(substituted off) 72'
N8	8	(Ireland) Gavin Coombes	(substituted off) 57'
OF	7	(Ireland) John Hodnett			(substituted off) 61'	(substituted on) 71'
BF	6	(Ireland) Jack O'Donoghue (c)
RL	5	(Scotland) Kiran McDonald
LL	4	(Ireland) Edwin Edogbo	(substituted off) 63'
TP	3	(Ireland) Roman Salanoa	(substituted off) 55'
HK	2	(Ireland) Diarmuid Barron	(substituted off) 55'
LP	1	(Ireland) Josh Wycherley	(substituted off) 55'		(substituted on) 61'	(substituted off) 71'
Replacements:
HK	16	(Ireland) Niall Scannell	(substituted on) 55'
PR	17	(Ireland) Liam O'Connor	(substituted on) 55'	(yellow card) 61' to 71'
PR	18	(South Africa) Keynan Knox	(substituted on) 55'
LK	19	(Ireland) Cian Hurley	(substituted on) 63'
BR	20	(Ireland) Alex Kendellen	(substituted on) 57'
SH	21	(Ireland) Neil Cronin	(substituted on) 72'
B3	22	(Ireland) Patrick Campbell	(substituted on) 53'
CE	23	(Tonga) Malakai Fekitoa	(substituted on) 63'
Coach:
(England) Graham Rowntree

FB	15	Aphelele Fassi	(substituted off) 73'
RW	14	Suleiman Hartzenberg
OC	13	Henco van Wyk
IC	12	Cornal Hendricks
LW	11	Leolin Zas
FH	10	Johan Goosen	(substituted off) 61'
SH	9	Herschel Jantjies	(substituted off) 44'
N8	8	Jean-Luc du Preez
OF	7	Elrigh Louw
BF	6	Phepsi Buthelezi	(substituted off) 56'
RL	5	Ruan Nortjé	(substituted off) 44'
LL	4	Jason Jenkins
TP	3	Thomas du Toit (c)	(substituted off) 50'
HK	2	Joseph Dweba	(substituted off) 56'
LP	1	Ntuthuko Mchunu	(substituted off) 50'
Replacements:
HK	16	Andre-Hugo Venter	(substituted on) 56'
PR	17	Simphiwe Matanzima	(substituted on) 50'
PR	18	Sazi Sandi	(substituted on) 50'
LK	19	Dan du Preez	(substituted on) 44'
BR	20	Sikhumbuzo Notshe	(substituted on) 56'
SH	21	Grant Williams	(substituted on) 44'
B3	22	Sanele Nohamba	(substituted on) 73'
B3	23	Gianni Lombard	(substituted on) 61'
Coach:
(South Africa) Mzwandile Stick

Man of the Match:
Paddy Patterson (Munster)

Touch judges:
Sam Grove-White (SRU)
Ben Blain (SRU)
Television match official:
Rowan Kitt (RFU)

== 2022–23 United Rugby Championship ==
2022–23 United Rugby Championship
	Team	P	W	D	L	PF	PA	PD	TF	TA	Try bonus	Losing bonus	Pts
1	(Ireland) Leinster	18	16	1	1	580	363	+217	82	42	13	0	79
2	(Ireland) Ulster	18	13	0	5	554	378	+176	79	45	12	4	68
3	(South Africa) Stormers (RU)	18	12	2	4	531	391	+140	69	48	13	3	68
4	(Scotland) Glasgow Warriors	18	13	0	5	498	403	+95	72	53	11	0	63
5	(Ireland) Munster (CH)	18	10	1	7	470	357	+113	61	43	9	4	55
6	(South Africa) Bulls	18	10	0	8	613	448	+165	78	52	11	2	53
7	(Ireland) Connacht	18	10	0	8	456	426	+30	64	58	7	3	50
8	(South Africa) Sharks	18	9	1	8	486	480	+6	63	61	8	2	48
9	(South Africa) Lions	18	9	0	9	454	538	–84	55	75	7	2	45
10	(Wales) Cardiff	18	9	0	9	425	470	–45	52	64	6	2	44
11	(Italy) Benetton	18	8	0	10	440	533	–93	56	74	8	1	41
12	(Scotland) Edinburgh	18	6	0	12	466	467	–1	70	62	8	6	38
13	(Wales) Ospreys	18	5	2	11	400	514	–114	52	70	6	5	35
14	(Wales) Scarlets	18	6	1	11	435	506	–71	55	65	5	3	34
15	(Wales) Dragons	18	4	0	14	391	534	–143	46	70	5	3	24
16	(Italy) Zebre Parma	18	0	0	18	343	734	–391	50	105	6	5	11
If teams are level at any stage, tiebreakers are applied in the following order: 1. number of matches won; 2. the difference between points for and points against; 3. the number of tries scored; 4. the most points scored; 5. the difference between tries for and tries against; 6. the fewest red cards received; 7. the fewest yellow cards received.
Green background indicates teams that are playoff places that top their regional pools and earn a place in the 2023–24 European Champions Cup Blue background indicates teams that did not top their regional pool but are in play-off places and earn a place in the 2023–24 European Champions Cup; Pink background indicates teams that did not top their regional pool but are in play-off places, and earn a place in the 2023–24 European Challenge Cup; Yellow background indicates teams that top their regional pool and thus currently in a qualification place in the 2023–24 European Champions Cup, but are not in a play-off place Plain background indicates teams that earn a place in the 2023–24 European Challenge Cup. Q: qualified for play-offs. H: home field advantage secured for quarter-and semi-final. h; home field advantage secured for quarter-final X: cannot reach play-offs. E: qualified for Champions Cup.

2022–23 United Rugby Championship Regional Shield Pools
(Ireland) Irish Shield
	Team	P	W	D	L	PF	PA	PD	TF	TA	TBP	LBP	Pts
1	(Ireland) Leinster (S)	18	16	1	1	580	363	+217	84	50	13	0	79
2	(Ireland) Ulster	18	13	0	5	554	378	+176	79	45	12	4	68
3	(Ireland) Munster	18	10	1	7	470	357	+113	61	43	9	4	55
4	(Ireland) Connacht	18	10	0	8	456	426	+30	64	58	7	3	50
(Italy) (Scotland) Scottish/Italian Shield
	Team	P	W	D	L	PF	PA	PD	TF	TA	TBP	LBP	Pts
1	(Scotland) Glasgow Warriors (S)	18	12	0	6	498	403	+95	72	53	11	0	63
2	(Italy) Benetton	18	8	0	10	440	533	–93	56	74	8	1	41
3	(Scotland) Edinburgh	18	6	0	12	466	467	-1	70	62	8	6	38
4	(Italy) Zebre Parma	18	0	0	18	343	734	–391	50	105	6	5	11
(South Africa) South African Shield
	Team	P	W	D	L	PF	PA	PD	TF	TA	TBP	LBP	Pts
1	(South Africa) Stormers (S)	18	12	2	4	531	391	+140	69	48	13	3	68
2	(South Africa) Bulls	18	10	0	8	613	448	+165	78	52	11	2	53
3	(South Africa) Sharks	18	9	1	8	486	480	+6	63	61	8	2	48
4	(South Africa) Lions	18	9	0	9	454	538	–84	55	75	7	2	45
(Wales) Welsh Shield
	Team	P	W	D	L	PF	PA	PD	TF	TA	TBP	LBP	Pts
1	(Wales) Cardiff (S)	18	9	0	9	425	470	–45	52	64	6	2	44
2	(Wales) Ospreys	18	5	2	11	400	514	–114	52	70	6	5	35
3	(Wales) Scarlets	18	6	1	11	435	506	–71	55	65	5	3	34
4	(Wales) Dragons	18	4	0	14	391	534	–143	46	70	5	3	24
If teams are level at any stage, tiebreakers are applied in the following order: 1. number of matches won 2. the difference between points for and points against 3. the number of tries scored 4. the most points scored 5. the difference between tries for and tries against 6. the fewest red cards received 7. the fewest yellow cards received
Green background indicates teams currently leading the Regional Shield, and leading the race for a place in the 2023–24 European Champions Cup (S) indicates teams has won the Regional Shield, and thus guaranteed a place in the 2023–24 European Champions Cup

=== Round 1 ===
17 September 2022
15:05

Cardiff (Wales)	20–13	(Ireland) Munster (1 BP)
Try: Llewellyn 3' m Dacey 37' c Summerhill 77' m Con: J. Evans (1/3) 38'; Pen: J. Evans (1/1) 68'	Report	Try: O'Sullivan 62' c Con: Crowley (1/1) 63'; Pen: Healy (2/2) 17', 30'

Cardiff Arms Park
Attendance: 6,434
Referee: Mike Adamson (SRU)

=== Round 2 ===
25 September 2022
15:00

Dragons (Wales)	23–17	(Ireland) Munster (1 BP)
Try: Dyer 71' m Pen: Hanrahan (6/7) 9', 15', 22', 26', 34', 80'	Report	Try: Archer 36' c Healy 39' c Con: Healy (2/2) 36', 40'; Pen: Healy (1/1) 2'

Rodney Parade
Attendance: 4,269
Referee: Sam Grove-White (SRU)

=== Round 3 ===
1 October 2022
17:05

Munster (Ireland)	21–5	(Italy) Zebre Parma
Try: N. Scannell (2) 8' c, 24' c Knox 17' c Con: Healy (3/3) 8', 18', 25'	Report	Try: Pani 44' m

Musgrave Park
Attendance: 6,485
Referee: AJ Jacobs (SARU)

=== Round 4 ===
7 October 2022
19:35

Connacht (Ireland)	20–11	(Ireland) Munster
Try: Hansen 7' m Bealham 53' m Boyle 78' c Con: Fitzgerald (1/1) 79'; Pen: Fitzgerald (1/1) 61'	Report	Try: Campbell 23' m Pen: Healy (2/2) 39', 47'

The Sportsground
Attendance: 7,512
Referee: Chris Busby (IRFU)

=== Round 5 ===
15 October 2022
19:35

(1 BP) Munster (Ireland)	31–17	(South Africa) Bulls
Try: G. Coombes (2) 28' c, 35' c Loughman 42' c Beirne 61' c Con: Carbery (4/4) 29', 36', 43', 62'; Pen: Carbery (1/1) 21'	Report	Try: WJ Steenkamp 50' c Kriel 64' c Con: C. Smith (2/2) 51', 65'; Pen: Goosen (1/1) 10'

Thomond Park
Attendance: 12,218
Referee: Mike Adamson (SRU)

=== Round 6 ===
22 October 2022
17:15

(1 BP) Leinster (Ireland)	27–13	(Ireland) Munster
Try: Penny 27' c Sheehan 49' c McGrath 61' m Russell 76' m Con: Sexton (2/3) 28', 50'; Pen: Sexton (1/2) 57'	Report	Try: L. Coombes 45' c Con: Carbery (1/1) 46'; Pen: Carbery (2/3) 21', 33'

Aviva Stadium
Attendance: 45,436
Referee: Andrew Brace (IRFU)

=== Round 7 ===
29 October 2022
17:15

(1 BP) Munster (Ireland)	14–15	(Ireland) Ulster
Try: S. Daly 65' m Pen: Crowley (3/3) 9', 47', 53'	Report	Try: Murphy 3' m Stewart 13' m Hume 40' m

Thomond Park
Attendance: 15,260
Referee: Frank Murphy (IRFU)

=== Round 8 ===
26 November 2022
19:35

(1 BP) Munster (Ireland)	24–17	(Ireland) Connacht (1 BP)
Try: Nash 11' m Salanoa 36' m J. Ryan 58' c N. Scannell 65' c Con: Carbery (2/4) 59', 66'	Report	Try: Ralston 26' c Marmion 73' c Con: Carty (2/2) 27', 73'; Pen: Carty (1/1) 9'

Thomond Park
Attendance: 16,725
Referee: Gianluca Gnecchi (FIR)

=== Round 9 ===
2 December 2022
19:35

Edinburgh (Scotland)	17–38	(Ireland) Munster (1 BP)
Try: Dean 2' c Graham 13' m Ritchie 35' m Con: Kinghorn (1/3) 3'	Report	Try: Casey 23' c R. Scannell 39' c Nash 41' c G. Coombes 52' c Carbery 79' c Con: Carbery (5/5) 24', 40', 42', 53', 80'; Pen: Carbery (1/1) 64'

DAM Health Stadium
Attendance: 7,339
Referee: Mathieu Raynal (FFR)

=== Round 10 ===
26 December 2022
19:35

(1 BP) Munster (Ireland)	19–20	(Ireland) Leinster
Try: G. Coombes 30' c Penalty try 43'; Campbell 63' m Con: Carbery (1/2) 30'	Report	Try: Penny 44' c Sheehan 53' c Con: R. Byrne (2/2) 44', 54'; Pen: R. Byrne (2/3) 2', 19'

Thomond Park
Attendance: 25,600
Referee: Chris Busby (IRFU)

=== Round 11 ===
1 January 2023
17:15

(1 BP) Ulster (Ireland)	14–15	(Ireland) Munster
Try: Baloucoune 67' m Pen: Cooney (3/3) 15', 19', 24'	Report	Try: Patterson 43' m Healy 79' c Con: Healy (1/1) 80'; Pen: Healy (1/1) 73'

Kingspan Stadium
Attendance: 16,672
Referee: Andrew Brace (IRFU)

=== Round 12 ===
6 January 2023
19:35

(1 BP) Munster (Ireland)	33–3	(South Africa) Lions
Try: Buckley (2) 9' m, 79' c O'Donoghue 28' c Patterson 48' c L. Coombes 74' c Con: Healy (4/5) 30', 49', 76', 80'+1	Report	Pen: Hendrikse (1/1) 5'

Musgrave Park
Attendance: 8,008
Referee: Hollie Davidson (SRU)

=== Round 13 ===
28 January 2023
14:30

(1 BP) Benetton (Italy)	30–40	(Ireland) Munster (1 BP)
Try: Zanon 6' m Mendy (3) 12' c, 57' m, 80'+1 c Con: Umaga (2/4) 13', 80'+2; Pen: Umaga (2/2) 39', 46'	Report	Try: Patterson 16' c O'Sullivan 30' c Hodnett 42' c Kleyn 49' c Frisch 71' m Carbery 76' c Con: Carbery (5/6) 17', 31', 43', 51', 77'

Stadio Monigo
Attendance: 4,082
Referee: Ben Blain (SRU)

=== Round 14 ===
17 February 2023
19:35

(1 BP) Munster (Ireland)	58–3	(Wales) Ospreys
Try: G. Coombes (3), 14' c, 52' c, 79' c Feikitoa 18' m Frisch 29' m Carbery 36' c Patterson 41' m Zebo 62' m S. Daly 67' c Con: Carbery (5/9) 15', 37', 53', 68', 79'; Pen: Carbery (1/1) 12'	Report	Pen: Myler (1/1) 3'

Thomond Park
Attendance: 14,082
Referee: Gianluca Gnecchi (FIR)

=== Round 15 ===
3 March 2023
19:35

(1 BP) Munster (Ireland)	49–42	(Wales) Scarlets (2 BP)
Try: Campbell 2' c Nash (2) 12' c, 64' c S. Daly (2) 23' c, 40'+1 c Patterson 26' c G. Coombes 49' c Con: Carbery (6/6) 3', 12', 24', 27', 40'+1, 49'; Crowley (1/1) 65'	Report	Try: Roberts 34' c Fifita 45' c Kalamafoni 53' c Lousi 60' c G. Davies 70' c Rogers 76' c Con: Costelow (6/6) 35', 46', 54', 60', 71', 77'

Musgrave Park
Attendance: 8,008
Referee: Ben Blain (SRU)

=== Round 16 ===
25 March 2023
17:15

(1 BP) Munster (Ireland)	26–38	(Scotland) Glasgow Warriors (1 BP)
Try: G. Coombes 53' c Casey 57' c J. Wycherley 70' c Nash 77' m Con: Carbery (2/2) 53', 57'; Crowley (1/2) 70'	Report	Try: F. Brown 5' c McDowall 24' c Miotti 31' c Forbes 39' c Vailanu 60' c Con: Miotti (5/5) 6', 25', 32', 40', 62'; Drop: Miotti (1/1) 44'

Thomond Park
Attendance: 17,097
Referee: Andrea Piardi (FIR)

=== Round 17 ===
15 April 2023
17:15

(2 BP) Stormers (South Africa)	24–26	(Ireland) Munster (1 BP)
Try: Malherbe 29' m Nel (2) 40'+3, 80'+1; Kitshoff 65' c Con: Libbok (2/4) 40'+3, 80'+1	Report	Try: Barron (2) 1' c, 21' m S. Daly 57' c G. Coombes 73' c Con: Crowley (1/2) 2'; Healy (2/2) 58', 74'

DHL Stadium
Attendance: 15,000
Referee: Craig Evans (WRU)

=== Round 18 ===
22 April 2023
17:15

Sharks (South Africa)	22–22	(Ireland) Munster
Try: Mbonambi 5' m Kok 28' c Notshe 38' c Con: Bosch (1/2) 30'; Chamberlain (1/1) 39'; Pen: Chamberlain (1/1) 43'	Report	Try: Penalty try 47'; Nash 53' m Murray 64' c Con: Healy (1/2) 65'; Pen: Crowley (1/1) 15'

Hollywoodbets Kings Park
Attendance: 4,000
Referee: Mike Adamson (SRU)

=== Quarter-final ===
6 May 2023
19:35

Glasgow Warriors (Scotland)	5–14	(Ireland) Munster
Try: Steyn 66' m	Report	Try: Fekitoa 22' c Frisch 27' c Con: Crowley (2/2) 23', 28'

Scotstoun Stadium
Attendance: 6,943
Referee: Andrea Piardi (FIR)

=== Semi-final ===
13 May 2023
17:30

Leinster (Ireland)	15–16	(Ireland) Munster
Try: Jenkins 37' c J. McCarthy 62' m Con: H. Byrne (1/1) 39'; Pen: H. Byrne (1/1) 1'	Report	Try: Beirne 45' c Con: Crowley (1/1) 46'; Pen: Healy (2/2) 10', 23'; Drop: Crowley (1/1) 77'

Aviva Stadium
Attendance: 26,795
Referee: Frank Murphy (IRFU)

=== Final ===
27 May 2023
17:30

Stormers (South Africa)	14–19	(Ireland) Munster
Try: Libbok 5' c Fourie 49' c Con: Libbok (2/2) 6', 50'	Report	Try: Barron 9' m Nash 28' c Hodnett 74' c Con: Crowley (2/3) 30', 76'

DHL Stadium
Attendance: 56,100
Referee: Andrea Piardi (FIR)

== 2022–23 European Rugby Champions Cup ==
Following their sixth-placed finish in the 2021–22 United Rugby Championship, Munster were seeded in tier three for the 2022–23 European Rugby Champions Cup. The province was drawn in pool B and will face French club Toulouse and English club Northampton Saints.

2022–23 European Rugby Champions Cup Pool B
Team	P	W	D	L	PF	PA	Diff	TF	TA	TB	LB	Pts
(France) La Rochelle	4	4	0	0	120	57	+63	15	7	2	0	18
(France) Toulouse	4	4	0	0	110	53	+57	12	7	1	0	17
(South Africa) Stormers	4	3	0	1	106	68	+38	13	7	3	0	15
(England) Leicester Tigers	4	3	0	1	116	89	+27	11	10	1	1	14
(Wales) Ospreys	4	3	0	1	100	88	+12	12	10	1	1	14
(Ireland) Munster	4	2	0	2	73	67	+6	8	5	0	2	10
(France) Montpellier	4	1	1	2	92	104	–12	13	13	2	1	9
(Ireland) Ulster	4	1	0	3	54	93	–39	7	11	1	2	7
(France) Clermont	4	1	0	3	85	111	–26	8	12	1	1	6
(England) Sale Sharks	4	1	0	3	74	94	–20	11	12	1	0	5
(England) London Irish	4	0	1	3	76	115	–39	10	15	0	1	3
(England) Northampton Saints	4	0	0	4	54	121	–67	5	16	0	1	1
Green background (rows 1 to 8) indicates qualification places for the Champions Cup round of 16. Blue background (rows 9 to 10) indicates qualification places for the Challenge Cup round of 16. Starting table — source: European Professional Club Rugby

=== Round 1 ===
11 December 2022
15:15

(1 BP) Munster (Ireland)	13–18	(France) Toulouse
Try: Carbery 9' c Con: Carbery (1/1) 10'; Pen: Carbery (2/3) 38', 74'	Report	Try: Lebel 22' c Tauzin 42' m Con: Ramos (1/2) 23'; Pen: Ramos (2/3) 29', 71'

Thomond Park
Attendance: 21,884
Referee: Christophe Ridley (RFU)

=== Round 2 ===
18 December 2022
13:00

Northampton Saints (England)	6–17	(Ireland) Munster
Pen: F. Smith (2/2) 19', 28'	Report	Try: G. Coombes (2) 13' c, 35' c Con: Carbery (2/2) 14', 36'; Pen: Carbery (1/1) 26'

cinch Stadium at Franklin's Gardens
Attendance: 13,220
Referee: Pierre-Baptiste Nuchy (FFR)

=== Round 3 ===
14 January 2023
15:15

Munster (Ireland)	27–23	(England) Northampton Saints (1 BP)
Try: G. Coombes (2) 8' c, 28' c O'Donoghue 19' c Con: Carbery (3/3) 9', 20', 29'; Pen: Carbery (1/1) 1'; Crowley (1/1) 75'	Report	Try: Freeman 44' c Ramm 55' c Con: F. Smith (2/2) 46', 56'; Pen: F. Smith (3/3) 49', 70', 78'

Thomond Park
Attendance: 22,295
Referee: Tual Trainini (FFR)

=== Round 4 ===
22 January 2023
15:15

Toulouse (France)	20–16	(Ireland) Munster (1 BP)
Try: Mallía 7' m Pen: Jaminet (5/5) 1', 16', 57', 66', 73'	Report	Try: Hodnett 30' m Beirne 48' m Pen: Carbery (1/1) 35'; Healy (1/1) 59'

Stade Ernest-Wallon
Attendance: 18,754
Referee: Karl Dickson (RFU)

=== Last 16 ===
1 April 2023
12:30

Sharks (South Africa)	50–35	(Ireland) Munster
Try: Hendrikse 15' c Etzebeth 24' c Mbonambi (2) 44' c, 48' m Kok 53' c Bosch 57' c Mapimpi 63' c Con: Bosch (6/7) 17', 24', 45', 54', 58', 64'; Pen: Bosch (1/2) 4'	Report	Try: S. Daly 5' c Kilcoyne 31' c Barron 60' c Haley 68' c F. Wycherley 77' c Con: Crowley (5/5) 6', 33', 61', 69', 78'

Hollywoodbets Kings Park
Attendance: 27,987
Referee: Wayne Barnes (RFU)

== Player statistics ==
Player statistics from the 2022–23 season. Stats from the league and European competitions only are shown, 26 matches total. Academy players in italics. Updated 28 May 2023 after URC final

Pos	Player	Apps	Starts	Sub	Mins	Tries	Cons	Pens	Drops	Points	Yel	Red
PR	Stephen Archer	15	7	8	683	1	0	0	0	5	0	0
PR	Mark Donnelly	3	0	3	54	0	0	0	0	0	0	0
PR	James French	0	0	0	0	0	0	0	0	0	0	0
PR	Dave Kilcoyne	15	10	5	704	1	0	0	0	5	0	0
PR	Keynan Knox	8	4	4	280	1	0	0	0	5	1	0
PR	Jeremy Loughman	13	10	3	716	1	0	0	0	5	0	0
PR	Darragh McSweeney	0	0	0	0	0	0	0	0	0	0	0
PR	Liam O'Connor	2	0	2	37	0	0	0	0	0	1	0
PR	John Ryan	8	6	2	444	1	0	0	0	5	0	0
PR	Kieran Ryan	0	0	0	0	0	0	0	0	0	0	0
PR	Roman Salanoa	21	10	11	725	1	0	0	0	5	0	0
PR	Josh Wycherley	21	7	14	680	1	0	0	0	5	0	0
HK	Diarmuid Barron	22	12	10	901	5	0	0	0	25	1	0
HK	Scott Buckley	9	0	9	198	2	0	0	0	10	0	0
HK	Chris Moore	0	0	0	0	0	0	0	0	0	0	0
HK	Niall Scannell	22	15	7	1,075	3	0	0	0	15	0	0
LK	Thomas Ahern	3	1	2	120	0	0	0	0	0	0	0
LK	Tadhg Beirne	14	13	1	1,088	3	0	0	0	15	0	0
LK	Edwin Edogbo	8	3	5	298	0	0	0	0	0	0	0
LK	Cian Hurley	4	0	4	96	0	0	0	0	0	0	0
LK	Paddy Kelly	0	0	0	0	0	0	0	0	0	0	0
LK	Jean Kleyn	24	24	0	1,505	1	0	0	0	5	1	0
LK	Kiran McDonald	3	2	1	169	0	0	0	0	0	0	0
LK	Evan O'Connell	0	0	0	0	0	0	0	0	0	0	0
LK	Eoin O'Connor	1	1	0	50	0	0	0	0	0	0	0
LK	RG Snyman	6	3	3	214	0	0	0	0	0	0	0
LK	Fineen Wycherley	12	8	4	741	1	0	0	0	5	0	0
BR	Gavin Coombes	22	21	1	1,634	14	0	0	0	70	0	0
BR	Jack Daly	0	0	0	0	0	0	0	0	0	0	0
BR	John Hodnett	20	15	5	1,279	3	0	0	0	15	0	0
BR	Alex Kendellen	22	8	14	756	0	0	0	0	0	0	0
BR	Jack O'Donoghue	23	15	8	1,226	2	0	0	0	10	2	1
BR	Daniel Okeke	0	0	0	0	0	0	0	0	0	0	0
BR	Peter O'Mahony	17	17	0	1,049	0	0	0	0	0	1	0
BR	Jack O'Sullivan	9	4	5	423	2	0	0	0	10	0	0
BR	Ruadhán Quinn	3	0	3	25	0	0	0	0	0	0	0
SH	Craig Casey	18	10	8	794	2	0	0	0	10	1	0
SH	Ethan Coughlan	2	0	2	55	0	0	0	0	0	0	0
SH	Neil Cronin	3	0	3	29	0	0	0	0	0	0	0
SH	Conor Murray	14	8	6	613	1	0	0	0	5	0	0
SH	Jack Oliver	0	0	0	0	0	0	0	0	0	0	0
SH	Paddy Patterson	14	9	5	684	5	0	0	0	25	0	0
FH	Tony Butler	0	0	0	0	0	0	0	0	0	0	0
FH	Joey Carbery	17	14	3	1,033	4	37	10	0	124	1	0
FH	Jack Crowley	20	14	6	1,223	0	14	5	1	46	1	0
FH	Ben Healy	16	7	9	665	2	17	9	0	71	2	0
CE	Chris Farrell	1	1	0	59	0	0	0	0	0	0	0
CE	Malakai Fekitoa	19	17	2	1,366	2	0	0	0	10	1	0
CE	Antoine Frisch	19	18	1	1,402	3	0	0	0	15	0	0
CE	Fionn Gibbons	1	0	1	13	0	0	0	0	0	0	0
CE	Dan Goggin	6	5	1	393	0	0	0	0	0	0	0
CE	Oli Morris	0	0	0	0	0	0	0	0	0	0	0
CE	Rory Scannell	16	7	9	682	1	0	0	0	5	0	0
B3	Patrick Campbell	10	4	6	427	3	0	0	0	15	0	0
B3	Andrew Conway	0	0	0	0	0	0	0	0	0	0	0
B3	Liam Coombes	7	6	1	483	2	0	0	0	10	0	0
B3	Shane Daly	24	23	1	1,800	7	0	0	0	35	2	0
B3	Keith Earls	9	5	4	345	0	0	0	0	0	0	0
B3	Mike Haley	18	18	0	1,260	2	0	0	0	10	1	0
B3	Calvin Nash	17	17	0	1,235	7	0	0	0	35	0	0
B3	Conor Phillips	2	2	0	160	0	0	0	0	0	0	0
B3	Simon Zebo	6	4	2	292	2	0	0	0	10	0	0
