= Autism Assistance Dogs Ireland =

Irish national disability charity

Autism Assistance Dogs Ireland (AADI) is a non-profit organisation that trains assistance dogs for children with autism.

It was founded in 2010 by Ms. Nuala Geraghty.

According to the Irish Examiner, the charity commences training of the dogs when they are puppies, which are then sent to a foster family for further practice, and are later matched with a family which has an autistic child.

It receives no State funding. In 2015, AADI lobbied for recognition of autism assistance dogs in Irish law. In 2024, it initiated the ‘Fáilte Programme,’ which provided enterprises with a complimentary online training programme. They would receive a Fáilte Badge as a symbol of their dedication to the distinct requirements of families with autism upon completion of the course. Numerous industry and sectoral organisations provided support to the program.

According to its website, Ireland and Munster Rugby players Cian Hurley, Calvin Nash and Jack Daly became brand ambassadors for the charity in 2024.
