= Ben Healy (rugby union) =

Scottish rugby union player (born 1999)

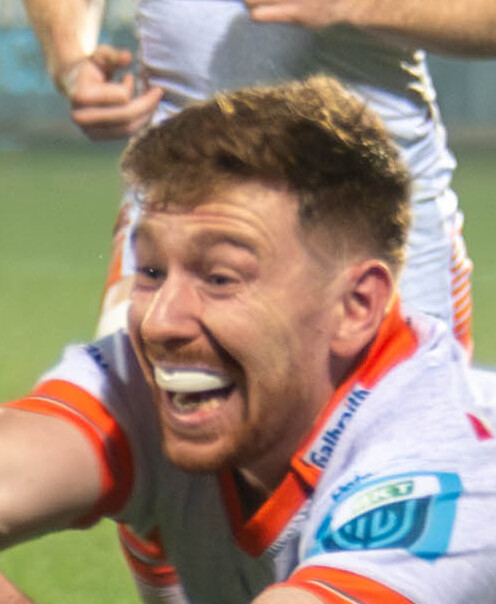
- Born: 29 June 1999 (age 27) Tipperary, Ireland
- Height: 1.91 m (6 ft 3 in)
- Weight: 97 kg (214 lb; 15 st 4 lb)
- School: Glenstal Abbey School

Rugby union career
- Position: Fly-half
- Current team: Edinburgh
Senior career
Years	Team	Apps	(Points)
2018–2023	Garryowen		
2019–2023	Munster	56	(298)
2023–2026	Edinburgh	36	(268)
2026	→ Newcastle	4	(7)
- Correct as of 14 February 2025
International career
Years	Team	Apps	(Points)
2019	Ireland U20	8	(63)
2023–2026	Scotland	10	(59)
- Correct as of 27 July 2024

Ben Healy (born 29 June 1999) is a professional rugby union player who plays as a fly-half in the top 14 for La Rochelle. Born in Ireland, he represents Scotland at international level after qualifying on ancestry grounds.

== Early life ==
Healy first began playing rugby for Nenagh Ormond in County Tipperary, and went on to captain Glenstal Abbey to their first Munster Schools Rugby Senior Cup in 2018, defeating Christian Brothers College 18–17 in the final. He also won representation for Munster at under-18, under-19 and under-20 level, as well as Ireland at under-18 and under-19 level.

== Club career ==
=== Garryowen ===
Healy started and scored 13 points for Garryowen as they beat City of Armagh 45–21 in the final of the 2018–19 All-Ireland Cup in April 2019.

=== Munster ===
Munster moved to bring Healy into their academy immediately after he had completed his leaving cert, with Healy joining ahead of the 2018–19 season. He made five appearances for Munster A during the 2018–19 Celtic Cup, scoring 19 points.

Healy made his senior competitive debut for Munster in their 2019–20 Pro14 round 7 fixture against Edinburgh on 29 November 2019, starting at fly-half and scoring 11 points in the provinces 18–16 defeat. He made his European debut for Munster in their final pool 4 fixture of the 2019–20 Champions Cup against Welsh side Ospreys on 19 January 2020. Healy came off the bench to replace starting fly-half JJ Hanrahan in Munster's opening 2020–21 Pro14 fixture away to Welsh side Scarlets on 3 October 2020, scoring ten points of the kicking tee, including the conversion of Kevin O'Byrne's 77th minute try to level the scores with just minutes remaining of the game, before scoring a 50-metre penalty in the 81st minute to earn a 30–27 win for Munster.

One week later, Healy started for Munster in their match against Edinburgh, scoring six of his seven penalties and converting CJ Stander's 76th minute try to earn a 25–23 win for the province. He joined the Munster senior squad on a one-year contract for the 2021–22 season. Healy scored his first try for Munster in their 31–17 win against Italian side Benetton in round 16 of the 2020–21 Pro14 on 19 March 2021. For his performances throughout the 2020–21 season, Healy was awarded the John McCarthy Award for Academy Player of the Year.

Healy signed a one-year contract extension in January 2022. He started in Munster's historic 28–14 win against a South Africa XV in Páirc Uí Chaoimh on 10 November 2022, scoring all four of his attempted conversions for eight points and a 100% kicking record during the match. Healy scored a 79th minute try and converted it to earn a 15–14 away win against Ulster in round 11 of the 2022–23 United Rugby Championship on 1 January 2023, a result that had seemed unlikely for much of the game.

Healy earned his 50th cap for Munster in their 40–30 away win against Italian side Benetton in round 13 of the 2022–23 United Rugby Championship on 28 January 2023, and came on as a replacement in Munster's 19–14 win against the Stormers in the final of the 2022–23 United Rugby Championship on 27 May 2023.

=== Edinburgh ===
Healy, who is Scottish-qualified, joined Edinburgh on a two-year contract from the 2023–24 season.

== International career ==
=== Ireland ===
Selected in the Ireland under-20s squad for the 2019 Six Nations Under 20s Championship, Healy made his debut for the side when he came on as a replacement in their 34–24 win against Italy on 22 February 2019, before going on to start at fly-half in the wins against France and Wales, the latter of which secured Ireland's first grand slam in the tournament since 2007. He was retained in the under-20s squad for the 2019 World Rugby Under 20 Championship when it was confirmed in May 2019.

=== Scotland ===
Healy is Scottish-qualified through his maternal grandparents, and in 2020 the Scottish Rugby Union attempted to persuade him to join Glasgow Warriors. Though Healy rejected that offer and signed a one-year contract extension with Munster, Scotland head coach Gregor Townsend retained interest in him, and Healy would subsequently agree to join Edinburgh on a two-year contract from the 2023–24 season. He was selected in the Scotland squad for the 2023 Six Nations Championship following the announcement of his transfer to Edinburgh and an injury to fly-half Adam Hastings, and made his international debut for Scotland in their final fixture of the tournament against Italy on 18 March, featuring as a replacement during the second half of their 26–14 home win.

Healy made his first start for Scotland in their 2023 Rugby World Cup warm-up match against Italy on 29 July, scoring two conversions and two penalties in Scotland's 25–13 win, for which Healy earned the player of the match award, and he was subsequently selected in the final 33-man squad for the 2023 Rugby World Cup.

== Career statistics ==
=== International analysis by opposition ===
Against	Played	Won	Lost	Drawn	Tries	Cons	Pens	Drops	Points	% Won
Georgia	1	1	0	0	0	2	0	0	4	100
Italy	2	2	0	0	0	2	2	0	10	100
Romania	1	1	0	0	1	11	0	0	27	100
England	1	1	0	0	0	0	0	0	0	100
Total	5	5	0	0	1	15	2	0	41	100

Correct as of 30 September 2023.

== Honours ==
Glenstal Abbey School

- 1× Munster Schools Rugby Senior Cup: 2018

Garryowen

- 1× All-Ireland Cup: 2019

Munster

- 1× United Rugby Championship: 2023

Ireland U20

- 1× Six Nations Under 20s Championship: 2019
- 1× Grand Slam: 2019
- 1× Triple Crown: 2019

Individual

- 1× Munster Rugby Academy Player of the Year: 2021
