= Aled Summerhill =

Welsh rugby union footballer

- Born: Aled Rhys Llywelyn Summerhill; 22 November 1994 (age 31) Rhondda Cynon Taf, Wales
- Height: 188 cm (6 ft 2 in)
- Weight: 91 kg (14 st 5 lb)

Rugby union career
- Position(s): Wing; Fullback
- Current team: Cardiff Rugby
Senior career
Years	Team	Apps	(Points)
2014 -	Cardiff Rugby	95	(160)
- Correct as of 24 March 2024
International career
Years	Team	Apps	(Points)
- Wales U18

Aled Summerhill (born 22 November 1994) is a Rhondda born, Welsh rugby union player who plays for the Cardiff Rugby as a centre, winger, or as a fullback. He was a Wales under-18 international. Summerhill made his debut for Cardiff in 2014 having previously played for the Cardiff academy.

Summerhill made his debut for Cardiff in 2014 having previously played for the academy. He broke into the team during the 2015 Rugby World Cup period scoring 3 tries in his first 3 games of the season. His performances earned him a callup to train with the Wales national team, although this turned out to be a breach in protocol, for which Wales were warned.
