= Alex McHenry =

Irish rugby union player (born 1997)

- Born: 7 October 1997 (age 29) Cork, Ireland
- Height: 1.88 m (6 ft 2 in)
- Weight: 95 kg (15.0 st; 209 lb)
- School: Christian Brothers College
- University: University College Cork

Rugby union career
- Position: Centre
Amateur team(s)
Years	Team	Apps	(Points)
2016–2022	Cork Constitution		
Senior career
Years	Team	Apps	(Points)
2019–2022	Munster	3	(5)
2021	→ Wasps (loan)	4	(0)
2022–	Jersey Reds	19	(30)
- Correct as of 29 April 2023
International career
Years	Team	Apps	(Points)
2017	Ireland U20	1	(0)
- Correct as of 24 February 2017
National sevens team
Years	Team		Comps
2017–2018	Ireland 7s		

Alex McHenry (born 7 October 1997) is an Irish rugby union player for RFU Championship club Jersey Reds. He plays as a centre.

== Early life ==
Born in Cork, McHenry won the Munster Schools Rugby Senior Cup in 2016 with Christian Brothers College, alongside former Munster teammate Liam Coombes. Prior to this, McHenry had captained Munster under-19s to inter-provincial success in 2015, and also represented Munster under-18 Schools and Ireland under-19s.

== Career ==
=== Cork Constitution ===
McHenry was part of the Cork Con team that won a treble during the 2016–17 season, winning the All-Ireland League, All-Ireland Cup and Munster Senior Cup, as well as winning a second Senior Cup and All-Ireland League during the 2018–19 season, and a third Senior Cup during the 2019–20 season.

=== Munster ===
McHenry made his debut for Munster A against English RFU Championship side Doncaster Knights in round 6 of the 2016–17 British and Irish Cup on 13 January 2017. Munster A won the match 24–16 to secure a home quarter-final in the tournament, which they eventually won by defeating Jersey Reds 29–28 in the final in April 2017, though McHenry was not part of the team on the day. He went on to then join the Munster academy ahead of the 2017–18 season. McHenry played in all 6 of Munster A's fixtures during the 2018–19 Celtic Cup, and also played for the 'A' team in their 38–19 win against Major League Rugby side New England Free Jacks in the Cara Cup in April 2019.

Following the win against New England, McHenry, along with other teammates from the 'A' team, were recalled to join up with the senior squad, and he was subsequently named as a replacement for the 2018–19 Pro14 round 20 fixture against Italian side Benetton on 12 April 2019. McHenry made his senior competitive debut for Munster when he came on as a replacement for Sammy Arnold during the match, which Munster won 37–28. He joined the Munster senior squad on a one-year contract ahead of the 2020–21 season and extended that deal by a further year in February 2021. McHenry scored his first try for Munster in their 31–17 win against Italian side Benetton in round 16 of the 2020–21 Pro14 on 19 March 2021. McHenry left Munster at the end of the 2021–22 season.

=== Loan to Wasps ===
McHenry joined English Premiership Rugby club Wasps on loan in October 2021, providing cover for the injured Malakai Fekitoa. He made his debut for the club in their 56–15 defeat against Saracens in round 6 of the 2021–22 Premiership Rugby season on 24 October 2021.

=== Jersey Reds ===
McHenry joined RFU Championship club Jersey Reds ahead of the 2022–23 season, and won the Championship in his first season with the club.

=== Ireland ===
McHenry won his first cap for Ireland under-20s in their 2017 Six Nations Under 20s Championship clash with France on 24 February 2017, which Ireland won 27–22. He also featured for the Ireland 7s team during the 2017–18 season.

== Honours ==
=== Christian Brothers College ===
- Munster Schools Rugby Senior Cup:
  - Winner (1): 2016

=== Cork Constitution ===
- All-Ireland League Division 1A:
  - Winner (2): 2016–17, 2018–19
- All-Ireland Cup:
  - Winner (1): 2016–17
- Munster Senior Cup:
  - Winner (3): 2016–17, 2018–19, 2019–20

=== Jersey Reds ===
- RFU Championship:
  - Winner (1): 2022–23
