= Darren O'Shea =

Irish rugby union player

- Born: 12 December 1992 (age 33) Myrtleville, County Cork, Ireland
- Height: 2.06 m (6 ft 9 in)
- Weight: 117 kg (18.4 st; 258 lb)
- School: Colaiste Mhuire, Crosshaven

Rugby union career
- Position: Lock
Amateur team(s)
| Years | Team | Apps | (Points) |
| 20??–2014 | Crosshaven | | |
| 2016–2020 | Dolphin | | |
Senior career
| Years | Team | Apps | (Points) |
| 2014–2016 | Worcester | 27 | (15) |
| 2016–2020 | Munster | 44 | (10) |
| 2020– | Vannes | 28 | (0) |
- Correct as of 23 September 2021

Darren O'Shea (born 12 December 1992) is an Irish rugby union player. He plays as a lock for French Pro D2 club Vannes.

== Professional career ==
=== Worcester Warriors ===
Whilst still in the Munster Rugby Academy, O'Shea joined English side Worcester Warriors.

=== Munster ===
In March 2016, it was announced that O'Shea would be returning to his native Munster on a two-year contract, beginning in the 2016–17 season. In September 2016, O'Shea made his competitive debut for Munster when he came on as a substitute against Edinburgh in a 2016–17 Pro12 fixture. On 1 October 2016, O'Shea made his first start for Munster in the Pro14 fixture against Zebre. On 26 November 2016, O'Shea scored his first try for Munster in the sides 46–3 win against Benetton at Thomond Park. O'Shea made his European Rugby Champions Cup debut on 9 December 2017, coming off the bench in Munster's 33–10 Pool 4 win against Leicester Tigers. He signed a new two-year contract with Munster in February 2018. O'Shea left Munster at the end of the 2019–20 season.

=== Vannes ===
O'Shea joined French Pro D2 club Vannes ahead of the 2020–21 season.
