= Seán O'Connor (rugby union) =

Irish rugby union player (born 1996)

- Born: 22 August 1996 (age 30) Clonmel, County Tipperary, Ireland
- Height: 1.96 m (6 ft 5 in)
- Weight: 106 kg (16.7 st; 234 lb)
- School: Rockwell College
- University: Cork Institute of Technology

Rugby union career
- Position(s): Lock, Flanker
Amateur team(s)
Years	Team	Apps	(Points)
2015–2016	Cashel		
2016–2020	Garryowen		
Senior career
Years	Team	Apps	(Points)
2016–2020	Munster	9	(0)
2020–	Jersey Reds	10	(5)
- Correct as of 18 September 2021
International career
Years	Team	Apps	(Points)
2016	Ireland U20	7	(0)
- Correct as of 26 June 2016

Seán O'Connor (born 22 August 1996) is an Irish rugby union player. He can play as either a lock or a flanker and represents Jersey Reds in the RFU Championship.

== Early life ==
O'Connor was born in Clonmel, County Tipperary and first played rugby aged 6 with Cashel RFC. He attended Rockwell College and played three years of Junior and Senior Cup rugby, winning the latter as captain in 2015 when Rockwell beat Ardscoil Rís 23–13 in the final.

== Professional career ==
=== Munster ===
On 11 November 2016, O'Connor made his competitive debut for Munster when he came on as a substitute against Māori All Blacks in a capped friendly in Thomond Park, which Munster won 27–14. O'Connor made his first start for Munster on 1 September 2017, doing so in the sides opening fixture of the 2017–18 Pro14 against Benetton. He joined the senior squad on a one-year development contract for the 2019–20 season.

=== Jersey Reds ===
O'Connor left Munster at end of the 2019–20 season and joined RFU Championship side Jersey Reds ahead of the 2020–21 season.

== Ireland ==
O'Connor represented Ireland U20 at the 2016 World Rugby Under 20 Championship, coming on as a replacement in the famous 33–24 win against New Zealand U20, the team's first win against their Kiwi opponents in history.
