= Scott Buckley =

Irish rugby union player

- Born: 13 June 2000 (age 26) Kinsale, Ireland
- Height: 1.80 m (5 ft 11 in)
- Weight: 104 kg (16.4 st; 229 lb)
- School: Christian Brothers College
- University: University College Cork

Rugby union career
- Position: Hooker
Amateur team(s)
Years	Team	Apps	(Points)
- UCC
Senior career
Years	Team	Apps	(Points)
2021–	Munster	27	(20)
- Correct as of 23 February 2024

Scott Buckley (born 13 June 2000) is an Irish rugby union player who plays as a hooker for United Rugby Championship club Munster.

== Early life ==
Buckley attended Christian Brothers College and captained the school to victory in the 2019 Munster Schools Rugby Senior Cup, scoring the crucial try that secured a 5–3 win against fierce rivals Presentation Brothers College in the final and a record 30th cup for Christians.

== Munster ==
Buckley had a series of strong performances for Munster A during the 2019–20 Celtic Cup, and captained the side in their 36–10 away defeat against Dragons A in August 2019, though a hamstring injury meant that he missed the majority of the campaign. Buckley joined the Munster academy ahead of the 2020–21 season. Following the disruption caused by the province's recent tour to South Africa, Buckley made his senior competitive debut for Munster in their opening 2021–22 Champions Cup fixture away to English club Wasps on 12 December 2021, scoring a try and earning the player of the match award in the province's 35–14 away win. He joined Munster's senior squad on a two-year contract from the 2022–23 season.

== Ireland ==
Buckley has represented Ireland at under-18 and under-19 level.

== Honours ==
=== Munster ===
- United Rugby Championship
  - Winner (1): 2022–23
