= Liam O'Connor (rugby union) =

Irish rugby union player

- Born: 13 July 1995 (age 31) Cork, Ireland
- Height: 1.78 m (5 ft 10 in)
- Weight: 110 kg (17 st; 240 lb)
- School: Christian Brothers College

Rugby union career
- Position: Prop
Amateur team(s)
Years	Team	Apps	(Points)
2014–2023	Cork Constitution		
Senior career
Years	Team	Apps	(Points)
2016–2023	Munster	34	(0)
- Correct as of 10 November 2022
International career
Years	Team	Apps	(Points)
2015	Ireland U20	5	(5)
- Correct as of 20 June 2015

Liam O'Connor (born 13 July 1995) is an Irish former rugby union player who played as a prop for United Rugby Championship club Munster.

== Early life ==
O'Connor was born in Cork and first played rugby aged 7 with Dolphin RFC. He then attended Christian Brothers College and represented the school in Junior and Senior Cup rugby. He has played for Munster at Under-18, Under-19, Under-20 and 'A' level, as well as representing Ireland at Under-19 and Under-20 level. O'Connor also played football at underage level for Delaneys and, aged just 16, played in goal for St. Nicks in the Cork Senior Football Championship.

== Munster ==
On 16 January 2016, O'Connor made his competitive debut for Munster when he came on as a substitute against Stade Français in a 2015–16 European Rugby Champions Cup fixture. O'Connor made his first start for Munster on 1 September 2017, doing so in the sides opening fixture of the 2017–18 Pro14 against Benetton. He signed a two-year senior contract with Munster in January 2018. O'Connor was nominated for the 2018 John McCarthy Award for Academy Player of the Year in April 2018. O'Connor made his return from a knee injury sustained during Munster's game against Ospreys in December 2017 in their fixture against Dragons on 26 January 2019.

O'Connor signed a two-year contract extension with Munster in January 2020, and signed a one-year contract extension in January 2022. He featured off the bench in Munster's historic 28–14 win against a South Africa XV in Páirc Uí Chaoimh on 10 November 2022, but was forced to retire on medical grounds upon the conclusion of the 2022–23 season.

== Honours ==
=== Munster ===
- United Rugby Championship
  - Winner (1): 2022–23
