= Cian Hurley =

Irish rugby union player

- Born: 25 April 2000 (age 26) Johannesburg, South Africa
- Height: 1.96 m (6 ft 5 in)
- Weight: 106 kg (16.7 st; 234 lb)
- School: Christian Brothers College
- University: University of Limerick

Rugby union career
- Position(s): Lock, Back-row
Amateur team(s)
Years	Team	Apps	(Points)
- Clonakilty
2019–	Garryowen		
Senior career
Years	Team	Apps	(Points)
2021–2025	Munster	6	(0)
2025–	Southland Stags	1	(0)
- Correct as of 5 September 2025
International career
Years	Team	Apps	(Points)
2018–2019	Ireland Schools		
2020	Ireland U20	0	(0)

Cian Hurley (born 25 April 2000) is an Irish rugby union player who plays for Southland as a lock.

== Early life ==
Hurley was born in Johannesburg, South Africa, where his parents, Eoin and Catherine, had moved for work. The family returned to Ireland when Hurley was 13 and settled in Clonakilty, West Cork. Hurley first played rugby aged 8 in South Africa, but only began taking the sport seriously when he represented Clonakilty at under-13 and under-14 level. He attended Christian Brothers College and was on the losing side against Glenstal Abbey in the final of the 2018 Munster Schools Rugby Senior Cup. However, one year later Hurley tasted success in the tournament when CBC defeated fierce inter-city rivals Presentation Brothers College 5–3 to win their 30th senior schools title.

Hurley played for and captained the Munster under-18 schools side, as well as representing the Irish Schools team, for whom he was a regular over two years following his move to Limerick club Garryowen. He became the first West Cork player to captain a Munster team in the professional era when he led the Munster Development team in their 43–27 defeat against the Ireland under-20s in January 2020. Hurley is a student at the University of Limerick.

== Munster ==
Hurley was rewarded for his performances for Munster A during the 2020–21 season with a place in Munster's academy in January 2021. Munster head coach Johann van Graan handed Hurley his senior competitive debut for the province in their 2020–21 Pro14 round 16 fixture against Italian side Benetton on 19 March 2021, playing the full 80 minutes in Munster's 31–17 win. Hurley featured off the bench in Munster's historic 28–14 win against a South Africa XV in Páirc Uí Chaoimh on 10 November 2022, and he will join Munster's senior squad on a one-year contract from the 2023–24 season.

== Southland ==
Hurley was released by Munster in 2025, signing with New Zealand provincial side Southland.

== Ireland ==
Hurley was selected in the Ireland under-20s squad for the 2020 Six Nations Under 20s Championship, however, he'd made no appearances for the side before the tournament was suspended and eventually cancelled due to the COVID-19 pandemic.

== Honours ==
=== Munster ===
- United Rugby Championship
  - Winner (1): 2022–23
