= Sammy Arnold =

Irish rugby union player (born 1996)

- Born: 8 April 1996 (age 30) Surrey, England
- Height: 1.81 m (5 ft 11 1/2 in)
- Weight: 102 kg (16.1 st; 225 lb)
- School: Uplands Community College

Rugby union career
- Position: Centre
Amateur team(s)
Years	Team	Apps	(Points)
2015–2016	Ballynahinch		
2016–	Garryowen		
Senior career
Years	Team	Apps	(Points)
2015–2016	Ulster	15	(0)
2016–2020	Munster	45	(40)
2020–2022	Connacht	38	(40)
2022–2024	Brive	27	(25)
2024–	Newcastle Red Bulls	30	(10)
- Correct as of 12 August 2025
International career
Years	Team	Apps	(Points)
2015	Ireland U20	10	(0)
2018	Ireland	1	(0)
- Correct as of 24 November 2018

Sammy Arnold (born 8 April 1996) is an Irish rugby union player for Prem Rugby club Newcastle Red Bulls. He plays as a centre.

== Early life ==
Born in Redhill, Surrey, Arnold moved to Kent aged five and attended a state school until sixth form, when he earned a rugby scholarship at Cranleigh School. Harlequins had shown interest in Arnold joining their academy, but as a scrum-half rather than a centre.

== Club career ==
=== Ulster ===
Arnold made his debut against Dragons at Rodney Parade in March 2015 as an 18-year-old. At the end of the season he won the Club's Academy Player of the Year award. He made his first Champions Cup appearance against Oyonnax in January 2016, but was forced off through injury after 23 minutes.

=== Munster ===
On 4 February 2016, it was announced that Arnold would be joining Ulster's provincial rivals, Munster, at the beginning of the 2016–17 season. Just weeks after joining Munster, Arnold damaged ligaments in his knee, which ruled him out of the opening period of the 2016–17 season. On 26 November 2016, Arnold made his competitive debut for Munster, starting alongside Jaco Taute in the 2016–17 Pro12 fixture against Benetton at Thomond Park. In January 2017, Arnold was ruled out for 8 weeks with a knee injury. On 27 February 2017, Arnold resumed full training following his recovering from the knee injury.

On 31 March 2017, Arnold started for Munster A in their 2016–17 British and Irish Cup semi-final against Ealing Trailfinders, scoring a try in the 25–9 win against the English Championship side at CIT. On 21 April 2017, Arnold started at 13 for Munster A in their 29–28 victory over English RFU Championship side Jersey Reds in the final of the 2016–17 British and Irish Cup, which was held in Irish Independent Park. He scored his first tries for Munster on 3 November 2017, doing so in the 2017–18 Pro14 win against Welsh side Dragons. Arnold made his European Rugby Champions Cup debut for Munster on 9 December 2017, starting in the Pool 4 fixture against Leicester Tigers in Thomond Park and earning the Man-of-the-Match award in the provinces' 33–10 win.

He was sent-off for a high tackle on Christian Lealiifano in Munster's Pro14 game against Ulster on 1 January 2018 and subsequently banned for 3 weeks. He signed a new two-year contract with Munster in February 2018. Arnold was named the Munster Rugby Young Player of the Year in April 2018.

=== Connacht ===
Arnold joined Connacht on a two-year contract in July 2020, and made his debut for the province against his old club Munster on 30 August 2020.

=== Brive ===
Arnold moved to France to join Brive, on a three-year contract from the 2022–23 season.

=== Newcastle Red Bulls ===
On 19 July 2024, Arnold returns to the UK as he signs for English side Newcastle Red Bulls, then known as Newcastle Falcons, in the Premiership Rugby on a two-year deal from the 2024-25 season. On 29 November 2024, despite a yellow card in the closing stages of the game he helped his side to their first win over Saracens since 2009.

== International career ==
After achieving selection at under-18 level in May 2013, Arnold received his first call up for the Ireland under-20 side in February 2015 for a 2015 Six Nations Under 20s Championship clash with France.

Arnold earned his first senior call-up in October 2018, being selected in Joe Schmidt's 42-man Ireland squad for the 2018 Autumn Internationals. Arnold made his senior international debut for Ireland in their 2018 Autumn Test against the United States on 24 November 2018, coming on as a replacement for Will Addison at half-time in Ireland's 57–14 win.

== Honours ==
=== Munster A ===
- British and Irish Cup:
  - Winner (1): 2016–17
