= Keynan Knox =

South African rugby union player

- Born: 6 April 1999 (age 27) South Africa
- Height: 1.85 m (6 ft 1 in)
- Weight: 115 kg (18.1 st; 254 lb)
- School: Michaelhouse (South Africa)

Rugby union career
- Position: Prop
Youth career
- 2017: Sharks U18
Amateur team(s)
Years	Team	Apps	(Points)
2018-2019	Young Munster RFC		
- Correct as of 14 May 2026
Senior career
Years	Team	Apps	(Points)
2019-2023	Munster	33	(15)
2024-2025	Bourgoin	20	(5)
2025–26	USON Nevers	21	(0)
2026-	Ulster	6	(5)
- Correct as of 31 October 2026

Keynan Knox (born 6 April 1999) is a South African rugby union player who plays as a prop for URC side Ulster.

== Early life ==
Born in South Africa, Knox attended Michaelhouse, a boarding school where Springboks such as Ruan Combrinck, Ross Cronjé, Patrick Lambie and Pat Cilliers, and South African-born Ireland international Robbie Diack and former Munster player Pat Howard also attended.

== Youth rugby ==
Knox captained Michaelhouse's first XV rugby team during 2017, and featured for the Sharks provincial side during the under-18 Craven Week (also in 2017), where his set-piece and general play impressed.

== Professional career ==
On the back of strong performances at school level, Knox caught the attention of then-Munster CEO Garrett Fitzgerald, and he moved to Ireland upon finishing school to join the provinces academy setup in December 2017. He featured in all five of Munster A's fixtures during the 2018–19 Celtic Cup, and signed a three-year contract with the province in February 2019, which saw Knox complete year three of the academy before progressing to the senior squad.

Because Knox joined Munster's academy before 31 December 2017, he qualified for Ireland based on residency in 2020, as this was before World Rugby changed the residency period a player must serve before qualifying for a country from three to five years. He made his senior competitive debut for Munster on 28 September 2019, featuring as a replacement in the provinces opening 2019–20 Pro14 39–9 win against Welsh side Dragons in Thomond Park, and he made his first start for the province in their 33–23 win against Cardiff Blues on 2 November 2019.

Knox scored his first try for Munster in their 31–17 win against Italian side Benetton in round 16 of the 2020–21 Pro14 on 19 March 2021, and made his Champions Cup debut for Munster in their 2021–22 pool B round 2 fixture at home to French club Castres on 18 December 2021, coming on as a replacement for John Ryan in the province's 19–13 win. Knox signed a two-year contract extension in January 2022. He featured off the bench in Munster's historic 28–14 win against a South Africa XV in Páirc Uí Chaoimh on 10 November 2022.

On 14 February 2024, Munster Rugby announced that Knox had completed his contract and would be leaving with immediate effect.He played one season for Bourgoin in the French Nationale division, making 20 appearances, and one season with Nevers in the Pro D2, making 21 appearances including 18 starts, before signing for Ulster ahead of the 2026-27 season.

== Honours ==
=== Munster ===
- United Rugby Championship
  - Winner (1): 2022–23
