= Roman Salanoa =

American rugby union player (born 1997)

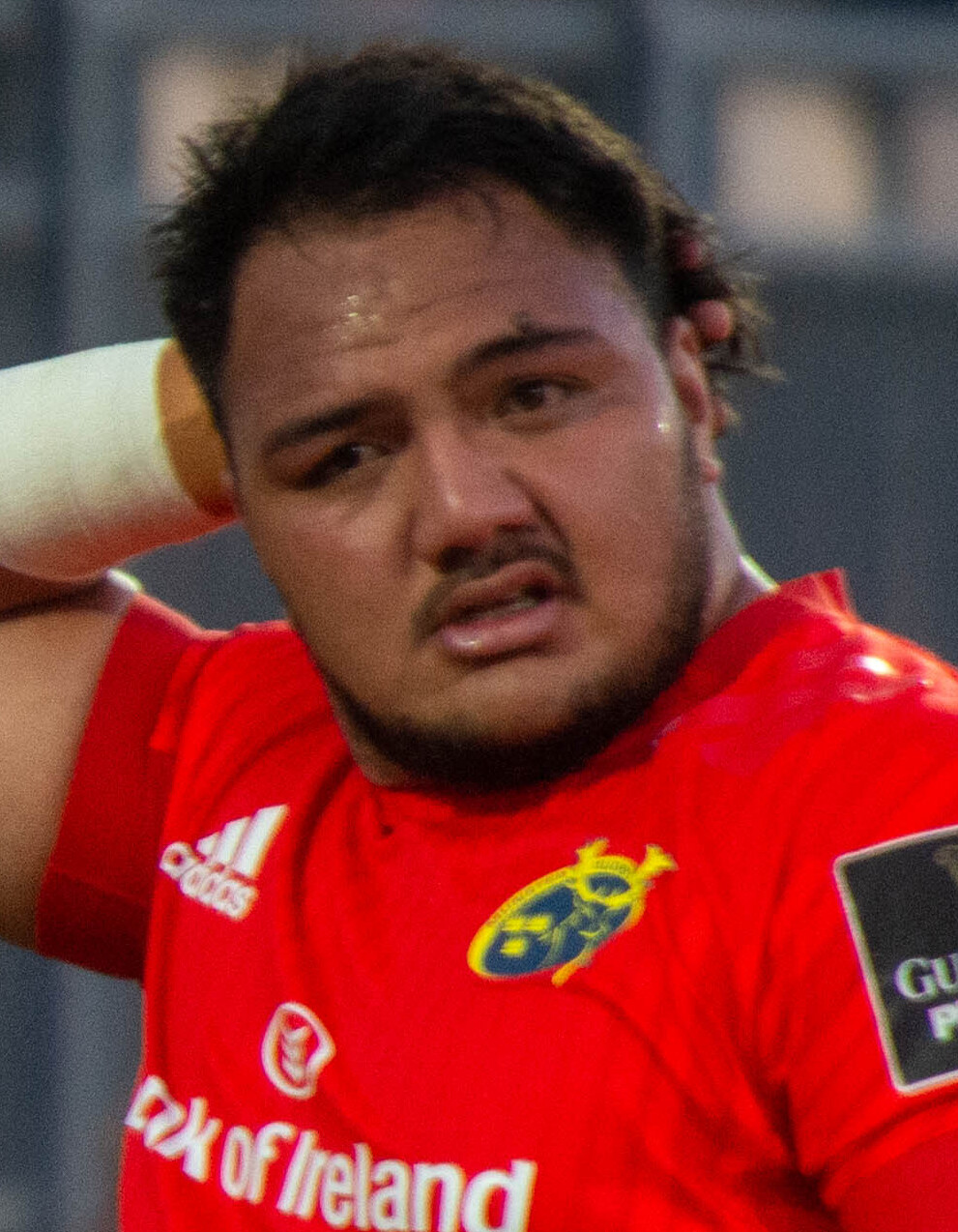
- Salanoa in 2021
- Born: 28 October 1997 (age 29) Laie, Hawaii, United States
- Height: 1.83 m (6 ft 0 in)
- Weight: 123 kg (19.4 st; 271 lb)
- School: Kahuku High

Rugby union career
- Position: Prop
Amateur team(s)
Years	Team	Apps	(Points)
2017–2020	Old Belvedere		
2020–	Shannon		
Senior career
Years	Team	Apps	(Points)
2019–2020	Leinster	3	(0)
2020–	Munster	30	(10)
- Correct as of 27 May 2023
International career
Years	Team	Apps	(Points)
2016	United States U20	4	(0)
2022	Emerging Ireland	3	(0)
- Correct as of 9 October 2022

Roman Salanoa (born 28 October 1997) is an American-born, Irish-qualified rugby union player who plays as a prop for United Rugby Championship club Munster.

== Early life ==
Salanoa was born in Oahu, the third largest of the Hawaiian Islands. He has Samoan ancestry. He attended Kahuku High & Intermediate School and, after helping the school win a state championship in American football in 2015, Salanoa earned an All-State selection as a defensive linesman.

== Rugby union ==
In his final year of high school, Salanoa began playing rugby union for Kahuku High, and he helped the school to a state championship in the sport, the second such accolade for Salanoa. Aged 18 and having played only a handful of games in the sport, Salanoa was then selected in the United States national under-20 rugby union team for the 2016 World Rugby Under 20 Trophy, where they finished fifth.

=== Move to Ireland ===
Following his performances for the United States under-20s team, a week-long trial was arranged for Salanoa with Irish provincial team Leinster in late 2016. He returned to Ireland to join Leinster's sub-academy in September 2017, and he also joined Dublin-based club Old Belvedere, playing for the club's under-20s.

Salanoa progressed to Old Belvedere's senior side, playing in Division 1B of the All-Ireland League, whilst also featuring for Leinster A in the 2018 Cara Cup, a tournament hosted in the United States between Major League Rugby side the New England Free Jacks and the 'A' teams for each of the four Irish provincial clubs. After training with the senior squad during 2019–20 pre-season, Salanoa made his non-competitive debut for Leinster as a replacement in their 47–17 friendly win against English side Coventry in August 2019, before making his senior competitive debut as a replacement in Leinster's 54–42 win against provincial rivals Ulster in round 8 of the 2019–20 Pro14 on 20 December 2019.

=== Munster ===
Salanoa moved to Leinster's rivals Munster ahead of the 2020–21 season on a two-year contract, and made his competitive debut for the province in their 2020–21 Pro14 round two fixture against Scottish side Edinburgh on 10 October 2020, which Munster won 25–23. Salanoa scored his first try for Munster in their 31–17 win against Italian side Benetton in round 16 of the 2020–21 Pro14 on 19 March 2021, and made his Champions Cup debut for the province in their 35–14 away win against English club Wasps in round 1 of the 2021–22 Champions Cup on 12 December 2021. Salanoa signed a three-year contract extension with Munster in January 2022. He started in Munster's historic 28–14 win against a South Africa XV in Páirc Uí Chaoimh on 10 November 2022, and came on as a replacement in Munster's 19–14 win against the Stormers in the final of the 2022–23 United Rugby Championship on 27 May 2023.

=== International career with Ireland ===
Salanoa was selected in the Emerging Ireland squad that travelled to South Africa to participate in the Toyota Challenge against Currie Cup teams Free State Cheetahs, Griquas and Pumas in September–October 2022. He featured as a replacement in Emerging Ireland's 54–7 opening win against Griquas on 30 September, started in the 28–24 win against the Pumas on 5 October, before featuring as a replacement again in the 21–14 win against the Cheetahs on 9 October.

Following the Toyota Challenge, Salanoa was also selected in the Ireland A panel that joined the senior Ireland team after round 7 of the 2022–23 United Rugby Championship to face an All Blacks XV on 4 November 2022. After Tadhg Furlong was ruled out of Ireland's opening round fixture of the 2023 Six Nations Championship against Wales, Salanoa provided injury cover with the senior squad.

== Honours ==
=== Munster ===
- United Rugby Championship
  - Winner (1): 2022–23
