= Kevin O'Byrne =

Irish rugby union player

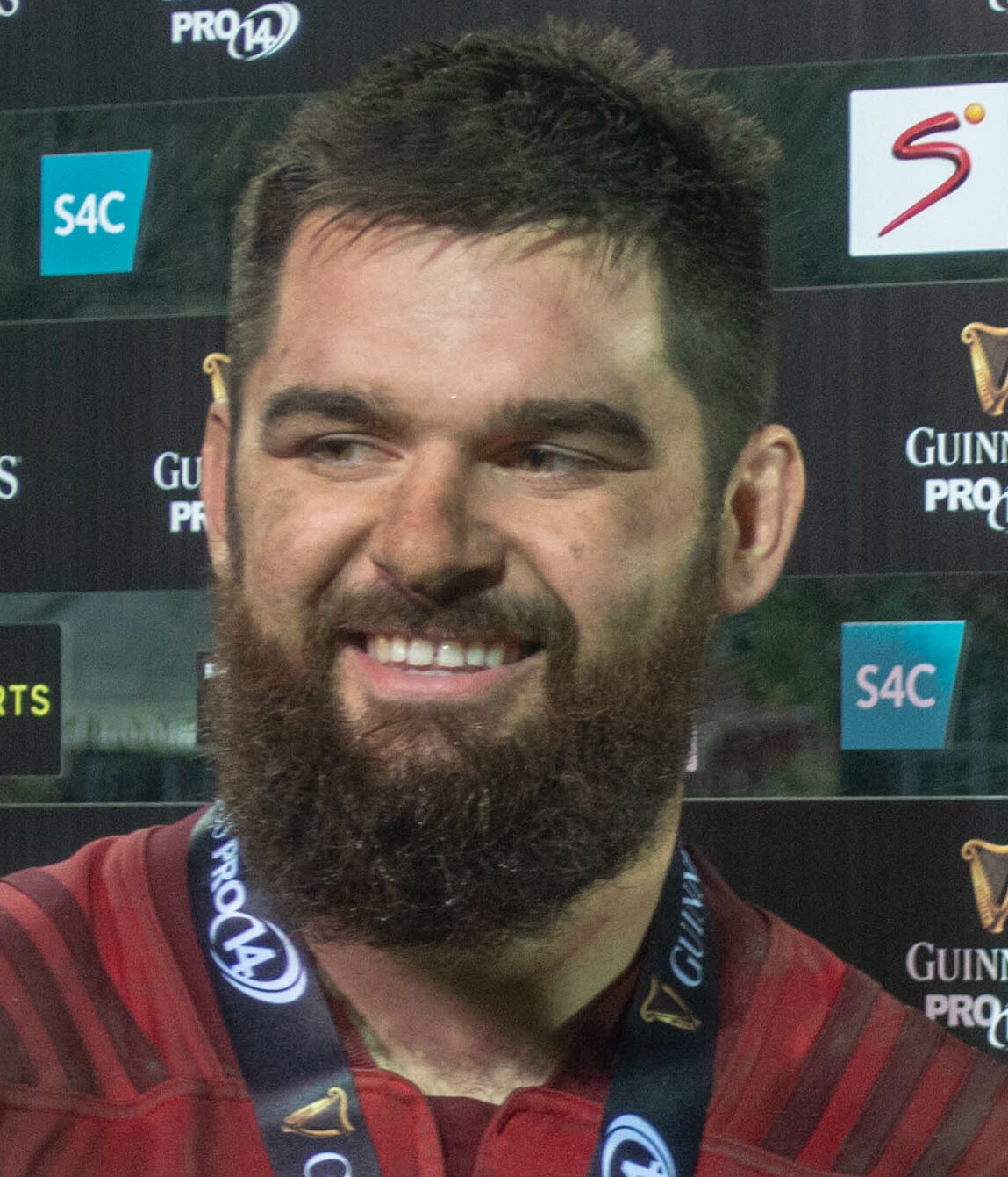
- Born: 16 April 1991 (age 35) Cork, Ireland
- Height: 1.80 m (5 ft 11 in)
- Weight: 105 kg (16.5 st; 231 lb)
- School: Presentation Brothers College

Rugby union career
- Position: Hooker
Amateur team(s)
Years	Team	Apps	(Points)
- UCC
- Highfield
- UL Bohemians
- Cork Constitution
Senior career
Years	Team	Apps	(Points)
2014–2022	Munster	90	(40)
2022–	Ealing	2	(0)
- Correct as of 11 February 2023

Kevin O'Byrne (born 16 April 1991) is an Irish rugby union player for English club Ealing Trailfinders in the RFU Championship. He plays as a hooker.

== Early life ==
He captained the Munster under-18s club side during the 2008–09 inter-provincials and was part of Highfield under-18s All-Ireland winning squad in 2009.

== Career ==
=== Munster ===
O'Byrne made his Munster debut on 5 September 2014, starting against Edinburgh in the first game of the 2014–15 Pro12 season. He signed a one-year development contract with Munster in March 2015. On 3 September 2016, O'Byrne went off injured in Munster's 2016–17 Pro12 fixture against Scarlets. He was subsequently ruled out for 3 months with an elbow injury.

O'Byrne made his European Rugby Champions Cup debut for Munster on 21 October 2017, doing so when he came on as a replacement for Rhys Marshall in the round 2 fixture against Racing 92. He scored his first try for Munster on 3 November 2017, having come on as a replacement in the 2017–18 Pro14 fixture against Welsh side Dragons, which Munster won 49–6.

He signed a two-year contract extension with Munster in January 2018. He earned the Man-of-the-Match award in Munster's 30–26 away win against South African side Cheetahs during the 2018–19 Pro14 on 4 November 2018. O'Byrne won his 50th cap for Munster in their opening 2019–20 Pro14 fixture against Welsh side Dragons on 28 September 2019, a match Munster won 39–9.

He signed a two-year contract extension with Munster in March 2020, a deal that will see O'Byrne remain with the province until at least June 2022. O'Byrne was rewarded for a series of strong performances by being named in the 2020–21 Pro14 Dream Team. O'Byrne departed Munster at the end of the 2021–22 season.

=== Ealing Trailfinders ===
O'Byrne joined English RFU Championship side Ealing Trailfinders from the 2022–23 season.

=== Marlow ===
O’Byrne was appointed Director of Coaching at Marlow RUFC, Buckinghamshire in Summer 2024.

== Honours ==
Individual

- United Rugby Championship Dream Team: 2020–21
