= 2021–22 Munster Rugby season =

- Ground(s): Thomond Park (Capacity: 25,600) (Note: Thomond Park's official capacity is 25,600 but can be expanded up to 26,276 with temporary seating.); Musgrave Park (Capacity: 8,008)
- Chairman: Gerry O'Shea
- CEO: Ian Flanagan
- President: Seán McCullough
- Coach: Johann van Graan
- Captain: Peter O'Mahony
- Most appearances: Two players: Jack O'Donoghue (23); Fineen Wycherley (23)
- Top scorer: Ben Healy (123)
- Most tries: Two players: Jack O'Donoghue (9); Simon Zebo (9)
- League: United Rugby Championship
- 2021–22 United Rugby Championship: 3rd in Irish shield 6th in league Quarter-finals

The 2021–22 Munster Rugby season was Munster's twenty-first season competing in the United Rugby Championship, alongside which they also competed in the European Rugby Champions Cup. It was Johann van Graan's fifth and final season as head coach.

== Events ==
The big news in terms of player movements ahead of the 2021–22 season was the retirement of three club stalwarts: Billy Holland, CJ Stander and Tommy O'Donnell, and the return to the province of the club's record try scorer Simon Zebo after three seasons with French club Racing 92.

Fly-half JJ Hanrahan left the province to join French club Clermont, whilst winger Alex Wootton departed to join Connacht on a permanent basis, having spent the previous season on loan at the western province. Scrum-half Nick McCarthy left to re-join his native province Leinster, whilst prop James Cronin joined French club Biarritz, who had recently been promoted to the Top 14, and hooker Rhys Marshall was released by the province and returned to New Zealand, where he joined North Harbour. Centre Alex McHenry joined English club Wasps on loan in October 2021, and new signing Declan Moore joined Ulster as short-term injury cover in late December 2021 and on loan in February 2022.

Nine academy players were promoted to the senior squad: Thomas Ahern, Jack Crowley, Jack Daly, Jake Flannery, James French, Seán French, Ben Healy, John Hodnett and Josh Wycherley. South African lock Jason Jenkins joined the senior squad from Japanese club Toyota Verblitz, scrum-half Rowan Osborne joined from Leinster, and hooker Declan Moore, who was on the books with Australian Super Rugby side Melbourne Rebels, joined for the season. Shannon scrum-half Aran Hehir joined the senior squad in late February 2022 to provide cover whilst Craig Casey, Ethan Coughlan and Conor Murray were away on international duty and Rowan Osborne was injured.

In coaching news, former Munster assistant coach Ian Costello returned to the province to become their academy manager, having spent the previous five seasons working in England as head coach of RFU Championship club Nottingham and, since 2018, defence coach at Premiership club Wasps. Sports psychologist Caroline Currid, renowned in Ireland for her work with the Limerick hurlers who won back-to-back All-Ireland's in 2020 and 2021, joined the province's backroom team in a part-time role.

Three players joined year one of the academy: prop Mark Donnelly, back-row Daniel Okeke and scrum-half Ethan Coughlan, whilst Leinster academy scrum-half Paddy Patterson, who spent part of the previous season on a short-term contract with Munster, joined year three of the academy. Three additional players joined the academy in November 2021: lock Edwin Edogbo, fly-half Tony Butler and back-three Patrick Campbell.

With the four South African Super Rugby teams - the Bulls, the Lions, the Sharks and the Stormers - joining the league ahead of the 2021–22 season, the Pro14 was rebranded and restructured as the United Rugby Championship. The teams were divided into regional pools, with Munster joining their provincial rivals Connacht, Leinster and Ulster in the Irish pool. The regular season took place over 18 rounds; Munster played their pool opponents home and away, and played home or away fixtures against the other 12 teams in the league. All sixteen teams were ranked in one league table after the 18 rounds, with the top 8 teams qualifying for the quarter-finals, followed by semi-finals and a grand final.

Eight teams qualified from the United Rugby Championship for the Champions Cup. The highest ranked team from each pool qualified for the Champions Cup, with the remaining four qualification spots going to the next four highest-ranked teams in the single league table who have not already qualified from their pool. Subject to approvals, the South African teams will be eligible for the Champions & Challenge Cup.

The province was drawn in pool B for the 2021–22 European Rugby Champions Cup pool stage, and faced French club Castres, whom Munster have met in nine previous Champions Cup seasons in a record 16 fixtures, and English club Wasps, who defeated Munster in a classic semi-final in the old Lansdowne Road in 2004, and whom the province last met during the 2007–08 tournament, which Munster went on to win.

Munster opened their 2021–22 United Rugby Championship campaign with a bonus-point 42–17 win against the Sharks, one of the four new South African teams, on 25 September 2021. Simon Zebo, making his return for the province, scored two tries, extending his club record to 62, with Gavin Coombes continuing his try-scoring exploits from the previous season with two tries of his own. Chris Cloete and player of the match Craig Casey also crossed the try line. Fly-half Joey Carbery scored seven points off the kicking tee, with his replacement Ben Healy contributing five points off the tee in the second-half. RG Snyman made his eagerly-awaited return from long-term injury as a second-half replacement, and scrum-half Rowan Osborne made his competitive debut for the province, in a match that saw fans return to Thomond Park for the first time since February 2020.

Munster were in South Africa for rounds 6 and 7 of the United Rugby Championship, in which they were due to play the Bulls and the Lions, however, the emergence of the omicron variant of COVID-19 led to travel restrictions being implemented by UK and EU authorities, meaning the fixtures had to be postponed. 34 players and staff arrived back in Ireland on 1 December 2021 and immediately entered 10 days of mandatory self-isolation. 14 players and staff who had tested positive for COVID-19 had to remain in South Africa.

In the wake of this disruption for Munster and other clubs, and with Munster's opening Champions Cup fixture away to Wasps falling on 12 December, the EPCR extended the deadline for registering players for the tournament to 8 December, meaning Munster could look to supplement their squad with short-term signings, and 22 players were subsequently registered with the province's Champions Cup squad.

A depleted Munster squad made up of internationals who'd been away with Ireland during the Autumn tests, academy players and members of the national and provincial talent squads travelled over to England to face Wasps on their opening Champions Cup fixture on 12 December 2021. The team, which featured 12 debutantes, defeated their opponents 35–14 in front of a large contingent of Munster fans who had made the journey to Coventry.

Munster made it back-to-back wins in the Champions Cup with a gritty 19–13 win at home against French club Castres on 18 December 2021, with a 58th minute try from number 8 Jack O'Donoghue and 14 points off the tee from fly-half Ben Healy being enough for the province to see off their opposition.

Following the 10–8 defeat away to Connacht on 1 January 2022, the province received criticism for its style of play, or lack thereof, aimed in particular at head coach Johann van Graan, who had recently confirmed his departure from the province at the end of the season. Critics also pointed to the poor performance in defeat against the Ospreys back in October 2021, prior to the COVID-19 issues the province faced in South Africa and the first two rounds of the Champions Cup, and also to the dour win against Castres in round two of the Champions Cup. Former captain Donal Lenihan, writing in the Irish Examiner, said: "If Munster continue in the vein of the last two limp attacking efforts against Castres and Connacht, then you can forget about any prospect of breaking the trophy drought for another season,", whilst club legend Alan Quinlan described the performance against Connacht as "dreadful", before adding; "Look, you have to acknowledge there has been a lot of good in the last few years, I do want to say that.".

Eddie O'Sullivan, former Ireland coach and Munster player, added: "If you want a cameo to show people how Munster have not developed in attack, show them the last five minutes of that first half against Connacht.". Keith Wood, another former Munster player and an Ireland legend, was similarly critical of the province, describing the display against Connacht as "turgid nonsense", adding "There's no point in talking about Munster's attack, that doesn’t exist at the present moment in time. I think we're beginning to ruin some of the players. I'm finding it incredibly hard to watch." Munster forwards coach Graham Rowntree, speaking to the media ahead of the province's fixture against Ulster the following week, described the performance as "more than disappointing" and "very frustrating", but added that a series of clear-the-air meetings had been held, saying "It can only be good to get it all out on the table and clear the air and people air some things.".

In the reverse fixture against Castres in round 3 of the Champions Cup on 14 January 2022, Munster earned a 16–13 away win thanks to a 77th minute try from Gavin Coombes, converted by rookie fly-half Jack Crowley, who was faultless off the kicking tee in his first European start for the province. The win secured a place in the knockout stage of the tournament for Munster. Nine days later, Munster followed up their away win against Castres with a 45–7 home win against Wasps, with the tries coming from Jeremy Loughman, Conor Murray, Jack O'Donoghue, who was player of the match on the occasion of his 150th cap for Munster, Rory Scannell and Simon Zebo, who scored a brace to become Munster's all-time leading try-scorer in the Champions Cup and the leading Irish try-scorer in the competition overall. Fly-half Ben Healy and his replacement on the day, Jack Crowley, were both 100% from the kicking tee, with Healy scoring four conversions and a penalty, and Crowley adding two late conversions. The win secured home advantage for Munster in the second leg of the round of 16.

Munster faced English club Exeter Chiefs in the round of 16, and lost the first leg of the tie 13–8 away to the Premiership club on 9 April 2022. Exeter took a 10–0 lead in to half-time after tries from Stuart Hogg and Jacques Vermeulen, before Munster fly-half Ben Healy hit back with a penalty to reduce the home sides lead. Hogg responded for Exeter with a drop-goal, but a 66th minute try from Shane Daly brought Munster back within touching distance on the scoreboard, and Exeter had to withstand some intense offensive play from Munster going into the final ten minutes, with replacement scrum-half Craig Casey almost drawing the scores level, before the hosts themselves assaulted the Munster try-line in the last minutes of the match in an ultimately unsuccessful attempt to extend their lead.

Needing to overturn a five-point deficit to advance in the competition, Munster welcomed Exeter to Thomond Park for the second leg of their last 16 tie one week later. Fly-half Joey Carbery, returning from injury, opened the scoring for the hosts with a penalty, but the visitors responded with their first try of the game to take an early 5–3 lead, before Carbery struck back for Munster with a try of his own, to which he added a second penalty to give Munster a 13–5 half-time lead. Exeter struck first in the second-half with a try in the 47th minute, but Carbery kept Munster in front with two further penalties, before centre Damian de Allende scored a 74th minute try to secure a 26–10 home win for Munster and a 34–23 victory on aggregate, ensuring Munster progressed to a record 19th Champions Cup quarter-final.

Facing defending champions Toulouse, who knocked the province out of the previous season's tournament, in the quarter-final, Munster began strongly with an 11th minute Alex Kendellen try, converted by Joey Carbery to lead 7–0, but Romain Ntamack hit back for Toulouse two minutes later with a try of his own, converted by Thomas Ramos, to level the scores. The visitors were dominating the scrum and scored their second try in the 25th minute when Matthis Lebel touched down, with Ramos again converting to give Toulouse a 14–7 lead. However, Munster struck back with a Keith Earls try just before half-time which Carbery converted to leave the scores level heading into the break. The home side came out firing in the second-half, with Mike Haley scoring a 43rd minute try, again converted by Carbery, to give Munster a 21–14 lead, which Carbery extended with a penalty in the 56th minute, but Toulouse responded with Lebel's second try in the 66th minute which, when converted by Ramos, reduced the margin to just three points heading into the final ten minutes. A 75th-minute penalty from Ramos levelled the scores at 24–24, and that remained the score at full-time after Ben Healy missed with a 56-metre penalty attempt in the final minute of normal time.

With the scores level at full-time and as both teams scored three tries, extra time ensued, played over two ten-minute halves, but even after that the two teams could not be separated after three missed drop goals between the two, and the game went to a penalty shootout. Munster went first and Conor Murray scored his penalty. Antoine Dupont responded successfully for Toulouse, but Ben Healy missed his first attempt, and when Thomas Ramos scored his penalty, it was advantage Toulouse. Carbery scored his penalty, but Romain Ntamack scored his own to restore Toulouse's lead. Murray missed with his second attempt, whilst Dupont was successful with his own to give Toulouse a 4–2 lead, meaning Healy had to score with his second attempt to give Munster any hope, but he was unable to do so, and Toulouse advanced to the semi-finals, knocking Munster out of the competition for the second season in a row.

A 35–25 defeat away to Leinster in round 18 of the 2021–22 United Rugby Championship meant that Munster finished sixth in the league overall, and third in the Irish Shield, and the province headed north to face Ulster in the quarter-finals on 3 June 2022, but Munster lost 36–17 to bring the curtain down on their 2021–22 season, as well as Johann van Graan's tenure as head coach.

== Player movements ==
Below are the players who joined and left the Munster senior and academy squads ahead of the 2021–22 season. Italics indicates players that transferred during the 2021–22 season.

=== Senior squad ===
Players in

- (Ireland) Jake Flannery promoted from Academy
- (Ireland) James French promoted from Academy
- (Ireland) Seán French promoted from Academy
- (Ireland) Ben Healy promoted from Academy
- (Ireland) John Hodnett promoted from Academy
- (Ireland) Thomas Ahern promoted from Academy
- (Ireland) Jack Crowley promoted from Academy
- (Ireland) Jack Daly promoted from Academy
- (South Africa) Jason Jenkins from (Japan) Toyota Verblitz
- (Ireland) Josh Wycherley promoted from Academy
- (Ireland) Simon Zebo from (France) Racing 92
- (Ireland) Rowan Osborne from (Ireland) Leinster
- (Australia) Declan Moore from (Australia) Sydney University
- (Ireland) Aran Hehir from (Ireland) Shannon (short-term cover)

Players out

- (Ireland) Billy Holland retired
- (Ireland) Alex Wootton to (Ireland) Connacht
- (Ireland) CJ Stander retired
- (Ireland) JJ Hanrahan to (France) Clermont
- (Ireland) Nick McCarthy to (Ireland) Leinster
- (Ireland) Tommy O'Donnell retired
- (Ireland) James Cronin to (France) Biarritz
- (New Zealand) Rhys Marshall to (New Zealand) North Harbour
- (Ireland) Alex McHenry to (England) Wasps (loan)
- (Australia) Declan Moore to (Ireland) Ulster (injury cover & loan)

=== Academy squad ===
Players in

- (Ireland) Ethan Coughlan
- (Ireland) Mark Donnelly
- (Ireland) Daniel Okeke
- (Ireland) Paddy Patterson from (Ireland) Leinster
- (Ireland) Tony Butler
- (Ireland) Patrick Campbell
- (Ireland) Edwin Edogbo

Players out

== Coaches and staff ==
Senior squad

Position	Name	Nationality
Head coach	Johann van Graan	South Africa
Senior coach	Stephen Larkham	Australia
Defence coach	JP Ferreira	South Africa
Forwards coach	Graham Rowntree	England
Team manager	Niall O'Donovan	Ireland
Head of athletic performance	Ged McNamara	Ireland
Strength and conditioning coach	Adam Sheehan	Ireland
Head of medical	Jamie Kearns	Ireland
Lead physiotherapist	Damien Mordan	Ireland
Physiotherapist	Keith Thornhill	Ireland
Physiotherapist	Ray McGinley	Ireland
Lead performance analyst	George Murray	Ireland
Performance analyst	Paul O'Brien	Ireland

Academy squad

Position	Name
Academy manager	Ian Costello
Elite player development officer	Greig Oliver
Elite player development officer	Andi Kyriacou
Provincial talent coach	Mark Butler
Lead academy athletic development coach	Danielle Cunningham
Academy performance analyst	Elliot Corcoran
Academy physio	Shane Malone
Academy performance nutritionist	Clare Farrell
Mental skills coach	Cathal Sheridan

== Players ==
=== Senior squad ===
Munster Rugby senior squad
**Props**: (Ireland) **Stephen Archer**; (Ireland) James French; (Ireland) **Dave Kilcoyne**; (South Africa) Keynan Knox*; (Ireland) Jeremy Loughman; (Ireland) Liam O'Connor; (Ireland) **John Ryan**; (United States) Roman Salanoa*; (Ireland) Josh Wycherley; **Hookers**: (Ireland) Diarmuid Barron; (Australia) Declan Moore*; (Ireland) Kevin O'Byrne; (Ireland) **Niall Scannell**; **Locks**: (Ireland) Thomas Ahern; (Ireland) **Tadhg Beirne**; (South Africa) **Jason Jenkins**; (Ireland) **Jean Kleyn**; (South Africa) **RG Snyman**; (Ireland) **Fineen Wycherley**	**Back row**: (South Africa) Chris Cloete*; (Ireland) **Gavin Coombes**; (Ireland) Jack Daly; (Ireland) John Hodnett; (Ireland) **Jack O'Donoghue**; (Ireland) **Peter O'Mahony** (c); (Ireland) Jack O'Sullivan; **Scrum-halves**: (Ireland) **Craig Casey**; (Ireland) Neil Cronin; (Ireland) Aran Hehir ^{ST}; (Ireland) **Conor Murray**; (Ireland) Rowan Osborne; **Fly-halves**: (Ireland) **Joey Carbery**; (Ireland) Jack Crowley; (Ireland) Jake Flannery; (Ireland) Ben Healy	**Centres**: (South Africa) **Damian de Allende**; (Ireland) **Chris Farrell**; (Ireland) Dan Goggin; (Ireland) Alex McHenry; (Ireland) **Rory Scannell**; **Back three**: (Ireland) **Andrew Conway**; (Ireland) Liam Coombes; (Ireland) **Shane Daly**; (Ireland) **Keith Earls**; (Ireland) Seán French; (England) Matt Gallagher*; (Ireland) **Mike Haley**; (Ireland) Calvin Nash; (Ireland) **Simon Zebo**
(c) denotes the team captain, **Bold** denotes internationally capped players.^{*} denotes players qualified to play for Ireland on residency or dual nationality.^{ST} denotes a short-term signing.^{L} denotes a player on loan at the club. Players and their allocated positions from the Munster Rugby website.

=== Academy squad ===
Munster Rugby academy squad
**Props**: (Ireland) Mark Donnelly **(1)**; **Hookers**: (Ireland) Scott Buckley **(2)**; **Locks**: (Ireland) Edwin Edogbo **(1)**; (Ireland) Cian Hurley **(2)**; (Ireland) Paddy Kelly **(3)**; (Ireland) Eoin O'Connor **(3)**	**Back row**: (Ireland) Alex Kendellen **(2)**; (Ireland) Daniel Okeke **(1)**; **Scrum-halves**: (Ireland) Ethan Coughlan **(1)**; (Ireland) Paddy Patterson **(3)**; **Fly-halves**: (Ireland) Tony Butler **(1)**	**Centres**: None at present; **Back three**: (Ireland) Patrick Campbell **(1)**; (Ireland) Conor Phillips **(2)**; (Ireland) Jonathan Wren **(3)**
(c) denotes the team captain, **Bold** denotes internationally capped players, number in brackets indicates players stage in the three-year academy cycle.^{*} denotes players qualified to play for Ireland on residency or dual nationality. Players and their allocated positions from the Munster Rugby website.

=== Additional players ===
These 19 players were registered with Munster's Champions Cup squad in December 2021 following the disruption caused by the province's recent tour to South Africa, and are National Talent Squad or Provincial Talent Squad members. They are not contracted to Munster. Three additional academy members - Tony Butler, Patrick Campbell and Edwin Edogbo - were also registered for the squad and are listed in the academy squad above.

Munster Rugby additional players
**Props**: Alessandro Heaney; Darragh McCarthy; Darragh McSweeney; Kieran Ryan; **Hookers**: Dylan Murphy	**Back-row**: John Forde; Nicky Greene; Peter Hyland; Jack Kelleher; Conor Moloney; Fearghail O'Donoghue; Jack O'Sullivan	**Scrum-halves**: Adam Maher; Andrew O'Mahony; **Centres**: Alan Flannery; Darragh French; **Back three**: George Coomber; Jamie Shanahan
Players and their allocated positions from the Munster Rugby website.

== Pre-season ==
4 September 2021
15:00

Munster Greys (Ireland)	38–21	(Ireland) Munster Reds
	Report

Thomond Park (Note: Munster were originally scheduled to host Bath in a pre-season friendly, but Bath were unable to travel due to COVID-19 cases amongst their squad. Munster instead arranged a challenge match, fielding two Munster teams made up of senior, academy and All-Ireland League players from the province.)

11 September 2021
15:00

Exeter Chiefs (England)	19–31	(Ireland) Munster
	Report

Sandy Park

== 2021–22 United Rugby Championship ==
**2021–22 United Rugby Championship Table**
	Team	P	W	D	L	PF	PA	PD	TF	TA	Try bonus	Losing bonus	Pts
1	(Ireland) Leinster	18	13	0	5	546	276	+270	73	31	11	4	67
2	(South Africa) Stormers **(CH)**	18	12	2	4	464	311	+153	60	36	7	2	61
3	(Ireland) Ulster	18	12	0	6	412	297	+115	52	34	7	4	59
4	(South Africa) Bulls **(RU)**	18	11	0	7	518	388	+130	67	42	10	4	58
5	(South Africa) Sharks	18	11	1	6	510	365	+145	60	43	9	2	57
6	(Ireland) Munster	18	11	0	7	524	341	+183	66	34	8	4	56
7	(Scotland) Edinburgh	18	10	1	7	421	318	+103	56	37	8	4	54
8	(Scotland) Glasgow Warriors	18	10	0	8	409	376	+33	53	44	7	3	50
9	(Wales) Ospreys	18	10	0	8	422	474	–52	46	62	4	2	46
10	(Wales) Scarlets	18	8	0	10	494	534	–40	65	73	10	3	45
11	(Ireland) Connacht	18	9	0	9	399	502	–103	51	67	4	1	41
12	(South Africa) Lions	18	8	0	10	408	450	–42	48	55	7	2	41
13	(Italy) Benetton	18	6	1	11	425	501	–76	53	67	6	3	35
14	(Wales) Cardiff	18	7	0	11	369	577	–208	41	72	3	1	32
15	(Wales) Dragons	18	2	1	15	305	547	–242	36	71	3	6	19
16	(Italy) Zebre Parma	18	1	0	17	261	630	–369	32	90	2	3	9
If teams are level at any stage, tiebreakers are applied in the following order: 1. number of matches won; 2. number of matches drawn; 3. the difference between points for and points against; 4. the number of tries scored; 5. the most points scored; 6. the difference between tries for and tries against; 7. the fewest red cards received; 8. the fewest yellow cards received.
Green background indicates teams that are playoff places that top their regional pools and earn a place in the 2022–23 European Champions Cup Blue background indicates teams that did not top their regional pool but are in play-off places and earn a place in the 2022–23 European Champions Cup; Pink background indicates teams that did not top their regional pool or earn a place in the 2022–23 European Champions Cup, but are in play-off places. Yellow background indicates teams that top their regional pool and earn a place in the 2022–23 European Champions Cup, but are not in a play-off place Plain background indicates teams that earn a place in the 2022–23 European Challenge Cup. **(q)** : qualified for the play-offs; **(S)** : winner of the Regional Shield and qualified for the 2022–23 European Rugby Champions Cup; **(e)** : qualified for the 2022–23 European Challenge Cup

**2021–22 United Rugby Championship Regional Shield Pools**
**Irish Shield**
	Team	P	W	D	L	PF	PA	PD	TF	TA	TBP	LBP	Pts
1	(Ireland) **Leinster**	18	13	0	5	546	276	+270	73	31	11	4	67
2	(Ireland) Ulster	18	12	0	6	412	297	+115	52	34	7	4	59
3	(Ireland) Munster	18	11	0	7	524	341	+183	66	34	8	4	56
4	(Ireland) Connacht	18	9	0	9	399	502	–103	51	67	4	1	41
**Scottish/Italian Shield**
	Team	P	W	D	L	PF	PA	PD	TF	TA	TBP	LBP	Pts
1	**(Scotland) Edinburgh**	18	10	1	7	421	318	+103	55	37	8	4	54
2	(Scotland) Glasgow Warriors	18	10	0	8	409	376	+33	53	44	7	3	50
3	(Italy) Benetton	18	6	1	11	425	501	–76	53	67	6	3	35
4	(Italy) Zebre Parma	18	1	0	17	261	630	–369	32	90	2	3	9
**South African Shield**
	Team	P	W	D	L	PF	PA	PD	TF	TA	TBP	LBP	Pts
1	**(South Africa) Stormers**	18	12	2	4	464	311	+153	60	36	7	2	61
2	(South Africa) Bulls	18	11	0	7	518	388	+130	67	42	10	4	58
3	(South Africa) Sharks	18	11	1	6	510	365	+145	60	43	9	2	57
4	(South Africa) Lions	18	8	0	10	408	450	–42	48	55	7	2	41
**Welsh Shield**
	Team	P	W	D	L	PF	PA	PD	TF	TA	TBP	LBP	Pts
1	**(Wales) Ospreys**	18	10	0	8	422	474	–52	46	62	4	2	46
2	(Wales) Scarlets	18	8	0	10	494	534	–40	65	73	10	3	45
3	(Wales) Cardiff	18	7	0	11	369	577	–208	41	72	3	1	32
4	(Wales) Dragons	18	2	1	15	305	547	–242	36	71	3	6	19
If teams are level at any stage, tiebreakers are applied in the following order: 1. number of matches won 2. the difference between points for and points against 3. the number of tries scored 4. the most points scored 5. the difference between tries for and tries against 6. the fewest red cards received 7. the fewest yellow cards received
Green background indicates Shield winner teams guaranteed a place in the 2022–23 European Champions Cup; **Bold** : Regional Shield winner.

=== Round 1 ===
25 September 2021
19:35

**(1 BP) Munster (Ireland)**	**42–17**	**(South Africa) Sharks**
Try: Zebo (2) 5' m, 79' m Casey 35' m G. Coombes (2) 40'+3 c, 50' c Cloete 77' c Con: Carbery (2/4) 40'+4, 51'; Healy (1/2) 78'; Pen: Carbery (1/1) 28'; Healy (1/1) 68'	Report; Report	Try: Chamberlain 56' c Penxe 70' c Con: Bosch (2/2) 57', 70'; Pen: Bosch (1/2) 31'

Thomond Park
Attendance: 11,418 (Note: Reduced stadium capacity due to COVID-19 restrictions.)
Referee: Craig Evans (WRU)

=== Round 2 ===
2 October 2021
19:35

**(1 BP) Munster (Ireland)**	**34–18**	**(South Africa) Stormers**
Try: O'Donoghue (2) 40' c, 55' m Kleyn 45' c N. Scannell 50' m Snyman 67' c Con: Carbery (2/4) 40'+1, 46'; Healy (1/1) 68'; Pen: Healy (1/1) 80'	Report; Report	Try: Gelant 8' m Zas 19' c Con: Libbok (1/2) 21'; Pen: Gelant (1/1) 29'; Swiel (1/1) 65'

Thomond Park
Attendance: 10,723
Referee: Andrew Brace (IRFU)

=== Round 3 ===
10 October 2021
14:00

**Scarlets (Wales)**	**13–43**	**(Ireland) Munster (1 BP)**
Try: McNicholl 28' c Con: Costelow (1/1) 29'; Pen: Costelow (2/4) 16', 33'	Report; Report	Try: O'Sullivan 3' c L. Coombes (2) 22' c, 58' c Nash 35' m Loughman 43' c Cloete 61' c Con: Healy (5/6) 4', 24', 44', 59', 63'; Pen: Healy (1/1) 10'

Parc y Scarlets
Attendance: 6,336
Referee: Ben Blain (SRU)

=== Round 4 ===
16 October 2021
19:35

**Munster (Ireland)**	**20–18**	**(Ireland) Connacht (1 BP)**
Try: Cloete 38' c Barron 77' c Con: Carbery (2/2) 39', 79'; Pen: Carbery (2/2) 48', 58'	Report; Report	Try: Boyle 52' c Carty 68' c Con: Carty (1/2) 69'; Pen: Carty (2/2) 2', 9'

Thomond Park
Attendance: 17,198
Referee: Chris Busby (IRFU)

=== Round 5 ===
23 October 2021
19:35

**Ospreys (Wales)**	**18–10**	**(Ireland) Munster**
Pen: Myler (6/6) 1', 31', 35', 45', 63', 71'	Report; Report	Try: Casey 53' c Con: Crowley (1/1) 54'; Pen: Crowley (1/1) 5'

Swansea.com Stadium
Attendance: 5,678
Referee: Hollie Davidson (SRU)

=== Round 6 ===
27 November 2021
17:45

**Bulls (South Africa)**	**P–P**	**(Ireland) Munster**

Loftus Versfeld Stadium

- Fixture postponed due to COVID-19 pandemic-related travel restrictions.

=== Round 7 ===
4 December 2021
15:30

**Lions (South Africa)**	**P–P**	**(Ireland) Munster**

Emirates Airline Park

- Fixture postponed due to COVID-19 pandemic-related travel restrictions.

=== Round 8 ===
26 December 2021
19:35

**Munster (Ireland)**	**P–P**	**(Ireland) Leinster**

Thomond Park

- Fixture postponed due to COVID-19 cases amongst the Leinster squad.

=== Round 9 ===
1 January 2022
17:15

**Connacht (Ireland)**	**10–8**	**(Ireland) Munster (1 BP)**
Try: Aki 57' c Con: Fitzgerald (1/1) 58'; Pen: Carty (1/1) 14'	Report; Report	Try: Conway 22' m Pen: Healy (1/2) 17'

The Sportsground
Attendance: 3,064
Referee: Chris Busby (IRFU)

=== Round 10 ===
8 January 2022
19:35

**Munster (Ireland)**	**18–13**	**(Ireland) Ulster (1 BP)**
Try: Haley 60' m Kendellen 75' c Con: Healy (1/1) 76'; Pen: Crowley (2/2) 32', 39'	Report; Report	Try: Herring 7' c Con: Cooney (1/1) 9'; Pen: Doak (2/3) 40'+2, 56'

Thomond Park
Attendance: 5,000
Referee: Mike Adamson (SRU)

=== Round 11 ===
29 January 2022
17:00

**Zebre Parma (Italy)**	**17–34**	**(Ireland) Munster (1 BP)**
Try: Cronjé 39' c Laloifi 80'+1; Con: O'Malley (1/1) 40'; Rizzi (1/1) 80'+2; Pen: O'Malley (1/2) 44'	Report; Report	Try: O'Donoghue 21' m Goggin 28' c F. Wycherley 36' c J. Wycherley 66' c Barron 71' m Con: Flannery (3/3) 29', 37', 66'; Pen: Crowley (1/1) 18'

Stadio Sergio Lanfranchi
Attendance: 1,000
Referee: Craig Evans (WRU)

=== Rescheduled round 18 ===
11 February 2022
20:15

**Glasgow Warriors (Scotland)**	**13–11**	**(Ireland) Munster (1 BP)**
Try: Cummings 38' c Con: Weir (1/1) 40'; Pen: Weir (2/3) 15', 60'	Report; Report	Try: Kleyn 71' m Pen: Healy (2/3) 37', 63'

Scotstoun Stadium
Attendance: 6,238
Referee: Gianluca Gnecchi (FIR)

=== Round 12 ===
18 February 2022
19:35

**(1 BP) Munster (Ireland)**	**34–20**	**(Scotland) Edinburgh**
Try: F. Wycherley 10' c Zebo (3) 40'+1 c, 57' c, 76' c Con: Healy (4/4) 11', 40'+3, 58', 78'; Pen: Healy (2/2) 5', 17'	Report; Report	Try: Moyano 23' c Pyrgos 69' c Con: Boffelli (2/2) 24', 70'; Pen: Boffelli (2/2) 38', 49'

Thomond Park
Attendance: 11,791
Referee: Ben Whitehouse (WRU)

=== Round 13 ===
5 March 2022
17:15

**(1 BP) Munster (Ireland)**	**64–3**	**(Wales) Dragons**
Try: Casey (2) 9' c, 22' c O'Donoghue (2) 24' c, 74' c Cloete (2) 36' c, 63' m Zebo 52' m Farrell 54' c S. Daly 57' m Hodnett 72' c Con: Crowley (5/7) 11', 23', 25', 37', 55'; Healy (2/3) 73', 75'	Report; Report	Pen: S. Davies (1/1) 16'

Thomond Park
Attendance: 11,853
Referee: Sam Grove-White (SRU)

=== Rescheduled round 6 ===
12 March 2022
14:05

**Bulls (South Africa)**	**29–24**	**(Ireland) Munster (1 BP)**
Try: Tambwe 15' c Wa. Steenkamp 32' c Con: C. Smith (2/2) 16', 33'; Pen: C. Smith (5/5) 2', 8', 21', 29', 46'	Report; Report	Try: Kendellen 53' c De Allende 64' c O'Donoghue 72' c Con: Healy (3/3) 54', 65', 74'; Pen: Healy (1/1) 5'

Loftus Versfeld Stadium
Attendance: 2,000
Referee: Ben Whitehouse (WRU)

=== Rescheduled round 7 ===
19 March 2022
12:00

**Lions (South Africa)**	**23–21**	**(Ireland) Munster (1 BP)**
Try: Van der Merwe 31' c Simelane 66' c Con: Hendrikse (2/2) 32', 67'; Pen: Hendrikse (3/3) 35', 65', 73'	Report; Report	Try: Ryan 7' c J. Wycherley 13' c F. Wycherley 40'+1; Con: Crowley (3/3) 8', 14', 40'+2

Emirates Airline Park
Attendance: 2,000
Referee: Adam Jones (WRU)

=== Round 14 ===
25 March 2022
19:35

**(1 BP) Munster (Ireland)**	**51–22**	**(Italy) Benetton**
Try: Gallagher 18' c Casey 33' c Zebo 45' c G. Coombes 65' c O'Sullivan 69' c De Allende 77' c Con: Healy (6/6) 20', 35', 47', 66', 70', 78'; Pen: Healy (3/3) 7', 41', 58'	Report; Report	Try: R. Smith 40' c Da Re 54' m Braley 80'+2 c Con: R. Smith (1/2) 40'+2; Coetzee (1/1) 80'+4; Pen: R. Smith (1/1) 23'

Musgrave Park
Attendance: 6,136
Referee: Craig Evans (WRU)

=== Rescheduled round 8 ===
2 April 2022
19:00

**Munster (Ireland)**	**19–34**	**(Ireland) Leinster (1 BP)**
Try: De Allende 62' c Con: Carbery (1/1) 63'; Pen: Carbery (4/4) 12', 20', 27', 36'	Report; Report	Try: Ringrose 15' m Lowe (2) 47' m, 73' m J. O'Brien 57' c Con: R. Byrne (1/4) 59'; Pen: R. Byrne (4/4) 9', 25', 40'+2, 54'

Thomond Park
Attendance: 20,657
Referee: Christophe Ridley (RFU)

=== Round 16 ===
22 April 2022
19:35

**(1 BP) Ulster (Ireland)**	**17–24**	**(Ireland) Munster**
Try: Herring 47' c Reidy 74' c Con: Cooney (1/1) 48'; Doak (1/1) 75'; Pen: Cooney (1/1) 7'	Report; Report	Try: Archer 21' c Earls 27' m Con: Carbery (1/2) 22'; Pen: Carbery (4/4) 11', 43', 59', 79'

Kingspan Stadium
Attendance: 12,131
Referee: Jaco Peyper (SARU)

=== Round 17 ===
29 April 2022
19:35

**(1 BP) Munster (Ireland)**	**42–21**	**(Wales) Cardiff**
Try: Haley (2) 5' c, 25' c Ahern 39' c Casey (2) 62' c, 76' m Con: Healy (3/3) 7', 26', 40'+1; Carbery (1/2) 63'; Pen: Healy (3/3) 18', 32', 60'	Report; Report	Try: Davies 1' c Lee-Lo 11' c L. Williams 55' c Con: Evans (3/3) 3', 13', 56'

Musgrave Park
Attendance: 7,325
Referee: Sam Grove-White (SRU)

=== Rescheduled round 15 ===
21 May 2022
19:15

**(1 BP) Leinster (Ireland)**	**35–25**	**(Ireland) Munster**
Try: Penny 1' m Foley 22' c Penalty try 50' c O'Loughlin 53' c Con: H. Byrne (2/3) 22', 54'; Pen: H. Byrne (3/3) 8', 45', 70'	Report; Report	Try: O'Donoghue 11' m Haley 16' c Murray 40' c Con: Carbery (2/3) 16', 41'; Pen: Carbery (2/2) 48', 60'

Aviva Stadium
Attendance: 32,411
Referee: Frank Murphy (IRFU)

=== Quarter-final ===
3 June 2022
19:35

**Ulster (Ireland)**	**36–17**	**(Ireland) Munster**
Try: Cooney 9' c S. Moore (2) 24' c, 32' m Timoney 42' c Hume 60' c Con: Cooney (3/4) 10', 25', 43'; Doak (1/1) 61'; Pen: Cooney (1/1) 56'	Report; Report	Try: Kleyn 18' c Earls (2) 52' m, 69' m Con: Carbery (1/3) 18'

Kingspan Stadium
Attendance: 10,252
Referee: Jaco Peyper (SARU)

== 2021–22 European Rugby Champions Cup ==
Munster were ranked second out of the eight United Rugby Championship teams that qualified for the 2021–22 Champions Cup, owing to their runners-up position after defeat against Leinster in the 2021 Pro14 Grand Final, and were seeded in tier one for the pool stage draw. The province was drawn in pool B for the 2021–22 European Rugby Champions Cup pool stage, and faced French club Castres and English club Wasps.

Pool B Standings
Team	P	W	D	L	PF	PA	Diff	TF	TA	TB	LB	Pts
(England) Leicester Tigers	4	4	0	0	102	64	+38	14	7	3	0	19
(England) Harlequins	4	4	0	0	135	101	+34	18	15	3	0	19
(Ireland) Munster	4	4	0	0	115	47	+68	12	5	2	0	18
(England) Bristol Bears	4	3	1	0	108	38	+70	16	4	3	0	17
(Ireland) Connacht	4	1	0	3	118	104	+14	16	14	3	3	10
(France) Bordeaux	4	1	1	2	58	54	+4	8	7	1	1	8
(France) Toulouse	4	1	1	2	61	65	–4	8	8	1	0	7
(France) Stade Français	4	1	1	2	63	95	–32	7	14	1	0	7
(Wales) Cardiff	4	1	0	3	85	118	–33	13	16	2	1	7
(England) Wasps	4	1	1	2	51	102	–51	6	13	0	0	6
(France) Castres	4	0	0	4	77	91	–14	9	9	1	4	5
(Wales) Scarlets	4	0	1	3	31	125	–94	4	19	0	0	2

Key to colours
Top 8 of each pool, advance to last 16.
Teams 9–12 in pool advance to 2021–22 European Rugby Challenge Cup last 16.

=== Round 1 ===
12 December 2021
15:15

Wasps (England)	14–35	(Ireland) Munster (1 BP)
Try: Barbeary 30' c Le Bourgeois 63' c Con: Gopperth (2/2) 31', 64'	Report; Report	Try: Earls 34' c Campbell 42' m Conway 47' c Buckley 56' c Con: Carbery (3/4) 35', 48', 56'; Pen: Carbery (3/4) 6', 27', 66'

Coventry Building Society Arena
Attendance: 6,716
Referee: Romain Poite (FFR)

=== Round 2 ===
18 December 2021
20:00

Munster (Ireland)	19–13	(France) Castres (1 BP)
Try: O'Donoghue 57' c Con: Healy (1/1) 58'; Pen: Healy (4/5) 7', 28', 34', 69'	Report; Report	Try: Kornath 76' c Con: Urdapilleta (1/1) 77'; Pen: Urdapilleta (2/2) 39', 62'

Thomond Park
Attendance: 21,250
Referee: Matthew Carley (RFU)

=== Round 3 ===
14 January 2022
20:00

(1 BP) Castres (France)	13–16	(Ireland) Munster
Try: Larregain 27' c Con: Botica (1/1) 28'; Pen: Botica (2/2) 54', 66'	Report; Report	Try: G. Coombes 77' c Con: Crowley (1/1) 79'; Pen: Crowley (3/3) 10', 46', 49'

Stade Pierre-Fabre
Attendance: 5,000
Referee: Luke Pearce (RFU)

=== Round 4 ===
23 January 2022
15:15

(1 BP) Munster (Ireland)	45–7	(England) Wasps
Try: Murray 8' c Zebo (2) 17' c, 78' c O'Donoghue 29' c Loughman 43' c R. Scannell 80'+2 c Con: Healy (4/4) 9', 18', 30', 44'; Crowley (2/2) 80', 80'+3; Pen: Healy (1/1) 15'	Report; Report	Try: Robson 26' c Con: Atkinson (1/1) 26'

Thomond Park
Attendance: 13,047 (Note: Reduced attendance due to COVID-19 restrictions being lifted only 24 hours before the fixture.)
Referee: Tual Trainini (FFR)

=== Round of 16 (1st leg) ===
9 April 2022
17:30

Exeter Chiefs (England)	13–8	(Ireland) Munster
Try: Hogg 5' m Vermeulen 37' m Drop: Hogg (1/1) 65'	Report; Report	Try: S. Daly 66' m Pen: Healy (1/1) 56'

Sandy Park
Attendance: 10,307
Referee: Pierre Brousset (FFR)

=== Round of 16 (2nd leg) ===
16 April 2022
15:00

Munster (Ireland)	26–10	(England) Exeter Chiefs
Try: Carbery 25' c De Allende 72' c Con: Carbery (2/2) 26', 72'; Pen: Carbery (4/4) 5', 16', 59', 64'	Report; Report	Try: S. Maunder 10' m Vermeulen 48' m

Thomond Park
Attendance: 21,125
Referee: Mathieu Raynal (FFR)

- Munster won 34–23 on aggregate.

=== Quarter-final ===
7 May 2022
15:00

Munster (Ireland)	24–24 (a.e.t.)	(France) Toulouse
Try: Kendellen 9' c Earls 38' c Haley 43' c Con: Carbery (3/3) 9', 39', 44'; Pen: Carbery (1/3) 56'	Report; Report	Try: Ntamack 11' c Lebel (2) 25' c, 66' c Con: Ramos (3/3) 12', 26', 66'; Pen: Ramos (1/1) 75'
	Penalties
Murray; Healy; Carbery; Murray; Healy	2–4	Dupont; Ramos; Ntamack; Dupont

Aviva Stadium
Attendance: 40,476
Referee: Luke Pearce (RFU)

== Player statistics ==
Player statistics from the 2021–22 season. Stats from the league and European competitions only are shown. Academy players in italics. † indicates additional players used who are not contracted. Updated 4 June 2022 after URC quarter-final

Pos	Player	Apps	Starts	Sub	Mins	Tries	Cons	Pens	Drops	Points	Yel	Red
PR	Stephen Archer	18	14	4	859	1	0	0	0	5	0	0
PR	Mark Donnelly	3	0	3	40	0	0	0	0	0	0	0
PR	James French	1	1	0	55	0	0	0	0	0	0	0
PR	Dave Kilcoyne	9	9	0	510	0	0	0	0	0	0	0
PR	Keynan Knox	10	2	8	323	0	0	0	0	0	0	0
PR	Jeremy Loughman	21	9	12	857	2	0	0	0	10	0	0
PR	Liam O'Connor	0	0	0	0	0	0	0	0	0	0	0
PR	John Ryan	21	9	12	813	1	0	0	0	5	0	0
PR	Roman Salanoa	2	0	2	50	0	0	0	0	0	0	0
PR	Josh Wycherley	19	8	11	693	2	0	0	0	10	0	0
HK	Diarmuid Barron	22	9	13	931	2	0	0	0	10	0	0
HK	Scott Buckley	7	1	6	186	1	0	0	0	5	0	0
HK	Declan Moore	1	0	1	10	0	0	0	0	0	0	0
HK	Kevin O'Byrne	3	0	3	52	0	0	0	0	0	0	0
HK	Niall Scannell	18	16	2	952	1	0	0	0	5	1	0
LK	Thomas Ahern	13	4	9	458	1	0	0	0	5	0	0
LK	Tadhg Beirne	7	7	0	560	0	0	0	0	0	0	0
LK	Edwin Edogbo	0	0	0	0	0	0	0	0	0	0	0
LK	Cian Hurley	0	0	0	0	0	0	0	0	0	0	0
LK	Jason Jenkins	10	2	8	277	0	0	0	0	0	0	0
LK	Paddy Kelly	0	0	0	0	0	0	0	0	0	0	0
LK	Jean Kleyn	21	20	1	1,234	3	0	0	0	15	0	0
LK	Eoin O'Connor	3	1	2	110	0	0	0	0	0	0	0
LK	RG Snyman	3	0	3	46	1	0	0	0	5	0	0
LK	Fineen Wycherley	23	20	3	1,569	3	0	0	0	15	0	0
BR	Chris Cloete	11	7	4	501	5	0	0	0	25	0	0
BR	Gavin Coombes	14	13	1	952	4	0	0	0	20	1	0
BR	Jack Daly	5	0	5	102	0	0	0	0	0	0	0
BR	John Forde†	1	0	1	10	0	0	0	0	0	0	0
BR	John Hodnett	16	9	7	748	1	0	0	0	5	0	0
BR	Alex Kendellen	20	10	10	885	3	0	0	0	15	1	0
BR	Conor Moloney†	1	0	1	10	0	0	0	0	0	0	0
BR	Jack O'Donoghue	23	21	2	1,638	9	0	0	0	45	0	0
BR	Daniel Okeke	1	1	0	80	0	0	0	0	0	0	0
BR	Peter O'Mahony	13	13	0	1,006	0	0	0	0	0	0	0
BR	Jack O'Sullivan	6	2	4	240	2	0	0	0	10	1	0
SH	Craig Casey	19	10	9	902	7	0	0	0	35	0	0
SH	Ethan Coughlan	2	0	2	11	0	0	0	0	0	0	0
SH	Neil Cronin	10	5	5	378	0	0	0	0	0	0	0
SH	Aran Hehir	0	0	0	0	0	0	0	0	0	0	0
SH	Conor Murray	13	11	2	722	2	0	0	0	10	1	0
SH	Rowan Osborne	2	0	2	17	0	0	0	0	0	0	0
SH	Paddy Patterson	5	0	5	76	0	0	0	0	0	0	0
FH	Tony Butler	1	0	1	8	0	0	0	0	0	0	0
FH	Joey Carbery	11	10	1	797	1	21	21	0	110	0	0
FH	Jack Crowley	12	5	7	457	0	12	7	0	45	0	0
FH	Jake Flannery	2	1	1	68	0	3	0	0	6	0	0
FH	Ben Healy	20	10	10	926	0	30	21	0	123	1	0
CE	Damian de Allende	13	11	2	950	4	0	0	0	20	0	0
CE	Chris Farrell	21	19	2	1,553	1	0	0	0	5	1	0
CE	Dan Goggin	8	7	1	523	1	0	0	0	5	0	0
CE	Alex McHenry	0	0	0	0	0	0	0	0	0	0	0
CE	Rory Scannell	12	10	2	784	1	0	0	0	5	0	0
B3	Patrick Campbell	2	2	0	152	1	0	0	0	5	0	0
B3	Andrew Conway	10	10	0	747	2	0	0	0	10	0	0
B3	Liam Coombes	4	3	1	250	2	0	0	0	10	0	0
B3	Shane Daly	16	12	4	1,004	2	0	0	0	10	1	0
B3	Keith Earls	12	11	1	868	5	0	0	0	25	0	0
B3	Seán French	1	1	0	51	0	0	0	0	0	0	0
B3	Matt Gallagher	5	5	0	358	1	0	0	0	5	0	0
B3	Mike Haley	19	19	0	1,477	5	0	0	0	25	0	0
B3	Calvin Nash	8	8	0	623	1	0	0	0	5	0	0
B3	Conor Phillips	0	0	0	0	0	0	0	0	0	0	0
B3	Jonathan Wren	1	0	1	8	0	0	0	0	0	0	0
B3	Simon Zebo	13	12	1	885	9	0	0	0	45	0	1
