= Jason Jenkins =

South African rugby union player

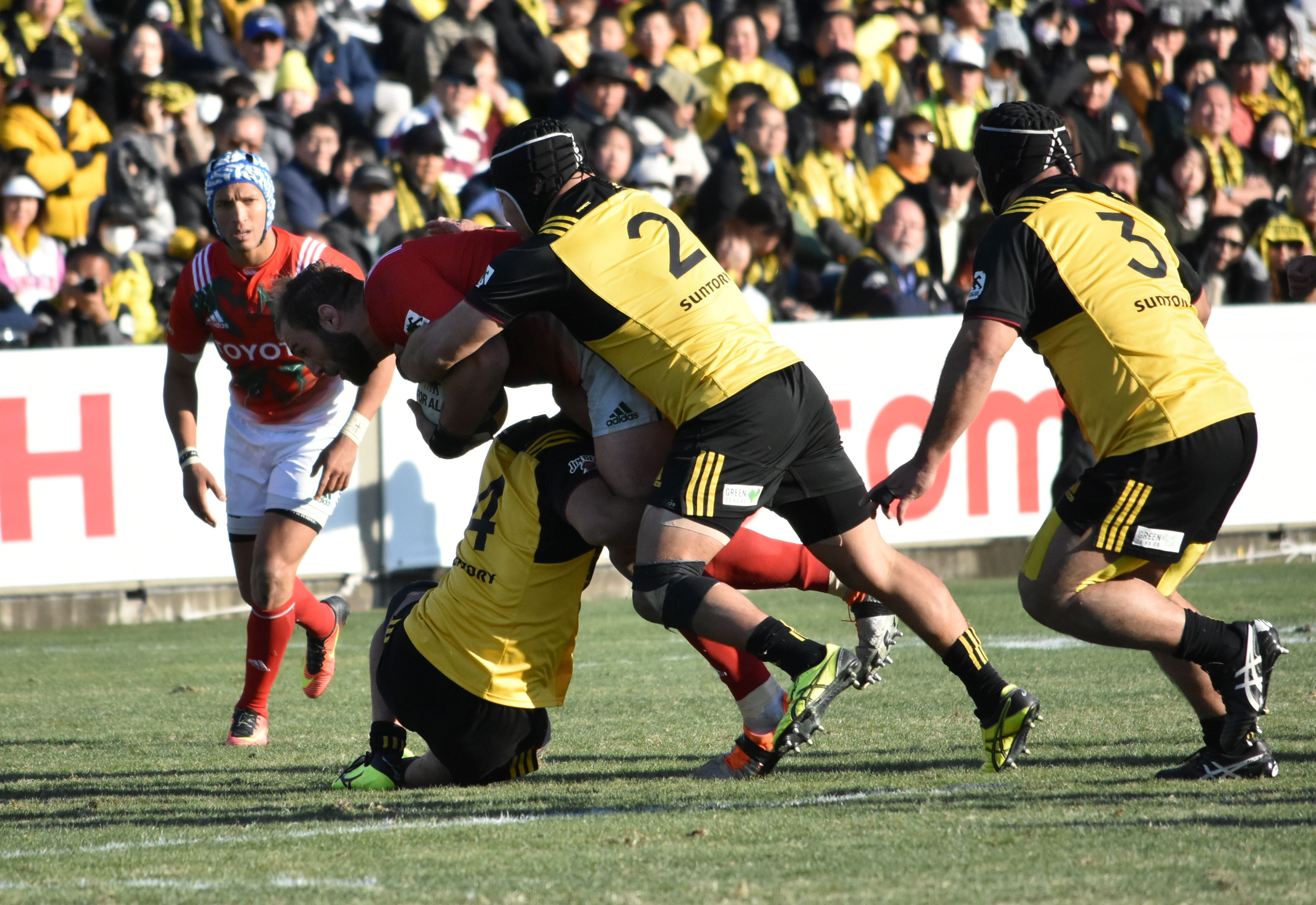
- Jenkins playing for Toyota Verblitz in 2019
- Full name: Jason Howell Jenkins
- Born: 2 December 1995 (age 30) Pretoria, Gauteng, South Africa
- Height: 2.03 m (6 ft 8 in)
- Weight: 124 kg (19.5 st; 273 lb)
- School: St. Alban's College
- University: University of Pretoria

Rugby union career
- Position: Lock
Youth career
- 2014–2015: Blue Bulls
Amateur team(s)
Years	Team	Apps	(Points)
2015	UP Tuks	1	(0)
Senior career
Years	Team	Apps	(Points)
2015–2016	Blue Bulls	8	(10)
2016–2020	Bulls	57	(40)
2017–2021	Toyota Verblitz	29	(45)
2018	Blue Bulls XV	1	(5)
2021–2022	Munster	10	(0)
2022–2024	Leinster	39	(35)
2024	Sharks	0	(0)
- Correct as of 23 September 2024
International career
Years	Team	Apps	(Points)
2015	South Africa Under-20	5	(15)
2016–2017	South Africa 'A'	3	(0)
2018–	South Africa	1	(0)
- Correct as of 3 June 2018

Jason Howell Jenkins (born 2 December 1995) is a South African rugby union player for United Rugby Championship and Champions Cup side Sharks. His regular position is lock, though he can also play in the back-row.

== Career ==
=== 2014 ===
After completing high school at St. Alban's College in Pretoria, Jenkins joined the Blue Bulls Academy. He established himself in the Blue Bulls U19 squad that participated in the 2014 Under-21 Provincial Championship, appearing in all fourteen of their matches in the competition and starting thirteen of those. He scored tries in their matches against the Sharks U19s and the Western Province U19s to help the Blue Bulls finish top of the log to qualify for the semi-finals. He helped the Blue Bulls to a 43–20 victory in their semi-final match against the Sharks U19s and he also started the final, where the Blue Bulls lost 26–33 to Western Province.

=== 2015 ===
In 2015, Jenkins was named in the UP Tuks squad for the 2015 Varsity Cup competition. He make one appearance, playing off the bench in a 63–8 victory over the CUT Ixias.

Jenkins was named in a 37-man South Africa Under-20 training squad and appeared for them as a replacement in a 31–24 victory in a friendly match against a Varsity Cup Dream Team that was named at the conclusion of the 2015 Varsity Cup competition. He was then named in their squad to tour Argentina for a two-match series as preparation for the 2015 World Rugby Under 20 Championship. He started their 25–22 victory over Argentina in the first match, as well as 39–28 win in the second match four days later.

Upon the team's return, he was named in the final squad for the 2015 World Rugby Under 20 Championship. He played in all three of their matches in Pool B of the competition; he played off the bench in a 33–5 win against hosts Italy, before starting both their 40–8 win against Samoa and their 46–13 win over Australia. Jenkins also scored a try in each of the two matches that he started to help South Africa finish top of Pool B to qualify for the semi-finals with the best record pool stage of all the teams in the competition. He started their semi-final match against England, but could not prevent them losing 20–28 to be eliminated from the competition by England for the second year in succession. He started their third-place play-off match against France, scoring his third try of the competition to help South Africa to a 31–18 win to win the bronze medal.

He then played for the Blue Bulls U21s in the 2015 Under-21 Provincial Championship Group A, but was also named in the senior squad for the 2015 Currie Cup Premier Division.

=== South Africa 'A' and Springboks ===
In 2016, Jenkins was included in a South Africa 'A' squad that played a two-match series against a touring England Saxons team. He didn't play in their first match in Bloemfontein, but started the second match of the series, a 26–29 defeat in George.

He made his Test debut for the senior Springboks on 2 June 2018 against Wales in Washington, D.C. at the age of 22 years.

=== Toyota Verblitz ===
He joined Japanese Top League side Toyota Verblitz for the 2017–18 season.

=== Munster ===
Jenkins joined Irish United Rugby Championship and Champions Cup side Munster on a one-year contract for the 2021–22 season, joining his former Bulls teammate RG Snyman at the club. He made his senior competitive debut for the province in their 2021–22 Champions Cup round 2 fixture at home to French side Castres on 18 December 2021, coming on as a replacement for Jean Kleyn in Munster's 19–13 victory. Jenkins endured a difficult start to his time with Munster, as shoulder, thigh and abdominal injuries restricted him to just one appearance for the province by the start of 2022. Jenkins returned from the run of injured to make his United Rugby Championship debut for the province in their 51–22 home win against Italian side Benetton in round 14 on 25 March 2022, coming on as a 63rd minute replacement for Alex Kendellen.

=== Leinster ===
Jenkins joined Leinster from the 2022–23 season. He played 39 matches in the URC and the Champions Cup in his two seasons at the club.

=== Sharks ===
Jenkins returned to South Africa for the 2024 URC season, joining the Sharks.
