= Edwin Edogbo =

Irish rugby union player

- Born: 21 December 2002 (age 23) Cobh, County Cork, Ireland
- Height: 1.96 m (6 ft 5 in)
- Weight: 132 kg (20.8 st; 291 lb)
- School: Coláiste Muire
- University: University College Cork

Rugby union career
- Position: Lock
Amateur team(s)
| Years | Team | Apps | (Points) |
- Cobh Pirates RFC
| 2021– | UCC | | |
Senior career
| Years | Team | Apps | (Points) |
| 2022– | Munster | 31 | (30) |
- Correct as of 31 October 2026
International career
| Years | Team | Apps | (Points) |
| 2026– | Ireland | 1 | (0) |
- Correct as of 14 February 2026

Edwin Edogbo (born 21 December 2002) is an Irish rugby union player who plays as a lock for United Rugby Championship club Munster. His younger brother Sean Edogbo also plays for Munster and has represented Ireland at under 20 level and on the Emerging Ireland team.

== Early life ==
Edogbo was born in Cork, to parents from Nigeria.

== Club career ==
Edogbo was selected for the Munster under-18s Clubs team in 2019 after helping east Cork club Cobh Pirates reach the Munster under-18s final. He also represented the Ireland under-18s Clubs and under-18s Schools sides. He began studying engineering at University College Cork in 2021 and played for UCC in the early rounds of the 2021–22 All-Ireland League. Edogbo joined Munster's academy in November 2021, becoming the first player from Cobh Pirates to do so.

Despite being injured, Edogbo was registered with Munster's Champions Cup squad in December 2021 following the disruption caused by the province's tour to South Africa the previous month. After impressing during pre-season, Edogbo made his senior competitive debut for Munster in round two of the 2022–23 against Welsh side Dragons on 25 September 2022, coming on as a replacement for Fineen Wycherley in the 57th minute in the province's 23–17 away defeat. He then made his first start for the province in their 31–17 home win against South African side the Bulls in round five of the URC on 15 October 2022.

Edogbo started in Munster's historic 28–14 win against a South Africa XV at Páirc Uí Chaoimh on 10 November 2022. In January 2023, he signed a three-year contract with Munster, remaining in the academy for the 2023–24 season and joining the senior squad on a two-year contract from the 2024–25 season.

== International career ==
Ahead of the 2025 Autumn Nations Series, Edogbo was called up as a training panellist with the Ireland senior squad but was later ruled out of the campaign after a concussion.

He was one of two uncapped players named for Ireland ahead of the 2026 Six Nations campaign. In February 2026, he was named on the bench and came on to make his debut in the second round during a 20–13 victory against Italy.

== Rugby honours ==
=== Munster ===
- United Rugby Championship
  - Winner (1): 2022–23
