= Mark Donnelly (rugby union) =

Irish rugby union player

- Born: 14 March 2001 (age 25) Cork, Ireland
- Height: 1.80 m (5 ft 11 in)
- Weight: 110 kg (17 st; 240 lb)
- School: Christian Brothers College

Rugby union career
- Position: Prop
Amateur team(s)
Years	Team	Apps	(Points)
- Garryowen
Senior career
Years	Team	Apps	(Points)
2021–	Munster	16	(0)
- Correct as of 30 January 2026
International career
Years	Team	Apps	(Points)
2020–2021	Ireland U20	3	(0)
- Correct as of 1 July 2021

Mark Donnelly (born 14 March 2001) is an Irish rugby union player who plays as a prop for United Rugby Championship club Munster.

== Early life ==
Donnelly played rugby for Midleton and Midleton College before moving to Christian Brothers College, Cork, where he won a Munster Schools Rugby Senior Cup in 2019 before joining Limerick club Garryowen.

== Munster ==
Having previously represented the province at under-18 level, as well as playing for Munster's 7s team in the IRFU's inaugural HPC Sevens Series and for the 'A' team in fixtures against Leinster A and Ulster A, Donnelly joined the Munster academy ahead of the 2021–22 season. Following the disruption caused by the province's recent tour to South Africa, Donnelly made his senior competitive debut for Munster in their opening 2021–22 Champions Cup fixture away to English club Wasps on 12 December 2021, coming on as a replacement for Dave Kilcoyne in the province's 35–14 win. Donnelly made his league debut for Munster as a replacement for Josh Wycherley in the province's 29–24 away defeat against South African side the Bulls in a rescheduled round 6 fixture during the 2021–22 United Rugby Championship on 12 March 2022.

== Ireland ==
Donnelly represented Ireland at under-18 level and was selected in the under-20s squad for the 2020 Six Nations Under 20s Championship, but did not make any appearances in the tournament before it was cancelled due to the COVID-19 pandemic. However, Donnelly earned selection at under-20 level for a second time, this time for the 2021 Six Nations Under 20s Championship, featuring off the bench in the 38–7 win against Scotland, the 40–12 win against Wales and the 24–15 defeat against England.

== Honours ==
=== Munster ===
- United Rugby Championship
  - Winner (1): 2022–23
