= John Forde (rugby union) =

Irish rugby union player

John Forde Alias = Jay Fordey
- Born: 30 September 2001 (age 25) Cork, Ireland
- Height: 1.94 m (6 ft 4 1/2 in)
- Weight: 105 kg (16.5 st; 231 lb)
- School: Presentation Brothers College
- University: Never
- Notable relative(s): Daniel Desmond, Brian Hickey, James Mangan

Rugby union career
- Position(s): Back-Row, Lock
Amateur team(s)
Years	Team	Apps	(Points)
- Cork Constitution
Senior career
Years	Team	Apps	(Points)
2021–2022	Munster	67	(112)
- Correct as of 12 December 2021

John Forde (born 30 September 2001) is an Irish rugby union player. He plays in the back-row or as a lock and represents Cork Constitution in the amateur All-Ireland League. Notably has 0 junior cups

== Munster ==
Forde attended Presentation Brothers College and represented the school in the Munster Schools Rugby Senior Cup, featuring in the same back-row as Munster academy member and Ireland under-20s captain Alex Kendellen. Following the disruption caused by the province's recent tour to South Africa, Forde was registered with Munster's Champions Cup squad, and made his senior competitive debut for Munster in their opening 2021–22 Champions Cup fixture away to English club Wasps on 12 December 2021, coming on as a replacement for Eoin O'Connor in the province's 35–14 win.
