= John Forde =

John Forde may refer to:

- John Forde (Gaelic footballer)
- John Forde (rugby union)

== See also ==
- John Ford (disambiguation)
