= Jack O'Donoghue =

Irish rugby union player

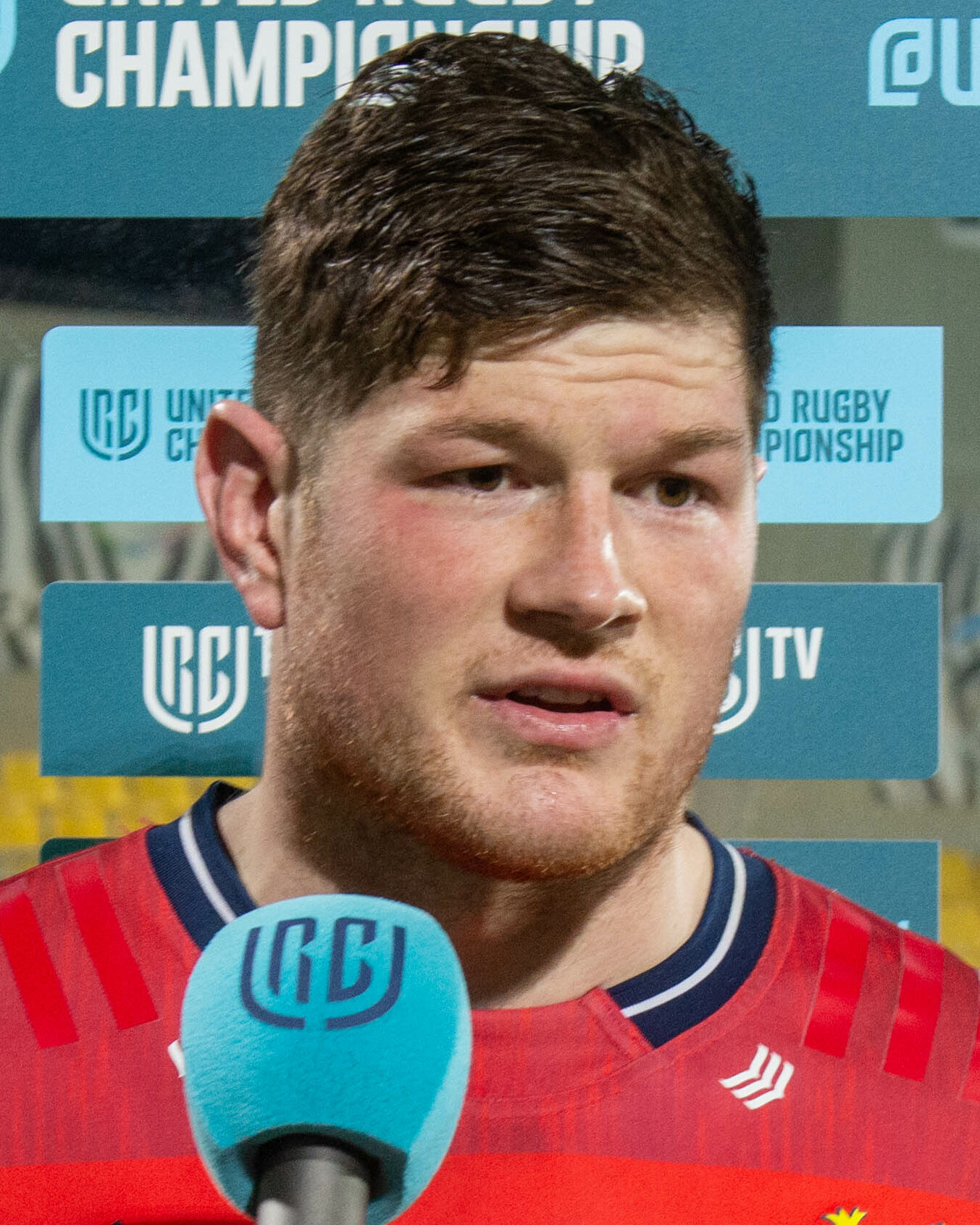
- O'Donoghue in 2022
- Born: 8 February 1994 (age 32) Waterford, Ireland
- Height: 1.91 m (6 ft 3 in)
- Weight: 109 kg (17.2 st; 240 lb)
- School: De La Salle College

Rugby union career
- Position(s): Number 8, Flanker
Amateur team(s)
Years	Team	Apps	(Points)
- Waterpark
- UL Bohemians
Senior career
Years	Team	Apps	(Points)
2014–	Munster	244	(160)
- Correct as of 31 October 2026
International career
Years	Team	Apps	(Points)
2013–2014	Ireland U20	9	(10)
2016–2017	Ireland	2	(0)
- Correct as of 17 June 2017

Jack O'Donoghue (born 8 February 1994) is an Irish rugby union player who plays as a flanker or number eight for United Rugby Championship club Munster.

== Early career ==
Born in Waterford, O'Donoghue captained Waterpark to a Munster Under-17 title in 2011, a second title at that grade, having also won the All-Ireland title the previous year. He played for the Munster Under-18 Clubs team in the 2010–11 and 2011–12 seasons, captaining the side in the latter season. O'Donoghue also captained the Ireland Under-18 Clubs team in their games against France and England in April 2012.

== Munster ==
O'Donoghue made his debut for Munster on 19 September 2014, coming on as a replacement against Zebre in the United Rugby Championship. He signed a three-year contract with Munster in January 2015. O'Donoghue made his first start for Munster against Cardiff Blues on 14 February 2015, also scoring his first try for Munster in the 33–16 win. He scored a try in the 25–25 draw with Scarlets on 21 February 2015. O'Donoghue also scored a try in the 22–10 win against Glasgow Warriors on 28 February 2015. He won the 2015 John McCarthy Award for Academy Player of the Year Award in April 2015. O'Donoghue came off the bench during the 2015 Pro12 Grand Final on 30 May 2015.

O'Donoghue started at openside flanker for Munster against Benetton on 5 September 2015. He made his European Rugby Champions Cup debut on 14 November 2015, starting the opening 2015–16 pool game against Benetton. On 16 March 2017, it was announced that O'Donoghue had signed a two-year contract extension with Munster. O'Donoghue captained Munster for the first time on 17 February 2018, doing so in the 2017–18 Pro14 fixture against Cardiff Blues and becoming the first Waterford player to captain the province in the professional era.

A knee ligament injury O'Donoghue sustained in Munster's Pro14 semi-final against Leinster in May 2018 required surgery. He signed a two-year contract extension with Munster in December 2018. O'Donoghue returned from injury in Munster's 19–13 away win against Ospreys in round 16 of the 2018–19 Pro14 on 22 February 2019, and won his 100th cap for the province in their 24–9 defeat against Leinster on 18 May 2019. He captained Munster and won the Man-of-the-Match award in the provinces 18–16 defeat against Edinburgh in round 7 of the 2019–20 Pro14 on 29 November 2019.

O'Donoghue signed a two-year contract extension with the province in February 2021. O'Donoghue earned his 150th cap for Munster in their 2021–22 Champions Cup round 4 fixture at home to Wasps on 23 January 2022, becoming the youngest Munster player to reach the milestone aged 27, and scoring a try and earning the player of the match award in the province's 45–7 win. O'Donoghue was long-listed for the 2022 EPCR European Player of the Year award when the 15 contenders were announced in February 2022. For his performances during the 2021–22 season, O'Donoghue won Munster's Men's Player of the Year when the province's end-of-season awards were announced in June 2022.

O'Donoghue captained Munster to a historic 28–14 win against a South Africa XV in Páirc Uí Chaoimh on 10 November 2022, and he signed a two-year contract extension with the province in December 2022, a deal that will see O'Donoghue remain with Munster until at least June 2025. O'Donoghue was banned for three weeks after being sent off in Munster's 27–23 win against Northampton Saints on 14 January 2023.

== Ireland ==
O'Donoghue captained Ireland under-20s in their opening game of the 2014 IRB Junior World Championship against France under-20s on 2 June 2014.

On 7 March 2016, O'Donoghue was added to Ireland's squad for the final two rounds of the 2016 Six Nations Championship, his first senior international call-up. On 7 November 2016, O'Donoghue was added to the senior Ireland squad for the 2016 end-of-year rugby union internationals. On 12 November 2016, O'Donoghue made his senior Ireland debut when he started in the 52–21 win against Canada. In May 2017, O'Donoghue was selected in the squad for the 2017 Summer Tour against the United States and Japan. He started in the first test against Japan on 17 June 2017, helping Ireland to a 50–22 win.

== Honours ==
=== Munster ===
- United Rugby Championship
  - Winner (1): 2022–23

=== Individual ===
- Munster Men's Player of the Year:
  - Winner (1): 2021–22
