= Alex Kendellen =

Irish rugby union player (born 2001)

- Born: 3 March 2001 (age 25) Cork, Ireland
- Height: 1.88 m (6 ft 2 in)
- Weight: 105 kg (16.5 st; 231 lb)
- School: Presentation Brothers College
- University: University College Cork

Rugby union career
- Position: Back-row
Amateur team(s)
Years	Team	Apps	(Points)
- Cork Constitution
2020–	UCC		
Senior career
Years	Team	Apps	(Points)
2021–	Munster	106	(60)
- Correct as of 31 October 2026
International career
Years	Team	Apps	(Points)
2018–2019	Ireland Schools		
2021	Ireland 7s	1	(0)
2021	Ireland U20	5	(30)
2022–	Ireland A	1	(0)
2025–	Ireland	1	(5)
- Correct as of 12 July 2025

Alex Kendellen (born 3 March 2001) is an Irish rugby union player who plays as a flanker for United Rugby Championship club Munster.

== Early life ==
Born in Cork, Kendellen attended Presentation Brothers College and captained the school to the final of the 2020 Munster Schools Rugby Senior Cup, scoring two tries in their 33–10 semi-final win against Limerick school St Munchin's College, though the final against Cork rivals Christian Brothers College was cancelled and the cup shared due to the COVID-19 pandemic.

== Munster ==
Having already won representative honours with Munster under-18s and under-19s, Kendellen joined the Munster academy immediately upon leaving school in June 2020. He made his senior competitive debut for Munster in their 2020–21 Pro14 round 15 match against Welsh side Scarlets on 12 March 2021, coming on as a 28th minute replacement for the injured Fineen Wycherley in Munster's 28–10 win, and made his Champions Cup debut for Munster in their 2021–22 pool B round 2 fixture at home to French club Castres on 18 December 2021, coming on as a replacement for John Hodnett in the province's 19–13 win.

Kendellen made his first start for Munster in their 10–8 away defeat against provincial rivals Connacht in round 9 of the 2021–22 United Rugby Championship on 1 January 2022, and scored his first try for the province one week later in their 18–13 home win against Ulster. For his performances during the 2021–22 season, Kendellen won Munster's John McCarthy Award for Academy Player of the Year when the province's end-of-season awards were announced in June 2022.

Kendellen joined Munster's senior squad on a two-year contract from the 2022–23 season, and extended that contract by a further year in September 2022, meaning Kendellen will remain with the province until at least July 2025. He featured off the bench in Munster's historic 28–14 win against a South Africa XV in Páirc Uí Chaoimh on 10 November 2022, and also came on as a replacement in Munster's 19–14 win against the Stormers in the final of the 2022–23 United Rugby Championship on 27 May 2023.

== Ireland ==
Kendellen represented the Ireland Schools team at the under-18 Six Nations Festival in 2018, and captained the side at the same tournament in 2019. He has also played for the Ireland under-18 Sevens team. He received his first call up to the Ireland 7s team ahead of the International Rugby 7's tournament at St George's Park, England in May 2021, where they played hosts Great Britain and the United States.

Kendellen was selected to captain the Ireland under-20s team at the 2021 Six Nations Under 20s Championship when the squad was announced on 10 June 2021, scoring a try and earning the player of the match award in Ireland's opening 38–7 win against Scotland on 19 June. Kendellen followed up his opening round exploits with another try and strong performance in Ireland's 40–12 win against Wales on 25 June, before a 24–15 defeat against England on 1 July brought an end to Ireland's winning start in the tournament. Looking to get back to winning ways, Ireland suffered a scare against Italy on 7 July, trailing 23–12 at half-time, before two tries from player of the match Kendellen sparked a second-half comeback for a 30–23 Irish victory. In Ireland's final game of the tournament, Kendellen scored two tries in his sides 34–28 defeat against France on 13 July, finishing the tournament with six tries in five games and two player of the match awards, having featured in all but 22 minutes of Ireland's campaign.

Kendellen was selected in the Emerging Ireland squad that travelled to South Africa to participate in the Toyota Challenge against Currie Cup teams Free State Cheetahs, Griquas and Pumas in September–October 2022, however, he was ruled out of the tour due to concussion and returned to Munster to complete the mandatory return-to-play protocols.

== Honours ==
=== Presentation Brothers College ===
- Munster Schools Rugby Senior Cup:
  - Winner (1): 2020 (Note: The 2020 Munster Schools Rugby Senior Cup was shared with Christian Brothers College due to COVID-19 restrictions.)

=== Munster ===
- United Rugby Championship
  - Winner (1): 2022–23

=== Individual ===
- Munster Academy Player of the Year:
  - Winner (1): 2021–22
