= James French (rugby union) =

Irish rugby union player

- Born: 22 November 1998 (age 27) Cork, Ireland
- Height: 1.85 m (6 ft 1 in)
- Weight: 121 kg (19.1 st; 267 lb)
- School: Bandon Grammar School
- University: University College Cork

Rugby union career
- Position: Prop
Amateur team(s)
Years	Team	Apps	(Points)
2021-2022	UCC	4	(0)
2022-23	Highfield	6	(7)
2023-24	Ballynahinch	10	(0)
Senior career
Years	Team	Apps	(Points)
2021–2023	Munster	1	(0)
2023–2024	Ulster	4	(0)
2024-	Cornish Pirates		
- Correct as of 11 May 2024
International career
Years	Team	Apps	(Points)
2018	Ireland U20	5	(0)
- Correct as of 16 March 2018

James French (born 22 November 1998) is an Irish rugby union player. He plays as a prop for the Cornish Pirates.

== Early life ==
Born in Cork, French attended Bandon Grammar School, during which time he was All-Ireland schoolboy shot put champion from his first to fifth years. He began playing rugby as a centre, before transitioning to the back-row, and, finally, to prop.

== Club career ==
French joined the Munster academy ahead of the 2018–19 season, and, after completing the three-year academy programme, was promoted to the senior squad on a one-year contract ahead of the 2021–22 season. Following the disruption caused by the province's recent tour to South Africa, French made his senior competitive debut for Munster in their opening 2021–22 Champions Cup fixture away to English club Wasps on 12 December 2021, starting in the 35–14 win for the province. He signed a two-year contract extension with Munster in January 2022, but was released early from the contract in March 2023 to pursue a new playing opportunity.

French joined United Rugby Championship club Ulster ahead of the 2023–24 season, and left at the end of the season, signing for the Cornish Pirates.

== International career ==
Selected in the Ireland under-20s squad for the 2018 Six Nations Under 20s Championship, French featured off the bench in Ireland's opening round 34–24 defeat against France on 2 February 2018, before making further substitute appearances against Italy, Wales, and England, as well as earning a start against Scotland. French again won selection for the under-20s, this time in the squad for the 2018 World Rugby Under 20 Championship, though he was forced to withdraw from the squad before the opening fixture against France due to a tournament-ending knee injury.
