= Eoin O'Connor =

Irish rugby union player

- Born: 21 July 2000 (age 26) Waterford, Ireland
- Height: 2.01 m (6 ft 7 in)
- Weight: 108 kg (17.0 st; 238 lb)
- School: Gaelcholáiste Phort Láirge

Rugby union career
- Position: Lock
Amateur team(s)
Years	Team	Apps	(Points)
20??–2019	Waterpark		
2019–2023	Young Munster		
Senior career
Years	Team	Apps	(Points)
2021–2023	Munster	4	(0)
2023–	Exeter Chiefs	0	(0)
- Correct as of 29 October 2022

Eoin O'Connor (born 21 July 2000) is an Irish rugby union player who plays as a lock for Premiership Rugby club Exeter Chiefs.

== Early life ==
A native of Waterford, O'Connor joined local club Waterpark and represented the team in the 2018–19 Munster Junior League season whilst a sixth-year student. Ahead of the 2019–20 season, O'Connor joined Limerick All-Ireland League club Young Munster.

== Playing career ==
=== Munster ===
Having previously represented Munster at under-18 and under-19 level, O'Connor made his Munster A debut in their challenge match against provincial rivals Leinster A in January 2019, scoring a try in Munster's 26–22 win. He joined the Munster academy ahead of the 2019–20 season. Following the disruption caused by the province's recent tour to South Africa, O'Connor made his senior competitive debut for Munster in their opening 2021–22 Champions Cup fixture away to English club Wasps on 12 December 2021, starting in the province's 35–14 win.

O'Connor made his league debut for Munster as a replacement for Jean Kleyn in the province's 29–24 away defeat against South African side the Bulls in a rescheduled round 6 fixture during the 2021–22 United Rugby Championship on 12 March 2022. He joined the Munster senior squad on a one-year contract from the 2022–23 season, but was released by the province upon the conclusion of that season.

=== Exeter Chiefs ===
After being released by Munster, O'Connor moved to England to join Premiership Rugby club Exeter Chiefs.

== Honours ==
=== Munster ===
- United Rugby Championship
  - Winner (1): 2022–23
