= Daniel Okeke =

Irish rugby union player (born 2001)

- Born: 26 December 2001 (age 24) Limerick, Ireland
- Height: 1.88 m (6 ft 2 in)
- Weight: 110 kg (17 st; 240 lb)
- School: Ardscoil Rís

Rugby union career
- Position: Back-Row
Amateur team(s)
Years	Team	Apps	(Points)
- Thomond
- Shannon
Senior career
Years	Team	Apps	(Points)
2021–2024	Munster	3	(0)
2024–	Coventry	0	(0)
- Correct as of 23 February 2024
International career
Years	Team	Apps	(Points)
2021	Ireland U20	3	(5)
- Correct as of 7 July 2021

Daniel Okeke (born 26 December 2001) is an Irish rugby union player who plays as a flanker or number eight for Coventry in the RFU Championship.

== Early life ==
Born in Limerick, Okeke first began playing rugby with Thomond, before attending Ardscoil Rís, where his strong carrying and try-scoring performances in the Munster Schools Rugby Senior Cup caught media attention.

== Club career ==
Strong performances for famous Limerick amateur club Shannon saw Okeke, who was part of the National Talent Squad, earn an appearance for Munster A in December 2020, before he joined the Munster academy ahead of the 2021–22 season. Following the disruption caused by the province's recent tour to South Africa, Okeke made his senior competitive debut for Munster in their opening 2021–22 Champions Cup fixture away to English club Wasps on 12 December 2021, starting in the province's 35–14 win.

In May 2024, it was announced that Okeke would be leaving Munster at the end of the season. On 28 May 2024, it was confirmed that Okeke signed for English club Coventry in the RFU Championship from the 2024–25 season.

== International career ==
Okeke was selected in the Ireland under-20s squad for the 2021 Six Nations Under 20s Championship, and made a try-scoring debut off the bench in Ireland's 40–12 win against Wales. He then featured off the bench again in the 24–15 defeat against England, and made his first start for Ireland in their 30–23 win against Italy.
