= 2007–08 Munster Rugby season =

- Ground(s): Thomond Park (Capacity: 13,200); Musgrave Park (Capacity: 8,500)
- CEO: Garrett Fitzgerald
- Coach: Declan Kidney
- Captain: Paul O'Connell
- League: Celtic League
- 2007–08: 3rd

The 2007–08 Munster Rugby season was Munster's seventh season competing in the Celtic League, alongside which they also competed in the Heineken Cup. It was Declan Kidney's third and final season as head coach, in his second spell at the province.

== 2007–08 squad ==
Note: Flags indicate national union under World Rugby eligibility rules. Players may hold more than one non-World Rugby nationality.

Player	Position	Union
Denis Fogarty	Hooker	Ireland
Jerry Flannery	Hooker	Ireland
Frankie Sheahan	Hooker	Ireland
Tony Buckley	Prop	Ireland
John Hayes	Prop	Ireland
Marcus Horan	Prop	Ireland
Darragh Hurley	Prop	Ireland
Federico Pucciariello	Prop	Italy
Tim Ryan	Prop	Ireland
Billy Holland	Lock	Ireland
Mark Melbourne	Lock	Ireland
Donncha O'Callaghan	Lock	Ireland
Paul O'Connell (c)	Lock	Ireland
Mick O'Driscoll	Lock	Ireland
Donnacha Ryan	Lock	Ireland
James Coughlan	Back row	Ireland
Anthony Foley	Back row	Ireland
Denis Leamy	Back row	Ireland
John O'Sullivan	Back row	Ireland
Alan Quinlan	Back row	Ireland
Niall Ronan	Back row	Ireland
David Wallace	Back row	Ireland

Player	Position	Union
Gerry Hurley	Scrum-half	Ireland
Tomás O'Leary	Scrum-half	Ireland
Mike Prendergast	Scrum-half	Ireland
Peter Stringer	Scrum-half	Ireland
Jeremy Manning	Fly-half	Ireland
Ronan O'Gara	Fly-half	Ireland
Paul Warwick	Fly-half	Australia
John Kelly	Centre	Ireland
Kieran Lewis	Centre	Ireland}
Lifeimi Mafi	Centre	New Zealand
Barry Murphy	Centre	Ireland
Rua Tipoki	Centre	New Zealand
Brian Carney	Wing	Ireland
Ian Dowling	Wing	Ireland
Keith Earls	Wing	Ireland
Anthony Horgan	Wing	Ireland
Doug Howlett	Wing	New Zealand
Ciarán O'Boyle	Wing	Ireland
Denis Hurley	Fullback	Ireland
Shaun Payne*	Fullback	South Africa

== Pre-season ==
26 August 2007

United States XV	6–10	(Ireland) Munster
	Report

Toyota Park
Attendance: 8,600

7 September 2007

Munster (Ireland)	15–5	(England) Saracens
	Report

Musgrave Park

14 September 2007

Munster (Ireland)	36–7	(Italy) Viadana
	Report

Musgrave Park

== 2007–08 Celtic League ==
Team	Pld	W	D	L	PF	PA	PD	TF	TA	Try bonus	Losing bonus	Pts
(Ireland) Leinster	18	13	1	4	428	283	+145	44	30	4	3	61
(Wales) Cardiff Blues	18	12	0	6	395	315	+80	48	31	6	2	56
(Ireland) Munster	18	10	1	7	330	258	+72	33	26	2	4	48
(Scotland) Edinburgh	18	9	3	6	313	285	+28	35	29	3	3	48
(Scotland) Glasgow Warriors	18	10	1	7	340	349	−9	31	38	1	3	46
(Wales) Llanelli Scarlets	18	7	0	11	403	362	+41	45	38	6	5	39
(Wales) Ospreys	18	6	1	11	321	255	+66	24	24	2	9	37
(Wales) Newport Gwent Dragons	18	7	1	10	282	394	−112	31	44	1	3	34
(Ireland) Ulster	18	6	1	11	278	407	−129	33	41	2	1	29
(Ireland) Connacht	18	5	1	12	214	396	−182	16	39	0	2	24
Under the standard bonus point system, points are awarded as follows: 4 points for a win; 2 points for a draw; 1 bonus point for scoring 4 tries (or more) (Try bonus); 1 bonus point for losing by 7 points (or fewer) (Losing bonus)
Source: RaboDirect PRO12

22 September 2007
19:30

Munster (Ireland)	26–16	(Wales) Scarlets
	Report

Musgrave Park
Attendance: 3,400
Referee: Peter Allan

28 September 2007
18:10

Newport Gwent Dragons (Wales)	16–26	(Ireland) Munster
	Report

Rodney Parade
Attendance: 4,537

5 October 2007
19:30

Munster (Ireland)	17–19	(Wales) Cardiff Blues
	Report

Musgrave Park
Attendance: 6,075
Referee: David Changleng

14 October 2007
16:10

Ospreys (Wales)	16–3	(Ireland) Munster
	Report

Liberty Stadium
Attendance: 7,740
Referee: Simon McDowell

26 October 2007
19:30

Glasgow Warriors (Scotland)	11–11	(Ireland) Munster
	Report

Firhill Stadium
Attendance: 1,829
Referee: James Jones

3 November 2007
19:30

Munster (Ireland)	19–16	(Scotland) Edinburgh
	Report

Musgrave Park
Attendance: 8,300
Referee: Tim Hayes

24 November 2007
19:30

Munster (Ireland)	45–19	(Wales) Newport Gwent Dragons
	Report

Musgrave Park
Attendance: 8,250
Referee: Rob Debney

30 November 2007
19:30

Munster (Ireland)	3–10	(Ireland) Leinster
	Report

Musgrave Park
Attendance: 8,300
Referee: Wayne Barnes

27 December 2007
19:30

Munster (Ireland)	17–0	(Ireland) Connacht
	Report

Musgrave Park
Attendance: 6,125
Referee: Colin Stanley

15 February 2008
19:30

Edinburgh (Scotland)	7–11	(Ireland) Munster
	Report

Murrayfield
Attendance: 4,100
Referee: Tim Hayes

1 March 2008
17:30

Cardiff Blues (Wales)	25–22	(Ireland) Munster
	Report

Cardiff Arms Park
Attendance: 11,269
Referee: Peter Allan

22 March 2008
19:30

Munster (Ireland)	42–6	(Ireland) Ulster
	Report

Musgrave Park
Attendance: 7,500
Referee: Alain Rolland

28 March 2008
19:30

Connacht (Ireland)	5–16	(Ireland) Munster
	Report

Galway Sportsgrounds
Attendance: 5,368
Referee: Simon McDowell

12 April 2008
18:30

Leinster (Ireland)	21–12	(Ireland) Munster
	Report

RDS Arena
Attendance: 18,500
Referee: Chris White

19 April 2008
19:35

Munster (Ireland)	9–8	(Wales) Ospreys
	Report

Musgrave Park
Attendance: 7,500

30 April 2008
19:30

Ulster (Ireland)	19–9	(Ireland) Munster
	Report

Ravenhill
Attendance: 12,300
Referee: Alain Rolland

3 May 2008
14:45

Scarlets (Wales)	23–24	(Ireland) Munster
	Report

Stradey Park
Attendance: 7,020

10 May 2008
17:00

Munster (Ireland)	18–21	(Scotland) Glasgow Warriors
	Report

Musgrave Park
Attendance: 5,360
Referee: James Jones

== 2007–08 Heineken Cup ==
=== Pool 5 ===
Team	P	W	D	L	Tries for	Tries against	Try diff	Points for	Points against	Points diff	TB	LB	Pts
(Ireland) Munster (6)	6	4	0	2	13	7	6	148	95	53	1	2	19
(France) Clermont	6	4	0	2	22	15	7	189	128	61	2	1	19
(England) London Wasps	6	4	0	2	19	12	7	152	127	25	2	0	18
(Wales) Llanelli Scarlets	6	0	0	6	8	28	−20	74	213	−139	0	0	0

10 November 2007
17:30

London Wasps (England)	24–23	(Ireland) Munster
	Report

Ricoh Arena
Attendance: 21,506

18 November 2007
16:00

Munster (Ireland)	36–13	(France) Clermont
	Report

Thomond Park
Attendance: 12,003
Referee: Nigel Owens

8 December 2007
17:30

Scarlets (Wales)	16–29	(Ireland) Munster
	Report

Stradey Park
Attendance: 10,365
Referee: Wayne Barnes

16 December 2007
13:00

Munster (Ireland)	22–13	(Wales) Scarlets
	Report

Thomond Park
Attendance: 13,200
Referee: Dave Pearson

13 January 2008
16:00

Clermont (France)	26–19	(Ireland) Munster
	Report

Stade Marcel-Michelin
Referee: Rob Debney

19 January 2008
17:35

Munster (Ireland)	19–3	(England) London Wasps
	Report

Thomond Park
Attendance: 12,257
Referee: Nigel Owens

=== Quarter-final ===
5 April 2008
17:30

Gloucester (England)	3–16	(Ireland) Munster
	Report

Kingsholm
Attendance: 16,500
Referee: Nigel Owens

=== Semi-final ===
27 April 2008
15:00

Saracens (England)	16–18	(Ireland) Munster
	Report

Ricoh Arena
Attendance: 30,325
Referee: Nigel Owens

=== Final ===
24 May 2008
17:00

Munster (Ireland)	16–13	(France) Toulouse
	Report

Millennium Stadium
Attendance: 74,500
Referee: Nigel Owens
