= RG Snyman =

South African rugby union player

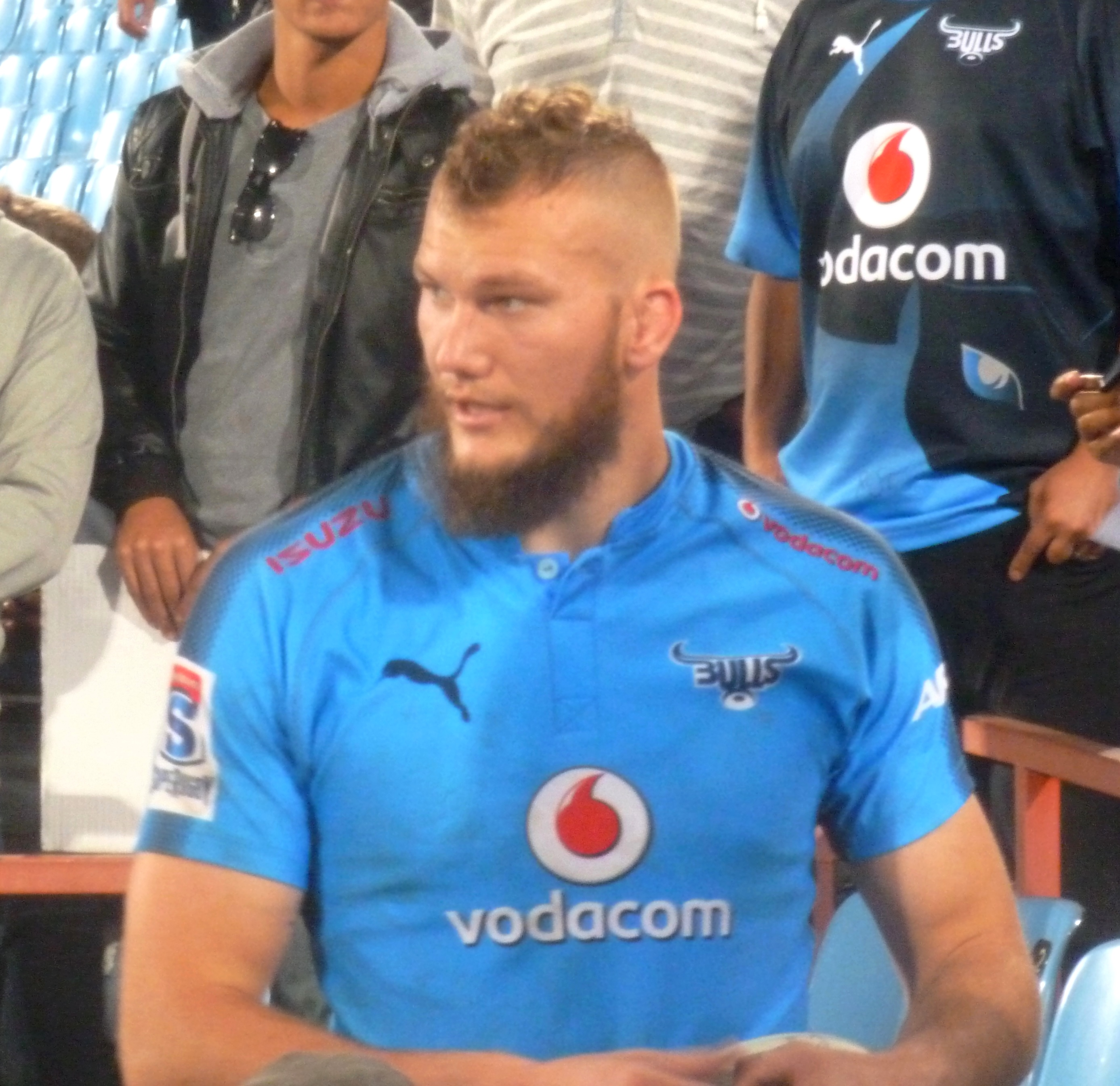
- Snyman playing in 2017
- Full name: Rudolph Gerhardus Snyman
- Born: 29 January 1995 (age 31) Potchefstroom, South Africa
- Height: 2.06 m (6 ft 9 in)
- Weight: 131 kg (20.6 st; 289 lb)
- School: Afrikaanse Hoër Seunskool

Rugby union career
- Position: Lock
Youth career
- 2008–2014: Blue Bulls
Senior career
Years	Team	Apps	(Points)
2015–2016	Blue Bulls	23	(5)
2015–2019	Bulls	49	(10)
2017–2020	Mie Honda Heat	18	(30)
2020–2024	Munster	20	(30)
2024–	Leinster	22	(20)
- Correct as of 13 June 2025
International career
Years	Team	Apps	(Points)
2013	South Africa Schools	3	(0)
2015	South Africa Under-20	5	(0)
2016	South Africa 'A'	3	(0)
2018–	South Africa	50	(15)
- Correct as of 13 September 2025
Medal record
Men's Rugby 15's
Representing South Africa
Rugby World Cup
Gold medal – first place	2019 Japan	Squad
Gold medal – first place	2023 France	Squad

Rudolph Gerhardus Snyman (born 29 January 1995) is a South African rugby union player who plays as a lock for Irish United Rugby Championship club Leinster and the South Africa national team. Snyman was part of the South Africa team that won the Rugby World Cup in 2019 and 2023, and is widely known as 'The Viking' among fans and teammates in reference to his appearance.

== Early career ==
Snyman represented the Blue Bulls from primary school level, when he played in the 2008 Under-13 Craven Week competition. He then represented them at the 2011 Under-16 Grant Khomo Week in East London, where he scored a try in their match against Boland. Snyman also represented them at the 2013 Under-18 Craven Week tournament in Polokwane, where he made three appearances. After the tournament, Snyman was selected in the South Africa Schools team that played three matches against European counterparts in August 2013; he started and helped in winning their matches against England, France and Wales.

== Club career ==
=== Blue Bulls ===
After secondary school, Snyman joined the Blue Bulls Academy and represented the Blue Bulls U19 side during the 2014 Under-19 Provincial Championship. He got off to a flying start for the U19s, scoring a try in their opening match of the season in a 29–17 victory over Eastern Province U19. He eventually played in ten matches during the regular season, contributing one more try in their match against Free State U19 and helping them to finish top of the league to qualify to the semi-finals. He started both the semi-final – a 43–20 win against the Sharks U19 – and the final, which they lost 26–33 against the hosts Western Province U19 in Cape Town.

In 2015, Snyman was included in the Bulls Super Rugby squad prior to the 2015 Super Rugby season despite not having featured in any first class matches up to that point. However, he didn't get any game time and reverted to the Blue Bulls squad for the 2015 Vodacom Cup. He made his senior debut in the first match of that competition, a 37–13 victory over Gauteng rivals the Falcons in Kempton Park. He also started their next three matches against the Leopards, Golden Lions, and Pumas. In June 2015, he extended his contract at the Bulls until October 2017.

=== Japanese league ===
Snyman joined Japanese Top Challenge League side Mie Honda Heat for the 2017 Top Challenge League season, where he suffered a knee injury that required surgery. After the 2019 Rugby World Cup, where Snyman was a member of the victorious South African team, he returned to Japanese Top League side Mie Honda Heat.

=== Munster ===
Snyman joined Irish United Rugby Championship side Munster, whose head coach was former Springboks forwards coach Johann van Graan at the time. Though his two-year contract with province didn't commence until 1 July 2020, Snyman arrived in Ireland in May 2020 following the cancellation of the remainder of the 2019–20 Top League due to COVID-19. Snyman made his debut for Munster in their 27–25 defeat against Leinster on 22 August 2020, though his first appearance for the province lasted only 7 minutes after he suffered a torn ACL during a lineout. Snyman was nearing a return from the injury, but suffered a setback during his rehabilitation that required minor surgery. In a further blow, Snyman also sustained substantial burns following a firepit accident.

Snyman made his long-awaited return from injury in Munster's opening 2021–22 United Rugby Championship fixture against the Sharks on 25 September 2021, coming on as a replacement for Fineen Wycherley in their 42–17 win against the South African side, and scored his first try for the province one week later in their 34–18 win against the Stormers. In what was only his third game back for Munster, and his fourth appearance overall for the province, Snyman suffered a re-rupture of his cruciate ligament ten minutes after coming on as a 51st minute replacement for Thomas Ahern in Munster's 43–13 win against Welsh side Scarlets on 10 October 2021, and endured another long spell out of the game. Snyman signed a two-year contract extension with Munster in January 2022.

After 17 months out, Snyman made his return from injury on 3 March 2023 when he came off the bench in Munster's 2022–23 United Rugby Championship round 15 fixture at home to Scarlets, replacing Jean Kleyn during the second half of Munster's 49–42 win. He came on as a replacement in Munster's 19–14 win against the Stormers in the final of the 2022–23 United Rugby Championship on 27 May 2023.

=== Leinster ===
In December 2023, The Irish Times reported that Snyman would be leaving Munster to join rivals Leinster at the end of the 2023–24 season. Munster could only retain the services of one of their two non-Irish qualified locks and chose to renew fellow Springbok Jean Kleyn's contract ahead of Snyman's.

In June 2025, following the completion of his first season with the club, he was named URC Players' Player of the Season. That month, he also helped Leinster win the 2024–25 URC final with a 32–7 victory against his former club the Bulls.

== International career ==
=== South Africa under-20s ===
Snyman was named in a 37-man training squad for the South Africa national under-20 rugby union team and featured for them in a friendly match against a Varsity Cup Dream Team in April 2015. Despite missing out on their two-match tour of Argentina, he was named in the final squad for the 2015 World Rugby Under 20 Championship upon the team's return. He started all three of their matches in Pool B of the competition; a 33–5 win against hosts Italy, a 40–8 win against Samoa and a 46–13 win over Australia to help South Africa finish top of Pool B to qualify for the semi-finals with the best record pool stage of all the teams in the competition. Snyman started their semi-final match against England, but could not prevent them losing 20–28 to be eliminated from the competition by England for the second year in succession and also started their third-place play-off match against France, helping South Africa to a 31–18 win to secure third place in the competition.

=== South Africa 'A' ===
In 2016, Snyman was included in a South Africa 'A' squad that played a two-match series against a touring England Saxons team. He came on as a replacement in their first match in Bloemfontein, but ended on the losing side as the visitors ran out 32–24 winners. He then started the second match of the series, a 26–29 defeat to the Saxons in George.

Snyman also represented the World XV in 2017 in a match against Japan.

=== South Africa ===
Snyman was named in South Africa's squad for the 2019 Rugby World Cup. He played all 7 games, mainly off the bench, and scored his first test try against Italy. South Africa won the tournament, defeating England in the final. Despite an injury-disrupted 2020–21 season and burns sustained during a firepit accident, Snyman was selected by head coach Jacques Nienaber in South Africa's squad for the 2021 British & Irish Lions tour to South Africa, however, the aforementioned burns required a skin graft, ruling Snyman out of the series. He initially returned to Munster for his rehabilitation, but rejoined the South Africa squad for the 2021 Rugby Championship. After suffering a knee ligament re-rupture during his comeback for Munster, Snyman was ruled out of South Africa's 2021 end-of-year tour.

Snyman made his long-awaited international return for South Africa when he was used as a replacement in their 43–12 win against Australia in round one of the 2023 Rugby Championship on 8 July 2023. It was Snyman's first appearance for South Africa since the 2019 Rugby World Cup final, and he was subsequently selected in the 33-man squad for 2023 Rugby World Cup.

In September 2025, he scored a try in the largest victory ever on New Zealand home soil, a 43–10 win during the 2025 Rugby Championship.

== Statistics ==
=== International analysis by opposition ===
Against	Played	Won	Lost	Drawn	Tries	Points	% Won
Argentina	6	5	1	0	0	0	83.33
Australia	4	3	1	0	0	0	75
Canada	1	1	0	0	0	0	100
England	7	5	2	0	1	5	71.43
France	3	3	0	0	0	0	100
Georgia	1	1	0	0	0	0	100
Ireland	4	2	2	0	0	0	50
Italy	3	3	0	0	1	5	100
Japan	3	3	0	0	0	0	100
Namibia	1	1	0	0	0	0	100
New Zealand	8	4	3	1	1	5	50
Portugal	1	1	0	0	0	0	100
Romania	1	1	0	0	0	0	100
Scotland	3	3	0	0	0	0	100
Wales	4	3	1	0	0	0	75
Total	50	39	10	1	3	15	78

=== International Tries ===
Try	Opposing team	Location	Venue	Competition	Date	Result	Score
1	Italy	Fukuroi, Japan	Shizuoka Stadium	2019 Rugby World Cup Pool B	4 October 2019	Win	49–3
2	England	Saint-Denis, France	Stade de France	2023 Rugby World Cup semi-final	21 October 2023	Win	15–16
3	New Zealand	Wellington, New Zealand	Wellington Regional Stadium	2025 Rugby Championship	13 September 2025	Win	10–43

Correct as of 23 November 2025

== Honours ==
=== Munster ===
- United Rugby Championship
  - Winner (1): 2022–23

=== Leinster ===
- United Rugby Championship
  - Winner (2): 2024–25, 2025-26

=== South Africa ===
- Rugby World Cup
  - Winner (2): 2019, 2023
- Rugby Championship
  - Winner (2): 2019, 2025
