= Mike Haley (rugby union) =

Irish rugby union player

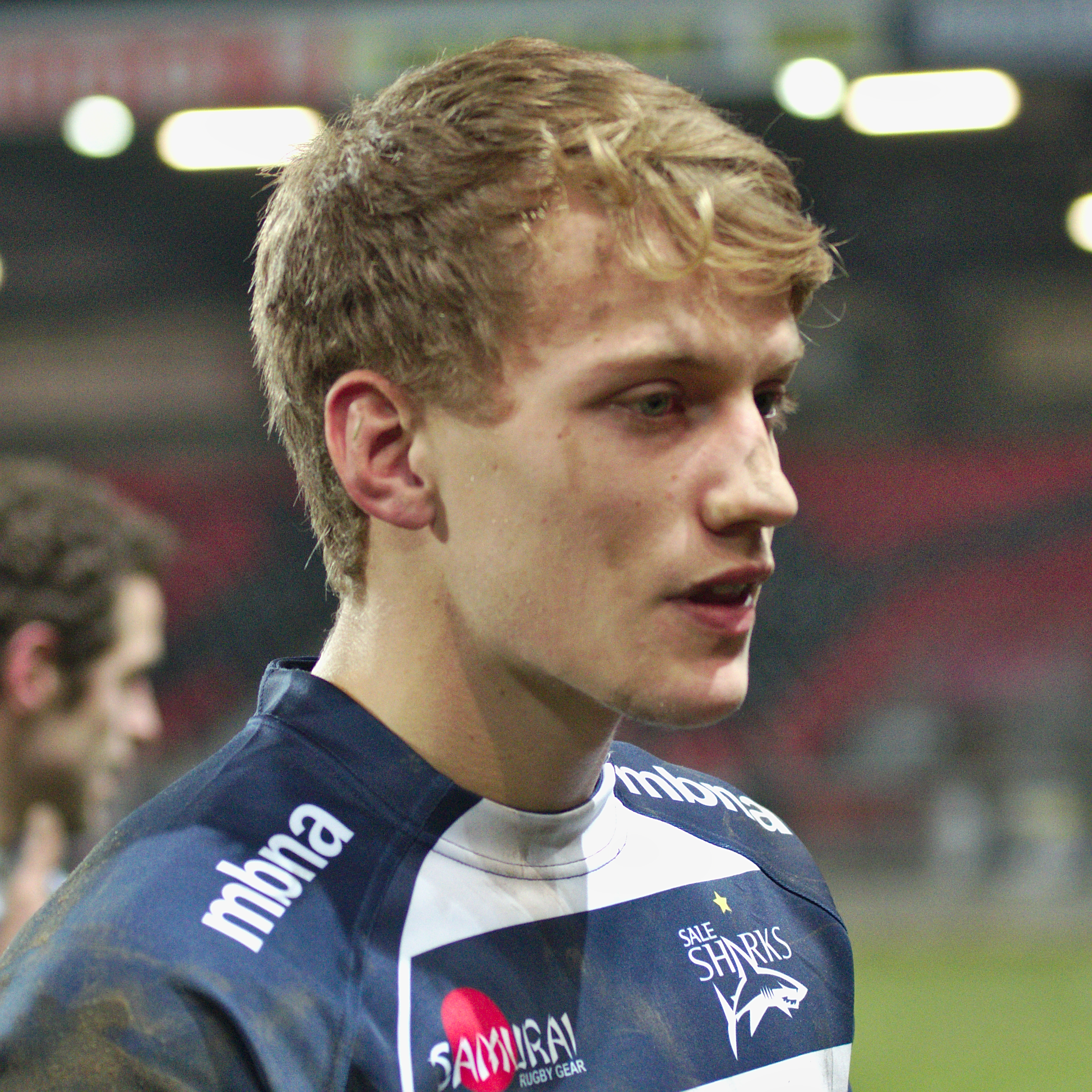
- Haley playing for Sale Sharks in 2013
- Born: Michael Patrick Haley; 28 June 1994 (age 32) Preston, England
- Height: 1.91 m (6 ft 3 in)
- Weight: 93 kg (14.6 st; 205 lb)
- School: Hutton Grammar School; Myerscough College; Hartpury College

Rugby union career
- Position: Fullback
Senior career
Years	Team	Apps	(Points)
2013–2018	Sale Sharks	109	(80)
2012–2013	→ Preston (loan)	10	(7)
2018–	Munster	140	(150)
- Correct as of 26 September 2026
International career
Years	Team	Apps	(Points)
2016	England Saxons	2	(0)
2017	England XV	1	(0)
2019	Ireland	1	(0)
- Correct as of 10 August 2019

Michael Patrick Haley (born 28 June 1994) is an English-born, Irish-qualified rugby union player who plays as a fullback for United Rugby Championship club Munster.

== Club career ==
=== Sale Sharks ===
Haley made his professional debut for Sale against Saracens on 10 March 2013, in the semi-final of the 2012–13 LV Cup.

=== Munster ===
It was announced in February 2018 that Haley would be joining Irish United Rugby Championship side Munster on a three-year contract at the start of the 2018–19 season. Haley is Irish-qualified through his maternal grandmother, who hails from Tralee, County Kerry. He made his competitive debut for Munster on 1 September 2018, starting at fullback in their opening 2018–19 Pro14 fixture against South African side Cheetahs in Thomond Park, a game which Munster won 38–0.

Haley made his European debut for Munster on 13 October 2018, starting in the provinces 10–10 draw with Exeter Chiefs in Sandy Park in the sides' opening 2018–19 Champions Cup fixture. He scored his first try for Munster on 20 October 2018, doing so in the provinces 36–22 win against Gloucester. Haley signed a two-year contract extension with Munster in March 2021, and extended that contract by a further two years in September 2022.

Haley started and scored one try in Munster's historic 28–14 win against a South Africa XV in Páirc Uí Chaoimh on 10 November 2022, and started in Munster's 19–14 win against the Stormers in the final of the 2022–23 United Rugby Championship on 27 May 2023.

== International career ==
Haley received his first call-up to the senior England squad by coach Eddie Jones for a three-day training camp in May 2016. He made his debut for the England Saxons on their tour against South Africa A in June 2016. However, this appearance did not tie him fully to the RFU because, at the time, South Africa A was not SARU's second team. Haley was subsequently named in a provisional elite player squad for the 2016–17 season.

Haley represented an England XV in the Old Mutual Wealth Cup against the Barbarians in a non-cap international at Twickenham Stadium in May 2017. Again, this match did not tie him to the RFU as the Barbarians are a club team, and he thus remained eligible for future Ireland selection.

In May 2019, Haley was named by Ireland head coach Joe Schmidt in a 44-man training squad for the 2019 Rugby World Cup. Along with Munster teammate Jean Kleyn, this was Haley's first time being named in an Ireland squad. He made his debut for Ireland in their 2019 Rugby World Cup warm-up match against Italy on 10 August 2019, featuring as a replacement in the 29–10 win. However, Haley was dropped from the squad before the 2019 Rugby World Cup.

== Honours ==
=== Munster ===
- United Rugby Championship
  - Winner (1): 2022–23
