= 2023 United Rugby Championship Grand Final =

Rugby union match

- Event: 2022–23 United Rugby Championship
Stormers	Munster
(South Africa)	(Ireland)
14	19
- Date: 27 May 2023
- Venue: Cape Town Stadium, Cape Town
- Man of the Match: John Hodnett (Munster)
- Referee: Andrea Piardi
- Attendance: 56,344
- Weather: Dry

The 2023 United Rugby Championship Grand Final was the final match of the 2022–23 United Rugby Championship season. The final was between defending champions the Stormers and Munster with Munster winning 19–14 to claim their fourth domestic title.

== Route to the final ==
Quarter-finals
1	(Ireland) Leinster	35
8	(South Africa) Sharks	5
4	(Scotland) Glasgow Warriors	5
5	(Ireland) Munster	14
2	(Ireland) Ulster	10
7	(Ireland) Connacht	15
3	(South Africa) Stormers	33
6	(South Africa) Bulls	21

Semi-finals
1	(Ireland) Leinster	15
5	(Ireland) Munster	16
7	(Ireland) Connacht	25
3	(South Africa) Stormers	43

Final
5	(Ireland) Munster	19
3	(South Africa) Stormers	14

Munster had an up-and-down season, at one point being fourteenth in the table after losing five of their seven opening rounds of the season, but a strong finish to the season, including an away win against the Stormers and an away draw against the Sharks, saw Munster qualify for the knockout stage of the competition and finish fifth overall. The province's burst of late-season away form continued into the play-offs, as they defeated Glasgow Warriors 14–5 away from home in the quarter-finals, before defeating Leinster 16–15, also away from home, in the semi-finals.

The Stormers, the defending champions after they won the first United Rugby Championship in 2021–22, by contrast enjoyed a strong season, finishing third overall and defeating South African rivals the Bulls 33–21 in their quarter-final and Connacht 43–25 in the semi-finals to advance to a home final for a second season in a row.

== Venue and ticketing ==
Because the Stormers were the highest-ranked team to reach the Grand Final, they hosted the match at Cape Town Stadium. All tickets for the final were sold within three hours of going on sale.

== Match details ==
27 May 2023
18:30 SAST / 17:30 IST

Stormers (South Africa)	14–19	(Ireland) Munster
Try: Libbok 5' c Fourie 49' c Con: Libbok (2/2) 6', 50'		Try: Barron 9' m Nash 28' c Hodnett 74' c Con: Crowley (2/3) 30', 76'

Cape Town Stadium
Attendance: 56,344
Referee: Andrea Piardi (Italy)

FB	15	(South Africa) Damian Willemse
RW	14	(South Africa) Angelo Davids
OC	13	(South Africa) Ruhan Nel
IC	12	(South Africa) Dan du Plessis
LW	11	(South Africa) Leolin Zas
FH	10	(South Africa) Manie Libbok
SH	9	(South Africa) Herschel Jantjies
N8	8	(South Africa) Evan Roos
OF	7	(South Africa) Hacjivah Dayimani
BF	6	(South Africa) Deon Fourie
RL	5	(South Africa) Marvin Orie
LL	4	(South Africa) Ruben van Heerden
TP	3	(South Africa) Frans Malherbe
HK	2	(South Africa) Joseph Dweba
LP	1	(South Africa) Steven Kitshoff (c)
Substitutions:
HK	16	(South Africa) JJ Kotze
PR	17	(South Africa) Ali Vermaak
PR	18	(South Africa) Neethling Fouché
LK	19	(South Africa) Ben-Jason Dixon
FL	20	(South Africa) Willie Engelbrecht
FL	21	(South Africa) Marcel Theunissen
SH	22	(South Africa) Paul de Wet
FB	23	(South Africa) Clayton Blommetjies
Coach:
(South Africa) John Dobson

FB	15	(Ireland) Mike Haley
RW	14	(Ireland) Calvin Nash
OC	13	(Ireland) Antoine Frisch
IC	12	(Tonga) Malakai Fekitoa
LW	11	(Ireland) Shane Daly
FH	10	(Ireland) Jack Crowley
SH	9	(Ireland) Conor Murray
N8	8	(Ireland) Gavin Coombes
OF	7	(Ireland) John Hodnett
BF	6	(Ireland) Peter O'Mahony (c)
RL	5	(Ireland) Tadhg Beirne
LL	4	(South Africa) Jean Kleyn
TP	3	(Ireland) Stephen Archer
HK	2	(Ireland) Diarmuid Barron
LP	1	(Ireland) Jeremy Loughman
Substitutions:
HK	16	(Ireland) Niall Scannell
PR	17	(Ireland) Josh Wycherley
PR	18	(Ireland) Roman Salanoa
LK	19	(South Africa) RG Snyman
BR	20	(Ireland) Alex Kendellen
SH	21	(Ireland) Craig Casey
FH	22	(Scotland) Ben Healy
UB	23	(Ireland) Keith Earls
Coach:
(England) Graham Rowntree

Man of the Match:
John Hodnett (Munster)

Assistant referees:
Mike Adamson (Scotland)
Craig Evans (Wales)
Television match official:
Ben Whitehouse (Wales)

== Broadcasting ==
The match was televised live by SuperSport in South Africa, by TG4 in Ireland, and by Viaplay Sports in Ireland and the United Kingdom.
