= Jack Crowley =

Irish rugby union player (born 2000)

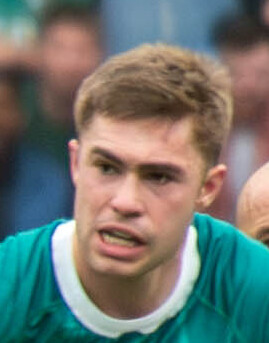
- Crowley in 2025
- Born: 13 January 2000 (age 26) Cork, Ireland
- Height: 1.85 m (6 ft 1 in)
- Weight: 89 kg (14.0 st; 196 lb)
- School: Bandon Grammar School

Rugby union career
- Position(s): Fly-half, Centre, Fullback
Senior career
Years	Team	Apps	(Points)
2021–	Munster	85	(455)
- Correct as of 18 April 2026
International career
Years	Team	Apps	(Points)
2020	Ireland U20	3	(36)
2022	Emerging Ireland	3	(18)
2022	Ireland Wolfhounds	1	(2)
2022–	Ireland	35	(231)
- Correct as of 14 March 2026
National sevens team
Years	Team		Comps
2021	Ireland		1

Jack Crowley (born 13 January 2000) is an Irish professional rugby union player who currently plays as a fly-half for United Rugby Championship club Munster and the Ireland national team.

== Early life ==
Born in Innishannon, County Cork, Crowley first began playing rugby with Bandon. There is a Crowley family connection with the club as Crowley's father, uncles, cousins and brothers have all played for it too. Whilst Crowley was playing for the club's under-18s side, they won the Munster Under-18 Cup and the All-Ireland Under-18 Cup, with Crowley scoring 15 points in the 20–7 win against Skerries under-18s in the latter.

Crowley attended Bandon Grammar School and played three years of senior rugby with the school, firstly as a scrum-half before moving to fly-half, and helped guide the school to the semi-final stage of the Munster Schools Senior Cup for the first time in 2017, as well as a second semi-final in 2019, though Presentation Brothers College defeated them on both occasions. Crowley was captain during his third year and scored 21 points in their quarter-final replay win against Glenstal Abbey School, who were defending champions.

To play in the amateur All-Ireland League, Crowley moved to Cork Constitution in 2019, where his older brother Billy was already on the books. In recognition of his performances for Con during the 2019–20 season, Crowley was awarded the All-Ireland League Division 1A Rising Star accolade in May 2020.

Crowley is a nephew of former Valley Rovers camogie player Elaine Burke, who captained Cork to an All-Ireland Senior Camogie Championship title in 2005.

== Munster ==
Crowley played in all seven of Munster A's fixtures during the 2019–20 Celtic Cup, starting at fly-half and captaining the side in their opening 20–20 draw against Ospreys Development, before featuring as a replacement in the defeats to Dragons A, Leinster A and Connacht Eagles, starting at fullback in the win against Cardiff Blues A and the defeat against Scarlets A, and coming off the bench in the final fixture against Ulster A, which Munster A won 31–12.

Previously a member of the province's sub-academy, Crowley joined Munster's academy ahead of the 2020–21 season, and made his senior competitive debut for the province in their 2020–21 Pro14 round ten fixture against provincial rivals Ulster on 2 January 2021, coming on as a 65th minute replacement for fellow academy fly-half Ben Healy and converting Darren Sweetnam's late try to secure a losing bonus-point for Munster in their 15–10 defeat.

Crowley joined the senior squad on a two-year contract from the 2021–22 season, and made his first start for Munster in their 18–10 away defeat against Welsh side Ospreys in round 5 of the United Rugby Championship on 23 October 2021. Crowley made his Champions Cup debut for Munster in their 2021–22 pool B round 2 fixture at home to French club Castres on 18 December 2021, coming on as a replacement for Ben Healy in the province's 19–13 win. In the reverse fixture away to Castres on 14 January 2022, Crowley made his first start in the Champions Cup and scored 11 points off the kicking tee in Munster's 16–13 win.

Crowley signed a two-year contract extension with the province in December 2022, a deal that will see him remain with Munster until at least June 2025. Crowley scored a 77th minute drop goal for Munster to secure a 16–15 win away to Leinster in the semi-finals of the 2022–23 United Rugby Championship on 13 May 2023, and won Men's Young Player of the Year at the 2023 Rugby Players Ireland awards. He started and scored two conversions in Munster's 19–14 win against the Stormers in the final of the 2022–23 United Rugby Championship on 27 May 2023.

== Ireland ==
Selected in the Ireland under-20s squad for the 2020 Six Nations Under 20s Championship, Crowley started at fly-half in the opening 38–26 win against Scotland, scoring 18 points, including a superb solo try from his own 22, and earning the Man-of-the-Match award. He also started in the 36–20 win against Wales and the 39–21 win against England, the latter of which secured the triple crown for Ireland under-20s for the second year running, though the remainder of the tournament was cancelled due to the COVID-19 pandemic.

Crowley received his first call up to the Ireland 7s team ahead of the International Rugby 7's tournament at St George's Park, England in May 2021, where they played hosts Great Britain and the United States. Crowley was selected in the Emerging Ireland squad that travelled to South Africa to participate in the Toyota Challenge against Currie Cup teams Free State Cheetahs, Griquas and Pumas in September–October 2022. He started and scored six conversions in Emerging Ireland's 54–7 opening win against Griquas on 30 September, featured as a replacement in the 28–24 win against the Pumas on 5 October, before starting again and scoring three conversions in the 21–14 win against the Cheetahs on 9 October.

Following the Toyota Challenge, Crowley was also selected in the Ireland A panel that joined the senior Ireland team after round 7 of the 2022–23 United Rugby Championship to face an All Blacks XV on 4 November 2022; Crowley featured as a replacement in Ireland A's 47–19 defeat.

=== Men’s national team ===
Crowley received his first senior international call-up for Ireland’s 2022 Autumn Nations Series fixture against Fiji. Crowley made his senior international debut for Ireland in the game against Fiji on 12 November, replacing Munster teammate Joey Carbery at fly-half early in the second-half of the match and scoring two conversions in Ireland's 35–17 win. Crowley made his first senior international start for Ireland against Australia on 19 November, scoring a penalty and conversion in their 13–10 win.

Crowley was selected in his first senior Ireland squad for the Six Nations ahead of the 2023 tournament, and made his tournament debut as a replacement in Ireland's 34–20 away win against Italy in round three on 25 February. Ireland went on win the grand slam.

During the 2023 Rugby World Cup warm-up matches, Crowley started in Ireland's opening 33–17 win against Italy on 5 August, featured as a replacement in the 29–10 win against England on 19 August, before starting again in the 17–13 win against Samoa on 26 August. He was selected in Ireland's 33-man squad for the 2023 Rugby World Cup, and featured as a replacement in their opening 82–8 win against Romania on 9 September, the 13–8 win against South Africa on 23 September, and the 36–14 win against Scotland on 7 October.

Crowley was once again selected for the following 2024 Six Nations Championship. He started in the opener versus France in Marseille on 2 February, helping Ireland to a record 38-17 win against France. He started the following weekend in Ireland's match at home to Italy, scoring his first senior try and kicking two conversions on the way to a 36-0 win. He ended up playing every available minute of the tournament.

Despite starting every game of the tournament in the previous year, he would only go on to make one start during the 2025 Six Nations in 22–17 victory over Italy, having lost his place in the pecking order to Sam Prendergast.

== Statistics ==
=== International analysis by opposition ===
Against	Played	Won	Lost	Drawn	Tries	Cons	Pens	Drops	Points	% Won
Australia	1	1	0	0	0	1	1	0	5	100
England	2	1	1	0	0	1	4	0	14	50
Fiji	1	1	0	0	0	2	0	0	4	100
France	1	1	0	0	0	5	1	0	13	100
Italy	3	3	0	0	1	5	0	0	15	100
Romania	1	1	0	0	0	4	0	0	8	100
Samoa	1	1	0	0	0	1	0	0	2	100
Scotland	2	2	0	0	0	2	1	0	7	100
South Africa	1	1	0	0	0	0	1	0	3	100
Wales	1	1	0	0	0	4	1	0	11	100
Total	14	13	1	0	1	25	9	0	82	92.86

Correct as of 17 March 2024

== Honours ==
=== Individual ===
- All-Ireland League Division 1A Rising Star:
  - Winner (1): 2019–20
- Rugby Players Ireland Men's Young Player of the Year:
  - Winner (1): 2023

=== Cork Constitution ===
- Munster Senior Cup:
  - Winner (1): 2019–20

=== Munster ===
- United Rugby Championship
  - Winner (1): 2022–23

=== Ireland under-20s ===
- Triple Crown:
  - Winner (1): 2020

=== Ireland ===
- Six Nations Championship:
  - Winner (2): 2023, 2024
- Grand Slam:
  - Winner (1): 2023
- Triple Crown:
  - Winner (3): 2023, 2025, 2026
