= Rowan Osborne (rugby union) =

Irish rugby union player

- Born: 3 November 1996 (age 30) Eadestown, Ireland
- Height: 1.70 m (5 ft 7 in)
- Weight: 78 kg (12.3 st; 172 lb)

Rugby union career
- Position: Scrum-half
Amateur team(s)
Years	Team	Apps	(Points)
- Naas
- Dublin University
Senior career
Years	Team	Apps	(Points)
2019–2021	Leinster	11	(5)
2021–2022	Munster	2	(0)
- Correct as of 2 October 2021
International career
Years	Team	Apps	(Points)
- Ireland U18
- Irish Universities

Rowan Osborne (3 November 1996) is an Irish former rugby union player. He played as a scrum-half and represented Dublin University in the amateur All-Ireland League.

== Leinster ==
Whilst playing amateur rugby in the All-Ireland League for Dublin University, Osborne was recommended to Leinster during their 2019–20 pre-season training by Noel McNamara, an elite player development officer with the province, and Tony Smeeth, one of the coaches at Dublin University. He made his debut of the bench for the province in their 53–5 win against Welsh side Ospreys in round 2 of the 2019–20 Pro14 on 4 October 2019, before featuring off the bench again one week later, scoring his first try for the province in their 40–14 win against Scottish side Edinburgh.

Following these two appearances, and his performances for Leinster A in the 2019–20 Celtic Cup and for Dublin University in the All-Ireland League, Osborne was awarded a professional contract with the province for the remainder of the 2019–20 season. Ahead of Leinster's inter-provincial clash against old rivals Munster on 28 December 2019, Osborne was named in the starting XV at short-notice after original starting scrum-half Jamison Gibson-Park withdrew from the team due to illness. In his first senior start for the province, Osborne played 65 minutes, helping his team to a 13–6 win in Thomond Park.

== Munster ==
Osborne joined Munster on a one-year contract for the 2021–22 season, and made his competitive debut for the province as a replacement for Craig Casey in their 42–17 win against the Sharks on 25 September 2021, in what was the provinces opening 2021–22 United Rugby Championship fixture. Osborne was forced to retire from rugby at the end of the 2021–22 season on medical grounds due to concussion.

== Honours ==
=== Leinster ===
- United Rugby Championship
  - Winner (2): 2019–20, 2020–21
