= Ciarán O'Boyle =

Irish rugby union player (born 1984)

- Born: 22 February 1984 (age 42) Limerick, Ireland
- Height: 1.85 m (6 ft 1 in)
- Weight: 88 kg (13.9 st; 194 lb)

Rugby union career
- Position: Wing
Amateur team(s)
Years	Team	Apps	(Points)
- Garryowen
Senior career
Years	Team	Apps	(Points)
2009	Munster	2	(10)

Ciarán O'Boyle (born 22 February 1984) is an Irish former rugby union player.

== Career ==
O'Boyle joined the Munster academy ahead of the 2005–06 season, and progressed to a development contract with the province ahead of the 2006–07 season. In 2007, O'Boyle was part of the Garryowen team that defeated Cork Constitution 16–15 in the All-Ireland League Division 1 final. He made his senior debut for Munster in their 28–14 win against Edinburgh on 22 February 2009, with O'Boyle scoring the try that clinched a bonus-point for the province. He also scored a try for Munster during his second appearance for the province in their 20–9 win against Newport Gwent Dragons on 7 March 2009, however, he also sustained a torn hamstring during the game, ruling him out for two months. Despite this setback, O'Boyle was promoted to a full contract for the 2009–10 season, but he was released by Munster at the end of that season and returned to the amateur club scene with Garryowen.
