= Diarmuid Barron =

Irish rugby union player (born 1998)

- Born: 6 August 1998 (age 28) New Inn, Cashel, Ireland
- Height: 1.85 m (6 ft 1 in)
- Weight: 103 kg (16.2 st; 227 lb)
- School: Rockwell College

Rugby union career
- Position: Hooker
Amateur team(s)
Years	Team	Apps	(Points)
- Cashel
2016–	Garryowen		
Senior career
Years	Team	Apps	(Points)
2018–	Munster	103	(55)
- Correct as of 26 September 2026
International career
Years	Team	Apps	(Points)
2017–2018	Ireland U20	9	(0)
2022	Emerging Ireland	3	(0)
2022	Ireland A	3	(0)
- Correct as of 05 February 2026

Diarmuid Barron (born 6 August 1998) is an Irish rugby union player who plays as a hooker for United Rugby Championship club Munster.

== Early life ==
Born in Cashel, County Tipperary, Barron captained Rockwell College, where former Munster number 8 Denis Leamy was coach, to victory in the 2015 Munster Schools Rugby Senior Cup.

== Munster ==
Barron joined the Munster Academy year one intake ahead of the 2018–19 season. He made his competitive debut for the senior Munster team on 21 September 2018, aged 19, coming off the bench to replace Mike Sherry in the provinces 2018–19 Pro14 fixture against Cardiff Blues. He scored his first try for the province in their 39–9 win against Welsh side Dragons on 28 September 2019, in Munster's opening 2019–20 Pro14 fixture. Barron was promoted from Munster's academy to their senior squad ahead of the 2020–21 season, and made his first start for the province in their 31–17 win against Italian side Benetton in round 16 of the 2020–21 Pro14 on 19 March 2021.

Barron signed a one-year contract extension with Munster in March 2021, and made his Champions Cup debut for Munster in their 2021–22 pool B round 2 fixture at home to French club Castres on 18 December 2021, coming on as a replacement for Niall Scannell in the province's 19–13 win. Barron signed a two-year contract extension in January 2022. He started and scored one try in Munster's historic 28–14 win against a South Africa XV in Páirc Uí Chaoimh on 10 November 2022, and earned his 50th cap for the province in their 49–42 win against Welsh side Scarlets in round 15 of the 2022–23 United Rugby Championship on 3 March 2023. He started and scored one try in Munster's 19–14 win against the Stormers in the final of the 2022–23 United Rugby Championship on 27 May 2023.

== Ireland ==
Barron was a late call-up to the Ireland under-20s squad for the 2017 World Rugby Under 20 Championship, and made his debut for the team in their tournament opener against Italy U20, though a thumb injury suffered just 20 minutes into the game ended Barron's tournament. He went on to represent Ireland under-20s during the 2018 Six Nations Under 20s Championship and 2018 World Rugby Under 20 Championship.

Barron was selected in the Emerging Ireland squad that travelled to South Africa to participate in the Toyota Challenge against Currie Cup teams Free State Cheetahs, Griquas and Pumas in September–October 2022. He featured as a replacement in Emerging Ireland's 54–7 opening win against Griquas on 30 September, started in the 28–24 win against the Pumas on 5 October, before featuring as a replacement again in the 21–14 win against the Cheetahs on 9 October.

Following the Toyota Challenge, Barron was also selected in the Ireland A panel that joined the senior Ireland team after round 7 of the 2022–23 United Rugby Championship to face an All Blacks XV on 4 November 2022; Barron featured as a replacement in Ireland A's 47–19 defeat.

== Honours ==
=== Rockwell College ===
- Munster Schools Rugby Senior Cup:
  - Winner (1): 2015

=== Munster ===
- United Rugby Championship
  - Winner (1): 2022–23
