= John Hodnett =

Irish rugby union player (born 1999)

- Born: 10 January 1999 (age 27) Rosscarbery, Ireland
- Height: 1.83 m (6 ft 0 in)
- Weight: 105 kg (16.5 st; 231 lb)
- School: Mount Saint Michael's
- University: University College Cork

Rugby union career
- Position: Back-row
Amateur team(s)
Years	Team	Apps	(Points)
- Clonakilty
- UCC
Senior career
Years	Team	Apps	(Points)
2020–	Munster	95	(90)
- Correct as of 17 October 2026
International career
Years	Team	Apps	(Points)
2019	Ireland U20	7	(10)
2022	Emerging Ireland	2	(0)
- Correct as of 9 October 2022

John Hodnett (born 10 January 1999) is an Irish rugby union player who plays as a flanker for United Rugby Championship club Munster.

== Early life and education ==
Born in Rosscarbery, County Cork, Hodnett attended Mount Saint Michael's and first began playing rugby with Clonakilty, only committing to the sport when selected for the Munster under-18s club's team, having previously also played Gaelic games. Hodnett is studying PE teaching and maths at University College Cork and spent time on a teaching placement at Limerick school St Munchin's College.

== Munster ==
Hodnett was selected to represent Munster A during the 2018–19 Celtic Cup, featuring in four of the provinces fixtures. Following his performances for Munster A and Ireland under-20s, Hodnett joined the Munster academy ahead of the 2019–20 season, and he made his senior competitive debut for the province in their 2019–20 Pro14 round 11 fixture against South African side Southern Kings in Irish Independent Park, Cork on 14 February 2020, with Hodnett starting at openside flanker. He scored a try and earned the Man-of-the-Match award in Munster's 68–3 win.

Having started the 2020–21 season with a series of impressive performances in the Pro14 for Munster, Hodnett sustained an achilles tendon injury during training in November 2020 which required surgery, ruling Hodnett out for the long-term. He joined the Munster senior squad on a two-year contract from the 2021–22 season. Having made his comeback from the achilles injury for UCC in the All-Ireland League in previous weeks, Hodnett made his comeback for Munster as a replacement in their 18–10 away defeat against Welsh side Ospreys in round 5 of the 2021–22 United Rugby Championship on 23 October 2021, and made his first start for the province in 13 months in their 35–14 away win against English club Wasps in round 1 of the 2021–22 Champions Cup on 12 December 2021, in a match that was also Hodnett's Champions Cup debut.

Hodnett signed a one-year contract extension with Munster in January 2022. He started in Munster's historic 28–14 win against a South Africa XV in Páirc Uí Chaoimh on 10 November 2022, and won the 2022–23 United Rugby Championship Tackle Machine award for his 96% tackle success rate during that season. He was player of the match and scored the winning try in Munster's 19–14 win against the Stormers in the final of the 2022–23 United Rugby Championship on 27 May 2023.

== Ireland ==
Selected in the Ireland under-20s squad for the 2019 Six Nations Under 20s Championship, Hodnett started the wins against England, Scotland, Italy, France, and Wales, as Ireland secured their first grand slam in the tournament since 2007. He was retained in the under-20s squad for the 2019 World Rugby Under 20 Championship when it was confirmed in May 2019, and started in the opening win against England and the defeat against Australia, before a knee injury brought an end to his participation in the tournament.

Hodnett was selected in the Emerging Ireland squad that travelled to South Africa to participate in the Toyota Challenge against Currie Cup teams Free State Cheetahs, Griquas and Pumas in September–October 2022. He featured as a replacement in Emerging Ireland's 54–7 opening win against Griquas on 30 September and started in the 21–14 win against the Cheetahs on 9 October.

== Honours ==
=== Munster ===
- United Rugby Championship
  - Winner (1): 2022–23

=== Ireland under-20s ===
- Six Nations Under 20s Championship:
  - Winner (1): 2019
- Grand Slam:
  - Winner (1): 2019
- Triple Crown:
  - Winner (1): 2019
