= Josh Wycherley =

Irish rugby union player (born 1999)

- Born: 22 July 1999 (age 27) Bantry, Ireland
- Height: 1.83 m (6 ft 0 in)
- Weight: 115 kg (18.1 st; 254 lb)
- School: Cistercian College
- Notable relative: Fineen Wycherley (brother)

Rugby union career
- Position: Prop
Amateur team(s)
Years	Team	Apps	(Points)
- Young Munster
Senior career
Years	Team	Apps	(Points)
2020–	Munster	93	(25)
- Correct as of 31 October 2026
International career
Years	Team	Apps	(Points)
2019	Ireland U20	10	(15)
2022	Emerging Ireland	3	(5)
- Correct as of 9 October 2022

Josh Wycherley (born 22 July 1999) is an Irish rugby union player who plays as a prop for United Rugby Championship club Munster.

== Early life ==
Born in Bantry, County Cork, Wycherley first began playing rugby with Bantry Bay RFC, and, like older brother Fineen, attended Cistercian College, Roscrea, before going on to represent Ireland at under-18 and under-19 level. He also played full forward in both hurling and football for St. Colum's.

== Munster ==
Though he wasn't included in the initial Munster academy intake ahead of the 2018–19 season, Wycherley was later added to the squad in December 2018, having made four appearances for Munster A in the 2018–19 Celtic Cup. Wycherley made his senior competitive debut for Munster in their 2020–21 Pro14 round 3 fixture against Welsh side Cardiff Blues on 26 October 2020, coming on as a replacement for James Cronin in the 69th minute in the provinces 38–27 win. He made his first start for Munster in their 28–16 win against Dragons on 1 November 2020, and Wycherley made his Champions Cup debut for the province in their opening fixture of the 2020–21 competition against English side Harlequins on 13 December 2020, coming on as a replacement in Munster's 21–7 home win.

Wycherley made his first start for Munster in their historic 39–31 away win against French side Clermont in round 2 of the 2020–21 Champions Cup on 19 December 2020, earning widespread praise for his performance against French veteran prop Rabah Slimani. He joined the senior squad on a two-year contract from the 2021–22 season, and scored his first try for the province in their 34–17 away win against Italian side Zebre Parma in round 11 of the 2021–22 United Rugby Championship on 29 January 2022. Wycherley signed a two-year contract extension with Munster in September 2022, and started in Munster's historic 28–14 win against a South Africa XV in Páirc Uí Chaoimh on 10 November 2022. He came on as a replacement in Munster's 19–14 win against the Stormers in the final of the 2022–23 United Rugby Championship on 27 May 2023.

== Ireland ==
Selected in the Ireland under-20s squad for the 2019 Six Nations Under 20s Championship, Wycherley started the wins against England, Scotland, Italy, France, against whom Wycherley scored two tries and won the Man-of-the-Match award, and Wales, as Ireland secured their first grand slam in the tournament since 2007. He was retained in the under-20s squad for the 2019 World Rugby Under 20 Championship when it was confirmed in May 2019.

Wycherley was selected in the Emerging Ireland squad that travelled to South Africa to participate in the Toyota Challenge against Currie Cup teams Free State Cheetahs, Griquas and Pumas in September–October 2022. He started and scored one try in Emerging Ireland's 54–7 opening win against Griquas on 30 September, before featuring as a replacement in the 28–24 win against the Pumas on 5 October and the 21–14 win against the Cheetahs on 9 October.

== Honours ==
=== Munster ===
- United Rugby Championship
  - Winner (1): 2022–23

=== Ireland under-20s ===
- Six Nations Under 20s Championship:
  - Winner (1): 2019
- Grand Slam:
  - Winner (1): 2019
- Triple Crown:
  - Winner (1): 2019
