= Fineen Wycherley =

Irish rugby union player

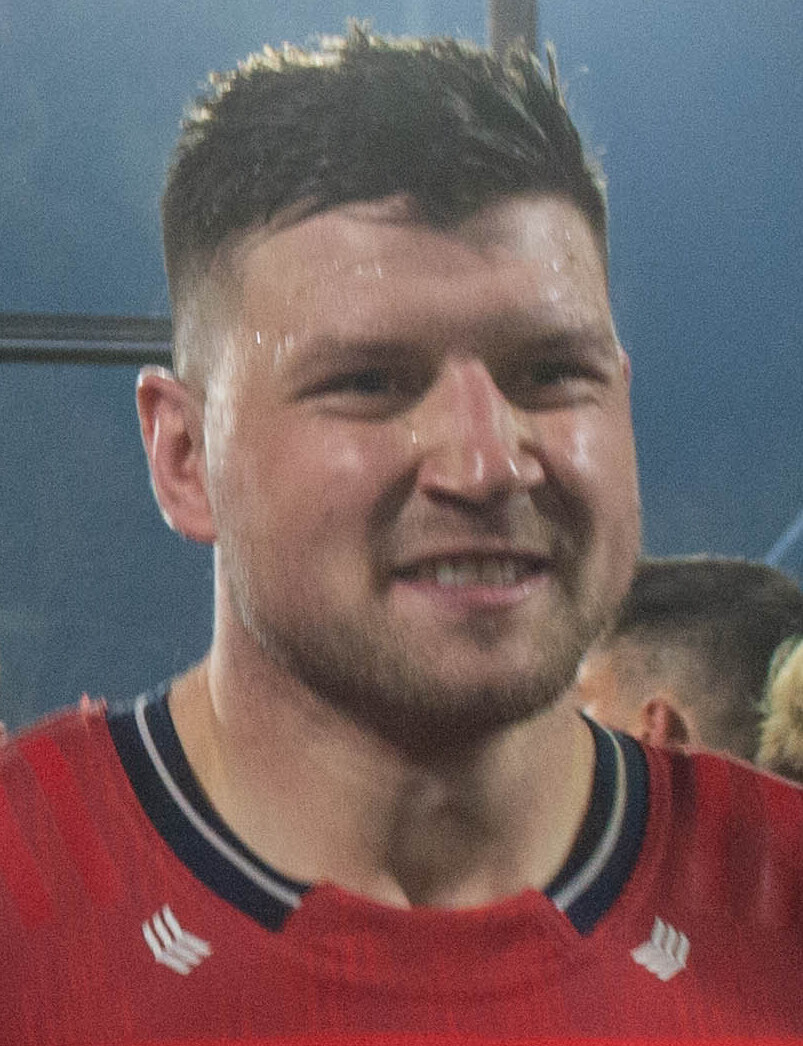
- Wycherley in 2022
- Born: 11 December 1997 (age 28) Bantry, Ireland
- Height: 1.95 m (6 ft 5 in)
- Weight: 116 kg (18.3 st; 256 lb)
- School: Cistercian College
- Notable relative: Josh Wycherley (brother)

Rugby union career
- Position(s): Lock, Flanker
Amateur team(s)
Years	Team	Apps	(Points)
2016–	Young Munster		
Senior career
Years	Team	Apps	(Points)
2017–	Munster	154	(45)
- Correct as of 31 October 2026
International career
Years	Team	Apps	(Points)
2017	Ireland U20	9	(5)
2021	Ireland	1	(0)
2026	Ireland A	1	(0)
- Correct as of 06 February 2026

Fineen Wycherley (born 11 December 1997) is an Irish rugby union player who plays as a lock for United Rugby Championship club Munster.

== Early life ==
Wycherley was born in Bantry, County Cork. At age 16, he moved to Cistercian College, Roscrea and was part of the team that won the Leinster Schools Rugby Senior Cup in 2015.

== Munster ==
Wycherley was an unused substitute in Munster's fixture against Welsh side Scarlets in Thomond Park on 24 February 2017. This was his first call-up to the senior Munster team in a United Rugby Championship fixture. On 4 March 2017, Wycherley made his competitive debut for Munster when he came on as a replacement in the 2016–17 Pro12 fixture against Cardiff Blues in Cardiff Arms Park. In Munster's 2017–18 Pro14 defeat against Glasgow Warriors on 22 September 2017, Wycherley was sent off. He was subsequently cited and banned for three weeks.

Wycherley signed a one-year development contract with Munster in January 2018, which saw him join the senior squad for the 2018–19 season. Wycherley won the 2018 John McCarthy Award for Academy Player of the Year in April 2018. He scored his first try for Munster during their 32–7 away win against Italian side Zebre during round 9 of the 2018–19 Pro14 on 25 November 2018. He signed a two-year contract extension with Munster in December 2018. Wycherley made his Champions Cup debut for Munster on 9 December 2018, featuring off the bench in their 30–5 win against French pool 2 opponents Castres.

Wycherley signed a two-year contract extension with Munster in March 2021, and signed a further two-year extension in October 2022.

== Ireland ==
Having been named in the training squad for the 2017 Six Nations Under 20 Championship in December 2016, Wycherley made his debut for Ireland U20 on 3 February 2017 when he started against Scotland U20 in his sides 19–20 away victory in Broadwood Stadium. On 10 February 2017, Wycherley again started for Ireland U20, this time in the sides 26–27 away victory against Italy U20 in Stadio Enrico Chersoni. On 17 March 2017, Wycherley started for Ireland U20 in their 10–14 defeat against England U20 in Donnybrook Stadium. Wycherley was also selected in the Ireland Under-20s squad for the 2017 World Rugby Under 20 Championship.

When head coach Andy Farrell announced the Ireland squad for their two remaining 2020 Six Nations Championship fixtures in October, delayed due to the COVID-19 pandemic, Wycherley was one of six players who, though not being called up to the squad, would train alongside it. Wycherley received his first international call up when named in the squad for Ireland's tests against Japan and the United States in July 2021, making his senior competitive debut as a replacement in the 71–10 win against the United States on 10 July 2021.

== Honours ==
=== Munster ===
- United Rugby Championship
  - Winner (1): 2022–23

== Statistics ==
=== International analysis by opposition ===
Against	Played	Won	Lost	Drawn	Tries	Points	% Won
United States	1	1	0	0	0	0	100
Total	1	1	0	0	0	0	100

Correct as of 10 July 2021
