= Jean Kleyn =

South African rugby union player (born 1993)

- Born: 26 August 1993 (age 33) Johannesburg, South Africa
- Height: 2.03 m (6 ft 8 in)
- Weight: 123 kg (19.4 st; 271 lb)
- School: Hoërskool Linden
- University: Stellenbosch University

Rugby union career
- Position: Lock
Youth career
- 2012–2014: Western Province
Senior career
Years	Team	Apps	(Points)
2014–2016	Western Province	24	(5)
2014–2016	Stormers	19	(0)
2016–2026	Munster	167	(80)
2026–	Gloucester	0	(0)
- Correct as of 25 April 2026
International career
Years	Team	Apps	(Points)
2019	Ireland	5	(0)
2023–	South Africa	10	(0)
- Correct as of 1 July 2026
Medal record
Men's Rugby union
Representing South Africa
Rugby World Cup
Gold medal – first place	2023 France	Squad

Jean Kleyn (born 26 August 1993) is a South African professional rugby union player who plays as a lock for PREM Rugby club Gloucester and the South Africa national team. Kleyn previously played for Ireland, having qualified on residency grounds.

After representing Ireland, he subsequently changed his national affiliation and made his debut for South Africa in 2023.

== Early Life ==
Kleyn first played provincial rugby for the Western Province U19s during the 2012 Under-19 Provincial Championship, also being promoted to the Western Province U21 side in the same season, as well as in 2013. He picked up two winner's medals, with Western Province ending both the 2012 Under-19 Provincial Championship and 2013 Under-21 Provincial Championship seasons as champions. As well as playing regularly for the senior side in 2014, he made a further three appearances in the 2014 Under-19 Provincial Championship.

== Club career ==
=== Western Province / Stormers ===
Kleyn was named in the 2013 and 2014 Vodacom Cup squads, but never made an appearance, suffering a knee injury in 2013 and an ankle injury in 2014.

He was included in the Stormers squad for the 2014 Super Rugby season. After missing the early part of the season with his ankle injury, Kleyn recovered to be named in the starting line-up for their match against the Bulls in Pretoria, but ended on the losing side as the home team won 28–12. A further three appearances off the bench followed in May 2014. In the second half of 2014, Kleyn was a key player for Western Province in the 2014 Currie Cup Premier Division, starting ten matches during the season. The final two of his starts came in their 31–23 semi-final victory over the Blue Bulls and the final, in which Kleyn played the entire 80 minutes, helping his side to a 19–16 victory over the Golden Lions to win his first senior trophy.

Kleyn established himself as a regular in the Stormers squad during the 2015 Super Rugby season, appearing in thirteen of their seventeen matches, including five starts. He helped the Stormers finish top of the South African Conference, and also played in their qualifier against the Brumbies, which they lost. He once again was a key player for a Western Province team attempting to retain their Currie Cup title in the 2015 competition, playing in all twelve matches, of which he started eleven. The team finished third on the log and Kleyn started their 23–18 victory over the Blue Bulls in the semi-final and the final, where his side could not emulate their 2014 result, losing 24–32 to the Golden Lions.

Kleyn suffered an arm injury in a warm-up match against the Jaguares prior to the 2016 Super Rugby season, which ruled him out of the start of the competition. Kleyn started two matches for Western Province in the 2016 Currie Cup qualification series, the first of those being a match against the Leopards during which Kleyn scored his first try in senior rugby, scoring ten minutes from time to help his side to a 43–34 victory. He was included in the Stormers touring squad for their trip to Australia to face the Rebels and the Force, but was not selected for either match. He eventually made his only appearance of the season in their 52–24 victory over the Southern Kings, their final match of the regular season.

=== Munster ===
Kleyn secured an early release from his contract with Western Province in July 2016, and joined irish side Munster on a three-year contract prior to the 2016–17 Pro12 season. On 3 September 2016, Kleyn made his competitive debut for Munster when he came on as a substitute against Scarlets in their opening Pro12 fixture. On 17 September 2016, Kleyn scored his first try for Munster in their 20–16 away win against Welsh side Dragons in Rodney Parade. The match was also his first start for the province. On 17 February 2017, it was announced that Kleyn had been ruled out for 8–10 weeks due to a neck injury, sustained during the United Rugby Championship fixture against Dragons on 10 February.

On 1 September 2017, in his return to competitive action following his neck injury, Kleyn scored two tries in Munster's win against Benetton in Round 1 of the 2017–18 Pro14. Kleyn scored a try and won the Man-of-the-Match award in Munster's 21–16 win against Ospreys on 16 September 2017. Kleyn was nominated for the 2018 Munster Rugby Player of the Year award in April 2018. He signed a three-year contract extension with Munster in September 2018. Kleyn was ruled out for six weeks after undergoing surgery for a thumb injury in November 2018. He returned from the injury in Munster's Pro14 fixture against Ulster on 21 December 2018. Kleyn made his 50th appearance for Munster in their 26–17 win against Leinster on 29 December 2018.

He signed a two-year contract extension with Munster in January 2022. He played his 100th game for Munster in their 34–17 away win against Zebre Parma in round 11 of the 2021–22 United Rugby Championship on 29 January 2022. Kleyn was selected in the 2021–22 United Rugby Championship dream team He started in Munster's 19–14 win against the Stormers in the final of the United Rugby Championship on 27 May 2023.

=== Gloucester ===
On 13 January 2026, after 10 seasons with Munster in Ireland, it was confirmed that Kleyn would join Gloucester in the English Premiership Rugby competition ahead of the 2026-27 season.

== International career ==
=== Ireland ===
Kleyn qualified through residency to play for Ireland on 8 August 2019, and was selected in Joe Schmidt's 44–man training squad for the 2019 Rugby World Cup. He made his debut for Ireland in their World Cup warm-up match against Italy on 10 August 2019, starting in the 29–10 win, and was selected in the 31-man Ireland squad for the 2019 Rugby World Cup, starting in Ireland's 35–0 win against Russia before featuring off the bench in a 47–5 win against Samoa in Ireland's final pool game,

=== South Africa ===
Kleyn was not selected in Ireland's training squad ahead of the 2023 World Cup. Having not played for Ireland for more than three years, he was also eligible for selection by his native South Africa, and he was invited to join their training camp ahead of the World Cup, following approval from World Rugby. Kleyn made his debut for South Africa when he started in their 43–12 win against Australia on 8 July 2023 in round one of the 2023 Rugby Championship, and was later selected in the 33-man squad for the World Cup.

== Statistics ==
=== International analysis by opposition ===
For Ireland

Against	Played	Won	Lost	Drawn	Tries	Points	% Won
England	1	0	1	0	0	0	0
Italy	1	1	0	0	0	0	100
Russia	1	1	0	0	0	0	100
Samoa	1	1	0	0	0	0	100
Wales	1	1	0	0	0	0	100
Total	5	4	1	0	0	0	80

For South Africa

Against	Played	Won	Lost	Drawn	Tries	Points	% Won
Argentina	1	1	0	0	0	0	100
Australia	1	1	0	0	0	0	100
Ireland	1	0	1	0	0	0	0
Italy	1	1	0	0	0	0	100
New Zealand	2	2	0	0	0	0	100
Romania	1	1	0	0	0	0	100
Wales	2	2	0	0	0	0	100
Total	9	8	1	0	0	0	88.89

Correct as of 29 November 2025

== Honours ==
=== South Africa ===
- Rugby World Cup
  - Winner (1): 2023

=== Munster ===
- United Rugby Championship
  - Winner (1): 2022–23

=== Western Province ===
- Currie Cup
  - Winner (1): 2014

=== Individual ===
- United Rugby Championship dream team:
  - Selected (1): 2021–22
