= 2017–18 Pro14 =

- Countries: Ireland; Italy; Scotland; South Africa; Wales
- Date: 1 September 2017 – 26 May 2018
- Champions: Leinster Rugby (5th title)
- Runners-up: Scarlets
- Matches played: 152
- Attendance: 1,301,321 (average 8,561 per match)
- Highest attendance: 62,338 – Judgement Day (28 April 2018)
- Lowest attendance: 1,000 – Zebre v Cardiff Blues (25 February 2018)
- Tries scored: 898 (average 5.9 per match)
- Top point scorer: John Cooney (Ulster) (160 points)
- Top try scorer: Barry Daly (Leinster) (12 tries)

Official website
- www.pro14rugby.org

The 2017–18 PRO14 (also known as the Guinness PRO14 for sponsorship reasons) was the seventeenth season of the professional rugby union competition originally known as the Celtic League. It is the first season to be referred to as the Guinness PRO14 Championship, with the addition of two South African teams.

Fourteen teams competed in this season — four Irish teams: Connacht, Leinster, Munster and Ulster; two Italian teams: Benetton and Zebre; two Scottish teams: Edinburgh and Glasgow Warriors; two South African teams: Cheetahs and the Southern Kings; and four Welsh teams: Cardiff Blues, Dragons, Ospreys and Scarlets.

Scarlets came into the new season as defending champions, and for the second season reached the PRO14 final. Leinster, however, won the final at the Aviva Stadium to take their fifth title in the competition's various iterations, and seal a domestic league and European Cup double, only the sixth team to do so, and the first from the PRO14 Championship.

== Teams ==
Location of Irish, Scottish and Welsh teams:	Location of Italian teams: Location of South African teams:
Conference A; Conference B; Champions.

Team	Coach / Director of Rugby	Captain	Stadium/s	Capacity
(Italy) Benetton	(New Zealand) Kieran Crowley	(Italy) Dean Budd	Stadio Comunale di Monigo	6,700
(Wales) Cardiff Blues	(England) Danny Wilson	(Wales) Gethin Jenkins	Cardiff Arms Park	12,125
(South Africa) Cheetahs	(South Africa) Rory Duncan	(South Africa) Francois Venter	Free State Stadium	48,000
(Ireland) Connacht	(New Zealand) Kieran Keane	(Ireland) John Muldoon	Galway Sportsgrounds	8,100
(Wales) Dragons	(Ireland) Bernard Jackman	(Wales) Cory Hill	Rodney Parade; Eugene Cross Park (Note: Dragons rugby opted to take a fixture 'on the road' again, similarly to their Cardiff Blues fixture last season, which took place in Caerphilly.)	8,700; 8,000
(Scotland) Edinburgh	(England) Richard Cockerill	(Scotland) Fraser McKenzie (Note: Magnus Bradbury was initially named a team captain at the start of the season, but was stripped of his captaincy due to off-field discipline issues.)	New Myreside; Murrayfield Stadium	5,500; 67,144 (Note: Although Murrayfield's full capacity is 67,144, only the lower section of the East Stand, with a capacity of 12,464, is generally opened for Edinburgh fixtures.)
(Scotland) Glasgow Warriors	(New Zealand) Dave Rennie	(Scotland) Ryan Wilson	Scotstoun Stadium	7,351
(Ireland) Leinster	(Ireland) Leo Cullen	(Fiji) Isa Nacewa	RDS Arena; Aviva Stadium	18,500; 51,700
(Ireland) Munster	(South Africa) Johann van Graan (Note: Having announced in June 2017 that Director of Rugby Rassie Erasmus would leave Munster midway through the season, Johann van Graan was named as his replacement in September. Van Graan started his appointment in November 2017 ahead of Round 9.)	(Ireland) Peter O'Mahony	Thomond Park; Irish Independent Park	25,600; 8,008
(Wales) Ospreys	(Ireland) Allen Clarke (Note: Ospreys came into the season with Steve Tandy in charge of the side. On 22 January, he was sacked following a poor run of results in the Pro14 and Europe. He was replaced by the then forwards coach, Allen Clarke.)	(Wales) Alun Wyn Jones	Liberty Stadium	20,827
(Wales) Scarlets	(New Zealand) Wayne Pivac	(Wales) Ken Owens	Parc y Scarlets	14,870
(South Africa) Southern Kings	(South Africa) Deon Davids	(South Africa) Mike Willemse	Nelson Mandela Bay Stadium; Wolfson Stadium; Outeniqua Park	48,459; 10,000; 7,500
(Ireland) Ulster	(New Zealand) Jono Gibbes (Note: Ulster started the season under Director of Rugby Les Kiss, but he left his post on 31 January 2018 by mutual agreement with the province. The head coach Jono Gibbes assumed all coaching responsibility of the team for the rest of the season.)	(Ireland) Rory Best	Kingspan Stadium	18,196
(Italy) Zebre	(Ireland) Michael Bradley	(Italy) George Biagi (Italy) Tommaso Castello	Stadio Sergio Lanfranchi; Stadio Tommaso Fattori	5,000; 10,000

== Changes for the season ==
1. On 18 May 2017, European Professional Club Rugby announced key changes to how PRO14 teams qualify for the European Rugby Champions Cup. At the end of the 2017–18 season, the top seven eligible teams qualified for the 2018–19 European Rugby Champions Cup, regardless of their country of origin (previously the seven qualifiers included at least one team from each of Ireland, Italy, Scotland and Wales). The two South African teams are not eligible to qualify for EPCR tournaments.
2. On 30 June 2017, BBC Wales reported that the two South African teams being dropped from the Super Rugby competition, the Cheetahs and Southern Kings, would be immediately added to Pro12. The two teams, the South African Rugby Union and Pro12 organiser Celtic Rugby Limited refused to comment on the report. However, their involvement was confirmed on 1 August 2017.

== Format ==
League Stage

The fourteen teams will be split into two conferences of seven teams, with each conference featuring two teams from Ireland and Wales plus one team from Italy, Scotland and South Africa. The regular season will be made up of 21 rounds –

- 12 home and away games against each team in their own conference
- 7 games, either home or away, against the teams in the other conference
- 2 additional regional derbies –
  - Each Irish team will play the two Irish teams in the other conference, one at home and one away
  - Each Welsh team will play the two Welsh teams in the other conference, one at home and one away
  - Each Italian team will play the Italian team in the other conference twice, home and away
  - Each Scottish team will play the Scottish team in the other conference twice, home and away
  - Each South African team will play the South African team in the other conference twice, home and away

League Play-Offs

The first-placed team in each conference are given a bye to the semi-finals with the second and third placed teams in each conference meeting in two quarter-finals for the two remaining semi-final places. This is the first year in which there will be two quarter-finals prior to the semi-finals and final.

Qualification For Champions Cup

The South African teams cannot compete in the European Rugby Champions Cup. The top three eligible teams in each conference automatically qualified for following year's Champions Cup. The fourth ranked eligible team in each conference met in a play-off match with the winner taking the seventh Champions Cup place.

== Team changes ==
=== Ireland ===
In February 2017, Connacht announced that New Zealander Kieran Keane, Chiefs attack coach, had signed a three-year contract to become their new head coach, replacing Pat Lam who moved to Bristol. Following Keane's appointment, existing forwards coach Jimmy Duffy signed an extension to his deal and academy manager Nigel Carolan was promoted to backs coach, leaving his post as head coach of the Ireland under-20s to take the role. In May 2017, Peter Wilkins joined from Edinburgh as defence coach.

In March 2017, Leinster confirmed that all four of their current coaches had extended their terms with the province. Head coach Leo Cullen, senior coach Stuart Lancaster, backs coach Girvan Dempsey and scrum coach John Fogarty signed contracts to take them through to summer 2019.

In June 2017, after many weeks of media speculation, Munster confirmed that director of rugby Rassie Erasmus and defence coach Jacques Nienaber would leave their roles with the province and return to South Africa on 31 December 2017, to take over the national team. In the same month coaches Jerry Flannery and Felix Jones extended their contracts with the province by two years, expanding their roles to forwards coach, and backline and attack coach respectively. Team manager Niall O'Donovan also signed a new three-year contract. Johann van Graan, the Springboks forwards coach, was named as the new head coach in September 2017, and started his appointment ahead of Round 9 of the tournament.

In February 2017, Ulster announced that New Zealander Jono Gibbes, former Leinster and then-Clermont Auvergne forwards coach, would be joining the province as their new head coach on a two-year contract working under existing director of rugby Les Kiss. It was also announced that former Wales and Lions scrum-half Dwayne Peel had joined as an assistant coach. In June 2017, Ulster added former Leinster hooker and Grenoble coach Aaron Dundon as their Scrum Coach. Kiss left his post on 31 January 2018 by mutual agreement with the province, with Gibbes assuming all coaching responsibility of the team for the remainder of the season.

=== Italy ===
Ahead of the new season, Benetton Treviso changed their name, becoming just Benetton. In July 2017, New Zealand-born flanker Dean Budd was named as team captain replacing Alessandro Zanni.

In July 2017, Zebre announced that a new company had been formed, named Zebre Rugby Club, to take the second Italian place in the Pro14 ahead of the 2017–18 season. This followed an earlier announcement from the Italian Rugby Federation that Zebre intended to withdraw from the league due to major financial complications. However, with the formation of the new company, the club will now remain in Parma. Former Connacht and Edinburgh coach Michael Bradley was appointed as Zebre's new head coach. In addition to the change of coach, Zebre saw a change to the captaincy with Tommaso Castello serving as co-captain with the previous season's skipper George Biagi.

=== Scotland ===
In February 2017, Edinburgh announced that former Leicester Tigers coach Richard Cockerill would be taking over as their new director of rugby from the start of the season. Then acting head coach Duncan Hodge returned to his usual role of Backs Coach. Magnus Bradbury was named as the new team captain at the start of the season, replacing the joint captains from the previous season, Grant Gilchrist and Stuart McInally. Bradbury was stripped of his captaincy in October 2017 due to off-field discipline issues, and replaced in the role by Fraser McKenzie.

In August 2016, Glasgow Warriors announced that Dave Rennie, then coach of Super Rugby side Chiefs, would replace Gregor Townsend as head coach from the beginning of the 2017–18 season. This followed the news that Townsend was leaving the club to become the Scottish national team's new head coach. Scottish international Ryan Wilson was announced as the side's new captain in August 2017, replacing Jonny Gray and Henry Pyrgos.

=== South Africa ===
On 1 August 2017, it was announced that the Cheetahs and the Southern Kings would join the Pro12, forming the Pro14. They join following their removal from the Southern Hemisphere Super Rugby competition.

Cheetahs' coaching structure was altered following the move north, with Rory Duncan becoming the team's head coach and Franco Smith taking on the role of director of rugby. During the 2017 Super Rugby season the roles had been reversed. The move will see Duncan take charge of the first team, with Smith focusing on development of junior players and coaches, which will allow him to remain involved with South Africa at international level. The Cheetahs are captained by Niell Jordaan.

Southern Kings preparation for the season was disrupted by the loss of a number of players prior to the confirmation of the side's admission to the competition. Among the players lost was regular captain Lionel Cronje. To fill out the squad, a number of players were signed on loan deals from South African Super Rugby sides. On 28 August, head coach Deon Davids appointed hooker Mike Willemse as the team's captain for their first ever tour in the competition.

=== Wales ===
In August 2017, Cardiff Blues added former players Nicky Robinson and Richie Rees to their backroom staff. They join as kicking coach and backs coach respectively.

On 20 June 2017, it was announced that, following a vote in March 2017 to allow the takeover of the club and Rodney Parade by the Welsh Rugby Union, Newport Gwent Dragons would be dropping "Newport Gwent" from its name and would be known simply as Dragons with immediate effect. A new crest was also unveiled. This followed the replacement of Kingsley Jones as head coach with Bernard Jackman earlier in the month. In August 2017, South African Hendré Marnitz, then head coach of Currie Cup side Blue Bulls, was confirmed as the Dragons' defence coach for the upcoming season. In the same month, Barry Maddocks was appointed as the Dragons' skills coach.

Ospreys came into the season with Steve Tandy as head coach. Tandy was sacked in January 2018, following a poor run of results in the league and in Europe. The team's forwards coach, former Ulster and Ireland player Allen Clarke, was named as his replacement on an interim basis for the remainder of the season.

Champions Scarlets came into the season largely unchanged. Their most significant loss was Wales and Lions fullback Liam Williams, who joined Saracens in the Premiership. Fellow Lion, Leigh Halfpenny was signed from Toulon as a replacement.

== Table ==
2017–18 Pro14 tables
Conference A
	Team	P	W	D	L	PF	PA	PD	TF	TA	TBP	LBP	PTS
1	(Scotland) Glasgow Warriors (SF)	21	15	1	5	614	366	+248	81	38	12	2	76
2	(Ireland) Munster (SF)	21	13	1	7	568	361	+207	78	42	10	5	69
3	(South Africa) Cheetahs (QF)	21	12	0	9	609	554	+55	75	68	10	5	63
4	(Wales) Cardiff Blues	21	11	0	10	502	482	+20	56	59	5	5	54
5	(Wales) Ospreys	21	9	0	12	390	487	−97	44	60	5	3	44
6	(Ireland) Connacht	21	7	0	14	445	477	−32	53	54	5	6	39
7	(Italy) Zebre	21	7	0	14	408	593	–185	50	78	4	4	36
Conference B
	Team	P	W	D	L	PF	PA	PD	TF	TA	TBP	LBP	PTS
1	(Ireland) Leinster (CH)	21	14	1	6	601	374	+227	83	46	10	2	70
2	(Wales) Scarlets (RU)	21	14	1	6	528	365	+163	69	43	9	3	70
3	(Scotland) Edinburgh (QF)	21	15	0	6	494	375	+119	62	44	7	1	68
4	(Ireland) Ulster (PO)	21	12	2	7	538	482	+56	68	61	8	2	62
5	(Italy) Benetton	21	11	0	10	415	451	−36	51	55	6	5	55
6	(Wales) Dragons	21	2	2	17	378	672	−294	43	94	4	4	20
7	(South Africa) Southern Kings	21	1	0	20	378	829	−451	48	119	4	3	11
If teams are level at any stage, tiebreakers are applied in the following order -: 1. number of matches won 2. the difference between points for and points against 3. the number of tries scored 4. the most points scored 5. the difference between tries for and tries against 6. the fewest red cards received 7. the fewest yellow cards received
Green background indicates teams that competed in the Pro14 play-offs, and also earned a place in the 2018–19 European Champions Cup (excluding South African teams who are ineligible); Blue background indicates teams outside the play-off places that earned a place in the 2018–19 European Champions Cup, including the winner of the play-off between the two fourth-ranked European teams in each conference Yellow background indicates the loser of the play-off between the two fourth-ranked European teams in each conference, that earned a place in the 2018–19 European Rugby Challenge Cup. Plain background indicates teams that earned a place in the 2018–19 European Rugby Challenge Cup. (CH) Champions. (RU) Runners-up. (SF) Losing semi-finalists. (QF) Losing quarter-finalists. (PO) Champions Cup play-off winners.

== Match summary ==
2017–18 Pro14 match summary
Home / Away		Conference A							Conference B						
Home / Away		BLU	CHE	CON	GLA	MUN	OSP	ZEB	BEN	DRA	EDI	KIN	LEI	SCA	ULS
Conference A	BLU	—	25–20	36–30	19–20	25–18	23–26	37–8	31–25	43–29	10–20			11–14	35–17
Conference A	CHE	29–27	—	26–25	26–29	17–19	44–25	54–39			33–13	45–24	38–19	28–21	
Conference A	CON	15–17	23–15	—	12–18	20–16	26–15	11–19			22–29	32–10	47–10		44–16
Conference A	GLA	40–16	37–23	35–22	—	37–10	31–10	68–7	37–21		17–0	43–13	31–21		
Conference A	MUN	39–16	51–18	39–13	21–10	—	36–10	33–5	34–3	49–6			24–34	19–7	24–24
Conference A	OSP	29–28	27–26	39–10	6–47	16–21	—	22–13		28–14		26–12	32–18	18–19	
Conference A	ZEB	7–10	23–24	24–10	20–40	19–36	37–14	—	16–20	34–32				10–41	27–23
Conference B	BEN		27–21	19–22			16–6	27–14	—	29–27	13–24	31–3	10–36	22–12	14–21
Conference B	BEN		27–21	19–22			16–6	17–22	—	29–27	13–24	31–3	10–36	22–12	14–21
Conference B	DRA	17–22	17–29	21–8	15–15		9–22		15–18	—	12–25	29–13	16–39	8–33	32–32
Conference B	EDI				18–17	12–6	37–10	16–15	17–20	35–18	—	37–7	29–24	52–14	20–32
Conference B	EDI				24–19	12–6	37–10	16–15	17–20	35–18	—	37–7	29–24	52–14	20–32
Conference B	KIN	12–45	21–45			22–39		17–43	35–36	45–13	21–48	—	10–31	30–34	36–43
Conference B	KIN	12–45	20–29			22–39		17–43	35–36	45–13	21–48	—	10–31	30–34	36–43
Conference B	LEI	37–9		21–18		23–17		41–6	15–17	54–10	21–13	64–7	—	20–13	38–7
Conference B	SCA	30–17		36–27	26–8		12–9		20–8	47–13	28–8	57–10	10–10	—	34–10
Conference B	ULS		42–19	16–8	36–15	24–17	8–0		23–22	52–25	16–17	59–10	10–25	27–20	—

== Conference stage ==
All times are local.

=== Round 1 ===
1 September 2017
19:35

(1 BP) Munster (Ireland)	34–3	(Italy) Benetton
Try: Kleyn (2) 8' c, 48' c Bleyendaal 13' m Sweetnam 26' m Wootton 30' m A. Conway 34' m Con: Bleyendaal (2/6) 9', 49'	Report	Pen: Banks (1/1) 19'

Irish Independent Park
Attendance: 7,854
Referee: Ian Davies (WRU)

1 September 2017
19:35

Cardiff Blues (Wales)	10–20	(Scotland) Edinburgh
Try: Navidi 35' c Con: Evans (1/1) 36'; Pen: Evans (1/1) 47'	Report	Try: Kinghorn 11' c Dean 56' c Con: Weir (2/2) 12', 58'; Pen: Weir (2/2) 27', 51'

Cardiff Arms Park
Attendance: 6,145
Referee: George Clancy (IRFU)

1 September 2017
19:35

(1 BP) Ulster (Ireland)	42–19	(South Africa) Cheetahs
Try: Bowe 18' m O'Connor 26' c McCloskey 29' c Piutau 32' m Ludik 41' m Nelson 74' c Con: Cooney (2/5) 27', 30'; Nelson (1/1) 75'; Pen: Cooney (2/2) 8', 55'	Report	Try: Blommetjies 15' c Mapimpi 20' c Petersen 49' m Con: Small-Smith (2/3) 17', 22'

Kingspan Stadium
Attendance: 14,448
Referee: Andrew Brace (IRFU)

2 September 2017
14:30

Ospreys (Wales)	22–13	(Italy) Zebre
Try: Giles (2) 2' m, 78' c Fia 40' c Con: Hook (1/2) 40'; S. Davies (1/1) 78'; Pen: Hook (1/1) 20'	Report	Try: Canna 69' c Con: Canna (1/1) 71'; Pen: Canna (2/3) 8', 41'

Liberty Stadium
Attendance: 6,826
Referee: Quinton Immelman (SARU)

2 September 2017
15:15

Dragons (Wales)	16–39	(Ireland) Leinster (1 BP)
Try: Penalty try 73'; Pen: Henson (3/3) 10', 33', 44'	Report	Try: Gibson-Park 22' c Penalty try 41'; Larmour 46' m Leavy 65' c Marsh 75' c Con: R. Byrne (2/3) 23', 65'; Marsh (1/1) 76'; Pen: R. Byrne (2/2) 16', 39'

Rodney Parade
Attendance: 6,133
Referee: Mike Adamson (SRU)

2 September 2017
17:30

(1 BP) Scarlets (Wales)	57–10	(South Africa) Southern Kings
Try: McNicholl (2) 8' m, 73' c Halfpenny 22' c Patchell 46' c Ball 50' c Phillips 62' c Parkes 69' c S. Evans 77' c Con: Halfpenny (3/4) 23', 47', 51'; Patchell (4/4) 63', 69', 74', 78'; Pen: Halfpenny (1/1) 36'	Report	Try: Penxe 11' c Con: Coleman (1/1) 12'; Pen: Coleman (1/1) 34'

Parc y Scarlets
Attendance: 9,108
Referee: Frank Murphy (IRFU)

2 September 2017
19:35

(1 BP) Connacht (Ireland)	12–18	(Scotland) Glasgow Warriors
Pen: J. Carty (4/4) 1', 19', 40', 60'	Report	Try: Price 47' c L. Jones 71' m Con: P. Horne (1/2) 48'; Pen: P. Horne (2/3) 11', 45'

Galway Sportsgrounds
Attendance: 4,017
Referee: Ben Whitehouse (WRU)

=== Round 2 ===
8 September 2017
19:35

(1 BP) Leinster (Ireland)	37–9	(Wales) Cardiff Blues
Try: Tracy 32' c Cronin 67' c B. Daly 73' c McCarthy 75' c Con: R. Byrne (4/4) 33', 68', 74', 76'; Pen: R. Byrne (3/5) 40', 44', 59'	Report	Pen: Shingler (3/3) 15', 27', 41'

RDS Arena
Attendance: 13,535
Referee: Andrew Brace (IRFU)

8 September 2017
19:35

(1 BP) Edinburgh (Scotland)	35–18	(Wales) Dragons
Try: Kinghorn 29' c Hidalgo-Clyne 46' c Rasolea 68' m Fruean 75' c Con: Weir (3/4) 30', 47', 76'; Pen: Weir (3/3) 22', 26', 66'	Report	Pen: Henson (5/5) 10', 40', 54', 59', 64'; Drop: Henson (1/1) 14'

Myreside Stadium
Attendance: 3,324
Referee: Stuart Berry (SARU)

9 September 2017
15:15

(1 BP) Glasgow Warriors (Scotland)	31–10	(Wales) Ospreys
Try: Dunbar (2) 15' c, 77' c Sarto 51' c Ashe 59' c Con: Russell (4/4) 16', 53', 60', 78'; Pen: Russell (1/1) 18'	Report	Try: Evans 21' c Con: S. Davies (1/1) 21'; Pen: S. Davies (1/2) 40'

Scotstoun Stadium
Attendance: 7,351
Referee: Marius Mitrea (FIR)

9 September 2017
18:05

(1 BP) Benetton (Italy)	14–21	(Ireland) Ulster
Try: Ruzza 64' c, McKinley 70' c Con: McKinley (2/2) 65', 72'	Report	Try: Trimble (2) 8' c, 23' c Stockdale 60' c Con: Cooney (3/3) 9', 24', 61'

Stadio Comunale di Monigo
Attendance: 2,600
Referee: Dan Jones (WRU)

9 September 2017
17:15

(1 BP) Munster (Ireland)	51–18	(South Africa) Cheetahs
Try: O'Donnell 6' c Wootton (4) 19' c, 34' m, 54' m, 60' c Kleyn 48' m Farrell 50' c Zebo 71' m Con: Keatley (4/8) 7', 20', 50', 61'; Pen: Keatley (1/1) 3'	Report	Try: Small-Smith 41' m H. Venter 80' c Con: Petzer (1/2) 80'; Pen: Petzer (2/2) 15', 24'

Thomond Park
Attendance: 15,144
Referee: Ben Whitehouse (WRU)

9 September 2017
19:35

(1 BP) Connacht (Ireland)	32–10	(South Africa) Southern Kings
Try: Farrell 14' c E. Masterson 33' c Dillane 40' c Leader 69' m Con: J. Carty (3/3) 15', 34', 40'; Pen: J. Carty (2/2) 26', 47'	Report	Try: B. Klaasen 31' m Pupuma 77' m

Galway Sportsgrounds
Attendance: 5,104
Referee: Mike Adamson (SRU)

9 September 2017
20:35

Zebre (Italy)	10–41	(Wales) Scarlets (1 BP)
Try: Bellini 78' c Con: Canna (1/1) 79'; Pen: Canna (1/2) 3'	Report	Try: McNicholl 9' c S. Evans 48' c Asquith 63' m Beirne 69' c A. Davies 75' c Con: Patchell (4/5) 10', 48', 70', 76'; Pen: Patchell (2/2) 5', 27'

Stadio Sergio Lanfranchi
Attendance: 2,800
Referee: David Wilkinson (IRFU)

=== Round 3 ===
15 September 2017
19:30

Dragons (Wales)	21–8	(Ireland) Connacht
Try: Amos 1' m Dee 18' c Con: Henson (1/2) 19'; Pen: Henson (3/4) 23', 27', 36'	Report	Try: Roux 52' m Pen: J. Carty (1/1) 6'

Rodney Parade
Attendance: 5,069
Referee: Quinton Immelman (SARU)

15 September 2017
19:35

(1 BP) Edinburgh (Scotland)	17–20	(Italy) Benetton
Try: Dean (2) 17' c, 24' c Con: Weir (2/2) 19', 25'; Pen: Weir (1/2) 55'	Report	Try: Esposito (2) 28' c, 51' c Con: McKinley (2/2) 29', 52'; Pen: McKinley (2/2) 39', 47'

Myreside Stadium
Attendance: 3,395
Referee: David Wilkinson (IRFU)

15 September 2017
19:35

Ulster (Ireland)	27–20	(Wales) Scarlets (1 BP)
Try: Stockdale 63' m Andrew 75' c Con: Lealiifano (1/1) 77'; Pen: Cooney (4/4) 18', 31', 33', 51'; Lealiifano (1/1) 71'	Report	Try: McNicholl 60' c J. Davies 67' c Con: Halfpenny (2/2) 62', 68'; Pen: Halfpenny (2/2) 3', 57'

Kingspan Stadium
Attendance: 12,712
Referee: Marius Mitrea (FIR)

16 September 2017
14:15

Southern Kings (South Africa)	10–31	(Ireland) Leinster (1 BP)
Try: Nel 75' c Con: Dukisa (1/1) 76'; Pen: Banda (1/1) 3'	Report	Try: Reid 8' c O'Loughlin 42' m Conan 47' c Carbery 51' c D. Kearney 71' m Con: R. Byrne (3/5) 9', 48', 53'

Nelson Mandela Bay Stadium
Attendance: 3,011
Referee: Ben Whitehouse (WRU)

16 September 2017
15:15

(1 BP) Ospreys (Wales)	16–21	(Ireland) Munster
Try: Hook 11' c Con: S. Davies (1/1) 12'; Pen: S. Davies (3/3) 43', 56', 63'	Report	Try: Kleyn 19' c Sweetnam 36' m Con: Bleyendaal (1/2) 20'; Pen: Bleyendaal (3/5) 9', 50', 76'

Liberty Stadium
Attendance: 7,302
Referee: Stuart Berry (SARU)

16 September 2017
19:30

(1 BP) Cheetahs (South Africa)	54–39	(Italy) Zebre (1 BP)
Try: Mapimpi (2) 18' m, 44' c Small-Smith 27' c Obi 31' c Van Jaarsveld (2) 51' c, 59' c Meyer 66' c Petersen 72' c Con: Stapelberg (7/8) 28', 32', 46', 52', 60', 67', 73'	Report	Try: Biagi 15' m Meyer 36' c Bellini 56' c Afamasaga 63' c Bisegni 78' c Con: Canna (1/2) 37'; Violi (2/2) 57', 64'; Palazzani (1/1) 79'; Pen: Canna (2/4) 2', 9'

Toyota Stadium
Attendance: 13,982
Referee: Andrew Brace (IRFU)

16 September 2017
19:35

(1 BP) Cardiff Blues (Wales)	19–20	(Scotland) Glasgow Warriors
Try: James 7' c Con: Shingler (1/1) 8'; Pen: Shingler (4/5) 12', 25', 41', 47'	Report	Try: Pyrgos 30' c L. Jones 42' c Con: Russell (2/2) 31', 43'; Pen: Russell (2/2) 16', 67'

Cardiff Arms Park
Attendance: 5,374
Referee: Frank Murphy (IRFU)

=== Round 4 ===
22 September 2017
20:00

(1 BP) Cheetahs (South Africa)	38–19	(Ireland) Leinster
Try: Small-Smith 36' c Van Jaarsveld 43' m Nché 55' c Obi 80' c Con: Stapelberg (3/4) 37', 56', 80'; Pen: Stapelberg (4/4) 1', 9', 19', 25'	Report	Try: B. Daly (3) 5' m, 59' c, 72' c Con: R. Byrne (2/3) 60', 73'

Toyota Stadium
Attendance: 6,980
Referee: Mike Adamson (SRU)

22 September 2017
20:35

Benetton (Italy)	16–6	(Wales) Ospreys
Try: Minto 1' c Con: McKinley (1/1) 2'; Pen: McKinley (2/2) 10', 23'; Banks (1/1) 78'	Report	Pen: Biggar (1/1) 5'; S. Davies (1/1) 29'

Stadio Comunale di Monigo
Attendance: 3,500
Referee: George Clancy (IRFU)

22 September 2017
19:35

(1 BP) Glasgow Warriors (Scotland)	37–10	(Ireland) Munster
Try: Sarto 3' c L. Jones 35' c Grigg 44' c Cummings 62' c Con: Russell (4/4) 4', 37', 45', 64'; Pen: Russell (3/3) 9', 34', 55'	Report	Try: R. Scannell 14' m Farrell 47' m

Scotstoun Stadium
Attendance: 7,351
Referee: Nigel Owens (WRU)

22 September 2017
19:35

(1 BP) Ulster (Ireland)	52–25	(Wales) Dragons
Try: McCloskey 2' m Nelson 11' c Penalty try 19'; Timoney (2) 24' c, 48' c Herbst 28' c Stockdale 43' m Shanahan 62' c Con: Nelson (4/6) 12', 25', 29', 49'; Herron (1/1) 63'	Report	Try: Buckley 34' c Blacker 56' c Talbot-Davies 79' m Con: Jones (1/1) 34'; O'Brien (1/2) 57'; Pen: Jones (2/2) 6', 15'

Kingspan Stadium
Attendance: 12,291
Referee: Dan Jones (WRU)

23 September 2017
15:15

(1 BP) Connacht (Ireland)	15–17	(Wales) Cardiff Blues
Try: Leader 59' m Delahunt 74' c Con: Leader (1/1) 75'; Pen: Ronaldson (1/1) 10'	Report	Try: Halaholo (2) 37' c, 77' c Con: Shingler (1/1) 38'; Evans (1/1) 79'; Pen: Shingler (1/1) 63'

Galway Sportsgrounds
Attendance: 4,659
Referee: Marius Mitrea (FIR)

23 September 2017
19:35

Southern Kings (South Africa)	17–43	(Italy) Zebre (1 BP)
Try: Masimla 50' c Pupuma 56' c Con: De Wet (2/2) 52', 57'; Pen: De Wet (1/1) 9'	Report	Try: Castello 3' c Bellini 4' m Giammarioli 20' c Boni 47' c Bisegni 66' c Sarto 78' c Con: Canna (4/5) 3', 22', 48', 67'; Bordoli (1/1) 79'; Pen: Canna (1/1) 27'

Nelson Mandela Bay Stadium
Attendance: 4,062
Referee: Sean Gallagher (IRFU)

23 September 2017
19:35

(1 BP) Scarlets (Wales)	28–8	(Scotland) Edinburgh
Try: Patchell 19' c G. Davies 30' c Kruger 46' c Shingler 62' c Con: Halfpenny (4/4) 21', 32', 47', 63'	Report	Try: Harries 38' m Pen: Weir (1/1) 35'

Parc y Scarlets
Attendance: 8,088
Referee: John Lacey (IRFU)

=== Round 5 ===
29 September 2017
17:00

(1 BP) Cheetahs (South Africa)	44–25	(Wales) Ospreys
Try: Van Jaarsveld (2) 7' m, 18' c Mapimpi (2) 39' c, 69' m Schoeman 56' c Venter 80' c Con: Stapelberg (3/5) 19', 40', 57'; Small-Smith (1/1) 80'; Pen: Stapelberg (2/2) 10', 50'	Report	Try: Webb 23' c Fonotia 31' c Evans 72' m Con: Biggar (2/3) 24', 32'; Pen: Biggar (2/2) 38', 47'

Toyota Stadium
Attendance: 4,589
Referee: Frank Murphy (IRFU)

29 September 2017
19:35

(1 BP) Glasgow Warriors (Scotland)	37–21	(Italy) Benetton
Try: Seymour 9' c Harley 25' c P. Horne 53' c Johnson 80' c Con: P. Horne (3/3) 9', 25', 54'; Thomson (1/1) 80'; Pen: P. Horne (2/2) 16', 49'; Thomson (1/1) 71'	Report	Try: Lazzaroni 56' m Ruzza 67' c Con: Banks (1/2) 68'; Pen: Banks (3/4) 22', 28', 40'

Scotstoun Stadium
Attendance: 7,351
Referee: Dan Jones (WRU)

29 September 2017
19:35

Leinster (Ireland)	21–13	(Scotland) Edinburgh
Try: Murphy 11' c Carbery 40' c Gibson-Park 73' c Con: Sexton (2/2) 13', 40'; R. Byrne (1/1) 74'	Report	Try: Tovey 29' c Con: Tovey (1/1) 30'; Pen: Tovey (2/2) 4', 10'

RDS Arena
Attendance: 13,213
Referee: Ian Davies (WRU)

29 September 2017
19:35

(1 BP) Scarlets (Wales)	36–27	(Ireland) Connacht
Try: McNicholl 7' c S. Evans 17' m Patchell 24' c Halfpenny 38' c Beirne 77' c Con: Halfpenny (4/5) 8', 26', 39', 79'; Pen: Halfpenny (1/2) 57'	Report	Try: J. Carty 9' c O'Halloran (2) 30' c, 73' m Kelleher 35' m Con: J. Carty (2/4) 10', 31'; Pen: J. Carty (1/2) 22'

Parc y Scarlets
Attendance: 7,693
Referee: Nigel Owens (WRU)

30 September 2017
13:30

(1 BP) Munster (Ireland)	39–16	(Wales) Cardiff Blues
Try: Murray 12' c Ryan 51' c Hanrahan (2) 55' c, 71' c Copeland 67' c Con: Keatley (4/5) 13', 52', 56', 68'; Pen: Keatley (2/2) 28', 35'	Report	Try: Turnbull 23' c Con: Evans (1/1) 24'; Pen: Evans (3/3) 7', 19', 30'

Thomond Park
Attendance: 13,558
Referee: Quinton Immelman (SARU)

30 September 2017
15:35

Zebre (Italy)	27–23	(Ireland) Ulster (1 BP)
Try: Licata 47' c Bellini 52' c Giammarioli 71' c Con: Canna (1/1) 49'; Violi (2/2) 53', 73'; Pen: Canna (2/4) 3', 21'	Report	Try: Trimble 16' c Cave 78' c Con: Cooney (1/1) 18'; Cave (1/1) 78' c Pen: Cooney (3/3) 32', 39', 62'

Stadio Sergio Lanfranchi
Attendance: 3,100
Referee: Mike Adamson (SRU)

30 September 2017
19:35

(1 BP) Dragons (Wales)	29–13	(South Africa) Southern Kings
Try: Amos (2) 5' c, 36' c Dee (2) 32' m, 41' c Con: Henson (3/4) 6', 38', 43'; Pen: Henson (1/2) 15'	Report	Try: Ntsila 56' c Con: De Wet (1/1) 57'; Pen: De Wet (2/2) 3', 20'

Rodney Parade
Attendance: 5,299
Referee: Andrew Brace (IRFU)

=== Round 6 ===
6 October 2017
19:35

(1 BP) Cardiff Blues (Wales)	43–29	(Wales) Dragons (1 BP)
Try: Dacey 6' c Morgan (2) 44' c, 72' c James 60' m Cuthbert 65' c Evans 69' c Con: Evans (5/6) 7', 45', 66', 70', 73'; Pen: Evans (1/2) 25'	Report	Try: Warren 2' c Dee 10' c Gasson 31' c Fairbrother 79' m Con: Henson (3/3) 3', 11', 32'; Pen: Henson (1/1) 48'

Cardiff Arms Park
Attendance: 8,178
Referee: Nigel Owens (WRU)

6 October 2017
20:35

(1 BP) Cheetahs (South Africa)	26–29	(Scotland) Glasgow Warriors (1 BP)
Try: Petersen 11' c Specman 39' c Con: Stapelberg (2/2) 12', 40'; Pen: Stapelberg (4/4) 28', 57', 65', 75'	Report	Try: Gibbins (2) 32' c, 52' c Pyrgos 69' c Harley 76' m Con: Russell (3/4) 33', 54', 70'; Pen: Russell (1/1) 2'

Toyota Stadium
Attendance: 5,964
Referee: George Clancy (IRFU)

6 October 2017
19:35

Edinburgh (Scotland)	16–15	(Italy) Zebre (1 BP)
Try: McInally 28' c Con: Weir (1/1) 28'; Pen: Tovey (1/1) 8'; Weir (2/2) 56', 69'	Report	Try: Meyer 20' m Violi 61' c Con: Violi (1/1) 62'; Pen: Violi (1/1) 67'

Myreside Stadium
Attendance: 3,674
Referee: Marius Mitrea (FIR)

6 October 2017
19:35

Ulster (Ireland)	16–8	(Ireland) Connacht
Try: Stockdale 56' c Con: Cooney (1/1) 56'; Pen: Cooney (3/3) 28', 44', 53'	Report	Try: McCartney 35' m Pen: J. Carty (1/1) 49'

Kingspan Stadium
Attendance: 14,363
Referee: Andrew Brace (IRFU)

7 October 2017
14:00

Leinster (Ireland)	23–17	(Ireland) Munster (1 BP)
Try: O'Loughlin (2) 16' c, 34' c Con: Sexton (2/2) 17', 35'; Pen: Sexton (1/1) 43', 51, 54'	Report	Try: Keatley 26' c Earls (2) 47' m, 79' m Con: Keatley (1/1) 27'

Aviva Stadium
Attendance: 46,374
Referee: Ben Whitehouse (WRU)

7 October 2017
20:00

(1 BP) Benetton (Italy)	31–3	(South Africa) Southern Kings
Try: Esposito (2) 31' m, 74' m Barbini 45' m Traorè 80' c Con: McKinley (1/2) 80'; Pen: Banks (3/3) 10', 21', 25'	Report	Pen: De Wet (1/1) 38'

Stadio Comunale di Monigo
Attendance: 4,700
Referee: Sean Gallagher (IRFU)

7 October 2017
19:35

(1 BP) Ospreys (Wales)	18–19	(Wales) Scarlets
Pen: Biggar (6/) 16', 34', 41', 47', 56', 66'	Report	Try: G. Davies (2) 42' m, 50' c Lee 61' c Con: Patchell (2/3) 50', 62'

Liberty Stadium
Attendance: 12,093
Referee: John Lacey (IRFU)

=== Round 7 ===
27 October 2017
19:35

(1 BP) Ospreys (Wales)	28–14	(Wales) Dragons
Try: Biggar 23' m Parry 33' m Leonard 63' m Fia 70' c Con: Biggar (1/4) 70'; Pen: Biggar (2/2) 37', 42'	Report	Try: Brown 29' c Dee 51' c Con: Henson (2/2) 30', 52'

Liberty Stadium
Attendance: 7,442
Referee: Ian Davies (WRU)

27 October 2017
19:35

(1 BP) Glasgow Warriors (Scotland)	43–13	(South Africa) Southern Kings
Try: Hogg 1' m Matawalu 31' c Grigg 34' c Fagerson 58' m M. Smith 65' c G. Horne 71' c Turner 80' c Con: Hastings (2/4) 32', 34'; Jackson (3/3) 66', 72', 80'	Report	Try: Nel 75' c Con: Zono (1/1) 75'; Pen: Banda (2/2) 12', 21'

Scotstoun Stadium
Attendance: 7,351
Referee: Mike Adamson (SRU)

27 October 2017
19:35

Connacht (Ireland)	20–16	(Ireland) Munster (1 BP)
Try: O'Halloran 22' c Farrell 66' c Con: J. Carty (1/1) 22'; Ronaldson (1/1) 67'; Pen: J. Carty (2/3) 39', 50'	Report	Try: Zebo 3' c Con: Keatley (1/1) 4'; Pen: Keatley (2/2) 16', 30'; Hanrahan (1/1) 65'

Galway Sportsgrounds
Attendance: 7,089
Referee: Nigel Owens (WRU)

28 October 2017
15:00

Benetton (Italy)	13–24	(Scotland) Edinburgh
Try: Esposito 54' c Con: McKinley (1/1) 56'; Pen: McKinley (2/3) 35, 40'	Report	Try: Hidalgo-Clyne 3' c Fife (2) 58' c, 72' c Con: Tovey (3/3) 4', 59', 73'; Pen: Tovey (1/2) 63'

Stadio Comunale di Monigo
Attendance: 4,000
Referee: Ben Whitehouse (WRU)

28 October 2017
18:30

Ulster (Ireland)	10–25	(Ireland) Leinster
Try: Reidy 27' c Con: Lealiifano (1/1) 28'; Pen: Lealiifano (1/1) 6'	Report	Try: Larmour 15' c L. McGrath (2) 58' m, 78' c Con: R. Byrne (1/2) 15'; Marsh (1/1) 78'; Pen: R. Byrne (2/3) 30', 37'

Kingspan Stadium
Attendance: 17,631
Referee: John Lacey (IRFU)

28 October 2017
20:00

(1 BP) Zebre (Italy)	23–24	(South Africa) Cheetahs
Try: Minozzi 17' c Fabiani 53' c Con: Canna (2/2) 18', 54'; Pen: Canna (3/3) 9', 14', 27'	Report	Try: Mapimpi (2) 6' m, 58' c Con: Zeilinga (1/1) 60'; Pen: Stapelberg (3/3) 3', 44', 49'; Zeilinga (1/2) 80'

Stadio Sergio Lanfranchi
Attendance: 3,000
Referee: Dan Jones (WRU)

28 October 2017
19:35

(1 BP) Scarlets (Wales)	30–17	(Wales) Cardiff Blues
Try: Parkes 6' m Elias 32' c J. Evans 60' m S. Evans 69' c Con: Halfpenny (1/2) 34'; Patchell (1/2) 70'; Pen: Halfpenny (2/2) 1', 14'	Report	Try: Halaholo 52' c L. Williams 58' c Con: Shingler (2/2) 53', 59'; Pen: Evans (1/1) 5'

Parc y Scarlets
Attendance: 9,003
Referee: Stuart Berry (SARU)

=== Round 8 ===
3 November 2017
19:35

(1 BP) Glasgow Warriors (Scotland)	31–21	(Ireland) Leinster
Try: G. Horne (2) 6', 21' c Grigg (2) 14' c, 23' c Con: P. Horne (4/4) 8', 15', 21', 24'; Pen: P. Horne (1/1) 33'	Report	Try: Gibson-Park 4' c O'Loughlin 10' c A. Byrne 46' c Con: R. Byrne (3/3) 5', 12', 47'

Scotstoun Stadium
Attendance: 7,351
Referee: Stuart Berry (SARU)

3 November 2017
19:35

(1 BP) Munster (Ireland)	49–6	(Wales) Dragons
Try: R. Scannell 20' c Zebo 28' c O'Donoghue 47' c Sweetnam 57' c Arnold (2) 63' c, 77' c O'Byrne 69' c Con: Hanrahan (7/7) 21', 30', 48', 58', 64', 70', 78'	Report	Pen: O'Brien (2/2) 24', 41'

Irish Independent Park
Attendance: 8,008
Referee: Mike Adamson (SRU)

3 November 2017
19:35

Scarlets (Wales)	20–8	(Italy) Benetton
Try: D. Jones 12' c Williams 67' c Con: D. Jones (2/2) 13', 68'; Pen: D. Jones (2/2) 4', 32'	Report	Try: McKinley 43' m Con: McKinley (1/1) 16'

Parc y Scarlets
Attendance: 8,007
Referee: George Clancy (IRFU)

4 November 2017
15:00

(2 BP) Southern Kings (South Africa)	36–43	(Ireland) Ulster (1 BP)
Try: B. Klaasen (2) 3' m, 62' c Penxe (2) 6' c, 73' c Makase 28' c Con: Zono (3/4) 7', 29', 63'; Coleman (1/1) 74'; Pen: Zono (1/1) 23'	Report	Try: Reidy 18' m Andrew (2) 26' m, 49' m Cooney 53' c Trimble 68' c Ross 72' c Diack 75' c Con: Cooney (1/4) 54'; Lealiifano (3/3) 69', 72', 76'

Wolfson Stadium
Attendance: 2,836
Referee: Quinton Immelman (SARU)

4 November 2017
17:30

(1 BP) Edinburgh (Scotland)	37–10	(Wales) Ospreys
Try: Kinghorn 28' c Fowles 41' c Tovey 54' c Bradbury 80' c Con: Tovey (4/4) 29', 42', 55', 80'; Pen: Tovey (3/4) 16', 31', 36'	Report	Try: Arhip 11' c Con: S. Davies (1/1) 12'; Pen: S. Davies (1/1) 22'

Myreside Stadium
Attendance: 3,793
Referee: Andrew Brace (IRFU)

4 November 2017
19:35

(1 BP) Cardiff Blues (Wales)	37–8	(Italy) Zebre
Try: L. Williams 5' m Halaholo 19' c Rees 50' m Morgan 61' c James 66' c Con: Shingler (3/5) 20', 62', 68'; Pen: Shingler (2/2) 24', 28'	Report	Try: Palazzani 75' m Pen: Canna (1/1) 9'

Cardiff Arms Park
Attendance: 5,381
Referee: Sean Gallagher (IRFU)

4 November 2017
19:35

Connacht (Ireland)	23–15	(South Africa) Cheetahs
Try: Adeolokun 12' c McCartney 48' c Con: Ronaldson (1/1) 13'; J. Carty (1/1) 49'; Pen: Ronaldson (2/3) 5', 29'; Crosbie (1/1) 73'	Report	Try: S. Venter 67' m Mapimpi 75' c Con: Zeilinga (1/2) 76'; Pen: Stapelberg (1/2) 40'

Galway Sportsgrounds
Attendance: 6,012
Referee: Frank Murphy (IRFU)

=== Round 9 ===
24 November 2017
17:30

(1 BP) Cheetahs (South Africa)	33–13	(Scotland) Edinburgh
Try: Barry 26' c Bernardo 36' c Pokomela 59' c Mapimpi 73' m Meyer 80' c Con: Zeilinga (4/5) 27', 37', 60', 80'	Report	Try: Hidalgo-Clyne 47' c Con: Hidalgo-Clyne (1/1) 47'; Pen: Hidalgo-Clyne (2/2) 43', 49'

Toyota Stadium
Attendance: 3,648
Referee: Quinton Immelman (SARU)

24 November 2017
19:05

Ulster (Ireland)	23–22	(Italy) Benetton (1 BP)
Try: Bowe 17' c Trimble 77' c Con: Cooney (1/1) 18'; Lealiifano (1/1) 78'; Pen: Cooney (2/3) 22', 31'; Lealiifano (1/1) 63'	Report	Try: Barbieri 55' c Con: Allan (1/1) 57'; Pen: Allan (4/5) 4', 12', 38', 51'; Banks (1/1) 72'

Kingspan Stadium
Attendance: 14,544
Referee: Mike Adamson (SRU)

24 November 2017
19:35

Cardiff Blues (Wales)	36–30	(Ireland) Connacht (2 BP)
Try: Robinson 17' c Morgan 52' c Lane 60' c Con: Evans (1/1) 18'; Anscombe (2/2) 53', 61'; Pen: Evans (3/3) 15', 23', 37'; Anscombe (2/2) 73', 80'	Report	Try: Adeolokun 29' c Delahunt (2) 55' m, 70' m Muldoon 75' c Con: J. Carty (1/2) 30'; Crosbie (1/2) 76'; Pen: J. Carty (2/2) 12', 33'

Cardiff Arms Park
Attendance: 5,042
Referee: Craig Evans (WRU)

24 November 2017
19:35

(1 BP) Leinster (Ireland)	54–10	(Wales) Dragons
Try: Gibson-Park 17' c Nacewa (2) 27' c, 51' c J. Murphy 31' c Deegan 32' c Penalty try 48'; Larmour 70' c O'Loughlin 75' m Con: R. Byrne (5/5) 17', 28', 31', 34', 53'; Marsh (1/2) 70'	Report	Try: Benjamin 11' c Con: Henson (1/1) 12'; Drop: Henson (1/1) 2'

RDS Arena
Attendance: 10,354
Referee: Sam Grove-White (SRU)

26 November 2017
13:00

Ospreys (Wales)	6–47	(Scotland) Glasgow Warriors (1 BP)
Pen: S. Davies (2/2) 2', 29'	Report	Try: Hastings 13' c G. Horne (2) 26' c, 53' c Cummings 42' m Turner 46' c Thomson 76' c Sarto 80' c Con: Hastings (6/7) 13', 27', 47', 54', 77', 80'

Liberty Stadium
Attendance: 4,362
Referee: Ian Davies (WRU)

26 November 2017
13:00

(2 BP) Southern Kings (South Africa)	30–34	(Wales) Scarlets (1 BP)
Try: Makase 9' m Penxe 16' m Du Toit 41' c H. Klaasen 65' c Con: Zono (1/3) 42'; Coleman (1/1) 66'; Pen: Zono (2/2) 25', 40'	Report	Try: Beirne 4' c Nicholas 50' c Kruger 56' c D. Jones 69' c Con: D. Jones (4/4) 5', 52', 57', 70'; Pen: D. Jones (2/2) 34', 61'

Nelson Mandela Bay Stadium
Attendance: 3,619
Referee: Stuart Berry (SARU)

26 November 2017
13:30

Zebre (Italy)	19–36	(Ireland) Munster (1 BP)
Try: Bisegni 35' c Sarto 40' c Venditti 68' m Con: Palazzani (2/3) 36', 40'	Report	Try: R. Scannell 17' c Hart 24' c Wootton (2) 51' m, 55' c Nash 80' c Con: Hanrahan (4/5) 18', 25', 56', 80'; Pen: Hanrahan (1/3) 9'

Stadio Sergio Lanfranchi
Attendance: 2,500
Referee: Lloyd Linton (SRU)

=== Round 10 ===
1 December 2017
19:15

Southern Kings (South Africa)	21–48	(Scotland) Edinburgh (1 BP)
Try: H. Klaasen 21' c Van Schalkwyk 80' m Con: Coleman (1/1) 23'; Pen: Coleman (3/3) 12', 29', 38'	Report	Try: McKenzie 2' c Mata 5' m Gilchrist 18' c Fife 59' m Hidalgo-Clyne (3) 70' c, 72' c, 77' c Con: Van der Walt (2/4) 4', 19'; Hidalgo-Clyne (3/3) 70', 73', 77'; Pen: Van der Walt (1/1) 10'

Nelson Mandela Bay Stadium
Attendance: 3,600
Referee: Stuart Berry (SARU)

1 December 2017
19:35

(1 BP) Glasgow Warriors (Scotland)	40–16	(Wales) Cardiff Blues
Try: Johnson 18' c Dunbar 31' c Jackson 54' c Vunisa 67' c Sarto 76' m Matawalu 79' c Con: P. Horne (5/6) 19', 32', 55', 67', 80'	Report	Try: Cook 6' c Con: Evans (1/1) 8'; Pen: Evans (3/3) 1', 22', 47'

Scotstoun Stadium
Attendance: 7,351
Referee: Nigel Owens (WRU)

1 December 2017
19:35

(1 BP) Dragons (Wales)	32–32	(Ireland) Ulster (1 BP)
Try: Screech 19' c Hewitt (2) 27' m, 77' m Belcher 66' m O'Brien 71' c Con: Henson (2/5) 20', 72'; Pen: Henson (1/1) 24'	Report	Try: Gilroy (2) 9' m, 54' c Penalty try 32'; L. Marshall 41' m Lealiifano 80' m Con: Lealiifano (1/4) 56'; Pen: Lealiifano (1/1) 4'

Rodney Parade
Attendance: 4,477
Referee: Marius Mitrea (FIR)

2 December 2017
14:15

Zebre (Italy)	24–10	(Ireland) Connacht
Try: Meyer 67' c Venditti 76' m Con: Canna (1/2) 68'; Pen: Canna (3/4) 10', 40', 61'; Drop: Canna (1/1) 74'	Report	Try: Farrell 43' c Con: Crosbie (1/1) 44'; Pen: J. Carty (1/2) 66'

Stadio Sergio Lanfranchi
Attendance: 2,000
Referee: George Clancy (IRFU)

2 December 2017
16:30

Benetton (Italy)	10–36	(Ireland) Leinster (1 BP)
Try: Brex 56' c Con: Allan (1/1) 57'; Pen: Allan (1/1) 8'	Report	Try: Lowe (2) 16' c, 68' c Murphy 32' c Ringrose 60' c L. McGrath 64' m Con: R. Byrne (4/5) 17', 33', 61', 70'; Pen: R. Byrne (1/1) 25'

Stadio Comunale di Monigo
Attendance: 2,700
Referee: David Wilkinson (IRFU)

2 December 2017
17:30

(1 BP) Munster (Ireland)	36–10	(Wales) Ospreys
Try: Arnold 17' c Sweetnam 22' c Cloete 29' c R. Scannell 42' c O'Donoghue 55' m Con: Keatley (4/5) 18', 23', 30', 43'; Pen: Keatley (1/1) 4'	Report	Try: Hassler 38' m W. Jones 70' m

Irish Independent Park
Attendance: 8,008
Referee: Ben Whitehouse (WRU)

2 December 2017
19:35

Cheetahs (South Africa)	28–21	(Wales) Scarlets (1 BP)
Try: Small-Smith 24' c Barry (2) 58' c, 67' m Con: Zeilinga (2/3) 25', 59'; Pen: Zeilinga (3/4) 6', 15', 34'	Report	Try: JA. Davies 36' m Nicholas 62' c Con: D. Jones (1/2) 62'; Pen: D. Jones (2/2) 4', 18'; Prydie (1/1) 75'

Toyota Stadium
Attendance: 3,457
Referee: Quinton Immelman (SARU)

=== Round 11 ===
23 December 2017
15:00

(1 BP) Benetton (Italy)	27–14	(Italy) Zebre
Try: Esposito (2) 17' m, 63' m Faiva 41' c Gori 69' c Con: Banks (1/3) 41'; McKinley (1/1) 71'; Pen: Banks (1/1) 47'	Report	Try: Bisegni 49' m Pen: Violi (1/1) 32'; Canna (2/2) 44', 60'

Stadio Comunale di Monigo
Attendance: 4,000
Referee: Marius Mitrea (FIR)

23 December 2017
19:35

(1 BP) Connacht (Ireland)	44–16	(Ireland) Ulster
Try: E. Masterson 2' m Aki 7' c O'Halloran 24' m Dillane (2) 54' c, 75' c Butler 59' c Con: J. Carty (4/6) 8', 56', 61', 76'; Pen: J. Carty (2/2) 40', 47'	Report	Try: Gilroy 65' m Lyttle 79' m Pen: Cooney (2/2) 23', 32'

Galway Sportsgrounds
Attendance: 7,629
Referee: Mike Adamson (SRU)

26 December 2017
14:00

(1 BP) Dragons (Wales)	17–22	(Wales) Cardiff Blues
Try: Fairbrother 64' c Penalty try 73'; Con: Henson (1/1) 65'; Pen: Henson (1/2) 39'	Report	Try: Summerhill 35' m Lee-Lo 50' c James 59' c Con: Anscombe (2/3) 51', 60'; Pen: Anscombe (1/3) 27'

Rodney Parade
Attendance: 8,722
Referee: Andrew Brace (IRFU)

26 December 2017
15:15

(1 BP) Munster (Ireland)	24–34	(Ireland) Leinster (1 BP)
Try: Murray 17' m Keatley 45' c Conway (2) 48' c, 76' m Con: Keatley (2/3) 46', 49'	Report	Try: Leavy 8' c Penalty try 20'; Henshaw 22' c Larmour 69' c Con: R. Byrne (3/3) 9', 24', 70'; Pen: R. Byrne (2/2) 1', 12'

Thomond Park
Attendance: 26,267
Referee: Nigel Owens (WRU)

26 December 2017
17:35

Scarlets (Wales)	12–9	(Wales) Ospreys (1 BP)
Try: S. Evans 17' m Macleod 80' c Con: Halfpenny (1/2) 80'	Report	Pen: S. Davies (3/3) 36', 50', 61'

Parc y Scarlets
Attendance: 14,509
Referee: Ian Davies (WRU)

==== 1872 Cup 1st round ====
23 December 2017
17:10

Edinburgh (Scotland)	18–17	(Scotland) Glasgow Warriors (1 BP)
Try: Fowles 60' c Dean 78' m Con: Van der Walt (1/2) 61'; Pen: Hidalgo-Clyne (2/2) 17', 50'	Report	Try: H. Jones 1' c Cummings 55' c Con: P. Horne (1/1) 2'; Russell (1/1) 56'; Pen: P. Horne (1/1) 47'

Murrayfield Stadium
Attendance: 23,833
Referee: Frank Murphy (IRFU)

=== Round 12 ===
30 December 2017
15:00

(1 BP) Zebre (Italy)	16–20	(Italy) Benetton
Try: Bellini 49' c Con: Violi (1/1) 50'; Pen: Canna (2/3) 2', 39'; Violi (1/1) 67'	Report	Try: Hayward 44' c Budd 69' c Con: Banks (1/1) 46'; McKinley (1/1) 70'; Pen: Banks (2/2) 7', 34'

Stadio Sergio Lanfranchi
Attendance: 4,000
Referee: David Wilkinson (IRFU)

31 December 2017
15:15

(1 BP) Cardiff Blues (Wales)	11–14	(Wales) Scarlets
Try: E. Jenkins 20' m Pen: Anscombe (2/2) 7', 28'	Report	Try: Prydie 12' c Patchell 43' c Con: Halfpenny (2/2) 14', 45'

Cardiff Arms Park
Attendance: 11,700
Referee: George Clancy (IRFU)

31 December 2017
17:35

Dragons (Wales)	9–22	(Wales) Ospreys
Pen: Robson (3/3) 7', 24', 34'	Report	Try: Baldwin 4' c Allen 11' m S. Davies 56' c Con: Biggar (2/3) 5', 57'; Pen: Biggar (1/1) 30'

Rodney Parade
Attendance: 5,519
Referee: Dan Jones (WRU)

1 January 2018
15:15

Leinster (Ireland)	21–18	(Ireland) Connacht (1 BP)
Try: Deegan 28' m L. McGrath 60' c Con: Sexton (1/2) 61'; Pen: Sexton (3/3) 6', 25', 49'	Report	Try: Bealham 38' c Healy 68' m Con: J. Carty (1/2) 39'; Pen: J. Carty (2/2) 1', 34'

RDS Arena
Attendance: 17,112
Referee: Ben Whitehouse (WRU)

1 January 2018
17:35

(1 BP) Ulster (Ireland)	24–17	(Ireland) Munster (1 BP)
Try: Cave 57' c Gilroy (2) 61' m, 73' c Lyttle 79' m Con: Cooney (2/4) 58', 74'	Report	Try: N. Scannell (2) 13' m, 24' m Penalty try 33'

Kingspan Stadium
Attendance: 17,594
Referee: Sean Gallagher (IRFU)

==== 1872 Cup 2nd round ====
30 December 2017
15:15

Glasgow Warriors (Scotland)	17–0	(Scotland) Edinburgh
Try: L. Jones 80' m Pen: Russell (4/4) 5', 42', 57', 73'	Report

Scotstoun Stadium
Attendance: 7,351
Referee: Mike Adamson (SRU)

=== Round 13 ===
5 January 2018
19:35

(1 BP) Scarlets (Wales)	47–13	(Wales) Dragons
Try: JA. Davies 16' c Prydie 27' m D. Jones 30' c A. Davies 51' c Shingler 53' c Boyde 61' c G.R. Jones 65' c Con: D. Jones (4/5) 17', 31', 51', 54'; Patchell (2/2) 63', 66'	Report	Try: Pretorius 73' c Con: O'Brien (1/1) 74'; Pen: Robson (1/1) 13'; Meyer (1/2) 37'

Parc y Scarlets
Attendance: 9,347
Referee: Marius Mitrea (FIR)

5 January 2018
19:35

(1 BP) Edinburgh (Scotland)	37–7	(South Africa) Southern Kings
Try: Gilchrist 27' m Kinghorn 30' c Van der Merwe 57' c Fenton 70' c Fife 78' m Con: Van der Walt (3/5) 31', 58', 70'; Pen: Van der Walt (2/2) 21', 49'	Report	Try: Dukisa 73' c Con: Dukisa (1/1) 75'

Myreside Stadium
Attendance: 3,300
Referee: Lloyd Linton (SRU)

6 January 2018
14:15

(1 BP) Benetton (Italy)	27–21	(South Africa) Cheetahs (1 BP)
Try: Ioane 38' m Faiva 58' m Ruzza (2) 62' c, 67' c Con: Banks (2/4) 62', 69'; Pen: Banks (1/2) 44'	Report	Try: Mohojé (2) 45' c, 77' m Con: Zeilinga (1/1) 47'; Pen: Zeilinga (3/3) 8', 17', 31'

Stadio Comunale di Monigo
Attendance: 3,500
Referee: Frank Murphy (IRFU)

6 January 2018
15:15

(1 BP) Ospreys (Wales)	29–28	(Wales) Cardiff Blues (1 BP)
Try: Hassler 21' c Webb (2) 25' c, 51' c Tipuric 62' m Con: Biggar (3/4) 22', 26', 52'; Pen: Biggar (1/1) 33'	Report	Try: N. Williams 16' m Lane 70' c Smith 74' c Con: Anscombe (2/3) 71', 75'; Pen: Anscombe (3/3) 1', 24', 31'

Liberty Stadium
Attendance: 7,489
Referee: Nigel Owens (WRU)

6 January 2018
16:30

Zebre (Italy)	20–40	(Scotland) Glasgow Warriors (1 BP)
Try: Giammarioli 9' c Mbanda 42' m D'Apice 60' m Con: Canna (1/2) 10'; Pen: Violi (1/1) 33'	Report	Try: Fagerson 6' c L. Jones (2) 20' c, 53' c Penalty try 28'; G. Horne 40' m Grigg 62' c Con: Russell (4/5) 7', 20', 54', 63'

Stadio Sergio Lanfranchi
Attendance: 2,000
Referee: Andrew Brace (IRFU)

6 January 2018
17:35

(1 BP) Leinster (Ireland)	38–7	(Ireland) Ulster
Try: Larmour (2) 5' c, 66' m B. Daly 15' m McFadden (2) 47' c, 51' c Sexton 81' c Con: R. Byrne (3/4) 6', 48', 53'; Sexton (1/2) 82'	Report	Try: Stockdale 72' c Con: Cooney (1/1) 74'

RDS Arena
Attendance: 17,373
Referee: George Clancy (IRFU)

6 January 2018
19:45

(1 BP) Munster (Ireland)	39–13	(Ireland) Connacht
Try: O'Shea 19' c Conway 53' c Earls 59' m Murray (2) 63' c, 69' c Con: Keatley (4/5) 20', 54', 64', 70'; Pen: Keatley (2/2) 30', 50'	Report	Try: McCartney 77' c Con: Ronaldson (1/1) 78'; Pen: J. Carty (2/2) 2', 24'

Thomond Park
Attendance: 18,604
Referee: David Wilkinson (IRFU)

=== South African derbies ===
These are round 11 and round 12 matches which are scheduled after the normal round dates.

13 January 2018
17:00

Southern Kings (South Africa)	21–45	(South Africa) Cheetahs (1 BP)
Try: Penxe 7' c Bredenkamp 52' c Penalty try 70'; Con: Zono (2/2) 9', 53'	Report	Try: Blommetjies 5' c Lee (3) 19' c, 42' c, 73' c S. Venter 31' c Du Toit 76' c Con: Zeilinga (6/6) 6', 20', 32', 43', 74', 77'; Pen: Zeilinga (1/1) 13'

Nelson Mandela Bay Stadium
Attendance: 6,711
Referee: Stuart Berry (SARU)

20 January 2018
17:00

(1 BP) Cheetahs (South Africa)	45–24	(South Africa) Southern Kings
Try: Lee (2) 19' c, 34' c Cassiem 25' c Nché 44' c Mapimpi 48' c S. Venter 52' c Con: Zeilinga (6/6) 21', 26', 34', 45', 49', 53'; Pen: Zeilinga (1/1) 3'	Report	Try: Vulindlu 10' c Ferreira 31' c Burger 72' c Con: Dukisa (2/2) 11', 32'; Van Rensburg (1/1) 72'; Pen: Dukisa (1/1) 36'

Toyota Stadium
Attendance: 5,522
Referee: Quinton Immelman (SARU)

=== Round 14 ===
9 February 2018
19:35

Connacht (Ireland)	26–15	(Wales) Ospreys
Try: E. Masterson 40' c Farrell 68' c Con: Ronaldson (2/2) 40', 69'; Pen: Ronaldson (4/5) 9', 23' 53', 75'	Report	Try: Howells 18' m Morgan-Williams 71' c Con: S. Davies (1/2) 72'; Pen: S. Davies (1/3) 62'

Galway Sportsgrounds
Attendance: 5,242
Referee: Stuart Berry (SARU)

9 February 2018
19:35

Dragons (Wales)	15–15	(Scotland) Glasgow Warriors
Try: Belcher 1' m Rosser 37' c Con: Kirchner (1/2) 38'; Pen: Kirchner (1/2) 36'	Report	Try: Thomson 14' m G. Horne 23' c Con: Hastings (1/1) 24'; Pen: Hastings (1/1) 19'

Rodney Parade
Attendance: 4,159
Referee: Andrew Brace (IRFU)

9 February 2018
19:35

(1 BP) Edinburgh (Scotland)	29–24	(Ireland) Leinster (2 BP)
Try: Crosbie 12' c Fowles 15' m McCallum 40+2' m Van der Merwe 59' m Bennett 78' c Con: Van der Walt (1/2) 13'; Hidalgo-Clyne (1/2) 79'	Report	Try: Deegan 3' c Fardy 24' c B. Daly (2) 33' m, 64' m Con: R. Byrne (2/4) 5', 25'

Myreside Stadium
Attendance: 3,930
Referee: Paul Williams (NZR)

9 February 2018
19:35

(1 BP) Ulster (Ireland)	59–10	(South Africa) Southern Kings
Try: Gilroy (3) 6' c, 38' c, 54' m McCloskey 17' c McPhillips 42' c Lyttle (2) 49' c, 58' m Treadwell 73' c Cave 76' c Con: Cooney (7/9) 7', 18', 39', 43', 50', 74', 77'	Report	Try: H. Klaasen 70' c Con: Van Rensburg (1/1) 70'

Kingspan Stadium
Attendance: 13,759
Referee: Joy Neville (IRFU)

10 February 2018
19:35

Cardiff Blues (Wales)	25–20	(South Africa) Cheetahs (1 BP)
Try: Lee-Lo 17' c E. Jenkins 24' m N. Williams 53' c Con: Evans (2/3) 18', 54'; Pen: Evans (2/3) 36', 69'	Report	Try: Nché 4' c Cassiem 56' c Con: Zeilinga (2/2) 4', 57'; Pen: Zeilinga (2/2) 14', 44'

Cardiff Arms Park
Attendance: 4,703
Referee: Ian Davies (WRU)

10 February 2018
19:35

(1 BP) Munster (Ireland)	33–5	(Italy) Zebre
Try: Arnold (2) 25' m, 73' c Scott 36' c Copeland 55' c R. Scannell 57' c Con: Hanrahan (1/2) 37'; Keatley (3/3) 56', 58', 74'	Report	Try: Palazzani 52' m

Thomond Park
Attendance: 13,412
Referee: Ben Whitehouse (WRU)

11 February 2018
13:05

(1 BP) Benetton (Italy)	22–12	(Wales) Scarlets
Try: Ioane (3) 24' m, 37' m, 50' c Zanon 65' m Con: Tebaldi (1/2) 52'	Report	Try: Baldwin 62' c Beirne 76' m Con: Jones (1/2) 63'

Stadio Comunale di Monigo
Attendance: 3,000
Referee: David Wilkinson (IRFU)

=== Round 15 ===
16 February 2018
19:35

Connacht (Ireland)	11–19	(Italy) Zebre
Try: Leader 72' m Pen: Ronaldson (2/3) 16', 40'	Report	Try: Giammarioli 18' c Di Giulio 46' m De Marchi 64' c Con: Canna (2/3) 19', 65'

Galway Sportsgrounds
Attendance: 5,400
Referee: Mike Adamson (SRU)

16 February 2018
19:35

(1 BP) Glasgow Warriors (Scotland)	37–23	(South Africa) Cheetahs
Try: Matawalu 12' c Jackson 19' m Halanukonuka 50' m G. Horne 57' c Pyrgos 68' c Con: Hastings (3/5) 13', 58', 69'; Pen: Hastings (2/2) 34', 67'	Report	Try: Jaer 8' c Blommetjies 63' c Con: Marais (2/2) 9', 64'; Pen: Marais (3/3) 40', 45', 53'

Scotstoun Stadium
Attendance: 7,351
Referee: George Clancy (IRFU)

16 February 2018
19:35

(1 BP) Ospreys (Wales)	26–12	(South Africa) Southern Kings
Try: Habberfield 12' c Penalty try (2) 65', 76'; Hassler 78' m Con: S. Davies (1/2) 12'	Report	Try: Makase 20' c Willemse 31' m Con: Du Toit (1/2) 21'

Liberty Stadium
Attendance: 4,673
Referee: David Wilkinson (IRFU)

16 February 2018
19:35

(1 BP) Ulster (Ireland)	16–17	(Scotland) Edinburgh
Try: Cooney 8' c Con: Cooney (1/1) 9'; Pen: Cooney (3/3) 42', 55', 66'	Report	Try: Harries 33' c Carmichael 62' c Con: Hidalgo-Clyne (2/2) 35', 63'; Drop: Weir (1/1) 80'

Kingspan Stadium
Attendance: 14,497
Referee: Nigel Owens (WRU)

17 February 2018
15:15

Leinster (Ireland)	20–13	(Wales) Scarlets (1 BP)
Try: Lowe (2) 18' m, 34' m L. McGrath 40' c Con: Frawley (1/1) 41'; Pen: Frawley (1/1) 69'	Report	Try: McNicholl 9' c Con: Jones (1/1) 11'; Pen: Jones (2/3) 57', 80'

RDS Arena
Attendance: 14,916
Referee: John Lacey (IRFU)

17 February 2018
17:30

Cardiff Blues (Wales)	25–18	(Ireland) Munster (1 BP)
Try: Cook 18' m L. Williams 23' c Lane 26' c Con: Evans (2/3) 24', 27'; Pen: Evans (2/2) 67', 75'	Report	Try: Cloete 33' m Fitzgerald 52' c Con: Keatley (1/2) 53'; Pen: Keatley (1/2) 43'; Bleyendaal (1/1) 80+1'

Cardiff Arms Park
Attendance: 6,086
Referee: Stuart Berry (SARU)

18 February 2018
15:30

(1 BP) Dragons (Wales)	15–18	(Italy) Benetton
Try: Rosser 1' m Belcher (2) 6' m, 35' m	Report	Try: Sgarbi 7' c Ioane 13' m Con: McKinley (1/2) 9'; Pen: Banks (2/2) 56', 65'

Rodney Parade
Attendance: 3,779
Referee: Quinton Immelman (SARU)

=== Round 16 ===
23 February 2018
19:00

Munster (Ireland)	21–10	(Scotland) Glasgow Warriors
Try: N. Scannell 24' c Cronin 48' m Con: Bleyendaal (1/2) 24'; Pen: Bleyendaal (3/4) 10', 34', 61'	Report	Try: G. Horne 46' c Con: Hastings (1/1) 47'; Pen: Hastings (1/1) 42'

Irish Independent Park
Attendance: 8,008
Referee: Marius Mitrea (FIR)

23 February 2018
19:30

Dragons (Wales)	12–25	(Scotland) Edinburgh (1 BP)
Try: Landman (2) 51' c, 67' m Con: Jones (1/1) 52'	Report	Try: Cochrane 24' c Dean 43' m Weir 72' m Fenton 80' m Con: Hidalgo-Clyne (1/2) 25'; Pen: Hidalgo-Clyne (1/1) 3'

Eugene Cross Park
Attendance: 4,052
Referee: George Clancy (IRFU)

23 February 2018
19:35

(1 BP) Leinster (Ireland)	64–7	(South Africa) Southern Kings
Try: B. Byrne (2) 3' c, 27' c McCarthy (2) 10' c, 47' c B. Daly (2) 17' m, 64' m D. Kearney 22' c Frawley 33' c Lowe 53' m Larmour 75' c Con: Frawley (7/10) 4', 11', 22', 28', 34', 48', 75'	Report	Try: Willemse 14' c Con: Du Toit (1/1) 15'

RDS Arena
Attendance: 10,215
Referee: Dan Jones (WRU)

24 February 2018
12:00

(1 BP) Benetton (Italy)	19–22	(Ireland) Connacht
Try: Tebaldi 35' c Ioane 58' m Fuser 80' c Con: Banks (2/3) 37', 80'	Report	Try: Bealham 43' m Butler 61' c Griffin 73' c Con: Carty (2/3) 62', 74'; Pen: Carty (1/2) 70'

Stadio Comunale di Monigo
Attendance: 2,100
Referee: Lloyd Linton (SRU)

24 February 2018
17:30

Ospreys (Wales)	27–26	(South Africa) Cheetahs (2 BP)
Try: Beck 42' c S. Cross 53' c Phillips 78' c Con: S. Davies (3/3) 43', 54', 79'; Pen: S. Davies (2/2) 40', 68'	Report	Try: Van Jaarsveld 9' m Hugo 14' c Lee 45' c Barry 56' c Con: N. Marais (3/4) 15', 47', 56'

Liberty Stadium
Attendance: 3,842
Referee: Ben Whitehouse (WRU)

24 February 2018
19:35

(1 BP) Scarlets (Wales)	34–10	(Ireland) Ulster
Try: Nicholas 43' c Conbeer 57' c Asquith 64' c Beirne 76' c Con: Jones (4/4) 44', 58', 65', 76'; Pen: Jones (2/2) 9', 55'	Report	Try: McCloskey 2' c Con: Cooney (1/1) 3'; Pen: Cooney (1/1) 50'

Parc y Scarlets
Attendance: 6,941
Referee: Ian Davies (WRU)

25 February 2018
13:00

(1 BP) Zebre (Italy)	7–10	(Wales) Cardiff Blues
Try: Venditti 35' c Con: Palazzani (1/1) 37'	Report	Try: Lane 27' c Con: Evans (1/1) 28'; Pen: Evans (1/2) 39'

Stadio Sergio Lanfranchi
Attendance: 1,000
Referee: Frank Murphy (IRFU)

=== Round 17 ===
All games scheduled to be held in the United Kingdom and Italy were postponed over 28 February and 1 March due to a cold weather wave resulting in sub-zero temperatures, and potential inability for air travel. The Scarlets–Leinster match was moved to the following weekend, being played on 9 March, whilst the Edinburgh–Munster and Cardiff Blues–Benetton games were rescheduled to 16 March. The Ulster–Glasgow Warriors game was moved to the weekend of 20/21/22 April, whilst the Zebre–Ospreys game was postponed to a yet to be determined date.

2 March 2018
17:35

(1 BP) Southern Kings (South Africa)	45–13	(Wales) Dragons
Try: Vulindlu (2) 33' c, 41' c Banda 39' c Lerm 45' c Volmink 66' c De Wee 76' c Con: Coleman (6/6) 34', 40', 41', 46', 67', 77'; Pen: Coleman (1/1) 51'	Report	Try: Jones 26' c Con: Jones (1/1) 26'; Pen: Jones (2/2) 5', 38'

Nelson Mandela Bay Stadium
Attendance: 4,574
Referee: Quinton Immelman (SARU)

2 March 2018
19:35

Cardiff Blues (Wales)	Postponed	(Italy) Benetton

Cardiff Arms Park
Referee: Mike Adamson (SRU)

2 March 2018
19:35

Edinburgh (Scotland)	Postponed	(Ireland) Munster

Murrayfield Stadium
Referee: Ben Whitehouse (WRU)

2 March 2018
19:35

Ulster (Ireland)	Postponed	(Scotland) Glasgow Warriors

Kingspan Stadium
Referee: John Lacey (IRFU)

3 March 2018
15:15

Scarlets (Wales)	Postponed	(Ireland) Leinster

Parc y Scarlets
Referee: Nigel Owens (WRU)

3 March 2018
17:30

Zebre (Italy)	Postponed	(Wales) Ospreys

Stadio Sergio Lanfranchi
Referee: George Clancy (IRFU)

3 March 2018
17:35

Cheetahs (South Africa)	26–25	(Ireland) Connacht (1 BP)
Try: Cassiem 3' c Maxwane 60' c Con: N. Marais (2/2) 4', 61'; Pen: N. Marais (4/5) 9', 17', 24', 79'	Report	Try: Healy (2) 14' c, 20' m Griffin 57' c Con: J. Carty (2/3) 15', 58'; Pen: J. Carty (2/3) 38', 42'

Toyota Stadium
Attendance: 6,095
Referee: Stuart Berry (SARU)

=== Round 17 rescheduled matches ===
9 March 2018
19:35

Scarlets (Wales)	10–10	(Ireland) Leinster
Try: Asquith 64' c Con: D. Jones (1/1) 65'; Pen: D. Jones (1/3) 80'	Report	Try: E. Byrne 44' c Con: R. Byrne (1/1) 45'; Pen: R. Byrne (1/1) 72'

Parc y Scarlets
Attendance: 9,108
Referee: Nigel Owens (WRU)

- Match rescheduled from 3 March 2018.

16 March 2018
19:35

(1 BP) Cardiff Blues (Wales)	31–25	(Italy) Benetton (1 BP)
Try: Lane 27' c Robinson 30' c E. Jenkins 48' c N. Williams 53' c Con: Evans (4/4) 28', 31', 48', 54'; Pen: Evans (1/1) 37'	Report	Try: Bronzini 34' c Ioane 49' c Baravalle 79' c Con: Banks (1/1) 35'; McKinley (1/2) 51'; Pen: Banks (2/2) 3', 14'

Cardiff Arms Park
Attendance: 4,782
Referee: John Lacey IRFU)

- Match rescheduled from 2 March 2018.

16 March 2018
19:35

Edinburgh (Scotland)	12–6	(Ireland) Munster (1 BP)
Try: Van der Merwe (2) 35' m, 56' c Con: Van der Walt (1/2) 57'	Report	Pen: Hanrahan (2/2) 19', 49'

Murrayfield Stadium
Attendance: 4,089
Referee: Ben Whitehouse (WRU)

- Match rescheduled from 2 March 2018.

=== Round 18 ===
23 March 2018
19:35

(1 BP) Connacht (Ireland)	22–29	(Scotland) Edinburgh
Try: O'Halloran 11' c Farrell 16' c Bealham 65' m Con: J. Carty (2/2) 12', 17'; Pen: J. Carty (1/2) 39'	Report	Try: Fife 1' m Van der Merwe 22' m Weir 72' c Con: Weir (1/1) 73'; Pen: Van der Walt (1/1) 7'; Weir (3/3) 61', 70', 80'

Galway Sportsgrounds
Attendance: 5,048
Referee: George Clancy (IRFU)

23 March 2018
19:35

Dragons (Wales)	17–29	(South Africa) Cheetahs (1 BP)
Try: Hewitt 11' c Dee 70' c Con: Robson (2/2) 13', 71'; Drop: Robson (1/1) 27'	Report	Try: Maxwane (2) 41' c, 61' m Zeilinga 48' c Blommetjies 72' c Con: N. Marais (2/3) 41', 49'; Zeilinga (1/1) 73'; Pen: N. Marais (1/1) 18'

Rodney Parade
Attendance: 4,406
Referee: Nigel Owens (WRU)

23 March 2018
19:35

(1 BP) Glasgow Warriors (Scotland)	68–7	(Italy) Zebre
Try: Van der Merwe (2) 7' c, 26' c Jackson (2) 11' c, 38' m Penalty try 23'; Pyrgos 32' c L. Jones 41' c Fagerson 51' c Gibbins 57' c Masaga 65' c Con: A. Hastings (8/9) 8', 12', 27', 33', 42', 53', 59', 66'	Report	Try: Canna 49' c Con: Canna (1/1) 50'

Scotstoun Stadium
Attendance: 7,351
Referee: Craig Evans (WRU)

24 March 2018
13:00

(2 BP) Southern Kings (South Africa)	35–36	(Italy) Benetton (1 BP)
Try: Vulindlu 9' c Masimla 17' c Lerm 36' c Penalty try 57'; B. Klaasen 72' c Con: Coleman (2/2) 10', 18'; Banda (2/2) 38', 73'	Report	Try: Baravalle 2' m Lazzaroni 5' c Banks 21' c Iannone 28' c Steyn 49' c Con: Banks (4/5) 6', 22', 29', 50'; Pen: Banks (1/1) 64'

Nelson Mandela Bay Stadium
Attendance: 4,913
Referee: Quinton Immelman (SARU)

24 March 2018
15:15

(1 BP) Cardiff Blues (Wales)	35–17	(Ireland) Ulster
Try: Evans 1' c Scully 12' c Dacey 56' m D. Lewis 80' c Con: Evans (4/5) 2', 13', 62', 80'; Pen: Evans (2/2) 40', 70'	Report	Try: Shanahan 78' m Pen: Cooney (4/5) 5', 38', 45', 52'

Cardiff Arms Park
Attendance: 5,763
Referee: Mike Adamson (SRU)

24 March 2018
17:30

Munster (Ireland)	19–7	(Wales) Scarlets
Try: Hart 27' m Copeland 47' c Wootton 77' c Con: Keatley (2/3) 47', 77'	Report	Try: A. Davies 6' c Con: Patchell (1/1) 7' c Pen: Patchell (0/1)

Thomond Park
Attendance: 14,215
Referee: Marius Mitrea (FIR)

24 March 2018
19:35

(1 BP) Ospreys (Wales)	32–18	(Ireland) Leinster
Try: Evans (2) 12' c, 24' m Habberfield 37' c Tipuric 48' c Con: Biggar (3/4) 13', 38', 49'; Pen: Biggar (2/2) 61', 80'	Report	Try: B. Daly 39' m O'Loughlin 52' c Con: R. Byrne (0/1); Carbery (1/1) 53'; Pen: R. Byrne (1/1) 7'; Carbery (1/1) 57'

Liberty Stadium
Attendance: 7,816
Referee: John Lacey (IRFU)

=== Round 19 ===
6 April 2018
19:35

Edinburgh (Scotland)	20–32	(Ireland) Ulster (1 BP)
Try: Weir 30' c Penalty try 57'; Con: Weir (1/1) 31'; Pen: Weir (2/2) 9', 15'	Report	Try: Cave 12' c Piutau 19' m Cooney 23' c Henderson 78' c Con: Cooney (3/4) 13', 25', 79'; Pen: Cooney (2/2) 50', 64'

Murrayfield Stadium
Attendance: 4,989
Referee: Nigel Owens (WRU)

6 April 2018
19:35

(1 BP) Ospreys (Wales)	39–10	(Ireland) Connacht
Try: Hassler 14' c Evans 26' c Otten 52' c Beck 60' c Dirksen 66' m Con: Biggar (4/5) 15', 27', 52', 61'; Pen: Biggar (2/2) 2', 9'	Report	Try: Ronaldson 21' c Con: Ronaldson (1/1) 22'; Pen: J. Carty (1/2) 39'

Liberty Stadium
Attendance: 8,092
Referee: Ben Whitehouse (WRU)

7 April 2018
14:00

(1 BP) Leinster (Ireland)	41–6	(Italy) Zebre
Try: Lowe (2) 12' c, 68' m O'Loughlin 34' m Deegan (2) 40' m, 59' m Abdaladze 71' c B. Byrne 76' m Con: R. Byrne (3/7) 13', 60', 73'	Report	Pen: Canna (2/2) 33', 51'

RDS Arena
Attendance: 10,115
Referee: Ian Davies (WRU)

7 April 2018
16:15

Scarlets (Wales)	26–8	(Scotland) Glasgow Warriors
Try: Patchell (2) 27' m, 78' c G. Davies 54' m Con: Halfpenny (1/3) 80'; Pen: Halfpenny (3/4) 33', 53', 59'	Report	Try: Pyrgos 61' m Pen: P. Horne (1/2) 42'

Parc y Scarlets
Attendance: 10,076
Referee: George Clancy (IRFU)

7 April 2018
17:00

(1 BP) Benetton (Italy)	29–27	(Wales) Dragons (1 BP)
Try: Ruzza 1' c Ioane 23' m Allan 27' c Tebaldi 40' c Con: Allan (3/4) 2', 29', 40'; Pen: Tebaldi (1/1) 80'	Report	Try: Hill 53' c Rosser 61' c Edwards 65' c Con: Robson (3/3) 54', 62', 67'; Pen: Robson (2/2) 8', 15'

Stadio Comunale di Monigo
Attendance: 4,100
Referee: Andrew Brace (IRFU)

7 April 2018
18:15

(1 BP) Cheetahs (South Africa)	29–27	(Wales) Cardiff Blues (1 BP)
Try: Maxwane (2) 13' m, 38' c Venter 23' c Penalty try 80'; Con: N. Marais (2/3) 25', 40'; Pen: N. Marais (1/1) 6'	Report	Try: Lane 48' c Halaholo 58' c Lee-Lo 67' c Con: Shingler (3/3) 49', 59', 68'; Pen: Shingler (2/2) 2', 20'

Toyota Stadium
Attendance: 5,269
Referee: Mike Adamson (SRU)

7 April 2018
18:35

Southern Kings (South Africa)	22–39	(Ireland) Munster (1 BP)
Try: Ntsila 26' c Greeff 30' m Makase 74' c Con: Banda (2/3) 28', 75'; Pen: Banda (1/2) 35'	Report	Try: N. Scannell 37' m Nash 40' m Stander 47' c Goggin 53' m Marshall 68' c Kilcoyne 71' c Con: Keatley (3/6) 48', 68', 72'; Pen: Keatley (1/1) 16'

Outeniqua Park
Attendance: 6,318
Referee: Lloyd Linton (SRU)

=== Round 20 ===
13 April 2018
18:35

(1 BP) Cheetahs (South Africa)	17–19	(Ireland) Munster
Try: Blommetjies 10' c Meyer 28' c Con: Goosen (2/2) 11', 29'; Pen: Goosen (1/1) 40'	Report	Try: Murray 36' c Con: Hanrahan (1/1) 36'; Pen: Hanrahan (3/3) 44', 52', 61'; Murray (1/1) 65'

Toyota Stadium
Attendance: 6,869
Referee: Mike Adamson (SRU)

13 April 2018
19:35

(1 BP) Glasgow Warriors (Scotland)	35–22	(Ireland) Connacht
Try: Hogg 3' c Dunbar 26' c Brown 40' c Pyrgos 43' m Con: P. Horne (3/4) 4', 27', 40'; Pen: P. Horne (3/3) 7', 13', 21'	Report	Try: Bealham 1' m Blade 67' c Penalty try 75'; Con: J. Carty (1/2) 68'; Pen: J. Carty (1/1) 24'

Scotstoun Stadium
Attendance: 7,351
Referee: Frank Murphy (IRFU)

13 April 2018
19:35

Ulster (Ireland)	8–0	(Wales) Ospreys
Try: Stockdale 79' m Pen: Cooney (1/1) 6'	Report

Kingspan Stadium
Attendance: 13,267
Referee: Andrew Brace (IRFU)

14 April 2018
16:00

(1 BP) Zebre (Italy)	34–32	(Wales) Dragons (2 BP)
Try: Violi 5' c Castello 45' c D'Apice 50' m Meyer 55' m Canna 70' c Con: Canna (3/5) 6', 46', 71'; Pen: Canna (1/1) 17'	Report	Try: Rosser (3) 12' m, 18' c, 33' c C. Davies 40' c Con: Robson (3/4) 19', 34', 40'; Pen: Robson (2/3) 47', 66'

Stadio Tommaso Fattori
Attendance: 5,862
Referee: George Clancy (IRFU)

14 April 2018
15:15

(1 BP) Edinburgh (Scotland)	52–14	(Wales) Scarlets
Try: Kinghorn 6' m Van der Merwe (2) 8' c, 45' c Hidalgo-Clyne 18' c Bradbury 23' c Crosbie 57' c Bennett 75' c Fowles 80' m Con: Hidalgo-Clyne (5/6) 9', 19', 24', 46', 58'; Weir (1/2) 76'	Report	Try: Varndell 27' c D. Jones 32' c Con: D. Jones (2/2) 28', 33'

Murrayfield Stadium
Attendance: 3,849
Referee: Stuart Berry (SARU)

14 April 2018
18:35

Southern Kings (South Africa)	12–45	(Wales) Cardiff Blues (1 BP)
Try: Dukisa 47' c Welemu 68' m Con: Banda (1/1) 48'	Report	Try: Cuthbert 1' c Davies 6' c Turnbull 24' c Halaholo 31' c Myhill (2) 37' m, 54' m Scully 42' c Con: Evans (5/7) 2', 7', 25', 32', 43'

Nelson Mandela Bay Stadium
Attendance: 3,706
Referee: Sean Gallagher (IRFU)

14 April 2018
19:35

(1 BP) Leinster (Ireland)	15–17	(Italy) Benetton
Try: Strauss 6' c B. Daly 40' m Con: Carbery (1/2) 7'; Pen: Carbery (1/1) 57'	Report	Try: Bigi 10' m Ruzza 49' m Allan 53' c Con: Allan (1/1) 54'

RDS Arena
Attendance: 12,586
Referee: Ben Whitehouse (WRU)

=== Round 17 rescheduled match ===
21 April 2018
18:45

(1 BP) Zebre (Italy)	37–14	(Wales) Ospreys
Try: Biagi 6' m Bellini (3) 11' m, 13' m, 66' m Bisegni 22' c Di Giulio 72' c Con: Canna (2/6) 23', 72'; Pen: Canna (1/1) 54'	Report	Try: Cross 30' c Morgan-Williams 73' c Con: S. Davies (2/2) 31', 74'

Stadio Sergio Lanfranchi
Attendance: 3,000
Referee: Lloyd Linton (SRU)

- Match rescheduled from 3 March 2018.

21 April 2018
18:05

(1 BP) Ulster (Ireland)	36–15	(Scotland) Glasgow Warriors
Try: Cooney 11' c Timoney (2) 54' c, 82' m Reidy 60' m Con: Cooney (1/1) 12'; McPhillips (1/2) 56'; Pen: Cooney (3/3) 4', 39', 40'; McPhillips (1/1) 68'	Report	Try: Gibbins (2) 21' c, 46' m Con: Russell (1/2) 21'; Pen: Russell (1/1) 18'

Kingspan Stadium
Attendance: 16,186
Referee: Stuart Berry (SARU)

- Match rescheduled from 2 March 2018.

=== Round 21 ===
28 April 2018
13:00

Southern Kings (South Africa)	20–29	(South Africa) Cheetahs (1 BP)
Try: Dukisa 4' c H. Klaasen 42' c Con: Banda (2/2) 5', 43'; Pen: Banda (2/2) 14', 22'	Report	Try: Schoeman 18' c N. Marais 28' m Cassiem 39' c Venter 52' c Con: N. Marais (3/4) 19', 40', 53'; Pen: N. Marais (1/1) 2'

Nelson Mandela Bay Stadium
Attendance: 4,179
Referee: Cwengile Jadezweni (SARU)

28 April 2018
16:00

(1 BP) Benetton (Italy)	17–22	(Italy) Zebre
Try: Sgarbi (2) 22' c, 47' c Con: Allan (2/2) 24', 49'; Pen: Allan (1/1) 52'	Report	Try: Sisi 40' c Canna 44' m Con: Canna (1/1) 40'; Pen: Violi (4/4) 32', 54', 63', 75'

Stadio Comunale di Monigo
Attendance: 5,000
Referee: JP Doyle (RFU)

28 April 2018
15:05

(1 BP) Connacht (Ireland)	47–10	(Ireland) Leinster
Try: Adeolokun (2) 2' c, 41' m O'Halloran 28' c Marmion (2) 32' c, 49' c Aki 70' c Blade 75' c Con: J. Carty (4/5) 4', 28', 32', 50'; Ronaldson (1/1) 71'; Muldoon (1/1) 76'	Report	Try: B. Daly 53' c Con: Carbery (1/1) 54'; Pen: Carbery (1/2) 12'

Galway Sportsgrounds
Attendance: 8,129
Referee: Andrew Brace (IRFU)

28 April 2018
17:35

Munster (Ireland)	24–24	(Ireland) Ulster
Try: Williams 1' c Scott 26' c Copeland 48' c Con: Hanrahan (3/3) 2', 28', 49'; Pen: Hanrahan (1/1) 67'	Report	Try: McCloskey 4' c Best (2) 32' c, 40' c Con: McPhillips (3/3) 5', 34', 40'; Pen: McPhillips (1/1) 15'

Thomond Park
Attendance: 16,178
Referee: Ben Whitehouse (WRU)

==== Judgement Day ====
28 April 2018
15:05

Dragons (Wales)	8–33	(Wales) Scarlets (1 BP)
Try: Rosser 62' m Pen: Robson (1/1) 22'	Report	Try: Elias 5' c Penalty try 46'; Beirne (2) 50' m, 55' c S. Evans 74' c Con: Halfpenny (3/4) 6', 56', 75'

Principality Stadium
Attendance: 62,338
Referee: Lloyd Linton (SRU)

28 April 2018
17:35

(1 BP) Cardiff Blues (Wales)	23–26	(Wales) Ospreys
Try: Anscombe 23' c Smith 29' c Con: Anscombe (2/2) 24', 30'; Pen: Anscombe (3/4) 13', 37', 67'	Report	Try: A.W. Jones 17' c Biggar 54' c Con: Biggar (2/2) 18', 55'; Pen: Biggar (3/4) 2', 32', 73'; Drop: Biggar (1/1) 77'

Principality Stadium
Attendance: 62,338
Referee: Frank Murphy (IRFU)

==== 1872 Cup 3rd round ====
28 April 2018
19:45

Edinburgh (Scotland)	24–19	(Scotland) Glasgow Warriors (1 BP)
Try: Johnstone 18' c Lay 34' c van der Merwe 40'c Con: Hidalgo-Clyne (3/3) 19', 36', 40+2'; Pen: Weir (1/1) 66'	Report	Try: van der Merwe (2) 11' c, 68' m Gibbins; Con: Russell (2/3) 12', 22'

Murrayfield Stadium
Attendance: 25,353
Referee: Nigel Owens (WRU)

== Play-offs ==
The top side from each of the two conferences are given a bye to the semi-finals and have home advantage. Teams placed second and third in opposite conferences play each other to determine the other two semi-finalists with the team ranked second having home advantage.

The play-offs are scheduled in the four weeks after the regular season has been completed.

Quarter-finals
(Wales) Scarlets	43
(South Africa) Cheetahs	8
(Ireland) Munster	20
(Scotland) Edinburgh	16

Semi-finals
(Scotland) Glasgow Warriors	13
(Wales) Scarlets	28
(Ireland) Leinster	16
(Ireland) Munster	15

Pro14 Final
(Wales) Scarlets	32
(Ireland) Leinster	40

=== Quarter-finals ===
5 May 2018
15:15

Munster (Ireland)	20–16	(Scotland) Edinburgh
Try: Marshall 8' c Earls 42' c Con: Hanrahan (2/2) 9', 43'; Pen: Hanrahan (2/3) 51', 72'	Report	Try: Fowles 58' c Con: Van der Walt (1/1) 59'; Pen: Hidalgo-Clyne (3/3) 18', 24', 55'

Thomond Park
Attendance: 10,205
Referee: Nigel Owens (WRU)

5 May 2018
18:35

Scarlets (Wales)	43–8	(South Africa) Cheetahs
Try: S. Evans (2) 5' c, 36' c Halfpenny 16' c Prydie 44' c J.M. Davies 54' c J. Evans 60' m Con: Halfpenny (2/2) 6', 17'; Patchell (3/4) 37', 44', 56'; Pen: Halfpenny (1/2) 15'	Report	Try: Blommetjies 75' m Pen: Goosen (1/1) 21'

Parc y Scarlets
Attendance: 7,105
Referee: George Clancy (IRFU)

=== Semi-finals ===
18 May 2018
19:45

Glasgow Warriors (Scotland)	13–28	(Wales) Scarlets
Try: Gray 59' m Grigg 72' m Con: Russell (0/2); Pen: Russell (1/1) 13'	Report	Try: Patchell 3' c G. Davies 16' c R. Evans 31' c Owens 47' c Con: Patchell (4/4) 4', 17', 32', 48'

Scotstoun Stadium
Attendance: 10,000
Referee: John Lacey (IRFU)

19 May 2018
15:15

Leinster (Ireland)	16–15	(Ireland) Munster
Try: Conan 7' c Con: Carbery (1/1) 7'; Pen: R. Byrne (1/3) 20'; Carbery (1/2) 76'	Report	Try: Earls 43' m Grobler 78' c Con: Keatley (1/2) 78'; Pen: Hanrahan (1/2) 18'

RDS Arena
Attendance: 18,930
Referee: Stuart Berry (SARU)

=== Final ===
26 May 2018
18:00

Leinster (Ireland)	40–32	(Wales) Scarlets
Try: Toner 29' m Lowe 40'+2 c Cronin 51' c Larmour 57' m Conan 68' c Con: Sexton (2/4) 40'+4, 53'; Carbery (1/1) 69'; Pen: Sexton (3/3) 6', 15', 24'	Report	Try: McNicholl (3) 34' m, 64' c, 80' c Kruger 78' c Con: Halfpenny (2/3) 64', 80'+1; D. Jones (1/1) 78'; Pen: Halfpenny (2/2) 8', 12'

Aviva Stadium
Attendance: 46,092
Referee: Stuart Berry (SARU)

== Play-off for the 7th Champions Cup place ==
The South African teams cannot compete in the European Rugby Champions Cup. The top three eligible teams in each conference automatically qualify for following year's Champions Cup. The fourth ranked eligible team in each conference meet in a play-off match with the winner taking the seventh Champions Cup place.

Ulster had home advantage against Ospreys by virtue of finishing with the greater number of points accumulated during the PRO14 regular league (62, as opposed to Ospreys’ 44). The match was played on Sunday 20 May, at the Kingspan Stadium.

20 May 2018
15:05

Ulster (Ireland)	35–17	(Wales) Ospreys
Try: Gilroy (2) 34' m, 41' c Treadwell 52' c Stockdale 72' c Con: Cooney (3/4) 42', 53', 73'; Pen: Cooney (3/3) 26', 64', 70'	Report	Try: A. W. Jones 15' c Dirksen 61' m Biggar 77' m Con: Biggar (1/3) 16'

Kingspan Stadium
Attendance: 7,014
Referee: Marius Mitrea (FIR)

== Referees ==
On 30 August, a 13-man referee elite squad was announced by Elite Referee Manager Greg Garner (number of matches refereed):

- (Scotland) Mike Adamson (SRU) – (8)
- (South Africa) Stuart Berry (SARU) – (0)
- (Ireland) Andrew Brace (IRFU) – (23)
- (Ireland) George Clancy (IRFU) – (89)
- (Wales) Ian Davies (WRU) – (64)
- (South Africa) Quinton Immelman (SARU) – (0)
- (Wales) Dan Jones (WRU) – (8)
- (Ireland) John Lacey (IRFU) – (63)
- (Italy) Marius Mitrea (FIR) – (68)
- (Ireland) Frank Murphy (IRFU) – (5)
- (Wales) Nigel Owens (WRU) – (152)
- (Wales) Ben Whitehouse (WRU) – (33)
- (Ireland) David Wilkinson (IRFU) – (51)

Note: Additional referees are used throughout the season, selected from a select development squad.

== Attendances by club ==
- Includes quarter-finals and semi-finals – the final is not included as it is held at a neutral venue. Due to the league structure of the Pro 14, some teams only played 10 league home games during the league stage, while others played 11. Does not include European Champions Cup play-off game.

Club	Home games	Total	Average	Highest	Lowest	% Capacity
(Italy) Benetton	11	39,200	3,564	5,000	2,100	53%
(Wales) Cardiff Blues (Note: Cardiff Blues attendance figures also include a 'home game' at the Principality Stadium. Their average attendance for Cardiff Arms Park was 6316.)	11	125,492	11,408	62,338	4,703	55%
(South Africa) Cheetahs	11	66,554	6,050	13,982	3,457	13%
(Ireland) Connacht	10	58,329	5,833	8,129	4,017	72%
(Wales) Dragons (Note: Dragons attendance figures also include a 'home game' at the Principality Stadium. Their average attendance for Rodney Parade was 5162.)	11	113,953	10,359	62,338	3,779	62%
(Scotland) Edinburgh	11	83,529	7,594	25,353	3,300	44%
(Scotland) Glasgow Warriors (Note: Glasgows attendance figure includes semi final playoff game.)	11	83,510	7,592	10,000	7,351	100%
(Ireland) Leinster (Note: Leinsters attendance figure includes semi final playoff game.)	11	184,723	16,793	46,374	10,115	76%
(Ireland) Munster (Note: Munsters attendance figure includes quarter final playoff game.)	12	159,461	13,288	26,267	7,854	74%
(Wales) Ospreys	10	69,937	6,994	12,093	3,842	34%
(Wales) Scarlets (Note: Scarlets attendance figure includes quarter final playoff game.)	11	98,985	8,999	14,509	6,941	61%
(South Africa) Southern Kings	10	43,350	4,335	6,711	2,836	20%
(Ireland) Ulster	11	161,292	14,663	17,631	12,291	81%
(Italy) Zebre	10	29,262	2,926	5,862	1,000	53%

== End of Season Awards ==
=== PRO14 Dream Team ===
Note: Flags to the left of player names indicate national team as has been defined under World Rugby eligibility rules, or primary nationality for players who have not yet earned international senior caps. Players may hold one or more non-WR nationalities.

Pos		Player	Team
FB	15	(Scotland) Blair Kinghorn	(Scotland) Edinburgh
RW	14	(Ireland) Jordan Larmour	(Ireland) Leinster
OC	13	(Scotland) Nick Grigg	(Scotland) Glasgow
IC	12	(Wales) Hadleigh Parkes	(Wales) Scarlets
LW	11	(New Zealand) James Lowe	(Ireland) Leinster
FH	10	(Wales) Rhys Patchell	(Wales) Scarlets
SH	9	(Ireland) John Cooney	(Ireland) Ulster
N8	8	(Ireland) Jack Conan	(Ireland) Leinster
OF	7	(New Zealand) Callum Gibbins (c)	(Scotland) Glasgow
BF	6	(Wales) Aaron Shingler	(Wales) Scarlets
RL	5	(Ireland) Tadhg Beirne	(Wales) Scarlets
LL	4	(Australia) Scott Fardy	(Ireland) Leinster
TP	3	(Ireland) Andrew Porter	(Ireland) Leinster
HK	2	(Namibia) Torsten van Jaarsveld	(South Africa) Cheetahs
LP	1	(Wales) Rob Evans	(Wales) Scarlets

=== Award winners ===
Award	Winner
Players' Player of the Season	(Ireland) Tadhg Beirne (Scarlets)
Young Player of the Season	(Ireland) Jordan Larmour (Leinster)
Coach of the Season	(Ireland) Leo Cullen (Leinster)
Chairman's Award	(England) Ed Jackson (Dragons)
Golden Boot	(South Africa) Fred Zeilinga (Cheetahs)
Fairplay Award	(Wales) Scarlets

== Leading scorers ==
=== Top points scorers ===
Rank	Player	Club	Points
1	John Cooney	Ulster	175
2	Carlo Canna	Zebre	132
3	Jack Carty	Connacht	131
4	Jarrod Evans	Cardiff Blues	127
5	Ross Byrne	Leinster	116

=== Top try scorers ===
Rank	Player	Club	Tries
1	Barry Daly	Leinster	12
2	Craig Gilroy	Ulster	10
2	Makazole Mapimpi	Cheetahs	10
4	George Horne	Glasgow Warriors	9
4	Johnny McNicholl	Scarlets	9
