= Conor Oliver =

Irish rugby union player

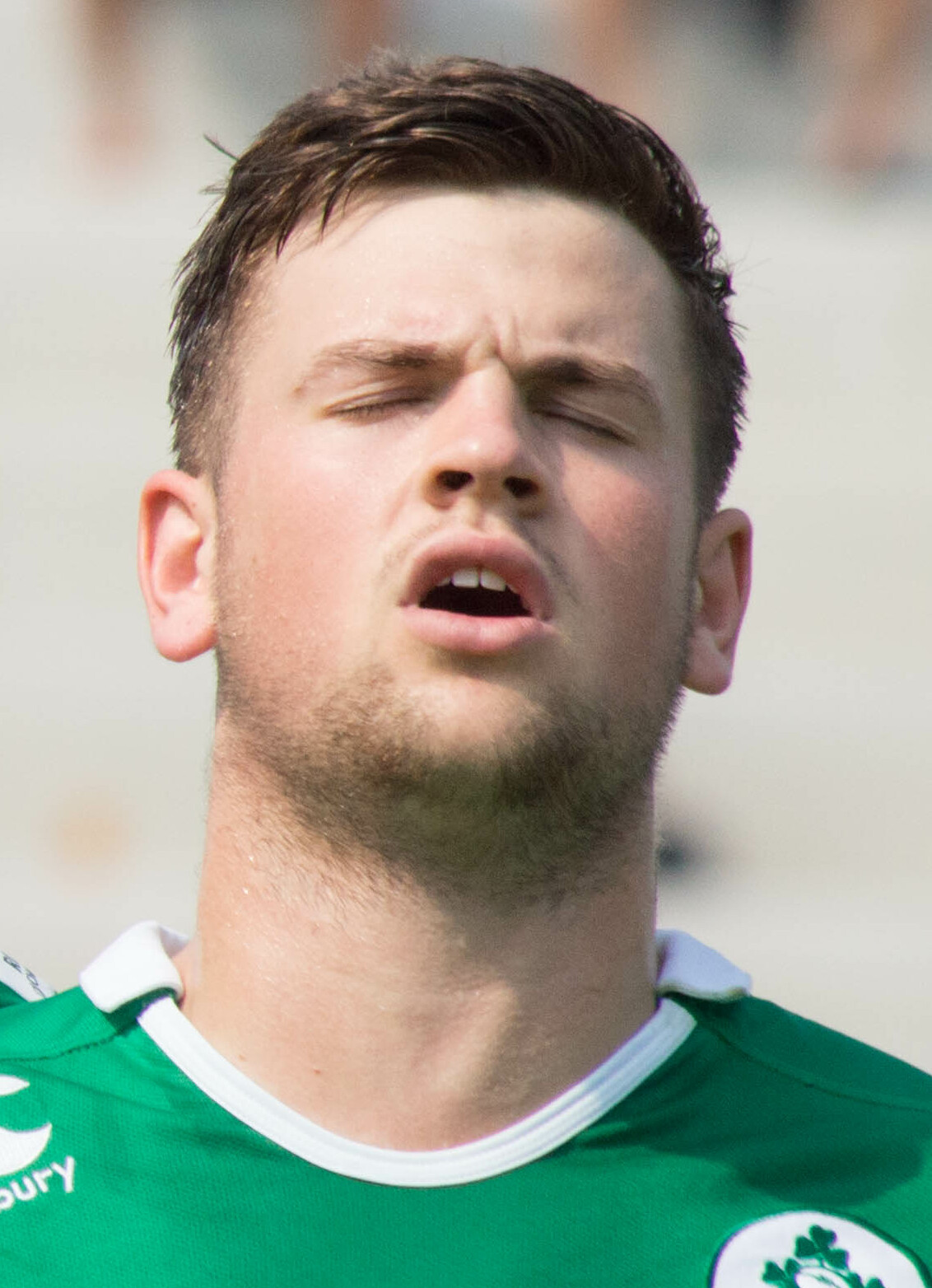
- Oliver at the 2015 World Rugby Under 20 Championship
- Born: 21 September 1995 (age 31) Skerries, County Dublin, Ireland
- Height: 1.83 m (6 ft 0 in)
- Weight: 101 kg (15.9 st; 223 lb)
- School: Blackrock College

Rugby union career
- Position(s): Flanker, Number 8
Amateur team(s)
| Years | Team | Apps | (Points) |
| 2014–2015 | St Mary's | | |
| 2015– | Garryowen | | |
Senior career
| Years | Team | Apps | (Points) |
| 2016–2020 | Munster | 27 | (20) |
| 2020– | Connacht | 81 | (50) |
- Correct as of 26 April 2024
International career
| Years | Team | Apps | (Points) |
| 2015 | Ireland U20 | 3 | (5) |
- Correct as of 15 June 2015

Conor Oliver (born 21 September 1995) is an Irish rugby union player for United Rugby Championship side Connacht. He plays as a flanker and represents Garryowen in the All-Ireland League.

== Early life ==
Born in Skerries, County Dublin, Oliver first began playing rugby for Skerries Under-8s, remaining with the club until his Leaving Cert year, when he joined Blackrock College and won the 2014 Leinster Schools Rugby Senior Cup alongside current Irish international Joey Carbery, with Oliver scoring his sides opening try in their 22–17 win against Clongowes Wood College in the final.

== Domestic career ==
=== Munster ===
Oliver joined the Munster Academy at the beginning of the 2015–16 season, having found his options limited with his native Leinster. On 19 February 2016, Oliver made his competitive debut for Munster when he came on as a replacement for Tommy O'Donnell against Glasgow Warriors in a 2015–16 Pro12 fixture. On 24 September 2016, Oliver scored his first try for Munster, having come on as a replacement for injured teammate Jack O'Donoghue in a 2016–17 Pro12 fixture against Edinburgh.

He started in Munster's famous 27–14 win against Māori All Blacks in Thomond Park on 11 November 2016. On 24 February 2017, Oliver made his first appearance for Munster as a Number 8, starting in the position in the fixture against Scarlets. On 4 March 2017, Oliver came on as a replacement for Darren O'Shea in Munster's Pro12 fixture against Cardiff Blues, scoring a try in the 76th minute, converted by Rory Scannell, to help his side secure a 23–13 away victory in Cardiff Arms Park. On 31 March 2017, Oliver started for Munster A in their 2016–17 British and Irish Cup semi-final against Ealing Trailfinders, setting up Sammy Arnold's try and scoring two tries himself in the 25–9 win against the English Championship side at CIT.

Oliver was Man-of-the-Match in Munster's 10–7 win against Glasgow Warriors in Irish Independent Park on 8 April 2017. On 21 April 2017, Oliver started for Munster A in their British and Irish Cup final victory against Jersey Reds. On 4 May 2017, it was announced that Oliver had won the 2017 John McCarthy Award for Academy Player of the Year, having been nominated by his teammates for the award alongside Dan Goggin and Brian Scott. On 1 June 2017, it was announced that Oliver had been promoted to the senior Munster squad ahead of the 2017–18 season.

In late August 2017, Oliver underwent surgery for a shoulder injury and was ruled out until early 2018. He made his return for Munster on 1 January 2018, starting against Connacht in a 2017–18 Pro14 fixture and earning the Man-of-the-Match award in Munster's 39–13 win. He signed a new two-year deal with Munster in February 2018, advancing from a development to full contract.

Oliver was ruled out for 14 weeks after dropping a weight on one of his toes during pre-season gym training for the 2018–19 season. He made his return from the injury during Munster's Pro14 round 9 fixture against Italian side Zebre on 25 November 2018, replacing Chris Cloete during the second-half.

=== Connacht ===
Oliver joined Irish provincial side Connacht in July 2020, and made his debut for the province in their 26–20 win against Ulster on 23 August 2020.

== Ireland ==
Having been named in Ireland's squad for the 2015 Under-20's Six Nations Championship on 21 January 2015, Oliver made his debut for Ireland U20 on 13 March 2015, starting for the side in their 19–12 defeat against Wales U20 at the Eirias Stadium, Colwyn Bay. On 25 May 2015, Oliver was selected in the Ireland Under-20 squad for the 2015 World Rugby Under 20 Championship. On 6 June 2015, he started against Scotland U20 in a Pool C fixture, scoring a try in Ireland's 24–20 win, but also getting sin-binned during the game. On 15 June 2015, Oliver started in the 5th-8th place play-off against Wales U20, which Ireland lost 22–12.

== Honours ==
=== Munster A ===
- British and Irish Cup:
  - Winner (1): 2016–17
