= Dan Goggin (rugby union) =

Irish rugby union player

- Born: 10 December 1994 (age 31) Limerick, Ireland
- Height: 1.87 m (6 ft 1 1/2 in)
- Weight: 105 kg (16.5 st; 231 lb)
- School: St Munchin's College

Rugby union career
- Position(s): Centre, Wing
Amateur team(s)
Years	Team	Apps	(Points)
- Young Munster
2024 - Present	St Mary's College RFC		
Senior career
Years	Team	Apps	(Points)
2016–2023	Munster	81	(50)
2023–2024	Montauban	20	(5)
- Correct as of 02 June 2024
International career
Years	Team	Apps	(Points)
2014	Ireland U20	10	(0)
- Correct as of 20 June 2014
National sevens team
Years	Team		Comps
2015–2016	Ireland		2

Dan Goggin (born 10 December 1994) is an Irish rugby union player who plays as a centre for French Pro D2 club Montauban.

== Early life ==
Goggin was born Limerick and first played rugby at the age of 5 for UL Bohemians. He attended St Munchin's College and represented the school for three years in the Munster Schools Rugby Senior Cup before joining Young Munster.

== Club career ==
=== Munster ===
Goggin made his competitive debut for Munster on 3 September 2016 when he started against Scarlets in the sides opening 2016–17 Pro12 fixture. Goggin came on as a replacement for Jaco Taute in Munster's famous 27–14 win against Māori All Blacks in Thomond Park on 11 November 2016. Goggin was nominated by his teammates for the 2017 John McCarthy Award for Academy Player of the Year, alongside Conor Oliver and Brian Scott. On 1 June 2017, it was announced that Goggin had been promoted to the senior Munster squad ahead of the 2017–18 season.

In Munster's opening 2017–18 Pro14 fixture against Benetton on 1 September 2017, in which Goggin was used as a replacement, he suffered a knee injury which subsequently ruled him out for 4 months. Goggin made his return from the injury on 19 January 2018, coming off the bench for Munster A in their 27–0 British and Irish Cup win against Ospreys Premiership Select. He signed a new two-year contract with Munster in February 2018.

Goggin scored his first try for Munster in their 39–22 away win against Southern Kings on 7 April 2018. He scored two tries in Munster's 64–7 win against Ulster in round 5 of the 2018–19 Pro14 on 29 September 2018. Goggin made his Champions Cup debut on 13 October 2018, starting in Munster's opening 2018–19 pool 2 fixture against English side Exeter Chiefs, which ended in a 10–10 draw in Sandy Park. He scored two tries in Munster's 31–24 away win against Connacht on 5 January 2019. For his performances throughout the 2018–19 season, Goggin was presented with the Munster Young Player of the Year award in late April 2019.

Goggin won his 50th cap for Munster during their 15–6 defeat against Saracens during round 4 of the 2019–20 Champions Cup on 14 December 2019. He made his first senior start on the wing for Munster in their 13–6 defeat against provincial rivals Leinster in round 9 of the 2019–20 Pro14 on 28 December 2019. Goggin signed a two-year contract extension with Munster in January 2020. A hand injury sustained in Munster's 2020–21 Pro14 win against Benetton on 30 January 2021 required surgery, ruling Goggin out for 7–8 weeks. He signed a two-year contract extension with Munster in January 2022, but was released by the province in March 2023 to pursue a new playing opportunity abroad.

=== US Montauban ===
After his release by Munster in April 2023, Goggin joined French Pro D2 club Montauban on a one-year contract ahead of the 2023–24 season.

== Honours ==
=== Munster ===
- United Rugby Championship
  - Winner (1): 2022–23

=== St. Mary's college rfc ===
- AIL Championship

Winner: Mens player of the year
