= Jordan Larmour =

Irish rugby union player

- Full name: Jordan Ian Larmour
- Born: 10 June 1997 (age 29) Dublin, Ireland
- Height: 1.78 m (5 ft 10 in)
- Weight: 91 kg (201 lb; 14 st 5 lb)
- School: St. Andrew's College

Rugby union career
- Position(s): Wing, Fullback
- Current team: Leinster
Senior career
Years	Team	Apps	(Points)
2017–	Leinster	117	(245)
- Correct as of 10 December 2025
International career
Years	Team	Apps	(Points)
2017	Ireland U20	5	(10)
2018–	Ireland	32	(35)
- Correct as of 16 March 2024

Jordan Ian Larmour (born 10 June 1997) is an Irish professional rugby union player who plays as a wing for United Rugby Championship club Leinster and the Ireland national team.

== Early life ==
Larmour was born in Dublin, Ireland. He attended St. Andrews College, where he played both rugby and hockey. Towards the end of his school years, Larmour focused on rugby.

== Professional career ==
=== Leinster ===
Larmour joined St Mary's College RFC after finishing school and was in the Leinster Rugby academy . In January 2018, at the age of 20, Leinster signed him to a senior contract.

=== Ireland ===
Larmour was called up to the senior Ireland squad for the 2018 Six Nations Championship. He made his Ireland debut on 10 February 2018 when he came on as a replacement in 45th minute of the 56–19 win against Italy in week two of the 2018 Six Nations Championship. In November 2018 Larmour played against Italy in Chicago. He scored 3 tries and won the man of the match award.

== Honours ==
Ireland

- 3× Six Nations Championship: 2018, 2023, 2024
- 2× Grand Slam: 2018, 2023
- 2× Triple Crown: 2018, 2023,

Leinster

- 1× European Rugby Champions Cup: 2018
- 6× United Rugby Championship: 2018, 2019, 2020, 2021, 2025, 2026

Individual

- 1× World Rugby Breakthrough Player of the Year nominee: 2018
- 1× Pro14 Team of the Year: 2018
- 2× Pro14 Young Player of the Year: 2018, 2024
- 1× European Rugby Champions Cup Player of the Year nominee: 2020
