= Brian Scott (rugby union) =

Irish rugby union player

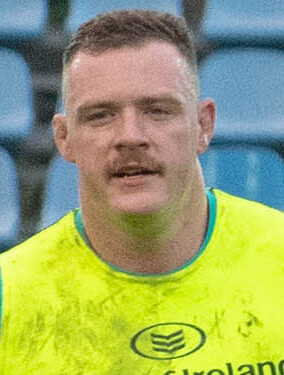
- Born: 9 March 1993 (age 33) Cork, Ireland
- Height: 1.96 m (6 ft 5 in)
- Weight: 122 kg (19.2 st; 269 lb)
- School: Presentation Brothers College

Rugby union career
- Position: Prop
Amateur team(s)
Years	Team	Apps	(Points)
- Dolphin
Senior career
Years	Team	Apps	(Points)
2016–2020	Munster	26	(10)
- Correct as of 24 November 2018
International career
Years	Team	Apps	(Points)
2013	Ireland U20	2	(0)
2017	Barbarians	1	(0)
- Correct as of 10 November 2017

Brian Scott (born 9 March 1993) is a retired Irish rugby union player. He played as a prop and represented Dolphin in the All-Ireland League. He was forced to retire from playing rugby due to injury in May 2020.

== Early life ==
Born in Cork, Scott first played rugby at the age of 6 with Dolphin RFC, before moving to Highfield R.F.C. and then Youghal RFC. He attended Presentation Brothers College and represented them in both Junior and Senior Cup rugby, winning the latter in 2010.

== Munster ==
On 3 September 2016, Scott made his competitive debut for Munster when he came on as a substitute against Scarlets in the sides opening 2016–17 Pro12 fixture. On 22 October 2016, Scott came on as a substitute in Munster's 38–17 win against Glasgow Warriors in Round 2 of the 2016–17 European Rugby Champions Cup, a match that was his European debut for the province. On 25 April 2017, it was announced that Scott had been nominated by his teammates for the 2017 John McCarthy Award for Academy Player of the Year, alongside Dan Goggin and Conor Oliver.

On 1 June 2017, it was announced that Scott had been promoted to the senior Munster squad ahead of the 2017–18 season. He signed a two-year full contract with Munster in March 2018, which will commence at the beginning of the 2018–19 season. Scott underwent surgery for a foot injury in December 2018, ruling him out for 4–6 months. However, the persistent foot ligament injury eventually forced Scott to retire from playing rugby in May 2020. He is expected to take up a coaching role with one of Munster's AIL clubs from the 2020–21 season.
