= Giulio Bisegni =

Italy international rugby union player (born 1992)

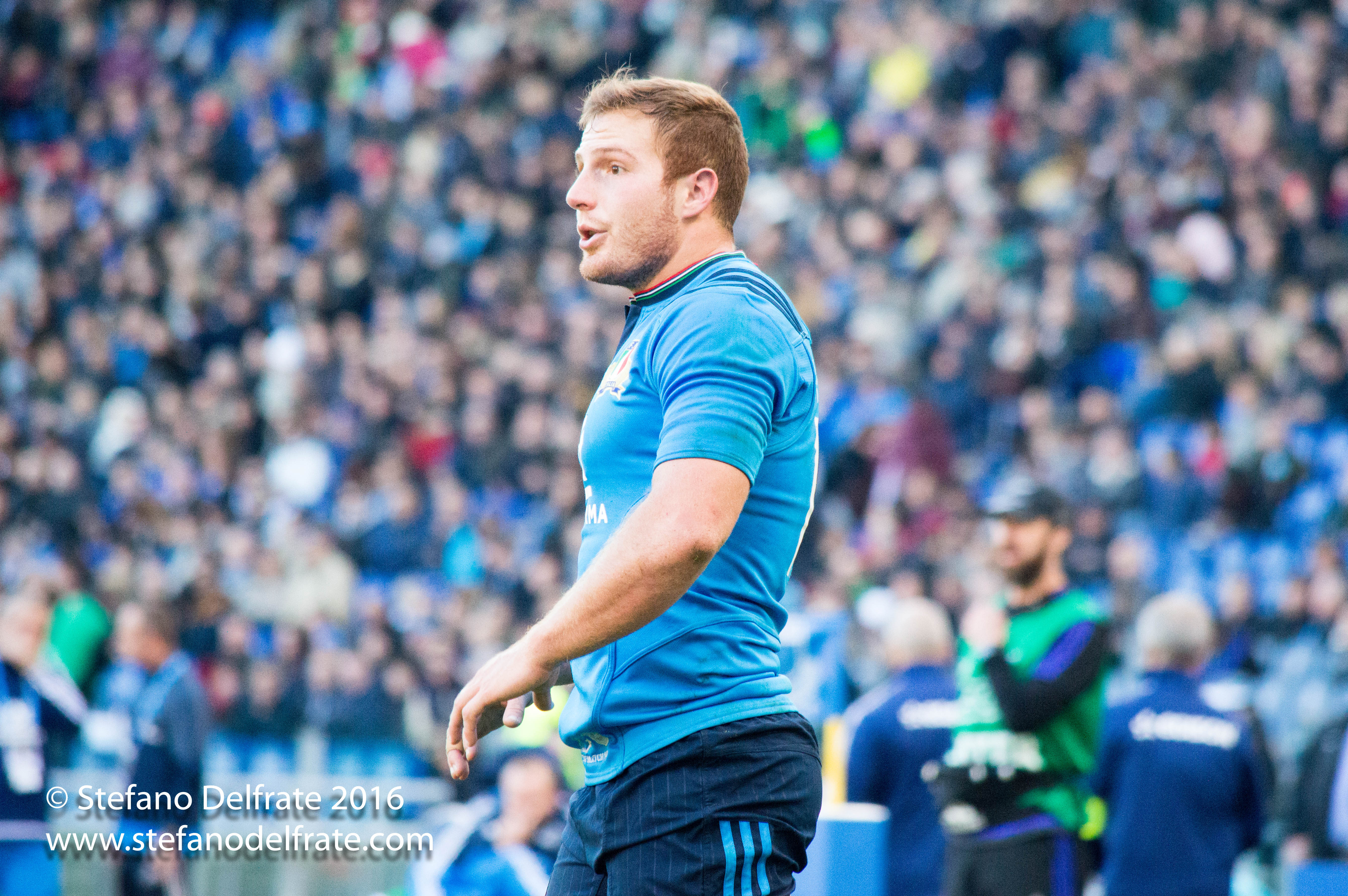
- Full name: Giulio Bisegni
- Born: 4 April 1992 (age 34) Frascati, Italy
- Height: 1.80 m (5 ft 11 in)
- Weight: 83 kg (13 st 1 lb; 183 lb)

Rugby union career
- Position: Centre
Youth career
- 2002-2011: Frascati
Senior career
Years	Team	Apps	(Points)
2011–2014	Lazio	41	(40)
2014	→Zebre	3	(0)
2014−2022	Zebre	115	(75)
2022−2024	Colorno	6	(0)
- Correct as of 26 Mar 2022
International career
Years	Team	Apps	(Points)
2012	Italy U20	8	(10)
2013−2014	Emerging Italy	3	(0)
2015−2020	Italy	16	(0)
- Correct as of 22 Feb 2020

Giulio Bisegni (born 4 April 1992) was an Italian rugby union player who played as a Centre . He represented Italy on 16 occasions.

Born in Frascati he was coached at local mini team ASD Frascati Mini Rugby 2001, in 2010 season he moved to promoted side Lazio, a team based in Rome. In January 2014, he trained with Zebre as a permit player. In May 2014, it was announced that he joined Zebre and he played for Italian team until 2021–22 United Rugby Championship season. From 2022 to 2024 he played for Colorno in Top10.

In 2012, Bisegni was named in the Italy U20 squad and in 2014 and 2015 he was part of Emerging Italy squad.

On 18 August 2019, he was named in the final 31-man squad for the 2019 Rugby World Cup and he represented Italy on 16 occasions, from 2015 to 2020.
