= Owen Lane =

Welsh rugby union player

- Born: Owen Lane; 20 December 1997 (age 28) Cardiff, Wales
- Height: 185 cm (6 ft 1 in)
- Weight: 100 kg (15 st 10 lb)
- School: Whitchurch High School, Cowbridge Comprehensive School

Rugby union career
- Position(s): Wing; Outside Centre
- Current team: Valence Romans Drôme Rugby
Senior career
Years	Team	Apps	(Points)
2016-2024	Cardiff Rugby	91	(215)
2024 -	Valence	32	(40)
- Correct as of 13 August 2026
International career
Years	Team	Apps	(Points)
- Wales U20
2019-2022	Wales	5	(10)
- Correct as of 16 August 2026

Owen Lane (born 20 December 1997) is a Wales international rugby union player who plays for Valence Romans Drôme Rugby as a centre or wing.

Lane made his professional debut for hometown club Cardiff in 2016 having previously played for their academy.

== International ==
In April 2019 Lane was called up to the preliminary squad for Wales for the 2019 Rugby World Cup. Lane made his debut for Wales 31 August 2019 in the starting line up for the world cup warm up match versus Ireland, scoring a try. On 22 October 2019 Lane was called into the Wales world cup squad, replacing the injured Josh Navidi.

=== International tries ===
Try	Opponent	Location	Venue	Competition	Date	Result
1	Ireland	Cardiff, Wales	Millennium Stadium	2019 Rugby World Cup warm-up matches	31 August 2019	Loss
2	Argentina	Cardiff, Wales	Millennium Stadium	2021 Summer Internationals	17 July 2021	Loss
