= Marcello Violi =

Italy international rugby union player

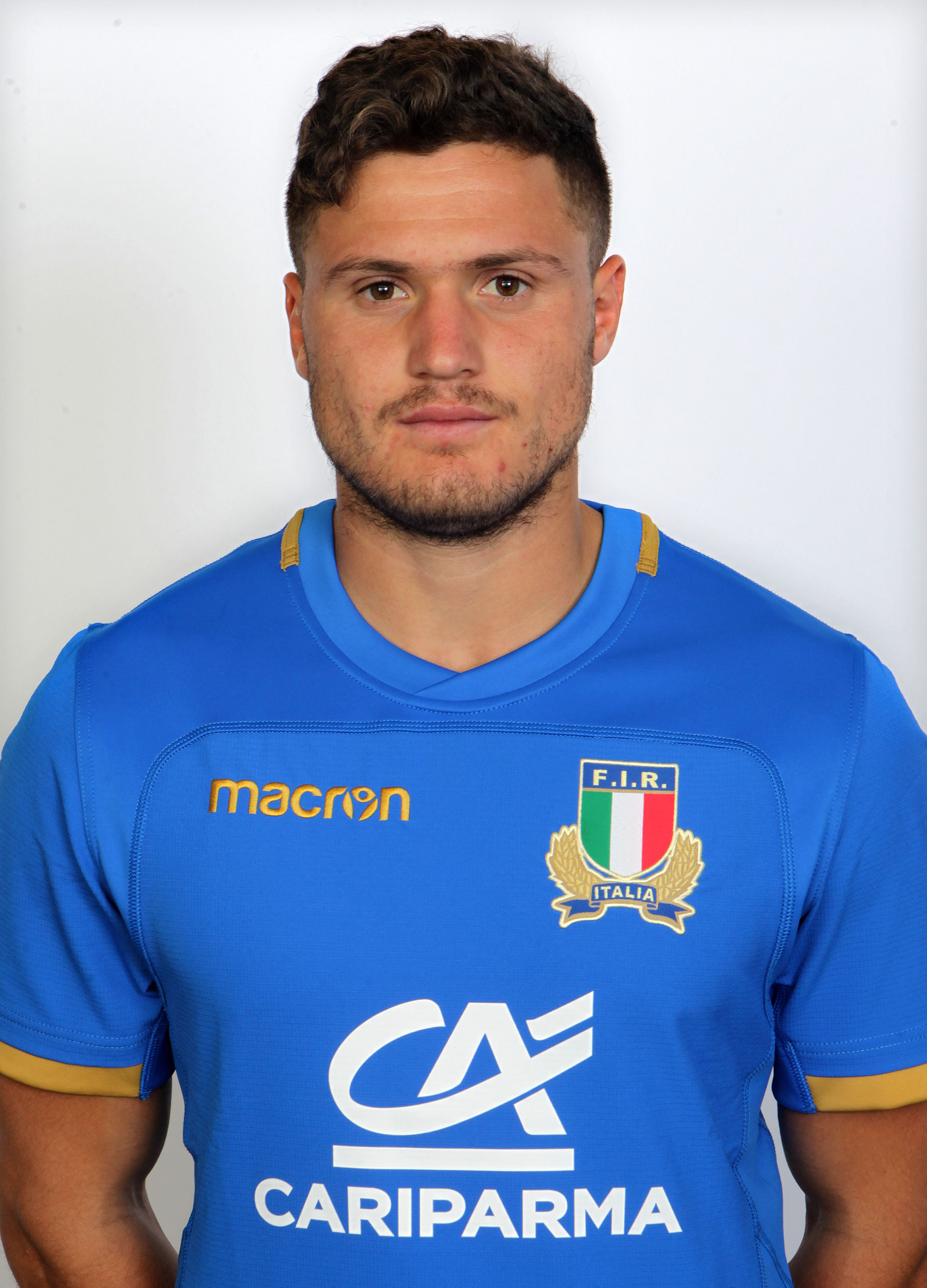
- Violi in 2017
- Born: 11 October 1993 (age 33) Parma
- Height: 1.78 m (5 ft 10 in)
- Weight: 80 kg (12 st 8 lb; 176 lb)

Rugby union career
- Position: Scrum-Half
- Current team: Valorugby Emilia
Youth career
- 2010−2011: Rugby Noceto Football Club
Senior career
| Years | Team | Apps | (Points) |
| 2011-2012 | F.I.R. Academy | 15 | (4) |
| 2012−2013 | Crociati RFC | 16 | (50) |
| 2013−2015 | Calvisano | 42 | (75) |
| 2014 | →Zebre | 1 | (0) |
| 2015−2022 | Zebre | 79 | (109) |
| 2022−2024 | Valorugby Emilia | 19 | (10) |
- Correct as of 25 Feb 2022
International career
| Years | Team | Apps | (Points) |
| 2012−2013 | Italy Under 20 | 11 | (34) |
| 2014−2021 | Italy A | 5 | (5) |
| 2015−2021 | Italy | 21 | (3) |
- Correct as of 1 Nov 2021
Coaching career
- Years: Team
- 2023−2024: Valorugby Emilia (Assistant coach)
- 2024–: Valorugby Emilia (Head coach)

Marcello Violi (born 11 October 1993) was an Italian rugby union player. His usual position was as a Scrum-half, and he currently plays for Valorugby Emilia. From summer 2024 he is named Head Coach of Valorugby Emilia.

Under contract with Calvisano, for the 2014–15 Pro12 season, he was named like Permit Player for Zebre in Pro 14. He played with Zebre from 2015 to 2022. From 2022 to 2024 he played for Valorugby Emilia in Serie A Elite.

After playing for Italy Under 20 in 2012 and 2013, in 2014, he was also named in the Emerging Italy squad.

In January 2015, Violi was named in the Italian squad for the 2015 Six Nations Championship. On 24 August 2015, he was named in the final 31-man squad for the 2015 Rugby World Cup. On the 19 October 2021, he was selected by Alessandro Troncon to be part of an Italy A squad for the 2021 end-of-year rugby union internationals. He represented Italy on 21 occasions.
