= Barry Daly (rugby union) =

Irish rugby union player

- Born: 19 September 1992 (age 34) Dublin, Ireland
- Height: 1.91 m (6 ft 3 in)
- Weight: 94 kg (14.8 st; 207 lb)
- School: Gonzaga College
- University: University College Dublin; Boston College

Rugby union career
- Position: Wing
Amateur team(s)
Years	Team	Apps	(Points)
- UCD
Senior career
Years	Team	Apps	(Points)
2016–2020	Leinster	36	(95)
- Correct as of 11 July 2020
International career
Years	Team	Apps	(Points)
2012	Ireland U20	5	(5)
2015	Ireland 7s		
- Correct as of 7 March 2017

Barry Daly (born 19 September 1992) is a retired rugby union player who last played for Leinster. He also played for UCD in the All Ireland League. Daly was awarded his first fully professional contract ahead of the 2016–17 season.

Daly also played rugby sevens. He was a member of the Ireland national rugby sevens team that unsuccessfully attempted to qualify as one of the twelve teams for the rugby sevens at the 2016 Summer Olympics in Rio, Brazil.

Daly was educated in Gonzaga College where he was famous for his hand offs.

== Leinster Rugby ==
In the 2017/2018 Season, Daly came off the bench vs. the Cardiff Blues to score his first try of the season. Following up on this, Daly scored a hat-trick against Toyota Cheetahs in what was a losing effort. Daly made his European debut against Montpellier, scoring the 4th try for Leinster, and securing a bonus point win. Daly was tipped for a call up to the Ireland squad, before injuring his ankle against Glasgow Warriors, leaving him on the sidelines for a minimum of 6 weeks.

Daly made his return from injury in the St. Stephens Day win against Munster, offloading to Robbie Henshaw to assist the second try of the game. On 6 January 2018, Daly scored his 6th try of the season in a win against Ulster. On 23 February, Daly continued his impressive try scoring season with Leinster, with two more tries against the Southern Kings in the RDS. On 5 March, Daly was called up to the extended Ireland squad for the Six Nations Matches against Scotland and England. Daly finished the 2017/2018 season as the Pro14 top try scorer with 12 tries, and Leinster's overall top try scorer with 13 tries.

== Injuries and retirement ==
After injuring his knee on the opening day of the 2018/2019 season, Daly returned to action in the win against Ulster. Daly followed up with two tries in two games against the Scarlets and Southern Kings.

In summer 2020, during the sporting hiatus due to the COVID-19 pandemic, Daly retired from professional rugby following two years during which he was sidelined by significant knee problems. Following retirement Daly enrolled in Boston College to pursue a master's degree in business.
