= 2024–25 Connacht Rugby season =

(Republic of Ireland) Connacht Rugby
- Union: IRFU
- Nickname: The Westerners
- Founded: 1888; 138 years ago
- Location: Galway, Ireland
- Region: Connacht
- Ground(s): The Sportsground, Galway; 6,170 (under development); MacHale Park, Mayo; 25,000
- CEO: Willie Ruane
- Coach: Peter Wilkins
- Captain: Cian Prendergast
- League: United Rugby Championship
| 1st kit | 2nd kit |

Official website
- www.connachtrugby.ie

The 2024–25 season is Connacht Rugby's fourth season in the United Rugby Championship, their 31st season of professional rugby and their 137th season of representative rugby since the foundation of the Connacht Branch of the Irish Rugby Football Union. Along with competing in the URC and its Irish Shield competition, the club also participated in the 2024-25 European Rugby Challenge Cup.

Connacht had a reduced capacity of 6,170 at The Sportsground this season as expansion works are carried out. For the first time, Connacht hosted one of their home matches, against Munster at the 25,000-seat MacHale Park gaelic games stadium in Castlebar, County Mayo.

Connacht Rugby drew an average home attendance of 7,133 in the 2024-25 URC season.

== Senior squad ==
Connacht Rugby United Rugby Championship squad (Note: Taking into account signings and departures ahead of 2024–25 season as listed on List of 2024–25 United Rugby Championship transfers.)
| **Props**: (Ireland) Jack Aungier; (Ireland) **Finlay Bealham**; (Ireland) Denis Buckley; (Ireland) Peter Dooley; (Ireland) Jordan Duggan; (Ireland) Sam Illo; (Ireland) Temi Lasisi; **Hookers**: (Ireland) Eoin de Buitléar; (Ireland) **Dave Heffernan**; (Ireland) Adam McBurney; (Ireland) Dylan Tierney-Martin; **Locks**: (Ireland) Oisín Dowling; (Ireland) Joe Joyce; (Ireland) Darragh Murray; (Ireland) Niall Murray; (Ireland) David O'Connor | **Back row**: (Ireland) **Paul Boyle**; (New Zealand) Shamus Hurley-Langton; (New Zealand) Sean Jansen*; (Ireland) Oisín McCormack; (Ireland) Seán O'Brien; (Ireland) Conor Oliver; (Ireland) **Cian Prendergast** (c); (Ireland) Josh Murphy; **Scrum-halves**: (Ireland) **Caolin Blade**; (Ireland) Colm Reilly; (Ireland) Matthew Devine; (Ireland) Ben Murphy; **Fly-halves**: (Ireland) **Jack Carty**; (Ireland) JJ Hanrahan; (Ireland) David Hawkshaw; (New Zealand) **Josh Ioane** | **Centres**: (Ireland) **Bundee Aki**; (Ireland) Cathal Forde; (Ireland) Shane Jennings; (Ireland) Hugh Gavin; **Wings**: (Ireland) **Mack Hansen**; (Australia) John Porch; (Ireland) Andrew Smith; (Australia) Byron Ralston*; (South Africa) Shayne Bolton*; **Fullbacks**: (Argentina) **Santiago Cordero**; (England) Piers O'Conor*; (Ireland) **Chay Mullins** 7s |
(c) denotes the team captain, **Bold** denotes internationally capped players including 7s.^{*} denotes players qualified to play for Ireland on residency or dual nationality.^{L} denotes a player on loan at the club.^{ST} denotes a short-term signing at the club. Players and their allocated positions from the Connacht Rugby website.

=== Academy squad ===
Connacht Rugby Academy squad (Note: Taking into account signings and departures ahead of 2024–25 season as listed on List of 2024–25 United Rugby Championship transfers.)
| **Props**: (Ireland) Billy Bohan **(1)**; (Ireland) Fiachna Barrett **(2)**; **Hookers**: (Ireland) Matthew Victory**(2)**; **Locks**: None currently named | **Back row**: (Ireland) Max Flynn **(1)**; (Ireland) Eanna McCarthy **(1)**; **Scrum-halves**: (Ireland) Tomás Farthing **(1)**; **Fly-halves**: (Ireland) Seán Naughton **(2)**; (Ireland) Harry West **(3)** | **Centres**: (Ireland) John Devine **(3)**; (Ireland) Daniel Hawkshaw **(3)**; (Ireland) Shane Mallon **(3)**; **Wings**: (Ireland) Finn Treacy **(2)**; **Fullbacks**: (Ireland) James Nicholson **(2)** |
(c) denotes the team captain, **Bold** denotes internationally capped players, number in brackets indicates players stage in the three-year academy cycle.^{*} denotes players qualified to play for Ireland on residency or dual nationality. Players and their allocated positions from the Connacht Rugby website.

== Transfers ==
=== Players in ===
- (Ireland) Matthew Devine promoted from Academy
- (Ireland) Hugh Gavin promoted from Academy
- (England) Piers O'Conor from (England) Bristol Bears
- (Ireland) Adam McBurney from (Scotland) Edinburgh
- (Ireland) David O'Connor from (England) Ealing Trailfinders
- (Ireland) Temi Lasisi from (Ireland) Leinster
- (Ireland) Ben Murphy from (Ireland) Leinster
- (Ireland) Josh Murphy returning from sabbatical
- (Ireland) Chay Mullins promoted from Academy
- (New Zealand) Josh Ioane from (New Zealand) Chiefs

=== Players out ===
- (Ireland) Diarmuid Kilgallen to (Ireland) Munster
- (Ireland) Tiernan O'Halloran retired
- (Australia) Jarrad Butler released
- (Ireland) Matthew Burke released
- (Ireland) Tadgh McElroy to (Ireland) Ulster
- (Ireland) Michael McDonald to (Ireland) Ulster (returning from season-long loan)
- (Ireland) Tom Farrell to (Ireland) Munster
- (New Zealand) Dominic Robertson-McCoy to (France) Aurillac
- (Ireland) Tom Daly to (France) Stade Niçois
- (Ireland) Oisin Michel to (England) Cornish Pirates
- (Ireland) Oran McNulty to (England) Ampthill
- (Ireland) Gavin Thornbury to (England) Northampton Saints
- (Australia) John Porch to (France) Vannes
- (Ireland) Adam McBurney to (Romania) CS Dinano București
- (Ireland) Andrew Smith to (Ireland) Munster (on loan)

== United Rugby Championship ==
=== Main table ===
| Pos | Team | Pld | W | D | L | PF | PA | PD | TF | TA | TB | LB | Pts | Qualification |
|---|---|---|---|---|---|---|---|---|---|---|---|---|---|---|
| 1 | Leinster (CH) | 18 | 16 | 0 | 2 | 542 | 256 | +286 | 79 | 35 | 11 | 1 | 76 | Qualifies for home URC quarter-final; Qualification for the 2025–26 Champions Cup |
| 2 | Bulls (RU) | 18 | 14 | 0 | 4 | 542 | 361 | +181 | 71 | 44 | 9 | 3 | 68 | Qualifies for home URC quarter-final; Qualification for the 2025–26 Champions Cup |
| 3 | Sharks | 18 | 13 | 0 | 5 | 436 | 402 | +34 | 55 | 59 | 7 | 3 | 62 | Qualifies for home URC quarter-final; Qualification for the 2025–26 Champions Cup |
| 4 | Glasgow Warriors | 18 | 11 | 0 | 7 | 468 | 327 | +141 | 70 | 40 | 10 | 5 | 59 | Qualifies for home URC quarter-final; Qualification for the 2025–26 Champions Cup |
| 5 | Stormers | 18 | 10 | 0 | 8 | 507 | 418 | +89 | 66 | 57 | 11 | 4 | 55 | Qualifies for URC quarter-final; Qualification for the 2025–26 Champions Cup |
| 6 | Munster | 18 | 9 | 0 | 9 | 444 | 429 | +15 | 67 | 59 | 11 | 4 | 51 | Qualifies for URC quarter-final; Qualification for the 2025–26 Champions Cup |
| 7 | Edinburgh | 18 | 8 | 1 | 9 | 471 | 407 | +64 | 66 | 57 | 9 | 6 | 49 | Qualifies for URC quarter-final; Qualification for the 2025–26 Champions Cup |
| 8 | Scarlets | 18 | 9 | 1 | 8 | 427 | 382 | +45 | 50 | 52 | 6 | 4 | 48 | Qualifies for URC quarter-final; Qualification for the 2025–26 Champions Cup |
| 9 | Cardiff | 18 | 8 | 1 | 9 | 409 | 477 | −68 | 63 | 65 | 10 | 3 | 47 | Qualification for the 2025–26 Challenge Cup |
| 10 | Benetton | 18 | 9 | 1 | 8 | 393 | 478 | −85 | 50 | 65 | 7 | 1 | 46 | Qualification for the 2025–26 Challenge Cup |
| 11 | Lions | 18 | 8 | 0 | 10 | 402 | 440 | −38 | 53 | 60 | 5 | 3 | 40 | Qualification for the 2025–26 Challenge Cup |
| 12 | Ospreys | 18 | 7 | 1 | 10 | 437 | 454 | −17 | 60 | 63 | 6 | 4 | 40 | Qualification for the 2025–26 Challenge Cup |
| 13 | Connacht | 18 | 6 | 0 | 12 | 420 | 472 | −52 | 64 | 62 | 9 | 6 | 39 | Qualification for the 2025–26 Challenge Cup |
| 14 | Ulster | 18 | 7 | 0 | 11 | 414 | 506 | −92 | 59 | 72 | 5 | 5 | 38 | Qualification for the 2025–26 Challenge Cup |
| 15 | Zebre Parma | 18 | 5 | 1 | 12 | 302 | 503 | −201 | 38 | 72 | 3 | 4 | 29 | Qualification for the 2025–26 Challenge Cup |
| 16 | Dragons | 18 | 1 | 0 | 17 | 335 | 637 | −302 | 43 | 92 | 1 | 4 | 9 | Qualification for the 2025–26 Challenge Cup |

Source: UnitedRugby.com
Rules for classification: Tiebreakers for teams tied on points: 1) Number of matches won 2) The difference between points for and points against 3) The number of tries scored 4) The most points scored 5) The difference between tries for and tries against 6) The fewest red cards received 7) The fewest yellow cards received.

=== Results ===
| 21 September 2024 | (1 BP) Munster (Ireland) | 35–33 | (Ireland) Connacht (2 BP) | Thomond Park, Limerick |
| 17:30 | Try: Nankivell 28' c Haley 31' c Hodnett 44' c Coombes 58' c Daly 69' c Con: Burns (3/3) 28', 32', 45'; Butler (2/2) 59', 70' | | Try: Ioane 13' m B. Murphy (2) 20' c, 39' c Hawkshaw 53' c Forde 63' c Con: Ioane (3/4) 21', 54', 64'; Forde 40' (1/1) | Attendance: 15,705; Referee: Chris Busby (Ireland) |

| 28 September 2024 | (1 BP) Connacht (Ireland) | 36–30 | (South Africa) Sharks (1 BP) | The Sportsground, Galway |
| 19:35 | Try: Heffernan (2) 3' c, 50' m Forde 42' c Jennings 54' c Dowling 70' c Con: Ioane (1/1) 4'; Forde (3/4) 43', 55', 71'; Pen: Forde (1) 79' | | Try: Esterhuizen (2) 21' c, 28' c Grobler 37' c Con: Masuku (3/3) 22', 30', 39'; Pen: Jo. Hendrikse (2) 24', 34'; Masuku 80'+1 | Attendance: 4,217; Referee: Federico Vedovelli (Italy) |

| 4 October 2024 | (1 BP) Scarlets (Wales) | 23–24 | (Ireland) Connacht | Parc y Scarlets, Llanelli |
| 19:35 | Try: G. Davies (2) 21' c, 29' c Con: Costelow (2/2) 22', 30'; Pen: Costelow (2) 42', 73'; Lloyd 52' | | Try: O'Conor 9' c Hansen 15' c J. Murphy 37' c Con: Carty (3/3) 10', 16', 38'; Pen: Forde 77' | Attendance: 5,080; Referee: Marius van der Westhuizen (South Africa) |

| 12 October 2024 | (1 BP) Ulster (Ireland) | 32–27 | (Ireland) Connacht (2 BP) | Ravenhill Stadium, Belfast |
| 20:00 | Try: Andrew 2' c Postlethwaite 20' m Cooney 27' c McCann 49' m Timoney 75' m Con: Cooney (2/5) 3', 28'; Pen: Cooney 71' | | Try: Bolton 10' m Joyce 30' m B. Murphy 40' c Tierney-Martin 60' c Con: Ioane (2/4) 42', 62'; Pen: Ioane 79' | Referee: Andrew Brace (Ireland) |

| 19 October 2024 | Connacht (Ireland) | 12–33 | (Ireland) Leinster (1 BP) | The Sportsground, Galway |
| 19:35 | Try: O'Brien 33' m Forde 64' c Con: Ioane (1/2) 64' | | Try: J. Osborne 5' c Turner 15' c Snyman 38' c Deegan 45' m A. Osborne 65' c Con: Frawley 6' (1/1); R. Byrne (3/4) 16', 40', 66' | Attendance: 6,117; Referee: Eoghan Cross, Ireland |

| 26 October 2024 | (1 BP) Connacht (Ireland) | 31–7 | (Wales) Dragons | The Sportsground, Galway |
| 19:35 | Try: Boyle 5' c Blade 19' c Prendergast 38' m Forde 73' c Devine 80' m Con: Forde (3/5) 7', 20', 74' | | Try: Basham 77' c Con: O'Brien 78' | Attendance: 3,128; Referee: Gianluca Gnecchi, Italy |

| 30 November 2024 | Connacht (Ireland) | 14–28 | (South Africa) Bulls (1 BP) | The Sportsground, Galway |
| 17:30 | Try: Hawkshaw 61' c Blade 74'c Con: Forde (2/2) 62', 75' | | Try: de Klerk 5' c Papier 35' c Kriel 41' c Moodie 54' c Con: Goosen (4/4) 6', 37', 42', 55' | Attendance: 3.109; Referee: Mike Adamson (Scotland) |

| 21 December 2024 | Leinster (Ireland) | 20–12 | (Ireland) Connacht | Aviva Stadium, Dublin |
| 17:30 | Try: A. Osbourne 19' c Tector 26' c Con: R. Byrne (2/2) 19', 27'; Pen: R. Byrne (2) 42', 79' | Report | Try: Dowling 52' m Jennings 60' c Con: Forde (1/2) 60' | Attendance: 33,963; Referee: Chris Busby (SCO) |

| 28 December 2024 | Connacht (Ireland) | 7-17 | (Ireland) Ulster | The Sportsground, Galway |
| 19:35 | Try: Hansen 35' c Con: Carty (1/1) 36' | Report | Try: O'Sullivan 10' c Timoney 54' c Con: Doak (2/2) 11', 55'; Pen: Doak 14' | Attendance: 6,129; Referee: Andrew Brace |

| 24 January 2025 | Glasgow Warriors (Scotland) | 22-19 | (Ireland) Connacht (1 BP) | Scotstoun Stadium, Glasgow |
| 19:35 | Try: Cancelliere 21’ Afshar 31’ Cancelliere57’ Con: Weir (2); Pen: Weir | | Try: Hawkshaw 18', 41; O'Conor 77'; Con: Hanrahan (2) | Attendance: 6,277 |

| 15 February 2025 | '(1 BP)' Connacht (Ireland) | 24–19 | (Wales) Cardiff (1BP) | The Sportsground, Galway |
| 19:35 | Try: Murphy, 7'c Hurley-Langton, 17'c Heffernan, 47'; Tierney-Martin, 75; Con: Ioane (2) | Report | Try: Lee-Lo, 52'c Donnell, 63'; Braley, 69'c Con: Sheedy (2) | Attendance: 3,648 |

| 1 March 2025 | (1 BP) Connacht (Ireland) | 38-30 | (Italy) Benetton | The Sportsground, Galway |
| 19:35 | Try: Treacy, 5'c Bolton, 12' 66'; Boyle, 38'c Hurley-Langton, 47'c Devine, 72'c Con: Ioane (3); Hanrahan | Report | Try: Mendy, 19'c Uren, 25'c Zaron 30'c Con: Albornoz (3); Pen: Albornoz, 16', 34', 59' | Attendance: 4,217 |

| 22 March 2025 | (1 BP) Ospreys (Wales) | 43-40 | (Ireland) Connacht (2 BP) | Swansea.com Stadium, Swansea |
| 17:15 | Try: Giles, 16'c, 32'c Hardy, 34'c Kasende, 35'c, 56'; Walsh, 43'c Con: Edwards (5/6); Pen: Edwards, 4' | Report | Try: Treacy, 1'c Hurley-Langton, 13'c, 69'; Heffernan, 47'c O'Conor, 48'c Murphy, 67'c Con: Ioane (2/2); JJ Hanrahan (3/4) | Attendance: 3,416 |

| 29 March 2025 | (2 BP) Connacht (Ireland) | 24-30 | (Ireland) Munster (1 BP) | MacHale Park, Castlebar, County Mayo |
| 14:30 | Try: Jansen, 21', 62'; Blade, 45'; Ioane, 73'; Con: Ioane, 45'; Hanrahan, 63' | Report:ESPN | Try: Ahern, 24', Casey, 23'; Crowley, 51'; Barron, 59'; Con: Crowley, 52', 13'; Pen: Crowley, 7', 38' | Attendance: 27,580 |

| 19 April 2025 | (1 BP)Stormers (South Africa) | 34-29 | (Ireland) Connacht (2 BP) | Cape Town Stadium, Cape Town |
| 16:00 | Try: Feinberg-Mngomezulu, 3', 19', 26'; Roos. 14'; Hartzenberg, 48'; Con: Feinberg-Mngomezulu, 4', 15', 20; Pen: Feinberg-Mngomezulu, 72' | | Try: Jennings, 7', 41'; Oliver, 17'; Tierney-Martin, 36'; Murphy, 66'; Con: Carty, 8', 18' | Attendance: 18,211; Referee: Sam Grove-White |

| 26 April 2025 | Lions (South Africa) | 26 – 7 | (Ireland) Connacht | Ellis Park Stadium, Johannesburg |
| 16:00 | Try: du Plessis, 14'; Pretorius, 70' v.d. Merwe, 83'; Con: Dobela, 84; Pen: Wolhuter, 19', 37', 43' | Report, 2 | Try: de Buitlear, 74'; Con: Hawkshaw, 74 | Attendance: 3,454; Referee: Hollie Davidson |

| 10 May 2025 | Connacht (Ireland) | 21–31 | (Scotland) Edinburgh (1 BP) | The Sportsground, Galway |
| 19:35 | Try: Finn Treacy, 42', 52'; Con: JJ Hanrahan, 42', 53' | | Try: Schoeman, 8'; Watson, 27'; Muncaster, 58'; Con: Thompson, 9', 28' | Attendance: 6,056 |

| 17 May 2025 | Zebre Parma (Italy) | 12 –22 | (Ireland) Connacht | Stadio Sergio Lanfranchi, Parma |
| 18:00 | Try: Stavile, 37'; Trulla, 70'; Con: Montemauri, 38' | Report | Try: Prendergast, 17'; Bolton, 28'; Hurley-Langton, 61'; Con: Hanrahan, 18', 61'; Pen: Hanrahan, 79' | Attendance: 3,931 |

Connacht are eliminated from the competition.

== URC Irish Shield ==
2024–25 United Rugby Championship Regional Shield Pools
(Ireland) Irish Shield
| | Team | P | W | D | L | PF | PA | PD | TF | TA | TBP | LBP | Pts | Pos overall |
| 1 | (Ireland) Leinster (S) | 6 | 6 | 0 | 0 | 175 | 80 | +95 | 26 | 11 | 5 | 0 | 29 | 1 |
| 2 | (Ireland) Munster | 6 | 4 | 0 | 2 | 144 | 150 | –6 | 22 | 22 | 4 | 0 | 20 | 6 |
| 3 | (Ireland) Ulster | 6 | 2 | 0 | 4 | 125 | 162 | –37 | 16 | 26 | 1 | 2 | 11 | 14 |
| 4 | (Ireland) Connacht | 6 | 0 | 0 | 6 | 115 | 167 | –52 | 18 | 23 | 3 | 3 | 6 | 13 |
If teams are level at any stage, tiebreakers are applied in the following order: 1. number of matches won 2. the difference between points for and points against 3. the number of tries scored 4. the most points scored 5. the difference between tries for and tries against 6. the fewest red cards received 7. the fewest yellow cards received
Green background indicates teams currently leading the regional shield. Upon the conclusion of the regular season, these teams win their respective regional shields. (S) : URC Shield champion

| 21 September 2024 | (1 BP) Munster (Ireland) | 35–33 | (Ireland) Connacht (2 BP) | Thomond Park, Limerick |
| 17:30 | Try: Nankivell 28' c Haley 31' c Hodnett 44' c Coombes 58' c Daly 69' c Con: Burns (3/3) 28', 32', 45'; Butler (2/2) 59', 70' | | Try: Ioane 13' m B. Murphy (2) 20' c, 39' c Hawkshaw 53' c Forde 63' c Con: Ioane (3/4) 21', 54', 64'; Forde 40' (1/1) | Attendance: 15,705; Referee: Chris Busby (Ireland) |

| 12 October 2024 | (1 BP) Ulster (Ireland) | 32–27 | (Ireland) Connacht (2 BP) | Ravenhill Stadium, Belfast |
| 20:00 | Try: Andrew 2' c Postlethwaite 20' m Cooney 27' c McCann 49' m Timoney 75' m Con: Cooney (2/5) 3', 28'; Pen: Cooney 71' | | Try: Bolton 10' m Joyce 30' m B. Murphy 40' c Tierney-Martin 60' c Con: Ioane (2/4) 42', 62'; Pen: Ioane 79' | Referee: Andrew Brace (Ireland) |

| 19 October 2024 | Connacht (Ireland) | 12–33 | (Ireland) Leinster (1 BP) | The Sportsground, Galway |
| 19:35 | Try: O'Brien 33' m Forde 64' c Con: Ioane (1/2) 64' | | Try: J. Osborne 5' c Turner 15' c Snyman 38' c Deegan 45' m A. Osborne 65' c Con: Frawley 6' (1/1); R. Byrne (3/4) 16', 40', 66' | Attendance: 6,117; Referee: Eoghan Cross, Ireland |

| 21 December 2024 | Leinster (Ireland) | 20–12 | (Ireland) Connacht | Aviva Stadium, Dublin |
| 17:30 | Try: A. Osbourne 19' c Tector 26' c Con: R. Byrne (2/2) 19', 27'; Pen: R. Byrne (2) 42', 79' | Report | Try: Dowling 52' m Jennings 60' c Con: Forde (1/2) 60' | Attendance: 33,963; Referee: Chris Busby (SCO) |

| 28 December 2024 | Connacht (Ireland) | 7-17 | (Ireland) Ulster | The Sportsground, Galway |
| 19:35 | Try: Hansen 35' c Con: Carty (1/1) 36' | Report | Try: O'Sullivan 10' c Timoney 54' c Con: Doak (2/2) 11', 55'; Pen: Doak 14' | Attendance: 6,129; Referee: Andrew Brace |

| 29 March 2025 | (2 BP) Connacht (Ireland) | 24-30 | (Ireland) Munster (1 BP) | MacHale Park, Castlebar, County Mayo |
| 14:30 | Try: Jansen, 21', 62'; Blade, 45'; Ioane, 73'; Con: Ioane, 45'; Hanrahan, 63' | Report:ESPN | Try: Ahern, 24', Casey, 23'; Crowley, 51'; Barron, 59'; Con: Crowley, 52', 13'; Pen: Crowley, 7', 38' | Attendance: 27,580 |

== Challenge Cup ==
EPCR Challenge Cup Pool 1
| Pos | Team | Pld | W | D | L | PF | PA | PD | TF | TA | TB | LB | Pts | Qualification |
|---|---|---|---|---|---|---|---|---|---|---|---|---|---|---|
| 1 | (Ireland) Connacht (1) | 4 | 4 | 0 | 0 | 154 | 73 | +81 | 25 | 10 | 4 | 0 | 20 | Home round of 16 |
| 2 | (France) Lyon (5) | 4 | 3 | 0 | 1 | 150 | 118 | +32 | 21 | 19 | 2 | 0 | 14 | Home round of 16 |
| 3 | (France) Perpignan (8) | 4 | 2 | 1 | 1 | 100 | 92 | +8 | 12 | 14 | 1 | 0 | 11 | Home round of 16 |
| 4 | (Wales) Cardiff (16) | 4 | 1 | 0 | 3 | 91 | 98 | −7 | 13 | 13 | 2 | 1 | 7 | Away round of 16 |
| 5 | (South Africa) Cheetahs | 4 | 1 | 1 | 2 | 73 | 132 | −59 | 10 | 19 | 0 | 0 | 6 | |
| 6 | (Italy) Zebre Parma | 4 | 0 | 0 | 4 | 70 | 125 | −55 | 10 | 17 | 0 | 2 | 2 | |

Source: EPCR
Rules for classification: Tiebreakers for teams tied on points: 1) Number of matches won; 2) Difference between points for and against; 3) Total number of points for; 4) Aggregate number of points scored in matches between tied teams; 5) Number of matches won excluding the first match, then the second and so on until the tie is settled.

=== Pool matches ===
| 7 December 2024 | (1 BP) Connacht (Ireland) | 43–12 | (Italy) Zebre Parma | The Sportsground, Galway |
| 20:00 | Try: Mullins (3) 22' m, 28' c, 62' m Tierney-Martin 34' m Boyle (2) 42' c, 80' c Cordero 70' c Con: Carty (2/4) 29', 43'; Naughton (2/3) 71', 80' | Report | Try: Stavile 6' m Fusco 75' c Con: Da Re (1/2) 76' | Attendance: 2,672; Referee: Adam Jones (Wales) |

| 15 December 2024 | Perpignan (France) | 18–31 | (Ireland) Connacht (1 BP) | Stade Aimé Giral, Perpignan |
| 14:00 | Try: Boyer-Gallardo 17' m Joseph 50' c Con: Aucagne (1/2) 51'; Pen: Aucagne (2/3) 27', 44' | Report | Try: Ralston 6' c de Buitléar 10' c Mullins 36' m Boyle 57' c McBurney 78' m Con: Carty (3/5) 7', 11', 57' | Attendance: 8,092; Referee: Sara Cox (England) |

| 11 January 2025 | (1 BP) Connacht (Ireland) | 52–24 | (France) Lyon | The Sportsground, Galway |
| 20:00 | Try: B. Murphy (3) 1' c, 38' m, 45' m Jansen 14' m Bealham 17' c J. Murphy 41' m Aungier 53' m Tierney-Martin 72' m Hurley-Langton 80+3' m Con: Ioane (2/6) 2', 18'; Pen: Ioane (1/1) 34' | Report | Try: Matavesi 23' c Regard 48' c Marchand 68' c Con: Page-Relo (1/1) 24'; Meliande (2/2) 49', 69'; Pen: Page-Relo (1/1) 11' | Attendance: 4,024; Referee: Hollie Davidson (Scotland) |

| 17 January 2025 | Cardiff (Wales) | 19–28 | (Ireland) Connacht (1 BP) | Cardiff Arms Park, Cardiff |
| 20:00 | Try: Lloyd 17' c Young (2) 42' c, 58' m Con: Ben Thomas (2/3) 18', 43' | Report | Try: J. Murphy 13' c Joyce 36' c Ralston 53' c Devine 65' c Con: Ioane (3/3) 13', 37', 54'; Hanranhan (1/1) 66' | Attendance: 6,321; Referee: Morné Ferreira (South Africa) |

=== Knock-out phase ===
Round of 16
3 | (Scotland) Edinburgh | 24
14 | (South Africa) Lions | 12
6 | (France) Bayonne | 22
11 | (South Africa) Bulls | 32
7 | (France) Pau | 24
10 | (England) Bath Rugby | 49
2 | (France) Montpellier | 17
15 | (England) Gloucester | 24
4 | (Wales) Ospreys | 36
13 | (Wales) Scarlets | 14
5 | (France) Lyon | 34
12 | (South Africa) Sharks | 21
1 | (Ireland) Connacht | 35
16 | (Wales) Cardiff | 20
8 | (France) Perpignan | 18
9 | (France) Racing 92 | 24

Quarter-finals
3 | (Scotland) Edinburgh | 34
11 | (South Africa) Bulls | 28
10 | (England) Bath Rugby | 61
15 | (England) Gloucester | 26
4 | (Wales) Ospreys | 18
5 | (France) Lyon | 20
1 | (Ireland) Connacht | 40
9 | (France) Racing 92 | 43

Semi-finals
3 | (Scotland) Edinburgh | 24
10 | (England) Bath Rugby | 39
5 | (France) Lyon | 29
9 | (France) Racing 92 | 15

Final
10 | (England) Bath Rugby | 37
5 | (France) Lyon | 12

==== Round of 16 ====
Connacht finished as the highest ranked side in the pool stages of the Challenge Cup, winning home field advantage for every round of the competition until the final. In the round of 16, they face the 16th seeded Cardiff Rugby.

| 5 April 2025 | Connacht (Ireland) (1) | 35–20 | (16) (Wales) Cardiff | The Sportsground, Galway |
| 20:00 | Try: Divine 2' c Jansen 40+4' c Treacy 44' c Bolton 66' c Boyle, 76' c Con: Hanrahan (3/3) 4', 45', 42'; Ioane (2/2) 66', 77' | Report | Try: Lee-Lo 37' m Thomas 53' c Adams 60' m Con: Thomas; Pen: Sheedy (1/2) 12' | Attendance: 4,217; Referee: Luc Ramos (France) |

==== Quarterfinal ====
| 12 April 2025 | Connacht (Ireland) (1) | 40-43 | (9) (France) Racing 92 | The Sportsground, Galway |
| 20:00 | Try: Aki, 2’ C Prendergast, 8’, 29' penalty try, 22'; Murphy, 72'; Forde, 77'; Con: JJ Hanrahan, (4/5) 3' 9', 30', 79' | Report | Try: Naituvi, 5'; Escobar, 18'; Le Garrec, 24', 48'; Tuisova, 33'; Con: Lancaster, (2/4) 22', 33'; Le Garrec, (1/1) 49'; Pen: Lancaster, 42'; Le Garrec, 46', 64'; Drop: O Farrell, 53'; (red card) 22', Naituvi (dangerous play) | Attendance: 6,217; Referee: Christophe Ridley (England) |

Connacht are eliminated from the competition.

== Home attendance ==
End of Season.

| Domestic League | | | | | | EPRC Challenge Cup | | | | | | Total | |
| League | Fixtures | Total Attendance | Average Attendance | Highest | Lowest | League | Fixtures | Total Attendance | Average Attendance | Highest | Lowest | Total Attendance | Average Attendance |
| 2024–25 United Rugby Championship | 9 | 64,201 | 7,133 | 27,580 | 3,470 | 2024–25 European Rugby Challenge Cup | 4 | 17,042 | 4,261 | 6,129 | 2,672 | 81,243 | 6,753 |
