= 2025–26 Connacht Rugby season =

Connacht Rugby
- 2025–26 season
- Head coach: Stuart Lancaster
- Chief executive: Willie Ruane
- United Rugby Championship: Quarter-final (8th, regular season)
- Challenge Cup: Quarter-final
- URC Irish Shield: 4th
- Top try scorer: League: Sean Jansen (10)
- Top points scorer: League: Sam Gilbert (90)
- Highest home attendance: 12,482 (v Leinster, Rd 10 URC)
- Lowest home attendance: 3,928
- Average home attendance: 6,415

The 2025–26 season is Connacht Rugby's fifth season in the United Rugby Championship, their 32nd season of professional rugby and their 138th season of representative rugby since the foundation of the Connacht Branch of the Irish Rugby Football Union. Along with competing in the URC and its Irish Shield competition, the club will also participate in the 2025–26 EPCR Challenge Cup.

In the women's game, Connacht will compete in the 2025 Vodafone Inter-Provincial Championship.

== Connacht Men ==
=== Senior squad ===
Connacht Rugby senior squad
**Prop**: (Ireland) Denis Buckley, 34; (Ireland) **Finlay Bealham**, 33; (Ireland) Peter Dooley, 30; (Ireland) Jordan Duggan, 27; (Ireland) **Jack Aungier**, 26; (Ireland) Sam Illo, 24; (Ireland) Temi Lasisi, 24; (Ireland) Fiachna Barrett, 22; (Ireland) Billy Bohan, 19; **Hooker**: (Ireland) **Dave Heffernan**, 34; (Ireland) Dylan Tierney-Martin, 26; (Ireland) Eoin de Buitléar, 23; (Ireland) Matthew Victory, 22; **Lock**: (Ireland) Joe Joyce, 31; (Ireland) Josh Murphy, 30; (Ireland) David O'Connor, 30; (Ireland) Oisín Dowling, 28; (Ireland) Niall Murray, 25; (Ireland) **Darragh Murray**, 24	**Back row**: (Ireland) **Paul Boyle**, 28; (New Zealand) Sean Jansen, 26; (Ireland) **Cian Prendergast**, 25; (New Zealand) Shamus Hurley-Langton, 25; (Ireland) Seán O'Brien, 24; **Scrum-half**: (Ireland) **Caolin Blade**, 31; (Ireland) **Ben Murphy**, 24; (Ireland) Matthew Devine, 23; (Ireland) Albert Lindner, 19; **Fly-half**: (Ireland) **Jack Carty**, 32; (New Zealand) **Josh Ioane**, 29; (Ireland) Seán Naughton, 20	**Centre**: (Ireland) **Bundee Aki**, 35; (Ireland) David Hawkshaw, 26; (Ireland) Cathal Forde, 24; (Ireland) John Devine, 21; (Ireland) **Hugh Gavin**, 21; (Ireland) Finn Treacy, 20; **Winger**: (New Zealand) Sam Gilbert, 26; (Australia) Byron Ralston, 25; (Ireland) **Shayne Bolton**, 25; (Ireland) Shane Jennings, 24; **Fullback**: (Ireland) **Mack Hansen**, 27; (Ireland) Chay Mullins, 23; (Ireland) James Nicholson, 22; (Ireland) Harry West, 22
(c) denotes the team captain, **Bold** denotes internationally capped players.^{*} denotes players qualified to play for Ireland on residency or dual nationality.^{ST} denotes a short-term signing.^{L} denotes a player on loan at the club. Players and their allocated positions from the Connacht Rugby website.

=== Players in ===
- (New Zealand) Sam Gilbert from (New Zealand) Highlanders
- (Ireland) Harry West (promoted from Academy)
- (Ireland) Finn Treacy (promoted from Academy)
- (Ireland) John Devine (promoted from Academy)

=== Players out ===
- (Ireland) JJ Hanrahan to (Ireland) Munster
- (Ireland) Andrew Smith to (Ireland) Munster
- (England) Piers O'Conor to (Scotland) Edinburgh
- (Ireland) Conor Oliver to (England) Ealing Trailfinders
- (Argentina) Santiago Cordero to (Argentina) Regatas

=== United Rugby Championship ===
==== Matches ====
27 September 2025	**(1 BP) Connacht (Ireland)**	**26–15**	**(Italy) Benetton**	The Sportsground, Galway
19:45	Try: Ioane 8' c Sean Naughton 19' m Tierney-Martin 46' c Jansen 73' c Con: Forde (3) 9', 47', 74'; Cards: Mullins (yellow card) 26'	Report	Try: Louis Lynagh 41' m Garbisi 80+1'; Con: Umaga 80+2'; Pen: Umaga 16'; Cards: Fekitoa (yellow card) 8'; Lamaro (yellow card) 44'	Attendance: 3,928; Referee: Christopher Allison

11 October 2025	**Cardiff (Wales)**	**14–8**	**(Ireland) Connacht (1 BP)**	Cardiff Arms Park
19:45	Try: Bowen (2) 14' c, 75' c Con: Sheedy 15'; Lloyd 76'	Report	Try: O'Connor 80+2'; Pen: Forde 11'	Attendance: 7,092; Referee: Gianluca Gnecchi (Italy)

17 October 2025	**(1 BP) Connacht (Ireland)**	**27–28**	**(South Africa) Bulls**	The Sportsground, Galway
19:45	Try: Ioane 10' c Blade 45' c Naughton 68' m Hansen 79' m Con: Ioane (2) 11', 46'; Pen: Naughton 74'; Cards: Murphy (red card) 19'	report	Try: De Wet (2) 13' m, 54' c Le Roux 20' c Con: Johannes (2) 21', 55'; Pen: Johannes (2) 63', 72'; Drop: Johannes 43'	Attendance: 3,928; Referee: Mike Adamson (Scotland)

25 October 2025	**Munster (Ireland)**	**17–15**	**(Ireland) Connacht (1 BP)**	Thomond Park, Limerick
19:45	Try: O'Donoghue (2) 15' m, 67' m Kilgallen 33' c Con: JJ Hanrahan 33'	Report	Try: Ralston (2) 20' m, 28' m Boyle 42' m	Attendance: 16,512; Referee: Andrea Piardi (Italy)

29 November 2025	**(1 BP) Connacht (Ireland)**	**44–17**	**(South Africa) Sharks**	The Sportsground, Galway
19:45	Try: Boyle 17' c Mullins 31' c Gavin 58' c Devine 72' c Illo 79' c Con: Naughton (5) 19', 32', 58', 73', 80'; Pen: Naughton (3) 8', 27', 42'	Report	Try: Mbatha 15' m Mapimpi 66' m Van Heerden 75' c Con: Jordan Hendrikse 75'; Cards: Jenkins (yellow card) 28'	Attendance: 3,928; Referee: Ben Whitehouse (Wales)

20 December 2025	**(1 BP) Dragons (Wales)**	**48–28**	**(Ireland) Connacht (1 BP)**	Rodney Parade, Newport
19:45	Try: Burrows 17' c Hope (2) 25' c, 61' c Rosser 32' c penalty try 40'+4; Dyer 51' c Con: O'Brien (5/5) 18', 26', 33', 52', 62'; Pen: O'Brien (2/2) 43' , 46'	Report	Try: Gilbert 0' c Prendergast (2) 66' c, 74' c Jansen 80+2' c Con: Gilbert (4) 1', 67', 75', 80+3'; Cards: Boyle (yellow card) 40+5'	Attendance: 4,188; Referee: Ruairidh Campbell (Scotland)

27 December 2025	**(1 BP) Connacht (Ireland)**	**24–29**	**(Ireland) Ulster (1 BP)**	The Sportsground, Galway
17:30	Try: Treacy 24' c Jansen 66' c Devine 77' c Con: Gilbert (3) 25', 67', 77'; Pen: Gilbert 31'; Cards: Aki (yellow card) 43'; Joyce (yellow card) 51'	Report	Try: Zac Ward (2) 34' c, 41' m Kok 47' c penalty try 53'; Con: Jack Murphy (2/3) 34', 48'; Cards: Jack Murphy (yellow card) 16'; McCloskey (yellow card) 43'	Attendance: 3,928; Referee: Eoghan Cross (Ireland)

3 January 2026	**(1 BP) Leinster (Ireland)**	**52–17**	**(Ireland) Connacht**	Aviva Stadium, Dublin
17:30	Try: Sheehan 4' c Tector (2) 8' c, 62' c Prendergast 39' m Deeny 44' c O'Brien (2) 52' c, 67' c Kenny 75'; Con: Prendergast (6/8) 5', 8', 45', 52', 63', 67'; Cards: Joe McCarthy (yellow card) 26'	Report	Try: Tierney-Martin 19' c Bealham 36' c Con: Gilbert (2/2) 20', 37'; Pen: Gilbert 28'	Attendance: 21,422; Referee: Andrew Brace (Ireland)

24 January 2026	**Connacht (Ireland)**	**23–34**	**(Ireland) Leinster (1 BP)**	The Sportsground, Galway
17:30	Try: Tierney-Martin 12' c West 48' c Con: Gilbert (2/2) 13', 49'; Pen: Gilbert (3) 23', 33', 67'	Report	Try: Gunne 8' c RG Snyman 57' c Tector 60' c Frawley 70' c Con: Byrne (4/4) 9', 58', 61', 71'; Pen: Byrne (2) 27' 31'	Attendance: 12,481; Referee: Eoghan Cross (Ireland)

31 January 2026	**Zebre Parma (Italy)**	**15–31**	**(Ireland) Connacht (1 BP)**	Stadio Sergio Lanfranchi, Parma
15:00	Try: Garcia 56' m Stavile 74' c Con: Martin Roger 75'; Pen: Roger 26'; Cards: Garcia (yellow card) 60'; Zanon (yellow card) 80+10'	Report	Try: Joyce 41'; Jansen (2) 50' c, 61' c McCormack 80+11'; Con: Gilbert (4/4) 42', 51', 62', 80+12'; Pen: Gilbert 78'; Cards: Mullins (yellow card) 73'	Attendance: 2,545; Referee: Ben Whitehouse (Wales)

28 February 2026	**Connacht (Ireland)**	**15–10**	**(Scotland) Glasgow Warriors (1 BP)**	The Sportsground, Galway
15:00	Try: J Murphy 74' c Jansen 80+1' m Con: Gilbert 75'; Pen: Gilbert 25'; Cards: Joyce (yellow card) 63'	Report	Try: Rowe (2) 62' m, 67' m	Attendance: 8,654; Referee: Ben Breakspear

13 March 2026	**(1 BP) Connacht (Ireland)**	**31–14**	**(Wales) Scarlets**	The Sportsground, Galway
19:45	Try: Jansen (2) 16' c, 37' m Aungier 46' c Barrett 57' m de Buitlear 69' c Con: Naughton (3) 17', 47', 70'	Report	Try: Roberts 49' c Jones 53' c Con: Leggatt-Jones (2/2) 50', 54'	Attendance: 5,649; Referee: Ruairidh Campbell (Scotland)

20 March 2026	**(1 BP) Ulster (Ireland)**	**19–26**	**(Ireland) Connacht (1 BP)**	Ravenhill Stadium, Belfast
19:45	Try: Doak 24' c Zac Ward 65' m Bell 76' c Con: Doak 25'; Jack Murphy 76'	Report	Try: Jansen 19' c Bealham 57' c Treacy (2) 61' m, 68' c Con: Naughton (3/4) 20', 58', 70'; Cards: Bealham (yellow card) 38'	Attendance: 12,000; Referee: Mike Adamson (Scotland)

28 March 2026	**Connacht (Ireland)**	**21–14**	**(Wales) Ospreys (1 BP)**	The Sportsground, Galway
14:15	Try: Hurley-Langton (2) 11' c, 45' c Devine 74' c Con: Naughton (3/3) 12', 46', 75'; Cards: Murray (yellow card) 48'	Report	Try: Kasende 23' c L Morgan 56' c Con: D Edwards (2/2) 24', 57'; Cards: J Morgan (yellow card) 72'	Attendance: 7,943; Referee: Matteo Liperini (Italy)

18 April 2026	**Stormers (South Africa)**	**24–33**	**(Ireland) Connacht (1 BP)**	Cape Town Stadium
13:45	Try: Roos 14' c Mchunu 47' c Feinberg-Mngomezulu 62' c Con: Feinberg-Mngomezulu (3/3) 14', 48', 63'; Pen: Feinberg-Mngomezulu 41'; Cards: Fourie (yellow card) 4'	Report	Try: Hurley-Langton 7' c Boyle 51' c Devine 64' m Murphy 70' c Naughton 78' c Con: Gilbert (3/4) 7', 71', 79'; Naughton 51'	Attendance: 13,903; Referee: Federico Vedovelli (Italy)

25 April 2026	**(1 BP) Lions (South Africa)**	**33–21**	**(Ireland) Connacht**	Ellis Park Stadium, Johannesburg
15:00	Try: Davids 5' c van Wyk (2) 22' c, 72' m Mahashe 40' c Cronjé 44' c Con: CW Smith (4/5) 6', 23', 41', 45'; Cards: SJ Kotze (yellow card) 47'	Report, 2	Try: M Devine (2) 49' c, 77' c Boyle 81' c Con: Gilbert (3/3) 49', 77', 82'	Attendance: 6,881; Referee: Filippo Russo (Italy)

9 May 2026	**(1 BP) Connacht (Ireland)**	**26–7**	**(Ireland) Munster**	The Sportsground, Galway
19:45	Try: B Murphy 13' c Bolton 21' m Hurley-Langton 34' c Jansen 72' c Con: Gilbert (3/4) 13', 35', 73'	Report	Try: Casey 68' c Con: Hanrahan 69'; Cards: Barron (red card) 16'	Attendance: 12,481; Referee: Peter Martin (Ireland)

15 May 2026	**Edinburgh (Scotland)**	**5–26**	**(Ireland) Connacht (1 BP)**	Edinburgh Rugby Stadium
19:45	Try: Ashman 72'	Report	Try: Ioane 24' m Hurley-Langton (2) 36' c, 43' c Devine 60' c Con: Gilbert (3/4) 36', 44', 61'	Attendance: 7,778; Referee: Aimee Barrett-Theron (South Africa)

==== Table ====
Pos	Team	Pld	W	D	L	PF	PA	PD	TF	TA	TB	LB	Pts	Qualification
1	Glasgow Warriors	18	13	0	5	479	338	+141	72	48	11	2	65	Qualification for the Champions Cup and knockout stage
2	Leinster **(CH)**	18	12	0	6	515	370	+145	77	51	13	2	63	Qualification for the Champions Cup and knockout stage
3	Stormers	18	12	1	5	504	344	+160	63	48	9	1	60	Qualification for the Champions Cup and knockout stage
4	Bulls **(RU)**	18	12	0	6	576	406	+170	82	59	10	1	59	Qualification for the Champions Cup and knockout stage
5	Munster	18	11	0	7	396	376	+20	59	51	8	3	55	Qualification for the Champions Cup and knockout stage
6	Cardiff	18	11	0	7	353	372	−19	52	52	7	4	55	Qualification for the Champions Cup and knockout stage
7	Lions	18	10	1	7	532	473	+59	73	70	9	3	54	Qualification for the Champions Cup and knockout stage
8	Connacht	18	10	0	8	442	395	+47	62	56	10	4	54	Qualification for the Champions Cup and knockout stage
9	Ulster	18	9	1	8	494	420	+74	72	60	10	4	52	Qualification for the Challenge Cup
10	Sharks	18	8	1	9	467	428	+39	71	57	9	3	46	Qualification for the Challenge Cup
11	Ospreys	18	7	2	9	376	454	−78	55	69	4	3	39	Qualification for the Challenge Cup
12	Edinburgh	18	7	0	11	362	439	−77	57	66	6	4	38	Qualification for the Challenge Cup
13	Benetton	18	6	2	10	327	493	−166	41	71	4	1	33	Qualification for the Challenge Cup
14	Scarlets	18	4	2	12	361	460	−99	52	63	3	5	28	Qualification for the Challenge Cup
15	Dragons	18	3	4	11	350	481	−131	46	71	4	4	28	Qualification for the Challenge Cup
16	Zebre	18	2	0	16	312	587	−275	43	85	3	4	15	Qualification for the Challenge Cup

Updated to match(es) played on 16 May 2026. Source: UnitedRugby.com
Rules for classification: Tiebreakers for teams tied on points: 1) Number of matches won 2) The difference between points for and points against 3) The number of tries scored 4) The most points scored 5) The difference between tries for and tries against 6) The fewest red cards received 7) The fewest yellow cards received.

==== Playoffs ====
The top eight teams in the regular season standings advance to the knockout stage, a single-elimination tournament culminating in a Grand Final to crown the overall champion.

Teams are seeded based on the regular season standings, with teams ranked 1–4 receiving home field advantage in the quarter-final, with 1 playing 8, 2 playing 7 etc. The top two teams in the standings are seeded so as not to meet until the Grand Final.

Home-field advantage for the semi-finals and Grand Final will be awarded to the highest-ranked team in each tie; the top two teams are therefore guaranteed home advantage until the final for as long as they remain in the tournament, and the top ranked team, Glasgow Warriors, in the standings will be awarded home advantage should they reach the Grand Final. In the build up to the final week of the regular season, it was reported that Glasgow Warriors may be forced to play a semi-final and final outside Scotland due to venue unavailability, although they would technically remain the home team. In the week of the quarter-final, it was announced they would, if they progressed, play their semi-final and Grand Final on home soil, at Murrayfield Stadium, Edinburgh.

Cardiff and Lions both made the play-offs for the first time. Stormers, Glasgow Warriors, Leinster, Munster and Bulls reached their fifth URC play-off phase from five seasons. Glasgow Warriors became the first non-Irish team to top the regular season table and take the number one seeding since they did so themselves in 2019.

Quarter-finals
1	(Scotland) **Glasgow Warriors**	33
8	(Ireland) Connacht	21
4	(South Africa) **Bulls**	45
5	(Ireland) Munster	14
3	(South Africa) **Stormers**	44
6	(Wales) Cardiff	21
2	(Ireland) **Leinster**	59
7	(South Africa) Lions	10

Semi-finals
1	(Scotland) Glasgow Warriors	21
4	(South Africa) **Bulls**	22
2	(Ireland) **Leinster**	20
3	(South Africa) Stormers	11

Final
2	**(Ireland) Leinster**	36
4	(South Africa) Bulls	7

Quarter-final

29 May 2026	**Glasgow Warriors (Scotland) (1)**	**33–21**	**(8) (Ireland) Connacht**	Scotstoun Stadium, Glasgow
19:45	Try: Schickerling 10' c Steyn (2) 44' c, 74' m McKay 55' c Oguntibeju 68' c Con: Horne (4) 10', 44', 55', 69'; Cards: Samuel (yellow card) 64'	Report	Try: Prendergast 4' c Heffernan 64' c Bealham 71' c Con: Gilbert (3) 5', 65', 71'; Cards: Sam Illo (yellow card) 13'	Attendance: 7,321; Referee: Adam Jones (Wales)

==== URC Irish Shield table ====
**2025–26 United Rugby Championship Regional Shield tables**
(Ireland) **Irish Shield**
	Team	P	W	D	L	PF	PA	PD	TF	TA	TBP	LBP	Pts	Pos overall
1	**(Ireland) Leinster**	6	5	0	1	166	120	+46	23	15	4	0	24	2
2	(Ireland) Munster	6	3	0	3	126	91	+35	16	15	2	1	15	5
3	(Ireland) Connacht	6	2	0	4	131	157	–27	18	21	2	2	12	8
4	(Ireland) Ulster	6	2	0	4	131	147	–16	18	22	1	2	11	9
If teams are level at any stage, tiebreakers are applied in the following order: 1. number of matches won 2. the difference between points for and points against 3. the number of tries scored 4. the most points scored 5. the difference between tries for and tries against 6. the fewest red cards received 7. the fewest yellow cards received
Green background indicates teams currently leading the regional shield. Upon the conclusion of the regular season, these teams win their respective regional shields. **(S)** : URC Shield champion

=== Challenge Cup ===
==== Pool matches ====
The fixtures for the EPCR Challenge Cup were released on 15 July 2025.

EPCR Challenge Cup Pool 1
Pos	Team	Pld	W	D	L	PF	PA	PD	TF	TA	TB	LB	Pts	Qualification
1	(France) Montpellier **(1)**	4	4	0	0	119	77	+42	18	10	4	0	20	Home round of 16
2	(Italy) Zebre Parma **(5)**	4	3	0	1	99	81	+18	12	11	2	0	14	Home round of 16
3	(Ireland) Connacht **(8)**	4	2	0	2	179	71	+108	26	11	3	2	13	Home round of 16
4	(Wales) Ospreys **(14)**	4	2	0	2	102	97	+5	16	12	3	2	13	Away round of 16
5	(Georgia (country)) Black Lion	4	1	0	3	58	132	−74	8	20	1	0	5	
6	(France) Montauban	4	0	0	4	81	180	−99	11	25	1	1	2	

Source: EPCR
Rules for classification: Tiebreakers for teams tied on points: 1) Number of matches won; 2) Difference between points for and against; 3) Total number of points for; 4) Aggregate number of points scored in matches between tied teams; 5) Number of matches won excluding the first match, then the second and so on until the tie is settled.

7 December 2025	**(1 BP) Ospreys (Wales)**	**24–21**	**(Ireland) Connacht (1 BP)**	Brewery Field, Bridgend
15:15	Try: Deaves 42' m Cokanasiga 57' c R. Smith 67' c Hopkins 75' m Con: Edwards (3/4) 57', 68'; Cards: Ratti (yellow card) 17'; Phillips (yellow card) 28'	Report	Try: Bealham 11' c Jansen 17' c Aungier 23' c Con: Naughton (3/3) 12', 18', 24'; Cards: Buckley (yellow card) 67'	Attendance: 3,311; Referee: Evan Urruzmendi (France)

13 December 2025	**(1 BP) Connacht (Ireland)**	**52–0**	**(Georgia (country)) Black Lion**	The Sportsground, Galway
20:00	Try: Boyle (3) 1' c, 9' c, 29' c Blade (2) 17' m, 54' c Illo 33' m Bolton (2) 40' c, 67' c Con: Gilbert (6/8) 2', 9', 29', 41', 54', 68'	Report	Cards: Aptsiauri (yellow card) 6'	Attendance: 3,928; Referee: Anthony Woodthorpe (England)

11 January 2026	**(1 BP) Montpellier (France)**	**33–31**	**(Ireland) Connacht (2 BP)**	Septeo Stadium, Montpellier
14:00	Try: Darmon 7' c Akrab 17' c Rates 65' c Bernadet 68' m Welsch 74' c Con: Coly (2/2) 8', 18'; Hogg (2/3) 66', 75'	Report	Try: Murphy 10' c Tierney-Martin 21' c Treacy 33' c Gilbert 46' c Con: Gilbert (4/4) 11', 22', 34', 47'; Pen: Gilbert (1/1) 41'	Attendance: 8,648; Referee: Morné Ferreira (South Africa)

17 January 2026	**(1 BP) Connacht (Ireland)**	**75–14**	**(France) Montauban**	The Sportsground, Galway
20:00	Try: Boyle (2) 7' c, 40' c Prendergast (2) 19' c, 34' c Gilbert 25' c Penalty try 29'; West 31' c Devine 35' c Jansen 44' m Jennings 65' c Tierney-Martin 80' c Con: Gilbert (7/7) 8', 19', 25', 32', 35', 36', 41'; Naughton (2/2) 66', 80+1'; Cards: Aungier (yellow card) 73'	Report	Try: Seux 21' c Vallée 73' c Con: Bosviel (1/1) 22'; Fortunel (1/1) 73'; Cards: Greyling (red card) 28'; Asaeli (yellow card) 29'; Pomponio (yellow card) 64'	Attendance: 3,928; Referee: Ben Connor (Wales)

==== Knockout stage ====
Connacht qualified for a home tie in the round of sixteen when they confirmed a third place finish in Pool 1 in Round 4 with a 75–14 victory over Montauban of France. Connacht were guaranteed at worst the eighth seeding following the match, securing a knockout tie at home. Further results elsewhere confirmed an eighth-place seeding, and a last 16 tie at home to fellow URC team, Sharks. The tie was the first European competition match played at The Sportsground following its full redevelopment.

A 29–12 victory against the South Africans earned Connacht an away quarter-final to Montpellier. A 45–22 defeat to the French side ended Connacht's participation in the Challenge Cup at the quarter-final stage.

Round of 16
1	(France) **Montpellier**	**53**
16	(France) Perpignan	13
8	(Ireland) **Connacht**	**29**
9	(South Africa) Sharks	12
5	**(Italy) Zebre Parma**	**31**
12	(France) Pau	15
4	(France) Stade Français	31
13	(Wales) **Dragons**	**36**
3	**(Ireland) Ulster**	**28**
14	(Wales) Ospreys	24
6	(England) Newcastle Red Bulls	18
11	**(France) La Rochelle**	**26**
2	**(Italy) Benetton**	**38**
15	(Wales) Cardiff	35
7	(England) **Exeter Chiefs**	**31**
10	(Ireland) Munster	21

Quarter-finals
1	(France) **Montpellier**	**45**
8	(Ireland) Connacht	22
5	(Italy) Zebre Parma	32
13	**(Wales) Dragons**	**35**
3	**(Ireland) Ulster**	**41**
11	(France) La Rochelle	24
2	(Italy) Benetton	41
7	**(England) Exeter Chiefs**	**44**

Semi-finals
1	**(France) Montpellier**	**18**
13	(Wales) Dragons	12
3	**(Ireland) Ulster**	**29**
7	(England) Exeter Chiefs	12

Final
1	(France) Montpellier	**59**
3	(Ireland) Ulster	26

Round of 16

3 April 2026	**Connacht (Ireland) (8)**	**29–12**	**(9) (South Africa) Sharks**	The Sportsground, Galway
20:00	Try: Mullins 22' c Forde (2) 46' c, 62' c Hurley-Langton 54' m Con: Gilbert (3/4) 23', 47', 63'; Pen: Gilbert (1/1) 69'	Report	Pen: Smith (4/5) 6', 20', 31', 33'	Attendance: 6,197; Referee: Sam Grove-White (Scotland)

Quarter-final

11 April 2026	**Montpellier (France) (1)**	**45–22**	**(8) (Ireland) Connacht**	Septeo Stadium, Montpellier
13:30	Try: Penalty try '3; Tolofua 14’ c Haouas 28’ m Miotti 36’ c Cadot 52’ c Price 69’ c Welsch 79’ m Con: Miotti (2/3) 15', 37'; Vincent (2/3) 53’, 70'; Cards: Akrab (yellow card) 55'	Report	Try: Tierney-Martin 18' m Naughton 45' c Aungier 76' c Con: Gilbert (2/3) 45', 76'; Pen: Gilbert (1/1) 3'; Cards: Tierney-Martin (yellow card) 5'; Hurley-Langton (yellow card) 6'; Bolton (yellow card) 27'	Attendance: 5,340; Referee: Christophe Ridley (England)

== Connacht Women ==
=== IRFU Women's Interprovincial Series ===
The 2025 IRFU Women's Interprovincial Series is being contested by women's teams representing the four provincial rugby unions of Ireland, under the same branding and uniforms as the senior men's teams in the United Rugby Championship. The competition currently uses a single round-robin format, similar to the one used in both the Six Nations Championship and the Women's Six Nations Championship. Each team plays the other three teams once. The following year the fixtures are reversed. As in previous seasons the competition also features playoffs and a final.

==== Matches ====
10 August 2025	(1 BP) Munster Women (Ireland)	44–5	(Ireland) Connacht Women	Musgrave Park, Cork
14:30	Try: Burke; Ugwueru (3); Corey; Nunan; Flannery; Heylmann; Con: Finn (2/8)	Report	Try: Ryder	Referee: Euan O'Riordan (Ireland)

16 August 2025	Connacht Women (Ireland)	12–7	(Ireland) Ulster Women (1 BP)	The Sportsground, Galway
16:30	Try: Oviawe; Maher; Con: Nic Dhonnacha (1/2)	Report	Try: Sheerin; Con: Sheerin

23 August 2025	(1 BP) Connacht Women (Ireland)	12–17	(Ireland) Leinster Women	The Sportsground, Galway
14:30	Try: Dixon; Oviawe; Con: Nic Dhonnacha (1/2)	Report	Try: Burke; Layde; Elmes Kinlan; Con: O'Sullivan Sexton (1/3)	Referee: John Lillis (Ireland)

==== Table ====
Pos	Team	Pld	W	D	L	PF	PA	PD	TF	TA	TB	LB	Pts	Qualification or relegation
1	Munster Women (CH)	3	3	0	0	115	44	+71	18	5	3	0	15	Qualified for Interprovincial final
2	Leinster Women (RU)	3	2	0	1	76	66	+10	14	10	2	0	10	Qualified for Interprovincial final
3	Connacht Women	3	1	0	2	27	66	−39	5	12	0	1	5	Qualified for third/fourth place final
4	Ulster Women	3	0	0	3	43	87	−44	7	15	0	1	1	Qualified for third/fourth place final

First match(es) will be played: Unknown. Source: Unknown
Rules for classification: 1) competition points; 2) match points difference; 3) match points for

==== Finals day ====
Third-place final

30 August 2025	Ulster Women (Ireland)	30–37	(Ireland) Connacht Women	Donnybrook Stadium
2:30pm	Try: O'Neill; Moyles; Barrett; Daley; Con: Moyles (2/4); Pen: Moyles (2)	Report	Try: Clarke (2); Nic Dhonnacha; Ryder; Browne Moran; Adams Verling; Con: Nic Dhonnacha (2/6); Pen: Nic Dhonnacha	Referee: Andrew Cole (Ireland)

=== Celtic Challenge ===
The 2025–26 Celtic Challenge was the fourth season of the Celtic Challenge, a cross-border women's rugby union competition with teams from Ireland, Wales and Scotland. The six-team tournament features a full double round robin fixture series, with each team playing the others both home and away. For the first time, the competition will include a finals series with semi-finals and a grand final.

Clovers, a combined team representing Munster and Connacht, return for a third season.

==== Table ====
Pos	Team	Pld	W	D	L	PF	PA	PD	TF	TA	TB	LB	Pts	Qualification
1	(Ireland) Wolfhounds (Q)	10	9	0	1	431	127	+304	66	20	9	0	45	Play-offs
2	(Ireland) Clovers (Q)	10	8	0	2	294	231	+63	48	37	7	0	39	Play-offs
3	(Wales) Gwalia Lightning (Q)	10	4	0	6	217	212	+5	34	35	5	4	25	Play-offs
4	(Wales) Brython Thunder (Q)	10	5	0	5	150	218	−68	24	35	2	1	23	Play-offs
5	(Scotland) Glasgow Warriors	10	2	0	8	154	236	−82	32	49	6	3	17	
6	(Scotland) Edinburgh Rugby	10	2	0	8	152	321	−169	19	37	3	1	12	

First match(es) will be played: 20 December 2025. Source: Celtic Challenge
Rules for classification: Four points for a win, two points for a draw. One bonus point for scoring four or more tries in a match; one bonus point for losing by a margin of seven or less.

==== Clovers fixtures ====
20 December 2025
11:30

(1 BP) Clovers (Ireland)	35–31	(Wales) Gwalia Lightning (2 BP)
Try: McGrath (2); Murphy; Adams Verling; McGrath; Con: Finn (5); Cards: Murphy (yellow card) 79'	Report	Try: Hill; Greenway; Davies (2); Vucaj; Con: Hughes (3)

Donnybrook Stadium, Dublin
Referee: Dermot Blake

3 January 2026
15:00

Clovers (Ireland)	7–24	(Ireland) Wolfhounds (1 BP)
Try: Adams Verling 40+2' c Con: Finn 40+3'	Report	Try: Dalton 6' c O'Connor 37' m Boylan 64' m Higgins 69' c Con: O'Brien (2) 7', 70'

Creggs RFC
Referee: Shane Tuohy

11 January 2026
12:00

(1 BP) Brython Thunder (Wales)	12–15	(Ireland) Clovers
Try: Williams; Crabb; Con: Marshall	Report	Try: Foley; Linn; Con: Finn; Pen: Finn

Cardiff Arms Park, Cardiff

18 January 2026
15:00

(1 BP) Clovers (Ireland)	57–31	(Scotland) Glasgow Warriors (1 BP)
Try: McInerney (2); Finn; McGann; McGrath; Murphy; Whelan; McGrath; Corey; Con: Finn (6)	Report	Try: McNamara; Flynn (2); Coubrough; Bogan; Con: Ainsworth (3); Cards: Flynn (yellow card) 9'

Ravenhill Stadium, Belfast

25 January 2026
12:00

(1 BP) Clovers (Ireland)	29-12	(Wales) Brython Thunder
Try: McCarthy; Cournane; Lane; Murphy; Corey; Con: Finn (2)	Report	Try: Rogers; Bowden; Con: Williams; Cards: Bluck (yellow card) 15'

Musgrave Park, Cork
Referee: Paudie Sheehan (Ireland)

31 January 2026
14:00

(2 BP) Glasgow Warriors (Scotland)	31–38	(Ireland) Clovers (1 BP)
Try: Coubrough; Bogan; Warren; Penalty try McNamara; Con: Warren; McNamara	Report	Try: Oviawe; McGrath (2); Whelan; McGann; Hession; Con: Finn (3); Hession; Cards: Ugwueru (yellow card) 68'; Oviawe (yellow card) 71'

Scotstoun Stadium, Glasgow
Referee: Ciaran Stark (Scotland)

14 February 2026
13:00

(1 BP) Gwalia Lightning (Wales)	14–19	(Ireland) Clovers
Try: Greenway; Hill; Con: Hughes (2)	Report	Try: Corey; McInerney; Murphy; Con: Hession (2)

CSE, Ystrad Mynach

21 February 2026
12:30

(1 BP) Clovers (Ireland)	31-7	(Scotland) Edinburgh Rugby
Try: Corey; Adams Verling; Ugwueru (2); Buttimer; Con: (3/5)	Report	Try: McMahon; Con: (1/1)

The Sportsground, Galway

28 February 2026
13:00

(1 BP) Edinburgh Rugby (Scotland)	26-43	(Ireland) Clovers (1 BP)
Try: Moody; Mathieson; Haddow; Ferrie; Con: (3/4)		Try: Parsons; Buttimer (2); Campbell; Cahill; McGann; McGrath; Con: (4/7)

Edinburgh Rugby Stadium, Edinburgh

7 March 2026
15:00

(1 BP) Wolfhounds (Ireland)	43-20	(Ireland) Clovers (1 BP)
Try: Moore; Daley (2); Marley; King (2); O'Connor; Con: O'Brien (4/7); Cards: Clenaghan (red card)	Report	Try: Parsons; McGann (2); Whelan

UCD Bowl, Dublin

==== Play-offs ====
For the first time, the Celtic Challenge will have play-offs to crown a champion, with the top four teams in the regular season advancing to semi-finals, followed by a grand final. With their 52–7 victory of third-placed Gwalia Lightning in round 9, Wolfhounds ensured that both Irish franchises would have a home nation semi-final; both matches were fixed for the Dexcom Stadium, Galway, while the final will take place in a preselected venue, Edinburgh's Hive Stadium.

On 21 March both Irish franchises defeated their Welsh semi-final opposition to set up an all-Ireland final for 28 March, guaranteeing a fourth consecutive Irish champion of the Challenge. On 28 March, Wolfhounds won their third title, defeating Clovers 50 - 29.

Semi-finals
21 March 2026 – Galway
(Ireland) Wolfhounds	36
(Wales) Brython Thunder	10
21 March 2026 – Galway
(Ireland) Clovers	35
(Wales) Gwalia Lightning	20

Final
28 March 2026 – Edinburgh Rugby Stadium, Edinburgh
(Ireland) Wolfhounds	50
(Ireland) Clovers	29

=== Semi-finals ===
21 March 2026
14:30

Wolfhounds (Ireland)	36–10	(Wales) Brython Thunder
Try: Naoise Smyth; Stacey Flood (2); Niamh Higgins; Vicky Elmes Kinlan; Robyn O'Connor; Con: Dannah O'Brien (3)	Report	Try: Branwen Metcalfe; Jorja Aiono

Dexcom Stadium, Galway
Referee: John Lillis (IRFU)

21 March 2026
12:00

Clovers (Ireland)	35–20	(Wales) Gwalia Lightning
Try: Beth Buttimer; Béibhinn Parsons; Alana McInerney (2); Ruth Campbell; Con: Enya Breen (5)	Report, 2	Try: Alaw Pyrs (2); Caitlin Lewis; Con: Carys Hughes; Pen: Hughes

Dexcom Stadium, Galway
Referee: Paul O’Connor (IRFU)

=== Final ===
28 March 2026
15:00

Wolfhounds (Ireland)	50 - 29	(Ireland) Clovers
Try: Vicky Elmes Kinlan (2); Linda Djougang (2); Erin King (2); Maeve Óg O’Leary; Caoimhe Molloy; Con: Dannah O’Brien (4); Abby Moyles	Report	Try: Niamh Murphy; Eilís Cahill (2); Béibhinn Parsons (2); Con: Enya Breen (2); Cards: Ailish Quinn (yellow card)

Edinburgh Rugby Stadium, Edinburgh
Referee: Jonny Mackenzie (SRU)
