= 2026–27 Connacht Rugby season =

Connacht
- 2026–27 season
- Head coach: Stuart Lancaster
- CEO: Willie Ruane

The 2026–27 season is Connacht's sixth season in the United Rugby Championship, and 26th in all formats of the competition. Along with competing in the URC and its Irish Shield competition, the club will also participate in the 2026–27 European Rugby Champions Cup.

== Staff and management ==
=== Players in ===
- (Ireland) Ciarán Frawley from (Ireland) Leinster
- (Ireland) Will Connors from (Ireland) Leinster
- (South Africa) Francois van Wyk from (England) Bath
- (Ireland) Fiachna Barrett (promoted from Academy)
- (Ireland) Sean Naughton (promoted from Academy)
- (Ireland) Matthew Victory (promoted from Academy)
- (Ireland) Jerry Cahir from (Ireland) Leinster
- (Ireland) Thomas Connolly from (Ireland) Belvedere
- (Ireland) Billy Bohan (promoted from Academy)

=== Players out ===
- (Ireland) Joe Joyce to (England) Gloucester
- (Ireland) Matthew Devine to (Ireland) Ulster
- (Ireland) Jack Carty (retired)
- (Ireland) Denis Buckley (retired)
- (Ireland) Oisin Dowling (retired)
- (Ireland) Temi Lasisi (released)
- (Ireland) Oisín McCormack (released)
- (Ireland) David Hawkshaw (released)
- (Ireland) Jack Aungier to (Ireland) Munster
- (Ireland) Chay Mullins to (Ireland) Ulster
- (Ireland) Peter Dooley to (Ireland) Leinster

== United Rugby Championship ==
=== Matches ===
Connacht will begin their sixth URC campaign at home to South African side Stormers.

25 September	Connacht (Ireland)	15–29	(South Africa) Stormers (1 BP)	The Sportsground, Galway
	Try: Hansen 38' c Ioane 42' m Con: Gilbert (1/2) 39'; Pen: Gilbert 52'; Cards: Boyle (yellow card) 54'	Report; Scorecard; Highlights	Try: Gelant 20' c Sandi 57' c Paulo 78' m Ngobeni 80' c Con: Matthee (2/2) 21', 58'; Ahmed (1/2) 81'; Pen: Matthee 9'	Attendance: 7,243; Referee: Sam Grove-White (Scotland)

2 October	Benetton (Italy)	19–22	(Ireland) Connacht (1 BP)	Stadio Monigo, Treviso
	Try: Bernasconi (2) 11' m, 51' c Marin 34' c Con: Umaga (2/3) 35', 52'	Report; Scorecard; Highlights	Try: Prendergast 5' m O'Brien 16' m Frawley (2) 37' c, 77' m Con: Gilbert (1/4) 38'; Cards: Bealham (yellow card) 39'	Attendance: 4,946; Referee: Hollie Davidson (Scotland)

9 October	(1 BP) Glasgow Warriors (Scotland)	36–19	(Ireland) Connacht	Scotstoun Stadium
	Try: Hiddleston (2) 20' m, 43' c Darge 33' c McKay 43' c Stephen 65' c Con: Horne (4/5) 34', 44', 44', 66'; Pen: Lancaster 83'; Cards: Cummings (yellow card) 74'	Report; Scorecard; Highlights	Try: Jansen 15' c Ioane (2) 47' c, 59' m Con: Frawley (2/3) 16', 48'; Cards: Illo (yellow card) 42'; Murphy (yellow card) 62'	Attendance: 6,970; Referee: Ben Breakspear (Wales)

23 October	(1 BP) Connacht (Ireland)	48–27	(Italy) Zebre (1 BP)	The Sportsground, Galway
	Try: Bealham 9' c Jansen 14' m Forde 18' c Gilbert 23' c Prendergast 31' c Heffernan (2) 55' m, 80' m West 68' m Con: Frawley (4/6) 9', 19', 24', 31'	Report; Scorecard; Highlights	Try: Giacomo Ferrari 5' m Jacopo Botturi 28' c Mirko Belloni 33' m Giampietro Ribaldi 71' m Bautista Stavile 77' m Con: Giovanni Montemauri (1/3) 29'	Attendance: 5,897; Referee: Hanru van Rooyen (South Africa)

30 October	Connacht (Ireland)	5–50	(Ireland) Leinster (1 BP)	The Sportsground, Galway
	Try: Heffernan, 28' m	Report; Scorecard; Highlights	Try: McCarthy 16' c Larmour 25' c Lawlor 32' c Deegan 52' m Carbery 61' c Mangan 73' c Gunne 78' c Con: Carbery (6/7) 17', 26', 33', 61', 74', 78'; Pen: Carbery 51'	Attendance: 12,500; Referee: Hollie Davidson (Scotland)

5 December 2026	Scarlets (Wales)	v	(Ireland) Connacht	Parc y Scarlets, Llanelli

19 December 2026	Connacht (Ireland)	v	(Scotland) Edinburgh	The Sportsground, Galway

27 December 2026	Ulster (Ireland)	v	(Ireland) Connacht	Ravenhill Stadium, Belfast

2 January 2027	Connacht (Ireland)	v	(Ireland) Munster	The Sportsground, Galway

23 January 2027	Munster (Ireland)	v	(Ireland) Connacht	Thomond Park, Limerick

30 January 2027	Connacht (Ireland)	v	(Ireland) Ulster	The Sportsground, Galway

27 February 2027	Ospreys (Wales)	v	(Ireland) Connacht	St Helen's, Swansea

19 March 2027	Connacht (Ireland)	v	(Wales) Cardiff	The Sportsground, Galway

27 March 2027	Connacht (Ireland)	v	(South Africa) Lions	The Sportsground, Galway

17 April 2027	Leinster (Ireland)	v	(Ireland) Connacht	RDS Arena, Dublin

24 April 2027	Connacht (Ireland)	v	(Wales) Dragons	The Sportsground, Galway

8 May 2027	Sharks (South Africa)	v	(Ireland) Connacht	Kings Park Stadium, Durban

15 May 2027	Bulls (South Africa)	v	(Ireland) Connacht	Loftus Versfeld Stadium, Pretoria

=== Standings ===
Pos	Team	Pld	W	D	L	PF	PA	PD	TF	TA	TB	LB	Pts	Qualification
1	Glasgow Warriors	5	4	1	0	148	112	+36	22	15	5	0	23	Qualification for the Champions Cup and knockout stage
2	Edinburgh	4	4	0	0	111	64	+47	15	8	3	0	19	Qualification for the Champions Cup and knockout stage
3	Leinster	5	3	0	2	149	81	+68	23	11	4	2	18	Qualification for the Champions Cup and knockout stage
4	Bulls	4	3	0	1	160	90	+70	23	11	3	1	16	Qualification for the Champions Cup and knockout stage
5	Stormers	4	3	0	1	133	94	+39	19	13	3	1	16	Qualification for the Champions Cup and knockout stage
6	Sharks	4	3	0	1	125	104	+21	18	16	3	0	15	Qualification for the Champions Cup and knockout stage
7	Ospreys	4	2	0	2	112	121	−9	18	17	3	0	11	Qualification for the Champions Cup and knockout stage
8	Connacht	5	2	0	3	109	161	−52	18	24	2	0	10	Qualification for the Champions Cup and knockout stage
9	Munster	4	1	1	2	90	98	−8	12	15	2	2	10	Qualification for the Challenge Cup
10	Cardiff	4	2	0	2	87	107	−20	13	17	1	0	9	Qualification for the Challenge Cup
11	Lions	5	2	0	3	107	162	−55	15	25	1	0	9	Qualification for the Challenge Cup
12	Ulster	4	0	2	2	114	127	−13	17	17	4	1	9	Qualification for the Challenge Cup
13	Dragons	4	1	1	2	102	114	−12	15	18	2	1	9	Qualification for the Challenge Cup
14	Scarlets	4	1	0	3	108	137	−29	16	21	3	1	8	Qualification for the Challenge Cup
15	Benetton	4	0	1	3	84	92	−8	12	15	1	3	6	Qualification for the Challenge Cup
16	Zebre	4	0	0	4	79	164	−85	12	25	2	0	2	Qualification for the Challenge Cup

Updated to match(es) played on 23 October 2026. Source: UnitedRugby.com
Rules for classification: Tiebreakers for teams tied on points: 1) Number of matches won 2) The difference between points for and points against 3) The number of tries scored 4) The most points scored 5) The difference between tries for and tries against 6) The fewest red cards received 7) The fewest yellow cards received.

=== URC Irish Shield ===
2026–27 United Rugby Championship Regional Shield tables
(Ireland) Irish Shield
	Team	P	W	D	L	PF	PA	PD	TF	TA	TBP	LBP	Pts	Pos overall
1	(Ireland) Leinster	2	2	0	0	74	23	+51	11	3	2	0	10	3
2	(Ireland) Munster	2	0	1	1	44	50	–6	6	8	1	1	4	9
3	(Ireland) Ulster	1	0	1	0	26	26	0	4	4	1	0	3	12
4	(Ireland) Connacht	1	0	0	1	5	50	-45	1	7	0	0	0	8
If teams are level at any stage, tiebreakers are applied in the following order: 1. number of matches won 2. the difference between points for and points against 3. the number of tries scored 4. the most points scored 5. the difference between tries for and tries against 6. the fewest red cards received 7. the fewest yellow cards received
Green background indicates teams currently leading the regional shield. Upon the conclusion of the regular season, these teams win their respective regional shields. (S) : URC Shield champion

== European Rugby Champions Cup ==
Having finished eighth in the 2025–26 United Rugby Championship, Connacht qualified for the 2025–26 European Rugby Champions Cup. The pool stage draw will take place on 1 July 2026.
