= List of 2024–25 United Rugby Championship transfers =

This is a list of player transfers involving United Rugby Championship teams before or during 2024–25 season.

== Benetton ==
=== Players in ===
- (Italy) Louis Lynagh from (England) Harlequins
- (Italy) Matt Gallagher from (England) Bath
- (Italy) Riccardo Genovese from (Italy) Zebre Parma
- (Italy) Marco Manfredi from (Italy) Zebre Parma
- (Argentina) Lautaro Bazán from (Italy) Rovigo Delta
- (Fiji) Simon Koroiyadi from (England) Leicester Tigers
- (Argentina) Agustín Creevy from (England) Sale Sharks

=== Players out ===
- (Italy) Giacomo Da Re to (Italy) Zebre Parma
- (South Africa) Dewaldt Duvenage to (South Africa) Western Province
- (Scotland) Sam Hidalgo-Clyne retired
- (Samoa) Henry Stowers released
- (England) Marcus Watson retired
- (Italy) Giovanni Pettinelli to (Italy) Mogliano Veneto
- (Italy) Marco Lazzaroni to (Italy) Mogliano Veneto
- (Italy) Federico Zani retired
- (Italy) Giacomo Nicotera to (France) Stade Français Paris
- (Italy) Edoardo Padovani to (Italy) Mogliano Veneto
- (Italy) Gianmarco Lucchesi to (France) Toulon
- (Argentina) Joaquin Riera to (France) Rouen

== Bulls ==
=== Players in ===
- (South Africa) Cobus Wiese from (England) Sale Sharks
- (South Africa) Boeta Chamberlain from (South Africa) Sharks
- (South Africa) Aphiwe Dyantyi from (South Africa) Sharks
- (South Africa) Nama Xaba from (South Africa) Stormers
- (South Africa) Alulutho Tshakweni from (South Africa) Cheetahs
- (South Africa) Sintu Manjezi from (Scotland) Glasgow Warriors

=== Players out ===
- (South Africa) Chris Smith to (France) Oyonnax
- (South Africa) WJ Steenkamp to (South Africa) Lions
- (South Africa) Kurt-Lee Arendse to (Japan) Mitsubishi Sagamihara DynaBoars
- (South Africa) Lionel Mapoe retired
- (South Africa) Muller Uys to (Japan) Kamaishi Seawaves
- (South Africa) Khutha Mchunu to (Japan) Mitsubishi Sagamihara DynaBoars

== Cardiff ==
=== Players in ===
- (Wales) Callum Sheedy from (England) Bristol Bears
- (England) Gabriel Hamer-Webb from (England) Northampton Saints
- (Wales) Steffan Emanuel from (England) Bath
- (Wales) Tom Bowen from (England) Bristol Bears
- (Wales) Joe Cowell from (Wales) Cardiff Metropolitan University
- (England) Danny Southworth from (England) Exeter Chiefs
- (Ireland) Ed Byrne from (Ireland) Leinster
- (England) Iwan Stephens from (England) Newcastle Falcons
- (England) Rory Jennings from (England) Newcastle Falcons
- (Wales) Dan Thomas from (England) Bristol Bears
- (England) Josh McNally from (England) Bath
- (Wales) Aled Davies from (England) Saracens
- (South Africa) Johan Mulder from (South Africa) Lions
- (Wales) Regan Grace from (England) Bath
- (Italy) Callum Braley from (England) Saracens (short-term deal)

=== Players out ===
- (Wales) Tomos Williams to (England) Gloucester
- (Wales) Rhys Carré to (England) Saracens
- (Wales) Ellis Jenkins retired
- (Wales) Owen Lane to (France) Valence Romans
- (Wales) Shane Lewis-Hughes to (Wales) Dragons
- (England) Ciaran Parker retired
- (Wales) Arwel Robson to (France) Chambéry
- (Wales) Matthew Aubrey released
- (Wales) Aled Summerhill released
- (Tonga) Lopeti Timani to (France) Narbonne
- (Wales) Willis Halaholo to (New Zealand) Bay of Plenty

== Connacht ==
=== Players in ===
- (Ireland) Matthew Devine promoted from Academy
- (Ireland) Hugh Gavin promoted from Academy
- (England) Piers O'Conor from (England) Bristol Bears
- (Ireland) Adam McBurney from (Scotland) Edinburgh
- (Ireland) David O'Connor from (England) Ealing Trailfinders
- (Ireland) Temi Lasisi from (Ireland) Leinster
- (Ireland) Ben Murphy from (Ireland) Leinster
- (Ireland) Josh Murphy returning from sabbatical
- (Ireland) Chay Mullins promoted from Academy
- (New Zealand) Josh Ioane from (New Zealand) Chiefs

=== Players out ===
- (Ireland) Diarmuid Kilgallen to (Ireland) Munster
- (Ireland) Tiernan O'Halloran retired
- (Australia) Jarrad Butler released
- (Ireland) Matthew Burke released
- (Ireland) Tadgh McElroy to (Ireland) Ulster
- (Ireland) Michael McDonald to (Ireland) Ulster (returning from season-long loan)
- (Ireland) Tom Farrell to (Ireland) Munster
- (New Zealand) Dominic Robertson-McCoy to (France) Aurillac
- (Ireland) Tom Daly to (France) Stade Niçois
- (Ireland) Oisin Michel to (England) Cornish Pirates
- (Ireland) Oran McNulty to (England) Ampthill
- (Ireland) Gavin Thornbury to (England) Northampton Saints
- (Australia) John Porch to (France) Vannes
- (Ireland) Adam McBurney to (Romania) CS Dinano București
- (Ireland) Andrew Smith to (Ireland) Munster (on loan)

== Dragons ==
=== Players in ===
- (Tonga) Solomone Funaki from (New Zealand) Moana Pasifika
- (Australia) Harry Wilson from (Australia) NSW Waratahs
- (Australia) Steve Cummins from (France) Pau
- (Wales) Shane Lewis-Hughes from (Wales) Cardiff
- (Wales) Oli Burrows from (England) Exeter Chiefs
- (Wales) Owen Conquer from (Wales) Ebbw Vale
- (Wales) Harri Ford from (Wales) RGC 1404
- (Wales) Owain James from (Wales) Cardiff
- (Wales) Oli Woodman promoted from the Academy
- (England) Lloyd Evans from (England) Gloucester

=== Players out ===
- (Wales) Corey Baldwin released
- (Wales) Jack Dixon retired
- (Wales) Lewis Jones released
- (England) Sean Lonsdale to (England) Ealing Trailfinders
- (Wales) Nathan Evans to (Wales) Newport
- (Wales) Bradley Roberts retired
- (England) Lloyd Fairbrother retired
- (New Zealand) Sio Tomkinson to (Australia) Western Force
- (England) Max Clark to (England) Saracens
- (Wales) Steffan Hughes to (United States) Old Glory DC
- (Samoa) Aki Seiuli to (United States) Utah Warriors
- (Argentina) Gonzalo Bertranou to (United States) Rugby FC Los Angeles
- (Wales) Ollie Griffiths retired
- (Wales) Leon Brown retired

== Edinburgh ==
=== Players in ===
- (England) Paul Hill from (England) Northampton Saints
- (Scotland) Magnus Bradbury from (England) Bristol Bears
- (Australia) Mosese Tuipulotu from (Australia) NSW Waratahs
- (Scotland) Ross McCann from (United Kingdom) Great Britain Sevens
- (Scotland) Ross Thompson from (Scotland) Glasgow Warriors
- (Scotland) Matt Scott from (England) Leicester Tigers

=== Players out ===
- (Fiji) Viliame Mata to (England) Bristol Bears
- (Scotland) WP Nel retired
- (South Africa) Luan de Bruin to (England) Newcastle Falcons
- (Ireland) Adam McBurney to (Ireland) Connacht
- (Australia) Charlie Savala to (England) Northampton Saints
- (Scotland) Jamie Campbell released
- (Scotland) Scott Steele retired
- (Scotland) Jacob Henry to (England) Coventry (season-long loan)

== Glasgow Warriors ==
=== Players in ===
- (Namibia) Patrick Schickerling from (England) Exeter Chiefs
- (Scotland) Rory Sutherland from (France) Oyonnax
- (Scotland) Adam Hastings from (England) Gloucester
- (Scotland) Grant Stewart from (Scotland) Ayrshire Bulls
- (Scotland) Fin Richardson from (England) Exeter Chiefs
- (Australia) Sam Talakai from (Australia) Melbourne Rebels

=== Players out ===
- (United States) Greg Peterson to (United States) San Diego Legion
- (Scotland) Fraser Brown retired
- (Scotland) Ross Thompson to (Scotland) Edinburgh
- (Argentina) Enrique Pieretto to (Australia) NSW Waratahs
- (Scotland) George Turner to (Japan) Kobelco Kobe Steelers
- (Scotland) Oli Kebble to (France) Oyonnax
- (Scotland) Thomas Gordon to (England) Newcastle Falcons
- (South Africa) Sintu Manjezi to (South Africa) Bulls
- (Argentina) Lucio Sordoni to (France) Racing 92
- (Scotland) Richie Gray to (Japan) Toyota Verblitz

== Leinster ==
=== Players in ===
- (South Africa) RG Snyman from (Ireland) Munster
- (New Zealand) Jordie Barrett from (New Zealand) Hurricanes (short-term deal)
- (Ireland) Jack Boyle promoted from Academy
- (Ireland) James Culhane promoted from Academy
- (Ireland) Paddy McCarthy promoted from Academy
- (France) Rabah Slimani from (France) Clermont

=== Players out ===
- (Samoa) Michael Alaalatoa to (France) Clermont
- (South Africa) Jason Jenkins to (South Africa) Sharks
- (Ireland) Ross Molony to (England) Bath
- (Ireland) Ed Byrne to (Wales) Cardiff
- (Ireland) Temi Lasisi to (Ireland) Connacht
- (Ireland) Ben Murphy to (Ireland) Connacht
- (Ireland) Rhys Ruddock retired
- (New Zealand) Charlie Ngatai released
- (Ireland) Martin Moloney to (England) Exeter Chiefs
- (Ireland) Harry Byrne to (England) Bristol Bears (short-term loan)
- (Ireland) Lee Barron to (Ireland) Munster (on loan)
- (Ireland) Michael Milne to (Ireland) Munster (on loan)

== Lions ==
=== Players in ===
- (Zimbabwe) Tapiwa Mafura from (South Africa) Cheetahs
- (South Africa) Franco Marais from (Japan) Urayasu D-Rocks
- (South Africa) Siba Qoma from (South Africa) Cheetahs
- (South Africa) Juan Schoeman from (England) Bath
- (South Africa) WJ Steenkamp from (South Africa) Bulls

=== Players out ===
- (South Africa) Jordan Hendrikse to (South Africa) Sharks
- (South Africa) Hanru Sirgel to (France) Grenoble
- (Democratic Republic of the Congo) Emmanuel Tshituka to (South Africa) Sharks
- (South Africa) Willem Alberts retired
- (South Africa) Tyler Bocks to (England) Ealing Trailfinders
- (South Africa) Johan Mulder to (Wales) Cardiff
- (South Africa) Ruan Dreyer to (South Africa) Sharks
- (South Africa) Sanele Nohamba to (Japan) Shizuoka Blue Revs

== Munster ==
=== Players in ===
- (Ireland) Diarmuid Kilgallen from (Ireland) Connacht
- (Ireland) Billy Burns from (Ireland) Ulster
- (Ireland) Tom Farrell from (Ireland) Connacht
- (South Africa) Thaakir Abrahams from (France) Lyon
- (Ireland) Edwin Edogbo promoted from Academy
- (Ireland) Tony Butler promoted from Academy
- (Ireland) Ethan Coughlan promoted from Academy
- (Ireland) Mark Donnelly promoted from Academy
- (Ireland) Brian Gleeson promoted from Academy
- (Ireland) Bryan Fitzgerald from (Ireland) Garryowen (short-term deal)
- (Ireland) Conor Bartley from (Ireland) Young Munster (short-term deal)
- (South Africa) Dian Bleuler from (South Africa) Sharks (short-term deal)
- (Ireland) Andrew Smith from (Ireland) Connacht (on loan)
- (Ireland) Lee Barron from (Ireland) Leinster (on loan)
- (Ireland) Michael Milne from (Ireland) Leinster (on loan)

=== Players out ===
- (Ireland) Joey Carbery to (France) Bordeaux
- (South Africa) RG Snyman to (Ireland) Leinster
- (Ireland) Simon Zebo retired
- (France) Antoine Frisch to (France) Toulon
- (Ireland) Daniel Okeke to (England) Coventry
- (Ireland) Jack O'Sullivan to (Japan) NTT DoCoMo Red Hurricanes Osaka
- (Ireland) Neil Cronin released
- (Ireland) Eoghan Clarke to (England) Saracens

== Ospreys ==
=== Players in ===
- (England) William Greatbanks from (France) Soyaux Angoulême
- (England) Phil Cokanasiga from (England) Leicester Tigers
- (Wales) Steffan Thomas from (Wales) Scarlets
- (Wales) Kieran Hardy from (Wales) Scarlets
- (South Africa) Daniel Kasende from (South Africa) Cheetahs
- (Wales) Ryan Conbeer from (Wales) Scarlets (short-term deal)
- (Wales) Rhys Thomas from (Wales) Aberavon
- (Fiji) Waisea Nayacalevu from (England) Sale Sharks
- (England) George McGuigan from (England) Gloucester

=== Players out ===
- (Wales) George North to (France) Provence
- (Ireland) Jack Regan to (Japan) Toyota Industries Shuttles Aichi
- (Wales) Nicky Smith to (England) Leicester Tigers
- (Wales) Alex Cuthbert released
- (Ireland) Will Hickey released
- (Wales) Toby Fricker to (United States) New England Free Jacks
- (Scotland) Cameron Jones to (England) Cornish Pirates
- (Wales) Mat Protheroe to (New Zealand) Hawke's Bay

== Scarlets ==
=== Players in ===
- (South Africa) Marnus van der Merwe from (South Africa) Cheetahs
- (Scotland) Alec Hepburn from (England) Exeter Chiefs
- (England) Ellis Mee from (England) Nottingham
- (Australia) Max Douglas from (Japan) Yokohama Canon Eagles
- (Wales) Henry Thomas from (France) Castres
- (New Zealand) Blair Murray from (New Zealand) Canterbury
- (Australia) Archer Holz from (Australia) NSW Waratahs
- (England) Gabe Hawley from (England) Ealing Trailfinders

=== Players out ===
- (Wales) Steffan Thomas to (Wales) Ospreys
- (Wales) Kieran Hardy to (Wales) Ospreys
- (Wales) Iestyn Gwilliam released
- (Wales) Lewis Morgan released
- (Wales) Iwan Shenton released
- (Wales) Callum Williams released
- (Wales) Joe Jones to (England) Doncaster Knights
- (Wales) Luca Giannini to (Wales) Swansea
- (South Africa) Eduan Swart to (South Africa) Pumas
- (Wales) Dan Jones to (England) Ealing Trailfinders
- (Scotland) Teddy Leatherbarrow to (England) Sedgley Tigers
- (Wales) Wyn Jones to (England) Harlequins
- (Wales) Ryan Conbeer to (Wales) Ospreys
- (Wales) Jonathan Davies retired
- (Wales) Scott Williams to (Wales) Pontypool
- (Wales) Carwyn Tuipulotu to (France) Pau

== Sharks ==
=== Players in ===
- (South Africa) Jordan Hendrikse from (South Africa) Lions
- (South Africa) André Esterhuizen from (England) Harlequins
- (Democratic Republic of the Congo) Emmanuel Tshituka from (South Africa) Lions
- (South Africa) Jason Jenkins from (Ireland) Leinster
- (South Africa) Trevor Nyakane from (France) Racing 92
- (South Africa) Ruan Dreyer from (South Africa) Lions
- (South Africa) Siya Kolisi from (France) Racing 92

=== Players out ===
- (South Africa) Le Roux Roets to (England) Sale Sharks
- (South Africa) Werner Kok to (Ireland) Ulster
- (South Africa) Boeta Chamberlain to (South Africa) Bulls
- (South Africa) Curwin Bosch to (France) Brive
- (South Africa) Lionel Cronjé retired
- (South Africa) Zee Mkhabela released
- (South Africa) Aphiwe Dyantyi to (South Africa) Bulls
- (South Africa) Sikhumbuzo Notshe to (France) Montauban
- (South Africa) Coenie Oosthuizen retired
- (South Africa) Anthony Volmink to (France) Cognac
- (South Africa) Murray Koster to (Japan) Hino Red Dolphins
- (South Africa) Nevaldo Fleurs to (South Africa) Pumas
- (South Africa) Dan Jooste to (France) Pau
- (South Africa) Kerron van Vuuren to (United States) Seattle Seawolves
- (South Africa) Dian Bleuler to (Ireland) Munster (short-term loan)
- (South Africa) Cameron Wright to (France) Oyonnax

== Stormers ==
=== Players in ===
- (South Africa) Steven Kitshoff from (Ireland) Ulster
- (South Africa) JD Schickerling from (Japan) Kobelco Kobe Steelers
- (Zimbabwe) Dave Ewers from (Ireland) Ulster

=== Players out ===
- (South Africa) Nama Xaba to (South Africa) Bulls
- (South Africa) Mnombo Zwelendaba to (South Africa) Griquas
- Tristan Leyds to South Africa Sevens
- (South Africa) Junior Pokomela released
- (South Africa) Chad Solomon released
- (South Africa) Hacjivah Dayimani to (France) Racing 92
- (South Africa) Simon Miller to (Japan) Shizuoka Blue Revs
- (South Africa) Kwenzo Blose to (England) Exeter Chiefs
- (South Africa) Lee-Marvin Mazibuko to (France) Racing 92
- (South Africa) Hendré Stassen to (France) Brive
- (South Africa) Leon Lyons to (South Africa) Griquas
- (South Africa) Steven Kitshoff retired

== Ulster ==
=== Players in ===
- (South Africa) Werner Kok from (South Africa) Sharks
- (Ireland) Lorcan McLoughlin promoted from Academy
- (Ireland) James McNabney promoted from Academy
- (Ireland) Scott Wilson promoted from Academy
- (Ireland) Michael McDonald from (Ireland) Connacht (returning from season-long loan)
- (New Zealand) Aidan Morgan from (New Zealand) Hurricanes
- (Ireland) James Humphreys promoted from Academy
- Zac Ward from Ireland Sevens '
- (Ireland) Corrie Barrett from (England) Doncaster Knights
- (Ireland) Tadgh McElroy from (Ireland) Connacht (short-term deal)
- (Ireland) Bryan O'Connor from (England) Bedford Blues
- (Ireland) Rob Lyttle from (Ireland) Banbridge (short-term injury cover)
- (Ireland) Matthew Dalton from (France) Soyaux Angoulême
- (England) Sam Crean from (England) Saracens (short-term deal)

=== Players out ===
- (Ireland) Billy Burns to (Ireland) Munster
- (Ireland) Angus Curtis retired
- (South Africa) Steven Kitshoff to (South Africa) Stormers
- (Ireland) Luke Marshall retired
- (Ireland) Shea O'Brien released
- (Ireland) Greg Jones released
- (Ireland) Will Addison to (England) Sale Sharks
- (Ireland) James French to (England) Cornish Pirates
- (Zimbabwe) Dave Ewers to (South Africa) Stormers
- (Ireland) Marty Moore retired
- (Ireland) Tadgh McElroy to (England) Sale Sharks
- (Ireland) Aaron Sexton released
- (Ireland) Michael McDonald to (Australia) Waratahs (short term injury cover)

== Zebre Parma ==
=== Players in ===
- (Italy) Giacomo Da Re from (Italy) Benetton
- (Italy) Giovanni Quattrini promoted from Academy
- (Italy) Luca Franceschetto from (Italy) Colorno
- (Fiji) Rusiate Nasove from (Italy) Valorugby Emilia

=== Players out ===
- (Italy) Riccardo Genovese to (Italy) Benetton
- (New Zealand) Taina Fox-Matamua released
- (New Zealand) Josh Kaifa to (New Zealand) Hawke's Bay
- (South Africa) Franco Smith to (South Africa) Cheetahs
- (South Africa) Liam Zocchi-Dommann released
- (Italy) Marco Manfredi to (Italy) Benetton
- (Italy) Alessio Sanavia to (Italy) Rovigo Delta
- (Italy) Pierre Bruno to (Italy) Valorugby Emilia
- (Italy) David Sisi retired
- (England) Tiff Eden to (England) Saracens
- (Wales) Ben Cambriani released
- (South Africa) Dylan de Leeuw released

== See also ==
- List of 2024–25 Premiership Rugby transfers
- List of 2024–25 RFU Championship transfers
- List of 2024–25 Super Rugby transfers
- List of 2024–25 Top 14 transfers
- List of 2024–25 Rugby Pro D2 transfers
- List of 2024–25 Major League Rugby transfers
