= Seán O'Brien (rugby union, born 2000) =

Irish rugby union player

- Born: Sean Finn O'Brien; 31 July 2000 (age 26) Pittsburgh, Pennsylvania, United States
- Height: 1.93 m (6 ft 4 in)
- Weight: 106 kg (234 lb; 16 st 10 lb)
- School: Blackrock College
- University: UCD

Rugby union career
- Position: Flanker
- Current team: Connacht Rugby
Senior career
| Years | Team | Apps | (Points) |
| 2023- | Connacht | 26 | (15) |
| 2020-2023 | Leinster | 3 | (0) |
| 2020 | LA Giltinis - on loan | 6 | |
- Correct as of 28 February 2026
International career
| Years | Team | Apps | (Points) |
| 2020 | Ireland U20s | 3 | (0) |
- Correct as of 29 Jan 2023

Seán O'Brien (born 31 July 2000) is an American born Irish rugby union player, currently playing for Pro14 and European Rugby Champions Cup side Connacht. His preferred position is flanker. and Number 8.

Although born in Pittsburgh, Sean returned to Dublin before the age of 1, and played his junior rugby at Greystones Rugby Club in Wicklow before winning a JCT and SCT medal with Blackrock College.

Sean was part of the Leinster academy from 2020 to 2023 when he was then offered a professional contract with Connacht Rugby.

== Leinster ==
O'Brien was named in the Leinster Rugby academy for the 2020–21 season. He made his debut in Round 15 of the 2020–21 Pro14 against Zebre.

== Connacht ==
O'Brien was named in the Connacht Squad for the 2023–24 season. He made his debut, and received his first cap vs Ospreys. O'Brien then travelled with the squad to South Africa, playing in both away games, vs the Sharks and Bulls, scoring his first URC try in Durban.
