= Finn Treacy =

Irish rugby union player

- Born: 14 August 2004 (age 22) Wicklow, Ireland
- Height: 1.80 m (5 ft 11 in)
- Weight: 81 kg (12.8 st; 179 lb)
- School: Presentation College, Bray

Rugby union career
- Position: Wing
Senior career
Years	Team	Apps	(Points)
2024–	Connacht	16	(35)
- Correct as of 31 January 2026
International career
Years	Team	Apps	(Points)
2024	Ireland U20	9	(20)
- Correct as of 8 November 2025

Finn Treacy (born 14 August 2004) is an Irish rugby union player, currently playing for United Rugby Championship side Connacht. He plays as a wing.

== Connacht ==
Treacy was named as a member of the Connacht academy for the 2023–24 season. He made his debut for Connacht in Round 10 of the 2024–25 United Rugby Championship against Glasgow Warriors. He scored his first try against Benetton in the Sportsground on 1 March 2025.
