= Caolin Blade =

Ireland international rugby union player

Cáolin Blade
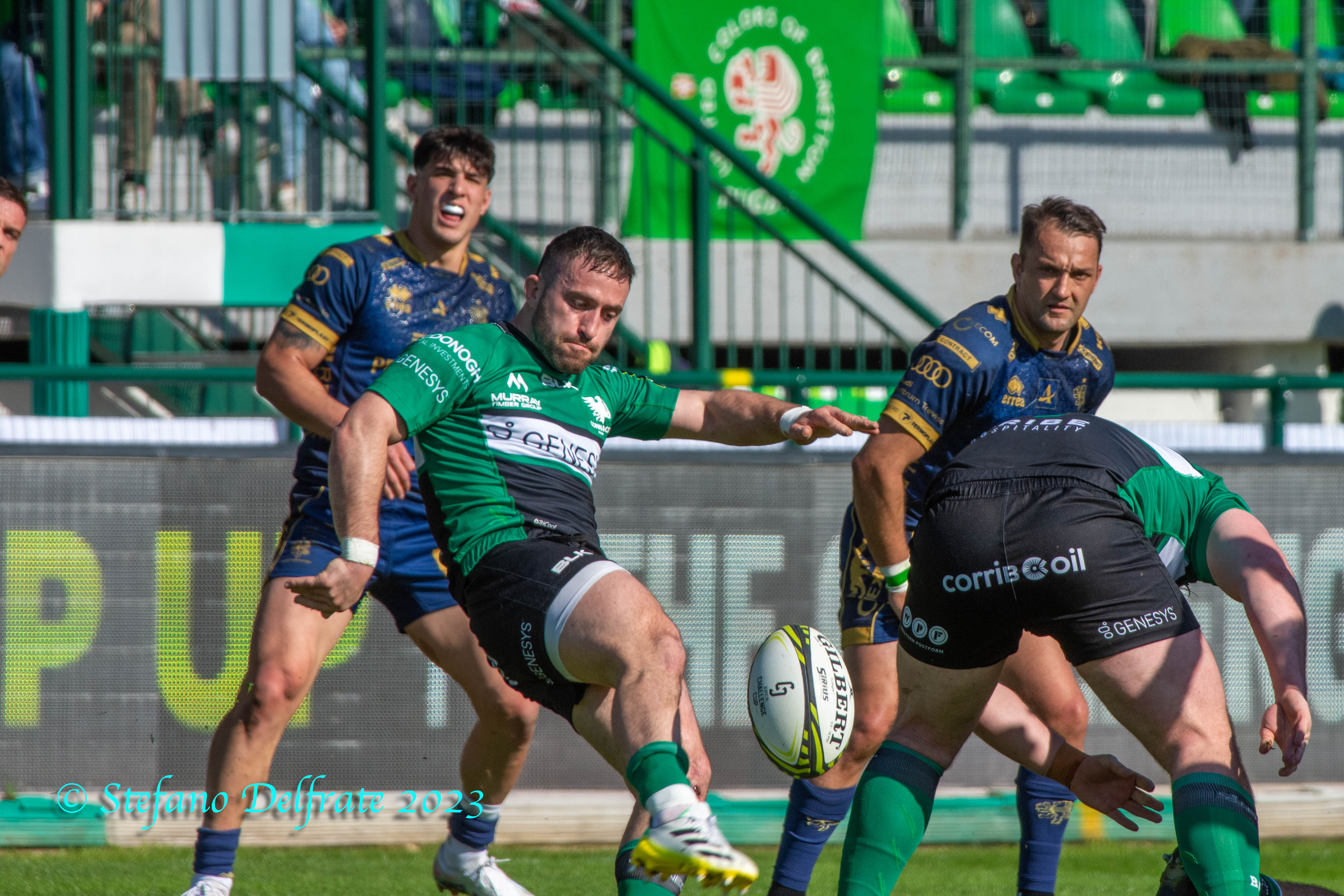
- Blade representing Connacht during the EPCR Challenge Cup
- Born: 29 April 1994 (age 32) Galway, Ireland
- Height: 1.70 m (5 ft 7 in)
- Weight: 80 kg (176 lb; 12 st 8 lb)
- School: Athenry Vocational School

Rugby union career
- Position: Scrum-half
- Current team: Connacht
Senior career
Years	Team	Apps	(Points)
2014–	Connacht	221	(270)
- Correct as of 28 February 2026
International career
Years	Team	Apps	(Points)
2021–	Ireland	4	(0)
2022	Ireland Wolfhounds	1	(0)
- Correct as of 8 November 2025

Cáolin Blade (born 29 April 1994) is an Irish professional rugby union player who plays as a scrum-half for United Rugby Championship club Connacht and the Ireland national team.

== Early life ==
Blade grew up in Monivea, a village in County Galway. He attended Athenry Vocational School in nearby Athenry. In addition to rugby, Blade also played Gaelic football and hurling at under-age level.

Blade started out in rugby with local junior club Monivea, where his father played out half and brother have also played at scrum-half. He played with them until 2013, moving to All-Ireland League club Galwegians after entering Connacht's academy.

== Professional career ==
=== Connacht ===
Having already played for the province's second tier side, the Connacht Eagles, Blade joined Connacht's academy at the start of the 2013–14 season. Blade largely featured for the Eagles throughout the year but made his debut for the senior team in the final game of the season, coming on as a replacement in 45–20 defeat to the Ospreys.

In his second year, Blade featured for the senior team more regularly. He made his European debut in a 2014–15 Rugby Challenge Cup game against Exeter Chiefs on 25 October 2015. Blade made his first start for the senior team on 13 December 2014, playing against Bayonne in France. Despite head coach Pat Lam having changed the entire starting team, Connacht came from behind to win 27–29, with Blade scoring two tries, his first scores for the province. He came on as a replacement against Irish rivals Leinster a week later, his only appearance in the 2014–15 Pro12. In total, Blade made one league appearance and five in the Challenge Cup, with all but one of these coming from the bench.

In January 2015, it was announced that Blade had signed his first full contract with Connacht, a deal that sees him join the senior team ahead of the 2015–16 season and runs until summer 2017. He made his first appearance of the season on an away trip to Enisei STM, a team based in Siberia.

=== Ireland ===
Blade has represented Ireland internationally at under-age level. He played for the under-18 clubs side, and later went on to represent the under-19 team.

Blade was named in the Ireland squad for the opening rounds of the 2019 Six Nations. In June 2021 he was called up again to the senior Ireland squad for the Summer tests. Blade made his debut off the bench for the Ireland senior side, in a 71–10 victory over the United States on 10 July 2021.

== Honours ==
Connacht

- 1× Pro12: 2016
