= Shamus Hurley-Langton =

New Zealand rugby union player (born 2000)

- Born: 22 April 2000 (age 26) Taranaki, New Zealand
- Height: 1.83 m (6 ft 0 in)
- Weight: 106 kg (16.7 st; 234 lb)

Rugby union career
- Position: Flanker / Number 8
Senior career
Years	Team	Apps	(Points)
2020–2021	Manawatu	18	(15)
2022–	Connacht	64	(80)
- Correct as of 7 May 2026

Shamus Hurley-Langton (born 22 April 2000) is a New Zealand rugby union player, currently playing for United Rugby Championship and European Rugby Champions Cup side Connacht. He plays as a flanker or number 8.

== Career ==
Hurley-Langton hails from Taranaki in New Zealand, and represents Old Boys University, Te Kawau RFC and Coastal Rugby. Having first been named in the Manawatu squad for the 2020 Mitre 10 Cup as a replacement player following missing out on a contract with Wellington, he won Manawatu's 2020 Rookie of the Year award, and was named in a wider training squad for the Hurricanes. Having made nine appearances in 2020, he made a further nine appearances for Manawatu in 2021, having been named in the squad for the 2021 Bunnings NPC.

He signed for Connacht ahead of the 2022–23 United Rugby Championship. In May 2026, Connacht announced a further extension of his contract for an undefined period.
