= Byron Ralston =

Australian rugby union player

- Born: Byron Ralston; 3 May 2000 (age 26) Darwin, Northern Territory, Australia
- Height: 184 cm (6 ft 0 in)
- Weight: 94 kg (207 lb; 14 st 11 lb)
- School: St Joseph's College Gregory Terrace

Rugby union career
- Position(s): Centre, Wing
- Current team: Connacht
Senior career
Years	Team	Apps	(Points)
2019-2022	Western Force	22	(35)
2022-	Connacht	39	(40)
- Correct as of 24 March 2026

Byron Ralston (born 3 May 2000 in Australia) is an Australian rugby union player who plays for Connacht in Ireland.

Previously, he played for the Force in Global Rapid Rugby and the Super Rugby AU competition. His original playing position is wing. He was named in the Force squad for the Global Rapid Rugby competition in 2020.

Ralston, who is Ireland qualified (by way of a Grandmother from County Donegal), was signed on a Two Year deal by Connacht Rugby in March 2022, starting the 2022/23 season. He started his first game for Connacht on 17 September 2022 against Ulster. Ralston has appeared mainly on the Wing for Connacht, but has shown his utility making several appearances at Outside Centre also.

On 25 April 2024, Connacht announced Ralston had extended his contract by two years until Summer 2026.
