= Oisín McCormack =

Irish rugby union player

- Born: 21 February 2001 (age 25) Ballinasloe, County Galway
- Height: 1.83 m (6 ft 0 in)
- Weight: 100 kg (15 st 10 lb)
- School: Garbally College

Rugby union career
- Position: Flanker
- Current team: Connacht
Senior career
Years	Team	Apps	(Points)
2022–	Connacht	3	(5)
2026	Harlequins	3	(5)
- Correct as of 21 February 2026
International career
Years	Team	Apps	(Points)
2021	Ireland U20	4	(0)

Oisín McCormack (born 21 February 2001) is an Irish rugby union player for Connacht in the URC. McCormack's primary position is Flanker

== Connacht ==
McCormack was named as a member of the Connacht academy for the 2021–22 season. He made his debut for Connacht in Round 1 of the 2022-23 European Rugby Challenge Cup against Newcastle Red Bulls. He scored his first try in the 91st minute of the match against Zebre Parma in the Stadio Sergio Lanfranchi on 31 January 2026.

== Harlequins ==
On 3 February 2026, it was announced that McCormack had gone on a short term loan to English Prem side Harlequins. He made his debut for Quins on 7 February 2026 scoring a try on his debut.
