= Shayne Bolton =

Ireland international rugby union player

- Born: 29 June 2000 (age 26) South Africa
- Height: 1.88 m (6 ft 2 in)
- Weight: 100 kg (16 st; 220 lb)
- School: Hoërskool Eldoraigne

Rugby union career
- Position(s): Wing, Centre
Senior career
Years	Team	Apps	(Points)
2021–	Connacht	32	(60)
- Correct as of 24 March 2026
International career
Years	Team	Apps	(Points)
2025	Ireland A	2	(10)
2025–	Ireland	1	(10)
- Correct as of 24 March 2026

Shayne Bolton (born 29 June 2000) is an Irish professional rugby union player, currently playing for United Rugby Championship and European Rugby Champions Cup side Connacht. He originally played centre. Bolton now plays on the wing, usually the left wing.

== Connacht ==
Bolton joined Connacht in June 2021 having previously played in the Varsity Cup for Shimlas in South Africa. He made his debut for Connacht in Round 6 of the 2021–22 United Rugby Championship against the Ospreys, scoring a try.

== Ireland ==
Bolton has had Irish citizenship from birth through his Irish-born grandmother Noirin Stapleton who hailed from Blackrock in Dublin. Therefore upon joining Connacht he qualified to represent the Irish rugby team. He was named in the Emerging Ireland squad for their tour of South Africa in 2024, but missed out due to injury. Bolton was then named as a training panelist in the Irish squad for the Autumn Internationals in October 2024. Bolton was called up to the Irish squad as cover in week two of the Guinness Six Nations in February 2025. Bolton was named in an Ireland ‘A’ team to face an England ‘A’ team on February 23, 2025, and went on to score a try in the game.

On June 4, 2025, Bolton was called-up to the Irish squad for the summer internationals against Georgia and Portugal. Bolton won his first cap for Ireland against Portugal on 12 July, 2025, and scored two tries in the game. Bolton was included as a training panelist, then upgraded to a full member following injuries, in the Ireland squad ahead of the 2025 Autumn Internationals. Further to this Bolton was named in an Ireland XV squad to play Spain on November 8.
