= Shane Jennings (rugby union, born 2001) =

Irish rugby union player

- Born: 14 January 2001 (age 25) Ballinasloe, County Galway, Ireland
- Height: 191 cm (6 ft 3 in)

Rugby union career
- Position: Centre
Senior career
Years	Team	Apps	(Points)
2019–	Connacht	30	(25)
- Correct as of 20 March 2026
International career
Years	Team	Apps	(Points)
2021	Ireland U20	4	(5)
2021	Ireland Sevens	2	(0)
- Correct as of 28 November 2021

Shane Jennings (born 14 January 2001) is an Irish rugby union player, currently playing for United Rugby Championship and European Rugby Champions Cup side Connacht. His preferred position is centre.

== National team ==
Jennings represents the Ireland national rugby sevens team on the World Rugby Sevens Series. He debuted for the national sevens team in 2021.

== Early life ==
Jennings was born in Ballinasloe, County Galway. He attended Garbally College. Jennings has played for Ballinasloe RFC and Garbally College. Shane won an All Ireland minor medal with Galway in 2018 and earning the man of the match award for his display in the final in Croke Park.
