= Oran McNulty =

Irish rugby union player

- Born: 16 January 2000 (age 26) Mendip, England
- Height: 1.78 m (5 ft 10 in)
- Weight: 90 kg (14 st 2 lb)

Rugby union career
- Position: Wing
Senior career
Years	Team	Apps	(Points)
2021–2024	Connacht	15	(10)
- Correct as of 16 May 2024
International career
Years	Team	Apps	(Points)
2020	Ireland U20	3	(0)

Oran McNulty (born 16 January 2000) is an English-born Irish rugby union player, currently playing for Pro14 and European Rugby Champions Cup side Connacht. He plays on the wing.

== Connacht ==
McNulty was named in the Connacht Academy ahead of the 2020–21 season. It is his third year in the academy. He made his Connacht debut in Round 15 of the 2020–21 Pro14 against Edinburgh.
