= Dylan Tierney-Martin =

Irish rugby union player

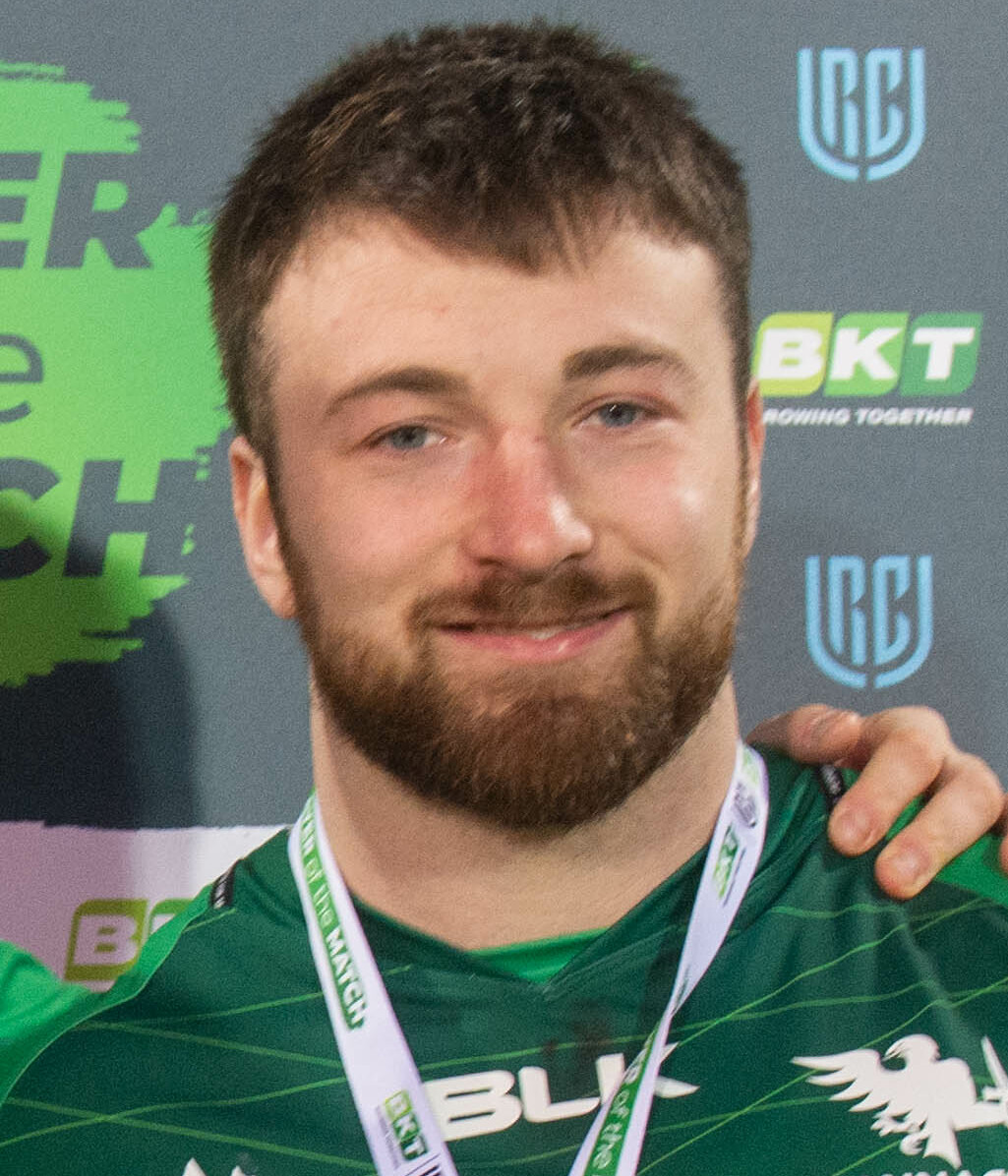
- 2022-23 United Rugby Championship, Round 14 Zebre Parma vs Connacht Rugby, 2023
- Born: 20 June 1999 (age 27) Galway, Ireland
- Height: 1.80 m (5 ft 11 in)
- Weight: 101 kg (15.9 st; 223 lb)

Rugby union career
- Position: Hooker
Senior career
Years	Team	Apps	(Points)
2021–	Connacht	69	(90)
- Correct as of 28 February 2026
International career
Years	Team	Apps	(Points)
2018–2019	Ireland U20	11	(30)
- Correct as of 23 March 2021

Dylan Tierney-Martin (born 20 June 1999) is an Irish rugby union player, currently playing for Pro14 and European Rugby Champions Cup side Connacht. He plays at hooker.

== Connacht ==
Tierney-Martin was named in the Connacht Academy ahead of the 2020–21 season. It is his third year in the academy. He made his Connacht debut in Round 16 of the 2020–21 Pro14 against Scarlets.
