= David Hawkshaw =

Irish rugby union player

- Born: 3 July 1999 (age 27) Dublin, Ireland
- Height: 1.75 m (5 ft 9 in)
- Weight: 85.91 kg (13.529 st; 189.4 lb)
- School: Belvedere College
- Notable relative: Sarah Hawkshaw (sister) Daniel Hawkshaw (brother)

Rugby union career
- Position: Centre
Senior career
Years	Team	Apps	(Points)
2020–2022	Leinster	12	(27)
2022–	Connacht	10	(28)
- Correct as of 29 December 2022
International career
Years	Team	Apps	(Points)
2019	Ireland U20s	3	(5)
- Correct as of 3 November 2020

David Hawkshaw (born 3 July 1999) is an Irish rugby union player, currently playing for Irish provincial side Connacht in the URC. His preferred position is centre. He went to school in Belvedere College and played schools rugby there.

== Leinster ==
Hawkshaw signed an academy contract for Leinster in 2018, becoming a 3rd-year academy player in August 2020. He made his Leinster debut in Round 4 of the 2020–21 Pro14 against Glasgow Warriors.
