= Diarmuid Kilgallen =

Irish rugby union player

- Born: 3 August 2000 (age 26) Eadestown, County Kildare Ireland
- Height: 1.93 m (6 ft 4 in)
- Weight: 92 kg (203 lb; 14 st 7 lb)
- School: Cistercian College Roscrea

Rugby union career
- Position: Wing
Amateur team(s)
Years	Team	Apps	(Points)
- Naas RFC
Senior career
Years	Team	Apps	(Points)
2019–2024	Connacht	23	(60)
2024–	Munster	16	(35)
- Correct as of 03 October 2026

Diarmuid Kilgallen (born 3 August 2000) is an Irish rugby union player, currently playing for United Rugby Championship and European Rugby Champions Cup side Munster. He plays on the wing.

== Connacht ==
Kilgallen joined the Connacht Academy in 2019 and made his debut for the Connacht senior team in the final round of the 2019–20 Pro14 against Munster, having been announced as a late replacement in the starting XV for Matt Healy. He was also named in the Ireland U20s side for 2020 U20 Six Nations.

== Munster ==
Kilgallen made his Munster debut against the All Blacks XV on 2/11/2024 but he sustained a wrist injury ruling him out for several weeks.

He made his competitive debut for Munster in the Champions Cup pool game away to Northampton Saints, during which he scored two tries

Kilgallen made his United Rugby Championship debut away to Dragons RFC where he scored his first United Rugby Championship try, helping Munster to a 12-38 victory over the home side.

Kilgallen made scored his fourth try for Munster during the province's narrow defeat to The Hollywood Bets Sharks, which they ultimately lost on penalties.
