= Sean Jansen =

Ireland rugby union player

- Born: Sean Jansen; 10 May 1999 (age 27) Dunedin, New Zealand
- Height: 6 ft 3 in (191 cm)
- Weight: 18 st 7 lb (259 lb; 117 kg)
- School: King's High School and Otago Boys' High School

Rugby union career
- Position: Back Row
- Current team: Connacht
Senior career
Years	Team	Apps	(Points)
2022–2023	Leicester Tigers	15	(25)
2023–	Connacht	39	(70)
- Correct as of 31 January 2026
International career
Years	Team	Apps	(Points)
2025-	Ireland A	2	(0)
2026-	Ireland	3	(5)
- Correct as of 14 November 2026

Sean Jansen (born 10 May 1999) is a rugby player who plays for Connacht in the United Rugby Championship. He previously played for Leicester Tigers in Premiership Rugby. His preferred position is back row.

Although born in New Zealand, Jansen plays for the Ireland team internationally as he holds an Irish passport through his grandparents, and parents, who were born in Monasterevin and Belfast.

== Career ==
Jansen previously played for North Otago in New Zealand featuring for them in the 2021 Lochore Cup Final.

Jansen signed for Leicester on 23 February 2022. He made his Leicester debut on 18 March 2022 in a 36–28 loss to Newcastle Falcons in the Premiership Rugby Cup, and was noted for his ball carrying and tackling. He made his full Premiership Rugby debut against Harlequins on 23 April 2022, playing number 8 in a 26–20 loss. Jansen scored his first try for Leicester on 27 September 2022 in a 38-17 win against Wasps in the Premiership Rugby Cup.

On 10 March 2023 Jansen's signature was announced by Connacht on a two-year deal starting in the summer of 2023. He made his debut for Ireland, scoring a try, against Japan in the 2026 Nations Championship Southern Hemisphere Series on 11 July 2026.
