= Paul Boyle (rugby union) =

Irish rugby union player

- Born: 14 January 1997 (age 29) Dublin, Ireland
- Height: 1.90 m (6 ft 3 in)
- Weight: 107 kg (16.8 st; 236 lb)
- University: NUIG

Rugby union career
- Position: Back-row
Amateur team(s)
Years	Team	Apps	(Points)
- Gorey
–	Lansdowne		
Senior career
Years	Team	Apps	(Points)
2018–	Connacht	128	(170)
- Correct as of 28 February 2026
International career
Years	Team	Apps	(Points)
2017	Ireland U20	9	(10)
2021–	Ireland	1	(0)
2025-	Ireland A	1	(5)
- Correct as of 8 November 2025

Paul Boyle (born 14 January 1997) is an Irish rugby union player for United Rugby Championship and European Rugby Challenge Cup side Connacht. He can play across the back-row.

== Early life ==
Boyle was born in Dublin South.

He first began playing rugby at age 7 with Gorey RFC.

Boyle came through the underage ranks for Leinster and was a member of their sub-academy, whilst also playing club rugby with Lansdowne in the All-Ireland League, but was never offered a place in Leinster’s full academy.

== Professional ==
Boyle joined Connacht's academy ahead of the 2017–18 season. He made his senior Connacht debut in January 2018 against provincial rivals Munster. Boyle's performances for Connacht during the early months of the 2018–19 season saw him rewarded with his first professional contract with the province, which led to him graduating from year two of the academy and join the senior squad until at least June 2021.

== Ireland ==
Boyle captained Ireland under-20s at the 2017 World Rugby Under 20 Championship, where they finished ninth overall. In June 2021 he was called up to the senior Ireland squad for the Summer tests. Boyle made his debut off the bench for the Ireland senior side, in a 71–10 victory over the United States on 10 July 2021.
