= Cathal Forde =

Irish rugby union player

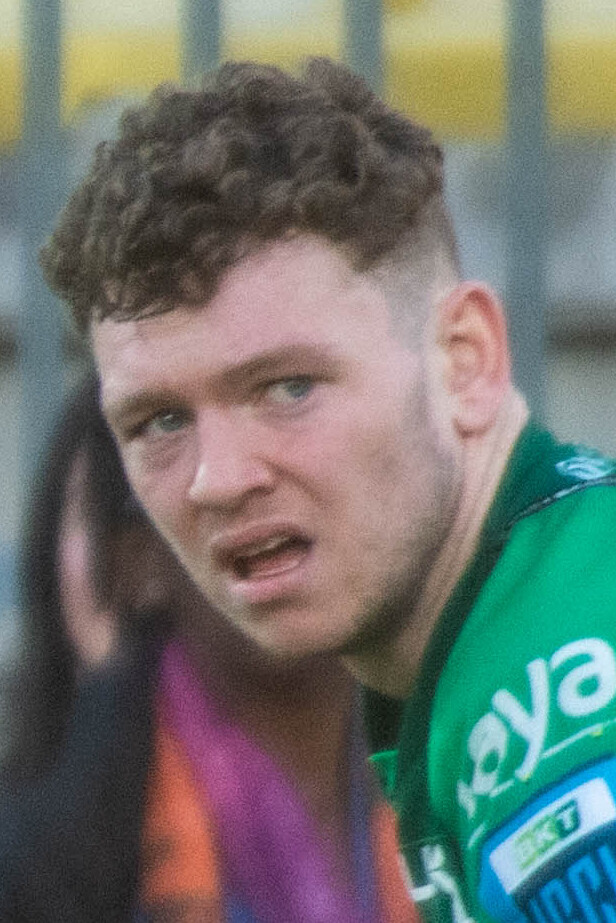
- Forde in 2023
- Born: 11 April 2001 (age 25) Galway, Ireland
- Height: 1.88 m (6 ft 2 in)
- Weight: 100 kg (16 st; 220 lb)
- School: The Jes/Colaiste Iognaid

Rugby union career
- Position(s): Centre, Fly-half
Amateur team(s)
Years	Team	Apps	(Points)
2007-	Galway Corinthians RFC		
Senior career
Years	Team	Apps	(Points)
2022–	Connacht	66	(114)
- Correct as of 20 March 2026
International career
Years	Team	Apps	(Points)
2021	Ireland U20	5	(5)
2022	Barbarians	1	(0)
2025-	Ireland A	2	(0)
- Correct as of 05 February 2026

Cathal Forde (born 11 April 2001) is an Irish rugby union player, currently playing for United Rugby Championship side Connacht. He plays as a centre or fly-half.

== Early career ==
Forde was educated at The Jes/Colaiste Iognaid, Galway, playing rugby for their Junior & Senior Rugby Teams. Post school, he continued to play for the local club (where he first played Rugby at the age of 6) Galway Corinthians RFC, in the AIL, where he was named AIL Division 2B player of the season for 2021/2022.

== Connacht ==
Forde was named as a member of the Connacht academy for the 2021–22 season. He made his debut for Connacht in Round 11 of the 2021–22 United Rugby Championship against Glasgow Warriors. He scored his first 2 tries against Cell C Sharks in the Sportsground on January 7, 2023, and was named URC player of the match.

== Ireland ==
Forde was selected as a development player in the 2025 Six Nations Ireland squad. He was selected alongside Ulster backrower James McNabney, Leinster centre Hugh Cooney, and fellow Connacht player Ben Murphy. The four will not partake in any of the games in the 2025 Six Nations, however they will be a part of pre-tournament training camps.
