= Dave Heffernan =

Irish rugby union player (born 1991)

- Born: David Heffernan; 31 January 1991 (age 35) Ballina, County Mayo, Ireland
- Height: 1.88 m (6 ft 2 in)
- Weight: 110 kg (17 st 5 lb)
- School: Blackrock College
- University: University of Galway

Rugby union career
- Position(s): Hooker, Flanker
- Current team: Connacht
Amateur team(s)
Years	Team	Apps	(Points)
- Ballina RFC
–	Buccaneers		
–	Lansdowne FC		
Senior career
Years	Team	Apps	(Points)
2012–	Connacht	237	(75)
- Correct as of 20 March 2026
International career
Years	Team	Apps	(Points)
2010–11	Ireland U20	2	(0)
2015–	Emerging Ireland	3	(0)
2017–	Ireland	7	(5)
2019	Barbarians F.C.	1	(5)
–	Ireland Wolfhounds	1	(0)
- Correct as of 15 November 2022

Dave Heffernan (born 31 January 1991) is a rugby union player from Ireland. As of 2024, he plays for Irish provincial side Connacht in the Pro14. Heffernan started his career playing as a flanker, before moving to the position of hooker. He plays his club rugby for Buccaneers. Heffernan has represented the Ireland U20 team.

Heffernan studied at University of Galway. He played Gaelic football for Ballina Stephenites while growing up, with his father Ivan a former inter-county player who won All-Ireland titles with Mayo and UCD. His uncle Niall also played for Mayo, managed Ballina Stephenites to several Mayo Senior Football Championship titles and managed the Mayo under-20 football team.

== Career ==
=== Connacht ===
The County Mayo native went to school in Blackrock College before playing with Connacht at Under-19 and Under-20 level. Heffernan joined the Connacht Academy in 2011. Heffernan had played in the 2011–12 Pro12, making his first start against Scarlets on 2 March 2012, while still an academy player. He played as a blindside flanker, and stayed on the field for the full 80 minutes. After having spent two years in the Connacht Academy, Heffernan progressed to the full senior set-up, ahead of the 2013–14 Pro12 season.

Before the start of the 2013–14 season, Heffernan was converted from a back-row forward into a hooker. He made his first senior appearance in his new position on 26 October 2013, coming on as a replacement for Seán Henry against Leinster. In total, Heffernan made 12 appearances in the 2013–14 league, 11 of these coming from the bench. In April 2014, Heffernan signed a contract extension with Connacht to keep him with the side until the end of the 2014–15 season.

=== International ===
Internationally, Heffernan has represented Ireland at Under-20 level. He played against France in the 2011 Six Nations Under 20s Championship, starting at blindside flanker.
