= Jack Aungier =

Irish rugby union player (born 1998)

- Born: Jack Aungier; 20 November 1998 (age 27) Dublin, Ireland
- Height: 1.88 m (6 ft 2 in)
- Weight: 120 kg (19 st; 260 lb)
- School: St. Fintan's

Rugby union career
- Position: Tighthead Prop
Amateur team(s)
Years	Team	Apps	(Points)
- Suttonians
2017―2018	Leinster A		
Senior career
Years	Team	Apps	(Points)
2019–2020	Leinster	5	(0)
2020–2026	Connacht	100	(55)
2026-	Munster	3	(0)
- Correct as of 17 October 2026
International career
Years	Team	Apps	(Points)
2025-	Ireland A	2	(0)
2025-	Ireland	1	(0)
- Correct as of 05 February 2026

Jack Aungier (born 20 November 1998) is an Irish rugby union player who currently plays for Munster Rugby. On the 26th of January 2025, he was called up to join the Irish squad ahead of their 2025 Six Nations campaign. He plays as a prop.

== Early life ==
Aungier attended St. Fintan's High School and participated in the Leinster Schools Rugby Senior Cup with the school. At the age of just 16, Aungier made his debut for the Ireland under-18s team.

== Leinster ==
Whilst still in Leinster's academy, Aungier was selected on the bench for their round 5 2019–20 Pro14 fixture against Welsh side Dragons on 1 November 2019, and he replaced Michael Bent in the 52nd minute in the provinces 50–15 win.

== Connacht ==
In May of 2020, it was reported that Aungier would be joining Connacht Rugby during the then postponed 2019/2020 Pro14 season. He made his debut for Connacht against Ulster during the resumed Pro14 season on the 23rd of August 2020, scoring the final try of a bonus point victory for the province.

== Munster ==
On 13 May 2026, Aungier signed a two-year deal with Munster Rugby. He made his debut with Munster on 3rd October 2026 against Vodacom Bulls in Thomond Park.
