= Sam Illo =

Irish rugby union player

- Born: 16 February 2001 (age 25) Dublin, Ireland
- Height: 1.86 m (6 ft 1 in)
- Weight: 121 kg (19.1 st; 267 lb)
- School: Wesley College, Dublin

Rugby union career
- Position: Prop
Senior career
Years	Team	Apps	(Points)
2022–	Connacht	49	(10)
- Correct as of 21 May 2022
International career
Years	Team	Apps	(Points)
2021	Ireland U20	5	(5)
2026-	Ireland	3	(0)
- Correct as of 14 November 2026

Sam Illo (born 16 February 2001) is an Irish rugby union player, currently playing for United Rugby Championship and European Rugby Champions Cup side Connacht. He plays as a prop.

Illo joined Connacht in July 2021, having previously played for the Leinster academy. He debuted for Connacht in Round 4 of the 2021–22 European Rugby Champions Cup against Stade Français.

He made his senior international debut for Ireland from the bench against Japan in the 2026 Nations Championship Southern Hemisphere Series.
