= Ben Murphy (rugby union, born 2001) =

Irish rugby union player

- Born: 23 April 2001 (age 25) Bray, Ireland
- Height: 1.76 m (5 ft 9 1/2 in)
- Weight: 80 kg (180 lb; 12 st 8 lb)
- School: Presentation College, Bray
- Notable relative(s): Richie Murphy (father); Jack Murphy(brother); John Murphy (great uncle)

Rugby union career
- Position: Scrum-half
2021–2024	Leinster	9	(5)
2024–	Connacht	30	(50)
- Correct as of 31 January 2026
International career
Years	Team	Apps	(Points)
2020	Ireland U20s	3	(0)
2025	Ireland	2	(5)
2025-	Ireland A	1	(0)
- Correct as of 8 November 2025

Ben Murphy (born 23 April 2001) is an Irish rugby union player, currently playing for United Rugby Championship and European Rugby Challenge Cup side Connacht Rugby. His preferred position is scrum-half.

== Leinster ==
The son of Ireland U20 coach Richie Murphy, Murphy was named in the Leinster Rugby academy for the 2021–22 season. He made his debut in Round 18 of the 2021–22 United Rugby Championship against Munster. While a member of the Leinster sub-academy, Murphy joined Munster on a short-term loan to cover for injuries. In May 2024, it was announced that he would be moving to Connacht ahead of the 2024–25 season.

== Ireland ==
Murphy was selected as a development player for Ireland in the 2025 Six Nations. He was selected alongside Ulster backrower James McNabney, Leinster scrum-half Hugh Cooney, and fellow Connacht player Cathal Forde. The four will not partake in any of the games in the 2025 Six Nations, however they will be a part of pre-tournament training camps.
