= David O'Connor (rugby union) =

Irish rugby union player

- Born: David O'Connor; 19 May 1995 (age 31) Dublin, Ireland
- Height: 1.93 m (6 ft 4 in)
- Weight: 120 kg (19 st; 260 lb)
- School: Blackrock College
- Notable relative: Alan O'Connor (brother)

Rugby union career
- Position(s): Lock, Flanker
Amateur team(s)
| Years | Team | Apps | (Points) |
- St Mary's
| – | Lansdowne | | |
Senior career
| Years | Team | Apps | (Points) |
| 2019–2022 | Ulster | 15 | (0) |
| 2022 | → Ealing Trailfinders (loan) | 0 | (0) |
| 2022-2024 | Ealing Trailfinders | 18 | (0) |
| 2024– | Connacht | 22 | (5) |
- Correct as of 7 July 2026

David O'Connor (born 19 May 1995) is an Irish rugby union player who plays for Connacht. He plays primarily as a lock, but can also play in the back-row.

Born in Dublin, O'Connor attended Blackrock College and was part of the team that won the Leinster Schools Rugby Senior Cup in 2013 and 2014, alongside future Ulster teammate Nick Timoney. He joined the Leinster academy in 2015, but was released in 2017 to pursue other opportunities, though he continued to play rugby with St Mary's in the amateur All-Ireland League, once playing against older brother Alan, before moving across Dublin to join Lansdowne.

O'Connor moved north to join Ulster on a development contract in June 2019, ahead of the 2019–20 season, and he made his senior competitive debut for the province in their 29–5 win against Welsh side Scarlets on 29 November 2019, coming off the bench to replace Matty Rea with eight minutes to go in the round 7 2019–20 Pro14 fixture. He made seven appearances in his first season with the province, and eight in his second. He underwent shoulder surgery in early 2021. He joined Ealing Trailfinders on loan in February 2022. He was released by Ulster at the end of the 2021–22 season, and joined the Trailfinders on a permanent basis.

On 3 May 2024, O'Connor would return home to Ireland to join province Connacht back in the United Rugby Championship for the 2024–25 season.
