= Joe Joyce (rugby union) =

English rugby union player

- Born: 7 February 1994 (age 32) Southmead, Bristol, England
- Height: 1.95 m (6 ft 5 in)
- Weight: 119 kg (18.7 st; 262 lb)

Rugby union career
- Position: Lock
Senior career
Years	Team	Apps	(Points)
2014–2023	Bristol Bears	150	(40)
2023–2026	Connacht	50	(25)
2026–	Gloucester	0	(0)
- Correct as of 20 March 2026
International career
Years	Team	Apps	(Points)
2014	Ireland U20s	3	(0)
- Correct as of 8 August 2018

Joe Joyce (born 7 February 1994) is a professional rugby union player. He plays lock for Irish United Rugby Championship side Connacht having previously played for English Premiership Rugby side Bristol Bears.

Joyce featured in England Schools & Clubs U18s & U19s as well as playing for Filton College RFC. Joyce joined the Bristol Bears Academy ahead of the 2012-13 season. He was a member of the PDG Gold group before graduating into the senior squad and made his league debut in the English Premiership during the 2014-15 season. In 2018 Joyce won the Players' Player of the Year Award.

He has played over 100 times for Bristol Bears and played for the Bears' 2016–17 season when they were relegated from the Premiership to the RFU Championship for the 2017-18 season. He signed to Bristol through the 2022 season.

Joyce is known as "The King of the Mead" by Bristol fans after a commentator coined the phrase. He since played over 150 games for Bristol and scored eight tries.

On 17 June 2022, after 8 seasons with Bristol, Joyce would depart his home club to join Irish province Connacht on a three-year deal in the URC competition from the 2023-24 season. He was named Player of the Match in his United Rugby Championship debut for Connacht against the Ospreys in October 2023.

On 29 January 2026, Joyce would return to the English Premiership with local rivals Gloucester ahead of the 2026-27 season.
