= Oisín Dowling =

Irish rugby union player

- Born: 24 June 1997 (age 29) Dublin, Ireland
- Height: 1.96 m (6 ft 5 in)
- Weight: 109 kg (17 st 2 lb; 240 lb)
- School: St Michael's College

Rugby union career
- Position: Lock
- Current team: Connacht
Amateur team(s)
Years	Team	Apps	(Points)
2016–	Lansdowne		
2017–2018	Leinster A	5	(0)
- Correct as of 5 June 2021
Senior career
Years	Team	Apps	(Points)
2019 - 2020	Leinster	6	(0)
2020-2026	Connacht	77	(10)
- Correct as of 1 Apr 2026
International career
Years	Team	Apps	(Points)
2017	Ireland U20	9	(15)
- Correct as of 18 June 2017

Oisín Dowling (born 23 June 1997) is an Irish rugby union player, who currently plays for Connacht Rugby. He plays as a lock or flanker.

== Underage rugby ==
Dowling attended St Michael's College, Dublin and played alongside fellow Leinster locks Ross Molony and James Ryan there. Dowling spent time in the Leinster sub-academy after leaving schools, before being promoted to the full academy. He was selected for the Ireland U20 team in 2017, a year where they struggled, finishing fourth in the under-20 Six Nations and tenth in the World Championship.

== Professional career ==
Dowling was part of the Celtic Cup-winning Leinster 'A' side in 2018, a year in which he was also part of Lansdowne's historic clean sweep of the All-Ireland League, All-Ireland Cup, Leinster Senior League and Leinster Senior Cup. Dowling made his senior Leinster debut in January 2019 in a victory against fellow Irish province Ulster.
