= Hugh Gavin (rugby union) =

Ireland international rugby union player (born 2004)

- Born: 10 January 2004 (age 22) Galway, Ireland
- Height: 1.92 m (6 ft 4 in)
- Weight: 103 kg (227 lb)

Rugby union career
- Position: Centre
- Current team: Connacht
Senior career
Years	Team	Apps	(Points)
2024–	Connacht	10	(5)
- Correct as of 12 July 2025
International career
Years	Team	Apps	(Points)
2023-2024	Ireland U20	20	(30)
2024	Emerging Ireland	1	(5)
2025	Ireland	1	(10)
- Correct as of 12 July 2025

Hugh Gavin (born 10 January 2004) is an Irish professional rugby union footballer who plays as a centre for Connacht Rugby.

== Club career ==
From Salthill in County Galway, he played Gaelic Football as well as rugby union as a youngster. He initially played in the wing before later transitioning into the centre. He signed a professional contract with Connacht Rugby in April 2024 having been a part of the club's rugby pathway since a young age following in the steps of his father Barry who played number eight for the club.

He was promoted to the senior Connacht side for the 2024–25 season although he suffered an injury that required surgery on just his second appearance in November 2024. He later also featured that season for the club in the European Challenge Cup.

== International career ==
He played for two years for Ireland at under-20 level, and played all 20 games for the side in 2023 and 2024, scoring six tries, and played at the 2024 World Rugby U20 Championship in South Africa. Later that year, he featured for Emerging Ireland on their tour of South Africa.

In February 2025, he scored a try for Ireland A against England A. In June 2025, he was called up to the senior Ireland national rugby union team for their summer tour. Gavin grew up in the affluent neighbourhood of Taylors Hill, Salthill. He is a Chelsea supporter.
