= Josh Murphy (rugby union) =

Irish rugby union player

- Born: 17 February 1995 (age 31) Enniscorthy, Ireland
- Height: 1.97 m (6 ft 5 1/2 in)
- Weight: 110 kg (17 st; 240 lb)
- School: St Michael's College
- University: University College Dublin

Rugby union career
- Position: Blindside Flanker
Amateur team(s)
Years	Team	Apps	(Points)
- UCD
Senior career
Years	Team	Apps	(Points)
2017–2022	Leinster	61	(25)
2022–	Connacht	52	(25)
- Correct as of 28 February 2026
International career
Years	Team	Apps	(Points)
2014–2015	Ireland U20	13	(5)
- Correct as of 21 October 2018

Josh Murphy (born 17 February 1995) is an Irish rugby union player for Pro14 and European Rugby Champions Cup side Leinster. He plays as a blindside flanker.

== Leinster ==
Murphy was added to the Leinster Rugby academy ahead of the 2015–16 season, before earning promotion to the senior team at the end of his three years in the academy ahead of the 2018–19 season.

Murphy made his Leinster Rugby senior debut against Glasgow Warriors in November 2017, and marked his second appearance and first start against Dragons later that month with a try-scoring, man of the match performance.

Alongside his rugby career, Murphy studied for a degree in medicine, completing his medical studies in 2021 and become a registered medical practitioner during the 2023/4 professional rugy season, during which he took a sabbatical.

== Connacht ==
On 31 January 2022 it was announced by Connacht Rugby that Murphy had signed a Two Year deal to join the Province, from Summer 2022.

== Ireland ==
Murphy represented the Ireland Under-20s at both the 2014 and 2015 editions of the World Rugby Under 20 Championship, as well as featuring in 2015 Six Nations Under 20s Championship. He captained Ireland against the Wales Under-20s at the 2015 World Rugby Under 20 Championship, standing in for regular captain Nick McCarthy. He has described that moment as the proudest of his career so far.
