= Chay Mullins =

Irish rugby union player

- Born: 23 January 2002 (age 24) Bristol, England
- Height: 1.91 m (6 ft 3 in)
- Weight: 95 kg (209 lb)

Rugby union career
- Position: Full-back
Amateur team(s)
Years	Team	Apps	(Points)
- Galway Corinthians
Senior career
Years	Team	Apps	(Points)
2022–26	Connacht	16	(25)
2026-	Ulster	3	(15)
- Correct as of 31 October 2026
International career
Years	Team	Apps	(Points)
2022	Ireland U20		
2022	Emerging Ireland		
National sevens team
Years	Team		Comps
2022–25	Ireland		

Chay Mullins (born 23 January 2002) is a rugby union player who plays for Ulster. He formerly played for Connacht and the Ireland national rugby sevens team.

== Early life ==
Born in Bristol, Mullins attended St Mary Redcliffe and Temple School and graduated from SGS Filton.

== Club career ==
Mullins played domestic rugby as part of the Bristol Rugby academy before playing in the Irish Division 2B of the Energia All-Ireland League with Galway Corinthians RFC. In May 2024, he signed professional contract with Connacht Rugby. He marked his debut with a hat-trick against Zebre Parma in December 24. He left Connacht in 2026, signing with Ulster.

== International career ==
Mullins was part of the Irish U20 side that won a grand slam at the 2022 Six Nations Under 20s Championship.

In 2022, he was included in the Emerging Ireland squad for the Toyota Challenge. Later in the year he joined up with the Ireland national rugby sevens team and was part of the bronze medal-winning squad at the Rugby Sevens World Cup in September 2022 in South Africa.

He continued to be part of the Ireland 7s during the 2023 SVNS series. He was part of the Irish team that won the Rugby Europe Sevens Championship Series trophy in July 2023, scoring a last minute try against Great Britain in their final match in Hamburg to ensure Ireland finished top of the standings.

In June 2024, he was confirmed in the Ireland 7s squad for the 2024 Paris Olympics. Mullins scored 2 tries in Pool game against Japan and Quarter-Final match against Fiji.

== Personal life ==
Mullins is eligible to play for Ireland through his grandmother who was from Cavan and his grandfather Richard, who was from County Meath.
