= Josh Ioane =

New Zealand rugby union player (born 1995)

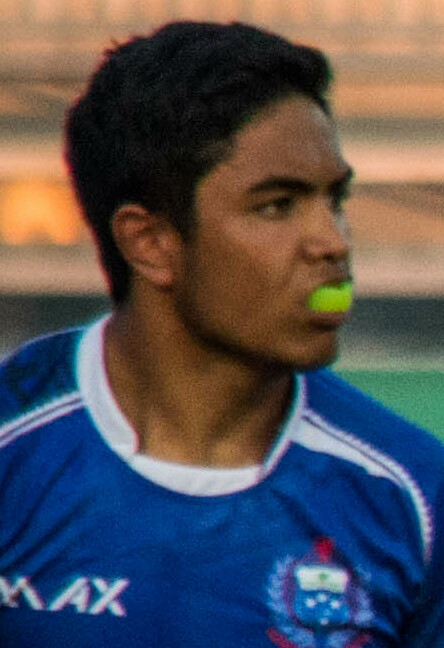
- Born: 11 July 1995 (age 31) Auckland, New Zealand
- Height: 176 cm (5 ft 9 in)
- Weight: 115 kg (254 lb; 18 st 2 lb)
- School: King's College

Rugby union career
- Position(s): Fullback, Flyhalf
- Current team: Connacht Rugby
Senior career
Years	Team	Apps	(Points)
2019–2022	Otago	27	(197)
2017–2021	Highlanders	45	(227)
2022–2024	Chiefs	29	(74)
2024–	Connacht	30	(74)
- Correct as of 13 May 2026
International career
Years	Team	Apps	(Points)
2015	Samoa U20	5	(3)
2019	New Zealand	1	(8)
2022	All Blacks XV	1	(0)
- Correct as of 13 May 2026

Joshua R. Ioane (born 11 July 1995) is a New Zealand rugby union player who plays for Connacht in the United Rugby Championship. His position of choice is fly-half.

== Early life ==
Born in Auckland, Ioane also has family with the Taito's on his Samoan heritage. Ioane moved to Otago for university, after completing high school at King's College. Ioane was a member of his school's first XV from years 11 - 13, also representing New Zealand for touch and rugby league at school level. Ioane was also eligible to represent Samoa in international rugby through heritage, prior to his All Black debut, having previously represented Samoa U20 in 2015.

== Playing career ==
Ioane was signed to the Highlanders for the 2018 Super Rugby season, having played well in his first season for Otago.

After the departure of established All Black Lima Sopoaga from the Highlanders, Ioane became a regular starter for the team during the 2019 Super Rugby season, despite the presence of experienced first-five-eighth, Marty Banks. Ioane was one of the highest points-scorers of the season, with 114 points in the competition.

On 2 July 2019, Ioane was named by head coach Steve Hansen as one of four uncapped players in New Zealand's All Blacks squad for the 2019 Rugby Championship, with utility back Damian McKenzie ruled out for the rest of the year due to a torn ACL. Although named to replace All Black vice-captain Beauden Barrett off the bench against Argentina, Ioane was not brought on to the field, with New Zealand scraping by, winning 20–16.

Having not played any tests during the Rugby Championship, Ioane was left uncapped after the outstanding form of Barrett, as well as Richie Mo'unga. When New Zealand named their squad for the 2019 Rugby World Cup, Ioane was controversially axed, with selectors preferring to take only two first-five-eighths, with Ioane's inexperience deemed to be a risk.

Ioane made his international debut for New Zealand against Tonga on 7 September 2019, having been re-called to prevent injury to Richie Mo'unga. Ioane replaced Beauden Barrett at half-time, scoring 8 points on debut. Ioane's contributions brought New Zealand's points tally to a 92–7 win.

On 31 August 2021, Ioane was signed to the Chiefs for the 2022 Super Rugby Pacific season.

On 10 July 2024, Ioane agrees a move to Ireland to join province Connacht on a one-year contract for the 2024–25 season. It was renewed for a further year for the 2025–26 season.
