= Temi Lasisi =

Irish rugby union player

- Born: Temi Asewunwi Lasisi; 9 May 2001 (age 25) Enniscorthy, Ireland
- Height: 1.83 m (6 ft 0 in)
- Weight: 125 kg (276 lb; 19 st 10 lb)
- School: CBS Enniscorthy

Rugby union career
- Position: Prop
Senior career
Years	Team	Apps	(Points)
2021–2024	Leinster	1	(0)
2024–	Connacht	0	(0)
- Correct as of 09 May 2024
International career
Years	Team	Apps	(Points)
2021–	Ireland U20s	3	(0)
- Correct as of 25 April 2022

Temi Lasisi (born 9 May 2001) is an Irish rugby union player, currently playing for United Rugby Championship and European Rugby Champions Cup side Connacht, having previously represented Leinster. His preferred position is prop.

== Leinster ==
Temi was named in the Leinster Rugby academy for the 2021–22 season. He made his debut in the re-arranged Round 9 of the 2021–22 United Rugby Championship against Ulster. Lasisi had previously played as a Number 8 before moving to prop. A student at Technological University Dublin he played his junior rugby for Enniscorthy before switching to Lansdowne. Previously, Lasisi had wished to be a footballer, before switching to rugby as an eleven year old. On the 9th of May 2024, Connacht announced Lasisi would be joining from Leinster.
