= Matthew Devine =

Irish rugby union player

- Born: 19 February 2002 (age 24) Ballinasloe, County Galway
- Height: 1.80 m (5 ft 11 in)
- Weight: 84 kg (13 st 3 lb)
- School: Garbally College
- Notable relative(s): Michael Devine (father); John Devine (brother)

Rugby union career
- Position: Scrum-half
- Current team: Ulster
Amateur team(s)
Years	Team	Apps	(Points)
- Galway Corinthians RFC
Senior career
Years	Team	Apps	(Points)
2022–2026	Connacht	36	(65)
2026–	Ulster	6	(0)
- Correct as of 31 October 2026
International career
Years	Team	Apps	(Points)
2022	Ireland U20	5	(20)
2026-	Ireland A	2	(5)
- Correct as of 20 November 2026

Matthew Devine (born 19 February 2002) is an Irish rugby union player who currently plays for Ulster in the URC. Devine’s primary position is Scrum-half

== Ireland Under 20’s ==
Devine was on the under 20’s 6 nations squad in 2022 scoring 4 tries from 5 matches, the team won the grand slam for the first time in 3 years under the coaching of Richie Murphy. On this tournament Devine paired up at half back with Leinster player Charlie Tector.

== Connacht ==
Devine was named as a member of the Connacht academy for the 2022-23 season. He made his debut for Connacht in Round 3 of the 2023-24 European Rugby Champions Cup against Lyon. He scored his first 2 tries against Zebre Parma in the Sportsground on April 20, 2024, and was named URC player of the match.

It was announced by Connacht Rugby on 2 February 2026 that Matthew had decided not to extend his contract and would be leaving the club at the end of the 2025-2026 season. On 2 February 2026 it was announced that he would be joining Ulster Rugby starting at the beginning of the 2026-2027 season for at least 1 season until Summer 2027. In going to Ulster he will be pairing up with head coach Richie Murphy who was his head coach during his u20s Grand Slam winning 6 nations tournament in 2022

== Ulster ==
On 2 February 2026 it was announced that he would be joining Ulster Rugby starting at the beginning of the 2026-2027 season for at least 1 season until Summer 2027.
