= 2025–26 Dragons RFC season =

Dragons RFC
- 2025–26 season
- Head coach: Filo Tiatia (interim)
- President: David Wright
- United Rugby Championship: 15th
- Challenge Cup: Semi-final
- Top try scorer: League: several players – 4
- Top points scorer: League: Angus O'Brien – 94
- Highest home attendance: 8,369 (RD 9 v Scarlets)
- Lowest home attendance: 4,188
- Average home attendance: 6,074

The 2025–26 season will be the Dragons RFC's fifth season in the United Rugby Championship, and their 24th season of professional representative rugby. Along with competing in the URC and its Welsh Shield competition, the club will also participate in the European Rugby Challenge Cup.

== United Rugby Championship ==
=== Matches ===
26 September 2025	(1 BP) Ulster (Ireland)	42–21	(Wales) Dragons	Ravenhill Stadium, Belfast
20:05	Try: Izuchukwu 12' c Timoney 28' c McCann 34' c Z. Ward 36' c Doak 42' c Stewart 80+3' c Con: Doak (5) 13', 29', 34', 38', 43'; Flannery 80+4'	Report	Try: Wainwright 1' c Rosser 16' c Lewis-Hughes 49' c Con: De Beer (3) 2', 17', 50'	Attendance: 9,563; Referee: Colby Griffin

3 October 2025	Dragons (Wales)	17–17	(South Africa) Sharks	Rodney Parade, Newport
20:05	Try: Wainwright 15' c O'Brien 26' c Con: De Beer (2/2) 16', 27'; Pen: De Beer (1/1) 66'; Cards: Coleman (yellow card) 73'	Report	Try: Orie 8' c Tshituka 38' c Con: J. Smith (2/2) 9', 39'; Pen: J. Smith (1/1) 19'	Attendance: 4,889; Referee: Filippo Russo

11 October 2025	(1 BP) Glasgow Warriors (Scotland)	49–0	(Wales) Dragons	Scotstoun Stadium, Glasgow
17:30	Try: Steyn 10' c Horne (2) 25' c, 62' m Brown 43' c Hiddleston 47' c Matthews 67' c Con: Hastings (4) 11', 26', 43', 48'; Horne 62'; Lancaster 68'	Report	Cards: Dyer (yellow card) 80+1'	Attendance: 6,802

17 October 2025	(1 BP) Dragons (Wales)	17–24	(Wales) Cardiff (1 BP)	Rodney Parade, Newport
19:45	Try: Coghlan 7' c Carter 72' c Con: De Beer (2) 8', 73'; Pen: O'Brien 80'	Report; Scoreboard	Try: Mann 2' m Faletau 14' c Dan Thomas 20' m Southworth 61' c Con: Sheedy 14'; Ben Thomas 62'	Attendance: 7,483; Referee: Federico Vedovelli (Italy)

25 October 2025	Dragons (Wales)	19–19	(Wales) Ospreys	Rodney Parade, Newport
17:30	Try: R. Williams 38' c Coghlan 60' c Burrows 76' m Con: De Beer (2) 40', 61'	Report	Try: Deaves 15' m Cokanasiga 20' c Hopkins 46' c Con: Edwards (2) 20', 47'; Cards: Kasende (yellow card) 80'	Attendance: 5,511; Referee: Ben Breakspear

28 November 2025	Dragons (Wales)	10–24	(Ireland) Leinster (1 BP)	Rodney Parade, Newport
19:45	Try: Screech 31' c Con: De Beer 32'; Pen: O'Brien 47'	Report	Try: Soroka 4' m Kenny (2) 44' c, 59' m Snyman 78' c Con: Byrne (2) 45', 79'; Cards: Mangan (yellow card) 29'; Penny (yellow card) 38'; McGrath (yellow card) 80'	Attendance: 4,244; Referee: Morne Ferreira (South Africa)

20 December 2025	(1 BP) Dragons (Wales)	48–28	(Ireland) Connacht (1 BP)	Rodney Parade, Newport
19:45	Try: Burrows 17' c Hope (2) 25' c, 61' c Rosser 32' c Penalty try 40+4'; Dyer 51' c Con: O'Brien (5/5) 18', 26', 33', 52', 62'; Pen: O'Brien (2/2) 43' , 46'	Report	Try: Gilbert 1' c Prendergast (2) 66' c, 74' c Jansen 80+2' c Con: Gilbert (4) 1', 67', 75', 80+3'; Cards: Boyle (yellow card) 40+5'	Attendance: 4,188; Referee: Ruairidh Campbell (Scotland)

26 December 2025	Cardiff (Wales)	22–19	(Wales) Dragons (1 BP)	Cardiff Arms Park, Cardiff
15:00	Try: Sebastian 20' c Mann 30' m J Adams 47' c Con: Sheedy (2) 21', 48'; Pen: Sheedy 70'; Cards: McNally (yellow card) 78'	Report	Try: Hope (2) 7' m, 32' c Penalty try 78'; Con: O'Brien 32'; Cards: Keddie (yellow card) 57'	Attendance: 12,125; Referee: Adam Jones (Wales)

1 January 2026	(1 BP) Dragons (Wales)	28–5	(Wales) Scarlets	Rodney Parade, Newport
15:00	Try: de Beer 8' c Burrows 43' c Richards 48' c Roberts 75'; Con: O'Brien (4/4) 9', 55', 49', 78'; Cards: Cuckson (yellow card) 23'	Report	Try: Mee 35' m Cards: Douglas (red card) 42'	Attendance: 8,369; Referee: Ben Connor (Wales)

23 January 2026	Munster (Ireland)	22–20	(Wales) Dragons (1 BP)	Musgrave Park, Cork
19:45	Try: Gleeson 39' c Coombes (2) 57' m, 65' c Con: Butler (2/3) 40', 66'; Pen: Butler 75'	Report	Try: Coghlan 17' c Richards 53' c Con: O'Brien (2/2) 18', 54'; Pen: O'Brien (2) 11', 30'; Cards: Beddall (yellow card) 19'	Attendance: 8,422; Referee: Hollie Davidson (Scotland)

31 January 2026	Ospreys (Wales)	19–13	(Wales) Dragons (1 BP)	Brewery Field, Bridgend
19:45	Try: Morgan-Williams 33' c Lloyd 74' m Giles 80' c Con: Walsh (2/3) 34', 80+1'	Report	Try: De Beer 18' c Con: O'Brien 19'; Pen: O'Brien (2) 47', 58'; Cards: Diamani (yellow card) 73'	Attendance: 5,281; Referee: Ben Connor (Wales)

28 February 2026	Dragons (Wales)	15–15	(Italy) Benetton	Rodney Parade, Newport
17:30	Try: Douglas 11' c Inisi 80+1' m Con: O'Brien 12'; Pen: O'Brien 69'; Cards: Douglas (red card) 33'; Inisi (yellow card) 39'	Report	Try: Ratave (2) 2' m, 29' m Gallagher 50' m Cards: Fekitoa (yellow card) 15'	Attendance: 7,016; Referee: Eoghan Cross (Scotland)

21 March 2026	(1 BP) Stormers (South Africa)	29–21	(Wales) Dragons	DHL Stadium, Cape Town
17:30	Try: Feinberg-Mngomezulu (2) 9' c, 17' c Roos 49' c Simelane 59' m Con: Feinberg-Mngomezulu (3/3) 10' 18' 50'; Pen: Feinberg-Mngomezulu 44'		Try: Davies 25' c Young 53' c Dyer 72' c Con: O'Brien (3/3) 26', 54', 72'	Attendance: 15,079; Referee: Andrew Brace

28 March 2026	(1 BP) Lions (South Africa)	42–26	(Wales) Dragons (1 BP)	Ellis Park Stadium, Johannesburg
14:30	Try: Mahashe 5' m Kriel 27' c Smith 50' c Steyn (2) 55' m, 63' c Erich Cronje 67' m Con: Smith (3/6) 27', 51', 63'; Pen: Smith (2/2) 18', 39'		Try: Owen (2) 15' c, 32' c Dyer 47' c, 70' m Con: O'Brien (3/4) 16', 33', 48'; Cards: Dyer (yellow card) 55'	Attendance: 3,212; Referee: Robbie Jenkinson (Ireland)

17 April 2026	Dragons (Wales)	7–47	(South Africa) Bulls (1 BP)	Rodney Parade, Newport
19:45	Try: Inisi 23' c Con: Evans (1/1) 24'		Try: Papier 11' c Grobbelaar 37' c Coetzee 44' c Van Staden (2) 57' c, 74' c Williams 77' c Petersen 80' c Con: Pollard (3/4) 11', 45', 58'; Kriel (3/3) 75', 78', 80+1'	Attendance: 5,892; Referee: Sam Grove-White (Scotland)

24 April 2026	Zebre Parma (Italy)	18–19	(Wales) Dragons	Stadio Sergio Lanfranchi, Parma
19:45	Try: Di Bartolomeo 43' m Locatelli 70' c Con: Da Re (1/2) 71'; Pen: Da Re (2/2) 14', 53'		Try: Rosser 24' c Carter 68' c Richards 80+3' m Con: O'Brien (2/3) 25', 68'; Cards: Douglas (yellow card) 43'	Attendance: 3,417; Referee: Ru Campbell (Scotland)

9 May 2026	Dragons (Wales)	15–24	(Scotland) Edinburgh	Rodney Parade, Newport
19:45	Try: Lewis 28' c Keddie 44' m Con: O'Brien (1/2) 29'; Pen: O'Brien (1/1) 8'		Try: Ashman 18' c Currie 39' c van der Merwe (2) 49' m 74' m Con: Thompson (2/4) 19', 40'; Cards: Richardson (yellow card) 52'; Venter (yellow card) 65'	Attendance: 7,079; Referee: Filippo Russo (Italy)

16 May 2026	(1 BP) Scarlets (Wales)	35–35	(Wales) Dragons (1 BP)	Parc y Scarlets, Llanelli
17:15	Try: Plumtree 2' c 15' c Macleod 51' c Taylor 59' c Page 75' c Con: Hawkins (5/5) 2', 16', 51', 59', 76'; Cards: Davies (yellow card) 58'; Leggatt-Jones (yellow card) 63'		Try: Young 4' c Coghlan 13' c Wainright 36' m Penalty try 58'; Con: O'Brien (2/3) 5', 13'; Pen: O'Brien (3/3) 9', 43', 64'	Attendance: 7,418; Referee: Ben Whitehouse (Wales)

=== Table ===
Pos	Team	Pld	W	D	L	PF	PA	PD	TF	TA	TB	LB	Pts	Qualification
1	Glasgow Warriors	18	13	0	5	479	338	+141	72	48	11	2	65	Qualification for the Champions Cup and knockout stage
2	Leinster (CH)	18	12	0	6	515	370	+145	77	51	13	2	63	Qualification for the Champions Cup and knockout stage
3	Stormers	18	12	1	5	504	344	+160	63	48	9	1	60	Qualification for the Champions Cup and knockout stage
4	Bulls (RU)	18	12	0	6	576	406	+170	82	59	10	1	59	Qualification for the Champions Cup and knockout stage
5	Munster	18	11	0	7	396	376	+20	59	51	8	3	55	Qualification for the Champions Cup and knockout stage
6	Cardiff	18	11	0	7	353	372	−19	52	52	7	4	55	Qualification for the Champions Cup and knockout stage
7	Lions	18	10	1	7	532	473	+59	73	70	9	3	54	Qualification for the Champions Cup and knockout stage
8	Connacht	18	10	0	8	442	395	+47	62	56	10	4	54	Qualification for the Champions Cup and knockout stage
9	Ulster	18	9	1	8	494	420	+74	72	60	10	4	52	Qualification for the Challenge Cup
10	Sharks	18	8	1	9	467	428	+39	71	57	9	3	46	Qualification for the Challenge Cup
11	Ospreys	18	7	2	9	376	454	−78	55	69	4	3	39	Qualification for the Challenge Cup
12	Edinburgh	18	7	0	11	362	439	−77	57	66	6	4	38	Qualification for the Challenge Cup
13	Benetton	18	6	2	10	327	493	−166	41	71	4	1	33	Qualification for the Challenge Cup
14	Scarlets	18	4	2	12	361	460	−99	52	63	3	5	28	Qualification for the Challenge Cup
15	Dragons	18	3	4	11	350	481	−131	46	71	4	4	28	Qualification for the Challenge Cup
16	Zebre	18	2	0	16	312	587	−275	43	85	3	4	15	Qualification for the Challenge Cup

Updated to match(es) played on 16 May 2026. Source: UnitedRugby.com
Rules for classification: Tiebreakers for teams tied on points: 1) Number of matches won 2) The difference between points for and points against 3) The number of tries scored 4) The most points scored 5) The difference between tries for and tries against 6) The fewest red cards received 7) The fewest yellow cards received.

2025–26 United Rugby Championship Regional Shield tables
(Wales) Welsh Shield
	Team	P	W	D	L	PF	PA	PD	TF	TA	TBP	LBP	Pts	Pos overall
1	(Wales) Ospreys	6	4	1	1	145	117	+28	21	17	2	1	21	11
2	(Wales) Cardiff	6	4	0	2	137	135	+2	20	20	3	1	20	6
3	(Wales) Dragons	6	1	2	3	131	124	+7	17	19	2	3	13	15
4	(Wales) Scarlets	6	1	1	4	124	161	–37	19	21	2	3	11	14
If teams are level at any stage, tiebreakers are applied in the following order: 1. number of matches won 2. the difference between points for and points against 3. the number of tries scored 4. the most points scored 5. the difference between tries for and tries against 6. the fewest red cards received 7. the fewest yellow cards received
Green background indicates teams currently leading the regional shield. Upon the conclusion of the regular season, these teams win their respective regional shields. (S) : URC Shield champion

== European Challenge Cup ==
EPCR Challenge Cup Pool 2
Pos	Team	Pld	W	D	L	PF	PA	PD	TF	TA	TB	LB	Pts	Qualification
1	(Italy) Benetton (2)	4	4	0	0	182	89	+93	24	11	3	0	19	Home round of 16
2	(England) Newcastle Red Bulls (6)	4	3	0	1	75	78	−3	11	11	1	0	13	Home round of 16
3	(Wales) Dragons (13)	4	2	0	2	96	148	−52	14	21	1	0	9	Away round of 16
4	(France) Perpignan (16)	4	1	1	2	111	107	+4	14	14	1	1	8	Away round of 16
5	(South Africa) Lions	4	1	1	2	90	93	−3	11	12	1	1	8	
6	(France) Lyon	4	0	0	4	87	126	−39	13	17	1	2	3	

Source: EPCR
Rules for classification: Tiebreakers for teams tied on points: 1) Number of matches won; 2) Difference between points for and against; 3) Total number of points for; 4) Aggregate number of points scored in matches between tied teams; 5) Number of matches won excluding the first match, then the second and so on until the tie is settled.

=== Pool matches ===
7 December 2025	(1 BP) Perpignan (France)	41–17	(Wales) Dragons	Stade Aime Giral, Perpignan
14:00	Try: Hall 12' c Diaby 28' c Joseph 50' m Chinarro 59' m Le Corvec 76' c Con: Kretchmann (2/4) 13', 29'; Aprasidze (1/1) 77'; Pen: Kretchmann (1/2) 45'; Cards: Paia'aua (red card) 14'	Report	Try: Westwood 55' c Austin (2) 64' m, 82' m Con: O'Brien (1/3) 55'; Cards: Carter (yellow card) 69'	Attendance: 6,215; Referee: Federico Vedovelli (Italy)

14 December 2025	Dragons (Wales)	23–21	(France) Lyon (1 BP)	Rodney Parade, Newport
15:15	Try: Keddie 65' m Burrows 73' m Keddie 78' m Con: O'Brien (1/3) 79'; Pen: O'Brien (2/3) 10', 25'; Cards: J. Rosser (yellow card) 22'; De Beer (yellow card) 56'	Report	Try: Roux 31' c Mathiron 43' c Maalo 56' c Con: Cassang (2/2) 32', 44'; Gonzalez (1/1) 57'; Cards: Maraku (yellow card) 72'	Attendance: 4,028; Referee: Filippo Russo (Italy)

10 January 2026	(1 BP) Benetton (Italy)	74–21	(Wales) Dragons	Stadio Comunale di Monigo, Benetton
18:30	Try: Izekor 14' c Ratave 18' c Fekitoa 33' m Odogwu (2) 37' m, 55' c Umaga (2) 40' c, 64' c Lynagh (2) 51' m, 67' c Marin (2) 75' c, 80+2' c Con: Umaga (8/11) 15', 19', 41', 56', 65', 68', 75', 80+3'; Pen: Umaga (1/1) 3'	Report	Try: Burrows 29' c Dyer 58' c Lewis-Hughes 78' c Con: De Beer (2/2) 30', 59'; J. Lloyd (1/1) 78'	Attendance: 3,754; Referee: Benoit Rousselet (France)

16 January 2026	(1 BP) Dragons (Wales)	35–12	(England) Newcastle Red Bulls	Rodney Parade, Newport
20:00	Try: Dyer (2) 30' c, 53' c Coghlan 47' c Penalty try 68'; Richards 78' c Con: O'Brien (4/4) 31', 48', 54', 79'	Report	Try: Benitez Cruz 34'; Wade 36'; Con: Ethan Grayson (1/2) 37'; Cards: Hodgson (yellow card) 46'; Gordon (yellow card) 67'; Parsons (yellow card) 68'	Attendance: 5,296; Referee: Christopher Allison (South Africa)

=== Knockout stage ===
Dragons qualified for the round of sixteen when they confirmed a third-place finish in Pool 2 in Round 4 with a 35–12 victory over Newcastle Red Bulls. As the third place team with the lowest points total, they are seeded thirteenth, earning an away tie in the last sixteen against French giants, Stade Francais.

Round of 16
1	(France) Montpellier	53
16	(France) Perpignan	13
8	(Ireland) Connacht	29
9	(South Africa) Sharks	12
5	(Italy) Zebre Parma	31
12	(France) Pau	15
4	(France) Stade Français	31
13	(Wales) Dragons	36
3	(Ireland) Ulster	28
14	(Wales) Ospreys	24
6	(England) Newcastle Red Bulls	18
11	(France) La Rochelle	26
2	(Italy) Benetton	38
15	(Wales) Cardiff	35
7	(England) Exeter Chiefs	31
10	(Ireland) Munster	21

Quarter-finals
1	(France) Montpellier	45
8	(Ireland) Connacht	22
5	(Italy) Zebre Parma	32
13	(Wales) Dragons	35
3	(Ireland) Ulster	41
11	(France) La Rochelle	24
2	(Italy) Benetton	41
7	(England) Exeter Chiefs	44

Semi-finals
1	(France) Montpellier	18
13	(Wales) Dragons	12
3	(Ireland) Ulster	29
7	(England) Exeter Chiefs	12

Final
1	(France) Montpellier	59
3	(Ireland) Ulster	26

Round of 16

5 April 2026
12:30

Stade Français (France)	31–36	(Wales) Dragons
Try: Ezeala (3) 37' c, 41' c, 61' c Tanga 44' c Con: Louis Foursans-Bourdette (3/3) 38', 42', 45'; Henry (1/1) 62'; Pen: Louis Foursans-Bourdette (1/1) 52'		Try: O'Brien 8' c Coghlan 19' c Coleman 56' c Dee 69' c Jones 79' c Con: O'Brien (4/4) 9', 20', 57', 80'; Pen: O'Brien (1/1) 4'

Stade Jean-Bouin, Paris
Attendance: 4,432
Referee: Morne Ferreira (South Africa)

Quarter-final

11 April 2026
20:00

Zebre Parma (Italy)	32–35	(Wales) Dragons
Try: Trulla 25' c Bertaccini 37' c Krumov 78' m Quattrini 80+1' c Con: Da Re (3/4) 26', 38', 80+2'; Pen: Da Re (2/1) 13', 63'	Report	Try: Inisi 14' c Keddie (2) 30' c, 51' c Dee 65' m Con: O'Brien (3/4) 15', 31', 52'; Pen: O'Brie (3/3) 10', 44', 77'; Cards: Richards (yellow card) 23'; Inisi (yellow card) 32'

Stadio Sergio Lanfranchi, Parma
Attendance: 2,524
Referee: Luke Pearce (England)

Semi-final

3 May 2026
13:30

Montpellier (France)	18–12	(Wales) Dragons
Try: Duguid 25' c Bernadet 67' m Con: Vincent (1/2) 26'; Pen: Vincent (2/3) 10', 42'; Cards: Abuladze (yellow card) 57'	Report	Try: Owen (2) 31' m, 73' c Con: O'Brien (1/2) 73'

GGL Stadium, Montpellier
Attendance: 8,103
Referee: Andrew Brace (Ireland)
