= 2025–26 United Rugby Championship =

Rugby competition

- Countries: Ireland; Italy; Scotland; South Africa; Wales
- Date: 26 September 2025 – 19 June 2026
- Champions: (Ireland) Leinster Rugby (10th title)
- Runners-up: (South Africa) Bulls
- Matches played: 151
- Attendance: 1,692,734 (average 11,210 per match)
- Highest attendance: 53,682 (Stormers v Bulls, Round 9)
- Lowest attendance: 1,711 (Lions v Scarlets, Round 4)
- Tries scored: 1003 (average 6.6 per match)
- Top point scorer: (South Africa) Sacha Feinberg-Mngomezulu (158)
- Top try scorer: (South Africa) Evan Roos (12)

Official website
- unitedrugby.com

The 2025–26 United Rugby Championship was the 25th season of the professional rugby union competition currently known as the United Rugby Championship, the highest level domestic club rugby competition in South Africa, Ireland, Scotland, Wales and Italy. This season was also the fifth season under that name, and the fifth with the current collection of teams. It began on 26 September 2025 and will end on 20 June 2026.

Leinster entered the competition as the reigning champions, and holders of the URC Irish Shield and kicked off the competition with the first match away to Stormers. Glasgow Warriors, Sharks and Cardiff were defending the Scottish-Italian, South African and Welsh Shields respectively.

In a repeat of the 2025 Grand Final, Leinster beat Bulls 36–7 at Croke Park in the 2026 United Rugby Championship Grand Final to become the first two-time winner in the URC era, and a record ten-time winner of the competition in all its formats.

== Format ==
The 2025–26 season once again consists of 21 rounds: 18 rounds of regular season play, followed by three rounds of play-offs. The competition runs from September 2025 to June 2026, with the regular season ending in mid May. The season also contains breaks for the 2025 end-of year internationals, the 2026 Men's Six Nations (though some matches are played during 'fallow' weekends) and the various matchdays of the 2025–26 European Rugby Champions Cup and Challenge Cup. The season does not overlap with the 2026 Nations Championship. Some South African teams will play derby matches throughout the Men's Six Nations window, as this is a competition in which the South Africa national team are not involved.

There are four regional pools: The Irish Shield pool (featuring the four Irish teams), the Welsh Shield pool (featuring the four Welsh teams), the South African Shield pool (featuring the four South African teams) and the shared Italian-Scottish Shield pool (featuring the two Italian and two Scottish sides). The pools serve two functions; they guarantee a full slate of home-and-away derby matches for each team (which are often the best attended and most remunerative fixtures for the clubs involved), and they award a minor Regional Shield trophy to the top team in each pool, which thereby functions as a de facto national professional championship in three of the four pools, and a cross-border regional championship in the Scottish–Italian pool. The winner of each Shield will be determined solely from the games played amongst the teams within their regional pool, mirroring the format of the old Interprovincial Championship in Ireland.

In Scotland, the two pool games involving both Scottish sides, played back to back over the Christmas and New Year period, also decide the 1872 Cup, effectively a Scottish national professional championship. The two Italian sides have no individual trophy to play for.

Teams therefore play six matches against their regional pool rivals, in a home and away double round-robin. The remaining 12 matches are made up by a single round robin of the remaining teams, consisting of an even number of six home and six away matches against all the sides from the other pools, with home advantage alternating each year. Generally each team will play two of the teams in each of the other pools at home, and two away, with the matches away to South African teams usually held back to back as a 'mini-tour' to reduce travel. The South African teams in turn have six European matches, which again are often arranged as a series of 'mini-tours' of two or three matches to reduce air travel.

For the United Rugby Championship itself, there is one main league table. The top eight sides in that table at the end of the regular season will qualify for the play-off quarter-finals, followed by semi-finals and a grand final. The playoffs are seeded, with the top four seeds having home advantage at the quarter-final stage. In the semi-finals and final, the better ranked club in each tie has home advantage, so the number one team in the ladder will retain home advantage for as long as it progresses in the competition, including the final (unlike the Premiership Rugby competition in England where the final is held at the neutral Twickenham Stadium).

The Regional Shield pools have no direct link to the play-offs and by extension the Championship itself, or European qualification, and it is technically possible to win a Regional Shield but not contest the play-offs.

== Teams ==
Team	Country	Coach / Director of Rugby	Captain	Stadium	Capacity	Position last season
Benetton	Italy	(Scotland) Calum MacRae	(Italy) Michele Lamaro (Italy) Sebastian Negri	Stadio Comunale di Monigo	5,000	10th
Bulls	South Africa	(South Africa) Johan Ackermann	(South Africa) Ruan Nortjé	Loftus Versfeld Stadium	51,762	Runner-up
Cardiff	Wales	(South Africa) Corniel van Zyl	(Wales) Liam Belcher	Cardiff Arms Park	12,125	9th
Connacht	Ireland	(England) Stuart Lancaster	(Ireland) Cian Prendergast	The Sportsground	12,129	13th
Dragons	Wales	(New Zealand) Filo Tiatia	(Wales) Ben Carter (Wales) Angus O'Brien	Rodney Parade	8,700	16th
Edinburgh	Scotland	(South Africa) Sean Everitt	(Scotland) Magnus Bradbury	Edinburgh Rugby Stadium; Murrayfield Stadium	7,800; 67,144	Quarter-finalist
Glasgow Warriors	Scotland	(South Africa) Franco Smith	(Scotland) Kyle Steyn	Scotstoun Stadium; Hampden Park	7,351; 51,866	Semi-finalist
Leinster	Ireland	(Ireland) Leo Cullen	(Ireland) Caelan Doris	Aviva Stadium	51,700	Champion (9th title)
Lions	South Africa	(South Africa) Ivan van Rooyen	(South Africa) Francke Horn	Ellis Park Stadium	62,567	11th
Munster	Ireland	(New Zealand) Clayton McMillan	(Ireland) Tadhg Beirne	Thomond Park; Musgrave Park	25,600; 8,008	Quarter-finalist
Ospreys	Wales	(Wales) Mark Jones	(Wales) Jac Morgan	Brewery Field	8,000	12th
Scarlets	Wales	(Wales) Dwayne Peel	(Wales) Josh Macleod	Parc y Scarlets	14,870	Quarter-finalist
Sharks	South Africa	(New Zealand) John Plumtree	(South Africa) Siya Kolisi	Kings Park Stadium	52,000	Semi-finalist
Stormers	South Africa	(South Africa) John Dobson	(South Africa) Salmaan Moerat	Cape Town Stadium; Danie Craven Stadium	55,000; 16,000	Quarter-finalist
Ulster	Ireland	(Ireland) Richie Murphy	(Ireland) Iain Henderson	Ravenhill Stadium	18,196	14th
Zebre	Italy	(Italy) Massimo Brunello	(Italy) Giovanni Licata	Stadio Sergio Lanfranchi	5,000	15th

Location of Irish, Scottish and Welsh teams: 2025–26 United Rugby Championship (the United Kingdom and Ireland)	Location of Italian teams: 2025–26 United Rugby Championship (Northern Italy) Location of South African teams: 2025–26 United Rugby Championship (South Africa)

== URC league standings ==
Final standings:

Pos	Team	Pld	W	D	L	PF	PA	PD	TF	TA	TB	LB	Pts	Qualification
1	Glasgow Warriors	18	13	0	5	479	338	+141	72	48	11	2	65	Qualification for the Champions Cup and knockout stage
2	Leinster (CH)	18	12	0	6	515	370	+145	77	51	13	2	63	Qualification for the Champions Cup and knockout stage
3	Stormers	18	12	1	5	504	344	+160	63	48	9	1	60	Qualification for the Champions Cup and knockout stage
4	Bulls (RU)	18	12	0	6	576	406	+170	82	59	10	1	59	Qualification for the Champions Cup and knockout stage
5	Munster	18	11	0	7	396	376	+20	59	51	8	3	55	Qualification for the Champions Cup and knockout stage
6	Cardiff	18	11	0	7	353	372	−19	52	52	7	4	55	Qualification for the Champions Cup and knockout stage
7	Lions	18	10	1	7	532	473	+59	73	70	9	3	54	Qualification for the Champions Cup and knockout stage
8	Connacht	18	10	0	8	442	395	+47	62	56	10	4	54	Qualification for the Champions Cup and knockout stage
9	Ulster	18	9	1	8	494	420	+74	72	60	10	4	52	Qualification for the Challenge Cup
10	Sharks	18	8	1	9	467	428	+39	71	57	9	3	46	Qualification for the Challenge Cup
11	Ospreys	18	7	2	9	376	454	−78	55	69	4	3	39	Qualification for the Challenge Cup
12	Edinburgh	18	7	0	11	362	439	−77	57	66	6	4	38	Qualification for the Challenge Cup
13	Benetton	18	6	2	10	327	493	−166	41	71	4	1	33	Qualification for the Challenge Cup
14	Scarlets	18	4	2	12	361	460	−99	52	63	3	5	28	Qualification for the Challenge Cup
15	Dragons	18	3	4	11	350	481	−131	46	71	4	4	28	Qualification for the Challenge Cup
16	Zebre	18	2	0	16	312	587	−275	43	85	3	4	15	Qualification for the Challenge Cup

Updated to match(es) played on 16 May 2026. Source: UnitedRugby.com
Rules for classification: Tiebreakers for teams tied on points: 1) Number of matches won 2) The difference between points for and points against 3) The number of tries scored 4) The most points scored 5) The difference between tries for and tries against 6) The fewest red cards received 7) The fewest yellow cards received.

== Regional shields ==
Regional shield standings are based entirely on performances against other teams within the same conference. Therefore, only six games for each team count towards the regional shields. Leinster, Glasgow Warriors, Sharks and Cardiff entered their respective Regional Shield competitions as reigning champions.

Glasgow Warriors became the first side to confirm their victory in their regional shield for the 2025–26 season following Round 10 and a 26–21 victory over Zebre. It is Glasgow's fourth, and fourth successive, URC Scottish-Italian Shield success briefly bringing them level with Leinster's record for regional shield titles.

In Round 12, Lions gained an unassailable lead to confirm their first ever URC South African Shield title. They became the fourth South African side to lift the trophy in five seasons.

In Round 15, Leinster's 29–21 victory over Irish rivals Ulster confirmed their record fifth URC Irish Shield title. Leinster remain the only side to lift the URC Irish Shield.

Finally, in Round 17, Ospreys claimed the URC Welsh Shield, beating Scarlets in their final Welsh Shield fixture 27–20 to pip rivals Cardiff by a single point. It was their third Welsh Shield title.

2025–26 United Rugby Championship Regional Shield tables
(Ireland) Irish Shield
	Team	P	W	D	L	PF	PA	PD	TF	TA	TBP	LBP	Pts	Pos overall
1	(Ireland) Leinster	6	5	0	1	166	120	+46	23	15	4	0	24	2
2	(Ireland) Munster	6	3	0	3	126	91	+35	16	15	2	1	15	5
3	(Ireland) Connacht	6	2	0	4	131	157	–27	18	21	2	2	12	8
4	(Ireland) Ulster	6	2	0	4	131	147	–16	18	22	1	2	11	9
(Italy) (Scotland) Italian x Scottish Shield
	Team	P	W	D	L	PF	PA	PD	TF	TA	TBP	LBP	Pts	Pos overall
1	(Scotland) Glasgow Warriors	6	5	0	1	163	72	+91	25	9	4	1	25	1
2	(Scotland) Edinburgh	6	3	0	3	132	120	+12	20	17	3	1	16	12
3	(Italy) Benetton	6	3	0	3	98	141	–43	10	19	1	1	14	13
4	(Italy) Zebre Parma	6	1	0	5	130	190	–60	17	26	2	3	9	16
(South Africa) South African Shield
	Team	P	W	D	L	PF	PA	PD	TF	TA	TBP	LBP	Pts	Pos overall
1	(South Africa) Lions	6	4	0	2	168	173	–5	21	25	2	1	19	7
2	(South Africa) Sharks	6	3	0	3	143	153	–10	21	19	3	1	16	10
3	(South Africa) Stormers	6	3	0	3	132	144	–12	16	19	2	0	14	3
4	(South Africa) Bulls	6	2	0	4	165	138	+27	24	19	3	1	12	4
(Wales) Welsh Shield
	Team	P	W	D	L	PF	PA	PD	TF	TA	TBP	LBP	Pts	Pos overall
1	(Wales) Ospreys	6	4	1	1	145	117	+28	21	17	2	1	21	11
2	(Wales) Cardiff	6	4	0	2	137	135	+2	20	20	3	1	20	6
3	(Wales) Dragons	6	1	2	3	131	124	+7	17	19	2	3	13	15
4	(Wales) Scarlets	6	1	1	4	124	161	–37	19	21	2	3	11	14
If teams are level at any stage, tiebreakers are applied in the following order: 1. number of matches won 2. the difference between points for and points against 3. the number of tries scored 4. the most points scored 5. the difference between tries for and tries against 6. the fewest red cards received 7. the fewest yellow cards received
Green background indicates teams currently leading the regional shield. Upon the conclusion of the regular season, these teams win their respective regional shields. (S) : URC Shield champion

== European qualification ==
Priority order for 2026–27 European Rugby Champions Cup qualification is as follows:

- 2025–26 United Rugby Championship champions
- the 2025–26 European Rugby Champions Cup champions (if a URC team but not already qualified as above)
- the 2025–26 EPCR Challenge Cup champions (if a URC team but not already qualified as above)
- the next highest-ranked teams during regular season play not already qualified as above, until eight overall qualifiers have been selected.

As a result of the priority order, the top five teams in the regular season standings are guaranteed qualification to the Champions Cup, with the remaining three places dependant on cup results this season.

The eight remaining teams qualify for the 2026–27 EPCR Challenge Cup.

The following teams have qualified for the stated 2026–27 European competition.

2026–27 European Rugby Champions Cup	2026–27 EPCR Challenge Cup
(South Africa) Bulls (Wales) Cardiff (Ireland) Connacht (Scotland) Glasgow Warriors (Ireland) Leinster (South Africa) Lions (Ireland) Munster (South Africa) Stormers	(Italy) Benetton Rugby (Wales) Dragons (Scotland) Edinburgh (Wales) Ospreys (Wales) Scarlets (South Africa) Sharks (Italy) Zebre (Ireland) Ulster

== Match grid ==
The following are the fixtures and results for the 2025–26 United Rugby Championship regular season:

Home \ Away	BEN	BUL	CAR	CON	DRA	EDI	GLA	LEI	LIO	MUN	OSP	SCA	SHA	STO	ULS	ZEB
Benetton		—	—	—	—	**14–15**	**16–14**	29–26	41–15	15–45	31–19	20–20	—	16–31	—	**21–15**
Bulls	45–19		40–7	—	—	—	—	39–31	**33–43**	34–31	53–40	—	**41–12**	**19–32**	—	54–19
Cardiff	17–8	—		14–8	**22–19**	20–19	—	8–7	33–20	—	**24–21**	**17–21**	—	22–16	—	—
Connacht	26–15	27–28	—		—	—	15–10	**23–34**	—	**26–7**	21–14	31–14	44–17	—	**24–29**	—
Dragons	15–15	7–47	**17–24**	48–28		15–24	—	10–24	—	—	**19–19**	**26–5**	17–17	—	—	—
Edinburgh	**43–0**	17–19	—	5–26	—		**3–21**^{[b]}	—	—	—	19–17	24–19	33–28	—	19–40	**31–30**
Glasgow Warriors	**31–10**	21–12	40–17	—	49–0	**24–12**^{[b]}		38–17	—	31–22	—	—	35–19	—	—	**47–10**
Leinster	—	—	—	**52–17**	—	28–20	—		31–7	**14–31**^{[a]}	68–14	36–19	31–5	—	**24–20**^{[c]}	50–26
Lions	—	**17–52**	—	33–21	42–26	54–17	54–12	—		—	—	29–18	**34–22**	**24–10**	49–31	—
Munster	—	—	23–20	**17–15**	22–20	20–19	—	**8–13**^{[a]}	24–17		—	—	—	21–27	**41–14**	21–7
Ospreys	—	—	**33–22**	—	**19–13**	—	17–42	—	24–24	10–26		**27–20**	21–17	—	21–10	24–0
Scarlets	—	21–23	**24–28**	—	**35–35**	—	23–0	—	—	21–34	**19–26**		—	0–34	27–22	36–17
Sharks	46–7	**21–12**	21–15	—	—	—	—	—	**22–23**	45–0		29–19		**36–24**	26–34	54–19
Stormers	—	**13–8**	—	24–33	29–21	33–14	48–12	35–0	**34–27**	—	26–10	—	**19–30**		—	—
Ulster	47–13	28–7	21–14	**19–26**	42–21	—	22–26	**21–29**^{[c]}	—	**28–3**	—	—	—	38–38		—
Zebre	**23–37**	—	14–29	15–31	18–19	**31–28**	**21–26**	—	22–20	—	—	—	—	13–31	12–28	

URC Shield fixtures in bold; Colours: Green: home team win; Yellow: draw; Red: away team win; Blue: upcoming matches

== Regular season ==
The matches for the regular season were announced on 21 May 2025, the earliest fixture reveal in the competition's history. The first match was the visit of Leinster to South Africa to take on Stormers at Cape Town Stadium on Friday, 26 September 2025.

=== Round 1 ===
26 September 2025	(1 BP) Stormers (South Africa)	35–0	(Ireland) Leinster	Cape Town Stadium
18:00	Try: Ungerer 45' c Roos (2) 63' c, 68' c Matthee 70' m Con: Matthee (3/4) 45', 64', 69'; Pen: Matthee (3/5) 7', 33', 42'	Report; Highlights	Cards: Deegan (yellow card) 63'; T. O'Brien (yellow card) 67'	Attendance: 13,529; Referee: Gianluca Gnecchi (Italy)

26 September 2025	(1 BP) Ulster (Ireland)	42–21	(Wales) Dragons	Ravenhill Stadium, Belfast
20:05	Try: Izuchukwu 12' c Timoney 28' c McCann 34' c Z. Ward 36' c Doak 42' c Stewart 80+3' c Con: Doak (5/5) 13', 29', 34', 38', 43'; Flannery (1/1) 80+4'	Report; Highlights	Try: Wainwright 1'; Rosser 16'; Lewis-Hughes 49'; Con: De Beer (3/3) 2', 17', 50'	Attendance: 9,563; Referee: Griffin Colby (South Africa)

26 September 2025	(1 BP) Glasgow Warriors (Scotland)	35–19	(South Africa) Sharks	Scotstoun Stadium, Glasgow
20:05	Try: Rowe 14' c McDowall 32' c Darge 49' c Dobie 70' c Penalty try 78' c Con: Horne (4/4) 15', 33', 51', 71'	Report; Highlights	Try: Van der Merwe 9' m V. Tshituka 40' c Am 66' c Con: Hendrikse (2/3) 41', 67'; Cards: Mavesere (yellow card) 77'; Mazibujo (yellow card) 79'	Attendance: 6,775; Referee: Craig Evans (Wales)

27 September 2025	(1 BP) Bulls (South Africa)	53–40	(Wales) Ospreys (1 BP)	Loftus Versfeld Stadium, Pretoria
13:00	Try: Coetzee 8' c, 21' m Grobbelaar 39' c, 45' m, 58' c Jooste 51' m, 72' m Serfontein 61' m Else 68' c Con: Johannes (4/9) 9', 40', 59', 69'	Report; Highlights	Try: Giles 2' m, 80' c Keiran Williams 6' c, 35' c Walsh 30' c Morse 66' c Con: Edwards (5/6) 6', 31', 36', 66', 80+1'	Attendance: 2,992; Referee: Federico Vedovelli (Italy)

27 September 2025	(1 BP) Zebre (Italy)	31–28	(Scotland) Edinburgh (2 BP)	Stadio Sergio Lanfranchi, Parma
15:05	Try: D. Bartolomeo 3' c Pitinari 12' c Gesi 34' c Fusco 44' c Con: Da Re (4/4) 4', 13', 35', 45'; Pen: Roger (1/1) 79'; Cards: Licata (red card) 15'; Pitinari (yellow card) 74'	Report; Highlights	Try: McConnell 17' c Bradbury 23' c Velacott 50' c Harrison 75' c Con: Healy (4/4) 18', 24', 51', 76'	Attendance: 2,276; Referee: Ben Whitehouse (Wales)

27 September 2025	Scarlets (Wales)	21–34	(Ireland) Munster (1 BP)	Parc y Scarlets, Llanelli
17:30	Try: Murray 48' c Mee 64' c Plumtree 75' c Con: Costelow (2/2) 49', 65'; Hawkins (1/1) 76'	Report; Highlights	Try: Casey 10' c Haley 42' c D. Kelly 59' c Ahern 69' c Con: Hanrahan (1/1) 12'; Crowley (3/3) 43', 60', 70'; Pen: Hanrahan (2/2) 23', 29'	Attendance: 9,078; Referee: Sam Grove-White (Scotland)

27 September 2025	(1 BP) Cardiff (Wales)	33–20	(South Africa) Lions	Cardiff Arms Park
19:45	Try: Thomas 9' c Winnet 23' c Mann 52' c Lloyd 60' c, 76' m Con: Sheedy (4/5) 10', 24', 53', 61'; Cards: Thomas (red card) 30'	Report; Highlights	Try: Venter 27' c Steenkamp 48' c Con: Dobela (2/2) 28', 49'; Pen: Dobela (2/2) 17', 37'	Attendance: 5,711; Referee: Filippo Russo (Italy)

27 September 2025	(1 BP) Connacht (Ireland)	26–15	(Italy) Benetton	The Sportsground, Galway
19:45	Try: Ioane 8' c Naughton 19' m Tierney-Martin 46' c Jansen 73' c Con: Forde (3/4) 9', 47', 74'; Cards: Mullins (yellow card) 26'	Report; Highlights	Try: Louis Lynagh 41' m Garbisi 80+1' c Con: Umaga (1/2) 80+2'; Pen: Umaga (1/1) 16'; Cards: Fekitoa (yellow card) 8'; Lamaro (yellow card) 44'	Attendance: 3,928; Referee: Christopher Allison (South Africa)

=== Round 2 ===
3 October 2025	Stormers (South Africa)	26–10	(Wales) Ospreys	Cape Town Stadium
18:00	Try: Roos 10' m Simelane 58' c De Villiers 70' m Con: Matthee 59'; Pen: Matthee (3) 41', 44', 57'	Report; Highlights	Try: Hardy (2) 3' m, 29' m	Attendance: 13,668; Referee: Peter Martin (Ireland)

3 October 2025	Dragons (Wales)	17–17	(South Africa) Sharks	Rodney Parade, Newport
20:05	Try: Wainwright 15' c O'Brien 26' c Con: De Beer (2) 16', 27'; Pen: De Beer 66'; Cards: Coleman (yellow card) 73'	Report; Highlights	Try: Orie 8' c V. Tshituka 38' c Con: Smith (2) 9', 39'; Pen: Smith 19'	Attendance: 4,889; Referee: Filippo Russo (Italy)

4 October 2025	Benetton (Italy)	16–14	(Scotland) Glasgow Warriors (1 BP)	Stadio Comunale di Monigo, Treviso
17:30	Try: Menoncello 51' c Con: Umaga 53'; Pen: Umaga (2) 26', 71'; Drop: R. Smith 80+1'; Cards: Cannone (yellow card) 67'	Report; Highlights	Try: Oguntibeju 19' c McKay 29' c Con: A. Hastings (2) 20', 30'	Attendance: 4,806; Referee: Ben Connor (Wales)

4 October 2025	(1 BP) Bulls (South Africa)	39–31	(Ireland) Leinster (1 BP)	Loftus Versfeld Stadium, Pretoria
17:30	Try: De Klerk 4' c Kriel (2) 16' m, 78' c Gumede 41' c Le Roux 58' m Jacobs 68' m Con: Johannes (2) 5', 42'; Kriel 79'; Pen: Johannes 35'	Report; Highlights	Try: Clarkson 30' c Cooney 44' c T. O'Brien 46' c Penny 66' c Con: Prendergast (4) 31', 45', 47', 66'; Pen: Prendergast 20'; Cards: Connors (yellow card) 21'	Attendance: 6,937; Referee: Adam Jones (Wales)

4 October 2025	Munster (Ireland)	23–20	(Wales) Cardiff (1 BP)	Thomond Park, Limerick
19:45	Try: Quinn 29' m Coombes 52' c Barron 61' m Con: Crowley 53'; Pen: Crowley 67'; Drop: Crowley 77'	Report; Highlights	Try: J. Adams 15' m Bowen (3) 44' m, 57' m, 80+2' m	Attendance: 12,066; Referee: Griffin Colby (South Africa)

5 October 2025	Zebre (Italy)	22–20	(South Africa) Lions (1 BP)	Stadio Sergio Lanfranchi, Parma
14:00	Try: Stavile 12' m Di Bartolomeo 35' c Nocera 79' c Con: Da Re 36'; Roger 80'; Pen: Roger 64'	Report; Highlights	Try: Kotze 52' m Keyter 56' m Brandon 74' c Con: Dobela 75'; Pen: C. Smith 17'	Attendance: 2,175; Referee: Craig Evans (Wales)

13 March 2026	(1 BP) Connacht (Ireland)	31–14	(Wales) Scarlets	The Sportsground, Galway
19:45	Try: Jansen (2) 16' c, 37' m Aungier 46' c Barrett 57' m De Buitlear 69' c Con: Naughton (3) 17', 47', 70'	Report; Highlights	Try: Roberts 49' c Jones 53' c Con: Leggatt-Jones (2/2) 50', 54'	Attendance: 5,649; Referee: Ruairidh Campbell (Scotland)

13 March 2026	Edinburgh (Scotland)	19–40	(Ireland) Ulster (1 BP)	Edinburgh Rugby Stadium
19:45	Try: Thompson 6' c Paterson 21' c Goosen 31' m Con: Thompson (2/3) 6', 22'; Cards: Morris (red card)	Report; Highlights	Try: Irvine 10' c Augustus 35' c Flannery 50' m Wilson 62' c McKee 69' c Carson 74' c Con: Murphy (5/6) 11', 35', 63', 70', 75'; Cards: Sheridan (red card); Z. Ward (yellow card) 1'	Attendance: 7,989; Referee: Federico Vedovelli (Italy)

=== Round 3 ===
10 October 2025	(1 BP) Munster (Ireland)	20–19	(Scotland) Edinburgh (1 BP)	Musgrave Park, Cork
19:45	Try: A. Smith 2'; Milne (2) 33', 58'; F. Wycherley 72'	Report; Highlights	Try: Ashman 7'; Vellacott 15'; Graham 48'; Con: Healy (2) 16', 49'; Cards: Young (yellow card) 28'; Rae (yellow card) 30'; Douglas (yellow card) 53'; Graham (yellow card) 68'	Attendance: 8,800; Referee: Ben Whitehouse (Wales)

10 October 2025	Scarlets (Wales)	0–34	(South Africa) Stormers (1 BP)	Parc y Scarlets, Llanelli
19:45	Cards: Plumtree (yellow card) 33'; Page (yellow card) 72'	Report; Highlights	Try: Roos 11'; De Villiers 40'; Van Heerden 57'; Feinberg-Mngomezulu 65'; Khan 74'; Con: Feinberg-Mngomezulu (2) 12', 40+1'; Willemse 58'; Pen: Feinberg-Mngomezulu 17'; Cards: Dixon (yellow card) 28'; Feinberg-Mngomezulu (yellow card) 53'	Attendance: 6,114; Referee: Federico Vedovelli (Italy)

11 October 2025	(1 BP) Benetton (Italy)	41–15	(South Africa) Lions	Stadio Comunale di Monigo, Treviso
15:00	Try: R. Smith 8'; Lynagh (4) 14', 30', 71', 80+3'; Ferrari 20'; Con: Umaga (3) 21', 31', 72'; R. Smith 80+4'; Pen: Umaga 42'; Cards: Gallo (yellow card) 53'; Avaca (yellow card) 80'	Report; Highlights	Try: Ntlabakanye 27'; Van Vuuren 78'; Con: C. Smith 28'; Pen: C. Smith 2'; Cards: Jonker (yellow card) 69'; Horn (yellow card) 80+2'	Attendance: 4,850; Referee: Andrew Brace (Ireland)

11 October 2025	Ospreys (Wales)	24–0	(Italy) Zebre	Brewery Field, Bridgend
15:00	Try: Cokanasiga 15'; Morse 18'; Ratti 74'; Con: Edwards (3) 16', 18', 75'; Pen: D. Edwards 59'	Report; Highlights		Attendance: 4,519; Referee: Eoghan Cross (Ireland)

11 October 2025	(1 BP) Glasgow Warriors (Scotland)	49–0	(Wales) Dragons	Scotstoun Stadium, Glasgow
17:30	Try: Steyn 10'; Horne (2) 25', 62'; Brown 43'; Hiddleston 47'; Matthews 67'; Con: Hastings (4) 11', 26', 43', 48'; Horne 62'; Lancaster 68'	Report; Highlights	Cards: Dyer (yellow card) 80+2'	Attendance: 5,800; Referee: Peter Martin (Ireland)

11 October 2025	(1 BP) Leinster (Ireland)	31–5	(South Africa) Sharks	Aviva Stadium, Dublin
17:30	Try: Jamie Osborne 12'; Jimmy O'Brien 23'; Van der Flier 27'; Deegan 49'; Gus McCarthy 71'; Con: Harry Byrne (3) 13', 23', 28'; Cards: Boyle (yellow card) 74'	Report; Highlights	Try: Hooker 30'	Attendance: 17,549; Referee: Craig Evans (Wales)

11 October 2025	(1 BP) Ulster (Ireland)	28–7	(South Africa) Bulls	Ravenhill Stadium, Belfast
19:45	Try: McCloskey 22'; Augustus 49'; Herring 54'; Izuchukwu 57'; Con: Doak (4) 22', 50', 55', 58'; Cards: Herring (yellow card) 27'	Report; Highlights	Try: Louw 27'; Con: Pollard 28'; Cards: Rudolph (yellow card) 47'	Attendance: 10,629; Referee: Mike Adamson (Scotland)

11 October 2025	Cardiff (Wales)	14–8	(Ireland) Connacht (1 BP)	Cardiff Arms Park
19:45	Try: Bowen (2) 14', 75'; Con: Sheedy 15'; Lloyd 76'	Report	Try: O'Connor 80+2'; Pen: Forde 11'	Attendance: 7,092; Referee: Gianluca Gnecchi (Italy)

=== Round 4 ===
17 October 2025	(1 BP) Edinburgh	43–0	Benetton	Edinburgh Rugby Stadium
19:45	Try: Van der Merwe 5'; Richardson (2) 11', 57'; Graham (2) 39', 78'; O'Conor 65'; Bradbury 73'; Con: Scott (3) 6', 11', 40'; Thompson 66'	Report; Highlights	Cards: Fekitoa (yellow card) 44'; Garbisi (yellow card) 57'	Attendance: 6,763; Referee: Ben Breakspear (Wales)

17 October 2025	(1 BP) Connacht	27–28	Bulls	The Sportsground, Galway
19:45	Try: Ioane 10'; Blade 45'; Naughton 68'; Hansen 79'; Con: Ioane (2) 11', 46'; Pen: Naughton 74'; Cards: Murphy (red card) 19'	Report; Highlights	Try: De Wet (2) 13', 54'; Le Roux 20'; Con: Johannes (2) 21', 55'; Pen: Johannes (2) 63', 72'; Drop: Johannes 43'	Attendance: 3,928; Referee: Mike Adamson (Scotland)

17 October 2025	(1 BP) Dragons	17–24	Cardiff (1 BP)	Rodney Parade, Newport
19:45	Try: Coghlan 7'; Carter 72'; Con: De Beer (2) 8', 73'; Pen: O'Brien 80'	Report; Highlights	Try: Mann 2'; Faletau 14'; Dan Thomas 20'; Southworth 61'; Con: Sheedy 14'; Ben Thomas 62'	Attendance: 7,483; Referee: Federico Vedovelli (Italy)

18 October 2025	(1 BP) Lions	29–18	Scarlets	Ellis Park Stadium, Johannesburg
12:45	Try: Horn 25'; Marais 58'; Brandon (2) 70', 74'; Pen: C. Smith 47'; Lombard (2) 53', 80+1'; Cards: Landsberg (yellow card) 38'	Report; Highlights	Try: Penalty try 68'; Roberts 77'; Pen: Costelow (2) 12', 50'	Attendance: 1,771; Referee: Eoghan Cross (Ireland)

18 October 2025	(1 BP) Sharks	26–34	Ulster (1 BP)	Kings Park Stadium, Durban
15:00	Try: Kolisi 33'; Mapimpi 49'; Penalty try 63'; Esterhuizen 71'; Con: Masuku 50'; Hendrikse 72'; Cards: Mapimpi (red card); Koch (yellow card) 51'	Report; Highlights	Try: Lowry 6'; Werner Kok 21'; Stewart 56'; Reid 66'; Con: Doak (4) 7', 21', 57', 68'; Pen: Doak (2) 16', 37'; Cards: O'Toole (yellow card) 61'	Attendance: 11,280; Referee: Ben Whitehouse (Wales)

18 October 2025	Leinster	14–31	Munster (1 BP)	Croke Park, Dublin
17:15	Try: Kelleher 7'; Penny 79'; Con: Prendergast (2) 8', 80+1'; Cards: Frawley (yellow card) 77'	Report; Highlights	Try: Gleeson 17'; Tom Farrell 23'; Coughlan 37'; Penalty try 76'; Con: Crowley (3) 18', 24', 38'; Pen: Crowley 49'; Cards: Coombes (yellow card) 79'	Attendance: 51,859; Referee: Gianluca Gnecchi (Italy)

18 October 2025	Zebre	13–31	Stormers (1 BP)	Stadio Sergio Lanfranchi, Parma
19:45	Try: Belloni 20'; Con: Da Re 21'; Pen: Da Re (2) 63', 67'; Cards: Nocero (yellow card) 59'	Report	Try: De Villiers 6'; Feinberg-Mngomezulu (2) 37', 46'; Gelant 58'; Nel 80'; Con: Feinberg-Mngomezulu (3) 38', 58', 80+1'	Attendance: 2,176; Referee: Andrew Brace (Ireland)

18 October 2025	Ospreys	17–42	Glasgow Warriors (1 BP)	Brewery Field, Bridgend
19:45	Try: Morgan-williams 13'; Morgan 45'; Con: Edwards (2) 14', 46'; Pen: Edwards 24'; Cards: Lake (yellow card) 29'	Report	Try: Dobie (2) 9', 50'; Steyn 16'; Matthews 40+1'; Ferrie 62'; Duncan 76'; Con: A. Hastings (5) 9', 17', 40+2', 51', 63'; Lancaster 77'	Attendance: 4,861; Referee: Andrea Piardi (Italy)

=== Round 5 ===
24 October 2025	Glasgow Warriors (Scotland)	21–12	(South Africa) Bulls	Scotstoun Stadium, Glasgow
19:45	Try: Tuipulotu 5' c Penalty try 65'; McBeth 70' c Con: Hastings (2) 6', 71'; Cards: McBeth (yellow card) 53'	Report; Highlights	Try: Jacobs 11' m Le Roux 49' c Con: Johannes 49'; Cards: Klopper (yellow card) 65'	Attendance: 6,848; Referee: Craig Evans (Wales)

25 October 2025	(1 BP) Lions (South Africa)	49–31	(Ireland) Ulster (1 BP)	Ellis Park Stadium, Johannesburg
12:45	Try: Kotze 2' c Keyter 8' c Venter 46' c du Plessis 61' c Van Wyk 71' m Van Vuuren 76' m Brandon 80+1' m Con: C. Smith (4) 3', 9', 47', 62'; Pen: C. Smith (2) 33', 50'; Cards: Ntlabakanye (yellow card) 27'	Report; Highlights	Try: Baloucoune (3) 5' c, 40' m, 52' m Hume 24' c McCann 67' c Con: Doak (2) 6', 24'; Flannery 67'	Attendance: 4,061; Referee: Ben Connor (Wales)

25 October 2025	(1 BP) Sharks (South Africa)	29–19	(Wales) Scarlets	Kings Park Stadium, Durban
15:00	Try: V. Tshituka 5' m E. Tshituka 19' c Mazibuko 28' c Kolisi 49' c Con: Jean Smith (3) 20', 29', 50'; Pen: Jean Smith 64'	Report; Highlights	Try: Van der Merwe 16' c Murray 21' c Rogers 45' m Con: Costelow (2) 17', 22'; Cards: Plumtree (yellow card) 72'	Attendance: 9,528; Referee: Sam Grove-White (Scotland)

25 October 2025	(1 BP) Leinster (Ireland)	50–26	(Italy) Zebre (1 BP)	Aviva Stadium, Dublin
17:30	Try: Kenny (2) 2' c, 27' c Soroka (2) 7' m, 12' c Cahir 48' c Byrne 55' m Snyman 68' c Connors 78' m Con: Byrne (5) 2', 13', 27', 49', 69'; Cards: A. Osborne (red card) 30'	Report; Highlights	Try: Belloni 10' c Dominguez 20' c Quattrini 32' c Marco Zanon 73' m Con: Da Re (3) 11', 21', 33'; Cards: Dominguez (red card) 37'	Attendance: 14,128; Referee: Ian Kenny (Scotland)

25 October 2025	Benetton (Italy)	16–31	(South Africa) Stormers	Stadio Comunale di Monigo, Treviso
17:30	Try: Lynagh 30' c Con: Umaga 31'; Pen: Umaga (3) 15', 18', 35'	Report; Highlights	Try: Sandi 6' m Matthee 48' c Porthen 80' c Con: Matthee (2) 49', 80+1'; Pen: Matthee (4) 20', 45', 53', 72'	Attendance: 4,903; Referee: Hollie Davidson (Scotland)

25 October 2025	Dragons (Wales)	19–19	(Wales) Ospreys	Rodney Parade, Newport
17:30	Try: R. Williams 38' c Coghlan 60' c Burrows 76' m Con: De Beer (2) 40', 61'	Report; Highlights	Try: Deaves 15' m Cokanasiga 20' c Hopkins 46' c Con: Edwards (2) 20', 47'; Cards: Kasende (yellow card) 80'	Attendance: 5,511; Referee: Ben Breakspear (Wales)

25 October 2025	Munster (Ireland)	17–15	(Ireland) Connacht (1 BP)	Thomond Park, Limerick
19:45	Try: O'Donoghue (2) 15' m, 67' m Kilgallen 33' c Con: JJ Hanrahan 33'	Report; Highlights	Try: Ralston (2) 20' m, 28' m Boyle 42' m	Attendance: 16,512; Referee: Andrea Piardi (Italy)

25 October 2025	Cardiff (Wales)	20–19	(Scotland) Edinburgh (1 BP)	Cardiff Arms Park
19:45	Try: Mulder 7' m Adams 15' c Sebastian 43' m Con: Lloyd 16'; Pen: Lloyd 74'	Report; Highlights	Try: Wells 3' m Shiel 9' c Ashman 19' c Con: Scott 9'; Lang 20'	Attendance: 7,189; Referee: Andrew Brace (Ireland)

=== Round 6 ===
28 November 2025	(1 BP) Ulster (Ireland)	47–13	(Italy) Benetton	Ravenhill Stadium, Belfast
19:45	Try: Baloucoune (2) 10' m, 77' c Kok (2) 21' c, 58' c Hume 52' c Penalty try 63'; Sheridan 68' c Con: Doak (3) 22', 53', 59'; Flannery (2) 68', 78'	Report	Try: Bernasconi 28' c Con: Umaga 29'; Pen: Umaga (2) 15', 43'; Cards: Ratave (yellow card) 63'	Attendance: 11,517; Referee: Sam Grove-White (Scotland)

28 November 2025	Dragons (Wales)	10–24	(Ireland) Leinster (1 BP)	Rodney Parade, Newport
19:45	Try: Screech 31' c Con: De Beer 32'; Pen: O'Brien 47'	Report	Try: Soroka 4' m Kenny (2) 44' c, 59' m Snyman 78' c Con: Byrne (2) 45', 79'; Cards: Mangan (yellow card) 29'; Penny (yellow card) 38'; McGrath (yellow card) 80'	Attendance: 4,244; Referee: Morne Ferreira (South Africa)

29 November 2025	(1 BP) Bulls (South Africa)	33–43	(South Africa) Lions (1 BP)	Loftus Versfeld Stadium, Pretoria
12:00	Try: Papier (2) 30' c, 33' c A. van der Merwe 40' m Johannes 76' c De Klerk 78' c Con: Johannes (4/5) 31', 34', 76', 78'	Report	Try: Mpeku 18' c Steyn (2) 23' c, 74' c Cairns 37' m E. Oosthuizen 52' c Keyter 72' c Con: C. Smith (5/6) 19', 24', 53', 73', 75'; Pen: C. Smith 11'	Attendance: 14,122; Referee: Aimee Barrett-Theron (South Africa)

29 November 2025	Zebre (Italy)	14–29	(Wales) Cardiff (1 BP)	Stadio Sergio Lanfranchi, Parma
13:00	Try: Licata 30' c Zanon 74' c Con: Roger (2/2) 31', 74'; Cards: Licata (yellow card) 16'; Ruggeri (yellow card) 49'; Zanon (yellow card) 80+2'	Report	Try: Hughes (3) 13' c, 18' m, 40' c Basham 80+3' c Con: Lloyd (2/3) 19', 41'; Wilde (1/1) 80+4'; Pen: Lloyd 48'; Cards: Basham (yellow card) 69'	Attendance: 2,392; Referee: Marius van der Westhuizen (South Africa)

29 November 2025	(1 BP) Munster (Ireland)	21–27	(South Africa) Stormers	Thomond Park, Limerick
17:30	Try: Beirne 8' c Hodnett 20'; Crowley 27'; Con: Crowley (3/3) 8', 20', 28'; Cards: Coombes (yellow card) 58'	Report	Try: A. Smith 58'; Maart 68'; Nel 72'; Con: Matthee (3/3) 59' c, 69' c, 72' c Pen: Matthee (2) 6', 12'; Cards: Evans (yellow card) 3'; Theunissen (yellow card) 20'	Attendance: 14,421; Referee: Andrea Piardi (Italy)

29 November 2025	Edinburgh (Scotland)	19–17	(Wales) Ospreys (1 BP)	Edinburgh Rugby Stadium
17:30	Try: Currie 33' m Morris 54' c Paterson 71' c Con: Thompson (1/2) 55'; Scott (1/1) 71'	Report	Try: Davies 25' m Cokanasiga 45' m Boshoff 75' c Con: Walsh 76'	Attendance: 6,502; Referee: Peter Martin (Ireland)

29 November 2025	(1 BP) Connacht (Ireland)	44–17	(South Africa) Sharks	The Sportsground, Galway
19:45	Try: Boyle 17' c Mullins 31' c Gavin 58' c Devine 72' c Illo 79' c Con: Naughton (5) 19', 32', 58', 73', 80'; Pen: Naughton (3) 8', 27', 42'	Report	Try: Mbatha 15' m Mapimpi 66' m Van Heerden 75' c Con: Jordan Hendrikse 75'; Cards: Jenkins (yellow card) 28'	Attendance: 3,928; Referee: Ben Whitehouse (Wales)

29 November 2025	Scarlets (Wales)	23–0	(Scotland) Glasgow Warriors	Parc y Scarlets, Llanelli
19:45	Try: MacLeod 16' c Page 49' c Con: Costelow (2/2) (2) 17', 50'; Pen: Costelow (3) 25', 31', 67'; Cards: Cuckson (yellow card) 71'	Report		Attendance: 5,444; Referee: Christopher Allison (South Africa)

=== Round 7 ===
19 December 2025	(1 BP) Cardiff (Wales)	17–21	(Wales) Scarlets	Cardiff Arms Park
19:45	Try: Grady 29' c Adams 54' c Con: Sheedy (2) 30', 55'; Pen: Sheedy 41'	Report	Try: James 23' c Davies (2) 51' c, 57' c Con: Hawkins (3) 24', 52', 58'; Cards: Macleod (yellow card) 25'; Davies (yellow card) 28'; Williams (yellow card) 60'	Attendance: 11,278; Referee: Ben Breakspear (Wales)

19 December 2025	(1 BP) Leinster (Ireland)	24–20	(Ireland) Ulster (1 BP)	Aviva Stadium, Dublin
19:45	Try: Ioane 27' c Kenny 54' m Lowe 66' m Sheehan 74' c Con: Prendergast 27'; Byrne 75'; Cards: Ryan (yellow card) 59'	Report	Try: Kok (2) 14' m, 34' c Stewart 38' m Con: Doak 35'; Pen: Doak 62'; Cards: McCann (yellow card) 72'	Attendance: 20,013; Referee: Andrew Brace (Ireland)

20 December 2025	(1 BP) Stormers (South Africa)	34–27	(South Africa) Lions (1 BP)	Cape Town Stadium
13:30	Try: Maart 27' c Simelane 42' c De Villiers 53' c Roos 64' c Con: Matthee (4/4) (4) 28', 42', 54', 65'; Pen: Matthee (2/2) (2) 38', 60'	Report	Try: Venter (2) 1' c, 40' c Mpeku 69' c Con: C. Smith (3/3) (3) 2', 40+1', 70'; Pen: C. Smith (2/2) (2) 19', 57'	Attendance: 28,205; Referee: Hanru Van Rooyen (South Africa)

20 December 2025	Benetton (Italy)	21–15	(Italy) Zebre (1 BP)	Stadio Comunale di Monigo, Treviso
14:00	Try: Mendy 26' c Gasperini 65' m Con: Umaga 26'; Pen: Umaga (3) 17', 30', 46'; Cards: Menoncello (yellow card) 51'	Report	Try: Ferrari 52' m Gesi 68' c Con: Montemauri 69'; Pen: Montemauri 38'	Attendance: 5,000; Referee: Gianluca Gnecchi (Italy)

20 December 2025	(1 BP) Glasgow Warriors (Scotland)	24–12	(Scotland) Edinburgh	Hampden Park, Glasgow
15:00	Try: Fagerson 10' c Darge 51' c Hiddleston 55' m Stephen 77' m Con: Hastngs (2) 11', 51'	Report	Try: Richardson 28' m Gilchrist 72' c Con: Thompson 72'; Cards: Hunter-Hill (yellow card) 77'	Attendance: 21,093; Referee: Eoghan Cross (Ireland)

20 December 2025	Sharks (South Africa)	21–12	(South Africa) Bulls	Kings Park Stadium, Durban
16:00	Try: Kunene 15' c Kolisi 71' c Van der Merwe 77' c Con: Hendrikse 16'; Whitehead (2) 72', 78'	Report	Pen: Pollard (4) 19', 24', 38', 57'; Cards: Kriel (yellow card) 29'	Attendance: 44,517; Referee: Griffin Colby (South Africa)

20 December 2025	Ospreys (Wales)	10–26	(Ireland) Munster (1 BP)	Brewery Field, Bridgend
17:30	Try: Morris 54' c Con: Edwards 55'; Pen: Edwards 11'; Cards: Nagy (yellow card) 15'	Report	Try: Daly 17' m Baron 36' c Crowley 40+1' c Haley 48' c Con: Crowley (3/4) 37', 40+1', 49; Cards: O'Donoghue (yellow card) 54'	Attendance: 4,715; Referee: Sam Grove-White (Scotland)

20 December 2025	(1 BP) Dragons (Wales)	48–28	(Ireland) Connacht (1 BP)	Rodney Parade, Newport
19:45	Try: Burrows 17' c Hope (2) 25' c, 61' c Rosser 32' c Penalty try 40+4'; Dyer 51' c Con: O'Brien (5/5) 18', 26', 33', 52', 62'; Pen: O'Brien (2/2) 43', 46'	Report	Try: Gilbert 10' c Prendergast (2) 66' c, 74' c Jansen 80+2' c Con: Gilbert (4) 11', 67', 74', 80+3'; Cards: Boyle (yellow card) 40+5'	Attendance: 4,188; Referee: Ruairidh Campbell (Scotland)

=== Round 8 ===
26 December 2025	Cardiff (Wales)	22–19	(Wales) Dragons (1 BP)	Cardiff Arms Park
15:00	Try: Sebastian 20' c Mann 30' m J. Adams 47' c Con: Sheedy (2) 21', 48'; Pen: Sheedy 70'; Cards: McNally (yellow card) 78'	Report	Try: Hope (2) 7' m, 32' c Penalty try 78'; Con: O'Brien 32'; Cards: Keddie (yellow card) 57'	Attendance: 12,125; Referee: Adam Jones (Wales)

26 December 2025	(1 BP) Scarlets (Wales)	19–26	(Wales) Ospreys (1 BP)	Parc y Scarlets, Llanelli
17:30	Try: Roberts (2) 35' c, 69' m Taylor 80' c Con: Hawkins (2) 35', 80'; Cards: Douglas (yellow card) 75'	Report	Try: Watkin 24' c Lake 29' c Hardy 63' c Hopkins 77' m Con: Edwards (3) 25', 30', 64'; Cards: Williams (yellow card) 18'; Giles (yellow card) 64'	Attendance: 12,105; Referee: Ben Whitehouse (Wales)

27 December 2025	Zebre (Italy)	23–37	(Italy) Benetton (1 BP)	Stadio Sergio Lanfranchi, Parma
14:30	Try: Gesi 43' c Faissal 79' c Con: Da Re 44'; Dominguez 80'; Pen: Da Re (3) 8', 13', 31'; Cards: Ferrari (yellow card) 7'; Mazza (yellow card) 53'	Report	Try: Mendy 2' c Penalty try 53'; Odogwu 62' c Werchon 70' c Con: Umaga (3) 3', 63', 71'; Pen: Umaga (3) 7', 18', 40+1'; Cards: Lamaro (yellow card) 25'	Attendance: 4,500; Referee: Clara Munarini (Italy)

27 December 2025	Edinburgh (Scotland)	3–21	(Scotland) Glasgow Warriors	Murrayfield Stadium, Edinburgh
15:00	Pen: Scott 6'	Report	Try: Dobie (2) 32' c, 79' c Horne 76' c Con: Adam Hastings 33'; Horne 77'; Lancaster 80'; Cards: Fraser (yellow card) 21'	Attendance: 38,179; Referee: Hollie Davidson (Scotland)

27 December 2025	(1 BP) Connacht (Ireland)	24–29	(Ireland) Ulster (1 BP)	The Sportsground, Galway
17:30	Try: Treacy 24' c Jansen 66' c Devine 77' c Con: Gilbert (3) 25', 67', 77'; Pen: Gilbert 31'; Cards: Aki (yellow card) 43'; Joyce (yellow card) 51'	Report	Try: Zac Ward (2) 34' c, 41' m Kok 47' c Penalty try 53'; Con: Jack Murphy (2/3) 34', 48'; Cards: Jack Murphy (yellow card) 16'; McCloskey (yellow card) 43'	Attendance: 3,928; Referee: Eoghan Cross (Ireland)

27 December 2025	(1 BP) Munster (Ireland)	8–13	(Ireland) Leinster	Thomond Park, Limerick
19:45	Try: Kelly 70' m Pen: Crowley 55'	Report	Try: Van der Flier 6' c Con: Byrne 7'; Pen: Byrne (2) 53', 59'	Attendance: 26,006; Referee: Peter Martin (Ireland)

21 February 2026	(1 BP) Lions (South Africa)	34–22	(South Africa) Sharks	Ellis Park Stadium, Johannesburg
12:00	Try: Ntlabakanye 30' c Van den Berg 33' c Mahashe 44' c Venter 52' c Con: C. Smith (4/4) 31', 34', 45', 53'; Pen: C. Smith (2/2) 4', 19'; Cards: Mills (yellow card) 40'; Marais (yellow card) 65'	Report	Try: Mbatha 15' c Tino Masere 48' m Julius 80+1' c Con: Masuku (1/2) 16'; Jo Hendrikse (1/1) 80+2'; Pen: Masuku 40+1; Cards: Ja Hendrikse (yellow card) 29'	Attendance: 7,841; Referee: Griffin Colby (South Africa)

14 March 2026	Bulls (South Africa)	19–32	(South Africa) Stormers (1BP)	Loftus Versfeld Stadium, Pretoria
12:00	Try: Penalty try 19'; Burger 67' c Arendse 79' m Con: Pollard (1/2) 68'; Cards: Wiese (yellow card) 64'; Van Staden (yellow card) 66'	Report	Try: Willemse 31' c De Villiers 57' m Penalty try 66'; Daymani 70' c Con: Feinberg-Mngomezulu (2/3) 31', 70'; Pen: Feinberg-Mngomezulu (2/4) 40', 51'; Cards: A. Smith (yellow card) 14'; Dixon (yellow card) 19'	Attendance: 33,280; Referee: Marius van der Westhuizen (South Africa)

=== Round 9 ===
1 January 2026	(1 BP) Dragons (Wales)	28–5	(Wales) Scarlets	Rodney Parade, Newport
15:00	Try: De Beer 8' c Burrows 43' c Richards 48' c Roberts 75'; Con: O'Brien (4/4) 9', 44', 49', 76'	Report	Try: Mee 35' m Cards: Cuckson (yellow card) 23'; Douglas (red card) 42'	Attendance: 8,369; Referee: Ben Connor (Wales)

1 January 2026	(1 BP) Ospreys (Wales)	33–22	(Wales) Cardiff (1 BP)	Brewery Field, Bridgend
17:30	Try: Giles 14' c Hardy (2) 25' m, 51' c Parry 42' c Hopkins 69' c Con: Edwards (4/5) 15', 43', 51', 70'; Cards: Morse (yellow card) 80'	Report	Try: Adams (2) 22' c, 74' m Faletau 76' m Sebastian 80+1' m Con: Sheedy (1/3) 23'; Cards: Belcher (yellow card) 31'	Attendance: 7,700; Referee: Adam Jones (Wales)

2 January 2026	Ulster (Ireland)	28–3	(Ireland) Munster	Ravenhill Stadium, Belfast
19:45	Try: Stewart 48' c Flannery 55' m B. Ward 72' c Con: Doak (2) 49', 72'; Pen: Doak (3) 5', 25', 43'	Report	Pen: Hanrahan 28'	Attendance: 18,196; Referee: Mike Adamson (Scotland)

3 January 2026	(2 BP) Sharks (South Africa)	22–23	(South Africa) Lions	Kings Park Stadium, Durban
13:30	Try: E. Tshituka 15' m Kolisi 25' c Jenkins 39' m Van der Merwe 58' m Con: Jo. Hendrikse (1/4) 26'	Report	Try: Oosthuizen 7' c F. Horn 10' m Pead 80+1' m Con: Smith (1/3) 8'; Pen: Smith (2/2) 4', 32'; Cards: Venter (yellow card) 39'	Attendance: 20,622; Referee: Christopher Allison (South Africa)

3 January 2026	Stormers (South Africa)	13–8	(South Africa) Bulls (1 BP)	Cape Town Stadium
16:00	Try: Roos 39' m Mchunu 79' m Pen: Feinberg-Mngomezulu 35'	Report	Try: Pollard 31'; Pen: Pollard 44'; Cards: Le Roux (yellow card) 35'	Attendance: 53,862; Referee: Griffin Colby (South Africa)

3 January 2026	(1 BP) Benetton (Italy)	14–15	(Scotland) Edinburgh	Stadio Comunale di Monigo, Treviso
17:30	Try: Gallo 52' c Fekitoa 57' c Con: Umaga (2/2) 53', 58'	Report	Try: Vellacott 21' c Graham 48' m Con: Thompson (1/2) 22'; Pen: Thompson 29'	Attendance: 4,857; Referee: Peter Martin (Ireland)

3 January 2026	(1 BP) Leinster (Ireland)	52–17	(Ireland) Connacht	Aviva Stadium, Dublin
17:30	Try: Sheehan 4' c Tector (2) 8' c, 62' c Prendergast 39' m Deeny 44' c O'Brien (2) 52' c, 67' c Kenny 75'; Con: Prendergast (6/8) 5', 8', 45', 52', 63', 67'; Cards: Joe McCarthy (yellow card) 26'	Report	Try: Tierney-Martin 19' c Bealham 36' c Con: Gilbert (2/2) 20', 37'; Pen: Gilbert 28'	Attendance: 21,422; Referee: Andrew Brace (Ireland)

3 January 2026	(1 BP) Glasgow Warriors (Scotland)	47–10	(Italy) Zebre	Scotstoun Stadium, Glasgow
19:45	Try: McDowall 13' c Smith 20' c Stephen 39' m Dobie 59' c, 78' c Hiddleston 74' c Weir 77' c Con: Hastings (2) 13', 21'; Weir (3) 60', 74', 78'; Lancaster 79'	Report	Try: Bertaccini 23' m Quattrini 48' m Cards: Reggeri (yellow card) 40'	Attendance: 6,476; Referee: Ben Breakspear (Wales)

=== Round 10 ===
23 January 2026	(1 BP) Ospreys (Wales)	24–24	(South Africa) Lions (1 BP)	Brewery Field, Bridgend
19:45	Try: Ratti 24' c Hopkins 34' m Morse 39' c Kasende 63' m Con: Edwards (2/4) 25', 39'; Cards: Lake (yellow card) 27'; Davies (yellow card) 53'	Report	Try: Francke Horn (2) 9' m, 40+4' c PJ Botha 48' m Quan Horn 59' c Con: Smith (2/4) 40+5', 59'; Cards: SJ Kotze (yellow card) 38'; Oosthuizen (yellow card) 66'	Attendance: 4,052; Referee: Federico Vedovelli (Italy)

23 January 2026	(1 BP) Edinburgh (Scotland)	17–19	(South Africa) Bulls	Edinburgh Rugby Stadium
19:45	Try: Van der Merwe 6' m Schoeman 17' m Rae 34' c Con: Thompson (1/3) 25'	Report	Try: Coetzee 12' m Grobbelaar 44' c Van Staden 70' c Con: Pollard (2/3) 45', 71'	Attendance: 6,648; Referee: Gianluca Gnecchi (Italy)

23 January 2026	Munster (Ireland)	22–20	(Wales) Dragons (1 BP)	Musgrave Park, Cork
19:45	Try: Gleeson 39' c Coombes (2) 57' m, 65' c Con: Butler (2/3) 40', 66'; Pen: Butler 75'	Report	Try: Coghlan 17' c Richards 53' c Con: O'Brien (2/2) 18', 54'; Pen: O'Brien (2) 11', 30'; Cards: Beddall (yellow card) 19'	Attendance: 8,422; Referee: Hollie Davidson (Scotland)

24 January 2026	Scarlets (Wales)	27–22	(Ireland) Ulster (1 BP)	Parc y Scarlets, Llanelli
15:00	Try: Murray 10' c Macleod 32' c Mee 80+3' c Con: Costelow (3/3) 11', 33', 80+4'; Pen: Costelow (2) 6', 72'; Cards: Plumtree (yellow card) 67'	Report	Try: Stewart 20' m B. Ward 27' c Wilson 68' c Con: Doak (2/3) 28', 69'; Pen: Doak 76'; Cards: Kok (yellow card) 80+2'	Attendance: 6,695; Referee: Griffin Colby (South Africa)

24 January 2026	Connacht (Ireland)	23–34	(Ireland) Leinster (1 BP)	The Sportsground, Galway
17:30	Try: Tierney-Martin 12' c West 48' c Con: Gilbert (2/2) 13', 49'; Pen: Gilbert (3) 23', 33', 67'	Report	Try: Gunne 8' c RG Snyman 57' c Tector 60' c Frawley 70' c Con: Byrne (4/4) 9', 58', 61', 71'; Pen: Byrne (2) 27', 31'	Attendance: 12,481; Referee: Eoghan Cross (Ireland)

24 January 2026	Stormers (South Africa)	19–30	(South Africa) Sharks (1 BP)	Cape Town Stadium
17:30	Try: Weillemse (2) 7' m, 27' c Penalty try 78'; Con: Feinberg-Mngomezulu (1/2) 37'; Cards: Moerat (yellow card) 47'; Sandi (yellow card) 71'	Report	Try: Jenkins 5' c Williams 12' c Buthelezi 47' m Esterhuizen 73' m Con: Hendrikse (2/4) 6', 13'; Pen: Hendrikse (2) 17', 68'; Cards: V. Tshituka (yellow card) 78'	Attendance: 52,087; Referee: Aimee Barrett-Theron (South Africa)

24 January 2026	(1 BP) Zebre (Italy)	21–26	(Scotland) Glasgow Warriors (1 BP)	Stadio Sergio Lanfranchi, Parma
19:45	Try: Carrera 31' c Bertaccini 47' c Pani 69' c Con: Roger Farias (2/2) 31', 48'; Montemauri (1/1) 70'; Cards: Odiase (yellow card) 19'; Carrera (yellow card) 52'; Krumov (yellow card) 64'	Report	Try: Penalty try 18'; Hiddleston (2) 24' c, 33' c Hastings 66' m Con: Horne (2/3) 25', 34'; Cards: Hastings (yellow card) 45'	Attendance: 1,803; Referee: Robbie Jenkinson (Ireland)

24 January 2026	Cardiff (Wales)	17–8	(Italy) Benetton	Cardiff Arms Park
19:45	Try: McNally 49' m Pen: Sheedy (3) 13', 16', 60'; Lloyd 80+1'; Cards: Mann (yellow card) 26'	Report	Try: Ruzza 66' m Pen: Smith 46'	Attendance: 8,052; Referee: Sam Grove-White (Scotland)

=== Round 11 ===
30 January 2026	Benetton (Italy)	20–20	(Wales) Scarlets	Stadio Comunale di Monigo, Treviso
19:45	Try: Odogwu 37' c Garbisi 71' c Con: Smith 38'; Roger 72'; Pen: Smith (2) 25', 30'	Report	Try: Davies 42' c Lewis 57' m Page 75' m Con: Leggatt-Jones (1/3) 43'; Pen: Leggatt-Jones 15'	Attendance: 4,840; Referee: Andrew Brace (Ireland)

30 January 2026	(1 BP) Glasgow Warriors (Scotland)	31–22	(Ireland) Munster (1 BP)	Scotstoun Stadium, Glasgow
19:45	Try: Smith 7' c Lancaster 8' c Oguntibeju 33' c McKay 40' c Con: Lancaster (4/4) 8', 9', 34', 40+1'; Pen: Lancaster 74'	Report	Try: Coughlan 11' m Kelly 51' m Gleeson 61' m Kilgallen 67' c Con: Wood (1/2) 68'; Cards: Abrahams (yellow card) 39'; O'Donoghue (yellow card) 80+3'	Attendance: 7,321; Referee: Craig Evans (Wales)

31 January 2026	Lions (South Africa)	17–52	(South Africa) Bulls (1 BP)	Ellis Park Stadium, Johannesburg
12:30	Try: Van den Berg 45' c Mills 80+1' c Con: C. Smith (2) 46', 80+2'; Pen: Smith 23'	Report	Try: Vorster (2) 10' c, 55' c Grobbelaar 32' m Pollard 38' c Arendse 40' c Papier 66' c Gumede 75' m Johannes 78' c Con: Pollard (5) 11', 39', 40+1', 56', 67'; Johannes 79'; Cards: Arendse (yellow card) 16'	Attendance: 12,571; Referee: Morné Ferreira (South Africa)

31 January 2026	(1 BP) Sharks (South Africa)	36–24	(South Africa) Stormers	Kings Park Stadium, Durban
15:00	Try: Williams 12' c Hooker 25' c Esterhuizen 48' c Williams 53' c, 72' m Con: Hendrikse (4/5) 13', 26', 49', 53'; Pen: Hendrikse 69'	Report	Try: Reinach 1' m De Villiers 43' c Con: Feinberg-Mngomezulu (1/2) 44'; Pen: Feinberg-Mngomezulu (4) 16', 20', 39', 40+3'; Cards: De Villiers (yellow card) 9'; Van Heerden (yellow card) 49'	Attendance: 25,364; Referee: Christopher Allison (South Africa)

31 January 2026	Zebre (Italy)	15–31	(Ireland) Connacht (1 BP)	Stadio Sergio Lanfranchi, Parma
15:00	Try: Garcia 56' m Stavile 74' c Con: Roger Farias 75'; Pen: Roger Farias 26'; Cards: Garcia (yellow card) 60'; Zanon (yellow card) 80+10'	Report	Try: Joyce 41'; Jansen (2) 50' c, 61' c McCormack 80+11'; Con: Gilbert (4/4) 42', 51', 62', 80+12'; Pen: Gilbert 78'; Cards: Mullins (yellow card) 73'	Attendance: 2,545; Referee: Ben Whitehouse (Wales)

31 January 2026	(1 BP) Leinster (Ireland)	28–20	(Scotland) Edinburgh	Aviva Stadium, Dublin
17:30	Try: Deegan 13' c Penny (3) 44' c, 68' c, 74' c Con: Tector (4/4) 14', 45', 69', 75'	Report	Try: Van der Merwe 20' m Satala 39' c Shiel 80+1' m Con: Thompson 40'; Pen: Thompson 23'; Cards: Hunter-Hill (yellow card) 10'	Attendance: 18,505; Referee: Andrea Piardi (Italy)

31 January 2026	Ospreys (Wales)	19–13	(Wales) Dragons (1 BP)	Brewery Field, Bridgend
19:45	Try: Morgan-Williams 33' c Lloyd 74' m Giles 80' c Con: Walsh (2/3) 34', 80+1'	Report	Try: De Beer 18' c Con: O'Brien 19'; Pen: O'Brien (2) 47', 58'; Cards: Diamani (yellow card) 73'	Attendance: 5,281; Referee: Ben Connor (Wales)

31 January 2026	Ulster (Ireland)	21–14	(Wales) Cardiff (1 BP)	Ravenhill Stadium, Belfast
19:45	Try: Wilson 12' c Bell 19' c Irvine 66' c Con: Murphy (3/3) 12', 20', 67'	Report	Try: Mulder 54' c Emanuel 68' c Con: Sheedy (2/2) 55', 69'	Attendance: 12,012; Referee: Hollie Davidson (Scotland)

=== Round 12 ===
27 February 2026	(1 BP) Edinburgh (Scotland)	24–19	(Wales) Scarlets (1 BP)	Edinburgh Rugby Stadium
19:45	Try: Vellacott (2) 30' c, 49' m Bradbury 46' c Paterson 69' m Con: Thompson (2) 31', 47'; Cards: Paterson (yellow card) 56'	Report	Try: Roberts (2) 22' c, 62' m Lousi 28' c Con: Leggatt-Jones (2) 23', 28'	Attendance: 6,657; Referee: Peter Martin (Ireland)

27 February 2026	Cardiff (Wales)	8–7	(Ireland) Leinster (1 BP)	Cardiff Arms Park
19:45	Try: Davies 54' m Pen: Sheedy 19'; Cards: Beetham (yellow card) 66'	Report	Try: McGrath 68' c Con: Tector 68'; Cards: Tector (yellow card) 12'	Attendance: 7,571; Referee: Sam Grove-White (Scotland)

28 February 2026	Lions (South Africa)	24–10	(South Africa) Stormers	Ellis Park Stadium, Johannesburg
12:30	Try: Mahashe 22' c Van Wyk 26' c Cronjé 45' c Con: Smith (3/3) 23', 26', 46'; Pen: Smith 58'; Cards: Qoma (yellow card) 66'; Van Vuuren (red card) 69'	Report	Try: JD Schickerling 55' c Con: Feinberg-Mngomezulu 55'; Pen: Feinberg-Mngomezulu 43'	Attendance: 10,791; Referee: Christopher Allison (South Africa)

28 February 2026	(1 BP) Bulls (South Africa)	41–12	(South Africa) Sharks	Loftus Versfeld Stadium, Pretoria
15:00	Try: Moodie 15'; De Klerk 27'; Papier (2) 30', 37'; Vorster (2) 65', 79'; De Wet 69'; Con: Pollard (3) 31', 66', 70'	Report	Try: Van der Merwe 48'; Jacobs 62'; Con: Hendrikse 63'	Attendance: 32,672; Referee: Morné Ferreira (South Africa)

28 February 2026	Connacht (Ireland)	15–10	(Scotland) Glasgow Warriors (1 BP)	The Sportsground, Galway
15:00	Try: J. Murphy 74' c Jansen 80+1' m Con: Gilbert 75'; Pen: Gilbert 25'; Cards: Joyce (yellow card) 63'	Report	Try: Rowe (2) 62' m, 67' m	Attendance: 8,654; Referee: Ben Breakspear (Wales)

28 February 2026	Munster (Ireland)	21–7	(Italy) Zebre	Thomond Park, Limerick
17:30	Try: Daly 7' c Kendellen 65' c Barron 71' c Con: JJ Hanrahan (3/3) 8', 66', 72'	Report	Try: Stavile 32' c Con: Da Re, 33'; Cards: Bertaccini (yellow card) 3'	Attendance: 12,558; Referee: Mike Adamson (Scotland)

28 February 2026	Dragons (Wales)	15–15	(Italy) Benetton	Rodney Parade, Newport
17:30	Try: Douglas 11' c Inisi 80+1' m Con: O'Brien 12'; Pen: O'Brien 69'; Cards: Douglas (red card) 33'; Inisi (yellow card) 39'	Report	Try: Ratave (2) 2' m, 29' m Gallagher 50' m Cards: Fekitoa (yellow card) 15'	Attendance: 7,106; Referee: Eoghan Cross (Ireland)

28 February 2026	Ospreys (Wales)	21–10	(Ireland) Ulster	Brewery Field, Bridgend
19:45	Try: Foley 3' c Ratti 68' c Kasende 77' c Con: Walsh (3/3) 4', 69', 78'	Report	Try: Zac Ward 9' m Stewart 12' m Cards: Rea (yellow card) 72'	Attendance: 3,761; Referee: Filippo Russo (Italy)

=== Round 13 ===
20 March 2026	(1 BP) Bulls (South Africa)	40–7	(Wales) Cardiff	Loftus Versfeld Stadium, Pretoria
17:00	Try: Coetzee 9' c Grobbelaar 14' m Kriel 27' c Papier 35' c Louw 40' c Vermaak 57' c Con: Pollard (4/5) 10', 28', 36', 41'; Kriel (1/1) 58'	Report	Try: Millard 3' c Con: Sheedy (1/1) 4'; Cards: Lawrence (yellow card) 8'	Attendance: 6,603; Referee: Eoghan Cross (Ireland)

20 March 2026	(1 BP) Scarlets (Wales)	36–17	(Italy) Zebre	Parc y Scarlets, Llanelli
19:45	Try: Taylor (2) 2' m, 65' c Lousi 13' c Page 25' c Mee 36' m Davis 57' m Con: Leggatt-Jones (3/6) 14', 26', 66'	Report	Try: Gesi 64' m Stavile 79' m Odiase 80+3' c Con: Da Re (1/3) 80+4'	Attendance: 5,029; Referee: Peter Martin (Ireland)

20 March 2026	(1 BP) Ulster (Ireland)	19–26	(Ireland) Connacht (1 BP)	Ravenhill Stadium, Belfast
19:45	Try: Doak 24' c Zac Ward 65' m Bell 76' c Con: Doak 25'; Jack Murphy 76'	Report	Try: Jansen 19' c Bealham 57' c Treacy (2) 61' m, 68' c Con: Naughton (3/4) 20', 58', 70'; Cards: Bealham (yellow card) 38'	Attendance: 12,000; Referee: Mike Adamson (Scotland)

21 March 2026	(1 BP) Lions (South Africa)	54–17	(Scotland) Edinburgh	Ellis Park Stadium, Johannesburg
12:45	Try: Venter 6' c F. Horn 19' c Landsberg 21' c Van den Berg 26' c Mills 44' c Davids (2) 54' c, 67' c Pead 79' m Con: C. Smith (7/7) 7', 20', 22', 27', 45', 55', 69'; Mills (0/1); Cards: F. Horn (yellow card) 39'	Report	Try: Ashman 49' m Douglas 62' m Currie 72' c Con: Scott (1/3) 72'	Attendance: 3,464; Referee: Gianluca Gnecci (Italy)

21 March 2026	(1 BP) Sharks (South Africa)	45–0	(Ireland) Munster	Kings Park Stadium, Durban
15:00	Try: Buthelezi 7' c Giliomee 28' m Ganyane 51' c Van Heerden 57' c Malan 77' c Mapimpi (2) 79' c, 80+1' m Con: Hendrikse (3/4) 8', 51', 58'; J. Smith (2/3) 78', 80'	Report		Attendance: 14,539; Referee: Sam Grove-White (Scotland)

21 March 2026	(1 BP) Benetton (Italy)	31–19	(Wales) Ospreys	Stadio Comunale di Monigo, Treviso
15:00	Try: Maile 4' c Mendy 29' c Ratave (2) 46' m, 54' m Umaga 66' c Con: Umaga (3/5) 5', 30, 67; Cards: Uren (yellow card) 71'; Fekitoa (yellow card) 73'	Report	Try: K. Williams (2) 13' m, 43' c L. Davies 80' c Con: Walsh (2/3) 44', 80'; Cards: Moriarty (yellow card) 51' (red card) 64'	Attendance: 4,879; Referee: Ian Kenny (Ireland)

21 March 2026	(1 BP) Glasgow Warriors (Scotland)	38–17	(Ireland) Leinster	Scotstoun Stadium, Glasgow
17:30	Try: Duncan 27' c Hiddleston 31' m Horne (2) 34' c, 78' m Rowe 37' c Smith 69' c Con: Horne (4/6) 28', 35', 38', 70'; Cards: Hastings (yellow card) 78'	Report	Try: Kenny 17' m Keenan 41' c Frawley 73' m Con: Prendergast (1/3) 42'; Cards: Deeny (yellow card) 26'; Kelleher (yellow card) 29'; Slimani (yellow card) 79'	Attendance: 7,321; Referee: Adam Jones (Wales)

22 March 2026	(1 BP) Stormers (South Africa)	29–21	(Wales) Dragons	Cape Town Stadium, Cape Town
15:00	Try: Feinberg-Mngomezulu (2) 9' c, 17' c Roos 49' c Simelane 59' m Con: Feinberg-Mngomezulu (3/4) 10', 18', 50'; Pen: Feinberg-Mngomezulu 43'	Report	Try: Davies 25' c Young 53' c Dyer 72' c Con: O'Brien (3/3) 26', 54', 73'	Attendance: 15,079; Referee: Andrew Brace (Ireland)

=== Round 14 ===
27 March 2026	Sharks (South Africa)	21–15	(Wales) Cardiff (1 BP)	Kings Park Stadium, Durban
17:00	Try: Buthelezi 6' c, 32' c Penxe 38' c Con: Hendrikse 7', 39'; Davids 33'; Cards: Hendrikse (yellow card) 27'	Report	Try: Grady 17' c, 28' m Con: Sheedy 18'; Pen: Lloyd 73'	Attendance: 11,578; Referee: Gianluca Gnecchi (Italy)

27 March 2026	(1 BP) Glasgow Warriors (Scotland)	31–10	(Italy) Benetton	Scotstoun Stadium, Glasgow
19:45	Try: Matthews 38' c Watson 42' c Williamson 60' m Stephen 67' m Talakai 73' c Con: Hastings 39', 43'; Lancaster 74'	Report	Try: Odogwu 15' c Con: Smith 16'; Pen: Smith 40+1'; Cards: Odogwu (yellow card) 23'	Attendance: 7,266; Referee: Ben Breakspear (Wales)

27 March 2026	(1 BP) Leinster (Ireland)	36–19	(Wales) Scarlets	Aviva Stadium, Dublin
19:45	Try: Ringrose 29' c Kenny (2) 34' m, 75' c O'Brien (2) 43' m, 46' m Deegan 67' c Con: Byrne (3/6) 30', 67', 76'; Cards: Deeny (yellow card) 17'	Report	Try: Roberts 17'; Rogers 57'; Douglas 72'; Con: Hawkins (2/3) 18', 73'; Cards: Roberts (yellow card) 23'; Taylor (yellow card) 28'	Attendance: 15,301; Referee: Quinton Immelman (South Africa)

28 March 2026	(1 BP) Bulls (South Africa)	34–31	(Ireland) Munster (2 BP)	Loftus Versfeld Stadium, Pretoria
12:00	Try: Papier (2) 30' c, 47' c Moodie 35' c Jooste 58' c Con: Pollard (4/4) 31', 36', 47', 59'; Pen: Pollard 61', 73'; Cards: Nortje (yellow card) 33'	Report	Try: O'Brien 20' c Ahern (2) 42' m, 52' c O'Connor 67' c E. Edogbo 75' m Con: Crowley (3/5) 21', 53', 68'	Attendance: 9,561; Referee: Hollie Davidson (Scotland)

28 March 2026	Connacht (Ireland)	21–14	(Wales) Ospreys (1 BP)	The Sportsground, Galway
14:15	Try: Hurley-Langton (2) 11' c, 45' c Devine 74' c Con: Naughton (3/3) 12', 46', 75'; Cards: Murray (yellow card) 48'	Report	Try: Kasende 23' c L. Morgan 56' c Con: Edwards (2/2) 24', 57'; Cards: J. Morgan (yellow card) 72'	Attendance: 7,943; Referee: Matteo Liperini (Italy)

28 March 2026	(1 BP) Lions (South Africa)	42–26	(Wales) Dragons (1 BP)	Ellis Park Stadium, Johannesburg
14:30	Try: Mahashe 5' m Kriel 26' c C. Smith 50' c Steyn (2) 55' m, 63' c Cronjé 67' m Con: Smith (3/6) 27', 51', 63'; Pen: Smith (2) 18', 39'	Report	Try: A. Owen (2) 15' c, 32' c Dyer (2) 47' c, 70' m Con: O'Brien (3//4) 16', 33', 47'; Cards: Dyer (yellow card) 54'	Attendance: 3,212; Referee: Andrew Brace (Ireland)

28 March 2026	(1 BP) Stormers (South Africa)	33–14	(Scotland) Edinburgh	Cape Town Stadium
17:00	Try: Roos (2) 25' c, 68' c Zas 49' m Mchunu 63' c Fourie 80' c Con: Feinberg-Mngomezulu (4/5) 25', 63', 69', 80+1'	Report	Try: Lang 34' c Venter 58' c Con: Thompson (2) 35', 59'	Attendance: 21,487; Referee: Gianluca Gnecchi (Italy)

28 March 2026	Zebre (Italy)	12–28	(Ireland) Ulster (1 BP)	Stadio Sergio Lanfranchi, Parma
19:45	Try: Di Bertolomeo 11' c Trulla 75' c Con: Roger (1/2) 12'; Cards: Gesi (red card) 28'	Report	Try: McAllister 20' c Herring 44' c Ward 52' c Kok 69' c Con: Humphreys (2/2) 21', 45'; Doak (2/2) 53', 69'; Cards: Wilson (yellow card) 84'	Attendance: 3,256; Referee: Craig Evans (Wales)

=== Round 15 ===
17 April 2026	(1BP) Edinburgh (Scotland)	31–30	(Italy) Zebre (2 BP)	Edinburgh Rugby Stadium
19:45	Try: Boyle 5' c Patterson 19' c Ashman (2) 36' m, 61' m Venter 79' c Con: Thompson (2) 6', 20'; Scott 80'	Report	Try: Fusco 10' c Gesi 14' m Trulla 46' m Nocera 73' c Con: Montemauri (2/4) 11', 74'; Pen: Montemauri (2) 41', 67'	Attendance: 6,818; Referee: Christopher Allison (South Africa)

17 April 2026	Ulster (Ireland)	21–29	(Ireland) Leinster (1 BP)	Ravenhill Stadium, Belfast
19:45	Try: Bryn Ward 55' c Zac Ward (2) 62', 65' c Con: Doak (3/3) 56', 63', 66'; Cards: Sheridan (yellow card) 46'	Report	Try: Culhane 17' c J. O'Brien 38' m Henshaw 45' c Prendergast 51' c Con: Prendergast (3/4) 17', 46', 52'; Pen: Prendergast 24'; Cards: Deegan (red card) 61'	Attendance: 18,196; Referee: Andrew Brace (Ireland)

17 April 2026	Dragons (Wales)	7–47	(South Africa) Bulls (1 BP)	Rodney Parade, Newport
19:45	Try: Inisi 23' c Con: Evans 24'	Report	Try: Papier 11' c Grobbelaar 37' m Coetzee 44' c Van Staden (2) 57' c, 74' c Williams 77' c Petersen 80' c Con: Pollard (3/4) 11', 45', 58'; Kriel (3/3) 75', 78', 80+1'	Attendance: 5,892; Referee: Sam Grove-White (Scotland)

18 April 2026	Stormers (South Africa)	24–33	(Ireland) Connacht (1 BP)	Cape Town Stadium
13:45	Try: Roos 14' c Mchunu 47' c Feinberg-Mngomezulu 62' c Con: Feinberg-Mngomezulu (3/3) 14', 48', 63'; Pen: Feinberg-Mngomezulu 41'; Cards: Fourie (yellow card) 4'	Report	Try: Hurley-Langton 7' c Boyle 51' c Devine 64' m Murphy 70' c Naughton 78' c Con: Gilbert (3/4) 7', 71', 79'; Naughton 51'	Attendance: 13,903; Referee: Federico Vedovelli (Italy)

18 April 2026	(1 BP) Lions (South Africa)	54–12	(Scotland) Glasgow Warriors	Ellis Park Stadium, Johannesburg
16:00	Try: Van Wyk (2) 6' c, 19' c Cronjé 10' m SJ Kotze 40' c Venter 44' c Van den Berg 68' c Mahashe 72' c Q. Horn 75'; Con: C. Smith (7/8) 7', 19', 41', 45', 69', 73', 76'	Report	Try: Lancaster 31' c McDowall 58' m Con: Lancaster (1/2) 32'	Attendance: 3,677; Referee: Peter Martin (Ireland)

18 April 2026	(2 BP) Scarlets (Wales)	24–28	(Wales) Cardiff (1 BP)	Parc y Scarlets, Llanelli
17:30	Try: Plumtree 23' m J. Williams 46' c Blacker 48' m Murray 54'; Con: Hawkins (2/4) 47', 55'; Cards: Plumtree (yellow card) 70'; Murray (yellow card) 76'	Report	Try: Thomas 10' c Sebastian (2) 71' c, 80+1' c Winnett 77' c Con: Sheedy (4/4) 10', 72', 77', 80+2'	Attendance: 9,025; Referee: Morné Ferreira (South Africa)

18 April 2026	Benetton (Italy)	15–45	(Ireland) Munster (1 BP)	Stadio Comunale di Monigo, Treviso
19:45	Try: Bernasconi 32' c Garbisi 80' m Con: Umaga (1/2) 52'; Pen: Umaga 28'	Report	Try: Nash 7' c Farrell 17' m Coombes 34' c Kleyn 46' c Kendellen 56' m Beirne 59' c Gleeson 78' c Con: Crowley 8', 35', 46', 59', 79'; Cards: Crowley (yellow card) 63'; Casey (yellow card) 66'	Attendance: 5,000; Referee: Ben Whitehouse (Wales)

18 April 2026	Ospreys (Wales)	21–17	(South Africa) Sharks (1 BP)	Brewery Field, Bridgend
19:45	Try: Edwards 11' c Morgan 30' c Phillips 54' c Con: Edwards (3/3) 12', 31', 55'	Report	Try: Buthelezi (2) 18' m, 69' m Hooker 40' c Con: Smith (1/3) 41'	Attendance: 3,917; Referee: Mike Adamson (Scotland)

=== Round 16 ===
24 April 2026	(1 BP) Edinburgh (Scotland)	33–28	(South Africa) Sharks (2 BP)	Edinburgh Rugby Stadium
19:45	Try: Ashman 15' c Young 33' c Tuipulotu 60' m Patterson 63' c Graham 69' c Con: Scott (2/2) 16', 34'; Thompson (2/3) 64', 70'	Report	Try: Van der Merwe 6' c E. Tshituka 20' c Koch 56' c V. Tshituka 80' c Con: J. Smith (4/4) 7', 20', 57', 80+1'	Attendance: 7,774; Referee: Ben Breakspear (Wales)

24 April 2026	(1 BP) Zebre (Italy)	18–19	(Wales) Dragons	Stadio Sergio Lanfranchi, Parma
19:45	Try: Di Bartolomeo 43' m Locatelli 70' c Con: Da Re (1/2) 71'; Pen: Da Re (2) 14', 53'	Report	Try: Rosser 24' c Carter 68' c Richards 80+3' m Con: O'Brien (2/3) 25', 68'; Cards: Douglas (yellow card) 43'	Attendance: 3,417; Referee: Ru Campbell (Scotland)

24 April 2026	Cardiff (Wales)	24–21	(Wales) Ospreys (1 BP)	Cardiff Arms Park
19:45	Try: Thornton 24' c Belcher 46' c Thomas 56' c Con: Sheedy (3/3) 25', 47', 57'; Pen: Sheedy 17'; Cards: Belcher (yellow card) 6'; McNally (yellow card) 74'	Report	Try: Williams 37' c Walsh 68' c Edwards 76' c Con: Edwards (3/3) 38', 69', 77'; Cards: Kasende (red card) 16'; Watkin (yellow card) 24'; Edwards (yellow card) 45'	Attendance: 12,036; Referee: Christopher Allison (South Africa)

25 April 2026	(1 BP) Stormers (South Africa)	48–12	(Scotland) Glasgow Warriors	Cape Town Stadium
12:30 (rearranged)	Try: Mchunu (2) 9' c, 14' c Roos 29' c Nel 49' c Feinberg-Mngomezulu, 72 c Morabe, 78' c Con: Feinberg-Mngomezulu (6/6) 10', 15', 30', 49', 73', 77'; Pen: Feinberg-Mngomezulu (2) 5', 43'; Cards: Reinach (yellow card) 37'	Report	Try: O. Smith 25' m Hiddleston 38' c Con: Hastings (1/2) 38'; Cards: Dempsey (yellow card) 14'; Hastings (yellow card) 42'	Attendance: 23,740; Referee: Eoghan Cross (Ireland)

25 April 2026	(1 BP) Lions (South Africa)	33–21	(Ireland) Connacht	Ellis Park Stadium, Johannesburg
15:00	Try: Davids 5' c Van Wyk (2) 22' c, 72' m Mahashe 40' c Cronjé 44' c Con: C. Smith (4/5) 6', 23', 41', 45'; Cards: SJ Kotze (yellow card) 47'	Report	Try: M. Devine (2) 49' c, 77' c Boyle 80+1' c Con: Gilbert (3/3) 49', 77', 80+2'	Attendance: 6,881; Referee: Filippo Russo (Italy)

25 April 2026	(1 BP) Munster (Ireland)	41–14	(Ireland) Ulster	Thomond Park, Limerick
17:30	Try: Hodnett (4) 24' m, 29' c, 55' m, 68' m Kendellen (3) 47' m, 53' c, 69' c Con: JJ Hanrahan (3/7) 30', 53', 70'	Report	Try: King 13' c Andrew 65' c Con: Flannery (2) 13', 66'; Cards: Brigg (yellow card) 23'	Attendance: 17,364; Referee: Sam Grove-White (Scotland)

25 April 2026	(1 BP) Scarlets (Wales)	21–23	(South Africa) Bulls	Parc y Scarlets, Llanelli
19:45	Try: Woolley 9' m James 20' m Anderson 50' m Pen: Hawkins (2) 63', 75'	Report	Try: Jooste 3' c Pollard 28' c Con: Pollard (2/2) 4', 29'; Pen: Pollard (3) 57', 69', 80+1'; Cards: Gans (yellow card) 44'; Klopper (yellow card) 49'	Attendance: 5,180; Referee: Gianluca Gnecchi (Italy)

25 April 2026	(1 BP) Benetton (Italy)	29–26	(Ireland) Leinster (2 BP)	Stadio Comunale di Monigo, Treviso
19:45	Try: Garbisi 9' m Mendy 47' c Gasperini (2) 61' c, 71' c Con: Umaga (3/4) 48', 62', 72'; Pen: Umaga 80+3'	Report	Try: O'Tighearnaigh 14' c Van der Flier 36' c Gibson-Park 43' m Frawley 66' c Con: Byrne (2/3) 15', 37'; Prendergast (1/1) 67'	Attendance: 6,327; Referee: Ferreira (South Africa)

=== Round 17 ===
8 May 2026	(1 BP) Glasgow Warriors (Scotland)	40–17	(Wales) Cardiff	Scotstoun Stadium, Glasgow
19:45	Try: Dempsey 19' c Steyn 24' c Matthews (2) 32' c, 54' c Schickerling 65' m Rowe 74' c Con: Horne (4/5) 20', 26', 33', 55'; O. Smith (1/1) 74'	Report	Try: J. Adams 28' c Southworth 59' m Beetham 80' m Con: Sheedy (1/3) 29'	Attendance: 7,321; Referee: Eoghan Cross (Ireland)

8 May 2026	(1 BP) Ulster (Ireland)	38–38	(South Africa) Stormers (1 BP)	Ravenhill Stadium, Belfast
19:45	Try: Kok (3) 4' c, 28' c, 71' m Z. Ward 35' c Lowry 45' m O'Sullivan 75' c Con: Doak (4/6) 5', 30', 36', 77'; Cards: Henderson (red card) 9'; Doak (yellow card) 80'	Report	Try: Roos 6' c Feinberg-Mngomezulu (2) 14' c, 64' c Khan 49' c Penalty try 80'; Con: Feinberg-Mngomezulu (4/4) 7', 15', 49', 64'; Pen: Feinberg-Mngomezulu 21'; Cards: Matthee (yellow card) 76'	Attendance: 9,782; Referee: Andrea Piardi (Italy)

9 May 2026	(1 BP) Bulls (South Africa)	54–19	(Italy) Zebre	Loftus Versfeld Stadium, Pretoria
12:45	Try: Le Roux 3' c Moodie 14' c Jooste 23' m Petersen 30' c Vermaak 49' c Hanekom 63' c Vorster 69' c Rudolph 77' c Con: Le Roux (7/8) 4', 15', 31', 50', 63', 70', 78'	Report	Try: Trulla 20' c Ribaldi 41' m Dominguez 59' c Con: Roger (2/3) 21', 60'	Attendance: 5,685; Referee: Ben Whitehouse (Wales)

9 May 2026	(1 BP) Sharks (South Africa)	46–7	(Italy) Benetton	Kings Park Stadium, Durban
15:00	Try: Van der Merwe (2) 11' m, 40' m Julius (3) 21' m, 59' c, 62' c Kolisi 27' m Esterhuizen 43' c Bester 80' m Con: Davids (1/5) 44'; J. Smith (2/3) 59', 63'	Report	Try: Tizzano 78' c Con: Garbisi 79'; Cards: Umaga (red card) 37'; Bernasconi (yellow card) 25'	Attendance: 11,809; Referee: Ben Breakspear (Wales)

9 May 2026	Ospreys (Wales)	27–20	(Wales) Scarlets (1 BP)	Brewery Field, Bridgend
17:30	Try: Edwards (2) 7' c, 37' c Morgan 74' c Con: Edwards (3/3) 7', 38', 75'; Pen: Edwards (2) 26', 80+1'; Cards: R. Smith (yellow card) 45'	Report	Try: Douglas 10' m Plumtree 47' m Murray 57' c Con: Hawkins (1/3) 58'; Pen: Hawkins 42'; Cards: Roberts (yellow card) 33'; Mathias (yellow card) 41'	Attendance: 7,700; Referee: Ben Connor (Wales)

9 May 2026	(1 BP) Leinster (Ireland)	31–7	(South Africa) Lions	Aviva Stadium, Dublin
17:30	Try: J. Osborne 2' c Clarkson 24' c Keenan 70' c Ioane 74' m J. O'Brien 80' m Con: Prendergast (2/2) 3', 24'; Frawley (1/3) 71'	Report	Try: F. Horn 35' c Con: C. Smith 36'	Attendance: 16,259; Referee: Hollie Davidson (Scotland)

9 May 2026	Dragons (Wales)	15–24	(Scotland) Edinburgh (1 BP)	Rodney Parade, Newport
19:45	Try: Lewis 28' c Keddie 44' m Con: O'Brien (1/2) 29'; Pen: O'Brien 8'	Report	Try: Ashman 18' c Currie 40' c Van der Merwe (2) 49' m, 74' m Con: Thompson (2/4) 19', 41'; Cards: Richardson (yellow card) 52'; Venter (yellow card) 66'	Attendance: 7,079; Referee: Filippo Russo (Italy)

9 May 2026	(1 BP) Connacht (Ireland)	26–7	(Ireland) Munster	The Sportsground, Galway
19:45	Try: B. Murphy 13' c Bolton 21' m Hurley-Langton 34' c Jansen 72' c Con: Gilbert (3/4) 13', 35', 73'	Report	Try: Casey 68' c Con: Hanrahan 69'; Cards: Barron (red card) 16'	Attendance: 12,481; Referee: Peter Martin (Ireland)

=== Round 18 ===
15 May 2026	(1 BP) Cardiff (Wales)	22–16	(South Africa) Stormers (1 BP)	Cardiff Arms Park
19:45	Try: Beetham (2) 16' c, 49' m Bowen 20' m Lloyd 40' m Con: Lloyd (1/4) 17'; Cards: Belcher (yellow card) 4'; Hughes (yellow card) 80+1'	Report	Try: A. Smith 7'; Con: Feinberg-Mngomezulu 8'; Pen: Feinberg-Mngomezulu (3) 30', 46', 80+2'; Cards: A. Smith (yellow card) 38'	Attendance: 10,143; Referee: Andrew Brace (Ireland)

15 May 2026	(2 BP) Ulster (Ireland)	22–26	(Scotland) Glasgow Warriors (1 BP)	Ravenhill Stadium, Belfast
19:45	Try: Z. Ward (2) 19', 33'; Mcilroy 59'; Murphy 68'; Con: Flannery 33'	Report	Try: McDowall 8' c McBeth 37' c Horne 40+2' c Rowe 76' m Con: Horne (3/4) 9', 38', 40+3'; Cards: McBeth (yellow card) 22'; McKay (yellow card) 45'	Attendance: 11,556; Referee: Gianluca Gnecchi (Italy)

15 May 2026	Edinburgh (Scotland)	5–26	(Ireland) Connacht (1 BP)	Edinburgh Rugby Stadium
19:45	Try: Ashman 72'	Report	Try: Ioane 24' m Hurley-Langton (2) 36' c, 43' c Devine 60' c Con: Gilbert (3/4) 36', 44', 61'	Attendance: 7,778; Referee: Aimee Barrett-Theron (South Africa)

16 May 2026	(1 BP) Sharks (South Africa)	54–19	(Italy) Zebre	Kings Park Stadium, Durban
12:45	Try: Wiliams 14' m Kolisi (2) 26' c, 41' c Siyaya 29' c Moyo 47' c E. Tshituka 54' c Malan 65' c Braude 68' c Con: Moyo (5/6) 27', 31', 42', 48', 55'; J. Smith (2/2) 66', 68'	Report	Try: Faissal 20' c Gesi 63' c Quattrini 76' m Con: Montemauri (2/3) 21', 64'; Cards: Fusco (yellow card) 40'	Attendance: 8,428; Referee: Adam Jones (Wales)

16 May 2026	(1 BP) Bulls (South Africa)	45–19	(Italy) Benetton	Loftus Versfeld Stadium, Pretoria
15:00	Try: Petersen (2) 4' c, 57' c Le Roux 13' c Grobbelaar 29' m Wiese 38' c Gumede 63' c Nortjé 75' m Con: Pollard (5/7) 5', 13', 38', 58', 64'	Report	Try: Lynagh (2) 19' m, 42' c R. Smith 40' c Con: R. Smith (2/3) 40', 43'; Cards: Garbisi (yellow card) 32'	Attendance: 10,521; Referee: Craig Evans (Wales)

16 May 2026	(1 BP) Leinster (Ireland)	68–14	(Wales) Ospreys	Aviva Stadium, Dublin
17:15	Try: J. McCarthy (3) 4' c, 55' m, 62' c Deegan 7' c Van der Flier 20' c J. O'Brien 23' c Ringrose 44' c Larmour (2) 53' c, 58' c Lowe 64' c Con: Byrne (4/4) 4', 7', 21', 24'; Frawley (5/6) 45', 53', 58', 63', 65'	Report	Try: Owen-Sutton 31' c Edwards 78' c Con: Edwards (2/2) 32', 79'	Attendance: 15,104; Referee: Ru Campbell (Scotland)

16 May 2026	(1 BP) Scarlets (Wales)	35–35	(Wales) Dragons (1 BP)	Parc y Scarlets, Llanelli
17:15	Try: Plumtree (2) 2' c, 15' c Macleod 51' c Taylor 59' c Page 75' c Con: Hawkins (5/5) 2', 16', 51', 59', 76'; Cards: G. Davies (yellow card) 57'; Leggatt-Jones (yellow card) 63'	Report	Try: Young 4' c Coghlan 12' c Wainwright 36' m Penalty try 58'; Con: O'Brien (2/3) 5', 13'; Pen: O'Brien (2) 9', 43', 64'	Attendance: 7,418; Referee: Ben Whitehouse (Wales)

16 May 2026	Munster (Ireland)	24–17	(South Africa) Lions (1 BP)	Thomond Park, Limerick
19:45	Try: O'Connell 7' c Casey 41' c Ahern 54' c Con: JJ Hanrahan (3/3) 8', 42', 54'; Pen: JJ Hanrahan 23'; Cards: A. Smith (yellow card) 27'; O'Brien (yellow card) 30'	Report	Try: Q. Horn 14' c Mpeku 35' c Con: C. Smith (2/2) 15', 36'; Pen: C. Smith 60'	Attendance: 12,301; Referee: Andrea Piardi (Italy)

== Knockout stage ==
=== Bracket ===
The top eight teams in the regular season standings advance to the knockout stage, a single-elimination tournament culminating in a Grand Final to crown the overall champion.

Teams are seeded based on the regular season standings, with teams ranked 1–4 receiving home field advantage in the quarter-final, with 1 playing 8, 2 playing 7 etc. The top two teams in the standings are seeded so as not to meet until the Grand Final.

Home-field advantage for the semi-finals and Grand Final will be awarded to the highest-ranked team in each tie; the top two teams are therefore guaranteed home advantage until the final for as long as they remain in the tournament, and the top ranked team, Glasgow Warriors, in the standings will be awarded home advantage should they reach the Grand Final. In the build up to the final week of the regular season, it was reported that Glasgow Warriors may be forced to play a semi-final and final outside Scotland due to venue unavailability, although they would technically remain the home team. In the week of the quarter-final, it was announced they would, if they progressed, play their semi-final and Grand Final on home soil, at Murrayfield Stadium, Edinburgh.

Cardiff and Lions both made the play-offs for the first time. Stormers, Glasgow Warriors, Leinster, Munster and Bulls reached their fifth URC play-off phase from five seasons. Glasgow Warriors became the first non-Irish team to top the regular season table and take the number one seeding since they did so themselves in 2019.

Quarter-finals
1	(Scotland) Glasgow Warriors	33
8	(Ireland) Connacht	21
4	(South Africa) Bulls	45
5	(Ireland) Munster	14
3	(South Africa) Stormers	44
6	(Wales) Cardiff	21
2	(Ireland) Leinster	59
7	(South Africa) Lions	10

Semi-finals
1	(Scotland) Glasgow Warriors	21
4	(South Africa) Bulls	22
2	(Ireland) Leinster	20
3	(South Africa) Stormers	11

Final
2	(Ireland) Leinster	36
4	(South Africa) Bulls	7

=== Quarter-finals ===
All four quarter-finals went the way of the home teams, bringing the streak of knockout home wins in the competition to eleven over two seasons. The closest game was the Friday night showdown between top seeds Glasgow Warriors and form team Connacht, with the home side overcoming the opposition by 33 points to 21. The three quarter-finals held on Saturday all ended in comfortable blow-out wins for the home team, Stormers, Bulls and Leinster.

29 May 2026
19:45

Glasgow Warriors (Scotland) (1)	33–21	(8) (Ireland) Connacht
Try: Schickerling 10' c Steyn (2) 44' c. 74' m MvKay 55' c Oguntibeju 68' c Con: Horne 10', 44', 55', 69'; Cards: Samuel (yellow card) 64'	Report; Highlights	Try: Prendergast 4' c Heffernan 64' c Bealham 71' c Con: Gilbert 5', 65', 71'; Cards: Sam Illo (yellow card) 13'

Scotstoun Stadium, Glasgow
Attendance: 7,321
Referee: Adam Jones (Wales)

30 May 2026
13:00

Bulls (South Africa) (4)	45–14	(5) (Ireland) Munster
Try: Papier (2) 5' c, 54' c Arendse 8' c Grobbelaar 35' c Hanekom 39' c Jacobs 59' c Con: Pollard (6/6) 5', 10', 36', 40', 54', 60'; Pen: Pollard 23'	Report; Highlights	Try: O'Donoghue 20' c Nankivell 32' c Con: Hanrahan (2/2) 20', 33'

Loftus Versfeld Stadium, Pretoria
Attendance: 18,756
Referee: Andrea Piardi (Italy)

30 May 2026
15:30

Stormers (South Africa) (3)	44–21	(6) (Wales) Cardiff
Try: Venter 24' c Mchunu 29' c Zas 36' c Feinberg-Mngomezulu 52' m De Villiers 64' m Kotze 78' c Con: Feinberg-Mngomezulu (3/4) 25', 30', 37'; Jurie Matthee (1/2) 79'; Pen: Matthee (2) 69', 80+1'	Report; Highlights	Try: Winnett 19' c Basham 45' c Botham 60' c Con: Lloyd (3/3) 20', 46', 61'; Cards: Assiratti (yellow card) 32'; Sebastian (yellow card) 64'

Cape Town Stadium, Cape Town
Attendance: 30,595
Referee: Eoghan Cross (Ireland)

30 May 2026
19:45

Leinster (Ireland) (2)	59–10	(7) (South Africa) Lions
Try: Sheehan 10' c Keenan 15' c Ryan 40' c Penny 43' m Prendergast 46' c G. McCarthy 55' c O'Brien 64' c Lowe (2) 68' c, 80+1' m Con: Prendergast (7/9) 11', 16', 40+1', 47', 56', 65', 69'; Cards: Clarkson (yellow card) 35'	Report; Highlights	Try: Van Wyk (2) 36' m, 58' m Cards: Horn (yellow card) 54'

Aviva Stadium, Dublin
Attendance: 9,493
Referee: Sam Grove-White (Scotland)

=== Semi-finals ===
The home win streak in URC play-off matches ended at 11 at Murrayfield Stadium as top seeds Glasgow Warriors, despite an early 21–3 lead, succumbed to a comeback from three-time beaten finalists Bulls, who booked their fourth final in five for their fourth assault on the United Rugby Championship title. The venue for that assault would be decided by the result in the second semi-final as Leinster defeated Stormers by 20 to 11. With the win, Leinster created a second successive home final against the Bulls at Croke Park.

6 June 2026
14:30

Glasgow Warriors (Scotland) (1)	21–22	(4) (South Africa) Bulls
Try: Steyn (2) 15' c, 19' c Penalty try 35'; Con: Lancaster (2/2) 16', 20'; Cards: Cummings (yellow card) 44'	Report; Highlights	Try: Grobbelaar 32' c Papier 45' m Klopper 53' c Con: Pollard (2/3) 32', 54'; Pen: Pollard 7'; Cards: Pollard (yellow card) 9'; Nortjé (yellow card) 25'

Murrayfield Stadium, Edinburgh
Attendance: 17,981
Referee: Andrew Brace (Ireland)

6 June 2026
17:30

Leinster (Ireland) (2)	20–11	(3) (South Africa) Stormers
Try: Ioane 8' c Gibson-Park 70' c Con: Prendergast 9'; Byrne 71'; Pen: Prendergast (2) 18', 24'	Report; Highlights	Try: A. Smith 28' m Pen: Matthee (2) 35', 53'; Cards: Zas (yellow card) 47'; Ackermann (red card) 69'; Moerat (yellow card) 70'

Aviva Stadium, Dublin
Attendance: 15,346
Referee: Hollie Davidson (Scotland)

== Grand Final ==
19 June 2026
19:30 BST/IST
20:30 SAST

Leinster (Ireland) (2)	36–7	(4) (South Africa) Bulls
Try: T. O'Brien 6' c Ioane 16' m Conan 27' c Prendergast 46' c Byrne 76' c Con: Prendergast (3/4) 6', 27', 46'; Byrne 77'; Pen: Prendergast 32'; Cards: Lowe (yellow card) 59'	Report; Highlights	Try: Moodie 62' c Con: Pollard 63'; Cards: Moodie (yellow card) 2'; Le Roux (yellow card) 26'

Croke Park, Dublin
Attendance: 39,184
Referee: Andrea Piardi (Italy)

== 2025–26 URC Awards ==
Award	Sponsor	Winner	Team	Notes
URC Players' Player of the Year	BTK	(South Africa) Sacha Feinberg-Mngomezulu	(South Africa) Stormers	Award by vote of URC players
URC Coaches' Coach of the Year	—N/a	(South Africa) Ivan van Rooyen	(South Africa) Lions	Award by vote of URC coaches.
URC Golden Boot	Gilbert	(South Africa) Chris Smith	(South Africa) Lions	Awarded to the top scorer from the boot, 149.
URC Top Try Scorer	OFX	(South Africa) Evan Roos	(South Africa) Stormers	Awarded to the top try scorer, 12.
URC Try of the Season	URC.tv	(Australia) Angus Bell	(Ireland) Ulster	Awarded to the best regular season try as chosen by fan vote.
URC Playmaker of the Year	—N/a	(Australia) Jack Walsh	(Wales) Ospreys	
URC 'Tackle Machine'	—N/a	(Wales) Ben Carter	(Wales) Dragons	Awarded to player that topped league tackle count – 97.6%
URC 'Ironman'	—N/a	(South Africa) Quan Horn	(South Africa) Lions	Awarded to player with most regular season minutes played, 1440 minutes
URC Next-Gen Player of the Year	—N/a	(Wales) Tom Bowen	(Wales) Cardiff	Awarded to young player of the year. Selected by rugby media.
URC South African Player of the Year	Vodacom	(South Africa) Embrose Papier	(South Africa) Bulls	Awarded to best player from a South African Shield. Sponsored by South African naming sponsor. Voted on by coaches and media in South Africa.
URC Innovation Award	—N/a	(South Africa) Bulls		Team award

=== URC 'Elite XV' Team of the Year ===
The League announced its 'Elite XV' team of the year in June 2026. Bulls and Stormers were the most represented teams, with three players each in the XV.

Position	Number	Player	Team
FB	15	(South Africa) Quan Horn	(South Africa) Lions
RW	14	(South Africa) Werner Kok	(Ireland) Ulster
OC	13	(Scotland) Stafford McDowall	(Scotland) Glasgow Warriors
IC	12	(Ireland) Stuart McCloskey	(Ireland) Ulster
LW	11	(Scotland) Kyle Rowe	(Scotland) Glasgow Warriors
FH	10	(South Africa) Sacha Feinberg-Mngomezulu	(South Africa) Stormers
SH	9	(South Africa) Embrose Papier	(South Africa) Bulls
N8	8	(South Africa) Evan Roos	(South Africa) Stormers
OF	7	(South Africa) Ruan Venter	(South Africa) Lions
BF	6	(Ireland) Cian Prendergast	(Ireland) Connacht
RL	5	(South Africa) Cobus Weise	(South Africa) Bulls
LL	4	(Ireland) Darragh Murray	(Ireland) Connacht
TP	3	(Ireland) Thomas Clarkson	(Ireland) Leinster
HK	2	(South Africa) Johann Grobbelaar	(South Africa) Bulls
LP	1	(South Africa) Ntuthuko Mchunu	(South Africa) Stormers

== Leading scorers ==
Note: Flags to the left of player names indicate national team as has been defined under World Rugby eligibility rules, or primary nationality for players who have not yet earned international senior caps. Players may hold one or more non-WR nationalities. Includes post season points scored.

=== Most points ===
Rank	Player	Club	Points
1	(South Africa) Sacha Feinberg-Mngomezulu	(South Africa) Stormers	169
2	(South Africa) Chris Smith	(South Africa) Lions	154
3	(South Africa) Handré Pollard	(South Africa) Bulls	127
4	(Wales) Dan Edwards	(Wales) Ospreys	110
5	(Ireland) Nathan Doak	(Ireland) Ulster	97
5	(Ireland) Sam Prendergast	(Ireland) Leinster	97
7	(Samoa) Jacob Umaga	(Italy) Benetton	96
8	(Wales) Angus O'Brien	(Wales) Dragons	94
9	(South Africa) Jurie Matthee	(South Africa) Stormers	92
10	(New Zealand) Sam Gilbert	(Ireland) Connacht	90

=== Most tries ===
Rank	Player	Club	Tries
1	(South Africa) Embrose Papier	(South Africa) Bulls	12
1	(South Africa) Evan Roos	(South Africa) Stormers	12
3	(Ireland) Zac Ward	(Ireland) Ulster	11
4	(South Africa) Sacha Feinberg-Mngomezulu	(South Africa) Stormers	10
4	(South Africa) Johan Grobbelaar	(South Africa) Bulls	10
4	(South Africa) Werner Kok	(Ireland) Ulster	10
4	(New Zealand) Sean Jansen	(Ireland) Connacht	10
8	(Ireland) Joshua Kenny	(Ireland) Leinster	9
9	(Scotland) Ewan Ashman	(Scotland) Edinburgh	8
9	(Italy) Louis Lynagh	(Italy) Benetton	8
9	(South Africa) Henco van Wyk	(South Africa) Lions	8

== Attendances ==
=== Attendances by club ===
Regular season

Below are the total, average, highest and lowest attendances of each club in the regular season.

Club	Home games	Total	Average	Highest	Lowest
(Italy) Benetton	9	45,459	5,051	6,327	4,806
(South Africa) Bulls	9	122,373	13,597	33,280	2,992
(Wales) Cardiff	9	81,197	9,022	12,125	5,711
(Ireland) Connacht	9	62,921	6,547	12,482	3,928
(Wales) Dragons	9	54,671	6,074	8,369	4,188
(Scotland) Edinburgh	9	95,108	10,568	38,179	6,502
(Scotland) Glasgow Warriors	9	77,251	8,532	21,093	6,476
(Ireland) Leinster	9	190,437	21,160	51,859	14,128
(South Africa) Lions	9	54,269	6,030	12,571	1,771
(Ireland) Munster	9	128,450	14,272	26,006	8,422
(Wales) Ospreys	9	46,506	5,167	7,700	3,761
(Wales) Scarlets	9	66,089	7,343	12,105	5,029
(South Africa) Sharks	9	157,665	17,518	44,517	8,428
(South Africa) Stormers	9	235,380	26,153	53,682	13,688
(Ireland) Ulster	9	113,451	12,606	18,196	9,563
(Italy) Zebre	9	24,540	2,727	4,500	1,803
Overall	144	1,555,767	10,804	53,682	1,771

Play-offs

Below are the total and average gates for those teams with home matches in play-offs. Teams in Italics have no further potential home matches to play.

Club	Home games	Total	Average
(South Africa) Bulls	1	18,756	18,756
(Scotland) Glasgow Warriors	2	25,302	12,651
(Ireland) Leinster	3	64,023	21,341
(South Africa) Stormers	1	30,595	30,595
Overall	6	99,492	16,582

=== Highest attendances ===
Individual matches

As in previous seasons, the largest attendances were broadly in 'derby' games which counted for the regional shields.

Grand Final Irish Shield tie Welsh Shield tie Scottish-Italian Shield tie South African Shield tie

Rank	Attendance	Date	Home	Score	Away	Venue
1	53,682	3 January 2026	Stormers	13–8	Bulls	Cape Town Stadium
2	52,087	24 January 2026	Stormers	19–30	Sharks	Cape Town Stadium
3	51,859	18 October 2025	Leinster	14–31	Munster	Croke Park, Dublin
4	44,517	20 December 2025	Sharks	21-12	Bulls	King's Park Stadium, Durban
5	39,184	19 June 2026	Leinster	36–7	Bulls	Croke Park, Dublin
6	38,179	27 December 2025	Edinburgh	3–21	Glasgow Warriors	Murrayfield Stadium, Edinburgh
7	33,280	14 March 2026	Bulls	19–32	Stormers	Loftus Versfeld Stadium, Pretoria
8	32,672	28 February 2026	Bulls	41–12	Sharks	Loftus Versfeld Stadium, Pretoria
9	30,595	30 May 2026	Stormers	44–21	Cardiff	Cape Town Stadium
10	28,205	20 December 2005	Stormers	34–27	Lions	Cape Town Stadium
11	26,006	27 December 2025	Munster	8–13	Leinster	Thomand Park, Limerick
12	23,740	25 April 2026	Stormers	48–12	Glasgow Warriors	Cape Town Stadium
13	21,093	20 December 2025	Glasgow Warriors	24–12	Edinburgh	Hampden Park, Glasgow

== See also ==
European club rugby

- Major European leagues
  - 2025–26 Premiership Rugby, top level English rugby union competition
  - 2025–26 Top 14 season, top level French rugby union competition
- EPCR competitions
  - 2025–26 European Rugby Champions Cup
  - 2025–26 EPCR Challenge Cup
- Rugby Europe club competitions
  - 2025–26 Rugby Europe Super Cup
- Women's club rugby in Europe
  - 2025–26 Premiership Women's Rugby in England
  - Élite 1 in France
  - 2025–26 Celtic Challenge in Ireland, Scotland and Wales
  - 2025 IRFU Women's Interprovincial Series in Ireland

Global club rugby

- 2026 Super Rugby Pacific
- 2026 Major League Rugby
- 2026 Super Rugby Americas
