= Max Douglas (rugby union) =

Australian rugby union player

- Born: 1 January 2000 (age 26) Sydney, Australia
- Height: 201 cm (6 ft 7 in)
- Weight: 112 kg (247 lb; 17 st 9 lb)
- School: St Augustine's College

Rugby union career
- Position: Lock
- Current team: Yamaha Blue Revs
Senior career
Years	Team	Apps	(Points)
2020–2022	Waratahs	8	(0)
2022–2024	Canon Eagles	23	(25)
2024–2026	Scarlets	18	(0)
2026–	Yamaha Blue Revs	0	(0)

Max Douglas (born 1 January 2000 in Australia) is an Australian rugby union player who plays for the Shizuoka Blue Revs in the Japan Rugby League One as a lock.

== Professional career ==
=== Waratahs ===
Douglas was named in the Waratahs squad for the 2021 Super Rugby AU season. He had previously been named in the Waratahs squads for the 2020 Super Rugby season, but didn't make any appearances. He made his debut for the Waratahs in Round 6 of the 2021 Super Rugby AU season against the Reds, coming on as a replacement.

=== Yokohama Canon Eagles ===
Douglas joined the Eagles on 20 September 2022.

=== Scarlets ===
On 28 May 2024, Douglas signed with the Scarlets. Douglas made his debut in the first round of the 2024–25 United Rugby Championship against Benetton.

Douglas suffered a shoulder injury in March 2025, and returned to fitness for the opening match of the 2025–26 United Rugby Championship season. Douglas was named as man of the match on 29 November 2025, as the Scarlets beat Glasgow without conceding a point. Douglas was announced as leaving the Scarlets on 13 May 2026.
