= Che Hope =

Welsh rugby union player

- Born: 10 January 2003 (age 23) Hollybush, Wales
- Height: 178 cm (5 ft 10 in)
- Weight: 81.5

Rugby union career
- Position: Scrum-half
- Current team: Dragons
Senior career
Years	Team	Apps	(Points)
2023–	Dragons	27	(30)
- Correct as of 7 May 2023
International career
Years	Team	Apps	(Points)
2022–	Wales U20	5	(0)
- Correct as of 18 November 2026

Che Hope (born 10 January 2003) is a Welsh rugby union player, currently playing for United Rugby Championship side the Dragons. His preferred position is scrum-half.

== Professional career ==
Hope was born in Hollybush and represented both Ebbw Vale RFC and Newport RFC. He first broke through with the Dragons in the pre-season of the 2022–23 season. He debuted with the Dragons in November 2022, against the Lions, scoring a try on debut.

During the 2025–26 United Rugby Championship, Hope scored twice in the win against Connacht, and followed it up with another double a week later as they lost to Cardiff in the traditional east Wales Boxing Day derby. He signed an extension with the Dragons on 26 February 2026. His season ended prematurely, due to a hamstring injury requiring surgery.

Hope represented Wales U20 in 2022, before representing the side again in 2023.
