= Quan Horn =

South African rugby union player

- Full name: Quan Horn
- Born: 27 June 2001 (age 25) Kimberley, South Africa
- Height: 181 cm (5 ft 11 in)
- Weight: 84 kg (185 lb)
- School: Paarl Boys' High School

Rugby union career
- Position: Fullback / Wing
- Current team: Lions / Golden Lions
Senior career
Years	Team	Apps	(Points)
2022–	Golden Lions	20	(20)
2022–	Lions	96	(110)
- Correct as of 3 November 2026
International career
Years	Team	Apps	(Points)
2024–	South Africa	2	(7)
- Correct as of 16 October 2024

Quan Horn (born 27 June 2001) is a South African rugby union player for the Golden Lions in the Currie Cup. His regular position is fullback.

Horn was named in the Golden Lions side for the 2022 Currie Cup Premier Division. He made his Currie Cup debut for the Golden Lions against the Western Province in Round 1 of the 2022 Currie Cup Premier Division. Made his Springbok debut on 20 July 2024 v Portugal. Scored a try on debut.

== Statistics ==
=== Test match record ===
As of 27 September 2026

Opponent	P	W	D	L	Try	Pts	%Won
Australia	1	0	0	1	0	0	0
Portugal	1	1	0	0	1	5	100
Scotland	1	1	0	0	0	2	100
Total	3	2	0	1	1	7	66.67

=== International tries ===
As of 11 July 2026

Try	Opposing team	Location	Venue	Competition	Date	Result	Score
1	Portugal	Bloemfontein, South Africa	Free State Stadium	2024 mid-year test	20 July 2024	Win	64–21
