= Jarrod Taylor =

South African rugby union player (born 2001)

- Full name: Jarrod Taylor
- Born: 15 February 2001 (age 25) East London, South Africa
- Height: 1.88 m (6 ft 2 in)
- Weight: 100 kg (220 lb)
- School: Selborne College
- University: Stellenbosch University

Rugby union career
- Position: Flanker
- Current team: Scarlets
Senior career
Years	Team	Apps	(Points)
2022–2024	Western Province	5	(0)
2024–2026	Scarlets	26	(5)
2026-	Ealing Trailfinders	0	(0)
- Correct as of 13 October 2025
International career
Years	Team	Apps	(Points)
2019	South Africa U18	4	(5)

Jarrod Taylor (born 15 February 2001) is a South African professional rugby union player for the Ealing Trailfinders in the Champ Rugby. His regular position is flanker and previously played for the Scarlets.

Taylor was named in the Western Province side for the 2022 Currie Cup Premier Division. He made his Currie Cup debut for the Western Province against the Pumas in Round 7 of the 2022 Currie Cup Premier Division.
