= Levi Douglas =

English rugby union player

- Full name: Levi Samuel G. Douglas
- Born: 1 September 1995 (age 31)
- Height: 1.95 m (6 ft 5 in)
- Weight: 121 kg (19 st 1 lb)

Rugby union career
- Position: Lock
Amateur team(s)
Years	Team	Apps	(Points)
2012–13	Old Elthamians		
2013–14	Saracens		
2014-15	Oyonnax		
2015–17	Bath Academy		
Senior career
Years	Team	Apps	(Points)
2017–2020	Bath	38	(10)
2020–21	Wasps	13	(5)
2021	Toulon	3	(0)
2021-2023	FC Grenoble	30	(10)
2023-2024	Urayasu D-Rocks	12	(15)
2024-2025	Biarritz	16	(0)
2025-	Dragons	12	(0)

Levi Samuel G. Douglas (born 1 September 1995 in England) is a rugby union player for Dragons RFC.
