= Ruairidh Campbell =

- Born: Ruairidh Campbell; 17 March 1998 (age 28) Scotland
- Height: 178 cm (5 ft 10 in)
- Weight: 70 kg (154 lb)
- School: Merchiston Castle School
- University: University of Glasgow
- Occupation: Rugby union referee

Rugby union career
- Position: Wing
Refereeing career
Years	Competition	Apps
2016-	Scottish Premiership	
2019-	Super 6	

Ruairidh Campbell (born 1998) is a Scottish professional rugby union referee who represents the Scottish Rugby Union.

== Rugby union career ==
=== Referee career ===
==== Professional career ====
He has refereed in the Scottish Premiership. He refereed 52 matches in season 2018-19 and won the Crabbies Referee of the Season award.

He refereed in the Amsterdam Sevens in 2018.

He refereed his first Super 6 match on 24 November 2019; Watsonians v Stirling County.

Campbell is part of the Borders Rugby Referee Society and the SRU panel.

==== International career ====
Campbell refereed the U18 match between Ireland and English Counties in April 2019.

Campell has been Assistant Referee for the Lithuania v Switzerland match.

== Outside of rugby ==
Campbell has written various articles for the Scottish Rugby Blog. He is a keen runner and runs for the University of Glasgow.
