= Daniel Kasende =

Congolese rugby union player

- Full name: Daniel Kasende
- Born: 9 May 1995 (age 31) Kinshasa, DR Congo
- Height: 1.87 m (6 ft 1 1/2 in)
- Weight: 92 kg (203 lb)
- School: Queens High School
- University: University of the Witwatersrand

Rugby union career
- Position: Wing / Fullback
- Current team: Ospreys / Ospreys
Senior career
Years	Team	Apps	(Points)
2020–2021	Griquas	16	(20)
2021-2024	Free State Cheetahs	10	(20)
2023-	Ospreys	38	(50)
- Correct as of 10 July 2022

Daniel Kasende is a Congolese rugby union player for the Lions in the United Rugby Championship. His regular position is wing or fullback. The Ospreys announced that Dan Kasende would be joining the team on a permanent deal from the Toyota Cheetahs in October 2024.

Kasende was named in the team for the first round of Super Rugby Unlocked against Bulls, making his debut in the process.
