= Oli Burrows =

Welsh rugby union player

- Born: 16 May 2002 (age 24)
- Height: 1.88 m (6 ft 2 in)
- Weight: 113 kg (17 st 11 lb)
- School: Dwr-y-Felin Comprehensive School, Millfield School
- University: University of Exeter

Rugby union career
- Position: Hooker
- Current team: Dragons
Senior career
Years	Team	Apps	(Points)
2021-2024	Exeter Chiefs		
2023-2024	→ Cornish Pirates (loan)		
2024-	Dragons	26	(25)
International career
Years	Team	Apps	(Points)
- Wales U18
- Wales U20

Oliver Burrows (born 16 May 2002) is a Welsh professional rugby union footballer who plays for Dragons RFC. His preferred position is Hooker.

== Early life ==
From Neath, Burrows was educated at Dwr-y-Felin Comprehensive School-Felin Comprehensive School]], before gaining a scholarship to attend Millfield in Somerset, prior to studying for a degree in International Business Management at the University of Exeter.

== Club career ==
Burrows played in the youth set-up at Ospreys prior to joining Exeter Chiefs in 2020. Burrows made his senior debut for Exeter in the Premiership Rugby Cup against Bristol Bears in 2021. He started for Exeter in their opening two group games in the Premiership Rugby Cup during the 2022-23 season, also appearing in the Rugby Premiership for the club. He joined Cornish Pirates on loan in September 2023.

Burrows signed for Dragons RFC ahead of the 2024-25 season. As well as playing for the club in the European Challenge Cup, his performances for Dragons included a man-of-the-match award against Scarlets in the United Rugby Championship on 1 January 2026.

== International career ==
Burrows represented Wales at under-18 level prior to playing for the Wales national under-20 rugby union team.
