= Aneurin Owen (rugby union) =

Welsh rugby union player

- Born: 19 October 2000 (age 26) Newport, Wales
- Height: 1.80 m (5 ft 11 in)
- Weight: 89 kg (14.0 st; 196 lb)
- School: Ysgol Gyfun Gwynllyw

Rugby union career
- Position: Centre
Senior career
Years	Team	Apps	(Points)
2020–	Dragons	42	(15)
- Correct as of 11:59, 6 February 2024 (UTC)
International career
Years	Team	Apps	(Points)
2019–	Wales U20	11	(5)
- Correct as of 20 December 2020

Aneurin Owen (born 19 October 2000) is a Welsh rugby union player, currently playing for URC side Dragons. His preferred position is centre.

== Dragons ==
Owen was named in the Dragons first-team squad for the 2020–21 Pro14 season. He made his Dragons debut in Round 2 of the 2020–21 European Rugby Champions Cup against Bordeaux Bègles.
