= Shane Lewis-Hughes =

Welsh rugby union player (born 1997)

- Born: Shane Lewis-Hughes; 20 September 1997 (age 29) Tylorstown, Wales
- Height: 193 cm (6 ft 4 in)
- Weight: 114 kg (251 lb)

Rugby union career
- Position(s): Lock; Blindside Flanker
- Current team: Dragons
Senior career
Years	Team	Apps	(Points)
2017–2024	Cardiff	70	(15)
2024–	Dragons	37	(20)
- Correct as of 19 October 2024
International career
Years	Team	Apps	(Points)
2016–2017	Wales U20	17	(15)
2020–	Wales	3	(0)
- Correct as of 25 October 2023

Shane Lewis-Hughes (born 20 September 1997) is a Welsh rugby union player who plays for Dragons as a flanker or lock. He is a Wales under-20 international.

Lewis-Hughes made his debut for Cardiff in 2017 having come through the organisation's academy featuring for both Pontypridd RFC and Cardiff RFC.

== International ==
Lewis-Hughes was named in the Wales squad for the first time for the uncapped international versus the Barbarians on 30 November 2019. He was also named in the Wales squad for the game against Scotland on 31 October 2020 in Wales' final delayed 2020 Six Nations match. He made his debut in the number 6 shirt.
