= Alex Soroka =

Irish rugby union player

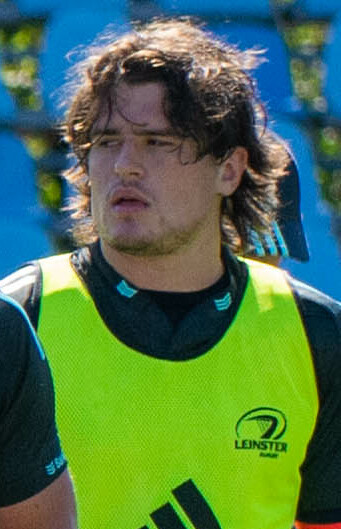
- Soroka in 2022
- Born: 19 February 2001 (age 25) Cork, Ireland
- Height: 1.96 m (6 ft 5 in)
- Weight: 105 kg (231 lb; 16 st 7 lb)
- School: Belvedere College

Rugby union career
- Position: Flanker
Senior career
Years	Team	Apps	(Points)
2021–	Leinster	24	(15)
- Correct as of 19 December 2025
International career
Years	Team	Apps	(Points)
2020	Ireland U20s	2	(5)
2025	Ireland A	2	(0)
- Correct as of 8 November 2025

Alex Soroka (born 19 February 2001) is an Irish rugby union player, playing for Leinster Rugby in the United Rugby Championship and European Rugby Champions Cup, and representing Clontarf in the All-Ireland League. His preferred position is flanker.

== Leinster ==
Soroka played under-age rugby with Clontarf F.C. He was named in the Leinster academy for the 2020–21 season. He made his Leinster debut in Round 13 of the 2020–21 Pro14 against Glasgow Warriors. Leinster Rugby announced his first senior contract with the club on 20 April 2023.

== Personal life ==
Soroka was born in Cork to Ukrainian parents, Tanya and Vassyl. He has an older brother, Ivan, who also plays for Clontarf F.C., and a younger sister, Dasha. With his extended family living in Ukraine, following the 2022 Russian invasion of Ukraine, Soroka has been involved in fundraising for Okhmadits Children's Hospital in Kyiv, the largest children's hospital in Ukraine. His fundraising efforts were backed by his Leinster teammates. As of January 2023, his GoFundMe has raised over €64,000.
