= David Richards (rugby union, born 1999) =

Welsh rugby union player

- Born: David Richards; 30 July 1999 (age 27) Cwmbran, Wales
- Height: 1.82 m (6 ft 0 in)
- Weight: 93 kg (205 lb; 14 st 9 lb)
- School: Monmouth School

Rugby union career
- Position: Fullback
- Current team: Dragons, Newport
Senior career
Years	Team	Apps	(Points)
2018–	Newport	45	(50)
2022–2024, 2025-	Dragons	4	(10)
- Correct as of 8 July 2025

David Richards (born 30 July 1999) is a Welsh professional rugby union player who plays as a fullback for the Dragons.

== Club career ==
=== Early life and amateur rugby ===
Richards attended Monmouth School, and came through the Dragons academy. Richards played for Newport RFC, and was named Player of the Match in their 2022 Premiership Cup win.

=== Dragons ===
Richards was named in the Dragons first team for the 2021–22 season, as was added to their European squad in January 2022. He made his debut for the Dragons in Round 5 of the 2021–22 EPCR Challenge Cup against Gloucester.

He made his first start against Zebre in the United Rugby Championship on 29 October 2022. During the match, Richards scored two tries and was subsequently named Player of the Match. Richards started the following match against the Lions, but suffered a hamstring injury and was ruled out for the remainder of the season.

Ahead of the 2023–24 United Rugby Championship season, Richards signed a contract extension with the Dragons.

During the off-season, Richards was sidelined with a back injury, and he sustained a recurrence of the hamstring injury on his return match for Newport RFC.

Richards was released by the Dragons, and joined Newport on a full contract ahead of the 2024–25 season.
