= Siba Mahashe =

South African rugby union player

- Full name: Sibabalwe Mahashe
- Born: 11 April 2004 (age 22) South Africa
- Height: 187 cm (6 ft 2 in)
- Weight: 93 kg (205 lb; 14 st 9 lb)
- School: Hudson Park High School

Rugby union career
- Position: Flanker / Number 8
- Current team: Lions
Senior career
Years	Team	Apps	(Points)
2026–	Lions	17	(30)
- Correct as of 3 November 2026
International career
Years	Team	Apps	(Points)
2024	South Africa U20	7	(20)
- Correct as of 1 March 2026

Siba Mahashe (born 11 April 2004) is a South African rugby union player, who plays for the Lions. His preferred position is flanker or number 8.

== Early career ==
Mahashe is from South Africa and attended Hudson Park High School. His performances earned him selection for the Border side at Craven Week in 2022, earning him selection for the South Africa Schools side in 2022, captaining the side on two occasions. He joined up with the Lions academy in 2023, being named in the SA Rugby academy in 2023, and captained the Lions U21 in 2024 and 2025. In 2024, he earned selection for the South Africa U20 side.

== Professional career ==
Mahashe joined up with the Lions first team in early 2026, being named as an additional player for the 2025–26 EPCR Challenge Cup. He would debut for the Lions in Round 3 against Lyon. He would then debut in the URC against the Sharks scoring on his league debut.
