= Brodie Coghlan =

Wales international rugby union player (born 2000)

- Born: 21 December 2000 (age 25) Newport, Wales
- Height: 185 cm (6 ft 1 in)
- Weight: 112 kg (17 st 9 lb)
- School: Newport High School

Rugby union career
- Position: Hooker
- Current team: Dragons
Senior career
Years	Team	Apps	(Points)
2019–2024	Newport	7	(10)
2021–2022	→ RGC 1404 (loan)		
2022–	Dragons	45	(20)
International career
Years	Team	Apps	(Points)
2019	Wales U19		
2025–	Wales	2	

Brodie Coghlan (born 21 December 2000) is a Welsh professional rugby union player who plays as a hooker for Dragons RFC.

== Early life ==
Coglan is from Newport, Wales. He played for Newport RFC in the Welsh Premier Division, and for RGC 1404 on loan. Coghlan was named as man of the match on his first start for Newport, in a win against Llandovery RFC.

== Club career ==
=== Dragons ===
Coghlan made his Dragons debut against the Lions in a 31-31 European Challenge Cup draw in Johannesburg in December 2022.

He made his first start for Dragons in the United Rugby Championship against Glasgow Warriors in January 2023. Coghlan signed an academy contract with the Dragons in April 2023.

He continued to play for Dragons in the United Rugby Championship during the 2023–24 season. He received plaudits for his play after starting the 2024–25 season as Dragons first choice hooker.

== International career ==
=== Wales U19 and U20 ===
In 2019, he played for Wales U19.

Coghlan was selected for Wales U20 for the 2020 Six Nations Under 20s Championship, but did not feature for the side.

=== Wales ===
In October 2025, he was named in the senior Wales squad for the 2025 end-of-year rugby union internationals.

He made his debut on 22 November 2025, off the bench against New Zealand. Coghlan came off the bench against South Africa.
