= 2024–25 Leinster Rugby season =

Leinster Rugby
- Full name: Leinster Rugby
- Union: Irish Rugby Football Union
- Founded: 1879; 147 years ago
- Location: Dublin, Ireland
- Ground(s): RDS Arena (Capacity: 18,500); Aviva Stadium (Capacity: 51,700); Croke Park (Capacity: 82,000)
- Coach: Leo Cullen
- Captain(s): Caelan Doris; Jack Conan
- League(s): United Rugby Championship (2024–25); European Champions Cup (2024–25)
- (2024–25): ERCC : semi-final URC : 1st (ladder) finalist (play-offs); Irish Shield: winner
1st kit	2nd kit	3rd kit

Official website
- www.leinsterrugby.ie

The 2024–25 season was Leinster Rugby's fourth season in the United Rugby Championship (URC), their 31st season of professional rugby and their 137th season of representative rugby since their foundation. Along with competing in the URC and its Irish Shield competition, the club also participated in the 2024-25 European Rugby Champions Cup.

In the latter competition, seeking a record fourth successive final, Leinster suffered a shock home defeat in the semi-final to Northampton Saints, ending their run of final appearances. In the URC, however, they reached their first final in the new format, against Bulls of Pretoria. They reached the play-offs as top seeds from the regular season, and retained their Irish Shield title for the fourth time. In the final, they overcame second seed Bulls 32-7 to win the championship for a record ninth time.

In the women's game, Leinster retained their Interprovincial Series title despite a loss to Munster Women, and supplied the bulk of the players to the Wolfhounds franchise that retained their Celtic Challenge title.

Leinster Rugby drew an average home attendance of 26,930, one of the highest of all rugby union teams in the world.

== Leinster Men ==
=== Senior squad ===
Leinster Rugby United Rugby Championship squad (Note: Taking into account signings and departures head of 2023–24 season as listed on List of 2023–24 United Rugby Championship transfers.)
**Props**: (Ireland) Jack Boyle; (Ireland) **Tom Clarkson**; (Ireland) **Tadhg Furlong**; (Ireland) **Cian Healy**; (Ireland) Paddy McCarthy; (Ireland) Michael Milne; (Ireland) **Andrew Porter**; (France) **Rabah Slimani**; **Hookers**: (Ireland) Lee Barron; (Ireland) **Rónan Kelleher**; (Ireland) John McKee; (Ireland) **Dan Sheehan**; **Locks**: (Ireland) **Ryan Baird**; (Ireland) Brian Deeny; (Ireland) **Joe McCarthy**; (Ireland) **James Ryan**; (South Africa) **RG Snyman**	**Back row**: (Ireland) **Jack Conan**; (Ireland) **Will Connors**; (Ireland) James Culhane; (Ireland) **Max Deegan**; (Ireland) **Caelan Doris** (c); (Ireland) Scott Penny; (Ireland) Alex Soroka; (Ireland) **Josh van der Flier**; **Scrum-halves**: (Ireland) Cormac Foley; (Ireland) **Jamison Gibson-Park**; (Ireland) **Luke McGrath**; **Fly-halves**: (Ireland) **Harry Byrne**; (Ireland) **Ross Byrne**; (Ireland) **Ciarán Frawley**; (Ireland) **Sam Prendergast**	**Centres**: (New Zealand) **Jordie Barrett** ^{ST}; (Ireland) **Robbie Henshaw**; (Ireland) **Jamie Osborne**; (Ireland) **Garry Ringrose**; (Ireland) Liam Turner; **Wings**: (Ireland) **Jordan Larmour**; (Ireland) **James Lowe**; (Ireland) Tommy O'Brien; (Ireland) Rob Russell; **Fullbacks**: (Ireland) **Hugo Keenan**; (Ireland) **Jimmy O'Brien**
(c) denotes the team captain, **Bold** denotes internationally capped players.^{*} denotes players qualified to play for Ireland on residency or dual nationality.^{ST} denotes a short-term signing. Players and their allocated positions from the Leinster Rugby website.

=== Academy squad ===
Leinster Rugby Academy squad (Note: Taking into account signings and departures head of 2023–24 season as listed on List of 2023–24 United Rugby Championship transfers.)
**Props**: (Ireland) Rory McGuire **(3)**; (Ireland) Niall Smyth **(1)**; (Ireland) Andrew Sparrow **(1)**; (Ireland) Alex Usanov **(1)**; **Hookers**: (Ireland) **Gus McCarthy** **(2)**; (Ireland) Stephen Smyth **(1)**; **Locks**: (Ireland) Billy Corrigan **(1)**; (Ireland) Diarmuid Mangan **(3)**; (Ireland) Conor O'Tighearnaigh **(2)**; (Ireland) Alan Spicer **(1)**	**Back row**: (Ireland) Liam Molony **(2)**; **Scrum-halves**: (Ireland) Oliver Coffey **(1)**; (Ireland) Fintan Gunne **(2)**; **Fly-halves**: (Austria) Casper Gabriel **(1)**; (Ireland) Charlie Tector **(3)**	**Centres**: (Ireland) Ben Brownlee **(3)**; (Ireland) Hugh Cooney **(2)**; **Wings**: (Ireland) Aitzol King **(3)**; (Ireland) Hugo McLaughlin **(1)**; (Ireland) Ruben Moloney **(1)**; (Ireland) Andrew Osborne **(2)**; **Fullbacks**: (Ireland) Henry McErlean **(2)**
(c) denotes the team captain, **Bold** denotes internationally capped players.^{*} denotes players qualified to play for Ireland on residency or dual nationality. Players and their allocated positions from the Leinster Rugby website.

=== Management ===
Position	Name	Nationality
Head coach	Leo Cullen	Ireland
Senior Coach	Jacques Nienaber	South Africa
Assistant coach	Robin McBryde	Wales
Backs Coach	Tyler Bleyendaal	New Zealand
Contact Skills Coach	Sean O'Brien	Ireland
Kicking Coach & Head Analyst	Emmet Farrell	Ireland

== Transfers ==
=== Players in ===
- (South Africa) RG Snyman from (Ireland) Munster
- (New Zealand) Jordie Barrett from (New Zealand) Hurricanes (short-term deal)
- (Ireland) Jack Boyle promoted from Academy
- (Ireland) James Culhane promoted from Academy
- (Ireland) Paddy McCarthy promoted from Academy
- (France) Rabah Slimani from (France) Clermont

=== Players out ===
- (Samoa) Michael Alaalatoa to (France) Clermont
- (South Africa) Jason Jenkins to (South Africa) Sharks
- (Ireland) Ross Molony to (England) Bath
- (Ireland) Ed Byrne to (Wales) Cardiff
- (Ireland) Temi Lasisi to (Ireland) Connacht
- (Ireland) Ben Murphy to (Ireland) Connacht
- (Ireland) Rhys Ruddock retired
- (New Zealand) Charlie Ngatai released
- (Ireland) Martin Moloney to (England) Exeter Chiefs
- (Ireland) Harry Byrne to (England) Bristol Bears (short-term loan)
- (Ireland) Lee Barron to (Ireland) Munster (on loan)
- (Ireland) Michael Milne to (Ireland) Munster (on loan)

== United Rugby Championship ==
=== Table ===
Pos	Team	Pld	W	D	L	PF	PA	PD	TF	TA	TB	LB	Pts	Qualification
1	Leinster (CH)	18	16	0	2	542	256	+286	79	35	11	1	76	Qualifies for home URC quarter-final; Qualification for the 2025–26 Champions Cup
2	Bulls (RU)	18	14	0	4	542	361	+181	71	44	9	3	68	Qualifies for home URC quarter-final; Qualification for the 2025–26 Champions Cup
3	Sharks	18	13	0	5	436	402	+34	55	59	7	3	62	Qualifies for home URC quarter-final; Qualification for the 2025–26 Champions Cup
4	Glasgow Warriors	18	11	0	7	468	327	+141	70	40	10	5	59	Qualifies for home URC quarter-final; Qualification for the 2025–26 Champions Cup
5	Stormers	18	10	0	8	507	418	+89	66	57	11	4	55	Qualifies for URC quarter-final; Qualification for the 2025–26 Champions Cup
6	Munster	18	9	0	9	444	429	+15	67	59	11	4	51	Qualifies for URC quarter-final; Qualification for the 2025–26 Champions Cup
7	Edinburgh	18	8	1	9	471	407	+64	66	57	9	6	49	Qualifies for URC quarter-final; Qualification for the 2025–26 Champions Cup
8	Scarlets	18	9	1	8	427	382	+45	50	52	6	4	48	Qualifies for URC quarter-final; Qualification for the 2025–26 Champions Cup
9	Cardiff	18	8	1	9	409	477	−68	63	65	10	3	47	Qualification for the 2025–26 Challenge Cup
10	Benetton	18	9	1	8	393	478	−85	50	65	7	1	46	Qualification for the 2025–26 Challenge Cup
11	Lions	18	8	0	10	402	440	−38	53	60	5	3	40	Qualification for the 2025–26 Challenge Cup
12	Ospreys	18	7	1	10	437	454	−17	60	63	6	4	40	Qualification for the 2025–26 Challenge Cup
13	Connacht	18	6	0	12	420	472	−52	64	62	9	6	39	Qualification for the 2025–26 Challenge Cup
14	Ulster	18	7	0	11	414	506	−92	59	72	5	5	38	Qualification for the 2025–26 Challenge Cup
15	Zebre Parma	18	5	1	12	302	503	−201	38	72	3	4	29	Qualification for the 2025–26 Challenge Cup
16	Dragons	18	1	0	17	335	637	−302	43	92	1	4	9	Qualification for the 2025–26 Challenge Cup

Source: UnitedRugby.com
Rules for classification: Tiebreakers for teams tied on points: 1) Number of matches won 2) The difference between points for and points against 3) The number of tries scored 4) The most points scored 5) The difference between tries for and tries against 6) The fewest red cards received 7) The fewest yellow cards received.

=== Fixtures ===
20 September 2024	(2 BP) Edinburgh (Scotland)	31–33	(Ireland) Leinster (1 BP)	Hive Stadium, Edinburgh
19:35	Try: Schoeman 11' c van der Merwe (2) 32' m, 66' m Cherry 42' c M. Scott 80' c Con: Thompson (2/3) 11', 43'; Healy 81' (1/2)		Try: T. O'Brien 15' m Tector 26' c Larmour 46' c Gibson-Park 53' c Conan 56' c Con: Prendergast (4/5) 27', 47', 54', 58'	Attendance: 7,774; Referee: Andrea Piardi (Italy)

27 September 2024	(1 BP) Leinster (Ireland)	34–6	(Wales) Dragons	Aviva Stadium, Dublin
19:35	Try: Conan 17' m R. Byrne 37' m Deegan 46' c McCarthy 64' m Larmour 68' c King 81' m Con: R. Byrne (2/6) 46', 65'		Pen: L. Evans (2/3) 25', 40'	Attendance: 18,397; Referee: Mike Adamson (Scotland)

5 October 2024	Benetton (Italy)	5–35	(Ireland) Leinster (1 BP)	Stadio Monigo, Treviso
18:15	Try: Manfredi 65' m		Try: Penalty try 9'; Frawley 11' c Conan 18' c Doris 25' c Barron 79' c Con: Frawley (3/3) 11', 19', 26'; R. Byrne (1/1) 80'	Attendance: 4,391; Referee: Craig Evans (Wales)

12 October 2024	(1 BP) Leinster (Ireland)	26–12	(Ireland) Munster	Croke Park, Dublin
17:45	Try: Lowe 5' c' Doris 10' c Keenan 14' c Snyman 40' m Con: Frawley (3/4) 6', 11', 15'		Try: O'Brien 34' m Haley 65' c Con: Crowley (1/2) 66'	Attendance: 80,468; Referee: Chris Busby (Ireland)

19 October 2024	Connacht (Ireland)	12–33	(Ireland) Leinster (1 BP)	The Sportsground, Galway
19:35	Try: O'Brien 33' m Forde 64' c Con: Ioane (1/2) 64'		Try: J. Osborne 5' c Turner 15' c Snyman 38' c Deegan 45' m A. Osborne 65' c Con: Frawley 6' (1/1); R. Byrne (3/4) 16', 40', 66'	Attendance: 6,117; Referee: Eoghan Cross (Ireland)

26 October 2024	Leinster (Ireland)	24–6	(South Africa) Lions	Aviva Stadium, Dublin
17:15	Try: van der Flier 31' c Doris 57' c Penalty try 80'+1; Con: Prendergast (2/2) 32', 58'; Pen: Prendergast 2'		Pen: Wolhuter (2) 12', 17'	Attendance: 20,945; Referee: Craig Evans (Wales)

29 November 2024	(1 BP) Ulster (Ireland)	20–27	(Ireland) Leinster (1 BP)	Ravenhill Stadium, Belfast
19:35	Try: Carson (2) 4' c, 55' c Con: Doak 6', 56' (2/2); Pen: Doak 12', 29' (2)		Try: McGrath 9' c Larmour 49' c J. O'Brien 59' m Culhane 72'm Con: R. Byrne (2/4) 10', 49'; Pen: R. Byrne 16'	Attendance: 16,491; Referee: Eoghan Cross (Ireland)

21 December 2024	Leinster (Ireland)	20–12	(Ireland) Connacht	Aviva Stadium, Dublin
17:30	Try: A. Osbourne 19' c Tector 26' c Con: R. Byrne (2/2) 19', 27'; Pen: R. Byrne (2) 42', 79'	Report	Try: Dowling 52' m Jennings 60' c Con: Forde (1/2) 60'	Attendance: 33,963; Referee: Chris Busby (Scotland)

27 December 2024	Munster (Ireland)	7–28	(Ireland) Leinster (1 BP)	Thomond Park, Limerick
19:35	Try: Ahern 44'; Con: Burns (1/1) 46'	Report	Try: McGrath 8'; Prendergast 32' van der Flier 53'; Doris 73'; Con: Prendergast (3/3) 9', 33', 53'; R. Byrne 74'	Attendance: 26,267

25 January 2025	Leinster (Ireland)	36–12	(South Africa) Stormers	Aviva Stadium, Dublin
17:00	Try: A. Osbourne (2) 10' c, 67' c Sheehan (2) 40' m, 61' c Barrett 57' c Con: R. Byrne (4/5) 11', 58', 62', 68'; Pen: R. Byrne 3'		Try: Loader 20' c Roos 78' m Con: Libbok (1/1) 21'	Attendance: 18,892

14 February 2025	(1 BP) Ospreys (Wales)	19–22	(Ireland) Leinster	Swansea.com Stadium, Swansea
19:35	Try: Deaves, 35c Lewis, 47'; Jones, 73'c Con: Williams; Walsh	Report	Try: McGrath, 12; Tector, 38'c Slimani, 64'c Con: Frawley; R Byrne; Pen: Frawley, 16'	Attendance: 3,500

1 March 2025	(1 BP) Leinster (Ireland)	42–24	(Wales) Cardiff (1BP)	Aviva Stadium, Dublin
15:00	Try: McKee 14'; Boyle 40'; Deegan 42'; McGrath 50'; Tector 53'; Russell 75'; Con: R. Byrne (6)	Report	Try: Millard (2) 17', 57'; Young 29'; Bevan 69'; Con: Sheedy; De Beer	Attendance: 17,951; Referee: Andrea Piardi

22 March 2025	Bulls (South Africa)	21–20	(Ireland) Leinster (1 BP)	Loftus Versfeld Stadium, Pretoria
17:00	Try: penalty try 57'; Grobbelaar 70'; Pen: Johannes 2', 40'; Kriel 80+4'	Report	Try: Barrett 3'c Osborne 43'c Con: R. Byrne (2) 4', 44'; Pen: R. Byrne 17', 77'	Attendance: 15,299; Referee: Ben Whitehouse

29 March 2025	(1 BP) Sharks (South Africa)	7–10	(Ireland) Leinster	Kings Park Stadium, Durban
19:15	Try: Mbonambi 52'; Con: Hendrikse 53'	Report:ESPN; Report:The Citizen	Try: McErlean 19'; Penny 48'	Attendance: 28,229

19 April 2025	(1 BP) Leinster (Ireland)	41–17	(Ireland) Ulster	Aviva Stadium, Dublin
19:35	Try: O'Brien 20'; Clarkson 27'; Penalty try 33'; Ringrose 42'; Sheehan (3) 58', 69', 78'; Con: Frawley 28'; Prendergast 70'	Reports:1; 2	Try: Izuchukwu 36'; McCann 73'; Con: Murphy 37', 74'; Pen: Murphy 8'	Attendance: 18,422; Referee: Gianluca Gnecchi

26 April 2025	(1 BP) Scarlets (Wales)	35–22	(Ireland) Leinster	Parc y Scarlets, Llanelli
17:15	Try: Davies 9'; Rogers 22'; Plumtree 30'; Roberts 42'; Con: Costelow (3) 9', 31', 43'; Pen: Costelow 13'; Lloyd (2) 55' 79'		Try: J. Osborne 24'; Mangan 35'; Culhane 48'; Con: Byrne (2) 25', 49'; Pen: Byrne 18'	Attendance: 7,381; Referee: Mike Adamson

10 May 2025	(1 BP) Leinster (Ireland)	76–5	(Italy) Zebre Parma	Aviva Stadium, Dublin
17:15	Try: Kelleher 3'; McGrath 5'; Baird 18'; Barrett (2) 25', 30'; Lowe 40'; Prendergast 43'; Van der Flier 48'; J. Osborne (2) 55', 80'; Frawley 60'; Culhane 76'; Con: Prendergast (6) 4', 19', 26', 30', 44', 50'; Frawley (2) 76', 80+1'	Report	Try: Garcia 66'	Attendance: 14,681

17 May 2025	Leinster (Ireland)	13–5	(Scotland) Glasgow Warriors	Aviva Stadium, Dublin
19:35	Try: O'Brien 27'; Con: Prendergast 28'; Pen: Prendergast 54'; Frawley 79'	Report	Try: Horne 56'	Attendance: 17,654

=== Play-offs ===
With top spot in the regular season, Leinster claimed home field advantage for the duration of the play-offs.

==== Bracket ====
Quarter-finals
1	(Ireland) Leinster	33
8	(Wales) Scarlets	21
4	(Scotland) Glasgow Warriors	36
5	(South Africa) Stormers	18
3	(South Africa) Sharks	24 ^{(6)}
6	(Ireland) Munster	24 ^{(4)}
2	(South Africa) Bulls	42
7	(Scotland) Edinburgh	33

Semi-finals
1	(Ireland) Leinster	37
4	(Scotland) Glasgow Warriors	19
2	(South Africa) Bulls	25
3	(South Africa) Sharks	13

Final
1	(Ireland) Leinster	32
2	(South Africa) Bulls	7

==== Quarter final ====
In the quarter-finals, Leinster faced the eighth-seeded Scarlets.

31 May 2025	Leinster (Ireland)	33–21	(Wales) Scarlets	Aviva Stadium, Dublin
15:00	Try: Lowe 5'; Gibson-Park 10'; Osborne 46'; Keenan 60'; Con: Prendergast (2) 10', 46'; Pen: Prendergast (3) 36', 66', 74'	Report	Try: Rogers 20'; Murray 41'; J. Williams 71'; Con: Costelow (2) 21', 42'; Lloyd 71'; Cards: Hepburn (yellow card) 56'; Fifita (yellow card) 73'	Attendance: 12,879

==== Semi-final ====
Leinster were drawn to meet reigning champions Glasgow Warriors in the semi-final.

7 June 2025	Leinster (Ireland)	37–19	(Scotland) Glasgow Warriors	Aviva Stadium, Dublin
	Try: Sheehan (2) 3', 41'; Osborne (2) 28', 54'; Clarkson 33'; Frawley 58'; Con: Prendergast (2/6) 4', 55'; Pen: Prendergast (1/2) 23'	Report, 2	Try: Horne 5'; Dobie 72'; Tuipulotu 79'; Con: Jordan (2/2) 72', 79'	Attendance: 15,762

==== Grand Final ====
For the first time since it became the United Rugby Championship, the highest seeded team made the final, and faced the second seed, as all six knockout matches were won by the team with home advantage. Leinster hosted the Bulls in Croke Park, the first URC final to be held outside South Africa, and the first appearance of Leinster in a final since the format began. Bulls reached a record third final. Both teams needed their first URC title, although it would be Leinster's ninth total championship in all formats of the competition. and their twelfth play-off Grand Final, while the Bulls carried three championships from their previous competition, Super Rugby. This final was the first between the two teams.

In their previous meeting this season, in Round 13, Bulls inflicted the first defeat of the season across all competitions on Leinster, 21–20 in Pretoria. In all previous URC meetings going back to 2021, Bulls lead Leinster four wins to two, including both previous play-off meetings.

In the final, Leinster proved much too strong for the Bulls in wet conditions, racing to a 19–0 lead at half time. A Bulls try early in the second half briefly raised hopes of a comeback, but Leinster saw out a dominant win with a further try and two penalties, confirming a 32–7 win for their ninth championship in total. The Bulls were consigned to a third URC final defeat in four years.

14 June 2025	Leinster (Ireland)	32–7	(South Africa) Bulls	Croke Park, Dublin
	Try: Conan 6'; Barrett 14'; Van der Flier 23'; Gunne 73'; Con: Prendergast 7', 14'; Byrne 74'; Pen: Prendergast 45', 68'		Try: Van der Merwe 51'; Con: Goosen 51'	Attendance: 46,127; Referee: Andrea Piardi (Italy)

=== URC Irish Shield ===
Leinster won their record fourth Irish Shield title.

2024–25 United Rugby Championship Regional Shield Pools
(Ireland) Irish Shield
	Team	P	W	D	L	PF	PA	PD	TF	TA	TBP	LBP	Pts	Pos overall
1	(Ireland) Leinster (S)	6	6	0	0	175	80	+95	26	11	5	0	29	1
2	(Ireland) Munster	6	4	0	2	144	150	–6	22	22	4	0	20	6
3	(Ireland) Ulster	6	2	0	4	125	162	–37	16	26	1	2	11	14
4	(Ireland) Connacht	6	0	0	6	115	167	–52	18	23	3	3	6	13
If teams are level at any stage, tiebreakers are applied in the following order: 1. number of matches won 2. the difference between points for and points against 3. the number of tries scored 4. the most points scored 5. the difference between tries for and tries against 6. the fewest red cards received 7. the fewest yellow cards received
Green background indicates teams currently leading the regional shield. Upon the conclusion of the regular season, these teams win their respective regional shields. (S) : URC Shield champion

== European Rugby Champions Cup ==
European Rugby Champions Cup Pool 2
Pos	Team	Pld	W	D	L	PF	PA	PD	TF	TA	TB	LB	Pts	Qualification
1	(Ireland) Leinster (2)	4	4	0	0	113	54	+59	15	7	2	0	18	Home Champions Cup round of 16
2	(France) La Rochelle (8)	4	2	0	2	98	75	+23	12	6	1	2	11	Home Champions Cup round of 16
3	(Italy) Benetton (11)	4	2	0	2	83	109	−26	11	14	2	1	11	Away Champions Cup round of 16
4	(France) Clermont (14)	4	2	0	2	89	81	+8	13	12	2	0	10	Away Champions Cup round of 16
5	(England) Bath (10CC)	4	1	0	3	102	114	−12	14	16	1	2	7	Away Challenge Cup round of 16
6	(England) Bristol Bears	4	1	0	3	80	132	−52	12	20	2	1	7	

Source: EPCR
Rules for classification: Tiebreakers for teams tied on points: 1) Number of matches won; 2) Difference between points for and against; 3) Total number of points for; 4) Aggregate number of points scored in matches between tied teams; 5) Number of matches won excluding the first match, then the second and so on until the tie is settled.

=== Pool stage ===
8 December 2024	Bristol Bears (England)	12–35	(Ireland) Leinster (1 BP)	Ashton Gate, Bristol
17:30	Try: Lahiff 29' c Ibitoye 72' m Con: Janse van Rensburg (1/2) 31'	Report	Try: Larmour 32' c Prendergast (2) 52' c, 57' c Barrett 55' c van der Flier 63' c Con: Prendergast (5/5) 33', 52', 56', 58', 64'	Attendance: 15,680; Referee: Pierre Brousset (France)

14 December 2024	Leinster (Ireland)	15–7	(France) Clermont	Aviva Stadium, Dublin (Note: Leinster relocated their home fixtures for the 2024–25 season to the Aviva Stadium, due to ongoing redevelopment work taking place at the RDS Arena – the club's usual home ground.)
17:30	Try: Ringrose 21' c Barrett 25' m Con: Prendergast (1/2) 22'; Pen: Prendergast (1/1) 48'	Report	Try: Raka 4' c Con: Jauneau (1/1) 5'	Attendance: 34,184; Referee: Luke Pearce (England)

12 January 2025	(1 BP) La Rochelle (France)	14–16	(Ireland) Leinster	Stade Marcel-Deflandre, La Rochelle
15:15	Try: Leyds 65' m Pen: Hastoy (3/5) 3', 25', 59'	Report	Try: J. McCarthy 29' c Con: Prendergast (1/1) 30'; Pen: Prendergast (3/3) 10', 50', 54'	Attendance: 16,700; Referee: Nika Amashukeli (Georgia)

18 January 2025	(1 BP) Leinster (Ireland)	47–21	(England) Bath	Aviva Stadium, Dublin
17:30	Try: Henshaw (2) 9' m, 15' c Conan 36' c Snyman (2) 51' c, 76' c Ringrose 60' c Gibson-Park 67' c Con: Prendergast (6/7) 15', 37', 52', 61', 68', 76'	Report	Try: Barbeary 1' c de Glanville (2) 6' c, 39' c Con: Russell (3/3) 2', 7', 40'	Attendance: 40,195; Referee: Luc Ramos (France)

=== Knockout stage ===
==== Bracket ====
Round of 16
1	(France) Bordeaux Bègles	43
16	(Ireland) Ulster	31
8	(France) La Rochelle	24
9	(Ireland) Munster	25
4	(France) Toulon	72
13	(England) Saracens	42
5	(France) Toulouse	38
12	(England) Sale Sharks	15
2	(Ireland) Leinster	62
15	(England) Harlequins	0
7	(Scotland) Glasgow Warriors	43
10	(England) Leicester Tigers	19
3	(England) Northampton Saints	46
14	(France) Clermont	24
6	(France) Castres	39
11	(Italy) Benetton	37

Quarter-finals
1	(France) Bordeaux Bègles	47
9	(Ireland) Munster	29
4	(France) Toulon	18
5	(France) Toulouse	21
2	(Ireland) Leinster	52
7	(Scotland) Glasgow Warriors	0
3	(England) Northampton Saints	51
6	(France) Castres	16

Semi-finals
1	(France) Bordeaux Bègles	35
5	(France) Toulouse	18
2	(Ireland) Leinster	34
3	(England) Northampton Saints	37

Final
1	(France) Bordeaux Bègles	28
3	(England) Northampton Saints	20

==== Round of 16 ====
Leinster finished as the second highest ranked side in the pool stages of the Champions Cup, winning home field advantage for every round of the competition until the final (held in a predetermined neutral venue, this year the Principality Stadium, Cardiff). In the round of 16, they face the 15th seeded London based Harlequins. In January, it was announced the game had been moved from Leinster's 2024-25 seasonal home of the Aviva Stadium to the 82,000 capacity Croke Park, following a similar decision in respect of the URC match with Munster, the Aviva being unavailable on that weekend.

5 April 2025	Leinster (Ireland) (2)	62–0	(15) (England) Harlequins	Croke Park, Dublin
15:00	Try: Prendergast 14'; McCarthy 17'; Osborne 27'; Van der Flier 44'; Ringrose 47'; Sheehan 58'; Penalty try 66'; Byrne 71'; Lowe (2) 77', 80'; Con: Prendergast (3); Byrne	Report:EPCR		Attendance: 55,627; Referee: Pierre Brousset (France)

==== Quarter-final ====
In the round of 16, Leinster had become the first team in the history of the competition to prevent their opponents from scoring any points in a knockout game. In the quarter-final a week later, they repeated the feat, becoming the only club to record back-to-back 'bagels' in the competition's history. By the end of the match, Leinster had not conceded a single point in 200 minutes – or two-and-a-half full matches – of European Champions Cup play (stretching from half-time in their group match against Bath), outscoring their opponents 144–0 in that period.

11 April 2025	Leinster (Ireland) (2)	52–0	(7) (Scotland) Glasgow Warriors	Aviva Stadium, Dublin
20:00	Try: Deegan (2) 13', 75'; Penalty try 22'; Lowe 24'; O'Brien 29'; Keenan 33'; Ringrose 46'; Sheehan 57'; Con: Prendergast (5) 14', 30', 34', 47', 58'	Report: EPRC		Attendance: 22,400; Referee: Luke Pearce (England)

==== Semi-final ====
After two-and-a-half matches without conceding a score, Leinster gave up a try to their English opponents within 10 minutes. Despite a second-half come-back, the English champions proved too durable, and gained revenge for defeat at the same stage last season, becoming the first away side to win a European Champions Cup semi-final since 2016, and ending Leinster's run of consecutive finals at three.

3 May 2025	Leinster (Ireland) (2)	34–37	(3) (England) Northampton Saints	Aviva Stadium, Dublin
17:30	Try: O'Brien 17'; Van der Flier (2) 25', 58'; Doris 46'; Lowe 69'; Con: Prendergast (3) 25', 47', 70'; Pen: Prendergast 13'	Report	Try: Freeman (3) 7', 35', 37'; Pollock 28'; Ramm 62'; Con: Smith (3) 8', 29, 63'; Pen: Smith (2) 22', 55'	Attendance: 42,207; Referee: Pierre Brousset (France)

== Leinster Women ==
=== 2024 IRFU Women's Interprovincial Series ===
==== Fixtures ====
10 August 2024	(1 BP) Leinster Women (Ireland)	38–19	(Ireland) Connacht	Donnybrook Stadium, Dublin
16:45	Try: Roberts; Whelan (2); Dalton; Tilly; Molloy; Con: Caughey (4)	Report	Try: Oviawe (2); McGonagle; Con: Fowley (2)

17 August 2024	(1 BP) Munster (Ireland)	32–21	(Ireland) Leinster Women	Musgrave Park, Cork
16:45	Try: Buttimer; Bennett; Ugwueru; Penalty try McInerney; Con: Flannery; Pen: Flannery		Try: Hughes; Dalton; Tarpey; Con: Caughey (2); Farrell

24 August 2024	Ulster (Ireland)	14–39	(Ireland) Leinster Women (1 BP)	Ravenhill Stadium, Belfast
16:45	Try: Hogan (2); Con: Moyles (2)	Report	Try: O'Connor; Campbell; Tarpey; Djougang; Tilly; Corri; Burke; Con: Farrell (2); Caughey

==== Table ====
Pos	Team	Pld	W	D	L	PF	PA	PD	TF	TA	TB	LB	Pts	Qualification or relegation
1	Munster Women	3	3	0	0	90	67	+23	15	11	3	0	15	Qualified for Interprovincial final
2	Leinster Women (C)	3	2	0	1	98	65	+33	16	10	2	0	10	Qualified for Interprovincial final
3	Connacht Women	3	0	1	2	68	92	−24	11	14	2	1	5	Qualified for third/fourth place final
4	Ulster Women	3	0	1	2	61	93	−32	9	16	1	1	4	Qualified for third/fourth place final

First match(es) will be played: Unknown. Source: Unknown
Rules for classification: 1) competition points; 2) match points difference; 3) match points for
(C) Champion

=== Finals day ===
Women's Interprovincial Final

31 August 2024	Munster (Ireland)	7–27	(Ireland) Leinster Women	Ravenhill Stadium, Belfast
16:45	Try: McInerney; Con: Flannery	Report	Try: Tarpey (2); Wafer; Con: Caughey (2); O'Brien; Pen: Caughey; O'Brien

== 2024–25 Celtic Challenge ==
Leinster were represented, along with Ulster, by the Wolfhounds franchise in this, the third season of the Celtic Challenge, and entered as champions from 2023-24.

The fixtures were announced on 20 November 2024.

22 December 2024	(1 BP) Wolfhounds (Ireland)	33–7	(Ireland) Clovers	Donnybrook Stadium, Dublin
16:00		Report		Referee: Paul Haycock

28 December 2024	(1 BP) Clovers (Ireland)	31–10	(Ireland) Wolfhounds	UCD Bowl, Dublin
12:00		Report

4 January 2025	(1 BP) Wolfhounds (Ireland)	48–7	(Scotland) Glasgow Warriors	Ravenhill Stadium, Belfast
14:30		Report

11 January 2025	Brython Thunder (Wales)	0–48	(Ireland) Wolfhounds (1 BP)	Parc y Scarlets, Llanelli
12:00		Report		Referee: Jack Davies

18 January 2025	(1 BP) Wolfhounds (Ireland)	57–5	(Wales) Brython Thunder	UCD Bowl, Dublin
13:30		Report		Referee: Oisin Quinn

1 February 2025	Glasgow Warriors (Scotland)	21–64	(Ireland) Wolfhounds (1 BP)	Scotstoun Stadium, Glasgow
11:30		Report

9 February 2025	Wolfhounds (Ireland)	21–15	(Wales) Gwalia Lightning (1 BP)	Musgrave Park, Cork
12:30		Report		Referee: Paudie Sheehan

22 February 2025	(1 BP) Edinburgh Rugby (Scotland)	22–31	(Ireland) Wolfhounds (1 BP)	Edinburgh Rugby Stadium, Edinburgh
14:00		Report		Referee: Sam O'Neil

1 March 2025	Gwalia Lightning (Wales)	17–48	(Ireland) Wolfhounds (1 BP)	CCB Centre for Sporting Excellence, Ystrad Mynach
12:00		Report		Referee: Will Goodwin

8 March 2025	(1 BP) Wolfhounds (Ireland)	102–0	(Scotland) Edinburgh Rugby	Donnybrook Stadium, Dublin
12:15		Report		Referee: Paul O'Connor

=== Table ===
Pos	Team	Pld	W	D	L	PF	PA	PD	TF	TA	TB	LB	Pts	
1	(Ireland) Wolfhounds (C)	10	9	0	1	462	125	+337	74	20	8	0	44	Champions
2	(Ireland) Clovers	10	8	1	1	415	146	+269	69	23	8	0	42	
3	(Wales) Gwalia Lightning	10	6	0	4	241	252	−11	36	40	6	1	31	
4	(Wales) Brython Thunder	10	3	0	7	154	402	−248	26	66	4	1	17	
5	(Scotland) Edinburgh Rugby	10	2	0	8	225	392	−167	38	64	5	2	15	
6	(Scotland) Glasgow Warriors	10	1	1	8	182	372	−190	29	59	3	1	10	

Updated to match(es) played on 12 January 2025. Source: celticrugbycomp.com
Rules for classification: Four points for a win, two points for a tie. One bonus point for scoring four or more tries in a match; one bonus point for losing by a margin of seven or less.
