= 2025 Six Nations Championship squads =

Rugby union competition squads

This is a list of the complete squads for the 2025 Six Nations Championship, an annual rugby union tournament contested by the national rugby teams of England, France, Ireland, Italy, Scotland and Wales. Ireland are the defending champions.

Note: Number of caps and players' ages are indicated as of 31 January 2025 – the tournament's opening day. For players added to a squad during the tournament, their caps and age are indicated as of the date of their call-up.

== England ==
On 14 January 2025, England head coach Steve Borthwick named a 36-player squad for the 2025 Six Nations Championship.

- Head coach: (England) Steve Borthwick

Player	Position	Date of birth (age)	Caps	Club/province
Luke Cowan-Dickie	Hooker	20 June 1993 (aged 31)	44	(England) Sale Sharks
Theo Dan	Hooker	26 December 2000 (aged 24)	16	(England) Saracens
Jamie George (vc)	Hooker	20 October 1990 (aged 34)	97	(England) Saracens
Fin Baxter	Prop	12 February 2002 (aged 22)	6	(England) Harlequins
Ellis Genge (vc)	Prop	16 February 1995 (aged 29)	62	(England) Bristol Bears
Joe Heyes	Prop	13 April 1999 (aged 25)	7	(England) Leicester Tigers
Asher Opoku-Fordjour	Prop	16 July 2004 (aged 20)	1	(England) Sale Sharks
Bevan Rodd	Prop	26 August 2000 (aged 24)	7	(England) Sale Sharks
Will Stuart	Prop	12 July 1996 (aged 28)	45	(England) Bath
Ollie Chessum	Lock	6 September 2000 (aged 24)	23	(England) Leicester Tigers
Alex Coles	Lock	21 September 1999 (aged 25)	7	(England) Northampton Saints
Maro Itoje (c)	Lock	28 October 1994 (aged 30)	88	(England) Saracens
George Martin	Lock	18 June 2001 (aged 23)	19	(England) Leicester Tigers
Chandler Cunningham-South	Back row	18 March 2003 (aged 21)	11	(England) Harlequins
Ben Curry	Back row	15 June 1998 (aged 26)	6	(England) Sale Sharks
Tom Curry	Back row	15 June 1998 (aged 26)	56	(England) Sale Sharks
Alex Dombrandt	Back row	29 April 1997 (aged 27)	20	(England) Harlequins
Ben Earl	Back row	7 January 1998 (aged 27)	37	(England) Saracens
Ted Hill	Back row	26 March 1999 (aged 25)	2	(England) Bath
Tom Willis	Back row	18 January 1999 (aged 26)	1	(England) Saracens
Alex Mitchell	Scrum-half	25 May 1997 (aged 27)	18	(England) Northampton Saints
Harry Randall	Scrum-half	18 December 1997 (aged 27)	11	(England) Bristol Bears
Jack van Poortvliet	Scrum-half	15 May 2001 (aged 23)	16	(England) Leicester Tigers
George Ford (vc)	Fly-half	16 March 1993 (aged 31)	98	(England) Sale Sharks
Fin Smith	Fly-half	11 May 2002 (aged 22)	6	(England) Northampton Saints
Marcus Smith	Fly-half	14 February 1999 (aged 25)	39	(England) Harlequins
Oscar Beard	Centre	20 November 2001 (aged 23)	0	(England) Harlequins
Fraser Dingwall	Centre	7 April 1999 (aged 25)	2	(England) Northampton Saints
Ollie Lawrence	Centre	18 September 1999 (aged 25)	31	(England) Bath
Henry Slade	Centre	19 March 1993 (aged 31)	70	(England) Exeter Chiefs
Tommy Freeman	Wing	5 March 2001 (aged 23)	16	(England) Northampton Saints
Cadan Murley	Wing	31 January 1999 (aged 26)	0	(England) Harlequins
Tom Roebuck	Wing	7 January 2001 (aged 24)	3	(England) Sale Sharks
Ollie Sleightholme	Wing	13 April 2000 (aged 24)	5	(England) Northampton Saints
Elliot Daly	Fullback	8 October 1992 (aged 32)	69	(England) Saracens
Freddie Steward	Fullback	5 December 2000 (aged 24)	35	(England) Leicester Tigers

=== Call-ups ===
On 21 January 2025, Arthur Clark, Curtis Langdon, Henry Pollock, Raffi Quirke and Ben Spencer were added to the training squad as injury cover.

On 4 February 2025, Alex Lozowski was called up to the squad, ahead of the second round of the tournament.

On 10 March 2025, Max Ojomoh was called up to the squad, ahead of the final round of the tournament.

Player	Position	Date of birth (age)	Caps	Club/province
Curtis Langdon	Hooker	3 August 1997 (aged 27)	2	(England) Northampton Saints
Arthur Clark	Lock	19 December 2001 (aged 23)	0	(England) Gloucester
Henry Pollock	Back row	14 January 2005 (aged 20)	0	(England) Northampton Saints
Raffi Quirke	Scrum-half	18 August 2001 (aged 23)	2	(England) Sale Sharks
Ben Spencer	Scrum-half	31 July 1992 (aged 32)	8	(England) Bath
Alex Lozowski	Centre	30 June 1993 (aged 31)	5	(England) Saracens
Max Ojomoh	Centre	14 September 2000 (aged 24)	0	(England) Bath

== France ==
On 15 January 2025, France coach Fabien Galthié named a 42-man squad for the 2025 Six Nations Championship.

Head coach: (France) Fabien Galthié

Player	Position	Date of birth (age)	Caps	Club/province
Maxime Lamothe	Hooker	3 October 1998 (aged 26)	0	(France) Bordeaux Bègles
Julien Marchand	Hooker	10 May 1995 (aged 29)	40	(France) Toulouse
Peato Mauvaka	Hooker	10 January 1997 (aged 28)	37	(France) Toulouse
Dorian Aldegheri	Prop	4 August 1993 (aged 31)	19	(France) Toulouse
Uini Atonio	Prop	26 March 1990 (aged 34)	63	(France) La Rochelle
Cyril Baille	Prop	15 September 1993 (aged 31)	52	(France) Toulouse
Giorgi Beria	Prop	11 November 1999 (aged 25)	0	(France) Perpignan
Georges-Henri Colombe	Prop	9 April 1998 (aged 26)	7	(France) La Rochelle
Jean-Baptiste Gros	Prop	29 May 1999 (aged 25)	32	(France) Toulon
Dany Priso	Prop	2 January 1994 (aged 31)	18	(France) Toulon
Rabah Slimani	Prop	18 October 1989 (aged 35)	57	(Ireland) Leinster
Hugo Auradou	Lock	20 July 2003 (aged 21)	1	(France) Pau
Joshua Brennan	Lock	28 November 2001 (aged 23)	0	(France) Toulouse
Thibaud Flament	Lock	29 April 1997 (aged 27)	29	(France) Toulouse
Matthias Halagahu	Lock	15 August 2001 (aged 23)	0	(France) Toulon
Emmanuel Meafou	Lock	12 July 1998 (aged 26)	5	(France) Toulouse
Romain Taofifénua	Lock	14 September 1990 (aged 34)	53	(France) Lyon
Esteban Abadie	Back row	1 February 1997 (aged 27)	1	(France) Toulon
Grégory Alldritt	Back row	23 March 1997 (aged 27)	51	(France) La Rochelle
Paul Boudehent	Back row	21 November 1999 (aged 25)	14	(France) La Rochelle
François Cros	Back row	25 March 1994 (aged 30)	34	(France) Toulouse
Marko Gazzotti	Back row	24 September 2004 (aged 20)	1	(France) Bordeaux Bègles
Oscar Jégou	Back row	31 May 2003 (aged 21)	1	(France) La Rochelle
Anthony Jelonch	Back row	28 July 1996 (aged 28)	29	(France) Toulouse
Antoine Dupont (c)	Scrum-half	15 November 1996 (aged 28)	55	(France) Toulouse
Nolann Le Garrec	Scrum-half	14 May 2002 (aged 22)	7	(France) Racing 92
Maxime Lucu	Scrum-half	12 January 1993 (aged 32)	24	(France) Bordeaux Bègles
Matthieu Jalibert	Fly-half	6 November 1998 (aged 26)	34	(France) Bordeaux Bègles
Romain Ntamack	Fly-half	1 May 1999 (aged 25)	37	(France) Toulouse
Pierre-Louis Barassi	Centre	22 April 1998 (aged 26)	3	(France) Toulouse
Nicolas Depoortère	Centre	13 January 2003 (aged 22)	2	(France) Bordeaux Bègles
Antoine Frisch	Centre	1 June 1996 (aged 28)	2	(France) Toulon
Émilien Gailleton	Centre	13 July 2003 (aged 21)	6	(France) Pau
Yoram Moefana	Centre	18 July 2000 (aged 24)	31	(France) Bordeaux Bègles
Noah Nene	Centre	14 October 2004 (aged 20)	0	(France) Dax
Théo Attissogbé	Wing	19 November 2004 (aged 20)	3	(France) Pau
Louis Bielle-Biarrey	Wing	16 June 2003 (aged 21)	14	(France) Bordeaux Bègles
Gaël Dréan	Wing	22 October 2000 (aged 24)	0	(France) Toulon
Damian Penaud	Wing	25 September 1996 (aged 28)	53	(France) Bordeaux Bègles
Gabin Villière	Wing	13 December 1995 (aged 29)	18	(France) Toulon
Léo Barré	Fullback	20 August 2002 (aged 22)	6	(France) Stade Français
Thomas Ramos	Fullback	23 July 1995 (aged 29)	39	(France) Toulouse

=== Call-ups ===
On 29 January 2025, Mickaël Guillard and Alexandre Roumat were added to the squad, ahead of the opening round of the tournament.

On 10 March 2025, Fabien Brau-Boirie and Baptiste Serin were called up to the squad as injury cover for the final round of the tournament, following the French skipper Antoine Dupont suffered torn cruciate ligaments in his right knee during the game against Ireland on March 8.

Player	Position	Date of birth (age)	Caps	Club/province
Mickaël Guillard	Lock	10 December 2000 (aged 24)	5	(France) Lyon
Alexandre Roumat	Back row	27 June 1997 (aged 27)	7	(France) Toulouse
Baptiste Serin	Scrum-half	20 June 1994 (aged 30)	46	(France) Toulon
Fabien Brau-Boirie	Centre	19 December 2005 (aged 19)	0	(France) Pau

== Ireland ==
On 15 January 2025, Ireland interim head coach Simon Easterby named a 36-player squad for the 2025 Six Nations Championship.

- Head coach: (Ireland) Simon Easterby (interim)

Player	Position	Date of birth (age)	Caps	Club/province
Rob Herring	Hooker	27 April 1990 (aged 34)	43	(Ireland) Ulster
Rónan Kelleher	Hooker	24 January 1998 (aged 27)	39	(Ireland) Leinster
Gus McCarthy	Hooker	23 July 2003 (aged 21)	4	(Ireland) Leinster
Dan Sheehan	Hooker	17 September 1998 (aged 26)	32	(Ireland) Leinster
Finlay Bealham	Prop	9 October 1991 (aged 33)	51	(Ireland) Connacht
Jack Boyle	Prop	10 March 2002 (aged 22)	2	(Ireland) Leinster
Tom Clarkson	Prop	22 February 2000 (aged 24)	6	(Ireland) Leinster
Tadhg Furlong	Prop	14 November 1992 (aged 32)	79	(Ireland) Leinster
Cian Healy	Prop	7 October 1987 (aged 37)	137	(Ireland) Leinster
Andrew Porter	Prop	16 January 1996 (aged 29)	75	(Ireland) Leinster
Ryan Baird	Lock	26 July 1999 (aged 25)	27	(Ireland) Leinster
Tadhg Beirne	Lock	8 January 1992 (aged 33)	61	(Ireland) Munster
Iain Henderson	Lock	21 February 1992 (aged 32)	85	(Ireland) Ulster
Cormac Izuchukwu	Lock	28 January 2000 (aged 25)	1	(Ireland) Ulster
Joe McCarthy	Lock	26 March 2001 (aged 23)	19	(Ireland) Leinster
James Ryan	Lock	24 July 1996 (aged 28)	72	(Ireland) Leinster
Jack Conan	Back row	29 July 1992 (aged 32)	51	(Ireland) Leinster
Caelan Doris (c)	Back row	2 April 1998 (aged 26)	51	(Ireland) Leinster
Peter O'Mahony	Back row	17 September 1989 (aged 35)	114	(Ireland) Munster
Cian Prendergast	Back row	23 February 2000 (aged 24)	4	(Ireland) Connacht
Josh van der Flier	Back row	25 April 1993 (aged 31)	73	(Ireland) Leinster
Caolin Blade	Scrum-half	29 April 1994 (aged 30)	3	(Ireland) Connacht
Jamison Gibson-Park	Scrum-half	23 February 1992 (aged 32)	43	(Ireland) Leinster
Conor Murray	Scrum-half	20 April 1989 (aged 35)	125	(Ireland) Munster
Jack Crowley	Fly-half	13 January 2000 (aged 25)	24	(Ireland) Munster
Ciarán Frawley	Fly-half	4 December 1997 (aged 27)	8	(Ireland) Leinster
Sam Prendergast	Fly-half	12 February 2003 (aged 21)	8	(Ireland) Leinster
Bundee Aki	Centre	7 April 1990 (aged 34)	65	(Ireland) Connacht
Robbie Henshaw	Centre	12 June 1993 (aged 31)	82	(Ireland) Leinster
Jamie Osborne	Centre	16 November 2001 (aged 23)	7	(Ireland) Leinster
Garry Ringrose	Centre	26 January 1995 (aged 30)	67	(Ireland) Leinster
Mack Hansen	Wing	27 March 1998 (aged 26)	28	(Ireland) Connacht
James Lowe	Wing	8 July 1992 (aged 32)	40	(Ireland) Leinster
Calvin Nash	Wing	8 August 1997 (aged 27)	10	(Ireland) Munster
Hugo Keenan	Fullback	18 June 1996 (aged 28)	46	(Ireland) Leinster
Jimmy O'Brien	Fullback	27 November 1996 (aged 28)	8	(Ireland) Leinster

=== Development players ===
Player	Position	Date of birth (age)	Caps	Club/province
James McNabney	Back row	28 February 2003 (aged 21)	0	(Ireland) Ulster
Ben Murphy	Scrum-half	23 April 2001 (aged 23)	0	(Ireland) Connacht
Hugh Cooney	Centre	26 June 2003 (aged 21)	0	(Ireland) Leinster
Cathal Forde	Centre	11 April 2001 (aged 23)	0	(Ireland) Connacht

=== Call-ups ===
On 26 January 2025, Jack Aungier was called up as injury cover at prop, with Tadhg Furlong being ruled out of Ireland's opening match against England following a recurrence of a calf strain in training.

On 3 February 2025, Thomas Ahern and Shayne Bolton were called up to the squad.

On 16 February 2025, Gavin Coombes, John Hodnett, Diarmuid Mangan, Stuart McCloskey, Jacob Stockdale and Nick Timoney were called up to the squad ahead of Ireland's Round 3 match against Wales.

On 3 March 2025, Max Deegan, Darragh Murray, Tommy O'Brien and Tom O'Toole were called up to the squad ahead of Ireland's Round 4 match against France.

Player	Position	Date of birth (age)	Caps	Club/province
Jack Aungier	Prop	20 November 1998 (aged 26)	0	(Ireland) Connacht
Tom O'Toole	Prop	23 September 1998 (aged 26)	16	(Ireland) Ulster
Thomas Ahern	Lock	22 February 2000 (aged 24)	0	(Ireland) Munster
Darragh Murray	Lock	4 July 2001 (aged 23)	0	(Ireland) Connacht
Gavin Coombes	Back row	11 December 1997 (aged 27)	2	(Ireland) Munster
Max Deegan	Back row	1 October 1996 (aged 28)	2	(Ireland) Leinster
John Hodnett	Back row	10 January 1999 (aged 26)	0	(Ireland) Munster
Diarmuid Mangan	Back row	6 March 2003 (aged 21)	0	(Ireland) Leinster
Nick Timoney	Back row	1 August 1995 (aged 29)	3	(Ireland) Ulster
Stuart McCloskey	Centre	6 August 1992 (aged 32)	19	(Ireland) Ulster
Tommy O'Brien	Centre	28 May 1998 (aged 26)	0	(Ireland) Leinster
Shayne Bolton	Wing	29 June 2000 (aged 24)	0	(Ireland) Connacht
Jacob Stockdale	Wing	3 April 1996 (aged 28)	38	(Ireland) Ulster

== Italy ==
On 15 January 2025, Italy coach Gonzalo Quesada named a 34-man squad for the 2025 Six Nations Championship.

Head coach: (Argentina) Gonzalo Quesada

Player	Position	Date of birth (age)	Caps	Club/province
Tommaso Di Bartolomeo	Hooker	4 January 2001 (age 25)	0	(Italy) Zebre Parma
Giacomo Nicotera	Hooker	15 July 1996 (age 30)	29	(France) Stade Français
Simone Ferrari	Prop	28 March 1994 (age 32)	60	(Italy) Benetton
Danilo Fischetti	Prop	26 January 1998 (age 28)	48	(Italy) Zebre Parma
Marco Riccioni	Prop	19 October 1997 (age 28)	31	(England) Saracens
Luca Rizzoli	Prop	3 May 2002 (age 24)	0	(Italy) Zebre Parma
Giosuè Zilocchi	Prop	15 January 1997 (age 29)	22	(Italy) Benetton
Matteo Canali	Lock	11 September 1998 (age 28)	0	(Italy) Zebre Parma
Niccolò Cannone	Lock	17 May 1998 (age 28)	48	(Italy) Benetton
Riccardo Favretto	Lock	18 October 2001 (age 24)	4	(Italy) Benetton
Dino Lamb	Lock	18 April 1998 (age 28)	10	(England) Harlequins
Federico Ruzza	Lock	4 August 1994 (age 32)	60	(Italy) Benetton
Lorenzo Cannone	Back row	28 January 2001 (age 25)	24	(Italy) Benetton
Alessandro Izekor	Back row	5 March 2000 (age 26)	6	(Italy) Benetton
Michele Lamaro (c)	Back row	3 June 1998 (age 28)	44	(Italy) Benetton
Sebastian Negri	Back row	30 June 1994 (age 32)	59	(Italy) Benetton
Ross Vintcent	Back row	5 June 2002 (age 24)	10	(England) Exeter Chiefs
Manuel Zuliani	Back row	26 April 2000 (age 26)	28	(Italy) Benetton
Alessandro Garbisi	Scrum-half	11 April 2002 (age 24)	14	(Italy) Benetton
Martin Page-Relo	Scrum-half	6 January 1999 (age 27)	14	(France) Lyon
Stephen Varney	Scrum-half	15 May 2001 (age 25)	30	(France) Vannes
Tommaso Allan	Fly-half	26 April 1993 (age 33)	82	(France) Perpignan
Paolo Garbisi	Fly-half	26 April 2000 (age 26)	42	(France) Toulon
Leonardo Marin	Fly-half	23 February 2002 (age 24)	13	(Italy) Benetton
Giulio Bertaccini	Centre	29 November 2000 (age 25)	1	(Italy) Zebre Parma
Ignacio Brex	Centre	26 May 1992 (age 34)	42	(Italy) Benetton
Tommaso Menoncello	Centre	20 August 2002 (age 24)	24	(Italy) Benetton
Marco Zanon	Centre	3 October 1997 (age 29)	17	(Italy) Benetton
Simone Gesi	Wing	23 May 2001 (age 25)	2	(Italy) Zebre Parma
Monty Ioane	Wing	30 October 1994 (age 31)	36	(France) Lyon
Jacopo Trulla	Wing	5 July 2000 (age 26)	12	(Italy) Zebre Parma
Ange Capuozzo	Fullback	30 April 1999 (age 27)	24	(France) Toulouse
Matt Gallagher	Fullback	26 October 1996 (age 29)	2	(Italy) Benetton

== Scotland ==
On 15 January, Scotland coach Gregor Townsend named a 37-player squad ahead of the 2025 Six Nations Championship

Head coach: (Scotland) Gregor Townsend

Player	Position	Date of birth (age)	Caps	Club/province
Ewan Ashman	Hooker	3 April 2000 (aged 24)	22	(Scotland) Edinburgh
Dave Cherry	Hooker	3 January 1991 (aged 34)	11	(Scotland) Edinburgh
Patrick Harrison	Hooker	20 June 2002 (aged 22)	3	(Scotland) Edinburgh
Dylan Richardson	Hooker	15 January 1999 (aged 26)	6	(South Africa) Sharks
Jamie Bhatti	Prop	8 September 1993 (aged 31)	35	(Scotland) Glasgow Warriors
Zander Fagerson	Prop	19 January 1996 (aged 29)	70	(Scotland) Glasgow Warriors
Will Hurd	Prop	29 June 1999 (aged 25)	4	(England) Leicester Tigers
D'Arcy Rae	Prop	21 December 1994 (aged 30)	2	(Scotland) Edinburgh
Pierre Schoeman	Prop	7 May 1994 (aged 30)	37	(Scotland) Edinburgh
Rory Sutherland	Prop	24 August 1992 (aged 32)	37	(Scotland) Glasgow Warriors
Scott Cummings	Lock	3 December 1996 (aged 28)	42	(Scotland) Glasgow Warriors
Grant Gilchrist	Lock	9 August 1990 (aged 34)	74	(Scotland) Edinburgh
Jonny Gray	Lock	14 March 1994 (aged 30)	77	(France) Bordeaux Bègles
Marshall Sykes	Lock	29 December 1999 (aged 25)	1	(Scotland) Edinburgh
Josh Bayliss	Back row	18 September 1997 (aged 27)	10	(England) Bath
Gregor Brown	Back row	1 July 2001 (aged 23)	4	(Scotland) Glasgow Warriors
Luke Crosbie	Back row	22 April 1997 (aged 27)	12	(Scotland) Edinburgh
Rory Darge	Back row	23 February 2000 (aged 24)	25	(Scotland) Glasgow Warriors
Jack Dempsey	Back row	12 April 1994 (aged 30)	22	(Scotland) Glasgow Warriors
Matt Fagerson	Back row	16 July 1998 (aged 26)	50	(Scotland) Glasgow Warriors
Jack Mann	Back row	17 November 1999 (aged 25)	0	(Scotland) Glasgow Warriors
Jamie Ritchie	Back row	16 August 1996 (aged 28)	54	(Scotland) Edinburgh
Jamie Dobie	Scrum-half	7 June 2001 (aged 23)	9	(Scotland) Glasgow Warriors
George Horne	Scrum-half	12 May 1995 (aged 29)	34	(Scotland) Glasgow Warriors
Ben White	Scrum-half	27 May 1998 (aged 26)	24	(France) Toulon
Fergus Burke	Fly-half	3 September 1999 (aged 25)	0	(England) Saracens
Tom Jordan	Fly-half	18 September 1998 (aged 26)	3	(Scotland) Glasgow Warriors
Finn Russell	Fly-half	23 September 1992 (aged 32)	82	(England) Bath
Matt Currie	Centre	22 February 2001 (aged 23)	4	(Scotland) Edinburgh
Rory Hutchinson	Centre	29 January 1996 (aged 29)	8	(England) Northampton Saints
Huw Jones	Centre	17 December 1993 (aged 31)	53	(Scotland) Glasgow Warriors
Stafford McDowall	Centre	24 February 1998 (aged 26)	8	(Scotland) Glasgow Warriors
Sione Tuipulotu (c)	Centre	12 February 1997 (aged 27)	30	(Scotland) Glasgow Warriors
Darcy Graham	Wing	21 June 1997 (aged 27)	42	(Scotland) Edinburgh
Kyle Rowe	Wing	8 February 1998 (aged 26)	9	(Scotland) Glasgow Warriors
Duhan van der Merwe	Wing	4 June 1995 (aged 29)	44	(Scotland) Edinburgh
Blair Kinghorn	Fullback	18 January 1997 (aged 28)	55	(France) Toulouse

=== Call-ups ===
On 3 March 2025, Nathan McBeth and Ben Muncaster were called up to the squad, ahead of the fourth round of the tournament.

On 10 March 2025, Adam Hastings, Alex Masibaka and Kyle Steyn were called up to the squad, ahead of the final round of the tournament.

Player	Position	Date of birth (age)	Caps	Club/province
Nathan McBeth	Prop	8 June 1998 (aged 26)	2	(Scotland) Glasgow Warriors
Alex Masibaka	Back row	9 August 2001 (aged 23)	0	(France) Soyaux Angoulême
Ben Muncaster	Back row	14 October 2001 (aged 23)	1	(Scotland) Edinburgh
Adam Hastings	Fly-half	5 October 1996 (aged 28)	31	(Scotland) Glasgow Warriors
Kyle Steyn	Wing	29 January 1994 (aged 31)	23	(Scotland) Glasgow Warriors

== Wales ==
On 13 January 2025, Wales head coach Warren Gatland named a 34-player squad for the 2025 Six Nations Championship.

- Head coach:
  - (New Zealand) Warren Gatland (Rounds 1 and 2)
  - (England) Matt Sherratt (Round 3 onwards)

Player	Position	Date of birth (age)	Caps	Club/province
Elliot Dee	Hooker	7 March 1994 (aged 30)	51	(Wales) Dragons
Evan Lloyd	Hooker	28 December 2001 (aged 23)	5	(Wales) Cardiff
Sam Parry	Hooker	17 December 1991 (aged 33)	7	(Wales) Ospreys
Keiron Assiratti	Prop	30 June 1997 (aged 27)	10	(Wales) Cardiff
WillGriff John	Prop	14 December 1992 (aged 32)	2	(England) Sale Sharks
Kemsley Mathias	Prop	29 July 1999 (aged 25)	5	(Wales) Scarlets
Nicky Smith	Prop	7 April 1994 (aged 30)	49	(England) Leicester Tigers
Gareth Thomas	Prop	2 August 1993 (aged 31)	35	(Wales) Ospreys
Henry Thomas	Prop	30 October 1991 (aged 33)	4	(Wales) Scarlets
Dafydd Jenkins	Lock	5 December 2002 (aged 22)	19	(England) Exeter Chiefs
Will Rowlands	Lock	19 September 1991 (aged 33)	36	(France) Racing 92
Freddie Thomas	Lock	9 November 2001 (aged 23)	1	(England) Gloucester
Christ Tshiunza	Lock	9 January 2002 (aged 23)	15	(England) Exeter Chiefs
Teddy Williams	Lock	18 October 2000 (aged 24)	2	(Wales) Cardiff
James Botham	Back row	22 February 1998 (aged 26)	16	(Wales) Cardiff
Taulupe Faletau	Back row	12 November 1990 (aged 34)	104	(Wales) Cardiff
Jac Morgan	Back row	21 January 2000 (aged 25)	17	(Wales) Ospreys
Tommy Reffell	Back row	27 April 1999 (aged 25)	23	(England) Leicester Tigers
Aaron Wainwright	Back row	25 September 1997 (aged 27)	52	(Wales) Dragons
Ellis Bevan	Scrum-half	10 March 2000 (aged 24)	6	(Wales) Cardiff
Rhodri Williams	Scrum-half	5 May 1993 (aged 31)	5	(Wales) Dragons
Tomos Williams	Scrum-half	1 January 1995 (aged 30)	59	(England) Gloucester
Dan Edwards	Fly-half	7 May 2003 (aged 21)	0	(Wales) Ospreys
Ben Thomas	Fly-half	25 November 1998 (aged 26)	7	(Wales) Cardiff
Eddie James	Centre	10 August 2002 (aged 22)	3	(Wales) Scarlets
Joe Roberts	Centre	10 May 2000 (aged 24)	2	(Wales) Scarlets
Nick Tompkins	Centre	16 February 1995 (aged 29)	38	(England) Saracens
Owen Watkin	Centre	12 October 1996 (aged 28)	42	(Wales) Ospreys
Josh Adams	Wing	21 April 1995 (aged 29)	59	(Wales) Cardiff
Josh Hathaway	Wing	19 October 2003 (aged 21)	2	(England) Gloucester
Ellis Mee	Wing	6 October 2003 (aged 21)	0	(Wales) Scarlets
Blair Murray	Wing	9 October 2001 (aged 23)	3	(Wales) Scarlets
Tom Rogers	Fullback	17 December 1998 (aged 26)	5	(Wales) Scarlets
Liam Williams	Fullback	9 April 1991 (aged 33)	92	(England) Saracens

=== Call-ups ===
On 13 February 2025, interim head coach Matt Sherratt called up centre Max Llewellyn, and fly-halves Gareth Anscombe and Jarrod Evans to the squad, ahead of the third round of the tournament.

On 25 February 2025, Dewi Lake was called up to the squad, ahead of the fourth round of the tournament.

Player	Position	Date of birth (age)	Caps	Club/province
Dewi Lake	Hooker	16 May 1999 (aged 25)	18	(Wales) Ospreys
Gareth Anscombe	Fly-half	10 May 1991 (aged 33)	39	(England) Gloucester
Jarrod Evans	Fly-half	25 July 1996 (aged 28)	8	(England) Harlequins
Max Llewellyn	Centre	13 January 1999 (aged 26)	5	(England) Gloucester
