= 2023 Six Nations Under 20s Championship =

Under 20 Rugby union competition

- Date: 3 February 2023 – 19 March 2023
- Countries: England; France; Ireland; Italy; Scotland; Wales

Tournament statistics
- Champions: Ireland (5th title)
- Grand Slam: Ireland (4)
- Triple Crown: Ireland
- Matches played: 15

The 2023 Six Nations Under 20s Championship was the 16th Six Nations Under 20s Championship, the annual northern hemisphere rugby union championship for players under 20 years of age. Ireland retained the championship, their fifth, winning all five matches as they had done in the last tournament to record a fourth Grand Slam. Ireland became the first team to win back-to-back Grand Slams in the history of the tournament.

== Participants ==
Nation	Stadium			Head coach	Captain
Nation	Home stadium	Capacity	Location	Head coach	Captain
England	Twickenham Stoop; Kingsholm Stadium; Recreation Ground	14,800; 16,115; 14,509	London; Gloucester; Bath	Alan Dickens	Lewis Chessum
France	Stade Armandie; Stade Charles-Mathon	14,000; 11,500	Agen; Oyonnax	Sébastien Calvet	Nicolas Depoortere
Ireland	Musgrave Park	8,008	Cork	Richie Murphy	Gus McCarthy
Italy	Stadio Comunale di Monigo	5,000	Treviso	Massimo Brunello	David Odiase
Scotland	Scotstoun Stadium	9,708	Glasgow	Kenny Murray	Duncan Munn; Liam McConnell
Wales	Eirias Stadium	6,080	Colwyn Bay	Byron Hayward	Ryan Woodman

== Table ==
Pos	Nation	Games				Points			Tries		Bonus points			Total points
Pos	Nation	Played	Won	Drawn	Lost	For	Against	Diff	For	Against	Tries	Loss	GSB	Total points
1	Ireland	5	5	0	0	239	116	+123	32	17	4	0	3	27
2	France	5	4	0	1	222	96	+126	32	13	4	1	0	21
3	Italy	5	2	0	3	148	146	+2	24	18	5	2	0	15
4	England	5	3	0	2	141	160	−19	21	21	3	0	0	15
5	Scotland	5	1	0	4	90	234	−144	10	34	0	1	0	5
6	Wales	5	0	0	5	107	195	−88	14	30	1	2	0	3

Table ranking rules

- Four match points are awarded for a win.
- Two match points are awarded for a draw.
- A bonus match point is awarded to a team that scores four or more tries in a match or loses a match by seven points or fewer. If a team scores four tries in a match and loses by seven points or fewer, they are awarded both bonus points.
- Three bonus match points are awarded to a team that wins all five of their matches (known as a Grand Slam). This ensures that a Grand Slam winning team reaches a minimum of 23 points, and thus always ranks over a team who won four matches in which they also were awarded four try bonus points and were also awarded two bonus points (a try bonus and a losing bonus) in the match that they lost for a total of 22 points.
- Tie-breakers
  - If two or more teams are tied on match points, the team with the better points difference (points scored less points conceded) is ranked higher.
  - If the above tie-breaker fails to separate tied teams, the team that scored the higher number of total tries in their matches is ranked higher.
  - If two or more teams remain tied for first place at the end of the championship after applying the above tiebreakers, the title is shared between them.

== Fixtures ==
=== Week 1 ===
3 February 2023
18:30

Italy	27–28	France
Try: Berlese 7' c Gallorini 24' m Rubinato 32' m Mey 51' m Douglas 83' m Con: Sante (1/4) 8'; Bruniera (0/1); Pen: Sante (0/1)	Report	Try: Moustin 28' c penalty 38'; Castro 71' m Con: Tarel (1/1) 29'; Desperes (0/1); Pen: Tarel (2/3) 10', 20'

Stadio Comunale di Monigo, Treviso
Referee: Reuben Keane (Australia)

3 February 2023
19:00

Wales	27–44	Ireland
Try: Hennessey 9' c Morgan 18' m, 77' c Scarfe 52' m Con: D. Edwards (2/4) 11', 78'; Pen: D. Edwards (1/1) 16'	Report	Try: O'Tighearnaigh 7' c P. McCarthy 31' c Nicholson 54' c, 65' m Quinn 61' m McErlean 80' c Con: Prendergast (3/5) 8', 32', 55'; West (1/1) 82'; Pen: Prendergast (2/2) 59', 73'

Eirias Stadium, Colwyn Bay
Referee: Luc Ramos (France)

FB	15	Cameron Winnett	(substituted off) 73'
RW	14	Llien Morgan
OC	13	Louie Hennessey
IC	12	Harri Ackerman
LW	11	Harri Houston	(substituted off) 68'
FH	10	Dan Edwards
SH	9	Archie Hughes	(substituted off) 68'
N8	8	Huw Davies
OF	7	Luca Giannini
BF	6	Ryan Woodman (c)
RL	5	Jonny Green	(substituted off) 28'
LL	4	Liam Edwards	(substituted off) 60'
TP	3	Thomas Pritchard	(substituted off) 54'
HK	2	Sam Scarfe	(substituted off) 67'
LP	1	Dylan Kelleher-Griffiths	(substituted off) 67'
Replacements:
HK	16	Isaac Young	(substituted on) 67'
PR	17	Freddie Chapman	(substituted on) 67'
PR	18	Ellis Fackrell	(substituted on) 54'
LK	19	Owain Evans	(substituted on) 28'
BR	20	Mackenzie Martin	(substituted on) 60'
SH	21	Harri Williams	(substituted on) 69'
FB	22	Harrison James	(substituted on) 73'
WG	23	Tom Florence	(substituted on) 68'
Coach:
Byron Hayward

FB	15	James Nicholson
RW	14	Morrison Mabope	(substituted off) 45'
OC	13	Hugh Cooney
IC	12	John Devine (rugby union)
LW	11	Hugh Gavin
FH	10	Sam Prendergast	(substituted off) 73'
SH	9	Fintan Gunne	(substituted off) 73'
N8	8	Brian Gleeson
OF	7	Ruadhán Quinn	(substituted off) 67'
BF	6	James McNabney	(substituted off) 60'
RL	5	Conor O'Tighearnaigh
LL	4	Diarmuid Mangan
TP	3	Paddy McCarthy	(substituted off) 70'
HK	2	Gus McCarthy (c)	(substituted off) 73'
LP	1	George Hadden	(substituted off) 60'
Replacements:
HK	16	Danny Sheahan	(substituted on) 73'
PR	17	George Morris	(substituted on) 60'
PR	18	Fiachna Barrett	(substituted on) 70'
LK	19	Evan O'Connell	(substituted on) 60'
FL	20	Jacob Sheahan	(substituted on) 67'
SH	21	Oscar Cawley	(substituted on) 73'
FH	22	Harry West	(substituted on) 73'
WG	23	Henry McErlean	(substituted on) 45'
Coach:
Richie Murphy

3 February 2023
19:00

England	41–36	Scotland
Try: Hathaway 2' m, 8' c, 14' m Cunningham-South 18' c Carnduff 24' c Elliott 68' c Con: Harris (4/6) 10', 19', 26', 70'; Pen: Harris (1/2) 79'	Report	Try: McLeod 6' c Brown 31' c McConnell 44' c Con: Simpson (3/3) 8', 31', 45'; Pen: Simpson (5/5) 13', 41', 56', 60', 63'

Twickenham Stoop, London
Referee: Angus Mabey (New Zealand)

=== Week 2 ===
10 February 2023
19:00

England	32–25	Italy
Try: Harris 8' m Ma'asi-White 12' c Elliott 38' m Cunningham-South 55' c Fasogbon 75' m Con: Harris (2) 13', 57'; Pen: Harris 30'	Report	Try: Aminu 23' m, 64' m Gallorini 46' c Bozzoni 79' m Con: Bruniera 47'; Pen: Sante 33'

Kingsholm Stadium, Gloucester
Referee: Ben Breakspear (Wales)

10 February 2023
19:15

Scotland	18–17	Wales
Try: Brown 9' m Penalty try 49'; Pen: Afshar 29'; King 69'	Report	Try: Morse 44' c Andrew 54' c Con: Edwards 45', 55'; Pen: Edwards 52'

Scotstoun Stadium, Glasgow
Referee: Reuben Keane (Australia)

10 February 2023
20:00

Ireland	33–31	France
Try: P. McCarthy 12' c Gavin 29' c Gleeson 69' c Con: Prendergast 13', 30', 70'; Pen: Prendergast 10', 24', 42', 77'	Report	Try: Auradou 18' c Liufau 34' c Attissogbé 58' m Nouchi 61' m Benmegal 72' c Con: Raffy 19', 35'; Reus 73'

Musgrave Park, Cork
Attendance: 8,008
Referee: Angus Mabey (New Zealand)

FB	15	Henry McErlean
RW	14	James Nicholson
OC	13	Hugh Cooney
IC	12	John Devine (rugby union)
LW	11	Hugh Gavin
FH	10	Sam Prendergast	(substituted off) 73'
SH	9	Fintan Gunne
N8	8	Brian Gleeson
OF	7	Ruadhán Quinn	(substituted off) 56' (substituted on) 63'
BF	6	James McNabney
RL	5	Conor O'Tighearnaigh	(substituted off) 56'
LL	4	Diarmuid Mangan
TP	3	Paddy McCarthy	(substituted off) 70'
HK	2	Gus McCarthy (c)	(substituted off) 47' (substituted on) 55'
LP	1	George Hadden
Replacements:
HK	16	Danny Sheahan	(substituted on) 47' (substituted off) 55'
PR	17	George Morris	(substituted on) 56' (substituted off) 63'
PR	18	Fiachna Barrett	(substituted on) 70'
LK	19	Evan O'Connell	(substituted on) 56'
FL	20	Jacob Sheahan
SH	21	Oscar Cawley
FH	22	Harry West
WG	23	Rory Telfer
Coach:
Richie Murphy

FB	15	Louis Bielle-Biarrey		(substituted off) 59'
RW	14	Théo Attissogbé
OC	13	Nicolas Depoortère (c)
IC	12	Émilien Gailleton
LW	11	Enzo Benmegal
FH	10	Tom Raffy		(substituted off) 50'
SH	9	Léo Carbonneau
N8	8	Marko Gazzotti
OF	7	Lenni Nouchi
BF	6	Oscar Jégou		(substituted off) 74'
RL	5	Brent Liufau
LL	4	Hugo Auradou		(substituted off) 65' (substituted on) 78'
TP	3	Zaccharie Affane	(yellow card) 29'	(substituted off) 71'
HK	2	Barnabé Massa		(substituted off) 40'
LP	1	Louis Penverne		(substituted off) 71'
Replacements:
HK	16	Thomas Lacombre		(substituted on) 40'
PR	17	Luca Tabarot		(substituted on) 71'
PR	18	Maino Pakihivatau		(substituted on) 71'
LK	19	Bastien Chinarro		(substituted on) 65' (substituted on) 78'
FH	20	Mathis Castro-Ferreira		(substituted on) 74'
SH	21	Hugo Reus		Substituted on
FH	22	Arthur Mathiron
WG	23	Mathis Ferté		(substituted on) 59'
Coach:
Sébastien Calvet

=== Week 3 ===
24 February 2023
19:15

(1 BP) Italy	27–44	Ireland (1 BP)
Try: Quattrini 13'; Botturi 47'; Mey 58'; Gasperini 69'; Con: Sante (2) 48' 60'; Pen: Sante 24'	Report	Try: Gleeson 3'; Gunne 15'; McNabney 29'; Cooney 52'; Telfer 77'; Con: Prendergast (5) 4', 16', 29', 52', 78'; Pen: Prendergast (3) 20', 40', 65'

Stadio Comunale di Monigo, Treviso
Attendance: 4,504
Referee: Hollie Davidson (Scotland)

FB	15	François Carlo Mey
RW	14	Alessandro Gesi
OC	13	Dewi Passarella
IC	12	Nicola Bozzo
LW	11	Matthias Douglas		(substituted off) 27'
FH	10	Giovanni Sante		(substituted off) 65'
SH	9	Sebastiano Battara		(substituted off) 72'
N8	8	Jacopo Botturi
OF	7	David Odiase
BF	6	Carlos Berlese		(substituted off) 50'
RL	5	Pietro Turrisi		(substituted off) 56'
LL	4	Alex Mattioli
TP	3	Marcos Gallorini		(substituted off) 79'
HK	2	Giovanni Quattrini		(substituted off) 69'
LP	1	Destiny Aminu		(substituted off) 72'
Replacements:
HK	16	Nicholas Gasperini		(substituted on) 65'
PR	17	Samuele Taddei		(substituted on) 72'
PR	18	Alex Artuso		(substituted on) 79'
LK	19	Enrico Pontarini		(substituted on) 56'
BR	20	Filippo Lavorenti		(substituted on) 50'
BR	21	Filipp Bozzoni		(substituted on) 27'
WG	22	Simone Brisighella		(substituted on) 68'
WG	23	Valerio Siciliano	(substituted on) 72'
Coach:
Massimo Brunello

FB	15	Henry McErlean
RW	14	James Nicholson
OC	13	Hugh Cooney	(substituted off) 75'
IC	12	John Devine (rugby union)	(substituted off) 65'
LW	11	Hugh Gavin
FH	10	Sam Prendergast
SH	9	Fintan Gunne	(substituted off) 75'
N8	8	Brian Gleeson	(substituted off) 69'
OF	7	Ruadhán Quinn	(substituted off) 56'
BF	6	James McNabney
RL	5	Conor O'Tighearnaigh
LL	4	Diarmuid Mangan
TP	3	Paddy McCarthy	(substituted off) 70'
HK	2	Gus McCarthy (c)	(substituted off) 79'
LP	1	George Hadden	(substituted off) 60'
Replacements:
HK	16	Danny Sheahan	(substituted on) 79'
PR	17	George Morris	(substituted on) 60'
PR	18	Fiachna Barrett	(substituted on) 70'
LK	19	Evan O'Connell	(substituted on) 56'
FL	20	Jacob Sheahan	(substituted on) 69'
SH	21	Oscar Cawley	(substituted on) 75'
FH	22	Harry West	(substituted on) 75'
WG	23	Rory Telfer	(substituted on) 65'
Coach:
Richie Murphy

24 February 2023
19:15

Wales	21–37	England (1 BP)
	Report

Eirias Stadium, Colwyn Bay
Attendance: 6,080
Referee: Eoghan Cross (Ireland)

24 February 2023
19:15

(1 BP) France	54–12	Scotland
	Report

Stade Armandie, Agen
Attendance: 10,411
Referee: Frederico Vedovelli (Italy)

=== Week 4 ===
10 March 2023
19:15

(1 BP) Italy	29–25	Wales (1 BP)
	Report

Stadio Comunale di Monigo, Treviso
Referee: Anthony Woodthorpe (England)

10 March 2023
19:15

Scotland	7–82	Ireland (1 BP)
Try: Tait 46'; Con: Townsend 47'	Report	Try: Osbourne 2'; Barrett 6'; G. McCarthy 15'; Quinn (3) 20', 34', 64'; Gunne 30'; McNabney 41'; Mangan 51'; D. Sheahan 70'; Telfer 75'; Cawley 79'; Con: Prendergast (7) 3', 7', 16', 22', 31', 35', 52'; Lynch (4) 65', 71', 76', 79'

Scotstoun Stadium, Glasgow
Attendance: 2,792
Referee: Takehito Namekawa (Japan)

FB	15	Dan King	(substituted off) 54'
RW	14	Logan Jarvie	(substituted off) 51'
OC	13	Duncan Munn (c)	(substituted off) 71'
IC	12	Kerr Yule
LW	11	Geordie Gwynn
FH	10	Luke Townsend
SH	9	Finlay Burgess	(substituted off) 35'
N8	8	Jonny Morris	(substituted off) 40'
OF	7	Rudi Brown
BF	6	Liam McConnell (c)
RL	5	Harris McLeod	(substituted off) 54'
LL	4	Jake Parkinson
TP	3	Moby Ogunlaja	(substituted off) 51'
HK	2	Corey Tate	(substituted off) 66'
LP	1	Craig Davidson	(substituted off) 66'
Replacements:
HK	16	Elliott Young	(substituted on) 66'
PR	17	Max Surry	(substituted on) 66'
PR	18	Robbie Deans	(substituted on) 51'
LK	19	Ruairaidh Hart	(substituted on) 54'
BR	20	Sam Derrick	(substituted on) 40'
BR	21	Charlie Clare	(substituted on) 35'
WG	22	Ben Salmon	(substituted on) 51'
WG	23	Andy McLean	(substituted on) 54'
Coach:
Kenny Murray

FB	15	Henry McErlean
RW	14	Andrew Osbourne
OC	13	Hugh Cooney	(substituted off) 60'
IC	12	John Devine (rugby union)
LW	11	Hugh Gavin
FH	10	Sam Prendergast	(substituted off) 52'
SH	9	Fintan Gunne	(substituted off) 60'
N8	8	Brian Gleeson	(substituted off) 68'
OF	7	Ruadhán Quinn
BF	6	James McNabney
RL	5	Conor O'Tighearnaigh	(substituted off) 51' (substituted on) 70'
LL	4	Evan O'Connell	(substituted off) 70'
TP	3	Fiachna Barrett	(substituted off) 50'
HK	2	Gus McCarthy (c)	(substituted off) 50'
LP	1	George Hadden	(substituted off) 50'
Replacements:
HK	16	Danny Sheahan	(substituted on) 50'
PR	17	Paddy McCarthy	(substituted on) 50'
PR	18	Diarmuid Mangan	(substituted on) 51'
LK	19	Liam Molony	(substituted on) 66'
FL	20	Jacob Sheahan	(substituted on) 69'
SH	21	Oscar Cawley	(substituted on) 60'
FH	22	Matty Lynch	(substituted on) 52'
WG	23	Rory Telfer	(substituted on) 60'
Coach:
Richie Murphy

10 March 2023
20:00

England	7–42	France (1 BP)
Try: Harris 56' c Con: Harris (1/1) 57'	Report	Try: Drouet 35' c Gailleton 50' c Penverne 63' c Castro Ferreira 72' c Guilly 78' m Con: Reus (4/5) 36', 52', 64', 73'; Pen: Reus (3/3) 12', 25', 49'

Recreation Ground, Bath
Attendance: 11,083
Referee: Hollie Davidson (Scotland)

=== Week 5 ===
19 March 2023
15:00

Scotland	17–40	Italy
	Report

Scotstoun Stadium, Glasgow

19 March 2023
18:00

Ireland	36–24	England
Try: Gavin (2) 3', 58'; Gleeson (2) 26', 53'; Hadden 50'; Gunne 78'; Con: Prendergast (3) 27', 54', 60'	Report	Try: Elliott (2) 15', 75'; Jenkins 70'; Con: Harris 16'; Worsley (2) 70', 76'; Pen: Harris 57'

Musgrave Park, Cork
Attendance: 8,008
Referee: Adriaan Jacobs (South Africa)

FB	15	Henry McErlean	(substituted off) 52' (substituted on) 60'
RW	14	James Nicholson
OC	13	Hugh Cooney
IC	12	John Devine (rugby union)	(substituted off) 70'
LW	11	Hugh Gavin
FH	10	Sam Prendergast
SH	9	Fintan Gunne	(substituted off) 79'
N8	8	Brian Gleeson
OF	7	Ruadhán Quinn	(substituted off) 62'
BF	6	James McNabney
RL	5	Conor O'Tighearnaigh
LL	4	Diarmuid Mangan	(substituted off) 70'
TP	3	Paddy McCarthy	(substituted off) 67'
HK	2	Gus McCarthy (c)	(substituted off) 79'
LP	1	George Hadden	(substituted off) 67'
Replacements:
HK	16	Danny Sheahan	(substituted on) 79'
PR	17	George Morris	(substituted on) 67'
PR	18	Fiachna Barrett	(substituted on) 67'
LK	19	Joe Hopes	(substituted on) 70'
FL	20	Liam Molony	(substituted on) 62'
SH	21	Oscar Cawley	(substituted on) 79'
FH	22	Harry West	(substituted on) 70'
WG	23	Andrew Osbourne	(substituted on) 52' (substituted off) 60'
Coach:
Richie Murphy

FB	15	Sam Harris	(substituted off) 67'
RW	14	Cassius Cleaves
OC	13	Rekeiti Ma'asi-White	(substituted off) 56' (substituted on) 67'
IC	12	Joseph Woodward	(substituted off) 67'
LW	11	Tobias Elliott
FH	10	Monty Bradbury
SH	9	Charlie Bracken	(substituted off) 67'
N8	8	Chandler Cunningham-South
OF	7	Greg Fisilau
BF	6	Finn Carnduff	(substituted off) 60'
RL	5	Lewis Chessum (c)
LL	4	Danny Eite	(substituted off) 67'
TP	3	Afolabi Fasogbon	(substituted off) 54'
HK	2	Finn Theobald-Thomas	(substituted off) 67'
LP	1	Archie McArthur	(substituted off) 54' (substituted on) 80'
Replacements:
HK	16	Nathan Jibulu	(substituted on) 67'
PR	17	Asher Opoku-Fordjour	(substituted on) 54' (substituted off) 80'
PR	18	Tim Hoyt	(substituted on) 54'
LK	19	Rob Carmichael	(substituted on) 67'
FH	20	Tristan Woodman	(substituted on) 60'
SH	21	Nye Thomas	Substituted on
FH	22	Sam Worsley	(substituted on) 67'
WG	23	Joe Jenkins	(substituted on) 58'
Coach:
Alan Dickens

19 March 2023
21:00

France	67–16	Wales
	Report

Stade Charles-Mathon, Oyonnax
