= Paddy McCarthy (rugby union) =

Irish rugby union player (born 2003)

- Born: 28 May 2003 (age 23)
- Height: 182 cm (6 ft 0 in)
- Weight: 110 kg (243 lb)
- School: Blackrock College
- University: Trinity College Dublin
- Notable relative: Joe McCarthy

Rugby union career
- Position: Prop
- Current team: Leinster
Senior career
| Years | Team | Apps | (Points) |
| 2023– | Leinster | 15 | (0) |
International career
| Years | Team | Apps | (Points) |
| 2023 | Ireland U20 | 10 | (10) |
| 2025 | Ireland A | 1 | (0) |
| 2025– | Ireland | 4 | (5) |
- Correct as of 11 January 2026

Paddy McCarthy (born 28 May 2003) is an Irish professional rugby union player who plays prop for United Rugby Championship side Leinster and the Ireland national team.

== Early life ==
He attended Blackrock College where he was teammates with future Leinster hooker Gus McCarthy.

== Club career ==
A product of the Leinster Rugby academy, he made his first team debut in the United Rugby Championship against Glasgow Warriors in October 2023. He was officially promoted to the Leinster senior squad ahead of the 2024–25 season.

== International career ==
McCarthy was a member of the Ireland U20 side which won the grand slam at the 2023 Six Nations Under 20s Championship.

In June 2025, he was called up to the senior side for their summer tour. Although he did not make his debut in the summer he retained his place for the 2025 Autumn Nations Series. He made his debut as a replacement on 1 November 2025 against New Zealand in Chicago, in a 26–13 defeat. In the following weeks, he scored his first international try in a 41–10 win over Japan, and then made his first senior start for Ireland against Australia on 15 November.

== Honours ==
Leinster

- United Rugby Championship
  - Winner (1): 2024-25

Ireland Under 20's

- Six Nations Under 20s Championship:
  - Winner (1): 2023
- Grand Slam:
  - Winner (1): 2023
- Triple Crown:
  - Winner (1): 2023

== Personal life ==
His older brother is fellow rugby union player Joe McCarthy. He studied global business at Trinity College Dublin on a sports scholarship.
