= Ruadhán Quinn =

Irish rugby union player

- Born: Ruadhán Quinn; 17 October 2003 (age 23) Dublin, Ireland
- Height: 1.75 m (5 ft 9 in)
- Weight: 111 kg (17.5 st; 245 lb)
- School: Crescent College

Rugby union career
- Position: Back-row
Amateur team(s)
Years	Team	Apps	(Points)
- Ballina-Killaloe RFC
2022–	Old Crescent		
Senior career
Years	Team	Apps	(Points)
2022–	Munster	28	(20)
- Correct as of 04 April 2026
International career
Years	Team	Apps	(Points)
2022	Ireland U19	2	(5)
2023	Ireland U20	9	(25)
2025-	Ireland A	1	(0)
- Correct as of 8 November 2025

Ruadhán Quinn (born 17 October 2003) is an Irish rugby union player who plays as a flanker or number eight for United Rugby Championship club Munster.

== Early life and amateur rugby ==
Quinn was born in Dublin . . He attended Crescent College and played for the school's rugby team, scoring a hat-trick of tries in Crescent's 17–15 win against Bandon Grammar School in the semi-finals of the 2022 Munster Schools Senior Cup, before the school defeated Presentation Brothers College 26–5 in the final to secure a twelfth Schools Senior Cup.

== Munster ==
Quinn earned selection for the Munster under-19s during the 2021–22 season and entered year one of Munster's academy ahead of the 2022–23 season, straight after finishing school. A few days before getting his leaving cert results, Quinn made his non-competitive senior debut for Munster, appearing off the bench in the province's 28–19 defeat against English club Gloucester in a friendly on 26 August 2022 to replace Jack O'Sullivan, who'd left the field with a head injury in the 3rd minute.

Quinn made his senior competitive debut for Munster in their 2022–23 United Rugby Championship round three fixture against Italian club Zebre Parma on 1 October 2022, coming on in the 73rd minute as a replacement for Jack O'Sullivan in the province's 21–5 home win and in doing so becoming the youngest player to line out for Munster in a competitive fixture during the professional era, with Quinn being 18-years-old at the time.

== Ireland ==
Quinn was selected in the Ireland under-19s squad for their double-header against France in April 2022, starting in both matches. He was selected in the Ireland under-20s squad for the 2023 Six Nations Under 20s Championship, starting and scoring one try in their opening round 44–27 away win against Wales on 3 February, before also starting in the 33–31 home win against France in round two on 10 February, the 44–27 away win against Italy in round three on 24 February, the 82–7 away win against Scotland on 10 March, in which Quinn scored a hat-trick of tries and earned the player of the match award, and the 36–24 win against England on 19 March that secured the grand slam for Ireland.

Quinn was retained in the squad for the 2023 World Rugby U20 Championship, starting and scoring one try in Ireland's opening 34–34 draw with England on 24 June, and starting in the 30–10 win against Australia on 29 June, the 31–12 win against hosts South Africa in the semi-finals on 9 July, and the 50–14 defeat against France in the final on 14 July.

== Honours ==
=== Crescent College ===
- Munster Schools Senior Cup:
  - Winner (1): 2022

=== Munster ===
- United Rugby Championship
  - Winner (1): 2022–23

=== Ireland under-20s ===
- Six Nations Under 20s Championship:
  - Winner (1): 2023
- Grand Slam:
  - Winner (1): 2023
- Triple Crown:
  - Winner (1): 2023
