= Tommaso Di Bartolomeo =

Italy international rugby union player

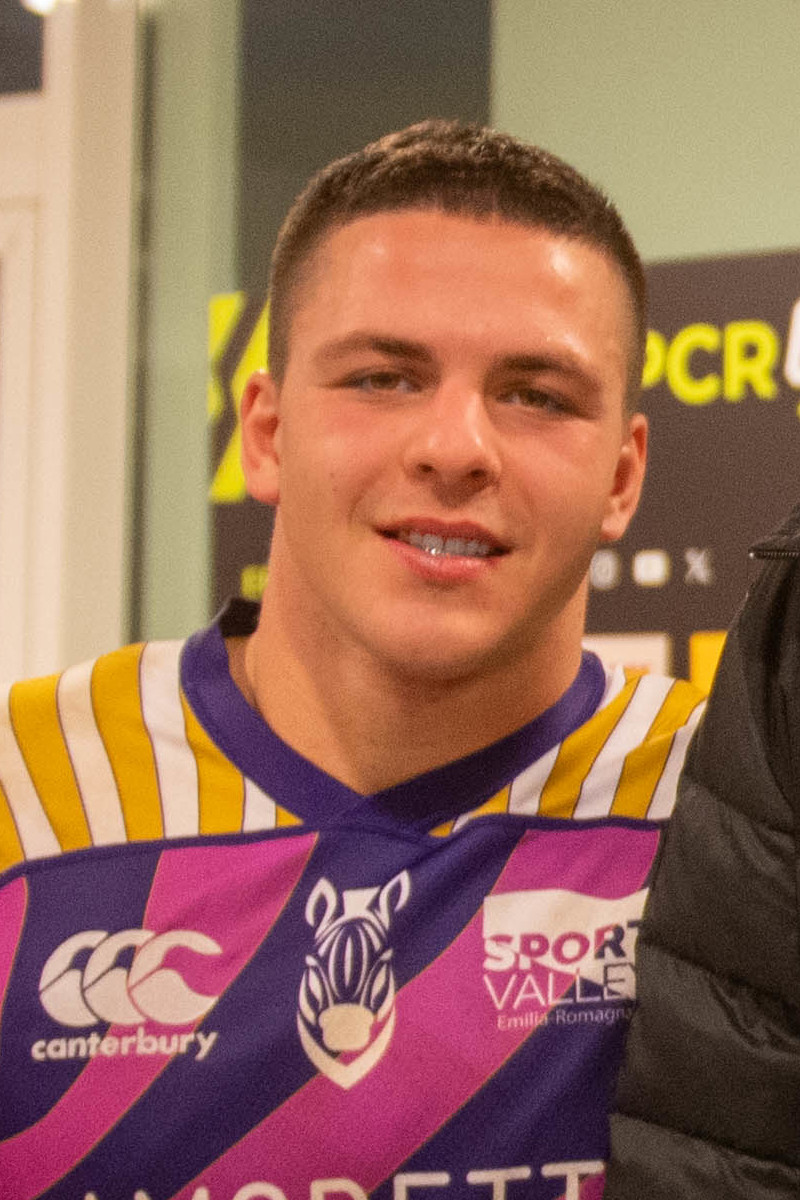
- Di Bartolomeo in 2025
- Born: Tommaso Di Bartolomeo; 4 January 2001 (age 25) Padua, Italy
- Height: 1.80 m (5 ft 11 in)
- Weight: 105 kg (16.5 st; 231 lb)

Rugby union career
- Position: Hooker
- Current team: Zebre Parma
Youth career
- Petrarca
Senior career
Years	Team	Apps	(Points)
2017−2021	F.I.R. Academy		
2021−2023	Petrarca	27	(50)
2022−2023	→ Zebre Parma	1	(0)
2023−	Zebre Parma	40	(40)
- Correct as of 9 Aug 2026
International career
Years	Team	Apps	(Points)
2021	Italy U20	5	(10)
2021−2022	Emerging Italy	2	(5)
2022	Italy A	1	(0)
2025−	Italy	12	(15)
- Correct as of 9 Aug 2026

Tommaso Di Bartolomeo (born 4 October 2001) is an Italian rugby union player, currently playing for Italian United Rugby Championship side Zebre Parma. His preferred position is hooker.

== Career ==
Under contract with Italian Top10 team Petrarca, in March 2022, Di Bartolomeo was named as a Permit Player for Zebre Parma for 2021–22 United Rugby Championship season ahead of the re-arranged Round 7 match against the Sharks. He made his debut in the same match, coming on as a replacement.

In 2021, Di Bartolomeo was named in Italy U20s squad for the annual Six Nations Under 20s Championship. On 8 December, he was named in Emerging Italy 27-man squad also for the 2021 end-of-year rugby union internationals. On 26 May, he was called in Italy A squad for the South African tour in the 2022 mid-year rugby union tests against Namibia and Currie Cup XV team. On 30 November 2023, he was called in Italy Under 23 squad for test series against IRFU Combined Academies.

He was named to Italy 2025 Six Nations squad as an invited player, but did not play during the championship. He was also called up to participate in 2025 Tour of Namibia and South Africa. He made his debut against Namibia in Windhoek during the first match of the tour.
