= Andrew Osborne (rugby union, born 2003) =

Irish rugby union player

- Born: Andrew Osborne; 16 August 2003 (age 23) Naas, County Kildare, Ireland
- Height: 1.88 m (6 ft 2 in)
- Weight: 93 kg (14.6 st; 205 lb)
- School: Naas CBS
- Notable relative: Jamie Osborne (brother)

Rugby union career
- Position(s): Wing, Fullback
Senior career
| Years | Team | Apps | (Points) |
| 2024– | Leinster | 13 | (30) |
International career
| Years | Team | Apps | (Points) |
| 2022–2023 | Ireland U20 | 7 | (10) |
| 2024– | Emerging Ireland / Ireland A | | |

Andrew Osborne (born 16 August 2003) is an Irish rugby union player who plays on the wing and at fullback. He is contracted to Leinster Rugby and has represented Ireland U20 as well as Emerging Ireland and Ireland A.

== Early life ==
Osborne grew up in Naas, County Kildare, and began playing rugby with Naas RFC minis. He attended Naas C.B.S. His older brother, Jamie Osborne, also plays for Leinster and Ireland.

== Professional career ==
=== Leinster ===
Osborne was named in the Leinster side to face Zebre Parma on 30 March 2024, lining up alongside his brother Jamie in the back three. He scored a try on his senior debut in a 31–7 victory.

As of mid‑2025, Osborne had scored five tries for Leinster and was nominated for Try of the Year for a solo effort against Connacht. He was promoted to Leinster's senior squad ahead of the 2025–26 season.

=== Ireland ===
Osborne represented the Ireland U20s during their 2022 Grand Slam campaign, scoring a try against Scotland at Scotstoun. In 2024, he toured South Africa with Emerging Ireland, starting at fullback in matches against the Cheetahs and Western Force.

== Personal life ==
Osborne comes from a rugby family. His parents Joe and Fiona, and brothers Jack, Adam, Will, and Jamie are all involved with Naas RFC. His father coached him at underage level.
