= Brian Gleeson (rugby union) =

Irish rugby player (born 2004)

- Born: 5 February 2004 (age 22)
- Height: 1.93 m (6 ft 4 in)
- Weight: 116 kg (256 lb)
- School: Rockwell College

Rugby union career
- Position: Back row
- Current team: Munster
Senior career
Years	Team	Apps	(Points)
2023-	Munster	43	(30)
- Correct as of 31 October 2026
International career
Years	Team	Apps	(Points)
2023-2024	Ireland U20	9	(20)
2026-	Ireland A	1	(5)

Brian Gleeson (born 5 February 2004) is an Irish rugby union player who plays as a lock for United Rugby Championship club Munster.

== Early life ==
From Loughmore, in County Tipperary, Gleeson attended Rockwell College. As a member of Loughmore-Castleiney GAA club, Gleeson played age group level hurling for Tipperary prior to concentrating on rugby union.

== Club career ==
Gleeson played rugby union for Thurles RFC, Rockwell College and Garryowen FC, and joined the Munster Rugby academy in 2023. He made his senior Munster debut against the Sharks in the opening game of the United Rugby Championship's 2023–24 season. In 2023, Gleeson was nominated For RTÉ Young Sportsperson Of The Year Award.

Despite missing a chunk of the 2025–26 season with an elbow injury that required surgery, Gleeson signed a new two and-a-half year contract with Munster in January 2026.

== International career ==
A former skipper of the Ireland national under-20 rugby union team, Gleeson won a grand slam at the 2023 Six Nations Under 20s Championship. He represented Ireland U20 at the 2023 World Rugby U20 Championship.

Gleeson was called up to the senior Ireland national team under head coach Andy Farrell in autumn 2025 ahead of an international tour to the United States but had to pull-out after suffering a broken elbow. Gleeson was a try-scorer for Irish Wolfhounds against England A in February 2026.
