= Sam Harris (rugby union, born 2003) =

English rugby union player

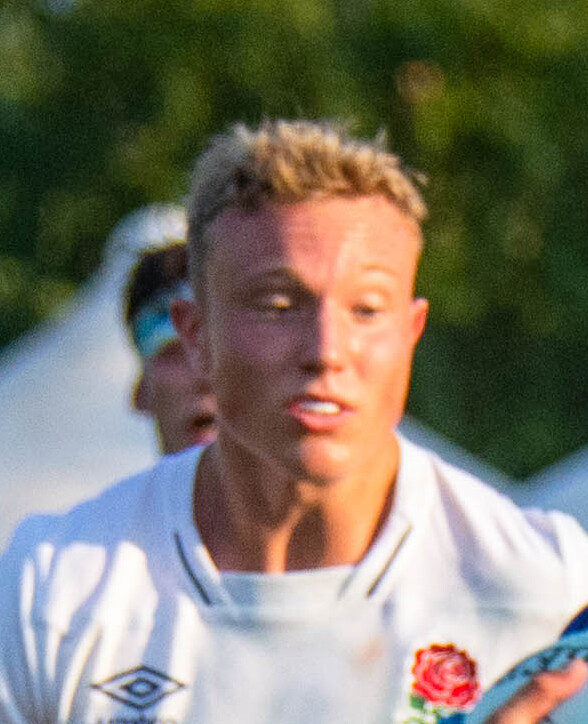
- Harris in 2022
- Born: 3 September 2003 (age 23)
- Height: 1.84 m (6 ft 1/2 in)
- Weight: 95 kg (15.0 st; 209 lb)
- School: Millfield
- University: University of Bath

Rugby union career
- Position(s): Fly-half, Fullback
Senior career
Years	Team	Apps	(Points)
2023–2026	Bath	15	(24)
2026–	Exeter Chiefs	0	(0)
- Correct as of 25 May 2025
International career
Years	Team	Apps	(Points)
2021–2022	England U18s	3	(7)
2022–2023	England U20s	12	(55)
- Correct as of 14 July 2023

Sam Harris (born 3 September 2003) is an English professional rugby union player who plays as a fly-half or full-back for Bath.

== Early life ==
Having attended school at Millfield, Harris went on to study economics at the University of Bath.

== Club career ==
Harris move from the Bath U18 side into the senior academy in the summer of 2022. Harris made his professional debut for Bath Rugby during the 2022-23 season, in the Premiership Rugby Cup against Gloucester. He was named Bath Rugby’s Breakthrough Player of the Year in July 2023.

He continued to play for Bath in the Premiership Rugby Cup at the start of the 2023-24 season. Harris made his first Premiership start for Bath away against Leicester Tigers on 31 December 2023 and registered a conversion.

Having made 12 appearances for Bath, he signed a new two-and-a-half-year contract with the club in February 2024. Harris missed a large part of 2025 with a knee injury.

On 31 March 2026, Harris would join West County rivals Exeter Chiefs on a two-year deal in the Premiership from the 2026-27 season.

== International career ==
Harris has represented England at U18, U19 and U20 level. He scored a try for England U20 against Italy in the 2023 Six Nations Under 20s Championship. Later that year he represented England at the 2023 World Rugby U20 Championship and scored a try during their semi-final defeat against France.

In February 2024, he was called up to the England A team.
