= Luca Giannini =

Welsh rugby union player

- Born: Gianluca Giannini; 17 June 2004 (age 22) Swansea, Wales
- Height: 185 cm (6 ft 1 in)
- Weight: 102 kg (16 st 1 lb; 225 lb)
- School: St John Lloyd Comprehensive

Rugby union career
- Position: Flanker
- Current team: Swansea RFC
Youth career
- Llanelli Wanderers
Senior career
Years	Team	Apps	(Points)
2021–2023	Llanelli	11	(15)
2022–2024	Scarlets	1	(0)
2023–2024	Llandovery	3	(0)
2024–	Swansea	0	(0)
- Correct as of 15 June 2024
International career
Years	Team	Apps	(Points)
2022	Wales U18		
2023–	Wales U20	5	(0)
- Correct as of 13 May 2024

Luca Giannini (born 17 June 2004) is a Welsh rugby union player who previously played for the Scarlets as a flanker.

== Professional career ==
Giannini began playing for local side Llanelli Wanderers RFC, and played for Llanelli Schools U15 and Scarlets U16. A captain for the Scarlets U18 side, Giannini made his first appearance for Llanelli RFC in 2021.

In 2022, Giannini was selected for Wales U18.

Giannini made his debut for the Scarlets on 24 September 2022 against Ulster. Coming off the bench, Giannini became the second youngest player to represent the Scarlets.

Giannini was selected for Wales U20 in 2023, making his first appearance in a friendly against Poland. He was subsequently named in the full squad for the 2023 Six Nations Under 20s Championship. On 3 February 2022, he made his first appearance, starting against Ireland. He made four appearances during the tournament. Giannini was named in the squad for the 2024 Six Nations Under 20s Championship, and appeared in one match, against France.

Giannini was released by the Scarlets at the end of the 2023–24 United Rugby Championship season. He subsequently joined Swansea RFC ahead of the inaugural Super Rygbi Cymru season.
