= James McNabney =

Irish rugby union player

- Born: 28 February 2003 (age 23) Ballymena, County Antrim, Northern Ireland
- Height: 1.95 m (6 ft 5 in)
- Weight: 118 kg (18.6 st; 260 lb)
- School: Cambridge House Grammar School

Rugby union career
- Position(s): Flanker, number eight
Amateur team(s)
Years	Team	Apps	(Points)
2023-	City of Armagh	11	(10)
- Correct as of 28 August 2025
Senior career
Years	Team	Apps	(Points)
2023–	Ulster	24	(5)
- Correct as of 24 October 2026
International career
Years	Team	Apps	(Points)
2022-23	Ireland U20	14	(20)
2026-	Ireland	1	(0)
- Correct as of 14 November 2026

James McNabney (born 28 February 2003) is an Irish rugby union player who plays in the back row for Ulster.

== Early life ==
Born in Ballymena, County Antrim, McNabney attended Cambridge House Grammar School, where he excelled at mounted games, representing Northern Ireland at the Royal Windsor Horse Show, as well as rugby. At club level, he played for City of Armagh in the All-Ireland League.

== Club career ==
As a rugby player he represented Ulster at under-18, under-19 under-20 and 'A' level. He joined the Ulster academy in 2022.

He made three appearances for Ulster 2023–24 including one in the Champions Cup, and signed a development contract in 2024. He made 17 appearances for Ulster in the 2024-25 season.

== International career ==
He represented Ireland at under-20 level, winning four caps in the Grand Slam-winning 2022 under-20 Six Nations campaign, two in the 2022 u20 Summer Series, five in the 2023 under-20 Six Nations, and three in the 2023 World Rugby U20 Championship.

He was called up as a training panellist for Ireland's 2025 Six Nations Championship squad, and was upgraded to a senior contract in 2025. He was again named as a training panellist for Ireland's 2025 summer tests, but was ruled out with an anterior cruciate ligament injury.

In October 2026, he was called up again to senior side ahead of the 2026 Nations Championship November fixtures. He made his debut from the bench against Fiji in November 2026.
