= Joe McCarthy (rugby union) =

Irish rugby union player (born 2001)

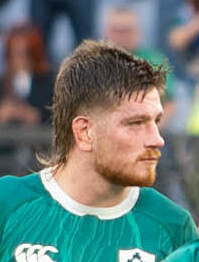
- McCarthy in 2025
- Born: 26 March 2001 (age 25) Manhattan, New York, U.S.
- Height: 1.98 m (6 ft 6 in)
- Weight: 124 kg (273 lb; 19 st 7 lb)
- School: Blackrock College
- University: Trinity College, Dublin
- Notable relative: Paddy McCarthy

Rugby union career
- Position: Lock
- Current team: Leinster
Senior career
Years	Team	Apps	(Points)
2022–	Leinster	57	(30)
- Correct as of 17 January 2026
International career
Years	Team	Apps	(Points)
2020	Ireland U20	3	(0)
2022	Ireland Wolfhounds	1	(0)
2022–	Ireland	28	(15)
2025	British & Irish Lions	1	(0)
- Correct as of 21 November 2026

Joe McCarthy (born 26 March 2001) is an Irish professional rugby union player who plays as a lock for United Rugby Championship club Leinster, and represents Ireland at international level.

== Early life ==
McCarthy was born in Manhattan, New York to Irish parents who had moved there for work; the family returned to Ireland when McCarthy was three years old.

== Professional career ==
=== Leinster ===
McCarthy was named in the Leinster Rugby academy for the 2021–22 season. He made his debut in Round 11 of the 2021–22 United Rugby Championship against Cardiff.

=== Ireland ===
McCarthy was included in the Ireland squad for the June 2022 tour of New Zealand. He made his international debut off the bench in the 60th minute of a 13–10 win over Australia. In August 2023 he was named in the Ireland squad for the 2023 Rugby World Cup.

McCarthy was selected for Ireland's 2024 Six Nations squad. He won the Player of the Match award in the 2024 Six Nations Championship opener in Marseille where Ireland beat France, 38–17.

== Personal life ==
His younger brother is fellow rugby union player Paddy McCarthy.
