= Fintan Gunne =

Irish rugby union player (born 2003)

- Born: Fintan Gunne; 28 July 2003 (age 23) Dublin, Ireland
- Height: 1.75 m (5 ft 9 in)
- Weight: 85 kg (13.4 st; 187 lb)
- School: St Michael's College, Dublin
- University: University College Dublin

Rugby union career
- Position: Scrum‑half
Senior career
Years	Team	Apps	(Points)
2023–	Leinster	28	(10)
- Correct as of 21 March 2026
International career
Years	Team	Apps	(Points)
2023–2024	Ireland U20	9	(20)
2025–	Ireland A	2	(0)
- Correct as of 05 February 2026

Fintan Gunne (born 28 July 2003) is an Irish rugby union player who plays as a scrum‑half for Leinster. He has represented Ireland at under‑20 and 'A' levels.

== Early life ==
Gunne began his rugby at Old Belvedere RFC and featured in the Leinster under‑18s and under‑19s teams. He attended St Michael's College, Dublin before moving on to Terenure RFC in the All‑Ireland League while studying commerce at University College Dublin.

== Professional career ==
=== Leinster ===
Gunne joined the Leinster Academy ahead of the 2023–24 season and signed his first senior contract in March 2025. His senior debut came during the 2023–24 United Rugby Championship.

He was named among the replacements in the 2025 URC Final and scored a late try in Leinster's 32–7 defeat of the Bulls. As of June 2025, Gunne has made 16 appearances for Leinster, scoring 5 points (one try).

== International career ==
Gunne was selected for the Ireland U20 team during the 2023 Six Nations, earning nine caps and scoring twenty points. He made his Ireland A debut in 2025.

== Honours ==
Leinster

- United Rugby Championship
  - Winner (1): 2024-25

Ireland Under 20's

- Six Nations Under 20s Championship:
  - Winner (1): 2023
- Grand Slam:
  - Winner (1): 2023
- Triple Crown:
  - Winner (1): 2023
