= Ciarán Frawley =

Ireland international rugby union player

- Born: 4 December 1997 (age 28) Sydney, New South Wales, Australia
- Height: 1.91 m (6 ft 3 in)
- Weight: 91 kg (201 lb; 14 st 5 lb)
- School: Skerries Community College
- University: University College Dublin

Rugby union career
- Position(s): Centre, Fly-half, Fullback
- Current team: Connacht
Amateur team(s)
Years	Team	Apps	(Points)
2015–2016	Skerries	8	(42)
2016–	UCD	15	(82)
- Correct as of 2 February 2024
Senior career
Years	Team	Apps	(Points)
2018–2026	Leinster	123	(314)
2026-present	Connacht	4	(32)
- Correct as of 24 October 2026
International career
Years	Team	Apps	(Points)
2017	Ireland U20	10	(8)
2022	Ireland A	3	(11)
2023–	Ireland	17	(22)
- Correct as of 14 November 2026

Ciarán Frawley (born 4 December 1997) is an Irish professional rugby union player who plays as a fly-half or centre for United Rugby Championship club Connacht and the Ireland national team.

== Early life ==
Born in Sydney, Australia, to Irish emigrant parents, Frawley returned to Ireland aged 3. Growing up in Skerries, County Dublin, Frawley played for his local Skerries RFC side and at Schools level with Skerries Community College.

At club level, Frawley led Skerries to an All-Ireland Under-17 club title in 2014.

Frawley broke into the Skerries RFC AIL team in late 2015, debuting on his eighteenth birthday before moving to UCD in 2016 when beginning his studies there.

== Club career ==
=== Leinster ===
Having come up through the province's Youths system, via the 'Clubs' section, Frawley joined the Leinster Rugby academy ahead of the 2017–18 season. Unusually, he also made his senior debut during his first year in the academy, coming on as a first-half substitute against the Scarlets in February 2018. Frawley scored a fine touchline conversion with his first kick and later added a penalty. He made two more appearances during the 2017–18 season, including a man-of-the-match performance against the Southern Kings which yielded 14 points from the boot and a first senior try.

In addition to his first team endeavours, Frawley started at out-half as Leinster 'A' won the inaugural Celtic Cup in October 2018, beating the Scarlets Premiership Select 15–8 in a tight final away from home in Llanelli - completing seven victories out of seven in the competition.

Frawley made 11 appearances during the 2018-19 Pro14 season, scoring 58 points. This tally included a crucial try in a drawn game with Benetton on 6 April 2018.

Frawley made his European Champions Cup debut on 14 December 2019, coming off the bench and scoring two conversions in a 50–21 win over the Northampton Saints. Making 12 appearances across all competitions in the 2019–2020 season, Frawley scored one try in a bonus-point win over Connacht in the Pro 14 on 4 January 2020.

Increasingly being used as an inside centre, Frawley made nine appearances in the 2020–21 season. His sole try came away to Montpellier in the European Rugby Champions Cup on 12 December 2020.

Attracting increasing plaudits and attention, Frawley was named man-of-the-match in a United Rugby Championship game versus Scarlets on 16 October 2021. He would score his first try of the season on 22 January 2022, coming off the bench to dot down versus Bath at The Rec. A facial injury requiring surgery suffered against Edinburgh forced Frawley out of a number of matches but he returned to score a try and pick up the man-of-the-match reward versus Connacht on 26 March 2022. In June 2022 he was named Leinster's 2021–22 Supporter's Player of the Year.

=== Connacht ===
In December 2025, Connacht announced the signing of Frawley ahead of the 2026/27 season. He made his debut for Connacht on 2 October 2026 against Benetton away in a URC round 2 match, scoring 2 tries, including the match winning try.

== International career ==
=== Ireland ===
Having previously represented his country at under-18 'club' and under-19 level, Frawley was selected for the Ireland U-20s ahead of the 2017 Six Nations Under 20s Championship. He featured in all five games as Ireland finished fourth. Frawley was also part of the Irish team which finished ninth in the 2017 World Rugby Under 20 Championship, playing all five games and scoring a try versus Samoa.

Frawley received his first Ireland call-up for the 2021 Autumn Internationals but did not make an appearance. He was included in the Ireland squad for the July 2022 tour of New Zealand. and started at fly-half in the first game against the New Zealand Maori.
