= Hugh Cooney =

Irish rugby union player

- Born: Hugh Cooney; 26 June 2003 (age 23) County Dublin, Ireland
- School: Blackrock College

Rugby union career
- Position: Centre
Senior career
Years	Team	Apps	(Points)
2024–	Leinster	15	(5)
- Correct as of 29 October 2026
International career
Years	Team	Apps	(Points)
2023–2024	Ireland U20	6	(10)
- Correct as of 16 June 2025

Hugh Cooney (born 26 June 2003) is an Irish rugby union player who plays as a centre for Leinster Rugby. He has also represented Ireland U20 at international level.

== Early life ==
Cooney was born in County Dublin and attended Blackrock College. He was part of the school's rugby programme and won the 2022 Leinster Schools Senior Cup, scoring 2 tries in the final.

== Professional career ==
=== Leinster ===
Cooney joined the Leinster Rugby academy ahead of the 2024–25 season. He made his senior debut for Leinster in the 2024–25 United Rugby Championship season.

As of June 2025, he has made 5 senior appearances for Leinster.

=== International ===
Cooney was selected for the Ireland U20 squad for the 2023 Six Nations Under 20s Championship, making six appearances and scoring ten points.

== Honours ==
Leinster

- United Rugby Championship
  - Winner (2): 2024-25, 2025-26

Ireland Under 20's

- Six Nations Under 20s Championship:
  - Winner (1): 2023
- Grand Slam:
  - Winner (1): 2023
- Triple Crown:
  - Winner (1): 2023
