= John Devine (rugby union) =

Irish rugby union player

- Born: 26 December 2003 (age 22) Ballinasloe, County Galway
- Height: 1.86 m (6 ft 1 in)
- Weight: 99 kg (15 st 8 lb)
- School: Garbally College
- Notable relative: Michael Devine (Father) Matthew Devine (Brother)

Rugby union career
- Position: Centre
- Current team: Connacht
Amateur team(s)
Years	Team	Apps	(Points)
- Galway Corinthians RFC
Senior career
Years	Team	Apps	(Points)
2022–	Connacht	10	(5)
- Correct as of 24 October 2026
International career
Years	Team	Apps	(Points)
2023	Ireland U20	10	(5)

John Devine (born 26 December 2003) is an Irish rugby union player for Connacht in the URC. Devine’s primary position is Centre.

== Connacht ==
Devine was named as a member of the Connacht academy for the 2022-23 season. He made his debut for Connacht in Round 3 of the 2025-26 EPCR Challenge Cup against Montpellier. On 29 January 2026, it was announced that Devine had signed a new contract with Connacht Rugby keeping him at the club until at least the end of the 2026/2027 season. He scored his first try for Connacht against Stormers at the DHL Stadium in Cape Town on 18 April 2026.
