= Diarmuid Mangan =

Irish rugby union player

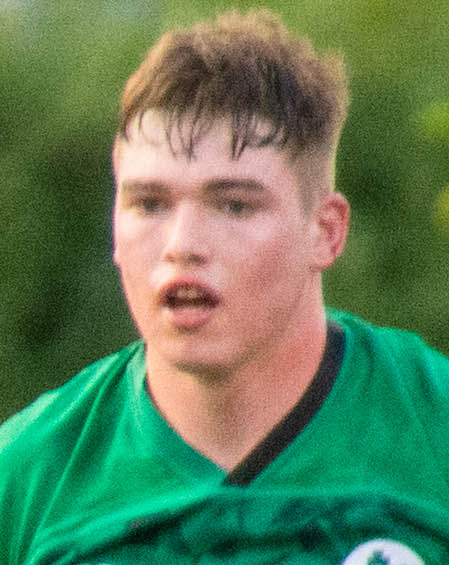
- Mangan in 2022
- Born: 6 March 2003 (age 23) County Kildare
- Height: 1.97 m (6 ft 5 1/2 in)
- Weight: 109 kg (17.2 st; 240 lb)
- School: Newbridge College
- University: University College Dublin

Rugby union career
- Position: Back-row
Amateur team(s)
Years	Team	Apps	(Points)
- Naas RFC
- UCD RFC
Senior career
Years	Team	Apps	(Points)
2022–	Leinster	27	(5)
- Correct as of 31 January 2026
International career
Years	Team	Apps	(Points)
2022-	Ireland U20		
2025-	Ireland A	1	(0)
- Correct as of 8 November 2025

Diarmuid Mangan is an Irish rugby union player who plays as a back row forward for Leinster Rugby and Ireland U20.

== Early life ==
From Sallins, Mangan played as a youngster for Naas RFC. He was a graduate of Newbridge College in County Kildare. He attended University College Dublin to study commerce.

== Career ==
He joined the Leinster academy ahead of the 2022–23 season. In September 2023 he made a try-scoring debut for the senior Leinster team against Munster.

== International career ==
Mangan was a part of the 2022 and 2023 grand slam winning Ireland U20 squads. He was named in the Ireland squad for the 2023 World Rugby Under 20 Championship held in South Africa in June and July 2023. During the pool stages of the tournament he scored a try in a 30–10 win against Australia in Paarl. He also captained the team during the tournament.

In October 2025, he was called up to the Ireland Wolfhounds squad for their match against Spain during the 2025 November internationals, and was subsequently named as a replacement for the match.

== Style of play ==
Mangan has topped the U20 Six Nations stats for ball carrying. Whilst being named in a World School's XV he was compared to Tadhg Beirne, Iain Henderson, and Courtney Lawes in November 2021.

== Honours ==
Leinster

- United Rugby Championship
  - Winner (1): 2024-25

Ireland Under 20's

- Six Nations Under 20s Championship:
  - Winner (1): 2023
- Grand Slam:
  - Winner (1): 2023
- Triple Crown:
  - Winner (1): 2023

== Personal life ==
His brother Ciarán Mangan is also a professional rugby union player for Leinster.
