= Jamie Osborne (rugby union) =

Irish rugby union player

- Born: 16 November 2001 (age 24) County Kildare, Ireland
- Height: 1.92 m (6 ft 4 in)
- Weight: 95 kg (209 lb; 14 st 13 lb)
- School: Naas C.B.S.

Rugby union career
- Position(s): Fullback, Centre, Wing
- Current team: Leinster
Senior career
Years	Team	Apps	(Points)
2021 –	Leinster	77	(80)
- Correct as of 28 June 2026
International career
Years	Team	Apps	(Points)
2021	Ireland U-20	5	(10)
2022	Ireland Wolfhounds	1	(0)
2024 –	Ireland	19	(30)
2025	British & Irish Lions	0	(0)
- Correct as of 14 November 2026

Jamie Osborne (born 16 November 2001) is an Irish professional rugby union player who plays primarily as a centre for United Rugby Championship club Leinster, and also plays for the Ireland national rugby union team.

== Professional career ==
=== Leinster ===
Osborne was named in the Leinster side for the rearranged Round 8 of the 2020–21 Pro14 against the Scarlets. He made his debut in the same match, coming on as a replacement.

=== Ireland ===
Osborne was named in the Ireland squad for the 2023 Six Nations Championship.

Osborne was named in the Ireland squad for the 2024 two-test Summer tour to South Africa. He made his debut in the first test at fullback, a position he had not played in since two seasons prior. He was named in the Ireland squad ahead of the 2024 Autumn Nations Series.

He was named in the senior training squad for the 2025 Six Nations. In February 2025, he was named in the starting lineup to make his tournament debut against Wales.

=== British & Irish Lions ===
Following a knee injury to Scotland full back Blair Kinghorn, Osborne was called into the British & Irish Lions squad for the 2025 tour to Australia to provide injury cover.
