= Max Deegan =

Irish rugby union player (born 1996)

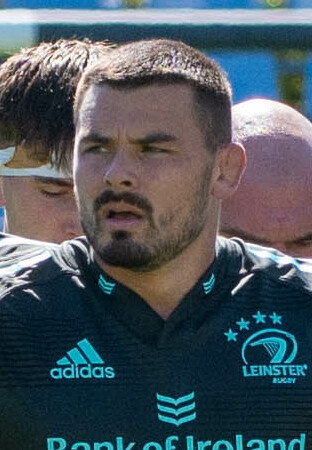
- Deegan in 2022
- Born: 1 October 1996 (age 30) Dublin, Ireland
- Height: 1.93 m (6 ft 4 in)
- Weight: 108 kg (17.0 st; 238 lb)
- School: St Michael's College
- University: University College Dublin

Rugby union career
- Position(s): Number 8, Flanker
Amateur team(s)
Years	Team	Apps	(Points)
- Lansdowne
Senior career
Years	Team	Apps	(Points)
2016–	Leinster	152	(210)
- Correct as of 21 March 2026
International career
Years	Team	Apps	(Points)
2016	Ireland U20	9	(15)
2020–	Ireland	4	(0)
2022-	Ireland A	5	(5)
- Correct as of 05 February 2026

Max Deegan (born 1996) is an Irish rugby union player for United Rugby Championship and European Rugby Champions Cup side Leinster. He plays primarily as a number 8, though can also play at flanker.

== Leinster ==
Deegan was promoted to Leinster's senior squad ahead of the 2017–18 season, having made three appearances for the province during the previous season.

== Ireland ==
Deegan was named Player of the Tournament for his part in helping Ireland Under-20s reach their first ever final during the 2016 World Rugby Under 20 Championship. Deegan received his first call up to the senior Ireland squad on 15 January 2020 for the 2020 Six Nations Championship and gained his first senior cap against Wales on the 8 February 2020. In 2022, Deegan captained two of Emerging Ireland's three tour matches in South Africa scoring one try.
