= Gus McCarthy =

Ireland international rugby union player

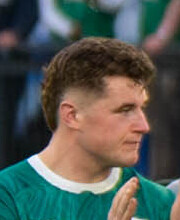
- McCarthy in 2025
- Born: 23 July 2003 (age 23) Ranelagh, Dublin
- Height: 188 cm (6 ft 2 in)
- Weight: 107 kg (236 lb)
- School: Blackrock College

Rugby union career
- Position: Hooker
- Current team: Leinster
Senior career
Years	Team	Apps	(Points)
2024-	Leinster	24	(5)
- Correct as of 28 February 2026
International career
Years	Team	Apps	(Points)
2023	Ireland U20	10	(20)
2024–	Ireland	7	(15)
2026-	Ireland A	1	(0)
- Correct as of 05 February 2026

Gus McCarthy (born 23 July 2003) is an Irish rugby union player who plays as a hooker for Leinster Rugby and for the Ireland national rugby union team.

== Early life ==
McCarthy was born on Rugby Road in Ranelagh, but his family moved to Blackrock, Dublin shortly after he was born. He played a number of sports growing up, including golf in Elm Park, mini rugby in Old Belvedere, Gaelic Football with Kilmacud Crokes and tennis in Blackrock Bowling & Tennis club. He attended Blackrock College and captained their rugby side to the Leinster Schools Cup in 2022. McCarthy has two sisters and a brother.

== Club career ==
Gus made his debut for Leinster Rugby in April 2024 away in South Africa against Stormers. He made his first start for the club in the United Rugby Championship against Edinburgh in September 2024. He became a regular starter for the club at the start of the 2024–25 season.

== International career ==
McCarthy captained the Ireland U20 side to the 2023 U20 Six Nations grand slam. That same year he captained the Ireland U20 side to final of the World Rugby U20 Championship in Cape Town, South Africa, where the team placed second overall. The following year he toured with the Emerging Ireland squad.

In October 2024 he was called up to the senior Ireland squad as a training panellist. In November 2024, he made his debut in a 52–17 win against Fiji scoring a try in the 2024 Autumn Nations Series. The following week, he scored for the first time off the bench with a try in 22–19 win over Australia on the 150th anniversary of the IRFU.

In February 2025, during the 2025 Six Nations, he was named on the bench to make his tournament debut against Wales, coming on in the 75th minute to replace Dan Sheehan.

== Honours ==
Leinster

- United Rugby Championship
  - Winner (1): 2024-25

Ireland Under 20's

- Six Nations Under 20s Championship:
  - Winner (1): 2023
- Grand Slam:
  - Winner (1): 2023
- Triple Crown:
  - Winner (1): 2023
