= Ireland Wolfhounds =

Irish rugby union team

- Union: Irish Rugby Football Union
- Emblem: the Shamrock
- Ground(s): Donnybrook Stadium; Ravenhill Stadium; The Sportsground; Thomond Park; Musgrave Park
- Coach: Cullie Tucker
- Captain: Max Deegan
1st kit	2nd kit

First match
- Ireland XV 3–4 France (26 January 1946)

Largest win
- Ireland XV 60–3 Scotland A (01 March 2002)

Largest defeat
- Ireland XV 7–67 Scotland A (22 February 2008)

The Ireland Wolfhounds (variously branded as Ireland Wolfhounds, Ireland A, Ireland B and Ireland XV) are the second national rugby union team of Ireland, behind the Ireland national team.

== History ==
The Wolfounds previously competed in the Churchill Cup together with the England Saxons, the national teams of Canada and the United States, as well as a selection of other nations' 1st, 2nd and 3rd representative sides (including Scotland A and the New Zealand Māori). They also played against other Six Nations countries' A sides during the Six Nations. They have intermittently played touring sides, namely South Africa in 2000, the All Blacks in 2001 and Australia in 2006. On the 21 June 2009, Ireland A won their first Churchill Cup, beating England A 49–22 in the final. They also won the Churchill Plate three times in 2006, 2007 and 2008. Initially named Ireland B, the side was redesignated to Ireland A from the 1992–1993 season. They were once again renamed the Ireland Wolfhounds in January 2010. This name was inspired by a nomadic invitational side, which competed between 1956 and 1987 against other club sides throughout Ireland. The Wolfhounds have not competed in a competition since the IRFU declined to compete in the 2016 World Rugby Tbilisi Cup. Ireland A played their first match in over seven years against the All Blacks XV in November 2022 at the RDS Arena, Dublin losing 19–47.

== Squad ==
On 29 October, Ireland named their 'XV' squad for their match against Fiji 'A' on 20 November 2026.

The number of caps in the table below represents caps earned for the senior Ireland national team.

Head Coach: (Ireland) Mark Sexton

Player	Position	Date of birth (age)	Caps	Club/province
Eoin de Buitléar	Hooker	9 November 2001 (age 25)	0	(Ireland) Connacht
Gus McCarthy (c)	Hooker	23 July 2003 (age 23)	7	(Ireland) Leinster
Jack Aungier	Prop	20 November 1998 (age 28)	1	(Ireland) Munster
Kieran Brookes	Prop	29 August 1990 (age 36)	16( (England) )	(Ireland) Munster
Michael Milne	Prop	5 February 1999 (age 27)	5	(Ireland) Munster
Alex Usanov	Prop	10 July 2005 (age 21)	0	(Ireland) Leinster
Tom Ahern	Lock	22 February 2000 (age 26)	2	(Ireland) Munster
Edwin Edogbo	Lock	21 December 2002 (age 23)	1	(Ireland) Munster
Conor O'Tighearnaigh	Lock	2 April 2003 (age 23)	0	(Ireland) Leinster
Paul Boyle	Back row	14 January 1997 (age 29)	1	(Ireland) Connacht
Will Connors	Back row	4 April 1996 (age 30)	9	(Ireland) Connacht
Sean Edogbo	Back row	8 May 2004 (age 22)	0	(Ireland) Munster
Brian Gleeson	Back row	5 February 2004 (age 22)	0	(Ireland) Munster
Cormac Izuchukwu	Back row	28 January 2000 (age 26)	5	(Ireland) Ulster
David McCann	Back row	20 June 2000 (age 26)	0	(Ireland) Ulster
Scott Penny	Back row	22 September 1999 (age 27)	0	(Ireland) Leinster
Matthew Devine	Scrum-half	19 February 2002 (age 24)	0	(Ireland) Ulster
Fintan Gunne	Scrum-half	28 July 2003 (age 23)	0	(Ireland) Leinster
Joey Carbery	Fly-half	1 November 1995 (age 31)	38	(Ireland) Leinster
Jack Murphy	Fly-half	15 July 2004 (age 22)	0	(Ireland) Ulster
Cathal Forde	Centre	11 April 2001 (age 25)	0	(Ireland) Connacht
James Hume	Centre	7 September 1998 (age 28)	3	(Ireland) Ulster
Dan Kelly	Centre	16 June 2001 (age 25)	1( (England) )	(Ireland) Munster
Harry West	Centre	27 April 2003 (age 23)	0	(Ireland) Connacht
Shay McCarthy	Wing	6 November 2002 (age 24)	0	(Ireland) Munster
Ethan McIlroy	Wing	10 August 2000 (age 26)	0	(Ireland) Ulster
Daniel Ryan	Wing	9 November 2006 (age 20)	0	(Ireland) Connacht
Finn Treacy	Wing	14 August 2004 (age 22)	0	(Ireland) Connacht

== Results ==
=== 1940s ===
Date	Home Team	Result	Away Team	Venue
26 January 1946	Ireland XV	3–4	France	Lansdowne Road, Dublin
6 February 1946	England XV	14–6	Ireland XV	Twickenham, London
9 February 1946	Ireland XV	4–3	England XV	Lansdowne Road, Dublin
23 February 1946	Scotland XV	9–0	Ireland XV	Murrayfield, Edinburgh
9 March 1946	Wales XV	6–4	Ireland XV	Arms Park, Cardiff

=== 1970s ===
Date	Home Team	Result	Away Team	Venue
6 December 1975	Ireland B	9–6	France B	Lansdowne Road, Dublin
4 December 1976	France B	16–3	Ireland B	Dijon
4 December 1976	Scotland B	3–7	Ireland B	Murrayfield, Edinburgh
1 December 1979	Ireland B	13–20	Scotland B	Lansdowne Road, Dublin

=== 1980s ===
Date	Home Team	Result	Away Team	Venue
6 December 1980	England B	20–15	Ireland B	Twickenham, London
4 December 1982	Ireland B	6–10	England B	Ravenhill, Belfast
3 December 1983	Scotland B	22–13	Ireland B	Murrayfield, Edinburgh
1 December 1984	Ireland B	23–20	Scotland B	The Sportsground, Galway
2 September 1989	Canada	21–24	Ireland XV	Centennial Stadium, Victoria
9 September 1989	United States	7–32	Ireland XV	Downing Stadium, New York City
9 December 1989	Scotland B	22–22	Ireland B	Murrayfield, Edinburgh

=== 1990s ===
Date	Home Team	Result	Away Team	Venue
20 October 1990	Ireland B	27–12	Argentina	Thomond Park, Limerick
22 December 1990	Ireland B	16–0	Scotland B	Ravenhill, Belfast
1 March 1991	Ireland B	24–10	England B	Donnybrook, Dublin
28 December 1991	Scotland B	19–29	Ireland B	Murrayfield, Edinburgh
31 January 1992	England B	47–15	Ireland B	Richmond, London
28 December 1992	Ireland A	13―22	Scotland A	Lansdowne Road, Dublin
5 March 1993	Wales A	32―29	Ireland A	Newport
19 March 1993	Ireland A	18―22	England A	Donnybrook, Dublin
28 December 1993	Scotland A	24―9	Ireland A	Ayr
4 February 1994	Ireland A	10―20	Wales A	Donnybrook, Dublin
18 February 1994	England A	29―10	Ireland A	Richmond, London
20 January 1995	Ireland A	20―21	England A	Donnybrook, Dublin
3 February 1995	Scotland A	24―18	Ireland A	Myreside, Edinburgh
17 March 1995	Ireland A	19―30	Wales A	Pontypridd
19 January 1996	Ireland A	26―19	Scotland A	Donnybrook, Dublin
1 March 1996	Ireland A	25―11	Wales A	Donnybrook, Dublin
15 March 1996	England A	56―26	Ireland A	Richmond, London
12 November 1996	Ireland A	28―25	South Africa A	Donnybrook, Dublin
17 January 1997	Ireland A	23―44	France A	Donnybrook, Dublin
31 January 1997	Emerging Wales	34―14	Ireland A	Pontypridd
14 February 1997	Ireland A	30―44	England A	Donnybrook, Dublin
28 February 1997	Scotland A	33―34	Ireland A	Myreside, Edinburgh
22 May 1997	Northland	69―16	Ireland A	Whangārei
26 May 1997	New Zealand Academy	74―15	Ireland A	North Harbour Stadium, Albany
29 May 1997	Bay of Plenty	52―39	Ireland A	Rotorua International Stadium, Rotorua
1 June 1997	Thames Valley	12―38	Ireland A	Paeroa
6 June 1997	King Country	32―26	Ireland A	Owen Delany Park, Taupō
10 June 1997	New Zealand Māori	41―10	Ireland A	Oval Grounds, Palmerston North
14 June 1997	Samoa	57―25	Ireland A	Apia Park, Apia
26 November 1997	Ireland A	26―10	Canada	Ravenhill, Belfast
6 February 1998	Ireland A	9―11	Scotland A	Donnybrook, Dublin
6 March 1998	France A	30―30	Ireland A	Quimper
20 March 1998	Ireland A	27―42	Wales A	Thomond Park, Limerick
3 April 1998	England A	40―30	Ireland A	Richmond, London
1 December 1998	Ireland A	19―50	South Africa	Ravenhill, Belfast
5 February 1999	Ireland A	26―25	France A	Donnybrook, Dublin
19 February 1999	Wales A	40―29	Ireland A	Eugene Cross Park, Ebbw Vale
5 March 1999	Ireland A	21―28	England A	Donnybrook, Dublin
19 March 1999	Scotland A	31―21	Ireland A	Myreside, Edinburgh
9 April 1999	Ireland A	73―17	Italy A	Donnybrook, Dublin

=== 2000s ===
Date	Home Team	Result	Away Team	Venue	Attendance
4 February 2000	England A	30―31	Ireland A	Franklin Gardens, Northampton	
18 February 2000	Ireland A	23―21	Scotland A	Donnybrook, Dublin	
3 March 2000	Ireland A	31―3	Italy A	Donnybrook, Dublin	
18 March 2000	France A	31–25	Ireland A	Stade Marcel-Michelin, Clermont-Ferrand	
31 March 2000	Ireland A	28―26	Wales A	Donnybrook, Dublin	
15 November 2000	Ireland A	28–11	South Africa XV	Thomond Park, Limerick	
2 February 2001	Italy A	16–68	Ireland A	Viterbo	
16 February 2001	Ireland A	23–55	France A	Ravenhill, Belfast	
8 November 2001>	Ireland A	23–18	Samoa	Donnybrook, Dublin	
13 November 2001	Ireland A	30–43	New Zealand XV	Ravenhill, Belfast	
2 February 2002	Ireland A	55–22	Wales A	Musgrave Park, Cork	
15 February 2002	England A	18–25	Ireland A	Franklin Gardens, Northampton	
1 March 2002	Ireland A	60–3	Scotland A	Ravenhill, Belfast	
22 March 2002	Ireland A	59–5	Italy A	Donnybrook, Dublin	
5 April 2002	France A	30–20	Ireland A	La Roche-sur-Yon	
15 February 2003	Scotland A	22–22	Ireland A	Bridgehaugh	
21 February 2003	Italy A	11–28	Ireland A		
7 March 2003	Ireland A	19–29	France A	Ravenhill, Belfast	
28 March 2003	Ireland A	24–21	England A	Donnybrook, Dublin	6,000
11 March 2005	Ireland A	15–9	France A	Donnybrook, Dublin	
10 February 2006	France A	20―12	Ireland A	Limoges	
17 March 2006	England A	18–33	Ireland A	Kingsholm, Gloucester	
3 June 2006	United States	13–28	Ireland A	Buck Shaw Stadium, Santa Clara	3,700
10 June 2006	New Zealand Māori	27–6	Ireland A	Buck Shaw Stadium, Santa Clara	
17 June 2006	Ireland A	30―27	England Saxons	Commonwealth Stadium, Edmonton	
15 November 2006	Ireland A	17–24	Australia A	Thomond Park, Limerick	6,500
9 February 2007	Ireland A	5–32	England Saxons	Ravenhill, Belfast	3,528
19 May 2007	Ireland A	39–20	Canada	Sandy Park, Exeter	
29 May 2007	New Zealand Māori	50―22	Ireland A	Sandy Park, Exeter	4,679
2 June 2007	Ireland A	22–21	Scotland A	Twickenham, London	
1 February 2008	England Saxons	31–13	Ireland A	Welford Road, Leicester	
22 February 2008	Scotland A	67–7	Ireland A	McDiarmid Park, Perth	
11 June 2008	Ireland A	46―9	United States	Richardson Memorial Stadium, Kingston	
14 June 2008	Ireland A	12–34	England Saxons	Fletcher's Field, Markham	
21 June 2008	Argentina A	8―33	Ireland A	SeatGeek Stadium, Bridgeview, Illinois	
6 February 2009	Ireland A	P―P	England Saxons	Donnybrook, Dublin	1,500
13 February 2009	Ireland A	35―10	Scotland A	RDS Arena, Dublin	
10 June 2009	Ireland A	30–19	Canada	Infinity Park, Glendale	
14 June 2009	Ireland A	40―5	Georgia	Infinity Park, Glendale	
21 June 2009	England Saxons	22―49	Ireland A	Dick's Sporting Goods Park, Denver	
13 November 2009	Ireland A	48–19	Tonga XV	Ravenhill, Belfast	3,777
27 November 2009	Ireland A	31–0	Argentina Jaguars	Tallaght, Dublin	4,016

=== 2010s ===
Date	Home Team	Result	Away Team	Venue	Attendance
31 January 2010	England Saxons	17–13	Ireland A	Recreation Ground, Bath	
5 February 2010	Ireland Wolfhounds	34–19	Scotland A	Ravenhill, Belfast	2,746
28 January 2011	Scotland A	32–12	Ireland Wolfhounds	Netherdale	
4 February 2011	Ireland Wolfhounds	20–11	England Saxons	Ravenhill, Belfast	2,000
28 January 2012	England Saxons	23–17	Ireland Wolfhounds	Sandy Park, Exeter	
16 November 2012	Ireland XV	53–0	Fiji A	Thomond Park, Limerick	17,126
25 January 2013	Ireland Wolfhounds	10–14	England Saxons	The Sportsground, Galway	
25 January 2014	England Saxons	8–14	Ireland Wolfhounds	Kingsholm Stadium, Gloucester	
30 January 2015	Ireland Wolfhounds	9–18	England Saxons	Musgrave Park, Cork	8,200

=== 2020s ===
Date	Home Team	Result	Away Team	Venue	Attendance
4 November 2022	Ireland A	19–47	All Blacks XV	RDS Arena, Dublin	
23 February 2025	England A	28–12	Ireland A	Ashton Gate, Bristol	
8 November 2025	Spain	24–61	Ireland XV	Estadio Municipal de Butarque, Leganés	11,236
6 February 2026	Ireland A	14–52	England XV	Thomond Park, Limerick	
20 November 2026	Ireland XV	61–12	Fiji Latui	Musgrave Park, Cork	
12 February 2027	Ireland XV		Chile	Queen's University, Belfast	
20 February 2027	England XV		Ireland XV	Sandy Park, Exeter	

== Home record ==
Ireland A Home Record
Facility	Played	Won	Drawn	Lost	% Won
Donnybrook Stadium	19	12	0	7	63.16%
The Sportsground	2	1	0	1	50%
Lansdowne Road	5	2	0	3	40%
Musgrave Park	3	2	0	1	66.67%
Ravenhill Stadium	12	6	0	6	50%
RDS Arena	2	1	0	1	50%
Tallaght Stadium	1	1	0	0	100%
Thomond Park	6	3	0	3	50%
Total	50	28	0	22	56%

Above is the Ireland Wolfhound's home record in each stadium. Up to date as of 20 November 2026.

== Statistics ==
=== Overall ===
Against	Played	Won	Drawn	Lost	For	Against	Diff	% Won
Argentina	1	1	0	0	27	12	+15	100.00%
Argentina Jaguars	2	2	0	0	64	8	+56	100.00%
Australia A	1	0	0	1	17	24	–7	0%
Bay of Plenty (New Zealand)	1	0	0	1	39	52	–13	0%
Canada	4	4	0	0	119	70	+49	100%
England Saxons	30	10	0	20	556	748	–192	33.33%
Fiji	1	1	0	0	53	0	+53	100%
Fiji Latui	1	1	0	0	61	12	+49	100%
France	1	0	0	1	3	4	–1	0%
France A	11	4	1	6	205	295	–90	36.36%
Georgia	1	1	0	0	40	5	+35	100%
Italy A	5	5	0	0	259	52	+207	100%
King Country (New Zealand)	1	0	0	1	26	32	–6	0%
New Zealand Academy	1	0	0	1	15	74	–59	0%
(Māori people) Māori	3	0	0	3	38	118	–80	0%
New Zealand XV	1	0	0	1	30	43	–13	0%
(New Zealand) All Blacks XV	1	0	0	1	19	47	–28	0%
Northland (New Zealand)	1	0	0	1	16	69	–53	0%
Samoa	2	1	0	1	48	75	–27	50%
Scotland A	23	11	2	10	468	474	–6	47.83%
South Africa	1	0	0	1	19	50	—31	0.00%
South Africa A	1	1	0	0	28	25	+3	100%
South Africa XV	1	1	0	0	28	11	+17	100.00%
Spain	1	1	0	0	61	24	+37	100.00%
Thames Valley (New Zealand University)	1	1	0	0	38	12	+26	100%
Tonga XV	1	1	0	0	48	19	+29	100%
United States	3	3	0	0	106	29	+77	100%
Wales A	10	3	0	7	240	263	–23	30%
Total	111	52	3	56	2,671	2,647	+24	46.85%

The above is a list of the Ireland Wolfhounds' head-to-head record against international first and second sides, non-national representative sides such as the New Zealand Māori, as well as some club sides. Up to date as of last match: Ireland XV 61–12 Fiji Latui on 20 November 2026.

== Honours ==
- Six Nations A Championship
  - Winners: 1 (2002)
- Six Nations A Triple Crown
  - Winners: 2 (2000, 2002)
- Churchill Cup
  - Winners: 1 (2009)
- Churchill Plate
  - Winners: 3 (2006, 2007, 2008)
- Melrose Sevens
  - Winners: 1 (1991)

== See also ==
- Ireland national rugby union team
- Emerging Ireland
- Ireland national under-20 rugby union team
- Ireland national schoolboy rugby union team
