= 2024–25 United Rugby Championship =

Rugby union competition season

- Countries: Ireland; Italy; Scotland; South Africa; Wales
- Date: 20 September 2024 – 14 June 2025
- Champions: (Ireland) Leinster (9th title)
- Runners-up: (South Africa) Bulls
- Matches played: 151
- Attendance: 1,832,138 (average 12,133 per match)
- Highest attendance: 80,468 – Leinster vs Munster (12 October 2024)
- Lowest attendance: 1,187 – Zebre vs Lions (19 October 2024)
- Tries scored: 990 (average 6.6 per match)
- Top point scorer: (Scotland) Ross Thompson (128)
- Top try scorer: 6 players tied (9)

Official website
- unitedrugby.com

The 2024–25 United Rugby Championship was the 24th season of the professional rugby union competition currently known as the United Rugby Championship, the highest level domestic rugby competition in South Africa, Ireland, Scotland, Wales and Italy. This season was the fourth season under that name, and the fourth with the current collection of teams. It began on 20 September 2024 and ended on 14 June 2025.

Glasgow Warriors entered as the reigning champions, their second overall title, but were eliminated by Leinster in the semi-finals.

The first confirmed titles of the season were the four URC Regional Shields, which were won by Leinster (Irish Shield), Cardiff (Welsh Shield), Sharks (South African Shield) and Glasgow Warriors (Scottish-Italian Shield) respectively. Leinster's win, their fourth, extended their record within the championship for Shield wins.

During the season, records were set for overall and average attendance, highest attendance for a single game and (twice) highest aggregate attendance across a round of competition. Over 1.8 million fans attended United Rugby Championship matches during the season.

For the first time since the current format was commenced in 2021–22, the top two seeds from the regular season standings, Leinster and Pretoria's Bulls reached the United Rugby Championship Final, on 14 June in Croke Park, Dublin. It was also the first final in the most recent format held outside South Africa.

Leinster defeated the Bulls 32–7 in the grand final to win their ninth overall title, and their first under the current competition format.

== Format ==
The 2024–25 season once again consisted of 21 rounds: 18 rounds of regular season play, followed by three rounds of play-offs. The competition ran from 20 September 2024 to 14 June 2025, with the regular season ending in mid May. The season also contained breaks for the 2024 end-of year internationals, the 2025 Men's Six Nations (though matches are played during 'fallow' weekends) and the various matchdays of the 2024–25 European Rugby Champions Cup and Challenge Cup. The season did not overlap with the summer internationals. Some South African teams played derby matches throughout the Men's Six Nations window, as this is a competition in which the South Africa national team are not involved.

There were four regional pools: The Irish Shield pool (featuring the four Irish teams), the Welsh Shield pool (featuring the four Welsh teams), the South African Shield pool (featuring the four South African teams) and the shared Italian–Scottish Shield pool (featuring the two Italian and two Scottish sides). The pools served two functions; they guaranteed a full slate of home-and-away derby matches for each team (which are often the best attended and most remunerative fixtures for the clubs involved), and they awarded a minor Regional Shield trophy to the top team in each pool, which thereby functioned as a de facto national championship in three of the four pools, and a cross-border regional championship in the Scottish–Italian pool. The winner of each Shield was determined solely from the games played amongst the teams within their regional pool, mirroring the format of the old Interprovincial Championship in Ireland.

Teams therefore played six matches against their regional pool rivals, in a home and away double round-robin. The remaining twelve matches were made up of a full single round robin of the remaining teams, consisting of an even number of six home and six away matches against all the sides from the other pools, with home advantage alternating each year. Generally each team played two of the teams in each of the other pools at home, and two away, with the matches of European teams away to South African teams usually held back to back as an eight-day 'mini-tour' to reduce travel. Each South Africa team played six away fixtures in Europe, again usually constructed around mini-tours of two or three matches.

In Scotland, the two pool games involving both Scottish sides, played back to back over the Christmas and New Year period, also decided the 1872 Cup, effectively a Scottish national professional championship. The two Italian sides have no individual trophy to play for.

For the Championship itself, there was one main league table. The top eight sides in that table at the end of the regular season qualified for the play-offs quarter-finals, followed by semi-finals and a grand final. The playoffs were seeded, with the top four seeds having home advantage at the quarter-final stage. In the semi-finals and final, the better ranked club in each tie had home advantage. The Regional Shield pools had no direct link to the play-offs and by extension the Championship itself, and it was technically possible to win a Regional Shield but not contest the play-offs.

== Teams ==
=== United Rugby Championship ===
Team	Country	Coach / Director of Rugby	Captain	Stadium	Capacity
Benetton	Italy	(Italy) Marco Bortolami	(Zimbabwe) Eli Snyman (Italy) Michele Lamaro	Stadio Comunale di Monigo	5,000
Bulls	South Africa	(South Africa) Jake White	(South Africa) Marcell Coetzee (South Africa) Ruan Nortjé	Loftus Versfeld Stadium	51,762
Cardiff	Wales	(England) Matt Sherratt	(Wales) Liam Belcher	Cardiff Arms Park	12,125
Connacht	Ireland	(England) Peter Wilkins	(Ireland) Cian Prendergast	The Sportsground; MacHale Park	8,129*; 25,369
Dragons	Wales	(Wales) Dai Flanagan	(Wales) Ben Carter	Rodney Parade	8,700
Edinburgh	Scotland	(South Africa) Sean Everitt	(Scotland) Grant Gilchrist (Scotland) Ben Vellacott	Hive Stadium; Murrayfield Stadium	7,800; 67,144
Glasgow Warriors	Scotland	(South Africa) Franco Smith	(Scotland) Kyle Steyn	Scotstoun Stadium; Hampden Park	7,351; 51,866
Leinster	Ireland	(Ireland) Leo Cullen	(Ireland) Caelan Doris	RDS Arena; Aviva Stadium; Croke Park	18,500; 51,700; 82,300
Lions	South Africa	(South Africa) Ivan van Rooyen	(South Africa) Marius Louw	Ellis Park Stadium	62,567
Munster	Ireland	(England) Graham Rowntree	(Ireland) Tadhg Beirne	Thomond Park; Musgrave Park	25,600; 8,008
Ospreys	Wales	(Wales) Mark Jones	(Wales) Jac Morgan	Swansea.com Stadium; Brewery Field	20,827; 8,000
Scarlets	Wales	(Wales) Dwayne Peel	(Wales) Josh Macleod	Parc y Scarlets	14,870
Sharks	South Africa	(New Zealand) John Plumtree	(South Africa) Siya Kolisi	Kings Park Stadium	52,000
Stormers	South Africa	(South Africa) John Dobson	(South Africa) Salmaan Moerat	DHL Stadium; Danie Craven Stadium	55,000; 16,000
Ulster	Ireland	(Ireland) Richie Murphy	(Ireland) Iain Henderson	Ravenhill Stadium	18,196
Zebre Parma	Italy	(Italy) Massimo Brunello	(Italy) Danilo Fischetti	Stadio Sergio Lanfranchi	5,000

=== Locations ===
Location of Irish, Scottish and Welsh teams: 2024–25 United Rugby Championship (the United Kingdom and Ireland)	Location of Italian teams: 2024–25 United Rugby Championship (Northern Italy) Location of South African teams: 2024–25 United Rugby Championship (South Africa)

== Administration of Cardiff Rugby ==
On 9 April 2025, the legal entity behind the Cardiff Rugby team was briefly placed into administration, after promised private funding did not materialise. The Welsh Rugby Union took over the running of the club on the same day, and bought the club's legal entity out of administration the day after, ensuring it continued as a going concern. Unlike the Gallagher Premiership, an administration event does not automatically lead to the punishment or expulsion of a club, and the Welsh union announced that they would seek new private owners for Cardiff forthwith. In 2017, the Welsh union had taken over the Dragons RFC team, but avoided administration, returning the club fully to private ownership six years later. The South African side Southern Kings had been the last team to fall into administration, entering voluntary administration in September 2020; the team left the league and was wound up shortly afterwards by choice of the South African Rugby Union.

== Regional Shield competitions ==
Regional shield standings were based entirely on performances against other teams within the same conference. Therefore, only six games for each team counted towards the regional shields. Leinster Rugby became the first team to win their regional shield for the season, in their case the Irish Shield, their fourth from four since the format was introduced. On 9 March 2024, the Sharks confirmed their first South African Shield. On 19 April 2025, at the Judgement Day fixture, Cardiff Rugby sealed the Welsh Shield title with a 34–18 victory against Ospreys while Glasgow Warriors sealed their third Scottish-Italian Shield with a 14–6 victory over Zebre Parma.

Final standings:

2024–25 United Rugby Championship Regional Shield Pools
(Ireland) Irish Shield
	Team	P	W	D	L	PF	PA	PD	TF	TA	TBP	LBP	Pts	Pos overall
1	(Ireland) Leinster (S)	6	6	0	0	175	80	+95	26	11	5	0	29	1
2	(Ireland) Munster	6	4	0	2	144	150	–6	22	22	4	0	20	6
3	(Ireland) Ulster	6	2	0	4	125	162	–37	16	26	1	2	11	14
4	(Ireland) Connacht	6	0	0	6	115	167	–52	18	23	3	3	6	13
(Italy) (Scotland) Italian x Scottish Shield
	Team	P	W	D	L	PF	PA	PD	TF	TA	TBP	LBP	Pts	Pos overall
1	(Scotland) Glasgow Warriors (S)	6	4	0	2	136	76	+60	20	9	3	1	20	4
2	(Italy) Benetton	6	4	0	2	132	139	–7	19	19	3	0	19	10
3	(Scotland) Edinburgh	6	2	1	3	134	141	–7	18	20	1	2	13	7
4	(Italy) Zebre Parma	6	1	1	4	88	124	–46	9	18	0	1	7	15
(South Africa) South African Shield
	Team	P	W	D	L	PF	PA	PD	TF	TA	TBP	LBP	Pts	Pos overall
1	(South Africa) Sharks (S)	6	4	0	2	129	135	−6	17	20	2	1	19	3
2	(South Africa) Stormers	6	3	0	3	142	130	+12	19	15	3	3	18	5
3	(South Africa) Bulls	6	3	0	3	151	141	+10	19	17	3	2	17	2
4	(South Africa) Lions	6	2	0	4	141	157	−16	19	22	1	1	10	11
(Wales) Welsh Shield
	Team	P	W	D	L	PF	PA	PD	TF	TA	TBP	LBP	Pts	Pos overall
1	(Wales) Cardiff (S)	6	4	1	1	147	117	+30	23	14	4	1	23	9
2	(Wales) Scarlets	6	4	0	2	163	126	+37	20	18	3	1	20	7
3	(Wales) Ospreys	6	2	1	3	155	156	–1	21	20	1	1	12	12
4	(Wales) Dragons	6	1	0	5	130	196	–66	15	27	0	1	5	16
If teams are level at any stage, tiebreakers are applied in the following order: 1. number of matches won 2. the difference between points for and points against 3. the number of tries scored 4. the most points scored 5. the difference between tries for and tries against 6. the fewest red cards received 7. the fewest yellow cards received
Green background indicates teams currently leading the regional shield. Upon the conclusion of the regular season, these teams win their respective regional shields. (S) : URC Shield champion

== URC league standings ==
Pos	Team	Pld	W	D	L	PF	PA	PD	TF	TA	TB	LB	Pts	Qualification
1	Leinster (CH)	18	16	0	2	542	256	+286	79	35	11	1	76	Qualifies for home URC quarter-final; Qualification for the 2025–26 Champions Cup
2	Bulls (RU)	18	14	0	4	542	361	+181	71	44	9	3	68	Qualifies for home URC quarter-final; Qualification for the 2025–26 Champions Cup
3	Sharks	18	13	0	5	436	402	+34	55	59	7	3	62	Qualifies for home URC quarter-final; Qualification for the 2025–26 Champions Cup
4	Glasgow Warriors	18	11	0	7	468	327	+141	70	40	10	5	59	Qualifies for home URC quarter-final; Qualification for the 2025–26 Champions Cup
5	Stormers	18	10	0	8	507	418	+89	66	57	11	4	55	Qualifies for URC quarter-final; Qualification for the 2025–26 Champions Cup
6	Munster	18	9	0	9	444	429	+15	67	59	11	4	51	Qualifies for URC quarter-final; Qualification for the 2025–26 Champions Cup
7	Edinburgh	18	8	1	9	471	407	+64	66	57	9	6	49	Qualifies for URC quarter-final; Qualification for the 2025–26 Champions Cup
8	Scarlets	18	9	1	8	427	382	+45	50	52	6	4	48	Qualifies for URC quarter-final; Qualification for the 2025–26 Champions Cup
9	Cardiff	18	8	1	9	409	477	−68	63	65	10	3	47	Qualification for the 2025–26 Challenge Cup
10	Benetton	18	9	1	8	393	478	−85	50	65	7	1	46	Qualification for the 2025–26 Challenge Cup
11	Lions	18	8	0	10	402	440	−38	53	60	5	3	40	Qualification for the 2025–26 Challenge Cup
12	Ospreys	18	7	1	10	437	454	−17	60	63	6	4	40	Qualification for the 2025–26 Challenge Cup
13	Connacht	18	6	0	12	420	472	−52	64	62	9	6	39	Qualification for the 2025–26 Challenge Cup
14	Ulster	18	7	0	11	414	506	−92	59	72	5	5	38	Qualification for the 2025–26 Challenge Cup
15	Zebre Parma	18	5	1	12	302	503	−201	38	72	3	4	29	Qualification for the 2025–26 Challenge Cup
16	Dragons	18	1	0	17	335	637	−302	43	92	1	4	9	Qualification for the 2025–26 Challenge Cup

Source: UnitedRugby.com
Rules for classification: Tiebreakers for teams tied on points: 1) Number of matches won 2) The difference between points for and points against 3) The number of tries scored 4) The most points scored 5) The difference between tries for and tries against 6) The fewest red cards received 7) The fewest yellow cards received.

== European qualification ==
Priority order for 2025–26 European Rugby Champions Cup qualification was as follows:

- 2024–25 United Rugby Championship champions
- the 2024–25 European Rugby Champions Cup champions (if a URC team but not already qualified as above)
- the 2024–25 EPCR Challenge Cup champions (if a URC team but not already qualified as above)
- the next highest-ranked teams during regular season play not already qualified as above, until eight overall qualifiers had been selected.

As a result of the priority order, the top five teams in the regular season standings were guaranteed qualification to the Champions Cup. The remaining three places would have depended on the winners of the three main competitions involving URC teams, followed if necessary by the teams finishing sixth to eighth in the regular URC standings, but as no URC teams reached the final of either European competition, the qualifiers were simply the top 8 teams in the URC.

The eight remaining teams automatically qualify for the 2025–26 EPRC Challenge Cup.

Leinster became the first side to guarantee qualification to the Champions Cup when they guaranteed themselves a top five finish in Round 14; at that point, their lead over sixth placed Ulster, 25 points with 20 to play for, became unassailable. In Round 15, Glasgow also assured themselves of Champions Cup rugby in 2025–26. As Leinster were the only remaining URC team that could win the Champions Cup, and they were already assured qualification, the sixth-place finisher became assured of top-tier European rugby after the European Champions Cup quarter final. In Round 16, Bulls and Sharks, from South Africa, guaranteed themselves a top six finish, and Champions Cup rugby in 2025–26. With the elimination of the final URC team, Edinburgh, from the Challenge Cup, it was confirmed that all eight quarterfinalists for the United Rugby Championship will also qualify for the European Rugby Champions Cup in 2025–26. On 16 May, with five matches left in the final round of games, defeats for Cardiff and Benetton Rugby confirmed the final four European Rugby Champions Cup qualifiers for 2025–26 as Stormers, Munster, Edinburgh and Scarlets.

The EPCR Challenge Cup qualifiers for 2025–26 are therefore Cardiff, Ospreys, Dragons, Connacht, Ulster, Lions, Benetton and Zebre Parma.

== Matches ==
The following are the match results for the 2024–25 United Rugby Championship regular season:

Home \ Away	BEN	BUL	CAR	CON	DRA	EDI	GLA	LEI	LIO	MUN	OSP	SCA	SHA	STO	ULS	ZEB
Benetton		15-17	20-19			21-18	33-7	5-35				20-20	38-10		34-19	11-10
Bulls			45–21		55-15	22-16		21-20	31-19				19-29	16–19	47-21	63-24
Cardiff					31-23		36-52		20–17	26–21	13–13	19–25	22–42		21-19	22-17
Connacht	38–30	14-28	24-19		31-7	21-31		12-33		24-30			36-30		7-17	
Dragons	21-31		22-24				20-45		19-23	19-38	23-21	23-31	30-33		30-34	
Edinburgh	50-33		27-8		38-5		10-7	31-33					17-18	38-7	47–17	17-22
Glasgow Warriors	42-10	19-26		22-19		33-14			42-0	28–25	31–32	17-15				33-3
Leinster			42–24	20-12	34-6		13-5		24-6	26-12				36-12	41-17	72-5
Lions	31-42	22-35		26-7		55-21					29-28	19-32	38–14	30–23	35-22	
Munster	30–21	13-16		35-33		28–34		7-28	17-10		23-0	29-8			38–20	
Ospreys	43-0	19-29	19-36	43-40	57-24	22-13		19-22				23-22		37-24		
Scarlets		23-22	15-24	23-24	32-15	30-24		35-22			38-22			17-29		30-8
Sharks		20-17					28-24	7-10	25–22	41-24	29–10	12-3		21-15		35-34
Stormers	54-5	32–33	34–24	34-29	48-12		17-28		29-10	34-19			24-20			
Ulster				32-27			20-19	20-27		19-22	36-12	30–28	19-22	38-34		14-15
Zebre Parma	12-24			12-22	31–21	25-25	6-14		9-10	42-33	22-17			5-36		

Colours: Green: home team win; Yellow: draw; Red: away team win; Blue: upcoming matches

== Regular season ==
=== Round 1 ===
20 September 2024	(1 BP) Cardiff (Wales)	22–17	(Italy) Zebre Parma (1 BP)	Cardiff Arms Park, Cardiff
19:35	Try: Winnett 9' c Stephens 18' m D. Thomas 23' m McNally 56' m Con: Sheedy (1/4) 10'		Try: Bertaccini 64' c Locatelli 81' c Con: Da Re (2/2) 65', 82'; Pen: Montemauri 8'	Attendance: 6,291; Referee: Eoghan Cross (Ireland)

20 September 2024	(2 BP) Edinburgh (Scotland)	31–33	(Ireland) Leinster (1 BP)	Hive Stadium, Edinburgh
19:35	Try: Schoeman 11' c van der Merwe (2) 32' m, 66' m Cherry 42' c M. Scott 80' c Con: Thompson (2/3) 11', 43'; Healy (1/2) 80+1'		Try: T. O'Brien 15' m Tector 26' c Larmour 46' c Gibson-Park 53' c Conan 56' c Con: Prendergast (4/5) 27', 47', 54', 58'	Attendance: 7,774; Referee: Andrea Piardi (Italy)

21 September 2024	Dragons (Wales)	23–21	(Wales) Ospreys (1 BP)	Rodney Parade, Newport
15:00	Try: Keddie 26' c Yendle 83' c Con: L. Evans (2/2) 27', 84'; Pen: L. Evans (3) 1', 23', 77'		Try: K. Williams 19' c Conbeer 45' m Con: Edwards (1/2) 20'; Pen: Edwards (3) 7', 33', 37'	Attendance: 5,181; Referee: Ben Breakspear (Wales)

21 September 2024	(1 BP) Munster (Ireland)	35–33	(Ireland) Connacht (2 BP)	Thomond Park, Limerick
17:30	Try: Nankivell 28' c Haley 31' c Hodnett 44' c Coombes 58' c Daly 69' c Con: Burns (3/3) 28', 32', 45'; Butler (2/2) 59', 70'		Try: Ioane 13' m B. Murphy (2) 20' c, 39' c Hawkshaw 53' c Forde 63' c Con: Ioane (3/4) 21', 54', 64'; Forde (1/1) 40'	Attendance: 15,705; Referee: Chris Busby (Ireland)

21 September 2024	Benetton (Italy)	20–20	(Wales) Scarlets	Stadio Monigo, Treviso
20:35	Try: Ratave (2) 21' m, 78' m Smith 31' c Con: Umaga (1/3) 32'; Pen: Umaga 48'		Try: Page 40' c Taylor 52' c Con: Lloyd (2/2) 41', 53'; Pen: Lloyd (2) 59', 67'	Attendance: 3,243; Referee: Ian Kenny (Scotland)

21 September 2024	Ulster (Ireland)	20–19	(Scotland) Glasgow Warriors (1 BP)	Ravenhill Stadium, Belfast
19:45	Try: Morgan 18' c McCann 72' m Shanahan 84' m Con: Doak (1/1) 19'; Pen: Doak 16'	Report	Try: Matthews 5' m Venter 25' c Steyn 74' c Con: Jordan (1/2) 26'; Hastings (1/1) 75'	Attendance: 11,533; Referee: Adam Jones (Wales)

8 February 2025	(2 BP) Stormers (South Africa)	32–33	(South Africa) Bulls (1 BP)	Cape Town Stadium, Cape Town
13:00				Attendance: 47,171

8 Match 2025 (rearranged)	(1 BP) Sharks (South Africa)	25–22	(South Africa) Lions	Hollywoodbets Kings Park
	Try: Williams; Kolisi (2); Hatton; Con: Hendrikse; Pen: Hendrikse	Report	Try: Mafura; Kriel; Marais; Con: Lombard (2); Pen: Lombard	Attendance: 19,417

=== Round 2 ===
27 September 2024	(1 BP) Glasgow Warriors (Scotland)	42–10	(Italy) Benetton	Scotstoun Stadium, Glasgow
19:35	Try: Steyn 5' c, 63' c M. Fagerson 16' c Darge 46' c Dobie 50'; Ferrie 80'+1 c Con: Hastings (2/2) 6', 17'; Weir (4/4) 47', 51', 64' 80'+3		Try: Spagnolo 32'; Con: Umaga (1/1) 34'; Pen: Umaga (1) 43'	Attendance: 6,441; Referee: Marius van der Westhuizen (South Africa)

27 September 2024	(1 BP) Leinster (Ireland)	34–6	(Wales) Dragons	Aviva Stadium, Dublin
19:35	Try: Conan 17' m R. Byrne 37' m Deegan 46' c McCarthy 64' m Larmour 68' c King 81' m Con: R. Byrne (2/6) 46', 65'		Pen: L. Evans (2/3) 25', 40'	Attendance: 18,397; Referee: Mike Adamson (Scotland)

28 September 2024	(1 BP) Lions (South Africa)	35–22	(Ireland) Ulster (1 BP)	Ellis Park Stadium, Johannesburg
12:55	Try: Maxwane 10' m F. Horn 34' c Marais 46' m van Wyk 49' c Wolhuter 79' m Con: Wolhuter (2/4) 35', 51'; Pen: Wolhuter (2/2) 14', 57'		Try: Cooney 40+3' m Morgan 42' m Kok 59' m Barrett 77' c Con: Doak (1/2) 78'	Attendance: 2,194; Referee: Sam Grove-White (Scotland)

28 September 2024	Bulls (South Africa)	22–16	(Scotland) Edinburgh (1 BP)	Loftus Versfeld Stadium, Pretoria
15:00	Try: Kirsten 29' c van der Walt 32' m Moodie 63' c Con: van der Walt (1/2) 29'; Chamberlain (1/1) 65'; Pen: Chamberlain (1/1) 68'		Try: Ashman 38' c Con: Thompson (1/1) 40'; Pen: Thompson (3/3) 14', 47', 74'	Attendance: 5,500; Referee: Ben Breakspear (Wales)

28 September 2024	(1 BP) Zebre Parma (Italy)	42–33	(Ireland) Munster (1 BP)	Stadio Sergio Lanfranchi, Parma
16:00	Try: Trulla (2) 22' m, 41' m Fusco (2) 26' c, 59' c Licata 51' c Prisciantelli 62' m Con: Montemauri (3/6) 27', 52' 60'; Pen: Montemauri 11'; Da Re 80'		Try: Coombes (2) 19' c, 30' c Haley 33' c Fitzgerald 40' c McCarthy 76' m Con: Butler (4/5) 20', 31', 34', 41'	Attendance: 2,300; Referee: Hollie Davidson (Scotland)

28 September 2024	Scarlets (Wales)	15–24	(Wales) Cardiff (1 BP)	Parc y Scarlets, Llanelli
17:15	Try: Page 1' c Plumtree 10' m Con: Costelow (1/2) 1'; Pen: Costelow (1) 4'		Try: Belcher 17' m Grady 21' c Millard 56'; B. Thomas 62'; Con: Sheedy (2/4) 21', 63'	Attendance: 7,355; Referee: Christopher Allison (South Africa)

28 September 2024	(1 BP) Connacht (Ireland)	36–30	(South Africa) Sharks (1 BP)	The Sportsground, Galway
19:35	Try: Heffernan (2) 3' c, 50' m Forde 42' c Jennings 54' c Dowling 70' c Con: Ioane (1/1) 4'; Forde (3/4) 43', 55', 71'; Pen: Forde (1) 79'		Try: Esterhuizen (2) 21' c, 28' c Grobler 37' c Con: Masuku (3/3) 22', 30', 39'; Pen: Jo. Hendrikse (2) 24', 34'; Masuku 80'+1	Attendance: 4,217; Referee: Federico Vedovelli (Italy)

28 September 2024	(1 BP) Ospreys (Wales)	37–24	(South Africa) Stormers	Brewery Field. Bridgend
19:35	Try: J. Morgan 25' c Morgan-Williams48' c Edwards 64' c Penalty try 80'; Con: Edwards (3/3) 26', 49', 65'; Pen: Edwards (2) 8', 36'; Drop: Edwards 52'		Try: Zas 5' c Schickerling 70' m Con: Matthee (1/2) 6'; Pen: Matthee (3/3) 11', 22', 41'; Drop: Willemse 44'	Attendance: 3,781; Referee: Andrew Brace (Ireland)

=== Round 3 ===
4 October 2024	(1 BP) Scarlets (Wales)	23–24	(Ireland) Connacht	Parc y Scarlets, Llanelli
19:35	Try: G. Davies (2) 21' c, 29' c Con: Costelow (2/2) 22', 30'; Pen: Costelow (2) 42', 73'; Lloyd 52'		Try: O'Conor 9' c Hansen 15' c J. Murphy 37' c Con: Carty (3/3) 10', 16', 38'; Pen: Forde 77'	Attendance: 5,080; Referee: Marius van der Westhuizen (South Africa)

4 October 2024	(1 BP) Cardiff (Wales)	36–52	(Scotland) Glasgow Warriors (1 BP)	Cardiff Arms Park, Cardiff
19:35	Try: D. Thomas 11' c Winnett 19' m Byrne 46' c Martin 52' c Donnell 67' c Con: Sheedy (1/2) 12' de Beer (3/3) 47', 54' 69'; Pen: de Beer (1/1) 59'		Try: Dobie 5' c Rowe (2) 21' m, 74' m Jordan (2) 29' c, 74' m Tuipulotu 34' c Jones 37' c M. Fagerson 74' m Con: Jordan (5/6) 6', 30', 35', 39', 64'; Weir (1/2) 72'	Attendance: 6,237; Referee: Morné Ferreira (South Africa)

5 October 2024	(1 BP) Lions (South Africa)	55–21	(Scotland) Edinburgh	Ellis Park Stadium, Johannesburg
13:45	Try: Q. Horn 5' m Maxwane (3) 12' c, 31' c, 71' c van der Merwe (2) 20' c, 39' c Jonker 26' c F. Horn 35' m Con: Wolhuter (4/5) 13', 21', 27', 31'; Nohamba (2/3) 40', 73'; Pen: Wolhuter (1/1) 2'		Try: Gilchrist 44' c Harrison 50' c Muncaster 66' c Con: Healy (2/2) 44', 51'; Ross Thompson (1/1) 67'	Attendance: 3,542; Referee: Adam Jones (Wales)

5 October 2024	(1 BP) Bulls (South Africa)	47–21	(Ireland) Ulster	Loftus Versfeld Stadium, Pretoria
16:00	Try: Arendse 5' c Kriel 13' c Grobbelaar 33' c Moodie 41' c Hanekom 55' m Chamberlain 60' c E. Louw 77' c Con: Chamberlain (3) 6', 14', 34'; Kriel (2) 42', 61'; Johannes 78'		Try: Stockdale 8' c Carson 68' c Moore 71' c Con: Doak (1/1) 9'; Humphreys (2/2) 69', 72'	Attendance: 6,319; Referee: Ben Whitehouse (Wales)

5 October 2024	Benetton (Italy)	5–35	(Ireland) Leinster (1 BP)	Stadio Monigo, Treviso
18:15	Try: Manfredi 65' m		Try: Penalty try 9'; Frawley 11' c Conan 18' c Doris 25' c Barron 79' c Con: Frawley (3/3) 11', 19', 26'; R. Byrne (1/1) 80'	Attendance: 4,391; Referee: Craig Evans (Wales)

5 October 2024	(1 BP) Dragons (Wales)	30–33	(South Africa) Sharks (1 BP)	Rodney Parade, Newport
17:15	Try: Basham 17' c Coleman 26' m R. Williams 37' c Carter 54' m Con: L. Evans (2/3) 17', 38'; Pen: L. Evans 3'; Reed 58'		Try: V. Tshituka 21' m Ja. Hendrikse 39' c Julius 44' c Hooker 48' c Mbatha 80'+4; Con: Masuku (4/5) 40', 45', 49', 80'+7	Attendance: 4,591; Referee: Andrew Brace (Ireland)

5 October 2024	(1 BP) Munster (Ireland)	23–0	(Wales) Ospreys	Musgrave Park, Cork
19:35	Try: McCarthy 1' m Farrell 26' m Nash 39' m O'Donoghue 63' m Pen: Crowley 9'			Attendance: 8,293; Referee: Mike Adamson (Scotland)

5 October 2024	Zebre Parma (Italy)	5–36	(South Africa) Stormers (1 BP)	Stadio Sergio Lanfranchi, Parma
20:35	Try: Gesi 75' m		Try: Zas 40' c, 72' m Hartzenberg 59' m Davids 78'; Con: Matthee 41'; Willemse 79'; Pen: Matthee (4) 2', 23', 27', 43'	Attendance: 1,867; Referee: Chris Busby (Ireland)

=== Round 4 ===
11 October 2024	(1 BP) Glasgow Warriors (Scotland)	33–3	(Italy) Zebre Parma	Scotstoun Stadium, Glasgow
19:35	Try: Matthews 13' c Dobie 17' c Jones (2) 33' c, 52' c Stewart 60' m Con: Hastings (4/5) 14', 18', 34', 52'		Pen: Da Re (1/1) 27'	Attendance: 6,499; Referee: Griffin Colby (South Africa)

12 October 2024	(1 BP) Benetton (Italy)	38–10	(South Africa) Sharks	Stadio Monigo, Treviso
16:00	Try: Odogwu 23' c Smith (2) 29' c, 68' c Mendy 37' c Marin 75' c Con: Umaga (5/5) 24', 31', 38', 69', 76'; Pen: Umaga (1) 10'		Try: Mchunu 80' c Con: Cronjé (1/1) 80'; Pen: Masuku 17'	Attendance: 3,900; Referee: Sam Grove-White (Scotland)

12 October 2024	(1 BP) Cardiff (Wales)	19–25	(Wales) Scarlets	Cardiff Arms Park, Cardiff
15:00	Try: Millard 22' c, 43' m Penalty try 66'; Con: De Beer (1/1) 23'		Try: G. Davies (2) 32' m, 46' c J. Williams 59' c Con: Lloyd (2/3) 47', 60'; Pen: Lloyd (2) 8', 16'	Attendance: 12,125; Referee: Craig Evans (Wales)

12 October 2024	(1 BP) Edinburgh (Scotland)	38–7	(South Africa) Stormers	Hive Stadium, Edinburgh
17:15	Try: Harrison 18' c Muncaster (2) 21' c, 79' c Graham 58' c Gilchrist 62' c Con: Thompson (4/4) 19', 22', 58', 63'; C. Scott (1/1) 80'; Pen: Thompson (1) 74'		Try: Nel 31' c Con: Willemse (1/1) 32'	Attendance: 6,914; Referee: Ben Whitehouse (Wales)

12 October 2024	(1 BP) Leinster (Ireland)	26–12	(Ireland) Munster	Croke Park, Dublin
17:45	Try: Lowe 5' c' Doris 10' c Keenan 14' c Snyman 40' m Con: Frawley (3/4) 6', 11', 15'		Try: O'Brien 34' m Haley 65' c Con: Crowley (1/2) 66'	Attendance: 80,468; Referee: Chris Busby (Ireland)

12 October 2024	Ospreys (Wales)	19–29	(South Africa) Bulls (1 BP)	Swansea.com Stadium, Swansea
19:35	Try: Lake 26' m Conbeer 54' c Morris 79' c Con: Edwards (1/2) 55'; Walsh (1/1) 79'		Try: E. Louw 2' c' Arendse (2) 10' m, 22' c Papier 12' c Con: Chamberlain (3/4) 3', 13', 23'; Pen: Chamberlain 76'	Attendance: 3,901; Referee: Eoghan Cross (Ireland)

12 October 2024	(1 BP) Ulster (Ireland)	32–27	(Ireland) Connacht (2 BP)	Ravenhill Stadium, Belfast
20:00	Try: Andrew 2' c Postlethwaite 20' m Cooney 27' c McCann 49' m Timoney 75' m Con: Cooney (2/5) 3', 28'; Pen: Cooney 71'		Try: Bolton 10' m Joyce 30' m B. Murphy 40' c Tierney-Martin 60' c Con: Ioane (2/4) 42', 62'; Pen: Ioane 79'	Attendance: 12,442; Referee: Andrew Brace (Ireland)

13 October 2024	(1 BP) Dragons (Wales)	19–23	(South Africa) Lions	Rodney Parade, Newport
14:30	Try: Keddie 14' c Basham (2) 24' m, 42' c Con: Evans (2/3) 15', 43'		Try: Q. Horn 10' c Cairns 51' c Con: Steyn (1/1) 11'; Nohamba (1/1) 52'; Pen: Steyn (2/2) 28', 40+1'; Nohamba (1/1) 49'	Attendance: 4 237; Referee: Fillipo Russo (Italy)

=== Round 5 ===
18 October 2024	Scarlets (Wales)	23–22	(South Africa) Bulls (1 BP)	Parc y Scarlets, Llanelli
19:35	Try: Macleod 11' c Murray 41' m Rogers 71' m Con: Lloyd 12'; Pen: Lloyd (2) 40', 52'		Try: Moodie 1' c Burger 15' m Arendse 29' c Con: Chamberlain 2', 30'; Pen: Chamberlain 49'	Attendance: 5,274; Referee: Federico Vedovelli (Italy)

18 October 2024	(1 BP) Ulster (Ireland)	36–12	(Wales) Ospreys	Ravenhill Stadium, Belfast
19:35	Try: McCormick (2) 4' m, 50' m Stockdale (2) 9' m, 64' c Penalty try Mar. Rea 31' c Con: Cooney 33'; Doak 65'		Try: Parry 39' c Giles 61' m Con: Edwards 40'	Attendance: 12,272; Referee: Andrea Piardi (Italy)

19 October 2024	(1 BP) Zebre Parma (Italy)	9–10	(South Africa) Lions	Stadio Sergio Lanfranchi, Parma
13:30	Try: Montemauri (3/4) 14', 21', 46'		Try: van der Merwe 27' c Con: Nohamba (1/1) 28'; Pen: Nohamba (1/2) 42'	Attendance: 1,187; Referee: Ben Connor (Wales)

19 October 2024	Sharks (South Africa)	28–24	(Scotland) Glasgow Warriors (2 BP)	Kings Park Stadium, Durban
15:45	Try: Kolisi 26' c Fassi 33' m Williams 70'; Con: Jo. Hendrikse (2/3) 27', 71'; Pen: Jo. Hendrikse (3/4) 11', 45', 66'		Try: Horne (2) 17' c, 36'; Darge 79' m Matthews 80'+1 c Con: Horne (1/2) 18'; Hastings (1/2) 80'+2	Attendance: 10,799; Referee: Chris Busby (Ireland)

19 October 2024	Stormers (South Africa)	34–19	(Ireland) Munster	Cape Town Stadium, Cape Town
18:00	Try: Hartzenberg 5' c Theunissen 33' c R. Nel (2) 46' c, 80'+2; Con: Willemse (4/4) 6', 34', 47', 80'+3; Pen: Willemse 75'; Drop: Willemse 76'		Try: Farrell 17 c' Clarke 26' m Coombes 67' c Con: Crowley (2/3) 19', 68'	Attendance: 28,013; Referee: Mike Adamson (Scotland)

19 October 2024	(1 BP) Edinburgh (Scotland)	27–8	(Wales) Cardiff	Hive Stadium, Edinburgh
17:15	Try: van der Merwe 45' c Schoeman 61' m Graham 64' m Ashman 78' c Con: Thompson (2/4) 46', 79'; Pen: Thompson 6'		Try: Young 28' m Pen: Sheedy 57'	Attendance: 6,507; Referee: Morné Ferreira (South Africa)

19 October 2024	Connacht (Ireland)	12–33	(Ireland) Leinster (1 BP)	The Sportsground, Galway
19:35	Try: O'Brien 33' m Forde 64' c Con: Ioane (1/2) 64'		Try: J. Osborne 5' c Turner 15' c Snyman 38' c Deegan 45' m A. Osborne 65' c Con: Frawley (1/1) 6'; R. Byrne (3/4) 16', 40', 66'	Attendance: 6,117; Referee: Eoghan Cross (Ireland)

19 October 2024	Dragons (Wales)	21–31	(Italy) Benetton (1 BP)	Rodney Parade, Newport
19:35	Try: Westwood 26' c L. Evans 49' c Lewis-Hughes 72' c Con: L. Evans (2/2) 28', 50'. O'Brien 73'		Try: Bernasconi 36' c Avaca 45' c Manfredi 60' c Cannone 67' c Con: Umaga (2/2) 37', 47'; Albornoz (2/2) 61', 68'; Pen: Umaga 32'	Attendance: 4,132; Referee: Peter Martin (Ireland)

=== Round 6 ===
25 October 2024	(1 BP) Scarlets (Wales)	30–8	(Italy) Zebre Parma	Parc y Scarlets, Llanelli
19:35	Try: Rogers 27' m Page 42' m Murray 46' c Macleod 56' c Con: Lloyd (2/4) 44', 58'; Pen: Lloyd (2) 4', 23'		Try: Cambriani 8' m Drop: Prisciantelli 5'	Attendance: 5,892; Referee: Morné Ferreira (South Africa)

25 October 2024	(1 BP) Benetton (Italy)	15–17	(South Africa) Bulls	Stadio Monigo, Treviso
19:35	Pen: Albornoz (4) 1', 34', 62', 72'; Smith 3'		Try: Ludwig 67' c van der Merwe 77' c Con: Kriel (2/2) 68', 79'; Pen: Johannes 22'	Attendance: 4,312; Referee: Eoghan Cross (Ireland)

26 October 2024	Stormers (South Africa)	17–28	(Scotland) Glasgow Warriors (1 BP)	Danie Craven Stadium, Stellenbosch
13:45	Try: Willemse 33' c du Plessis 54' c Con: Libbok (2/2) 34', 55'; Pen: Libbok 63'		Try: Matthews 37' c Tuipulotu 47' c Rowe 63' c Venter 70' c Con: Hastings (2/2) 38', 48'; Jordan (2/2) 65', 72'	Attendance: 12,976; Referee: Andrew Brace (Ireland)

26 October 2024	Ospreys (Wales)	22–13	(Scotland) Edinburgh	Brewery Field, Bridgend
15:00	Try: Lake 3' c Thomas 52' m Parry 74' c Con: O. Williams (2/3) 5', 75'; Pen: O. Williams 59'		Try: Vellacott 22' c Con: Thompson (1/1) 22'; Pen: Thompson (2) 16', 65'	Attendance: 3,294; Referee: Griffin Colby (South Africa)

26 October 2024	(1 BP) Sharks (South Africa)	41–24	(Ireland) Munster (1 BP)	Kings Park Stadium, Durban
16:00	Try: Fassi 0' c Mapimpi 4' c Williams 23' c Esterhuizen 36' c Tshituka 65' c Con: Jo. Hendrikse (5/5) 1', 5', 24', 37', 66'; Pen: Jo. Hendrikse (2) 13', 48'		Try: Ahern 18' m Haley 30' m Nash 73' c Beirne 80'; Con: Burns (2/2) 73', 80'+1	Attendance: 19,465; Referee: Hollie Davidson (Scotland)

26 October 2024	Leinster (Ireland)	24–6	(South Africa) Lions	Aviva Stadium, Dublin
17:15	Try: van der Flier 31' c Doris 57' c Penalty try 80'+1; Con: Prendergast (2/2) 32', 58'; Pen: Prendergast 2'		Pen: Wolhuter (2) 12', 17'	Attendance: 20,945; Referee: Craig Evans (Wales)

26 October 2024	(1 BP) Connacht (Ireland)	31–7	(Wales) Dragons	The Sportsground, Galway
19:35	Try: Boyle 5' c Blade 19' c Prendergast 38' m Forde 73' c Devine 80' m Con: Forde (3/5) 7', 20', 74'		Try: Basham 77' c Con: O'Brien 78'	Attendance: 3,128; Referee: Gianluca Gnecchi (Italy)

26 October 2024	Cardiff (Wales)	21–19	(Ireland) Ulster (1 BP)	Cardiff Arms Park, Cardiff
19:35	Try: Stephens 48' c Hughes 64' c Young 67' c Con: Sheedy (3/3) 49', 65', 68'		Try: Izuchukwu 13' c Postlethwaite (2) 17' c, 23' m Con: Doak (2/3) 14', 18'	Attendance: 8,312; Referee: Sam Grove-White (Scotland)

=== Round 7 ===
29 November 2024	Glasgow Warriors (Scotland)	17–15	(Wales) Scarlets (1 BP)	Scotstoun Stadium, Glasgow
19:35	Try: Matthews 35' c Venter 49' c Con: Weir (2/2) 36', 51'; Pen: Weir 65'		Try: Macleod 10' m Nicholas 46' c Con: Lloyd (1/2) 47'; Pen: Lloyd 7'	Attendance: 6,403; Referee: Fillipo Russo (Italy)

29 November 2024	(1 BP) Ulster (Ireland)	20–27	(Ireland) Leinster (1 BP)	Ravenhill Stadium, Belfast
19:35	Try: Carson (2) 4' c, 55' c Con: Doak (2/2) 6', 56'; Pen: Doak (2) 12', 29'		Try: McGrath 9' c Larmour 49' c J. O'Brien 59' m Culhane 72' m Con: R. Byrne (2/4) 10', 49'; Pen: R. Byrne 16'	Attendance: 16,491; Referee: Eoghan Cross (Ireland)

30 November 2024	Sharks (South Africa)	21–15	(South Africa) Stormers (1 BP)	Kings Park Stadium, Durban
16:00	Try: Hooker 11' c Kolisi 16' c Esterhuizen 58' c Con: Masuku (2/2) 12', 17'; Jo. Hendrikse (1/1) 60'		Try: Zas 44' m penalty try 79'; Drop: Feinberg-Mngomezulu 24'	Attendance: 33,744; Referee: Marius van der Westhuizen (South Africa)

30 November 2024	(1 BP) Cardiff (Wales)	31–23	(Wales) Dragons	Cardiff Arms Park, Cardiff
17:15	Try: Mann 31' c Millard 42' c Sheedy 42' c Lee-Lo 49' c Con: Sheedy (4/4) 32', 43', 43', 50'; Pen: Sheedy 7'		Try: Lloyd 64' c Seiuli 71' c Con: O'Brien (2/2) 65', 72'; Pen: O'Brien (3) 11', 23', 28'	Attendance: 9,638; Referee: Ben Whitehouse (Wales)

30 November 2024	Connacht (Ireland)	14–28	(South Africa) Bulls (1 BP)	The Sportsground, Galway
17:30	Try: Hawkshaw 61' c Blade 74' c Con: Forde (2/2) 62', 75'		Try: de Klerk 5' c Papier 35' c Kriel 41' c Moodie 54' c Con: Goosen (4/4) 6', 37', 42', 55'	Attendance: 3,109; Referee: Mike Adamson (Scotland)

30 November 2024	Munster (Ireland)	17–10	(South Africa) Lions (1 BP)	Thomond Park, Limerick
19:35	Try: Abrahams 15' c S. Daly 42' m Kendellen 53' m Con: Burns (1/3) 16'		Try: van Wyk 27' c Con: Wolhuter (1/1) 28'; Pen: Wolhuter 32'	Attendance: 11,836; Referee: Adam Jones (Wales)

30 November 2024	Zebre Parma (Italy)	22–17	(Wales) Ospreys (1 BP)	Stadio Sergio Lanfranchi, Parma
20:35	Try: Gesi (2) 6' c, 25' m Trulla 43' c Con: Da Re (2/3) 7', 44'; Pen: Da Re 57'		Try: Kasende 18' c Lloyd 72' m Con: O. Williams (1/2) 19', 73'; Pen: O. Williams 39'	Attendance: 2,395; Referee: Ian Kenny (Scotland)

30 November 2024	(1 BP) Edinburgh (Scotland)	50–33	(Italy) Benetton (1 BP)	Hive Stadium, Edinburgh
19:35	Try: van der Merwe 1' c Muncaster (2) 14' c, 74' c Bradbury (2) 19' c, 23' c Hill 42' c Price 56' m Con: Thompson (5/6) 2', 15', 20', 24', 42'; Healy 75'; Pen: Healy 80'		Try: Odogwu 42' m Creevy (2) 47' c, 53' c Izekor 62' c Fekitoa 69' c Con: Umaga (4/5) 48', 54', 63', 70'; Pen: Fekitoa 80'	Attendance: 6,057; Referee: Ben Breakspear (Wales)

=== Round 8 ===
20 December 2024	(1 BP) Ulster (Ireland)	19–22	(Ireland) Munster (1 BP)	Ravenhill Stadium, Belfast
19:35	Try: O'Toole 7 c' Sheridan 64' m McNabney 75' c Con: Cooney (2/3) 8' 76	Report	Try: Farrell 27', 51', 78' c S. Daly 66'; Con: Crowley (1/4) 80'	Attendance: 14,313; Referee: Ben Whitehouse (Wales)

21 December 2024	Benetton (Italy)	11–10	(Italy) Zebre Parma (1 BP)	Stadio Monigo, Treviso
14:00	Try: Marin 29' m Pen: Marin 58'; Smith 81'	Report	Try: Zambonin 71' c Con: Da Re 72'; Pen: Da Re 37'	Attendance: 5,000; Referee: Federico Vedovelli (Italy)

21 December 2024	(1 BP) Stormers (South Africa)	29–10	(South Africa) Lions	Cape Town Stadium, Cape Town
15:45	Try: Dweba 12' m Hartzenberg 24' m Dweba 33' m Zas 47' c Fouché 75' c Con: Libbok (2/5) 48', 76'	Report	Try: van der Merwe 43' m Marais 63' m	Attendance: 22,410

21 December 2024	Sharks (South Africa)	20–17	(South Africa) Bulls (1 BP)	Kings Park Stadium, Durban
17:00	Try: Ja. Hendrikse 18' c Penalty try Con: Jo. Hendrikse (1/1) 19'; Pen: Jo. Hendrikse (2) 6', 69'	Report	Try: Wiese 24' c Vorster 28' c Penalty try 52'; Con: Goosen (2/2) 24', 28'; Pen: Goosen (2) 47', 52'	Attendance: 34,827; Referee: Morné Ferreira (South Africa)

21 December 2024	Ospreys (Wales)	23–22	(Wales) Scarlets (1 BP)	Swansea.com Stadium, Swansea
17:15	Try: Parry 36' m Tipuric 46' c Hopkins 80' m Con: Edwards (1/3) 47'; Pen: Edwards (2) 09', 58'	Report	Try: Mee 41' c Con: Lloyd (1/1) 42'; Pen: Lloyd (4) 15', 18', 26', 32'; Costelow 56'	Attendance: 6,836

21 December 2024	Leinster (Ireland)	20–12	(Ireland) Connacht	Aviva Stadium, Dublin
17:30	Try: A. Osbourne 19' c Tector 26' c Con: R. Byrne (2/2) 19', 27'; Pen: R. Byrne (2) 42', 79'	Report	Try: Dowling 52' m Jennings 60' c Con: Forde (1/2) 60'	Attendance: 33,963; Referee: Chris Busby (Scotland)

22 December 2024	(1 BP) Glasgow Warriors (Scotland)	33–14	(Scotland) Edinburgh	Hampden Park, Glasgow
15:00	Try: Matthews (2) 05' c, 26' c Jones 12' c Steyn 41' m Dobie 63' c Con: Horne (4/5) 07', 13', 27', 65'		Try: Venter (2) 74', 78'; Con: Healy (2/2) 74', 78'	Attendance: 27,538

26 December 2024	(1 BP) Dragons (Wales)	22–24	(Wales) Cardiff (1 BP)	Rodney Parade, Newport
15:00	Try: Wainwright 14' c Dyer 19' m R. Williams 68' c Con: O'Brien (2/3) 15', 69'; Pen: O'Brien 17'	Report	Try: Williams 32' m Adams 44' c Hamer-Webb 56' c Lloyd 75' m Con: Sheedy (2/4) 45', 57'	Attendance: 8,511; Referee: Adam Jones

=== Round 9 ===
27 December 2024	Munster (Ireland)	7–28	(Ireland) Leinster (1 BP)	Thomond Park, Limerick
19:35	Try: Ahern 44'; Con: Burns (1/1) 46'	Report	Try: McGrath 8'; Prendergast 32' van der Flier 53'; Doris 73'; Con: Prendergast (3/3) 9', 33', 53'; R. Byrne 74'	Attendance: 26,267

28 December 2024	(1 BP) Stormers (South Africa)	24–20	(South Africa) Sharks (1 BP)	Cape Town Stadium, Cape Town
17:00	Try: Senatla 09' m Fourie 53' m Libbok 66' c J. du Plessis 77' c Con: Libbok (2/4) 68', 79'	Report	Try: Penxe 32' c Jo. Hendrikse 70' c Con: Jo. Hendrikse (2/2) 33', 72'; Pen: Jo. Hendrikse (2) 05', 74'	Attendance: 46,002; Referee: Aimee Barrett-Theron

28 December 2024	Zebre Parma (Italy)	12–24	(Italy) Benetton (1 BP)	Stadio Sergio Lanfranchi, Parma
16:00	Try: Fischetti 19' c Gesi 47' m Con: Da Re (1/2) 21'	Report	Try: Maile (2) 24' m, 36' m Brex 65' c Marin 85' c Con: Smith (2/4) 66', 86'	Attendance: 5,000

28 December 2024	Edinburgh (Scotland)	10–7	(Scotland) Glasgow Warriors (1 BP)	Murrayfield Stadium, Edinburgh
15:00	Try: Schoeman 69' c Con: Healy (1/1) 71'; Pen: Thompson 22'	Report	Try: Penalty try 67'	Attendance: 40,063; Referee: Eoghan Cross (Ireland)

28 December 2024	Connacht (Ireland)	7–17	(Ireland) Ulster	The Sportsground, Galway
19:35	Try: Hansen 35' c Con: Carty (1/1) 36'	Report	Try: O'Sullivan 10' c Timoney 54' c Con: Doak (2/2) 11', 55'; Pen: Doak 14'	Attendance: 6,129; Referee: Andrew Brace

1 January 2025	Cardiff (Wales)	13–13	(Wales) Ospreys	Cardiff Arms Park, Cardiff
15:00	Try: Botham 6'; Hughes 53'; Pen: Thomas 70'	Report	Try: Edwards 49'; Con: Edwards 50'; Pen: Edwards (2) 31', 68'	Attendance: 12,125

1 January 2025	Scarlets (Wales)	32–15	(Wales) Dragons	Parc y Scarlets, Llanelli
17:15	Try: Murray (2) 7', 15'; Macleod 29'; Mee 42'; Con: Costelow (3/4) 8', 16', 31'; Pen: Costelow 11'; Lloyd 69'	Report	Try: Basham 49'; Anderson 66'; Con: O'Brien (1/2) 50'; Pen: O'Brien 14'	Attendance: 7,605

22 February 2025	Bulls (South Africa)	31–19	(South Africa) Lions	Loftus Versfeld Stadium, Pretoria
14:00				Attendance: 17,501

=== Round 10 ===
24 January 2025	Ospreys (Wales)	43–0	(Italy) Benetton	Swansea.com Stadium, Swansea
19:35	Try: Walsh (2) 9' c, 62' c Kasende 21' c K. Williams 27' c Morse 75' m Hardy 80' c Con: O. Williams (4/4) 9', 22', 28', 63'; Walsh (1/2) 81'; Pen: O. Williams 15'			Attendance: 2,832

25 January 2025	Lions (South Africa)	22–35	(South Africa) Bulls	Ellis Park Stadium, Johannesburg
14:45	Try: Van Wyk 33' m Oosthuizen 61' m Pen: Francis (4) 19', 28', 46', 52'		Try: Kriel 15' c Wiese 54' c Coetzee 65' c van der Merwe 69' m Con: Chamberlain 15'; Kriel (2/3) 54', 66'; Pen: Chamberlain (2) 9', 50'; Kriel 58'	Attendance: 19,881; Referee: Marius van der Westhuizen

25 January 2025	Scarlets (Wales)	30–24	(Scotland) Edinburgh	Parc y Scarlets, Llanelli
15:00	Try: van der Merwe 24' c Macleod 46' c Nicholas 59' c Con: Lloyd (3/3) 24', 47', 60'; Pen: Lloyd (3) 6', 13', 80'		Try: Skinner 30' c Harrison 39' m Healy 69' c Morris 76' m Con: Healy (2/4) 31', 70'	Attendance: 5,756

25 January 2025	Leinster (Ireland)	36–12	(South Africa) Stormers	Aviva Stadium, Dublin
17:00	Try: A. Osbourne (2) 10' c, 67' c Sheehan (2) 40' m, 61' c Barrett 57' c Con: R. Byrne (4/5) 11', 58', 62', 68'; Pen: R. Byrne 3'	Report	Try: Loader 20' c Roos 78' m Con: Libbok (1/1) 21'	Attendance: 18,892; Referee: Eoghan Cross (Ireland)

25 January 2025	Cardiff (Wales)	22–42	(South Africa) Sharks	Cardiff Arms Park, Cardiff
17:15	Try: Mann 6' m Bowen (2) 36' m, 43' c Hamer-Webb 57' m Con: Sheedy (1/4) 44'		Try: Mbonambi (2) 14' c, 41' c Julius 17' c Mapimpi 31' c F. Venter 72' c Penxe 75' c Con: Jo. Hendrikse (6/6) 14', 18', 32', 41', 73', 76'	Attendance: 11,687

25 January 2025	Dragons (Wales)	19–38	(Ireland) Munster	Rodney Parade, Newport
19:35	Try: Christian Coleman 41' m Harry Wilson 67' c Blacker 73' c Con: L. Evans (1/2) 67'; Reed 74'		Try: Kilgallen 2' m Kendellen 16' c O'Connor 18' c penalty try 19'; Bleuler 32' m Hodnett 53' c Con: Burns (2/4) 17', 19'; Butler 54'	Attendance: 4,562

26 January 2025	Glasgow Warriors (Scotland)	22–19	(Ireland) Connacht	Scotstoun Stadium, Glasgow
15:30	Try: Cancelliere 21' c Afshar 31' c Cancelliere 57' m Con: Weir (2/3) 22', 32'; Pen: Weir 8'		Try: Hawkshaw (2) 18' m, 41' c O'Conor 77' c Con: Hanrahan (2/3) 42', 78'	Attendance: 6,277

26 January 2025	Ulster (Ireland)	14–15	(Italy) Zebre Parma	Ravenhill Stadium, Belfast
17:30	Try: Barrett (2) 56' c, 75' c Con: Doak (2/2) 56', 76'		Try: Stavile 46' m Da Re 49' c Con: Montemauri (1/2) 50'; Pen: Montemauri 28'	Attendance: 11,792

=== Round 11 ===
14 February 2025	(1 BP) Edinburgh (Scotland)	17–22	(Italy) Zebre Parma	Hive Stadium, Edinburgh
19:35	Try: McCann 11' m Tuipulotu 55' c Crosbie 68' m Con: Thompson (1/3) 56'	Report	Try: Trulla 6' m García 24' c Di Bartolomeo 63' c Con: Da Re (2/3) 25', 64'; Pen: Da Re 47'	Attendance: 5,494

14 February 2025	(1 BP) Ospreys (Wales)	19–22	(Ireland) Leinster	Swansea.com Stadium, Swansea
19.35	Try: Deaves 35' c Lewis 47' m C. Jones 73' c Con: O. Williams 36'; Walsh 73'	Report	Try: McGrath 12' m Tector 38' c Slimani 64' c Con: Frawley (1/2) 39'; R. Byrne (1/1) 65'; Pen: Frawley 16'	Attendance: 3,492

15 February 2025	Lions (South Africa)	30–23	(South Africa) Stormers (1 BP)	Ellis Park Stadium, Johannesburg
14:30	Try: van den Berg 19' c van Wyk 22' c Louw 34' c Con: Lombard (3/3) 20', 23', 35'; Pen: Lombard (3/3) 14', 47', 59'	Report	Try: Gelant 44' c Roos 69' c Con: Matthee (2/2) 45', 70'; Pen: Matthee (3/3) 17', 31', 81'	Attendance: 10,919

15 February 2025	Bulls (South Africa)	19–29	(South Africa) Sharks (1 BP)	Loftus Versfeld Stadium, Pretoria
17:00	Try: Wessels 3' c Grobbelaar (2) 45' m, 77' c Con: Kriel (1/2) 3'; Chamberlain (1/1) 77'	Report	Try: Hooker 8' c Jo. Hendrikse 55' m Mavesere 67' c Penxe 71' c Con: Jo. Hendrikse (1/2) 8'; Masuku (2/2) 68', 72'; Pen: Jo. Hendrikse 32'	Attendance: 23,307

15 February 2025	(1 BP) Benetton (Italy)	34–19	(Ireland) Ulster	Stadio Monigo, Treviso
18:15	Try: Gallagher 11' c Mendy 38' c Spagnolo 64' c Izekor 79' c Con: Albornoz (4/4) 12', 39', 65', 80'; Pen: Albornoz (2) 25', 57'	Report	Try: Doak 3' c Lowry 16' c Stockdale 29' m Con: Doak (2/3) 3'; Doak 17'	Attendance: 4,474

15 February 2025	(1 BP) Munster (Ireland)	29–8	(Wales) Scarlets	Thomond Park, Limerick
17:15	Try: McCarthy 20'; G. Coombes (2) 44', 63'; Kendellen 51'; Farrell 81'; Con: Burns (2/5) 21', 52'	Report	Try: Page 57'; Pen: Lloyd 17'	Attendance: 13,714

15 February 2025	(1 BP) Connacht (Ireland)	24–19	(Wales) Cardiff (1BP)	The Sportsground, Galway
19:35	Try: J. Murphy 7' c Hurley-Langton 17' c Heffernan 47' m Tierney-Martin 75' m Con: Ioane (2/4) 8', 18'	Report	Try: Lee-Lo 52' c Donnell 63' m Braley 69' c Con: (2/3) Sheedy 53', 70'	Attendance: 3,648

16 February 2025	Dragons (Wales)	20–45	(Scotland) Glasgow Warriors (1BP)	Rodney Parade, Newport
14:00	Try: Benjamin 10' c Lewis-Hughes 41' c Con: Evans (2/2) 11', 42'; Pen: Evans, 2', 26'	[ Report]	Try: Matthews 22' c Mann 27' m Horne (2) 29' m, 46' c Weir 37' c McBeth 41' c Cancelliere 71' c Con: Weir (5/7) 23', 37', 42', 47', 72'	Attendance: 4,109

=== Round 12 ===
28 February 2025	(2 BP) Munster (Ireland)	28–34	(Scotland) Edinburgh (1 BP)	Musgrave Park, Cork
19:35	Try: Nankivell (2) 14' c, 51' c O'Connor 64' c O'Brien 80' c Con: Burns (3/3) 15', 52', 81'; Butler 65'	Report	Try: Thompson 23' c Currie (3) 28' c, 34' m, 57' m Bradbury 39' c Con: Thompson (3/5) 24', 29', 40'; Pen: Thompson 5'	Attendance: 8,800

28 February 2025	(1BP) Zebre Parma (Italy)	31–21	(Wales) Dragons	Stadio Sergio Lanfranchi, Parma
20:35	Try: Licata 15' c Stavile 39' c Prisciantelli 41' c Paea 59' c Con: Da Re (4/4) 16', 40', 41', 59'; Pen: Prisciantelli 79'	Report	Try: Coghlan (2) 12' c, 25' c Westwood 29' c Con: Reed (3/3) 13', 26', 30'	Attendance: 2,348

1 March 2025	(1 BP) Lions (South Africa)	38–14	(South Africa) Sharks	Ellis Park Stadium, Johannesburg
14:30	Try: Botha 6' c F. Horn 14' c van der Merwe 37' m Kriel 41' m Cairns 59' c Lombard 70' c Con: Lombard (3/5) 7', 15', 60'; Steyn (1/1) 71'	Report	Try: Hooker 77' c Kolisi 80' c Con: Jo. Hendrikse (2/2) 78', 80'	Attendance: 11,542

1 March 2025	(1 BP) Bulls (South Africa)	16–19	(South Africa) Stormers	Loftus Versfeld Stadium, Pretoria
17:00	Try: Vermaak 60' c Con: Kriel (1/1) 61'; Pen: Kriel (3) 5', 24', 26'	Report	Try: Simelane 67' c Con: Matthee (1/1) 68'; Pen: Matthee (4) 1', 15', 32', 37'	Attendance: 34 225; Referee: Griffin Colby

1 March 2025	(1 BP) Leinster (Ireland)	42–24	(Wales) Cardiff (1BP)	Aviva Stadium, Dublin
15:00	Try: McKee 14' c Boyle 40' c Deegan 42' c McGrath 50' c Tector 53' c Russell 75' c Con: R. Byrne (6/6) 15', 41', 42', 51', 54', 77'	Report	Try: Millard 16' m Young 29' c Millard 57' m Bevan 69' c Con: Sheedy (1/3) 30' de Beer (1/1) 70'	Attendance: 17,951; Referee: Andrea Piardi

1 March 2025	Ulster (Ireland)	30–28	(Wales) Scarlets (1 BP)	Ravenhill Stadium, Belfast
17:15	Try: Timoney 22' c Reid 53' c A. O'Connor 77' c Con: Murphy (2/2) 23', 53'; Doak 78'; Pen: Murphy (3) 27', 37', 43'	Report	Try: Page 4' c Nicholas 10' m Fifita 57' c Con: Lloyd (2/3) 5', 58'; Pen: Lloyd (3) 41', 46', 70'	Attendance: 11,717

1 March 2025	(1 BP) Connacht (Ireland)	38–30	(Italy) Benetton	The Sportsground, Galway
19:35	Try: Treacy 5' c Bolton 12' m Boyle 38' c Hurley-Langton 47'; Bolton 66' m Devine 72' c Con: Ioane (3/4) 6', 39', 47'; Hanrahan (1/2) 73'	Report	Try: Mendy 19' c Uren 25' c Zanon 30' c Con: Albornoz (3/3) 20', 26', 31'; Pen: Albornoz (3) 16', 34', 59'	Attendance: 4,217

1 March 2025	(2 BP) Glasgow Warriors (Scotland)	31–32	(Wales) Ospreys (1 BP)	Scotstoun Stadium, Glasgow
19:35	Try: Mann 20' c Schickerling (2) 35' m, 40' c Cordero 70' m McBeth 78' c Con: Weir (3/5) 21', 41', 79'	Report	Try: Morse 3' m Hardy (2) 13' m, 74' c Parry 17' m Giles 37' c Con: Edwards (1/4) 38'; Walsh (1/1) 74'; Pen: Walsh 81'	Attendance: 6,617

=== Round 13 ===
21 March 2025	Cardiff (Wales)	20–17	(South Africa) Lions (1 BP)	Cardiff Arms Park, Cardiff
19:35	Try: Donnell 20' c Millard 63' c Con: Sheedy (2); Pen: Sheedy 31', 50'	Report	Try: Ntlabakanye 11' c Horn 57' c Con: Lombard (2); Pen: Lombard 44'	Attendance: 6,235; Referee: Federico Vedovelli (Italy)

21 March 2025	(1 BP) Glasgow Warriors (Scotland)	28–25	(Ireland) Munster (1 BP)	Scotstoun Stadium
19:35	Try: Horne 27' c Steyn 35' c Fagerson 68' c McBeth 75' c Con: Hastings (4)	Report	Try: Hodnett 16' c O'Brien 22' m, 65' c Con: Butler; Scannell; Pen: Butler 32', 55'	Attendance: 7,321; Referee: Morne Ferreira (South Africa)

22 March 2025	(1 BP) Sharks (South Africa)	35–34	(Italy) Zebre Parma (2 BP)	Kings Park Stadium, Durban
14:45	Try: Kolisi 3' c, 31' c Julius 11' c Koch 36' c Hooker 74' c Con: Hendrikse (5)	Report	Try: Gesi 13' c Ferrari 22' c Prisciantelli 46' c, 49' c Con: Montemauri (4); Pen: Montemauri, 29', 52'	Attendance: 9,935

22 March 2025	Benetton (Italy)	21–18	(Scotland) Edinburgh (1 BP)	Stadio Monigo, Treviso
16:00	Try: Mendy 32'; Odogwu 62'; Pen: Umaga 6', 36'	Report	Try: McCann 17' c Ashman 48'; Con: Thompson; Pen: Thompson 29', 43'	Attendance: 4,985

22 March 2025	Bulls (South Africa)	21–20	(Ireland) Leinster (1 BP)	Loftus Versfeld Stadium, Pretoria
17:00	Try: Grobbelaar 70' m Penalty try 57'; Pen: Johannes 2', 40'; Kriel 80+4'	Report	Try: Berrett 3' c Osborne 43' c Con: R. Byrne (2); Pen: R. Byrne 17', 77'	Attendance: 15,299; Referee: Ben Whitehouse

22 March 2025	(1 BP) Dragons (Wales)	30–34	(Ireland) Ulster (1 BP)	Rodney Parade, Newport
17:15	Try: Owen 1' c Anderson 20' c Williams 34' c Con: Reed (3); Pen: Reed 14', 47', 63'	Report	Try: Hume 9' c Herring, 28' c, 44' c Wilson, 70' c Con: Doak (3); Cooney; Pen: Cooney 65', 80'	Attendance: 5,950

22 March 2025	(1 BP) Ospreys (Wales)	43–40	(Ireland) Connacht (2 BP)	Swansea.com Stadium, Swansea
17:15	Try: Giles 16' c, 32' c Hardy 34' c Kasende 35' c, 56'; Walsh 43' c Con: Edwards (5/6); Pen: Edwards 4'	Report	Try: Treacy 1' c Hurley-Langton 13' c, 69' m Heffernan 47' c O'Conor 48' c Murphy 67' c Con: Ioane (2/2); Hanrahan (3/4)	Attendance: 3,416

22 March 2025	Scarlets (Wales)	17–29	(South Africa) Stormers (1 BP)	Parc y Scarlets, Llanelli
15:35	Try: Mee 29' c Nicholas 47' c Con: Lloyd (2/2); Pen: Lloyd 58'		Try: Loader 13'; Fourie 17' c Zas 64' c Venter 78' c Con: Feinberg-Mngomezulu (3/4); Pen: Feinberg-Mngomezulu 43'	Attendance: 5,783; Referee: Eoghan Cross (Ireland)

=== Round 14 ===
28 March 2025	(1 BP) Ulster (Ireland)	38–34	(South Africa) Stormers (2 BP)	Ravenhill Stadium, Belfast
19:35	Try: Baloucoune 11'; Warwick 29' c Murphy 40'; Stockdale 44' c Ward 55' c Moore 66' c Con: Cooney 30', 45'; Murphy, 56'; Doak 67'	Report:ESPN; Report:BBC	Try: Roos 2' c, 75' c Loader 7' c Engelbrecht 62' c Con: Feinberg-Mngomezulu 3', 8', 63', 76'; Pen: Feinberg-Mngomezulu 6', 51'	Attendance: 11,672

28 March 2025	(1 BP) Edinburgh (Scotland)	38–5	(Wales) Dragons	Hive Stadium, Edinburgh
19:35	Try: Harrison 16', 19' c Graham 24' c Schoeman 37' c Venter 65' c Currie 79'; Con: Thompson 20', 25', 38'; Scott 65'	Report	Try: Wainwright 47'	Attendance: 6,240

29 March 2025	(2 BP) Connacht (Ireland)	24–30	(Ireland) Munster (1 BP)	MacHale Park, Castlebar
14:30	Try: Jansen 21', 62'; Blade 45'; Ioane 73'; Con: Ioane 45'; Hanrahan 63'	Report:ESPN	Try: Ahern 24', Casey 23'; Crowley 51'; Barron 59'; Con: Crowley 52', 13'; Pen: Crowley 7', 38'	Attendance: 27,580

29 March 2025	(1 BP) Bulls (South Africa)	63–24	(Italy) Zebre Parma	Loftus Versfeld Stadium, Pretoria
14:45	Try: Petersen 3', 73'; Burger 13'; Jacobs 30'; Wessels 36'; Van Staden 47'; Coetzee 59'; Vorster 65'; Kriel 75'; Con: Johannes 4', 14', 31', 37', 48', 60', 66'; Chamberlain 74', 76'	Report:ESPN	Try: Trulla 20'; Montemauri 41'; Bartolomeo 57'; Con: Montemauri 20', 41'; Da Re 58'; Drop: Fusco 27'	Attendance: 7,673

29 March 2025	(1 BP) Scarlets (Wales)	38–22	(Wales) Ospreys	Parc y Scarlets, Llanelli
15:00	Try: Murray 21'; Fifita 40'; Roberts 44'; James 50'; Plumtree 61'; Con: Lloyd 45', 51', 62'	Report:BBC; Report:ESPN	Try: Morris 1'; Hopkins 14'; Edwards 75'; Con: Edwards 1', 15'; Pen: Edwards 8'	Attendance: 11,384

29 March 2025	(1 BP) Sharks (South Africa)	7–10	(Ireland) Leinster	Kings Park Stadium, Durban
19:15	Try: Mbonambi 52; Con: Hendrikse 53'	Report:ESPN; Report:The Citizen	Try: McErlean 19'; Penny 48'	Attendance: 28,229

29 March 2025	Benetton (Italy)	20–19	(Wales) Cardiff (1 BP)	Stadio Monigo, Treviso
20:35	Try: Albornoz 20'; Con: Albornoz 21'; Pen: Albornoz 9', 77'	Report:ESPN	Try: Botham 6'; Bevan 16'; Lloyd 68'; Con: Sheedy 7', 17'	Attendance: 4,715

29 March 2025	(1 BP) Glasgow Warriors (Scotland)	42–0	(South Africa) Lions	Scotstoun Stadium, Glasgow
19:35	Try: McBeth 6'; Dobie 18', 26'; Horne 30'; Hastings 38'; Stewart 44'; Con: Hastings 7', 19', 27', 31', 39', 44'	Report:ESPN		Attendance: 6,629

=== Round 15 ===
18 April 2025	(1 BP) Edinburgh (Scotland)	17–18	(South Africa) Sharks	Hive Stadium, Edinburgh
19:35	Try: Lang 11'; Ritchie 27'; Ashman 47' c Con: Ashamn (1/3) 47'	Report	Try: Fassi 41'; Mapimpi 80'; Con: Hendrikse (1/2) 41'; Pen: Hendrikse 3', 38'	Attendance: 7,774; Referee: Andrew Brace

19 April 2025	(1 BP) Lions (South Africa)	31–42	(Italy) Benetton (1 BP)	Ellis Park Stadium, Johannesburg
13:45	Try: Venter 27'; Louw 41'; E. van der Merwe 61'; Pretorius 77'; Con: Wolhuter 28', 42', 62', 77'; Pen: Wolhuter 6'	Report	Try: Umaga 7'; Mendy 13', 38'; Marin 23'; Ruzza 44'; Con: Umaga 8', 24', 39', 44'; Pen: Umaga 18', 35', 65'	Attendance: 3 740; Referee: Craig Evans

19 April 2025	Ospreys (Wales)	19–36	(Wales) Cardiff (1BP)	Millennium Stadium, Cardiff
15:00	Try: Williams 11'; Spencer 60'; Hardy 76'; Con: Edwards 11', 77'		Try: Mann 15', 35'; Hamer-Webb 20', 29', 80'; Penalty try 79'; Con: Sheedy 16'; Thomas 81'	Attendance: 28,328; Referee: Ben Connor

19 April 2025	(1 BP)Stormers (South Africa)	34–29	(Ireland) Connacht (2 BP)	Cape Town Stadium, Cape Town
16:00	Try: Feinberg-Mngomezulu 3', 19', 26'; Roos 14'; Hartzenberg 48'; Con: Feinberg-Mngomezulu 4', 15', 20; Pen: Feinberg-Mngomezulu 72'		Try: Jennings 7', 41'; Oliver 17'; Tierney-Martin 36'; Murphy 66'; Con: Carty 8', 18'	Attendance: 18,211; Referee: Sam Grove-White

19 April 2025	(1 BP) Munster (Ireland)	13–16	(South Africa) Bulls	Thomond Park, Limerick
17:15	Try: Abrahams 37'; Con: Crowley 38'; Pen: Crowley 9', 51'	Report	Try: Coetzee 16'; Con: Goosen 16'; Pen: Goosen 23', 49'; Johannes 73'	Attendance: 14,733; Referee: Andrea Piardi

19 April 2025	Dragons (Wales)	23–31	(Wales) Scarlets (1 BP)	Millennium Stadium, Cardiff
17:30	Try: Rosser 26', 46'; Hewitt 42'; Con: O'Brien 43'; Pen: O'Brien 40', 58'	Report	Try: Thomas 20'; Hepburn 51'; Fifita 55'; Murray 72'; Con: Lloyd 21', 51', 56', 73; Pen: Lloyd 80+1'	Attendance: 28,328; Referee: Aimee Barrett-Theron

19 April 2025	(1 BP) Leinster (Ireland)	41–17	(Ireland) Ulster	Aviva Stadium, Dublin
19:35	Try: O'Brien 20'; Clarkson 27' c Penalty try 33'; Ringrose 42'; Sheehan 58', 69' c, 78'; Con: Frawley 28'; Prendergast 70'	Reports:1; 2	Try: Izuchukwu 36'; McCann 73'; Con: Murphy 37', 74'; Pen: Murphy 8'	Attendance: 18,422; Referee: Gianluca Gnecchi

19 April 2025	Zebre Parma (Italy)	6–14	(Scotland) Glasgow Warriors	Stadio Sergio Lanfranchi, Parma
20:35	Pen: Da Re 8', 31'	Report	Try: McKay 43'; McDowall 52'; Con: Jordan 44', 52'	Attendance: 2,067

=== Round 16 ===
25 April 2025	(1 BP) Glasgow Warriors (Scotland)	19–26	(South Africa) Bulls	Scotstoun Stadium, Glasgow
19:35	Try: Dobie 34'; Steyn 77'; McDowall 79'; Con: Horne 38', 80'	Report, 2	Try: Greobbelaar 52'; Kriel 59'; Con: Goosen 53', 60'; Pen: Goosen 17', 24', 40', 55'	Attendance: 7,431; Referee: Andrew Brace

25 April 2025	(1 BP) Cardiff (Wales)	26–21	(Ireland) Munster (1 BP)	Cardiff Arms Park
19:35	Try: Hamer-Webb 26'; Millard 28'; Penalty try 54'; Mulder 63'; Con: Sheedy 28', 64'	Report, 2	Try: Nash 12'; Haley 37'; Farrell 50'; Con: Crowley 13', 38', 51'	Attendance: 11,253; Referee: Gianluca Gnecchi

25 April 2025	Zebre Parma (Italy)	25–25	(Scotland) Edinburgh	Stadio Sergio Lanfranchi, Parma
20:35	Try: Fusco 27', 38'; Trulla 40'; Con: Da Re 29', 42'; Pen: Montemauri 73', 79'	Report, 2	Try: Venter 53', 63; Currie 80'; Con: Thompson 64'; Scott 80+1'; Pen: Thompson 22', 24'	Attendance: 2,568; Referee: Ben Connor

26 April 2025	Lions (South Africa)	26–7	(Ireland) Connacht	Ellis Park Stadium, Johannesburg
16:00	Try: Du Plessis 14'; Pretorius 70'; Van der Merwe 80+3'; Con: Dobela 80+4'; Pen: Wolhuter 19', 37', 43'	Report, 2	Try: De Buitlear 74'; Con: Hawkshaw 74'	Attendance: 3,454; Referee: Hollie Davidson

26 April 2025	(1 BP) Ospreys (Wales)	57–24	(Wales) Dragons	Swansea.com Stadium
15:00	Try: Spencer 25'; Lake 34'; Warren 45'; Giles 50', 78'; Dan Edwards 56', 59'; Hardy 71'; Morgan-Williams 79'; Con: Edwards 26', 35', 46', 51', 60'; Walsh 79'	Report, 2	Try: Rees-Weldon 23'; R. Williams 55'; Rosser 65'; Con: O'Brien 24', 55', 66'; Pen: O'Brien 18'	Attendance: 4,677

26 April 2025	(1 BP) Stormers (South Africa)	56–5	(Italy) Benetton	Cape Town Stadium
18:15	Try: Sandi 4'; Du Plessis 16'; Senatla 33'; Theuinssen 43'; Zas 65'; De Villiers 70'; Feinberg-Mngomezulu 79'; Con: Feinberg-Mngomezulu 4', 17', 34', 44', 66', 80'; Pen: Feinberg-Mngomezulu 10', 20'; Drop: Feinberg-Mngomezulu 14'	Report, [ 2]	Try: Umaga 41'	Attendance: 18,474; Referee: Adam Jones

26 April 2025	(1 BP) Scarlets (Wales)	35–22	(Ireland) Leinster	Parc y Scarlets, Llanelli
17:15	Try: Davies 9'; Rogers 22'; Plumtree 30'; Roberts 42'; Con: Costelow 9', 31', 43'; Pen: Costelow 13'; Lloyd 55' 79'		Try: J. Osborne 24'; Mangan 35'; Culhane 48'; Con: Byrne 25', 49'; Pen: Byrne, 18'	Attendance: 7,381; Referee: Mike Adamson

26 April 2025	(1 BP) Ulster (Ireland)	19–22	(South Africa) Sharks	Ravenhill Stadium, Belfast
19:35	Try: Murphy 7'; Postlethwaite 10'; Doak 30'; Con: Murphy 10', 31'	Report, 2	Try: Mapimpi 34'; Tshituka 61'; Julius 70'; Con: Hendrikse 62', 71'; Pen: Hendrikse 78'	Attendance: 16,350; Referee: Ben Whitehouse

=== Round 17 ===
9 May 2025	(1 BP) Sharks (South Africa)	29–10	(Wales) Ospreys	Kings Park Stadium, Durban
19:00	Try: Jenkins 10'; Esterhuizen 33'; Hooker 51'; Buthelezi 65'; Con: Masuku 11', 52'; Pen: Fassi 34'; Masuku, 81'	Report	Try: Parry 60'; Con: Edwards 61'; Pen: Edwards 2'	Attendance: 11,599

9 May 2025	(1 BP) Munster (Ireland)	38–20	(Ireland) Ulster	Thomond Park, Limerick
19:35	Try: Milne 13'; Farrell 24', 55'; Beirne 28'; Scannell 35'; O'Mahony 58'; Con: Crowley 29', 36', 56', 59'	Report, 2	Try: McCloskey 6'; Postlethwaite 26'; Con: Murphy 7', 27'; Pen: Murphy 18', 41'	Attendance: 17,684

10 May 2025	(1 BP) Bulls (South Africa)	45–21	(Wales) Cardiff	Loftus Versfeld Stadium, Pretoria
16:45	Try: Vorster 7'; Louw 16'; Moodie 21'; Hanekom 38'; De Klerk 42', 52'; Con: Goosen 8'; Johannes 17', 22', 39', 43', 53'; Pen: Goosen 3'		Try: Mann 47'; T. Williams 72'; Hamer-Webb 76'; Con: B. Thomas 48', 73', 77'	Attendance: 11,497

10 May 2025	(1 BP) Stormers (South Africa)	48–12	(Wales) Dragons	Cape Town Stadium
18:15	Try: Simelane 2', 80'; Senatla 36'; Ungerer 50', Willemse 56'; Hartzenberg 73'; De Wet 78'; Con: Feinberg-Mngomezulu 2', 37', 57'; Willemse 74', 79; Pen: Feinberg-Mngomezulu 48'; Cards: Moerat (yellow card) 40'	Report	Try: Wainwright 44'; Blacker 71'; Con: Evans 71'	Attendance: 13,864

10 May 2025	(1 BP) Leinster (Ireland)	76–5	(Italy) Zebre Parma	Aviva Stadium, Dublin
17:15	Try: Kelleher 3'; McGrath 5'; Baird 18'; Barrett 25', 30'; Lowe 40'; Prendergast 43'; Van der Flier 48'; J. Osborne 55', 80'; Frawley 60'; Culhane 76'; Con: Prendergast 4', 19', 26', 30', 44', 50'; Frawley 76', 80+1'	Report	Try: Garcia 66'	Attendance: 14,681

10 May 2025	(1 BP) Benetton (Italy)	33–7	(Scotland) Glasgow Warriors	Stadio Monigo, Treviso
18:15	Try: Odogwu 6'; Maile 8'; Smith 26'; Menoncello 52'; Umaga 57'; Con: Umaga 6', 9', 53', 58'	Report	Try: Jones 64'; Con: Horne 65'	Attendance: 5,000

10 May 2025	Connacht (Ireland)	21–31	(Scotland) Edinburgh (1 BP)	The Sportsground, Galway
19:35	Try: Treacy 42', 52'; Con: Hanrahan 42', 53'		Try: Schoeman 8'; Watson 27'; Muncaster 58'; Con: Thompson 9', 28'	Attendance: 6,056

11 May 2025	Lions (South Africa)	19–32	(Wales) Scarlets (1 BP)	Ellis Park Stadium, Johannesburg
15:00				Attendance: 2,522

=== Round 18 ===
16 May 2025	(1 BP) Stormers (South Africa)	34–24	(Wales) Cardiff (1 BP)	Cape Town Stadium
19:00	Try: Zas 10', 33'; Hartzenberg 25', 47'; Evans 72'; Con: Willemse (2/4) 25', 34'; Feinberg-Mngomezulu (1/1) 73'; Pen: Feinberg-Mngomezulu 80'; Cards: Willemse (red card) 59'	Report	Try: Southworth 14'; Hamer-Webb 37'; Millard 57'; Hughes 77'; Con: Sheedy (2/4) 15', 78'; Cards: Southworth (red card) 29'	Attendance: 19,256

16 May 2025	(1 BP) Edinburgh (Scotland)	47–17	(Ireland) Ulster	Edinburgh Rugby Stadium
19:35	Try: Graham 9', 74', 81'; Bradbury 16', 53'; Ashman 34'; Schoeman 59'; Con: Thompson 10', 35', 54', 60'; Healy 75', 82'	Report, 2	Try: Kok 29'; Postlethwaite 73'; Penalty try	Attendance: 7,989

16 May 2025	(1 BP) Munster (Ireland)	30–21	(Italy) Benetton	Musgrave Park, Cork
20:00	Try: Crowley 14'; Barron 44'; Abrahams 49'; Wycherley 73'; Con: Crowley (1/2) 15'; Casey (1/2) 50'; Pen: Crowley 21'; Casey 57'		Try: Smith (2) 19', 28'; Bernasconi 69'; Con: Umaga (3/3) 20', 29', 70'	Attendance: 8,800

17 May 2025	(1 BP) Bulls (South Africa)	55–15	(Wales) Dragons	Loftus Versfeld Stadium, Pretoria
15:00	Try: Kriel 5'; Wises 8'; De Klerk 22'; Van der Merwe 40', 51'; Petersen 58', 62'; Coetzee 64'; Williams 69'; Con: Johannes (6/9) 9', 23', 41', 58', 65', 70'	Report, 2	Try: Anderson 43'; Williams 49'; Morgan 75'	Attendance: 6,836

17 May 2025	(1 BP) Lions (South Africa)	29–28	(Wales) Ospreys (2 BP)	Ellis Park Stadium, Johannesburg
17:15	Try: Van der Merwe 10'; Visagie 31', 54'; Van Wyk 71'; Dobela 82'; Con: Dobela, 32', 72'	Report	Try: Griffiths 11'; Ratti 52'; Walsh 62'; Parry 78'; Con: Edwards 12', 53', 63', 79'	Attendance: 3,494

17 May 2025	Zebre Parma (Italy)	12–22	(Ireland) Connacht	Stadio Sergio Lanfranchi, Parma
18:00	Try: Stavile 37'; Trulla 70'; Con: Montemauri 38'	Report	Try: Prendergast 17'; Bolton 28'; Hurley-Langton 61'; Con: Hanrahan 18', 61'; Pen: Hanrahan 79'	Attendance: 3,753

17 May 2025	Sharks (South Africa)	12–3	(Wales) Scarlets	Kings Park Stadium, Durban
19:30	Pen: Masuku 39'; Fassi 53', 69', 80'	Report	Pen: Costelow 41'	Attendance: 12,109

17 May 2025	Leinster (Ireland)	13–5	(Scotland) Glasgow Warriors	Aviva Stadium, Dublin
19:35	Try: O'Brien 27'; Con: Prendergast 28'; Pen: Prendergast 54'; Frawley 79'	Report	Try: Horne 56'	Attendance: 17,654

== Knockout stage ==
The top eight teams in the regular season standings advanced to the knockout stage, a single-elimination tournament culminating in a Grand Final to crown the overall champion.

Teams were seeded based on the regular season standings, with teams ranked 1-4 receiving home field advantage in the quarter-final, with 1 playing 8, 2 playing 7 etc. The top two teams in the standings were seeded so as not to meet until the Grand Final. The four home quarter finalists were confirmed as Leinster, Glasgow Warriors, Bulls and Sharks in Round 17 when Sharks defeated Ospreys 29–10. With a 76–5 victory over Zebre Parma, Leinster Rugby confirmed their number one seeding for a third year out of four, and home field advantage for the duration of their campaign in the play-offs.

Home field advantage for the semi-finals and Grand Final was awarded to the highest ranked team in each tie; the top two teams were therefore guaranteed home advantage until the final for as long as they remain in the tournament, and the top ranked team in the standings were awarded home advantage should they reach the Grand Final. In three seasons of the URC, no number one ranked team from the regular season had yet made the Grand Final, and of the three finals, two have been won by the visiting team. This season, however, for the first time since becoming the United Rugby Championship, the top seed, Leinster, succeeded in reaching the final where they would face the second seed, Bulls as the quarter- and semi-finals of the competition exactly followed the seeding. This also meant the first URC Grand Final to be held outside South Africa.

=== Bracket ===
Quarter-finals
1	(Ireland) Leinster	33
8	(Wales) Scarlets	21
4	(Scotland) Glasgow Warriors	36
5	(South Africa) Stormers	18
3	(South Africa) Sharks	24 ^{(6)}
6	(Ireland) Munster	24 ^{(4)}
2	(South Africa) Bulls	42
7	(Scotland) Edinburgh	33

Semi-finals
1	(Ireland) Leinster	37
4	(Scotland) Glasgow Warriors	19
2	(South Africa) Bulls	25
3	(South Africa) Sharks	13

Final
1	(Ireland) Leinster	32
2	(South Africa) Bulls	7

=== Quarter-finals ===
30 May 2025	Glasgow Warriors (Scotland)	36–18	(South Africa) Stormers	Scotstoun Stadium, Glasgow
19:35	Try: Darge 10'; Rowe 15', 46'; Venter 28'; Horne 52'; Con: Horne 11', 16', 47', 53'; Pen: Horne 56'	Report. 2	Try: Senatla 26', 43'; Con: Feinberg-Mngomezulu 27'; Pen: Feinberg-Mngomezulu 7', 19'; Cards: Senatla (yellow card) 9'	Attendance: 6,867
Line up :Josh McKay, Kyle Rowe, Stafford McDowall, Sione Tuipulotu, Kyle Steyn, Tom Jordan, George Horne, Jamie Bhatti, Gregor Hiddleston, Murphy Walker, Alex Samuel, Scott Cummings, Euan Ferrie, Rory Darge, Henco Venter; Replacements : Johnny Matthews, Nathan McBeth, Sam Talakai, Max Williamson, Jack Mann, Macenzzie Duncan, Jamie Dobie, Adam Hastings				Attendance: 6,867

31 May 2025	Bulls (South Africa)	42–33	(Scotland) Edinburgh	Loftus Versfeld Stadium, Pretoria
12:30	Try: Hanekom 19'; Kriel 32'; Vorster 37'; Moodie 43'; Johannes 47'; Nortjé 52'; Con: Johannes 44', 48', 53'; Pen: Johannes 11', 62'; Cards: De Klerk (yellow card) 3'; Van Heerden (yellow card) 59'		Try: Goosen 5', 64'; Thompson 14', 29'; Ashman 59'; Con: Thompson 6', 15', 30', 60'; Cards: Thompson (yellow card) 61'	Attendance: 20,056

31 May 2025	Leinster (Ireland)	33–21	(Wales) Scarlets	Aviva Stadium, Dublin
15:00	Try: Lowe 5'; Gibson-Park 10'; Osborne 46'; Keenan 60'; Con: Prendergast 10', 46'; Pen: Prendergast 36', 66', 74'	Report	Try: Rogers 20'; Murray 41'; J. Williams 71'; Con: Costelow 21', 42'; Lloyd 71'; Cards: Hepburn (yellow card) 56'; Fifita (yellow card) 73'	Attendance: 12,879; Referee: Andrew McMenemy (SRU)

31 May 2025	Sharks (South Africa)	24–24 (a.e.t) ( 6-4 on pens.)	(Ireland) Munster	Kings Park Stadium, Durban
17:30	Try: Hooker 46'; Fassi 68'; Mbatha 73'; Con: Jaden Hendrikse 47', 69', 74'; Pen: Jaden Hendrikse 55' Shootout; Jordan Hendrikse; Jaden Hendrikse; Davids; Jordan Hendrikse; Jaden Hendrikse; Davids		Try: Nash 10'; Josh Wycherley 57'; Kilgallen 61'; Con: Crowley 11', 58', 62'; Pen: Murray 77' Shootout; Crowley; Scannell; Murray; Crowley; Scannell	Attendance: 22,247

=== Semi-finals ===
7 June 2025	Leinster (Ireland)	37–19	(Scotland) Glasgow Warriors	Aviva Stadium, Dublin
	Try: Sheehan, 3', 41'; Osborne, 28', 54'; Clarkson, 33'; Frawley, 58'; Con: Prendergast (2/6), 4', 55'; Pen: Prendergast (1/2), 23'	Report, 2	Try: Horne, 5'; Dobie, 72'; Tuipulotu, 79'; Con: Jordan (2/2), 72', 79' (Horne (0/1))	Attendance: 15,762

7 June 2025	Bulls (South Africa)	25–13	(South Africa) Sharks	Loftus Versfeld Stadium, Pretoria
	Try: de Klerk, 8'; Moodie, 22'; Kriel, 67'; Con: Goosen, 9'; Johannes, 68'; Pen: Goosen, 36'; Johannes, 57'; Cards: Vorster, (yellow card) 29' to 39'; Hanekom, (yellow card) 37' to 47'; Coetzee (yellow card) 40' to 50'	Report	Try: Mapimpi, 45'; Hooker, 53'; Con: Jordan Hendrikse, 27'	Attendance: 47,214

== URC Grand Final ==
For the first time since it became the United Rugby Championship, the highest seeded team made the final, and faced the second seed, as all six knockout matches were won by the team with home advantage. Leinster hosted the Bulls in Croke Park, the first URC final to be held outside South Africa, and the first appearance of Leinster in a final since the format began. Bulls reached a record third final. Both teams needed their first URC title, although it would be Leinster's ninth total championship in all formats of the competition. and their twelfth play-off Grand Final, while the Bulls carried three championships from their previous competition, Super Rugby. This final was the first between the two teams.

In their previous meeting this season, in Round 13, Bulls inflicted the first defeat of the season across all competitions on Leinster, 21–20 in Pretoria. In all previous URC meetings going back to 2021, Bulls lead Leinster four wins to two, including both previous play-off meetings.

In the final, Leinster proved much too strong for the Bulls in wet conditions, racing to a 19–0 lead at half time. A Bulls try early in the second half briefly raised hopes of a comeback, but Leinster saw out a dominant win with a further try and two penalties, confirming a 32–7 win for their ninth championship in total. The Bulls were consigned to a third URC final defeat in four years.

14 June 2025	Leinster (Ireland)	32–7	(South Africa) Bulls	Croke Park, Dublin
	Try: Conan 6'; Barrett 14'; Van der Flier 23'; Gunne 73'; Con: Prendergast 7', 14'; Byrne 74'; Pen: Prendergast 45', 68'		Try: Van der Merwe 51'; Con: Goosen 51'	Attendance: 46,127; Referee: Andrea Piardi (Italy)

== 2024-25 URC Awards ==
In June 2025, the league announced its award winners for the year. The most prestigious award, the Player's Player of the Year, was won by RG Snyman of Leinster.

Award	Sponsor	Winner	Team	Notes
URC Players' Player of the Year	BTK	(South Africa) RG Snyman	(Ireland) Leinster	Award by vote of URC players
URC Coaches' Coach of the Year	—N/a	(Italy) Massimo Brunello	(Italy) Zebre Parma	Award by vote of URC coaches.
URC Golden Boot	Gilbert	(Wales) Ioan Lloyd	(Wales) Scarlets	Awarded to the top scorer from the boot, with 128 points.
URC Top Try Scorer	OFX	(Wales) Harri Millard	(Wales) Cardiff Rugby	Awarded to the top try scorer with 9 tries, and fewest on-field minutes per try.
URC Try of the Season	URC.tv	(South Africa) Deon Fourie	(South Africa) Stormers	Awarded to the best regular season try as chosen by fan vote.
URC Playmaker of the Year	—N/a	(Ireland) Tom Farrell	(Ireland) Munster	Inaugural award based upon points for defenders beaten (1), successful offloads (2) and try assists (3). 158 points comes from five try assists (15 points), 41 offloads (82 points), and 61 defenders beaten (61 points).
URC 'Tackle Machine'	—N/a	(South Africa) Ruben van Heerden	(South Africa) Stormers	Awarded to player that topped league tackle count with 171 tackles with 98% accuracy
URC 'Ironman'	—N/a	(Wales) Cam Winnett	(Wales) Cardiff Rugby	Awarded to player with most regular season minutes played - 1427 minutes (max 1440)
URC Next-Gen Player of the Year	—N/a	(South Africa) Cameron Hanekom	(South Africa) Bulls	Awarded to young player of the year. Selected by rugby media.
URC South African Player of the Year	Vodacom	(South Africa) Sacha Feinburg-Mngomezulu	(South Africa) Stormers	Awarded to best player from a South African Shield. Sponsored by South African naming sponsor. Voted on by coaches and media in South Africa.
URC Innovation Award	—N/a	(South Africa) Sharks		Team award.

=== URC 'Elite XV' Team of the Year ===
The League announced its 'Elite XV' team of the year in June 2025. Munster and Bulls were the most represented teams, with three players each in the XV.

Position	Number	Player	Team
FB	15	(Ireland) Jamie Osborne	(Ireland) Leinster
RW	14	(Scotland) Darcy Graham	(Scotland) Edinburgh
OC	13	(Ireland) Tom Farrell	(Ireland) Munster
IC	12	(South Africa) Andre Esterhuizen	(South Africa) Sharks
LW	11	(Wales) Blair Murray	(Wales) Scarlets
FH	10	(South Africa) Sacha Feinberg-Mngomezulu	(South Africa) Stormers
SH	9	(Ireland) Craig Casey	(Ireland) Munster
N8	8	(South Africa) Cameron Hanekom	(South Africa) Bulls
OF	7	(Scotland) Rory Darge	(Scotland) Glasgow Warriors
BF	6	(Wales) Jac Morgan	(Wales) Ospreys
RL	5	(Ireland) Tadhg Beirne	(Ireland) Munster
LL	4	(South Africa) RG Snyman	(Ireland) Leinster
TP	3	(South Africa) Wilco Louw	(South Africa) Bulls
HK	2	(South Africa) Marnus van der Merwe	(Wales) Scarlets
LP	1	(South Africa) Jan-Hendrik Wessels	(South Africa) Bulls

== Leading scorers ==
Note: Flags to the left of player names indicate national team as has been defined under World Rugby eligibility rules, or primary nationality for players who have not yet earned international senior caps. Players may hold one or more non-WR nationalities. Includes post season points scored.

As of 7 June 2025

=== Most points ===
Rank	Player	Club	Points
1	(Scotland) Ross Thompson	(Scotland) Edinburgh	128
2	(Wales) Ioan Lloyd	(Wales) Scarlets	126
3	(South Africa) Jordan Hendrikse	(South Africa) Sharks	121
4	(Wales) Dan Edwards	(Wales) Ospreys	120
5	(South Africa) Sacha Feinberg-Mngomezulu	(South Africa) Stormers	98
6	(South Africa) David Kriel	(South Africa) Bulls	90
6	(England) Jacob Umaga	(Italy) Benetton	90
8	(Ireland) Ross Byrne	(Ireland) Leinster	78
9	(Scotland) George Horne	(Scotland) Glasgow Warriors	72
10	(Ireland) Sam Prendergast	(Ireland) Leinster	70

=== Most tries ===
Rank	Player	Club	Tries
1	(Ireland) Tom Farrell	(Ireland) Munster	9
1	(Scotland) George Horne	(Scotland) Glasgow Warriors	9
1	(Wales) Harri Millard	(Wales) Cardiff	9
1	(South Africa) Canan Moodie	(South Africa) Bulls	9
1	(Wales) Blair Murray	(Wales) Scarlets	9
1	(South Africa) Leolin Zas	(South Africa) Stormers	9
7	(Scotland) Jamie Dobie	(Scotland) Glasgow Warriors	8
7	(Wales) Gabriel Hamer-Webb	(Wales) Cardiff	8
7	(South Africa) Ethan Hooker	(South Africa) Sharks	8
7	(South Africa) David Kriel	(South Africa) Bulls	8
7	(Scotland) Johnny Matthews	(Scotland) Glasgow Warriors	8
7	(South Africa) Edwill van der Merwe	(South Africa) Lions	8

== Attendances ==
=== Attendances by club ===
Regular season

Club	Home games	Total	Average	Highest	Lowest
(Italy) Benetton	9	40,020	4,447	5,000	3,243
(South Africa) Bulls	9	128,187	14,245	34,225	5,500
(Wales) Cardiff	9	83,903	9,323	12,125	6,235
(Ireland) Connacht	9	64,201	7,133	27,580	3,470
(Wales) Dragons	9	69,601	7,733	28,328	4,109
(Scotland) Edinburgh	9	94,812	10,535	40,063	5,494
(Scotland) Glasgow	9	81,156	9,017	27,538	6,277
(Ireland) Leinster	9	241,373	26,930	80,498	12,867
(South Africa) Lions	9	60,288	6,699	19,981	2,194
(Ireland) Munster	9	129,931	14,437	26,267	8,193
(Wales) Ospreys	9	60,626	6,736	28,328	2,832
(Wales) Scarlets	9	61,549	6,839	11,384	5,080
(South Africa) Sharks	9	175,872	19,541	34,827	9,935
(South Africa) Stormers	9	226,377	25,153	47,171	12,976
(Ireland) Ulster	9	118,582	13,196	16,491	11,533
(Italy) Zebre	9	22,663	2,630	5,000	1,187

Play-offs

Club	Home games	Total	Average
(South Africa) Bulls	2	67,270	33,635
(Scotland) Glasgow	1	6,867	6,867
(Ireland) Leinster	3	74,768	24,923
(South Africa) Sharks	1	22,247	22,247

=== Highest attendances ===
By Round

The all-time attendance record for a single round was broken in round 8, and then again in round 9 with a total attendance of 153,398 and 160,780 respectively.

Individual matches

As in previous season, the largest attendances were broadly in 'derby' games which counted for the regional shields, the largest of which created a league record 80,468 for Leinster versus Munster at Croke Park, Dublin. The Grand Final also achieved a sizeable crowd, coming in fourth in the list of attendances for the season. Further down, Connacht continued the recent tradition of bumper crowds in one-off Irish derbies at GAA stadia, with an attendance of over 27,000 at MacHale Park, Castlebar, Mayo to face Munster easily beating the record for a Connacht home match.

Grand Final Irish Shield tie Welsh Shield tie Scottish-Italian Shield tie South African Shield tie

Rank	Attendance	Date	Home	Score	Away	Venue
1	80,468	12 October 2024	Leinster	28–12	Munster	(Ireland) Croke Park, Dublin
2	47,214	7 June 2025	Bulls	25–13	Sharks	(South Africa) Loftus Versfeld Stadium, Pretoria
3	47,171	8 February 2025	Stormers	32–33	Bulls	(South Africa) Cape Town Stadium
4	46,127	14 June 2025	Leinster	32–7	Bulls	(Ireland) Croke Park, Dublin
5	46,002	28 December 2024	Stormers	24–20	Sharks	(South Africa) Cape Town Stadium
6	40,063	28 December 2024	Edinburgh	10–7	Glasgow Warriors	(Scotland) Murrayfield Stadium, Edinburgh
7	34,827	21 December 2024	Sharks	20–17	Bulls	(South Africa) Kings Park Stadium, Durban
8	34,225	1 March 2025	Bulls	16–19	Stormers	(South Africa) Loftus Versfeld Stadium, Pretoria
9	33,903	21 December 2024	Leinster	20–12	Connacht	(Ireland) Aviva Stadium, Dublin
10	33,744	30 November 2024	Sharks	21–13	Stormers	(South Africa) Kings Park Stadium, Durban
11	28,328	19 April 2025	Ospreys; Dragons	19–36; 23–31	Cardiff; Scarlets	(Wales) Principality Stadium (Judgement Day double header)
12	28,229	29 March 2025	Sharks	7–10	Leinster	(South Africa) Kings Park Stadium, Durban
13	28,013	19 October 2024	Stormers	24–19	Munster	(South Africa) Cape Town Stadium
14	27,580	29 March 2025	Connacht	24–30	Munster	(Ireland) MacHale Park, Castlebar, Mayo
15	27,538	22 December 2024	Glasgow Warriors	33–14	Edinburgh	(Scotland) Hampden Park, Glasgow
16	26,267	27 December 2024	Munster	7–28	Leinster	(Ireland) Thomond Park, Limerick
