= 2021–22 Indigo Group Premiership =

Welsh rugby union competition for clubs

- Countries: Wales
- Date: 9 September 2021 - 7 May 2022
- Champions: Cardiff (4th title)
- Relegated: NONE
- Matches played: 66

The 2021–22 Indigo Group Premiership was the second season of the new format of the Welsh Premiership, the top tier of club rugby in Wales run by the Welsh Rugby Union. It was contested by twelve Welsh clubs following a reduction from sixteen teams at the end of the 2018–19 season. The competition was won by Cardiff who had last won the 2008-09 competition.

== Structure ==
For 2021–22, instead of a traditional league each team played each other team either home or away for a total of 11 games. League points were awarded – 4 points for a win, 2 for a draw and 0 for a loss. Teams could also earn an additional bonus point by scoring four or more tries in a match and/or losing by less than seven points. The club with the most points at the end of 11 games were declared the winners. As the previous two seasons were disrupted during the COVID-19 pandemic, there was no relegation.

== Teams ==
As the previous seasons (2019-20 & 2020-21) were cancelled due to the COVID-19 pandemic, no teams were promoted or relegated from any league. Therefore, the same 12 teams that competed in 2020-21 competed again in 2021-22.

Locations of the 2021–22 Indigo Group Premiership teams with colour markers to represent the region they belong to:

Blue = Cardiff Rugby
Orange = Dragons
Black = Ospreys
Red = Scarlets

- RGC acts as a de facto club representing North Wales

Club	Stadium	Capacity	Area
Aberavon	Talbot Athletic Ground	3,000	Port Talbot, Neath Port Talbot
Bridgend	Brewery Field	8,000	Bridgend
Cardiff	Cardiff Arms Park	12,125	Cardiff
Carmarthen Quins	Carmarthen Park	3,000	Carmarthen, Carmarthenshire
Ebbw Vale	Eugene Cross Park	8,000	Ebbw Vale, Blaenau Gwent
Llandovery	Church Bank Playing Fields	3,000	Llandovery, Carmarthenshire
Llanelli	Parc y Scarlets	14,870	Llanelli, Carmarthenshire
Merthyr	The Wern	4,500	Merthyr Tydfil
Newport	Newport Stadium	5,058	Newport
Pontypridd	Sardis Road	7,861	Pontypridd, Rhondda Cynon Taf
RGC 1404	Eirias Stadium	6,000	Colwyn Bay, Conwy
Swansea	St Helen's	4,500	Swansea

== Standings ==
2021–22 Indigo Group Premiership Table
Pos	Team	Pld	W	D	L	PF	PA	PD	TF	TA	TB	LB	Pts
1	Cardiff (C)	11	9	0	2	374	210	+164	56	29	9	1	46
2	Newport	11	9	0	2	337	214	+123	48	27	8	1	45
3	Aberavon	11	7	0	4	322	243	+79	44	32	6	3	37
4	RGC	11	6	0	5	286	244	+42	38	34	6	1	31
5	Llandovery	11	6	0	5	303	287	+16	47	38	6	1	31
6	Merthyr	11	5	0	6	329	294	+35	46	40	7	4	31
7	Pontypridd	11	7	0	4	239	259	−20	25	34	2	0	30
8	Carmarthen Quins	11	6	0	5	232	254	−22	34	30	4	2	30
9	Bridgend	11	4	0	7	186	276	−90	20	41	0	2	18
10	Swansea	11	3	0	8	212	269	−57	26	36	2	4	18
11	Ebbw Vale	11	3	0	8	157	263	−106	18	38	0	2	14
12	Llanelli	11	1	0	10	189	353	−164	27	50	4	2	10

Updated to match(es) played on unknown. Source: "Indigo Group Premiership". allwalessport.
Rules for classification: If teams are level at any stage, tiebreakers are applied in the following order:
1. Number of matches won
2. Number of tries scored
3. Ratio between points for:points against
  (C) Champion
