= Tom Farrell (rugby union) =

Ireland international rugby union player

- Born: Thomas Farrell; 1 October 1993 (age 33) Dublin, Ireland
- Height: 1.89 m (6 ft 2 1/2 in)
- Weight: 99 kg (15 st 8 lb)
- School: Castleknock College

Rugby union career
- Position: Centre
- Current team: Munster
Amateur team(s)
Years	Team	Apps	(Points)
–	Lansdowne	1	
2015	Leinster A		(0)
Senior career
Years	Team	Apps	(Points)
2016–2017	Bedford Blues	12	(10)
2017–2024	Connacht	112	(105)
2024-	Munster	38	(70)
- Correct as of 25 April 2026
International career
Years	Team	Apps	(Points)
2013	Ireland U20	4	(5)
2025-	Ireland	3	(0)
- Correct as of 5 March 2026

Tom Farrell (born 1 October 1993) is an Irish rugby union player. He primarily plays as a centre. Farrell currently plays for Irish provincial side Munster in the United Rugby Championship. He has previously played for English club Bedford Blues in the RFU Championship as well as the London Irish 'A' team, and came through the Leinster academy.

== Club career ==
=== Early career ===
Farrell joined the Leinster academy ahead of the 2013–14 season. During his time in the academy, Farrell featured for the province's second tier side, Leinster A, in the British and Irish Cup. He made a total of seven appearances for the side and scored a try against Carmarthen Quins. Farrell also played senior rugby for All-Ireland League club Lansdowne, and was named the league's "Rising Star of the Month" for March 2015. Farrell moved to London Irish in 2016 and was part of the club's A-League squad for the end of the 2015–16 season.

=== Bedford ===
In May 2016 Farrell signed with English Championship club Bedford Blues, joining them ahead of the 2016–17 season. He made his debut for the side against Jersey Reds on 11 September 2016. Farrell made 12 appearances for the Blues, with his final appearance coming against London Irish, before departing the club mid-season to return to Ireland.

=== Connacht ===
In January 2017, Farrell returned to Ireland after signing for the reigning Pro12 champions Connacht. Due to an injury crisis at centre, he immediately was added to the team's squad for the European Champions Cup.

=== Munster ===
For the 2024-25 season, Farrell made the short trip to Thomond Park to join provincial rivals Munster. He made his competitive Munster debut against his former team Connacht on the 21st September 2024 in the opening round of the 2024-25 United Rugby Championship season. He scored his first try for Munster in the province's 3rd round of the URC fixture against Ospreys, helping them to a 23-0 victory over the Welsh side.

He made a try scoring Champions Cup debut in Thomond Park against Parisian side Stade Francais in their first pool match of the Champions cup, helping Munster to a 33-7 victory.

== International career ==
Farrell has represented Ireland internationally at under-age level. He was part of the Ireland under-20 squad for the 2013 Junior World Championship. He played in two of the team's three pool matches, starting in the victory over Australia and scoring a try in the defeat to New Zealand. Ireland finished second in their pool and Farrell started in the side's two knockout games against France and Australia, with Ireland ultimately finishing eighth overall.

Farrell was named in the squad for the opening rounds of the 2019 Six Nations.

In October 2025 he was named in the Ireland Squad for the November Series of internationals, and made his debut against Japan on 8 November 2025.
