= Joe Westwood =

Welsh rugby union player

- Born: 10 July 2003 (age 23) Caerphilly, Wales
- Height: 193 cm (6 ft 4 in)
- Weight: 106 kg (234 lb)
- School: Coleg Gwent
- University: Cardiff Metropolitan University

Rugby union career
- Position: Centre
- Current team: Dragons
Youth career
- Blackwood RFC
Senior career
Years	Team	Apps	(Points)
2021–2022	Ebbw Vale RFC		
2023–	Newport RFC	11	(25)
2024–	Dragons	4	(0)
- Correct as of 24 March 2024
International career
Years	Team	Apps	(Points)
2022–2023	Wales U20	9	(10)
- Correct as of 24 March 2024

Joe Westwood (born 10 July 2003) is a Welsh rugby union player who plays as a centre for Dragons RFC.

== Club career ==
=== Youth and amateur rugby ===
Westwood began playing with local club Blackwood RFC. While playing for Coleg Gwent, Westwood scored a penalty, before kicking a drop goal to win the Schools and Colleges League Final. In June 2021, Westwood signed a Dragons academy contract, and was allocated to Ebbw Vale RFC for the 2021–22 Indigo Group Premiership. In 2023, Westwood made his debut for Newport RFC.

Westwood also attended Cardiff Metropolitan University, and played for their rugby team in the BUCS Super Rugby league.

=== Dragons ===
Westwood missed the first part of the season with an injury sustained while playing for Newport RFC, but made his Dragons debut on 21 January 2024 against the Sharks. Westwood made his first start on 2 March 2024 on the wing, against Ulster, before starting at centre against the Bulls.

Westwood signed a three-year contract extension with the Dragons on 2 April 2024.

== International career ==
=== Wales U20 ===
Westwood was named in the squad for the 2022 Six Nations Under 20s Championship, and made his debut against Scotland. Westwood participated in the 2022 Six Nations Summer Series, and scored a try in the final against South Africa. Due to an injury, Westwood missed the 2023 Six Nations Under 20s Championship, but returned to the squad for the 2023 World Rugby U20 Championship, scoring against Georgia.

== Personal life ==
Westwood's grandfather Keith played for Ebbw Vale and Newbridge, and featured in the Combined Abertillery and Ebbw Vale side that played New Zealand on their 1963 tour. His father Jonathan represented Wales U19 and U21, and played for Newbridge, Newport, Cardiff, and Neath. Jonathan Westwood later served as Director of Rugby for Cross Keys RFC and Commercial Director for the Dragons.
