= 2008–09 Principality Premiership =

Welsh Premier Division
- Founded
- 1995
- Nation
- Wales
- Relegation To
- WRU Division One East
- WRU Division One West
- Number of Teams
- 14
- Level on Pyramid
- Level 1
- Champions
- Cardiff RFC
- Relegated
- Bridgend Ravens
- Website
- WRU National Leagues

The 2008–09 Principality Premiership was the fourteenth Principality Premiership season and the fifth under its current format. The season began in September 2008 and ended in May 2009. Fourteen teams played each other on a home and away basis, with teams earning four points for a win, and a bonus point for scoring four or more tries in a match. The losing team may also earn a bonus point if they lose by seven points or less.

The fourteen teams competing were Aberavon RFC, Bedwas RFC, Bridgend Ravens, Cardiff RFC, Cross Keys RFC, Ebbw Vale RFC, Glamorgan Wanderers RFC, Llandovery RFC, Llanelli RFC, Neath RFC, Newport RFC, Pontypool RFC, Pontypridd RFC, Swansea RFC.

== Stadia ==
Team	Stadium
Aberavon RFC	Talbot Athletic Ground
Bedwas RFC	The Bridge Field
Bridgend Ravens	Brewery Field
Cardiff RFC	Cardiff Arms Park
Cross Keys RFC	Pandy Park
Ebbw Vale RFC	Eugene Cross Park
Glamorgan Wanderers RFC	Memorial Ground
Llandovery RFC	Church Bank Playing Fields
Llanelli RFC	Stradey Park; Parc y Scarlets
Neath RFC	The Gnoll
Newport RFC	Rodney Parade
Pontypool RFC	Pontypool Park
Pontypridd RFC	Sardis Road
Swansea RFC	St Helens Rugby and Cricket Ground

== Table ==
KEY
Champions
Qualified for British and Irish Cup
Relegated

	Team	Pld	W	D	L	PF	PA	PD	TF	TA	Try bonus	Losing bonus	Points
1	Cardiff RFC	26	20	0	6	681	509	+172	80	50	10	3	93
2	Newport RFC	26	18	0	8	746	418	+328	84	42	13	5	90
3	Aberavon RFC	26	17	0	9	691	481	+210	80	53	12	4	84
4	Llanelli RFC	26	17	0	9	614	525	+89	65	57	5	5	78
5	Pontypridd RFC	26	16	2	8	611	467	+144	76	51	6	3	77
6	Neath RFC	26	15	1	10	634	498	+136	76	47	7	7	76
7	Glamorgan Wanderers	26	13	1	12	496	565	-69	52	59	6	3	63
8	Swansea RFC	26	10	2	14	617	576	+41	69	66	6	8	58
9	Cross Keys RFC	26	9	1	16	476	679	-203	53	77	2	6	46
10	Ebbw Vale RFC	26	8	3	15	397	543	-146	41	61	1	5	44
11	Bedwas RFC	26	8	1	17	476	622	-146	53	74	2	6	42
12	Llandovery RFC	26	8	1	17	389	547	-158	35	66	0	8	42
13	Pontypool RFC	26	9	0	17	469	674	-205	48	81	2	3	41
14	Bridgend Ravens	26	7	2	17	454	647	-193	47	75	1	8	41
Correct as of 2009-05-09

== Fixtures & results ==
=== Week 1 ===
Date	Time	Home team	Score	Away team	Venue
September 6	14:30	Ebbw Vale RFC	6 - 6	Bedwas RFC	Eugene Cross Park
September 6	14:30	Llandovery RFC	8 - 20	Bridgend Ravens	Church Bank Playing Fields
September 6	14:30	Llanelli RFC	24 - 13	Glamorgan Wanderers	Stradey Park
September 6	14:30	Neath RFC (1 BP)	36 - 31	Pontypool RFC (1 BP)	The Gnoll
September 6	14:30	Swansea RFC (1 BP)	27 - 29	Aberavon RFC	St Helens Rugby and Cricket Ground

=== Week 2 ===
Date	Time	Home team	Score	Away team	Venue
September 13	14:30	Aberavon RFC (1 BP)	31 - 9	Llandovery RFC	Talbot Athletic Ground
September 13	14:30	Bedwas RFC (1 BP)	28 - 29	Glamorgan Wanderers (1 BP)	The Bridge Field
September 13	14:30	Bridgend Ravens (1 BP)	33 - 19	Ebbw Vale RFC	Brewery Field
September 13	14:30	Cross Keys RFC	22 - 21	Swansea RFC (1 BP)	Pandy Park
September 13	14:30	Newport RFC (1 BP)	30 - 3	Cardiff RFC	Rodney Parade
September 13	14:30	Pontypool RFC	26 - 42	Llanelli RFC (1 BP)	Pontypool Park
September 13	14:30	Pontypridd RFC	15 - 8	Neath RFC (1 BP)	Sardis Road

=== Week 3 ===
Date	Time	Home team	Score	Away team	Venue
September 20	14:30	Cardiff RFC (1 BP)	30 - 23	Bridgend RFC (1 BP)	Cardiff Arms Park
September 20	14:30	Ebbw Vale RFC	13 - 3	Pontypridd RFC	Eugene Cross Park
September 20	14:30	Llanelli RFC	27 - 23	Aberavon RFC (1 BP)	Stradey Park
September 20	14:30	Neath RFC (1 BP)	62 - 20	Cross Keys RFC	The Gnoll
September 20	14:30	Newport RFC (1 BP)	67 - 5	Llandovery RFC	Rodney Parade
September 20	14:30	Swansea RFC (1 BP)	23 - 15	Bedwas RFC	ST Helens Rugby and Cricket Ground
September 20	14:30	Glamorgan Wanderers (1 BP)	42 - 31	Pontypool RFC	Memorial Ground

=== Week 4 ===
Date	Time	Home team	Score	Away team	Venue
September 27	14:30	Abervon RFC (1 BP)	38 - 17	Glamorgan Wanderers	Talbot Athletic Ground
September 27	14:30	Bedwas RFC	20 - 57	Neath RFC (1 BP)	The Bridge Field
September 27	14:30	Bridgend Ravens (1 BP)	17 - 18	Newport RFC	Brewery Field
September 27	14:30	Cross Keys RFC (1 BP)	17 - 19	Ebbw Vale RFC	Pandy Park
September 27	14:30	Llanelli RFC	24 - 15	Llandovery RFC	Stradey Park
September 27	14:30	Pontypool RFC	20 - 17	Swansea RFC (1 BP)	Pontypool Park
September 27	14:30	Pontypridd RFC (1 BP)	32 - 28	Cardiff RFC (1 BP)	Sardis Road

=== Week 5 ===
Date	Time	Home team	Score	Away team	Venue
October 4	14:30	Aberavon RFC (1 BP)	28 - 0	Pontypool RFC	Talbot Athletic Ground
October 4	14:30	Ebbw Vale RFC (1 BP)	3 - 9	Newport RFC	Eugene Cross Park
October 4	14:30	Llandovery RFC (1 BP)	9 - 15	Cardiff RFC	Church Bank Playing Fields
October 4	14:30	Llanelli RFC	25 - 8	Bedwas RFC	Stradey Park
October 4	14:30	Neath RFC (1 BP)	15 - 16	Bridgend Ravens	The Gnoll
October 4	14:30	Swansea RFC	23 - 7	Pontypridd RFC	ST Helens Rugby and Cricket Ground
October 4	14:30	Glamorgan Wanderers	27 - 8	Cross Keys RFC	Memorial Ground

=== Week 6 ===
Date	Time	Home team	Score	Away team	Venue
October 11	14:30	Bedwas RFC	25 - 23	Aberavon RFC (1 BP)	The Bridge Field
October 11	14:30	Bridgend Ravens	24 - 24	Swansea RFC	Brewery Field
October 11	14:30	Cardiff RFC (1 BP)	25 - 26	Ebbw Vale RFC	Cardiff Arms Park
October 11	14:30	Cross Keys RFC (1 BP)	17 - 21	Llanelli RFC	Pandy Park
October 11	14:30	Neath RFC	29 - 19	Newport RFC	The Gnoll
October 11	14:30	Pontypool RFC	13 - 11	Llandovery RFC (1 BP)	Pontypool Park
October 11	14:30	Pontypridd RFC	25 - 5	Glamorgan Wanderers	Sardis Road

=== Week 7 ===
Date	Time	Home team	Score	Away team	Venue
October 18	14:30	Aberavon RFC (1 BP)	36 - 7	Cross Keys RFC	Talbot Athletic Ground
October 18	14:30	Llandovery RFC (1 BP)	9 - 15	Ebbw Vale RFC	Church Bank Playing Fields
October 18	14:30	Llanelli RFC (1 BP)	10 - 16	Pontypridd RFC	Stradey Park
October 18	14:30	Neath RFC (1 BP)	27 - 29	Cardiff RFC	The Gnoll
October 18	14:30	Newport RFC (1 BP)	65 - 21	Swansea RFC	Rodney Parade
October 18	14:30	Pontypool RFC	18 - 13	Bedwas RFC (1 BP)	Pontypool Park
October 18	14:30	Glamorgan Wanderers (1 BP)	30 - 12	Bridgend RFC	Memorial Ground

=== Week 8 ===
Date	Time	Home team	Score	Away team	Venue
October 25	14:30	Bedwas RFC (1 BP)	17 - 22	Llandovery RFC	The Bridge Field
October 25	14:30	Bridgend Ravens (1 BP)	18 - 25	Llanelli RFC (1 BP)	Brewery Field
October 25	14:30	Cross Keys RFC	30 - 16	Pontypool RFC	Pandy Park
October 25	14:30	Ebbw Vale RFC	29 - 10	Neath RFC	Eugene Cross Park
October 25	14:30	Pontypridd RFC	27 - 14	Aberavon RFC	Sardis Road
October 25	14:30	Swansea RFC (1 BP)	26 - 28	Cardiff RFC	ST Helens Rugby and Cricket Ground
October 25	14:30	Glamorgan Wanderers	16 - 28	Newport RFC (1 BP)	Memorial Ground

=== Week 9 ===
Date	Time	Home team	Score	Away team	Venue
November 1	14:30	Aberavon RFC (1 BP)	52 - 15	Bridgend Ravens	Talbot Athletic Ground
November 1	14:30	Bedwas RFC (1 BP)	10 - 13	Cross Keys RFC	The Bridge Field
November 1	14:30	Cardiff RFC	26 - 21	Glamorgan Wanderers (1 BP)	Cardiff Arms Park
November 1	14:30	Llandovery RFC	8 - 28	Neath RFC	Church Bank Playing Fields
November 1	14:30	Newport RFC (1 BP)	13 - 17	Llanelli RFC	Rodney Parade
November 1	14:30	Pontypool RFC	12 - 30	Pontypridd RFC	Pontypool Park
November 1	14:30	Swansea RFC	20 - 20	Ebbw Vale RFC	ST Helens Rugby and Cricket Ground
November 7	19:15	Newport RFC (1 BP)	35 - 0	Pontypridd RFC	Rodney Parade

=== Week 10 ===
Date	Time	Home team	Score	Away team	Venue
November 15	14:30	Bridgend Ravens	23 - 14	Pontypool RFC	Brewery Field
November 15	14:30	Cross Keys RFC	27 - 25	Llandovery RFC (1 BP)	Pandy Park
November 15	14:30	Ebbw Vale (1 BP)	9 - 13	Glamorgan Wanderers	Eugene Cross Park
November 15	14:30	Llanelli RFC	32 - 3	Cardiff RFC	Parc y Scarlets
November 15	14:30	Neath RFC	14 - 9	Swansea RFC (1 BP)	The Gnoll
November 15	14:30	Newport RFC (1 BP)	12 - 17	Aberavon RFC	Rodney Parade
November 15	14:30	Pontypridd RFC	23 - 14	Bedwas RFC	Sardis Road

=== Week 11 ===
Date	Time	Home team	Score	Away team	Venue
November 25	19:30	Bedwas RFC	36 - 25	Bridgend Ravens	The Bridge Field
November 25	19:30	Cross Keys RFC	0 - 60	Pontypridd RFC (1 BP)	Pandy Park
November 25	19:30	Ebbw Vale RFC	17 - 25	Llanelli RFC	Eugene Cross Park
November 25	19:30	Llandovery RFC	18 - 13	Swansea RFC (1 BP)	Church Bank Playing Fields
November 25	19:30	Newport RFC	19 - 9	Pontypool RFC	Rodney Parade
November 25	19:30	Glamorgan Wanderers	20 - 3	Neath RFC	Memorial Ground

=== Week 12 ===
Date	Time	Home team	Score	Away team	Venue
December 6	14:30	Bridgend Ravens (1 BP)	29 - 36	Cross Keys RFC (1 BP)	Brewery Field
December 6	14:30	Ebbw Vale RFC (1 BP)	11 - 14	Aberavon RFC	Eugene Cross Park
December 6	14:30	Llandovery RFC	23 - 7	Pontypridd RFC	Church Bank Playing Fields
December 6	14:30	Neath RFC	15 - 13	Llanelli RFC (1 BP)	The Gnoll
December 6	14:30	Newport RFC (1 BP)	31 - 20	Bedwas RFC	Rodney Parade
December 6	14:30	Pontypool RFC	6 - 36	Cardiff RFC (1 BP)	Pontypool Park
December 6	14:30	Swansea RFC (1 BP)	23 - 26	Glamorgan Wanderers	ST Helens Rugby and Cricket Ground

=== Week 13 ===
Date	Time	Home team	Score	Away team	Venue
December 13	14:30	Bedwas RFC	8 - 0	Ebbw Vale RFC	The Bridge Field
December 13	14:30	Bridgend Ravens	13 - 9	Llandovery RFC (1 BP)	Brewery Field
December 13	14:30	Cardiff RFC	22 - 15	Cross Keys RFC (1 BP)	Cardiff Arms Park
December 13	14:30	Pontypool RFC	18 - 33	Neath RFC (1 BP)	Pontypool Park
December 13	17:30	Aberavon RFC (1 BP)	29 - 16	Swansea RFC	Talbot Athletic Ground

=== Week 14 ===
Date	Time	Home team	Score	Away team	Venue
December 26	14:30	Aberavon RFC (1 BP)	15 - 17	Neath RFC	Talbot Athletic Ground
December 26	15:00	Llanelli RFC (1 BP)	42 - 23	Swansea RFC	Parc y Scarlets
December 27	14:30	Bedwas RFC	0 - 43	Cardiff RFC (1 BP)	The Bridge Field
December 27	14:30	Cross Keys RFC	13 - 9	Newport RFC (1 BP)	Pandy Park
December 27	14:30	Pontypool RFC (1 BP)	17 - 23	Ebbw Vale RFC	Pontypool Park
December 27	14:30	Glamorgan Wanderers (1 BP)	33 - 9	Llandovery RFC	Memorial Ground

=== Week 15 ===
Date	Time	Home team	Score	Away team	Venue
January 17	14:30	Cardiff RFC (1 BP)	36 - 26	Newport RFC	Cardiff Arms Park
January 17	14:30	Ebbw Vale RFC	19 – 19	Bridgend Ravens	Eugene Cross Park
January 17	14:30	Llandovery RFC	18 - 10	Aberavon RFC	Church Bank Playing Fields
January 17	14:30	Llanelli RFC (1 BP)	46 - 8	Pontypool RFC	Parc y Scarlets
January 17	14:30	Neath RFC	21 - 17	Pontypridd RFC (1 BP)	The Gnoll
January 17	14:30	Swansea RFC (1 BP)	39 - 3	Cross Keys RFC	ST Helens Rugby and Cricket Ground
January 17	17:30	Glamorgan Wanderers	9 - 3	Bedwas RFC (1 BP)	Memorial Ground

=== Week 16 ===
Date	Time	Home team	Score	Away team	Venue
January 31	14:30	Bedwas RFC (1 BP)	16 - 22	Llanelli RFC	The Bridge Field
January 31	14:30	Cardiff RFC	22 - 13	Llandovery RFC	Cardiff Arms Park
January 31	14:30	Cross Keys RFC (1 BP)	14 - 16	Glamorgan Wanderers	Pandy Park
January 31	14:30	Newport RFC (1 BP)	37 - 7	Ebbw Vale RFC	Rodney Parade
January 31	14:30	Pontypool RFC	17 - 48	Aberavon RFC (1 BP)	Pontypool Park
January 31	14:30	Pontypridd RFC	25 - 19	Swansea RFC (1 BP)	Sardis Road
January 31	17:30	Bridgend Ravens	11 - 29	Neath RFC (1 BP)	Brewery Field

=== Week 17 ===
Date	Time	Home team	Score	Away team	Venue
February 10	19:30	Bridgend Ravens	10 - 18	Bedwas RFC	Brewery Field
February 10	19:30	Neath RFC (1 BP)	41 - 0	Glamorgan Wanderers	The Gnoll
February 13	19:30	Cardiff RFC (1 BP)	29 - 3	Aberavon RFC	Cardiff Arms Park
February 13	19:30	Swansea RFC	22 - 21	Llandovery RFC (1 BP)	ST Helens Rugby and Cricket Ground

=== Week 18 ===
Date	Time	Home team	Score	Away team	Venue
February 28	14:30	Aberavon RFC (1 BP)	38 - 10	Bedwas RFC	Talbot Athletic Ground
February 28	14:30	Ebbw Vale RFC (1 BP)	13 - 15	Cardiff RFC	Eugene Cross Park
February 28	14:30	Llandovery RFC (1 BP)	6 - 10	Pontypool RFC	Church Bank Playing Fields
February 28	14:30	Llanelli RFC (1 BP)	20 - 25	Cross Keys RFC	Parc y Scarlets
February 28	14:30	Newport RFC (1 BP)	34 - 32	Neath RFC (1 BP)	Rodney Parade
February 28	14:30	Swansea RFC (1 BP)	39 - 3	Bridgend Ravens	St Helens Rugby and Cricket Ground
February 28	14:30	Glamorgan Wanderers	13 - 13	Pontypridd RFC	Memorial Ground

=== Week 19 ===
Postponed date	Date	Time	Home team	Score	Away team	Venue
	March 7	14:30	Bedwas RFC	33 - 14	Pontypool RFC	The Bridge Field
	March 7	14:30	Cardiff RFC	25 - 19	Neath RFC (1 BP)	Cardiff Arms Park
	March 7	14:30	Cross Keys RFC	14 - 31	Aberavon RFC (1 BP)	Pandy Park
	March 7	14:30	Ebbw Vale RFC	3 - 27	Llandovery RFC	Eugene Cross Park
	March 7	14:30	Pontypridd RFC	21 - 16	Llanelli RFC (1 BP)	Sardis Road
	March 7	14:30	Swansea RFC	18 - 29	Newport RFC (1 BP)	St Helens Rugby and Cricket Ground
	March 8	14:30	Bridgend Ravens	11 - 3	Glamorgan Wanderers	Brewery Field
February 10	March 10	19:15	Llanelli RFC (1 BP)	35 - 13	Ebbw Vale RFC	Parc y Scarlets

=== Week 20 ===
Postponed Date	Date	Time	Home team	Score	Away team	Venue
January 3	March 14	12:00	Llandovery RFC	20 - 15	Llanelli RFC (1 BP)	Church Bank Playing Fields
January 10	March 15	14:30	Pontypool RFC	16 - 31	Glamorgan Wanderers	Pontypool Park
September 6	March 17	19:15	Cross Keys RFC	18 - 27	Cardiff RFC	Pandy Park
January 3	March 19	19:15	Neath RFC (1 BP)	32 - 17	Bedwas RFC	The Gnoll
January 3	March 20	19:15	Newport RFC (1 BP)	39 - 15	Bridgend Ravens	Rodney Parade
December 13	March 20	19:15	Glamorgan Wanderers (1 BP)	14 - 20	Llanelli RFC	Memorial Ground

=== Week 21 ===
Postponed Date	Date	Time	Home team	Score	Away team	Venue
January 10	March 28	14:30	Bridgend Ravens (1 BP)	13 - 20	Cardiff RFC	Brewery Field
January 10	March 28	14:30	Pontypridd RFC (1 BP)	51 - 12	Ebbw Vale RFC	Sardis Road
February 10	March 31	19:15	Pontypool RFC	12 - 9	Newport RFC (1 BP)	Pontypool Park

=== Week 22 ===
Postponed Date	Date	Time	Home team	Score	Away team	Venue
	April 4	14:30	Aberavon RFC	22 - 17	Pontypridd RFC (1 BP)	Talbot Athletic Ground
	April 4	14:30	Cardiff RFC (1 BP)	33 - 22	Swansea RFC	Cardiff Arms Park
	April 4	14:30	Llandovery RFC	11 - 34	Bedwas RFC (1 BP)	Church Bank Playing Fields
	April 4	14:30	Neath RFC (1 BP)	15 - 20	Ebbw Vale RFC	The Gnoll
	April 4	14:30	Newport RFC (1 BP)	39 - 6	Glamorgan Wanderers	Rodney Parade
	April 4	14:30	Pontypool RFC (1 BP)	47 - 26	Cross Keys RFC	Pontypool Park
	April 5	16:00	Llanelli RFC	31 - 27	Bridgend Ravens (1 BP)	Parc y Scarlets
September 6	April 7	19:15	Pontypridd RFC	28 - 26	Newport RFC (1 BP)	Sardis Road

=== Week 23 ===
Postponed Date	Date	Time	Home team	Score	Away team	Venue
	April 10	17:15	Cardiff RFC (1 BP)	39 - 18	Bedwas RFC	Cardiff Arms Park
	April 10	17:15	Swansea RFC	31 - 23	Llanelli RFC	St Helens Rugby and Cricket Ground
	April 11	14:30	Bridgend Ravens	7 - 28	Pontypridd RFC	Brewery Field
	April 11	14:30	Ebbw Vale RFC	12 - 34	Pontypool RFC	Eugene Cross Park
	April 11	14:30	Llandovery RFC	22 - 19	Glamorgan Wanderers (1 BP)	Church Bank Playing Fields
	April 11	14:30	Newport RFC	17 - 32	Cross Keys RFC (1 BP)	Rodney Parade
	April 13	19:30	Neath RFC	19 - 10	Aberavon RFC	The Gnoll
April 18	April 14	14:30	Ebbw Vale RFC	18 - 5	Swansea RFC	Eugene Cross Park

=== Week 24 ===
Postponed Date	Date	Time	Home team	Score	Away team	Venue
	April 17	19:15	Glamorgan Wanderers	13 - 29	Cardiff RFC (1 BP)	Memorial Ground
	April 18	14:30	Cross Keys RFC	13 - 22	Bedwas RFC	Pandy Park
	April 18	14:30	Pontypridd RFC	23 - 22	Pontypool RFC (1 BP)	Sardis Road
January 10	April 18	14:30	Llandovery RFC	16 - 32	Newport RFC (1 BP)	Church Bank Playing Fields
January 3	April 21	19:15	Ebbw Vale RFC	17 - 33	Cross Keys RFC	Eugene Cross Park
December 27	April 21	19:15	Pontypridd RFC (1 BP)	42 - 13	Bridgend Ravens	Sardis Road
April 18	April 22	14:30	Llanelli RFC	10 - 36	Newport RFC	Parc y Scarlets
January 3	April 22	19:30	Glamorgan Wanderers	23 - 22	Aberavon RFC (1 BP)	Memorial Ground

=== Week 25 ===
Postponed Date	Date	Time	Home team	Score	Away team	Venue
	April 24	19:30	Swansea RFC (1 BP)	36 - 8	Neath RFC	St Helens Rugby and Cricket Ground
	April 25	14:30	Aberavon RFC	20 - 34	Newport RFC (1 BP)	Talbot Athletic Ground
	April 25	14:30	Bedwas RFC (1 BP)	41 - 27	Pontypridd RFC (1 BP)	The Bridge Field
	April 25	14:30	Cardiff RFC (1 BP)	36 - 9	Llanelli RFC	Cardiff Arms Park
	April 25	14:30	Llandovery RFC	16 - 15	Cross Keys RFC (1 BP)	Church Bank Playing Fields
	April 25	14:30	Pontypool RFC	26 - 20	Bridgend Ravens (1 BP)	Pontypool Park
	April 25	14:30	Glamorgan Wanderers (1 BP)	31 - 29	Ebbw Vale RFC (1 BP)	Memorial Ground
January 3	April 28	17:30	Cardiff RFC	27 - 22	Pontypridd RFC (1 BP)	Cardiff Arms Park
January 10	April 28	19:15	Cross Keys RFC	19 - 19	Neath RFC	Pandy Park
January 10	April 29	19:15	Aberavon RFC (1 BP)	46 - 10	Llanelli RFC	Talbot Athletic Ground
January 3	April 29	19:15	Swansea RFC	22 - 6	Pontypool RFC	ST Helens Rugby and Cricket Ground

=== Week 26 ===
Postponed Date	Date	Time	Home team	Score	Away team	Venue
	May 2	14:30	Aberavon RFC (1 BP)	32 - 24	Ebbw Vale RFC (1 BP)	Talbot Athletic Ground
	May 2	14:30	Bedwas RFC	22 - 33	Newport RFC	The Bridge Field
	May 2	14:30	Cardiff RFC	15 - 32	Pontypool RFC (1 BP)	Cardiff Arms Park
	May 2	14:30	Cross Keys RFC (1 BP)	18 - 21	Bridgend Ravens	Pandy Park
	May 2	14:30	Llanelli RFC	30 - 25	Neath RFC (1 BP)	Parc y Scarlets
	May 2	14:30	Pontypridd RFC	22 - 22	Llandovery RFC	Sardis Road
	May 2	14:30	Glamorgan Wanderers (1 BP)	26 - 42	Swansea RFC (1 BP)	Memorial Ground
April 18	May 4	14:30	Neath RFC	20 - 17	Llandovery RFC (1 BP)	The Gnoll
April 18	May 5	14:30	Bridgend Ravens (1 BP)	16 - 19	Aberavon RFC	Brewery Field

=== Week 27 ===
Postponed date	Date	Time	Home team	Score	Away team	Venue
November 25	May 8	19:15	Aberavon RFC (1 BP)	41 - 40	Cardiff RFC (2 BP)	Talbot Athletic Ground
January 10	May 8	19:15	Bedwas RFC	22 - 36	Swansea RFC (1 BP)	The Bridge Field
February 10	May 8	19:15	Pontypridd RFC (1 BP)	30 - 21	Cross Keys RFC	Sardis Road
