= Henco van Wyk =

South African rugby union player

- Full name: Henco van Wyk
- Born: 7 May 2001 (age 25) Rustenburg, South Africa
- Height: 1.81 m (5 ft 11 in)
- Weight: 92 kg (203 lb)
- School: Hoërskool Monument
- University: University of Witwatersrand

Rugby union career
- Position: Centre
- Current team: Lions / Golden Lions
Senior career
Years	Team	Apps	(Points)
2021–	Golden Lions	10	(30)
2022–	Lions	65	(125)
- Correct as of 3 November 2026
International career
Years	Team	Apps	(Points)
2019	South Africa U20	0	(0)

Henco van Wyk (born 7 May 2001) is a South African professional rugby union player for the Golden Lions in the Currie Cup and Lions in the United Rugby Championship. His regular position is outside centre. He was selected for the SA Schools Team in 2019.

Van Wyk was named in the Golden Lions squad for the 2021 Currie Cup Premier Division. He made his debut for the Golden Lions in Round 10 of the 2021 Currie Cup Premier Division against the Free State Cheetahs.

Henco van Wyk was named the Junior Springbok Player of the Year as he was a star for the national U20 side during their international series in 2021. He made his debut for the Lions in the United Rugby Championship against Edinburgh in April 2022.

In addition to his on-field prowess, Van Wyk has earned the nickname "Weapon X", a nod to the Marvel character Wolverine and an homage to American football player Brian Dawkins, known for his relentless aggression and similar playing style.

== High school career ==
In 2019, during his final year at Monument High School, Henco van Wyk emerged as one of the most dominant high school rugby players in South Africa. As captain of the school's rugby team, he garnered numerous accolades, reflecting his talents on the field. Van Wyk was recognized for playing the most matches for the school's first team, totaling 41 matches, and was named Sevens Player of the Year. He also received awards for scoring the most tries for the first team, with 18 tries, and was honored as the Most Valuable Player, Rugby Player of the Year, and Sports Boy of the Year.

That same year, he was selected for the SA U18 Sevens team that won the Capricorn International Sevens Tournament in Namibia. At the end of the year, he was also won an award for High School Rugby Player of the Year in South Africa.

== Professional career ==
=== Junior Springboks ===
==== 2021 ====
In 2021, van Wyk was selected for the South African U20 team (the Junior Springboks) for the International U20 series, where South Africa competed against Argentina, Georgia, and Uruguay. The Junior Springboks won the series, with van Wyk playing a pivotal role and being named the Junior Springbok Player of the Year.

=== Lions ===
==== 2021 ====
Van Wyk was named in the Golden Lions squad for the 2021 Currie Cup Premier Division. He made his debut for the Golden Lions in Round 10 of the 2021 Currie Cup Premier Division against the Free State Cheetahs.

==== 2022 ====
He made his debut for the Lions in the United Rugby Championship against Edinburgh in April 2022, coming off the bench. Van Wyk's starting debut for the Lions came in their last game of the 2021/2022 season against Dragons RFC.

By the beginning of the 2022/2023 season, van Wyk had become a regular starter for the Lions, featuring in their opening match against the Bulls in September 2022. His performances during the Lions' away tour, which included wins against Cardiff and Edinburgh, solidified his reputation as a rising star. Former Springbok Bakkies Botha praised van Wyk on Twitter, and he quickly became a fan favorite.

His strong performances led to a call-up for the South African "A" team at the end of the year, coached by Mzwandile Stick.

Unfortunately, van Wyk's year ended on a sour note as he was sidelined with an elbow injury sustained in a match against Stade Français Paris in the Challenge Cup. The injury was a significant setback to his aspirations of making the South African World Cup squad in 2023.
