= 2025 U20 Rugby Championship =

International Rugby Championship

Tournament details
- Host: South Africa
- Date: 1–11 May 2025
- Countries: Argentina; Australia; New Zealand; South Africa

Final positions
- Champions: New Zealand (2nd title)

Tournament statistics
- Matches played: 6
- Tries scored: 65 (10.83 per match)
- Top scorer(s): Maloni Kunawave (30)
- Most tries: Maloni Kunawave (6)

The 2025 U20 Rugby Championship, also known as 2025 TRC U20, was the second edition of the rugby union competition, the U20 Rugby Championship, the under-20 equivalent of The Rugby Championship, played by senior men's teams of Argentina, Australia, New Zealand, and South Africa. The tournament dates and venue were announced in April 2025, being hosted by South Africa, with every match being played at the Nelson Mandela Bay Stadium in Gqeberha (formerly called Port Elizabeth), Eastern Cape.

New Zealand were the defending champions. On 11 May 2025, New Zealand defended their title, defeating the hosts South Africa in a close match, 45–48. Before the final match, Australia's 40–36 win against Argentina earlier in the day jumped them up into first place.

== Venue ==
The venue was confirmed in April 2025, a month prior to the tournaments scheduled start date.

North End (Gqeberha)
Nelson Mandela Bay Stadium
Capacity: 46,000
2025 U20 Rugby Championship is located in Eastern Cape
2025 U20 Rugby Championship is located in South Africa

== Table ==
Pos	Team	Pld	W	D	L	PF	PA	PD	TF	TA	TB	LB	Pts
1	New Zealand (C)	3	2	1	0	152	95	+57	24	15	1	0	11
2	Australia	3	2	1	0	98	89	+9	15	13	0	0	10
3	South Africa (H)	3	1	0	2	105	102	+3	15	15	0	2	6
4	Argentina	3	0	0	3	82	151	−69	11	22	0	1	1

Source: All Rugby
(C) Champion; (H) Host

== Fixtures ==
Fixtures were announced alongside the tournament venue and dates (April 2025).

=== Round 1 ===
1 May
14:00 SAST (UTC+02)

New Zealand	29–29	Australia
Try: Saunoa 4' m Solomon 33' m Kunawave (2) 45' m, 48' c Penalty try 59'; Con: Solomon (1/4) 49'; Cards: Oudenryn (yellow card) 82'	Report	Try: Grover (2) 8' m, 38' m Harvey 27' c King 61' m Morrison 82' c Con: Harvey (2/5) 28', 83'; Cards: Mangelsdorf (yellow card) 59' to 69'; Fowler (yellow card) 43' to 53'; Martens (yellow card) 65' to 75'

Nelson Mandela Bay Stadium
Referee: Christopher Allison (South Africa)

1 May
16:10 SAST (UTC+02)

South Africa	36–25	Argentina
Try: Pead (2) 15' c, 47' c Erasmus 23' m Norton 52' c Cupido 60' c Con: Smith (3/4) 16' 48' 52'; Moyo 61' (1/1); Pen: Smith (1/1) 5'	Report	Try: Senillosa 18' c Lescano 35' c Ledesma 41' m Con: Benedit (2/3) 19', 36'; Pen: Benedit (2/2) 11', 27'

Nelson Mandela Bay Stadium
Referee: Todd Petrie (New Zealand)

=== Round 2 ===
6 May
14:00 SAST (UTC+02)

(1 BP) New Zealand	75–21	Argentina
Try: Kunawave (2) 8' c, 29' m Bason (2) 16' c, 27' c Tengblad 22' c Woodley 38' c Oudenryn 41' c Ahloo 64' c Lewai (2) 66' c, 73' c Maisiri 76' c Con: Cole (8/9) 9', 17', 23', 28', 39', 42', 65', 67'; Simpson (2/2) 74', 76'	Report	Try: Arrieta 11' c Cambiasso 34' c Ignacio Carrera 49' c Con: Arrieta (3/3) 12', 36', 50'

Nelson Mandela Bay Stadium
Referee: George Myers (Australia)

6 May
16:10 SAST (UTC+02)

(1 BP) South Africa	24–29	Australia
Try: Nyali 2' c Ndlozi 27' c Hlekani 78' c Con: Moyo (2/2) 3', 28'; Smith (1/1) 78'; Pen: Moyo (1/1) 42'	Report	Try: Doyle 46' c Langi 59' c Ata 62' c Rubens 69' m Con: Harvey (3/4) 47', 60', 63'; Pen: Doyle (1/1) 75'; Cards: King (yellow card) 33' to 43'

Nelson Mandela Bay Stadium
Referee: Thomas Bertazza (Argentina)

=== Round 3 ===
11 May
14:00 SAST (UTC+02)

(1 BP) Argentina	36–40	Australia
Try: Vieyra (2) 14' m, 56' c Pnealty try 25'; García Campos 37' c Ledesma Arocena 82' c Con: Benedit (3/4) 38', 57', 82'; Drop: Senillosa (1/1) 42'; Cards: Storey (yellow card) 18' to 28'; Benítez (yellow card) 73'	Report	Try: Martens 3' c Rubens 11' m Brial 21' c Wilcox 49' c Ata 64' c Penalty try 73'; Con: Harvey (4/5) 4', 22', 50', 65'; Cards: Dillon (yellow card) 25' to 35'

Nelson Mandela Bay Stadium
Referee: Christopher Allison (South Africa)

11 May
16:10 SAST (UTC+02)

(1 BP) South Africa	45–48	New Zealand
Try: Bester 2' m Ngobese 6' c Mnebelele 12' c Cupido 28' c Mlaba (2) 48' m, 55' c Penalty try 75'; Con: Moyo (4/6) 7', 13', 29', 56'	Report	Try: Saunoa (3) 17' m, 25' c, 40' c Letiu 32' m Kunawave (2) 42' c, 60' m Pole 45' c Solomon 51' m Con: Cole (4/8) 26', 41', 43', 47'; Cards: Woodley (red card); Baker (yellow card) 75'

Nelson Mandela Bay Stadium
Attendance: 14,835
Referee: Thomas Bertazza (Argentina)

== Statistics ==
As of 11 May 2025.

=== Points scorers ===
Pos.	Name	Team	Pts.
1	Maloni Kunawave	New Zealand	30
2	Sid Harvey	Australia	26
3	Will Cole	New Zealand	24
4	Harlyn Saunoa	New Zealand	20
5	Vusi Moyo	South Africa	17
6	Rafael Benedit	Argentina	16
7	Stanley Solomon	New Zealand	12
8	Martiniano Arrieta	Argentina	11
8	Kyle Smith	South Africa	11
10	Xavier Rubens	Australia	10

=== Try scorers ===
Pos.	Name	Team	Tries
1	Maloni Kunawave	New Zealand	6
2	Harlyn Saunoa	New Zealand	4
3	Multiple players		2

== See also ==
- 2025 World Rugby U20 Championship
- 2025 Six Nations U20 Championship
