= Shane Whereat =

Australian rugby league footballer

Personal information
- Born: 10 June 1970 (age 56) Sydney, New South Wales, Australia
- Height: 180 cm (5 ft 11 in)
- Weight: 84 kg (13 st 3 lb)

Playing information
- Position: Wing
Club
Years	Team	Pld	T	G	FG	P
1993–96	Eastern Suburbs	35	12	0	0	48
1997–99	Parramatta Eels	38	25	0	0	100
	Total	73	37	0	0	148

Shane Whereat (born 10 June 1970) is an Australian former professional rugby league footballer who played in the 1990s. His outstanding speed saw him mostly play on the Wing.

== Playing career ==
A former junior rugby union player, Whereat switched to rugby league in 1993 and made his first grade debut on the bench for Eastern Suburbs in round 10 of the 1993 NSWRL season against the Penrith Panthers at Penrith Stadium. He went on to play 10 games and scored 4 tries in his debut season.

A noted speedster, Whereat took place in the Rugby League Sprint race held during the Botany Bay Gift in March 1993. Over 75 meters, Whereat finished in fourth place behind winner Brett Dallas, second placed John Minto, and third placed Lee Oudenryn. Despite losing this race, Whereat gained a reputation as one of the fastest ever players in rugby league.

After spending four seasons with the Roosters where he scored 12 tries in 35 games, he signed to play with the Parramatta Eels for the 1997 season. In the 1998 season, Whereat scored 2 tries in his side's 32–20 preliminary final loss to Canterbury-Bankstown at the Sydney Football Stadium. With less than 10 minutes to go in the game, Parramatta were winning the match 18–2 and looked certain to qualify for their first grand final since 1986. Canterbury then scored 3 tries in quick succession to take the game into extra-time and ultimately win the match. The game has been described as one of the biggest comebacks in the history of the game.

After spending three seasons with the Parramatta Eels, Whereat retired at the end of the 1999 season. He finished his stint with the Eels scoring 25 tries in 38 games.
