= Waihi College =

Location
- Kensington Road, Waihi; 37.386313°S 175.831965°E

Information
- Type: State, Co-educational, Secondary
- Motto: Latin: Lex Nostra Fides English: Our Faith Is The Law or Duty Is Our Watchword
- Established: 1932; 94 years ago
- Ministry of Education Institution no.: 114
- Principal: Mrs Briar Carden-Scott
- Years: 7–13
- Enrolment: 552 (July 2026)
- Color: Maroon
- Socio-economic decile: 4J
- Website: http://www.waihicol.school.nz

Waihi College is a co-educational secondary school located in the North Island town of Waihi in New Zealand. The school motto reads in Latin 'Lex Nostra Fides' translated into English as 'Our Faith Is The Law'. It was established as a District High School in 1932. It then became a Forms 3–7 College in 1954. It moved to its current site in 1959. In 1976 it extended its roll to cover forms 1 and 2. Forms 1–7 are now known as years 7–13. Today Waihi College houses nearly 750 students during a school Calendar.

== History ==
Teaching at secondary level in Waihi commenced in 1901 when Waihi School became Waihi District High School. This was on the site where the South School now is and it burned down in 1931. The rebuilt school was opened as Waihi Intermediate with a secondary department attached. The principal was Mr F R Slevin, a former Waihi student. Mr D E Swinton became principal in 1947 and, in 1953, after strong representation to the Minister of Education, Waihi College was established as a full secondary school, with an intermediate department attached. The Waihi College Board of Governors was established in 1957 and in 1958 work commenced on the site where the present college is situated. Staff and pupils moved to the new buildings in September 1959 and the college was officially opened on 11 March 1960 by the then Prime Minister, Walter Nash. The intermediate school remained at Moresby Avenue and sixteen years later Forms 1 and 2 students returned to the college roll.

== Crest and Motto ==
The motto enshrined into the emblem reads in Latin 'Lex Nostra Fides' meaning Our Faith Is The Law. The motto suggests an implicit ethos expected of students to strive for greatness whilst respecting duties carried under the eternal, the natural, the human and the divine law. Regardless of a students background, creed, person attribute or social status, every student can achieve civic character by understanding what the motto speaks of and the truth in its message.

== Houses ==
The house system of Waihi College places students into one of four houses. This system is used for events such as Spirit Days and Athletic.

Waihi College Houses:
| Dominion | Empire | Royal | Amaranth |

== Academics ==
The school teaches National Certificate of Educational Achievement accredited papers, including but not limited to classical studies, history, music, chemistry, biology, physics, English studies, geography, physical education, Māori language, food technology, agriculture, graphic design, horticulture and mathematics.

== Sports ==
The school prides itself on two main sports; Basketball and Football. The school has a rich rivalry with Katikati College. The two schools have an annual exchange, including Rugby union, Netball and Basketball. Katikati College is located about 25 km from Waihi College, so students take buses for transport.

The school has three artificial turf spaces along with a large upper field, with three pitches complete with goals for various sports.
