= Xavier Saifoloi =

New Zealand rugby union player

- Full name: Xavier E. Saifoloi
- Born: 23 June 2003 (age 23) Melbourne, Australia
- Height: 195 cm (6 ft 5 in)
- Weight: 114 kg (251 lb; 17 st 13 lb)
- School: Botany Downs Secondary College

Rugby union career
- Position(s): Flanker, Number 8
- Current team: Crusaders, Waikato
Senior career
| Years | Team | Apps | (Points) |
| 2023– | Waikato | 14 | (55) |
| 2025– | Crusaders | 2 | (15) |
- Correct as of 10 December 2024

Xavier Saifoloi (born 23 June 2003) is a New Zealand rugby union player, who currently plays as a flanker or number 8 for the Crusaders in Super Rugby and Waikato in New Zealand's National Provincial Championship.

== Early career ==
Saifoloi attended Botany Downs Secondary College in East Auckland from where he earned selection for the Blues U18 squad. He moved to the Waikato region after leaving school, where he played club rugby for University.

== Senior career ==
Although he wasn't named in the Waikato squad for the 2023 Bunnings NPC season, Saifoloi made his National Provincial Championship debut for the province on 16 August 2023 against Hawke's Bay. The following year, he was named in the squad for the 2024 Bunnings NPC.

On 12 November 2024, Saifoloi was named in the Crusaders squad for the 2025 Super Rugby Pacific season.
