= Sid Harvey =

Australian rugby union player (born 2005)

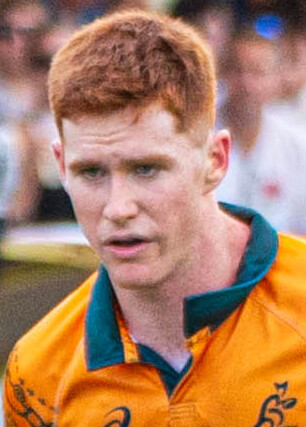
- Harvey in 2025
- Born: 7 October 2005 (age 21) Narrabri, New South Wales, Australia
- Height: 191 cm (6 ft 3 in)
- School: Narrabri High School
- University: University of New South Wales

Rugby union career
- Position(s): Wing, Fullback
- Current team: Waratahs, Eastern Suburbs
Youth career
- 2011–2024: Narrabri Blue Boars
- 2023–2025: Waratahs Academy
- 2024–2025: Eastern Suburbs
Amateur team(s)
| Years | Team | Apps | (Points) |
| 2025– | Eastern Suburbs | 3 | (5) |
- Correct as of 16 August 2025
Senior career
| Years | Team | Apps | (Points) |
| 2026– | Waratahs | 11 | (98) |
- Correct as of 27 May 2026
International career
| Years | Team | Apps | (Points) |
| 2025 | Australia U20 | 8 | (51) |
- Correct as of 19 July 2025
National sevens team
| Years | Team | | Comps |
| 2024–2025 | Australia | | 6 |
- Correct as of 6 April 2025

Sidney Harvey (born 7 October 2005) is an Australian rugby union player who plays as a wing for the New South Wales Waratahs in the Super Rugby.

== Junior career ==
Born and raised in Narrabri, New South Wales, Harvey played junior rugby for the Narrabri Blue Boars in the Central North Rugby Union while being educated at Narrabri High School. In 2021 Harvey represented the NSW Country under-16s team at the 2021 NSW Country Junior Rugby Union Championships.

In 2023 Harvey was selected for the NSW Combined High Schools Sports Association (NSWCHSSA) under-18s after guiding his team, North West, to a third-place finish and being named player of the tournament at the NSWCHSSA under-18s state carnival. Two months later Harvey played for the "NSW Waratahs White", more commonly known as "NSW II" against the "Queensland Reds Grey" ("QLD II") in an under-18s academy match at Ballymore Stadium. Harvey kicked a penalty goal to win the match 26–25. By December Harvey was called-up to the Australian youth sevens squad ahead of the Global Youth Sevens (GYS) hosted in Auckland, New Zealand.

Having represented the Waratahs U18s and U19s throughout 2023 and 2024, Harvey began playing for the Eastern Suburbs in Sydney's Shute Shield competition, representing their colts side (under-21s) for 2024. He set a new club record for the most points scored by a single player in a match with 51, which included five tries and 13 conversions against the Hunter Wildfires.

Alongside his junior rugby career, Harvey was also an all-rounder in cricket in the first XI of Tatts Cricket Club in Narrabri. He was selected for various New South Wales state teams in junior cricket, most notably the ACT/NSW Country team at the under-17s national championships in 2023.

Since 2024 Harvey has been enrolled at the University of New South Wales (UNSW), studying a Bachelor of Science and Education and resides at Baxter College.

== Career ==
=== Waratahs ===
Harvey was named in the Waratahs' squad for the inaugural 2025 Super Rugby AUS competition, a short-format, domestic rugby union competition featuring Australia's four Super Rugby franchises. Harvey started on the left wing for the Waratahs in the first round defeat to the Force. In the second round derby against rivals the Queensland Reds, Harvey was once again named the starting left wing. The match took place in his hometown of Narrabri in the annual "Santos Festival of Rugby". Harvey kicked six conversion goals, four of which followed a Jimmy Hendren try. The Waratahs won 47–19.

In November 2025, Harvey had graduated from the Waratahs Academy and promoted to the senior Waratahs squad ahead of their 2026 season. In March 2026, Harvey was named on the bench of the Waratahs' Round 4 clash against the Hurricanes at the Sydney Football Stadium. Harvey made his debut, being substituted in the 59th minute for fullback Andrew Kellaway. Although Harvey scored one conversion goal, the Waratahs lost 19–59, their second-biggest defeat at home by margin and by points conceded.

Harvey started every in every Waratahs match post-round four, initially at left-wing before being moved permanently to fullback. In round seven, Harvey scored fifteen points from the boot against the Brumbies at Canberra Stadium, including a 74th minute penalty goal, to seal an upset win in their Dan Vickerman Cup clash. Following the round, Harvey had established a clear lead in the Super Rugby's Rookie of the Year award tally for 2026 after being equal first the previous round with Moana Pasifika's Joel Lam. By round ten Harvey's lead had increased to ten points, with the closest competitor being the Highlanders' Nic Shearer.

It was revealed in early April 2026 that Harvey had extended his contract with the Waratahs, signing a new two-year deal with the side to stay until the end of the 2028 season. In June 2026, Harvey was announced as the Super Rugby's Rookie of the Year for the 2026 season, the first player to take the honour. Harvey won the award on 27 votes, beating out the Highlanders' Lucas Casey on 18.

== International career ==
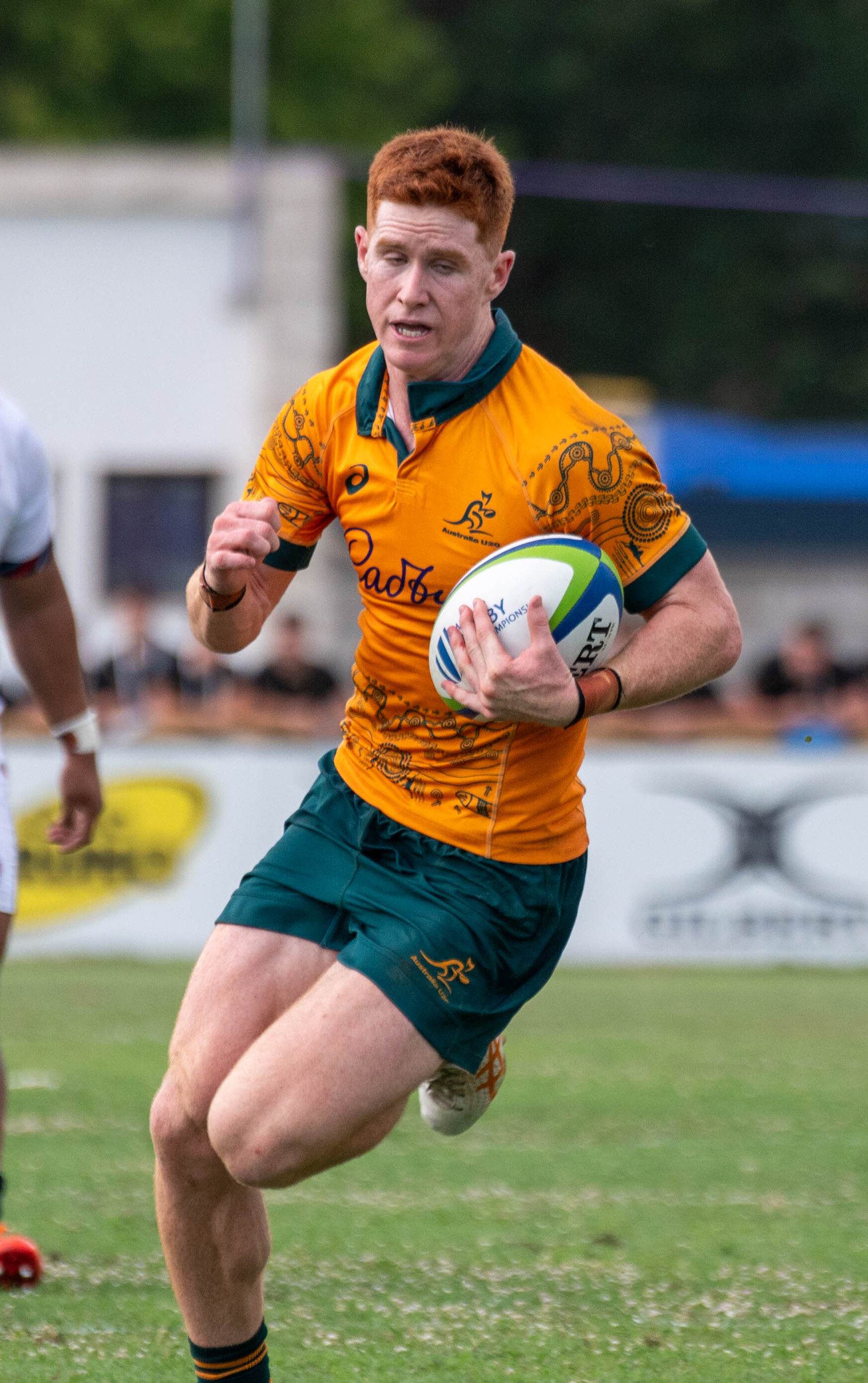
Harvey with Australia U20s at the 2025 U20 Rugby Championship.

In November 2024 Harvey made his international debut for the Australian sevens team in Dubai on the first leg of the 2024–25 Sevens Series. Harvey went on to play in five of the remaining six events, playing an overall nineteen matches and scoring four tries.

After finishing international duty with the Australia sevens team (January–April 2025), Harvey was thrust into the Australia under-20s team in May for the 2025 U20 Rugby Championship hosted at Nelson Mandela Bay Stadium in Gqeberha, South Africa. Harvey initially started on the left wing, scoring one try and two conversions in a 29-all draw against New Zealand.

Harvey was moved to the fullback position in the next two matches where he scored a combined 17 points, all coming from the boot. Australia under-20s finished runner-up behind New Zealand.

The following month Harvey's move to fullback was made permanent as he started in every match of Australia's 2025 World Rugby U20 Championship campaign at 15. Harvey scored the teams first try of the opening match against South Africa which finished in a 17–73 defeat. After a ten-point victory over Scotland in the following round, Harvey was relieved of his kicking duties in the final pool match. Harvey scored his second try of the tournament in Australia's final match against England for fifth place. Australia won 68–40.

== Career statistics ==
=== Club ===
As of 10 September 2026.

Statistics by club, season and competition
| Club | Season | League | | | | | | |
| Club | Season | Division | Apps | Tries | Con. | Pen. | Drop | Points |
|---|---|---|---|---|---|---|---|---|
| Waratahs | 2026 | Super Rugby Pacific | 11 | 6 | 22 | 8 | 0 | 98 |
| Waratahs | 2027 | Super Rugby Pacific | TBD | | | | | |
| Waratahs | Total | | 11 | 6 | 22 | 8 | 0 | 98 |

== Awards and honours ==
Individual

- Super Rugby Pacific Rookie of the Year: 2026
