= Ernest Hoben =

Ernest Denis Hoben
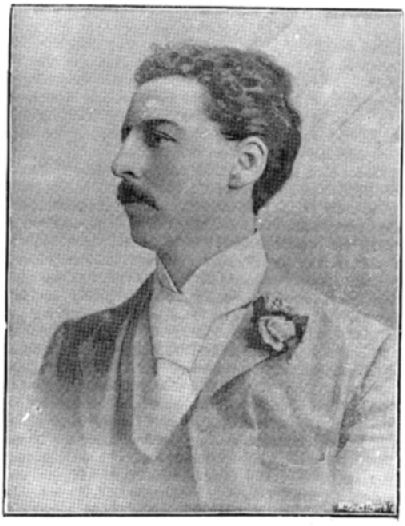
- Profile of Ernest Denis Hoben c. 1897
- Born: 3 February 1864; Auckland, New Zealand
- Died: 3 February 1918 (aged 54); Melbourne, Australia

Ernest Denis Hoben (3 February 1864 – 3 February 1918) was a New Zealand rugby union administrator who was the figure most responsible for the founding of the New Zealand Rugby Football Union in 1892; he was subsequently elected its first Honorary Secretary.

== Journalism and personal life ==
Hoben was born in Auckland, and after a few years in New South Wales, he spent his youth at Tauranga, where he was a prominent figure in local sports as captain of the rugby and boxing clubs, and noted as a walker and swimmer. After working at a bank in Tauranga, he started working in journalism, and subsequently moved to Wellington, where he worked for The Evening Post. During his career he worked for a number of newspapers throughout New Zealand and Australia, including The Sydney Daily Telegraph, The Sydney Mail, The New Zealand Times and the Manawatu Times. Hoben had just moved to Melbourne to take up a position at The Melbourne Herald, but he was hospitalised soon after his arrival, and died of a diabetes-related illness there.

== Rugby union ==
Hoben was involved in rugby first in the Bay of Plenty and then in the Hawke's Bay. He helped establish the sport in the Bay of Plenty, and became friends with Joe Warbrick and his family; Warbrick went on to organise and captain the ground-breaking 1888–89 New Zealand Native football team. Hoben later served as secretary of the Hawke's Bay Rugby Union. By 1891 clubs in a number of regions throughout New Zealand had formed their own provincial Rugby Unions to govern the sport in their area. This started with the formation of the Canterbury Rugby Football Union (CRFU) and Wellington Rugby Football Union in 1879, and over the next decade over a dozen new provincial Unions were formed. Most of the provincial Unions were directly affiliated with the English Rugby Football Union, but having a governing body in New Zealand would help with inter-provincial disputes over scoring and other matters.

At various times the Canterbury, Wellington, and Auckland Rugby Union's had each suggested the formation of a national union, but Hoben became the primary advocate for such a body, and spent 1891 travelling throughout the country and canvassing support from the various provincial unions. Hoben found widespread support for his proposal, with the Otago Rugby Union (ORU) – a powerful province in the game – the only significant opponent to the idea. On 7 November 1891 a conference with delegates from Auckland, Taranaki, Hawke's Bay, Wairarapa, Manawatu, Wellington and Otago met and discussed the text of a constitution. The draft constitution was distributed to the various provincial Unions to discuss, and by the time of a second meeting, at the Club Hotel in Wellington on 16 April 1892, most of the Unions endorsed a proposal to form the New Zealand Rugby Football Union (now the New Zealand Rugby Union, or NZRU). Hoben was elected secretary. Most notably, the three most powerful South Island Unions of Canterbury, Otago, and Southland declined to join. On the subject of those southern Unions not joining, Hoben said:

If they would not come it was their loss, but others could not stand still on their account. A Union which would include the vast majority of the Unions of the Colony was fully justified in calling itself the New Zealand Union, and the justification would be enhanced when the others came in, as they ultimately would. The New Zealand Union would be formed with them if they could, but without them if they must.

— Ernest Hoben

Hoben was particularly surprised that Canterbury did not join as the CRFU management committee had previously voted to do so in 1891, but none of those that had voted in favour were re-elected for 1892. The CRFU were unhappy with the requirement that all NZRU executive committee members live in Wellington, something they felt would put New Zealand rugby "in the hands of Wellington men". Consequently, the 1893 New Zealand team that toured New South Wales was selected without any players from the three southern provinces. But by 1895 all three Unions had joined the NZRU and the 1897 New Zealand team that toured Australia was selected from players throughout the country.

The NZRU's largest meeting room, the Ernest Hoben Room, is named in recognition of his services to rugby in New Zealand. The room's walls are decorated with photos of past All Black players and teams, as well as all 26 provincial rugby jerseys. As part of their 150th anniversary in 2013, The New Zealand Herald named Hoben as the most influential New Zealander of 1892 for his role in helping found the NZRU.

== Sources ==
This article incorporates text available under the CC BY-SA 3.0 license.

- "Sports, Games, and Pastimes". The Cyclopedia of New Zealand [Wellington Provincial District]. Wellington: Cyclopedia Company Limited. 1897. pp. 424–425.
- "New Zealand Rugby Union Celebrates 120 Years". allblacks.com. 16 April 2012. Archived from the original on 5 December 2017.
- "How Hoben Died". NZ Truth. 23 February 1918. p. 6.
- "Obituary: Ernest Denis Hoben". Ashburton Guardian. 5 February 1918. p. 3.
- "Football. Rugby". Auckland Star. 16 February 1918. p. 14.
- "1892, Ernest Hoben: Rugby visionary". The New Zealand Herald. 2013.
- McCarthy, Winston (1968). Haka! The All Blacks Story. London: Pelham Books.
- "Regional Rugby – Overview". Ministry for Culture and Heritage. 20 December 2012.
- Gifford, Phil (2004). The Passion – The Stories Behind 125 years of Canterbury Rugby. Wilson Scott Publishing. ISBN 0-9582535-1-X.
