= Botany Downs Secondary College =

School in Auckland, New Zealand

Botany Downs Secondary College (BDSC)

Location
- 575 Chapel Road, East Tamaki, Auckland, New Zealand; 36.934370°S 174.915984°E

Information
- Funding type: State (not integrated)
- Motto: "Knowledge with Character"
- Opened: January 2004
- Ministry of Education Institution no.: 6930
- Principal: Karen Brinsden
- Years offered: 9–13
- Gender: Coeducational
- Enrolment: 1,994 (July 2026)
- Socio-economic decile: 9Q
- Website: www.bdsc.school.nz

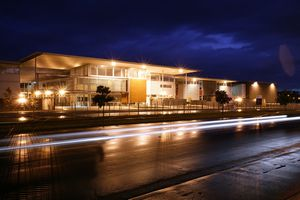
Botany Downs Secondary College at night

Botany Downs Secondary College is a state coeducational secondary school located in East Tamaki, a suburb of Auckland, New Zealand. The school opened in 2004 as a result of new residential development in the eastern Auckland area. Serving Years 9 to 13, the school has a roll of approximately 1,994 students.

== History ==
Botany Downs Secondary College was announced with a notice published in the New Zealand Gazette by Education Minister Trevor Mallard on 12 November 2001, with the working name Howick South Secondary School. The school opened in January 2004, initially taking Year 9 students only. The remaining school years opened as the 2004 Year 9 students moved through, with the school fully opening at the beginning of 2008.

== Logo ==
- The inner circle represents the student.
- The outer circle represents the nurturing and educating by the teacher.
- The overlapping circles echo the traditional role of the educator and the student.
- The outer shape links the circles, envelops the whole school community and is pointing towards the future.

== Whanau system ==
When BDSC was built, the overarching architectural and educational theme chosen for the campus was exploration and journey. The name were specifically chosen to reflect New Zealand's rich maritime history, voyaging, and the pursuit of new knowledge. They also selected iconic New Zealanders who represent the school's values.

When admission is finalized, students are placed in one of the six whanau. The selection is random unless the student has a sibling as a current or former student, the student will be placed in the same whanau unless stated otherwise. The Whanau House system at BDSC splits the school into "schools within a school", with two tutor classes of each year level in every whanau, with occasional additions of new tutor classes in different year levels based on roll numbers.

Name	House Values and Philosophies	Whanau Symbol	House colour	Whanau Leader
Blake	Go beyond your horizons.	Kiwi	Red	Mr A Taylor
Endeavour	Voyagers, innovators, travellers and journeys.	Bee	Yellow	Mrs F Herbert
Discovery	It is not my strength alone but the strength of many that contribute to my success.	Pukeko	Blue	Ms N Folks
Spirit	A free spirit and drive to move ahead and fly high.	Dragon	Purple	Mrs M Killip
Britten	Innovation through motivation, perseverance and hard work.	The Britten V1000 Motorcycle	Black	Ms W Pretorius
Koru	Reaching towards the light and striving for perfection.	Koru	Green	Mr B Euden

== Enrolment ==
In the 2023 Census, 54.5% of students ethnically identified as Asian, and 35.5% as European/Pākehā. Other major ethnic groups include Pacific (8.2%), Māori (5.5%), Middle Eastern, Latin American, African (MELAA) (4.8%), and other (0.8%). International students were included but separated, with 4.3% of students having been affiliated with an international status. The roll data presented is based on roll returns from the Ministry of Education as of 1 July 2023, reporting over 1,734 students, including domestic students who are affiliated with a single or multiple ethnic groups and international students.

As of July 2026, Botany Downs Secondary College has a roll of 1,994 students, of which 77 (3.9%) identify as Māori.

As of 2026, the school has an Equity Index of 403, placing it amongst schools whose students have few socioeconomic barriers to achievement (roughly equivalent to deciles 8 and 9 under the former socio-economic decile system).

== Notable alumni ==
- Tafito Lafaele – rugby union player
- Ben Nee-Nee – rugby union player
- Harlyn Saunoa – rugby union player
- Tone Ng Shiu – rugby union player
- Xavier Saifoloi – rugby union player
