= James Martens =

Australian rugby union player

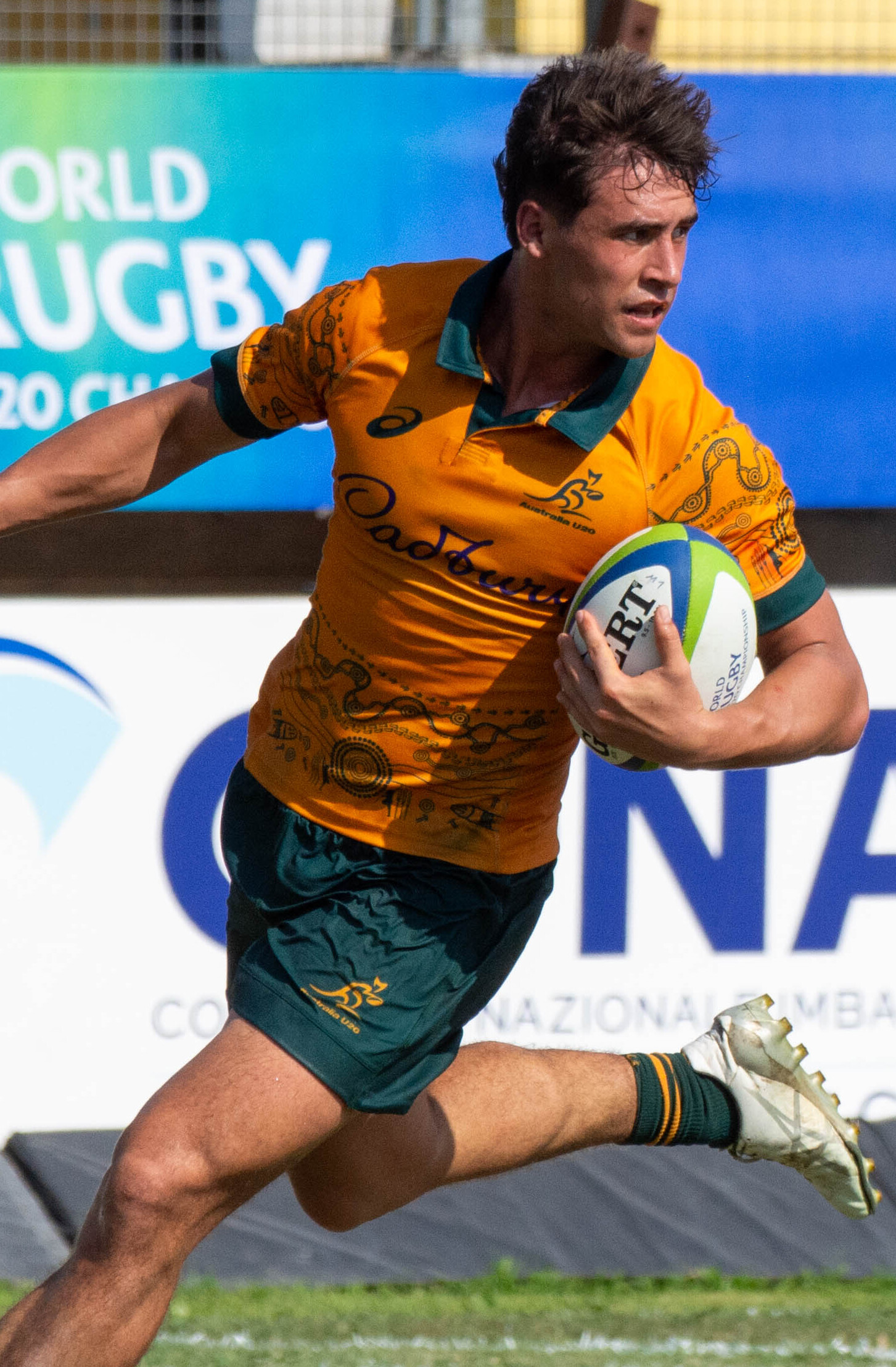
- Martens with Australia U20s at the 2025 World Rugby U20 Championship
- Born: 17 August 2005 (age 21) Australia
- Height: 187 cm (6 ft 2 in)
- Weight: 92 kg (203 lb; 14 st 7 lb)
- School: Brisbane Boys' College; Marist College Canberra
- Notable relative: Hentie Martens (father)

Rugby union career
- Position: Scrum-half
- Current team: Reds
Senior career
Years	Team	Apps	(Points)
2026–	Reds	1	(0)
- Correct as of 13 February 2026
International career
Years	Team	Apps	(Points)
2025	Australia U20	8	(25)
- Correct as of 13 February 2026

James Martens (born 17 August 2005) is an Australian rugby union player who plays for the Reds in the Super Rugby. His position is scrum-half.

== Early career ==
Australian-born, Martens first attended Marist College Canberra, where he played cricket and rugby union. He later attended Brisbane Boys' College, where he played rugby. A member of the Reds academy, he plays his club rugby for GPS. In 2025, he represented the Australia U20 national side. He is the son of former Springbok Hentie Martens.

== Professional career ==
Martens was first named in the Reds squad for the 2025 Super Rugby AUS competition, He had previously debuted against Tonga in August 2025. He was then named in the Reds squad for the 2026 Super Rugby Pacific season, before signing a new contract in January 2026. He made his debut for the Reds in Round 1 of the season against the Waratahs.
