= John Minto (rugby league) =

Australian rugby league footballer

Personal information
- Full name: John Minto
- Born: 10 January 1972 (age 54)

Playing information
- Position: Wing
Club
| Years | Team | Pld | T | G | FG | P |
|---|---|---|---|---|---|---|
| 1992–93 | South Sydney | 15 | 4 | 0 | 0 | 16 |
| 1996 | London Broncos | 20 | 4 | 0 | 0 | 16 |
| | Total | 35 | 8 | 0 | 0 | 32 |

John Minto is an Australian former rugby league footballer who played in the 1990s. John was a promising school boy athlete winning state and national junior beach sprint championships with Terrigal SLSC. John attended St Gregory's College Campbelltown excelling on the athletics track and being named Man of the Match in the Commonwealth Bank Cup 1989 Grand Final winning team. He played for South Sydney in the NSWRL Competition and for the London Broncos in the Super League.

== Background ==
Minto played his junior rugby league for The Entrance Tigers and St Edwards College East Gosford prior to attending St Gregory's College Campbelltown. In 1989 John represented NSW Schools against the touring U19 British Amateur Rugby League Association (BARLA). He also played matches for U19 NSWRL teams against U19QRL sides in 1990 and 1991.

== Playing career ==
Minto made his first grade debut for South Sydney in round 2 of the 1992 season against North Sydney at the Sydney Football Stadium. Minto scored his first try in the top grade in round 5 1992 against St. George at the same venue.

Minto was known as one of the fastest players in the competition and he finished second in a sprint race against Brett Dallas, Lee Oudenryn and Shane Whereat

Minto played with Souths until the end of 1994 before departing the club. In 1996, Minto joined the London Broncos and played one season with them in the Super League before returning to Australia. In 2001, Minto played for Souths when the club was excluded from the NRL competition and were seeking readmission back to the league.
