= 2025 World Rugby U20 Championship =

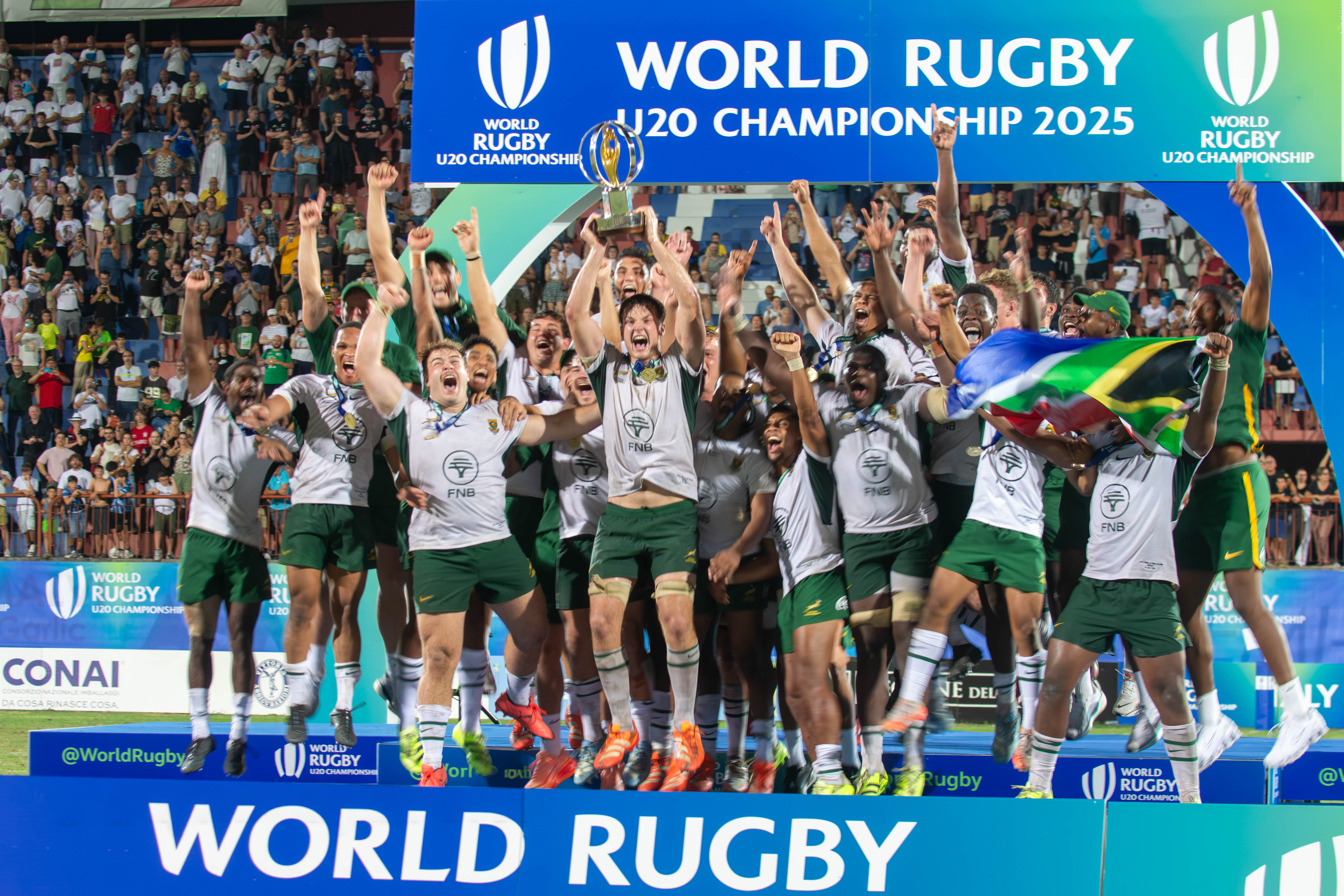

Tournament details
- Host: Italy
- Venue: 4
- Date: 29 June – 19 July 2025 (21 days)
- Teams: 12

Final positions
- Champions: South Africa (2nd title)
- Runner-up: New Zealand
- Third place: Argentina
- Fourth place: France

Tournament statistics
- Matches played: 30
- Tries scored: 264 (8.8 per match)
- Top scorer(s): (South Africa) Vusi Moyo (63)
- Most tries: (Georgia (country)) Mikheil Shioshvili (7)

The 2025 World Rugby U20 Championship (Italian: Campionato mondiale giovanile 2025), also known as Italia 2025, was the 15th edition of the premier age-grade (World Rugby Under-20 Championship) rugby union competition. It was held from 29 June to 19 July in Italy, being hosted in the cities of Viadana, Calvisano, Verona and Rovigo. The country has previously hosted the age-grade Championship twice before: 2011 and 2015. Italy were also confirmed to host the 2020 edition, but the tournament was cancelled due to the COVID-19 pandemic.

== Qualification ==
The championship featured twelve teams, eleven of which are ranked based on their performance in the previous edition of the tournament (2024), with the twelfth being 2024 World Rugby Under 20 Trophy winners Scotland, who returned to the Championship having been relegated in 2019. Scotland replaced Fiji who were relegated after finishing twelfth in 2024. Due to 2026 edition being re-expanded to 16 teams (16 teams participated in 2008 and 2009), this was first-ever edition where no team got relegated.

England entered as defending champions, whom defeated France 21–13 in the 2024 final.

== Teams ==
The teams participating in the tournament are listed in the table below, with a summary of their previous best results at the World Rugby Under 20 Championship included.

Team	No.	Result (2024)	Best Result
Argentina	14	5th	Third place (2016)
Australia	14	6th	Runners-up (2010, 2019)
England	14	1st	Champions (2013, 2014, 2016, 2024)
France	14	2nd	Champions (2018, 2019, 2023)
Georgia	6	9th	Eighth place (2023)
Ireland	14	4th	Runners-up (2016, 2023)
Italy	12	10th	Eighth place (2017, 2018)
New Zealand	14	3rd	Champions (2008, 2009, 2010, 2011, 2015, 2017)
South Africa	14	7th	Champions (2012)
Scotland	12	—N/a (Note: In 2024, Scotland were competing in the second-tier youth rugby competition, World Rugby Under 20 Trophy. They won the tournament, which gained them promotion to the World Rugby U20 Championship.)	Fifth place (2017)
Spain	1	11th	Eleventh place (2024)
Wales	14	8th	Runners-up (2013)

== Match officials ==
The following officials were named for the tournament, with an official panel of ten referees designated to oversee the game, and five television match officials / foul play review officers. Along side the World Rugby appointed officials, local home union referees were used as assistant referees.

Referees

- Tomas Bertazza (Argentina)
- Ben Breakspear (Wales)
- Griffin Colby (South Africa)
- Katsuki Furuse (Japan)
- Peter Martin (Ireland)
- Marcus Playle (New Zealand)
- Jérémy Rozier (France)
- Filippo Russo (Italy)
- Lex Weiner (United States)
- Morgan White (Hong Kong China)

Assistant Referees

- Luca Bisetto (Italy)
- Riccardo Bonato (Italy)
- Alberto Favaro (Italy)
- Alex Frasson (Italy)
- Franco Rosella (Italy)
- Lorenzo Pedezzi (Italy)

Television match officials / Foul play review officer

- Leo Colgan (Ireland)
- Graham Cooper (Australia)
- Aled Griffiths (Wales)
- Quinton Immelman (South Africa)
- Dan Jones (England)

== Venues ==
Four venues were announced on 14 March in line with the announcement of the hosts. It included Stadio San Michele, Calvisano and Stadio Luigi Zaffanella, Viadana who previously hosted the tournament in 2015, whilst Stadio Mario Battaglini, Rovigo hosted the tournament in 2011. It will be the first time Payanini Center, Verona has hosted the event when in Italy, though was due to host matches in the cancelled 2020 edition.

Viadana (Lombardy)	Rovigo (Veneto)	Calvisano (Lombardy)	Verona (Veneto)
Stadio Luigi Zaffanella	Stadio Mario Battaglini	Stadio San Michele	Payanini Center
Capacity: 6,000	Capacity: 5,500	Capacity: 5,000	Capacity: 2,500
2025 World Rugby U20 Championship is located in Italy		2025 World Rugby U20 Championship is located in Northern Italy	

== Pool stage ==
=== Pool A ===
Pos	Team	Pld	W	D	L	PF	PA	PD	TF	TA	TB	LB	Pts	Qualification
1	South Africa	3	3	0	0	178	53	+125	26	8	3	0	15	Advance to Semi-finals
2	England	3	2	0	1	114	84	+30	16	12	2	0	10	Advance to Fifth-Place Semi-finals
3	Australia	3	1	0	2	84	133	−49	14	20	2	1	7	Advance to Fifth-Place Semi-finals
4	Scotland	3	0	0	3	57	163	−106	9	25	1	0	1	Advance to Ninth-Place Semi-finals

Updated to match(es) played on unknown. Source: World Rugby

29 June 2025
15:30 CEST (UTC+02)

(1 BP) England	56–19	Scotland
Try: Penalty try 10'; Bracken (2) 14' c, 38' c James (2) 20' c, 28' c Knight 33' c Bellamy 72' c Redshaw 74' c Con: Coen (5/5) 15', 21', 30', 33', 39'; Bellamy (2/2) 73', 75'	Report	Try: Penalty try 12'; Cowan 7' m Patterson 76' c Con: Urwin (1/2) 77'

Payanini Center, Verona
Referee: Marcus Playle (New Zealand)

29 June 2025
15:30 CEST (UTC+02)

Australia	17–73	South Africa (1 BP)
Try: Harvey 13' m Watters (2) 70' m, 73' c Con: Harvey (1/3) 74'	Report	Try: Pead (2) 6' c, 45' c Lubbe 24' c Ndlozi (2) 31' c, 37' c Jooste 40' m Mentoe 47' c Theron 49' c Grobbelaar 53' m Nyali 58' c Williams 80' c Con: Moyo (7/9) 7', 25', 32', 38', 46', 48', 50'; Van der Merwe (2/2) 59', 80'

Stadio San Michele, Calvisano
Referee: Katsuki Furuse (Japan)

4 July 2025
15:30 CEST (UTC+02)

(1 BP) Australia	34–24	Scotland (1 BP)
Try: Martens (2) 10' m, 65' c Conway 16' m Ata 28' c Baxter 71' m Guilfoyle 75' m Con: Harvey (2/6) 29', 66'	Report	Try: Douglas 13' m Duncan (2) 22' m, 62' c Findlay 45' c Con: Urwin (1/3) 46'; Coates (1/1) 63'

Stadio Luigi Zaffanella, Viadana
Referee: Lex Weiner (United States)

4 July 2025
18:00 CEST (UTC+02)

England	22–32	South Africa (1 BP)
Try: Weimann 7' c Treacey 11' c Bracken 32' m Con: Bellamy (1/1) 8'; Coen (1/2) 11'; Pen: Coen (1/1) 37'	Report	Try: Jooste 23' c Pead (2) 28' m, 50' c Mentoe 35' c Con: Moyo (2/3) 23', 36', 50'; Pen: Moyo (2/2) 46', 59'

Stadio Mario Battaglini, Rovigo
Referee: Tomas Bertazza (Argentina)

9 July
15:30 CEST (UTC+02)

(1 BP) South Africa	73–14	Scotland
Try: Williams (2) 4' c, 16' c Biyela 10' c Malgas 13' c Reid 21' c Mentoe 31' c Erasmus 35' m Everson (2) 61' c, 71' c Linde 64' c Pead 80' c Con: Moyo (4/5) 5', 13', 16', 22'; Van der Merwe (5/6) 32', 62', 65', 71', 80+1'	Report	Try: Stephen 29' c Finlayson-Russell 74' c Con: Urwin (1/1) 30'; Brown (1/1) 74'

Stadio San Michele, Calvisano
Referee: Ben Breakspear (Wales)

9 July 2025
18:00 CEST (UTC+02)

(1 BP) England	36–33	Australia (2 BP)
Try: Treacey 12' c Tuipulotu (3) 34' m, 40+1' c, 45' c Bracken 62' c Con: Coen (4/5) 13', 40+1', 45', 63'; Pen: Coen (1/1) 80'	Report	Try: Conway (2) 14' c, 49' c Sharples 64' c King 68' c Martens 75' m Con: Fowler (4/5) 15', 50', 64', 69'

Payanini Center, Verona
Referee: Jérémy Rozier (France)

=== Pool B ===
Pos	Team	Pld	W	D	L	PF	PA	PD	TF	TA	TB	LB	Pts	Qualification
1	France	3	3	0	0	136	58	+78	20	8	3	0	15	Advance to Semi-finals
2	Argentina	3	2	0	1	93	109	−16	14	15	3	0	11	Advance to Semi-finals
3	Wales	3	1	0	2	83	94	−11	11	13	1	1	6	Advance to Fifth-Place Semi-finals
4	Spain	3	0	0	3	66	117	−51	8	17	1	1	2	Advance to Ninth-Place Semi-finals

Updated to match(es) played on unknown. Source: World Rugby

29 June 2025
18:00 CEST (UTC+02)

(1 BP) France	49–11	Spain
Try: Baret (2) 7' c, 49' c Britz 16' c Sanson 36' c Akrab 55' c Tilloles 68' c Leveque 80' c Con: Keletaona (5/5) 8', 17', 37', 50' 56'; Jurd (2/2) 69', 80'	Report	Try: González 58' m Pen: Otamendi (2/2) 5', 11'

Payanini Center, Verona
Referee: Filippo Russo (Italy)

29 June 2025
20:30 CEST (UTC+02)

(1 BP) Argentina	34–27	Wales (1 BP)
Try: Ledesma 15' c Rapetti (2) 32' m, 43' m Silva 34' c Garcia 77' c Con: Benedit (3/5) 15', 35', 78'; Pen: Benedit (1/1) 53'	Report	Try: Penalty try 3'; Emanuel 24' c Minto 28' c Con: Ford (2/2) 25', 29'; Pen: Ford (2/2) 21', 50'

Payanini Center, Verona
Referee: Griffin Colby (South Africa)

4 July 2025
15:30 CEST (UTC+02)

(1 BP) France	35–21	Wales
Try: Tilloles 3' c Njocke 53' c Daunivucu 56' c Mousques 62' c Bissu 70' c Con: Jurd (5/5) 4', 54', 57', 63', 71'	Report	Try: Scott 9' c Bowen 14' c Woods 17' c Con: Wilde (3/3) 9', 15', 18'

Stadio Mario Battaglini, Rovigo
Referee: Morgan White (Hong Kong China)

4 July 2025
20:30 CEST (UTC+02)

(1 BP) Argentina	33–30	Spain (2 BP)
Try: Penalty try 24'; Otano (2) 50' m, 59' c Coll 55' c Galvan 65' c Con: Senillosa (3/4) 56', 60', 66'	Report	Try: Ortega 4' m Garcia (2) 27' c, 38' c Richardis 35' m Con: Infer (2/3) 27', 39'; Pen: Infer (2/2) 20', 22'

Stadio Mario Battaglini, Rovigo
Referee: Peter Martin (Ireland)

9 July 2025
15:30 CEST (UTC+02)

(1 BP) Wales	35–25	Spain
Try: Penalty try 7'; Wood 17' c James 51' c Davies 61' c Woods 70' c Con: Wilde (4/4) 18', 52', 62', 71'	Report	Try: Garcia 24' c McNamee 32' m Lendinez 67' c Con: Infer (1/2) 24'; Otamendi (1/1) 67'; Pen: Infer (2/2) 5', 10'

Payanini Center, Verona
Referee: Lex Weiner (United States)

9 July 2025
20:30 CEST (UTC+02)

(1 BP) France	52–26	Argentina (1 BP)
Try: Njocke 2' c Donguy 6' c Akrab 10' c Leveque 13' m Ibsaiene (2) 31' c, 34' m Gourgues 57' c Baret 60' c Con: Keletaona (6/8) 3', 7', 11', 32', 58', 61'	Report	Try: Ledesma 23' c Rapetti 46' c Coll 53' m Otano 73' c Con: Senillosa (3/4) 24', 47', 74'

Payanini Center, Verona
Referee: Marcus Playle (New Zealand)

=== Pool C ===
Pos	Team	Pld	W	D	L	PF	PA	PD	TF	TA	TB	LB	Pts	Qualification
1	New Zealand	3	3	0	0	121	46	+75	19	7	2	0	14	Advance to Semi-finals
2	Italy (H)	3	1	1	1	42	49	−7	6	7	0	0	6	Advance to Fifth-Place Semi-finals
3	Ireland	3	1	0	2	73	115	−42	10	17	1	1	6	Advance to Ninth-Place Semi-finals
4	Georgia	3	0	1	2	66	92	−26	10	14	1	1	4	Advance to Ninth-Place Semi-finals

Updated to match(es) played on unknown. Source: World Rugby
(H) Host

29 June 2025
18:00 CEST (UTC+02)

(1 BP) Ireland	35–28	Georgia (2 BP)
Try: Farrell (2) 2' m, 42' m Walker 23' c Ronan 52' c Molony 61' m Con: Wood (2/5) 24', 53'; Pen: Wood (2/3) 10', 33'	Report	Try: Margvelashvili 16' c Spanderashvili (2) 31' c, 50' c Kheladze 81' c Con: Takaishvili (4/4) 17', 31', 51', 82'

Stadio San Michele, Calvisano
Referee: Jérémy Rozier (France)

29 June 2025
20:30 CEST (UTC+02)

New Zealand	14–5	Italy
Try: Letiu 8' c Pledger 39' c Con: Cole (2/2) 9', 40'	Report	Try: Beni 44' m

Stadio San Michele, Calvisano
Referee: Peter Martin (Ireland)

4 July 2025
18:00 CEST (UTC+02)

(1 BP) New Zealand	38–19	Georgia
Try: Saunoa (2) 15' c, 21' m Treacy 24' c Oudenryn 33' c Vakasiuola 39' m Kunawave 46' c Con: Simpson (4/6) 16', 25', 34', 47'	Report	Try: Kheladze 9' c Shioshvili 18' c Khakhubia 55' m Con: Takaishvili (2/3) 10', 19'

Stadio Luigi Zaffanella, Viadana
Referee: Filippo Russo (Italy)

4 July 2025
20:30 CEST (UTC+02)

(1 BP) Ireland	16–18	Italy
Try: Yarr 63' m Minogue 80+1' m Pen: Wood (2/2) 25', 52'	Report	Try: Casartelli 12' m Gritti 59' c Con: Todaro (1/1) 60'; Pen: Todaro (2/3) 36', 72'

Stadio Luigi Zaffanella, Viadana
Referee: Ben Breakspear (Wales)

9 July 2025
18:00 CEST (UTC+02)

(1 BP) New Zealand	69–22	Ireland
Try: Bason 11' c Treacy 21' c Roberts 26' m Cole 30' m Pledger (2) 33' c, 43' c Vaenuku 41' m Kempton (2) 48' c, 80' m Kunawave (2) 67' c, 80+2' c Con: Cole (6/10) 11', 22', 34', 44', 49', 80+3'; Simpson (1/1) 67'	Report	Try: Minogue 3' c Green 7' m Bohan 75' c Con: Wood (1/2) 4'; Wisniewski (1/1) 75'; Pen: Wood (1/1) 20'

Stadio San Michele, Calvisano
Referee: Griffin Colby (South Africa)

9 July 2025
20:30 CEST (UTC+02)

Georgia	19–19	Italy
Try: Khakhubia 33' m Spanderashvili 46' c Shioshvili 80' c Con: Takaishvili (2/3) 47', 80'	Report	Try: Zanandrea 13' m Casartelli 37' c Todaro 80+5' c Con: Todaro (2/3) 38', 80+6'

Stadio San Michele, Calvisano
Referee: Katsuki Furuse (Japan)

=== Seeding ===
Pos	Team	P	W	Diff.	Pts
1	South Africa (A)	3	3	+125	15
2	France (B)	3	3	+78	15
3	New Zealand (C)	3	3	+75	14
4	Argentina (B)	3	2	–16	11
5	England (A)	3	2	+30	10
6	Australia (A)	3	1	–49	7
7	Italy (C)	3	1	–7	6
8	Wales (B)	3	1	–11	6
9	Ireland (C)	3	1	–42	6
10	Georgia (C)	3	0	–26	4
11	Spain (B)	3	0	–51	2
12	Scotland (A)	3	0	–106	1

Updated to match(es) played on 9 July 2025. Source: World Rugby

== Knockout stage ==
=== Ninth-place bracket ===
Semi-finals
14 July – Verona
Georgia	43
Spain	12
14 July – Verona
Ireland	21
Scotland	22

Ninth-place Final
19 July – Calvisano
Georgia	22
Scotland	7
Third place
19 July – Calvisano
Spain	37
Ireland	38

==== Ninth-place Semi-finals ====
14 July 2025
15:30 CEST (UTC+02)

Georgia	43–12	Spain
Try: Shioshvili (3) 9' m, 23' c, 74' c Meskhidze 17' m Ardzenadze 28' c Kheladze 43' c Kevkhishvili 57' m Con: Takaishvili (2/4) 24', 29'; Jashi (2/3) 44', 74'	Report	Try: Zuriarrain 39' c Serrano 49' m Con: Otamendi (1/2) 40'

Payanini Center, Verona
Referee: Morgan White (Hong Kong China)

14 July 2025
18:00 CEST (UTC+02)

Ireland	21–22	Scotland
Try: Walker 25' c McLaughlin 64' c Farrell 69' c Con: Green (3/3) 25', 64', 70'	Report	Try: Moncrieff 6' m Stephen 11' m Duncan 28' c Shearer 80' m Con: Urwin (1/3) 29'

Payanini Center, Verona
Referee: Filippo Russo (Italy)

==== Eleventh-place Final ====
19 July 2025
15:30 CEST (UTC+02)

Spain	37–38	Ireland
Try: Massoni 14' m Gomez 39' c Cuesta 46' c Ofojetu 59' m Richardis 62' c Con: Infer (2/4) 40', 46'; Otamendi (1/1) 62'; Pen: Infer (2/2) 11', 43'	Report	Try: Scott (2) 3' c, 34' c Molony 8' c Green 21' m Walker (2) 48' c, 79' m Con: Wood (4/6) 4', 9', 35', 49'

Stadio San Michele, Calvisano
Referee: Tomas Bertazza (Argentina)

==== Ninth-place Final ====
19 July 2025
20:30 CEST (UTC+02)

Georgia	22–7	Scotland
Try: Kheladze 15' m Shioshvili (2) 22' c, 59' m Gurtskaia 30' m Con: Bolkvadze (1/3) 23'	Report	Try: Logan 33' c Con: Urwin (1/1) 34'

Stadio San Michele, Calvisano
Referee: Griffin Colby (South Africa)

=== Fifth-place bracket ===
Semi-finals
14 July – Verona
Italy	21
Australia	44
14 July – Viadana
England	51
Wales	13

Fifth-place Final
19 July – Rovigo
Australia	68
England	40
Third place
19 July – Rovigo
Italy	31
Wales	23

==== Fifth-place Semi-finals ====
14 July 2025
15:30 CEST (UTC+02)

England	51–13	Wales
Try: Penalty try 29'; Ridl 33' m McParland (2) 40' m, 63' c Bellamy 55' c Bracken 60' c Lilley 77' c Con: Coen (4/6) 56', 61', 65', 77'; Pen: Coen (2/3) 70', 74'	Report	Try: Davies 31' c Con: Wilde (1/1) 32'; Pen: Wilde (2/2) 8', 16'

Stadio Luigi Zaffanella, Viadana
Referee: Peter Martin (Ireland)

14 July 2025
20:30 CEST (UTC+02)

Italy	21–44	Australia
Try: Caiolo-Serra 16' c Mistrulli 47' c Todaro 55' c Con: Braga (3/3) 17', 48', 56'	Report	Try: Ekanayake 4' c Wilcox 6' m Enasio 20' c Doyle 39' m Fowler 62' c Langi 69' c Con: Fowler (4/6) 5', 21', 63', 70'; Pen: Fowler (2/2) 43', 59'

Payanini Center, Verona
Referee: Tomas Bertazza (Argentina)

==== Seventh-place Final ====
19 July 2025
15:30 CEST (UTC+02)

Italy	31–23	Wales
Try: Casartelli (2) 29' c, 48' c Zanandrea 36' m Con: Braga (2/3) 30', 49'; Pen: Braga (4/5) 17', 56', 69', 77'	Report	Try: Davies 25' c Boshoff 80' c Con: Ford (2/2) 26', 80+1'; Pen: Ford (3/3) 10', 40', 51'

Stadio Mario Battaglini, Rovigo
Referee: Marcus Playle (New Zealand)

==== Fifth-place Final ====
19 July 2025
18:00 CEST (UTC+02)

Australia	68–40	England
Try: Langi 4' c Ekanayake (2) 8' c, 73' c Harvey (2) 13' c, 23' c Fowler 30' c Watters 49' m Enasio (2) 57' c, 77' c Martens 60' c Con: Fowler (7/8) 5', 9', 13', 24', 31', 58', 60'; Harvey (2/2) 74', 78'	Report	Try: Tuipulotu 17' c Ridl 21' c Williams 36' c Sela 52' c Knight 61' c Hammick 75' m Con: Coen (5/6) 18', 22', 37', 53', 62'

Stadio Mario Battaglini, Rovigo
Referee: Morgan White (Hong Kong China)

=== Finals bracket ===
Semi-finals
14 July – Viadana
France	26
New Zealand	34
14 July – Viadana
South Africa	48
Argentina	24

Final
19 July – Rovigo
New Zealand	15
South Africa	23
Third place
19 July – Calvisano
France	35
Argentina	38

==== Semi-finals ====
14 July 2025
18:00 CEST (UTC+02)

France	26–34	New Zealand
Try: Gourgues 13' c Britz 16' m Brau-Boirie 40' c Echegaray 63' c Con: Keletaona (2/3) 14', 40'; Jurd (1/1) 64'	Report	Try: Solomon 2' c Bason 9' c Wiseman 35' c Vakasiuola 68' c Con: Simpson (4/4) 3', 10', 36', 69'; Pen: Simpson (2/2) 17', 49'

Stadio Luigi Zaffanella, Viadana
Referee: Katsuki Furuse (Japan)

14 July 2025
20:30 CEST (UTC+02)

South Africa	48–24	Argentina
Try: Bester 9' c Pead 11' c Williams 17' c Theron 23' c Bester 60' c Jooste 80' c Con: Moyo (5/5) 10', 11', 18', 24', 61'; Malgas (1/1) 80'; Pen: Moyo (2/2) 55', 58'	Report	Try: Fiszman 39' c Silva 51' c Miranda 72' c Con: Benedit (2/2) 40', 52'; Senillosa (1/1) 73'; Pen: Benedit (1/1) 14'

Stadio Luigi Zaffanella, Viadana
Referee: Jérémy Rozier (France)

==== Third-place Final ====
19 July 2025
18:00 CEST (UTC+02)

France	35–38	Argentina
Try: Echegaray 23' c Deliance 41' c Bissu 42' c Leveque 67' c Baret 83' c Con: Jurd (3/3) 24', 42', 42'; Keletaona (2/2) 68', 83'	Report	Try: Correa 5' m Cambiasso (2) 47' m, 55' c García Iandolino 61' c Senillosa 65' c Otano 72' c Con: Senillosa (4/6) 55', 62', 66', 74'

Stadio San Michele, Calvisano
Referee: Lex Weiner (United States)

==== Final ====
19 July 2025
20:30 CEST (UTC+02)

New Zealand	15–23	South Africa
Try: Sa 16' m Kunawave 79' c Con: Cole (1/2) 79'; Pen: Simpson (1/1) 46'	Report	Try: Nyali 3' c Mentoe 77' c Con: Moyo (2/2) 4', 78'; Pen: Moyo (3/3) 22', 36', 57'

Stadio Mario Battaglini, Rovigo
Referee: Ben Breakspear (Wales)

New Zealand	South Africa

FB	15	Stanley Solomon
RW	14	Frank Vaenuku
OC	13	Cooper Roberts		(substituted off) 59'
IC	12	Jack Wiseman
LW	11	Maloni Kunawave
FH	10	Rico Simpson		(substituted off) 63'
SH	9	Dylan Pledger		(substituted off) 73'
N8	8	Mosese Bason		(substituted off) 26'	(substituted off) 59'
OF	7	Caleb Woodley
BF	6	Finn McLeod
RL	5	Jayden Sa		(substituted off) 55'
LL	4	Xavier Treacy	(yellow card) 71'
TP	3	Robson Faleafa		(substituted off) 63'
HK	2	Manumaua Letiu (c)		(substituted off) 60'
LP	1	Sika Uamaki Pole	Sent off (straight red)
Replacements:
HK	16	Eli Oudenryn		(substituted on) 60'
PR	17	Israel Time
PR	18	Dane Johnston		(substituted on) 63'
LK	19	Aisake Vakasiuola		(substituted on) 55'
N8	20	Micah Fale		(substituted on) 59'
SH	21	Jai Tamati		(substituted on) 73'
FH	22	Will Cole		(substituted on) 63'
OC	23	Tayne Harvey		(substituted on) 59'
Coach:
(New Zealand) Milton Haig

FB	15	Gilermo Mentoe
RW	14	Cheswill Joostee
OC	13	Demitre Erasmus		(substituted off) 80'
IC	12	Albertus Bester	(yellow card) 32'
LW	11	Jaco Williams
FH	10	Vusi Simphiwe Moyo
SH	9	Hassiem Pead		(substituted off) 80'
N8	8	Wandile Mlaba		(substituted off) 55'
BF	7	Bathobele Hlekani
OF	6	Xola Nyali		(substituted off) 26'
RL	5	JJ Theron		(substituted off) 23'	(substituted on) 33'	(substituted off) 55'
LL	4	Riley Norton (c)
TP	3	Herman Lubbe		(substituted off) 47'
HK	2	Siphosethu Mnebelele		(substituted off) 73'
LP	1	Simphiwe Ngobese		(substituted off) 55'
Replacements:
HK	16	Juandre Schoeman		(substituted on) 73'
PR	17	Oliver Reid		(substituted on) 55'
PR	18	JD Erasmus		(substituted on) 47'
LK	19	Jaco Grobbelaar		(substituted on) 23'	(substituted off) 33'	(substituted on) 55'
N8	20	Matt Romao		(substituted on) 55'
OF	21	Fano Linde		(substituted on) 26'
SH	22	Ceano Everson		(substituted on) 80'
IC	23	Dominic Malgas		(substituted on) 80'
Coach:
(South Africa) Kevin Foote

Player of the Tournament:
Hassiem Pead (South Africa)

Assistant referees:
Jérémy Rozier (France)
Katsuki Furuse (Japan)
Television match official:
Aled Griffiths (Wales)
Foul play Review Officer (FPRO):
Leo Colgan (Ireland)

== Statistics ==
=== Point scorers ===
Pos.	Player	Points
1	Vusi Moyo	63
2	Ben Coen	50
3	Joey Fowler	46
4	Mikheili Shioshvili	35
5	Luka Keletaona	30
5	Hassiem Pead	30
7	Tom Wood	29
8	Nicolas Infer	28
9	Rico Simpson	27
9	Pascal Senillosa	27
11	Sidney Harvey	25
11	Jack Bracken	25
11	Harri Ford	25

=== Try scorers ===
Pos.	Player	Tries
1	Mikheili Shioshvili	7
2	Hassiem Pead	6
3	Jack Bracken	5
4	Jerónimo Otano	4
4	James Martens	4
4	Kepueli Tuipulotu	4
4	Mathis Baret	4
4	Shota Kheladze	4
4	Henry Walker	4
4	Nelson Casartelli	4
4	Maloni Kunawave	4
4	Gilermo Mentoe	4
4	Jaco Williams	4

== Final rankings ==
R	Team	Pl	P	W	D	L	PF	PA	Diff.	TF	TA
1	South Africa	A	5	5	0	0	249	92	+157	34	13
2	New Zealand	C	5	4	0	1	170	95	+75	25	13
3	Argentina	B	5	3	0	2	155	192	–37	23	26
4	France	B	5	3	0	2	197	130	+67	29	18
5th–8th playoffs
5	Australia	A	5	3	0	2	196	194	+2	30	29
6	England	A	5	3	0	2	205	165	+40	29	23
7	Italy	C	5	2	1	2	94	116	–22	12	15
8	Wales	B	5	1	0	4	119	176	–57	14	23
9th–12th playoffs
9	Georgia	C	5	2	1	2	131	111	+20	21	17
10	Scotland	A	5	1	0	4	86	206	–120	14	32
11	Ireland	C	5	2	0	3	132	174	–42	19	26
12	Spain	B	5	0	0	5	115	198	–83	15	30
