= Aisake Vakasiuola =

New Zealand rugby union player

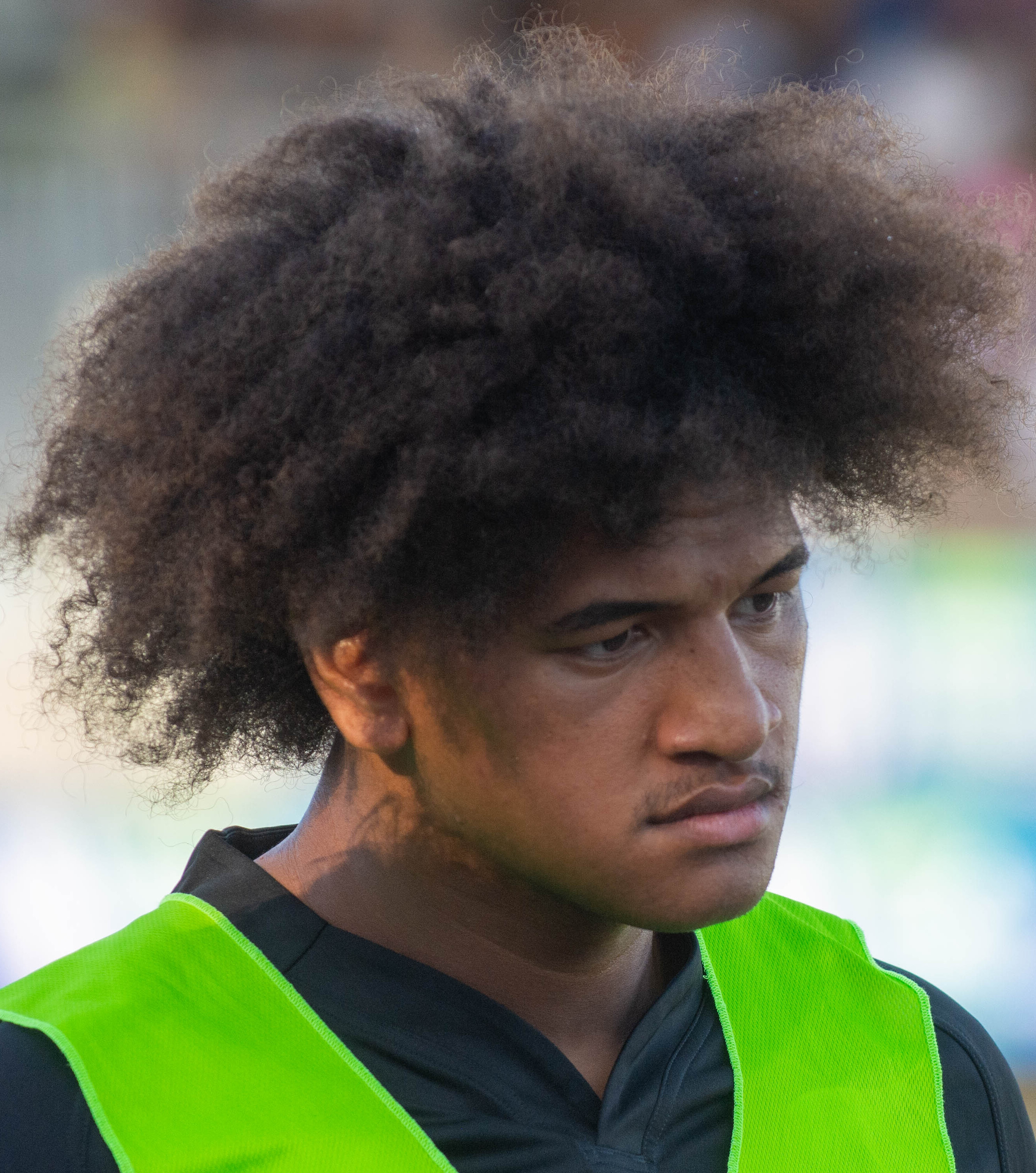
- Vakasiuola at the 2025 World Rugby U20 Championship in Italy
- Born: 5 May 2005 (age 21) New Zealand
- Height: 197 cm (6 ft 6 in)
- Weight: 122 kg (269 lb; 19 st 3 lb)
- School: Tauranga Boys' College (Yr 13 only), Katikati College

Rugby union career
- Position: Lock
- Current team: Chiefs, Bay of Plenty
Senior career
Years	Team	Apps	(Points)
2024–	Bay of Plenty	14	(0)
2026–	Chiefs		
- Correct as of 9 November 2025
International career
Years	Team	Apps	(Points)
2025	New Zealand U20	4	(10)
- Correct as of 9 November 2025

Aisake Vakasiuola (born 5 May 2005) is a New Zealand rugby union player, who plays for the Chiefs and Bay of Plenty. His preferred position is lock.

== Early career ==
Vakasiuola attended Tauranga Boys' College where he played for the first XV. He represented New Zealand Schools in 2023, before joining the Chiefs academy, representing their U20 side in 2024. He was selected for New Zealand U20 in 2025.

== Professional career ==
Vakasiuola has represented Bay of Plenty in the National Provincial Championship since 2024, being named in the squad for the 2025 Bunnings NPC. He was named in the Chiefs squad for the 2026 Super Rugby Pacific season.
