= Haashim Pead =

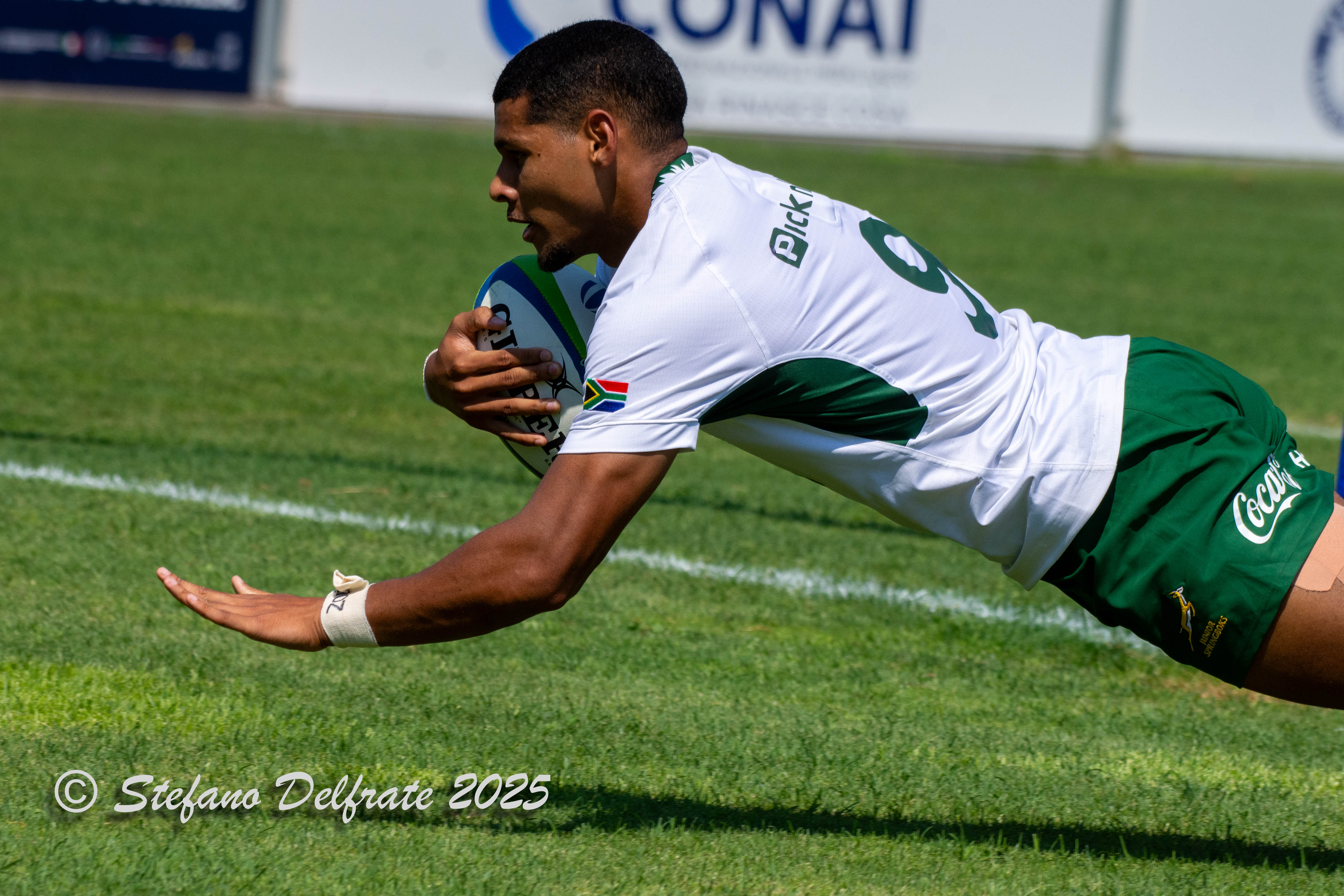
- 2025 World Rugby U20 Championship
- Born: 5 July 2005 (age 21) Bo-Kaap, South Africa
- Height: 1.75 m (5 ft 9 in)
- Weight: 77 kg (12.1 st; 170 lb)
- School: Bishops

Rugby union career
- Position: Scrum-half
Youth career
- 2022: Western Province XV U18
- 2023: Western Province U18
Senior career
Years	Team	Apps	(Points)
2025–2026	Golden Lions	4	(5)
2025–2026	Lions	12	(10)
2026-	Stormers		
- Correct as of 23 Sep 2026
International career
Years	Team	Apps	(Points)
2023	South Africa U18	2	(0)
2024-25	South Africa U20	9	(40)
2026-	South Africa 'A	1	(11)
- Correct as of 22 June 2026
Medal record
Men's rugby union
Representing South Africa
World Rugby U20 Championship
Gold medal – first place	2025 Italy	Squad

Haashim Pead (born 5 July 2005) is a South African rugby union player who plays as a scrum-half for the Stormers in the URC. Pead was a part of the South African team that won the 2025 World Rugby U20 championship, where he made his breakthrough and was named player of the tournament.

== Early career ==
Pead began playing rugby for the local Bo-Kaap team Schotsche Kloof Walmers RFC after growing up watching his father captain the first team. He matriculated from Bishops and represented the Western Province at the 2023 Craven Week, where he scored 2 tries and the WP team remained unbeaten throughout the tournament.

== Club career ==
=== Golden Lions ===
After his performance at the 2025 World Rugby U20 championship he was included in the Golden Lions squad for the 2025 Currie Cup

== International career ==
Pead would make his debut coming off the bench for the South Africa U20s in a 24–19 loss to Australia in the 2024 U20 Rugby Championship. The following season he would make his first start and he scored two tries against Argentina in the 2025 U20 Rugby Championship.

Pead was then included in the squad for the 2025 World Rugby U20 Championship in Italy, where he would make his break through. He scored 6 tries across 5 games, the second most in the tournament, and broke the record for most metres gained by a scrum-half in the group stages of the World Rugby U20 Championship (232m) that had previously been set by Antoine Dupont in 2016. After impressing at the tournament he was invited to train with the Springboks.

== Personal life ==
Pead is from the Bo-Kaap neighbourhood of Cape Town, one of the few majority Muslim areas in South Africa, and is a practicing Muslim. His uncle played for the Western Province team in the Currie Cup.
