= Jayden Sa =

New Zealand rugby union player

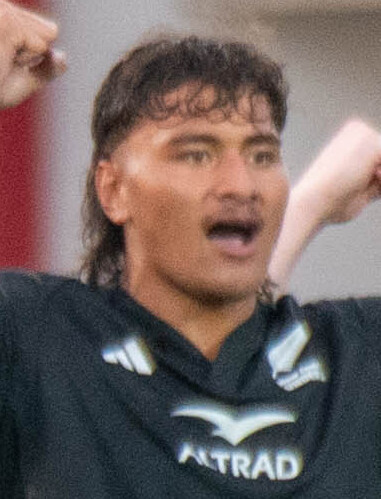
- Sa at the 2025 World Rugby U20 Championship in Italy
- Born: 14 January 2005 (age 21) New Zealand
- Height: 196 cm (6 ft 5 in)
- Weight: 117 kg (258 lb; 18 st 6 lb)
- School: Christ's College, Christchurch
- Notable relative: Fiti Sa (brother)

Rugby union career
- Position: Lock
- Current team: Chiefs, Taranaki
Senior career
Years	Team	Apps	(Points)
2024–	Taranaki	12	(10)
2026–	Chiefs		
- Correct as of 9 November 2025
International career
Years	Team	Apps	(Points)
2025	New Zealand U20	4	(5)
- Correct as of 9 November 2025

Jayden Sa (born 14 January 2005) is a New Zealand rugby union player, who plays for the Chiefs and Taranaki. His preferred position is Lock.

== Early career ==
Sa attended Christ's College, Christchurch where he played rugby for the first XV and earned selection for the Junior Crusaders in 2022. He earned selection for the New Zealand U20 side in 2025. He is the brother of fellow Chiefs lock Fiti Sa.

== Professional career ==
Sa has represented Taranaki in the National Provincial Championship since 2024, being named in the squad for the 2025 Bunnings NPC. He was named in the Chiefs squad for the 2026 Super Rugby Pacific season.
