= Erin Rush =

New Zealand rugby union player

- Born: 15 January 1970 (age 56) Napier, New Zealand
- Height: 1.68 m (5 ft 6 in)
- Weight: 70 kg (154 lb)

Rugby union career
- Position: Loose Forward
Provincial / State sides
Years	Team	Apps	(Points)
	Wellington		(0)
International career
Years	Team	Apps	(Points)
2003	New Zealand	2	(0)

Erin Rush (born 15 January 1970) is a former New Zealand rugby union player.

== Rugby career ==
Rush played club rugby for Wellington Axemen, she also spent four seasons with Old Boys University and played more than 50 games. She played over 100 games for Wellington Football Club and more than 50 representing Wellington.

She was part of the Black Ferns team that played a World XV's side in Auckland and Whangārei in 2003.

=== Administration career ===
She is the first woman to be elected as Vice President of New Zealand Rugby. She served as Chair of the Centurions Rugby Club. She was also a Citing commissioner for New Zealand Rugby and World Rugby.

== Personal life ==
Rush and her husband, Nigel Solomon, have two children and run a Harcourts real estate business. Her son, Stanley Solomon, represented New Zealand in the 2024 U20 Rugby Championship.

Her brother, Sean Rush, was a Wellington City councillor.
