= Xavier Rubens =

Australian rugby union footballer (born 2005)

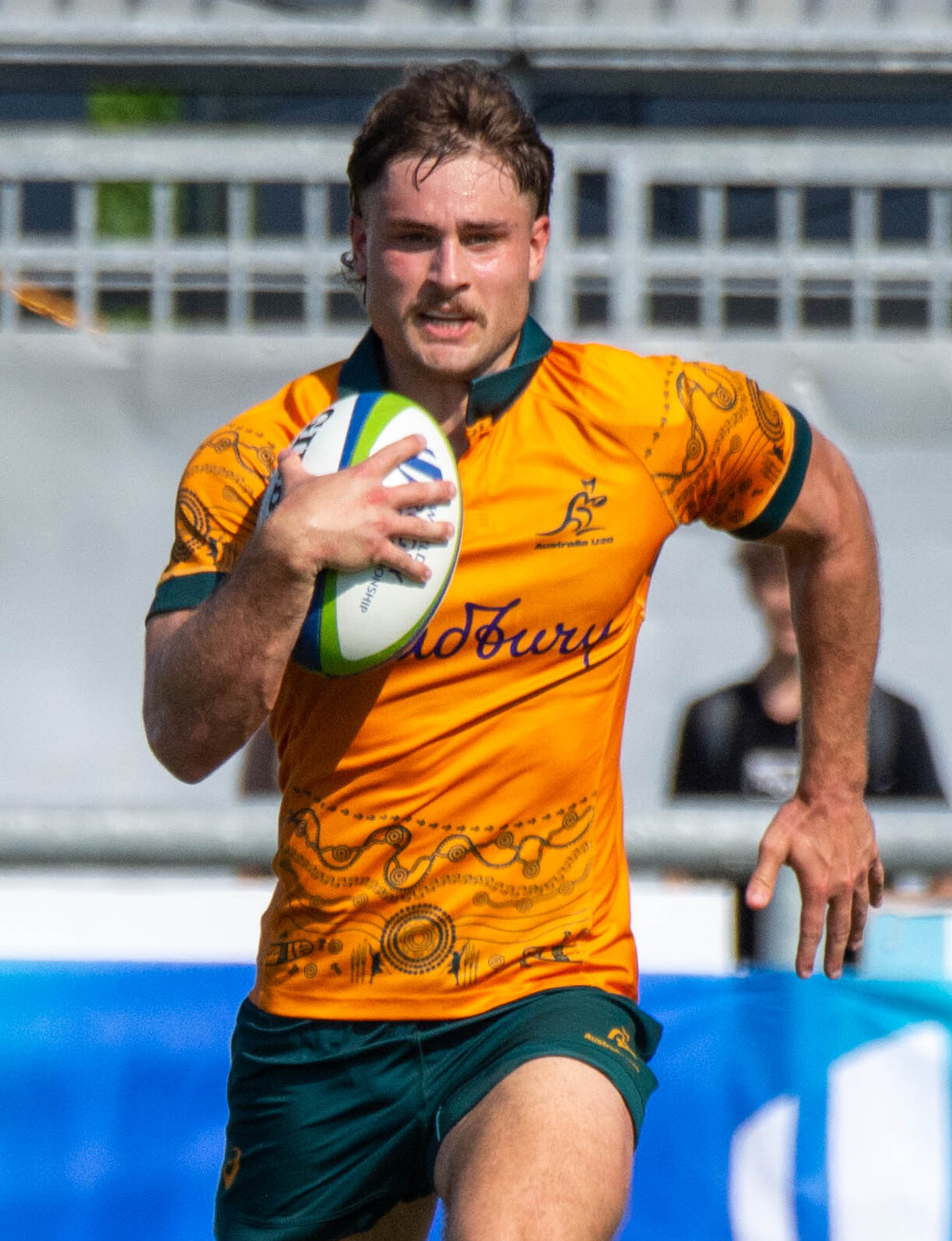
- Rubens with Australia U20s at the 2025 World Rugby U20 Championship
- Born: 26 July 2005 (age 21) Sydney, New South Wales, Australia
- Height: 186 cm (6 ft 1 in)
- Weight: 94 kg (207 lb; 14 st 11 lb)
- School: Brisbane Boys' College

Rugby union career
- Position(s): Centre, Wing
- Current team: Reds
Amateur team(s)
Years	Team	Apps	(Points)
- Souths
Senior career
Years	Team	Apps	(Points)
2026–	Reds	1	(0)
- Correct as of 13 February 2026
International career
Years	Team	Apps	(Points)
2024–2025	Australia U20	8	(10)
- Correct as of 13 February 2026

Xavier Rubens (born 26 July 2005) is an Australian rugby union player, who plays for the Reds in the Super Rugby. His primary position is centre.

== Early career ==
Rubens was born in Sydney, New South Wales, Australia in 2005. He played junior rugby for the West Houston Lions in Texas, and made his senior club debut for Souths in the Hospital Cup.

Rubens attended Brisbane Boys' College where he played rugby. A member of the Reds academy, he plays his club rugby for Souths. In 2024 and 2025, he represented the Australia U20s national side.

== Career ==
Rubens was first named in the Reds squad for the 2025 Super Rugby AUS competition, He had previously debuted against Tonga in August 2025. He was then named in the Reds squad for the 2026 Super Rugby Pacific season. He made his debut for the Reds in the first round of the season against the Waratahs.

In August 2026, the Reds announced that Rubens had signed a loan deal to join the Saitama Wild Knights of Japan until November 2026, where he would rejoin the Reds on their tour of Italy.

== Career statistics ==
=== Club ===
As of 31 August 2026.

Statistics by club, season and competition
Club	Season	League			
Club	Season	Division	Apps	Tries	Points
Reds	2026	Super Rugby Pacific	1	0	0
Reds	2027	Super Rugby Pacific	TBD		
Reds	Total		1	0	0
