= Fiti Sa =

New Zealand rugby union player

- Born: 4 April 2003 (age 23) Christchurch, New Zealand
- Height: 203 cm (6 ft 8 in)
- Weight: 125 kg (276 lb; 19 st 10 lb)
- School: Christ's College, Christchurch
- Notable relative: Jayden Sa (brother)

Rugby union career
- Position: Lock
- Current team: Chiefs, Taranaki
Senior career
Years	Team	Apps	(Points)
2023–	Taranaki	13	(0)
2025–	Chiefs	0	(0)
- Correct as of 10 December 2024

Fiti Sa (born 4 April 2003) is a New Zealand rugby union player, who plays for the Chiefs and Taranaki. His preferred position is lock.

== Early career ==
Sa was born in Christchurch and originally played rugby league, before picking up rugby union after moving to Wellington. After returning to Christchurch he attended Christ's College, Christchurch where he earned selection for NZ Barbarians and New Zealand U19. He represented Crusaders U20 before moving to Waikato ahead of 2023.

== Professional career ==
Sa has represented Taranaki in the National Provincial Championship since 2023, being named in their full squad for the 2024 Bunnings NPC. He was named in the Chiefs squad for the 2025 Super Rugby Pacific season in November 2024.
