= Mabel Wharekawa-Burt =

New Zealand Māori actress

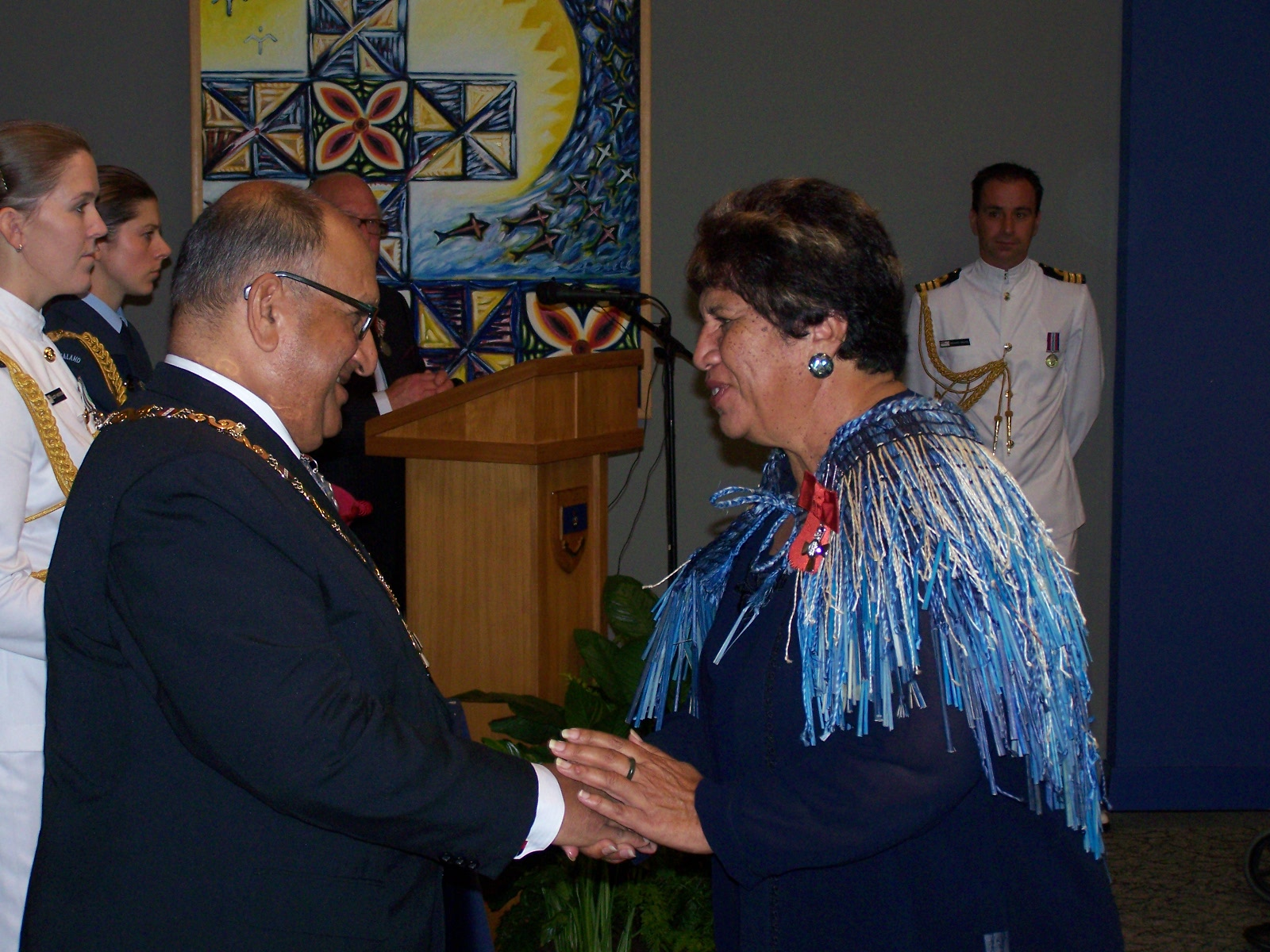
Wharekawa-Burt in 2009, after her investiture as a Member of the New Zealand Order of Merit by the governor-general Sir Anand Satyanand

Mabel Wharekawa-Burt MNZM is a New Zealand Māori film and television actress and community leader.

== Biography ==
Wharekawa-Burt was raised in Katikati, in New Zealand's Bay of Plenty, by her aunt and uncle as a whāngai adoption. Her home marae is Te Rereatukahia Marae. She attended Katikati College and was the first Māori student to serve as a prefect.

She has appeared in several feature films, including Whale Rider, In My Father's Den, Jubilee and Merry Christmas Mr Lawrence. She has also appeared in television programmes such as Shortland Street and Mataku.

=== Recognition ===
In the 2009 New Year Honours, Wharekawa-Burt was appointed a Member of the New Zealand Order of Merit, for services to the performing arts and the community.

In October 2019, Wharekawa-Burt was inducted into the hall of fame at the inaugural Vaine Rangatira awards for Cook Islands women.
