= Ben Coen =

English rugby union player (born 2005)

- Born: 11 January 2005 (age 21) Bristol, England
- Height: 1.77 m (5 ft 10 in)
- Weight: 84 kg (185 lb; 13 st 3 lb)
- School: Blundell's School
- University: University of Exeter

Rugby union career
- Position: Fly-half
- Current team: Exeter Chiefs
Senior career
| Years | Team | Apps | (Points) |
| 2024– | Exeter Chiefs | 10 | (14) |
| 2025– | → Cornish Pirates (loan) | | |
- Correct as of 10 January 2026
International career
| Years | Team | Apps | (Points) |
| 2024 | England U19 | 1 | (2) |
| 2024–2025 | England U20 | 14 | (96) |
- Correct as of 19 July 2025

Ben Coen (born 11 January 2005) is an English professional rugby union footballer who plays as a fly-half for Premiership Rugby club Exeter Chiefs.

== Early life ==
Born in Bristol, his father played rugby union for Worcester Warriors. He was educated at Blundell's School. Coen grew-up in Teignmouth in Devon, and played junior rugby for Teignmouth R.F.C. He joined Exeter Chiefs as a teenager. He attended the University of Exeter for whom he played BUCS Rugby.

== Club career ==
Coen signed a professional contract with Exeter Chiefs in the summer of 2024. He made his first senior start on 1 March 2025 against Sale Sharks in the Premiership Rugby Cup quarterfinals, a 50-14 win for his club, in which his performance was praised. Coen also started in the semi-final victory over Ealing Trailfinders but did not feature in the final which they lost against Bath. He made his Premiership debut later that season against Bristol Bears. He also played on loan at Cornish Pirates on a dual-registration during the 2025-26 and 2026-27 seasons.

== International career ==
Coen made his debut for England U19 in March 2024. Later that year he was a member of the England U20 squad at the 2024 World Rugby U20 Championship and started in the final as England defeated France at Cape Town Stadium to win the tournament.

Coen started the opening round of the 2025 Six Nations Under 20s Championship against Ireland and also played in their last game of the tournament which England lost against Wales at Cardiff Arms Park to miss out on a grand slam and ultimately finish runners-up. In June 2025, he was part of the England U20 squad that finished sixth at the 2025 World Rugby U20 Championship.

== Honours ==
England U20

- World Rugby Under 20 Championship
  - (gold) Champion (1): 2024
