= Riley Norton =

South African rugby union player

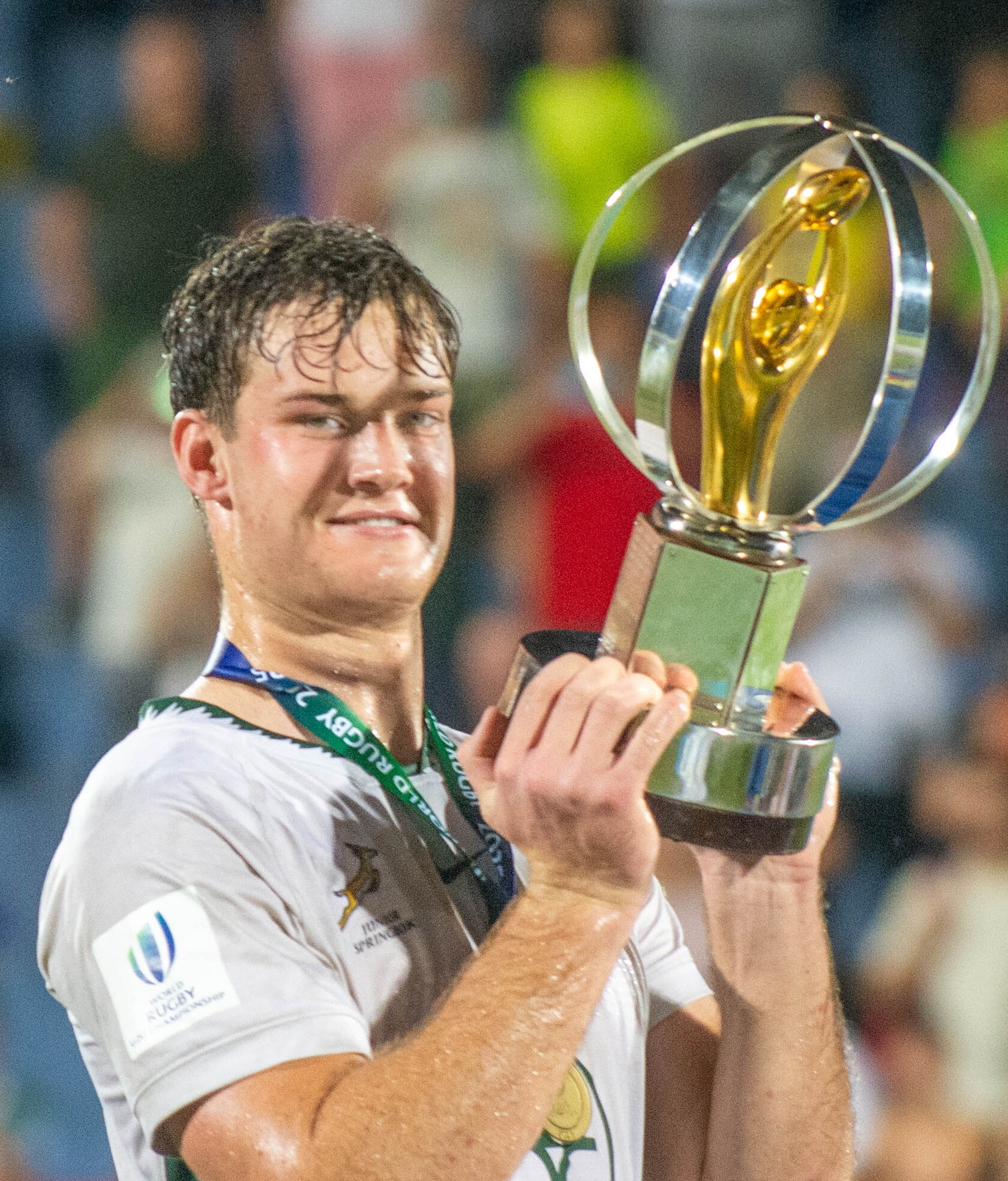
- Riley lifting the trophy for South Africa U20 in 2025
- Full name: Riley Norton
- Born: 2 January 2006 (age 20) Stellenbosch, South Africa
- Height: 199 cm (6 ft 6 in)
- Weight: 117 kg (258 lb; 18 st 6 lb)
- School: Paul Roos Gimnasium
- University: Stellenbosch University

Rugby union career
- Position: Lock
- Current team: Stormers
Youth career
- 2023–2024: Western Province U18
Senior career
Years	Team	Apps	(Points)
2026–	Stormers U23		
2026–	Stormers	5	(0)
- Correct as of 22 June 2026
International career
Years	Team	Apps	(Points)
2023-2024	South Africa U18	4	(0)
2025	South Africa U19	2	(0)
2025-2026	South Africa U20	13	(5)
2026-	Springboks	1	(5)
- Correct as of 22 June 2026
Medal record
Men's rugby union
Representing South Africa
World Rugby U20 Championship
Gold medal – first place	2025 Italy	Squad

Riley Norton (born 2 January 2006) is a South African rugby union player who plays as a lock for the Stormers. He currently captains the South Africa Under-20 side.

== Early life and education ==
Norton was born in Stellenbosch, South Africa, and educated at Paul Roos Gimnasium, a school in Stellenbosch. He played for the school’s First Team and was selected for the Craven Week tournament in both 2023 and 2024, representing Western Province U18 at South Africa’s premier schools rugby competition. He later represented SA Schools U18 in both years, marking his progression through the national age group system.

After completing his schooling, Norton started at Stellenbosch University, where he was part of the Maties setup in the Varsity Cup while continuing his development within the Western Province rugby structures.

== Rugby career ==
=== South Africa U20 ===
Riley was called up to the Junior Springboks squad in 2025 and later went on to lead his team to a World Rugby Under 20 Championship title.

Riley was selected as the Junior Springboks captain in 2026 and featured in the U20 Rugby Championship hosted at the Nelson Mandela Bay in South Africa.

=== South Africa ===
Riley Norton was called up to represent the Springboks for their opening match of 2026, scoring a try on debut against the Barbarians. He was subsequently included in the Springboks’ squad for the 2026 Nations Championship, becoming one of the few Under-20 players to retain his place in the senior national setup.

=== Club career ===
Riley came through the Western Province system, representing the province’s side at under-21 level and then further in age-group competitions. He was selected as part of the senior professional setup for the Stormers during their 2025–26 United Rugby Championship season.

== Cricket career ==
Riley began his sporting career as a "promising cricketer", representing South Africa at under‑19 level as a fast‑bowling all‑rounder. He featured in the 2024 Under-19 Cricket World Cup, where he emerged as one of the team’s leading all‑round performers.

Across the tournament, he played eight Youth One‑Day Internationals, scoring 116 runs at an average of 38.67 and taking 13 wickets, with best bowling figures of 4/28 against Sri Lanka.

During the World Cup, Riley was particularly effective with the ball, finishing among South Africa’s leading wicket‑takers and contributing key performances in matches that helped the team reach the latter stages of the competition. His ability to contribute in both disciplines marked him out as one of the most promising young all‑rounders in the country.

At school level, Norton achieved the rare distinction of earning South African Schools honours in both cricket and rugby, having captained his first team at Paul Roos Gymnasium while also excelling as an aggressive fast bowler and lower‑order batsman.

Following the 2024 Under‑19 World Cup, Norton opted to focus on rugby, stepping away from competitive cricket despite his strong potential in the sport.
