= Western Province =

Western Province or West Province may refer to:

- Western Province, Cameroon
- Western Province, Rwanda
- Western Province (Kenya)
- Western Province (Papua New Guinea)
- Western Province (Solomon Islands)
- Western Province, Sri Lanka
- Western Province, Zambia
- Western Province (Victoria), a division of the Victorian Legislative Council
- West Kazakhstan Province
- Western Cape Province, South Africa
  - Western Province (rugby union), a provincial rugby team in the Cape Town region
  - Western Province Cricket Association, the governing body for cricket in the Cape Town region, or its representative team
    - Western Province cricket team
  - Western Province Ice Hockey Association, is a non-profit organization and member branch of South African Ice Hockey Federation
  - Western Province Hockey Union, is the a provincial body for field hockey
- West Province (Western Australia), an electoral province of the Western Australian Legislative Council
- Western Oblast, Russia
- Western Oblast (1917-1918), Russia
- Hejaz in Saudi Arabia

== See also ==
- Western Boyacá Province, Boyacá, Colombia
- Western Savanna Province, Cundinamarca, Colombia
- Gharbia Governorate in Egypt
- West Bengal, a state in eastern India, the western part of the Bengal region
