= Eli Oudenryn =

New Zealand rugby union player

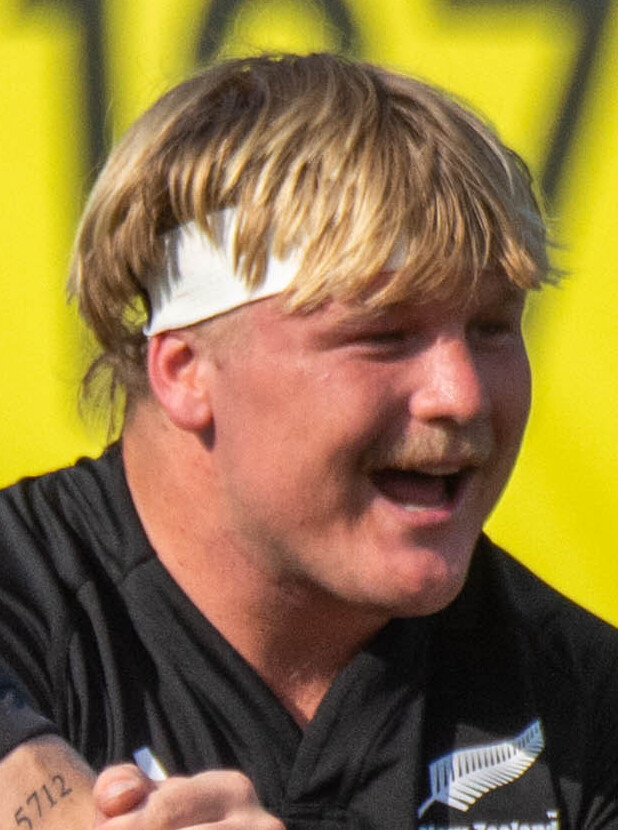
- Oudenryn at the 2025 World Rugby U20 Championship in Italy
- Born: 5 November 2005 (age 21) New Zealand
- Height: 183 cm (6 ft 0 in)
- Weight: 108 kg (238 lb; 17 st 0 lb)
- School: Palmerston North Boys' High School
- Notable relative: Lee Oudenryn (father)

Rugby union career
- Position: Hooker
- Current team: Blues, Tasman
Senior career
Years	Team	Apps	(Points)
2024–	Tasman	20	(35)
2026–	Blues	3	(10)
- Correct as of 9 October 2026
International career
Years	Team	Apps	(Points)
2025	New Zealand U20	6	(10)
- Correct as of 9 October 2026

Eli Oudenryn (born 5 November 2005) is a New Zealand rugby union player, who plays for the Blues and Tasman. His position is hooker.

== Early career ==
Oudenryn attended Palmerston North Boys' High School where he played for the first XV and earned selection for the New Zealand Schools Barbarians in 2023. Having left school, he joined up with the Crusaders academy while playing club rugby for Stoke in the Tasman region. In 2025, he was named in the Crusaders U20 squad, winning U20 Super Rugby player of the season. He earned selection for the New Zealand U20 side in 2025. He is the son of former Australian rugby league player Lee Oudenryn.

== Professional career ==
Oudenryn has represented Tasman in the National Provincial Championship since 2024, being named in the squad for the 2025 Bunnings NPC. He was named in the Blues wider training group for the 2026 Super Rugby Pacific season.
