= Katikati College =

Location
- Beach Road, Katikati; 37.5534°S 175.9220°E

Information
- Type: Co-ed state secondary, year 7–13
- Motto: Ever trying, ever onwards
- Established: 1966
- Ministry of Education Institution no.: 117
- Principal: Louise Buckley
- Enrolment: 839 (July 2026)
- Socio-economic decile: 6N
- Website: www.katikaticollege.school.nz

Katikati College is a co-educational Year 7 to 13 school. It is located in the town of Katikati which is approximately 35 km (22 mi) northwest of the city of Tauranga in the Western Bay of Plenty region of New Zealand.

== Enrolment ==
As of July 2026, Katikati College has roll of 839 students, of which 214 (25.5%) identify as Māori.

As of 2026, the school has an Equity Index of 465, placing it amongst schools whose students have average socioeconomic barriers to achievement (roughly equivalent to deciles 5 and 6 under the former socio-economic decile system).

== Principals ==
- 1935: Mr. S. M. Kemp
- 1966–1976: Mr. R. Greaves
- 1977–1981: Mr. Lind
- 1982–1999: Mr. Brian Blackstock
- 2000–2009: Mr. Peter Leggat
- 2010–2017: Mr. Neil Harray
- 2017–2021: Mrs. Carolyn Pentecost
- 2021: Mrs. Louise Buckley (Acting)

== Houses ==
Katikati College has eight houses,(4 current,4 old) all of old are named after prominent Katikati families and all the new are named after Maori environment landscapes (Current houses erected by principle Louise Buckley at the start of 2026.)

=== Old ===
- Mulgan (red) — named after William Edward Mulgan
- Stewart (blue) — named after George Vesey Stewart
- Macmillan (green) — named after Donald Theodore Macmillan
- Gledstanes (purple) — named after Edward Gledstanes

=== New ===
- Maunga (red) — mountain
- Moana (blue) — sea
- Awa (green) — river
- Tātahi (yellow) — beach

== Notable alumni ==
- Mabel Wharekawa-Burt, television and film actress
- Toby Hendy, science communicator and YouTuber
- Ben O'Leary, musician and guitarist with NZ band Drax Project
- Aisake Vakasiuola, rugby union player for the Chiefs
