= Lee Oudenryn =

Australian rugby league footballer

Personal information
- Full name: Lee Oudenryn
- Born: 8 February 1970 (age 56) Wee Waa, New South Wales, Australia

Playing information
- Height: 187 cm (6 ft 2 in)
- Weight: 90 kg (14 st 2 lb)
- Position: Wing
Club
Years	Team	Pld	T	G	FG	P
1992–95	Parramatta Eels	50	18	37	0	146
1996	Gold Coast Chargers	18	8	3	0	38
1997–00	Auckland Warriors	61	23	1	0	94
2001	North Qld Cowboys	3	0	0	0	0
	Total	132	49	41	0	278

Lee Oudenryn (born 8 February 1970) is an Australian former professional rugby league footballer who played in the 1990s and 2000s. His outstanding speed saw him play mostly on the wing, though he also played a few games at fullback.

== Background ==
Oudenryn was born in Wee Waa, New South Wales.

== Playing career ==
A former junior soccer player, Oudenryn switched to rugby league in the early 1990s and made his first grade début on the wing for the Parramatta Eels in 1992 against Eastern Suburbs at the Sydney Football Stadium. He went on to play 19 games and score 8 tries in his debut season.

A noted speedster, Oudenryn gained a reputation as the fastest player in rugby league when he defeated Great Britain winger Martin Offiah, generally regarded at the time to be the fastest player, by half a metre in a 100-metre sprint race prior to the Parramatta vs Great Britain match played at Parramatta Stadium during the 1992 Great Britain Lions tour of Australasia (which Parramatta won 22–16).

Oudenryn's standing as the fastest player in rugby league took a big hit at the Rugby League Sprint race held during the Botany Bay Gift in March 1993. Over 75 metres, Oudenryn could only finish in 3rd place behind winner Brett Dallas and second placed John Minto.

After spending four seasons at Parramatta where he scored 146 points (18 tries, 37 goals) in 50 games, he signed to play with the Gold Coast Chargers in 1996. After a single season with the Chargers, Oudenryn moved to play with the Auckland Warriors in the 1997 Super League season, and stayed with the club until the end of the 2000 NRL season.

Oudenryn then signed with the North Queensland Cowboys, spending 2001 in Townsville before retiring at the end of the season at age 31.

== Later years ==
After retiring from playing, Oudenryn returned to New Zealand where he became a member of the New Zealand Police. In 2011 he returned to Australia, becoming a detective in the New South Wales Police Force.

Oudenryn's son Eli Oudenryn, who attended Palmerston North Boys' High School, has played for the New Zealand national under-20 rugby union team,Tasman Makos and Blues (Super Rugby).
