= Stanley Solomon =

New Zealand rugby union player

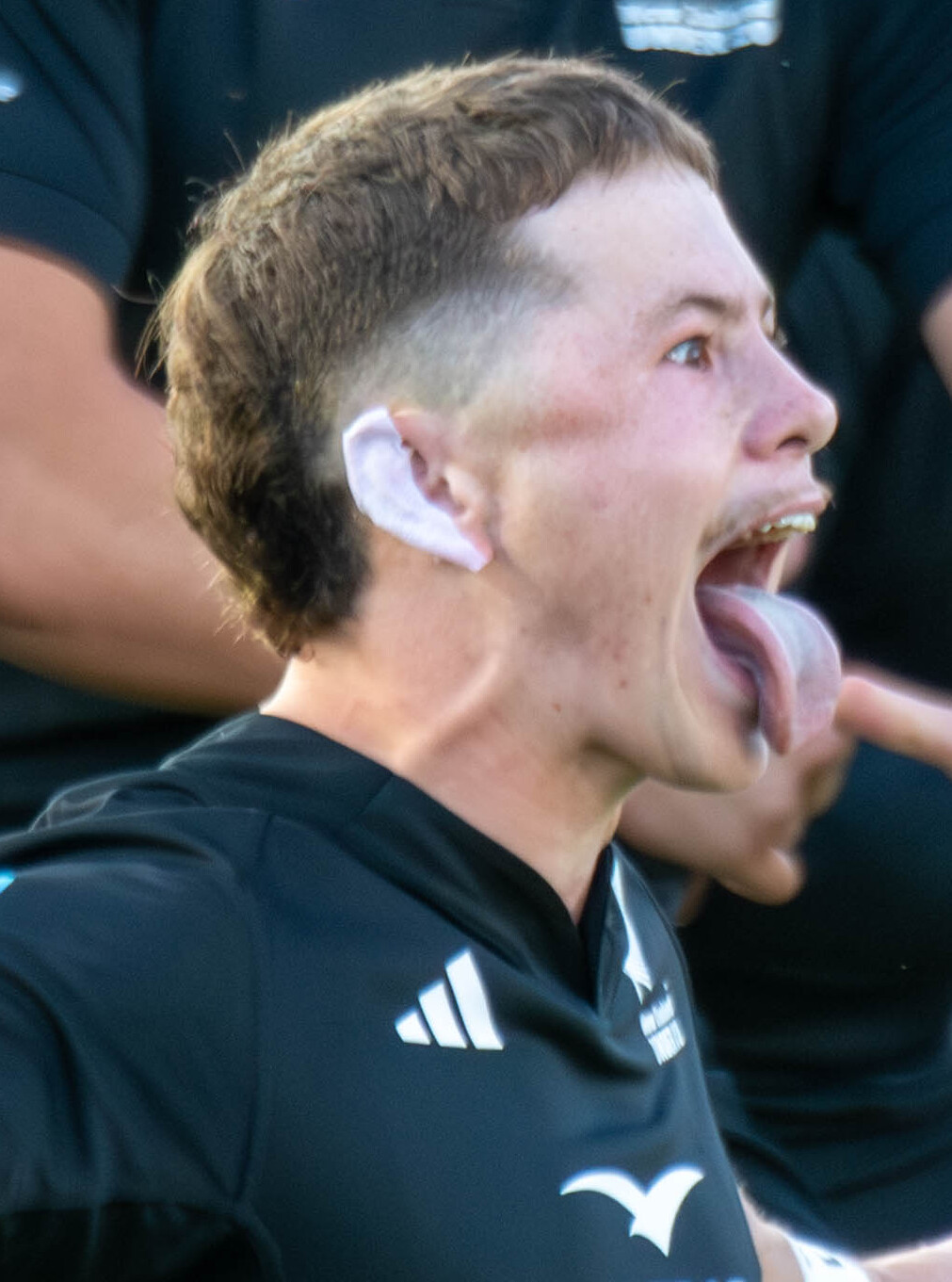
- Solomon performing the Haka during the 2025 World Rugby U20 Championship
- Born: 5 April 2005 (age 21) Wellington, New Zealand
- Height: 174 cm (5 ft 9 in)
- Weight: 80 kg (176 lb; 12 st 8 lb)
- School: Wellington College
- Notable relative: Erin Rush (mother)

Rugby union career
- Position: Wing / Fullback
- Current team: Highlanders, Wellington
Senior career
Years	Team	Apps	(Points)
2024–	Wellington	18	(45)
2026–	Highlanders		
- Correct as of 9 November 2025
International career
Years	Team	Apps	(Points)
2024–2025	New Zealand U20	12	(37)
- Correct as of 9 November 2025

Stanley Solomon (born 5 April 2005) is a New Zealand rugby union player, who plays for the Highlanders and Wellington. His preferred position is wing or fullback.

== Early career ==
Solomon was born in Wellington and attended Wellington College where he played rugby. He earned selection for New Zealand Schools in 2022, and played for the Hurricanes U20 side in 2024. His performances earned him selection for the New Zealand U20 side in 2024 and 2025. He is the son of former New Zealand Women's player Erin Rush.

== Professional career ==
Solomon has represented Wellington in the National Provincial Championship since 2024, being named in the squad for the 2025 Bunnings NPC. He was named in the Highlanders squad for the 2026 Super Rugby Pacific season.
