= Maloni Kunawave =

New Zealand rugby player (born 2000)

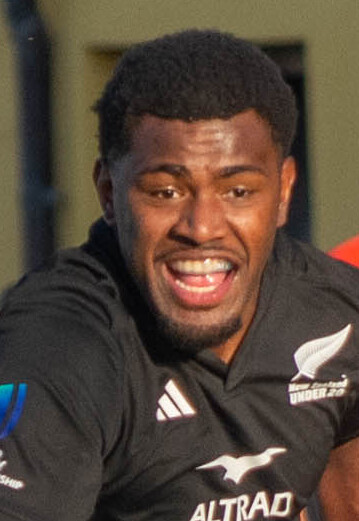
- Kunawave at the U20 World Rugby Championship in 2025
- Born: 22 February 2005 (age 21) Fiji
- Height: 1.86 m (6 ft 1 in)
- Weight: 85 kg (187 lb)

Rugby union career
- Position(s): Centre, Wing, Fullback
- Current team: Crusaders, Tasman
Senior career
Years	Team	Apps	(Points)
2025–	Tasman	13	(37)
2026–	Crusaders	1	(0)
International career
Years	Team	Apps	(Points)
2025	New Zealand U20	7	(10)
National sevens team
Years	Team		Comps
2025–	New Zealand 7s		

Maloni Kunawave (born 22 February 2005) is a New Zealand rugby union player. Born in Fiji, he plays as an outside back for Super Rugby side the Crusaders and previously featured for the New Zealand national rugby sevens team. He also plays for Tasman in the Bunnings NPC.

== Early life ==
Born in Fiji, he completed his primary school education in Fiji prior to moving to New Zealand after receiving a scholarship offer. He has family in Dravuni, Tailevu.

== Career ==
In January 2025, he played for the New Zealand Sevens development team which competed at the Coral Coast 7s in Sigatoka. Shortly afterwards, he made his senior debut for the New Zealand national rugby sevens team in the 2024-25 SVNS in Perth, Australia.

In May 2025, he scored two tries in the final as the New Zealand national under-20 rugby union team won the under-20 Rugby Championship. He then played for New Zealand U20 as they reached the final of the 2025 World Rugby U20 Championship in July, scoring a try in the final in a 23-15 defeat.

Ahead of the 2026 season, he signed for Super Rugby side Crusaders.
