= Harlyn Saunoa =

New Zealand rugby union player

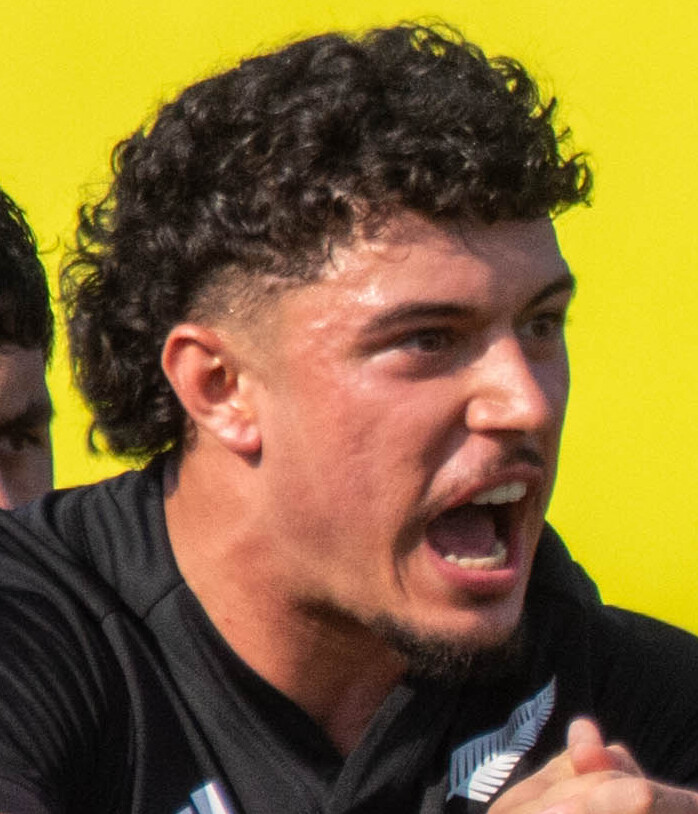
- Harlyn Saunoa at the 2025 World Rugby U20 Championship in Italy
- Born: 19 May 2005 (age 21) Levin, New Zealand
- Height: 190 cm (6 ft 3 in)
- Weight: 102 kg (225 lb; 16 st 1 lb)
- School: Botany Downs Secondary College

Rugby union career
- Position: Wing
- Current team: Blues, North Harbour
Senior career
Years	Team	Apps	(Points)
2025–	Auckland	0	(0)
2025–	North Harbour	5	(0)
2026–	Blues		
- Correct as of 11 November 2025
International career
Years	Team	Apps	(Points)
2025	New Zealand U20	5	(30)
- Correct as of 11 November 2025

Harlyn Saunoa (born 19 May 2005) is a New Zealand rugby union player, who plays for the Blues and North Harbour. His preferred position is wing.

== Early career ==
Saunoa was born in Levin and attended Botany Downs Secondary College where he played rugby for the first XV, and was head boy. After leaving school, he joined up with the Blues academy, representing their U18 side in 2023, and U20 side in 2025. Also in 2025, he represented the New Zealand U20 side.

== Professional career ==
Saunoa has represented Auckland in the National Provincial Championship since 2025, being named in the squad for the 2025 Bunnings NPC, however he spent part of the season on loan at North Harbour making 5 appearances. He was named in the Blues wider training group for the 2026 Super Rugby Pacific season.
