= Batho Hlekani =

South African rugby union player

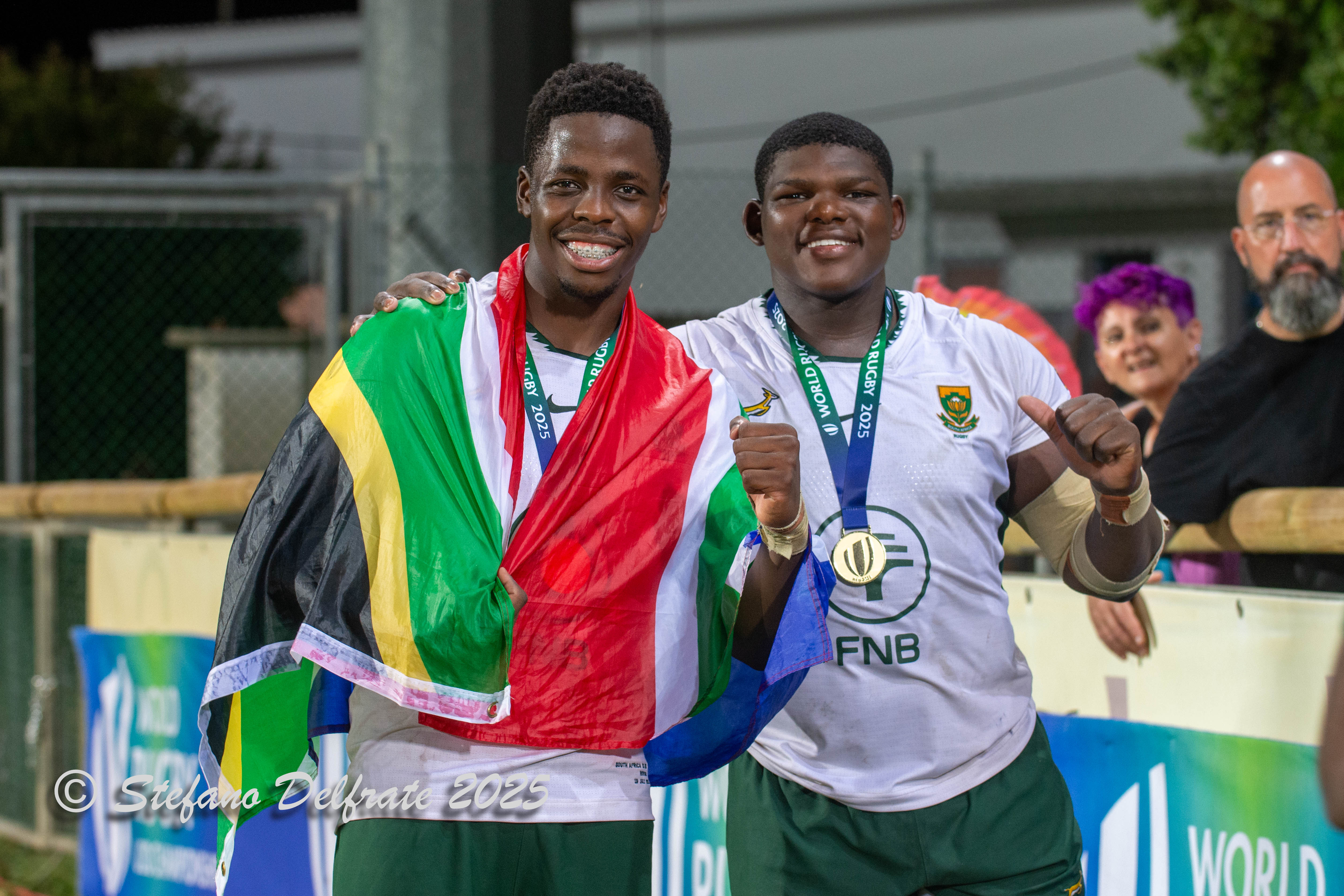
- Hlekani (right) celebrating after winning the 2025 World Rugby U20 Championship title
- Full name: Bathobele Hlekani
- Born: 5 April 2005 (age 21) Zwide, South Africa
- Height: 193 cm (6 ft 4 in)
- Weight: 115 kg (254 lb; 18 st 2 lb)
- School: Graeme College

Rugby union career
- Position: Lock / Flanker
- Current team: Lions
Youth career
- 2022-2023: Eastern Province U18
Senior career
Years	Team	Apps	(Points)
2023–2025	Sharks (Currie Cup)		
2025	Sharks	4	(0)
2026-	Lions	17	(10)
- Correct as of 29 October 2026
International career
Years	Team	Apps	(Points)
2023	South Africa U18	2	(0)
2024–2025	South Africa U20	16	(15)
2026-	South Africa 'A	1	(0)
- Correct as of 22 June 2026
Medal record
Men's rugby union
Representing South Africa
World Rugby U20 Championship
Gold medal – first place	2025 Italy	Squad

Batho Hlekani (born 5 April 2005) is a South African rugby union player, who plays for the Lions. His preferred position is lock or flanker.

== Early career ==
Hlekani is from the township of Zwide in Ibhayi, the same township as South Africa captain Siya Kolisi, and first attended Ndzondelelo High School before moving to Graeme College. His performances for the school earned him selection for the South Africa U20 side in 2024 and 2025.

== Professional career ==
Hlekani came through the Sharks system, representing their U21 side. He made his Currie Cup debut for the Sharks in 2024 and represented the side again in 2025. He made his debut for the Sharks in the 2024–25 EPCR Challenge Cup. He will join the Lions in 2026.

He made his debut for the Lions on 10 January 2026, and received player of the match award.
