= Brett Dallas =

Australian rugby league footballer

Personal information
- Born: 18 October 1974 (age 52) Mackay, Queensland, Australia

Playing information
- Height: 175 cm (5 ft 9 in)
- Weight: 85 kg (13 st 5 lb)
- Position: Wing
Club
Years	Team	Pld	T	G	FG	P
1992–95	Canterbury Bulldogs	43	18	0	0	72
1996–99	North Sydney Bears	76	46	0	0	184
2000–06	Wigan Warriors	177	107	0	0	428
	Total	296	171	0	0	684
Representative
Years	Team	Pld	T	G	FG	P
1993–97	Queensland	10	4	0	0	16
1995–97	Australia	5	9	0	0	36

Brett Dallas (born 18 October 1974) is an Australian former rugby league footballer who played as a winger in the 1990s and 2000s.

An Australian international and Queensland State of Origin representative winger, his club career included stints with both the Canterbury-Bankstown Bulldogs and the North Sydney Bears in Australia's domestic competition, and the Wigan Warriors in the Super League. He was notable for his great speed, winning the Sydney rugby league sprint in 1993.

== Australia ==
Dallas began his career at the Canterbury-Bankstown Bulldogs in 1992, and was at the club until 1995 when he transferred to North Sydney. Dallas was in the Canterbury squad which won the 1995 premiership but missed the grand final due to a leg injury suffered a week earlier.

At Norths he made 76 appearances, scoring 46 tries. Dallas played 4 good years at North Sydney and was part of the side that made consecutive preliminary finals in 1996 & 1997. He left North Sydney to join Wigan when the Bears merged with local rivals Manly-Warringah to form the short-lived Northern Eagles.

Dallas made 10 appearances for Queensland in State of Origin (1993–1997). He made his international début for Australia against New Zealand in 1995, scoring two tries. In total he made six Test appearances, including four matches in the World Cup (which Australia won) and has scored nine tries. His most recent Test appearance was in 1997.

In March 1993, Dallas confirmed his standing as one of the fastest players in the Sydney premiership when he won the A$15,000 Rugby League Sprint race at the NSW Athletic League's Botany Bay Gift. Over 75 metres, Dallas defeated South Sydney winger John Minto and the man at the time considered the fastest player in the game, Parramatta flyer Lee Oudenryn. Humble in victory, Dallas confessed that the shorter distance helped him and he felt either Minto and Oudenryn would have won had the race been held over 100 metres.

== England ==
Dallas made his Wigan début against Salford in a pre-season friendly. He had to wait until the fourth round of the Challenge Cup to score his first try for the club in a 98–4 victory over Whitehaven Warriors.

Dallas was out of action for 10 weeks in 2000 after sustaining a broken jaw sustained in an away victory against Bradford Bulls. At the time he was Wigan's leading try-scorer with 17. He made a try-scoring return to first team action in the last match of the regular season at St. Helens, in a 42–4 victory that secured Wigan the 2000 Minor Premiership. He finished the season with a total of 20 tries behind only fellow Aussie Steve Renouf and Kris Radlinski. Dallas played for the Wigan Warriors on the wing in their 2000 Super League Grand Final loss against St Helens R.F.C.

Dallas played for the Wigan Warriors on the wing in their 2001 Super League Grand Final loss against the Bradford Bulls.

Dallas again missed the end of the 2002 Super League season with a knee injury requiring a full reconstruction operation in Australia. Whilst he was at home with his family he took the opportunity to get married.

He returned to the club in 2003 but again succumbed to a hamstring injury, and was linked with Australian club Cronulla Sharks. However, Dallas was determined to win back his place in the Wigan side and declined the deal. His decision was fully justified, as he returned to form in the latter half of the season and played for the Wigan Warriors on the wing in the 2003 Super League Grand Final which was lost to the Bradford Bulls. In the process however he'd earned a new contract. Dallas' good form continued into 2004, earning himself a new two-year contract which makes him one of the club's longest serving overseas players.

Dallas played his final game in Wigan colours on 15 September 2006 against Hull F.C. after 14 years in rugby league which included a Rugby League Challenge Cup win with the Wigan Warriors in 2002. Dallas wanted to score a try in his final game for Wigan but was unable to do, so instead took the final conversion kick at goal. His kick, however, just missed. At the end of the game, his final act in Wigan colours was to leave his boots in the centre of the field as he was applauded by Wigan spectators all over the stadium. It was regarded as a fitting tribute to the supporters of Dallas over the years and an emotional final night of action from the flying Aussie winger. There were rumours that Dallas would return to Australia to play in the NRL but, in a speech to the Wigan fans after his final game, he said that he has no plans for the near future apart from enjoying his retirement.

== Controversy ==
In 2019, he pleaded guilty to three charges including the theft of a coffee table, worth around £360, from a furniture franchise.

On 8 January 2021, Dallas was ordered to appear in court charged with multiple offences including aggravated possession of ice, supplying ice, producing marijuana, possessing ketamine as well as weapons charges. Dallas had already been in police custody for six months.
