= Hentie Martens =

South African rugby union player

- Born: Hendrik Jacobus Martens; 29 October 1971 (age 55) Pietermaritzburg, KwaZulu-Natal
- Height: 1.79 m (5 ft 10 in)
- Weight: 80 kg (176 lb)
- School: Hilton College
- University: University of the Free State

Rugby union career
Senior career
| Years | Team | Apps | (Points) |
| 2001–2003 | London Irish | 16 | (5) |
| 2003–2004 | Bath | 8 | |
Provincial / State sides
| Years | Team | Apps | (Points) |
| 1991–1995 | Free State | 57 | (23) |
| 1995–2001 | Natal | 45 | (50) |
Super Rugby
| Years | Team | Apps | (Points) |
| 1998–2001 | Coastal Sharks | 21 | (15) |
International career
| Years | Team | Apps | (Points) |
| 1993 | South Africa (tour) | 3 | (5) |

Hendrik Jacobus "Hentie" Martens (born 29 October 1971) is a South African former rugby union player.

== Playing career ==
Martens represented Natal at the 1990 Craven Week tournament for schoolboys and was selected for the South African Schools team in 1990. He made his provincial debut for Free State in 1991 and also played for the South African under–23 team in 1994. In 1995 he joined Natal, playing provincial rugby and super rugby for the Coastal Sharks. At the end of the 1993 season, he toured with the Springboks to Argentina. Martens did not play in any test matches but played in three tour matches, scoring one try for the Springboks.

== See also ==
- List of South Africa national rugby union players – Springbok no. 598
- List of South Africa national under-18 rugby union team players
