= New Zealand Rugby =

Rugby union governing body

- Sport: Rugby union
- Founded: 1892
- World Rugby affiliation: 1949
- Oceania affiliation: 2000
- President: Erin Rush
- CEO: Steve Lancaster
- Men's coach: Dave Rennie
- Women's coach: Whitney Hansen
- Sevens coach: Men's: vacant Women's: Cory Sweeney
- Website: nzrugby.co.nz

New Zealand Rugby (NZR) is the governing body of rugby union in New Zealand. It was founded in 1892 as the New Zealand Rugby Football Union (NZRFU), 12 years after the first provincial unions in New Zealand. In 1949 it became an affiliate to the International Rugby Football Board, now known as World Rugby, the governing body of rugby union for the world. It dropped the word "Football" from its name in 2006. The brand name New Zealand Rugby was adopted in 2013. Officially, it is an incorporated society with the name New Zealand Rugby Union Incorporated.

The organisation's main objectives, as displayed in the NZR Constitution, are to promote and develop rugby throughout New Zealand; arrange and participate in matches and tours in New Zealand and overseas; represent New Zealand in World Rugby; form and manage New Zealand representative teams; and encourage participation in the sport. NZR headquarters are located in Wellington, New Zealand, with an office in Auckland.

== Structure ==
New Zealand Rugby has a staff of approximately 90 people, mostly based in Wellington and Auckland but also working in locations all around New Zealand.

NZR was initially governed by a committee of delegates from the provincial unions until replaced in 1894 by a seven-member Wellington-based management committee. Administrative responsibilities were initially held by honorary secretaries, and then secretaries, from 1907. This was expanded 43 years later to create two entities, the ruling NZRU Council and an executive committee. In 1986, three geographical zones were formed to elect the members of the ruling council, and the executive committee was replaced by an administration committee. Since 1990, the NZRU has been managed by a CEO.

In 1996, the NZRU's ruling council was replaced by an expanded board to include independent members and an elected Maori representative. In 2015, the geographical zones were abolished so that vacant elective seats on the board could be contested by nominees from any provincial union in New Zealand without restriction on place of residence.

Patron Ian Kirkpatrick
Officers Erin Rush^{President} David Latta^{Vice President}
Board David Kirk^{Chairman} Greg Barclay^{Board Member} Grant Jarrold^{Board Member} Marise James^{Board Member} Doug Jones^{Board Member} Keven Mealamu^{Board Member} Caren Rangi^{Board Member} Julia Raue^{Board Member} Catherine Savage^{Board Member}	Executive Steve Lancaster^{Chief Executive Officer} Chris Brown^{Chief Commercial Officer} Toni Grimshaw^{Chief People Safety & Wellbeing Officer} Chris Kinraid^{Chief Finance Officer} Paul Stevens^{Chief Communications Officer} Tom Turton^{General Counsel} Michael Collins^{Chief Rugby Officer (starting September 2026)} Don Tricker^{High Performance Director} vacant^{Kaihautū Māori}^{Updated: 22 July 2026}
Sources: NZRU

=== Patron and officers ===
New Zealand Rugby's Patron fills an honorary role as the figurehead for the organisation. The position of Patron is currently vacant following the death of Sir Brian Lochore in August 2019.

The President and Vice President are the Union's two officers who represent New Zealand Rugby at functions and events. Unlike the Patron, the President and Vice President may attend board meetings of New Zealand Rugby, although they are not entitled to vote on board matters. The President and Vice President are elected for two years each. The current President is Bill Osborne and the current Vice President is Max Spence.

=== Board ===
The Board is charged with setting strategy, direction and policy for the New Zealand Rugby Union, and is ultimately responsible for the decisions and actions of NZRU management and staff. Many of the decisions concerning New Zealand's national teams, domestic competitions, financial management and rugby traditions are made by the Board.

As of September 2018, the Board has nine members: six elected members (including one Maori representative) and three independent members. Any provincial union in New Zealand may nominate candidates for vacant elective positions. Nominations are passed to an Appointments and Remuneration Committee (ARC) which recommends two candidates per vacancy, to be voted on by delegates at the Annual General Meeting. The Maori representative is automatically appointed as New Zealand Rugby's representative on and Chairman of the New Zealand Maori Rugby Board.

The independent board members must be independent of any provincial union and are not nominated for the role. Instead, independent members must apply for the position and are selected on the basis of their professional qualifications and experience by a committee from the Board of New Zealand Rugby.

=== Executive management team and staff ===
New Zealand Rugby's management and staff reports to an executive team headed by the Chief Executive Officer. This team includes various managers for all aspects of New Zealand Rugby ranging from community and provincial rugby to the All Blacks teams. The Chief Executive Officer (CEO), working with the Board, is responsible for the establishment of the vision and strategy for the organisation, and acts as the key link between the Board and the staff. The CEO is ultimately responsible for the administrative and operational aspects of New Zealand Rugby. The current CEO is Mark Robinson, who took up the post in January 2020, succeeding Steve Tew.

== History ==
The New Zealand Rugby Union (NZRU) was formed in 1892 to administer the game of rugby union at the national level. At that time, the national union was known as the New Zealand Rugby Football Union or NZRFU. The name was officially shortened in 2006 with the removal of the word "Football". The brand name New Zealand Rugby was adopted in 2013 for "everyday" use because it was seen as less "stuffy" and the word "Union" had some negative connotations.

The first rugby match to be played in New Zealand took place in Nelson in May 1870, between Nelson College and Nelson Football Club. The game spread quickly and in September 1875 the first interprovincial match took place in Dunedin, between Auckland Clubs and Dunedin Clubs. In 1879, the first provincial unions were formed in Canterbury and Wellington.

=== Formation and early years ===
Ernest Hoben
The NZRU's strongest advocate and first secretary, Ernest Hoben, was a driving force behind the formation of the national union. In recognition of Hoben's contribution, the "Ernest Hoben Room" at the NZRU's offices in Wellington now displays all 26 provincial jerseys alongside photos of past All Blacks teams and the names of every All Black in New Zealand rugby history.

On Saturday 16 April 1892, in a meeting held in Wellington, the New Zealand Rugby Union was formed. Inaugural members were the provincial unions of Auckland, Hawke's Bay, Manawatu, Marlborough, Nelson, South Canterbury, Taranaki, Waiararapa, Wanganui and Wellington. At the time, three major South Island provincial unions – Canterbury, Otago and Southland – resisted the central authority of the NZRU.

In 1893, the NZRU formally adopted the black jersey as the national playing strip and selected the first NZRU-sanctioned national team, for a tour of Australia. However, the earlier New Zealand team selected to tour New South Wales in 1884 is recognised as a New Zealand team and its players recognised as All Blacks.

By 1895, with the additions of the Bush, Canterbury, Horowhenua, Otago, Poverty Bay, Southland and West Coast unions, the NZRU was considered to be a complete and united collection of all New Zealand rugby players. However, the New Zealand rugby map would be repeatedly redrawn in the following decades.

At the Annual Meeting in 1921, the NZRU elected its first Life Member, George Dixon, manager of the 1905 "Originals" All Blacks and the NZRU's first Chairman, appointed in 1904. In another innovation, provincial delegates met prior to the Annual Meeting to arrange representative fixtures for the season ahead, introducing a new level of national coordination.

=== Provincial rugby ===
In 1976, the National Provincial Championship was formed to help organise matches between provincial unions, it had two divisions in its first year of play but the format was repeatedly reorganized throughout its 30-year history, notably in 1992 the bonus points system was brought in to determine the top placed team. Auckland have been the most successful team in the NPC's history with 16 championships including the last in 2005.

At the conclusion of the NPC there were three divisions and 27 unions under the NZRU's jurisdiction, it was replaced by the Air New Zealand Cup and Heartland Championship in 2006 with 14 teams in the top competition, including the new Tasman Makos, who formed with the amalgamation of the Marlborough and Nelson Bays Rugby Unions, and 12 teams in the amateur Heartland Championship. After changes in sponsorship in 2010, 2016 and 2021, the Air New Zealand Cup became the ITM Cup, Mitre 10 Cup and is now the Bunnings NPC.

=== All Blacks ===
The All Blacks are the men's rugby union team of New Zealand. The team has maintained a high ranking in international rugby since the early 20th century. They are recognized internationally for their name and their all-black uniforms.

The first New Zealand team was selected in 1884, for a tour to New South Wales. The team played its first match at home, against a Wellington XV, before recording eight wins in eight matches in Australia. Otago prop James Allan, who played eight matches for the 1884 team, has the title of All Black No 1.

In 1893, the first official NZRU-sanctioned New Zealand team was selected, for an 11-match tour to Australia. The team lost just once, to New South Wales in Sydney.

In 1894, an official New Zealand team hosted visiting opposition on home soil for the first time, in a match against New South Wales at Christchurch won 8–6 by the visitors, two years later, New Zealand beat Queensland at Wellington to record its first home win against visiting opposition.

New Zealand's 1905–06 tour to the United Kingdom, France and North America might be considered the most important in New Zealand rugby history. The team played 35 matches in total, the only team to beat them was Wales. In the United Kingdom especially, the team's largely confident, attractive and comfortable wins made a strong statement about the quality of rugby in the colonies and New Zealand in particular. Moreover, the 1905–06 tour gave rise to the famous "All Blacks" moniker, as the fame surrounding the black-clad team spread. Nowadays, this team is known as "the Originals" – they were the first team to demonstrate the power and skill of New Zealand rugby, the first to make rugby a part of New Zealand's cultural identity, and the first to be known as All Blacks.

In 1924–25, the All Blacks embarked on a 32-match tour to the United Kingdom, France and Canada. Going one better than the 1905–06 Originals, this team won all 32 matches, including Test wins over Ireland, Wales, England and France, and earned the nickname "the Invincibles".

In 1956, the All Blacks won a Test series against South Africa for the first time. The Springboks were the All Blacks' greatest traditional rivals and had delivered some of the All Blacks' worst defeats.

In 1978, the All Blacks achieved a Grand Slam for the first time. For southern hemisphere sides like New Zealand, a Grand Slam includes victories over the four Home Unions – England, Ireland, Scotland and Wales – in the course of a single tour. The team achieved a second Grand Slam in 2005 and a third in 2008

In 1987, the All Blacks won the inaugural Rugby World Cup against France, hosted by New Zealand and Australia. New Zealand also won the Rugby World Cup in 2011, after an 8–7 victory over France in front of a home crowd, and in 34–17 victory over Australia at Twickenham in 2015. The latter win made the All Blacks the first side ever to successfully defend a Rugby World Cup title and to win three World Cups.

=== Professional era ===
In 1995, following the Rugby World Cup tournament in South Africa, international rugby turned professional with the IRB's repeal of all amateurism regulations. For the first time, the NZRU negotiated with and contracted New Zealand rugby players.

The NZRU also joined with the national unions of Australia and South Africa to form SANZAR, which sold the television rights for major southern hemisphere rugby competitions and helped to build the commercial foundation on which professional rugby is based. SANZAR, renamed SANZAAR with the 2016 entry of Argentina as a full member of the body, remains an important rugby organisation and organises The Rugby Championship (originally the Tri Nations) and the Super Rugby competition.

== National teams ==
The NZRU has several teams under its control.

=== Men ===
- All Blacks – the national men's rugby union team of New Zealand
- All Blacks XV – the second national team behind the All Blacks and not an age graded side.
- Sevens – the national rugby sevens team of New Zealand. Established in 1983, when the first full international side was sent to the Hong Kong Sevens tournament.
- Māori All Blacks – the national men's Māori team of New Zealand. Members of this team must have at least 1/16 Māori ancestry (equivalent to one great-great-grandparent).
- Under 20s – an age graded side created after World Rugby (then known as the IRB) folded its former under-19 and under-21 World Championships into an under-20 competition currently known as the World Rugby Under 20 Championship. Currently the country's top age-grade side, and also sometimes referred to as the "Baby Blacks."
- Heartland XV – established in 1988 to expose players from Divisions Two and Three in the Air New Zealand NPC to rugby at a higher level. After the 2006 reorganisation of the NPC into the fully professional Air New Zealand Cup, now Mitre 10 Cup, and the nominally amateur Heartland Championship, the team is now composed solely of players from the Heartland Championship.
- NZ Schools – a development team of school players who move up to the Under 20s and ultimately the All Blacks.
- New Zealand U85kg – a team of players selected from the regional and national under 85kg competition. All players must have an individual maximum weight of 85 kilograms. Established in May 2025, when a team was sent for a two game tour in Sri Lanka versus the Sri Lankan national rugby team.

=== Women ===
- Black Ferns – the national women's rugby union team of New Zealand.
- Sevens – the national women's rugby sevens team of New Zealand.

=== Referees ===
The New Zealand Rugby Union have a number of contracted referees who officiated in levels from Heartland matches to ITM Cup and Super Rugby. The system in which referees are selected, appointed to matches and progress through to the next stage is very structured with a number of referee coaches, viewers and managers assisting them with their performances. However, only 5 referees are on professional contracts, Glen Jackson, Brendon Pickerill, Ben O'Keeffe, Paul Williams, Nick Briant and Mike Fraser. The professionals are appointed to refereeing Super Rugby matches by SANZAAR with some refereeing test rugby.

== Provincial unions ==
The NZRU comprises 17 North Island provincial unions and 9 South Island provincial unions.

=== North Island ===
The North Island provincial unions are:

- Auckland
- Bay of Plenty
- Counties-Manukau
- East Coast
- Hawke's Bay
- Horowhenua-Kapiti
- King Country
- Manawatu
- North Harbour
- Northland
- Poverty Bay
- Taranaki
- Thames Valley
- Waikato
- Wairarapa Bush
- Wanganui
- Wellington

=== South Island ===
The South Island provincial unions are:

- Buller
- Canterbury
- Mid-Canterbury
- North Otago
- Otago
- South Canterbury
- Southland
- Tasman
- West Coast

== See also ==
- List of New Zealand rugby union teams
- New Zealand Rugby Museum
