= Will Cole =

New Zealand rugby union player

- Born: 1 July 2005 (age 21) Melbourne, Australia
- Height: 183 cm (6 ft 0 in)
- Weight: 84 kg (185 lb; 13 st 3 lb)
- School: Rathkeale College

Rugby union career
- Position: First five-eighth / Fullback
- Current team: Hurricanes / Hawke's Bay
Senior career
Years	Team	Apps	(Points)
2026–	Hurricanes	0	(0)
2026–	Hawke's Bay	9	(16)
- Correct as of 8 November 2026
International career
Years	Team	Apps	(Points)
2025	New Zealand U20	7	(47)
- Correct as of 8 November 2026

Will Cole (born 1 July 2005) is a New Zealand rugby union player, who plays for the Hurricanes. His preferred position is first five-eighth or fullback.

== Early career ==
Cole was born in the Melbourne, Australia, but moved to Wairarapa as a child, attending Rathkeale College. His school performances earned him selection for New Zealand Schools in 2023, and earned him a place in the Hurricanes academy, representing their U20 side in 2025. In 2025, he was named in the New Zealand U20 side. He plays his club rugby for Havelock North.

== Professional career ==
Cole has represented Hawke's Bay in the National Provincial Championship since 2026, being named in their squad for the 2026 Hilux NPC competition. In October 2026, he was named in the Hurricanes wider training group for the 2027 Super Rugby Pacific season. He had previously been named in the Hurricanes wider training group for the 2026 Super Rugby Pacific season.
