= Under-18 International Series =

International rugby union competition

U18 International Series
Tournament details
- Host: South Africa
- Venue: Cape Town, South Africa
- Teams: 8

The Under-18 International Series is an annual international rugby union competition held in South Africa and organised by SA Rugby. The tournament features the South Africa Under-18 (SA Schools) team, a South Africa U18 'A' team, and invited international under-18 representative sides from leading rugby nations. In the 2025 U18 International Series, The South African Schools side "maintained their fine form" after finishing the series unbeaten and winning all 3 of their games. Markus Muller was appointed as the SA Schools captain for the 2025 U18 International Series.

Established in 2012, the series forms part of South Africa’s elite player development pathway and provides international competition for schoolboy players prior to progression to under-20 and senior representative rugby.

== History ==
The competition was first held in 2012 as a structured international tournament for school-level players, replacing the traditional standalone fixtures previously played by South African Schools teams against touring sides.

During the 2024 U18 International Series, the French national U18 team had to withdraw from the tournament following the disappearance of one of their players, after a "17 year old player who was affiliated to Toulouse" had gone missing.

The tournament is typically staged annually in August following the conclusion of Craven Week, South Africa’s premier schoolboy rugby tournament, from which the SA U18 and SA U18 'A' squads are selected.

Since its inception, the series has featured visiting teams from countries including England, France, Ireland, Wales, and Georgia. 2025 was the "second successive year" in which the Ireland U18 rugby side competed in.

== Format ==
The Under-18 International Series generally consists of three match rounds played over approximately ten days. Fixtures are commonly hosted at leading school venues in the Western Cape, including Paarl and Stellenberg.

The tournament usually includes:

- South Africa U18 (SA Schools)
- South Africa U18 'A'
- Three to four invited international U18 teams

Matches are typically played as double or triple headers on designated match days. There is no formal knockout stage; standings are determined by match results across the series.

== Development role ==
The competition is regarded as an important step in South Africa’s high-performance pathway. It provides exposure to international opposition and prepares players for selection to the national U20 side that competes in the World Rugby Under 20 Championship.

Several players who have featured in the Under-18 International Series have progressed to represent South Africa at U20 and senior international level.

== Results ==
=== 2026 ===
The results from the 2026 Under-18 International Series were::

7 August 2026
10:30 (SAST)

South Africa 'A U18	32-31	Ireland U18
Try: Els 26' c de Bruin 29' c van Niekerk 56' m Mataboge 59' c Con: Viljoen (3/4) 27', 30', 60'; Pen: Viljoen (1/1) 37'; Pheiffer (1/2) 75'	Report	Try: Smyth 12' c, 61' c Boyle 43' c McCarthy 64' c Con: Nolan (4/4) 13', 44', 62', 65'; Pen: Coffey (1/1) 68'

Durbanville High School, Cape Town, South Africa

7 August 2026
14:30 (SAST)

South Africa U18	59-07	France U18
Try: Mgedezi 9' c, 62' c de Villiers 18' c Kuzoneyl 31' c Kepe 36' c van der Vyver 43' c Doyle 49' c Barker 55' c Simelane 64' m Con: van Biljon (5/5) 10', 19', 32', 37', 44'; Behardien (3/4) 50', 56', 63'	Report	Try: Rous 15' c Con: Trillo (1/1) 16'; Cards: Andrieu (yellow card) 42' x (yellow card) 47'

Durbanville High School, Cape Town, South Africa
Referee: Jack MacNeice

11 August 2026
10:30 (SAST)

South Africa 'A U18	20-00	Georgia U18
Try: Baron 26' m Genis 36' m Schulze 70' c Con: Viljoen (1/2) 61'; Drop: Viljoen (1/1) 35'	Report

Hoër Landbouskool Boland, Paarl, South Africa
Attendance: 5,000+
Referee: Zoe Naude (South Africa)

11 August 2026
14:30 (SAST)

South Africa U18	51-15	Ireland U18
Try: Bosshof 3' c Mgedezi 15’ m Kuzonyei 24’ c de Villiers 29’ m Whitehead 48’ m, 59’ m van der Vyver 65’ c Makelele 68’ c Con: Behardien (2/5) 4', 25’ van Biljon (2/3) 66’, 68’ Pen: van Biljon (1/1) 54'; Cards: Kuzonyei (yellow card) 56'	Report	Try: Moloney 31’ m Coffey 37’ m Woods 69’ m Cards: Smith (yellow card) 66'

Hoër Landbouskool Boland, Paarl, South Africa
Attendance: 5,000+
Referee: Caleb Hibbert (South Africa)

15 August 2026
10:30 (SAST)

South Africa 'A U18	51-26	France U18
Try: Mehlomakulu 6' c Malan 8' c Magau 15' c Viljoen 42' c Saunders 45' c Hendricks 59' m Genis 71' m Con: Viljoen (5/5) 7', 9', 16', 43', 46'; Pen: Viljoen (1/1) 27'; Drop: Viljoen (1/1) 37'; Cards: Prins (yellow card) 64'	Fixtures	Try: Codorniou 20' c Noel 30' c Roudaut 35' c Richerol 67' m Con: Trillon (3/4) 21',31', 35'

Stellenberg High School, Cape Town, South Africa
Attendance: 3,000+

15 August 2026
14:30 (SAST)

South Africa U18	68-40	England U18
Try: Whitehead 13' m Kepe 16' m, 31' c De Villiers 21' c, 63' c Boshoff 42' c, 67' c, 71' c van Biljon 44' c Kuzonyei 49' c Con: van Biljon (3/4) 17', 22', 32'; Behardien (6/6) 43', 45', 50', 64', 68', 72'; Cards: Whitehead (yellow card) 34'	Report	Try: Guyver 9' c Moore 28' c Bray 35' m Elone 54' c Bayston 60' c McIntosh 64' c Con: Jones (1/1) 10'; Talbot (3/4) 28', 60', 65'; Goode (1/1) 55'; Cards: Jones (yellow card) 30'; Allen (yellow card) 67'

Stellenberg High School, Cape Town, South Africa
Attendance: 5,000+
Referee: Jack MacNeice (Irish)

=== 2025 ===
The results from the 2025 Under-18 International Series were:

8 August 2025
11h30

South Africa 'A'	36–39	Ireland
Try: Jeffrey Singo, Reinhart Viljoen(2), Ncutu Kepe, Lizwe Mthethwa; Con: Jeandre Uithaler(4); Pen: Jeandre Uithaler(1)	Report	Try: Lee Fitzpatrick(2), Bernard White(2), Alex Lautsou; Con: Luke Coffey(2), Connor McVicker (2); Pen: Connor McVicker(1)

Hoërskool Durbanville, Cape Town

8 August 2025
15h30

South Africa	43–21	France
Try: Chinedu Amadi(2), Gert Kemp, Markus Muller, Jacobus de Villiers, Junaide Stuart; Con: Liyema Nela(4), Ruben Groenewald; Pen: Liyema Nela(1)	Report	Try: Auguste Albuisson, Christian Mendes Tani(2); Con: Timeo Gillouin-Lemaire(1), Valentin Bouju (2)

Hoërskool Durbanville, Cape Town

12 August 2025
11h30

South Africa 'A'	57–19	Georgia
Try: Thomas Muller, Migael Turner, Ncutu Kepe, Junade Pasensie(2), Quintin Potgieter(2), Erin Nelson, Nathan Aneke; Con: Jeandre Uithaler(6)	Report	Try: Pitskhelauri Gocha, Balanchivadze Nikoloz, Gabriel Razmadze; Con: Butshrikidze Levani(2)

Hoër Landbouskool Boland, Paarl

12 August 2025
11h30

South Africa	45–5	Ireland
Try: Jayden Joubert, Clinton Agu, Jayden Brits, Lamla Mgedezi, Jadrian Afrikaner, Ethan Adams, Penalty try Con: Ruben Groenewald (2), Liyema Nela (2)	Report	Try: Harry Goslin

Hoër Landbouskool Boland, Paarl

16 August 2025
11h30

South Africa 'A'	40–14	France
Try: Thomas Muller, Penalty Try; Con: Jeandre Uithaler(1)	Report	Try: Lourenzo Laouna, Malobe Mbaye, Andoni Echegaray, Gaetan Ngassa Manac’h, Yanis Brosset; Con: Timeo Gillouin Lemaire(1), Louis Favrau(2); Pen: Gillouin-Lemaire(2), Favrau(1)

Paarl Gimnasium, Paarl

16 August 2025
15h30

South Africa	69–24	England
Try: Jadriaan Afrikaner, Gert Kemp, Markus Muller(2), Ethan Adams, Junaide Stuart, JG Badenhorst, Altus Rabe, Josh Neill, Christian Vorster; Con: Liyema Nela(4), Ruben Groenewald(4); Pen: Liyema Nela(1)	Report	Try: Lawrence Ogbonnaya, Henry Horsfall, Declan Treacey; Con: Hugh Shields(1), Oscar Talbot(1); Pen: Hugh Shields(1)

Paarl Gimnasium, Paarl

=== 2024 ===
The results from the 2024 Under-18 International Series were:

12 August 2024

South Africa 'A'	20–03	Georgia
Try: Dylan Miller, Brooklyn Newman; Con: Luan Giliomee(2); Pen: Luan Giliomee(2)	Report	Pen: Gigi Sirbiladze(1)

Stellenberg High School,
Cape Town

12 August 2024

Ireland	42–28	England
Try: Luke McLaughlin, Jack Deegan (2), Josh Gibson, Brian O’Flaherty, Conor O’Shaughnessy; Con: Tom Wood (4), Conor O’Shaughnessy (2)	Report	Try: Noah Caluori, Tom Davis, Victor Worsnip, George Newman; Con: James Linegar (4)

Stellenberg High School,
Cape Town

16 August 2024

South Africa	38–26	Ireland
Try: Markus Muller, Zekhethelo Siyaya(2), Sethu Mnebelele, Cheswill Jooste; Con: Yaqeen Ahmed(3), Akahluwa Boqwana(2); Pen: Vusi Moyo(1)	Report	Try: Conor Magee(2), Jack Deegan, Jamie Conway; Con: Tom Wood(1), Conor O’Shaughnessy (2)

Paarl Gimnasium,
Paarl

16 August 2024

Georgia	20-27	England
Try: Nikolozi Khalvashi, Givi Soselia, Saba Sharvashidze; Con: Levani Butskhrikidze; Pen: Levani Butskhrikidze	Report	Try: Noah Caluori, Reuben Thomas, Fraser Rawlins (2); Con: Finn Keylock (3)

Paarl Gimnasium,
Paarl

20 August 2024

South Africa	39–14	England
Try: Khuthadzo Rasivhaga, Reuben Kruger, Cheswill Jooste(2), Elgernon Meyer; Con: Vusi Moyo(2), Yaqeen Ahmed(2); Pen: Vusi Moyo(2)	Report	Try: George Newman, Connor Treacey; Con: James Linegar(2)

Paarl Gimnasium,
Paarl

20 August 2024

Ireland	17-15	Georgia
Try: Joe Finn, Jack Deegan; Con: Conor O’Shaughnessy (2); Pen: Conor O’Shaughnessy	Report	Try: Anri Shvelidze (2); Con: Gigi Sirbiladze; Pen: Gigi Sirbiladze

Paarl Gimnasium,
Paarl

=== 2023 ===
The results from the 2023 Under-18 International Series were:

15 August 2023

South Africa	24–37	France
Try: Haashim Pead(2), Janco Purchase, Luyanda Kunene; Con: Dominic Malgas(2)	Report	Try: Temanatua Boichot, Charly Mignot, Eliott Duthil, Gabin Garault; Con: Diego Jurd(3), Luka Keletaona; Pen: Diego Jurd(3)

Stellenberg High School,
Durbanville

19 August 2023

South Africa	33–19	England
Try: JC Mars, Gino Cupido, Cheswill Jooste, JJ Theron, Scott Nel; Con: Kyle Smith(4)	Report	Try: Junior Kpoku, Nick Lilley, Toby Baker; Con: Angus Hall(2)

Paarl

=== 2022 ===
The results from the 2022 Under-18 International Series were:

19 August 2022

South Africa 'A'	23–26	France
Try: Smal 13' m, 27' c Con: Koen (1/2) 28'; Pen: Koen (1/1) 59'; Cards: van Niekerk (yellow card) 55'	Report	Try: x 5' c x 34' m x 43' m Con: #13 (1/3) 6'; Pen: #13 (1/2) 55'; Cards: #6 (yellow card) 49' #16 (yellow card) 65'

Paarl Gimnasium, Cape Town, South Africa

19 August 2022

South Africa	40–24	England
Try: Bester 25' c Abrahams 30' c Bakkes 46' c Waterhouse 71' c Con: Heymans (3/3) 26', 31', 47'; Williams (1/1) 72'; Pen: Heymans (4/4) 3', 11', 14', 41'; Cards: Badenhorst (red card) 78'	Report	Try: Bennett 21' c Keasey 50' c, 73' c Con: Taylor (2/2) 22', 51'; Weston (1/1) 74'; Pen: Taylor (1/1) 2'

Paarl Gimnasium, Cape Town, South Africa
Referee: Dylen November

23 August 2022

South Africa 'A'	34–36	England
Try: Tom; Mpaka (2); Cupido; Con: Giddy (4/4); Pen: Giddy (2/2)		Try: Glister; Owen; Sela; Redshaw; Con: Weston (1/2); Taylor (3/3); Pen: Taylor (1/1)

Paarl Gimnasium, Cape Town, South Africa

23 August 2022

South Africa	49–17	France
Try: De Jongh 11' c, 46' c Bester 15' c, 53' c Sherwood 17' m Nel 19' c Con: Williams (5/6) 12', 16' 20', 47', 54'; Pen: Williams (3/3) 6', 40' 43'; Cards: Bester (yellow card) 66'	Report	Try: Tolofua 33' c Echegaray 60' c Con: Gourgues (2/2) 35', 61'; Pen: Gourgues (1/1) 3'

Paarl Gimnasium, Cape Town, South Africa
Referee: Sean Muller

27 August 2022

South Africa 'A'	15–20	France

Paarl Gimnasium, Cape Town, South Africa

27 August 2022

South Africa	44–41	England
Try: Dyer 19' c, 51' c Bester 26' c Penalty Try 32'; Leotlela 66' c Con: Williams (3/3) 20', 27', 52'; Heymans (1/1) 67'; Pen: Williams (2/2) 41', 45'; Heymans (1/1) 73'; Cards: Bester (yellow card) 28'; Boulle (yellow card) 72'	Report	Try: Bennett 8' c Trevett 22'; Glister 28' c Keasey 42' m Pollock 54' m McParland 62' m Edson 64' m Con: Kerr (3/6) 9', 22', 29'; Edson (0/1); Cards: Oliver (yellow card) 32'; O'Driscoll (yellow card) 51'

Paarl Gimnasium, Cape Town, South Africa
Referee: Paul Mente

=== 2021 ===
No tournaments were held in 2021 due to the COVID-19 pandemic.

=== 2020 ===
No tournaments were held in 2020 due to the COVID-19 pandemic.

=== 2019 ===
The results from the 2019 Under-18 International Series were:

9 August 2019
13:00

South Africa 'A'	19–43	France
Try: Indiphile Tyeda; Jacques Rousseau; Teague Loelly; Con: Jordan Hendrikse (2)	Report	Try: Killian Tixeront (2); Leo Barre; Jessy Maizier; Ethan Randale; Logan Tabet; Eric Boussard; Con: Nolann Le Garrec (3); Leo Barre

Paul Roos Gymnasium, Stellenbosch
Referee: Adam Jones

9 August 2019
16:00

South Africa	23–13	Wales
Try: Jan-Hendrik Wessels; Jarrod Taylor; Jurich Claasens; Con: Kian Meadon; Pen: Kian Meadon (2)	Report	Try: Joseph Hawkins; Con: Thomas Mathews; Pen: Thomas Mathews (2)

Paul Roos Gymnasium,
Stellenbosch
Referee: Pablo Deluca

13 August 2019
13:00

South Africa 'A'	31–31	Wales
Try: Teague Loelly (2); Sibusiso Javu; Sonwabo Sokoyi; Con: Jacques Rousseau (4); Pen: Jacques Rousseau	Report	Try: Thomas King; Luke Davies; Mason Grady; Jake Morgan; Con: Thomas Mathews (4); Pen: Thomas Mathews

Paarl Gymnasium, Paarl
Referee: Paul Mente

13 August 2019
14:30

South Africa	48–14	Argentina
Try: Jacques Goosen; Bobby Alexander (2); Henco van Wyk (2); Zeilinga Strydom; Gideon van Wyk; Con: Kian Meadon (5); Pen: Kian Meadon	Report	Try: Ignacio Ruiz; Facundo Villalba; Con: Ramiro Waisberg (2)

Paarl Gimnasium,
Paarl
Referee: Manuel Bottino

17 August 2019
11:15

South Africa 'A'	12–32	Argentina
Try: Teague Loelly; Allister Williams; Con: Jacques Rousseau	Report	Try: Bautista Bernasconi; Jeronimo Gomez Vera; Joaquin Oviedo; Martin Vaca; Alvaro Llaver; Con: Mateo Camerlinckx; Ramiro Waisberg; Pen: Ramiro Waisberg

Hugenote Hoërskool,
Wellington
Referee: Manuel Bottino

17 August 2019
14:15

South Africa	33–27	England
Try: Jan-Hendrik Wessels, André-Hugo Venter, Henco van Wyk, Keane Galant, Jurich Claasens; Con: Jurich Claasens; Pen: Jurich Claasens(2)	Report	Try: Emeka Ilione; Orlando Bailey; Matthew Ward penalty try Con: Orlando Bailey; Pen: Orlando Bailey

Hugenote Hoërskool,
Wellington
Referee: Adam Jones

=== 2018 ===
The results from the 2018 Under-18 International Series were:

10 August 2018
16:00

South Africa	43–40	Wales
Try: Stravino Jacobs 6'; Jean-Jacques Kotze 13', 57'; Mnombo Zwelindaba 17'; Celimpilo Gumede 30'; Juan Mostert 45'; Jurich Claasens 60'; Con: Thomas Bursey 30', 46'; Darren Hendricks 58', 60'; Cards: Stravino Jacobs (yellow card) 19' to 30'	Scoreboard	Try: Aneurin Ellis Owen 2'; Joe Elliett Roberts 9'; Louis William Yendle 26'; Jac Rhys Morgan 47', 60'; Samuel Benjamin Simon Costelow 51'; Con: Samuel Benjamin Simon Costelow 3', 10', 27', 51'; Evan Lewis Lloyd 60'; Cards: Jac Rhys Price (yellow card) 57'

Hoër Landbouskool Boland, Paarl
Referee: Stephan Geldenhuys

14 August 2018
16:00

South Africa	21–28	France
Try: Evan Roos 37'; Jacques Goosen 48', 60'; Con: Darren Hendricks 38', 48', 60'; Cards: Sibusiso Sangweni (yellow card) 30' to 35'	Scoreboard	Try: Kevin Viallard 30'; Martin Dulon 34'; Cheikh Tiberghien 56'; Con: Cheikh Tiberghien 35', 57'; Pen: Cheikh Tiberghien 11', 23', 30'

Stellenberg High School, Bellville
Referee: Keith Allen

18 August 2018
14:05

South Africa	41–22	England
Try: Tristan Dullisear 6'; Sibabalwe Xamlashe 15'; Juan Mostert 32'; Darren Hendricks 51'; Jacques Goosen 55'; Muzilikazi Manyike 56'; Con: Darren Hendricks 16', 33', 55', 57'; Pen: Darren Hendricks 43'	Scoreboard	Try: Tom Roebuck 3', 40'; George Barton 27'; Con: George Barton 4', 28'; Pen: George Barton 12'

SACS, Newlands
Referee: Andrea Piardi

=== 2017 ===
The results from the 2017 Under-19 International Series were:

11 August 2017
16:00

South Africa	28–30	Wales
Try: Kennedy Mpeku 9'; Mark Snyman 71'; Morné Brandon 73'; Con: Sanele Nohamba 71', 73'; Pen: Christopher Schreuder 45', 50', 53'	Rport	Try: Lennon Greggains 1', 61'; Con: Cai Evans 2'; Pen: Cai Evans 4', 22', 25', 32', 57', 68'

Paul Roos Gymnasium, Stellenbosch
Referee: Egon Seconds

15 August 2017
16:00

South Africa	8–13	France
Try: Diego Appollis 43'; Con: Christopher Schreuder 46'	Report	Try: Alban Roussel 34'; Maxence Lemardelet; Pen: Matthis Lebel 17'

Paarl Gimnasium, Paarl
Referee: Egon Seconds

19 August 2017
14:00

South Africa	22–52	England
Try: Muller du Plessis 46', 62'; Henco Martins 49'; Con: Andrew Kota 50', 63'; Pen: Andrew Kota 55'	Report	Try: Ollie Hassell-Collins 15'; Josh Basham 22'; Sam Moore 32'; Nick Rigby 53'; Tom Willis 54'; Caden Murley 65'; Sam Spink 69'; Nick David 74'; Con: Cameron Redpath 23', 33', 53', 66', 70', 75'

City Park Stadium, Athlone
Referee: Stuart Berry

=== 2016 ===
The results from the 2016 Under-19 International Series were:

12 August 2016
13:30

South Africa 'A'	20–23	Italy
Try: Cameron Huffke 25'; Sanele Nohamba 46'; Abner van Reenen 53'; Con: Lubabalo Dobela (0/1); Abner van Reenen 47' (1/2); Pen: Lubabalo Dobela 34' (1/1)	Report; Scoreboard	Try: Giovanni D'Onofrio 10', 19'; Con: Antonio Rizzi 11', 20' (2/2); Pen: Antonio Rizzi 15', 43', 63' (3/4); Cards: Danilo Fischetti (yellow card) 33' to 44'

City Park Stadium, Athlone
Referee: Adam Jones

12 August 2016
15:00

South Africa	23–17	Wales
Try: PJ Botha 32'; Wandisile Simelane 43'; Rikus Pretorius 50'; Con: Gianni Lombard 33' (1/3); Pen: Gianni Lombard 24', 28' (2/2); Cards: Charl Serdyn (yellow card) 30' to 40'	Report; Scoreboard	Try: Jordan Liney 62'; Will Talbot-Davies 66'; Con: Ben Jones 63', 67' (2/2); Pen: Philip Jones 37' (1/1); Cards: William Jones (yellow card) 42' to 53'

City Park Stadium, Athlone
Referee: Matthew O'Grady

16 August 2016
14:30

South Africa 'A'	53–14	England
Try: Janco van Heyningen 6'; Austin Davids 26'; Schalk Erasmus 29', 49'; Tatendaishe Mujawo 36'; Ryno Pieterse 51', 67'; Ayabonga Oliphant 55'; Con: Abner van Reenen 7' (1/1); Tyrone Green 27', 50' (2/5); Austin Davids 56', 68' (2/2); Pen: Abner van Reenen 13' (1/2)	Report; Scoreboard	Try: Gabriel Ibitoye 34'; James Grayson 60'; Con: Tom Parton 35' (1/1); James Grayson 61' (1/1); Cards: Ben Loader (yellow card) 28' to 40'

Diocesan College, Rondebosch
Referee: Adam Jones

16 August 2016
16:00

South Africa	42–3	France
Try: Muller du Plessis 19', 69'; Salmaan Moerat 21', 35'; Mike Mavovana 39'; Damian Willemse 57'; Con: Gianni Lombard 20', 22', 35', 40', 58' (5/5); Ruan de Swardt 70' (1/1); Cards: Salmaan Moerat (yellow card) 54' to 64'	Report; Scoreboard	Pen: Romain Ntamack 3' (1/2)

Diocesan College, Rondebosch
Referee: Matthew O'Grady

20 August 2016
12:45

South Africa 'A'	17–18	Wales
Try: Francke Horn 16'; Tyrone Green 48'; Mark Snyman 69'; Con: Austin Davids 17' (1/2); Cameron Huffke (0/1); Pen: Austin Davids (0/1); Cards: JJ van der Mescht (yellow card) 2' to 13'; Tyrone Green (yellow card) 32' to 43'	Report; Scoreboard	Try: Dane Blacker 40'; Cameron Lewis 52'; Corey Baldwin 66'; Con: Ben Jones (0/3); Pen: Ben Jones 11' (1/2); Cards: Joe Goodchild (yellow card) 15' to 25'

Paarl Boys' High School, Paarl
Referee: Matthew O'Grady

20 August 2016
14:15

South Africa	13–12	England
Try: Salmaan Moerat 70'; Con: Gianni Lombard 71' (1/1); Pen: Gianni Lombard 17', 54' (2/3); Cards: Manuel Rass (yellow card) 27' to 38'	Report; Scoreboard	Try: Tom Willis 20', 48'; Con: Tom Parton (0/1); James Grayson 48' (1/1); Cards: Alex Seville (yellow card) 23' to 33'; Josh Williams (yellow card) 30' to 40'; Jacob Umaga (yellow card) 66'

Paarl Boys' High School, Paarl
Referee: Adam Jones

=== 2015 ===
The results from the 2015 Under-18 International Series were:

7 August 2015
12:00

South Africa 'A'	29–14	Italy
Try: Ryan Muller 46'; Zain Davids 59'; Con: Bader Pretorius 47' (1/1); Eddie Fouché 60' (1/1); Pen: Bader Pretorius 5', 20', 24', 38' (4/5); Eddie Fouché 69' (1/1)	Scoreboard	Try: Andrea Bronzini 18'; Giordano Baldino 43'; Con: Roberto Dal Zilio 19', 44' (2/2); Pen: Roberto Dal Zilio (0/1)

City Park Stadium, Athlone
Referee: Luc Ramos

7 August 2015
16:00

South Africa	42–11	Wales
Try: Embrose Papier 31'; Stedman Gans 36', 44'; Johan Grobbelaar 46'; Ruben de Villiers 64'; Con: Curwin Bosch 32', 45', 47', 65' (4/5); Pen: Curwin Bosch 6', 26', 62' (3/4); Drop: Curwin Bosch (0/1)	Scoreboard	Try: Kieran Williams 68'; Con: Callum Hall (0/1); Pen: Billy McBryde 14', 28' (2/2); Cards: Rhun Williams (red card) 61'

City Park Stadium, Athlone
Referee: Emanuele Tomo

11 August 2015
13:00

South Africa 'A'	8–33	England
Try: Abner van Reenen 62'; Con: Bader Pretorius (0/1); Pen: Eddie Fouché 7' (1/1)	Scoreboard	Try: Max Malins 1', 32'; Gabriel Ibitoye 23'; Josh Bayliss 27'; Theo Brophy Clews 47'; Con: Max Malins 2', 24', 33' (3/4); Theo Brophy Clews 48' (1/1)

Outeniqua Park, George
Referee: Luc Ramos

11 August 2015
17:00

South Africa	12–5	France
Pen: Curwin Bosch 2', 23', 26', 45' (4/5); Drop: Curwin Bosch (0/1); Cards: Ruben de Villiers (yellow card) 68'	Scoreboard	Try: Thomas Darmon 70'; Con: Thomas Darmon (0/1); Pen: Thomas Darmon (0/1); Drop: Thomas Darmon (0/1)

Outeniqua Park, George
Referee: Emanuele Tomo

15 August 2015
11:00

South Africa 'A'	20–20	Wales
Try: Phillip Krause 11'; Bader Pretorius 13'; Kwanda Dimaza 36'; Con: Bader Pretorius (0/2); Cornel Smit 37' (1/1); Pen: Cornel Smit 47' (1/1); Cards: Bader Pretorius (yellow card) 28' to 38'	Scoreboard	Try: Morgan Sieniawski 22'; Josh Macleod 52'; Leon Brown 61'; Con: Callum Hall (0/1); Billy McBryde 53' (1/2); Pen: Callum Hall 4' (1/2); Cards: Morgan Sieniawski (yellow card) 28' to 38'

City Park Stadium, Athlone
Referee: Emanuele Tomo

15 August 2015
15:00

South Africa	23–16	England
Try: Embrose Papier 22'; Hacjivah Dayimani 45'; Con: Curwin Bosch 23', 46' (2/2); Pen: Curwin Bosch 27', 52', 57' (3/3); Drop: Curwin Bosch (0/1); Cards: Hendré Stassen (yellow card) 60'	Scoreboard	Try: Max Malins 40'; Ali Crossdale 70'; Con: Theo Brophy Clews (0/2); Pen: Theo Brophy Clews 4', 31' (2/2); Cards: Max Wright (yellow card) 60'

City Park Stadium, Athlone
Referee: Luc Ramos

=== 2014 ===
The results from the 2014 Under-18 International Series were:

15 August 2014
16:15

South Africa	28–13	France
Try: Andell Loubscher 11', 68'; Barend Smit 35'; Jaco Willemse 46'; Con: Curwin Bosch 12', 35', 47', 69' (4/4); Pen: Curwin Bosch (0/2)	Scoreboard	Try: Antonie Dupont 7'; Con: Anthony Belleau 8' (1/1); Pen: Anthony Belleau 20' (1/1); Drop: Anthony Belleau 28' (1/1)

City Park Stadium, Athlone
Referee: Robert Price

19 August 2014
17:30

South Africa	40–15	Wales
Try: Aston Fortuin 2'; Heino Bezuidenhout 11'; Embrose Papier 41'; JT Jackson 47'; Con: Tinus de Beer 3', 11', 42', 48' (4/4); Pen: Tinus de Beer 9', 19', 22', 29' (4/4); Cards: Tinus de Beer (yellow card) 52' to 62'	Scoreboard	Try: Owen Watkin 64'; Josh Middleton 72'; Con: Dan Jones 64' (1/2); Pen: Dan Jones 4' (1/1)

Outeniqua Park, George
Referee: Jamie Leahy

23 August 2014
16:00

South Africa	22–30	England
Try: Keanu Vers 31', 43'; JT Jackson 62'; Con: Tinus de Beer (0/1); Curwin Bosch 44', 62' (2/2); Pen: Curwin Bosch 14' (1/1)	Scoreboard	Try: Rotimi Segun 8'; Joe Batley 11'; Max Clark 16'; Sam Underhill 37'; Con: Harry Mallinder 12', 16' (2/4); Pen: Harry Mallinder (0/1); Rory Jennings 56', 64' (2/2); Cards: Kieran Treadwell (yellow card) 47' to 58'

A.F. Markötter Stadium, Stellenbosch
Referee: Robert Price

=== 2013 ===
The results from the 2013 Under-18 International Series were:

9 August 2013
15:30

South Africa	19–14	England
Try: Rikus Bothma 19'; Duhan van der Merwe 45'; Con: Grant Hermanus (0/2); Pen: Grant Hermanus 7' (1/1); Brandon Thomson 52', 64' (2/2); Cards: Justin Phillips (yellow card) 48' to 58'	Scoreboard

City Park Stadium, Athlone

13 August 2013
18:00

South Africa	17–13	France
Try: Duhan van der Merwe 1', 55'; Con: Dewald Human 1', 55' (2/2); Pen: Dewald Human 50' (1/2)	Scoreboard

Outeniqua Park, George
Attendance: 4,000

17 August 2013
15:30

South Africa	14–13	Wales
Try: Jean-Luc du Preez 20'; Leolin Zas 31'; Con: Brandon Thomson 20', 31' (2/2); Cards: RG Snyman (yellow card) 59'	Scoreboard

HTS Drostdy, Worcester

=== 2012 ===
The results from the 2012 Under-18 International Series were:

10 August 2012
16:30

South Africa	17–7	France
Try: Sergeal Petersen 14'; Dayan van der Westhuizen 37'; Rohan Janse van Rensburg 68'; Con: Handré Pollard 15' (1/2); Ryno Eksteen (0/1); Pen: Handré Pollard (0/1)	Scoreboard	Try: Romain Ruffenach 28'; Con: Yohan Le Bourhis 29' (1/1)

Hugenote High A Field, Wellington
Referee: Jaco Kotze

14 August 2012
17:00

South Africa	24–16	Wales
Try: Rohan Janse van Rensburg 12'; Sergeal Petersen 27'; Jixie Molapo 30'; Con: Ryno Eksteen (0/1); Handré Pollard (0/1); Pen: Ryno Eksteen (0/2); Handré Pollard 40', 54', 64' (3/3); Cards: Dayan van der Westhuizen (yellow card) 50' to 60'	Scoreboard	Try: Ben Roberts 52'; Con: Jack Maynard 53' (1/1); Pen: Jack Maynard 36', 39', 62' (3/3); Drop: Jack Maynard (0/1); Cards: James Benjamin (yellow card) 64'

Outeniqua Park, George
Referee: Lusanda Jam

18 August 2012
12:45

South Africa	36–29	England
Try: Handré Pollard 19'; Rohan Janse van Rensburg 34'; Sergeal Petersen 53'; Con: Handré Pollard 20', 35', 54' (3/3); Pen: Handré Pollard 3', 26', 37', 48', 62' (5/7)	Scoreboard	Try: Josh Watkins 11'; Gus Jones 32', 51'; Maro Itoje 56'; Zach Kibirige 69'; Con: Billy Burns (0/2); Sam Olver 52', 57' (2/3); Cards: Sam Hill (yellow card) 15' to 25'

UWC Sport Stadium, Cape Town
Referee: Rasta Rasivhenge

== See also ==
- Craven Week
- World Rugby Under 20 Championship
- Rugby union in South Africa
