= South Africa national under-18 rugby union team =

South Africa
- Union: SA Rugby
- Nickname(s): South African Schools; SA Schools; SA U18
- Emblem: Springbok
- Founded: 2012
- Location: South Africa
- Coach: Lwazi Zangqa (2025-2026)
- Captain: Jacobus de Villiers (2026)
- Top scorer: Curwin Bosch (57)
- Most tries: Jacobus de Villiers (5)
- League: U18 International Series
Team kit	Change kit

First international
- South Africa 17–07 France (10 August 2012)

Largest win
- South Africa 59–07 France (7 August 2026)

Largest defeat
- South Africa 22–52 England (19 August 2017)

Union website
- www.sarugby.co.za
- Current season

== History ==
The South African national under‑18 rugby union team, commonly referred to as South African Schools, SA Schools or SA U18, is South Africa's official under‑18 age‑grade rugby union side, administered by South African Rugby Union. The team is a key part of South Africa's player development pathway and compete in the Under-18 International Series, bridging school rugby and junior international rugby, and often serves as a stepping stone towards the Junior Springboks.

Selection for the team takes place annually after the conclusion of South Africa's premier youth tournament for schoolboys, the Craven Week Under‑18 tournament. Top performers from provincial schools sides are chosen to represent South African Schools in international fixtures. Throughout history this selection process has formed a central element of South African schoolboy rugby culture and talent identification.

=== U18 international series ===
Although the SA U18 side does not participate in a formal global championship, since 2012 it has hosted an annual international competition known as the Under‑18 International Series, which was rebranded from 2016 onwards as the U19 International Series. This series, usually staged in August in the Western Cape region of South Africa, brings together national age‑grade teams from Europe and beyond for a series of three match days at school and club venues.

Participating nations in recent years have included England, France, Ireland, Georgia and Wales, with both an SA U18 (first team) and an SA U18 "A" (academy) squad competing. In the 2025 edition the SA U18 team won all three of its matches, defeating France, Ireland and England with a combined 157 points scored across seven tries per match on average.

This international series forms a key part of SA Rugby's Elite Player Development (EPD) stream, giving South African schoolboys exposure to international competition and aiding the transition of top talents into South Africa's U19 and U20 structures.

=== Relation to under‑19 and under‑20 pathways ===
Prior to age‑grade restructuring in 2008, South Africa maintained a stand‑alone national U19 side that competed in the IRB U19 World Championship. After restructuring, the primary global age‑grade competition became the U20 World Rugby Championship, and the U19 level has since operated mainly as a developmental stage within South African Rugby's broader pathway system.

South African Schools U18 remains a principal feeder for both U19 academy squads and the Junior Springboks, with coaches and selectors from the U20 programme involved in talent identification and mentoring at the series and selection camps.

=== Domestic and development impact ===
Selection to the SA Schools U18 side is widely regarded as one of the highest honours in South African schoolboy rugby and attracts attention from provincial academies and professional franchises. Performances at this level often influence progression into professional provincial sides as well as Junior Springbok selection in subsequent years.

== SA schools ==
=== Records and achievements ===
==== SA u18 head to head ====
*Stats correct as of 16 August 2026

Opposition	P	W	D	L	PF	PA	PD	W %
England	14	12	0	2	502	364	138	86%
France	10	8	0	2	299	1136	163	80%
Wales	8	7	0	1	237	155	82	88%
Ireland	3	3	0	0	134	46	88	100%
Argentina	1	1	0	0	48	14	34	100%
Total	36	31	0	5	1,220	715	517	86%

Note: These results reflect only the performances of South African Schools (SA Schools) since their reintroduction in 2012. SA ‘A’ (Academy) team results are not included in the table above.

==== SA schools u18 international record ====
*Stats correct as of 16 August 2026

South Africa – U18 International Series Record
Year	Host nation	P	W	D	L	PF	PA	PD	W%
2012	(South Africa) SA	3	3	0	0	77	52	25	100%
2013	(South Africa) SA	3	3	0	0	50	40	10	100%
2014	(South Africa) SA	3	2	0	1	90	58	32	67%
2015	(South Africa) SA	3	3	0	0	77	32	45	100%
2016	(South Africa) SA	3	3	0	0	78	32	56	100%
2017	(South Africa) SA	3	0	0	3	58	95	(37)	0%
2018	(South Africa) SA	2	2	0	0	84	62	22	100%
2019	(South Africa) SA	3	3	0	0	104	54	40	100%
2020–2021	Cancelled due to the COVID-19 pandemic								
2022	(South Africa) SA	3	3	0	0	133	82	51	100%
2023	(South Africa) SA	2	1	0	1	57	56	1	50%
2024	(South Africa) SA	2	2	0	0	77	40	37	100%
2025	(South Africa) SA	3	3	0	0	157	50	127	100%
2026	(South Africa) SA	3	3	0	0	178	62	116	100%
Total		36	31	0	5	1,220	715	517	86%

Note: These results reflect only the performances of South African Schools (SA Schools) since their reintroduction in 2012. SA ‘A’ (Academy) team results are not included in the table above.

==== SA u18 points leaders ====
The table below highlights South Africa’s U18 top all-time points scorers since the Under-18 International Series started in 2012:

*Stats correct as of 17 August 2026

Most Points Scored
Rank	Name	Points
1	Curwin Bosch	57
2	Handre Pollard	37
3	Thurlon Williams	33
T4	Ethan van Biljon	26
T4	Liyema Nela	26
T4	Gianni Lombard	26
7	Jacobus de Villiers	25
8	Stehan Heymans	23
9	Kean Meadon	21
T10	Markus Muller	20
T10	Lamla Mgedezi	20
T10	Cheswill Jooste	20
T10	Darren Hendricks	20
T10	Muller du Plessis	20
T10	Tinus de Beer	20
T10	Theodorus Boshoff	20
T17	Jurich Claasens	18
T17	Achmat Behardien	18
T19	Henco van Wyk	15
T19	Salmaan Moerat	15
T19	Embrose Papier	15
T19	Duhan van der Merwe	15
T19	Rohan Janse van Rensburg	15
T19	Sergeal Petersen	15
T19	Charles Whitehead	15
T19	Anesu Kuzonyei	15
27	Ruben Groenewald	14

Note: These stats reflect only the performances of South African Schools (SA Schools) players since 2012. SA ‘A’ (Academy) players are not included.

==== SA u18 try leaders ====
The table below highlights South Africa’s U18 top all-time tries scored since the Under-18 International Series started in 2012:

*Stats correct as of 17 August 2026

Most Tries Scored
Rank	Name	Tries
1	Jacobus de Villiers	5
T2	Cheswill Jooste	4
T2	Lamla Mgedezi	4
T2	Markus Muller	4
T2	Muller du Plessis	4
T2	Theodorus Boshoff	4
T7	Anesu Kuzonyei	3
T7	Charles Whitehead	3
T7	Duhan van der Merwe	3
T7	Embrose Papier	3
T7	Henco van Wyk	3
T7	Rohan Janse van Rensburg	3
T4	Salmaan Moerat	3
T4	Sergeal Petersen	3

Note: These stats reflect only the performances of South African Schools (SA Schools) players since 2012. SA ‘A’ (Academy) players are not included.

== SA schools academy ==
=== Records & achievements ===
==== SA 'a u18 head to head ====
*Stats correct as of 16 August 2026

Opposition	P	W	D	L	PF	PA	PD	W %
Italy	3	2	0	1	97	66	31	67%
Wales	2	0	2	0	51	51	0	50%
England	3	1	0	2	95	83	12	50%
Georgia	3	3	0	0	97	22	75	100%
Argentina	1	0	0	1	12	27	(15)	0%
Ireland	2	1	0	1	68	70	(2)	50%
France	5	1	0	4	122	155	(33)	20%
Total	19	9	2	9	542	474	68	47%

Note: These results reflect only the performances of SA ‘A’ (Academy) since their reintroduction in 2014. South African Schools (SA Schools) team results are not included.

==== SA 'a u18 international records ====
*Stats correct as of 16 August 2026

SA Academy – U18 International Series Record
Year	Host nation	P	W	D	L	PF	PA	PD	W%
2014	(South Africa) SA	1	1	0	0	48	29	19	100%
2015	(South Africa) SA	3	1	1	1	57	67	(10)	50%
2016	(South Africa) SA	2	1	0	1	73	37	36	50%
2017–2018	No events occurred during these periods								
2019	(South Africa) SA	3	0	1	2	62	101	(39)	17%
2020–2021	Cancelled due to the COVID-19 pandemic								
2022	(South Africa) SA	2	1	0	1	72	82	(10)	50%
2023	No events occurred during this period								
2024	(South Africa) SA	1	1	0	0	20	3	17	100%
2025	(South Africa) SA	3	1	0	2	107	98	9	33%
2026	(South Africa) SA	3	3	0	0	103	57	46	100%
Total		19	9	2	7	542	474	68	47%

Note: These results reflect only the performances of SA ‘A’ (Academy) since their reintroduction in 2014. South African Schools (SA Schools) team results are not included.

== Results ==
=== 2012 ===
South Africa's results in the 2012 Under-18 International Series were:

10 August 2012
16:30

South Africa	17–7	France
Try: Petersen 14' c van der Westhuizen 37' m van Rensburg 68' m Con: Pollard (1/2) 15'; Eksteen (0/1); Pen: Pollard (0/1)	Report	Try: Ruffenach 28' c Con: Le Bourhis (1/1) 29'

Hugenote High A Field, Wellington
Referee: Jaco Kotze

14 August 2012
17:00

South Africa	24–16	Wales
Try: van Rensburg 12' m Petersen 27' m Molapo 30' m Con: Eksteen (0/1); Pollard (0/1); Pen: Eksteen (0/2); Handré Pollard (3/3) 40', 54', 64'; Cards: van der Westhuizen (yellow card) 50' to 60'	Report	Try: Roberts 52' c Con: Maynard (1/1) 53'; Pen: Maynard (3/3) 36', 39', 62'; Drop: Maynard (0/1); Cards: Benjamin (yellow card) 64'

Outeniqua Park, George
Referee: Lusanda Jam

18 August 2012
12:45

South Africa	36–29	England
Try: Pollard 19' c van Rensburg 34' c Petersen 53' c Con: Pollard (3/3) 20', 35', 54'; Pen: Pollard (5/7) 3', 26', 37', 48', 62'	Report	Try: Watkins 11' m Jones 32' m, 51' c Itoje 56' c Kibirige 69' m Con: Burns (0/2); Olver (2/3) 52', 57'; Cards: Hill (yellow card) 15' to 25'

UWC Sport Stadium, Cape Town
Referee: Rasta Rasivhenge

=== 2013 ===
South Africa's results in the 2013 Under-18 International Series were:

9 August 2013
15:30

South Africa	19–14	England
Try: Bothma 19' m van der Merwe 45' m Con: Hermanus (0/2); Pen: Hermanus (1/1) 7'; Thomson (2/2) 52', 64'; Cards: Phillips (yellow card) 48' to 58'	Report

City Park Stadium, Athlone

13 August 2013
18:00

South Africa	17–13	France
Try: van der Merwe 1' c, 55' c Con: Human (2/2) 1', 55'; Pen: Human (1/2) 50'	Report

Outeniqua Park, George
Attendance: 4,000

17 August 2013
15:30

South Africa	14–13	Wales
Try: du Preez 20' c Zas 31' c Con: Thomson (2/2) 20', 31'; Cards: Snyman (yellow card) 59'	Report

HTS Drostdy, Worcester

=== 2014 ===
South Africa's results in the 2014 Under-18 International Series were:

15 August 2014
16:15

South Africa	28–13	France
Try: Loubscher 11', 68'; Smit 35'; Willemse 46'; Con: Bosch (4/4) 12', 35', 47', 69'; Pen: Bosch (0/2)	Report	Try: Dupont 7' c Con: Belleau (1/1) 8'; Pen: Belleau (1/1) 20'; Drop: Belleau (1/1) 28'

City Park Stadium, Athlone
Referee: Robert Price

19 August 2014
17:30

South Africa	40–15	Wales
Try: Fortuin 2' c Bezuidenhout 11' c Papier 41' c Jackson 47' c Con: de Beer (4/4) 3', 11', 42', 48'; Pen: de Beer (4/4) 9', 19', 22', 29'; Cards: de Beer (yellow card) 52' to 62'	Report	Try: Watkin 64' c Middleton 72' m Con: Jones (1/2) 64'; Pen: Jones (1/1) 4'

Outeniqua Park, George
Referee: Jamie Leahy

23 August 2014
16:00

South Africa	22–30	England
Try: Vers 31' m, 43' c Jackson 62' c Con: de Beer (0/1); Bosch (2/2) 44', 62'; Pen: Bosch (1/1) 14'	Report	Try: Segun 8' m Batley 11' c Clark 16' c Underhill 37' m Con: Mallinder (2/4) 12', 16'; Pen: Mallinder (0/1); Jennings (2/2) 56', 64'; Cards: Treadwell (yellow card) 47' to 58'

A.F. Markötter Stadium, Stellenbosch
Referee: Robert Price

=== 2015 ===
The results for South Africa and South Africa 'A' in the 2015 Under-18 International Series were:

7 August 2015
12:00

South Africa 'A'	29–14	Italy
Try: Muller 46' c Davids 59' c Con: Pretorius (1/1) 47'; Fouché (1/1) 60'; Pen: Pretorius (4/5) 5', 20', 24', 38'; Fouché (1/1) 69'	Report	Try: Bronzini 18' c Baldino 43' c Con: Dal Zilio (2/2) 19', 44'; Pen: Dal Zilio (0/1)

City Park Stadium, Athlone
Referee: Luc Ramos

7 August 2015
16:00

South Africa	42–11	Wales
Try: Papier 31' c Gans 36' m, 44' c Grobbelaar 46' c de Villiers 64' c Con: Bosch (4/5) 32', 45' ,47', 65'; Pen: Bosch (3/4) 6', 26', 62'; Drop: Bosch (0/1)	Report	Try: Williams 68' m Con: Hall (0/1); Pen: McBryde (2/2) 14', 28'; Cards: Williams (red card) 61'

City Park Stadium, Athlone
Referee: Emanuele Tomo

11 August 2015
13:00

South Africa 'A'	8–33	England
Try: van Reenen 62' m Con: Pretorius (0/1); Pen: Fouché (1/1) 7'	Report	Try: Malins 1' c, 32' c Ibitoye 23' c Bayliss 27' m Clews 47' c Con: Malins (3/4) 2', 24', 33'; Clews (1/1) 48'

Outeniqua Park, George
Referee: Luc Ramos

11 August 2015
17:00

South Africa	12–5	France
Pen: Bosch (4/5) 2', 23', 26', 45'; Drop: Bosch (0/1); Cards: de Villiers (yellow card) 68'	Report	Try: Darmon 70' m Con: Darmon (0/1); Pen: Darmon (0/1); Drop: Darmon (0/1)

Outeniqua Park, George
Referee: Emanuele Tomo

15 August 2015
11:00

South Africa 'A'	20–20	Wales
Try: Krause 11' m Pretorius 13' m Dimaza 36' c Con: Pretorius (0/2); Smit (1/1) 37'; Pen: Smit (1/1) 47'; Cards: Pretorius (yellow card) 28' to 38'	Report	Try: Sieniawski 22' m Macleod 52' c Brown 61' m Con: Hall (0/1); McBryde (1/2) 53'; Pen: Hall (1/2) 4'; Cards: Sieniawski (yellow card) 28' to 38'

City Park Stadium, Athlone
Referee: Emanuele Tomo

15 August 2015
15:00

South Africa	23–16	England
Try: Papier 22' c Dayimani 45' c Con: Bosch (2/2) 23', 46'; Pen: Bosch (3/3) 27', 52', 57'; Drop: Bosch (0/1); Cards: Stassen (yellow card) 60'	Report	Try: Malins 40' m Crossdale 70' m Con: Clews (0/2); Pen: Clews (2/2) 4', 31'; Cards: Wright (yellow card) 60'

City Park Stadium, Athlone
Referee: Luc Ramos

=== 2016 ===
The results for South Africa and South Africa 'A' in the 2016 Under-19 International Series were:

12 August 2016
13:30

South Africa 'A'	20–23	Italy
Try: Huffke 25' m Nohamba 46' c van Reenen 53' m Con: Dobela (0/1) van Reenen (1/2) 47'; Pen: Dobela (1/1) 34'	Report	Try: D'Onofrio 10' c, 19' c Con: Rizzi (2/2) 11', 20'; Pen: Rizzi (3/4) 15', 43', 63'; Cards: Fischetti (yellow card) 33' to 44'

City Park Stadium, Athlone
Referee: Adam Jones

12 August 2016
15:00

South Africa	23–17	Wales
Try: Botha 32' c Simelane 43' m Pretorius 50' m Con: Lombard (1/3) 33'; Pen: Lombard (2/2) 24', 28'; Cards: Serdyn (yellow card) 30' to 40'	Report	Try: Liney 62' c Talbot-Davies 66' c Con: Jones (2/2) 63', 67'; Pen: Jones (1/1) 37'; Cards: Jones (yellow card) 42' to 53'

City Park Stadium, Athlone
Referee: Matthew O'Grady

16 August 2016
14:30

South Africa 'A'	53–14	England
Try: van Heyningen 6' c Davids 26' c Erasmus 29' m, 49' c Mujawo 36' m Pieterse 51' m, 67' c Oliphant 55' c Con: van Reenen (1/1) 7'; Green (2/5) 27', 50'; Davids (2/2) 56', 68'; Pen: van Reenen (1/2) 13'	Report	Try: Ibitoye 34' c Grayson 60' c Con: Parton (1/1) 35'; Grayson (1/1) 61'; Cards: Loader (yellow card) 28' to 40'

Diocesan College, Rondebosch
Referee: Adam Jones

16 August 2016
16:00

South Africa	42–3	France
Try: du Plessis 19' c, 69' c Moerat 21' c, 35' c Mavovana 39' c Willemse 57' c Con: Lombard (5/5) 20', 22', 35', 40', 58' de Swardt (1/1) 70'; Cards: Moerat (yellow card) 54' to 64'	Report	Pen: Ntamack (1/2) 3'

Diocesan College, Rondebosch
Referee: Matthew O'Grady

20 August 2016
12:45

South Africa 'A'	17–18	Wales
Try: Horn 16' c Green 48' m Snyman 69' m Con: Davids (1/2) 17'; Huffke (0/1); Pen: Davids (0/1); Cards: van der Mescht (yellow card) 2' to 13'; Green (yellow card) 32' to 43'	Report	Try: Blacker 40' m Lewis 52' m Baldwin 66' m Con: Jones (0/3); Pen: Jones (1/2) 11'; Cards: Goodchild (yellow card) 15' to 25'

Paarl Boys' High School, Paarl
Referee: Matthew O'Grady

20 August 2016
14:15

South Africa	13–12	England
Try: Moerat 70' c Con: Lombard (1/1) 71'; Pen: Lombard (2/3) 17', 54'; Cards: Rass (yellow card) 27' to 38'	Report	Try: Willis 20' m, 48' c Con: Parton (0/1); Grayson (1/1) 48'; Cards: Seville (yellow card) 23' to 33'; Williams (yellow card) 30' to 40'; Umaga (yellow card) 66'

Paarl Boys' High School, Paarl
Referee: Adam Jones

=== 2017 ===
The results for South Africa in the 2017 Under-19 International Series were:

11 August 2017
16:00

South Africa	28–30	Wales
Try: Mpeku 9' m Snyman 71' c Brandon 73' c Con: Nohamba (2/3) 71', 73'; Pen: Schreuder (3/3) 45', 50', 53'	Report	Try: Greggains 1' c, 61' m Con: Evans (1/2) 2'; Pen: Evans (6/6) 4',22', 25', 32', 57', 68'

Paul Roos Gymnasium, Stellenbosch
Referee: Egon Seconds

15 August 2017
16:00

South Africa	8–13	France
Try: Appollis 43' m Con: Schreuder (0/1); Pen: Schreuder (1/1) 46'	Report	Try: Roussel 34' m Lemardelet 47' m Con: Lebel (0/2); Pen: Lebel (1/1) 17'

Paarl Gimnasium, Paarl
Referee: Egon Seconds

19 August 2017
14:00

South Africa	22–52	England
Try: du Plessis 46' m, 62' c Martins 49' c Con: Kota (2/3) 50', 63'; Pen: Kota (1/1) 55'	Report	Try: Hassell-Collins 15' m Basham 22' c Moore 32' c Rigby 53' c Willis 54' m Murley 65' c Spink 69' c David 74' c Con: Redpath (6/7) 23', 33', 53', 66', 70', 75'

City Park Stadium, Athlone
Referee: Stuart Berry

=== 2018 ===
The results in the 2018 Under-18 International Series were:

10 August 2018
16:00

South Africa	43–40	Wales
Try: Jacobs 6' m Kotze 13' m, 57' c Zwelindaba 17' m Gumede 30' c Mostert 45' c Claasens 60' c Con: Bursey (2/4) 30', 46'; Hendricks (2/2) 58', 60'; Cards: Jacobs (yellow card) 19' to 30'	Report	Try: Owen 2' c Roberts 9' c Yendle 26' c Morgan 47' m, 60' c Costelow 51' c Con: Costelow (4/5) 3', 10', 27', 51'; Lloyd (1/1) 61'; Cards: Price (yellow card) 57'

Hoër Landbouskool Boland, Paarl, South Africa
Referee: Stephan Geldenhuys

14 August 2018
16:00

South Africa	21–28	France
Try: Roos 37' c Goosen 48' c, 60' c Con: Hendricks (3/3) 38', 48', 60'; Cards: SAngweni (yellow card) 25' to 35'	Report	Try: Viallard 30' m Dulon 34' c Tiberghien 56' c Con: Tiberghien (2/3) 35', 57'; Pen: Tiberghien (3/3) 11', 23', 30'

Stellenberg High School, Bellville, South Africa
Referee: Keith Allen

18 August 2018
14:05

South Africa	41–22	England
Try: Dullisear 6'm Xamlashe 15' c Mostert 32' c Hendricks 51' m Goosen 55' c Manyike 56' c Con: Hendricks (4/6) 16', 33', 55', 57'; Pen: Hendricks (1/1) 43'	Report	Try: Roebuck 3' c, 40'm Barton 27' c Con: Barton (2/2) 4', 28'; Pen: Barton (1/1) 12'

SACS, Newlands, Cape Town, South Africa
Referee: Andrea Piardi

=== 2019 ===
The SA Schools results in the 2019 Under-18 International Series were:

9 August 2019
13:00

South Africa 'A'	19–43	France
Try: Indiphile Tyeda; Jacques Rousseau; Teague Loelly; Con: Jordan Hendrikse (2)	Report	Try: Killian Tixeront (2); Leo Barre; Jessy Maizier; Ethan Randale; Logan Tabet; Eric Boussard; Con: Nolann Le Garrec (3); Leo Barre

Paul Roos Gymnasium, Stellenbosch
Referee: Adam Jones

9 August 2019
16:00

South Africa	23–13	Wales
Try: Claasens 43' cWessels 47' m Taylor 70' m Con: Meadon (1/3) 44'; Pen: Meadon (2/2) 11', 30'; Cards: Taylor (yellow card) 20'	Report	Try: Hawkins 25'; Con: Matthews (1/1) 26'; Pen: Matthews (2/2) 14', 51'

Paul Roos Gymnasium,
Stellenbosch, South Africa
Referee: Pablo Deluca

13 August 2019
13:00

South Africa 'A'	31–31	Wales
Try: Teague Loelly (2); Sibusiso Javu; Sonwabo Sokoyi; Con: Jacques Rousseau (4); Pen: Jacques Rousseau	Report	Try: Thomas King; Luke Davies; Mason Grady; Jake Morgan; Con: Thomas Mathews (4); Pen: Thomas Mathews

Paarl Gymnasium, Paarl
Referee: Paul Mente

13 August 2019
14:30

South Africa	48–14	Argentina
Try: Alexander 11' c, 29' m can Wyk 14' c, 50' c Goosen 23' c van Wyk 52' c Zeilinga Strydom 61' m Con: Meadon (5/7) 12', 15', 25', 51', 53'; Pen: Meadon (1/1) 28'	Report	Try: Villalba 7' c Ruiz 69' c Con: Waisberg (2/2) 8', 69'

Paarl Gimnasium, Paarl, South Africa
Referee: Manuel Bottino

17 August 2019
11:15

South Africa 'A'	12–32	Argentina
Try: Teague Loelly; Allister Williams; Con: Jacques Rousseau	Report	Try: Bautista Bernasconi; Jeronimo Gomez Vera; Joaquin Oviedo; Martin Vaca; Alvaro Llaver; Con: Mateo Camerlinckx; Ramiro Waisberg; Pen: Ramiro Waisberg

Hugenote Hoërskool,
Wellington
Referee: Manuel Bottino

17 August 2019
14:15

South Africa	33–27	England
Try: Venter 6' m Wessels 11' m van Wyk 48' m van Wyk 53' m Galant 64' c Con: Claasens (1/5) 65'; Pen: Claasens (2/2) 29', 57'	Report	Try: Ilione 16' c Penalty Try 23'; Bailey 31' m Ward 42' m Con: Bailey (1/3) 17'; Pen: Bailey (1/1) 61'

Hugenote Hoërskool, Wellington, South Africa
Referee: Adam Jones

=== 2020 ===
No tournaments were held due to the COVID-19 pandemic.

=== 2021 ===
No tournaments were held due to the COVID-19 pandemic.

=== 2022 ===
The SA Schools results in the 2022 Under-18 International Series were:

19 August 2022

South Africa 'A'	23–26	France
Try: Smal 13' m, 27' c Con: Koen (1/2) 28'; Pen: Koen (1/1) 59'; Cards: van Niekerk (yellow card) 55'	Report	Try: x 5' c x 34' m x 43' m Con: #13 (1/3) 6'; Pen: #13 (1/2) 55'; Cards: #6 (yellow card) 49' #16 (yellow card) 65'

Paarl Gimnasium, Cape Town, South Africa

19 August 2022

South Africa	40–24	England
Try: Bester 25' c Abrahams 30' c Bakkes 46' c Waterhouse 71' c Con: Heymans (3/3) 26', 31', 47'; Williams (1/1) 72'; Pen: Heymans (4/4) 3', 11', 14', 41'; Cards: Badenhorst (red card) 78'	Report	Try: Bennett 21' c Keasey 50' c, 73' c Con: Taylor (2/2) 22', 51'; Weston (1/1) 74'; Pen: Taylor (1/1) 2'

Paarl Gimnasium, Cape Town, South Africa
Referee: Dylen November

23 August 2022

South Africa 'A'	34–36	England
Try: Tom; Mpaka (2); Cupido; Con: Giddy (4/4); Pen: Giddy (2/2)		Try: Glister; Owen; Sela; Redshaw; Con: Weston (1/2); Taylor (3/3); Pen: Taylor (1/1)

Paarl Gimnasium, Cape Town, South Africa

23 August 2022

South Africa	49–17	France
Try: De Jongh 11' c, 46' c Bester 15' c, 53' c Sherwood 17' m Nel 19' c Con: Williams (5/6) 12', 16' 20', 47', 54'; Pen: Williams (3/3) 6', 40' 43'; Cards: Bester (yellow card) 66'	Report	Try: Tolofua 33' c Echegaray 60' c Con: Gourgues (2/2) 35', 61'; Pen: Gourgues (1/1) 3'

Paarl Gimnasium, Cape Town, South Africa
Referee: Sean Muller

27 August 2022

South Africa 'A'	15–20	France

Paarl Gimnasium, Cape Town, South Africa

27 August 2022

South Africa	44–41	England
Try: Dyer 19' c, 51' c Bester 26' c Penalty Try 32'; Leotlela 66' c Con: Williams (3/3) 20', 27', 52'; Heymans (1/1) 67'; Pen: Williams (2/2) 41', 45'; Heymans (1/1) 73'; Cards: Bester (yellow card) 28'; Boulle (yellow card) 72'	Report	Try: Bennett 8' c Trevett 22'; Glister 28' c Keasey 42' m Pollock 54' m McParland 62' m Edson 64' m Con: Kerr (3/6) 9', 22', 29'; Edson (0/1); Cards: Oliver (yellow card) 32'; O'Driscoll (yellow card) 51'

Paarl Gimnasium, Cape Town, South Africa
Referee: Paul Mente

=== 2023 ===
The SA Schools results in the 2023 Under-18 International Series were:

15 August 2023
14:00

South Africa	24–37	France
Try: Pead 40' c, 66' m Purchase 46' c Kunene 72' m Con: Malgas (2/4) 40', 66'	Report	Try: Boichot 33' c Mignot 36' c Duthil 43' c Garault 56' c Con: Jurd (3/3) 34', 37', 44'; Keletaona (1/1) 57'; Pen: Jurd (3/3) 7', 12', 15'; Cards: Marzullo (yellow card) 64'

Stellenberg High School, Durbanville, South Africa
Referee: Sean Muller

19 August 2023
14:30

South Africa	33–19	England
Try: Mars 12' c Cupido 23' c Jooste 27' c Theron 49' c Nel 60' m Con: Smith (4/5) 13', 23', 28', 50'	Report	Try: Kpoku 10' c Lilley 14' c Baker 29' m Con: Hall (2/3) 11', 15'

Paarl Boys' High School, Paarl, South Africa
Referee: Jonathan Lee Lottering

=== 2024 ===
The SA Schools results in the 2024 Under-18 International Series were:

12 August 2024

South Africa 'A'	20–03	Georgia
Try: Miller; Newman; Con: Giliomee (2); Pen: Giliomee (2)	Report	Pen: Sirbiladze (1)

Stellenberg High School,
Cape Town

16 August 2024
14:30

South Africa	38–26	Ireland
Try: Muller 7' c Siyaya 12' c, 24' c Mnebelele 49' c Jooste 55' c Con: Ahmed (3/3) 7', 13', 25'; Boqwana (2/2) 50', 56'; Pen: Moyo (1/1) 59'; Cards: Boqwana (yellow card) 32'; Ahmed (yellow card) 45'	Report	Try: Magee 1' m, 46' c Deegan 21' c Conway 64' c Con: Wood (1/2) 22'; O'Shaughnessy (2/2) 47', 64'

Paarl Gimnasium, Paarl, South Africa
Referee: Jonathan Lee Lottering

20 August 2024
12:30

South Africa	39–14	England
Try: Rasivhaga 16' c Kruger 25' c Jooste 60' m, 68' c Meyer 71' c Con: Moyo (2/2) 17', 27'; Ahmed (2/3) 69', 72'; Pen: Moyo (2/2) 8', 43'	Report	Try: Newman 19' c Treacey 66' c Con: Linegar (2/2) 20', 67'

Paarl Boys' High School, Paarl, South Africa
Referee: Dylen November

=== 2025 ===
The SA Schools results in the 2025 Under-18 International Series were:

8 August 2025
11h30

South Africa 'A'	36–39	Ireland
Try: Singo; Viljoen (2); Kepe; Mthethwa; Con: Uithaler (4); Pen: Uithaler (1)	Report	Try: Fitzpatrick (2); White (2); Lautsou; Con: Coffey (2); McVicker (2); Pen: Connor McVicker(1)

Hoërskool Durbanville, Cape Town, South Africa

8 August 2025
15h30

South Africa	43–21	France
Try: Kemp 1' c, 19' c Amadi 25' c Muller 33' c de Villiers 52' m Stuart 65' c Con: Nela (4/4) 2', 20', 26', 34'; Groenewald (1/2) 66'; Pen: Nela (1/1) 30'; Cards: Pratt (yellow card) 6'	Report	Try: Baret 42' c Tani 61' c, 69' c Con: Gillouin-Lemaire (1/1) 43'; Bouju (2/2) 62', 69'; Cards: Watat (yellow card) 50'

Hoërskool Durbanville, Cape Town, South Africa
Referee: Charlwin Darries

12 August 2025
11h30

South Africa 'A'	57–19	Georgia
Try: Muller; Turner; Kepe; Pasensie (2); Potgieter (2); Nelson; Aneke; Con: Uithaler (6)	Report	Try: Gocha; Nikoloz; Razmadze; Con: Levani (2)

Hoër Landbouskool Boland, Paarl, South Africa

12 August 2025
11h30

South Africa	45–5	Ireland
Try: Joubert 14' m Agu 24' m Brits 33' c Mgedezi 40' c Penalty Try 48'; Afrikaner 56' c Adams 74' c Con: Groenewald (2/4) 34', 41'; Nela (2/2) 57', 75'	Report	Try: Goslin 51' m

Hoër Landbouskool Boland, Paarl, South Africa
Referee: Excellent Mnkomo

16 August 2025
11h30

South Africa 'A'	14–40	France
Try: Muller 15' c Penalty Try 25'; Con: Uithaler (1/1) 16'	Report	Try: Laouna 10' m Mbaye 17' m Echegaray 56' m Manac’h 65' c Brosset 69' m Con: Lemaire (1/3) 56'; Favrau (1/2) 66'; Pen: Lemaire (2/2) 21', 26'; Favrau (1/1) 64'

Paarl Gimnasium, Paarl, South Africa

16 August 2025
15h30

South Africa	69–24	England
Try: Afrikaner 1' c Kemp 5' c Muller 12' c, 54' c Adams 43' c Stuart 44' m Badenhorst 49' c Rabe 64' m Neill 67' c Vorster 71' c Con: Nela (4/6) 2', 6', 13', 43'; Groenewald (4/5) 50', 54', 68', 72'; Pen: Nela (1/1) 26'; Cards: Vorster (yellow card) 79'	Report	Try: Ogbonnaya 21' c Horsfall 32' c Treacey 80' c Con: Shields (2/2) 22', 33'; Talbot (1/1) 80'; Pen: Shields (1/1) 77'

Paarl Gimnasium, Paarl, South Africa
Referee: Caleb Hibbert

=== 2026 ===
The SA Schools fixtures for the 2026 Under-18 International Series are:

7 August 2026
10:30 (SAST)

South Africa 'A U18	32-31	Ireland U18
Try: Els 26' c de Bruin 29' c van Niekerk 56' m Mataboge 59' c Con: Viljoen (3/4) 27', 30', 60'; Pen: Viljoen (1/1) 37'; Pheiffer (1/2) 75'	Report	Try: Smyth 12' c, 61' c Boyle 43' c McCarthy 64' c Con: Nolan (4/4) 13', 44', 62', 65'; Pen: Coffey (1/1) 68'

Durbanville High School, Cape Town, South Africa

7 August 2026
14:30 (SAST)

South Africa U18	59-07	France U18
Try: Mgedezi 9' c, 62' c de Villiers 18' c Kuzoneyl 31' c Kepe 36' c van der Vyver 43' c Doyle 49' c Barker 55' c Simelane 64' m Con: van Biljon (5/5) 10', 19', 32', 37', 44'; Behardien (3/4) 50', 56', 63'	Report	Try: Rous 15' c Con: Trillo (1/1) 16'; Cards: Andrieu (yellow card) 42' x (yellow card) 47'

Durbanville High School, Cape Town, South Africa
Referee: Jack MacNeice

11 August 2026
10:30 (SAST)

South Africa 'A U18	20-00	Georgia U18
Try: Baron 26' m Genis 36' m Schulze 70' c Con: Viljoen (1/2) 61'; Drop: Viljoen (1/1) 35'	Report

Hoër Landbouskool Boland, Paarl, South Africa
Attendance: 5,000+
Referee: Zoe Naude (South Africa)

11 August 2026
14:30 (SAST)

South Africa U18	51-15	Ireland U18
Try: Bosshof 3' c Mgedezi 15’ m Kuzonyei 24’ c de Villiers 29’ m Whitehead 48’ m, 59’ m van der Vyver 65’ c Makelele 68’ c Con: Behardien (2/5) 4', 25’ van Biljon (2/3) 66’, 68’ Pen: van Biljon (1/1) 54'; Cards: Kuzonyei (yellow card) 56'	Report	Try: Moloney 31’ m Coffey 37’ m Woods 69’ m Cards: Smith (yellow card) 66'

Hoër Landbouskool Boland, Paarl, South Africa
Attendance: 5,000+
Referee: Caleb Hibbert (South Africa)

15 August 2026
10:30 (SAST)

South Africa 'A U18	51-26	France U18
Try: Mehlomakulu 6' c Malan 8' c Magau 15' c Viljoen 42' c Saunders 45' c Hendricks 59' m Genis 71' m Con: Viljoen (5/5) 7', 9', 16', 43', 46'; Pen: Viljoen (1/1) 27'; Drop: Viljoen (1/1) 37'; Cards: Prins (yellow card) 64'	Fixtures	Try: Codorniou 20' c Noel 30' c Roudaut 35' c Richerol 67' m Con: Trillon (3/4) 21',31', 35'

Stellenberg High School, Cape Town, South Africa
Attendance: 3,000+

15 August 2026
14:30 (SAST)

South Africa U18	68-40	England U18
Try: Whitehead 13' m Kepe 16' m, 31' c De Villiers 21' c, 63' c Boshoff 42' c, 67' c, 71' c van Biljon 44' c Kuzonyei 49' c Con: van Biljon (3/4) 17', 22', 32'; Behardien (6/6) 43', 45', 50', 64', 68', 72'; Cards: Whitehead (yellow card) 34'	Report	Try: Guyver 9' c Moore 28' c Bray 35' m Elone 54' c Bayston 60' c McIntosh 64' c Con: Jones (1/1) 10'; Talbot (3/4) 28', 60', 65'; Goode (1/1) 55'; Cards: Jones (yellow card) 30'; Allen (yellow card) 67'

Stellenberg High School, Cape Town, South Africa
Attendance: 5,000+
Referee: Jack MacNeice (Irish)

== Players ==
=== SA schools ===
==== Current squad ====
The South African Schools squad was named for the 2026 Under-18 International Series against France, Ireland and England.

SA Schools U18 Squad 2026
Name	School	Union	Caps	Tries	Con	Pen	Points
Clement Makelele	Kearsney College	Sharks					
Matthew Prins	Outeniqua	SWD					
Ruben Lombard	Garsfontein	Blue Bulls					
Nicola Salamousas	Michaelhouse	Sharks					
Theodorus Boshoff	Maritzburg College	Sharks					
Iglesias Bruiners	Durban High School	Sharks					
Lwandile Mlaba	Westville	Sharks					
Juvan Burder	Stellenberg	Western Province					
Jean Dreyer	Paarl Gimnasium	Western Province					
Glodi Tshipamba	Jeppe	Golden Lions					
Nhlanhla Ndlovu	Kearsney College	Sharks					
Stefan van der Vyver	Garsfontein	Blue Bulls					
Jamie Wimble	Northwood	Sharks					
Jacobus de Villiers	Oakdale	SWD					
Mickyle Booise	Paarl Gimnasium	Western Province					
Luke Doyle	Graeme	Eastern Province					
Travis Pheiffer	Paul Roos Gymnasium	Western Province					
Achmat Behardien	Wynberg	Western Province					
Olwethu Kosani	Maritzburg College	Sharks					
Ethan Barker	Paarl Gimnasium	Western Province					
Erin Nelson	Graeme	Eastern Province					
Tiaan Basson	Paul Roos Gymnasium	Western Province					
Ncuthu Kepe	Queen's	Border					
Lamla Mgedezi	Grey College	Free State					
Ethan van Biljon	Stellenberg	Western Province					
Luxolo Sonkononkono	Westville	Sharks					

==== Previous squads ====
The following players played at previous editions of the U18 SA Schools International Rugby Competition:

2025 South Africa Under-18 rugby union team
Name	School	Union	Caps	Tries	Con	Pen	Points
Chinedu Amadi	King Edward VII School	Golden Lions	3	2			10
Clinton Agu	Noordheuwel High School	Golden Lions	2	1			5
Ethan Adams	Grey College	Free State	3	2			10
Jadrian Afrikaner	Westville Boys High	Sharks	3	2			10
Nathan Aneke	Durban High School	Sharks	0				0
JG Badenhorst	Grey College	Free State	3	1			5
Jayden Brits	Boland Landbou	Boland	3	1			5
Jacobus de Villiers	Oakdale	SWD	3	1			5
Gert Kemp	Paul Roos Gymnasium	Western Province	3	2			10
Keenan Myners	Outeniqua High School	SWD	1				0
AJ Meyer	Grey College	Free State	3				0
Zirk Meyer	Afrikaanse Hoër Seunskool	Blue Bulls	0				0
Lamla Mgedezi	Grey College	Free State	2	1			5
Lwandile Mlaba	Westville Boys High	Sharks	3				0
Markus Muller	Paarl Gimnasium	Western Province	3	3			15
Liyema Nela	Hilton College	Sharks	3		10	2	26
Josh Neill	Rondebosch Boys' High School	Western Province	3	1			5
Morne Noble	Wynberg Boys' High School	Western Province	3				0
Kai Pratt	Oakdale	SWD	3				0
Altus Rabe	Paul Roos Gymnasium	Western Province	3	1			5
Ruben Groenewald	Afrikaanse Hoër Seunskool	Blue Bulls	3		7		14
Thabiso Simelane	St Albans College	Golden Lions	3				0
Junaide Stuart	Garsfontein High School	Blue Bulls	3	2			10
Zekhethelo Siyaya	Westville Boys High	Sharks	3				0
Jordan Jooste	Paarl Boys' High School	Western Province	3				0
Jayden Joubert	Paarl Boys' High School	Western Province	3	1			5
Matthew van der Merwe	Rondebosch Boys' High School	Western Province	3				0
Luan van der Berg	Garsfontein	Blue Bulls	0				0
Christian Vorster	Oakdale	SWD	3	1			5
Wasi Vyambwera	Maritzburg College	Sharks	3				0

2024 South Africa Under-18 rugby union team
Name	School	Pts
Adan da Costa	Wynberg	0
Adeeb Borraine	Paul Roos	0
Aidan Botha	Maritzburg	0
AJ Meyer	Grey College	0
Alutha Wessi	Rondebosch	0
Alzeadon Felix	Grey College	0
Aqa Boqwana	DHS	4
Cecil Parsons	Voortrekker	0
Cheswill Jooste	Noordheuwel	15
Cruz Davey	Paarl Boys	0
Elgernon Meyer	Outeniqua	5
Esethu Mnebelele	KES	5
Ethan Adams	Grey College	0
James Schnetler	Garsfontein	0
Janco Purchase	Affies	0
JD Hattingh	Affies	0
Josh Mackenzie	Kingswood	0
Josh Neill	Rondebosch	0
Kebotile Maake	KES	0
Kuthadzo Rasivhaga	Jeppe	5
Luquobo Makwedini	Rondebosch Boys’ High	0
Mahle Sithole	DHS	0
Markus Muller	Paarl Gim	5
Oliver Reid	Paul Roos	0
Phiwayinkosi Khubeka	Maritzburg	0
Pieter van der Merwe	Grey College	0
Rambo Kubheka	Maritzburg	0
Riley Norton	Paul Roos	0
Rueben Kruger	Paul Roos	5
Siba Booi	N/A	0
Simphiwe Moyo	KES	13
Torren February	Wynberg	0
Ulrich van der Merwe	Helpmekaar	0
Vuyo Gwiji	Northwood	0
Yaqeen Ahmed	Wynberg	10
Zekhethelo Siyaya	Westville	10

2023 South Africa Under-18 rugby union team
Name	School	Pts
Batho Hlekani	Graeme	0
Cheswill Jooste	Noordheuwel	5
Christiaan van der Westhuizen	Grey College	0
Demitre Erasmus	Garsfontein	0
Divan Fuller	Paarl Boys	0
Dominic Malgas	Nico Malan	4
Gino Cupido	Strand	5
Haashim Pead	Bishops	0
Ian van der Merwe	Grey College	4
Imaani Pemba	Grey High	0
Jaco Grobbelaar	Fichardtpark	0
Jameel de Jongh	Paarl Boys	0
Janco Purchase	Affies	5
JC Mars	Paarl Boys	5
Jean Erasmus	Grey College	0
JJ Theron	Grey College	5
JT Kapank	Noordheuwel	0
Kyle Smith	Paarl Gim	8
Lithemba Mfupi	Glenwood	0
Luyanda Kunene	Maritzburg	5
Marno Stopforth	Grey College	0
Phiwayinkosi Khubeka	Maritzburg	0
Rambo Khubeka	Maritzburg	0
Ranon Fouche	Grey College	0
Riley Norton	Paul Roos	0
Ruan Welman	Helpmekaar	0
Scott Nel	Paarl Boys	5
Simphiwe Ngobese	DHS	0
Sipho Mnebelele	KES	0
Thando Biyela	KES	0
Ulrich van der Westhuizen	Monument	0
Xola Nyali	Wynberg	0

2022 South Africa Under-18 rugby union team
Name	School	Pts
Alfondso Isaacs	Grey College	0
Bruce Sherwood	Bishops	5
Caleb Abrahams	Grey College	5
Casper Badenhorst	Grey College	0
Ethan Bester	Hilton	10
Jack Waterhouse	Hilton	5
JC Mars	Paarl Boys	0
JF van Heerden	Grey College	0
Joel Leotlela	St Johns	5
Joshua Boulle	St Johns	0
Jurenzo Julius	Paul Roos	0
Lilitha Matziliza		0
Litelihle Bester	Maritzburg College	10
Liyema Ntshanga	Westville	0
Luca Bakkes	Paarl Gim	5
Lukas Meyer	Grey College	0
Matthew Fick	Paarl Boys	0
Michail Damon	Garsfontein	0
Nic Snyman	Hilton	0
Reno Hirst		0
Ruan Swart	Outeniqua	0
Sha Jehaan de Jongh	Paarl Boys	10
Sibabalwe Mahashe	Hudson Park	0
Sifiso Magwaza	Monument	0
Stehan Heymans	Affies	23
Steven Nel	Garsfontein	5
Thabang Mpafi	KES	0
Thomas Dyer	Hilton	10
Thurlon Williams	Paarl Boys	33
Zachary Porthen	Wynberg	0

2021 South Africa Under-18 rugby union team
Name	School	Pts
Abongile Ngandi	Graeme	0
Abu Ndabambi	Paarl Boys	0
Alfondso Isaacs	Grey College	0
Bruce Sherwood	Bishops	0
Bryce Calvert	Westville	0
Caleb Abrahams	Grey College	0
Compion von Ludwig	Paarl Boys	0
Corne Lavagna	Paarl Gim	0
Damian Markus	Stellenebrg	0
Dian Heunis	Oakdale	0
Diego Cupido	Helpmekaar	0
Gcino Mdlestshe	Westville	0
Hennie Sieberhagen	Paarl Gim	0
Imad Khan	Bishops	0
Jan-Hendrik Gouws	Volkskool EP	0
Jean Smith	Grey College	0
Jeanre Breitenbach	Grey College	0
JF van Heerden	Grey College	0
Johan Louw	Grey College	0
Katlego Letebele	KES	0
Keagan Smith	Paarl Boys	0
Liam Koen	Paarl Gim	0
Liselihle Maphekhula	Graeme	0
Logan Opperman	Paarl Gim	0
Luca Bakkes	Paarl Gim	0
Neels Volschenk	Grey College	0
Niel le Roux	Oakdale	0
PA van Niekerk	Paarl Gim	0
Pathu Ganyane	Glenwood	0
Paul de Villiers	Oakdale	0
Philip Kleynhans	Oakdale	0
Risima SAmbo	Affies	0
SAndile Nzuza	Glenwood	0
Sibabalwe Mahashe	Hudson Park	0
Sifiso Magwaza	Monument	0
Stiaan de Bruyn	Affies	0
Suleiman Hartzenberg	Bishops	0
Zachary Porthen	Wynberg	0

2019 South Africa Under-18 rugby union team
Name	School	Pts
Andre Venter	Grey College	5
Blaine Golden	Glenwood	0
Boldwin Hansen	Hermanus	0
Bryan le Roux	Rondebosch	0
Connor Evans	Bishops	0
Dylan Alexander	Paarl Gim	10
Dylan de Leeuw	Paul Roos	0
George Cronje	Grey College	0
Geraldo Flusk	Garsfontein	0
Gideon van Wyk	Paarl Boys	10
Henco van Wyk	Monument	15
Jacques Goosen	Selborne	5
Jan-Hendrik Wessels	Grey College	10
Jarrod Taylor	Selborne	5
Jurich Claasens	Garsfontein	13
Kean Meadon	Paarl Boys	21
Keane Galant	Drostdy	5
Keketso Morabe	Welkom Gim	0
Mntungwa Mapantsela	Selborne	0
Okuhle Siyeni	Westville	0
Quan Horn	Paarl Boys	0
Sibusiso Shongwe	Jeppe	0
Simon Miller	St Albans	0
Siyemukela Ndlovu	Northwood	0
Tarquin Manuel	Stellenberg	0
Tyler Bocks	Paarl Boys	0
Wandile Hlope	Maritzburg College	0
Zeilinga Strydom	Garsfontein	5

2018 South Africa Under-18 rugby union team
Name	School	Pts
Adrian Alberts	Paarl Boys	0
Banele Mthenjane	Nelspruit	0
Brendan Venter	Paul Roos	0
Celimpilo Gumede	DHS	5
Darren Hendricks	Boland Landbou	20
De Wet Marais	Grey College	0
Dewald Donald	Affies	0
Emile van Heerden	Paarl Boys	0
Evan Roos	Paarl Boys	0
Hanru Jacobs	Paul Roos	0
Jacobus Agenbag	Grey College	0
Jacques Goosen	Selborne	5
Jarrod Taylor	Selborne	0
Jean-Jacques Kotze	Paul Roos	10
Juan Mostert	Paul Roos	10
Jurich Claasens	Garsfontein	5
Keketso Morabe	Welkom Gim	0
Lionel April	Hermanus High	0
Lunga Ncube	Glenwood	0
Lwandile Menze	DHS	0
Mihlali Mgolodela	Rondebosch	0
Mnombo Zwelindaba	Selborne	5
Muzilikazi Manyike	Jeppe	5
Rynhardt Jonker	Glenwood	0
Sibabalwe Xamlashe	—	5
Sibusiso SAngweni	Kearsney	0
Stravino Jacobs	Paarl Gim	5
Thabiso Mdletshe	Glenwood	0
Thomas Bursey	Selborne	6
Tristan Dullisear	Monument	5
Wyclef Vlitoor	Grey College	0

2017 South Africa Under-18 rugby union team
Name	School	Pts
Adrian Alberts	Paarl Boys	0
Andrew Kota	Welkom Gim	7
Asenathi Ntlabakanye	St Stithians College	0
Banele Mthejane	Nelspruit	0
Celimpilo Gumede	DHS	0
Christen van Niekerk	Monument	0
Christopher Schreuder	Grey College	11
Conan Le Fleur	Glenwood	0
Diego Appolis	Garsfontein	5
Dylan Richardson	Kearsney	0
Fez Mbatha	Maritzburg College	0
Henco Martins	Paarl Gim	5
Jaden Hendrikse	Glenwood	0
JJ van der Mescht	Glenwood	0
Jordan Clarke	Glenwood	0
Keagan Glade	KES	0
Kennedy Mpeku	KES	5
Mark Snyman	Helpmekaar	5
Morne Brandon	Monument	5
Muller du Plessis	Paarl Gim	10
Nkosi Masuku	Parktown Boys	0
Phepsi Buthelezi	DHS	0
Rikus Pretorius	Grey College	0
Ruhann Greyling	Grey College	0
SAnele Nohamba	DHS	4
Stephan van der Bank	Nelspruit	0
Travis Gordon	KES	0
Vian Fourie	Paarl Boys	0
Yanga Hlalu	KES	0

2016 South Africa Under-18 rugby union team
Name	School	Pts
Ben-Jason Dixon	Paul Roos	0
Charl Serdyn	Paarl Boys	0
Damian Willemse	Paul Roos	5
Dan Jooste	Paarl Boys	0
Emilio Adonis	Garsfontein	0
Gianni Lombard	Paarl Boys	26
JC Pretorius	HTS Middleburg	0
Johan Neethling	Paarl Boys	0
Kewzi Mafu	Grey High	0
Khanya Ncusane	Paarl Boys	0
Manuel Rass	Paarl Boys	0
Mike Mavovana	Rondebosch	5
Muller du Plessis	Paarl Gim	10
Muller Uys	Paarl Gim	0
Nathan McBeth	Monument	0
PJ Botha	Monument	5
Reece Bezuidenhout	Paarl Boys	0
Rewan de Swardt	Affies	3
Rewan Kruger	Grey College	0
Richman Gora	Welkom Gim	0
Rikus Pretorius	Grey College	5
SAlmaan Moerat	Paarl Boys	15
SAzi SAndi	St Andrews	0
Sihle Njezula	Grey High	0
Wandisile Simelane	Jeppe	5

2015 South Africa Under-18 rugby union team
Name	School	Pts
Andell Loubser	Menlopark	0
Ashwyn Adams	Rondebosch	0
Cabous Eloff	Affies	0
Carlü SAdie	Bellville	0
Cobus Wiese	Upington	0
Curwin Bosch	Grey High	42
Damian Willemse	Paul Roos	0
Davids Brits	Selborne	0
Dewald Maritz	Nelspruit	0
Embrose Papier	Garsfontein	10
Ernst van Rhyn	Paarl Gim	0
Hacjivah Dayimani	Jeppe	5
Heino Bezuidenhout	Daniel Pienaar	0
Hendré Stassen	EG Jansen	0
Johan Grobbelaar	Paarl Gim	5
Johan Visser	Paarl Gim	0
Jondre Williams	Boland Landbou	0
Joshua Vermeulen	Paul Roos	0
Kwezi Mafu	Grey High	0
Manie Libbok	Outeniqua	0
Manuel Rass	Paarl Boys	0
Nico Leonard	Paul Roos	0
Nico Peyper	EG Jansen	0
Ruben de Villiers	Paarl Boys	5
Ruben van Heerden	Affies	0
SAlmaan Moerat	Paarl Boys	0
Stedman Gans	Waterkloof	10
Wandisile Simelane	Jeppe	0
Zain Davids	Rondebosch	0

2014 South Africa Under-18 rugby union team
Name	School	Pts
Andell Loubser	Menlopark	10
Arnold Gerber	Menlopark	0
Aston Fortuin	Southdowns	5
Barend Smit	HTS Middleburg	5
Cobus Wiese	Upington	0
Curwin Bosch	Grey High	15
Edmund Rheeder	Klerksdorp	0
Eduan Keyter	Affies	0
Eduard Zandberg	Outeniqua	0
Embrose Papier	Garsfontein	5
Heino Bezuidenhout	Daniel Pienaar	5
Ignatius Prinsloo	Grey College	0
Jaco Coetzee	Glenwood	0
Jaco Willemse	Paarl Gim	5
Jan-Henning Campher	Eldoraigne	0
Jerry Danquah	Queens	0
JT Jackson	Oakdale	10
Junior Pokomela	Grey High	0
Keanu Vers	Grey High	10
Kenny van Niekerk	Glenwood	0
Le Roux Baard	Outeniqua	0
Lupumlo Mguca	Daniel Pienaar	0
Marco Jansen van Vuren	Transvalia	0
Michael Kumbirai	St Albans	0
Morné Joubert	Glenwood	0
Nazo Nkala	Welkom Gim	0
Ngonidzashe Chidoma	Northwood	0
SArel-Marco Smit	Eldoraigne	0
Tinus de Beer	Waterkloof	20
Victor Maruping	Louis Botha	0

2013 South Africa Under-18 rugby union team
Name	School	Pts
Abongile Nonkontwana	St Albans	0
Brandon Thompson	Ermelo	10
Conraad van Vuuren	Nelspruit	0
Dan du Plessis	Paarl Boys	0
Dan du Preez	Kearsney	0
Daniël du Plessis	Paul Roos	0
Dewald Human	Outeniqua	7
Duhan van der Merwe	Outeniqua	15
EW Viljoen	Grey College	0
Fiffy Rampeta	Louis Botha	0
Francois Steyn	Affies	0
Grant Hermanus	Paarl Gim	3
Jacques Vermeulen	Paarl Gim	0
JD Schickerling	Paarl Gim	0
Jean-Luc du Preez	Kearsney	5
Joseph Dweba	Florida	0
Jurie Linde	Affies	0
Justin Phillips	Waterkloof	0
Leolin Zas	Hermanus	5
Malcolm Jaer	Brandwag EP	0
Marco Jansen van Vuren	Transvalia	0
Ox Nche	Louis Botha	0
PJ Toerien	Garsfontein	0
Remu Malan	Outeniqua	0
RG Snyman	Affies	0
Rikus Bothma	Paarl Gim	5
Ruan Kramer	Grey College	0
Thabani Mtsi	Selborne	0
Thomas du Toit	Paarl Boys	0
Warrick Gelant	Outeniqua	0

2012 South Africa Under-18 rugby union team
Name	School	Pts
Abongile Nonkontwana	St Albans	0
Aidon Davis	Daniel Pienaar	0
Akhona Sihunu	Dale College	0
Dan du Preez	Kearsney	0
Dayan van der Westhuizen	Centurion	5
Duhan van der Merwe	Outeniqua	0
Francois Esterhuizen	Overberg	0
Gideon Koegelenberg	Hugenote	0
Handré Pollard	Paarl Gimnasium	37
Jano Venter	HTS Middelburg	0
JD Schickerling	Paarl Gimnasium	0
Jean-Luc du Preez	Kearsney	0
Jesse Kriel	Maritzburg College	0
Jixie Molapo	Ben Vorster	5
Jurie Linde	Affies	0
Justin Phillips	Waterkloof	0
Malcolm Marx	King Edward VII School	0
Nico Janse van Rensburg	Affies	0
Ox Nché	Louis Botha	0
Pierre Schoeman	Affies	0
Rohan Janse van Rensburg	Waterkloof	15
Ryno Eksteen	Affies	0
SAndile Kubeka	Kearsney	0
Sergeal Petersen	Grey High	15
Thabo Mabuza	Centurion	0
Warrick Gelant	Outeniqua	0
Wilco Louw	Drostdy	0

=== SA schools academy ===
==== Current squad ====
SA Schools Academy U18 Squad 2025
Name	School	Union	Caps	Tries	Con	Pen	Points
Andre Poulton	Jeppe	Golden Lions	0				0
Andile Ndlovu	Kearsney	Sharks	1				0
Nhlanhla Ndlovu	Kearsney	Sharks	1				0
Keenan Myners	Outeniqua	SWD	3				0
Bernhard du Toit	Paarl Boys' High School	Western Province	3				0
Diaan Augustyn	Oakdale	SWD	3				0
Juvan Burden	Stellenberg	Western Province	1				0
Caleb Koeberg	Paul Roos Gymnasium	Western Province	0				0
Quintin Potgieter	Paarl Gimnasium	Western Province	3	2			10
Stefan McDonald	Affies	Blue Bulls	0				0
Jayden Brits	Boland Landbou	Boland	0				0
Jeandre Uithaler	Noordheuwel	Golden Lions	3		11	1	25
Ncuthu Kepe	Queen's College	EP	3	2			10
Christian Vorster	Oakdale	SWD	0				0
Erin Nelson	Graeme College	EP	3	1			5
Lucritia Magua	Graeme College	EP	0				0
Junade Pasensie	Garsfontein	Blue Bulls	3	2			10
Thomas Muller	Paarl Boys' High School	Western Province	3	2			10
Jeffrey Singo	Pretoria Boys High School	Blue Bulls	3	1			5
JG Badenhorst	Grey College	Free State	0				0
Deon Botes	Affies	Blue Bulls	3				0
Lian Terblanche	Northwood	Sharks	3				0
Liam Lightly	Oakdale	SWD	3				0
Zirk Meyer	Affies	Blue Bulls	3				0
Briint Davids	Milnerton	Western Province	3				0
Mickyle Booise	Paarl Gimnasium	Western Province	3				0
Ethan van Biljon	Stellenberg	Western Province	3				0
Jeneall Davids	Paarl Boys' High School	Western Province	3				0
Pieter Cilliers	Paarl Gimnasium	Western Province	3				0
Toriq Schambreel	Grey College	Free State	0				0
Lizwe Mthethwa	Glenwood	Sharks	3	1			5
Migael Turner	Paarl Gimnasium	Western Province	3	1			5
Reinhart Viljoen	Oakdale	SWD	3	2			10
Sbabalwe Magwebu	Queen's College	EP	2				0
Nathan Aneke	Durban High School	Sharks	3	1			5
Jadon Ocks	Boland Landbou	Boland	0				0

==== Previous squads ====
The following players played for the South Africa Schools Academy at previous U18 SA Schools International Rugby Competitions:

SA Schools U18 Academy 2024
Name	School
Aka Boqwana	Durban High School
Ntsako Ndlovu	Pretoria Boys’ High
Markus Muller	Paarl Gimnasium
Zingce Simka	Durban High School
Junaid Stuart	Garsfontein
Luan Giliomee	Charlie Hofmeyr
Hendré Schoeman	Affies
Reuben Kruger	Paul Roos Gimnasium
Sipho Nonyalela	Kingswood College
Briint Davids	Milnerton
JD Hattingh	Affies
Tom Barnard	Rondebosch Boys’ High
Duwan Potgieter	EG Jansen
Liam Van Wyk	Grey College
Jordan Jooste	Paarl Boys’ High
Xabiso Mkiva	Wynberg Boys’ High
André Poulton	Jeppe High School for Boys
Luquobo Makwedini	Rondebosch Boys’ High
Ruan Viviers	Boland Landbou
Risima Khosa	Jeppe High School for Boys
Zaide-Leigh Rippenaar	EG Jansen
Philip McLaren	Grey College
Viaan Mentoor	Paarl Boys’ High
Dylan Miller	Rondebosch
Brooklyn Newman	Garsfontein
Kurt Coetzee	Oakdale Landbou
Gcina Puzi	Selborne College

== Coaches ==
=== Coach results ===
* Stats correct as of 16 August 2026.

Name	Years	Tests	Won	Drew	Lost	Win percent	Accomplishments
(South Africa) Chris October	2012–2013	6	6	0	0	100%	2012 & 2013 U18 International Series Winners
(South Africa) Hein Kriek	2014–2015	6	5	0	1	83%	2015 U18 International Series Winners
(South Africa) Lance Sendin	2016–2017	6	3	0	3	50%	2016 U18 International Series Winners
(South Africa) Sean Erasmus	2018	2	2	0	0	100%	2018 U18 International Series Winners
(South Africa) Mzwakhe Nkosi	2019–2020	3	3	0	0	100%	2019 U18 International Series Winners
(South Africa) Katleho Lynch	2022–2023	5	4	0	1	27%	2022 U18 International Series Winners
(South Africa) James Winstanley	2024	2	2	0	0	17%	2024 U18 International Series Winners
(South Africa) Lwazi Zangqa	2025–present	6	6	0	0	100%	2026 U18 International Series Winners
