= 2025 U18 International Series =

International rugby union competition

- Date: 18-16 August 2025
- Champions: South Africa U18
- Matches played: 9
- Tries scored: 79 (average 8.8 per match)
- Top point scorer: Liyema Nela (26)
- Top try scorer: Markus Muller (3)

The 2025 U18 International Series is an international schools rugby union competition, part of the Under-18 International Series. The latest series was held in South Africa between 8 August and 16 August 2025. It featured under-18 national teams from South Africa, England, France, Georgia, and Ireland.

South Africa’s U18 team dominated the round-robin fixtures, winning all their matches against France, Ireland, and England. The competition showcased the strength of South Africa’s youth development system, with highly competitive matches across all five nations.

== Competition rules and information ==
Each team played three matches in a round-robin format. Teams were awarded four points for a win and two points for a draw. Bonus points were awarded for scoring four or more tries in a match and for losing by seven points or fewer. Rankings were determined by total log points, then points difference (points scored minus points conceded). There were no semifinals or finals; the overall winner was the team with the highest points at the end of the round-robin.

== Teams ==
Locations of European U18 teams

The teams that played in the 2025 U18 International Series are:

2025 U18 International Series teams
| Team | Country |
|---|---|
| South Africa U18 | South Africa |
| England U18 | England |
| France U18 | France |
| Georgia U18 | Georgia |
| Ireland U18 | Ireland |

== Series summary ==
South Africa went unbeaten across all three matches in the series, demonstrating a dominant performance against top European and Georgian youth teams. The round-robin format ensured that each team played competitive matches against multiple nations, highlighting the growing standard of under-18 international rugby in South Africa.

== Final standings ==
The final log for the 2025 U18 International Series was:

2025 U18 International Series standings
| Pos | Team | P | W | D | L | PF | PA | PD |
|---|---|---|---|---|---|---|---|---|
| 1 | South Africa U18 | 3 | 3 | 0 | 0 | 169 | 64 | +105 |
| 2 | France U18 | 3 | 2 | 0 | 1 | 92 | 86 | +6 |
| 3 | Ireland U18 | 3 | 1 | 1 | 1 | 65 | 52 | +13 |
| 4 | Georgia U18 | 3 | 1 | 1 | 1 | 67 | 108 | −41 |
| 5 | South Africa ‘A U18 | 3 | 1 | 0 | 2 | 107 | 98 | +9 |
| 6 | England U18 | 3 | 0 | 0 | 3 | 75 | 158 | −83 |

== Matches ==
The results from the 2025 Under-18 International Series were:

8 August 2025
11h30

| South Africa 'A' | 36–39 | Ireland |
| Try: Jeffrey Singo, Reinhart Viljoen(2), Ncutu Kepe, Lizwe Mthethwa; Con: Jeandre Uithaler(4); Pen: Jeandre Uithaler(1) | Report | Try: Lee Fitzpatrick(2), Bernard White(2), Alex Lautsou; Con: Luke Coffey(2), Connor McVicker (2); Pen: Connor McVicker(1) |

Hoërskool Durbanville, Cape Town

8 August 2025
15h30

| South Africa | 43–21 | France |
| Try: Chinedu Amadi(2), Gert Kemp, Markus Muller, Jacobus de Villiers, Junaide Stuart; Con: Liyema Nela(4), Ruben Groenewald; Pen: Liyema Nela(1) | Report | Try: Auguste Albuisson, Christian Mendes Tani(2); Con: Timeo Gillouin-Lemaire(1), Valentin Bouju (2) |

Hoërskool Durbanville, Cape Town

8 August 2025
11h30

| Georgia | 35-31 | England |
| | Report |

Hoërskool Durbanville, Cape Town

12 August 2025
11h30

| South Africa 'A' | 57–19 | Georgia |
| Try: Thomas Muller, Migael Turner, Ncutu Kepe, Junade Pasensie(2), Quintin Potgieter(2), Erin Nelson, Nathan Aneke; Con: Jeandre Uithaler(6) | Report | Try: Pitskhelauri Gocha, Balanchivadze Nikoloz, Gabriel Razmadze; Con: Butshrikidze Levani(2) |

Hoër Landbouskool Boland, Paarl

12 August 2025
11h30

| South Africa | 45–5 | Ireland |
| Try: Jayden Joubert, Clinton Agu, Jayden Brits, Lamla Mgedezi, Jadrian Afrikaner, Ethan Adams, Penalty try Con: Ruben Groenewald (2), Liyema Nela (2) | Report | Try: Harry Goslin |

Hoër Landbouskool Boland, Paarl

8 August 2025
11h30

| England | 20-51 | France |
| | Report |

Hoër Landbouskool Boland, Paarl

16 August 2025
11h30

| South Africa 'A' | 14–40 | France |
| Try: Thomas Muller, Penalty Try; Con: Jeandre Uithaler(1) | Report | Try: Lourenzo Laouna, Malobe Mbaye, Andoni Echegaray, Gaetan Ngassa Manac’h, Yanis Brosset; Con: Timeo Gillouin Lemaire(1), Louis Favrau(2); Pen: Gillouin-Lemaire(2), Favrau(1) |

Paarl Gimnasium, Paarl

16 August 2025
15h30

| South Africa | 69–24 | England |
| Try: Jadriaan Afrikaner, Gert Kemp, Markus Muller(2), Ethan Adams, Junaide Stuart, JG Badenhorst, Altus Rabe, Josh Neill, Christian Vorster; Con: Liyema Nela(4), Ruben Groenewald(4); Pen: Liyema Nela(1) | Report | Try: Lawrence Ogbonnaya, Henry Horsfall, Declan Treacey; Con: Hugh Shields(1), Oscar Talbot(1); Pen: Hugh Shields(1) |

Paarl Gimnasium, Paarl

8 August 2025
11h30

| Ireland | 13-13 | Georgia |
| | Report |

Paarl Gimnasium, Paarl

== Standouts ==
The standouts for the 2025 U18 International Rugby Series were as follows:

2025 Top Performers
| Top side: | SA Schools |
| Top Points Scorer: | Liyema Nela (26), SA Schools |
| Top try Scorer: | Markus Muller (3), SA Schools |
