= 2022 U18 International Series =

International rugby union competition

- Date: 19–27 August 2022
- Champions: South Africa
- Matches played: 6
- Tries scored: 47 (average 7.8 per match)
- Top point scorer: Thurlon Williams (33), SA U18
- Top try scorer: Juan Small (3), SA U18

The 2022 U18 International Series is an international schools rugby union competition, part of the Under-18 International Series. The 2022 series was held in South Africa between 19 August and 27 August 2022. It featured under-18 national teams from South Africa, England, France, and a South African ‘A Schools side.

== Teams ==
Locations of European U18 teams

The teams that played in the 2022 U18 International Series are:

2022 U18 International Series teams
Team	Country
South Africa U18	South Africa
England U18	England
France U18	France
South Africa ‘A U18	South Africa ‘A

== Matches ==
The results from the 2022 Under-18 International Series were:

19 August 2022

South Africa 'A'	23–26	France
Try: Juan Smal, Divan Fuller; Con: Liam Koen (2); Pen: Liam Koen (3)	Report	Try: Jon Echegaray, Babtiste Narmand, Thibualt Motassi Dibongue, Xan Mousques; Con: Yani Brillant (2), Oliver Cowie

Hoërskool Paarl Gimnasium, Paarl

19 August 2022

South Africa	40–24	England
Try: Ethan Bester, Caleb Abrahams, Luca Bakkes, Jack Waterhouse; Con: Stehan Heymans (3), Thurlon Williams; Pen: Stehan Heymans (4)	Report	Try: Jack Bennet, Loic Keasey (2); Con: Rory Taylor (3); Pen: Rory Taylor

Hoërskool Paarl Gimnasium, Paarl

23 August 2022

South Africa 'A'	34–36	England
Try: Zukisane Tom, Sesethu Mpaka (2), Gino Cupido; Con: Bradley Giddy (4); Pen: Bradley Giddy	Report	Try: Will Glister, Will Owen, Billy Sela (2), Ben Redshaw; Con: Raff Weston, Rory Taylor (3); Pen: Rory Taylor

Hoërskool Paarl Gimnasium, Paarl

23 August 2022

South Africa	49–17	France
Try: Sha-Jehaan de Jongh (2), Litelihle Bester (2), Bruce Sherwood, Steven Nel; Con: Thurlon Williams (5); Pen: Thurlon Williams (3)	Report	Try: Sialevailea Tolofua, Jon Echegaray; Con: Kalvin Gourgues (2); Pen: Kalvin Gourgues

Hoërskool Paarl Gimnasium, Paarl

27 August 2022

South Africa 'A'	15–20	France
Try: Juan Smal (2); Con: Liam Koen; Pen: Liam Koen	Report	Try: Lilou Brun Bourdi, Baptiste Narmand, Enzo Fernandes; Con: Kalvin Gourgues; Pen: Kalvin Gourgues

Hoërskool Paarl Gimnasium, Paarl

27 August 2022

South Africa	44–41	England
Try: Thomas Dyer (2), Ethan Bester, Joel Leotlela, Penalty try Con: Thurlon Williams (3), Stehan Heymans; Pen: Thurlon Williams (2), Stehan Heymans	Report	Try: Jack Bennett, Louie Trevett, Will Glister, Loic Keasey, Henry Pollock, Archie McParland, George Edson; Con: Sean Kerr (3)

Hoërskool Paarl Gimnasium, Paarl

== Standouts ==
The standouts for the 2022 U18 International Rugby Series were as follows:

2022 Top Performers
Top side:	South Africa U18
Top points scorer:	Thurlon Williams (33), SA U18
Top try scorer:	Juan Small (3), SA U18
