= Jacques Goosen =

South African rugby union player

- Full name: Jacques Goosen
- Born: 1 January 2001 (age 25) East London, South Africa
- Height: 1.81 m (5 ft 11 in)
- Weight: 96 kg (212 lb)
- School: Selborne College
- University: Stellenbosch University

Rugby union career
- Position: Hooker
- Current team: Free State Cheetahs
Senior career
Years	Team	Apps	(Points)
2022	Western Province	2	(0)
2023–	Free State Cheetahs	2	(0)
- Correct as of 23 July 2022
International career
Years	Team	Apps	(Points)
2019	South Africa U18	0	(0)

Jacques Goosen (born 1 January 2001) is a South African rugby union player for the Western Province in the Currie Cup. His regular position is hooker.

Goosen was named in the Western Province side for the 2022 Currie Cup Premier Division. He made his Currie Cup debut for the Western Province against the Blue Bulls in Round 2 of the 2022 Currie Cup Premier Division.
