= Handré Pollard =

South African rugby union player

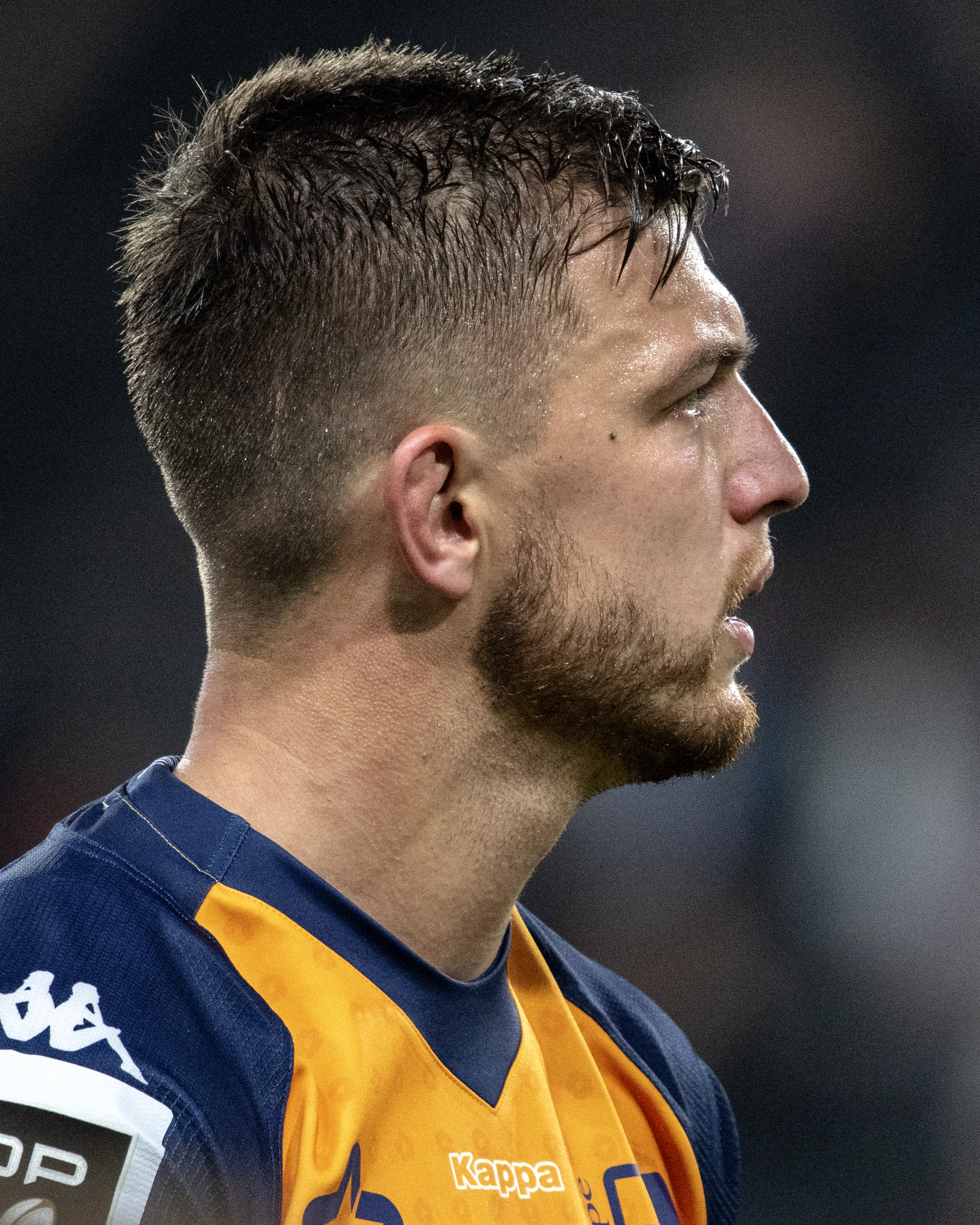
- Pollard in 2019
- Born: 11 March 1994 (age 32) Somerset West, Cape Province, South Africa
- Height: 189 cm (6 ft 2 in)
- Weight: 98 kg (216 lb; 15 st 6 lb)
- School: Paarl Gimnasium
- University: University of Pretoria

Rugby union career
- Position(s): Fly-half, Centre
- Current team: Bulls
Youth career
- 2007–2012: Western Province
Amateur team(s)
Years	Team	Apps	(Points)
2013	UP Tuks	8	(52)
Senior career
Years	Team	Apps	(Points)
2013–2017	Blue Bulls	12	(94)
2014–2019	Bulls	62	(629)
2015–2016	Red Hurricanes Osaka	7	(29)
2019–2022	Montpellier	29	(175)
2022–2025	Leicester Tigers	54	(480)
2025–	Bulls	23	(197)
- Correct as of 24 October 2026
International career
Years	Team	Apps	(Points)
2012	South Africa Schools	3	(37)
2012–2014	South Africa U20	14	(141)
2014–	South Africa	88	(844)
- Correct as of 1 October 2026
Medal record
Men's rugby union
Representing South Africa
Rugby World Cup
Bronze medal – third place	2015 England	Squad
Gold medal – first place	2019 Japan	Squad
Gold medal – first place	2023 France	Squad

Handré Pollard (born 11 March 1994) is a South African professional rugby union player who currently plays for the Bulls in the United Rugby Championship (URC) and the South Africa national team. His regular playing positions are fly-half, where he started for South Africa in their 2019 Rugby World Cup Final win, and inside-centre. He has previously played for the Blue Bulls in his native South Africa, Osaka Red Hurricanes in Japan, Montpellier in France, and Leicester Tigers in England's Premiership Rugby.

He is one of 43 players to have won the Rugby World Cup on multiple occasions, 24 of whom are South Africans.

== Rugby career ==
=== Youth ===
Pollard earned a provincial call-up as early as primary school level, when he was selected in the Western Province squad for the Under-13 Craven Week competition in 2007. He also represented them at the Under-16 Grant Khomo Week in 2010, before playing at the Under-18 Craven Week competitions in 2011 and 2012. He also captained the SA schools under 18 side both in 2011 and 2012.

=== Professional career ===
==== Bulls / Blue Bulls / UP ====
In July 2012, it was announced that Pollard would make the move to Gauteng to join Pretoria-based team the Blue Bulls at the start of the 2013 season. His first involvement in rugby in Pretoria came for university side UP Tuks during the 2013 Varsity Cup competition. He did not play in the first match of the season, but then made three substitute appearances in their next three matches before being selected in the run-on side for their last three matches in the round-robin stage, the semi-final and the final, starting all those matches as inside centre. He was the main kicker for the UP Tuks team and scored 68 points in his side's run to the final, making him the tournament's second-highest points scorer behind UJ's Kobus de Kock. He was also a key player in the final of the competition as he kicked five conversions and a penalty to contribute 17 points in UP Tuks' 44–5 victory as they retained the trophy they won in 2012 Varsity Cup.

During the 2013 Varsity Cup season, Pollard was also included in the Blue Bulls side that participated in the 2013 Vodacom Cup competition. He made his provincial debut for the Blue Bulls on 9 March 2013 against Griquas in Kimberley. He came off the bench in the 62nd minute and scored two late conversions in their 40–32 victory. His first start for the Blue Bulls came after the 2013 Varsity Cup, when he was named in the run-on side for their match against the Eastern Province Kings in the quarter final of the competition. He scored eleven points, but could not prevent his side slipping to a 31–34 defeat.

In June 2013, after signing a contract extension to keep him at the Blue Bulls until 2017, Pollard was also named in their Currie Cup side for the 2013 Currie Cup Premier Division season. He made his Currie Cup debut on 31 August 2013, starting for the Blue Bulls in their match against the Sharks in Durban. Despite getting his first Currie Cup points after just six minutes – converting an Akona Ndungane try – the Blue Bulls suffered a 34–18 defeat in that match. Pollard started a total of six matches in this competition, scoring 62 points to finish as the Blue Bulls' top points scorer in the competition and eighth overall and also made four appearances for the Blue Bulls U21 side in the 2013 Under-21 Provincial Championship, scoring 52 points.

Pollard was included in the Bulls squad for the 2014 Super Rugby season and made his debut in the first round of the competition in a 31–16 defeat to the Sharks in Durban, also scoring his first Super Rugby points by kicking a late conversion. Initially used mainly as a substitute, he made his first Super Rugby start during their Round 12 match against South African rivals the Cheetahs. Pollard had an eventful match, being sent to the sin-bin in the first half and contributing ten points with the boot as the Bulls ran out 26–21 winners.

In 2015, Pollard extended his contract with the Blue Bulls until the end of the 2019 season.

==== NTT Docomo Red Hurricanes Osaka ====
In June 2015, the Blue Bulls announced that Pollard would join Japanese Top League side NTT DoCoMo Red Hurricanes Osaka on a three-month deal between November 2015 and January 2016 for the 2015–16 Top League season, but would return to the Bulls prior to the 2016 Super Rugby season. This was later confirmed by the Japanese side.

==== Montpellier ====
In May 2019, the Blue Bulls confirmed that Pollard would join Top 14 side Montpellier after the 2019 Rugby World Cup, having expressed his desire to continue his playing career in France during discussions about the renewal of his contract. After announcing his departure Pollard continued to feature for Montpellier, eventually featuring from the bench as they won their first ever Top 14 competition in a 29–10 win over Castres in the final.

==== Leicester Tigers ====
In December 2021, Leicester Tigers confirmed they had signed Pollard from Top 14 side Montpellier at the end of the 2021/22 season. Pollard joined Tigers following the departure of George Ford to Sale Sharks. Pollard made his Leicester debut as a replacement on 1 October 2022 in a 51–18 defeat to Saracens.

==== Return to Bulls ====
On 2 March 2025, it was confirmed that Pollard would return home to South Africa to rejoin the Bulls in the URC competition on a lucrative offer ahead of the 2025-26 season.

== International career ==
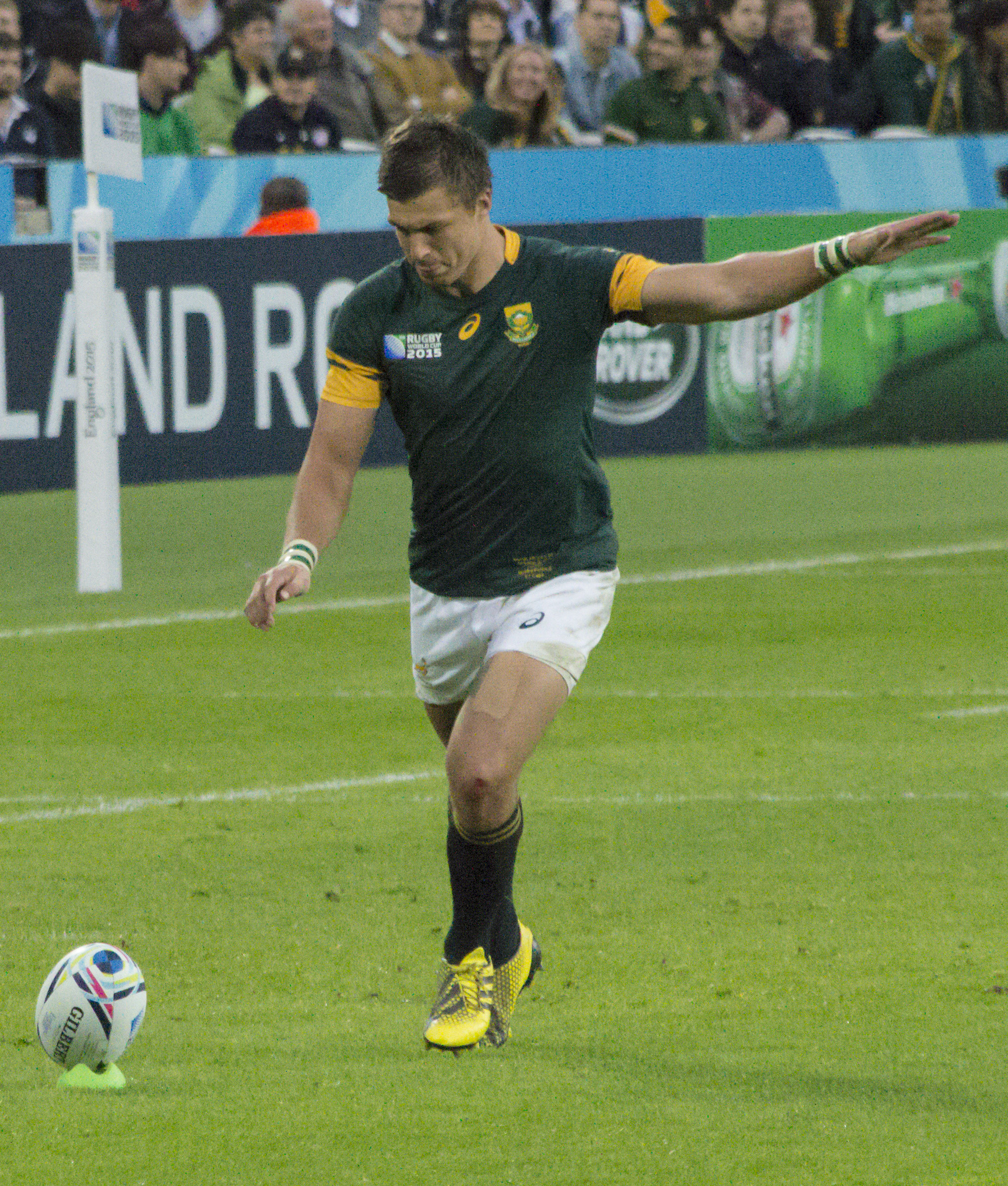
Pollard kicking for South Africa at the 2015 Rugby World Cup.

=== South Africa Schools ===
Pollard was included in a South African Schools side in 2012, where he scored 37 points in three appearances against France, Wales and England.

=== South Africa Under-20 ===
==== 2012 Junior World Championship ====
Pollard earned a call-up to the South African Under-20 team that won the 2012 IRB Junior World Championship on home soil. Despite not playing in their first match against Ireland, he started their remaining four matches. He kicked five conversions in their match against Italy and four conversions in their match against England to help secure a semi-final berth for South Africa. Three conversions and two penalties followed in their 35–3 semi-final victory over Argentina to see the Baby Boks through to their first ever final against four-time champions New Zealand. Once again, the boot of Pollard was largely responsible for their 22–16 victory in the final as he kicked four penalties and a drop-goal to lift the trophy for South Africa for the first time. Pollard finished as fourth top scorer overall in the competition with 42 points.

==== 2013 Junior World Championship ====
Pollard was included in a training group that toured Argentina in preparation for the 2013 IRB Junior World Championship before being included in the final squad for the 2013 IRB Junior World Championship in France. Playing at inside centre, Pollard's kicking let him down in their 97–0 demolition of the United States in their opening match, scoring a penalty and one conversion out of six attempts before the kicking duties passed to Robert du Preez. He did not kick at all in their match against England, but a switch back to fly-half for their final match against hosts France saw Pollard contribute eleven points with the boot as they won the match 26–19 to top their pool and qualify for a semi-final against Wales. Wales scored an 18–17 victory over the defending champions in their semi-final match with Pollard scoring seven points. He rounded off his tournament by kicking a penalty and four conversions in the third-placed play-off match against New Zealand to finish the tournament with 34 points.

==== 2014 Junior World Championship ====
Pollard was included in a South Africa Under-20 squad for the third time for the 2014 IRB Junior World Championship, and also named captain of the side. As first-choice fly-half and kicker, this tournament proved to be Pollard's most prolific. He kicked seven conversions in their 61–5 victory over Scotland in their opening match. Three penalties, two conversions and his first ever try in the Junior World Championships helped South Africa record a 33–24 victory over New Zealand in their second pool match and he kicked three conversions as South Africa clinched their third consecutive semi-final place with a 21–8 victory over Samoa.

They faced New Zealand again in the semi-final and Pollard helped South Africa secure their fourth consecutive victory over the Baby Blacks. He opened the scoring for South Africa with a 20th-minute try and also scored three conversions and two penalties in a 32–25 victory. He scored a further ten points in the final as South Africa lost 20–21 to England to finish runners-up in the competition.

Pollard was also briefly the leading points scorer in the history of the competition. During the semi-final matches, both Pollard (with 131 points) and Argentina's Patricio Fernández broke the record previously held by England's Tom Homer. However, the 26 points scored by Fernández in their 9th-place play-off match against Scotland meant that he became the new record holder with a total of 155 points, with Pollard in second place with 141 points.

Pollard's performances also earned him a nomination for the 2014 Young Player of the Year award, alongside Nathan Earle, Tevita Li and Garry Ringrose. At the conclusion of the tournament, Pollard was announced as the winner of the award.

=== Senior international rugby ===
At the conclusion of the 2014 IRB Junior World Championship, Pollard was called up to the senior Springbok squad for their final match of the 2014 incoming tours series against Scotland. With Springbok fly-halves Patrick Lambie and Johan Goosen both injured and Morné Steyn withdrawn from the squad by French club side Stade Français, Pollard was named as the starting fly-half for their match against Scotland. He subsequently made his international debut on 28 June 2014 in Port Elizabeth, contributing thirteen points (five conversions and a penalty) to help South Africa convincingly win the match 55–6.

A few weeks later, Pollard was included in a 30-man squad named by Springbok coach Heyneke Meyer for the 2014 Rugby Championship. He was named as the fly-half for the run-on side in their opening match of the competition against Argentina at Loftus Versfeld; within two minutes of making his Rugby Championship debut, he scored his first points in this competition by converting Ruan Pienaar's early try. He also scored a penalty a few minutes later to help the Springboks to a 13–6 victory. He was the starting fly-half in five of the Springboks' six matches during the competition – Morné Steyn starting their match against Australia in Perth – and was a key player in the Springboks' final match of the competition. In particular he scored two tries (his first at international level) and kicked a further nine points as the Springboks beat New Zealand 27–25 in Johannesburg, to help end New Zealand's 22-match unbeaten run dating back almost two years and their first ever defeat in The Rugby Championship competition since its expansion in 2012. He scored a total of 43 points in the competition, in joint second place with Australian Bernard Foley on the point scoring list and nine points behind tournament top scorer, Argentina's Nicolás Sánchez.

A knee ligament injury in February 2016 caused Pollard to miss most of 2016.

Pollard was named in South Africa's squad for the 2019 Rugby World Cup. South Africa went on to win the tournament for the third time, and Pollard was the tournament's leading points scorer. After missing a penalty attempt in the second minute of the final, Pollard thereafter converted six penalty kicks, missed an eighth attempt, but then converted two tries for a personal haul of 22 points. During the final, Pollard sustained a fractured eye socket, and although he played out the game, his subsequent hospitalization forced him to miss the first four days of the team's trophy tour, but was able to join for the final leg of the tour in Cape Town.

At the 2023 Rugby World Cup semi-final, on 21 October 2023, Pollard’s 77th-minute game-winning penalty kick saw South Africa squeeze past England 16-15 and through to the final against New Zealand. One week later, on 28 October, Pollard scored all of the points for South Africa in the Rugby World Cup final against the All Blacks, as he managed to successfully convert four penalty kicks which secured a 11–12 win for the Springboks.

Pollard is South Africa's second-highest all-time points scorer.

== Honours ==
South Africa

- Rugby World Cup: 2019 and 2023 winner
- British and Irish Lions 2021 series winner
- The Rugby Championship: 2019, 2024 and 2025 winner

== International statistics ==
=== Test Match record ===
As of 27 September 2026

Against	P	W	D	L	Tri	Con	Pen	DG	Pts	%Won
Argentina	12	9	0	3	2	20	22	0	116	75
Australia	11	5	0	6	0	12	17	0	75	45.45
British & Irish Lions	3	2	0	1	0	2	11	0	37	66.67
Canada	1	1	0	0	0	0	0	0	0	100
England	8	5	0	3	0	9	22	0	84	62.5
France	3	3	0	0	0	4	8	0	32	100
Georgia	2	2	0	0	1	8	0	0	21	100
Ireland	4	1	0	3	0	3	11	0	39	25
Italy	5	5	0	0	0	18	4	0	48	100
Japan	3	2	0	1	0	4	5	0	23	66.67
New Zealand	18	7	1	10	2	21	36	3	169	38.89
Samoa	1	1	0	0	0	1	4	0	14	100
Scotland	6	6	0	0	1	17	12	1	78	100
Tonga	1	1	0	0	0	4	0	0	8	100
United States	1	1	0	0	0	4	0	0	8	100
Wales	9	5	0	4	2	6	22	1	91	55.56
Total	88	56	1	31	8	132	175	5	844	63.64

P = Games Played, W = Games Won, D = Games Drawn, L = Games Lost, Tri = Tries Scored, Con = Conversions Scored, Pen = Penalties Scored, DG = Drop Goals Scored, Pts = Points Scored

=== International tries ===
As of 25 May 2025

Try	Opposing team	Location	Venue	Competition	Date	Result	Score
1	New Zealand	Johannesburg, South Africa	Ellis Park Stadium	2014 Rugby Championship	4 October 2014	Win	27–25
2	New Zealand	Johannesburg, South Africa	Ellis Park Stadium	2014 Rugby Championship	4 October 2014	Win	27–25
3	Wales	Cardiff, Wales	Millennium Stadium	2017 end-of-year tests	2 December 2017	Loss	24–22
4	Scotland	Edinburgh, Scotland	Murrayfield Stadium	2018 end-of-year tests	17 November 2018	Win	20–26
5	Argentina	Salta, Argentina	Estadio Padre Ernesto Martearena	2019 Rugby Championship	10 August 2019	Win	13–46
6	Argentina	Salta, Argentina	Estadio Padre Ernesto Martearena	2019 Rugby Championship	10 August 2019	Win	13–46
7	Wales	Cape Town, South Africa	Cape Town Stadium	2022 Wales tour of South Africa	16 July 2022	Win	30–14
8	Georgia	Nelspruit, South Africa	Mbombela Stadium	2025 mid-year tests	19 July 2025	Win	55–10

== Personal life ==
Handré is married to Marise, with whom he has two children, a son and a daughter.
