= Chris Schreuder =

South African rugby union player (born 1999)

- Full name: Christopher Schreuder
- Born: 24 January 1999 (age 27) South Africa
- Height

Rugby union career
- Position: Fly-half
Senior career
Years	Team	Apps	(Points)
2020–2022	Stormers	0	(0)
2020–2022	Western Province	3	(4)
- Correct as of 16 September 2022

Chris Schreuder (born 24 January 1999) is a South African rugby union player for the Western Province in the Currie Cup and Stormers. His regular position is fly-half.

Schreuder was named in the Western Province squad for the 2021 Currie Cup Premier Division. He made his debut in Round 7 of the Currie Cup for Western Province against the Pumas.
