= Ben Jones (rugby union, born 1998) =

- Born: Ben Jones; 8 October 1998 (age 28) Merthyr Tydfil, Wales
- Height: 175 cm (5 ft 9 in)
- Weight: 76 kg (12 st 0 lb)

Rugby union career
- Current team: Merthyr RFC
Senior career
Years	Team	Apps	(Points)
2017–2019	Cardiff Blues	1	(0)
2019–2020	Pontypridd RFC	37	(169)
2020–	Merthyr RFC		
- Correct as of 15 November 2022
International career
Years	Team	Apps	(Points)
2017–2018	Wales U20	15	(80)
- Correct as of 15 November 2022
National sevens team
Years	Team		Comps
2018	Wales		2

Ben Jones (born 8 October 1998) is a Welsh rugby union player who plays for Merthyr RFC as a fly-half. He is a Wales under-20 international.

Jones made his debut for the Cardiff Blues against Zebre on 4 November 2017. He previously played for the Blues academy.

In 2019, Jones joined Pontypridd RFC.

After a season with Pontypridd, Jones joined Merthyr RFC.
