= Abner van Reenen =

South African rugby union player

- Full name: Abner van Reenen
- Born: 30 July 1998 (age 28) Paarl, South Africa
- Height: 1.82 m (5 ft 11 1/2 in)
- Weight: 89 kg (196 lb)
- School: Garsfontein and Paarl Boys High School
- University: Paarl Boys High School

Rugby union career
- Position: Fly-half
- Current team: Cheetahs
Youth career
- 2017: Paarl Boys High School
Senior career
Years	Team	Apps	(Points)
2019–2021	Western Province	11	(107)
2020–2021	Stormers	3	(24)
2021–2023	Rovigo Delta	40	(269)
2023−	Cheetahs		
- Correct as of 8 September 2021

Abner van Reenen (born 30 July 1998) is a South African rugby union player for Cheetahs. His regular position is fly-half.

In 2020, Van Reenen was named in the Stormers squad for the Super Rugby Unlocked campaign. He made his debut for Stormers in Round 1 of the Pro14 Rainbow Cup SA against the Sharks. From 2021 to 2023, he played in Italy for the Rovigo Delta in the Top10.
