= Mannie Rass =

South African rugby union player

- Full name: Manuel Johern Rass
- Born: 19 April 1998 (age 28) Somerset West, South Africa
- Height: 1.75 m (5 ft 9 in)
- Weight: 88 kg (194 lb; 13 st 12 lb)
- School: Paarl Boys' High School
- University: University of the Witwatersrand

Rugby union career
- Position: Centre
- Current team: AZ-COM Maruwa MOMOTARO’S
Youth career
- 2011–2016: Western Province
- 2017–2019: Golden Lions
Senior career
Years	Team	Apps	(Points)
2017–2026	Golden Lions	33	(10)
2018	Golden Lions XV	1	(0)
2020–2026	Lions	47	(15)
2026–	AZ-COM Maruwa MOMOTARO’S		
- Correct as of 29 April 2026
International career
Years	Team	Apps	(Points)
2015–2016	South Africa Schools	5	(0)
2018	South Africa Under-20	4	(5)
- Correct as of 2 August 2019

Manuel "Mannie" Johern Rass (born 19 April 1998) is a South African rugby union player for the Lions in the United Rugby Championship and the Golden Lions in the Currie Cup. His regular position is centre.
