= PJ Botha =

South African rugby union player

- Full name: Pieter J. Botha
- Born: 20 January 1998 (age 28)
- Height: 1.82 m (5 ft 11 1/2 in)
- Weight: 100 kg (220 lb)
- School: Monument High School

Rugby union career
- Position: Hooker
- Current team: Lions / Golden Lions
Senior career
Years	Team	Apps	(Points)
2019	Golden Lions XV	4	(10)
2019–present	Golden Lions	21	(35)
2020–present	Lions	104	(70)
- Correct as of 26 October 2026
International career
Years	Team	Apps	(Points)
2016	South Africa Schools	3	(5)
- Correct as of 26 October 2026

Pieter J. Botha (born 20 January 1998) is a South African rugby union player for the Golden Lions in the Currie Cup and the Golden Lions XV in the Rugby Challenge. His regular position is hooker. He is the second son of former Springbok and Munster superstar BJ Botha.

== Club career ==
He made his Currie Cup debut for the Golden Lions in July 2019, coming on as a replacement in their second match of the 2019 season against Western Province.

On 25 April 2026 he made his 100th cap for the Lions in a 33-21 win over Connacht.
