= Ruben de Villiers =

South African rugby union player

- Full name: Ruben Christiaan de Villiers
- Born: 22 March 1997 (age 29) Pretoria, South Africa
- Height: 2.00 m (6 ft 6 1/2 in)
- Weight: 108 kg (238 lb; 17 st 0 lb)
- School: Paarl Boys' High School
- University: University of Groningen, The Netherlands

Rugby union career
- Position: Lock
- Current team: Western Province
Youth career
- 2013–2018: Western Province
Senior career
Years	Team	Apps	(Points)
2017–2018	Western Province	6	(5)
- Correct as of 26 August 2018
International career
Years	Team	Apps	(Points)
2015	South Africa Schools	3	(5)
2016	South Africa Under-20	5	(0)
- Correct as of 26 August 2018

Ruben Christiaan de Villiers (born 22 March 1997) is a South African rugby union player who last played for Western Province in the Rugby Challenge. His regular position is lock.
