= Sergeal Petersen =

South African rugby union footballer

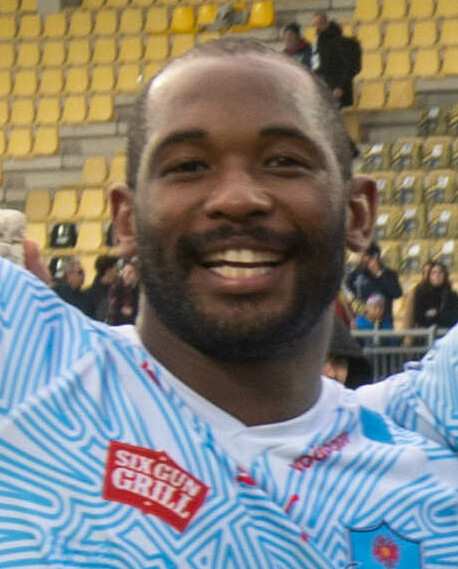
- Full name: Sergeal Phillipe Petersen
- Born: 1 August 1994 (age 32) Humansdorp, South Africa
- Height: 1.71 m (5 ft 7 1/2 in)
- Weight: 84 kg (185 lb; 13 st 3 lb)
- School: Grey High School

Rugby union career
- Position: Wing
- Current team: Bulls
Youth career
- 2007–2014: Eastern Province Kings
Senior career
Years	Team	Apps	(Points)
2013	Southern Kings	8	(20)
2013–2014	Eastern Province Kings	5	(5)
2015–2017	Cheetahs	35	(75)
2015	Free State XV	3	(15)
2015–2017	Free State Cheetahs	16	(65)
2018–2022	Western Province	37	(65)
2019–2022	Stormers	29	(30)
2022–2023	Shimizu Koto Blue Sharks	5	(5)
2025–	Bulls		
- Correct as of 16 September 2022
International career
Years	Team	Apps	(Points)
2012	South Africa Schools	3	(15)
2014	South Africa Under-20	5	(15)
2016	South Africa 'A'	1	(10)
2016	Springbok XV	1	(5)
- Correct as of 22 April 2018

Sergeal Phillipe Petersen (born 1 August 1994) is a South African rugby union player for the Stormers in Super Rugby and Western Province in the Currie Cup. His regular position is winger.

== Rugby ==
=== Youth rugby ===
Petersen played for the Eastern Province Kings at all youth levels, representing them at the 2007 Under-13 Craven Week, the 2010 Under-16 Grant Khomo Week (scoring three tries in three games) and in the 2012 Under-18 Craven Week (scoring four tries in three games). His performances in the latter tournament earned him inclusion in the South African Schools team that played against France, Wales and England in August 2012. Petersen scored a try in each of those matches to ensure that the South African remained unbeaten in the series.

Petersen was included in the squad for the 2013 IRB Junior World Championship, but failed to recover from a hamstring injury in time and was replaced by Jesse Kriel. He got a second opportunity the following year when he was included in the South Africa Under-20 side for the 2014 IRB Junior World Championship held in New Zealand. He opened his scoring in that competition just half an hour into the opening match against Scotland, helping his side to a 61–5 victory. He started their second match of the competition, where South Africa beat the hosts and four-time winners New Zealand 33–24, and scored a try in the final minute of their last match of the pool stages to secure a 21–8 victory over Samoa. Petersen contributed largely to South Africa once again beating New Zealand in the semi-final of the competition, this time winning 32–25 and he started his fifth consecutive match of the competition in the final against England; however, this time he finished on the losing side, with England winning the match 21–20 to be crowned champions for the second consecutive year.

=== Eastern Province Kings / Southern Kings ===
After finishing school at the end of 2012, Petersen signed a three-year contract with the Kings despite interest from several other teams. A few months later – and without any first class matches under his belt – he was named in the Southern Kings squad for the 2013 Super Rugby season. He made his first class debut in the Southern Kings' first ever Super Rugby game against the Force on 23 February 2013. He also scored the Kings' first ever try in Super Rugby...as well as their second during the second half, earning him a Man of the Match award. He started a total of eight matches for the Kings during the season, scoring further tries in their matches against the Chiefs and a consolation try in their 72–10 defeat to the Waratahs.

Petersen only made his debut for provincial side the Eastern Province Kings after eight Super Rugby appearances, coming on as a substitute in their 37–21 2013 Currie Cup First Division victory over the Griffons in Welkom. A further two appearances followed that season, as well as one for the Eastern Province U21 side during the 2013 Under-21 Provincial Championship. He also helped out the Eastern Province U19 side during their title run-in in the 2013 Under-19 Provincial Championship series. He scored two tries try for them in their 45–30 semi-final win over Boland U19, a further one in the final against the Falcons U19 in a 56–40 win and scored yet another one in their promotion play-off match against Border U19, winning 27–20 to help the team win promotion to Group A.

In 2014, Petersen made two appearances for the Eastern Province Kings during the 2014 Vodacom Cup competition and scored a try in their match against the Sharks XV. Upon his return from international duty at the 2014 IRB Junior World Championship, he was included in their squad for the 2014 Currie Cup Premier Division season. He was not involved in any matches for the first team at all, instead representing the Eastern Province U21 side in the 2014 Under-21 Provincial Championship. He scored seven tries in seven appearances as the side won the Under-21 competition for the third consecutive season and also scored two tries in their promotion play-off match against Border U21 to help them secure promotion to Group A for 2015.

=== Cheetahs ===
In July 2014, it was widely reported that Petersen signed a contract to play for the Cheetahs during the 2015 Super Rugby season, while still being available for the Eastern Province Kings during the 2015 Currie Cup Premier Division. However, Kings CEO Charl Crous said that, while they would assist their players in gaining Super Rugby experience, no deal was in place with the Cheetahs for a Petersen loan for 2015. It was then revealed that Petersen signed a three-year contract with the Free State Cheetahs for 2015–17 and he was included in the Cheetahs' wider training group prior to the 2015 Super Rugby season.

=== Sevens ===
In October 2013, Petersen was called into a South Africa Sevens training squad prior to the 2013 Dubai Sevens.

=== South Africa 'A' ===
In 2016, Petersen was included in a South Africa 'A' squad that played a two-match series against a touring England Saxons team. He didn't play in their first match in Bloemfontein, but started the second match of the series, scoring two tries in a 26–29 defeat in George.

== Athletics ==
Petersen also excelled in athletics, representing South Africa at the 2011 World Youth Championships in Athletics in the 100m and long jump events and at the 2011 Commonwealth Youth Games in 100m and 100m relay.
