= Lili Bester =

South African rugby union player

- Full name: Litelihle Bester
- Born: 1 April 2004 (age 22) East London
- Height: 1.87 m (6 ft 2 in)
- Weight: 92 kg (203 lb; 14 st 7 lb)
- School: Maritzburg College

Rugby union career
- Position(s): Outside Centre, Winger
- Current team: Sharks
Youth career
- 20??-2024: Sharks
Senior career
Years	Team	Apps	(Points)
2024-	Sharks	1	(0)
2024-	Sharks (Currie Cup)	3	(5)
- Correct as of 14 April 2025
International career
Years	Team	Apps	(Points)
2021	South Africa Schools		
2023-2024	South Africa under-20	10	(10)
- Correct as of 14 April 2025

Litelihle Bester (born 3 April 2003) is a South African rugby union player who plays for the Sharks in the United Rugby Championship and the Currie Cup.

== Career ==
He went to school at Maritzburg College where he was spotted and selected for South Africa Schools, joining them for their 2021 tour of Georgia. In 2022 he continued to represent South Africa Schools. He was selected for the South Africa under-19 assessment camp before being chosen for the 2023 and then later the 2024 World Rugby under-20 Championships.

He went on to join the Durban based, Sharks featuring for the Sharks (Currie Cup) side in the 2024 Currie Cup Premier Division, where the Sharks went on to win the tournament. He first Sharks appearance came when he started against Lyon in the 2024-25 EPCR Challenge Cup Round of 16, starting in the 34-21.

In December 2025, Bester signed an extension to keep him with the Sharks through 2028.

== Honours ==
=== Sharks ===
- Currie Cup Premier Division
  - Champions: (1) 2024
