= Jurich Claasens =

South African rugby union player

- Full name: Jurich Claasens
- Born: 9 July 2001 (age 25) South Africa
- Height: 1.67 m (5 ft 5 1/2 in)
- Weight: 70 kg (11 st 0 lb; 154 lb)
- School: Hoërskool Garsfontein

Rugby union career
- Position: Scrum-half
- Current team: Golden Lions
Senior career
Years	Team	Apps	(Points)
2022–	Golden Lions	9	(5)
- Correct as of 21 April 2023

Jurich Claasens (born 9 July 2001) is a South African rugby union player for the Golden Lions in the Currie Cup. His regular position is scrum-half.

Claasens was named in the Golden Lions side for the 2022 Currie Cup Premier Division. He made his Currie Cup debut for the Golden Lions against the Western Province in Round 1 of the 2022 Currie Cup Premier Division.
