= Kalvin Gourgues =

France international rugby union player (born 2005)

- Full name: Kalvin Gourgues
- Born: 27 March 2005 (age 21) Aucamville, France
- Height: 1.84 m (6 ft 0 in)
- Weight: 97 kg (214 lb; 15 st 4 lb)

Rugby union career
- Position(s): Centre, Fly-half, Fullback
- Current team: Toulouse
Youth career
- 2010–2019: Grenades Sport
- 2019–2023: Toulouse
Senior career
Years	Team	Apps	(Points)
2023–	Toulouse	14	(25)
- Correct as of 13 December 2025
International career
Years	Team	Apps	(Points)
2024–2025	France U20	5	(15)
2025–	France	2	(0)
- Correct as of 5 February 2026

Kalvin Gourgues (born 27 March 2005) is a French professional rugby union player who plays as a centre for Top 14 club Toulouse and the France national team.

== International career ==
In November 2025, he made his debut for France in the final round of the 2025 Autumn Nations Series. He came off the bench to assist a Louis Bielle-Biarrey try during a 48–33 victory against Australia.

== Honours ==
France

- 1x Six Nations Championship: 2026
