= Alex O'Driscoll =

English rugby union player

- Born: 4 April 2004 (age 22)
- Height: 188 cm (6 ft 2 in)
- Weight: 111 kg (17 st 7 lb)
- School: Berkhamsted School
- University: Loughborough University

Rugby union career
- Position: Prop
- Current team: Saracens
Youth career
- Amersham and Chiltern Rugby
- Wasps
Senior career
| Years | Team | Apps | (Points) |
| 2022– | Saracens | | |
International career
| Years | Team | Apps | (Points) |
| 2022 | England U18 | | |
| 2024 | Scotland U20 | | |
| 2026– | England A | 1 | (0) |

Alex O'Driscoll (born 4 April 2004) is a professional rugby union footballer who plays for Saracens. His preferred position is prop. Previously a Scotland U20 international, he made his debut for England A in November 2026.

== Club career ==
O'Driscoll was in the rugby academy at Wasps prior to joining Saracens, progressing to the Saracens Senior Academy ahead of the 2023-24 season. He only made one appearance for Saracens in the 2025-26 season, however had a run of games at the start of the 2026-27 season. O’Driscoll's performances included being a try scorer for Saracens in a 30-7 league win against Bristol Bears in October 2026.

== International career ==
An England U18 international in 2022, O'Driscoll represented Scotland at under-20 level, featuring in the 2024 U20 Six Nations Championship.

In November 2026, he was included in the England A squad to play against an Argentina XV in Bath, making his debut from the replacement bench.

== Personal life ==
O’Driscoll attended Loughborough University.
