= Ethan Bester =

South African rugby union player

- Born: 31 October 2004 (age 22) South Africa
- Height: 187 cm (6 ft 2 in)
- Weight: 112 kg (247 lb; 17 st 9 lb)
- School: Hilton College

Rugby union career
- Position: Hooker
- Current team: Sharks / Sharks
Senior career
Years	Team	Apps	(Points)
2024–	Sharks	1	(5)
2024–	Sharks	8	(0)
- Correct as of 5 May 2025
International career
Years	Team	Apps	(Points)
2024	South Africa U20	7	(0)
- Correct as of 5 May 2025

Ethan Bester (born 31 October 2004) is a South African rugby union player, who plays for the Sharks and Sharks. His preferred position is hookers.

== Early career ==
Bester attended Hilton College where he earned selection for SA Schools in 2022. In 2024 he was named in the South Africa U20 side for both the Rugby Championship and World Championship U20 tournaments.

== Professional career ==
Bester made his professional debut for the Sharks in the 2024 Currie Cup Premier Division. He made his Sharks debut in November 2024, and has gone on to make 8 appearances for the side and was named in a Springboks camp in February 2025.
