= Will Owen (rugby union) =

English rugby union player

- Born: 30 March 1995 (age 31) Ipswich, Suffolk, England
- Height: 1.85 m (6 ft 1 in)
- Weight: 100 kg (15 st 10 lb)

Rugby union career
- Position: Flanker
Senior career
Years	Team	Apps	(Points)
2013–17	Leicester Tigers	2	(0)
2015–16	Doncaster	7	(0)
- Correct as of 22 May 2017
International career
Years	Team	Apps	(Points)
2015	England Under 20s	12	(5)
- Correct as of July 2016

Will Owen (born 30 March 1995) is an English rugby union player.

== Club career ==
Owen plays flanker. He previously played for Nottingham R.F.C, and Leicester Tigers. On 28 January 2017 Owen made his Tigers debut as a substitute in an Anglo-Welsh Cup match against Northampton Saints, and was also an unused substitute against Harlequins in an Anglo-Welsh Cup game in January 2014. He has also played for Doncaster Knights on loan during the 2015-16 RFU Championship season, making 7 appearances for Doncaster during this spell.

== International career ==
Owen represented England Under 20s on 12 occasions and played in the 2015 World Rugby Under 20 Championship.
