= Charles Whitehead =

Charles Whitehead may refer to:

- Charles Whitehead (poet) (1804–1862), English poet, novelist and dramatist
- Charlie Whitehead (footballer) (1889–1972), Australian rules footballer
- Charlie Whitehead (singer) (1942–2015), American soul singer
