= Rory Taylor =

New Zealand rugby union player

- Born: 16 July 2002 (age 24) New Zealand
- Height: 189 cm (6 ft 2 in)
- Weight: 96 kg (212 lb; 15 st 2 lb)
- School: Rosmini College

Rugby union career
- Position: Wing
- Current team: Blues / North Harbour
Senior career
Years	Team	Apps	(Points)
2026–	North Harbour	11	(35)
2027–	Blues	0	(0)
- Correct as of 1 November 2026

Rory Taylor (born 16 July 2002) is a New Zealand rugby union player, who plays for the Blues. His preferred position is wing.

== Early career ==
Taylor is from New Zealand and attended Rosmini College, earning selection for the Blues U18 side in 2020. Following school he played his club rugby for Northcote, before representing North Shore. He worked as a property valuer before turning professional.

== Professional career ==
After his strong performances for North Shore at club level, Taylor was named in the North Harbour squad for the 2026 Hilux NPC. After scoring seven tries in his debut season, he signed for the Blues, being named in their squad for the 2027 Super Rugby Pacific season.
