= Gino Cupido =

South African rugby union player (born 2005)

- Born: 21 January 2005 (age 21)
- Height: 1.95 m (6 ft 5 in)
- Weight: 94 kg (207 lb)
- School: Hoërskool Strand

Rugby union career
- Position: Centre
- Current team: Stormers / Stormers XXIII
Senior career
Years	Team	Apps	(Points)
2025–	Stormers XXIII	1	
2026–	Stormers		
International career
Years	Team	Apps	(Points)
2025–2026	South Africa U20	1	(5)
National sevens team
Years	Team		Comps
2025–2026	South Africa		4

Gino Cupido (born 21 January 2005) is a South African professional rugby union player who plays for the Stormers in the United Rugby Championship and Stormers XXIII in the Currie Cup.

== Early life ==
He is from Sir Lowry's Pass Village and attended Strand High School.

== Career ==
In 2023, Cupido represented South Africa in sevens rugby at the 2023 Commonwealth Youth Games in Trinidad and Tobago, and for South Africa under-18s in their International Series in the Western Cape. He played for the South A Africa A-side at the Dubai International Invitational in December 2024.

has represented Western Province at junior and senior level, making his debut against Sharks in the Currie Cup in August 2024, and plays at centre in the 15-a-side game.

He made his debut for South Africa national rugby sevens team at the Hong Kong Sevens in the 2024–25 SVNS series. Upon his call-up South Africa coach Phillip Snyman said that he predicted he would go on "to achieve great things in rugby. He may only be 19 but is full of potential and a player I rate highly already". He made a try-scoring debut for South Africa at the tournament, scoring in his opening game against Uruguay, running in from 95 metres in a 40-7 victory for the Springboks.

Cupido featured as South Africa national under-20 rugby union team won the 2025 World Rugby U20 Championship in Italy, before continuing, after a brief injury hiatus, with South Africa Sevens in the 2025-26 SVNS. His performances included scoring a try in the final as South Africa won the 2026 Canada Sevens. He was also a try scorer in the final later that month at the 2026 USA Sevens in New York, and in May in the final of the 2026 Spain Sevens.

== Honours ==
South Africa U20

- World Rugby U20 Championship
  - (gold) Champion (1): 2025
