= Jon Echegaray =

French rugby union player (born 2005)

- Born: 9 June 2005 (age 21)
- Height: 184 cm (6 ft 0 in)
- Weight: 90 kg (198 lb)

Rugby union career
- Position: Full back
- Current team: Union Bordeaux Bègles
Senior career
Years	Team	Apps	(Points)
2025-	Union Bordeaux Bègles		
International career
Years	Team	Apps	(Points)
- France U20

Jon Echegaray (born 9 June 2005) is a French professional rugby union footballer who plays mainly as a full-back for Union Bordeaux Bègles.

== Club career ==
He played for Bidart before spending four years at Biarritz Olympique, prior to joining Union Bordeaux Bègles in 2023. He made his Top 14 debut for Bordeaux against Aviron Bayonnais in February 2025, at fullback, at the age of 19 years-old. After impressing on debut, he went on to score five times in his first five games that season, including the fastest try in the history of the Top 14 when he scored after ten seconds of their game against USA Perpignan. The following month, he was also a try-scorer in the European Rugby Champions Cup against Irish side Munster.

== International career ==
He played for France U20 in the 2025 U20 Six Nations Championship, scoring tries against Ireland and two against Scotland, as France won the title.
