= Markus Muller (rugby union) =

South African rugby union player (born 2007)

- Full name: Markus Muller
- Born: 12 July 2007 (age 19) Paarl, South Africa
- Height: 183 cm (6 ft 0 in)
- Weight: 93 kg (205 lb; 14 st 9 lb)
- School: Paarl Gimnasium (South Africa)

Rugby union career
- Position: Centre
- Current team: Stormers
Youth career
- 2024-2025: Western Province U18
Senior career
| Years | Team | Apps | (Points) |
| 2026– | Stormers | 1 | (0) |
- Correct as of 25 April 2026
International career
| Years | Team | Apps | (Points) |
| 2024-2025 | South Africa U18 | 5 | (20) |
| 2026- | South Africa U20 | 2 | (0) |
| 2026- | South Africa 'A | 1 | (5) |
- Correct as of 18 June 2026

Markus Muller (born 12 July 2007) is a South African professional rugby union player who plays as a centre for the Stormers and South African U20.

== Early life and education ==
Muller was educated at Paarl Gimnasium, one of South Africa's leading rugby schools. During his time there, he captained the school's first XV.

=== Youth career ===
Muller represented Western Province at youth level and gained national recognition during South Africa's elite school competitions.

In 2025, he captained the South African Schools U18 team, confirming his status as one of the top players in his age group. He has been described as a "freak of nature" within some school rugby circles, where his performances have been highly rated.

== Professional career ==
=== Stormers ===
Muller signed with the Stormers in 2025. After finishing school, he joined the senior squad and began training with the team in early 2026.

Muller made his first official URC debut on 25 April 2026 against the Glasgow Warriors during the 16th round of The United Rugby Championship and became the youngest Stormers player ever to debut for the franchise (18 years, 9 months, 19 days). The previous youngest debutant was Damian Willemse (18 years, 10 months, 4 days).

=== International career ===
==== South Africa U20 ====
Markus made his debut for the South African U20 side when the Junior Springboks took on Georgia earlier in February 2026. He was later on also included in the U20 side for the U20 Rugby Championship tour which was to take place in South Africa.

==== Springboks Squad ====
Muller was included in a Springbok alignment camp in 2026, highlighting his rapid progression towards professional rugby.

==== Springboks 'A ====
In June 2026, Muller was named in the South Africa 'A' starting side for their match against Zimbabwe in Gqeberha, starting in midfield alongside Springboks centre Lukhanyo Am. He scored a try in a 40-0 victory against Zimbabwe.
