= 2026 Under-20 International Series =

International rugby union competition

2026 U20 International Series
- Date: 21–30 May 2026
- Champions: South Africa (2nd title)
- Runners-up: Georgia
- Matches played: 6
- Tries scored: 74 (average 12.3 per match)
- Top point scorer: Vusi Moyo (57)
- Top try scorer: Luan Giliomee (5)

The 2026 U20 International Series is an international rugby union competition, part of the Under 20 International Series. The 2026 edition was held in South Africa at Rondebosch Boys' High School, Wynberg Boys' High School and Paul Roos Gymnasium from 21–30 May 2026. It featured under-20 national teams from South Africa, Chile, Georgia, and Fiji. The Junior Springboks were the winners of the event.

In 2021, The Baby Boks completed an unbeaten run in the 2021 U20 International Series, having been declared the unanimous winners of that years tournament.

== Competition rules and information ==
Each team played three matches in a round-robin format. There was no semifinals or finals.

== Teams ==

The teams that played in the 2026 U20 International Series were:

2026 U20 International Series teams
Team	Country
South Africa U20	South Africa
Fiji U20	Fiji
Chile U20	Chile
Georgia U20	Georgia

== Series standings ==
The log for the 2026 U20 International Series:

2026 U20 International Series standings
Pos	Team	P	W	D	L	PF	PA	PD
1	South Africa U20	3	3	0	0	236	39	+197
2	Georgia U20	3	2	0	1	102	106	-4
3	Fiji U20	3	1	0	2	95	142	-47
4	Chile U20	3	0	0	3	57	203	-146

* Stats correct as of 31 May 2026

== Fixture ==
The fixtures for the 2026 Under-20 International Series are:

=== Round 1 ===
21 May 2026
13:00 SAST (UTC+02)

Georgia	29–23	Fiji
Try: Arobelidze 13' m Zazadze 25' c, 57' c Ezieshvili 46' c Con: Dzodzuashvili (3/4) 25', 46', 57'; Pen: Dzodzuashvili (1/1) 69'; Cards: Akhvlediani (yellow card) 79'	Report	Try: Nauvasi 40' m Draiva 18' m, 27' m, 31' m Con: Bari (0/4); Pen: Bari (1/1) 43'; Cards: Naevo (yellow card)

Rondebosch Boys' High School, Cape Town
Referee: Juan de Bod (South Africa)

21 May 2026
15:00 SAST (UTC+02)

South Africa	97–00	Chile
Try: Brits 4' c Khosa 7' c, 22', 49' c Jansen 12' m, 27' c, 37' m Van der Berg 22' c, 35' c Kemp 41' c Van der Merwe 41' c Pratt 52' c Rabe 57' c, 65' m Potgieter 75' m, 82' c Con: Moyo (11/15) 4', 7', 23', 28', 36', 41', 42', 50', 53', 58', 83'	Report	Pen: Roa (0/1); Cards: Weitzel (yellow card) 58'

Rondebosch Boys' High School, Cape Town
Referee: Diogo Inácio (Portugal)

=== Round 2 ===
26 May 2026
13:00

Chile	26–59	Georgia
Try: Abumohor 44' c Silva 43' c Alvano 64' c Maino 74' m Con: Roa (1/1) 44'; Solar (2/2) 44', 65'; Cards: Roa (yellow card) 0'	Report	Try: Gharibashvili 2' c Zviadadza 9' m Narsia 11' m, 37' c Iaseshivili 25' c Kolbaia 34' c Natroshvili 39' c Agniashvili 79' c Devdariani 82' c Con: Makharadze (1/3) 3'; Tsiklauri (6/6) 26', 35', 37', 40', 79', 83'

Wynberg Boys' High School, Cape Town
Referee: Juan De Bod (South Africa)

26 May 2026
15:00

South Africa	82–25	Fiji
Try: Giliomee 1' c, 41' c, 45' m Potgieter 5' c Vorster 16' c Cannon 20' c Kemp 27' c, 33' c Hattingh 36' c Dlamini 54' c Olivier 58' c Orange 68' c Con: Moyo (11/12) 2', 6', 17', 21', 28', 34', 37', 42, 55', 59', 69'; Cards: Rabe (yellow card) 63'	Report	Try: Savenaca 8' m Penalty try 63'; Rokosuka 75' c Con: Bari (0/1); Lesimaimatuku (1/1) 76'; Pen: Bari (1/1) 30'; Cards: Bari (red card) 68'

Wynberg Boys' High School, Cape Town
Referee: Dylen November (South Africa)

=== Round 3 ===
30 May 2026
14:30

South Africa	57–14	Georgia
Try: Ahmed 7' c, 56' c Maake 18' m, 36' m Giliomee 24' c, 38' c Moya 29' c kemp 64' c Benade 70' c Con: Moya (4/6) 8', 25', 29', 39'; Ahmed (2/3) 65', 71'	Report	Try: Archvadze 13' c Luka Tabatadze 51' c Con: Makharadze (1/1) 13'; Khalvashi (1/1) 52'

Paul Roos Gymnasium, Stellenbosch
Referee: Diogo Inácio (Portugal)

30 May 2026
16:30

Fiji	47–31	Chile
Try: Nauvasi 8’ c Waqa 12’ c Naevo 22’ c Maurice 33’ c Koroiniwai 35’ c Taka 45’ c Draiva 53’ m Con: Lesimaikimatuku (6/7) 9’, 13’, 23’, 34’, 36’, 46’ Cards: Samo (yellow card) 29'; Qabale (yellow card) 63'	Report	Try: Silva 30’ c, 50’ m, 65’ m Alvano 60’ c Abumohor 80’ c Con: Bonilla (2/4) 31’, 60’ Solar (1/1) 81’

Paul Roos Gymnasium, Stellenbosch
Referee: Lulutho Matomela (South Africa)

== Statistics ==
The following players are the 2026 U20 Rugby Championship leaders:
* Stats correct as at 4 June 2026

=== Points scorers ===
Pos.	Name	Team	Pts.
1	Vusi Moyo	South Africa	57
2	Luan Gilomee	South Africa	25
3	Gert Kemp	South Africa	20
3	Rafael Silva	Chile	20
3	Judah Draiva	Fiji	20
6	Lindsey Jansen	South Africa	15
6	Risima Khosa	South Africa	15
6	Quintin Potgieter	South Africa	15
9	Yaqeen Ahmed	South Africa	14
9	Netani Lesimaimatuku	Fiji	14

=== Try scorers ===
Pos.	Name	Team	Tries
1	Luan Giliomee	South Africa	5
2	Gert Kemp	South Africa	4
2	Rafael Silva	Chile	4
2	Judah Draiva	Fiji	4
5	Risima Khosa	South Africa	3
5	Lindsey Jansen	South Africa	3
5	Quintin Potgieter	South Africa	3
8	Yaqeen Ahmed	South Africa	2
8	Luan van der Berg	South Africa	2
8	Altus Rabe	South Africa	2
8	Kebotile Maake	South Africa	2
8	Giorgi Zazadze	Georgia	2
8	Luka Narsia	Georgia	2
8	Max Abumohor	Chile	2
8	Marco Alvano	Chile	2
8	Maleli Nauvasi	Fiji	2
