= South Africa national under-20 rugby union team =

South Africa
- 2026 World Cup Winners
- Full name: Junior Springboks
- Union: SA Rugby
- Branch: SARU
- Nickname(s): Baby Boks; Junior Boks; Little Bokke; SA U20
- Founded: 2008
- Location: South Africa
- Chairman: Mark Alexander
- Director of Rugby: Rassie Erasmus
- Coach: Kevin Foote
- Captain(s): Riley Norton (2025-2026); Siphosethu Mnebelele (2026)
- Most appearances: Handre Pollard (14)
- Top scorer: Handre Pollard (141); Vusi Moyo (141) (as of 19 August 2026)
- Most tries: Wandisile Simelane (8)
- League(s): U20 World Rugby Championship, U20 The Rugby Championship, U20 International Series
- 2026 U20 RC 2026 U20 TRC 2026 U20 Series: Champions
Team kit	Change kit

First international
- South Africa 108–18 United States (6 June 2008)

Largest win
- South Africa 97–00 Chile (21 May 2026); South Africa 97–00 United States (5 June 2013); South Africa 104–7 Uruguay (27 June 2026)

Largest defeat
- South Africa 19–49 Argentina (25 June 2016)

World Cup
- Appearances: 16 (First in 2008)
- Best result: Champions (2012, 2025, 2026)

Union website
- www.sarugby.co.za
- Current season

The South Africa national under-20 rugby union team (nicknamed the Junior Boks or the Baby Boks) are South Africa's junior team at national level. They have been competing in the World Rugby Under 20 Championship (formerly the IRB Junior World Championship) since its inception in 2008. This Under-20 tournament replaced the previously-held Under-19 and Under-21 Rugby World Championships. Prior to 2018, it had been the country's "next senior" (second-level) 15-man national side, but World Rugby no longer allows member unions to designate age-grade sides as "next senior" teams. The Junior Boks also compete in the U20 Rugby Championship which first started in 2024. The Junior Boks are currently the holders of both the World Rugby U20 Championship and the U20 Rugby Championship. They were also named the unanimous winners of the 2026 Under-20 International Series which was hosted in South Africa in May 2026. The Junior Springboks beat France U20 to claim their back to back title in 2026.

On 21 May 2026, The Junior Springboks "ripped through their opponents’ defence", after defeating the Chile U20 side 97-00 at the 2026 U20 International series, tying their largest winning margin which was previously against the USA U20 side which they won 97-00 as well back in 2013.

== Combined Rankings ==
=== Head to Head ===
Below shows the South African Under-20's head-to-head record against other national teams in all U20 formats since inception.

South Africa U20 have played a total of 114 different U20 International matches since 2008. The Baby boks have played against 19 different nations, recording 85 wins, 3 draws and 26 defeats, giving them an overall win percentage of 75%.

*Stats correct as of 20 July 2026

Opposition	P	W	D	L	PF	PA	PD	% W
Argentina	17	12	0	5	559	399	+160	71%
Australia	7	4	0	3	285	147	+138	57%
Chile	1	1	0	0	97	0	+97	100%
England	18	8	0	10	438	457	-19	44%
Fiji	4	4	0	0	279	59	+220	100%
France	10	7	1	2	294	231	+63	70%
Georgia	10	10	0	0	412	118	+294	100%
Ireland	6	4	0	2	193	136	+57	67%
Italy	4	3	0	1	176	45	+131	75%
Japan	1	1	0	0	59	19	+40	100%
Kenya	2	2	0	0	117	43	+74	100%
Namibia XV	2	2	0	0	142	30	+112	100%
New Zealand	11	7	2	2	310	287	+23	64%
Samoa	3	3	0	0	77	27	+50	100%
Scotland	6	6	0	0	355	41	+314	100%
Tonga	1	1	0	0	40	14	+26	100%
United States	2	2	0	0	205	18	+187	100%
Uruguay	2	2	0	0	133	17	+116	100%
Wales	7	6	0	1	278	163	+115	86%
Total	114	85	3	26	4,453	2,259	+2,197	75%

=== Combined Records ===
The table below shows the combined statistics of the Junior Boks results by year:

*Stats correct as of 20 July 2026

South Africa U20 All Time Record
Year	P	W	D	L	PF	PA	PD	W%
2008	5	4	0	1	257	76	+181	80%
2009	5	4	0	1	197	85	+112	80%
2010	5	3	0	2	182	114	+68	60%
2011	5	4	0	1	256	84	+172	80%
2012	5	4	0	1	156	60	+196	80%
2013	6	5	0	1	309	122	+187	83%
2014	5	4	0	1	167	83	+84	80%
2015	7	6	0	1	234	122	+112	86%
2016	5	2	0	3	148	157	-9	40%
2017	5	3	1	1	192	90	+102	60%
2018	7	5	0	2	230	169	+61	71%
2019	10	7	0	3	348	210	+138	70%
2020	No results due to the COVID-19 pandemic							
2021	4	4	0	0	131	45	+86	100%
2022	4	4	0	0	152	100	+52	100%
2023	5	3	0	2	117	119	-2	60%
2024	8	3	1	4	214	185	+29	38%
2025	10	8	0	2	471	237	+234	80%
2026	13	12	1	0	697	198	+499	100%
Total	114	85	3	26	4,453	2,256	+2,197	75%

== World Rugby ==
=== Head to Head ===
The following table summarises South Africa Under-20's head-to-head record against other national teams in the World Rugby Under 20 Championship. The Junior Springboks have historically been one of the strongest sides in the competition, regularly advancing to the knockout stages and claiming the title on multiple occasions in 2012, 2025 & 2026.

South Africa have played 80 matches in the tournament against 16 different nations, recording 58 wins, 1 draw and 21 defeats, giving them an overall win percentage of 73%. Their strongest records are against Fiji, Georgia, Scotland, Samoa, Tonga, Japan, Uruguay and the United States, against whom they maintain unbeaten records. Their most frequently played opponent is England, while they also share a long-standing competitive rivalry with New Zealand at Under-20 level.

*Stats correct as of 18 July 2026

Opposition	P	W	D	L	PF	PA	PD	% W
Argentina	9	5	0	4	288	206	+82	56%
Australia	4	3	0	1	186	77	+109	75%
England	15	6	0	9	374	388	-14	40%
Fiji	3	3	0	0	197	34	+163	100%
France	9	6	1	2	252	204	+48	67%
Georgia	5	5	0	0	185	89	+96	100%
Ireland	5	3	0	2	160	112	+48	60%
Italy	4	3	0	1	176	45	+131	75%
Japan	1	1	0	0	59	19	+40	100%
New Zealand	8	7	0	1	223	197	+26	88%
Samoa	3	3	0	0	77	27	+50	100%
Scotland	6	6	0	0	355	41	+314	100%
Tonga	1	1	0	0	40	14	+26	100%
Uruguay	1	1	0	0	104	7	+97	100%
United States	2	2	0	0	205	18	+187	100%
Wales	4	3	0	1	159	100	+59	75%
Total	80	58	1	21	3,040	1,578	+1,462	73%

=== Record ===
South Africa Under-20 have participated in the World Rugby Under 20 Championship since 2008. The table below outlines their results by year:

*Stats correct as of 18 July 2026

South Africa – World Rugby U20 Championship record
Year	Host nation	P	W	D	L	PF	PA	PD	SF	F	Placing
2008	Wales	5	4	0	1	257	76	+181	L	-	3rd place
2009	Japan	5	4	0	1	197	85	+112	L	-	3rd place
2010	Argentina	5	3	0	2	182	114	+68	L	-	3rd place
2011	Argentina	5	4	0	1	256	84	+172	-	-	5th place
2012	South Africa	5	4	0	1	156	60	+96	W	W	1st place
2013	France	5	4	0	1	212	95	+117	L	-	3rd place
2014	New Zealand	5	4	0	1	167	83	+84	W	L	2nd place
2015	Italy	5	4	0	1	170	72	+98	L	-	3rd place
2016	England	5	2	0	3	148	157	-9	L	-	4th place
2017	Georgia	5	3	1	1	192	90	+102	L	-	3rd place
2018	France	5	3	0	2	163	152	+11	L	-	3rd place
2019	Argentina	5	4	0	1	164	92	+72	L	-	3rd place
2020	Cancelled due to the COVID-19 pandemic										
2021	Cancelled due to the COVID-19 pandemic										
2022	2022 U20 Summer Series										
2023	South Africa	5	3	0	2	117	119	-2	L	-	3rd place
2024	South Africa	5	2	0	3	152	120	+32	-	-	7th place
2025	Italy	5	5	0	0	249	92	+157	W	W	1st place
2026	Georgia	5	5	0	0	258	87	+171	W	W	1st place
Total		80	58	1	21	3,040	1,578	+1,462	—		

Champions
Runners-up
Third place
Home venue

=== Award winners ===
The following South Africa U20s players have been recognised at the World Rugby Awards since 2008:

World Rugby Junior Player of the Year
Year	Nominees	Winners
2012	Shaun Adendorff	Jan Serfontein
2012	Jan Serfontein	Jan Serfontein
2014	Handré Pollard	Handré Pollard
2016	Curwin Bosch	—
2017	Juarno Augustus	Juarno Augustus
2019	Jaden Hendrikse	—

=== Points Leaders ===
The table below highlights South Africa’s U20 top all-time points scorers in the World Rugby Under 20 Championship:

*Stats correct as of 19 August 2026

Most Points Scored
Rank	Name	Points
1	Handre Pollard	141
2	Francois Brummer	105
3	Curwin Bosch	104
4	Johan Goosen	79
5	Patrick Lambie	75
6	Vusi Moyo	63
7	Brandon Thomson	59
8	Sias Ebersohn	50
9	Yaqeen Ahmed	46
10	Manie Libbok	42
11	Seabelo Senatla	40
11	Wandisile Simelane	40
13	Jaden Hendrikse	38
14	Jean Smith	36
15	Juarno Augustus	35
15	Arno Botha	35
15	Jesse Kriel	35
15	Francois Venter	35
15	Wandile Mjekevu	35
20	Sanele Nohamba	33

=== Most Caps ===
The table below highlights South Africa’s U20 top all-time most capped players in the World Rugby Under 20 Championship:

*Stats correct as of 19 August 2026

Most Caps
Rank	Name	Caps
1	Handre Pollard	14
2	CJ Stander	10
2	Cheswill Jooste	10
2	Wandisile Simelane	10
2	Wandile Mjekevu	10
2	Gianni Lombard	10
2	Jurenzo Julius	10
2	Asenathi Ntlabakanye	10
2	Manie Libbok	10
2	Zachary Porthen	10
2	Batho Hlekani	10
2	Warrick Gelant	10
2	Carlü Sadie	10
2	Kene Okafor	
15	Francois Brummer	9
15	Curwin Bosch	9
15	Jesse Kriel	9
15	Francois Venter	9
15	Thomas du Toit	9
15	Jacobus Grobbelaar	9
21	Muller Uys	8
21	Zain Davids	8
21	Aidon Davids	8
21	Siya Kolisi	8
21	Paul Jordaan	8

=== Try Leaders ===
The table below highlights South Africa’s U20 top all-time tries scored in the World Rugby Under 20 Championship:

*Stats correct as of 19 August 2026

Most Tries
Rank	Name	Tries Scored
1	Wandisile Simelane	8
2	Juarno Augustus	7
2	Arno Botha	7
2	Jesse Kriel	7
2	Wandile Mjekevu	7
2	Seabelo Senatla	7
2	Francois Venter	7
8	Robert Ebersohn	6
8	Jurenzo Julius	6
8	Manie Libbok	6
8	Haashim Pead	6
12	Lionel Cronje	5
12	Lionel Mapoe	5
12	Tshotsho Mbovane	5
12	Siphosethu Mnebelele	5
12	Khuthadzo Rasivhaga	5

=== Baby Boks World Cup statistics by year ===
Statistic	2026	2025	2024	2023	2019
Tries	37	34	22	15	22
Penalty tries	1	0	1	0	0
Conversions	28	29	17	12	15
Penalty goals	5	7	2	6	7
Drop goals	0	0	0	0	1
Passes	695	470	613	507	465
Offloads	50	47	36	31	41
Clean breaks	21	28	13	12	15
Scrums	29	37	39	31	39
Scrum %	96%	93%	98%	95%	88%
Lineouts	75	53	65	50	51
Lineout %	90%	80%	80%	74%	72%
Tackles made	644	693	681	649	783
Breakdowns	471	352	508	407	442
Ball steals	7	6	3	2	1
Forced penalties	6	11	11	10	7
Yellow cards	2	4	2	4	6
Red cards	1	0	0	0	0
Penalties conceded	46	59	57	67	55
Free kicks conceded	7	4	4	2	5
General play kicks	83	105	112	126	n/a

*Stats correct as of 19 August 2026

== Rugby Championship ==
The U20 Rugby Championship is the southern hemisphere’s premier age-grade international tournament, contested annually by the junior national sides of South Africa, New Zealand, Australia, and Argentina. Functioning as the direct youth equivalent of the senior Rugby Championship, it mirrors the same four-nation format and competitive structure, with each team playing one another in a round-robin series to determine the champion.

Designed to replicate the intensity and standards of senior Test rugby, the competition is a key step in the development pathway for elite young players, often featuring athletes who progress directly into professional provincial rugby and ultimately senior international duty. For the Junior Springboks, it provides a crucial benchmark against the traditional southern hemisphere rivals and forms part of their preparation for the World Rugby U20 Championship.

=== Head to head ===
*Stats correct as of 11 May 2026

Opposition	P	W	D	L	PF	PA	PD	% W
Argentina	3	3	0	0	114	74	+40	100%
Australia	3	1	0	2	99	70	+29	33%
New Zealand	3	0	2	1	116	119	−3	17%
Total	9	4	2	3	300	261	95	56%

=== Record ===
The Junior Springboks have participated in the U20 Rugby Championship since 2024. The table below outlines their results by year:

*Stats correct as of 11 May 2026

South Africa – SANZAAR Rugby Championship Record
Year	Host nation	P	W	D	L	PF	PA	PD	Points	Placing
2024	Australia	3	1	1	1	62	65	-3	7	Second place
2025	South Africa	3	1	0	2	105	102	+3	6	Third place
2026	South Africa	3	2	1	0	133	67	+66	13	First Place
Total		9	4	2	3	300	234	66	—	

=== Baby Boks TRC team statistics by year ===
Since the U20 Rugby Championship (TRC U20) launched in 2024, the Junior Springboks have been competing in the southern hemisphere’s youth tournament. Competing against Argentina, Australia, and New Zealand, South Africa finally clinched their first title in 2026. They secured the championship on home soil at Nelson Mandela Bay Stadium following a 29–29 draw against New Zealand in the final round. This section tracks the Junior Boks' team statistics, from their initial runner-up finish in 2024 to their eventual breakthrough as tournament champions.

Statistic	2026	2025	2024
Points for	133	105	62
Points against	67	102	65
Tries	20	15	8
Penalty tries	2	1	0
Conversions	13	11	5
Penalty goals	1	2	4
Drop goals	0	0	0
Passes	390	344	243
Offloads	27	31	14
Clean breaks	14	13	4
Scrums	17	15	23
Scrum %	89%	100%	85%
Lineouts	43	28	29
Lineout %	88%	80%	67%
Tackles made	509	500	396
Breakdowns	239	262	238
Ball steals	3	2	3
Forced penalties	4	1	4
Yellow cards	1	0	3
Red cards	0	0	1
Penalties conceded	33	29	31
Free kicks conceded	2	1	2
General play kicks	51	67	69

*Stats correct as of 12 May 2026

=== Points Leaders ===
The table below highlights South Africa’s U20 top all-time points scorers at the SANZAAR Under 20 Rugby Championship:

*Stats correct as of 11 May 2026

Most Points Scored
Rank	Name	Points
1	Yaqeen Ahmed	35
2	Vusi Moyo	21
3	Jack Benade	20
4	Ethan Adams	15
5	Tyler Senior	13
6	Kyle Smith	11
T7	Litelihle Bester	10
T7	Demitre Erasmus	10
T7	Gino Cupido	10
T7	Haashim Pead	10
T7	Wandile Mlaba	10
T7	Hendre Schoeman	10
T7	Akahluwa Boqwana	10

=== Try Leaders ===
The table below highlights South Africa’s U20 top all-time tries scored in the SANZAAR Under 20 Rugby Championship:

*Stats correct as of 11 May 2026

Most Tries
Rank	Name	Tries Scored
1	Jack Benade	4
2	Ethan Adams	3
T3	Demitre Erasmus	2
T3	Gino Cupido	2
T3	Haashim Pead	2
T3	Litelihle Bester	2
T3	Wandile Mlaba	2
T3	Yaqeen Ahmed	2
T3	Hendre Shoeman	2
T3	Akahluwa Boqwana	2

== U20 International Series ==
The U20 International series was created for international rugby union matches and friendly tournaments played by men's national teams under the age of 20. Originally launched by World Rugby in 2021 to provide match play after global pandemic cancellations, the series serves as a high-performance development platform.

=== Head to head ===
*Stats correct as of 1 June 2026

Opposition	P	W	D	L	PF	PA	PD	% W
Argentina	3	2	0	1	93	69	+24	67%
Georgia	3	3	0	0	157	24	+133	100%
Uruguay	1	1	0	0	29	10	+19	100%
Chile	1	1	0	0	97	0	+97	100%
Fiji	1	1	0	0	82	25	+57	100%
Namibia	1	1	0	0	50	08	+42	100%
Total	10	9	0	1	508	136	+372	90%

=== Record ===
The Junior Springboks have participated in the U20 International Series since 2019. The table below outlines their results by year:

*Stats correct as of 15 June 2026

South Africa – U20 International Series
Year	Host nation	P	W	D	L	PF	PA	PD
2019	South Africa	3	2	0	1	141	52	+89
2021	South Africa	4	4	0	0	131	45	+86
2026	South Africa	3	3	0	0	236	39	+197
Total		10	9	0	1	508	136	+372

=== Points Leaders ===
The table below highlights South Africa’s U20 top all-time points scorers at the U20 International Series:

*Stats correct as of 15 June 2026

Most Points Scored
Rank	Name	Points
1	Vusi Moyo	57
2	David Coetzer	28
T3	Luan Giliomee	25
T3	Francke Horn	25
5	Gert Kemp	20
6	Jordan Hendrikse	18
T7	Marnus Potgieter	15
T7	Risima Khosa	15
T7	Quintin Potgieter	15
T7	Andre-Hugo Venter	15
T7	Henco van Wyk	15
T7	Canan Moodie	15

=== Try Leaders ===
The table below highlights South Africa’s U20 top all-time tries scored in the U20 International Series:

*Stats correct as of 15 June 2026

Most Tries
Rank	Name	Tries Scored
T1	Luan Giliomee	5
T1	Francke Horn	5
T3	Canan Moodie	3
T3	Gert Kemp	3
T3	Risima Khosa	3
T3	Lindsey Jansen	3
T3	Quintin Potgieter	3
T3	Andre-Hugo Venter	3
T3	Henco van Wyk	3
T3	Marnus Potgieter	3

== U20 Summer Series ==
The 2022 Under-20 Summer Series was an international rugby union tournament featured for under-20 men's national teams. Hosted by the Italian Rugby Federation, the tournament took place from 24 June to 12 July 2022, with matches played across Verona and Treviso.

The tournament was established as a one-off regional substitute for the World Rugby U20 Championship, which was suspended from 2020 to 2022 due to the COVID-19 pandemic. It featured eight competing nations divided into two pools of four. Participants included all six traditional Six Nations U20 unions (England, France, Ireland, Italy, Scotland, and Wales), alongside invited Southern Hemisphere teams (South Africa and Georgia).

South Africa finished the tournament as the only undefeated team after defeating Wales in the cross-pool final match.

=== Head to head ===
*Stats correct as of 15 June 2026

Opposition	P	W	D	L	PF	PA	PD	% W
England	1	1	0	0	30	22	+8	100%
France	1	1	0	0	42	27	+15	100%
Ireland	1	1	0	0	33	24	+9	100%
Wales	1	1	0	0	47	27	+20	100%
Total	4	4	0	0	155	100	+55	100%

=== Record ===
The Junior Springboks participated in a once off U20 Summer Series in 2022. The table below outlines their results:

*Stats correct as of 15 June 2026

South Africa – U20 Summer Series
Year	Host nation	P	W	D	L	PF	PA	PD
2022	Italy	4	4	0	0	155	100	+55
Total		4	4	0	0	155	100	+55

== All Results ==
=== International Series ===
==== 2026 ====
20 May 2026
15:00 SAST (UTC+02)

South Africa	97-00	Chile
Try: Brits 4' c Khosa 7' c, 22', 49' c Jansen 12' m, 27' c, 37' m Van der Berg 22' c, 35' c Kemp 41' c Van der Merwe 41' c Pratt 52' c Rabe 57' c, 65' m Potgieter 75' m, 82' c Con: Moyo (11/15) 4', 7', 23', 28', 36', 41', 42', 50', 53', 58', 83'	Report	Pen: Roa (0/1); Cards: Weitzel (yellow card) 58'

Rondebosch Boys' High School, Cape Town
Referee: Juan de Bod (South Africa)

26 May 2026
15:00

South Africa	82–25	Fiji
Try: Giliomee 1' c, 41' c, 45' m Potgieter 5' c Vorster 16' c Cannon 20' c Kemp 27' c, 33' c Hattingh 36' c Dlamini 54' c Olivier 58' c Orange 68' c Con: Moyo (11/12) 2', 6', 17', 21', 28', 34', 37', 42, 55', 59', 69'; Cards: Rabe (yellow card) 63'	Report	Try: Savenaca 8' m Penalty try 63'; Rokosuka 75' c Con: Bari (0/1); Lesimaimatuku (1/1) 76'; Pen: Bari (1/1) 30'; Cards: Bari (red card) 68'

Wynberg Boys' High School, Cape Town
Referee: Dylen November (South Africa)

30 May 2026
14:30

South Africa	57–14	Georgia
Try: Ahmed 7' c, 56' c Maake 18' m, 36' m Giliomee 24' c, 38' c Moya 29' c kemp 64' c Benade 70' c Con: Moya (4/6) 8', 25', 29', 39'; Ahmed (2/3) 65', 71'	Report	Try: Archvadze 13' c Luka Tabatadze 51' c Con: Makharadze (1/1) 13'; Khalvashi (1/1) 52'

Paul Roos Gymnasium, Stellenbosch
Referee: Diogo Inácio (Portugal)

==== 2021 ====
18 June 2021
15:00 SAST (UTC+02)

South Africa	29-10	Uruguay
Try: Moodie (2); Alexander; Hugo Venter; Gertse; Con: Wilkie (1); Meadon (1)	Report	Try: Evans; Con: Bameule (1); Pen: Bameule (1)

Markotter Stadium, Stellenbosch, South Africa
Referee: Phumzile Mbewu

23 June 2021
14:00 SAST (UTC+02)

South Africa	33-26	Argentina
Try: van Wyk; Moodie (2); Con: Hendrikse (3); Pen: Hendrikse (4)	Report	Try: Bernasconi; Vaca; Con: Waisberg (2); Pen: Waisberg (4)

Markotter Stadium, Stellenbosch, South Africa

28 June 2021
13:00 SAST (UTC+02)

South Africa	42-00	Georgia
Try: Blood van Wyk; Mkhize; Cronje (2); Steyn; Con: Meadon (6)	Report

Markotter Stadium, Stellenbosch, South Africa

03 July 2021
14:00 SAST (UTC+02)

South Africa	27-09	Argentina
Try: Hugo Venter (2); Alexander van Wyk; Con: Mngomezulu (2); Pen: Mngomezulu (1)	Report	Pen: Waisberg (3)

DHL Stadium, Cape Town

==== 2019 ====
9 April 2019

South Africa	58-10	Georgia
Try: Horne (4); Coetzer; Swanepoel; Dingaan; Mollentze; Con: Coetzer (6); Pen: Coetzer (2)	Report	Try: penalty try Pen: Abzhandadze (1)

Paarl Gimnasium, Paarl, South Africa

13 April 2019

South Africa	50-08	Namibia
Try: Richardson; Mollentze (2); Nohamba; Jobb (2); Gumede (2); Con: Coetzer (3) Mollentze (2)	Report	Try: Walters; Con: Loubscher (1)

Tygerberg, South Africa

17 April 2019

South Africa	33-34	Argentina
Try: Horn; Dingaan; Potgieter (3); Con: Coetzer (2); Chamberlain (2)	Report	Try: Dimcheff; Pelladini penalty try Pedemonte; Minervino; Con: Roger (1); Castro (1); Pen: Roger (1)

Paul Roos Gymnasium, Stellenbosch, South Africa

=== International Friendly ===
==== 2026 ====
29 January 2026
10:00 SAST

Maties	22-41	South Africa
Try: 9' m, 17' m, 19' m, 24' c Con: (1/4) 25'	Report	Try: Kemp 12'm Viljoen 30' c Vyambwera 39' c Maake 56' m Rasivhaga 57' m, 59' m van der Merwe 73' c Con: Ahmed (2/3) 31', 39'; Nela (1/4) 74'

Danie Craven Stadium, Stellenbosch

3 February 2026
08:00 SAST

UCT Ikey Tigers	27-95	South Africa
Try: 28' m, Penalty Try 29', 46' m, 48' m, 74' m Con: (0/4)	Report	Try: Schoeman 1' c, 8' c Siyaya 25' m Penalty Try 32'; Ahmed 33' c Steenkamp 39' c Jansen 43' c, 58' m, 61' c Fick 49' c Khosa 54' m, 72' c Vorster 56' m, 68' m Jordaan 64' c Con: Ahmed (4/5) 1', 9', 34', 39'; Erasmus (5/9) 44', 50', 61', 65', 73'

UCT Rugby Fields, Cape Town

22 February 2026
GST (UTC+04)

Georgia	00-35	South Africa
	Report	Try: Schoeman; Kruger; Van Wyk; Maake; Kemp; Con: Ahmed (5)

Avchala Stadium, Tbilisi, Georgia

27 February 2026
GST (UTC+04)

Georgia	05-35	South Africa
Try: Khalubi 42'	Report	Try: Jansen 8'; Schoeman 21'; Siyaya 24'; Ahmed 52'; Kosa 80'; Con: Ahmed 10', 22', 24', 81'; Cards: Ahmed (yellow card) 40'; Badenhorst (yellow card) 73'

Avchala Stadium, Tbilisi, Georgia

==== 2025 ====
14 June 2025

South Africa	75-19	Kenya
	Report

Stellenbosch, South Africa

9 June 2025

South Africa	42-24	Kenya
	Report

Stellenbosch, South Africa

==== 2019 ====
26 April 2019

England	35-08	South Africa
Try: Hodge; Adkins; Doherty; Kpoku; Moore-Aiono; Con: Hodge (5)	Report	Try: Ntlabakanye; Con: Hendrikse; Cards: Potgieter (yellow card)

Butts Park Arena, England

30 April 2019

Wales	31-35	South Africa
Try: Conbeer (2); Owen; Davies; Greggains; Con: Evans (3/5)	Report	Try: Horn penalty try Venter; Hendrikse; Nohamba; Con: Nohamba (4/4)

Cardiff, Wales

==== 2018 ====
8 May 2018

Wales	05-41	South Africa
	Report

Cardiff Arms Park, Wales

11 May 2018

England	12-26	South Africa
	Report

Sixways Stadium, Worcester, England

==== 2015 ====
12 May 2015

Argentina	22-25	South Africa
Try: Vélez 1' m Olmedo 23' c Boffelli 63' c Con: Miotti (1/2) 24'; Boffelli (1/1) 64'; Pen: Miotti (1/1) 36'	Report	Try: Jaer 38' c Hermanus 42' m du Preez 66' c Con: Stapelberg (2/3) 39', 67'; Pen: Stapelberg (2/2) 11', 57'

Santa Fe (Argentina))

16 May 2015

Argentina	28-39	South Africa
Try: Mallía 46' m Olmedo 59' c Resino 73' c Con: Boffelli (2/3) 60', 74'; Pen: Boffelli (3/3) 9', 14', 40'	Report	Try: Liebenberg 16'c van der Merwe 28' m, 34' c Zas 68' c Dweba 75' c Con: Thomson (4/5) 17', 25', 69', 76'; Pen: Thomson (2/2) 5', 9'

Rosario, Argentina

==== 2013 ====
11 May 2013

South Africa	92-27	Namibia
Try: Ungerer; Gedild (2); Janse van Rensburg (2); Steenkamp du Plessis; Davis; Senatla (2); Kolbe; Obi (2); Mahuza; Con: du Preez (11)	Report	Try: van Lill; Nel; Kitshoff; Con: Kotze (3); Pen: Kotze (2)

Paul Roos Gymnasium, South Africa

=== Rugby Championship ===
==== 2026 ====
Round 1

27 April
16:10 SAST (UTC+02)

South Africa (1BP)	48-21	Argentina
Try: Adams 5' m, 26' c Schoeman 9' c Ahmed 16' c Benade 19' m, 34' m, 55' m Reid 51' c Con: Yaqeen Ahmed (4/8) 10', 17', 26', 52'	Report	Try: Torre 62' c, 80' c Dande 74' c Con: Giannantonio (3/3) 63', 75', 80'

Nelson Mandela Bay Stadium
Referee: Gonzalo de Achaval (Argentina)

Round 2

3 May
16:10 SAST (UTC+02)

South Africa (1 BP)	56–17	Australia
Try: Benade 14' c Vyambwera 20' c Penalty Try 26', 34'; Adams 52' c Schoeman 58' c Cannon 67' c Ahmed 74' c Con: Ahmed (4/4) 15', 21', 53', 59'; Moyo (2/2) 68', 75'	Report	Try: Mackay 32' c Whitfield 36' m Taka 64' m Con: Mackay (1/3) 32'

Nelson Mandela Bay Stadium
Referee: Gonzalo de Achaval (Argentina)

Round 3

9 May
16:10 SAST (UTC+02)

South Africa	29–29	New Zealand
Try: Boqwana 10' m, 36' c Maake 29' c Badenhorst 42' c Con: Ahmed (3/4) 30', 37', 43'; Pen: Ahmed (1/1) 5'; Cards: Benade (yellow card) 77'		Try: Johnston 7' m Guerin 15' m Woodley 21' m McLeod 48' c Penalty Try 77'; Con: Muliaina (1/4) 49'; Cards: Pahulu (red card) 67'

Nelson Mandela Bay Stadium
Attendance: 18,138
Referee: Ella Goldsmith (Australia)

==== 2025 ====
Round 1

1 May
16:10 SAST (UTC+02)

South Africa	36–25	Argentina
Try: Pead (2) 15' c, 47' c Erasmus 23' m Norton 52' c Cupido 60' c Con: Smith (3/4) 16' 48' 52'; Moyo 61' (1/1); Pen: Smith (1/1) 5'	Report	Try: Senillosa 18' c Lescano 35' c Ledesma 41' m Con: Benedit (2/3) 19', 36'; Pen: Benedit (2/2) 11', 27'

Nelson Mandela Bay Stadium
Referee: Todd Petrie (New Zealand)

Round 2

6 May
16:10 SAST (UTC+02)

(1 BP) South Africa	24–29	Australia
Try: Nyali 2' c Ndlozi 27' c Hlekani 78' c Con: Moyo (2/2) 3', 28'; Smith (1/1) 78'; Pen: Moyo (1/1) 42'	Report	Try: Doyle 46' c Langi 59' c Ata 62' c Rubens 69' m Con: Harvey (3/4) 47', 60', 63'; Pen: Doyle (1/1) 75'; Cards: King (yellow card) 33' to 43'

Nelson Mandela Bay Stadium
Referee: Thomas Bertazza (Argentina)

Round 3

11 May
16:10 SAST (UTC+02)

(1 BP) South Africa	45–48	New Zealand
Try: Bester 2' m Ngobese 6' c Mnebelele 12' c Cupido 28' c Mlaba (2) 48' m, 55' c Penalty try 75'; Con: Moyo (4/6) 7', 13', 29', 56'	Report	Try: Saunoa (3) 17' m, 25' c, 40' c Letiu 32' m Kunawave (2) 42' c, 60' m Pole 45' c Solomon 51' m Con: Cole (4/8) 26', 41', 43', 47'; Cards: Woodley (red card); Baker (yellow card) 75'

Nelson Mandela Bay Stadium
Attendance: 14,835
Referee: Thomas Bertazza (Argentina)

==== 2024 ====
Round 1

2 May
17:00 AEST (UTC+10)

New Zealand	13–13	South Africa
Try: Solomon 53' m Vaenuku 78' m Con: Simpson (0/2); Pen: Hutchinson (1/2) 30'	Report	Try: Leotlela 58' c Con: Sefoor (1/1) 59'; Pen: Sefoor (2/3) 57', 63'; Cards: van Heerden (yellow card) 72'

Sunshine Coast Stadium
Referee: Jordan Kaminski (Australia)

Round 2

7 May
19:00 AEST (UTC+10)

Australia	24–19	South Africa (1 BP)
Try: Wilcox (2) 34' c, 65' c Penalty try 72'; Con: Wilcox (1/1) 35'; Fowler (1/1) 66'; Pen: Gray (1/2) 28'	Report	Try: van Heerden 31' c Bester (2) 62' c, 77' m Con: Williams (2/3) 32', 63'; Cards: Maqubela (red card) 19'; Hlekani (yellow card) 73'

Sunshine Coast Stadium
Referee: Angus Mabey (New Zealand)

Round 3

12 May
13:30 AEST (UTC+10)

South Africa	30–28	Argentina (1 BP)
Try: Julius 1' c Jacobs 47' c Badenhorst 58' m Porthen 70' m Con: van Niekerk (2/4) 2', 48'; Pen: van Niekerk (2/2) 68', 81'; Cards: Ezekiel Ngobeni (yellow card) 33' to 43'	Report	Try: Rossetto (4) 27' c, 35' c, 42' c, 74' c Con: Rodríguez (3/3) 28', 36', 43'; Di Lucca (1/1) 75'; Pen: Rodríguez (0/1); Di Lucca (0/1); Drop: Rodríguez (0/1); Cards: Gael Galván (yellow card) 67' to 77'

Sunshine Coast Stadium
Referee: Dan Waenga (New Zealand)

=== Summer Series ===
==== 2022 ====
Pool stage

24 June 2022
16:00

England	22-30	South Africa
Try: Stewart 8'; Ilione 57'; Oresanya 78'; Con: Smith 9', 51', Pen: Smith (51 p)	Report	Try: Hartzenberg 2', 54'; Steym 38'; Hanekom 45'; Lange 75'; Con: Mngomezulu 56'; Pen: Mngomezulu (60 p); Cards: Ningiza (yellow card) 7'

Payanini Center, Italy

29 June 2022
20:00

Ireland	24-33	South Africa
Try: O'Grady 48'; Michel 61'; Crothers 81'; Con: Prendergast 49', 62'; Malone 82'; Pen: Prendergast (21 p)	Report	Try: Hanekom 5'; Ludwig 25'; Lange 31'; Rahl 35'; Vokozela 56'; Con: Mngomezulu 7', 32', 36', 57'; Cards: Lange (yellow card) 38'

Payanini Center, Italy

5 July 2022
18:00

France	27-42	South Africa
Try: Bielle-Biarrey 18', 57'; Sa 38'; Jules Coulon 77'; Con: Barre 20'; Bielle-Biarrey 58'; Pen: Barre (41 p)	Report	Try: Hartzenberg 24'; Venter 28', 45'; Khan 60'; Vokozela 73'; Con: Mngomezulu 25', 29', 45', 62'; Pen: Mngomezulu 41', 53', 65'; Cards: Else (yellow card) 54'

Payanini Center, Italy

Final

12 July 2022
20:00

South Africa	47-27	Wales
Try: Nel 6'; Lange 11', 27', 50'; Hartzenberg 22', 56'; James 60'; Con: Mngomezulu 8', 13', 23'; Don 57', 61'; Pen: Koevort (50 p); Cards: Nel (yellow card) 37'	Report	Try: Grady 45'; Westwood 63'; Fackrell 73'; Jones 77'; Con: Hawkins 64', 78'; Pen: Hawkins (69 p); Cards: Evans (yellow card) 10'

Payanini Center, Italy

=== World Rugby ===
==== 2026 ====
South Africa went unbeaten to win the title back-to-back. They defeated Uruguay 104–7, Georgia 33–5, and Wales 52–33 to top the pool. They then beat England 53–37 in the semi-final before defeating France 16–5 in the final.

27 June 2026
20:30 GET (UTC+04)

(1 BP) South Africa	104–07	Uruguay
Try: Muller 7' c Steenkamp 11' c, 36' c, 70' c Penalty Tries 17'; Khosa 24' c, 58' c, 62' c Adams 27' c Rasivhaga 38' c, 43' c Jooste 42' c Brits 45' c, 77' c Mnebelele 53' c Kemp 74' c Con: Felix (2/2) 7', 12'; Giliomee (3/3) 39', 44', 43'; Boqwana (6/6) 55', 59', 63', 71', 76', 77'	Report	Try: Rivero 82' c Con: Pereira (1/1) 83'

Avchala Stadium, Tbilisi
Referee: Ruairidh Campbell (Scotland)

2 July 2026
20:30 GET (UTC+04)

(1 BP) South Africa	33–05	Georgia
Try: Mnebelele (2) 22' m, 33' c Jooste 53' c Giliomee 59' m Cannon 79' c Con: Giliomee (3/5) 34', 54', 61'; Felix (1/1) 80'	Report	Try: Tabatadze 8'; Cards: Ezieshvili (red card); Tsiklauri (yellow card) 59'

Avchala Stadium, Tbilisi
Referee: Morgan White (Hong Kong China)

7 July 2026
18:00 GET (UTC+04)

(1 BP) South Africa	52–33	Wales (1 BP)
Try: Schoeman 12' c Adams 17' c Mnebelele (2) 25' m, 67' c Theron 38' c Khosa 43' c Van Wyk (2) 53' m, 62' c Con: Ahmed (6/8) 13', 18', 38', 44', 62', 68'; Cards: Jooste (yellow card) 46'	Match details	Try: James 4' c Emanuel 10' c Lewis 49' c Bowen 55' m Edwards 79' c Con: Leggatt-Jones (3/4) 5', 11', 50'; Edwards (1/1) 79'; Cards: Pritchard (yellow card) 30'

Avchala Stadium, Tbilisi
Referee: Reuben Keane (Australia)

Semi-final

13 July 2026
20:30 GET (UTC+04)

South Africa	53–37	England
Try: Ahmed 12' c Rasivhaga (3) 34' m, 42' c, 53' c Maake (2) 48' c, 50' c Cannon 59' c Con: Ahmed (6/7) 13', 43', 48', 51', 54', 60'; Pen: Ahmed (2) 62', 69'; Cards: Giliomee (red card) 64'	Match details	Try: Streeter 4' c Shields (2) 30' c, 79' m Weimann 55' m Williams 65' c Con: Shields (3/5) 5', 31', 66'; Pen: Shields (2/2) 18', 40'; Cards: Kelly (red card) 32'

Avchala Stadium, Tbilisi
Referee: Kevin Bralley (France)

Final

18 July 2026
20:30 GET (UTC+04)

South Africa	16–05	France
Try: Muller 67' c Con: Ahmed (1/1) 68' c Pen: Ahmed (3/3) 9’, 40’, 79'	Report; Match details	Try: Audebert 45' m

Mikheil Meskhi Stadium, Tbilisi
Referee: Reuben Keane (Australia)

South Africa	France

FB	15	Alzeadon Felix
RW	14	Cheswill Joostee
OC	13	Markus Muller
IC	12	Ethan Adams	(substituted off) 56'
LW	11	Kuthadzo Rasivhaga
FH	10	Yaqeen Ahmed
SH	9	Hendre Schoeman	(substituted off) 56'
N8	8	Mumbere Vyambwera	(substituted off) 63'
BF	7	Luke Cannon	(substituted off) 21'
OF	6	Risima Khosa
RL	5	Johan Hattingh
LL	4	Heinrich Theron	(substituted off) 68'
TP	3	Daniel Kruger	(substituted off) 63'
HK	2	Siphosethu Mnebelele (c)	(substituted off) 48'
LP	1	Oliver Reid	(substituted off) 48'
Replacements:
HK	16	Liam Van Wyk	(substituted on) 48'
PR	17	Phiwayinkosi Rambo Kubheka	(substituted on) 48'
PR	18	Luan van der Berg	(substituted on) 63'
LK	19	Jaythen Orange	(substituted on) 68'
N8	20	Thomas Beling	(substituted on) 50', (substituted off) 58', (substituted on) 63'
OF	21	Gert Kemp	(substituted on) 21', (substituted off) 50', (substituted on) 58'
SH	22	Jayden Brits	(substituted on) 56'
IC	23	Samuel Badenhorst	(substituted on) 56'
Coach:
(South Africa) Kevin Foote

FB	15	Axel Guillaud	(substituted off) 54'
RW	14	Paul Cellio Zwiler
OC	13	Adrien Drault
IC	12	Bastien Rasal	(substituted off) 12', (substituted on) 25'
LW	11	Melvyn Rates
FH	10	Luka Keletaona	(substituted off) 49'
SH	9	Baptiste Tilloles	(substituted off) 873'
N8	8	Elyjah Ibsaiene	(substituted off) 56'
BF	7	Lucas Andjisseramatchi (c)
OF	6	Raphael Audebert	(substituted off) 52'
RL	5	Romeo Bonnard Martin
LL	4	Baptiste Veschambre
TP	3	Alexandre Langlois	(substituted off) 43', (substituted on) 71'
HK	2	Gabin Garault	(substituted off) 52'
LP	1	Matheo Frisach	(substituted off) 34'
Replacements:
HK	16	Elia Masi	(substituted on) 52'
PR	17	Edouard Jabea Njocke	(substituted on) 34'
PR	18	Mael Turpin	(substituted on) 43', (substituted off) 71'
LK	19	Leo Michaux	(substituted on) 52'
N8	20	Bobby Bissu	(substituted on) 56'
OF	21	Valentin Hutteau	(substituted on) 73'
SH	22	Diego Jurd	(substituted on) 12', (substituted off) 25', (substituted off) 49'
IC	23	Hugo Avogadro	(substituted on) 54'
Coach:
(France) Sébastien Calvet

Assistant referees:
George Selwood (England)
Gonzalo de Achaval (Uruguay)
Television match official:
Paulo Duarte (Portugal)

==== 2025 ====
South Africa went unbeaten to win the title. They defeated Australia 73–17, Scotland 73–14, and England 32–22 to top the pool. They then beat Argentina 48–24 in the semi-final before defeating New Zealand 23–15 in the final.

Pool stage

29 June 2025
15:30 CEST (UTC+02)

Australia	17–73	South Africa (1 BP)
Try: Harvey 13' m Watters (2) 70' m, 73' c Con: Harvey (1/3) 74'	Report	Try: Pead (2) 6' c, 45' c Lubbe 24' c Ndlozi (2) 31' c, 37' c Jooste 40' m Mentoe 47' c Theron 49' c Grobbelaar 53' m Nyali 58' c Williams 80' c Con: Moyo (7/9) 7', 25', 32', 38', 46', 48', 50'; Van der Merwe (2/2) 59', 80'

Stadio San Michele, Calvisano
Referee: Katsuki Furuse (Japan)

4 July 2025
18:00 CEST (UTC+02)

England	22–32	South Africa (1 BP)
Try: Weimann 7' c Treacey 11' c Bracken 32' m Con: Bellamy (1/1) 8'; Coen (1/2) 11'; Pen: Coen (1/1) 37'	Report	Try: Jooste 23' c Pead (2) 28' m, 50' c Mentoe 35' c Con: Moyo (2/3) 23', 36', 50'; Pen: Moyo (2/2) 46', 59'

Stadio Mario Battaglini, Rovigo
Referee: Tomas Bertazza (Argentina)

9 July
15:30 CEST (UTC+02)

(1 BP) South Africa	73–14	Scotland
Try: Williams (2) 4' c, 16' c Biyela 10' c Malgas 13' c Reid 21' c Mentoe 31' c Erasmus 35' m Everson (2) 61' c, 71' c Linde 64' c Pead 80' c Con: Moyo (4/5) 5', 13', 16', 22'; Van der Merwe (5/6) 32', 62', 65', 71', 80+1'	Report	Try: Stephen 29' c Finlayson-Russell 74' c Con: Urwin (1/1) 30'; Brown (1/1) 74'

Stadio San Michele, Calvisano
Referee: Ben Breakspear (Wales)

Semi-final

14 July 2025
20:30 CEST (UTC+02)

South Africa	48–24	Argentina
Try: Bester 9' c Pead 11' c Williams 17' c Theron 23' c Bester 60' c Jooste 80' c Con: Moyo (5/5) 10', 11', 18', 24', 61'; Malgas (1/1) 80'; Pen: Moyo (2/2) 55', 58'	Report	Try: Fiszman 39' c Silva 51' c Miranda 72' c Con: Benedit (2/2) 40', 52'; Senillosa (1/1) 73'; Pen: Benedit (1/1) 14'

Stadio Luigi Zaffanella, Viadana
Referee: Jérémy Rozier (France)

Final

19 July 2025
20:30 CEST (UTC+02)

New Zealand	15–23	South Africa
Try: Sa 16' m Kunawave 79' c Con: Cole (1/2) 79'; Pen: Simpson (1/1) 46'	Report	Try: Nyali 3' c Mentoe 77' c Con: Moyo (2/2) 4', 78'; Pen: Moyo (3/3) 22', 36', 57'

Stadio Mario Battaglini, Rovigo
Referee: Ben Breakspear (Wales)

New Zealand	South Africa

FB	15	Stanley Solomon
RW	14	Frank Vaenuku
OC	13	Cooper Roberts		(substituted off) 59'
IC	12	Jack Wiseman
LW	11	Maloni Kunawave
FH	10	Rico Simpson		(substituted off) 63'
SH	9	Dylan Pledger		(substituted off) 73'
N8	8	Mosese Bason		(substituted off) 26'	(substituted off) 59'
OF	7	Caleb Woodley
BF	6	Finn McLeod
RL	5	Jayden Sa		(substituted off) 55'
LL	4	Xavier Treacy	(yellow card) 71'
TP	3	Robson Faleafa		(substituted off) 63'
HK	2	Manumaua Letiu (c)		(substituted off) 60'
LP	1	Sika Uamaki Pole	Red card
Replacements:
HK	16	Eli Oudenryn		(substituted on) 60'
PR	17	Israel Time
PR	18	Dane Johnston		(substituted on) 63'
LK	19	Aisake Vakasiuola		(substituted on) 55'
N8	20	Micah Fale		(substituted on) 59'
SH	21	Jai Tamati		(substituted on) 73'
FH	22	Will Cole		(substituted on) 63'
OC	23	Tayne Harvey		(substituted on) 59'
Coach:
(New Zealand) Milton Haig

FB	15	Gilermo Mentoe
RW	14	Cheswill Joostee
OC	13	Demitre Erasmus		(substituted off) 80'
IC	12	Albertus Bester	(yellow card) 32'
LW	11	Jaco Williams
FH	10	Vusi Simphiwe Moyo
SH	9	Hassiem Pead		(substituted off) 80'
N8	8	Wandile Mlaba		(substituted off) 55'
BF	7	Bathobele Hlekani
OF	6	Xola Nyali		(substituted off) 26'
RL	5	JJ Theron		(substituted off) 23'	(substituted on) 33'	(substituted off) 55'
LL	4	Riley Norton (c)
TP	3	Herman Lubbe		(substituted off) 47'
HK	2	Siphosethu Mnebelele		(substituted off) 73'
LP	1	Simphiwe Ngobese		(substituted off) 55'
Replacements:
HK	16	Juandre Schoeman		(substituted on) 73'
PR	17	Oliver Reid		(substituted on) 55'
PR	18	JD Erasmus		(substituted on) 47'
LK	19	Jaco Grobbelaar		(substituted on) 23'	(substituted off) 33'	(substituted on) 55'
N8	20	Matt Romao		(substituted on) 55'
OF	21	Fano Linde		(substituted on) 26'
SH	22	Ceano Everson		(substituted on) 80'
IC	23	Dominic Malgas		(substituted on) 80'
Coach:
(South Africa) Kevin Foote

Player of the Tournament:
Hassiem Pead (South Africa)

Assistant referees:
Jérémy Rozier (France)
Katsuki Furuse (Japan)
Television match official:
Aled Griffiths (Wales)
Foul play Review Officer (FPRO):
Leo Colgan (Ireland)

==== 2024 ====
South Africa began with a 57–7 win over Fiji and finished in seventh place after the 7th-place play-off.

Pool stage

29 June
19:00 SAST (UTC+02)

South Africa	57–7	Fiji
Try: Julius (2) 10' c, 36' c Damon 13' c Leotlela 33' c Bakkes 44' c Mahashe 65' c Finca 69' m Moos 75' c Con: Koen (5/5) 10', 14', 34', 37', 45'; Sefoor (2/3) 66', 74'; Pen: Koen (1/1) 22'	Report	Try: Caginavanua 49' c Con: Kikau (1/1) 50'

DHL Stadium, Cape Town
Referee: Neheun Jauri Rivero (Argentina)

4 July
19:00 SAST (UTC+02)

South Africa	12–31	Argentina
Try: Penalty try 52'; Hlekani 81' m Con: Koen (0/1)	Report	Try: Greising Revol (2) 4' c, 22' m Bernasconi 8' m Elías 48' c Penoucos 70' c Con: Di Lucca (3/5) 5', 49', 70'

Danie Craven Stadium, Stellenbosch
Referee: Takehito Namekawa (Japan)

9 July
19:00 SAST (UTC+02)

South Africa	12–17	England
Try: Porthen 7' c Finca 51' m Con: Koen (1/2) 7'	Report	Try: Carnduff 27' c Bailey 45' m Isaacs 86' m Con: Kerr (1/1) 28'; Coen (0/2)

Athlone Stadium, Cape Town
Referee: Federico Vedovelli (Italy)

Fifth-place Semi-final

14 July
14:00 SAST (UTC+02)

Argentina	34–24	South Africa
Try: Greising Revol 20' c Elías 25' c Pérez Pardo 39' c Silva 66' c Con: Di Lucca (3/3) 21', 25', 40'; Elizalde (1/1) 67'; Pen: Di Lucca (1/1) 7'; Elizalde (1/1) 73'	Report	Try: Julius (2) 26' c, 77' c Mahashe 44' c Con: Sefoor (2/2) 27', 45' van Niekerk (1/1) 77'; Pen: Sefoor (1/1) 18'

Cape Town Stadium, Cape Town
Referee: Reuben Keane (Australia)

Seventh-place final

19 July
14:00 SAST (UTC+02)

South Africa	47–31	Wales
Try: Porthen 8' c Mahashe (2) 20' m, 46' c van Heerden 31' c Hlekani 56' c Moos 64' c Porthen 68' c Con: Sefoor (4/5) 11', 32', 47', 57'; Koen (2/2) 65', 69'	Report	Try: Price (2) 36' m, 73' c Boshoff 49' m S. Emanuel 62' c Conquer 83' c Con: Ford (0/2); Wilde (3/3) 63', 74', 84'

Cape Town Stadium, Cape Town
Referee: Reuben Keane (Australia)

==== 2023 ====
South Africa opened with a 29–14 win over Georgia and a 34–21 win against Ireland. They lost 19–24 to England in the semi-final before beating New Zealand 22–15 in the third-place play-off.

Pool stage

24 June
19:00 SAST (UTC+02)

South Africa	33–23	Georgia
Try: Letebele 6' c Julius 22' c Hooker 70' c Con: Smith (3/3) 7', 23', 72'; Pen: Smith (4/4) 3', 40', 66', 68'		Try: Tsikhistavi 13' c Tsirekidze 58' m Babunashvili 74' m Con: Khutsishvili (1/2) 14'; Kheladze (0/1); Pen: Khutsishvili (2/2) 45', 63'

Danie Craven Stadium, Stellenbosch
Referee: Ben Breakspear (Wales)

29 June
16:00 SAST (UTC+02)

South Africa	26–34	Italy
Try: Letebele 30' m Julius 36' c Markus 56' c Else 60' c Con: Khan (3/4) 38', 57', 61'; Pen: Khan (0/1)		Try: Penalty try 8'; Gasperini 17' c Gallorini (2) 45' c, 50' c Con: Brisighella (3/3) 18', 46', 51'; Pen: Brisighella (1/1) 24'; Sante (1/1) 74'

Paarl Gymnasium, Paarl
Referee: Reuben Keane (Australia)

4 July
19:00 SAST (UTC+02)

South Africa	24–16	Argentina
Try: Else 26' c Beets (2) 68' c, 75' c Con: Smith (3/3) 27', 69', 76'; Pen: Smith (1/1) 42'		Try: Zanella 35' c Con: Dicapua (1/1) 36'; Pen: Dicapua (3/3) 3', 14', 22'

Athlone Stadium, Athlone
Referee: Luc Ramos (France)

Semi-final

9 July
16:30 SAST (UTC+02)

Ireland	31–12	South Africa
Try: Nicholson (2) 37' c, 59' c Gleeson 49' c Berman 68' c Con: Prendergast (4/4) 38', 50', 61', 66'; Pen: Prendergast (1/1) 71'		Try: Khan 45' c Le Roux 75' m Con: Smith (1/2) 46'

Athlone Stadium, Athlone
Referee: Anthony Woodthorpe (England)

Third-place final

14 July
16:30 SAST (UTC+02)

South Africa	22–15	England
Try: Sieberhagen 10' c Beets 17' c Else 38' m Con: Smith (2/3) 11', 18'; Pen: Smith (1/1) 20'		Try: Wright 22' m Carr 42' c Con: Slevin (1/2) 43'; Pen: Slevin (1/2) 6'

Athlone Stadium, Athlone
Referee: Reuben Keane (Australia)

==== 2019 ====
South Africa opened with a 41–16 win over Fiji, then defeated Australia 36–19 and Italy 28–12. They lost 21–27 to England in the semi-final but won 31–18 against France in the third-place play-off.

Pool stage

4 June
10:30 AST (UTC–03)

South Africa	43–19	Scotland
Try: Horn 18' c Hendrikse (2) 37' c, 50' m Van der Mescht 68' c Nohamba 70' c Dube 80' c Con: Hendrikse (3/4) 19', 37', 68'; Nohamba (2/2) 71', 80'; Pen: Hendrikse (1/3) 10'	Report	Try: Walker 16' m Penalty try 40'; Anderson 63' c Con: Thompson (1/2) 64'

Racecourse Stadium, Rosario
Referee: Craig Evans (Wales)

8 June
10:30 AST (UTC–03)

South Africa	48–20	Georgia
Try: Richardson (2) 10' c, 63' c Ntlabakanye 36' c Mbatha 40' c Pretorius 48' m Abrahams 58' m Davids 77' m Coetzer 79' m Con: Hendrikse (3/3) 11', 37', 40'; Nohamba (1/3) 64'	Report	Try: Lashkhi (2) 26' m, 54' m Tchitchinadze 80' c Con: Abzhandadze (1/3) 80'; Pen: Abzhandadze (1/2) 43'

Racecourse Stadium, Rosario
Referee: Ben Blain (Scotland)

12 June
15:30 AST (UTC–03)

South Africa	25–17	New Zealand
Try: Isaacs 7' m Van der Mescht 18' m Con: Hendrikse (0/2); Pen: Hendrikse (3/3) 15', 38', 40'; Nohamba (2/2) 71', 78'	Report	Try: penalty try 44'; Lalomilo 74' c Con: Burke (1/1) 75'; Pen: Burke (1/1) 34

Racecourse Stadium, Rosario
Referee: Damon Murphy (Australia)

Semi-final

17 June
15:30 AST (UTC–03)

South Africa	7–20	France
Try: Mbatha 40' c Con: Hendrikse (1/1) 41'	Report	Try: Joseph 20' m Pen: Carbonel (5/5) 5', 8', 30', 60', 70'

Racecourse Stadium, Rosario

Third-place final

22 June
13:00 AST (UTC–03)

Argentina	16–41	South Africa
Try: De La Vega Mendia 41' c Carreras 45' m Con: De La Vega Mendia (1/1) 19'; Roger (1/1) 58'	Report	Try: Nohamba 3' c Abrahams (2) 29' c, 63' c Van der Mescht 72' c Pretorius 79' c Con: Nohamba (4/4) 4', 30', 64', 72'; Hendrikse (1/1) 79'; Pen: Nohamba (1/1) 27'; Drop: Coetzer 67'

Racecourse Stadium, Rosario

==== 2018 ====
South Africa began in France with a 33–27 win over Georgia and followed with a 29–14 win against Ireland. They lost 32–31 to England in the semi-final before finishing fourth after a 40–30 defeat to New Zealand.

Pool stage

30 May 2018
18:30

South Africa	33–27	Georgia
Try: Simelane 9' m Uys (2) 25' c, 55' c Green 42' c Burger 48' c Con: Willemse (4/5) 26', 43', 49', 56'	Report	Try: Lomidze 13' c Tapladze 38' c Dvalishvili 71' c Con: Aprasidze (3/3) 14', 39'; Abzhandadze (1/1) 72'; Pen: Aprasidze (2/2) 17', 52'

Stade Aimé Giral, Perpignan

3 June 2018
16:30

South Africa	30–17	Ireland
Try: Burger 1' c Du Plessis 19' m Simelane (3) 51' m, 57' m, 76' m Con: Willemse (1/2) 2'; Pen: Lombard (1/2) 68'		Try: Sweetman-Doris 34' c Silvester 43' c Con: Dean (2/2) 35', 44'; Pen: Dean (1/1) 22'

Parc des Sports Et de l'Amitié, Narbonne

7 June 2018
21:00

South Africa	29–46	France
Try: Erasmus 36' c Van der Merwe 46' m Simelane 63' m Tshakweni 69' m Sandi 74' c Con: Dobela (1/1) 37'; Lombard (1/4) 75'		Try: Joseph (2) 7' c, 19' c Carbonel 15' m Barassi 26' c Ntamack 33' c Gros 53' c Con: Carbonel (3/4) 8', 34', 54'; Ntamack (2/2) 20', 27'; Pen: Carbonel (2/3) 13', 79'

Parc des Sports Et de l'Amitié, Narbonne

Semi-final

12 June 2018
19:00

England	32–31	South Africa
Try: Parton 10' m Hardwick 15' c White 22' c Olowofela 60' c Con: Smith (3/4) 16', 23', 61'; Pen: Smith (2/2) 39', 48'		Try: Sandi 32' c Uys 44' m Nortjé 52' c Rass 67' m Ntlabakanye 74' c Con: Lombard (3/5) 33', 53', 75'

Parc des Sports Et de l'Amitié, Narbonne

Third-place final

17 June 2018
16:30

South Africa	40–30	New Zealand
Try: Green (2) 1' c, 43' c Sandi 16' c Nortjé 61' m Simelane 63' c Ntlabakanye 74' c Con: Lombard (5/6) 2', 17', 44', 64', 75'		Try: Renton 3' c Plummer 13' m Riedlinger-Kapa 28' c Clarke 80' m Con: Plummer (2/4) 4', 29'; Pen: Plummer (2/4) 8', 24'

Stade de la Méditerranée, Béziers

==== 2017 ====
South Africa opened their campaign in Georgia with a 28–17 win over France, followed by a 35–20 victory against Italy and a 31–22 win over Argentina to top their pool. They were narrowly beaten 22–24 by England in the semi-final before securing third place with a 37–15 win over New Zealand.

Pool stage

31 May 2017
15:30

South Africa	23–23	France
Try: Augustus (2) 1' c, 80' c Con: Bosch (2/2) 1', 80'; Pen: Bosch (3/3) 6', 46', 62'	Match details	Try: Buros 7' m Dufour 27' c Couilloud 41' m Con: Ntamack (1/3) 28'; Drop: Ntamack (2/2) 48', 54'

Avchala Stadium
Referee: (Australia) Nic Berry

4 June 2017
18:00

South Africa	38–14	Georgia
Try: Augustus 16' c Simelane (2) 34' c, 56' c Libbok (2) 36' m, 69' c Penxe 54' m Con: Cilliers (2/3) 17', 35'; Bosch (2/3) 58', 70'	Match details	Try: Tabidze 29' c Gogoladze 64' c Con: Aprasidze (2/2) 30', 65'

Avchala Stadium
Referee: (England) Tom Foley

8 June 2017
15:30

Argentina	14–72	South Africa
Try: Luna 14' c Malanos 29' c Con: Albornoz (2/2) 14', 30'	Match details	Try: Grobbelaar (2) 5' c, 9' m Lombard (2) 16' c, 51' m Willemse 35' m Penxe 38' c Augustus 42' c Papier 57' c Libbok 73' m De Villiers 74' c Cilliers 78' c Con: Bosch (7/11) 6', 17', 38', 43', 58', 75', 79'; Pen: Bosch (1/2) 47'

Avchala Stadium
Referee: (Ireland) Frank Murphy

Semi-final

13 June 2017
18:00

England	24–22	South Africa
Try: Mercer (2) 2' c, 75' c Mitchell 15' c Con: Malins (3/3) 3', 16', 76'; Pen: Malins (1/2) 20'	Match details	Try: Augustus (2) 9' c, 40' m Van Heerden 55' c Con: Bosch (2/3) 10', 56'; Pen: Bosch (1/1) 72'

Mikheil Meskhi Stadium
Referee: (Ireland) Frank Murphy

Third-place final

18 June 2017
15:30

South Africa	37–15	France
Try: Van Heerden 15' c Grobbelaar (2) 41' c, 65' m Brits 52' c Augustus 71' m Con: Libbok (3/5) 15', 42', 53'; Pen: Libbok (2/2) 48', 60'	Match details	Try: Mauvaka 27' m Couilloud 77' c Con: Couilloud (1/2) 77'; Pen: Couilloud (1/1) 34'

Mikheil Meskhi Stadium
Referee: (England) Tom Foley

==== 2016 ====
South Africa came from behind to beat Japan 59–19 in their opening match in Pool C of the 2016 World Rugby Under 20 Championship held in Manchester. They were beaten 13–19 by Argentina in their second match, suffering only their fourth defeat ever in the pool stage of the competition, but bounced back to secure a 40-31 bonus-point victory over France in their final pool match to secure a semi-final place as the best runner-up in the competition. They faced hosts and three-time champions England in the semi-finals, who proved too strong for the visitors, knocking them out of the competition with a 39–17 victory. South Africa's final match came against Argentina, who already beat them previously in Pool C, in the third-place play-off final. Argentina won again, with a very convincing 49–19 scoreline, condemning South Africa to fourth place in the competition.

Pool stage

7 June 2016
15:15

South Africa	59–19	Japan
Try: Davids (2) 9' c, 44' c Jackson 36' c Ward (2) 41' c, 48' c Libbok 63' c Mafuma 70' c Sadie 80' c Con: Bosch (8/8) 10', 37', 42', 45', 49', 64', 71', 80'; Pen: Bosch (1/1) 55'	Match details	Try: Moeakiola (3) 19' c, 25' c, 30' m Con: Kanai (2/3) 21', 25'

Academy Stadium, Manchester
Referee: (Italy) Elia Rizzo

11 June 2016
18:00

South Africa	13–19	Argentina
Try: Van den Berg 63' c Con: Bosch (1/1) 64'; Pen: Bosch (2/5) 3', 29'	Match details	Try: Malanos 40' c Con: Miotti (1/1) 40'; Pen: Miotti (4/5) 10', 35', 47', 59'

AJ Bell Stadium, Salford
Referee: (Wales) Craig Evans

15 June 2016
19:45

South Africa	40–31	France
Try: Papier 15' c Davids 33' m Van der Merwe 44' c Libbok 61' m Bosch 65' c Con: Bosch (3/5) 15', 45', 65'; Pen: Bosch (3/3) 7', 11', 67'	Match details	Try: Tanguy 4' c Simutoga 25' c Buros 28' c Ngandebe 79' c Con: Belleau (4/4) 5', 27', 29', 79'; Pen: Belleau (1/1) 19'

Academy Stadium, Manchester
Referee: (England) Craig Maxwell-Keys

Semi-final

20 June 2016
19:45

England	39–17	South Africa
Try: Green 2' c Taylor 6' m Aspland-Robinson 20' c Williams 34' c Malins 40' m Wright 72' m Con: Mallinder (3/6) 3', 21', 34'; Pen: Mallinder (1/1) 54'	Match details	Try: Van der Merwe 48' c Bosch 51' c Con: Bosch (2/2) 49', 52'; Pen: Bosch (1/1) 12'

Academy Stadium, Manchester
Referee: (New Zealand) Paul Williams

Third-place final

25 June 2016
16:45

Argentina	49–19	South Africa
Try: Mallia (2) 14' c, 80' c Castiglioni 25' c Romanini 42' c Baldunciel 61' c Dominguez 67' c Con: Miotti (6/6) 15', 26', 43', 63', 68', 81'; Pen: Miotti (3/3) 34', 46', 51'	Match details	Try: Libbok 5' c Van der Merwe 9' m Campher 21' c Con: Bosch (2/3) 6', 22'

AJ Bell Stadium
Referee: (Ireland) Andrew Brace

==== 2015 ====
For 2015, the IRB Junior World Championship was rebranded as the World Rugby Under 20 Championship. South Africa started the competition with a 33–5 win against hosts Italy and recorded a 40–8 win against Samoa and a 46–13 win over Australia in their remaining pool matches to finish top of Pool B to qualify for the semi-finals with the best record pool stage of all the teams in the competition. They came up against an England side that beat them in the 2014 final and were eliminated by the same opponents again, losing 20–28 to be eliminated from the competition. They restored some pride by winning their third-place play-off match against France 31–18 to win the bronze medal.

Pool stage

2 June 2015
20:30

South Africa	33–5	Italy
Try: Van der Merwe 15' c Penalty try 34' c Liebenberg 37' c Bothma 65' m Van Wyk 78' c Con: Thomson (3/3) 16', 35', 38'; De Beer (1/2) 79'	Stats	Try: Agbasse 11' m

Stadio San Michele, Calvisano
Referee: Gary Conway (Ireland)

6 June 2015
18:30

South Africa	40–8	Samoa
Try: Du Toit 7' c Jenkins 35' m Liebenberg 46' m Zas 49' c Penalty try 80' c Con: Thomson (2/4) 8', 50'; De Beer (1/1) 80'; Pen: Thomson (3/3) 4', 22', 40'	Stats	Try: Leilua 66' m Pen: Falaniko (1/1) 29'

Stadio Sergio Lanfranchi, Parma
Referee: Elia Rizzo (Italy)

10 June 2015
20:30

South Africa	46–13	Australia
Try: Vermeulen 2' c Nché 17' c Ngcukana 43' c Thomson 54' c Jenkins 59' m Zas 68' c Con: Thomson (4/4) 4', 18', 44', 56'; De Beer (1/1) 69'; Pen: Thomson (2/2) 12', 36'	Stats	Try: Paia'aua 62' m Kellaway 78' m Pen: Deegan (1/1) 8'

Stadio San Michele, Calvisano
Referee: Ben Whitehouse (Wales)

Semi-final

15 June 2015
20:30

South Africa	20–28	England
Try: Jaer 77' c Du Plessis 79' c Con: Thomson (2/2) 77', 79'; Pen: Thomson (2/3) 7', 20'	Stats	Try: Chisholm 25' m Penalty try 39' c Tompkins 70' c Con: Jennings (2/3) 40', 71'; Pen: Jennings (3/5) 4', 10', 54'

Stadio San Michele, Calvisano
Referee: Brendon Pickerill (New Zealand)

Third-place final

20 June 2015
18:30

France	18–31	South Africa
Try: Bonneval 11' m Delannoy 42' m Blanc 48' m Pen: Meret (1/1) 8'	Stats	Try: Du Toit 21' c Jenkins 28' c Du Preez (2) 33' c, 38' c Con: Thomson (4/4) 22', 29', 35', 39'; Pen: Thomson (1/3) 66'

Stadio Giovanni Zini, Cremona
Referee: Matthew Carley (England)

==== 2014 ====
In the 2014 IRB Junior World Championship held in New Zealand, South Africa beat Scotland 61–5, hosts New Zealand 33–24 and Samoa 21–8 to finish top of their pool. They again met New Zealand in the semi-finals and beat them again, this time by a 32–25 scoreline, to qualify to their second final. However, they lost the final 20–21 to England to finish the competition in second spot.

Pool stage

2 June 2014
15:35

South Africa	61–5	Scotland
Try: Schoeman 17' c Petersen 28' c Greeff (2) 45' c, 79' c Kriel (2) 49' c, 74' c Marx 56' c Gelant 58' c Davis 65' m Con: Pollard (7/8) 17', 29', 46', 50', 57', 59', 74'; Du Plessis 80'; Pen: Pollard (0/1)	Report	Try: Farndale 9' m Con: Chalmers (0/1)

QBE Stadium, Auckland
Referee: (Uruguay) Joaquín Montes

6 June 2014
19:35

New Zealand	24–33	South Africa
Try: Li (3) 13' c, 24' c, 78' c Con: Hickey (2/2) 14', 25'; Mo'unga (1/1) 78'; Pen: Hickey (1/1) 36'; Cards: James Tucker (yellow card) 71' to 80'	Report	Try: Kriel 32' m Pollard 47' c Greeff 57' m Gelant 71' c Con: Pollard (2/4) 47', 72'; Pen: Pollard (3/3) 7', 11', 31'; Drop: Pollard (0/1)

QBE Stadium, Auckland
Referee: (France) Alexandre Ruiz

10 June 2014
17:35

Samoa	8–21	South Africa
Try: Apa 31' m Con: Talataina Mu (0/1); Pen: Talataina Mu (1/4) 40'; Cards: Richard Mariota (yellow card) 34' to 44'; Nathaniel Apa (yellow card) 48' to 58'	Report	Try: Davis 37' c Esterhuizen 63' c Petersen 79' c Con: Pollard (3/3) 38', 64', 79'; Pen: Pollard (0/2)

ECOLight Stadium, Pukekohe
Referee: (New Zealand) Ben O'Keeffe

Semi-final

15 June 2014
19:35

South Africa	32–25	New Zealand
Try: Pollard 15' c Petersen 51' c Esterhuizen 70' m Els 78' c Con: Pollard (3/4) 16', 52', 79'; Pen: Pollard (2/3) 40', 57'; Drop: Pollard (0/1); Cards: André Esterhuizen (yellow card) 29' to 39'	Report	Try: Faiva 4' m Li 32' c Aso 66' c Con: Mo'unga (0/1); McKenzie (2/2) 33', 67'; Pen: McKenzie (2/2) 30', 42'

QBE Stadium, Auckland
Referee: (Argentina) Federico Anselmi

Final

20 June 2014
19:35

England	21–20	South Africa
Try: Earle 39' m Conlon 52' c Con: Burns (1/2) 53'; Pen: Burns (2/3) 17', 44'; Morris (1/1) 37'	Report	Try: Kriel (2) 20' c, 64' c Con: Pollard (2/2) 21', 65'; Pen: Pollard (2/2) 14', 46'; Drop: Pollard (0/1)

Eden Park, Auckland
Referee: (New Zealand) Ben O'Keefe

==== 2013 ====
South Africa won all three their pool matches at the 2013 IRB Junior World Championship held in France; they beat the United States 97–0, England 31–24 and hosts France 26–19 to top their pool to qualify to the semi-finals. They lost their semi-final match 17–18 to Wales before winning their fourth third-place play-off match in six seasons, beating New Zealand 41–34.

Pool stage

5 June 2013
20:45

South Africa	97–0	United States
Try: Beerwinkel 5'; Kolbe 13'; Senatla (4) 14', 28', 31', 42'; Steenkamp 19'; Geduld (2) 22', 26'; Du Toit 36'; Kriel (2) 44', 67'; Willemse (2) 50', 57'; Obi (2) 52', 60'; Con: Pollard (1/6) 19'; Du Preez (6/10); Pen: Pollard (1/1) 3'	Report

Stade Henri Desgranges, La Roche-sur-Yon
Referee: Shuhei Kubo (Japan)

9 June 2013
16:45

South Africa	31–24	England
Try: Senatla (2) 1' c, 31' m Du Plessis 42' c Con: Du Preez (2/3) 2', 42'; Pen: Du Preez (4/6) 6', 10', 16', 56'	Report	Try: Sloan 36' c Stooke 41' c Purdy 59' c Con: Slade (3/3) 36', 41', 60'; Pen: Slade (1/3) 48'

Stade Henri Desgranges, La Roche-sur-Yon
Referee: Mike Fraser (New Zealand)

13 June 2013
20:45

France	19–26	South Africa
Try: Regard 8' c Tauleigne 49' m Serin 64' c Con: Selponi (1/2) 9'; Serin (1/1) 64'	Report	Try: Swanepoel 1' m Obi 42' c Kolbe 78' m Con: Pollard (1/3) 42'; Pen: Pollard (3/3) 14', 44', 70'

Stade Henri Desgranges, La Roche-sur-Yon
Referee: Marius Mitrea (Italy)

Semi-final

18 June 2013
18:15

South Africa	17–18	Wales
Try: Herbst 36' c Smith 59' c Con: Pollard (2/2) 37', 60'; Pen: Pollard (1/4) 75'	Report	Try: Jenkins 56' m Evans 79' c Con: Davies (1/2) 80'; Pen: Davies (2/3) 20', 30'

Stade de la Rabine, Vannes
Referee: Luke Pearce (England)

Third-place final

23 June 2013
15:15

South Africa	41–34	New Zealand
Try: Obi 34' c De Bruin 37' c Senatla 40' c Steenkamp 52' m Smith 56' c Ungerer 71' m Con: Pollard (4/6) 35', 38', 40', 56'; Pen: Pollard (1/2) 61'	Report	Try: Visinia (2) 8' c, 14' c Edwards 21' c Webber 40' m Manihera 77' m Con: Hickey (3/4) 9', 15', 22'; Pen: Hickey (1/1) 46'

Stade de la Rabine, Vannes
Referee: Dudley Phillips (Ireland)

==== 2012 ====
South Africa hosted the tournament in 2012, but the hosts got off to a bad start, losing 19–23 to Ireland in their first match. However, they recovered to beat Italy 52–3 and previously-unbeaten England 28–15 to finish top of the log. They easily dispatched Argentina in the semi-final, winning 35–3, before beating New Zealand 22–16 in the final in Cape Town, winning the competition for the first time and ending the latter's four-year reign as champions.

Pool stage

4 June 2012
18:45

South Africa	19–23	Ireland
Try: P. Willemse 53' c Con: T. Jantjies (1/1) 54'; Pen: T. Jantjies (4/4) 10', 60', 64', 71'	Report	Try: J. Coghlan 27' c C. Gilsenan 66' c Con: JJ Hanrahan (2/2) 28', 67'; Pen: JJ Hanrahan (2/2) 21', 24'; Drop: JJ Hanrahan (1/1) 57'

Danie Craven Stadium, Stellenbosch
Referee: Leighton Hodges (Wales)

8 June 2012
18:45

South Africa	52–3	Italy
Try: W. Small-Smith 15' m P. Willemse 20' c J. Serfontein (2) 27' c, 58' c S. Kitshoff 38' m V. van der Watt 52' c B. Steyn 62' c P. Howard 80+1' c Con: H. Pollard (5/6) 21', 28', 53', 59', 63'; T. Jantjies (1/2) 80+2'	Report	Pen: J. Apperley (1/2) 30'

University of the Western Cape Stadium, Bellville
Referee: Mathieu Raynal (France)

12 June 2012
18:45

South Africa	28–15	England
Try: W. Small-Smith 42' c S. Adendorff (2) 47' c, 68' c P.-S. du Toit 60' c Con: H. Pollard (4/4) 43', 48', 61', 69'	Report	Pen: T. Bell (5/5) 32', 45', 57', 68', 74'

Cape Town Stadium, Green Point
Referee: Glen Jackson (New Zealand)

Semi-final

17 June 2012
19:15

Argentina	3–35	South Africa
Pen: S. Poet (1/3) 45'	Report	Try: J. Serfontein 21' c M. Pretorius 36' m R. Rhule (2) 40' c, 52' c Con: H. Pollard (3/4) 22', 40', 53'; Pen: H. Pollard (2/3) 7', 62'; T. Jantjies (1/3) 66'

Newlands Stadium, Newlands
Referee: Glen Jackson (New Zealand)

Final

22 June 2012
18:45

New Zealand	16–22	South Africa
Try: M. Keresoma 34' c Con: I. West (1/1) 35'; Pen: I. West (2/3) 13', 56'	Report	Try: V. van der Watt 47' m J. Serfontein 61' m Pen: H. Pollard (4/5) 10', 19', 39', 75'; Drop: H. Pollard (1/1) 60'

Newlands Stadium, Newlands
Attendance: 33,210
Referee: Greg Garner (England)

==== 2011 ====
Victories in South Africa's first two matches at the 2011 IRB Junior World Championship held in Italy – beating Scotland 33–0 and Ireland 42–26 – were followed by a defeat at the hands of England, losing 20–26 to finish second in the pool and failing to qualify for the semi-finals for the first time. Instead, they went into the fifth-placed play-off series, where a 57–15 win over pool rivals Ireland and a 104–17 win over Fiji saw them finish the competition in fifth spot.

Pool stage

10 June 2011
20:10

South Africa	33 – 0	Scotland
Try: Venter 14', 43'; Botha 34', 58'; Con: Goosen (2/3) 35', 44'; Beyers (0/1); Pen: Goosen (3/4) 6', 10', 18'	Report

Stadio Plebiscito, Padua
Referee: Mathieu Raynal (France)

14 June 2011
20:10

Ireland	26 – 42	South Africa
Try: Conway 40+1' c, 75' c Con: McKinney (2/2) 40+2', 76'; Pen: McKinney (4/5) 3', 16', 22', 31'	Report	Try: Venter 4' c, 28' c Etzebeth 38' c Mjekevu 68' m Botha 80+3' c Con: Goosen (4/5) 5', 29', 39', 80+4'; Pen: Goosen (2/4) 9', 18'; Drop: Goosen (1/1) 56'

Stadio Comunale di Monigo, Treviso
Referee: Jonathan White (New Zealand)

18 June 2011
20:10

England	26 – 20	South Africa
Try: Daly 7' m Gray 43' m Wade 70' c Con: Ford (0/2); Cook (1/1) 70'; Pen: Ford (3/4) 2', 29', 62'	Report	Try: Carr 25' m Con: Mjekevu (0/1); Pen: Goosen (5/5) 37', 40+1', 49', 65', 78'

Stadio Plebiscito, Padua
Attendance: 7,000
Referee: John Lacey (Ireland)

Fifth-place semi-final

22 June 2011
20:10

South Africa	57 – 15	Ireland
Try: Du Preez 2' c Mjekevu 8' c, 25' c Botha 13' m Mbovane 28' m, 54' c, 73' c Taute 42' c Venter 70' m Con: Goosen (5/7) 2', 8', 26', 43', 54'; Welthagen (1/2) 73'	Report	Try: McKeon 60' m Jackson 77' c Con: McKinney (1/2) 77'; Pen: McKinney (1/1) 22'

Stadio Plebiscito, Padua
Attendance: 1,300
Referee: Francisco Pastrana (Argentina)

Fifth-place final

26 June 2011
14:10

Fiji	17 – 104	South Africa
Try: Radradra 28'; Lalagavesi 33'; Con: Lalagavesi (2/2) 29', 34'; Pen: Lalagavesi (1/2) 19'; Radradra (0/1)	Report	Try: Mbovane 2', 74'; Mjekevu 5'; Carr 9'; Botha 13' 24', 81'; Venter 16'; Rademan 36', 42'; Taute 55', 79'; Penalty try 58'; Skosan 66'; Jordaan 70'; Kleinhans 72'; Con: Goosen (12/16) 3', 14', 17', 37', 56', 58', 67', 71', 73', 74', 80', 81'

Stadio Comunale di Monigo, Treviso
Referee: Francisco Pastrana (Argentina)

==== 2010 ====
A 40–14 victory over Tonga in the opening match of Pool C in the 2010 IRB Junior World Championship held in Argentina was followed up by a 73–0 victory over Scotland, before South Africa suffered their first ever pool stage defeat in the competition, losing 35–42 to Australia. Although finishing in second position in the pool, they still qualified for the semi-finals by virtue of having the best record of the second-placed teams across the three pools. They were eliminated 7–36 by New Zealand in the semi-finals, but managed to win the third-place play-off for the third year in a row, avenging their previous semi-final exists at the hands of England by beating them 27–22.

Pool stage

5 June
2:00pm

Tonga	14–40	South Africa
Try: Moala 76' m Pen: Toloke (3/3) 7', 57', 68'; Cards: Latu (yellow card) 48'	Report	Try: Mastriet 22' c Stander (c) 40+1' c Venter 53' c Lambie 80+3' c Con: Lambie (4/4) 23', 40+1', 54', 80+4'; Pen: Lambie (4/4) 1', 9', 18', 30'

C.A. Estudiantes, Paraná
Referee: Peter Allan (Scotland)

9 June
2:00pm

South Africa	73–0	Scotland
Try: Mjekevu 2' c Kolisi (2) 9' c, 12' c Van der Merwe 21' c Badenhorst 28' m Jantjies 37' c Lambie 46' c Sithole (2) 50' c, 57' c Jantjies 64' c Okafor 72' m Con: Lambie (8/9) 3', 10', 13', 22', 38', 47', 51', 58'; Jantjies (1/1) 65'	Report

Estadio Brigadier General Estanislao López, Santa Fe
Referee: Francisco Pastrana (Argentina)

13 June
4:10pm

South Africa	35–42	Australia
Try: Mjekevu (2) 8', 54' c Lambie 23' m Van der Merwe 40' c Taute 67' m Con: Lambie (2/3) 40+1', 55'; Pen: Lambie (2/2) 1', 42'	Report	Try: Shipperley (3) 12' c, 33' c, 49' c Coleman 26' c Quirk 64' m Con: To'omua (4/4) 13', 27', 34', 50'; Pen: To'omua (3/3) 15', 60', 76'

Estadio Brigadier General Estanislao López, Santa Fe
Referee: Garratt Williamson (New Zealand)

Semi-final

17 June
4:30pm

New Zealand	36–7	South Africa
Try: Savea (2) 5', 70'; Thomson 23' c Grice 29' c Con: Bleyendaal (2/2) 24', 30'; Pen: Bleyendaal (4/4) 18', 51', 57', 59'	Report	Try: Du Preez 40+2' c Con: Lambie (1/1) 40+3'

Estadio Marcelo Bielsa, Rosario
Referee: John Lacey (Ireland)

Third-place final

21 June
4:45pm

England	22–27	South Africa
Try: Watson 13' c Burns 23' c Marler 33' m Con: Burns (2/2) 14', 23'; Pen: Clegg (1/1) 68'; Cards: Green (yellow card) 16'	Report	Try: Scheepers 8' c Sithole (2) 25', 57' c Lambie 41' m Con: Lambie (2/2) 9', 57'; Pen: Lambie (1/1) 73'; Cards: Van der Walt (yellow card) 16'

Estadio Marcelo Bielsa, Rosario
Referee: Francisco Pastrana (Argentina)

==== 2009 ====
South Africa were placed in Pool C of the 2009 competition held in Japan. They emulated their 2008 form, winning all three of their pool matches – they beat Fiji 36–10, Italy 65–3 and France 43–27 to finish top of the pool. They again lost to England in the semi-finals (losing 21–40), but again bounced back by winning the third-place play-off match, this time beating Australia 32–5.

Pool stage

5 June 2009
7:00pm

South Africa	36 - 10	Fiji
Tries: Stander 24' m R. Ebersohn 49' c S. Ebersohn 55' c Mastriet 69' m Con: S. Ebersohn (2/4); Pen: Brummer (0/2); S. Ebersohn (3/4) 12', 39', 44'; Drop: S. Ebersohn 28'		Tries: Nakaitaci 15' c Con: Nakaitaci (1/1); Pen: Nakaitaci (1/3) 26'

Kintetsu Hanazono Rugby Stadium, Osaka
Referee: (New Zealand) Keith Brown

9 June 2009
3:00pm

Italy	3 - 65	South Africa
Pen: Benvenuti (0/2); Mortali (1/1) 68'		Tries: Van den Heever (2) 25' c, 31' m Seabela (2) 35' m, 68' c L. Cronjé (2) 43' c, 50' m S. Ebersohn 47' m R. Ebersohn 56' c Chikukwa 65' c Sadie 80' c Con: S. Ebersohn (4/8); L. Cronjé (2/2); Pen: S. Ebersohn (1/1) 4'

Kintetsu Hanazono Rugby Stadium, Osaka
Referee: (Scotland) Peter Allan

13 June 2009
5:00pm

France	27 - 43	South Africa
Tries: Lapandry 3' c Doumayrou 20' c Penalty 77' c Con: Bernard (3/3); Pen: Bernard (2/3) 1', 31'		Tries: Mastriet (2) 40' m, 73' c Marais 41' c R. Cronjé 57' c L. Cronjé 69' m Con: Brummer (3/5); Pen: S. Ebersohn (0/2); Brummer (3/4) 35', 38', 45'; Drop: S. Ebersohn 7'

Kintetsu Hanazono Rugby Stadium, Osaka
Referee: (Wales) James Jones

Semi-final

June 17th, 2009
7:00pm

South Africa	21 - 40	England
Tries: Stander 15' m Hanekom 54' c Con: Brummer (1/2); Pen: Brummer (3) 13', 40', 59'; Elstadt (red card) 64'		Tries: Youngs 41' c Gaskell 60' c Lawes 70' c Trinder 79' c Con: Homer (4/4); Pen: Homer (4) 3', 7', 10', 65'

Chichibunomiya Rugby Stadium, Tokyo
Referee: (New Zealand) Chris Pollock

Third-place final

June 21st, 2009
1:00pm

Australia	5 - 32	South Africa
Tries: Anae 14' m White (yellow card) 28'		Tries: Cronjé 4' m, 79' c Van den Heever 8' c Hanekom 52' c Con: Brummer (3/4); Pen: Brummer (2) 1', 20'; Schoeman (yellow card) 56; Stander (yellow card) 66

Chichibunomiya Rugby Stadium, Tokyo
Referee: (New Zealand) Keith Brown

==== 2008 ====
South Africa took part in the inaugural edition of the competition in 2008 held in Wales, where they were drawn in Pool B. They beat the United States 108–18 in their very first game. A 72–3 victory over Scotland and a 16–11 win against Samoa saw them top the pool to qualify for the semi-final stages. They lost their semi-final match 18–26 to England, but returned to winning ways with a 43–18 win over hosts Wales in the third-place play-off match.

Pool stage

6 June 2008

South Africa
Try: Watermeyer (3) 4' c, 49' c, 76' c

Marole 7' c
Janse van Vuuren (3) 15' c, 28' c, 54' c
Ebersohn 21' c
Van Velze (2) 44' c, 45' c
Mapoe 47' c
Nhlapo 58' c
Willis 60' c
Brummer (2) 69' c, 71' c
Ebersohn 82' c
Con: Ebersohn (10/10) 5', 8', 16', 22', 29', 45', 46', 48', 50', 55'

Brummer (4/4) 61', 70', 77', 83'
Cards: Nhlapo (yellow card) 38'
108–18

United States
Try: Pittman 32' c
Johnston 41' m
Con: Treacy (1/2) 33'
Pen: Treacy (2/2) 12', 38'

Racecourse Ground, Wrexham
Referee: Taizo Hirabayashi

10 June 2008

South Africa
Try: Van Deventer (2) 17' c, 83' c

Mapoe (2) 23' c, 43' c
Dippenaar 27' c
Muller 44' c
Pietersen (2) 48' c, 67' c
Janse van Vuuren 80' m

Seabela 85' m
Con: Brummer (8/10) 18', 24', 28', 45', 49', 81', 84', 86'
Pen: Brummer (1/1) 12'
Drop: Brummer 6'
72–3

Scotland
Pen: Murray (1/1) 25'
Cards: Stafford (yellow card) 83'

Racecourse Ground, Wrexham
Referee: Chris Pollock

14 June 2008

South Africa	16–11	Samoa
Try: Marole 25' c Watermeyer 78' m Pen: Brummer (2/2) 18', 41'; Cards: Ebersohn (yellow card) 83'		Try: Masoe 10' m Pen: Sefo (2/2) 6', 21'; Cards: Tuilagi (yellow card) 75'; Aiono (yellow card) 12'

Racecourse Ground, Wrexham
Referee: James Bolabiu

Semi-final

14 June 2008

South Africa	18–26	England
Try: Van Velze 21' m Afrika 24' c Goode 6' m Con: Brummer (1/3) 25'; Pen: Brummer (2/2) 16', 76'		Try: Simpson 5' m Cato 38' c Corbisiero 82' c Con: Goode (3/3) 20', 43', 69'; Cards: Kirsten (yellow card) 65'

Arms Park, Cardiff
Referee: Peter Fitzgibbon

Third-place final

22 June 2008

South Africa	43–18	Wales
Try: Brummer 13' m Ebersohn 19' c Mapoe (2) 35' c, 71' m Koster 43' c Kirsten 68' m Ebersohn 82' c Con: Brummer (4/6) 20', 35', 43', 83'; Cards: Pietersen (yellow card) 56', Hess (yellow card) 76'		Try: Halfpenny 55' m Hobbs 59' c Con: Halfpenny (1/2) 60'; Pen: Halfpenny (2/2) 5', 25'

Liberty Stadium, Swansea
Referee: Romain Poite

== Players ==
=== Current squad ===
The following players were named in the South Africa Under-20 squad for the 2026 U20 Rugby Championship which kicks off on 27 April 2026 in Gqeberha.

- Caps updated: 29 June 2026 (after South Africa U20 vs Uruguay U20 Rugby World Championship Round 1)

Player	Position	Date of birth (age)	Caps	Club/province
Oliver Reid	Prop	27 June 2006 (age 20)	5	(South Africa) Stormers
Phiwayinkosi Kubheka	Prop	27 January 2006 (age 20)	7	(South Africa) Sharks
Jordan Jooste	Prop		2	(South Africa) Stormers
Kai Pratt	Prop	13 September 2007 (age 19)	4	(South Africa) Sharks
Danie Kruger	Prop	1 August 2006 (age 20)	7	(South Africa) Stormers
Bongani Dlamini	Prop		1	(South Africa) Bulls
Siphosethu Mnebelele	Hooker	18 February 2006 (age 20)	9	(South Africa) Bulls
Liam van Wyk	Hooker	26 October 2006 (age 20)	7	(South Africa) Sharks
Altus Rabe	Hooker		1	(South Africa) Stormers
Mahle Sithole	Hooker		6	(South Africa) Lions
Heinrich Theron	Lock	27 April 2006 (age 20)	6	(South Africa) Bulls
Jaythen Orange	Lock		2	(South Africa) Lions
Riley Norton (c)	Lock	2 January 2006 (age 20)	13	(South Africa) Stormers
JD Hattingh	Lock	27 March 2006 (age 20)	8	(South Africa) Lions
Kebotile Maake	Loose forward		6	(South Africa) Bulls
Risima Khosa	Loose forward		6	(South Africa) Lions
Wasi Vyambwera	Loose forward		5	(South Africa) Sharks
Luke Cannon	Loose forward		6	(South Africa) Lions
Gert Kemp	Loose forward	18 June 2007 (age 19)	4	(South Africa) Stormers
Thomas Beling	Loose forward		3	(South Africa) Bulls
Vuyo Gwiji	Loose forward		2	(South Africa) Lions
Quintin Potgieter	Loose forward		2	(South Africa) Stormers
Luan Olivier	Loose forward			(South Africa) Sharks
Jayden Brits	Scrum-half	18 June 2007 (age 19)	6	(South Africa) Stormers
Hendré Schoeman	Scrum-half		7	(South Africa) Bulls
Jandrian Goosen	Scrum-half	27 July 2007 (age 19)	1	(South Africa) Bulls
Yaqeen Ahmed	Fly-half	28 July 2006 (age 20)	6	(South Africa) Stormers
Vusi Moyo	Fly-half	21 June 2006 (age 20)	13	(South Africa) Sharks
Markus Muller	Centre	12 July 2007 (age 19)	3	(South Africa) Stormers
Ethan Adams	Centre	3 March 2007 (age 19)	6	(South Africa) Lions
Olunje Mehlomakulu	Centre			(South Africa) Stormers
Samuel Badenhorst	Centre	17 August 2006 (age 20)	6	(South Africa) Stormers
Pieter van der Merwe	Centre	16 February 2006 (age 20)	2	(South Africa) Bulls
Olunje Mehlomakulu	Centre		1	(South Africa) Sharks
Lindsey Jansen	Wing		4	(South Africa) Bulls
Jordan Steenkamp	Wing		4	(South Africa) Stormers
Khuthadzo Rasivhaga	Wing	12 November 2006 (age 19)	6	(South Africa) Sharks
Jack Benade	Wing	10 August 2006 (age 20)	4	(South Africa) Stormers
Jade Muller	Wing		3	(South Africa) Cheetahs
Cheswill Jooste	Wing	5 September 2006 (age 20)	9	(South Africa) Bulls
Junaide Stuart	Wing	26 June 2007 (age 19)	1	(South Africa) Bulls
Akahluwa Boqwana	Fullback	21 May 2006 (age 20)	4	(South Africa) Bulls
Zekhethelo Siyaya	Fullback	20 August 2007 (age 19)	2	(South Africa) Sharks
Luan Giliomee	Fullback		3	(South Africa) Sharks
Luan van der Berg	Fullback		4	(South Africa) Bulls
Christian Vorster	Centre	11 April 2007 (age 19)	1	(South Africa) Bulls
Alzeadon Felix	Fullback		4	(South Africa) Sharks

=== Previous squads ===
The following players played at previous editions of the World Rugby Under 20 Championship:

2025 South Africa Under–20 rugby union team
Name	AUS	ENG	SCO	ARG	NZL	App	Try	Con	Pen	DG	Pts
Simphiwe Ngobese	1	1		1	1	4	0	0	0	0	0
Siphosethu Mnebelele	2	2	17	2	2	4	0	0	0	0	0
Herman Lubbe	3	3	18 (substituted on)	3	3	5	1	0	0	0	5
Riley Norton (c)	4	4		4	4	4	0	0	0	0	0
JJ Theron	5	5	19 (substituted on)	5	5	5	2	0	0	0	10
Xola Nyali	6	6		6	6	4	2	0	0	0	10
Batho Hlekani	7	7	20 (substituted on)	7	7	5	0	0	0	0	0
Wandile Mlaba	8	8		8	8	4	0	0	0	0	0
Haashim Pead	9	9	21 (substituted on)	9	9	5	6	0	0	0	30
Vusi Moyo	10	10	10	10	10	5	0	21	7	0	63
Jaco Williams	23 (substituted on)	23 (substituted on)	11	11	11	5	4	0	0	0	20
Albie Bester	12	12		12	12	4	2	0	0	0	10
Demitre Erasmus	13		23 (substituted on)	13	13	4	0	0	0	0	0
Cheswill Jooste	14	14	14	14	14	5	3	0	0	0	15
Gilermo Mentoe	15	15	15	15	15	5	4	0	0	0	20
Jaundre Schoeman	16 (substituted on)	16 (substituted on)	2	16 (substituted on)	16 (substituted on)	5	0	0	0	0	0
Oliver Reid	17 (substituted on)	17 (substituted on)	1	17 (substituted on)	17 (substituted on)	5	1	0	0	0	5
Jean Erasmus	18 (substituted on)	18 (substituted on)	3	18 (substituted on)	18 (substituted on)	5	1	0	0	0	5
Jacobus Grobbelaar	19 (substituted on)	19 (substituted on)	4	19	19 (substituted on)	5	1	0	0	0	5
Matt Romao	20 (substituted on)	20 (substituted on)	7	20 (substituted on)	20 (substituted on)	5	0	0	0	0	0
Ceano Everson		21 (substituted on)	9	22 (substituted on)	22 (substituted on)	4	2	0	0	0	10
Stephanus Linde			8	21 (substituted on)	21 (substituted on)	3	1	0	0	0	5
Dominic Malgas	21 (substituted on)	9	22 (substituted on)	22 (substituted on)	9	4	1	1	0	0	7
Gino Cupido	13	13				2	0	0	0	0	0
Siya Ndlozi	11	11				2	2	0	0	0	10
Ian van der Merwe	22 (substituted on)		22 (substituted on)			2	0	7	0	0	14
Morne Venter			5			1	0	0	0	0	0
Thando Biyela			6			1	1	0	0	0	5
Phiwayinkosi Kubheka			17 (substituted on)			1	0	0	0	0	0
Erich Visser	21 (substituted on)					1	0	0	0	0	0
Total						5	34	29	7	0	249

2024 South Africa Under-20 rugby union team
Name	FIJ	ARG	ENG	ARG	WAL	Apps	Pts
Ruan Swart	1	1		1		3	0
Luca Bakkes	2	2	2		2	4	5
Zachary Porthen (c)	3	3	3	3	3	5	15
Jacobus Grobbelaar		4	19 (substituted on)	5	4	4	0
JF van Heerden	5	5	5	7	5	5	5
Sibabalwe Mahashe	6	21 (substituted on)	6	6	8	5	20
Batho Hlekani	4	7	7	19 (substituted on)	7	5	10
Tiaan Jacobs	8	8	20 (substituted on)	8		4	0
Asad Moos	9	9	9	9	9	2	10
Liam Koen	10	10	10		21 (substituted on)	4	21
Litelihle Bester	11	11	11	21	23 (substituted on)	5	0
Joshua Boulle	12	23 (substituted on)	12		12	4	0
Jurenzo Julius	13	13	13	13	13	5	20
Joel Leotlela	14	14		14	14	4	5
Michail Damon	15		15	15		3	5
Ethan Bester		16 (substituted on)	16 (substituted on)	2	16 (substituted on)	4	0
Liyema Ntshanga	17 (substituted on)	17 (substituted on)	17 (substituted on)	17 (substituted on)	17 (substituted on)	5	0
Casper Badenhorst	18 (substituted on)	18 (substituted on)	1	18 (substituted on)	1	5	0
Thomas Dyer		19 (substituted on)	4	4		3	0
Divan Fuller	20 (substituted on)		21 (substituted on)	20 (substituted on)	20 (substituted on)	4	0
Ezekiel Ngobeni	21 (substituted on)			23 (substituted on)	11	3	0
Tylor Sefoor	22 (substituted on)	22 (substituted on)	22 (substituted on)	10	10	5	19
Philip-Albert van Niekerk		12	23 (substituted on)	12	22 (substituted on)	4	0
Keanu Coetsee	19 (substituted on)	20 (substituted on)			6	3	0
Thabang Mphafi	7	6	8			3	0
Juan Smal	16 (substituted on)			16 (substituted on)		2	0
Herman Lubbe			18 (substituted on)		18 (substituted on)	2	0
Wandile Mlaba					19 (substituted on)	1	0
Bruce Sherwood		15		22 (substituted on)	15	3	0
Likhona Finca	23 (substituted on)		14			2	10
Haashim Pead				21 (substituted on)		1	0

2023 South Africa Under-20 rugby union team
Name	GEO	ITA	ARG	IRE	ENG	Apps	Pts
Corne Lavagna	17 (substituted on)	1	1	1	17 (substituted on)	5	0
Juann Else	2	2	2	2	2	5	15
Mawande Mdanda	3	3			3	3	0
Coetzee Le Roux	4		4	4	4	4	5
Jacob Frederick Nel Van Heerden	5	5	5	5		4	0
Paul De Villiers (c)	6	6	6	6	6	5	0
Ghudian Van Reenen	7	19 (substituted on)	7	7		4	0
Corne Beets		8	8	8	8	4	15
Imad Khan	9	21 (substituted on)	9	9	21 (substituted on)	5	11
Jean Smith	10		10	10	10	4	36
Michael Annies	23 (substituted on)	14	11	11	23 (substituted on)	5	0
Ethan Hooker	12		12	12		3	5
Katlego Letebele	13	13	13	13	13	5	10
Jurenzo Julius	14	23 (substituted on)	14	14	14	5	10
Hakeem Kunene	15		15	15		3	0
SJ Kotze	16 (substituted on)	16 (substituted on)	16 (substituted on)	16 (substituted on)	16 (substituted on)	5	0
Phatu Ganyane	1	17 (substituted on)	17 (substituted on)	17 (substituted on)	1	5	0
Zachary Porthen	18 (substituted on)	18 (substituted on)	18 (substituted on)	18 (substituted on)	18 (substituted on)	5	0
Jannes Potgieter	19 (substituted on)	7	19 (substituted on)	19 (substituted on)		4	0
Gcino Mdletshe	20 (substituted on)	20 (substituted on)			20 (substituted on)	3	0
Neil Le Roux	21 (substituted on)	9			9	3	0
Damian Markus	22 (substituted on)	12	22 (substituted on)	22 (substituted on)	12	5	5
Regan Izaks		15	23 (substituted on)	23 (substituted on)	15	4	0
Tiaan Wessels		4			5	2	0
Dian Heunis			3	3		2	0
Abulele Ndabambi	8		20 (substituted on)	20 (substituted on)	19 (substituted on)	4	0
Hennie Sieberhagen					7	1	5
Quewin Nortje		11			11	2	0
Litelihle Bester		22 (substituted on)			22 (substituted on)	2	0
Asad Moos			21 (substituted on)	21 (substituted on)		2	0
Sam Francis		10				1	0
Masande Mtshali	11					1	0

2019 South Africa Under-20 rugby union team
Name	GEO	IRL	FRA	ENG	NZL	Apps	Pts
Dian Bleuler	1	1	1	1	17 (substituted on)	5	0
Fez Mbatha	2	2	2	2	2	5	10
Asenathi Ntlabakanye	3	3	3	3	3	5	5
JJ van der Mescht	4	4	4	4	4	5	15
Emile van Heerden	5	5	25 (substituted on)	25		3	0
Jaco Labuschagne	6	21 (substituted on)	20	20 (substituted on)	6	4	0
Phepsi Buthelezi (c)	7	8	8	8	8	5	0
Francke Horn	8					1	5
Jaden Hendrikse	9	9	9	9	23 (substituted on)	5	38
James Mollentze	10	10	10	10		4	0
Caleb Dingaan	11	11	26	26	22 (substituted on)	3	0
Rikus Pretorius	12	12	12	12	12	5	10
Marnus Potgieter	13	13	13	13	25	4	0
Angelo Davids	14	14	14	14	14	5	5
Vaughen Isaacs	15	15	15	15	15	5	5
Dameon Venter	16 (substituted on)	16 (substituted on)	16 (substituted on)	16 (substituted on)	16 (substituted on)	5	0
Kudzwai Dube	17 (substituted on)	17 (substituted on)	17 (substituted on)	17 (substituted on)	1	5	5
Keagan Glade	18 (substituted on)	18 (substituted on)	18 (substituted on)	18 (substituted on)	18 (substituted on)	5	0
Thabiso Mdletshe	19	19	19	19	19 (substituted on)	1	0
Elrigh Louw	20	20 (substituted on)	5	5	5	4	0
Dylan Richardson	21 (substituted on)	6	6	6	20 (substituted on)	5	10
David Kriel	22	27	28	28	13	1	0
Sanele Nohamba	23 (substituted on)	23 (substituted on)	23 (substituted on)	23 (substituted on)	9	5	33
Celimpilo Gumede	24 (substituted on)	7	21 (substituted on)	21	7	4	0
David Coetzer	25	26 (substituted on)	27 (substituted on)	27 (substituted on)	10	4	8
Mnombo Zwelendaba	26		22	22 (substituted on)	26	1	0
Sibusiso Sangweni	27	24	7	7	21	2	0
Thaakir Abrahams	28	22 (substituted on)	11	11	11	4	15
Janko Swanepoel			24	24	24 (substituted on)	1	0

2018 South Africa Under-20 rugby union team
Name	GEO	IRL	FRA	ENG	NZL	Apps	Pts
Nathan McBeth	1	1	1			3	0
Dan Jooste	2	2			2	3	0
Sazi Sandi	3	18 (substituted on)	18 (substituted on)	3	3	5	15
Salmaan Moerat (c)	4	4	4	4	4	5	0
Ruan Nortjé	5	5	19 (substituted on)	5	5	5	10
Dian Schoonees	6	6	6	20	20 (substituted on)	4	0
PJ Steenkamp	7	20 (substituted on)	7	7		4	0
Muller Uys	8	8	8	8	8	5	15
Zak Burger	9	9	9	9		4	10
Damian Willemse	10	10				2	10
Sihle Njezula	11		23	23 (substituted on)	11	3	0
Rikus Pretorius	12			12		2	0
Wandisile Simelane	13	13	11	11	13	5	30
Tyrone Green	14	14	14	14	14	5	15
Gianni Lombard	15	15	15	15	15	5	21
Schalk Erasmus	16 (substituted on)	16 (substituted on)	2	16 (substituted on)	16 (substituted on)	5	5
Alulutho Tshakweni	17 (substituted on)	17 (substituted on)	17 (substituted on)	1	1	5	5
Asenathi Ntlabakanye	18 (substituted on)	3	3	18 (substituted on)	18 (substituted on)	5	10
Ruan Vermaak	19 (substituted on)	19 (substituted on)	5		19 (substituted on)	4	0
Ben-Jason Dixon	20 (substituted on)	7	20 (substituted on)	19 (substituted on)	7	5	0
Rewan Kruger	21 (substituted on)	21	21 (substituted on)		9	3	0
Lubabalo Dobela	22 (substituted on)	22 (substituted on)	10	22	22 (substituted on)	4	2
Lyle Hendricks	23 (substituted on)	12	12		12	4	0
Muller du Plessis		11				1	5
Manuel Rass		23 (substituted on)	13	13	23 (substituted on)	4	5
Tiaan van der Merwe			16 (substituted on)	2		2	5
David Coetzer			22 (substituted on)	10	10	3	0
Phepsi Buthelezi				6	6	2	0
Leon Lyons				17 (substituted on)	17 (substituted on)	2	0
Jack Hart				21	21 (substituted on)	1	0

2017 South Africa Under-20 rugby union team
Name	FRA	GEO	ARG	ENG	FRA	Apps	Pts
Gerhard Steenekamp	1	16 (substituted on)	16 (substituted on)	16 (substituted on)	1	5	0
Johan Grobbelaar	2	2	2	2	2	5	20
Carlü Sadie	3	3	3	3	3	5	0
Salmaan Moerat	4	4	19 (substituted on)	4	4	5	0
Ruben van Heerden	5		4	5	5	4	10
Zain Davids	6	20 (substituted on)			6	3	0
Ernst van Rhyn (c)	7	7	7	7	7	5	0
Juarno Augustus	8	8	8	8	8	5	35
Rewan Kruger	9					1	0
Curwin Bosch	10	23 (substituted on)	10	10		4	41
Wandisile Simelane	11	13	13	13	23 (substituted on)	5	10
David Brits	12				22 (substituted on)	2	5
Stedman Gans	13	22	22 (substituted on)	22 (substituted on)	13	4	0
Yaw Penxe	14	14	14	14	14	5	10
Manie Libbok	15	10	15	15	10	5	27
Kwenzo Blose	16 (substituted on)	1	1	1	16 (substituted on)	5	0
Dan Jooste	17	17 (substituted on)	17 (substituted on)	17	17 (substituted on)	3	0
Lee-Marvin Mazibuko	18 (substituted on)			18 (substituted on)		2	0
Hendré Stassen	19 (substituted on)	19 (substituted on)	5			3	0
Nama Xaba	20 (substituted on)					1	0
Francois de Villiers	21 (substituted on)	21	21 (substituted on)	21	21	2	5
Damian Willemse	22 (substituted on)	12	12	12	12	5	5
Gianni Lombard	23 (substituted on)	11	11	11	11	5	10
Reinhard Nothnagel		5		19 (substituted on)	19 (substituted on)	3	0
Len Massyn		6	6	6		3	0
Embrose Papier		9	9	9	9	4	5
Jeanluc Cilliers		15	23 (substituted on)	23	15	3	9
Wikus Groenewald		18 (substituted on)	18 (substituted on)		18 (substituted on)	3	0
Muller Uys			20 (substituted on)	20 (substituted on)	20 (substituted on)	3	0

2016 South Africa Under-20 rugby union team
Name	JPN	ARG	FRA	ENG	ARG	Apps	Pts
Kwenzo Blose	1				17 (substituted on)	2	0
Tango Balekile	2	2	16 (substituted on)	2	16 (substituted on)	5	0
Jaco Holtzhausen	3	18	18 (substituted on)	3		3	0
Cobus Wiese	4	20 (substituted on)	7	20 (substituted on)	7	5	0
Eli Snyman	5	5	5	5	5	5	0
Zain Davids	6	6	6	6	6	5	15
Ernst van Rhyn	7	7	19 (substituted on)	7		4	0
Junior Pokomela	8	8	8	8	8	5	0
James Hall	9	9	21 (substituted on)	21 (substituted on)	21 (substituted on)	5	0
Manie Libbok	10	15	10	10	10	5	15
Mosolwa Mafuma	11	11		14		3	5
JT Jackson	12	22 (substituted on)	12	12	12	5	5
Jeremy Ward (c)	13	13	13	13		4	10
S'busiso Nkosi	14	14	14			3	0
Curwin Bosch	15	10	15	15	15	5	63
Jan-Henning Campher	16 (substituted on)	16 (substituted on)	2	16 (substituted on)	2	5	5
Franco van den Berg	17 (substituted on)	1	1	17 (substituted on)	1	5	5
Carlü Sadie	18 (substituted on)	3	3	18 (substituted on)	3	5	5
Ruben de Villiers	19 (substituted on)	19 (substituted on)	4	4	4	5	0
Denzel Hill	20		20		20 (substituted on)	1	0
Embrose Papier	21 (substituted on)		9			2	5
Franco Naudé	22 (substituted on)	12	22 (substituted on)	22 (substituted on)	13	5	0
Keanu Vers	23 (substituted on)		23	23	23 (substituted on)	2	0
Eduard Zandberg		4		19 (substituted on)	19 (substituted on)	3	0
NJ Oosthuizen		17 (substituted on)	17 (substituted on)	1	18	3	0
Marco Jansen van Vuren		21 (substituted on)		9	9	3	0
Edwill van der Merwe		23 (substituted on)	11	11	11	4	15
Stedman Gans					14	1	0
Benhard Janse van Rensburg					22 (substituted on)	1	0

2015 South Africa Under-20 rugby union team
Name	ITA	SAM	AUS	ENG	FRA	Apps	Pts
Ox Nché	1	1	1	1	1	5	5
Jan van der Merwe	2	16 (substituted on)	16 (substituted on)	16 (substituted on)	2	5	5
Thomas du Toit	3	3	3	3	3	5	10
Abongile Nonkontwana	4				19	1	0
RG Snyman	5	5	5	5	5	5	0
Rikus Bothma	6			6		2	5
Jean-Luc du Preez	7	7	7	7	20 (substituted on)	5	0
Hanro Liebenberg (c)	8	8	8	8	8	5	10
Ivan van Zyl	9	9	9	9	9	5	0
Brandon Thomson	10	10	10	10	10	5	59
Leolin Zas	11	11	11	11	11	5	10
Daniël du Plessis	12	12	12	12	12	5	5
JT Jackson	13	13				2	0
Khanyo Ngcukana	14		14	14		3	5
Warrick Gelant	15	15	15	15	15	5	0
Joseph Dweba	16	2	2	2	16 (substituted on)	4	0
Njabulo Gumede	17 (substituted on)					1	0
Frans van Wyk	18 (substituted on)	18 (substituted on)	18 (substituted on)	18 (substituted on)	18 (substituted on)	5	5
Jason Jenkins	19 (substituted on)	4	4	4	4	5	15
Dan du Preez	20 (substituted on)	6	20 (substituted on)	20 (substituted on)	7	5	10
Marco Jansen van Vuren	21 (substituted on)	21 (substituted on)	21 (substituted on)	21	21	3	0
Tinus de Beer	22 (substituted on)	22 (substituted on)	22 (substituted on)	22	22 (substituted on)	4	6
Malcolm Jaer	23 (substituted on)			23 (substituted on)	14	3	5
Grant Hermanus		14	23 (substituted on)		23 (substituted on)	3	0
Mzamo Majola		17 (substituted on)	17 (substituted on)	17 (substituted on)	17 (substituted on)	4	0
Hyron Andrews		19 (substituted on)	19 (substituted on)	19		2	0
Jacques Vermeulen		20 (substituted on)	6		6	3	5
EW Viljoen		23 (substituted on)	13	13	13	4	0
penalty try							10

2014 South Africa Under-20 rugby union team
Name	SCO	NZL	SAM	NZL	ENG	Apps	Pts
Pierre Schoeman	1	17 (substituted on)	1	17 (substituted on)	17 (substituted on)	5	5
Malcolm Marx	2					1	5
Wilco Louw	3	18 (substituted on)	3	18 (substituted on)	18 (substituted on)	5	0
Abongile Nonkontwana	4	19 (substituted on)		19		2	0
Nico Janse van Rensburg	5	5	5	5	5	5	0
Jacques Vermeulen	6		7	6	6	4	0
Cyle Brink	7	7	20 (substituted on)	7	7	5	0
Aidon Davis	8	8	8	8	8	5	10
Zee Mkhabela	9	21	21	21	21	1	0
Handré Pollard (c)	10	10	10	10	10	5	65
Sergeal Petersen	11	11	14	11	11	5	15
André Esterhuizen	12		12	12	12	4	10
Jesse Kriel	13	13	15	13	13	5	25
Lloyd Greeff	14	14		14		3	15
Warrick Gelant	15	15	23 (substituted on)	15	15	5	10
Corniel Els	16	2	2	2	2	4	5
Dayan van der Westhuizen	17 (substituted on)	3	18	3	3	4	0
Thomas du Toit	18 (substituted on)	1		1	1	4	0
JD Schickerling	19 (substituted on)	4	4	4	4	5	0
Jean-Luc du Preez	20 (substituted on)	6			20 (substituted on)	3	0
JP Smith	21 (substituted on)	9	9	9	9	5	0
Jean-Luc du Plessis	22 (substituted on)	22 (substituted on)	22	22	22	2	2
Rohan Janse van Rensburg	23 (substituted on)					1	0
Dan Kriel		12	13	23 (substituted on)	14	4	0
Joseph Dweba		16 (substituted on)	16	16	16 (substituted on)	2	0
Victor Sekekete		20 (substituted on)	19	20	19	1	0
Duhan van der Merwe		23	11		23 (substituted on)	2	0
Thabo Mabuza			6			1	0
Nqoba Mxoli			17			0	0

2013 South Africa Under-20 rugby union team
Name	USA	ENG	FRA	WAL	NZL	Apps	Pts
Andrew Beerwinkel	1	1	17 (substituted on)	1	17	4	0
Jacques du Toit	2	2	2	2	16 (substituted on)	5	5
Luan de Bruin	3	3		3	3	4	5
Irné Herbst	4	4	4	4	4	5	5
Dennis Visser	5	5	5	5	5	5	0
Roelof Smit	6	6	6	6		4	5
Jacques du Plessis	7	7	7	7	7	5	5
Ruan Steenkamp (c)	8	8	8	8	6	5	10
Stefan Ungerer	9	9		9	9	4	5
Robert du Preez	10	10	21	10	21 (substituted on)	4	28
Seabelo Senatla	11	11	11	11	11	5	40
Handré Pollard	12	12	10	12	10	5	34
Justin Geduld	13	13		21 (substituted on)		3	10
Luther Obi	14	14	14	14	14	5	20
Cheslin Kolbe	15	15	15	15	15	5	10
Mike Willemse	16 (substituted on)	16 (substituted on)	16 (substituted on)	16 (substituted on)	2	5	10
Sti Sithole	17 (substituted on)	17 (substituted on)	1	17	1	4	0
Aidon Davis	18 (substituted on)	19	19 (substituted on)	18	8	3	0
Kwagga Smith	19 (substituted on)			19 (substituted on)	19 (substituted on)	3	10
Hanco Venter	20	20 (substituted on)	9			2	0
Dries Swanepoel	21 (substituted on)	21 (substituted on)	13	13	22	4	5
Jesse Kriel	22 (substituted on)	22 (substituted on)	22 (substituted on)	22	13	4	10
Marné Coetzee	23 (substituted on)	23 (substituted on)	3	23	23 (substituted on)	4	0
Jannes Kirsten		18	18 (substituted on)			1	0
Rohan Janse van Rensburg			12		12	2	0
Percy Williams			20	20 (substituted on)	20	1	0
Devon Martinus			23 (substituted on)			1	0
Jannie Stander					18	0	0

2012 South Africa Under-20 rugby union team
Name	IRL	ITA	ENG	ARG	NZL	Apps	Pts
Steven Kitshoff	1	1	1	1	1	5	5
Mark Pretorius	2	16	16 (substituted on)	2	2	4	5
Allan Dell	3	17 (substituted on)	17	17 (substituted on)	17 (substituted on)	4	0
Paul Willemse	4	4	4	4	4	5	10
Pieter-Steph du Toit	5	18 (substituted on)	7	7	7	5	5
Shaun Adendorff	6		6	6	19	3	10
Wiaan Liebenberg (c)	7	7		19 (substituted on)	6	4	0
Fabian Booysen	8	19 (substituted on)	8	8	8	5	0
Abrie Griesel	9	20 (substituted on)	20	20 (substituted on)	20	3	0
Tony Jantjies	10	21 (substituted on)		21 (substituted on)	21	3	19
Raymond Rhule	11			22 (substituted on)	14	3	10
Jan Serfontein	12	12	12	12	12	5	20
Patrick Howard	13	22 (substituted on)	11			3	5
Paul Jordaan	14		14	14		3	0
Dillyn Leyds	15		15	15	15	4	0
Jason Thomas	16 (substituted on)	2	2			3	0
Oli Kebble	17 (substituted on)	3	3	23 (substituted on)	23	4	0
Ruan Botha	18 (substituted on)	5	5	5	5	5	0
Braam Steyn	19	8	19	18 (substituted on)	18	2	5
Vian van der Watt	20 (substituted on)	9	9	9	9	5	10
Handré Pollard	21	10	10	10	10	4	42
Tshotso Mbovane	22 (substituted on)	14	22	11	11	4	0
Maks van Dyk	23 (substituted on)	23	23 (substituted on)	3	3	4	0
Khaya Majola		6	18			1	0
Travis Ismaiel		11			22	1	0
William Small-Smith		13	13	13		3	10
Marais Schmidt		15	21			1	0
Franco Marais				16 (substituted on)	16	1	0
Kobus van Wyk					13	1	0
Dean Hammond						0	0
Marvin Orie						0	0

2011 South Africa Under-20 rugby union team
Name	SCO	IRL	ENG	IRL	FIJ	Apps	Pts
Juan Schoeman	1		1		1	3	0
Bongi Mbonambi	2	16 (substituted on)	2	16 (substituted on)	2	5	0
Nick Schonert	3	17 (substituted on)	17 (substituted on)	3	17 (substituted on)	5	0
Jean Cook	4	18 (substituted on)	18 (substituted on)	4	4	5	0
Eben Etzebeth	5	5	5	5	5	5	5
Francois Kleinhans	6			6	19 (substituted on)	3	5
Siya Kolisi	7	19 (substituted on)	7			3	0
Arno Botha (c)	8	8	8	8	8	5	35
Pieter Rademan	9	20 (substituted on)	9	9	9	5	10
Johan Goosen	10	10	10	10	10	5	79
Wandile Mjekevu	11	11	11	11	11	5	20
Francois Venter	12	12	12	12	12	5	30
Paul Jordaan	13	22 (substituted on)	22 (substituted on)	22 (substituted on)	21 (substituted on)	5	5
Tshotsho Mbovane	14			14	14	3	25
Ulrich Beyers	15	15		15	15	4	0
Michael van Vuuren	16 (substituted on)	2	16 (substituted on)	2	16 (substituted on)	5	0
John-Roy Jenkinson	17 (substituted on)	3	3	17 (substituted on)	3	5	0
Ruan Venter	18	4	4			2	0
Cornell du Preez	19 (substituted on)	7	19 (substituted on)	7	7	5	5
Lohan Jacobs	20	9	20 (substituted on)	20 (substituted on)	20 (substituted on)	4	0
Johnny Welthagen	21 (substituted on)	21	21	21 (substituted on)		2	2
Craig Barry	22					0	0
Stephan Kotzé		1		1		2	0
Nizaam Carr		6	6	19 (substituted on)	6	4	10
Bradley Moolman		13	13			2	0
Courtnall Skosan		14	14		22 (substituted on)	3	5
Jaco Taute			15	13	13	3	15
Carl Wegner				18 (substituted on)	18 (substituted on)	2	0
penalty try							5

2010 South Africa Under-20 rugby union team
Name	TON	SCO	AUS	NZL	ENG	Apps	Pts
Brummer Badenhorst	1	1	1	1		4	5
Monde Hadebe	2	2	2	2	2	5	0
Marcel van der Merwe	3	3	3	3	3	5	10
Kene Okafor	4	4	4	4	4	5	5
Sebastian de Chaves	5	5	5	5	5	5	0
Siya Kolisi	6	6	6	6	6	5	10
Fanie van der Walt	7		7	7	7	4	0
CJ Stander (c)	8	8	8	8	8	5	5
Louis Schreuder	9	9	9	9	9	5	0
Elton Jantjies	10	10	10	10	10	5	12
Wandile Mjekevu	11	14	11	11	11	5	15
Francois Venter	12	12	12		12	4	5
Jaco Taute	13		13	13	13	4	5
Sampie Mastriet	14		14			2	5
Patrick Lambie	15	15	15	15	15	5	75
François du Toit	16 (substituted on)	16 (substituted on)	16 (substituted on)	16 (substituted on)	16	4	0
Ruan Dreyer	17 (substituted on)	17 (substituted on)	17 (substituted on)	17 (substituted on)	17 (substituted on)	5	0
Peet Marais	18 (substituted on)	19 (substituted on)				2	0
Mlungisi Bali	19	7	19 (substituted on)	18 (substituted on)	18 (substituted on)	4	0
Branco du Preez	20 (substituted on)	13	21 (substituted on)	12	21	4	5
Adri Jacobs	21	21		21 (substituted on)		1	0
Nico Scheepers	22 (substituted on)	22 (substituted on)	22	14	14	4	5
S'bura Sithole		11		22 (substituted on)	22 (substituted on)	3	20
Wessel du Rand		18 (substituted on)	18 (substituted on)		1	3	0
Tera Mtembu		20 (substituted on)	20 (substituted on)	19 (substituted on)	19 (substituted on)	4	0
Lohan Jacobs				20 (substituted on)	20 (substituted on)	2	0
Freddie Muller						0	0

2009 South Africa Under-20 rugby union team
Name	FIJ	ITA	FRA	ENG	AUS	Apps	Pts
Morné Mellett	1	18 (substituted on)	1	1	1	5	0
Kyle Cooper	2	16 (substituted on)	2	2	2	5	0
Julian Redelinghuys	3	3	17 (substituted on)	17	18 (substituted on)	4	0
Jandré Marais	4		4	4	4	4	5
David Bulbring	5	5	5	5	5	5	0
Marnus Schoeman	6	6	20 (substituted on)	6	6	5	0
Tendayi Chikukwa	7	19 (substituted on)	7			3	5
CJ Stander	8	8	8	8	8	5	10
Rudy Paige	9	20 (substituted on)	21 (substituted on)	21	20 (substituted on)	4	0
Francois Brummer	10		12	15	15	4	38
Sampie Mastriet	11		11	11	11	4	15
Johann Sadie	12	21 (substituted on)		22 (substituted on)	21 (substituted on)	4	5
Robert Ebersohn (c)	13	12	13	12	12	5	10
Clayton Blommetjies	14	22 (substituted on)				2	0
Sias Ebersohn	15	15	15			3	40
Zane Botha	16 (substituted on)	2	16 (substituted on)	16 (substituted on)	16 (substituted on)	5	0
Coenie Oosthuizen	17 (substituted on)	17 (substituted on)	3	3	3	5	0
Caylib Oosthuizen	18 (substituted on)	1	18 (substituted on)	18 (substituted on)	17 (substituted on)	5	0
Rynhardt Elstadt	19 (substituted on)		6	7		3	0
Stokkies Hanekom	20 (substituted on)	13	22 (substituted on)	13	13	5	10
Ross Cronjé	21 (substituted on)	9	9	9	9	5	5
Kene Okafor	22 (substituted on)	4	19 (substituted on)	19 (substituted on)	19 (substituted on)	5	0
Yaya Hartzenberg		7		20 (substituted on)	7	3	0
Lionel Cronjé		10	10	10	10	4	29
Tom Seabela		11			22 (substituted on)	2	10
Gerhard van den Heever		14	14	14	14	4	15

2008 South Africa Under-20 rugby union team
Name	USA	SCO	SAM	ENG	WAL	Apps	Pts
Jéan Rossouw	1		17		1	2	0
PW van Vuuren	2	16 (substituted on)	2	16 (substituted on)	16 (substituted on)	5	20
Wiehahn Herbst	3	17 (substituted on)		17 (substituted on)	3	4	0
Cornell Hess	4	5	5	5	5	5	0
Sabelo Nhlapo	5	19 (substituted on)	18	18	19 (substituted on)	3	5
Thiliphatu Marole	6	7	6	7	6	5	10
Nick Köster	7	18 (substituted on)	7	19 (substituted on)	7	5	5
Gerrit-Jan van Velze (c)	8	8	8	8	8	5	15
Dewaldt Duvenage	9	9	9	20	21 (substituted on)	4	0
Sias Ebersohn	10	20 (substituted on)	20	21	10	3	10
Lionel Mapoe	11	11		11	11	4	25
Robert Ebersohn	12	12	12	12	13	5	30
Stefan Watermeyer	13	13	13	13		4	20
Vainon Willis	14		21 (substituted on)	22 (substituted on)	22 (substituted on)	4	5
Cecil Afrika	15	21 (substituted on)	22	14	14	4	5
Henri Bantjes	16 (substituted on)	2	16 (substituted on)	2	2	5	0
Frik Kirsten	17 (substituted on)	3	3	3	17 (substituted on)	5	5
Martin Muller	18 (substituted on)	4	4	4	4	5	5
MB Lusaseni	19 (substituted on)		19			1	0
Francois Hougaard	20 (substituted on)			9	9	3	0
Francois Brummer	21 (substituted on)	10	10	10	12	5	67
Wilton Pietersen	22 (substituted on)	15	15	15	15	5	10
Corné Fourie		1	1	1	18 (substituted on)	4	0
Johan van Deventer		6		6	20 (substituted on)	3	10
Stephan Dippenaar		14	14			2	5
Tom Seabela		22 (substituted on)	11			2	5

== Coaches ==
=== Current coaching staff ===
The current coaching staff of the South African U20 national team is:

Coaches	Position
(South Africa) Kevin Foote	Head coach
(South Africa) Melusi Mthethwa	Attack Coach
(South Africa) Lumumba Currie	Forwards Coach
(South Africa) Willem Oliphant	Team Manager
(South Africa) Hayden Groepes	Assistant Coach
(South Africa) Joe Lewis	Assistant Coach
(South Africa) Thulani Nteta	Strength And Conditioning Coach

=== Coach results ===
The role of the South Africa Under-20 head coach focuses entirely on elite youth development and managing the transitional pathway into professional rugby. The Junior Springboks head coach operates as an academy mentor and talent identifier. Because age-grade squads reset completely every single year, long-term team building is impossible, and selection involves a fluid mix of school, university, and provincial academy structures. The following chronological list details the head coaches who have directed the Junior Springboks since age-grade rugby officially transitioned to the Under-20 format in 2008.

- Tests updated: 20 July 2026 (after South Africa U20 vs France U20 Rugby World Championship Final)

Name	Years	Tests	Won	Drew	Lost	Win percent	Accomplishments
(South Africa) Eric Sauls	2008–2010	15	11	0	4	73%	
(South Africa) Dawie Theron	2011–2016	30	22	0	8	73%	2012 IRB Junior World Championship
(South Africa) Chean Roux	2017-2020	15	10	1	4	67%	
(South Africa) Bafana Hleko	2021–2024	21	14	1	6	67%	2021 Under-20 International Series Win; 2022 U20 Summer Series Win
(South Africa) Kevin Foote	2024–present	19	17	0	2	89%	2025 World Rugby U20 Championship; 2026 U20 Rugby Championship; 2026 Under-20 International Series; 2026 World Rugby U20 Championship

== Winning Streak ==
The Junior Springboks' longest unbeaten streak is 21 consecutive matches (including friendlies) which they achieved between 9 June 2025 and still counting. Their current Test match record is currently 18 unbeaten games which they achieved between 29 June & still counting. These records were set under coach Kevin Foote and captain Riley Norton, and during this time the Junior Springboks scored more than 50 points 11 times including a 97-00 victory vs Chile, 82-25 vs Fiji, 57-14 vs Georgia, 95-27 vs UCT Ikeys, 75-19 vs Kenya, 56-17 vs Australia, 73-17 vs Australia, 73-14 vs Scotland, 104-07 vs Uruguay, 52-33 vs Wales and 53-37 vs England.
