= Asenathi Ntlabakanye =

South African rugby union player

- Full name: Asenathi Ntlabakanye
- Born: 15 April 1999 (age 27) Plettenberg Bay, South Africa
- Height: 1.83 m (6 ft 0 in)
- Weight: 153 kg (337 lb)
- School: St Stithians College

Rugby union career
- Position: Prop
- Current team: Lions / Golden Lions
Senior career
Years	Team	Apps	(Points)
2020–	Lions	83	(30)
2020–	Golden Lions	25	(5)
- Correct as of 26 October 2026
International career
Years	Team	Apps	(Points)
2018–2019	South Africa U20	10	(15)
2025-present	South Africa	4	(0)
- Correct as of 18 August 2025

Asenathi Ntlabakanye (born 15 April 1999) is a South African professional rugby union player who currently plays for the Lions in the United Rugby Championship and Golden Lions in the Currie Cup. His regular position is prop.

Ntlabakanye was named in the Lions squad for the Pro14 Rainbow Cup SA competition. He made his debut for the Lions in Round 2 of the Pro14 Rainbow Cup SA against the Sharks.

In May 2026, Ntlabakanye was banned for 18 months for anti-doping rule violations relating to unintentional use of anastrozole and DHEA.

== Honours ==
South Africa

- 2025 Rugby Championship winner
