= Zekhethelo Siyaya =

South African rugby player (born 2007)

- Full name: Zekhethelo Siyaya
- Born: 20 August 2007 (age 19) South Africa
- Height: 185 cm (6 ft 1 in)
- Weight: 90 kg (200 lb; 14 st 2 lb)
- School: Westville (South Africa)

Rugby union career
- Position: Wing/Fullback
- Current team: Sharks
Youth career
- 2024-2025: Sharks U18
Senior career
Years	Team	Apps	(Points)
2026–	Sharks	4	(5)
- Correct as of 17 May 2026
International career
Years	Team	Apps	(Points)
2024-2025	South Africa U18	5	(10)
2026–	South Africa U20	3	(0)
2026–	South Africa 'A	1	(0)
- Correct as of 22 June 2026

Zekhethelo Siyaya is a South African rugby union player who plays as a fullback or wing for the Sharks. He attended Westville Boys High School and progressed through the Sharks youth system before making his senior debut for the Sharks in 2026 against Ospreys during round 15 of the United Rugby Championship.

== Early life and education ==
Siyaya was educated at Westville Boys High School in Durban, South Africa. He came through schoolboy rugby in KwaZulu Natal and developed into a notable backline player during his time at the school.

== Rugby career ==
Siyaya represented the Sharks at youth level and played in age-group school competitions. He was selected for the Sharks U16 Grant Khomo Week side in 2023 and later was selected for the South African U18 Schools side in both 2024 and 2025.

Siyaya joined the Sharks pathway and was included in their senior setup in 2026. He made his Sharks debut in April 2026. Siyaya "raised eyebrows" across the United Rugby Championship by "impressing at fullback" during his first two appearances for the Sharks. On his fourth URC outing, Siyaya scored his first try for the Sharks, as it was described that "he twinkle-toed his way through Zebre's defenders like a hot knife through butter".

On 13 May 2026, Siyaya was called up to the Springboks squad alignment camp which included 10 uncapped players.

In June 2026, Siyaya was announced as a starting player in the South Africa 'A' side for their match against Zimbabwe in Gqeberha, starting at wing.
