= Zachary Porthen =

South Africa rugby union player

- Born: 31 March 2004 (age 22) Cape Town, South Africa
- Height: 189 cm (6 ft 2 in)
- Weight: 124 kg (273 lb; 19 st 7 lb)
- School: Wynberg Boys' High School
- University: University of Cape Town

Rugby union career
- Position: Prop
- Current team: Stormers / Western Province
Senior career
Years	Team	Apps	(Points)
2024–	Western Province		
2025–	Stormers	14	(0)
- Correct as of 26 October 2025
International career
Years	Team	Apps	(Points)
2023–2024	South Africa U20	12	(20)
2025–	South Africa	7	(5)
- Correct as of 7 September 2026

Zachary Porthen (born 31 March 2004) is a South African professional rugby union player, who plays for Western Province, the Stormers and South Africa. His preferred position is prop.

== Early career ==
Porthen attended Wynberg Boys' High School where he played for the first XV and was Head Prefect. He captained SA Schools in 2022, and in 2023 and 2024 represented South Africa at U20 level.

== Professional career ==
Porthen came through the Stormers academy, signing his first professional contract in 2023. He made his Currie Cup debut for the Western Province in 2024 and represented the team again in 2025. He made his debut for the Stormers in the 2024–25 United Rugby Championship against the Dragons.

In October 2025, he was called into the South Africa squad for the 2025 end-of-year rugby union internationals.

== International statistics ==
=== Test Match record ===
As of 27 September 2026

Against	P	W	D	L	Tri	Pts	%Won
Australia	1	0	0	1	0	0	0
Argentina	1	1	0	0	0	0	100
England	1	1	0	0	0	0	100
Italy	1	1	0	0	0	0	100
Japan	1	1	0	0	0	0	100
New Zealand	1	0	0	1	0	0	0
Scotland	1	1	0	0	1	5	100
Wales	1	1	0	0	0	0	100
Total	8	6	0	2	1	5	75

Pld = Games Played, W = Games Won, D = Games Drawn, L = Games Lost, Tri = Tries Scored, Pts = Points Scored

=== International tries ===
As of 11 July 2026

Try	Opposing team	Location	Venue	Competition	Date	Result	Score
1	Scotland	Pretoria, South Africa	Loftus Versfeld Stadium	2026 Nations Championship	11 July 2025	Win	42–28
