= Luan Giliomee =

South African rugby union player

- Born: 7 June 2006 (age 20) Ceres, South Africa
- Height: 170 cm (5 ft 7 in)
- Weight: 81 kg (179 lb; 12 st 11 lb)
- School: Hoërskool Charlie Hofmeyr

Rugby union career
- Position: Fly-half / Fullback
- Current team: Sharks
Senior career
Years	Team	Apps	(Points)
2026–	Sharks	3	(15)
- Correct as of 26 September 2026
International career
Years	Team	Apps	(Points)
2026	South Africa A	1	(4)
2026	South Africa U20	3	(17)
- Correct as of 26 September 2026
National sevens team
Years	Team		Comps
2026	South Africa		2
- Correct as of 26 September 2026

Luan Giliomee (born 7 June 2006) is a South African rugby union player, who plays for the Vodacom Bulls. His preferred position is fly-half or Fullback.

== Early career ==
Giliomee is from Ceres, and attended Charlie Hofmeyr Highschool where he captained the rugby side. He represented Boland at Craven Week in both 2023 and 2024, earning selection for South Africa Schools in 2024. In 2025, he joined the Sharks academy, helping the U21s to the title in 2025 and also earning selection for South Africa U19s. In 2026, he represented the South Africa U20 side.

== Professional career ==
Giliomee debuted for the Sharks during the 2025–26 United Rugby Championship, scoring a try on debut against Munster. He would make a further appearance against Cardiff, but suffered an injury during the match. While he would appear for the Sharks XV in the 2026 Currie Cup Premier Division, his next Sharks franchise appearance would be in the opening match of the 2026–27 United Rugby Championship season, scoring twice against the Ospreys. In April 2026, it was confirmed that Giliomee would join the Bulls, with the Bulls confirming in September he would join the side in October.

Giliomee was called to train with the South Africa Sevens side in December 2025, debuting for the side in the 2026 Singapore Sevens. In June 2026, he represented the South Africa A side against Zimbabwe.
