= Pieter van der Merwe =

Pieter Thomas van der Merwe MBE, DL is an English author on aspects of British maritime history. He focuses on the period from 1500 to 1914, but also writes on maritime archaeology and medieval shipbuilding. Other subjects include the history of Greenwich, marine painting, stage scene-painting and maritime life in art, portraiture, literature and drama. He is a graduate of the University of Manchester and the University of Bristol. He joined the staff of the National Maritime Museum in 1974 and was its General Editor until 2018.

He was appointed a Deputy Lieutenant for Greater London in 2012 and represents the Crown in the Royal Borough of Greenwich.

== Works ==
- The Spectacular Career of Clarkson Stanfield (exh.cat. with R. Took: 1979)
- Historic Maritime Greenwich (1993)
- A Refuge for All: Greenwich Hospital, 1694-1994 (1994)
- Nelson, an Illustrated History (contr. and ed., 1995)
- E. Dekker, Globes at Greenwich... (ed., with K. Lippincott and M. Blyzinsky, 1999)
- South: the Race to the Pole (and ed., with contributions from D. Preston, R.E. Feeney, L. McKernan, 2000)
- Captain Cook in the Pacific (with N. Rigby and G. Williams, 2002)
- Science and the French and British Navies, 1700-1850 (ed., 2003)
- Pioneers of the Pacific: Voyages of Exploration, 1787-1810 (with N. Rigby and G. Williams, 2005)
- The Queen's House, Greenwich [an illustrated history] (2012)
