= Frederick Kirsten =

American inventor, engineer and professor

Frederick Kurt Kirsten
- Born: 13 March 1885; Quersa, Meissen, Germany
- Died: 19 November 1952 (aged 67); Seattle, U.S.
- Occupations: professor; engineer; inventor

Frederick Kurt Kirsten (born Kurt Friederich Johannes Kirsten, March 13, 1885 - November 19, 1952) was an American professor, engineer and inventor.

Kirsten was born in Germany and immigrated to the United States in 1902. He graduated from University of Washington in 1909 and later taught there as a professor of aeronautical engineering. During his life he was granted numerous patents on a wide variety of subjects. Among his inventions were the Kirsten pipe (a tobacco pipe), and the Kirsten-Boeing propeller (a cycloidal propeller ). The Kirsten Wind Tunnel at University of Washington was promoted by and named after him.

== Inventions ==
=== Kirsten Pipe ===
The Kirsten pipe is a tobacco pipe with an aluminium body combined with a bowl and stem piece from more traditional materials. The metallic stem with its large inner diameter cools off the smoke while condensing moisture and supposedly removing harmful particles. Kirsten developed it after being told by his physician to stop smoking. To manufacture and sell these pipes he created the Kirsten Pipe Company that is still run by his descendants.

=== Kirsten-Boeing Propeller ===
The Kirsten-Boeing propeller is a cycloidal propeller that differs from other such propellers in that instead of the propeller blades being parallel to the motion of the craft, in Kirsten's design the blade going backwards is perpendicular, operating like a paddle. Kirsten first envisioned this propeller to be used in airplanes, but later realized it was more suited to be used in water. Unlike a cycloidal propeller controlled with a linkage, in Kirsten's design only direction can be controlled. The propeller can be also used as a turbine, and some research has been done to improve Kirsten's original design in this domain.
