= Vusi Moyo =

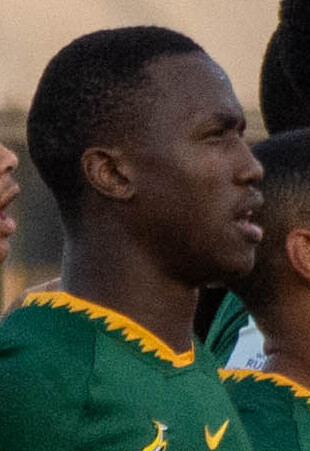
- Full name: Vusi Simphiwe Moyo
- Born: 21 June 2006 (age 20) South Africa
- Height: 182 cm (6 ft 0 in)
- Weight: 90 kg (200 lb; 14 st 2 lb)
- School: King Edward VII School, Johannesburg

Rugby union career
- Position: Fly-half
- Current team: Sharks
Youth career
- 2024: Lions U18
Senior career
| Years | Team | Apps | (Points) |
| 2025– | Sharks | 1 | (15) |
- Correct as of 22 June 2026
International career
| Years | Team | Apps | (Points) |
| 2024 | South Africa U18 | 2 | (13) |
| 2025-2026 | South Africa U20 | 11 | (84) |
| 2026– | South Africa | 1 | (6) |
- Correct as of 26 July 2026
Medal record
Men's rugby union
Representing South Africa
World Rugby U20 Championship
| Gold medal – first place | 2025 Italy | Squad |

Vusi Moyo (born 21 June 2006) is a South African professional rugby union player who plays as a fly-half for the Sharks. He progressed through the South Africa youth system, won the 2025 World Rugby U20 Championship before making his senior debut for the Sharks and the Springboks in 2026.

== Early life and education ==
Vusi Moyo matriculated from King Edward VII School (KES) in Johannesburg, South Africa in 2024.

== Rugby career ==
Moyo represented the Sharks at youth level and was selected for the South African U20 side in both 2025 and 2026. He also made his senior Springbok debut in an uncapped match against the Barbarians in Gqeberha in June 2026. Moyo made his capped international debut on 18 July 2026 against Wales, kicking three conversions. At 20 years and 27 days, he became the youngest fly-half in Springbok history.
