= Yaqeen Ahmed =

South African rugby union player

- Full name: Yaqeen Ahmed
- Born: 28 July 2006 (age 20) Cape Town, South Africa
- Height: 175 cm (5 ft 9 in)
- Weight: 86 kg (190 lb; 13 st 8 lb)
- School: Wynberg Boys' High School

Rugby union career
- Position: Flyhalf, Centre
- Current team: Stormers
Youth career
- 2024–2025: Western Province U18
- 2026–: Stormers Bolts
Senior career
Years	Team	Apps	(Points)
2026–	Stormers	2	(14)
- Correct as of 24 October 2026
International career
Years	Team	Apps	(Points)
2024	South Africa U18	2	(10)
2026–	South Africa U20	3	(42)
2026–	South Africa A	1	(11)
- Correct as of 19 May 2026

Yaqeen Ahmed is a South African rugby union player who plays as flyhalf for the Stormers. Ahmed currently plays for the South African U20 rugby side and was the top point scorer in the 2026 U20 Rugby Championship.

== Early life and education ==
Ahmed, otherwise known as "the chef" was born in South Africa and educated at Wynberg Boys' High School, a school in The Western Cape. He played for the school’s First Team in 2024 and 2025 and was selected for the Craven Week tournament in both years, representing the Western Province U18 side at South Africa’s premier schools rugby competition. He later represented the South African U18 side in 2024, marking his progression through the national age group system.

== Rugby career ==
=== Stormers ===
Ahmed signed with the Stormers at the end of his schooling career in 2025 and has been part of their setup ever since.

=== South Africa Under-20 ===
Ahmed was called up to the Junior Springboks squad in 2026 and made his debut during the 2026 U20 Rugby Championship. The Junior Springboks side won their first ever TRC title in 2026, with Ahmed being named the top points scorer.

=== South Africa A ===
Ahmed was called up to represent the Springboks A side in which he made his debut at flyhalf against Zimbabwe on 20 June 2026. Despite scoring a try and making 3 conversions, Yaqeen was sent off shortly after due to a dangerous tackle.
