= 2026–27 PREM Rugby Cup =

Rugby union cup competition

- Countries: England
- Number of teams: 10
- Date: 5 September 2025 – 13 March 2026
- Matches played: 20
- Tries scored: 207 (average 10.4 per match)
- Top point scorer: (England) Ciaran Donoghue (Bath) – 38 points

Official website
- www.premiershiprugby.com

The 2026–27 PREM Rugby Cup is the 54th season of England's national rugby union cup competition. this is the 8th season under the branding of Premiership Rugby Cup.

Leicester Tigers entered as defeating champions having beat Exeter Chiefs 66–14 in the previous final at Welford Road on 14 March 2026.

== Competition format ==
The format features all ten clubs from the 2026–27 Premiership Rugby. The ten teams are divided into two pools, each made up of five teams, playing eight games (four home, and four away) over ten rounds. The top two teams from each pool progress to the semi-finals, with the final being held one week after the semi-finals.

== Teams ==
All ten clubs from 2026–27 Premiership Rugby will compete.

== Pools ==
Pools and fixtures were announced on 14 July 2026.

Each team will play home and away matches against the other teams in the pool.

League points follow normal rules, 4 for a win, 2 for a draw, 0 for a loss, and bonus points for 4 tries or more and/or losing by 7 or less match points.

- On completion of the pool stage, each club will be ranked within its pool according to the following criteria:
1. The club with the greater number of league points will be ranked higher.
2. If league points are equal, the club with the most wins will be ranked higher.
3. If the number of wins is equal, the club with the superior points difference (points for minus points against) will be ranked higher.
4. If the points difference is equal, the club with the greater number of points scored will be ranked higher.
5. If points scored are equal, the club with the greater number of tries will be ranked higher.
6. If the number of tries is equal, the club with the fewest red cards will be ranked higher.
7. If the number of red cards is equal, the club that scored more points in the match between the tied clubs will be ranked higher.
8. If that match was also tied on points, the tournament director will conduct a draw between the tied clubs, with the first club drawn deemed the higher‑ranked.

=== Pool A ===
2026–27 PREM Rugby Cup Pool A table
Pos	Team	Pld	W	D	L	PF	PA	PD	TF	TA	TB	LB	Pts	Qualification
1	Sale Sharks	4	3	0	1	135	114	+21	21	18	3	0	15	Qualifies for play-offs
2	Bath	4	2	0	2	138	127	+11	21	18	4	0	12	Qualifies for play-offs
3	Gloucester	4	2	0	2	139	164	−25	20	26	3	1	12	
4	Exeter Chiefs	4	2	0	2	147	106	+41	23	15	3	0	11	
5	Bristol Bears	4	1	0	3	97	145	−48	15	23	1	1	6	

Updated to match(es) played on 21 November 2026. Source:

==== Round 1 ====
5 September 2026
15:00

(1 BP) Bristol Bears	43–40	Gloucester (2 BP)
Try: Pearce 2' m Halliwell 14' m Ibitoye 17' m Heward 26' c Thacker (2) 38' c, 40' c Williams 50' c Con: Williams (4/7) 27', 39', 41', 51'	Report	Try: Robson 5' c Redshaw 10' c Cokanasiga (2) 30' c, 43' m Clement 55' c Denny 74' c Con: C. Atkinson (4/5) 6', 11', 31', 56'; Byrne (1/1) 75'

Ashton Gate

6 September 2026
15:00

(1 BP) Sale Sharks	50–28	Bath (1 BP)
Try: Roebuck 3' m Carpenter (3) 27' m, 38' c, 43' c Raymont 49' c Roe 53' c Jibulu 57' c Longstaff 65' m Con: Lozowski (5/7) 39', 44', 50', 54', 58'	Report	Try: Tuipulotu 12' c Griffin 23' c Spandler 70' c Carr-Smith 80'; Con: Donoghue (4/4) 13', 24', 71', 80+1'

CorpAcq Stadium
Referee: Sara Cox

Bye/s: Exeter Chiefs

==== Round 2 ====
12 September 2026
15:00

(1 BP) Exeter Chiefs	45–21	Bristol Bears
Try: Woodburn (3) 9' m, 12' m, 20' c James (2) 47' c, 80' c Roots 51' c Penalty try 73'; Con: Skinner (4/6) 21', 48', 52', 80+1'	Report	Try: Williams 33' c Harris 55' c Penalty try 61'; Con: MacGinty (2/2) 34', 56'

Sandy Park
Referee: Henry Pearson

12 September 2026
15:00

(1 BP) Gloucester	43–26	Sale Sharks (1 BP)
Try: Redshaw 4' m Blake (2) 13' c, 40+2' c Joseph 19' c Thorley 26' c M. Knight 43' c Con: C. Atkinson (4/6) 14', 20', 27', 43'	Report	Try: Longstaff 21' c Hanson 25' c Jibulu 50' c O'Flaherty 53' m Con: Davies (3/4) 22', 26', 51'

Kingsholm
Referee: Craig Maxwell-Keys

Bye/s: Bath

==== Round 3 ====
6 November 2026
19:45

Sale Sharks	21–19	Bristol Bears (1 BP)
Try: Wills 9' c Reed (2) 18' c, 62' c Con: Davies (3/3) 10', 19', 63'	Report	Try: Auva'a 35' m Pepper (2) 45' c, 66' c Con: Worsley (2/3) 46', 67'

CorpAcq Stadium
Referee: Henry Pearson

7 November 2026
15:00

Exeter Chiefs	19–35	Bath (1 BP)
Try: McArthur 25' c Tuipulotu 34' m Harris 69' c Con: Coen (2/3) 26', 70'	Report	Try: Carr-Smith 5' c Harrison 18' c Donoghue 41' c Pearce 75' c Con: Donoghue (3/4) 6', 19', 42'; Pen: Donoghue (3/4) 29', 69', 80'

Sandy Park
Referee: Hamish Grant

Bye/s: Gloucester

==== Round 4 ====
13 November 2026
19:45

(1 BP) Sale Sharks	38–24	Exeter Chiefs (1 BP)
Try: Wills 13' c Ma'asi-White 17' c Longstaff 44' m Jibulu (2) 64' c, 71' m Penalty try 77'; Con: Davies (3/5) 14', 18', 65'	Report	Try: Poynton 11' m Coen 39' c McArthur 58' m Wolstenholme 69' c Con: Coen (2/4) 40', 70'

CorpAcq Stadium
Referee: Alexander Thomas

14 November 2026
14:00

(1 BP) Bath	36–44	Gloucester (1 BP)
Try: Spandler (2) 6' m, 40' c Muir 20' m Woods 36' c Offiah 44' c Pearce 76' m Con: Donoghue (3/6) 37', 41', 45'	Report	Try: Redshaw (2) 1' c, 15' c Edwards-Giraud 9' c Hathaway 25' c Taylor 47' c Con: Byrne (5/5) 2', 9', 16', 26', 48'; Pen: Byrne (3/3) 40', 51', 79'

Recreation Ground
Referee: Jamie Parr

Bye/s: Bristol Bears

==== Round 5 ====
20 November 2026
19:45

Bristol Bears	14–39	Bath (1 BP)
Try: Gwilliam 40+1' c Gammell 70' c Con: Williams (1/1) 40+2'; Worsley (1/1) 71'	Report	Try: Winters 16' c C. Griffin 22' m Bennett 45' m Emens (2) 51' m, 80+1' m Treacey 56' m Cutts 66' c Con: Donoghue (2/7) 17', 67'

Ashton Gate
Referee: Harry Walbaum

21 November 2026
16:30

(1 BP) Exeter Chiefs	59–12	Gloucester
Try: Butt 2' m McLeod (2) 19' c, 22' c Tuipulotu (3) 26' c, 74' c, 80+2' c Brown-Bampoe 35' m Poynton (2) 38' c, 71' c Con: Skinner (7/9) 20', 23', 27', 39', 72', 75', 80+3'	Report	Try: Wood (2) 55' c, 60' m Con: Byrne (1/2) 56'

Sandy Park
Referee: Sara Cox

Bye/s: Sale Sharks

=== Pool B ===
2026–27 PREM Rugby Cup Pool B table
Pos	Team	Pld	W	D	L	PF	PA	PD	TF	TA	TB	LB	Pts	Qualification
1	Saracens	4	4	0	0	212	104	+108	31	15	3	0	19	Qualifies for play-offs
2	Harlequins	4	3	0	1	145	111	+34	23	17	4	0	16	Qualifies for play-offs
3	Newcastle Red Bulls	4	2	0	2	137	133	+4	20	20	3	0	11	
4	Northampton Saints	4	1	0	3	105	193	−88	17	29	2	0	6	
5	Leicester Tigers	4	0	0	4	81	139	−58	12	22	1	1	2	

Updated to match(es) played on 21 November 2026. Source:

==== Round 1 ====
5 September 2026
15:00

(1 BP) Saracens	96–42	Northampton Saints (1 BP)
Try: Brantingham 9' c Hall 16' c Segun (2) 26' m, 44' c O'Driscoll 41' c James 46' c Va'enuku 49' c Malins 54' c J. Bracken (3) 57' c, 63' c, 66' c Elliott 61' c Michelow 73' c Penalty try 79'; Con: Hall (12/13) 10', 17', 42', 45', 47', 50', 55', 58', 62', 64', 67', 74'	Report	Try: Bennett (2) 21' c, 71' c Taylor 29' c Pater 35' c Catley 38' c Shields 65' c Con: Shields (6/6) 22', 30', 36', 39', 66', 72'

StoneX Stadium
Referee: Henry Pearson

5 September 2026
15:00

(1 BP) Harlequins	45–21	Leicester Tigers
Try: Driscoll (2) 5' c, 28' m Johnson-Holmes 13' c Povey (2) 20' m, 62' c Walker 44' c Bellamy 73' c Con: Slevin (4/6) 7', 14', 45', 63'; Bellamy (1/1) 74'	Report	Try: Carnduff 8' c Searle 48' c Wand 50' c Con: Searle (3/3) 9', 49', 51'

Twickenham Stoop
Referee: Karl Dickson

Bye/s: Newcastle Red Bulls

==== Round 2 ====
12 September 2026
15:00

(1 BP) Leicester Tigers	24–36	Newcastle Red Bulls (1 BP)
Try: Hamer-Webb 49' c Blamire 60' m Radwan 68' c Bemand 76' m Con: Woodward (2/4) 50', 69'	Report	Try: Rigg 5' c H. Obatoyinbo 12' c Hearle 28' c Kok 43' m Ferrie 66' c Con: Connon (3/4) 6', 13', 29'; Henry (1/1) 67'; Pen: Henry (1/1) 80+1'

Welford Road
Referee: Harry Walbaum

12 September 2026
16:45

(1 BP) Harlequins	29–14	Northampton Saints
Try: Hobson 8' m Kerr 39' c Townsend 51' m Anderson 58' m Bellamy 74' c Con: Bellamy (2/5) 40', 75'	Report	Try: Pearson 18' c Thame 25' c Con: Shields (2/2) 19', 26'

Twickenham Stoop
Referee: Joe James

Bye/s: Saracens

==== Round 3 ====
6 November 2026
19:45

(1 BP) Northampton Saints	39–19	Leicester Tigers
Try: Martin (2) 10' m, 46' m Rowe (2) 15' m, 40' m Thame 26' c Caqusau (2) 35' m, 57' c Con: Shields (2/7)	Report	Try: Moli (2) 30' c, 43' m Thomas 63' c Con: Woodward (1/2) 31'; Talbot (1/1) 64'

Franklin's Gardens
Referee: George Selwood

7 November 2026
15:00

(1 BP) Saracens	54–19	Newcastle Red Bulls
Try: James 9' c Rawlins 12' m Michelow (2) 15' c, 31' c Va'enuku 18' c Onyeama-Christie 37' c Knight 66' c C. Bracken 71' c Con: Davidson (7/8) 10', 16', 19', 32', 38', 67', 72'	Report	Try: Dalziel 51' c Baker 77' c Barreto 80' m Con: Dalziel (2/3) 52', 78'

StoneX Stadium
Referee: Joe James

Bye/s: Harlequins

==== Round 4 ====
14 November 2026
14:30

(1 BP) Newcastle Red Bulls	33–45	Harlequins (1 BP)
Try: Grayson (2) 13' c, 33' c Penalty try 63'; Hearle 66' m Carmichael 80+3' c Con: Dalziel (3/4) 14', 34', 80+4'	Report	Try: Slevin 6' c David (2) 20' c, 54' m Carr 35' c Staples 38' c Anderson 49' c Sharp 80' m Con: Slevin (5/7) 7', 21', 36', 40', 50'

Kingston Park
Referee: Harry Walbaum

15 November 2026
13:00

(1 BP) Leicester Tigers	17–19	Saracens
Try: Stooke 36' c Moli 45' c Con: Bailey (2/2) 37', 46'; Pen: Bailey (1/1) 63'	Report	Try: Elliott 42' m Va'enuku 51' c Hadfield 74' c Con: Davidson (1/2) 52'; Keylock (1/1) 75'

Welford Road
Referee: Henry Pearson

Bye/s: Northampton Saints

==== Round 5 ====
7 November 2026
12:00

(1 BP) Saracens	43–26	Harlequins (1 BP)
Try: Barbeary (2) 18' c, 28' c Va'enuku 21' c Caluori 39' c Michelow 40+2' m Segun 59' m Daly 79' m Con: Farrell (4/7) 19', 22', 29', 40'	Report	Try: Lang 9' m Friday 12' c Bradley 41' c David 56' c Con: Lang (3/4) 13', 42', 57'

StoneX Stadium
Referee: Joe James

21 November 2026
17:30

(1 BP) Newcastle Red Bulls	49–10	Northampton Saints
Try: Wade (2) 9' c, 35' c Jordan (2) 16' c, 71' c Harper 22' c Kok 54' c Hodge 56' c Con: Hodge (7/7) 10', 17', 23', 36', 55', 57', 72'	Report	Try: Rowe 3' m Benson 76' m

Kingston Park
Referee: Henry Pearson

Bye/s: Leicester Tigers
