= 2026 World Rugby Junior World Championship =

2026 World Rugby U20 Championship

Tournament details
- Host: Georgia
- Venue: 3
- Dates: 27 June – 18 July 2026
- Teams: 16

Final positions
- Champions: South Africa (3rd title)
- Runner-up: France
- Third place: New Zealand
- Fourth place: England

Tournament statistics
- Matches played: 40
- Tries scored: 406 (10.15 per match)
- Top scorer(s): (Argentina) Federico Serpa Laporte (63)
- Most tries: (Argentina) Simon Pfister (8)

The 2026 World Rugby Junior World Championship (Georgian: 2026 წლის 20-წლამდელთა მსოფლიო ჩემპიონატი რაგბში, romanized: 2026 ts'lis 20-ts'lamdelta msoplio chemp'ionat'i ragbshi) was the 16th premier age-grade (World Rugby Under-20 Championship) rugby union competition. The tournament will be hosted in Tbilisi and Kutaisi. This was the second edition to be held in Georgia, with first being in 2017. That edition was also hosted in Tbilisi and Kutaisi. This edition was the third to feature 16 teams, with first and second being 2008 (inaugural) and 2009 editions. The 16 participating teams were the 12 teams which participated in the 2025 edition, 12th team of 2024 edition and 3 teams that finished among the top 4 in the 2024 trophy.

== Teams ==
The following teams were the 16 participating teams in 2026 edition, with a summary of their previous results also given.

Team	Previous appearances	Most recent appearance	Result (2025)	Best previous result
Argentina	15	2025	3rd	3rd (2016, 2025)
Australia	15	2025	5th	2nd (2010, 2019)
England	15	2025	6th	Champions (2013, 2014, 2016, 2024)
Fiji	10	2024	—	6th (2011)
France	15	2025	4th	Champions (2018, 2019, 2023)
Georgia	7	2025	9th	8th (2023)
Ireland	15	2025	11th	2nd (2016, 2023)
Italy	13	2025	7th	7th (2025)
Japan	6	2023	—	10th (2015)
New Zealand	15	2025	2nd	Champions (2008, 2009, 2010, 2011, 2015, 2017)
Scotland	13	2025	10th	5th (2017)
South Africa	15	2025	Champions	Champions (2012, 2025)
Spain	2	2025	12th	11th (2024)
United States	2	2013	—	12th (2013)
Uruguay	1	2009	—	16th (2009)
Wales	15	2025	8th	2nd (2013)

== Law trials ==
Prior to the start of the tournament, it was announced that the 2026 edition of the Junior World Championships would be the first international competition to feature a trial of lowering the tackle height. Successful trials of a lower tackle height at the sternum in community rugby was introduced to elite rugby for the first time at the tournament.

In addition, the tournament also debuted a fully remote Television Match Official hub which was based at Hawk-Eye's headquarters in Basingstoke, England.

== Venues ==
Two main venues were announced on for the competition, with each pool allocated a venue for the group stage; Pools A and C, Avchala Rugby Stadium in Tbilisi, and Pools B and D, Aia Arena in Kutaisi.

Georgia's main national rugby stadium, Mikheil Meskhi Stadium will also be used for the third-place play-off and the Final.

All three venues were also the venues used when Georgia last hosted the U20 World Rugby Junior World Championship in 2017.

Tbilisi		Kutaisi
Mikheil Meskhi Stadium	Avchala Rugby Stadium	Aia Arena
Capacity: 22,754	Capacity: 3,500	Capacity: 4,860
2026 World Rugby Junior World Championship is located in Georgia

== Match officials ==
The following officials were named for the tournament, with an official panel of twelve referees designated to oversee the game, and four television match officials. Along side the World Rugby appointed officials, local home union referees were used as assistant referees.

Referees

- Christopher Allison (South Africa)
- Kevin Bralley (France)
- Ruairidh Campbell (Scotland)
- Ben Connor (Wales)
- Gonzalo de Achaval (Argentina)
- Robbie Jenkinson (Ireland)
- Reuben Keane (Australia)
- Saba Makharadze (Georgia)
- Luke Rogan (United States)
- George Selwood (England)
- David Vosalevu (Fiji)
- Morgan White (Hong Kong China)

Assistant referees

- Saba Abulashvili (Georgia)
- Sulkhan Chikhladze (Georgia)
- Mariam Goguadze (Georgia)
- Soso Japaridze (Georgia)
- Giga Mshvenieradze (Georgia)
- Papuna Tchiqaberidze (Georgia)
- Shota Tevzadze (Georgia)
- Shoti Tsagareishvili (Georgia)

Television match officials

- Paulo Duarte (Portugal)
- Francisco Gonzalez (Uruguay)
- Aled Griffiths (Wales)
- Matt Rodden (Hong Kong China)

== Pool stage ==
=== Pool A ===
Pos	Team	Pld	W	D	L	PF	PA	PD	TF	TA	TB	LB	Pts	Qualification
1	South Africa	3	3	0	0	189	45	+144	29	7	3	0	15	Advance to semi-finals
2	Wales	3	2	0	1	105	76	+29	15	12	2	0	10	Advance to fifth-place semi-finals
3	Georgia	3	1	0	2	85	61	+24	13	8	2	1	7	Advance to ninth-place semi-finals
4	Uruguay	3	0	0	3	10	207	−197	1	31	0	0	0	Advance to thirteenth-place semi-finals

Source: World Rugby

27 June 2026
18:00 GET (UTC+04)

Wales	25–24	Georgia (2 BP)
Try: James 5' c Cummings 16' m Leggatt-Jones 52' c Con: Leggatt-Jones (2/3) 6', 53'; Pen: Leggatt-Jones (2/2) 34', 60'; Cards: Bowen (yellow card) 42' (red card) 78'; Cook (yellow card) 75'	Report; Match details	Try: Shioshvili (2) 20' m, 37' c Razmadze 43' m Penalty try 76'; Con: Khalvashi (1/3) 38'; Cards: Tabatadze (yellow card) 64'

Avchala Rugby Stadium, Tbilisi
Referee: George Selwood (England)

27 June 2026
20:30 GET (UTC+04)

(1 BP) South Africa	104–7	Uruguay
Try: Muller 7' c Steenkamp (3) 11' c, 36' m, 70' c Penalty try 17'; Khosa (3) 24' m, 58' c, 62' c Adams 27' m Rasivhaga (2) 38' c, 40+3' c Jooste 42' c Brits (2) 45' m, 77' c Mnebelele 53' c Kemp 74' c Con: Felix (2/5) 7', 12'; Giliomee (3/4) 39', 40+4', 43'; Boqwana (6/6) 55', 59', 63', 71', 76', 77'	Report; Match details	Try: Rivero 80+2' c Con: Pereira (1/1) 80+3'; Cards: Perez (yellow card) 17'

Avchala Rugby Stadium, Tbilisi
Referee: Ruairidh Campbell (Scotland)

2 July 2026
13:00 GET (UTC+04)

(1 BP) Wales	47–0	Uruguay
Try: Emanuel (2) 13' c, 38' c Thomas 19' m Ridgway (2) 30' c, 50' c Leary 55' c Bowen 70' c Con: Lucas (5/6) 14', 31', 39', 52', 56'; Leggatt-Jones (1/1) 71'; Cards: Williams (yellow card) 17'; James (yellow card) 41'	Report; Match details	Cards: Ponte (yellow card) 74'

Avchala Rugby Stadium, Tbilisi
Referee: Robbie Jenkinson (Ireland)

2 July 2026
20:30 GET (UTC+04)

(1 BP) South Africa	33–5	Georgia
Try: Mnebelele (2) 22' m, 33' c Jooste 53' c Giliomee 59' m Cannon 79' c Con: Giliomee (3/5) 34', 54', 61'; Felix (1/1) 80'	Report; Match details	Try: Tabatadze 8' m Cards: Ezieshvili (red card); Tsiklauri (yellow card) 59'

Avchala Rugby Stadium, Tbilisi
Referee: Morgan White (Hong Kong China)

7 July 2026
18:00 GET (UTC+04)

(1 BP) South Africa	52–33	Wales (1 BP)
Try: Schoeman 12' c Adams 17' c Mnebelele (2) 25' m, 67' c Theron 38' c Khosa 43' c Van Wyk (2) 53' m, 62' c Con: Ahmed (6/8) 13', 18', 38', 44', 62', 68'; Cards: Jooste (yellow card) 46'	Report; Match details	Try: James 4' c Emanuel 10' c Lewis 49' c Bowen 55' m Edwards 79' c Con: Leggatt-Jones (3/4) 5', 11', 50'; Edwards (1/1) 79'; Cards: Pritchard (yellow card) 30'

Avchala Rugby Stadium, Tbilisi
Referee: Reuben Keane (Australia)

7 July 2026
20:30 GET (UTC+04)

(1 BP) Georgia	56–3	Uruguay
Try: Razmadze 7' c Dzodzuashvili 14' c Tabatadze 17' c Narsia (3) 40' c, 46' c, 80+3' c Nozadze 63' c Akhvlediani 65' c Con: Khalvashi (8/8) 8', 15', 17', 40+1', 47', 64', 66', 80+4'	Report; Match details	Pen: Pereira (1/1) 7'; Cards: Veglio (yellow card) 80'

Avchala Rugby Stadium, Tbilisi
Referee: Gonzalo de Achaval (Argentina)

=== Pool B ===
Pos	Team	Pld	W	D	L	PF	PA	PD	TF	TA	TB	LB	Pts	Qualification
1	New Zealand	3	3	0	0	119	62	+57	18	10	3	0	15	Advance to semi-finals
2	Scotland	3	2	0	1	107	100	+7	17	8	3	0	11	Advance to fifth-place semi-finals
3	Italy	3	1	0	2	88	108	−20	13	13	2	1	7	Advance to ninth-place semi-finals
4	Japan	3	0	0	3	78	122	−44	9	19	1	0	1	Advance to thirteenth-place semi-finals

Source: World Rugby

27 June 2026
13:00 GET (UTC+04)

(2 BP) Italy	32–38	Scotland (1 BP)
Try: Casarin 32' c Pelli 40+2' c Luisato 46' c Varotto 48' m Con: Braga (3/4) 33', 40+3', 47'; Pen: Braga (1/1) 52'; Andretti (1/1) 80+1'	Report; Match details	Try: Kelly 2' m Dalziel 37' c McHaffie (2) 40' c, 66' c Moncrieff 45' m Kesterton 72' c Con: Dalziel (4/6) 38', 40', 67', 73'

Aia Arena, Kutaisi
Referee: Robbie Jenkinson (Ireland)

27 June 2026
15:30 GET (UTC+04)

(1 BP) New Zealand	38–21	Japan
Try: Johnston 9' c Tocker 21' c Guerin 27' c Williams 52' m Woodley 62' c Muliaina 67' c Con: Muliaina (4/6) 10', 22', 28', 63'; Cards: Muliaina (yellow card) 35'	Report; Match details	Try: Sin 16' c Uchida 35' c Miura 39' c Con: Niwa (3/3) 17', 36', 40'

Aia Arena, Kutaisi
Referee: Luke Rogan (United States)

2 July 2026
18:00 GET (UTC+04)

(1 BP) New Zealand	36–26	Scotland (1 BP)
Try: Williams 18' c Norrie (2) 37' c, 41' m Pahulu 48' c Falloon 68' c Con: Muliaina (4/5) 19', 38', 49', 69'; Pen: Muliaina (1/1) 23'	Report; Match details	Try: Preston 40' c Roberts (2) 45' c, 56' m Kelly 80+4' c Con: Dalziel (3/4) 40+1', 46', 80+5'

Aia Arena, Kutaisi
Referee: Gonzalo de Achaval (Argentina)

2 July 2026
20:30 GET (UTC+04)

(1 BP) Italy	41–25	Japan
Try: Luisato 17' c Falchetto 38' c Casarin 42' c Patricio 58' c Pelli 65' m Varotto 73' m Con: Andretti (4/5) 18', 38', 43', 59'; Pen: Andretti (1/1) 28'; Cards: Miranda (yellow card) 52'; Patricio (yellow card) 61'	Report; Match details	Try: Fukuda 34' m Fukada 72' c Niwa 80+1' c Con: Niwa (2/3) 72', 80+2'; Pen: Niwa (2/2) 23', 30'

Aia Arena, Kutaisi
Referee: Ruairidh Campbell (Scotland)

7 July 2026
13:00 GET (UTC+04)

(1 BP) New Zealand	45–15	Italy
Try: Tocker 11' m Lewai 17' c Findlay 26' c Sinton 29' c Etuale 54' m Norrie 56' c Pahulu 63' c Con: Norrie (2/3) 18', 27'; Williams (3/4) 30', 57', 64'	Report; Match details	Try: Falchetto 3' m Opoku-Gyamfi 23' m Luisato 71' m Cards: Fardin (yellow card) 9'

Aia Arena, Kutaisi
Referee: Kevin Bralley (France)

7 July 2026
15:30 GET (UTC+04)

(1 BP) Scotland	43–32	Japan (1 BP)
Try: Fick 3' c Kelly 14' c Blyth-Lafferty 18' m Roberts 33' c McAughtrie 50' m Bryden 73' m Dalziel 79' c Con: Dalziel (4/7) 4', 15', 34', 79'; Cards: Blyth-Lafferty (yellow card) 40+1'	Report; Match details	Try: Tsumura 21' c Miura 37' m Uchida 58' c Fukada 65' c Con: Kobayashi (3/4) 22', 58', 66'; Pen: Kobayashi (2/2) 30', 76'

Aia Arena, Kutaisi
Referee: David Vosalevu (Fiji)

=== Pool C ===
Pos	Team	Pld	W	D	L	PF	PA	PD	TF	TA	TB	LB	Pts	Qualification
1	England	3	3	0	0	142	105	+37	20	11	3	0	15	Advance to semi-finals
2	Argentina	3	2	0	1	178	94	+84	26	16	3	1	12	Advance to fifth-place semi-finals
3	Ireland	3	1	0	2	140	118	+22	22	7	3	1	8	Advance to ninth-place semi-finals
4	United States	3	0	0	3	76	219	−143	11	33	0	1	1	Advance to thirteenth-place semi-finals

Source: World Rugby

27 June 2026
13:00 GET (UTC+04)

(1 BP) Argentina	78–14	United States
Try: Benavides 3' c Coll 23' c Cuneo Camargo 29' c Dande 35' c Serpa Laporte 38' c Pfister (3) 40' m, 44' c, 63' c Ordiz Yujnovsky 42' c Lescano 49' m Fernandez 75' m Preumayr 78' c Con: Serpa Laporte (7/9) 4', 24', 30', 36', 39', 43', 45'; Giannantonio (2/3) 63', 79'; Cards: Cambiasso (yellow card) 57'	Report; Match details	Try: Ofa 65' c Holder 70' c Con: Cadden (2/2) 66', 71'; Cards: Huntley (yellow card) 26'

Avchala Rugby Stadium, Tbilisi
Referee: Saba Makharadze (Georgia)

27 June 2026
15:30 GET (UTC+04)

(1 BP) England	34–27	Ireland (2 BP)
Try: Staples 15' c Pater 19' c Penalty try 23'; Knight 46' m Con: Shields (3/4) 15', 20', 46'; Pen: Shields (2/3) 38', 73'; Cards: Kelly (yellow card) 60'	Report; Match details	Try: Ryan (3) 2' c, 7' m, 43' m Byrne 67' m Deegan 69' m Con: O'Shea (1/3) 3'; Cards: McNeice (yellow card) 14'; Blaney (yellow card) 23'

Avchala Rugby Stadium, Tbilisi
Referee: Ben Connor (Wales)

2 July 2026
15:30 GET (UTC+04)

(1 BP) Argentina	62–40	Ireland (1 BP)
Try: Avaca (2) 3' c, 53' c Serpa Laporte 9' c Pfister (2) 34' c, 46' c Dande 36' c Lescano 74' c Giannantonio 76' c Con: Serpa Laporte (8/8) 4', 10', 35', 37', 47', 54', 75', 77'; Pen: Serpa Laporte 32', 72'; Cards: Yujnovsky (yellow card) 48'	Report; Match details	Try: Handley 20' c O'Shea (2) 49' c, 67' c Deegan 55'; McClean 60' c Neill 80' m Con: O'Shea (5/6) 21', 49', 55', 60', 68'; Cards: Ryan (yellow card) 31'

Avchala Rugby Stadium, Tbilisi
Referee: Reuben Keane (Australia)

2 July 2026
18:00 GET (UTC+04)

(1 BP) England	68–40	United States (1 BP)
Try: Lewis 2' c Cunnison 11' c Scola 20' c Gorleku (2) 27' c, 30' c Pearson 35' c Lilley 46' c Weimann 64' c Treacey 73' c Offiah 79' m Con: Keylock (9/10) 3', 12', 21', 28', 31', 36', 47', 65', 74'	Report; Match details	Try: Darbishire 14' c Bold 34' c Mitchell (3) 51' c, 61' m, 69' c Holder 55' c Con: Holder (5/6) 15', 35', 52', 56', 70'

Avchala Rugby Stadium, Tbilisi
Referee: David Vosalevu (Fiji)

7 July 2026
13:00 GET (UTC+04)

(1 BP) Ireland	73–22	United States
Try: Barrett 2' c O'Shea (3) 4' c, 28' c, 31' c Walsh (3) 17' m, 34' c, 53' c Carney 37' m Cooper 48' c Ryan 61' c Deegan 76' c Con: Green (9/11) 3', 5', 29', 32', 35', 49', 53', 62', 76'; Cards: Molony (yellow card) 42' (red card) 63'	Report; Match details	Try: Love 44' m Sarkees 59' c Keesler-Venables 74' c Con: Firebrace (2/3) 60', 75'; Pen: Cadden (1/1) 15'; Cards: Williams (yellow card) 55'

Avchala Rugby Stadium, Tbilisi
Referee: George Selwood (England)

7 July 2026
15:30 GET (UTC+04)

(2 BP) Argentina	38–40	England (1 BP)
Try: Dande 8' c Cuneo Camargo 27' m Lescano (2) 46' m, 72' c Pfister (2) 52' c, 78' c Con: Serpa Laporte (2/4) 9', 53'; Giannantonio (2/2) 72', 79'; Cards: Ordiz Yujnovsky (red card) 16'; Benavides (yellow card) 50'	Report; Match details	Try: Knight 13' c Pater (2) 20' c, 50' m Staples 36' c Ainsworth-Cave (2) 39' c, 42' c Con: Shields (5/6) 14', 21', 36', 40', 42'; Cards: Williams (yellow card) 69'; Knight (yellow card) 71'

Avchala Rugby Stadium, Tbilisi
Referee: Christopher Allison (South Africa)

=== Pool D ===
Pos	Team	Pld	W	D	L	PF	PA	PD	TF	TA	TB	LB	Pts	Qualification
1	France	3	3	0	0	136	76	+60	21	6	3	0	15	Advance to semi-finals
2	Australia	3	2	0	1	172	73	+99	27	9	3	1	12	Advance to fifth-place semi-finals
3	Fiji	3	1	0	2	61	124	−63	9	10	1	0	5	Advance to ninth-place semi-finals
4	Spain	3	0	0	3	80	176	−96	12	19	1	2	3	Advance to thirteenth-place semi-finals

Source: World Rugby

27 June 2026
18:00 GET (UTC+04)

(1 BP) France	45–15	Fiji
Try: Frisach 11' c Garault (3) 18' c, 35' m, 40' c Martin 28' c Andjisseramatchi 45' m Penalty try 55'; Con: Jurd (4/6) 12', 19', 29', 40+1'; Cards: Portat (yellow card) 73'	Report; Match details	Try: Roseruvakula 61' m Tuvasu Tabuakoto 73' c Con: Ledua (1/2) 74'; Pen: Ratu (1/1) 58'; Cards: Turagacoke (yellow card) 38'; Ratu (yellow card) 44'; Naevo (yellow card) 55'

Aia Arena, Kutaisi
Referee: Morgan White (Hong Kong China)

27 June 2026
20:30 GET (UTC+04)

(1 BP) Australia	90–22	Spain (1 BP)
Try: Cleverley 4' c Kruger (2) 9' c, 16' c El. Langi 21' c Grover 27' c Ed. Langi 31' c Geros 39' c Robinson 44' c Fittler (2) 53' c, 80' m Talaileva (2) 62' m, 65' m Blank 68' c Hollyman 75' m Con: Mackay (10/14) 5', 9', 17', 22', 27', 32', 40', 45', 54', 69'; Cards: Leota (yellow card) 49'	Report; Match details	Try: Farace 50' m Del Campo 56' m Garcia (2) 72' c, 80+3' m Con: Antem (1/2) 73'; Cards: Dela Fuente (yellow card) 5'; Pujana Lendinez (yellow card) 40+1'

Aia Arena, Kutaisi
Referee: Kevin Bralley (France)

2 July 2026
13:00 GET (UTC+04)

(1 BP) France	57–32	Spain (1 BP)
Try: Avogadro (2) 2' m, 26' m Frisach (2) 40' c, 74' c Baret (2) 46' c, 60' c Audebert (2) 48' c, 67' m Rates 76' c Con: Keletaona (3/4) 40+1', 47', 49'; Jurd (3/4) 61', 75', 77'; Cards: Basse (yellow card) 29'; Langlois (yellow card) 33'	Report; Match details	Try: Marsinyac Garcia (2) 5' m, 80+2' c Ibeoba 23' c Narvarte 36' m Salvador Asama 62' m Con: Hafoka Toca (2/5) 24', 80+3'; Pen: Hafoka Toca (1/1) 19'; Cards: Artigas (yellow card) 46'

Aia Arena, Kutaisi
Referee: Christopher Allison (South Africa)

2 July 2026
15:30 GET (UTC+04)

(1 BP) Australia	53–17	Fiji
Try: Brial (2) 5' c, 36' m Farr-Jones (2) 7' m, 59' m Kruger 15' m Pritchard 23' c Blank 31' c Le Maitre 64' m Grover 76' c Con: Mackay (3/6) 6', 24', 32'; Fowler (1/3) 77'; Cards: Job (yellow card) 19'; Ed. Langi (yellow card) 61'; Bird (yellow card) 71'	Report; Match details	Try: Nauvasi 51' c Roseruvakula 62' m Con: Ledua (2/2) 52', 63'; Pen: Ledua 14'; Cards: Qabale (yellow card) 27'; Serupepeli Ratulomai (yellow card) 36'; Tuvasu Tabuakoto (yellow card) 66'

Aia Arena, Kutaisi
Referee: Luke Rogan (United States)

7 July 2026
18:00 GET (UTC+04)

(1 BP) France	34–29	Australia (2 BP)
Try: Andjisseramatchi (2) 18' c, 26' c Rates 23' m Garault 43' m Tilloles 56' c Con: Keletaona (2/4) 18', 26'; Tilloles (1/1) 57'; Pen: Keletaona (1/1) 35'	Report; Match details	Try: Pritchard 3' m Cleverley 29' c Charlie 46' c Ed. Langi 61' c Con: Mackay (3/4) 29', 47', 61'; Pen: Bird (1/1) 77'; Cards: Brial (yellow card) 17'; Ross (yellow card) 52'

Aia Arena, Kutaisi
Referee: Ben Connor (Wales)

7 July 2026
20:30 GET (UTC+04)

(1 BP) Spain	26–29	Fiji (1 BP)
Try: Serrano 9' m Penalty try 15'; Farace 52' m Pen: Antem (2/2) 26', 34'; Hafoka Toca (1/1) 72'; Cards: Garcia (yellow card) 55'	Report; Match details	Try: Peters 22' c Koroinawai (2) 30' m, 35' m Dasalusalu 56' c Taka 66' m Con: Ledua (1/3) 23'; Ratu (1/2) 57'; Cards: Dasalusalu (yellow card) 15'

Aia Arena, Kutaisi
Referee: Saba Makharadze (Georgia)

== Seeding ==
Pos	Team	P	W	Diff.	Pts
1	South Africa (A)	3	3	+144	15
2	France (D)	3	3	+60	15
3	New Zealand (B)	3	3	+57	15
4	England (C)	3	3	+37	15
5	Australia (D)	3	2	+99	12
6	Argentina (C)	3	2	+84	12
7	Scotland (B)	3	2	+7	11
8	Wales (A)	3	2	+29	10
9	Ireland (C)	3	1	+22	8
10	Georgia (A)	3	1	+24	7
11	Italy (B)	3	1	–13	7
12	Fiji (D)	3	1	–63	5
13	Spain (D)	3	0	–96	3
14	Japan (B)	3	0	–44	1
15	United States (C)	3	0	–143	1
16	Uruguay (A)	3	0	–197	0

Updated to match(es) played on 9 July 2025. Source: World Rugby

== Knockout stage ==
The knockout stage will be contested by all 16 teams following the pool stage. Teams will be split into four brackets based on their pool rankings.

- The four pool winners will advance to the semi-finals to compete for the championship.
- The second-placed teams will compete for positions 5–8.
- The third-placed teams will compete for positions 9–12.
- The fourth-placed teams will compete for positions 13–16.

=== Thirteenth-place bracket ===
Semi-finals
12 July – Kutaisi
Japan	71
United States	21
12 July – Kutaisi
Spain	57
Uruguay	6

Thirteenth-place final
17 July – Kutaisi
Japan	34
Spain	26
Third place
17 July – Kutaisi
United States	39
Uruguay	15

==== Thirteenth-place semi-finals ====
12 July 2026
18:00 GET (UTC+04)

Japan	71–21	United States
Try: Iwakura (3) 4' c, 13' c, 50' c Fukada 25' c Uchida (2) 33' c, 46' m Suda 53' c Miura (3) 57' m, 67' c, 74' m Motoyama 62' c Con: Niwa (8/11) 4', 14', 26', 34', 51', 54', 62', 68'	Report; Match details	Try: Finicle 7' c Mitchell 38' c Darbishire 42' c Con: Cadden (3/3) 7', 39', 43'; Cards: Trower (yellow card) 23'; Huntley (yellow card) 66'; Booth (red card) 72'

Aia Arena, Kutaisi
Referee: Christopher Allison (South Africa)

12 July 2026
20:30 GET (UTC+04)

Spain	57–6	Uruguay
Try: Salvador Asama 5' c Chico Ayo 18' c Farace 28' m Garcia (2) 44' c, 58' m Del Campo 63' c Carreras Cuesta (2) 67' m, 78' c Enciso 71' c Con: Hafoka Toca (6/9) 5', 19', 45', 64', 72', 79'; Cards: Dela Fuente (yellow card) 70'	Report; Match details	Pen: Pereira (2/2) 2', 24'; Cards: Baccino (yellow card) 16'; Veglio (yellow card) 62'

Aia Arena, Kutaisi
Referee: Morgan White (Hong Kong China)

==== Fifteenth-place play-off ====
17 July 2026
18:00 GET (UTC+04)

United States	39–15	Uruguay
Try: Stewart 40' c Matelau 42' c Cluff 54' c Kirk 74' c Hill 78' m Con: Cadden (3/3) 40+1', 42', 55'; Firebrace (1/2) 75'; Pen: Cadden (1/2) 46'; Firebrace 67'	Report; Match details	Try: Pérez (3) 23' m, 29' m, 33' m

Aia Arena, Kutaisi
Referee: David Vosalevu (Fiji)

==== Thirteenth-place play-off ====
17 July 2026
20:30 GET (UTC+04)

Japan	34–26	Spain
Try: Fukada 21' m Iwakura 30' c Uchida 46' m Otabe 51' c Hyakutake 71' m Suda 78' m Con: Niwa (2/6) 31', 52'; Cards: Miura (yellow card) 36'; Kumagae (yellow card) 55'	Report; Match details	Try: Carreras Cuesta (2) 5' m, 36' c Farace 61' m Con: Hafoka Toca (1/3) 37'; Pen: Hafoka Toca (3) 19', 25', 74'; Cards: Farace (yellow card) 21'; Fisher Obieta (yellow card) 23'; Martinez Cattaneo (yellow card) 49'; Serrano (yellow card) 65'; Del Campo (yellow card) 70'

Aia Arena, Kutaisi
Referee: Saba Makharadze (Georgia)

=== Ninth-place bracket ===
Semi-finals
13 July – Kutaisi
Georgia	19
Italy	43
13 July – Kutaisi
Ireland	24
Fiji	19

Ninth-place final
18 July – Kutaisi
Italy	26
Ireland	34
Third place
18 July – Kutaisi
Georgia	10
Fiji	30

==== Ninth-place semi-finals ====
13 July 2026
18:00 GET (UTC+04)

Georgia	19–43	Italy
Try: Dzodzuashvili 13' c Razmadze 36' c Agniashvili 63' m Con: Khalvashi (2/3) 14', 37'; Cards: Devdariani (yellow card) 79'	Report; Match details	Try: Wilson (2) 2' m, 25' c Opoku-Gyamfi 5' m Celi (2) 9' c, 22' c De Novellis 15' c Con: Andretti (5/6) 7', 10', 16', 23', 26'; Pen: Andretti (1/1) 40+1'; Cards: Opoku-Gyamfi (yellow card) 46'; Wilson (yellow card) 63'

Aia Arena, Kutaisi
Referee: Luke Rogan (United States)

13 July 2026
20:30 GET (UTC+04)

Ireland	24–19	Fiji
Try: Ryan 12' c O'Connell 22' c O'Leary 43' c Con: Green (3/3) 12', 33', 44'; Pen: Green (1/1) 79'; Cards: Finn (yellow card) 38'; Waters (yellow card) 80+1'	Report; Match details	Try: Ratu 14' c Taka 35' m Rokosuka 73' c Con: Ledua (1/2) 15'; Lesimaikimatuku (1/1) 74'; Cards: Roseruvakula (yellow card) 58'; Tuvalu (yellow card) 68'

Aia Arena, Kutaisi
Referee: Gonzalo de Achaval (Argentina)

==== Eleventh-place play-off ====
18 July 2026
18:00 GET (UTC+04)

Georgia	10–30	Fiji
Try: Shioshvili 54' m Saldadze 70' m	Report; Match details	Try: Satala 1' m Koroi 25' c Koroinawai 38' m Vagadai 74' c Con: Maurice (1/3) 26'; Ledua (1/1) 75'; Pen: Ledua (2/3) 63', 65'; Cards: Tuvalu (yellow card) 49'; Peters (yellow card) 53'; Nauvasi (yellow card) 67'

Aia Arena, Kutaisi
Referee: Robbie Jenkinson (Ireland)

==== Ninth-place play-off ====
18 July 2026
20:30 GET (UTC+04)

Italy	26–34	Ireland
Try: Opoku-Gyamfi 9' c Meroi 17' c De Novellis 65' c Varotto 80' m Con: Andretti (3/3) 10', 18', 65'; Cards: Wilson (yellow card) 57'	Report; Match details	Try: Neill 6' c Maguire 16' c Molony 20' m O'Shea 70' m Walsh 77' c Con: Green (3/5) 7', 16', 77'; Pen: Green (1/1) 37'

Aia Arena, Kutaisi
Referee: Ruairidh Campbell (Scotland)

=== Fifth-place bracket ===
Semi-finals
12 July – Tbilisi
Argentina	26
Scotland	44
12 July – Tbilisi
Australia	36
Wales	38

Fifth-place final
17 July – Tbilisi
Scotland	28
Wales	21
Third place
17 July – Tbilisi
Argentina	29
Australia	52

==== Fifth place semi-finals ====
12 July 2026
18:00 GET (UTC+04)

Argentina	26–44	Scotland
Try: Penalty try 27'; Lescano 51' m Coll 60' c Fernandez 75' c Con: Serpa Laporte (2/3) 61', 76'; Cards: Ledesma Arocena (yellow card) 22'; Cambiasso (yellow card) 36'; Coll (yellow card) 69'	Report; Match details	Try: Blyth-Lafferty 8' m Roberts (2) 23' c, 63' m Moncrieff 32' m MacArthur 46' m McKenna 66' c Preston 70' m Con: Dalziel (3/7) 9', 24', 67'; Pen: Dalziel (1/1) 80+1'; Cards: Halkon (yellow card) 27'

Avchala Rugby Stadium, Tbilisi
Referee: Ben Connor (Wales)

12 July 2026
20:30 GET (UTC+04)

Australia	36–38	Wales
Try: Farr-Jones (2) 20' m, 31' m Blank 24' c Whitfeld 55' m Ed. Langi 67' c Greenfell 77' c Con: Mackay (1/4) 25'; Bird (2/2) 68', 78'; Cards: Brial (yellow card) 72'	Report; Match details	Try: Cummings (2) 14' c, 41' c Lewis 18' c Gwynne 48' c Penalty try 73'; Con: Leggatt-Jones (4/4) 15', 19', 42', 49'; Pen: Leggatt-Jones (1/1) 45'; Cards: Leggatt-Jones (yellow card) 20'; Evans (red card) 63'

Avchala Rugby Stadium, Tbilisi
Referee: Robbie Jenkinson (Ireland)

==== Seventh-place play-off ====
17 July 2026
18:00 GET (UTC+04)

Argentina	29–52	Australia
Try: Pfister 12' c Salinas Mallea 47' c Cambiasso 56' c Canedo 77' m Con: Serpa Laporte (3/3) 13', 48', 57'; Pen: Serpa Laporte (1/2) 16'	Report; Match details	Try: Greenfell (2) 2' c, 17' m Fittler 27' c Cleverley 33' c Farr-Jones (2) 37' c, 51' m Brial 41' c Swerling-Finaipepe 61' c Con: Bird (6/8) 3', 28', 34', 38', 42', 62'

Avchala Rugby Stadium, Tbilisi
Referee: Kevin Bralley (France)

==== Fifth-place play-off ====
17 July 2026
20:30 GET (UTC+04)

Scotland	28–21	Wales
Try: Blyth-Lafferty 33' c Kesterton 35' c Roberts 47' c Kelly 64' c Con: Dalziel (4/4) 33', 36', 48', 65'; Cards: Fick (yellow card) 74'; Caven (yellow card) 77'	Report; Match details	Try: Evans 10' c Pritchard 28' c Edwards 59' c Con: Leggatt-Jones (2/2) 11', 29'; Lucas (1/1) 60'; Cards: Evans (yellow card) 45'; Bowen (yellow card) 62'

Avchala Rugby Stadium, Tbilisi
Referee: Gonzalo de Achaval (Argentina)

=== Championship bracket ===
Semi-finals
13 July – Tbilisi
France	26
New Zealand	22
13 July – Tbilisi
South Africa	53
England	37

Final
18 July – Tbilisi
France	5
South Africa	16
Third place
18 July – Tbilisi
New Zealand	41
England	26

==== Semi-finals ====
13 July 2026
18:00 GET (UTC+04)

France	26–22	New Zealand
Try: Garault (2) 20' c, 33' c Masi 61' m Drault 76' c Con: Keletaona (2) 21', 34'; Jurd (1/1) 77'	Match details	Try: Webber 7' c Stuart 27' m McLeod 58' c Con: Norrie (2/3) 8', 59'; Pen: Muliaina (1/1) 72'; Cards: Fale (yellow card) 21'; Woodley (yellow card) 61'

Avchala Rugby Stadium, Tbilisi
Referee: George Selwood (England)

13 July 2026
20:30 GET (UTC+04)

South Africa	53–37	England
Try: Ahmed 12' c Rasivhaga (3) 34' m, 42' c, 53' c Maake (2) 48' c, 50' c Cannon 59' c Con: Ahmed (6/7) 13', 43', 48', 51', 54', 60'; Pen: Ahmed (2/3) 62', 69'; Cards: Giliomee (red card) 64'	Match details	Try: Streeter 4' c Shields (2) 30' c, 79' m Weimann 55' m Williams 65' c Con: Shields (3/5) 5', 31', 66'; Pen: Shields (2/2) 18', 40'; Cards: Kelly (red card) 32'

Avchala Rugby Stadium, Tbilisi
Referee: Kevin Bralley (France)

==== Third-place play-off ====
18 July 2026
18:00 GET (UTC+04)

New Zealand	41–26	England
Try: Frost (2) 5' m, 27' m Hutchings 45' m Pahulu 51' c McLeod (2) 64' m, 66' c Fale 78' c Con: Williams (3/5) 52', 67', 79'; Cards: McLeod (yellow card) 22'	Report; Match details	Try: Winters 2' m Staples (2) 29' c, 49' c Offiah 72' m Con: Shields (1/1) 2'; Keylock (2/3) 30', 49'; Cards: Lilley (yellow card) 14'

Mikheil Meskhi Stadium, Tbilisi
Referee: Ben Connor (Wales)

==== Final ====
18 July 2026
20:30 GET (UTC+04)

South Africa	16–5	France
Try: Muller 67' c Con: Ahmed (1/1) 68' c Pen: Ahmed (3/3) 9’, 40’, 79'	Report; Match details	Try: Audebert 45' m

Mikheil Meskhi Stadium, Tbilisi
Referee: Reuben Keane (Australia)
