= 2026–27 EPCR Challenge Cup pool stage =

EPCR Challenge Cup pool stage

The 2026–27 EPCR Challenge Cup pool stage will be the first of two stages of the 32nd season of the pan-European professional club rugby union competition. It will be the 13th under the EPCR Challenge Cup format. Eighteen clubs from three major domestic and regional leagues will compete over four rounds of pool fixtures. Nine teams will be progressing to the second and final stage, the knockout stage.

== Structure ==
The pool stage draw took place on 1 July 2026, with the complete fixture list later announced on 10 July 2026. The fixtures will be played out across four weekends between 16 October 2026 and 17 January 2027.

Teams in the same pool played four of the other five teams in their pool, either at home or away, in the pool stage. The top four teams in each pool progressed to the round of 16 as well as the fifth-ranked team from each Champions Cup pool.

Teams was awarded table points based on match performances; four points for a win, two points for a draw, one bonus point for scoring four or more tries in a match and one bonus point for losing a match by seven points or fewer.

In the event of a tie between two or more teams, the following tie-breakers were used, as directed by European Professional Club Rugby:

1. Where teams have played each other
  1. The club with the greater number of competition points from only matches involving tied teams.
  2. If equal, the club with the best aggregate points difference from those matches.
  3. If equal, the club that scored the most tries in those matches.
2. Where teams remain tied and/or have not played each other in the competition (i.e. are from different pools)
  1. The club with the best aggregate points difference from the pool stage.
  2. If equal, the club that scored the most tries in the pool stage.
  3. If equal, the club with the fewest players suspended in the pool stage.
  4. If equal, the drawing of lots will determine a club's ranking.

== Pool 1 ==
EPCR Challenge Cup Pool 1
Pos	Team	Pld	W	D	L	PF	PA	PD	TF	TA	TB	LB	Pts	Qualification
1	(Ireland) Ulster	1	1	0	0	40	21	+19	6	3	1	0	5	Home round of 16
2	(Wales) Dragons	1	1	0	0	29	14	+15	4	2	0	0	4	Home round of 16
3	(France) Bayonne	1	1	0	0	29	27	+2	5	3	0	0	4	Home round of 16
4	(South Africa) Cheetahs	1	0	0	1	27	29	−2	3	5	0	1	1	Away round of 16
5	(France) Perpignan	1	0	0	1	14	29	−15	2	4	0	0	0	
6	(Italy) Zebre Parma	1	0	0	1	21	40	−19	3	6	0	0	0	

First match(es) will be played: 16 October 2026. Source: EPCR
Rules for classification: Tiebreakers for teams tied on points: 1) Number of matches won; 2) Difference between points for and against; 3) Total number of points for; 4) Aggregate number of points scored in matches between tied teams; 5) Number of matches won excluding the first match, then the second and so on until the tie is settled.

=== Round 1 ===
16 October 2026
20:00

Dragons (Wales)	29–14	(France) Perpignan
Try: Rosser 12' m Owen 55' c Tuitavuki 67' c Paea 76' c Con: de Beer (3/3) 56' 68' 77'; Pen: de Beer (1/1) 64'	Report	Try: Coulon 29' c Tuilagi 61' c Con: Tedder (2/2) 29', 62'

Rodney Parade, Newport
Attendance: 4,636
Referee: Hanru van Rooyen (South Africa)

17 October 2026
16:15

Zebre Parma (Italy)	21–40	(Ireland) Ulster (1 BP)
Try: Licata 43' c Ortombina 63' c Montemauri 73' c Con: Da Re (1/1) 44'; Montemauri (2/2) 63', 73'; Cards: Baronio (yellow card) 68'	Report	Try: Walker (2) 12' c, 28' c Stockdale 20' m McCann 47' c Lowry 70' c Moloney 77' c Con: Doak (3/4) 13', 29', 48'; Benson (2/2) 71', 78'; Cards: Murphy (yellow card) 61'

Stadio Sergio Lanfranchi, Parma
Attendance: 2,861
Referee: Ben Connor (Wales)

18 October 2026
14:00

Bayonne (France)	29–27	(South Africa) Cheetahs (1 BP)
Try: Bosch (2) 14' m, 37' m Mori 19' c Orabé 27' m Jantjies 66' c Con: du Preez (2/5) 20', 67'	Report	Try: Annies 8' c Coetzee 43' c van der Westhuizen 51' c Con: Swanepoel (3/3) 9', 44', 52'; Pen: Swanepoel (2/4) 3', 25'

Stade Jean-Dauger, Bayonne
Attendance: 14,563
Referee: Sara Cox (England)

=== Round 2 ===
12 December 2026
13:00

Ulster (Ireland)	v	(France) Bayonne

Affidea Stadium, Belfast

13 December 2026
13:00

Cheetahs (South Africa)	v	(Wales) Dragons

St Helen's, Swansea

13 December 2026
16:15

Perpignan (France)	v	(Italy) Zebre Parma

Stade Aimé Giral, Perpignan

=== Round 3 ===
8 January 2027
20:00

Dragons (Wales)	v	(France) Bayonne

Rodney Parade, Newport

10 January 2027
14:00

Perpignan (France)	v	(Ireland) Ulster

Stade Aimé Giral, Perpignan

10 January 2027
18:30

Zebre Parma (Italy)	v	(South Africa) Cheetahs

Stadio Sergio Lanfranchi, Parma

=== Round 4 ===
16 January 2026
14:00

Bayonne (France)	v	(Italy) Zebre Parma

Stade Jean-Dauger, Bayonne

16 January 2027
15:15

Ulster (Ireland)	v	(Wales) Dragons

Affidea Stadium, Belfast

17 January 2027
15:15

Cheetahs (South Africa)	v	(France) Perpignan

St Helen's, Swansea

== Pool 2 ==
EPCR Challenge Cup Pool 2
Pos	Team	Pld	W	D	L	PF	PA	PD	TF	TA	TB	LB	Pts	Qualification
1	(Wales) Scarlets	1	1	0	0	47	14	+33	7	2	1	0	5	Home round of 16
2	(France) Castres	1	1	0	0	18	9	+9	2	0	0	0	4	Home round of 16
3	(South Africa) Sharks	1	1	0	0	40	33	+7	6	5	0	0	4	Home round of 16
4	(France) Lyon	1	0	0	1	33	40	−7	5	6	0	1	1	Away round of 16
5	(Italy) Benetton	1	0	0	1	9	18	−9	0	2	0	0	0	
6	(England) Newcastle Red Bulls	1	0	0	1	14	47	−33	2	7	0	0	0	

First match(es) will be played: 17 October 2026. Source: EPCR
Rules for classification: Tiebreakers for teams tied on points: 1) Number of matches won; 2) Difference between points for and against; 3) Total number of points for; 4) Aggregate number of points scored in matches between tied teams; 5) Number of matches won excluding the first match, then the second and so on until the tie is settled.

=== Round 1 ===
17 October 2026
14:00

Lyon (France)	33–40	(South Africa) Sharks
Try: Seguret 21'c Ioane 29' c Baret 45' c Lorre 66' m Couilloud 79' c Con: Jackson (4/5) 22' 30' 46' 79'	Report	Try: Bester (2) 6' m 81' c Williams 17' c Ganyane 35' c Hatton 55' c Siyaya 61'; Con: Hendrikse (5/6) 18' 36' 56' 62' 80+2'

Mahmut Stadium, Lyon
Attendance: 10,666
Referee: Federico Vedovelli (Italy)

17 October 2026
20:00

Scarlets (Wales)	47–14	(England) Newcastle Red Bulls
Try: Costelow 12' c Anderson 21' m Williams 26' c G. Davies 39' c Mee 54' c Page (2) 55' c, 65' c Con: Costelow (2/3) 13', 26'; Hawkins (4/4) 40', 54', 56', 65'	Report	Try: Spencer 69' c Leatherbarrow 77' c Con: Hodge (2/2) 70', 77'; Cards: McCallum (yellow card) 53'

Parc y Scarlets, Llanelli
Attendance: 5,692
Referee: Evan Urruzmendi (France)

18 October 2026
18:30

Castres (France)	18–9	(Italy) Benetton
Try: Botitu 31' m Baget 77' c Con: le Brun (1/2) 78'; Pen: le Brun (2/3) 6', 68'	Report	Pen: Umaga (3/4) 50', 55', 59'

Stade Pierre-Fabre, Castres
Attendance: 9,856
Referee: Morné Ferreira (South Africa)

=== Round 2 ===
12 December 2026
18:30

Benetton (Italy)	v	(France) Lyon

Stadio Comunale di Monigo, Treviso

12 December 2026
19:30

Sharks (South Africa)	v	(Wales) Scarlets

Hollywoodbets Kings Park, Durban

12 December 2026
20:00

Newcastle Red Bulls (England)	v	(France) Castres

Kingston Park, Newcastle

=== Round 3 ===
8 January 2027
20:00

Newcastle Red Bulls (England)	v	(Italy) Benetton

Kingston Park, Newcastle

9 January 2027
15:00

Sharks (South Africa)	v	(France) Castres

Hollywoodbets Kings Park, Durban

9 January 2027
20:00

Scarlets (Wales)	v	(France) Lyon

Parc y Scarlets, Llanelli

=== Round 4 ===
16 January 2027
16:15

Castres (France)	v	(Wales) Scarlets

Stade Pierre-Fabre, Castres

16 January 2027
17:30

Benetton (Italy)	v	(South Africa) Sharks

Stadio Comunale di Monigo, Treviso

17 January 2027
14:00

Lyon (France)	v	(England) Newcastle Red Bulls

Mahmut Stadium, Lyon

== Pool 3 ==
EPCR Challenge Cup Pool 3
Pos	Team	Pld	W	D	L	PF	PA	PD	TF	TA	TB	LB	Pts	Qualification
1	(England) Harlequins	1	1	0	0	57	19	+38	9	3	1	0	5	Home round of 16
2	(Wales) Ospreys	1	1	0	0	39	14	+25	7	2	1	0	5	Home round of 16
3	(France) Toulon	1	1	0	0	27	17	+10	3	2	0	0	4	Home round of 16
4	(Scotland) Edinburgh	1	0	0	1	17	27	−10	2	3	0	0	0	Away round of 16
5	(Georgia (country)) Black Lion	1	0	0	1	14	39	−25	2	7	0	0	0	
6	(France) Vannes	1	0	0	1	19	57	−38	3	9	0	0	0	

First match(es) will be played: 16 October 2026. Source: EPCR
Rules for classification: Tiebreakers for teams tied on points: 1) Number of matches won; 2) Difference between points for and against; 3) Total number of points for; 4) Aggregate number of points scored in matches between tied teams; 5) Number of matches won excluding the first match, then the second and so on until the tie is settled.

=== Round 1 ===
16 October 2026
20:00

Edinburgh (Scotland)	17–27	(France) Toulon
Try: Ashman 44' c Gwynn 61' c Con: Grayson (2/2) 45' 61'; Pen: Grayson (1/1) 37'; Cards: O'Conor (yellow card) 67'	Report	Try: Jaminet (2) 42' c, 65' c Tuicuvu 57' c Con: Jaminet (3/3) 43' 58' 66'; Pen: Jaminet (2/2) 3' 27'

Hive Stadium, Edinburgh
Attendance: 7,201
Referee: Ben Breakspear (Wales)

17 October 2026
16:00

Black Lion (Georgia (country))	14–39	(Wales) Ospreys (1 BP)
Try: Spenderashvili 19' c Giorgadze 77'c Con: Tsirekidze (2/2) 20' 78'	Report	Try: Evans 5' m Morse 11' m Sutton 24' m Morgan (2) 34' c 43' m Lloyd 49' m Hire 61' c Con: Creighton (2/7) 34' 62'

Avchala Rugby Stadium, Tbilisi
Attendance: 2,700
Referee: Benoit Rousselet (France)

18 October 2026
13:00

(1 BP) Harlequins (England)	57–19	(France) Vannes
Try: Murley (2) 7' c, 42' m Smith (2) 15' c, 60' m Hobson 31' c Riley 49' c Evans (2) 65' m, 76' c Staples 69' c Con: Smith (6/8) 8', 16', 32', 50', 70', 77'; Cards: Smith (yellow card) 36'	Report	Try: de Benedittis 21' c Benmegal (2) 37' c, 42' m Con: Cotarmanac'h (2/3) 21', 38'; Cards: Stegenhuis (yellow card) 76'

Twickenham Stoop, London
Attendance: 7,122
Referee: Peter Martin (Ireland)

=== Round 2 ===
12 December 2026
13:00

Ospreys (Wales)	v	(England) Harlequins

St Helen's, Swansea

12 December 2026
21:00

Toulon (France)	v	(Georgia (country)) Black Lion

Stade Mayol, Toulon

13 December 2026
14:00

Vannes (France)	v	(Scotland) Edinburgh

Stade de la Rabine, Vannes

=== Round 3 ===
9 January 2027
13:00

Edinburgh (Scotland)	v	(England) Harlequins

Hive Stadium, Edinburgh

9 January 2027
14:00

Toulon (France)	v	(Wales) Ospreys

Stade Mayol, Toulon

10 January 2027
14:00

Vannes (France)	v	(Georgia (country)) Black Lion

Stade de la Rabine, Vannes

=== Round 4 ===
15 January 2027
20:00

Harlequins (England)	v	(France) Toulon

Twickenham Stoop, London

16 January 2027
20:00

Ospreys (Wales)	v	(France) Vannes

St Helen's, Swansea

17 January 2027
17:00

Black Lion (Georgia (country))	v	(Scotland) Edinburgh

Avchala Rugby Stadium, Tbilisi
