= George Pearson (rugby union, born 2006) =

English rugby player (born 2006)

- Born: 25 January 2006 (age 20)
- Height: 1.90 m (6 ft 3 in)
- Weight: 93 kg (205 lb)
- School: City of Oxford College

Rugby union career
- Position(s): Winger, Full-back
- Current team: Leicester Tigers
Senior career
Years	Team	Apps	(Points)
2025-	Leicester Tigers	19	(40)
- Correct as of 16 November 2026
International career
Years	Team	Apps	(Points)
2025-2026	England U20	8	(10)

George Pearson (born 25 January 2006) is an English professional rugby union player for Leicester Tigers in Premiership Rugby. His preferred positions are wing or full-back.

== Early life ==
Pearson started playing rugby union at his local club Buckingham RFC and attended City of Oxford College.

== Club career ==
A product of the Leicester Tigers rugby academy, and comfortable anywhere across the back three, Pearson signed a professional contract with the club in December 2025. That month, he made his European Rugby Champions Cup debut for Leicester playing at fullback in a 39-20 defeat at Stade Rochelais, in which he made a scything run to set up a try for Joaquin Moro. The following month, he was a try scorer for Leicester in the Premiership Rugby Cup against Northampton Saints.

== International career ==
Having progressed from the England U18 side, Pearson made an impact on his England U20 debut by scoring a try in a win over Scotland U20 in the 2025 U20 Six Nations. That summer, he featured at the 2026 World Rugby Junior World Championship.

== Personal life ==
He is the brother of Coventry RFC and Germany international prop forward Henry Pearson.
