= Josh Bellamy (rugby union) =

English rugby union player

- Born: 14 March 2005 (age 21) Kingston-upon-Thames, England
- Height: 1.76 m (5 ft 9 in)
- Weight: 80 kg (176 lb; 12 st 8 lb)

Rugby union career
- Position(s): Fly-half, Fullback
- Current team: Harlequins
Senior career
Years	Team	Apps	(Points)
2025–	Harlequins		
2024–25	→ London Scottish (loan)		
International career
Years	Team	Apps	(Points)
2024–2025	England U20		

Josh Bellamy (born 14 March 2005) is an English professional rugby union footballer who plays for Harlequins.

== Club career ==
Born in Kingston-upon-Thames, Bellamy started rugby aged 4 years-old at Rosslyn Park F.C. prior to signing to Harlequins youth academy at the age of 13 years-old. Capable of playing at fly-half or full-back, Bellamy has played on loan at London Scottish as well as for Harlequins.

Bellamy signed a new professional contract with Harlequins in May 2025. He was a try-scorer for Harlequins in a 45-21 win the Premiership Rugby Cup against defending champions Leicester Tigers in September 2026.

== International career ==
Bellamy was included in the squad for the 2024 World Rugby U20 Championship and was a replacement in the final as England defeated France at Cape Town Stadium to become junior world champions. Bellamy continued with England U20 in 2025.
