= Aiden Ainsworth-Cave =

English rugby union player (born 2006)

- Born: 21 July 2006 (age 20)
- Height: 1.97 m (6 ft 6 in)
- Weight: 104 kg (16 st 5 lb; 229 lb)
- School: Bedford School
- University: University of Bath

Rugby union career
- Position: Lock
- Current team: Northampton Saints
Senior career
Years	Team	Apps	(Points)
2024-	Northampton Saints	2	(0)
2024-25	→ Bedford Blues (loan)	2	(0)
International career
Years	Team	Apps	(Points)
2024–	England U18s		
2025–	England U20s		

Aiden Ainsworth-Cave (born 21 July 2006) is an English professional rugby union footballer who plays for Northampton Saints and England U20s. His preferred position is Lock.

== Club career ==
Ainsworth-Cave was educated at Bedford School where he played first-XV rugby union, and signed his first senior contract with Northampton Saints in May 2024. He later studied at the University of Bath where he played British Universities and Colleges Sport (BUCS) Super Rugby.

He made his debut for Northampton as a replacement in the Premiership Rugby Cup against Harlequins on 1 November 2025.

== International career ==
A former England U18 player, Ainsworth-Cave made his England U20 debut against Ireland U20 in the U20 Six Nations Championship in February 2025. He also featured for England U19 in March 2025. That summer, he was a member of the England U20 squad at the 2025 World Rugby U20 Championship. He continued with the side at the 2026 U20 Six Nations in February 2026 and appeared at the 2026 World Rugby Junior World Championship.
