= Nathan Michelow =

English rugby union player (born 2004)

- Born: 16 May 2004 (age 22) Brentwood, Essex, England
- Height: 1.89 m (6 ft 2 in)
- Weight: 102 kg (16 st 1 lb; 225 lb)
- School: Coopers school Sutton Valence School

Rugby union career
- Position: Flanker
- Current team: Saracens
Senior career
Years	Team	Apps	(Points)
2022–	Saracens	23	(5)
2023–2024	→ Ampthill (loan)	12	(12)
- Correct as of 31 January 2025
International career
Years	Team	Apps	(Points)
2023–2024	England U20	13	(10)
- Correct as of 19 July 2024

Nathan Michelow (born 16 May 2004) is an English professional rugby union player who plays as a flanker for Ampthill on loan from Saracens.

== Early life ==
Michelow attended Coopers School in Upminster, Essex. He joined the academy at Saracens at the age of 14 years-old and then moved to Sutton Valence School for Sixth Form carrying on at Saracens and going to the Vase Final with his school.

== Club career ==
During the 2022-23 season at the age of 18 years-old Michelow made four Premiership Rugby Cup appearances in the back row for Saracens. He subsequently made his Premiership Rugby debut against Northampton Saints that season. He then started his first game in the league away at Bath Rugby in May 2023.

During the 2023-24 season Michelow played on loan for Ampthill RUFC in the Championship.

== International career ==
Michelow was part of the England U20 side which finished fourth at the 2023 Junior World Cup. He scored a try against Scotland during the 2024 Junior Six Nations and then started in the last round as England defeated France to win the tournament. Later that year he was included in the squad for the 2024 Junior World Cup however an injury sustained during their semi-final victory over Ireland ruled Michelow out of the final which England won to become junior world champions.

Michelow was selected for the England A squad in November 2025.

== Honours ==
England U20

- World Rugby Under 20 Championship
  - Champion (1): 2024
- Six Nations Under 20s Championship
  - Champion (1): 2024
