= Rob Carmichael =

Scottish rugby union player (born 2003)

- Born: 4 April 2003 (age 23) Hong Kong
- Height: 2.10 m (6 ft 11 in)
- Weight: 116 kg (18 st 4 lb)
- School: Trent College
- University: University of Nottingham

Rugby union career
- Position: Lock
- Current team: Edinburgh Rugby
Senior career
Years	Team	Apps	(Points)
2019–2024	Leicester Tigers	2	(0)
2024	→ Edinburgh Rugby (loan)	0	(0)
2024–	Edinburgh Rugby	3	(5)
International career
Years	Team	Apps	(Points)
2023	England U20		
2024	Emerging Scotland	1	(0)

Rob Carmichael (born 4 April 2003) is a professional rugby union footballer who plays as a Lock for Edinburgh Rugby.

Born in Hong Kong, he represents Scotland at international level.

He is believed to be the tallest player in rugby union.

== Early life ==
Born in Hong Kong to a Scottish father and an English/Welsh mother, he began playing rugby union as a youngster for Sandy Bay RFC in Hong Kong. He moved to the United Kingdom in 2019.

== Club career ==
He joined the academy at Leicester Tigers in 2019, making his debut for them in the Premiership Rugby Cup in the 2022-2023 season. In February 2024, he joined Edinburgh Rugby, initially on loan. The move later became permanent with the agreement of a three-year contract in the summer of 2024.

At 6ft 11in tall, he has been called "the tallest player in rugby union".

== International career ==
Eligible to play for England and Scotland, he played for England U20 at age-group level, making his debut against France U20 in 2023.

However, after signing for Edinburgh in 2024, he stated his desire to represent Scotland saying "My dad’s side of the family are all Scottish so I’ve supported them for as long as I can remember". In December 2024, he was called-up to the Emerging Scotland squad for their international match against Italy U23.

== Personal life ==
He attended Trent College in Long Eaton and later studied Sports Science at the University of Nottingham.
