= Hugh Shields (rugby union) =

English rugby union player

- Full name: Hugh Shields
- Born: 27 June 2008 (age 18)
- Height: 1.75 m (5 ft 9 in)
- Weight: 84 kg (185 lb)
- School: Northampton School for Boys
- Notable relative: Paul Shields (father)

Rugby union career
- Position: Fly half
Senior career
Years	Team	Apps	(Points)
2026–	Northampton Saints		
- Correct as of 10 September 2026
International career
Years	Team	Apps	(Points)
2025	England U18		
2026–	England U20		
- Correct as of 10 September 2026

Hugh Shields (born 27 June 2008) is an English professional rugby union footballer who plays as a fly-half for Northampton Saints, making his professional debut in 2026. He is an England U20 international.

== Biography ==
Born in Northampton, he played as a youngster for Old Northamptonians RFC. From a rugby family, his father Paul Shields was also a professional rugby union player who played for Northampton Saints. While a student at Northampton School for Boys, Shields played for England U18 as they won the Six Nations U18 Festival in 2025, also winning the Premiership Academy League with Northampton that year.

Although still eligible for England U18, he played for England U20 at the 2026 World Rugby Junior World Championship. His performances included scoring two tries and kicking 12 points in England's semi-final defeat to South Africa.

Shields was named for his Northampton Saints first-team debut in their season opener against Saracens in the Premiership Rugby Cup in September 2026.
