= Ollie Scola =

English rugby union player

- Born: 3 February 2006 (age 20)
- Height: 1.86 m (6 ft 1 in)
- Weight: 123 kg (271 lb; 19 st 5 lb)

Rugby union career
- Position: Prop
Senior career
Years	Team	Apps	(Points)
2025–	Northampton Saints		
2024–2025	Bedford Blues (loan)		
2024–2025	Cambridge (loan)		
International career
Years	Team	Apps	(Points)
2026-	England U20		

Oliver Scola (born 3 February 2006) is an English professional rugby union footballer who plays as a prop forward for Northampton Saints.

== Club career ==
A loose-head prop, Scola joined the youth set-up at Northampton Saints at the age of 14 years-old and progressed through the youth academy at Franklin's Gardens despite a serious knee injury at under-18 level, and signed a full-time contract with the club in the 2024-25 season. That season, he spent time on loan at Bedford Blues and Cambridge RUFC.

He made his Northampton debut in the Premiership Rugby Cup against Harlequins in November 2025. He subsequently made his league debut in a win at Bath Rugby the following month. Having played six times for the senior side he signed a new professional contract with the club the following year.

== International career ==
Scola played for England national under-20 rugby union team at the 2026 U20 Six Nations Championship. That summer, Scola appeared for England U20 at the 2026 World Rugby Junior World Championship.
