= Will Knight (rugby union) =

English rugby union player

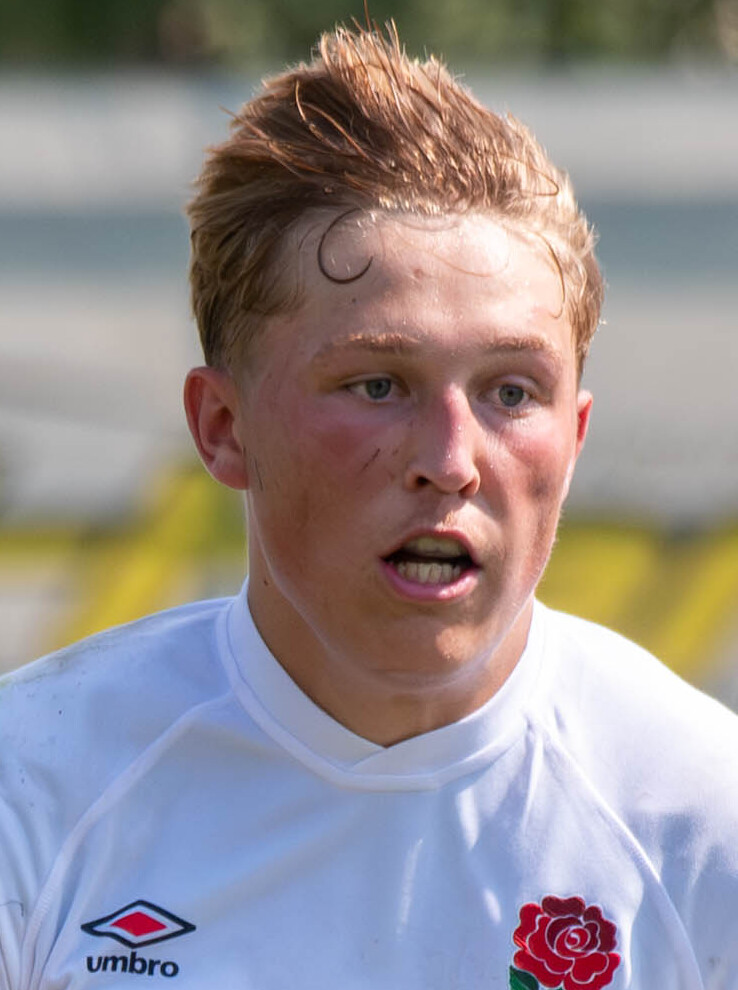
- Knight in 2025
- Born: 3 April 2007 (age 19) Gloucester
- Height: 1.91 m (6 ft 3 in)
- Weight: 93 kg (14 st 9 lb; 205 lb)
- School: St Peter’s RC High School, Gloucester Hartpury College

Rugby union career
- Position: Centre
- Current team: Gloucester
Youth career
- -: Matson RFC Longlevens RFC
Senior career
Years	Team	Apps	(Points)
2025–	Gloucester	7	(15)
International career
Years	Team	Apps	(Points)
2025-	England U18	4	(15)
2025-	England U20	4	(10)

Will Knight (born 3 April 2007) is an English professional rugby union footballer who plays at centre for Premiership Rugby club Gloucester.

== Club career ==
Born in Gloucester, Will attended St Peter’s RC High School, Gloucester playing 1st XV before moving down the road to Hartpury College, he has also played for Matson RFC in his early youth years & progressing to Longlevens RFC in his latter secondary school years, he also has a brother named Max who plays for Gloucester Rugby too. Ahead of the 2025-26 season he was promoted from the academy to the Gloucester Rugby Senior Academy squad.

He made his senior debut for Gloucester against Bristol Bears in the Premiership Rugby Cup in September 2025, starting in the centre alongside his brother Max. He scored a try on debut inside three minutes, with Max also getting on the score sheet in a 40-24 loss.

== International career ==
A former England U18 player, he made his debut for England U20 as an eighteen year-old against Scotland U20 in 2025. He featured in the England team at the 2025 World Rugby U20 Championship. The following year, he also played for England at the 2026 World Rugby Junior World Championship.

In November 2026, he was included in the England A squad to play against an Argentina XV in Bath.
