= Harry Taylor (rugby union) =

English rugby union player

- Born: Harry Taylor; 9 September 2001 (age 25) Bristol, England
- Height: 1.90 m (6 ft 3 in)
- Weight: 108 kg (17 st 0 lb)
- School: Clifton College

Rugby union career
- Position: Flanker
- Current team: Gloucester
Senior career
Years	Team	Apps	(Points)
2021–	Gloucester	14	(0)
2024	→ Dragons	1	(0)
- Correct as of 25 July 2024
International career
Years	Team	Apps	(Points)
2017–2018	England U18s		
2018–2020	England U20s		
- Correct as of 25 July 2024

Harry Taylor (born 9 September 2001) is an English rugby union player who competes for Gloucester in the Premiership Rugby.

Taylor was a former co-captain of the Gloucester developmental side, signed a professional deal at Gloucester after completing his studies at Clifton College. He was included in the England U20s squad for the 2021 Six Nations Under 20s Championship.

Hillman-Cooper made his first-team debut for Gloucester against Exeter Chiefs in the Premiership Rugby Cup back in November 2021. In March 2024, Taylor signed a short-term loan with Welsh region Dragons for a United Rugby Championship fixture against Ulster.
