= Will Evans (rugby union, born 2006) =

Welsh rugby union player

- Born: 2 January 2006 (age 20) Ottershaw, England
- Height: 198 cm (6 ft 6 in)
- Weight: 120 kg (265 lb)
- School: Llandovery College

Rugby union career
- Position: Lock
- Current team: Scarlets
Youth career
- Chobham RFC
Senior career
Years	Team	Apps	(Points)
2024–	Llandovery	7	(0)
2026–	Scarlets	4	
International career
Years	Team	Apps	(Points)
2026	Wales U20	4	(0)

Will Evans (born 2 January 2006) is a Welsh rugby union player who plays for the Scarlets as a lock.

== Early life ==
Evans played for Chobham RFC in Surrey, before joining the Welsh Exiles rugby programme. After moving to Wales, he attended Llandovery College. Although born in England, Evans qualifies for Wales through his father, who is from St Asaph.

== Club career ==
=== Llandovery ===
Evans made his debut for Llandovery RFC on 13 September 2024, and was named player of the match in the fixture.

He missed a significant portion of the 2025–26 season due to various injuries, including multiple hamstring injuries.

=== Scarlets ===
Evans featured for the Scarlets U18, but missed the 2024 Regional Age Grade competition due to injury. He signed an academy contract in 2024, followed by a first senior contract ahead of the 2026–27 United Rugby Championship. He made his competitive debut in the season opener on 26 September 2026, against Cardiff.

== International career ==
=== Wales U18 and U20 ===
Evans was part of the Wales U18 development squad in 2023. In 2024, Evans was named in the Wales U18 squad for the U18 Six Nations festival.

Evans was named in the Wales U20 squad for the 2026 World Rugby Junior World Championship. He made his debut on 27 June 2026 on the win over Georgia U20.
