= Jonny Weimann =

English rugby union player (born 2006)

- Born: 28 March 2006 (age 20)
- Height: 1.82 m (6 ft 0 in)
- Weight: 83 kg (13 st 1 lb; 183 lb)
- School: Bedford School

Rugby union career
- Position: Scrum-half
- Current team: Northampton Saints
Senior career
Years	Team	Apps	(Points)
2024–	Northampton Saints	14	(5)
2024–25	→ Bedford Blues (loan)	6	(5)
- Correct as of 19 January 2026
International career
Years	Team	Apps	(Points)
2024–	England U18s		
2025–	England U20s		

Jonny Weimann (born 28 March 2006) is an English professional rugby union footballer who plays as a scrum half for Premiership Rugby club Northampton Saints.

== Early life ==
He was educated at Bedford School and started playing rugby union when he was four years-old for Royston Rugby Club. He was a youth player at Saracens prior to his release when he was 16 years-old, after which he joined the rugby academy at Northampton Saints.

== Club career ==
He made his senior debut for Northampton Saints against Sale Sharks in March 2024, and signed his first senior contract with the club in May of that year, ahead of the start of the 2024-25 season.

He played on loan at RFU Championship side Bedford Blues in 2024. He went on to make four Premiership appearances during the 2024-25 season for Northampton and made his first Premiership Rugby start in May 2025, in a 42-14 defeat away against Exeter Chiefs.

== International career ==
He played for England Under-18s in the Six Nations Festival in March 2024.

He made his debut for the England national under-20 rugby union team as a replacement against Scotland U20 in the U20 Six Nations in February 2025. In June 2025, he was named in the England U20 squad for the 2025 World Rugby U20 Championship. The following year, he also appeared at the 2026 World Rugby Junior World Championship.
