= Tyler Offiah =

English rugby union player (born 2006)

- Born: 29 June 2006 (age 20)
- Height: 1.91 m (6 ft 3 in)
- School: Wellington College, Berkshire
- University: University of Bath
- Notable relative: Martin Offiah (father)

Rugby union career
- Position: Wing
- Current team: Bath
Senior career
Years	Team	Apps	(Points)
2024–	Bath	7	(20)
- Correct as of 11 June 2026
International career
Years	Team	Apps	(Points)
2024	England U18	3	(10)
2024–	England U20	7	(5)
- Correct as of 11 June 2026

Tyler Offiah (born 29 June 2006) is an English rugby union player who plays for Bath Rugby. He is the son of Martin Offiah.

== Early life ==
Offiah joined Ealing Trailfinders aged five years-old and attended St Benedict's School, Ealing. He was part of the London Irish academy and became part of the London and South Central academy, funded by the Rugby Football Union. He completed his A-Levels at Wellington College, Berkshire and received an offer from the University of Bath to study Politics and International Relations. A multi-sport athlete, he also played American football for London Blitz as a wide receiver and rugby league for Richmond Warriors. He has also worked as a model for the Sandra Reynolds Model Agency in London. He later studied at the University of Bath, where he played British Universities and Colleges Sport (BUCS) Super Rugby.

== Club career ==
Offiah trained with rugby league side Wigan Warriors without signing a professional contract. He signed a professional contract with Bath Rugby ahead of the 2024/25 season. Reportedly, Offiah also had offers from Wigan Warriors, Gloucester Rugby, Sale Sharks and Leicester Tigers. Upon his signing, Bath head of rugby Johann van Graan said "What impresses me about Tyler is his speed, spatial awareness, finishing ability and a natural understanding of playing the game".

He scored his first try for Bath in a 78-19 Premiership Rugby Cup victory over Bristol Bears in November 2024. He made his first competitive start in the quarterfinal victory of that competition against Newcastle Falcons on 28 February 2025. He scored a try within ten minutes of his league debut for Bath against Saracens in May 2025.

== International career ==
He made his England U18 debut in April 2024 at the U18 Six Nations Rugby Festival in Italy. He was called-up to train with England U20 in September 2024. In June 2025, he was named in the England U20 squad for the 2025 World Rugby U20 Championship. The following year, he also appeared for England U20 at the 2026 World Rugby Junior World Championship.

== Style of play ==
At 6 ft 3", he is taller than his father, although he also plays on the wing. He has been described as having "exceptional speed, strength, and scoring prowess.” England U18 head coach Jonathan Pendlebury compared him to his father speaking to RugbyPass saying "They [both] like scoring tries…he [Tyler] likes playing rugby with a smile on his face."

== Personal life ==
The son of former cross-code rugby international Martin Offiah and his wife Virginia, he has stated that he is a fan of Brisbane Broncos. His cousin Odeluga Offiah is a professional footballer. He has Nigerian heritage through his paternal grandparents.
