= Nick Lilley =

English rugby union player (born 2006)

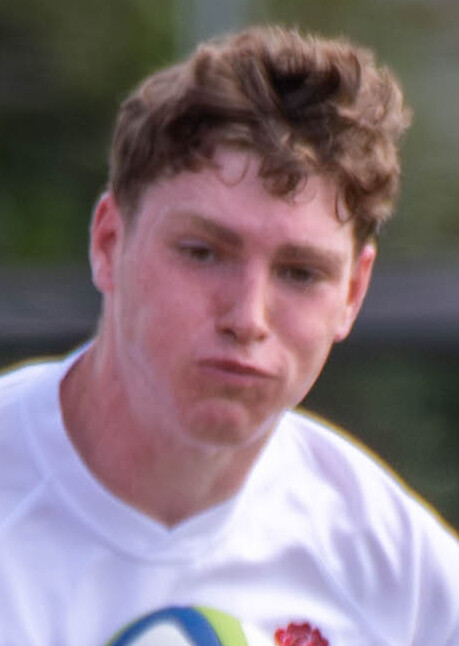
- Lilley in 2025
- Born: 21 March 2006 (age 20)
- Height: 1.86 m (6 ft 1 in)
- Weight: 96 kg (15 st 2 lb; 212 lb)
- School: Exeter College
- University: University of Exeter

Rugby union career
- Position: Centre
- Current team: Exeter Chiefs
Senior career
Years	Team	Apps	(Points)
2025-	Exeter Chiefs		
International career
Years	Team	Apps	(Points)
2024	England U18s		
2025–	England U20s		

Nick Lilley (born 21 March 2006) is an English professional rugby union footballer plays as a centre for Premiership Rugby club Exeter Chiefs.

== Early life ==
From Devon, he played as a youngster at Ivybridge RFC, following a similar route to future teammate and England international Henry Slade. Lilley attended Exeter University for whom he played British Universities and Colleges Sport (BUCS) Rugby.

== Club career ==
He signed an academy contract with Exeter Chiefs in October 2024. He was a try-scorer on his Premiership Rugby debut for Exeter in a 42-14 home win against Northampton Saints in May 2025.

== International career ==
He played for England U18s in 2024. He made his first start for the England national under-20 rugby union team against Scotland U20 in the U20 Six Nations in February 2025. In June 2025, he was named in the England U20 squad for the 2025 World Rugby U20 Championship. The following year, he also appeared at the 2026 World Rugby Junior World Championship.
