= Sam Winters =

English rugby union player (born 2006)

- Born: 28 November 2006 (age 19)
- Height: 1.83 m (6 ft 0 in)
- Weight: 90 kg (198 lb)
- School: Harrow School
- University: University of Bath

Rugby union career
- Position(s): Wing; Full-back
- Current team: Bath
Senior career
| Years | Team | Apps | (Points) |
| 2025– | Bath | | |
- Correct as of 11 June 2026
International career
| Years | Team | Apps | (Points) |
| 2025 | England U18 | | |
| 2026– | England U20 | | |
- Correct as of 11 June 2026

Sam Winters (born 28 November 2006) is an English professional rugby union footballer who plays for Bath Rugby at full-back or wing.

== Club career ==
From Crazies Hill, Berkshire, Winters is a former Henley Rugby Club player and student at Harrow School, with whom he won the Daily Mail Schools Trophy and Continental Tyres National Schools Cup. Winters was in the youth academy at London Irish prior to joining Bath. He signed his first professional contract with the Bath Academy in November 2024, prior to combining his rugby with studying at the University of Bath.

Winters made his competitive debut for Bath in the 2025-26 season in the Premiership Rugby Cup against local rivals Bristol Bears. That season, Winters made his league debut in PREM Rugby for Bath in an away fixture against Northampton Saints on 25 April 2026, appearing as a second-half replacement.

== International career ==
Formerly an England U18 and England U19 international, Winters played for England U20 at the 2026 World Rugby Junior World Championship where the team reached the semi-finals.
