= Josiah Edwards-Giraud =

English rugby union player

- Born: Josiah Edwards-Giraud; 25 December 2002 (age 23) Bicester, England
- Height: 1.83 m (6 ft 0 in)
- Weight: 92 kg (14 st 7 lb; 203 lb)
- School: Hartpury College
- University: Hartpury University

Rugby union career
- Position: Wing
- Current team: Gloucester
Senior career
Years	Team	Apps	(Points)
2024–2025	Hartpury University	24	(10)
2025–	Gloucester	17	(10)

Josiah Edwards-Giraud (born 25 December 2002) is an English professional rugby union footballer who plays as a winger for Premiership Rugby club Gloucester.

== Career ==
Born in Bicester, he started playing rugby union at the age of five years-old. He was educated at Glory Farm Primary School and Cooper School, Bicester before studying studying Sports Business Management at Hartpury University. He played rugby for Bicester RUFC and Oxford Harlequins, before joining the rugby academy of Wasps, and then Gloucester Rugby. While studying at Hartpury University, Josiah got into their Champ Rugby team for that season, playing 24 games for the first team, scoring 10 points, in a season where they finished 6th.

He made his debut for Gloucester in the Premiership Rugby Cup against Exeter Chiefs on 12 September 2025, scoring a try in a 29-15 victory for his side. He was named as a replacement for Gloucester's Rugby Premiership match against Sale Sharks on 25 September 2025, before making his debut as a replacement the following weekend in a 35-37 defeat to Northampton Saints. He scored his first league try for Gloucester the following month on 17 October against Bristol Bears.
