= Jimmy Staples =

English rugby union player (born 2006)

- Born: 20 July 2006 (age 20)
- Height: 1.83 m (6 ft 0 in)
- Weight: 105 kg (16 st 7 lb; 231 lb)
- School: Seaford College

Rugby union career
- Position: Hooker
- Current team: Harlequins
Senior career
Years	Team	Apps	(Points)
2024–	Harlequins		
2024–2026	→ London Scottish (loan)		
2025–2026	→ Tonbridge Juddians (loan)		
International career
Years	Team	Apps	(Points)
2024	England U18		
2025–2026	England U20		

Jimmy Staples (born 20 July 2006) is an English professional rugby union player who plays as a hooker for Prem Rugby club Harlequins.

== Early life ==
Staples was educated at Seaford College and played club rugby for Chaddesley Corbett RFC and Worthing RFC, although he had started off playing football prior to his local club being disbanded after which he focused on rugby union, initially playing touch rugby.

== Club career ==
Playing at hooker, Staples captained Harlequins U18 side in 2024, and was given a Senior Academy contract at the club at the end of that season. He made his senior Harlequins debut off the bench away at London Scottish in November 2024 in the Premiership Rugby Cup.

During the 2025-26 season, Staples made six appearances for the Harlequins first-team, including a try-scoring debut in the Rugby Premiership against Newcastle Red Bulls he also played on-loan at Champ Rugby club London Scottish and with Tonbridge Juddians in National League One, where he was worked under coach Jordan Turner-Hall.

Staples was named as a replacement for Harlequins match in the EPCR Challenge Cup match against RC Vannes on 17 October 2026 for his debut in a match-day squad in European Rugby, and was a second-half try-scorer in a 57-19 victory.

== International career ==
A England U18 international, Staples was part of the England U20 squad for the 2026 U20 Six Nations Championship and 2026 World Rugby U20 Championship; scoring tries against Ireland in their opening game and also later against Argentina, as England reached the semi-finals.
