= Cameron Anderson (rugby union) =

Scottish rugby union player

- Full name: Cameron Anderson
- Born: 16 September 1999 (age 27) Aylesbury, England
- Height: 187 cm (6 ft 2 in)
- Weight: 93 kg (205 lb; 14 st 9 lb)

Rugby union career
- Position: Utility Back
- Current team: Harlequins
Youth career
- 2018-2021: Wasps
Senior career
Years	Team	Apps	(Points)
2018-2022	Wasps	6	(0)
2018-2019	Wasps A	10	(0)
2018-2019	→ Loughborough Students (loan)	5	(0)
2019-2021	→ Ampthill (loan)	9	(0)
2021	→ Hartpury University (loan)	1	(0)
2022-2023	London Scottish	23	(15)
2022	→ Harlequins (loan)	1	(5)
2023—	Harlequins	5	(10)
2023—	→ London Scottish (loan)	10	(0)
- Correct as of 21 March 2024
International career
Years	Team	Apps	(Points)
2019	Scotland under-20	9	(10)
- Correct as of 21 March 2024

Cameron Anderson (born 16 September 1999) is an English-born Scottish rugby union player who plays for Harlequins, as well as featuring London Scottish on loan.

== Club career ==
He began his career at Wasps, featuring 10 times for the side in the 2018-19 Premiership Rugby Shield. Making his full debut for Wasps in the 2017-18 Anglo-Welsh Cup, Anderson coming off the bench in a 66–7 loss against London Irish. He elevated to the senior squad in 2021. In the 2018-19 he joined Loughborough Students RUFC on loan in National League 1. He spent the next two seasons on loan at RFU Championship side Ampthill. As well as making a solitary appearance for Hartpury University in 2021.

He joined London Scottish in 2022 making his debut against Hartpury University. He played on loan for Harlequins in the Premiership Rugby Cup, scoring a try. He fully signed to Harlequins in 2023 as part of a strategic partnership with London Scottish he played on loan for the club.

== International career ==
He played for Scotland under-20 in the 2019 U20 Six Nations and 2019 U20 World Championship.
