= Caio James =

Welsh rugby union player (born 2006)

- Born: 17 April 2006 (age 20)
- Height: 1.76 m (5 ft 9 in)
- Weight: 92 kg (14 st 7 lb; 203 lb)

Rugby union career
- Position: Flanker
- Current team: Gloucester
Senior career
Years	Team	Apps	(Points)
2024–	Gloucester	12	(10)
International career
Years	Team	Apps	(Points)
2025-	Wales U20	16	(25)

Caio James (born 17 April 2006) is a Welsh professional rugby union footballer who plays as a back row forward for Premiership Rugby side Gloucester.

== Early life ==
He is from Llandysul before later studying at Hartpury College. A keen soccer player in his youth, he was a member of the Swansea City academy before opting to focus on rugby union, and represented Wales at youth level.

== Club career ==
After joining Gloucester Rugby, he captained the under-18 side during the 2023-24 season before stepping up to the Gloucester Senior Academy in 2024. He made his professional debut the Premiership Rugby Cup that year as an 18 year-old, before making further appearances in the competition during the 2024-25 season.

Continuing with the team, he received a yellow card at the start of 2025-26 season against Bristol Bears in the Premiership Rugby Cup after grappling with compatriot Louis Rees-Zammit. He went on to score two tries for Gloucester in a 29-28 away win over Sale Sharks on 2 November in the competition.

== International career ==
He played for Wales U18 in 2024. He featured for Wales U20 at the 2025 World Rugby U20 Championship.
