= Jimmy Halliwell =

English rugby union player

- Born: 31 March 2004 (age 22) Bristol, England
- Height: 193 cm (6 ft 4 in)
- Weight: 129 kg (284 lb; 20 st 4 lb)

Rugby union career
- Position: Tight-head Prop
- Current team: Bristol Bears
Youth career
- Bristol Bears
Senior career
Years	Team	Apps	(Points)
2022–	Bristol Bears	29	(5)
2022–2023	→ Old Redcliffians (loan)	12	(0)
2023–2024	→ Dings Crusaders RFC (loan)	13	(0)
- Correct as of 10 October 2026
International career
Years	Team	Apps	(Points)
2022	England U18	4	(0)
2023–2024	England U20	13	(10)
- Correct as of 19 July 2026

Jimmy Halliwell (born 31 March 2004) is an English professional rugby union player who plays as a prop for PREM Rugby club Bristol Bears.

== Club career ==
From Bristol, Halliwell played rugby at Thornbury Rugby Club. He came through the Academy at Bristol Bears and plays as a tighthead prop, and was a member of the club's title-winning U18 side in 2021. He first signed a professional contract with the club in 2022. He played on loan at Dings Crusaders in the 2023-24 season, helping the club achieve promotion from National League 2 West, and also featured on loan for Old Redcliffians as a youth player.

Halliwell made his debut for Bristol Bears in the PREM Rugby and also featured in the European Rugby Champions Cup during the 2024-25 season. He signed a new long-term contract with the club in August 2026 having made 25 appearances for the club in all competitions.

== International career ==
Halliwell represented England U18 at the 2022 Six Nations Festival. The following year he was part of the England U20 squad that finished fourth at the 2023 World Rugby U20 Championship.

Halliwell scored a try in the last round of the 2024 Six Nations Under 20s Championship which saw England defeat France U20 to win the tournament. Later that year he scored another try during the pool stage of the 2024 World Rugby U20 Championship against Fiji. He came off the bench in the final as a substitute replacement for Afolabi Fasogbon as England beat France at Cape Town Stadium to become junior world champions.

== Honours ==
England U20

- World Rugby Junior World Championship
  - (gold) Champion (1): 2024
- Six Nations Under 20s Championship
  - (gold) Champion (1): 2024
