= Luke Davidson =

English rugby union player (born 2006)

- Full name: Luke Davidson
- Born: 19 June 2006 (age 20)
- Height: 188 cm (6 ft 2 in)
- Weight: 77 kg (170 lb; 12 st 2 lb)
- School: Michaelhouse

Rugby union career
- Position: Fly-half / Outside Back
- Current team: Saracens
Youth career
- 2024: Sharks U18
Senior career
Years	Team	Apps	(Points)
2025–	Ampthill RUFC	12	(85)
2025–	Saracens	6	(5)
- Correct as of 19 May 2026
International career
Years	Team	Apps	(Points)
2026–	England U20	1	(2)
- Correct as of 24 February 2026

Luke Davidson (born 19 June 2006) is an England rugby union player. Born and educated in KwaZulu-Natal, South Africa, Davidson developed his rugby at Michaelhouse, before moving to England to join the Saracens academy system. He has represented England U20 at age-grade international level.

== Early life and education ==
Davidson was born and raised in KwaZulu-Natal, South Africa, and attended Michaelhouse, a well-established boarding school in KwaZulu-Natal with a strong rugby tradition. He played for the school’s first team as fly-half and was recognised for his game management and goal-kicking ability during major inter-school fixtures. In 2023, Davidson, along with Campbell Ridl and Wandile Mlaba, was part of the famous Michaelhouse side that won the International U18's Sevens Tournament in the UK.

In his final year at Michaelhouse, Davidson was selected to represent the KwaZulu-Natal Sharks at the Craven Week Under-18 tournament in 2024, South Africa’s premier schools rugby competition. During the tournament he impressed with his goal-kicking, notably scoring 16 points against WP U18.

== Rugby career ==
=== Club career ===
After completing his schooling in South Africa, Davidson moved to England in 2024 to join the Saracens academy, with independent media reporting Saracens had won a competitive recruitment race to sign him from the South African schools system.

In February 2025, Davidson was named on the bench for Saracens in a Premiership Rugby Cup fixture against London Scottish, marking his involvement in the senior matchday squad.

To gain senior experience, Davidson was dual-registered with Ampthill in the RFU Championship during the 2024–25 season. He made his debut for Ampthill on 24 May 2025 against Cambridge, converting seven kicks in a 54–43 victory.

=== International career ===
Davidson’s performances in England led to his selection for the England U20 squad during the 2026 Six Nations Under 20s Championship. He was named as the starting fly-half for England’s opening match against Wales U20.

In the match, Davidson scored a conversion for England, earning his first U20 cap and international points.

== Playing style ==
Davidson is primarily a fly-half known for his tactical kicking, composure and game management. He has been described by rugby analysts as a highly-rated young playmaker, earning positive reviews for his performances at schools level and during the Craven Week tournament.

== Personal life ==
Davidson is the son of Brett Davidson, who represented KwaZulu-Natal at schools level and attended Craven Week in 1990. Although raised in South Africa, Davidson qualifies for England and has pursued his international career through the English age-grade pathway.
