= Ollie Streeter =

English rugby union player (born 2006)

- Born: 1 July 2006 (age 20)
- Height: 1.91 m (6 ft 3 in)
- Weight: 121 kg (19 st 1 lb; 267 lb)
- School: Gordon's School

Rugby union career
- Position: Prop
- Current team: Harlequins
Senior career
Years	Team	Apps	(Points)
2025-	Harlequins		
International career
Years	Team	Apps	(Points)
2024	England U18		
2025–	England U20		

Ollie Streeter (born 1st July 2006) is an English professional rugby union footballer who plays as a prop forward for PREM Rugby club Harlequins.

== Early life ==
Educated at Oathall Community College, before attending Gordon's School, where he earned a rugby scholarship. Streeter came to rugby union relatively late, taking up the sport when he was 13 years-old and playing locally in Haywards Heath. He joined the rugby academy at Harlequins after a recommendation from his school PE Teacher. He initially played as a back row forward before later transitioning to the front row.

== Club career ==
After progressing through the academy at Harlequins he made his Premiership Rugby debut against Gloucester Rugby in 2025 at Twickenham. Following his debut, he went on to also play for Harlequins in the next two consecutive rounds off the bench against Exeter and Bristol.

== International career ==
He was selected for England U18 to compete in April 2024 at the U18 Six Nations Rugby Festival in Italy.

He played for the England national under-20 rugby union team at the 2025 World Rugby U20 Championship, receiving a red card during the fifth-place play-off match against Wales U20 in July 2025. He continued with the side in the 2026 U20 Six Nations in February 2026 and the 2026 World Rugby Junior World Championship.
