= Will Hobson (rugby union) =

English rugby union player (born 2002)

- Born: 9 November 2002 (age 24) Norwich, England
- Height: 1.93 m (6 ft 4 in)
- Weight: 127 kg (20 st 0 lb; 280 lb)
- School: Wellington College

Rugby union career
- Position: Prop
- Current team: Harlequins
Senior career
Years	Team	Apps	(Points)
2021–	Harlequins	37	(10)
- Correct as of 16 May 2026
International career
Years	Team	Apps	(Points)
2022	England U20	3	(5)
- Correct as of 9 November 2025

Will Hobson (born 9 November 2002) is an English professional rugby union player who plays for Premiership club Harlequins. His main position is prop.

== Early life ==
Hobson played junior rugby union in Norfolk for Wymondham Rugby Club, and attended Wellington College.

== Club career ==
Hobson joined the youth set-up at Harlequins at the age of 14 years-old. He made his senior debut for Harlequins in November 2021 against Northampton Saints.

During the 2025-26 season Hobson featured for Harlequins in the European Rugby Champions Cup. He suffered a bite from opponent Nathan Jibulu of Sale Sharks during their last-16 match in the competition. That season, Hobson signed a contract extension with the club.

== International career ==
Hobson played in the front row alongside Harlequins teammate Fin Baxter for England U20 during the 2022 Six Nations Under 20s Championship and scored a try against Wales. In January 2026, he was called-up as part of the England A squad.
