= Lucas Andjisseramatchi =

French rugby player

- Born: 12 April 2006 (age 20)
- Height: 1.87 m (6 ft 2 in)
- Weight: 105 kg (231 lb)

Rugby union career
- Position(s): Flanker; Number 8
- Current team: Stade Rochelais
Senior career
Years	Team	Apps	(Points)
2024-	Stade Rochelais		
International career
Years	Team	Apps	(Points)
2026-	France U20		

Lucas Andjisseramatchi (born 12 April 2006) is a French professional rugby union footballer who plays for Stade Rochelais. His preferred positions are flanker and number 8.

== Club career ==
Andjiseramatchi began playing rugby union at Rugby Club Massy Essonne, where he played for almost a decade prior too joining Stade Rochelais as a youth team member in the summer of 2024.

During the 2025-26 season, he captained Stade Rochelais in the European Rugby Champions Cup match against the Stormers, becoming the youngest captain in the club's history at the age of 19 years-old. In May 2026, he extended his contract with the club until 2028.

== International career ==
He was selected for the France national under-20 rugby union team for the 2026 Six Nations Under 20s Championship, winning the grand slam with the team, the first for his country in the tournament since 2014. That summer, he captained France U20 to the 2026 World Rugby U20 Championship final.
