= John Dalziel =

Scottish rugby union player & coach

- University: Edinburgh Napier University

Rugby union career
- Position: Flanker
Amateur team(s)
Years	Team	Apps	(Points)
1996-2002	Gala		
2007-13	Melrose		
1999-2009	South of Scotland		
2010	→Co-Optimists		
Senior career
Years	Team	Apps	(Points)
1997-98	London Scottish		
2001–07	Border Reivers	95	
International career
Years	Team	Apps	(Points)
-	Scotland Club XV	6	
–	Barbarians FC	4	
–	Scotland Sevens		
Coaching career
- Years: Team
- 2005-13: Melrose (Forwards coach)
- 2013-16: Melrose (Head coach)
- 2012-15: Scotland U20s (Assistant coach)
- 2015–17: Scotland U20s(Head coach)
- 2016-17: London Scottish (Forwards)
- 2017–19: Scotland 7s (Head coach)
- 2019-20: Glasgow Warriors (Forwards)
- 2020-: Scotland (Forwards)

John Dalziel is a Forwards Coach for Scotland. He was previously Head Coach of the Scotland 7s team. He began coaching while at Melrose, and went on have coaching roles with Scotland U20, London Scottish and Glasgow Warriors.

As a player he represented London Scottish, Gala, Border Reivers and Melrose.

== Playing career ==
He played club rugby for Gala RFC as a back-row forward and captained the club. He moved to play for Melrose in 2008. He played for the Co-Optimists in 2010.

Dalziel played for London Scottish for the 1997–98 season.

He played for the Border Reivers in the Celtic league and signed a professional contract with the club in 2001.

== Coaching career ==
Dalziel played for Melrose RFC and also became their Forwards coach. He was promoted to Head Coach for the 2013–14 season. Melrose won the league title in the final seconds of the season.

In September 2012 he was appointed as assistant coach for the Scotland national under-20 rugby union team. In September 2015 he was promoted to head coach of the Scotland national under-20 rugby union team.

The following year he left Melrose and took on a full-time coaching role with Scottish Rugby. He was appointed as the Forwards coach of London Scottish F.C. for the 2016–17 season, who were competing in the RFU Championship. He did this on sabbatical while still Head Coach of the Scotland U20s.

The following season he was as appointed the Head Coach for Scotland 7s.

On 3 May 2019 it was announced that Dalziel would be joining Glasgow Warriors as Forwards Coach with immediate effect, leaving his role with the Scotland 7s team.

On 3 August 2020 it was announced by Glasgow Warriors that Dalziel was moving on to become the Forwards Coach for Scotland.

== Personal life ==
His son Jake Dalziel is also a professional rugby union player.
