= Max Knight (rugby union) =

English rugby union player

- Born: 12 February 2004 (age 22) Gloucester
- Height: 1.87 m (6 ft 2 in)
- Weight: 85 kg (13 st 5 lb; 187 lb)
- University: Hartpury University

Rugby union career
- Position: Centre
- Current team: Gloucester
Senior career
Years	Team	Apps	(Points)
2025-2025	Hartpury		
2024–	Gloucester		

Max Knight (born 12 December 2004) is an English professional rugby union footballer who plays at centre for Premiership Rugby club Gloucester.

== Career ==
He played British Universities and Colleges Sport (BUCS) rugby for Hartpury University as well as in the Rigby Championship. He played for Hartpury and Gloucester Rugby during the 2024-25 season, scoring a try in the Premiership Rugby Cup for Gloucester against Cornish Pirates in November 2024.

He started for Gloucester against Bristol Bears in the Premiership Rugby Cup in September 2025, starting in the centre alongside his brother Will. Both brothers scored in a 40-24 loss.

== Personal life ==
He attended St Peter’s RC High School, Gloucester & Hartpury College - his brother Will Knight also plays for Gloucester Rugby.
