= Connor Treacey =

English rugby union player

- Born: 5 March 2006 (age 20)
- Height: 1.89 m (6 ft 2 in)
- Weight: 103 kg (227 lb)
- School: Beechen Cliff School
- University: University of Bath

Rugby union career
- Position: Flanker
- Current team: Bath
Senior career
Years	Team	Apps	(Points)
2025-	Bath		
International career
Years	Team	Apps	(Points)
2023–2024	England U18		
2025-	England U20		

Connor Treacey (born 5 March 2006) is an English rugby union player who plays for Bath Rugby. His preferred position is flanker. He captained England U20 in 2026.

== Early life ==
Treacey played rugby union as a youngster for New Milton Rugby Club having started in the sport at the age of five years-old. He attended Beechen Cliff School in Bath, England, before playing British Universities and Colleges Sport (BUCS) rugby with the University of Bath.

== Club career ==
He joined the Bath Rugby Academy at under-15 level. With the club, he won the English U18 league in 2024. He signed a professional contract with Bath ahead of the 2024-25 season. He made his debut in the Premiership Rugby Cup against Gloucester Rugby on 15 November 2025.

== International career ==
He played for England U18 from 2023, and captained the side to an U18 Six Nations Championship Grand Slam in 2024. In June 2025, he was named in the England U20 squad for the 2025 World Rugby U20 Championship. He captained the side against Wales U20 in the 2026 U20 Six Nations on 6 February 2026, and at the 2026 World Rugby Junior World Championship as they lost in the semi-finals to South Africa U20.

== Personal life ==
His younger brother Declan is also a rugby player who has captained England at under-18 level.
