= Nathan Jibulu =

English rugby union player

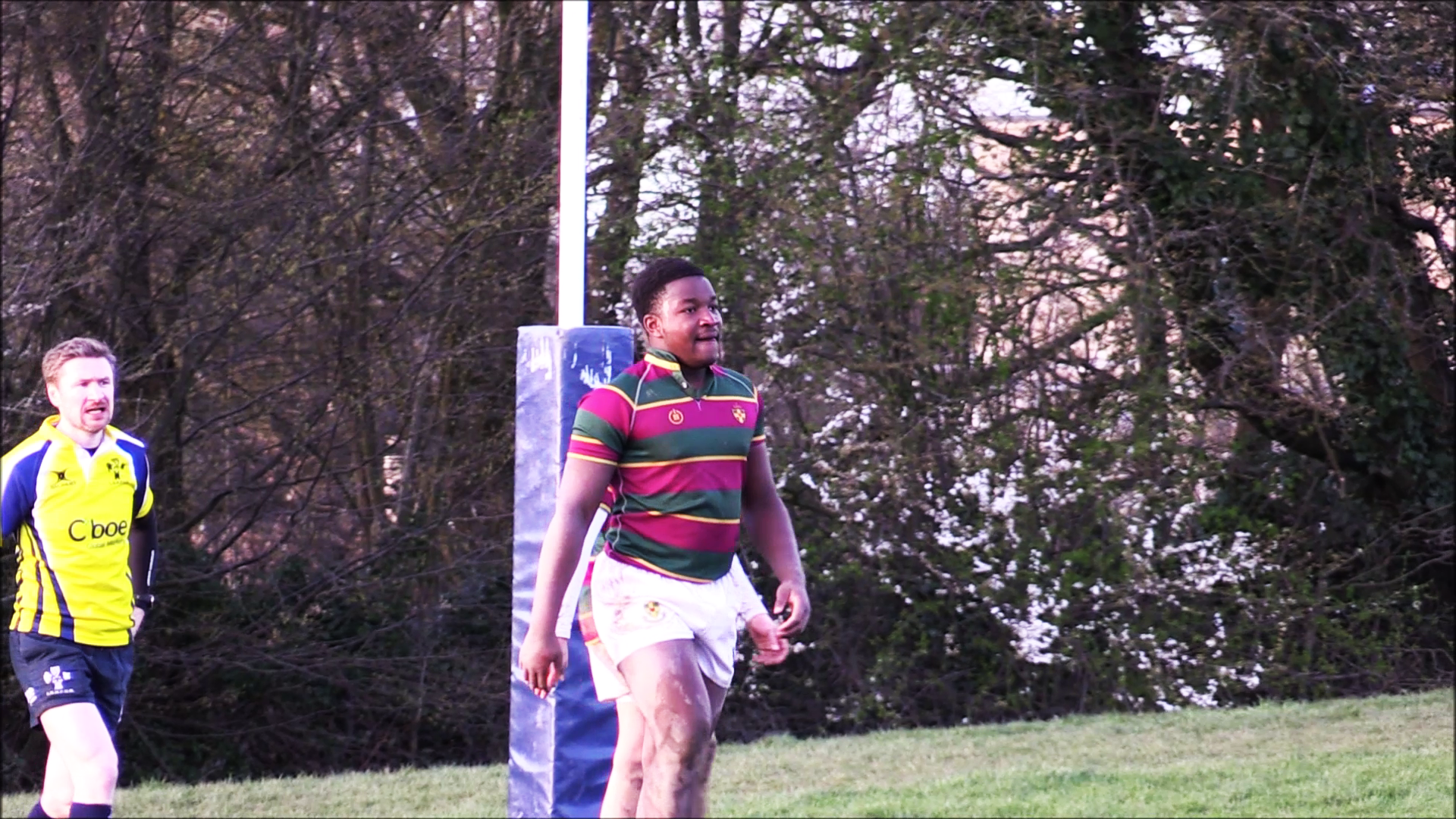
- Jibulu in 2019
- Born: 26 January 2003 (age 23) Croydon, England
- Height: 184 cm (6 ft 0 in)
- Weight: 110 kg (243 lb; 17 st 5 lb)
- School: Wimbledon College; Seaford College

Rugby union career
- Position: Hooker
- Current team: Sale Sharks
Youth career
- Old Wimbledonian Warriors
- 2021–2022: Harlequins
Senior career
| Years | Team | Apps | (Points) |
| 2022–2025 | Harlequins | 26 | (30) |
| 2022–2023 | → Esher RFC (loan) | 8 | (5) |
| 2023–2024 | → London Scottish (loan) | 7 | (10) |
| 2025– | Sale Sharks | 11 | (25) |
- Correct as of 26 December 2025
International career
| Years | Team | Apps | (Points) |
| 2023 | England U20 | 6 | (10) |
| 2025– | England A | 1 | (0) |
- Correct as of 15 November 2025

Nathan Jibulu (born 26 January 2003) is an English professional rugby union player who plays hooker for Premiership Rugby side Sale Sharks.

== Early life ==
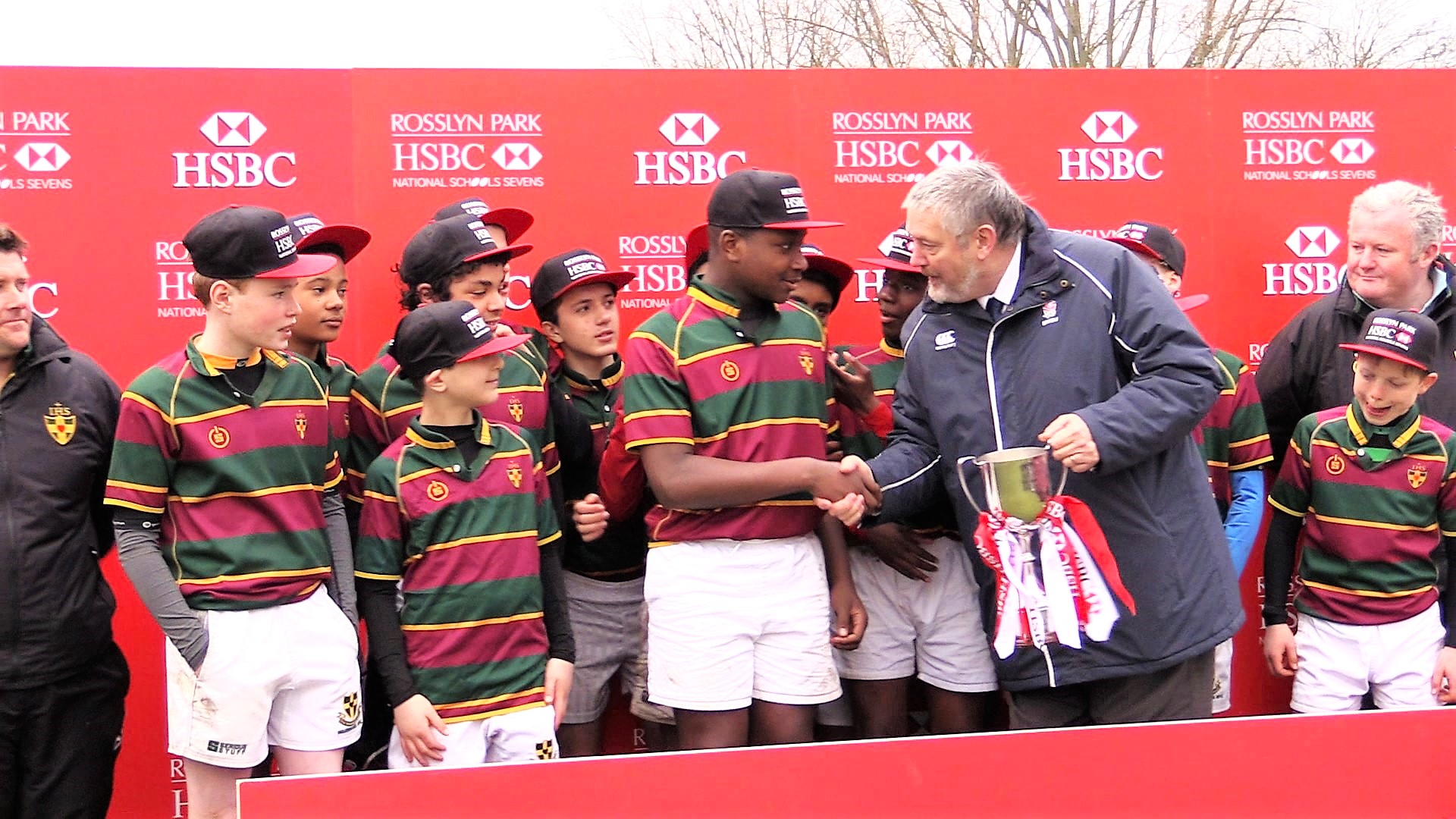
15 March 2016 - Jibulu receives the National Schools Sevens Under-13s Juniors trophy as team captain on behalf of Wimbledon College.

Jibulu attended Wimbledon College. He captained Wimbledon College in their National Schools Sevens 2016 tournament Under-13s Juniors Championship win; and a year later, was a major force in their Under-14s Championship win. And continued to be a powerful asset to Wimbledon College thereafter.

He attended Seaford College for the latter part of his schooling; also playing club rugby for Wimbledon Warriors.

Jibulu joined the senior academy at Harlequins prior to the 2021-22 season.

== Club career ==
Jibulu made a try-scoring debut Harlequins in the Premiership Rugby Cup against Saracens in September 2022. That season, he also spent time on loan at Esher RFC.

Jibulu scored a try in the Premiership for Harlequins against Northampton Saints in November 2023. He also featured for the club in the European Rugby Champions Cup against Toulouse the following month. He signed a new contract with the club in February 2023, and also played on loan at London Scottish during the 2023-24 season as well as featuring for Harlequins.

He made his first start in the Rugby Premiership for Harlequins on 28 September 2024, scoring Harlequins' first try in a 28-14 win against Newcastle Falcons.

In February 2025 it was confirmed that Jibulu had signed for Sale Sharks..
Sale Sharks announced at the end of July 2026 that Jibulu has signed a major long-term contract extension keeping him at the club until at least 2030.

== International career ==
Jibulu made his debut for the England U20 side during the last round of the 2023 Six Nations Under 20s Championship. Later that year he was a member of the England squad that finished fourth at the 2023 World Rugby U20 Championship in South Africa and scored a try during a pool stage draw with Australia.

In November 2024, Jibulu was called-up to train with the England A team. A year later in November 2025, he made his first appearance for England A starting in a victory against Spain.
