= Gwilym Evans =

Welsh rugby union player

- Born: 25 May 2003 (age 23) Cardiff, Wales
- Height: 183 cm (6 ft 0 in)
- Weight: 103 kg (227 lb; 16 st 3 lb)
- School: Ysgol Gyfun Gymraeg Glantaf
- University: Cardiff University

Rugby union career
- Position: Flanker
- Current team: Ospreys
Senior career
Years	Team	Apps	(Points)
2025–	Ospreys	8	(0)
- Correct as of 2 January 2026
International career
Years	Team	Apps	(Points)
2023	Wales U20	4	(0)
- Correct as of 2 January 2026

Gwilym Evans (born 25 May 2003) is a Welsh rugby union player, who plays for the Ospreys in the United Rugby Championship. His preferred position is flanker.

== Early career ==
Evans is from Cardiff in Wales and came through the Cardiff Rugby academy, captaining their U18 side in 2021. He attended Ysgol Gyfun Gymraeg Glantaf where he played rugby league as well as union, before attending Cardiff University. In 2023, he was selected for the Wales U20 national side.

== Professional career ==
After leaving the Cardiff academy and completing his studies, Evans signed for semi-professional Aberavon RFC in July 2024. His performances for the side earned him a dual-contract with the Ospreys ahead of the 2025–26 United Rugby Championship. He made his debut for the Ospreys in round 4 of the season against Glasgow Warriors, before making his first start in November against Edinburgh.

Evans signed a new contract with the Ospreys on 10 July 2026.
