= Joe Finn =

Australian rules footballer

Personal information
- Full name: Joe Finn
- Born: 25 February 1917
- Died: 25 March 2009 (aged 92)
- Original team: Ballarat
- Height: 173 cm (5 ft 8 in)
- Weight: 68 kg (150 lb)

Playing career^{1}
Years	Club	Games (Goals)
1945	Geelong	8 (1)
- ^{1} Playing statistics correct to the end of 1945.

Joe Finn (25 February 1917 – 25 March 2009) was an Australian rules footballer who played with Geelong in the Victorian Football League (VFL).
