= Ollie Blyth-Lafferty =

Scottish rugby union player

- Born: 6 April 2006 (age 20) Edinburgh, Scotland
- Height: 1.92 m (6 ft 4 in)
- Weight: 136 kg (300 lb; 21 st 6 lb)

Rugby union career
- Position: Tighthead prop
- Current team: Edinburgh
Senior career
Years	Team	Apps	(Points)
2023–24	Currie Chieftains	11	(0)
2025–	Edinburgh	20	(0)
- Correct as of 22 September 2026
International career
Years	Team	Apps	(Points)
2024–	Scotland U20	17	(15)
2024	Emerging Scotland	2	(0)
- Correct as of 10 November 2026

Ollie Blyth-Lafferty (born 6 April 2006) is a Scottish rugby union player who plays as a tighthead prop for Edinburgh Rugby in the United Rugby Championship. He is the younger brother of Edinburgh hooker Jerry Blyth-Lafferty.

== Early life ==
Blyth-Lafferty was born and raised in Edinburgh and came through Boroughmuir RFC's youth system from Primary 1, following his father and older brother Jerry into the game. At 16, he had arranged a plumbing apprenticeship before Edinburgh Rugby offered him an academy contract.

== Club career ==
After spells with Currie and Heriot's in the Scottish Premiership, Blyth-Lafferty made his Edinburgh debut off the bench against the Ospreys before earning his first start against RC Toulon in the Heineken Champions Cup. He signed his first professional contract in 2025, running until the end of the 2027–28 season.

== International career ==
Blyth-Lafferty was ruled ineligible for the 2024 Under-20 Six Nations under World Rugby front-rower age regulations, his 18th birthday falling after the tournament. He went on to captain the Scotland Under-20s, and in 2024 he and brother Jerry became the first pair of brothers to start together in a Scotland Under-20 front row, against Samoa in the World Rugby Under 20 Trophy. Scotland won the 2026 World Rugby Under 20 Championship, with Blyth-Lafferty scoring three tries in the tournament.

Ollie was selected for the Emerging Scotland sides to play Tonga XV and Italy U23 in late 2024. Playing in the starting XV for both matches.

== Honours ==
=== Currie RFC (Currie Chieftains) ===
- Scottish Premiership Champion 2024

=== Scotland U20 ===
- World Rugby U20 Trophy Champion 2024
