= Elliot Williams (rugby union) =

English rugby union player (born 2001)

- Born: 29 May 2007 (age 19)
- Height: 1.96 m (6 ft 5 in)
- Weight: 123 kg (19 st 5 lb; 271 lb)
- School: Gordon's School

Rugby union career
- Position(s): Flanker; Lock
- Current team: Harlequins
Senior career
Years	Team	Apps	(Points)
2025-	Harlequins		
International career
Years	Team	Apps	(Points)
2024–2025	England U18		
2026–	England U20		

Elliot Williams (born 29 May 2007) is an English professional rugby union player who plays for Premiership club Harlequins.

== Early life ==
From Staines-upon-Thames, both his parents were basketball players. He played football and tennis before focusing on rugby union. He was 6ft 6ins and 123kgs by the age of 19 years-old. He started playing rugby union at London Irish Amateurs and with a scholarship attended Gordon's School. His has younger brothers, James and Zach, who are twins and both also play rugby union, for Twickenham RFC.

== Club career ==
Williams made his debut for Harlequins during the 2025-26 season and made his first start in the league for the club in the second row against Bristol in March 2026. He also made his debut in the European Rugby Champions Cup that season in a 61-10 victory over the Stormers. Having gone on to make twelve first-team appearances for the club that season. Ahead of the 2026-27 season, he signed a new long term contract with Harlequins. He was included as a replacement for Harlequins match in the EPCR Challenge Cup match against RC Vannes on 18 October 2026 for his first appearance in a match-day squad in the 2026-27 season.

== International career ==
He made his debut for England national under-18 rugby union team in March 2024 at the U18 Six Nations Festival in Parma in a 36-35 victory over Wales U18. Having gone on to captain the team, Williams made his debut for England U19s in March 2025, aged 17 years-old.

Williams played for the England national under-20 rugby union team in the 2026 Six Nations under-20 championship, his performances including a try away against France U20. He was part of the England U20 squad that placed fourth at the 2025 World Rugby U20 Championship.
