= Jake Dalziel =

Scotland international rugby union player (born 2008))

- Born: 18 August 2008 (age 18) Melrose, Scotland
- Height: 1.95 m (6 ft 5 in)
- Weight: 93 kg (205 lb)
- School: Merchiston Castle School
- Notable relative: John Dalziel (father)

Rugby union career
- Position: Fly-half
- Current team: Newcastle Red Bulls
Senior career
Years	Team	Apps	(Points)
2026–	Newcastle Red Bulls	1	(0)
International career
Years	Team	Apps	(Points)
2026–	Scotland U20		

Jake Dalziel (born 18 August 2008) is a Scottish professional rugby union player who plays as a fly-half for English PREM Rugby club Newcastle Red Bulls.

== Club career ==
Educated Merchiston Castle School, he played first XV rugby for Melrose RFC. Dalziel joined Newcastle Red Bulls on an academy contract in the summer of 2026. He plays at fly-half.

At the start of the 2026-27 season, Dalziel became the youngest-ever debutant for Newcastle Red Bulls in the Rugby Premiership when he came off the bench in the 27th minute against Exeter Chiefs in a 34-28 defeat. At the age of 18 years and 54 days, he broke the 22-year-old record previously held by England international Mathew Tait.

== International career ==
Dalziel played above his age-grade for Scotland U20, be becoming the youngest ever to play for Scotland at that level at the age of 17-years-old. Playing in the 2026 U20 Six Nations, he started all five games, and made the four-man shortlist for player of the tournament. He later played at the 2026 World Rugby U20 Championship.

== Personal life ==
Dalziel is the son of Scotland forwards coach John Dalziel.
