= Luke Evans (rugby union) =

Welsh rugby union footballer

- Born: 18 July 1988 (age 38) Dorset, England
- Height: 1.78 m (5 ft 10 in)
- Weight: 87 kg (192 lb)
- School: The Southport School
- Notable relative: Leigh Halfpenny (second cousin)

Rugby union career
- Position: Scrum-half
Senior career
Years	Team	Apps	(Points)
2007-08	Cardiff		
2008-09	Glamorgan Wanderers	16	(5)
International career
Years	Team	Apps	(Points)
2006	Australian Schoolboys		
2008	Wales under-20		

Luke Evans (born 18 July 1988), is a Welsh rugby union footballer who played for the Australian Schoolboys national rugby union team and the Wales national under-20 rugby union team. Born in Dorset, England, he was reared in Australia but can play for the Welsh national through the lineage of his Welsh father. He was originally part of the Queensland Reds' academy, before moving to Cardiff RFC in September 2007.

== Early life ==
Born in Dorset, and having spent his early years in Wales, Luke moved with his family to Australia when he was thirteen years old in 2001. He began playing rugby whilst attending The Southport School, in Queensland. Luke's godfather was former Llanelli and British Lions coach Carwyn James.

== Career ==
Luke played for the Australian Schoolboys national rugby union team during their tour of Fiji and New Zealand in 2006. He moved from Australia to sign for Cardiff RFC in September 2007, having previously been training at the Queensland Reds' academy. Rob Howley scouted Evans whilst on a trip to visit the teams around Brisbane. He was signed to play for Cardiff RFC, whilst providing cover for the two Cardiff Blues scrum halves. His first match for Cardiff was against Aberavon RFC, when he was brought off the bench after only seven minutes following an injury to Gareth Baber. Upon his move to Cardiff, he was reunited with his second cousin Leigh Halfpenny, who he had last seen as a toddler.

Following his move to Cardiff, he joined the Wales national under-20 rugby union team during their 2008 Six Nations Under 20s Championship campaign. He moved to play for Glamorgan Wanderers for the 2008/09 season.
