= Avchala Rugby Stadium =

Football stadium in Tbilisi, Georgia

- Interactive map of Avchala Rugby Stadium
- Full name: Avchala Rugby Stadium
- Address: Tbilisi; Georgia
- Location: (Georgia (country)) Tbilisi, Georgia
- Owner: Government of Georgia
- Capacity: 3,200

Construction
- Groundbreaking: 2015; 11 years ago

Tenants
- Georgia national rugby union team Black Lion; RC Locomotive Tbilisi

Avchala Rugby Stadium (Georgian: ავჭალის რაგბის სტადიონი) is a dedicated rugby union venue in the Avchala district of northern Tbilisi, Georgia. It regularly hosts domestic club matches, international fixtures involving Georgia, and major age-grade rugby tournaments.

== Histtory ==
Previously a simple sports field, the stadium was renovated, expanded, and reopened in September 2015 following funding of 521,000 GEL.

The stadium is used by RC Locomotive Tbilisi in the Didi 10, whilst the national team has regularly played test matches there. Most notably, it has hosted World Rugby tournaments, including the World Rugby Tbilisi Cup in 2013, 2014 and 2015.

The stadium also hosted the 2011 IRB Junior World Rugby Trophy, 2017 World Rugby Under 20 Championship and 2026 World Rugby Junior World Championship.

More recently, it has hosted the Black Lion matches in the EPCR Challenge Cup.

== Rugby union test matches ==
Competition	Team	Score	Team
2012 European Nations Cup	Georgia	32–7	Portugal
2014European Nations Cup	Georgia	35–0	Belgium
2016 European Nations Cup	Georgia	59–7	Germany
2018 November internationals	Georgia	27–19	Samoa
2019 Rugby Europe Championship	Georgia	24–10	Spain
2023 Rugby Europe Championship	Georgia	75–12	Germany
2023 Rugby Europe Championship	Georgia	31–7	Romania
2026 World Rugby Nations Cup	Georgia	–	Canada
2026 World Rugby Nations Cup	Georgia	–	Tonga
