= Tom Rowe (rugby union) =

New Zealand rugby union player

- Born: 21 February 1991 (age 35) New Zealand
- Height: 195 cm (6 ft 5 in)
- Weight: 110 kg (17 st 5 lb; 240 lb)

Rugby union career
- Position: Lock
- Current team: Shimizu Blue Sharks
Senior career
Years	Team	Apps	(Points)
2019–2023	Kyuden Voltex	29	(15)
2023–	Shimizu Blue Sharks	29	(10)
- Correct as of 22 February 2021
Provincial / State sides
Years	Team	Apps	(Points)
2016–2018	Otago	16	(0)
Super Rugby
Years	Team	Apps	(Points)
2019–2020	Sunwolves	12	(5)

Thomas Brian Rowe (born 21 February 1991) is a New Zealand rugby union player who plays as a lock. He currently plays for Japanese team Sunwolves in Super Rugby.
