= England national under-20 rugby union team =

England U-20
- Union: Rugby Football Union
- Emblem: Red Rose
- Ground: Twickenham
- Coach: Mark Mapletoft
- Captain: Finn Carnduff
- Top scorer: Tom Homer
- Most tries: Jonny May
Team kit	Change kit

First international
- England 28–15 Wales (1 Feb 2008)

Largest win
- England 109–0 United States (13 June 2013)

Largest defeat
- New Zealand 64–17 England (18 June 2017)

World Cup
- Appearances: 13 (First in 2008)
- Best result: Champions (2013, 2014, 2016, 2024)

The England Under 20 rugby team are the newest representative rugby union team from England. They replace the two former age grade teams Under 19s and Under 21s. They compete in the annual Six Nations Under 20s Championship and World Rugby Under 20 Championship.

The head coach of the team is Alan Dickens.

== World Rugby Under 20 Championship ==
Their first tournament was the 2008 IRB Junior World Championship, in which they took second place, being defeated by New Zealand 3–38 in the final. The following year saw England finish runners up to New Zealand again at the 2009 IRB Junior World Championship.

At the 2010 IRB Junior World Championship, they reached the semi-finals after winning all of their pool stage games against Argentina, Ireland and France. They lost the semi-final to Australia 16–28 and then lost against South Africa 22–27 to finish in 4th place. England finished runners up to New Zealand again at the 2011 IRB Junior World Championship.

At the 2013 IRB Junior World Championship, England defeated New Zealand 33-21 in the semi-final. In the final against Wales, tries from Jack Nowell and Sam Hill saw England recover from a dozen point half-time deficit to become World Champions at junior level for the first time.

England retained their title at the 2014 IRB Junior World Championship, defeating South Africa in the final. The following year saw England lose in the final of the 2015 World Rugby Under 20 Championship to New Zealand. England hosted the 2016 World Rugby Under 20 Championship. They regained the title after defeating Ireland in the final.

England were runners up to both New Zealand at the 2017 tournament and hosts France at the 2018 World Rugby Under 20 Championship. England won the 2024 World Rugby U20 Championship, defeating France 21-13 in the final.

=== Championship record ===
Year	Round	Position	Pld	W	D	L	PF	PA
(Wales) 2008	Runners-up	2nd	5	4	0	1	148	104
(Japan) 2009	Runners-up	2nd	5	4	0	1	193	79
(Argentina) 2010	Semi-final	4th	5	3	0	2	139	107
(Italy) 2011	Runners-up	2nd	5	4	0	1	153	114
(South Africa) 2012	Pool stage	7th	5	3	0	2	128	88
(France) 2013	Champions	1st	5	4	0	1	219	73
(New Zealand) 2014	Champions	1st	5	5	0	0	181	78
(Italy) 2015	Runners-up	2nd	5	3	0	2	151	94
(England) 2016	Champions	1st	5	5	0	0	193	61
(Georgia (country)) 2017	Runners-up	2nd	5	4	0	1	169	144
(France) 2018	Runners-up	2nd	5	4	0	1	174	97
(Argentina) 2019	Pool stage	5th	5	4	0	1	181	147
2020–2022	Cancelled due to COVID-19 pandemic							
(South Africa) 2023	Semi-final	4th	5	1	2	2	155	137
(South Africa) 2024	Champions	1st	5	5	0	0	157	77
(Italy) 2025	Pool stage	6th	5	3	0	2	205	168
Total	15/15	4 Titles	75	56	2	17	2,546	1,568

== Overall ==
All results, up to and including the 2020 Six Nations Under 20s Championship and the 2019 World Rugby Under 20 Championship.

Opponent	Played	Won	Lost	Drawn	% Won
Argentina	3	3	0	0	100%
Australia	7	6	1	0	85.71%
Canada	1	1	0	0	100%
Fiji	1	1	0	0	100%
France	18	12	6	0	66.67%
Ireland	20	13	7	0	65.00%
Italy	18	17	1	0	94.45%
Japan	2	2	0	0	100%
New Zealand	6	1	5	0	16.66%
Samoa	2	2	0	0	100%
Scotland	17	15	2	0	88.23%
South Africa	11	8	3	0	72.72%
United States	1	1	0	0	100%
Wales	16	13	3	0	81.25%
Total	123	95	28	0	77.87%

== Players ==
=== Current squad ===
This is the England U20 Men’s Elite Player Squad for the 2025/26 season.

Player	Position	Club
Aiden Ainsworth-Cave		(England) Northampton Saints
Olly Allport		(England) Gloucester
Diamond Ayiehfor		(England) Leicester Tigers
Jonno Balding		(England) Gloucester
Charlie Barker		(England) Saracens
Sam Bland		(England) Harlequins
Kealan Freeman-Price		(England) Gloucester
Jerold Gorleku		(England) Harlequins
Kieran Hill		(England) Bristol Bears
Patrick Hogg		(England) Sale Sharks
Seb Kelly		(England) Sale Sharks
George Knowles		(England) Gloucester
Jack Lightbown		(England) Sale Sharks
George Marsh		(England) Leicester Tigers
Jack Murphy		(England) Saracens
Alan Poku		(England) Saracens
Ollie Scola		(England) Northampton Saints
Oliver Spencer		(England) Sale Sharks
Jimmy Staples		(England) Harlequins
Ollie Streeter		(England) Harlequins
Ethan Surrey		(England) Bristol Bears
Sonny Tonga'uiha		(England) Northampton Saints
Connor Treacey		(England) Bath
Elliot Williams		(England) Harlequins
Tate Williams		(England) Harlequins
Ollie Batson		(England) Exeter Chiefs
Noah Caluori		(England) Saracens
Finlay Cunnison		(England) Harlequins
Jack Cotgreave		(England) Gloucester
Luke Davidson		(England) Saracens
Ollie Davies		(England) Sale Sharks
Zac Finch		(England) Saracens
Lucas Friday		(England) Harlequins
Kesena Izu		(England) Leicester Tigers
Seva Kava		(England) Saracens
Will Knight		(England) Gloucester
Nick Lilley		(England) Exeter Chiefs
James Linegar		(England) Bath
Henry Lumley		(England) Northampton Saints
George Newman		(England) Exeter Chiefs
Tyler Offiah		(England) Bath
James Pater		(England) Northampton Saints
George Pearson		(England) Leicester Tigers
Asa Stewart-Harris		(England) Saracens
Freddie St John		(England) Northampton Saints
Tom Threlfall		(England) Leicester Tigers
Jonny Weimann		(England) Northampton Saints
Toby Wilson		(England) Sale Sharks
Sam Winters		(England) Bath
Victor Worsnip		(England) Bristol Bears

=== Award winners ===
The following England U20s players have been recognised at the World Rugby Awards since 2008:

World Rugby Junior Player of the Year
Year	Nominees	Winners
2008	Joe Simpson	—
2009	Carl Fearns	—
2011	George Ford	George Ford
2013	Jack Clifford	—
2014	Nathan Earle	—
2015	James Chisholm	James Chisholm
2016	Harry Mallinder	—
2017	Gabriel Ibitoye	—
2017	Zach Mercer	—
2018	Gabriel Ibitoye (2)	—
2018	Jordan Olowofela	—

=== Management ===
- Mark Mapletoft (head coach)
- Andy Titterrell (forwards coach)

== Honours ==
- Under-20 Rugby World Cup

Winners (4): 2013, 2014, 2016, 2024
Runners-up (6): 2008, 2009, 2011, 2015, 2017, 2018

- Under-20 Six Nations

Winners (8): 2008, 2011, 2012, 2013, 2015, 2017, 2021, 2024
Grand Slam (4): 2008, 2011, 2017, 2021
Triple Crown (6): 2008, 2011, 2012, 2014, 2017, 2021

== See also ==
- England national rugby union team
- England women's national rugby union team
- England national rugby sevens team
- England Saxons
