= Premiership Rugby Cup =

English rugby union knockout cup competition

- Upcoming season or competition: 2026–27 PREM Rugby Cup
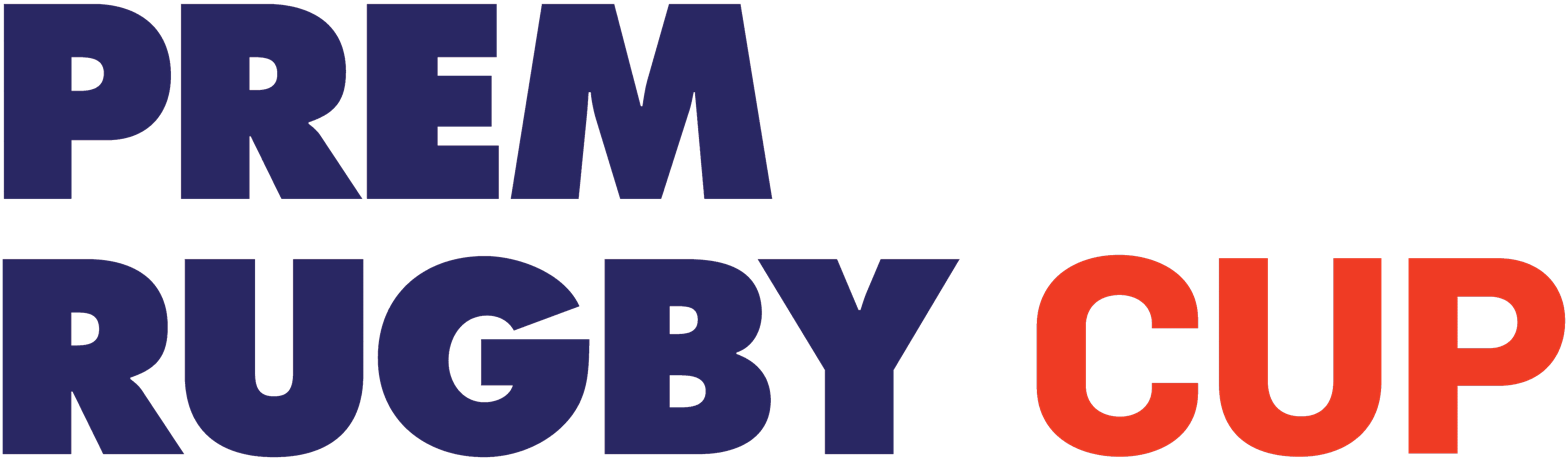
- Sport: Rugby union
- Founded: 2018; 8 years ago
- First season: 2018–19
- No. of teams: 12 (2018–23); 22 (2023–24); 20 (2024–25); 10 (2025–)
- Country: England
- Most recent champion: Leicester Tigers (1st title) (2025–26)
- Broadcaster: TNT Sports
- Related competitions: Premiership Rugby; RFU Championship
- Website: premiershiprugby.com/cup

The PREM Rugby Cup, formerly known as Premiership Rugby Cup, is an English rugby union knockout cup competition for teams in Premiership Rugby. For the 2023–24 and 2024–25 season RFU Championship teams also competed. It was created in 2018 to replace the Anglo-Welsh Cup after the withdrawal of the Welsh regions.

== History ==
The Premiership Rugby Cup was created to replace the Anglo-Welsh Cup which had been running since 2005 when the Welsh regions joined the then English-only Powergen Cup. In the 2017–18 Anglo-Welsh Cup, all four of the Welsh regions finished bottom of their pools. In May 2018, the Welsh Rugby Union announced that they were going to be setting up a Welsh under-23s competition for their regions and would thus be unable to commit to Anglo-Welsh Cup games. Premiership Rugby Limited, which organises the English top flight, then announced that the Anglo-Welsh Cup would be replaced by the Premiership Rugby Cup, which would be solely for the English Premiership clubs. The new Premiership Cup was created to re-establish the significance of the domestic cup competition and support development of younger English Premiership players by providing a platform to compete in more matches at Premiership stadia.

The 2020–21 tournament was cancelled due to the effects of the COVID-19 pandemic.

Teams from the RFU Championship competed in the 2023–24 and 2024–25 seasons. From the 2025–26 season, no RFU Champ teams were involved and the competition was renamed PREM Rugby Cup.

== Format ==
The format for the competition until 2019–20 consisted of the twelve Premiership teams grouped into three pools of four with at least one club having one local derby match in their groups. The matches were typically held over either the Autumn International or Rugby World Cup and Six Nations Championship weekends. The three pool winners and the best runner-up entered the semi-finals with home advantage given to the team with the better record in the pool stage and the final would be held at the home of the highest ranked club. The winning club received £500,000.

After a year's hiatus due to the COVID-19 pandemic, the competition returned for 2021–22 season. The thirteen premiership rugby teams were split into one pool of five teams and two pools of four teams. Each team played the other teams in their pool and also played an additional inter pool match if required.

For 2023–24 the twelve teams from the RFU Championship joined the ten teams from the Premiership. The first stage of the competition took place over five consecutive weekends during the Rugby World Cup.

For 2025–26, only the ten PREM rugby teams competed. The 2025–26 edition features two pools of five teams. Each team played the other teams in their pool twice, once at home and once away, over ten rounds between September 2025 and February 2026. The top two teams from each pool progressed to the semi-finals, with the winners meeting in the final the week after the semi-finals.

== Finals ==
Ed.	Year	Winner	Score	Runner-up	Venue	Attendance
1	2018–19	Northampton Saints	23–9	Saracens	Franklin's Gardens	15,250
2	2019–20	Sale Sharks	27–19	Harlequins	AJ Bell Stadium	0 (Note: Match was played behind closed doors due to ongoing COVID-19 pandemic.)
–	2020–21	(No competition held due to COVID-19 pandemic)				
3	2021–22	Worcester Warriors (Note: Worcester Warriors were crowned champions due to scoring a higher number of tries.)	25–25 (a.e.t.)	London Irish	Brentford Community Stadium	9,531
4	2022–23	Exeter Chiefs	24–20 (a.e.t.)	London Irish	Brentford Community Stadium	9,003
5	2023–24	Gloucester	23–13	Leicester Tigers	Kingsholm Stadium	14,460
6	2024–25	Bath	48–14	Exeter Chiefs	Sandy Park	11,182
7	2025–26	Leicester Tigers	66–14	Exeter Chiefs	Welford Road	

=== List of champions ===
#	Team	Wins	Years
1	Northampton Saints	1	2019
1	Sale Sharks	1	2020
1	Worcester Warriors	1	2022
1	Exeter Chiefs	1	2023
1	Gloucester	1	2024
1	Bath	1	2025
1	Leicester Tigers	1	2026

== See also ==
- Premiership Rugby
- RFU Championship
- Anglo-Welsh Cup
- RFU Knockout Cup
- Championship Cup
- RFU Intermediate Cup
- RFU Senior Vase
- RFU Junior Vase
- Rugby union in England
