= Jonathan Wren (rugby union) =

Irish rugby union player (born 1999)

- Born: 26 March 1999 (age 27) Crosshaven, Ireland
- Height: 1.80 m (5 ft 11 in)
- Weight: 88 kg (13.9 st; 194 lb)
- School: Presentation Brothers College

Rugby union career
- Position(s): Fullback, Wing
Amateur team(s)
| Years | Team | Apps | (Points) |
| 2018–2022 | Cork Constitution | | |
Senior career
| Years | Team | Apps | (Points) |
| 2021–2022 | Munster | 1 | (0) |
- Correct as of 12 December 2021
International career
| Years | Team | Apps | (Points) |
| 2019 | Ireland U20 | 10 | (15) |
- Correct as of 22 June 2019

Jonathan Wren (born 26 March 1999) is an Irish former rugby union player. He played as a fullback or wing and represented Cork Constitution in the All-Ireland League.

== Early life ==
Wren first began playing rugby at an early age for Crosshaven, and started at fullback for Presentation Brothers College in their 11–3 win against Glenstal Abbey School in the final of the 2017 Munster Schools Rugby Senior Cup, in a team alongside former Munster teammates Seán French and Jack O'Sullivan. Wren has also won representation for Munster at under-18 and under-19 level, and Ireland at under-18 and under-19 level.

== Cork Constitution ==
Wren was part of the Cork Con team that won the Munster Senior Cup and All-Ireland League Division 1A during the 2018–19 season.

== Munster ==
Wren joined the Munster academy ahead of the 2018–19 season. After injury hampered his final year in the academy, Wren extended his time with the programme for the 2021–22 to continue his development. Following the disruption caused by the province's recent tour to South Africa, Wren made his senior competitive debut for Munster in their opening 2021–22 Champions Cup fixture away to English club Wasps on 12 December 2021, coming on as a replacement for Patrick Campbell in the province's 35–14 win. Wren was forced to retire from rugby at the end of the 2021–22 season on medical grounds.

== Ireland ==
Wren was selected in the Ireland under-20s squad for the 2019 Six Nations Under 20s Championship, and started in the wins against England, Scotland, Italy, France, and Wales, as Ireland secured their first grand slam since 2007. He was retained in the under-20s squad for the 2019 World Rugby Under 20 Championship when it was confirmed in May 2019.

== Honours ==
=== Presentation Brothers College ===
- Munster Schools Rugby Senior Cup:
  - Winner (1): 2017

=== Cork Constitution ===
- All-Ireland League Division 1A:
  - Winner (1): 2018–19
- Munster Senior Cup:
  - Winner (2): 2018–19, 2019–20

=== Ireland under-20s ===
- Six Nations Under 20s Championship:
  - Winner (1): 2019
- Grand Slam:
  - Winner (1): 2019
- Triple Crown:
  - Winner (1): 2019
