= Seán French (rugby union) =

Irish rugby union player (born 1999)

- Born: 14 August 1999 (age 27) Cork, Ireland
- Height: 1.88 m (6 ft 2 in)
- Weight: 99 kg (15.6 st; 218 lb)
- School: Presentation Brothers College
- University: University College Cork

Rugby union career
- Position(s): Centre, Wing, Fullback
Amateur team(s)
Years	Team	Apps	(Points)
2018–2022	Cork Constitution		
Senior career
Years	Team	Apps	(Points)
2020–2022	Munster	2	(5)
2022–	Bedford Blues	24	(92)
- Correct as of 29 April 2023
International career
Years	Team	Apps	(Points)
2019	Ireland U20	4	(0)
- Correct as of 4 June 2019

Seán French (born 14 August 1999) is an Irish rugby union player for English RFU Championship club Bedford Blues. He plays as a centre, wing or fullback.

== Early life ==
Born in Cork, French won the Munster Schools Rugby Senior Cup in 2017 with Presentation Brothers College, alongside former Munster teammates Jonathan Wren and Jack O'Sullivan, with French scoring all of PBC's points in their 11–3 victory. He was subsequently named in the top XV for the tournament that year. French also represented Munster at under-18 and under-19 level, as well as Ireland at under-18 and under-19 level.

== Career ==
=== Cork Constitution ===
French was part of the Cork Con team that won the Munster Senior Cup during the 2018–19 season. He also scored a try in Con's 23–3 win against Dublin University on 28 April 2019, a victory that ensured Con progressed to the final of the 2018–19 All-Ireland League against Clontarf, and went on to start in the final, which Con won 28–13. French scored nine points in Con's 24–17 win against Young Munster in the final of the 2019–20 Munster Senior Cup on 20 December 2019.

=== Munster ===
French joined the Munster academy ahead of the 2018–19 season, and made his first appearance for Munster A in their 24–16 win against Connacht Eagles in round 1 of the 2018–19 Celtic Cup on 7 September 2018, before going on to feature in all Munster A's fixtures in the tournament. French made his senior competitive debut for Munster against Italian side Zebre in round 8 of the 2020–21 Pro14 on 30 November 2020, coming on in the 21st minute as a replacement for injured fullback Matt Gallagher and scoring a try in the province's 52–3 win. He joined the Munster senior squad on a one-year contract for the 2021–22 season, and made his first start for Munster in their 18–13 home win against provincial rivals Ulster in round 10 of the 2021–22 United Rugby Championship on 8 January 2022. French left Munster at the end of the 2021–22 season.

=== Bedford Blues ===
French joined English RFU Championship club Bedford Blues ahead of the 2022–23 season.

=== Ireland ===
French was selected in the Ireland under-20's squad for the 2019 Six Nations Under 20s Championship, featuring off the bench in the opening 35–27 win against England and starting in the wins against France and Wales, the latter of which secured Ireland's first grand slam since 2007. He was retained in the under-20s squad for the 2019 World Rugby Under 20 Championship, and featured off the bench in the opening fixture against England, preventing English lock Joel Kpoku from scoring a try and helping to set up John Hodnett's try to seal Ireland's 46–26 win. However, French sustained a facial injury during the game which ruled him out of the remainder of the tournament.

== Honours ==
=== Presentation Brothers College ===
- Munster Schools Rugby Senior Cup:
  - Winner (1): 2017

=== Cork Constitution ===
- All-Ireland League Division 1A:
  - Winner (1): 2018–19
- Munster Senior Cup:
  - Winner (2): 2018–19, 2019–20

=== Ireland under-20s ===
- Six Nations Under 20s Championship:
  - Winner (1): 2019
- Grand Slam:
  - Winner (1): 2019
- Triple Crown:
  - Winner (1): 2019
