= 2013 Six Nations Under 20s Championship =

Rugby union competition

- Date: 1 February 2013 – 17 March 2013
- Countries: England; France; Ireland; Italy; Scotland; Wales

Tournament statistics
- Champions: England (4th title)

The 2013 Six Nations Under 20s Championship was a rugby union competition held between February and March 2013. England won the tournament.

== Final table ==
Position	Nation	Games				Points				Table points
Position	Nation	Played	Won	Drawn	Lost	For	Against	Difference	Tries	Table points
1	England	5	4	0	1	150	54	+96	17	8
2	Wales	5	4	0	1	126	83	+43	13	8
3	Ireland	5	2	1	2	98	83	+15	10	5
4	Scotland	5	2	0	3	84	107	−23	9	4
5	France	5	2	0	3	54	105	−51	5	4
6	Italy	5	0	1	4	65	145	−80	8	1

== Results ==
=== Round one ===
Fri 1 February 2013
17:45

England	15–6	Scotland
Try: Penalty try Cowan-Dickie; Con: Slade; Pen: Slade		Pen: Allan (2)

The Brickfields

Fri 1 February 2013
18:00

Italy	6–13	France
Pen: Padovani (2)		Try: Selponi; Con: Mallet; Pen: Mallet (2)

Stadio Marco Tomaselli

Fri 1 February 2013
19:10

Wales	17–15	Ireland
Try: Jones; Pen: S. Davies (4)		Try: McGrath; Daly; Con: Daly; Pen: Daly

Eirias Stadium

=== Round two ===
Fri 8 February 2013
19:30

Scotland	30–17	Italy
Try: Allan 17' c Hoyland 64' c J. Gray 78' c Con: Allan 17'; Hagart 64', 78'; Pen: Allan 39', 44', 58'		Try: Mbanda 73' c Campagnaro 79' c Con: Buscema 73; Campagnaro 79; Pen: Padovani 15'

Netherdale

Fri 8 February 2013
19:35

Ireland	16–15	England
Try: Scholes 75' c Con: Daly; Pen: Daly (2) 23', 42'; Scholes 63'		Pen: Slade 2', 28', 32', 49', 57'

Dubarry Park

Sun 10 February 2013

France	13–27	Wales
Try: M. Wieprecht 51' c Con: B. Serin (1/1); Pen: B. Serin 18', 33'		Try: S. Bennett 6' c C. Allen 28' c A. Evans 33' c Con: S. Davies (3/3); Pen: S. Davies 56', 70'

Stade Marcel-Michelin

=== Round three ===
Fri 22 February 2013
19:00

Italy	10–25	Wales
Try: M. Mbanda 60' c Con: M. Campagnaro (1/1); Pen: E. Padovani 23'		Try: D. Thomas 1' c R.Williams 27' m Penalty try 32' c Con: S. Davies (2/3); Pen: S. Davies 68', 74'

Viterbo

Fri 22 February 2013
20:30

Scotland	21–20	Ireland
Try: R. Young 10' c D. Hoyland (2) 16' c, 72' c Con: Allan (3/3)		Try: R. Murphy 26' m D. Panter 32' m Penalty try 54' c Con: T. Daly (1/3); Pen: T. Daly 14'

Netherdale

Sat 23 February 2013
15:00

England	40–10	France
Try: Penalty try 45' c Clifford 66' c, 71' m, 78' m H. Purdy 80' c Con: Slade 45', 66', 80'; Pen: Slade 32', 38', 52'		Try: G. Lacroix 60' c Con: B. Serin; Pen: B. Serin 35'

Worcester RFC

=== Round four ===
Fri 8 March 2013
19:35

Scotland	17–42	Wales
Try: S. Muir 25' c A. Ashe 77' c Con: Allan (2/2); Pen: Allan 21'		Try: Allan 27' m Warren 36' c, 72' m R. Williams 39' c J. Williams 50' m Penalty try 65' c Con: S. Davies (3/6); Pen: S. Davies 9', 44'

Caledonian Stadium

Fri 8 March 2013
19:45

Ireland	22–5	France
Try: S. Joyce 64' c Con: T. Daly (1/1); Pen: T. Daly 5', 14', 21', 26', 29'		Try: R. Ruffenach 27' m

Dubarry Park

Fri 8 March 2013
20:05

England	52–7	Italy
Try: Hill 22' c Nowell 38' c, 75' c Braley 44' c Penalty try (2) 55' c, 64' c Stephenson 68' c Con: Slade (7/7); Pen: Slade 10'		Try: G. Vian 59' c Con: E. Padovani (1/1)

Franklin's Gardens

=== Round five ===
15 March 2013
18:00

Italy	25–25	Ireland
Try: Moriconi 3' c Campagnaro 7' m Benvenuti 25' m Odiete 43' m Con: Padovani (1/4); Pen: Padovani 17'		Try: Panter 22' c Sexton 58' m Scholes 73' c Con: Scannell (2/3); Pen: Scannell 33', 66'

Stadio di Avezzano, L'Aquila

15 March 2013
19:30

Wales	15–28	England
Pen: S. Davies 10', 18', 25', 50', 65'		Try: Nowell 13' m Wells 39' c, 77' c Con: Slade (2/3); Pen: Slade 32', 53'; Drop: Slade 61'

Eirias Stadium

17 March 2013
13:00

France	13–10	Scotland
Try: Selponi 60' c Con: Domenech (1/1); Pen: Serin (1/2) 6'; Drop: Selponi 64'		Try: Ashe 25' c Con: Allan (1/1); Pen: Allan (1/3) 20'

Stade Amédée-Domenech
