= 2020 World Rugby Under 20 Championship =

Cancelled rugby union championship

Tournament details
- Host: Italy
- Teams: 12

The 2020 World Rugby Under 20 Championship was scheduled to be the 13th edition of the World Rugby Under 20 Championship, the premier age-grade rugby union competition organised by World Rugby. The tournament was to be held in Italy for the third time, having previously been played there in 2011 and 2015. France were the defending champions.

On 20 March 2020, World Rugby announced that the championship was cancelled due to the COVID-19 pandemic.

== Teams ==
The following teams would have participated in the 2020 U20 Championship:

| Team | No. | Result (2019) | Best Result |
|---|---|---|---|
| Argentina | 12 | 4th | Third place (2016) |
| Australia | 12 | 2nd | Runners-up (2010, 2019) |
| England | 12 | 5th | Champions (2013, 2014, 2016) |
| France | 12 | 1st | Champions (2018, 2019) |
| Georgia | 4 | 10th | Ninth place (2018) |
| Ireland | 12 | 8th | Runners-up (2016) |
| Italy | 10 | 9th | Eighth place (2017, 2018) |
| Japan (Note: Promoted from 2019 U20 Trophy) | 5 | — | Tenth place (2015) |
| Fiji | 8 | 11th | Sixth place (2011) |
| New Zealand | 12 | 7th | Champions (2008, 2009, 2010, 2011, 2015, 2017) |
| South Africa | 12 | 3rd | Champions (2012) |
| Wales | 12 | 6th | Runners-up (2013) |

== Pool stage ==
The pool stage fixture was to have been as follows:

=== Pool A ===
| Team | Pld | W | D | L | PF | PA | −/+ | TF | TA | BP | Pts |
|---|---|---|---|---|---|---|---|---|---|---|---|
| France | 0 | 0 | 0 | 0 | 0 | 0 | 0 | 0 | 0 | 0 | 0 |
| Argentina | 0 | 0 | 0 | 0 | 0 | 0 | 0 | 0 | 0 | 0 | 0 |
| Ireland | 0 | 0 | 0 | 0 | 0 | 0 | 0 | 0 | 0 | 0 | 0 |
| Japan | 0 | 0 | 0 | 0 | 0 | 0 | 0 | 0 | 0 | 0 | 0 |

| Match 6 | 28 June | Argentina | Cancelled | Ireland | Peroni Stadium, Calvisano |
| | 21:00 |

| Match 4 | 28 June | France | Cancelled | Japan | Peroni Stadium, Calvisano |
| | 16:00 |

| Match 11 | 03 July | Argentina | Cancelled | Japan | Peroni Stadium, Calvisano |
| | 18:30 |

| Match 10 | 03 July | France | Cancelled | Ireland | Peroni Stadium, Calvisano |
| | 16:00 |

| Match 13 | 08 July | Ireland | Cancelled | Japan | Payanini Center, Verona |
| | 16:00 |

| Match 14 | 08 July | France | Cancelled | Argentina | Payanini Center, Verona |
| | 18:30 |

=== Pool B ===
| Team | Pld | W | D | L | PF | PA | −/+ | TF | TA | BP | Pts |
|---|---|---|---|---|---|---|---|---|---|---|---|
| Australia | 0 | 0 | 0 | 0 | 0 | 0 | 0 | 0 | 0 | 0 | 0 |
| Wales | 0 | 0 | 0 | 0 | 0 | 0 | 0 | 0 | 0 | 0 | 0 |
| New Zealand | 0 | 0 | 0 | 0 | 0 | 0 | 0 | 0 | 0 | 0 | 0 |
| Georgia | 0 | 0 | 0 | 0 | 0 | 0 | 0 | 0 | 0 | 0 | 0 |

| Match 5 | 28 June | Wales | Cancelled | New Zealand | Peroni Stadium, Calvisano |
| | 18:30 |

| Match 3 | 28 June | Australia | Cancelled | Georgia | Payanini Center, Verona |
| | 21:00 |

| Match 8 | 03 July | Wales | Cancelled | Georgia | Payanini Center, Verona |
| | 18:30 |

| Match 7 | 03 July | Australia | Cancelled | New Zealand | Payanini Center, Verona |
| | 16:00 |

| Match 16 | 08 July | New Zealand | Cancelled | Georgia | Stadio Luigi Zaffanella, Viadana |
| | 16:00 |

| Match 15 | 08 July | Australia | Cancelled | Wales | Payanini Center, Verona |
| | 21:00 |

=== Pool C ===
| Team | Pld | W | D | L | PF | PA | −/+ | TF | TA | BP | Pts |
|---|---|---|---|---|---|---|---|---|---|---|---|
| South Africa | 0 | 0 | 0 | 0 | 0 | 0 | 0 | 0 | 0 | 0 | 0 |
| England | 0 | 0 | 0 | 0 | 0 | 0 | 0 | 0 | 0 | 0 | 0 |
| Italy | 0 | 0 | 0 | 0 | 0 | 0 | 0 | 0 | 0 | 0 | 0 |
| Fiji | 0 | 0 | 0 | 0 | 0 | 0 | 0 | 0 | 0 | 0 | 0 |

| Match 1 | 28 June | South Africa | Cancelled | Italy | Payanini Center, Verona |
| | 16:00 |

| Match 2 | 28 June | England | Cancelled | Fiji | Payanini Center, Verona |
| | 18:30 |

| Match 9 | 03 July | South Africa | Cancelled | Fiji | Payanini Center, Verona |
| | 21:00 |

| Match 12 | 03 July | England | Cancelled | Italy | Peroni Stadium, Calvisano |
| | 21:00 |

| Match 18 | 08 July | South Africa | Cancelled | England | Stadio Sergio Zaffanella, Viadana |
| | 21:00 |

| Match 17 | 08 July | Italy | Cancelled | Fiji | Stadio Sergio Zaffanella, Viadana |
| | 18:30 |
