= 2015 Six Nations Under 20s Championship =

Rugby union competition

- Date: 6 February 2015 – 20 March 2015
- Countries: England; France; Ireland; Italy; Scotland; Wales

Tournament statistics
- Champions: England (5th title)

The 2015 Six Nations Under 20s Championship was a rugby union competition held between February and March 2015. England won the championship. However, no team won either a Grand Slam or the Triple Crown.

== Final table ==
Position	Nation	Games				Points				Table points
Position	Nation	Played	Won	Drawn	Lost	For	Against	Difference	Tries	Table points
1	England	5	4	0	1	145	57	+88		8
2	France	5	3	0	2	145	82	+63		6
3	Scotland	5	3	0	2	115	117	–2		6
4	Wales	5	3	0	2	102	111	–9		6
5	Ireland	5	2	0	3	120	90	30		4
6	Italy	5	0	0	5	46	216	–170		0

== Results ==
=== Round 1 ===
6 February 2015
19:00

Italy	15–47	Ireland

Stadio Pozzi La Marmora, Piedmont

7 February 2015
19:30

Wales	21–15	England

Eirias Stadium, Colwyn Bay

7 February 2015
20:55

France	47–6	Scotland

Stade Jean-Laville, France

=== Round 2 ===
13 February 2015
15:00

Scotland	36–34	Wales

Netherdale, Galashiels

13 February 2015
19:05

Ireland	37–20	France

Dubarry Park, Athlone

13 February 2015
19:45

England	61–0	Italy

Brickfields, Plymouth

=== Round 3 ===
27 February 2015
19:05

Ireland	14–19	England

Energia Park, Donnybrook, Dublin

27 February 2015
19:30

Scotland	45–0	Italy

Netherdale, Galashiels

27 February 2015
20:55

France	27–5	Wales

Stade Jules Ribert, Saint-Gaudens

=== Round 4 ===
13 March 2015
16:00

Italy	10–40	France

Stadio Mario e Romolo Pacifici, Venice

13 March 2015
17:30

England	26–11	Scotland

Northern Echo Arena, Darlington

13 March 2015
19:45

Wales	19–12	Ireland

Eirias Stadium, Colwyn Bay

=== Round 5 ===
20 March 2015
19:00

Italy	21–23	Wales

Stadio Quercia, Trento

20 March 2015
19:30

Scotland	17–10	Ireland

Netherdale, Galashiels

20 March 2015
19:55

England	24–11	France

Community Stadium, Brighton
