= 2019 Six Nations Under 20s Championship =

Rugby union tournament

- Date: 1 February – 15 March 2019
- Countries: England; France; Ireland; Italy; Scotland; Wales

Tournament statistics
- Champions: Ireland (3rd title)
- Grand Slam: Ireland (2nd title)
- Triple Crown: Ireland (3rd title)
- Matches played: 15
- Tries scored: 101 (6.73 per match)
- Top point scorer: (Ireland) Harry Byrne (36)
- Top try scorer: (Ireland) Dylan Tierney-Martin (4)

The 2019 Six Nations Under 20s Championship was the 12th series of the Six Nations Under 20s Championship, the annual northern hemisphere rugby union championship. France were the defending champions. Ireland won the tournament and a Grand Slam, after winning all five of their matches.

== Participants ==
Nation	Stadium			Head coach	Captain
Nation	Home stadium	Capacity	Location	Head coach	Captain
England	Sandy Park; Goldington Road; Franklin's Gardens	12,800; 6,000; 15,250	Exeter; Bedford; Northampton	Steve Bates	Fraser Dingwall
France	Stade de la Rabine; Stade du Hameau	9,500; 18,000	Vannes; Pau	Sébastien Piqueronies	Arthur Vincent
Ireland	Irish Independent Park	8,008	Cork	Noel McNamara	David Hawkshaw
Italy	Stadio Danilo Martelli; Stadio Centro d'Italia; Stadio Pozzi La Marmora	17,844; 10,163; 5,000	Mantua; Rieti; Biella	Alessandro Troncon	Davide Ruggeri
Scotland	Netherdale; Meggetland	4,000; 3,000	Galashiels; Edinburgh	Carl Hogg	Connor Boyle
Wales	Eirias Stadium	6,080	Colwyn Bay	Gareth Williams	Dewi Lake

== Final table ==
Position	Nation	Games				Points			Tries		Bonus points		Total points
Position	Nation	Played	Won	Drawn	Lost	For	Against	Diff	For	Against	Tries	Loss	Total points
1	Ireland	5	5	0	0	150	92	58	18	12	3	0	26*
2	France	5	3	0	2	157	130	27	22	19	4	1	17
3	England	5	3	0	2	148	82	66	20	11	3	1	16
4	Wales	5	2	0	3	100	107	−7	12	15	1	1	10
5	Italy	5	1	0	4	99	168	−69	15	22	2	1	7
6	Scotland	5	1	0	4	88	163	−75	14	22	2	0	6
*Ireland were awarded 3 bonus points for winning the Grand Slam. Source:

Table ranking rules

- Four match points are awarded for a win.
- Two match points are awarded for a draw.
- A bonus match point is awarded to a team that scores four or more tries in a match or loses a match by seven points or fewer. If a team scores four tries in a match and loses by seven points or fewer, they are awarded both bonus points.
- Three bonus match points are awarded to a team that wins all five of their matches (known as a Grand Slam). This ensures that a Grand Slam winning team reaches a minimum of 23 points, and thus always ranks over a team who won four matches in which they also were awarded four try bonus points and were also awarded two bonus points (a try bonus and a losing bonus) in the match that they lost for a total of 22 points.
- Tie-breakers
  - If two or more teams are tied on match points, the team with the better points difference (points scored less points conceded) is ranked higher.
  - If the above tie-breaker fails to separate tied teams, the team that scored the higher number of total tries in their matches is ranked higher.
  - If two or more teams remain tied for first place at the end of the championship after applying the above tiebreakers, the title is shared between them.

== Fixtures ==
=== Week 1 ===
1 February 2019
19:15

(1 BP) Ireland	35–27	England
Try: Tierney-Martin (2) 30' c, 46' m Penny 38' c Foley 79' c Con: Byrne (3/4) 32', 39', 80'; Pen: Byrne (3/4) 5', 35', 55'	Report	Try: Murley 10' c T. Willis 14' c Hodge 33' c Con: Smith (3/3) 12', 16', 34'; Pen: Smith (1/1) 40'; Hardwick (1/1) 48'

Irish Independent Park, Cork
Attendance: 5,764
Referee: Ludovic Cayre (France)

1 February 2019
19:30

Scotland	22–32	Italy (1 BP)
Try: Boyle 43' c Jupp 48' c McLean 71' m Con: Thompson (2/3) 44', 49'; Pen: Thompson (1/1) 38'	Report	Try: Nocera 23' m Taddia 58' c Mori 64' c Trulla 79' c Con: Garbisi (3/4) 59', 65', 80'; Pen: Garbisi (2/2) 12', 26'

Netherdale, Galashiels
Referee: Adam Jones (Wales)

3 February 2019
14:00

(1 BP) France	32–10	Wales
Try: Zegueur 25' c Lebel 39' c Geraci 48' m Pinto 80' c Con: Carbonel (3/4) 26', 40', 80'+1; Pen: Carbonel (2/2) 10', 59'	Report	Try: Roberts 20' c Con: Evans (1/1) 21'; Pen: Evans (1/1) 31'

Stade de la Rabine, Vannes
Attendance: 7,139
Referee: Ben Blain (Scotland)

=== Week 2 ===
8 February 2019
19:30

Scotland	5–24	Ireland
Try: Boyle 71' m	Report	Try: Tierney-Martin 21' c Hodnett 60' c Wren 80' c Con: Byrne (3/3) 22', 61', 80'+1; Pen: Byrne (1/1) 6'

Netherdale, Galashiels
Referee: Andrea Piardi (Italy)

9 February 2019
13:05

England	31–19	France
Try: Sleightholme 3' m Penalty try (2) 22', 54'; Willis 32' m Adkins 39' c Con: Smith (1/3) 40'	Report	Try: Joseph 26' m Delbouis 36' c Penalty try 74'; Con: Carbonel (1/2) 37'

Sandy Park, Exeter
Referee: Craig Evans (Wales)

10 February 2019
14:00

Italy	12–42	Wales (1 BP)
Try: Mba 60' m Trulla 78' c Con: Garbisi (1/2) 78'	Report	Try: Basham (3) 14' c, 20' c, 44' c Scragg 38' c Buckland 74' c Davies 80' c Con: Evans (4/4) 14', 20', 38', 44'; Costelow (2/2) 74', 80'

Stadio Danilo Martelli, Mantua
Attendance: 4,700
Referee: Sam Grove-White (Scotland)

=== Week 3 ===
22 February 2019
19:00

Italy	14–34	Ireland (1 BP)
Try: Nocera 73' c Butturini 78' c Con: Garbisi (2/2) 74', 79'	Report	Try: Casey (2) 10' c, 60' c Penny 38' c Hawkshaw 76' c Con: Byrne (3/3) 11', 39', 61'; Healy (1/1) 77'; Pen: Byrne (2/2) 22', 44'

Stadio Centro d'Italia, Rieti
Referee: Craig Evans (Wales)

22 February 2019
19:05

Wales	11–10	England (1 BP)
Try: Smith 80'+1 m Pen: Evans (2/2) 57', 63'	Report	Try: Tuima 69' c Con: Hodge (1/1) 70'; Pen: Wilkinson (1/2) 5'

Eirias Stadium, Colwyn Bay
Attendance: 5,000
Referee: Sean Gallagher (Ireland)

22 February 2019
21:00

(1 BP) France	42–27	Scotland (1 BP)
Try: Pinto 5' c Eglaine 13' c Favre 26' c Joseph (2) 53' c, 78' c Moefana 62' c Con: Smaili (6/6) 6', 14', 28', 54', 63', 79'	Report	Try: Blain (2) 31' m, 49' m Thompson 33' m McCallum 39' c Fraser 66' m Con: Thompson (1/5) 40'

Stade du Hameau, Pau
Referee: Christophe Ridley (England)

=== Week 4 ===
8 March 2019
19:15

Ireland	31–29	France (2 BP)
Try: Wycherley (2) 13' c, 59' c Reid 69' m Con: Healy (2/3) 14', 60'; Pen: Healy (4/4) 4', 32', 46', 55'	Report	Try: Gros 15' c Carbonel (2) 26' c, 64' m Viallard 79' c Con: Carbonel (3/4) 16', 27', 80'; Pen: Carbonel (1/1) 52'

Irish Independent Park, Cork
Attendance: 8,008
Referee: Craig Maxwell-Keys (England)

8 March 2019
19:30

(1 BP) Scotland	27–20	Wales (1 BP)
Try: Boyle 6' m McCallum 15' c McMichael 38' c Blain 50' m Con: Thompson (2/4) 16', 39'; Pen: Thompson (1/1) 48'	Report	Try: Griffiths 76' c Costelow 80' c Con: Costelow (1/1) 77'; Evans (1/1) 80'+1; Pen: Evans (2/2) 30', 35'

Meggetland, Edinburgh
Attendance: 2,473
Referee: Joy Neville (Ireland)

8 March 2019
19:45

(1 BP) England	35–10	Italy
Try: Seabrook 5' c Wilkinson 38' m Fox 49' c Sleightholme 57' c Con: Wilkinson (1/1) 6'; Hodge (2/2) 50', 58'; Pen: Hodge (2/2) 41', 51'; Vunipola (1/1) 67'	Report	Try: Mori 12' m Peruzzo 36' m

Goldington Road, Bedford
Referee: Nikoloz Amashukeli (Georgia)

=== Week 5 ===
15 March 2019
18:00

(2 BP) Italy	31–35	France (1 BP)
Try: Trulla 5' m Marinello (2) 55' m, 61' c Mba (2) 71' c, 80'+6 c Con: Garbisi (1/2) 62' da Re (2/3) 71', 80'+7	Report	Try: Viallard 26' c Lemardelet 37' c Pinto 42' c Dumortier 44' c Moefana 69' c Con: Smaili (5/5) 27', 38', 43', 45', 70'

Stadio Pozzi La Marmora, Biella
Referee: Ben Blain (Scotland)

15 March 2019
19:05

Wales	17–26	Ireland (1 BP)
Try: Owen 11' c Morgan 59' c Con: Evans (2/2) 12', 60'; Pen: Evans (1/3) 30'	Report	Try: Wren 39' c Tierney-Martin 47' c Reilly 72' m Clarkson 80' c Con: Healy (2/2) 40', 48'; Flannery (1/2) 80'+1

Eirias Stadium, Colwyn Bay
Referee: Christophe Ridley (England)

15 March 2019
19:45

(1 BP) England	45–7	Scotland
Try: de Glanville 11' c Willis 40'+3 m Hinkley 56' c Redpath 65' c Petch 70' c Barbeary 76' m Reed 80' c Con: Vunipola (5/7) 12', 57', 66', 71', 80'+1	Report	Try: Anderson 7' c Con: Thompson (1/1) 8'

Franklin's Gardens, Northampton
Referee: Sean Gallagher (Ireland)

== Player statistics ==
=== Top points scorers ===
Pos	Name	Team	Pts
1	Harry Byrne	Ireland	36
2	Louis Carbonel	France	33
3	Cai Evans	Wales	31
4	Ben Healy	Ireland	22
4	Mathieu Smaili	France	22
5	Paolo Garbisi	Italy	20
5	Dylan Tierney-Martin	Ireland	20

=== Top try scorers ===
Pos	Name	Team	Tries
1	Dylan Tierney-Martin	Ireland	4
2	Taine Basham	Wales	3
2	Jack Blain	Scotland	3
2	Connor Boyle	Scotland	3
2	Jordan Joseph	France	3
2	Michael Mba	Italy	3
2	Vincent Pinto	France	3
2	Jacopo Trulla	Italy	3
2	Tom Willis	England	3

== See also ==
- 2019 Six Nations Championship
- 2019 Women's Six Nations Championship
