= 2012 Six Nations Under 20s Championship =

Rugby union competition

- Date: 3 February 2012 – 16 March 2012
- Countries: England; France; Ireland; Italy; Scotland; Wales

Tournament statistics
- Champions: England (3rd title)
- Triple Crown: England

The 2012 Six Nations Under 20s Championship was a rugby union competition held between February and March 2012. England won the tournament and the Triple Crown.

== Final table ==
Position	Nation	Games				Points				Table points
Position	Nation	Played	Won	Drawn	Lost	For	Against	Difference	Tries	Table points
1	England	5	4	0	1	169	40	+129	30	8
2	France	5	4	0	1	109	63	+46	11	8
3	Ireland	5	4	0	1	86	46	+40	7	8
4	Wales	5	2	0	3	89	125	−36	8	4
5	Scotland	5	1	0	4	59	160	−101	6	2
6	Italy	5	0	0	5	60	138	−78	7	0

=== Results ===
==== Round one ====
3 February 2012
19:30

Scotland	3–59	England
Pen: Leonard 2'		Try: Yarde (3) 10', 19', 25'; Clifford (2) 14', 66'; Penalty try 38'; Watson 56'; Walker (2) 72', 76'; Con: Ford 10', 14', 38', 56', 66', 72', 76'

Firhill Stadium

3 February 2012
19:05

Ireland	11–6	Wales
Try: Layden 26'; Drop: Jackson 70'; McGrath 72'		Pen: Williams 66'; Drop: Davies 19'

Dubarry Park

18 February 2012
14:00

France	19–5	Italy
Try: Taofifenua 30'; Payen 44'; Jedreziak 78'; Con: Escande 31'; Selponi 78'		Try: Riccioli 71'

Stade Pierre Rajon

==== Round two ====
10 February 2012
19:05

Wales	28–15	Scotland
Try: R. Jones 12'; Morgan 31', 62'; Con: Davies 31', 62'; Pen: Davies 9', 26', 46'		Try: Farndale 69', 74'; Con: Leonard 74'; Pen: Leonard 16'

Eirias Stadium

11 February 2012
14:15

France	12–13	Ireland
Pen: Otazo 2', 8', 47', 54'		Try: Horan 42'; Con: Jackson 42'; Pen: Jackson 20'; Hanrahan 72'

Stade des Alpes

3 March 2012
14:00

Italy	7–42	England
Try: Marazzi 38'; Con: Odiete 38'		Try: Hill 20'; Walker 25'; Robson (2) 32', 45'; Ransom 60'; Bassett 80'; Con: Slade (3) 20', 25', 32'; Bell (3) 45', 60', 80'

Stadio Comunale Mario Battaglini

==== Round three ====
24 February 2012
19:45

England	40–9	Wales
Try: J. Bassett 23'; A. Watson 29',69'; L. Cowan-Dickie 56'; S. Hill 60'; M. Yarde 75'; Con: T. Bell (2) 23', 56'; Pen: T. Bell (2) 38',53'		Pen: S. Davies (2) 34', 40'; Drop: S. Davies 15'

Twickenham Stoop

24 February 2012
19:30

Scotland	21–30	France
Try: Hidalgo-Clyne 40'; Sinclair 62'; Con: Leonard 40'; Pen: Leonard 25',28',56'		Try: Chateau 23'; Danty 31'; Domvo 35'; Placines 45'; Con: Ecochard 31',35'; Pen: Ecochard 10',75'

Netherdale

24 February 2012
19:05

Ireland	27–8	Italy
Try: Henderson 67'; Layden 77'; Con: Jackson 77'; Pen: Jackson 11', 17', 20', 40', 49'		Try: Morsellino 63'; Pen: Della Rossa 7'

Dubarry Park

==== Round four ====
9 March 2012
19:05

Ireland	26–0	Scotland
Try: Layden 3'; McGrath 63'; Conan 73'; Con: Jackson 64'; Pen: Jackson 13', 45', 46'

Dubarry Park

9 March 2012
19:10

Wales	30–23	Italy
Try: R. Evans 11'; Morgan 60', Baker 75'; Con: S. Davies 12'; J. Williams 61', 76'; Pen: S. Davies 19', 38', 42'		Try: Calabrese 5'; Sarto 35'; Con: Odiete 7', 36'; Pen: Apperley 10', 47', 67'

Eirias Stadium

10 March 2012
19:45

France	12–8	England
Pen: Ecochard 6', 23', 73', 79'		Try: Sisi 69'; Pen: Mills 2'

Stade de la Rabine

==== Round five ====
16 March 2012
19:30

England	20–9	Ireland
Try: A. Watson 1'; D. Robson 15'; M. Yarde 45'; Con: T. Heathcote 1'; Pen: T. Heathcote 29'		Pen: P. Jackson 8',32',61'

Adams Park

16 March 2012
19:35

Wales	16–36	France
Try: L. Morgan 56'; Con: S. Davies 56'; Pen: S. Davies 15', 35', 48'		Try: J. Poirot 7'br/> J. Kazubek 10'; É. Escande 40'; B. Fuster 51'; D. Domvo 78'; Con: É. Escande 7', 10', 40', 78'; Pen: É. Escande 4'

Eirias Stadium

16 March 2012
18:00

Italy	17–20	Scotland
Try: L. Sarto 7'; Pen: S. Apperley 35', 54', 60', 75'		Try: M. Bennett 76'; H. Leonard 80'; Con: H. Leonard 76', 80'; Pen: H. Leonard 32', 36'

Stade Calvisano, Brescia
