= 2008 Six Nations Under 20s Championship =

Rugby union competition

- Date: 1 February 2008 – 14 March 2008
- Countries: England; France; Ireland; Italy; Scotland; Wales

Tournament statistics
- Champions: England (1st title)
- Grand Slam: England (1st title)
- Triple Crown: England
- Matches played: 15
- Top try scorer: (England) Noah Cato (6)

The 2008 Six Nations Under 20s Championship was the first Six Nations Under 20s Championship, a rugby union competition for under-20 national teams, played between February and March 2008. This was the first competition of the new under-20s tournament, following the merger of the under-19 and under-21 tournaments. England won the tournament along with the Grand Slam and Triple Crown.

== Table ==
Position	Nation	Games				Points				Table points
Position	Nation	Played	Won	Drawn	Lost	For	Against	Difference	Tries	Table points
1	England	5	5	0	0	158	63	+95	21	10
2	Wales	5	4	0	1	106	73	+33	12	8
3	France	5	3	0	2	84	77	+7	10	6
4	Ireland	5	2	0	3	56	90	−24	3	4
5	Italy	5	1	0	4	54	99	−45	5	2
6	Scotland	5	0	0	5	56	111	−55	3	0

== Results ==
=== Round 1 ===
1 February 2008
19:30

Scotland	6–12	France

Falkirk Stadium, Falkirk

1 February 2008
19:35

Ireland	6–0	Italy

Dubarry Park, Athlone

1 February 2008
19:45

England	28–15	Wales

Kingsholm Stadium, Gloucester

=== Round 2 ===
8 February 2008
19:00

France	24–13	Ireland

Stade Jacques-Fouroux, Auch

8 February 2008
19:10

Wales	27–10	Scotland

Rodney Parade, Newport

9 February 2008
15:00

Italy	13–22	England

Stadio La Sciorba, Genoa

=== Round 3 ===
22 February 2008
19:10

Wales	33–13	Italy

Rodney Parade, Newport

22 February 2008
19:30

Ireland	17–12	Scotland

Dubarry Park, Athlone

22 February 2008
20:00

France	6–24	England

Stade des Alpes, Grenoble

=== Round 4 ===
7 March 2008
19:30

Scotland	15–41	England

Falkirk Stadium, Falkirk

7 March 2008
19:35

Ireland	6–11	Wales

Dubarry Park, Athlone

8 March 2008
15:00

Italy	14–26	France

Porto-Vecchio

=== Round 5 ===
14 March
19:10

Wales	20–16	France

Rodney Parade, Newport

14 March
19:30

Italy	14–13	Scotland

Stadio Comunale, Mogliano Veneto

14 March
19:35

England	43–14	Ireland

Kingsholm Stadium, Gloucester

== Top try scorers ==
Noah Cato (ENG) – 6

Leigh Halfpenny (WAL) – 3

Zagar, Bastareaud (both FRA), Strain (SCO), Stegmann, Ellis, Cox, Eves (all ENG) – 2
