= 2011 Six Nations Under 20s Championship =

Rugby union competition

- Date: 4 February 2011 – 18 March 2011
- Countries: England; France; Ireland; Italy; Scotland; Wales

Tournament statistics
- Champions: England (2nd title)
- Grand Slam: England
- Triple Crown: England

The 2011 Six Nations Under 20s Championship was a rugby union competition held between February and March 2011. England won the tournament along with the Grand Slam and the Triple Crown.

== Final table ==
Position	Nation	Games				Points				Table points
Position	Nation	Played	Won	Drawn	Lost	For	Against	Difference	Tries	Table points
1	England	5	5	0	0	221	54	+167		10
2	France	5	4	0	1	149	62	+87		8
3	Wales	5	2	1	2	147	99	+48		5
4	Ireland	5	2	1	2	97	119	−22		5
5	Italy	5	1	0	4	39	180	−141		2
6	Scotland	5	0	0	5	23	162	−139		0

== Results ==
=== Round one ===
4 February 2011
18:00

France	49–5	Scotland

Stade de Venoix

4 February 2011
18:00

Italy	9–28	Ireland

Stadio XXV Aprile

5 February 2011
18:30

Wales	20–26	England

Parc y Scarlets

=== Round two ===
11 February 2011
19:30

England	74–3	Italy

Recreation Ground

11 February 2011
19:30

Scotland	3–33	Wales

Bridgehaugh Park

11 February 2011
19:45

Ireland	13–38	France

Dubarry Park

=== Round three ===
25 February 2011
18:00

Italy	15–46	Wales

Stadio San Vito-Gigi Marulla

25 February 2011
19:30

Scotland	0–15	Ireland

Tulloch Stadium

27 February 2011
15:15

England	19–8	France

Sixways Stadium

=== Round four ===
11 March 2011
18:00

Italy	3–25	France

Stadio San Michele

11 March 2011
19:10

Wales	26–26	Ireland

Parc y Scarlets

11 March 2011
20:00

England	56–8	Scotland

Newbury RFC

=== Round five ===
18 March 2011
19:30

France	29–22	Wales

Stadium Municipal d'Albi

18 March 2011
19:30

Scotland	7–9	Italy

Bridgehaugh Park

18 March 2011
19:45

Ireland	15–46	England

Dubarry Park
