= 2014 Six Nations Under 20s Championship =

Rugby union competition

- Date: 31 January 2014 – 14 March 2014
- Countries: England; France; Ireland; Italy; Scotland; Wales

Tournament statistics
- Champions: France (2nd title)
- Grand Slam: France
- Triple Crown: England

The 2014 Six Nations Under 20s Championship was a rugby union competition held in January, February and March 2014. France won the tournament and the Grand Slam while England won a Triple Crown.

== Final table ==
Position	Nation	Games				Points				Table points
Position	Nation	Played	Won	Drawn	Lost	For	Against	Difference	Tries	Table points
1	France	5	5	0	0	112	51	+61		10
2	England	5	4	0	1	215	57	+158		8
3	Wales	5	3	0	2	102	107	–5		6
4	Ireland	5	2	0	3	74	79	–5		4
5	Italy	5	1	0	4	46	143	–97		2
6	Scotland	5	0	0	5	63	175	–112		0

== Results ==
=== Round 1 ===
31 January 2014
19:05

Ireland	34–7	Scotland

Dubarry Park, Athlone

31 January 2014
19:10

Wales	26–9	Italy

Eirias Stadium, Colwyn Bay

31 January 2014
20:55

France	21–15	England

Stade Leo Lagrange, Besançon

=== Round 2 ===
7 February 2014
19:30

Scotland	15–48	England

Netherdale, Galashiels

7 February 2014
19:35

Ireland	0–16	Wales

Dubarry Park, Athlone

8 February 2014
20:55

France	34–0	Italy

Alfred Armandie, Agen

=== Round 3 ===
21 February 2014
19:00

Italy	32–13	Scotland

Stadio Omero Tognon, Fontanafredda

22 February 2014
18:05

Wales	10–16	France

Eirias Stadium, Colwyn Bay

22 February 2014
18:15

England	33–9	Ireland

Franklin's Gardens, Northampton

=== Round 4 ===
7 March 2014
19:05

Ireland	18–0	Italy

Dubarry Park, Athlone

7 March 2014
19:30

Scotland	13–18	France

Netherdale, Galashiels

7 March 2014
19:45

England	67–7	Wales

Kingston Park, Newcastle

=== Round 5 ===
14 March 2014
19:00

Italy	5–52	England

Stadio Peroni, Calvisano

14 March 2014
19:00

Wales	43–15	Scotland

Eirias Stadium, Colwyn Bay

14 March 2014
20:55

France	23–13	Ireland

Maurice Trelut, Tarbes
