= 2010 Six Nations Under 20s Championship =

Rugby union competition

- Date: 5 February 2010
- Countries: England; France; Ireland; Italy; Scotland; Wales

Tournament statistics
- Champions: Ireland (1st title)
- Triple Crown: Ireland
- Top try scorers: (Ireland) Hudson (Ireland) Conway (Wales) Fish all scored four

The 2010 Six Nations Under 20s Championship was a rugby union competition held between February and March 2010. Ireland won the tournament and the Triple Crown but no team won the Grand Slam.

== Final table ==
Position	Nation	Games				Points				Table points
Position	Nation	Played	Won	Drawn	Lost	For	Against	Difference	Tries	Table points
1	Ireland	5	4	0	1	147	62	+85	17	8
2	England	5	4	0	1	141	88	+53	15	8
3	Wales	5	3	0	2	124	107	+17	15	6
4	France	5	2	1	2	94	119	−25	11	5
5	Scotland	5	1	1	3	59	115	−56	6	3
6	Italy	5	0	0	5	54	128	−74	3	0

== Results ==
=== Round one ===
5 February 2010
19:30

Scotland	8–8	France

Tulloch Caledonian Stadium

5 February 2010
19:35

Ireland	39–0	Italy

Dubarry Park

5 February 2010
19:45

England	41–14	Wales

Gloucester RFC

=== Round two ===
12 February 2010
19:00

Italy	10–16	England

Stadio Comunale, San Donà di Piave

12 February 2010
19:05

Wales	20–12	Scotland

Cardiff Arms Park

12 February 2010
19:45

France	20–15	Ireland

Mazamet

=== Round three ===
26 February 2010
15:30

Wales	43–8	France

Cardiff Arms Park

27 February 2010
14:00

Italy	16–18	Scotland

Stadio Santa Rosa, Capoterra

27 February 2010
19:45

England	10–25	Ireland

Gloucester RFC

=== Round four ===
12 March 2010
19:00

Scotland	6–27	England

Firhill Stadium

12 March 2010
19:35

Ireland	24–17	Wales

Dubarry Park

12 March 2010
19:45

France	25–6	Italy

Stade des Alpes

=== Round five ===
19 March 2010
19:35

Ireland	44–15	Scotland

Dubarry Park

19 March 2010
20:05

Wales	30–22	Italy

Cardiff Arms Park

21 March 2010
14:00

France	33–47	England

Saint Nazaire

== Top try-scorers ==
Hudson, Conway (both IRE), Fish (WAL) – 4 tries

Spence (IRE), Phillips, Loxton (both WAL) – 3 tries

Marler, May, Watson (all ENG), Bales, Dupont (both FRA), Brown (SCO) – 2 tries
