= 2016 Six Nations Under 20s Championship =

Rugby union competition

- Date: 5 February 2016 – 18 March 2016
- Countries: England; France; Ireland; Italy; Scotland; Wales

Tournament statistics
- Champions: Wales (1st title)
- Grand Slam: Wales
- Triple Crown: Wales

The 2016 Six Nations Under 20s Championship was a rugby union competition held in February and March 2016. Wales won the tournament, the Triple Crown and the Grand Slam.

== Final table ==
Position	Nation	Games				Points				Table points
Position	Nation	Played	Won	Drawn	Lost	For	Against	Difference	Tries	Table points
1	Wales	5	5	0	0	146	71	+75		10
2	France	5	4	0	1	161	70	+91		8
3	Ireland	5	3	0	2	108	120	–12		6
4	Scotland	5	2	0	3	102	100	2		4
5	England	5	1	0	4	101	140	–39		2
6	Italy	5	0	0	5	43	160	–117		0

== Results ==
=== Round 1 ===
5 February 2016
19:35

Ireland	24–35	Wales

Energia Park, Donnybrook, Dublin

5 February 2016
20:00

Scotland	24–6	England

Broadwood Stadium, Cumbernauld
Referee: Andrew Brace (IRFU)

5 February 2016
21:00

France	40–3	Italy

Stade Pre-Fleuri, Nevers

=== Round 2 ===
12 February 2016
18:30

Wales	18–15	Scotland

Eirias Stadium, Colwyn Bay

12 February 2016
19:10

Italy	7–42	England

Stadio Mario e Romolo Pacifici, Venice
Referee: Lloyd Linton (SRU)

12 February 2016
21:05

France	34–13	Ireland

Parc des Sports (l'Egassiarial), Narbonne

=== Round 3 ===
26 February 2016
18:05

England	20–26	Ireland

Kingston Park, Newcastle

26 February 2016
19:10

Italy	14–24	Scotland

Stadio Plebiscito, Padova

27 February 2016
19:45

Wales	16–10	France

Eirias Stadium, Colwyn Bay

=== Round 4 ===
11 March 2016
19:35

Ireland	19–13	Italy

Energia Park, Donnybrook, Dublin

11 March 2016
19:45

England	16–42	Wales
Try: Sam Smith; Con: Mat Protheroe; Pen: Mat Protheroe		Try: Shaun Evans; Harri Millard; Keelan Giles (2); Dan Jones; Harrison Keddie; Con: Dan Jones (6)

Ashton Gate, Bristol
Referee: Andrew Brace (IRFU)

11 March 2016
20:00

Scotland	21–36	France

Broadwood Stadium, Cumbernauld

=== Round 5 ===
18 March 2016
18:45

France	41–17	England

Stade du Hameau, Pau

18 March 2016
19:05

Wales	35–6	Italy

Eirias Stadium, Colwyn Bay

18 March 2016
19:35

Ireland	26–18	Scotland

Energia Park, Donnybrook, Dublin
