= 2009 Six Nations Under 20s Championship =

Rugby union competition

- Date: 6 February 2009 – 20 March 2009
- Countries: England; France; Ireland; Italy; Scotland; Wales

Tournament statistics
- Champions: France (1st title)
- Top try scorers: (France) Doumayrou (England) Trinder (England) Lowe (Italy) Venditti all scored three

The 2009 Six Nations Under 20s Championship was a rugby union competition held between February and March 2009. France won the tournament but no team won the Grand Slam or Triple Crown.

== Final Table ==
Position	Nation	Games				Points				Table points
Position	Nation	Played	Won	Drawn	Lost	For	Against	Difference	Tries	Table points
1	France	5	4	0	1	150	53	+97	16	8
2	Ireland	5	4	0	1	86	88	−2	5	8
3	England	5	3	0	2	94	72	+22	14	6
4	Scotland	5	3	0	2	76	97	−21	5	6
5	Wales	5	1	0	4	93	109	−16	10	2
6	Italy	5	0	0	5	57	137	−80	6	0

== Results ==
=== Round one ===
6 February 2009
19:10

Scotland	18–17	Wales

McDiarmid Park

6 February 2009
19:35

Ireland	9–6	France

Dubarry Park

6 February 2009
20:00

England	17–0	Italy

Sixways Stadium

=== Round two ===
13 February 2009
19:00

France	30–3	Scotland

Chalon

13 February 2009
19:10

Wales	16–28	England

The Brewery Field

14 February 2009
15:00

Italy	23–29	Ireland

Stadio Beltrametti

=== Round three ===
27 February 2009
18:15

Ireland	19–18	England

Dubarry Park

27 February 2009
19:30

Scotland	14–10	Italy

Dens Park

28 February 2009
14:00

France	40–20	Wales

Strasbourg

=== Round four ===
13 March 2009
19:30

Scotland	35–20	Ireland

McDiarmid Park

13 March 2009
20:00

England	11–31	France

Sixways Stadium

13 March 2009
20:00

Italy	14–34	Wales

Biella

=== Round five ===
20 March 2009
19:00

Italy	10–43	France

Stadio Comunale Guido Angelini

20 March 2009
19:05

Wales	6–9	Ireland

Parc y Scarlets

20 March 2009
20:00

England	20–6	Scotland

Sixways Stadium

== Top try-scorers ==
Doumayrou (FRA), Trinder, Lowe (both ENG), Venditti (ITA) - 3 tries

Lapandry, Camara, Fall (all FRA), Phillips, Tipuric, Reynolds (all WAL) - 2 tries
