= Antonin Berruyer =

French rugby union player

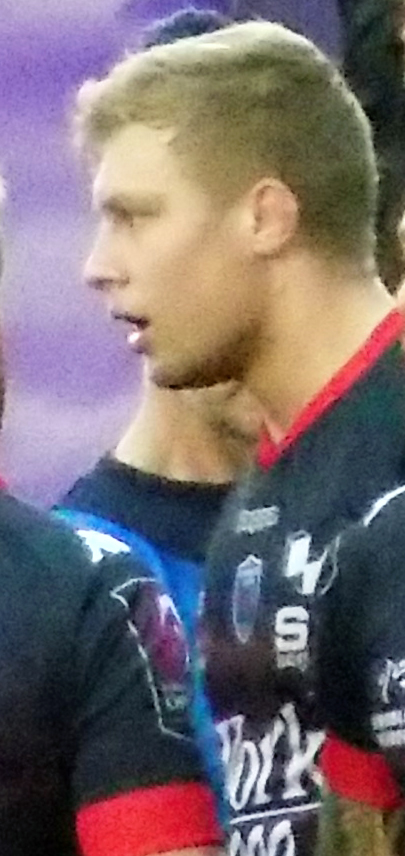
- Born: 8 September 1998 (age 28)
- Height: 1.87 m (6 ft 1 1/2 in)
- Weight: 96 kg (15.1 st; 212 lb)

Rugby union career
- Position(s): flanker, back row
Youth career
- 2003-2012: US Vinay
- 2012-2017: FC Grenoble
Senior career
Years	Team	Apps	(Points)
2017-	FC Grenoble	26	(10)
- Correct as of 13 January 2019
International career
Years	Team	Apps	(Points)
2018	France U20	6	(5)
- Correct as of 19 November 2018

Antonin Berruyer, born on 9 September 1998, is a French rugby union player who plays for FC Grenoble in the Top 14. His preferred position is flanker.

== Rugby career ==
Berruyer started playing rugby as a youth at US Vinay. His natural strength and athleticism saw interest from top 14 side, FC Grenoble. He made his professional debut for FC Grenoble in 2017 and has become a regular at the rear of the scrum for the French side.

=== France U20s ===
• Winner of the Six Nations Under 20s Championship with the France national under-20 side.
• Winner of the 2018 World Rugby Under 20 Championship in 2018 with the France national under-20 rugby union team.
