= Sacha Zegueur =

French rugby union player

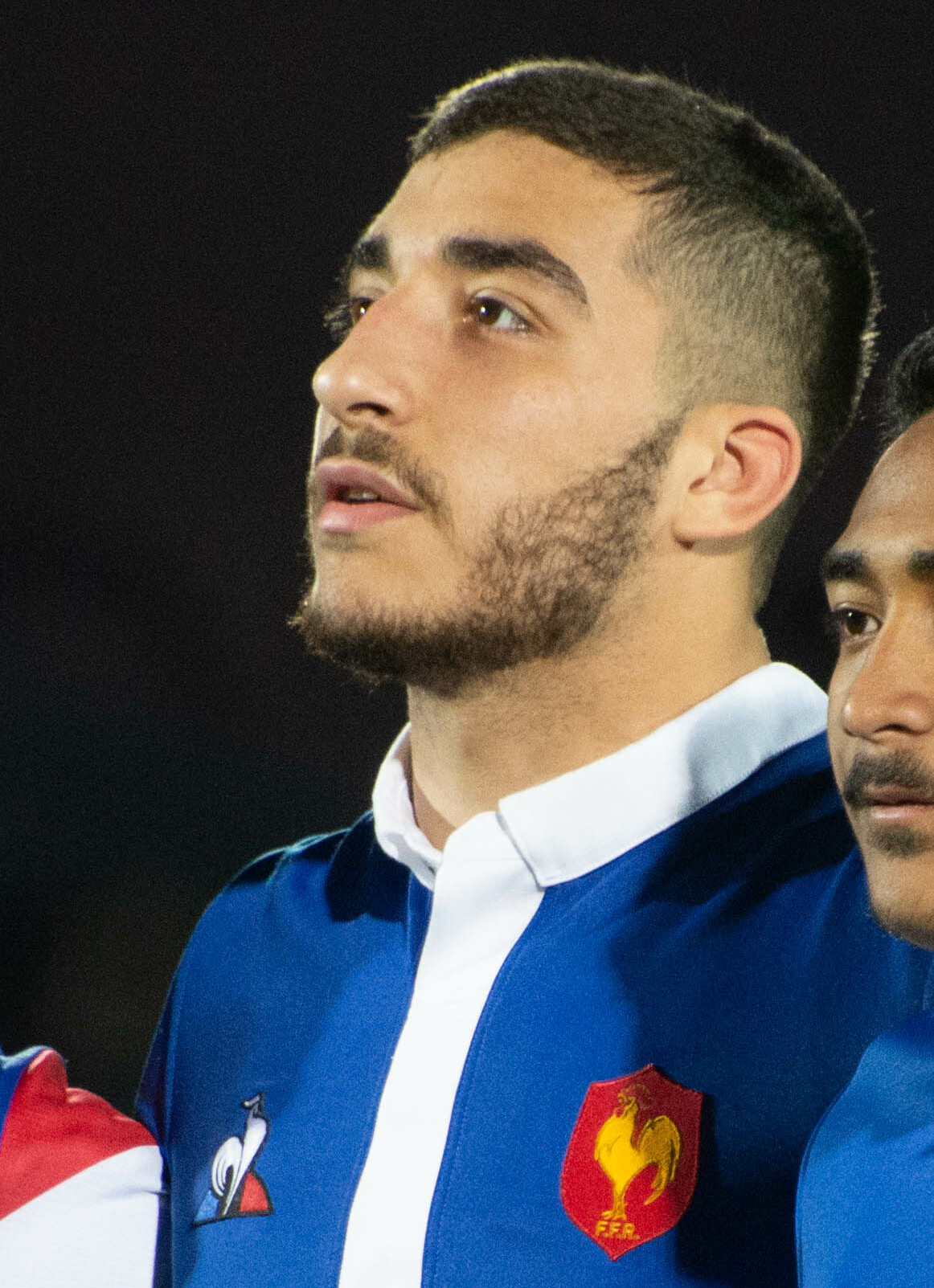
- Zegueur representing France during the Six Nations Under 20s Championship
- Born: 21 June 1999 (age 27) Oyonnax, France
- Height: 1.92 m (6 ft 4 in)
- Weight: 108 kg (238 lb; 17 st 0 lb)

Rugby union career
- Position(s): Flanker, Number 8
- Current team: Pau
Senior career
Years	Team	Apps	(Points)
2018–2022	Oyonnax	57	(15)
2022–	Pau	16	(5)
- Correct as of 4 March 2023
International career
Years	Team	Apps	(Points)
2018–2019	France U20	9	(5)
- Correct as of 4 March 2023

Sacha Zegueur (born 21 June 1999) is a French professional rugby union player who plays as a flanker for Top 14 club Pau.

== Early life ==
Sacha Zegueur was born on 21 June 1999 in Oyonnax, France where he grew up. He began playing rugby for his hometown club in 2010.

== Club career ==
On 31 August 2018, Zegueur made his professional debut for Oyonnax against Colomiers.

In October 2021, it was announced by multiple media sources that he will leave his club and join Pau at the end of the 2021–22 Pro D2 season. On 9 June 2022, the move was finally made official.

On 24 September, he played his first game for his new club and started as a blindside flanker under his former France U20 coach Sébastien Piqueronies.

== International career ==
In 2018, Zegueur won the Six Nations Under 20s Championship with France U20. A few months later, he was selected for the World Rugby Under 20 Championship and won the competition. He then won a back-to-back championship the year after.

On 22 November 2020, he received his first call-up to the France senior team for the Autumn Nations Cup after a Yacouba Camara's injury but he remained uncapped.

On 12 March 2023, he was called back to the national team for the 2023 Six Nations Championship game against England.

== Honours ==
France U20

- 2× World Rugby Under 20 Championship: 2018, 2019
- 1× Six Nations Under 20s Championship: 2018
