= Thibaut Hamonou =

French rugby union player (born 2004)

- Born: March 10, 2000 (age 26) Seclin, France
- Height: 1.93 m (6 ft 4 in)
- Weight: 108 kg (17 st 0 lb; 238 lb)

Rugby union career
- Position: Flanker
- Current team: Section Paloise
Youth career
- 2009–2013: Cahors Rugby
- 2013–2016: US Montauban
- 2016–2021: Stade Toulousain
Senior career
Years	Team	Apps	(Points)
2021–	Section Paloise	27	(5)
- Correct as of April 4, 2024
International career
Years	Team	Apps	(Points)
2018–2019	France U20	7	(0)
- Correct as of April 4, 2024

Thibaut Hamonou (born March 10, 2000) is a French rugby union player who plays as a flanker for Section Paloise in the Top 14 competition. He made his Top 14 debut with his club on October 9, 2021.

== Playing career ==
Thibaut Hamonou, born in Seclin near Lille, began rugby in 2009 with Cahors Rugby. He then moved to US Montauban in 2013, where he spent three seasons before transferring to Stade Toulousain in 2016. In 2017, he became part of the club's training center and contributed to their victory as champions of France Espoirs in 2021.

=== Club career ===
==== Stade Toulousain (2017-2019) ====
In 2019, Hamonou signed his first professional contract with Toulouse, extending until June 2022.

==== Section Paloise (since 2021) ====
During the 2021–2022 season, he was loaned to Section Paloise in the Top 14. Hamonou made his professional debut in October 2021 against Stade Toulousain at the Stade Ernest-Wallon.

After the season, he opted to join Section Paloise permanently until 2025. Throughout his loan period, he participated in 6 Top 14 matches and 3 European Challenge Cup matches.

In the following season (2022–2023), Hamonou played 4 league matches and 4 Challenge Cup matches. He remained actively involved in the 2023 Supersevens season, reaching the final with Pau and securing second place.

=== International career ===
In 2019, he won the World Rugby U20 Championship with France. That same year, Hamonou represented France in the Six Nations Under 20s Championship.
