= 2026 Six Nations Under 20s Championship =

Under-20 rugby union competition

- Date: 6 February – 15 March 2026
- Countries: England; France; Ireland; Italy; Scotland; Wales

Tournament statistics
- Champions: France (5th title)
- Matches played: 15
- Top point scorers: (England) Finn Keylock (Ireland) Tom Wood (42 points each)
- Top try scorers: (Ireland) Christopher Barrett (Italy) Valerio Pelli (5 tries each)
- Official website: sixnationsrugby.com

The 2026 Six Nations Under 20s Championship is the 19th Six Nations Under 20s Championship, an annual northern hemisphere rugby union tournament contested by the under-20 men's national teams of England, France, Ireland, Italy, Scotland and Wales. France were the reigning champions, having won their fourth title in 2025 and their fifth in 2025, with a grand slam.

== Table ==
Pos	Team	Pld	W	D	L	PF	PA	PD	TF	TA	TB	LB	Pts
1	France	5	5	0	0	192	116	+76	30	16	5	0	25
2	Ireland	5	4	0	1	177	145	+32	25	22	4	0	20
3	England	5	3	0	2	138	112	+26	20	16	3	1	16
4	Wales	5	1	0	4	117	142	−25	14	22	2	2	8
5	Italy	5	1	0	4	91	148	−57	14	21	2	1	7
6	Scotland	5	1	0	4	114	166	−52	18	24	2	0	6

Updated to match(es) played on 16 March 2026. Source: Six Nations Rugby

Table ranking rules:

- Four match points are awarded for a win.
- Two match points are awarded for a draw.
- A bonus match point is awarded to a team that scores four or more tries in a match or loses a match by seven points or fewer. If a team scores four tries in a match and loses by seven points or fewer, they are awarded both bonus points.
- Three bonus match points are awarded to a team that wins all five of their matches (known as a Grand Slam). This ensures that a Grand Slam winning team reaches a minimum of 23 points, and thus always ranks over a team who won four matches in which they also were awarded four try bonus points and were also awarded two bonus points (a try bonus and a losing bonus) in the match that they lost for a total of 22 points.
- Tie-breakers
  - If two or more teams are tied on match points, the team with the better points difference (points scored less points conceded) is ranked higher.
  - If the above tie-breaker fails to separate tied teams, the team that scored the higher number of total tries in their matches is ranked higher.
  - If two or more teams remain tied for first place at the end of the championship after applying the above tiebreakers, the title is shared between them.

== Fixtures ==
The fixtures for the tournament were announced on 15 October 2025.

=== Week 1 ===
6 February 2026
19:15

Italy	10–36	Scotland (1 BP)
Try: Coluzzi 58'; Con: Fasti 59'; Pen: Fasti 17'	Preview	Try: Moncrieff 3'; Roberts 27'; Kesterton 33'; Dalziel 47'; McHaffie 72'; Preston 76'; Con: McArthur (3) 28', 48', 73'

Stadio Comunale di Monigo, Treviso
Attendance: 3,136
Referee: Kevin Bralley (France)

6 February 2026
19:45

England	19–16	Wales (1 BP)
Try: Tongaʻuiha 44'; Staples 50'; Worsnip 74'; Con: Davidson 45'; Pater 75'	Preview	Try: Emanuel 31'; Con: Leggatt-Jones 32'; Pen: Leggatt-Jones (3) 3', 35', 39'

Franklin's Gardens, Northampton
Attendance: 7,351
Referee: Luke Rogan (United States)

7 February 2026
20:00

(1 BP) France	50–21	Ireland
Try: Drault 11'; Pargade 23'; Martin-Bonnard 26'; Latrasse 30'; Frisach 41'; Rates 51'; Andjisseramatchi 62'; Veschambre 80'; Con: Keletaona (5) 27', 32', 42', 52', 63'	Preview	Try: Barrett (2) 13', 48'; Neill 36'; Con: Wood (3) 14', 37', 49'

Stade Aimé Giral, Perpignan
Attendance: 6,812
Referee: Christopher Allison (South Africa)

=== Week 2 ===
13 February 2026
19:15

Scotland	17–33	England (1 BP)
Try: McArthur 27'; McHaffie 32'; Stewart 41'; Con: McArthur 33'	Preview	Try: Keylock 7'; Staples 21'; Treacey 36'; Pater 44'; Knight 72'; Con: Keylock (4) 22', 37', 45', 73'

Edinburgh Rugby Stadium
Attendance: 6,255
Referee: Ben Connor (Wales)

13 February 2026
19:45

(1 BP) Ireland	30–27	Italy (2 BP)
Try: Barrett 12'; Ryan 31'; Moloney 45'; Neill 59'; Con: Wood (2) 13', 59'; Pen: Wood (2) 2', 63'	Preview	Try: Rossi 19'; Pelli (2) 34', 54'; De Rossi 67'; Con: Braga (2) 20', 35'; Pen: Braga 40'

Musgrave Park, Cork
Attendance: 3,917
Referee: Luke Rogan (United States)

14 February 2026
20:00

Wales	24–34	France (1 BP)
Try: Davies 5'; Howe 15'; Emanuel 50'; Con: Leggatt-Jones (3) 6', 16', 51'; Pen: Leggatt-Jones 25'	Preview	Try: T. Keletaona 21'; L. Keletaona 29'; Senga 46'; Garault 66'; Cazemajou 75'; Con: L. Keletaona (3) 22', 47', 76'; Pen: L. Keletaona 42'

Cardiff Arms Park
Attendance: 4,824
Referee: Ru Campbell (Scotland)

=== Week 3 ===
20 February 2026
19:15

(1 BP) Wales	31–21	Scotland
Try: Evans 4'; Cutts 15'; Scott 52'; Howe 60'; Con: Lucas 61'; Pen: Leggatt-Jones (3) 7', 11', 41'	Preview	Try: Waugh 45'; Marshall 70'; Rennie 74'; Con: Dalziel (3) 46', 71', 74'

Cardiff Arms Park
Attendance: 4,966
Referee: George Selwood (England)

20 February 2026
19:45

England	21–31	Ireland (1 BP)
Try: Pearson 23'; Treacey 31'; Lilley 70'; Con: Keylock (2) 23', 32'; Davies 71'	Preview	Try: Fitzpatrick 10'; Neill 51'; Ryan 58'; Byrne 68'; Con: Wood (4) 11', 52', 59', 69'; Pen: O'Shea 75'

Recreation Ground, Bath
Attendance: 13,060
Referee: Morgan White (Hong Kong)

21 February 2026
20:00

(1 BP) France	32−17	Italy
Try: Andjisseramatchi 13'; Guillaud 17'; Tilloles 30'; Senga 51'; Marzullo 56'; Con: Kretchmann 18'; L. Keletaona 57'; Pen: L. Keletaona 60'	Preview	Try: Brasini 9'; Pelli 36'; Con: Braga (2) 10', 37'; Pen: Celi 49'

Stadium Lille Métropole, Villeneuve-d'Ascq
Attendance: 6,583
Referee: Saba Makharadze (Georgia)

=== Week 4 ===
6 March 2026
18:15

(1 BP) Scotland	26–45	France (1 BP)
	Preview

Edinburgh Rugby Stadium
Referee: Reuben Keane (Australia)

6 March 2026
19:15

Italy	17–37	England (1 BP)
	Preview

Stadio Comunale di Monigo, Treviso
Referee: Gonzalo de Achaval (Argentina)

7 March 2026
19:45

(1 BP) Ireland	48-33	Wales (1 BP)
	Preview

Musgrave Park, Cork
Referee: Kevin Bralley (France)

=== Week 5 ===
15 March 2026
13:00

(1 BP) Wales	13–20	Italy (1 BP)
	Preview

Rodney Parade, Newport
Referee: Gonzalo de Achaval (Argentina)

15 March 2026
15:15

(1 BP) Ireland	47–14	Scotland
	Preview

Musgrave Park, Cork
Referee: David Vosalevu (Fiji)

15 March 2026
17:45

(1 BP) France	31–28	England (2 BP)
	Preview

Stade Marcel-Deflandre, La Rochelle
Referee: Reuben Keane (Australia)

== See also ==
- 2026 Six Nations Championship
- 2026 Six Nations Women's U21 Series
