= Cormac Foley =

Irish rugby union player

- Born: 24 October 1999 (age 27) Newtownmountkennedy, Republic of Ireland
- Height: 1.80 m (5 ft 11 in)
- Weight: 85 kg (13.4 st; 187 lb)
- School: St Gerard's School

Rugby union career
- Position: Scrum-half
Senior career
Years	Team	Apps	(Points)
2021–	Leinster	23	(15)
2026	→ Ospreys		
- Correct as of 25 January 2025
International career
Years	Team	Apps	(Points)
2019	Ireland U20s	8	(10)
- Correct as of 25 April 2021

Cormac Foley (born 24 October 1999) is an Irish rugby union player, currently playing for United Rugby Championship and European Rugby Challenge Cup side Ospreys on loan from United Rugby Championship side Leinster Rugby. His preferred position is scrum-half.

== Leinster ==
Foley was named in the Leinster academy for the 2020–21 season. He made his Leinster debut in Round 11 of the Pro14 Rainbow Cup against Munster. Foley signed his first senior contract in 2022 joining from the Leinster academy.
