= Dubarry of Ireland =

Irish retail company

- Trade name: Dubarry of Ireland
- Type: Private
- Industry: Retail and premium footwear and clothing manufacturer.
- Founder: Ballinasloe, Chamber of Commerce.
- Headquarters: Ballinasloe, County Galway, Ireland
- Number of locations: 3 retail stores
- Area served: Worldwide
- Key people: Managing Director – E. Fagan
- Products: Deck shoes, country boots, sailing boots, tweed clothing, Gore-Tex lined footwear
- Services: Clothing, footwear, Repair, resoling
- Revenue: €27 million (2023)
- Website: www.dubarry.com

Dubarry of Ireland is an Irish-owned company producing footwear, clothing, leather goods and accessories. Established in 1937, Dubarry markets a range of sailing and country footwear and clothing for both women and men. This includes waterproof, Gore-Tex-lined performance sailing boots and leather deck shoes. In addition to its range of country lifestyle boots, Dubarry also has an extensive range of outerwear, knits and shirting in a wide variety of materials from tweed to Alpaca wool.

The headquarters of the company is at Ballinasloe, County Galway, Ireland. Over the years Dubarry has expanded its international sourcing network and now works closely with a select group of specialised production partners worldwide.

== History ==
Dubarry of Ireland was established in 1937 by the Cullen Family Trust, to provide local employment. Dubarry began trade by manufacturing quality shoes and named itself after Madame du Barry, a famous French courtesan to differentiate the brand from its Irish counterparts and give the brand a continental, European flavour. Information on the establishment of Dubarry by papers of the first chairman and managing director of Dubarry submitted by H.L.Cullen.

In November 2004, Dubarry ceased its manufacturing facility in Ballinasloe, transferring operations to Portugal where it has contract manufacturing partners. Dubarry justified its decision to relocate its entire production line to Portugal on high labour costs in Ireland. The company headquarters, however, as well as its product development, marketing and distribution departments, remain in Ballinasloe.

== Products ==
https://dubarry.com/collections/womens-footwear

=== Sailing boots ===
Dubarry developed a waterproof, fully breathable yachting boot called Shamrock. The current flagship offshore sailing boot, Crosshaven, was developed in consultation with the Volvo Ocean Race Irish entrant, Green Dragon, during 2008/09 round the world race.

=== Country boots ===
Dubarry's signature boot is the Galway boot which is popular and commonly worn by equestrian and other outdoor enthusiasts. The entire country boot range consists of leather boots. https://dubarry.com/collections/ladies-country-boots

=== Clothing ===
Dubarry launched their first clothing range in 2008 and it now includes waterproof and breathable GORE-TEX® jackets, Primaloft filled gilets, tweeds and leather accessories.

== Retail ==
The first Dubarry of Ireland flagship store was opened at 35 College Green, Dublin on 25 October 2012. On 2 October 2013, the second Dubarry flagship store opened its doors at 34 Duke of York Square, Chelsea, London.

Dubarry wholesale their country and coast collection of footwear, clothing and accessories to many department and speciality stores and also to individual retailers worldwide.

== Sponsorship ==
Dubarry sponsors the home stadium of Buccaneers Rugby Football Club, Dubarry Park, in Athlone, Ireland.

== Other ==
Dubarry's trademark deck shoe is part of the official uniform prescribed in several Dublin schools and unofficially part of the allowed uniform in others. The shoe is infamously worn on a regular basis by the satirical fictional Irish character Ross O'Carroll Kelly where he refers to the shoes as "Dubes".
