= Italy national under-20 rugby union team =

Italy under-20
- Union: Italian Rugby Federation
- Nickname: Azzurrini
- Coach: Andrea Di Giandomenico
Team kit	Change kit

First international
- Ireland 6-0 Italy (1 February 2008)

Largest win
- Italy 43-3 Scotland (1 July 2021)

Largest defeat
- South Africa 65–3 Italy (9 June 2009)

World Cup
- Appearances: 12 (First in 2008)
- Best result: 7th 2025

The Italy national under-20 rugby union team has competed in both the IRB Junior World Championship and IRB Junior World Rugby Trophy. They were one of four teams relegated in 2009 to the Junior World Trophy after finishing at the bottom of the tournament. They were again promoted to the 2011 IRB Junior World Championship after winning the 2010 IRB Junior World Rugby Trophy.

Italy finished in last place at the 2012 IRB Junior World Championship and had again been relegated to the Junior World Trophy for 2013. Then they won the 2013 IRB Junior World Rugby Trophy so Italy participated in the 2014 IRB Junior World Championship that was played in New Zealand.

Since 2008, its first edition, they participate in the Six Nations Under 20s Championship.

== Squad ==
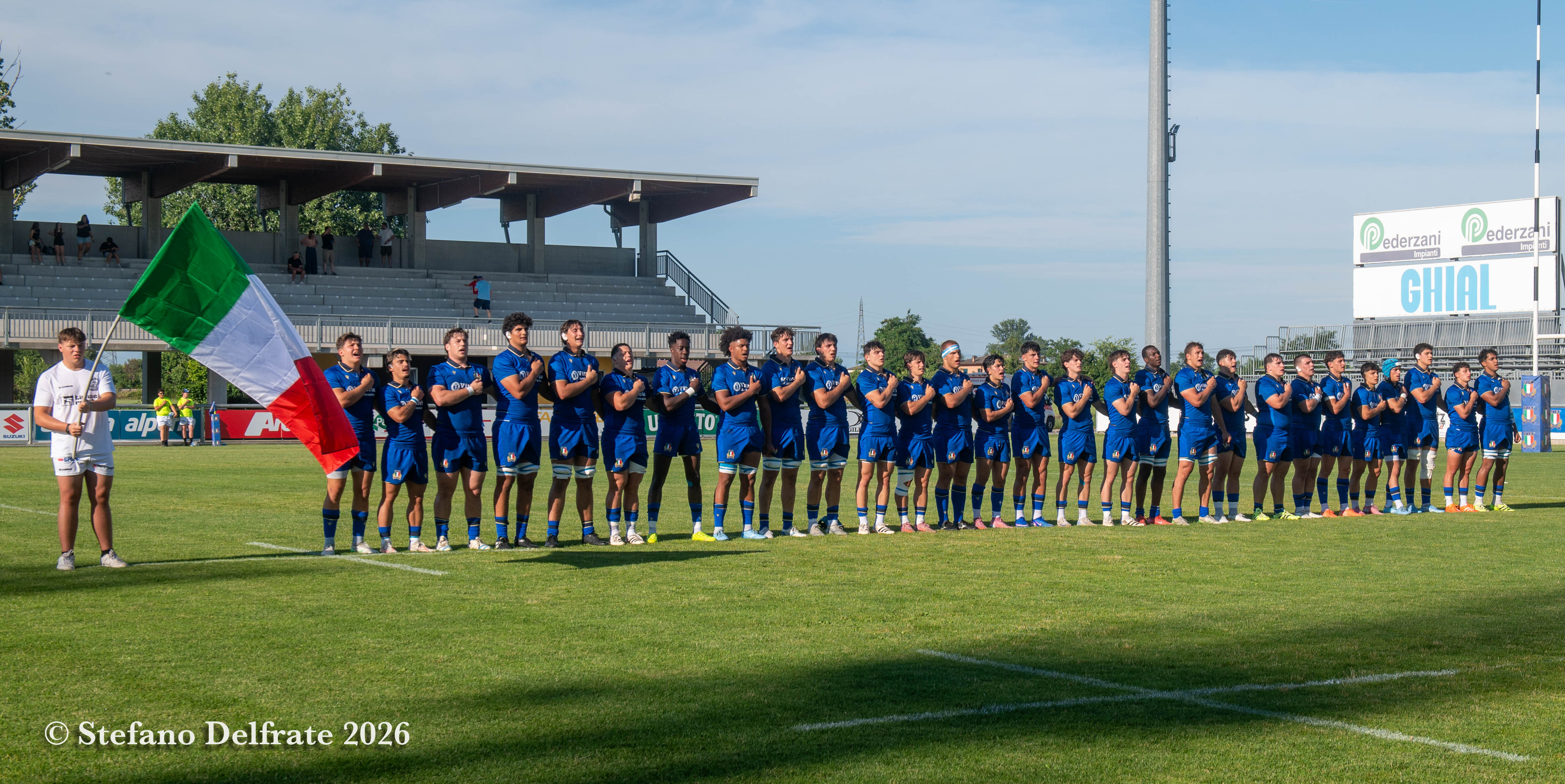
Italy U20s lineup against England U20s in 2026.

Squad to the 2026 Six Nations Under 20s Championship

=== Forwards ===
- Carlo Antonio Bianchi (Unione Rugby Firenze)*
- Gioele Boccato (Verona Rugby)*
- Christian Brasini (Livorno Rugby)*
- Ettore Dinarte (Valpolicella Rugby)*
- Simone Fardin (Rugby Casale)*
- Inza Dene (Piacenza Rugby Club)*
- Thomas Kurti (Valorugby Emilia)*
- Erik Meroi (Rugby Club Pasian di Prato)*
- Enoch Opoku-Gyamfi (Bath Rugby)
- Valerio Pelli (Mogliano Rugby)
- Antonio Reina (VII Rugby Torino)*
- Davide Sette (Rugby Experience L’Aquila)*
- Marco Spreafichi (Benetton Rugby)*
- Leonardo Tosi (Livorno Rugby)
- Jaheim Noel Wilson (Rugby Club Pasian di Prato)*

=== Backs ===
- Riccardo Casarin (Amatori&Union Rugby Milano)*
- Pietro Celi (Livorno Rugby)*
- Daniele Coluzzi (Colleferro Rugby)*
- Luca De Novellis (Pesaro Rugby)*
- Thomas Del Sureto (Fiamme Oro Rugby)*
- Malik Faissal (Zebre Parma)*
- Roberto Fasti (Benetton Rugby)*
- Tommaso Roda (Piacenza Rugby Club)*
- Luca Rossi (Pesaro Rugby)*
- Alessio Scaramazza (Rugby Experience L’Aquila)*
- Alessandro Teodosio (Fiamme Oro Rugby)*
- Nikolaj Varotto (Zebre Parma)*
- Edoardo Vitale (CUS Milano Rugby)*

=== Invited players ===
- Francesco Braga (Valpolicella Rugby)
- Giovanni Marzotto (Benetton Rugby)
- Giacomo Messori (Petrarca Rugby)
- Antony Italo Miranda (Mogliano Rugby)
- Luca Trevisan (Golden Lions)

^{*} denotes a player selected for the Accademia Nazionale I. Francescato

=== Management ===
- Andrea Di Giandomenico - Head coach
- Andrea Saccà - Team manager
- Michele Rizzo - Assistant coach
- Alessandro Troncon - Assistant coach
- Dario Valente- Video analyst
- Giovanni Biondi - Fitness coach

== Tournament record ==
Year	Tournament	Host	Rank	Result
2008	Junior World Championship	Wales	11th	
2009	Junior World Championship	Japan	13th	Relegated to 2010 IRB Junior World Rugby Trophy
2010	Junior World Trophy	Russia	1st	Promoted to 2011 IRB Junior World Championship
2011	Junior World Championship	Italy	11th	
2012	Junior World Championship	South Africa	12th	Relegated to 2013 IRB Junior World Rugby Trophy
2013	Junior World Trophy	Chile	1st	Promoted to 2014 IRB Junior World Championship
2014	Junior World Championship	New Zealand	11th	
2015	Junior World Championship	Italy	11th	
2016	Junior World Championship	England	11th	
2017	Junior World Championship	Georgia	8th	
2018	Junior World Championship	France	8th	
2019	Junior World Championship	Argentina	9th	
2020	Junior World Championship	Italy		Cancelled due to the COVID-19 pandemic.
2021	Junior World Championship			Cancelled due to the COVID-19 pandemic.
2022	-			Replaced with Six Nations Summer Series in Italy
2023	Junior World Championship	South Africa	11th	
2024	Junior World Championship	South Africa	10th	
2025	Junior World Championship	Italy	7th	

=== Six Nations Under 20s Championship ===
Year	Pos	Played	W	D	L	PF	PA	PD	TF	TA	TD	LBP	TBP	Table Points
2008	5th	5	1	0	4	54	99	–45	5			N/A	N/A	2
2009	6th	5	0	0	5	57	137	–80	6			N/A	N/A	0
2010	6th	5	0	0	5	54	128	-74	3			N/A	N/A	0
2011	5th	5	1	0	4	39	180	-141				N/A	N/A	2
2012	6th	5	0	0	5	60	138	-78	7			N/A	N/A	0
2013	6th	5	0	1	4	65	145	-80	8			N/A	N/A	1
2014	5th	5	1	0	4	46	143	–97				N/A	N/A	2
2015	6th	5	0	0	5	45	216	-170				N/A	N/A	0
2016	6th	5	0	0	5	43	160	-117				N/A	N/A	0
2017	6th	5	0	0	5	61	156	–95	8	21	–13	0	2	2
2018	4th	5	2	0	3	126	181	–55	17	27	–10	2	1	11
2019	5th	5	1	0	4	99	168	-69	15	22	-7	2	1	7
2020	Cancelled	3	1	0	2	65	68	-3	8	9	-1	1	1	8
2021	5th	5	1	0	4	102	98	+4	13	10	+3	1	2	7
2022	4th	5	3	0	2	87	113	-26	11	12	-1	1	0	13
2023	3rd	5	2	0	3	148	146	+2	24	18	+6	5	2	15
2024	4th	5	2	0	3	118	120	-2	16	17	-1	1	1	10
2025	4th	5	2	0	3	84	133	-49	12	21	-9	1	1	10
2026	5th	5	1	0	4	91	148	-57	18	24	-6	1	2	7

== F.I.R. Academy ==
During the regular season, many players of Under-20 are selected to play for F.I.R. Academy "Ivan Francescato" of Parma (from 2018 to 2020 in Remedello, Brescia). This team played in Italian Serie A, Pool A, until 2021-2021 season.
