= Jordan Joseph =

France international rugby union player (born 2000)

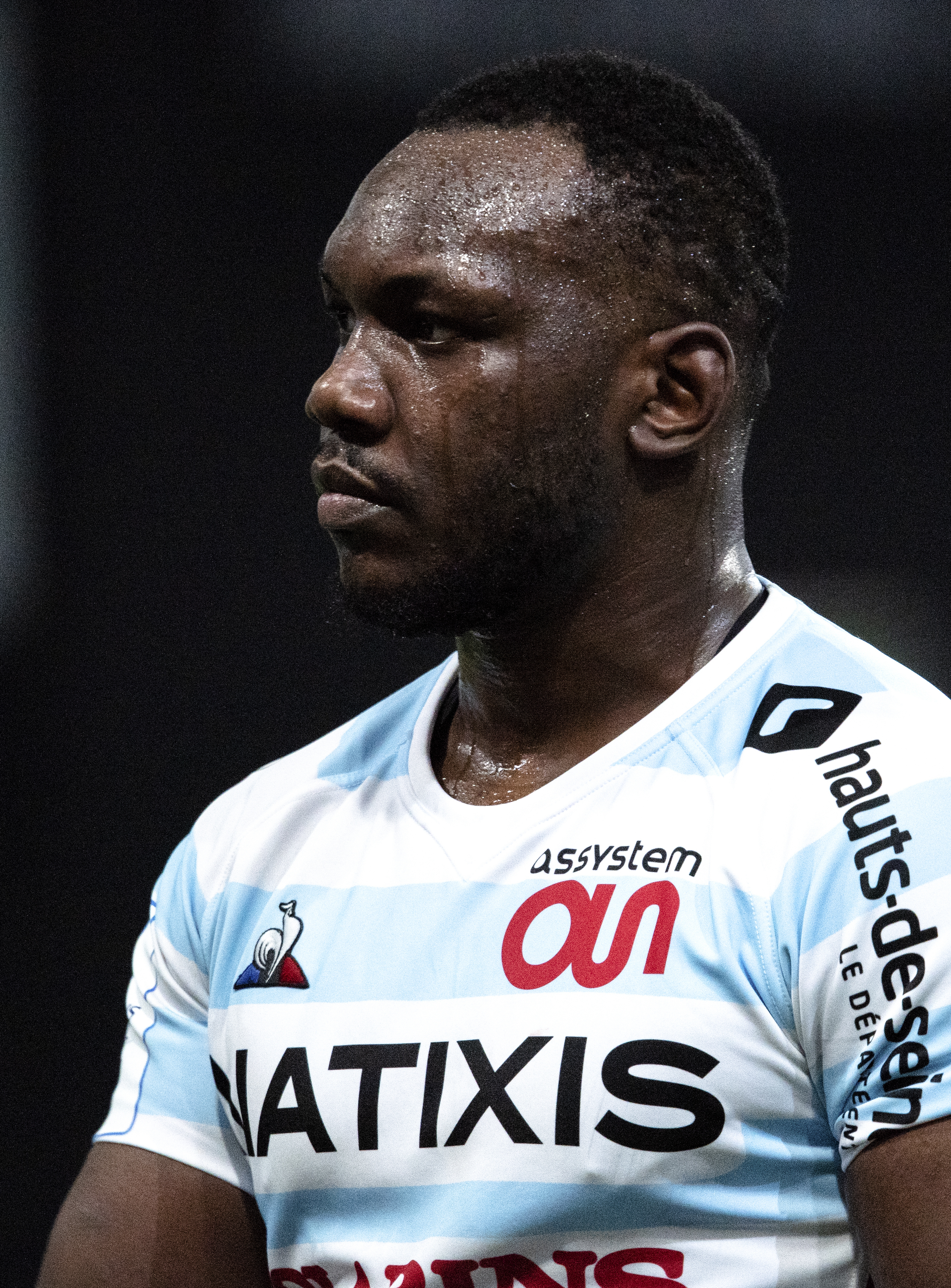
- Joseph playing for Racing 92 in 2019
- Born: Jordan Joseph; 31 July 2000 (age 26) Gonesse, France
- Height: 1.89 m (6 ft 2 1/2 in)
- Weight: 115 kg (254 lb; 18 st 2 lb)

Rugby union career
- Position: Back row
- Current team: Racing 92
Amateur team(s)
Years	Team	Apps	(Points)
2013–2014	AAS Sarcelles		
2014–2018	Massy		
Senior career
Years	Team	Apps	(Points)
2018–	Racing 92	81	(65)
2021–2023	→ Pau (loan)	35	(50)
- Correct as of 6 June 2025
International career
Years	Team	Apps	(Points)
2018–2020	France U20	18	(60)
2018	French Barbarians	1	(0)
2024–	France	2	(0)
- Correct as of 13 July 2024

Jordan Joseph (born 31 July 2000) is a French rugby union player. His position is in the back row.

== Personal life ==
Jordan is born in France of Haitian descent

== Honours ==
=== International ===
France (U20)

- World Rugby Under 20 Championship winners (2): 2018, 2019

=== Individual ===
- World Rugby Junior Player of the Year: 2018
