= Ireland national under-20 rugby union team =

Ireland U-20
- Union: Irish Rugby Football Union
- Emblem: Shamrock
- Ground: Musgrave Park (Capacity: 8,008)
- Coach: Andrew Browne
- Captain: Sami Bishti
- Most caps: Dominic Ryan (20); Iain Henderson (20)
- Top scorer: Sam Prendergast (142)
- Most tries: Andrew Conway (14)
| Team kit | Change kit |

First international
- Ireland 17–15 Wales (2 February 2007)

Largest win
- Scotland 7–82 Ireland (10 March 2023)

Largest defeat
- New Zealand 69–3 Ireland (8 June 2017)

World Cup
- Appearances: 13 (First in 2008)
- Best result: 2nd, 2016, 2023

The Ireland national under-20 rugby team was formed in 2006, having previously been known as the under-21 team. It participates principally in the Under-20 Six Nations Championship which it has won on five occasions and the World Rugby Under 20 Championship where it has finished as runner-up twice.

== History ==
Ireland Under-20's have won the Grand Slam four times and the Six Nations Championship five times: 2007(as the Under-21s) , 2010, 2019, 2022 and 2023. In the pandemic-truncated competition in 2020, Ireland won the Triple Crown. At the time the competition was halted, Ireland were undefeated and led the table. However, this was not considered a championship nor a grand slam.

Ireland won two consecutive Grand Slams in the 2022 and 2023 Six Nations championships, the only nation ever to do so at that point, but were denied a third consecutive Grand Slam and championship title following a final day draw away to England. Despite Ireland and England having both recorded four wins and a draw, England were crowned champions as they had earned one more try bonus point than Ireland.

Ireland Under-20's streak of fourteen consecutive Under 20-Six Nations victories (before the England match) and fifteen matches undefeated in the tournament over three seasons (after the match) are tournament records as of 2026; both streaks came to an end with defeat to England 3-19 in the first game of the 2024 tournament.

== Players ==
=== Current squad ===
Head coach Andrew Browne named his 29–man squad for the 2026 U20 Six Nations on 20 January 2026.

| Name | Date of birth | Position | Club | Province |
|---|---|---|---|---|
| Tyrese Abolarin | | Prop | Queen's University | (Ireland) Ulster |
| Sami Bishti (c) | | Prop | UCD | (Ireland) Leinster |
| Max Doyle | | Prop | UCD | (Ireland) Leinster |
| Christian Foley | | Prop | Young Munster | (Ireland) Munster |
| Blake McClean | | Prop | Instonians | (Ireland) Ulster |
| Jonathan Byrne | | Hooker | Garryowen | (Ireland) Munster |
| Rian Handley | | Hooker | Old Wesley | (Ireland) Leinster |
| Duinn Maguire | | Hooker | UCD | (Ireland) Leinster |
| Joe Finn | | Lock | Garryowen | (Ireland) Munster |
| Donnacha McGuire | | Lock | UCD | (Ireland) Leinster |
| Dylan McNeice | | Lock | UCD | (Ireland) Leinster |
| Sean Walsh | | Lock | Barnhall | (Ireland) Leinster |
| Ben Blaney | | Back-row | Terenure College | (Ireland) Leinster |
| Bill Hayes | | Back-row | Garryowen | (Ireland) Munster |
| Alex Lautsou | | Back-row | Shannon | (Ireland) Munster |
| Josh Neill | 28 February 2007 | Back-row | Old Wesley | (Ireland) Leinster |
| Diarmaid O'Connell | | Back-row | Corinthians | (Ireland) Connacht |
| Christopher Barrett | | Scrum-half | UCC | (Ireland) Munster |
| Luke Fogarty | | Scrum-half | Barnhall | (Ireland) Leinster |
| James O'Dwyer | | Scrum-half | Old Belvedere | (Ireland) Leinster |
| Charlie O'Shea | | Fly-half | UCC | (Ireland) Munster |
| Tom Wood | | Fly-half | Garryowen | (Ireland) Munster |
| Ethan Black | | Centre | Old Wesley | (Ireland) Leinster |
| Johnny O'Sullivan | | Centre | Dublin University | (Ireland) Leinster |
| Derry Moloney | 1 February 2006 | Wing | Blackrock College | (Ireland) Leinster |
| Harry Waters | | Wing | Blackrock College | (Ireland) Leinster |
| Daniel Ryan | | Wing | Corinthians | (Ireland) Connacht |
| Noah Byrne | | Fullback | Dublin University | (Ireland) Leinster |
| Charlie Molony | 16 March 2006 | Fullback | UCD | (Ireland) Leinster |

=== Award winners ===
The following Ireland U20s players have been recognised at the World Rugby Awards since 2008:

World Rugby Junior Player of the Year
| Year | Nominees | Winners |
|---|---|---|
| 2012 | JJ Hanrahan | — |
| 2014 | Garry Ringrose | — |
| 2016 | Max Deegan | Max Deegan |

== Overall record ==
| Opposition | Played | Won | Drawn | Lost | % Won | For | Aga | Diff |
|---|---|---|---|---|---|---|---|---|
| Argentina | 5 | 3 | 0 | 2 | 60% | 101 | 73 | +28 |
| Australia | 4 | 2 | 0 | 2 | 50% | 83 | 98 | –15 |
| England | 28 | 10 | 2 | 16 | 35.71% | 612 | 766 | –154 |
| Fiji | 3 | 3 | 0 | 0 | 100% | 131 | 30 | +101 |
| France | 25 | 11 | 0 | 14 | 44% | 496 | 595 | –99 |
| Georgia | 5 | 4 | 0 | 1 | 80% | 136 | 93 | +43 |
| Japan | 1 | 1 | 0 | 0 | 100% | 39 | 33 | +6 |
| Italy | 25 | 21 | 1 | 3 | 84% | 730 | 388 | +342 |
| New Zealand | 10 | 1 | 0 | 9 | 10% | 161 | 423 | –262 |
| Samoa | 3 | 2 | 0 | 1 | 66.67% | 92 | 45 | +47 |
| Scotland | 28 | 22 | 0 | 6 | 78.57% | 885 | 542 | +343 |
| South Africa | 6 | 2 | 0 | 4 | 33.33% | 136 | 193 | –57 |
| Spain | 1 | 1 | 0 | 0 | 100% | 38 | 37 | +1 |
| Tonga | 1 | 1 | 0 | 0 | 100% | 45 | 27 | +18 |
| Uruguay | 1 | 1 | 0 | 0 | 100% | 45 | 0 | +45 |
| Wales | 25 | 13 | 1 | 11 | 52% | 620 | 494 | +126 |
| Total | 171 | 98 | 4 | 69 | 57.31% | 4,350 | 3,837 | +513 |

Correct as of 20 July 2025

=== Six Nations Under 20s Championship ===
| Year | Pos | Played | W | D | L | PF | PA | PD | TF | TA | TD | LBP | TBP | Triple Crown | Grand Slam |
|---|---|---|---|---|---|---|---|---|---|---|---|---|---|---|---|
| 2008 | 4th | 5 | 2 | 0 | 3 | 56 | 90 | –34 | 3 | 13 | –10 | N/A | N/A | No | No |
| 2009 | 2nd | 5 | 4 | 0 | 1 | 86 | 88 | –2 | 5 | 9 | –4 | N/A | N/A | No | No |
| 2010 | 1st | 5 | 4 | 0 | 1 | 147 | 62 | 85 | 17 | 5 | 12 | N/A | N/A | Yes | No |
| 2011 | 4th | 5 | 2 | 1 | 2 | 147 | 99 | 48 | 11 | 14 | –3 | N/A | N/A | No | No |
| 2012 | 3rd | 5 | 4 | 0 | 1 | 86 | 46 | 40 | 7 | 4 | 3 | N/A | N/A | No | No |
| 2013 | 3rd | 5 | 2 | 1 | 2 | 98 | 83 | 15 | 13 | 9 | 4 | N/A | N/A | No | No |
| 2014 | 4th | 5 | 2 | 0 | 3 | 74 | 79 | –5 | 7 | 8 | –1 | N/A | N/A | No | No |
| 2015 | 5th | 5 | 2 | 0 | 3 | 120 | 90 | 30 | 13 | 10 | 3 | N/A | N/A | No | No |
| 2016 | 3rd | 5 | 3 | 0 | 2 | 108 | 120 | –18 | 10 | 12 | –2 | N/A | N/A | No | No |
| 2017 | 4th | 5 | 3 | 0 | 2 | 111 | 122 | –11 | 12 | 13 | –1 | 1 | 0 | No | No |
| 2018 | 3rd | 5 | 2 | 0 | 3 | 145 | 182 | –37 | 21 | 26 | –5 | 1 | 3 | No | No |
| 2019 | 1st | 5 | 5 | 0 | 0 | 150 | 92 | 58 | 18 | 12 | 6 | 0 | 3 | Yes | Yes |
| 2020 | Cancelled | 3 | 3 | 0 | 0 | 113 | 69 | 44 | 17 | 10 | 7 | 0 | 3 | Yes | Cancelled |
| 2021 | 3rd | 5 | 3 | 0 | 2 | 151 | 100 | 51 | 20 | 14 | 6 | 1 | 3 | No | No |
| 2022 | 1st | 5 | 5 | 0 | 0 | 210 | 65 | 145 | 29 | 9 | 20 | 0 | 4 | Yes | Yes |
| 2023 | 1st | 5 | 5 | 0 | 0 | 239 | 116 | 123 | 32 | 17 | 15 | 0 | 4 | Yes | Yes |
| 2024 | 2nd | 5 | 4 | 1 | 0 | 171 | 93 | 78 | 23 | 12 | 11 | 0 | 4 | No | No |
| 2025 | 6th | 5 | 1 | 0 | 4 | 72 | 91 | –19 | 11 | 12 | –1 | 1 | 1 | No | No |
| 2026 | 2nd | 5 | 4 | 0 | 1 | 177 | 145 | +32 | 25 | 22 | +3 | 4 | 0 | Yes | No |

=== World Rugby U20 Championship ===
| Year | Place | Pool | Played | W | D | L | PF | PA | PD | TF | TA | TD | LBP | TBP |
|---|---|---|---|---|---|---|---|---|---|---|---|---|---|---|
| (Wales) 2008 | 9th | A | 5 | 3 | 0 | 2 | 112 | 127 | –15 | 11 | 13 | –2 | 0 | 1 |
| (Japan) 2009 | 8th | A | 5 | 2 | 0 | 3 | 81 | 54 | 27 | 9 | 3 | 6 | 0 | 1 |
| (Argentina) 2010 | 9th | B | 5 | 2 | 0 | 3 | 154 | 118 | 36 | 18 | 9 | 9 | 2 | 0 |
| (Italy) 2011 | 8th | C | 5 | 1 | 0 | 4 | 120 | 183 | –63 | 11 | 24 | –13 | 0 | 0 |
| (South Africa) 2012 | 5th | B | 5 | 4 | 0 | 1 | 124 | 70 | 54 | 13 | 7 | 6 | 1 | 1 |
| (France) 2013 | 8th | B | 5 | 2 | 0 | 3 | 121 | 86 | 35 | 14 | 9 | 5 | 1 | 1 |
| (New Zealand) 2014 | 4th | B | 5 | 2 | 0 | 3 | 124 | 127 | –3 | 14 | 16 | –2 | 1 | 2 |
| (Italy) 2015 | 7th | C | 5 | 3 | 0 | 2 | 74 | 92 | –18 | 6 | 9 | –3 | 0 | 0 |
| (England) 2016 | 2nd | A | 5 | 4 | 0 | 1 | 173 | 153 | 20 | 17 | 16 | 1 | 0 | 1 |
| (Georgia (country)) 2017 | 9th | B | 5 | 2 | 0 | 3 | 128 | 167 | –39 | 16 | 25 | –9 | 2 | 0 |
| (France) 2018 | 11th | C | 5 | 1 | 0 | 4 | 129 | 158 | –29 | 16 | 23 | –7 | 2 | 0 |
| (Argentina) 2019 | 8th | B | 5 | 2 | 0 | 3 | 137 | 155 | –18 | 18 | 20 | –2 | 0 | 2 |
| 2020–2022 | Not held due to the COVID-19 pandemic. | | | | | | | | | | | | | |
| (South Africa) 2023 | 2nd | B | 5 | 3 | 1 | 1 | 156 | 133 | 23 | 23 | 19 | 4 | 0 | 3 |
| (South Africa) 2024 | 4th | B | 4* | 2 | 0 | 2 | 121 | 100 | 21 | 17 | 12 | 5 | 0 | 1 |
| (Italy) 2025 | 11th | C | 5 | 2 | 0 | 3 | 132 | 173 | –41 | 19 | 26 | –7 | 2 | 2 |
*The 2024 World Rugby U20 Championship Pool B match between Ireland and Australia was cancelled due to weather conditions, rendering the pitch unplayable and unsafe. Both teams were awarded two points.

== Honours ==
- Six Nations Under 20s Championship:
  - Winner (5): 2007, 2010, 2019, 2022, 2023
- Grand Slam:
  - Winner (4): 2007, 2019, 2022, 2023
- Triple Crown:
  - Winner (7): 2007, 2010, 2019, 2020, 2022, 2023, 2026
- World Rugby Under 20 Championship:
  - Runner Up (2): 2016, 2023

== See also ==
- Ireland national rugby union team
- Ireland Wolfhounds
- Emerging Ireland
- Ireland national schoolboy rugby union team
- Six Nations Under 20s Championship
- World Rugby Under 20 Championship
