= Eirias Stadium =

Rugby and music venue in Colwyn Bay, north Wales

Stadiwm Eirias
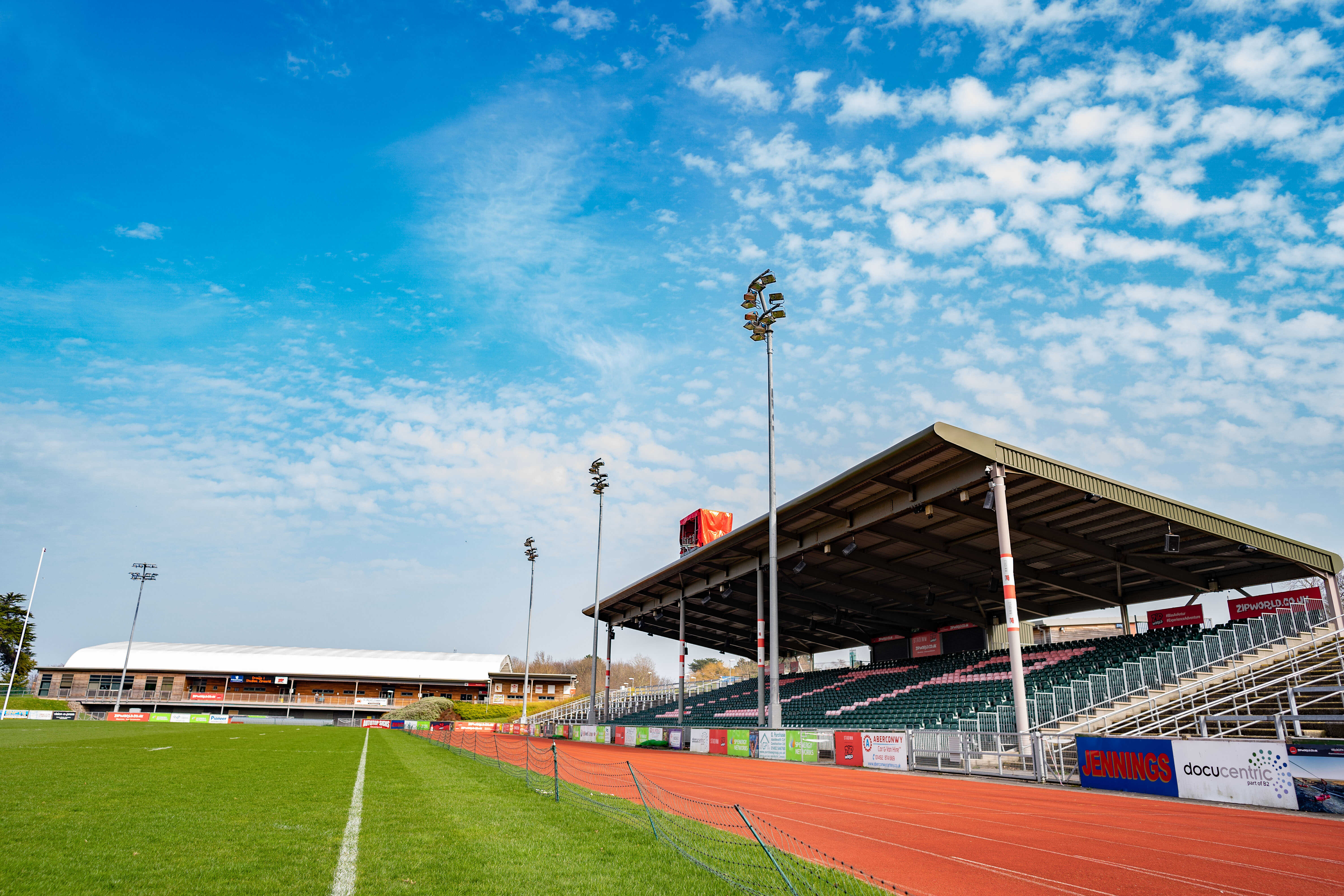
- Eirias Stadium, south stand
- Interactive map of Stadiwm Eirias
- Former names: Stadiwm Zip World (2017–2022) Stadiwm CSM ( 2023 - 2025)
- Location: Colwyn Bay, Wales
- Coordinates: 53°17′28″N 3°42′46″W
- Owner: Conwy County Borough Council
- Operator: Conwy County Borough Council
- Capacity: 6,080 (Sporting events); 15,000 (Concerts)
- Surface: Grass
- Field size: 123 m × 76 m (404 ft × 249 ft)

Construction
- Opened: June 1955
- Renovated: 1987, 2011

Tenants
- Rugby Union; RGC 1404 (2009–present); Wales national under-20 rugby union team (2012–2024); Rugby League; North Wales Crusaders (2021–present); Football; Colwyn Bay F.C. (1983–1984); Athletics; Colwyn Bay Athletic Club

Eirias Stadium (Welsh: Stadiwm Eirias), is a multi-purpose stadium that is part of the outdoor complex of the Eirias Events Centre in Eirias Park, Colwyn Bay, Wales. It is home to the Principality Premiership team, RGC 1404 and RFL Championship team North Wales Crusaders. The stadium had been used for sporting events, until its redevelopment in 2011, where it now can host international televised events.

== History ==
In the early 1950s the Council developed a sports arena and running track on land which had been used for 350 allotments during the Second World War and 80,000 tonnes of soil were removed during construction. Although an athletics event was held in July 1954, it was not until June 1955 that the arena was officially opened by the Lord Lieutenant, Colonel J. C. Wynne Finch. A message from Prince Philip, Duke of Edinburgh was read out and following the official opening, athletes including John Disley took part in the North Wales district championships. Prior to 2011, it had been used for various community sporting and non sporting events and representative matches. In 1987 improvements saw a new synthetic running track, floodlights, terracing and a new all seated grandstand built.

Colwyn Bay F.C. had played on three different grounds at Eirias Park during their history. The Arena was a temporary home for a season and a half during the early 1980s prior to the club's move to their present Llanelian Road home ground. The Seagulls faced Liverpool's reserve side, which included future England international Jamie Carragher, in a pre-season friendly at the Stadium in August 1995 in a game which finished 1-1. The Stadium has hosted Wales youth football internationals over the years, including Wales Under-15 Schoolboys featuring future senior team captain Kevin Ratcliffe beating France 2-0 in front of over 7,000 fans in June 1976 and three years later an Under-15 side featuring Mark Hughes and Mark Bowen lost to West Germany. Wales Under-16s' friendly match against Poland in 2012 featured future Welsh senior internationals Harry Wilson, Daniel James and Joe Morrell

A game between North Wales and a WRU XV was held in April 1956 and on September 28, 1979 North Wales XV faced Romania, in a game which the tourists won 38-15. A year later, as part of the Welsh Rugby Union’s Centenary Year, the North Wales team faced an Overseas side featuring players from seven different countries in a match which the Overseas team won 28-9.

In 2008 the park had been identified by the Welsh Rugby Union (WRU) as a venue for the newly founded rugby union team RGC 1404. The team was initially planning to join the Welsh Premiership, with an eventual goal of becoming the fifth Welsh rugby region, for domestic and European tournaments. In light of this, the park was in need of a number of improvements to reach international standard and so that it could be officially considered a stadium. In January 2010, the proposed redevelopment was approved by the local council, with work starting later that year.

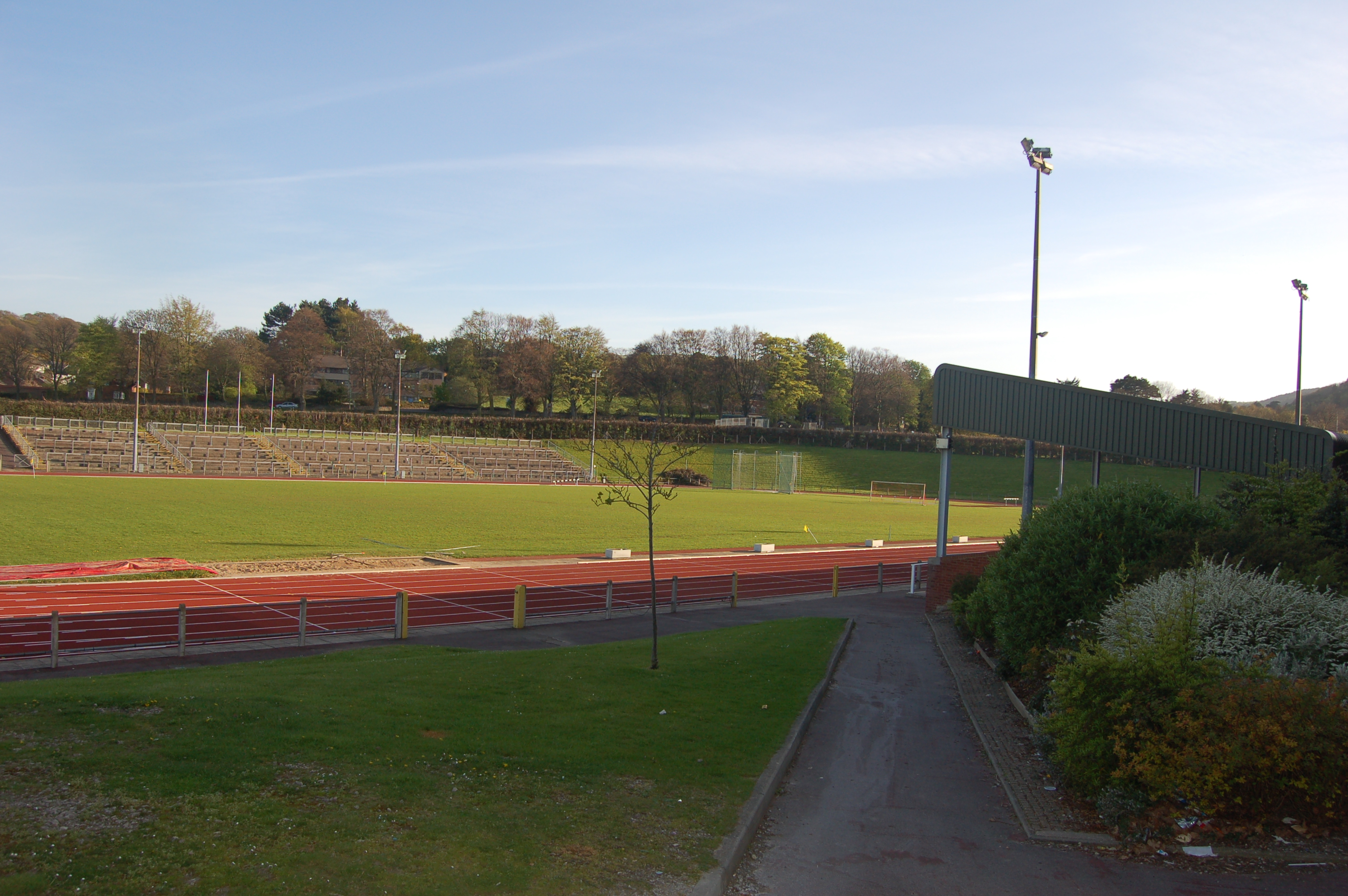
Eirias Stadium in 2006 before redevelopment

The new £6.5 million stadium opened in 2011, featuring a 'Grade A' rugby and football pitch which is to international standard, as well as a 'Grade A' Athletics Track. The stadium now has the potential to host events for up to 15,000 spectators. However its common use for football and rugby, means it normally holds up to 6,080 though the 2,580 capacity grand stand and terracing for a further 3,500. The installment of floodlights and team changing facilities, means the stadium has the capability to broaden their events to other sporting activities and night time kick offs.

Colwyn Bay F.C. were linked with a return to Eirias Stadium in 2011 because of Conference ground regulations and then manager Dave Challinor was impressed with the facilities but the club remained at Llanelian Road.

Since the stadiums reopening, they have hosted numerous international events from sport and music. Sporting wise, the stadium is now official home to RGC 1404. The International Rugby Board (IRB) has recognized the standard of the stadium, and in 2012 the stadium was host to a number of Test matches featuring Canada, Russia, Samoa, Tonga and the United States. In 2013, the IRB again chose Eirias Stadium as a venue to host an International fixture, with Japan winning 40–13 against Russia.

The opening ceremony of the 2014 Wales Rally GB was held at Eirias Stadium. From 2012 to 2024 all Wales' home under-20s games in the Six Nations were played at the stadium. Wales held a training camp at Eirias Stadium ahead of the 2015 Rugby World Cup. A Wales side beat RGC 1404 88–19 in a warm-up game ahead of the 2017 summer tour.

Wales' final game of the 2020 Six Nations Under 20s Championship against Scotland on 13 March 2020 was played behind closed doors due to the COVID-19 outbreak.

In April 2021 rugby league team North Wales Crusaders announced that the stadium would be the club base for the season due to COVID-19 regulations making their home ground in Wrexham unavailable. They have now made Eirias Stadium their permanent home.

=== Sponsorship ===
Between 2017 and 2022 the stadium was known as Stadiwm Zip World. Between 2023 and 2025 it was known as Stadiwm CSM.

== International matches ==
=== Rugby union ===
List of international rugby union matches at Eirias Stadium
Date	Country	Score	Country	Tournament
9 November 2012	United States	40–26	Russia	2012 International Rugby Series
9 November 2012	Canada	12–42	Samoa	2012 International Rugby Series
17 November 2012	United States	13–22	Tonga	2012 International Rugby Series
17 November 2012	Canada	35–3	Russia	2012 International Rugby Series
17 November 2013	Russia	13–40	Japan	Test match
7 November 2014	Canada	17–13	Namibia	Test match

From 2012 to 2024, it hosted Wales home matches in the Six Nations Under 20s Championship.

=== Rugby league ===
List of international rugby league matches at Eirias Stadium
Date	Country	Score	Country	Tournament
17 October 2021	Wales	24–26	Ireland	Test Match

== Concerts ==
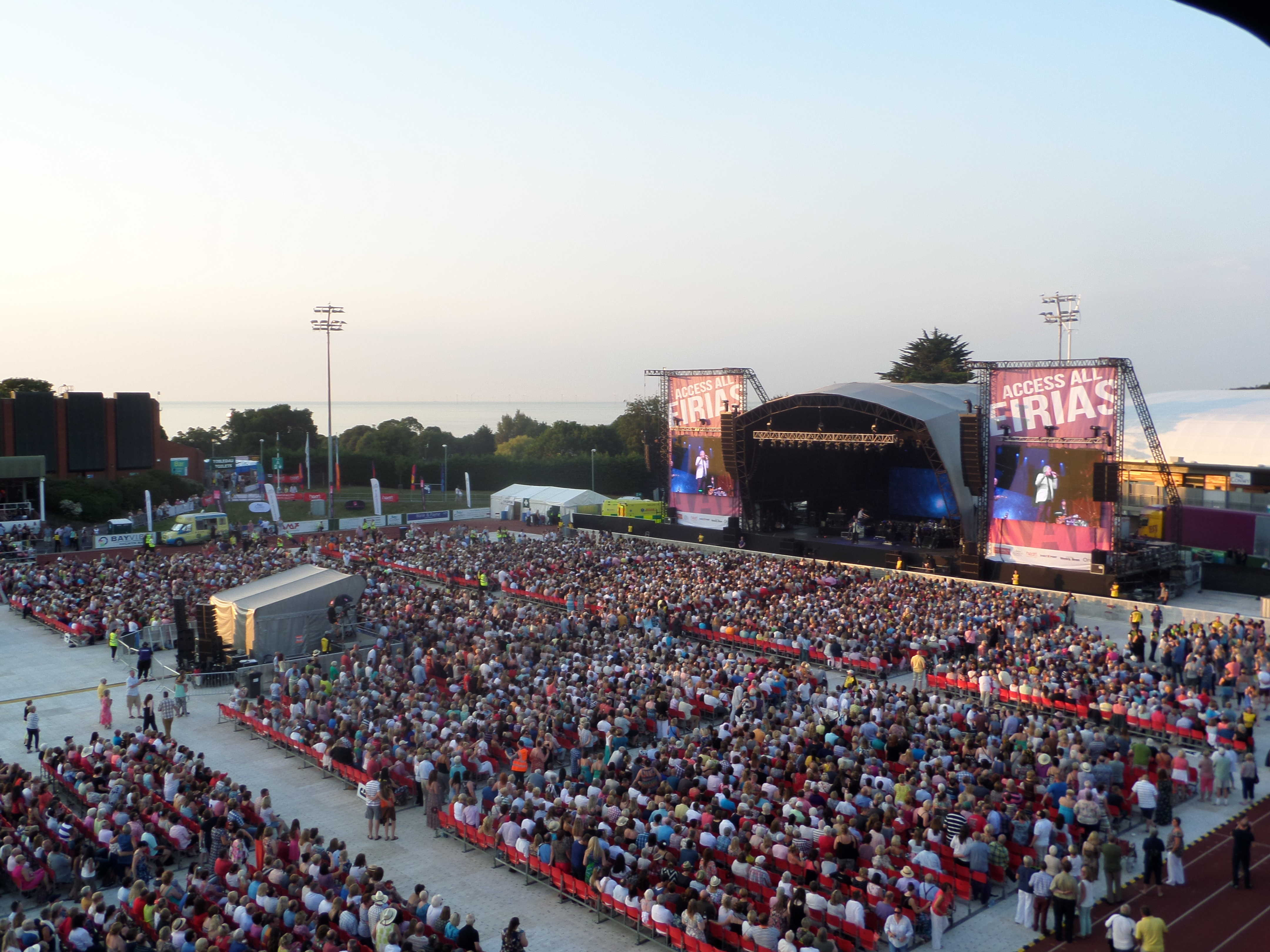
Tom Jones performing at the stadium in 2014

Since 2012, the stadium sees over 15,000 people at the park for the annual Access All Eirias Music Festival. This includes singers like Olly Murs, Pixie Lott, Cover Drive, Little Mix and Welsh performers Tom Jones and Rhydian Roberts.

List of concerts held at Stadiwm CSM
Year	Day/month	Headline artist	Supporting artists
2006	17 November	BBC Children in Need	Jamelia, Ronan Keating, The Feeling
2012	27 July	Only Boys Aloud	Mike Peters, Sophie Evans, Côr Glanaethwy, Sioned Terry
2012	28 July	Olly Murs	Pixie Lott, Cover Drive, A*M*E, Diana Vickers
2013	20 July	The Overtones	Rhydian Roberts, Sophie Evans, Tenors of Rock
2013	21 July	Little Mix	Conor Maynard, Wiley, Loveable Rogues, The Vamps.
2014	25 July	Tom Jones	James Walsh, Sally Barker, Loveable Rogues, The Vamps.
2014	26 July	Jessie J	Lawson, Neon Jungle, Hollywood Ending.
2015	6 June	Elton John	Bright Light Bright Light.
2015	7 July	The Vamps	Foxes, Hometown, Joe Woolford, Only Boys Aloud.
2016	19 June	Lionel Richie	Corinne Bailey Rae
2016	11 September	BBC Proms in the Park	Tony Hadley, Wynne Evans, Amy Wadge.
2017	8 July	Little Mix	Ella Eyre, Sheppard
2017	9 July	Bryan Adams	Jamie Lawson
2018	14 July	Paloma Faith	Jack Savoretti, Nia Wyn
2018	8 September	BBC Proms in the Park	Katherine Jenkins, Lee Mead, Lauren Zhang.
2019			A concert featuring Jess Glynne scheduled for 7 July was cancelled.
2020			The Westlife concert on 5 July and the Little Mix concert scheduled for 11 July were cancelled due to the COVID-19 outbreak.
2022	18 June	Noel Gallagher's High Flying Birds	The Vaccines, Feeder
2022	13 August	Pete Tong & Jules Buckley's Symphony Orchestra	
2022	14 August	Simply Red	Mica Paris
2023	21st July	Ministry of Sound Classical	Roger Sanchez, Judge Jules, K-Klass, Hollie Profit
2023	22nd July	N-Dubz	Nathan Dawe, Wes Nelson
2023	23rd July	Rag 'N' Bone Man	

== See also ==
- List of stadia in Wales by capacity
