= France national under-20 rugby union team =

France
- Union: French Rugby Federation
- Nickname: Les Bleuets (The Little Blues)
- Coach: Sébastien Calvet
- Captain: Hugo Reus
- Most caps: Kilian Geraci (18); Jordan Joseph (18)
- Top scorer: Louis Carbonel (169)
- Most tries: Jordan Joseph (12)

First international
- France 12–6 Scotland (1 February 2008)

Largest win
- France 75–12 Japan (24 June 2023)

Largest defeat
- New Zealand 45–7 France (15 June 2015)

World Cup
- Appearances: 13 (first in 2008)
- Best result: (gold) Champions (3): 2018, 2019 and 2023

The France national under-20 rugby union team (French: Équipe de France de rugby à XV des moins de 20 ans), also known as France under-20s or France U20(s), is the national under-20 rugby union team of France, under the control of the French Rugby Federation. Competing in the annual Six Nations Under 20s Championship, it is considered to be the feeder team for the France national team.

Replacing the two former age grade teams Under 19s and Under 21s, their first tournament was the 2008 Six Nations U20 Championship, where they finished at the third place. Winning the competition in 2009, 2014 – year in which they win the Grand Slam, 2018 and 2025, they also have participated in the inaugural IRB Junior World Championship (later renamed the World Rugby U20 Championship) and all subsequent editions, winning it on three occasions, three times in a row, in 2018, 2019 and 2023.

Nicknamed "Les Bleuets" (French for "The Little Blues"; diminutive from "bleu": blue), they are used to play in medium-sized stadiums all around France. Sébastien Calvet is the current head coach of the team, after having been appointed in 2022.

== Coaching history ==
=== Current staff ===
The following members were part of the France U20 coaching staff for the 2022–23 season. Sébastien Calvet replaced Jean-Marc Béderède as head coach in July 2022.

Position	Name
Head coach	(France) Sébastien Calvet
Backs and attack coach	(France) Benoît Baby
Defence coach	(France) Philippe Boher
Forwards and set piece coach	(France) Rémi Vaquin (incumbent) (France) Samuel Cherouk (back-up)

=== Previous head coaches ===
Picture	Head coach	Tenure	Honours
	(France) Philippe Sella	2008–2011	(gold) 2009 U20 Six Nations Championship; (silver) 2011 U20 Six Nations Championship; (bronze) 2008 U20 Six Nations Championship
	(France) Fabien Pelous	2011–2015	(gold) 2014 U20 Six Nations Championship – Grand Slam; (silver) 2012 U20 Six Nations Championship; (silver) 2015 U20 Six Nations Championship
	(France) Thomas Lièvremont	2015–2017	(silver) 2016 U20 Six Nations Championship; (silver) 2017 U20 Six Nations Championship
—	(France) Sébastien Piqueronies	2017–2019	(gold) 2018 World Rugby U20 Championship; (gold) 2019 World Rugby U20 Championship; (gold) 2018 U20 Six Nations Championship; (silver) 2019 U20 Six Nations Championship
—	(France) Philippe Boher	2019–2021	(silver) 2021 U20 Six Nations Championship
—	(France) Jean-Marc Béderède	2021–2022	(silver) 2022 U20 Six Nations Championship
—	(France) Sébastien Calvet	2022–	(gold) 2023 World Rugby U20 Championship; (silver) 2023 U20 Six Nations Championship

== Players ==
=== Current squad ===
On 23 June 2024, Calvet named a 30-player squad for the 2024 World Rugby U20 Championship in South Africa.

^{1} On 5 July, Zinédine Aouad withdrew from the squad due to injury and was replaced by Charly Gambini.

Head coach: (France) Sébastien Calvet

- Caps updated: 15 March 2024

Player	Position	Date of birth (age)	Caps	Club/province
Thomas Lacombre	Hooker	14 July 2004 (age 22)	9	(France) Toulouse
Mathys Lotrian	Hooker	18 February 2004 (age 22)	1	(France) Perpignan
Barnabé Massa	Hooker	13 May 2004 (age 22)	6	(France) Grenoble
Zinédine Aouad^{1}	Prop	3 May 2005 (age 21)	5	(France) Bordeaux Bègles
Lorencio Boyer Gallardo	Prop	23 September 2005 (age 21)	0	(France) Perpignan
Thomas Duchêne	Prop	25 August 2004 (age 22)	9	(France) Clermont
Samuel Jean-Christophe	Prop	9 March 2006 (age 20)	0	(France) Toulon
Lino Julien	Prop	27 July 2004 (age 22)	9	(France) Racing 92
Thomas Marceline	Prop	18 June 2005 (age 21)	0	(France) Lyon
Antonin Corso	Lock	9 April 2004 (age 22)	3	(France) Oyonnax
Charles Kanté-Samba	Lock	8 February 2005 (age 21)	0	(France) La Rochelle
Brent Liufau	Lock	21 March 2004 (age 22)	12	(France) Pau
Corentin Mézou	Lock	20 April 2005 (age 21)	4	(France) Toulon
Mathis Castro-Ferreira	Back row	13 January 2004 (age 22)	9	(France) Toulouse
Alexis Caumel	Back row	20 July 2004 (age 22)	0	(France) Colomiers
Charly Gambini^{1}	Back row	15 January 2004 (age 22)	4	(France) Provence Rugby
Geoffrey Malaterre	Back row	9 August 2005 (age 21)	2	(France) Brive
Joé Quere-Karaba	Back row	28 September 2004 (age 22)	4	(France) Toulon Bègles
Sialevailea Tolofua	Back row	9 July 2005 (age 21)	4	(France) Toulouse
Léo Carbonneau	Scrum-half	7 October 2004 (age 22)	11	(France) Brive
Thomas Souverbie	Scrum-half	28 June 2004 (age 22)	4	(France) Pau
Axel Desperes	Fly-half	16 January 2004 (age 22)	5	(France) Pau
Hugo Reus (c)	Fly-half	26 July 2004 (age 22)	9	(France) La Rochelle
Mathys Belaubre	Centre	15 March 2005 (age 21)	1	(France) Clermont
Maxence Biasotto	Centre	8 July 2004 (age 22)	6	(France) Brive
Fabien Brau-Boirie	Centre	19 December 2005 (age 20)	4	(France) Pau
Robin Taccola	Centre	4 May 2005 (age 21)	4	(France) Vannes
Nathan Bollengier	Wing	18 January 2004 (age 22)	1	(France) La Rochelle
Hoani Bosmorin	Wing	27 December 2004 (age 21)	2	(France) La Rochelle
Mathis Ferté	Fullback	2 February 2004 (age 22)	10	(France) Brive
Xan Mousques	Fullback	18 November 2005 (age 20)	3	(France) Bayonne

=== Previous squads ===
2023 World Rugby Under 20 Championship squad

The following 30 players were called up for the 2023 World Rugby Under 20 Championship in South Africa.

Hookers: Pierre Jouvin – (Agen); Thomas Lacombre – (Toulouse); Barnabé Massa – (Grenoble); Props: Zaccharie Affane – (Bordeaux Bègles); Thomas Duchêne – (Clermont); Lino Julien – (Racing 92); Alexandre Kaddouri – (La Rochelle); Louis Penverne – (La Rochelle); Locks: Hugo Auradou – (Pau); Brent Liufau – (Pau); Posolo Tuilagi – (Perpignan); Loose forwards: Esteban Capilla – (Bayonne); Mathis Castro-Ferreira – (Toulouse); Marko Gazzotti – (Grenoble); Oscar Jégou – (La Rochelle); Lenni Nouchi (c) – (Montpellier); Andy Timo – (Massy); Noa Zinzen – (Racing 92)	Scrum-halves: Léo Carbonneau – (Brive); Baptiste Jauneau – (Clermont); Fly-halves: Clément Mondinat – (Pau); Hugo Reus – (La Rochelle); Centres: Maxence Biasotto – (Brive); Paul Costes – (Toulouse); Nicolas Depoortère (vc) – (Bordeaux Bègles); Arthur Mathiron – (Lyon); Wings: Léo Drouet – (Provence); Maël Moustin – (Bordeaux Bègles); Full-backs: Théo Attisogbé – (Pau); Mathis Ferté – (Brive)
(c) Denotes team captain (vc) Denotes team vice-captain

2019 World Rugby Under 20 Championship squad

The following 28 players were called up for the 2019 World Rugby Under 20 Championship in Argentina.

Hookers: Rayne Barka – (Pau); Théo Lachaud – (Toulon); Props: Giorgi Beria – (Clermont); Axel Burin – (Agen); Eli Eglaine – (Grenoble); Jean-Baptiste Gros – (Toulon); Paul Mallez – (ABCD XV); Locks: Killian Geraci – (Grenoble); Gauthier Maravat – (Agen); Florent Vanverberghe – (Toulon); Loose forwards: Matthias Haddad – (La Rochelle); Thibaut Hamonou – (Toulouse); Mathieu Hirigoyen – (Biarritz); Loïc Hocquet – (Agen); Jordan Joseph – (Racing 92); Sacha Zegueur – (Oyonnax)	Scrum-halves: Léo Coly – (Mont-de-Marsan); Quentin Delord – (Lyon); Fly-halves: Louis Carbonel – (Toulon); Centres: Julien Delbouis – (Stade Français); Mathieu Smaïli – (Toulon); Arthur Vincent (c) – (Montpellier); Antoine Zeghdar – (Toulon); Wings: Ethan Dumortier – (Lyon); Vincent Pinto – (Pau); Donovan Taofifénua – (Clermont); Full-backs: Alexandre De Nardi – (Mont-de-Marsan); Matthis Lebel – (Toulouse)
(c) Denotes team captain

2018 World Rugby Under 20 Championship squad

The following 30 players were called up for the 2018 World Rugby Under 20 Championship in France.

Hookers: Maxime Lamothe – (Bordeaux Bègles); Guillaume Marchand – (Toulouse); Props: Demba Bamba – (Brive); Giorgi Beria – (Clermont); Ugo Boniface – (Bayonne); Daniel Brennan – (Toulouse); Jean-Baptiste Gros – (Toulon); Hassane Kolingar – (Racing 92); Locks: Pierre-Henri Azagoh – (Massy); Killian Geraci – (Grenoble); Thomas Lavault – (La Rochelle); Alban Roussel – (Perpignan); Loose forwards: Antonin Berruyer – (Grenoble); Ibrahim Diallo – (Racing 92); Charlie Francoz – (Stade Français); Jordan Joseph – (Racing 92); Cameron Woki – (Bordeaux Bègles); Sacha Zegueur – (Oyonnax)	Scrum-halves: Arthur Coville (c) – (Stade Français); Jules Gimbert – (Bordeaux Bègles); Fly-halves: Louis Carbonel – (Toulon); Romain Ntamack – (Toulouse); Centres: Pierre-Louis Barassi – (Lyon); Adrien Séguret – (Lyon); Arthur Vincent – (Montpellier); Wings: Iban Etcheverry – (Bordeaux Bègles); Maxime Marty – (Toulouse); Lucas Tauzin – (Toulouse); Full-backs: Clément Laporte – (Agen); Matthis Lebel – (Toulouse)
(c) Denotes team captain

=== Award winners ===
The following France U20s players have been recognised at the World Rugby Awards since 2008:

World Rugby Junior Player of the Year
Year	Nominees	Winners
2018	Jordan Joseph	Jordan Joseph
2018	Romain Ntamack	Jordan Joseph
2019	Louis Carbonel	—

== Competitive record ==
=== World Rugby Under 20 Championship ===
Year	Round	Position	Pld	W	D	L	PF	PA
(Wales) 2008	5th-8th place	6th	5	3	0	2	155	102
(Japan) 2009	5th-8th place	5th	5	4	0	1	202	100
(Argentina) 2010	5th-8th place	5th	5	4	0	1	146	94
(Italy) 2011	Semi-final	4th	5	3	0	2	117	114
(South Africa) 2012	5th-8th place	6th	5	3	0	2	102	89
(France) 2013	5th-8th place	5th	5	3	0	2	116	101
(New Zealand) 2014	5th-8th place	6th	5	3	0	2	105	83
(Italy) 2015	Semi-final	4th	5	3	0	2	121	111
(England) 2016	9th-12th place	9th	5	3	0	2	160	129
(Georgia (country)) 2017	Semi-final	4th	5	2	1	2	144	124
(France) 2018	Champions	1st	5	5	0	0	145	97
(Argentina) 2019	Champions	1st	5	4	0	1	138	110
2020–2022	Cancelled due to COVID-19 pandemic							
(South Africa) 2023	Champions	1st	5	5	0	0	255	90
(South Africa) 2024								
Total	13/13	3 Titles	65	45	1	19	1906	1344

== Honours ==
- World Rugby U20 Championship
  - Winners (3): 2018, 2019, 2023
- U20 Six Nations Championship
  - Winners (5): 2009, 2014 – Grand Slam, 2018, 2025, 2026 – Grand Slam
  - Runners-up (9): 2011, 2012, 2015, 2016, 2017, 2019, 2021, 2022, 2023
  - Third place (1): 2008
