= Wales national under-20 rugby union team =

Wales Under-20s
- Union: Welsh Rugby Union
- Emblem: The Prince of Wales's feathers
- Ground(s): Eirias Stadium, Colwyn Bay
- Coach: Richard Whiffin
- Captain: Harri Ackerman
Team kit	Change kit

First international
- Wales 15–28 England (1 February 2008)

Largest win
- Wales 74–3 Samoa (12 June 2012)

Largest defeat
- New Zealand 92–0 Wales (14 June 2011)

World Cup
- Appearances: 12 (First in 2008)
- Best result: Runners up, 2013

The Wales national under-20 rugby union team is for Welsh rugby union players aged 20 or under on 1 January of the year during which they are selected.

Under-20 age grade rugby came into existence as a result of the IRB combining the Under 19 Rugby World Championship and Under 21 Rugby World Championship into a single IRB Junior World Championship tournament. They also compete in the Six Nations Under 20s Championship.

== Six Nations Under-20 Championship ==
Wales finished second in the 2008 tournament, losing only to England.

In 2013 Wales were denied a Grand Slam in their final match against England, and ultimately placing second on points difference.

Wales finally achieved a Grand Slam and their first U20 title in 2016, defeating Italy on the final week 35–6, having been level 6–6 at half time. They also secured their first Triple Crown at this age group.

In 2023, the side did not win a single match, leading to their first winless tournament of the U20 era.

Ahead of the 2024 Six Nations Under 20s Championship, Richard Whiffin was named as head coach, replacing Mark Jones who joined the Ospreys.

== Junior World Championships ==
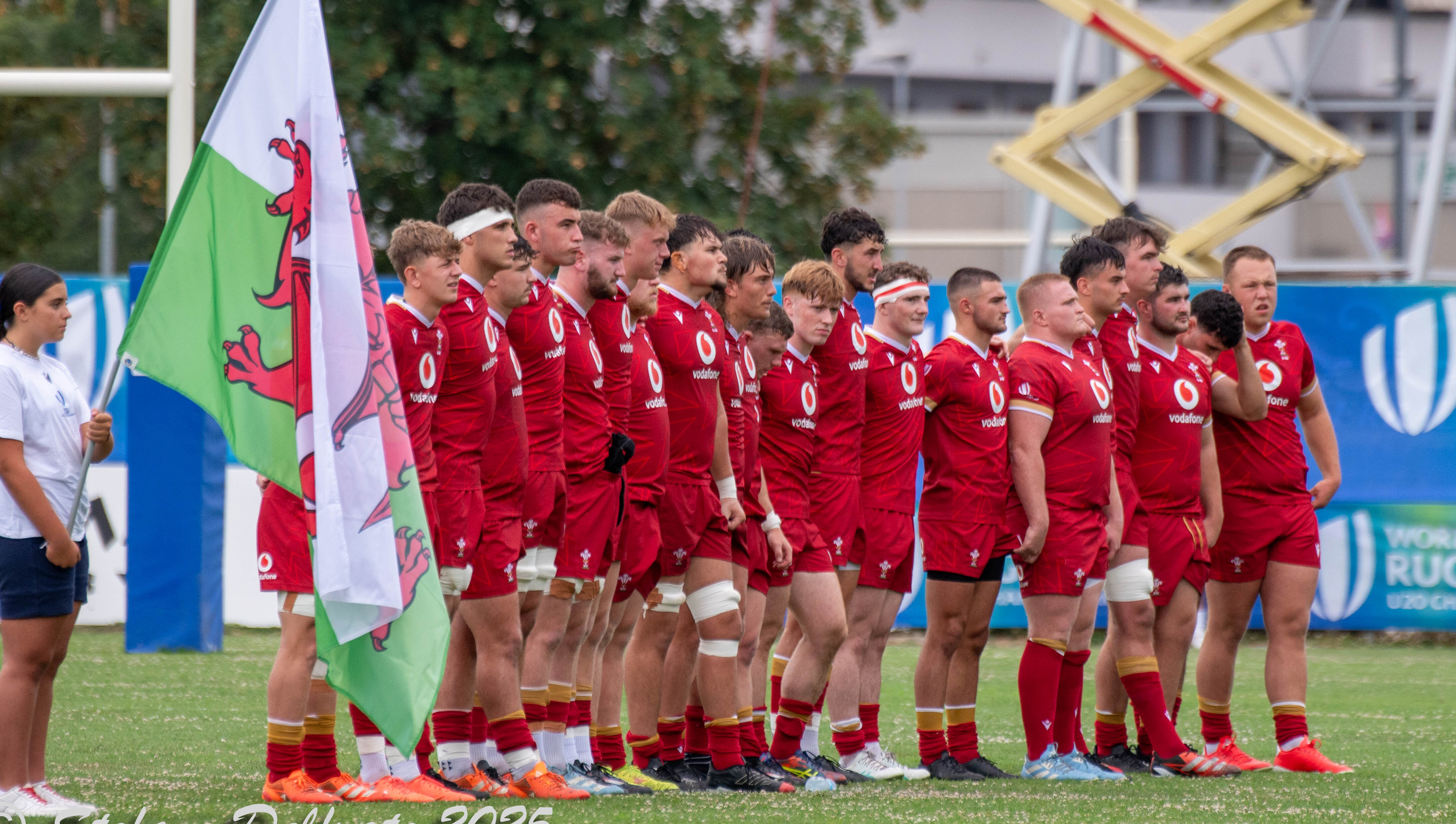
Wales under-20 team at the 2025 World Rugby U20 Championship.

In June 2008 Wales hosted the 2008 IRB Junior World Championship. As hosts they played all their group matches at the Liberty Stadium in Swansea, starting against Italy on Friday 6 June, before further ties against Japan and France. Wales won all three group matches before losing the semi-final to New Zealand and subsequently losing the 3rd place play-off to South Africa.

For the tournament the same management team remained from the 2008 U20 Six Nations; head coach Patrick Horgan and assistant coaches Rob Appleyard and Wayne Jones. Sam Warbuton remained as captain.

For the next two Junior World championships, Wales alongside France will have to start the pool stages with a three-point deficit, following a brawl between the two sides in the 2008 tournament.

At the 2010 IRB Junior World Championship the Welsh squad won 2 games in the preliminary round against Samoa and Fiji while losing to New Zealand. At the playoffs for the 5th–8th place they first drew with Argentina 19–19 but lost in a drop goal shootout 9–8 and then met Fiji for a second time, again winning by 39–15 to finish in 7th place.

In 2011, after winning their opening game 34–8 against Argentina they were on the receiving end of a 92–0 thrashing by New Zealand in Italy, a record defeat for the side.

In 2012 Wales beat New Zealand 9–6, the first time the Baby Blacks have ever been defeated in the competition. This was also the first Welsh win against New Zealand at any level since 1954. However, later in the tournament Wales lost 30-6 to New Zealand in the semi-final.

2013 was the side's most successful year, making it to the final, where they faced England. Wales lead 15–3 at half time, but ultimately lost 23–15.

Ahead of the 2023 Junior World Championship, former international wing Mark Jones was appointed as head coach, replacing Byron Hayward.

== Players ==
=== Current squad ===
Head coach Richard Whiffin named a 30-man squad for the 2026 World Rugby Junior World Championship.

Player	Position	Club
Tom Howe	Hooker	(Wales) Cardiff
James Talamai	Hooker	(Wales) Dragons
Oscar Thomas	Hooker	(England) Bath Rugby
Dylan James	Prop	(Wales) Ospreys
George Tuckley	Prop	(Wales) Dragons
Yestyn Cook	Prop	(Wales) Scarlets
Isaac Godfrey	Prop	(England) Exeter Chiefs
Jac Pritchard	Prop	(Wales) Scarlets
Tom Cottle	Lock	(Wales) Cardiff
Luke Evans	Lock	(England) Exeter Chiefs
Will Evans	Lock	(Wales) Scarlets
Osian B Williams	Lock	(England) Bristol Bears
Deian Gwynne	Back Row	(England) Gloucester
Caio James	Back Row	(England) Gloucester
Evan Minto	Back Row	(Wales) Dragons
Sam Morgan	Back Row	(Wales) Ospreys
Alex Ridgeway	Back Row	(England) Bath Rugby
Osian Williams	Back Row	(Wales) Scarlets
Sion Davies	Scrum-half	(Wales) Cardiff
Cai Gealy	Scrum-half	(England) Bristol Bears
Carwyn Leggatt-Jones	Fly-half	(Wales) Scarlets
Lloyd Lucas	Fly-half	(Wales) Cardiff
Bailey Cutts	Centre	(Wales) Cardiff
Osian Darwin-Lewis	Centre	(Wales) Cardiff
Steffan Emanuel	Centre	(Wales) Cardiff
Jack Hoskins	Centre	(Wales) Ospreys
Brogan Leary	Centre	(Wales) Dragons
Tom Bowen	Wing	(Wales) Cardiff
Dylan Scott	Wing	(Wales) Cardiff Met
Rhys Cummings	Fullback	(Wales) Cardiff
Lewis Edwards	Fullback	(Wales) Ospreys

=== Award winners ===
The following Wales U20s players have been recognised at the World Rugby Awards since 2008:

World Rugby Junior Player of the Year
Year	Nominees	Winners
2013	Sam Davies	Sam Davies

=== Management ===
Position	Name
Head coach	Richard Whiffin
Assistant coach	Richie Pugh
Defence coach	Scott Sneddon
Forwards coach	Sam Hobbs
Strength & conditioning	Rhodri Williams
Team manager	Andy Lloyd

== Results and statistics ==
Junior World Championships
Year	P	W	D	L	PF	PA	Diff	BP	Pts	Pool place	Play-offs	Final position
2008	3	3	0	0	85	39	+46	2	14	1st	(Semifinals) Lost to New Zealand 31–6 (3rd Place Final) Lost to South Africa 43–18	4th
2009	3	2	0	1	107	58	+49	2	7	2nd	(5th–8th Semifinals) Beat Ireland 19–17 (5th Place Final) Lost to France 68–13	6th
2010	3	2	0	1	63	59	+4	0	8	2nd	(5th–8th Semifinals) Lost to Argentina 19–19 (9–8 in drop goal shootout) (7th Place Final) Beat Fiji 39–15	7th
2011	3	2	0	1	90	106	-16	2	10	3rd	(5th–8th Semifinals) Lost to Fiji 34–20 (7th Place Final) Beat Ireland 38–24	7th
2012	3	3	0	0	127	27	+100	2	11	1st	(Semifinals) Lost to New Zealand 30–6 (3rd Place Final) Beat Argentina 25–17	3rd
2013	3	3	0	0	93	44	+49	1	13	1st	(Semifinals) Beat South Africa 18–17 (Finals) Lost to England 23–15	2nd
2014	3	2	0	1	82	57	+25	1	9	2nd	(5th–8th Semifinals) Lost to France 19–18 (7th Place Final) Beat Samoa 20–3	7th
2015	3	1	0	2	92	52	+40	1	5	3rd	(5th–8th Semifinals) Beat Ireland 22–12 (5th Place Final) Lost to Australia 28–23	6th
2016	3	1	0	2	52	53	-1	3	7	3rd	(5th–8th Semifinals) Lost to New Zealand 71–12 (7th Place Final) Beat Scotland 42–19	7th
2017	3	1	0	2	93	78	+15	2	6	3rd	(5th–8th Semifinals) Lost to Scotland 29–25 (7th Place Final) Beat Italy 25–24	7th
2018	3	2	0	1	54	80	-26	0	8	2nd	(5th–8th Semifinals) Lost to Argentina 39–15 (7th Place Final) Beat Italy 34–17	7th
2019	3	2	0	1	87	85	+2	1	9	3rd	(5th–8th Semifinals) Beat New Zealand 8–7 (5th Place Final) Lost to England 45–26	6th
2023	3	1	0	2	86	89	-3	3	7	3rd	(5th–8th Semifinals) Beat Georgia 40–21 (5th Place Final) Lost to Australia 57–33	6th
2024	3	1	0	2	76	80	-4	2	7	3rd	(5th–8th Semifinals) Lost to Australia 36–29 (7th Place Final) Lost to South Africa 47–31	8th
2025	3	1	0	2	83	94	-11	1	6	3rd	(5th–8th Semifinals) Lost to England 51–13 (7th Place Final) Lost to Italy 31–23	8th

Under 20 Six Nations Championships
Season	P	W	D	L	P	Position
2007	5	1	1	3	3	4th
2008	5	4	0	1	8	2nd
2009	5	1	0	4	2	5th
2010	5	3	0	2	6	3rd
2011	5	2	1	2	5	3rd
2012	5	2	0	3	4	4th
2013	5	4	0	1	8	2nd
2014	5	3	0	2	6	3rd
2015	5	4	0	1	8	3rd
2016	5	5	0	0	10	1st (Grand Slam)
2017	5	3	0	2	14	3rd
2018	5	2	0	3	10	5th
2019	5	2	0	3	10	4th
2020	5	2	0	3	8	Tournament suspended
2021	5	2	0	3	9	4th
2022	5	1	0	4	6	5th
2023	5	0	0	5	3	6th
2024	5	2	0	3	10	5th
2025	5	3	0	2	12	3rd
2026	5	1	0	4	8	4th

== Honours ==
- World Rugby Under 20 Championship
  - Runners-up (1): 2013
- Six Nations Under 20s Championship
  - Winners (1): 2016
  - Grand Slam (1): 2016
  - Triple Crown (1): 2016
