= Dubarry Park =

Rugby union stadium in Ireland

- Páirc de Barra
- Location within Ireland
- Location: Coosan, Athlone, Ireland
- Coordinates: 53°26′07″N 07°55′23″W
- Owner: Buccaneers RFC
- Capacity: 10,000
- Type: rugby union ground
- Surface: grass
- Field size: 122 × 68 m (133 × 74 yds)

Construction
- Renovated: 2003

Tenants
- Buccaneers RFC; Ireland national U20 rugby (2005–2015)

Dubarry Park is a rugby union stadium in Cornamangh townland, near the Coosan area of Athlone, County Westmeath, Ireland. It is the home ground of Buccaneers RFC and has a capacity of 10,000 spectators. Between 2005 and 2015, it hosted Ireland's home matches in the Six Nations Under 20s Championship.

== History ==
Dubarry Park is named after Dubarry of Ireland who sponsor Buccaneers RFC. Though mostly used for rugby, the ground has also been used by association football team Athlone Town. In 2003, the ground was redeveloped with a new stand and clubhouse erected.

=== Professional rugby usage ===
Dubarry Park has been used several times for professional rugby matches. In 2005, it was selected by the Irish Rugby Football Union to host the Ireland national under-20 rugby union team's matches in the Six Nations Under 20s Championship. The ground continued to host Ireland Under-20s until 2016 when the matches were moved to Donnybrook Stadium in Dublin. Following Buccaneers' lobbying the IRFU returned Ireland Under-20s matches to Dubarry Park. However, the IRFU revisited their decision and moved matches to Musgrave Park in Cork due to low attendances. The senior Ireland national rugby union team since used the ground as a venue for training.

Dubarry Park has also been used by Connacht Rugby. In 2002, it hosted Connacht's European Challenge Cup quarter final against Pontypridd. Connacht also hosted three Celtic League games there in 2003. Later, they continued to use it to host pre-season fixtures against opposition such as Wasps and Exeter Chiefs due to their usual Galway Sportsgrounds being unavailable.

== See also ==
- List of rugby league stadiums by capacity
- List of rugby union stadiums by capacity
