= Six Nations Under 20s Championship =

Rugby championship

- Current season or competition: 2026 Six Nations Under 20s Championship
- Sport: Rugby union
- Instituted: 2008; 18 years ago
- Number of teams: 6
- Country: England; France; Ireland; Italy; Scotland; Wales
- Holders: France (2026)
- Most titles: England (10 titles)
- Website: Official website

The Six Nations Under 20s Championship is an international rugby union tournament for the under-20 men's teams of the national unions making up the Six Nations Championship and is organised under the same format.

Originally the tournament was in an under-21 format but changed after four editions to under-20s in 2008. England were the inaugural winners and they have gone on to be the tournament's most successful team, winning ten of the twenty-one titles up to 2025 (the 2020 competition having been abandoned during the Covid pandemic), while four of the six teams involved have won the competition at some point.

The tournament is played annually during February and March on the same weekends as the senior men's Six Nations. The competition retains from its senior equivalent the concepts of both the Grand Slam, Triple Crown and the Wooden Spoon.

== Winners ==
Six Nations Under 21s Championship
Year	Winner	Grand Slam	Triple Crown	Ref.
2004	England	England	England	
2005	Wales	Wales	Wales	
2006	England	England	England	
2007	Ireland	Ireland	Ireland	
Six Nations Under 20s Championship
Year	Winner	Grand Slam	Triple Crown	Ref.
2008	England	England	England	
2009	France	—N/a	—N/a	
2010	Ireland	—N/a	Ireland	
2011	England	England	England	
2012	England	—N/a	England	
2013	England	—N/a	—N/a	
2014	France	France	England	
2015	England	—N/a	—N/a	
2016	Wales	Wales	Wales	
2017	England	England	England	
2018	France	—N/a	—N/a	
2019	Ireland	Ireland	Ireland	
2020	Cancelled	—N/a	Ireland	
2021	England	England	England	
2022	Ireland	Ireland	Ireland	
2023	Ireland	Ireland	Ireland	
2024	England	—N/a	—N/a	
2025	France	—N/a	—N/a	
2026	France	France	Ireland	

== Statistics ==
	England	France	Ireland	Italy	Scotland	Wales
Tournaments	22	22	22	22	22	22
Wins
Under-21 Championship	2	—N/a	1	—N/a	—N/a	1
Under-20 Championship	8	5	4	—N/a	—N/a	1
Overall	10	5	5	—N/a	—N/a	2
Grand Slams
Under-21 Championship	2	—N/a	1	—N/a	—N/a	1
Under-20 Championship	4	2	3	—N/a	—N/a	1
Overall	6	2	4	—N/a	—N/a	2
Triple Crowns
Under-21 Championship	2	—N/a	1	—N/a	—N/a	1
Under-20 Championship	6	—N/a	6	—N/a	—N/a	1
Overall	8	—N/a	7	—N/a	—N/a	2
Wooden Spoons
Under-21 Championship	—N/a	—N/a	1	2	—N/a	1
Under-20 Championship	—N/a	—N/a	1	7	8	1
Overall	—N/a	—N/a	2	9	9	2
