= List of 2023–24 United Rugby Championship transfers =

This is a list of player transfers involving United Rugby Championship rugby union teams between the end of the 2022–23 season and before the start of the 2023–24 season.

== Benetton ==
=== Players in ===
- (England) Andy Uren from (England) Bristol Bears
- (Tonga) Malakai Fekitoa from (Ireland) Munster
- (Italy) Edoardo Iachizzi from (France) Vannes
- (Italy) Giosuè Zilocchi from (England) London Irish
- (South Africa) Eli Snyman from (England) Leicester Tigers
- (South Africa) Gideon Koegelenberg from (Japan) Kurita Water Gush Akishima
- (Italy) Mirco Spagnolo from (Italy) Petrarca
- (Italy) Nicolò Casilio from (Italy) Colorno
- (Italy) Paolo Odogwu from (France) Stade Français
- (Argentina) Santiago Ruiz from (Argentina) Pampas XV

=== Players out ===
- (South Africa) Corniel Els retired
- (Argentina) Manuel Arroyo released
- (Italy) Braam Steyn released
- (South Africa) Carl Wegner to (South Africa) Cheetahs
- (Argentina) Enzo Avaca to (Italy) Mogliano
- (Argentina) Giuliano Avaca to (Italy) Mogliano
- (Italy) Nicola Piantella to (Italy) Zebre Parma
- (Italy) Matteo Meggiato to (Italy) Rovigo Delta
- (Italy) Mattia Bellini to (Italy) Petrarca
- (Italy) Matteo Drudi to (Italy) Fiamme Oro
- (Italy) Manfredi Albanese to (Italy) Lazio
- (Italy) Dewi Passarella to (Italy) Mogliano
- (Italy) Cherif Traorè to (France) Mont-de-Marsan
- (Argentina) Santiago Ruiz released
- (Italy) Matteo Minozzi retired
- (Italy) Filippo Alongi to (France) Béziers

== Bulls ==
=== Players in ===
- (South Africa) Wilco Louw from (England) Harlequins
- (South Africa) Jannes Kirsten from (England) Exeter Chiefs
- (South Africa) Henry Immelman from (Scotland) Edinburgh
- (South Africa) Sebastian de Klerk from (South Africa) Pumas
- (South Africa) Sergeal Petersen from (Japan) Shimizu Koto Blue Sharks
- (Scotland) Jaco van der Walt from (Scotland) Edinburgh
- (South Africa) Mpilo Gumede from (South Africa) Sharks
- (South Africa) Khutha Mchunu from (South Africa) Sharks
- (South Africa) Akker van der Merwe from (England) Sale Sharks
- (South Africa) Willie le Roux from (Japan) Toyota Verblitz
- (South Africa) Devon Williams from (South Africa) Pumas
- (South Africa) Deon Slabbert from (South Africa) Pumas
- (South Africa) Cornel Smit from (South Africa) Stormers

=== Players out ===
- (South Africa) Morné Steyn retired
- (South Africa) Bismarck du Plessis retired
- (South Africa) Lizo Gqoboka to (South Africa) Stormers
- (South Africa) Wandisile Simelane to (South Africa) Stormers
- (South Africa) Sbu Nkosi to (South Africa) Cheetahs

== Cardiff ==
=== Players in ===
- (Wales) Theo Cabango promoted from Academy
- (England) Rhys Litterick from (England) Harlequins
- (South Africa) Tinus de Beer from (South Africa) Pumas
- (Wales) Rhys Barratt promoted from Academy
- (Wales) Jacob Beetham promoted from Academy
- (Wales) Gwilym Bradley promoted from Academy
- (Wales) Evan Lloyd promoted from Academy
- (Wales) Alex Mann promoted from Academy
- (Wales) Mackenzie Martin promoted from Academy
- (Wales) Cameron Winnett promoted from Academy
- (England) Ciaran Parker from (England) London Irish
- (Wales) Arwel Robson from (England) Cornish Pirates
- (Wales) Matthew Aubrey from (Wales) Swansea
- (England) Max Clark from (Wales) Dragons (short-term loan)
- (Wales) Josh Reynolds from (Wales) Dragons (short-term loan)
- (Wales) Dafydd Hughes from Jersey Reds
- (England) Gabriel Hamer-Webb from (New Zealand) Southland (short-term deal)
- (Wales) Alun Lawrence from Jersey Reds (short-term deal)
- (England) Ben Donnell from (England) Gloucester

=== Players out ===
- (Wales) Max Llewellyn to (England) Gloucester
- (Wales) Jarrod Evans to (England) Harlequins
- (Wales) Dillon Lewis to (England) Harlequins
- (Moldova) Dmitri Arhip released
- (Wales) Josh Navidi retired
- (Wales) Rhys Priestland released
- (Wales) James Ratti to (Wales) Ospreys
- (Wales) Lloyd Williams to (England) Ealing Trailfinders
- (Wales) Brad Thyer to (England) Ealing Trailfinders
- (Wales) Joe Peard to Jersey Reds
- (Wales) Liam Williams to (Japan) Kubota Spears
- (Wales) Ioan Evans to (England) Cornish Pirates
- (Wales) Kristian Dacey to (Wales) Brecon
- (Wales) Jason Harries to (Wales) Cardiff RFC
- (Wales) Kirby Myhill to (United States) Miami Sharks
- (Wales) Matthew Morgan retired

== Connacht ==
=== Players in ===
- (Ireland) Joe Joyce from (England) Bristol Bears
- (New Zealand) Sean Jansen from (England) Leicester Tigers
- (Ireland) Andrew Smith from (Ireland) Leinster
- (Ireland) Seán O'Brien from (Ireland) Leinster
- (Argentina) Santiago Cordero from (France) Bordeaux
- Liam McNamara from Ireland Sevens
- (New Zealand) Declan Moore from (Ireland) Ulster (season-long loan)
- (Ireland) Michael McDonald from (Ireland) Ulster (season-long loan)
- (Ireland) JJ Hanrahan from (Wales) Dragons
- (Ireland) Tadgh McElroy from (Ireland) Leinster (short-term deal)

=== Players out ===
- (Ireland) Kieran Marmion to (England) Bristol Bears
- (Ireland) Alex Wootton retired
- (Ireland) Shane Delahunt retired
- (Ireland) Conor Fitzgerald released
- (Ireland) Seán Masterson released
- (Ireland) Ciaran Booth to Jersey Reds
- (Ireland) Peter Sullivan to Jersey Reds
- (Ireland) Adam Byrne retired
- (Tonga) Leva Fifita to (France) Oyonnax
- (New Zealand) Declan Moore to (United States) Anthem Rugby Carolina
- (Ireland) Liam McNamara released

== Dragons ==
=== Players in ===
- (Wales) Dane Blacker from (Wales) Scarlets
- (Wales) Corey Baldwin from (Wales) Scarlets
- (Wales) Dan Lydiate from (Wales) Ospreys
- (Wales) Cai Evans from (Wales) Ospreys
- (Argentina) Rodrigo Martínez from (Argentina) Pampas XV

=== Players out ===
- (Wales) Will Rowlands to (France) Racing 92
- (Wales) Lennon Greggains released
- (Wales) Sam Davies to (France) Grenoble
- (Ireland) JJ Hanrahan to (Ireland) Connacht
- (Wales) Ben Moa to (Wales) Pontypool RFC
- (Wales) Luke Yendle to (England) Ampthill (season-long loan)
- (Wales) Ioan Davies to (Wales) Newport
- (Wales) Rob Evans to (United States) Miami Sharks
- (Wales) Ben Fry to (United States) Dallas Jackals
- (England) Max Clark to (Wales) Cardiff (short-term loan)
- (Wales) Josh Reynolds to (Wales) Cardiff (short-term loan)
- (England) Huw Taylor to (United States) Seattle Seawolves
- (Wales) Ellis Shipp released

== Edinburgh ==
=== Players in ===
- (Scotland) Ben Healy from (Ireland) Munster
- (Scotland) Robin Hislop from (England) Saracens
- (Scotland) Javan Sebastian from (Wales) Scarlets
- (Scotland) Mikey Jones promoted from Academy
- (Scotland) Harry Paterson promoted from Academy
- (Scotland) Cameron Scott promoted from Academy
- (Scotland) Scott Steele from (England) Harlequins
- (Scotland) Ewan Ashman from (England) Sale Sharks
- (Scotland) Nathan Sweeney promoted from Academy
- (Scotland) Tom Dodd from (England) Coventry
- (Scotland) Mitch Eadie from (Canada) Toronto Arrows (short-term deal)
- (South Africa) Tim Swiel from (Japan) Toyota Industries Shuttles Aichi (short-term deal)
- (Scotland) D'Arcy Rae from (France) Montpellier
- Jordan Edmunds from Scotland Sevens (short-term deal)
- Ross McCann from Scotland Sevens (short-term deal)
- (England) Cameron Neild from (Scotland) Glasgow Warriors (short-term deal)
- (Scotland) Ali Price from (Scotland) Glasgow Warriors

=== Players out ===
- (South Africa) Henry Immelman to (South Africa) Bulls
- (Scotland) Murray McCallum to (England) Newcastle Falcons
- (Fiji) Lee-Roy Atalifo released
- (Scotland) Ben Evans released
- (Scotland) Nick Haining released
- (Scotland) Matt Russell released
- (Scotland) Stuart McInally retired
- (Scotland) Cammy Hutchison to (England) Newcastle Falcons
- (England) Elliot Millar-Mills to (England) Northampton Saints
- (Scotland) Dan Gamble to (Scotland) Southern Knights
- (England) Jamie Jack to (England) Bedford Blues
- (Scotland) Harri Morris to (England) Doncaster Knights (season-long loan)
- (New Zealand) Harrison Courtney to (England) Doncaster Knights
- (Scotland) Jaco van der Walt to (South Africa) Bulls
- (England) Pierce Phillips to (France) Grenoble
- (Scotland) Rudi Brown to (France) Vannes
- (England) Nick Auterac to (Scotland) Southern Knights
- (Scotland) Henry Pyrgos retired
- (Scotland) Mitch Eadie to (England) Hartpury University
- (Scotland) Damien Hoyland to (United States) Old Glory DC
- (Ireland) Bruce Houston to (England) Cornish Pirates
- (Scotland) Jack Blain to (Scotland) Heriot's
- (Scotland) Blair Kinghorn to (France) Toulouse
- (England) Cameron Neild to (England) Sale Sharks
- (Ireland) Adam McBurney to (England) Gloucester (short-term loan)

== Glasgow Warriors ==
=== Players in ===
- (South Africa) Henco Venter from (South Africa) Sharks
- (Scotland) Kyle Rowe from (England) London Irish
- (Scotland) Logan Trotter from (England) London Irish
- (United States) Greg Peterson from (England) Newcastle Falcons (short-term deal)

=== Players out ===
- (England) Lewis Bean to (France) Montauban
- (Scotland) Ryan Wilson released
- (Scotland) Sam Johnson to (France) Brive
- (Scotland) Rhys Tait to (England) Doncaster Knights
- (Scotland) Archie Smeaton to (England) Doncaster Knights
- (Scotland) Simon Berghan retired
- (New Zealand) Cole Forbes to (New Zealand) Bay of Plenty
- (Argentina) Domingo Miotti to (France) Oyonnax
- (England) Cameron Neild to (Scotland) Edinburgh
- (Scotland) Ali Price to (Scotland) Edinburgh (season-long loan)

== Leinster ==
=== Players in ===
- (Ireland) John McKee promoted from Academy
- (Ireland) Rob Russell promoted from Academy
- (Ireland) Alex Soroka promoted from Academy
- (Ireland) Lee Barron promoted from Academy
- (Ireland) Sam Prendergast promoted from Academy

=== Players out ===
- (Ireland) Jonathan Sexton retired
- (Ireland) Andrew Smith to (Ireland) Connacht
- (Ireland) Seán O'Brien to (Ireland) Connacht
- (Ireland) Max O'Reilly released
- (Ireland) Marcus Hanan released
- (Georgia (country)) Vakh Abdaladze to (France) Brive
- (Ireland) Nick McCarthy to (United States) Chicago Hounds
- (Ireland) Dave Kearney to (United States) Chicago Hounds
- (Ireland) Tadgh McElroy to (Ireland) Connacht

== Lions ==
=== Players in ===
- (South Africa) Erich Cronjé from (Italy) Zebre Parma
- (South Africa) Zander du Plessis from (South Africa) Griquas
- (South Africa) Richard Kriel from (Italy) Zebre Parma
- (South Africa) Conraad van Vuuren from (South Africa) Cheetahs
- (South Africa) Kade Wolhuter from (South Africa) Stormers (season-long loan)

=== Players out ===
- (South Africa) Jaco Kriel retired
- (South Africa) Sti Sithole to (South Africa) Stormers
- (South Africa) Pieter Jansen van Vuren to (France) Biarritz
- (South Africa) Michael van Vuuren to (England) Newcastle Falcons
- (South Africa) André Warner to (France) Agen

== Munster ==
=== Players in ===
- (Ireland) John Ryan from (New Zealand) Chiefs
- (New Zealand) Alex Nankivell from (New Zealand) Chiefs
- (Ireland) Patrick Campbell promoted from Academy
- (Ireland) Cian Hurley promoted from Academy
- (Ireland) Seán O'Brien from (England) Exeter Chiefs
- (Ireland) Eoghan Clarke from Jersey Reds (short-term deal)
- (Ireland) Colm Hogan from (New Zealand) Tasman (short-term deal)
- (Ireland) Oli Jager from (New Zealand) Crusaders

=== Players out ===
- (Scotland) Ben Healy to (Scotland) Edinburgh
- (Scotland) Kiran McDonald to (England) Newcastle Falcons
- (Tonga) Malakai Fekitoa to (Italy) Benetton
- (Ireland) Dan Goggin to (France) Montauban
- (Ireland) Eoin O'Connor to (England) Exeter Chiefs
- (England) Oli Morris to (England) Ampthill
- (Ireland) Keith Earls retired
- (Ireland) Andrew Conway retired
- (South Africa) Keynan Knox released

== Ospreys ==
=== Players in ===
- (Wales) James Ratti from (Wales) Cardiff
- (Wales) Luke Davies from Jersey Reds
- (England) Dom Morris from (England) Saracens (season-long loan)
- (Scotland) Cameron Jones unattached
- (Wales) Ethan Lewis from (England) Saracens
- (Wales) Toby Fricker from (England) Bristol Bears
- (England) James Kenny from (England) Exeter Chiefs (season-long loan)
- (South Africa) Daniel Kasende from (South Africa) Cheetahs (short-term loan)
- (South Africa) Rewan Kruger from (South Africa) Cheetahs (short-term loan)
- (South Africa) Marnus van der Merwe from (South Africa) Cheetahs (short-term loan)

=== Players out ===
- (England) Stephen Myler retired
- (Wales) Tiaan Thomas-Wheeler to (Japan) Toyota Industries Shuttles Aichi
- (Wales) Joe Hawkins to (England) Exeter Chiefs
- (New Zealand) Ethan Roots to (England) Exeter Chiefs
- (Wales) Dan Lydiate to (Wales) Dragons
- (Wales) Bradley Davies retired
- (Wales) Dan Evans retired
- (England) Tom Cowan-Dickie to (England) Plymouth Albion
- (Tonga) Elvis Taione retired
- (Wales) Matthew Aubrey to (Wales) Swansea
- (Wales) Osian Knott to (Wales) Swansea
- (Wales) Scott Baldwin retired
- (Wales) Tomas Francis to (France) Provence
- (Wales) Rhys Webb to (France) Biarritz
- (Wales) Alun Wyn Jones to (France) Toulon
- (Wales) Cai Evans to (Wales) Dragons
- (New Zealand) Michael Collins to (Japan) Toshiba Brave Lupus Tokyo
- (Wales) Gareth Anscombe to (Japan) Tokyo Sungoliath
- (Wales) Sam Cross to (England) Newcastle Falcons

== Scarlets ==
=== Players in ===
- (Wales) Ioan Lloyd from (England) Bristol Bears
- (Wales) Tomi Lewis from Jersey Reds
- (Wales) Eddie James promoted from Academy
- (Scotland) Teddy Leatherbarrow from (England) Loughborough University
- (England) Charlie Titcombe from (England) Loughborough University
- (Scotland) Alex Craig from (England) Gloucester
- (Wales) Efan Jones from (Wales) RGC 1404
- (Wales) Taine Plumtree from (New Zealand) Blues
- (Wales) Ed Scragg from (England) London Irish
- (Wales) Joe Jones from (England) Sale Sharks
- (South Africa) Eduan Swart from (South Africa) Pumas
- (South Africa) Jarrod Taylor from (South Africa) Stormers

=== Players out ===
- (Scotland) Javan Sebastian to (Scotland) Edinburgh
- (Tonga) Sione Kalamafoni to (France) Vannes
- (Wales) Dane Blacker to (Wales) Dragons
- (Wales) Alex Jeffries retired
- (England) Tom Price released
- (Wales) Lewis Rawlins released
- (Wales) Aaron Shingler retired
- (Wales) Corey Baldwin to (Wales) Dragons
- (Wales) Iestyn Rees to (England) Ampthill
- (Wales) Griff Evans to (England) Ampthill
- (Wales) Harri Williams to (England) Ampthill
- (Wales) Dafydd Hughes to Jersey Reds
- (Wales) Phil Price to (Wales) Bridgend Ravens
- (Wales) Rhys Patchell to (New Zealand) Highlanders
- (Wales) WillGriff John to (France) Racing 92
- (Wales) Taylor Davies to (Wales) Llandovery
- (Wales) Leigh Halfpenny to (New Zealand) Crusaders
- (Wales) Samson Lee retired
- (Wales) Iwan Shenton to (England) Ampthill (season-long loan)
- (Wales) Johnny McNicholl to (New Zealand) Crusaders
- (Wales) Ken Owens retired

== Sharks ==
=== Players in ===
- (South Africa) Vincent Koch from (France) Stade Français
- (South Africa) Siya Masuku from (South Africa) Cheetahs
- (South Africa) Diego Appollis from (South Africa) Pumas
- (South Africa) George Cronjé from (South Africa) Cheetahs
- (South Africa) Ig Prinsloo from (South Africa) Pumas
- (South Africa) Coenie Oosthuizen from (England) Sale Sharks
- (South Africa) Aphiwe Dyantyi unattached
- (South Africa) Francois Hougaard from (England) Saracens (short-term deal)
- (New Zealand) Joel Hintz from (New Zealand) Hawke's Bay

=== Players out ===
- (South Africa) Siya Kolisi to (France) Racing 92
- (South Africa) Thaakir Abrahams to (France) Lyon
- (South Africa) Carlü Sadie to (France) Bordeaux
- (Australia) Ben Tapuai to (France) Bordeaux
- (South Africa) Thomas du Toit to (England) Bath
- (South Africa) Henco Venter to (Scotland) Glasgow Warriors
- (South Africa) Thembelani Bholi to (France) Valence Romans
- (South Africa) Mpilo Gumede to (South Africa) Bulls
- (South Africa) Khutha Mchunu to (South Africa) Bulls
- (South Africa) Fred Zeilinga to (France) Bourg-en-Bresse
- (South Africa) Ockie Barnard to (Japan) Saitama Wild Knights
- (South Africa) Rohan Janse van Rensburg to (Japan) Yokohama Canon Eagles
- (South Africa) Hyron Andrews to (England) Sale Sharks (short-term deal)

== Stormers ==
=== Players in ===
- (South Africa) Sti Sithole from (South Africa) Lions
- (South Africa) Lizo Gqoboka from (South Africa) Bulls
- (England) Ben Loader from (England) London Irish
- (South Africa) Hendré Stassen unattached
- (South Africa) Courtnall Skosan from (England) Northampton Saints
- (South Africa) Warrick Gelant from (France) Racing 92
- (South Africa) Wandisile Simelane from (South Africa) Bulls

=== Players out ===
- (South Africa) Steven Kitshoff to (Ireland) Ulster
- (South Africa) Ernst van Rhyn to (England) Sale Sharks
- (South Africa) Marvin Orie to (France) Perpignan
- (South Africa) Kade Wolhuter to (South Africa) Lions (season-long loan)
- (South Africa) Cornel Smit to (South Africa) Bulls
- (South Africa) Jarrod Taylor to (Wales) Scarlets

== Ulster ==
=== Players in ===
- (South Africa) Steven Kitshoff from (South Africa) Stormers
- (Zimbabwe) Dave Ewers from (England) Exeter Chiefs
- (Ireland) Ben Carson promoted from Academy
- (Ireland) Reuben Crothers promoted from Academy
- (Ireland) James McCormick promoted from Academy
- (Ireland) Conor McKee promoted from Academy
- (Ireland) Harry Sheridan promoted from Academy
- (Ireland) James French unattached
- (Ireland) Ben Griffin from (Ireland) Clontarf
- (Ireland) Greg McGrath from Jersey Reds (short-term deal)

=== Players out ===
- (Ireland) Frank Bradshaw Ryan to (France) Montauban
- (Ireland) Jordi Murphy retired
- (Ireland) Rob Lyttle released
- (Ireland) Craig Gilroy released
- (New Zealand) Declan Moore to (Ireland) Connacht (season-long loan)
- (Ireland) Michael McDonald to (Ireland) Connacht (season-long loan)
- (Australia) Sam Carter to (England) Leicester Tigers
- (South Africa) Gareth Milasinovich to (France) Valence Romans
- (Samoa) Jeffery Toomaga-Allen to (Australia) Queensland Reds
- (Ireland) Ian Madigan retired
- (Scotland) Rory Sutherland to (France) Oyonnax
- (South Africa) Duane Vermeulen retired

== Zebre Parma ==
=== Players in ===
- (Italy) Jake Polledri from (England) Gloucester
- (Wales) Ben Cambriani from (England) Ampthill
- (Tonga) Fetuli Paea from (New Zealand) Highlanders
- (Italy) Nicola Piantella from (Italy) Benetton
- (Italy) Filippo Bozzoni from (Italy) Calvisano
- (New Zealand) Scott Gregory from (New Zealand) Highlanders
- (Italy) Giovanni Montemauri from (Italy) Rovigo Delta
- (Argentina) Bautista Stavile from (Italy) Rovigo Delta
- (Italy) Tommaso Di Bartolomeo from (Italy) Petrarca
- (South Africa) Liam Zocchi-Dommann from (South Africa) Sharks
- (Italy) Danilo Fischetti from (England) London Irish
- (Italy) Matteo Canali from (Italy) Petrarca
- (South Africa) Dylan de Leeuw from (South Africa) Western Province
- (Argentina) Thomas Dominguez from (Italy) Valorugby Emilia (short-term deal)
- (Italy) Luca Morisi from (England) London Irish
- (Scotland) Steven Longwell from Jersey Reds
- (New Zealand) Josh Kaifa from (New Zealand) Hawke's Bay

=== Players out ===
- (Italy) Johan Meyer retired
- (South Africa) Dennis Visser to (France) Narbonne
- (England) Matt Kvesic to (England) Coventry
- (South Africa) Erich Cronjé to (South Africa) Lions
- (South Africa) Richard Kriel to (South Africa) Lions
- (England) Chris Cook released
- (South Africa) Jacques du Toit released
- (South Africa) MJ Pelser released
- (South Africa) Jan Uys released
- (South Africa) Kobus van Wyk released
- (Italy) Joshua Furno to (France) Dax
- (Australia) Joey Caputo to (Italy) Petrarca
- (Italy) Mattia Mazzanti to (Italy) Valorugby Emilia
- (United States) Tommaso Boni to (United States) Old Glory DC
- (Scotland) Steven Longwell to (England) Bristol Bears
- (Italy) Gabriele Venditti to (Italy) Calvisano
- (Italy) Antonio Rizzi retired
- (Italy) Nicolò Teneggi to (Italy) Rovigo Delta
- (Italy) Jake Polledri retired
- (Italy) Nicola Piantella to (Italy) Fiamme Oro
- (Italy) Daniele Rimpelli to (Italy) Valorugby Emilia

== See also ==
- List of 2023–24 Premiership Rugby transfers
- List of 2023–24 RFU Championship transfers
- List of 2023–24 Super Rugby transfers
- List of 2023–24 Top 14 transfers
- List of 2023–24 Rugby Pro D2 transfers
- List of 2023–24 Major League Rugby transfers
