= List of 2020–21 Pro14 transfers =

This is a list of player transfers involving Pro14 rugby union teams between 12 March 2020 and the end of the 2020–21 season. Unlike in previous seasons where the bulk of player transfers occurred between seasons, a large number of player transfers instead took place mid-season due to the disruption caused by the coronavirus pandemic.

== Benetton ==
=== Players in ===
- (Italy) Callum Braley from (England) Gloucester
- (Italy) Niccolò Cannone from (Italy) Petrarca Padova
- (Argentina) Joaquin Riera from (Italy) Petrarca Padova
- (Italy) Luca Petrozzi from (Italy) San Donà
- (Italy) Edoardo Padovani from (Italy) Zebre
- (Argentina) Ivan Nemer from (Italy) Rugby Casale
- (Italy) Paolo Garbisi from (Italy) Petrarca Padova
- (Argentina) Thomas Gallo from (Paraguay) Olimpia Lions
- (Italy) Gianmarco Lucchesi from (Italy) Lions Amaranto Livorno
- (England) Zac Nearchou from (England) Wasps (season-long loan)
- (South Africa) Corniel Els from (South Africa) Bulls

=== Players out ===
- (Italy) Giuseppe Di Stefano to (Italy) Fiamme Oro
- (Italy) Antonio Rizzi to (Italy) Zebre
- (Italy) Tito Tebaldi to (Italy) Petrarca Padova
- (Italy) Alessandro Zanni retired
- (Italy) Dean Budd retired
- (Italy) Marco Fuser to (England) Newcastle Falcons
- (Tonga) Nasi Manu to (New Zealand) Otago
- (Italy) Engjel Makelara to (Italy) Petrarca Padova
- (Italy) Ian McKinley retired
- (Ireland) Ian Keatley to (Scotland) Glasgow Warriors
- (South Africa) Eli Snyman to (England) Leicester Tigers

== Bulls ==
The Bulls will join the Pro14 for the Pro14 Rainbow Cup having departed Super Rugby. All signings and departures listed have occurred following the conclusion of the Super Rugby Unlocked competition.

=== Players in ===
- (South Africa) Marcell Coetzee from (Ireland) Ulster
- (Democratic Republic of the Congo) Madosh Tambwe from (South Africa) Sharks
- (South Africa) Henco Beukes from (South Africa) Blue Bulls U21
- (South Africa) Jandre Burger from (South Africa) Blue Bulls U21
- (South Africa) Werner Gouws from (South Africa) Blue Bulls U21
- (South Africa) Keagan Johannes from (South Africa) Blue Bulls
- (South Africa) Dawid Kellerman from (South Africa) Blue Bulls
- (South Africa) Richard Kriel from (South Africa) Blue Bulls U21
- (South Africa) Jaco Labuschagne from (South Africa) Blue Bulls U21
- (South Africa) Jay-Cee Nel from (South Africa) Blue Bulls
- (South Africa) Marnus Potgieter from (South Africa) Blue Bulls
- (South Africa) WJ Steenkamp from (South Africa) Blue Bulls
- (South Africa) Janko Swanepoel from (South Africa) Blue Bulls
- (South Africa) Janco Uys from (South Africa) Blue Bulls U21
- (South Africa) Zak Burger from (South Africa) Griquas
- (South Africa) Mhleli Dlamini from (South Africa) Crusaders
- (South Africa) James Verity-Amm from (South Africa) Griquas
- (South Africa) Diego Appollis from (South Africa) Blue Bulls U21
- (South Africa) Reinhardt Ludwig from (South Africa) Blue Bulls U21
- (South Africa) Simphiwe Matanzima returned from injury
- (South Africa) Raynard Roets from (South Africa) Blue Bulls U21
- (South Africa) Harold Vorster from (Japan) Panasonic Wild Knights
- (South Africa) Robert Hunt from (South Africa) Ikey Tigers
- (South Africa) Sidney Tobias unattached

=== Players out ===
- (South Africa) Juandré Kruger released
- (South Africa) Dayan van der Westhuizen to (Japan) Hino Red Dolphins
- (South Africa) Corniel Els to (Italy) Benetton
- (South Africa) Jason Jenkins returned to (Japan) Toyota Verblitz
- (South Africa) Jade Stighling to (South Africa) Blue Bulls
- (South Africa) Marcel van der Merwe to (France) La Rochelle (short-term deal)

== Cardiff Blues ==
=== Players in ===
- (Wales) Luke Scully from (England) Worcester Warriors
- (Wales) Cory Hill from (Wales) Dragons
- (Wales) Rhys Carré from (England) Saracens
- (Wales) Will Davies-King promoted from Academy
- (Wales) Mason Grady promoted from Academy
- (Wales) Iestyn Harris promoted from Academy
- (Wales) Alun Lawrence promoted from Academy
- (Wales) Max Llewellyn promoted from Academy
- (Wales) Teddy Williams promoted from Academy
- (Wales) Ellis Bevan from (Wales) Cardiff Metropolitan University
- (Wales) Rowan Jenkins from (Wales) Aberavon (short-term deal)

=== Players out ===
- (Wales) Macauley Cook to Jersey Reds
- (Wales) James Down to (Russia) Lokomotiv Penza
- (New Zealand) Nick Williams retired
- (Wales) Kieron Assiratti to (England) Bristol Bears (short-term loan)
- (Samoa) Filo Paulo to (New Zealand) Manawatu
- (Wales) Rhys Davies released
- (England) Ryan Edwards returned to (England) Bristol Bears
- (Wales) Callun James released
- (Wales) Alex Varney released
- (Wales) Dan Fish to (Wales) Cardiff
- (Wales) Ioan Davies to (Wales) Dragons (short-term loan)
- (Wales) Luke Scully to (England) Cornish Pirates (season-long loan)
- (Wales) Ethan Lewis to (England) Saracens (season-long loan)
- (Wales) Scott Andrews to (England) Worcester Warriors (season-long loan)
- (Wales) Rowan Jenkins to (Wales) Aberavon

== Cheetahs ==
The Cheetahs were due to compete in the 2020–21 Pro14, but due to the COVID-19 pandemic, were unable to compete due to travel restrictions and competed in Super Rugby Unlocked instead. They will not compete in the Pro14 Rainbow Cup either. All signings and players under contracted remained with the side or with the Free State Cheetahs for Super Rugby Unlocked or the 2020–21 Currie Cup Premier Division unless noted below.

=== Players out ===
- (South Africa) Joseph Dweba to (France) Bordeaux
- (South Africa) Walt Steenkamp to (South Africa) Bulls
- (South Africa) Gerhard Olivier retired
- (South Africa) Sintu Manjezi to (South Africa) Bulls
- (South Africa) Justin Basson retired
- (South Africa) Louis Fouché retired
- (South Africa) Rabz Maxwane to (South Africa) Lions
- (South Africa) Jasper Wiese to (England) Leicester Tigers
- (South Africa) Benhard Janse van Rensburg to (Japan) NEC Green Rockets
- (Zimbabwe) Tapiwa Mafura to (South Africa) Pumas
- (South Africa) Erich de Jager to (United States) New England Free Jacks
- (South Africa) Dian Badenhorst to (South Africa) Pumas
- (South Africa) Daniel Maartens to (South Africa) Pumas
- (South Africa) Luan de Bruin to (England) Leicester Tigers
- (South Africa) JP du Preez to (England) Sale Sharks
- (South Africa) Reinach Venter to (France) Clermont
- (South Africa) Tian Schoeman to (England) Bath
- (South Africa) Jacques du Toit to (England) Bath
- (South Africa) Boan Venter to (Scotland) Edinburgh

== Connacht ==
=== Players in ===
- (Ireland) Sammy Arnold from (Ireland) Munster
- (Ireland) Jack Aungier from (Ireland) Leinster
- (Ireland) Óisín Dowling from (Ireland) Leinster
- (Ireland) Conor Oliver from (Ireland) Munster
- (Ireland) Conor Dean promoted from Academy
- (Ireland) Jordan Duggan promoted from Academy
- (Ireland) Seán Masterson promoted from Academy
- (Ireland) Niall Murray promoted from Academy
- (Ireland) Colm Reilly promoted from Academy
- (Ireland) Peter Sullivan promoted from Academy
- (Ireland) Alex Wootton from (Ireland) Munster (season-long loan)
- Ben O'Donnell from Australia Sevens
- (New Zealand) Abraham Papali'i from (New Zealand) Bay of Plenty
- (Ireland) Cormac Daly from (Ireland) Clontarf

=== Players out ===
- (Australia) Colby Fainga'a to (France) Lyon
- (New Zealand) Tom McCartney retired
- (Ireland) Robin Copeland to (France) Soyaux Angoulême
- (Ireland) Rory Burke released
- (Ireland) Darragh Leader released
- (Ireland) Angus Lloyd retired
- (Ireland) Conor Hayes released
- (Ireland) Hugh Lane released
- (Ireland) Mikey Wilson released
- (Australia) Kyle Godwin to (Australia) Western Force
- (England) Joe Maksymiw to (Wales) Dragons
- (Australia) David Horwitz to (Australia) Randwick
- (Ireland) Niyi Adeolokun to (England) Bristol Bears
- (Ireland) Peter McCabe to (England) Bristol Bears
- (Ireland) Eoin McKeon retired
- (Ireland) Luke Carty to (United States) LA Giltinis
- (Ireland) Stephen Kerins to (England) Bristol Bears (short-term loan)

== Dragons ==
=== Players in ===
- (Wales) Jonah Holmes from (England) Leicester Tigers
- (Wales) Nick Tompkins from (England) Saracens (season-long loan)
- (England) Joe Maksymiw from (Ireland) Connacht
- (Wales) Ben Fry promoted from Academy
- (Wales) Harry Fry from (England) Gloucester
- (England) Luke Baldwin from (England) Worcester Warriors (season-long loan)
- (Wales) Jamie Roberts from (South Africa) Stormers
- (England) Greg Bateman from (England) Leicester Tigers
- (Ireland) Conor Maguire unattached (short-term deal)
- (Wales) Joe Thomas from (England) Leicester Tigers (short-term deal)
- (Wales) Ben Carter promoted from Academy
- (Wales) Evan Lloyd promoted from Academy
- (Wales) Aneurin Owen promoted from Academy
- (Wales) Luke Yendle promoted from Academy
- (Wales) Dan Baker from (France) Mont-de-Marsan (short-term deal)
- (Argentina) Gonzalo Bertranou from (Argentina) Jaguares (short-term deal)
- (Wales) Ioan Davies from (Wales) Cardiff Blues (short-term loan)
- (Wales) Will Reed promoted from Academy

=== Players out ===
- (Wales) Nic Cudd released
- (Wales) James Sheekey released
- (Wales) Tom Hoppe released
- (Wales) James McCarthy released
- (Wales) Tyler Morgan to (Wales) Scarlets
- (New Zealand) Jacob Botica to (France) Rennes
- (Wales) Cory Hill to (Wales) Cardiff Blues
- (Wales) Dafydd Buckland to (Wales) Pontypridd
- (Samoa) Brandon Nansen to (France) Brive
- (Wales) Will Griffiths to (Wales) Newport
- (Ireland) Conor Maguire to (England) Gloucester
- (Wales) Connor Edwards to (England) Doncaster Knights (season-long loan)
- (Wales) Nick Tompkins returned to (England) Saracens
- (Wales) Joe Thomas to (United States) Houston SaberCats
- (Wales) Arwel Robson to (England) Cornish Pirates (short-term loan)

== Edinburgh ==
=== Players in ===
- (South Africa) Jordan Venter from (South Africa) Paul Roos Gymnasium
- (Fiji) Lee Roy Atalifo from Jersey Reds
- (Australia) Matt Gordon from (England) London Scottish
- (Scotland) Andrew Davidson from (Scotland) Glasgow Warriors
- (Scotland) Marshall Sykes from (Scotland) Ayrshire Bulls
- (Australia) Sam Kitchen from (Scotland) Ayrshire Bulls
- (Scotland) Connor Boyle promoted from Academy
- (Scotland) Rory Darge promoted from Academy
- (Scotland) Sam Grahamslaw from (Scotland) Watsonians
- (South Africa) Andries Ferreira from (South Africa) Bulls
- (South Africa) Boan Venter from (South Africa) Cheetahs
- (England) Freddie Owsley from (England) Bristol Bears

=== Players out ===
- (Italy) Pietro Ceccarelli to (France) Brive
- (South Africa) Jason Baggott released
- (Scotland) Matt Scott to (England) Leicester Tigers
- (England) Stan South returned to (England) Exeter Chiefs
- (Scotland) Callum Hunter-Hill to (England) Saracens
- (New Zealand) Simon Hickey to (New Zealand) Hurricanes
- (Scotland) Dougie Fife to (United States) New England Free Jacks
- (Scotland) John Barclay retired
- (Scotland) Sam Thomson to (Japan) Toshiba Brave Lupus
- (Scotland) Cameron Fenton to (Scotland) Heriot's
- (Scotland) Jamie Bhatti to (England) Bath
- (Australia) Matt Gordon to (England) Ealing Trailfinders
- (New Zealand) Korie Winters released
- (Scotland) Fraser McKenzie retired
- (Scotland) Rory Darge to (Scotland) Glasgow Warriors
- (Australia) Sam Kitchen released
- (South Africa) Nic Groom to (England) London Irish

== Glasgow Warriors ==
=== Players in ===
- (Scotland) Richie Gray from (France) Toulouse
- (Argentina) Enrique Pieretto from (England) Exeter Chiefs
- (Scotland) Rufus McLean promoted from Academy
- (Scotland) Hamish Bain from (France) Stade Niçois
- (Australia) Dylan Evans from (Wales) Scarlets (short-term loan)
- (Tonga) Fotu Lokotui from (England) Doncaster Knights
- (Samoa) TJ Ioane from (England) London Irish (loan)
- (Ireland) Ian Keatley from (Italy) Benetton
- (Australia) Dylan Evans from (Wales) Scarlets (short-term loan)
- (New Zealand) Cole Forbes from (New Zealand) Bay of Plenty
- (Scotland) Rory Darge from (Scotland) Edinburgh

=== Players out ===
- (Scotland) Jonny Gray to (England) Exeter Chiefs
- (Scotland) Cameron Henderson to (England) Leicester Tigers
- (Scotland) Rory Hughes released
- (Scotland) Ruaridh Jackson retired
- (Scotland) Andrew Davidson to (Scotland) Edinburgh
- (Scotland) Tim Swinson to (England) Saracens
- (Tonga) Siua Halanukonuka to (France) Perpignan
- (Scotland) Matt Smith retired
- (Australia) Nick Frisby to (Australia) Western Force
- (South Africa) Petrus du Plessis retired
- (England) Charlie Capps released
- (Fiji) Jale Vakaloloma released
- (New Zealand) Callum Gibbins to (United States) Old Glory DC
- (Scotland) Adam Ashe to (United States) LA Giltinis
- (Canada) D. T. H. van der Merwe to (United States) LA Giltinis
- (Scotland) Glenn Bryce to (United States) LA Giltinis
- (South Africa) Brandon Thomson to (South Africa) Free State Cheetahs
- (England) Will Hurd to (England) Leicester Tigers
- (Scotland) Adam Nicol to Jersey Reds
- (Scotland) Tommy Seymour retired

== Leinster ==
=== Players in ===
- (Ireland) Ryan Baird promoted from Academy
- (Ireland) Harry Byrne promoted from Academy
- (Ireland) Jack Dunne promoted from Academy
- (Ireland) Tommy O'Brien promoted from Academy
- (Ireland) Dan Sheehan promoted from Academy
- (England) Ciaran Parker from Jersey Reds (three-month loan)
- (Ireland) Greg McGrath from (Ireland) Lansdowne (short-term deal)
- (Ireland) Jamie Osborne from (Ireland) Naas (short-term deal)
- (Ireland) Marcus Hanan from (Ireland) Clane (short-term deal)

=== Players out ===
- (Ireland) Fergus McFadden retired
- (Ireland) Jack Aungier to (Ireland) Connacht
- (Ireland) Óisín Dowling to (Ireland) Connacht
- (United States) Roman Salanoa to (Ireland) Munster
- (Ireland) Gavin Mullin released
- (Ireland) Bryan Byrne to (England) Bristol Bears
- (Ireland) Barry Daly retired
- (Ireland) Rob Kearney to (Australia) Western Force
- (Australia) Joe Tomane to (Japan) Ricoh Black Rams
- (Ireland) Ben Murphy to (Ireland) Munster (7-week deal)
- (Ireland) Paddy Patterson to (Ireland) Munster (short-term deal)

== Lions ==
The Lions will join the Pro14 for the Pro14 Rainbow Cup having departed Super Rugby. All signings and departures listed have occurred following the conclusion of the Super Rugby Unlocked competition.

=== Players in ===
- (South Africa) Morné Brandon from (South Africa) Golden Lions U21
- (South Africa) Jarod Cairns from (South Africa) Golden Lions U21
- (South Africa) Aidynn Cupido from (South Africa) Golden Lions U21
- (South Africa) Izan Esterhuizen from (South Africa) Golden Lions U21
- (South Africa) Jordan Hendrikse from (South Africa) Golden Lions U21
- (South Africa) James Mollentze from (South Africa) Golden Lions
- (South Africa) Banele Mthenjane from (South Africa) Golden Lions U21
- (South Africa) Mandisi Mthiyane from (South Africa) Golden Lions U21
- (South Africa) Lindo Ncusane from (South Africa) Golden Lions U21
- (South Africa) Luke Rossouw from (South Africa) Golden Lions U21
- (South Africa) Sibusiso Sangweni from (South Africa) Golden Lions U21
- (Democratic Republic of the Congo) Ngia Selengbe from (South Africa) Golden Lions U21
- (South Africa) Sibusiso Shongwe from (South Africa) Golden Lions U21
- (South Africa) Ruhan Straeuli from (South Africa) Golden Lions U21
- (South Africa) Boitumelo Tsatsane from (South Africa) Golden Lions U21
- (South Africa) Emmanuel Tshituka from (South Africa) Golden Lions U21
- (South Africa) Dameon Venter from (South Africa) Golden Lions
- (South Africa) Fred Zeilinga from (Japan) Canon Eagles

=== Players out ===
- (South Africa) Marvin Orie to (South Africa) Stormers
- (South Africa) Dylan Smith to (France) Stade Français
- (South Africa) Elton Jantjies to (France) Pau (short-term deal)
- (South Africa) Wiehahn Herbst to (South Africa) Sharks (short-term deal)

== Munster ==
=== Players in ===
- (South Africa) Keynan Knox promoted from Academy
- (Ireland) Liam Coombes promoted from Academy
- (Ireland) Alex McHenry promoted from Academy
- (Ireland) Jack O'Sullivan promoted from Academy
- (South Africa) Damian de Allende from (Japan) Panasonic Wild Knights
- (England) Matt Gallagher from (England) Saracens
- (South Africa) RG Snyman from (Japan) Honda Heat
- (United States) Roman Salanoa from (Ireland) Leinster
- (Ireland) Diarmuid Barron promoted from Academy
- (Ireland) Callum Reid from (Ireland) Ulster (6-week loan)
- (Ireland) Ben Murphy from (Ireland) Leinster sub-academy (7-week deal)
- (Ireland) Ethan Coughlan from (Ireland) Ennis (short-term deal)
- (Ireland) Paddy Patterson from (Ireland) Leinster (short-term deal)

=== Players out ===
- (South Africa) Arno Botha to (South Africa) Bulls
- (Ireland) Sammy Arnold to (Ireland) Connacht
- (Ireland) Conor Oliver to (Ireland) Connacht
- (Ireland) Alan Tynan released
- (Ireland) Seán O'Connor to Jersey Reds
- (England) Ciaran Parker to Jersey Reds
- (Ireland) Alex Wootton to (Ireland) Connacht (season-long loan)
- (Ireland) Darren O'Shea to (France) Vannes
- (Ireland) Jack Stafford to (England) Harlequins
- (Ireland) Corrie Barrett to (England) Bedford Blues
- (Ireland) Darren Sweetnam to (France) La Rochelle
- (Ireland) Eoghan Clarke to Jersey Reds

== Ospreys ==
=== Players in ===
- (Wales) Rhys Webb from (England) Bath
- (Wales) Mat Protheroe from (England) Bristol Bears
- (Wales) Nicky Thomas from (England) Bristol Bears
- (Wales) Rhys Davies from (England) Bath
- (England) Stephen Myler from (England) London Irish
- (Ireland) Will Hickey from (Ireland) St Michael's College
- (Samoa) Jordan Lay from (New Zealand) Bay of Plenty
- (New Zealand) Ethan Roots from (New Zealand) North Harbour
- (England) Todd Gleave from (England) Gloucester (season-long loan)

=== Players out ===
- (Wales) James Hook retired
- (Moldova) Gheorghe Gajion to (France) Aurillac
- (Wales) Dan Baker to (France) Mont-de-Marsan
- (Wales) Aled Davies to (England) Saracens
- (England) Ben Glynn released
- (Wales) Will Jones released
- (Wales) Tom Williams released
- (Namibia) Lesley Klim to Jersey Reds
- (Argentina) Guido Volpi to (England) Doncaster Knights (season-long loan)
- (Wales) James King retired
- (Wales) Nicky Thomas to (England) Wasps (short-term loan)
- (Scotland) Darryl Marfo to (England) Leicester Tigers
- (South Africa) Hanno Dirksen to (United States) New Orleans Gold
- (Wales) Scott Otten retired

== Scarlets ==
=== Players in ===
- (Wales) Sam Costelow from (England) Leicester Tigers
- (Wales) Tyler Morgan from (Wales) Dragons
- (Tonga) Sione Kalamafoni from (England) Leicester Tigers
- (England) Johnny Williams from (England) Newcastle Falcons
- (Wales) Morgan Jones promoted from Academy
- (Wales) Jac Price promoted from Academy
- (Wales) Joe Roberts promoted from Academy
- (Wales) Tom Rogers promoted from Academy
- (England) Will Homer from Jersey Reds
- (Wales) Aled Brew from (England) Bath (short-term deal)
- (South Africa) Pieter Scholtz from (South Africa) Southern Kings

=== Players out ===
- (Wales) Corey Baldwin to (England) Exeter Chiefs
- (Wales) Tom James retired
- (Wales) Rhys Fawcett released
- (Wales) Simon Gardiner released
- (Wales) Morgan Williams released
- (Wales) Hadleigh Parkes to (Japan) Panasonic Wild Knights
- (Samoa) Kieron Fonotia to (New Zealand) Tasman
- (Wales) Jonathan Evans retired
- (England) Danny Drake to (England) Gloucester (short-term loan)
- (Australia) Dylan Evans to (Scotland) Glasgow Warriors (short-term loan)
- (Australia) Steve Cummins to (France) Pau
- (Wales) Aled Brew retired
- (Australia) Dylan Evans to (Scotland) Glasgow Warriors (short-term loan)
- (Wales) Joe Roberts to (England) Ampthill (short-term loan)
- (Wales) Shaun Evans to (England) Nottingham (season-long loan)
- (Wales) Harri O'Connor to (England) Nottingham (season-long loan)
- (Wales) Jac Price to (England) Nottingham (season-long loan)
- (Fiji) Tevita Ratuva to (France) Brive

== Sharks ==
The Sharks will join the Pro14 for the Pro14 Rainbow Cup having departed Super Rugby. All signings and departures listed have occurred following the conclusion of the Super Rugby Unlocked competition.

=== Players in ===
- (South Africa) Siya Kolisi from (South Africa) Stormers
- (South Africa) Reniel Hugo from (South Africa) Cheetahs
- (South Africa) Le Roux Roets from (South Africa) Pumas
- (South Africa) Wiehahn Herbst from (South Africa) Lions (short-term deal)
- (South Africa) Lucky Dlepu from (South Africa) Western Province U21
- (South Africa) Rynhardt Jonker from (South Africa) Sharks U21
- (South Africa) Jeandre Labuschagne from (South Africa) Sharks U21
- (South Africa) Ntuthuko Mchunu from (South Africa) Sharks U21
- (South Africa) Makazole Mapimpi returned from (Japan) NTT DoCoMo Red Hurricanes

=== Players out ===
- (South Africa) Tera Mtembu to (United States) New England Free Jacks
- (South Africa) Craig Burden retired
- Zain Davids to South Africa Sevens
- Muller du Plessis to South Africa Sevens
- (South Africa) Lwazi Mvovo retired
- (South Africa) JP Pietersen retired
- (Democratic Republic of the Congo) Madosh Tambwe to (South Africa) Bulls
- (South Africa) Evan Roos to (South Africa) Stormers
- (South Africa) Andrew Evans to (South Africa) Sharks (Currie Cup)
- (Zimbabwe) Cleopas Kundiona to (South Africa) Sharks (Currie Cup)
- (South Africa) Cameron Wright to (South Africa) Sharks (Currie Cup)

== Southern Kings ==
The Southern Kings were due to compete in the 2020–21 Pro14 season, but went into voluntary liquidation in September 2020. They will not compete in the Pro14 Rainbow Cup either. All signings and players under contracted were released following liquidation.

=== Players out ===
- (South Africa) Theo Maree to (South Africa) Griquas
- (South Africa) Howard Mnisi to (South Africa) Cheetahs
- (South Africa) Demetri Catrakilis retired
- (South Africa) Rossouw de Klerk to (France) Bourgoin
- (South Africa) Sarel Pretorius retired
- (South Africa) Masixole Banda to (South Africa) Griquas
- (South Africa) Elrigh Louw to (South Africa) Bulls
- (South Africa) Xandré Vos to (United States) New England Free Jacks
- (South Africa) Cameron Dawson to (South Africa) Cheetahs
- (South Africa) Jacques du Toit to (South Africa) Cheetahs
- (South Africa) Thembelani Bholi to (South Africa) Sharks
- (South Africa) Yaw Penxe to (South Africa) Sharks
- (South Africa) Alandré van Rooyen to (South Africa) Griquas
- (South Africa) CJ Velleman to (South Africa) Griquas
- (South Africa) Bobby de Wee to (England) Ealing Trailfinders
- (South Africa) Erich Cronjé to (South Africa) Pumas
- (South Africa) Ig Prinsloo to (South Africa) Pumas
- (South Africa) Tertius Kruger to (Hong Kong) HKG Sandy Bay
- (South Africa) Aaron Brody to (United Arab Emirates) Phoenix
- (South Africa) Luyolo Dapula to (United States) Rhinos
- (South Africa) Gareth Heidtmann to (United Arab Emirates) Phoenix
- (South Africa) JT Jackson to (South Africa) SX10
- (South Africa) Andell Loubser to (United Arab Emirates) Phoenix
- (South Africa) Eddie Ludick to (United Arab Emirates) Phoenix
- (South Africa) Gavin Mills to (United Arab Emirates) Phoenix
- (South Africa) Pieter Scholtz to (Wales) Scarlets
- (South Africa) Aston Fortuin to (United States) Utah Warriors
- (South Africa) Tiaan Botes to (South Africa) Pumas
- (South Africa) JC Astle to (France) Rouen
- (South Africa) Lupumlo Mguca to (South Africa) Eastern Province Elephants
- (South Africa) Josh Allderman to (South Africa) Eastern Province Elephants
- (South Africa) Christopher Hollis to (South Africa) Eastern Province Elephants
- (South Africa) Robin Stevens to (South Africa) Eastern Province Elephants
- (South Africa) Josiah Twum-Boafo to (South Africa) Eastern Province Elephants
- (South Africa) Courtney Winnaar to (South Africa) Eastern Province Elephants
- (Ireland) Jerry Sexton to (England) Doncaster Knights
- (South Africa) Alulutho Tshakweni to (South Africa) Cheetahs
- (South Africa) Schalk Ferreira to (South Africa) Cheetahs
- (South Africa) Stefan Ungerer to (South Africa) Griquas
- (South Africa) Bader Pretorius to Jersey Reds
- (South Africa) Tienie Burger to (France) Rouen
- (Cameroon) Christian Ambadiang to (France) Nevers
- (South Africa) Tiaan Swanepoel to (South Africa) Madibaz
- (South Africa) Siya Masuku to (South Africa) Cheetahs

== Stormers ==
The Stormers will join the Pro14 for the Pro14 Rainbow Cup having departed Super Rugby. All signings and departures listed have occurred following the conclusion of the Super Rugby Unlocked competition.

=== Players in ===
- (South Africa) Marvin Orie from (South Africa) Lions
- (South Africa) Evan Roos from (South Africa) Sharks
- (South Africa) Willie Engelbrecht from (South Africa) Pumas (season-long loan)
- (South Africa) Lee-Marvin Mazibuko from (South Africa) Western Province
- (South Africa) Ali Vermaak from (South Africa) Western Province
- (South Africa) Adré Smith from (South Africa) Griquas
- (South Africa) Andre-Hugo Venter from (South Africa) Western Province U21
- (South Africa) Rosko Specman from (South Africa) Cheetahs (short-term deal)

=== Players out ===
- (South Africa) Jaco Coetzee to (England) Bath
- (South Africa) Siya Kolisi to (South Africa) Sharks
- (South Africa) Chris van Zyl retired
- (South Africa) Ryno Eksteen released
- (South Africa) JJ Kotze to (South Africa) Western Province
- (South Africa) Matt More to (South Africa) Western Province

== Ulster ==
=== Players in ===
- (Ireland) Stewart Moore promoted from Academy
- (New Zealand) Alby Mathewson unattached
- (Ireland) Ian Madigan from (England) Bristol Bears
- (Wales) Bradley Roberts from Rainey Old Boys, initially as short-term injury cover, later permanent.

=== Players out ===
- (Ireland) Zack McCall released
- (Ireland) Clive Ross released
- (Ireland) Tommy O'Hagan released
- (Ireland) Angus Kernohan to (England) Ealing Trailfinders
- (Ireland) Callum Reid to (Ireland) Munster (6-week loan)
- (South Africa) Marcell Coetzee to (South Africa) Bulls
- (Ireland) Bill Johnston to (England) Ealing Trailfinders (short-term loan)
- (South Africa) Louis Ludik retired

== Zebre ==
=== Players in ===
- (Italy) Antonio Rizzi from (Italy) Benetton
- (Italy) Iacopo Bianchi from (Italy) Fiamme Oro
- (Italy) Nicolò Casilio from (Italy) Calvisano
- (Italy) Giovanni D'Onofrio from (Italy) Fiamme Oro
- (Italy) Matteo Nocera from (Italy) Fiamme Oro
- (Italy) Paolo Pescetto from (Italy) Calvisano
- (Samoa) Potu Leavasa Jr. from (New Zealand) Counties Manukau
- (New Zealand) Charles Alaimalo from (New Zealand) Southland

=== Players out ===
- (Italy) Edoardo Padovani to (Italy) Benetton
- (England) Charlie Walker to (England) Ealing Trailfinders
- (Italy) Roberto Tenga to (Italy) Fiamme Oro
- (Italy) George Biagi retired
- (South Africa) Francois Brummer released
- (Fiji) Apisai Tauyavuca to (United States) Houston SaberCats
- (Fiji) Paula Balekana to (United States) Houston SaberCats

== See also ==
- List of 2020–21 Premiership Rugby transfers
- List of 2020–21 RFU Championship transfers
- List of 2020–21 Super Rugby transfers
- List of 2020–21 Top 14 transfers
- List of 2020–21 Major League Rugby transfers
