= 2016 World Rugby Under 20 Championship =

Tournament details
- Host: England
- Date: 7–25 June 2016
- Teams: 12

Final positions
- Champions: England
- Runner-up: Ireland
- Third place: Argentina
- Fourth place: South Africa

The 2016 World Rugby Under 20 Championship was the ninth annual international rugby union competition for Under 20 national teams. The event was organised in England by rugby's governing body, World Rugby. Twelve nations took part in the tournament, which was held at two venues in Greater Manchester—AJ Bell Stadium in Salford and Manchester City Academy Stadium in Manchester. New Zealand went into the tournament as defending champions. The competition was won by hosts England.

== Teams ==
The following teams participated in the 2016 World Rugby U20 Championship:

Pool	Team	No of Tournaments	Position 2015	Position 2016	Previous best result	Notes
A	Georgia	1	DNP	10th	n/a	Promoted from 2015 World Rugby Under 20 Trophy
A	Ireland	9	7th	2nd	Fourth (2014)	
A	New Zealand	9	1st	5th	Champions (2008, 2009, 2010, 2011, 2015)	
A	Wales	9	6th	7th	Runners-up (2013)	
B	Australia	9	5th	6th	Runners-up (2010)	
B	England	9	2nd	1st	Champions (2013, 2014)	
B	Italy	7	11th	11th	Eleventh (2008, 2011, 2014, 2015)	
B	Scotland	9	8th	8th	Eighth (2015)	
C	Argentina	9	9th	3rd	Fourth (2012)	
C	France	9	4th	9th	Fourth (2011, 2015)	
C	Japan	4	10th	12th	Tenth (2015)	Relegated to 2017 World Rugby Under 20 Trophy
C	South Africa	9	3rd	4th	Champions (2012)	

== Match officials ==
The following officials oversaw the thirty matches:

Referees

- Andrew Brace (Ireland)
- Thomas Charabas (France)
- Graham Cooper (Australia)
- Craig Evans (Wales)
- Cwengile Jadezweni (South Africa)
- Craig Maxwell-Keys (England)
- Elia Rizzo (Italy)
- Juan Sylvestre (Argentina)
- Paul Williams (New Zealand)

Assistant Referees

- Peter Allan (England)
- Paul Dix (England)
- Tom Foley (England)
- Greg Garner (England)
- Andrew Jackson (England)
- Greg MacDonald (England)
- John Meredith (England)
- Matthew O'Grady (England)
- Ian Tempest (England)
- Phil Watters (England)

Television match officials

- Paul Adams (Wales)
- Trevor Fisher (England)
- David Grashoff (England)
- Rowan Kitt (England)
- Keith Lewis (England)
- John Mason (Wales)
- David Rose (England)
- David Sainsbury (England)
- Stuart Terheege (England)
- Geoff Warren (England)

== Pool stage ==
The fixtures were released in December 2015.

Key to colours in group tables
Teams advanced to finals
Teams in the 5–8th place play-offs
Teams in the 9–12th place play-offs

All times are in British Summer Time (UTC+01)

Points were awarded in the Pool Stage via the standard points system:

- 4 points for a win
- 2 points for a draw
- 1 bonus scoring point for scoring 4 or more tries
- 1 bonus losing point for losing by 7 or less points
- 0 points for a loss above 7 points

If at completion of the Pool Stage two or more teams were level on points, the following tiebreakers were applied:

1. The winner of the Match in which the two tied Teams have played each other;
2. The Team which has the best difference between points scored for and points scored against in all its Pool Matches;
3. The Team which has the best difference between tries scored for and tries scored against in all its Pool Matches;
4. The Team which has scored most points in all its Pool Matches;
5. The Team which has scored most tries in all its Pool Matches; and
6. If none of the above produce a result, then it will be resolved with a toss of a coin.

=== Pool A ===
Team	Pld	W	D	L	PF	PA	PD	TF	TA	BP	Pts
Ireland	3	3	0	0	94	56	+38	10	9	1	13
New Zealand	3	2	0	1	97	50	+47	15	4	2	10
Wales	3	1	0	2	52	53	–1	6	5	3	7
Georgia	3	0	0	3	16	100	–84	1	14	1	1

Match 5	7 June 2016	Wales	25–26	Ireland	Academy Stadium, Manchester
	17:30	Try: S. Evans 11' m Giles (2) 16' m, 77' m Morgan-Williams 19' c Con: D. Jones (1/4) 20'; Pen: D. Jones (1/2) 42'	Match details	Try: McBurney 36' m Stockdale (2) 40' c, 67' m Con: Johnston (1/3) 40'; Pen: Johnston (2/2) 44', 51'; Drop: Johnston (1/1) 24'	Referee: (New Zealand) Paul Williams

Match 3	7 June 2016	New Zealand	55–0	Georgia	AJ Bell Stadium, Salford
	19:45	Try: Stevenson 1' c Makene (2) 8' c, 39' m Nock 26' c Lowe (2) 29' m, 53' m M. Jacobson 50' c Tuitama 71' m Moala-Liava'a 80' c Con: Barrett (4/6) 2', 10', 28', 50'; Perofeta (1/3) 80'	Match details		Referee: (Ireland) Andrew Brace

Match 10	11 June 2016	New Zealand	24–33	Ireland	Academy Stadium, Manchester
	13:30	Try: Barrett 6' c Stevenson 24' c Tuitama (2) 51' m, 73' m Con: Barrett (2/4) 7', 24'; Pen: Barrett (0/1)	Match details	Try: Jones 27' c McBurney 34' c Deegan 71' c Con: Johnston (2/2) 28', 35'; McPhillips (1/1) 72'; Pen: Johnston (2/2) 2', 15'; McPhillips (2/2) 46', 78'	Referee: (England) Craig Maxwell-Keys

Match 11	11 June 2016	Wales	10–9	Georgia	Academy Stadium, Manchester
	15:45	Try: Brown 4' c Con: Evans (1/1) 4'; Pen: Evans (1/3) 55'	Match details	Pen: Aprasidze (3/5) 35', 40', 66'	Referee: (Australia) Graham Cooper

Match 17	15 June 2016	Ireland	35–7	Georgia	Academy Stadium, Manchester
	17:30	Try: Keenan 7' c McPhillips 35' c Kennedy 58' m Porter 79' c Con: McPhillips (2/3) 8', 36'; Connon (1/1) 80'; Pen: McPhillips (3/3) 13', 16', 53'	Match details	Try: Lobzhanidze 4' c Con: Modzgvrishvili (1/1) 5'	Referee: (Wales) Craig Evans

Match 14	15 June 2016	New Zealand	18–17	Wales	AJ Bell Stadium, Salford
	17:30	Try: Nock 40' c Stevenson 57' m Con: Barrett (1/2) 40'; Pen: Barrett (2/2) 18', 79'	Match details	Try: Thomas 8' m Con: D. Jones (0/1); Pen: D. Jones (4/4) 2', 12', 33', 48'; McBryde (0/1)	Referee: (South Africa) Cwengile Jadezweni

=== Pool B ===
Team	Pld	W	D	L	PF	PA	PD	TF	TA	BP	Pts
England	3	3	0	0	109	23	+86	12	2	2	14
Scotland	3	2	0	1	42	73	–31	6	9	1	9
Australia	3	1	0	2	61	42	+19	7	4	3	7
Italy	3	0	0	3	39	113	–74	5	15	0	0

Match 2	7 June 2016	Australia	10–15	Scotland	AJ Bell Stadium, Salford
	17:30	Try: Rodda 24' c Con: Mason (1/1) 25'; Pen: Mason (1/2) 55'	Match details	Try: Fagerson 46' m Graham 63' c Con: Hastings (1/2) 64'; Pen: Hastings (1/1) 20'	Referee: (France) Thomas Charabas

Match 6	7 June 2016	England	48–10	Italy	Academy Stadium, Manchester
	19:45	Try: Nott 8' c Robinson 31' c Marchant 51' c Penalty try 59' c Singleton 63' c Mercer 68' c Con: Brophy-Clews (1/1) 10'; Mallinder (3/3) 32', 52', 60'; Malins (2/2) 64', 69'; Pen: Mallinder (2/2) 37', 44'	Match details	Try: Masselli 77' c Con: Mantelli (1/1) 78'; Drop: Mantelli (1/1) 19'	Referee: (Argentina) Juan Sylvestre

Match 7	11 June 2016	Australia	38–10	Italy	AJ Bell Stadium, Salford
	13:30	Try: Kennewell 33' c Tui 53' c Jurd 61' c Vui 77' c Mason 80' c Con: Mason (5/5) 34', 54', 63', 79', 80'; Pen: Mason (1/2) 41'	Match details	Try: Minozzi 27'; Con: Mantelli (1/1) 27'; Pen: Mantelli (1/1) 10'	Referee: (South Africa) Cwengile Jadezweni

Match 12	11 June 2016	England	44–0	Scotland	Academy Stadium, Manchester
	18:00	Try: J. Walker 21' c Evans 53' c Williams 55' c Singleton 75' c Malins 80' c Con: Mallinder (3/3) 21', 54', 56'; Malins (2/2) 77', 80'; Pen: Mallinder (2/3) 10', 17'; Malins (1/1) 78'	Match details		Referee: (Ireland) Andrew Brace

Match 16	15 June 2016	Scotland	27–19	Italy	Academy Stadium, Manchester
	15:15	Try: McCallum 17' m Nairn 50' c Kinghorn 54' m Miller 66' c Con: Hastings (2/4) 51', 67'; Pen: Hastings (1/2) 43'	Match details	Try: Licata 30' c Rimpelli 62' c Bruno 76' m Con: Mantelli (2/3) 31', 62'	Referee: (France) Thomas Charabas

Match 15	15 June 2016	England	17–13	Australia	AJ Bell Stadium, Salford
	19:45	Try: Marchant 52' m Pen: Mallinder (4/6) 3', 31', 65', 73'	Match details	Try: Maddocks 1' c Con: Mason (1/1) 1'; Pen: Mason (2/2) 27', 38'	Referee: (New Zealand) Paul Williams (rugby union)

=== Pool C ===
Team	Pld	W	D	L	PF	PA	PD	TF	TA	BP	Pts
Argentina	3	3	0	0	82	48	+34	8	6	1	13
South Africa	3	2	0	1	112	69	+43	14	8	3	11
France	3	1	0	2	92	78	+14	13	9	2	6
Japan	3	0	0	3	53	144	–91	8	20	0	0

Match 1	7 June 2016	France	15–24	Argentina	AJ Bell Stadium, Salford
	15:15	Try: Dupont 10' m Penalty try 51' c Con: Belleau (1/2) 52'; Pen: Belleau (1/1) 25'	Match details	Try: Bazán 71' c Bravin 74' m Con: Elias (1/2) 73'; Pen: Miotti (2/4) 2', 16'; Elias (2/2) 62', 63'	Referee: (Australia) Graham Cooper

Match 4	7 June 2016	South Africa	59–19	Japan	Academy Stadium, Manchester
	15:15	Try: Davids (2) 9' c, 44' c Jackson 36' c Ward (2) 41' c, 48' c Libbok 63' c Mafuma 70' c Sadie 80' c Con: Bosch (8/8) 10', 37', 42', 45', 49', 64', 71', 80'; Pen: Bosch (1/1) 55'	Match details	Try: Moeakiola (3) 19' c, 25' c, 30' m Con: Kanai (2/3) 21', 25'	Referee: (Italy) Elia Rizzo

Match 8	11 June 2016	France	46–14	Japan	AJ Bell Stadium, Salford
	15:45	Try: Mauvaka 22' c Couilloud 25' c Penaud 41' m Dupont (2) 56' m, 79' c Nicoué 71' c Buros 80' m Con: Belleau (2/4) 24', 25'; Séguy (2/3) 73', 79'; Pen: Belleau (1/1) 15'	Match details	Try: Takano 7' c Tatafu 55'; Con: Moeakiola (2/2) 8', 56'	Referee: (Argentina) Juan Sylvestre

Match 9	11 June 2016	South Africa	13–19	Argentina	AJ Bell Stadium, Salford
	18:00	Try: Van den Berg 63' c Con: Bosch (1/1) 64'; Pen: Bosch (2/5) 3', 29'	Match details	Try: Malanos 40' c Con: Miotti (1/1) 40'; Pen: Miotti (4/5) 10', 35', 47', 59'	Referee: (Wales) Craig Evans

Match 13	15 June 2016	Argentina	39–20	Japan	AJ Bell Stadium, Salford
	15:15	Try: Barros Sosa (2) 17' m, 24' c Kremer 42' c Romanini 56' c Mallia 64' c Con: Miotti (5/6) 25', 35', 44', 57', 66'; Pen: Elias (1/1) 74'	Match details	Try: Moeakiola 2' m Tatafu (2) 5' m, 62' c Con: Moeakiola (1/3) 63'; Pen: Moeakiola (1/2) 32'	Referee: (Italy) Elia Rizzo

Match 18	15 June 2016	South Africa	40–31	France	Academy Stadium, Manchester
	19:45	Try: Papier 15' c Davids 33' m Van der Merwe 44' c Libbok 61' m Bosch 65' c Con: Bosch (3/5) 15', 45', 65'; Pen: Bosch (3/3) 7', 11', 67'	Match details	Try: Tanguy 4' c Simutoga 25' c Buros 28' c Ngandebe 79' c Con: Belleau (4/4) 5', 27', 29', 79'; Pen: Belleau (1/1) 19'	Referee: (England) Craig Maxwell-Keys

=== Current combined standings ===
Overall Standings
Pool Pos	Pos	Team	Pld	W	D	L	PF	PA	PD	TF	TA	BP	Pts
B1	1	England	3	3	0	0	109	23	+86	12	2	2	14
A1	2	Ireland	3	3	0	0	94	56	+38	10	9	1	13
C1	3	Argentina	3	3	0	0	82	48	+34	8	6	1	13
C2	4	South Africa	3	2	0	1	112	69	+43	14	8	3	11
A2	5	New Zealand	3	2	0	1	97	50	+47	15	4	2	10
B2	6	Scotland	3	2	0	1	42	73	–31	6	9	1	9
B3	7	Australia	3	1	0	2	61	42	+19	7	4	3	7
A3	8	Wales	3	1	0	2	52	53	–1	6	5	3	7
C3	9	France	3	1	0	2	92	78	+14	13	9	2	6
A4	10	Georgia	3	0	0	3	16	100	–84	1	14	1	1
B4	11	Italy	3	0	0	3	39	113	–74	5	15	0	0
C4	12	Japan	3	0	0	3	53	144	–91	8	20	0	0

== Knockout stage ==
=== 9–12th place play-offs ===
Semi-finals
Georgia	18
Italy	17
France	41
Japan	27

9th place
Georgia	24
France	27
11th place
Italy	41
Japan	17

==== Semi-finals ====
Match 19	20 June 2016	Georgia	18–17	Italy	AJ Bell Stadium
	15:15	Try: Mataradze 17' m Gorgadze 55' m Miminoshvili 64' m Pen: Aprasidze (1/2) 70'	Match details	Try: Makelara 30' c Sperandio 80' c Con: Mantelli (2/2) 31', 80'; Pen: Mantelli (1/1) 67'	Referee: (South Africa) Cwengile Jadezweni

Match 20	20 June 2016	France	41–27	Japan	AJ Bell Stadium
	17:30	Try: Ngandebe 11' m Mauvaka 22' c Dupont 26' m Belleau 52' m Roumat 54' m Kaiser 66' c El Ansari 72' c Con: Belleau (1/4) 12', 23'; Dupont (2/3) 66', 72'	Match details	Try: Furukawa 4' c Makisi 34' m Moeakiola (2) 38' m, 63' m Yasuda 50' m Con: Kanai (1/5) 5'	Referee: (Australia) Graham Cooper

==== 11th place game ====
Match 25	25 June 2016	Italy	41–17	Japan	Academy Stadium, Manchester
	12:00	Try: Bronzini (2) 9' m, 40' m Manfredi (2) 20' c, 49' c Licata (2) 57' c, 66' c Con: Mantelli (5/6) 20', 49', 58', 67'; Pen: Mantelli (1/2) 31'	Match details	Try: Yamamura 22' c Tatafu 75' c Con: Kanai (2/2) 22', 75'; Pen: Kanai (1/1) 5'	Referee: (England) Craig Maxwell-Keys

==== 9th place game ====
Match 26	25 June 2016	Georgia	24–27	France	Academy Stadium, Manchester
	14:15	Try: Penalty try 63' c Giorgadze 75' c Goginava 80' c Con: Aprasidze (3/3) 63', 76', 80'; Pen: Aprasidze (1/1) 38'	Match details	Try: Ngandebe 6' c Hannoyer 57' c Dupont 67' c Con: Belleau (1/1) 6'; Dupont (2/2) 58', 68'; Pen: Belleau (1/1) 24'; Dupont (1/1) 49'	Referee: (Argentina) Juan Sylvestre

=== 5–8th place play-offs ===
Semi-finals
New Zealand	71
Wales	12
Scotland	19
Australia	35

5th place
New Zealand	55
Australia	24
7th place
Wales	42
Scotland	19

==== Semi-finals ====
Match 22	20 June 2016	New Zealand	71–12	Wales	Academy Stadium, Manchester
	15:15	Try: Lowe 1' c Dalzell 3' c Makene (3) 5' c, 51' c, 74' m Stevenson (2) 10' c, 67' c Moala-Liava'a 29' c Apisai 42' c Strange 57' m Tomkinson 80' m Con: Barrett (7/7) 2', 4', 7', 11', 30', 42', 52'; Stevenson (0/1); Perofeta (1/3) 68'	Match details	Try: Gage 17' m Keddie 66' c Con: Evans (1/1) 66'	Referee: (Ireland) Andrew Brace

Match 21	20 June 2016	Scotland	19–35	Australia	AJ Bell Stadium
	19:45	Try: Fraser 6' c Nairn 13' m Cummings 43' c Con: Hastings (1/2) 7'; Fraser (1/1) 44'	Match details	Try: Lomax 2' c Tuipulotu (2) 26' c, 55' c Wright 68' c Jackson-Hope 78' c Con: Mason (5/5) 3', 27', 56', 69', 79'	Referee: (Wales) Craig Evans

==== 7th place game ====
Match 28	25 June 2016	Wales	42–19	Scotland	AJ Bell Stadium
	14:30	Try: Rosser 11' c Lewis 19' c Evans 31' c Lewis-Hughes 45' c Thomas 48' c Gage 77' c Con: Evans (5/5) 12', 20', 31', 46', 48'; D. Jones (1/1) 77'	Match details	Try: Nairn 23' c Anderson 63' m Craig 74' c Con: Hastings (2/3) 24', 74'	Referee: (Australia) Graham Cooper

==== 5th place game ====
Match 27	25 June 2016	New Zealand	55–24	Australia	Academy Stadium, Manchester
	16:30	Try: Mikaele-Tu'u 7' c Moala-Liava'a 15' c Strange 20' c Walker-Leawere 48' c Aumua 58' m Umaga-Jensen 69' m Tomkinson 74' c Taumateine 80' c Con: Barrett (6/8) 8', 16', 21', 49', 75', 80'; Pen: Barrett (1/2) 45'		Try: Magnay 10' c Sione 29' c Penalty try 39' c Con: Jooste (2/2) 11', 40'; Tuttle (1/1) 30'; Pen: Jooste (1/1) 44'	Referee: (Wales) Craig Evans

=== Finals ===
Semi-finals
Ireland	37
Argentina	7
England	39
South Africa	17

Final
Ireland	21
England	45
3rd place
Argentina	49
South Africa	19

==== Semi-finals ====
Match 23	20 June 2016	Ireland	37–7	Argentina	Academy Stadium, Manchester
	17:30	Try: Stockdale (2) 7' c, 28' c Deegan 22' c Daly 80' c Con: McPhillips (3/3) 9', 23', 29'; Connon (1/1) 80'; Pen: McPhillips (3/4) 52', 61', 66'	Match details	Try: Mallia 38' c Con: Miotti (1/1) 39'	Referee: (England) Craig Maxwell-Keys

Match 24	20 June 2016	England	39–17	South Africa	Academy Stadium, Manchester
	19:45	Try: Green 2' c Taylor 6' m Aspland-Robinson 20' c Williams 34' c Malins 40' m Wright 72' m Con: Mallinder (3/6) 3', 21', 34'; Pen: Mallinder (1/1) 54'	Match details	Try: Van der Merwe 48' c Bosch 51' c Con: Bosch (2/2) 49', 52'; Pen: Bosch (1/1) 12'	Referee: (New Zealand) Paul Williams

==== 3rd place game ====
Match 29	25 June 2016	Argentina	49–19	South Africa	AJ Bell Stadium
	16:45	Try: Mallia (2) 14' c, 80' c Castiglioni 25' c Romanini 42' c Baldunciel 61' c Dominguez 67' c Con: Miotti (6/6) 15', 26', 43', 63', 68', 81'; Pen: Miotti (3/3) 34', 46', 51'	Match details	Try: Libbok 5' c Van der Merwe 9' m Campher 21' c Con: Bosch (2/3) 6', 22'	Referee: (Ireland) Andrew Brace

==== Final ====
Match 30	25 June 2016	Ireland	21–45	England	AJ Bell Stadium
	19:00	Try: McBurney 46' c Daly 51' c Deegan 78' c Con: McPhillips (2/2) 47', 52'; Connon (1/1) 79'	Match details	Try: Marchant (2) 12' c, 68' c Chick 20' c Taylor 30' c Mallinder (2) 41' c, 49' c Con: Mallinder (5/5) 13', 22', 31', 42', 50'; Green (1/1) 69'; Pen: Mallinder (1/2) 60'	Referee: (New Zealand) Paul Williams
