= 2024–25 Dragons RFC season =

Dragons RFC
- Full name: Dragons RFC
- Union: WRU (Wales)
- Founded: 2003
- Location: Newport
- Ground: Rodney Parade (Capacity: 8,700)
- Chairman: David Wright
- Coach: Filo Tiatia (interim)
- Captain: Ben Carter
- League: United Rugby Championship
- 2023–24: 15th (Welsh Shield: 4th)
1st kit	2nd kit	3rd kit

Official website
- www.dragonsrugby.wales
- Current season

The 2024–25 season is Dragons's fourth season in the United Rugby Championship, and their 23rd season of professional representative rugby. Along with competing in the URC and its Welsh Shield competition, the club will also participate in the 2024-25 European Rugby Challenge Cup.

== Senior squad ==
Dragons United Rugby Championship squad (Note: Taking into account signings and departures head of 2024–25 season as listed on List of 2024–25 United Rugby Championship transfers.)
**Props**: (Moldova) **Dmitri Arhip**; (Wales) Christian Coleman; (Wales) **Rhodri Jones**; (Tonga) **Paula Latu**; (Argentina) **Rodrigo Martínez**; (Wales) Josh Reynolds; (Wales) Luke Yendle; **Hookers**: (Wales) James Benjamin; (Wales) Oli Burrows; (Wales) Brodie Coghlan; (Wales) **Elliot Dee**; **Locks**: (Wales) **Ben Carter** (c); (Australia) Steve Cummins; (Wales) Joe Davies; (Wales) Barny Langton-Cryer; (Wales) **Matthew Screech**	**Back row**: (Wales) **Taine Basham**; (Tonga) **Solomone Funaki**; (Wales) Harrison Keddie; (Wales) **Shane Lewis-Hughes**; (Wales) **Dan Lydiate**; (Wales) George Nott; (Wales) **Aaron Wainwright**; (Wales) George Young; **Scrum-halves**: (Wales) Dane Blacker; (Wales) **Rhodri Williams**; (Wales) Che Hope; **Fly-halves**: (England) Lloyd Evans*; (Wales) Angus O'Brien; (Wales) Will Reed	**Centres**: (Wales) Aneurin Owen; (Australia) Harry Wilson; **Wings**: (Wales) **Rio Dyer**; (Wales) Ashton Hewitt; (Wales) Ewan Rosser; (Wales) Jared Rosser; **Fullbacks**: (Wales) **Cai Evans**; (Wales) Jordan Williams
(cc) denotes the team co-captains, **Bold** denotes internationally capped players.^{*} denotes players qualified to play for Wales on residency or dual nationality.^{ST} denotes a player signed on a short-term deal.^{L} denotes a player on loan at the club. Players and their allocated positions from the Dragons website.

== Transfers ==
=== Players in ===
- (Tonga) Solomone Funaki from (New Zealand) Moana Pasifika
- (Australia) Harry Wilson from (Australia) NSW Waratahs
- (Australia) Steve Cummins from (France) Pau
- (Wales) Shane Lewis-Hughes from (Wales) Cardiff
- (Wales) Oli Burrows from (England) Exeter Chiefs
- (Wales) Owen Conquer from (Wales) Ebbw Vale
- (Wales) Harri Ford from (Wales) RGC 1404
- (Wales) Owain James from (Wales) Cardiff
- (Wales) Oli Woodman promoted from the Academy
- (England) Lloyd Evans from (England) Gloucester

=== Players out ===
- (Wales) Corey Baldwin released
- (Wales) Jack Dixon retired
- (Wales) Lewis Jones released
- (England) Sean Lonsdale to (England) Ealing Trailfinders
- (Wales) Nathan Evans to (Wales) Newport
- (Wales) Bradley Roberts retired
- (England) Lloyd Fairbrother retired
- (New Zealand) Sio Tomkinson to (Australia) Western Force
- (England) Max Clark to (England) Saracens
- (Wales) Steffan Hughes to (United States) Old Glory DC
- (Samoa) Aki Seiuli to (United States) Utah Warriors
- (Argentina) Gonzalo Bertranou to (United States) Rugby FC Los Angeles
- (Wales) Ollie Griffiths retired
- (Wales) Leon Brown retired

== Results ==
=== United Rugby Championship ===
Main table

Pos	Team	Pld	W	D	L	PF	PA	PD	TF	TA	TB	LB	Pts	Qualification
1	Leinster (CH)	18	16	0	2	542	256	+286	79	35	11	1	76	Qualifies for home URC quarter-final; Qualification for the 2025–26 Champions Cup
2	Bulls (RU)	18	14	0	4	542	361	+181	71	44	9	3	68	Qualifies for home URC quarter-final; Qualification for the 2025–26 Champions Cup
3	Sharks	18	13	0	5	436	402	+34	55	59	7	3	62	Qualifies for home URC quarter-final; Qualification for the 2025–26 Champions Cup
4	Glasgow Warriors	18	11	0	7	468	327	+141	70	40	10	5	59	Qualifies for home URC quarter-final; Qualification for the 2025–26 Champions Cup
5	Stormers	18	10	0	8	507	418	+89	66	57	11	4	55	Qualifies for URC quarter-final; Qualification for the 2025–26 Champions Cup
6	Munster	18	9	0	9	444	429	+15	67	59	11	4	51	Qualifies for URC quarter-final; Qualification for the 2025–26 Champions Cup
7	Edinburgh	18	8	1	9	471	407	+64	66	57	9	6	49	Qualifies for URC quarter-final; Qualification for the 2025–26 Champions Cup
8	Scarlets	18	9	1	8	427	382	+45	50	52	6	4	48	Qualifies for URC quarter-final; Qualification for the 2025–26 Champions Cup
9	Cardiff	18	8	1	9	409	477	−68	63	65	10	3	47	Qualification for the 2025–26 Challenge Cup
10	Benetton	18	9	1	8	393	478	−85	50	65	7	1	46	Qualification for the 2025–26 Challenge Cup
11	Lions	18	8	0	10	402	440	−38	53	60	5	3	40	Qualification for the 2025–26 Challenge Cup
12	Ospreys	18	7	1	10	437	454	−17	60	63	6	4	40	Qualification for the 2025–26 Challenge Cup
13	Connacht	18	6	0	12	420	472	−52	64	62	9	6	39	Qualification for the 2025–26 Challenge Cup
14	Ulster	18	7	0	11	414	506	−92	59	72	5	5	38	Qualification for the 2025–26 Challenge Cup
15	Zebre Parma	18	5	1	12	302	503	−201	38	72	3	4	29	Qualification for the 2025–26 Challenge Cup
16	Dragons	18	1	0	17	335	637	−302	43	92	1	4	9	Qualification for the 2025–26 Challenge Cup

Source: UnitedRugby.com
Rules for classification: Tiebreakers for teams tied on points: 1) Number of matches won 2) The difference between points for and points against 3) The number of tries scored 4) The most points scored 5) The difference between tries for and tries against 6) The fewest red cards received 7) The fewest yellow cards received.

2024–25 United Rugby Championship Regional Shield Pools
(Wales) Welsh Shield
	Team	P	W	D	L	PF	PA	PD	TF	TA	TBP	LBP	Pts	Pos overall
1	(Wales) Cardiff (S)	6	4	1	1	147	117	+30	23	14	4	1	23	9
2	(Wales) Scarlets	6	4	0	2	163	126	+37	20	18	3	1	20	7
3	(Wales) Ospreys	6	2	1	3	155	156	–1	21	20	1	1	12	12
4	(Wales) Dragons	6	1	0	5	130	196	–66	15	27	0	1	5	16
If teams are level at any stage, tiebreakers are applied in the following order: 1. number of matches won 2. the difference between points for and points against 3. the number of tries scored 4. the most points scored 5. the difference between tries for and tries against 6. the fewest red cards received 7. the fewest yellow cards received
Green background indicates teams currently leading the regional shield. Upon the conclusion of the regular season, these teams win their respective regional shields. (S) : URC Shield champion

=== Round 1 ===
21 September 2024
15:00

Dragons (Wales)	23–21	(Wales) Ospreys (1 BP)
Try: Keddie 26' c Yendle 83' c Con: L. Evans (2/2) 27', 84'; Pen: L. Evans (3) 1', 23', 77'		Try: K. Williams 19' c Conbeer 45' m Con: Edwards 20' (1/2); Pen: Edwards (3) 7', 33', 37'

Rodney Parade, Newport
Attendance: 5,181
Referee: Ben Breakspear (Wales)

=== Round 2 ===
27 September 2024
19:35

(1 BP) Leinster (Ireland)	34–6	(Wales) Dragons
Try: Conan 17' m R. Byrne 37' m Deegan 46' c McCarthy 64' m Larmour 68' c King 81' m Con: R. Byrne (2/6) 46', 65'		Pen: L. Evans (2/3) 25', 40'

Aviva Stadium, Dublin
Attendance: 18,397
Referee: Mike Adamson (Scotland)

=== Round 3 ===
5 October 2024
17:15

(1 BP) Dragons (Wales)	30–33	(South Africa) Sharks (1 BP)
Try: Basham 17' c Coleman 26' m R. Williams 37' c Carter 54' m Con: L. Evans (2/3) 17', 38'; Pen: L. Evans 3'; Reed 58'		Try: V. Tshituka 21' m Ja. Hendrikse 39' c Julius 44' c Hooker 48' c Mbatha 80'+4; Con: Masuku (4/5) 40', 45', 49', 80'+7

Rodney Parade, Newport
Attendance: 4,591
Referee: Andrew Brace (Ireland)

=== Round 4 ===
13 October 2024
14:30

(1 BP) Dragons (Wales)	19–23	(South Africa) Lions
Try: Keddie 14' c Basham (2) 24' m, 42' c Con: Evans (2/3) 15', 43'		Try: Q. Horn 10' c Cairns 51' c Con: Steyn (1/1) 11'; Nohamba (1/1) 52'; Pen: Steyn (2/2) 28', 40+1'; Nohamba (1/1) 49'

Rodney Parade, Newport
Attendance: 4 237
Referee: Fillipo Russo (Italy)

=== Round 5 ===
19 October 2024
19:35

Dragons (Wales)	21–31	(Italy) Benetton (1 BP)
Try: Westwood 26' c L. Evans 49' c Lewis-Hughes 72' c Con: L. Evans (2/2) 28', 50'. O'Brien 73'		Try: Bernasconi 36' c Avaca 45' c Manfredi 60' c Cannone 67' c Con: Umaga (2/2) 37', 47'; Albornoz (2/2) 61', 68'; Pen: Umaga 32'

Rodney Parade, Newport
Attendance: 4,132
Referee: Peter Martin, Ireland

=== Round 6 ===
26 October 2024
19:35

(1 BP) Connacht (Ireland)	31–7	(Wales) Dragons
Try: Boyle 5' c Blade 19' c Prendergast 38' m Forde 73' c Devine 80' m Con: Forde (3/5) 7', 20', 74'		Try: Basham 77' c Con: O'Brien 78'

The Sportsground, Galway
Attendance: 3,128
Referee: Gianluca Gnecchi, Italy

=== Round 7 ===
30 November 2024
17:15

(1 BP) Cardiff (Wales)	31–23	(Wales) Dragons
Try: Mann 31' c Millard 42' c Sheedy 42' c Lee-Lo 49' c Con: Sheedy (4/4) 32', 43', 43', 50'; Pen: Sheedy 7'		Try: Lloyd 64' c Seiuli 71' c Con: O'Brien (2/2) 65', 72'; Pen: O'Brien (3) 11', 23', 28'

Cardiff Arms Park, Cardiff
Attendance: 9,638
Referee: Ben Whitehouse (Wales)

=== Round 8 ===
26 December 2024
15:00

(1 BP) Dragons (Wales)	22-24	(Wales) Cardiff (1 BP)
Try: Wainwright 14' c Dyer 19' m R. Williams 68' c Con: O'Brien (2/3) 15', 69'; Pen: O'Brien 17'	Report	Try: Williams 32' m Adams 44' c Hamer-Webb 56' c Lloyd 75' m Con: Sheedy (2/4) 45', 57'

Rodney Parade, Newport
Attendance: 8,511
Referee: Adam Jones

=== Round 9 ===
1 January 2025
17:15

Scarlets (Wales)	32–15	(Wales) Dragons
Try: Murray (2) 7', 15'; Macleod 29'; Mee 42'; Con: Costelow (3/4) 8', 16', 31'; Pen: Costelow 11'; Lloyd 69'	Report	Try: Basham 49'; Anderson 66'; Con: O'Brien (1/2) 50'; Pen: O'Brien 14'

Parc y Scarlets, Llanelli
Attendance: 7,605

=== Round 10 ===
25 January 2025
19:35

Dragons (Wales)	19–38	(Ireland) Munster

Rodney Parade, Newport
Attendance: 4,562

=== Round 11 ===
16 February 2025
14:00

Dragons (Wales)	20-45	(Scotland) Glasgow Warriors
Try: Benjamin, 10'c Lewis-Hughes, 41'c Con: Evans, 11', 42'; Pen: Evans, 2', 26'	[ Report]	Try: Matthews, 23'c Mann, 28'; Horne, 30', 47'c Weir, 38'c McBeth, 42'c Cancelliere, 72'c Con: Weir, 24', 38', 43', 48', 73'

Rodney Parade, Newport
Attendance: 4,109

=== Round 12 ===
28 February 2025
20:35

(1BP) Zebre Parma (Italy)	31-21	(Wales) Dragons
Try: Licata, 15'c Stavile, 39'c Prisciantelli, 41'c Paea, 59'c Con: da Re (4); Pen: Prisciantelli, 79'	Report	Try: Coghlan, 12'c, 25'c Westwood, 29'c Con: Reed (3)

Stadio Sergio Lanfranchi, Parma
Attendance: 2,348

=== Round 13 ===
22 March 2025	(1 BP) Dragons (Wales)	30-34	(Ireland) Ulster (1 BP)	Rodney Parade, Newport
17:15	Try: Owen, 1'c, Anderson, 20'c Williams, 34'c Con: Reed (3); Pen: Reed, 14', 47', 63'	Report	Try: Hume, 9'c Herring, 28'c, 44'c Wilson, 70'c Con: Doak (3); Cooney; Pen: Cooney, 65', 80'	Attendance: 5,950

=== Round 14 ===
28 March 2025	(1 BP) Edinburgh (Scotland)	38 - 5	(Wales) Dragons	Hive Stadium, Edinburgh
19:35	Try: Harrison (2); D Graham; Schoeman; Venter; Currie; Con: Thompson (3); Scott	Report	Con: Wainright	Attendance: 6,240

=== Round 15 ===
19 April 2025	Dragons (Wales)	23 - 31	(Wales) Scarlets (1 BP)	Principality Stadium, Cardiff
17:30	Try: Rosser, 26', 46'; Hewitt, 42'; Con: O'Brien, 43'; Pen: O'Brien, 40', 58'	Report	Try: Thomas, 20'; Hepburn, 51'; Fifita, 55'; Murray, 72'; Con: Lloyd, 21', 51', 56', 73; Pen: Lloyd, 81'	Attendance: 28,328; Referee: Aimee Barrett-Theron

=== Round 16 ===
26 April 2025	(1 BP) Ospreys (Wales)	57 – 24	(Wales) Dragons	Swansea.com Stadium
15:00	Try: Spencer, 25'; Lake, 34'; BWarren, 45'; Giles, 50', 78'; Dan Edwards, 56', 59'; Hardy, 71'; Morgan-Williams, 79'; Con: Dan Edwards, 26', 35', 46', 51', 60'; Walsh, 79'	Report, 2	Try: Rees-Weldon, 23'; R Williams, 55'; Rosser, 65'; Con: O'Brien, 24', 55', 66'; Pen: O'Brien, 18'	Attendance: 4,677

=== Round 17 ===
10 May 2025	(1 BP) Stormers (South Africa)	48–12	(Wales) Dragons	Cape Town Stadium
18:15	Try: Simelane, 2', 80'; Senatla, 36'; Ungerer, 50', Willemse, 56'; Hartzenberg, 73' de Wet, 78'; Con: Feinberg-Mngomezulu, 2', 37', 57'; Willemse, 74', 79; Pen: Feinberg-Mngomezulu, 48'; Cards: Moerat, (yellow card) 40' to 50'	Report	Try: Wainwright, 44'; Blacker, 71'; Con: Evans, 71'

=== Round 18 ===
17 May 2025
15:00

Bulls (South Africa)	v	(Wales) Dragons

Loftus Versfeld Stadium, Pretoria

=== European Challenge Cup ===
EPCR Challenge Cup Pool 2
Pos	Team	Pld	W	D	L	PF	PA	PD	TF	TA	TB	LB	Pts	Qualification
1	(France) Montpellier (2)	4	4	0	0	131	41	+90	19	6	3	0	19	Home round of 16
2	(Wales) Ospreys (4)	4	3	0	1	111	116	−5	16	17	3	0	15	Home round of 16
3	(France) Pau (7)	4	2	0	2	119	108	+11	10	10	3	1	12	Home round of 16
4	(South Africa) Lions (14)	4	2	0	2	122	103	+19	18	13	2	0	10	Away round of 16
5	(Wales) Dragons	4	1	0	3	61	116	−55	8	15	0	1	5	
6	(England) Newcastle Falcons	4	0	0	4	55	115	−60	8	16	0	0	0	

Source: EPCR
Rules for classification: Tiebreakers for teams tied on points: 1) Number of matches won; 2) Difference between points for and against; 3) Total number of points for; 4) Aggregate number of points scored in matches between tied teams; 5) Number of matches won excluding the first match, then the second and so on until the tie is settled.

Pool matches

Dragons were eliminated after the pool stages, finishing fifth in their pool.

==== Round 1 ====
6 December 2024
20:00

(1 BP) Dragons (Wales)	14–18	(France) Montpellier
Try: Basham 26' c O'Brien 39' c Con: O'Brien (2/2) 27', 40+1'	Report	Try: Tambwe 12' m Tauleigne 19' c Con: Barreau (1/2) 20'; Pen: Barreau (2/2) 3', 8'

Rodney Parade, Newport
Attendance: 4,012
Referee: Morné Ferreira (South Africa)

==== Round 2 ====
15 December 2024
15:15

Newcastle Falcons (England)	14–22	(Wales) Dragons
Try: Radwan 36' c Hearle 46' c Con: Wilkinson (2/2) 37', 47'	Report	Try: Martínez 15' c Wainwright 49' m Anderson 59' c Con: O'Brien (1/2) 17'; C. Evans (1/1) 60'; Pen: O'Brien (1/1) 34'

Kingston Park, Newcastle
Attendance: 2,801
Referee: Federico Vedovelli (Italy)

==== Round 3 ====
12 January 2025
15:15

Dragons (Wales)	15–24	(France) Pau
Try: Wainwright 37' m Dyer 77' c Con: Lloyd Evans (1/1) 77'; Pen: Lloyd Evans (1/1) 13'	Report	Try: Mondinat 52' c Jooste 63' m Con: Desperes (1/2) 53'; Pen: Desperes (1/1) 11', 23', 28', 47'

Rodney Parade, Newport
Attendance: 4,009
Referee: Aimee Barrett-Theron (South Africa)

==== Round 4 ====
18 January 2025
17:15

(1 BP) Lions (South Africa)	60–10	(Wales) Dragons
Try: Horn (2) 8' c, 48' m Francis 15' c Venter (2) 22' c, 65' c Mafura 26' c Lombard 56' m Visagie 61' m Rass 80' c Con: Francis (4/4) 9', 16', 23', 27'; Lombard (2/5) 66', 80'; Pen: Francis (1/1) 3'	Report	Try: Latu 53' c Con: Reed (1/1) 54'; Pen: Reed (1/2) 7'

Emirates Airline Park, Johannesburg
Attendance: 2,562
Referee: Evan Urruzmendi (France)

== Home attendance ==
End of season

Domestic League						EPRC Challenge Cup						Total	
League	Fixtures	Total Attendance	Average Attendance	Highest	Lowest	League	Fixtures	Total Attendance	Average Attendance	Highest	Lowest	Total Attendance	Average Attendance
2024–25 United Rugby Championship	9	69,601	7,733	28,328	4,109	2024–25 European Rugby Challenge Cup	2	8,021	4,010	4,012	4,009	77,622	7,055
