= The Gospel of Us =

- Directed by: Dave McKean
- Screenplay by: Owen Sheers
- Produced by: Eryl Huw Phillips
- Starring: Michael Sheen
- Production company: Rondo Media Production
- Distributed by: Soda Pictures
- Release date: 4 August 2012
- Country: Wales
- Language: English

The Gospel of Us is a 2012 Welsh drama based on the Owen Sheers novel of the same name and the three-day Passion play that Michael Sheen acted in at his home town of Port Talbot in April 2011. Directed by Dave McKean, the film stars Sheen as The Teacher, a man who has lost all memory of who he is and of the danger his town is facing from a company, ICU. It world premiered at Dawn Breakers International Film Festival.

== Plot ==
A group of people are filming a home movie on the beach when they are interrupted by two men in the background. The Stranger (Nigel Barrett) becomes violent towards The Teacher (Michael Sheen) and chases him away. He then runs towards the camera and grabs it, screaming, 'Forty days!' into it.

A young girl watches a news broadcast where a woman (Di Botcher) is showing photographs of her missing son, The Teacher. On the beach at dawn, people gather at the water's edge. The Stranger walks into the water and waits there. From the sand dunes The Teacher, dressed in bedraggled clothing, appears and walks to the water. He removes his clothes and walks into the sea towards The Stranger, who pushes him under the water. When The Teacher emerges, he cries and is carried to shore where he is wrapped in a cloth and carried away while the people sing, 'He is come.'

Later that day there is a gathering at the beach, where the council await a visit from ICU, a company who has worked closely with the town for years. Entertainers perform for the crowds but are interrupted by The Stranger, who digs a door out of the sand. He stands the door up and from behind it appears a young boy with the likeness of The Teacher. As soon as it begins, the event is over and the celebrations continue until the Company Man (Hywel Simons) arrives by boat, accompanied by his Security Chief (Gerald Tyler) and full security team. The Company Man begins addressing the people of the town but is interrupted when a woman (Francine Morgan) strapped with explosives emerges from the crowd. A masked man who has hijacked the tannoy system (Jordan Bernarde) threatens to detonate the bomb if the company do not leave the town. Before anything happens, The Teacher appears at the waves and walks to the woman, talking to her. He discovers that her name is Joanna and asks her to tell him her story. He removes the bomb and the two embrace, but before any of the security or police can speak with them, they are gone. The bomber is arrested and taken away.

Later that day ICU holds a conference at the town hall to discuss their plans for the town. The Company man speaks to the Mayor (Ken Tucker) about why he can't tell the people of the town that they will all be moved on, and that he must lie to them. The Company Man takes to the mic and explains to the people of the town that in addition to the M4 motorway that runs through the town, the company will be adding a new road, entitled the Passover Project. He explains that families whose houses stand in the way will be rehomed. The people of the town start to revolt, until one woman is shot by the Security Chief. The Teacher appears and cradles her. When questioned by the Company Man about what he wants, he replies, 'I came here to listen!'

The teacher gathers more followers: a fisherman, Peter (David Rees Talbot), Alfie (Darren Lawrence), a man who is haunted by the ghosts of people who used to live in his street, homeless twins with no name whom he calls Legion (John-Paul Macleod, Matthew Aubrey), his brother whom he doesn't recognise, Kyle (Kyle Rees) and a musician, Simon (Matt Woodyatt). At the shopping centre, his mother finds him, but he doesn't recognise her.

Later that night, The Teacher and his friends celebrate at Peter's local club. The Teacher is volunteered to draw the raffle, and his mother approaches him again. She gives him a photograph of him and his daughter, whom he doesn't remember. The encounter visibly moves him, and he calls Joanne into a back room. There he asks her to give him up to ICU's security, and she reluctantly agrees. The friends stumble outside drunkenly, and there The Teacher sees visions of three women: his daughter, his wife and his mother-in-law. He then sees a vision of the Security Chief, covered in blood and adorned with antlers. He asks him to tell him his story, but the vision replies, 'I have no story. I am.'

The visions disappear and The Teacher notices a roofer at work on a nearby house. The roofer is his father, and for a brief moment, he recognises him. His father explain that he has lost a piece of slate from the roof and asks his son to find it. When he does, it's broken, and his father explains that sometimes you have to sacrifice one piece of slate to realise that the roof needs to be fixed. The Teacher reluctantly agrees and is arrested by a local police office, Sgt. Phillips (Kristian Phillips). He is taken to the back of a flat-bed truck where the Security Chief tells him he knows everything about him, about his failed marriage and how he never gets to see his daughter any more. He accuses The Teacher of leading an uprising against ICU and tells him that the people of the town look to him as their king. At that moment, Peter is being quizzed by a local news team about whether he is affiliated with The Teacher, but he denies ever knowing him. The Teacher reluctantly admits his is the king of the town, knowing that he is the piece of slate that is sacrificed to save the whole roof.

The following day The Teacher and the bomber from the beach, Barry Absalum, are tried. Barry is set free and The Teacher is found guilty by the Company Man. Peter tries to stop the events happening by declaring that he does know The Teacher, but it is too late. He is dragged into the town centre and is beaten by the security team. They dress him in a nighty and place a crown of barbed wire upon his head to humiliate him. Sgt Phillips and the rest of the local police refuse to participate. The Teacher is bundled into a van and driven to a local stonemasons, where he is handed a cross. He then follows Simon's drum, and a procession of all the people in the town begin to walk. The Teacher collapses and is carried into the town centre, where his mother bathes his wounds and replaces his crown with one of roses. The procession continues until they reach the beach, where a podium built of all of the doors of the people of the town stands. The Teacher is stripped and nailed to the cross and raised above the town.

As he hangs, a picture of his daughter comes alive in his mind and suddenly he remembers. The film cuts to The Teacher's video diary of his forty missing days, where he flees to the hills surrounding the town due to pressure in his life. He lives happily in the hills, free from his troubles, remarking about the M4 motorway that scars the town. He states that 'Nobody stops in Port Talbot'. On the fortieth day, when journeying into the town for food, he gets lost and begins to forget who he is. It is at this moment that he stumbles down to the beach where he is held under the water by The Stranger. With his memory restored, The Teacher begins to cry out about all of the memories of the town until the skyline is lit with a burst of light and all of the town is brought back to life with old memories.

After he dies, his followers wrap him in cloth and lower him gently, where his mother cradles his body and sings to him. Joanne approaches to remove the cloth to show the town their hero one last time, but when she does, his body is gone and in his place are hundreds of flowers. The Stranger appears on the podium, exclaiming, 'It is finished, it has begun!' and pulls back his hood to reveal himself as The Teacher.

== Cast ==
- Michael Sheen as The Teacher: A man who fled his life forty days before the events of the film, only to lose his memory and act as a symbol of freedom to the whole town.
- Nigel Barrett as The Stranger: A man who guides The Teacher on his journey. He acts as a partial narrator for the film
- Hywel Simons as Company Man: The head of ICU, the company that intends to evict the whole town of Port Talbot from their homes so that a new flyover can be built.
- Di Botcher as The Mother: The mother of The Teacher, who has been searching for her missing son.
- David Rees Talbot as Peter: A fisherman who met The Teacher on the beach, becoming his closest follower.
- John-Paul Macleod and Matthew Aubrey as Legion: Homeless twins who lived in a cemetery, until they were given the names 'Lee' and 'John' by The teacher.
- Darren Lawrence as Alfie: A man who is haunted by the ghosts of the people who once lived in his street, whose houses were demolished to make way for the M4 motorway.
- Kyle Rees as Kyle: The Teacher's brother, who decides to follow him, despite The Teacher's lack of memory.
- Francine Morgan as Joanne: A woman who was tricked into becoming a suicide bomber to attack ICU. She was saved by The Teacher on the beach, becoming his first follower.
- Gerald Tyler as Security Chief: The ruthless head of security for ICU.
- Matt Woodyatt as Simon: A Musician who becomes one of The Teacher's Followers.
- Kristian Phillips as Sgt Phillips: The head of the local police force.
- Jordan Bernarde as Barry: The bomber who attempted to kill the Company Man on the beach.

== Release ==
The premiere was held at Apollo Cinema in Port Talbot, on 9 April 2012. The film was released UK-wide on 13 April 2012.

== Reception ==
=== Accolades ===
| Award | Category | Recipient | Result | Ref. |
|---|---|---|---|---|
| BAFTA Cymru | Best Actor | Michael Sheen | Won | |
| BAFTA Cymru | Best Sound | The Gospel Of Us | Won | |
