= Josh Reynolds =

Josh or Joshua Reynolds may refer to:

- Josh Reynolds (American football) (born 1995), American football wide receiver
- Josh Reynolds (rugby league) (born 1989), Australian rugby league player
- Josh Reynolds (rugby union) (born 1998), Welsh rugby union player
- Joshua Reynolds (1723–1792), English painter
- Joshua Reynolds (politician) (born 1999), British politician
