= Harry Fry =

Harry Fry may refer to:

- Harry Fry (racehorse trainer) (born 1986), British racehorse trainer
- Harry Fry (rower) (1905–1985), Canadian Olympic rower
- Harry Fry (rugby union) (born 2001), Welsh rugby union player
