= Glenstal Abbey School =

Private school in Murroe, County Limerick, Ireland

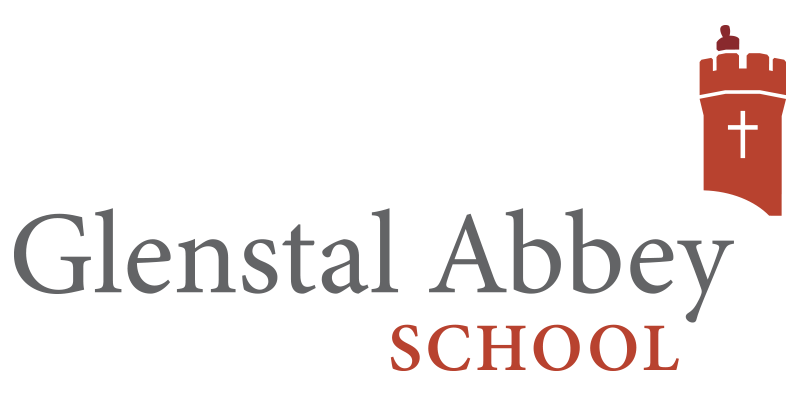
- Murroe, County Limerick; Ireland

Information
- Former name: Glenstal Priory School
- Type: Boys only, 7-day Full Boarding and Day Boarding (Mon–Sat)
- Motto: PAX, Reverence, Respect and Responsibility
- Religious affiliation: Roman Catholic
- Established: 1932
- President: Rt. Rev. Columba McCann OSB
- Head teacher: Mr. Marius Carney
- Chaplain: Fr. Denis Hooper OSB
- Enrollment: c. 250
- Houses: Junior House Inter House Senior House
- Colors: Red and grey
- Mascot: Raven
- Website: www.glenstal.com

Glenstal Abbey School is an all boys private day and boarding Catholic secondary school, located on the grounds of Glenstal Abbey in Murroe, County Limerick, Ireland.

It is run by monks of the Benedictine order. The school offers seven-day full boarding, five day boarding, as well as day boarding on weekdays. The school is regularly ranked among the top schools in Ireland.

In October 2026 it was reported that the school plans to close by August 2028.

== History ==
The school is situated in a castle built for the Barrington family during the 1830s. It was constructed in Norman-Revival style and came to serve as the seat of the Barrington baronets of Limerick, a family who had lived in the area for more than two centuries before relocating to England in the aftermath of the Irish Civil War.

The building's architect, William Bardwell, was tasked with making for the Barrington family a "grand statement that appeared ancient, that would create a noble past in keeping with their newfound baronial status and aspirations". Decorative carvings in the Celtic or Irish Romanesque style were included in the library capitals, stairs and door surrounds of the castle interior, with the castle once offered to W. T. Cosgrave as an official residence for the Irish Free State.

The castle and estate were purchased in September 1925 by Monsignor James J. Ryan, retired president of St Patrick's College, Thurles, for the nominal sum of £2,000. Some months after the purchase, Monsignor Ryan wrote to Dom Celestine Golenvaux OSB, the Abbot of Maredsous Abbey, and invited the Benedictines to come to Ireland to set up a daughter house at Glenstal. The first two Belgian monks arrived at Glenstal in March 1927 to establish the new house.

An arts and crafts school was opened by the founding monks of Glenstal in 1928, before establishing the Abbey School for boys in September 1932. Fr Columba Skerret OSB served as the first Headmaster, and there were just seven boys on the roll. The school's opening led "to a noticeable uplifting in the educational fortunes of the county" as it became "in time firmly established as one of the premier boarding and day schools in Ireland."

Glenstal Abbey was faced with allegations of child abuse. The Irish Government's Scoping Inquiry Report in June 2024 identified a total of six allegations against four alleged abusers, of which three were monks, and one allegation of peer abuse. Cases were reported and investigated; in no case were there criminal or civil proceedings. In a 2014 report the National Board for Safeguarding Children (NBSC) stated that the Benedictine community handled these accusations well with proper action, including removal from monastic life and treatment for one that admitted abuse. At the conclusion of the NBSC's second report in 2018, inspectors recognised the school's awareness of the importance of child safeguarding and its "warmth and care for the children and a desire to support them to grow within a healthy school environment". Likewise, the monks and school leadership were commended "for their sincere approach to safeguarding children". A Department of Education report in January 2024 found that the school's safeguarding, child protection arrangements and anti-bullying procedures met all the required standards.

Over the decades the school has expanded and grown, with Abbot Primate Notker Wolf OSB opening a new academic block costing €6m in 2014 comprising an atrium, 18 new classrooms, three science laboratories, study spaces and administration offices. The school welcomed its largest ever intake of students in the following years, with parents registering interest more than a decade in advance and students joining the school from around the world.

The school had its first lay principal appointed in 2017, working alongside a headmaster appointed from the monastic community. Its second lay principal was appointed in 2021, commenting later that most students were coming from Ireland along with many from Europe, the Americas and Asia who are "drawn to Ireland because of their own personal connections to the country, or by the extremely high quality education on offer here".

== Sports and arts ==
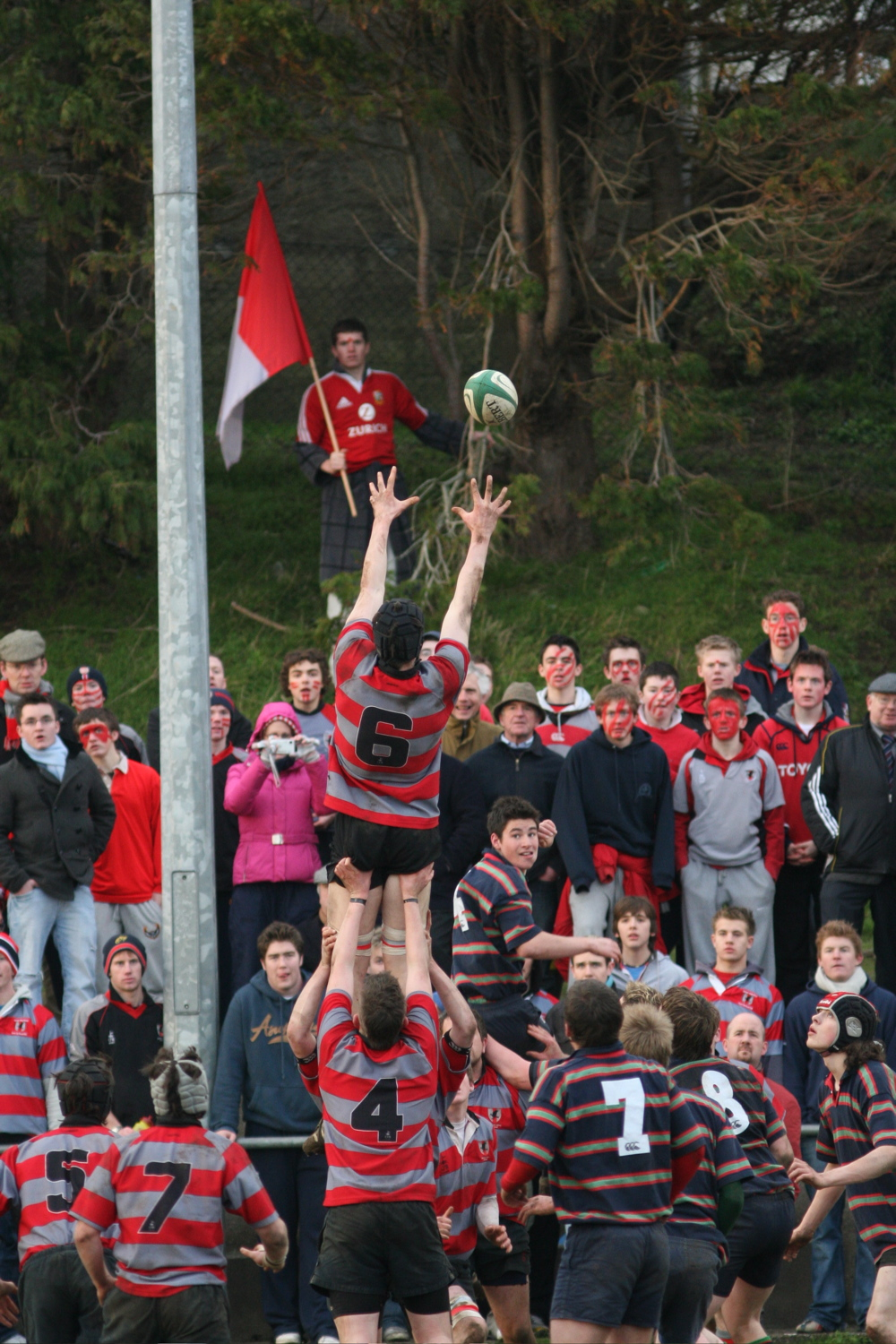
Glenstal vs Newtown in rugby

Training and competition forms a key part of school life with a wide variety of team and individual sports on offer, and students are encouraged to engage in musical, artistic and cultural opportunities in order to foster creativity, wellbeing and critical thinking.

Sports facilities include an indoor sports hall with a weights/cardiovascular suite and outdoor rugby pitches, a soccer pitch and all-weather tennis courts. Rugby is the school's main team sport, though more than a dozen other sporting activities are on offer as part of the school's curriculum.

The school won the Munster Schools Senior Cup for its first time on 18 March 2018 beating Christian Brothers College, Cork 18–17.

A varied extra-curricular programme encompasses art and visual culture, drama productions, music and choral instruction, public speaking and debating groups. Exchange programmes and overseas visits take place throughout the academic year, and members of the monastic community provide spiritual accompaniment to the students.

== Notable former pupils ==
Notable former pupils include:

- John Blayney, Judge of the Supreme Court.
- Kim Carroll, composer and musician.
- Duncan Casey, rugby player.
- Paddy Cosgrave
- Peter Cunningham, writer.
- Henry de Bromhead, horse trainer.
- Francis French, 7th Baron de Freyne, aristocrat and former member of the House of Lords.
- Ben Healy, rugby player.
- Mark Patrick Hederman, former abbot of Glenstal Abbey.
- Colm Hogan, rugby player.
- John M. Kelly, former Minister for Trade, Commerce and Tourism, acting Minister for Foreign Affairs, Attorney General and Government Chief Whip.
- Sean Lucy, Poet and Professor at University College Cork.
- John Magnier, businessman and former senator Seanad Éireann.
- Patrick Martyn-Hemphill, 5th Baron Hemphill, former member of the House of Lords, former chairman of the Galway Race Committee.
- Paul Mullen (rugby union), rugby player.
- Ian Nagle, rugby player.
- Tony O'Connor, Judge of the High Court.
- Sam O'Farrell, Tipperary hurler.
- Eamonn Quigley, researcher in medicine.
- Jack Stafford, rugby player.
