= Peter Cunningham =

Peter Cunningham or Pete Cunningham may refer to:

- Pete Cunningham (kickboxer) (born 1963), Canadian kickboxer and martial arts actor
- Peter Cunningham (British writer) (1816–1869), British writer
- Peter Cunningham (footballer) (1906–1934), Scottish soccer player
- Peter Cunningham (Irish writer) (born 1947), Irish writer
- Peter Cunningham (photographer), American photographer
- Peter Cunningham (priest) (c. 1747 – 1805), English cleric and poet
- Peter Cunningham (racing driver) (born 1962), American race car driver
- Peter Cunningham (rugby union), Australian international rugby union player
- Peter L. Cunningham (1814–1899), mayor of Norwalk, Connecticut
- Peter Miller Cunningham (1789–1864), Scottish naval surgeon and pioneer in Australia
- W. Pete Cunningham (1929–2010), American politician from North Carolina
