= Eamonn Quigley =

- Born: 6 December 1952 (age 73); County Cork, Ireland
- Education: University College Cork
- Scientific career
- Fields: Gastroenterology
- Workplaces: Houston Methodist Hospital; University College Cork; University of Nebraska Medical Center
- Website: Official website

Eamonn Martin Mary Quigley (born 6 December 1952) is David M. Underwood Chair of Medicine in Digestive Disorders, chief of the Division of Gastroenterology and Hepatology at Houston Methodist Hospital, and a Professor of Medicine at Weill Cornell Medical College.

Quigley was educated at Glenstal Abbey School and graduated with an MB BCh from University College Cork in 1976. His MD thesis was awarded by the National University of Ireland in 1984.

He was President of the World Gastroenterology Organisation from 2005 to 2009 and President of the American College of Gastroenterology from 2008 to 2009. He was Editor-in-Chief of The American Journal of Gastroenterology from 1997 to 2003.

He has an h-index of 108.
