= Will Hickey =

Irish rugby union player

- Born: Republic of Ireland
- Height: 1.91 m (6 ft 3 in)
- Weight: 103 kg (16.2 st; 227 lb)

Rugby union career
- Position: Flanker
Senior career
Years	Team	Apps	(Points)
2021–	Ospreys	1	(0)
- Correct as of 16 January 2022

Will Hickey is an Irish rugby union player, currently playing for United Rugby Championship side Ospreys. His preferred position is flanker.

== Ospreys ==
Hickey signed for the Ospreys in March 2021, having previously been a member of the Leinster academy. Hickey was made his debut in Round 3 of the 2021–22 European Rugby Champions Cup in the match against Racing 92.
