= Lennon Greggains =

Welsh rugby union player

- Born: Lennon Greggains; 20 January 1999 (age 27) Newport, Wales
- Height: 187 cm (6 ft 2 in)
- Weight: 96 kg (15 st 2 lb)
- School: Newport High School

Rugby union career
- Position(s): Blindside Flanker; No.8
Senior career
Years	Team	Apps	(Points)
2017–2023	Dragons	11	(0)
2022–2023	Hartpury	3	(0)
International career
Years	Team	Apps	(Points)
2018	Wales U20	5	(0)

Lennon Greggains (born 20 January 1999) is a Welsh former professional rugby union player who played for the Dragons as a flanker.

== Professional career ==
Greggains made his debut for the Dragons in September 2017 against Ulster, having previously played for the Dragons academy, Cross Keys RFC and Newport RFC. Greggains missed the majority of the 2019–20 season due to ruptured knee ligaments. During the season, he signed a contract extension with the Dragons. He signed a further extension in May 2022, along with fellow back row Ben Fry.

He joined Hartpury University R.F.C. on loan for the 2022–23 season. Greggains suffered an injury in October, and returned to playing by February.

At the end of the season, both Greggains and Fry were released by the Dragons.

After departing the Dragons, Greggains joined semi-professional club Merthyr RFC.

Greggains played for Wales U18 in 2017, before representing Wales U20 in the 2018 Six Nations Under 20s Championship and the 2018 World Rugby Under 20 Championship.

== Personal life ==
Since his retirement from rugby, Greggains has spoken out about mental health awareness, and supporting players throughout their careers.
