= Kyle Rees =

Welsh actor

- Born: 9 July 1988 (age 38); Port Talbot, Wales
- Education: The Royal Scottish Academy of Music and Drama

Kyle Rees (born 9 July 1988, Port Talbot, Wales) is a Welsh actor, best known for playing the role of Carl in the BAFTA-award winning movie, Pride.

Rees had a love for theatre from a young age. After attending Sandfields Comprehensive school, he studied at The Royal Scottish Academy of Music and Drama, from which he graduated in 2010.

He first found television fame on Hollyoaks where he landed the recurring role of Blue, a character which allowed him to explore the darker side of human nature. Further television success awaited on the hit soap Emmerdale, but it was his role in the 2014 critically acclaimed film Pride that gave him international fame. His character, Carl, is pivotal to turning the entire mind frame of a small Welsh town, and in doing so opens doors for two very different communities to come together.

In 2015 he played the role of Calo Caine in FX Network's medieval drama series The Bastard Executioner, written by Kurt Sutter. He also had a role in Outlander playing the character John Quincy Myers

== Bibliography ==
- ""Pride" - UK Premiere - Arrivals". Getty Images. 2 September 2014.
- Ornos, Riza (2 March 2015). "'The Bastard Executioner' Star Kyle Reese Reveals How He Scored A Role In Kurt Sutter's Medieval Drama". International Business Times.
- Williams, Kathryn (26 February 2015). "The Bastard Executioner actor goes from the Pride of eighties to medieval times for Kurt Sutter project". WalesOnline.
- Woodrow, Emily (24 January 2010). "Kyle Rees: Bad boy blue". WalesOnline.
