= Gabriel N'Gandebe =

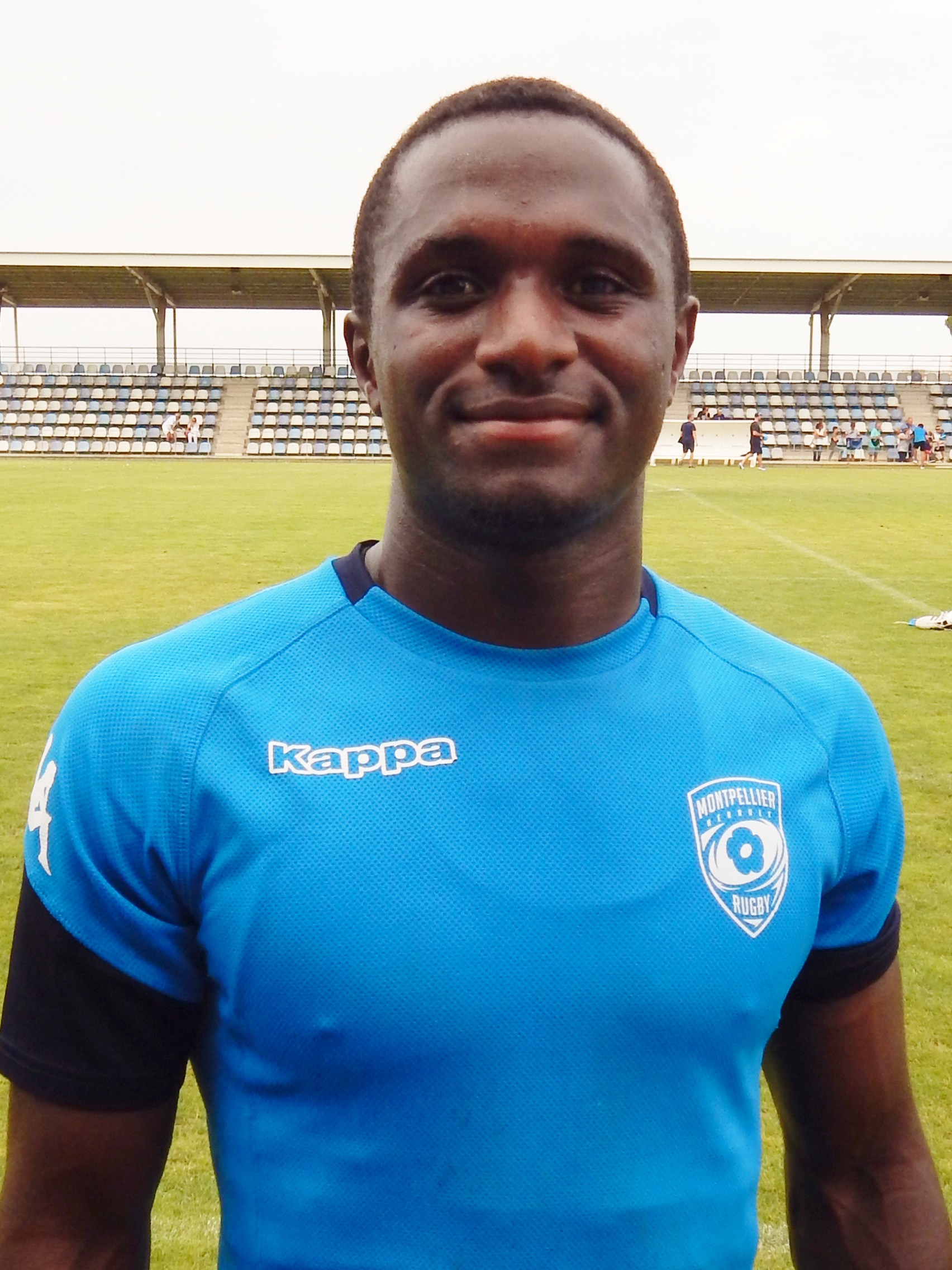
- Born: 30 March 1997 (age 29) Douala, Cameroon
- Height: 1.73 m (5 ft 8 in)
- Weight: 74 kg (11 st 9 lb)

Rugby union career
- Position: Wing
Youth career
- 2010–2013: Bobigny 93
Senior career
Years	Team	Apps	(Points)
2015–2017	Massy	3	(0)
2017–	Montpellier	82	(90)
- Correct as of 8 May 2022
International career
Years	Team	Apps	(Points)
2016–2017	France U20	10	(35)
- Correct as of 4 June 2017

Gabriel N'Gandebe (born 30 March 1997) is a Cameroonian/French rugby union player who plays for Montpellier HR in the Top 14. His usual playing position is wing. He has also represented the France U20 team.
