= Huw Taylor =

English rugby union player

- Born: Huw Charles Taylor; 5 June 1996 (age 30) Bridgnorth, Shropshire, England
- Height: 1.96 m (6 ft 5 in)
- Weight: 112 kg (17 st 9 lb)
- School: Old Swinford Hospital

Rugby union career
- Position(s): Lock; Blindside Flanker
Senior career
Years	Team	Apps	(Points)
2014–2018	Worcester Warriors	27	(10)
2018–2023	Dragons	52	(59)
2023–2024	RGC 1404		
2024-2026	Seattle Seawolves	14	(10)
2026-	Plymouth Albion		
- Correct as of 15 June 2023
International career
Years	Team	Apps	(Points)
2014	England U18		
2016	England U20	10	(10)
- Correct as of 25 June 2017

Huw Charles Taylor (born 5 June 1996) is an English rugby union player who plays as a lock or a flanker for Seattle Seawolves. Taylor has previously played for Worcester Warriors and Dragons RFC, and has represented England U20.

== Professional career ==
In October 2014, Taylor made his club debut for Worcester against Nottingham in the British and Irish Cup. Taylor went on to be part of the side that defeated Doncaster in the final to win the cup that season.

Taylor has represented England U18s and in the 2016 Six Nations Under 20s Championship. In June 2016, Taylor was a member of the England U20 team that won the Junior World Cup, scoring a try in the final against Ireland.

On 2 May 2017, Taylor signed his first senior contract with Worcester at Sixways Stadium ahead of the 2017-18 season. In January 2018 it was announced that Taylor would be joining Pro14 side Dragons. He is a Welsh-qualified player through a grandparent. Taylor signed an extension with the Dragons on 24 May 2022. Taylor was released at the end of the 2022–23 season, and subsequently joined RGC 1404 as a player-coach.

In 2026 Huw made the move to Plymouth Albion R.F.C. and at the start of the 2026–27 National League 1 season was made captain of the club.
