= Nicola Piantella =

Italian rugby union player (born 2001)

- Born: 28 March 2001 (age 25) Bassano del Grappa, Italy
- Height: 1.98 m (6 ft 6 in)
- Weight: 100 kg (15 st 10 lb; 220 lb)

Rugby union career
- Position: Lock
- Current team: Fiamme Oro
Youth career
- Rangers Vicenza Rugby
Senior career
Years	Team	Apps	(Points)
2020−2021	F.I.R. Academy	-	(-)
2021	→Benetton	2	(0)
2021−2022	Rovigo Delta	9	(5)
2022	→Benetton	3	(5)
2022−2023	Benetton	1	(0)
2023	→Mogliano	7	(5)
2023−2024	Zebre Parma	0	(0)
2024−	Fiamme Oro		
- Correct as of 25 Mar 2023
International career
Years	Team	Apps	(Points)
2021	Italy Under 20	5	(0)
2022	Emerging Italy	1	(0)
2022	Italy A	1	(0)
- Correct as of 24 Jun 2022

Nicola Piantella (born 28 March 2001) is an Italian rugby union player. His usual position is as a Lock and he currently plays for Serie A Elite team Fiamme Oro.

Selected for F.I.R. Academy, in the 2020–21 Pro14 season, and under contract with Rovigo Delta, in 2021–22 United Rugby Championship season, he was named as Permit Player for Benetton Rugby. He made his debut in Round 16 of the competition against Munster. In 2022–23, he played for Benetton Rugby and, on loan, with Top10 team Mogliano, until the end of the season. In May 2023 he signed for Zebre Parma in United Rugby Championship, but he didn't play for injury and in March 2024 he came back in Serie A Elite with Fiamme Oro.

In June 2021 Piantella was named in Italy Under 20 squad for 2021 Six Nations Under 20s Championship.

On 26 May 2022, for the match against Netherlands, he was named in the 30-man Emerging Italy squad, for the 2022 July rugby union tests. On 26 May Piantella was called in Italy A squad for the South African tour in the 2022 mid-year rugby union tests against Namibia and Currie Cup XV team. On 13 January 2024 he was called in Italy Under 23 squad for test series against IRFU Combined Academies.
