= Ataata Moeakiola =

Japanese rugby union player

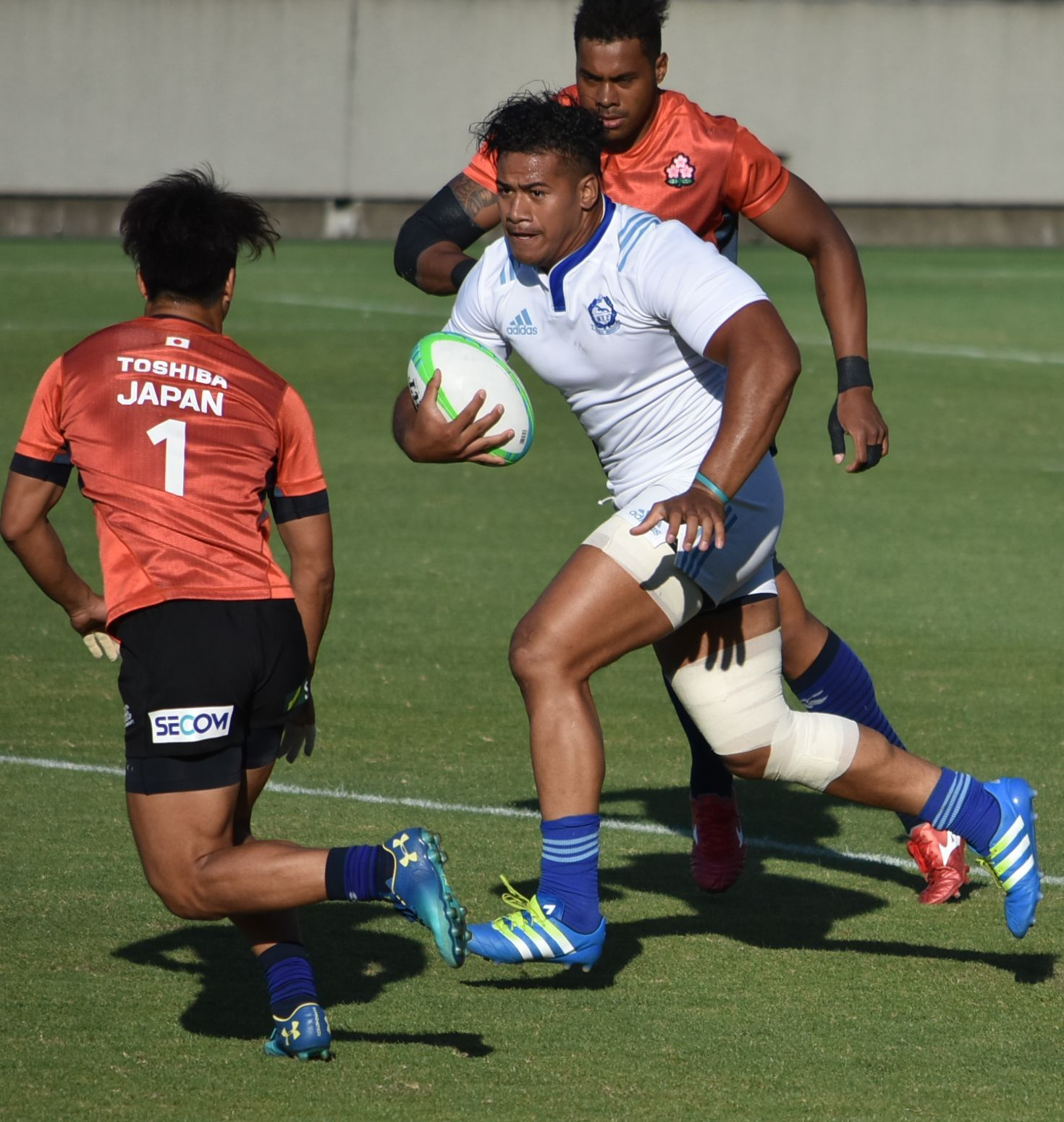
- Born: 6 February 1996 (age 30) Tonga
- Height: 186 cm (6 ft 1 in)
- Weight: 99 kg (218 lb; 15 st 8 lb)

Rugby union career
- Position(s): Wing, Fullback, Fly-half, Number 8, Flanker
- Current team: Kobelco Steelers
Senior career
Years	Team	Apps	(Points)
2020–	Kobelco Steelers	60	(180)
2024	Manawatu	4	(10)
- Correct as of 26 February 2023
Super Rugby
Years	Team	Apps	(Points)
2017	Sunwolves	0	(0)
2019	Chiefs	9	(15)
- Correct as of 21 February 2021
International career
Years	Team	Apps	(Points)
2015–2016	Japan U20	10	(39)
2015–	Japan	4	(15)
- Correct as of 21 February 2021

Ataata Moeakiola (born 6 February 1996 in Tonga) is a Tongan-born, Japanese rugby union player who plays on the wing. He most recently played for the Chiefs in 2019.

== Youth career ==
Moeakiola, originally from Tonga, having left Tonga aged just 15 thanks to a university rugby scholarship in Japan. He played for the Japan's U20 side at the World Rugby Under 20 Championship in 2016.

He gained much attention for grabbing a spectacular hat-trick inside 30 minutes against South Africa at the under-20 Rugby Championship in England.

== Professional career ==
Moeakiola signed for the Chiefs for the 2019 Super Rugby season and will look to make his debut in the competition.

== International career ==
He was named in the Japan squad for the 2019 Rugby World Cup.
