= Colm Hogan =

Irish rugby union player

- Born: 14 January 1997 (age 29) Ireland
- Height: 1.87 m (6 ft 1 1/2 in)
- Weight: 95 kg (15.0 st; 209 lb)

Rugby union career
- Position(s): Fullback, Wing
Senior career
Years	Team	Apps	(Points)
2023	Tasman	2	(0)
2023	Munster	2	(0)
- Correct as of 23 February 2024

Colm Hogan (born 14 January 1997) is an Irish rugby union player, who currently plays as Fullback. Hogan attended Glenstal Abbey School before going on to study law at Trinity College Dublin where he captained Dublin University Football Club, the oldest rugby club in the world, whilst also playing for Old Belvedere Rugby Club.

== Career ==
After playing for Ireland and Munster and under 20 level, Hogan moved to New Zealand where he was named in the Tasman development squad for the 2023 Bunnings NPC, making his debut in Round 9 of the competition against Bay of Plenty, coming off the bench in the number 22 jersey.

Hogan signed for his former academy club Munster Rugby in November 2023 on a short-term contract.
