= Huw Anderson =

Welsh rugby union player (born 2004)

- Born: 24 September 2004 (age 22) Lima, Peru
- Height: 1.78 m (5 ft 10 in)
- Weight: 85 kg (187 lb)
- School: St Martins Comprehensive School

Rugby union career
- Position(s): Wing; Full-back
- Current team: Dragons RFC
Senior career
| Years | Team | Apps | (Points) |
| 2024- | Dragons | 31 | (20) |
International career
| Years | Team | Apps | (Points) |
| 2024 | Wales U20 | 6 | (15) |

Huw Anderson (born 24 September 2004) is a Welsh professional rugby union player who plays at full back for Dragons RFC.

== Club career ==
He is from Caerphilly and has played at full-back and on the wing. He made his professional debut for Dragons RFC in March 2024 in the United Rugby Championship off the bench against Ulster Rugby in Belfast. Anderson also played for Pontypool in the Super Rygbi Cymru competition during the 2024-25 season. He impressed on his first start in the EPCR Challenge Cup against Newcastle Falcons on 15 December 2024, being awarded the man-of-the-match.

Anderson signed a long-term contract extension with the Dragons on 18 March 2025.

== International career ==
He represented Wales at under-20 level and made a try scoring debut against Scotland U20 in the U20 Six Nations in February 2024. He played at the World Rugby U20 Championship in South Africa, scoring a try against New Zealand U20. In October 2024, he was called-up to train with the senior Welsh squad.
