= Rowan Jenkins =

Welsh rugby player

- Born: Rowan Jenkins; 10 June 1991 (age 35) Carmarthen, Wales
- School: Coleg Sir Gar

Rugby union career
- Position: Prop
- Current team: Ospreys
Senior career
Years	Team	Apps	(Points)
2016-	Ospreys	1	(0)
- Correct as of 10:44, 3 December 2017 (UTC)
International career
Years	Team	Apps	(Points)
- Wales U18

Rowan Jenkins (born 10 June 1991) is a Welsh rugby union player who plays for the Ospreys as a prop. He was a Wales under-18 international.

Jenkins made his debut for the Ospreys in 2016 having previously played for Aberavon RFC, Felinfoel RFC and Llanelli RFC.
