= Leonardo Mantelli =

Italian rugby union player

- Born: 7 December 1996 (age 29) Prato, Italy
- Height: 1.81 m (5 ft 11 in)
- Weight: 82 kg (12 st 13 lb; 181 lb)

Rugby union career
- Position: Fly-Half
- Current team: Colorno
Youth career
- GIPSI Prato
- –: UR Prato Sesto
- –: I Cavalieri Prato
Senior career
Years	Team	Apps	(Points)
2014−2015	F.I.R. Academy		
2015−2019	Rovigo Delta	68	(400)
2019−2020	Colorno	12	(79)
2019	→Zebre	2	(0)
2020−	I Cavalieri Prato		
- Correct as of 23 May 2020
International career
Years	Team	Apps	(Points)
2016	Italy Under 20	10	(46)
2017	Emerging Italy	2	(7)
- Correct as of 23 May 2020

Leonardo Mantelli (born Prato, 7 December 1996) is an Italian rugby union player. His usual position is as a Fly-Half and he currently plays for Colorno in Top12.

For 2019–20 Pro14 season, he named like Additional Player for Zebre in Pro 14.

In 2016 Mantelli was named in the Italy Under 20 squad and in 2017, he also was named in the Emerging Italy squad.
