= Jack Stafford (rugby union) =

Irish rugby union player

- Born: 11 July 1997 (age 29) Wexford, Ireland
- Height: 1.80 m (5 ft 11 in)
- Weight: 85 kg (13.4 st; 187 lb)
- School: Glenstal Abbey School

Rugby union career
- Position: Scrum-half
Amateur team(s)
Years	Team	Apps	(Points)
- Shannon
Senior career
Years	Team	Apps	(Points)
2017–2020	Munster	3	(0)
2020–2023	Harlequins	7	(0)
2021-2022	Richmond RFC (loan)	7	(5)
- Correct as of 29 Mar 2022
International career
Years	Team	Apps	(Points)
2017	Ireland U20	6	(5)
- Correct as of 18 June 2017

Jack Stafford (born 11 July 1997) is a former Irish rugby union player. He played as a scrum-half for English Premiership Rugby side Harlequins and for Munster Rugby. He retired in July 2023 and now works in Sydney at Market Lane Insurance Group

== Early life ==
Stafford was born in Wexford, Ireland and attended Glenstal Abbey School, where he was selected in the Munster Schools Team of the Year in 2014 and 2016. He represented Munster at Under-18 and Under-19 level.

== Domestic career ==
=== Munster ===
Stafford made his senior competitive debut for Munster on 26 November 2017, coming off the bench to replace James Hart in the provinces 2017–18 Pro14 round 9 win against Zebre. He was released by province in June 2020 after completing the three-year academy cycle.

=== Harlequins ===
Stafford moved to England to join Premiership Rugby side Harlequins, in a move that was confirmed in August 2020. He had a two-week trail with the club during the summer, and signed a short-term contract until October 2020, which was later extended. Stafford made his debut for the club as a replacement in their 57–21 defeat at home to Ulster in the last 16 of the 2020–21 Challenge Cup on 4 April 2021.

== Ireland ==
Stafford has played for Ireland Under-20s at the 2017 Six Nations Under 20 Championship and the 2017 World Rugby Under 20 Championship.
