= Peter Cunningham (Irish writer) =

Irish novelist

Peter Cunningham (born 1947) is an Irish novelist who is known for his historical novels about Ireland. His works have received several literary awards in Ireland and Europe. Cunningham's fiction is said to be distinguished by its fusion of political material with psychological realism and a lyrical sensitivity to place and people.

== Career ==
Cunningham's first novel, Noble Lord, was a thriller, written under the pseudonym Peter Lauder. Tapes of the River Delta, Consequences of the Heart, and Love in One Edition, which chronicle the lives of local families during the twentieth century in Monument, Cunningham's fictional version of Waterford, Ireland.

Cunningham's novel The Taoiseach, based on the life of Charles J. Haughey, was a controversial bestseller. Capital Sins, a satirical novel, dealt with the collapse of the Irish economy during the Great Recession.

In 2020 he published Freedom is a Land I cannot see, which was set in 1920s Ireland.

== Critical reception ==
In 2011, Cunningham won the Cecil Day-Lewis Bursary Award.

The Sea and the Silence (translated into French as La Mer et le silence) was awarded the Prix de l’Europe in 2013. This novel also won the Prix Caillou in France and was short-listed for the Prix des Lecteurs du Telégramme.

Consequences of the Heart was short-listed for the Kerry Listowel Writers' Prize. Acts of Allegiance was long-listed for the 2019 Dublin International Literary Award.

== Personal life ==
Cunningham grew up in Waterford, where his family had lived since the mid-19th century.

Cunningham is a member of Aosdána. He has judged the Glen Dimplex Literary Awards and the Bantry Festival Writer's Prize. In 2017 he was one of the nominees for the new post of Irish Fiction Laureate, created by the Arts Council of Ireland.

Cunningham is married to Carol, a Jungian analyst, with whom he has six children. They live in County Kildare, Ireland.
