= Marcus Hanan =

Irish rugby union player

- Born: 10 March 2000 (age 26) Republic of Ireland
- Height: 1.83 m (6 ft 0 in)
- Weight: 106 kg (234 lb; 16 st 10 lb)
- School: Salesian College, Celbridge, County Kildare

Rugby union career
- Position: Prop
Senior career
Years	Team	Apps	(Points)
2021–2023	Leinster	4	(0)
- Correct as of 20 April 2023
International career
Years	Team	Apps	(Points)
2020	Ireland U20s	2	(10)
- Correct as of 20 February 2021

Marcus Hanan (born 10 March 2000) is an Irish rugby union player, who has previously played for Pro14 and European Rugby Champions Cup side Leinster. His preferred position is prop. He also represents amateur side Terenure College RFC in the Energia All Ireland League. At the end of the 2023, Hanan was released from contract by Leinster.

== Leinster ==
Hanan was named in the Leinster side for Round 12 of the 2020–21 Pro14 against Dragons. He made his debut in the same match, coming on as a replacement. Hanan had come through the Leinster Academy system, joining the academy full time in August 2021. He played his junior rugby for Clane, who he had played for since the age of seven.
