= Joe Thomas (rugby union) =

- Born: Joe Thomas; 21 February 1996 (age 30) Wales
- School: Neath Port Talbot College

Rugby union career
- Position: Outside Centre
- Current team: Houston SaberCats
Senior career
Years	Team	Apps	(Points)
2015–2018	Ospreys	16	(0)
2017	→ Dragons (loan)	0	(0)
2019–2020	Leicester Tigers	6	(0)
2021-present	Houston SaberCats	10	(0)
- Correct as of 22 August 2021
International career
Years	Team	Apps	(Points)
- Wales U20

Joe Thomas (born 21 February 1996) is a Welsh rugby union player who recently played for Leicester Tigers in England's Premiership Rugby. His principal position is centre. He has previously played for the Ospreys and Dragons in the Pro14 and was a Wales under-20 international.

== Career ==
Thomas is a product of Morriston RFC and made his debut for the Ospreys regional team in 2015 having previously played for the Ospreys academy, Aberavon RFC and Swansea RFC, while also enjoying a loan spell at the Dragons, Joe also played in every game for Wales U20's when they won the grand slam.

On 21 June 2019 Thomas was announced as a new signing for Leicester Tigers.

== Family ==
Joe's father and uncle both played in a victorious Siam cup side playing for Guernsey in 2005.
