= Ben Fry (rugby union) =

Welsh rugby union player

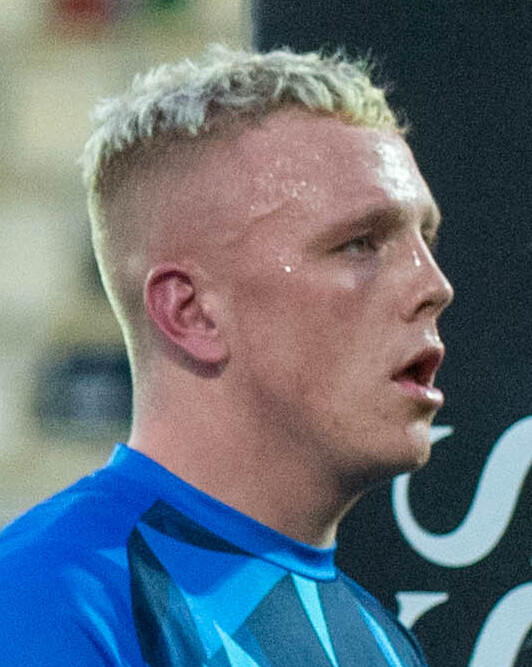
- Born: Benjamin Fry; 26 September 1998 (age 28) Radyr, Wales
- Height: 186 cm (6 ft 1 in)
- Weight: 105 kg (16 st 7 lb)
- School: Radyr Comprehensive School
- Notable relative: Harry Fry (brother)

Rugby union career
- Position: Openside Flanker
Senior career
Years	Team	Apps	(Points)
2018–2023	Dragons RFC	37	(10)
2023	Merthyr RFC		
2024	Dallas Jackals	6	(12)
2025	Cardiff RFC		
International career
Years	Team	Apps	(Points)
- Wales U18
2018	Wales U20	2	(0)

Benjamin Fry (born 26 September 1998) is a Welsh professional rugby union player. Fry played as a flanker for Dragons RFC and Merthyr RFC in Wales, as well as the Dallas Jackals in Major League Rugby in the United States. He retired in 2024, but made a return to rugby in 2025, signing with Cardiff RFC.

== Professional career ==
Having come through Bargoed RFC, Fry made his debut for the Dragons in January 2018 versus Timișoara Saracens in the European Rugby Challenge Cup. Fry scored a debut try in the 59–3 win.

Fry signed his first senior contract with the Dragons in July 2020. He made his debut in the United Rugby Championship against Ospreys in August 2020. Fry signed a contract extension with the club on 11 May 2022, along with fellow flanker Lennon Greggains. Fry was released by the Dragons at the end of the season.

After being released, Fry turned down a contract offer from Jersey Reds, and instead joined Merthyr RFC.

Fry joined Major League Rugby team Dallas Jackals ahead of the 2024 Major League Rugby season. He retired after the Jackals withdrew from the tournament ahead of the 2025 season. Fry returned to rugby ahead of the 2025–26 Super Rygbi Cymru season, joining Cardiff RFC.

In May 2018, Fry was selected for Wales U20 for the 2018 World Rugby Under 20 Championship in France, having previously played for Wales Under 16 and Wales Under 18. Fry made two appearances during the tournament.

== Personal life ==
He is from Radyr, Cardiff, in Wales. His younger brother Harry joined him at the Dragons in 2020, before departing for Hartpury University R.F.C. After retiring from rugby union he moved back to Cardiff from Fort Worth, and as of 2025 was working as an estate agent in Bristol, England. He has two children.
