= Matthew Aubrey =

Welsh rugby union player

- Full name: Matthew Aubrey
- Born: 4 June 1997 (age 29) Swansea, Wales
- Height: 168 cm (5 ft 6 in)
- Weight: 66 kg (10 st 6 lb; 146 lb)
- School: Gower College Swansea

Rugby union career
- Position: Scrum-half
- Current team: Swansea (rugby team)
Senior career
Years	Team	Apps	(Points)
2013-2023	Ospreys	34	(5)
International career
Years	Team	Apps	(Points)
–	Wales U18		
- Correct as of 14 March 2021

Matthew Aubrey (born 4 June 1997) is a Welsh rugby union player who plays for the Cardiff as a scrum-half. He was a Wales under-18 international.

Aubrey made his debut for the Ospreys in 2013 having previously played for the club's academy and Swansea RFC.

In March of 2022, Aubrey and team mate Callum Carson were suspended by the Ospreys indefinitely for an incident involving a sleeping homeless man. They were also ordered to volunteer at Wallich Swansea, a local homeless charity to attempt to atone for their actions.
