= Harry Fry (rugby union) =

Wales rugby union player

- Born: 5 April 2001 (age 25) Wales

Rugby union career
- Position: Prop
- Current team: Dragons
Senior career
Years	Team	Apps	(Points)
2020	Hartpury University	1	(0)
2020–	Dragons	0	(0)
- Correct as of 15 July 2020

Harry Fry (born 5 April 2001) is a Welsh rugby union player for Dragons in the Pro14. Fry's primary position is prop.

== Rugby Union career ==
=== Professional career ===
Fry came through the Gloucester academy, and while studying at Hartpury College represented Hartpury University making 1 appearance, including a debut in the RFU Championship. He joined Dragons academy ahead of the 2020–21 Pro14 season, joining his brother Ben.
