= Luke Yendle =

Welsh rugby union player

- Born: 27 June 2000 (age 26) Caerphilly, Wales
- Height: 1.86 m (6 ft 1 in)
- Weight: 119 kg (18.7 st; 262 lb)

Rugby union career
- Position: Prop
Senior career
Years	Team	Apps	(Points)
2020 –	Dragons	22	(10)
2021-22	Jersey Reds	12	
2026	Harlequins	02	(05)
- Correct as of 12:12, 16 February 2026 (UTC)

Luke Yendle (born 27 June 2000) is a Welsh rugby union player, currently playing for Pro14 side Dragons. His preferred position is prop.

== Professional career ==
Yendle was named in the Dragons transition squad for the 2020–21 Pro14 season. He made his Dragons debut in Round 1 of the 2020–21 European Rugby Champions Cup against Wasps.

For the 2021–22 season, Yendle joined Jersey Reds on loan where he played 12 games

Yendle originally signed for Ampthill on loan for the 2023–24 season but was called back before the season started.

He joined Harlequins in February 2026 on loan to play in the Premiership Cup - where he came on as a sub against Saracens and scored on his first start against Northampton before being recalled by the Dragons
