= Josh Reynolds (rugby union) =

Welsh rugby union player (born 1998)

Joshua Reynolds
- Born: Joshua Gabriel Reynolds; 1 December 1998 (age 27) Newport, Wales
- Height: 181 cm (5 ft 11 in)
- Weight: 113 kg (17 st 11 lb)
- School: Caerleon Comprehensive School, Newport High School

Rugby union career
- Position: Loosehead Prop
- Current team: Dragons
Youth career
- NHSOB RFC
- –: Caerleon RFC
Senior career
Years	Team	Apps	(Points)
2017-	Dragons	45	(5)
- Correct as of 12:01, 6 February 2024 (UTC)
International career
Years	Team	Apps	(Points)
–	Wales U20		

Joshua Reynolds (born 1 December 1998) is a Welsh rugby union player who plays for the Dragons as a prop.

Reynolds made his debut for the Dragons in 2017 against the Scarlets in the Anglo Welsh Cup. Reynolds has also made appearances for Crosskeys RFC, Bedwas RFC, Pontypool RFC and Newport RFC. He has represented Wales at the U16, U18 and U20 level. In his youth he played for his local clubs Caerleon RFC and NHSOB RFC.
