= 2018 World Rugby Under 20 Championship =

Tournament details
- Host: France
- Date: 30 May – 17 June 2018
- Teams: 12

Final positions
- Champions: France
- Runner-up: England
- Third place: South Africa
- Fourth place: New Zealand

Tournament statistics
- Matches played: 30
- Top scorer(s): (France) Louis Carbonel (60)
- Most tries: (Italy) Giovanni D'Onofrio (South Africa) Wandisile Simelane (6 tries each)

The 2018 World Rugby Under 20 Championship was the eleventh annual international rugby union competition for Under 20 national teams. The event was organised in France by rugby's governing body, World Rugby. Twelve nations played in the tournament, which was held in three cities from 30 May to 17 June.

== Teams ==
The following teams participated in the 2018 U20 Championship:

Team	No.	Result (2017)	Best Result
Argentina	11	11th	Third place (2016)
Australia	11	6th	Runners-up (2010)
England	11	2nd	Champions (2013, 2014, 2016)
France	11	4th	Fourth place (2011, 2015, 2017)
Georgia	3	10th	Tenth place (2016, 2017)
Ireland	11	9th	Runners-up (2016)
Italy	9	8th	Eighth place (2017)
Japan (Note: Promoted from 2017 U20 Trophy)	5	—	Tenth place (2015)
New Zealand	11	1st	Champions (2008, 2009, 2010, 2011, 2015, 2017)
Scotland	11	5th	Fifth place (2017)
South Africa	11	3rd	Champions (2012)
Wales	11	7th	Runners-up (2013)

== Venues ==
The venues that play host to the tournament were as follows:

Béziers	Narbonne	Perpignan
Stade de la Méditerranée	Parc des Sports Et de l'Amitié	Stade Aimé Giral
Capacity: 18,555	Capacity: 12,000	Capacity: 14,593
Stadium locations within the southern french region of Occitanie.

== Pool stage ==
The Pool stage fixture was as follows:

=== Pool A ===
Team	Pld	W	D	L	PF	PA	−/+	TF	TA	BP	Pts
New Zealand	3	3	0	0	136	28	+108	19	3	2	14
Wales	3	2	0	1	54	80	–26	5	10	0	8
Australia	3	1	0	2	93	72	+21	12	8	2	6
Japan	3	0	0	3	36	139	–103	6	21	1	1

Match 4	30 May 2018	Australia	21–26	Wales	Stade de la Méditerranée, Béziers
	21:00	Try: Hansen 24' m McDermott 76' c Con: Lucas (1/1) 77'; Pen: Lonergan (3/3) 4', 34', 48'		Try: Nicholas 30' c Goodchild 37' c Con: Evans (2/2) 31', 38'; Pen: Evans (4/5) 9', 20', 42', 58'

Match 6	30 May 2018	New Zealand	67–0	Japan	Parc des Sports Et de l'Amitié, Narbonne
	21:00	Try: Tucker 1' m Faingaʻanuku (2) 3' m, 18' c Koroi 9' c Sullivan 20' c Christie 37' c Roe 41' m Akauola-Laula 52' c Spowart (3) 58' c, 60' m, 79' m Con: Trask (6/11) 10', 19', 21', 38', 53, 59'

Match 11	3 June 2018	Australia	54–19	Japan	Parc des Sports Et de l'Amitié, Narbonne
	14:00	Try: Tupou 3' c Hansen 6' c Wood 29' c Maafu 37' c McTaggart 61' c McDermott 64' c Lonergan (2) 67' c, 70' m Con: Lucas (4/4) 4', 7', 30', 38'; Harrison (3/4) 62', 65', 68'		Try: Yamamoto (2) 15' m, 20' c Vakalahi 79' c Con: Mamada (1/2) 21'; Mori (1/1) 80'

Match 10	3 June 2018	New Zealand	42–10	Wales	Stade de la Méditerranée, Béziers
	16:30	Try: Proctor 3' c Sullivan 24' m Christie 29' c Mafile'o 64' c Roe 74' c Con: Plummer (4/5) 4', 30', 65', 75'; Pen: Plummer (3/3) 18', 40', 62'		Try: Basham 9' c Con: Evans (1/1) 10'; Pen: Evans (1/1) 14'

Match 13	7 June 2018	Wales	18–17	Japan	Stade Aimé Giral, Perpignan
	18:30	Try: Morgan 16' c Cross 52' m Con: Evans (1/2) 17'; Pen: Evans (2/3) 31', 36'		Try: Vailea 11' m Arai 23' m Fifita 75' c Con: Mori (1/1) 76'

Match 14	7 June 2018	New Zealand	27–18	Australia	Stade Aimé Giral, Perpignan
	21:00	Try: Plummer 4' c Flanders 11' c Spowart 62' c Con: Plummer (3/3) 5', 12', 63'; Pen: Plummer (2/2) 17', 54'		Try: McReight 28' m Penalty try 23'; Pen: Lucas (2/2) 9', 58'

=== Pool B ===
Team	Pld	W	D	L	PF	PA	−/+	TF	TA	BP	Pts
England	3	3	0	0	117	33	+84	18	4	3	15
Italy	3	2	0	1	62	95	–33	9	14	2	10
Argentina	3	1	0	2	73	82	–9	10	10	3	7
Scotland	3	0	0	3	49	91	–42	5	14	1	1

Match 3	30 May 2018	Scotland	26–27	Italy	Stade de la Méditerranée, Béziers
	18:30	Try: Dunbar 32' m Chapman 37' m Dewhirst 51' c Con: Chapman (1/3) 52'; Pen: Chapman (3/4) 9', 49', 61'		Try: Penalty try 27'; D'Onofrio 58' c Forcucci 63' m Taddia 80+2' m Con: Di Marco (1/3) 59'; Pen: Rizzi (1/2) 44'

Match 5	30 May 2018	England	39–18	Argentina	Parc des Sports Et de l'Amitié, Narbonne
	18:30	Try: Olowofela (2) 6' c, 35' m Walker (2) 14' c, 44' c Smith 79' c Con: Grayson (3/4) 7', 15', 45'; Hardwick (1/1) 80'; Pen: Grayson (1/2) 41'; Hardwick (1/1) 62'		Try: Chocobares 3' c Pedemonte 25' m Con: Daireaux (1/2) 4'; Pen: Daireaux (1/2) 9'; De La Vega Mendia (1/1) 60'

Match 7	3 June 2018	Scotland	13–29	Argentina	Stade Aimé Giral, Perpignan
	14:00	Try: McLelland 26' c Con: Chapman (1/1) 27'; Pen: Chapman (2/3) 41', 48'		Try: Collado Castro 1' c Herrera Rezzonico 20' m Carreras 70' c Penalty try 79'; Con: Daireaux (2/3) 2', 71'; Pen: Daireaux (1/1) 40'

Match 8	3 June 2018	England	43–5	Italy	Stade Aimé Giral, Perpignan
	16:30	Try: Smith (2) 6' c, 55' c Parton 22' c Loader (2) 26' c, 36' m Ibitoye 52' m Brand 64' m Con: Smith (4/6) 7', 23', 27', 56'		Try: Koffi 34' m

Match 15	7 June 2018	Italy	30–26	Argentina	Stade de la Méditerranée, Béziers
	18:30	Try: Mazza (2) 3' m, 51' m D'Onofrio 19' c Manni 30' c Con: Di Marco (2/4) 20', 31'; Pen: Di Marco (1/1) 38'; Rizzi (1/1) 71'		Try: Herrera Rezzonico 33' m Carreras (2) 41' c, 65' c Ruiz 79' c Con: Daireaux (1/2) 42'; De La Vega Mendia (2/2) 66', 80'

Match 16	7 June 2018	England	35–10	Scotland	Stade de la Méditerranée, Béziers
	21:00	Try: Ibitoye (2) 4' c, 50' m Cutting 18' m Scott 21' m Kpoku 70' m Williams 73' m Con: Hardwick (1/6) 5'; Pen: Hardwick (1/1) 57'		Try: Rowe 38' c Con: Thompson (1/1) 39'; Pen: Thompson (1/2) 12'

=== Pool C ===
Team	Pld	W	D	L	PF	PA	−/+	TF	TA	BP	Pts
France	3	3	0	0	96	65	+31	13	10	2	14
South Africa	3	2	0	1	92	90	+2	15	11	3	11
Georgia	3	1	0	2	63	77	–14	8	11	1	5
Ireland	3	0	0	3	61	80	–19	8	12	2	2

Match 1	30 May 2018	South Africa	33–27	Georgia	Stade Aimé Giral, Perpignan
	18:30	Try: Simelane 9' m Uys (2) 25' c, 55' c Green 42' c Burger 48' c Con: Willemse (4/5) 26', 43', 49', 56'	Report	Try: Lomidze 13' c Tapladze 38' c Dvalishvili 71' c Con: Aprasidze (3/3) 14', 39'; Abzhandadze (1/1) 72'; Pen: Aprasidze (2/2) 17', 52'

Match 2	30 May 2018	France	26–24	Ireland	Stade Aimé Giral, Perpignan
	21:00	Try: Marty (2) 4' m, 50' c Coville 42' c Ntamack 44' c Con: Ntamack (3/4) 43', 45', 51'		Try: Dunleavy 20' c O'Sullivan 40+1' c Byrne 71' c Con: Byrne (3/3) 21', 40+2', 72'; Pen: Byrne (1/2) 17'

Match 9	3 June 2018	France	24–12	Georgia	Stade de la Méditerranée, Béziers
	14:00	Try: Lavault 24' c Vincent 39' c Etcheverry 55' c Con: Carbonel (3/3) 25', 40', 56'; Pen: Carbonel (1/1) 9'		Try: Jalaghonia 11' c Dzagnidze 68' m Con: Aprasidze (1/1) 12'

Match 12	3 June 2018	South Africa	30–17	Ireland	Parc des Sports Et de l'Amitié, Narbonne
	16:30	Try: Burger 1' c Du Plessis 19' m Simelane (3) 51' m, 57' m, 76' m Con: Willemse (1/2) 2'; Pen: Lombard (1/2) 68'		Try: Sweetman-Doris 34' c Silvester 43' c Con: Dean (2/2) 35', 44'; Pen: Dean (1/1) 22'

Match 17	7 June 2018	Ireland	20–24	Georgia	Parc des Sports Et de l'Amitié, Narbonne
	18:30	Try: Dean 32' m Daly 77' c Wojtkowicz 80+1' m Con: Dean (1/3) 78'; Pen: Dean (1/1) 13'		Try: Machaladze 10' c Svanidze 21' c Abzhandadze 43' c Con: Aprasidze (3/3) 11', 22', 44'; Pen: Aprasidze (1/1) 16'

Match 18	7 June 2018	South Africa	29–46	France	Parc des Sports Et de l'Amitié, Narbonne
	21:00	Try: Erasmus 36' c Van der Merwe 46' m Simelane 63' m Tshakweni 69' m Sandi 74' c Con: Dobela (1/1) 37'; Lombard (1/4) 75'		Try: Joseph (2) 7' c, 19' c Carbonel 15' m Barassi 26' c Ntamack 33' c Gros 53' c Con: Carbonel (3/4) 8', 34', 54'; Ntamack (2/2) 20', 27'; Pen: Carbonel (2/3) 13', 79'

=== Pool stage standings ===
Pos	Team	Pool	Pld	−/+	Pts
Finals
1	England	B	3	+84	15
2	New Zealand	A	3	+108	14
3	France	C	3	+31	14
4	South Africa	C	3	+2	11
5–8th place play-offs
5	Italy	B	3	–33	10
6	Wales	A	3	–26	8
7	Argentina	B	3	–9	7
8	Australia	A	3	+21	6
9–12th place play-offs
9	Georgia	C	3	–14	5
10	Ireland	C	3	–18	2
11	Scotland	B	3	–42	1
12	Japan	A	3	–103	1

== Knockout stage ==
=== 9–12th place play-offs ===
Semi-finals
Ireland	29
Scotland	45
Georgia	24
Japan	22

Ninth place
Scotland	31
Georgia	39
Eleventh place
Ireland	39
Japan	33

==== Semi-finals ====
12 June 2018
16:00

Ireland	29–45	Scotland
Try: Byrne 10' c Peter Sylvester 21' c O'Brien 61' c Daly 72' m Con: Byrne (2/2) 11', 22'; Dean (1/2) 62'; Pen: Byrne (1/1) 40'		Try: Richardson (2) 24' c, 32' c Trotter 37' c Graham 48' c Rowe 55' c Onojaife 68' c Con: Chapman (6/6) 25', 33', 38', 49', 56', 69'; Pen: Chapman (1/1) 7'

Stade Aimé Giral, Perpignan

12 June 2018
18:30

Georgia	24–22	Japan
Try: Lomidze 13' c Tapladze (2) 38' m, 71' c Aprasidze 77' m Con: Aprasidze (2/4) 14', 72'		Try: Ishida 7' c Vailea 29' c Yamasawa 42' m Con: Mori (2/3) 8', 30'; Pen: Mori (1/2) 20'

Stade Aimé Giral, Perpignan

==== Eleventh place ====
17 June 2018
11:00

Ireland	39–33	Japan
Try: Stewart 4' c Sheehan 10' m Sylvester 33' c O'Brien 76' m Con: Byrne (2/4) 5', 34'; Pen: Byrne (5/6) 29', 43', 47', 49', 63'		Try: Vailea (2) 15' c, 72' c Tsukayama 22' m Fifita (2) 55' c, 59' c Con: Mori (4/5) 16', 56', 60', 73'

Stade de la Méditerranée, Béziers

==== Ninth place ====
17 June 2018
13:30

Scotland	31–39	Georgia
Try: Smith 7' m Trotter (2) 14' c, 33' c Rowe 71' m Miller 75' c Con: Chapman (2/3) 15', 34'; Thompson (1/2) 76'		Try: Japaridze 2' m Marjanishvili (2) 21' c, 63' c Gigolashvili (2) 42' c, 55' c Con: Abzhandadze (4/4) 22', 43', 56', 64'; Pen: Abzhandadze (1/1) 49', 79'

Stade de la Méditerranée, Béziers

=== 5–8th place play-offs ===
Semi-finals
Wales	15
Argentina	39
Italy	15
Australia	44

Fifth place
Argentina	15
Australia	41
Seventh place
Wales	34
Italy	17

==== Semi-finals ====
12 June 2018
14:00

Wales	15–39	Argentina
Try: Conbeer 17' c Baldwin 32' m Con: Evans (1/2) 18'; Pen: Evans (1/1) 53'		Try: Nogues 23' m Penalty try 39'; Carreras 41' c Molina 54' c Avellaneda 75' c Con: De La Vega Mendia (3/4) 42', 55', 76'; Pen: De La Vega Mendia (2/6) 14', 62'

Parc des Sports Et de l'Amitié, Narbonne

12 June 2018
16:30

Italy	15–44	Australia
Try: D'Onofrio (3) 13' m, 20' m, 66' m		Try: Hockings 17' m Stewart 28' c McReight (2) 42' c, 73' m Francis 61' c Kuenzle 75' c Con: Lonergan (3/4) 29', 43', 62'; Harrison (1/2) 76'; Pen: Lonergan (2/2) 23', 65'

Parc des Sports Et de l'Amitié, Narbonne

==== Seventh place ====
17 June 2018
16:00

Wales	34–17	Italy
Try: Conbeer 11' c Davis 23' c Penalty try 40'; Llewellyn 67' c Con: Evans (3/3) 12', 24', 68'; Pen: Evans (2/2) 3', 61'		Try: D'Onofrio 19' c Taddia 64' m Romano 74' m Con: Rizzi (1/3) 20'

Stade de la Méditerranée, Béziers

==== Fifth place ====
17 June 2018
14:00

Argentina	15–41	Australia
Try: Carreras 14' c Grondona 70' m Con: De La Vega Mendia (1/2) 15'; Pen: De La Vega Mendia (1/1) 46'		Try: Hockings 8' c Maafu 21' c Ross 56' c Hansen 77' c Lucas 80' c Con: R. Lonergan (2/2) 9', 22'; Harrison (2/2) 57', 78'; Hockings (1/1) 80+1'; Pen: Lonergan (2/2) 26', 51'

Stade de la Méditerranée, Béziers

=== Finals ===
Semi-finals
England	32
South Africa	31
New Zealand	7
France	16

Final
England	25
France	33
Third place
South Africa	40
New Zealand	30

==== Semi-finals ====
12 June 2018
19:00

England	32–31	South Africa
Try: Parton 10' m Hardwick 15' c White 22' c Olowofela 60' c Con: Smith (3/4) 16', 23', 61'; Pen: Smith (2/2) 39', 48'		Try: Sandi 32' c Uys 44' m Nortjé 52' c Rass 67' m Ntlabakanye 74' c Con: Lombard (3/5) 33', 53', 75'

Parc des Sports Et de l'Amitié, Narbonne

12 June 2018
21:00

New Zealand	7–16	France
Try: Plummer 69' c Con: Plummer (1/1) 70'		Try: Ntamack 42' c Con: Carbonel (1/1) 43'; Pen: Carbonel (3/4) 30', 49', 63'

Stade Aimé Giral, Perpignan

==== Third place ====
17 June 2018
16:30

South Africa	40–30	New Zealand
Try: Green (2) 1' c, 43' c Sandi 16' c Nortjé 61' m Simelane 63' c Ntlabakanye 74' c Con: Lombard (5/6) 2', 17', 44', 64', 75'		Try: Renton 3' c Plummer 13' m Riedlinger-Kapa 28' c Clarke 80' m Con: Plummer (2/4) 4', 29'; Pen: Plummer (2/4) 8', 24'

Stade de la Méditerranée, Béziers

==== Final ====
17 June 2018
19:00

England	25–33	France
Try: Olowofela (2) 40+1' m, 78' c Heyes 71' c Con: Grayson (2/3) 72', 79'; Pen: Smith (2/2) 21', 63'	Report	Try: Woki 25' m Séguret 74' c Con: Carbonel (1/2) 75'; Pen: Carbonel (7/7) 4', 19', 37', 41', 53', 56', 68'

Stade de la Méditerranée, Béziers

== Statistics ==
The player statistics for the 2018 U20 Championship:

Top point scorers
Pos	Player	Points
1	Louis Carbonel	60
2	Harry Plummer	53
3	Cai Evans	46
4	Harry Byrne	42
5	Charlie Chapman	38
5	Marcus Smith	38
5	Ryan Lonergan	38
8	Gela Aprasidze	30
8	Giovanni D'Onofrio	30
8	Wandisile Simelane	30

Top try scorers
Pos	Player	Tries
1	Giovanni D'Onofrio	6
1	Wandisile Simelane	6
3	Jordan Olowofela	5
4	Halatoa Vailea	4
4	Jamie Spowart	4
6	14 players	3

== Final placings ==
Pos	Team	Pld	W	D	L	PF	PA	−/+	TF	TA
1	France	5	5	0	0	145	106	+39	16	14
2	England	5	4	0	1	174	97	+77	25	11
3	South Africa	5	3	0	2	163	152	+11	26	19
4	New Zealand	5	3	0	2	173	84	+95	24	10
5–8th place play-offs
5	Australia	5	3	0	2	178	102	+76	23	13
6	Argentina	5	2	0	3	127	138	−11	17	17
7	Wales	5	3	0	2	103	136	−33	11	18
8	Italy	5	2	0	3	94	173	−79	15	24
9–12th place play-offs
9	Georgia	5	3	0	2	126	130	−4	17	19
10	Scotland	5	1	0	4	125	149	−24	16	23
11	Ireland	5	1	0	4	129	158	−29	16	23
12	Japan	5	0	0	5	91	202	−111	14	29
