= 1998 in Wales =

- Centuries: 18th; 19th; 20th; 21st
- Decades: 1970s; 1980s; 1990s; 2000s; 2010s
- See also: List of years in Wales; Timeline of Welsh history 1998 in The United Kingdom England Scotland Elsewhere

This article is about the particular significance of the year 1998 to Wales and its people.

== Incumbents ==
- Secretary of State for Wales
  - Ron Davies (until 27 October)
  - Alun Michael
- Archbishop of Wales – Alwyn Rice Jones, Bishop of St Asaph
- Archdruid of the National Eisteddfod of Wales – Dafydd Rowlands

== Events ==
- 24 February – The Criminal Cases Review Commission overturns the murder charge of Mahmood Hussein Mattan, who was executed in 1952 for killing a Cardiff shopkeeper.
- February – Britain's first official register of historic landscapes is published by Cadw. It lists 36 landscapes in Wales of outstanding historic interest.
- 6 March – Flintshire Bridge is officially opened.
- 8–9 April – Torrential rain over eastern Wales results in widespread flooding.
- 13 April – Montgomeryshire MP Lembit Öpik is seriously injured in a paragliding accident in his constituency.
- May – Cistercian Way long-distance trail originates.
- 31 July – The Government of Wales Act 1998, that will establish a devolved Welsh Assembly, receives its Royal Assent.
- August – Ron Davies is appointed to the highest order of the Gorsedd of the Bards at the 1998 National Eisteddfod in Bridgend.
- 19 September – Ron Davies is elected in preference to Rhodri Morgan as Labour's candidate for First Secretary of the Assembly.
- 22–31 October – Heavy rainfall across Wales results in river levels rising to warning levels. Flood plains are inundated and there is extensive flooding of houses and other property.
- 27 October – Ron Davies resigns as Secretary of State for Wales after being mugged in an incident on Clapham Common, following what he described as an "error of judgment".
- 18 November – Jon Owen Jones, MP, Parliamentary Under Secretary of State for Wales, announces that the Environment Agency has been asked for a report on the October floods.
- November – Maenofferen slate quarry at Blaenau Ffestiniog ceases production.

== Arts and literature ==
- Bryn Terfel gives a recital at Carnegie Hall.

=== Awards ===
- Glyndŵr Award – Iwan Bala
- National Eisteddfod of Wales (held in Bridgend)
- National Eisteddfod of Wales: Chair – withheld
- National Eisteddfod of Wales: Crown – Emyr Lewis, "Rhyddid"
- National Eisteddfod of Wales: Prose Medal – Eurig Wyn, Blodyn Tatws
- Wales Book of the Year:
  - English language: Mike Jenkins – Wanting to Belong
  - Welsh language: Iwan Llwyd – Dan Ddylanwad
- Gwobr Goffa Daniel Owen – Geraint V. Jones, Semtecs

=== New books ===
==== English language ====
- Gillian Clarke – Five Fields
- James Hawes – Rancid Aluminium
- Rhys Hughes – Rawhead & Bloody Bones
- Mario Risoli – When Pele Broke our Hearts: Wales and the 1958 World Cup
- Sarah Waters – Tipping the Velvet

==== Welsh language ====
- Dafydd Huws – Dyddiadur Dyn Dŵad
- Huw Ethall – Pennar Davies: Y Dyn a'i Waith

== Film ==
- Anthony Hopkins and Catherine Zeta-Jones star in The Mask of Zorro.

=== Welsh language films ===
- Bride of War, starring Huw Garmon (in Welsh, English, French, German and Polish).

== Music ==
- Indie music band Terris are formed in Newport.
- Anweledig – Sombreros yn y Glaw
- Charlotte Church – Voice of an Angel
- Melys – Rumours and Curses
- Bonnie Tyler – All in One Voice

== Broadcasting ==
=== Welsh-language television ===
- November – A new digital channel is launched, broadcasting in Welsh for twelve hours a day.

=== English-language television ===
- Barry Welsh Is Coming wins the BAFTA Wales Light Entertainment award.

== Sport ==
- BBC Wales Sports Personality of the Year – Iwan Thomas
- Commonwealth Games – September
  - Kelly Morgan wins the badminton women's singles;
  - Iwan Thomas wins the men's 400 metres;
  - Desmond Davies wins the men's individual skeet shooting;
  - Wales win a total of 15 medals, including the three golds.
- Snooker
  - 8 February – Mark Williams wins his first Masters title.

== Births ==
- 12 March – Will Jones, rugby player
- 5 June – Dafydd Jones, footballer
- 18 December – Cameron Coxe, footballer
- 25 December – Will Griffiths, rugby player
- 29 December – Mark Harris, footballer

== Deaths ==
- 3 January – Tony Duncan, golfer and cricketer, 83
- 18 February – Robbie James, footballer, 40 (collapsed and died during match)
- 1 April – Mary Wynne Warner, mathematician, 65
- 2 April – Dai Davies, trade unionist, 88
- 4 April – Käte Bosse-Griffiths, author, 87
- 14 April – Dorothy Squires, singer, 83
- 11 May – Vronwy Hankey (née Fisher), archaeologist, 81
- 13 May – Arthur Rees, Wales international rugby player and police Chief Constable, 85
- 17 May – Hugh Cudlipp, journalist, 84
- 5 July – James Eirian Davies, minister and poet, 80
- 23 July – R. Tudur Jones, theologian and politician, 77
- 28 July – Nancy Evans, table tennis player, 95
- 3 August (in Waipukurau, New Zealand) – Ronnie Boon, Wales rugby union player, 89
- 12 September – Horace Charles Jones, poet, 92
- 5 October – Megs Jenkins, actress, 81
- 31 October – Eddie Perry, footballer, 89
- 16 December – Kenyon Jones, rugby player, 87
- 16 December – Tommy Davies, boxer, 78
- 31 December – Alan Morris, footballer, 44

== See also ==
- 1998 in Northern Ireland
