= 2017 World Rugby Under 20 Championship =

Tournament details
- Host: Georgia
- Date: 31 May – 18 June 2017
- Teams: 12

Final positions
- Champions: New Zealand
- Runner-up: England
- Third place: South Africa
- Fourth place: France

Tournament statistics
- Matches played: 30
- Tries scored: 239 (7.97 per match)
- Top scorer(s): (New Zealand) Tiaan Falcon (69)
- Most tries: (South Africa) Juarno Augustus (7)

The 2017 World Rugby Under 20 Championship was the tenth annual international rugby union competition for Under 20 national teams. The event was organised in Georgia by rugby's governing body, World Rugby. Twelve nations played in the tournament, which was held in Tbilisi and Kutaisi from 31 May to 18 June.

== Teams ==
The following teams participated in the 2017 World Rugby U20 Championship:

Pool	Team	No of Tournaments	Position 2016	Position 2017	Previous best result	Notes
A	Australia	10	6th	6th	Runner-up (2010)	
A	England	10	1st	2nd	Champions (2013, 2014, 2016)	
A	Samoa	7	DNP	12th	Eighth (2014)	Promoted from 2016 World Rugby Under 20 Trophy; Relegated to 2018 World Rugby Under 20 Trophy
A	Wales	10	7th	7th	Runner-up (2013)	
B	Ireland	10	2nd	9th	Runner-up (2016)	
B	Italy	8	11th	8th	Eleventh (2008, 2011, 2014, 2015, 2016)	
B	New Zealand	10	5th	1st	Champions (2008, 2009, 2010, 2011, 2015)	
B	Scotland	10	8th	5th	Eighth (2015, 2016)	
C	Argentina	10	3rd	11th	Third (2016)	
C	France	10	9th	4th	Fourth (2011, 2015)	
C	Georgia	2	10th	10th	Tenth (2016)	
C	South Africa	10	4th	3rd	Champions (2012)	

== Match officials ==
The following officials will oversee the thirty matches:

Referees

- Mike Adamson (Scotland)
- Nic Berry (Australia)
- Pierre Brousset (France)
- Pablo de Luca (Argentina)
- Tom Foley (England)
- Dan Jones (Wales)
- Frank Murphy (Ireland)
- Jamie Nutbrown (New Zealand)
- Jaco van Heerden (South Africa)

Assistant Referees

- (Georgia (country)) Nika Amashukeli (Georgia)
- Tasuku Kawahara (Japan)
- Andrea Piardi (Italy)
- Christophe Ridley (England)
- (Georgia (country)) Shota Tevzadze (Georgia)

Television match officials

- Johan Greeff (South Africa)
- Jon Mason (Wales)
- Charles Samson (Scotland)

== Pool stage ==
The fixtures were released in September 2016.

Key to colours in group tables
Teams advanced to finals
Teams in the 5–8th place play-offs
Teams in the 9–12th place play-offs

All times are in Georgian Standard Time (UTC+04)

Points were awarded in the Pool Stage via the standard points system:

- 4 points for a win
- 2 points for a draw
- 1 bonus scoring point for scoring 4 or more tries
- 1 bonus losing point for losing by 7 or less points
- 0 points for a loss above 7 points

If at completion of the Pool Stage two or more teams were level on points, the following tiebreakers were applied:

1. The winner of the Match in which the two tied Teams have played each other;
2. The Team which has the best difference between points scored for and points scored against in all its Pool Matches;
3. The Team which has the best difference between tries scored for and tries scored against in all its Pool Matches;
4. The Team which has scored most points in all its Pool Matches;
5. The Team which has scored most tries in all its Pool Matches; and
6. If none of the above produce a result, then it will be resolved with a toss of a coin.

=== Pool A ===
Team	Pld	W	D	L	PF	PA	PD	TF	TA	BP	Pts
England	3	3	0	0	128	58	+70	18	6	2	14
Australia	3	2	0	1	76	63	+13	8	7	2	10
Wales	3	1	0	2	93	78	+15	13	9	2	6
Samoa	3	0	0	3	63	161	–98	7	24	1	1

Match 1	31 May 2017	England	74–17	Samoa	Avchala Rugby Stadium
	13:00	Try: Crossdale (2) 2' m, 51' m Mercer (2) 9' c, 34' c Malins 12' m Mitchell 21' m Morris (2) 27' c, 67' c Ibitoye (2) 38' c, 69' c Street 42' m Knight 60' c Con: Malins (4/7) 10', 28', 35', 39'; Umaga (3/5) 61', 67', 70'	Match details	Try: Filipo (2) 64' c, 72' c Con: Paisami (2/2) 65', 73'; Pen: Ene (1/2) 25'	Referee: (Wales) Dan Jones

Match 4	31 May 2017	Australia	24–17	Wales	Avchala Rugby Stadium
	20:30	Try: Hutchison 35' c Johnson-Holmes 58' c Perese 77' c Con: Goddard (1/1) 36'; Nucifora (2/2) 60', 79'; Pen: Goddard (1/2) 30'	Match details	Try: Lewis 4' c Blacker 55' c Con: Robson (2/2) 5', 56'; Drop: Robson (1/1) 76'	Referee: (Ireland) Frank Murphy

Match 8	4 June 2017	Australia	33–26	Samoa	Avchala Rugby Stadium
	15:30	Try: Hutchison 11' m Riley 47' c Tupou 54' m McNamara 59' c Con: Nucifora (1/2) 48'; Goddard (1/2) 59'; Pen: Nucifora (1/2) 15'; Goddard (2/2) 70', 80'	Match details	Try: Teleʻa 17' c Pohla (2) 42' m, 65' m Con: Paisami (1/2) 19'; Pen: Paisami (1/3) 35'; Ene (2/2) 72', 76'	Referee: (South Africa) Jaco van Heerden

Match 10	4 June 2017	England	34–22	Wales	Avchala Rugby Stadium
	20:30	Try: Clegg 10' c Ibitoye (2) 13' c, 28' c Mitchell 65' c Con: Malins (4/4) 10', 13', 30', 66'; Pen: Malins (1/2) 33'; Drop: Malins (1/1) 69'	Match details	Try: Assiratti 39' c Penalty try 48'; Goodchild 76' m Con: Robson (1/1) 40'; Pen: Robson (1/1) 6'	Referee: (France) Pierre Brousset

Match 13	8 June 2017	Wales	54–20	Samoa	Avchala Rugby Stadium
	13:00	Try: Rosser 10' c Ward 20' c Lewis-Hughes (2) 29' c, 49' m Moore 39' c Blacker 70' c Griffiths 74' c Goodchild 80' c Con: B. Jones (5/6) 10', 20', 29', 40', 71'; Robson (2/2) 75', 80'	Match details	Try: Pohla 56' c Enoka 67' c Con: Ene (2/2) 58', 68'; Pen: Ene (2/2) 5', 9'	Referee: (New Zealand) Jamie Nutbrown

Match 16	8 June 2017	England	20–19	Australia	Avchala Rugby Stadium
	20:30	Try: Ibitoye 23' c Street 51' c Con: Malins (2/2) 24', 52'; Pen: Brophy-Clews (1/1) 7'; Malins (1/1) 78'	Match details	Try: Tuipulotu 9' c Con: Goddard (1/1) 10'; Pen: Goddard (3/4) 2', 15', 21'; Nucifora (1/2) 72'	Referee: (Scotland) Mike Adamson

=== Pool B ===
Team	Pld	W	D	L	PF	PA	PD	TF	TA	BP	Pts
New Zealand	3	3	0	0	179	49	+130	26	7	3	15
Scotland	3	2	0	1	69	86	–17	11	10	1	9
Italy	3	1	0	2	64	106	–42	8	14	2	6
Ireland	3	0	0	3	52	123	–71	5	19	2	2

Match 5	31 May 2017	New Zealand	42–20	Scotland	AIA Arena
	13:00	Try: Faingaanuku (3) 2' c, 25' c, 80' m Aumua 13' m Papalii 45' m Leger 50' c Con: Falcon (3/6) 4', 25', 51'; Pen: Falcon (2/3) 43', 57'	Match details	Try: Renwick 11' m Graham 19' m Henderson 66' c Con: Henderson (1/1) 67'; Pen: Eastgate (1/1) 41'	Referee: (England) Tom Foley

Match 6	31 May 2017	Ireland	21–22	Italy	AIA Arena
	15:30	Try: Nash (2) 41' m, 46' c Con: Dean (1/2) 47'; Pen: Dean (2/3) 27', 63'; Frawley (1/2) 70'	Match details	Try: Fischetti 10' m Bianchi 16' c Cioffi 76' c Con: Rizzi (1/2) 18'; Cioffi (1/1) 77'; Drop: Rizzi (1/1) 28'	Referee: (Scotland) Mike Adamson

Match 11	4 June 2017	Ireland	28–32	Scotland	AIA Arena
	13:00	Try: Stafford 21' c Kelly (2) 57' c, 75' m Con: Dean (1/1) 22'; Tynan (1/2) 58'; Pen: Dean (2/2) 17', 51'; Tynan (1/1) 67'	Match details	Try: McCann 28' c Renwick 39' m Graham 53' c Eastgate 61' m Nairn 68' m Con: Eastgate (2/5) 29', 54'; Pen: Eastgate (1/1) 47'	Referee: (Wales) Dan Jones

Match 12	4 June 2017	New Zealand	68–26	Italy	AIA Arena
	15:30	Try: Jordan 9' c Leger 16' c Clarke (2) 20' c, 42' c Nareki 28' m Ennor 32' c Rakete-Stones 66' c Tua 69' m Choat 79' c Con: Falcon (5/6) 10', 18', 21', 33', 42'; Leger (2/3) 67', 80'; Pen: Falcon (3/3) 4', 8', 52'	Match details	Try: Cornelli 1' c Cannone 14' c Lamaro 38' c Rollero 48' m Con: Di Marco (3/4) 2', 15', 39'	Referee: (Argentina) Pablo de Luca

Match 17	8 June 2017	Scotland	17–16	Italy	AIA Arena
	13:00	Try: Nairn 6' m Crosbie 15' c Dodd 65' m Con: Eastgate (1/2) 16'	Match details	Try: Zanon 10' c Con: Rizzi (1/1) 11'; Pen: Rizzi (3/3) 36', 50', 57'	Referee: (Australia) Nic Berry

Match 18	8 June 2017	Ireland	3–69	New Zealand	AIA Arena
	15:30	Pen: Fitzgerald (1/1) 4'	Match details	Try: Clarke (3) 10' c, 36' m, 60' c Jordan (3) 17' m, 23' c, 77' c Ennor 21' c Christie 42' c Enari 43' m McKay 67' c Falcon 72' m Con: Falcon (7/11) 11', 22', 25', 43', 61', 68', 77'	Referee: (South Africa) Jaco van Heerden

=== Pool C ===
Team	Pld	W	D	L	PF	PA	PD	TF	TA	BP	Pts
South Africa	3	2	1	0	133	51	+82	19	7	2	12
France	3	2	1	0	103	48	+55	14	5	1	11
Argentina	3	1	0	2	76	124	–48	10	16	2	6
Georgia	3	0	0	3	40	129	–89	4	19	0	0

Match 2	31 May 2017	South Africa	23–23	France	Avchala Rugby Stadium
	15:30	Try: Augustus (2) 1' c, 80' c Con: Bosch (2/2) 1', 80'; Pen: Bosch (3/3) 6', 46', 62'	Match details	Try: Buros 7' m Dufour 27' c Couilloud 41' m Con: Ntamack (1/3) 28'; Drop: Ntamack (2/2) 48', 54'	Referee: (Australia) Nic Berry

Match 3	31 May 2017	Argentina	37–26	Georgia	Avchala Rugby Stadium
	18:00	Try: Kremer 6' m González 11' m Ruiz 25' c Sauze 61' c Stavile 67' c Con: Albornoz (2/4) 26', 62'; Daireaux (1/1) 68'; Pen: Albornoz (2/3) 44', 46'	Match details	Try: Kveseladze 65' c Tcheishvili 71' c Con: Aprasidze (1/1) 66'; Gogoladze (1/1) 72'; Pen: Aprasidze (4/4) 5', 18' 33', 37'	Referee: (France) Pierre Brousset

Match 7	4 June 2017	Argentina	25–26	France	Avchala Rugby Stadium
	13:00	Try: Daireaux (2) 35' c, 44' c Oviedo 67' m Con: Carreras (1/1) 36'; Daireaux (1/2) 45'; Pen: Albornoz (1/1) 74'; Drop: Albornoz (1/1) 76'	Match details	Try: Ngandebe 51' c Boniface 64' m Mauvaka 80' m Con: Arrate (1/2) 52'; Pen: Ntamack (1/1) 3'; Arrate (2/2) 59', 71'	Referee: (New Zealand) Jamie Nutbrown

Match 9	4 June 2017	South Africa	38–14	Georgia	Avchala Rugby Stadium
	18:00	Try: Augustus 16' c Simelane (2) 34' c, 56' c Libbok (2) 36' m, 69' c Penxe 54' m Con: Cilliers (2/3) 17', 35'; Bosch (2/3) 58', 70'	Match details	Try: Tabidze 29' c Gogoladze 64' c Con: Aprasidze (2/2) 30', 65'	Referee: (England) Tom Foley

Match 14	8 June 2017	Argentina	14–72	South Africa	Avchala Rugby Stadium
	15:30	Try: Luna 14' c Malanos 29' c Con: Albornoz (2/2) 14', 30'	Match details	Try: Grobbelaar (2) 5' c, 9' m Lombard (2) 16' c, 51' m Willemse 35' m Penxe 38' c Augustus 42' c Papier 57' c Libbok 73' m De Villiers 74' c Cilliers 78' c Con: Bosch (7/11) 6', 17', 38', 43', 58', 75', 79'; Pen: Bosch (1/2) 47'	Referee: (Ireland) Frank Murphy

Match 15	8 June 2017	France	54–0	Georgia	Avchala Rugby Stadium
	18:00	Try: Couilloud 2' c Boniface 5' c Mauvaka 11' c Jalibert 36' c Decron 48' m Tolofua 52' c Roumat 64' c Pesenti 80' c Con: Jalibert (6/7) 3', 6', 12', 37', 54', 65'; Arrate (1/1) 80'	Match details		Referee: (Argentina) Pablo de Luca

=== Current combined standings ===
Overall Standings
Pool Pos	Seed	Team	Pld	W	D	L	PF	PA	PD	TF	TA	BP	Pts
B1	1	New Zealand	3	3	0	0	179	49	+130	26	7	3	15
A1	2	England	3	3	0	0	128	58	+70	18	6	2	14
C1	3	South Africa	3	2	1	0	133	51	+82	19	7	2	12
C2	4	France	3	2	1	0	103	48	+55	14	5	1	11
A2	5	Australia	3	2	0	1	76	63	+13	8	7	2	10
B2	6	Scotland	3	2	0	1	69	86	–17	11	10	1	9
A3	7	Wales	3	1	0	2	93	78	+15	13	9	2	6
B3	8	Italy	3	1	0	2	64	106	–42	8	14	2	6
C3	9	Argentina	3	1	0	2	76	124	–48	10	16	2	6
B4	10	Ireland	3	0	0	3	52	123	–71	5	19	2	2
A4	11	Samoa	3	0	0	3	63	161	–98	7	24	1	1
C4	12	Georgia	3	0	0	3	40	129	–89	4	19	0	0

== Knockout stage ==
=== 9–12th place play-offs ===
Semi-finals
Ireland	52
Samoa	26
Argentina	25
Georgia	26

9th place
Ireland	24
Georgia	18
11th place
Samoa	42
Argentina	53

==== Semi-finals ====
Match 19	13 June 2017	Ireland	52–26	Samoa	Avchala Rugby Stadium
	13:00	Try: Kelleher (2) 4' c, 60' c Cooper 10' m Wycherley 20' c Dowling 38' c Nash 40' m Frawley 64' c Doris 77' c Con: Dean (6/8) 4', 20', 39', 61', 65', 78'	Match details	Try: Solipo 32' m Enoka 57' c Ah See 68' c Ielemia 80' c Con: Ene (3/4) 58', 69', 80'	Referee: (England) Tom Foley

Match 20	13 June 2017	Argentina	25–26	Georgia	Mikheil Meskhi Stadium
	15:30	Try: Delguy 16' m Ferrario 41' c Malanos 80' c Con: Daireaux (2/2) 42', 80'; Pen: Albornoz (2/2) 10', 20'	Report	Try: Saghinadze 3' c Spanderashvili 12' c Con: Aprasidze (2/2) 4', 13'; Pen: Aprasidze (4/6) 25', 34', 38', 76'	Referee: (South Africa) Jaco van Heerden

==== 11th place game ====
Match 25	18 June 2017	Samoa	42–53	Argentina	Avchala Rugby Stadium
	12:00	Try: Paisami (2) 32' c, 71' c Enoka 43' c Moore 48' c Fonoti 77' c Pohla 80' c Con: Paisami (5/5) 33', 44', 48', 71', 77'; Tinei (1/1) 80'	Match details	Try: J. González 7' c Delguy (2) 11' c, 36' c L. González (2) 14' c, 60' c Albornoz 45' c Malanos 74' m Con: Albornoz (6/7) 8', 12', 15', 37', 46', 61'; Pen: Albornoz (2/2) 2', 64'	Referee: (France) Pierre Brousset

==== 9th place game ====
Match 26	18 June 2017	Ireland	24–18	Georgia	Mikheil Meskhi Stadium
	13:00	Try: Tynan 20' c Doris 44' c Boyle 49' c Con: Dean (3/3) 21', 45', 50'; Pen: Dean (1/1) 73'	Match details	Try: Gogichashvili 31' c Aprasidze 54' c Con: Aprasidze (1/1) 32'; Abzhandadze (1/1) 55'; Pen: Aprasidze (2/2) 27', 60'	Referee: (Argentina) Pablo de Luca

=== 5–8th place play-offs ===
Semi-finals
Australia	42
Italy	19
Scotland	29
Wales	25

5th place
Australia	17
Scotland	24
7th place
Italy	24
Wales	25

==== Semi-finals ====
Match 22	13 June 2017	Australia	42–19	Italy	Avchala Rugby Stadium
	15:30	Try: Perese (3) 4' c, 8' c, 46' c Goddard 53' c Tuipulotu 55' c Hewat 77' c Con: Goddard (5/5) 5', 9', 48', 53', 56'; Nucifora (1/1) 78'	Match details	Try: Dal Zilio (2) 34' m, 68' c D'Onofrio 37' c Con: Rizzi (2/3) 38', 69'; Pen: Di Marco (0/1)	Referee: (Wales) Dan Jones

Match 21	13 June 2017	Scotland	29–25	Wales	Avchala Rugby Stadium
	18:00	Try: Graham (2) 20' c, 75' c McCann 27' c Hunter-Hill 34' m Con: Eastgate (3/4) 21', 28', 76'; Pen: Eastgate (1/1) 55'	Match details	Try: W. Jones 14' m Nicholas 30' c Robson 69' c Con: Robson (2/3) 30', 70'; Pen: Robson (2/2) 51', 57'	Referee: (France) Pierre Brousset

==== 7th place game ====
Match 27	18 June 2017	Wales	25–24	Italy	Avchala Rugby Stadium
	17:00	Try: Bradbury 29' c Conbeer 38' m P. Jones 67' c Con: Robson (2/3) 30', 68'; Pen: Robson (1/1) 18'; P. Jones (1/1) 74'	Match details	Try: D'Onofrio 41' c Schiabel 61' m Con: Rizzi (1/2) 42'; Pen: Rizzi (4/5) 6', 16', 33', 51'	Referee: (South Africa) Jaco van Heerden

==== 5th place game ====
Match 28	18 June 2017	Scotland	24–17	Australia	Avchala Rugby Stadium
	14:30	Try: Nairn 47' c Shiel (2) 56' c, 80' c Con: Eastgate (3/3) 49', 57', 80'; Pen: Eastgate (1/2) 38'	Match details	Try: Goddard (2) 23' c, 59' c Con: Goddard (2/2) 24', 60'; Pen: Goddard (1/2) 27'	Referee: (New Zealand) Jamie Nutbrown

=== Finals ===
Semi-finals
England	24
South Africa	22
New Zealand	39
France	26

Final
England	17
New Zealand	64
3rd place
South Africa	37
France	15

==== Semi-finals ====
Match 23	13 June 2017	England	24–22	South Africa	Mikheil Meskhi Stadium
	18:00	Try: Mercer (2) 2' c, 75' c Mitchell 15' c Con: Malins (3/3) 3', 16', 76'; Pen: Malins (1/2) 20'	Match details	Try: Augustus (2) 9' c, 40' m Van Heerden 55' c Con: Bosch (2/3) 10', 56'; Pen: Bosch (1/1) 72'	Referee: (Ireland) Frank Murphy

Match 24	13 June 2017	New Zealand	39–26	France	Mikheil Meskhi Stadium
	20:30	Try: Jordan 6' c Falcon 10' m Papalii 23' c Clarke 33' c Aumua 45' c Con: Falcon (4/5) 8', 24', 35', 46'; Pen: Falcon (2/2) 2', 77'	Match details	Try: Couilloud 49' c Pesenti 51' c Mauvaka 63' m Tauzin 69' c Con: Arrate (3/4) 50', 53', 70'	Referee: (Scotland) Mike Adamson

==== 3rd place game ====
Match 29	18 June 2017	South Africa	37–15	France	Mikheil Meskhi Stadium
	15:30	Try: Van Heerden 15' c Grobbelaar (2) 41' c, 65' m Brits 52' c Augustus 71' m Con: Libbok (3/5) 15', 42', 53'; Pen: Libbok (2/2) 48', 60'	Match details	Try: Mauvaka 27' m Couilloud 77' c Con: Couilloud (1/2) 77'; Pen: Couilloud (1/1) 34'	Referee: (England) Tom Foley

==== Final ====
Match 30	18 June 2017	England	17–64	New Zealand	Mikheil Meskhi Stadium
	18:00	Try: Earl 18' c Mitchell 52' m Bayliss 71' m Con: Malins (1/3) 19'	Match details	Try: Papalii 4' m Rakete-Stones 9' c Aumua (3) 25' c, 37' c, 60' m Walker-Leawere 28' c Jacobson (2) 40' c, 78' c McKay 46' m Christie 67' c Con: Perofeta (7/10) 10', 27', 29', 39', 40', 67', 80'	Referee: (Australia) Nic Berry
