= Rory Brand =

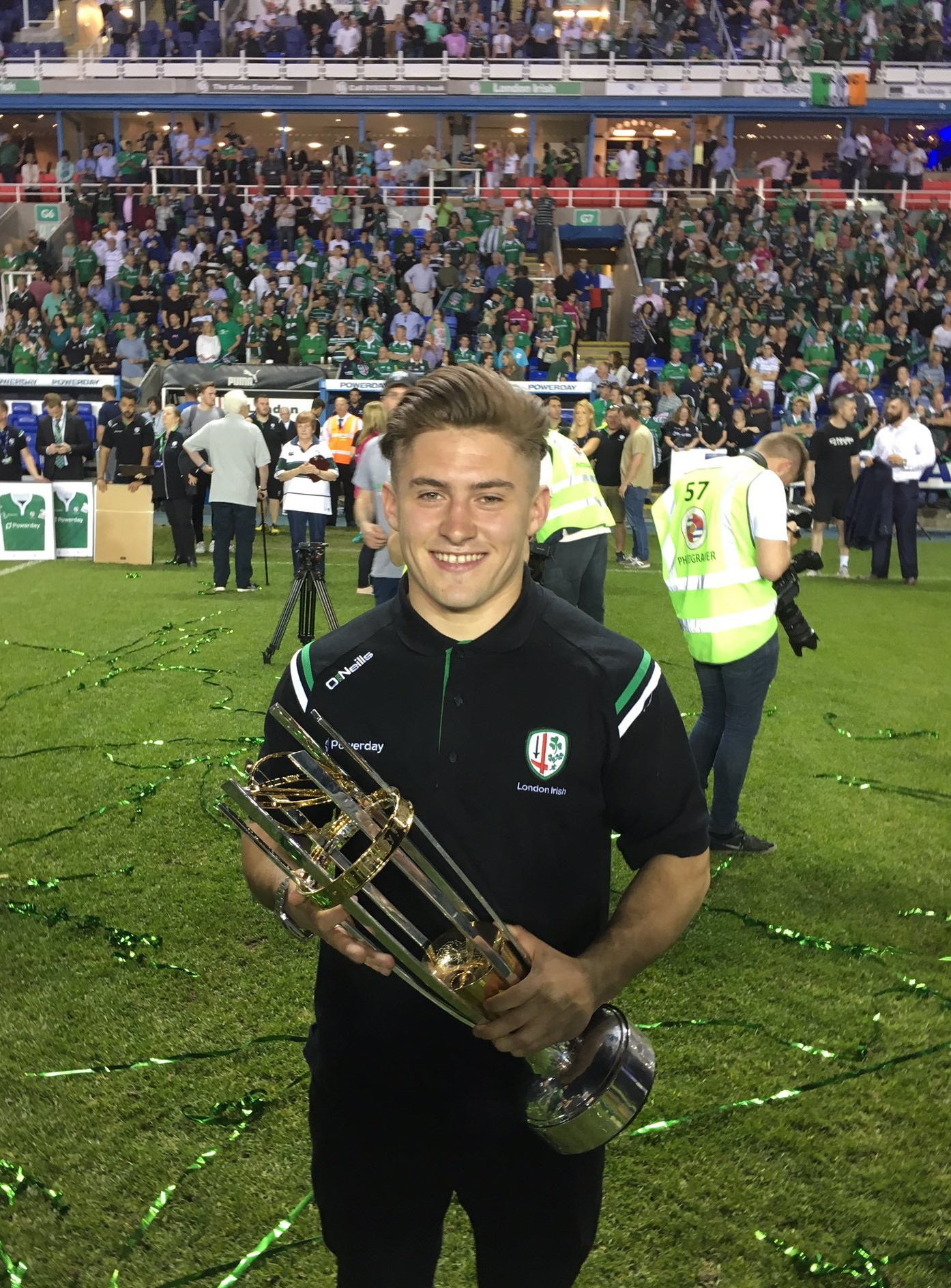
- Brand holding English Championship Cup in 2017
- Born: Rory Brand; 10 April 1998 (age 28) Glasgow, Scotland
- Height: 5 ft 6 in (1.68 m)
- Weight: 85 kg (187 lb; 13 st 5 lb)
- School: Wellington College

Rugby union career
- Position: Scrum-half
Senior career
| Years | Team | Apps | (Points) |
| 2016–22 | London Irish | 10 | (0) |
| 2022 | Watsonians | 1 | (0) |
International career
| Years | Team | Apps | (Points) |
| 2017–18 | England U20 | 11 | (5) |
- Correct as of 17 June 2018

Rory Brand (born 10 April 1998 in Scotland) is a professional rugby union player who plays Scrum-half for Watsonians.

== Early career ==
Brand was the first recipient of the Jimmy Higham Scholarship at Wellington College. Jimmy, like Rory, was a student at Standish Community High School in Wigan before becoming a PE teacher at Wellington College.

Brand was briefly on the Salford City Reds Scholarship scheme after gaining rugby league experience with Wigan St Cuthberts ARLFC and became a member of the Sale Sharks Junior Academy in 2013.

== Club career ==
In 2015, Brand joined the London Irish Academy. In February 2016, Brand helped London Irish to beat Gloucester 35–11 in the Under 18 Premiership final. Rory Brand captained London Irish at the 2017 Singha Premiership Rugby 7s.

In the 2016–17 season, Brand represented London Irish in the RFU Championship and the 2016–17 British and Irish Cup.

The following season saw Brand feature for the Exiles in the 2017–18 Anglo-Welsh Cup and European Rugby Challenge Cup.

== International career ==
In February 2015, Brand made his debut for the England U18 team in a 21–5 win over France U18 at Doncaster, having previously played for Lancashire U15, U16, the North U16, England U17 and in April 2017 England U19. In February 2017, Brand made his debut for the England U20 team off the bench in a 46–0 victory over Italy at the Northern Echo Arena during the 2017 Six Nations Under 20s Championship. On 3 January 2018, Brand was named in England under-20s squad for the 2018 Six Nations Under 20s Championship.

On 21 May 2018, Brand was named in the England Under-20 squad for the 2018 World Rugby Under 20 Championship. Brand scored a try against Italy during the pool stage and came off the bench in the final as England finished runners up to hosts France.
