= Manni (disambiguation) =

Manni is a town in Burkina Faso.

Manni may also refer to:

== Places ==
- Manni Department, a department or commune of Gnagna Province in Burkina Faso where the above town is located
- Manni, Estonia, a village

== People ==
- Alessandro Manni (born 1974), retired Italian footballer
- Domenico Maria Manni (1690 – 1788), Italian polymath, editor, and publisher
- Ettore Manni (1927–1979), Italian film actor
- Henry Manni (born 1992), Finnish paracanoer
- Keijo Manni (born 1951), Finnish wrestler
- Lodovico Manni (born 1998), Italian rugby union player
- Nicoletta Manni (born 1991), Italian prima ballerina
- Tarmo Manni (1921–1999), Finnish actor
- Victoria Manni (born 1994), Italian ice dancer
- nickname of Emmanuel Carella (born 1982), Australian pop singer
- Manfred Manni Schmidt (born 1964), German heavy metal guitarist and songwriter
- nickname of Manfred Seifert (1949–2005), German footballer
- Manni Lal (born 1942), Indian politician
- Manni Thofte (born 1953), Swedish former alpine skier

== Fictional characters ==
- one of the title characters of Nonni and Manni, a 1998 German children's television series
- Manni Bessauer, a character in Manni, der Libero, a 1981 German television series
