= Marcus Street =

English rugby union player (born 1999)

- Born: Marcus William Raymond Street; 6 February 1999 (age 27) Exeter, England
- Height: 1.85 m (6 ft 1 in)
- Weight: 119 kg (18 st 10 lb; 262 lb)
- School: Queen Elizabeth's School; Exeter College

Rugby union career
- Position: Tighthead Prop
- Current team: Exeter Chiefs
Senior career
Years	Team	Apps	(Points)
2016–2025	Exeter Chiefs	55	(5)
2025–	Saracens	0	(0)
- Correct as of 9 March 2022
International career
Years	Team	Apps	(Points)
2017	England U18	4	(5)
2017–2019	England U20	11	(10)
- Correct as of 9 March 2022

Marcus Street (born 6 February 1999) is an English professional rugby union player who plays as a tighthead prop for Premiership club Saracens.

== Rugby career ==
=== Club ===
Street is a product of the Exeter Chiefs academy and in November 2016 made his club debut against Cardiff in the Anglo-Welsh Cup. He came off the bench to replace Harry Williams in the 2020–21 Premiership Rugby final as Exeter finished runners up to Harlequins.

On 3 March 2025, it was confirmed that Street signed for Premiership rivals Saracens on an undisclosed length deal from the 2025–26 season.

=== International ===
In April 2017 Street scored a try for the England under-18 team against Scotland and also participated in the 2017 Six Nations Under 20s Championship. He was selected for the 2017 World Rugby Under 20 Championship and scored tries in pool stage games against Samoa and Australia. Street also competed in the 2018 Six Nations Under 20s Championship and 2019 Six Nations Under 20s Championship.
