= 2016–17 British and Irish Cup =

Tournament details
- Countries: England; Ireland; Wales
- Tournament format(s): Round-robin and knockout
- Date: 14 October 2016 — 21 April 2017

Tournament statistics
- Teams: 19
- Matches played: 63
- Attendance: 62,823 (997 per match)
- Highest attendance: 4,813; Ulster A v London Scottish; 13 January 2017
- Lowest attendance: 200 (x3)
- Top point scorer(s): (Ireland) Johnny McPhillips; Ulster A 62
- Top try scorer(s): (Wales) Tom Williams; Scarlets PS 8

Final
- Venue: Irish Independent Park
- Champions: Munster A (2nd title)
- Runners-up: Jersey Reds

The 2016–17 British and Irish Cup was the eighth season of the annual rugby union competition for second tier, semi-professional clubs from Britain and Ireland. London Welsh were the defending champions having won the 2015–16 final against Yorkshire Carnegie 10–33 at Headingley Carnegie Stadium, Leeds on 10 April 2016. There have been six different winners and six different losing finalists in the seven seasons of its existence. The format of the competition is similar to last season with Scottish clubs not competing. For the second consecutive season the four Welsh teams were the reserve sides of the teams competing in the Pro12 competition instead of clubs from the Welsh Premier Division.

== Competition format ==
The competition format is a pool stage followed by a knockout stage. The pool stage consists of five pools of four teams playing home and away matches. The top side in each pool, plus the three best runners-up, progress to the knockout stage. The eight quarter-finalists are ranked, with top four teams having home advantage. The four winning quarter-finalists progress to the semi-final draw. Most of the matches are played on the same weekends as the European Champions Cup and European Challenge Cup. First round matches began on 14 October 2016 and the final was held on the 21 April 2017.

== Participating teams and locations ==
The allocation of teams is as follows:

- (England) – twelve clubs from RFU Championship
- (Ireland) – four Irish provinces represented by 'A' teams
- (Wales) – four Welsh regions represented by Premiership Select teams.
Locations of the 2016-17 British & Irish Cup teams

Club	Country	League	Stadium	Capacity	Area
Bedford Blues	England	RFU Championship	Goldington Road	5,000 (1,700 seats)	Bedford
Cardiff Blues Premiership Select	Wales	N/A	Cardiff Arms Park; Sardis Road; The Wern	12,125; 7,861; 4,500	Cardiff; Pontypridd; Merthyr Tydfil
Connacht Eagles	Ireland	Irish Interprovincial Rugby Championship	Galway Sportsgrounds; Dubarry Park	9,500; 10,000	Galway; Athlone
Cornish Pirates	England	RFU Championship	Mennaye Field	4,000	Penzance
Doncaster Knights	England	RFU Championship	Castle Park	5,000	Doncaster
Ealing Trailfinders	England	RFU Championship	Trailfinders Sports Ground	3,020	West Ealing, London
Jersey Reds	(Jersey) England (Note: Jersey is listed in the English section because they play in the English RFU Championship.)	RFU Championship	St. Peter	4,000	Saint Peter
Leinster A	Ireland	Irish Interprovincial Rugby Championship	Donnybrook Stadium	6,000	Dublin
London Irish	England	RFU Championship	Madejski Stadium	7,579 (Note: Although Madejski's full capacity is 24,161, for most matches only West Stand will be open with capacity of 7,579.)	Reading, Berkshire
London Scottish	England	RFU Championship	Richmond Athletic Ground	4,500 (1,000 seats)	Richmond, London
London Welsh	England	RFU Championship	Old Deer Park	5,850 (1,000 seats)	Richmond, London
Munster A	Ireland	Irish Interprovincial Rugby Championship	Towns Park; The Showgrounds; Old Chapel; Irish Independent Park; CIT Stadium	400; 1,000; N/A; 8,200; 1,100	Midleton; Ennis; Bandon; Cork; Cork
Newport Gwent Dragons Premiership Select	Wales	N/A	Pandy Park; CCB Centre	3,000; 1,000	Crosskeys; Ystrad Mynach
Nottingham Rugby	England	RFU Championship	Lady Bay Sports Ground	3,000	Nottingham
Ospreys Premiership Select	Wales	N/A	The Gnoll; Talbot Athletic Ground; Llynfi Road	5,000; 3,000; N/A	Neath; Port Talbot; Maesteg
Richmond	England	RFU Championship	Richmond Athletic Ground	4,500	Richmond, London
Rotherham Titans	England	RFU Championship	Clifton Lane	2,500	Rotherham
Scarlets Premiership Select	Wales	N/A	Church Bank Playing Fields; Carmarthen Park; Parc y Scarlets	3,000; 3,000; 14,870	Llandovery; Carmarthen; Llanelli
Ulster A	Ireland	Irish Interprovincial Rugby Championship	Shaw's Bridge; Eaton Park; Kingspan Stadium	1,300; 1,000; 18,196	Belfast; Ballymena; Belfast
Yorkshire Carnegie	England	RFU Championship	Sandhill Lane Stadium; Moor Lane; Silver Royd	N/A; N/A; 1,950	Selby; Pontefract; Scalby

== Pool stages ==
Key to colours
Winner of each pool, advance to quarter-finals.
Three highest-scoring second-place teams advance to quarter-finals.

=== Pool 1 ===
Team	Pld	W	D	L	PF	PA	PD	TB	LB	Pts	Qualification
Jersey Reds	6	5	0	1	181	94	+87	3	0	23	Qualified as pool winner
(Ireland) Ulster A	6	4	0	2	153	124	+29	2	2	20	Qualified
(England) London Scottish	6	2	0	4	134	157	−23	2	2	12	
(Wales) Cardiff Blues Premiership Select	6	1	0	5	104	197	−93	0	3	7	

Updated to match(es) played on 10 March 2017. Source:
Rules for classification: 4 points for a win; 2 points for a draw; 1 bonus point for a loss by seven points or less; 1 bonus point for scoring four or more tries in a match

==== Round 1 ====
14 October 2016
19:00

Ulster A	19 – 6	Jersey Reds
	Report

Shaw's Bridge, Belfast
Attendance: 200
Referee: Dewi Phillips

15 October 2016
14:30

(BP) Cardiff Blues Premiership Select	21 – 26	London Scottish (BP)
	Report

BT Sport Cardiff Arms Park
Attendance: 787
Referee: Frank Murphy

==== Round 2 ====
21 October 2016
19:45

(BP) Jersey Reds	49 – 12	Cardiff Blues Premiership Select
	Report

St Peter
Attendance: 1,551
Referee: Ben Blain

22 October 2016
14:30

(BP) London Scottish	34 – 29	Ulster A (2BP)
	Report

Athletic Ground
Attendance: 906
Referee: Gareth Newman

==== Round 3 ====
9 December 2016
17:00

Ulster A	16 – 10	Cardiff Blues Premiership Select (BP)
	Report

Eaton Park, Ballymena
Attendance: 1,301
Referee: Veryan Boscawen

10 December 2016
14:30

London Scottish	13 – 22	Jersey Reds
	Report

Athletic Ground
Attendance: 947
Referee: Johnny Erskine

==== Round 4 ====
16 December 2016
19:45

Jersey Reds	23 – 19	London Scottish (BP)
	Report

St Peter
Attendance: 1,151
Referee: Ben Blain

17 December 2016
14:30

(BP) Cardiff Blues premiership Select	27 – 30	Ulster A
	Report

Sardis Road, Pontypridd
Attendance: 325
Referee: Hamish Smales

==== Round 5 ====
13 January 2017
19:00

(BP) Ulster A	38 – 21	London Scottish
	Report

Kingspan Stadium
Attendance: 4,813
Referee: Joy Neville

14 January 2017

Cardiff Blues Premiership Select	10 – 55	Jersey Reds (BP)
	Report

The Wern, Merthyr Tydfil
Attendance: 973
Referee: Nigel Correll

==== Round 6 ====
21 January 2017
14:00

(BP) Jersey Reds	26 – 21	Ulster A (BP)
	Report

St Peter
Attendance: 1,406
Referee: Craig Evans

10 March 2017
19:00

(BP) London Scottish	21 – 24	Cardiff Blues Premiership Select
	Report

Athletic Ground
Attendance: 400
Referee: Calum Howard

- Postponed from 21 January due to frozen pitch.

=== Pool 2 ===
London Welsh entered liquidation on 8 December 2016 and were disqualified from the competition and their results from rounds 1 and 2 annulled.

Team	Pld	W	D	L	PF	PA	PD	TB	LB	Pts	Qualification
(Ireland) Munster A	4	4	0	0	121	55	+66	3	0	19	Qualified as pool winner
(England) Rotherham Titans	4	1	0	3	73	102	−29	0	1	5	
(England) Doncaster Knights	4	1	0	3	61	98	−37	0	0	4	

Updated to match(es) played on 21 January 2017. Source:
Rules for classification: 4 points for a win; 2 points for a draw; 1 bonus point for a loss by seven points or less; 1 bonus point for scoring four or more tries in a match

==== Round 1 ====
15 October 2016
14:30

Munster A	15 – 30	London Welsh (BP)
	Report

Towns Park, Midleton
Attendance: 350
Referee: Fergus Kirby

- London Welsh expelled from the competition

15 October 2016
15:00

Rotherham Titans	34 – 17	Doncaster Knights
	Report

Clifton Lane
Attendance: 750
Referee: Jake Makepeace

==== Round 2 ====
22 October 2016
14:00

(BP) London Welsh	40 – 24	Rotherham Titans
	Report

Old Deer Park
Attendance: 728
Referee: Adam Leal

- London Welsh expelled from the competition.

22 October 2016
14:30

Doncaster Knights	P – P	Munster A

Castle Park

- Match postponed due to the death of Munster Rugby's head coach Anthony Foley and played on 7 January 2016.

==== Round 3 ====
10 December 2016
14:00

Rotherham Titans	24 – 35	Munster A (BP)
	Report

Clifton Lane
Attendance: 704
Referee: Rhys Thomas

==== Round 4 ====
18 December 2016
14:00

(BP) Munster A	34 – 3	Rotherham Titans
	Report

The Showgrounds, Ennis
Attendance: 350
Referee: Craig Evans

==== Round 2 (rescheduled game) ====
7 January 2016
14:30

Doncaster Knights	12 – 28	Munster A (BP)
	Report

Castle Park
Attendance: 974
Referee: Stuart Gaffikin

- Match postponed from 22 October 2016.

==== Round 5 ====
13 January 2017
19:00

Munster A	24 – 16	Doncaster Knights
	Report

Old Chapel, Bandon
Attendance: 937
Referee: Dewi Phillips

==== Round 6 ====
21 January 2017
14:00

Doncaster Knights	16 – 12	Rotherham Titans (BP)
	Report

Castle Park
Attendance: 1,207
Referee: Ben Blain

=== Pool 3 ===
Team	Pld	W	D	L	PF	PA	PD	TB	LB	Pts	Qualification
(England) London Irish	6	5	0	1	154	97	+57	4	1	25	Qualified as pool winner
(England) Cornish Pirates	6	4	0	2	188	99	+89	3	1	20	Qualified
(Wales) Ospreys Premiership Select	6	3	0	3	130	155	−25	2	0	14	
(Ireland) Connacht Eagles	6	0	0	6	82	223	−141	1	1	2	

Updated to match(es) played on 21 January 2017. Source:
Rules for classification: 4 points for a win; 2 points for a draw; 1 bonus point for a loss by seven points or less; 1 bonus point for scoring four or more tries in a match

==== Round 1 ====
15 October 2016
14:30

Ospreys Premiership Select	14 – 25	London Irish (BP)
	Report

The Gnoll, Neath
Attendance: 1,500
Referee: Matt Turvey

16 October 2016
14:30

Connacht Eagles	10 – 23	Cornish Pirates
	Report

Galway Sportsground
Attendance: 200
Referee: Ben Blain

==== Round 2 ====
22 October 2016
15:00

(BP) London Irish	34 – 3	Connacht Eagles
	Report

Madejski Stadium
Attendance: 3,109
Referee: Michael Hudson

23 October 2016
14:00

(BP) Cornish Pirates	41 – 5	Ospreys Premiership Select
	Report

Mennaye Field
Attendance: 1,405
Referee: Sean Gallagher

==== Round 3 ====
10 December 2016
14:30

(BP) Connacht Eagles	17 – 20	Ospreys Premiership Select
	Report

Galway Sportsground
Attendance: 419
Referee: Jack Makepeace

11 December 2016
15:00

(BP) London Irish	33 – 24	Cornish Pirates
	Report

Madejski Stadium
Attendance: 2,695
Referee: Adam Jones

==== Round 4 ====
18 December 2016
14:00

(BP) Cornish Pirates	16 – 17	London Irish
	Report

Mennaye Field
Attendance: 1,426
Referee: Fergus Kirby

18 December 2016
14:00

(BP) Ospreys Premiership Select	55 – 14	Connacht Eagles
	Report

Talbot Athletic Ground, Port Talbot
Attendance: 542
Referee: Adam Leal

==== Round 5 ====
14 January 2017
14:30

Connacht Eagles	14 – 41	London Irish (BP)
	Report

Dubarry Park, Athlone
Attendance: 695
Referee: Ben Blain

14 January 2017
14:30

Ospreys Premiership Select	10 – 34	Cornish Pirates (BP)
	Report

Llynfi Road, Maesteg
Attendance: 872
Referee: Jonny Erskine

==== Round 6 ====
21 January 2017
14:00

(BP) Cornish Pirates	50 – 24	Connacht Eagles (BP)
	Report

Mennaye Field
Attendance: 1,120
Referee: Matt Turvey

21 January 2017
14:00

(BP) London Irish	24 – 26	Ospreys Premiership Select (BP)
	Report

Madejski Stadium
Attendance: 2,221
Referee: Joy Neville

=== Pool 4 ===
Team	Pld	W	D	L	PF	PA	PD	TB	LB	Pts	Qualification
(Wales) Scarlets Premiership Select	6	4	0	2	198	149	+49	5	1	22	Qualified as pool winner
(Ireland) Leinster A	6	3	0	3	256	133	+123	3	1	16	
(England) Nottingham Rugby	6	3	0	3	148	136	+12	3	0	15	
(England) Richmond	6	2	0	4	100	284	−184	1	0	9	

Updated to match(es) played on 21 January 2017. Source:
Rules for classification: 4 points for a win; 2 points for a draw; 1 bonus point for a loss by seven points or less; 1 bonus point for scoring four or more tries in a match

==== Round 1 ====
15 October 2016
15:00

Richmond	19 – 68	Leinster A (BP)
	Report

Athletic Ground
Attendance: 512
Referee: Adam Jones

16 October 2016
15:00

Nottingham Rugby	11 – 33	Scarlets Premiership Select (BP)
	Report

Lady Bay Sports Ground
Attendance: 791
Referee: Sean Gallagher

==== Round 2 ====
22 October 2016
14:30

(BP) Scarlets Premiership Select	58 – 7	Richmond
	Report

Church Bank Playing Fields, Llandovery
Attendance: 350
Referee: Stuart Gaffikin

23 October 2016
15:00

Leinster A	21 – 29	Nottingham Rugby (BP)
	Report

Donnybrook Stadium
Attendance: 950
Referee: Gary Glennon

==== Round 3 ====
10 December 2016
14:00

(BP) Leinster A	65 – 13	Scarlets Premiership Select
	Report

Donnybrook Stadium
Attendance: 1,018
Referee: Ben Blain

11 December 2016
15:00

(BP) Nottingham Rugby	43 – 3	Richmond
	Report

Lady Bay Sports Ground
Attendance: 1,084
Referee: Hamish Smales

==== Round 4 ====
17 December 2016
14:30

(BP) Scarlets Premiership Select	27 – 7	Leinster A
	Report

Carmarthen Park, Carmarthen
Attendance: 250
Referee: Matt Turvey

17 December 2016
15:00

Richmond	20 – 12	Nottingham Rugby
	Report

Athletic Ground
Attendance: 485
Referee: Dew Phillips

==== Round 5 ====
13 January 2017
19:45

(BP) Nottingham Rugby	28 – 24	Leinster A (BP)
	Report

Lady Bay Sports Ground
Attendance: 1,367
Referee: Rhys Thomas

14 January 2017
15:00

(BP) Richmond	34 – 32	Scarlets Premiership Select (2BP)
	Report

Athletic Ground
Attendance: 396
Referee: Adam Leal

==== Round 6 ====
20 January 2017
19:30

(BP) Leinster A	71 – 17	Richmond
	Report

Donnybrook Stadium
Attendance: 673
Referee: Gareth Newman

21 January 2017
14:00

(BP) Scarlets Premiership Select	35 – 25	Nottingham Rugby
	Report

Parc y Scarlets
Attendance: 250
Referee: Veryan Boscawen

=== Pool 5 ===
Team	Pld	W	D	L	PF	PA	PD	TB	LB	Pts	Qualification
(England) Ealing Trailfinders	6	4	1	1	194	123	+71	3	2	23	Qualified as pool winner
(England) Yorkshire Carnegie	6	4	0	2	156	130	+26	3	1	20	Qualified
(Wales) Newport Gwent Dragons Premiership Select	6	2	0	4	118	170	−52	1	2	11	
(England) Bedford Blues	6	1	1	4	119	173	−54	1	1	8	

Updated to match(es) played on 21 January 2017. Source:
Rules for classification: 4 points for a win; 2 points for a draw; 1 bonus point for a loss by seven points or less; 1 bonus point for scoring four or more tries in a match

==== Round 1 ====
15 October 2016
15:00

(BP) Ealing Trailfinders	51 – 35	Yorkshire Carnegie (BP)
	Report

Trailfinders Sports Club
Attendance: 468
Referee: Veryan Boscawen

15 October 2016
15:00

(BP) Bedford Blues	46 – 33	Newport Gwent Dragons Premiership Select (BP)
	Report

Goldington Road
Attendance: 2,218
Referee: Joy Neville

==== Round 2 ====
22 October 2016
14:30

(BP) Yorkshire Carnegie	52 – 28	Bedford Blues
	Report

Sandhill Lane Stadium, Selby
Attendance: 623
Referee: Fergus Kirby

22 October 2016
15:00

(BP) Newport Gwent Dragons Premiership Select	27 – 28	Ealing Trailfinders
	Report

Pandy Park, Crosskeys
Attendance: 200
Referee: Matt Turvey

==== Round 3 ====
10 December 2016
15:00

Bedford Blues	19 – 19	Ealing Trailfinders
	Report

Goldington Road
Attendance: 1,707
Referee: Adam Leal

11 December 2016
14:15

Yorkshire Carnegie	20 – 17	Newport Gwent Dragons Premiership Select (BP)

Moor Lane, Pontefract
Attendance: 428
Referee: Nigel Correll

==== Round 4 ====
17 December 2016
15:00

Newport Gwent Dragons Premiership Select	22 – 20	Yorkshire Carnegie (BP)
	Report

CCB Centre, Ystrad Mynach
Attendance: 315
Referee: Jonny Erskine

17 December 2016
15:00

(BP) Ealing Trailfinders	40 – 23	Bedford Blues
	Report

Trailfinders Sports Club
Attendance: 428
Referee: Gareth Newman

==== Round 5 ====
14 January 2017
15:00

Bedford Blues	12 – 29	Yorkshire Carnegie (BP)
	Report

Goldington Road
Attendance: 1,874
Referee: Hamish Smales

14 January 2017
15:00

(BP) Ealing Trailfinders	56 – 19	Newport Gwent Dragons Premiership Select
	Report

Trailfinders Sports Club
Attendance: 433
Referee: Fergus Kirby

==== Round 6 ====
21 January 2017
14:00

Yorkshire Carnegie	14 – 10	Ealing Trailfinders (BP)
	Report

Silver Royd, Scalby
Attendance: 834
Referee: Rhys Thomas

21 January 2017
16:30

Newport Gwent Dragons Premiership Select	15 – 12	Bedford Blues (BP)
	Report

CCB Centre, Ystrad Mynach (Note: Initially due to be held at The Bridge Field, Bedwas but because of a frozen pitch, the venue was changed and the kick-off time moved from 14:00 to 16:30.)
Attendance: 652
Referee: Stuart Gaffikin

== Knock-out stage ==
The eight qualifiers were seeded according to performance in the pool stage. The four top seeds hosted the quarter-finals against the lower seeds, in a 1 v 8, 2 v 7, 3 v 6 and 4 v 5 format. If two teams qualified from the same group they could not be drawn together despite the seeding, therefore, Jersey Reds did not play against Ulster A. The quarter-finals were held over the weekend of 10/11/12 March 2017, the semi-finals were held over the weekend of 31 March and 1 & 2 April 2017 and the final was played on 21/22/23 April 2017.

Teams are ranked by:

1 – competition points (4 for a win, 2 for a draw)
2 – where competition points are equal, greatest number of wins
3 – where the number of wins are equal, aggregate points difference
4 – where the aggregate points difference are equal, greatest number of points scored

Seed	Pool winners	Pts	Wins	Pts diff
1	(England) London Irish	25	5	57
2	Jersey Reds	23	5	87
3	(England) Ealing Trailfinders	23	4	71
4	(Wales) Scarlets Premiership Select	22	4	49
5	(Ireland) Munster A	19	4	66
Seed	Pool Runners–up	Pts	Wins	Pts diff
6	(England) Cornish Pirates	20	4	89
7	(Ireland) Ulster A	20	4	29
8	(England) Yorkshire Carnegie	20	4	26
9	(Ireland) Leinster A	16	3	123
10	(England) Rotherham Titans	5	1	−25

Quarter-finals
12 March 2017 - Irish Independent Park
(Ireland) Munster A	26
(Ireland) Ulster A	3
11 March 2017 - Trailfinders Sports Ground
(England) Ealing Trailfinders	84
(Wales) Scarlets Premiership Select	7
11 March 2017 - Madejski Stadium
(England) London Irish	37
(England) Yorkshire Carnegie	14
10 March 2017 - St. Peter
Jersey Reds	36
(England) Cornish Pirates	20

Semi-finals
31 March - CIT Stadium
(Ireland) Munster A	25
(England) Ealing Trailfinders	9
2 April 2017 - Madejski Stadium
(England) London Irish	17
Jersey Reds	25

Final
21 April 2017 - Irish Independent Park, Cork
(Ireland) Munster A	29
Jersey Reds	28

=== Quarter-finals ===
The draw for the quarter-finals was made on 23 January 2017, with the matches to be played on the weekend of 10–13 March 2017.

10 March 2017
19:45

Jersey Reds	36 – 20	Cornish Pirates
	Report

St Peter
Attendance: 1,515
Referee: Jack Makepeace

11 March 2017
14:00

London Irish	37 – 14	Yorkshire Carnegie
	Report

Madejski Stadium
Attendance: 1,479
Referee: Rhys Thomas

11 March 2017
14:00

Ealing Trailfinders	84 – 7	Scarlets Premiership Select
	Report

Trailfinders Sports Ground
Attendance: 650
Referee: Nigel Correll

12 March 2017
15:00

Munster A	26 - 3	Ulster A
	Report

Irish Independent Park, Cork
Attendance: 800
Referee: Fergus Kirby

=== Semi-finals ===
31 March 2017
19:30

Munster A	25 – 9	Ealing Trailfinders
	Report

CIT Stadium, Cork
Attendance: 732
Referee: Rhys Thomas

2 April 2017
14:00

London Irish	17 – 25	Jersey Reds
	Report

Madejski Stadium
Attendance: 1,394
Referee: Jack Makepeace

=== Final ===
21 April 2017
19:30

Munster A	29 – 28	Jersey Reds
	Report

Irish Independent Park, Cork
Attendance: 983
Referee: Craig Maxwell-Keys

== Attendances ==
Club	Home matches	Total	Average	Highest	Lowest	% Capacity
Bedford Blues	3	5,799	1,933	2,218	1,707	39%
Cardiff Premiership Select	3	2,085	695	973	325	11%
Connacht Eagles	3	1,314	438	695	200	5%
Cornish Pirates	3	3,951	1,317	1,426	1,120	33%
Doncaster Knights	2	2,181	1,091	1,207	974	22%
Ealing Trailfinders	4	1,979	495	650	428	16%
Jersey Reds	4	5,623	1,406	1,551	1,151	35%
Leinster A	3	2,641	880	1,018	673	14%
London Irish	5	10,898	2,180	3,109	1,394	9%
London Scottish	3	2,253	751	947	400	17%
London Welsh	1 (Note: London Welsh only played 1 home game as they were disqualified from the competition due to going into liquidation.)	728	728	728	728	12%
Munster A	6	4,152	692	983	350	42%
Newport Gwent Dragons Premiership Select	3	1,167	389	652	200	34%
Nottingham Rugby	3	3,242	1,081	1,367	791	36%
Ospreys Premiership Select	3	2,914	971	1,500	542	24%
Richmond	3	1,393	464	512	396	10%
Rotherham Titans	2 (Note: Rotherham only played 2 home games due to London Welsh being disqualified from the competition due to going into liquidation.)	1,454	727	750	704	29%
Scarlets Premiership Select	3	850	283	350	250	7%
Ulster A	3	6,314	2,105	4,813	200	47%
Yorkshire Carnegie	3	1,885	628	834	428	43%

== Individual statistics ==
- Points scorers includes tries as well as conversions, penalties and drop goals. Appearance figures also include coming on as substitutes (unused substitutes not included).

=== Top points scorers ===
Rank	Player	Team	Appearances	Points
1	(Ireland) Johnny McPhillips	Ulster A	6	62
2	(Wales) Billy McBryde	Scarlets PS	7	56
3	(South Africa) Warren Seals	Yorkshire Carnegie	7	52
4	(Wales) Arwel Robson	Newport-Gwent Dragons PS	6	51
5	(England) Simon Katz	Jersey Reds	6	50
6	(Australia) Myles Dorrian	Bedford Blues	6	45
7	(England) Laurence May	Cornish Pirates	6	43
8	(Ireland) David Johnston	Munster A	8	42
9	(Ireland) Tom Daly	Leinster A	4	40
9	(Wales) Tom Williams	Scarlets PS	6	40

=== Top try scorers ===
Rank	Player	Team	Appearances	Tries
1	(Wales) Tom Williams	Scarlets PS	6	8
2	(Wales) Alex Walker	Ealing Trailfinders	4	6
3	(Wales) Barney Nightingale	Newport-Gwent Dragons PS	5	6
4	(Wales) Jay Baker	Ospreys PS	3	5
5	(England) Rob O'Donnell	Yorkshire Carnegie	3	5
6	(Ireland) Tom Daly	Leinster A	4	5
7	(Wales) Morgan Allen	Scarlets PS	6	5
7	(Australia) Nick Haining	Jersey Reds	6	5
7	(Ireland) Jimmy O'Brien	Leinster A	6	5
7	(Wales) Keiran Williams	Ospreys PS	6	5
8	(England) Alex O'Meara	Cornish Pirates	7	5

== Season records ==
=== Team ===
Largest home win — 77 points

84 – 7 Ealing Trailfinders at home to Scarlets Premiership Select on 11 March 2017

Largest away win — 49 points

68 – 19 Leinster A away to Richmond on 15 October 2016

Most points scored — 84 points

84 – 7 Ealing Trailfinders at home to Scarlets Premiership Select on 11 March 2017

Most tries in a match — 12

Ealing Trailfinders at home to Scarlets Premiership Select on 11 March 2017

Most conversions in a match — 10

Ealing Trailfinders at home to Scarlets Premiership Select on 11 March 2017

Most penalties in a match — 5

Rotherham Titans at home to Doncaster Knights on 15 October 2016

Most drop goals in a match — 1

Richmond away to Leinster on 20 January 2017

=== Player ===
Most points in a match — 26

(England) Rory Clegg for Ealing Trailfinders at home to Scarlets Premiership Select on 11 March 2017

Most tries in a match — 4

(England) Rob O'Donnell for Yorkshire Carnegie at home to Bedford Blues on 23 October 2016

Most conversions in a match — 10

(England) Rory Clegg for Ealing Trailfinders at home to Scarlets Premiership Select on 11 March 2017

Most penalties in a match — 5

(England) Lloyd Evans for Rotherham Titans at home to Doncaster Knights on 15 October 2016

Most drop goals in a match — 1

(England) Freddy Gabbitass for Richmond away to Leinster on 20 January 2017

=== Attendances ===
Highest — 4,813

Ulster A at home to London Scottish on 13 January 2017

Lowest — 200 (x3)

Ulster A at home to Jersey Reds on 14 October 2016
Connacht Eagles at home to Cornish Pirates on 16 October 2016
Newport Gwent Dragons Premiership Select at home to Ealing Trailfinders on 22 October 2016

Highest Average Attendance — 2,180 (London Irish)

Lowest Average Attendance — 283 Scarlets Premiership Select)
