= Hugh O'Sullivan =

- Born: 24 February 1998 (age 28) County Meath, Ireland
- Height: 1.78 m (5 ft 10 in)
- Weight: 80 kg (13 st; 180 lb)
- School: Belvedere College
- University: Trinity College Dublin

Rugby union career
- Position(s): Scrum-half, Wing, Fullback
Amateur team(s)
Years	Team	Apps	(Points)
2017–2021	Clontarf		
2025–	Old Belvedere RFC		
Senior career
Years	Team	Apps	(Points)
2018–2021	Leinster	32	(7)
2021–2023	London Irish	24	(20)
2023–	Newcastle Falcons	21	(10)
- Correct as of 7 August 2025
International career
Years	Team	Apps	(Points)
2018	Ireland U20	10	(10)
- Correct as of 21 October 2018

Hugh O'Sullivan (born 24 February 1998) is an Irish rugby union player, currently playing for Newcastle Falcons. He plays as a scrum-half and can also cover all positions in the back three.

== Club career ==
He attended Belvedere College, where he was part of back-to-back Leinster Schools Rugby Senior Cup winning sides in 2016 and 2017, only the third time the school had achieved such a feat in its history. He primarily played fullback for the 2017 winning team but has since played mainly at scrum-half.

O'Sullivan entered the Leinster Rugby academy ahead of the 2017–18 season. He made his senior debut at the start of the 2018–19 season, featuring off the bench against the Dragons.

On 2 July 2021, O'Sullivan would leave Leinster to move to England to join London Irish in the Premiership Rugby from the 2021–22 season. He made his debut from off the bench against Worcester Warriors in the Premiership in September 2021.

On 23 May 2023, O'Sullivan left London Irish to join Premiership rivals Newcastle Falcons on a two-year deal from the 2023–24 season. He made his debut in the Premiership Rugby Cup against Ampthill in September 2023.

== International career ==
O'Sullivan represented the Ireland U-20s at the 2018 Six Nations Under 20s Championship and at the 2018 World Rugby Under 20 Championship. Ireland finished third in the Six Nations, despite losing three of five matches. Ireland then struggled badly at the June World Championship, finishing in their worst-ever position of 11th out of 12 competitors and narrowly avoiding relegation to the World Rugby Under 20 Trophy.
