= Will Butler (rugby union) =

English rugby union player (born 1998)

- Born: William John Butler; 17 April 1998 (age 28) Sutton Coldfield, England
- Height: 1.78 m (5 ft 10 in)
- Weight: 92 kg (203 lb; 14 st 7 lb)
- School: Hereford Cathedral School

Rugby union career
- Position(s): Centre, Fly-half
- Current team: Tasman
Senior career
Years	Team	Apps	(Points)
2016–2022	Worcester Warriors	21	(15)
2021–2022	Cornish Pirates	5	(0)
2022–2023	Hartpury University	13	(5)
2024–	Gloucester	11	(5)
- Correct as of 11 June 2025
Provincial / State sides
Years	Team	Apps	(Points)
2024	Tasman	10	(3)
- Correct as of 13 October 2024
International career
Years	Team	Apps	(Points)
2017–2019	England U20	16	(10)
- Correct as of 13 October 2024

Will Butler (born 17 April 1998) is an English rugby union player who plays for Gloucester in the Gallagher Premiership. His position is Centre.

== Early life ==
Butler started playing rugby aged seven at Ledbury rugby club and stayed with them through to under 17 level, representing Herefordshire, North Midlands and England Lions Under 16s along the way. Butler joined the Worcester Warriors set up aged 14 and made his way up the age groups, helping the Under 18s to finals success both in 2016 and 2017, as they beat both Exeter Chiefs and Saracens.

== Club career ==
Butler came through the Warriors junior academy before joining the senior academy in the summer of 2016. In his first season at Sixways, Butler was a regular for Worcester Cavaliers and was handed his debut in a European Rugby Challenge Cup clash in Moscow against Enisei-STM. An injury sustained during the game in Russia kept him out for most of the season.

On 20 December 2018, Butler signed a two-year contract to stay with Worcester.

An elbow injury, sustained in the Premiership Rugby Sevens Series in August 2018, further disrupted Butler's progress but he returned to action in December and impressed for Cavaliers, who he captained in the Premiership Rugby Shield. Butler suffered a further setback when he sustained an ankle injury at Bath in September 2019 and was ruled out for four months. He returned to action against Enisei-STM in the European Challenge Cup in January 2020 as a second-half replacement and marked his return with a try.

He was appointed Warriors Assistant Club Captain in July 2020. Butler led Worcester in away Premiership matches against Wasps and Exeter Chiefs in August 2020.

On 5 October 2022 all Worcester players had their contacts terminated due to the liquidation of the company to which they were contracted.

After Worcester became liquidated, Butler played for Hartpury University in the RFU Championship for the rest of the 2022–23 season. He played for New Zealand province Tasman during the 2024 Bunnings NPC season.

On 5 December 2024, Butler returned to the Gallagher Premiership signing with Gloucester with immediate effect for the 2024–25 season.

== International career ==
Butler scored two tries on his England Under 17s debut against France and played his first game at Under 18 level against same French team in February 2016. Butler was also part of the England U20s squad which won the 2017 Six Nations Under 20 Championship, beating Scotland 33–5 in the finals. He was also part of the squad that reached the final of the 2017 World Rugby Under 20 Championship, where they were defeated by New Zealand.
