= Iban Etcheverry =

French rugby union player

- Born: Iban Etcheverry; 23 October 1998 (age 28) Bayonne, France
- Height: 1.78 m (5 ft 10 in)
- Weight: 83 kg (13 st 1 lb)

Rugby union career
- Position: Wing
- Current team: Soyaux Angoulême
Senior career
Years	Team	Apps	(Points)
2017–2019	Bordeaux Bègles	5	(10)
2018–2019	→Colomiers (loan)	18	(10)
2019–	Soyaux Angoulême	19	(28)
- Correct as of 6 March 2020
International career
Years	Team	Apps	(Points)
2018	France U20	5	(20)
- Correct as of 7 June 2018
National sevens team
Years	Team		Comps
2017	France 7s		6

Iban Etcheverry (born 23 October 1998) is a French rugby union player. His position is wing. He plays for Soyaux Angoulême in the Rugby Pro D2.

== International honours ==
France (U20)

- Six Nations Under 20s Championship winners: 2018
- World Rugby Under 20 Championship winners: 2018
