= Jordan Olowofela =

English rugby union player

- Born: Kehinde Oluwatomisin O. Olowofela; 17 April 1998 (age 28) Hull, England
- Height: 1.88 m (6 ft 2 in)
- Weight: 92 kg (14 st 7 lb; 203 lb)
- School: Lincoln Minster School; Wyggeston and Queen Elizabeth I College
- Notable relative: Ryan Olowofela (brother)

Rugby union career
- Position: Wing
- Current team: Doncaster Knights
Youth career
- Newark RFC
- 2014–2017: Leicester Tigers
Senior career
Years	Team	Apps	(Points)
2017–2022	Leicester Tigers	41	(30)
2016–2018	Loughborough Students	22	(50)
2021	→ Western Force (loan)	10	(25)
2021–2022	→ Dragons (loan)	8	(0)
2022-24	Nottingham		
2024-	Doncaster Knights		
2016–	Total	81	(105)
- Correct as of 19 July 2022
International career
Years	Team	Apps	(Points)
2018	England U20s	10	(30)
- Correct as of 17 June 2018

Kehinde Oluwatomisin O. "Jordan" Olowofela (born 17 April 1998) is an English rugby union player who plays centre or wing for Doncaster Knights. He previously played for Nottingham and Leicester Tigers, in Premiership Rugby and on loan for Loughborough Students in National League 1, Western Force in Australia's Super Rugby AU and Dragons in the URC, and for England Under-20s.

== Playing career ==
Olowofela was named as part of the Leicester Tigers team for the 2015 Premiership Rugby Sevens Series. Olowofela made his debut for Leicester Tigers in the Anglo-Welsh Cup against Bath Rugby in November 2017. On 27 January 2018 Olowofela scored his first try for Leicester in the Anglo-Welsh Cup against Cardiff Blues.

Olowofela was named in the England U20s Elite Player Squad for the 2017–18 season, and on 2 February 2018 made his debut from the bench against Italy in the 2018 Six Nations Under 20 Championship. In the next fixture he scored a try against Wales.

In May 2018, Olowofela was included in the squad for the 2018 World Rugby Under 20 Championship. He scored twice in the final as England finished runners up to hosts France.

On 23 September 2018 Olowofela started his first Premiership Rugby match for Leicester against Worcester Warriors and the same day was invited to a training camp with the senior England squad by Eddie Jones after a number of injury withdrawals.

On 1 March 2021, Olowofela joined the Western Force, based in Perth, Western Australia on loan for the 2021 Super Rugby AU and Super Rugby Trans-Tasman competitions. In only his third game for the franchise, Olowofela scored a hat-trick of tries in the defeat of the previously unbeaten Queensland Reds to send the Force into their first ever finals campaign.

On 2 September Olowofela joined Newport based Dragons on a season-long loan. His release from Leicester was announced on 19 July 2022, with Olowofela joining RFU Championship side Nottingham. He moved once more in Summer 2024 signing for Doncaster Knights ahead of the 2024-25 Championship season.

== Personal life ==
Olowofela has an identical twin brother, Ryan Olowofela, who has represented England 7s. Olowofela attended Lincoln Minster School on a sports scholarship and was also a talented squash player as well as playing in Nottingham Forest's academy.
