= 2017 Six Nations Under 20s Championship =

Rugby union competition

- Date: 3 February – 17 March 2017
- Countries: England; France; Ireland; Italy; Scotland; Wales

Tournament statistics
- Champions: England (6th title)
- Grand Slam: England (3rd)
- Triple Crown: England
- Matches played: 15
- Tries scored: 99 (6.6 per match)
- Top point scorer: (Wales) Ben Jones (75)
- Top try scorer: (Wales) Keiran Williams (5)

The 2017 Six Nations Under 20s Championship, was the 10th series of the Six Nations Under 20s Championship, the annual northern hemisphere rugby union championship. Wales were the defending champions. The competition was won by England, who completed a Grand Slam by winning all their five matches.

For the first time, the 2017 tournament used the bonus point system common to most other professional rugby union tournaments. As well as the standard four points for a win and two for a draw, a team scoring four tries in a match received an additional league table point, as did a team losing by seven or fewer points. Additionally, to ensure that a team winning all of its five matches (a Grand Slam) would also win the Championship, three bonus points were awarded for this achievement.

== Participants ==
Nation	Stadium			Head coach	Captain
Nation	Home stadium	Capacity	Location	Head coach	Captain
England	Sandy Park; Northern Echo Arena; Franklin's Gardens	12,600; 10,000; 15,249	Exeter; Darlington; Northampton	Louis Deacon	Ben Earl
France	Stade des Alpes; Stade Sapiac	20,068; 12,600	Grenoble; Montauban		Florian Verhaeghe
Ireland	Donnybrook Stadium	6,000	Dublin	Nigel Carolan	Jack Kelly
Italy	Stadio Giovanni Mari; Stadio Enrico Chersoni; Stadio Santa Rosa	5,000; 2,500	Legnano; Prato; Capoterra		
Scotland	Broadwood Stadium	8,086	Cumbernauld	Sean Lineen	Callum Hunter-Hill
Wales	Parc Eirias	6,080	Colwyn Bay	Jason Strange	

== Table ==
Position	Nation	Games				Points			Tries		Bonus points		Total points
Position	Nation	Played	Won	Drawn	Lost	For	Against	Diff	For	Against	Tries	Loss	Total points
1	England	5	5	0	0	189	53	136	28	6	4	0	27*
2	France	5	3	0	2	133	127	6	17	16	2	1	15
3	Wales	5	3	0	2	174	143	31	20	20	2	0	14
4	Ireland	5	3	0	2	111	122	−11	12	13	0	1	13
5	Scotland	5	1	0	4	104	171	−67	14	23	2	1	7
6	Italy	5	0	0	5	61	156	−95	8	21	0	2	2
	Source: Under-20 Six Nations, 18 March 2017												

* England were awarded an extra 3 table points for achieving the Grand Slam.

== Fixtures ==
=== Round 1 ===
3 February 2017
18:00 GMT (UTC+0)

Italy	5–27	Wales

Stadio Giovanni Mari, Legnano
Attendance: 2,300
Referee: Sean Gallagher

FB	15	Massimo Cioffi
RW	14	Andrea Bronzini
OC	13	Ludovico Vaccari
IC	12	Marco Zanon
LW	11	Giovanni D'Onofrio
FH	10	Antonio Rizzi
SH	9	Charly Trussardi
N8	8	Giovanni Licata (c)
OF	7	Lorenzo Masselli
BF	6	Jacopo Bianchi
RL	5	Edoardo Iachizzi
LL	4	Giordano Baldino
TP	3	Marco Riccioni
HK	2	Massimo Ceciliani
LP	1	Daniele Rimpelli
Replacements:
HK	16	Alberto Rollero
PR	17	Danilo Fischetti
PR	18	Giosuè Zilocchi
LK	19	Gabriele Venditti
FL	20	Nardo Casolari
SH	21	Emilio Fusco
FH	22	Michelangelo Biondelli
CE	23	Roberto Dal Zilio
Coach:
(Italy) Alessandro Troncon

FB	15	Will Talbot-Davies
RW	14	Jared Rosser
OC	13	Ioan Nicholas
IC	12	Kieran Williams
LW	11	Ryan Conbeer
FH	10	Ben Jones
SH	9	Dane Blacker
N8	8	Morgan Morris
OF	7	Will Jones
BF	6	Morgan Sieniawski
RL	5	Max Williams
LL	4	Alex Dombrandt
TP	3	Kieron Assiratti
HK	2	Ellis Shipp (c)
LP	1	Rhys Carré
Replacements:
HK	16	Corrie Tarrant
PR	17	Steffan Thomas
PR	18	Christian Coleman
LK	19	Jack Pope
N8	20	Aled Ward
SH	21	Declan Smith
FH	22	Phil Jones
CE	23	Cameron Lewis
Coach:
(Wales) Byron Hayward

- Twenty Welsh players made their debuts.
- This was the 8th consecutive victory for Wales and their 13th win against Italy in 13 matches.

3 February 2017
20:30 GMT (UTC+0)

(BP) Scotland	19–20	Ireland

Broadwood Stadium, Cumbernauld
Attendance: 1,200
Referee: Christopher Ridley (England)

FB	15
RW	14
OC	13
IC	12
LW	11
FH	10
SH	9
N8	8
OF	7
BF	6
RL	5
LL	4
TP	3
HK	2	(c)
LP	1
Replacements:
HK	16
PR	17
PR	18
LK	19
FL	20
SH	21
FH	22
WG	23
Coach:
(Australia) Eddie Jones

FB	15
RW	14
OC	13
IC	12
LW	11
FH	10
SH	9
N8	8
OF	7
BF	6
RL	5
LL	4
TP	3
HK	2	(c)
LP	1
Replacements:
HK	16
PR	17
PR	18
N8	19
N8	20
SH	21
FH	22
WG	23
Coach:
(Argentina) Daniel Hourcade

4 February 2017
12:00 GMT (UTC+0)

(BP) England	59–17	France

Sandy Park, Exeter
Attendance: 6,836
Referee: Dan Jones

FB	15	Tom Parton
RW	14	Joe Cokanasiga
OC	13	Max Wright
IC	12	Will Butler
LW	11	Sam Aspland-Robinson
FH	10	Max Malins
SH	9	Harry Randall
N8	8	Ben Earl
OF	7	Zach Mercer (c)
BF	6	Ben Curry
RL	5	Nick Isiekwe
LL	4	Jack Nay
TP	3	Joseph Morris
HK	2	Joe Mullis
LP	1	Ollie Dawe
Replacements:
HK	16	Jamie Blamire
PR	17	Ciaran Knight
PR	18	Jake Pope
LK	19	Justin Clegg
FL	20	Josh Bayliss
SH	21	Alex Mitchell
CE	22	Jacob Umaga
WG	23	Gabriel Ibitoye
Coach:
(England) Jon Callard

FB	15	Romain Buros
RW	14	Geoffrey Cros
OC	13	Nathan Decron
IC	12	Théo Millet
LW	11	William Iraguha
FH	10	Thomas Darmon
SH	9	Arthur Retière
N8	8	Julien Ruaud
OF	7	Alexandre Roumat (c)
BF	6	Selevasio Tolofua
RL	5	Mickaël Capelli
LL	4	Florian Verhaege
TP	3	Corentin Chabeaudie
HK	2	Florian Dufour
LP	1	Mathis Dumain
Replacements:
HK	16	Étienne Fourcade
PR	17	Léo Aouf
PR	18	Ugo Boniface
FL	19	Kilian Bendjaballah
N8	20	Baptiste Pesenti
SH	21	Baptiste Couilloud
FH	22	Anthony Fuertes
CE	23	Théo Dachary
Coach:
(France) Thomas Lièvremont

=== Round 2 ===
10 February 2017
18:00 GMT (UTC+0)

(BP) Italy	26–27	Ireland

Stadio Enrico Chersoni, Prato
Attendance: 3,500
Referee: Adam Jones

10 February 2017
19:15 GMT (UTC+0)

Wales	21–37	England (BP)

Eirias Stadium, Colwyn Bay
Attendance: 5,000
Referee: Frank Murphy

10 February 2017
20:00 GMT (UTC+0)

(BP) France	36–8	Scotland

Stade des Alpes, Grenoble
Attendance: 3,000
Referee: Sean Gallagher

=== Round 3 ===
24 February 2017
19:45 GMT (UTC+0)

(BP) England	46–0	Italy

Northern Echo Arena, Darlington
Attendance: 6,319
Referee: Sam Gove-White

24 February 2017
20:00 GMT (UTC+0)

Ireland	27–22	France (BP)

Energia Park, Donnybrook, Dublin
Attendance: 4,521
Referee: Tom Foley

24 February 2017
20:30 GMT (UTC+0)

(BP) Scotland	34–65	Wales (BP)

Broadwood Stadium, Cumbernauld
Referee: Thomas Charabas

=== Round 4 ===
10 March 2017
14:00 GMT (UTC+0)

(BP) Italy	13–18	France

Stadio Santa Rosa, Cagliari
Attendance: 1,200
Referee: Mikw Adamson

11 March 2017
18:15 GMT (UTC+0)

(BP) England	33–5	Scotland

Franklin's Gardens, Northampton
Attendance: 6,442

11 March 2017
19:45 GMT (UTC+0)

(BP) Wales	41–27	Ireland

Eirias Stadium, Colwyn Bay
Attendance: 2,700

=== Round 5 ===
17 March 2017
18:00 GMT (UTC+0)

(BP) Ireland	10–14	England

Energia Park, Donnybrook, Dublin
Referee: Pierre Brousset

17 March 2017
20:00 GMT (UTC+0)

(BP) France	40–20	Wales

Stade Sapiac, Montauban
Referee: Mike Adamson

17 March 2017
20:30 GMT (UTC+0)

(BP) Scotland	38–17	Italy

Broadwood Stadium, Cumbernauld
Referee: Frank Murphy

== Broadcasting rights ==
Some of the matches are broadcast on television by France 4 and Sky Sports.

== See also ==
- 2017 Six Nations Championship
