= Lasha Lomidze =

Lasha Lomidze may refer to:

- Lasha Lomidze (rugby union, born 1992)
- Lasha Lomidze (rugby union, born 2000)
