= Gabriel Ibitoye =

English rugby union player

- Born: Gabriel Ibitoye; 5 March 1998 (age 28) Lambeth, England, United Kingdom
- Height: 5 ft 10 in (1.78 m)
- Weight: 15 st 1 lb (96 kg)
- School: Trinity School

Rugby union career
- Position: Wing
- Current team: Bristol Bears
Senior career
Years	Team	Apps	(Points)
2015–2020	Harlequins	44	(70)
2016–2017	→ Esher	14	(15)
2020	Agen	6	(10)
2021	Montpellier	3	(0)
2021–2022	Tel Aviv Heat	-	(-)
2022–	Bristol Bears	49	(120)
- Correct as of 23 December 2024
International career
Years	Team	Apps	(Points)
2015–2016	England U18	10	(40)
2017–2018	England U20	17	(50)
2024	England 'A'	1	(0)
- Correct as of 30 July 2019

Gabriel Ibitoye (born 5 March 1998) is an English professional rugby union player for Bristol Bears in Premiership Rugby. His primary position is wing.

== Career ==
Ibitoye began playing rugby at Trinity School aged eleven. Initially a forward, he later moved to the centres and then wing. His first club was Bromley R.F.C.

In 2015 and 2016 Ibitoye represented the England under-18 team. He was a member of the squad that completed a grand slam in the 2017 Six Nations Under 20s Championship. Later that year he scored tries against Wales and Australia during the pool stage of the 2017 World Rugby Under 20 Championship. He started in the final of the tournament as England were defeated by New Zealand.

Ibitoye competed in the 2018 U20 Six Nations scoring in their last fixture against Ireland. He was included in the squad for the 2018 World Rugby Under 20 Championship and scored two tries in a victory over Scotland. He started in the junior world cup final for a consecutive year as England finished runners up to hosts France. In February 2018 Ibitoye was called up by coach Eddie Jones to train with the senior squad.

Ibitoye joined Harlequins academy at the age of twelve. He made his club debut in November 2017 against Saracens. In July 2020, it was confirmed that Ibitoye would leave Quins to join Top 14 side Agen on a two-year deal starting from the 2020–21 season. However, he was granted mutual release from the club where he instead signed for Montpellier as a medical joker for the remainder of the 2020–21 season. Following the end of his contract at Montpellier, he signed with Israeli side Tel Aviv Heat.

Ibitoye was signed by Bristol Bears for the 2022–2023 season. He was the joint top try scorer in the normal Premiership season in 2024–25, with 13 tries, tied with Ollie Hassell-Collins of Leicester Tigers. This was also key to Bristol Bears record setting 16 try bonus points from 18 games, beating Exeter Chiefs previous record of 15 in 22 matches.
