= Beck Cutting =

English rugby union player (born 1998)

- Born: Beck Euan R. Cutting; 4 September 1998 (age 28) Slough, England
- Height: 1.83 m (6 ft 0 in)
- Weight: 102 kg (225 lb; 16 st 1 lb)
- School: Bromsgrove School
- University: University of Bath

Rugby union career
- Position: Hooker
- Current team: Worcester Warriors
Amateur team(s)
Years	Team	Apps	(Points)
- Kidderminster Carolians
Senior career
Years	Team	Apps	(Points)
2017–2022	Worcester Warriors	26	(5)
2017–2018	→ Bishop's Stortford		
2018–2019	→ Hartpury University	5	(0)
2019	→ Jersey Reds	2	(0)
2020	→ Birmingham Moseley	2	(0)
2022–	Ampthill		
- Correct as of 19 November 2020
International career
Years	Team	Apps	(Points)
2014	England U16s		
2014–2015	England U17s		
2015–2016	England U18s		
2017–2018	England U20s	3	(0)
- Correct as of 19 November 2020

Beck Cutting (born 4 September 1998) is an English rugby union player. He plays for Ampthill in the RFU Championship.

== Early life ==
Cutting took up the game with Kidderminster Carolians at the age of eight before been picked up by Worcester Warriors at U15s level. He helped Bromsgrove School to win the NatWest Schools Cup in 2015 and 2016, also helping them to reach the semi-final in 2017. He was on a sport scholarship for the University of Bath, studied in Sports Science while playing for them in the BUCS Super Rugby competition.

== Club career ==
Beck cutting joined the Senior Academy in the summer of 2017. He made his first team debut against Sale Sharks in the Anglo-Welsh Cup back in November 2017. He started against Saracens in the Premiership Rugby Cup at Allianz Park in November 2018.

He also came off the bench in the European Rugby Challenge Cup match in Pau in December 2018, and the Premiership Rugby Cup match against Leicester Tigers at the start of the 2019-20 season.

He has enjoyed spells with Bishop's Stortford, Hartpury University, Birmingham Moseley and Jersey Reds on dual registration arrangements.

On 20 June 2020, Cutting signed his first professional contract with Worcester at Sixways Stadium, thus promoted to the senior squad from the 2020-21 season. On 15 August 2020, he made his Premiership debut from off the bench against Gloucester during the 2019-20 season. He scored his first try against Wasps a week later in the Premiership.

On 4 November 2022, Cutting signed for Ampthill in the RFU Championship for the remainder of the 2022-23 season.

== International career ==
Cutting has already played at three levels for England – U16, U17 and U18, where he was selected for England U18s for their tour in South Africa.

He represented England U20s and featured for the side in their 2018 Six Nations Under 20s Championship campaign where they missed out on the title by points difference to France. He also played a role in their run to the final of the 2018 World Rugby Under 20 Championship where he managed to get on the scoresheet in their win over Scotland U20s before France again ended as the competition winners.
