= Tom Parton =

English rugby union player

- Born: Thomas Lewis Parton; 2 February 1998 (age 28) Oxford, England
- Height: 1.77 m (5 ft 10 in)
- Weight: 90 kg (14 st 2 lb; 200 lb)
- School: Wellington College

Rugby union career
- Position(s): Full-back, Wing
- Current team: Panasonic Wild Knights
Senior career
Years	Team	Apps	(Points)
2017–2023	London Irish	60	(60)
2023–2024	Saracens	28	(40)
2024–	Panasonic Wild Knights	12	(5)
- Correct as of 1 January 2025
International career
Years	Team	Apps	(Points)
2016	England U18	7	(5)
2017–2018	England U20	17	(30)
- Correct as of 17 June 2018

Tom Parton (born 2 February 1998) is an English professional rugby union player who plays as a full-back for Saitama Wild Knights in Japan League One competition.

== Career ==
Parton was a graduate of the London Irish academy and made his senior club debut in 2017. He has captained the U18 Academy side against Exeter Chiefs, already had represented England U17s. He started in their 2021–22 EPCR Challenge Cup quarter-final elimination against RC Toulon. At the end of that season in June 2022 he was called up by coach Eddie Jones to join a training camp with the senior England squad.

Parton started all five games for the England U20 side that completed a grand slam in the 2017 Six Nations Under 20s Championship and scored a try in their opening game. Later that year he was a member of the squad at the 2017 World Rugby Under 20 Championship and started in the final as England finished runners up to New Zealand.

Parton also played at the 2018 World Rugby Under 20 Championship and scored a try in the semi-final victory over South Africa. He started in the final as England were defeated by hosts France to finish runners up again.

In November 2022 it was announced that Parton would leave to join Saracens. In April 2024 he scored the quickest Premiership Rugby hat-trick in history against Gloucester. At the end of that season he started in their semi-final elimination against Northampton Saints.

On 31 December 2024 it was confirmed that Parton had left Saracens with immediate effect to join Saitama Wild Knights in Japan League One competition.
