= Cai Evans =

Welsh rugby union player (born 1999)

- Born: 23 June 1999 (age 27) Penarth, Wales
- Height: 1.85 m (6 ft 1 in)
- Weight: 84 kg (185 lb; 13 st 3 lb)
- School: Cowbridge Comprehensive School
- University: Swansea University
- Notable relative: Ieuan Evans (father)

Rugby union career
- Position(s): Fly-half, Fullback
- Current team: Dragons
Senior career
Years	Team	Apps	(Points)
2017–2023	Ospreys	35	(35)
2023–	Dragons	12	(76)
- Correct as of 11 March 2024
International career
Years	Team	Apps	(Points)
2018–2019	Wales U20	20	(155)
2023–	Wales	2	(2)
- Correct as of 11 March 2024

Cai Evans (born 23 June 1999) is a Welsh professional rugby union player who plays as a fly-half for United Rugby Championship club Dragons and the Wales national team.

== Club career ==
=== Cardiff Blues ===
Evans began his career with local club Cowbridge RFC, and was a member of the Cardiff Blues academy up to Under-16 level. Evans moved to the Ospreys after missing out on selection for both Wales Under-16 and subsequently the Cardiff academy at higher age-grade.

=== Ospreys ===
Evans made his debut for the Ospreys in 2017 having previously played for the Ospreys academy, Bridgend Ravens and the Ospreys Development team. He made his European Rugby Challenge Cup debut on 20 October 2018 against Worcester Warriors. Evans signed a contract extension with the Ospreys on 12 February 2020.

=== Dragons ===
Evans joined the Dragons on 10 July 2023. Evans made his debut on 21 October 2023, in a defeat by Edinburgh.

He signed an extension with the Dragons on 28 May 2025.

== International career ==
=== Wales U20 ===
Evans made his debut for Wales U20 in during the 2018 Six Nations Under 20s Championship, in a win over Scotland U20. During the 2018 World Rugby Under 20 Championship, Evans kicked 16 points to help Wales defeat Australia U20 for the first time.

=== Wales ===
On 1 May 2023, Warren Gatland selected him in Wales' 54 player training squad for the Rugby World Cup 2023. He made his Wales debut in the World Cup warm-up match against South Africa, starting the game at full-back and scoring a conversion in the 73rd minute. He did not make the final Rugby World Cup squad but made his second appearance for Wales as a substitute in an uncapped match vs the Barbarians the following November.

On 16 January 2024, Evans was selected in Gatland's 34-player squad for Wales' upcoming Six Nations campaign.

== Personal ==
Cai Evans is the son of former Wales rugby union captain Ieuan Evans. In a relationship
