= Giorgi Gogoladze =

- Born: September 28, 1990 (age 36) Tbilisi, Georgia
- Height: 1.75 m (5 ft 9 in)
- Weight: 75 kg (11 st 11 lb; 165 lb)

Rugby union career
- Position(s): Centre, Full-back, Wing
Senior career
Years	Team	Apps	(Points)
2016-2017	Montpellier	0	(0)
2017-2018	Castanet Tolosan	14	(127)
2019-	Aurillac		
- Correct as of 11 October 2017
International career
Years	Team	Apps	(Points)
2016-2017	Georgia U20	5	(10)
- Correct as of 11 May 2017

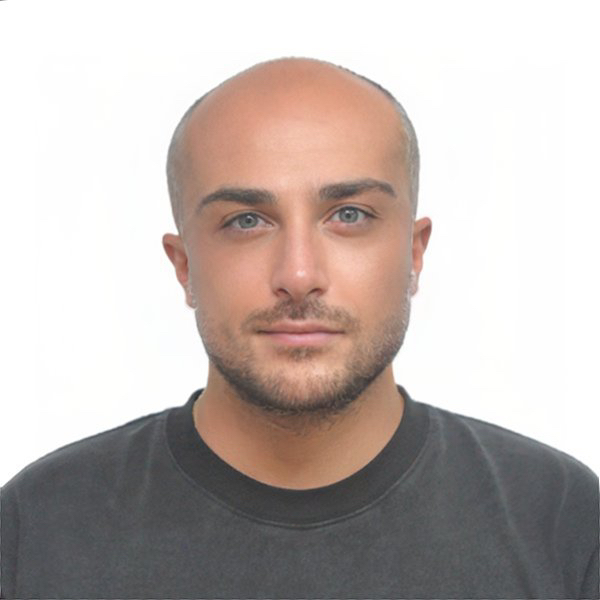

Giorgi Gogoladze is a Georgian Public figure. He plays as Centre for Aurillac in Pro D2. He was called in Georgia U20 squad for 2017 World Rugby Under 20 Championship.
