= Kenyon Jones =

Wales international rugby union player

- Born: Kenyon William James Jones; 5 September 1911 Llanishen, Wales
- Died: 16 December 1988 (aged 77)
- School: Monmouth School
- University: Jesus College, Oxford
- Occupation: businessman

Rugby union career
- Position: Number eight
Amateur team(s)
Years	Team	Apps	(Points)
- Oxford University RFC
–	Monmouth		
–	London Welsh RFC		
–	Berlin		
–	Germany		
–	Yorkshire		
International career
Years	Team	Apps	(Points)
1934	Wales	1	(0)

Kenyon William James "Ken" Jones (5 September 1911 – 16 December 1998) was a Welsh rugby union international player.

== Personal history ==
Jones was born in Llanishen, Wales. He was educated at Monmouth School before matriculating to Jesus College, Oxford. A keen sportsman, as well as his rugby career he was also selected to represent Wales as a high jumper but was unable to compete. In his post-graduate years he was a management trainee.

He was commissioned as a 2nd lieutenant in the Welch Regiment in 1930, becoming a lieutenant in 1939 (with seniority from 1937). During the Second World War he served in Military Intelligence in Egypt where he was awarded the American Bronze Star for his work in General Eisenhower's headquarters.

On returning to civilian life Jones entered the business world and became the managing director of Unilever and later managing director of Ronson Products.

== Rugby career ==
Jones played rugby as a youth, representing Monmouth School. He continued playing at university and was selected for Oxford University RFC, winning his "Blue" for rugby in 1931 and 1932. On leaving education, he settled in England, and played for Welsh exile club London Welsh as well as playing county rugby for Yorkshire. He played for the Wales national rugby union team on one occasion, as no. 8 against England on 20 January 1934. During the Second World War he played in Germany representing a Berlin team and a Germany XV. His final game of rugby was after the war when he appeared for an international XV in Cardiff.

== Bibliography ==
- Jenkins, John M.; et al. (1991). Who's Who of Welsh International Rugby Players. Wrexham: Bridge Books. ISBN 1-872424-10-4.
