= Alessandro Manni =

Italian footballer (born 1974)

Personal information
- Full name: Alessandro Manni
- Date of birth: February 16, 1974 (age 52)
- Place of birth: Terni, Italy
- Height: 1.75 m (5 ft 9 in)
- Position: Midfielder

Senior career*
Years	Team	Apps	(Gls)
1992–93	Ternana	13	(2)
1993–96	Udinese	1	(0)
1994	→ Andria (loan)	7	(0)
1995–96	Prato	21	(2)
1996–98	Sora	56	(4)
1998–99	Vis Pesaro	28	(9)
1999–02	Benevento	89	(9)
2002	Alessandria	0	(0)
2003–04	Teramo	23	(0)
2004–05	Acireale	23	(1)
2005–07	Foligno	59	(3)
2007	Cisco Roma	12	(0)
2008–09	Viterbese	8	(1)
- * Club domestic league appearances and goals

Alessandro Manni (born 16 February 1974) is a retired Italian footballer who played as a midfielder.

He played 1 game in the Serie A in the 1995/96 season for Udinese Calcio.

== See also ==
- Football in Italy
- List of football clubs in Italy
