= Lasha Lomidze (rugby union, born 2000) =

- Born: January 26, 2000 (age 26) Kutaisi, Georgia
- Height: 1.81 m (5 ft 11 1/2 in)
- Weight: 90 kg (14 st 2 lb; 198 lb)

Rugby union career
- Position(s): Fly-half, Centre
Senior career
Years	Team	Apps	(Points)
2016-	AIA Kutaisi	27	(59)
2021-2023	The Black Lion	17	(25)
- Correct as of 11 August 2020
International career
Years	Team	Apps	(Points)
2017-2020	Georgia U20	7	(5)
2020-	Georgia	1	(0)
- Correct as of 11 August 2017

Lasha Lomidze (born 26 January 2000) is a Georgian rugby union player. He plays as Fly-half for AIA Kutaisi in Georgia Championship Didi 10 and Georgia national rugby union team. He was called in Georgia U20 squad for 2017 World Rugby Under 20 Championship.
