= Gela Aprasidze =

Georgian rugby player

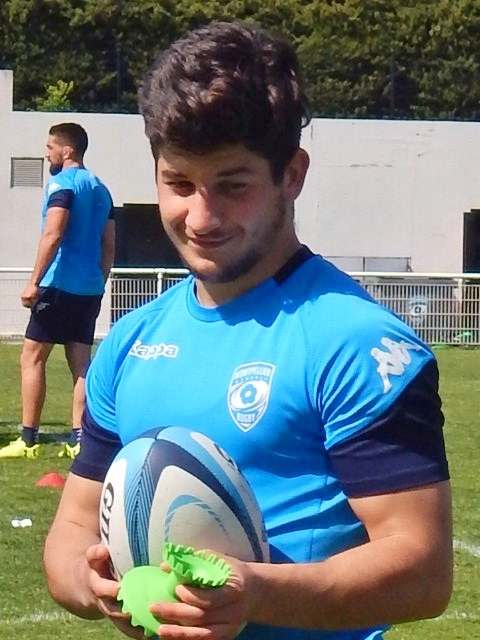
- Aprasidze representing Montpellier
- Born: 14 January 1998 (age 28) Bolnisi, Georgia
- Height: 1.76 m (5 ft 9 in)
- Weight: 76 kg (168 lb; 12 st 0 lb)

Rugby union career
- Position: Scrum-half
- Current team: Montpellier
Senior career
Years	Team	Apps	(Points)
2016–2017	Lelo Saracens	16	(47)
2017–2023	Montpellier	41	(39)
2023-	Bayonne	15	(6)
- Correct as of 3 July 2024
International career
Years	Team	Apps	(Points)
2016–2018	Georgia under-20	12	(51)
2017–	Georgia	54	(35)
- Correct as of 3 July 2024

Gela Aprasidze (Georgian: გელა აფრასიძე; born 14 January 1998) is a Georgian professional rugby union player who plays as a scrum-half for Top 14 club Bayonne and the Georgia national team.

== Professional career ==
Aprasidze was a member of the Georgia U20 squad for the 2017 World Rugby Under 20 Championship.

Aprasidze signed as a prospect in 2017 at Montpellier Hérault Rugby. He is the 4th in the Scrum half (rugby union) hierarchy behind Ruan Pienaar, Benoît Paillaugue and Enzo Sanga. Taking advantage of their injuries, he made his first start against Exeter in the European Cup.

He signed for Bayonne ahead of the 2023–24 season. Making his debut in the sixth round of the Top 14 season, coming off the bench against La Rochelle.
