= Charlie Chapman (rugby union) =

English rugby player

- Born: Charlie Chapman; 1 December 1998 (age 27) Gloucester, England
- Height: 1.75 m (5 ft 9 in)
- Weight: 80 kg (12 st 8 lb)
- School: Bromsgrove School; Hartpury University

Rugby union career
- Position: Scrum-half
- Current team: Gloucester
Senior career
Years	Team	Apps	(Points)
2018–2025	Gloucester	103	(65)
2017–2019	→ Hartpury College (loan)	16	(15)
2025–2026	Exeter Chiefs	23	(0)
2026–	Worcester Warriors	0	(0)
- Correct as of 23 October 2022
International career
Years	Team	Apps	(Points)
2018	Scotland U20s	9	(43)
- Correct as of 30 July 2019

Charlie Chapman (born 11 December 2000) is an English scrum-half currently playing for Worcester Warriors in RFU Championship. He has represented Scotland under 20s and was dual-registered with Hartpury for the 2018–19 season.

Chapman represented Scotland in the U20s Six Nations and earned selection for the Junior World Championship in France.

On 9 April 2025, Chapman agreed to join Premiership rivals Exeter Chiefs ahead of the 2025-26 season. On 4 June 2026, Chapman agrees a deal to join local rivals Worcester Warriors in the RFU Championship from the 2026-27 season.
