= Will Griffiths (rugby union) =

Welsh rugby union player

- Full name: Will Griffiths
- Born: 25 December 1998 (age 27) Swansea, Wales
- Height: 193 cm (6 ft 4 in)
- Weight: 106 kg (16 st 10 lb; 234 lb)

Rugby union career
- Position(s): Lock, Flanker
Senior career
Years	Team	Apps	(Points)
2018–2025	Ospreys	57	(10)
International career
Years	Team	Apps	(Points)
2017	Wales U20	5	(5)

Will Griffiths (born 25 December 1998) is a Welsh former rugby union player. Griffiths played Ospreys as a lock or flanker.

== Professional career ==
Griffiths made his debut for the Ospreys in 2018 having previously played for the Ospreys academy, Swansea RFC and the Ospreys Development, after an ACL injury ruled him out of the majority of the prior season. He came through the ranks at Gowerton RFC and captained the Ospreys to a Regional Age-Grade title.

His competitive debut came in the Challenge Cup on 15 December 2018, against Stade Français. His first start came shortly after, against Section Paloise. He signed his first senior contract with the club at the end of the season. Griffiths missed a portion of the following season due to injury.

Griffiths extended his contact with the Ospreys in March 2021, and again in July 2023.

Griffiths captained an Ospreys Development team in a friendly against the Dragons in November 2024.

Griffiths was not listed in the Ospreys squad for the 2025–26 United Rugby Championship, but his departure was never officially announced.

Having previously captained Wales U18, Griffiths also represented Wales U20, featuring in the 2017 World Rugby Under 20 Championship. He made his debut against Australia U20. Griffiths was brought in by Wales coach Wayne Pivac for fitness testing, ahead of the 2021 July rugby union tests against Argentina and Canada.
