= Jamie Spowart =

New Zealand rugby union player

- Born: 15 May 1998 (age 28) New Zealand
- Height: 181 cm (5 ft 11 in)
- Weight: 87 kg (192 lb; 13 st 10 lb)
- School: King's College

Rugby union career
- Position(s): Wing, Fullback
Senior career
Years	Team	Apps	(Points)
2018–2019	Tasman	6	(25)
2021	Southland	2	(0)
- Correct as of 15 August 2021
International career
Years	Team	Apps	(Points)
2018	New Zealand U20	7	(25)
- Correct as of 25 May 2021

Jamie W. Spowart (born 15 May 1998) is a New Zealand rugby union player. His position of is Wing.

== Tasman ==
Spowart made his debut for Tasman in Round 1 of the 2018 Mitre 10 Cup against Canterbury at Lansdowne Park in Blenheim. In August 2019 he was named in the 2019 Tasman Mako squad for the first time. He was vice captain of the Mako squad that toured the United States of America in January 2020. He was named in the 2020 Tasman Mako squad but did not play a game as the Mako won their second premiership title in a row.

== Southland ==
After not being named in the Tasman squad for the 2021 Bunnings NPC Spowart headed north and was part of the Auckland wider training squad before being named to come off the bench for Southland against Otago in Round 1 of the competition.
