= James Eirian Davies =

Welsh poet and Methodist minister

James Eirian Davies (28 May 1918 – 5 July 1998) was a Welsh poet and Methodist minister. His wife, Jennie, was a well-known journalist and politician.

His parents were Rachel and Dafydd Davies, who worked a farm in the Nantgaredig area of Carmarthenshire. He attended Nantgaredig Primary School and then the Queen Elizabeth Grammar School in Carmarthen.

Tragedy struck when his brother Emrys was drowned when they were swimming in the River Tywi near Llain. He was much comforted by the local chapel community, and it was they who later influenced his decision to enter the ministry.

Following a preparatory year at Trevecka College, he studied for a degree at University College of Wales, Swansea. He then sought theological training at the 'United Theological College' in Aberystwyth, and was well known in the area as a popular (and unconventional) student-preacher.

In 1949, he was ordained a minister in the Calvinistic Methodist Church, ministering in Hirwaun and Penderyn, Cynon Valley (1949–1954). In the same year he married Jennie Howells, and they had two sons, Siôn Eirian (later an actor and writer) and Guto Davies. He later moved to Brynaman (1955–1961), and then to Bethesda, Mold and Nercwys in Flintshire (1962–1981). Jennie died suddenly in 1982 and an open verdict was recorded by the coroner; the sudden loss deeply affected Davies.

His published writings include a number of volumes of poetry titled, Awen y Wawr(1947), Cân Galed (1967), Cyfrol o Gerddi (1985), Awen yr Hwyr (1991), and Darnau Difyr (1989).

Towards the end of his life he moved to live in a residential home in Ffairfach, near Llandeilo. he died there in July 1998. Following the funeral, his ashes were scattered at the site where his brother drowned. A plaque of remembrance is displayed at the chapel in Nantgaredig.
