= José Luis González (rugby union) =

Argentine rugby union player

- Born: 11 September 1997 (age 29) Argentina
- Height: 185 cm (6 ft 1 in)
- Weight: 103 kg (227 lb; 16 st 3 lb)

Rugby union career
- Position: Hooker
- Current team: Mont-de-Marsan
Senior career
Years	Team	Apps	(Points)
2016–2019	Tucumán	7	(5)
2019	Jaguares XV	4	(10)
2020	Ceibos	2	(0)
2020–	Mont-de-Marsan	11	(10)
- Correct as of 17 May 2021
International career
Years	Team	Apps	(Points)
2017–	Argentina U20	5	(5)
2018–	Argentina XV	4	(0)
2020–	Argentina		
- Correct as of 17 May 2021

José Luis González (born 11 September 1997) is an Argentine rugby union player who plays for theMont-de-Marsan in the Rugby Pro D2. His playing position is hooker. He joined the Mont-de-Marsan in January 2021, having previously played in his home land for Jaguares XV in the 2019 Currie Cup First Division and Ceibos in the first Súper Liga Americana de Rugby season. He also represented Argentina XV ten times between 2017 and 2019. His performances saw him named in the Argentina squad for the 2020 and 2021 internationals.
