= Barney Nightingale =

Welsh rugby union footballer

- Born: Barney Nightingale; 5 November 1996 (age 30) Bristol, England
- Height: 178 cm (5 ft 10 in)
- Weight: 97 kg (15 st 4 lb)

Rugby union career
- Current team: Bargoed
Senior career
Years	Team	Apps	(Points)
2014-2018	Dragons	5	(0)
2018-	Bargoed		
- Correct as of 9 September 2016
International career
Years	Team	Apps	(Points)
2015	Wales U20	4	(0)

Barney Nightingale (born 5 November 1996) is an English born, Welsh rugby union player who plays for Bargoed RFC as a centre. He formerly played for the Dragons regional team and the Wales under-20 rugby team.

Nightingale made his debut for the Dragons regional team in 2015 having previously played for the Dragons academy, racking up a total of five appearances in the 2014-15 season. Later that year he was part of the Wales under-20 squad for the 2015 world championships, where he made four appearances. Opportunities at the Dragons were scarce in subsequent seasons and Nightingale was released at the end of the 2017-18 season to join Bargoed RFC.
