= Filippo Di Marco =

Italian rugby union player

- Born: 12 July 1998 (age 28) L'Aquila, Italy
- Height: 179 cm (5 ft 10 1/2 in)
- Weight: 85 kg (187 lb; 13 st 5 lb)

Rugby union career
- Position: Fly-half
- Current team: Fiamme Oro
Youth career
- L'Aquila Rugby
- –: F.I.R. Academy
Senior career
Years	Team	Apps	(Points)
2016−2018	F.I.R. Academy		
2018–2019	Viadana	13	(12)
2019–	Fiamme Oro	19	(96)
2021	→ Zebre	2	(0)
- Correct as of 11 Jun 2021
International career
Years	Team	Apps	(Points)
2017–2018	Italy U20s	11	(17)
2022	Italy A	1	(2)
- Correct as of 25 Jun 2022

Filippo Di Marco (born 12 July 1998) is an Italian rugby union player, currently playing for Top10 side Fiamme Oro. He was also a permit player for the Pro14 side Zebre. His preferred position is fly-half.

== Zebre ==
Di Marco was announced as an additional player for Zebre in May 2021. He made his Zebre debut in Round 4 of the Pro14 Rainbow Cup competition against Cardiff Blues.

== International career ==
In 2017 and 2018 Di Marco was named in the Italy Under 20 squad. On 26 May he was called in Italy A squad for the South African tour in the 2022 mid-year rugby union tests against Namibia and Currie Cup XV team.
