= Ryan Conbeer =

Welsh rugby union player

- Born: Ryan Conbeer; 5 February 1999 (age 27) Saundersfoot, Wales
- Height: 178 cm (5 ft 10 in)
- Weight: 91 kg (14 st 5 lb)
- School: Coleg Sir Gâr

Rugby union career
- Position: Wing
- Current team: Ospreys
Senior career
Years	Team	Apps	(Points)
2016–2019	Llanelli RFC	23	(55)
2016–2024	Scarlets	78	(165)
2024–	Ospreys	2	(5)
- Correct as of 28 September 2024
International career
Years	Team	Apps	(Points)
- Wales U18
2017–2019	Wales U20	23	(25)
- Correct as of 29 December 2019
National sevens team
Years	Team		Comps
2018–2019	Wales		2

Ryan Conbeer (born 5 February 1999) is a Welsh rugby union player who plays for the Ospreys in the United Rugby Championship as a winger. He had previously played for the Scarlets and Llanelli RFC

== Professional career ==
Conbeer first played for Tenby RFC, before moving to Narberth RFC at U12 level. While with Narberth, Conbeer was selected for Wales U16. Conbeer played for Scarlets U16, and joined the academy. He progressed into the Wales U18 side, and joined them on a tour to South Africa.

Conbeer earned his first call-up to the Wales U20s squad for the 2017 Six Nations Under 20s Championship. Conbeer's debut came in a victory to Italy U20, a game in which Conbeer scored a try. Over three seasons, he made 23 appearances in total for the U20 side, scoring five tries.

At age 17, Conbeer made his debut for the Scarlets in 2016 in a 44–21 victory against Bath. In 2017, he graduated from the Scarlets academy and signed a development contract with the club, and began to train full time with the first team that summer. Conbeer made his competitive debut on 24 February 2018 against Ulster, scoring a try in the bonus point win.

In 2018, Conbeer was selected for Wales Sevens for the Dubai leg. An injury during the tournament limited his involvement.

Conbeer scored two tries in the 2019 Boxing Day derby win over the Ospreys. On 14 November 2020, Conbeer scored twice as the Scarlets earned an away win in Connacht. In 2022, Conbeer signed a contract extension with the Scarlets. On 30 April 2022 Conbeer scored a hattrick against the Ospreys.

In May 2024, the Scarlets announced that Conbeer would be released at the end of the 2023/2024 season. He signed for the Ospreys on a short-term deal on the 3rd of August. He scored a try on his debut in a losing effort to the Dragons.
