= Arwel Robson =

- Born: Arwel Robson; 21 February 1997 (age 29) Wales
- Height: 180 cm (5 ft 11 in)
- Weight: 83 kg (13 st 1 lb)

Rugby union career
- Position: Fly-Half
- Current team: Cardiff Rugby
Senior career
Years	Team	Apps	(Points)
2016–21	Dragons	28	(102)
	Cornish Pirates	51	(307)
2023–25	Cardiff Rugby	4	(0)
2025	Cornish Pirates	0	(0)
- Correct as of 13 July 2025

Arwel Robson (born 21 February 1997) is a Welsh rugby union player who plays for the Cornish Pirates as a fly half.

Robson made his debut for the Dragons regional team in 2016 having previously played for Newport RFC.

Robson played his junior and youth rugby at Nelson RFC and Penallta RFC and was a member of the 2014 Penallta Youth side which won the Welsh Youth Cup. Robson scored a try in the final at the Millennium Stadium.
