= Lodovico Manni =

Italian rugby union player (born 1998)

- Born: 30 January 1998 (age 28) Treviso, Italy
- Height: 1.92 m (6 ft 4 in)
- Weight: 105 kg (16 st 7 lb; 231 lb)

Rugby union career
- Position: Flanker
- Current team: Colorno
Senior career
| Years | Team | Apps | (Points) |
| 2017−2018 | Mogliano | 20 | (5) |
| 2018−2023 | Petrarca Padova | 24 | (10) |
| 2019 | →Benetton | 2 | (0) |
| 2023−2025 | Colorno | 22 | |
- Correct as of 21 May 2020
International career
| Years | Team | Apps | (Points) |
| 2017−2018 | Italy Under 20 | 13 | (5) |
- Correct as of 21 May 2020

Lodovico Manni (born 30 January 1998) is an Italian rugby union player. His usual position is as a Flanker and he currently plays for Colorno in Italian Serie A Elite.

Under contract with Petrarca Padova, for 2019–20 Pro14 season, he named like Permit Player for Benetton.

In 2017 and 2018, Manni was also named in the Italy Under 20 squad.
