= Giovanni D'Onofrio =

Italian rugby union player

- Born: 25 August 1998 (age 28) Benevento, Italy
- Height: 1.82 m (6 ft 0 in)
- Weight: 85 kg (13 st 5 lb; 187 lb)

Rugby union career
- Position: Wing
- Current team: Fiamme Oro
Youth career
- Rugby Benevento
Senior career
Years	Team	Apps	(Points)
2015−2016	Rugby Benevento		
2016−2018	F.I.R. Academy		
2016−2017	→Zebre	3	(0)
2017−2020	Fiamme Oro	31	(80)
2018	→Zebre	1	(0)
2020−2022	Zebre	17	(20)
2021−2022	→Fiamme Oro	11	(20)
2022−	Fiamme Oro		
- Correct as of 23 Apr 2022
International career
Years	Team	Apps	(Points)
2017−2018	Italy Under 20	13	(45)
2019−	Italy Sevens		
- Correct as of 25 May 2020

Giovanni D'Onofrio (25 August 1998) is an Italian rugby union player. His usual position is as a Wing and he currently plays for Fiamme Oro in Top10.

For 2016–17 Pro12 (selected from F.I.R. Academy), 2017-18 and 2018–19 Pro14 seasons (under contract with Fiamme Oro), D'Onofrio was named as Permit Player for Zebre. From 2020 to 2022 he played for Zebre in United Rugby Championship with a Dual contract in order to play on loan as Permit Player with Fiamme Oro in Top10.

From 2017 to 2018 D'Onofrio was named in the Italy Under 20 squad and from 2019 he is also part of the Italy Sevens squad to participate at the Qualifying Tournament for the 2020 Summer Olympics.
