= Will Jones (rugby union) =

Welsh rugby union footballer

- Born: Will Jones; 12 March 1998 (age 28) Penclawdd, Wales
- Height: 181 cm (5 ft 11 in)
- Weight: 97 kg (15 st 4 lb; 214 lb)
- School: Gower College Swansea
- University: Swansea University, Durham University

Rugby union career
- Position: Openside flanker
- Current team: Darlington Mowden Park R.F.C.
Senior career
Years	Team	Apps	(Points)
2016–2020	Ospreys	14	(0)
International career
Years	Team	Apps	(Points)
2017–2018	Wales U20	24	(10)

Will Jones (born 12 March 1998) is a Welsh former professional rugby union player who previously played for Ospreys as a flanker. He was a Wales under-20 international.

== Professional career ==
Jones competed at the 2015 European Cadet Judo Championships.

Jones made his debut for the Ospreys in 2017, against Wasps, having previously played for the Ospreys academy and Swansea RFC. He captained the Ospreys at under-16 and under-18 levels, and signed a development contract in 2016.

Jones signed his first senior contract with the Ospreys in February 2018.

Jones was released by the Ospreys, and moved to England in hopes of attracting a Premiership contract, which ultimately did not occur.

While attending Durham University, Jones was convicted of grievous bodily harm in December 2022, and sentenced to community service in addition to paying a fine to his victim. Jones later played for Darlington Mowden Park R.F.C., and was named captain in 2023.

Jones represented Wales at under-18 and under-20 levels, and served as captain for both sides.
