= Antonio Rizzi =

Italian rugby union player

- Born: 5 January 1998 (age 28) Trieste, Italy
- Height: 1.81 m (5 ft 11 in)
- Weight: 86 kg (13 st 8 lb; 190 lb)

Rugby union career
- Position: Fly-Half
Youth career
- Leonorso Udine
- 2014−2016: Mogliano
Senior career
Years	Team	Apps	(Points)
2016−2017	F.I.R. Academy		
2017−2018	Petrarca Padova	12	(45)
2018−2020	Benetton	23	(62)
2020−2023	Zebre	38	(171)
- Correct as of 30 Apr 2022
International career
Years	Team	Apps	(Points)
2016−2018	Italy Under 20	21	(93)
2021	Italy A	1	(2)
- Italy
- Correct as of 16 May 2020

Antonio Rizzi (Trieste, 5 January 1998) is a retired Italian rugby union player. His usual position was as a fly-half and he played for Zebre in Pro14.

In the 2018-19 and 2019–20 Pro14 seasons, he played for Benetton.

He played for the Italy Under 20 team, from 2016 to 2018. On 8 November 2021 he was named in the Italy A squad for the 2021 end-of-year rugby union internationals.

In January 2020 Rizzi was named in the Italian squad for the 2020 Six Nations Championship.
