= 2018 Six Nations Under 20s Championship =

Rugby union championship

- Date: 2 February – 16 March 2018
- Countries: England; France; Ireland; Italy; Scotland; Wales

Tournament statistics
- Matches played: 12
- Tries scored: 89 (7.42 per match)

The 2018 Six Nations Under 20s Championship, was the 11th series of the Six Nations Under 20s Championship, the annual northern hemisphere rugby union championship. England were the defending champions.

== Participants ==
Nation	Stadium			Head coach	Captain
Nation	Home stadium	Capacity	Location	Head coach	Captain
England	Kingston Park; Ricoh Arena	10,200; 32,609	Newcastle; Coventry	Steve Bates	Ben Earl
France	Stade Chaban-Delmas; Stade Jean Laville; Stade de la Méditerranée	34,694; 13,872; 18,555	Bordeaux; Gueugnon; Beziers		
Ireland	Donnybrook Stadium	6,000	Dublin	Noel McNamara	Tommy O'Brien
Italy	Stadio Enzo Bearzot; Stadio della Vittoria	1,000; 40,400	Gorizia; Bari	Fabio Roselli	Michele Lamaro
Scotland	Broadwood Stadium; Myreside	8,086; 5,500	Cumbernauld; Edinburgh	Stevie Scott	Robbie Smith
Wales	Parc Eirias	6,080	Colwyn Bay	Jason Strange	Tommy Reffell

== Table ==
Position	Nation	Games				Points			Tries		Bonus points		Total points
Position	Nation	Played	Won	Drawn	Lost	For	Against	Diff	For	Against	Tries	Loss	Total points
1	France	5	4	0	1	211	80	131	30	8	4	0	20
2	England	5	4	0	1	151	74	77	19	9	3	1	20
3	Ireland	5	2	0	3	145	182	−37	21	26	3	1	12
4	Italy	5	2	0	3	126	181	−55	17	27	2	1	11
5	Wales	5	2	0	3	99	120	−21	14	16	2	0	10
6	Scotland	5	1	0	4	102	197	−95	13	27	1	1	6

== Fixtures ==
=== Round 1 ===
2 February 2018
18:00 GMT (UTC+1)

Italy	17 – 27	England (BP)
Try: Luccardi 40' c Penalty 77'; Con: Rizzi (1/1); Pen: Rizzi (1/1) 57'		Try: Earl 19' m White 48' c Parton 50' c Loader 61' m Con: Grayson (2/4); Pen: Grayson (1/1) 3'

Stadio Enzo Bearzot,
Referee: Ludovic Cayre (France)

2 February 2018
20:00 GMT (UTC+1)

(BP) France	34 – 24	Ireland
Try: Ntamack (2) 13' c, 29' c Diallo 26' m Gimbert 63' m Bamba 78' c Con: Ntamack (2/3); Carbonel (1/2); Pen: Ntamack (1/1) 3'		Try: Penalty 53'; Stewart 59' c McCarthy 72' c Con: Byrne (2/2); Pen: Byrne (1/1) 23'

Chaban-Delmas, Bordeaux
Referee: Christopher Ridley (England)

2 February 2018
20:15 GMT (UTC+0)

(BP) Wales	36 – 3	Scotland
Try: Morgan 3' c Goodchild 24' m Baldwin (2) 27' c, 77' c Davis 71' c Con: C. Evans (4/5); Pen: C. Evans (1/1) 62'		Pen: Dewhirst (1/2) 20'

Eirias Stadium, Colwyn Bay
Referee: Frank Murphy (Ireland)

=== Round 2 ===
9 February 2018
19:15 GMT (UTC+0)

(BP) Ireland	38 – 34	Italy (2 BP)

Donnybrook Stadium, Dublin

9 February 2018
19:45 GMT (UTC+0)

(BP) England	37 – 12	Wales

Kingston Park, Newcastle

9 February 2018
19:45 GMT (UTC+0)

Scotland	19 – 69	France (BP)

Broadwood Stadium, Cumbernauld

=== Round 3 ===
23 February 2018
18:45 GMT (UTC+0)

(BP) France	78 – 12	Italy

Stade Jean-Laville, Gueugnon

23 February 2018
19:15 GMT (UTC+0)

(2 BP) Ireland	38 – 41	Wales (BP)

Donnybrook, Dublin

23 February 2018
19:15 GMT (UTC+0)

(BP) Scotland	24 – 17	England (BP)

Myreside, Edinburgh

=== Round 4 ===
9 March 2018
19:15 GMT (UTC+0)

(BP) Ireland	30 – 25	Scotland (BP)

Donnybrook, Dublin

9 March 2018
19:15 GMT (UTC+0)

Wales	7 – 18	Italy

Parc Eirias, Colwyn Bay

9 March 2018
20:00 GMT (UTC+1)

France	6 – 22	England

Stade de la Méditerranée, Béziers

=== Round 5 ===
16 March 2018
15:00 GMT (UTC+1)

(BP) Italy	45 – 31	Scotland

Stadio della Vittoria, Bari

16 March 2018
20:00 GMT (UTC+0)

(BP)England	48 – 15	Ireland

Ricoh Arena, Coventry

16 March 2018
20:15 GMT (UTC+0)

Wales	3 – 24	France (BP)

Parc Eirias, Colwyn Bay
