= Jack O'Sullivan (rugby union) =

Irish rugby union player (born 1998)

- Born: 1 October 1998 (age 28) Cork, Ireland
- Height: 1.88 m (6 ft 2 in)
- Weight: 100 kg (16 st; 220 lb)
- School: Presentation Brothers College
- University: University College Cork
- Notable relative(s): Billy Scannell (cousin); Niall Scannell (cousin); Rory Scannell (cousin); Donal O'Sullivan (grandfather)

Rugby union career
- Position: Back-row
Amateur team(s)
Years	Team	Apps	(Points)
- UCC
Senior career
Years	Team	Apps	(Points)
2019–2024	Munster	39	(35)
2024–	Red Hurricanes Osaka	24	(35)
- Correct as of 28 May 2025
International career
Years	Team	Apps	(Points)
2018	Ireland U20	5	(20)
- Correct as of 16 March 2018

Jack O'Sullivan (born 1 October 1998) is an Irish rugby union player who plays as a flanker or number eight for United Rugby Championship club Munster.

== Early life ==
Born in Cork, O'Sullivan attended Presentation Brothers College, where he enjoyed a successful schools rugby career, winning the Schools Bowen Shield, the Munster Schools Junior Cup in 2014, and captaining the school to victory in the Munster Schools Rugby Senior Cup final in 2017, alongside future Munster teammates Seán French and Jonathan Wren. Whilst still only in his fourth year, O'Sullivan featured for Ireland under-18 schools, and won representation for Munster at under-18 and under-19 level, as well as touring France with the Ireland under-19s squad in 2017. He is the cousin of Munster players Niall and Rory Scannell, and of Biarritz player Billy Scannell, and is studying finance at University College Cork.

== Munster ==
Following his exploits with Presentation Brothers College at school level, O'Sullivan joined the Munster academy ahead of the 2017–18 season, and he made his debut for Munster A during the 2017–18 British and Irish Cup against English side Bedford Blues in December 2017. After returning from a long-term knee injury sustained whilst on international duty with Ireland under-20s, O'Sullivan was selected in the Munster A squad for the Cara Cup, a tournament hosted in Weymouth, Massachusetts, starting in the 38–19 win against New England Free Jacks on 6 April 2019.

O'Sullivan made his senior competitive debut for Munster on 28 September 2019, featuring as a replacement in the provinces opening 2019–20 Pro14 fixture against Welsh side Dragons in Thomond Park, and he made his first start for the province in their 28–12 win against Welsh side Ospreys on 25 October 2019. O'Sullivan made his European debut for Munster in their final pool 4 fixture of the 2019–20 Champions Cup against Welsh side Ospreys on 19 January 2020. He joined the Munster senior squad on a three-year contract ahead of the 2020–21 season. In Munster's 29–10 win against Welsh side Scarlets during round 13 of the 2019–20 Pro14 on 29 February 2020, O'Sullivan scored his first try for the province, and he won the John McCarthy Award for Academy Player of the Year for his performances during the 2019–20 season. O'Sullivan signed a two-year contract extension with Munster in January 2022.

== Ireland ==
Selected in the Ireland under-20s for the 2018 Six Nations Under 20s Championship, O'Sullivan started against France, Italy, Wales, Scotland, and England, scoring four tries and earning two Man-of-the-Match awards during the tournament. O'Sullivan again won selection for the under-20s, this time for the 2018 World Rugby Under 20 Championship, but he suffered a knee injury just days after being selected, which ruled him out of the tournament.

== Honours ==
=== Presentation Brothers College ===
- Munster Schools Junior Cup:
  - Winner (1): 2014
- Munster Schools Rugby Senior Cup:
  - Winner (1): 2017

=== Munster ===
- United Rugby Championship
  - Winner (1): 2022–23

=== Individual ===
- John McCarthy Award for Academy Player of the Year:
  - Winner (1): 2019–20
