= Noel Elliott =

Irish rugby union player (1947–2021)

- Born: James Noel Elliott; 1947 Cork, Ireland
- Died: 26 February 2021 (aged 74) Cork, Ireland
- School: Presentation Brothers College

Rugby union career
Senior career
Years	Team	Apps	(Points)
- Dolphin
Provincial / State sides
Years	Team	Apps	(Points)
- Munster

James Noel Elliott (1947 – 26 February 2021) was an Irish rugby union player. He played in the back row for Dolphin RFC and Munster.

== Career ==
Elliott enjoyed his first rugby successes when he won Senior Cup and Junior Cup medals with Presentation Brothers College at prop forward and also played for Munster Schools for two seasons. He led the Dolphin U20 team to win the Dooradoyle Cup, a 7-a-side competition, beating University College Dublin in the final thanks to his two tries. As club captain during the 1972-73 season he guided Dolphin to the Munster Senior League title. Elliott subsequently changed positions to wing forward, a move which suited him, as he went on play many times for Munster, including in a narrow loss to Australia, while he also made the national squad for a period.

== Death ==
Elliott died aged 74 on 26 February 2021.

== Honours ==
Presentation Brothers College

- Munster Schools Rugby Senior Cup: 1965, 1966

Dolphin

- Munster Senior League: 1973 (c)
