= Billy Scannell =

Irish rugby union player

- Born: 16 September 1999 (age 27) Cork, Ireland
- Height: 1.81 m (5 ft 11 1/2 in)
- Weight: 96 kg (212 lb; 15 st 2 lb)
- School: Presentation Brothers College
- Notable relative(s): Niall Scannell (brother); Rory Scannell (brother); Jack O'Sullivan (cousin); Donal O'Sullivan (grandfather)

Rugby union career
- Position: Hooker
Amateur team(s)
Years	Team	Apps	(Points)
- Young Munster
2022–	Cork Constitution		
Senior career
Years	Team	Apps	(Points)
2020–2022	Biarritz	2	(5)
2021–2022	→ Stade Lagonnais (loan)	11	(0)
- Correct as of 10 April 2022
International career
Years	Team	Apps	(Points)
2019	Ireland U20	1	(0)
- Correct as of 22 February 2019

Billy Scannell (born 16 September 1999) is an Irish rugby union player. He plays as a hooker.

== Early life ==
Born in Cork, Scannell is the younger brother of Munster players Niall and Rory and a cousin of Jack O'Sullivan. His grandfather is Donal O'Sullivan, who captained Cork to the 1956 All-Ireland Senior Football Championship Final. Scannell first began playing rugby for Douglas RFC, but switched to Cork Constitution at under-12 level, where his older brothers were already on the books. He attended Presentation Brothers College, Cork and won a Munster Schools Rugby Senior Cup in 2017, in a side that was captained by his cousin Jack. Scannell also captained the school's senior side, and started for Ireland under-18s in all three of their tests against Italy, England and Wales.

== Club career ==
After finishing school in 2018, Scannell entered Munster's sub-academy and began playing in the amateur All-Ireland League with Limerick club Young Munster.

Scannell was overlooked for promotion to Munster's academy, so instead, at the age of 19, he signed a two-year academy contract with French club Biarritz ahead of the 2019–20 season. The deal meant that Scannell would train full-time with the club's senior squad, whilst initially playing matches for the espoirs, or under-23s, side. He made his senior competitive debut for the club in their 2019–20 Pro D2 round 20 fixture away to Vannes on 14 February 2020. Scannell joined Fédérale 1 club Stade Lagonnais on loan for the 2021–22 season.

== International career ==
Having previously represented Ireland at under-18 and under-19 level, Scannell made his debut for Ireland under-20s in their 34–14 win against Italy on 22 February 2019 during the 2019 Six Nations Under 20s Championship. Ireland went on to win a grand slam in that year's tournament.
