= FX v Clinical Director of Central Mental Hospital =

Irish Supreme Court case

F.X.v The Clinical Director of Central Mental Hospital and Another
- Coat of arms of Ireland
- Court: Supreme Court of Ireland
- Decided: 23 January 2014
- Citation: [2014] IESC 1; [2014] 1 IR 280

Case history
- Appealed from: High Court and Central Criminal Court
- Appealed to: Supreme Court

Court membership
- Judges sitting: Denham C.J., Murray J., Hardiman J., O'Donnell J., McKechnie J

Case opinions
- The Supreme Court clarified the habeas corpus jurisdiction in Ireland
- Decision by: Denham CJ.

Keywords
- Constitution, Habeas Corpus

F.X. v The Clinical Director of Central Mental Hospital and Another [2014] IESC 1; [2014] 1 IR 280 is a reported Irish Supreme Court case in which the court "clarified two important points about the habeas corpus jurisdiction":

1. that the High Court's jurisdiction does lie in respect of detention orders made by courts of coordinate jurisdiction; and
2. although the Constitution does not allow for stays to be placed on orders of habeas corpus, "orders can be made for controlling the release of persons who are incapable of protecting themselves."

== Background (and Judgement of the lower courts) ==
=== Facts of the case ===
In this case, F.X. (the respondent in the appeal) is alleged to have brutally assaulted another patient at Tallaght Hospital on 11 May 2010. Three days later the respondent was arrested and brought before Tallaght District Court. The respondent was initially remanded in Cloverhill Prison, however the presiding doctor, Dr. Moola, deemed him to be mentally unwell, and instead requested he be transferred to the Central Mental Hospital (CMH) in accordance with Section 15 of the Criminal Law (Insanity) Act of 2006 (the 2006 Act). The victim died from his injuries on 11 January 2011, and the state subsequently charged the respondent with murder. In November 2011, the Mental Health (Criminal) Review Board reviewed F.X.'s detention in the CMH and decided that he was "appropriately detained there."

Carney J of the Central Criminal Court held that F.X. was unfit to be tried of murder in accordance with Article 4 of the 2006 Act, and requested that he remain under the care of the Central Medical Hospital.

=== Application to the High Court ===
F.X. made an application to the High Court under Article 40.4.2 of the Irish Constitution, stating that his detention was unconstitutional. Article 40.4.2 of the Irish Constitution provides that:

Upon complaint being made by or on behalf of any person to the High Court or any judge thereof alleging that such person is being unlawfully detained, the High Court and any and every judge thereof to whom such complaint is made shall forthwith enquire into the said complaint and may order the person in whose custody such person is detained to produce the body of such person before the High Court on a named day and to certify in writing the grounds of his detention, and the High Court shall, upon the body of such person being produced before that Court and after giving the person in whose custody he is detained an opportunity of justifying the detention, order the release of such person from such detention unless satisfied that he is being detained in accordance with the law.

F.X. made the argument that under section 4 of the 2006 Act, that he should have been subject to a two-part process:

- first he should have had an initial hearing under the Central Criminal Court,
- then after 14 days of detention to facilitate a medical examination, a second decision should be made before the court for further detention.

On 3 and 8 July 2012, Hogan J concluded that F.X.'s detention was deemed not to be in accordance with law. As a result, F.X. was released under a stay of execution whilst it was determined by the State whether his detention was constitutional.

Following the High Court decision, the Director of Public Prosecutions (DPP) brought the case before Carney J in the Central Criminal Court on 9 July 2012. The Central Criminal Court referred the case back to Hogan J in the High Court. Hogan J "indicated that, as he was not a nominated member of the Central Criminal Court, he was unable to make an order pursuant to the Act of 2006 in the proceedings brought by the DPP against the respondent".

The case was then moved to be heard in the High Court by Sheehan J.

Sheehan J "heard an application by the DPP seeking a committal of the respondent to the Central Mental Hospital pursuant to s. 4(6)(a) of the Act of 2006, so as to comply with the statutory process as determined by Hogan J. in his judgment" – on 10 July 2012 the High Court ordered F.X.'s committal to the CMH pursuant to s. 4(6)(a) of the 2006 Act until 16 July 2012.

On 16 July 2012 the case then returned once again to Carney J in the Central Criminal Court. Carney J ordered the committal of F.X. to the CMH "pending further order of the Review Board under section 13 [of the 2006 Act]"

The Clinical Director of the CMH appealed to the Supreme Court. The respondent cross-appealed.

== Holding of the Supreme Court ==
=== Appeal (Appellant) ===
The appellant appealed on the ground that Hogan J did not have jurisdiction to adjudicate on the legality of the order that was issued by the Central Criminal Court. The reason for this ground of appeal is that the High Court and Central Criminal Court are courts of equal jurisdiction.

In the Supreme Court, the appellant argued that Article 4 of the 2006 Act should not be interpreted literally. The appellant stated that the role of the courts is to look for the purpose of the legislation, which in this case is to provide lawful detention for those who need to be detained. The appellant followed up by stating that the two-part process is unnecessary if there is undisputed evidence that the detention is necessary.

=== Cross-appeal (Respondent) ===
F.X. cross-appealed on two grounds. First he felt that it was his constitutional right not to be deprived of his liberty, and the opinion of these medical professionals should not interfere with this fact. Under the 2006 Act, he argued that it was clear that this two-part process must be appreciated by the courts, and there was no legal basis for doing anything other than this. F.X. also argued that once the High Court decided that his detention was not valid in law, the only action the court could take is to order his release. The court had no power, under Article 40.4.2 of the Constitution not to grant his release.

=== Decision of the Supreme Court ===
Denham CJ delivered the only written judgment, with which the other judges concurred.

Denham CJ noted that the case raised a number of issues for the court:

"(i) Whether the High Court had the jurisdiction to conduct an Article 40.4.2 inquiry into the lawfulness of a detention ordered by the Central Criminal Court.

(ii) Whether the High Court, satisfied that the detention of the respondent was unlawful, was permitted to place a stay upon the order for release under Article 40.4.2 of the Constitution.

(iii) Whether s.4(5)(c)(i) of Criminal Law (Insanity) Act 2006, as amended required the Central Criminal Court, once satisfied that the accused was unfit to be tried, to adjourn the proceedings in order to consider the evidence of an approved medical officer adduced pursuant to s.4(6)(b) of the Act of 2006.

(iv) Whether the decision of the Review Board dated 27th April, 2012 replaced the order of the Central Criminal Court dated 26th March, 2012 as the basis of the respondent's continued detention."

(i) "Whether the High Court had the jurisdiction to conduct an Article 40.4.2 inquiry into the lawfulness of a detention ordered by the Central Criminal Court"

Denhan CJ held that the High Court does have jurisdiction under Article 40.4.2 to inquire into the lawfulness of a detention ordered by a court of coordinate jurisdiction.

(ii) "Whether the High Court, satisfied that the detention of the respondent was unlawful, was permitted to place a stay upon the order for release under Article 40.4.2 of the Constitution"

Denham CJ held that Article 40.4.2 of the Irish Constitution does not include a provision for the High Court to stay an order for release where the High Court is satisfied that the detention was unlawful. Consequently, "any order ... is made in the process of controlling the release, for the purpose of protecting the person who is incapable of protecting themselves."

(iii) "Whether s.4(5)(c)(i) of Criminal Law (Insanity) Act 2006, as amended required the Central Criminal Court, once satisfied that the accused was unfit to be tried, to adjourn the proceedings in order to consider the evidence of an approved medical officer adduced pursuant to s.4(6)(b) of the Act of 2006"

Denham CJ held that s.4(5)(c)(i) of the 2006 Act "precludes the making of an order for indefinite detention in the Central Mental Hospital...without the court first having heard the evidence of the approved medical officer adduced pursuant to s. 4(6)(b)"

(iv) "Whether the decision of the Review Board dated 27th April, 2012 replaced the order of the Central Criminal Court dated 26th March, 2012 as the basis of the respondent's continued detention"

Denham CJ held that it was not necessary to address this issue.

The court noted that "the claim under Article 40, and the cross appeal are moot" as the orders of Hogan J of 3 and 8 July 2012 "were superseded by orders of Sheehan J. of the 10th July, 2012, and Carney J. of the 16th July, 2012 respectively." The Central Criminal Court applied the two-part process as set out by Hogan J in his High Court judgment, "so no order is needed on this issue."

Denham CJ finally added that section 4 of the 2006 Act was clear. The two-part process was in place to protect the welfare of vulnerable people, and it should be committed to in full. Denham CJ made the final comment that;

In all the circumstances now pertaining, no issue of habeas corpus arises, thus no issue of a stay arises. Further, as the Central Criminal Court applied the two-stage process prescribed by Hogan J. when it made its decisions of the 10th and 16th July, 2012, no issue needs to be determined in relation to the earlier decision of the Central Criminal Court. Thus, I would dismiss the appeal and the cross appeal.
