= Good Friday closure controversy =

2010 Irish court case

The Good Friday closure controversy or Good Friday Disagreement refers to the 2010 court case which saw publicans in Limerick, Ireland apply to be exempted from the prohibition on selling alcohol on Good Friday of that year.

The case came about following the scheduling of a 2009–10 Celtic League match between Munster and Leinster at Thomond Park in the city on 2 April 2010 which coincided with Good Friday that year. Until 2018, pubs in Ireland were normally not permitted to open on either Good Friday or Christmas Day. This law, dating from 1927, also originally included Saint Patrick's Day, though that prohibition was later repealed. Drinkers often dodge the law by taking to trains, upon which alcohol is allowed, and having their parties there. In 1910, pubs in Athlone faced a similar dilemma about opening on Saint Patrick's Day but remained closed.

The match had sold out by the time the court application took place. It was due to kick off at 20:05 and television rights had already been agreed. Vintners argued that Limerick publicans stood to lose revenue valued at around €6 million or as much as €10 million if they were prevented from opening for business as normal. The State and the Garda Síochána opposed a change. It was considered a landmark case even before it had begun, and at the end was hailed as an "historic ruling", and a watershed in Church-State relations.

The vintners won and pubs were permitted to do business on Good Friday in the Republic of Ireland for the first time since 1927 (though only in Limerick). Commentators such as Ian O'Doherty in the Irish Independent expressed disappointment that it would still be illegal to sell alcohol in Dublin on the same day.

== Background ==
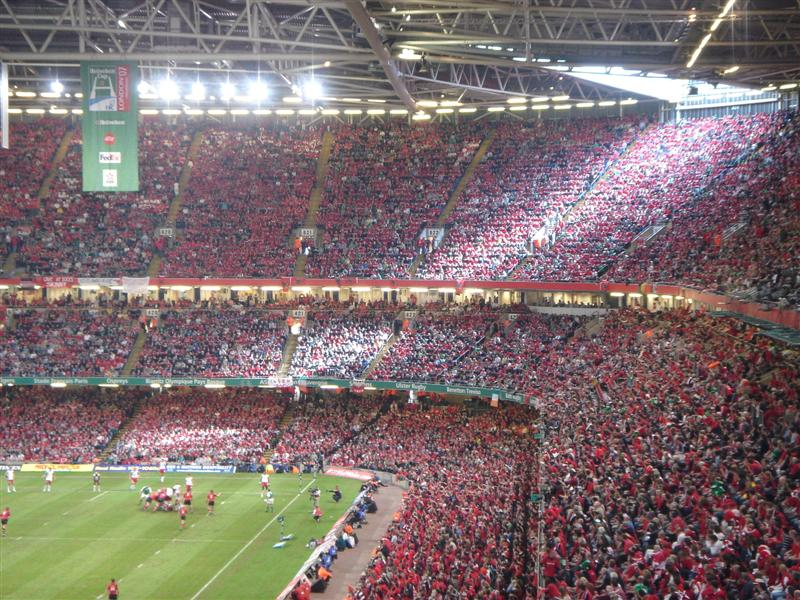
Munster fans inside Millennium Stadium

Attempts to have the date of the match changed to the day before or the day after Good Friday were unsuccessful. On 9 March 2010, and with no alternative date offered for the match, vintners' representatives, recently resigned Minister for Defence Willie O'Dea, and Mayor of Limerick Kevin Kiely were among those to discuss the issue with the Garda Síochána in Limerick. A legal application was determined to be the best solution with "no other option" available.

The controversy divided religious groups in Ireland, many of which were concerned with the preservation of the holiness of Good Friday.

I heard someone quoted this week who said that rugby is more important than religion – that's just ridiculous and it's a shame. If you identify yourself as a Catholic then you should be nowhere near Thomond Park or a pub on that day. [...] This is like something out of the Old Testament. If you're going against God and making a public stand about it then you are serving Mammon over God. I don't care how much money you pull in, it will backfire on you on a spiritual level.—Brother Sean O'Connor, head of the Franciscan Friars in Moyross who landed from the United States in 2007, gives his opinion on the controversy.

== Seanad Éireann debate ==
The issue was debated in the Seanad. Joe O'Toole requested a change in the law, saying: "Everyone's a winner. Free will prevails, the Church−State separation is maintained. We render to Munster the things that are Munster's and to God the things that are God's. We save jobs. The economy gains". Ivana Bacik echoed those sentiments when she said: "Let those of us who don't believe that Good Friday is a particularly special day choose to do what we want to do in pubs and clubs". David Norris described as "outrageous" the decision to play a rugby match on Good Friday, bemoaning that Sundays had already fallen to "the British multinationals". Eoghan Harris described the notion of a Good Friday rugby match as "odd and wrong" in a land "impregnated with Christian symbolism". Donie Cassidy lamented the lack of respect for "the crucifixion of the Good Lord". Minister for Justice and Law Reform Dermot Ahern, when asked for his opinion, said the issue was for the courts.

== Court application ==
On 15 March 2010, 60 vintners voted to apply for the exemption at the courthouse in Limerick on 23 March 2010. This was thought to be the first time that the Good Friday alcohol ban had been challenged by publicans. Sweeney McGann Solicitors of Limerick acted for the Vinters. Chairman of Limerick's Vintners Federation Jerry O'Dea applied to Limerick District Court for an exemption under Section 10 of the Intoxicating liquor Act 1962. Mayor of Limerick Kevin Kiely wrote a letter in support of the application. Gearoid McGann was the solicitor representing the vintners and Michael Murray represented the Garda Síochána and the State. The Roman Catholic Diocese of Limerick did not object in court.

Judge Tom O'Donnell delayed the verdict until 9:30 on 25 March 2010, citing that he would have to examine case law. At more than 90 minutes, the hearing proved to be longer than the actual rugby match.

President of the Vintners' Federation of Ireland (VFI) Dave Hickey had been quoted in the Irish Independent on 2 March 2010 as saying there was "not a hope in the world" that any judge would exempt Limerick's pubs. Munster captain Paul O'Connell was quoted by The Irish Times as being in favour of the exemption for economic reasons.

== Verdict ==
On 25 March 2010, Judge Tom O'Donnell granted Limerick publicans an exemption from the state ban on opening on Good Friday. He recognised the potential for "controversy in several quarters".

Under Section 10 of the Intoxicating liquor Act 1962, applicants must possess a license to trade in the area, the area must not be the county borough of Dublin, an event of significance must be occurring in the area and there must be "a considerable number" of people in the area: the judge agreed with all four points. O'Donnell noted that one hotelier had described the match as having "an international flavour as journalists from the UK were booked into his hotel to report on the game [...] that over 2,000-room nights would be availed of and that certain hotels [...] had to turn away pre and post match functions. He even equated the match to be on a par with the famous Galway Plate". O'Donnell responded to comparisons with a 1961 application for a dance licence in Kilkee, 1971 judicial remarks on the definition of a "special event" and a 1984 High Court case which sought to clarify if a wedding was considered a "special event" in law by saying that none were in any way like this case and that there was no legal definition for the term "special event". O'Donnell described the application as "a last resort", observed that Thomond Park's stadium license would permit alcohol to be served on the day, that it would be "somewhat absurd" if the pubs lost out on business and also took into account that there were "health and safety reasons" for opening the pubs to serve the thousands of fans leaving the stadium when the match had ended.

Publicans in Limerick were granted legal permission to trade between 18:00 and 23:30 on Good Friday 2010 (the application had sought hours of 18:00 until midnight). An area map delivered by the applicants had proposed the city of Limerick, Raheen Dooradoyle, Annacotty, Corbally, and Castletroy as the areas in which businesses would freely operate; the judge agreed with this and signed the map.

Having considered all the submissions, I am satisfied that the match has all the vestiges and attributes of a special event. I accept that this decision may cause controversy in several quarters and, having considered the arguments, I wish to point out that the District Court is a court of record and not a court of precedent.—Judge Tom O'Donnell upon delivering his verdict at Limerick District Court.

=== Reaction to verdict ===
Solicitor for the applicants Gearoid McGann of Sweeney McGann Solicitors called it "a groundbreaking decision". Limerick traders celebrated by selling t-shirts bearing slogans such as "Officially bigger than the Catholic Church: Munster Rugby", "Mass will now take place at Thomond Park" and "We have no bishop, no minister and no hurling team, but we can drink on Good Friday", referring to the scandal-hit Donal Murray (sexual abuse scandal in Limerick diocese), Willie O'Dea ("brothelgate") and an internal dispute involving the county's hurling team. Mayor Kiely asked that the law be updated to allow alcohol on all religious occasions:

I don't see why Ireland discriminates against its own people. If people want to go to the pub and have a drink of watch a sports match, they should be allowed to do that. Even the Vatican city doesn't have this ridiculous law. The law was last amended in 1928, and it is about time it is reviewed, because we are living in the dark ages.

Mayor Kiely told the religious and anti-drinkers to "get real" and invited people from across Ireland to come to the city to drink on the day. Former President of the Gaelic Athletic Association Mick Loftus expressed his disappointment "in the light of the huge alcohol problem which this country is battling".

Roman Catholic priests in Limerick made known their disappointment that this was to be "another long boozy weekend" in the city. Father Adrian Egan lamented: "Good Friday was a special day and a different day in our culture and our history – a day to slow down and reflect". Prayer vigils and Stations of the Cross rituals were planned to be performed outside the stadium by the religious.

== See also ==
- 2009–10 Celtic League
