= Rockwell College =

Private day and boarding school in County Tipperary, Ireland

Coordinates: 52.4592°N 7.8936°W

- Coláiste Charraig an Tobair
- Cashel, County Tipperary; Ireland

Information
- Type: Voluntary day and boarding school
- Motto: Inter Mutanda Constantia ("Constancy in the midst of change")
- Established: 1864
- President: Jack Meade
- Principal: Audrey O’Byrne
- Years: 1st - 6th
- Gender: Male and Female
- Age: 12 to 19
- Enrollment: 500
- Colours: Blue and white
- Religious compilation: Roman Catholicism (Spiritans)
- Website: www.rockwellcollege.ie

Rockwell College (Irish: Coláiste Charraig an Tobair), founded in 1864, is a voluntary day and boarding Catholic secondary school near Cashel, County Tipperary in Ireland.

The school has a rugby tradition and has won the Munster Schools Senior Cup 26 times and the Munster Schools Junior Cup 20 times with 22 full Irish internationals. Rockwell is run by the Spiritans. Its list of former pupils and teachers includes two Presidents of Ireland.

== History ==
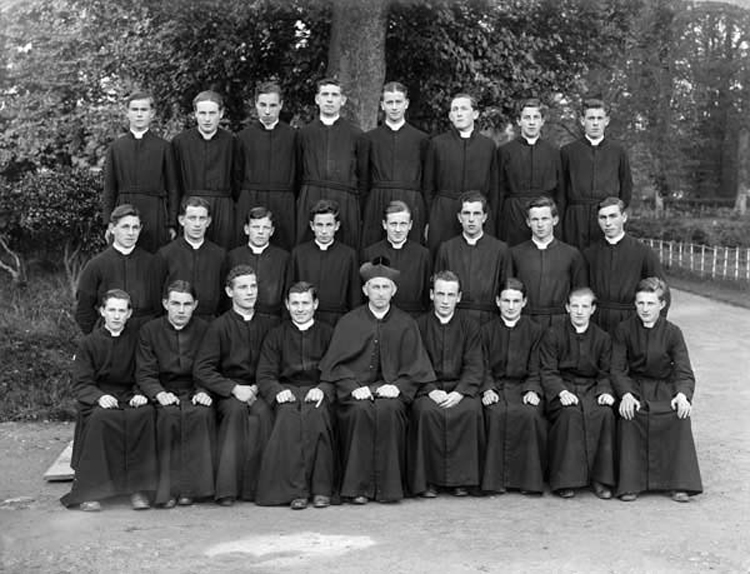
Group of priests commissioned by Rev. John J. McCarthy, St. Josephs Missionary House, Rockwell, 1932

Rockwell College was founded in 1864 by two Spiritan priests (also known as the Holy Ghost Fathers) to provide education to the sons of Roman Catholics during a time when Penal Laws were still in place against the Catholic majority in Ireland.

Rockwell College played an important role in the development of the Irish State and several prominent figures of the Irish Revolutionary period taught at or attended the school. Éamon de Valera taught mathematics there as a young teacher and fellow 1916 Proclamation signatory Thomas MacDonagh attended as a pupil. In 1964, as part of the centenary celebrations President Éamon de Valera returned to the school, 60 years after he taught there.

In 1997, Pat O'Sullivan became Rockwell's first lay principal, and in 2012 Audrey O'Byrne became the college's first female principal.

== Sister schools ==
- Blackrock College
- St Mary's College, Dublin
- St Michael's College, Dublin
- Templeogue College

== Notable past pupils ==
=== Politics ===
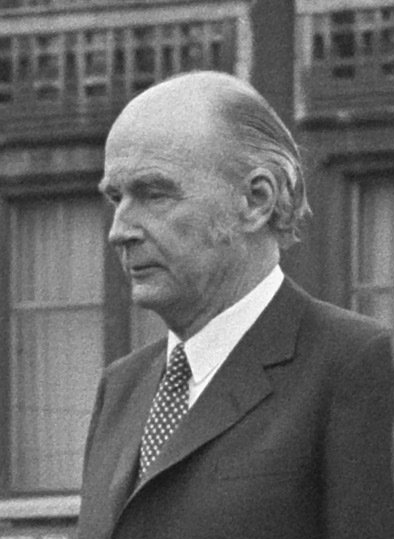
Former President of Ireland Dr Patrick Hillery, Rockwell past pupil

- Patrick Hillery, President of Ireland 1976–1990
- Éamon de Valera, Taoiseach and President of Ireland (1959–1973), was a mathematics teacher at the school.
- Fionán Lynch, Deputy Leader of Fine Gael, TD from 1918 to 1944, Leas-Cheann Comhairle of Dáil Éireann from 1938 to 1939 and Government Minister from 1922 to 1932
- James John O'Shee, member of the Irish Parliamentary Party, MP for West Waterford (1895–1918) and co-founder of the Irish Land & Labour Association.
- Michael Heffernan, TD and Leader of the Farmers Party
- Joseph McDonagh, TD for Tipperary North 1918–1921
- Pierce McCan, TD for Tipperary East 1918–1919
- Tadhg Crowley, Irish revolutionary and Fianna Fáil Senator and TD for Limerick
- Henry Barniville, Senator
- Andrew Boylan, Fine Gael TD for Cavan–Monaghan
- Ruairí Brugha, Fianna Fáil TD, Senator and MEP
- Maurice Manning, Chancellor of National University of Ireland, Fine Gael Senator and president of the Irish Human Rights Commission
- Andrew Fogarty, Fianna Fáil TD and member of Seanad Éireann.
- William Quirke, Fianna Fáil Senator and Tipperary IRA leader during the Irish War of Independence and the Irish Civil War.
- Denis Jones, Fine Gael TD for Limerick West, 1957–1977, and Leas-Cheann Comhairle
- Thomas Walsh, Fianna Fáil TD for Carlow–Kilkenny and Minister for Agriculture 1951–1954
- John J. Nash, Fianna Fáil member of Seanad Éireann.
- Patrick Teehan, Fianna Fáil member of Seanad Éireann.
- Timothy McAuliffe, Labour member of Seanad Éireann.
- Seán McCarthy, former Minister of State for Finance and Technology
- Michael Ahern, Junior Minister for Industry and Commerce and TD for Cork East
- Garret Ahearn, Fine Gael member of Seanad Éireann.
- Enda Marren, Fine Gael trustee and Member of Irish Council of State

=== Legal ===
- John L. Murray, Chief Justice of Ireland, former judge of the Irish Supreme Court, former judge of the European Court of Justice, Attorney General of Ireland, and former Chancellor of the University of Limerick
- Maurice Collins, judge of the Supreme Court
- John Rogers, Attorney General of Ireland 1984–1987
- David Keane, judge of the High Court
- Mark Heslin, judge of the High Court
- Fionán Lynch, judge of the Circuit Court
- Iain Morley, resident judge of Saint Kitts and Nevis

=== Business ===
- Richie Boucher, chairman at CRH plc
- Harry Crosbie, developer of Point Village
- Frank Mulcahy, woollen manufacturer at the Ardfinnan Woollen Mills.

=== Sport ===
- Mick Ryan (rugby union), Irish rugby international
- Jack Ryan (rugby union), Irish rugby international
- Patrick Stokes (rugby union), Irish rugby international
- Michael Heffernan (politician), Irish rugby international
- Michael Dargan, Irish rugby international
- Bertie O'Hanlon, Irish rugby international
- Timothy McGrath, Irish rugby international
- Mick English (rugby union), Irish rugby international
- Frank Byrne (rugby union), Irish rugby international
- Paddy McGrath, Irish rugby international
- John Moroney, Irish rugby international
- Willie Duggan, Irish rugby international
- Paul McNaughton, Irish rugby international and manager of the Irish rugby team (2008 to 2011)
- Gary Halpin, Irish rugby international
- Jack Clarke, Irish rugby international
- Gabriel Fulcher, Irish rugby international
- Mick Fitzgibbon, Irish rugby international
- Denis Leamy, Irish rugby international
- John Fogarty, Irish rugby international
- JJ Hanrahan, Connacht rugby player
- Diarmuid Barron, Munster rugby player
- Brian Gleeson, Munster rugby player
- Paddy Butler, rugby player
- Denis Fogarty, rugby player
- Mark Melbourne, rugby player
- Sean McNulty, USA rugby international
- Harry McNulty, captain of Ireland national rugby sevens team and Olympian
- Malachy Sheridan, Olympian
- Phil Conway, Olympian
- Walter Swinburn, jockey, who won 8 British Classics, including the 1981 Derby with Shergar
- Pat McGrath, hurler
- Peter McGarry (hurler), hurler
- Conor Sweeney, Tipperary GAA Football Captain, Winning the 2020 Munster Football Championship
- Joseph Patrick O'Brien, jockey and horse racing trainer
- Donnacha O'Brien, jockey and horse racing trainer

=== Clergy ===
- Michael Browne
- Pádraig de Brún, former president of National University of Ireland, Galway
- Denis Fahey
- Henry Aloysius Gogarty
- Aengus Finucane, former chief executive of Concern Worldwide, was a teacher
- Jack Finucane
- Archbishop James Leen, Bishop of Port Louis, Mauritius.
- John Joseph McCarthy
- Canon Edmond Kelly, WWI Military Chaplain and Parish Priest in County Tipperary.

=== Others ===
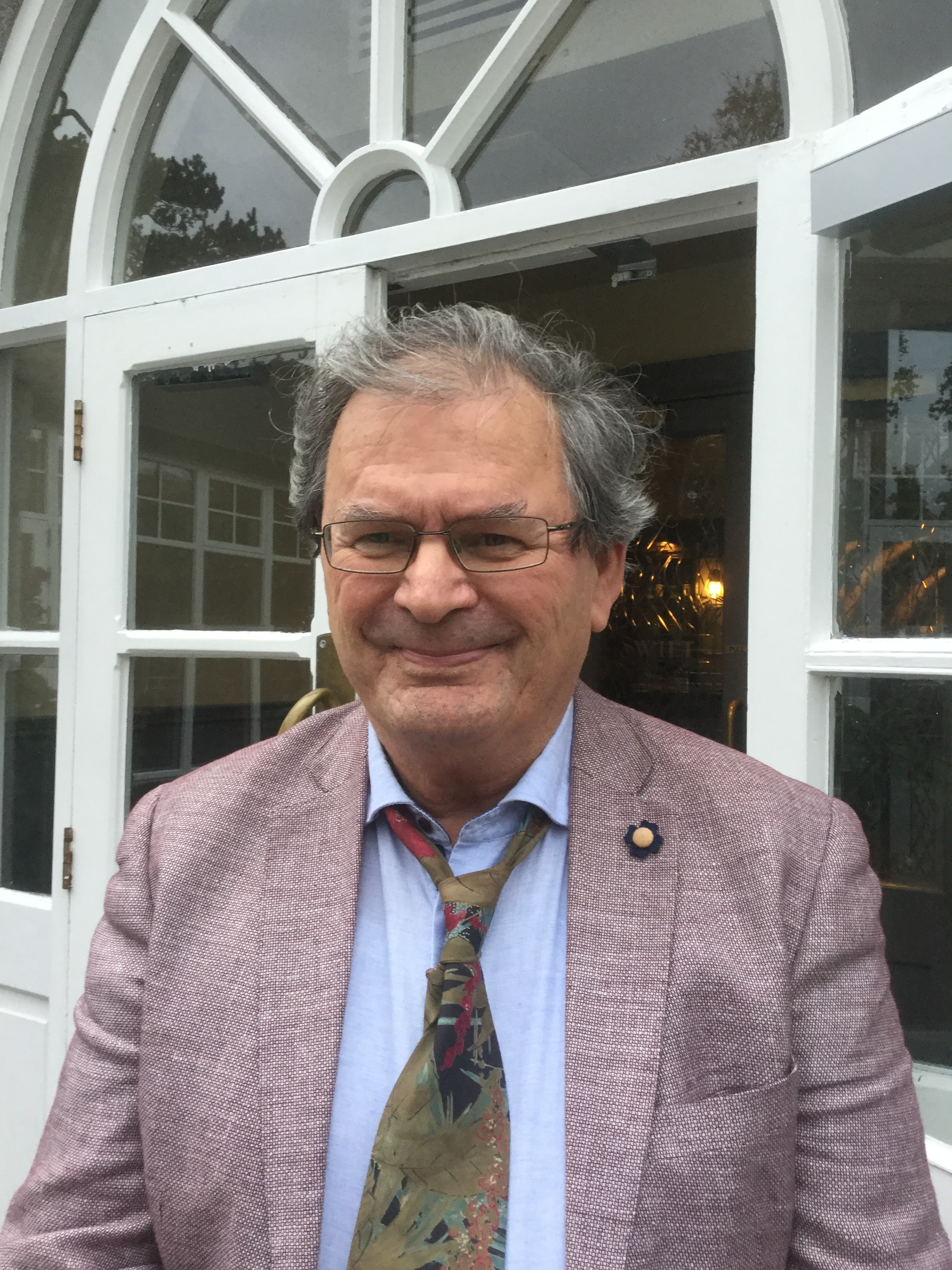
Writer Gabriel Rosenstock, Rockwell past pupil

- John Francis Crowley, Irish revolutionary and hunger striker
- John J. Collins, Biblical scholar, was a Spiritan for nine years, professor in Yale
- John M. Feehan, author and publisher
- Thomas MacDonagh - poet, teacher and co-leader of 1916 Rising, for which he was executed.
- Colm Mangan - former Chief of Staff of the Irish Defence Forces,
- Pádraic Ó Conaire, writer
- Liam O'Flaherty, writer
- Kevin Roche, architect
- Gabriel Rosenstock, writer
