= Thomas E. O'Donnell (judge) =

Irish judge

His Honour Judge Thomas E. O'Donnell

Judge of the Circuit Court
- In office 2011 – 2024 (Retired)
- Nominated by: Government of Ireland
- Appointed by: Mary McAleese

Judge of the District Court
- In office 1998–2011
- Nominated by: Government of Ireland
- Appointed by: Mary McAleese

Personal details
- Born: 1954 (age 71–72) Limerick
- Education: University College Dublin

Thomas E. O'Donnell was a judge of the Irish Circuit Court from 2011 to 2024. Prior to his appointment, he was a judge of the Irish District Court from 1998.

Born in Limerick of a distinguished legal family he was educated at Crescent College, Limerick and at Mungret College, Limerick. He studied law at University College Dublin and was enrolled as a solicitor in 1976. He was assigned as judge of the District Court for Limerick City in 1999, where he was "highly regarded". In 2014, he was assigned as the sole Judge for the South Western circuit, which includes the counties of Limerick, Clare and Kerry, and in part coincides geographically with the old Munster Circuit described by Maurice Healy. Judge O'Donnell has three sons. His second son, Mark O'Donnell, represented the Qatar International Rugby team in the 2016 West Asian Division 3 Championship, having qualified under the three year residency rule.

== Good Friday Ruling ==
On, March 25, 2010, Judge Tom O’Donnell upheld the application made by some 100 vintners in Limerick city and surrounding urban areas to allow them open their premises on Good Friday, April 2. An application was put before the court under section 10 of the Intoxicating liquor Act 1962, where an area exemption was sought to allow pubs to trade on Good Friday. In a Landmark Ruling Judge O’Donnell delivered his ruling stating that the “genesis of the application was that a Magners League game between Munster and Leinster was on in Thomond Park on Friday, April 2, Good Friday, and that local vintners sought to open their pubs for a period of time, between 6pm and midnight on that day.He commented that he was satisfied that the match had the attributes and vestiges of a special event. “I’m granting the application, but subject to one condition, and it is to amend the trading hours to 6pm to 11.30pm”.

=== Reaction to verdict ===
Solicitor for the applicants Gearoid McGann of Sweeney McGann Solicitors called it "a groundbreaking decision". Limerick traders celebrated by selling t-shirts bearing slogans such as "Officially bigger than the Catholic Church: Munster Rugby", "Mass will now take place at Thomond Park" and "We have no bishop, no minister and no hurling team, but we can drink on Good Friday", referring to the scandal-hit Donal Murray (sexual abuse scandal in Limerick diocese), Willie O'Dea ("brothelgate") and an internal dispute involving the county's hurling team. Mayor Kiely asked that the law be updated to allow alcohol on all religious occasions:

I don't see why Ireland discriminates against its own people. If people want to go to the pub and have a drink of watch a sports match, they should be allowed to do that. Even the Vatican city doesn't have this ridiculous law. The law was last amended in 1928, and it is about time it is reviewed, because we are living in the dark ages.

Mayor Kiely told the religious and anti-drinkers to "get real" and invited people from across Ireland to come to the city to drink on the day. Former President of the Gaelic Athletic Association Mick Loftus expressed his disappointment "in the light of the huge alcohol problem which this country is battling".

Father Adrian Egan lamented: "Good Friday was a special day and a different day in our culture and our history – a day to slow down and reflect". Prayer vigils and Stations of the Cross rituals were planned to be performed outside the stadium by the religious.
