= Mark Heslin =

Irish judge

The Hon. Mr. Justice Mark Heslin

Judge of the High Court
- Incumbent
- Assumed office 2 December 2019
- Nominated by: Government of Ireland
- Appointed by: Michael D. Higgins

Personal details
- Born: Longford, Ireland
- Education: University College Galway; Law Society of Ireland

Mark Heslin is an Irish judge and lawyer who has served as a Judge of the High Court since December 2019. He was formerly a litigation solicitor at a commercial law firm.

== Early life ==
Heslin was born in Longford, County Longford, to Noel and Máiréad Heslin. He received his primary school education from Ballinalee National School and Melview National School, and attended secondary school at St. Mel's College and Rockwell College. He studied law at University College Galway and served a term as the auditor of the Literary and Debating Society. He subsequently studied at the Law Society of Ireland and was admitted to the Role of Solicitors in 1995.

== Legal career ==
He started his career at Beauchamps Solicitors in Dublin. He was a senior partner in the firm in litigation, with particular expertise on commercial disputes in the Irish courts. He advised on a wide range of law and his clients included Allied Irish Banks and the National Asset Management Agency.

During his time as a solicitor, he was a contributor to academic journals and tutored classes at the Law Society.

In 2012, he argued against the televising of court cases in Ireland.

== Judicial career ==
Heslin was appointed to the High Court in December 2019. He is the first High Court judge to come from Longford.

He has presided over cases involving judicial review, injunction applications, insolvency law, and commercial disputes. In January 2020, he overturned a decision of An Bord Pleanála which had refused permission for the development of a Narconon facility in County Meath.
