= Mark Melbourne =

Irish rugby union player

Mark Melbourne (15 April 1984, Clonmel, County Tipperary) is an Irish rugby union footballer. He plays lock for Garryowen.

== Career ==
Mark began playing rugby union with his local rugby club Clonmel R.F.C. He then moved to Rockwell College where he played Senior Cup rugby. When he left school he joined Garryowen. In the 2003–04 season, he joined Munster as an Academy player. Mark made his Munster debut in 2003/2004 season on 16 April 2004 against Edinburgh Rugby in the Celtic (now Magners) league. He was released by Munster Rugby at the end of the 2008/2009 season.
