= Marney Cunningham =

Irish rugby player and Catholic priest (1933–2000)

Fr. Marnie Cunningham
- Born: 23 June 1933
- Died: 31 May 2000 (aged 66)
- Occupations: Priest; Rugby player

Fr. Marnie Cunningham (23 June 1933 – 31 May 2000) was an Irish international rugby player and Catholic priest. He is one of only two priests to have played international rugby for Ireland (along with Monsignor Tom Gavin).

== Background ==
Cunningham was born in Cork on 23 June 1933 and educated at Presentation Brothers College in Cork City. He represented Presentation College at rugby and also represented Munster schools. He went on to study Civil Engineering at University College Cork, graduating in 1956. He also played for the UCC rugby team and won the Munster Senior Cup with them in 1955. He was a member of a distinguished rugby family as his father (Jack) played for and captained Cork Constitution. His brother played for the Irish Province of Munster. Cunningham also played for the Irish Universities and the Barbarians

== Rugby career ==
Cunningham played for the Ireland national rugby union team 7 times between 1955 and 1956. He played flanker / wing forward. He won his first international cap as a 21-year-old against France in January 1955. He was capped three times in 1956 and was a member of the Ireland side that scored an 11–3 victory over Wales at Lansdowne Road in March 1956, a win that deprived Wales of a Grand Slam. He scored a famous try in this match. This was his final game for Ireland. At the age of 22 he gave up international rugby to be ordained as a Catholic priest

== Personal life ==
He served a priest in the Roman Catholic Diocese of Salford in England.

While a priest he led a protest march outside Thomond Park when Munster played against the apartheid-dominated Springboks

He died in Salford on 31 May 2000, after a long illness, just before his 67th birthday.
