= Paddy Stokes (rugby union) =

Irish rugby union player

- Full name: Patrick Stokes
- Born: 3 April 1890 Fethard, County Tipperary, Ireland
- Died: 29 October 1970 (aged 80) Fethard, County Tipperary, Ireland

Rugby union career
- Position: Wing forward
International career
Years	Team	Apps	(Points)
1913–22	Ireland	12	(12)

Patrick Stokes (3 April 1890 – 29 October 1970) was an Irish international rugby union player.

Born in Fethard, County Tipperary, Stokes was the son of an Irish record–holding pole vaulter and attended Rockwell College, before further studies at University College Dublin (UDC).

Stokes was a lightly built wing forward and shares with Tony Courtney the distinction of being the first UCD player to represent Leinster. He was capped 12 times for Ireland, making appearances both sides of World War I. After returning to Fethard, Stokes played his rugby for Garryowen and twice featured in Munster Senior Cup–winning sides.

A medical doctor, Stokes was appointed coroner for East Tipperary in 1927.

== See also ==
- List of Ireland national rugby union players
