= Rory Scannell =

Irish rugby union player

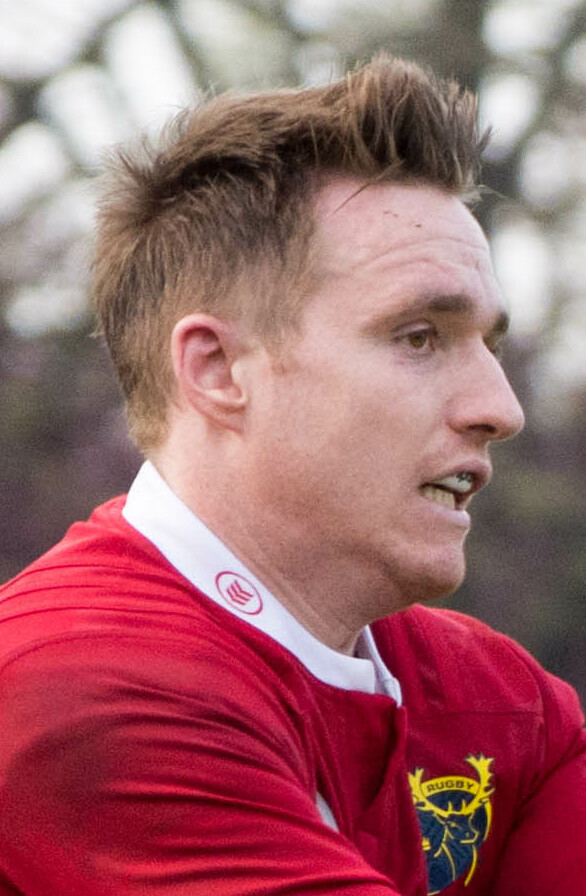
- Scannell in 2017
- Born: 22 December 1993 (age 32) Cork, Ireland
- Height: 1.78 m (5 ft 10 in)
- Weight: 96 kg (15.1 st; 212 lb)
- School: Presentation Brothers College
- University: University College Cork
- Notable relative(s): Niall Scannell (brother); Billy Scannell (brother); Jack O'Sullivan (cousin); Donal O'Sullivan (grandfather)

Rugby union career
- Position(s): Centre, Fly-half, Fullback
Amateur team(s)
Years	Team	Apps	(Points)
2012–16	Dolphin	26	(124)
Senior career
Years	Team	Apps	(Points)
2014–2025	Munster	206	(186)
- Correct as of 31 May 2025
International career
Years	Team	Apps	(Points)
2013	Ireland U20	9	(38)
2015	Emerging Ireland	2	(8)
2017	Ireland	3	(6)
- Correct as of 24 June 2017

Rory Scannell (born 22 December 1993) is an Irish rugby union player who last played as a centre for United Rugby Championship club Munster.

== Munster ==
Scannell made his senior Munster debut on 1 November 2014, starting at inside centre against Cardiff Blues in a 2014–15 Pro12 fixture. He started at fly-half against Cardiff Blues on 14 February 2015. Scannell was nominated for the 2015 John McCarthy Award for Academy Player of the Year in April 2015. On 14 November 2015, Scannell made his European Rugby Champions Cup debut for Munster, coming off the bench in their opening 2015–16 pool game against Benetton.

In December 2015, Scannell signed a contract with Munster which saw him join the senior squad from the academy on a development contract from the 2016–17 season, before advancing to a full contract for the 2017–18 season. On 25 March 2016, Scannell won the Man-of-the-Match award in Munster's 47–0 win against Zebre. On 7 May 2016, Scannell scored two tries in Munster's 31–15 win against Scarlets, a win which secured Champions Cup rugby for the following season. In May 2016, Scannell won the Munster Young Player of the Year Award and the John McCarthy Award for Academy Player of the Year.

On 28 October 2016, Scannell won the Man-of-the-Match award after he scored the winning drop goal in Munster's 15–14 away win against Ulster. On 24 January 2017, it was announced that Scannell had signed a contract extension with Munster until June 2019. On 4 March 2017, Scannell filled in at fly-half against Cardiff Blues when Ian Keatley went off injured, scoring 13 points, including a drop-goal that gave Munster the lead with minutes left of the game, in the 23–13 away win in Cardiff Arms Park. On 5 May 2017, Scannell was named in the 2016–17 Pro12 Dream Team.

Scannell was nominated for the 2018 Munster Rugby Player of the Year award in April 2018, his second nomination for the award. At the point of his nomination, Scannell had missed just 3 games during the 2017–18 season, and had played every minute of Munster's games in the 2017–18 European Rugby Champions Cup. Scannell scored a last-minute 55-metre penalty to earn Munster a 25–24 win against Glasgow Warriors on 27 October 2018 in the 2018–19 Pro14. He signed a two-year contract extension with Munster in December 2018.

Scannell earned his 100th cap for Munster in their fixture against Scarlets on 2 March 2019, becoming the youngest player to do so for the province. He signed a two-year contract extension with the province in February 2021 and made his 100th Pro14 appearance as a replacement in Munster's 22–10 away win against Edinburgh in round 12 of the 2020–21 Pro14 on 20 February 2021. Scannell earned his 150th cap for Munster in their 18–13 home win against Ulster in round 10 of the 2021–22 United Rugby Championship on 8 January 2022. He started in Munster's historic 28–14 win against a South Africa XV in Páirc Uí Chaoimh on 10 November 2022, and signed a two-year contract extension with the province in January 2023.

Scannell earned his 200th Munster cap when he came off the bench for Alex Nankivell in their quarter final fixture against Sharks during the 2024/25 United Rugby Championship playoffs. He was subsequently chosen to be one of Munster's three kickers during the penalty shootout to determine the match after the game ended as a draw in extra time. The province lost the shootout six successful penalties to five.

He departed Munster rugby at the end of the 2024/25 season, after achieving his 200th cap.

== Ireland ==
Scannell made his debut for Ireland Under-20 on 1 February 2013, starting against Wales Under-20 in the 2013 Under-20 Six Nations Championship. He also played for Ireland Under-20 during the 2013 IRB Junior World Championship.

Scannell was named in the Emerging Ireland squad for the 2015 World Rugby Tbilisi Cup on 19 May 2015. He came off the bench during the opening 25–0 win against Emerging Italy on 13 June 2015. Scannell started against Uruguay on 17 June 2015, scoring 8 points in Emerging Ireland's 33–7 win.

On 21 November 2016, Scannell was added to the senior Ireland squad for their 2016 end-of-year rugby union internationals fixture against Australia. On 23 January 2017, Scannell was named in the Ireland squad for the opening two rounds of the 2017 Six Nations Championship and he was also selected in the squad for the 2017 Summer Tour against the United States and Japan. On 10 June 2017, in the one-off test against the United States, Scannell made his debut for the senior national team, converting two tries in Ireland's 55–19 win in the Red Bull Arena, New Jersey. When he took to the field, Scannell and his brother, Niall, became the first Munster siblings to represent Ireland in the professional era. A week later, Scannell made his first start for Ireland, doing so against Japan in Shizuoka Stadium, Shizuoka and scoring two points in his sides 50–22 win.

== Honours ==
=== Munster ===
- United Rugby Championship
  - Winner (1): 2022–23

=== Ireland under-18s ===
- European Under-18 Rugby Union Championship
  - Winner (1): (2011)

=== Emerging Ireland ===
- World Rugby Tbilisi Cup
  - Winner (1): (2015)
