= Students Harness Aid for the Relief of the Elderly =

Irish charity organisation

- Founded: 1970, Presentation Brothers College, Cork
- Founder: Brother Jerome Kelly
- Purpose: Elderly poor
- Region served: Cork city
- Method: Christmas Fast & Fundraising Campaign
- Volunteers: 1800 approx.
- Website: www.sharecork.org

Students Harness Aid for Relief of Elderly (formerly Schoolboys Harness Aid for Relief of Elderly) or SHARE, is a charitable organisation based in Cork, Ireland, dedicated to providing housing and other support for the elderly poor. An article in the regional Southern Star newspaper reputedly stated that SHARE had "brought help and hope, homes and happiness to the lonely old people who have been forgotten by society".

The organisation was founded in 1970 by Brother Jerome Kelly and students of Presentation Brothers College, Cork, to deal with the social issues of the time. Other schools in Cork later joined, until representatives from 18 secondary schools were involved with the charity. Since its founding, over 200 custom-built homes have been provided by the organisation.

Work by the members of SHARE is year-round, but its most active period is the Christmas Fast and Fundraising Campaign, when over 1800 students have been involved in collecting in Cork city centre. The charity's sole collection period lasts only ten days, which has made it a recognisable part of the Cork Christmas season. It has received recognition from the media, from Irish political figures, and the people of Cork; but it is the involvement of students from all of Cork city's secondary schools which has reportedly made SHARE "a truly unique and effective organisation".

== History ==
In 1969, Brother Jerome Kelly returned home from missionary work and was made principal of Presentation Brothers College. He organised a series of workshops, in which the students of Presentation College were encouraged to think globally and act locally. The senior students were sent out to walk the lanes and side streets of Cork City and identify the major problems themselves. While the city centre's main thoroughfares were bustling with "elegant buildings and fashionable shop windows", there existed a different reality in the dreary alleys and decaying tenements. The students were "unanimous in their belief that the greatest single need was the plight of the elderly citizens… apparently forgotten by their own people".

The new Crib in Daunt Square, in 2006.

In 1970, SHARE was founded when a group of 12 students erected a makeshift crib on St. Patrick's Street and fasted for thirty hours to attract attention to the plight of the elderly. At first they aimed to help the elderly by renovating the "depressing attic rooms and tiny basement flats," until the uncaring landlords increased the rent. The students obtained the support of the civic leaders at the time for their project, getting "free land in key areas of the city," and were then "faced with challenge of fundraising and ensuring homes for the elderly were built." Through their work, they had sufficient funds by 1975 to begin building the first SHARE Complex.

In 1976, twelve houses were built and furnished at Clochán Barra on Sheare's Street and accommodation for thirteen people was provided at Grenville Place. Over the following two years, eleven homes were provided at Sheare's Street, seven houses at Sunday's Well, and 13 houses at Fair Street. The nineteen houses at Shandon were formally opened by the Taoiseach Jack Lynch.

Following the securing of these new homes for the residents, the practice of regular visits was begun to deal with the problem of loneliness. The enthusiastic support of the people of Cork ensured the organisation's rapid development throughout the city, and the support of the students' parents led to the establishment of "SHARE Mothers." SHARE celebrated its 10th anniversary in 1980, with the fifteen-house complex at Abbey Street opened by President of Ireland Patrick Hillery. Complexes were also opened at Dyke Parade and Ardfert, Great William O’Brien Street. In 1988, President Hillery also opened a 32 house complex at Grattan Street.

"S.H.A.R.E.'s efforts to provide a greater feeling of security and a more tangible sense of community led to the organisation adopting the "Sheltered Housing" concept with the opening of Dún Rís in 1988 and Mt. St. Joseph (a gift from the Presentation Brothers) in 1993. The opening of the Day Care Centre in 2001 carries this concept a step further."

== Organisation ==
The Preslink Choir singing outside the Crib in Daunt Square, in 2006.

Although originally made up solely of students of Presentation College, by 2007, SHARE was organised by an elected executive committee of 50–60, composed of students from the 18 secondary schools in Cork city. These students are typically fifth year or senior cycle students. Pres maintains a strong presence on the committee, with the chairman typically elected from the school.

The organisation's sole collection period each year is the "Christmas Fast & Fundraising Campaign", which starts on 14 December and spans the 10-day run up to Christmas. During this time, the members of the executive committee spend as much as ten hours collecting in the city centre each day, with the focal point of the collection at The Crib in Daunt's Square. Additionally, there is a separate Fasting Committee, which spends 24 hours fasting outside the crib at a time. The campaign is therefore linked with the Christian message of the Gospel and the significance and relevance of the Christmas Crib. Cribs are also placed in some of the city's main suburban shopping centres.

Overall, 1800 volunteer students also get involved in this collection, bearing the organisation's "trademark yellow collection boxes and enthusiastic smiles", regardless of the weather. SHARE aims to have at least 100 collectors on the streets at any one time. While collection only occurs at Christmas, members of SHARE's executive visit any resident of the housing schemes that desires visitation, on a regular basis. Although they are not obliged to continue to do this on a permanent basis (as the executive is changed each school year), some develop a bond of friendship and continue to keep in touch.

== Facilities ==
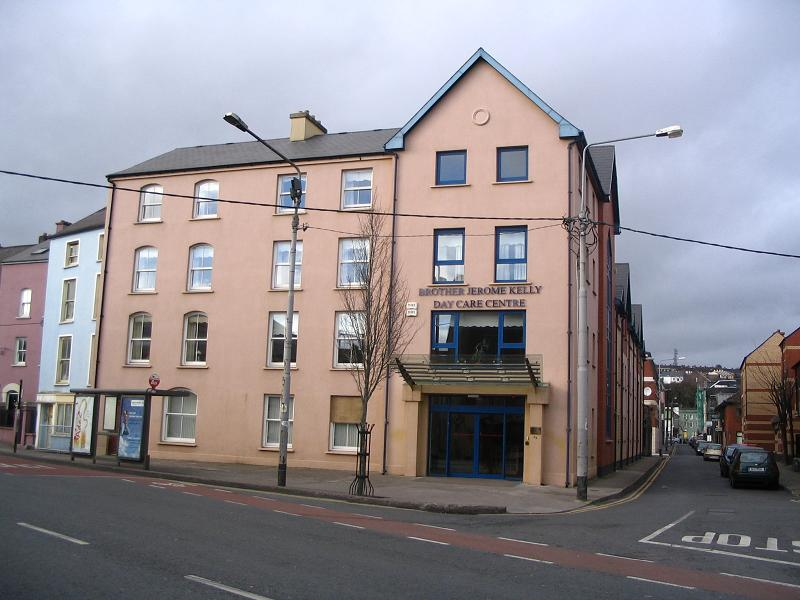
The Brother Jerome Kelly Day Care Centre, on Sheare's Street.

There are 167 SHARE housing units in total, located in clusters throughout Cork city: in Blackpool, Shandon Street, Sheare's Street, Grattan Street, Abbey Street, Blarney Street and Sunday's Well. These facilities are a mix of sheltered housing, apartments and small individual homes, each with "all the modern requirements" and fully furnished. Here the elderly have "the freedom of their own comfortable space in a safe environment", and are provided with a number of practical services; including medical treatments, meals, laundry services and support networks as necessary.

Additionally, there is the Day Care Centre at Sheare's Street, "a really homely centre for elderly people, with practical and fun activities." Activities available include dance, arts and crafts, bingo, darts, quiz games, knitting, sewing, baking, card games, snooker and drama. Maintaining, managing and refurbishing these facilities requires continuous funding. As the chairman of the 2007 Executive, Kevin Olden, said:

We just want to get the job done and keep improving and maintaining the houses and the facilities at the Day Care Centre. We need all the help we can get – it's a challenge to keep the thing going and we want to keep up the standards and services S.H.A.R.E. has worked hard for over the last 38 years.

== Recognition and media coverage ==
Since the opening of the first SHARE homes in 1976, complexes have been opened by Taoiseach Jack Lynch, President Hillery, President Mary Robinson, then Minister for Health and Children Micheál Martin TD, and the various Lord Mayors of Cork. On the opening of the 100th SHARE house, President Hillery said: "SHARE's achievements demonstrate a generosity and dedication on the part of young people which is an inspiration and challenge to us all". In 2002, the SHARE Day Care Centre was visited by President Mary McAleese. Later, in 2006, President McAleese acknowledged the work "which changed bad lives into good."

Each year since Br. Jerome's death, the Br. Jerome Lecture has been held in his honour, on social issues and the involvement of SHARE in the community. Guest speakers in the past have included Micheál Martin, Pat Cox and Taoiseach Bertie Ahern. The Taoiseach described the SHARE project as "a model of active citizenship", "character building" and "satisfying and empowering":

"None of this would have happened without the pioneering spirit, activism and leadership skills of Brother Jerome. He was, truly, a man who was ahead of his time. I think it is particularly appropriate that the Day Care Centre is named after him. Loneliness is itself a form of poverty and the Brother Jerome Kelly Day Care Centre and the social activities which the students organise around it do so much to alleviate this. Together, they bring a lot of joy to residents and visitors, which is a very fitting memorial to his life and work."

The work of SHARE has also received significant attention in both local, national and international media over the years. The British newspaper The Guardian described the project as "Imaginative, courageous and exciting", while Dick Cross of The Irish Independent labelled it as: "One of the most imaginative and practical projects ever undertaken in this country". Tom McSweeney of RTÉ said the "exciting venture by Cork's youth has brought new life to the old city", and similarly Padraigh O'Morain of The Irish Times described it as "one of Ireland's great success stories". In 2005, it was further acclaimed as a demonstration of "the magnificent generosity of the Cork people".

In 2007, the SHARE residents endorsed the organisation's 38th Christmas Fast & Fundraising Campaign. During part of the collection, eight members of the Executive sang a version of "Winter Wonderland" in Daunt Square for Irish radio station 2FM.
