= Mick Ryan (rugby union) =

Irish rugby union player

- Full name: Michael Ryan
- Born: 4 November 1869 Cashel, Co. Tipperary, Ireland
- Died: 19 August 1947 (aged 77) Cashel, Co. Tipperary, Ireland
- Notable relative: Jack Ryan (brother)

Rugby union career
- Position: Forward
International career
Years	Team	Apps	(Points)
1897–04	Ireland	17	(3)

Michael Ryan (4 November 1869 — 19 August 1947) was an Irish international rugby union player.

The son of a farmer, Ryan was born in Cashel, Co. Tipperary, and didn't begin playing rugby until his mid twenties, previously concentrating on athletics, football and hurling. He was a Gaelic footballer for Racecourse GAA. As a rugby player, Ryan was a strongly-built forward and played for Rockwell College. He was capped 17 times for Ireland from 1897 to 1904. Most of his international appearances were made with his brother Jack, including the 1899 triple crown.

Ryan was a rugby teammate and close friend of politician Éamon de Valera.

In 1947, Ryan was killed when he got struck by lightning while farming.

== See also ==
- List of Ireland national rugby union players
