= Leo Herbert Lehmann =

Irish Protestant minister

Leo Herbert Lehmann (December 6, 1895-June 19, 1950) was an Irish author, editor, and director of a Protestant ministry, Christ's Mission in New York. He was a priest in the Roman Catholic Church who later in life converted to Protestantism and served as the editor of The Converted Catholic Magazine. He authored magazine articles, books and pamphlets, condemning the programs and activities of the Roman Catholic Church.

== Educational background and priesthood ==
Lehmann was born in 1895 in Kingstown, County Dublin, Ireland, to Edmund and Emma Lehmann. He attended Mungret College in Limerick, and All Hallows College in Dublin. He was awarded advanced academic degrees in theology, including a Licentiate of Sacred Theology (STL) and Doctorate of Divinity (DD).

== Publications ==
- Behind the Dictators, Leo H. Lehmann, (New York: Agora Publishing Co., 1942)
- Vatican policy in the second world war, Leo H. Lehmann, (New York: Agora Publishing Co., 1945)
