= Niall Scannell =

Irish rugby union player

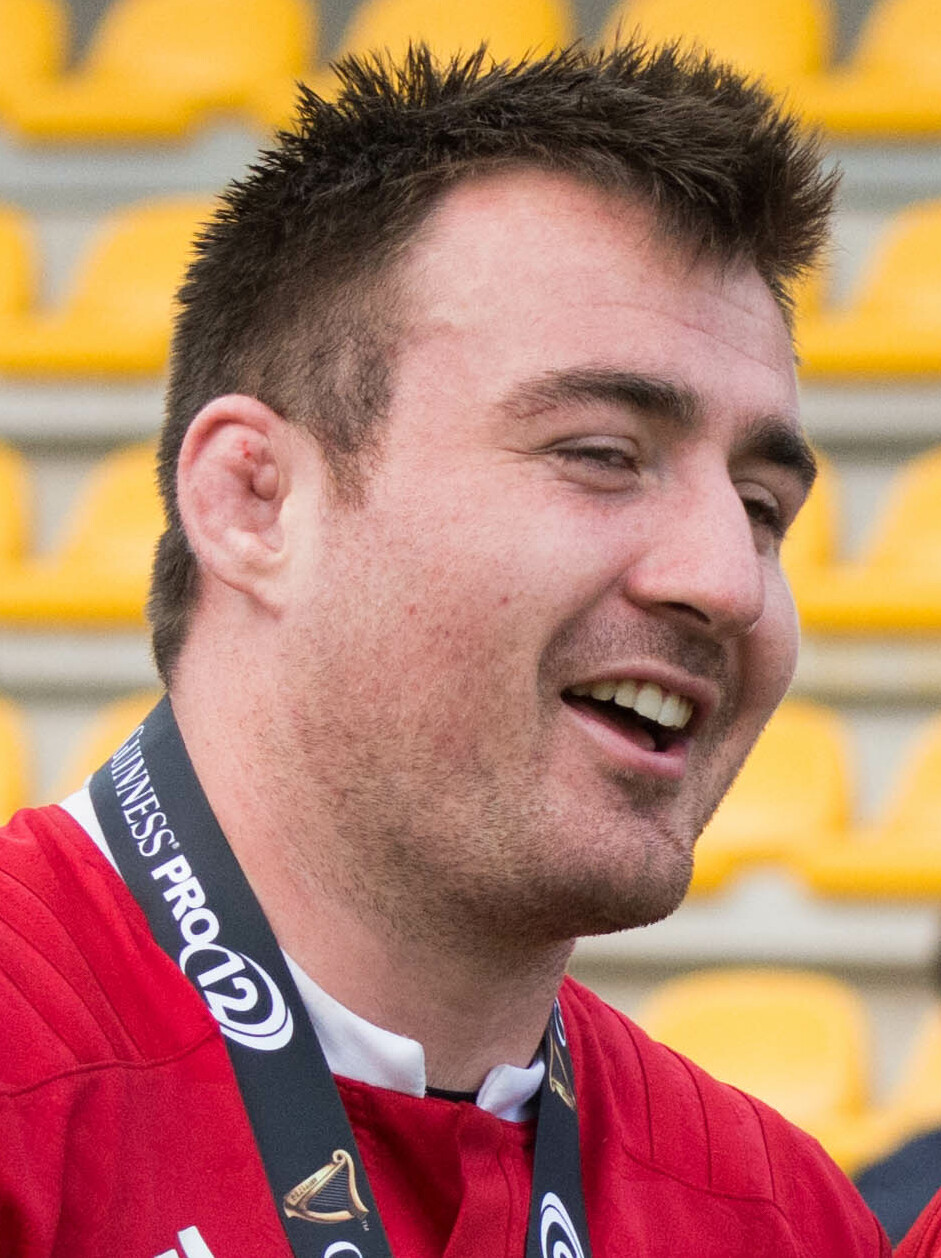
- Born: 8 April 1992 (age 34) Cork, Ireland
- Height: 1.85 m (6 ft 1 in)
- Weight: 111 kg (17.5 st; 245 lb)
- School: Presentation Brothers College
- University: University College Cork
- Notable relative(s): Rory Scannell (brother); Billy Scannell (brother); Jack O'Sullivan (cousin); Donal O'Sullivan (grandfather)

Rugby union career
- Position: Hooker
Amateur team(s)
Years	Team	Apps	(Points)
2010-16	Dolphin	59	(55)
Senior career
Years	Team	Apps	(Points)
2013–	Munster	211	(110)
- Correct as of 30 May 2026
International career
Years	Team	Apps	(Points)
2012	Ireland U20	8	(0)
2017–	Ireland	20	(5)
- Correct as of 19 October 2019

Niall Scannell (born 8 April 1992) is an Irish rugby union player who plays as a hooker for United Rugby Championship club Munster.

== Munster ==
Scannell secured a development contract with the senior Munster for the 2013–14 season in April 2013. He made his senior Munster debut on 21 December 2013, coming on as a replacement against Scarlets in the United Rugby Championship. Scannell made his first start for Munster on 27 December 2013, against Connacht. He signed a one-year development contract extension in March 2014. In March 2015, Scannell signed a two-year contract with Munster. Scannell made his European debut on 12 December 2015, starting against Leicester Tigers.

Scannell signed a contract extension with Munster in January 2017. On 25 April 2017, it was announced that Scannell had been nominated by his teammates for the 2017 Munster Rugby Senior Player of the Year, alongside John Ryan and Tyler Bleyendaal. He signed a two-year contract extension with Munster in December 2018.

Scannell earned his 100th cap for the province in their 39–22 defeat away to French club Racing 92 in round 5 of the 2019–20 Champions Cup on 12 January 2020, and he captained Munster for the first time in their 2019–20 Pro14 round 12 fixture away to Italian side Zebre on 21 February 2020, though Scannell left the field injured during the first-half of Munster's 28–0 win. A back injury Scannell sustained during training in October 2020 required surgery, ruling him out for two months. He signed a two-year contract extension with the province in February 2021.

Scannell featured off the bench in Munster's historic 28–14 win against a South Africa XV in Páirc Uí Chaoimh on 10 November 2022, and earned his 150th cap for Munster in their 17–6 away win against English club Northampton Saints in round two of the 2022–23 Champions Cup on 18 December 2022.

Scannell signed a two-year contract extension with the province in January 2023, and came on as a replacement in Munster's 19–14 win against the Stormers in the final of the 2022–23 United Rugby Championship on 27 May 2023.

On 27 September 2025, he made his 200th appearance for Munster in the 34-21 win against Scarlets in the opening round of the 2025–26 United Rugby Championship.

In March 2026, it was announced that Scannell would retire at the end of the 2025-26 season.

== Ireland ==
Scannell won a total of eight caps for the Ireland Under-20 team, playing in the 2012 Under-20 Six Nations Championship and captaining the team at the 2012 IRB Junior World Championship.

On 23 January 2017, Scannell was named in the Ireland squad for the opening two rounds of the 2017 Six Nations Championship. On 11 February 2017, Scannell made his debut for Ireland when, due to captain Rory Best's illness, he started against Italy in the Six Nations. Scannell was also selected in the squad for the 2017 Summer Tour against the United States and Japan. On 10 June 2017, in the one-off test against the United States, Scannell scored his first try for Ireland, doing so in the 55–19 win in the Red Bull Arena, New Jersey. When Scannell's brother Rory came on in the test as a replacement, they became the first Munster siblings to represent Ireland in the professional era. Having been called-up to replace captain Rory Best in Ireland's squad to tour Australia, Scannell went on to start in the second and third tests in Ireland's historic series victory.

Scannell was selected in the 31-man Ireland squad for the 2019 Rugby World Cup, having featured in the warm-up matches against Italy and Wales. During the World Cup itself, Scannell featured off the bench in Ireland's opening 27–3 win against Scotland and started in the 35–0 win against Russia, before again featuring off the bench in Ireland's 47–5 win against Samoa in their final pool game, and in the comprehensive 46–14 defeat against New Zealand in the quarter-finals, which brought an end to Ireland's 2019 World Cup.

Having been absent from new head coach Andy Farrell's squads since he took over post-2019 World Cup, Scannell was called up to the Ireland squad for the 2022 tour of New Zealand as injury cover for Rob Herring. Scannell had been on holiday when he received his call up, and three days later came off the bench in Ireland's uncapped match against the Māori All Blacks on 29 June, which the Māori won 32–17. Scannell also started in the second uncapped match against the Māori All Blacks on 12 July, which Ireland won 30–24 to draw the series 1–1.

== Honours ==
=== Munster ===
- United Rugby Championship
  - Winner (1): 2022–23

== Statistics ==
=== International analysis by opposition ===
Against	Played	Won	Lost	Drawn	Tries	Points	% Won
Australia	2	2	0	0	0	0	100
England	1	1	0	0	0	0	100
France	2	2	0	0	0	0	100
Italy	4	4	0	0	0	0	100
Japan	2	2	0	0	0	0	100
New Zealand	1	0	1	0	0	0	0
Russia	1	1	0	0	0	0	100
Samoa	1	1	0	0	0	0	100
Scotland	1	1	0	0	0	0	100
United States	2	2	0	0	1	5	100
Wales	3	1	2	0	0	0	33.33
Total	20	17	3	0	1	5	85

Correct as of 19 October 2019
