= Munster Schools Junior Cup =

Rugby union competition in Ireland

The Munster Schools Junior Cup or Munster Junior Cup is the under-age rugby union competition for schools affiliated to the Munster Branch of the IRFU with team members under 16 years of age.

The competition has been traditionally dominated by Cork city's major rugby playing schools P.B.C. claiming the most titles (32)and C.B.C. with 19 titles. The County Tipperary school Rockwell College has won 20 titles, with the remaining titles (23 in all), won by mostly Limerick schools with the exception of one West Cork school, Bandon Grammar School. The Limerick wins are largely due to contributions from Crescent College (Note: Although the school has always been referred to as Crescent College, its official name was Sacred Heart College SJ up until the 1970s, when it became a comprehensive school. Since then its official name has been Crescent College Comprehensive SJ) and St. Munchin's with seven victories respectively.

== Top winners ==
	Team	Winner	Winning Years
1	Presentation Brothers College, Cork	32	1933, 1944, 1945, 1946, 1951, 1954, 1957, 1960, 1963, 1964, 1965, 1966, 1973, 1976, 1977, 1979, 1980, 1983, 1984, 1985, 1986, 1988, 1992, 1995, 2000, 2002, 2007, 2009, 2014, 2022, 2023, 2024
2	Rockwell College Cashel	20	1934, 1935, 1936, 1937, 1942, 1943, 1947, 1948, 1949, 1955, 1956, 1958, 1959, 1967, 1968, 1972, 1974, 1982, 1997, 2019
3	Christian Brothers College	19	1938, 1953, 1962, 1969, 1971, 1975, 1978, 1981, 1990, 1994, 1996, 1999, 2001, 2004, 2006, 2012, 2015, 2017, 2020 (shared)
4	St. Munchin's College Limerick	8	1970, 1987, 1989, 1993, 1998, 2018, 2020 (shared), 2026
5	Crescent College Limerick	7	1950, 1952, 1961, 1991, 2010, 2011, 2016
6	Mungret College Limerick	3	1939, 1940, 1941
6	Ardscoil Rís, Limerick	2	2003, 2005
6	Castletroy College Limerick	2	2008, 2013
7	Limerick CBS	1	1932
8	Bandon Grammar School	1	2025

== Honours ==
=== 1930s ===
- 1932 Limerick CBS
- 1933 Presentation Brothers College
- 1934 Rockwell College beat Christian Brothers College
- 1935 Rockwell College
- 1936 Rockwell College
- 1937 Rockwell College
- 1938 Christian Brothers College
- 1939 Mungret College

=== 1940s ===
- 1940 Mungret College beat Christian Brothers College
- 1941 Mungret College
- 1942 Rockwell College
- 1943 Rockwell College
- 1944 Presentation Brothers College
- 1945 Presentation Brothers College beat Crescent College
- 1946 Presentation Brothers College
- 1947 Rockwell College
- 1948 Rockwell College
- 1949 Rockwell College

=== 1950s ===
- 1950 Crescent College
- 1951 Presentation Brothers College beat Christian Brothers College
- 1952 Crescent College
- 1953 Christian Brothers College
- 1954 Presentation Brothers College
- 1955 Rockwell College
- 1956 Rockwell College
- 1957 Presentation Brothers College
- 1958 Rockwell College
- 1959 Rockwell College

=== 1960s ===
- 1960 Presentation Brothers College Beat Christian Brothers College
- 1961 Crescent College beat Mungret College
- 1962 Christian Brothers College
- 1963 Presentation Brothers College
- 1964 Presentation Brothers College beat Waterpark College
- 1965 Presentation Brothers College beat Rockwell College
- 1966 Presentation Brothers College beat St. Munchin's College
- 1967 Rockwell College
- 1968 Rockwell College beat St. Munchin's College
- 1969 Christian Brothers College

=== 1970s ===
- 1970 St. Munchin's College beat Christian Brothers College
- 1971 Christian Brothers College
- 1972 Rockwell College
- 1973 Presentation Brothers College
- 1974 Rockwell College
- 1975 Christian Brothers College
- 1976 Presentation Brothers College
- 1977 Presentation Brothers College
- 1978 Christian Brothers College
- 1979 Presentation Brothers College

=== 1980s ===
- 1980 Presentation Brothers College
- 1981 Christian Brothers College beat Crescent College
- 1982 Rockwell College beat Christian Brothers College 3-0 after a replay, drop goal by Peter O'Donoghue at outside centre deep in the second half. First match 0–0 at Thomond Park.
- 1983 Presentation Brothers College beat Crescent College
- 1984 Presentation Brothers College beat Rockwell College
- 1985 Presentation Brothers College
- 1986 Presentation Brothers College beat Crescent College 22-11
- 1987 St. Munchin's College beat Crescent College10-3
- 1988 Presentation Brothers College beat Crescent College
- 1989 St. Munchin's College beat Crescent College

=== 1990s ===
- 1990 Christian Brothers College
- 1991 Crescent College beat Christian Brothers College
- 1992 Presentation Brothers College beat St. Munchin's College 3-0 after a replay in Thomond Park, drop goal by Ronan O'Gara with 5 minutes remaining in the second half. First match 0–0 at Musgrave Park. First PBC double since successive doubles in 1965 and 1966.
- 1993 St. Munchin's College beat Presentation Brothers College
- 1994 Christian Brothers College beat Presentation Brothers College
- 1995 Presentation Brothers College beat Ardscoil Rís
- 1996 Christian Brothers College beat St. Munchin's College
- 1997 Rockwell College beat Crescent College 9-5
- 1998 St. Munchin's College beat Presentation Brothers College
- 1999 Christian Brothers College beat Rockwell College 32-0

=== 2000s ===
- 2000 Presentation Brothers College beat Christian Brothers College
- 2001 Christian Brothers College beat Rockwell College
- 2002 Presentation Brothers College beat Crescent College
- 2003 Ardscoil Rís beat Presentation Brothers College
- 2004 Christian Brothers College beat Ardscoil Rís
- 2005 Ardscoil Rís defeated Christian Brothers College
- 2006 Christian Brothers College beat St. Munchin's College
- 2007 Presentation Brothers College beat Castletroy College
- 2008 Castletroy College beat Presentation Brothers College 22-15
- 2009 Presentation Brothers College beat St. Munchin's College 20-3

=== 2010s ===
- 2010 Crescent College defeated Christian Brothers College 17-13
- 2011 Crescent College defeated Ard Scoil Ris 22-3
- 2012 Christian Brothers College defeated Ard Scoil Ris 18 - 6
- 2013 Castletroy College defeated Crescent College 13-7
- 2014 Presentation Brothers College defeated Crescent College 17-12
- 2015 Christian Brothers College defeated Crescent College 22-10
- 2016Crescent College defeated Christian Brothers College 17-7
- 2017Christian Brothers College defeated Crescent College 21-19
- 2018 St Munchins College defeated Christian Brothers College 15-10
- 2019 Rockwell College defeated St Munchins College 23-12

=== 2020s ===
- 2020 St Munchins College & Christian Brothers College Shared due to Global Pandemic
- 2022 Presentation Brothers College defeated Christian Brothers College 14-10
- 2023 Presentation Brothers College defeated Ardscoil Rís 20-8
- 2024 Presentation Brothers College defeated Christian Brothers College 19-14
- 2025 Bandon Grammar School defeated Christian Brothers College 20-12 in Virgin Media Park.
- 2026 St Munchins College defeated Christian Brothers College 26-5 (Replay)
