= Munster Schools Rugby Senior Cup =

Rugby competition for Munster schools; alternates venues

The Munster Schools Senior Cup or Munster Senior Cup (also known as the Pinergy Schools Boys Senior Cup for sponsorship reasons) is the under-age rugby union competition for schools affiliated to the Munster Branch of the IRFU. The trophy is named after Garrett Fitzgerald, former CBC coach, Munster coach and Munster CEO.

The inaugural Munster Schools Senior Cup was held in 1909, and since then, two all-boys schools in Cork city have been prominent as the only rugby-playing schools in the city. Presentation Brothers College (PBC) hold the record for the most titles with 33 while their great rivals, Christian Brothers College (CBC) have won the tournament 32 times. Rockwell College (with 26 titles) were once the team to beat in the competition, holding the record for most wins until the 1980s. However, Rockwell have only won the cup five times since.

Limerick CBS (4) won Limerick's first trophies in the 1920s and 1930s, followed by Crescent College Comprehensive (12) which contributed three in the 1940s and 1950s, whilst St. Munchin's (5) won their first in 1968. Mungret College, which merged into Crescent College in 1974, also won the trophy once in 1941. In addition Ardscoil Rís and St. Enda's have competed in finals.

The competition's final generally takes place every year around Saint Patrick's Day, and alternates between being played in Thomond Park or Musgrave Park, unless there are two teams from one city playing; in that case, the game takes place in that city.

== Standing ==
Schools rugby is seen by the IRFU as one of the two channels for players to learn their rugby and advance to senior levels.

Many players that have taken part in (and won) the Senior cup have gone on to represent Munster and Ireland. Former winners of the Cup include:, Ronan O'Gara (PBC), Peter Stringer (PBC), Simon Zebo (PBC), Peter O'Mahony (PBC), David Wallace (CCC), Donnacha Ryan (St. Munchin's), Conor Murray (St. Munchin's), Keith Earls (St. Munchin's), Jerry Flannery (St. Munchin's) and Paul O'Connell (Ardscoil Rís) also played Senior Cup rugby for their respective schools.

== Winners ==
	Team	Titles	Winning Years (Bold denotes winning Snr/Jnr Cup Double)
1	Presentation Brothers College, Cork	33	1918, 1920, 1927, 1932, 1935, 1939, **1945**, **1946**, 1948, 1952, **1954**, **1957**, 1958, **1965**, **1966**, 1969, 1975, 1978, 1981, 1987, 1991, **1992**, 1993, **1995**, 1996, 2005, **2007**, 2010, 2017, 2020 (shared), **2023**, 2024, 2026
2	Christian Brothers College, Cork	32	1909, 1913, 1916, 1919, 1922, 1924, 1925, 1936, 1943, 1944, 1956, **1962**, **1971**, 1972, 1973, 1974, 1976, 1977, 1979, 1980, 1984, 1988, 1997, 1998, **1999**, 2000, 2003, 2009, 2016, 2019, **2020** (shared), 2025
3	Rockwell College, Cashel	26	1910, 1911, 1912, 1914, 1915, 1917, 1928, 1929, 1930, **1937**, 1940, **1942**, 1950, 1953, **1955**, **1959**, 1960, 1961, 1964, **1967**, 1970, 1985, 2001, 2011, 2012, 2015
4	Crescent College, Limerick	12	1947, 1949, 1951, 1963, 1983, 1986, 1989, 1990, 1994, 2013, 2014, 2022
5	St. Munchin's College, Limerick	5	1968, 1982, 2002, 2004, 2006
6	Limerick CBS	4	1926, 1931, 1933, 1934
7	The Abbey, Tipperary	1	1921
7	P.B.C. Cobh	1	1938
7	Mungret College, Limerick	1	**1941**
7	Castletroy College, Limerick	1	**2008**
7	Glenstal Abbey School, Limerick	1	2018

== Honours ==
=== 1900s ===
- 1909 Christian Brothers College beat Rockwell College

=== 1910s ===
- 1910 Rockwell College
- 1911 Rockwell College
- 1912 Rockwell College
- 1913 Christian Brothers College
- 1914 Rockwell College
- 1915 Rockwell College
- 1916 Christian Brothers College
- 1917 Rockwell College
- 1918 Presentation Brothers College
- 1919 Christian Brothers College

=== 1920s ===
- 1920 Presentation Brothers College
- 1921 The Abbey, Tipperary
- 1922 Christian Brothers College
- 1923 Competition cancelled as only one school entered
- 1924 Christian Brothers College
- 1925 Christian Brothers College
- 1926 Limerick CBS
- 1927 Presentation Brothers College
- 1928 Rockwell College
- 1929 Rockwell College

=== 1930s ===
- 1930 Rockwell College beat Presentation Brothers College
- 1931 Limerick CBS
- 1932 Presentation Brothers College
- 1933 Limerick CBS
- 1934 Limerick CBS
- 1935 Presentation Brothers College, Cork
- 1936 Christian Brothers College
- 1937 Rockwell College beat Presentation Brothers College
- 1938 Presentation Brothers College, Cobh beat Presentation Brothers College
- 1939 Presentation Brothers College

=== 1940s ===
- 1940 Rockwell College beat Presentation Brothers College
- 1941 Mungret College
- 1942 Rockwell College
- 1943 Christian Brothers College
- 1944 Christian Brothers College beat Rockwell College
- 1945 Presentation Brothers College
- 1946 Presentation Brothers College
- 1947 Crescent College beat Presentation Brothers College
- 1948 Presentation Brothers College
- 1949 Crescent College beat Rockwell College

=== 1950s ===
- 1950 Rockwell College beat Mungret College
- 1951 Crescent College beat St. Munchin's
- 1952 Presentation Brothers College
- 1953 Rockwell College
- 1954 Presentation Brothers College
- 1955 Rockwell College
- 1956 Christian Brothers College
- 1957 Presentation Brothers College beat Crescent College
- 1958 Presentation Brothers College
- 1959 Rockwell College

=== 1960s ===
- 1960 Rockwell College beat Presentation Brothers College
- 1961 Rockwell College beat Christian Brothers College
- 1962 Christian Brothers College beat Rockwell College
- 1963 Crescent College
- 1964 Rockwell College beat Christian Brothers College
- 1965 Presentation Brothers College beat Crescent College
- 1966 Presentation Brothers College beat Rockwell College
- 1967 Rockwell College
- 1968 St. Munchin's beat Rockwell College
- 1969 Presentation Brothers College

=== 1970s ===
- 1970 Rockwell College beat Glenstal
- 1971 Christian Brothers College beat St. Munchin's
- 1972 Christian Brothers College beat St. Munchin's
- 1973 Christian Brothers College beat Rockwell College
- 1974 Christian Brothers College beat Presentation Brothers College
- 1975 Presentation Brothers College beat Rockwell College
- 1976 Christian Brothers College beat Presentation Brothers College
- 1977 Christian Brothers College beat Presentation Brothers College
- 1978 Presentation Brothers College beat Christian Brothers College
- 1979 Christian Brothers College beat Presentation Brothers College

=== 1980s ===
- 1980 Christian Brothers College beat Presentation Brothers College
- 1981 Presentation Brothers College beat Christian Brothers College
- 1982 St. Munchin's beat Presentation Brothers College
- 1983 Crescent College beat Presentation Brothers College, Cork
- 1984 Christian Brothers College beat Crescent College
- 1985 Rockwell College beat Christian Brothers College
- 1986 Crescent College beat Christian Brothers College
- 1987 Presentation Brothers College beat St. Enda's
- 1988 Christian Brothers College beat St. Enda's
- 1989 Crescent College beat Christian Brothers College 12-9

=== 1990s ===
- 1990 Crescent College beat Rockwell College
- 1991 Presentation Brothers College beat Rockwell College 4 - 0
- 1992 Presentation Brothers College beat St. Munchin's 14 - 3
- 1993 Presentation Brothers College beat St. Munchin's
- 1994 Crescent College beat Presentation Brothers College
- 1995 Presentation Brothers College beat Crescent College 14 - 7
- 1996 Presentation Brothers College beat Ardscoil Rís
- 1997 Christian Brothers College beat St. Munchin's
- 1998 Christian Brothers College beat Presentation Brothers College
- 1999 Christian Brothers College beat St. Munchin's

=== 2000s ===
- 2000 Christian Brothers College beat Rockwell College 25–18
- 2001 Rockwell College beat St. Munchin's 17 - 5
- 2002 St. Munchin's beat Presentation Brothers College 20–19
- 2003 Christian Brothers College beat Presentation Brothers College 11–8
- 2004 St. Munchin's beat Presentation Brothers College 11–10
- 2005 Presentation Brothers College beat Christian Brothers College 6–3
- 2006 St. Munchin's beat Presentation Brothers College 7–3
- 2007 Presentation Brothers College beat Christian Brothers College 13–3
- 2008 Castletroy College beat Christian Brothers College 21–15
- 2009 Christian Brothers College beat Rockwell College 33–19

=== 2010s ===
- 2010 Presentation Brothers College beat Rockwell College 22–10
- 2011 Rockwell College beat Presentation Brothers College 9–3
- 2012 Rockwell College beat St. Munchin's 6–5
- 2013 Crescent College Comprehensive beat Rockwell College 27–5
- 2014 Crescent College Comprehensive beat Ardscoil Rís 21–7
- 2015 Rockwell College beat Ardscoil Rís 23–13
- 2016 Christian Brothers College beat Crescent College Comprehensive 9–8
- 2017 Presentation Brothers College beat Glenstal Abbey 11–3
- 2018 Glenstal Abbey beat Christian Brothers College 18–17
- 2019 Christian Brothers College beat Presentation Brothers College 5–3

=== 2020s ===
- 2020 Presentation Brothers College and Christian Brothers College (Final scratched and title shared due to COVID-19 pandemic)
- 2021 Competition cancelled due to COVID-19 pandemic
- 2022 Crescent College Comprehensive beat Presentation Brothers College 26–5
- 2023 Presentation Brothers College beat Christians Brothers College 24-0
- 2024 Presentation Brothers College beat Christians Brothers College 33-31
- 2025 Christian Brothers College beat Presentation Brothers College 17-10
- 2026 Presentation Brothers College beat St. Munchin's 51-3

== See also ==
- Munster Rugby
- Munster Schools Junior Cup
- Connacht Schools Senior Cup
- Leinster Schools Senior Cup
- Ulster Schools Senior Cup
- Ireland national schoolboy rugby union team
