= Jack Ryan (rugby union) =

Irish rugby union player

- Full name: John Jo Ryan
- Born: 9 June 1873 Knockavilla, County Tipperary
- Died: 24 October 1937 (aged 64)
- Notable relative: Mick Ryan (brother)

Rugby union career
- Position: Forward
International career
Years	Team	Apps	(Points)
1897–04	Ireland	14	(3)

John Jo Ryan was an Irish international rugby union player.

A native of Cashel, County Tipperary, Ryan was capped 14 times as a forward for Ireland between 1897 and 1904, which included their 1899 Home Nations triple crown, alongside his brother Mick Ryan.

Ryan bred the 1928 Grand National–winning horse Tipperary Tim. He was in the mid-Atlantic Ocean en route to the United States when he found out that his horse had won the race, having been one of only two that was able to complete the course. At 100–1 odds, this gave Ryan a good return on his £5 bet.

== See also ==
- List of Ireland national rugby union players
