= Presentation Brothers College, Cork =

Private school for boys in Cork City, Ireland

PBC Cork

Location
- Mardyke, Cork; Ireland; 51.8976°N 08.4851°W

Information
- Other names: Irish: Coláiste na Toirbhirte and Pres
- Type: private, fee paying
- Motto: Viriliter Age (“Act Courageously ”)
- Religious affiliation: Roman Catholic
- Established: 1878
- Principal: David Barry
- Gender: Boys
- Enrolment: 720, approx. (120 per year group)
- Colors: Black White and Purple
- Website: https://www.pbc-cork.ie/

A Pres student collecting outside the Crib in Daunt Square, as part of the 2006 SHARE Fast.

Presentation Brothers College (PBC Cork) (Irish: Coláiste na Toirbhirte; colloquially known as Pres) is a Catholic, boys, private fee-paying secondary school in Cork, Ireland. As of 2020, Presentation Brothers College was ranked as the top boys secondary school in Ireland and regularly places first in the annual top performing schools table rankings conducted by The Irish Times. In recent years it has also been ranked as one of the top rugby playing schools in Munster, winning the Rugby school of the year award in 2023 and 2024.

== History ==
The college was founded by the Presentation Brothers in 1878, in the South Mall. Soon afterwards it moved to the Grand Parade and, in 1887, to the Western Road. In 1985, the college moved to a new building on the Mardyke on the site of the college's rugby facilities; the Western Road premises is now owned and used by UCC. The college has developed new rugby facilities at Dennehy's Cross and has its own rowing club and boathouse located on the Marina.

In 1969, Jerome Kelly returned home from missionary work in the West Indies and was appointed principal of the college. He organised a series of workshops, in which the students of Presentation College were encouraged to think globally and act locally:

"Imbuing teenagers with a sense of responsibility and social consciousness is a vital part of any education, and it was with this in mind that Brother Jerome sent his senior Pres students out to walk the streets of Cork..."

The result was the founding of the charity Students Harness Aid for the Relief of the Elderly in 1970. SHARE expanded and now includes pupils from other secondary schools in Cork city.

In 2005, the Preslink organisation was founded in the school; a group of junior students whose stated aim is to forge links with other Presentation Brothers communities. In 2006, the organisation received an "Edmund Rice Award", which recognises groups that work to improve the lives of others.

In November 2009, ownership of the school, along with seven other Presentation Brothers schools in Ireland, was handed over to a group of lay trustees

It is one of the few private fee paying schools in Cork.

== Curriculum ==
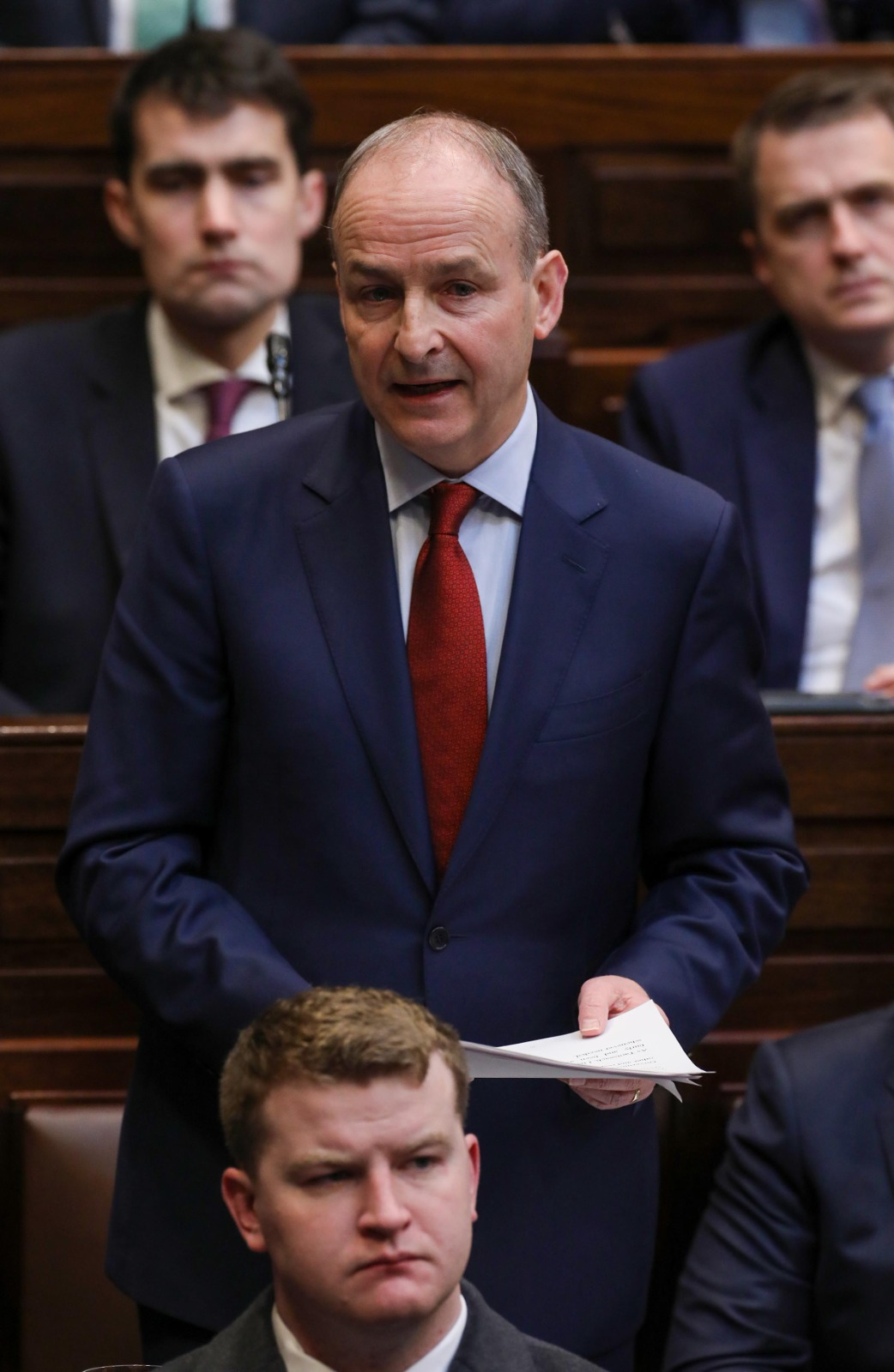
Mícheál Martin TD, incumbent Taoiseach and former teacher at PBC

The school offers both the Junior and Leaving Certificate cycles. The current curriculum teaches first years religion; Irish as L2; English as L1; mathematics; Latin; French as L2; German as L2; science; business studies; history; geography; CSPE; SPHE; art; social education; ICT and physical education. In second year, the students may choose to drop two of the L2 foreign languages and choose between art and geography. From second year onwards, students do not study social education or ICT. Unusually for a private school, streaming is not used until third year.

After completing the Junior Certificate, the college requires students to complete a mandatory Transition Year. In fifth year, students begin the Leaving Cert cycle. At the Leaving Certificate level, the college offers a wide range of courses. Irish as L2, English L1 and mathematics are compulsory. One language must be taken from French as L2, German as L2 and Latin. Any three optional subjects may be taken from the sciences (physics, chemistry, biology, agricultural), the businesses (business studies, accounting, economics), history, art, applied mathematics, geography, politics and society, physical education and religion.

== Rugby ==
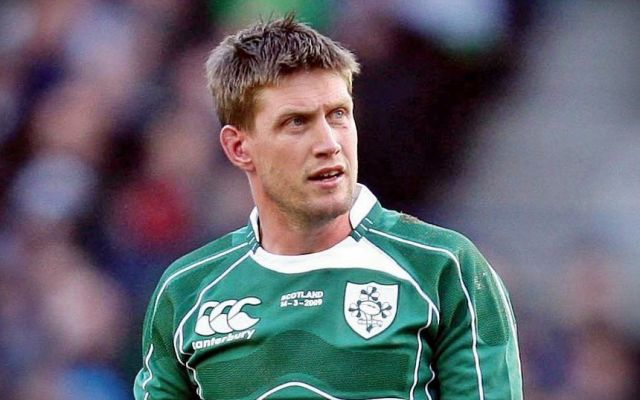
Ronan O'Gara, past pupil of PBC

The college sport is rugby union. As of 2024, the college has won 33 Senior Schools Cups and 32 Junior Schools Cups respectively, and has produced 22 Irish Rugby Internationals. In 2007, the school won both the Senior Schools Cup and the Junior Schools Cup (the first time they had won both in the same year since 1995, when Ronan O'Gara was the Senior Captain). Six players have played for the Lions - Tom Kiernan (1962 & Captain in 1968 ), Jerry Walsh (1966), Michael Kiernan (1983), Ronan O'Gara (2001, 2005 & 2009), Simon Zebo (2013) and Peter O'Mahony (2017).

In March 2014, PBC won the Junior Schools Cup for the first time in five years in a 17–12 win over Crescent.

The school participates in a number of Munster under-age School-Boy competitions: McCarthy Cup A, B & B Schools (U-15), The Junior Schools Cup (U-16), The Kidney Cup (Junior B), The Bowen Shield & B Schools (U-18), The Barry Cup (Senior B), and The Senior Schools Cup (U-19). Pres have won every cup at some point and several teams have won every competition.

The school playing fields are located at Dennehy's Cross, Wilton. There are 4 pitches, one walled and one flood-lit.

== Extra-curricular activities and sport ==
=== Drama ===
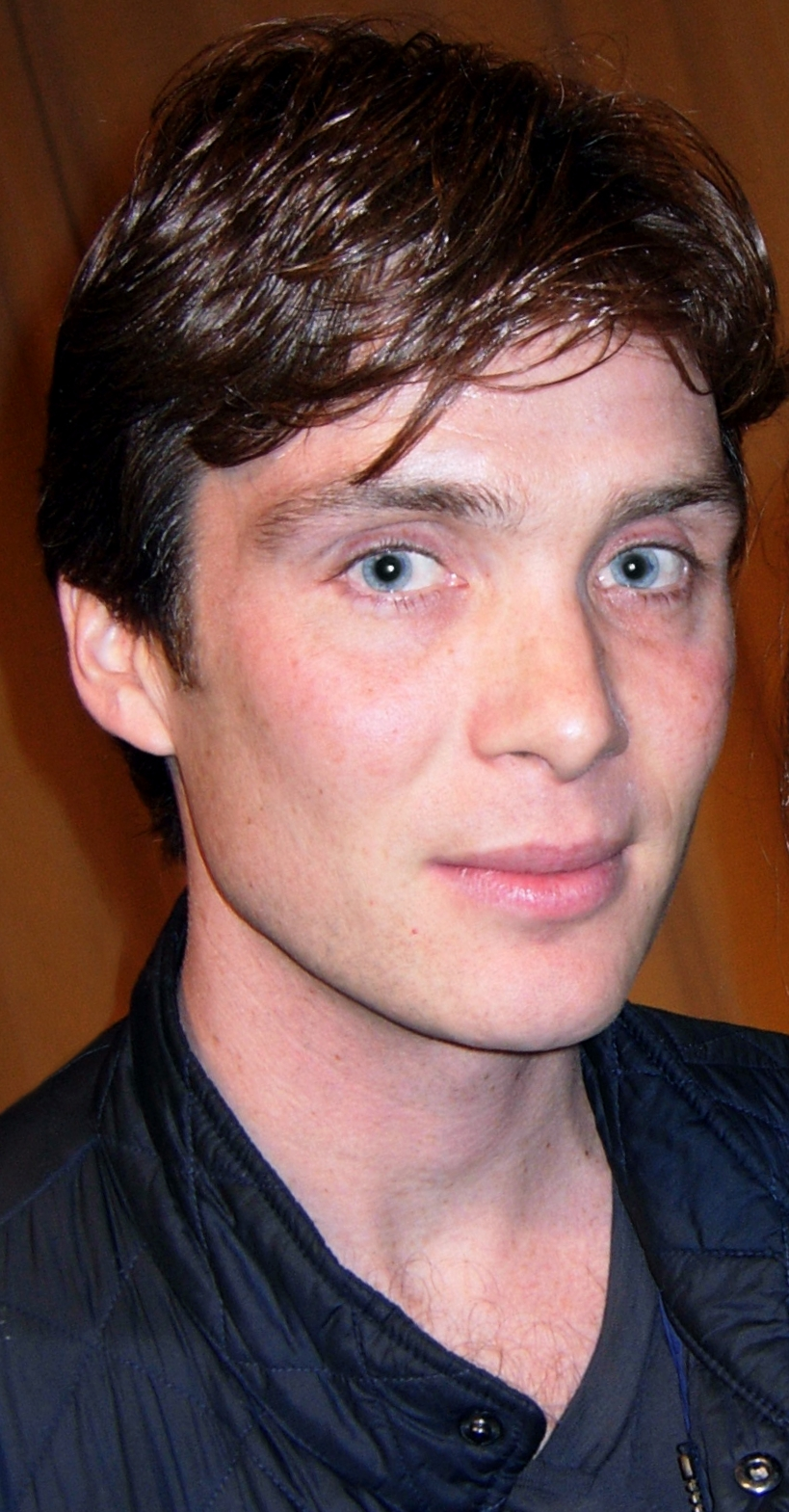
Actor Cillian Murphy is a past pupil

The college drama society performs one production of a dramatic play annually. This is very often the play studied by Leaving Cert students of that academic year. Previous productions have included Sive (2013) and All My Sons (2014).

=== Sciences ===
In 2012, three students were invited to partake in the European Science and Maths Olympiad, based on their Junior Certificate results in Maths and Science. These students participated in the Olympiad in DCU. In 2004, the Pres team won the first Cork Robotics Competition for Schools, which was launched by the Cork Electronics Industry Association (CEIA) at the National Software Centre in Mahon Point.

=== Rowing ===
PBC has had a number of students who have been members of the various Cork rowing clubs since 1890, some of whom have won Irish Championships with these clubs but never as Pres College Rowing Club. In 1985, the Presentation College Rowing Club was registered officially for the first time with the Irish Amateur Rowing Union and began rowing out of Shandon Boat Club on the Marina. The first equipment used was bought second-hand from Dungarvan Rowing Club. In its existence to date, the club was a tenant of Shandon Boat Club, Cork Boat Club and Lee Rowing Club, but has subsequently constructed its own boathouse, located to the east of Lee RC on the Marina The club owns a selection of modern racing boats consisting of 5 eights, 8 fours, 4 pairs and 9 single sculls, together with a large selection of rowing blades, coaching launches and a boat trailer.

=== Other sports ===
Other sports played at the college include basketball, GAA, soccer and golf. The school has won the GAA Lord Mayor's Cup five times in the last six years. The school golf team has also won the Cork County Championship consecutively in 2006 and 2007. PBC reached the All-Ireland basketball U-16s cup final for the first time in 2009 and defeated St. Columbs college from Derry to win PBC's first ever All-Ireland. The school has also won several soccer titles, including Cork Cups at First Year, Minor, Junior and Senior level. In February 2015, PBC won the Munster Schools Senior Cup.

== Selected alumni ==
=== Business ===
- Ben Dunne, businessman

=== Law ===
- Liam McKechnie, Justice of the Supreme Court of Ireland

=== Media ===
- Michael Clifford, author and investigative journalist
- Cathal Coughlan, singer, songwriter and keyboard player in the bands The Fatima Mansions and Microdisney
- Eoghan Harris, journalist and former politician
- George Hook, journalist
- Fergal Keane, BBC television journalist/author
- David Marcus, novelist and literary editor
- Cillian Murphy, Oscar winning actor
- Seán Ó Faoláin, author and short story writer

=== Politics ===
- Daniel Corkery, writer, Professor of English at UCC and Senator.
- Barry Desmond, former Minister for Health and Minister for Social Welfare.
- Fergus Finlay, political adviser, author and journalist.
- Gene Fitzgerald, TD, Minister for Labour, Minister for the Public Service and Minister for Finance.
- Gerald Goldberg, solicitor and first Jewish Lord Mayor of Cork.
- Eoghan Harris, former Senator (Ireland) and columnist
- Michael O'Leary, former Tánaiste, former leader of the Labour Party, former Fine Gael TD.

=== Rugby ===
- Michael Bradley capped 40 times for Ireland Rugby Union, 15 times as captain, current coach at Edinburgh
- Marney Cunningham, former Irish Rugby Union International and catholic priest
- Alex Kendellan, Munster player
- Declan Kidney, former head coach of the Irish national rugby team and former head coach of the Munster rugby team
- Mike Kiernan, former Irish Rugby Union International and British and Irish Lions team member
- Tom Kiernan, Irish Rugby Union International and British and Irish Lions team member.
- Mick O'Driscoll, former Irish Rugby Union International.
- Ronan O'Gara, former Irish Rugby Union International and British and Irish Lions team member.
- Peter O'Mahony, former Irish Rugby Union International and British and Irish Lions team member.
- Niall Scannell, current Munster Rugby squad member
- Rory Scannell, current Munster Rugby squad member
- Frankie Sheahan, former Irish Rugby Union International.
- Peter Stringer, former Irish Rugby Union International.
- Jerry Walsh, former Irish Rugby Union International and British and Irish Lions team member
- Simon Zebo, former Irish Rugby Union International.

=== Other sport ===
- Alan Bennett, Cork City FC and Ireland soccer player
- John Browne, holder of three All-Ireland Hurling medals (1999, 2004 & 2005)
- Noel Cantwell, former Irish Football Captain, and captain of the 1963 FA Cup winners.
- Brian Clifford, swimmer, competed in the men's 1500 metre freestyle at the 1972 Summer Olympics. He was still a pupil at Pres at the time
- Eoin Cotter Gaelic footballer, All-Ireland Football medal winner 2010
- Ben Cunnigham, Cork two time Under-20 All-Ireland Hurling medalist
- Dick Fitzgerald Gaelic footballer & Winner of five All-Ireland Football medals, Fitzgerald Stadium in Kerry is named after him
- Brian Hayes, Cork hurler and All-Ireland Under-20 Hurling medalist
- Caoimhín Kelleher, Brentford F.C. goalkeeper.
- Brian Lenihan, former Cork City FC, Hull City FC and Ireland soccer player
- Jack Short, cricketer for Ireland from 1974–1984
- Ethan Twomey, Cork hurler and All-Ireland Under-20 Hurling medalist

== Notable staff ==
- Jim Corr, TD and Lord Mayor of Cork.
- Micheál Martin, Taoiseach
- Pádraig Ó Caoimh, Irish soldier and long-time administrator of the Gaelic Athletic Association (GAA). Páirc Uí Chaoimh, the home of the Cork GAA, is named after him.
- William Wall, novelist, poet and short story
