= Sexual abuse scandal in the Roman Catholic Diocese of Limerick =

Sexual abuse cases in Ireland

This article summarizes allegations and investigations of child sexual abuse by clergymen in the Roman Catholic Diocese of Limerick, Ireland.

== Allegations against 10 priests since 1960 ==
According to the Irish Times, allegations have been made against 10 priests since 1960. Three are now deceased and one case is before the courts. The DPP has decided not to proceed with two other cases. There have been no convictions. The diocese says no priest under investigation is in active ministry.

=== Denis Daly affair ===
It was alleged that Peter McCloskey was repeatedly raped by Fr Denis Daly, since deceased, in the Caherdavin parish between 1980 and 1981. In 2006, the victim died two days after a mediation meeting with Dr Donal Murray and his legal team.

== Diocesan policy against abuse ==
The Limerick diocese had adopted child protection guidelines in accordance with the standards named in the National Board for Safeguarding Children document. Its goal is to properly share information about concerns with the relevant agencies and involving parents and children. The diocese has also hosted conferences on the importance of preventing abuse.

In 2012 the Diocese of Limerick released a (NBSCCCI) safeguarding report that found the diocese in compliance with forty-four out of forty-eight criteria, and partially in compliance with the other four.

== Fallout in Limerick over the Murphy Report ==
The Murphy Report found that bishop Donal Murray did not deal properly with the suspicions and concerns that were expressed to him in relation to Fr Naughton during his time in Dublin, and described his actions - or lack of - as "inexcusable".

Although the bishop was pressured to resign from his post, he insisted he was not involved in any cover up. He began a listening process with his parishioners as regards his future position in the diocese. He could not say if he expects to say Mass in St John's Cathedral this Christmas Day.

== Bishop finally resigns ==
Bishop Murray informed the Vicars General of the Diocese on the afternoon of Tuesday 1 December 2009 of his decision to offer his resignation. On Wednesday 2 December, he contacted the Apostolic Nuncio, asking him to arrange a meeting with the Congregation for Bishops in Rome. This meeting took place on Monday 7 December.

He announced his decision to a congregation, including priests of the Diocese, people working in the Diocesan Office and the Diocesan Pastoral Centre, at 11 a.m. (noon in Rome, the hour of the publication of the decision) in St. John's Cathedral, Limerick.

== See also ==
- Child sexual abuse
- Religious abuse
- Sexual abuse
- Sexual misconduct
- Spiritual abuse
