= Donal O'Sullivan (Gaelic footballer) =

Gaelic football player and GAA administrator

Dónal O'Sullivan
Personal information
- Native name: Dónall Ó Súilleabháin (Irish)
- Nickname: Ted
- Born: 31 December 1930 Beara, County Cork, Ireland
- Died: 30 August 2001 (aged 70) Douglas, Cork, Ireland
- Occupation: Local government official
- Height: 6 ft 2 in (188 cm)

Sport
- Sport: Gaelic football
- Position: Full-back
Club
- Years: Club
- Lees
Club titles
- Cork titles: 1
College
- Years: College
- University College Cork
College titles
- Sigerson titles: 0
Inter-county
Years	County	Apps (scores)
1955-1957	Cork	8 (0-00)
Inter-county titles
- Munster titles: 2
- All-Irelands: 0
- NFL: 1

Donal O'Sullivan (31 December 1930 – 30 August 2001) was an Irish Gaelic footballer who played at club level with Lees and at inter-county level with the Cork senior football team. He usually lined out as a full-back. O'Sullivan, who is regarded as one of Cork's all-time greatest players, also served as a Gaelic Athletic Association administrator at county and inter-provincial levels.

Born in Cork, O'Sullivan was the son of Timothy O'Sullivan, a Fianna Fáil TD and Senator. His early football career included several seasons with University College Cork in the Sigerson Cup and with the Lees club with whom he won a Cork Senior Championship medal as captain in 1955.

O'Sullivan was later appointed captain of the Cork senior football team, leading the team to National League and Munster Championship successes in 1956. He also captained Cork to that year's All-Ireland final defeat by Galway. O'Sullivan also played Railway Cup football for Munster.

At the age of 21 O'Sullivan became a member of the Cork County Board and was elected vice-chairman in 1970 - occupying the position for five years. In his final year he was acting vice chairman before being elected to the position in his own right for a three-year term in 1976. O'Sullivan presided over one of the most successful eras for hurling in the modern era, with the Cork senior hurling team winning three successive All-Ireland Championships during his tenure. In 1980 he was chosen as chairman of the Munster Council.

O'Sullivan's grandsons, Niall and Rory Scannell, have represented Munster and Ireland in rugby union.

== Honours ==
Lees

- Cork Senior Football Championship (1): 1955 (c)

Cork

- Munster Senior Football Championship (2): 1956, 1957
- National Football League (1): 1955-56

Sporting positions
Preceded by	Cork Senior Football Captain; 1956	Succeeded by Nealie Duggan
Preceded by Ned Cotter	Vice-Chairman of the Cork County Board; 1970-1975	Succeeded by Paddy O'Driscoll
Preceded by Jack Barrett	Chairman of the Cork County Board; 1976-1978	Succeeded by Paddy O'Driscoll
Preceded by Michael Frawley	Chairman of the Munster Council; 1980-	Succeeded by Brendan Vaughan
