= Crescent College =

Comprehensive school in Limerick, Ireland

Location
- Dooradoyle; Limerick, County Limerick; Ireland
- Coordinates: 52°38′11″N 8°38′26″W

Information
- Type: Comprehensive
- Motto: Crescentes in Illo Per Omnia; Quis Separabit Nos ("Growing in Him through all things" "Who will separate us")
- Religious affiliation: Catholic (Jesuit)
- Founded: 1565 (original foundation); 1859 & 1971 (reconstituted)
- Gender: Coeducational
- Age: 12 to 18
- Enrolment: 937 (2024)
- Slogan: Ad maiorem Dei gloriam
- Website: Crescentsj.com

Crescent College Comprehensive SJ, formerly known as the College of the Sacred Heart, is a Catholic secondary school located on 40 acres (160,000 m^{2}) of parkland at Dooradoyle, Limerick, Ireland. The college is one of a number of Jesuit schools in Ireland.

== Administration ==
The school operates under the trusteeship of the Society of Jesus and the Minister for Education, with the Jesuit Provincial appointing a majority of the members of the Board of Management, including the chair. The ethos is Jesuit and Catholic, although most of the teaching staff are lay-persons. A number of Jesuit priests live on campus at the Della Strada residence, which hosts the Jesuit Refugee Service. In 2001 the school appointed its first lay headmaster.

== Campus ==
Crescent now sits on 40 acres of grounds and gardens landscaped by Fr William Troddyn and the late school gardener, P.J. Brennan, who together 'purloined' clippings and bulbs from the Limerick region in order to use on the grounds of Crescent, including an avenue of copper beeches. The school also maintains a nature garden to attract wildlife to the campus.

Some commemorative inscription stones from Castle Lane, dating from the 16th and 17th centuries, were built into the external walls of the old Georgian school buildings at the Crescent in Limerick city centre. Another stone from the Castle Lane site, inscribed with a cross and the motto IHS, dated 1642, was brought to Dooradoyle in 1973 and was placed above the 1973 Foundation stone of the present site.

== History ==
=== 16th century ===
The first Jesuit school in Ireland was established at Limerick by the Apostolic Visitor of the Holy See, David Wolfe. Wolfe had been sent to Ireland by Pope Pius IV with the concurrence of the third Jesuit General, Diego Laynez. He was charged with setting up grammar schools "as a remedy against the profound ignorance of the people". In 1565 preparations began for establishing a school at Limerick.

At his instigation, Richard Creagh, a priest of the Diocese of Limerick, was persuaded to accept the vacant Archdiocese of Armagh, and was consecrated at Rome in 1564. An English Jesuit, William Good, joined him. Good had completed the Spiritual Exercises in 1562 under the direction of Mercurian, and at his recommendation had been formally admitted to the Society of Jesus shortly before by Jean Montaigne at the Jesuit college in Tournai.

Wolfe intended to establish the first Irish Counter-Reformation school at Limerick, with the Primate's approval, and so it was intended that on arrival in Ireland Good should travel there, and be accompanied by a Limerick-born Jesuit scholastic, Edmund Daniel, who was a kinsman of Wolfe's. Ultimately, Good and Daniel would not enjoy a good relationship.

This early Limerick school operated in difficult circumstances. In April 1566 Good sent a detailed report to Rome of his activities via the Portuguese Jesuits. He informed the Jesuit General that he and Daniel had arrived at Limerick city two years beforehand and their situation there had been perilous. They established contact with Wolfe, but were only able to meet with him at night, as the English authorities were attempting to arrest the Legate. Wolfe charged them initially with teaching to the boys of Limerick, with an emphasis on religious instruction, and Good translated the cathechism from Latin into English for this purpose. They remained in the city for eight months, before moving to Kilmallock in December 1565 under the protection of the Earl of Desmond, where they lived in more comfort than the primitive conditions they experienced in the city. However they were unable to support themselves at Kilmallock and three months later they returned to the city in Easter 1566, and strangely set up their house in accommodation owned by the Lord Deputy of Ireland, which was conveyed to them by certain influential friends.

They recommenced teaching at Castle Lane, and imparting the sacraments, though their activities were restricted by the arrival of Royal Commissioners.

The number of scholars in their care was very small. The school was conducted in one large aula, but the students were divided into distinct classes. The top class studied the first and second parts of Johannes Despauterius's Commentarli grammatici, and read a few letters of Cicero or the dialogues of Frusius (André des Freux, SJ). The second class committed Donatus' texts in Latin to memory and read dialogues as well as works by Ēvaldus Gallus. Students in the third class learned Donatus by heart, though translated into English rather than through Latin. Young boys in the fourth class were taught to read. Progress was slow because there were too few teachers to conduct classes simultaneously.

In the spirit of Ignatius's Roman College founded 14 years before, no fee was requested from pupils, though as a result the two Jesuits lived in very poor conditions and were very overworked with teaching and administering the sacraments to the public. In late 1568 the Castle Lane School, in the presence of Daniel and Good, was attacked and looted by government agents sent by Sir Thomas Cusack during the pacification of Munster. The political and religious climate had become more uncertain in the lead up to Pope Pius V's formal excommunication of Queen Elizabeth I, which resulted in a new wave of repression of Catholicism in England and Ireland. At the end of 1568 the Anglican Bishop of Meath, Hugh Brady, was sent to Limerick charged with a Royal Commission to seek out and expel the Jesuits. Daniel was immediately ordered to quit the city and went to Lisbon, where he resumed his studies with the Portuguese Jesuits. Good moved on to Clonmel, before establishing himself at Youghal until 1577.

In 1571, after Wolfe had been captured and imprisoned at Dublin Castle, Daniel persuaded the Portuguese Province to agree a surety for the ransom of Wolfe, who was quickly banished on release. Daniel returned to Ireland the following year, but was immediately captured and incriminating documents were found on his person, which were taken as proof of his involvement with the rebellious cousin of the Earl of Desmond, James Fitzmaurice and a Spanish plot. He was executed on 25 October 1572.

=== 17th - 18th centuries ===
At the Restoration of Charles II the school moved back to Castle Lane, and remained largely undisturbed for the next 40 years, until the surrender of the city to Williamite forces in 1692. In 1671 Dr James Douley was appointed Vicar Apostolic of Limerick and during his visitation to the Diocese reported to the Holy See that this and other Catholic schools operating in the Diocese were also attended by local Protestants.

Despite the efforts of the Castle authorities and English government the Limerick school managed to survive the Protestant Reformation, the Cromwellian invasion and Williamite Wars, and subsequent Penal Laws. It was finally forced to close, not for religious or confessional reasons, but due to the political difficulties of the Jesuit Order elsewhere.

=== 19th and early 20th centuries ===
Following the restoration of the Society of Jesus in 1814, the Jesuits gradually re-established a number of their schools throughout the country, starting with foundations at Kildare and Dublin. They returned to Limerick at the invitation of the Bishop of Limerick, Dr. John Ryan, in 1859. Negotiations between the Order and the Diocese of Limerick were conducted at Rome rather than Ireland, and it was agreed that the new school would be a day school only. The Irish Vice Provincial, Fr Joseph Lentaigne, reluctantly agreed given the demands of existing Irish Jesuit Houses and at the beginning of the 1859 school year the Bishop's school was entrusted to Jesuit management. The pioneer Jesuit community in 1859 consisted in Frs. Edward Kelly (1824–1905) (Rector), Thomas Kelly (1829–1898), Peter Foley (1826–1893), Edmund Hogan (1831–1917), Matthew Saurin (1825–1901), and Matthew Russell (1834–1912).

This diocesan college operated initially at premises in Hartstone Street, which had been occupied by the Sisters of the Faithful Companions of Jesus, before they purchased Laurel Hill House and established a school for girls there. Paul Connolly, from a Limerick City family, was the first pupil enrolled, and also attending that day was the future Bishop of Limerick, Edward O'Dwyer.

The curriculum included ancient classics, mathematics, and modern languages (English and French). German was added later and the school prospectus advertised that boys were to be prepared "for the University and the Ecclesiastical Colleges; for the Learned Professions; for the Public Service – Civil and Military; and for the department of Mercantile and Commercial Life".

In 1862 the Jesuits acquired Crescent House and three neighbouring buildings towards the southern end of the Georgian Crescent. Crescent House was a large city residence which had been vacated by a local banking family, the Russells. The Georgian house on the Crescent property had a large garden and a number of vacant neighbouring sites, offering possibilities for expansion. However the Jesuits had paid a large sum for Crescent House and they initially postponed plans for a neighbouring church until this debt was lessened. It wasn't until 1864 that the execution of plans for the church commenced and although the garden of Crescent House was large, it wasn't sufficient to house the new church so additional properties had to be purchased.

At this time the school suffered a setback when the Jesuits quarreled with Bishop Ryan's successor, Dr George Butler. The Limerick community had taken a neutral stance during the 1868 election, which caused a caustic response from the local clergy and press, and a number of boys were withdrawn from the school as a result. Accordingly, Bishop Butler removed the Diocesan College from their care, moving it back to Hartstone Street. The Jesuits, however, continued with their own school at the newly acquired buildings at the Crescent, which became independent of the Diocese and was renamed Sacred Heart College.

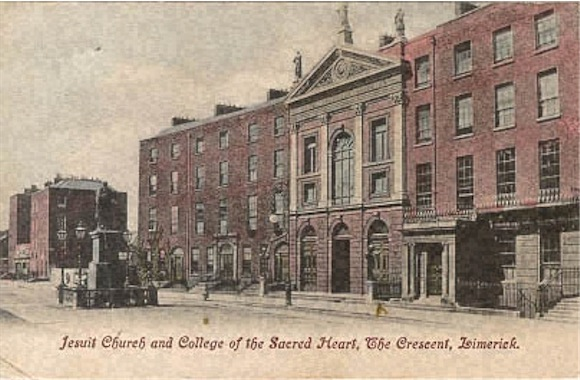
O'Connell Street Campus

The school at the Crescent, and the attached chapel, were dedicated first to St Aloysius Gonzaga, but rededicated to the Sacred Heart in 1868 after the school chapel was enlarged and opened for public worship. This was the first church and school in Ireland dedicated to the cult of the Sacred Heart, popularised centuries before in France by Claude de la Colombiere, S.J. Sacred Heart College, like Belvedere College in Dublin, became recognised by the name of its premises, and was popularly known as Crescent College, or "the Crescent". Crescent was a fee-paying school catering in the main to the city's growing Catholic middle class, and received no government support. In its early years Sacred Heart (Crescent) College struggled to survive in competition with the Bishop's school and many students enrolled in the preparatory school left for boarding schools as they became older. The Province accordingly sent a new generation of able Jesuit administrators to get the college back on its feet, including Thomas A. Finlay and Peter Finlay in 1879, which brought a new vigour. When the results of the first nationwide Intermediate Examinations were published in 1879 a Crescent boy, Charles Doyle (later a Judge of the King's Bench), obtained first place in Ireland. This was seen as a victory for Catholic schools in receipt of no public endowment or subsidy and messages of congratulation were sent from many quarters, including the Archbishop of Dublin, Dr Walsh.

Further innovations came in 1874 when the rector, Fr William Ronan, S.J., invited a French Jesuit colleague Fr Jean Baptiste René to establish an Apostolic College at Crescent House as a seminary for men of little means. This proved a success, but overcrowding with the day pupils necessitated expansion. An appeal was launched to the Bishops of Ireland and by their aid the Jesuits were able to acquire an adjoining house beside the College in 1880. In September 1882 the Apostolic College relocated to new premises at Mungret, with funds provided by a local Catholic nobleman, the Earl of Emly. These schools were again to be joined together when Mungret College merged with Crescent in 1974.

During the national struggle for independence, 1916–1922, a Jesuit called Fr. William Hackett established the Crescent Volunteers. Hackett was disappointed with the results of his efforts and lamented the presence of many 'seonins' in Crescent College - and the Volunteers were shut down by the rector in 1917, though training camps were still being held as late as 1920. Masked Crown forces raided the school on two occasions in November 1920.

=== Late 20th - early 21st centuries ===
In 1939, the school population remained under 130, but by the 1940s it grew to 300 boys, rising to over 500 by the 1960s. A biography of Fr William Hackett reveals his belief that parents who sent their children to Jesuit schools were "making their way into the upper middle class on the back of the Jesuit vow of poverty". Hackett was not unique in this view, and the Generalship of Pedro Arrupe urged the Jesuits to return to the original Ignatian vision and the spirit of the early Jesuit schools. It was proposed that the Crescent in Limerick and Gonzaga College in Dublin should adopt a comprehensive curriculum in a new relationship with the Minister for Education, and cease to be fee-paying schools. Negotiations opened in the late 1960s at the invitation of the then Minister and former pupil Donagh O'Malley, who had been a classmate of the Jesuit Provincial, Cecil McGarry, S.J. The comprehensive scheme proceeded in Limerick only, and this ushered in a period of reform and expansion under Fr Thomas Morrissey: the name Sacred Heart College was dropped and "Crescent College Comprehensive SJ" adopted in recognition of the more common name of the school.

The redesignation of the school as a comprehensive was not without controversy and the Limerick Trades Council complained in the media of the unsuitability of Jesuits to run such a school, given their association with upper-class education. The board of management met with the Council and argued that the Society's schools in Limerick before the suppression had been free. The government's new scheme, they argued, gave the Society an opportunity to return to its earlier tradition, bringing the benefits of Jesuit education to all classes.

In 21st century review of a work on the history of the Crescent, edited by Anthony White and published for the sesquicentenary of the College, Dr Daire Keogh of DCU critiques an article written by Fr Morrissey. Keogh argued that the Jesuit initiative at Limerick didn't reflect the 'option for the poor' as promoted by Pedro Arrupe. Rather, he argued, the accommodation at Limerick reflected "the desire of the Minister for Education to secure a Jesuit endorsement for a new model of schooling, approval which would lift the [SIC middle classes view] of what were often dubbed 'contraceptive schools'".

In 1971, the Georgian school buildings at Crescent House were found to be structurally unsound, overcrowded, and not adaptable to expansion. Some thought was given to a relocation to Mungret College, but after consideration the Mungret site was deemed to be too far outside the city catchment area. Instead land was purchased at Dooradoyle in 1973, resulting in the demolition of the MacMahon historical seat (a family closely related to the French Dukes of Magenta). Shortly afterwards the Crescent Shopping Centre opened beside the school from which it was named.

Dooradoyle campus

In 1978 Crescent became the first Irish Jesuit school to become partially co-educational, with a ratio of 3 boys to 1 girl. The preparatory school, which had remained at Crescent House, was phased out over 5 years after the transfer of the senior school to Dooradoyle and closed in 1978 as the Department of Education declined to allow boys an automatic right of entry to the secondary school. At Dooradoyle a number of curriculum changes were undertaken and Crescent, along with Gonzaga in Dublin, became the first schools in Ireland to offer a transition year. Other changes, such as a Classical Studies programme in the 1970s and a special "Irish Studies" programme for first years, were later phased out and not adopted in other schools. In the 1980s, in collaboration with then National Institute for Higher Education in Limerick (subsequently UL), students from Crescent were able to study computer and technology courses at Leaving Certificate level, allowing entry to third level courses.

In June 2006, Sacred Heart Church closed, ending the connection of 150 years with Crescent House – from which the school took its name. A House of Prayer and Spirituality has located at the Jesuit Residence in Dooradoyle. The Sacred Heart Church building, after a long vacancy, was purchased by a Traditionalist Order, the Institute of Christ the King Sovereign Priest.

== Competitions ==
In 2011 they won a European Space Agency competition and represented Ireland in Norway, finishing third among teams from fourteen countries, with their satellite in a can. In June 2015 Crescent beat 25 other schools in the Irish Science Teachers' Association Junior Science Quiz.

== Sports ==
Girls' hockey and boys' rugby are the main sports, though many other contact and noncontact activities are offered. The girls have competed in futsal. Rugby at Crescent developed from the late 1940s under coach Fr. Gerry Guinane, and in that time Crescent had some success in the Munster Schools Senior Cup, constituting one of the big five rugby schools in Munster and seeded in the top 8 schools at Provincial level. It has won a number of senior titles since the cup's inception in 1909, winning the Schools Senior Cups on rugby 12 occasions in 1947, 1949, 1951, 1963, 1983, 1986, 1989, 1990, 1994, 2013, 2014 and 2022. The school is represented nationally at club level by Old Crescent RFC, which is now an open club.

In 2010 Crescent was named Munster rugby and hockey School of the Year, and in 2011 Richard Butler, Chairman of Limerick County Council, hosted a reception at the County Hall to mark the sporting achievements of the school in that year. The girls' hockey team won the Kate Russell All-Ireland Hockey Championship in 2015. Both boys and girls have represented the Munster and Irish teams in rugby and hockey at various levels. In 2017, the boys won the all-Ireland basketball title. The college won the Munster Irish Schools Championship in golf in 2008 at senior level and 2011 at junior level.

== Student life ==
According to some media outlets in Limerick, "the school has a long-standing successful reputation for drama and the performing arts". The school has an award-winning choir and orchestra, taking part annually in the Feis Ceoil classical music festival at the RDS in Dublin, Winning first place in 1996 and second place in 1984, 2005 and 2006. In 2013 a 30-member Orchestra and 65 strong choir recorded a song for the Waltons Music for Schools Competition and achieved 2nd place nationally at a performance in the National Concert Hall, Dublin. An annual musical school show raises money for charity.

The College also maintains a chapter of the Society of St Vincent de Paul, which has an annual 'sleep out'. Students also participate in mandatory social placement programme for fifth-year students. In line with its objective of educating men and women for others, in 2011 the school hosted the opening of the website Why Care? which is run by the Jesuit Center for Faith and Justice in Dublin. It seeks to keep teachers and students alike abreast of social problems afflicting Ireland.

== Recognition ==
The 2016 Sunday Times table, of the top performing 400 schools in Ireland, placed Crescent College 24th in terms of provision of graduates to university and tertiary colleges, and ranked Crescent as the 5th best school in Munster. According to the Irish Independent, Crescent has educated executives from two of the top three companies in Ireland: Google's John Herlihy and Microsoft's Paul Rellis.

== Notable alumni ==
Arts & media
- Brendan Bowyer, showband singer
- Richard Harris, actor
- Conor McNamara, sports broadcaster
- Matthew Potter, writer & historian
- Joseph O'Mara, 19th century opera singer
- Daragh O'Malley, actor
- Bill Whelan, Riverdance composer
- Dermot Whelan, comedian
- Terry Wogan, BBC radio & TV presenter

Law

- Mr. Justice John L. Murray, Attorney General of Ireland & Chief Justice of Irish Supreme Court
- Mr. Justice Kevin O'Higgins, judge of the High Court
- His Honour Judge Thomas E. O'Donnell, judge of the Circuit Court

Politics & Government

- George Clancy, Mayor of Limerick 1921
- Canon John Hayes, founder of Muintir na Tíre
- Pádraig MacKernan, diplomat and Ambassador to France and the United States
- Tom O'Donnell, Fine Gael TD & former government minister
- Francis O’Keeffe, Irish Nationalist MP at Westminster
- Desmond O'Malley, founder of the Progressive Democrats & government minister
- Donogh O'Malley, Fianna Fáil TD & government minister
- Tim O'Malley, Progressive Democrats TD & Minister of State
- Ted Russell, independent TD
- David Sheehy, Irish Nationalist MP at Westminster
- Paddy Lane, Irish Member of the European Parliament (MEP) and president of the IFA

Religious

- Alphonsus Cullinan, Bishop of Waterford and Lismore
- Dr. John Harty, Archbishop of Cashel

Sports

- Peter Clohessy, Ireland rugby union international
- Conor Niland, Ireland Davis Cup team player
- Eoin Reddan, Ireland rugby union international
- Roisin Upton, Ireland women's field hockey international
- David, Paul and Richard Wallace, Ireland rugby union internationals
- Gordon Wood, Ireland rugby union international
- Calvin Nash, Ireland rugby union international

== In popular culture ==
- Angela's Ashes, Frank McCourt's memoir of growing up in Limerick in the 1930s and '40s, references the school.

== See also ==
- List of Jesuit schools
- List of Jesuit sites in Ireland
- List of Munster Schools Rugby Senior Cup Winners
