= Mungret College =

Former Jesuit school near Limerick, Ireland

Coordinates: 52.6315°N 8.68°W

- Mungret, County Limerick; Ireland

Information
- Type: Voluntary
- Religious affiliations: Roman Catholic; Society of Jesus
- Established: 1882; 144 years ago
- Gender: Male

Mungret College (1882-1974) was a Jesuit apostolic school and a lay secondary school near Limerick, Ireland. Located on the western outskirts of the modern-day suburban town of Raheen, it was operational from 1882 until 1974 when it closed as a school for the last time. The college produced over 1000 priests in that period. It had previously been an agricultural college and a Limerick diocesan seminary until 1888.

The secondary school was relatively small, with around 225 boarders and 25 day boarders. Mungret was one of a number of Jesuit schools founded in Ireland.

== History ==
=== Pre-1882 ===
In 1881 the Commissioners of Education had opened an agricultural college near the village of Mungret, from which Mungret College takes its name. This was largely due to the influence of Lord Monteagle of Brandon, a former Chancellor of the Exchequer in the British Government and a good Irish landlord. It was built to accommodate seventy to eighty students but never had more than fourteen students and at times as few as four. In 1877 it was decided to close the college.

It was rented by the Bishop of Limerick for his seminarians for the scholastic year of 1880–1881 and was then vacated.

=== Foundation ===
In 1850 a young priest of the Diocese of Dromore was received into the order of the Society of Jesus; his name was Fr. William Ronan. In 1872 he was appointed rector of the Sacred Heart Church and Crescent College, Limerick, a position he was to occupy for the next ten years. There he thought about the possibility of setting up a college to provide for unfulfilled vocations in Ireland.

He discovered that a fellow Jesuit in France, in 1865, had started a scheme for the endowment of special colleges in France and Belgium, called apostolic schools, which were supported by benefactors and by the parents of students. He travelled to the Continent to visit these colleges and to seek out an experienced man to take charge of a similar college in Limerick. While staying in a Jesuit house in France, he met Fr Jean Baptiste René, a jesuit priest and member of the community, an English speaker and to the great delight of Fr. Ronan, a former head of the apostolic school at Poitiers. He was also willing to come to Ireland if his Provincial would sanction his departure.

With some difficulty this permission was obtained and Fr René was in Limerick for the opening of the apostolic school at Crescent House in September 1880. This had eight boys in its first year and by the end of the second year there were twenty eight. However overcrowding became an issue with the day pupils at Crescent and clearly a larger building was required.

From 1888 until 1909 students were matriculated and examined for degrees by the Royal University of Ireland, subsequently with its dissolution and the establishment of the National University of Ireland, students were examined and had degrees awarded until 1912.

=== Mungret ===
Fr. Ronan had been considering the former agricultural college at Mungret as an alternative. However the apostolic school alone was not a viable proposition so he persuaded the Bishop of Limerick to send the diocesan seminary back to Mungret. The apostolics moved to Mungret on 10 August 1882, and were joined by the seminarians on 14 September that year. Fr. Ronan was the first Rector and Fr René was in charge of the apostolics. The college began with 32 apostolics and 31 seminarians.

Shortly after its founding a new Bishop of Limerick decided to house the seminarians in the city where they would be nearer the cathedral. This reduction in numbers was made up by accepting more lay boys. In the course of time the numbers of lay boys considerably exceeded the numbers of apostolics. At its height the college catered for 267 full-time and day boarders.

=== Closure ===
Mungret College closed in 1974. Many of its teaching staff transferred to Crescent College, another Jesuit school in Limerick, out of which Mungret College had originally grown. Dineen and Company purchased Mungret College and its 240 acres (0.97 km^{2}) of land in 1979 and subsequently purchased additional adjacent land. The company was wound up on 12 February 2020.

The building and surrounding area became the home of the new Mungret Community College from its opening in September 2017 until September 2024, when it moved into its new premises, also built on the grounds of the original college.

== Notable past pupils ==
- The 1st Viscount Bracken, a journalist and businessman who served as a British Conservative Cabinet minister under Prime Minister Winston Churchill during World War II. Lord Bracken mainly served as Minister of Information, based at the Senate House in Bloomsbury. He also briefly served, in 1945, as First Lord of the Admiralty.
- Gordon Wood, former rugby union footballer who represented Ireland and the British Lions during the 1950s and early 1960s.
- Frank Fahy, TD, Irish politician who served as Ceann Comhairle of Dáil Éireann (the Lower House of the Oireachtas).
- Commandant-General Tom Barry, prominent leader of the Irish Republican Army during the Irish War of Independence.
- The Most Rev. Dr. Michael Joseph Curley, 10th Archbishop of Baltimore and first Archbishop of Washington.
- Dr. Timothy Cardinal Manning, Archbishop of Los Angeles from 1970 to 1985, and elevated to Cardinal in 1973.
- Michael Morrison SJ, teacher and British army chaplain in the second world war at the liberation of Belsen.
- The Rt Rev. Hugh Monsignor O'Flaherty, the 'Scarlet Pimpernel of the Vatican' during World War II. The film The Scarlet and the Black was made about the exploits of the Monsignor.
- Joseph Walshe, leading Irish diplomat from the 1920s to the 1950s and Secretary of the Department of External Affairs during the Second World War.
- Leo Herbert Lehmann (1895–1950) an Irish author, editor, and director of Christ's Mission in New York. An accomplished priest in the Roman Catholic Church, he later in life converted to Protestantism and served as the editor of The Converted Catholic Magazine. He wrote many magazine articles, books and pamphlets presenting the programs and activities of the Roman Catholic Church.
- Dr. Oliver St John Gogarty, author (attended before transferring to Stonyhurst College).
- Fr. James Coyle, priest murdered in Alabama in 1921.
- Bishop William Turner, Bishop of Buffalo, 1919–1936.
- The Most Reverend Hugh Boyle, first Bishop of Johannesburg, 1954–76.
- Dr Vincent O'Brien, celebrated racehorse trainer and breeder.
- Bishop John Norton, Bishop of Bathurst, Australia.
- Barney Curley, Irish racehorse trainer, professional gambler and charity worker.

== See also ==
- List of Jesuit schools
- List of Jesuit sites in Ireland
