= 2022–23 United Rugby Championship =

- Countries: Ireland; Italy; Scotland; South Africa; Wales
- Date: 16 September 2022 – 27 May 2023
- Champions: (Ireland) Munster (4th title)
- Runners-up: (South Africa) Stormers
- Matches played: 151
- Attendance: 1,633,458 (average 10,818 per match)
- Highest attendance: 56,344; Stormers vs Munster (27 May 2023)
- Top point scorer: (South Africa) Manie Libbok (Stormers) 217
- Top try scorer: (Ireland) Tom Stewart (Ulster) 16

Official website
- unitedrugby.com

The 2022–23 United Rugby Championship was the 22nd season of the professional rugby union competition United Rugby Championship. It began on 16 September 2022 and ended on 27 May 2023. For sponsorship reasons it was known in South Africa as Vodacom United Rugby Championship or Vodacom URC, while in the Northern Hemisphere it was known as the BKT United Rugby Championship or BKT URC.

The final which was held on 27 May 2023 was between defending champions the Stormers and Munster with Munster winning 19–14.

== Format ==
The tournament consists of 21 rounds; 18 rounds of regular season play, followed by three rounds of play-offs.

There are four regional pools: The Irish Shield pool (featuring the four Irish teams), the Welsh Shield pool (featuring the four Welsh teams), the South African Shield pool (featuring the four South African teams) and the Scottish/Italian 'Azzurri/Blue' Shield pool (featuring the two Italian and two Scottish sides). The pools serve three functions; they guarantee a full slate of derby matches for each team, they are the primary route for qualification for the European Rugby Champions Cup, and they award a minor Regional Shield trophy to the top team in each pool, which thereby functions as a national championship in three of the four pools, and a cross-border regional championship in the Scottish-Italian pool.

Teams play six matches against their regional pool rivals home and away. The remaining twelve matches are made up by a single round robin, consisting of an even number of six home and six away matches against all the sides from the other pools.

For the Championship itself, there is only one main league table (the conference system used in previous Pro14 years has been dropped). The top eight sides in the table will qualify for the quarter finals, followed by semi-finals and a grand final, with teams seeded 1 to 4 with home advantage for the lowest seeded side. The Regional Shield pools have no direct link to the play-offs and by extension the Championship itself, and it is technically possible to win a Regional Shield but not contest the play-offs, as the Welsh sides showed in 2023.

A total of eight sides will qualify for the following season's European Rugby Champions Cup, but by a slightly different distribution method than the play-offs, while the remaining eight sides will qualify for the EPCR Challenge Cup. All points won in the competition contributed to rankings in the regional pools, with the top side in each regional pool automatically qualifying for the European Rugby Champions Cup. The remaining four places then go to (if not already qualified) the winners of the URC, the European Champions Cup and the European Challenge Cup, (if either or both of the European champions is a URC team that is not already qualified as URC Champion or URC Regional Shield winner) followed then by the highest ranked teams in the main table (who haven't already qualified by other means). A similar format was used to determine playoff contenders in the Super Rugby competition.

== Teams ==
=== United Rugby Championship ===
Team	Country	Coach / Director of Rugby	Captain	Stadium	Capacity
Benetton	Italy	(Italy) Marco Bortolami	(South Africa) Dewaldt Duvenage (Italy) Michele Lamaro	Stadio Comunale di Monigo	5,000
Bulls	South Africa	(South Africa) Jake White	(South Africa) Marcell Coetzee	Loftus Versfeld	51,762
Cardiff	Wales	(Wales) Dai Young	(Wales) Josh Turnbull	Cardiff Arms Park	12,125
Connacht	Ireland	(Australia) Andy Friend	(Ireland) Jack Carty	Galway Sportsgrounds	8,129
Dragons	Wales	(England) Dean Ryan	(Wales) Harrison Keddie (Wales) Will Rowlands	Rodney Parade	8,700
Edinburgh	Scotland	(England) Steve Diamond (Note: Mike Blair was the head coach of Edinburgh until March 2023, when he stepped down to transition into the role of attack coach. Steve Diamond was then appointed to take on head coaching duties for the remainder of the season, from the position of lead rugby consultant.)	(Scotland) Grant Gilchrist (Scotland) Jamie Ritchie	Edinburgh Rugby Stadium; Murrayfield Stadium	7,800; 67,144
Glasgow Warriors	Scotland	(South Africa) Franco Smith	(Scotland) Kyle Steyn	Scotstoun Stadium	7,351
Leinster	Ireland	(Ireland) Leo Cullen	(Ireland) Johnny Sexton	RDS Arena; Aviva Stadium	18,500; 51,700
Lions	South Africa	(South Africa) Ivan van Rooyen	(South Africa) Reinhard Nothnagel	Ellis Park Stadium	62,567
Munster	Ireland	(England) Graham Rowntree	(Ireland) Peter O'Mahony	Thomond Park; Musgrave Park	25,600; 8,008
Ospreys	Wales	(England) Toby Booth	(Wales) Justin Tipuric	Swansea.com Stadium	20,827
Scarlets	Wales	(Wales) Dwayne Peel	(Wales) Jonathan Davies	Parc y Scarlets	14,870
Sharks	South Africa	(South Africa) Sean Everitt	(South Africa) Siya Kolisi	Kings Park Stadium	52,000
Stormers	South Africa	(South Africa) John Dobson	(South Africa) Steven Kitshoff	Cape Town Stadium Danie Craven Stadium	55,000 16,000
Ulster	Ireland	(England) Dan McFarland	(Ireland) Iain Henderson	Ravenhill Stadium	18,196
Zebre Parma	Italy	(Italy) Fabio Roselli	(Italy) Dave Sisi	Stadio Sergio Lanfranchi	5,000

=== Locations ===
Location of Irish, Scottish and Welsh teams:	Location of Italian teams: Location of South African teams:

== Regional Pools and European qualification ==
The Regional pools of the regular season are the primary mechanism by which teams qualify for European competition, with the winner of each regional pool guaranteed qualification for the European Rugby Champions Cup, ensuring at least one South African, one Welsh and one Irish side qualify for the premier European competition. As Scotland and Italy are sharing a single regional pool, at least one team from those two countries combined is also guaranteed entry, but neither country individually is so guaranteed. The remaining four places will be awarded to those with the four best overall regular season records, regardless of which pool they take part in. As such, it is possible that a team will qualify for the ERCC without reaching the URC play-offs by topping its pool, but finishing ninth or lower overall. If the club that wins the URC championship has not qualified for the Champions Cup on the above criteria, it will qualify instead of the last of the qualified teams that did not win its pool. The same will apply if a URC team wins the 2022-2023 Champions Cup or Challenge Cup and qualifies for the 2023-2024 Champions Cup without having qualified by its league position.

Priority order for European Champions Cup Qualification is therefore :

- 2022–23 United Rugby Championship champion
- the four URC Shield winners (if not already qualified as URC Champion)
- the European Rugby Champions Cup champion (if a URC team but not already qualified as above)
- the European Rugby Challenge Cup champion (if a URC team but not already qualified as above)
- the next highest-ranked teams during regular season play not already qualified as above, until eight overall qualifiers have been selected (between 1 and 4 can qualify under this head).

In theory, a team as high as third overall could therefore fail to qualify for the Champions Cup if it fails to win any of the four available titles (URC, its Regional Shield, Champions or Challenge Cup), and they are all won by much lower ranked URC teams, while the team in last place, if it wins a European competition, can qualify for the following year's Champions Cup. In practice, a team may qualify from an overall 9th or 10th position as the shield winner in a weak regional pool, but the emphasis on derby matches, and the points available in them, tend to ensure that the lowest placed shield winner cannot finish lower than tenth.

All 16 teams, however, are guaranteed entry into one of the two competitions. The lowest a team can finish overall while winning its URC shield and qualifying for the Champions Cup is thirteenth.

2022–23 United Rugby Championship Regional Shield Pools
(Ireland) Irish Shield
	Team	P	W	D	L	PF	PA	PD	TF	TA	TBP	LBP	Pts
1	(Ireland) Leinster (S)	18	16	1	1	580	363	+217	84	50	13	0	79
2	(Ireland) Ulster	18	13	0	5	554	378	+176	79	45	12	4	68
3	(Ireland) Munster	18	10	1	7	470	357	+113	61	43	9	4	55
4	(Ireland) Connacht	18	10	0	8	456	426	+30	64	58	7	3	50
(Italy) (Scotland) Scottish/Italian Shield
	Team	P	W	D	L	PF	PA	PD	TF	TA	TBP	LBP	Pts
1	(Scotland) Glasgow Warriors (S)	18	12	0	6	498	403	+95	72	53	11	0	63
2	(Italy) Benetton	18	8	0	10	440	533	–93	56	74	8	1	41
3	(Scotland) Edinburgh	18	6	0	12	466	467	-1	70	62	8	6	38
4	(Italy) Zebre Parma	18	0	0	18	343	734	–391	50	105	6	5	11
(South Africa) South African Shield
	Team	P	W	D	L	PF	PA	PD	TF	TA	TBP	LBP	Pts
1	(South Africa) Stormers (S)	18	12	2	4	531	391	+140	69	48	13	3	68
2	(South Africa) Bulls	18	10	0	8	613	448	+165	78	52	11	2	53
3	(South Africa) Sharks	18	9	1	8	486	480	+6	63	61	8	2	48
4	(South Africa) Lions	18	9	0	9	454	538	–84	55	75	7	2	45
(Wales) Welsh Shield
	Team	P	W	D	L	PF	PA	PD	TF	TA	TBP	LBP	Pts
1	(Wales) Cardiff (S)	18	9	0	9	425	470	–45	52	64	6	2	44
2	(Wales) Ospreys	18	5	2	11	400	514	–114	52	70	6	5	35
3	(Wales) Scarlets	18	6	1	11	435	506	–71	55	65	5	3	34
4	(Wales) Dragons	18	4	0	14	391	534	–143	46	70	5	3	24
If teams are level at any stage, tiebreakers are applied in the following order: 1. number of matches won 2. the difference between points for and points against 3. the number of tries scored 4. the most points scored 5. the difference between tries for and tries against 6. the fewest red cards received 7. the fewest yellow cards received
Green background indicates teams currently leading the Regional Shield, and leading the race for a place in the 2023–24 European Champions Cup (S) indicates teams has won the Regional Shield, and thus guaranteed a place in the 2023–24 European Champions Cup

The following teams have therefore confirmed their qualification for the European Rugby Champions Cup for the 2023–24 season as URC Champions:

- (Ireland) Munster, who defeated Stormers 19–14 in the URC Grand Final to become URC Champions.

The following teams have confirmed their qualification for the European Rugby Champions Cup for the 2023–24 season upon winning their URC Regional Shield:

- (Ireland) Leinster, as the URC Irish Shield winner
- (South Africa) Stormers, as the URC South African Shield winner
- (Scotland) Glasgow Warriors, as the URC Scottish-Italian Shield Winner
- (Wales) Cardiff, as the URC Welsh Shield winner

As no URC team won a European trophy (Leinster and Glasgow being runners up in the Champions Cup and Challenge Cup respectively), the reserved places for the winners of those competitions is ignored.

The overall champion and four shield winners are therefore joined by the following teams, who claim the final three places in the Champions Cup:

- (Ireland) Ulster, by league placing
- (South Africa) Bulls, by league placing
- (Ireland) Connacht, by league placing .

As Cardiff, the URC Welsh shield winner, sit below eighth in the overall standings, the eighth placed team, Sharks, could not qualify by League standings, despite finishing in eighth place. By losing their URC quarter-final, Sharks were therefore the eighth and final team eliminated from contention for a spot in the 2023-24 European Rugby Champions Cup.

Ulster Rugby, Munster Rugby and Bulls qualified through their league placings at the end of the regular season. Connacht also qualified for the European Rugby Champions Cup by league placing following the elimination of Sharks, the only remaining team that could deny them the final spot by winning the URC Championship.

Munster "upgraded" their qualification route by winning the URC Championship itself, which technically takes priority over league placing (or winning the Regional Shield), but as they had already secured the place through league placing, it did not materially alter the overall list of qualifiers.

Zebre Parma, Dragons, Scarlets, Ospreys, Edinburgh Rugby, Benetton, Lions and Sharks have qualified for the European Rugby Challenge Cup for 2023–24. For the second season, only the Welsh Shield winner gains Champions Cup qualification from among the Welsh sides, and no Italian side qualify for the Champions Cup.

== URC League standings ==
The overall United Rugby Championship table is the central pillar of the regular season, and the mechanism by which the teams qualifying for the Championship play-off bracket are decided. The top eight teams in the table at the end of the regular season, regardless of regional pool, qualify for the play-off quarter-finals, seeded in the order they finished the regular season.

The season concluded with seven of the play-off contenders from last season making the knock-out stages for a second time, with only Connacht, replacing Edinburgh, entering the post-season for the first time. All four Irish provinces qualified for the knock-out rounds. For the second year, no Welsh or Italian team qualified for the final stages, Benetton being the last Welsh or Italian side eliminated on the final day of the regular season.

Leinster Rugby topped the regular season standings for the fourth successive time, and the tenth time in total, both a record. They have confirmed home advantage and first seeding for the whole play-offs. Ulster Rugby have confirmed home advantage for a quarter-final and semi-final. As the final will be held in the Aviva Stadium, neither side will need to leave Ireland to win the competition.

Glasgow Warriors and Stormers as guaranteed fourth and third placed team, have home advantage for the quarter-finals only.

Leinster, Ulster, Glasgow, Stormers, Munster and the Bulls have qualified for the 2023–24 Champions Cup by virtue of their league position. Cardiff Rugby have also qualified as the highest-placed Welsh team.

The remaining position went to Connacht after the Sharks were eliminated from the Championship playoffs.

2022–23 United Rugby Championship
	Team	P	W	D	L	PF	PA	PD	TF	TA	Try bonus	Losing bonus	Pts
1	(Ireland) Leinster	18	16	1	1	580	363	+217	82	42	13	0	79
2	(Ireland) Ulster	18	13	0	5	554	378	+176	79	45	12	4	68
3	(South Africa) Stormers (RU)	18	12	2	4	531	391	+140	69	48	13	3	68
4	(Scotland) Glasgow Warriors	18	13	0	5	498	403	+95	72	53	11	0	63
5	(Ireland) Munster (CH)	18	10	1	7	470	357	+113	61	43	9	4	55
6	(South Africa) Bulls	18	10	0	8	613	448	+165	78	52	11	2	53
7	(Ireland) Connacht	18	10	0	8	456	426	+30	64	58	7	3	50
8	(South Africa) Sharks	18	9	1	8	486	480	+6	63	61	8	2	48
9	(South Africa) Lions	18	9	0	9	454	538	–84	55	75	7	2	45
10	(Wales) Cardiff	18	9	0	9	425	470	–45	52	64	6	2	44
11	(Italy) Benetton	18	8	0	10	440	533	–93	56	74	8	1	41
12	(Scotland) Edinburgh	18	6	0	12	466	467	–1	70	62	8	6	38
13	(Wales) Ospreys	18	5	2	11	400	514	–114	52	70	6	5	35
14	(Wales) Scarlets	18	6	1	11	435	506	–71	55	65	5	3	34
15	(Wales) Dragons	18	4	0	14	391	534	–143	46	70	5	3	24
16	(Italy) Zebre Parma	18	0	0	18	343	734	–391	50	105	6	5	11
If teams are level at any stage, tiebreakers are applied in the following order: 1. number of matches won; 2. the difference between points for and points against; 3. the number of tries scored; 4. the most points scored; 5. the difference between tries for and tries against; 6. the fewest red cards received; 7. the fewest yellow cards received.
Green background indicates teams that are playoff places that top their regional pools and earn a place in the 2023–24 European Champions Cup Blue background indicates teams that did not top their regional pool but are in play-off places and earn a place in the 2023–24 European Champions Cup; Pink background indicates teams that did not top their regional pool but are in play-off places, and earn a place in the 2023–24 European Challenge Cup; Yellow background indicates teams that top their regional pool and thus currently in a qualification place in the 2023–24 European Champions Cup, but are not in a play-off place Plain background indicates teams that earn a place in the 2023–24 European Challenge Cup. Q: qualified for play-offs. H: home field advantage secured for quarter-and semi-final. h; home field advantage secured for quarter-final X: cannot reach play-offs. E: qualified for Champions Cup.

== Regular season ==
=== Round 1 ===
16 September 2022
18:30

(1 BP) Benetton (Italy)	33–11	(Scotland) Glasgow Warriors
Try: Padovani 21'; Lucchesi 36'; Mendy (2) 42', 79'; Con: Smith (2) 43', 80'; Pen: Smith (3) 12', 47', 57'	Report	Try: Z. Fagerson 60'; Pen: Horne (2) 16', 42'

Stadio Comunale di Monigo
Attendance: 1,971
Referee: Frank Murphy

17 September 2022
14:00

(2 BP) Zebre Parma (Italy)	29–33	(Ireland) Leinster (1 BP)
Try: Kriel 28'; Bruno 32'; Gesi 48'; Pelser 55'; Smith 69'; Con: Eden (2) 55', 70'	Report	Try: McGrath 5'; Ruddock (2) 20', 25'; Jenkins 36'; Kearney 60'; Con: R. Byrne (4) 5', 20', 26', 37'

Stadio Sergio Lanfranchi
Attendance: 2,000
Referee: Ben Blain

17 September 2022
15:05

Cardiff (Wales)	20–13	(Ireland) Munster (1 BP)
Try: Llewellyn 3'; Dacey 37'; Summerhill 77'; Con: Evans 38'; Pen: Evans 68'	Report	Try: O'Sullivan 62'; Con: Crowley 63'; Pen: Healy (2) 17', 30'

Cardiff Arms Park
Attendance: 6,434
Referee: Mike Adamson

17 September 2022
16:05

Lions (South Africa)	15–31	(South Africa) Bulls
Try: F. Horn 33'; Louw 43'; Con: Hendrikse 44'; Pen: Hendrikse 7'	Report	Try: Coetzee 3'; Hendricks 22'; Wessels 72'; Con: C. Smith 3'; Steyn 72'; Pen: C. Smith (4) 20', 47', 59', 65'

Ellis Park Stadium
Attendance: 6,720
Referee: AJ Jacobs

17 September 2022
17:15

Scarlets (Wales)	23–23	(Wales) Ospreys
Try: J. Williams 53'; Costelow 65'; Con: Costelow (2) 54', 65'; Pen: Costelow (3) 13', 42', 44'	Report	Try: Anscombe 5'; R. Davies 81'; Con: Anscombe 6'; Walsh 82'; Pen: Anscombe (3) 9', 17', 47'

Parc y Scarlets
Attendance: 9,582
Referee: Adam Jones

17 September 2022
19:35

(1 BP) Ulster (Ireland)	36–10	(Ireland) Connacht
Try: Marshall 27'; Stewart 37'; Doak 50'; S. Moore 63'; Reid 75'; Con: Doak (4) 28', 38', 52', 76'; Pen: Doak 44'	Report	Try: Blade 70'; Con: Hawkshaw 71'; Pen: Fitzgerald 41'

Kingspan Stadium
Attendance: 10,858
Referee: Eoghan Cross

17 September 2022
19:35

(1 BP) Edinburgh (Scotland)	44–6	(Wales) Dragons
Try: Vellacott 27'; Young 34'; Graham (2) 41', 49'; Hoyland 53'; Kinghorn 60'; Dean 62'; Con: Bennett (3) 27', 50', 63'; Pen: Bennett 40'	Report	Pen: Hanrahan (2) 2', 12'

The DAM Health Stadium
Attendance: 5,196
Referee: Andrea Piardi

18 September 2022
19:00

Sharks (South Africa)	P–P	(South Africa) Stormers
	Postponed to 4 February 2023

Kings Park Stadium

=== Round 2 ===
23 September 2022
14:30

(2 BP) Zebre Parma (Italy)	37–42	(South Africa) Sharks (1 BP)
Try: Bigi 42'; Gesi 44'; Fox-Matamua 50'; Venditti 71'; Trulla; Con: Eden (3) 43', 45', 72'; Pen: Eden (2) 14', 78'	Report	Try: Hugo 9'; Van Vuuren 17'; Kok 22'; Janse van Rensburg 26'; Jooste 67'; Con: Chamberlain (4) 11', 18', 23', 27'; Pen: Chamberlain (3) 42', 62', 78'

Stadio Sergio Lanfranchi
Attendance: 2,000
Referee: Craig Evans

23 September 2022
19:35

(1 BP) Glasgow Warriors (Scotland)	52–24	(Wales) Cardiff
Try: F. Brown (2) 22', 51'; Forbes 24'; M. Fagerson 29'; Horne 41'; Z. Fagerson 46'; Gordon 64'; McDowall 73'; Con: Horne (6) 23', 26', 30', 42', 47', 65'	Report	Try: Adams 15'; Dacey 43'; Belcher 69'; Con: Evans (2) 17', 44'; Priestland 70'; Pen: Evans 36'

Scotstoun Stadium
Attendance: 5,790
Referee: Chris Busby

23 September 2022
19:35

(1 BP) Leinster (Ireland)	42–10	(Italy) Benetton
Try: Sheehan (4) 5', 16', 28', 52'; Van der Flier 46'; McGrath 71'; Con: Frawley (3) 7', 17', 29'; R. Byrne (3) 47', 53', 73'	Report	Try: Albanese 57'; Con: Da Re 58'; Pen: Da Re 22'

RDS Arena
Attendance: 13,881
Referee: Jaco Peyper

24 September 2022
13:00

(1 BP) Scarlets (Wales)	39–55	(Ireland) Ulster (1 BP)
Try: J. Davies 16'; Conbeer 20'; Fifita 41'; D. Hughes (2) 54', 62'; Con: Costelow (3) 19', 42', 54'; Patchell 63'; Pen: Costelow 24'; Patchell 67'	Report	Try: O'Connor 5'; M. Moore 14'; Cooney (2) 33', 57'; Marcus Rea 41'; Burns 48'; O'Toole 77'; Con: Cooney (7) 6', 15', 34', 42', 49', 58', 78'; Pen: Cooney (2) 43', 74'

Parc y Scarlets
Attendance: 6,171
Referee: AJ Jacobs

24 September 2022
13:30

Bulls (South Africa)	33–31	(Scotland) Edinburgh
Try: Grobbelaar 11'; Louw 18'; Hendricks 40'; Jacobs; Con: C. Smith (2) 12', 42'; Pen: C. Smith (2) 5', 50'; Steyn 79'	Report	Try: Savala 23'; Graham (3) 31', 46', 52'; Hoyland 69'; Con: Bennett (3) 25', 32', 69'

Loftus Versfeld Stadium
Attendance: 8,225
Referee: Adam Jones

24 September 2022
13:30

(1 BP) Stormers (South Africa)	38–15	(Ireland) Connacht
Try: Roos 3'; Venter 61'; Dayimani 67'; Theunissen 83'; Con: Libbok (3) 5', 63', 84'; Pen: Libbok (4) 12', 26', 44', 54'	Report	Try: Tierney-Martin 38'; Aungier 70'; Con: Hawkshaw 70'; Pen: Fitzgerald 7'

Danie Craven Stadium
Attendance: 9,358
Referee: Gianluca Gnecchi

24 September 2022
19:35

Ospreys (Wales)	27–28	(South Africa) Lions
Try: Giles (2) 12', 16'; Webb 32'; Lake 52'; Con: Walsh (2) 12', 16'; Pen: Walsh 60'	Report	Try: Horn 18'; Nohamba 48'; Van der Merwe 70'; Con: Lombard (2) 19', 71'; Pen: Lombard (3) 6', 38', 56'

Swansea.com Stadium
Attendance: 4,052
Referee: Eoghan Cross

25 September 2022
15:00

Dragons (Wales)	23–17	(Ireland) Munster
Try: Dyer 71'; Pen: Hanrahan (6) 9', 15', 22', 26', 34', 80'	Report	Try: Archer 36'; Healy 39'; Con: Healy (2) 36', 40'; Pen: Healy 2'

Rodney Parade
Attendance: 4,269
Referee: Sam Grove-White

=== Round 3 ===
30 September 2022
18:30

(1BP) Bulls (South Africa)	28–14	(Ireland) Connacht
Try: Arendse 6'; Burger (2) 9', 45'; Coetzee 39'; Con: Goosen (4) 7', 10', 40', 46'	Report	Try: Aungier 67'; Hawkshaw 72'; Con: Hawkshaw (2) 67', 73'

Loftus Versfeld Stadium
Attendance: 9,228
Referee: Andrea Piardi

30 September 2022
19:35

(1BP) Ulster (Ireland)	13–20	(Ireland) Leinster
Try: Andrew 61'; Con: Cooney 63'; Pen: Cooney (2) 18', 72'	Report	Try: Baird 7'; Sheehan; Con: R. Byrne (2) 9', 22'; Pen: R. Byrne (2) 36', 45'

Kingspan Stadium
Attendance: 14,477
Referee: Andrew Brace

30 September 2022
19:35

Cardiff (Wales)	18–31	(South Africa) Lions (1BP)
Try: Botham 36'; Lewis-Hughes 67'; Con: Evans 37'; Pen: Evans (2) 9', 25'	Report	Try: Penalty try 40'; Botha 49'; Van den Berg 63'; Q. Horn 77'; Con: Lombard (3) 50', 64', 77'; Pen: Lombard 29'

Cardiff Arms Park
Attendance: 6,260
Referee: Sam Grove-White

1 October 2022
14:00

(1BP) Stormers (South Africa)	34–18	(Scotland) Edinburgh
Try: Fourie 41'; Dweba 42'; Hartzenberg (2) 67', 80'; Con: Libbok (4) 42', 44', 68', 82'; Pen: Libbok (2) 48', 64'	Report	Try: Schoeman 28'; Cherry 75'; Con: Kinghorn 29'; Pen: Kinghorn (2) 5', 52'

Cape Town Stadium
Attendance: 10,616
Referee: Frank Murphy

1 October 2022
15:05

(1BP) Ospreys (Wales)	32–17	(Scotland) Glasgow Warriors
Try: Giles (2) 29', 47'; North 71'; Morgan-Williams 77'; Con: Anscombe 30'; Walsh (2) 48', 77'; Pen: Anscombe 38'; Walsh 58'	Report	Try: Kebble 79'; Gordon 82'; Con: Kennedy 79'; Miotti 85'; Pen: Jordan 40'

Swansea.com Stadium
Attendance: 4,398
Referee: Jaco Peyper

1 October 2022
17:05

Munster (Ireland)	21–5	(Italy) Zebre Parma
Try: N. Scannell (2) 8', 24'; Knox 17'; Con: Healy (3) 8', 18', 25'	Report	Try: Pani 44'

Musgrave Park
Attendance: 6,485
Referee: AJ Jacobs

1 October 2022
18:05

Benetton (Italy)	34–23	(Wales) Scarlets
Try: Albornoz 29'; Padovani 57'; Menoncello 77'; Con: Albornoz 31'; Smith 57'; Pen: Albornoz (4) 5', 36', 42', 54'; Smith 74'	Report	Try: Kalamafoni 63'; J. Williams 69'; Con: Patchell (2) 64', 69'; Pen: Halfpenny (3) 34', 39', 51'

Stadio Comunale di Monigo
Attendance: 2,701
Referee: Chris Busby

1 October 2022
19:35

(1BP) Dragons (Wales)	19–20	(South Africa) Sharks
Try: Dee 46'; Con: Reed 47'; Pen: Reed (4) 11', 14', 27', 40'	Report	Try: Williams 61'; Abrahams 74'; Con: Chamberlain (2) 62', 75'; Pen: Chamberlain (2) 8', 32'

Rodney Parade
Attendance: 4,069
Referee: Ben Blain

=== Round 4 ===
7 October 2022
19:35

(1 BP) Edinburgh (Scotland)	19–22	(South Africa) Lions
Try: Mata 19'; Graham 51'; Muncaster 59'; Con: Bofelli (2) 52', 60'	Report	Try: Coetzee 35'; Van Wyk 56'; F. Horn 64'; Con: Lombard (2) 57', 65'; Pen: Lombard 74'

The DAM Health Stadium
Attendance: 5,860
Referee: Andrea Piardi

7 October 2022
19:35

Connacht (Ireland)	20–11	(Ireland) Munster
Try: Hansen 7'; Bealham 53'; Boyle 78'; Con: Fitzgerald 79'; Pen: Fitzgerald 61'	Report	Try: Campbell 23'; Pen: Healy (2) 39', 47'

The Sportsground
Attendance: 7,512
Referee: Chris Busby

8 October 2022
16:00

Zebre Parma (Italy)	20–37	(South Africa) Stormers (1 BP)
Try: Cook 37'; Neculai 41'; Con: Eden (2) 39', 42'; Pen: Eden (2) 58', 64'	Report	Try: Pokomela 4'; Fouché 34'; Jantjies 49'; Mngomezulu 78'; Con: Mngomezulu (4) 5', 35', 50', 79'; Pen: Mngomezulu (3) 15', 61', 67'

Stadio Sergio Lanfranchi
Attendance: 2,500
Referee: Eoghan Cross

8 October 2022
17:05

(1 BP) Leinster (Ireland)	54–34	(South Africa) Sharks (1 BP)
Try: Jenkins 3'; Ringrose (2) 24', 37'; Porter 46'; Henshaw 59'; Russell 68'; Sexton 68'; McKee 75'; Con: Sexton (7) 4', 25', 38', 47', 61', 66', 70'	Report	Try: Fassi (2) 9', 72'; Kok 30'; Abrahams (2) 24', 72'; Con: Chamberlain (2) 10', 56'; Fleurs 73'; Pen: Chamberlain 23'

RDS Arena
Attendance: 16,844
Referee: Craig Evans

8 October 2022
17:15

(1 BP) Scarlets (Wales)	10–16	(Wales) Cardiff
Try: McNicholl 71'; Con: Halfpenny 72'; Pen: Halfpenny 22'	Report	Try: Tomos Williams 24'; Con: Evans 25'; Pen: Evans (3) 6', 46', 51'

Parc y Scarlets
Attendance: 7,182
Referee: Adam Jones

8 October 2022
19:35

(1 BP) Ulster (Ireland)	47–17	(Wales) Ospreys
Try: Marshall (2) 1', 33'; Andrew 7'; Carter (2) 22', 64'; McCloskey 41'; Marcus Rea 75'; Con: Cooney (6) 2', 8', 23', 34', 66', 76'	Report	Try: J. Morgan 12'; Morris 82'; Con: Walsh (2) 13', 82'; Pen: Walsh 27'

Kingspan Stadium
Attendance: 11,517
Referee: Ben Blain

8 October 2022
19:35

(1 BP) Glasgow Warriors (Scotland)	35–21	(South Africa) Bulls
Try: Fagerson 6'; Cancelliere 10'; Cummings 22'; Horne 35'; McKay 47'; Con: Horne (5) 6', 12', 23', 37', 48'	Report	Try: Arendse 18'; B. du Plessis 58'; Swanepoel 79'; Con: Smith (3) 19', 59', 80'

Scotstoun Stadium
Attendance: 5,855
Referee: Andrew Brace

9 October 2022
15:45

(1 BP) Benetton (Italy)	34–14	(Wales) Dragons
Try: Nicotera 12'; Cannone; Padovani 61'; Bellini 69'; Con: Albornoz (4) 13', 21', 62', 70'; Pen: Albornoz (2) 8', 50'	Report	Try: Dyer 46'; Hughes 66'; Con: Hanrahan 47'; S. Davies 66'

Stadio Comunale di Monigo
Attendance: 3,498
Referee: Sam Grove-White

=== Round 5 ===
14 October 2022
19:35

Ospreys (Wales)	16–16	(South Africa) Stormers
Try: Baldwin 75'; Con: Myler 76'; Pen: Myler (3) 35', 50', 68'	Report	Try: De Wet 53'; Con: Libbok 55'; Pen: Libbok (3) 12', 29', 71'

Swansea.com Stadium
Attendance: 4,908
Referee: Gianluca Gnecchi

14 October 2022
19:35

Connacht (Ireland)	0–10	(Ireland) Leinster
	Report	Try: Foley 2'; Con: R. Byrne 4'; Pen: Frawley 76'

Galway Sportsgrounds
Attendance: 6,997
Referee: Frank Murphy

15 October 2022
13:00

(2 BP) Lions (South Africa)	37–39	(Ireland) Ulster (1 BP)
Try: F. Horn (2) 16', 76'; Tshituka 32'; Coetzee 61'; Q. Horn 65'; Con: Lombard 17'; Hendrikse (2) 66', 77'; Pen: Lombard (2) 7', 26'	Report	Try: Baloucoune 1'; Burns 39'; Lyttle 41'; McCloskey 46'; Herring 52'; Con: Cooney (3) 2', 42', 47'; Doak 53'; Pen: Cooney 9'; Doak 74'

Ellis Park Stadium
Attendance: 6,419
Referee: Ben Blain

15 October 2022
15:05

(1 BP) Sharks (South Africa)	40–12	(Scotland) Glasgow Warriors
Try: Volmink (2) 33', 52'; Mbonambi 60'; Fassi; Kok 84'; Con: Chamberlain (3) 34', 62', 69'; Pen: Chamberlain (3) 13', 23', 55'	Report	Try: Gordon (2) 14', 42'; Con: Jordan 15'

Kings Park Stadium
Attendance: 13,657
Referee: Chris Busby

15 October 2022
17:15

(1 BP) Cardiff (Wales)	31–14	(Wales) Dragons
Try: Adams 12'; Carré 15'; Botham 29'; Young 72'; Con: Evans (4) 13', 16', 30', 73'; Pen: Evans 71'	Report	Try: O'Brien 23'; Roberts 49'; Con: Hanrahan (2) 24', 50'

Cardiff Arms Park
Attendance: 8,161
Referee: Craig Evans

15 October 2022
17:15

(1 BP) Edinburgh (Scotland)	53–8	(Italy) Benetton
Try: Skinner 30'; Crosbie 39'; Schoeman 43'; Van der Merwe (2) 45', 70'; Graham (2) 51', 80'; Nel 55'; Boffelli 61'; Con: Boffelli (4) 40', 46', 56', 70'	Report	Try: Halafihi 73'; Pen: Albornoz 2'

DAM Health Stadium
Attendance: 5,862
Referee: Marius van der Westhuizen

15 October 2022
19:35

(1 BP) Scarlets (Wales)	36–12	(Italy) Zebre Parma
Try: Costelow (2) 5', 42'; Lousi 28'; J. Davies 39'; Conbeer 78'; Con: Halfpenny (4) 7', 29', 40', 43'; Pen: Halfpenny 72'	Report	Try: Pelser 13'; Pani 52'; Con: Prisciantelli 53'

Parc y Scarlets
Attendance: 5,597
Referee: Morné Ferreira

15 October 2022
19:35

(1 BP) Munster (Ireland)	31–17	(South Africa) Bulls
Try: G. Coombes (2) 28', 35'; Loughman 42'; Beirne 61'; Con: Carbery (4) 29', 36', 43', 62'; Pen: Carbery 21'	Report	Try: WJ Steenkamp 50'; Kriel 64'; Con: C. Smith (2) 51', 65'; Pen: Goosen 10'

Thomond Park
Attendance: 12,218
Referee: Mike Adamson

=== Round 6 ===
21 October 2022
19:30

Benetton (Italy)	22–44	(South Africa) Bulls (1 BP)
Try: Zuliani 54'; Con: Albornoz 55'; Pen: Albornoz (5) 11', 20', 37', 47', 57'	Report	Try: Nortjé 44'; Louw 50'; Wessels 71'; Coetzee 75'; Jacobs 79'; Con: C. Smith (5) 44', 50', 72', 77', 80'; Pen: C. Smith (3) 35', 42', 63'

Stadio Comunale di Monigo
Attendance: 3,526
Referee: Frank Murphy

21 October 2022
21:35

(1 BP) Connacht (Ireland)	36–14	(Wales) Scarlets
Try: N. Murray 0'; Hansen (2) 34', 76'; Aungier 53'; Penalty try 73'; Pen: Carty (2) 6', 28'; Hawkshaw 60'	Report	Try: Steff Evans 14'; Pen: Costelow (2) 4', 30'; Patchell 58'

Galway Sportsgrounds
Attendance: 4,100
Referee: Marius van der Westhuizen

22 October 2022
15:00

Zebre Parma (Italy)	19–38	(Scotland) Edinburgh (1 BP)
Try: Fusco 49'; Rizzoli 67'; Trulla 77'; Con: Prisciantelli (2) 68', 78'	Report	Try: McBurney (2) 6', 25'; Hodgson 13'; Goosen 20'; Immelman 41'; Currie 70'; Con: Boffelli (4) 7', 22', 27', 71'

Stadio Sergio Lanfranchi
Attendance: 2,000
Referee: Craig Evans

22 October 2022

Lions (South Africa)	P–P	(Scotland) Glasgow Warriors
	Postponed because of illness.

Ellis Park Stadium

22 October 2022

Sharks (South Africa)	P–P	(Ireland) Ulster
	Postponed because of illness.

Kings Park Stadium

22 October 2022
17:15

(1 BP) Leinster (Ireland)	27–13	(Ireland) Munster
Try: Penny 27'; Sheehan 49'; McGrath 61'; Russell 76'; Con: Sexton (2) 28', 50'; Pen: Sexton 57'	Report	Try: L. Coombes 45'; Con: Carbery 46'; Pen: Carbery (2) 21', 33'

Aviva Stadium
Attendance: 45,436
Referee: Andy Brace

22 October 2022
19:35

Cardiff (Wales)	30–24	(South Africa) Stormers (2 BP)
Try: Cabango 16'; Harries 42'; Con: Priestland 44'; Pen: Priestland (6) 9', 15', 33', 52', 69', 80'	Report	Try: Xaba (2) 20', 48'; Zas 27'; Pokomela 60'; Con: Libbok (2) 22', 27'

Cardiff Arms Park
Attendance: 6,723
Referee: Mike Adamson

23 October 2022
15:00

(1 BP) Dragons (Wales)	32–25	(Wales) Ospreys (1 BP)
Try: Wainwright 23'; Penalty try 37'; Roberts 43', Dyer (2) 47', 74'; Con: Hanrahan 44'; Pen: Hanrahan 17'	Report	Try: North 0'; Baldwin 26'; Watkin 78'; Con: Walsh (2) 2', 78'; Pen: Walsh (2) 14', 54'

Rodney Parade
Attendance: 6,031
Referee: Adam Jones

=== Round 7 ===
28 October 2022
19:35

(1 BP) Glasgow Warriors (Scotland)	37–0	(Italy) Benetton
Try: Vailanu (2) 9', 57'; Cancelliere 35'; McDowall 39'; F. Brown 48'; McLean 72'; Con: Miotti (2) 37', 40'; Pen: Miotti 28'	Report

Scotstoun Stadium
Attendance: 6,035
Referee: Craig Evans

28 October 2022
19:35

Scarlets (Wales)	5–35	(Ireland) Leinster (1 BP)
Try: Steff Evans 20'	Report	Try: Cosgrave 0'; Russell 24'; Clarkson 47'; Penalty try (2) 59', 72'; Con: R. Byrne (3) 2', 26', 47'

Parc y Scarlets
Attendance: 6,823
Referee: Andrea Piardi

29 October 2022
15:00

Lions (South Africa)	22–31	(South Africa) Stormers (1 BP)
Try: Van Wyk 35'; Con: Hendrikse 36'; Pen: Hendrikse (5) 2', 5', 16', 24', 31'	Report	Try: Davids 9'; Mngomezulu 54'; Blommetjies; Xaba 75'; Con: Libbok (4) 9', 55', 69', 76'; Pen: Libbok 21'

Ellis Park Stadium
Attendance: 8,592
Referee: Cwengile Jadezweni

29 October 2022
17:15

(1 BP) Dragons (Wales)	47–7	(Italy) Zebre Parma
Try: R. Williams 8'; Richards (2) 27', 65'; Hughes 46'; O'Brien 56'; Con: S. Davies (5) 9', 27', 47', 57', 66'; Pen: S. Davies (4) 4', 16', 31', 38'	Report	Try: Krumov 32'; Con: Eden 33'

Rodney Parade
Attendance: 4,069
Referee: Ben Blain

29 October 2022
17:15

(1 BP) Munster (Ireland)	14–15	(Ireland) Ulster
Try: S. Daly 66'; Pen: Crowley (3) 9', 48', 53'	Report	Try: Murphy 4'; Stewart 13'; Hume

Thomond Park
Attendance: 15,260
Referee: Frank Murphy

29 October 2022
19:35

(1 BP) Ospreys (Wales)	19–22	(Ireland) Connacht
Try: Sutton 2'; Morgan-William 8'; Parry 68'; Con: Walsh (2) 3', 69'	Report	Try: Wootton 33'; Blade 38'; Porch 42'; Con: Carty (2) 24', 38'; Drop: Carty 63'

Swansea.com Stadium
Attendance: 4,242
Referee: Sam Grove-White

30 October 2022
13:00

(1 BP) Bulls (South Africa)	40–27	(South Africa) Sharks
Try: Coetzee 36'; Papier 65'; Jacobs 68'; Wessels 75'; Con: C. Smith (4) 37', 66', 69', 76'; Pen: C. Smith 37', 66', 69', 76'	Report	Try: Potgieter 39'; Fassi 48'; Buthelezi 78'; Con: Chamberlain (3) 40', 49', 79'; Pen: Chamberlain (2) 28', 64'

Loftus Versfeld
Attendance: 20,321
Referee: Marius van der Westhuizen

30 October 2022
15:00

Cardiff (Wales)	17–25	(Scotland) Edinburgh
Try: Young 17'; Penalty try 37'; Con: Evans 17'; Pen: Evans 25'	Report	Try: Muncaster 7'; Crosbie 21'; Courtney 58'; Con: Boffelli (2) 23', 59'; Pen: Boffelli (2) 3', 53'

Cardiff Arms Park
Attendance: 5,550
Referee: Gianluca Gnecchi

=== Round 8 ===
26 November 2022
14:00

(1 BP) Benetton (Italy)	24–17	(Scotland) Edinburgh (1 BP)
Try: Watson 18'; Negri 36'; N. Cannone 48'; Smith 67'; Con: Albornoz 49'; Umaga 68'	Report	Try: Immelman (2) 42', 60'; Con: Savala (2) 44', 61'; Pen: Savala 1'

Stadio Comunale di Monigo
Attendance: 3,660
Referee: Craig Evans

27 November 2022
14:00

Lions (South Africa)	33–25	(Wales) Dragons
Try: Staeuli 32'; Hendrikse 50'; JP Smith 73'; Con: Hendrikse (2) 33', 51'; Lombard 73'; Pen: Hendrikse (3) 4', 12', 41; Drop: Hendrikse 27'	Report	Try: Tomkinson 44'; Benjamin 68'; Hope 79'; Con: Hanrahan (2) 69', 80'; Pen: S. Davies (2) 6', 14'

Ellis Park Stadium
Attendance: 3,894
Referee: Sam Grove-White

26 November 2022
13:30

(1 BP) Bulls (South Africa)	43–26	(Wales) Ospreys (1 BP)
Try: Kriel (2) 6', 32'; Carr 12'; WJ Steenkamp 20'; Louw 42'; Nortjé 69'; Burger 77'; Con: C. Smith (3) 7', 33', 43'; Steyn 70'	Report	Try: Walsh 26'; Thomas-Wheeler 38'; Williams 55'; Henry 74'; Con: Walsh (3) 27', 39', 75'

Loftus Versfeld Stadium
Attendance: 5,573
Referee: Ben Blain

27 November 2022
16:10

Sharks (South Africa)	0–35	(Wales) Cardiff
	Report	Try: Young (2) 39', 49'; Thomas; Con: Evans (2) 41', 58; Pen: Evans (3) 1', 22', 31'

Kings Park Stadium
Attendance: 7,487
Referee: Frank Murphy

26 November 2022
15:15

(1 BP) Leinster (Ireland)	40–5	Glasgow Warriors (Scotland)
Try: Kearney 7'; Russell (3) 10', 22', 71; Milne 55'; McKee 77'; Con: R. Byrne (4) 8', 11', 23', 56'; H. Byrne 78'	Report	Try: Cancelliere 48'

RDS Arena
Attendance: 14,153
Referee: Marius van der Westhuizen

25 November 2022
19:00

(1 BP) Stormers (South Africa)	36–19	(Wales) Scarlets
Try: Jantjies 14'; Zas 17'; Van Rhyn 22'; Dayimani 34'; D. du Plessis 41'; Con: Wolhuter (4) 15', 19', 36', 42'; Pen: Wolhuter 40'	Report	Try: Conbeer (2) 31', 53'; Rogers 49'; Con: D. Jones 32'; Patchell 50'

Cape Town Stadium
Attendance: 9,986

26 November 2022
19:35

(1 BP) Munster (Ireland)	24–17	(Ireland) Connacht (1 BP)
Try: Nash 11'; Salanoa 36'; Ryan 58'; N. Scannell 65'; Con: Carbery (2) 59', 66'	Report	Try: Ralston 26'; Marmion 73'; Con: Carty (2) 27', 73'; Pen: Carty 9'

Thomond Park
Attendance: 16,725
Referee: Gianluca Gnecchi

25 November 2022
19:35

(1 BP) Ulster (Ireland)	36–15	(Italy) Zebre Parma
Try: Stewart (2) 4', 52'; Matty Rea 8'; Reid 35'; S. Moore; Andrew 65'; Con: Doak (3) 9', 36', 42'	Report	Try: Pani 30'; Cronjé 80'; Con: Prisciantelli 81'; Pen: Prisciantelli 13'

Kingspan Stadium
Attendance: 16,741
Referee: AJ Jacobs

=== Round 9 ===
2 December 2022
17:10

Sharks (South Africa)	25–10	(Wales) Ospreys
Try: Notshe 48'; Bosch 76'; J. Venter 80'; Con: Bosch (2) 77', 83'; Pen: Bosch (2) 11', 19'	Report	Try: L. Morgan 44'; Morris 66'

Kings Park Stadium
Attendance: 7,890
Referee: Stephan Geldenhuys

2 December 2022
19:35

Edinburgh (Scotland)	17–38	(Ireland) Munster (1 BP)
Try: Dean 2'; Graham 13'; Ritchie 36'; Con: Kinghorn 3'	Report	Try: Casey 23'; R. Scannell 40'; Nash 41'; Coombes 52'; Carbery 80'; Con: Carbery (5) 24', 40', 42', 53', 80'; Pen: Carbery 64'

DAM Health Stadium
Attendance: 7,339
Referee: Mathieu Raynal

3 December 2022
12:00

(1 BP) Stormers (South Africa)	34–26	(Wales) Dragons (1 BP)
Try: Pokomela 8'; Dweba 15'; Nel 21'; Libbok 35'; Con: Libbok (3) 10', 17', 23'; Blommetjies 37'; Pen: Libbok (2) 50', 57'	Report	Try: J. Williams 40'; Seiuli 46'; Hanrahan 70'; Reynolds 74'; Con: Hanrahan (2) 41', 71'; Reed 75'

Nelson Mandela Bay Stadium
Attendance: 14,378
Referee: Frank Murphy

3 December 2022
13:00

Zebre Parma (Italy)	17–45	(Scotland) Glasgow Warriors (1 BP)
Try: Bruno 19'; Du Toit (2) 70', 76'; Con: Prisciantelli 20'	Report	Try: Manjezi 21'; Cancelliere 45'; McDowall 48'; Matthews (2) 67', 83'; Miotti 74'; Con: Horne (6) 20', 46', 49', 68', 75', 84'; Pen: Horne 40'

Stadio Sergio Lanfranchi
Attendance: 1,800
Referee: Tual Trainini

3 December 2022
15:15

(1 BP) Connacht (Ireland)	38–19	(Italy) Benetton
Try: N. Murray 3'; Boyle 23'; Bealham 43'; Blade 66'; Tierney Martin 80'; Con: Carty (5) 4', 23', 43', 67', 81'; Pen: Carty 36'	Report	Try: Watson 17'; Zanon 53'; Menoncello 78'; Con: Umaga 18', 54'

Galway Sportsgrounds
Attendance: 4,172
Referee: Marius van der Westhuizen

3 December 2022
18:00

(1 BP) Bulls (South Africa)	45–9	(Wales) Cardiff
Try: Moodie (2) 28', 68'; Arendse 39'; Goosen 42'; Nortjé 59'; Louw 76'; Con: Goosen (4) 29. 39', 43 61'; C. Smith (2) 69', 77'; Pen: Goosen 5'	Report	Pen: Evans (3) 1', 12', 31'

Loftus Versfeld Stadium
Attendance: 6,547
Referee: Sam Grove-White

3 December 2022
19:35

(1 BP) Leinster (Ireland)	38–29	(Ireland) Ulster (1 BP)
Try: Kelleher 40'; Ringrose (2) 58', 63'; Porter 73'; Lowe 75'; Con: R. Byrne (5) 42', 59', 63', 73', 76'; Pen: R. Byrne 2'	Report	Try: Herring 21'; Treadwell 28'; McIlroy 34'; Carter 79'; Con: Cooney (2) 22', 29'; Nathan Doak 80'; Pen: Cooney 9'

RDS Arena
Attendance: 15,990
Referee: Christophe Ridley

4 December 2022
11:30

(1 BP) Lions (South Africa)	32–15	(Wales) Scarlets
Try: Maxwane 11'; Tshituka (2) 20', 75'; Kriel 55'; Con: Hendrikse (2) 21', 56'; Du Plessis 76'; Pen: Hendrikse (2) 5', 41'	Report	Try: Davis 32'; Rogers 58'; Lousi 82'

Ellis Park Stadium
Attendance: 4,010
Referee: Ben Blain

=== Round 10 ===
23 December 2022
17:00

(1 BP) Sharks (South Africa)	37–10	(South Africa) Lions
Try: Mapimpi (2) 8', 74'; Chamberlain 15'; Williams 55'; Kolisi 74'; Con: Bosch (2) 10', 56'; Cronjé 76'; Pen: Bosch 43', Cronjé 67'	Report	Try: Van der Merwe 17'; Con: Hendrikse 19; Pen: Hendrikse 45'

Kings Park Stadium
Attendance: 24,721
Referee: Aimee Barrett-Theron

23 December 2022
18:15

(1 BP) Stormers (South Africa)	37–27	(South Africa) Bulls
Try: Penalty try 23'; Dweba 48'; Hartzenberg 49'; Zas 53'; Con: Libbok (3) 49', 50', 54'; Pen: Libbok (3) 3', 10', 71'	Report	Try: Carr 25'; Van Staden 63'; B. du Plessis 78'; Con: Goosen (2) 27', 63'; C. Smith 78'; Pen: Goosen (2) 20', 38'

Cape Town Stadium
Attendance: 30,003
Referee: AJ Jacobs

23 December 2022
17:35

(1 BP) Connacht (Ireland)	20–22	(Ireland) Ulster
Try: Blade 59'; Butler 78'; Byrne 84'; Con: Carty 78'; Pen: Carty 34'	Report	Try: Lyttle 29'; Stewart (2) 44', 53'; Con: Cooney (2) 45', 54'; Pen: Cooney 71'

Galway Sportsgrounds
Attendance: 6,041
Referee: Frank Murphy

23 December 2022
19:35

Glasgow Warriors (Scotland)	16–10	(Scotland) Edinburgh (1 BP)
Try: Dempsey 28'; Con: Horne 29'; Pen: Horne 41'; Jordan (2) 66', 74'	Report	Try: Boyle 57'; Con: Boffelli 58'; Pen: Van der Walt 79'

Scotstoun Stadium
Attendance: 7,338
Referee: Ben Blain

24 December 2022
12:30

(1 BP) Benetton (Italy)	38–5	(Italy) Zebre Parma
Try: Albornoz 12'; N. Cannone 30'; L. Cannone 38'; Smith 52'; Nicotera 55'; Favretto 75'; Con: Smith (4) 14', 39', 54', 76'	Report	Try: Bigi 65'

Stadio Comunale di Monigo
Attendance: 3,683
Referee: Andrea Piardi

26 December 2022
14:15

(1 BP) Dragons (Wales)	24–29	(Wales) Cardiff (1 BP)
Try: Dyer 38'; Keddie 64'; Con: Hanrahan 66'; Pen: Hanrahan (4) 21', 25', 57', 71'	Report	Try: T. Williams (2) 32', 51'; Adams 34'; Domachowski 79'; Con: Evans (3) 32, 35, 80'; Pen: Evans 60'

Rodney Parade
Attendance: 8,582
Referee: Ben Whitehouse

26 December 2022
17:15

(1 BP) Ospreys (Wales)	34–14	(Wales) Scarlets
Try: Cuthbert 14'; L. Morgan 23'; Webb 33'; Parry 67'; K. Williams 81'; Con: O. Williams (2) 24', 69'; Webb 34'; Pen: O. Williams 52'	Report	Try: Kalamafoni 30'; McNicholl 48'; Con: Patchell (2) 31', 50'

Swansea.com Stadium
Attendance: 11,480
Referee: Craig Evans

26 December 2022
19:35

(1 BP) Munster (Ireland)	19–20	(Ireland) Leinster
Try: G. Coombes 30; Penalty try 43'; Campbell 63'; Con: Carbery 30'	Report	Try: Penny 48'; Sheehan 52'; Con: R. Byrne (2) 48', 54'; Pen: R. Byrne (2) 2', 19'

Thomond Park
Attendance: 25,600
Referee: Chris Busby

=== Round 11 ===
30 December 2022
19:35

(1 BP) Edinburgh (Scotland)	25–32	(Scotland) Glasgow Warriors (1 BP)
Try: Ritchie 10'; Crosbie 26'; Harrison 79'; Con: Boffelli (2) 10', 27'; Pen: Boffelli (2) 14', 42'	Report	Try: Steyn 5'; M. Fagerson 34'; Jordan 55'; Horne 68'; Con: Jordan (2) 6', 56'; Horne 69'; Pen: Horne (2) 66', 73'

Murrayfield Stadium
Attendance: 25,137
Referee: Sam Grove-White

31 December 2022
12:30

Zebre Parma (Italy)	17–40	(Italy) Benetton (1 BP)
Try: Cronjé 1'; Trulla 6'; Con: Eden (2) 1', 7'; Pen: Eden 39'	Report	Try: Zuliani 28'; Ruzza (3) 43', 53', 76'<VR />Menoncello 67'; Zani 71'; Con: Umaga (3) 29', 44', 54'; Albornoz (2) 68', 77'

Stadio Sergio Lanfranchi
Attendance: 2,433

31 December 2022
14:45

(1 BP) Sharks (South Africa)	47–20	(South Africa) Bulls
Try: Williams 39'; Mbonambi 45'; Janse van Rensburg (2) 50', 81'; Con: Bosch (4) 40', 47', 51', 82'; Pen: Bosch (4) 8', 16', 27', 61'	Report	Try: Moodie 18'; Penalty try 30'; Goosen 57'; Con: C. Smith (2) 19', 58'; Pen: C. Smith (2) 1', 14'

Kings Park Stadium
Attendance: 25,813
Referee: Marius van der Westhuizen

31 December 2022
17:00

(1 BP) Stormers (South Africa)	40–8	(South Africa) Lions
Try: Willemse 6'; Fourie 12'; D. du Plessis 27'; Davids (2) 53', 66'; Theunissen 78'; Con: Manie Libbok (5) 7', 28', 55', 67', 79'	Report	Try: Van Wyk 49'; Pen: Hendrikse 18'

Cape Town Stadium
Attendance: 16,001
Referee: Morné Ferreira

1 January 2023
15:00

(1 BP) Cardiff (Wales)	19–22	(Wales) Ospreys
Try: Lane 4'; Belcher 28'; Adams 67'; Con: Evans (2) 5', 68'	Report	Try: Parry 21'; O. Williams 43'; Lake 53'; Con: O. Williams (2) 22', 54'; Pen: O. Williams 77'

Cardiff Arms Park
Attendance: 12,121
Referee: Adam Jones

1 January 2023
17:15

(1 BP) Ulster (Ireland)	14–15	(Ireland) Munster
Try: Baloucoune 67'; Pen: Cooney (3) 15', 19', 24'	Report	Try: Patterson 44'; Healy 79'; Con: Healy 80'; Pen: Healy 73'

Ravenhill Stadium
Attendance: 16,672
Referee: Andrew Brace

1 January 2023
17:15

Scarlets (Wales)	33–17	(Wales) Dragons
Try: Steff Evans 22'; Blacker 58'; McNicholl 81'; Con: Halfpenny (3) 23', 59', 83'; Pen: Halfpenny (4) 4', 11', 38', 48'	Report	Try: O'Brien 18'; L. Jones 33'; Con: Hanrahan (2) 19', 35'; Pen: Hanrahan 14'

Parc y Scarlets
Attendance: 8,566
Referee: Ben Whitehouse

1 January 2023
19:35

(1 BP) Leinster (Ireland)	41–12	(Ireland) Connacht
Try: Turner 2'; Deeny 21'; Larmour (2) 31', 44'; Russell 68'; Baird 71'; Van der Flier 75'; Con: Sexton (2) 23', 32'; H. Byrne 72'	Report	Try: Hawkshaw 16'; Farrell 36'; Con: Carty 16'; Pen: Carty 51'

RDS Arena
Attendance: 17,560
Referee: Eoghan Cross

=== Round 12 ===
6 January 2023
19:35

Dragons (Wales)	14–29	(South Africa) Bulls
Try: Roberts 24'; Clark 34'; Con: S. Davies (2) 25', 35'	Report	Try: Arendse 3'; Penalty try 15'; Vorster 59'; B. du Plessis 64'; Con: Goosen (2) 5', 60'; Pen: Goosen 15'

Rodney Parade
Attendance: 4,039
Referee: Mike Adamson

6 January 2023
19:35

(1 BP) Munster (Ireland)	33–3	(South Africa) Lions
Try: Buckley (2) 9', 79'; O'Donoghue 28'; Patterson 48'; L. Coombes 74'; Con: Healy (4) 30', 49', 76', 81'	Report	Pen: Hendrikse 5'

Musgrave Park
Attendance: 8,008
Referee: Hollie Davidson

7 January 2023
14:00

Benetton (Italy)	31–29	(Ireland) Ulster (2 BP)
Try: Albornoz 13'; Ratave 18'; Brex 63'; Con: Albornoz (2) 14', 19'; Pen: Albornoz 36'; Smith (2) 59', 77'; Drop: Albornoz 42'	Report	Try: O'Sullivan 8'; Herring 54'; Lowry 67'; Penalty try 74'; Con: Cooney (2) 9', 68'; Pen: Cooney 40'

Stadio Comunale di Monigo
Attendance: 4,218
Referee: Ben Whitehouse

7 January 2023
15:00

(1 BP) Edinburgh (Scotland)	24–17	(Italy) Zebre Parma
Try: Shiel 17'; Blain 21'; Boyle; Harrison 78'; Con: Kinghorn (2) 70', 80'	Report	Try: Gesi (2) 43', 50'; Eden 66'; Con: Eden 67'

DAM Health Stadium
Attendance: 5,193
Referee: Aimee Barrett-Theron

7 January 2023
17:15

(1 BP) Cardiff (Wales)	22–28	(Wales) Scarlets
Try: Taletau 35'; Carré 47'; Adams 62'; Con: Evans (2) 36', 49'; Pen: Evans 1'	Report	Try: Blacker 3'; McNicholl 26'; J. Davies 28'; Con: Halfpenny (2) 4', 30'; Pen: Halfpenny (3) 44', 51', 71'

Cardiff Arms Park
Attendance: 10,486
Referee: Joy Neville

7 January 2023
17:15

(1 BP) Connacht (Ireland)	24–12	(South Africa) Sharks
Try: Oliver 19'; Forde (2) 23', 55'; O'Halloran 39'; Con: Carty (2) 24', 40'	Report	Try: Janse van Rensburg 60'; Bleuler 77'; Con: Cronjé 61'

Galway Sportsgrounds
Attendance: 4,030
Referee: Adam Jones

7 January 2023
19:35

(1 BP) Ospreys (Wales)	19–24	(Ireland) Leinster
Try: Giles 14'; Con: C. Evans 15'; Pen: C. Evans (4) 10', 43', 54', 72'	Report	Try: Sheehan 36'; Keenan 63'; J. O'Brien 67'; Con: H. Byrne 37'; R. Byrne (2) 64', 69'; Pen: H. Byrne 20'

Swansea.com Stadium
Attendance: 4,428
Referee: Andrea Piardi

8 January 2023
15:00

(1 BP) Glasgow Warriors (Scotland)	24–17	(South Africa) Stormers
Try: Cancelliere (2) 7', 78'; Steyn 16'; Jones 78'; Con: Horne 51'; Miotti 80'	Report	Try: Dweba 13'; Blommetjies 29'; Pokomela 61'; Con: Libbok 14'

Scotstoun Stadium
Attendance: 6,452
Referee: Andrew Brace

=== Round 13 ===
27 January 2023
19:35

(1 BP) Scarlets (Wales)	37–28	(South Africa) Bulls (1 BP)
Try: Davis 9'; Mathias 14'; G. Davies 20'; McNicholl 75'; Con: Costelow (3) 10', 15', 21', 77'; D. Jones 77'; Pen: Costelow (3) 2', 31', 45'	Report	Try: Burger 4'; Jacobs 35'; Brink 54'; Matanzima 61'; Con: C. Smith (4) 5', 36', 55', 62'

Parc y Scarlets
Attendance: 6,971
Referee: Andrew Brace

27 January 2023
19:35

(1 BP) Ulster (Ireland)	35–5	(South Africa) Stormers
Try: Doak 13'; Moxham 20'; Timoney 41'; Toomaga-Allen 45'; Lowry 56'; Con: Doak (4) 14', 21', 42', 46'; Cooney 57'	Report	Try: Venter 76'

Kingspan Stadium
Attendance: 12,216
Referee: Mike Adamson

28 January 2023
14:30

(1 BP) Benetton (Italy)	30–40	(Ireland) Munster (1 BP)
Try: Zanon 6'; Mendy (3) 12', 57', 81'; Con: Umaga (2) 13', 82'; Pen: Umaga (2) 39', 46'	Report	Try: Patterson 16'; O'Sullivan 30'; Hodnett 42'; Kleyn 49'; Frisch 71'; Carbery 76'; Con: Carbery (5) 17', 31', 42', 50', 77'

Stadio Comunale di Monigo
Attendance: 4,288
Referee: Ben Blain

28 January 2023
14:30

(1 BP) Dragons (Wales)	28–42	(Scotland) Glasgow Warriors (1 BP)
Try: R. Williams 15'; Tomkinson 18'; Basham 56'; Coleman 80'; Con: Hanrahan (4) 16', 19', 57', 81'	Report	Try: Forbes', 1'; F. Brown (2) 7', 21'; Weir 40'; McDowall 47'; Cancelliere 73'; Con: Weir (5) 2', 8', 22', 40', 48'; Jordan 74'

Rodney Parade
Attendance: 4,624
Referee: Frank Murphy

28 January 2023
17:05

(1 BP) Leinster (Ireland)	38–14	(Wales) Cardiff
Try: Deegan 6'; McGrath (2) 19', 29'; Denny 48'; O'Reilly 55'; Turner 82'; Con: H. Byrne (4) 20', 30', 50', 83'	Report	Try: Thornton 66'; Dacey 79'; Con: Evans (2) 67', 79'

RDS Arena
Attendance: 13,544
Referee: Jaco Peyper

28 January 2023
17:15

(1 BP) Edinburgh (Scotland)	19–22	(South Africa) Sharks
Try: McBurney (2) 27', 36'; Immelman 38'; Con: Savala (2) 29', 37'	Report	Try: Williams 5'; Potgieter 18'; Van Vuuren 61'; Con: Bosch (2) 6', 19'; Pen: Bosch 42'

DAM Health Stadium
Attendance: 6,791
Referee: James Doleman

28 January 2023
19:35

(1 BP) Connacht (Ireland)	43–24	(South Africa) Lions
Try: Kilgallen 2'; Delahunt 14'; Blade (3) 25', 42', 61'; O'Halloran 35'; Con: Carty (5) 15', 25', 36', 43', 62'; Pen: Carty 7'	Report	Try: Ntlabakanye 10'; Van Wyk 31'; Louw 64'; Con: Hendrikse (3) 11', 32', 65'; Pen: Hendrikse 4'

Galway Sportsgrounds
Attendance: 4,288
Referee: Paul Williams)

29 January 2023
15:00

(2 BP) Zebre Parma (Italy)	24–28	(Wales) Ospreys (1 BP)
Try: Van Wyk 19'; Fox-Matamua (2) 29', 34'; Andreani 49'; Con: Eden (2) 30', 35'	Report	Try: Deaves 1'; Thomas-Wheeler 5'; Morris 63'; Morgan-Williams 68'; Con: Walsh (2) 2', 6'; Myler (2) 65', 69'

Stadio Sergio Lanfranchi
Attendance: 2,200
Referee: Eoghan Cross

=== Round 1 (rescheduled match) ===
4 February 2023
14:00

Sharks (South Africa)	19–46	(South Africa) Stormers (1 BP)
Try: Grobler (2) 38', 69'; Jooste 62'; Con: Bosch (2) 23', 63'	Report	Try: Jantjies 1'; Van Heerden 17'; Dweba 31'; Senatla 41'; Hartzenberg 48'; Libbok 57'; Con: Blommetjies 2'; Libbok (4) 18', 33', 42', 49'; Pen: Libbok (2) 25', 74'

Kings Park Stadium
Attendance: 23,787
Referee: Jaco Peyper

=== Round 14 ===
17 February 2023
19:35

(1 BP) Munster (Ireland)	58–3	(Wales) Ospreys
Try: Coombes (3) 14', 52', 79'; Fekitoa 18'; Frisch 29'; Carbery 36'; Patterson 40'; Zebo 62'; Daly 68'; Con: Carbery (5) 15', 37', 53', 68', 79'; Pen: Carbery 12'	Report	Pen: Myler 3'

Thomond Park
Attendance: 14,082
Referee: Gianluca Gnecchi

17 February 2023
19:35

Glasgow Warriors (Scotland)	17–11	(Ireland) Ulster (1 BP)
Try: Vailanu 17'; Dempsey 63'; Brown 74'; Con: Weir 76'	Report	Try: Sheridan 28'; Pen: Doak 41'; Cooney 82'

Scotstoun Stadium
Attendance: 7,338
Referee: Craig Evans

18 February 2023
13:00

Lions (South Africa)	7-29	(South Africa) Sharks (1 BP)
Try: Louw 33'; Con: Lombard 34'	Report	Try: Bosch 26'; Abrahams 48'; Mbatha 66'; Williams 73'; Con: Bosch (3) 27', 50', 74'; Pen: Bosch 58'

Ellis Park
Attendance: 8,235
Referee: Cwengile Jadezweni

18 February 2023
15:05

(1 BP) Bulls (South Africa)	19–23	(South Africa) Stormers
Try: Nkosi 64'; Con: Steyn 65'; Pen: Smith (4) 6', 11', 15', 24'	Report	Try: Theunissen 27'; Pokomela 51'; Con: Libbok (2) 28', 53'; Pen: Libbok (2) 13', 38'; Drop: Libbok 72'

Loftus Versfeld Stadium
Attendance: 41,205
Referee: Marius van der Westhuizen

18 February 2023
15:05

(1 BP) Zebre Parma (Italy)	34–57	(Ireland) Connacht (1 BP)
Try: Gesi (2) 33', 60'; Cronjé 44'; Furno 54'; Con: Eden (4) 34', 46', 56', 61', Pen: Eden (2) 9', 13'	Report	Try: Tierney-Martin (3) 5', 23', 26'; O'Halloran 30'; Blade 37'; Kilgallen 42'; Byrne 72'; Marmion 76' de Buitléar 80'; Con: Carty (6) 6', 28', 38', 43', 73', 77'

Stadio Sergio Lanfranchi
Attendance: 2,000
Referee: Ben Whitehouse

18 February 2023
17:15

(1 BP) Scarlets (Wales)	42–14	(Scotland) Edinburgh
Try: Conbeer (2) 5', 45'; Fifita 11'; Steff Evans 30'; G. Davies 49'; James 75'; Con: Costelow (3) 6', 13', 32'; D. Jones (3) 46', 49', 76'	Report	Try: McCallum 20'; Venter 59'; Con: Savala (2) 21', 59',

Parc y Scarlets
Attendance: 7,531
Referee: Andrea Piardi

18 February 2023
17:15

(1 BP) Cardiff (Wales)	30–13	(Italy) Benetton
Try: Lane (2) 1', 6'; Ratti 49'; Thomas 81'; Con: Thomas (2) 50', 83'; Pen: Thomas (2) 13', 28'	Report	Try: Smith 3'; Zanon 34'; Pen: Albornoz 40'

Cardiff Arms Park
Attendance: 7,008
Referee: Chris Busby

18 February 2023
19:35

(1 BP) Leinster (Ireland)	43–14	(Wales) Dragons
Try: H. Byrne (2) 3', 41'; McGrath 25'; Ruddock 35'; Larmour 46'; Russell 72', Tector 79'; Con: H. Byrne (3) 4', 26', 42'; Tector 73'	Report	Try: R. Williams 32'; Hanrahan 63'; Con: Reed (2) 33', 64'

RDS Arena
Attendance: 12,441
Referee: Mike Adamson

=== Round 6 (rescheduled matches) ===
25 February 2023
14:00

(2 BP) Sharks (South Africa)	24–31	(Ireland) Ulster (1 BP)
Try: Williams 1'; Abrahams 29'; N. Mchunu 51'; Chamberlain 67', Con: Bosch (2) 30', 51	Report (Postponed because of illness)	Try: Stewart (2) 24', 32'; Moore 43'; Sheridan 56'; Con: Cooney (4) 25', 33', 44', 58'; Pen: Cooney 18'

Kings Park Stadium
Attendance: 13,212
Referee: Sam Grove-White

25 February 2023
16:15

(1 BP) Lions (South Africa)	35–24	(Scotland) Glasgow Warriors (1 BP)
Try: Nohamba 21'; Horn 24', Rass 30', van der Merwe; Venter 52'; Con: Lombard (2) 22', 24'; Pen: Lombard (2) 40', 75'	Report (Postponed because of illness)	Try: Caven 7'; Forbes 38'; Jordan 56', Gordon 61'; Con: Jordan (2) 8', 39'

Ellis Park Stadium
Attendance: 8,014
Referee: Adam Jones

=== Round 15 ===
3 March 2023
19:35

(1 BP) Glasgow Warriors (Scotland)	50–8	(Italy) Zebre Parma
Try: Matthews (3) 9', 27', 43'; Du Preez 30'; McDowall 47'; McKay; Gordon 72'; F. Brown 81'; Con: Horne (4) 10', 44', 48', 59'; Weir 73'	Report	Try: Cook 1'; Pen: Trulla 19'

Scotstoun Stadium
Attendance: 6,126
Referee: Chris Busby

3 March 2023
19:35

(1 BP) Munster (Ireland)	49–42	(Wales) Scarlets (2 BP)
Try: Campbell 2'; Nash (2) 12', 64'; Patterson 26'; S. Daly 41'; G. Coombes 49'; Con: Carbery (6) 3', 12', 24', 27', 41', 49'; Crowley 65'	Report	Try: Roberts 34'; Fifita 45'; Kalamafoni 53'; Lousi 60'; G. Davies 70'; Rogers 76'; Con: Costelow (6) 35', 46', 54'60', 70', 77'

Musgrave Park
Attendance: 8,008
Referee: Ben Blain

4 March 2023
12:30

(1 BP) Stormers (South Africa)	29–23	(South Africa) Sharks (1 BP)
Try: Mngomezulu 14'; Dixon 20'; Blommetjies (2) 31', 54'; Con: Libbok (3) 21', 32', 55; Pen: Libbok 82'	Report	Try: Penxe 58'; Janse van Rensburg 65'; Williams 71'; Con: Bosch 66'; Pen: Bosch (2) 8', 19'

Cape Town Stadium
Attendance: 30,701
Referee: AJ Jacobs

4 March 2023
14:45

(2 BP) Bulls (South Africa)	25–29	(South Africa) Lions
Try: Simelane (2) 28', 46'; Nkosi 37'; Grobbelaar 61'; Con: Steyn 62'; Pen: Steyn 1'	Report	Try: Van der Merwe 12'; Nohamba 23'; Con: Nohamba (2) 13', 24'; Pen: Nohamba (5) 6', 17', 32', 65', 69'

Loftus Versfeld Stadium
Attendance: 15,626
Referee: Jaco Peyper

4 March 2023
17:05

(1 BP) Edinburgh (Scotland)	27–47	(Ireland) Leinster (1 BP)
Try: Boffelli (2) 7', 45'; Venter 14'; Skinner 77'; Con: Boffelli 15'; Savala 77'; Pen: Boffelli 18'	Report	Try: Deegan 10'; Penny (2) 23', 57'; Milne (2) 31', 51'; Kearney 42'; Alaalatoa 55'; Con: H. Byrne (6) 12', 23', 32', 52', 56', 58'

DAM Health Stadium
Attendance: 7,240
Referee: Craig Evans

4 March 2023
17:15

(1 BP) Ospreys (Wales)	20–21	(Italy) Benetton
Try: L. Morgan 6'; Parry 73'; Morgan-Williams 81'; Con: Walsh 74'; Pen: Myler 25'	Report	Try: Riera 21'; Watson 51'; Con: Umaga 22'; Pen: Umaga (3) 23', 38 48'

Swansea.com Stadium
Attendance: 5,620
Referee: Andrew Brace

4 March 2023
19:35

(1 BP) Dragons (Wales)	20–22	(Ireland) Connacht
Try: Wainwright 11'; Rosser 41'; Con: Reed (2) 13', 42'; Pen: Reed (2) 23', 47'	Report	Try: Predergast 20'; Butler 50'; Heffernan 60'; Con: Hawkshaw (2) 21', 51'; Pen: Hawkshaw 9'

Rodney Parade
Attendance: 5,113
Referee: Andrea Piardi

4 March 2023
19:35

Cardiff (Wales)	20–42	(Ireland) Ulster (1 BP)
Try: Lane (2) 6', 62'; Summerhill 66'; Con: Evans 67'; Pen: Evans 16'	Report	Try: S. Moore 1'; Stockdale 18'; Doak 24'; Burns 51'; Stewart (2) 60', 72'; Con: Doak (6) 2', 19', 25', 52', 61', 73'

Cardiff Arms Park
Attendance: 6,728
Referee: Hollie Davidson

=== Round 16 ===
24 March 2023
19:10

(2 BP) Zebre Parma (Italy)	30–34	(Wales) Cardiff (1 BP)
Try: Gesi 2'; Krumov 29'; Trulla 68'; Kvesic 73'; Con: Prisciantelli (2) 3', 68'; Pen: Prisciantelli (2) 39', 44'	Report	Try: Botham (2) 21', 27'; Grady 46'; Belcher 51'; Con: Priestland (4) 23', 27', 48', 52'; Pen: Priestland 13'; Evans 66'

Stadio Sergio Lanfranchi
Attendance: 3,000
Referee: Mike Adamson

24 March 2023
19:35

(1 BP) Leinster (Ireland)	22–22	(South Africa) Stormers
Try: Milne 39'; Penny 43'; Russell 53'; Deegan 59'; Con: H. Byrne 59'	Report	Try: Libbok 20'; Hartzenberg 33'; Blommetjies 68'; Con: Libbok (2) 21', 34'; Pen: Libbok 7'

RDS Arena
Attendance: 15,653
Referee: Sam Grove-White

25 March 2023
13:00

(2 BP) Benetton (Italy)	28–32	(South Africa) Lions (1 BP)
Try: Riera 21'; Watson; Maile 33'; Stowers 59'; Con: Umaga (4) 23', 27', 34', 60'	Report	Try: Q. Horn 30'; Tshituka (2) 61', 68'; Maxwane 64'; Con: Nohamba (3) 31', 65', 69'; Pen: Nohamba (2) 17', 42'

Stadio Comunale di Monigo
Attendance: 3,924
Referee: Frank Murphy

25 March 2023
13:00

(1 BP) Ospreys (Wales)	37–18	(Wales) Dragons
Try: Smith 6'; Lydiate 36'; Morris 42'; Hopkins 50'; K. Williams 56'; Con: Walsh 7'; Scully (2) 43', 57'; Pen: Walsh (2) 18', 29'	Report	Try: J. Williams 53'; Pen: Reed 21'; O'Brien 40'

Swansea.com Stadium
Attendance: 7,270
Referee: Jaco Peyper

25 March 2023
15:05

(1 BP) Connacht (Ireland)	41–26	(Scotland) Edinburgh (1 BP)
Try: Forde 7'; Oliver 20'; Blade (3) 39', 61', 63'; Butler 44'; Con: Hawkshaw (2) 21', 45'; Daly (2) 61', 64'; Pen: Hawkshaw 16'	Report	Try: Atalifo 33'; Mata 46'; Young 51'; Kinghorn 77'; Con: Boffelli (3) 34', 47', 77'

Galway Sportsgrounds
Attendance: 6,056
Referee: Ben Whitehouse

25 March 2023
15:05

Scarlets (Wales)	32–20	(South Africa) Sharks
Try: Steff Evans (2) 8', 45'; Con: Costelow (2) 9', 45'; Pen: Costelow (6) 13', 22', 52', 55', 71', 75'	Report	Try: Kolisi 27'; Mbonambi 58'; Con: Bosch (2) 28', 59'; Pen: Bosch (2) 42', 64'

Parc y Scarlets
Attendance: 7,956
Referee: Eoghan Cross

25 March 2023
17:15

(1 BP) Munster (Ireland)	26–38	(Scotland) Glasgow Warriors (1 BP)
Try: G. Coombes 53', c Casey 57', c J. Wycherley 70', c Nash 77', m Con: Carbery (2/2) 53', 57'; Crowley (1/2) 70'	Report	Try: F. Brown 5', c McDowall 24', c Miotti 31', c Forbes 39', c Vailanu 60', c Con: Miotti (5/5) 6', 25', 32', 40', 62'; Drop: Miotti (1/1) 44'

Thomond Park
Attendance: 17.097
Referee: Andrea Piardi (FIR)

25 March 2023
19:35

(1 BP) Ulster (Ireland)	32–23	(South Africa) Bulls
Try: Baloucoune 2'; Stewart (3) 25', 42', 54'; Con: Doak (3) 26', 43', 54'; Pen: Doak 72'; Cooney 79'	Report	Try: Arendse 19'; Burger 32'; Con: C. Smith (2) 19', 33'; Pen: C. Smith (3) 13', 40', 63'

Ravenhill Stadium
Attendance: 12,196
Referee: Craig Evans

=== Round 17 ===
14 April 2023
17:30

(1 BP) Sharks (South Africa)	43–33	(Italy) Benetton (1 BP)
Try: Tshituka 14'; Williams (2) 31', 54'; Kolisi 41'; Mapimpi (2) 61', 66'; Con: Bosch (5) 15', 32', 42', 56', 67'; Pen: Bosch 79'	Report	Try: Negri 1'; Brex 6'; Riera 50'; Padovani 58'; Albornoz 69'; Con: Albornoz (4) 3', 7', 59', 69'

Kings Park Stadium
Attendance: 14,281
Referee: Ben Whitehouse

14 April 2023
19:35

Glasgow Warriors (Scotland)	12–9	(Wales) Scarlets (1 BP)
Try: Vailanu 35'; F. Brown 54'; Con: Jordan 55'	Report	Pen: D. Jones (3) 5', 12', 49'

Scotstoun Stadium
Attendance: 6,815
Referee: Chris Busby

14 April 2023
19:35

(1 BP) Ulster (Ireland)	40–19	(Wales) Dragons
Try: McCann 7'; Stewart (3) 29', 37', 48'; Timoney 67'; Penalty try 79'; Con: Cooney (4) 9', 38', 50', 68'	Report	Try: O'Brien 11'; Dee 54'; R. Williams 56'; Con: O'Brien 12'; Reed 55'

Ravenhill Stadium
Attendance: 11,972
Referee: Ben Blain

15 April 2023
13:00

(1 BP) Bulls (South Africa)	78–12	(Italy) Zebre Parma
Try: Moodie (3) 2', 29', 63'; Papier (2) 4', 21'; Vermaak (2) 35', 60'; Steenekamp 48'; Van Staden 69'; B. du Plessis 73'; C. Smith 79'; Con: Goosen (1) 5', 22', 30', 36', 49', 61', 64', 70', 74', 80'; Pen: Goosen 40'	Report	Try: Kriel 11'; Cook 56'; Con: Eden 57'

Loftus Versfeld Stadium
Attendance: 8,120
Referee: Hollie Davidson

15 April 2023
15:05

(2 BP) Lions (South Africa) (1 BP)	36–39	(Ireland) Leinster
Try: Van der Merwe 13'; Lombard 25'; Louw 32'; F. Horn 36'; Con: Nohamba (3) 26', 33', 37'; Pen: Nohamba 49'	Report	Try: Abdaladze 1'; Turner 29'; Milne 45'; Russell 68'; Cosgrave 74'; Con: Prendergast (4) 2', 31', 46', 74'; Pen: Prendergast (2) 62', 80'

Ellis Park Stadium
Attendance: 10,000
Referee: Mike Adamson

15 April 2023
17:15

(2 BP) Stormers (South Africa)	24–26	(Ireland) Munster (1 BP)
Try: Malherbe 29'; Nel (2) 43', 81'; Kitshoff 65'; Con: Libbok (2) 43', 81'	Report	Try: Barron (2) 1', 21'; Daly 57'; G. Coombes 73'; Con: Crowley 2'; Healy (2) 58', 73'

Cape Town Stadium
Attendance: 15,228
Referee: Craig Evans

15 April 2023
19:35

(1 BP) Edinburgh (Scotland)	45–21	(Wales) Ospreys
Try: Vellacot 4'; Cherry 7'; Skinner 16'; Boffelli 19'; Watson 40'; Graham (2) 57', 72'; Con: Boffelli (5) 5', 8', 17', 20', 41'	Report	Try: Lake (2) 10', 47'; Parry; Con: O. Williams (2) 11', 48'; Anscombe 76'

DAM Health Stadium
Attendance: 6,864
Referee: Gianluca Gnecchi

15 April 2023
19:35

(1 BP) Connacht (Ireland)	38–19	(Wales) Cardiff
Try: Kilgallen 12'; Tierney-Martin; Oliver 26'; Hansen 36'; Marmion 75'; Con: Carty (3) 13', 27', 37'	Report	Try: Davies 31'; Young (2) 48', 79'; Con: Priestland (2) 31', 80'

Galway Sportsgrounds
Attendance: 6,343
Referee: Sam Grove-White

=== Round 18 ===
21 April 2023
17:30

(1 BP) Stormers (South Africa)	38–22	(Italy) Benetton
Try: Davids 13'; Engelbrecht (2) 41', 42'; Kotze; Blommetjies 58'; Theunissen 65'; Con: Libbok 4'	Report	Try: Izekor 17'; Zuliani 62'; Con: Albornoz 18'; Pen: Albornoz 4'

Danie Craven Stadium
Attendance: 15 000
Referee: Hollie Davidson

21 April 2023
19:35

Ulster (Ireland)	28–14	(Scotland) Edinburgh
Try: Stockdale 25', m Cooney 41', c Timoney 64', c Con: Cooney (2/3) 42', 65'; Pen: Cooney (3/3) 37', 43', 78'	Report	Try: Graham 7', c Nel 75', c Con: Boffelli (2/2) 8', 76'

Ravenhill Stadium
Attendance: 14,641
Referee: Andrea Piardi

22 April 2023
13:00

(1 BP) Lions (South Africa)	50–35	(Italy) Zebre Parma (1 BP)
Try: Nohamba (2) 9', 49'; Van der Merwe (2) 15', 37'; Kriel 31'; Q. Horn 41'; Coetzee 59'; Rijnsburger 66'; Con: Nohamba (5/8) 9', 32', 42', 60', 67'	Report	Try: Gesi (3) 0', 27', 34'; Trulla 68'; Pittinari 72'

Ellis Park Stadium
Attendance: 5,000
Referee: Ben Whitehouse

22 April 2023
15:00

(1 BP) Dragons (Wales)	31–14	(Wales) Scarlets
Try: Dee 3'; J. Williams 6'; Tomkinson 15'; Hughes 80'; Con: O'Brien (4/4) 4', 7', 16', 81'; Pen: O'Brien (1/1) 47'	Report	Try: Hardy 23'; Tuipulotu 69'; Con: Costelow (2/2) 23', 70'

Principality Stadium
Attendance: 41,139
Referee: Jaco Peyper

22 April 2023
15:05

(1 BP) Bulls (South Africa)	62–7	(Ireland) Leinster
Try: Nortjé; Arendse (2) 24', c 32', c Grobbelaar (2) 39', c 41', m Moodie (2) 46', c 60', c Gans 50', m Vorster 58', c Con: Goosen (7/9) 14', 25', 33', 40', 47', 59', 61'; Pen: Goosen (1/1) 6'	Report	Try: Milne 53', c Con: Prendergast (1/1) 54'

Loftus Versfeld Stadium
Attendance: 5,500
Referee: Craig Evans

22 April 2023
17:15

Sharks (South Africa)	22–22	(Ireland) Munster
Try: Mbonambi 5', m Kok 28', c Notshe 38', c Con: Bosch (1/2) 30'; Chamberlain (1/1) 39'; Pen: Chamberlain (1/1) 43'	Report	Try: Penalty try 47'; Nash 53', m Murray 64', c Con: Healy (1/2) 65'; Pen: Crowley (1/1) 15'

Kings Park Stadium
Attendance: 11,000
Referee: Mike Adamson (SRU)

22 April 2023
17:15

Ospreys (Wales)	21–38	(Wales) Cardiff (1 BP)
Try: Parry 45'; Thomas 62'; Lake 68'; Con: Anscombe (3/3) 46', 63', 68'	Report	Try: Young (2) 25', 58'; Llewellyn 29'; Grady 31'; Carré 75'; Con: Priestland (5/5) 25', 30', 32', 58', 77'; Pen: Priestland (1/1) 41'

Principality Stadium
Attendance: 41,139
Referee: Frank Murphy

22 April 2023
7:35pm

(1BP) Glasgow Warriors (Scotland)	29–27	(Ireland) Connacht
Try: Jones; Jordan; Price; Matthews; Con: Jordan x 2 Horne; Pen: Horne	Report	Try: Penalty try Prendergast; Hurley-Langton; Con: Jack Carty x 2 Pen: Jack Carty x 2

Scotstoun Stadium
Attendance: 6,589
Referee: Gianluca Gnecchi

== Knockout stage ==
=== Bracket ===
Quarter-finals
1	(Ireland) Leinster	35
8	(South Africa) Sharks	5
4	(Scotland) Glasgow Warriors	5
5	(Ireland) Munster	14
2	(Ireland) Ulster	10
7	(Ireland) Connacht	15
3	(South Africa) Stormers	33
6	(South Africa) Bulls	21

Semi-finals
1	(Ireland) Leinster	15
5	(Ireland) Munster	16
7	(Ireland) Connacht	25
3	(South Africa) Stormers	43

Final
5	(Ireland) Munster	19
3	(South Africa) Stormers	14

The play-off draw is seeded based on final positions in the regular season league table.

The higher-ranked teams will have home advantage in the quarter-finals, semi-finals and final.

=== Quarter-finals ===
5 May 2023
19:35

Ulster (Ireland)	10–15	(Ireland) Connacht
Try: O'Connor 63'; Con: Cooney 65'; Pen: Cooney 20'	Report	Pen: Carty (5) 24', 33', 40', 44', 75'

Ravenhill Stadium
Attendance: 12,844
Referee: Andrew Brace

6 May 2023
15:30

Stormers (South Africa)	33–21	(South Africa) Bulls
Try: Dayimani 8'; Zas 33'; Davids 47'; Con: Libbok (3) 9', 35', 47'; Pen: Libbok (4) 16', 43', 62', 75'		Try: Brink 38'; Papier 57' du Plessis 80'; Con: Goosen 39'; Smith (2) 58', 80'

Cape Town Stadium
Attendance: 44,106

6 May 2023
17:00

Leinster (Ireland)	35–5	(South Africa) Sharks
Try: Doris 14'; Milne 22'; Larmour 25'; Deegan 51'; Gibson-Park 75'; Con: H. Byrne (4) 15', 23', 25', 52'; R. Byrne 76'		Try: Williams 7'

Aviva Stadium
Attendance: 14,462

6 May 2023
19:35

Glasgow Warriors (Scotland)	5–14	(Ireland) Munster
Try: Steyn 66'		Try: Fekitoa 22'; Frisch 27'; Con: Crowley (2) 23', 28'

Scotstoun Stadium
Attendance: 6,943

=== Semi-finals ===
13 May 2023
16:00

Stormers (South Africa)	43–25	(Ireland) Connacht

Cape Town Stadium
Attendance: 47,261

13 May 2023
17:30

Leinster (Ireland)	15–16	(Ireland) Munster
Try: Jenkins 39'; McCarthy 63'; Con: H. Byrne 40'; Pen: H. Byrne 3'		Try: Beirne 46'; Con: Crowley 47'; Pen: Healy (2) 12', 25'; Drop: Crowley 78'

Aviva Stadium
Attendance: 26,795
Referee: Frank Murphy (MAR)

=== Final ===
27 May 2023
18:30 SAST / 17:30 IST

Stormers (South Africa)	14–19	(Ireland) Munster
Try: Libbok 5'; Fourie 49'; Con: Libbok (2/2) 6', 50'		Try: Barron 9'; Nash 28'; Hodnett 74'; Con: Crowley (2/3) 30', 76'

Cape Town Stadium
Attendance: 56,344
Referee: Andrea Piardi (Italy)

== Leading scorers ==
Note: Flags to the left of player names indicate national team as has been defined under World Rugby eligibility rules, or primary nationality for players who have not yet earned international senior caps. Players may hold one or more non-WR nationalities.

As of 20 May 2024

=== Most points ===
Rank	Player	Club	Points
1	(South Africa) Manie Libbok	Stormers	217
2	(Ireland) John Cooney	Ulster	139
3	(South Africa) Chris Smith	Bulls	153
4	(Ireland) Jack Carty	Connacht	105
5	(South Africa) Curwin Bosch	Sharks	104
6	(Wales) Sam Costelow	Scarlets	102
7	(Wales) Jarrod Evans	Cardiff Blues	101
8	(Argentina) Tomas Albornoz	Benetton	100
9	(Ireland) Joey Carbery	Munster	92
10	(South Africa) Johan Goosen	Bulls	91

=== Most tries ===
Rank	Player	Club	Tries
1	(Ireland) Tom Stewart	Ulster	16
2	(Scotland) Darcy Graham	Edinburgh	12
3	(Ireland) Caolin Blade	Connacht	11
4	(Italy) Simone Gesi	Zebre	10
4	(Ireland) Rob Russell	Leinster	10
4	(Ireland) Gavin Coombes	Munster	10
4	(South Africa) Grant Williams	Sharks	10
8	(Scotland) Fraser Brown	Glasgow Warriors	9
9	(Ireland) Dan Sheehan	Leinster	8
9	(South Africa) Canan Moodie	Bulls	8
9	(Wales) Thomas Young	Cardiff Blues	8

== Attendances by club ==
Attendance was up by 32% in the season, with a regular season average of 9,500 per game. The all-time attendance record for the URC and Pro14/12 was set in the semi-final between the Stormers and Connacht in Cape Town, with 47,261 spectators. The previous record was 47,125 in 2019 at Celtic Park in the final between Glasgow Warriors and Leinster. The record lasted only three weeks as a sell-out crowd of 56,344 watched the 2022–23 final between Stormers and Munster

Regular season

Club	Home games	Total	Average	Highest	Lowest	Capacity
(Italy) Benetton	9	31,263	3,474	4,288	1,971	69%
(South Africa) Bulls	9	114,782	12,754	41,205	4,120	25%
(Wales) Cardiff	9	69,475	7,719	12,121	5,550	63%
(Ireland) Connacht	9	49,539	5,504	7,512	4,030	68%
(Wales) Dragons	9	61,365	6,818	20,569	4,039	59%
(Scotland) Edinburgh	9	75,482	8,387	25,137	5,193	82%
(Scotland) Glasgow	9	58,173	6,464	7,338	5,790	88%
(Ireland) Leinster	9	165,245	18,361	45,436	12,441	83%
(South Africa) Lions	9	58,895	6,544	10,000	2,894	10%
(Ireland) Munster	9	123,493	13,720	25,600	6,485	70%
(Wales) Ospreys	9	66,967	7,441	20,569	4,052	33%
(Wales) Scarlets	9	66,379	7,375	9,582	5,597	50%
(South Africa) Sharks	9	141,847	15,760	25,813	7,487	30%
(South Africa) Stormers	9	151,271	16,808	30,701	9,358	32%
(Ireland) Ulster	9	121,290	13,477	16,741	10,858	75%
(Italy) Zebre	9	19,526	2,215	3,000	1,800	43%

Play-offs

Club	Home games	Total	Average	Highest	Lowest	Capacity
(Scotland) Glasgow	1	6,943	6,943	6,943	6,943	-
(Ireland) Leinster	2	41,257	20,629	26,795	14,462	-
(South Africa) Stormers	3	146,367	48,789	55,000	44,106	-
(Ireland) Ulster	1	12,844	12,844	12,844	12,844	-

== End of Season Awards ==
=== URC Dream Team ===
The 2022–23 United Rugby Championship Dream team is:

Pos		Player	Team
FB	15	(South Africa) Kurt-Lee Arendse	(South Africa) Bulls
RW	14	(Scotland) Darcy Graham	(Scotland) Edinburgh Rugby
OC	13	(Scotland) Sione Tuipulotu	(Scotland) Glasgow
IC	12	(South Africa) Daniel du Plessis	(South Africa) Stormers
LW	11	(Italy) Simone Gesi	(Italy) Zebre Parma
FH	10	(Ireland) Ross Byrne	(Ireland) Leinster
SH	9	(South Africa) Grant Williams	(South Africa) Sharks
N8	8	(Ireland) Gavin Coombes	(Ireland) Munster
OF	7	(Ireland) Scott Penny	(Ireland) Leinster
BF	6	(Tonga) Vaea Fifita	(Wales) Scarlets
RL	5	(Italy) Federico Ruzza	(Italy) Benetton
TP	4	(Ireland) Niall Murray	(Ireland) Connacht
TP	3	(Ireland) Finlay Bealham	(Ireland) Connacht
HK	2	(Ireland) Dan Sheehan	(Ireland) Leinster
LP	1	(South Africa) Steven Kitshoff	(South Africa) Stormers

=== Award winners ===
The 2022–23 URC award winners were:

Award	Winner
Players' Player of the Season	(Ireland) Dan Sheehan (Leinster)
Next-Gen Player of the Season	(Ireland) Tom Stewart (Ulster)
Fans' Player of the Season	(South Africa) Manie Libbok (Stormers)
Golden Boot	(South Africa) Johan Goosen (Bulls)
Top Try Scorer	(Ireland) Tom Stewart (Ulster)
Try of the Season powered by URC.tv	(Argentina) Joaquin Riera (Benetton)
Tackle Machine	(Ireland) John Hodnett (Munster)
Turnover King	(Wales) Thomas Young (Cardiff)
Ironman Award	(South Africa) Quan Horn (Lions)
Coach of the Season	(South Africa) Franco Smith Glasgow
