= 2021 Six Nations Under 20s Championship =

Under 20 Rugby union competition

- Date: 19 June 2021 – 13 July 2021
- Countries: England; France; Ireland; Italy; Scotland; Wales

Tournament statistics
- Grand Slam: England
- Triple Crown: England

The 2021 Six Nations Under 20s Championship was the 14th series of the Six Nations Under 20s Championship, the annual northern hemisphere rugby union championship. Due to the COVID-19 pandemic all the matches were played at Cardiff Arms Park, Cardiff.

The 2020 tournament was suspended with three games left to play, due to the COVID-19 pandemic and cancelled in August with no winner announced.

== Participants ==
Nation	Head coach	Captain
England	Alan Dickens	Jack van Poortvliet
France	Philippe Boher	Nolann Le Garrec
Italy	Massimo Brunello	Luca Andreani
Ireland	Richie Murphy	Alex Kendellen
Scotland	Sean Lineen	Alex Samuel
Wales	Ioan Cunningham	

== Table ==
Position	Nation	Games				Points			Tries		Bonus points		Total points
Position	Nation	Played	Won	Drawn	Lost	For	Against	Diff	For	Against	Tries	Loss	Total points
1	England	5	5	0	0	165	69	96	25	9	5	0	28
2	France	5	4	0	1	150	117	33	19	15	3	0	19
3	Ireland	5	3	0	2	151	100	51	20	14	3	1	16
4	Wales	5	2	0	3	91	153	−62	10	21	1	0	9
5	Italy	5	1	0	4	102	98	4	13	10	1	2	7
6	Scotland	5	0	0	5	67	189	−122	9	.27	0	0	0
Source: Updated: 17 July 2021

Table ranking rules

- Four match points are awarded for a win.
- Two match points are awarded for a draw.
- A bonus match point is awarded to a team that scores four or more tries in a match or loses a match by seven points or fewer. If a team scores four tries in a match and loses by seven points or fewer, they are awarded both bonus points.
- Three bonus match points are awarded to a team that wins all five of their matches (known as a Grand Slam). This ensures that a Grand Slam winning team always ranks over a team who won four matches in which they also were awarded four try bonus points and were also awarded two bonus points in the match that they lost.
- Tie-breakers
  - If two or more teams are tied on match points, the team with the better points difference (points scored less points conceded) is ranked higher.
  - If the above tie-breaker fails to separate tied teams, the team that scored the higher number of total tries in their matches is ranked higher.
  - If two or more teams remain tied for first place at the end of the championship after applying the above tiebreakers, the title is shared between them.

== Fixtures ==
=== Week 1 ===
19 June 2021
14:00

Scotland	7 – 38	Ireland (1 BP)
Try: Gourlay 20'; Con: Scott 20'	Report	Try: Soroka 3'; Penalty try 36'; Illo 42'; Kendellen 56'; Jennings 62'; Osborne 78'; Con: Humphreys 3'; Corkery (2) 62' 78'

Cardiff Arms Park, Cardiff
Referee: Gianluca Gnecchi

FB	15	Ollie Melville
RW	14	Finlay Callaghan		(substituted off) 45'
OC	13	Scott King
IC	12	Elliot Gourlay
LW	11	Michael Gray	(yellow card) 36'
FH	10	Cameron Scott		(substituted off) 60'
SH	9	Murray Redpath		(substituted off) 47'
N8	8	Ben Muncaster
OF	7	Harri Morris	(red card) 41'
BF	6	Archie Smeaton		(substituted off) 61'
RL	5	Alex Samuel		(substituted off) 72'
LL	4	Max Williamson
TP	3	Ollie Frostick		(substituted off) 40' (substituted on) 79'
HK	2	Patrick Harrison		(substituted off) 50'
LP	1	Cole Lamberton		(substituted off) 50'
Replacements:
HK	16	Jamie Drummond		(substituted on) 50'
PR	17	Michael Jones		(substituted on) 50'
PR	18	George Breese		(substituted on) 40' (substituted off) 79'
LK	19	Euan Ferrie		(substituted on) 72'
BR	20	Ollie Leatherbarrow		(substituted on) 61'
BR	21	Ethan McVicker		(substituted on) 47'
WG	22	Christian Townsend		(substituted on) 60'
WG	23	Rhys Tait		(substituted on) 45'
Coach:

FB	15	Jamie Osborne
RW	14	Ben Moxham
OC	13	Shane Jennings
IC	12	Cathal Forde
LW	11	Josh O'Connor	(substituted off) 54'
FH	10	James Humphreys	(substituted off) 29'
SH	9	Conor McKee	(substituted off) 63'
N8	8	Alex Kendellen
OF	7	Oisin McCormack	(substituted off) 58'
BF	6	Alex Soroka	(substituted off) 47'
RL	5	Harry Sheridan
LL	4	Mark Morrissey
TP	3	Sam Illo	(substituted off) 58'
HK	2	Ronan Loughnane	(substituted off) 61'
LP	1	Temi Lasisi	(substituted off) 58'
Replacements:
HK	16	Eoin de Buitlear	(substituted on) 61'
PR	17	Jack Boyle	(substituted on) 58'
PR	18	Mark Donnelly	(substituted on) 58'
LK	19	Donnacha Byrne	(substituted on) 58'
FL	20	Reuben Crothers	(substituted on) 47'
SH	21	Will Reilly	(substituted on) 63'
FH	22	Tim Corkery	(substituted on) 29'
WG	23	Chris Cosgrave	(substituted on) 54'
Coach:
Richie Murphy

19 June 2021
17:00

(1 BP) England	38 – 22	France
	Report

Cardiff Arms Park, Cardiff
Referee: Chris Busby

19 June 2021
20:00

Italy	8 – 25	Wales
	Report

Cardiff Arms Park, Cardiff
Referee: Nika Amashukeli

=== Week 2 ===
25 June 2021
14:00

(1 BP) England	31 – 12	Scotland
	Report

Cardiff Arms Park, Cardiff
Referee: Nika Amashukeli

25 June 2021
17:00

(1 BP) Italy	11 – 13	France
	Report

Cardiff Arms Park, Cardiff
Referee: Adam Leal

25 June 2021
20:00

Wales	12 – 40	Ireland (1 BP)
Try: Mann 46'; McDonough 59'; Con: Costelow 60'	Report	Try: Forde 13'; Cosgrave 24'; Doak 41'; Okeke 68'; Kendellen 78'; Con: Doak (3) 29' 56' 62'; Pen: Doak (3) 14' 25' 79'

Cardiff Arms Park, Cardiff
Referee: Tual Trainini

FB	15	Jacob Beetham
RW	14	Dan John
OC	13	Ioan Evans	(substituted off) 74'
IC	12	Joe Hawkins
LW	11	Carrick McDonough
FH	10	Sam Costelow	(substituted off) 67'
SH	9	Harri Williams	(substituted off) 53'
N8	8	Carwyn Tuipulotu
OF	7	Harri Deaves	(substituted off) 40'
BF	6	Alex Mann
RL	5	Dafydd Jenkins
LL	4	Joe Peard	(substituted off) 40'
TP	3	Nathan Evans	(substituted off) 56'
HK	2	Efan Daniel	(substituted off) 50'
LP	1	Garyn Phillips	(substituted off) 56'
Replacements:
HK	16	Oli Burrows	(substituted on) 50'
PR	17	Theo Bevacqua	(substituted on) 56'
PR	18	Lewys Jones	(substituted on) 56'
LK	19	James Fender	(substituted on) 40'
BR	20	Christ Tshiunza	(substituted on) 40'
BR	21	Ethan Lloyd	(substituted on) 53'
FH	22	Will Reed	(substituted on) 67'
WG	23	Tom Florence
	24	Morgan Richards
CR	25	Eddie James	(substituted on) 74'
	26	Rhys Thomas
Coach:

FB	15	Jamie Osborne
RW	14	Ben Moxham		(substituted off) 72'
OC	13	Shane Jennings	(yellow card) 58'	(substituted on) 69'
IC	12	Cathal Forde
LW	11	Chris Cosgrave		(substituted off) 65'
FH	10	Tim Corkery		(substituted off) 69'
SH	9	Nathan Doak
N8	8	Alex Kendellen
OF	7	Oisin McCormack
BF	6	Donnacha Byrne		(substituted off) 66'
RL	5	Harry Sheridan
LL	4	Alex Soroka		(substituted off) 67'
TP	3	Mark Donnelly		(substituted off) 63'
HK	2	Ronan Loughnane		(substituted off) 69'
LP	1	Jack Boyle		(substituted off) 63'
Replacements:
HK	16	Eoin de Buitlear		(substituted on) 69'
PR	17	George Saunderson		(substituted on) 63'
PR	18	Sam Illo		(substituted on) 63'
LK	19	Mark Morrissey		(substituted on) 67'
BR	20	Reuben Crothers
SH	21	Conor McKee
CR	22	Ben Carson		(substituted on) 72'
CR	23	Jude Postlethwaite		(substituted on) 65'
	24	Fearghail O'Donoghue
BR	25	Daniel Okeke		(substituted on) 66'
FB	26	Conor Rankin
Coach:
Richie Murphy

=== Week 3 ===
1 July 2021
14:00

Scotland	3 – 43	Italy (1 BP)
	Report

Cardiff Arms Park, Cardiff
Referee: Tual Trainini

1 July 2021
17:00

(1 BP) France	36 – 19	Wales
	Report

Cardiff Arms Park, Cardiff
Referee: Gianluca Gnecchi

1 July 2021
20:00

Ireland	15 – 24	England (1 BP)
	Report

Cardiff Arms Park, Cardiff
Referee: Adam Jones

=== Week 4 ===
7 July 2021
14:00

(1 BP) Italy	23 – 30	Ireland (1 BP)
	Report

Cardiff Arms Park, Cardiff
Referee: Sam Grove-White

7 July 2021
17:00

(1 BP) France	45 – 21	Scotland
	Report

Cardiff Arms Park, Cardiff
Referee: Adam Jones

7 July 2021
20:00

Wales	3 – 45	England (1 BP)
	Report

Cardiff Arms Park, Cardiff
Referee: Chris Busby

=== Week 5 ===
13 July 2021
14:00

(1 BP) England	27 – 17	Italy
	Report

Cardiff Arms Park, Cardiff
Referee: Hollie Davidson

13 July 2021
17:00

(1 BP) Ireland	28 – 34	France (1 BP)
	Report

Cardiff Arms Park, Cardiff
Referee: Sam Grove-White

13 July 2021
20:00

Scotland	24 – 32	Wales (1 BP)
	Report

Cardiff Arms Park, Cardiff
Referee: Adam Leal
