= 2020 Six Nations Under 20s Championship =

Rugby union tournament

- Date: 31 January – 13 March 2020
- Countries: England; France; Ireland; Italy; Scotland; Wales

Tournament statistics
- Triple Crown: Ireland
- Matches played: 12

The 2020 Six Nations Under 20s Championship was the 13th series of the Six Nations Under 20s Championship, the annual northern hemisphere rugby union championship. Ireland were the defending champions, having won the 2019 Championship with a Grand Slam.

The tournament was suspended with three games left to play due to the COVID-19 pandemic and cancelled in August with no winner announced. At the point of cancellation, Ireland had beaten the three other Home nations, and as such had won a triple crown, which is officially recognised despite the cancellation of the tournament.

== Participants ==
| Nation | Stadium | | | Head coach | Captain |
| Nation | Home stadium | Capacity | Location | Head coach | Captain |
|---|---|---|---|---|---|
| England | Franklin's Gardens; Kingsholm Stadium | 15,200; 16,115 | Northampton; Gloucester | Alan Dickens | |
| France | Stade des Alpes; Stade Maurice David; Stade Aimé Giral | 20,068; 6,428; 14,593 | Grenoble; Aix-en-Provence; Perpignan | Sébastien Piqueronies | |
| Ireland | Irish Independent Park | 8,008 | Cork | Noel McNamara | David McCann |
| Italy | Stadio Mirabello; Payanini Rugby Centre | 4,500 | Reggio Emilia; Verona | Fabio Roselli | Paolo Garbisi |
| Scotland | Myreside Stadium; Netherdale | 5,500; 4,000 | Edinburgh; Galashiels | Sean Lineen | |
| Wales | Eirias Stadium | 6,080 | Colwyn Bay | Gareth Williams | Jac Morgan |

== Table ==
| Position | Nation | Games | | | | Points | | | Tries | | Bonus points | | Total points |
| Position | Nation | Played | Won | Drawn | Lost | For | Against | Diff | For | Against | Tries | Loss | Total points |
|---|---|---|---|---|---|---|---|---|---|---|---|---|---|
| 1 | Ireland | 3 | 3 | 0 | 0 | 113 | 69 | 44 | 17 | 10 | 3 | 0 | 15 |
| 2 | Scotland | 5 | 2 | 0 | 3 | 147 | 134 | 13 | 20 | 20 | 3 | 2 | 13 |
| 3 | France | 4 | 2 | 0 | 2 | 95 | 84 | 11 | 11 | 12 | 2 | 2 | 12 |
| 4 | England | 4 | 2 | 0 | 2 | 93 | 103 | −10 | 14 | 12 | 2 | 1 | 11 |
| 5 | Wales | 5 | 2 | 0 | 3 | 83 | 138 | −55 | 11 | 18 | 0 | 0 | 8 |
| 6 | Italy | 3 | 1 | 0 | 2 | 65 | 68 | −3 | 8 | 9 | 1 | 1 | 6 |

Table ranking rules

- Four match points are awarded for a win.
- Two match points are awarded for a draw.
- A bonus match point is awarded to a team that scores four or more tries in a match or loses a match by seven points or fewer. If a team scores four tries in a match and loses by seven points or fewer, they are awarded both bonus points.
- Three bonus match points are awarded to a team that wins all five of their matches (known as a Grand Slam). This ensures that a Grand Slam winning team always ranks over a team who won four matches in which they also were awarded four try bonus points and were also awarded two bonus points in the match that they lost.
- Tie-breakers
  - If two or more teams are tied on match points, the team with the better points difference (points scored less points conceded) is ranked higher.
  - If the above tie-breaker fails to separate tied teams, the team that scored the higher number of total tries in their matches is ranked higher.
  - If two or more teams remain tied for first place at the end of the championship after applying the above tiebreakers, the title is shared between them.

== Fixtures ==
=== Week 1 ===
31 January 2020
19:15

| (1 BP) Ireland | 38 – 26 | Scotland (1 BP) |
| Try: Crowley (2) 10' c, 40' c Clarkson 22' c Smith 43' c Ahern 47' m McKee 74' m Con: Crowley (4/5) 11', 24', 40', 44' | Report | Try: Ashman 15' c Blain 33' m Chamberlain 61' c Scott 80' c Con: Chamberlain (3/4) 16', 62', 80' |

Irish Independent Park, Cork
Referee: Gianluca Gnecchi

31 January 2020
19:35

| Wales | 7 – 17 | Italy |

Eirias Stadium, Colwyn Bay

1 February 2020
20:00

| (1 BP) France | 24 – 29 | England (1 BP) |

Stade des Alpes, Grenoble

=== Week 2 ===
7 February 2020
19:15

| (1 BP) Ireland | 36 – 22 | Wales |
| Try: Hernan (2) 1' c, 40' c Kelly 17' c Finlay 23' c Smith 63' m Con: Crowley (4/5) 2', 18', 25' 40'; Pen: Crowley 30' | Report | Try: Knott (2) 35' c, 68' m Penalty try 48'; Con: Costelow 36'; Pen: Costelow 43' |

Irish Independent Park, Cork
Attendance: 4,822
Referee: Nika Amashukeli

7 February 2020
19:30

| (1 BP) Scotland | 17 – 21 | England |

Myreside Stadium, Edinburgh

7 February 2020
20:00

| (1 BP) France | 31 – 19 | Italy |

Stade Maurice David, Aix-en-Provence

=== Week 3 ===
21 February 2020
18:00

| (2 BP) Italy | 29 – 30 | Scotland (1 BP) |

Stadio Mirabello, Reggio Emilia

21 February 2020
19:35

| Wales | 14 – 11 | France (1 BP) |

Eirias Stadium, Colwyn Bay

21 February 2020
19:45

| England | 21 – 39 | Ireland (1 BP) |
| Try: Hammond 8' c Tizard 45' c Dan 55' c Con: Barton (3/3) 9', 47', 56' | Report | Try: Soroka 18' m Hyde 26' c Ahern (2) 34' c, 72' m McIlroy 40' c O'Reilly 51' m Con: Crowley (2/5) 27', 36'; Corkery (1/1) 40'; Pen: Crowley 4' |

Franklin's Gardens, Northampton
Referee: Ben Blain

=== Week 4 ===
6 March 2020
19:15

| Ireland | Cancelled | Italy |

Irish Independent Park, Cork

- Due to the coronavirus pandemic in Italy, this match was postponed, then cancelled.

6 March 2020
19:45

| (1 BP) England | 22 – 23 | Wales |

Kingsholm Stadium, Gloucester
Referee: Pierre-Baptiste Nuchy

6 March 2020
20:00

| (1 BP) Scotland | 22 – 29 | France (1 BP) |

Netherdale, Galashiels
Referee: Adam Jones

=== Week 5 ===
13 March 2020
19:35

| Wales | 17 – 52 | Scotland (1 BP) |

Eirias Stadium, Colwyn Bay

13 March 2020
20:00

| France | Cancelled | Ireland |

Stade Aimé Giral, Perpignan

- Due to the coronavirus pandemic in France, this match was postponed, then cancelled.

15 March 2020
17:30

| Italy | Cancelled | England |

Payanini Rugby Centre, Verona

- Due to the coronavirus pandemic in Italy, this match was postponed, then cancelled.

== See also ==
- 2020 Six Nations Championship
- 2020 Women's Six Nations Championship
