= Paddy Patterson =

Irish rugby union player

- Born: 30 November 1998 (age 27) Dublin, Ireland
- Height: 1.75 m (5 ft 9 in)
- Weight: 75 kg (11.8 st; 165 lb)
- School: Blackrock College
- University: University College Dublin

Rugby union career
- Position(s): Scrum-half, Wing, Fullback
Amateur team(s)
Years	Team	Apps	(Points)
2017–2022	UCD		
2022–	Cork Constitution		
Senior career
Years	Team	Apps	(Points)
2018–2021	Leinster	3	(5)
2021	→ Munster (short-term)	2	(0)
2021–2026	Munster	55	(25)
- Correct as of 21 March 2026
International career
Years	Team	Apps	(Points)
2018	Ireland U20	10	(10)
- Correct as of 21 October 2018

Patrick Patterson (born 30 November 1998) is an Irish rugby union player who is currently not attached to a club.

== Early life ==
He attended Blackrock College, leaving in 2017.

== Professional career ==
=== Leinster ===
Patterson entered the Leinster academy ahead of the 2018–19 season. He made his senior debut in the 2018–19 season, featuring against the Dragons one day after his 20th birthday.

=== Munster ===
Patterson joined Leinster's provincial rivals Munster on a short-term contract in January 2021, where he provided cover for Craig Casey and Conor Murray, who were away with the Ireland squad for the 2021 Six Nations, and the injured Neil Cronin. He made his debut for Munster in their 28–10 win against Welsh side Scarlets in round 15 of the 2020–21 Pro14 on 12 March 2021, coming on as a 65th minute replacement for Shane Daly, and made his first start for the province in their 31–17 win against Italian side Benetton in round 16 one week later, though he was forced to leave the field with an ankle injury in the 37th minute, which subsequently required surgery.

Patterson left Leinster to join year three of Munster's academy programme ahead of the 2021–22 season, and he joined the Munster senior squad on a two-year contract from the 2022–23 season. Patterson started in Munster's historic 28–14 win against a South Africa XV in Páirc Uí Chaoimh on 10 November 2022, earning the player of the match award.

Patterson was released by Munster at the end of the 2025-26 season.

=== Ireland ===
Patterson represented the Ireland under-20s at the 2018 Six Nations Under 20s Championship and at the 2018 World Rugby Under 20 Championship.

== Honours ==
=== Munster ===
- United Rugby Championship
  - Winner (1): 2022–23
