= Liam Coombes =

Irish rugby union player (born 1997)

- Born: 1 May 1997 (age 29) Skibbereen, Ireland
- Height: 1.91 m (6 ft 3 in)
- Weight: 89 kg (14.0 st; 196 lb)
- School: Christian Brothers College
- Notable relative: Gavin Coombes (cousin)

Rugby union career
- Position(s): Wing, Fullback, Centre
Amateur team(s)
Years	Team	Apps	(Points)
- Garryowen
Senior career
Years	Team	Apps	(Points)
2018–	Munster	19	(30)
- Correct as of 17 February 2023
International career
Years	Team	Apps	(Points)
2017	Ireland U20	1	(0)
- Correct as of 8 June 2017

Liam Coombes (born 1 May 1997) is an Irish rugby union player who most recently played as a wing, fullback or centre for United Rugby Championship club Munster.

== Early life ==
Born in Skibbereen, County Cork, Coombes first began playing rugby for his local side Skibbereen RFC alongside his cousin, Gavin Coombes, before playing schools rugby for Christian Brothers College during his leaving cert cycle and winning the Munster Schools Rugby Senior Cup in March 2016 alongside Munster teammate Alex McHenry. Coombes went on to represent Munster at under-18 clubs, under-19, under-20/development and 'A' level.

== Munster ==
Having previously been part the sub-academy, Coombes joined the Munster academy ahead of the 2017–18 season. He made his first non-competitive appearance for Munster in their 32–28 pre-season friendly victory against London Irish on 17 August 2018. Coombes made his full senior debut for Munster in their 2018–19 Pro14 fixture against South African side Cheetahs on 4 November 2018, having been drafted into the starting XV late on after Sammy Arnold failed to recover from concussion, and scored his first try for the province in their 30–26 away win. Coombes joined the Munster senior squad on a one-year contract ahead of the 2020–21 season and extended that deal by a further year in February 2021. He signed a two-year contract extension with Munster in January 2022. Upon the completion of his contract Coombes departed the Munster team in 2025.

== Ireland ==
Coombes was called up to the Ireland Under-20 squad for the 2017 World Rugby Under 20 Championship after an injury suffered by fellow Munster colleague Colm Hogan, and he went on to start against New Zealand Under-20.

== Honours ==
=== Christian Brothers College ===
- Munster Schools Rugby Senior Cup:
  - Winner (1): 2016

=== Munster ===
- United Rugby Championship
  - Winner (1): 2022–23

Winner Munster Senior Cup 2018 with Garryowen FC Winner of Bateman Cup 2019 with Garryowen FC
