= Tiff Eden =

English rugby union footballer (born 1994)

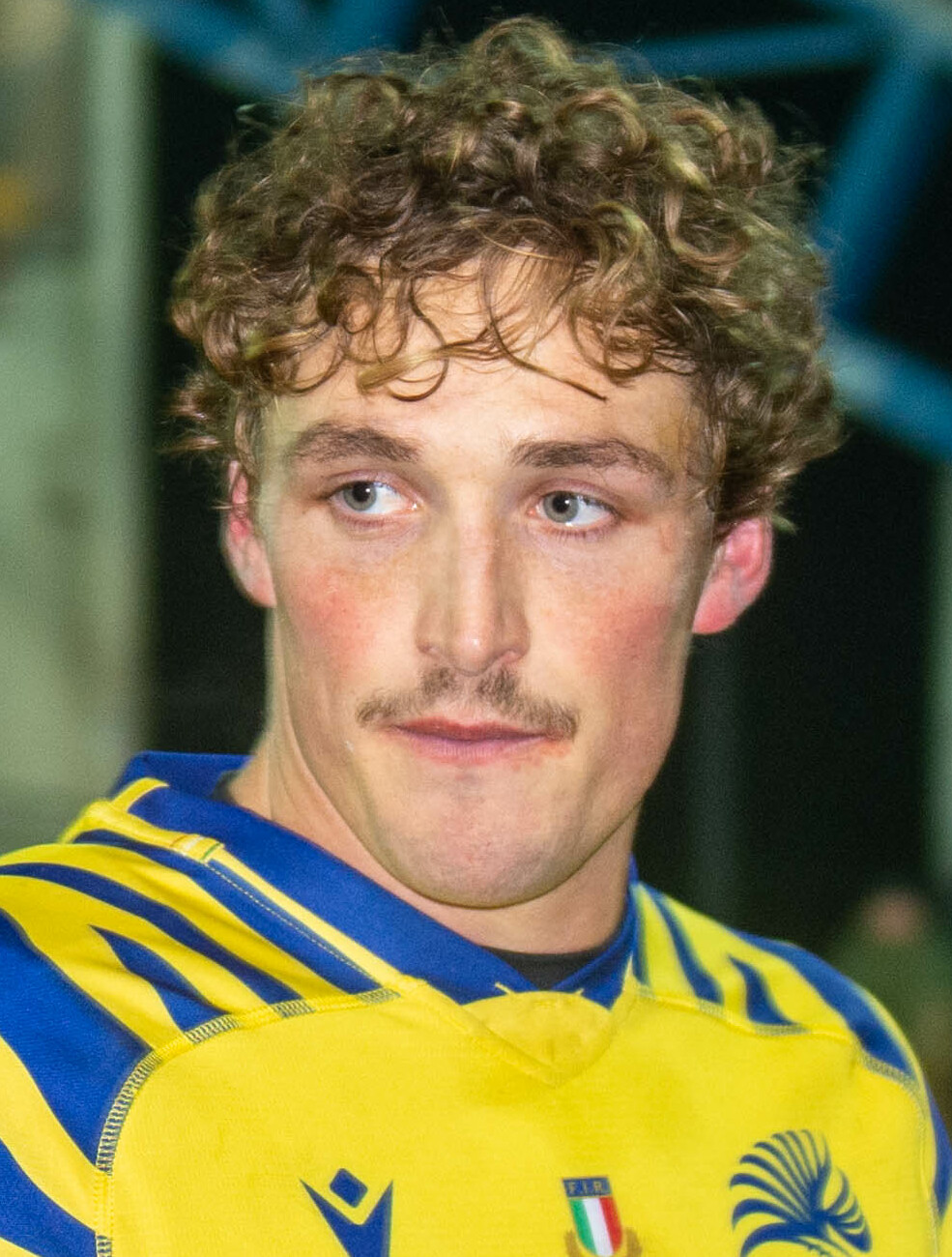
- Born: 16 October 1994 (age 32) Cheltenham, England
- Height: 1.83 m (6 ft 0 in)
- Weight: 92 kg (14.5 st; 203 lb)

Rugby union career
- Position: Fly-half
Senior career
Years	Team	Apps	(Points)
2014–2017	Worcester Warriors	7	(4)
2014–2017	→ Nottingham	12	(74)
2017–2018	Nottingham	24	(211)
2018–2022	Bristol Bears	24	(76)
2019	→ Hartpury University	7	(23)
2022–2024	Zebre Parma	23	(100)
2024–	Saracens		
- Correct as of 15 May 2024

Tiff Eden (born 16 October 1994) is an English rugby union player, currently playing for Worcester Warriors in the Elior Champ Rugby. His preferred position is fly-half.

== Career ==
Eden began his career with the Worcester Warriors, making 7 appearances, will also taking in a loan spell with Nottingham. He joined Nottingham permanently in 2017, spending a season with them, before joining Bristol Bears. After four seasons with Bristol, and a loan spell with Hartpury University, he joined Italian side Zebre Parma ahead of the 2022–23 United Rugby Championship. He played with Zebre Parma until 2023–24 season. Now back playing for Worcester Warriors, playing Championship Rugby.2025.
