= Gavin Coombes =

Irish rugby union player (born 1997)

- Born: 11 December 1997 (age 28) Skibbereen, County Cork, Ireland
- Height: 1.93 m (6 ft 4 in)
- Weight: 110 kg (17 st; 240 lb)
- School: Bandon Grammar School
- Notable relative: Liam Coombes (cousin) Gary O'Donovan(cousin) Paul O'Donovan (cousin)

Rugby union career
- Position(s): Number 8, Flanker, Lock
Amateur team(s)
Years	Team	Apps	(Points)
- Bandon
2016–	Young Munster		
Senior career
Years	Team	Apps	(Points)
2018–	Munster	146	(275)
- Correct as of 31 October 2026
International career
Years	Team	Apps	(Points)
2017	Ireland U20	9	(5)
2021–	Ireland	3	(5)
2022	Ireland A	1	(0)
- Correct as of 5 July 2025

Gavin Coombes (born 11 December 1997) is an Irish rugby union player who plays as a number eight for United Rugby Championship club Munster and the Ireland national team.

== Early life ==
Born in Skibbereen, County Cork, Coombes first began playing rugby for Skibbereen RFC. He attended Bandon Grammar School and captained the senior rugby team to the quarter-finals of the 2016 Munster Schools Rugby Senior Cup. Coombes went on to represent Munster at under-18 and under-19 levels, winning inter-provincial championships with both, as well as also representing Ireland at under-18 and under-19 levels.

== Munster ==
Coombes was part of the Munster A team that won the 2016–17 British and Irish Cup, starting at blindside flanker in the 29–28 victory against Jersey Reds in the final on 21 April 2017.

Coombes started at number 8 in both of Munster's pre-season friendlies in August 2018, before being named in his first Pro14 squad. He made his competitive debut for Munster on 1 September 2018, coming off the bench in their opening 2018–19 Pro14 fixture against Cheetahs in Thomond Park, a game which Munster won 38–0. Coombes signed a two-year contract with Munster in October 2018, a deal that saw him join the senior team from the 2019–20 season.

Coombes scored his first tries for Munster in their 29–10 win against Welsh side Scarlets during round 13 of the 2019–20 Pro14 on 29 February 2020. Coombes scored a hat-trick of tries and won the Man-of-the-Match award in Munster's 38–22 win against Ospreys in round 6 of the 2020–21 Pro14 on 15 November 2020. He made his Champions Cup debut for the province in their opening fixture of the 2020–21 competition against English side Harlequins on 13 December 2020, scoring a try in Munster's 21–7 home win.

Coombes signed a two-year contract extension with Munster in March 2021. He started for Munster in their 16–6 defeat against Leinster in the 2021 Pro14 Grand Final on 27 March 2021, and was the standout performer for the province on an otherwise disappointing occasion. One week later, Coombes scored two tries in Munster's 40–33 home defeat against Toulouse in the last 16 of the 2020–21 Champions Cup, in another strong individual performance for the province.

Coombes scored four tries in Munster's 54–11 away win against Italian side Zebre in round 6 of the Pro14 Rainbow Cup on 11 June 2021, which saw Coombes finish with 15 tries in his 22 appearances for Munster during the 2020–21 season, and equal the Munster record for tries scored in a game (tied with Mike Mullins (2001) and Alex Wootton (2017)). In total, Coombes racked up 1,310 minutes for Munster during the season, and averaged a try every 87 minutes. In recognition of his performances throughout the 2020–21 season, Coombes won the Munster Player of the Year award, becoming the youngest ever winner of the accolade.

Coombes picked up where he left off at the start of the 2021–22 season, scoring two tries in Munster's 42–17 win against South African side the Sharks in their opening 2021–22 United Rugby Championship fixture on 25 September 2021. He won Men's Young Player of the Year at the 2021 Rugby Players Ireland Awards. Coombes scored the winning try in the 77th minute of Munster's 16–13 away win against French club Castres in round 3 of the 2021–22 Champions Cup on 14 January 2022. He signed a two-year contract extension with Munster in March 2022, a deal that will see him remain with the province until at least 2025, and earned his 50th cap for the province in their 34–19 defeat at home against Leinster on 2 April 2022, though Coombes had to leave the field with an ankle injury during the first-half. That injury required surgery, and Coombes made his return for the province when he started in their 36–17 away defeat against Ulster in the quarter-final of the 2021–22 URC on 3 June 2022.

Coombes started in Munster's historic 28–14 win against a South Africa XV in Páirc Uí Chaoimh on 10 November 2022. He scored a hat-trick of tries and earned the player of the match award in Munster's 58–3 home win against Welsh side Ospreys in round 14 of the 2022–23 United Rugby Championship on 17 February 2023. For his performances during the 2022–23 season, Coombes was selected in the United Rugby Championship's Elite XV. He started in Munster's 19–14 win against the Stormers in the final of the 2022–23 United Rugby Championship on 27 May 2023.

== Ireland ==
Coombes represented Ireland U20s during the 2017 Six Nations Under 20s Championship and 2017 World Rugby Under 20 Championship. After Caelan Doris was ruled out of Ireland's opening 2021 Six Nations away to Wales due to injury, Coombes received his first senior international call up to the Ireland squad as Doris' replacement. Coombes made his senior competitive debut for Ireland as a replacement in their mid-year test against Japan on 3 July 2021, coming on for provincial teammate Peter O'Mahony in the 70th minute of Ireland's 39–31 win, and he made his first start for Ireland one week later in their test against the United States, also scoring his first try for Ireland in their 71–10 win.

Coombes was selected in the squad for the 2022 Ireland rugby union tour of New Zealand, and started in the uncapped match against the Māori All Blacks on 29 June, scoring a try in Ireland's 32–17 defeat, before also starting in the second uncapped match against the Māori All Blacks on 12 July, scoring a try in Ireland's 30–24 win. Coombes started in Ireland A's 47–19 defeat against an All Blacks XV on 4 November 2022. He was selected in Ireland's 42-man training squad for the 2023 Rugby World Cup warm-up matches, but was released without making a match appearance.

In February 2025, with Ireland captain Caelan Doris a doubt for the upcoming fixture against Wales Coombes was called into the senior training squad mid-way through the 2025 Six Nations.

== Statistics ==
=== International analysis by opposition ===
Against	Played	Won	Lost	Drawn	Tries	Points	% Won
Japan	1	1	0	0	0	0	100
United States	1	1	0	0	1	5	100
Total	2	2	0	0	1	5	100

Correct as of 10 July 2021

== Honours ==
=== Munster A ===
- British and Irish Cup:
  - Winner (1): 2016–17

=== Munster ===
- United Rugby Championship
  - Winner (1): 2022–23

=== Individual ===
- Munster Player of the Year:
  - Winner (1): 2020–21
- Rugby Players Ireland Men's Young Player of the Year:
  - Winner (1): 2021
- United Rugby Championship Elite XV:
  - Selected (1): 2022–23
