= Shane Daly =

Irish rugby union player (born 1996)

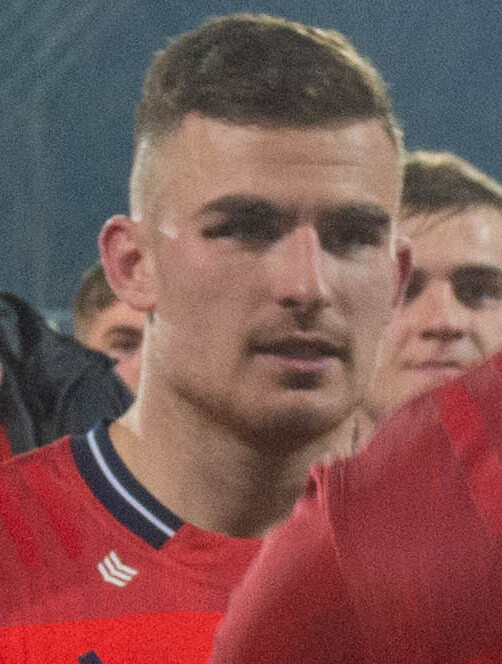
- Daly in 2022
- Born: 19 December 1996 (age 29) Cork, Ireland
- Height: 1.91 m (6 ft 3 in)
- Weight: 92 kg (14.5 st; 203 lb)
- School: Presentation Brothers College

Rugby union career
- Position(s): Centre, Fullback, Wing
Amateur team(s)
Years	Team	Apps	(Points)
- Highfield
2015–	Cork Constitution		
Senior career
Years	Team	Apps	(Points)
2018–	Munster	127	(140)
- Correct as of 24 October 2026
International career
Years	Team	Apps	(Points)
2016	Ireland U20	10	(20)
2017–2019	Ireland 7s		
2020–	Ireland	2	(0)
2022	Emerging Ireland	3	(10)
2022	Ireland A	4	(0)
- Correct as of 06 February 2026

Shane Daly (born 19 December 1996) is an Irish rugby union player who plays as a wing, fullback or midfield for United Rugby Championship club Munster. He is an Ambassador for the Irish Heart Foundation.

== Early life ==
Born in Cork, Daly first began playing soccer for College Corinthians FC winning Cork League and Cup each year from Under-9s up to and including Under-16s before switching to rugby. He played a small amount of rugby with Highfield R.F.C. underage but began to commit to rugby in his fifth year in Presentation Brothers College, Cork, where he played in the Munster Schools Rugby Senior Cup. He was selected for the Munster Under-19s and Munster Under-20s. He won the 2016 Under20s inter-provincial title with Munster.

== Cork Constitution ==
On leaving School, Daly was encouraged to join a Division 1 side in the All-Ireland League Division. He joined Cork Con and won the 2016 All-Ireland U20 title. He was part of the Con team that won the All-Ireland League Division 1A, Munster Senior Cup and All-Ireland Cup during the 2016–17 season, as well as winning a second Senior Cup and All-Ireland League during the 2018–19 season. Con defended their Munster Senior Cup title during the 2019–20 season, defeating Young Munster 24–17 in the final, though Daly missed the match as he was with the senior Munster team for their inter-provincial clash against Connacht.

== Munster ==
Daly made his debut for Munster A in their 2017–18 British and Irish Cup win against Ospreys Premiership Select on 14 October 2017, with Daly starting on the left-wing in the 24–6 victory.

Daly was named in his first senior Munster match squad in April 2018, being selected on the bench for the provinces' 2017–18 Pro14 fixture against Ulster, though Daly was not used as a replacement during the 24–24 draw. Daly finally made his competitive debut for Munster on 1 September 2018, starting in the provinces' opening 2018–19 Pro14 fixture against Cheetahs in Thomond Park, a game which Munster won 38–0.

Daly signed a two-year contract with Munster in October 2018, a deal that saw Daly join the senior team from the 2019–20 season, and scored his first try for the province in their 37–28 away win against Italian side Benetton on 12 April 2019. In Munster's opening fixture of the 2019–20 Pro14 against Welsh side Dragons on 28 September 2019, Daly scored a try and earned the Man-of-the-Match award in the provinces 39–9 win. He made his European debut for the province in their 39–22 defeat away to French club, Racing 92, in round 5 of the 2019–20 Champions Cup on 12 January 2020. Daly's performances were rewarded with a nomination for the Nevin Spence Young Player of the Year award at the 2020 Irish Rugby player awards in October 2020, and he won Munster's Young Player of the Year award for the 2019–20 season.

Daly signed a two-year contract extension with the province in February 2021, and extended that contract by a further two years in September 2022 and a further two years in September 2024.

He started and scored a try in Munster's historic 28–14 win against a South Africa XV in Páirc Uí Chaoimh on the 10 November 2022 and is recorded as the first rugby player to score in these grounds as it hosted its first rugby match. The try was later nominated for Men's Try of the Year at the 2023 Rugby Players Ireland awards. Daly started in Munster's win against South Africa side, the Stormer's, in the 2022-23 United Rugby Championship Grand Final, held in Cape town on 27 May 2023, winning Munster's first silverware since 2011. Daly won the URC Ironman for the most minutes played by any player in the 2023–24 season. He earned his 100th cap for Munster when he started and scored a try in their 33–7 home win against French side, Stade Francais, in Round 1 of the 2024-25 Investec Champions Cup on 7 December 2024.

== Ireland ==
Daly represented Ireland under-20s during the 2016 Six Nations Under-20s Championship and 2016 World Rugby Under 20 Championship, starting every game and scoring two tries in the former, and scoring a try in the final of the World Cup as Ireland U-20 finished the tournament as runners-up, their best ever result. The 2016 team were the first Irish men's team to beat an All Blacks team when they sensationally beat the defending world champions 33–24 in Pool A of the 2016 U20 World Cup.

Daly has also represented Ireland 7s, where he played as a forward. He was selected in the squad for the 2017–18 season. He was a member of the Ireland squad that finished seventh at the 2018 Paris Sevens. He was also part of the squad that finished in ninth place and won the Challenge Trophy at the 2018 Rugby World Cup Sevens in San Francisco, beating Australia 24–14 in the final. He was included in the squads for the 2019 Paris Sevens and the 2019 Rugby Europe Sevens Olympic Qualifying Tournament.

Daly's form for Munster during the 2019–20 season was rewarded with his first senior call-up in October 2020 to the Ireland squad for the two delayed remaining fixtures of the 2020 Six Nations Championship. He made his debut for Ireland in their final Autumn Nations Cup pool fixture against Georgia on 29 November 2020, coming on as a replacement for provincial teammate Keith Earls in Ireland's 23–10 win. Daly also came on as a substitute in Ireland v Japan on 3 July 2021 where Ireland won 39–31.

Daly was selected in the Emerging Ireland squad that travelled to South Africa to participate in the Toyota Challenge against Currie Cup teams Free State Cheetahs, Griquas and Pumas in September–October 2022. He started and scored one try in Emerging Ireland's 54–7 opening win against Griquas on 30 September, featured as a replacement in the 28–24 win against the Pumas on 5 October, and started and scored one try again in the 21–14 win against the Cheetahs on 9 October.

Following the Toyota Challenge, Daly was also selected in the Ireland A panel that joined the senior Ireland team after round 7 of the 2022–23 United Rugby Championship to face an All Blacks XV on 4 November 2022; Daly featured as a replacement in Ireland A's 47–19 defeat.

Daly was selected again for Ireland A's for a fixture against England A's held in Bristol on 23 February 2025. This was the first Ireland ‘A’ fixture since November 2022's clash with the All Blacks XV. During this fixture Daly sustained a torn hamstring injury that ruled him out of contention for Irelands 2025 summer tour.

== Statistics ==
=== International analysis by opposition ===
Against	Played	Won	Lost	Drawn	Tries	Points	% Won
Georgia	1	1	0	0	0	0	100
Japan	1	1	0	0	0	0	100
Total	2	2	0	0	0	0	100

Correct as of 3 July 2021

== Honours ==
=== Cork Constitution ===
- All-Ireland League Division 1A:
  - Winner (2): 2016–17, 2018–19
- All-Ireland Cup:
  - Winner (1): 2016–17
- Munster Senior Cup:
  - Winner (3): 2016–17, 2018–19, 2019–20

=== Munster ===
- United Rugby Championship
  - Winner (1): 2022–23

=== Individual ===
- Munster Young Player of the Year:
  - Winner (1): 2019–20
- URC Ironman 2023-24
- 100 Munster Caps December 2024
