= Joaquin Riera =

Argentine rugby player

Joaquin Andres Riera
- Born: 22 February 1994 (age 32) San Miguel de Tucuman, Argentina
- Height: 1.82 m (6 ft 0 in)
- Weight: 87 kg (13 st 10 lb; 192 lb)

Rugby union career
- Position: Centre
- Current team: Rouen Normandie
Youth career
- Los Tarcos
Amateur team(s)
Years	Team	Apps	(Points)
2017	Tucumán		
Senior career
Years	Team	Apps	(Points)
2014−2015	L'Aquila	9	(29)
2016−2017	Los Tarcos	2	(0)
2017−2020	Petrarca Padova	41	(84)
2019−2020	→Benetton	5	(5)
2020−2024	Benetton	41	(15)
2024−	Rouen Normandie		
- Correct as of 1 Oct 2022
International career
Years	Team	Apps	(Points)
2014	Argentina Under 20	2	(0)
- Correct as of 20 May 2020
National sevens team
Years	Team		Comps
2015−2017	Argentina		11
- Correct as of 19 November 2022

Joaquin Andres Riera (born 22 February 1994) is an Argentine rugby union player. His usual position is as a Centre and he currently plays for Rouen Normandie in French Championnat Fédéral Nationale.

Under contract with Petrarca Padova, for 2019–20 Pro14 season, he named like Permit Player for Benetton in Pro 14. He played for Benetton Rugby from summer 2020 to 2023–24 United Rugby Championship season.

After playing for Argentina Under 20 in 2014, from 2015 to 2017 Riera was named in the Argentina Sevens for World Rugby Sevens Series.
