= Huw Sutton =

Welsh rugby union player

- Born: Huw Owen-Sutton; 17 November 1999 (age 26) Wales
- Height: 199 cm (6 ft 6 in)
- Weight: 122 kg (19 st 3 lb; 269 lb)

Rugby union career
- Position: Lock
Senior career
Years	Team	Apps	(Points)
2022–	Ospreys	2	(0)
- Correct as of 23 January 2022

Huw Sutton (born 17 November 1999) is a Welsh rugby union player, currently playing for United Rugby Championship side Ospreys. His preferred position is lock.

== Ospreys ==
Sutton was named in Ospreys squad for the Round 4 match of the 2021–22 European Rugby Champions Cup against Sale Sharks. He made his debut in the same fixture, coming on as a replacement.

Sutton signed an extension with the Ospreys on 21 February 2024.
