= Rhys Henry =

Welsh rugby union player

- Born: 8 September 1998 (age 28) Wales
- Height: 1.78 m (5 ft 10 in)
- Weight: 114 kg (18.0 st; 251 lb)

Rugby union career
- Position: Prop
Senior career
Years	Team	Apps	(Points)
2021–	Ospreys	23	(5)
- Correct as of 25 October 2023
International career
Years	Team	Apps	(Points)
2018	Wales U20	9	(0)
- Correct as of 25 October 2023

Rhys Henry (born 8 September 1998) is a Welsh rugby union player, currently playing for Pro14 side Ospreys. His preferred position is prop.

== Ospreys ==
Henry was named in the squad for Round 15 of the 2020–21 Pro14 in the match against Glasgow Warriors. He made his debut in the same match as a replacement.
