= Charlie Savala =

Australian rugby union player (born 2000)

- Born: Charlie Savala; 21 April 2000 (age 26) Sydney, Australia
- Height: 1.93 m (6 ft 4 in)
- Weight: 96 kg (15 st 2 lb)
- Notable relative: Hugo Savala (brother)

Rugby union career
- Position(s): Fly-half, Centre
Senior career
Years	Team	Apps	(Points)
2021–23	Edinburgh Rugby	33	(40)
2023–25	Northampton Saints	17	(23)
2025–	Glasgow Warriors		

Charlie Savala (born 21 April 2000) is an Australian rugby union player who currently plays for Glasgow Warriors. He previously played for Edinburgh Rugby and Northampton Saints.

== Rugby Union career ==
=== Professional career ===
He joined Edinburgh Rugby in October 2020. He made his debut in Round 16 of the 2020–21 Pro14 season against Cardiff Blues.

On 10 November 2023, Savala was originally signed on a season-long loan deal to join English side Northampton Saints in the Premiership Rugby competition. However, it became a permanent deal for Savala to remain with Northampton from the 2024–25 season.

On 10 May 2025 it was announced that he had signed for Glasgow Warriors for the 2025–26 season. Savala stated of the move:

Glasgow have always been a team that like to attack, no matter when the opportunity arises, and that's a philosophy that really excites me and aligns with how I like to play the game. I pride myself on being able to fill whatever role the team requires of me and I want to do my bit to help this team succeed.

I’ve had a few run-outs at Scotstoun with Edinburgh and Northampton, so I know how much of a fortress the boys have made it – I can't wait to run out with the Warrior Nation on my side this time!

=== International career ===
In March 2023, Savala was called up to the Scotland international squad for the final round of the Six Nations Championship.

== Rugby League career ==
Savala originally played Rugby league, playing for the academy of the Sydney Roosters side.
