= Carrick McDonough =

Welsh rugby union player

- Born: Carrick McDonough; 25 June 2002 (age 24) Wales

Rugby union career
- Position: Wing
- Current team: Pontypool RFC
Senior career
Years	Team	Apps	(Points)
2021-2021	Dragons	0	(0)
2025-	Pontypool RFC	0	(0)
- Correct as of 10 April 2022
International career
Years	Team	Apps	(Points)
2021	Wales U20	4	(5)
- Correct as of 10 April 2022
National sevens team
Years	Team		Comps
2022–	Wales Sevens		1
- Correct as of 10 April 2022

Carrick McDonough (born 25 June 2002) is a Welsh rugby union player for Pontypool RFC in the Super Rygbi Cymru. McDonough's primarily plays on the wing.

== Rugby Union career ==
=== Professional career ===
McDonough was named in the Dragons academy squad for the 2021–22 season. He is yet to debut for the Dragons, but has represented Wales Sevens at one tournament, in 2022.
