= Liam Turner =

Irish rugby union player (born 1999)

- Born: 14 July 1999 (age 27) Dublin, Republic of Ireland
- Height: 1.73 m (5 ft 8 in)
- Weight: 91 kg (14.3 st; 201 lb)
- School: Blackrock College
- University: Trinity College, Dublin

Rugby union career
- Position(s): Wing, Centre (15s); Forward (7s)
Amateur team(s)
Years	Team	Apps	(Points)
- Dublin University
Senior career
Years	Team	Apps	(Points)
2019–2025	Leinster	25	(20)
2025 -	Nevers		
- Correct as of 1 March 2025
International career
Years	Team	Apps	(Points)
2019	Ireland U20	5	(5)
2020–	Ireland Sevens	10	(0)
- Correct as of 2 January 2021

Liam Turner (born 22 July 1999) is an Irish rugby union player, currently playing for USON Nevers in France. Prior to June 2025 he played for Leinster. A former captain of the winning Blackrock Senior Cup Team, his preferred position is wing. Turner made his debut for Leinster in October 2020.

== National team ==
Turner represented the Ireland national rugby sevens team on the World Rugby Sevens Series, where he played as a forward. He debuted for the national sevens team in 2020.
