= Rob Russell =

Irish rugby union player

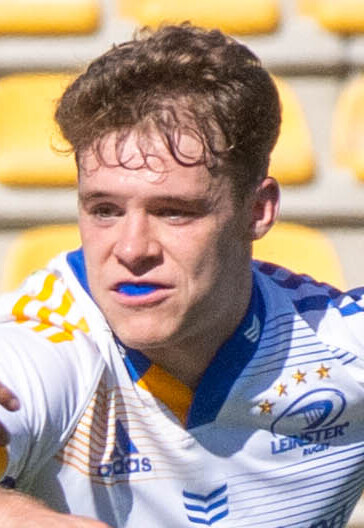
- Born: 13 January 1999 (age 27) Dublin, Ireland
- Height: 1.83 m (6 ft 0 in)
- Weight: 90 kg (200 lb; 14 st 2 lb)
- School: St. Michael's College

Rugby union career
- Position: Wing / Fullback
Senior career
Years	Team	Apps	(Points)
2021–2025	Leinster	34	(90)
2025–2026	Gloucester	5	(0)
2026–	Munster	1	(0)
- Correct as of 31 October 2026
International career
Years	Team	Apps	(Points)
2019	Ireland U20s	8	(5)
- Correct as of 3 October 2021

Rob Russell (born 13 January 1999) is an Irish rugby union player for United Rugby Championship and European Rugby Champions Cup side Munster. His preferred position is wing or fullback. He previously played for Leinster and Gloucester.

== Career ==
Russell was named in the Leinster Rugby academy for the 2021–22 season. He made his debut in Round 2 of the 2021–22 United Rugby Championship against the Dragons. Leinster Rugby announced Russell's first senior contract with the club on 20 April 2023

In May 2025, it was announced that Russell would be leaving Leinster at the end of the 2024–25 season. In June 2025, it was announced that he would be joining Gloucester in the English Premiership from the start of the 2025–26 season. He left Gloucester at the end of that season. He signed for Munster as short term injury cover in October 2026, following impressive form with Old Belvedere R.F.C. in the All-Ireland League.
