= Ethan Lloyd =

Welsh rugby union player

- Born: 29 September 2001 (age 25) Wales
- Height: 1.78 m (5 ft 10 in)
- Weight: 81 kg (179 lb; 12 st 11 lb)

Rugby union career
- Position: Scrum-half
Senior career
Years	Team	Apps	(Points)
2021–	Cardiff	3	(0)
- Correct as of 11 December 2021
International career
Years	Team	Apps	(Points)
2021	Wales U20	5	(0)
- Correct as of 11 December 2021

Ethan Lloyd (born 29 September 2001) is a Welsh rugby union player, currently playing for United Rugby Championship side Cardiff. His preferred position is scrum-half.

== Cardiff ==
Lloyd was named in the Cardiff academy squad for the 2021–22 season. He made his debut for Cardiff in the first round of the 2021–22 European Rugby Champions Cup against Toulouse coming on as a replacement.
