= Tiaan Thomas-Wheeler =

Welsh rugby union player

- Full name: Tiaan Thomas-Wheeler
- Born: 19 November 1999 (age 26) Neath, Wales
- Height: 193 cm (6 ft 4 in)
- Weight: 102 kg (225 lb)

Rugby union career
- Position: Centre / Fullback
- Current team: Shokki Shuttles
Senior career
Years	Team	Apps	(Points)
2017–2023	Ospreys	57	(25)
2023–Current	Toyota Industries Shuttles Aichi	22	(15)
International career
Years	Team	Apps	(Points)
2017 - 2019	Wales U20		

Tiaan Thomas-Wheeler (born 19 November 1999) is a Professional Rugby union player who currently plays for Toyota Industries Shuttles Aichi a Japanese rugby union club, based in Nagoya as a centre / fullback.

Thomas-Wheeler made his senior debut for the Ospreys regional team in 2018 against Gloucester in the Anglo Welsh Cup at the age of 18, having previously played for the Ospreys academy and Neath RFC. He played at the Ospreys between 2018 - 2023 making 57 first team appearances in the European Rugby Challenge Cup, Guinness Pro 14, URC & Heineken Cup. He represented Wales U16's, U18's & U20's. In 2018 at the age of 17 he played for Wales in the 2018 World Rugby Under 20 Championship in France. He also represented Wales in the 2019 World Rugby Under 20 Championship in Argentina where he scored the vital try in Wales's win over New Zealand .
