= Theo Bevacqua =

Welsh rugby union player

- Born: 13 September 2001 (age 25) Wales
- Height: 193 cm (6 ft 4 in)
- Weight: 111 kg (245 lb; 17 st 7 lb)

Rugby union career
- Position: Prop
Senior career
Years	Team	Apps	(Points)
2021–2022	Cardiff Rugby	1	(0)
- Correct as of 08 June 2022
International career
Years	Team	Apps	(Points)
2020–2022	Wales U20s	9	(0)
- Correct as of 27 February 2021

Theo Bevacqua (born 13 September 2001) is a Welsh rugby union player, currently playing for Champ Rugby side Richmond F.C.. His preferred position is prop.

== Professional career ==
Bevacqua signed for the Cardiff academy for the 2020–21 season. He made his Cardiff debut in Round 13 of the 2020–21 Pro14 against Munster. Bevacqua was released at the end of the 2022–23 season.

In 2023, he was named as captain for Cardiff University in the BUCS Super Rugby league. Bevacqua joined Richmond F.C. in 2024.
