= Max O'Reilly =

Irish rugby union player

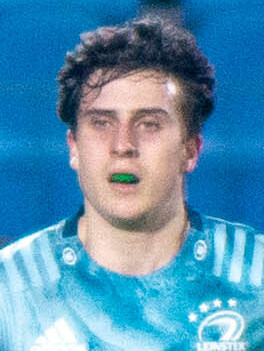
- O'Reilly in 2021
- Born: 26 February 2000 (age 26) Enniskerry, Wicklow, Ireland
- Height: 180 cm (5 ft 11 in)
- Weight: 85 kg (187 lb; 13 st 5 lb)
- School: St Gerard's School

Rugby union career
- Position: Centre
Senior career
Years	Team	Apps	(Points)
2020–	Leinster	11	(10)
- Correct as of 28 January 2023
International career
Years	Team	Apps	(Points)
2019–2020	Ireland U20	3	(5)
2019–	Ireland Sevens	1	(20)
- Correct as of 2 January 2021

Max O'Reilly (born 26 February 2000) is an Irish rugby union player, currently playing for Pro14 and European Rugby Champions Cup side Leinster's academy. His preferred position is centre. O'Reilly made his debut for Leinster during a 24–35 home defeat to Connacht on 2 January 2021.

== National team ==
O'Reilly has represented the Ireland national rugby sevens team on the World Rugby Sevens Series. He debuted for the national sevens team in the 2019 European Grand Prix Sevens.
