= Tim Corkery =

Irish rugby union player (born 2001)

- Born: 1 December 2001 (age 24) Republic of Ireland
- Height: 1.78 m (5 ft 10 in)
- Weight: 80 kg (180 lb; 12 st 8 lb)

Rugby union career
- Position: Fly-half
Senior career
| Years | Team | Apps | (Points) |
| 2021– | Leinster | 2 | (0) |
- Correct as of 28 March 2021
International career
| Years | Team | Apps | (Points) |
| 2020– | Ireland U20s | 3 | (2) |
- Correct as of 12 March 2021

Tim Corkery (born 1 December 2001) is an Irish rugby union player, currently playing for Pro14 and European Rugby Champions Cup side Leinster. His preferred position is fly-half.

== Leinster ==
Corkery was named in the Leinster side for Round 15 of the 2020–21 Pro14 against Zebre. He made his debut in the same match, coming on as a replacement.
