= Chris Cosgrave =

Irish rugby union player

- Born: 24 July 2001 (age 25)
- Height: 1.83 m (6 ft 0 in)
- Weight: 85 kg (187 lb; 13 st 5 lb)
- School: St Michael's

Rugby union career
- Position: Fullback
Senior career
Years	Team	Apps	(Points)
2021–2025	Leinster	7	(10)
2025	Urayasu D-Rocks	3	(5)
- Correct as of 22 April 2023
International career
Years	Team	Apps	(Points)
2021–	Ireland U20	4	(5)
2021–	Ireland Sevens	2	(0)
- Correct as of 28 November 2021

Chris Cosgrave (born 24 July 2001) is an Irish rugby union player, currently playing for United Rugby Championship and European Rugby Champions Cup side Leinster. His preferred position is fullback.

== National team ==
Cosgrave represents the Ireland national rugby sevens team on the World Rugby Sevens Series. He debuted for the national sevens team in 2021.
