= Ben Blain =

- Born: Ben Blain Nickname = the shrub 16 September 1988 (age 38) Carlisle, England
- University: Northumbria University
- Occupation: Rugby union referee

Rugby union career
- Position: Scrum-half
Amateur team(s)
Years	Team	Apps	(Points)
–	Carlisle RFC		
Refereeing career
Years	Competition		Apps
2015	National League 1		
2016–	Scottish Premiership		
2017–	European Challenge Cup		
2018–	Pro14		
2019–	Rugby Europe International Championships		
2019–	Super 6		

Ben Blain (born 16 September 1988) is a professional rugby union referee who represents the Scottish Rugby Union.

== Rugby union career ==
=== Playing career ===
==== Amateur career ====
Blain played with Carlisle RFC as a scrum-half.

=== Referee career ===
==== Professional career ====
Blain began refereeing with Cumbria Referee Society. By 2015 he was refereeing local English matches in National League 1. and Academy matches for the English Premiership.

In 2016, Blain joined the Scottish Rugby Union to be part of their referee group. He is now a member of the Borders Referee Society. He was promoted to the Elite SRU refereeing panel in 2017.

He now referees in the Scottish Premiership.

He has now refereed in the Pro14. He made his debut in the Dragons v Munster match in January 2019.

He has also refereed in the European Challenge Cup.

Blain refereed his first Super 6 match on 14 December 2019 when the Ayrshire Bulls played Stirling County.

He refereed his first 1872 Cup match on 21 December 2019.

==== International career ====
Blain refereed the Belgium v Georgia in March 2019.

Blain has been picked as Assistant Referee for International matches.

He has also refereed in U20 Six Nations matches.

== Outside of rugby ==
Blain is a chartered surveyor and has a degree in Estate Management from Northumbria University.
