= 2024–25 Ospreys season =

Ospreys
- Union: (Wales) Welsh Rugby Union
- Founded: 2003; 23 years ago
- Location: Swansea, Wales
- Ground: Swansea.com Stadium (Capacity: 20,827)
- CEO: Lance Bradley
- Coach: Mark Jones
- Captain: Jac Morgan
- League: United Rugby Championship
- 2023–24: Quarter-finals; 8th overall (Welsh Shield: 1st)
1st kit	2nd kit

Official website
- www.ospreysrugby.com

The 2024–25 season was Ospreys' fourth season in the United Rugby Championship, and their 22nd season of professional rugby. Along with competing in the URC and its Welsh Shield competition, the club participated in the 2024-25 European Rugby Challenge Cup.

The Ospreys drew an average home attendance of 6,736 in the 2024-25 URC season.

== Senior squad ==
Ospreys United Rugby Championship squad (Note: Taking into account signings and departures head of 2024–25 season as listed on List of 2024–25 United Rugby Championship transfers.)
**Props**: (South Africa) Tom Botha; (Wales) Rhys Henry; (Wales) Cameron Jones; (Wales) Garyn Phillips; (Wales) **Gareth Thomas**; (Wales) Steffan Thomas; (Wales) Ben Warren; **Hookers**: (Wales) **Dewi Lake**; (Wales) Ethan Lewis; (Wales) Lewis Lloyd; (Wales) **Sam Parry**; **Locks**: (Wales) **Adam Beard**; (Wales) **Rhys Davies**; (Wales) James Fender; (England) William Greatbanks^{*}; (Wales) Lewis Jones; (England) Will Spencer; (Wales) Huw Sutton	**Back row**: (Wales) Tristan Davies; (Wales) Harri Deaves; (Wales) Will Griffiths; (Wales) **Jac Morgan** (c); (Wales) Morgan Morris; (Wales) Morgan Morse; (Wales) **James Ratti**; (Wales) **Justin Tipuric**; **Scrum-halves**: (Wales) Luke Davies; (Wales) **Kieran Hardy**; (Wales) Reuben Morgan-Williams; **Fly-halves**: (Wales) **Dan Edwards**; (Wales) Luke Scully; (Australia) Jack Walsh; (Wales) **Owen Williams**	**Centres**: (South Africa) Evardi Boshoff; (England) Phil Cokanasiga; (Wales) Tom Florence; (Wales) **Owen Watkin**; (Wales) **Keiran Williams**; **Wings**: (Wales) Ryan Conbeer ^{ST}; (Wales) Keelan Giles; (Wales) Harri Houston; (South Africa) Daniel Kasende; (Wales) **Luke Morgan**; **Fullbacks**: (Wales) Iestyn Hopkins; (England) Max Nagy^{*}
(c) denotes the team captain, **Bold** denotes internationally capped players.^{*} denotes players qualified to play for Wales on residency or dual nationality.^{ST} denotes players signed on a short-term basis.^{L} denotes a player on loan at the club. Players and their allocated positions from the Ospreys website.

=== Development Squad ===
Ospreys Development squad (Note: Taking into account signings and departures head of 2023–24 season as listed on List of 2023–24 United Rugby Championship transfers.)
**Props**: (Wales) Freddie Chapman; (Wales) Kian Hire; (Wales) Math Iorweth-Scott; **Hookers** **Locks**: (Wales) Liam Edwards; (Wales) Rhys Thomas	**Back row**: (Wales) Dan Gemine; **Scrum-halves**: (Wales) Scott Whitlock; **Fly-halves**: (Wales) Owen Erasmus	**Centres** **Wings**: (Wales) Ieuan Cornelius; (Wales) Cori Lewis-Jenkins; (Wales) Connor Moyse; **Fullbacks**: (Wales) Lewis Edwards
(c) denotes the team captain, **Bold** denotes internationally capped players.^{*} denotes players qualified to play for Wales on residency or dual nationality. Players and their allocated positions from the Ospreys website.

== Management & coaching staff ==
Management

Position	Name	Nationality
Owner	James Davies-Yandle	Wales
CEO	Lance Bradley	England
Director	Roger Blyth	Wales
Corporate Brand Director	Vacant	

Coaching

Position	Name	Nationality
Rugby General Manager	Dan Griffiths	Wales
Development Director	Mike Ruddock	Wales
Performance Director	Corin Palmer	England
Development Pathway Manager	Gareth Walters	Wales
Head coach	Mark Jones	Wales
First Team Coach	Duncan Jones	Wales
Skills coach	Richard Fussell	Wales
Academy Skills coach	Andrew Bishop	Wales
Academy Skills coach	James Hook	Wales
Team Logistics Manager	Dai Davies	Wales
Head of Physical Performance	Simon Church	Wales
Lead Strength & Conditioning Coach	Alex Lawson	Wales
Strength & Conditioning Coach	Josh Robinson	Wales
Strength & Conditioning Coach	Liam Thomas	Wales
Medical Performance Manager	Chris Towers	Wales
Physiotherapist	Matthew Bowen	Wales
Physiotherapist	Gavin Daglish	Wales
Lead Doctor	Simon Davies	Wales
Head Analyst	Aled Griffiths	Wales
Analyst	Dan Hiscocks	Wales
Analyst	Callum Nibblet	Wales
Kit Custodian	Shaun McAuliffe	Wales
Admin Assistant/Travel Coordinator	Lyn Jones	Wales
Sports Psychologist	Steve Mellalieu	Wales
Graduate Sports Therapist	Dan Maru	Wales

== United Rugby Championship ==
Main table

Pos	Team	Pld	W	D	L	PF	PA	PD	TF	TA	TB	LB	Pts	Qualification
1	Leinster (CH)	18	16	0	2	542	256	+286	79	35	11	1	76	Qualifies for home URC quarter-final; Qualification for the 2025–26 Champions Cup
2	Bulls (RU)	18	14	0	4	542	361	+181	71	44	9	3	68	Qualifies for home URC quarter-final; Qualification for the 2025–26 Champions Cup
3	Sharks	18	13	0	5	436	402	+34	55	59	7	3	62	Qualifies for home URC quarter-final; Qualification for the 2025–26 Champions Cup
4	Glasgow Warriors	18	11	0	7	468	327	+141	70	40	10	5	59	Qualifies for home URC quarter-final; Qualification for the 2025–26 Champions Cup
5	Stormers	18	10	0	8	507	418	+89	66	57	11	4	55	Qualifies for URC quarter-final; Qualification for the 2025–26 Champions Cup
6	Munster	18	9	0	9	444	429	+15	67	59	11	4	51	Qualifies for URC quarter-final; Qualification for the 2025–26 Champions Cup
7	Edinburgh	18	8	1	9	471	407	+64	66	57	9	6	49	Qualifies for URC quarter-final; Qualification for the 2025–26 Champions Cup
8	Scarlets	18	9	1	8	427	382	+45	50	52	6	4	48	Qualifies for URC quarter-final; Qualification for the 2025–26 Champions Cup
9	Cardiff	18	8	1	9	409	477	−68	63	65	10	3	47	Qualification for the 2025–26 Challenge Cup
10	Benetton	18	9	1	8	393	478	−85	50	65	7	1	46	Qualification for the 2025–26 Challenge Cup
11	Lions	18	8	0	10	402	440	−38	53	60	5	3	40	Qualification for the 2025–26 Challenge Cup
12	Ospreys	18	7	1	10	437	454	−17	60	63	6	4	40	Qualification for the 2025–26 Challenge Cup
13	Connacht	18	6	0	12	420	472	−52	64	62	9	6	39	Qualification for the 2025–26 Challenge Cup
14	Ulster	18	7	0	11	414	506	−92	59	72	5	5	38	Qualification for the 2025–26 Challenge Cup
15	Zebre Parma	18	5	1	12	302	503	−201	38	72	3	4	29	Qualification for the 2025–26 Challenge Cup
16	Dragons	18	1	0	17	335	637	−302	43	92	1	4	9	Qualification for the 2025–26 Challenge Cup

Source: UnitedRugby.com
Rules for classification: Tiebreakers for teams tied on points: 1) Number of matches won 2) The difference between points for and points against 3) The number of tries scored 4) The most points scored 5) The difference between tries for and tries against 6) The fewest red cards received 7) The fewest yellow cards received.

=== Round 1 ===
21 September 2024
15:00

Dragons (Wales)	23–21	(Wales) Ospreys (1 BP)
Try: Keddie 26' c Yendle 83' c Con: L. Evans (2/2) 27', 84'; Pen: L. Evans (3) 1', 23', 77'		Try: K. Williams 19' c Conbeer 45' m Con: Edwards 20' (1/2); Pen: Edwards (3) 7', 33', 37'

Rodney Parade, Newport
Attendance: 5,181
Referee: Ben Breakspear (Wales)

=== Round 2 ===
28 September 2024
19:35

(1 BP) Ospreys (Wales)	37–24	(South Africa) Stormers
Try: J. Morgan 25' c Morgan-Williams48' c Edwards 64' c Penalty try 80'; Con: Edwards (3/3) 26', 49', 65'; Pen: Edwards (2) 8', 36'; Drop: Edwards 52'		Try: Zas 5' c Schickerling 70' m Con: Matthee (1/2) 6'; Pen: Matthee (3/3) 11', 22', 41'; Drop: Willemse 44'

Brewery Field. Bridgend
Attendance: 3,781
Referee: Andrew Brace (Ireland)

=== Round 3 ===
5 October 2024
19:35

(1 BP) Munster (Ireland)	23–0	(Wales) Ospreys
Try: McCarthy 1' m Farrell 26' m Nash 39' m O'Donoghue 63' m Pen: Crowley 9'

Musgrave Park, Cork
Attendance: 8,293
Referee: Mike Adamson (Scotland)

=== Round 4 ===
12 October 2024
19:35

Ospreys (Wales)	19–29	(South Africa) Bulls (1 BP)
Try: Lake 26' m Conbeer 54' c Morris 79' c Con: Edwards (1/2) 55'; Walsh (1/1) 79'		Try: E. Louw 2' c' Arendse (2) 10' m, 22' c Papier 12' c Con: Chamberlain (3/4) 3', 13', 23'; Pen: Chamberlain 76'

Swansea.com Stadium, Swansea
Attendance: 3,901
Referee: Eoghan Cross (Ireland)

=== Round 5 ===
18 October 2024
19:35

(1 BP) Ulster (Ireland)	36–12	(Wales) Ospreys
Try: McCormick (2) 4' m, 50' m Stockdale (2) 9' m, 64' c Penalty try Mar. Rea 31' c Con: Cooney 33'; Doak 65'		Try: Parry 39' c Giles 61' m Con: Edwards 40'

Ravenhill Stadium, Belfast
Attendance: 12,272
Referee: Andrea Piardi, Italy

=== Round 6 ===
26 October 2024
15:00

Ospreys (Wales)	22–13	(Scotland) Edinburgh
Try: Lake 3' c Thomas 52' m Parry 74' c Con: O. Williams (2/3) 5', 75'; Pen: O. Williams 59'		Try: Vellacott 22' c Con: Thompson (1/1) 22'; Pen: Thompson (2) 16', 65'

Brewery Field, Bridgend
Attendance: 3,294
Referee: Griffin Colby, South Africa

=== Round 7 ===
30 November 2024
20:35

Zebre Parma (Italy)	22–17	(Wales) Ospreys (1 BP)
Try: Gesi (2) 6' c, 25' m Trulla 43' c Con: Da Re (2/3) 7', 44'; Pen: Da Re 57'		Try: Kasende 18' c Lloyd 72' m Con: O. Williams (1/2) 19', 73'; Pen: O. Williams 39'

Stadio Sergio Lanfranchi, Parma
Attendance: 2,395
Referee: Ian Kenny (Scotland)

=== Round 8 ===
21 December 2024
17:15

Ospreys (Wales)	23–22	(Wales) Scarlets (1 BP)
Try: Parry 36' m Tipuric 46' c Hopkins 80' m Con: Edwards (1/3) 47'; Pen: Edwards (2) 09', 58'	Report	Try: Mee 41' c Con: Lloyd (1/1) 42'; Pen: Lloyd (4) 15', 18', 26', 32'; Costelow 56'

Swansea.com Stadium, Swansea
Attendance: 6,836

=== Round 9 ===
1 January 2025
15:00

Cardiff (Wales)	13–13	(Wales) Ospreys
Try: Botham 6'; Hughes 53'; Pen: Thomas 70'	Report	Try: Edwards 49'; Con: Edwards 50'; Pen: Edwards (2) 31', 68'

Cardiff Arms Park, Cardiff
Attendance: 12,125

=== Round 10 ===
24 January 2025
19:35

Ospreys (Wales)	43–0	(Italy) Benetton
Try: Walsh (2) 09' c, 62' c Kasende 21' c K. Williams 27' c Morse 75' m Hardy 80' c Con: O. Williams (4/4) 09', 22', 28', 63'; Walsh (1/2) 81'; Pen: O. Williams 15'

Swansea.com Stadium, Swansea
Attendance: 2,832

=== Round 11 ===
14 February 2025
19.35

(1 BP) Ospreys (Wales)	19-22	(Ireland) Leinster
Try: Deaves, 35c Lewis, 47'; Jones, 73'c Con: Williams; Walsh	Report	Try: McGrath, 12; Tector, 38'c Slimani, 64'c Con: Frawley; R Byrne; Pen: Frawley, 16'

Swansea.com Stadium, Swansea
Attendance: 3,500

=== Round 12 ===
1 March 2025
19:35

(2 BP) Glasgow Warriors (Scotland)	31 - 32	(Wales) Ospreys (1 BP)
Try: Mann, 20'c Schickerling, 35', 40'c Cordero, 71'; McBeth, 78'c Con: Weir (3)	Report	Try: Morse, 3'; Hardy, 13', 74'c Perry, 17'; Giles, 37'c Con: Edwards; Walsh; Pen: Walsh, 80+1'

Scotstoun Stadium, Glasgow

=== Round 13 ===
22 March 2025	(1 BP) Ospreys (Wales)	43-40	(Ireland) Connacht (2 BP)	Swansea.com Stadium, Swansea
17:15	Try: Giles, 16'c, 32'c Hardy, 34'c Kasende, 35'c, 56'; Walsh, 43'c Con: Edwards (5/6); Pen: Edwards, 4'	Report	Try: Treacy, 1'c Hurley-Langton, 13'c, 69'; Heffernan, 47'c O'Conor, 48'c Murphy, 67'c Con: Ioane (2/2); JJ Hanrahan (3/4)	Attendance: 3,416

=== Round 14 ===
29 March 2025	(1 BP) Scarlets (Wales)	38 - 22	(Wales) Ospreys	Parc y Scarlets, Llanelli
15:00	Try: Murray, 21'; Fifita, 40'; Roberts, 44'; James, 50'; Plumtree, 61'; Con: Lloyd, 45', 51', 62',	Report:BBC; Report:ESPN	Try: Morris, 1'; Hopkins, 14'; Edwards, 75'; Con: Edwards, 1', 15'; Pen: Edwards, 8'	Attendance: 11,384

=== Round 15 ===
19 April 2025	Ospreys (Wales)	19 - 36	(Wales) Cardiff (1BP)	Principality Stadium, Cardiff
15:00	Try: Williams, 11'; Spencer, 60'; Hardy, 76'; Con: Edwards, 11', 77'		Try: Mann, 15', 35'; Hamer-Webb, 20', 29', 80' penalty try, 79'; Con: Sheedy, 16'; Thomas, 81'	Attendance: 28,328; Referee: Ben Connor

=== Round 16 ===
26 April 2025	(1 BP) Ospreys (Wales)	57 – 24	(Wales) Dragons	Swansea.com Stadium
15:00	Try: Spencer, 25'; Lake, 34'; BWarren, 45'; Giles, 50', 78'; Dan Edwards, 56', 59'; Hardy, 71'; Morgan-Williams, 79'; Con: Dan Edwards, 26', 35', 46', 51', 60'; Walsh, 79'	Report, 2	Try: Rees-Weldon, 23'; R Williams, 55'; Rosser, 65'; Con: O'Brein, 24', 55', 66'; Pen: O'Brien, 18'	Attendance: 4,677

=== Round 17 ===
9 May 2025	(1 BP) Sharks (South Africa)	29–10	(Wales) Ospreys	Kings Park Stadium, Durban
19:00	Try: Jenkins, 10'; Esterhuizen, 33'; Hooker, 51'; Buthelezi, 65'; Con: Masuku 11', 52'; Pen: Fassi, 34'; Masuku, 81'	Report	Try: Parry, 60'; Con: Edwards, 61'; Pen: Edwards, 2'	Attendance: 11,599

=== Round 18 ===
17 May 2025
17:15

Lions (South Africa)	v	(Wales) Ospreys

Ellis Park Stadium, Johannesburg
Attendance: 3,871

Ospreys are eliminated from the Championship.

== URC Welsh Shield ==
2024–25 United Rugby Championship Regional Shield Pools
(Wales) Welsh Shield
	Team	P	W	D	L	PF	PA	PD	TF	TA	TBP	LBP	Pts	Pos overall
1	(Wales) Cardiff (S)	6	4	1	1	147	117	+30	23	14	4	1	23	9
2	(Wales) Scarlets	6	4	0	2	163	126	+37	20	18	3	1	20	7
3	(Wales) Ospreys	6	2	1	3	155	156	–1	21	20	1	1	12	12
4	(Wales) Dragons	6	1	0	5	130	196	–66	15	27	0	1	5	16
If teams are level at any stage, tiebreakers are applied in the following order: 1. number of matches won 2. the difference between points for and points against 3. the number of tries scored 4. the most points scored 5. the difference between tries for and tries against 6. the fewest red cards received 7. the fewest yellow cards received
Green background indicates teams currently leading the regional shield. Upon the conclusion of the regular season, these teams win their respective regional shields. (S) : URC Shield champion

== European Challenge Cup ==
EPCR Challenge Cup Pool 2
Pos	Team	Pld	W	D	L	PF	PA	PD	TF	TA	TB	LB	Pts	Qualification
1	(France) Montpellier (2)	4	4	0	0	131	41	+90	19	6	3	0	19	Home round of 16
2	(Wales) Ospreys (4)	4	3	0	1	111	116	−5	16	17	3	0	15	Home round of 16
3	(France) Pau (7)	4	2	0	2	119	108	+11	10	10	3	1	12	Home round of 16
4	(South Africa) Lions (14)	4	2	0	2	122	103	+19	18	13	2	0	10	Away round of 16
5	(Wales) Dragons	4	1	0	3	61	116	−55	8	15	0	1	5	
6	(England) Newcastle Falcons	4	0	0	4	55	115	−60	8	16	0	0	0	

Source: EPCR
Rules for classification: Tiebreakers for teams tied on points: 1) Number of matches won; 2) Difference between points for and against; 3) Total number of points for; 4) Aggregate number of points scored in matches between tied teams; 5) Number of matches won excluding the first match, then the second and so on until the tie is settled.

Pool matches

8 December 2024
15:15

(1 BP) Ospreys (Wales)	30–14	(South Africa) Lions
Try: Morgan 27' c Giles 44' m Hardy 47' c Edwards 78' m Con: O. Williams (2/4) 28', 48'; Pen: O. Williams (2/2) 21', 35'	Report	Try: Marais 10' c Cronjé 75' c Con: Francis (1/1) 11'; Nohamba (1/1) 76'

Parc y Scarlets, Llanelli (Note: The match between Ospreys and Lions was relocated to Parc y Scarlets, due to structural damages at the Swansea.com Stadium caused by Storm Darragh.)
Attendance: 2,877
Referee: Kevin Bralley (France)

=== Round 2 ===
14 December 2024
14:00

(1 BP) Montpellier (France)	59–15	(Wales) Ospreys
Try: Martins 10' c Duguid 14' c Uelese 29' c Coly 36' m Akrab 42' c Moustin 51' m Cadot 53' c Forletta 62' c Tambwe 66' c Con: Coly (4/5) 11', 15', 30', 44'; Hogg (3/4) 54', 62', 67'	Report	Try: Boshoff 69' m Giles 80+2' c Con: Edwards (1/2) 80+3'; Drop: Edwards (1/1) 33'

GGL Stadium, Montpellier
Attendance: 7,793
Referee: Adam Leal (England)

=== Round 3 ===
11 January 2025
17:30

(1 BP) Ospreys (Wales)	35–15	(England) Newcastle Falcons
Try: Walsh (2) 15' c, 64' c Parry 26' c Kasende 30' c Hardy 67' c Con: Edwards (5/5) 16', 27', 31', 65', 68'	Report	Try: Brown 6' c Pepper 77' m Con: Wilkinson (1/2) 7'; Pen: Wilkinson (1/2) 17'

Swansea.com Stadium, Swansea
Attendance: 3,198
Referee: Kevin Bralley (France)

=== Round 4 ===
18 January 2025
14:00

(2 BP) Pau (France)	28–31	(Wales) Ospreys (1 BP)
Try: Attissogbé 7' c Brau-Boirie 37' c Penalty try 64'; Roudil 68' c Con: Desperes (3/3) 8', 38', 69'	Report	Try: Conbeer 14' c Boshoff 44' c J. Morgan 54' m D. Edwards 73' m L. Davies 75' c Con: D. Edwards (3/5) 15', 45', 76'

Stade du Hameau, Pau
Attendance: 6,974
Referee: Federico Vedovelli (Italy)

=== Knockout stages ===
Round of 16
3	(Scotland) Edinburgh	24
14	(South Africa) Lions	12
6	(France) Bayonne	22
11	(South Africa) Bulls	32
7	(France) Pau	24
10	(England) Bath Rugby	49
2	(France) Montpellier	17
15	(England) Gloucester	24
4	(Wales) Ospreys	36
13	(Wales) Scarlets	14
5	(France) Lyon	34
12	(South Africa) Sharks	21
1	(Ireland) Connacht	35
16	(Wales) Cardiff	20
8	(France) Perpignan	18
9	(France) Racing 92	24

Quarter-finals
3	(Scotland) Edinburgh	34
11	(South Africa) Bulls	28
10	(England) Bath Rugby	61
15	(England) Gloucester	26
4	(Wales) Ospreys	18
5	(France) Lyon	20
1	(Ireland) Connacht	40
9	(France) Racing 92	43

Semi-finals
3	(Scotland) Edinburgh	24
10	(England) Bath Rugby	39
5	(France) Lyon	29
9	(France) Racing 92	15

Final
10	(England) Bath Rugby	37
5	(France) Lyon	12

==== Round of 16 ====
Ospreys qualified as fourth seed, securing home field advantage for the first two rounds. In the round of 16, they drew thirteenth seed, and fellow Welsh side Scarlets.

6 April 2025	Ospreys (Wales) (4)	36–14	(13) (Wales) Scarlets	Swansea.com Stadium, Swansea
17:30	Try: Beard 1' c J. Morgan 4' m R. Davies 28' c Lake 38' c Walsh 52' m Kasende 61' m Con: D. Edwards (3/6) 2', 29', 39'	Report	Try: Murray 10' c James 71' c Con: Lloyd (2/2) 11', 71'	Attendance: 9,057; Referee: Matthew Carley (England)

==== Quarter final ====
Victory over Scarlets, in front of the highest home gate of the season, earned Ospreys a home quarter-final against the French Top 14 side, Lyon Olympique. As quarterfinalists, Ospreys were the last Welsh survivors in Europe in this campaign.

12 April 2025
17:30

Ospreys (Wales) (4)	18–20	(5) (France) Lyon
Try: Morgan, 25'; McGuigan, 70'; Con: Edwards, 26'; Pen: Edwards, 19', 54'	Report	Try: Rattez, 6'; Guillard, 50'; Con: Berdeu, 7', 51'; Pen: Berdeu, 21', 34'

Swansea.com Stadium, Swansea
Attendance: 3,723
Referee: Andrew Brace (Ireland)

Ospreys are eliminated from the competition.

== Home attendance ==
As of 20 April 2025

Domestic League						EPRC Challenge Cup						Overall	
League	Fixtures	Total Attendance	Average Attendance	Highest	Lowest	League	Fixtures	Total Attendance	Average Attendance	Highest	Lowest	Total Attendance	Average Attendance
2024–25 United Rugby Championship	9	60,626	6,736	28,328	2,832	2024–25 European Rugby Challenge Cup	4	18,855	4,714	9,057	2,877	79,481	6,114
