= 2023–24 United Rugby Championship =

International rugby union competition

- Countries: Ireland; Italy; Scotland; South Africa; Wales
- Date: 21 October 2023 – 22 June 2024
- Champions: (Scotland) Glasgow Warriors (2nd title)
- Runners-up: (South Africa) Bulls
- Matches played: 151
- Attendance: 1,671,564 (average 11,070 per match)
- Highest attendance: 50,388; Bulls vs Glasgow Warriors (22 June 2024)
- Lowest attendance: 1,600; Zebre vs Ulster (21 October 2023)
- Top point scorer: (Scotland) Ben Healy (175)
- Top try scorer: (Scotland) Johnny Matthews (14)

Official website
- unitedrugby.com

The 2023–24 United Rugby Championship was the 23rd season of the professional rugby union competition known as the United Rugby Championship, and the third season under that name. It began on 21 October 2023 and ended on 22 June 2024. The reigning and defending champions were Munster, who defeated Stormers in the 2023 final.

Glasgow Warriors claimed the 2023–24 championship, defeating the Bulls in the grand final for their second overall championship.

== Format ==
The season consisted of 21 rounds: 18 rounds of regular season play, followed by three rounds of play-offs.

The winner of each Shield was determined solely from the games played amongst the teams within their regional pool, mirroring the format of the old Interprovincial Championship in Ireland.

There were four regional pools: The Irish Shield pool (featuring the four Irish teams), the Welsh Shield pool (featuring the four Welsh teams), the South African Shield pool (featuring the four South African teams), and the Scottish/Italian Shield pool (featuring the two Italian and two Scottish sides). The pools served two functions; they guaranteed a full slate of derby matches for each team, and they awarded a minor Regional Shield trophy to the top team in each pool, which thereby functioned as a national championship in three of the four pools and a cross-border regional championship in the Scottish–Italian pool. They were no longer used to determine qualification for the European Rugby Champions Cup. Instead, the top eight teams in the league table qualified, subject to preserved places for winners of the three main trophies, the URC, the Champions Cup and the Challenge Cup if they were not already qualified by league position.

The winner of each Shield was determined solely from the games played amongst the teams within their regional pool, mirroring the format of the old Interprovincial Championship in Ireland.

Teams played six matches against their regional pool rivals, three home and three away. The remaining twelve matches were made up by a single round robin, consisting of an even number of six home and six away matches against all the sides from the other pools.

For the Championship itself, there was one main league table. The top eight sides in the table qualified for the quarter-finals, followed by semi-finals and a grand final, with teams seeded 1 to 4 with home advantage for the lowest seeded side. The Regional Shield pools had no direct link to the play-offs and by extension the Championship itself, and it was possible to win a Regional Shield but not contest the play-offs.

== Teams ==
=== United Rugby Championship ===
Team	Country	Coach / Director of Rugby	Captain	Stadium	Capacity
Benetton	Italy	(Italy) Marco Bortolami	(Zimbabwe) Eli Snyman (Italy) Michele Lamaro	Stadio Comunale di Monigo	5,000
Bulls	South Africa	(South Africa) Jake White	(South Africa) Marcell Coetzee (South Africa) Ruan Nortjé	Loftus Versfeld Stadium	51,762
Cardiff	Wales	(England) Matt Sherratt	(Wales) Josh Turnbull	Cardiff Arms Park	12,125
Connacht	Ireland	(England) Peter Wilkins	(Ireland) Jack Carty	The Sportsground	8,129
Dragons	Wales	(Wales) Dai Flanagan	(Wales) Steffan Hughes	Rodney Parade	8,700
Edinburgh	Scotland	(South Africa) Sean Everitt	(Scotland) Grant Gilchrist (Scotland) Jamie Ritchie	Edinburgh Rugby Stadium; Murrayfield Stadium	7,800; 67,144
Glasgow Warriors	Scotland	(South Africa) Franco Smith	(Scotland) Kyle Steyn	Scotstoun Stadium	7,351
Leinster	Ireland	(Ireland) Leo Cullen	(Ireland) Caelan Doris	RDS Arena; Aviva Stadium	18,500; 51,700
Lions	South Africa	(South Africa) Ivan van Rooyen	(South Africa) Marius Louw	Ellis Park Stadium	62,567
Munster	Ireland	(England) Graham Rowntree	(Ireland) Peter O'Mahony	Thomond Park; Musgrave Park	25,600; 8,008
Ospreys	Wales	(England) Toby Booth	(Wales) Justin Tipuric	Swansea.com Stadium	20,827
Scarlets	Wales	(Wales) Dwayne Peel	(Wales) Josh Macleod	Parc y Scarlets	14,870
Sharks	South Africa	(New Zealand) John Plumtree	(South Africa) Siya Kolisi	Kings Park Stadium	52,000
Stormers	South Africa	(South Africa) John Dobson	(South Africa) Salmaan Moerat	DHL Stadium; Danie Craven Stadium	55,000; 16,000
Ulster	Ireland	(England) Dan McFarland	(Ireland) Iain Henderson	Ravenhill Stadium	18,196
Zebre Parma	Italy	(Italy) Fabio Roselli	(Italy) David Sisi	Stadio Sergio Lanfranchi	5,000

=== Locations ===
Location of Irish, Scottish and Welsh teams: 2023–24 United Rugby Championship (the United Kingdom and Ireland)	Location of Italian teams: 2023–24 United Rugby Championship (Northern Italy) Location of South African teams: 2023–24 United Rugby Championship (South Africa)

== Regional Shield competitions ==
This season, for the first time, regional shield standings were based entirely on performances against other teams within the same conference. Therefore, only six games for each team counted towards the regional shields.

2023–24 United Rugby Championship Regional Shield Pools
(Ireland) Irish Shield
	Team	P	W	D	L	PF	PA	PD	TF	TA	TBP	LBP	Pts	Pos overall
1	(Ireland) Leinster	6	4	0	2	129	93	+36	18	10	2	2	20	3rd
2	(Ireland) Ulster	6	4	0	2	130	126	+4	14	18	0	2	18	6th
3	(Ireland) Munster	6	2	0	4	118	109	+9	14	11	2	3	13	1st
4	(Ireland) Connacht	6	2	0	4	104	153	–49	13	20	0	2	10	11th
(Scotland) (Italy) Scottish/Italian Shield
	Team	P	W	D	L	PF	PA	PD	TF	TA	TBP	LBP	Pts	Pos overall
1	(Scotland) Glasgow Warriors	6	5	0	1	159	85	+74	24	5	3	1	24	4th
2	(Italy) Benetton	6	4	0	2	143	111	+32	18	15	3	0	19	7th
3	(Scotland) Edinburgh	6	3	0	3	121	124	–3	15	16	1	1	14	10th
4	(Italy) Zebre Parma	6	0	0	6	106	209	–103	10	31	0	2	2	16th
(South Africa) South African Shield
	Team	P	W	D	L	PF	PA	PD	TF	TA	TBP	LBP	Pts	Pos overall
1	(South Africa) Bulls	6	5	0	1	185	110	+75	24	12	4	1	25	2nd
2	(South Africa) Stormers	6	5	0	1	153	153	0	17	19	2	0	22	5th
3	(South Africa) Lions	6	2	0	4	155	147	+8	19	18	2	3	13	9th
4	(South Africa) Sharks	6	0	0	6	88	171	–83	11	22	0	3	3	14th
(Wales) Welsh Shield
	Team	P	W	D	L	PF	PA	PD	TF	TA	TBP	LBP	Pts	Pos overall
1	(Wales) Ospreys	6	5	0	1	147	103	+44	21	10	4	0	24	8th
2	(Wales) Scarlets	6	3	0	3	124	132	–8	16	15	3	1	16	13th
3	(Wales) Cardiff	6	2	0	4	169	150	+19	21	21	2	4	14	12th
4	(Wales) Dragons	6	2	0	4	91	146	–55	9	21	0	1	9	15th
If teams are level at any stage, tiebreakers are applied in the following order: 1. number of matches won 2. the difference between points for and points against 3. the number of tries scored 4. the most points scored 5. the difference between tries for and tries against 6. the fewest red cards received 7. the fewest yellow cards received
Green background indicates teams currently leading the regional shield. Upon the conclusion of the regular season, these teams win their respective regional shields. (S) : URC Shield champion

== URC league standings ==
2023–24 United Rugby Championship
	Team	P	W	D	L	PF	PA	PD	TF	TA	TB	LB	Pts
1	(Ireland) Munster	18	13	1	4	483	318	+165	65	38	11	3	68
2	(South Africa) Bulls (RU)	18	13	0	5	639	433	+206	85	54	11	3	66
3	(Ireland) Leinster	18	13	0	5	554	350	+204	81	43	11	2	65
4	(Scotland) Glasgow Warriors (CH)	18	13	0	5	519	353	+166	76	35	11	2	65
5	(South Africa) Stormers	18	12	0	6	468	348	+120	58	45	7	4	59
6	(Ireland) Ulster	18	11	0	7	437	409	+28	53	55	5	5	54
7	(Italy) Benetton	18	11	1	6	411	400	+11	51	56	6	2	54
8	(Wales) Ospreys	18	10	0	8	414	449	–35	53	53	8	2	50
9	(South Africa) Lions	18	9	0	9	526	398	+128	67	50	8	6	50
10	(Scotland) Edinburgh	18	11	0	7	416	397	+19	47	52	3	2	49
11	(Ireland) Connacht	18	9	0	9	404	432	–28	51	57	4	5	45
12	(Wales) Cardiff	18	4	1	13	384	410	–26	50	51	4	10	32
13	(Wales) Scarlets	18	5	0	13	313	575	–262	37	77	4	3	27
14	(South Africa) Sharks	18	4	0	14	343	431	–88	47	55	3	6	25
15	(Wales) Dragons	18	3	0	15	300	611	–311	36	84	1	3	16
16	(Italy) Zebre Parma	18	1	1	16	345	643	–298	42	94	4	5	15
If teams are level at any stage, tiebreakers are applied in the following order: 1. number of matches won; 2. the difference between points for and points against; 3. the number of tries scored; 4. the most points scored; 5. the difference between tries for and tries against; 6. the fewest red cards received; 7. the fewest yellow cards received.
Green background indicates teams that are in play-off places and earn a place in the 2024–25 European Champions Cup Pink background indicates teams that are in play-off places and earn a place in the 2024–25 European Challenge Cup; Yellow background indicates the team that won the 2023–24 European Challenge Cup and thus qualify for the 2024–25 European Champions Cup, but are not in a play-off place Plain background indicates teams that earn a place in the 2024–25 European Challenge Cup. Q: qualified for play-offs. H: home field advantage secured for quarter-and semi-final. h: home field advantage secured for quarter-final X: cannot reach play-offs. E: qualified for Champions Cup.

== European qualification ==
The national shields no longer factor into qualification for the European Rugby Champions Cup, in order to increase meritocracy and competition within the league.

Priority order for European Champions Cup qualification is:

- 2023–24 United Rugby Championship champions
- the European Rugby Champions Cup champions (if a URC team but not already qualified as above)
- the EPCR Challenge Cup champions (if a URC team but not already qualified as above)
- the next highest-ranked teams during regular season play not already qualified as above, until eight overall qualifiers have been selected.

All 16 teams, however, are guaranteed entry into one of the two competitions.

The following teams have therefore confirmed their qualification for the European Rugby Champions Cup for the 2024–25 season:

South Africa via 2023–24 EPCR Challenge Cup

- Sharks, who defeated English side Gloucester 36–22 in the final of the 2023–24 European Rugby Challenge Cup.

No URC side won a place with victory in the 2023–24 European Rugby Champions Cup, Leinster losing in the final to Toulouse.

The following teams therefore confirmed their qualification for the European Rugby Champions Cup for the 2024–25 season by placement in the URC regular season:

Ireland

- Munster, 1st in the regular season table
- Leinster, 3rd
- Ulster, 6th

South Africa

- Bulls, 2nd
- Stormers, 5th

Scotland

- Glasgow Warriors, 4th

The final Champions Cup place was therefore to be taken by either Benetton (7th) or Ospreys (8th). If Ospreys won the URC outright, they will take the final berth in the Champions Cup as URC Champion. Any other result would mean Benetton qualify for the Champions Cup in 2024–25. Osprey's quarter final defeat confirmed Benetton Rugby in the final berth. Wales will have no representative in the 2024–25 Champions Cup.

Italy

- Benetton, 7th

Zebre, Dragons, Scarlets, Cardiff Rugby, Edinburgh, Connacht, Lions and Ospreys have qualified for the European Rugby Challenge Cup for 2024–25. All five nations in URC will be represented in the competition.

== Matches ==
The following are the match results for the 2023–24 United Rugby Championship regular season:

Home \ Away	BEN	BUL	CAR	CON	DRA	EDI	GLA	LEI	LIO	MUN	OSP	SCA	SHA	STO	ULS	ZEB
Benetton				18–14	36–19	31–6	9–19		15–10	13–13	18–13			20–17		36–14
Bulls	56–35			53–27			40–34		30–28	22–27	61–24	63–21	44–10	40–22		
Cardiff	22–23	12–18		12–16	55–21	7–24		20–33			29–33	23–29		31–24		
Connacht							34–26	22–24	14–38	22–9	34–26	26–10		12–16	22–20	54–16
Dragons		10–31	9–16	27–34		17–22		10–33			20–5	13–12		21–44		20–13
Edinburgh	22–24	31–23		25–22			19–14		17–16	26–29	19–15	43–18				40–14
Glasgow Warriors	26–12		17–13		40–7	22–10		43–25					21–10	20–9	33–20	38–26
Leinster	47–18	47–14		33–7		36–27				21–16	61–14	54–5	34–13		21–22	
Lions		10–25	34–13		49–24		44–21	44–12		13–33			40–10	33–35		61–19
Munster			20–15	47–12	45–14		40–29	3–9					34–21	10–3	29–24	45–29
Ospreys			27–21		26–13		23–31		36–21	17–27		31–9	19–5		19–17	34–31
Scarlets	16–13		31–25		32–15		3–45		23–24	7–42	11–25		27–32		20–31	
Sharks	24–25	14–26	14–36	12–13	69–14	23–13			18–20					23–25	22–12	
Stormers		26–20				43–21		42–12	29–24		21–27	52–7	16–15		13–7	31–7
Ulster	38–34	26–19	19–17	20–19	49–26	24–27		23–21	24–17	21–14						
Zebre Parma	24–31	29–54	22–22			19–24	9–40	7–31				18–32	12–10		36–40	

Updated to match(es) played on 18 May 2024
Colours: Green: home team win; Yellow: draw; Red: away team win; Blue: upcoming matches

== Regular season ==
=== Round 1 ===
21 October 2023
13:00

(2 BP) Zebre Parma (Italy)	36–40	(Ireland) Ulster (1 BP)
Try: Licata (2) 4', 13'; Pani 22'; Gregory 40'; Gesi (2) 41', 70'; Con: Prisciantelli (3) 5', 14', 23'	Report	Try: Flannery 9'; Lowry 16'; Stockdale (2) 28', 60'; Stewart (2) 52', 66'; Con: Doak (5) 11', 17', 29', 53', 68'

Stadio Sergio Lanfranchi, Parma
Attendance: 1,600
Referee: Adam Jones (Wales)

21 October 2023
16:00

(1 BP) Connacht (Ireland)	34–26	(Wales) Ospreys
Try: Blade (3) 11', 23', 33'; Forde 56'; Con: Hanrahan (4) 12', 24', 33', 57'; Pen: Hanrahan (2) 2', 5'	Report	Try: Giles 40'; Morgan-Williams 48'; Ratti 52'; R. Davies 74'; Con: Walsh (3) 49', 53', 75'

The Sportsground, Galway
Attendance: 3,699
Referee: Federico Vedovelli (Italy)

21 October 2023
16:05

(2 BP) Lions (South Africa)	33–35	(South Africa) Stormers (1 BP)
Try: Botha 5'; Van Wyk 45'; Venter 61'; Van den Berg 71'; F. Horn 78'; Con: Hendrikse (2) 5', 46'; Nohamba (2) 72', 79'	Report	Try: Feinberg-Mngomezulu (2) 8', 41'; Dweba 33'; Jantjies 37'; Con: Blommetjies (3) 9', 34', 38'; Pen: Feinberg-Mngomezulu (2) 17', 54'; Blommetjies 19'

Ellis Park Stadium, Johannesburg
Attendance: 6,672
Referee: Morné Ferreira (South Africa)

21 October 2023
15:05

(1 BP) Dragons (Wales)	17–22	(Scotland) Edinburgh
Try: Tomkinson 1'; Baldwin 16'; Con: Evans (2) 2', 18'; Pen: Evans 45'	Report	Try: Vellacott 65'; Con: Healy 65'; Pen: Healy (5) 29', 42', 55', 72', 80'

Rodney Parade, Newport
Attendance: 4,212
Referee: Eoghan Cross (Ireland)

21 October 2023
17:15

(1 BP) Cardiff (Wales)	22–23	(Italy) Benetton
Try: Belcher 17'; Carré 26'; Bevan 31'; Con: De Beer (2) 19', 27'; Pen: De Beer 60'	Report	Try: Lucchesi 36'; Albornoz 65'; Con: Umaga (2) 37', 66'; Pen: Umaga (3) 10', 47', 79'

Cardiff Arms Park, Cardiff
Attendance: 5,326
Referee: Frank Murphy (Ireland)

21 October 2023
17:15

(1 BP) Munster (Ireland)	34–21	(South Africa) Sharks
Try: Edogbo 20'; Barron 25'; Frisch 40'; Conway 66'; Coughlan 77'; Con: Carbery (3) 21', 26', 41'; Pen: Carbery 44'	Report	Try: Kok 37'; Janse van Rensburg 47'; Fassi 80+1'; Con: Bosch (3) 38', 48', 80+1'

Thomond Park, Limerick
Attendance: 11,239
Referee: Gianluca Gnecchi (Italy)

22 October 2023
15:00

(1 BP) Bulls (South Africa)	63–21	(Wales) Scarlets
Try: Nortjé 2'; Hanekom (2) 5', 14'; Grobbelaar 24'; Kriel 44'; Gans (2) 51', 57'; Van der Merwe 62'; Simelane 65'; Con: Goosen (9) 3', 6', 15', 25', 45', 51', 58', 63', 66'	Report	Try: McNicholl 30'; Plumtree (2) 38', 68'; Con: Lloyd (3) 31', 39', 68'

Loftus Versfeld Stadium, Pretoria
Attendance: 3,359
Referee: Mike Adamson (Scotland)

22 October 2023
16:00

(1 BP) Glasgow Warriors (Scotland)	43–25	(Ireland) Leinster
Try: McKay 12'; Cancelliere 20'; Jones 32'; Fraser 37'; Horne 52'; Matthews 74'; Con: Jordan (2) 13', 33'; Horne 75'	Report	Try: Boyle 28'; Barron 44'; T. O'Brien 71'; Con: H. Byrne (2) 29', 45'; Pen: H. Byrne (2) 15', 18'

Scotstoun Stadium, Glasgow
Attendance: 6,221
Referee: Craig Evans (Wales)

=== Round 2 ===
28 October 2023
13:00

(1 BP) Ospreys (Wales)	34–31	(Italy) Zebre Parma (2 BP)
Try: Morgan-Williams 15'; Protheroe 21'; Nagy 42'; Smith 49'; Con: Walsh (3) 16', 22', 43'; O. Williams 50'; Pen: Walsh 35'; O. Williams 77'	Report	Try: Gesi (2) 3', 24; Bigi 8'; Gregory (2) 61', 80'; Con: Prisciantelli (3) 4', 25', 62'

Swansea.com Stadium, Swansea
Attendance: 3,017
Referee: Ian Kenny (Scotland)

28 October 2023
15:00

Connacht (Ireland)	34–26	(Scotland) Glasgow Warriors (1 BP)
Try: Kilgallen (2) 18', 60'; Tierney-Martin 45'; Con: Forde (2) 46', 61'; Pen: Hanrahan (3) 4', 8', 14'; Forde (2) 52', 58'	Report	Try: Rowe 15'; Penaltry try 24'; Jordan 40'; Dobie 79'; Con: Jordan (2) 16', 79'

The Sportsground, Galway
Attendance: 4,109
Referee: Adam Jones (Wales)

28 October 2023
16:00

(1 BP) Stormers (South Africa)	52–7	(Wales) Scarlets
Try: Theunissen (2) 7', 12'; De Wet (2) 25', 42'; Blommetjies 28'; Loader 35'; Feinberg-Mngomezulu 58'; Skosan 71'; Con: Blommetjies (2) 7', 29'; Feinberg-Mngomezulu (4) 36', 43', 59', 72'	Report	Try: Hardy 16'; Con: Lloyd 17'

Danie Craven Stadium, Stellenbosch
Attendance: 4,141
Referee: Sam Grove-White (Scotland)

28 October 2023
16:55

(1 BP) Leinster (Ireland)	34–13	(South Africa) Sharks
Try: Larmour 4'; Deegan 21'; Russell (2) 52', 80'; T. O'Brien 65'; Con: H. Byrne (2) 22', 54'; Prendergast 80+1'; Pen: H. Byrne 48'	Report	Try: Richardson 79'; Con: Chamberlain 79'; Pen: Bosch (2) 1', 9'

RDS Arena, Dublin
Attendance: 10,404
Referee: Federico Vedovelli (Italy)

28 October 2023
17:00

Edinburgh (Scotland)	17–16	(South Africa) Lions (1 BP)
Try: Crosbie 13'; Ashman 61'; Con: Healy 13', 63'; Pen: Healy 41'	Report	Try: F. Horn 57'; Con: Hendrikse 58'; Pen: Hendrikse (3) 15', 38', 68'

Edinburgh Rugby Stadium, Edinburgh
Attendance: 5,408
Referee: Chris Busby (Ireland)

29 October 2023
15:00

Benetton (Italy)	13–13	(Ireland) Munster
Try: Smith 36'; Con: Umaga 37'; Pen: Umaga (2) 9', 15'	Report	Try: Ahern 79'; Con: Carbery 80'; Pen: Carbery (2) 13', 73'

Stadio Comunale di Monigo, Treviso
Attendance: 5,000
Referee: Morné Ferreira (South Africa)

29 October 2023
14:30

(1 BP) Dragons (Wales)	9–16	(Wales) Cardiff
Pen: O'Brien (3) 9', 36', 78'	Report	Try: Grady; Con: De Beer 33'; Pen: De Beer (3) 12', 18', 66'

Rodney Parade, Newport
Attendance: 5,272
Referee: Frank Murphy (Ireland)

29 October 2023
17:00

Ulster (Ireland)	26–19	(South Africa) Bulls (1 BP)
Try: Stewart 9'; Stockdale 28'; Con: Doak (2) 10', 30'; Pen: Doak (4) 42', 50', 63', 73'	Report	Try: G. Steenekamp 35'; De Klerk 40'; E. Louw 68'; Con: Goosen (2) 36', 69'

Ravenhill Stadium, Belfast
Attendance: 10,181
Referee: Gianluca Gnecchi (Italy)

=== Round 3 ===
3 November 2023
19:35

Glasgow Warriors (Scotland)	20–9	(South Africa) Stormers
Try: Tuipulotu 24'; Matthews (2) 28', 40'; Con: Horne 24'; Pen: Horne 33'	Report	Pen: Feinberg-Mngomezulu (3) 19', 27', 36'

Scotstoun Stadium, Glasgow
Attendance: 6,191
Referee: Chris Busby (Ireland)

3 November 2023
19:35

Ospreys (Wales)	19–5	(South Africa) Sharks
Try: Walsh 14'; Nagy 28'; K. Williams 39'; Con: Walsh (2) 29', 40'	Report	Try: Buthelezi 3'

Twickenham Stoop
Attendance: 7,183
Referee: Mike Adamson (Scotland)

4 November 2023
14:00

(1 BP) Zebre Parma (Italy)	29–54	(South Africa) Bulls (1 BP)
Try: Bianchi 8'; Prisciantelli 29'; Gregory 56'; Pani 67'; Con: Prisciantelli (3) 30', 57', 68'; Pen: Prisciantelli 36'	Report	Try: Van der Merwe (2) 16', 26'; Petersen 20'; Williams (2) 42', 74'; Kriel (3) 50', 69', 78'; Con: Goosen (6) 17', 21', 27', 43', 52', 75'; C. Smith 79'

Stadio Sergio Lanfranchi, Parma
Attendance: 1,800
Referee: Frank Murphy (Ireland)

4 November 2023
15:05

(1 BP) Leinster (Ireland)	36–27	(Scotland) Edinburgh
Try: Barron 20'; Deegan 32'; Frawley 39'; T. O'Brien 51'; Culhane 57'; Con: H. Byrne (4) 21', 33', 40', 52'; Pen: Prendergast 70'	Report	Try: Lang 53'; Boyle 66'; Venter 73'; Con: Healy (3) 53', 67', 73'; Pen: Healy (2) 17', 36'

RDS Arena, Dublin
Attendance: 14,434
Referee: Marius van der Westhuizen (South Africa)

4 November 2023
17:15

(1 BP) Scarlets (Wales)	31–25	(Wales) Cardiff (1 BP)
Try: Craig 19'; McNicholl 37'; G. Davies 52'; Fifita 64'; Con: Lloyd (4) 20', 39', 54', 65'; Pen: Lloyd 73'	Report	Try: Bevan 4'; Carré 28'; Cabango 75'; Con: De Beer (2) 6', 30'; Pen: De Beer (2) 43', 60'

Parc y Scarlets, Llanelli
Attendance: 6,325
Referee: Adam Jones (Wales)

4 November 2023
17:15

(1 BP) Munster (Ireland)	45–14	(Wales) Dragons
Try: R. Scannell 13'; G. Coombes 17'; Nash (2) 21', 73'; Ahern 47'; Casey 53'; Gleeson 64'; Con: Butler (4) 15', 48', 54', 65'; Crowley 74'	Report	Try: R. Woodman 35'; Seiuli 80'; Con: Reed (2) 36', 80+1'

Musgrave Park, Cork
Attendance: 8,171
Referee: Sam Grove-White (Scotland)

4 November 2023
19:35

Connacht (Ireland)	22–20	(Ireland) Ulster (1 BP)
Try: Forde 48'; Farrell 53'; Kilgallen 73'; Con: Carty (2) 48', 54'; Pen: Carty 19'	Report	Try: Flannery 33'; Shanahan 41'; Con: Flannery (2) 34', 42'; Pen: Flannery (2) 22', 36'

The Sportsground, Galway
Attendance: 5,468
Referee: Morné Ferreira (South Africa)

5 November 2023
14:30

Benetton (Italy)	15–10	(South Africa) Lions (1 BP)
Try: Fekitoa 4'; Mendy 70'; Con: Albornoz 6'; Pen: Umaga 55'	Report	Try: Ntlabakanye 62'; Con: Nohamba 63'; Pen: Hendrikse 17'

Stadio Comunale di Monigo, Treviso
Attendance: 5,000
Referee: Peter Martin (Ireland)

=== Round 4 ===
10 November 2023
18:30

Zebre Parma (Italy)	12–10	(South Africa) Sharks (1 BP)
Pen: Prisciantelli (3) 6', 59', 66'; Trulla 13'	Report	Try: Wright 15'; Con: Chamberlain 17'; Pen: Chamberlain 9'

Stadio Sergio Lanfranchi, Parma
Attendance: 1,200
Referee: Peter Martin (Ireland)

10 November 2023
19:35

(1 BP) Cardiff (Wales)	12–18	(South Africa) Bulls
Try: Grady 22'; Lee-Lo 52'; Con: De Beer 53'	Report	Try: Papier 10'; De Klerk 13'; Con: C. Smith 14'; Pen: C. Smith (2) 42', 61'

Cardiff Arms Park, Cardiff
Attendance: 6,113
Referee: Sam Grove-White (Scotland)

10 November 2023
19:35

Ulster (Ireland)	21–14	(Ireland) Munster (1 BP)
Try: Stockdale 26'; Timoney 67'; Con: Doak 68'; Pen: Doak (3) 13', 46', 63'	Report	Try: Casey (2) 7', 17'; Con: Crowley (2) 8', 19'

Ravenhill Stadium, Belfast
Attendance: 14,960
Referee: Frank Murphy (Ireland)

11 November 2023
16:00

Benetton (Italy)	20–17	(South Africa) Stormers (1 BP)
Try: Zanon 23'; Izekor 55'; Con: Albornoz 24'; Umaga 56'; Pen: Albornoz 34'	Report	Try: Gelant 30'; Ntubeni 36'; Skosan 46'; Con: J.-L. du Plessis 47'

Stadio Comunale di Monigo, Treviso
Attendance: 5,000
Referee: Craig Evans (Wales)

11 November 2023
17:15

Ospreys (Wales)	23–31	(Scotland) Glasgow Warriors (1 BP)
Try: K. Williams 5'; Morgan-Williams 56'; Con: Walsh (2) 6', 57'; Pen: Walsh (3) 25', 55', 73'	Report	Try: Matthews (2) 36', 44'; Vailanu 51'; Dell 80'; Con: Weir (4) 38', 45', 52', 80+1'; Pen: Weir 76'

Swansea.com Stadium, Swansea
Attendance: 4,355
Referee: Andrea Piardi (Italy)

11 November 2023
17:15

(1 BP) Scarlets (Wales)	23–24	(South Africa) Lions
Try: Rogers 16'; Elias 68'; Con: Lloyd (2) 18', 69'; Pen: Lloyd (3) 3', 47', 54'	Report	Try: Louw 21'; Botha 51'; Van Wyk 76'; Con: Nohamba (3) 41', 52', 78'; Pen: Nohamba 73'

Parc y Scarlets, Llanelli
Attendance: 6,202
Referee: Chris Busby (Ireland)

11 November 2023
19:35

Edinburgh (Scotland)	25–22	(Ireland) Connacht (1 BP)
Try: Goosen 4'; Vellacott 45'; Bennett 66'; Con: Healy (2) 6', 47'; Pen: Healy 55'; Drop: Healy 80'	Report	Try: O'Halloran 50'; Joyce 57'; Prendergast 75'; Con: Carty 6'; Hanrahan 76'; Pen: Carty 34'

Edinburgh Rugby Stadium, Edinburgh
Attendance: 6,717
Referee: Ben Whitehouse (Wales)

12 November 2023
13:15

Dragons (Wales)	10–33	(Ireland) Leinster (1 BP)
Try: Owen 49'; Con: Evans 49'; Pen: Evans 14'	Report	Try: Sheehan 8'; Clarkson 37'; Frawley 40'; Ngatai 61'; Penny 80+1'; Con: R. Byrne (4) 9', 39', 42', 80+2'

Rodney Parade, Newport
Attendance: 4,555
Referee: Gianluca Gnecchi (Italy)

=== Round 5 ===
17 November
19:35

(1 BP) Edinburgh (Scotland)	31–23	(South Africa) Bulls
Try: Ashman (2) 32', 43'; Van der Merwe 48'; Mata 63'; Con: Healy 64'; Pen: Healy (3) 15', 18', 80'	Report	Try: Williams 8'; E. Louw 65'; Con: Goosen 9'; Van der Walt 66'; Pen: Goosen (2) 22', 28'; Van der Walt 72'

Edinburgh Rugby Stadium, Edinburgh
Attendance: 6,759
Referee: Chris Busby (Ireland)

17 November
19:35

Ulster (Ireland)	24–17	(South Africa) Lions (1 BP)
Try: Hume 28'; Stockdale 41'; Herring 46'; Con: Doak (3) 29', 42', 47'; Pen: Cooney 67'	Report	Try: Kriel 10'; Sirgel 34'; Con: Nohamba (2) 12', 35'; Pen: Nohamba 35'

Ravenhill Stadium, Belfast
Attendance: 11,471
Referee: Andrea Piardi (Italy)

17 November 2023
20:35

Zebre Parma (Italy)	22–22	(Wales) Cardiff
Try: Smith 34'; Morisi 37'; Krumov 80+5'; Con: Prisciantelli (2) 35', 80+6'; Pen: Prisciantelli 60'	Report	Try: Thomas 10'; Timani 54'; Grady 71'; Con: De Beer (2) 11', 55'; Pen: De Beer 66'

Stadio Sergio Lanfranchi, Parma
Attendance: 2,000
Referee: Mike Adamson (Scotland)

18 November 2023
17:00

(1 BP) Sharks (South Africa)	12–13	(Ireland) Connacht
Try: Notshe 31'; Kok 49'; Con: Bosch 51'	Report	Try: O'Brien 7'; Con: Hanrahan 8'; Pen: Hanrahan (2) 34', 66'

Kings Park Stadium, Durban
Attendance: 8,300
Referee: Craig Evans (Wales)

18 November 2023
17:15

Dragons (Wales)	20–5	(Wales) Ospreys
Try: Roberts 37'; Dyer 65'; Con: Evans (2) 38', 66'; Pen: Evans (2) 24', 30'	Report	Try: Protheroe 4'

Rodney Parade, Newport
Attendance: 6,277
Referee: Ben Whitehouse (Wales)

18 November 2023
17:15

Munster (Ireland)	10–3	(South Africa) Stormers (1 BP)
Try: Edogbo 39'; Con: Crowley 40'; Pen: Crowley 14'	Report	Pen: Feinberg-Mngomezulu 45'

Thomond Park, Limerick
Attendance: 15,045
Referee: Sam Grove-White (Scotland)

18 November 2023
19:35

(1 BP) Leinster (Ireland)	54–5	(Wales) Scarlets
Try: Prendergast 3'; J. O'Brien 8'; Deegan (2) 15', 79; Ringrose 49'; Osborne (2) 60', 73; Boyle 66'; Con: Prendergast (3) 9', 16', 50'; R. Byrne (4) 61', 67', 74', 80+1'	Report	Try: J. Williams 26'

RDS Arena, Dublin
Attendance: 15,664
Referee: Hollie Davidson (Scotland)

18 November 2023
19:35

(1 BP) Glasgow Warriors (Scotland)	26–12	(Italy) Benetton
Try: McKay 16'; Rowe 20'; Cancelliere 54'; Horne 66'; Con: Horne (3) 17', 21', 67'	Report	Pen: Albornoz (3) 6', 10', 22'; Umaga 59'

Scotstoun Stadium, Glasgow
Attendance: 5,685
Referee: Andrew Brace (Ireland)

=== Round 6 ===
24 November 2023
19:35

(1 BP) Cardiff (Wales)	31–24	(South Africa) Stormers (1 BP)
Try: Hamer-Webb 23'; Belcher 33'; Grady 53'; Litterick 80+1'; Con: De Beer (4) 24', 34', 54', 80+4'; Pen: De Beer 63'	Report	Try: Venter 4'; Nel (2) 12', 50'; Con: Feinberg-Mngomezulu (3) 5', 13', 51'; Pen: Feinberg-Mngomezulu 27'

Cardiff Arms Park, Cardiff
Attendance: 6,815
Referee: Hollie Davidson (Scotland)

24 November 2023
19:35

(1 BP) Edinburgh (Scotland)	22–24	(Italy) Benetton
Try: Kinghorn (2) 2', 38'; Currie 13'; Con: Healy (2) 3', 40'; Pen: Healy 54'	Report	Try: Mendy 31'; Zanon (2) 42', 67'; Con: Umaga (3) 32', 43', 68'; Pen: Umaga 35'

Edinburgh Rugby Stadium, Edinburgh
Attendance: 6,527
Referee: Aimee Barrett-Theron (South Africa)

25 November 2023
14:55

(1 BP) Lions (South Africa)	61–19	(Italy) Zebre Parma
Try: Kriel 4'; Van der Merwe (2) 9', 71'; Q. Horn 15'; F. Horn 28'; Van Wyk (2) 36', 49'; Van den Berg 60'; Tshituka 79'; Con: Nohamba (7) 5', 16', 30', 37', 51', 61', 72'; Alberts 80'	Report	Try: Gesi (2) 33', 44'; Trulla 56'; Con: Montemauri (2) 34', 45'

Ellis Park Stadium, Johannesburg
Attendance: 3,120
Referee: Craig Evans (Wales)

25 November 2023
17:00

(1 BP) Bulls (South Africa)	53–27	(Ireland) Connacht
Try: Van der Merwe 11'; Louw 19'; Nortjé 32' le Roux 38'; Carr 56'; Kriel 65'; Smith 72'; Con: Van der Walt (5) 20', 33', 39', 57', 66'; Smith 73'; Pen: Van der Walt (2) 9', 28'	Report	Try: Kilgallen 34'; McElroy 46'; Hurley-Langton 77'; Con: Carty (2) 35', 47'; Hanrahan 77'; Pen: Carty (2) 7', 31'

Loftus Versfeld Stadium, Pretoria
Attendance: 9,228
Referee: Gianluca Gnecchi (Italy)

25 November 2023
19:05

(1 BP) Sharks (South Africa)	69–14	(Wales) Dragons
Try: Fassi (2) 11', 75'; Mapimpi 20'; Kok 42'; Etzebeth 47'; Williams (2) 54', 71'; Buthelezi 61'; Labuschagne 64'; Am 78'; Con: Bosch (5) 13', 48', 55', 62', 65'; Chamberlain (3) 72', 76', 80'; Pen: Bosch 7'	Report	Try: Blacker 27'; Dyer 56'; Con: Evans 28'; Williams 57'

Kings Park Stadium, Durban
Attendance: 12,659
Referee: Frank Murphy (Ireland)

25 November 2023
18:30

Leinster (Ireland)	21–16	(Ireland) Munster (1 BP)
Try: Gibson-Park 24'; Sheehan 34'; Larmour 65'; Con: Frawley (3) 25', 35', 66'	Report	Try: Casey 5'; Con: Crowley 6'; Pen: Crowley 13', 52', 73'

Aviva Stadium, Dublin
Attendance: 49,246
Referee: Chris Busby (Ireland)

25 November 2023
19:35

(1 BP) Glasgow Warriors (Scotland)	33–20	(Ireland) Ulster
Try: Kennedy 20'; George Turner 41'; Rowe 50'; Matthews (2) 58', 70'; Con: Jordan (4) 21', 42', 59', 71'	Report	Try: Stewart 5'; Cooney 10'; Con: Cooney (2) 6', 11'; Pen: Cooney 56'; Doak 63'

Scotstoun Stadium, Glasgow
Attendance: 7,216
Referee: Ben Whitehouse (Wales)

26 November 2023
15:00

(1 BP) Ospreys (Wales)	31–9	(Wales) Scarlets
Try: K. Williams (2) 7', 18; Morris (1) 50'; Edwards (1) 75'; Con: Walsh (3) 9', 19', 52'; Edwards (1) 75'; Pen: Walsh (1) 34'	Report	Pen: Lloyd (3) 4', 12', 26'

Swansea.com Stadium, Swansea
Attendance: 8,489
Referee: Mike English (Wales)

=== Round 7 ===
1 December 2023
19:35

(1 BP) Munster (Ireland)	40–29	(Scotland) Glasgow Warriors (1 BP)
Try: Edogbo 7'; Ahern (2) 12', 36'; Barron 15'; Nankivell 48'; Hodnett 64'; Con: Jack Crowley (5/6) 7', 16', 37', 49', 65'		Try: Vailanu 26'; Matthews 41'; Darge 54'; Penaltry try 61'; Fraser 78'; Con: Weir (1/4) 78'

Musgrave Park, Cork
Attendance: 8,400
Referee: Marius van der Westhuizen (South Africa)

2 December 2023
15:00

(1 BP) Bulls (South Africa)	44–10	(South Africa) Sharks
Try: Gans (2) 13', 22'; Arendse 32'; Van der Merwe (2) 39', 71'; E. Louw 62'; Con: Goosen (4/6) 14', 22', 63', 72'; Pen: Goosen (2/2) 10', 66'		Try: Penaltry try 45'; Pen: Bosch (1/3) 2'

Loftus Versfeld Stadium, Pretoria
Attendance: 24,515
Referee: Cwengile Jadezweni (South Africa)

2 December 2023
15:00

(1 BP) Cardiff (Wales)	23–29	(Wales) Scarlets (1 BP)
Try: Williams 3'; Winnett 10'; Con: De Beer (2/2) 4', 11'; Pen: De Beer (3/4) 42', 60', 76'		Try: Davies (2) 12', 39'; Craig 23'; S. Evans 61'; McNicholl 70'; Con: Lloyd (2/5) 13', 40'

Cardiff Arms Park, Cardiff
Attendance: 8,282
Referee: Ben Whitehouse (Wales)

2 December 2023
17:05

(1 BP) Lions (South Africa)	49–24	(Wales) Dragons
Try: Van Wyk 11'; Q. Horn 28'; Van der Merwe (2) 43', 76'; Van den Berg 57'; F. Horn 70'; Con: Nohamba (5/6) 29', 44', 59', 71', 78'; Pen: Nohamba (3/3) 22', 33', 53'		Try: Harrison Keddie 5'; Hewitt 48'; Roberts 66'; Con: Reed (3/3) 6', 50', 67'; Pen: Reed (1/1) 39'

Ellis Park Stadium, Johannesburg
Attendance: 2,576
Referee: Andrea Piardi (Italy)

2 December 2023
19:15

(1 BP) Stormers (South Africa)	31–7	(Italy) Zebre Parma
Try: Roos 13'; Nel 36'; Skosan 44'; Zas 67'; Willemse 74'; Con: Libbok (3/5) 14', 45', 75'		Try: Fusco 41'; Con: Montemauri (1/1) 42'

Danie Craven Stadium, Stellenbosch
Attendance: 6,196
Referee: Eoghan Cross (Ireland)

2 December 2023
17:15

(2 BP) Ulster (Ireland)	24–27	(Scotland) Edinburgh
Try: Stewart (2) 5', 28'; Baloucoune 73'; Hume 80'; Con: Cooney (1/2) 6'; Doak (1/2) 80+1'	Report	Try: Vellacott 24'; Schoeman 58'; Hislop 69'; Con: Healy (3/3) 25', 60', 71'; Pen: Healy (2/2) 16', 40'

Ravenhill Stadium, Belfast
Attendance: 12,403
Referee: Federico Vedovelli (Italy)

2 December 2023
19:35

(1 BP) Connacht (Ireland)	22–24	(Ireland) Leinster (1 BP)
Try: Hawkshaw 8'; Blade 63'; Kilgallen 69'; Con: Hanrahan (2/3) 65', 70'; Pen: Hanrahan (1/1) 22'		Try: Ngatai 34'; Jenkins 50'; Kelleher 55'; Frawley 80+1'; Con: H. Byrne (2/4) 35', 51'

The Sportsground, Galway
Attendance: 8,129
Referee: Andrew Brace (Ireland)

2 December 2023
20:35

Benetton (Italy)	18–13	(Wales) Ospreys (1 BP)
Try: Bernasconi 16'; Da Re 76'; Con: Umaga (1/2) 17'; Pen: Jacob Umaga (2/2) 64', 68'		Try: Nagy 41'; L. Davies 60'; Pen: Edwards (1/1) 12'

Stadio Comunale di Monigo, Treviso
Attendance: 4,327
Referee: Sam Grove-White (Scotland)

=== Round 8 ===
22 December 2023
19:35

Glasgow Warriors (Scotland)	22–10	(Scotland) Edinburgh
Try: Rowe 16'; Matthews 66'; Miller 73'; Con: Horne (2) 67', 74'; Pen: Thompson 5'	Report	Try: Nel 33'; Con: Healy 33'; Pen: Healy 47'

Scotstoun Stadium, Glasgow
Attendance: 7,172
Referee: Sam Grove-White (Scotland)

22 December 2023
19:35

Ulster (Ireland)	20–19	(Ireland) Connacht (1 BP)
Try: Warwick 2'; Timoney 18'; Con: Cooney (2) 3', 20'; Pen: Cooney (2) 50', 65'	Report	Try: Aki 8'; Hurley-Langton 59'; Bolton 68'; Con: Carty 9'; Hanrahan 69'

Ravenhill Stadium, Belfast
Attendance: 15,365
Referee: Eoghan Cross (Ireland)

23 December 2023
14:00

(1 BP) Zebre Parma (Italy)	24–31	(Italy) Benetton (1 BP)
Try: Pani 2'; Bianchi 60'; Krumov 80'; Con: Prisciantelli (3) 4', 61', 80+1'; Pen: Prisciantelli 9'	Report	Try: Bernasconi 12'; Menoncello 25'; Umaga 37'; Odogwu 43'; Con: Umaga (4) 13', 26', 38', 44'; Pen: Umaga 76'

Stadio Sergio Lanfranchi, Parma
Attendance: 4,701
Referee: Filippo Russo (Italy)

23 December 2023
19:00

Stormers (South Africa)	26–20	(South Africa) Bulls (1 BP)
Try: J-L du Plessis 24'; Nel 59'; Con: Libbok (2) 25', 60'; Pen: Libbok (3) 4', 19', 44'; Drop: Willemse 10'	Report	Try: Ludwig 12'; Arendse 16'; Moodie 51'; Con: Goosen 52'; Pen: C. Smith 72'

Cape Town Stadium, Cape Town
Attendance: 39,925
Referee: Marius van der Westhuizen (South Africa)

26 December 2023
15:00

(1 BP) Cardiff (Wales)	55–21	(Wales) Dragons
Try: Carré (2) 2', 10'; T. Williams (2) 17', 35'; Thomas 14'; Botham 22', 30'; Assiratti 48'; Winnett 76'; Con: De Beer (5/9) 3', 11', 15'23', 37'	Report	Try: Keddie (2) 7', 51'; Penaltry try 58'; Con: Evans (2/2) 7', 52'

Cardiff Arms Park, Cardiff
Attendance: 12,000
Referee: Ben Whitehouse (Wales)

26 December 2023
17:15

Scarlets (Wales)	11–25	(Wales) Ospreys
Try: G. Davies 48'; Pen: Lloyd (2) 68', 80'	Report	Try: Morgan-Williams 48', Parry 73', Walsh 80+1'; Con: O. Williams (2) 49', 80+2'; Drop: O. Williams 64'

Parc y Scarlets, Llanelli
Attendance: 11,282
Referee: Craig Evans (Wales)

26 December 2023
19:35

(1 BP) Munster (Ireland)	3–9	(Ireland) Leinster
Pen: Crowley 51'	Report	Pen: H. Byrne (3) 1', 15', 80'

Thomond Park, Limerick
Attendance: 25,600
Referee: Andrew Brace (Ireland)

6 January 2023
17:00

(1 BP) Sharks (South Africa)	18–20	(South Africa) Lions
Try: Mapimpi 21'; Williams 32'; Con: Bosch (1/2) 22'; Pen: Bosch (1/1) 12'; Drop: Bosch (1/1) 30'	Report	Try: Penaltry try 52'; Louw 76'; Con: Sanele Nohamba (1/1) 78'; Pen: Sanele Nohamba (2/4) 8', 59'

Kings Park Stadium, Durban
Attendance: 19,703
Referee: Morné Ferreira (South Africa)

=== Round 9 ===
30 December 2023
14:30

(1 BP) Benetton (Italy)	36–14	(Italy) Zebre Parma
Try: Lucchesi 3'; Garbisi 12'; Mendy 38'; Izekor 44'; Negri 58'; Albornoz 63'; Con: Smith (2); Albornoz	Report	Try: Prisciantelli 22'; Bigi 55'; Con: Prisciantelli (2)

Stadio Comunale di Monigo, Treviso
Attendance: 5,500
Referee: Gianluca Gnecchi (Italy)

30 December 2023
15:00

Edinburgh (Scotland)	19–14	(Scotland) Glasgow Warriors (1 BP)
Try: Currie 26'; Van der Merwe 71'; Pen: Healy (3) 52', 64', 77'	Reports	Try: Matthews 3'; McDowall 59'; Con: Horne (2) 4', 60'

Murrayfield Stadium, Edinburgh
Attendance: 37,904
Referee: Mike Adamson (Scotland)

30 December 2023
19:00

Stormers (South Africa)	16–15	(South Africa) Sharks (1 BP)
Try: Smith 15'; Con: Libbok 16'; Pen: Libbok (3) 32', 45', 60'	Reports	Try: Kok 36'; Rahl 57'; Con: Bosch 58'; Pen: Bosch 53'

Cape Town Stadium, Cape Town
Attendance: 37,246
Referee: AJ Jacobs (South Africa)

1 January 2024
15:00

Connacht (Ireland)	22–9	(Ireland) Munster
Try: Aungier 77'; Con: Hanrahan 78'; Pen: Hanrahan (5) 16', 45', 59', 66', 71'	Report	Pen: Butler (3) 22', 31', 57'

The Sportsground, Galway
Attendance: 7,240
Referee: Chris Busby (Ireland)

1 January 2024
15:00

(1 BP) Ospreys (Wales)	27–21	(Wales) Cardiff (1 BP)
Try: Giles (2) 7', 76'; Penaltry try Morse; Con: Edwards 59'; Pen: Edwards 63'	Report	Try: Lane 15'; Grady 19'; Con: De Beer 20'; Pen: De Beer (3) 26', 33', 52'

Brewery Field, Bridgend (Note: On 10 November 2023, due to a clash of fixtures between the Ospreys and Swansea City, the Ospreys moved their fixture from the Swansea.com Stadium to Bridgend's Brewery Field.)
Attendance: 8,159
Referee: Adam Jones (Wales)

1 January 2024
17:15

Dragons (Wales)	13–12	(Wales) Scarlets (1 BP)
Try: Wainwright 35'; Con: Evans 36'; Pen: Evans (2) 4', 48'	Report	Try: Rogers 20'; Lloyd 68'; Con: Costelow 21'

Rodney Parade, Newport
Attendance: 7,617
Referee: Craig Evans (Wales)

1 January 2024
17:15

(1 BP) Leinster (Ireland)	21–22	(Ireland) Ulster
Try: Healy 11'; Russell 23'; Sheehan 62'; Con: Prendergast (2) 12', 24'; H. Byrne 63'	Report	Try: Timoney (2) 4', 35'; Stockdale 7'; Con: Cooney (2) 5', 37'; Pen: Cooney 55'

RDS Arena, Dublin
Attendance: 16,248
Referee: Frank Murphy (Ireland)

27 January 2024
17:00

Bulls (South Africa)	30–28	(South Africa) Lions (1 BP)
Try: Van der Merwe 24'; Papier 41'; Gumede 58'; Con: Goosen (3/3) 25', 42', 58'; Pen: Goosen (3/3) 12', 37', 78'	Report	Try: Louw (2) 4', 17'; Naudé 62'; Con: Nohamba (2/3) 18', 63'; Pen: Nohamba (1/2) 48'; Hendrikse (1/2) 73'; Drop: Nohamba (1/1) 44'

Loftus Versfeld Stadium, Pretoria
Attendance: 26,632
Referee: AJ Jacobs (South Africa)

=== Round 10 ===
16 February 2024
19:35

Scarlets (Wales)	7–42	(Ireland) Munster (1 BP)
Try: Roberts 49'; Con: Titcombe 50'	Report	Try: Coombes (2) 10', 23'; O'Sullivan 62'; Ahern 65'; O'Brien 72'; McCarthy 76'; Con: Carbery (6) 11', 24', 62', 66', 73', 77'

Parc y Scarlets, Llanelli
Attendance: 7,037
Referee: Ian Kenny (Scotland)

16 February 2024
20:35

Zebre Parma (Italy)	19–24	(Scotland) Edinburgh
Try: García 2'; Con: Montemauri 3'; Pen: Montemauri (4) 26', 42', 58', 80'	Report	Try: Venter 45'; Penaltry try 68'; Cherry 73'; Con: Healy (2) 46', 74'; Pen: Healy 32'

Stadio Sergio Lanfranchi, Parma
Attendance: 2,000
Referee: Ben Whitehouse (Wales)

17 February 2024
15:00

Lions (South Africa)	10–25	(South Africa) Bulls (1 BP)
Try: Q. Horn 71'; Con: Hendrikse 71'; Pen: Nohamba 1'	Report	Try: Moodie 19'; Van der Merwe 51'; Coetzee 67'; Kriel 73'; Con: Goosen 68'; Pen: Goosen 60'

Ellis Park Stadium, Johannesburg
Attendance: 22,375
Referee: AJ Jacobs (South Africa)

17 February 2024
15:00

(1 BP) Leinster (Ireland)	47–18	(Italy) Benetton
Try: Penny (2) 9', 77'; McGrath 13'; Turner 33'; Jenkins 42'; Murphy 64'; Deeny 70'; Con: R. Byrne (4) 9', 15', 34', 44'; Prendergast (2) 71', 78'	Report	Try: Mendy (2) 1', 35'; Con: Umaga 2'; Pen: Umaga (2) 25', 39'

RDS Arena, Dublin
Attendance: 15,259
Referee: Hollie Davidson (Scotland)

17 February 2024
17:05

(1 BP) Sharks (South Africa)	21–25	(South Africa) Stormers
Try: Nche 30'; Venter 57'; Mbonambi 75'; Con: Bosch 30'; Masuku (2) 58', 76'	Report	Try: Dweba 16'; De Wet 22'; Loader 48'; Con: Feinberg-Mngomezulu (2) 23', 49'; Pen: Feinberg-Mngomezulu (2) 32', 70'

Kings Park Stadium, Durban
Attendance: 31,093
Referee: Morné Ferreira (South Africa)

17 February 2024
17:15

(1 BP) Cardiff (Wales)	12–16	(Ireland) Connacht
Try: Thomas 17'; Timani 46'; Con: De Beer 19'	Report	Try: Dooley 61'; Con: Hanrahan 61'; Pen: Hanrahan (3) 4', 42', 66'

Cardiff Arms Park, Cardiff
Attendance: 12,000
Referee: Andrea Piardi (Italy)

17 February 2024
19:35

(1 BP) Glasgow Warriors (Scotland)	40–7	(Wales) Dragons
Try: McKay (2) 0', 36'; McDowall (2) 3', 75'; Afshar 44'; Cordero 69'; Con: Thompson (4) 1', 3', 38', 44'; Weir 76'	Report	Try: Reed 64'; Con: O'Brien 65'

Scotstoun Stadium, Glasgow
Attendance: 7,260
Referee: Andrew Brace (Ireland)

18 February 2024
15:00

Ospreys (Wales)	19–17	(Ireland) Ulster (1 BP)
Try: K. Williams 64'; Con: D. Edwards 66'; Pen: D. Edwards (3) 29', 36', 55'; Drop: D. Edwards 79'	Report	Try: Marcus Rea 33'; Stewart 57'; Con: Doak (2) 34', 59'; Pen: Flannery 75'

Swansea.com Stadium, Swansea
Attendance: 5,093
Referee: Federico Vedovelli (Italy)

=== Round 11 ===
1 March 2024
19:35

Edinburgh (Scotland)	19–15	(Wales) Ospreys (1 BP)
Try: Watson 16'; Con: Healy 18'; Pen: Healy (4) 22', 24', 34', 73'	Report	Try: Parry 46'; Morris 67'; Con: Williams 69'; Pen: Edwards 11'

Edinburgh Rugby Stadium, Edinburgh
Attendance: 7,030
Referee: Chris Busby (Ireland)

1 March 2024
19:35

(1 BP) Munster (Ireland)	45–29	(Italy) Zebre Parma (1 BP)
Try: Quinn (2) 5', 58'; Haley 10'; Snyman 25'; O'Brien 33'; Frisch 39'; Daly 79'; Con: Butler (5) 11', 27', 34', 40', 60'	Report	Try: Hasa 18'; Dominguez 61'; Prisciantelli 68'; De Leeuw 74'; Con: Prisciantelli (3) 19', 68', 75'; Pen: Prisciantelli 22'

Musgrave Park, Cork
Attendance: 8,023
Referee: Adam Jones (Wales)

2 March 2024
15:00

(1 BP) Lions (South Africa)	40–10	(South Africa) Sharks
Try: Nohamba 5'; Pretorius 11'; Horn 20'; Van Vuuren 63'; Cronje 68'; Sirgel 74'; Con: Hendrikse (5) 7', 12', 64', 69', 75'	Report	Try: Keyter 26'; Con: Masuku 27'; Pen: Masuku 2'

Ellis Park Stadium, Johannesburg
Attendance: 5,552
Referee: Aimee Barrett-Theron (South Africa)

2 March 2024
16:00

Benetton (Italy)	9–19	(Scotland) Glasgow Warriors
Pen: Umaga 43', 54', 71'		Try: Matthews 7'; McDowall 35'; Jordan 73'; Con: Thompson 36'; Weir 74'

Stadio Comunale di Monigo, Treviso
Attendance: 5,000
Referee: Eoghan Cross (Ireland)

2 March 2024
17:05

(1 BP) Bulls (South Africa)	40–22	(South Africa) Stormers
Try: Grobbelaar 1', 49'; Moodie 55'; Papier 75'; Con: Goosen (4) 2', 50', 57', 77'; Pen: Goosen (4) 10', 13', 19', 23'	Report	Try: Loader 15'; Roos 32'; Venter 61'; Con: Libbok (2) 33', 62'; Pen: Libbok 41'

Loftus Versfeld Stadium, Pretoria
Attendance: 50,026
Referee: Marius van der Westhuizen (South Africa)

2 March 2024
17:05

(1 BP) Connacht (Ireland)	26–10	(Wales) Scarlets
Try: Blade 5'; De Buitlear 9'; Jansen (2) 22', 57'; Con: Hanrahan (3) 6', 23', 58'	Report	Try: E. Jones 26'; Con: D. Jones 27'; Pen: D. Jones 46'

The Sportsground, Galway
Attendance: 5,241
Referee: Federico Vedovelli (Italy)

2 March 2024
19:35

Cardiff (Wales)	20–33	(Ireland) Leinster (1 BP)
Try: Carre (2) 34', 39'; Summerhill 74'; Con: De Beer 35'; Pen: De Beer 11'	Report	Try: Russell 3'; Deegan 8'; Milne (2) 48', 59'; McKee 68'; Con: R. Byrne (4) 4', 48', 61', 68'

Cardiff Arms Park, Cardiff
Attendance: 7,730
Referee: Mike Adamson (Scotland)

2 March 2024
19:35

(1 BP) Ulster (Ireland)	49–26	(Wales) Dragons (1 BP)
Try: Addison 4'; Lowry (2) 17', 32'; Sheridan 29'; McCann (2) 56', 75'; Timoney 71'; Con: Cooney (7) 5', 19', 30', 33', 57', 73', 75'	Report	Try: Benjamin 11'; Screech 51'; Coghlan 64'; Penaltry try Con: Reed (2) 12', 65'

Ravenhill Stadium, Belfast
Attendance: 12,565
Referee: Ian Kenny (Scotland)

=== Round 12 ===
22 March 2024
19:35

Glasgow Warriors (Scotland)	17–13	(Wales) Cardiff (1 BP)
Try: Williamson 43'; Sordoni 51'; Con: Weir (2) 44', 52'; Pen: Weir 67'	Report	Try: Thomas 31'; Con: De Beer 32'; Pen: De Beer (2) 3', 26'

Scotstoun Stadium, Glasgow
Attendance: 6,849
Referee: Frank Murphy (Ireland)

22 March 2024
19:35

Ospreys (Wales)	17–27	(Ireland) Munster (1 BP)
Try: Giles 33'; Parry 53'; Cuthbert 73'; Con: O. Williams 54'	Report	Try: S. Daly 3'; O'Brien (2) 5', 16'; Snyman 57'; Con: Carbery (2) 4', 18'; Pen: Carbery 63'

Swansea.com Stadium, Swansea
Attendance: 3,897
Referee: Hollie Davidson (Scotland)

23 March 2024
15:00

Sharks (South Africa)	22–12	(Ireland) Ulster
Try: Buthelezi 26'; Keyter 45'; Mbonambi 65'; Con: Masuku 28', 47'; Pen: Masuku 53'	Report	Try: Sheridan 18'; Treadwell 56'; Con: Burns 19'

Kings Park Stadium, Durban
Referee: Ben Whitehouse (Wales)

23 March 2024
15:00

Scarlets (Wales)	16–13	(Italy) Benetton (1 BP)
Try: Swart 80+3'; Con: Costelow 80+6'; Pen: Costelow (3) 2', 51', 55'	Report	Try: Ratave11'; Con: Umaga 13'; Pen: Umaga (2) 4', 19'

Parc y Scarlets, Llanelli
Attendance: 6,482
Referee: Chris Busby (Ireland)

23 March 2024
17:05

(1 BP) Stormers (South Africa)	43–21	(Scotland) Edinburgh
Try: Hartzenberg (3) 9', 17', 48'; Zas (2) 34', 40'; Roos (2) 58', 69'; Con: Libbok (3) 10', 19', 71'; Matthee 41'	Report	Try: Henry 13'; Mata 37'; Harrison 65'; Con: Healy (3) 14', 38', 67'

Cape Town Stadium, Cape Town
Attendance: 15,000
Referee: Adam Jones (Wales)

23 March 2024
17:15

Connacht (Ireland)	14–38	(South Africa) Lions (1 BP)
Try: Prendergast 16'; Hanrahan 55'; Con: Hanrahan 16', 55'	Report	Try: F. Horn (2) 6', 78'; Pretorius 25'; Van der Merwe 48'; Cronje 62'; Van den Berg 69'; Con: Hendrikse (4) 7', 49', 63', 79'

The Sportsground, Galway
Attendance: 4,500
Referee: Craig Evans (Wales)

23 March 2024
20:35

Zebre Parma (Italy)	7–31	(Ireland) Leinster (1 BP)
Try: Trulla 24'; Con: Prisciantelli 25'	Report	Try: Russell (2) 3', 77'; A. Osborne 29'; McGrath 44'; Penny 49'; Con: R. Byrne (3) 5', 30', 49'

Stadio Sergio Lanfranchi, Parma
Attendance: 3,500
Referee: Morne Ferreira (South Africa)

23 March 2024
19:35

Dragons (Wales)	10–31	(South Africa) Bulls (1 BP)
Try: Baldwin 78'; Con: Baldwin 78'; Pen: Evans 20'	Report	Try: Arendse 27'; Gumede 44'; Papier 75'; Grobbelaar 80+1'; Con: Smith (4) 29', 45', 76', 80+2'; Pen: Smith 16'

Rodney Parade, Newport
Attendance: 4,697
Referee: Eoghan Cross (Ireland)

=== Round 13 ===
29 March 2024
19:35

Dragons (Wales)	20–13	(Italy) Zebre Parma (1 BP)
Try: Owen 17'; Rosser 23'; Dee 42'; Con: Evans 43'; Pen: Evans 40'	Report	Try: Hasa 74'; Con: Eden 74'; Pen: Eden (2) 32', 38'

Rodney Parade, Newport
Attendance: 4,726
Referee: Mike Adamson (Scotland)

29 March 2024
19:35

(1 BP) Leinster (Ireland)	47–14	(South Africa) Bulls
Try: Van der Flier 18'; Kelleher 28'; Lowe 44'; Milne 46'; Sheehan 63'; Conan 67'; Turner 74'; Con: H. Byrne (3) 19', 45', 48'; R. Byrne (3) 65', 69', 76'	Report	Try: Arendse 34'; Pen: Goosen (3) 8', 14', 40'

RDS Arena, Dublin
Attendance: 16,982
Referee: Craig Evans (Wales)

30 March 2024
14:00

Benetton (Italy)	18–14	(Ireland) Connacht (1 BP)
Try: Mendy 6'; Izekor 79'; Con: Umaga 7'; Pen: Umaga (2) 15', 68'	Report	Try: N. Murray 32'; Prendergast 73'; Con: Carty (2) 33', 74'

Stadio Comunale di Monigo, Treviso
Attendance: 5,000
Referee: Morné Ferreira (South Africa)

30 March 2024
15:00

Sharks (South Africa)	23–13	(Scotland) Edinburgh
Try: Fassi 21'; Am48'; Buthelezi 76'; Con: Masuku 22'; Pen: Masuku (2) 60', 67'	Report	Try: Venter 80'; Con: Healy 80+1'; Pen: Healy (2) 37', 56'

Kings Park Stadium, Durban
Referee: Eoghan Cross (Ireland)

30 March 2024
15:05

(1 BP) Ospreys (Wales)	36–21	(South Africa) Lions
Try: Botha 4'; Parry 16'; M. Morris 49'; Lloyd 57'; K. Williams 79'; Con: O. Williams (3) 17', 50', 58'; Walsh 80'; Pen: O. Williams 41'	Report	Try: Botha 37'; Q. Horn 66'; Kriel 74'; Con: Hendrikse (3) 38', 66', 74'

Swansea.com Stadium, Swansea
Attendance: 4,264
Referee: Andrew Brace (Ireland)

30 March 2024
19:15

Stormers (South Africa)	13–7	(Ireland) Ulster (1 BP)
Try: Roos 73'; Con: Libbok 74'; Pen: Libbok (2) 58', 80+1'	Report	Try: Timoney 7'; Con: Cooney 8'

Cape Town Stadium, Cape Town
Attendance: 24,602
Referee: Sam Grove-White (Scotland)

30 March 2024
19:35

Munster (Ireland)	20–15	(Wales) Cardiff (1 BP)
Try: Beirne 48'; Crowley 63'; Con: Crowley (2) 49', 65'; Pen: Crowley (2) 38', 74'	Report	Try: Thomas 54'; Young 59'; Con: De Beer 55'; Pen: Beetham 78'

Thomond Park, Limerick
Attendance: 15,423
Referee: Andrea Piardi (Italy)

30 March 2024
19:35

Scarlets (Wales)	3–45	(Scotland) Glasgow Warriors (1 BP)
Pen: Lloyd 16'	Report	Try: Rowe (3) 6', 68', 80+1'; Hiddleston 25'; Cummings 40'; Matthews 62'; Con: Weir (4) 7', 26', 41', 63'

Parc y Scarlets, Llanelli
Attendance: 6,499
Referee: Gianluca Gnecchi (Italy)

=== Round 14 ===
19 April 2024
19:35

Ulster (Ireland)	19–17	(Wales) Cardiff (1 BP)
Try: McCann; Con: Cooney; Pen: Doak (2) 27', 35'; Cooney (2) 65', 79'	Report	Try: Cabango (2) 11', 42'; Con: De Beer (2) 12', 43'; Pen: De Beer 71'

Ravenhill Stadium, Belfast
Attendance: 13,679
Referee: Mike Adamson (Scotland)

19 April 2024
19:35

Glasgow Warriors (Scotland)	21–10	(South Africa) Sharks
Try: Horne 11'; Williamson 29'; Steyn 43'; Con: Horne (3) 11', 30', 44'	Report	Try: Jooste 36'; Mchunu 53'

Scotstoun Stadium, Glasgow
Attendance: 7,216
Referee: Federico Vedovelli (Italy)

20 April 2024
15:00

(1 BP) Lions (South Africa)	44–12	(Ireland) Leinster
Try: Van den Berg 0'; Louw 10'; Q. Horn 13'; Tshituka (2) 56', 75'; Horn 80'; Con: Nohamba (2) 1', 14'; Hendrikse (2) 77', 80+1'; Pen: Nohamba (2) 6', 48'	Report	Try: Frawley (2) 52', 62'; Con: H. Byrne 53'

Ellis Park Stadium, Johannesburg
Attendance: 6,011
Referee: Gianluca Gnecchi (Italy)

20 April 2024
15:00

(1 BP) Benetton (Italy)	36–19	(Wales) Dragons
Try: Smith 7'; Lucchesi 30'; Uren 35'; Ratave 44'; Iachizzi 70'; Lamaro 74'; Con: Albornoz (2) 7', 36'; Umaga 75'	Report	Try: J. Rosser 42'; Blacker 52'; Hope 77'; Con: Evans 42'; Reed 77'

Stadio Comunale di Monigo, Treviso
Attendance: 4,865
Referee: Frank Murphy (Ireland)

20 April 2024
17:05

(1 BP) Bulls (South Africa)	22–27	(Ireland) Munster (1 BP)
Try: E. Louw 25'; Arendse 44'; Grobbelaar 49'; Con: Goosen (2) 26', 50'; Pen: Goosen 29'	Report	Try: S. Daly 18'; Snyman 36'; Hodnett 57'; Murray 73'; Con: Crowley (2) 20', 37'; Pen: Crowley 41'

Loftus Versfeld Stadium, Pretoria
Attendance: 12,975
Referee: Adam Jones (Wales)

20 April 2024
19:15

(1 BP) Stormers (South Africa)	21–27	(Wales) Ospreys (1 BP)
Try: D. du Plessis 13'; Roos 43'; Penaltry try 80+2'; Con: Libbok (2) 14', 45'	Report	Try: L. Morgan (2) 8', 39'; Parry 25'; Deaves 63'; Con: Walsh (2) 41', 64'; Pen: Walsh 79'

Cape Town Stadium, Cape Town
Attendance: 15,829
Referee: Andrew Brace (Ireland)

20 April 2024
19:35

(1 BP) Connacht (Ireland)	54–16	(Italy) Zebre Parma
Try: Devine (2) 15', 23'; N. Murray 35'; Farrell 46'; O'Brien 52'; Aki 68'; Hanrahan 73'; Penaltry try 76'; Con: Hanrahan (6) 16', 24', 26', 46', 69', 74'	Report	Try: Trulla 20'; Lucchin 64'; Pen: Gesi 30'; Drop: Prisciantelli 13'

The Sportsground, Galway
Attendance: 4,756
Referee: Aimee Barrett-Theron (South Africa)

20 April 2024
19:35

(1 BP) Edinburgh (Scotland)	43–18	(Wales) Scarlets
Try: Goosen 17'; Van der Merwe 43'; Currie 60'; Schoeman 66'; Bennett 71'; Mata 76'; Con: Healy (5) 17', 44', 61', 67', 72'; Pen: Healy 53'	Report	Try: Rogers 5'; G. Davies 27'; Con: Costelow 6'; Pen: Costelow (2) 21', 56'

Edinburgh Rugby Stadium, Edinburgh
Attendance: 6,887
Referee: Eoghan Cross (Ireland)

=== Round 15 ===
26 April 2024
19:35

Scarlets (Wales)	27–32	(South Africa) Sharks (1 BP)
Try: Elias 18'; Mathias 51'; Nicholas 76'; Con: Costelow (3) 19', 52', 76'; Pen: Costelow (2) 2', 10'	Report	Try: Kok (3) 4', 55', 73'; Koch 37'; Con: Musuku (3) 6', 38', 57'; Pen: Musuku (2) 13', 45'

Parc y Scarlets, Llanelli
Attendance: 6,820
Referee: Mike Adamson (Scotland)

26 April 2024
19:35

(1 BP) Ulster (Ireland)	38–34	(Italy) Benetton (2 BP)
Try: Stewart 15'; Crothers 32'; Stockdale 39'; Addison 49'; Izuchukwu 66'; Con: Cooney (5) 16', 33', 40', 51', 67'; Pen: Cooney 73'	Report	Try: Menoncello 5'; Umaga 46'; Halafihi 56'; Nemer 62'; Albornoz 80'; Con: Albornoz (3) 57', 64', 80+1'; Pen: Umaga 24'

Ravenhill Stadium, Belfast
Referee: Sam Grove-White (Scotland)

27 April 2024
14:00

Zebre (Italy)	9–40	(Scotland) Glasgow Warriors (1 BP)
Pen: Dominguez (3) 6', 25', 43'	Report	Try: Hiddleston (2) 31', 41'; Steyn (2) 50', 66'; Dobie 74'; Horne 78'; Con: Thompson (5) 32', 42', 51', 76', 79'

Stadio Sergio Lanfranchi, Parma
Attendance: 2,500
Referee: Eoghan Cross (Ireland)

27 April 2024
15:00

(1 BP) Bulls (South Africa)	61–24	(Wales) Ospreys
Try: Grobbelaar 7'; Kriel 21'; Arendse (2) 29', 54'; Moodie (2) 38', 41'; Papier 44'; Penaltry try 61'; Le Roux 76'; Con: C. Smith (6) 8', 22', 39', 43', 46', 55'; Van der Walt 77'	Report	Try: L. Davies 26'; K. Williams 48'; Giles 67'; Con: Walsh (3) 27', 49', 68'; Pen: Walsh 34'

Loftus Versfeld Stadium, Pretoria
Attendance: 8,387
Referee: Andrew Brace (Ireland)

27 April 2024
15:05

Cardiff (Wales)	7–24	(Scotland) Edinburgh
Try: Carré 43'; Con: De Beer 44'	Report	Try: Schoeman 26'; Ashman 61'; Venter 76'; Con: Healy (3) 27', 62', 76'; Pen: Healy 71'

Cardiff Arms Park, Cardiff
Attendance: 11,218
Referee: Frank Murphy (Ireland)

27 April 2024
17:00

Lions (South Africa)	13–33	(Ireland) Munster (1 BP)
Try: Botha 61'; Con: Hendrikse 62'; Pen: Hendrikse (2) 27', 37'	Report	Try: O'Donoghue 33; Penaltry try 42'; S. Daly 48'; G. Coombes 78'; Con: Crowley 35'; Pen: Crowley (3) 4', 8', 19'

Ellis Park Stadium, Johannesburg
Attendance: 6,990
Referee: Craig Evans (Wales)

27 April 2024
19:05

(1 BP) Stormers (South Africa)	42–12	(Ireland) Leinster
Try: Loader 3'; Jantjies 41'; Moerat 43'; Engelbrecht 69'; Gelant 78'; Con: Libbok (4) 5', 41', 42', 70'; Pen: Libbok (3) 18', 30', 28'	Report	Try: Deegan 50'; Russell 52'; Con: Prendergast 51'

Cape Town Stadium, Cape Town
Attendance: 23,630
Referee: Andrea Piardi (Italy)

27 April 2024
20:00

(1 BP) Dragons (Wales)	27–34	(Ireland) Connacht (1 BP)
Try: Hughes 5'; R. Williams 42'; Dyer 53'; Con: Evans (3) 6', 43', 55'; Pen: Evans (2) 49', 62'	Report	Try: Hurley-Langton 2'; Bealham 19'; Porch 25'; Heffernan 44'; Tierney-Martin 70'; Con: Hanrahan (2) 3', 20'; Forde 71'; Pen: Hanrahan 58'

Rodney Parade, Newport
Attendance: 4,212
Referee: Federico Vedovelli (Italy)

=== Round 16 ===
10 May 2024
19:35

Dragons (Wales)	21–44	(South Africa) Stormers (1 BP)
Try: Keddie 13'; Wainwright 59'; Con: O'Brien 60'; Pen: Reed 7', 26', 49'	Report	Try: Davids (2) 34', 65'; Roos 72'; Feinberg-Mngomezulu (2) 75', 79'; Con: Libbok (5) 35', 67', 74', 76', 80+1'; Pen: Libbok (3) 31', 46', 57'

Rodney Parade, Newport
Attendance: 5,121
Referee: Chris Busby (Ireland)

10 May 2024
19:35

(1 BP) Edinburgh (Scotland)	40–14	(Italy) Zebre Parma
Try: Ashman (2) 16', 30'; Nel 37'; Dean 65'; Vellacott 76'; Sebastian 80+1'; Con: Healy (3) 32', 37', 66'; Scott (2) 77', 80+2'	Report	Try: Prisciantelli 23'; Trulla 56'; Con: Dominguez 23'; Montemauri 57'

Edinburgh Rugby Stadium, Edinburgh
Attendance: 6,792
Referee: Ben Breakspear (Wales)

11 May 2024
14:00

(1 BP) Bulls (South Africa)	40–34	(Scotland) Glasgow Warriors (2 BP)
Try: Van der Merwe 14'; Hanekom 23'; Louw 37'; Moodie 45'; Con: Smith (4) 16', 24', 38', 46'; Pen: Smith (4) 33', 57', 61', 77'	Report	Try: Fagerson 6'; Steyn 63'; Cancelliere 68'; Weir 71'; Con: Horne 7'; Jordan 64'; Weir (2) 68', 71'; Pen: Horne 29'; Weir 80'

Loftus Versfeld Stadium, Pretoria
Attendance: 10,006
Referee: Ben Whitehouse (Wales)

11 May 2024
16:05

(2 BP) Sharks (South Africa)	24–25	(Italy) Benetton
Try: Fassi 13'; Nché 23'; Kok (2) 47', 56'; Con: Masuku (2) 15', 49'	Report	Try: Menoncello 35'; Lucchesi 44'; Umaga 77'; Con: Marin 45'; Umaga 78'; Pen: Marin 3'; Umaga 71'

Kings Park Stadium, Durban
Referee: Mike Adamson (Scotland)

11 May 2024
15:05

Scarlets (Wales)	20–31	(Ireland) Ulster (1 BP)
Try: Tuipulotu 60'; Lewis 66'; Con: Costelow (2) 61', 67'; Pen: Costelow (2) 10', 26'	Report	Try: McCloskey 42'; Timoney 47'; McCann 54'; Stockdale 63'; Con: Cooney (4) 43', 49', 55', 65'; Pen: Cooney 27'

Parc y Scarlets, Llanelli
Attendance: 6,881
Referee: Gianluca Gnecchi (Italy)

11 May 2024
18:15

(1 BP) Lions (South Africa)	34–13	(Wales) Cardiff
Try: Venter 7'; Horn 17'; Tshituka (2) 73', 78'; Con: Nohamba (2) 8', 19'; Lombard (2) 74', 79'; Pen: Nohamba (2) 30', 42'	Report	Try: Domachowski 47'; Con: De Beer 48'; Pen: De Beer (2) 22', 59'

Ellis Park Stadium, Johannesburg
Attendance: 4,978
Referee: Eoghan Cross (Ireland)

11 May 2024
17:15

(1 BP) Munster (Ireland)	47–12	(Ireland) Connacht
Try: Snyman 19'; Nash 26'; Nankivell 45'; Murray 62'; Carbery 69'; Ahern 72'; Daly 79'; Con: Crowley (3) 19', 29', 46'; Carbery (3) 62', 70', 80'	Report	Try: Ralston (2) 38', 64'; Con: Carty 39'

Thomond Park, Limerick
Attendance: 20,183
Referee: Adam Jones (Wales)

11 May 2024
19:35

(1 BP) Leinster (Ireland)	61–14	(Wales) Ospreys
Try: J. O'Brien 2'; Molony 10'; Larmour (3) 27', 54', 76'; Jenkins 40'; Osborne 69'; Ngatai 73'; T. O'Brien 79'; Con: R. Byrne (5) 3', 11', 28', 42', 55'; Frawley (3) 70', 74', 80'	Report	Try: Watkin 13'; Penalty try 18'; Con: Edwards 14'

RDS Arena, Dublin
Attendance: 15,750
Referee: Sam Grove-White (Scotland)

=== Round 17 ===
17 May 2024
20:35

Zebre Parma (Italy)	18–32	(Wales) Scarlets (1 BP)
Try: Licata 3'; Hasa 51'; Con: Montemauri 4'; Pen: Montemauri (2) 24', 28'	Report	Try: Elias 14'; G. Davies (2) 20', 31'; Lewis 42'; Con: Lloyd (3) 21', 32', 43'; Pen: Costelow (2) 68', 72'

Stadio Sergio Lanfranchi, Parma
Attendance: 2,500
Referee: Sam Grove-White (Scotland)

17 May 2024
19:35

(1 BP) Edinburgh (Scotland)	26–29	(Ireland) Munster (1 BP)
Try: Bennett 24'; Venter 66'; Con: Healy (2) 25', 66'; Pen: Healy (4) 6', 12', 22', 49'	Report	Try: Frisch (2) 17', 35'; Crowley 42'; Coombes 53'; Con: Crowley (3) 36', 43', 54'; Pen: Crowley 69'

Edinburgh Rugby Stadium, Edinburgh
Attendance: 7,774
Referee: Gianluca Gnecchi (Italy)

18 May 2024
14:00

(1 BP) Bulls (South Africa)	56–35	(Italy) Benetton (1 BP)
Try: Moodie (3) 2', 35', 56'; Kriel (2) 17', 53'; Arendse 19'; Nortjé 24'; Van der Merwe 49'; Grobbelaar 79'; Con: Goosen (4) 3', 17', 25', 54'; Pen: Smith 72'	Report	Try: Ratave 30'; Lucchesi 39'; Uren 45'; Halafihi 63'; Zanon 75'; Con: Smith (5) 31', 40', 46', 65', 76'

Loftus Versfeld Stadium, Pretoria
Referee: Hollie Davidson (Scotland)

18 May 2024
15:00

(1 BP) Ospreys (Wales)	26–13	(Wales) Dragons
Try: Lake (2) 36', 42'; Morgan-Williams 40'; Williams 58'; Con: Edwards (3) 37', 42', 59'	Report	Try: Reed 53'; Con: Reed 53'; Pen: Reed (2) 4', 17'

Swansea.com Stadium, Swansea
Attendance: 5,128
Referee: Ben Breakspear (Wales)

18 May 2024
16:05

(1 BP) Lions (South Africa)	44–21	(Scotland) Glasgow Warriors
Try: Maxwane (2) 33', 53'; Van der Merwe 51'; Pretorius 57'; Nohamba 61'; Sirgel 78'; Con: Nohamba (4) 52', 55', 58', 63'; Pen: Hendrikse 25'; Nohamba 74'	Report	Try: Rowe 12'; Ferrie 46'; McKay 68'; Con: Horne (2) 13', 47'; Weir 68'

Ellis Park Stadium, Johannesburg
Attendance: 6,672
Referee: Craig Evans (Wales)

18 May 2024
17:05

(1 BP) Connacht (Ireland)	12–16	(South Africa) Stormers
Try: Blade 30'; Aungier 59'; Con: Carty 31'	Report	Try: Davids 50'; Con: Libbok 51'; Pen: Libbok (3) 22', 68', 72'

The Sportsground, Galway
Attendance: 4,889
Referee: Federico Vedovelli (Italy)

18 May 2024
18:15

Sharks (South Africa)	14–36	(Wales) Cardiff (1 BP)
Try: Appollis 24'; Bosch 77'; Con: Cronjé 25'; Bosch 77'	Report	Try: Lawrence 14'; Donnell 20'; Halaholo 28'; Botham 33'; Grady 72'; Con: Thomas (4) 15', 21', 29', 73'; Pen: Thomas 44'

Kings Park Stadium, Durban
Attendance: 9,752
Referee: Frank Murphy (Ireland)

18 May 2024
19:35

Ulster (Ireland)	23–21	(Ireland) Leinster (1 BP)
Try: Herring 13'; Stockdale 57'; Con: Cooney (2) 14', 58'; Pen: Cooney (3) 32', 43', 78'	Report	Try: Ngatai 22'; Foley 26'; Alaalatoa 52'; Con: H. Byrne (3) 23', 29', 54'

Ravenhill Stadium, Belfast
Attendance: 15,976
Referee: Andrea Piardi (Italy)

=== Round 18 ===
31 May 2024
19:35

(1 BP) Glasgow Warriors (Scotland)	38–26	(Italy) Zebre Parma
Try: Bhatti 2'; Matthews (2) 31', 65'; Rowe 47'; Cancelliere 58'; Jordan 79'; Con: Weir 3'; Horne (3) 59', 65', 80'	Report	Try: Montemauri 40'; Stavile 49'; Con: Montemauri (2) 42', 50'; Pen: Montemauri (3) 12', 23', 62'; Trulla 38'

Scotstoun Stadium, Glasgow
Attendance: 7,246
Referee: Peter Martin (Ireland)

31 May 2024
19:35

(1 BP) Leinster (Ireland)	33–7	(Ireland) Connacht
Try: Conan 7'; J. O'Brien (2) 16', 73'; Frawley 22'; Sheehan 62'; Con: Prendergast (4) 8', 16', 22', 74'	Report	Try: Reilly 64'; Con: Tom Daly (rugby union) 64'

RDS Arena, Dublin
Attendance: 17,225
Referee: Chris Busby (Ireland)

1 June 2024
13:00

(1 BP) Benetton (Italy)	31–6	(Scotland) Edinburgh
Try: Mendy 6'; Ratave 33'; Albornoz 58'; Izekor (2) 62', 66'; Con: Smith (3) 35', 60', 63'	Report	Pen: Healy (2) 24', 27'

Stadio Comunale di Monigo, Treviso
Attendance: 5,000
Referee: Ben Whitehouse (Wales)

1 June 2024
14:00

(1 BP) Stormers (South Africa)	29–24	(South Africa) Lions (1 BP)
Try: Venter 6'; Davids 23'; Roos 53'; Smith 76'; Con: Libbok (3) 8', 54', 77'; Pen: Libbok 42'	Report	Try: F. Horn 18'; Pretorius 31'; Con: Hendrikse 32'; Pen: Hendrikse (4) 2', 10', 39', 73'

Cape Town Stadium, Cape Town
Attendance: 35,202
Referee: Marius van der Westhuizen (South Africa)

1 June 2024
15:00

(1 BP) Scarlets (Wales)	32–15	(Wales) Dragons
Try: Mathias 28'; Davies 37'; Lewis (2) 43', 53'; Con: Costelow (2) 29', 44'; Lloyd 39'; Pen: Costelow (2) 14', 73'	Report	Try: Tomkinson (2) 57', 68'; Con: Reed 69'; Pen: Reed 8'

Cardiff City Stadium
Attendance: 20,167
Referee: Craig Evans (Wales)

1 June 2024
16:05

Sharks (South Africa)	14–26	(South Africa) Bulls (1 BP)
Try: Masuku 15'; Richardson 67'; Con: Masuku (2) 16', 68'	Report	Try: Kriel 21'; Grobbelaar 29'; Van der Merwe (2) 55', 76'; Con: Goosen (2) 30', 56'; Smith 78'

Kings Park Stadium, Durban
Referee: Morné Ferreira (South Africa)

1 June 2024
17:15

(2 BP) Cardiff (Wales)	29–33	(Wales) Ospreys (1 BP)
Try: Cabango 8'; Grady (2) 39', 80'; Hamer-Webb 68'; Con: de Beer 8'; Thomas (2) 69', 80+1'; Pen: Thomas 53'	Report	Try: Smith (2) 6', 48'; Tipuric 29'; Morgan 63'; Penalty try 76'; Con: Edwards (3) 7', 48', 64'

Cardiff City Stadium
Attendance: 20,167
Referee: Adam Jones (Wales)

1 June 2024
17:15

(1 BP) Munster (Ireland)	29–24	(Ireland) Ulster (1 BP)
Try: Snyman 7'; Nash 51'; Daly 58'; Clarke 69'; Con: Crowley (3) 9', 53', 59'; Pen: Crowley 77'	Report	Try: Herring 16'; McCann 40+3'; Rea 54'; Con: Cooney (3) 18', 40+4', 55'; Pen: Cooney 22'

Thomond Park, Limerick
Attendance: 17,496
Referee: Frank Murphy (Ireland)

== Knockout stage ==
For the first time, all five participating nations are represented in the URC play-offs, following a set of results on the final day that elevated Ospreys three places in the table to take the last available berth.

=== Bracket ===
Quarter-finals
2	(South Africa) Bulls	30
7	(Italy) Benetton	23
3	(Ireland) Leinster	43
6	(Ireland) Ulster	20
1	(Ireland) Munster	23
8	(Wales) Ospreys	7
4	(Scotland) Glasgow Warriors	27
5	(South Africa) Stormers	10

Semi-finals
2	(South Africa) Bulls	25
3	(Ireland) Leinster	20
1	(Ireland) Munster	10
4	(Scotland) Glasgow Warriors	17

Final
2	(South Africa) Bulls	16
4	(Scotland) Glasgow Warriors	21

The play-off draw is seeded based on final positions in the regular season league table.

The higher-ranked teams have home advantage in the quarter-finals, semi-finals and final.

=== Quarter-finals ===
7 June 2024
19:35

(1) Munster (Ireland)	23–7	(Wales) Ospreys (8)
Try: Zebo 1'; Scannell 17'; Con: Crowley (2) 2', 18'; Pen: Crowley (3) 27', 58', 61'	Report	Try: Giles 4'; Con: O. Williams 5'

Thomond Park, Limerick
Attendance: 14,072
Referee: Hollie Davidson (Scotland)

8 June 2024
14:30

(2) Bulls (South Africa)	30−23	(Italy) Benetton (7)
Try: Arendse (2) 1', 20'; Kriel 61'; Con: Goosen (3) 1', 21', 62'; Pen: Goosen (3) 35', 50', 74'	Report	Try: Ratave 31'; Albornoz 57'; Fekitoa 66'; Con: Smith 59'; Pen: Smith 10', 41'

Loftus Versfeld Stadium, Pretoria
Attendance: 19,243
Referee: Mike Adamson (Scotland)

8 June 2024
17:00

(3) Leinster (Ireland)	43–20	(Ireland) Ulster (6)
Try: Henshaw 20'; Lowe (2) 33', 45'; Larmour 62'; Van der Flier 67'; Molony 75'; Con: R. Byrne (4) 21', 34', 63', 68'; Prendergast 76'; Pen: R. Byrne 30'	Report	Try: McCann 49'; Moore 64'; Lowry 79'; Con: Cooney 65'; Pen: Cooney 42'

Aviva Stadium, Dublin
Attendance: 18,174
Referee: Andrew Brace (Ireland)

8 June 2024
19:35

(4) Glasgow Warriors (Scotland)	27–10	(South Africa) Stormers (5)
Try: Cancelliere 61'; Venter 74'; Thompson 80'; Con: Horne (3) 62', 75', 80'; Pen: Horne (2) 19', 29'	Report	Try: Loader 58'; De Wet 65'

Scotstoun Stadium, Glasgow
Attendance: 5,879
Referee: Chris Busby (Ireland)

=== Semi-finals ===
15 June 2024
16:00

(2) Bulls (South Africa)	25–20	(Ireland) Leinster (3)
Try: Goosen 29'; Petersen (2) 41', 66'; Con: Goosen (2) 31', 42'; Pen: Goosen (2) 41', 61'	Report	Try: Lowe 23'; Doris 50'; Con: R. Byrne (2) 24', 50'; Pen: R. Byrne (2) 58', 64'

Loftus Versfeld Stadium, Pretoria
Attendance: 31,578
Referee: Sam Grove-White (Scotland)

15 June 2024
18:00

(1) Munster (Ireland)	10–17	(Scotland) Glasgow Warriors (4)
Try: Frisch 55'; Con: Crowley 56'; Pen: Crowley 11'	Report	Try: Steyn 23'; Cancelliere 50'; Con: Horne (2) 24', 51'; Pen: Horne 74'

Thomond Park, Limerick
Attendance: 20,052
Referee: Andrea Piardi (Italy)

=== Final ===
The 2024 United Rugby Championship Final was held in South Africa for the third time in succession. The final was the second appearance of the Bulls following their defeat in 2022, and the first appearance of Glasgow Warriors who became the first Scottish team, and indeed the first team outside of South Africa and Ireland, to reach the final since the competition adopted its current format. It was also Glasgow's fourth final appearance overall in the various forms of the competition. For the third year in succession, the top-seeded team entering the playoffs failed to reach the final.

22 June 2024
5pm

(2) Bulls (South Africa)	16–21	(Scotland) Glasgow Warriors (4)
Try: van Staden 24'; Con: Goosen 25'; Pen: Goosen (3) 1', 14', 51'		Try: Cummings 40' + 1'; Turner 53'; Jones 62'; Con: Horne (3) 40' + 2', 54', 64'

Loftus Versfeld Stadium, Pretoria
Attendance: 50,388
Referee: Andrea Piardi (Italy)

== Leading scorers ==
Note: Flags to the left of player names indicate national team as has been defined under World Rugby eligibility rules, or primary nationality for players who have not yet earned international senior caps. Players may hold one or more non-WR nationalities.

=== Most points ===
Rank	Player	Club	Points
1	(Scotland) Ben Healy	Edinburgh	175
2	(South Africa) Johan Goosen	Bulls	167
3	(South Africa) Tinus de Beer	Cardiff	118
4	(South Africa) Sanele Nohamba	Lions	117
5	(Ireland) Jack Crowley	Munster	115
5	(England) Jacob Umaga	Benetton	115
7	(Ireland) JJ Hanrahan	Connacht	111
7	(South Africa) Manie Libbok	Stormers	111
9	(Ireland) John Cooney	Ulster	109
10	(Scotland) George Horne	Glasgow Warriors	89

=== Most tries ===
Rank	Player	Club	Tries
1	(Scotland) Johnny Matthews	Glasgow	14
2	(South Africa) Akker van der Merwe	Bulls	12
3	(South Africa) David Kriel	Bulls	11
4	(South Africa) Kurt-Lee Arendse	Bulls	10
5	(South Africa) Werner Kok	Sharks	9
5	(South Africa) Canan Moodie	Bulls	9
5	(Scotland) Kyle Rowe	Glasgow Warriors	9
5	(Ireland) Jacob Stockdale	Ulster	9
9	(Wales) Mason Grady	Cardiff	8
9	(South Africa) Johan Grobbelaar	Bulls	8
9	(South Africa) Francke Horn	Lions	8
9	(South Africa) Evan Roos	Stormers	8
9	(Ireland) Tom Stewart	Ulster	8
9	(Wales) Keiran Williams	Ospreys	8

== End of Season Awards ==
=== URC Elite XV ===
The 2023–24 United Rugby Championship Elite XV is:

Pos		Player	Team
FB	15	(South Africa) Warrick Gelant	(South Africa) Stormers
RW	14	(Ireland) Jordan Larmour	(Ireland) Leinster
OC	13	(Scotland) Sione Tuipulotu	(Scotland) Glasgow
IC	12	(New Zealand) Alex Nankivell	(Ireland) Munster
LW	11	(South Africa) Kurt-Lee Arendse	(South Africa) Bulls
FH	10	(Ireland) Jack Crowley	(Ireland) Munster
SH	9	(Ireland) John Cooney	(Ireland) Ulster
N8	8	(South Africa) Cameron Hanekom	(South Africa) Bulls
OF	7	(South Africa) Elrigh Louw	(South Africa) Bulls
BF	6	(Scotland) Jamie Ritchie	(Scotland) Edinburgh
RL	5	(South Africa) Ruan Nortjé	(South Africa) Bulls
TP	4	(Ireland) Tadhg Beirne	(Ireland) Munster
TP	3	(South Africa) Wilco Louw	(South Africa) Bulls
HK	2	(South Africa) Akker van der Merwe	(South Africa) Bulls
LP	1	(South Africa) Ox Nche	(South Africa) Sharks

=== Award winners ===
The 2023–24 URC award winners were:

Award	Winner
Vodacom Player of the Season	(South Africa) Sanele Nohamba (Lions)
Players' Player of the Season	(Ireland) Jack Crowley (Munster)
Next-Gen Player of the Season	(Ireland) Jack Crowley (Munster)
Golden Boot	(South Africa) Chris Smith (Bulls)
Top Try Scorer	(Scotland) Johnny Matthews (Glasgow Warriors)
Try of the Season powered by URC.tv	(South Africa) Aphelele Fassi (Sharks)
Tackle Machine	(Italy) Alessandro Izekor (Benetton)
Turnover King	(Scotland) Jamie Ritchie (Edinburgh)
Ironman Award	(Ireland) Shane Daly (Munster)
BKT Coach of the Season	(England) Graham Rowntree (Munster)
Innovation Award	(Italy) Benetton

== Attendances ==
This season saw a record United Rugby Championship attendance, with a 3% increase in overall attendance for a total of 1.69 million, and an average of 11,200 per game. The highest attendance for a single round was 146,000 for round 9.
