= Will Spencer =

Will Spencer may refer to:

- Will Spencer (The Bold and the Beautiful)
- Will Spencer (rugby union) (born 1992), English rugby union player
