= Derwyn Jones =

Wales international rugby union footballer

- Born: 14 November 1970 (age 55) Carmarthen, Wales
- Height: 208 cm (6 ft 10 in)
- Weight: 121 kg (19 st 1 lb)
- Notable relative: Lewis Jones (son)

Rugby union career
- Position: Lock
Senior career
Years	Team	Apps	(Points)
1993-1999	Cardiff	164	(10)
- Neath
1993-2000	Barbarians	3	(5)
- Northampton
- Bedford
1991-1993	Llanelli	12	(0)
1999-2000	Beziers		
International career
Years	Team	Apps	(Points)
1994-1996	Wales	19	(0)

Derwyn Jones (born 14 November 1970) is a former professional Welsh rugby union player and Welsh international. He is the tallest Welsh player to be capped at 6 ft 10 inches tall, and weighed over 20 stone at his peak.

== Early life ==
Jones was born in Carmarthen, Wales, and studied sports science at Loughborough University.

== Career ==
Jones made his international debut on Saturday, 26 November, 1994, against South Africa in Cardiff aged 24 where Wales lost 20–12. He went on to play in 17 of the next 19 Internationals, earning nineteen caps for Wales. After slapping Kobus Wiese in the face, he was notably knocked unconscious by Wiese at the beginning of a match against South Africa at Ellis Park Stadium in 1995. Wiese was fined ZAR 50,000 and given a three-match ban.

At club level Jones won the SWALEC Cup twice in 1994 and 1997 and also played in the first Heineken Cup final with Cardiff in 1996.

Since retiring from active play, Jones has opened his own agency company, which represents over fifty elite rugby players across Europe.

== Welsh International Record ==
- 1994 v South Africa (Cardiff) L 20-12
- 1995 v France (Paris) L 21-9 (FN)
- 1995 v England (Cardiff) L 23-9 (FN)
- 1995 v Scotland (Murrayfield) L 26-13 (FN)
- 1995 v Japan (Bloemfontein) W 57-10 (World Cup)
- 1995 v New Zealand (Johannesburg) L 34-9 (World Cup)
- 1995 v Ireland (Johannesburg) L 24-23 (World Cup)
- 1995 v South Africa (Johannesburg) L 40-11
- 1995 v Fiji (Cardiff) W 19-15
- 1996 v Italy (Rome) W 31-26
- 1996 v England (Twickenham) L 21-15 (FN)
- 1996 v Scotland (Cardiff) L 16-14 (FN)
- 1996 v Ireland (Dublin) L 30-17 (FN)
- 1996 v France (Cardiff) W 16-15 (FN)
- 1996 v Australia (Brisbane) L 56-25
- 1996 v Australia (Sydney) L 42-3
- 1996 v Barbarians (Cardiff) W 31-10
- 1996 v Italy (Rome) W 31-22
- 1996 v Australia (Cardiff) L 28-19
