= Lewis Jones (rugby union, born 2002) =

Welsh rugby union player

- Full name: Lewis Rhys Jones
- Born: 19 July 2002 (age 24) Warwick, England
- Height: 200 cm (6 ft 7 in)
- Weight: 105 kg (231 lb; 16 st 7 lb)
- Notable relative: Derwyn Jones (father)

Rugby union career
- Position: Lock
- Current team: Ospreys
Senior career
Years	Team	Apps	(Points)
2023–	Ospreys	12	(0)
2024	→ Cheetahs		
2026	→ Worcester Warriors		
- Correct as of 11 December 2025
International career
Years	Team	Apps	(Points)
2022	Wales U20	5	(0)
- Correct as of 11 December 2025

Lewis Jones (born 19 July 2002) is a Welsh rugby union player, who plays for the Ospreys in the United Rugby Championship. His preferred position is lock.

== Early career ==
Jones was born in Warwick, England but grew up in Wales. He played his early club rugby for Cowbridge RFC, where he was coached by his father, former Welsh international Derwyn, and was a member of the Cardiff academy. He represented Wales U20 in 2022.

== Professional career ==
Jones first signed an academy contract with the Ospreys in 2021, before making his professional debut for the Ospreys in round 3 of the 2023–24 United Rugby Championship against the Sharks. Jones signed an extension with the Ospreys during the season.

After making a further three appearances, and being an unused sub in three further games, he signed for the Cheetahs on short-term loan ahead of the 2024 SA Cup. After his return from South Africa, he would make a further 6 appearances across the 2024–25 season, starting the round five fixture against Ulster.

In February 2026, Jones joined Worcester Warriors on a short-term loan. He made his debut on 13 February 2026, against London Scottish.
