= Gianmarco Lucchesi =

Italy international rugby union player

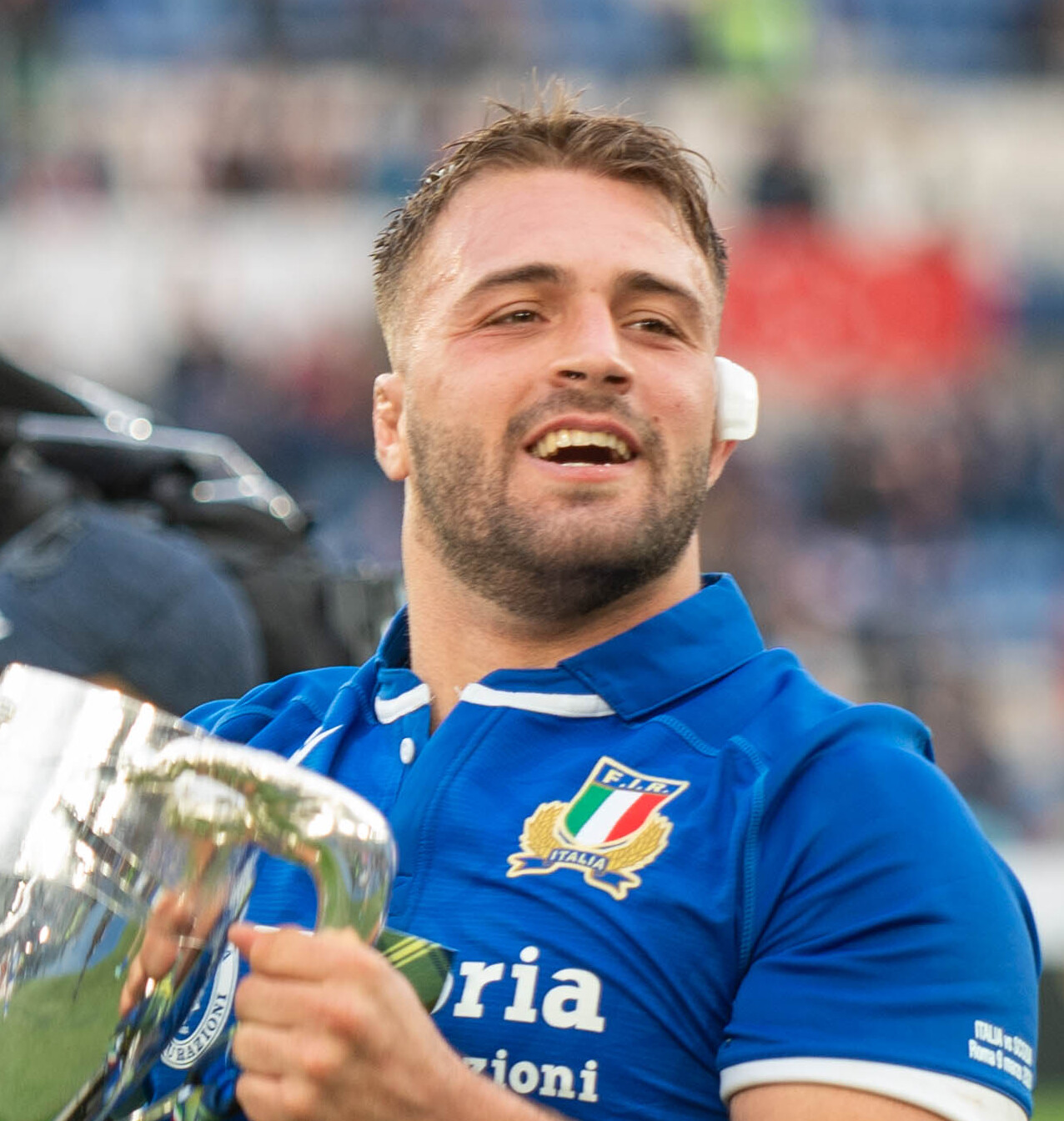
- Lucchesi in March 2024
- Born: 10 September 2000 (age 26) Pisa, Italy
- Height: 184 cm (6 ft 0 in)
- Weight: 110 kg (243 lb; 17 st 5 lb)

Rugby union career
- Position: Hooker
- Current team: Toulon
Youth career
- Lions Amaranto Livorno
Senior career
Years	Team	Apps	(Points)
2019–2020	F.I.R. Academy		
2020–2024	Benetton	48	(85)
2024–	Toulon	27	(40)
- Correct as of 16 Sep 2026
International career
Years	Team	Apps	(Points)
2020	Italy U20	3	(0)
2020–	Italy	36	(5)
- Correct as of 16 Sep 2026

Gianmarco Lucchesi (born 10 September 2000) is an Italian professional rugby union player who plays hooker for Toulon in the Top 14.

== Professional career ==
Lucchesi has previously played for clubs such as Gran Ducato in the past. Initially he was named as Permit Player for the last part of 2019–20 Pro14 season and 2020–21 Pro14 season, but he immediately became a full time player in the Benetton squad. He played for Benetton until 2023–24 United Rugby Championship season.

In January 2020, Lucchesi was named in the Italy Under 20 squad for the 2020 Six Nations Under 20s Championship. From October 2020 he is also part of Italy squad, having made his test debut against Ireland during the 2020 Six Nations Championship.
