= Thomas Dominguez =

Argentine rugby union player (born 1999)

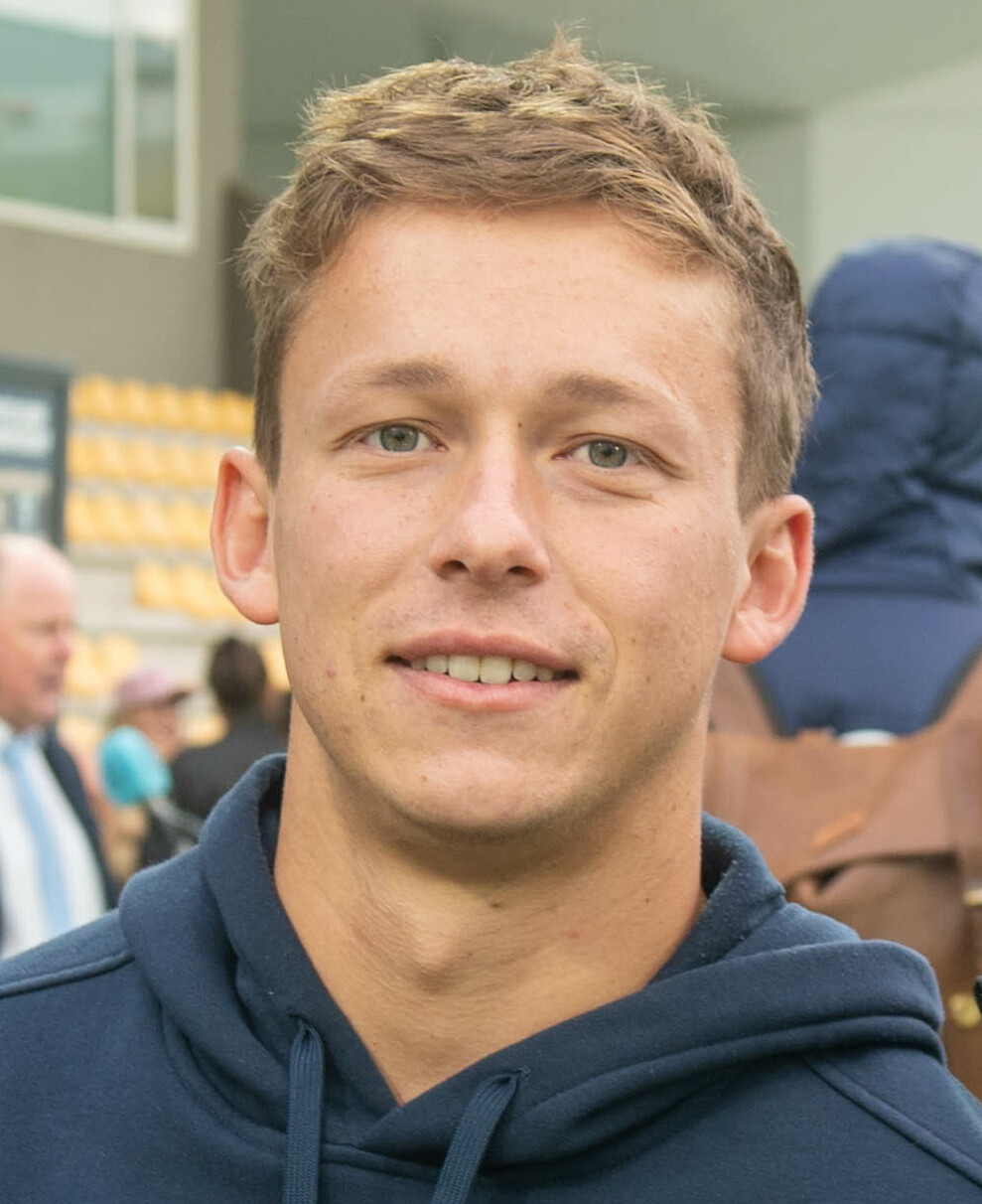
- Dominguez in 2023
- Born: Thomas Dominguez; 18 December 1999 (age 26) Paris, France
- Height: 1.75 m (5 ft 9 in)
- Weight: 79 kg (12.4 st; 174 lb)
- Notable relative: Diego Dominguez (father)

Rugby union career
- Position: Scrum-half
- Current team: Zebre Parma
Amateur team(s)
Years	Team	Apps	(Points)
2018–2020	CASI	4	(5)
Senior career
Years	Team	Apps	(Points)
2021–2023	Valorugby Emilia	26	(66)
2023−	Zebre Parma	37	(36)
- Correct as of 9 Aug 2026

Thomas Dominguez (born 18 December 1999) is a French-born Argentine rugby union player, currently playing for United Rugby Championship side Zebre Parma. His preferred position is scrum-half. He is one of the sons of rugby player Diego Dominguez.

== Professional career ==
In the 2021−2022 season, he played for Italian Top10 side Valorugby Emilia. Dominguez signed for Zebre Parma a short contract in September 2023 ahead of the 2023–24 United Rugby Championship. He made his debut in Round 1 of the 2023–24 season against the Ulster.

Dominguez is eligible to play with Italy due to residency background, Argentina since his father is Argentinian and for France because is his birth country.
