= Will Greatbanks =

English rugby union player

- Full name: William Greatbanks
- Born: 18 January 2003 (age 23) England
- Height: 198 cm (6 ft 6 in)
- Weight: 109 kg (240 lb; 17 st 2 lb)

Rugby union career
- Position: Lock
- Current team: Ospreys
Senior career
Years	Team	Apps	(Points)
2021–2024	Soyaux Angoulême	11	(5)
2024–	Ospreys	7	(0)
- Correct as of 11 December 2025

Will Greatbanks (born 18 January 2003) is an English rugby union player, who plays for the Ospreys in the United Rugby Championship. His preferred position is lock.

== Early career ==
Greatbanks was born in England, but spent much of his youth in France. He played youth rugby for CAR Riberac before joining the Bordeaux academy in 2018. After one year he joined the Soyaux Angoulême winning the French Espoirs championship in 2021. He is Welsh qualified through his Welsh-born father.

== Professional career ==
Greatbanks made his professional debut for Soyaux Angoulême in the third round of the 2023–24 Rugby Pro D2 season season, starting the fixture against Biarritz. He would make a further ten appearances for the side, scoring one try. In March 2024, it was announced he would sign for the Ospreys ahead of the following season. He made his debut for the side in October 2024 against the Bulls.
