= Lewis Lloyd (rugby union) =

Welsh rugby union player

- Born: 20 July 2003 (age 23) Wales
- Height: 180 cm (5 ft 11 in)
- Weight: 105 kg (231 lb; 16 st 7 lb)

Rugby union career
- Position: Hooker
- Current team: Ospreys
Senior career
Years	Team	Apps	(Points)
2023–	Ospreys	25	(10)
- Correct as of 11 December 2025
International career
Years	Team	Apps	(Points)
2023	Wales U20	7	(20)
- Correct as of 11 December 2025

Lewis Lloyd (born 20 July 2003) is a Welsh rugby union player, who plays for the Ospreys in the United Rugby Championship. His preferred position is hooker.

== Early career ==
Lloyd is from Wales and came through the Ospreys academy, representing their U18 side in 2020. He plays his club rugby for Treorchy RFC, having represented them since youth level. He represented the Wales U20 side in 2023.

== Professional career ==
Lloyd made his professional debut for the Ospreys in round 1 of the 2023–24 United Rugby Championship against Connacht. He would go on to make another ten appearances that season, scoring his first try against the Lions. He would make a further nine appearances the following season. Lloyd on occasion has been forced to play flanker for the side due to player availability.

On 2 January 2026, Lloyd signed an extension with the Ospreys.
