= Sam Parry =

Wales international rugby union player

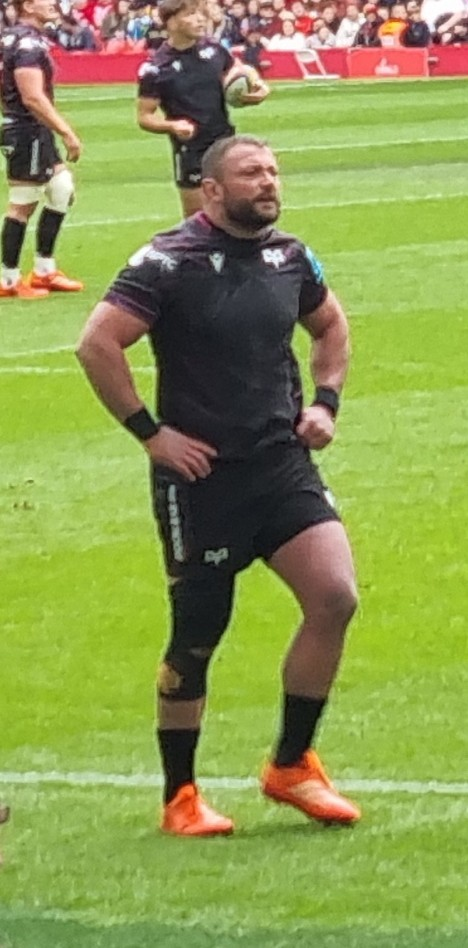
- Sam Parry in 2025
- Born: Sam Lewis Thomas Parry; 17 December 1991 (age 34) Haverfordwest, Wales
- Height: 186 cm (6 ft 1 in)
- Weight: 113 kg (249 lb; 17 st 11 lb)
- School: Prendergast Junior School

Rugby union career
- Position: Hooker
- Current team: Ospreys
Senior career
Years	Team	Apps	(Points)
2010–11	Llandovery	0	(0)
2011–2014	Newport RFC	15	(0)
2011–2014	Newport Gwent Dragons	54	(0)
2014–	Ospreys	175	(230)
2019	→ Bristol (loan)	4	(0)
- Correct as of 12 October 2022
International career
Years	Team	Apps	(Points)
2011	Wales U20	4	(0)
2020–2024	Wales	7	(10)
- Correct as of 12 October 2022

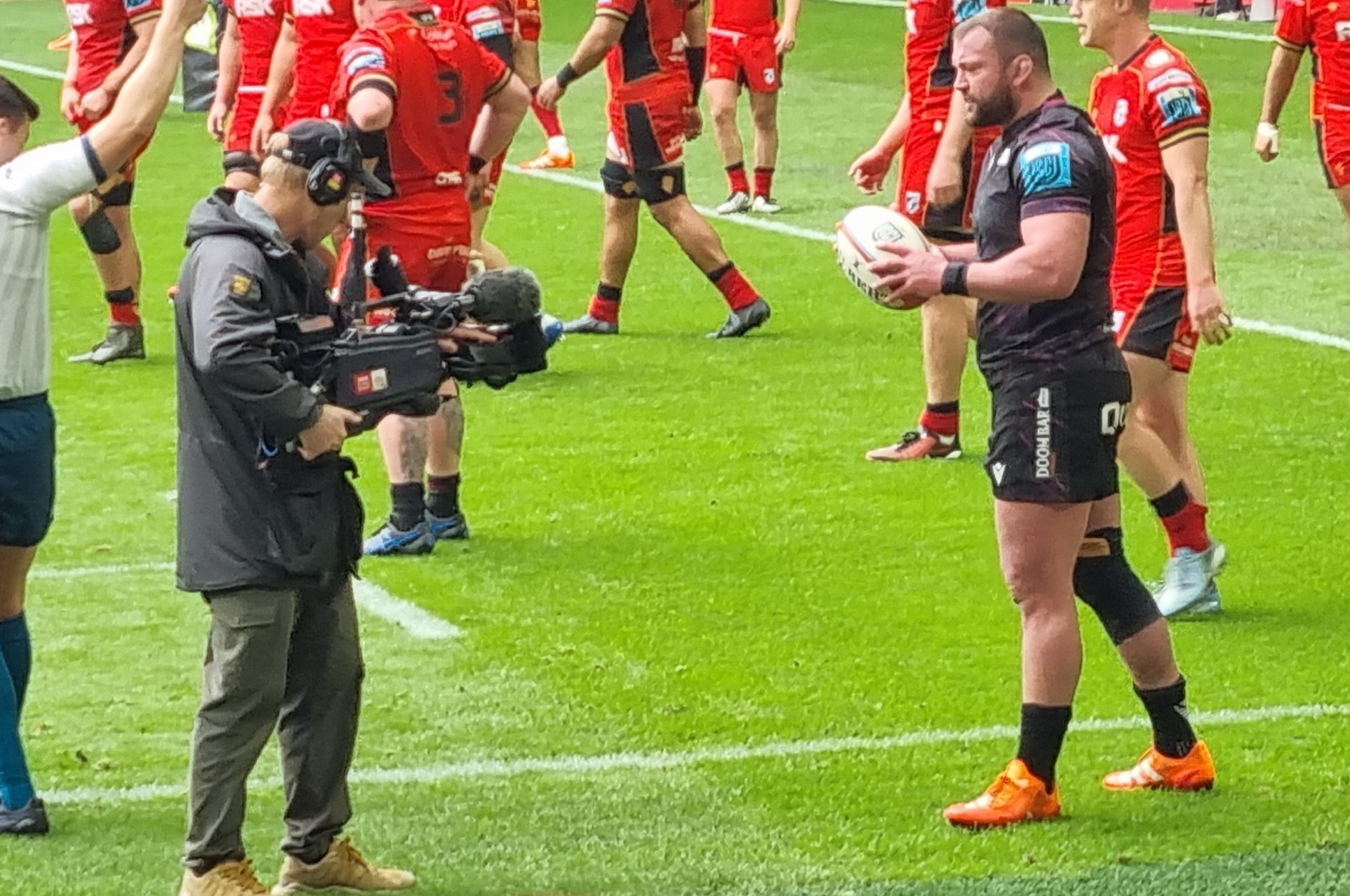
Sam parry at the Judgment Day 2025.

Sam Parry (born 17 December 1991) is a Welsh international rugby union player. His position is hooker.

Parry began his rugby career at Llandovery RFC before joining the Scarlets Under-18s and then the Newport Gwent Dragons academy. He made his senior debut for Newport Gwent Dragons against Bath on 15 October 2011. Parry joined the Ospreys for the 2014–15 season.

== International ==
In May 2013 he was selected in the Wales national rugby union team training squad for the summer 2013 tour to Japan.

In January 2014 he was called up to the Wales squad for the 2014 Six Nations Championship.

Parry was called up for Wales for the Autumn Nations Series in 2020. He made his debut off the bench against France. Parry later scored a try in the final match against Italy.
