= Max Nagy =

English rugby union player (born 1999)

- Born: 13 June 1999 (age 27) Buckingham, England
- Height: 193 cm (6 ft 4 in)
- Weight: 95 kg (14 st 13 lb)
- University: Swansea University

Rugby union career
- Position: Wing / Fullback
Youth career
- Buckingham RFC
Senior career
Years	Team	Apps	(Points)
2019–	Swansea RFC	10	(15)
2021–	Ospreys	32	(30)
- Correct as of 20 January 2024

Max Nagy (born 13 June 1999) is a professional rugby union player, currently playing for United Rugby Championship side Ospreys as a wing or fullback.

== Career ==
Nagy was born in Buckingham, and played youth rugby for Buckingham RFC. He was part of the Northampton Saints academy, playing as an outside half. After being released, he returned to Buckingham RFC, before a playing stint in New Zealand. Nagy later attended Swansea University, and played for the university team as a fullback and wing.

While at Swansea University, he signed for Swansea RFC and was part of the Ospreys Development side.

Nagy was named in the squad for Round 3 of the Pro14 Rainbow Cup competition in the match against Dragons. He made his debut in the same match as a replacement, scoring a try.

In 2024, Nagy was confirmed as eligible to represent Wales, qualifying on residency while attending Swansea University.
