= Morgan Morris =

Welsh rugby union player

- Full name: Morgan Morris
- Born: 28 August 1998 (age 28) Swansea, Wales
- Height: 183 cm (6 ft 0 in)
- Weight: 109 kg (17 st 2 lb; 240 lb)
- School: Gowerton; Hartpury College

Rugby union career
- Position: Number 8
- Current team: Ospreys
Senior career
Years	Team	Apps	(Points)
2017–	Ospreys	111	(115)
International career
Years	Team	Apps	(Points)
2017–2018	Wales U20	6	(5)

Morgan Morris (born 28 August 1998) is a Welsh rugby union player who plays for Ospreys in the back row.

== Career ==
Morris was involved with the Ospreys U16 team, before attending Hartpury College, where he was involved with their team, as well as Gloucester U18.

A Wales U20 international, Morris represented the side in the 2017 and 2018 Six Nations Under 20s Championship.

Morris made his debut for the Ospreys in 2018 against Connacht having previously played for the Ospreys academy and Swansea RFC. Morgan began his rugby career at junior level at Penclawdd RFC. Morris is a dynamic ball carrier and a constant breakdown threat, winning Ospreys player of the season in both the 2020/21 and the 21/22 seasons.

On 17 December 2022, Morris was named man of the match in the Ospreys away victory over Montpellier, scoring a try to secure the win.
