= Andrea Piardi =

Italian rugby union referee (born 1992)

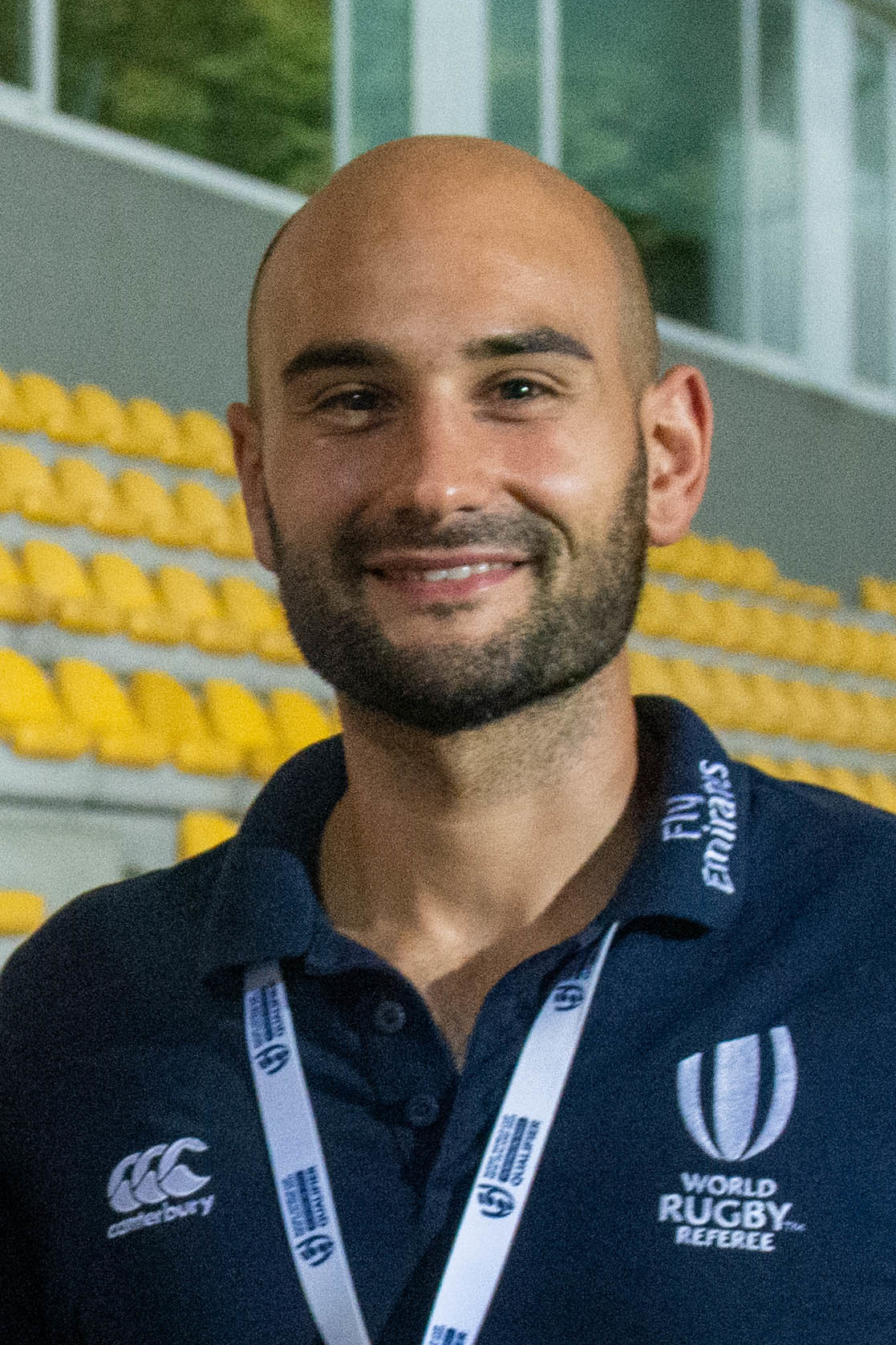
- Andrea Piardi in Parma in 2021
- Born: 8 August 1992 (age 34) Brescia, Italy

Rugby union career
Refereeing career
Years	Competition	Apps
2019–	United Rugby Championship	17
2024-	Six Nations	
2024-	Rugby Championship	

Andrea Piardi (born 8 August 1992) is an Italian rugby union referee. He is the first game official from his country to have refereed in both the Six Nations and the Rugby Championship.

== Career ==
Piardi was born in Brescia in 1992. Having previously refereed in the Italian Top12, he made his Pro14 refereeing debut in a match between Munster and the Southern Kings on 15 February 2019. In 2021, he was announced as an assistant referee for the 2021 Six Nations Championship for the match between Scotland and Wales. In 2021, Piardi refereed two matches in the 2023 Rugby World Cup qualifiers Americas section, refereeing Uruguay's matches against Chile and Brazil on 17 July and 25 July respectively.

On 19 June 2022 he refereed a match between England and the Barbarian F.C. selection.
