= Keiran Williams =

Wales international rugby union player

- Full name: Keiran Williams
- Born: 4 December 1997 (age 28) Neath, Wales
- Height: 178 cm (5 ft 10 in)
- Weight: 97 kg (15 st 4 lb; 214 lb)
- School: Coleg Sir Gâr; Neath Port Talbot College

Rugby union career
- Position: Inside Centre
- Current team: Ospreys
Senior career
Years	Team	Apps	(Points)
2017–	Ospreys	84	(105)
International career
Years	Team	Apps	(Points)
2016–2018	Wales U20	8	(25)
2023–	Wales	1	(0)

Keiran Williams (born 4 December 1997) is a Welsh rugby union player who plays for Ospreys regional team as a centre. Williams has represented Wales, making his debut on 12 August 2023 against England.

== Club career ==
Williams made his debut for the Ospreys regional team in 2018 against Zebre having previously played for the Ospreys academy and Neath RFC. A small but powerful centre, he has been favourably compared to former Ospreys and Wales star Scott Gibbs.

== International career ==
Williams represented Wales as a U20 international.

Williams was selected by Wales for the first time on 17 January 2023, for the upcoming 2023 Six Nations Championship.

Williams was included in the Wales training squad for the 2023 Rugby World Cup. Williams made his debut on 12 August 2023, coming off the bench against England in the 2023 Rugby World Cup warm-up matches.
