= Will Spencer (rugby union) =

English rugby union player

- Born: Will Spencer; 30 May 1992 (age 34) Oxford, England
- Height: 2.01 m (6 ft 7 in)
- Weight: 124.75 kg (275.0 lb; 19 st 9.0 lb)
- School: Swanmore College

Rugby union career
- Position: Lock
- Current team: Ospreys
Youth career
- ??: Petersfield RFC
Senior career
Years	Team	Apps	(Points)
2011–2016	Bath	22	(10)
2013–2014	→ London Welsh (loan)	7	(0)
2016–2018	Worcester Warriors	33	(10)
2018–2020	Leicester Tigers	33	(5)
2020–2024	Bath		
2024-	Northampton Saints		
- Correct as of 6 September 2024

Will Spencer (born 30 May 1992 in Oxford, England) is an English professional rugby union player. He plays at lock. His current club is Ospreys and has previously played for Bath, Leicester Tigers, London Welsh and Worcester Warriors.

== Career ==
On 13 January 2016, Spencer makes the move to local rivals Worcester Warriors from the 2016–17 season.

In May 2017 he was invited to a training camp with the senior England squad by Eddie Jones.

On 26 January 2018, Spencer signs for Premiership rivals Leicester Tigers ahead of the 2018–19 season.

He joined Bath ahead of the resumption of the 2019–20 season.
