= Jack Walsh (rugby union) =

Australian rugby union player

- Born: 11 January 2000 (age 26) Jacksonville, United States
- Height: 1.80 m (5 ft 11 in)
- Weight: 80 kg (13 st; 180 lb)

Rugby union career
- Position: Fly-half
Amateur team(s)
Years	Team	Apps	(Points)
2019	Manly	1	(0)
- Correct as of 26 May 2022
Senior career
Years	Team	Apps	(Points)
2020	Waratahs	0	(0)
2020–2022	Exeter Chiefs	9	(22)
2022–	Ospreys	81	(232)
- Correct as of 17 April 2026

Jack Walsh (born 11 January 2000) is an American-born Australian rugby union player, currently playing for United Rugby Championship side Ospreys. His preferred position is fly-half.

== Career ==
Walsh came through the Waratahs academy system, having played his junior rugby for Manly, and been named as a wider training squad player for the Waratahs for the 2020 Super Rugby season. He joined Exeter Chiefs in July 2020, and represented the side 5 times over the course of the next two seasons. He signed for the Ospreys ahead of the 2022–23 United Rugby Championship.
