= 2025–26 Cardiff Rugby season =

Cardiff Rugby
- 2025–26 season
- Head coach: Matt Sherratt
- Chairman: Alun Jones
- United Rugby Championship: Quarter-final; 6th, regular season
- Challenge Cup: Round of 16
- URC Welsh Shield: 2nd
- Top try scorer: League: Josh Adams – 7
- Top points scorer: League: Callum Sheedy – 64
- Highest home attendance: 12,125 (RD 8 v Dragons RFC)
- Lowest home attendance: 5,711
- Average home attendance: 9,022

The 2025–26 season will be Cardiff's fifth season in the United Rugby Championship. Along with competing in the URC and its Welsh Shield competition, the club also participate in the 2025-26 EPCR Challenge Cup.

== Transfers ==
=== Players in ===
- (Wales) Ioan Lloyd from (Wales) Scarlets
- (Wales) Taine Basham from (Wales) Dragons
- (Scotland) Javan Sebastian from (Scotland) Edinburgh
- (Wales) Sam Wainwright from (Wales) Scarlets
- (Wales) George Nott from (Wales) Dragons
- (Wales) Ieuan Davies from (England) Bath (season-long loan)
- (Wales) Ioan Emanuel from (England) Bath (season-long loan)
- (Wales) Leigh Halfpenny from (England) Harlequins (short-term deal)
- (England) Will Rigg from (England) Exeter Chiefs (short-term loan)
- (Wales) Osian Roberts from (England) Sale Sharks (short-term loan)
- (South Africa) Cornel Smit from (South Africa) Bulls

=== Players out ===
- (Wales) Thomas Young to (Wales) Dragons
- (England) Rhys Litterick to (Scotland) Edinburgh
- (South Africa) Tinus de Beer to (Wales) Dragons
- (Wales) Seb Davies to (Wales) Dragons
- (Wales) Gwilym Bradley (released)
- (Wales) Regan Grace (released)
- (Samoa) Rey Lee-Lo (retired)
- (England) Gabriel Hamer-Webb to (England) Leicester Tigers
- (Wales) Mackenzie Martin to (Wales) Dragons (season-long loan)
- (Wales) Efan Daniel to (Wales) Ospreys
- (Wales) Ellis Bevan to (England) Bristol Bears (short-term loan)
- (Wales) Joe Cowell to (England) Bedford Blues (short-term loan)
- (Ireland) Ed Byrne to (Ireland) Leinster (short-term loan)

== United Rugby Championship ==
=== Matches ===
27 September 2025	(1 BP) Cardiff (Wales)	33–20	(South Africa) Lions	Cardiff Arms Park
19:45	Try: Thomas 9' c Winnett 23' c Mann 52' c Lloyd 60' c, 76' m Con: Sheedy (4/5) 10', 24', 53', 61'; Cards: Thomas (red card) 30'	Report	Try: Venter 27' c Steenkamp 48' c Con: Dobela (2/2) 28', 49'; Pen: Dobela (2/2) 17', 37'	Attendance: 5,711; Referee: Filippo Russo

4 October 2025	Munster (Ireland)	23–20	(Wales) Cardiff (2 BP)	Thomond Park, Limerick
19:45	Try: Quinn 29' m Coombes 52' c Barron 61' m Con: Crowley 53'; Pen: Crowley 67'; Drop: Crowley 77'	Report	Try: J. Adams 15' m Bowen (3) 44', 57', 80+2'	Attendance: 12,066

11 October 2025	Cardiff (Wales)	14–8	(Ireland) Connacht (1 BP)	Cardiff Arms Park
19:45	Try: Bowen (2) 14' c, 75' c Con: Sheedy 15'; Lloyd 76'	Report	Try: O'Connor 80+2' m Pen: Forde 11'	Attendance: 7,092; Referee: Gianluca Gnecchi (Italy)

17 October 2025	(1 BP) Dragons (Wales)	17–24	(Wales) Cardiff (1 BP)	Rodney Parade, Newport
19:45	Try: Coghlan 7' c Carter 72' c Con: de Beer (2) 8', 73'; Pen: O'Brien 80'	Report	Try: Mann 2' m Faletau 14' c Dan Thomas 20' m Southworth 61' c Con: Sheedy 14'; Ben Thomas 62'	Attendance: 7,483; Referee: Federico Vedovelli (Italy)

25 October 2025	Cardiff (Wales)	20–19	(Scotland) Edinburgh (1 BP)	Cardiff Arms Park
19:45	Try: Mulder 7' m Adams 15' c Sebastian 43' m Con: Lloyd 16'; Pen: Lloyd 74'	Report	Try: Wells 3' m Shiel 9' c Ashman 19' c Con: Scott 9'; Lang 20'	Attendance: 7,189

29 November 2025	Zebre Parma (Italy)	14–29	(Wales) Cardiff (1 BP)	Stadio Sergio Lanfranchi, Parma
13:00	Try: Licata 30' c Zanon 74' c Con: Roger (2/2) 31', 74'; Cards: Licata (yellow card) 16'; Ruggeri (yellow card) 49'; Zanon (yellow card) 80+2'	Report	Try: Hughes (3) 13' c, 18' m, 40' c Basham 80+3' c Con: Lloyd (2/3) 19', 41'; Wilde (1/1) 80+4'; Pen: Lloyd 48'; Cards: Basham (yellow card) 69'	Attendance: 2,392; Referee: Marius van der Westhuizen (South Africa)

19 December 2025	(1 BP) Cardiff (Wales)	17–21	(Wales) Scarlets	Cardiff Arms Park
19:45	Try: Grady 29' c Adams 54' c Con: Sheedy (2) 30', 55'; Pen: Sheedy 41'	Report	Try: James 23' c Davies (2) 51' c, 57' c Con: Hawkins (3) 24', 52', 58'; Cards: Macleod (yellow card) 25'; Davies (yellow card) 28'; Williams (yellow card) 60'	Attendance: 11,278; Referee: Ben Breakspear (Wales)

26 December 2025	Cardiff (Wales)	22–19	(Wales) Dragons (1 BP)	Cardiff Arms Park
15:00	Try: Sebastian 20' c Mann 30' m J Adams 47' c Con: Sheedy (2) 21', 48'; Pen: Sheedy 70'; Cards: McNally (yellow card) 78'	Report	Try: Hope (2) 7' m, 32' c Penalty try 78'; Con: O'Brien, 32'; Cards: Keddie (yellow card) 57'	Attendance: 12,125; Referee: Adam Jones (Wales)

1 January 2026	(1 BP) Ospreys (Wales)	33–22	(Wales) Cardiff (1 BP)	Brewery Field, Bridgend
17:30	Try: Giles 14' c Hardy (2) 25' m, 51' c Parry 42' c Hopkins 69' c Con: D Edwards (4/5) 15', 43', 51', 70'; Cards: Morse (yellow card) 80'	Report	Try: Adams (2) 22' c, 74' m Faletau 76' m Sebastian 80+1' m Con: Sheedy (1/3) 23'; Cards: Belcher (yellow card) 31'	Attendance: 7,700; Referee: Adam Jones (Wales)

24 January 2026	Cardiff (Wales)	17–8	(Italy) Benetton	Cardiff Arms Park
19:45	Try: McNally 49' m Pen: Sheedy (3) 13', 16', 60'; Lloyd 80+1'; Cards: Mann (yellow card) 26'	Report	Try: Ruzza 66' m Pen: Smith 46'	Attendance: 8,052; Referee: Sam Grove-White

31 January 2026	Ulster (Ireland)	21–14	(Wales) Cardiff (1 BP)	Ravenhill Stadium, Belfast
19:45	Try: Wilson 12' c Bell 19' c Irvine 66' c Con: Murphy (3/3) 12', 20', 67'	Report	Try: Mulder 54' c Emanuel 68' c Con: Sheedy (2/2) 55', 69'	Attendance: 12,012; Referee: Hollie Davidson (Scotland)

27 February 2026	Cardiff (Wales)	8–7	(Ireland) Leinster (1 BP)	Cardiff Arms Park
19:45	Try: Davies 54' m Pen: Sheedy 19'	Report	Try: McGrath 68' c Con: Tector (1/1) 69'	Attendance: 7,571; Referee: Sam Grove-White

20 March 2026	(1 BP) Bulls (South Africa)	40–7	(Wales) Cardiff	Loftus Versfeld Stadium, Pretoria
17:00	Try: Coetzee 9' c Grobbelaar 14' m Kriel 27' c Papier 35' c Louw 40' c Vermaak 58' c Con: Pollard (4/5) 10', 28', 36', 41'; Kriel (1/1) 58'	Report	Try: Millard 3' c Con: Sheedy 4'	Attendance: 6,607; Referee: Eoghan Cross

27 March 2026	Sharks (South Africa)	21–15	(Wales) Cardiff (1 BP)	Kings Park Stadium, Durban
17:00	Try: Buthelezi (2) 6' c, 32' c Penxe 38' c Con: Hendrikse (2) 7', 39'; Davids 33'; Cards: Hendrikse (yellow card) 27'	Report	Try: Grady (2) 17' c, 28' m Con: Sheedy 18'; Pen: Lloyd 73'	Referee: Gianluca Gnecchi (Italy)

18 April 2026	(2 BP) Scarlets (Wales)	24–28	(Wales) Cardiff (1 BP)	Parc y Scarlets, Llanelli
17:30	Try: Plumtree 23' m Williams 46' c Blacker 48' m Murray 54' c Con: Hawkins (2) 47', 55'; Cards: Plumtree (yellow card) 70'; Murray (yellow card) 76'	Report	Try: Thomas 10' c Sebastian (2) 71' c, 79' c Winnett 76' c Con: Sheedy (4) 10', 72', 76', 80+1'	Referee: Morné Ferreira (South Africa)

24 April 2026	Cardiff (Wales)	24–21	(Wales) Ospreys (1BP)	Cardiff Arms Park
19:45	Try: Thornton 24' c Belcher 46' c Thomas 56'; Con: Sheedy (3) 25', 47', 57'; Pen: Sheedy 17'; Cards: Belcher (yellow card) 7'; McNally (yellow card) 75'	Report	Try: Williams 37' c Walsh 68' c Edwards 76' c Con: Edwards (3) 38', 69', 77'; Cards: Kasende (red card) 18'; Watkin (yellow card) 24'; Edwards (yellow card) 46'	Referee: Christopher Allison (South Africa)

8 May 2026	(1 BP) Glasgow Warriors (Scotland)	40–17	(Wales) Cardiff	Scotstoun Stadium, Glasgow
19:45	Try: Dempsey 19' c Steyn 24' c Matthews (2) 32' c, 54' c Schickerling 65' m Rowe 74' c Con: Horne (4/5) 20', 26', 33', 55'; O. Smith (1/1) 74'	Report	Try: J Adams 28' c Southworth 59' m Beetham 80' m Con: Sheedy (1/3) 29'	Attendance: 7,321; Referee: Eoghan Cross (Ireland)

15 May 2026	(1 BP) Cardiff (Wales)	22–16	(South Africa) Stormers (1 BP)	Cardiff Arms Park
19:45	Try: Beetham (2) 16' c, 49' m Bowen 20' m Lloyd 40' m Con: Lloyd (1/4) 17'; Cards: Belcher (yellow card) 4'; Hughes (yellow card) 80+1'	Report	Try: A. Smith 7'; Con: Feinberg-Mngomezulu 8'; Pen: Feinberg-Mngomezulu (3) 30', 46', 80+2'; Cards: A Smith (yellow card) 38'	Attendance: 10,143; Referee: Andrew Brace (Ireland)

=== Tables ===
Pos	Team	Pld	W	D	L	PF	PA	PD	TF	TA	TB	LB	Pts	Qualification
1	Glasgow Warriors	18	13	0	5	479	338	+141	72	48	11	2	65	Qualification for the Champions Cup and knockout stage
2	Leinster	18	12	0	6	515	370	+145	77	51	13	2	63	Qualification for the Champions Cup and knockout stage
3	Stormers	18	12	1	5	504	344	+160	63	48	9	1	60	Qualification for the Champions Cup and knockout stage
4	Bulls	18	12	0	6	576	406	+170	82	59	10	1	59	Qualification for the Champions Cup and knockout stage
5	Munster	18	11	0	7	396	376	+20	59	51	8	3	55	Qualification for the Champions Cup and knockout stage
6	Cardiff	18	11	0	7	353	372	−19	52	52	7	4	55	Qualification for the Champions Cup and knockout stage
7	Lions	18	10	1	7	532	473	+59	73	70	9	3	54	Qualification for the Champions Cup and knockout stage
8	Connacht	18	10	0	8	442	395	+47	62	56	10	4	54	Qualification for the Champions Cup and knockout stage
9	Ulster	18	9	1	8	494	420	+74	72	60	10	4	52	Qualification for the Challenge Cup
10	Sharks	18	8	1	9	467	428	+39	71	57	9	3	46	Qualification for the Challenge Cup
11	Ospreys	18	7	2	9	376	454	−78	55	69	4	3	39	Qualification for the Challenge Cup
12	Edinburgh	18	7	0	11	362	439	−77	57	66	6	4	38	Qualification for the Challenge Cup
13	Benetton	18	6	2	10	327	493	−166	41	71	4	1	33	Qualification for the Challenge Cup
14	Scarlets	18	4	2	12	361	460	−99	52	63	3	5	28	Qualification for the Challenge Cup
15	Dragons	18	3	4	11	350	481	−131	46	71	4	4	28	Qualification for the Challenge Cup
16	Zebre Parma	18	2	0	16	312	587	−275	43	85	3	4	15	Qualification for the Challenge Cup

Updated to match(es) played on 16 May 2026. Source: UnitedRugby.com
Rules for classification: Tiebreakers for teams tied on points: 1) Number of matches won 2) The difference between points for and points against 3) The number of tries scored 4) The most points scored 5) The difference between tries for and tries against 6) The fewest red cards received 7) The fewest yellow cards received.

=== Play-offs ===
For the first time in their history, Cardiff reached the United Rugby Championship play-offs, becoming the 14th of the current teams to do so in the URC era.

The top eight teams in the regular season standings advance to the knockout stage, a single-elimination tournament culminating in a Grand Final to crown the overall champion.

Teams are seeded based on the regular season standings, with teams ranked 1–4 receiving home field advantage in the quarter-final, with 1 playing 8, 2 playing 7 etc. The top two teams in the standings are seeded so as not to meet until the Grand Final.

Home-field advantage for the semi-finals and Grand Final will be awarded to the highest-ranked team in each tie; the top two teams are therefore guaranteed home advantage until the final for as long as they remain in the tournament, and the top ranked team, Glasgow Warriors, in the standings will be awarded home advantage should they reach the Grand Final. In the build up to the final week of the regular season, it was reported that Glasgow Warriors may be forced to play a semi-final and final outside Scotland due to venue unavailability, although they would technically remain the home team. In the week of the quarter-final, it was announced they would, if they progressed, play their semi-final and Grand Final on home soil, at Murrayfield Stadium, Edinburgh.

Cardiff and Lions both made the play-offs for the first time. Stormers, Glasgow Warriors, Leinster, Munster and Bulls reached their fifth URC play-off phase from five seasons. Glasgow Warriors became the first non-Irish team to top the regular season table and take the number one seeding since they did so themselves in 2019.

Quarter-finals
1	(Scotland) Glasgow Warriors	33
8	(Ireland) Connacht	21
4	(South Africa) Bulls	45
5	(Ireland) Munster	14
3	(South Africa) Stormers	44
6	(Wales) Cardiff	21
2	(Ireland) Leinster	59
7	(South Africa) Lions	10

Semi-finals
1	(Scotland) Glasgow Warriors	21
4	(South Africa) Bulls	22
2	(Ireland) Leinster	20
3	(South Africa) Stormers	11

Final
2	(Ireland) Leinster
4	(South Africa) Bulls

Quarter-final

30 May 2026	Stormers (South Africa) (3)	44–21	(6) (Wales) Cardiff	DHL Stadium, Cape Town
15:30	Try: Venter 24' c Mchunu 29' c Zas 36' c Feinberg-Mngomezulu 52' m de Villiers 64' m Kotze 78' c Con: Feinberg-Mngomezulu (3/4) 25', 30', 37'; Jurie Matthee (1/2) 79'; Pen: Matthee (2) 69', 80+1'	Report	Try: Winnett 19' c Basham 45' c Botham 60' c Con: Lloyd (3/3) 20', 46', 61'; Cards: Assiratti (yellow card) 32'; Sebastian (yellow card) 64'	Attendance: 30,595; Referee: Eoghan Cross (Ireland)

=== URC Welsh Shield ===
2025–26 United Rugby Championship Regional Shield tables
(Wales) Welsh Shield
	Team	P	W	D	L	PF	PA	PD	TF	TA	TBP	LBP	Pts	Pos overall
1	(Wales) Ospreys	6	4	1	1	145	117	+28	21	17	2	1	21	11
2	(Wales) Cardiff	6	4	0	2	137	135	+2	20	20	3	1	20	6
3	(Wales) Dragons	6	1	2	3	131	124	+7	17	19	2	3	13	15
4	(Wales) Scarlets	6	1	1	4	124	161	–37	19	21	2	3	11	14
If teams are level at any stage, tiebreakers are applied in the following order: 1. number of matches won 2. the difference between points for and points against 3. the number of tries scored 4. the most points scored 5. the difference between tries for and tries against 6. the fewest red cards received 7. the fewest yellow cards received
Green background indicates teams currently leading the regional shield. Upon the conclusion of the regular season, these teams win their respective regional shields. (S) : URC Shield champion

== European Challenge Cup ==
Cardiff have been drawn in Pool 3 of the 2025–26 EPCR Challenge Cup, alongside Ulster, Cheetahs, Exeter Chiefs, Racing 92 and Stade Francais. As Ulster are the only fellow URC team in the pool, Cardiff will play each of the other teams once.

=== Pool standings ===
EPCR Challenge Cup Pool 3
Pos	Team	Pld	W	D	L	PF	PA	PD	TF	TA	TB	LB	Pts	Qualification
1	(Ireland) Ulster (3)	4	3	0	1	141	55	+86	21	8	4	1	17	Home round of 16
2	(France) Stade Français (4)	4	3	0	1	129	90	+39	19	13	3	1	16	Home round of 16
3	(England) Exeter Chiefs (7)	4	2	1	1	129	70	+59	18	11	3	1	14	Home round of 16
4	(Wales) Cardiff (15)	4	2	0	2	78	108	−30	11	17	2	0	10	Away round of 16
5	(France) Racing 92	4	1	1	2	82	152	−70	13	21	2	0	8	
6	(South Africa) Cheetahs	4	0	0	4	62	146	−84	9	21	1	1	2	

Source: EPCR
Rules for classification: Tiebreakers for teams tied on points: 1) Number of matches won; 2) Difference between points for and against; 3) Total number of points for; 4) Aggregate number of points scored in matches between tied teams; 5) Number of matches won excluding the first match, then the second and so on until the tie is settled.

=== Pool matches ===
6 December 2025	(1 BP) Stade Français (France)	38–17	(Wales) Cardiff	Stade Jean-Bouin, Paris
14:00	Try: Ibo (2) 17' m, 50' m Halaifonua 42' c Sclezo 61' c Foursans-Bourdette 66' c Laloi 76' c Con: Foursans-Bourdette (4/6) 42', 62', 67', 77'	Report	Try: Stephens 24' m Young 34' m Sebastian 79' c Con: Wilde (2/3) 80'	Attendance: 10,643; Referee: Peter Martin (Ireland)

13 December 2025	(1 BP) Cardiff (Wales)	29–26	(Ireland) Ulster (2 BP)	Cardiff Arms Park, Cardiff
20:00	Try: Nott 7' c Bowen 13' m Southworth 65' c Thomas 73' c Con: Halfpenny (1/1) 8'; Sheedy (2/2) 65', 74'; Pen: Sheedy (1/1) 80+1'; Cards: Botham (yellow card) 68'	Report	Try: Stewart 22' c Hume 40' c Kok (2) 45' m, 54' c Con: Flannery (3/4) 23', 41', 55'; Cards: Sheridan (yellow card) 68'; Carson (yellow card) 72'	Attendance: 6,425; Referee: Evan Urruzmendi (France)

10 January 2026	(1 BP) Cardiff (Wales)	32–13	(France) Racing 92	Cardiff Arms Park, Cardiff
15:15	Try: Bowen 6' c Thornton 40' m Assiratti 45' c Thomas 74' c Con: Sheedy (2/3) 7', 46'; Beetham (1/1) 75'; Pen: Sheedy (2/2) 55', 65'	Report	Try: Ravutaumada 13' m Prisciantelli 31' m Pen: Gibert (1/1) 5'; Cards: Ravutaumada (yellow card) 1'	Attendance: 8,400; Referee: Sara Cox (England)

18 January 2026	(1 BP) Exeter Chiefs (England)	31–0	(Wales) Cardiff	Sandy Park, Exeter
13:00	Try: Tchumbadze (2) 5' c, 19' c Dweba 23' m Heaven 66' c Brown-Bampoe 77' m Con: Slade (3/4) 6', 20', 67'	Report	Cards: Thornton (yellow card) 18'	Attendance: 8,756; Referee: Griffin Colby (South Africa)

=== Knock-out stage ===
Round of 16
1	(France) Montpellier	53
16	(France) Perpignan	13
8	(Ireland) Connacht	29
9	(South Africa) Sharks	12
5	(Italy) Zebre Parma	31
12	(France) Pau	15
4	(France) Stade Français	31
13	(Wales) Dragons	36
3	(Ireland) Ulster	28
14	(Wales) Ospreys	24
6	(England) Newcastle Red Bulls	18
11	(France) La Rochelle	26
2	(Italy) Benetton	38
15	(Wales) Cardiff	35
7	(England) Exeter Chiefs	31
10	(Ireland) Munster	21

Quarter-finals
1	(France) Montpellier	45
8	(Ireland) Connacht	22
5	(Italy) Zebre Parma	32
13	(Wales) Dragons	35
3	(Ireland) Ulster	41
11	(France) La Rochelle	24
2	(Italy) Benetton	41
7	(England) Exeter Chiefs	44

Semi-finals
1	(France) Montpellier	18
13	(Wales) Dragons	12
3	(Ireland) Ulster	29
7	(England) Exeter Chiefs	12

Final
1	(France) Montpellier	59
3	(Ireland) Ulster	26

Round of 16

4 April 2026	Benetton (Italy) (2)	38–35	(15) (Wales) Cardiff	Stadio Comunale di Monigo, Treviso
18:30	Try: Menoncello (2) 1' c, 41' m Umaga (2) 2' c, 13' c Gallo 12' c Ratave 28' m Con: Umaga (4/6) 1', 3', 12', 14'; Cards: Umaga (yellow card) 45'	Report	Try: Belcher 8' c Beetham (2) 21' c, 53' c Lawrence 39' c Bevan 44' c Con: Sheedy (5/5) 9', 22', 40', 45', 54'	Attendance: 5,000; Referee: Kevin Bralley (France)
