= 2025–26 Ospreys (rugby union) season =

Ospreys
- Union: (Wales) Welsh Rugby Union
- Founded: 2003; 23 years ago
- Location: Swansea, Wales
- Ground: Brewery Field (Capacity: 8,000)
- CEO: Lance Bradley
- Coach: Mark Jones
- Captain: Jac Morgan
- Top scorer: Dan Edwards (49 points)
- Most tries: Kieran Hardy (5 tries)
- League: United Rugby Championship
- 2024–25: 14th
1st kit	2nd kit

Official website
- www.ospreysrugby.com

The 2025–26 season is the Ospreys' fifth season in the United Rugby Championship, and their 23rd season of professional rugby. Along with competing in the URC and its Welsh Shield competition, the club will also participate in the 2025-26 European Rugby Challenge Cup.

The Ospreys were due to relocate to the St Helen's Rugby and Cricket Ground following a 20 year stay at the Swansea.com Stadium. However, it was announced on 12 August 2025 that the Ospreys would play all of their home games at Brewery Field in Bridgend for the 2025–26 season. This was done to allow redevelopment work to be completed at St Helen's, due to be completed by the start of the following season.

== United Rugby Championship ==
Main table

Pos	Team	Pld	W	D	L	PF	PA	PD	TF	TA	TB	LB	Pts	Qualification
1	Glasgow Warriors	18	13	0	5	479	338	+141	72	48	11	2	65	Qualification for the Champions Cup and knockout stage
2	Leinster	18	12	0	6	515	370	+145	77	51	13	2	63	Qualification for the Champions Cup and knockout stage
3	Stormers	18	12	1	5	504	344	+160	63	48	9	1	60	Qualification for the Champions Cup and knockout stage
4	Bulls	18	12	0	6	576	406	+170	82	59	10	1	59	Qualification for the Champions Cup and knockout stage
5	Munster	18	11	0	7	396	376	+20	59	51	8	3	55	Qualification for the Champions Cup and knockout stage
6	Cardiff	18	11	0	7	353	372	−19	52	52	7	4	55	Qualification for the Champions Cup and knockout stage
7	Lions	18	10	1	7	532	473	+59	73	70	9	3	54	Qualification for the Champions Cup and knockout stage
8	Connacht	18	10	0	8	442	395	+47	62	56	10	4	54	Qualification for the Champions Cup and knockout stage
9	Ulster	18	9	1	8	494	420	+74	72	60	10	4	52	Qualification for the Challenge Cup
10	Sharks	18	8	1	9	467	428	+39	71	57	9	3	46	Qualification for the Challenge Cup
11	Ospreys	18	7	2	9	376	454	−78	55	69	4	3	39	Qualification for the Challenge Cup
12	Edinburgh	18	7	0	11	362	439	−77	57	66	6	4	38	Qualification for the Challenge Cup
13	Benetton	18	6	2	10	327	493	−166	41	71	4	1	33	Qualification for the Challenge Cup
14	Scarlets	18	4	2	12	361	460	−99	52	63	3	5	28	Qualification for the Challenge Cup
15	Dragons	18	3	4	11	350	481	−131	46	71	4	4	28	Qualification for the Challenge Cup
16	Zebre Parma	18	2	0	16	312	587	−275	43	85	3	4	15	Qualification for the Challenge Cup

Updated to match(es) played on 16 May 2026. Source: UnitedRugby.com
Rules for classification: Tiebreakers for teams tied on points: 1) Number of matches won 2) The difference between points for and points against 3) The number of tries scored 4) The most points scored 5) The difference between tries for and tries against 6) The fewest red cards received 7) The fewest yellow cards received.

27 September 2025	(1 BP) Bulls (South Africa)	53 – 40	(Wales) Ospreys (1 BP)	Loftus Versfeld Stadium, Pretoria
13:00	Try: Coetzee (8', 21'); Grobbelaar (39', 45', 58'); Jooste (51', 72'); Serfontein (61'); Else (68'); Con: Johannes (9', 40', 59', 69')	Report	Try: Giles (2', 80'); Keiran Williams (6', 35'); Walsh (30'); Morse (66'); Con: Edwards (6', 31', 36', 66', 81')	Attendance: 2 992; Referee: Peter Martin

3 October 2025	Stormers (South Africa)	26 – 10	(Wales) Ospreys	Cape Town Stadium
18:00	Try: Roos (10'); Simelane (58') de Villiers (70'); Con: Matthee (59'); Pen: Matthee (41', 44', 57')	Report	Try: Hardy (3', 29')	Attendance: 13 668; Referee: Peter Martin

11 October 2025	Ospreys (Wales)	24 – 0	(Italy) Zebre Parma	Brewery Field, Bridgend
15:00	Try: Cokanasiga (15'); Morse (18'); Ratti (74'); Con: D. Edwards (16', 18', 75'); Pen: D. Edwards (59')	Report		Attendance: 4,519

18 October 2025	Ospreys	17 – 42	Glasgow Warriors (1 BP)	Brewery Field, Bridgend
19:45	Try: Morgan-williams (13'); Morgan (45'); Con: Edwards (14', 46'); Pen: Edwards (24'); Cards: Lake (yellow card) 29'	Report	Try: Dobie (9', 50'); Steyn (16'); Matthews (40'+1); Ferrie (62'); Duncan (76); Con: A Hastings (9', 17' 40'+2, 51', 63'); Lancaster (77')	Referee: Andrea Piardi (Italy)

25 October 2025	Dragons (Wales)	19 – 19	(Wales) Ospreys	Rodney Parade, Newport
17:30	Try: R Williams (38' c); Coghlan (60' c); Burrows (76' m); Con: de Beer (40', 61')	Report	Try: Deaves (15' m); Cokanasiga (20' c); Hopkins (46' c); Con: Edwards (20', 47'); Cards: Kasende (yellow card) 80'	Attendance: 5,511; Referee: Ben Breakspear

29 November 2025	Edinburgh (Scotland)	19 – 17	(Wales) Ospreys (1 BP)	Edinburgh Rugby Stadium
17:30	Try: Currie (33' m); Morris (54' c); Paterson (71' c); Con: Thompson (1/2) (55'); Scott (1/1) (71')	Report	Try: Davies (25' m); Cokanasiga (45' m); Boshoff (75' c); Con: Walsh (76')	Attendance: 6,502; Referee: Peter Martin (Ireland)

20 December 2025	Ospreys (Wales)	10 – 26	(Ireland) Munster (1 BP)	Brewery Field, Bridgend
17:30	Try: Morris 54' c Con: Edwards 55'; Pen: Edwards 11'; Cards: Nagy (yellow card) 15'	Report	Try: Daly 17' m Baron 36' c Crowley 40+1' c Haley 48' c Con: Crowley (3/4) 37', 40+2', 49; Cards: O'Donoghue (yellow card) 54'	Attendance: 4,715; Referee: Sam Grove-White

26 December 2025	(1 BP) Scarlets (Wales)	19 – 26	(Wales) Ospreys (1 BP)	Parc y Scarlets, Llanelli
17:30	Try: Roberts (2) 35' c, 69' m Taylor 80' c Con: Hawkins (2) 35', 80'; Cards: Douglas (yellow card) 75'	Report	Try: Watkin 24' c Lake 29' c Hardy 63' c Hopkins 77' m Con: Dan Edwards (3) 25', 30', 64'; Cards: Williams (yellow card) 18'; Giles (yellow card) 64'	Attendance: 12,105; Referee: Ben Whitehouse (WRU)

1 January 2026	(1 BP) Ospreys (Wales)	33 – 22	(Wales) Cardiff (1 BP)	Brewery Field, Bridgend
17:30	Try: Giles 14' c Hardy (2) 25' m, 51' c Parry 42' c Hopkins 69' c Con: D Edwards (4/5) 15', 43', 51', 70'; Cards: Morse (yellow card) 80'	Report	Try: Adams (2) 22' c, 74' m Faletau 76' m Sebastian 80+1' m Con: Sheedy (1/3) 23'; Cards: Belcher (yellow card) 31'	Attendance: 7,700; Referee: Adam Jones (WRU)

23 January 2026	(1 BP) Ospreys (Wales)	24 – 24	(South Africa) Lions (1 BP)	Brewery Field, Bridgend
19:45	Try: Ratti 24' c Hopkins 34' m Morse 39' c Kasende 63' m Con: Edwards (2/4) 25', 39'; Cards: Lake (yellow card) 27'; Davies (yellow card) 53'	Report	Try: Francke Horn (2) 9' m, 40+4' c PJ Botha 48' m Quan Horn 59' c Con: Smith (2/4) 40+5', 59'; Cards: SJ Kotze (yellow card) 38'; Oosthuizen (yellow card) 66'	Attendance: 4,052; Referee: Federico Vedovelli (ITA)

31 January 2026	Ospreys (Wales)	19 – 13	(Wales) Dragons (1 BP)	Brewery Field, Bridgend
19:45	Try: Morgan-Williams 33' c Lloyd 74' m Giles 80' c Con: Walsh (2/3) 34', 80+1'	Report	Try: de Beer 18' c Con: O'Brien 19'; Pen: O'Brien (2) 47', 58'; Cards: Diamani (yellow card) 73'	Attendance: 5,281; Referee: Ben Connor (Wales)

Sat, Feb 28	Ospreys (Wales)	21-10	(Ireland) Ulster	Brewery Field, Bridgend
19:45		Report

Sat, Mar 21	Benneton (Italy)	v	(Wales) Ospreys	Stadio Monigo
15:00

Sat, Mar 28	Connacht (Ireland)	v	(Wales) Ospreys	Dexcom Stadium, Galway
14:15

Sat, Apr 18	Ospreys (Wales)	v	(South Africa) Sharks	Brewery Field, Bridgend
19:45

Fri, Apr 24	Cardiff (Wales)	v	(Wales) Ospreys	Cardiff Arms Park
19:45

Sat, May 9	Ospreys (Wales)	v	(Wales) Scarlets	Brewery Field, Bridgend
17:30

Sat, May 16	Leinster (Ireland)	v	(Wales) Ospreys	TBC
17:15

== URC Welsh Shield ==
2025–26 United Rugby Championship Regional Shield tables
(Wales) Welsh Shield
	Team	P	W	D	L	PF	PA	PD	TF	TA	TBP	LBP	Pts	Pos overall
1	(Wales) Ospreys	6	4	1	1	145	117	+28	21	17	2	1	21	11
2	(Wales) Cardiff	6	4	0	2	137	135	+2	20	20	3	1	20	6
3	(Wales) Dragons	6	1	2	3	131	124	+7	17	19	2	3	13	15
4	(Wales) Scarlets	6	1	1	4	124	161	–37	19	21	2	3	11	14
If teams are level at any stage, tiebreakers are applied in the following order: 1. number of matches won 2. the difference between points for and points against 3. the number of tries scored 4. the most points scored 5. the difference between tries for and tries against 6. the fewest red cards received 7. the fewest yellow cards received
Green background indicates teams currently leading the regional shield. Upon the conclusion of the regular season, these teams win their respective regional shields. (S) : URC Shield champion

== European Challenge Cup ==
EPCR Challenge Cup Pool 1
Pos	Team	Pld	W	D	L	PF	PA	PD	TF	TA	TB	LB	Pts	Qualification
1	(France) Montpellier (1)	4	4	0	0	119	77	+42	18	10	4	0	20	Home round of 16
2	(Italy) Zebre Parma (5)	4	3	0	1	99	81	+18	12	11	2	0	14	Home round of 16
3	(Ireland) Connacht (8)	4	2	0	2	179	71	+108	26	11	3	2	13	Home round of 16
4	(Wales) Ospreys (14)	4	2	0	2	102	97	+5	16	12	3	2	13	Away round of 16
5	(Georgia (country)) Black Lion	4	1	0	3	58	132	−74	8	20	1	0	5	
6	(France) Montauban	4	0	0	4	81	180	−99	11	25	1	1	2	

Source: EPCR
Rules for classification: Tiebreakers for teams tied on points: 1) Number of matches won; 2) Difference between points for and against; 3) Total number of points for; 4) Aggregate number of points scored in matches between tied teams; 5) Number of matches won excluding the first match, then the second and so on until the tie is settled.

7 December 2025	(1 BP) Ospreys (Wales)	24–21	(Ireland) Connacht (1 BP)	Dunraven Brewery Field, Bridgend
15:15	Try: Deaves 42' m Cokanasiga 57' c R. Smith 67' c Hopkins 75' m Con: Edwards (3/4) 57', 68'; Cards: Ratti (yellow card) 17'; Phillips (yellow card) 28'	Report	Try: Bealham 11' c Jansen 17' c Aungier 23' c Con: Naughton (3/3) 12', 18', 24'; Cards: Buckley (yellow card) 67'	Attendance: 3,311; Referee: Evan Urruzmendi (France)

13 December 2025	Montauban (France)	22–33	(Wales) Ospreys (1 BP)	Stade Sapiac, Montauban
16:15	Try: Maurouard 35' m Tuculet 56' c Kanika 80+4' c Con: Fortune (1/2) 56'; Castel (1/1) 80+5'; Pen: Fortune (1/1) 2'; Cards: Tuculet (yellow card) 14'	Report	Try: Moriarty 6' c Morse 16' c Giles 24' m Daniel 60' c Hardy 71' c Con: Walsh (4/5) 6', 17', 61', 72'; Cards: Conbeer (yellow card) 54'	Attendance: 5,000; Referee: Adam Leal (England)

11 January 2026	Zebre Parma (Italy)	23–19	(Wales) Ospreys (1 BP)	Stadio Sergio Lanfranchi, Parma
14:00	Try: Fusco 21' c Locatelli 73' c Con: da Re (2/2) 23', 74'; Pen: da Re (3/3) 16', 27', 58'	Report	Try: Morse 44' c K. Williams 54' c Con: Edwards (2/3) 45', 55'	Attendance: 2,000; Referee: Griffin Colby (South Africa)

17 January 2026	(2 BP) Ospreys (Wales)	26–31	(France) Montpellier (1 BP)	Dunraven Brewery Field, Bridgend
20:00	Try: Watkin 11' c Lloyd (2) 40' c, 52' c Moriarty 58' m Con: Walsh (3/4) 12', 40+1', 53'	Report	Try: Masibaka (2) 6' c, 35' c Ducros 21' c Hounkpatin 66' c Con: Hogg (4/4) 6', 22, 36', 67'; Pen: Coly (1/1) 80+1'	Attendance: 4,131; Referee: Federico Vedovelli (Italy)

=== Knockout stage ===
Ospreys qualified for the round of sixteen when they confirmed a top four finish in Pool 1 in Round 3 with a bonus point against Zebre Parma. A narrow loss in the final pool game to Montpellier confirmed a fourth place finish in the pool, and an away tie in the round of sixteen.

Round of 16
1	(France) Montpellier	53
16	(France) Perpignan	13
8	(Ireland) Connacht	29
9	(South Africa) Sharks	12
5	(Italy) Zebre Parma	31
12	(France) Pau	15
4	(France) Stade Français	31
13	(Wales) Dragons	36
3	(Ireland) Ulster	28
14	(Wales) Ospreys	24
6	(England) Newcastle Red Bulls	18
11	(France) La Rochelle	26
2	(Italy) Benetton	38
15	(Wales) Cardiff	35
7	(England) Exeter Chiefs	31
10	(Ireland) Munster	21

Quarter-finals
1	(France) Montpellier	45
8	(Ireland) Connacht	22
5	(Italy) Zebre Parma	32
13	(Wales) Dragons	35
3	(Ireland) Ulster	41
11	(France) La Rochelle	24
2	(Italy) Benetton	41
7	(England) Exeter Chiefs	44

Semi-finals
1	(France) Montpellier	18
13	(Wales) Dragons	12
3	(Ireland) Ulster	29
7	(England) Exeter Chiefs	12

Final
1	(France) Montpellier	59
3	(Ireland) Ulster	26

Round of 16

4 April 2026
20:00

Ulster (Ireland) (3)	v	(14) (Wales) Ospreys

Affidea Stadium, Belfast
