= 2025 Wales rugby union tour of Japan =

- Date: 5–12 July 2025
- Coach: Matt Sherratt
- Tour captain: Dewi Lake
- Test series winners: Drawn (1–1)
- Top test point scorer: Dan Edwards (11)
- Top test try scorer: Kieran Hardy (2)
Summary
| P | W | D | L |
Total
| 2 | 1 | 0 | 1 |
Test match
| 2 | 1 | 0 | 1 |
Opponent
| P | W | D | L |
Japan
| 2 | 1 | 0 | 1 |

Tour chronology
- ← Australia 2024

Known as the 2025 Lipovitan-D Challenge Cup (Japanese: リポビタンDチャレンジカップ2025) in Japan for sponsorship reasons, the Wales rugby union team toured Japan in July 2025, as part of the 2025 mid-year rugby union tests. The first Test against the Japan national team took place at the Mikuni World Stadium Kitakyushu on 5 July, followed by the second Test at the Noevir Stadium Kobe on 12 July.

== Background ==
It was Wales' third tour to Japan and their first since 2013, having cancelled a tour to Japan and New Zealand in 2020 due to the COVID-19 pandemic. That 2013 tour saw Japan record their only win over Wales in fourteen previous meetings, including ten Tests. The most recent meeting finished in a 33–30 win for Wales in Cardiff in November 2016. Before the series, a Japan XV played a match against the Māori All Blacks. Cardiff Rugby head coach Matt Sherratt was named as coach for the tour, resuming the role he filled for the last three games of the 2025 Six Nations Championship, following the resignation of Warren Gatland.

Going into the series, Wales had been on a 17-match loss streak, a record for a tier one team. Their most recent win was in October 2023 against Georgia in the 2023 Rugby World Cup pool stage. During this time they hit an all-time low of 12th in the Rugby World Rankings.

== Schedule ==
| Date and time | Venue | Home | Score | Away |
|---|---|---|---|---|
| 28 June 2025, 18:00 JST (UTC+09) | Chichibunomiya Rugby Stadium, Tokyo | Japan XV | 20–53 | Māori All Blacks |
| 5 July 2025, 14:00 JST (UTC+09) | Mikuni World Stadium, Kitakyushu | Japan | 24–19 | Wales |
| 12 July 2025, 14:50 JST (UTC+09) | Noevir Stadium, Kobe | Japan | 22–31 | Wales |

== Venues ==
| Kitakyushu | 2025 Wales rugby union tour of Japan is located in Japan |
|---|---|
| Mikuni World Stadium | 2025 Wales rugby union tour of Japan is located in Japan |
| Capacity: 15,460 | 2025 Wales rugby union tour of Japan is located in Japan |
| Kobe | 2025 Wales rugby union tour of Japan is located in Japan |
| Noevir Stadium | 2025 Wales rugby union tour of Japan is located in Japan |
| Capacity: 30,132 | 2025 Wales rugby union tour of Japan is located in Japan |

== Squads ==
=== Wales ===
Wales were still without a permanent coach following the resignation of Warren Gatland during the 2025 Six Nations Championship. Cardiff Rugby head coach Matt Sherratt was appointed for the final three games of that tournament, and retained the role for the tour to Japan. Cardiff defence coach Gethin Jenkins was also appointed as an assistant, along with Harlequins head coach Danny Wilson and his assistant Adam Jones, and Gloucester's T. Rhys Thomas. Sherratt named a squad of 33 for the tour, including six uncapped players, and named Dewi Lake as captain with Jac Morgan (alongside scrum-half Tomos Williams) being included in the British & Irish Lions' squad for their tour to Australia. Lock Dafydd Jenkins was ruled out of the tour in order to undergo surgery, while fellow locks Adam Beard and Will Rowlands were rested. Prop Henry Thomas was also ruled out while he seeks a specialist opinion on a long-term injury. Also omitted from the squad were wing Ellis Mee, fly-half Gareth Anscombe, centres Max Llewellyn and Nick Tompkins, flanker James Botham and hooker Evan Lloyd. Lock Ben Carter, fly-half Sam Costelow and prop Archie Griffin were recalled after missing the Six Nations due to injury, while scrum-half Kieran Hardy, back-rowers Alex Mann, Josh Macleod and James Ratti, centre Johnny Williams and full-back Cameron Winnett also made a return to the squad.

Caps and ages are as of the first match of the tour (5 July 2025).

| Player | Position | Date of birth (age) | Caps | Club/province |
|---|---|---|---|---|
| Liam Belcher | Hooker | 28 April 1996 (aged 29) | 0 | (Wales) Cardiff |
| Elliot Dee | Hooker | 7 March 1994 (aged 31) | 56 | (Wales) Dragons |
| Dewi Lake (captain) | Hooker | 16 March 1999 (aged 26) | 20 | (Wales) Ospreys |
| Keiron Assiratti | Prop | 30 June 1997 (aged 28) | 14 | (Wales) Cardiff |
| Christian Coleman | Prop | 31 August 1998 (aged 26) | 0 | (Wales) Dragons |
| Archie Griffin | Prop | 24 July 2001 (aged 23) | 6 | (England) Bath |
| Garyn Phillips | Prop | 14 May 2001 (aged 24) | 0 | (Wales) Ospreys |
| Nicky Smith | Prop | 7 April 1994 (aged 31) | 54 | (England) Leicester Tigers |
| Gareth Thomas | Prop | 2 August 1993 (aged 31) | 40 | (Wales) Ospreys |
| Ben Carter | Lock | 23 January 2001 (aged 24) | 12 | (Wales) Dragons |
| Freddie Thomas | Lock | 9 November 2001 (aged 23) | 3 | (England) Gloucester |
| Teddy Williams | Lock | 18 October 2000 (aged 24) | 6 | (Wales) Cardiff |
| Taulupe Faletau | Back row | 12 November 1990 (aged 34) | 108 | (Wales) Cardiff |
| Josh Macleod | Back row | 26 October 1996 (aged 28) | 2 | (Wales) Scarlets |
| Alex Mann | Back row | 6 January 2002 (aged 23) | 5 | (Wales) Cardiff |
| Taine Plumtree | Back row | 9 March 2000 (aged 25) | 7 | (Wales) Scarlets |
| James Ratti | Back row | 14 October 1997 (aged 27) | 1 | (Wales) Ospreys |
| Tommy Reffell | Back row | 27 April 1999 (aged 26) | 27 | (England) Leicester Tigers |
| Aaron Wainwright | Back row | 25 September 1997 (aged 27) | 57 | (Wales) Dragons |
| Kieran Hardy | Scrum-half | 30 November 1995 (aged 29) | 23 | (Wales) Ospreys |
| Reuben Morgan-Williams | Scrum-half | 3 February 1998 (aged 27) | 0 | (Wales) Ospreys |
| Rhodri Williams | Scrum-half | 5 May 1993 (aged 32) | 9 | (Wales) Dragons |
| Sam Costelow | Fly-half | 10 January 2001 (aged 24) | 18 | (Wales) Scarlets |
| Dan Edwards | Fly-half | 7 May 2003 (aged 22) | 2 | (Wales) Ospreys |
| Macs Page | Centre | 17 December 2004 (aged 20) | 0 | (Wales) Scarlets |
| Joe Roberts | Centre | 10 May 2000 (aged 25) | 5 | (Wales) Scarlets |
| Ben Thomas | Centre | 25 November 1998 (aged 26) | 12 | (Wales) Cardiff |
| Johnny Williams | Centre | 18 October 1996 (aged 28) | 5 | (Wales) Scarlets |
| Josh Adams | Wing | 21 April 1995 (aged 30) | 61 | (Wales) Cardiff |
| Keelan Giles | Wing | 29 January 1998 (aged 27) | 0 | (Wales) Ospreys |
| Blair Murray | Wing | 9 October 2001 (aged 23) | 8 | (Wales) Scarlets |
| Tom Rogers | Wing | 17 December 1998 (aged 26) | 9 | (Wales) Scarlets |
| Cameron Winnett | Fullback | 7 January 2003 (aged 22) | 9 | (Wales) Cardiff |

=== Japan ===
On 12 June, Eddie Jones named a wider squad of 37 players to prepare for their matches against the Māori All Blacks (as Japan XV), and their test series against Wales. On 18 June, Shuntaro Kitamura and Asahi Doei were called up as additional cover ahead of the Japan XV game against the Māori All Blacks, and on 29 June, Japan finalised their squad for their two-test series against Wales, following their Japan XV match, which saw some trail players form the Japan XV squad remain with the senior team of the series.

Caps and ages are as of the first match of the tour (5 July 2025).

| Player | Position | Date of birth (age) | Caps | Club/province |
|---|---|---|---|---|
| Hayate Era | Hooker | 18 September 2001 (aged 23) | 0 | (Japan) Kubota Spears |
| Mamoru Harada | Hooker | 15 April 1999 (aged 26) | 10 | (Japan) Toshiba Brave Lupus |
| Kenji Sato | Hooker | 4 January 2003 (aged 22) | 0 | (Japan) Saitama Wild Knights |
| Yota Kamimori | Prop | 26 April 1999 (aged 26) | 0 | (Japan) Kubota Spears |
| Sanshiro Kihara | Prop | 20 January 2003 (aged 22) | 0 | (Japan) Tokyo Sungoliath |
| Sena Kimura | Prop | 24 June 1999 (aged 26) | 0 | (Japan) Toshiba Brave Lupus |
| Kenta Kobayashi | Prop | 2 June 1999 (aged 26) | 0 | (Japan) Tokyo Sungoliath |
| Shuhei Takeuchi | Prop | 9 December 1997 (aged 27) | 13 | (Japan) Urayasu D-Rocks |
| Keijiro Tamefusa | Prop | 3 September 2001 (aged 23) | 10 | (Japan) Kubota Spears |
| Jack Cornelsen | Lock | 13 October 1994 (aged 30) | 20 | (Japan) Saitama Wild Knights |
| Warner Dearns | Lock | 11 April 2002 (aged 23) | 21 | (Japan) Toshiba Brave Lupus |
| Waisake Raratubua | Lock | 17 March 1998 (aged 27) | 0 | (Japan) Kobe Steelers |
| Vueti Tupou | Lock | 2 April 2000 (aged 25) | 0 | (Japan) Shizuoka Blue Revs |
| Epineri Uluiviti | Lock | 7 July 1996 (aged 28) | 6 | (Japan) Sagamihara DynaBoars |
| Amato Fakatava | Back row | 7 December 1994 (aged 30) | 13 | (Japan) Black Rams Tokyo |
| Ben Gunter | Back row | 24 October 1997 (aged 27) | 9 | (Japan) Saitama Wild Knights |
| Taishiro Kido | Back row | 26 July 2002 (aged 22) | 0 | (Japan) Toshiba Brave Lupus |
| Michael Leitch | Back row | 7 October 1988 (aged 36) | 87 | (Japan) Toshiba Brave Lupus |
| Faulua Makisi | Back row | 20 January 1997 (aged 28) | 15 | (Japan) Kubota Spears |
| Akito Okui | Back row | 17 September 2001 (aged 23) | 0 | (Japan) Toyota Verblitz |
| Kanji Shimokawa | Back row | 17 January 1999 (aged 26) | 14 | (Japan) Tokyo Sungoliath |
| Asahi Doei | Scrum-half | 9 January 2003 (aged 22) | 0 | (Japan) Yokohama Canon Eagles |
| Shinobu Fujiwara | Scrum-half | 8 February 1999 (aged 26) | 10 | (Japan) Kubota Spears |
| Kenta Fukuda | Scrum-half | 19 December 1996 (aged 28) | 1 | (Japan) Tokyo Sungoliath |
| Shuntaro Kitamura | Scrum-half | 28 March 2002 (aged 23) | 0 | (Japan) Shizuoka Blue Revs |
| Naoto Saitō | Scrum-half | 26 August 1997 (aged 27) | 24 | (France) Toulouse |
| Sam Greene | Fly-half | 16 August 1994 (aged 30) | 0 | (Japan) Shizuoka Blue Revs |
| Nakakusu Ichigo | Fly-half | 1 June 2000 (aged 25) | 0 | (Japan) Black Rams Tokyo |
| Kotaro Ito | Fly-half | 15 November 2001 (aged 23) | 0 | (Japan) Black Rams Tokyo |
| Lee Seung-sin | Fly-half | 13 January 2001 (aged 24) | 18 | (Japan) Kobe Steelers |
| Yuya Hirose | Centre | 7 April 2001 (aged 24) | 0 | (Japan) Kubota Spears |
| Charlie Lawrence | Centre | 27 May 1998 (aged 27) | 0 | (Japan) Sagamihara DynaBoars |
| Shōgo Nakano | Centre | 11 June 1997 (aged 28) | 7 | (Japan) Tokyo Sungoliath |
| Dylan Riley | Centre | 2 May 1997 (aged 28) | 28 | (Japan) Saitama Wild Knights |
| Siosaia Fifita | Wing | 20 December 1998 (aged 26) | 16 | (Japan) Toyota Verblitz |
| Kippei Ishida | Wing | 28 April 2000 (aged 25) | 0 | (Japan) Kobe Steelers |
| Malo Tuitama | Wing | 23 March 1996 (aged 29) | 7 | (Japan) Shizuoka Blue Revs |
| Kazuma Ueda | Wing | 4 December 2002 (aged 22) | 0 | (Japan) Yokohama Canon Eagles |
| Takurō Matsunaga | Fullback | 13 August 1998 (aged 26) | 4 | (Japan) Toshiba Brave Lupus |
| Jingo Takenoshita | Fullback | 11 June 2004 (aged 21) | 0 | (Japan) Meiji University |
| Halatoa Vailea | Fullback | 14 February 1999 (aged 26) | 0 | (Japan) Kubota Spears |

== Matches ==
=== Warm-up match ===
28 June 2025
18:00 JST (UTC+09)

| Japan XV | 20–53 | Māori All Blacks |
| Try: Ueda (2) 9' c, 32' c Con: Greene (2/2) 10', 33'; Pen: Greene (2/2) 20', 50' | Report | Try: Forbes 23' m Wrampling 28' m Eklund 35' m McWhannell 43' c Sullivan 52' c Nock 59' c Brown 66' c Hauiti-Parapara 72' m Trask 80+1' m Con: Reihana (5/9) 44', 53', 60', 67' |

Chichibunomiya Rugby Stadium, Tokyo
Referee: Karl Dickson (England)

| FB | 15 | Jingo Takenoshita |
| RW | 14 | Taira Main | (substituted off) 53' |
| OC | 13 | Siosaia Fifita | (substituted off) 25' |
| IC | 12 | Charlie Lawrence |
| LW | 11 | Kazuma Ueda |
| FH | 10 | Sam Greene |
| SH | 9 | Kenta Fukuda | (substituted off) 60' |
| N8 | 8 | Akito Okui | (substituted off) 60' |
| OF | 7 | Kanji Shimokawa (c) |
| BF | 6 | Vueti Tupou | (substituted off) 67' |
| RL | 5 | Waisake Raratubua |
| LL | 4 | Epineri Uluiviti |
| TP | 3 | Shuhei Takeuchi | (substituted off) 73' |
| HK | 2 | Hayate Era | (substituted off) 65' |
| LP | 1 | Kenta Kobayashi | (substituted off) 53' |
Substitutions:
| HK | 16 | Kenji Sato | (substituted on) 65' |
| PR | 17 | Sena Kimura | (substituted on) 53' |
| PR | 18 | Sanshiro Kihara | (substituted on) 73' |
| LK | 19 | Shu Yamamoto | (substituted on) 67' |
| FL | 20 | Taishiro Kido | (substituted on) 60' |
| SH | 21 | Shuntaro Kitamura | (substituted on) 60' |
| FH | 22 | Nakakusu Ichigo | (substituted on) 25' |
| FB | 23 | Halatoa Vailea | (substituted on) 53' |
Coach:
Neal Hatley

| FB | 15 | Zarn Sullivan | (substituted off) 60' |
| RW | 14 | Cole Forbes |
| OC | 13 | Bailyn Sullivan | (substituted off) 69' |
| IC | 12 | Gideon Wrampling |
| LW | 11 | Jonah Lowe |
| FH | 10 | Rivez Reihana |
| SH | 9 | Sam Nock | (substituted off) 60' |
| N8 | 8 | Cullen Grace |
| OF | 7 | Jahrome Brown |
| BF | 6 | TK Howden | (substituted off) 64' |
| RL | 5 | Laghlan McWhannell | (substituted off) 57' |
| LL | 4 | Isaia Walker-Leawere |
| TP | 3 | Kershawl Sykes-Martin | (substituted off) 49' |
| HK | 2 | Kurt Eklund (c) | (substituted off) 61' |
| LP | 1 | Jared Proffit | (substituted off) 53' |
Substitutions:
| HK | 16 | Jacob Devery | (substituted on) 61' |
| PR | 17 | Pouri Rakete-Stones | (substituted on) 53' |
| PR | 18 | Benet Kumeroa | (substituted on) 49' |
| LK | 19 | Zach Gallagher | (substituted on) 57' |
| FL | 20 | Caleb Delany | (substituted on) 64' |
| SH | 21 | Kemara Hauiti-Parapara | (substituted on) 60' |
| FH | 22 | Kaleb Trask | (substituted on) 60' |
| CE | 23 | Xavi Taele | (substituted on) 69' |
Coach:
Ross Filipo

Assistant referees:
Luke Pearce (England)
Damian Schneider (Argentina)
Television match official:
Ian Tempest (England)

=== First Test ===
5 July 2025
14:00 JST (UTC+09)

| Japan | 24–19 | Wales |
| Try: Matsunaga 16' c Nakakusu 59' c Vailea 70' c Con: Seung-sin (3/3) 17', 60', 71'; Pen: Seung-sin (1/1) 64' | Report | Try: Thomas 4' c Penalty try 20'; Rogers 22' m Con: Costelow (1/2) 5' |

Mikuni World Stadium, Kitakyushu
Attendance: 13,487
Referee: Damian Schneider (Argentina)

| FB | 15 | Takurō Matsunaga | | (substituted off) 19' |
| RW | 14 | Kippei Ishida |
| OC | 13 | Dylan Riley |
| IC | 12 | Shōgo Nakano |
| LW | 11 | Malo Tuitama | | (substituted off) 51' |
| FH | 10 | Lee Seung-sin |
| SH | 9 | Shinobu Fujiwara | | (substituted off) 79' |
| N8 | 8 | Amato Fakatava | | (substituted off) 56' |
| OF | 7 | Jack Cornelsen |
| BF | 6 | Michael Leitch (c) |
| RL | 5 | Warner Dearns |
| LL | 4 | Epineri Uluiviti | | (substituted off) 56' |
| TP | 3 | Shuhei Takeuchi |
| HK | 2 | Mamoru Harada |
| LP | 1 | Yota Kamimori |
Substitutions:
| HK | 16 | Hayate Era |
| PR | 17 | Sena Kimura |
| PR | 18 | Keijiro Tamefusa |
| LK | 19 | Waisake Raratubua | | (substituted on) 56' |
| FL | 20 | Ben Gunter | | (substituted on) 56' |
| SH | 21 | Shuntaro Kitamura | | (substituted on) 79' |
| FH | 22 | Ichigo Nakakusu | (yellow card) 20' | (substituted on) 19' |
| FB | 23 | Halatoa Vailea | | (substituted on) 51' |
Coach:
Eddie Jones

| FB | 15 | Blair Murray |
| RW | 14 | Tom Rogers |
| OC | 13 | Johnny Williams | (substituted off) 68' |
| IC | 12 | Ben Thomas |
| LW | 11 | Josh Adams |
| FH | 10 | Sam Costelow |
| SH | 9 | Kieran Hardy |
| N8 | 8 | Taulupe Faletau | (substituted off) 57' |
| OF | 7 | Josh Macleod | (substituted off) 57' |
| BF | 6 | Alex Mann |
| RL | 5 | Teddy Williams |
| LL | 4 | Ben Carter | (substituted off) 1' |
| TP | 3 | Keiron Assiratti | (substituted off) 51' |
| HK | 2 | Dewi Lake (c) | (substituted off) 68' |
| LP | 1 | Nicky Smith | (substituted off) 51' |
Substitutions:
| HK | 16 | Liam Belcher | (substituted on) 68' |
| PR | 17 | Gareth Thomas | (substituted on) 51' |
| PR | 18 | Archie Griffin | (substituted on) 51' |
| FL | 19 | James Ratti | (substituted on) 1' |
| FL | 20 | Aaron Wainwright | (substituted on) 57' |
| FL | 21 | Tommy Reffell | (substituted on) 57' |
| SH | 22 | Rhodri Williams |
| CE | 23 | Joe Roberts | (substituted on) 68' |
Coach:
Matt Sherratt

Player of the Match:
Mamoru Harada (Japan)

Assistant referees:
Karl Dickson (England)
Luke Pearce (England)
Television match official:
Ian Tempest (England)
Foul play review officer:
Glenn Newman (New Zealand)

Notes:

- Ichigo Nakakusu, Kippei Ishida, Yota Kamimori, Shuntaro Kitamura, Waisake Raratubua, Halatoa Vailea (all Japan) and Liam Belcher (Wales) made their international debuts.
- This was Japan's first win over a fellow tier one side since 2019, when they defeated Scotland 28–21 at the 2019 Rugby World Cup.
- With this loss, Wales dropped to 14th on the World Rugby Rankings, their lowest position since the rankings were introduced in September 2003.
- This was Eddie Jones' 56th Test match in charge of Japan, a new record for a Japan coach.

=== Second Test ===
12 July 2025
14:50 JST (UTC+09)

| Japan | 22–31 | Wales |
| Try: Takeuchi 40' c Dearns 59' m Riley 62' c Con: Seung-sin (2/3) 40+1', 63'; Pen: Seung-sin (1/1) 24' | Report | Try: Adams 9' c Hardy (2) 28' c, 36' c Edwards 75' c Con: Edwards (4/4) 10', 29', 37', 76'; Pen: Edwards (1/1) 49' |

Noevir Stadium, Kobe
Attendance: 25,074
Referee: Luke Pearce (England)

| FB | 15 | Ichigo Nakakusu | (substituted off) 56' |
| RW | 14 | Kippei Ishida |
| OC | 13 | Dylan Riley |
| IC | 12 | Shōgo Nakano |
| LW | 11 | Halatoa Vailea |
| FH | 10 | Lee Seung-sin |
| SH | 9 | Naoto Saitō | (substituted off) 56' |
| N8 | 8 | Faulua Makisi | (substituted off) 53' |
| OF | 7 | Jack Cornelsen |
| BF | 6 | Michael Leitch (c) |
| RL | 5 | Warner Dearns |
| LL | 4 | Epineri Uluiviti | (substituted off) 40' |
| TP | 3 | Keijiro Tamefusa | (substituted off) 37' |
| HK | 2 | Mamoru Harada | (substituted off) 37' |
| LP | 1 | Yota Kamimori | (substituted off) 37' |
Substitutions:
| HK | 16 | Hayate Era | (substituted on) 37' |
| PR | 17 | Sena Kimura | (substituted on) 37' |
| PR | 18 | Shuhei Takeuchi | (substituted on) 37' |
| LK | 19 | Waisake Raratubua | (substituted on) 40' |
| FL | 20 | Ben Gunter | (substituted on) 53' |
| SH | 21 | Shinobu Fujiwara | (substituted on) 56' |
| FH | 22 | Sam Greene | (substituted on) 56' |
| WG | 23 | Kazuma Ueda |
Coach:
Eddie Jones

| FB | 15 | Blair Murray |
| RW | 14 | Tom Rogers |
| OC | 13 | Johnny Williams | (substituted off) 65' |
| IC | 12 | Ben Thomas |
| LW | 11 | Josh Adams | (substituted off) 40' |
| FH | 10 | Dan Edwards |
| SH | 9 | Kieran Hardy |
| N8 | 8 | Aaron Wainwright |
| OF | 7 | Josh Macleod | (substituted off) 76' |
| BF | 6 | Alex Mann | (substituted off) 49' |
| RL | 5 | Teddy Williams |
| LL | 4 | Freddie Thomas | (substituted off) 67' |
| TP | 3 | Archie Griffin | (substituted off) 60' |
| HK | 2 | Dewi Lake (c) | (substituted off) 60' |
| LP | 1 | Nicky Smith | (substituted off) 40' |
Substitutions:
| HK | 16 | Liam Belcher | (substituted on) 60' |
| PR | 17 | Gareth Thomas | (substituted on) 40' |
| PR | 18 | Christian Coleman | (substituted on) 60' |
| FL | 19 | James Ratti | (substituted on) 67' |
| N8 | 20 | Taine Plumtree | (substituted on) 49' |
| FL | 21 | Tommy Reffell | (substituted on) 76' |
| SH | 22 | Reuben Morgan-Williams | (substituted on) 65' |
| WG | 23 | Keelan Giles | (substituted on) 40' |
Coach:
Matt Sherratt

Player of the Match:
Warner Dearns (Japan)

Assistant referees:
Karl Dickson (England)
Damian Schneider (Argentina)
Television match official:
Glenn Newman (New Zealand)
Foul play review officer:
Ian Tempest (England)

Notes:

- Hayate Era, Sam Greene, Sena Kimura (all Japan), Christian Coleman, Keelan Giles and Reuben Morgan-Williams (all Wales) made their international debuts.
- Wales ended their 18-match losing streak, winning a Test match for the first time since their 43–19 win over Georgia during the 2023 Rugby World Cup (644 days).

== See also ==
- 2025 mid-year rugby union tests
- 2025 British & Irish Lions tour to Australia
- 2025 England rugby union tour of Argentina
- 2025 France rugby union tour of New Zealand
- 2025 Italy rugby union tour of Namibia and South Africa
