= Tom Rogers (rugby union) =

Welsh rugby union player (born 1998)

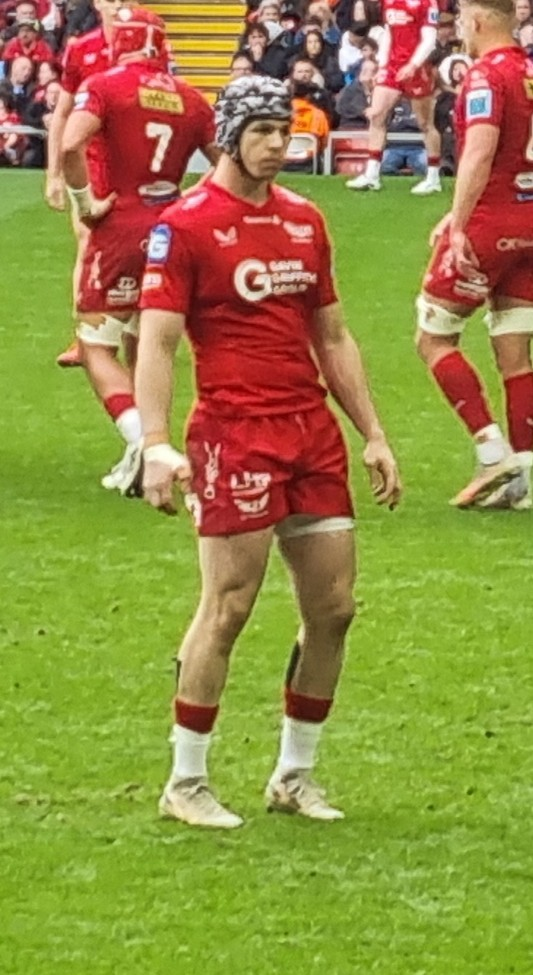
- Judgement Day 2025
- Full name: Thomas Rogers
- Born: 17 December 1998 (age 27) Carmarthen, Wales
- Height: 186 cm (6 ft 1 in)
- Weight: 94 kg (207 lb)
- School: Ysgol Maes Y Gwendraeth

Rugby union career
- Position(s): Wing, Fullback
- Current team: Ospreys
Senior career
Years	Team	Apps	(Points)
2017–2026	Scarlets	70	(95)
2026 -	Ospreys	1	(0)
- Correct as of 26th September 2026
International career
Years	Team	Apps	(Points)
2018	Wales U20	4	(10)
2019	Wales 7s	39	(60)
2021–	Wales	13	(25)
- Correct as of 18 November 2026

Thomas Rogers (born 17 December 1998) is a Welsh professional rugby union player who plays as a wing for United Rugby Championship club Ospreys and the Wales national team.

== Early life ==
Rogers attended Ysgol Maes Y Gwendraeth, and came through the ranks at local club Cefneithin RFC before transferring to nearby Tumble RFC for youth rugby from where he was picked up by Scarlets academy. Rogers made his senior rugby debut with Tumble RFC before transferring to Llanelli RFC semi-pros.

== Club career ==
=== Scarlets ===
Rogers' first appearance for the Scarlets came on 12 November 2017 against Exeter in the Anglo-Welsh Cup. Rogers made his Pro 14 debut in the away defeat to Edinburgh towards the end of the 2018 season. In February 2020, Rogers scored his first Scarlets try in a bonus point victory over the Southern Kings. In August 2020, Rogers signed a contract extension with the Scarlets.

In May 2022, Rogers extended his contract with the Scarlets. Rogers signed a further extension in February 2024.

At the end of the 2025-2026 season, Rogers signed for the Ospreys.

== International career ==
=== Wales U18 and U20 ===
In 2017, Rogers was selected for Wales U18 on their tour to South Africa.

Rogers was part of the Wales U20 squad for the 2018 Six Nations Under 20s Championship. He played in four matches, and scored against Ireland and Italy.

=== Sevens ===
Rogers also represented Wales Sevens during the 2018–19 World Rugby Sevens Series.

=== Wales ===
Rogers was called into the Wales squad for the 2021 Summer Tests against Canada and Argentina. He made his debut against Canada on 3 July 2021, and played in the second test against Argentina. On debut, Rogers became the first Cefneithin RFC player to represent Wales since Barry John.

On 1 May 2023, Rogers was called up to the Wales 54-man training squad ahead of the 2023 Rugby World Cup. Rogers started against England on 12 August 2023. Rogers was not selected in the final squad, but was selected for the uncapped friendly against Barbarian F.C. and scored a try in the match. While named in the squad for the 2024 Six Nations Championship, Rogers was released during the tournament due to injury.

Rogers was recalled to start against Australia for the second fixture of the 2024 end-of-year rugby union internationals, and named to start in the final match against South Africa but withdrew due to injury.

Retained in the squad for the 2025 Six Nations Championship, Rogers started on the wing against France and Italy, and scored his first international try in the third round fixture against Ireland. During the 2025 Autumn Nations Series, Rogers became the first player from the northern hemisphere and only the fourth player in international history to score a hat-trick against New Zealand.

Rogers was named in the squad for the 2026 Six Nations by Steve Tandy.

==== Wales International Tries ====
Try	Opposing team	Location	Venue	Competition	Date	Result
1	Ireland	Cardiff, Wales	Millennium Stadium	2025 Six Nations Championship	22 February 2025	Loss
2	Japan	Kitakyushu, Japan	Mikuni World Stadium	2025 Wales tour of Japan	5 July 2025	Loss
3	New Zealand	Cardiff, Wales	Millennium Stadium	2025 Autumn Nations Series	22 November 2025	Loss
4	New Zealand	Cardiff, Wales	Millennium Stadium	2025 Autumn Nations Series	22 November 2025	Loss
5	New Zealand	Cardiff, Wales	Millennium Stadium	2025 Autumn Nations Series	22 November 2025	Loss
