= Reuben Morgan-Williams =

Wales international rugby union player

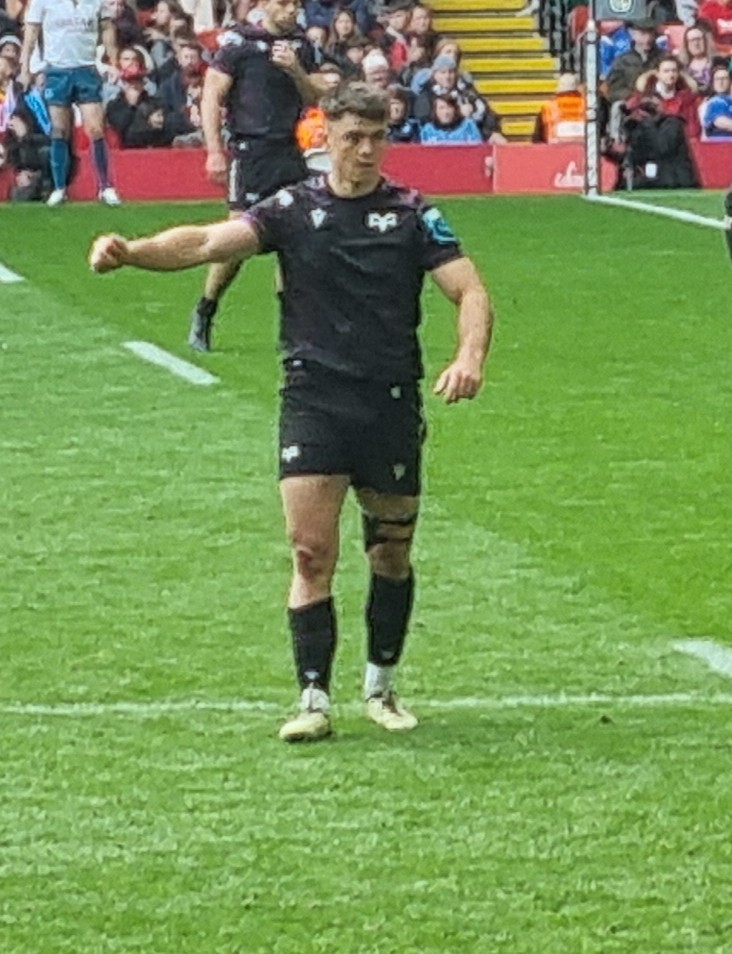
- Judgement Day 2025
- Born: Reuben Morgan-Williams; 3 February 1998 (age 28) Neath, Wales
- Height: 1.78 m (5 ft 10 in)
- Weight: 84 kg (185 lb; 13 st 3 lb)
- School: Ysgol Gyfun Ystalyfera; Neath Port Talbot College

Rugby union career
- Position: Scrum-half
- Current team: Ospreys
Senior career
| Years | Team | Apps | (Points) |
| 2017– | Ospreys | 123 | (115) |
- Correct as of 18 November 2026
International career
| Years | Team | Apps | (Points) |
| 2016–2018 | Wales U20 | 19 | (5) |
| 2025– | Wales | 2 | |
- Correct as of 18 November 2026
National sevens team
| Years | Team | | Comps |
| 2019–2022 | Wales | | 7 |

Reuben Morgan-Williams (born 3 February 1998) is a Welsh rugby union player who plays for Ospreys regional team as a scrum-half. He is a Wales under-20 international.

== Career ==
Morgan-Williams came through the Ospreys development pathway, beginning his career with feeder club Neath Athletic RFC.

Morgan-Williams made his debut for the Ospreys on 2 September 2017, coming off the bench in the win over Zebre. Morgan-Williams previously played for the Ospreys academy and Neath RFC.

A Wales U20 international, Morgan-Williams was part of the Grand Slam winning squad in the 2016 Six Nations Under 20s Championship.

In 2019, Morgan-Williams made his sevens debut, featuring for Wales in the World Rugby Sevens Series.

Morgan-Williams was selected for the 2025 Wales rugby union tour of Japan. He made his debut in the second half of the second test.

Morgan-Williams was named in the squad for the 2025 end-of-year rugby union internationals. He played against South Africa, and came on in the second half as a replacement for Keiran Hardy.

Morgan-Williams was named in the squad for the 2026 Six Nations by Steve Tandy.
