= Ben Carter (rugby union) =

Wales international rugby union player

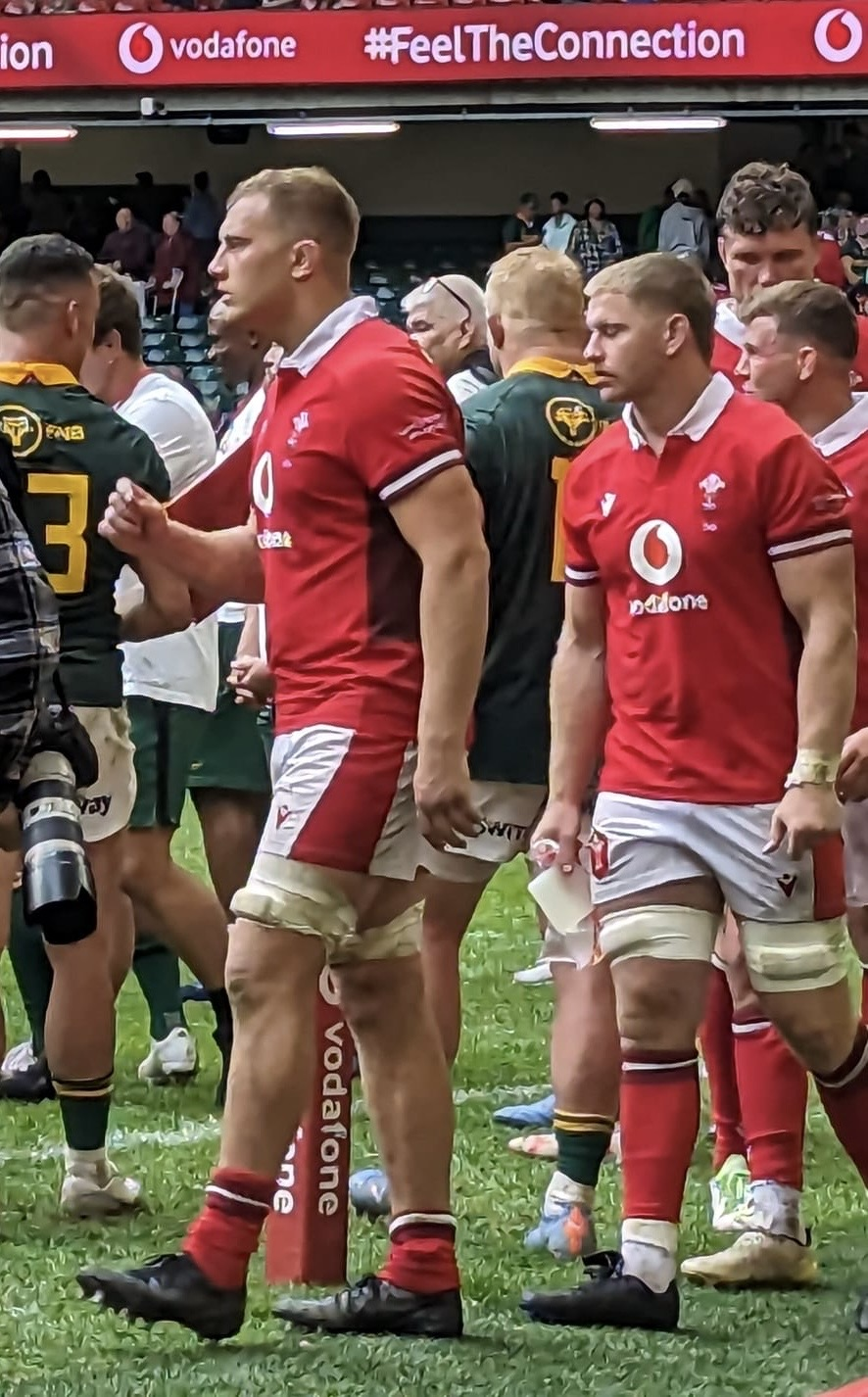
- Ben Carter South Africa 2023
- Born: 23 January 2001 (age 25) Crowborough, East Sussex, England
- Height: 1.97 m (6 ft 5 1/2 in)
- Weight: 122 kg (19 st 3 lb)
- School: Caldicot School

Rugby union career
- Position: Lock
Senior career
Years	Team	Apps	(Points)
2020–	Dragons	66	(5)
- Correct as of 18 November 2026
International career
Years	Team	Apps	(Points)
2020	Wales U20s	5	(0)
2021–	Wales	19	(0)
- Correct as of 18 November 2026

Ben Carter (born 23 January 2001) is a Welsh rugby union player who plays as a lock for United Rugby Championship side Dragons and the Wales national team.

== Club career ==
Carter was named in the Dragons first-team squad for the 2020–21 Pro14. He made his Dragons debut in Round 4 of the 2020–21 Pro14 against Munster.

== International ==
Carter has captained Wales at both U18 and U19 level and represented the country at the 2020 U20 Six Nations. Following impressive displays for the Dragons, Carter was called up to the senior Wales squad for the 2021 Summer Internationals, despite still being young enough to play for the Under-20 side, with Wales coach Wayne Pivac comparing the young Carter to Wales captain Alun Wyn Jones. Carter made his debut in the 68-12 win over Canada in a performance that saw him named man of the match. Carter made his Six Nations debut on 5 February 2022 against Ireland, coming on as a second-half substitute for Will Rowlands.

In October 2022, Carter was named in the squad for the autumn tour. He played three of the four tests, including the historic defeat to Georgia.

In November 2023, Carter start for Wales against the Barbarians. June 2024 saw Carter start in an international friendly against South Africa.

Carter was selected for the 2025 Wales rugby union tour of Japan. He started the first test, but left the game in the first minute due to a head injury. Carter was also named in the squad for 2025 end-of-year rugby union internationals. He started against South Africa and played the whole match.

Carter was named in the squad for the 2026 Six Nations by Steve Tandy.
