= Christian Coleman (rugby union) =

Welsh rugby union player (born 1998)

- Born: Christian Coleman; 31 August 1998 (age 28) Newport, Wales
- Height: 188 cm (6 ft 2 in)
- Weight: 125 kg (19 st 10 lb)
- School: St Alban's Roman Catholic High School

Rugby union career
- Position: Prop
- Current team: Dragons
Senior career
Years	Team	Apps	(Points)
2018–	Dragons	94	(20)
International career
Years	Team	Apps	(Points)
2017–2018	Wales U20	7	(10)
2025–	Wales	2	(0)

Christian Coleman (born 31 August 1998) is a Welsh rugby union player who plays as a prop for the Dragons and the Welsh national team.

== Club career ==
=== Dragons ===
Coleman played for a Dragons Premiership Select team in the 2017 British and Irish Cup having previously played for the Dragons academy, Cross Keys RFC, Newport RFC and Garndiffaith RFC. He made his competitive debut on 28 April 2018 against the Scarlets in the annual Judgement Day fixture.

In early 2021, Coleman signed an extension with the Dragons, and agreed to a further extension in 2022.

== International career ==
=== Wales U20 ===
Coleman was selected by Wales U20 for the 2017 Six Nations Under 20s Championship and 2018 World Rugby Under 20 Championship.

=== Wales ===
Coleman was named in the squad for the 2025 Wales rugby union tour of Japan. He made his debut in the second test. He was also selected for the 2025 end-of-year rugby union internationals. He came on as a substitute in the loss to South Africa.
