= Josh Macleod =

Welsh rugby union player

- Born: Joshua Macleod; 26 October 1996 (age 30) Monte Carlo, Monaco
- Height: 188 cm (6 ft 2 in)
- Weight: 104 kg (16 st 5 lb; 229 lb)
- School: Ysgol Bro Gwaun

Rugby union career
- Position: Flanker
- Current team: Scarlets
Senior career
Years	Team	Apps	(Points)
2015–2018	Llanelli RFC	13	(15)
2016–	Scarlets	134	(70)
- Correct as of 20:44, 21 May 2025 (UTC)
International career
Years	Team	Apps	(Points)
2016	Wales U20	3	(0)
2022–	Wales	5	(0)
- Correct as of 20 November 2022

Josh Macleod (born 27 October 1996) is a Welsh rugby union player who plays as a back row forward for the Scarlets. He has been capped for both Wales U20 and Wales.

== Early life ==
Macleod was born in Monte Carlo in Monaco as his parents were living and working there at the time. His father had been a fisherman in the Outer Hebrides before moving to Monaco to skipper yachts. When Macleod was five years old, the family moved to the Pembrokeshire village of Dinas Cross, to be near his great-grandparents. Macleod went to Ysgol Bro Gwaun in Fishguard, but the town did not have any age-grade rugby programme at the time, so he had to play further afield. After playing a game for Cardigan at the age of 8, he was invited to play for Crymych RFC, where he stayed until the age of 16.

== Club career ==
=== Scarlets ===
Macleod made his debut for the Scarlets Under-16s in the 2012–13 season, followed soon after by the Wales U16 squad. He subsequently played for Crymych RFC.

Macleod made his debut for Llanelli RFC against Pontypridd in September 2015. After making three further appearances that season, scoring two tries in the process, Macleod went on to make his Scarlets debut against Munster.

At the end of the 2018–19 season, Macleod was voted the Scarlets "D Machine" as their best defensive player. The following season, he created 23 turnovers for the Scarlets in the Pro14, winning the competition's Turnover King award for 2019–20.

Macleod was named as the Scarlets' captain for the 2023–24 season, taking over from Jonathan Davies, and retained the role for 2024–25.

At the end of the 2024–25 season, Macleod was named as the Coaches’ Player of the Season.

In 2026, Macleod was chair of the Welsh Rugby Players Association.

== International career ==
=== Wales U20 ===
Macleod represented the Wales U20 team in 2016, making three appearances for the side and featuring in the 2016 Six Nations Under 20s Championship.

=== Wales ===
On 6 October 2020, Macleod was named in the senior Wales squad for the 2020 Autumn Nations Cup. Macleod was injured prior to the campaign and did not play.

On 20 January he was named in the senior Wales squad for the 2021 Six Nations campaign. He was named in the Wales team to play Scotland, but was injured in training and unable to make his debut.

Macleod was named in the Wales squad for the 2022 Autumn series.

On 19 November 2022, Macleod made his long-awaited debut, starting at number 8 against Georgia.

Macleod was selected by Wales for the first time in nearly three years, for the 2025 Wales rugby union tour of Japan. He started both tests, as Wales eventually ended their 18-match losing streak.

Macleod was named in the squad for the 2026 Six Nations by Steve Tandy.
