= Ben Thomas (rugby union) =

Wales international rugby union footballer

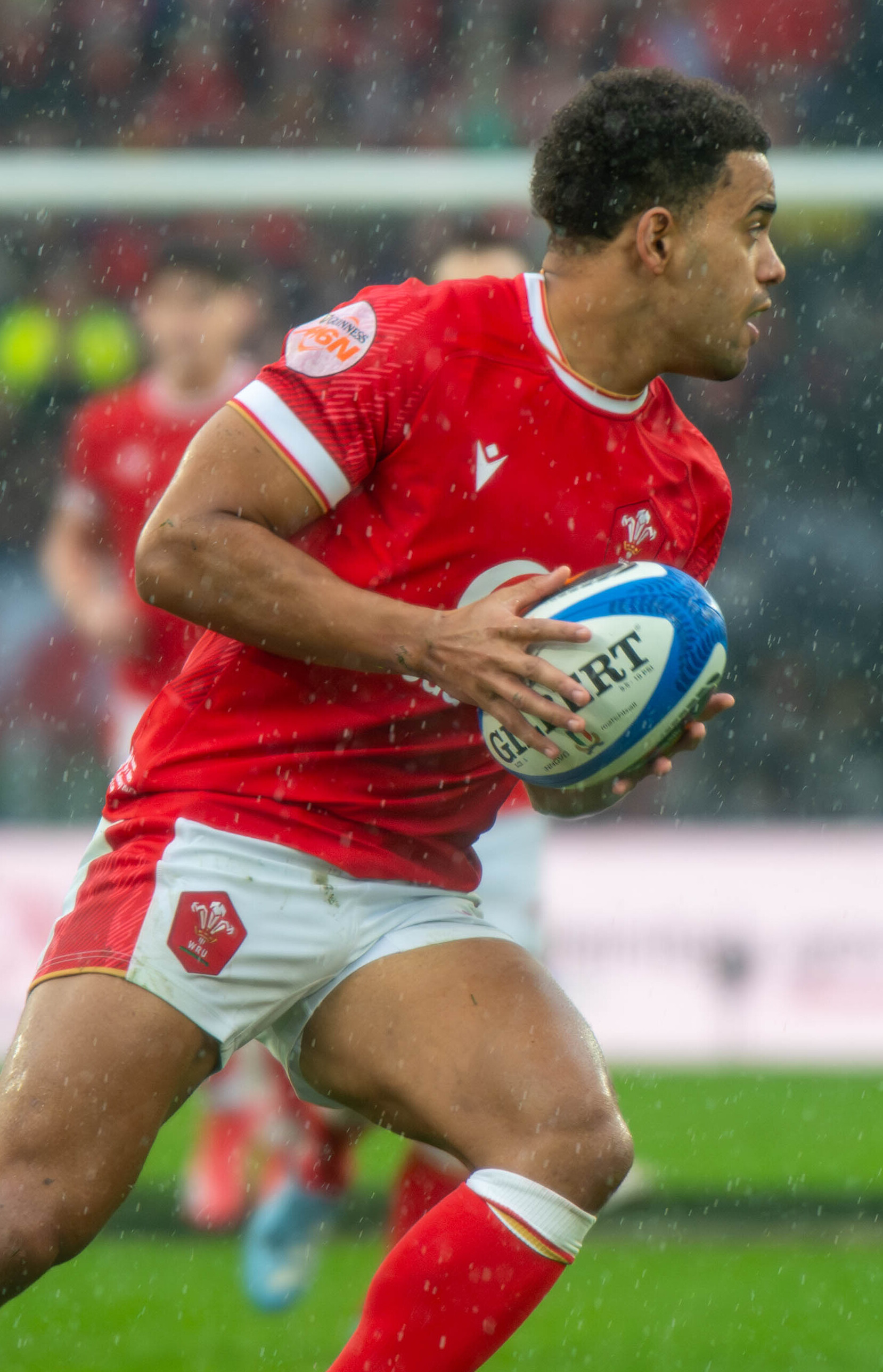
- Born: Ben Thomas; 25 November 1998 (age 27) Cardiff, Wales
- Height: 183 cm (6 ft 0 in)
- Weight: 91 kg (201 lb; 14 st 5 lb)

Rugby union career
- Position(s): Inside Centre; Fly Half
- Current team: Cardiff Rugby
Senior career
| Years | Team | Apps | (Points) |
| 2016–2019 | Cardiff RFC | 38 | (127) |
| 2019– | Cardiff Rugby | 119 | (158) |
- Correct as of 17 July 2026
International career
| Years | Team | Apps | (Points) |
| 2018 | Wales U20 | 7 | (0) |
| 2021– | Wales | 19 | (49) |
- Correct as of 17 July 2026

Ben Thomas (born 25 November 1998) is a Welsh rugby union player who plays for Cardiff Rugby and the Wales national team as a centre and occasionally fly-half.

== Early life ==
Thomas attended Cardiff and Vale College and was the first captain of the academy team. He was part of the Cardiff Academy for the 2017–18 season, and retained for the 2018–19 season. Despite developing as a 10, Thomas switched to inside centre ahead of the 2018–19 season. Following a successful transition, Thomas was named Best Newcomer in the Premiership after helping Cardiff RFC claim the National Cup, the club's first silverware since 2009.

== Professional career ==
=== Cardiff ===
Thomas made his Cardiff debut on 16 November 2019 against Calvisano. Thomas made his first start on 7 December 2019, scoring a try and subsequently named Man of the Match.

Thomas signed an extension with Cardiff on 25 July 2023, and agreed to a further extension on 18 December 2024.

During the 2023–24 season, Thomas captained Cardiff for two fixtures in South Africa.

Thomas was awarded the "The Peter Thomas Player of the Season" at the end of the 2025-26 season.

== International career ==
=== Wales U18 and U20 ===
In 2017, Thomas represented Wales U18 in the Under 19 International Series, featuring in wins over South Africa Schools and England U18.

Thomas was selected for Wales U20 for the 2018 Six Nations Under 20s Championship, coming off the bench in the opening match against Scotland, before starting against England at inside centre.

Thomas was later selected by Wales U20 for the 2018 World Rugby Under 20 Championship.

=== Wales ===
On 7 June 2021 Thomas received his first call up for the senior Wales team for the 2021 Summer Internationals, replacing Callum Sheedy at fly-half in the second half of the match against Canada to win his first cap. Thomas scored his first international try on 17 November 2024, against Australia.

Thomas was named in the squad for the 2025 end-of-year rugby union internationals. He received a yellow card in the match against Argentina for a kicking motion towards a player's head as he exited the ruck.

Thomas was named in the squad for the 2026 Six Nations by Steve Tandy.

== Personal life ==
Thomas is the son of British light-middleweight boxing champion Pat Thomas.
