= James Ratti =

Wales international rugby union player (born 1997)

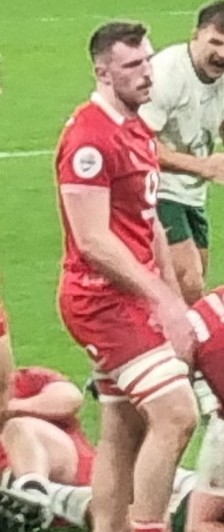
- 2025 Autumn Nations Series Wales vs South Africa
- Born: 14 October 1997 (age 29) Swansea, Wales
- Height: 193 cm (6 ft 4 in)
- Weight: 117 kg (18 st 6 lb; 258 lb)
- School: Llandovery College; Gower College Swansea; Bishopston Comprehensive

Rugby union career
- Position(s): Lock; Number 8
- Current team: Ospreys
Youth career
- Dunvant RFC
Senior career
Years	Team	Apps	(Points)
2017–2018	Ospreys	13	(0)
2018–2023	Cardiff	59	(25)
2023–	Ospreys	63	(25)
- Correct as of 13 August 2026
International career
Years	Team	Apps	(Points)
2016–2017	Wales U20	0	(0)
2024–	Wales	4	(0)
- Correct as of 22 June 2024

James Ratti (born 14 October 1997) is a Welsh rugby union player who plays as a back row or lock for the Ospreys and Wales national team.

== Early life ==
Ratti began his career with the Dunvant RFC youth side, playing as a number eight. He played for Bishopston, Llandovery College, and Gower College.

== Club career ==
=== Ospreys ===
Ratti made his debut for the Ospreys in 2018 against Zebre having previously played for the Ospreys academy and Aberavon RFC. Ratti was released from the Ospreys following the 2018–19 Pro14 season.

=== Cardiff ===
Following his release by the Ospreys was subsequently picked up by Cardiff RFC on a professional contract allowing him to train full-time with Cardiff. While with Cardiff, Ratti focused on playing in the back row, his original position, a move from the second row where he primarily featured with the Ospreys. Ratti made his debut for Cardiff in November 2019, against Calvisano. On 21 January 2020, Ratti signed an extension with Cardiff. He made his 50th appearance for the club on 21 January 2023 against Brive.

Ratti departed Cardiff at the end of the 2022–23 United Rugby Championship season.

=== Ospreys ===
Ratti rejoined the Ospreys ahead of the 2023–24 United Rugby Championship. In 2025, Ratti signed an extension with the Ospreys.

== International career ==
=== Wales U20 ===
Ratti was named on the bench against Scotland U20 in the 2016 Six Nations Under 20s Championship, but did not make an appearance.

Ratti was selected for Wales U20 for the 2017 Six Nations Under 20s Championship.

=== Wales ===
He was called up to the senior Wales squad for the 2022 Six Nations Championship. He was again selected for Wales for the 2022 Wales rugby union tour of South Africa, but did not earn his first cap.

Ratti initially missed out on selection for the 2024 Wales rugby union tour of Australia, but following injuries within the team, he was added to the squad ahead of the first match against South Africa. Ratti made his international debut on 22 June 2024, coming off the bench in the second half.

Ratti was selected for the 2025 Wales rugby union tour of Japan, coming off the bench in both tests. He was called up for the final fixture of the 2025 end-of-year rugby union internationals.
