= George Nott =

Welsh rugby union player

- Born: George Nott; 21 January 1996 (age 30) Bodelwyddan, Wales
- Height: 1.98 m (6 ft 6 in)
- Weight: 118 kg (18 st 8 lb)
- School: King's School, Chester

Rugby union career
- Position(s): Lock, Flanker
- Current team: Cardiff Rugby
Senior career
Years	Team	Apps	(Points)
2014–2019	Sale Sharks	36	(0)
2013–2016	→ Chester	28	(10)
2016–2017	→ Fylde	8	(5)
2019–2022	London Irish	62	(5)
2022–2025	Dragons	42	(0)
2025-	Cardiff	5	(0)
International career
Years	Team	Apps	(Points)
2014	England U18		
2016	England U20	9	(5)

George David Nott (born 21 January 1996) is a professional rugby union player who plays as a lock or flanker for Cardiff Rugby having been signed from Dragons RFC in June 2025. Born in Bodelwyddan, Wales, Nott was raised in Llandudno and Mold, and has represented England at Under-20 level.

== Career ==
Nott started all five games for the England under-20 team that hosted the 2016 World Rugby Under 20 Championship including the victory against Ireland in the final.

He came through the academy at Sale and made his professional club debut in a European Rugby Champions Cup defeat away to Munster on 25 January 2015. Nott made his Premiership debut in February 2017 against the Newcastle Falcons and made a total of 36 senior appearances for the Sharks.

In August 2019, it was announced that he would be joining London Irish.

He left the club to join the United Rugby Championship's Dragons ahead of the 2022–23 season. As at Sale, he made his debut against Munster, this time finishing on the winning side as the Dragons won their first home game for 17 months in a 23-17 win.

Nott joined regional rivals Cardiff Rugby for the 2025–26 United Rugby Championship season. He made his debut on 11 October 2025 against Connacht.
