= Keiron Assiratti =

Welsh rugby union player

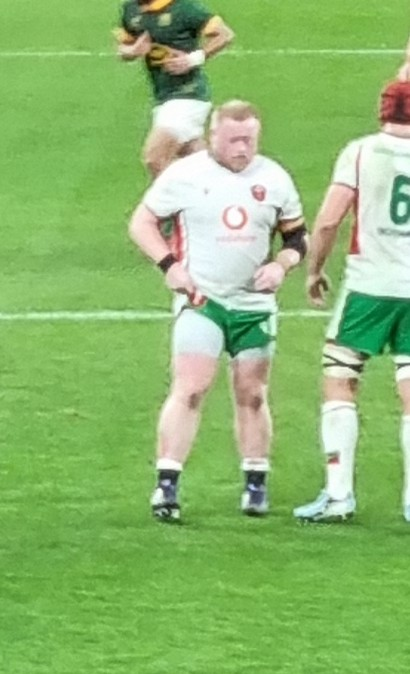
- Keiron Assiratti at Wales vs South Africa game (2024 end-of-year rugby union internationals)
- Born: 30 June 1997 (age 29) Wattstown, Wales
- Height: 1.78 m (5 ft 10 in)
- Weight: 119 kg (262 lb; 18 st 10 lb)
- School: Porth Community School

Rugby union career
- Position: Tighthead Prop
- Current team: Cardiff
Senior career
Years	Team	Apps	(Points)
2016–	Cardiff	98	(10)
2020	→ Bristol Bears (loan)	2	(0)
- Correct as of 10 March 2024
International career
Years	Team	Apps	(Points)
2016–2017	Wales U20	11	(5)
2023–	Wales	19	(0)
- Correct as of 10 March 2024

Keiron Assiratti (born 30 June 1997) is a Welsh professional rugby union player who plays as a prop for United Rugby Championship club Cardiff and the Wales national team.

== Club career ==
Assiratti made his debut for Cardiff in 2017 having previously played for the Cardiff academy.

In August 2020 it was confirmed Assiratti had joined Premiership Rugby side Bristol Bears on a short-term loan for the remainder of the 2019–20 season.

== International career ==
On 1 May 2023, Warren Gatland selected him in Wales' 54 player training squad for the 2023 Rugby World Cup.

Assiratti made his debut on 5 August 2023, starting for Wales in the first test of their 2023 Rugby World Cup warm-up matches, in a win against England.

The 2024 Six Nations saw Assiratti selected by Warren Gatland. He started against England, Ireland, and France.

Assiratti was named in the squad for the 2025 end-of-year rugby union internationals. He started the matches against Argentina, South Africa, and New Zealand. He was named a substitute against Japan, and came on in the second-half.

Assiratti was named in the squad for the 2026 Six Nations by Steve Tandy. He was subsequently released due to a calf injury sustained in the match against Benetton.
