= Dan Edwards (rugby union) =

Wales international rugby union player

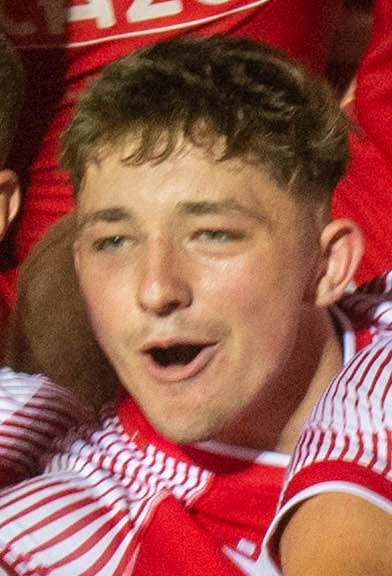
- Full name: Daniel David Edwards
- Born: 7 May 2003 (age 23) Port Talbot, Wales
- Height: 178 cm (5 ft 10 in)
- Weight: 83 kg (183 lb; 13 st 1 lb)
- School: Ysgol Ystalyfera

Rugby union career
- Position: Fly-half
- Current team: Ospreys
Youth career
- Cwmafan RFC
- Aberavon RFC
Senior career
Years	Team	Apps	(Points)
2023–	Ospreys	56	(374)
- Correct as of 18 November 2026
International career
Years	Team	Apps	(Points)
2021–2023	Wales U20	17	(101)
2025–	Wales	13	(85)
- Correct as of 18 November 2026

Daniel Edwards (born 7 May 2003) is a Welsh rugby union fly-half who plays for the Ospreys in the United Rugby Championship.

== Club career ==
He began his career at Cwmafan RFC, he also played for Swansea Valley U15 team in the Dewar Shield. He joined the Ospreys in 2021, while at the URC side he also went and played for Aberavon RFC and Swansea RFC. At the end of the 2021-22 season at Aberavon he won the Young Player of the Year award as well as the gong for the Most Improved Player.

After being named on the bench against Glasgow Warriors in Round 4 of the URC but not featuring, Edwards went on the make his debut in Round 6 scoring a try against the Scarlets.

Edwards re-signed with the Ospreys in January 2026. This came amidst uncertainty about whether the Ospreys would be cut altogether in the WRU's plans to reduce the number of professional men's teams in Wales.

== International career ==
He made his debut for the Welsh under-20 side in the first round of the 2022 U20 Six Nations, starting at Fly-half against Ireland. He started all of Wales' games in the 2023 U20 Six Nations, and played in the 2023 World Rugby U20 Championship.

On 31 January 2025, he made his senior debut against France in the opening game of the 2025 Six Nations, coming off the bench following an injury to Owen Watkin. Later in the year, on 12 July 2025, he scored his first international try against Japan on the 2025 tour of Japan in the 76' minute of the game, later converting the try.

Edwards was named in the squad for the 2026 Six Nations by Steve Tandy. He started against England, converting Wales' only try, scored by Josh Adams. He also started against France, converting a try scored by Rhys Carré in the first half. Edwards was not selected to play against Scotland, but returned against Ireland, again converting both Wales' tries, and kicking a successful penalty. Against Italy, Edwards converted all the tries Wales scored, including his own. He also kicked a drop goal in the second half. The bonus-point win over Italy broke Wales' three-year losing streak in the Six Nations.

=== International tries ===
Try	Opponent	Location	Competition	Date	Result
1	Japan	Noevir Stadium Kobe, Kobe	2025 Wales tour of Japan	12 July 2025	Won
2	Japan	Millennium Stadium, Cardiff	2025 Autumn Internationals	15 November 2025	Won
3	Italy	Millennium Stadium, Cardiff	2026 Six Nations Championship	14 March 2026	Won
