= Dewi Lake =

Wales international rugby union player

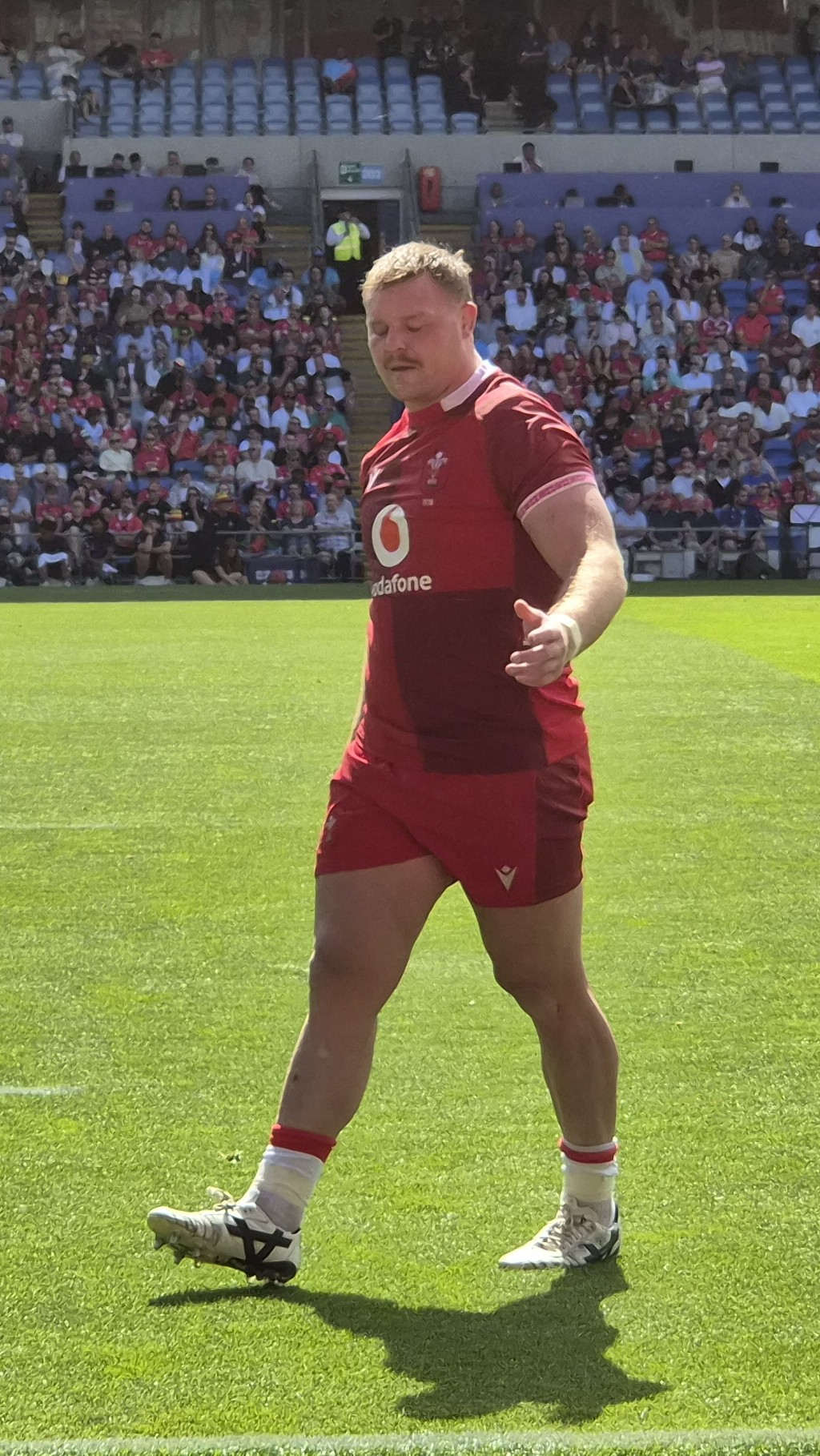
- Full name: Dewi Lake
- Born: 16 May 1999 (age 27) Bridgend, Wales
- Height: 185 cm (6 ft 1 in)
- Weight: 114 kg (251 lb; 17 st 13 lb)

Rugby union career
- Position: Hooker
- Current team: Gloucester
Youth career
- Bridgend Ravens
Senior career
Years	Team	Apps	(Points)
2017–2026	Ospreys	77	(110)
2026–	Gloucester	5	(10)
- Correct as of 18 November 2026
International career
Years	Team	Apps	(Points)
2018–2019	Wales U20	10	(10)
2022–	Wales	37	(55)
- Correct as of 18 November 2026

Dewi Lake is a Welsh rugby union player, who plays for Gloucester and Wales as a hooker. Lake made his international debut against Ireland in the 2022 Six Nations Championship. He is a fluent Welsh speaker.

== Club career ==
=== Youth rugby ===
Before focusing on rugby, Lake participated in gymnastics, representing Wales as a schoolboy. Lake first played for Bridgend Ravens and Neath RFC at youth level, before joining the Ospreys academy as a back row. Shortly after his arrival, Lake was converted to hooker.

=== Ospreys ===
Lake made his Ospreys debut in 2018 against Zebre. Lake scored his first Ospreys try in the Round 6 meeting with Munster on 15 November 2020, before scoring his second try against Benetton the following week.

On 1 March 2021, Lake signed a new two year deal to remain with the Ospreys.

On 20 January 2023, Lake scored the Ospreys first try against Leicester Tigers as they secured their place in the knockout rounds of the 2022–23 European Rugby Champions Cup. He suffered a knee injury during the match, which ruled him out of the 2023 Six Nations Championship.

Lake made his return to fitness in time for the round of 16 match against the Saracens, coming off the bench in the 35–20 loss. Shortly after, he signed an extension with the Ospreys.

Lake signed a further extension in January 2025.

In December 2025, Lake signed for Premiership Rugby club Gloucester ahead of the 2026–27 season. His contract with Ospreys was due end at the end of the 2025–26 season. The decision came with the uncertainty that the team could be cut altogether, as WRU looked to reduce the number of professional teams from four to three.

=== Gloucester ===
Lake was named captain for Gloucester ahead of the 2026–27 season. He scored two tries in the first match of their season against Exeter, which Gloucester went on to win 24-45. Lake was awarded player of the match.

== International career ==
=== Wales U20 ===
Capped at Wales under-20 level for the first time in 2018, Lake was selected to captain the side at the 2019 World Rugby Championship. During the tournament Lake captained Wales to an 8-7 victory over New Zealand, only the second under-20 victory over the age grade All Blacks.

=== Wales ===
Lake received his first call to the senior Wales squad for the 2020 Six Nations, although he would not make any appearances at the tournament. Lake would next be called up ahead of the 2022 Six Nations. Lake made his senior debut in the opening test against Ireland, appearing as a replacement in the second half. Lake would appear in all 5 games of the tournament, including a start in the final game, a defeat to Italy at the Principality Stadium. During the match, Lake scored his first test try.

Lake featured off the bench in all three of the tests during the 2022 Wales rugby union tour of South Africa, scoring a try in the first match, and contributing to the historic win in the second test.

A shoulder injury ruled Lake out of the 2022 end-of-year rugby union internationals, while he missed the 2023 Six Nations with a knee injury, before returning for the World Cup and being named co-captain.

In the 2025 end-of-year rugby union internationals, Lake captained the team after Jac Morgan was recalled due to injury.

Lake was named captain of the squad for the 2026 Six Nations by Steve Tandy. He received a yellow card in the seven-try defeat to England, one of four shown to Wales by the referee Pierre Brousset.

Ahead of the match against the Barbarians in June, Lake was named captain of the squad. Lake was again named captain ahead of the 2026 Nations Championship.

On 14 November 2026, Lake became the first Wales captain since 1953 to lead his team to victory over New Zealand. He scored a try in the 35–28 win, helping end Wales' 34-match losing streak against New Zealand.

=== International tries ===
Try	Opponent	Location	Venue	Competition	Date	Result
1	Italy	Cardiff, Wales	Millennium Stadium	2022 Six Nations	19 March 2022	Loss
2	South Africa	Pretoria, South Africa	Loftus Versfeld Stadium	2022 Summer Internationals	2 July 2022	Loss
3	Portugal	Nice, France	Allianz Riviera Stadium	2023 World Cup	16 September 2023	Win
4	South Africa	London, England	Twickenham Stadium	2024 Summer Internationals	22 June 2024	Loss
5	Australia	Melbourne, Australia	Melbourne Rectangular Stadium	2024 Summer Internationals	13 July 2024	Loss
6	Australia	Melbourne, Australia	Melbourne Rectangular Stadium	2024 Summer Internationals	13 July 2024	Loss
7	Argentina	Cardiff, Wales	Millennium Stadium	2025 Autumn Internationals	9 November 2025	Loss
8	Italy	Cardiff, Wales	Millennium Stadium	2026 Six Nations	14 March 2026	Win
9	Argentina	San Juan, Argentina	Estadio San Juan del Bicentenario	2026 Nations Championship	11 July 2026	Loss
10	New Zealand	Cardiff, Wales	Millennium Stadium	2026 Nations Championship	14 November 2026	Win
11	Australia	Cardiff, Wales	Millennium Stadium	2026 Nations Championship	21 November 2026	Loss
12	Australia	Cardiff, Wales	Millennium Stadium	2026 Nations Championship	21 November 2026	Loss
