= Mikuni World Stadium Kitakyushu =

Stadium in Kitakyushu, Japan

- ミクニワールドスタジアム北九州
- Kitakyushu Stadium
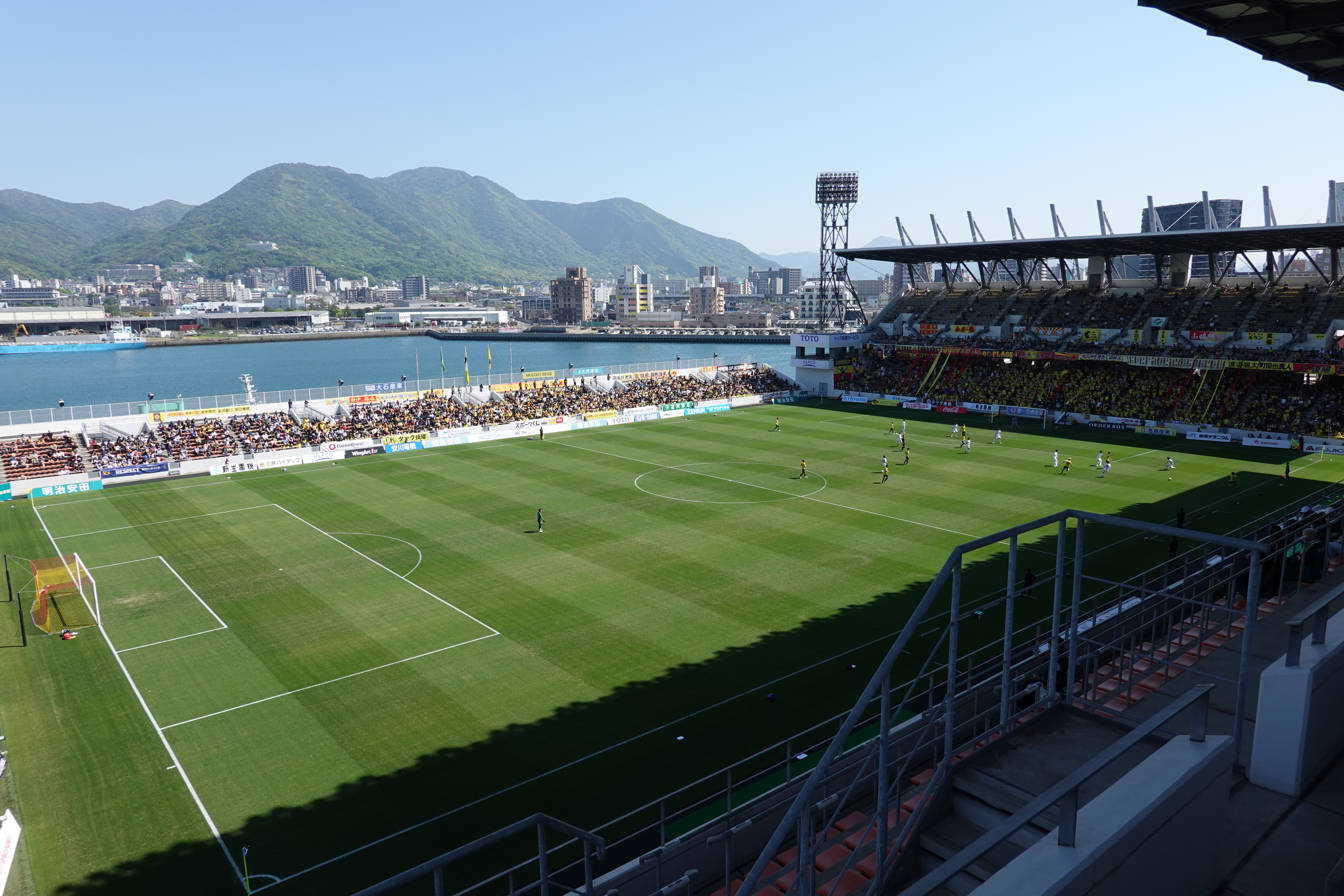
- View of field in 2025.
- Interactive map of Mikuni World Stadium Kitakyushu
- Address: 3 Chome-9-33 Asano, Kokurakita Ward, Kitakyushu, Fukuoka 802-0001
- Coordinates: 33°53′28″N 130°53′19″E
- Owner: City of Kitakyushu
- Operator: Mizuno; NSK
- Capacity: 15,460
- Surface: Grass
- Field size: 140 m × 78 m (459 ft × 256 ft)
- Field shape: Rectangular
- Public transit: Kokura Station; Kokura Station; Tanga Station

Construction
- Groundbreaking: 16 April 2015
- Built: 2015–2017
- Opened: 18 February 2017; 9 years ago
- Years active: 2017–present
- Cost: ¥9.9 billion (US$87.5 million)
- Builder: Windship Kitakyushu Co. Ltd.

Tenants
- J3 League Giravanz Kitakyushu (2017–present) Other Japan national rugby union team (select matches)

Mikuni World Stadium Kitakyushu (ミクニワールドスタジアム北九州), often known colloquially as Kitakyushu Stadium, is a stadium located in the city of Kitakyushu in Fukuoka Prefecture, Japan. The stadium was built between 2015 and 2017, being officially opened in February 2017. Construction for the stadium cost ¥9.9 billion (US$87.5 million), with the overall cost for the stadium site costing ¥11.5 billion (US$101.7 million). The stadium has an official capacity of 15,460. The stadium is situated on the northern coast of Kyushu island and oversees the Kanmon Straits, the stretch of water that sits between Kyushu and Honshu.

The stadium, being rectangular in shape, hosts both football and rugby matches, and is the official stadium for J3 League football team Giravanz Kitakyushu.

On 16 September 2019 the Welsh national rugby team practiced at the stadium in front of a full crowd: officially 15,300 seated, with more standing. This was a pre-event for the 2019 Rugby World Cup (RWC) that was held in Japan.

Although no rugby team uses the stadium as an official venue, it has played host to various teams from the Japan Rugby League One (JRLO), and, since 2022, has been a venue used by the Japan rugby team.

== Japan Test matches ==
Date	Home	Score	Away	Attendance	Competition	Ref.
25 June 2022	Japan	43–7	Uruguay	11,664	2022 Uruguay tour of Japan	
5 July 2025	Japan	24–19	Wales	13,487	2025 Wales tour of Japan	

== Gallery ==
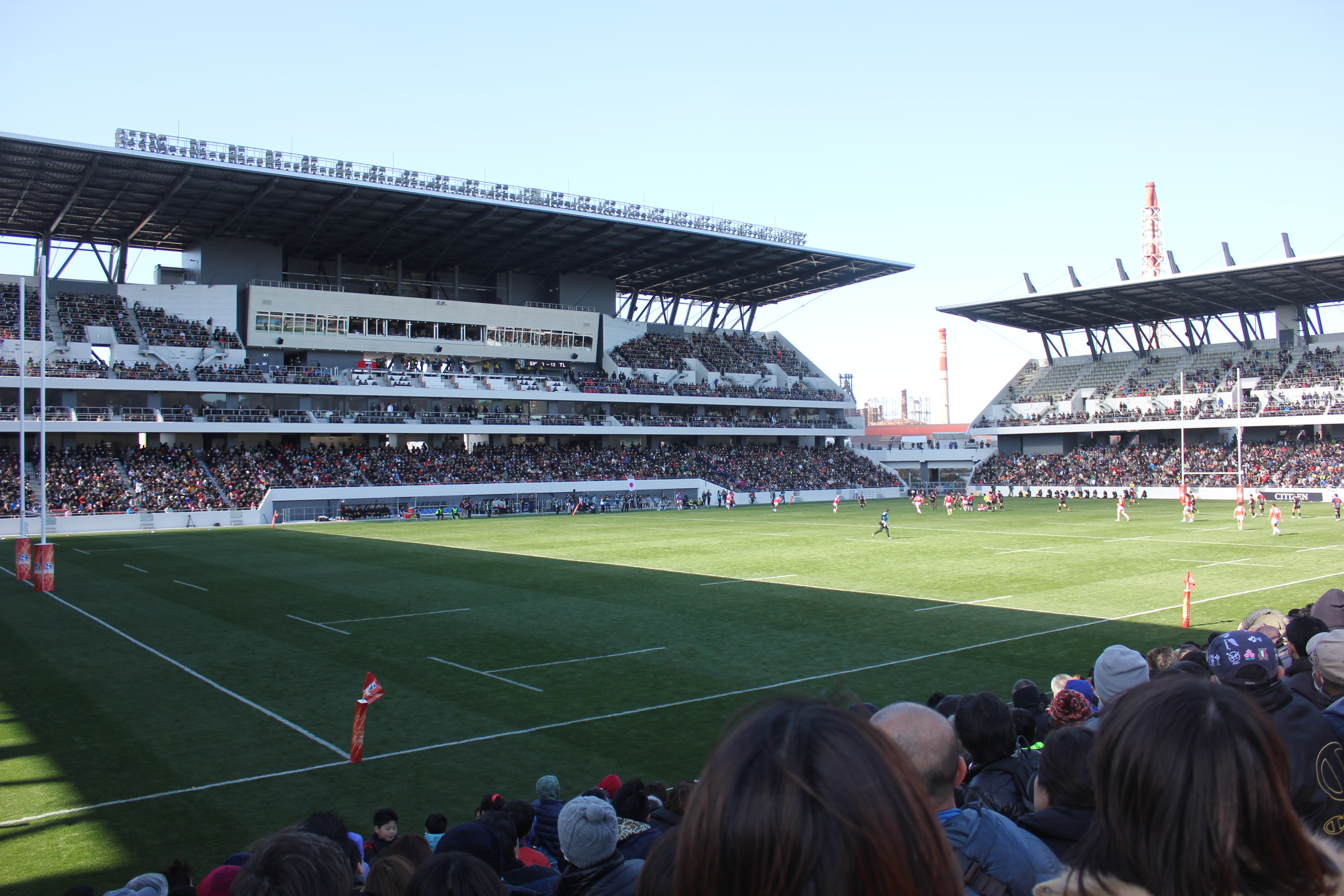
Rugby match, 2017

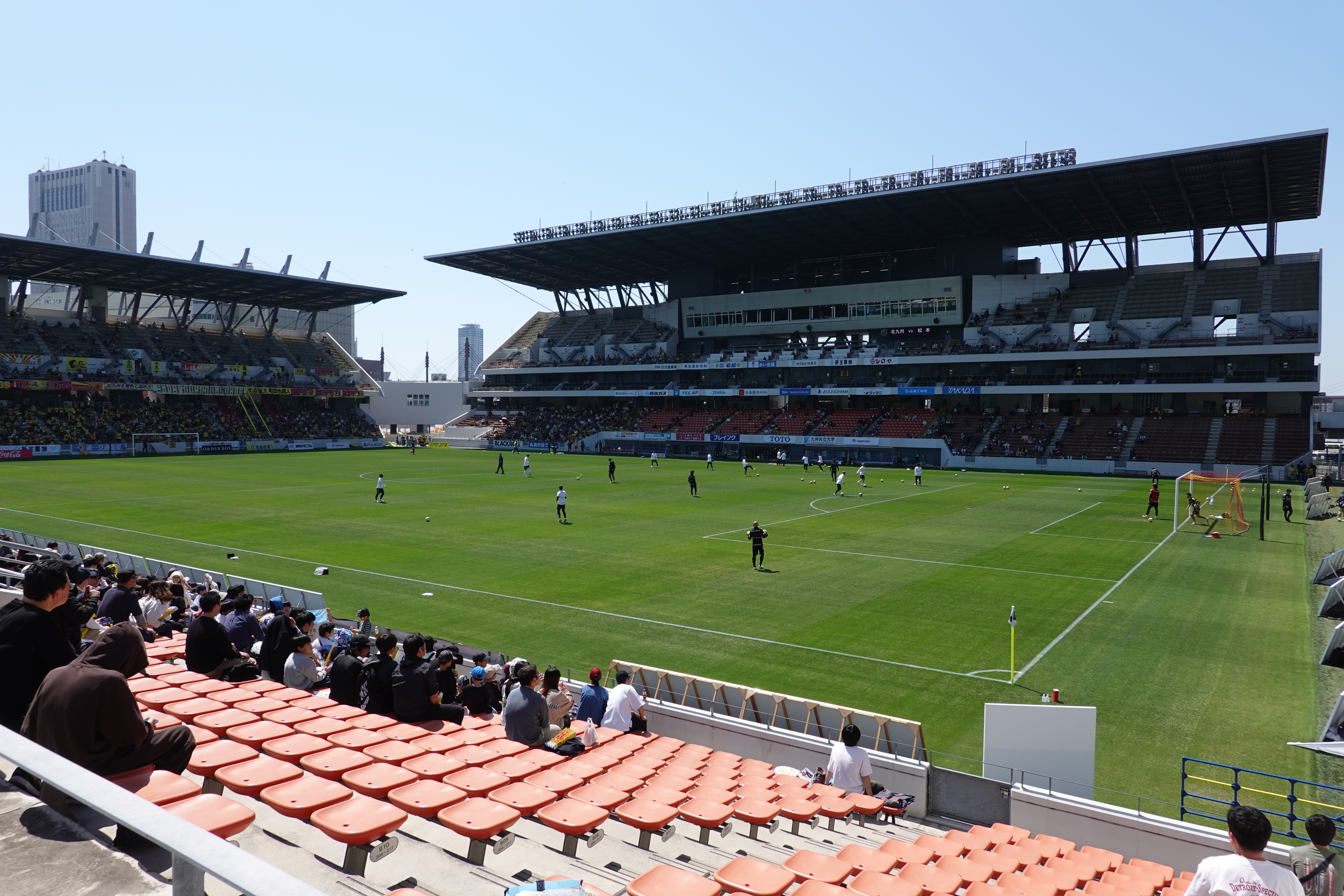
Giravanz Kitakyushu match, 2025

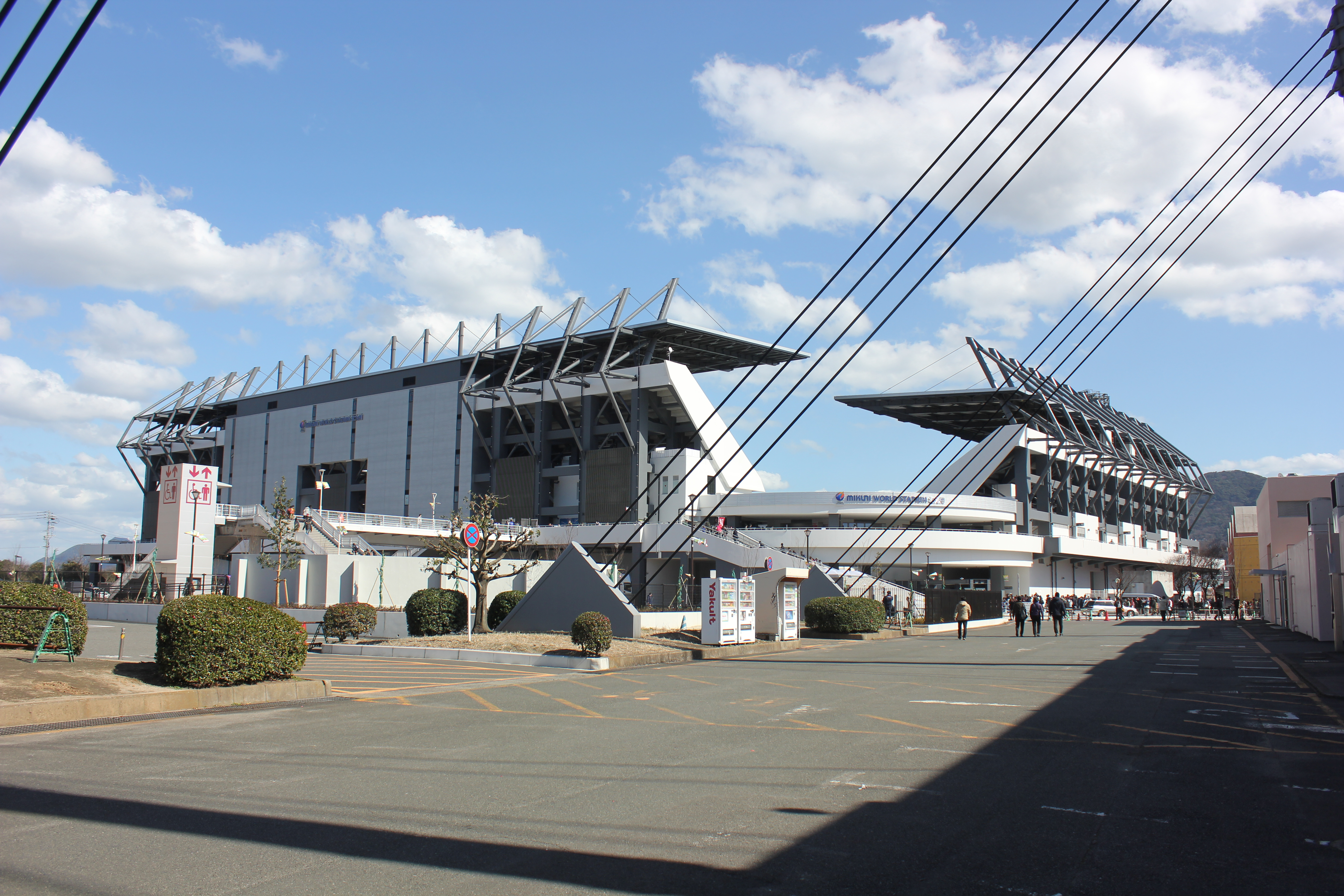
Exterior of stadium, 2017
