= Halatoa Vailea =

Japan international rugby union player

- Born: February 14, 1999 (age 27) Tonga
- Height: 1.87 m (6 ft 2 in)
- Weight: 105 kg (16 st 7 lb; 231 lb)
- School: Kashiwa High School
- University: Nippon Sport Science University

Rugby union career
- Position(s): Centre, Wing, Fullback, Fly-half, Flanker, Number 8
Senior career
Years	Team	Apps	(Points)
2022–present	Kubota Spears	68	(195)
- Correct as of 4 November 2025
International career
Years	Team	Apps	(Points)
2018	Japan U20	5	(20)
2025–	Japan XV	2	(0)
2025–	Japan	2	(5)
- Correct as of 4 November 2025

Halatoa Vailea (ハラトア・ヴァイレア); born February 14, 1999) is a Tongan Japanese-raised rugby union player who currently plays as a centre or wing for the Kubota Spears in Japan's League One.

== Early career ==
Vailea is from Tonga before moving to Japan for schooling, where he attended Kashiwa High School. After school, he moved to Japan to study at Nippon Sport Science University where he also played rugby between 2018 and 2022, playing originally as a loose forward. Having been schooled in Japan and being eligible on residency grounds, he represented Japan at U19 level, scoring a hat-trick against Ireland, In the same year he represented Japan U20.

== Professional career ==
Vailea signed for Kubota Spears in 2022. Having made 28 appearances in his first three seasons, he had a break out season in 2025, scoring eleven tries, the fifth most in the competition. His performances earned him selection for the Japan national side, making his debut against Wales scoring a try. In October of the same year, he represented Japan XV in their match against Australia A.
