= Liam Belcher =

Welsh rugby union player (born 1996)

- Born: Liam Belcher; 28 April 1996 (age 30) Church Village, Wales
- Height: 175 cm (5 ft 9 in)
- Weight: 106 kg (16 st 10 lb)
- School: Coleg Morgannwg; Coleg y Cymoedd

Rugby union career
- Position: Hooker
- Current team: Cardiff Rugby
Senior career
Years	Team	Apps	(Points)
2014–2017	Cardiff Rugby	5	(0)
2017–2018	Dragons	15	(25)
2018–	Cardiff Rugby	96	(45)
- Correct as of 18 November 2026
International career
Years	Team	Apps	(Points)
2015–2016	Wales U20	15	(10)
2025–	Wales	5	(0)
- Correct as of 18 November 2026

Liam Belcher (born 28 April 1996) is a Welsh rugby union player who plays at hooker for the Cardiff Rugby and the Wales national rugby team.

== Club career ==
=== Cardiff Blues ===
Having come through the Cardiff academy, Belcher made his senior professional debut for the Blue and Blacks in the Anglo-Welsh Cup during the 2014-15 season. He made a total of five appearances (all in the Anglo-Welsh cup) for Cardiff in his first stint, playing most of his rugby in this period for Merthyr RFC and Pontypridd RFC in the Welsh Premier Division.

=== Dragons ===
He was released at the end of the 2016-17 season and signed for rival region the Dragons, making a total of fifteen appearances across all competitions.

=== Cardiff Rugby ===
He was released however by the Dragons at the end of the 2017-18 season only to re-sign for Cardiff, establishing himself as a regular member of the senior squad. Belcher signed an extension in September 2020. Belcher considered walking away from the game in early 2023, but later signed a one-year extension with Cardiff. He was named as club captain for the 2024–25 United Rugby Championship, and signed a further extension in December 2024.

== International career ==
=== Wales grade age ===
In 2014, Belcher played for Wales under-18, having been selected in the squad for March friendlies, the European Championship in April, and a summer tour to South Africa.

From 2015–16, Belcher featured 15 times for Wales U20. He scored against England U20 in their victory during the 2015 Six Nations Under 20s Championship.

=== Wales ===
Belcher was selected to play in 2025 Wales rugby union tour of Japan. He earned his first cap for Wales as a substitute in the first test. He came off the bench in the second test in the second half.

He was selected for the 2025 end-of-year rugby union internationals. Belcher was named on the bench against Argentina and Japan, coming on in the second half in both matches.

Belcher was named in the squad for the 2026 Six Nations by Steve Tandy.
