= Garyn Phillips =

Welsh rugby union player

- Born: 14 May 2001 (age 25) Abercynon, Wales
- Height: 1.84 m (6 ft 1/2 in)
- Weight: 113 kg (17.8 st; 249 lb)
- School: Ysgol Gyfun Rhydywaun

Rugby union career
- Position: Prop
Senior career
Years	Team	Apps	(Points)
2021–	Ospreys	42	(0)
2021–2022	→ Cornish Pirates (loan)	4	(0)
International career
Years	Team	Apps	(Points)
2021	Wales U20	2	(0)
- Correct as of 25 October 2023

Garyn Phillips (born 14 May 2001) is a Welsh rugby union player who plays for the Ospreys as a prop.

== Club career ==
=== Early life and Cardiff Blues ===
Phillips played youth rugby for Abercynon RFC, and played for Coleg y Cymoedd, later joining the Cardiff Blues academy.

=== Ospreys ===
Phillips was named in the Ospreys academy for the 2020–21 season. He made his Ospreys debut in Round 12 of the 2020–21 Pro14 in the match against Zebre, coming on as a replacement. In 2021, Phillips joined Cornish Pirates on loan.

In May 2022, Phillips signed his first senior contract with the Ospreys, and signed an extension in February 2024.

== International career ==
=== Grade age ===
Phillips represented Wales at U16, U18, and U19 level. He represented Wales national under-20 rugby union team at the 2021 Six Nations Under 20s Championship.

=== Wales ===
Phillips was selected by Wales for the 2025 Wales rugby union tour of Japan. He was called up by Wales again for the final match of the 2025 end-of-year rugby union internationals.
