= Iestyn Hopkins =

Welsh rugby union player

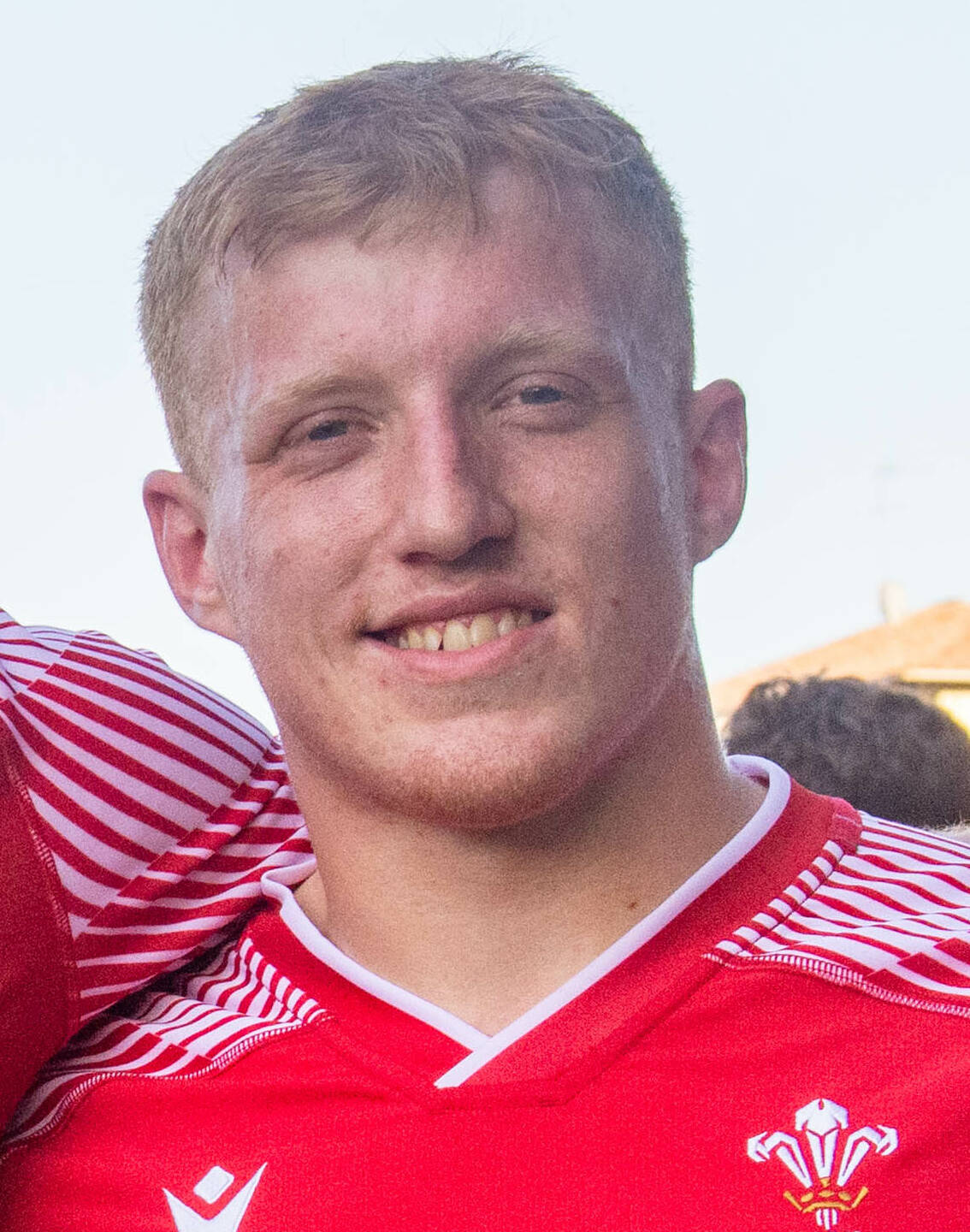
- Born: 4 April 2002 (age 24) Cwmllynfell, Wales
- Height: 173 cm (5 ft 8 in)
- Weight: 88 kg (13 st 12 lb)
- School: Ysgol Gymraeg Ystalyfera Bro Dur
- University: Swansea University

Rugby union career
- Position: Fullback
- Current team: Ospreys
Youth career
- Ystradgynlais RFC
Senior career
Years	Team	Apps	(Points)
2023–	Ospreys	22	(20)
International career
Years	Team	Apps	(Points)
2022	Wales U20	5	(0)

Iestyn Hopkins (born 4 April 2002) is a Welsh rugby union player, currently playing for United Rugby Championship side the Ospreys. His preferred position is fullback.

== Professional career ==
Hopkins is from Cwmllynfell, and began playing his junior rugby at Ystradgynlais RFC. He studied at Swansea University, and while there represented Swansea RFC. He broke through to the Ospreys squad in 2023, debuting against Zebre Parma in January. He scored his first try for the side against the Dragons in March.

Hopkins represented Wales U20 in 2022.
