= Keelan Giles =

Wales international rugby union player

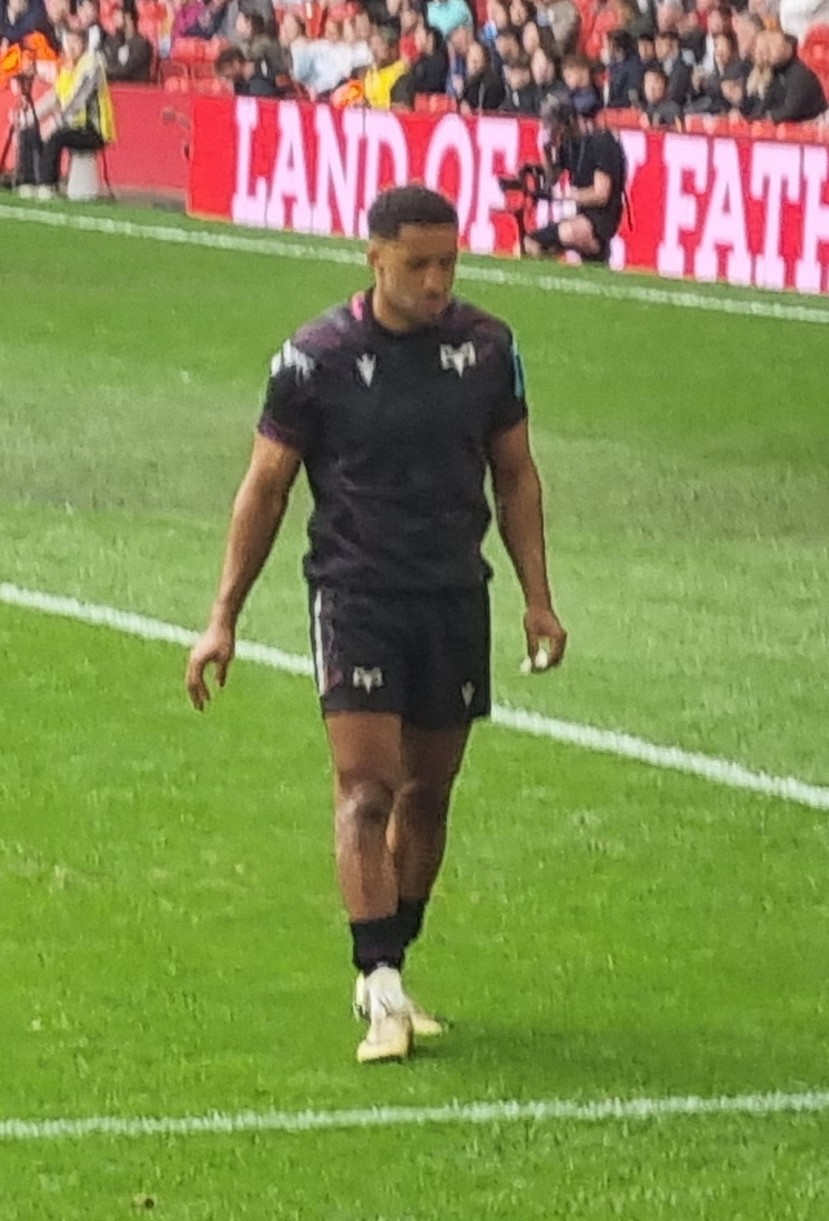
- Judgement Day 2025
- Born: Keelan Giles; 29 January 1998 (age 28) Swansea, Wales
- Height: 1.73 m (5 ft 8 in)
- Weight: 76 kg (12 st 0 lb; 168 lb)
- School: Gower College Swansea

Rugby union career
- Position: Wing
- Current team: Ospreys
Amateur team(s)
Years	Team	Apps	(Points)
- Gorseinon
–	Waunarlwydd		
Senior career
Years	Team	Apps	(Points)
2015–16	Swansea RFC	5	(30)
- Correct as of 1 October 2016
Provincial / State sides
Years	Team	Apps	(Points)
2016–	Ospreys	128	(250)
- Correct as of 13 August 2026
International career
Years	Team	Apps	(Points)
2016	Wales U20	6	(25)
2025-	Wales	2	(0)
- Correct as of 13 August 2026

Keelan Giles (born 29 January 1998) is a Welsh rugby union player, who plays for the Ospreys and Wales as a winger. He is a Wales under-20 international and received a call up to the Welsh senior team for their 2016 tour of New Zealand. He made the final three in BBC's Young Sports Personality of the Year 2016 along with Ellie Robinson and Amy Tinkler.

== Club career ==
Born in Swansea, he played his mini and junior rugby for Loughor RFC and then Waunarlwydd RFC, before he joined the Ospreys age-grade system, representing them at U16 and U18 level, as well as Swansea RFC. He undertook his education at Gower College Swansea.

== International career ==
A Wales under-20 international, Giles received a call up to the Welsh senior team for their 2016 tour of New Zealand. He was called in to the senior squad for Wales' 2016 Autumn International Series to cover injuries. Despite being named as a replacement for Wales' match against Japan, he stayed on the bench and was not called on to play. In May 2017 he was named in the Wales senior squad for the tests against Tonga and Samoa in June 2017.

Giles was called up again for the 2024 tour to Australia. Eventually, Giles made his debut for Wales' seniors in a 22-31 win vs Japan on the 2025 tour to Japan.
