= Javan Sebastian =

Scotland international rugby union player

- Born: 2 September 1994 (age 32) Bury St Edmunds, England
- Height: 1.77 m (5 ft 10 in)
- Weight: 118 kg (260 lb; 18 st 8 lb)
- School: Queen Elizabeth High School

Rugby union career
- Position: Prop
- Current team: Cardiff
Senior career
Years	Team	Apps	(Points)
2015–2023	Scarlets	68	(10)
2023–2025	Edinburgh Rugby	28	(10)
2025-	Cardiff Rugby		
- Correct as of 29 May 2024
International career
Years	Team	Apps	(Points)
2021–2024	Scotland	10	(0)
2022	Scotland 'A'	1	(0)
- Correct as of 28 July 2024

Javan Sebastian (born 2 September 1994) is a professional rugby union player who plays as a prop for United Rugby Championship club Cardiff Rugby.

== Club career ==
Sebastian has played for Carmarthen Athletic, Llanelli RFC and Carmarthen Quins.

Sebastian has represented Wales at under-16 and under-18 level. He was then signed as part of the Scarlets academy programme and made one competitive appearance for the Scarlets against Sale in the LV Cup.

Sebastian has signed a one-year partnership contract with the Glasgow Warriors which ran until May 2016. It was a full-time professional contract that allowed Sebastian to play for Ayr RFC when not on Warriors duty.

On 21 February 2023, it was announced that Sebastian would depart the Scarlets and join Edinburgh for the 2023–24 season.

== International career ==
Born in England, Sebastian is eligible to play for Wales, but also for Scotland through his father, who was born and raised in Edinburgh.

In June 2021, Sebastian was called up to the Scotland squad for the summer internationals against England A, Romania and Georgia. He was called up again for the Autumn internationals following the withdrawal of Rory Sutherland due to injury. He won his first cap by coming on as a second half substitute during the Autumn Internationals in a match against Japan on the 20th Nov 2021.

In 2023 Sebastian was selected in Scotland's 33 player squad for the 2023 Rugby World Cup in France.
