= Johnny Williams (rugby union, born 1996) =

Wales international rugby union player

- Born: John Bleddyn Rhys Williams; 18 October 1996 (age 30) Weston-super-Mare, England
- Height: 1.90 m (6 ft 3 in)
- Weight: 105 kg (16 st 7 lb)
- School: The Forest School, Winnersh, St Paul's College

Rugby union career
- Position: Centre
- Current team: Scarlets
Senior career
Years	Team	Apps	(Points)
2015–2018	London Irish	51	(60)
2018–2020	Newcastle Falcons	19	(25)
2020–	Scarlets	76	(60)
- Correct as of 13 August 2026
International career
Years	Team	Apps	(Points)
2016	England U20	5	(15)
2020–	Wales	10	(10)
- Correct as of 13 August 2026

Johnny Williams (born 18 October 1996) is a professional rugby union player who plays as a centre for the Scarlets in the United Rugby Championship and the Wales national team.

== Career ==
Williams made his debut for London Irish at the age of 18, and signed for Newcastle Falcons in May 2018 following Irish's relegation.

In 2019 Williams revealed he had been diagnosed with testicular cancer, and would take time away from the game to undergo treatment. He returned to professional rugby in January 2020.

On 14 July 2020, Williams signed for Pro14 side Scarlets ahead of the 2020–21 season.

== International ==
Williams played for England under 20s in the 2016 World Rugby Under 20 Championship, including starting the final where England beat Ireland.

In March 2019, Williams was named as a target of interest for incoming Wales coach Wayne Pivac, after it was confirmed that Williams is qualified to play internationally for the country through his father, who is from Rhyl. He also identifies as Welsh, like his father.

In June 2019 Williams played for England in a non capped international 51–43 win against the Barbarians, scoring a try.

On 6 October 2020 Williams was named in the senior Wales squad for the 2020 Autumn Nations Cup.

Williams made his debut for Wales on the 18 November 2020 in the starting line-up for the 18–0 win against Georgia. On 28 November 2020 in his second appearance for Wales he scored a try in the 24–13 defeat against England.

=== International tries ===
Try	Opponent	Location	Venue	Competition	Date	Result
1	England	Llanelli, Wales	Parc y Scarlets	Autumn Nations Cup	28 November 2020	Loss
2	New Zealand	Cardiff, Wales	Millennium Stadium	2021 Autumn internationals	30 October 2021	Loss
