= Steve Tandy =

Welsh rugby union footballer & coach

- Born: Steve Tandy; 16 January 1980 (age 46) Tonmawr, Neath Port Talbot, Wales
- Height: 184 cm (6 ft 0 in)
- Weight: 103 kg (16 st 3 lb; 227 lb)
- School: Neath Tertiary College

Rugby union career
- Position: Flanker
Amateur team(s)
Years	Team	Apps	(Points)
- Tonmawr RFC
Senior career
Years	Team	Apps	(Points)
1998–2003	Neath	74	(40)
2003–2010	Ospreys	102	(50)
Coaching career
- Years: Team
- 2010–2012: Bridgend
- 2012–2018: Ospreys
- 2018–2019: Waratahs (defence)
- 2019–2025: Scotland (defence)
- 2021: British & Irish Lions (defence)
- 2025–: Wales

Steve Tandy (born 16 January 1980) is a Welsh rugby union coach and former player. He is the current head coach of the Welsh national team, having previously coached the Ospreys and Scotland.

== Personal life ==
Tandy is married and has three daughters. Family considerations were a reason why he turned down a Wales tour coaching opportunity in 2017.

== Playing career ==
Hailing from Tonmawr RFC, Tandy played as an openside flanker for Neath RFC between 1994 and 2003. On joining Neath, he first played for their U21 side, before taking over the starting number 7 jersey from Brett Sinkinson. He went onto represent the club on 74 occasions, including an appearance as a replacement in the 2003 Celtic Cup final against Munster at the then Millennium Stadium, losing 37–17.

At the turn of Regional Rugby in Wales in 2003, Tandy joined Ospreys, where he earned only 102 appearances in his seven years, because of an injury impacted career. He never played for Wales despite impressing at regional level.

== Coaching career ==
While still a player, Tandy first started out coaching with his boyhood club Tonmawr RFC, leading their seconds (Tonmawr Dragons) to win the Percy Howell’s Districts Cup. He also coached within the Ospreys academy, leading the U16s to a WRU Age Grade Championship title in 2010.

During the 2010/11 season, he continued to combine his playing role with the Ospreys with the head coaching role at Bridgend Ravens, where he led the Ravens to the WRU Division 1 West title, with an incredible 96 points (just one defeat and one draw shy of an unbeaten season). He later guided them into the Principality Premiership with a victory over Glamorgan Wanderers (38–19) at the Cardiff Arms Park in the play-offs.

By the start of the 2011/12 season, he had played his last game for the Ospreys and had officially retired from professional rugby. With this, he continued to coach the Ravens, whilst also acting as a technical coach for the Ospreys and acting head coach for the Ospreys during their Anglo-Welsh Cup campaign.

However, in February 2012 he left the Ravens after he was installed as the Ospreys head coach role, where he replaced Sean Holley who immediately stood down as head coach of the region.

Despite the sudden change at the Ospreys, Tandy led the Welsh region to the 2011/12 Pro 12 title, defeating Leinster 31–30 in the final.

He remained at the Region until 2018, guiding them to two more domestic semi-finals; losing out to Munster in both 2015 and 2017, and a European Challenge Cup quarter-final against Stade Français in 2017.

During his near six-year stint at the Ospreys he was in charge of 192 matches in all tournaments, winning 102 for a 53% success rate.

In January 2018, Tandy and the Ospreys parted ways following a poor run of results during the 2017–18 Pro14 season.

In November 2018, Tandy was announced as the new defence coach for the New South Wales Waratahs ahead of the 2019 Super Rugby season. During his first season, he was integral in significantly improving the Waratahs defence, where his defensive systems led to the media calling the Waratahs' defence the ‘blue wall’.

His tenure with the Australian outfit lasted just one season, and by December 2019, Tandy left to join the Scottish Rugby Union as defence coach for the national mens side.

In his first Six Nations campaign in 2020, Scotland had the best defensive record in the championship, and they were joint top in 2021 and second best in 2024. Scotland's defence was integral in Scotland's significant victories over Australia and Argentina (twice), and wins over England, France and Wales. He was also involved with Scotland during the 2023 Rugby World Cup.

His efforts with Scotland's defence led to Warren Gatland selecting Tandy as defence coach for the British & Irish Lions during their 2021 tour to South Africa.

In July 2025, he was announced as the new Wales head coach, taking over on 1 September 2025. In doing so, he became the first Welsh-born head coach for the national team since Gareth Jenkins was sacked from the position in 2007. He replaced Matt Sherratt, who acted as interim head coach from February to July 2025. Sherratt later joined Tandy's backroom staff as attack coach. In March 2026, in the final round of the 2026 Six Nations, Wales beat Italy 31–17 to win their first Six Nations fixture since 2023. Despite this, they finished the tournament with their third consecutive wooden spoon.

In November 2026, as part of the inaugural Nations Championship series, Wales beat New Zealand for the first time since 1953.

== Coaching statistics ==
=== International statistics ===
As of 14th November 2026.

Record as coach of Wales, 2025–present
Opponent	P	W	D	L	W%	PF	PA
Argentina	2	0	0	2	0	49	87
England	1	0	0	1	0	7	48
Fiji	1	1	0	0	100	39	24
France	1	0	0	1	0	12	54
Ireland	1	0	0	1	0	17	27
Italy	1	1	0	0	100	31	17
Japan	2	2	0	0	100	52	44
New Zealand	2	1	0	1	50	61	80
Scotland	1	0	0	1	0	23	26
South Africa	2	0	0	2	0	0	116
Total	14	5	0	9	35	256	495

Preceded by Matt Sherratt (interim coach)	Wales national rugby union team coach 2025–Present	Succeeded by Incumbent
