= 2023–24 European Rugby Champions Cup pool stage =

European Rugby Champions Cup pool stage

The 2023–24 European Rugby Champions Cup pool stage was the first stage of the 29th season of pan-European professional club rugby union competition, and the tenth under the European Rugby Champions Cup format. Twenty-four clubs from three major domestic and regional leagues competed over four rounds of pool fixtures, with 16 teams progressing to the knockout stages.

== Structure ==
The pool stage draw took place on 21 June 2023. The complete fixture list was then announced on 13 July 2023. The fixtures were played out across four weekends between 8 December 2023 and 21 January 2024.

Teams play other teams in the same pool, except the other team from their own league, with two games at home and two away. The top four teams in each pool progress to the round of 16, whilst the teams ranked 5th progresses to the knockout stages of the 2023–24 EPCR Challenge Cup.

Teams are awarded points based on match performances; four points for a win, two points for a draw, one attacking bonus point for scoring four or more tries in a match and one defensive bonus point for losing a match by seven points or fewer.

If two or more clubs in the same pool are equal on match points, their ranking will be determined as follows:

1. the best aggregate points difference from the pool stage; or
2. if equal, the number of tries scored in the pool stage; or
3. if equal, the club with the fewest number of players suspended for disciplinary incidents in the pool stage; or
4. if still equal, by drawing lots.

== Pools ==
=== Pool A ===
2023–24 European Rugby Champions Cup Pool A
Team	P	W	D	L	PF	PA	Diff	TF	TA	TB	LB	Pts
(France) Bordeaux (4)	4	3	0	1	172	83	+89	26	11	4	1	17
(South Africa) Bulls (6)	4	3	0	1	132	102	+30	16	16	2	1	15
(France) Lyon (11)	4	2	0	2	121	123	–2	18	16	3	1	12
(England) Saracens (13)	4	2	0	2	125	142	–17	17	20	2	0	10
(Ireland) Connacht (11CC)	4	1	0	3	88	140	–52	13	19	2	0	6
(England) Bristol Bears	4	1	0	3	80	128	–48	11	19	1	0	5
Green background (rows 1 to 2) indicates qualification places for a home Champions Cup round of 16. Blue background (rows 3 to 4) indicates other teams qualified for the Champions Cup round of 16. Yellow background (row 5) indicates qualification place for the Challenge Cup round of 16. Plain background (row 6) indicates elimination from 2023–24 European competition. Starting table — source: European Professional Club Rugby

==== Round 1 ====
8 December 2023
20:00

Connacht (Ireland)	5–41	(France) Bordeaux (1 BP)
Try: Hurley-Langton 15' m	Report	Try: Buros (2) 8' c, 53' m Penaud 23' m Uberti (2) 42' c, 78' c Penalty try 67'; Con: Lucu (2/4) 9', 43'; Abadie (1/1) 79'; Pen: Lucu (1/1) 63'

Galway Sportsgrounds, Galway
Attendance: 6,024
Referee: Karl Dickson (England)

9 December 2023
19:30

Bulls (South Africa)	27–16	(England) Saracens
Try: Kriel 2' c Swanepoel 38' c Moodie 47' c Con: Goosen (3/3) 3', 39', 48'; Pen: Goosen (2/3) 10', 21'	Report	Try: Daly 61' m McFarland 71' m Pen: Farrell (2/2) 6', 23'

Loftus Versfeld Stadium, Pretoria
Attendance: 15,157
Referee: Andrea Piardi (Italy)

9 December 2023
20:00

(1 BP) Bristol Bears (England)	36–34	(France) Lyon (2 BP)
Try: Lane 4' c Luatua 22' c Thacker 29' c Randall 47' c Oghre 53' m Con: Sheedy (4/5) 5', 23', 30', 48'; Drop: Sheedy (1/1) 80+4'	Report	Try: Dumortier 7' m Okuya 9' m Abrahams (2) 57' m, 69' m Radradra 64' c Parisien 76' c Con: Page-Relo (1/4) 65'; Tchaptchet (1/2) 77'

Ashton Gate Stadium, Bristol
Attendance: 12,446
Referee: Craig Evans (Wales)

==== Round 2 ====
16 December 2023
13:00

(1 BP) Saracens (England)	55–36	(Ireland) Connacht (1 BP)
Try: González 7' m George (2) 32' m, 40' m Hartley (2) 42' c, 63' c Maitland 54' c Cinti 56' m Dan 70' m Con: Farrell (3/8) 43', 55', 64'; Pen: Farrell (3/3) 19', 38', 51'	Report	Try: Aki 12' c Blade 24' c Hanrahan 60' c Joyce 66' m Prendergast 80+1' c Con: Carty (2/2) 13', 25'; Hanrahan (2/3) 61', 80+2'; Pen: Carty (1/1) 28'

Barnet Copthall, London
Attendance: 9,029
Referee: Luc Ramos (France)

16 December 2023
16:15

(1 BP) Bordeaux (France)	36–17	(England) Bristol Bears
Try: Lucu 4' c Bielle-Biarrey 16' m Penaud 32' c Tapuai 55' c Nanette 66' c Con: Lucu (3/4) 5', 33', 56'; Jalibert (1/1) 67'; Pen: Lucu (1/1) 1'	Report	Try: Dun 62' c Lennon 73' c Con: Worsley (2/2) 63', 74'; Pen: Worsley (1/1) 15'

Stade Chaban-Delmas, Bordeaux
Attendance: 26,415
Referee: Frank Murphy (Ireland)

16 December 2023
18:30

(1 BP) Lyon (France)	29–28	(South Africa) Bulls (1 BP)
Try: Dumortier 22' c Pacheco 38' m Parisien 45' m Charcosset 61' c Regard 71' m Con: Page-Relo (1/3) 23'; Jackson (1/2) 62'	Report	Try: Burger 1' c Petersen 27' m Van Staden 67' c Con: C. Smith (2/3) 2', 68'; Pen: C. Smith (3/3) 11', 34', 42'

Stade de Gerland, Lyon
Attendance: 14,465
Referee: Mike Adamson (Scotland)

==== Round 3 ====
13 January 2024
14:00

(1 BP) Lyon (France)	34–20	(Ireland) Connacht
Try: Abrahams (2) 13' c, 74' c Tchaptchet 20' c Guillard 51' c Con: Jackson (4/4) 14', 21', 52', 74'; Pen: Jackson (2/2) 27', 35'	Report	Try: Jansen 7' m Prendergast 37' m McElroy 43' c Con: Hanrahan (1/3) 44'; Pen: Hanrahan (1/1) 67'

Stade de Gerland, Lyon
Attendance: 11,796
Referee: Craig Evans (Wales)

13 January 2024
15:15

Bristol Bears (England)	17–31	(South Africa) Bulls (1 BP)
Try: Marmion 19' c Ibitoye 74' m Bradbury 80' m Con: MacGinty (1/3) 20'	Report	Try: Petersen 14' c Mchunu 55' c E. Louw 63' c Wessels 66' c Con: Kriel (1/1) 16'; Goosen (3/3) 56', 64', 67'; Pen: Goosen (1/1) 6'

Ashton Gate Stadium, Bristol
Attendance: 19,040
Referee: Mathieu Raynal (France)

14 January 2024
18:30

(1 BP) Bordeaux (France)	55–15	(England) Saracens
Try: Bielle-Biarrey (2) 7' c, 80' m Buros 11' c Lamothe 20' m Penaud (2) 34' m, 56' c Depoortère 43' m Jalibert 51' c Uberti 77' c Con: Jalibert (3/6) 8', 12', 78'; Lucu (2/2) 52', 57'	Report	Try: Tompkins 61' c Dan 62' m Con: Farrell (1/2) 61'; Pen: Farrell (1/1) 3'

Stade Chaban-Delmas, Bordeaux
Attendance: 28,716
Referee: Chris Busby (Ireland)

==== Round 4 ====
19 January 2024
20:00

(1 BP) Connacht (Ireland)	27–10	(England) Bristol Bears
Try: Bolton 7' m Aungier 19' c Blade 32' m A. Smith 45' c Con: Hanrahan (1/2) 20'; Carty (1/2) 46'; Pen: Carty (1/1) 78'	Report	Try: Penalty try 80+1'; Pen: MacGinty (1/1) 31'

Galway Sportsgrounds, Galway
Attendance: 6,129
Referee: Pierre Brousset (France)

20 January 2024
15:00

Bulls (South Africa)	46–40	(France) Bordeaux (2 BP)
Try: Coetzee (2) 6' c, 26' c D. Williams 16' c Kriel 40' m Le Roux 42' c Papier 52' c Con: Goosen (5/6) 7', 17', 26', 43', 53'; Pen: Van der Walt (2/2) 64', 74'	Report	Try: Buros 13' c Coleman 33' c Tambwe 49' c Tatafu (2) 54' c, 66' m Abadie 59' c Con: Holmes (4/4) 14', 34', 50', 55'; Garcia (1/2) 60'

Loftus Versfeld Stadium, Pretoria
Attendance: 10,516
Referee: Karl Dickson (England)

20 January 2024
20:00

(1 BP) Saracens (England)	39–24	(France) Lyon
Try: Van Zyl 3' m Itoje (2) 43' c, 55' c González 68' c Cinti 75' c Con: Farrell (4/5) 44', 56', 68', 76'; Pen: Farrell (2/2) 48', 64'	Report	Try: Niniashvili 14' c Maraku (2) 39' c, 45' c Con: Berdeu (3/3) 15', 40', 46'; Pen: Berdeu (1/1) 25'

Barnet Copthall, London
Attendance: 8,837
Referee: Sam Grove-White (Scotland)

=== Pool B ===
2023–24 European Rugby Champions Cup Pool B
Team	P	W	D	L	PF	PA	Diff	TF	TA	TB	LB	Pts
(France) Toulouse (1)	4	4	0	0	178	69	+109	26	10	4	0	20
(England) Harlequins (5)	4	3	0	1	151	109	+42	22	16	3	0	15
(England) Bath (9)	4	3	0	1	124	102	+22	18	14	3	0	15
(France) Racing 92 (16)	4	1	0	3	116	117	–1	17	16	2	2	8
(Ireland) Ulster (12CC)	4	1	0	3	88	147	–59	12	22	1	0	5
(Wales) Cardiff	4	0	0	4	80	193	–113	11	28	2	1	3
Green background (rows 1 to 2) indicates qualification places for a home Champions Cup round of 16. Blue background (rows 3 to 4) indicates other teams qualified for the Champions Cup round of 16. Yellow background (row 5) indicates qualification place for the Challenge Cup round of 16. Plain background (row 6) indicates elimination from 2023–24 European competition. Starting table — source: European Professional Club Rugby

==== Round 1 ====
9 December 2023
15:15

(1 BP) Bath (England)	37–14	(Ireland) Ulster
Try: Cokanasiga (2) 27' m, 71' m Dunn 45' c Du Toit 69' c Gallagher 78' c Con: Spencer (2/4) 46', 70'; Bailey (1/1) 80'; Pen: Spencer (2/2) 32', 58'	Report	Try: Burns 33' c N. Doak 37' c Con: N. Doak (2/2) 34' 37'

Recreation Ground, Bath
Attendance: 13,918
Referee: Pierre Brousset (France)

9 December 2023
16:15

(1 BP) Toulouse (France)	52–7	(Wales) Cardiff
Try: Lebel 4' c Arnold 9' c Kinghorn (2) 25' c, 80' c Jelonch 38' c Retière 45' c Placines 69' c Con: Ramos (5/5) 6', 10', 26', 36', 46'; Germain (2/2) 70', 80+2'; Pen: Ramos (1/1) 28'	Report	Try: Martin 23' c Con: De Beer (1/1) 24'

Stade Ernest-Wallon, Toulouse
Attendance: 18,750
Referee: Anthony Woodthorpe (England)

10 December 2023
18:30

(2 BP) Racing 92 (France)	28–31	(England) Harlequins (1 BP)
Try: Le Garrec (2) 14' c, 41' c Gibert 39' c Diallo 57' c Con: Le Garrec (4/4) 15', 40', 42', 58'	Report	Try: M. Smith 21' c Esterhuizen 24' c Dombrandt 60' c Walker 64' c Con: M. Smith (4/4) 22', 25', 61', 66'; Drop: M. Smith (1/1) 37'

Paris La Défense Arena, Paris
Attendance: 9,385
Referee: Frank Murphy (Ireland)

==== Round 2 ====
16 December 2023
20:00

(2 BP) Cardiff (Wales)	32–39	(England) Bath (1 BP)
Try: Adams (2) 4' c, 19' c Hamer-Webb 37' m Thomas 43' c Con: De Beer (3/4) 5', 20', 44'; Pen: De Beer (2/2) 18', 26'	Report	Try: Cokanasiga 7' m Lawrence 14' m Barbeary 22' c Dunn 29' c Coetzee (2) 65' m, 70' c Con: Russell (3/6) 24', 30', 71'; Pen: Russell (1/1) 53'

Cardiff Arms Park, Cardiff
Attendance: 10,158
Referee: Sam Grove-White (Scotland)

16 December 2023
20:00

(1 BP) Ulster (Ireland)	31–15	(France) Racing 92
Try: Timoney (2) 3' c, 46' c McCloskey 22' c Mat. Rea 36' c Con: Cooney (4/4) 4', 23', 38', 48'; Pen: Cooney (1/1) 69'	Report	Try: Le Garrec 29' m Tarrit (2) 55' m, 65' m

Ravenhill Stadium, Belfast
Attendance: 12,282
Referee: Luke Pearce (England)

17 December 2023
15:15

Harlequins (England)	19–47	(France) Toulouse (1 BP)
Try: Esterhuizen 9' c Herbst (2) 39' m, 46' c Con: M. Smith (2/3) 10', 48'	Report	Try: Barassi (2) 6' c, 50' c Delibes 11' c Mauvaka 35' c Lebel 42' c Neti 73' c Ramos 76' m Con: Ramos (6/7) 8', 13', 36', 43', 52', 75'

Twickenham Stoop, London
Attendance: 12,582
Referee: Chris Busby (Ireland)

==== Round 3 ====
13 January 2024
20:00

Cardiff (Wales)	15–54	(England) Harlequins (1 BP)
Try: Young (2) 6' m, 22' c Con: De Beer (1/2) 23'; Pen: De Beer (1/1) 4'	Report	Try: Walker 9' c Esterhuizen 26' c W. Evans 34' c Beard 37' c M. Smith 44' m Lewis 68' c Baxter 75' c T. Green 79' c Con: M. Smith (7/8) 10', 27', 35', 39', 69', 76', 80'

Cardiff Arms Park, Cardiff
Attendance: 12,000
Referee: Frank Murphy (Ireland)

13 January 2024
20:00

Ulster (Ireland)	24–48	(France) Toulouse (1 BP)
Try: Stewart 41' c Addison 61' c Timoney 68' c Con: Cooney (1/1) 41'; N. Doak (2/2) 62', 68'; Pen: Cooney (1/1) 12'	Report	Try: Lebel 9' c Mauvaka (2) 30' m, 52' m Dupont (2) 34' c, 46' c Roumat 56' c Meafou 80' c Con: Ramos (4/6) 10', 36', 48', 57'; Kinghorn (1/1) 80'; Pen: Ramos (1/1) 18'

Ravenhill Stadium, Belfast
Attendance: 16,592
Referee: Matthew Carley (England)

14 January 2024
15:15

(1 BP) Bath (England)	29–25	(France) Racing 92 (1 BP)
Try: Du Toit 34' m Barbeary 59' c Cokanasiga 62' c Muir 71' c Con: Spencer (3/4) 60', 63', 72'; Pen: Spencer (1/2) 12'	Report	Try: Le Garrec 17' c Kamikamica 42' c Arundell 57' m Con: Le Garrec (2/3) 18', 43'; Pen: Le Garrec (2/2) 7', 67'

Recreation Ground, Bath
Attendance: 14,188
Referee: Andrea Piardi (Italy)

==== Round 4 ====
20 January 2024
13:00

Harlequins (England)	47–19	(Ireland) Ulster
Try: David (2) 4' c, 64' c Lynagh (2) 24' c, 32' c Care 47' c Esterhuizen 58' m W. Evans 72' c Con: M. Smith (6/7) 5', 26', 34', 48', 66', 73'	Report	Try: McCann 14' c McCloskey 70' c Stockdale 78' m Con: Cooney (1/1) 15'; N. Doak (1/2) 70'

Twickenham Stoop, London
Attendance: 12,579
Referee: Mathieu Raynal (France)

20 January 2024
16:15

(1 BP) Racing 92 (France)	48–26	(Wales) Cardiff (1 BP)
Try: Kamikamica 17' c Kolisi 24' m Tabuavou 31' m Tedder 42' c Wade 46' m Baudonne 49' c Tarrit 74' c Con: Tedder (5/7) 18', 44', 47', 50', 76'; Pen: Le Garrec (1/1) 4'	Report	Try: Carré 7' c To. Williams (2) 37' m, 63' c De Beer 71' c Con: De Beer (3/4) 8', 64', 72'

Paris La Défense Arena, Paris
Attendance: 11,671
Referee: Christophe Ridley (England)

21 January 2024
16:15

(1 BP) Toulouse (France)	31–19	(England) Bath
Try: Meafou 5' m Ramos (2) 8' c, 76' c Penalty try 27'; Mallía 67' m Con: Ramos (2/4) 10', 77'	Report	Try: Obano 13' c Du Toit 22' m Lawrence 38' c Con: Spencer (2/3) 14', 40'

Stade Ernest-Wallon, Toulouse
Attendance: 18,754
Referee: Andrew Brace (Ireland)

=== Pool C ===
2023–24 European Rugby Champions Cup Pool C
Team	P	W	D	L	PF	PA	Diff	TF	TA	TB	LB	Pts
(England) Northampton Saints (3)	4	4	0	0	137	75	+62	18	10	2	0	18
(England) Exeter Chiefs (8)	4	3	0	1	87	99	–12	13	14	1	0	13
(Scotland) Glasgow Warriors (12)	4	2	0	2	77	63	+14	12	8	1	1	10
(Ireland) Munster (14)	4	1	1	2	93	93	0	13	10	2	1	9
(France) Bayonne (9CC)	4	1	1	2	82	107	–25	11	16	1	1	8
(France) Toulon	4	0	0	4	60	99	–39	7	16	0	2	2
Green background (rows 1 to 2) indicates qualification places for a home Champions Cup round of 16. Blue background (rows 3 to 4) indicates other teams qualified for the Champions Cup round of 16. Yellow background (row 5) indicates qualification place for the Challenge Cup round of 16. Plain background (row 6) indicates elimination from 2023–24 European competition. Starting table — source: European Professional Club Rugby

==== Round 1 ====
8 December 2023
20:00

Glasgow Warriors (Scotland)	19–28	(England) Northampton Saints
Try: Cancelliere 3' m O. Smith 67' c Penalty try 78'; Con: Thompson (1/1) 69'	Report	Try: Lawes 12' c Freeman (2) 19' m, 29' c Con: F. Smith (2/3) 13', 30'; Pen: F. Smith (3/3) 15', 46', 57'

Scotstoun Stadium, Glasgow
Attendance: 6,579
Referee: Luc Ramos (France)

9 December 2023
14:00

(1 BP) Toulon (France)	18–19	(England) Exeter Chiefs
Try: Gigashvili 19' c White 23' m Con: Hervé (1/2) 20'; Pen: Hervé (2/2) 34', 37'	Report	Try: Skinner 15' m Norey 59' c Vermeulen 78' c Con: Slade (2/3) 61', 80'

Stade Mayol, Toulon
Attendance: 13,033
Referee: Chris Busby (Ireland)

9 December 2023
17:30

Munster (Ireland)	17–17	(France) Bayonne
Try: S. McCarthy 9' c G. Coombes 20' c Con: Crowley (2/2) 10', 20'; Pen: Crowley (1/1) 54'	Report	Try: Tagi 46' c Baget 75' c Con: Machenaud (1/1) 47'; Dolhagaray (1/1) 76'; Pen: Machenaud (1/1) 4'

Thomond Park, Limerick
Attendance: 18,908
Referee: Luke Pearce (England)

==== Round 2 ====
15 December 2023
20:00

(1 BP) Northampton Saints (England)	22–19	(France) Toulon (1 BP)
Try: Seabrook 6' m Furbank (2) 28' m, 57' m Lockett 77' c Con: F. Smith (1/4) 78'	Report	Try: Jaminet 54' m Ribbans 65' m Pen: Herve (2/2) 5', 62'; Drop: Jaminet (1/1) 69'

Franklin's Gardens, Northampton
Attendance: 13,265
Referee: Craig Evans (Wales)

15 December 2023
21:00

(1 BP) Bayonne (France)	11–12	(Scotland) Glasgow Warriors
Try: Bosch 33' m Pen: Lopez (2/2) 28', 49'	Report	Try: Miller 37' c McKay 56' m Con: Thompson (1/2) 38'

Stade Jean-Dauger, Bayonne
Attendance: 13,507
Referee: Adam Leal (England)

17 December 2023
13:00

(1 BP) Exeter Chiefs (England)	32–24	(Ireland) Munster (1 BP)
Try: Frost 15' c Vintcent 62' c Dunne 64' c Slade 78' m Con: Slade (3/4) 16', 63', 66'; Pen: Slade (2/2) 26', 45'	Report	Try: Nash 6' c Ahern 22' m Frisch 36' c S. Daly 49' c Con: Crowley (2/4) 7', 37'

Sandy Park, Exeter
Attendance: 13,634
Referee: Mathieu Raynal (France)

==== Round 3 ====
12 January 2024
20:00

(1 BP) Northampton Saints (England)	61–14	(France) Bayonne
Try: Freeman 1' c Pearson (3) 13' c, 20' c, 44' m Lawes 26' c Langdon 31' c A. Waller (2) 38' c, 48' c James 70' c Con: F. Smith (8/9) 2', 13', 20', 28', 33', 40', 49', 71'	Report	Try: Spring 64' c Callandret 76' c Con: Dolhagaray (2/2) 65', 77'

Franklin's Gardens, Northampton
Attendance: 13,248
Referee: Mike Adamson (Scotland)

13 January 2024
13:00

Exeter Chiefs (England)	19–17	(Scotland) Glasgow Warriors (1 BP)
Try: Vermeulen 41' c Frost 62' m Wimbush 76' c Con: Slade (2/3) 43', 77'	Report	Try: Rowe 27' c Tuipulotu 54' c Con: Weir (2/2) 28', 56'; Pen: Horne (1/1) 10'

Sandy Park, Exeter
Attendance: 12,155
Referee: Pierre Brousset (France)

13 January 2024
16:15

Toulon (France)	18–29	(Ireland) Munster (1 BP)
Try: Paia'aua 22' c C. du Preez 53' m Con: Jaminet (1/2) 23'; Pen: Jaminet (2/2) 15', 34'	Report	Try: Nankivell 30' c Zebo 36' c Ahern 46' m Nash 58' c Con: Crowley (3/4) 31', 37', 60'; Pen: Crowley (1/1) 26'

Stade Mayol, Toulon
Attendance: 15,248
Referee: Nika Amashukeli (Georgia)

==== Round 4 ====
19 January 2024
20:00

(1 BP) Glasgow Warriors (Scotland)	29–5	(France) Toulon
Try: Rowe (2) 21' m, 80+2' m Jones (2) 30' c, 63' m McKay 59' c Con: Horne (2/4) 31', 61'	Report	Try: Dréan 47' m

Scotstoun Stadium, Glasgow
Attendance: 7,216
Referee: Matthew Carley (England)

20 January 2024
17:30

(1 BP) Munster (Ireland)	23–26	(England) Northampton Saints
Try: Frisch 37' c O'Mahony 40+1' m G. Coombes 48' m Con: Crowley (1/3) 38'; Pen: Crowley (2/3) 31', 63'	Report	Try: Mitchell 18' c Graham 70' c Con: F. Smith (2/2) 18', 71'; Pen: F. Smith (3/4) 42', 55', 66'; Drop: F. Smith (1/1) 59'

Thomond Park, Limerick
Attendance: 24,620
Referee: Tual Trainini (France)

21 January 2024
18:30

(1 BP) Bayonne (France)	40–17	(England) Exeter Chiefs
Try: Spring 1' c Mikautadze 18' m Callandret 31' c Hannoun 33' c Mori (2) 64' c, 68' c Con: Dolhagaray (5/6) 2', 32', 34', 65', 70'	Report	Try: Frost 12' c Jenkins 40' m Tuima 43' m Con: Slade (1/3) 14'

Stade Jean-Dauger, Bayonne
Attendance: 12,625
Referee: Nika Amashukeli (Georgia)

=== Pool D ===
2023–24 European Rugby Champions Cup Pool D
Team	P	W	D	L	PF	PA	Diff	TF	TA	TB	LB	Pts
(Ireland) Leinster (2)	4	4	0	0	123	53	+70	17	5	3	0	19
(South Africa) Stormers (7)	4	3	0	1	102	99	+3	12	12	2	0	14
(France) La Rochelle (10)	4	2	0	2	111	73	+38	13	9	2	2	12
(England) Leicester Tigers (15)	4	2	0	2	84	122	–38	10	16	1	0	9
(England) Sale Sharks (10CC)	4	1	0	3	103	110	–7	13	14	1	1	6
(France) Stade Français	4	0	0	4	56	122	–66	8	17	0	2	2
Green background (rows 1 to 2) indicates qualification places for a home Champions Cup round of 16. Blue background (rows 3 to 4) indicates other teams qualified for the Champions Cup round of 16. Yellow background (row 5) indicates qualification place for the Challenge Cup round of 16. Plain background (row 6) indicates elimination from 2023–24 European competition. Starting table — source: European Professional Club Rugby

==== Round 1 ====
10 December 2023
13:00

Sale Sharks (England)	28–5	(France) Stade Français
Try: O'Flaherty 52' m Hill 62' c Dugdale 73' c Con: Curtis (2/2) 64', 74'; Pen: Ford (3/3) 13', 39', 49'	Report	Try: Ward 25' m

AJ Bell Stadium, Salford
Attendance: 6,432
Referee: Mike Adamson (Scotland)

10 December 2023
15:15

(1 BP) La Rochelle (France)	9–16	(Ireland) Leinster
Pen: Hastoy (3/4) 1', 36', 51'	Report	Try: Larmour 11' c Con: H. Byrne (1/1) 12'; Pen: Frawley (3/3) 40', 59', 80'

Stade Marcel-Deflandre, La Rochelle
Attendance: 16,700
Referee: Matthew Carley (England)

10 December 2023
16:15

(1 BP) Leicester Tigers (England)	35–26	(South Africa) Stormers
Try: Kata (2) 13' c, 46' c Pollard 64' c Bassett 80+1' m Con: Pollard (3/4) 14', 48', 65'; Pen: Pollard (3/3) 5', 41', 57'	Report	Try: Morabe 28' c Skosan 39' c Con: Matthee (2/2) 29', 40+1'; Pen: Matthee (3/3) 11', 61', 68'; Drop: Matthee (1/1) 51'

Welford Road Stadium, Leicester
Attendance: 19,439
Referee: Tual Trainini (France)

==== Round 2 ====
16 December 2023
15:00

Stormers (South Africa)	21–20	(France) La Rochelle (1 BP)
Try: Loader 51' m Venter 78' c Con: Libbok (1/2) 80'; Pen: Libbok (3/3) 35', 40', 43'	Report	Try: Kerr-Barlow 6' c Tanga 45' c Con: Hastoy (1/1) 7', 46'; Pen: Hastoy (2/3) 2', 37'

Cape Town Stadium, Cape Town
Attendance: 11,552
Referee: Christophe Ridley (England)

16 December 2023
17:30

(1 BP) Leinster (Ireland)	37–27	(England) Sale Sharks
Try: Van der Flier 39' m Gibson-Park 42' m Henshaw 56' c Baird 61' c Healy 69' c Con: Frawley (2/4) 57', 62'; Prendergast (1/1) 70'; Pen: Frawley (2/2) 14', 30'	Report	Try: Doherty 24' c Taylor 78' c Curtis 80' c Con: R. du Preez (3/3) 26', 79', 80+1'; Pen: R. du Preez (2/2) 3', 17'

RDS Arena, Dublin
Attendance: 18,600
Referee: Pierre Brousset (France)

17 December 2023
18:30

(1 BP) Stade Français (France)	24–27	(England) Leicester Tigers
Try: Hirigoyen 15' c Laloi 40' c Barré 61' c Con: Segonds (3/3) 16', 42', 62'; Pen: Segonds (1/1) 38'	Report	Try: Vanes (3) 7' c, 45' c, 53' c Con: Shillcock (3/3) 8', 46', 54'; Pen: Shillcock (2/2) 57', 66'

Stade Jean-Bouin, Paris
Attendance: 10,478
Referee: Nika Amashukeli (Georgia)

==== Round 3 ====
13 January 2024
17:30

(1 BP) Leinster (Ireland)	43–7	(France) Stade Français
Try: Lowe 17' c Van der Flier 30' m Sheehan 40' m Larmour (2) 44' m, 67' c Doris (2) 46' c, 60' c Con: Frawley (1/3) 18'; Prendergast (3/4) 47', 61', 67'	Report	Try: Segonds 80+1' c Con: Henry (1/1) 80+2'

Aviva Stadium, Dublin
Attendance: 42,003
Referee: Christophe Ridley (England)

13 January 2024
19:30

(1 BP) Stormers (South Africa)	31–24	(England) Sale Sharks (1 BP)
Try: Dayimani 7' c Hartzenberg 22' c Zas (2) 32' c, 51' c Con: Libbok (4/4) 8', 23', 34', 52'; Pen: Libbok (1/3) 60'	Report	Try: Hill 26' c Creevy 39' c Bedlow 70' c Con: R. du Preez (3/3) 27', 40', 72'; Pen: R. du Preez (1/1) 47'

Cape Town Stadium, Cape Town
Attendance: 25,963
Referee: Luc Ramos (France)

14 January 2024
16:15

(1 BP) La Rochelle (France)	45–12	(England) Leicester Tigers
Try: Bourgarit 5' c Skelton 31' c Seuteni (2) 42' c, 73' m Thomas (2) 44' c, 67' m Sclavi 58' c Con: Hastoy (5/7) 6', 32', 43', 46', 60'	Report	Try: Martin 37' c Kelly 79' m Con: Shillcock (1/1) 38'

Stade Marcel-Deflandre, La Rochelle
Attendance: 16,700
Referee: Andrew Brace (Ireland)

==== Round 4 ====
20 January 2024
15:15

Leicester Tigers (England)	10–27	(Ireland) Leinster (1 BP)
Try: Liebenberg 9' c Con: Pollard (1/1) 10'; Pen: Pollard (1/1) 20'	Report	Try: J. McCarthy 28' c Larmour 33' m Sheehan 43' c Doris 80+4' m Con: H. Byrne (2/3) 29', 44'; Pen: H. Byrne (1/1) 22'

Welford Road Stadium, Leicester
Attendance: 24,849
Referee: Andrea Piardi (Italy)

20 January 2024
18:30

(1 BP) Stade Français (France)	20–24	(South Africa) Stormers (1 BP)
Try: Timo 1' m Ètien 26' c Hirigoyen 45' m Con: Segonds (1/3) 27'; Pen: Segonds (1/1) 12'	Report	Try: Jantjies 9' m Van Heerden 15' m Stassen 57' c Libbok 71' c Con: Libbok (2/4) 58', 72'

Stade Jean-Bouin, Paris
Attendance: 10,552
Referee: Luke Pearce (England)

21 January 2024
13:00

(1 BP) Sale Sharks (England)	24–37	(France) La Rochelle (1 BP)
Try: Roebuck 58' m Creevy 66' c Dugdale 76' c Veainu 80+1' m Con: Ford (1/2) 67'; Bedlow (1/2) 78'	Report	Try: Leyds 8' c Hastoy 42' c Kerr-Barlow 46' c Seuteni 71' c Con: Hastoy (3/3) 9', 44', 47'; Reus (1/1) 73'; Pen: Hastoy (3/3) 13', 37', 41'

AJ Bell Stadium, Salford
Attendance: 10,012
Referee: Chris Busby (Ireland)
