= 2025 Ireland rugby union tour of Georgia and Portugal =

- Coach: Paul O'Connell
- Tour captain: Craig Casey
- Top test point scorer: Jack Crowley (24)
- Top test try scorer: Tommy O'Brien (4)
Summary
P	W	D	L
Total
2	2	0	0
Test match
2	2	0	0
Opponent
P	W	D	L
Georgia
1	1	0	0
Portugal
1	1	0	0

Tour chronology
- ← South Africa 2024

As part of the 2025 July internationals, Ireland rugby union team toured Georgia and Portugal. This was the first time Georgia hosted Ireland in a Test match, and the first time Ireland and Portugal had met.

This was Ireland's first tour to a "Tier 2" nation since their 2017 tour of Japan, and their first in Europe since 1988. The tour coincided with the 2025 British & Irish Lions' tour of Australia, leaving Ireland without 15 senior internationals who had been selected for the Lions, as well as the services of head coach Andy Farrell and assistant coaches Simon Easterby, John Fogarty and Andrew Goodman, all of whom were part of the Lions' coaching staff.

Ireland won both Test matches, securing the series with a record defeat of the hosts in the second Test.

== Schedule ==
Date and time	Venue	Home	Score	Away
5 July 2025; 21:00 GET (UTC+04)	Mikheil Meskhi Stadium, Tbilisi	Georgia	5–34	Ireland
12 July 2025; 19:00 WEST (UTC+01)	Estádio Nacional, Lisbon	Portugal	7–106	Ireland

== Venues ==
Tbilisi	2025 Ireland rugby union tour of Georgia and Portugal is located in Europe
Mikheil Meskhi Stadium	2025 Ireland rugby union tour of Georgia and Portugal is located in Europe
Capacity: 27,223	2025 Ireland rugby union tour of Georgia and Portugal is located in Europe
Lisbon	2025 Ireland rugby union tour of Georgia and Portugal is located in Europe
Estádio Nacional	2025 Ireland rugby union tour of Georgia and Portugal is located in Europe
Capacity: 37,593	2025 Ireland rugby union tour of Georgia and Portugal is located in Europe

== Squad ==
On 4 June, Ireland named 32-man squad for their July internationals against Georgia and Portugal. On 1 July, prop Scott Wilson joined the squad.

- Head Coach: Paul O'Connell
- Assistant Coach: Denis Leamy
- Assistant Coach: Mike Prendergast
- Assistant Coach: Colm Tucker

Player	Position	Date of birth (age)	Caps	Club/province
Gus McCarthy	Hooker	23 July 2003 (aged 21)	4	(Ireland) Leinster
Stephen Smyth	Hooker	1 August 2004 (aged 20)	0	(Ireland) Leinster
Tom Stewart	Hooker	11 January 2001 (aged 24)	2	(Ireland) Ulster
Jack Aungier	Prop	20 November 1998 (aged 26)	0	(Ireland) Connacht
Jack Boyle	Prop	10 March 2002 (aged 23)	2	(Ireland) Leinster
Tom Clarkson	Prop	22 February 2000 (aged 25)	6	(Ireland) Leinster
Paddy McCarthy	Prop	28 May 2003 (aged 22)	0	(Ireland) Leinster
Michael Milne	Prop	5 February 1999 (aged 26)	0	(Ireland) Munster
Tom O'Toole	Prop	23 September 1998 (aged 26)	16	(Ireland) Ulster
Scott Wilson	Prop	6 August 2002 (aged 22)	0	(Ireland) Ulster
Thomas Ahern	Lock	22 February 2000 (aged 25)	0	(Ireland) Munster
Ryan Baird	Lock	26 July 1999 (aged 25)	27	(Ireland) Leinster
Cormac Izuchukwu	Lock	28 January 2000 (aged 25)	1	(Ireland) Ulster
Darragh Murray	Lock	4 July 2001 (aged 24)	0	(Ireland) Connacht
Gavin Coombes	Back row	11 December 1997 (aged 27)	2	(Ireland) Munster
Max Deegan	Back row	1 October 1996 (aged 28)	2	(Ireland) Leinster
Alex Kendellen	Back row	3 March 2001 (aged 24)	0	(Ireland) Munster
Cian Prendergast	Back row	23 February 2000 (aged 25)	4	(Ireland) Connacht
Nick Timoney	Back row	1 August 1995 (aged 29)	3	(Ireland) Ulster
Craig Casey (c)	Scrum-half	19 April 1999 (aged 26)	18	(Ireland) Munster
Nathan Doak	Scrum-half	17 December 2001 (aged 23)	0	(Ireland) Ulster
Ben Murphy	Scrum-half	23 April 2001 (aged 24)	0	(Ireland) Connacht
Jack Crowley	Fly-half	13 January 2000 (aged 25)	24	(Ireland) Munster
Ciarán Frawley	Fly-half	4 December 1997 (aged 27)	8	(Ireland) Leinster
Sam Prendergast	Fly-half	12 February 2003 (aged 22)	8	(Ireland) Leinster
Hugh Gavin	Centre	10 January 2004 (aged 21)	0	(Ireland) Connacht
Stuart McCloskey	Centre	6 August 1992 (aged 32)	19	(Ireland) Ulster
Tommy O'Brien	Centre	28 May 1998 (aged 27)	0	(Ireland) Leinster
Jamie Osborne	Centre	16 November 2001 (aged 23)	7	(Ireland) Leinster
Shayne Bolton	Wing	29 June 2000 (aged 25)	0	(Ireland) Connacht
Calvin Nash	Wing	8 August 1997 (aged 27)	10	(Ireland) Munster
Jacob Stockdale	Wing	3 April 1996 (aged 29)	38	(Ireland) Ulster
Jimmy O'Brien	Fullback	27 November 1996 (aged 28)	8	(Ireland) Leinster

== Matches ==
=== First Test ===
5 July 2025
21:00 GET (UTC+4)

Georgia	5–34	Ireland
Try: Jalaghonia 40+5' m	Report	Try: T. O'Brien (2) 2' c, 8' c Casey 41' c Timoney 70' c Con: Prendergast (4/4) 3', 9', 42', 71'; Pen: Prendergast (2/2) 45', 62'

Mikheil Meskhi Stadium, Tbilisi
Attendance: 25,000
Referee: Andrea Piardi (Italy)

FB	15	Davit Niniashvili
RW	14	Aka Tabutsadze
OC	13	Demur Tapladze	(substituted off) 61'
IC	12	Giorgi Kveseladze
LW	11	Alexander Todua
FH	10	Luka Matkava
SH	9	Vasil Lobzhanidze
N8	8	Tornike Jalaghonia	(substituted off) 55'
OF	7	Beka Saghinadze (c)
BF	6	Luka Ivanishvili	(substituted off) 78'
RL	5	Lado Chachanidze
LL	4	Mikheil Babunashvili
TP	3	Irakli Aptsiauri	(substituted off) 55'
HK	2	Vano Karkadze	(substituted off) 55'
LP	1	Giorgi Akhaladze	(substituted off) 55'
Substitutions:
HK	16	Irakli Kvatadze	(substituted on) 55'
PR	17	Giorgi Tetrashvili	(substituted on) 55'
PR	18	Beka Gigashvili	(substituted on) 55'
LK	19	Giorgi Javakhia	(substituted on) 78'
FL	20	Ilia Spanderashvili	(substituted on) 55'
SH	21	Mikheil Alania
FH	22	Tedo Abzhandadze
CE	23	Tornike Kakhoidze	(substituted on) 61'
Coach:
Richard Cockerill

FB	15	Jimmy O'Brien
RW	14	Tommy O'Brien
OC	13	Jamie Osborne
IC	12	Stuart McCloskey	(yellow card) 78'
LW	11	Jacob Stockdale		(substituted off) 37'
FH	10	Sam Prendergast		(substituted off) 71'
SH	9	Craig Casey (c)		(substituted off) 71'
N8	8	Gavin Coombes		(substituted off) 66'
OF	7	Nick Timoney
BF	6	Ryan Baird
RL	5	Darragh Murray
LL	4	Cormac Izuchukwu		(substituted off) 62'
TP	3	Tom Clarkson		(substituted off) 69'
HK	2	Gus McCarthy		(substituted off) 59'
LP	1	Jack Boyle		(substituted off) 59'
Substitutions:
HK	16	Tom Stewart		(substituted on) 59'
PR	17	Michael Milne		(substituted on) 59'
PR	18	Jack Aungier		(substituted on) 69'
LK	19	Thomas Ahern		(substituted on) 62'
FL	20	Max Deegan		(substituted on) 66'
SH	21	Ben Murphy		(substituted on) 71'
FH	22	Jack Crowley		(substituted on) 71'
WG	23	Calvin Nash		(substituted on) 36'
Coach:
Paul O'Connell

Assistant referees:
Adam Leal (England)
Ben Whitehouse (Wales)
Television match official:
Matteo Liperini (Italy)

Notes:

- Thomas Ahern, Jack Aungier, Michael Milne, Ben Murphy, Darragh Murray, Tommy O'Brien (all Ireland) made their international debuts.
- This was the first time that Georgia has hosted Ireland.

=== Second Test ===
12 July 2025
19:00 WEST (UTC+01)

Portugal	7–106	Ireland
Try: Martins 53' c Con: Aubry (1/1) 54'	Report	Try: McCloskey 1' c Gavin (2) 9' c, 40+2' c T. O'Brien (2) 11' c, 24' c Bolton (2) 13' c, 36' m Clarkson 32' c Casey 42' c Prendergast (2) 51' m, 60' c Nash 56' m Frawley 58' c Kendellen 73' c Murphy 79' c Penalty try 80+1'; Con: Crowley (12/15) 2', 10', 12', 14', 25', 33', 40+2', 43', 59', 61', 74', 80'

Estádio Nacional, Lisbon
Attendance: 8,000
Referee: Adam Leal (England)

FB	15	Nuno Sousa Guedes
RW	14	Simão Bento
OC	13	Vincent Pinto
IC	12	Tomás Appleton (c)	(substituted off) 22'
LW	11	Manuel Cardoso Pinto
FH	10	Hugo Aubry
SH	9	Hugo Camacho	(substituted off) 52'
N8	8	Diego Pinheiro	(substituted off) 64'
OF	7	Nicolas Martins
BF	6	David Wallis
RL	5	Pedro Ferreira	(substituted off) 61'
LL	4	António Rebelo de Andrade	(substituted off) 50'
TP	3	Diogo Hasse Ferreira	(substituted off) 40'
HK	2	Luka Begic	(substituted off) 40'
LP	1	David Costa	(substituted off) 57'
Substitutions:
PR	16	Abel da Cunha	(substituted on) 40'
HK	17	Pedro Santiago Lopes	(substituted on) 40'
PR	18	Martim Souto	(substituted on) 57'
LK	19	Guilherme Costa	(substituted on) 50'
FL	20	Francisco Almeida		(substituted on) 35'
FL	21	Vasco Baptista	(substituted on) 64'
SH	22	António Campos	(substituted on) 52'
CE	23	Gabriel Aviragnet	(substituted on) 22'	(substituted off) 35'
Coach:
Simon Mannix

FB	15	Jimmy O'Brien
RW	14	Tommy O'Brien	(substituted off) 52'
OC	13	Hugh Gavin
IC	12	Stuart McCloskey	(substituted off) 52'
LW	11	Shayne Bolton
FH	10	Jack Crowley
SH	9	Craig Casey (c)	(substituted off) 62'
N8	8	Cian Prendergast
OF	7	Alex Kendellen
BF	6	Ryan Baird	(substituted off) 52'
RL	5	Darragh Murray	(substituted off) 61'
LL	4	Thomas Ahern
TP	3	Tom Clarkson	(substituted off) 52'
HK	2	Gus McCarthy	(substituted off) 52'
LP	1	Jack Boyle	(substituted off) 52'
Substitutions:
HK	16	Tom Stewart	(substituted on) 52'
PR	17	Michael Milne	(substituted on) 52'
PR	18	Tom O'Toole	(substituted on) 52'
LK	19	Cormac Izuchukwu	(substituted on) 61'
FL	20	Max Deegan	(substituted on) 52'
SH	21	Ben Murphy	(substituted on) 62'
FH	22	Ciarán Frawley	(substituted on) 52'
WG	23	Calvin Nash	(substituted on) 52'
Coach:
Paul O'Connell

Assistant referees:
Anthony Woodthorpe (England)
Ben Whitehouse (Wales)
Television match official:
Matteo Liperini (Italy)

Notes:

- Francisco Almeida, Guilherme Costa (both Portugal), Shayne Bolton, Hugh Gavin and Alex Kendellen (all Ireland) made their international debuts.
- Portugal suffered their biggest Test defeat, which had previously been their 108–13 loss to New Zealand during the 2007 Rugby World Cup; the last time they had conceded more than 100 points in a Test match,
- Ireland recorded their largest Test win, surpassing their previous record, held since 2000, against the United States when they won 83–3.
- This was the first time Ireland had scored more than 100 points in a Test match.

== See also ==
- 2025 mid-year rugby union tests
- 2025 British & Irish Lions tour to Australia
