= St Augustine's College, Dungarvan =

Independent secondary school in Ireland

St Augustine's College

Location
- Dungarvan, County Waterford; Ireland

Information
- Type: Independent co-educational secondary
- Motto: Veritas, Caritas, Unitas
- Established: 1874
- Principal: John Keane
- Enrollment: 1,065 (2026)
- Campus: 43 acres (17 ha)
- Affiliations: Roman Catholic; Order of Saint Augustine
- Website: www.staugustines.ie

St Augustine's College is a co-educational secondary school in Dungarvan, County Waterford, Ireland. It was founded and is now conducted by the Irish Augustinians. The school has been located at its Duckspool campus, Abbeyside since 1972. This follows a long history of providing education at the former campus which was located at Main Street and Friary Street in Dungarvan town. At this time it was a boarding school for boys and continued as such at the new campus until 1990 when the decision was taken to become a co-educational facility. In time the boarding section was scaled down until it became a day school in the mid 1990s.

== Sports ==
The school participates in a number of different sports. The school's facilities include a 40 × 20 ft handball alley with glass back wall and viewing gallery, a 60 × 30 ft handball alley, a 120 × 60 ft gym, six GAA pitches, a soccer pitch, an 8-lane sprint track, a long & triple jump track, shot put, discus and hammer circles, an all-weather hockey pitch, and also facilities for the high jump, javelin, and pole vault events.

Since 1997, St Augustine's College in a European athletics event known as "Superschools". The college hosted the event in 1998 and 2008 and won both times. In the 24 years of the competition, St. Augustine's College have won nine times, eight of which have been consecutive – the only school in Europe to achieve this. Their most recent win was in 2018.

== Patron saint ==
The college is named in honour of the 4th-century saint, Augustine of Hippo. Other English-speaking Augustinian Schools with the same patron include Richland, New Jersey; San Diego, California – both in the United States; Manila in the Philippines; a school in Malta, another Irish one in New Ross, and one in Sydney, Australia.

== Notable alumni ==
- Thomas Ahern (born 2000) – rugby union player
- Tadhg de Búrca (born 1994) – hurler
- John Deasy (born 1967) – Fine Gael politician
- Mick Finn (1915–1987) – Gaelic footballer
- Dr. Liam Hennessy (born 1958) – athlete (pole vault), exercise physiologist, founder of Setanta College
- Kieran O'Mahony – Augustinian friar and biblical scholar
- Conor Prunty (born 1997) – hurler
- Matt Shanahan (born 1964) – independent TD for Waterford
