= 2024 Six Nations Championship squads =

Rugby union competition squads

This is a list of the complete squads for the 2024 Six Nations Championship, an annual rugby union tournament contested by the national rugby teams of England, France, Ireland, Italy, Scotland and Wales. Ireland were the defending champions and retained the title.

Note: Number of caps and players' ages are indicated as of 2 February 2024 – the tournament's opening day. For players added to a squad during the tournament, their caps and age are indicated as of the date of their call-up.

== England ==
On 17 January 2024, England head coach Steve Borthwick named a 36-player squad for the 2024 Six Nations Championship.

- Head coach: (England) Steve Borthwick

| Player | Position | Date of birth (age) | Caps | Club/province |
|---|---|---|---|---|
| Luke Cowan-Dickie | Hooker | 20 June 1993 (aged 30) | 41 | (England) Sale Sharks |
| Theo Dan | Hooker | 26 December 2000 (aged 23) | 7 | (England) Saracens |
| Jamie George (c) | Hooker | 20 October 1990 (aged 33) | 85 | (England) Saracens |
| Dan Cole | Prop | 9 May 1987 (aged 36) | 107 | (England) Leicester Tigers |
| Ellis Genge (vc) | Prop | 16 February 1995 (aged 28) | 58 | (England) Bristol Bears |
| Joe Heyes | Prop | 13 April 1999 (aged 24) | 7 | (England) Leicester Tigers |
| Joe Marler | Prop | 7 July 1990 (aged 33) | 88 | (England) Harlequins |
| Beno Obano | Prop | 25 October 1994 (aged 29) | 3 | (England) Bath |
| Will Stuart | Prop | 12 July 1996 (aged 27) | 33 | (England) Bath |
| Ollie Chessum | Lock | 6 September 2000 (aged 23) | 18 | (England) Leicester Tigers |
| Alex Coles | Lock | 21 September 1999 (aged 24) | 3 | (England) Northampton Saints |
| Nick Isiekwe | Lock | 20 April 1998 (aged 25) | 11 | (England) Saracens |
| Maro Itoje (vc) | Lock | 28 October 1994 (aged 29) | 76 | (England) Saracens |
| Chandler Cunningham-South | Back row | 18 March 2003 (aged 20) | 0 | (England) Harlequins |
| Ben Curry | Back row | 15 June 1998 (aged 25) | 5 | (England) Sale Sharks |
| Alex Dombrandt | Back row | 29 April 1997 (aged 26) | 15 | (England) Harlequins |
| Ben Earl | Back row | 7 January 1998 (aged 26) | 25 | (England) Saracens |
| Tom Pearson | Back row | 26 October 1999 (aged 24) | 1 | (England) Northampton Saints |
| Ethan Roots | Back row | 10 November 1997 (aged 26) | 0 | (England) Exeter Chiefs |
| Sam Underhill | Back row | 22 July 1996 (aged 27) | 30 | (England) Bath |
| Danny Care | Scrum-half | 2 January 1987 (aged 37) | 96 | (England) Harlequins |
| Alex Mitchell | Scrum-half | 25 May 1997 (aged 26) | 11 | (England) Northampton Saints |
| Ben Spencer | Scrum-half | 31 July 1992 (aged 31) | 4 | (England) Bath |
| George Ford (vc) | Fly-half | 16 March 1993 (aged 30) | 91 | (England) Sale Sharks |
| Fin Smith | Fly-half | 11 May 2002 (aged 21) | 0 | (England) Northampton Saints |
| Marcus Smith | Fly-half | 14 February 1999 (aged 24) | 30 | (England) Harlequins |
| Oscar Beard | Centre | 20 November 2001 (aged 22) | 0 | (England) Harlequins |
| Elliot Daly | Centre | 8 October 1992 (aged 31) | 64 | (England) Saracens |
| Fraser Dingwall | Centre | 7 April 1999 (aged 24) | 0 | (England) Northampton Saints |
| Ollie Lawrence | Centre | 18 September 1999 (aged 24) | 21 | (England) Bath |
| Henry Slade | Centre | 19 March 1993 (aged 30) | 57 | (England) Exeter Chiefs |
| Immanuel Feyi-Waboso | Wing | 20 December 2002 (aged 21) | 0 | (England) Exeter Chiefs |
| Tommy Freeman | Wing | 5 March 2001 (aged 22) | 3 | (England) Northampton Saints |
| Tom Roebuck | Wing | 7 January 2001 (aged 23) | 0 | (England) Sale Sharks |
| George Furbank | Fullback | 17 October 1996 (aged 27) | 6 | (England) Northampton Saints |
| Freddie Steward | Fullback | 5 December 2000 (aged 23) | 31 | (England) Leicester Tigers |

=== Call-ups ===
On 23 January 2024, Oscar Beard, Luke Cowan-Dickie and Ollie Lawrence withdrew from England's pre-tournament training camp, because of injury. They were replaced in the squad by Jamie Blamire, Max Ojomoh and Will Muir.

On 26 January 2024, Nick Isiekwe withdrew from England's pre-tournament training camp, because of illness. He was replaced in the squad by Charlie Ewels.

On 14 February 2024, George Martin and Manu Tuilagi were added to the England squad during the tournament's first fallow week, after recovering from injury.

On 18 February 2024, Alex Mitchell withdrew from the squad, ahead of England's third round fixture with Scotland, because of a knee injury. He was replaced by Harry Randall.

On 10 March 2024, Chandler Cunningham-South withdrew from the squad, ahead of England's fifth round fixture with France, because of a calf injury. He was replaced by Guy Pepper.

| Player | Position | Date of birth (age) | Caps | Club/province |
|---|---|---|---|---|
| Jamie Blamire | Hooker | 12 December 1997 (aged 26) | 6 | (England) Newcastle Falcons |
| Charlie Ewels | Lock | 29 June 1995 (aged 28) | 30 | (England) Bath |
| George Martin | Lock | 18 June 2001 (aged 22) | 9 | (England) Leicester Tigers |
| Guy Pepper | Back row | 21 April 2003 (aged 20) | 0 | (England) Newcastle Falcons |
| Harry Randall | Scrum-half | 18 December 1997 (aged 26) | 6 | (England) Bristol Bears |
| Max Ojomoh | Centre | 14 September 2000 (aged 23) | 0 | (England) Bath |
| Manu Tuilagi | Centre | 18 May 1991 (aged 32) | 59 | (England) Sale Sharks |
| Will Muir | Wing | 30 October 1995 (aged 28) | 0 | (England) Bath |

== France ==
On 17 January 2024, France head coach Fabien Galthié named a 34-player squad for the 2024 Six Nations Championship.

- Head coach: (France) Fabien Galthié

| Player | Position | Date of birth (age) | Caps | Club/province |
|---|---|---|---|---|
| Gaëtan Barlot | Hooker | 13 April 1997 (aged 26) | 7 | (France) Castres |
| Julien Marchand | Hooker | 10 May 1995 (aged 28) | 32 | (France) Toulouse |
| Peato Mauvaka | Hooker | 10 January 1997 (aged 27) | 29 | (France) Toulouse |
| Dorian Aldegheri | Prop | 4 August 1993 (aged 30) | 16 | (France) Toulouse |
| Uini Atonio | Prop | 26 March 1990 (aged 33) | 57 | (France) La Rochelle |
| Cyril Baille | Prop | 15 September 1993 (aged 30) | 47 | (France) Toulouse |
| Thomas Laclayat | Prop | 2 October 1997 (aged 26) | 1 | (France) Racing 92 |
| Sébastien Taofifénua | Prop | 21 March 1992 (aged 31) | 3 | (France) Lyon |
| Reda Wardi | Prop | 2 August 1995 (aged 28) | 14 | (France) La Rochelle |
| Paul Gabrillagues | Lock | 3 June 1993 (aged 30) | 16 | (France) Stade Français |
| Matthias Halagahu | Lock | 15 August 2001 (aged 22) | 0 | (France) Toulon |
| Emmanuel Meafou | Lock | 12 July 1998 (aged 25) | 0 | (France) Toulouse |
| Romain Taofifénua | Lock | 14 September 1990 (aged 33) | 49 | (France) Lyon |
| Cameron Woki | Lock | 7 November 1998 (aged 25) | 27 | (France) Racing 92 |
| Esteban Abadie | Back row | 1 February 1997 (aged 27) | 0 | (France) Toulon |
| Grégory Alldritt (c) | Back row | 23 March 1997 (aged 26) | 45 | (France) La Rochelle |
| Paul Boudehent | Back row | 21 November 1999 (aged 24) | 6 | (France) La Rochelle |
| François Cros | Back row | 25 March 1994 (aged 29) | 27 | (France) Toulouse |
| Anthony Jelonch | Back row | 28 July 1996 (aged 27) | 29 | (France) Toulouse |
| Charles Ollivon | Back row | 11 May 1993 (aged 30) | 39 | (France) Toulon |
| Nolann Le Garrec | Scrum-half | 14 May 2002 (aged 21) | 0 | (France) Racing 92 |
| Maxime Lucu | Scrum-half | 12 January 1993 (aged 31) | 18 | (France) Bordeaux-Bègles |
| Antoine Gibert | Fly-half | 31 December 1997 (aged 26) | 0 | (France) Racing 92 |
| Matthieu Jalibert | Fly-half | 6 November 1998 (aged 25) | 30 | (France) Bordeaux-Bègles |
| Jonathan Danty | Centre | 7 October 1992 (aged 31) | 26 | (France) La Rochelle |
| Nicolas Depoortère | Centre | 13 January 2003 (aged 21) | 0 | (France) Bordeaux-Bègles |
| Gaël Fickou | Centre | 26 March 1994 (aged 29) | 85 | (France) Racing 92 |
| Émilien Gailleton | Centre | 13 July 2003 (aged 20) | 1 | (France) Pau |
| Yoram Moefana | Centre | 18 July 2000 (aged 23) | 23 | (France) Bordeaux-Bègles |
| Louis Bielle-Biarrey | Wing | 16 June 2003 (aged 20) | 7 | (France) Bordeaux-Bègles |
| Matthis Lebel | Wing | 25 March 1999 (aged 24) | 5 | (France) Toulouse |
| Damian Penaud | Wing | 25 September 1996 (aged 27) | 48 | (France) Bordeaux-Bègles |
| Melvyn Jaminet | Fullback | 30 June 1999 (aged 24) | 19 | (France) Toulon |
| Thomas Ramos | Fullback | 23 July 1995 (aged 28) | 31 | (France) Toulouse |

=== Call-ups ===
On 22 January 2024, Anthony Jelonch and Emmanuel Meafou withdrew injured after sustaining damages in an Investec Champions Cup game against Bath the day before and were replaced by uncapped Alexandre Roumat and veteran Paul Willemse.

On 28 January 2024, Posolo Tuilagi and Lenni Nouchi were called up to the squad, while Matthias Halagahu and Roumat were released. Léo Barré was also called up, due to an injury to Melvyn Jaminet.

On 4 February 2024, Dany Priso was added to the squad, after Reda Wardi was ruled out of the rest of the tournament with a fractured wrist, which was suffered during the opening round match against Ireland.

On 15 February 2024, Marko Gazzotti was added to the squad.

On 10 March 2024, Antoine Frisch was called up to the squad, in place of the suspended Jonathan Danty.

| Player | Position | Date of birth (age) | Caps | Club/province |
|---|---|---|---|---|
| Dany Priso | Prop | 2 January 1994 (aged 30) | 18 | (France) Toulon |
| Posolo Tuilagi | Lock | 28 July 2004 (aged 19) | 0 | (France) Perpignan |
| Paul Willemse | Lock | 13 November 1992 (aged 31) | 31 | (France) Montpellier |
| Marko Gazzotti | Back row | 24 September 2004 (aged 19) | 0 | (France) Bordeaux-Bègles |
| Lenni Nouchi | Back row | 24 November 2003 (aged 20) | 0 | (France) Montpellier |
| Alexandre Roumat | Back row | 27 June 1997 (aged 26) | 0 | (France) Toulouse |
| Antoine Frisch | Centre | 1 June 1996 (aged 27) | 0 | (Ireland) Munster |
| Léo Barré | Fullback | 20 August 2002 (aged 21) | 0 | (France) Stade Français |

== Ireland ==
On 17 January 2024, Ireland head coach Andy Farrell named a 34-player squad for the 2024 Six Nations Championship.

- Head coach: (England) Andy Farrell

| Player | Position | Date of birth (age) | Caps | Club/province |
|---|---|---|---|---|
| Rónan Kelleher | Hooker | 24 January 1998 (aged 26) | 31 | (Ireland) Leinster |
| Dan Sheehan | Hooker | 17 September 1998 (aged 25) | 26 | (Ireland) Leinster |
| Tom Stewart | Hooker | 11 January 2001 (aged 23) | 2 | (Ireland) Ulster |
| Finlay Bealham | Prop | 9 October 1991 (aged 32) | 40 | (Ireland) Connacht |
| Tadhg Furlong | Prop | 14 November 1992 (aged 31) | 76 | (Ireland) Leinster |
| Cian Healy | Prop | 7 October 1987 (aged 36) | 129 | (Ireland) Leinster |
| Jeremy Loughman | Prop | 22 July 1995 (aged 28) | 5 | (Ireland) Munster |
| Tom O'Toole | Prop | 23 September 1998 (aged 25) | 13 | (Ireland) Ulster |
| Andrew Porter | Prop | 16 January 1996 (aged 28) | 64 | (Ireland) Leinster |
| Ryan Baird | Lock | 26 July 1999 (aged 24) | 20 | (Ireland) Leinster |
| Tadhg Beirne | Lock | 8 January 1992 (aged 32) | 50 | (Ireland) Munster |
| Iain Henderson | Lock | 21 February 1992 (aged 31) | 81 | (Ireland) Ulster |
| Joe McCarthy | Lock | 26 March 2001 (aged 22) | 10 | (Ireland) Leinster |
| James Ryan | Lock | 24 July 1996 (aged 27) | 62 | (Ireland) Leinster |
| Jack Conan | Back row | 29 July 1992 (aged 31) | 46 | (Ireland) Leinster |
| Caelan Doris | Back row | 2 April 1998 (aged 25) | 41 | (Ireland) Leinster |
| Peter O'Mahony (c) | Back row | 17 September 1989 (aged 34) | 105 | (Ireland) Munster |
| Nick Timoney | Back row | 1 August 1995 (aged 28) | 3 | (Ireland) Ulster |
| Josh van der Flier | Back row | 25 April 1993 (aged 30) | 62 | (Ireland) Leinster |
| Craig Casey | Scrum-half | 19 April 1999 (aged 24) | 14 | (Ireland) Munster |
| Jamison Gibson-Park | Scrum-half | 23 February 1992 (aged 31) | 35 | (Ireland) Leinster |
| Conor Murray | Scrum-half | 20 April 1989 (aged 34) | 116 | (Ireland) Munster |
| Harry Byrne | Fly-half | 22 April 1999 (aged 24) | 4 | (Ireland) Leinster |
| Jack Crowley | Fly-half | 13 January 2000 (aged 24) | 14 | (Ireland) Munster |
| Ciarán Frawley | Fly-half | 4 December 1997 (aged 26) | 4 | (Ireland) Leinster |
| Bundee Aki | Centre | 7 April 1990 (aged 33) | 56 | (Ireland) Connacht |
| Robbie Henshaw | Centre | 12 June 1993 (aged 30) | 72 | (Ireland) Leinster |
| Stuart McCloskey | Centre | 6 August 1992 (aged 31) | 17 | (Ireland) Ulster |
| Garry Ringrose | Centre | 26 January 1995 (aged 29) | 58 | (Ireland) Leinster |
| Jordan Larmour | Wing | 10 June 1997 (aged 26) | 32 | (Ireland) Leinster |
| James Lowe | Wing | 8 July 1992 (aged 31) | 31 | (Ireland) Leinster |
| Calvin Nash | Wing | 8 August 1997 (aged 26) | 6 | (Ireland) Munster |
| Jacob Stockdale | Wing | 3 April 1996 (aged 27) | 37 | (Ireland) Ulster |
| Hugo Keenan | Fullback | 18 June 1996 (aged 27) | 39 | (Ireland) Leinster |

=== Call-ups ===
On 18 February 2024, Thomas Ahern and Oli Jager were called up to the squad as injury cover.

| Player | Position | Date of birth (age) | Caps | Club/province |
|---|---|---|---|---|
| Oli Jager | Prop | 5 July 1995 (aged 28) | 0 | (Ireland) Munster |
| Thomas Ahern | Lock | 22 February 2000 (aged 23) | 0 | (Ireland) Munster |

== Italy ==
On 16 January 2024, Italy head coach Gonzalo Quesada named a 36-player squad for the 2024 Six Nations Championship.

- Head coach: (Argentina) Gonzalo Quesada

| Player | Position | Date of birth (age) | Caps | Club/province |
|---|---|---|---|---|
| Gianmarco Lucchesi | Hooker | 10 September 2000 (aged 23) | 17 | (Italy) Benetton |
| Marco Manfredi | Hooker | 18 September 1997 (aged 26) | 3 | (Italy) Zebre Parma |
| Giacomo Nicotera | Hooker | 15 July 1996 (aged 27) | 18 | (Italy) Benetton |
| Pietro Ceccarelli | Prop | 16 February 1992 (aged 31) | 31 | (France) Perpignan |
| Danilo Fischetti | Prop | 26 January 1998 (aged 26) | 36 | (Italy) Zebre Parma |
| Matteo Nocera | Prop | 16 January 1999 (aged 25) | 0 | (Italy) Zebre Parma |
| Luca Rizzoli | Prop | 3 May 2002 (aged 21) | 0 | (Italy) Zebre Parma |
| Mirco Spagnolo | Prop | 2 January 2001 (aged 23) | 0 | (Italy) Benetton |
| Giosuè Zilocchi | Prop | 15 January 1997 (aged 27) | 16 | (Italy) Benetton |
| Niccolò Cannone | Lock | 17 May 1998 (aged 25) | 36 | (Italy) Benetton |
| Riccardo Favretto | Lock | 18 October 2001 (aged 22) | 1 | (Italy) Benetton |
| Edoardo Iachizzi | Lock | 26 May 1998 (aged 25) | 6 | (Italy) Benetton |
| Federico Ruzza | Lock | 4 August 1994 (aged 29) | 50 | (Italy) Benetton |
| Andrea Zambonin | Lock | 3 September 2000 (aged 23) | 3 | (Italy) Zebre Parma |
| Lorenzo Cannone | Back row | 28 January 2001 (aged 23) | 16 | (Italy) Benetton |
| Alessandro Izekor | Back row | 5 March 2000 (aged 23) | 0 | (Italy) Benetton |
| Michele Lamaro (c) | Back row | 3 June 1998 (aged 25) | 33 | (Italy) Benetton |
| Sebastian Negri | Back row | 30 June 1994 (aged 29) | 52 | (Italy) Benetton |
| Ross Vintcent | Back row | 5 June 2002 (aged 21) | 0 | (England) Exeter Chiefs |
| Manuel Zuliani | Back row | 26 April 2000 (aged 23) | 17 | (Italy) Benetton |
| Alessandro Garbisi | Scrum-half | 11 April 2002 (aged 21) | 5 | (Italy) Benetton |
| Martin Page-Relo | Scrum-half | 6 January 1999 (aged 25) | 4 | (France) Lyon |
| Stephen Varney | Scrum-half | 16 May 2001 (aged 22) | 24 | (England) Gloucester |
| Tommaso Allan | Fly-half | 26 April 1993 (aged 30) | 79 | (France) Perpignan |
| Paolo Garbisi | Fly-half | 26 April 2000 (aged 23) | 31 | (France) Montpellier |
| Ignacio Brex | Centre | 26 May 1992 (aged 31) | 30 | (Italy) Benetton |
| Tommaso Menoncello | Centre | 20 August 2002 (aged 21) | 13 | (Italy) Benetton |
| Federico Mori | Centre | 13 October 2000 (aged 23) | 13 | (France) Bayonne |
| Marco Zanon | Centre | 3 October 1997 (aged 26) | 15 | (Italy) Benetton |
| Pierre Bruno | Wing | 28 June 1996 (aged 27) | 15 | (Italy) Zebre Parma |
| Simone Gesi | Wing | 23 May 2001 (aged 22) | 1 | (Italy) Zebre Parma |
| Monty Ioane | Wing | 30 October 1994 (aged 29) | 25 | (France) Lyon |
| Ange Capuozzo | Fullback | 30 April 1999 (aged 24) | 16 | (France) Toulouse |
| Lorenzo Pani | Fullback | 4 July 2002 (aged 21) | 5 | (Italy) Zebre Parma |

=== Call-ups ===
On 5 February 2024, Matteo Canali and Leonardo Marin were added to the squad as injury cover.

On 14 February 2024, Simone Ferrari, Louis Lynagh and François Carlo Mey were called up, following further injuries to the original squad.

On 28 February 2024, Marco Riccioni was added to the squad.

On 5 March 2024, Marco Manfredi withdrew from the squad, ahead of Italy's fourth round fixture with Scotland, because of a calf injury. He was replaced by Luca Bigi.

| Player | Position | Date of birth (age) | Caps | Club/province |
|---|---|---|---|---|
| Luca Bigi | Hooker | 19 April 1991 (aged 32) | 48 | (Italy) Zebre Parma |
| Simone Ferrari | Prop | 28 March 1994 (aged 29) | 50 | (Italy) Benetton |
| Marco Riccioni | Prop | 19 October 1997 (aged 26) | 26 | (England) Saracens |
| Matteo Canali | Lock | 11 September 1998 (aged 25) | 0 | (Italy) Zebre Parma |
| Leonardo Marin | Fly-half | 23 February 2002 (aged 21) | 6 | (Italy) Benetton |
| Louis Lynagh | Wing | 3 December 2000 (aged 23) | 0 | (England) Harlequins |
| François Carlo Mey | Fullback | 1 July 2003 (aged 20) | 0 | (France) Clermont |

== Scotland ==
On 16 January 2024, Scotland head coach Gregor Townsend named a 39-player squad for the 2024 Six Nations Championship.

- Head coach: (Scotland) Gregor Townsend

| Player | Position | Date of birth (age) | Caps | Club/province |
|---|---|---|---|---|
| Ewan Ashman | Hooker | 3 April 2000 (aged 23) | 12 | (Scotland) Edinburgh |
| Johnny Matthews | Hooker | 5 July 1993 (aged 30) | 1 | (Scotland) Glasgow Warriors |
| George Turner | Hooker | 8 October 1992 (aged 31) | 40 | (Scotland) Glasgow Warriors |
| Jamie Bhatti | Prop | 8 September 1993 (aged 30) | 34 | (Scotland) Glasgow Warriors |
| Zander Fagerson | Prop | 19 January 1996 (aged 28) | 62 | (Scotland) Glasgow Warriors |
| Alec Hepburn | Prop | 30 March 1993 (aged 30) | 0 | (England) Exeter Chiefs |
| Will Hurd | Prop | 29 June 1999 (aged 24) | 0 | (England) Leicester Tigers |
| WP Nel | Prop | 30 April 1986 (aged 37) | 61 | (Scotland) Edinburgh |
| Pierre Schoeman | Prop | 7 May 1994 (aged 29) | 26 | (Scotland) Edinburgh |
| Scott Cummings | Lock | 3 December 1996 (aged 27) | 33 | (Scotland) Glasgow Warriors |
| Grant Gilchrist | Lock | 9 August 1990 (aged 33) | 67 | (Scotland) Edinburgh |
| Richie Gray | Lock | 24 August 1989 (aged 34) | 78 | (Scotland) Glasgow Warriors |
| Sam Skinner | Lock | 31 January 1995 (aged 29) | 30 | (Scotland) Edinburgh |
| Glen Young | Lock | 4 November 1994 (aged 29) | 3 | (Scotland) Edinburgh |
| Josh Bayliss | Back row | 18 September 1997 (aged 26) | 5 | (England) Bath |
| Andy Christie | Back row | 22 March 1999 (aged 24) | 4 | (England) Saracens |
| Luke Crosbie | Back row | 22 April 1997 (aged 26) | 7 | (Scotland) Edinburgh |
| Rory Darge (cc) | Back row | 23 February 2000 (aged 23) | 15 | (Scotland) Glasgow Warriors |
| Jack Dempsey | Back row | 12 April 1994 (aged 29) | 15 | (Scotland) Glasgow Warriors |
| Matt Fagerson | Back row | 16 July 1998 (aged 25) | 40 | (Scotland) Glasgow Warriors |
| Jamie Ritchie | Back row | 16 August 1996 (aged 27) | 46 | (Scotland) Edinburgh |
| George Horne | Scrum-half | 12 May 1995 (aged 28) | 26 | (Scotland) Glasgow Warriors |
| Ali Price | Scrum-half | 12 May 1993 (aged 30) | 66 | (Scotland) Edinburgh |
| Ben White | Scrum-half | 27 May 1998 (aged 25) | 18 | (France) Toulon |
| Adam Hastings | Fly-half | 5 October 1996 (aged 27) | 27 | (England) Gloucester |
| Ben Healy | Fly-half | 29 June 1999 (aged 24) | 4 | (Scotland) Edinburgh |
| Finn Russell (cc) | Fly-half | 23 September 1992 (aged 31) | 75 | (England) Bath |
| Rory Hutchinson | Centre | 29 January 1996 (aged 28) | 8 | (England) Northampton Saints |
| Huw Jones | Centre | 17 December 1993 (aged 30) | 43 | (Scotland) Glasgow Warriors |
| Stafford McDowall | Centre | 24 February 1998 (aged 25) | 1 | (Scotland) Glasgow Warriors |
| Cameron Redpath | Centre | 23 December 1999 (aged 24) | 9 | (England) Bath |
| Sione Tuipulotu | Centre | 12 February 1997 (aged 26) | 22 | (Scotland) Glasgow Warriors |
| Darcy Graham | Wing | 21 June 1997 (aged 26) | 39 | (Scotland) Edinburgh |
| Arron Reed | Wing | 10 July 1999 (aged 24) | 0 | (England) Sale Sharks |
| Kyle Rowe | Wing | 8 February 1998 (aged 25) | 1 | (Scotland) Glasgow Warriors |
| Kyle Steyn | Wing | 29 January 1994 (aged 30) | 15 | (Scotland) Glasgow Warriors |
| Duhan van der Merwe | Wing | 4 June 1995 (aged 28) | 34 | (Scotland) Edinburgh |
| Blair Kinghorn | Fullback | 18 January 1997 (aged 27) | 50 | (France) Toulouse |
| Harry Paterson | Fullback | 28 June 2001 (aged 22) | 0 | (Scotland) Edinburgh |

=== Call-ups ===
On 21 January 2024, Darcy Graham was ruled out of the first two rounds of the tournament. As cover, Ross McCann was called up into the squad.

On 23 January 2024, Will Hurd and Adam Hastings both departed the squad after sustaining injuries. To replace Hurd, Elliot Millar-Mills was called up into the squad.

On 29 January 2024, Javan Sebastian and Ross Thompson were added to the squad as injury cover.

On 19 February 2024, Josh Bayliss, Ross McCann and Javan Sebastian were released from the squad, ahead of Scotland's third round fixture with England. They were replaced by Magnus Bradbury, Alex Craig and Hamish Watson.

On 4 March 2024, Alex Craig and WP Nel were released from the squad, ahead of Scotland's fourth round fixture with Italy. They were replaced by Jamie Dobie, Rory Sutherland and Marshall Sykes.

On 11 March 2024, Jamie Bhatti, Hamish Watson and Glen Young were released from the squad, ahead of Scotland's fifth round fixture with Ireland. They were replaced by Ally Miller, Alex Samuel and Max Williamson.

| Player | Position | Date of birth (age) | Caps | Club/province |
|---|---|---|---|---|
| Elliot Millar-Mills | Prop | 8 July 1992 (aged 31) | 0 | (England) Northampton Saints |
| Javan Sebastian | Prop | 2 September 1994 (aged 29) | 7 | (Scotland) Edinburgh |
| Rory Sutherland | Prop | 24 August 1992 (aged 31) | 29 | (France) Oyonnax |
| Alex Craig | Lock | 26 April 1997 (aged 26) | 2 | (Wales) Scarlets |
| Alex Samuel | Lock | 27 December 2002 (aged 21) | 0 | (Scotland) Glasgow Warriors |
| Marshall Sykes | Lock | 19 December 1999 (aged 24) | 1 | (Scotland) Edinburgh |
| Max Williamson | Lock | 5 August 2002 (aged 21) | 0 | (Scotland) Glasgow Warriors |
| Magnus Bradbury | Back row | 23 August 1995 (aged 28) | 19 | (England) Bristol Bears |
| Ally Miller | Back row | 10 May 1996 (aged 27) | 0 | (Scotland) Glasgow Warriors |
| Hamish Watson | Back row | 15 October 1991 (aged 32) | 59 | (Scotland) Edinburgh |
| Jamie Dobie | Scrum-half | 7 June 2001 (aged 22) | 2 | (Scotland) Glasgow Warriors |
| Ross Thompson | Fly-half | 10 April 1999 (aged 24) | 3 | (Scotland) Glasgow Warriors |
| Ross McCann | Wing | 30 August 1997 (aged 26) | 0 | (Scotland) Edinburgh |

== Wales ==
On 16 January 2024, Wales head coach Warren Gatland named his squad for the 2024 Six Nations Championship.

- Head coach: (New Zealand) Warren Gatland

| Player | Position | Date of birth (age) | Caps | Club/province |
|---|---|---|---|---|
| Elliot Dee | Hooker | 7 March 1994 (aged 29) | 46 | (Wales) Dragons |
| Ryan Elias | Hooker | 7 January 1995 (aged 29) | 38 | (Wales) Scarlets |
| Evan Lloyd | Hooker | 28 December 2001 (aged 22) | 0 | (Wales) Cardiff |
| Keiron Assiratti | Prop | 30 June 1997 (aged 26) | 2 | (Wales) Cardiff |
| Leon Brown | Prop | 26 October 1996 (aged 27) | 23 | (Wales) Dragons |
| Corey Domachowski | Prop | 9 November 1996 (aged 27) | 6 | (Wales) Cardiff |
| Archie Griffin | Prop | 24 July 2001 (aged 22) | 0 | (England) Bath |
| Kemsley Mathias | Prop | 29 July 1999 (aged 24) | 1 | (Wales) Scarlets |
| Gareth Thomas | Prop | 2 August 1993 (aged 30) | 26 | (Wales) Ospreys |
| Adam Beard | Lock | 7 January 1996 (aged 28) | 51 | (Wales) Ospreys |
| Dafydd Jenkins (c) | Lock | 5 December 2002 (aged 21) | 12 | (England) Exeter Chiefs |
| Will Rowlands | Lock | 19 September 1991 (aged 32) | 29 | (France) Racing 92 |
| Teddy Williams | Lock | 18 October 2000 (aged 23) | 1 | (Wales) Cardiff |
| Taine Basham | Back row | 22 February 1999 (aged 24) | 16 | (Wales) Dragons |
| James Botham | Back row | 25 February 1998 (aged 25) | 9 | (Wales) Cardiff |
| Alex Mann | Back row | 6 January 2002 (aged 22) | 0 | (Wales) Cardiff |
| Mackenzie Martin | Back row | 26 October 2003 (aged 20) | 0 | (Wales) Cardiff |
| Tommy Reffell | Back row | 27 April 1999 (aged 24) | 13 | (England) Leicester Tigers |
| Aaron Wainwright | Back row | 25 September 1997 (aged 26) | 43 | (Wales) Dragons |
| Gareth Davies | Scrum-half | 18 August 1990 (aged 33) | 74 | (Wales) Scarlets |
| Kieran Hardy | Scrum-half | 30 November 1995 (aged 28) | 18 | (Wales) Scarlets |
| Tomos Williams | Scrum-half | 1 January 1995 (aged 29) | 53 | (Wales) Cardiff |
| Sam Costelow | Fly-half | 1 October 2001 (aged 22) | 8 | (Wales) Scarlets |
| Cai Evans | Fly-half | 23 June 1999 (aged 24) | 1 | (Wales) Dragons |
| Ioan Lloyd | Fly-half | 5 April 2001 (aged 22) | 2 | (Wales) Scarlets |
| Mason Grady | Centre | 29 March 2002 (aged 21) | 6 | (Wales) Cardiff |
| George North | Centre | 13 April 1992 (aged 31) | 118 | (Wales) Ospreys |
| Joe Roberts | Centre | 10 May 2000 (aged 23) | 1 | (Wales) Scarlets |
| Nick Tompkins | Centre | 16 February 1995 (aged 28) | 32 | (England) Saracens |
| Owen Watkin | Centre | 12 October 1996 (aged 27) | 36 | (Wales) Ospreys |
| Josh Adams | Wing | 21 April 1995 (aged 28) | 53 | (Wales) Cardiff |
| Rio Dyer | Wing | 21 December 1999 (aged 24) | 14 | (Wales) Dragons |
| Tom Rogers | Wing | 17 December 1998 (aged 25) | 3 | (Wales) Scarlets |
| Cameron Winnett | Fullback | 7 January 2003 (aged 21) | 0 | (Wales) Cardiff |

=== Call-ups ===
On 6 February 2024, James Botham and Leon Brown were released from the Wales squad because of injury. They were replaced by Seb Davies and Dillon Lewis.

On 19 February 2024, Archie Griffin was released from the Wales squad because of injury. He was replaced by Harri O'Connor.

| Player | Position | Date of birth (age) | Caps | Club/province |
|---|---|---|---|---|
| Dillon Lewis | Prop | 4 January 1996 (aged 28) | 54 | (England) Harlequins |
| Harri O'Connor | Prop | 25 October 2000 (aged 23) | 0 | (Wales) Scarlets |
| Seb Davies | Lock | 17 May 1996 (aged 27) | 16 | (Wales) Cardiff |
