= Liam Hennessy (coach) =

Personal information
- Nationality: Irish
- Born: 26 May 1958 (age 68) Cappawhite, County Tipperary, Ireland

Sport
- Sport: Track and Field
- Event: Pole Vault
- College team: East Stroudsburg University of Pennsylvania New Mexico State University Thomond College of Education, Limerick University of Limerick
- Club: Limerick/ Tipperary Town

Achievements and titles
- Personal best: 4.96

Liam Hennessy is an exercise physiologist, strength and conditioning coach and former international athlete from Cappawhite, County Tipperary, Ireland, who competed in the pole vault, and has worked both with professional athletes and teams and as an academic researcher. He founded the distance learning institution Setanta College.

== Career ==
=== Athletics ===
Hennessy is a retired international athlete, who competed and holds records at the pole vault in international competition representing Ireland at more than 55 events, the first being at the age of 15. As of 2022 he is still listed amongst the best Irish performers in international competition. Hennessy broke his first Irish record in 1977. His Munster U-23 Men's Indoor record set in 1978 of 4.70 still stands as of 2022, with his career personal best at 4.96.

=== Coaching ===
Hennessy has worked with several GAA teams in nearly all codes of the game, including Tipperary GAA and its All-Ireland Senior Hurling Championship team of 1991.

He was Director of Fitness with the Irish Rugby Football Union (IRFU) for ten years, where he oversaw a number of Triple Crown (rugby union) wins and the Grand Slam (rugby union) Six Nations Championship win in 2009.

Hennessy was involved with a number of football clubs in England, Germany and Italy, including Blackburn Rovers F.C., Liverpool F.C., S.S. Lazio, and FC Bayern Munich.

He became National Jumps Coach in Ireland after he finished competing and also acted as Irish team manager at the first IAAF World Junior Championships in Athletics in Athens in 1985. Also, Hennessy has worked with many Irish Olympics Athletes throughout the years. At Atlanta 1996, he was the Chief Exercise Physiologist to the Irish Olympic Team.

Hennessy was part of Pádraig Harrington's coaching staff for his Major wins; The Open Championship 2007 & 2008 and PGA Championship in 2008.

=== Academic ===
Hennessy is a published author and researcher in the fields of exercise physiology and strength and conditioning. He published in British Journal of Sports Medicine, Sports Biomechanics, and The Journal of Strength and Conditioning Research Hennessy has studied at University of Limerick, East Stroudsburg University of Pennsylvania, New Mexico State University, and Loughborough University.

He founded Setanta College, a distance learning college, which offers sport related courses from Higher Certificate to Bachelor's Degree level. All of the college's qualifications are accredited by Quality and Qualifications Ireland (QQI). The college provides courses in strength and conditioning for both beginner and experienced coaches for several sports.

Hennessy worked in the Cardiopulmonary Department at the Blackrock Clinic, Dublin and also was a P.E. teacher at St Columba's College, Dublin. In 2003, Hennessy developed Club Energise, an isotonic drink.
