= Craig Casey =

Irish rugby union player

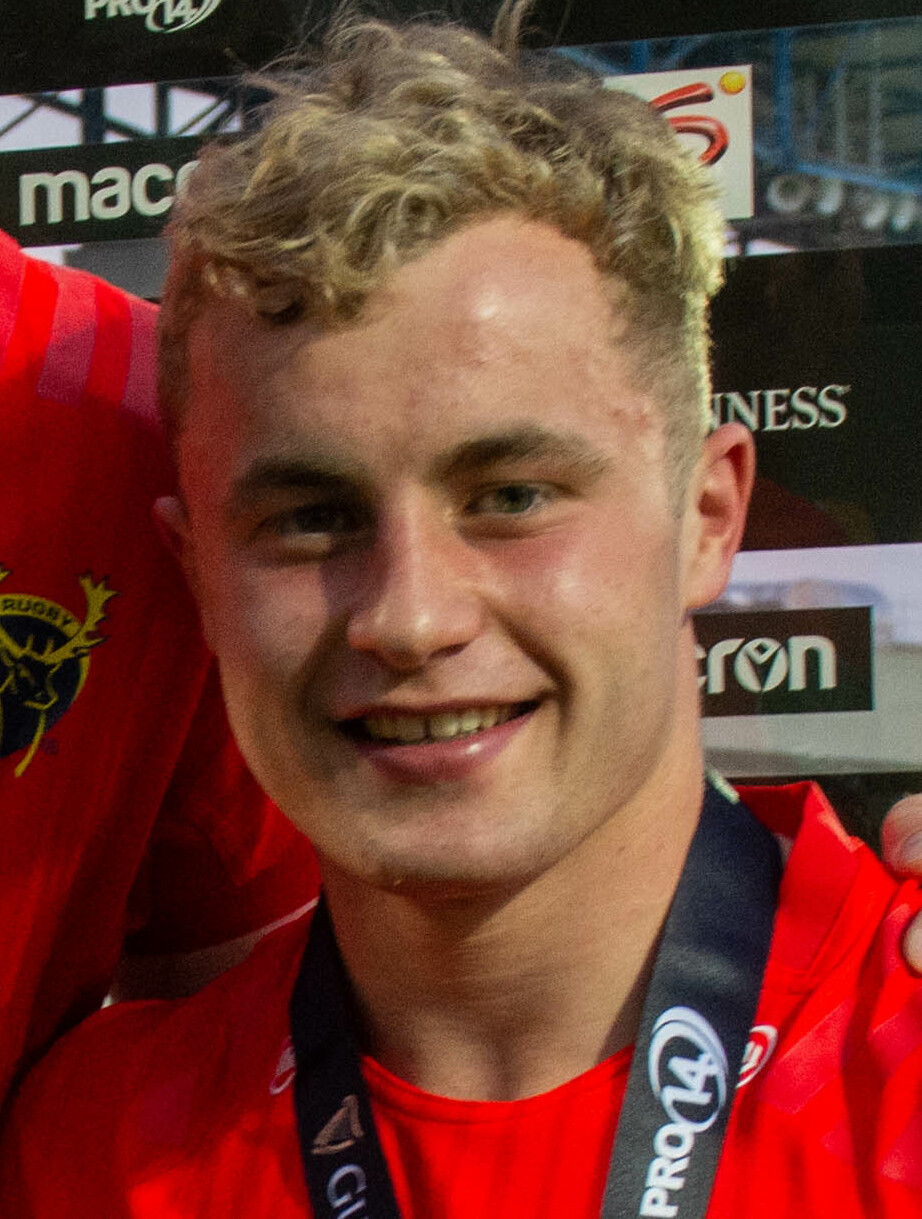
- Casey representing Munster during the Pro14 Rainbow Cup
- Full name: Craig Patrick Casey
- Born: 19 April 1999 (age 27) Limerick, Ireland
- Height: 1.65 m (5 ft 5 in)
- Weight: 76 kg (12.0 st; 168 lb)
- School: Ardscoil Rís
- Notable relative: Mossy Lawler (uncle)

Rugby union career
- Position: Scrum-half
Amateur team(s)
Years	Team	Apps	(Points)
2018–	Shannon		
Senior career
Years	Team	Apps	(Points)
2019–	Munster	119	(142)
- Correct as of 24 October 2026
International career
Years	Team	Apps	(Points)
2019	Ireland U20	7	(15)
2021–	Ireland	32	(17)
2022	Ireland A	1	(0)
- Correct as of 18 November 2026

Craig Patrick Casey (born 19 April 1999) is an Irish rugby union player who plays as a scrum-half for United Rugby Championship club Munster and the Ireland national team.

== Early life ==
Born in Limerick, Casey captained Ardscoil Rís to the semi-finals of the 2017 Munster Schools Rugby Senior Cup, and his performances saw him named in the Munster Schools top XV for 2017, as well as earning representation for Munster and Ireland at under-18 level. He is the nephew of former Shannon and Munster player Mossy Lawler.

== Munster ==
Casey joined the Munster academy ahead of the 2017–18 season, and won the John McCarthy Award for Academy Player of the Year in April 2019. Casey made his senior competitive debut for Munster in their 27–14 win against Connacht in round 21 of the 2018–19 Pro14 on 27 April 2019. Casey had been a late call-up to the bench for Munster after the starting scrum-half, Conor Murray, withdrew during the warm-up and Neil Cronin was promoted to the starting XV. He joined the provinces senior squad ahead of the 2019–20 season on a development contract, before progressing to a full contract ahead of the 2020–21 season.

Casey made his first start for Munster in their 19–14 away win against Connacht in round 8 of the 2019–20 Pro14 on 21 December 2019, and he made his European debut for the province in their 39–22 defeat away to French club Racing 92 in round 5 of the 2019–20 Champions Cup on 12 January 2020. One week later, Casey scored his first try for Munster in their 33–6 win against Welsh side Ospreys, in what was the provinces final pool fixture of the 2019–20 Champions Cup. He signed a two-year contract extension with the province in February 2021. Casey's performances for Munster throughout the 2020–21 season saw him win the clubs Young Player of the Year award. Casey was selected in the 2021–22 United Rugby Championship dream team following his performances for Munster during that season.

Casey signed a three-year contract extension with Munster in September 2022, and earned his 50th cap for the province when he started in their 21–5 home win against Italian side Zebre Parma in round three of the 2022–23 United Rugby Championship on 1 October 2022. He came on as a replacement in Munster's 19–14 win against the Stormers in the final of the 2022–23 United Rugby Championship on 27 May 2023.

== Ireland ==
Casey had been in contention for selection for Ireland under-20s during 2018, but a series of injuries ruled him out. Having overcome his injury issues, Casey was named as vice-captain in the under-20s squad for the 2019 Six Nations Under 20s Championship, and made three appearances, scoring two tries, during the tournament, which saw Ireland secure a grand slam victory for the first time since 2007. He was retained as vice-captain in the under-20s squad for the 2019 World Rugby Under 20 Championship when it was confirmed in May 2019.

When head coach Andy Farrell announced the Ireland squad for their two remaining 2020 Six Nations Championship fixtures in October, delayed due to the COVID-19 pandemic, Casey was one of six players who, though not being called up to the squad, would train alongside it. Casey earned his first senior international call up in January 2021, when Andy Farrell announced the Ireland squad for the 2021 Six Nations Championship, and he made his senior debut against Italy in round 3 on 27 February 2021, coming on as a replacement for Jamison Gibson-Park in Ireland's 48–10 away win. Ireland captain Johnny Sexton remarked after the game that Casey's attitude reminded him of former England fly-half Jonny Wilkinson.

Casey made his first start for Ireland in their mid-year test against the United States on 10 July 2021, which Ireland won 71–10, and featured off the bench in the 53–7 win against Argentina in Ireland's final fixture of the 2021 Autumn Nations Series on 21 November. Casey's only appearance in the 2022 Six Nations Championship came as a replacement during Ireland's 57–6 home win against Italy on 27 February. Ireland went to claim the Triple Crown after defeating Scotland 26–5 at home in the final round of the tournament on 19 March.

Casey was selected in the squad for the 2022 Ireland rugby union tour of New Zealand, and started in the uncapped match against the Māori All Blacks on 29 June, which ended in a 32–17 defeat for Ireland, and also started in the second uncapped match against the Māori All Blacks on 12 July, which ended in a 30–24 win for Ireland. He captained Ireland A in their 47–19 defeat against an All Blacks XV on 4 November 2022, and featured as a substitute for Ireland during their 35–17 win against Fiji on 12 November and their 13–10 win against Australia on 19 November during the 2022 Autumn Nations Series.

After Jamison Gibson-Park pulled out before kick-off due to injury, Casey was promoted to the bench for Ireland's opening fixture of the 2023 Six Nations Championship against Wales on 4 February, replacing Conor Murray during the second-half of Ireland's 34–10 away win. With Gibson-Park also ruled out of the round two fixture against France on 11 February, Casey retained his place on the bench and replaced Conor Murray during the second-half of Ireland's 32–19 win, before being promoted to the starting XV in Ireland's 34–20 away win against Italy in round three on 25 February. Ireland went on win the grand slam.

During the 2023 Rugby World Cup warm-up matches, Casey started for Ireland in their 33–17 win against Italy on 5 August but had to leave the field with an injury early in the second-half. He returned from injury to feature as a replacement in Ireland's 17–13 win against Samoa on 26 August and was selected in Ireland's 33-man squad for the 2023 Rugby World Cup. Casey made his World Cup debut for Ireland in their 59–16 win against Tonga in their second pool game on 16 September.

In November 2024, he scored his first conversion for Ireland. During their 2024 Autumn Nations Series fixture against Fiji, starting fly half Sam Prendergast was sin binned following a high tackle. In his absence, Casey successfully took the conversion following a try from Josh van der Flier before scoring a try himself as Ireland went on to win 52-17.

In February 2025, having been ruled out of the first two fixtures in the tournament through injury, he joined the senior training squad ahead of their fixture against Wales mid-way through the 2025 Six Nations. In June 2025, with many regular starters away with the British & Irish Lions for the 2025 tour to Australia, he was named captain for the 2025 summer tour. In July 2025, he made his first start as captain, scoring a try as Ireland defeated Georgia 34–5.

== Statistics ==
=== International analysis by opposition ===
Against	Played	Won	Lost	Drawn	Tries	Points	% Won
Australia	1	1	0	0	0	0	100
Argentina	1	1	0	0	0	0	100
Fiji	1	1	0	0	0	0	100
France	1	1	0	0	0	0	100
Italy	5	5	0	0	0	0	100
Japan	1	1	0	0	0	0	100
Samoa	1	1	0	0	0	0	100
South Africa	1	0	1	0	0	0	0
Tonga	1	1	0	0	0	0	100
United States	1	1	0	0	0	0	100
Wales	1	1	0	0	0	0	100
Total	15	14	1	0	0	0	93.33

Correct as of 11 August 2024

== Honours ==
=== Munster ===
- United Rugby Championship
  - Winner (1): 2022–23

=== Ireland under-20s ===
- Six Nations Under 20s Championship:
  - Winner (1): 2019
- Grand Slam:
  - Winner (1): 2019
- Triple Crown:
  - Winner (1): 2019

=== Ireland ===
- Six Nations Championship:
  - Winner (2): 2023, 2024
- Grand Slam:
  - Winner (1): 2023
- Triple Crown:
  - Winner (2): 2022, 2023

=== Individual ===
- Munster Academy Player of the Year:
  - Winner (1): 2018–19
- Munster Young Player of the Year:
  - Winner (1): 2020–21
- United Rugby Championship dream team:
  - Selected (1): 2021–22
