= Club (soft drink) =

Irish carbonated soft drinks brand

- Type: Carbonated soft drink
- Manufacturer: Britvic Ireland
- Origin: Ireland
- Introduced: 1930
- Variants: Club Zero

Club is the brand name for a series of Irish carbonated soft drinks produced in Ireland by Britvic Ireland and Cantrell & Cochrane (C&C). It is bottled by the Britvic plant in Dublin. The series includes Club Orange, Club Lemon, Club Rock Shandy (a mixture of the orange and lemon flavours) and Club Apple soft drinks.

== Ingredients ==
In the case of Club Orange, the ingredients are carbonated water, sugar, orange juice, citric acid, the preservative (sodium benzoate), the colours beta carotene and apocarotenal, and vitamin C (ascorbic acid). Club Orange includes fragments of fruit flesh (juice vesicles), referred to in marketing material as "bits", that remain in the glass after the drink has been consumed.

== Promotion ==
The previous advertising slogan of Club was "the bits inside make it come alive" although it was rarely seen on Club bottles and commercials. From 2009, the products slogan is "Some bits are crucial", making reference to its orange vesicles. Since 2011, the slogan has been "The Best Bits in the World".

== Product history ==
Club Orange, an orange flavoured carbonated drink, was the first orange fruit juice to appear on the Irish market. It was launched in the late 1930s, with the formula refined since then to its present state. The name Club derives from the Kildare Street Club in Dublin, which commissioned C&C to make an orange-flavoured drink. In 1960, Club Lemon was introduced as a sister product, and in the 2000s several other flavours were added to the range.

In 2004 C&C relaunched Club Lemon, which now also contains vesicles. Over the years a number of drinks have appeared under the Club label, including Club Orange and Cranberry, Club Berry, and Club Apple. Diet and sugar free versions were also produced.

In 2003 Club Energise was launched. Club Energise is an isotonic drink, marketed for sports recovery and rehydration. It was developed together with sports physiologist Liam Hennessy.

In early 2018, with the new lower-sugar formulation hitting shelves just ahead of the introduction of Ireland's Sugar Sweetened Drinks Tax (SSDT) on 1 May 2018, the brand altered its historic recipe by reducing sugar content from 17.5 g per 100 ml to 4.5 g leading to mixed consumer feedback
