= Setanta College =

Coordinates: 52.68725°N 7.82428°W

- Type: Private
- Established: 1999
- Affiliations: Higher Education and Training Awards Council, Quality and Qualifications Ireland (QQI), Distance Education Accrediting Commission (DEAC), National Strength and Conditioning Association (NSCA), Chartered Institute for the Management of Sport and Physical Activity (CIMSPA)
- Chancellor: Prof Liam Hennessy (coach) PhD
- Chief Executive: Seán Hogan
- Location: Ireland, United Kingdom, Italy, South Africa, United States of America, India
- Campus: Distance learning
- Website: www.setantacollege.com

Setanta College is a distance learning college, with a focus on programmes in the broad area of human development and performance. It offers internationally accredited qualifications, ranging from Higher Certificate to Master's degree level. The college is primarily web-based but has also offered campus-based programmes through its institutional partnerships. Other teaching locations include London, UK, Karnataka, India, and Pennsylvania and Florida in the United States.

== History ==
Setanta College was founded by Liam Hennessy BA, MSc, PhD, FRAMI, a former international pole vault competitor and record holder. Hennessy is an exercise physiologist and strength and conditioning coach whose work has been published in scientific journals and has worked with European soccer club teams in Italy, and Germany, the Irish Rugby Football Union (IRFU), the Irish Olympic Team, Tipperary GAA, and as Fitness coach to three time Major winning golfer Pádraig Harrington. Through his own work, Hennessy believed there was a need for better qualified experts in the area of strength and conditioning, and so designed a course that would concentrate on this area of expertise.

In 2019 Setanta College entered a partnership with Irish American University (IAU) that saw the graduate programmes accredited regionally by IAU.

== Other courses ==
Setanta College has designed and operates or facilitates courses for the Irish National Teachers' Organisation and World Rugby. In addition to these courses, Setanta College has delivered education programmes to coaches at the National Cricket Academy of Board of Control for Cricket in India (BCCI) and to other sporting organisations such as Saracens Rugby and Arsenal F.C.

== Education partners ==
- Gaelic Players Association (GPA)
- Irish National Teachers' Organisation (INTO)
- World Rugby
- Irish Rugby Football Union (IRFU)
- Rugby Players Ireland
- Irish Amateur Weightlifting Association (IAWLA)
- Titleist Performance Institute (TPI)
- The Irish Institute of Sport, a subsidiary of the Irish Sports Council, the state agency for sports development.
- Saracens F.C.
- Pádraig Harrington – Ambassador of the college
- Football Association of Ireland
- Irish Wheelchair Association-Sport
- Inspire Institute of Sport, an elite training facility in India
- Houston Astros
- Washington Nationals
- Philadelphia Phillies
- World Academy of Sport (WAoS) with World Olympians Association

== Alumni ==
- Tommy Dunne – former Tipperary GAA hurling player and captain, All-Ireland Senior Hurling Championship winner 2001.
- Tommy Carr – former Dublin GAA Gaelic Football player and manager, also former football manager of Roscommon GAA and Cavan GAA.
- Mick Dempsey – former Laois GAA footballer and current member of management team for the all-conquering Kilkenny GAA hurling team.
- Declan Meehan – Former Galway GAA Gaelic Footballer, winner of 2 All-Ireland Senior Football Championships and 2 GAA GPA All Stars Awards.
- Johnny O'Connor – Irish International and Connacht Rugby player. Also previously played with London Wasps
- Nicholas Walsh – Former Cavan GAA Gaelic Footballer and Melbourne Football Club Australian rules football player. Current coach of Greater Western Sydney Giants AFL team
- Gavin Duffy – Irish International and Connacht Rugby Rugby Union player. Also previously played with Harlequins.
- Joe Gamble – Former Reading F.C. and Republic of Ireland international Soccer player.
- Liam Kearns – Former Limerick GAA and Laois GAA Gaelic Football manager
- Gavin O'Mahony – Limerick GAA Hurler.
- Derek Lyng – Kilkenny GAA Hurler and winner of 6 All-Irelands and 2 All-star award, current member of management team for Kilkenny GAA hurling team.
- BJ Botha – Munster Rugby and South Africa rugby player. Previously Ulster Rugby and Sharks. 2007 Rugby World Cup winner
- Aaron Dundon – Leinster Rugby player
- Marcus Horan – Former Munster Rugby and Irish International rugby union player.
- Charlie Hodgson – Saracens F.C., England and British and Irish Lions rugby player. Previously Sale Sharks
- Michael Clegg – Former Manchester United F.C. player and current Manchester United F.C. coach
- Louis Ludik – Ulster Rugby player. Previously Agen, Lions and Sharks
- Brian Doherty – Irish international and Royal Beerschot (Belgium) professional Field hockey player.
- Max Sorensen – Irish international and The Hills C.C. cricket player.
- Chris Baker (high jumper) – International athlete who represented Great Britain at the 2016 Summer Olympics.
- Ronan Boyce – professional footballer
