= Michael Milne =

Irish rugby union player (born 1999)

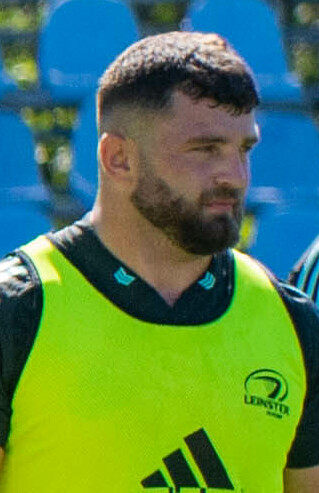
- Milne in 2022
- Born: 5 February 1999 (age 27) Crinkill, Birr, County Offaly, Ireland
- Height: 1.83 m (6 ft 0 in)
- Weight: 115 kg (18.1 st; 254 lb)
- School: Cistercian College

Rugby union career
- Position: Prop
Senior career
Years	Team	Apps	(Points)
2019–2025	Leinster	47	(60)
2025–	Munster	16	(20)
- Correct as of 03 October 2026
International career
Years	Team	Apps	(Points)
2019	Ireland U20	8	(5)
2025	Ireland	5	(5)
2025-	Ireland A	1	(5)
- Correct as of 14 March 2026

Michael Milne (born 5 February 1999) is an Irish rugby union player who came through the Leinster Rugby academy and became a member of the Leinster Senior Squad on 15 April 2021. He moved to provincial rivals Munster in April 2025. He normally plays as a loosehead prop

== Early life ==
Milne was born and raised in Crinkill, Birr, County Offaly and first began playing rugby aged five or six for Birr RFC. He attended Cistercian College and helped the school to their first ever Leinster Schools Rugby Senior Cup in 2015.

== Leinster ==
Milne made his senior competitive debut for Leinster in their opening fixture of the 2019–20 Pro14 season away to Italian side Benetton on 28 September 2019, which the province won 32–27.

== Munster ==
Michael Milne joined Munster rugby on a short term loan along with fellow Leinster player Lee Barron ahead of their permanent move to Munster the following season. Milne made his debut for Munster in their 2024-25 URC Round 16 fixture against Welsh side Cardiff on 25 April 2025, which the province lost 21-26

He subsequently scored his first try for Munster in the province's URC Round 17 victory against provincial rivals Ulster, helping the province to a 38-20 victory in Thomond Park. He then went on to start for Munster, in the final game of the regular season, in their URC Round 18 victory over Italian side Benetton.

Milne started in Munster's 2024/25 quarter final draw away to Sharks, which was decided in the first ever penalty shootout in the URC, with Munster losing five successful kicks to six.

== Ireland ==
Milne was part of the Ireland under-20s squad that won a grand slam during the 2019 Six Nations Under 20s Championship.

Milne was named in the Emerging Ireland squad that travelled to South Africa in September 2022 and featured against both the Pumas and Cheetahs.

On the 7 November 2022, Milne was called up to train with the Ireland squad for the Bank of Ireland Nations Series

On the 6 February 2023, Milne was called up to train with the Ireland squad for the 2023 Six Nations Championship following the continuing injury to Cian Healy.

On 5 July 2025, he made his debut for Ireland when he came on against Georgia in a 34-5 win during the 2025 tour of Georgia and Portugal.

== Honours ==
=== Cistercian College ===
- Leinster Schools Rugby Senior Cup:
  - Winner (1): 2015

=== Ireland Under-20s ===
- Six Nations Under 20s Championship:
  - Winner (1): 2019
- Grand Slam:
  - Winner (1): 2019
- Triple Crown:
  - Winner (1): 2019
