= Sam Prendergast =

Irish rugby union player

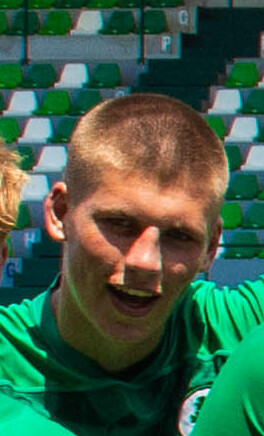
- Born: 12 February 2003 (age 23) Kildare, Ireland
- Height: 1.93 m (6 ft 4 in)
- Weight: 91 kg (14.3 st; 201 lb)
- School: Newbridge College
- University: TUD
- Notable relative(s): Cian Prendergast (brother), Orla Prendergast (sister)

Rugby union career
- Position: Fly-half
Senior career
Years	Team	Apps	(Points)
2022 -	Leinster	52	(324)
- Correct as of 28 June 2026
International career
Years	Team	Apps	(Points)
2022 - 2023	Ireland U20	14	(142)
2024	Emerging Ireland	3	(17)
2024 -	Ireland	20	(121)
- Correct as of 21 November 2026

Sam Prendergast (born 12 February 2003) is an Irish rugby union player who plays as a fly-half for Leinster Rugby and for the Ireland national rugby union team.

== Early life ==
Prendergast was born to Ciara and Mark, two members of Óglaigh na hÉireann (Irish Defence Forces). At the age of 5, Prendergast lived in Damascus with his family for a year and a half. He developed a friendship with future Newbridge, Leinster and Ireland U-20 teammate Diarmuid Mangan in Syria.

=== Underage Sporting Career ===
Prendergast grew up in Suncroft, Kildare. He was a talented multi-sportsman growing up. He won junior All-Irelands in the shot put and javelin for Suncroft AC. He also played underage soccer.

Prendergast played gaelic football for Suncroft GFC. He was involved in Kildare development squads from U-14 to U-17 before taking his place in the Leinster academy.

=== Underage Rugby ===
He began his rugby career at Cill Dara RFC and Newbridge RFC and attended Newbridge College in Newbridge, County Kildare where he played as a scrum-half before a growth spurt led to his switch to out-half.

He played in 2020 as the school secured a place in the Leinster Senior Schools Cup final against Clongowes Wood. However, the final was never played due to the COVID-19 pandemic.

He played AIL for Lansdowne FC and joined the Leinster Rugby academy in 2022.

== Club career ==
=== Senior ===
==== 2022-23 ====
Prendergast was selected for the Leinster first team in the United Rugby Championship against the Lions on Saturday April 15, 2023. He was awarded player of the match for his debut performance which involved successfully kicking six out of seven attempts including a late penalty with the scores tied to secure the win for his side. On the second leg of Leinster's South African tour, Prendergast scored one conversion as Leinster lost 62–7 to the Bulls.

In August 2023, Prendergast was promoted from an academy contract to his first senior contract.

==== 2023-24 ====
In May 2024, discussions took place for a move to Connacht on loan, where he would have the opportunity to play alongside his brother at club level and provide injury cover for JJ Hanrahan. Ultimately, he did not take up the opportunity.

==== 2024-25 ====
On 8 December 2024, he scored two tries and five conversions in the opening round of the 2024–25 Champions Cup as Leinster went to beat Bristol Bears 35–12 at Ashton Gate. The following week he won man of the match in the opening home game of the campaign beating Clermont Auvergne 15–7.

In March 2025, Prendergast renewed his Leinster contract.

Prendergast scored 10 points (2c, 2p) in the 2025 URC Grand Final. He won his first senior medal as Leinster defeated the Bulls 32–7 in Croke Park.

==== 2025-26 ====
Prendergast started Leinster's first game of the 2025-26 URC season as they were comprehensively beaten 35–0 by the Stormers. Prendergast started in Round 2 versus the Bulls. In a 39–31 loss, he scored 11 points.

== International career ==
=== Under-20 team ===
Prendergast kicked a late long-distance penalty to clinch a series victory for Ireland under-20s over England over-20s in July 2022. He kicked another late penalty in February 2023 as Ireland under-20s beat France under-20s in the 2023 Six Nations Under 20s Championship. He was singled out for praise for his performances during the tournament. Praise has also come from former Ireland international Andrew Trimble, former New Zealand international Sonny Bill Williams, and he was identified by BBC Sport as one of the stars of the 2023 under-20 Six Nations tournament. He was named in the Ireland squad for the 2023 World Rugby U20 Championship held in South Africa in June and July 2023.

=== Emerging Ireland ===
Prendergast was picked in an Emerging Ireland squad in October 2024 to play three test matches in the 2024 Toyota Challenge. He started all three matches against the Pumas, the Cheetahs and the Western Force.

=== Men's team ===
Prendergast was selected for the 2024 Six Nations squad as a training panellist, alongside Munster players Oli Jager and Thomas Ahern. The three did not participate in any test matches during the 2024 Six Nations Championship, however they were included in pre-tournament training camps.

==== 2024/25 ====
He was called up to the senior Ireland squad for the 2024 Autumn internationals. He made his senior debut as a second-half replacement for Ireland's match against Argentina on 15 November 2024. He was named in the starting XV for his first senior international start for Irelands match against Fiji on 23 November 2024. During his first international start, a 52–17 win, he was sin binned for a high tackle before scoring five conversions and having the opportunity to play alongside his brother for the first time at international level as he came off the bench.

On 1 February 2025, he made his tournament debut in the opening round of the 2025 Six Nations in a 27–22 win over England. In the following round he won man of the match during a 32–18 away victory over Scotland. Following this performance he won player of the round during a fan vote conducted by the tournament organisers. Prendergast contributed 17 points (1c, 5p) in the 27-18 round 3 win versus Wales. This win ensured Ireland won the Triple Crown. Ireland's hopes of a Grand Slam were ended in Round 4 as a result of a 42–27 loss to France in the Aviva Stadium. Prendergast scored 12 points (3c, 2p) in the losing effort. In the final round 22–17 win versus Italy, Prendergast came on as a second-half substitute.

Prendergast started against Georgia during Ireland's summer tests. In a 34–5 win, he scored 14 points (4c, 2p).

==== 2026/27 ====
In their first home match of the Nations Championship, Ireland beat Argentina 42-12. Prendergast scored 15 points including a try.

Prendergast contributed 6 points in the 43-15 defeat of Fiji. In the days after the match, Prendergast was cited for a hip-drop tackle on Peceli Yato. The citing committee determined that it did not meet the red card threshold thus clearing Prendergast to play the following week against South Africa.

In Irelands final home match of the Nations Championship, Prendergast scored 5 points as Ireland defeated South Africa 20-17.

== Statistics ==
=== Club summary ===
Year	Team	Played	Start	Sub	Tries	Cons	Pens	Drop	Points	Yel	Red
2022–23	Leinster	2	2	0	0	5	2	0	16	0	0
2023–24	Leinster	16	4	12	1	18	1	0	44	0	0
2024–25	Leinster	16	15	1	5	45	13	0	154	0	0
2025–26	Leinster	18	13	5	5	35	5	0	110	0	0
Career		52	34	18	11	103	21	0	324	0	0

as of 28 June 2026

=== International analysis by opposition ===
Opposition	Played	Win	Loss	Draw	Tries	Cons	Pens	Drop Goals	Points	Win %
Argentina	1	1	0	0	0	0	0	0	0	100%
Australia	2	2	0	0	0	3	1	1	12	100%
England	1	1	0	0	0	0	1	0	3	100%
Fiji	1	1	0	0	0	5	0	0	10	100%
France	2	0	2	0	0	5	2	0	16	0%
Georgia	1	1	0	0	0	4	2	0	14	100%
Italy	2	2	0	0	0	0	0	0	0	100%
Japan	1	1	0	0	0	2	0	0	4	100%
New Zealand	1	0	1	0	0	0	0	0	0	0%
Scotland	1	1	0	0	0	3	2	0	12	100%
South Africa	1	0	1	0	0	0	2	0	6	0%
Wales	1	1	0	0	0	1	5	0	17	100%
Career	12	10	2	0	0	21	15	1	90	76.92%

as of 14 February 2026

== Honours ==
Ireland

- Triple Crown
  - Winner (2): 2025, 2026

Leinster

- United Rugby Championship
  - Winner (2): 2024-25, 2025-26
- URC Irish Shield
  - Winner (4): 2022–23, 2023–24, 2024–25, 2025–26

Ireland Under 20's

- World Rugby Junior World Championship:
  - Runner-Up (1): 2023
- Six Nations Under 20s Championship:
  - Winner (1): 2023
- Grand Slam:
  - Winner (1): 2023
- Triple Crown:
  - Winner (1): 2023

Newbridge College

- Leinster Schools Rugby Senior Cup
  - Winner (1): 2020

Individual

- Irish Rugby Young Player of the Year
  - Winner (1): 2025
- Leinster Young Player of the Year
  - Winner (1): 2025
- Six Nations Rising Player of the Championship
  - Winner (1): 2025
- Six Nations U20 Player of the Championship
  - Winner (1): 2023

== Style of play ==
Gerry Thornley in The Irish Times compared Prendergast with Stephen Larkham due to his "tall, languid style and passing range".

He says that he has been heavily influenced by Johnny Sexton as he had watched him for years and is now helping at the Ireland camp for the flyhalfs.

== Personal life ==
He is the younger brother of Connacht and Ireland international Cian Prendergast.

He studied marketing at TUD.
