= Cian Prendergast =

Irish rugby union player

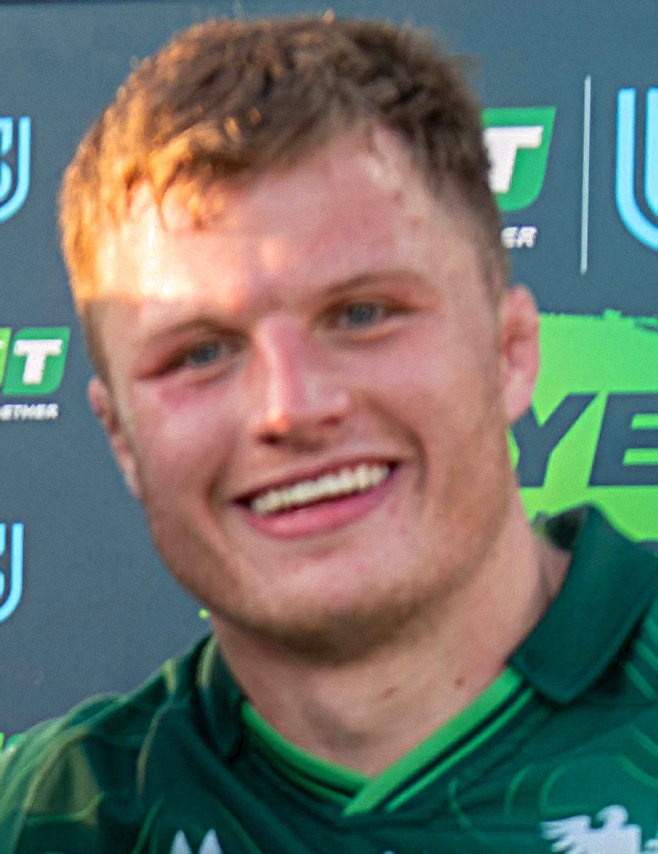
- Prendergast in 2025
- Born: 23 February 2000 (age 26) Kildare, Ireland
- Height: 1.96 m (6 ft 5 in)
- Weight: 112 kg (247 lb; 17 st 9 lb)
- School: Newbridge College
- Notable relative: Sam Prendergast (brother)

Rugby union career
- Position(s): Flanker, Number 8
- Current team: Connacht
Senior career
Years	Team	Apps	(Points)
2020–	Connacht	98	(105)
- Correct as of 20 March 2026
International career
Years	Team	Apps	(Points)
2020	Ireland U20	2	(0)
2022–	Ireland	10	(15)
2022	Ireland Wolfhounds	1	(0)
- Correct as of 4 July 2026

Cian Prendergast (born 23 February 2000) is an Irish professional rugby union player who plays as a flanker for United Rugby Championship club Connacht and the Ireland national team.

== Early life ==
Prendergast grew up in County Kildare and began playing rugby with Newbridge RFC at mini's level. He attended Newbridge College and captained both his school's Senior Cup team and the Leinster schools team in 2018. He also played Gaelic football for Suncroft.

Prendergast had hoped to play for his native province of Leinster but was told in April 2020 that there would be no place for him in the academy. Days after learning this, he was contacted by Connacht academy coach Eric Elwood, who offered him a contract. His younger brother Sam Prendergast is also a professional rugby player, currently playing for Leinster and Ireland.

== Professional career ==
=== Connacht ===
Prendergast joined the Connacht academy in summer 2020. The following October he made his senior debut in Round 3 of the 2020–21 Pro14 against Edinburgh. In March 2021, Connacht announced that he had signed a professional contract with the club. In May 2022, and with one year on his deal still to run, Connacht announced a new longer term contract to keep him at the club until 2025. In advance of the 2024/25 season, Prendergast was named club captain.

On the 3rd June 2026, Cian was named in the URC Team of the Season (Elite XV) for 2025/26, one of two Connacht players selected for this season.

=== Ireland ===
Prendergast was included as a development player in the Irish squad for the 2022 Six Nations. In June 2022, he was included in the Ireland squad for the 2022 tour of New Zealand. In November 2022, Prendergast was named on the bench and subsequently gained his first full cap in a test victory against Fiji.

In January 2023, he was named in Ireland's squad for that year’s Six Nations. The following August, Prendergast won his second cap off the bench against Italy and was then selected for his first international start at number eight against England.

He was left out of the 2024 Men's Six Nations squad, while there isn't a confirmed reason for this, its likely the inclusion of Ulster flanker Nick Timoney in the squad is what meant Prendergast missed selection. Despite him being capped in 2022, and then starting for Ireland last year against England in the 2023 Summer Nations Series. In November 2024, he came on as a replacement in Ireland's 52-17 win against Fiji in the 2024 Autumn Nations Series. His brother was also on the pitch at the time, making his first start at fly half making this the first time the two had played together at the same time at international level.

In February 2025, he was named on the bench to make his tournament debut in the 2025 Six Nations against Wales. However, before entering the field of play he withdrew from the match day squad through illness, being replaced by Ryan Baird.

On 5 February 2026, Prendergast started in the opening game of the 2026 Six Nations Championship against France alongside his brother in the starting team for the first time.

== Honours ==
- 2025/2026 URC Elite XV
