= Kieran O'Mahony =

Irish Augustinian friar and biblical scholar

Kieran J. O'Mahony OSA
- Born: 1951; Youghal, County Cork, Ireland
- Died: 18 August, 2026; Harold's Cross, Dublin, Ireland
- Education: St Augustine's College, Dungarvan, Pontifical Gregorian University, St. Patrick's College, Maynooth, Pontifical Biblical Institute, Trinity College, Dublin
- Occupations: Biblical scholar, Priest
- Website: https://Tarsus.ie

Kieran J. O'Mahony OSA, was an Irish Augustinian friar and biblical scholar, who served as the academic coordinator for the Roman Catholic Archdiocese of Dublin. He served as a priest in Donnybrook Parish. O'Mahony served as the Catholic Ecumenical canon in St Patrick's Cathedral, Dublin from 2012 until 2017.

== Life ==
O'Mahony attended St Augustine's College, Dungarvan, Co. Waterford, for his secondary studies, and went on to join the Augustinian Order at their Novitiate in Orlagh, Dublin in September 1969. After a year there he moved to Ballyboden, Dublin, studying at the Milltown Institutefor two years. He moved to Rome in the autumn of 1972 and studied at the Pontifical Gregorian University in Rome earning a Bachelor of Sacred Theology and the Licentiate of Sacred Theology. He then studied at St. Patrick's College, Maynooth where he earned an H.Dip. in Education. He also studied scripture at the Pontifical Biblical Institute in Rome. He gained PhD in Biblical studies from Trinity College, Dublin.

From 1990 to 2011 he lectured in scripture at the Milltown Institute of Theology and Philosophy. O'Mahony has published a number of books on theology and has spoken at religious conferences and summer schools.

O'Mahony founded the Tarsus.ie site on which many scripture resources, homilies, lectures and other scripture content is published. O'Mahony along with Jessie Rogers and Sean Goan, and supported by Maynooth College, The Tarsus Scripture School runs online programme for exploring the scriptures.

== Publications ==
- Hearers of the Word Praying and Exploring the Readings for Easter and Pentecost Year B, Messenger Publications (2021), ISBN 1788123557
- Hearers of the Word: Praying and Exploring the Readings for Advent and Christmas, Year B, Messenger Publications (2020), ISBN 1788122844
- Hearers of the Word: Praying and Exploring the Readings for Advent and Christmas Year A, Messenger Publications, (2019) ISBN 1788120957
