= Higher Certificate =

Newer higher education qualification

The Higher Certificate (Ardteastas in Irish) is a third-level education award at level 6 on the National Framework of Qualifications in the Republic of Ireland. The Higher Certificate is awarded by various Institutes of Technology. A Higher Certificate academic programme is two years of full-time study. Students can complete an additional (add-on) year to obtain the ordinary bachelor's degree (level 7 on the National Framework of Qualifications), and may then complete a further add-on year to obtain the Honours bachelor's degree (level 8 on the National Framework of Qualifications). The Higher Certificate is, in effect, a two-year undergraduate degree. The Higher Certificate should not be confused with the Advanced Certificate which is a two-year Post-Leaving Certificate (PLC) program of further education, typically delivered by community colleges, and is also awarded at level 6 on the National Framework of Qualifications and can be used to gain entry to a third level undergraduate program.

== Common Higher Certificates ==
English title	Irish title
Higher Certificate in Arts	Ardteastas Ealaíon
Higher Certificate in Business	Ardteastas Gnó
Higher Certificate in Engineering	Ardteastas Innealtóireachta
Higher Certificate in Science	Ardteastas Eolaíochta

== See also ==
- Education in the Republic of Ireland
