= Ryan Baird =

Ireland international rugby union player (born 1999)

- Born: 26 July 1999 (age 27) Dublin, Ireland
- Height: 1.98 m (6 ft 6 in)
- Weight: 104 kg (229 lb; 16 st 5 lb)
- School: St. Michael's College
- University: Trinity College Dublin

Rugby union career
- Position(s): Lock, Flanker
- Current team: Leinster
Senior career
Years	Team	Apps	(Points)
2019–	Leinster	78	(60)
- Correct as of 12 April 2025
International career
Years	Team	Apps	(Points)
2019	Ireland U20	4	(0)
2021–	Ireland	36	(15)
- Correct as of 21 November 2026

Ryan Baird (born 26 July 1999) is an Irish professional rugby union player who plays as a lock or as a flanker for United Rugby Championship club Leinster and the Ireland national team.

== Early life and education ==
Baird attended The High School for three years before moving to St Michael's College and, alongside Leinster teammate Scott Penny, was a standout performer during the 2018 Leinster Schools Rugby Senior Cup.

== Professional career ==
=== Leinster ===
Strong performances at school level saw Baird rewarded with a place in Leinster's academy ahead of the 2018–19 season, and he made his senior competitive debut for the province in their 14–13 defeat against Ulster during round 21 of the 2018–19 Pro14 on 27 April 2019. Baird played as a substitute for Leinster in September 2020 in a European Rugby Champions Cup match against Saracens, earning a place in the match day 23 ahead of Australian international Scott Fardy.

=== Ireland U20 ===
Baird was selected to play in the Ireland under-20s squad for the 2019 Six Nations Under 20s Championship, Baird made two substitute appearances during the tournament; against France and Wales, as Ireland secured their first grand slam in the tournament since 2007. He was retained in the under-20s squad for the 2019 World Rugby Under 20 Championship, and started in the 46–26 opening win against England, but, during the second pool fixture against Australia, Baird was shown a red card for a high tackle.

=== Ireland ===
In October 2020, he was named in the Ireland squad by coach Andy Farrell for the remaining matches of the 2020 Six Nations Championship. On 27 February 2021, Baird made his debut off the bench in a 10–48 victory over Italy in the third round of the 2021 Six Nations. He scored his first international try for Ireland in a 57–6 win over Italy during the 2022 Six Nations.

== Career statistics ==
=== List of international tries ===
Number	Position	Points	Tries	Result	Opposition	Venue	Date	Ref.
1	Lock	5	1	Won	Italy	Aviva Stadium	27 February 2022	

as of 1 March 2022

== Honours ==
Leinster

- Pro14 Champion (3): 2018/19, 2019/20, 2020/21
- URC Champion (1): 2024/25

Ireland

- 2x Six Nations Championship: 2023, 2024
- 2x Triple Crown: 2022, 2023, 2025
