= Thomas Ahern (rugby union) =

Irish rugby union player (born 2000)

- Born: 22 February 2000 (age 26) Ardmore, County Waterford, Ireland
- Height: 2.06 m (6 ft 9 in)
- Weight: 119 kg (18.7 st; 262 lb)
- School: St Augustine's College
- University: University of Limerick

Rugby union career
- Position: Lock
Amateur team(s)
| Years | Team | Apps | (Points) |
| 20??–2018 | Waterpark | | |
| 2018– | Shannon | | |
Senior career
| Years | Team | Apps | (Points) |
| 2020– | Munster | 83 | (85) |
- Correct as of 17 October 2026
International career
| Years | Team | Apps | (Points) |
| 2017 | Ireland U18 Clubs | 1 | (10) |
| 2019 | Ireland U19 | 2 | (0) |
| 2019–2020 | Ireland U20 | 8 | (15) |
| 2022 | Emerging Ireland | 3 | (0) |
| 2025 | Ireland | 2 | (0) |
- Correct as of 12 July 2025

Thomas Ahern (born 22 February 2000) is an Irish rugby union player who plays as a lock for United Rugby Championship club Munster.

== Early life ==
Born in Ardmore, County Waterford, Ahern's parents were from Cork GAA families and Ahern initially favoured those sports. However, when a cousin's friend dropped out of a summer rugby camp being held just across the border in Youghal, Ahern stepped in and ended up playing with Youghal RFC for five years, until moving to Dungarvan RFC aged 14, which was closer to Ahern's school. In his sixth year of school, Ahern moved to Waterpark RFC and into the second row, having previously played as a fullback. By this stage, he was on the Munster pathway, having linked up with the East Munster cadets and then progressing to the Munster under-17s squad and onto Munster under-18s and Ireland Schools.

Ahern attended St Augustine's College and represented Munster and Ireland at under-18 clubs level, winning an inter-provincial title with the former during the 2017–18 season. He has studied food science and health at the University of Limerick.

== Munster ==
Ahern joined the Munster academy ahead of the 2018–19 season. Due to a number of players being away for the 2019 Rugby World Cup with Ireland, Ahern and the other academy players spent their pre-season training for the 2019–20 season with the remaining senior players, with Ahern pointing in particular to the influence veteran lock Billy Holland had on his development. Ahern made his senior competitive debut for Munster in their 2020–21 Pro14 round 4 fixture against Welsh side Dragons on 1 November 2020, coming on as a 61st minute replacement for Jean Kleyn in Munster's 28–16 away win. He made his first start and scored his first try for Munster in their 52–3 win against Italian side Zebre on 30 November 2020. Ahern was Man-of-the-Match for Munster in their 31–17 win against Italian side Benetton in round 16 of the 2020–21 Pro14 on 19 March 2021.

Ahern joined the senior squad on a two-year contract from the 2021–22 season, and signed a two-year contract extension in October 2022. A shoulder injury sustained in the same month required surgery, ruling Ahern out until possibly March 2023.

== Ireland ==
Ahern earned one cap and scored two tries for Ireland under-18 clubs against Portugal under-18s in November 2017, and won two caps for Ireland under-19s in their capped friendlies against France under-19s in April 2019. One month later, Ahern was selected in the Ireland under-20s squad for the 2019 World Rugby Under 20 Championship, his first call up at that level internationally. He made his under-20s debut when he started in the third pool fixture against Italy on 12 June 2019. Ireland won 38–14, though Ahern left the field injured during the first half. He recovered in time to start in the 30–23 win against England on 17 June and the 40–17 defeat against New Zealand in the 7th-8th place play-off on 22 June.

Selected again in the under-20s squad for the 2020 Six Nations Under 20s Championship, Ahern started and scored a try in the 38–26 win against Scotland on 31 January, as well as starting in the 36–22 win against Wales on 7 February and scoring two tries in the 39–21 away win against England on 21 February, a victory that secured the triple crown for Ireland. Though the remainder of the tournament was cancelled due to the COVID-19 pandemic, Ahern earned widespread praise for his performances.

Though he wasn't called up to the senior Ireland squad, Ahern was selected to train with the squad as a development player during the 2021 Autumn internationals. Ahern was selected in the Emerging Ireland squad that travelled to South Africa to participate in the Toyota Challenge against Currie Cup teams Free State Cheetahs, Griquas and Pumas in September–October 2022. He started in Emerging Ireland's 54–7 opening win against Griquas on 30 September, featured as a replacement in the 28–24 win against the Pumas on 5 October, before starting again in the 21–14 win against the Cheetahs on 9 October.

Following the Toyota Challenge, Ahern was also selected in the Ireland A panel that joined the senior Ireland team after round 7 of the 2022–23 United Rugby Championship to face an All Blacks XV on 4 November 2022, however, a shoulder injury ruled Ahern out of the match.

In July 2025, he was named on the bench for the senior side against Georgia for the 2025 summer tour.

== Honours ==
=== Munster ===
- United Rugby Championship
  - Winner (1): 2022–23

=== Ireland under-20s ===
- Triple Crown:
  - Winner (1): 2020
