= 2024–25 Cardiff Rugby season =

Cardiff Rugby
- 2024–25 season
- Head coach: Matt Sherratt
- Chairman: Alun Jones
- United Rugby Championship: 9th
- Challenge Cup: Round of 16
- Average home attendance: 9,323

The 2024–25 season is Cardiff's fourth season in the United Rugby Championship. Along with competing in the URC and its Welsh Shield competition, the club also participate in the 2024-25 European Rugby Challenge Cup.

== Senior squad ==
Cardiff Rugby United Rugby Championship squad (Note: Taking into account signings and departures head of 2024–25 season as listed on List of 2024–25 United Rugby Championship transfers.)
**Props**: (Wales) **Keiron Assiratti**; (Wales) Rhys Barratt; (Ireland) **Ed Byrne**; (Wales) Will Davies-King; (Wales) **Corey Domachowski**; (Wales) Joe Cowell; (England) Rhys Litterick*; (England) Danny Southworth*; **Hookers**: (Wales) Liam Belcher (c); (Wales) Efan Daniel; (Wales) Dafydd Hughes; (Wales) **Evan Lloyd**; **Locks**: (Wales) **Seb Davies**; (England) Ben Donnell; (England) **Josh McNally**; (Wales) **Rory Thornton**; (Wales) **Teddy Williams**	**Back row**: (Wales) **James Botham**; (Wales) Gwilym Bradley; (Wales) Lucas de la Rua; (Wales) **Taulupe Faletau**; (Wales) Alun Lawrence; (Wales) **Alex Mann**; (Wales) **Mackenzie Martin**; (Wales) Dan Thomas; (Wales) **Thomas Young**; **Scrum-halves**: (Wales) **Ellis Bevan**; (Wales) **Aled Davies**; (South Africa) Johan Mulder; **Fly-halves**: (South Africa) Tinus de Beer; (Wales) **Callum Sheedy**; (Wales) Harri Wilde	**Centres**: (Wales) Steffan Emanuel; (Wales) **Mason Grady**; (England) Rory Jennings; (Samoa) **Rey Lee-Lo**; (Wales) Harri Millard; (Wales) **Ben Thomas**; **Wings**: (Wales) **Josh Adams**; (Wales) Tom Bowen; (Wales) Theo Cabango; (Wales) Regan Grace^{ST}; (England) Gabriel Hamer-Webb*; (England) Iwan Stephens*; **Fullbacks**: (Wales) **Jacob Beetham**; (Wales) **Cameron Winnett**
(c) denotes the team captain, **Bold** denotes internationally capped players.^{*} denotes players qualified to play for Wales on residency or dual nationality.^{ST} denotes a player on a short-term deal at the club, Players and their allocated positions from the Cardiff Rugby website.

=== Academy squad ===
Cardiff Rugby Academy squad (Note: Taking into account signings and departures ahead of the 2024–25 season as listed on List of 2024–25 United Rugby Championship transfers.)
**Props**: (Wales) Dylan Barratt; (Wales) Harrison Rock; (Wales) Cameron Tyler-Grocott; **Hookers**: (Wales) Tom Howe; **Locks**: (Wales) Lucca Alexander-White; (Wales) Sonny McCabe	**Back row**: (Wales) Alfie Prygodzicz; (Wales) Evan Rees; **Scrum-halves**: (Wales) Sion Davies; **Fly-halves**: (Wales) Ben Coomer	**Centres**: (Wales) Osian Darwin-Lewis; (Wales) Elijah Evans; (Wales) Ioan Leyshon; **Wings**: (Wales) Ollie Das; (Wales) Joseff Jones; (Wales) Kodie Stone; **Fullbacks**: (Wales) Matty Young
(c) denotes the team captain, **Bold** denotes internationally capped players.^{*} denotes players qualified to play for Wales on residency or dual nationality. Players and their allocated positions from the Cardiff Rugby website.

== United Rugby Championship ==
=== Main table ===
Pos	Team	Pld	W	D	L	PF	PA	PD	TF	TA	TB	LB	Pts	Qualification
1	Leinster (CH)	18	16	0	2	542	256	+286	79	35	11	1	76	Qualifies for home URC quarter-final; Qualification for the 2025–26 Champions Cup
2	Bulls (RU)	18	14	0	4	542	361	+181	71	44	9	3	68	Qualifies for home URC quarter-final; Qualification for the 2025–26 Champions Cup
3	Sharks	18	13	0	5	436	402	+34	55	59	7	3	62	Qualifies for home URC quarter-final; Qualification for the 2025–26 Champions Cup
4	Glasgow Warriors	18	11	0	7	468	327	+141	70	40	10	5	59	Qualifies for home URC quarter-final; Qualification for the 2025–26 Champions Cup
5	Stormers	18	10	0	8	507	418	+89	66	57	11	4	55	Qualifies for URC quarter-final; Qualification for the 2025–26 Champions Cup
6	Munster	18	9	0	9	444	429	+15	67	59	11	4	51	Qualifies for URC quarter-final; Qualification for the 2025–26 Champions Cup
7	Edinburgh	18	8	1	9	471	407	+64	66	57	9	6	49	Qualifies for URC quarter-final; Qualification for the 2025–26 Champions Cup
8	Scarlets	18	9	1	8	427	382	+45	50	52	6	4	48	Qualifies for URC quarter-final; Qualification for the 2025–26 Champions Cup
9	Cardiff	18	8	1	9	409	477	−68	63	65	10	3	47	Qualification for the 2025–26 Challenge Cup
10	Benetton	18	9	1	8	393	478	−85	50	65	7	1	46	Qualification for the 2025–26 Challenge Cup
11	Lions	18	8	0	10	402	440	−38	53	60	5	3	40	Qualification for the 2025–26 Challenge Cup
12	Ospreys	18	7	1	10	437	454	−17	60	63	6	4	40	Qualification for the 2025–26 Challenge Cup
13	Connacht	18	6	0	12	420	472	−52	64	62	9	6	39	Qualification for the 2025–26 Challenge Cup
14	Ulster	18	7	0	11	414	506	−92	59	72	5	5	38	Qualification for the 2025–26 Challenge Cup
15	Zebre Parma	18	5	1	12	302	503	−201	38	72	3	4	29	Qualification for the 2025–26 Challenge Cup
16	Dragons	18	1	0	17	335	637	−302	43	92	1	4	9	Qualification for the 2025–26 Challenge Cup

Source: UnitedRugby.com
Rules for classification: Tiebreakers for teams tied on points: 1) Number of matches won 2) The difference between points for and points against 3) The number of tries scored 4) The most points scored 5) The difference between tries for and tries against 6) The fewest red cards received 7) The fewest yellow cards received.

=== Round 1 ===
20 September 2024
19:35

(1 BP) Cardiff (Wales)	22–17	(Italy) Zebre Parma (1 BP)
Try: Winnett 9' c Stephens 18' m D. Thomas 23' m McNally 56' m Con: Sheedy 10' (1/4)		Try: Bertaccini 64' c Locatelli 81' c Con: Da Re (2/2) 65', 82'; Pen: Montemauri 8'

Cardiff Arms Park, Cardiff
Attendance: 6,291
Referee: Eoghan Cross (Ireland)

=== Round 2 ===
28 September 2024
17:15

Scarlets (Wales)	15–24	(Wales) Cardiff (1 BP)
Try: Page 1' c Plumtree 10' m Con: Costelow (1/2) 1'; Pen: Costelow (1) 4'		Try: Belcher 17' m Grady 21' c Millard 56'; B. Thomas 62'; Con: Sheedy (2/4) 21', 63'

Parc y Scarlets, Llanelli
Attendance: 7,355
Referee: Christopher Allison (South Africa)

=== Round 3 ===
4 October 2024
19:35

(1 BP) Cardiff (Wales)	36–52	(Scotland) Glasgow Warriors (1 BP)
Try: D. Thomas 11' c Winnett 19' m Byrne 46' c Martin 52' c Donnell 67' c Con: Sheedy (1/2) 12' de Beer (3/3) 47', 54' 69'; Pen: de Beer (1/1) 59'		Try: Dobie 5' c Rowe (2) 21' m, 74' m Jordan (2) 29' c, 74' m Tuipulotu 34' c Jones 37' c M. Fagerson 74' m Con: Jordan (5/6) 6', 30', 35', 39', 64'; Weir (1/2) 72'

Cardiff Arms Park, Cardiff
Attendance: 6,237
Referee: Morné Ferreira (South Africa)

=== Round 4 ===
12 October 2024
15:00

(1 BP) Cardiff (Wales)	19–25	(Wales) Scarlets
Try: Millard 22' c, 43' m Penalty try 66'; Con: de Beer 23' (1/1)		Try: G. Davies (2) 32' m, 46' c J. Williams 59' c Con: Lloyd (2/3) 47', 60'; Pen: Lloyd (2) 8', 16'

Cardiff Arms Park, Cardiff
Attendance: 12,125
Referee: Craig Evans (Wales)

=== Round 5 ===
19 October 2024
17:15

(1 BP) Edinburgh (Scotland)	27–8	(Wales) Cardiff
Try: van der Merwe 45' c Schoeman 61' m Graham 64' m Ashman 78' c Con: Thompson (2/4) 46', 79'; Pen: Thompson 6'		Try: Young 28' m Pen: Sheedy 57'

Hive Stadium, Edinburgh
Attendance: 6,507
Referee: Morné Ferreira, South Africa

=== Round 6 ===
26 October 2024
19:35

Cardiff (Wales)	21–19	(Ireland) Ulster (1 BP)
Try: Stephens 48' c Hughes 64' c Young 67' c Con: Sheedy (3/3) 49', 65', 68'		Try: Izuchukwu 13' c Postlethwaite (2) 17' c, 23' m Con: Doak (2/3) 14', 18'

Cardiff Arms Park, Cardiff
Attendance: 8,312
Referee: Sam Grove-White, Scotland

=== Round 7 ===
30 November 2024
17:15

(1 BP) Cardiff (Wales)	31–23	(Wales) Dragons
Try: Mann 31' c Millard 42' c Sheedy 42' c Lee-Lo 49' c Con: Sheedy (4/4) 32', 43', 43', 50'; Pen: Sheedy 7'		Try: Lloyd 64' c Seiuli 71' c Con: O'Brien (2/2) 65', 72'; Pen: O'Brien (3) 11', 23', 28'

Cardiff Arms Park, Cardiff
Attendance: 9,638
Referee: Ben Whitehouse (Wales)

=== Round 8 ===
26 December 2024
15:00

(1 BP) Dragons (Wales)	22-24	(Wales) Cardiff (1 BP)
Try: Wainwright 14' c Dyer 19' m R. Williams 68' c Con: O'Brien (2/3) 15', 69'; Pen: O'Brien 17'	Report	Try: Williams 32' m Adams 44' c Hamer-Webb 56' c Lloyd 75' m Con: Sheedy (2/4) 45', 57'

Rodney Parade, Newport
Attendance: 8,511
Referee: Adam Jones

=== Round 9 ===
1 January 2025
15:00

Cardiff (Wales)	13–13	(Wales) Ospreys
Try: Botham 6'; Hughes 53'; Pen: Thomas 70'	Report	Try: Edwards 49'; Con: Edwards 50'; Pen: Edwards (2) 31', 68'

Cardiff Arms Park, Cardiff
Attendance: 12,125

=== Round 10 ===
25 January 2025
17:15

Cardiff (Wales)	22–42	(South Africa) Sharks
Try: Mann 6' m Bowen (2) 36' m, 43' c Hamer-Webb 57' m Con: Sheedy (1/4) 44'		Try: Mbonambi (2) 14' c, 41' c Julius 17' c Mapimpi 31' c F. Venter 72' c Penxe 75' c Con: Jo. Hendrikse (6/6) 14', 18', 32', 41', 73', 76'

Cardiff Arms Park, Cardiff
Attendance: 11,687

=== Round 11 ===
15 February 2025	(1 BP) Connacht (Ireland)	24–19	(Wales) Cardiff (1BP)	The Sportsground, Galway
19:35	Try: Murphy, 7'c Hurley-Langton, 17'c Heffernan, 47'; Tierney-Martin, 75; Con: Ioane (2)	Report	Try: Lee-Lo, 52'c Donnell, 63'; Braley, 69'c Con: Sheedy (2)	Attendance: 3,648

=== Round 12 ===
1 March 2025	(1 BP) Leinster (Ireland)	42–24	(Wales) Cardiff (1BP)	Aviva Stadium, Dublin
15:00	Try: McKee 14' c Boyle 40' c Deegan 42' c McGrath 50' c Tector 53' c Russell 75' c Con: R. Byrne (6/6) 15', 41', 42', 51', 54', 77'	Report	Try: Millard 16' m Young 29' c Millard 57' m Bevan 69' c Con: Sheedy (1/3) 30' de Beer (1/1) 70'	Attendance: 17,951; Referee: Andrea Piardi

=== Round 13 ===
21 March 2025	Cardiff (Wales)	20 – 17	(South Africa) Lions (1 BP)	Cardiff Arms Park, Cardiff
19:35	Try: Donnell, 20'c Millard, 63'c Con: Sheedy (2); Pen: Sheedy, 31', 50'	Report	Try: Ntlabakanye, 11'c Horn, 57'c Con: Lombard (2); Pen: Lombard, 44'	Attendance: 6,235; Referee: (Italy) Federico Vedovelli

=== Round 14 ===
29 March 2025	Benetton (Italy)	20 - 19	(Wales) Cardiff (1 BP)	Stadio Monigo, Treviso
20:35	Try: Albornoz, 20'; Con: Albornoz, 21'; Pen: Albornoz, 9', 77'	Report:ESPN	Try: Botham, 6'; Bevan, 16'; Lloyd, 68'; Con: Sheedy, 7', 17'	Attendance: 4,715

==== Administration and sale ====
In the fallow week following elimination from the 2024–25 EPCR Challenge Cup, Cardiff Rugby were placed in administration for 24 hours following the failure of private funding. The club were bought out of administration the following day by the Welsh Rugby Union, who took over ownership of the professional club. The club and its staff remained in place.

=== Round 15 ===
19 April 2025	Ospreys (Wales)	19 - 36	(Wales) Cardiff (1BP)	Principality Stadium, Cardiff
15:00	Try: Williams, 11'; Spencer, 60'; Hardy, 76'; Con: Edwards, 11', 77'		Try: Mann, 15', 35'; Hamer-Webb, 20', 29', 80' penalty try, 79'; Con: Sheedy, 16'; Thomas, 81'	Attendance: 28,328; Referee: Ben Connor

=== Round 16 ===
25 April 2025	(1 BP) Cardiff (Wales)	26 - 21	(Ireland) Munster (1 BP)	Cardiff Arms Park
19:35	Try: Hamer-Webb, 26'; Millard, 28' penalty try, 54'; Mulder, 63'; Con: Sheedy, 28', 64'	Report, 2	Try: Nash, 12'; Haley, 37'; Farrell, 50'; Con: Crowley, 13', 38', 51'	Attendance: 11,253; Referee: Gianluca Gnecchi

=== Round 17 ===
10 May 2025	(1 BP) Bulls (South Africa)	45–21	(Wales) Cardiff	Loftus Versfeld Stadium, Pretoria
16:45	Try: Vorster, 7'; Louw, 16'; Moodie, 21'; Hanekom, 38' de Klerk, 42', 52'; Con: Goosen, 8'; Johannes, 17', 22', 39', 43', 53'; Pen: Goosen, 3'		Try: Mann, 47'; T Williams, 72'; Hamer-Webb, 76'; Con: B Thomas, 48', 73', 77'

=== Round 18 ===
16 May 2025	(1 BP) Stormers (South Africa)	34–24	(Wales) Cardiff (1 BP)	Cape Town Stadium
19:00	Try: Zas, 10', 33'; Hartzenberg, 25', 47'; Evans, 72'; Con: Willemse, 25', 34'; Feinberg-Mngomezulu, 73'; Pen: Feinberg-Mngomezulu, 80'; Cards: Willemse, (red card) 59'	Report	Try: Southworth, 14'; Hamer-Webb, 37'; Millard, 57'; Hughes, 77'; Con: Sheedy, 15', 78'; Cards: Southworth, (red card) 29'	Attendance: 19,256

Cardiff are eliminated from the Championship.

== URC Welsh Shield ==
Cardiff win their first URC Welsh Shield.

2024–25 United Rugby Championship Regional Shield Pools
(Wales) Welsh Shield
	Team	P	W	D	L	PF	PA	PD	TF	TA	TBP	LBP	Pts	Pos overall
1	(Wales) Cardiff (S)	6	4	1	1	147	117	+30	23	14	4	1	23	9
2	(Wales) Scarlets	6	4	0	2	163	126	+37	20	18	3	1	20	7
3	(Wales) Ospreys	6	2	1	3	155	156	–1	21	20	1	1	12	12
4	(Wales) Dragons	6	1	0	5	130	196	–66	15	27	0	1	5	16
If teams are level at any stage, tiebreakers are applied in the following order: 1. number of matches won 2. the difference between points for and points against 3. the number of tries scored 4. the most points scored 5. the difference between tries for and tries against 6. the fewest red cards received 7. the fewest yellow cards received
Green background indicates teams currently leading the regional shield. Upon the conclusion of the regular season, these teams win their respective regional shields. (S) : URC Shield champion

== European Challenge Cup ==
EPCR Challenge Cup Pool 1
Pos	Team	Pld	W	D	L	PF	PA	PD	TF	TA	TB	LB	Pts	Qualification
1	(Ireland) Connacht (1)	4	4	0	0	154	73	+81	25	10	4	0	20	Home round of 16
2	(France) Lyon (5)	4	3	0	1	150	118	+32	21	19	2	0	14	Home round of 16
3	(France) Perpignan (8)	4	2	1	1	100	92	+8	12	14	1	0	11	Home round of 16
4	(Wales) Cardiff (16)	4	1	0	3	91	98	−7	13	13	2	1	7	Away round of 16
5	(South Africa) Cheetahs	4	1	1	2	73	132	−59	10	19	0	0	6	
6	(Italy) Zebre Parma	4	0	0	4	70	125	−55	10	17	0	2	2	

Source: EPCR
Rules for classification: Tiebreakers for teams tied on points: 1) Number of matches won; 2) Difference between points for and against; 3) Total number of points for; 4) Aggregate number of points scored in matches between tied teams; 5) Number of matches won excluding the first match, then the second and so on until the tie is settled.

=== Pool matches ===
==== Round 1 ====
7 December 2024
16:15

(1 BP) Lyon (France)	37–26	(Wales) Cardiff (1 BP)
Try: Dumortier (2) 6' m, 37' m Parisien 24' c Charcosset 47' c González 62' c Con: Meliande (3/4) 25', 48', 63'; Pen: Meliande (1/1) 69'; González (1/1) 74'	Report	Try: Adams 3' c Southworth 15' c Bevan 53' c Hamer-Webb 61' m Con: Sheedy (3/4) 4', 16', 54'

Stade de Gerland, Lyon
Attendance: 14,073
Referee: Hollie Davidson (Scotland)

==== Round 2 ====
14 December 2024
20:00

(1 BP) Cardiff (Wales)	26–10	(South Africa) Cheetahs
Try: Adams (2) 17' m, 56' c Bowen 46' c Penalty try 67'; Con: Sheedy (2/3) 47', 57'	Report	Try: de Haas 31' c Con: Wentzel (1/1) 33'; Pen: Wentzel (1/1) 36'

Cardiff Arms Park, Cardiff
Attendance: 5,410
Referee: Eoghan Cross (Ireland)

==== Round 3 ====
11 January 2025
14:00

Perpignan (France)	23–20	(Wales) Cardiff (1 BP)
Try: Allan 39' c Veredamu 49' m Velarte 61' m Con: Allan (1/2) 40+1'; Pen: Allan (2/2) 3', 48'	Report	Try: Lee-Lo 42' c Mulder 69' c Con: de Beer (2/2) 43', 69'; Pen: de Beer (2/2) 35', 53'

Stade Aimé Giral, Perpignan
Attendance: 8,016
Referee: Gianluca Gnecchi (Italy)

==== Round 4 ====
17 January 2025
20:00

Cardiff (Wales)	19–28	(Ireland) Connacht (1 BP)
Try: Lloyd 17' c Young (2) 42' c, 58' m Con: Ben Thomas (2/3) 18', 43'	Report	Try: J. Murphy 13' c Joyce 36' c Ralston 53' c Devine 65' c Con: Ioane (3/3) 13', 37', 54'; Hanranhan (1/1) 66'

Cardiff Arms Park, Cardiff
Attendance: 6,321
Referee: Morné Ferreira (South Africa)

=== Knockout stage ===
Round of 16
3	(Scotland) Edinburgh	24
14	(South Africa) Lions	12
6	(France) Bayonne	22
11	(South Africa) Bulls	32
7	(France) Pau	24
10	(England) Bath Rugby	49
2	(France) Montpellier	17
15	(England) Gloucester	24
4	(Wales) Ospreys	36
13	(Wales) Scarlets	14
5	(France) Lyon	34
12	(South Africa) Sharks	21
1	(Ireland) Connacht	35
16	(Wales) Cardiff	20
8	(France) Perpignan	18
9	(France) Racing 92	24

Quarter-finals
3	(Scotland) Edinburgh	34
11	(South Africa) Bulls	28
10	(England) Bath Rugby	61
15	(England) Gloucester	26
4	(Wales) Ospreys	18
5	(France) Lyon	20
1	(Ireland) Connacht	40
9	(France) Racing 92	43

Semi-finals
3	(Scotland) Edinburgh	24
10	(England) Bath Rugby	39
5	(France) Lyon	29
9	(France) Racing 92	15

Final
10	(England) Bath Rugby	37
5	(France) Lyon	12

==== Round of 16 ====
Cardiff qualified as the 16th and final seed from the pool stages and will meet top seed Connacht Rugby in the round of 16.

5 April 2025
20:00

Connacht (Ireland) (1)	35–20	(16) (Wales) Cardiff
Try: Divine 2' c Jansen 40+4' c Treacy 44' c Bolton 66' c Boyle 76' c Con: Hanrahan (3/3) 4', 45', 42'; Ioane (2/2) 66', 77'	Report	Try: Lee-Lo 37' m Thomas 53' c Adams 60' m Con: Thomas; Pen: Sheedy (1/2) 12'

The Sportsground, Galway
Attendance: 4,217
Referee: Luc Ramos (France)
