= 2022 Six Nations Under 20s Championship =

Under 20 Rugby union competition

- Date: 4 February 2022 – 20 March 2022
- Countries: England; France; Ireland; Italy; Scotland; Wales

Tournament statistics
- Champions: Ireland
- Grand Slam: Ireland
- Triple Crown: Ireland
- Matches played: 6
- Attendance: 29,915 (4,986 per match)
- Tries scored: 33 (5.5 per match)

The 2022 Six Nations Under 20s Championship is the 15th Six Nations Under 20s Championship, the annual northern hemisphere rugby union championship contested by the under-20 national teams of England, France, Ireland, Italy, Scotland and Wales. England were the defending champions, having completed a Grand Slam in the previous tournament. Ireland won the tournament for the fourth time and due to winning all five of their matches, a third Grand Slam.

== Participants ==
Nation	Stadium			Head coach	Captain
Nation	Home stadium	Capacity	Location	Head coach	Captain
England	Castle Park; Barnet Copthall	5,000; 10,500	Doncaster; London	Alan Dickens	Fin Baxter
France	Stade Guy Boniface; Stade Aimé Giral	16,800; 14,593	Mont-de-Marsan; Perpignan		
Ireland	Musgrave Park	8,008	Cork	Richie Murphy	Reuben Crothers
Italy	Stadio Comunale di Monigo	5,000	Treviso	Massimo Brunello	Giacomo Ferrari
Scotland	Edinburgh Rugby Stadium	7,800	Edinburgh		Rhys Tait
Wales	Eirias Stadium	6,080	Colwyn Bay	Byron Haywood	

== Table ==
Position	Nation	Games				Points			Tries		Bonus points			Total points
Position	Nation	Played	Won	Drawn	Lost	For	Against	Diff	For	Against	Tries	Loss	GS	Total points
1	Ireland	5	5	0	0	210	65	145	29	9	4	0	3	27
2	France	5	4	0	1	160	86	74	17	11	3	1	-	20
3	England	5	2	0	3	133	112	21	19	13	3	2	-	13
4	Italy	5	3	0	2	87	113	−26	11	12	1	0	-	13
5	Wales	5	1	0	4	80	183	−103	11	25	1	1	-	6
6	Scotland	5	0	0	5	72	183	−111	9	26	1	0	-	1
Source: Updated: 20 March 2022

Table ranking rules

- Four match points are awarded for a win.
- Two match points are awarded for a draw.
- A bonus match point is awarded to a team that scores four or more tries in a match or loses a match by seven points or fewer. If a team scores four tries in a match and loses by seven points or fewer, they are awarded both bonus points.
- Three bonus match points are awarded to a team that wins all five of their matches (known as a Grand Slam). This ensures that a Grand Slam winning team reaches a minimum of 23 points, and thus always ranks over a team who won four matches in which they also were awarded four try bonus points and were also awarded two bonus points (a try bonus and a losing bonus) in the match that they lost for a total of 22 points.
- Tie-breakers
  - If two or more teams are tied on match points, the team with the better points difference (points scored less points conceded) is ranked higher.
  - If the above tie-breaker fails to separate tied teams, the team that scored the higher number of total tries in their matches is ranked higher.
  - If two or more teams remain tied for first place at the end of the championship after applying the above tiebreakers, the title is shared between them.

== Fixtures ==
=== Week 1 ===
4 February 2022
20:00

(1 BP) France	41–15	Italy
Try: Reybier 14' c Dayral 24' c Bevia 29' m Auriac 72' c Con: Auriac (3) 15', 26', 73'; Pen: Auriac (5) 21', 48', 53', 60', 78'	Report	Try: Ortombina 41' c Pani 43' m Con: Teneggi 42'; Pen: Teneggi 41'

Stade Guy Boniface
Referee: Eoghan Cross (Ireland)

4 February 2022
20:00

(1 BP) Scotland	24–41	England (1 BP)
Try: Leatherbarrow (2) 12' m, 30' c Melville 44' m Hiddleston 80+2' c Con: Townsend (2) 32', 80+4'	Report	Try: Arundell 22' m Knight (2) 37' m, 63' c Carr-Smith 54' c Grayson 65' c Litchfield 75' c Con: Benson (4) 55', 64', 66', 76'; Pen: Benson 51'

Edinburgh Rugby Stadium, Edinburgh
Referee: Benoît Rousselet (France)

4 February 2022
20:00

(1 BP) Ireland	53–5	Wales
Try: Mullins (2) 13' m, 51' c Devine 22' c Morrissey 34' c Crothers 41' c McNabney 44' m McCormick 60' m Brownlee 79' c Con: Tector (4) 23', 35', 42', 52'; Butler 80'; Pen: Tector 3'	Report	Try: Andrew 74' m

Musgrave Park, Cork
Attendance: 7,289
Referee: Sara Cox (England)

FB	15	Patrick Campbell	(substituted off) 35'
RW	14	Chay Mullins	(substituted off) 64'
OC	13	Fionn Gibbons
IC	12	Ben Brownlee
LW	11	Shane Mallon
FH	10	Charlie Tector	(substituted off) 52' (substituted on) 64' (substituted off) 72'
SH	9	Matthew Devine	(substituted off) 52' (substituted on) 72'
N8	8	James Culhane
OF	7	Reuben Crothers (c)
BF	6	James McNabney	(substituted off) 61'
RL	5	Mark Morrissey	(substituted off) 59'
LL	4	Conor O'Tighearnaigh
TP	3	Scott Wilson	(substituted off) 59'
HK	2	James McCormick	(substituted off) 61'
LP	1	Jack Boyle	(substituted off) 49'
Replacements:
HK	16	Josh Hanlon	(substituted on) 61'
PR	17	Oisin Michel	(substituted on) 49'
PR	18	Rory McGuire	(substituted on) 59'
LK	19	Adam McNamee	(substituted on) 59'
FL	20	Ronan O'Sullivan	(substituted on) 61'
SH	21	Ethan Coughlan	(substituted on) 52'
FH	22	Tony Butler	(substituted on) 52'
WG	23	Aitzol King	(substituted on) 35'
Coach:
Richie Murphy

FB	15	Cameron Winnett		(substituted off) 66'
RW	14	Harri Houston		(substituted off) 60'
OC	13	Bryn Bradley		(substituted off) 46'
IC	12	Eddie James
LW	11	Oli Andrew	(yellow card) 21'
FH	10	Dan Edwards
SH	9	Harri Williams		(substituted off) 60'
N8	8	Ben Moa		(substituted off) 49'
OF	7	Ethan Fackrell
BF	6	Alex Mann		(substituted off) 22' (substituted on) 31'
RL	5	Lewis Jones		(substituted off) 55'
LL	4	Joe Peard	(yellow card) 50'
TP	3	Nathan Evans
HK	2	Efan Daniel		(substituted off) 31'
LP	1	Joe Cowell		(substituted off) 46'
Replacements:
HK	16	Morgan Veness		(substituted on) 31'
PR	17	Rhys Barratt		(substituted on) 46'
PR	18	Ellis Fackrell		(substituted on) 66'
LK	19	Benji Williams		(substituted on) 55'
BR	20	Tom Cowan		(substituted on) 22' (substituted off) 31' (substituted on) 49'
SH	21	Morgan Lloyd		(substituted on) 60'
WG	22	Jac Lloyd		(substituted on) 60'
OC	23	Joe Hawkins		(substituted on) 46'
Coach:
Byron Hayward

=== Week 2 ===
11 February 2022
19:00

Italy	6–0	England (1 BP)
Pen: Teneggi (2) 6', 44'	Report

Stadio Comunale di Monigo, Treviso
Attendance: 2,845
Referee: Aurélie Groizeleau (France)

11 February 2022
20:00

(1 BP) Wales	26–13	Scotland
Try: Mann 49' c Hawkins 67' c Houston 73' m Morse 79' c Con: J. Lloyd 50'; Edwards (2) 68', 80'	Report	Try: Deehan 14' c Con: Townsend 15'; Pen: McClintock (2) 45', 64'

Eirias Stadium, Colwyn Bay
Attendance: 2,583
Referee: Julianne Zussman (Canada)

11 February 2022
20:00

(1 BP) France	16–17	Ireland
Try: Montgaillard 26' c Con: Auriac 28'; Pen: Auriac (3) 4', 44', 57'	Report	Try: McCormick 32' c Brownlee 79' c Con: Tector (2) 33', 80'; Pen: Tector 54'

Stade Maurice David
Attendance: 5,043
Referee: Hollie Davidson (Scotland)

FB	15	Max Auriac
RW	14	Jefferson Joseph
OC	13	Émilien Gailleton
IC	12	Louis Le Brun
LW	11	Enzo Reybier
FH	10	Louis Foursans-Bourdette
SH	9	Baptiste Jauneau
N8	8	Malohi Suta
OF	7	Noe Della Schiava
BF	6	Leo Banos
RL	5	Matthieu Uhila
LL	4	Samuel M'Foudi
TP	3	Valentin Simutoga
HK	2	Victor Montgaillard
LP	1	Matis Perchaud
Replacements:
HK	16	Lucas Martin
PR	17	Louis Penverne
PR	18	Thomas Crețu
LK	19	Raphael Portat
BR	20	Joseph Exshaw
BR	21	Jules Coulon
WG	22	Aubin Eymeri
WG	23	Ethan Randle
Coach:
Jean-Marc Béderède

FB	15	Patrick Campbell
RW	14	Aitzol King
OC	13	Ben Brownlee
IC	12	Daniel Hawkshaw
LW	11	Shane Mallon	(substituted off) 69'
FH	10	Charlie Tector
SH	9	Ethan Coughlan	(substituted off) 45'
N8	8	James Culhane
OF	7	Reuben Crothers (c)
BF	6	James McNabney	(substituted off) 67'
RL	5	Mark Morrissey	(substituted off) 69'
LL	4	Conor O'Tighearnaigh
TP	3	Rory McGuire	(substituted off) 64'
HK	2	James McCormick
LP	1	Jack Boyle
Replacements:
HK	16	Josh Hanlon
PR	17	Oisin Michel
PR	18	Darragh McSweeney	(substituted on) 64'
LK	19	Adam McNamee	(substituted on) 69'
FL	20	Conor Moloney	(substituted on) 67'
SH	21	Matthew Devine	(substituted on) 45'
FH	22	Tony Butler
WG	23	Dylan O'Grady	(substituted on) 69'
Coach:
Richie Murphy

=== Week 3 ===
25 February 2022
20:00

(1 BP) England	43–14	Wales
Try: Arundell (2) 26' m, 68' c Theobald-Thomas 34' c Ilione 41' c Hobson 51' c Bailey 64' c Con: Benson (3) 35', 42', 53'; Johnson 66', 69'; Pen: Benson 21'	Report	Try: Barratt 2' c B. Williams 48' c Con: J. Lloyd (2) 3', 49'

Castle Park, Doncaster
Referee: Joy Neville (Ireland)

25 February 2022
20:00

Scotland	17–30	France (1 BP)
Try: Norrie 59' c Taylor 78' c Con: McClintock (2) 60', 79'; Pen: McClintock 4'	Report	Try: Capilla 16' m Le Brun 32' c Gailleton 44' m Sa 66' c Con: Dayral 33'; Le Brun 67'; Pen: Dayral (2) 9', 26'

Edinburgh Rugby Stadium, Edinburgh
Referee: Clara Munarini (Italy)

25 February 2022
20:00

(1 BP) Ireland	39–12	Italy
Try: Gibbons 16' c Devine 56' c McLoughlin 60' m Crothers 69' c Mullins 74' c Con: Tector (2) 18', 57'; Butler (2) 70', 75'; Pen: Tector (2) 24', 28'	Report	Try: Rizzoli 42' c Scramoncin 78' m Con: Teneggi 43'

Musgrave Park, Cork
Referee: Aled Evans (Wales)

FB	15	Patrick Campbell
RW	14	Chay Mullins
OC	13	Jude Postlethwaite
IC	12	Ben Brownlee		(substituted off) 40'
LW	11	Fionn Gibbons
FH	10	Charlie Tector		(substituted off) 68'
SH	9	Matthew Devine		(substituted off) 67'
N8	8	James Culhane
OF	7	Reuben Crothers (c)
BF	6	James McNabney		(substituted off) 51'
RL	5	Mark Morrissey
LL	4	Conor O'Tighearnaigh		(substituted off) 70'
TP	3	Rory McGuire		(substituted off) 59'
HK	2	James McCormick		(substituted off) 67'
LP	1	Jack Boyle		(substituted off) 68'
Replacements:
HK	16	Josh Hanlon		(substituted on) 67'
PR	17	Oisin Michel		(substituted on) 68'
PR	18	Darragh McSweeney		(substituted on) 59'
LK	19	Adam McNamee		(substituted on) 70'
FL	20	Lorcan McLoughlin	(yellow card) 78'	(substituted on) 51'
SH	21	Ethan Coughlan		(substituted on) 67'
FH	22	Tony Butler		(substituted on) 68'
WG	23	Dylan O'Grady		(substituted on) 40'
Coach:
Richie Murphy

FB	15	Lorenzo Pani
RW	14	Federico Cuminetti
OC	13	François Carlo Mey		(substituted off) 62'
IC	12	Dewi Passarella
LW	11	Filippo Lazzarin
FH	10	Nicolò Teneggi		(substituted off) 62'
SH	9	Alessandro Garbisi		(substituted off) 70'
N8	8	Giacomo Ferrari	(yellow card) 40'	(substituted off) 59' (substituted on) 67'
OF	7	Ross Vintcent		(substituted off) 36' (substituted on) 40' (substituted off) 45'
BF	6	David Odiase	(yellow card) 24'	(substituted off) 69'
RL	5	Riccardo Andreoli
LL	4	Alessandro Ortombini
TP	3	Riccardo Genovese		(substituted off) 68'
HK	2	Lapo Frangini	(yellow card) 57'	(substituted off) 67'
LP	1	Luca Rizzoli		(substituted off) 76'
Replacements:
HK	16	Tommaso Scramoncin		(substituted on) 59'
PR	17	Valerio Bizzotti		(substituted on) 68'
PR	18	Ricardo Bartolini		(substituted on) 76'
LK	19	Carlos Berlese		(substituted on) 69'
BR	20	Giovanni Cenedese		(substituted on) 36' (substituted off) 40' (substituted on) 45'
BR	21	Gianluca Tomaselli		(substituted on) 70'
WG	22	Giovanni Sante		(substituted on) 62'
WG	23	Arturo Fusari		(substituted on) 62'
Coach:
Massimo Brunello

=== Week 4 ===
10 March 2022
20:00

Wales	15–47	France (1 BP)
Try: Penalty try 31'; Williams 35' m Pen: J. Lloyd 5'	Report	Try: Fonnicola 6' c Sa (2) 16' c, 46' c Reybier 72' c Tarel 77' m Auriac 79' m Con: Barre (4) 7', 17', 47', 72'; Pen: Barre (3) 12', 40', 43'

Eirias Stadium, Colwyn Bay
Referee: Shota Tevzadze (Georgia)

11 March 2022
19:00

Italy	27–13	Scotland
Try: Ferrari (2) 3' c, 52' c Mey 32' c Con: Sante (3) 4', 33', 53'; Pen: Sante (2) 19', 49'	Report	Try: Taylor 80' c Con: Townsend 80+1'; Pen: McClintock (2) 8', 16'

Stadio Comunale Di Monigo
Referee: Aimee Barrett-Theron (South Africa)

12 March 2022
19:15

(1 BP) England	27–42	Ireland (1 BP)
Try: Hendy 4' c Ilione 30' c Cleaves 57' m Bailey 74' m Con: Benson (2) 6', 31'; Pen: Benson 10'	Report	Try: Devine 17' c McLoughlin 22' c McGuire 43' c King (2) 61' c, 66' m Con: Tector (4) 18', 23', 44', 62'; Pen: Tector (3) 13', 53', 71'

Barnet Copthall, London
Referee: Damián Schneider (Argentina)

FB	15	George Hendy
RW	14	Deago Bailey
OC	13	Jacob Cusick	(substituted off) 47'
IC	12	Ethan Grayson
LW	11	Cassius Cleaves
FH	10	Jamie Benson	(substituted off) 47'
SH	9	Sam Edwards
N8	8	Emeka Ilione
OF	7	Toby McKnight	(substituted off) 55'
BF	6	Ewan Richards	(substituted off) 69'
RL	5	Tom Lockett	(substituted off) 47'
LL	4	Lewis Chessum
TP	3	Tim Hoyt	(substituted off) 64'
HK	2	John Stewart	(substituted off) 80'
LP	1	Fin Baxter	(substituted off) 71'
Replacements:
HK	16	Finn Theobald-Thomas	(substituted on) 80'
PR	17	Mark Dormer	(substituted on) 71'
PR	18	Mike Summerfield	(substituted on) 64'
LK	19	Chandler Cunningham-South	(substituted on) 47'
BR	20	Lucas Brooke	(substituted on) 55'
BR	21	Nye Thomas	(substituted on) 69'
WG	22	Louie Johnson	(substituted on) 47'
WG	23	Will Joseph	(substituted on) 47'
Coach:
Alan Dickens

FB	15	Patrick Campbell
RW	14	Chay Mullins	(substituted off) 60'
OC	13	Jude Postlethwaite
IC	12	Ben Carson
LW	11	Fionn Gibbons
FH	10	Charlie Tector	(substituted off) 71'
SH	9	Matthew Devine	(substituted off) 58'
N8	8	James Culhane
OF	7	Reuben Crothers (c)
BF	6	Lorcan McLoughlin	(substituted off) 71'
RL	5	Mark Morrissey	(substituted off) 72'
LL	4	Conor O'Tighearnaigh
TP	3	Rory McGuire	(substituted off) 69'
HK	2	James McCormick	(substituted off) 69'
LP	1	Jack Boyle	(substituted off) 75'
Replacements:
HK	16	Josh Hanlon	(substituted on) 69'
PR	17	Oisin Michel	(substituted on) 75'
PR	18	Scott Wilson	(substituted on) 69'
LK	19	James McNabney	(substituted on) 72'
FL	20	Diarmuid Mangan	(substituted on) 71'
SH	21	Ethan Coughlan	(substituted on) 58'
FH	22	Tony Butler	(substituted on) 71'
WG	23	Aitzol King	(substituted on) 60'
Coach:
Richie Murphy

=== Week 5 ===
20 March 2022
14:00

(1 BP) Wales	20–27	Italy (1 BP)
Try: Davies 63' c Mann 74' c Con: Phillips (2) 64', 75'; Pen: Hawkins (2) 5', 32'	Report	Try: Mey 2' c Garbisi (2) 33', 48'; Frangini 60' c Con: Sante 3'; Teneggi 62'; Pen: Sante 40'

Eirias Stadium, Colwyn Bay
Referee: Damián Schneider (Argentina)

20 March 2022
17:00

(1 BP) Ireland	59–5	Scotland
Try: Boyle 5' c Gibbons (2) 11' m, 78' c Postlethwaite 23' c Culhane 32' c Carson 39' c Devine 52' m McCormick 57' c Hanlon 74' c Con: Tector (4) 6', 24', 34', 40'; Butler (3) 58', 75', 79'	Report	Try: McKnight 70' m

Musgrave Park, Cork
Attendance: 8,008
Referee: Federico Vedovelli (Italy)

FB	15	Patrick Campbell		(substituted off) 36'
RW	14	Aitzol King
OC	13	Jude Postlethwaite	(yellow card) 70'
IC	12	Ben Carson
LW	11	Fionn Gibbons
FH	10	Charlie Tector		(substituted off) 55'
SH	9	Matthew Devine		(substituted off) 55'
N8	8	James Culhane		(substituted off) 61'
OF	7	Reuben Crothers (c)
BF	6	Lorcan McLoughlin
RL	5	Mark Morrissey		(substituted off) 61'
LL	4	Conor O'Tighearnaigh
TP	3	Rory McGuire		(substituted off) 55'
HK	2	James McCormick		(substituted off) 59'
LP	1	Jack Boyle		(substituted off) 57'
Replacements:
HK	16	Josh Hanlon		(substituted on) 59'
PR	17	Oisin Michel		(substituted on) 57'
PR	18	Scott Wilson		(substituted on) 55'
LK	19	Adam McNamee		(substituted on) 61'
FL	20	Diarmuid Mangan		(substituted on) 61'
SH	21	Ethan Coughlan		(substituted on) 55'
FH	22	Tony Butler		(substituted on) 55'
WG	23	Chay Mullins		(substituted on) 36'
Coach:
Richie Murphy

FB	15	Robin McClintock	(substituted off) 28'
RW	14	Ross McKnight	(substituted off) 71'
OC	13	Duncan Munn
IC	12	Andy Stirrat
LW	11	Ben Evans
FH	10	Christian Townsend
SH	9	Murray Redpath	(substituted off) 57'
N8	8	Rhys Tait	(substituted off) 67'
OF	7	Tim Brown
BF	6	Matt Deehan	(substituted off) 59'
RL	5	Max Williamson
LL	4	Josh Taylor
TP	3	Gregor Scougall	(substituted off) 59'
HK	2	Paddy Harrison	(substituted off) 71'
LP	1	Mikey Jones	(substituted off) 44'
Replacements:
HK	16	Duncan Hood	(substituted on) 71'
PR	17	Ali Rogers	(substituted on) 44'
PR	18	Corey Bowker	(substituted on) 59'
LK	19	Innes Hill	(substituted on) 59'
BR	20	Robert Gordon	(substituted on) 67'
BR	21	Jonty Cope	(substituted on) 57'
WG	22	Thomas Glendinning	(substituted on) 71'
WG	23	Kieran Clark	(substituted on) 28'
Coach:
Kenny Murray

20 March 2022
20:00

France	26–22	England (1 BP)
Try: Yemsi 3' c Reybier 62' c Con: Barre 4'; Auriac 63'; Pen: Barre 19'; Auriac (3) 49', 65', 74'	Report	Try: Arundell 52' m Penalty try 71'; Brooke 76' c Con: Johnson 76'; Pen: Johnson 2'

Stade Aimé Giral, Perpignan
Referee: AJ Jacobs (South Africa)
