= 2024–25 Munster Rugby season =

Munster Rugby
- Full name: Munster Rugby
- Union: (Ireland) IRFU
- Nickname: The Red Army
- Founded: 1879; 147 years ago
- Location: Limerick and Cork, Ireland
- Ground(s): Thomond Park (Capacity: 25,600) (Note: Thomond Park's official capacity is 25,600 but can be expanded up to 26,276 with temporary seating.); Musgrave Park (Capacity: 8,800)
- Chairman: Gerry O'Shea
- CEO: Ian Flanagan
- President: Michael Carroll
- Coach: Mike Prendergast (interim)
- Captain: Tadhg Beirne
- Top scorer: Jack Crowley : 112
- Most tries: Tom Farrell : 10
- League(s): United Rugby Championship (2024-25); European Champions Cup (2024-25)
- 2024-25: URC : 6th (ladder); Quarter-final (play-offs); Irish Shield - 2nd EPCR CC : Quarter-final
1st kit	2nd kit	3rd kit

Official website
- www.munsterrugby.ie
- Current season

The 2024–25 season was Munster Rugby's fourth season in the United Rugby Championship, and their 137th season of representative rugby since their foundation. Along with competing in the URC and its Irish Shield competition, the club also participated in the 2024-25 European Rugby Champions Cup, their 31st season of European and professional competition.

On 29 October 2024, Munster announced the departure of Graham Rowntree by mutual agreement after four losses in six games in the United Rugby Championship. Ian Costello took over as interim head coach. In February, Munster announced that New Zealander Clayton McMillan had agreed to take the role from the end of the season, and that Mike Prendergast would take the interim role for the remainder of the campaign.

Following a poor start, including four losses from six games in the league, that was eventually to cost coach Graham Rowntree his position, the province was able to salvage its position somewhat, making the knock-out stages of both the European Rugby Champions Cup and the United Rugby Championship; in the former, an impressive away win in the Round of 16 at Stade Rochelais led to a quarter-final defeat against eventual champions Bordeaux Begles (UBB); in the latter Munster were eliminated after a penalty shoot-out in the quarter-final away to Sharks.

Munster Rugby drew an average home attendance of 14,437 in the 2024-25 URC season.

== Senior squad ==
=== Coaching and management staff ===
Position	Name	Nationality
Head coach	vacant Mike Prendergast (interim)	Ireland
Attack coach	Mike Prendergast	Ireland
Forwards coach	Andi Kyriacou	England
Defence coach	Denis Leamy	Ireland
Skills coach	Mossy Lawler	Ireland
Performance analyst and technical coach	George Murray	Ireland
Team manager	Niall O'Donovan	Ireland
Head of rugby operations	Ian Costello	Ireland
Head of athletic performance	Ged McNamara	Ireland
Strength and conditioning coach	Adam Sheehan	Ireland

=== Senior squad ===
Munster Rugby senior squad
**Props**: (Ireland) **Stephen Archer**; (Ireland) Mark Donnelly; (Ireland) **Oli Jager**; (Ireland) **Dave Kilcoyne**; (Ireland) **Jeremy Loughman**; (Ireland) **John Ryan**; (Ireland) Roman Salanoa; (Ireland) Josh Wycherley; **Hookers**: (Ireland) Diarmuid Barron; (Ireland) Scott Buckley; (Ireland) **Niall Scannell**; **Locks**: (Ireland) Thomas Ahern; (Ireland) **Tadhg Beirne** (c); (Ireland) Edwin Edogbo; (Ireland) Cian Hurley; (South Africa) **Jean Kleyn**; (Ireland) **Fineen Wycherley**	**Back row**: (Ireland) **Gavin Coombes**; (Ireland) Jack Daly; (Ireland) Brian Gleeson; (Ireland) John Hodnett; (Ireland) Alex Kendellen; (Ireland) **Jack O'Donoghue**; (Ireland) **Peter O'Mahony**; **Scrum-halves**: (Ireland) **Craig Casey**; (Ireland) Ethan Coughlan; (Ireland) **Conor Murray**; (Ireland) Paddy Patterson; **Fly-halves**: (Ireland) **Billy Burns**; (Ireland) Tony Butler; (Ireland) **Jack Crowley**	**Centres**: (Ireland) Tom Farrell; (New Zealand) Alex Nankivell; (Ireland) Seán O'Brien; (Ireland) **Rory Scannell**; **Back three**: (South Africa) Thaakir Abrahams; (Ireland) Patrick Campbell; (Ireland) Liam Coombes; (Ireland) **Shane Daly**; (Ireland) **Mike Haley**; (Ireland) Diarmuid Kilgallen; (Ireland) **Calvin Nash**
(c) denotes the team captain, **Bold** denotes internationally capped players.^{*} denotes players qualified to play for Ireland on residency or dual nationality.^{ST} denotes a short-term signing.^{L} denotes a player on loan at the club. Players and their allocated positions from the Munster Rugby website.

== Academy squad ==
=== Coaching and management staff ===
Position	Name	Nationality
Academy and pathway manager	Gearóid Prendergast	Ireland
Elite player development officer	Brendan O'Connor	Ireland
Elite player development officer	Tommy O'Donnell	Ireland
Pathway development coach	Matt Brown	Ireland
National talent coach	Mark Butler	Ireland
Strength and conditioning coach	Danielle Cunningham	Ireland

=== Academy squad ===
Munster Rugby academy squad
**Props**: (Ireland) George Hadden **(2)**; (Ireland) Ronan Foxe **(2)**; (Ireland) Darragh McSweeney **(3)**; (Ireland) Kieran Ryan **(3)**; **Hookers**: (Ireland) Danny Sheahan **(1)**; (Ireland) Max Clein **(2)**; **Locks**: (Ireland) Michael Foy **(1)**; (Ireland) Evan O'Connell **(3)**	**Back row**: (Ireland) Seán Edogbo **(1)**; (Ireland) Luke Murphy **(1)**; (Ireland) Ruadhán Quinn **(3)**; **Scrum-halves**: (Ireland) Jake O'Riordan **(1)**; (Ireland) Jack Oliver **(3)**; **Fly-halves**: (Ireland) Dylan Hicks **(2)**	**Centres**: (Ireland) Gene O'Leary Kareem **(1)**; (Ireland) Fionn Gibbons **(3)**; **Back three**: (Ireland) Shay McCarthy **(2)**; (Ireland) Ben O'Connor **(2)**
**Bold** denotes internationally capped players, number in brackets indicates players stage in the three-year academy cycle.^{*} denotes players qualified to play for Ireland on residency or dual nationality. Players and their allocated positions from the Munster Rugby website.

== Transfers ==
=== Players in ===
- (Ireland) Diarmuid Kilgallen from (Ireland) Connacht
- (Ireland) Billy Burns from (Ireland) Ulster
- (Ireland) Tom Farrell from (Ireland) Connacht
- (South Africa) Thaakir Abrahams from (France) Lyon
- (Ireland) Edwin Edogbo promoted from Academy
- (Ireland) Tony Butler promoted from Academy
- (Ireland) Ethan Coughlan promoted from Academy
- (Ireland) Mark Donnelly promoted from Academy
- (Ireland) Brian Gleeson promoted from Academy
- (Ireland) Bryan Fitzgerald from (Ireland) Garryowen (short-term deal)
- (Ireland) Conor Bartley from (Ireland) Young Munster (short-term deal)
- (South Africa) Dian Bleuler from (South Africa) Sharks (short-term deal)
- (Ireland) Andrew Smith from (Ireland) Connacht (on loan)
- (Ireland) Lee Barron from (Ireland) Leinster (on loan)
- (Ireland) Michael Milne from (Ireland) Leinster (on loan)

=== Players out ===
- (Ireland) Joey Carbery to (France) Bordeaux
- (South Africa) RG Snyman to (Ireland) Leinster
- (Ireland) Simon Zebo retired
- (France) Antoine Frisch to (France) Toulon
- (Ireland) Daniel Okeke to (England) Coventry
- (Ireland) Jack O'Sullivan to (Japan) NTT DoCoMo Red Hurricanes Osaka
- (Ireland) Neil Cronin released
- (Ireland) Eoghan Clarke to (England) Saracens

== United Rugby Championship ==
=== Standings ===
Pos	Team	Pld	W	D	L	PF	PA	PD	TF	TA	TB	LB	Pts	Qualification
1	Leinster (CH)	18	16	0	2	542	256	+286	79	35	11	1	76	Qualifies for home URC quarter-final; Qualification for the 2025–26 Champions Cup
2	Bulls (RU)	18	14	0	4	542	361	+181	71	44	9	3	68	Qualifies for home URC quarter-final; Qualification for the 2025–26 Champions Cup
3	Sharks	18	13	0	5	436	402	+34	55	59	7	3	62	Qualifies for home URC quarter-final; Qualification for the 2025–26 Champions Cup
4	Glasgow Warriors	18	11	0	7	468	327	+141	70	40	10	5	59	Qualifies for home URC quarter-final; Qualification for the 2025–26 Champions Cup
5	Stormers	18	10	0	8	507	418	+89	66	57	11	4	55	Qualifies for URC quarter-final; Qualification for the 2025–26 Champions Cup
6	Munster	18	9	0	9	444	429	+15	67	59	11	4	51	Qualifies for URC quarter-final; Qualification for the 2025–26 Champions Cup
7	Edinburgh	18	8	1	9	471	407	+64	66	57	9	6	49	Qualifies for URC quarter-final; Qualification for the 2025–26 Champions Cup
8	Scarlets	18	9	1	8	427	382	+45	50	52	6	4	48	Qualifies for URC quarter-final; Qualification for the 2025–26 Champions Cup
9	Cardiff	18	8	1	9	409	477	−68	63	65	10	3	47	Qualification for the 2025–26 Challenge Cup
10	Benetton	18	9	1	8	393	478	−85	50	65	7	1	46	Qualification for the 2025–26 Challenge Cup
11	Lions	18	8	0	10	402	440	−38	53	60	5	3	40	Qualification for the 2025–26 Challenge Cup
12	Ospreys	18	7	1	10	437	454	−17	60	63	6	4	40	Qualification for the 2025–26 Challenge Cup
13	Connacht	18	6	0	12	420	472	−52	64	62	9	6	39	Qualification for the 2025–26 Challenge Cup
14	Ulster	18	7	0	11	414	506	−92	59	72	5	5	38	Qualification for the 2025–26 Challenge Cup
15	Zebre Parma	18	5	1	12	302	503	−201	38	72	3	4	29	Qualification for the 2025–26 Challenge Cup
16	Dragons	18	1	0	17	335	637	−302	43	92	1	4	9	Qualification for the 2025–26 Challenge Cup

Source: UnitedRugby.com
Rules for classification: Tiebreakers for teams tied on points: 1) Number of matches won 2) The difference between points for and points against 3) The number of tries scored 4) The most points scored 5) The difference between tries for and tries against 6) The fewest red cards received 7) The fewest yellow cards received.

=== Round 1 ===
21 September 2024	(1 BP) Munster (Ireland)	35–33	(Ireland) Connacht (2 BP)	Thomond Park, Limerick
17:30	Try: Nankivell 28' c Haley 31' c Hodnett 44' c Coombes 58' c Daly 69' c Con: Burns (3/3) 28', 32', 45'; Butler (2/2) 59', 70'		Try: Ioane 13' m B. Murphy (2) 20' c, 39' c Hawkshaw 53' c Forde 63' c Con: Ioane (3/4) 21', 54', 64'; Forde 40' (1/1)	Attendance: 15,705; Referee: Chris Busby (Ireland)

=== Round 2 ===
28 September 2024	(1 BP) Zebre Parma (Italy)	42–33	(Ireland) Munster (1 BP)	Stadio Sergio Lanfranchi, Parma
16:00	Try: Trulla (2) 22' m, 41' m Fusco (2) 26' c, 59' c Licata 51' c Prisciantelli 62' m Con: Montemauri (3/6) 27', 52' 60'; Pen: Montemauri 11'; Da Re 80'		Try: Coombes (2) 19' c, 30' c Haley 33' c Fitzgerald 40' c McCarthy 76' m Con: Butler (4/5) 20', 31', 34', 41'	Attendance: 2,300; Referee: Hollie Davidson (Scotland)

=== Round 3 ===
5 October 2024	(1 BP) Munster (Ireland)	23–0	(Wales) Ospreys	Musgrave Park, Cork
19:35	Try: McCarthy 1' m Farrell 26' m Nash 39' m O'Donoghue 63' m Pen: Crowley 9'			Attendance: 8,293; Referee: Mike Adamson (Scotland)

=== Round 4 ===
12 October 2024	(1 BP) Leinster (Ireland)	26–12	(Ireland) Munster	Croke Park, Dublin
17:45	Try: Lowe 5' c' Doris 10' c Keenan 14' c Snyman 40' m Con: Frawley (3/4) 6', 11', 15'		Try: O'Brien 34' m Haley 65' c Con: Crowley (1/2) 66'	Attendance: 80,468; Referee: Chris Busby (Ireland)

=== Round 5 ===
19 October 2024	Stormers (South Africa)	34–19	(Ireland) Munster	Cape Town Stadium, Cape Town
18:00	Try: Hartzenberg 5' c Theunissen 33' c R. Nel (2) 46' c, 80'+2; Con: Willemse (4/4) 6', 34', 47', 80'+3; Pen: Willemse 75'; Drop: Willemse 76'		Try: Farrell 17 c' Clarke 26' m Coombes 67' c Con: Crowley (2/3) 19', 68'	Attendance: 28,013; Referee: Mike Adamson, Scotland

=== Round 6 ===
26 October 2024	(1 BP) Sharks (South Africa)	41–24	(Ireland) Munster (1 BP)	Kings Park Stadium, Durban
16:00	Try: Fassi 0' c Mapimpi 4' c Williams 23' c Esterhuizen 36' c Tshituka 65' c Con: Jo. Hendrikse (5/5) 1', 5', 24', 37', 66'; Pen: Jo. Hendrikse (2) 13', 48'		Try: Ahern 18' m Haley 30' m Nash 73' c Beirne 80'; Con: Burns (2/2) 73', 80'+1	Attendance: 19,465; Referee: Hollie Davidson, Scotland

=== Round 7 ===
30 November 2024	Munster (Ireland)	17–10	(South Africa) Lions (1 BP)	Thomond Park, Limerick
19:35	Try: Abrahams 15' c S. Daly 42' m Kendellen 53' m Con: Burns (1/3) 16'		Try: van Wyk 27' c Con: Wolhuter (1/1) 28'; Pen: Wolhuter 32'	Attendance: 11,836; Referee: Adam Jones (Wales)

=== Round 8 ===
20 December 2024	'(1 BP)' Ulster (Ireland)	19–22	(Ireland) Munster (1 BP)	Ravenhill Stadium, Belfast
19:35	Try: O'Toole 7 c' Sheridan 64' m McNabney 75' c Con: Cooney (2/3) 8' 76	Report	Try: Farrell, 27', 51', 78' c S. Daly, 66'; Con: Crowley (1/4) 80'	Attendance: 14,313; Referee: Ben Whitehouse

=== Round 9 ===
27 December 2024	Munster (Ireland)	7–28	(Ireland) Leinster (1 BP)	Thomond Park, Limerick
19:35	Try: Ahern 44'; Con: Burns (1/1) 46'	Report	Try: McGrath 8'; Prendergast 32' van der Flier 53'; Doris 73'; Con: Prendergast (3/3) 9', 33', 53'; R. Byrne 74'	Attendance: 26,267

=== Round 10 ===
25 January 2025	Dragons (Wales)	19–38	(Ireland) Munster	Rodney Parade, Newport
19:35				Attendance: 4,562

=== Round 11 ===
15 February 2025	(1 BP) Munster (Ireland)	29-8	(Wales) Scarlets	Thomond Park, Limerick
17:15	Try: McCarthy, 20'c Coombes (2), 44', 63'; Kendellen, 51'c Farrell, 81'; Con: Burns (2)	Report	Try: Page, 57'; Pen: Lloyd, 17'	Attendance: 13,714

=== Round 12 ===
28 February 2025	(2 BP) Munster (Ireland)	28-34	(Scotland) Edinburgh (1 BP)	Musgrave Park, Cork
19:35	Try: Nankivell, 15'c, 51'c O'Connor, 64'c O'Brien, 80'c Con: Burns (3); Butler	Report	Try: Thompson, 23'c Currie, 28'c, 34', 57'; Bradbury, 39'c Con: Thompson (3); Pen: Thompson, 5'	Attendance: 8,800

=== Round 13 ===
21 March 2025	(1 BP) Glasgow Warriors (Scotland)	28–25	(Ireland) Munster (1 BP)	Scotstoun Stadium
7.35pm	Try: Horne, 27’c Steyn, 35’c Fagerson, 68’c McBeth, 75’c Con: Hastings (4)	Report	Try: Hodnett, 16’c O'Brien, 22’m, 65'c Con: Butler; Scannell; Pen: Butler, 32', 55'	Referee: (South Africa) Morne Ferreira

=== Round 14 ===
29 March 2025	(2 BP) Connacht (Ireland)	24-30	(Ireland) Munster (1 BP)	MacHale Park, Castlebar, County Mayo
14:30	Try: Jansen, 21', 62'; Blade, 45'; Ioane, 73'; Con: Ioane, 45'; Hanrahan, 63'	Report:ESPN	Try: Ahern, 24', Casey, 23'; Crowley, 51'; Barron, 59'; Con: Crowley, 52', 13'; Pen: Crowley, 7', 38'	Attendance: 27,580

=== Round 15 ===
19 April 2025	(1 BP) Munster (Ireland)	13 - 16	(South Africa) Bulls	Thomond Park, Limerick
17:15	Try: Abrahams, 37'; Con: Crowley, 38'; Pen: Crowley, 9', 51'	Report	Try: Coetzee,16'; Con: Goosen, 16'; Pen: Goosen, 23', 49'; Johannes, 73'	Attendance: 14,733; Referee: Andrea Piardi

=== Round 16 ===
25 April 2025	(1 BP) Cardiff (Wales)	26 - 21	(Ireland) Munster (1 BP)	Cardiff Arms Park
19:35	Try: Hamer-Webb, 26'; Millard, 28' penalty try, 54'; Mulder, 63'; Con: Sheedy, 28', 64'	Report, 2	Try: Nash, 12'; Haley, 37'; Farrell, 50'; Con: Crowley, 13', 38', 51'	Attendance: 11,253; Referee: Gianluca Gnecchi

=== Round 17 ===
9 May 2025	(1 BP) Munster (Ireland)	38 – 20	(Ireland) Ulster	Thomond Park, Limerick
19:35	Try: Milne, 13'; Farrell, 24', 55'; Beirne, 28'; Scannell, 35'; O'Mahony, 58'; Con: Crowley, 29', 36', 56', 59'	Report, 2	Try: McCloskey, 6'; Postlethwaite, 26'; Con: Murphy, 7', 27'; Pen: Murphy, 18', 41'	Attendance: 17,684

=== Round 18 ===
16 May 2025	(1 BP) Munster (Ireland)	30–21	(Italy) Benetton	Musgrave Park, Cork
20:00	Try: Crowley, 14'; Barron, 44'; Abrahams, 49'; Wycherley, 73'; Con: Crowley, 15'; Casey, 50'; Pen: Crowley, 21'; Casey, 57'		Try: Rhyno Smith, 19', 28'; Bautista Bernasconi, 69'; Con: Jacob Umaga, 20', 29', 70'	Attendance: 8,800

Munster Rugby qualify for the play-offs.

=== Play-offs ===
==== Bracket ====
Quarter-finals
1	(Ireland) Leinster	33
8	(Wales) Scarlets	21
4	(Scotland) Glasgow Warriors	36
5	(South Africa) Stormers	18
3	(South Africa) Sharks	24 ^{(6)}
6	(Ireland) Munster	24 ^{(4)}
2	(South Africa) Bulls	42
7	(Scotland) Edinburgh	33

Semi-finals
1	(Ireland) Leinster	37
4	(Scotland) Glasgow Warriors	19
2	(South Africa) Bulls	25
3	(South Africa) Sharks	13

Final
1	(Ireland) Leinster	32
2	(South Africa) Bulls	7

==== Quarter-final ====
31 May 2025
5:30pm

Sharks (South Africa)	24-24 (a.e.t.)	(Ireland) Munster
Try: Hooker, 46'; Fassi, 68'; Mbatha, 73'; Con: Jaden Hendrikse, 47', 69', 74'; Pen: Jaden Hendrikse, 55'		Try: Nash, 10'; Josh Wycherley, 57'; Kilgallen, 61'; Con: Crowley, 11', 58', 62'; Pen: Murray, 77'
	Penalties
Jordan Hendrikse; Jaden Hendrikse; Davids; Jordan Hendrikse; Jaden Hendrikse; Davids	6-4	Crowley; Scannell; Murray; Crowley; Scannell

Kings Park Stadium, Durban
Attendance: 22,247

Munster are eliminated from the Championship.

== URC Irish Shield ==
2024–25 United Rugby Championship Regional Shield Pools
(Ireland) Irish Shield
	Team	P	W	D	L	PF	PA	PD	TF	TA	TBP	LBP	Pts	Pos overall
1	(Ireland) Leinster (S)	6	6	0	0	175	80	+95	26	11	5	0	29	1
2	(Ireland) Munster	6	4	0	2	144	150	–6	22	22	4	0	20	6
3	(Ireland) Ulster	6	2	0	4	125	162	–37	16	26	1	2	11	14
4	(Ireland) Connacht	6	0	0	6	115	167	–52	18	23	3	3	6	13
If teams are level at any stage, tiebreakers are applied in the following order: 1. number of matches won 2. the difference between points for and points against 3. the number of tries scored 4. the most points scored 5. the difference between tries for and tries against 6. the fewest red cards received 7. the fewest yellow cards received
Green background indicates teams currently leading the regional shield. Upon the conclusion of the regular season, these teams win their respective regional shields. (S) : URC Shield champion

== European Rugby Champions Cup ==
European Rugby Champions Cup Pool 3
Pos	Team	Pld	W	D	L	PF	PA	PD	TF	TA	TB	LB	Pts	Qualification
1	(England) Northampton Saints (3)	4	3	0	1	137	106	+31	20	15	4	0	16	Home Champions Cup round of 16.
2	(France) Castres (6)	4	3	0	1	105	86	+19	13	13	2	0	14	Home Champions Cup round of 16.
3	(Ireland) Munster (9)	4	2	0	2	96	69	+27	13	7	2	2	12	Away Champions Cup round of 16.
4	(England) Saracens (13)	4	2	0	2	91	71	+20	11	9	2	1	11	Away Champions Cup round of 16.
5	(South Africa) Bulls (11CC)	4	1	0	3	84	113	−29	12	15	1	0	5	Away Challenge Cup round of 16.
6	(France) Stade Français	4	1	0	3	76	144	−68	11	21	1	0	5	

Source: EPCR
Rules for classification: Tiebreakers for teams tied on points: 1) Number of matches won; 2) Difference between points for and against; 3) Total number of points for; 4) Aggregate number of points scored in matches between tied teams; 5) Number of matches won excluding the first match, then the second and so on until the tie is settled.

Pool matches

=== Round 1 ===
7 December 2024	(1 BP) Munster (Ireland)	33–7	(France) Stade Français	Thomond Park, Limerick
17:30	Try: Abrahams 15' c Daly 29' c Kendellen 49' c Farrell 54' c Coombes 78' m Con: Crowley (4/5) 16', 30', 50', 55'	Report	Try: Castets 58' c Con: Henry (1/1) 59'	Attendance: 17,241; Referee: Luke Pearce (England)

=== Round 2 ===
13 December 2024	Castres (France)	16–14	(Ireland) Munster (1 BP)	Stade Pierre-Fabre, Castres
20:00	Try: Papali'i 12' m Walcker 29' m Pen: Fernandez (1/1) 48'; Le Brun (1/1) 72'	Report	Try: Hodnett (2) 37' c, 68' c Con: Crowley (2/2) 38', 69'	Attendance: 9,615; Referee: Christophe Ridley (England)

=== Round 3 ===
11 January 2025	Munster (Ireland)	17–12	(England) Saracens (1 BP)	Thomond Park, Limerick
17:30	Try: Bleuler 59'; Hodnett 64' c Con: Crowley (1/1) 60'; Pen: Crowley (2/3) 25', 65'	Report	Pen: Lozowski (3/3) 1', 10', 69'; Daly (1/1) 45'	Attendance: 22,030; Referee: Pierre Brousset (France)

=== Round 4 ===
18 January 2025	(1 BP) Northampton Saints (England)	34–32	(Ireland) Munster (1 BP)	cinch Stadium at Franklin's Gardens, Northampton
15:15	Try: Seabrook (3) 13' m, 48' m, 67' c Langdon 40+1' c Ramm 54' c Con: Smith (3/5) 40+2', 55', 68'; Pen: Smith (1/1) 59'	Report	Try: Nash (2) 22' c, 32' m Kilgallen (2) 63' c, 78' c Con: Crowley (3/4) 23', 64', 79'; Pen: Crowley (2/2) 32', 57'	Attendance: 15,153; Referee: Nika Amashukeli (Georgia)

Knockout stages

Round of 16
1	(France) Bordeaux Bègles	43
16	(Ireland) Ulster	31
8	(France) La Rochelle	24
9	(Ireland) Munster	25
4	(France) Toulon	72
13	(England) Saracens	42
5	(France) Toulouse	38
12	(England) Sale Sharks	15
2	(Ireland) Leinster	62
15	(England) Harlequins	0
7	(Scotland) Glasgow Warriors	43
10	(England) Leicester Tigers	19
3	(England) Northampton Saints	46
14	(France) Clermont	24
6	(France) Castres	39
11	(Italy) Benetton	37

Quarter-finals
1	(France) Bordeaux Bègles	47
9	(Ireland) Munster	29
4	(France) Toulon	18
5	(France) Toulouse	21
2	(Ireland) Leinster	52
7	(Scotland) Glasgow Warriors	0
3	(England) Northampton Saints	51
6	(France) Castres	16

Semi-finals
1	(France) Bordeaux Bègles	35
5	(France) Toulouse	18
2	(Ireland) Leinster	34
3	(England) Northampton Saints	37

Final
1	(France) Bordeaux Bègles	28
3	(England) Northampton Saints	20

=== Round of 16 ===
Munster finished their European Rugby Champions Cup pool campaign as the ninth seed, and were therefore drawn away in the round of 16 to the eighth seed, La Rochelle.

5 April 2025	La Rochelle (France) (8)	24–25; HT : 10–7	(9) (Ireland) Munster	Stade Marcel-Deflandre, La Rochelle
18:30	Try: Botia, 10'; Penalty try, 65'; Bosmorin, 76'; Con: West, 11'; Hastoy, 76'; Pen: West, 42'	Report:EPRC	Try: Casey, 24'; Coombes, 47'; Smith 51'; Con: Crowley, 24', 48'; Pen: Crowley, 41'; Drop: Crowley, 68'	Attendance: 16,700; Referee: Andrea Piardi (Italy)

=== Quarterfinal ===
12 April 2025	Bordeaux (France) (1)	47–29	(9) (Ireland) Munster	Stade Chaban-Delmas, Bordeaux
16:00	Try: Penaud, 5’ Lucu, 12’ Samu, 24’ Echegaray, 33’ Lamothe, 56’ Bielle-Biarrey, 77’ Con: Jalibert, 13', 25', 34', 78'; Pen: Jalibert, 11', 53', 76'	Report	Try: Nankivell, 43’ Smith, 50', 72' penalty try, 67'; Con: Crowley 33', 73'; Pen: Crowley, 9'	Attendance: 32,215; Referee: Nika Amashukeli (Georgia)

Munster are eliminated from the competition.

== Friendlies and challenge matches ==
31 August 2024	Bath Rugby (England)	24–21	(Ireland) Munster	Recreation Ground
18:30		Report		Attendance: 9.603

6 September 2024	Munster (Ireland)	19–33	(England) Gloucester Rugby	Musgrave Park
18:30		Report		Attendance: 4,487

2 November 2024	Munster (Ireland)	24–38	(New Zealand) All Blacks XV	Thomand Park
18:30		Report		Attendance: 26,267

== Overall Record ==
Competitive ties only:

(Ireland) Munster Rugby	Played	Won	Drawn	Lost	%	PF	PA	+/-	TF	TA	+/-
(Ireland) Munster Rugby	16	12	1	12	50.00	618	593	+25	90	78	+12

== Home attendance ==
End of season.

Domestic League						European Cup						Total	
League	Fixtures	Total Attendance	Average Attendance	Highest	Lowest	League	Fixtures	Total Attendance	Average Attendance	Highest	Lowest	Total Attendance	Average Attendance
2024–25 United Rugby Championship	9	129,931	14,437	26,267	8,193	2024–25 European Rugby Champions Cup	2	39,271	19,636	22,030	17,241	169,104	15,378
