= Conor Moloney =

Irish rugby union player (born 2002)

- Born: 18 July 2002 (age 24) Kildysart, County Clare, Ireland
- Height: 1.89 m (6 ft 2 1/2 in)
- Weight: 110 kg (17 st; 240 lb)

Rugby union career
- Position: Back-row
Amateur team(s)
Years	Team	Apps	(Points)
- Ennis
- Young Munster
Senior career
Years	Team	Apps	(Points)
2021–	Munster	1	(0)
- Correct as of 12 December 2021
International career
Years	Team	Apps	(Points)
2022–	Ireland U20	1	(0)
- Correct as of 11 February 2022

Conor Moloney (born 18 July 2002) is an Irish rugby union player. He plays in the back-row and represents Limerick club Young Munster in the amateur All-Ireland League.

== Young Munster ==
Moloney was part of the Young Munster team that defeated Garryowen 11–8 to win the 2021–22 Munster Senior Cup in March 2022.

== Munster ==
Born in Kildysart, Moloney first began playing rugby with Ennis and represented Munster and Ireland at various underage levels, including 'A' level for Munster, as well as joining Young Munster in the AIL. Following the disruption caused by the province's recent tour to South Africa, Moloney was registered with Munster's Champions Cup squad, and made his senior competitive debut for Munster in their opening 2021–22 Champions Cup fixture away to English club Wasps on 12 December 2021, coming on as a replacement for John Hodnett in the province's 35–14 win alongside fellow Ennis RFC men Tony Butler and Ethan Coughlan.

== Ireland ==
Moloney was selected in the Ireland under-20s squad for the 2022 Six Nations Under 20s Championship when it was announced in January 2022, and he made his competitive debut for the team in their 17–16 away win against France on 11 February. Ireland went on to win the Grand Slam in the tournament.

== Honours ==
=== Young Munster ===
- Munster Senior Cup:
  - Winner (1): 2021–22

=== Ireland under-20s ===
- Six Nations Under 20s Championship:
  - Winner (1): 2022
- Grand Slam:
  - Winner (1): 2022
- Triple Crown:
  - Winner (1): 2022
