= Ethan Coughlan =

Irish rugby union player (born 2002)

- Born: 13 April 2002 (age 24) Ennis, County Clare, Ireland
- Height: 1.75 m (5 ft 9 in)
- Weight: 81 kg (12.8 st; 179 lb)
- School: Rice College
- University: Limerick Senior College

Rugby union career
- Position: Scrum-half
Amateur team(s)
Years	Team	Apps	(Points)
- Ennis
2020–	Shannon		
Senior career
Years	Team	Apps	(Points)
2021–	Munster	32	(15)
- Correct as of 21 March 2026
International career
Years	Team	Apps	(Points)
2019	Ireland U18	2	(0)
2022	Ireland U20	7	(0)
- Correct as of 5 July 2022

Ethan Coughlan (born 13 April 2002) is an Irish rugby union player who plays as a scrum-half for United Rugby Championship club Munster.

== Early life ==
Born in County Clare, Coughlan first began playing rugby aged 11 with Ennis, with whom he won an under-16 title in 2018 and a shared under-18 cup in 2020. As well as rugby, Coughlan also played association football and enjoyed success in football and hurling with St Joseph's Doora-Barefield GAA, winning a Minor A football title in 2018 to go with under-16 titles in both sports. In 2020, Coughlan joined famous Limerick club Shannon to play in the amateur All-Ireland League. Previously a student at Rice College, Coughlan now studies sports strength and conditioning at Limerick Senior College.

== Munster ==
Coughlan's success with Ennis saw him progress to regional squads with Munster and join the National Talent Squad. During the 2020–21 season, he trained with Munster's senior squad on several occasions, providing cover at scrum-half during periods of injury and international absence, and travelling with the matchday squad for league and European fixtures, whilst also representing the province at 'A' level. Ahead of the 2021–22 season, Coughlan joined Munster's academy as one of three year one recruits. Following the disruption caused by the province's recent tour to South Africa, Coughlan made his senior competitive debut for Munster in their opening 2021–22 Champions Cup fixture away to English club Wasps on 12 December 2021, coming on as a replacement for Conor Murray in the province's 35–14 win, alongside fellow Ennis RFC men Conor Moloney and Tony Butler.

== Ireland ==
Coughlan captained the Ireland under-18s in Italy in 2019, and was selected for a talent camp for the Ireland under-20s in May 2021. He was selected in the Ireland under-20s squad for the 2022 Six Nations Under 20s Championship when it was announced in January 2022, and made his competitive debut for the under-20s in their tournament-opening 53–5 win against Wales on 4 February, coming on for starting scrum-half Matthew Devine in the 52nd minute. One week later, Coughlan was promoted to the starting XV for Ireland's 17–16 away win against France, before being used as a replacement in Ireland's 39–12 win against Italy on 25 February, the 42–27 away win against England on 12 March, and the 59–5 home win against Scotland on 20 March that secured a Grand Slam for Ireland.

Coughlan was retained in the squad for the Under-20s Summer Series when it was announced in June 2022, and started in Ireland's opening 42–21 defeat against France on 24 June, before also starting in the 37–36 win against England on 5 July.

== Honours ==
=== Ireland under-20s ===
- Six Nations Under 20s Championship:
  - Winner (1): 2022
- Grand Slam:
  - Winner (1): 2022
- Triple Crown:
  - Winner (1): 2022
