= Josh Taylor (rugby union) =

Scottish rugby union player

- Full name: Josh Taylor
- University: Brunel University

Rugby union career
- Position: Flanker / Number eight
- Current team: Northampton Saints
Youth career
- -: London Irish
- –: Ealing Trailfinders
Senior career
Years	Team	Apps	(Points)
2023–2026	Ealing Trailfinders	39	(55)
2026–	Northampton Saints	0	(0)
- Correct as of 11 July 2026
International career
Years	Team	Apps	(Points)
2021–2022	Scotland U20	9	(10)
- Correct as of 11 July 2026

Josh Taylor is a Scottish rugby union player who plays as a back-row forward for Northampton Saints in Premiership Rugby. A product of the London Irish and Ealing Trailfinders academy systems, he captained Ealing during the 2025–26 season before signing for Northampton Saints in 2026. Taylor has also represented Scotland Under-20 at international level.

== Early life ==
Taylor attended Reading Blue Coat School and came through the London Irish academy before joining the Ealing Trailfinders academy in 2019. Alongside his rugby career, he studied Sport and Exercise Science at Brunel University.

== Club career ==
=== Ealing Trailfinders ===
Taylor joined the Ealing Trailfinders academy in 2019 and made his senior debut in the Premiership Rugby Cup in September 2023. Initially playing as a lock, he later established himself as a back-row forward.

During the 2025–26 season Taylor became a regular captain for Ealing Trailfinders as the club won another RFU Championship title. He made 39 senior appearances and scored 11 tries before leaving the club at the end of the season to join Northampton Saints.

=== Northampton Saints ===
On 29 April 2026, Northampton Saints announced that Taylor had signed a long-term contract ahead of the 2026–27 Premiership Rugby season. Director of Rugby Phil Dowson described him as an athletic back-row forward with significant potential, while Taylor said the move would provide an opportunity to continue his development.

== International career ==
Taylor represented Scotland Under-20 during the 2021 and 2022 seasons, earning nine caps and scoring two tries. He featured in the 2022 Six Nations Under 20s Championship and the 2022 World Rugby Under 20 Championship. In 2025, he was selected for the Emerging Scotland squad.
