= Lorenzo Giovanchelli =

Italian rugby union player

- Born: 19 July 1986 (age 40) Italy
- Height: 1.89 m (6 ft 2 in)
- Weight: 113 kg (17 st 11 lb; 249 lb)

Rugby union career
- Position: Hooker
- Current team: I Cavalieri Prato
Youth career
- 2005−2006: Stade Français
Senior career
Years	Team	Apps	(Points)
2006−2009	Petrarca Padova	56	(15)
2009−2014	I Cavalieri Prato	121	(20)
2014	→Zebre	3	(0)
2014−2015	San Donà	18	(20)
2015	→Zebre	2	(0)
2015−2018	Calvisano	55	(30)
2018−2019	I Medicei	25	(20)
2020−present	I Cavalieri Prato		
- Correct as of 5 June 2020
International career
Years	Team	Apps	(Points)
2006	Italy Under 21	3	(0)
- Correct as of 5 June 2020

Lorenzo Giovanchelli (born 19 July 1986) is an Italian rugby union player. His usual position is as a Hooker, and he currently plays for I Medicei.

From 2014 to 2015, he played for Zebre as an Additional Player.

In 2006 Giovanchelli was named in the Italy Under 21 squad.
