= Lapo Frangini =

Italian rugby union player (born 2002)

- Born: 9 February 2002 (age 24) Bagno a Ripoli, Italy
- Height: 185 cm (6 ft 1 in)
- Weight: 107 kg (236 lb; 16 st 12 lb)

Rugby union career
- Position: hooker
- Current team: Rovigo Delta
Youth career
- I Medicei
- Firenze Rugby 1931
- 2020−2022: F.I.R. Academy
- 2022: Benetton Academy
Senior career
Years	Team	Apps	(Points)
2022–2024	Benetton	1	(0)
2023	Rangers Vicenza	6	(0)
2023−2024	Mogliano	11	(0)
2024−	Rovigo Delta		
- Correct as of 02 Mar 2026
International career
Years	Team	Apps	(Points)
2019	Italy U18		
2021–2022	Italy U20	8	(15)
2023	Italy U23		
- Correct as of 02 Mar 2026

Lapo Frangini (born 9 February 2002) is an Italian professional rugby union player who primarily plays hooker for Rovigo Delta in Serie A Elite.

== Professional career ==
He previously played for clubs such as I Medicei and Firenze Rugby 1931. Frangini signed for Benetton Rugby in April 2022 ahead of the 2022–23 United Rugby Championship as Academy Player.

He made his debut in Round 9 of the 2022–23 season against the Connacht.

From April 2023 to the end of the season he also played for Rangers Vicenza in the Serie A and in 2023–24 season for Italian Serie A Elite team Mogliano, on loan, as Additional Player.

In Rovigo Delta, his colleagues, as hookers, are Filippo Cadorini and Enrico Giulian.

In 2019 was named in Italy U18s, in 2021 and 2022 Frangini was named in Italy U20s squad for annual Six Nations Under 20s Championship.

On 10 January 2023, he was named in Italy A squad for a uncapped test against Romania A. On 30 November 2023 he was called in Italy Under 23 squad for test series against IRFU Combined Academies.
