= Connor Sa =

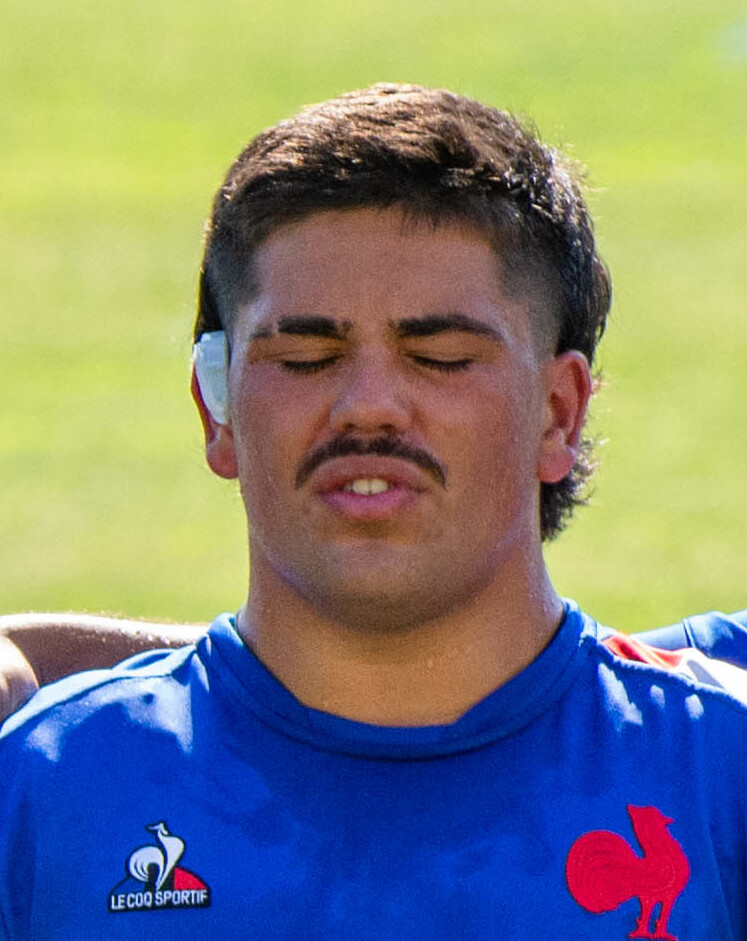
- Sa with France U20 in 2022
- Born: 22 January 2002 (age 24) Auckland, New Zealand
- Height: 1.83 m (6 ft 0 in)
- Weight: 103 kg (227 lb)
- Notable relative: Salemane Sa (father)

Rugby union career
- Position: Hooker
- Current team: Bordeaux Bègles
Youth career
- 2015–2022: Bordeaux Bègles
Senior career
Years	Team	Apps	(Points)
2022–	Bordeaux Bègles	38	(20)
2022–2023	→ Carcassonne	15	(5)
- Correct as of 22:37, 4 April 2026 (UTC)
International career
Years	Team	Apps	(Points)
2021–2022	France U20	7	(15)

Connor Sa (born 22 January 2002) is a professional rugby union player who plays as a hooker for Bordeaux Bègles. Born in New Zealand, he played for the France under-20 team.

== Early life ==
Sa was born in suburban Auckland to rugby union prop Salemane Sa (born 1980). He grew up in France, where his father played for teams including Bordeaux Bègles.

== Club career ==
Sa was a youth player at Bordeaux Bègles and signed his first professional contract of three years in May 2022, before being loaned to Carcassonne of the Pro D2 in the same month. He played nine games, of which two as a starter; on 9 September he scored a late try in a 26–24 home win over local rivals Béziers.

Sa returned to Bordeaux Bègles in December 2022 due to Pablo Dimcheff's injury, and made his Top 14 debut on 23 December against La Rochelle, winning 12–8 away. In the following January, he played in Champions Cup losses against English teams Sale Sharks and Gloucester, and as Dimcheff was still out with an anterior cruciate ligament injury, his return was extended to the end of February.

Sa missed the entire 2023–24 season with an Achilles tendon rupture from a sprint in training. In January 2025, he extended his contract for two more years, and on 1 March he scored his first Top 14 try, in a 29–17 win at Perpignan. On 24 May, he played the last 18 minutes as a substitute as his club won the Champions Cup final 28–20 against Northampton Saints at the Millennium Stadium; on 28 June he also came off the bench in a 39–33 extra-time loss to Toulouse in the Top 14 final at the Stade de France.

== International career ==
Sa played for the France under-20 team at the Six Nations Under 20s Championship in 2021 and 2022. He played two games at the former, and in the latter he scored three tries, in wins against Wales (two tries) and Scotland.
