= Tony Butler (rugby union) =

Irish rugby union player (born 2002)

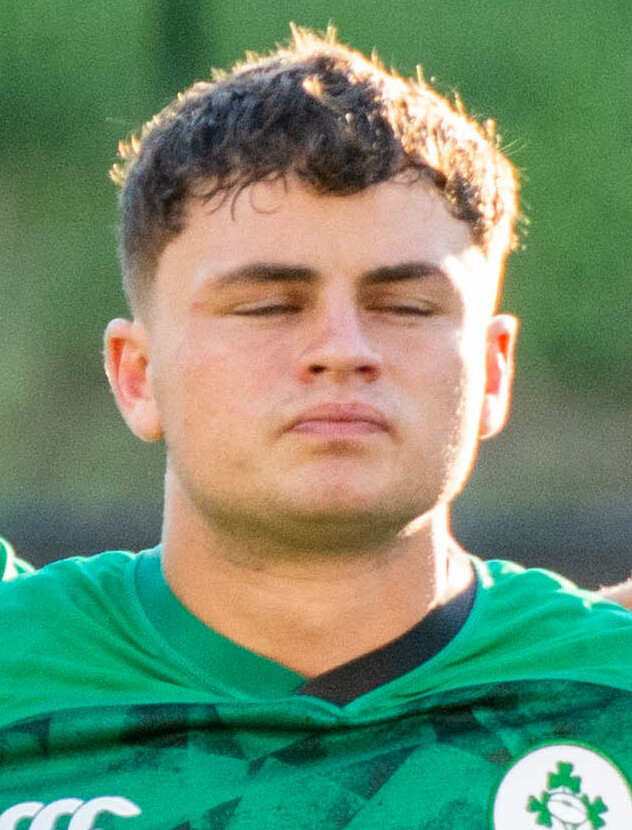
- Butler in 2022
- Born: 23 April 2002 (age 24) Ennis, Ireland
- Height: 1.78 m (5 ft 10 in)
- Weight: 84 kg (13.2 st; 185 lb)
- School: St Flannan's College
- University: University of Limerick

Rugby union career
- Position: Fly-half
Amateur team(s)
Years	Team	Apps	(Points)
- Ennis
2021–	Garryowen		
Senior career
Years	Team	Apps	(Points)
2021–	Munster	28	(77)
- Correct as of 30 January 2026
International career
Years	Team	Apps	(Points)
2022	Ireland U20	5	(14)
- Correct as of 24 June 2022

Tony Butler (born 23 April 2002) is an Irish rugby union player who plays as a fly-half. He is currently unattached to a club.

== Early life ==
Born in County Clare, Butler attended St Flannan's College. He first began playing rugby with Ennis, forming a half-back partnership with fellow Munster academy member Ethan Coughlan and captaining the club at underage level. As well as rugby, Butler was a talented hurler for St Joseph's Doora-Barefield, and started for Clare in their defeat against Limerick in the 2019 Munster Minor Hurling Championship final. He also helped St Flannan's win their first Dr Harty Cup in 15 years in March 2020. As student at the University of Limerick studying construction management and engineering, Butler joined Limerick club Garryowen ahead of the 2021–22 All-Ireland League.

== Munster ==
Butler progressed through the Munster youths system and, in September 2021, captained a Munster Development XV against Ulster. His debut for Munster's 'A' team followed in November, and in the same month Butler joined Munster's academy. Butler was registered with Munster's Champions Cup squad in December 2021 following the disruption caused by the province's recent tour to South Africa, and made his senior competitive debut for the province in their opening 2021–22 Champions Cup fixture away to English club Wasps on 12 December 2021, coming on as a replacement for Joey Carbery in the province's 35–14 win, alongside fellow Ennis RFC men Ethan Coughlan and Conor Moloney.

Butler was released by Munster at the end of the 2025–26 season.

== Ireland ==
Butler was selected in the Ireland under-20s squad for the 2022 Six Nations Under 20s Championship when it was announced in January 2022, and made his competitive debut for the under-20s in their tournament-opening 53–5 win against Wales on 4 February, coming on for starting fly-half Charlie Tector in the 52nd minute and converting Ben Brownlee's 79th minute try. Butler was as a replacement in Ireland's 39–12 win against Italy on 25 February, scoring two conversions, the 42–27 away win against England on 12 March, and the 59–5 home win against Scotland on 20 March that secured a Grand Slam for Ireland.

Butler was retained in the squad for the Under-20s Summer Series when it was announced in June 2022, and started in Ireland's opening 42–21 defeat against France on 24 June, scoring one conversion during the match.

== Honours ==
=== Ireland under-20s ===
- Six Nations Under 20s Championship:
  - Winner (1): 2022
- Grand Slam:
  - Winner (1): 2022
- Triple Crown:
  - Winner (1): 2022
