= Stephen Archer =

Irish rugby union player

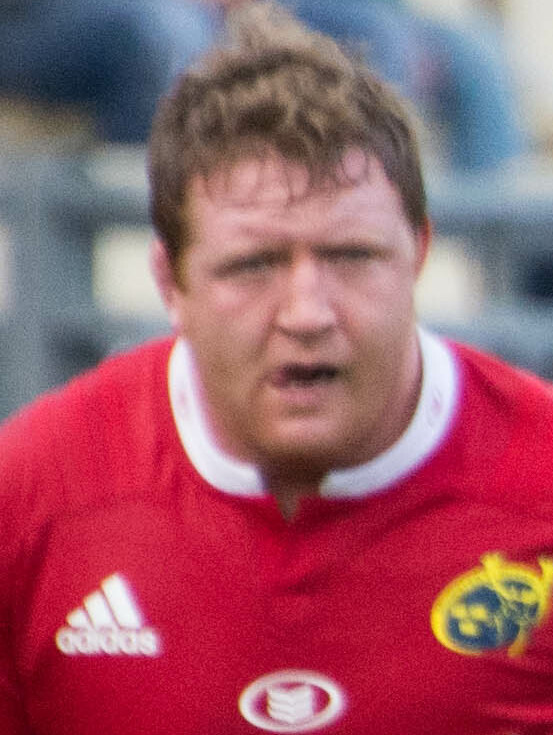
- Stephen Archer in 2017
- Born: 29 January 1988 (age 38) Cork, Ireland
- Height: 1.88 m (6 ft 2 in)
- Weight: 118 kg (18.6 st; 260 lb)
- School: Christian Brothers College

Rugby union career
- Position: Prop
Amateur team(s)
Years	Team	Apps	(Points)
- Cork Constitution
Senior career
Years	Team	Apps	(Points)
2009–2025	Munster	304	(30)
- Correct as of 31 May 2025
International career
Years	Team	Apps	(Points)
2008	Ireland U20	8	(5)
2012–2014	Ireland Wolfhounds	2	(0)
2013	Ireland	2	(0)
2015	Emerging Ireland	3	(0)
- Correct as of 22 June 2015

Stephen Archer (born 29 January 1988) is an Irish former rugby union player who played as a prop. He last played for United Rugby Championship club Munster.

== Munster ==
Archer made his Munster debut as a replacement against Edinburgh during a Celtic League fixture on 23 October 2009. He was part of the historic Munster team that beat Australia 15–6 at Thomond Park on 16 November 2010. He made his Heineken Cup debut as a replacement in Munster's Round 5 26–10 win against Castres on 14 January 2012, during the 2011–12 Heineken Cup.

Archer was part of the team that defeated newly crowned Heineken Cup champions, and arch-rivals, Leinster 19–9 in the 2011 Magners League Grand Final on 28 May 2011. With Munster A, Archer won the 2011–12 British and Irish Cup. He scored his first try for Munster in a 2011–12 Pro12 league fixture against Ulster on 5 May 2012. He signed a two-year contract extension with Munster in January 2013. In October 2015, Archer was ruled out for a number of months after sustaining a neck injury that required surgery.

Archer made his 150th appearance for Munster on 1 January 2018, doing so when he came off the bench against Ulster in a 2017–18 Pro14 fixture. He signed a two-year contract extension with Munster in January 2018. Archer made his 150th United Rugby Championship appearance in Munster's 37–28 win against Italian side Benetton in round 20 of the 2018–19 season on 12 April 2019. He won his 200th cap for Munster in their 2019–20 Pro14 round 7 fixture against Edinburgh on 29 November 2019, becoming the eleventh player to achieve the accolade for the province.

Archer signed a two-year contract extension with Munster in January 2020, and signed a one-year contract extension in January 2022. He won his 50th Champions Cup cap for Munster in their 26–10 home win against English club Exeter Chiefs in the second leg of their 2021–22 Champions Cup round of 16 clash on 16 April 2022, and he overtook Billy Holland to become the second most capped Munster player of all-time when he won his 248th cap for the province in their 36–17 away defeat against Ulster in the quarter-finals of the 2021–22 United Rugby Championship on 3 June 2022. Archer earned his 250th cap for Munster in their 2022–23 United Rugby Championship round three fixture against Italian side Zebre Parma on 1 October 2022, coming in as a replacement for Keynan Knox.

Archer signed a one-year contract extension with Munster in February 2023, and started in Munster's 19–14 win against the Stormers in the final of the 2022–23 United Rugby Championship on 27 May 2023.

In April 2025, Archer confirmed that he would be retiring at the end of the 2024–25 Munster Rugby season and played his final game for Munster on 31 May in the defeat to the Sharks in the Quarter-final of the 2024–25 United Rugby Championship. He retired as Munster's most-capped player.

== Ireland ==
Archer has represented Ireland at underage levels up to Under-20. He received his first senior call-up when he was selected in the Ireland Wolfhounds squad for their game against England Saxons in January 2012. He went on to make his Wolfhounds debut against England Saxons on 28 January 2012.

Archer was selected on the bench for Ireland's 2013 Six Nations Championship game against France on 9 March 2013, his first senior call-up, though he did not come on during the 13–13 draw. Archer made his senior debut for Ireland a week later, coming off the bench against Italy. On 23 October 2013, Archer was named in the Ireland squad for the 2013 Autumn Tests. He came off the bench against Australia on 16 November 2013 to win his second, and last cap.

Archer came off the bench for Ireland Wolfhounds against England Saxons on 25 January 2014. He was named in the Ireland squad for the 2014 Guinness Series on 21 October 2014. Archer was named in the Emerging Ireland squad for the 2015 World Rugby Tbilisi Cup on 19 May 2015. He started in the opening 25–0 win against Emerging Italy on 13 June 2015. Archer started in the 33–7 win against Uruguay on 17 June 2015. He also started in the 45–12 win against Georgia on 21 June 2015, a win which secured the tournament for Emerging Ireland.

== Honours ==
=== Munster ===
- United Rugby Championship:
  - Winner (2): 2010–11, 2022–23

=== Emerging Ireland ===
- World Rugby Tbilisi Cup
  - Winner (1): (2015)
