= Jack Boyle (rugby union) =

Irish rugby union player

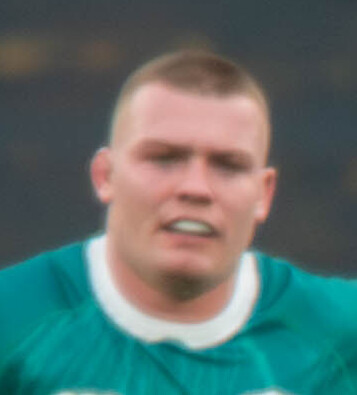
- Born: 10 March 2002 (age 24) Dublin, Ireland
- Height: 1.85 m (6 ft 1 in)
- Weight: 119 kg (18.7 st; 262 lb)
- School: St Michael's College

Rugby union career
- Position: Prop
Senior career
| Years | Team | Apps | (Points) |
| 2021– | Leinster | 38 | (15) |
- Correct as of 24 January 2026
International career
| Years | Team | Apps | (Points) |
| 2021–2022 | Ireland U20 | 9 | (5) |
| 2024– | Ireland | 4 | ((0)) |
- Correct as of 12 July 2025

Jack Boyle (born 10 March 2002) is an Irish rugby union player who plays for Leinster Rugby and the Ireland national rugby union team. He plays as a prop.

== Early life ==
Born in Dublin, Boyle attended St Michael's College and won a Leinster Schools Rugby Senior Cup with the school in 2019.

== Leinster ==
Boyle joined the Leinster academy ahead of the 2021–22 season, and made his senior debut for the province as a 54th minute replacement for Michael Milne in Leinster's 43–14 victory against Dragons on 18 February 2023.

== Ireland ==
Boyle played for the Ireland under-20s team that won a grand slam during the 2022 Six Nations Under 20s Championship.

During the 2025 Six Nations, he made his debut for the senior side, coming off the bench to replace Andrew Porter during a 27–18 victory over Wales.

== Honours ==
=== St. Michaels College ===
- Leinster Schools Rugby Senior Cup:
  - Winner (1): 2019

=== Leinster ===
- URC:
  - Winner (1): 2025

=== Ireland Under-20s ===
- Six Nations Under 20s Championship:
  - Winner (1): 2022
- Grand Slam:
  - Winner (1): 2022
- Triple Crown:
  - Winner (1): 2022

=== Ireland ===
- Triple Crown:
  - Winner (1): 2025
