= Alex Mann (rugby union) =

Welsh rugby union player

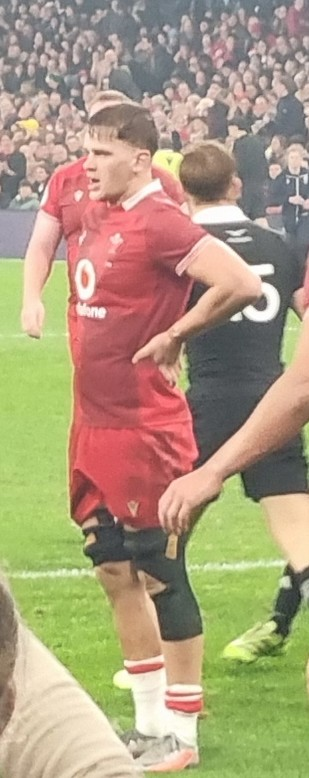
- 2025 Autumn Nations Series Wales vs New Zealand
- Born: 6 January 2002 (age 24) Merthyr Tydfil, Wales
- Height: 1.91 m (6 ft 3 in)
- Weight: 104 kg (229 lb; 16 st 5 lb)
- School: St. John the Baptist School

Rugby union career
- Position: Flanker
- Current team: Cardiff Rugby
Senior career
| Years | Team | Apps | (Points) |
| 2021– | Cardiff Rugby | 38 | (40) |
- Correct as of 18 November 2026
International career
| Years | Team | Apps | (Points) |
| 2018–2019 | Wales U18 | | |
| 2021–2022 | Wales U20 | 9 | (15) |
| 2024– | Wales | 16 | (10) |
- Correct as of 18 November 2026

Alex Mann (born 6 January 2002) is a Welsh professional rugby union player who plays as a flanker for United Rugby Championship club Cardiff Rugby and the Wales national team.

== Early life ==
Mann was born on the 6 of January 2002 in Merthyr Tydfil, Wales. He studied at St John The Baptist School, Aberdare.

Mann began playing rugby with local club Aberdare RFC.

== Club career ==
=== Cardiff Rugby ===
Mann was named in the Cardiff Rugby academy squad for the 2021–22 season.

He made his debut for Cardiff Rugby senior team in the second round of the 2021–22 European Rugby Champions Cup against Harlequins, coming on as a replacement.

Ahead of the 2023–24 United Rugby Championship season, Mann signed a development contract with Cardiff, before signing a senior contract on 17 January 2024. He signed an extension on 24 March 2026.

== International career ==
=== Wales U18 ===
In 2018, Mann was selected for Wales U18 for their tour to South Africa.

=== Wales U20 ===
Mann was named as captain for Wales U20 for the 2021 Six Nations Under 20s Championship. Mann started all five matches of the championship at flanker and scored a try in the Round 2 fixture against Ireland.

He retained the captaincy for the 2022 Six Nations Under 20s Championship.

During the Round 3 match against England, Mann received a red card, and was subsequently banned for three weeks. Following his suspension, Mann returned to the squad and was selected to start at flanker in the final round of the championship against Italy on 20 March 2022.

Mann was unavailable for the 2022 U20 Six Nations Summer Series due to injury.

=== Wales ===
On 16 January 2024, Mann was named in the Wales squad for the 2024 Six Nations Championship.

Mann made his senior international debut on 3 February 2024 against Scotland, coming off the bench and scoring a try, with his second try coming seven days later in his second Wales appearance, a 16-14 loss to England at Twickenham.

Mann was part of the Wales squad for the 2025 end-of-year rugby union internationals. During the final match against South Africa, he was eye-gouged by Eben Etzebeth. Etzebeth stated during the hearing he feared being ‘rag-dolled’ by Mann, and was banned for 12 weeks.

Mann was named in the squad for the 2026 Six Nations by Steve Tandy.. He was 1 of only 2 players to start for Wales in every game of the championship.

During the 2026 Six Nations championship, Mann also made history by completing the most tackles in a single Six Nations match against Ireland with a total of 33 tackles.

Mann finished the tournament as the leading tackler of the 2026 Six Nations, recording a total of 87 tackles—the highest of any player in the competition.

== Personal life ==
Mann was part of the Cardiff City F.C. academy for two years, playing as a centre–back, before returning to rugby at age 14.
