= Mike Prendergast (rugby union) =

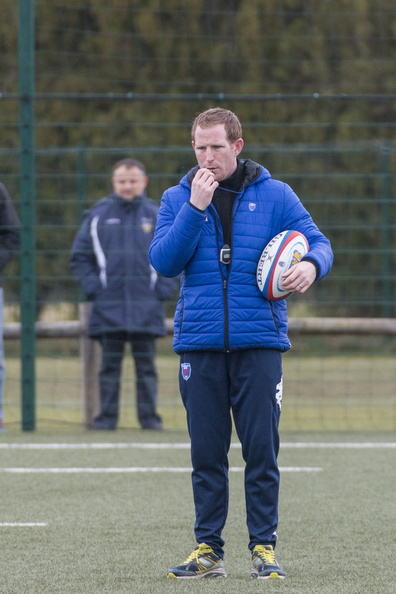
- Prendergast in 2015
- Born: 21 May 1977 (age 49) Limerick, Ireland
- Height: 1.78 m (5 ft 10 in)
- Weight: 84 kg (13.2 st; 185 lb)

Rugby union career
- Position: Scrum-half
Amateur team(s)
Years	Team	Apps	(Points)
- Young Munster
Senior career
Years	Team	Apps	(Points)
2001–2006	Munster	39	(15)
2006–2007	Bourgoin	21	(5)
2007–2008	Gloucester	10	(0)
2008–2009	Munster	9	(0)
2013–2014	Chambéry	6	
Coaching career
- Years: Team
- 2009–2013: Young Munster (Director of rugby)
- 2013–2017: Grenoble (Skills coach)
- 2017–2018: Oyonnax (Backs coach)
- 2018–2019: Stade Français (Backs coach)
- 2019–2022: Racing 92 (Backs coach)
- 2022–: Munster (Attack coach)

Mike Prendergast (born 21 May 1977) is an Irish rugby union coach who started his professional playing career with Munster. He also played a season with both Bourgoin in France and Gloucester in England before returning for one final season with Munster. He played as a scrum-half and represented Young Munster in the All-Ireland League.

Having previously been director of rugby for amateur Irish club Young Munster, Prendergast joined French club Grenoble as a skills coach in 2013, where former Leinster and Ireland hooker Bernard Jackman was then defence coach. Ahead of the 2017–18 Top 14 season, Prendergast joined Oyonnax as their attack coach, before joining Stade Français, where former Munster teammate Paul O'Connell was also a coach, as their backs and attack coach for the 2018–19 season, after Oyonnax were relegated from the Top 14.

After one season with Stade Français, Prendergast departed the club to join their Parisian rivals, Racing 92, where former Munster teammate Ronan O'Gara once coached and also where former Munster players Donnacha Ryan and Simon Zebo were playing at the time, as their backs coach on a long-term contract ahead of the 2019–20 season. Prendergast returned to Munster on a three-year contract from the 2022–23 season to join new head coach Graham Rowntree's coaching setup as an attack coach.
