= Rhys Barratt =

Welsh rugby union player

- Born: 27 October 2002 (age 24) Cardiff, Wales
- Height: 1.84 m (6 ft 0 in)
- Weight: 111 kg (245 lb; 17 st 7 lb)
- School: Coleg y Cymoedd

Rugby union career
- Position: Prop
- Current team: Cardiff
Senior career
Years	Team	Apps	(Points)
2022–	Cardiff	28	(0)
International career
Years	Team	Apps	(Points)
2022	Wales U20	7	(10)

Rhys Barratt (born 27 October 2002) is a Welsh professional rugby union footballer who plays as a prop forward for Cardiff Rugby.

== Early life ==
He started out playing mini rugby at Llantwit Fardre RFC and played for Pontypridd Schools, Cardiff Blues U16 North and then on to the Cardiff Blues U18 squad and the Cardiff Rugby Academy, signing a contract in 2023.

== Club career ==
He made appearances for Cardiff RFC in Super Rygbi Cymru. He made his debut for Cardiff Rugby in the United Rugby Championship in September 2022, against Munster. He made his first senior start against Perpignan in the Challenge Cup in January 2025. Following that, he started a string of matches for Cardiff in the United Rugby Championship.

== International career ==
He featured for Wales at under-20 level and played in the 2022 U20 Six Nations Championship, scoring a try against Scotland U20 in February 2022. He was brought in to train with the senior Wales side during the 2025 Six Nations Championship. He played for Wales in an uncapped game against the Barbarians in 2026, and was named in the Wales squad for the 2026 Nations Championship.

== Personal life ==
He attended Bryn Celynnog and Coleg y Cymoedd. He has a younger brother, Dylan, who also plays rugby union, for Cardiff Academy.
