= Harri Houston =

Welsh rugby union player

- Full name: Harri Blu Houston
- Born: 27 November 2003 (age 22) Wales
- Height: 178 cm (5 ft 10 in)
- Weight: 82 kg (181 lb; 12 st 13 lb)

Rugby union career
- Position: Wing
- Current team: Ospreys
Senior career
Years	Team	Apps	(Points)
2023–	Ospreys	7	(0)
- Correct as of 11 December 2025
International career
Years	Team	Apps	(Points)
2022–2023	Wales U20	16	(35)
- Correct as of 11 December 2025

Harri Houston (born 27 November 2003) is a Welsh rugby union player, who plays for the Ospreys in the United Rugby Championship. His preferred position is wing.

== Early career ==
Houston is from Wales and came through the Ospreys academy. He plays his club rugby for Loughor RFC having come through their youth system. He represented the Wales U20 side in both 2022 and 2023.

== Professional career ==
Houston made his professional debut for the Ospreys in round 7 of the 2023–24 United Rugby Championship against Benetton. He would make a further three appearances that season, earning his first start against Montpellier in December.

Houston signed an extension with the Ospreys on 2 July 2026.
