= Cameron Winnett =

Welsh rugby union player (born 2003)

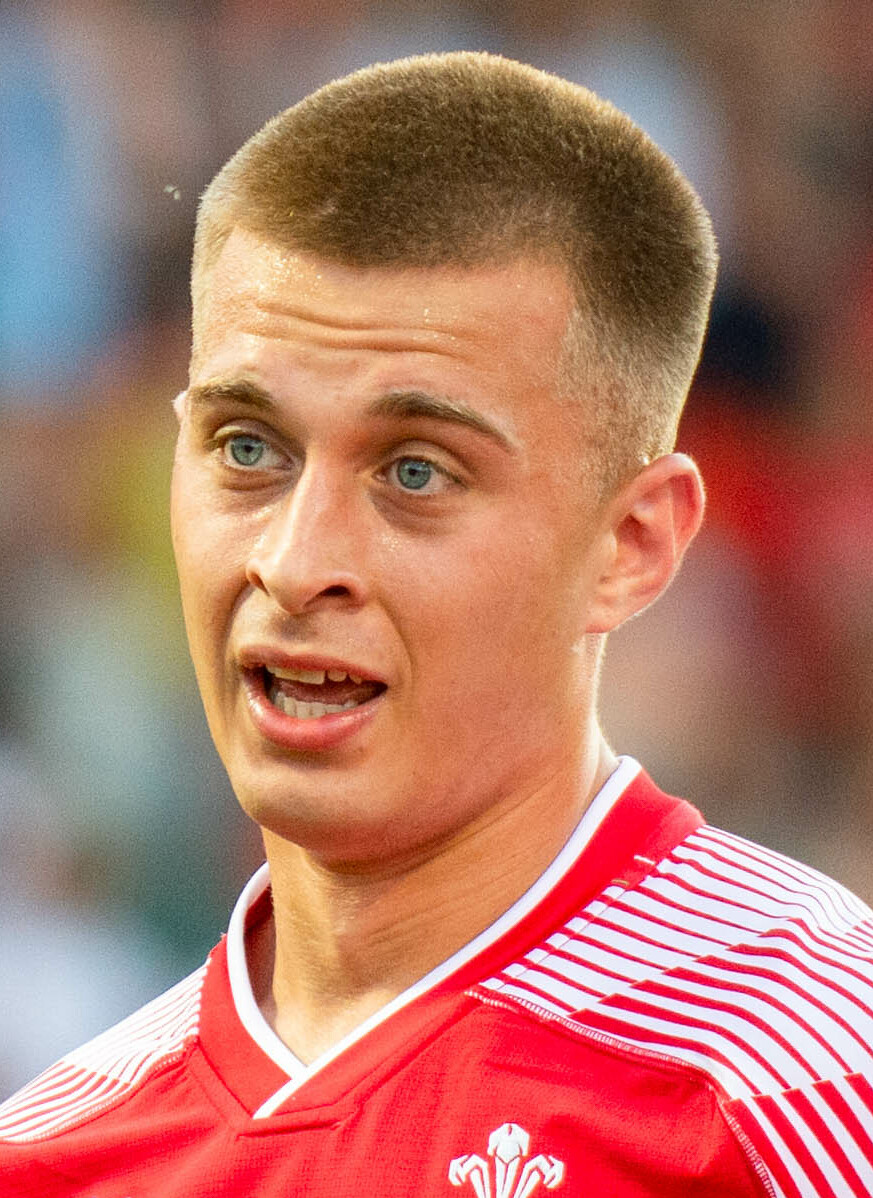
- Winnett representing Wales during the Six Nations Under 20s Championship
- Born: 7 January 2003 (age 23) Llantrisant, Wales
- Height: 1.80 m (5 ft 11 in)
- Weight: 85 kg (187 lb; 13 st 5 lb)
- School: Coleg y Cymoedd

Rugby union career
- Position: Fullback
- Current team: Cardiff Rugby
Senior career
Years	Team	Apps	(Points)
2021–	Cardiff Rugby	54	(30)
International career
Years	Team	Apps	(Points)
2022–2023	Wales U20	17	(0)
2024–	Wales	9	(0)

Cameron Winnett (born 7 January 2003) is a Welsh professional rugby union player who plays as a fullback for United Rugby Championship club Cardiff Rugby and the Wales national team.

== Early life ==
Winnett was born in Llantrisant, Wales on the 7th of January 2003.

Winnett went to school at Ysgol Gynradd Gymraeg Llwyncelyn, Porth and Ysgol Gyfun Cwm Rhondda, Porth. He later studied at Coleg Y Cymoedd.

Winnett began playing rugby with his home town club Wattstown RFC and later Treorchy RFC up until Youth whilst also representing Rhondda Schools Rugby.

He also played for Coleg Y Cymoedd whilst studying there.

== Club career ==
=== Cardiff Rugby ===
Winnett progressed through Cardiff Rugby age-grade system, as part of the academy.

Winnett featured for Cardiff RFC while part of the Cardiff academy. He made his debut for Cardiff RFC in the Welsh Premiership in October 2021.

Winnett was selected for Cardiff’s senior squad ahead of their 2021-22 European campaign. He made his senior debut at 18 years old in the second round of the 2021–22 European Rugby Champions Cup against Harlequins, starting at fullback and scoring a try.

Winnett then made his United Rugby Championship debut later that season in the final round of the 2021–22 campaign against Benetton Rugby.

Ahead of the 2023–24 United Rugby Championship season, Winnett signed a contract extension and was promoted to the first-team squad. He signed a further long-term extension on 16 January 2024.

Winnett won the URC IronMan Award for the 2024–25 season, which is presented to the player who records the most minutes across the 18 rounds of the BKT United Rugby Championship. He featured in the starting lineup for all 18 regular-season fixtures for Cardiff, missing only 13 minutes of play over the course of the campaign.

Winnett earned his 50th cap for Cardiff Rugby in a match against Dragons RFC on 26 December 2025 at Cardiff Arms Park.

== International career ==
=== Wales U20 ===
Winnett was selected by Wales U20 for the 2022 Six Nations Under 20s Championship. He made his debut against Ireland, at fullback, and featured in every match. Winnett remained in the squad for the 2022 U20 Summer Series, and started every match at fullback, as Wales made the final.

Winnett was selected again for the U20 side for the 2023 Six Nations Under 20s Championship, and once more started every match at fullback.

=== Wales ===
In 2024, he was named in the Wales national rugby union team squad for the 2024 Six Nations Championship. Winnett started at fullback against Scotland on 3 February 2024, making his international debut.

In June 2024, Winnett was named in the 36-man Wales men’s national rugby union squad for their summer tour of Australia under head coach Warren Gatland.

Winnett was named the Welsh Rugby Writers' Association Young Player of the Year following his breakthrough performance during the 2023–24 season.
