= R.C. I Medicei =

Italian rugby union club, based in Florence

(Italy) R.C. I Medicei
- Full name: Rugby Club I Medicei
- Union: Italian Rugby Federation
- Founded: 2015; 11 years ago
- Location: Florence, Italy
- Ground: Ruffino Stadium Mario Lodigiani (Capacity: 2,000)
- President: Giacomo Lucibello
- Coach: Pasquale Presutti
- League: Top12
- 2019–20: 8th

Official website
- www.imedicei.com

R.C. I Medicei is an Italian rugby union club that competed in the Top12 until 2020. They were based in Florence, in Tuscany. They were founded in 2015.

== History ==
Rugby arrived in Tuscany with university students in 1931, with a team called GUF Firenze being founded and for most of the pre-war period played in the National Division, and after the war were promoted to the then top level of Italian rugby becoming CUS Firenze, continuing to play in the upper division until 1983-84.

CUS Firenze continued as a team until 2007 when its sporting title was taken over by Firenze 1931, which retained the colours and field of the previous club and in 2010 merged with Rugby Firenze 1981.

On June 25, 2015, the foundation of the RC I Medicei was announced at a press conference held at the Padovani sports centre. The new club was born from the merger by incorporation of the ex-franchises of I Cavalieri di Prato, who only two seasons before, in the Top12 2012-13 season, had lost the final of the championship against Mogliano, but had subsequently had faced a financial crisis that led the team to end the 2014-15 tournament in last place with no wins. The I Medicei team took the Serie A sports title from which the team started under the technical guidance of Pasquale Presutti, who had previously played and coached Petrarca and Fiamme Oro and played for Italy in the 1970s.

The debut tournament of the new club, in Serie A 2015-16, saw the Medici finish second in their group in the first phase and fourth in the following promotion pool. It was in the following tournament that the team managed to improve, repeating second place in the first phase but winning its own pool promotion in front of a top-flight of the Top12 competition. Then in the semifinal the Medici defeated Verona and played L'Aquila in the final, winning in the match for the title in Parma for 38-14. They were thus promoted to the Top12, 33 years after the last presence of Florence side in the top division.

After reaching the top division and competing there for a few seasons, in 2019-2020, the COVID-19 pandemic and challenging financial difficulties hit, which led to the team withdrawing from Top12. R. C. I Medicei subsequently opted to compete in Serie A for the 2020-21 season. However, due to the continued impact of the pandemic and financial challenges, the club ceased operations and declared bankruptcy in 2021.

== Squad ==
The I Medicei squad for the 2019–20 season is:

I Medicei Top12 squad
**Props**: (Italy) Marco Battisti; (Italy) **Andrea De Marchi**; (Italy) Jacopo Schiavon; (Argentina) Emmanuel Marín Alarcón; (Italy) Clemente Zileri Dal Verme; **Hookers**: (Italy) Nicolò Broglia; (Italy) Lorenzo Giovanchelli; **Locks**: (Italy) Massimiliano Chiappini; (Italy) Matteo Maran(c); (Italy) Gabriele Signore	**Back row**: (Italy) Michele Boccardo; (Italy) Giacomo Brancoli; (Italy) Duccio Cosi; (South Africa) Carel Greeff; (Italy) Elia Venco; **Scrum-halves**: (Iran) Mohammadali Esteki; (Italy) Jean Marcelin Rorato; **Fly-halves**: (Italy) Michelangelo Bientinesi; (Italy) Rocco Del Bono; (Wales) Daniel Newton	**Centres**: (Italy) Arno Di Puccio; (Italy) Francesco Menon; (Italy) Alex Panetti; (England) Sebastian Rodwell; **Wings**: (Italy) Alessio Mattoccia; (Italy) Manuel Panetti; **Fullbacks**: (South Africa) Stefan Basson; (Italy) Giacomo Biffi; (Italy) Simone Cornelli; (Argentina) Segundo Tuculet
(c) denotes the team captain, **Bold** denotes internationally capped players.^{*} denotes players qualified to play for Italy on residency or dual nationality. Players and their allocated positions from the R.C. I Medicei website.
