= Nicolò Teneggi =

Italian rugby union player (born 2002)

- Born: 7 November 2002 (age 24) Sassuolo, Italy
- Height: 179 cm (5 ft 10 in)
- Weight: 91 kg (201 lb; 14 st 5 lb)

Rugby union career
- Position: Fly-half
- Current team: Mogliano
Youth career
- 2010−2020: Valorugby Emilia
Senior career
Years	Team	Apps	(Points)
2020–2022	Valorugby Emilia	41	(11)
2022–2024	Zebre Parma	3	(0)
2024	Rovigo Delta		
2025–	Mogliano		
- Correct as of 21 Apr 2023
International career
Years	Team	Apps	(Points)
2021–2022	Italy U20	11	(41)
- Correct as of 21 Apr 2023
National sevens team
Years	Team		Comps
2023	Italy Sevens		2
- Correct as of 30 Apr 23

Nicolò Teneggi (Italian pronunciation: [teˈneddʒi]; born 7 November 2002) is an Italian professional rugby union player who primarily plays fly-half for Mogliano of the Serie A Elite. He has also represented Italy at youth level, having previously played for clubs such as Valorugby Emilia.

== Professional career ==
Grew with Top10 team Valorugby Emilia, Teneggi signed for Zebre Parma in August 2022 ahead of the 2022–23 United Rugby Championship. He made his debut in Round 5 of the 2022–23 season against the Scarlets. He played for Zebre Parma of the United Rugby Championship until March 2024 when he signed for Rovigo Delta of the Serie A Elite.

In 2021 and 2022, Teneggi was named in Italy U20s squad for annual Six Nations Under 20s Championship. On 10 January 2023, he was named in Italy A squad for a uncapped test against Romania A.

In April 2023 he was named in Italy Sevens squad for the 2023 World Rugby Sevens Challenger Series.
