= James Culhane (rugby union) =

Irish rugby union player

- Born: 22 October 2002 (age 24) Enniskerry, County Wicklow
- Height: 1.93 m (6 ft 4 in)
- Weight: 110 kg (17 st; 240 lb)
- School: Blackrock College
- University: University College Dublin
- Notable relative: Paul Culhane (father)

Rugby union career
- Position: Back-row
Amateur team(s)
Years	Team	Apps	(Points)
- DLSP FC
- UCD RFC
Senior career
Years	Team	Apps	(Points)
2022–	Leinster	24	(20)
- Correct as of 21 March 2026
International career
Years	Team	Apps	(Points)
2022-	Ireland U20		

James Culhane (born 22 October 2002) is an Irish rugby union player who plays as a back-row for Ireland national under-20 rugby union team and Leinster Rugby.

== Early life ==
Culhane started playing rugby for De La Salle Palmerston and also played for University College Dublin R.F.C. where he studies engineering. He also represented Dublin for two years at association football in the Kennedy Cup.

== Career ==
He joined the Leinster academy ahead of the 2022–23 season. On 28 January 2023 he was included in the Leinster Rugby match day squad in the United Rugby Championship against Cardiff Rugby, and made his first-team debut coming off the bench in that game. He scored his first try for the senior team in the United Rugby Championship against Edinburgh, in a 36–27 win on 4 November 2023. On 7 May 2024, he signed his first senior contract with Leinster Rugby.

== International career ==
He was a member of the 2022 Ireland U-20 Grand Slam winning side and was named player of the tournament, and won the man of the match awards against Wales and Italy. He also represented Emerging Ireland in late 2022. In October 2025, he was called up to the Ireland Wolfhounds squad for their match against Spain during the 2025 November internationals.

== Style of play ==
His form during the Ireland U-20 grand slam winning team led to the Irish Times describing his play by saying his “carrying has been outstanding; the lines of running and footwork through contact have bamboozled physically bigger men.

== Personal life ==
Culhane is the son of Paul Culhane, a former captain of Ireland U-21s and Irish Universities. In April 2022 Culhane recovered from acute kidney failure and had to spend weeks in hospital, he said it came “from over-training and dehydration”.
