= Patrick Campbell (rugby union) =

Irish rugby union player (born 2002)

- Born: 22 July 2002 (age 24) Rochestown, Ireland
- Height: 1.78 m (5 ft 10 in)
- Weight: 88 kg (13.9 st; 194 lb)
- School: Presentation Brothers College
- University: University of Limerick

Rugby union career
- Position(s): Fullback, Wing
Amateur team(s)
Years	Team	Apps	(Points)
2021–2025	Young Munster		
Senior career
Years	Team	Apps	(Points)
2021–2025	Munster	12	(20)
2025-	Ealing Trailfinders		
- Correct as of 1 June 2026
International career
Years	Team	Apps	(Points)
2022	Ireland U20	8	(0)
- Correct as of 12 July 2022

Patrick Campbell (born 22 July 2002) is an Irish rugby union player who plays as a wing or fullback for RFU Championship club Ealing Trailfinders.

== Early life and GAA career ==
Born in Rochestown, Cork, Campbell attended Presentation Brothers College and, alongside future Munster teammate Alex Kendellen, helped the school to the final of the 2020 Munster Schools Rugby Senior Cup, which was curtailed due to the COVID-19 pandemic.

In addition to rugby, Campbell was also a Gaelic footballer for Nemo Rangers, and was part of the Cork team that won the All-Ireland Minor Football Championship in 2019, with Campbell scoring 1–2 and earning the player of the match award in the semi-final against Mayo and scoring 0–1 in the final against Galway.

After completing his leaving cert in June 2021, Campbell opted to leave Cork to study law and accounting at the University of Limerick. Additionally, Campbell chose to pursue rugby over football, and joined Young Munster ahead of the 2021–22 All-Ireland League, quickly impressing in a series of strong performances for the Limerick club.

== Munster ==
Campbell scored a hat-trick of tries for a Munster Development XV against Ulster in September 2021 and, in November of the same year, joined Munster's academy. He was registered with Munster's Champions Cup squad in December 2021 following the disruption caused by the province's recent tour to South Africa, and made his senior competitive debut for the province in their opening 2021–22 Champions Cup fixture away to English club Wasps on 12 December 2021, starting and scoring a try in the province's 35–14 win.

Campbell signed a new contract that will see him continue as an academy player for the 2022–23 season before joining Munster's senior squad on a two-year contract from the 2023–24 season. He featured off the bench in Munster's historic 28–14 win against a South Africa XV in Páirc Uí Chaoimh on 10 November 2022.

== Ireland ==
Having featured in the warm-up games against Munster and Leinster development sides, Campbell was selected in the Ireland under-20s squad for the 2022 Six Nations Under 20s Championship when it was announced in January 2022. He made his competitive debut for the under-20s in their tournament-opening 53–5 win against Wales on 4 February, though Campbell had to leave the field due to an injury during the first-half. That injury did not prevent Campbell from starting in Ireland's 17–16 away win against France one week later, the 39–12 win against Italy on 25 February, the 42–27 away win against England on 12 March, and the 59–5 home win against Scotland on 20 March that secured a Grand Slam for Ireland.

Campbell was initially ruled out of the Under-20s Summer Series due to a thumb injury and was not selected in Ireland' squad, however, he recovered faster than anticipated and only missed the opening fixture against France, returning to start against South Africa on 29 June 2022 and played the full 80 minutes in Ireland's 33–24 defeat, before also starting in the 37–36 win against England on 5 July and the 41–24 win against Scotland on 12 July in Ireland's final match of the series.

== Honours ==
=== Cork GAA ===
- All-Ireland Minor Football Championship:
  - Winner (1): 2019

=== Munster ===
- United Rugby Championship
  - Winner (1): 2022–23

=== Ireland under-20s ===
- Six Nations Under 20s Championship:
  - Winner (1): 2022
- Grand Slam:
  - Winner (1): 2022
- Triple Crown:
  - Winner (1): 2022
