= Giacomo Ferrari (rugby union) =

Italian rugby union player

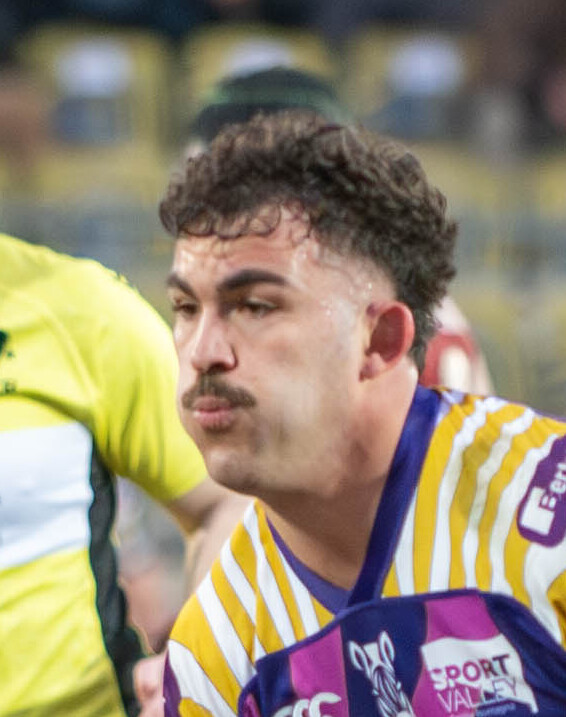
- Ferrari in 2025
- Born: 22 January 2002 (age 24) Rome, Italy
- Height: 1.90 m (6 ft 3 in)
- Weight: 105 kg (231 lb; 16 st 7 lb)

Rugby union career
- Position: Flanker
- Current team: Zebre Parma
Youth career
- Capitolina Roma
- 2020−2022: F.I.R. Academy
Senior career
Years	Team	Apps	(Points)
2022−	Zebre Parma	56	(10)
- Correct as of 9 Aug 2026
International career
Years	Team	Apps	(Points)
2020–2022	Italy U20s	10	(10)
2026	Italy XV	2	(0)
- Correct as of 2 Nov 2022

Giacomo Ferrari (born 22 January 2002) is an Italian rugby union player, currently playing for Italian United Rugby Championship side Zebre. His preferred position is flanker.

Ferrari signed for Zebre Parma in May 2022 ahead of the 2022–23 United Rugby Championship as Academy Player. He made his debut in Round 7 of the 2022–23 season against the Dragons.

In February 2024, he signed a 4 year contract with Zebre senior squad.

In 2021 and 2022, Ferrari was named in Italy U20s squad for annual Six Nations Under 20s Championship. On 10 January 2023, he was named in Italy A squad for a uncapped test against Romania A. On 28 January 2026 he was selected by Massimo Brunello to be part of an Italy XV squad for two official tests against Scotland A and Chile during 2026 men's rugby union internationals window of spring.
