= Ben Brownlee =

Irish rugby union player (born 2002)

- Born: 28 September 2002 (age 24)
- Height: 1.88 m (6 ft 2 in)
- Weight: 100 kg (16 st; 220 lb)
- School: Blackrock College
- University: University College Dublin
- Notable relative(s): Allan Brownlee (father), Ronnie Dawson (great-uncle)

Rugby union career
- Position: Centre
Amateur team(s)
Years	Team	Apps	(Points)
- Wanderers FC
- UCD R.F.C.
Senior career
Years	Team	Apps	(Points)
2022–2025	Leinster	10	
2025-	North Harbour	8	
- Correct as of 30 July 2025
International career
Years	Team	Apps	(Points)
2022-	Ireland U20	3	

Ben Brownlee (born 28 September 2002) is an Irish rugby union player who last played as a Centre for Leinster Rugby and Ireland U20. In July 2025 he signed with New Zealand provincial side North Harbour.

== Early life ==
Brownlee came through Wanderers FC before attending Blackrock College and UCD to study Business and Law.

== Career ==
He joined the Leinster academy ahead of the 2022–23 season. He was selected for his first team league debut in October 2022 in the United Rugby Championship against Scarlets. He was awarded his first league start for Leinster in January 2023 against Cardiff Rugby. In 2025 he was released by Leinster, signing for New Zealand NPC side North Harbour.

== International career ==
He was a member of the Ireland U-20 2022 Grand Slam winning team. His performances included a last-minute try against France U20 which helped Ireland to a 17–16 win in February 2022.

== Personal life ==
His father Allan played age group rugby with London Irish. His great-uncle Ronnie Dawson was a rugby player and administrator who captained Leinster, Ireland, and the British & Irish Lions.
