= Bryn Bradley =

Welsh rugby player (born 2003)

Brynmor Bradley
- Born: 17 April 2003 (age 23) London, England
- Height: 192 cm (6 ft 4 in)
- Weight: 106 kg (234 lb)
- School: Epsom College
- Notable relative: Gwilym Bradley (brother)

Rugby union career
- Position: Centre
- Current team: Harlequins
Senior career
Years	Team	Apps	(Points)
2022–	Harlequins	31	(35)
2022–2024	→ London Scottish (loan)	24	(40)
International career
Years	Team	Apps	(Points)
2022–2023	Wales U20	14	(5)

Bryn Bradley (born 17 April 2003) is a Welsh rugby union player who plays as a centre for Rugby Premiership side Harlequins.

== Early life ==
He attended Epsom College and played for Cobham RFC prior to joining the rugby academy at Harlequins. His older brother Gwilym plays rugby for Cardiff.

== Career ==
In 2022, he moved into the Harlequins senior academy. That autumn, he began play on loan at Rugby Championship side London Scottish.

He continued to play on loan for London Scottish throughout the 2023-2024 season. That season, he also made his debut for Harlequins in the Rugby Premiership, making appearances off the bench against Bristol Bears and Newcastle Falcons.

== International career ==
Although he was born in London, Bradley is Welsh-qualified through his mother who is from Newport, Wales, and played for Wales U20. He was a try scorer for Wales at the 2023 World Rugby U20 Championship. He also played international rugby league for the Wales U18 side whilst playing junior rugby league for Elmbridge Eagles.

In May 2026, he was called-up to the senior Wales squad for the summer internationals by head coach Steve Tandy.
