= Gwilym Bradley =

Welsh rugby union player

- Born: 10 September 2000 (age 26) Kingston upon Thames, England
- Height: 1.86 m (6 ft 1 in)
- Weight: 98 kg (216 lb; 15 st 6 lb)
- University: University of Bath
- Notable relative: Bryn Bradley (brother)

Rugby union career
- Position: Flanker
Youth career
- Cobham RFC
Senior career
| Years | Team | Apps | (Points) |
| 2020–2025 | Cardiff Rugby | 13 | (5) |
- Correct as of 22 May 2025
International career
| Years | Team | Apps | (Points) |
| 2020 | Wales U20s | 3 | (0) |
- Correct as of 23 January 2023

Gwilym Bradley (born 10 September 2000) is a Welsh rugby union player who most recently played for Cardiff Rugby as a flanker.

== Professional career ==
Born in Kingston upon Thames, Bradley played youth rugby for Cobham RFC before joining the London Irish academy. After leaving the academy, Bradley enrolled at University of Bath, pursuing a degree in Economics. While attending Bath, he played for their rugby club in the BUCS Super Rugby tournament.

A member of the Welsh Exiles programme, Bradley played for Wales U19 and U20.

Bradley is a member of the Cardiff academy. He made his Cardiff debut in Round 7 of the 2020–21 Pro14 against Leinster.

During the 2022–23 United Rugby Championship season, Bradley underwent foot surgery, ruling him out for the majority of the season.

Bradley signed an extension with Cardiff on 26 July 2023.

In 2024, he suffered a serious shoulder injury while playing for Cardiff RFC and missed the remainder of the season. Bradley departed Cardiff at the end of the 2024-25 United Rugby Championship season.

== Personal life ==
Bradley grew up in south west London. He qualifies for Wales through his Newport-born mother, supporting Wales throughout his childhood. Bradley’s younger brother Bryn has also represented Wales U20, and is a member of the Harlequins academy.
