= Fionn Gibbons =

Irish rugby union player

- Born: 12 June 2002 (age 24) Ireland
- Height: 1.93 m (6 ft 4 in)
- Weight: 100 kg (16 st; 220 lb)
- School: Castleknock College

Rugby union career
- Position(s): Centre, Wing
Amateur team(s)
Years	Team	Apps	(Points)
- UCD
- Young Munster
Senior career
Years	Team	Apps	(Points)
2022–	Munster	4	(0)
- Correct as of 1 November 2025
International career
Years	Team	Apps	(Points)
2022	Ireland U20	8	(30)
- Correct as of 12 July 2022

Fionn Gibbons (born 12 June 2002) is an Irish rugby union player who plays as a centre for United Rugby Championship club Munster.

== Munster ==
Gibbons joined year one of Munster's academy ahead of the 2022–23 season, and made his senior competitive debut for the province in their 2022–23 United Rugby Championship round four fixture against rivals Connacht on 7 October 2022, coming on as a 67th minute replacement for Ben Healy in Munster's 20–11 away defeat.

== Ireland ==
Gibbons was a grand slam winner with Ireland under-20s in 2022, starting four of the five matches and scoring three tries, before also starting four matches and scoring three tries for the under-20s during the U20 Summer Series in the same year.

== Honours ==
=== Munster ===
- United Rugby Championship
  - Winner (1): 2022–23

=== Ireland under-20s ===
- Six Nations Under 20s Championship:
  - Winner (1): 2022
- Grand Slam:
  - Winner (1): 2022
- Triple Crown:
  - Winner (1): 2022
