= Harri Millard =

Welsh rugby union footballer (born 1996)

- Born: Harri Millard; 17 August 1996 (age 30) Pontypridd, Wales
- Height: 180 cm (5 ft 11 in)
- Weight: 94 kg (14 st 11 lb)

Rugby union career
- Position(s): Outside Centre; Wing
- Current team: Cardiff Rugby
Youth career
- Mountain Ash
Senior career
Years	Team	Apps	(Points)
2016-	Cardiff Rugby	35	(40)
- Correct as of 08 June 2022
International career
Years	Team	Apps	(Points)
- Wales U20

Harri Millard (born 17 August 1996) is a Welsh rugby union player who plays for Cardiff Rugby as a centre. He is a Wales under-20 international. Harri played his Mini and a junior rugby at Mountain Ash RFC.

Millard made his debut for Cardiff in 2016 having previously played for the team's academy.
