= Gabriel Hamer-Webb =

Welsh rugby union player

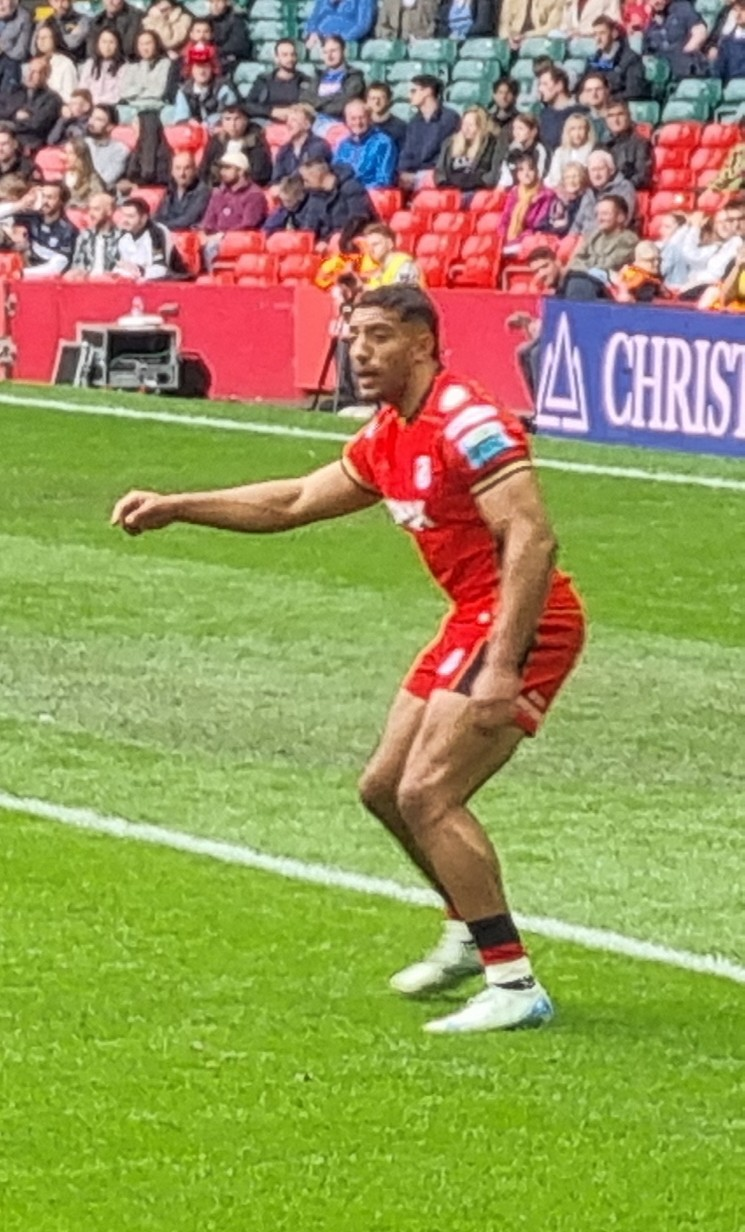
- Judgement Day 2025
- Born: Gabriel Morgan Hamer-Webb; 7 November 2000 (age 26) Bath, England
- Height: 1.83 m (6 ft 0 in)
- Weight: 95 kg (209 lb; 14 st 13 lb)
- School: Beechen Cliff

Rugby union career
- Position: Wing
- Current team: Leicester Tigers
Senior career
| Years | Team | Apps | (Points) |
| 2019–2023 | Bath | 34 | (20) |
| 2023 | Hartpury University | 1 | (0) |
| 2024 | Northampton Saints | 1 | (0) |
| 2023–2025 | Cardiff Rugby | 24 | (60) |
| 2025– | Leicester Tigers | 22 | (65) |
- Correct as of 1 November 2026
Provincial / State sides
| Years | Team | Apps | (Points) |
| 2023 | Southland | 8 | (10) |
International career
| Years | Team | Apps | (Points) |
| 2020 | England U20 | 2 | (0) |
| 2026– | Wales | 2 | (0) |
- Correct as of 18 November 2026

Gabriel Morgan Hamer-Webb (born 7 November 2000 in Bath, England) is a professional rugby union player for Leicester Tigers in Premiership Rugby and Wales national team. His preferred position is wing. He has previously played for Bath and Northampton Saints in Premiership Rugby, for Southland in New Zealand's NPC and for Cardiff Rugby in the URC.

== Early life ==
Hamer-Webb was a pupil at Beechen Cliff School and had trials at Southampton, Bristol City and Yeovil Town football clubs before taking up a place on the school's Academic and Sporting Excellence (AASE) partnership with Bath Rugby.

== Club career ==
=== Bath ===
He signed a senior academy contract with the club ahead of the 2019-20 season, and he made his debut in a Premiership Rugby Cup defeat against Exeter Chiefs on 21 September 2019. He made his Premiership debut as a head injury replacement for Max Wright against Wasps on 2 November 2019, before scoring his first try for the club against Ulster in the European Rugby Champions Cup two weeks later. He was released at the end of the 2022–23 Premiership Rugby season.

=== Southland ===
After his departure from Bath, he joined Southland in the NPC.

=== Cardiff ===
Hamer-Webb signed with Cardiff on 7 November 2023, as a short-term injury loan. In January 2024, he then joined Northampton on a short-term contract, before returning to Cardiff on a permanent deal in February. He scored a hat-trick against Ospreys in the 2025 Judgement Day fixture.

=== Leicester ===
In June 2025 he signed for Leicester Tigers. His club debut came in August against Saracens. Hamer-Webb signed an extension with the club in December 2025.

On 18 April 2026, Hamer-Webb scored five tries in a 62-3 win against Newcastle Red Bulls. The match was the 5,000th played by Leicester, and Hamer-Webb became the first Tigers player to score five tries in a competitive match and the first since Will Greenwood in 1996 against Cambridge University to score five in any match.

== International career ==
=== England U20 ===
On 10 January 2020, Alan Dickens named Hamer-Webb in his 32-man England squad for the 2020 Six Nations Under 20s Championship. He made his debut in the opening game against France, in which he was sin binned for a tip tackle on Nolann Le Garrec.

=== Wales ===
On 20 January 2026, he was named in Steve Tandy's Welsh squad for the 2026 Six Nations Championship. He went on to make his international debut on 21 February 2026, starting on the wing and earning his first cap in Wales’ Six Nations narrow 23-26 loss against Scotland.

On 14 November 2026, he earned his second international cap in Wales’ 35–28 victory over New Zealand in the Nations Championship at the Principality Stadium. The victory marked Wales’ first win over New Zealand since 1953, ending a run of 34 consecutive defeats against the All Blacks.
