= Jude Postlethwaite =

Irish rugby union player

- Born: 3 April 2002 (age 24)
- Height: 1.93 m (6 ft 4 in)
- Weight: 105 kg (16.5 st; 231 lb)
- School: Royal Belfast Academical Institution

Rugby union career
- Position: Centre
Amateur team(s)
Years	Team	Apps	(Points)
2022-2023	Banbridge	2	(0)
2023-2024	City of Armagh	5	(0)
Senior career
Years	Team	Apps	(Points)
2023–	Ulster	47	(30)
- Correct as of 22 May 2026
International career
Years	Team	Apps	(Points)
2021–	Ireland Sevens		
2021-22	Ireland U20	7	(5)
2024	Emerging Ireland	2	(4)
2025	Ireland A	2	(0)
- Correct as of 8 November 2025

Jude Postlethwaite (born 3 April 2002) is an Irish rugby union player, currently playing for United Rugby Championship and European Rugby Champions Cup side Ulster. His preferred position is centre.

He played rugby at RBAI, under future Ulster assistant coach Dan Soper, was top scorer in the 2020 Ulster Schools' Cup, and represented Ulster Schools. After leaving school, he joined Ulster's academy. During his time in the academy, he represented the Ireland national rugby sevens team in the World Rugby Sevens Series. He debuted for the national sevens team in 2021. He also represented Ireland U20 in the 2022 Six Nations Under 20s Championship.

In February 2022 he signed a development contract with Ulster, to be upgraded to a full senior contract after a year. He made his debut for Ulster from the bench in the United Rugby Championship against Cardiff in March 2023.
