= Charlie Tector =

Irish rugby union player

- Born: 28 March 2002 (age 24) Wexford, Ireland
- Height: 1.88 m (6 ft 2 in)
- Weight: 94 kg (14.8 st; 207 lb)
- School: Kilkenny College
- Notable relative: Harry Tector (cousin)

Rugby union career
- Position: Fly-half
Senior career
Years	Team	Apps	(Points)
2022–	Leinster	26	(42)
- Correct as of 28 February 2026
International career
Years	Team	Apps	(Points)
2021–	Ireland U20s	5	(53)
- Correct as of 06 April 2023

Charlie Tector (born 28 March 2002) is an Irish rugby union player, currently playing for United Rugby Championship and European Rugby Champions Cup side Leinster. His preferred position is Fly-half.

== Leinster ==
Tector was named in the Leinster Rugby academy for the 2022–23 season. He made his debut in Round 7 of the 2022–23 United Rugby Championship against the Scarlets.

== Personal life ==
He is the cousin of cricketer Harry Tector.
