= Joe Cowell =

Welsh rugby union player

- Born: 6 January 2002 (age 24) Wales
- Height: 1.88 m (6 ft 2 in)
- Weight: 121 kg (19.1 st; 267 lb)
- University: Cardiff Metropolitan University

Rugby union career
- Position: Loosehead Prop
Senior career
Years	Team	Apps	(Points)
2021	Cardiff	1	(0)
- Correct as of 11 December 2021

Joe Cowell (born 6 January 2002) is a Welsh rugby union player, currently playing loosehead prop for United Rugby Championship side Cardiff.

== Cardiff ==
Cowell was called into Cardiff's European squad ahead of their European campaign. He made his debut for Cardiff in the first round of the 2021–22 European Rugby Champions Cup against Toulouse coming on as a replacement.

During the 2025–26 season, Cowell joined Bedford Blues on short-term loan.
