= Ennis RFC =

Irish rugby union club in County Clare, Ireland

Ennis RFC, or Ennis Rugby Football Club, in an amateur rugby union club based on the Drumbiggle Road in Ennis, County Clare adjacent to the Ennis Showgrounds which has a ground capacity of up to 1,000. The club often use the Clare County Council community facility at Lee's Road for training. The club currently plays in the Munster Junior League division 2.

== History ==
The club was formed in 1923. Players were primarily drawn from among the business community in the town. Many were also involved in the Past Pupils Union of St. Flannan's College. At the beginning of The Emergency (WWII), the club temporarily disbanded and did not reform until 1952. The Gaelic Athletic Association ban on their members playing any 'garrison games' discouraged people playing rugby if they also played hurling or Gaelic football. This affected the player base available to the club. An underage section was formed in 1973.

In 1979 the club finally built a clubhouse after purchasing land from the Showgrounds. The clubhouse is still in place today, having had a gym added subsequently.

As of 2008, the club fielded teams at various levels: Senior, Senior 2nds, U-19's, U-17's, U-15's, U-14's, U-13's, U-12's, U-11's, U-10's, U-9's, U-8's.

The club had several successes with underage players selected for Munster and Ireland at a number of age levels in the early 2000s.

== Honours ==
- 1928 Daresbury Cup
- 1932 Garryowen Cup
- 1976/77 The Kenny Shield
- 1977/78 Banner Shield
- 1978/79 Limerick City Cup
- 2006 Liam Fitzgerald Cup
