= 2026–27 United Rugby Championship =

Rugby competition

- Countries: Ireland; Italy; Scotland; South Africa; Wales
- Date: 19 September 2026 – 19 June 2027
- Matches played: 40
- Attendance: 397,202 (average 9,930 per match)
- Highest attendance: 42,368 - Stormers v Sharks, Oct 10
- Lowest attendance: 2,305 - Zebre v Edinburgh, Oct 10
- Tries scored: 303 (average 7.6 per match)
- Top point scorer: (England) James Grayson (34)
- Top try scorer: (Wales) Elliot Dee (5)

Official website
- unitedrugby.com

The 2026–27 United Rugby Championship is the 26th season of the professional rugby union competition currently known as the United Rugby Championship, the highest level domestic club rugby competition in South Africa, Ireland, Scotland, Wales and Italy. This season is the sixth season under that name, and the sixth with the current collection of teams. It began on 19 September 2026 and will end on 19 June 2027.

Leinster enter the competition as the two-time reigning champions. Leinster, Glasgow Warriors, Lions and Ospreys are defending the Irish, Scottish-Italian, South African and Welsh Shields respectively.

== Format ==
The 2026–27 season once again consists of 21 rounds: 18 rounds of regular season play, followed by three rounds of play-offs. The competition runs from September 2026 to June 2027, with the regular season ending in mid May. The season also contains breaks for the 2026 Nations Championship, the 2027 Six Nations (though some matches are played during 'fallow' weekends) and the various matchdays of the 2026–27 European Rugby Champions Cup and Challenge Cup. The season does not overlap with the mid year series in the 2026 Nations Championship. Some South African teams will play derby matches throughout the Men's Six Nations window, as this is a competition in which the South Africa national team are not involved.

There are four regional pools: The Irish Shield pool (featuring the four Irish teams), the Welsh Shield pool (featuring the four Welsh teams), the South African Shield pool (featuring the four South African teams) and the shared Italian-Scottish Shield pool (featuring the two Italian and two Scottish sides). The pools serve two functions; they guarantee a full slate of home-and-away derby matches for each team (which are often the best attended and most remunerative fixtures for the clubs involved), and they award a minor Regional Shield trophy to the top team in each pool, which thereby functions as a de facto national professional championship in three of the four pools, and a cross-border regional championship in the Scottish–Italian pool. The winner of each Shield will be determined solely from the games played amongst the teams within their regional pool, mirroring the format of the old Interprovincial Championship in Ireland.

In Scotland, the two pool games involving both Scottish sides also decide the 1872 Cup, effectively a Scottish national professional championship. The two Italian sides have no individual trophy to play for.

Teams therefore play six matches against their regional pool rivals, in a home and away double round-robin. The remaining 12 matches are made up by a single round robin of the remaining teams, consisting of an even number of six home and six away matches against all the sides from the other pools, with home advantage alternating each year. Generally each team will play two of the teams in each of the other pools at home, and two away, with the matches away to South African teams usually held back to back as a 'mini-tour' to reduce travel. The South African teams in turn have six European matches, which are arranged as a series of three 'mini-tours' of two matches to reduce air travel.

For the United Rugby Championship itself, there is one main league table. The top eight sides in that table at the end of the regular season will qualify for the play-off quarter-finals, followed by semi-finals and a grand final. The playoffs are seeded, with the top four seeds having home advantage at the quarter-final stage. In the semi-finals and final, the better ranked club in each tie has home advantage, so the number one team in the ladder will retain home advantage for as long as it progresses in the competition, including the final (unlike the Prem Rugby competition in England where the final is held in the neutral Twickenham Stadium).

The Regional Shield pools have no direct link to the play-offs and by extension the Championship itself, or European qualification, and it is technically possible to win a Regional Shield but not contest the play-offs.

== Teams ==
| Team | Country | Coach / Director of Rugby | Captain | Stadium | Capacity | Position last season |
|---|---|---|---|---|---|---|
| Benetton | Italy | (New Zealand) Wayne Pivac | (Italy) Michele Lamaro | Stadio Comunale di Monigo | 5,000 | 13th |
| Bulls | South Africa | (South Africa) Johan Ackermann | (South Africa) Marcell Coetzee | Loftus Versfeld Stadium | 51,762 | 4th, Runner-up |
| Cardiff | Wales | (South Africa) Corniel van Zyl | (Wales) Liam Belcher | Cardiff Arms Park | 12,125 | 6th, play-off quarter-final |
| Connacht | Ireland | (England) Stuart Lancaster | (Ireland) Cian Prendergast | The Sportsground | 10,500 | 8th, play-off quarter-final |
| Dragons | Wales | (New Zealand) Filo Tiatia | (Wales) Ben Carter (Wales) Angus O'Brien | Rodney Parade | 8,700 | 15th |
| Edinburgh | Scotland | (South Africa) Sean Everitt | (Scotland) Magnus Bradbury | Edinburgh Rugby Stadium; Murrayfield Stadium | 7,800; 67,144 | 12th |
| Glasgow Warriors | Scotland | (South Africa) Franco Smith | (Scotland) Kyle Steyn | Scotstoun Stadium; Hampden Park | 7,351; 51,866 | 1st, play-off semi-final |
| Leinster | Ireland | (Ireland) Leo Cullen | (Ireland) Caelan Doris | RDS Arena | 20,600 | 2nd, Champion (10th title) |
| Lions | South Africa | (South Africa) Ivan van Rooyen | (South Africa) Francke Horn | Ellis Park Stadium | 62,567 | 7th, play-off quarter-final |
| Munster | Ireland | (New Zealand) Clayton McMillan | (Ireland) Tadhg Beirne | Thomond Park; Musgrave Park | 25,600; 8,008 | 5th, play-off quarter-final |
| Ospreys | Wales | (Wales) Mark Jones | (Wales) Sam Parry (Wales) Owen Watkin | St Helen's | 8,000 | 11th |
| Scarlets | Wales | (Wales) Dwayne Peel | (Wales) Josh Macleod | Parc y Scarlets | 14,870 | 14th |
| Sharks | South Africa | (New Zealand) JP Pietersen | (South Africa) André Esterhuizen | Kings Park Stadium | 52,000 | 10th |
| Stormers | South Africa | (South Africa) John Dobson | (South Africa) Ruhan Nel | Cape Town Stadium; Danie Craven Stadium | 55,000; 16,000 | 3rd, play-off semi-final |
| Ulster | Ireland | (Ireland) Richie Murphy | (Ireland) Iain Henderson | Ravenhill Stadium | 18,196 | 9th |
| Zebre | Italy | (Italy) Massimo Brunello | (Italy) Alessandro Fusco | Stadio Sergio Lanfranchi | 5,000 | 16th |

| Location of Irish, Scottish and Welsh teams: 2026–27 United Rugby Championship (the United Kingdom and Ireland) | Location of Italian teams: 2026–27 United Rugby Championship (Northern Italy) Location of South African teams: 2026–27 United Rugby Championship (South Africa) |

== URC league standings ==
| Pos | Team | Pld | W | D | L | PF | PA | PD | TF | TA | TB | LB | Pts | Qualification |
|---|---|---|---|---|---|---|---|---|---|---|---|---|---|---|
| 1 | Glasgow Warriors | 5 | 4 | 1 | 0 | 148 | 112 | +36 | 22 | 15 | 5 | 0 | 23 | Qualification for the Champions Cup and knockout stage |
| 2 | Bulls | 5 | 4 | 0 | 1 | 214 | 106 | +108 | 31 | 15 | 4 | 1 | 21 | Qualification for the Champions Cup and knockout stage |
| 3 | Stormers | 5 | 4 | 0 | 1 | 166 | 101 | +65 | 24 | 14 | 4 | 1 | 21 | Qualification for the Champions Cup and knockout stage |
| 4 | Sharks | 5 | 4 | 0 | 1 | 140 | 107 | +33 | 20 | 16 | 3 | 0 | 19 | Qualification for the Champions Cup and knockout stage |
| 5 | Edinburgh | 5 | 4 | 0 | 1 | 123 | 95 | +28 | 17 | 12 | 3 | 0 | 19 | Qualification for the Champions Cup and knockout stage |
| 6 | Leinster | 5 | 3 | 0 | 2 | 149 | 81 | +68 | 23 | 11 | 4 | 2 | 18 | Qualification for the Champions Cup and knockout stage |
| 7 | Cardiff | 5 | 3 | 0 | 2 | 113 | 107 | +6 | 17 | 17 | 2 | 0 | 14 | Qualification for the Champions Cup and knockout stage |
| 8 | Dragons | 5 | 2 | 1 | 2 | 137 | 128 | +9 | 20 | 20 | 3 | 1 | 14 | Qualification for the Champions Cup and knockout stage |
| 9 | Ospreys | 5 | 2 | 0 | 3 | 112 | 147 | −35 | 18 | 21 | 3 | 0 | 11 | Qualification for the Challenge Cup |
| 10 | Benetton | 5 | 1 | 1 | 3 | 115 | 104 | +11 | 16 | 17 | 2 | 3 | 11 | Qualification for the Challenge Cup |
| 11 | Connacht | 5 | 2 | 0 | 3 | 109 | 161 | −52 | 18 | 24 | 2 | 0 | 10 | Qualification for the Challenge Cup |
| 12 | Munster | 5 | 1 | 1 | 3 | 93 | 113 | −20 | 12 | 17 | 2 | 2 | 10 | Qualification for the Challenge Cup |
| 13 | Lions | 5 | 2 | 0 | 3 | 107 | 162 | −55 | 15 | 25 | 1 | 0 | 9 | Qualification for the Challenge Cup |
| 14 | Scarlets | 5 | 1 | 0 | 4 | 134 | 191 | −57 | 20 | 29 | 4 | 1 | 9 | Qualification for the Challenge Cup |
| 15 | Ulster | 5 | 0 | 2 | 3 | 121 | 160 | −39 | 18 | 22 | 4 | 1 | 9 | Qualification for the Challenge Cup |
| 16 | Zebre | 5 | 0 | 0 | 5 | 93 | 199 | −106 | 14 | 30 | 2 | 0 | 2 | Qualification for the Challenge Cup |

Updated to match(es) played on 2nd November 2026. Source: UnitedRugby.com
Rules for classification: Tiebreakers for teams tied on points: 1) Number of matches won 2) The difference between points for and points against 3) The number of tries scored 4) The most points scored 5) The difference between tries for and tries against 6) The fewest red cards received 7) The fewest yellow cards received.

== Regional shields ==
Regional shield standings are based entirely on performances against other teams within the same conference. Therefore, only six games for each team count towards the regional shields. Leinster, Glasgow Warriors, Lions and Ospreys entered their respective Regional Shield competitions as reigning champions.

2026–27 United Rugby Championship Regional Shield tables
(Ireland) Irish Shield
| | Team | P | W | D | L | PF | PA | PD | TF | TA | TBP | LBP | Pts | Pos overall |
| 1 | (Ireland) Leinster | 2 | 2 | 0 | 0 | 74 | 23 | +51 | 11 | 3 | 2 | 0 | 10 | 6 |
| 2 | (Ireland) Munster | 2 | 0 | 1 | 1 | 44 | 50 | –6 | 6 | 8 | 1 | 1 | 4 | 12 |
| 3 | (Ireland) Ulster | 1 | 0 | 1 | 0 | 26 | 26 | 0 | 4 | 4 | 1 | 0 | 3 | 15 |
| 4 | (Ireland) Connacht | 1 | 0 | 0 | 1 | 5 | 50 | –45 | 1 | 7 | 0 | 0 | 0 | 11 |
(Italy) (Scotland) Italian x Scottish Shield
| | Team | P | W | D | L | PF | PA | PD | TF | TA | TBP | LBP | Pts | Pos overall |
| 1 | (Italy) Benetton | 2 | 1 | 0 | 1 | 51 | 36 | +15 | 6 | 6 | 1 | 1 | 6 | 10 |
| 2 | (Scotland) Glasgow Warriors | 1 | 1 | 0 | 0 | 24 | 20 | +4 | 4 | 2 | 1 | 0 | 5 | 1 |
| 3 | (Scotland) Edinburgh | 2 | 1 | 0 | 1 | 41 | 43 | –2 | 6 | 6 | 1 | 0 | 5 | 5 |
| 4 | (Italy) Zebre Parma | 1 | 0 | 0 | 1 | 12 | 29 | –17 | 2 | 4 | 0 | 0 | 0 | 16 |
(South Africa) South African Shield
| | Team | P | W | D | L | PF | PA | PD | TF | TA | TBP | LBP | Pts | Pos overall |
| 1 | (South Africa) Bulls | 1 | 1 | 0 | 0 | 57 | 15 | +42 | 9 | 2 | 1 | 0 | 5 | 2 |
| 2 | (South Africa) Stormers | 1 | 1 | 0 | 0 | 39 | 22 | +17 | 6 | 3 | 1 | 0 | 5 | 3 |
| 3 | (South Africa) Sharks | 1 | 0 | 0 | 1 | 22 | 39 | –17 | 3 | 6 | 0 | 0 | 0 | 4 |
| 4 | (South Africa) Lions | 1 | 0 | 0 | 1 | 15 | 57 | –42 | 2 | 9 | 0 | 0 | 0 | 13 |
(Wales) Welsh Shield
| | Team | P | W | D | L | PF | PA | PD | TF | TA | TBP | LBP | Pts | Pos overall |
| 1 | (Wales) Ospreys | 3 | 2 | 0 | 1 | 69 | 71 | –2 | 11 | 10 | 2 | 0 | 10 | 9 |
| 2 | (Wales) Cardiff | 2 | 2 | 0 | 0 | 47 | 15 | +32 | 7 | 2 | 1 | 0 | 9 | 7 |
| 3 | (Wales) Dragons | 3 | 1 | 0 | 2 | 83 | 95 | –12 | 12 | 15 | 2 | 1 | 7 | 8 |
| 4 | (Wales) Scarlets | 2 | 0 | 0 | 2 | 41 | 59 | –18 | 6 | 9 | 1 | 1 | 2 | 14 |
If teams are level at any stage, tiebreakers are applied in the following order: 1. number of matches won 2. the difference between points for and points against 3. the number of tries scored 4. the most points scored 5. the difference between tries for and tries against 6. the fewest red cards received 7. the fewest yellow cards received
Green background indicates teams currently leading the regional shield. Upon the conclusion of the regular season, these teams win their respective regional shields. (S) : URC Shield champion

== European qualification ==
Priority order for 2027–28 European Rugby Champions Cup qualification is as follows:

- 2026–27 United Rugby Championship champions
- the 2026–27 European Rugby Champions Cup champions (if a URC team but not already qualified as above)
- the 2026–27 EPCR Challenge Cup champions (if a URC team but not already qualified as above)
- the next highest-ranked teams during regular season play not already qualified as above, until eight overall qualifiers have been selected.

As a result of the priority order, the top five teams in the regular season standings are guaranteed qualification to the Champions Cup, with the remaining three places dependant on cup results this season.

The eight remaining teams qualify for the 2026–27 EPCR Challenge Cup.

== Regular season ==
The matches for the regular season were announced on 19 May 2026. This season begins with a triple-header on Friday 25 September 2026, as Dragons visit Benetton, Connacht host Stormers and Ulster entertain Edinburgh, all matches beginning at 19:45. The remaining ten teams will begin their season the following day.

=== Round 1 ===
| 25 September | Benetton (Italy) | 19–19 | (Wales) Dragons | Stadio Monigo, Treviso |
| | Try: Mey 12' c Bernasconi 24' c Mendy 40' m Con: Umaga (2/3) 13', 25' | Report; Scorecard; Highlights | Try: de Beer 27' c Inisi 44' c Dee 78' m Con: de Beer (2/3) 28', 45' | Attendance: 4,217; Referee: Christopher Allison (South Africa) |

| 25 September | Connacht (Ireland) | 15–29 | (South Africa) Stormers (1 BP) | The Sportsground, Galway |
| | Try: Hansen 38' c Ioane 42' m Con: Gilbert (1/2) 39'; Pen: Gilbert 52'; Cards: Boyle (yellow card) 54' | Report; Scorecard; Highlights | Try: Gelant 20' c Sandi 57' c Paulo 78' m Ngobeni 80' c Con: Matthee (2/2) 21', 58'; Ahmed (1/2) 81'; Pen: Matthee 9' | Attendance: 7,243; Referee: Sam Grove-White (Scotland) |

| 25 September | (2 BP) Ulster (Ireland) | 29–34 | (Scotland) Edinburgh (1 BP) | Ravenhill Stadium, Belfast |
| | Try: Lowry 26' m Z Ward 57' c McCann 61' c Knox 64' c Con: Murphy (3/4) 58', 62', 65'; Pen: Murphy 75' | Report; Scorecard; Highlights | Try: Douglas 20' c Satala 39' c H Patterson 42' c O'Conor 48' c Con: Grayson (4/4) 21', 40', 43', 49'; Pen: Grayson (2) 24', 28' | Attendance: 11,705; Referee: Federico Vedovelli (Italy) |

| 26 September | Lions (South Africa) | 27–26 | (Ireland) Leinster (2 BP) | Ellis Park Stadium, Jo'burg |
| | Try: Cronjé (2) 9' c, 24' c Mpeku 79' c Con: Smith (3/3) 9', 25', 80'; Pen: Smith (2) 13', 61'; Cards: Kotze (yellow card) 80+3' | Report; Scorecard; Highlights | Try: Gunne (3) 6' m, 14' c, 39' c Smyth 85' c Con: Gabriel (2/3) 15', 40'; Byrne (1/1) 86'; Cards: McNeice (yellow card) 72' | Attendance: 4,613; Referee: Ben Breakspear (Wales) |

| 26 September | (1 BP) Sharks (South Africa) | 41–24 | (Wales) Ospreys (1 BP) | Kings Park Stadium, Durban |
| | Try: Hatton 12' c Tshituka 22' c Giliomee (2) 28' c, 67' c Bester 37' c Con: Moyo (4/4) 13', 23', 29', 38'; Masuka (1/1) 68'; Pen: Moyo (2) 53', 56' | Report; Scorecard; Highlights | Try: Morgan 32' c Parry 45' m Wright 45' c Hopkins 71' m Con: Creighton (2/4) 33', 46' | Attendance: 11,330; Referee: Gianluca Gnecci (Italy) |

| 26 September | (1 BP) Munster (Ireland) | 20–26 | (Scotland) Glasgow Warriors (1 BP) | Thomond Park, Limerick |
| | Try: O'Connor 14' c Milne 36' c Con: Hanrahan (2/2) 15', 37'; Pen: Hanrahan (2) 4', 58' | Report; Scorecard; Highlights | Try: Dobie (2) 31' c, 76' m McBeth 51' c Horne 67' x Con: Horne (3/4) 32', 52', 68'; Cards: Smith (yellow card) 8' | Attendance: 11,031; Referee: Morné Ferreira (South Africa) |

| 26 September | Zebre (Italy) | 13–47 | (South Africa) Bulls (1 BP) | Stadio Sergio Lanfranchi |
| | Try: Fusco 58' c Con: Allan (1/1) 59'; Pen: Allan (2) 14', 30'; Cards: Canali (yellow card) 26'; Pelliccioli (yellow card) 81' | Report; Scorecard; Highlights | Try: Ludwig (2) 31' c, 78' de Wet 38' c Vermaak 43' c Vorster 51' c Burger 83' m Con: Bosch (4/4) 32', 39', 43', 52' le Roux (1/2) 79' c Cards: Rudolph (yellow card) 77' | Attendance: 2,498; Referee: Andrew Brace |

| 26 September | (1 BP) Scarlets (Wales) | 15–21 | (Wales) Cardiff | Parc y Scarlets, Llanelli |
| | Try: Roberts 6' m Murray 23' c Con: Anscombe (1/2) 24'; Pen: Hawkins 52' | Report; Scorecard; Highlights | Try: Thomas 18' c Basham 38' c E Lloyd 65' c Con: Sheedy (2/2) 19', 39'; J Evans (1/1) 65' | Attendance: 7,073; Referee: A Jones |

=== Round 2 ===
| 2 October | (1 BP) Cardiff (Wales) | 40–27 | (Italy) Zebre (1 BP) | Cardiff Arms Park |
| | Try: T Williams 9' m Sebastien 18' c Basham 27' c Mann 36' c Bowen (2) 43' c, 54' c Con: Sheedy (4/5) 19', 27', 37', 44'; J Evans (1/1) 54' | Report; Scorecard; Highlights | Try: Minervino 21' m Ferrari 59' c Bertaccini 64' m Da Re 69' c Con: Da Re (2/4) 59', 70'; Pen: Allan 6' | Attendance: 7,231; Referee: Morné Ferreira (South Africa) |

| 2 October | Edinburgh (Scotland) | 17–13 | (South Africa) Stormers (1 BP) | Edinburgh Rugby Stadium |
| | Try: Hill 58' c McHaffie 71' c Con: Grayson (2/2) 59', 72'; Pen: Grayson 6'; Cards: Douglas (yellow card) 63' | Report; Scorecard; Highlights | Try: Dayimani 66' c Con: Ahmed (1/1) 67'; Pen: Ahmed (2) 48', 51'; Cards: Senatla (yellow card) 58' | Attendance: 6,652; Referee: Eoghan Cross (Ireland) |

| 2 October | Benetton (Italy) | 19–22 | (Ireland) Connacht (1 BP) | Stadio Monigo, Treviso |
| | Try: Bernasconi (2) 11' m, 51' c Marin 34' c Con: Umaga (2/3) 35', 52' | Report; Scorecard; Highlights | Try: Prendergast 5' m O'Brien 16' m Frawley (2) 37' c, 77' m Con: Gilbert (1/4) 38'; Cards: Bealham (yellow card) 39' | Attendance: 4,946; Referee: Hollie Davidson (Scotland) |

| 3 October | (1 BP) Lions (South Africa) | 35–19 | (Wales) Ospreys | Ellis Park Stadium, Jo'burg |
| | Try: Cronje 28' c Botha 43' m Brandon 49' m Chamberlain 57' m Mpeku (2) 63' m, 66' m Con: C Smith (1/6) 28'; Pen: C Smith (1) 11' | Report; Scorecard; Highlights | Try: Williams 34' c Daniel 42' m Moriarty 82' c Con: Edwards (2/3) 35', 83'; Cards: Edwards (yellow card) 61' | Attendance: 3,426; Referee: Filippo Russo (Italy) |

| 3 October | (1 BP) Dragons (Wales) | 38–26 | (Wales) Scarlets (1 BP) | Rodney Parade, Newport |
| | Try: Tuitavuki 13' c Dee (2) 22' m, 71' c Martinez 41' c Anderson 65' m Hunt 81' c Con: de Beer (3/5) 14', 43', 72'; Lloyd (1/1) 82' | Report; Scorecard; Highlights | Try: Page (2) 2' c, 28' c O'Connor 58' c Jones 73' m Con: Costelow (3/4) 3', 29', 59'; Cards: Macleod (yellow card) 68' | Attendance: 7,163; Referee: Adam Jones (Wales) |

| 3 October | (1 BP) Sharks (South Africa) | 26–20 | (Ireland) Leinster (1 BP) | Kings Park Stadium, Durban |
| | Try: Tshituka 26' c Bester 41' c Esterhuizen 69' c E van der Merwe 78' m Con: Moyo (3/4) 27', 42', 70' | Report; Scorecard; Highlights | Try: Henshaw 17' c Clarkson 49' m A Osborne 81' m Con: Gabriel (1/2) 18'; Pen: Prendergast (1) 66'; Cards: Clarkson (yellow card) 38' | Attendance: 19,044; Referee: Craig Evans (Wales) |

| 3 October | (1 BP) Munster (Ireland) | 26–22 | (South Africa) Bulls (1 BP) | Thomond Park, Limerick |
| | Try: Kilgallen 20' c O'Shea (2) 32' c, 55' m Kendellen 69' c Con: O'Shea (3/4) 21', 32', 70' | Report; Scorecard; Highlights | Try: Vermaak 15' c Klopper 36' c Rudolph 73' m Con: Bosch (2/3) 16', 37'; Pen: Bosch 44' | Attendance: 10,318; Referee: Federico Vedovelli (Italy) |

| 3 October | (1 BP) Glasgow Warriors (Scotland) | 33–33 | (Ireland) Ulster (1 BP) | Scotstoun Stadium |
| | Try: McKay 10' c Rowe (2) 26' c, 64' m Dobie 53' c Talakai 60' c Con: Horne (4/5) 11', 27', 54', 60'; Cards: Lancaster (yellow card) 19'; Darge (yellow card) 71'; Talakai (yellow card) 72' | Report; Scorecard; Highlights | Try: B Ward 4' c McIlroy 21' m Murphy 43' c Mullins 47' c Augustus 73' c Con: Murphy (3/4) 5', 44', 48'; Doak (1/1) 74'; Cards: Carson (yellow card) 50'; McIlroy (yellow card) 51' | Attendance: 7,321; Referee: Marius Jonker (South Africa) |

=== Round 3 ===
| 9 October | (1 BP) Glasgow Warriors (Scotland) | 36–19 | (Ireland) Connacht | Scotstoun Stadium |
| | Try: Hiddleston (2) 20' m, 43' c Darge 33' c McKay 43' c Stephen 65' c Con: Horne (4/5) 34', 44', 44', 66'; Pen: Lancaster 83'; Cards: Cummings (yellow card) 74' | Report; Scorecard; Highlights | Try: Jansen 15' c Ioane (2) 47' c, 59' m Con: Frawley (2/3) 16', 48'; Cards: Illo (yellow card) 42'; Murphy (yellow card) 62' | Attendance: 6,970; Referee: Ben Breakspear (Wales) |

| 9 October | (2 BP) Dragons (Wales) | 31–38 | (Wales) Ospreys (1 BP) | Rodney Parade, Newport |
| | Try: Dee (2) 5' c, 50' c penalty try, 40+3'; Tuitavuki 56' c Con: de Beer (3/3) 6', 51', 57'; Pen: O'Brien 82' | Report; Scorecard; Highlights | Try: Moriarty 17' c Giles 35' m Parry (2) 46' c, 54' c Morris (2) 72' m, 79' c Con: Edwards (4/6) 18', 47', 55', 80'; Cards: Moriarty (yellow card) 42' | Attendance: 6,037; Referee: Robbie Jenkinson (Ireland) |

| 10 October | (1 BP) Bulls (South Africa) | 57–15 | (South Africa) Lions | Loftus Versfeld, Pretoria |
| | Try: Vorster 10' m Grobbelaar 26' c Hanekom (2) 30' c, 35' m Rudolph 40' c Moodie 44' m van Heerden 68' c Jooste 74' c de Klerk 80' c Con: Bosch (3/6) 26', 30', 41'; Pollard (3/3) 69', 75', 81' | Report; Scorecard; Highlights | Try: Qoma 18' c Brandon 50' m Con: C Smith 19' c Pen: C Smith 33'; Cards: Morne van den Berg (yellow card) 26' | Attendance: 11,307; Referee: Hanru van Rooyen (South Africa) |

| 10 October | (1 BP) Stormers (South Africa) | 39–22 | (South Africa) Sharks | Cape Town Stadium |
| | Try: Senatla 6'; Dayimani (2) 37' c, 47' c Zas 41' m Venter 43' c Kotze 64' m Con: Feinberg-Mngomezulu (3/6) 38', 44', 48'; Pen: Feinberg-Mngomezulu 13' | Report; Scorecard; Highlights | Try: Tshituka 15' m Romao 51' c Buthelezi 57' c Con: Lombard (2/3) 52', 58'; Pen: Lombard 31'; Cards: Romoa (yellow card) 36'; Tshituka (yellow card) 43' | Attendance: 42,368; Referee: Morné Ferreira (South Africa) |

| 10 October | Zebre (Italy) | 12–29 | (Scotland) Edinburgh (1 BP) | Stadio Sergio Lanfranchi |
| | Try: Fusco 12' m Ferrari 72' c Con: Allan (1/2) 72'; Cards: Fusco (yellow card) 36' | Report; Scorecard; Highlights | Try: M Currie 30' c Douglas 37' m Bradbury 56' c T Currie 80' c Con: Grayson (3/4) 30', 56', 81'; Pen: Grayson 6'; Cards: Satala-Navlivou (yellow card) 8'; Morris (yellow card) 61' | Attendance: 2,305; Referee: Adam Jones (Wales) |

| 10 October | (1 BP) Scarlets (Wales) | 27–26 | (Italy) Benetton (2 BP) | Parc y Scarlets, Llanelli |
| | Try: Lousi 4' c Murray 53' c Mee (2) 56' m, 65' m Con: Costelow (2/4) 5', 54'; Pen: Costelow 79' | Report; Scorecard; Highlights | Try: Maile 10' c Ratave 24' c Lamaro 38' c Lynagh 73' m Con: Umaga (3/4) 11', 24', 39' | Attendance: 6,026; Referee: Peter Martin |

| 10 October | (1 BP) Ulster (Ireland) | 26–26 | (Ireland) Munster (1 BP) | Ravenhill Stadium, Belfast |
| | Try: Stockdale (2) 12' m, 53' c McCann 68' c McCloskey 77' c Con: Murphy (3/4) 54', 69', 78'; Cards: Izuchukwu (yellow card) 29' | Report, 2 Scorecard; Highlights | Try: Kendellen (2) 9' m, 40' c Merwe 15' c Kelly 32' c Con: Hanrahan (3/4) 16', 32', 41' | Attendance: 12,814; Referee: Craig Evans (Wales) |

| 10 October | (1 BP) Leinster (Ireland) | 29–5 | (Wales) Cardiff | RDS Arena, Dublin |
| | Try: Keenan 9' m J O'Brien (2) 17' m, 37' c Conan 19' m J Osborne 77' c Con: Prendergast (2/5) 39', 78' | Report; Scorecard; Highlights | Try: Grady 24' m Cards: Davies (yellow card) 15' | Attendance: 20,035; Referee: Sam Grove-White (Scotland) |

=== Round 4 ===
| 23 October | Cardiff (Wales) | 21–36 | (South Africa) Sharks (1 BP) | Cardiff Arms Park |
| | Try: Adams 10' c Botham (2) 45' c, 58' c Con: Evans (3/3) 11', 46', 59' | Report; Scorecard; Highlights | Try: Hooker 2' m Romao (2) 25' c, 80' m Jenkins 43' m du Toit 62' c Bester 74' c Con: Lombard (2/4) 27', 63'; Masuka (1/2) 75' | Attendance: 8,076; Referee: Andrea Piardi (Italy) |

| 23 October | (1 BP) Connacht (Ireland) | 48–27 | (Italy) Zebre (1 BP) | The Sportsground, Galway |
| | Try: Bealham 9' c Jansen 14' m Forde 18' c Gilbert 23' c Prendergast 31' c Heffernan (2) 55' m, 80' m West 68' m Con: Frawley (4/6) 9', 19', 24', 31' | Report; Scorecard; Highlights | Try: Giacomo Ferrari 5' m Jacopo Botturi 28' c Mirko Belloni 33' m Giampietro Ribaldi 71' m Bautista Stavile 77' m Con: Giovanni Montemauri (1/3) 29' | Attendance: 5,897; Referee: Hanru van Rooyen (South Africa) |

| 23 October | (1 BP) Edinburgh (Scotland) | 31–10 | (South Africa) Lions | Edinburgh Rugby Stadium |
| | Try: Currie 20' m Tuipulotu 47' c Patterson (2) 51' c, 65' m Gwynn 74' c Con: Grayson (2/4) 48', 52'; Scott (1/1) 75' | Report; Scorecard; Highlights | Try: Hlekani 57' c Con: C Smith (1/1) 58'; Pen: C Smith 34' | Attendance: 6,377; Referee: Peter Martin (Ireland) |

| 24 October | (1 BP) Bulls (South Africa) | 34–26 | (Ireland) Ulster (1 BP) | Loftus Versfeld, Pretoria |
| | Try: Coetzee (2) 2' c, 32' c Louw 18' c Grobbelaar 66' c Con: Pollard (4/4) 3', 19', 33', 67'; Pen: Pollard, 50'; Bosch, 80+2'; Cards: Coetzee (yellow card) 44' | Report; Scorecard; Highlights | Try: Mullins 40+1' c McCann 45' c McCloskey, 70' c Con: Murphy (3/4) 40+2', 45', 71' | Attendance: 6,422; Referee: Ru Campbell (Scotland) |

| 24 October | (1 BP) Stormers (South Africa) | 52–40 | (Wales) Scarlets (1 BP) | Cape Town Stadium |
| | Try: Porthen 11' m Pead 16' c Mchunu 28' c Senatla 34' c Fourie 42' c Reid 55' c Ahmed (2) 74' c, 80' m Con: Feinberg-Mngomezulu (6/8) 17', 29', 35', 42', 56', 75' | Report; Scorecard; Highlights | Try: Roberts (3) 19' c, 46' c, 65' c Jones 31' c Page 42' c Macleod 60' m Con: Leggatt-Jones (5/6) 20', 32', 43', 47', 66'; Cards: McKee (yellow card) 10' | Attendance: 16,921; Referee: Robbie Jenkinson |

| 24 October | (1 BP) Benetton (Italy) | 20–24 | (Scotland) Glasgow Warriors (1 BP) | Stadio Monigo, Treviso |
| | Try: Zanandrea 30' c Lynagh 42' c Con: Umaga (2/2) 31', 43'; Pen: Umaga (2) 41', 69'; Cards: Midena (yellow card) 46' | Report; Scorecard; Highlights | Try: Ferrie 50' c Steyn 53'm Darge 56' m Oguntibeju 78' c Con: Urwin (1/3) 51'; Kuenzle (1/1) 79' | Attendance: 5,000; Referee: Griffen Colby (South Africa) |

| 24 October | (1 BP) Leinster (Ireland) | 24–18 | (Ireland) Munster (1 BP) | Aviva Stadium, Dublin |
| | Try: T O'Brien 34' m Baird 55' c Tector 64' m J Osborne 73' c Con: Carbery (2/4) 56', 74' | Report; Scorecard; Highlights | Try: Daly 27' c O'Connor 82' m Con: O'Shea (1/2) 28'; Pen: O'Shea (2) 7', 30'; Cards: Nankivell (yellow card) 55' | Attendance: 37,193; Referee: Andrew Brace (Ireland) |

| 24 October | (1 BP) Ospreys (Wales) | 31–14 | (Wales) Dragons | St Helen's, Swansea |
| | Try: Morgan-Williams (2) 6' c, 30' c Parry 36' m penalty try 42'; Moriarty 54' m Con: Edwards (2) 7', 31' | Report; Scorecard; Highlights | Try: Dyer 43' c Tuitavuki 64' c Con: de Beer (2/2) 44', 65'; Cards: Williams (yellow card) 42' de Beer (yellow card) 54'; Owen (yellow card) 68' | Attendance: 5,592; Referee: Ben Whitehouse (Wales) |

=== Round 5 ===
| 30 October | Connacht (Ireland) | 5–50 | (Ireland) Leinster (1 BP) | The Sportsground, Galway |
| | Try: Heffernan, 28' m | Report; Scorecard; Highlights | Try: McCarthy 16' c Larmour 25' c Lawlor 32' c Deegan 52' m Carbery 61' c Mangan 73' c Gunne 78' c Con: Carbery (6/7) 17', 26', 33', 61', 74', 78'; Pen: Carbery 51' | Attendance: 12,500; Referee: Hollie Davidson (Scotland) |

| 30 October | (1 BP) Glasgow Warriors (Scotland) | 29–20 | (South Africa) Lions | Scotstoun Stadium |
| | Try: Watson 10' c Lancaster 29' c Singleton 35' m Smith 76' c Con: Horne (3/4) 11', 30', 77'; Pen: Horne 82' | Report; Scorecard; Highlights | Try: van den Berg 50' c Mahashe 65' m Brandon 70' m Con: Chamberlain (1/3) 51'; Pen: C Smith 14'; Cards: Oosthuizen (yellow card) 28' | Attendance: 7,321; Referee: Andrea Piardi (Italy) |

| 31 October | (1 BP) Stormers (South Africa) | 33–7 | (Ireland) Ulster | Cape Town Stadium |
| | Try: Schickerling 32' c de Villiers 37' m Roos 45' c Nel 70' c Ahmed 76' c Con: Ahmed (4/5) 33', 46', 71', 77' | Report; Scorecard; Highlights | Try: McCann 19' c Con: Murphy (1/1) 20'; Cards: Knox (yellow card) 29' | Attendance: 18,600; Referee: Sam Grove-White (Scotland) |

| 31 October | (1 BP) Bulls (South Africa) | 54–26 | (Wales) Scarlets (1 BP) | Loftus Versfeld, Pretoria |
| | Try: Rudolph 11' c le Roux 17' m Maart (2) 27' c, 74' c Coetzee (2) 45' c, 58' c de Klerk 63' c Grobbelaar 67' c Con: Bosch (7/8) 11', 28', 45', 59', 64', 68', 75'; Cards: Gans (yellow card) 47' | Report; Scorecard; Highlights | Try: McKee 30' m Lousi 36' c Hughes 51' c Roberts 55' c Con: Leggatt-Jones (3/4) 37', 52', 56' | Attendance: 9,026; Referee: Eoghan Cross (Ireland) |

| 31 October | (1 BP) Benetton (Italy) | 31–12 | (Scotland) Edinburgh | Stadio Monigo, Treviso |
| | Try: Gritti 2' m Mendy 25' m Bernasconi 33' m Ratave 50' c Con: Umaga (1/4) 51'; Pen: Umaga (2) 42', 44'; J Smith 76'; Cards: Medrano (red card) 9' (20') | Report; Scorecard; Highlights | Try: Morris 56' c Paterson 71' m Con: Grayson (1/2) 56'; Cards: Hunter-Hill (yellow card) 32' | Attendance: 4,521; Referee: Hanru van Rooyen (South Africa) |

| 31 October | Munster (Ireland) | 3–15 | (South Africa) Sharks | Thomond Park, Limerick |
| | Pen: JJ Hanrahan 40' | Report; Scorecard; Highlights | Try: Lombard 15' m van Zyl 59' c Con: Lombard (1/2) 60'; Pen: Lombard 54'; Cards: Nché (yellow card) 56' | Attendance: 10,403; Referee: Ben Connor (Wales) |

| 31 October | (1 BP) Dragons (Wales) | 35–14 | (Italy) Zebre | Rodney Parade, Newport |
| | Try: Richards 6' c Tuitavuki 29' c Inisi 55' c Evans 72' c penalty try, 88'; Con: de Beer (4/4) 7', 30', 56', 73' | Report; Scorecard; Highlights | Try: Canali 64' c Wade 79' c Con: Da Re (2/2) 65', 79'; Cards: Gesi (yellow card) 55' | Attendance: 4,358; Referee: Griffin Colby (South Africa) |

| 31 October | Ospreys (Wales) | 0–26 | (Wales) Cardiff (1 BP) | St Helen's, Swansea |
| | | Report; Scorecard; Highlights | Try: Bowen (2) 7' c, 20' c Adams 31' m Howe 68' c Con: Evans (2/3) 8', 21'; Sheedy (1/3) 69' | Attendance: 5,592; Referee: Ben Breakspear (Wales) |

=== Round 6 ===
| 4 December | Ospreys (Wales) | v | (Ireland) Leinster | St Helen's, Swansea |

| 4 December | Edinburgh (Scotland) | v | (Wales) Dragons | Edinburgh Rugby Stadium |

| 5 December | Lions (South Africa) | v | (South Africa) Bulls | Ellis Park Stadium, Jo'burg |

| 5 December | Sharks (South Africa) | v | (South Africa) Stormers | Kings Park Stadium, Durban |

| 5 December | Cardiff (Wales) | v | (Ireland) Ulster | Cardiff Arms Park |

| 5 December | Scarlets (Wales) | v | (Ireland) Connacht | Parc y Scarlets, Llanelli |

| 5 December | Glasgow Warriors (Scotland) | v | (Italy) Benetton | Scotstoun Stadium |

| 5 December | Zebre (Italy) | v | (Ireland) Munster | Stadio Sergio Lanfranchi |

=== Round 7 ===
| 18 December | Ulster (Ireland) | v | (Wales) Ospreys | Ravenhill Stadium, Belfast |

| 18 December | Munster (Ireland) | v | (Wales) Scarlets | Musgrave Park, Cork |

| 19 December | Zebre (Italy) | v | (Italy) Benetton | Stadio Sergio Lanfranchi |

| 19 December | Stormers (South Africa) | v | (South Africa) Lions | Cape Town Stadium |

| 19 December | Cardiff (Wales) | v | (Wales) Dragons | Cardiff Arms Park |

| 19 December | Sharks (South Africa) | v | (South Africa) Bulls | Kings Park Stadium, Durban |

| 19 December | Leinster (Ireland) | v | (Scotland) Glasgow Warriors | RDS Arena, Dublin |

| 19 December | Connacht (Ireland) | v | (Scotland) Edinburgh | The Sportsground, Galway |

=== Round 8 ===
| 26 December | Dragons (Wales) | v | (Wales) Cardiff | Rodney Parade, Newport |

| 26 December | Ospreys (Wales) | v | (Wales) Scarlets | St Helen's, Swansea |

| 27 December | Benetton (Italy) | v | (Italy) Zebre | Stadio Monigo, Treviso |

| 27 December | Edinburgh (Scotland) | v | (Scotland) Glasgow Warriors | Murrayfield Stadium, Edinburgh |

| 27 December | Ulster (Ireland) | v | (Ireland) Connacht | Ravenhill Stadium, Belfast |

| 27 December | Munster (Ireland) | v | (Ireland) Leinster | Thomond Park, Limerick |

| 20 February | Lions (South Africa) | v | (South Africa) Sharks | Ellis Park Stadium, Jo'burg |

| 21 February | Bulls (South Africa) | v | (South Africa) Stormers | Loftus Versfeld, Pretoria |

=== Round 9 ===
| 2 January | Sharks (South Africa) | v | (South Africa) Lions | Kings Park Stadium, Durban |

| 2 January | Zebre (Italy) | v | (Scotland) Glasgow Warriors | Stadio Sergio Lanfranchi |

| 2 January | Scarlets (Wales) | v | (Wales) Dragons | Parc y Scarlets, Llanelli |

| 2 January | Connacht (Ireland) | v | (Ireland) Munster | The Sportsground, Galway |

| 2 January | Edinburgh (Scotland) | v | (Italy) Benetton | Edinburgh Rugby Stadium |

| 2 January | Cardiff (Wales) | v | (Wales) Ospreys | Cardiff Arms Park |

| 2 January | Leinster (Ireland) | v | (Ireland) Ulster | RDS Arena, Dublin |

| 3 January | Stormers (South Africa) | v | (South Africa) Bulls | Cape Town Stadium |

=== Round 10 ===
| 22 January | Glasgow Warriors (Scotland) | v | (Wales) Scarlets | Scotstoun Stadium |

| 22 January | Ulster (Ireland) | v | (South Africa) Sharks | Ravenhill Stadium, Belfast |

| 23 January | Lions (South Africa) | v | (Italy) Zebre | Ellis Park Stadium, Jo'burg |

| 23 January | Stormers (South Africa) | v | (Wales) Cardiff | Cape Town Stadium |

| 23 January | Ospreys (Wales) | v | (Scotland) Edinburgh | St Helen's, Swansea |

| 23 January | Benetton (Italy) | v | (South Africa) Bulls | Stadio Monigo, Treviso |

| 23 January | Leinster (Ireland) | v | (Wales) Dragons | RDS Arena, Dublin |

| 23 January | Munster (Ireland) | v | (Ireland) Connacht | Thomond Park, Limerick |

=== Round 11 ===
| 29 January | Dragons (Wales) | v | (Ireland) Munster | Rodney Parade, Newport |

| 29 January | Glasgow Warriors (Scotland) | v | (Wales) Ospreys | Scotstoun Stadium |

| 30 January | Lions (South Africa) | v | (Wales) Cardiff | Ellis Park Stadium, Jo'burg |

| 30 January | Stormers (South Africa) | v | (Italy) Zebre | Cape Town Stadium |

| 30 January | Scarlets (Wales) | v | (Scotland) Edinburgh | Parc y Scarlets, Llanelli |

| 30 January | Leinster (Ireland) | v | (South Africa) Bulls | RDS Arena, Dublin |

| 30 January | Benetton (Italy) | v | (South Africa) Sharks | Stadio Monigo, Treviso |

| 30 January | Connacht (Ireland) | v | (Ireland) Ulster | The Sportsground, Galway |

=== Round 12 ===
| 26 February | Munster (Ireland) | v | (Italy) Benetton | Musgrave Park, Cork |

| 26 February | Dragons (Wales) | v | (Ireland) Ulster | Rodney Parade, Newport |

| 27 February | Lions (South Africa) | v | (South Africa) Stormers | Ellis Park Stadium, Jo'burg |

| 27 February | Bulls (South Africa) | v | (South Africa) Sharks | Loftus Versfeld, Pretoria |

| 27 February | Cardiff (Wales) | v | (Scotland) Glasgow Warriors | Cardiff Arms Park |

| 27 February | Zebre (Italy) | v | (Wales) Scarlets | Stadio Sergio Lanfranchi |

| 27 February | Ospreys (Wales) | v | (Ireland) Connacht | St Helen's, Swansea |

| 27 February | Edinburgh (Scotland) | v | (Ireland) Leinster | Edinburgh Rugby Stadium |

=== Round 13 ===
| 19 March | Sharks (South Africa) | v | (Scotland) Edinburgh | Kings Park Stadium, Durban |

| 19 March | Glasgow Warriors (Scotland) | v | (South Africa) Stormers | Scotstoun Stadium |

| 19 March | Connacht (Ireland) | v | (Wales) Cardiff | The Sportsground, Galway |

| 20 March | Ulster (Ireland) | v | (Italy) Zebre | Ravenhill Stadium, Belfast |

| 20 March | Bulls (South Africa) | v | (Wales) Dragons | Loftus Versfeld, Pretoria |

| 20 March | Munster (Ireland) | v | (Wales) Ospreys | Thomond Park, Limerick |

| 20 March | Scarlets (Wales) | v | (South Africa) Lions | Parc y Scarlets, Llanelli |

| 20 March | Leinster (Ireland) | v | (Italy) Benetton | RDS Arena, Dublin |

=== Round 14 ===
| 26 March | Glasgow Warriors (Scotland) | v | (Italy) Zebre | Scotstoun Stadium |

| 26 March | Scarlets (Wales) | v | (Ireland) Leinster | Parc y Scarlets, Llanelli |

| 27 March | Bulls (South Africa) | v | (Scotland) Edinburgh | Loftus Versfeld, Pretoria |

| 27 March | Connacht (Ireland) | v | (South Africa) Lions | The Sportsground, Galway |

| 27 March | Sharks (South Africa) | v | (Wales) Dragons | Kings Park Stadium, Durban |

| 27 March | Cardiff (Wales) | v | (Ireland) Munster | Cardiff Arms Park |

| 27 March | Benetton (Italy) | v | (Ireland) Ulster | Stadio Monigo, Treviso |

| 27 March | Ospreys (Wales) | v | (South Africa) Stormers | St Helen's, Swansea |

=== Round 15 ===
| 16 April | Dragons (Wales) | v | (Scotland) Glasgow Warriors | Rodney Parade, Newport |

| 16 April | Edinburgh (Scotland) | v | (Wales) Cardiff | Edinburgh Rugby Stadium |

| 17 April | Lions (South Africa) | v | (Ireland) Munster | Ellis Park Stadium, Jo'burg |

| 17 April | Stormers (South Africa) | v | (Italy) Benetton | Cape Town Stadium |

| 17 April | Ospreys (Wales) | v | (South Africa) Bulls | St Helen's, Swansea |

| 17 April | Leinster (Ireland) | v | (Ireland) Connacht | RDS Arena, Dublin |

| 17 April | Ulster (Ireland) | v | (Wales) Scarlets | Ravenhill Stadium, Belfast |

| 17 April | Zebre (Italy) | v | (South Africa) Sharks | Stadio Sergio Lanfranchi |

=== Round 16 ===
| 23 April | Zebre (Italy) | v | (Wales) Ospreys | Stadio Sergio Lanfranchi |

| 23 April | Ulster (Ireland) | v | (Ireland) Leinster | Ravenhill Stadium, Belfast |

| 23 April | Cardiff (Wales) | v | (South Africa) Bulls | Cardiff Arms Park |

| 24 April | Lions (South Africa) | v | (Italy) Benetton | Ellis Park Stadium, Jo'burg |

| 24 April | Scarlets (Wales) | v | (South Africa) Sharks | Parc y Scarlets, Llanelli |

| 24 April | Stormers (South Africa) | v | (Ireland) Munster | Cape Town Stadium |

| 24 April | Glasgow Warriors (Scotland) | v | (Scotland) Edinburgh | Hampden Park |

| 24 April | Connacht (Ireland) | v | (Wales) Dragons | The Sportsground, Galway |

=== Round 17 ===
| 7 May | Dragons (Wales) | v | (South Africa) Lions | Rodney Parade, Newport |

| 7 May | Edinburgh (Scotland) | v | (Italy) Zebre | Edinburgh Rugby Stadium |

| 8 May | Sharks (South Africa) | v | (Ireland) Connacht | Kings Park Stadium, Durban |

| 8 May | Bulls (South Africa) | v | (Scotland) Glasgow Warriors | Loftus Versfeld, Pretoria |

| 8 May | Munster (Ireland) | v | (Ireland) Ulster | Thomond Park, Limerick |

| 8 May | Scarlets (Wales) | v | (Wales) Ospreys | Parc y Scarlets, Llanelli |

| 8 May | Leinster (Ireland) | v | (South Africa) Stormers | RDS Arena, Dublin |

| 8 May | Benetton (Italy) | v | (Wales) Cardiff | Stadio Monigo, Treviso |

=== Round 18 ===
| 14 May | Ospreys (Wales) | v | (Italy) Benetton | St Helen's, Swansea |

| 14 May | Ulster (Ireland) | v | (South Africa) Lions | Ravenhill Stadium, Belfast |

| 14 May | Edinburgh (Scotland) | v | (Ireland) Munster | Edinburgh Rugby Stadium |

| 15 May | Bulls (South Africa) | v | (Ireland) Connacht | Loftus Versfeld, Pretoria |

| 15 May | Cardiff (Wales) | v | (Wales) Scarlets | Cardiff Arms Park |

| 15 May | Sharks (South Africa) | v | (Scotland) Glasgow Warriors | Kings Park Stadium, Durban |

| 15 May | Dragons (Wales) | v | (South Africa) Stormers | Rodney Parade, Newport |

| 15 May | Zebre (Italy) | v | (Ireland) Leinster | Stadio Sergio Lanfranchi |

== Knockout stage ==
=== Bracket ===
The top eight teams in the regular season standings advance to the knockout stage, a single-elimination tournament culminating in a Grand Final to crown the overall champion.

Teams are seeded based on the regular season standings, with teams ranked 1–4 receiving home field advantage in the quarter-final, with 1 playing 8, 2 playing 7 etc. The top two teams in the standings are seeded so as not to meet until the Grand Final.

Home-field advantage for the semi-finals and Grand Final will be awarded to the highest-ranked team in each tie; the top two teams are therefore guaranteed home advantage until the final for as long as they remain in the tournament, and the top ranked team in the standings will be awarded home advantage should they reach the Grand Final.

Quarter-finals
1
8
4
5
3
6
2
7

Semi-finals

Final

=== Quarter-finals ===
| 29 May 2027 | (1) | v | (8) |

| 29 May 2027 | (4) | v | (5) |

| 29 May 2027 | (3) | v | (6) |

| 29 May 2027 | (2) | v | (7) |

=== Semi-finals ===
| 05 June 2027 | TBD | v | TBD |

| 05 June 2027 | TBD | v | TBD |

=== Final ===
| 19 June 2027 | TBD | v | TBD |

== Leading scorers ==
Note: Flags to the left of player names indicate national team as has been defined under World Rugby eligibility rules, or primary nationality for players who have not yet earned international senior caps. Players may hold one or more non-WR nationalities.

As of 26 October 2026

=== Most points ===
| Rank | Player | Club | Points |
|---|---|---|---|
| 1 | (England) James Grayson | (Scotland) Edinburgh | 34 |
| 2 | (Ireland) Jack Murphy | (Ireland) Ulster | 32 |
| 3 | (South Africa) Chris Smith | (South Africa) Lions | 27 |
| 3 | (Scotland) George Horne | (Scotland) Glasgow Warriors | 27 |
| 5 | (South Africa) Tinus de Beer | (Wales) Dragons | 25 |
| 5 | (Wales) Elliot Dee | (Wales) Dragons | 25 |
| 7 | (South Africa) Curwin Bosch | (South Africa) Bulls | 24 |
| 7 | (Samoa) Jacob Umaga | (Italy) Benetton | 24 |
| 7 | (Ireland) Charlie O'Shea | (Ireland) Munster | 24 |
| 10 | (Ireland) Ciarán Frawley | (Ireland) Connacht | 22 |

=== Most tries ===
| Rank | Player | Club | Tries |
|---|---|---|---|
| 1 | (Wales) Elliot Dee | (Wales) Dragons | 5 |
| 2 | (Wales) Joe Roberts | (Wales) Scarlets | 4 |
| 2 | (Wales) Sam Parry | (Wales) Ospreys | 4 |
| 4 | (Ireland) Chay Mullins | (Ireland) Ulster | 3 |
| 4 | (New Zealand) Josh Ioane | (Ireland) Connacht | 3 |
| 4 | (Ireland) Dave McCann | (Ireland) Ulster | 3 |
| 4 | (South Africa) Hacjivah Dayimani | (South Africa) Stormers | 3 |
| 4 | (Wales) Ross Moriarty | (Wales) Ospreys | 3 |
| 4 | (Scotland) Jamie Dobie | (Scotland) Glasgow Warriors | 3 |
| 4 | (South Africa) Erich Cronjé | (South Africa) Lions | 3 |
| 4 | (Tonga) Anzelo Tuitavuki | (Wales) Dragons | 3 |
| 4 | (Ireland) Alex Kendellen | (Ireland) Munster | 3 |
| 4 | (Italy) Giacomo Ferrari | (Italy) Zebre Parma | 3 |
| 4 | (South Africa) Manu Tshituka | (South Africa) Sharks | 3 |
| 4 | (Argentina) Bautista Bernasconi | (Italy) Benetton | 3 |
| 4 | (Ireland) Fintan Gunne | (Ireland) Leinster | 3 |
| 4 | (South Africa) Kelly Mpeku | (South Africa) Lions | 3 |
| 4 | (Scotland) Hector Patterson | (Scotland) Edinburgh | 3 |
| 4 | (Wales) Macs Page | (Wales) Scarlets | 3 |
| 4 | (South Africa) Matt Romao | (South Africa) Sharks | 3 |
