= 2026–27 Leinster Rugby season =

Leinster Rugby
- 2026–27 season
- Head coach: Leo Cullen
- Highest home attendance: 37,193 v Munster, Aviva Stadium, Rd 4 URC
- Lowest home attendance: 20,035 v Cardiff, RDS Arena, Rd 3 URC

The 2026–27 season is Leinster Rugby's sixth season in the United Rugby Championship, and 26th in all formats of the competition. Along with competing in the URC and its Irish Shield competition, the club will also participate in the 2026–27 European Rugby Champions Cup.

Leinster will enter the season as reigning, back-to-back and ten-time United Rugby Championship champions, seeking a third consecutive league championship title and eleventh overall; as five-time URC Irish Shield Champions, and as European Rugby Champions Cup runners-up seeking a fifth European Champions Cup title.

The 2026–27 season also sees Leinster return to the upgraded RDS Arena, renamed the Laya Arena for sponsorship purposes, from their residency at the Aviva Stadium, although selected matches may still be played at the Aviva or Croke Park.

== Squad and management ==
Leo Cullen continues in post as had coach for the 2026–27 season, in what is the final year on his current contract.

=== Transfers ===
The departure of James Lowe to Japan after 11 years with the province, simultaneously ending his career with Leinster and Ireland, and the departure home of All Black loanee Rieko Ioane headline the movements out of the club; Irish internationals Ciarán Frawley, Jerry Cahir and Will Connors also leave for Connacht Rugby, but Joey Carbery is expected to return from France.

=== Players in ===
- (Ireland) Stephen Smyth (promoted from Academy)
- (Ireland) Conor O'Tighearnaigh (promoted from Academy)
- (Ireland) Josh Kenny (promoted from Academy)
- (Ireland) Joey Carbery from (France) Bordeaux
- (Ireland) Peter Dooley from (Ireland) Connacht

=== Players out ===
- (New Zealand) Rieko Ioane to (New Zealand) Blues
- (Ireland) Ciarán Frawley to (Ireland) Connacht
- (Ireland) Will Connors to (Ireland) Connacht
- (Ireland) Luke McGrath to (France) Perpignan
- (France) Rabah Slimani to (France) Toulon
- (Ireland) Jerry Cahir to (Ireland) Connacht
- (Ireland) John McKee to (Wales) Scarlets
- (Ireland) James Lowe to (Japan) Tokyo Sungoliath

== United Rugby Championship ==
=== Matches ===
Leinster Rugby will begin their sixth URC campaign away to South African side Lions. The first fixture at their traditional home, the renamed Laya Arena, occurs in Round 3 against Cardiff. The venue for the now traditional 'blockbuster' home match against Irish rivals Munster will be held in the Aviva Stadium.

26 September	Lions (South Africa)	27–26	(Ireland) Leinster (2 BP)	Ellis Park Stadium, Jo'burg
	Try: Cronjé (2) 9' c, 24' c Mpeku 79' c Con: Smith (3/3) 9', 25', 80'; Pen: Smith (2) 13', 61'; Cards: Kotze (yellow card) 80+3'	Report; Scorecard; Highlights	Try: Gunne (3) 6' m, 14' c, 39' c Smyth 85' c Con: Gabriel (2/3) 15', 40'; Byrne (1/1) 86'; Cards: McNeice (yellow card) 72'	Attendance: 4,613; Referee: Ben Breakspear (Wales)

3 October	(1 BP) Sharks (South Africa)	26–20	(Ireland) Leinster (1 BP)	Kings Park Stadium, Durban
	Try: Tshituka 26' c Bester 41' c Esterhuizen 69' c E van der Merwe 78' m Con: Moyo (3/4) 27', 42', 70'	Report; Scorecard; Highlights	Try: Henshaw 17' c Clarkson 49' m A Osborne 81' m Con: Gabriel (1/2) 18'; Pen: Prendergast (1) 66'; Cards: Clarkson (yellow card) 38'	Attendance: 19,044; Referee: Craig Evans (Wales)

10 October	(1 BP) Leinster (Ireland)	29–5	(Wales) Cardiff	Laya Arena, Dublin
	Try: Keenan 9' m J O'Brien (2) 17' m, 37' c Conan 19' m J Osborne 77' c Con: Prendergast (2/5) 39', 78'	Report; Scorecard; Highlights	Try: Grady 24' m Cards: Davies (yellow card) 15'	Attendance: 20,035; Referee: Sam Grove-White (Scotland)

24 October	(1 BP) Leinster (Ireland)	24–18	(Ireland) Munster (1 BP)	Aviva Stadium, Dublin
	Try: T O'Brien 34' m Baird 55' c Tector 64' m J Osborne 73' c Con: Carbery (2/4) 56', 74'	Report; Scorecard; Highlights	Try: Daly 27' c O'Connor 82' m Con: O'Shea (1/2) 28'; Pen: O'Shea (2) 7', 30'; Cards: Nankivell (yellow card) 55'	Attendance: 37,193; Referee: Andrew Brace (Ireland)

30 October	Connacht (Ireland)	5–50	(Ireland) Leinster (1 BP)	The Sportsground, Galway
	Try: Heffernan, 28' m	Report; Scorecard; Highlights	Try: McCarthy 16' c Larmour 25' c Lawlor 32' c Deegan 52' m Carbery 61' c Mangan 73' c Gunne 78' c Con: Carbery (6/7) 17', 26', 33', 61', 74', 78'; Pen: Carbery 51'	Attendance: 12,500; Referee: Hollie Davidson (Scotland)

4 December 2026	Ospreys (Wales)	v	(Ireland) Leinster	St Helen's, Swansea

19 December 2026	Leinster (Ireland)	v	(Scotland) Glasgow Warriors	Laya Arena, Dublin

27 December 2026	Munster (Ireland)	v	(Ireland) Leinster	Thomond Park, Limerick

2 January 2027	Leinster (Ireland)	v	(Ireland) Ulster	Laya Arena, Dublin

23 January 2027	Leinster (Ireland)	v	(Wales) Dragons	Laya Arena, Dublin

30 January 2027	Leinster (Ireland)	v	(South Africa) Bulls	Laya Arena, Dublin

27 February 2027	Edinburgh (Scotland)	v	(Ireland) Leinster	Edinburgh Rugby Stadium

20 March 2027	Leinster (Ireland)	v	(Italy) Benetton	Laya Arena, Dublin

26 March 2027	Scarlets (Wales)	v	(Ireland) Leinster	Parc y Scarlets, Llanelli

17 April 2027	Leinster (Ireland)	v	(Ireland) Connacht	Laya Arena, Dublin

23 April 2027	Ulster (Ireland)	v	(Ireland) Leinster	Ravenhill Stadium, Belfast

8 May 2027	Leinster (Ireland)	v	(South Africa) Stormers	Laya Arena, Dublin

15 May 2027	Zebre Parma (Italy)	v	(Ireland) Leinster	Stadio Sergio Lanfranchi

=== Standings ===
Pos	Team	Pld	W	D	L	PF	PA	PD	TF	TA	TB	LB	Pts	Qualification
1	Glasgow Warriors	5	4	1	0	148	112	+36	22	15	5	0	23	Qualification for the Champions Cup and knockout stage
2	Edinburgh	4	4	0	0	111	64	+47	15	8	3	0	19	Qualification for the Champions Cup and knockout stage
3	Leinster	5	3	0	2	149	81	+68	23	11	4	2	18	Qualification for the Champions Cup and knockout stage
4	Bulls	4	3	0	1	160	90	+70	23	11	3	1	16	Qualification for the Champions Cup and knockout stage
5	Stormers	4	3	0	1	133	94	+39	19	13	3	1	16	Qualification for the Champions Cup and knockout stage
6	Sharks	4	3	0	1	125	104	+21	18	16	3	0	15	Qualification for the Champions Cup and knockout stage
7	Ospreys	4	2	0	2	112	121	−9	18	17	3	0	11	Qualification for the Champions Cup and knockout stage
8	Connacht	5	2	0	3	109	161	−52	18	24	2	0	10	Qualification for the Champions Cup and knockout stage
9	Munster	4	1	1	2	90	98	−8	12	15	2	2	10	Qualification for the Challenge Cup
10	Cardiff	4	2	0	2	87	107	−20	13	17	1	0	9	Qualification for the Challenge Cup
11	Lions	5	2	0	3	107	162	−55	15	25	1	0	9	Qualification for the Challenge Cup
12	Ulster	4	0	2	2	114	127	−13	17	17	4	1	9	Qualification for the Challenge Cup
13	Dragons	4	1	1	2	102	114	−12	15	18	2	1	9	Qualification for the Challenge Cup
14	Scarlets	4	1	0	3	108	137	−29	16	21	3	1	8	Qualification for the Challenge Cup
15	Benetton	4	0	1	3	84	92	−8	12	15	1	3	6	Qualification for the Challenge Cup
16	Zebre	4	0	0	4	79	164	−85	12	25	2	0	2	Qualification for the Challenge Cup

Updated to match(es) played on 23 October 2026. Source: UnitedRugby.com
Rules for classification: Tiebreakers for teams tied on points: 1) Number of matches won 2) The difference between points for and points against 3) The number of tries scored 4) The most points scored 5) The difference between tries for and tries against 6) The fewest red cards received 7) The fewest yellow cards received.

=== URC Irish Shield ===
Leinster have won every edition to date of the Irish Shield, and enter the competition as five-time champions.

2026–27 United Rugby Championship Regional Shield tables
(Ireland) Irish Shield
	Team	P	W	D	L	PF	PA	PD	TF	TA	TBP	LBP	Pts	Pos overall
1	(Ireland) Leinster	2	2	0	0	74	23	+51	11	3	2	0	10	3
2	(Ireland) Munster	2	0	1	1	44	50	–6	6	8	1	1	4	9
3	(Ireland) Ulster	1	0	1	0	26	26	0	4	4	1	0	3	12
4	(Ireland) Connacht	1	0	0	1	5	50	-45	1	7	0	0	0	8
If teams are level at any stage, tiebreakers are applied in the following order: 1. number of matches won 2. the difference between points for and points against 3. the number of tries scored 4. the most points scored 5. the difference between tries for and tries against 6. the fewest red cards received 7. the fewest yellow cards received
Green background indicates teams currently leading the regional shield. Upon the conclusion of the regular season, these teams win their respective regional shields. (S) : URC Shield champion

== European Rugby Champions Cup ==
The beaten finalists from the previous season, Leinster qualified for the 2026–27 European Rugby Champions Cup having finished second in the 2025–26 United Rugby Championship. The pool stage draw will take place on 1 July 2026.

Victory in the 2026 United Rugby Championship Grand Final earned Leinster one of the four top seedings, along with the 2026 Champions Cup winner's, and the winners of the English Premiership and French Top 14 competitions. In 1 July, Leinster were drawn with URC colleagues Glasgow Warrirors, who by the rules of the competition they will not face, and English sides Sale Sharks and Leicester Tigers, and French teams Pau and Clermont.

=== Pool stage ===
European Rugby Champions Cup Pool 1
Pos	Team	Pld	W	D	L	PF	PA	PD	TF	TA	TB	LB	Pts	Qualification
1	(Ireland) Leinster	1	1	0	0	48	23	+25	7	2	1	0	5	Champions Cup round of 16.
2	(France) Pau	1	1	0	0	41	17	+24	5	2	1	0	5	Champions Cup round of 16.
3	(Scotland) Glasgow Warriors	1	1	0	0	47	27	+20	7	4	1	0	5	Champions Cup round of 16.
4	(England) Sale Sharks	1	0	0	1	27	47	−20	4	7	0	0	0	Champions Cup or Challenge Cup round of 16 based on table points amongst non-top-three teams.
5	(England) Leicester Tigers	1	0	0	1	17	41	−24	2	5	0	0	0	Champions Cup or Challenge Cup round of 16 based on table points amongst non-top-three teams.
6	(France) Clermont	1	0	0	1	23	48	−25	2	7	0	0	0	Champions Cup or Challenge Cup round of 16 based on table points amongst non-top-three teams.

Updated to match(es) played on 18 October 2026. Source: EPCR
Rules for classification: Tiebreakers for teams tied on points: 1) Number of matches won; 2) Difference between points for and against; 3) Total number of points for; 4) Aggregate number of points scored in matches between tied teams; 5) Number of matches won excluding the first match, then the second and so on until the tie is settled.

17 October 2026	Clermont (France)	23–48	(Ireland) Leinster (1 BP)	Stade Marcel-Michelin, Clermont
16:15	Try: Jurand 33' c Belaubre 65' c Con: Plummer (2/2) 34', 65'); Pen: Plummer (3/3) 14', 16', 40'; Cards: Zahouany (yellow card) 56'	Report	Try: Furlong 10' c Sheehan (2) 28' m, 61' c Penalty try 58'; Prendergast 42' c Conan 66' c O'Brien 77' c Con: Prendergast (4/6) 11', 43', 62', 66'; Pen: Prendergast (1/1) 36'; Cards: McCarthy (yellow card) 80'	Attendance: 17,521; Referee: Matthew Carley (England)

12 December 2026	Leinster (Ireland)	v	(England) Sale Sharks	Laya Arena, Dublin
17:30

9 January 2027	Leinster (Ireland)	v	(France) Pau	Laya Arena, Dublin
17:30

16 January 2027	Leicester Tigers (England)	v	(Ireland) Leinster	Mattioli Woods Welford Road, Leicester
20:00
