= 2026–27 Lions (United Rugby Championship) season =

Lions (Johannesburg)
- 2026–27 season
- Head coach: Ivan van Rooyen

The 2026–27 season is Lions's sixth season in the United Rugby Championship, and in all formats of the competition. Along with competing in the URC and its South African Shield competition, the club will also participated in the 2026–27 European Rugby Champions Cup.

Lions will enter the URC South African Shield competition as champions for the first time.

== Transfers ==
=== Players in ===
- (South Africa) Boan Venter from (Scotland) Edinburgh
- (South Africa) Hyron Andrews from (England) Sale Sharks
- (South Africa) Boeta Chamberlain from (England) Newcastle Red Bulls
- (Democratic Republic of the Congo) Daniel Kasende from (Wales) Ospreys
- (South Africa) Asad Moos from (South Africa) Stormers
- (South Africa) Sikhumbuzo Notshe from (France) Montauban
- (South Africa) JP du Preez from (Japan) Red Hurricanes Osaka
- (South Africa) Eddie Davids from (South Africa) Griquas
- (South Africa) Tiaan Lange from (South Africa) Griquas (season-long loan)

=== Players out ===
- (South Africa) Gianni Lombard to (South Africa) Sharks
- (South Africa) Asenathi Ntlabakanye (suspended)
- (South Africa) Corné Weilbach to (England) Saracens
- (South Africa) Franco Marais (retired)
- (South Africa) Lubabalo Dobela to (France) Narbonne
- (South Africa) Ruben Schoeman to (France) Narbonne
- (South Africa) Johnré Stopforth to (South Africa) Boland Cavaliers
- (Zimbabwe) Darrien Landsberg to (South Africa) Sharks
- (Zimbabwe) Tapiwa Mafura (released)
- (South Africa) Heiko Pohlmann to (South Africa) Boland Cavaliers
- (South Africa) WJ Steenkamp (released)
- (South Africa) Haashim Pead to (South Africa) Stormers
- (South Africa) Stian de Bruyn (released)
- (South Africa) Izan Esterhuizen (released)
- (South Africa) JT Kapank returned to (South Africa) UJ Rugby
- (South Africa) Eduan Keyter (released)
- (South Africa) Mannie Rass (released)

== United Rugby Championship ==
=== Matches ===
Lions will begin its sixth URC campaign against Irish side Leinster.

26 September	Lions (South Africa)	27–26	(Ireland) Leinster (2 BP)	Ellis Park Stadium, Jo'burg
	Try: Cronjé (2) 9' c, 24' c Mpeku 79' c Con: Smith (3/3) 9', 25', 80'; Pen: Smith (2) 13', 61'; Cards: Kotze (yellow card) 80+3'	Report; Scorecard; Highlights	Try: Gunne (3) 6' m, 14' c, 39' c Smyth 85' c Con: Gabriel (2/3) 15', 40'; Byrne (1/1) 86'; Cards: McNeice (yellow card) 72'	Attendance: 4,613; Referee: Ben Breakspear (Wales)

3 October	(1 BP) Lions (South Africa)	35–19	(Wales) Ospreys	Ellis Park Stadium, Jo'burg
	Try: Cronje 28' c Botha 43' m Brandon 49' m Chamberlain 57' m Mpeku (2) 63' m, 66' m Con: C Smith (1/6) 28'; Pen: C Smith (1) 11'	Report; Scorecard; Highlights	Try: Williams 34' c Daniel 42' m Moriarty 82' c Con: Edwards (2/3) 35', 83'; Cards: Edwards (yellow card) 61'	Attendance: 3,426; Referee: Filippo Russo (Italy)

10 October	(1 BP) Bulls (South Africa)	57–15	(South Africa) Lions	Loftus Versfeld, Pretoria
	Try: Vorster 10' m Grobbelaar 26' c Hanekom (2) 30' c, 35' m Rudolph 40' c Moodie 44' m van Heerden 68' c Jooste 74' c de Klerk 80' c Con: Bosch (3/6) 26', 30', 41'; Pollard (3/3) 69', 75', 81'	Report; Scorecard; Highlights	Try: Qoma 18' c Brandon 50' m Con: C Smith 19' c Pen: C Smith 33'; Cards: Morne van den Berg (yellow card) 26'	Attendance: 11,307; Referee: Hanru van Rooyen (South Africa)

23 October	(1 BP) Edinburgh (Scotland)	31–10	(South Africa) Lions	Edinburgh Rugby Stadium
	Try: Currie 20' m Tuipulotu 47' c Patterson (2) 51' c, 65' m Gwynn 74' c Con: Grayson (2/4) 48', 52'; Scott (1/1) 75'	Report; Scorecard; Highlights	Try: Hlekani 57' c Con: C Smith (1/1) 58'; Pen: C Smith 34'	Attendance: 6,377; Referee: Peter Martin (Ireland)

30 October	(1 BP) Glasgow Warriors (Scotland)	29–20	(South Africa) Lions	Scotstoun Stadium
	Try: Watson 10' c Lancaster 29' c Singleton 35' m Smith 76' c Con: Horne (3/4) 11', 30', 77'; Pen: Horne 82'	Report; Scorecard; Highlights	Try: van den Berg 50' c Mahashe 65' m Brandon 70' m Con: Chamberlain (1/3) 51'; Pen: C Smith 14'; Cards: Oosthuizen (yellow card) 28'	Attendance: 7,321; Referee: Andrea Piardi (Italy)

5 December 2026	Lions (South Africa)	v	(South Africa) Bulls	Ellis Park Stadium, Johannesburg

19 December 2026	Stormers (South Africa)	v	(South Africa) Lions	Cape Town Stadium

2 January 2027	Sharks (South Africa)	v	(South Africa) Lions	Kings Park Stadium, Durban

23 January 2027	Lions (South Africa)	v	(Italy) Zebre Parma	Ellis Park Stadium, Johannesburg

30 January 2027	Lions (South Africa)	v	(Wales) Cardiff	Ellis Park Stadium, Johannesburg

20 February 2027	Lions (South Africa)	v	(South Africa) Sharks	Ellis Park Stadium, Johannesburg

27 February 2027	Lions (South Africa)	v	(South Africa) Stormers	Ellis Park Stadium, Johannesburg

20 March 2027	Scarlets (Wales)	v	(South Africa) Lions	Parc y Scarlets, Llanelli

27 March 2027	Connacht (Ireland)	v	(South Africa) Lions	The Sportsground, Galway

17 April 2027	Lions (South Africa)	v	(Ireland) Munster	Ellis Park Stadium, Johannesburg

24 April 2027	Lions (South Africa)	v	(Italy) Benetton	Ellis Park Stadium, Johannesburg

7 May 2027	Dragons (Wales)	v	(South Africa) Lions	Rodney Parade, Newport

14 May 2027	Ulster (Ireland)	v	(South Africa) Lions	Ravenhill Stadium, Belfast

=== Standings ===
Pos	Team	Pld	W	D	L	PF	PA	PD	TF	TA	TB	LB	Pts	Qualification
1	Glasgow Warriors	5	4	1	0	148	112	+36	22	15	5	0	23	Qualification for the Champions Cup and knockout stage
2	Edinburgh	4	4	0	0	111	64	+47	15	8	3	0	19	Qualification for the Champions Cup and knockout stage
3	Leinster	5	3	0	2	149	81	+68	23	11	4	2	18	Qualification for the Champions Cup and knockout stage
4	Bulls	4	3	0	1	160	90	+70	23	11	3	1	16	Qualification for the Champions Cup and knockout stage
5	Stormers	4	3	0	1	133	94	+39	19	13	3	1	16	Qualification for the Champions Cup and knockout stage
6	Sharks	4	3	0	1	125	104	+21	18	16	3	0	15	Qualification for the Champions Cup and knockout stage
7	Ospreys	4	2	0	2	112	121	−9	18	17	3	0	11	Qualification for the Champions Cup and knockout stage
8	Connacht	5	2	0	3	109	161	−52	18	24	2	0	10	Qualification for the Champions Cup and knockout stage
9	Munster	4	1	1	2	90	98	−8	12	15	2	2	10	Qualification for the Challenge Cup
10	Cardiff	4	2	0	2	87	107	−20	13	17	1	0	9	Qualification for the Challenge Cup
11	Lions	5	2	0	3	107	162	−55	15	25	1	0	9	Qualification for the Challenge Cup
12	Ulster	4	0	2	2	114	127	−13	17	17	4	1	9	Qualification for the Challenge Cup
13	Dragons	4	1	1	2	102	114	−12	15	18	2	1	9	Qualification for the Challenge Cup
14	Scarlets	4	1	0	3	108	137	−29	16	21	3	1	8	Qualification for the Challenge Cup
15	Benetton	4	0	1	3	84	92	−8	12	15	1	3	6	Qualification for the Challenge Cup
16	Zebre	4	0	0	4	79	164	−85	12	25	2	0	2	Qualification for the Challenge Cup

Updated to match(es) played on 23 October 2026. Source: UnitedRugby.com
Rules for classification: Tiebreakers for teams tied on points: 1) Number of matches won 2) The difference between points for and points against 3) The number of tries scored 4) The most points scored 5) The difference between tries for and tries against 6) The fewest red cards received 7) The fewest yellow cards received.

=== URC South African Shield ===
Lions enter the South African Shield as champions, having won the competition for the first time in 2025–26.

2026–27 United Rugby Championship Regional Shield tables
(South Africa) South African Shield
	Team	P	W	D	L	PF	PA	PD	TF	TA	TBP	LBP	Pts	Pos overall
1	(South Africa) Bulls	1	1	0	0	57	15	+42	9	2	1	0	5	3
2	(South Africa) Stormers	1	1	0	0	39	22	+17	6	3	1	0	5	4
3	(South Africa) Sharks	1	0	0	1	22	39	–17	3	6	0	0	0	6
4	(South Africa) Lions	1	0	0	1	15	57	–42	2	9	0	0	0	7
If teams are level at any stage, tiebreakers are applied in the following order: 1. number of matches won 2. the difference between points for and points against 3. the number of tries scored 4. the most points scored 5. the difference between tries for and tries against 6. the fewest red cards received 7. the fewest yellow cards received
Green background indicates teams currently leading the regional shield. Upon the conclusion of the regular season, these teams win their respective regional shields. (S) : URC Shield champion

== European Rugby Champions Cup ==
Having finished seventh in the 2025–26 United Rugby Championship, Lions qualified for the 2026–27 European Rugby Champions Cup. The pool stage draw will take place on 1 July 2026.
