= Andrew Hore (disambiguation) =

Andrew Hore (born 1978) is a former New Zealand rugby union player.

Andrew Hore may also refer to:

- Andrew Hore (cricketer) (born 1969), New Zealand cricketer
- Andrew Hore (rugby union administrator) (born 1972), New Zealand rugby union administrator
