= 2026–27 Sharks (rugby union) season =

Sharks
- 2026–27 season
- Director of rugby: Neil Powell
- Head coach: John Plumtree

The 2026–27 season is Sharks' sixth season in the United Rugby Championship, and in all formats of the competition. Along with competing in the URC and its Shield competition, the club will also participated in the 2026–27 EPCR Challenge Cup.

== Squad and management ==
=== First team coaching staff ===
Name	Title
(Namibia) Neil Powell	Director of Rugby
(New Zealand) John Plumtree	Head coach
(South Africa) Joey Mongalo	Defence coach
(South Africa) Dave Williams	Attack coach
(South Africa) Warren Whiteley	Forwards coach
(South Africa) Philip Lemmer	Forwards coach
(South Africa) Phiwe Nomlomo	Kicking and exits

=== Players in ===
- (South Africa) Thomas du Toit from (England) Bath
- (South Africa) Stephan Lewies from (England) Harlequins
- (South Africa) Nemo Roelofse from (France) Perpignan
- (South Africa) Gianni Lombard from (South Africa) Lions
- (South Africa) Ivan van Zyl from (England) Saracens
- Donavan Don from South Africa Sevens
- (South Africa) Murray Koster from (Japan) Hino Red Dolphins
- (South Africa) Esethu Mnebelele from (South Africa) Bulls
- (South Africa) Hendré Stassen from (France) Brive
- (Zimbabwe) Darrien Landsberg from (South Africa) Lions
- (New Zealand) Ma'a Nonu from (France) Toulon
- (South Africa) Suleiman Hartzenberg from (South Africa) Stormers

=== Players out ===
- (South Africa) Siya Kolisi to (South Africa) Stormers
- (Italy) Jean Smith to (Italy) Benetton
- (Namibia) Le Roux Malan to (Wales) Cardiff
- (South Africa) Hakeem Kunene to (South Africa) Bulls
- (South Africa) Mawande Mdanda to (South Africa) Bulls
- (South Africa) Marvin Orie (released)
- (South Africa) Grant Williams to (Japan) Kobelco Kobe Steelers
- (South Africa) Aphelele Fassi to (Japan) Toshiba Brave Lupus
- (South Africa) Francois Venter (retired)
- (South Africa) Diego Appollis (released)
- (South Africa) Ruan Dreyer (released)
- (South Africa) Bongi Mbonambi to (South Africa) Stormers
- Marnus Potgieter to South Africa Sevens

== United Rugby Championship ==
=== Matches ===
Sharks will begin their sixth URC campaign at home against Welsh side Ospreys.

26 September	(1 BP) Sharks (South Africa)	41–24	(Wales) Ospreys (1 BP)	Kings Park Stadium, Durban
	Try: Hatton 12' c Tshituka 22' c Giliomee (2) 28' c, 67' c Bester 37' c Con: Moyo (4/4) 13', 23', 29', 38'; Masuka (1/1) 68'; Pen: Moyo (2) 53', 56'	Report; Scorecard; Highlights	Try: Morgan 32' c Parry 45' m Wright 45' c Hopkins 71' m Con: Creighton (2/4) 33', 46'	Attendance: 11,330; Referee: Gianluca Gnecci (Italy)

3 October	(1 BP) Sharks (South Africa)	26–20	(Ireland) Leinster (1 BP)	Kings Park Stadium, Durban
	Try: Tshituka 26' c Bester 41' c Esterhuizen 69' c E van der Merwe 78' m Con: Moyo (3/4) 27', 42', 70'	Report; Scorecard; Highlights	Try: Henshaw 17' c Clarkson 49' m A Osborne 81' m Con: Gabriel (1/2) 18'; Pen: Prendergast (1) 66'; Cards: Clarkson (yellow card) 38'	Attendance: 19,044; Referee: Craig Evans (Wales)

10 October	(1 BP) Stormers (South Africa)	39–22	(South Africa) Sharks	Cape Town Stadium
	Try: Senatla 6'; Dayimani (2) 37' c, 47' c Zas 41' m Venter 43' c Kotze 64' m Con: Feinberg-Mngomezulu (3/6) 38', 44', 48'; Pen: Feinberg-Mngomezulu 13'	Report; Scorecard; Highlights	Try: Tshituka 15' m Romao 51' c Buthelezi 57' c Con: Lombard (2/3) 52', 58'; Pen: Lombard 31'; Cards: Romoa (yellow card) 36'; Tshituka (yellow card) 43'	Attendance: 42,368; Referee: Morné Ferreira (South Africa)

23 October	Cardiff (Wales)	21–36	(South Africa) Sharks (1 BP)	Cardiff Arms Park
	Try: Adams 10' c Botham (2) 45' c, 58' c Con: Evans (3/3) 11', 46', 59'	Report; Scorecard; Highlights	Try: Hooker 2' m Romao (2) 25' c, 80' m Jenkins 43' m du Toit 62' c Bester 74' c Con: Lombard (2/4) 27', 63'; Masuka (1/2) 75'	Attendance: 8,076; Referee: Andrea Piardi (Italy)

31 October 2026	Munster (Ireland)	v	(South Africa) Sharks	Thomond Park, Limerick

5 December 2026	Sharks (South Africa)	v	(South Africa) Stormers	Kings Park Stadium, Durban

19 December 2026	Sharks (South Africa)	v	(South Africa) Bulls	Kings Park Stadium, Durban

2 January 2027	Sharks (South Africa)	v	(South Africa) Lions	Kings Park Stadium, Durban

22 January 2027	Ulster (Ireland)	v	(South Africa) Sharks	Ravenhill Stadium, Belfast

30 January 2027	Benetton (Italy)	v	(South Africa) Sharks	Stadio Monigo, Treviso

20 February 2027	Lions (South Africa)	v	(South Africa) Sharks	Ellis Park Stadium, Jo'burg

27 February 2027	Bulls (South Africa)	v	(South Africa) Sharks	Loftus Versfeld, Pretoria

19 March 2027	Sharks (South Africa)	v	(Scotland) Edinburgh	Kings Park Stadium, Durban

27 March 2027	Sharks (South Africa)	v	(Wales) Dragons	Kings Park Stadium, Durban

17 April 2027	Zebre Parma (Italy)	v	(South Africa) Sharks	Stadio Sergio Lanfranchi

24 April 2027	Scarlets (Wales)	v	(South Africa) Sharks	Parc y Scarlets, Llanelli

8 May 2027	Sharks (South Africa)	v	(Ireland) Connacht	Kings Park Stadium, Durban

15 May 2027	Sharks (South Africa)	v	(Scotland) Glasgow Warriors	Kings Park Stadium, Durban

=== Standings ===
Pos	Team	Pld	W	D	L	PF	PA	PD	TF	TA	TB	LB	Pts	Qualification
1	Glasgow Warriors	5	4	1	0	148	112	+36	22	15	5	0	23	Qualification for the Champions Cup and knockout stage
2	Edinburgh	4	4	0	0	111	64	+47	15	8	3	0	19	Qualification for the Champions Cup and knockout stage
3	Leinster	5	3	0	2	149	81	+68	23	11	4	2	18	Qualification for the Champions Cup and knockout stage
4	Bulls	4	3	0	1	160	90	+70	23	11	3	1	16	Qualification for the Champions Cup and knockout stage
5	Stormers	4	3	0	1	133	94	+39	19	13	3	1	16	Qualification for the Champions Cup and knockout stage
6	Sharks	4	3	0	1	125	104	+21	18	16	3	0	15	Qualification for the Champions Cup and knockout stage
7	Ospreys	4	2	0	2	112	121	−9	18	17	3	0	11	Qualification for the Champions Cup and knockout stage
8	Connacht	5	2	0	3	109	161	−52	18	24	2	0	10	Qualification for the Champions Cup and knockout stage
9	Munster	4	1	1	2	90	98	−8	12	15	2	2	10	Qualification for the Challenge Cup
10	Cardiff	4	2	0	2	87	107	−20	13	17	1	0	9	Qualification for the Challenge Cup
11	Lions	5	2	0	3	107	162	−55	15	25	1	0	9	Qualification for the Challenge Cup
12	Ulster	4	0	2	2	114	127	−13	17	17	4	1	9	Qualification for the Challenge Cup
13	Dragons	4	1	1	2	102	114	−12	15	18	2	1	9	Qualification for the Challenge Cup
14	Scarlets	4	1	0	3	108	137	−29	16	21	3	1	8	Qualification for the Challenge Cup
15	Benetton	4	0	1	3	84	92	−8	12	15	1	3	6	Qualification for the Challenge Cup
16	Zebre	4	0	0	4	79	164	−85	12	25	2	0	2	Qualification for the Challenge Cup

Updated to match(es) played on 23 October 2026. Source: UnitedRugby.com
Rules for classification: Tiebreakers for teams tied on points: 1) Number of matches won 2) The difference between points for and points against 3) The number of tries scored 4) The most points scored 5) The difference between tries for and tries against 6) The fewest red cards received 7) The fewest yellow cards received.

=== URC South African Shield ===
2026–27 United Rugby Championship Regional Shield tables
(South Africa) South African Shield
	Team	P	W	D	L	PF	PA	PD	TF	TA	TBP	LBP	Pts	Pos overall
1	(South Africa) Bulls	1	1	0	0	57	15	+42	9	2	1	0	5	3
2	(South Africa) Stormers	1	1	0	0	39	22	+17	6	3	1	0	5	4
3	(South Africa) Sharks	1	0	0	1	22	39	–17	3	6	0	0	0	6
4	(South Africa) Lions	1	0	0	1	15	57	–42	2	9	0	0	0	7
If teams are level at any stage, tiebreakers are applied in the following order: 1. number of matches won 2. the difference between points for and points against 3. the number of tries scored 4. the most points scored 5. the difference between tries for and tries against 6. the fewest red cards received 7. the fewest yellow cards received
Green background indicates teams currently leading the regional shield. Upon the conclusion of the regular season, these teams win their respective regional shields. (S) : URC Shield champion

== EPCR Challenge Cup ==
Having finished outside the top eight of the 2025–26 United Rugby Championship, Sharks qualified for the 2026–27 EPCR Challenge Cup. The pool stage draw will take place on 1 July 2026.
