= Ospreys (rugby union) =

Welsh rugby union team, based in Swansea

- Union: Welsh Rugby Union
- Founded: 2003; 23 years ago
- Location: Swansea, Wales
- Ground(s): Brewery Field (2025-2026); St Helens Rugby and Cricket Ground (2026–) c.8000 (expected) (Capacity: 8,000)
- CEO: Brian Robson
- Coach: Mark Jones
- Captain(s): Sam Parry; Owen Watkin
- Most appearances: Alun Wyn Jones (268)
- Top scorer: Dan Biggar (2,203)
- Most tries: Shane Williams (57)
- League: United Rugby Championship
- 2025–26: 11th (Welsh Shield: 1st)
1st kit	2nd kit

Official website
- www.ospreysrugby.com
- Current season

The Ospreys (Welsh: Y Gweilch), formerly the Neath–Swansea Ospreys is one of the four professional men's rugby union teams from Wales. They compete in the United Rugby Championship and in European Professional Club Rugby competitions. The team formed as a result of Neath RFC and Swansea RFC combining to create a new merged entity, as part of the new regional structure of Welsh rugby, that began in 2003. They are also affiliated with a number of local semi-professional and amateur clubs, including Welsh Premier Division sides Aberavon RFC, Bridgend Ravens, and original founding clubs Neath and Swansea. The regional area represented by the team has widely become known for rugby purposes as 'Ospreylia'.

Their main home ground is St Helen's, Swansea. The Ospreys played for 20 years at Swansea.com Stadium. Some smaller profile games have been played at the Brewery Field, Bridgend. Ospreys currently play in a black home strip, while the away strip is white. The Ospreys logo consists of an image of an Osprey mask.

The Ospreys are the most successful Welsh team in the history of the Celtic League or Pro12 tournament, having won the competition four times. They also became the first and only Welsh regional team to beat a major touring side, defeating Australia A 24–16 in 2006.

== History ==
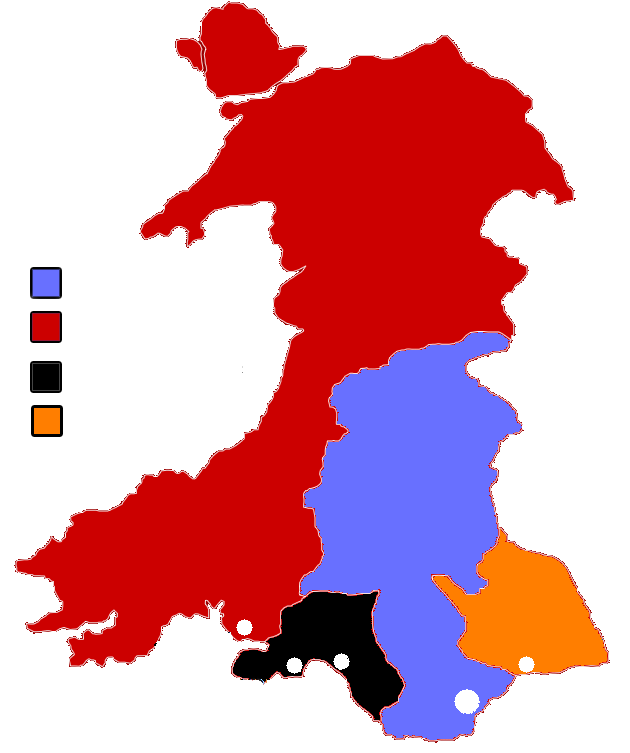
The 4 Welsh Rugby Union Regions of Wales

=== Infancy ===
In February 2003 an emergency meeting of clubs in the Welsh Rugby Union voted to change its 130 year tradition and to devolve from local RFCs to regions. On 24 July 2003, it was announced that the new team jointly representing Neath RFC and Swansea RFC would be known as the Neath–Swansea Ospreys. The Ospreys part of the team's name was inspired by the use of the bird as Swansea RFC's centenary badge. Former Neath RFC coach Lyn Jones was appointed as head coach, who named Scott Gibbs as the team's first captain. 5 September 2003 saw the region play their first competitive game, a 41–30 Celtic League home win over Irish province Ulster at The Gnoll in Neath. Gavin Henson was a substitute in that game but scored two tries and a penalty helping the team to victory. Leeds Tykes were the Ospreys' first Heineken Cup opponents, with the English team triumphing 29–20 on 7 December 2003. They struggled to recover from their opening defeat, finishing bottom of their pool, recording their only victory against the Tykes' at home in the final round at St. Helens. Domestically the Ospreys' did salvage some pride, avoiding becoming the lowest placed Welsh region, by pipping Cardiff Blues to fifth place in the Celtic League.

Following the demise of the Celtic Warriors region on 1 June 2004, the Neath–Swansea Ospreys had their borders extended to cover much of the Bridgend and Ogmore areas to the east. However, for logistical reasons it was decided that no home games would be played at Bridgend RFC's Brewery Field. Former Warriors players David Bishop, Brent Cockbain, Ryan Jones and Sonny Parker were signed by the Ospreys'.

=== 2004–2007 ===
The 2004–05 season saw significant on field improvement for the region. A capacity crowd of 10,280 was present at The Gnoll on 26 March 2005 to witness the Ospreys claim their first piece of silverware. A 29–12 win over Edinburgh, with two rounds of the competition still remaining, saw the team crowned Celtic League champions. However, impressive back to back wins over Harlequins were not enough to overcome Munster in the pool stages of that season's Heineken Cup. On 14 May 2005 it was announced that the "Neath–Swansea" part of the team's name would be dropped, with them to be referred to as the Ospreys.

A growing sense of expectation surrounded the team heading into 2005–06, an expectation they struggled to cope with, finishing a disappointing seventh in the Celtic League. A difficult Heineken Cup pool made up of tough opposition in Leicester Tigers, Stade Français Paris and ASM Clermont Auvergne proved too difficult, as they finished a distant third. A gutsy home victory over Stade and a last gasp defeat to Leicester, did however offer some crumbs of comfort. In April 2006 it was announced that noted former New Zealand All Blacks scrum half Justin Marshall had signed to play for Ospreys.

The Ospreys won the Celtic League during the 2006/07 season, topping the league by a single point and taking the title with an away win at Borders. Winning the Celtic League for a second time meant the Ospreys were the first team to have won the Celtic League twice. In February 2008, the Ospreys provided 13 of the starting line-up for Wales in their Six Nations match against England, setting a new record for the number of players from one region playing for their national side. During the 2007/08 season the Ospreys reached Quarter-final of the Heineken Cup for the first time but unexpectedly lost to Saracens. The following week they won the EDF Energy Cup beating Leicester Tigers at Twickenham.

In November 2006 when it became apparent that Wales 'A' would not be able to face Australia A national rugby union team midweek during their November tour, the Ospreys became the first Welsh region to play a major international side since regional rugby was introduced, a match they won 24–16. Following the win over the Wallabies, the term Ospreylia became ingrained in popular culture with it being adopted by the region and its supporters as a description of the geographical area covered by the region, with supporters known as Ospreylians. Peter Black, Assembly Member for south west Wales has declared himself as AM for Ospreylia on his own blog.

On 23 February 2007, the Ospreys played their first 'A' team match, against Newport-Gwent Dragons 'A' at Bridgend, which was the first 'A' match fixture for any of the Welsh regional sides. They lost the match 22–10. They have since gone on to play Worcester 'A' in April, a game which they lost 24–23 to an injury-time penalty.

=== 2008–2011 ===
In February 2008 Andrew Hore was appointed as the Ospreys as elite performance director. Previously Hore had been high performance manager with the New Zealand Rugby Union.

A disappointing seventh-place finish in the Celtic League and a surprise Heineken Cup quarter-final exit to Saracens F.C. saw head coach Lyn Jones resign at the end of the 2007–08 season, on 16 May 2008 Assistant Coach Sean Holley and forwards coach Jonathan Humphreys would continue as part of a new management structure being overseen by Andrew Hore, until a replacement could be found. Scott Johnson, the former head coach of the Welsh national team, and attack coach when Wales won the Six Nations Championship Grand Slam in 2005 for the first time in 27 years, was announced as director of coaching at the Ospreys on 29 January 2009.

On 21 April 2009, the Ospreys had six players included in the British & Irish Lions' squad for the 2009 South African tour: Lee Byrne (fullback), Tommy Bowe and Shane Williams (wings), Mike Phillips (scrum-half), Alun Wyn Jones (lock) and Adam Jones (prop). One notable omission however, was Wales and Ospreys captain Ryan Jones. The Ospreys announced the signing of former New Zealand All Blacks captain Jerry Collins on 9 May 2009. Collins had been a stalwart for the All Blacks, since 2004 but retired from international rugby in 2008.

A 29–28 defeat by Biarritz on 10 April 2010 dashed the team's hopes of a first Heineken Cup semi-final appearance. A late Nicky Walker try in San Sebastien proved in vain. However, on 29 May 2010, the Ospreys won the 2009–10 Celtic League by defeating Leinster in the final by 17–12 at the RDS Arena in Dublin.

Following a wide-ranging review, Andrew Hore, previously elite performance director at the Ospreys, became on 26 April 2011 chief operations officer at the region.

2010–11 would not see the region reach the heights of the previous one. Despite winning all their home pool games in the Heineken Cup, a failure to win on the road proved costly, with Munster and Toulon progressing instead. Another win for Munster at Thomond Park on 14 May 2011, ended the Ospreys Celtic League aspirations at the semi-final stage.

=== 2012–2018 ===
Former player Steve Tandy was appointed as new Ospreys head coach on 15 February 2012 replacing Sean Holley in the role, as Scott Johnson also departed to take up a coaching role with Scotland. Both Holley and Johnson's final game as part of the coaching setup at the Liberty Stadium had been a 36–5 away loss to Biarritz, which marked the end of a Heineken Cup campaign that saw them again fail to win on their travels. New coach Tandy enjoyed a successful start to his tenure, winning eight of his first ten matches as full-time Head Coach, including winning the 2011–12 Pro12 following a 31–30 win over Leinster at the RDS, thanks to a late Shane Williams try in his final match for the region 29–30 and Dan Biggar adding a difficult conversion for the win 31–30. Ospreys reached 2 semi-finals in the subsequent 6 seasons, but not made the final.

Following a poor start to the 2017–2018 season, Tandy was sacked by the Ospreys. Forwards coach Allen Clarke took over on an interim basis, before agreeing to a three-year deal as head coach.

=== 2018– ===
For the 2018–2019 season, along with new head coach Clarke, Matt Sherratt joined the coaching staff, replacing Gruff Rees. The season also began with notable squad changes, with record points scorer Dan Biggar departing for Northampton Saints, and stalwart Paul James retiring. The Ospreys were boosted with the signings of Welsh internationals George North, Scott Williams, and Aled Davies. The season saw a modest improvement for the Ospreys, winning 12 matches and losing 9, as well as beating west Wales rivals the Scarlets for a Champions Cup place. The Ospreys endured an inauspicious 2019–2020 season, finishing bottom of Conference A of the Pro14, winning just two of their 15 matches.

The 2020–2021 season saw Allen Clarke replaced by former electrician Toby Booth. He succeeded in sparking the region back to life, including an away win at eventual champions Leinster and a return to top tier European competition for the following season. In 2021–2022, the rebranded United Rugby Championship saw the Ospreys win the Welsh Shield, but struggle in the Champions Cup, losing all of their group games. They also narrowly missed out on the league play-offs, coming in ninth position. A home win over Munster heralded the arrival of outstanding back row forward Jac Morgan.

The 2022–2023 season once again saw a mid-table finish in the United Rugby Championship. The Ospreys' European Champions Cup campaign started in ominous fashion, as a much-changed Leicester team defeated them at the Swansea.com stadium. As one of the lowest-seeded teams in the competition, the Ospreys would have to play the reigning English and French champions home and away in their group games. The defeat against Leicester was therefore followed by an away game in Montpellier. Against all expectations, and inspired by the arrival of master-tactician fly-half Owen Williams after the break-up of Worcester Warriors, the Ospreys beat Montpellier. That was followed by a win over Montpellier at home, and a titanic victory away at Leicester, which secured their place in the round of 16. Results elsewhere meant that they missed out on home advantage, and were ultimately not able to get past Saracens, bowing out of the competition at the round of 16 stage, but not without achieving some of the best results in Welsh regional rugby in years along the way.

In January 2024, the Ospreys management have stated they are looking at options for moving to a new ground. It will be a rugby home, suited to rugby supporters and not a shared football stadium like the Swansea.com.

== Season records ==
=== Celtic League / Pro12 / Pro14 / URC ===
Season	Position/Round	Played	Won	Drawn	Lost	Bonus	Points
2003–04	5th	22	11	1	10	9	55
2004–05	1st	20	16	1	3	10	76
2005–06	7th	22	11	0	9	3	55 (Note: 11 teams were involved in this season, so one team did not play each week and were awarded 4 points instead. Therefore, each team finished the season with 8 more points than the table would seem to warrant.)
2006–07	1st	20	14	0	6	8	64
2007–08	7th	18	6	1	11	11	37
2008–09	4th	18	11	0	7	8	52
2009–10	2nd	18	13	0	5	6	52
2009–10	Semi-final	Ospreys 20 – 15 Glasgow Warriors					
2009–10	Grand Final	Leinster 12 – 17 Ospreys					
2010–11	4th	22	12	1	9	13	63
2010–11	Semi-final	Munster 18 – 11 Ospreys					
2011–12	2nd	22	16	1	5	5	71
2011–12	Semi-final	Ospreys 45 – 10 Munster					
2011–12	Grand Final	Leinster 30 – 31 Ospreys					
2012–13	5th	22	14	1	7	4	62
2013–14	5th	22	13	1	8	6	66
2014–15	3rd	22	16	1	5	8	74
2014–15	Semi-final	Munster 21 – 18 Ospreys					
2015–16	8th	22	11	1	10	9	55
2016–17	4th	22	14	0	8	13	69
2016–17	Semi-final	Munster 23 – 3 Ospreys					
2017–18	Conference A, 5th	21	9	1	12	8	44
2017–18	7th Champions Cup place Playoff	Ulster 35 – 17 Ospreys					
2018–19	Conference A, 4th	21	12	0	9	10	58
2018–19	7th Champions Cup place Playoff	Ospreys 21 – 10 Scarlets					
2019–20	Conference A, 7th	15 (Note: Only 15 rounds were played during the 2019–20 season due to the COVID-19 pandemic in Europe.)	2	2	11	5	17
2020–21	Conference A, 3rd	16 (Note: Only 16 rounds were played during the 2020–21 season due to the COVID-19 pandemic in Europe, with the remaining matches replaced by the Pro14 Rainbow Cup competition.)	8	0	8	4	36
2020–21	Rainbow Cup, 8th	5	2	1	2	3	11
2021–22	9th	18	10	0	8	6	46
2022–23	13th	18	5	2	11	11	35
2023–24	8th	18	10	0	8	10	50
2023–24	Quarter-final	Munster 23 – 7 Ospreys					
2024–25	12th	18	7	1	10	10	40
2025–26	11th	18	7	2	9	7	39

=== Celtic Cup ===
Season	Round	Match
2003–04	Preliminary	Leinster 35 – 21 Neath–Swansea Ospreys
2004–05	Quarter-final	Neath–Swansea Ospreys 23 – 16 Ulster
2004–05	Semi-final	Llanelli Scarlets 23 – 15 Neath–Swansea Ospreys

=== Heineken Cup / Rugby Champions Cup ===
Season	Pool/Round	Pos	Played	Won	Drawn	Lost	Bonus	Points
2003–04	Pool 2	4th	6	1	0	5	0	4
2004–05	Pool 4	3rd	6	3	0	3	2	14
2005–06	Pool 4	3rd	6	2	0	4	1	9
2006–07	Pool 3	2nd	6	4	1	1	2	20
2007–08	Pool 2	2nd	6	5	0	1	1	21
2007–08	Quarter-final	Saracens 19 – 10 Ospreys						
2008–09	Pool 3	2nd	6	4	0	2	4	20
2008–09	Quarter-final	Munster 43 – 9 Ospreys						
2009–10	Pool 3	2nd	6	4	1	1	2	20
2009–10	Quarter-final	Biarritz Olympique 29 – 28 Ospreys						
2010–11	Pool 3	3rd	6	3	0	3	2	14
2011–12	Pool 5	3rd	6	2	1	3	3	13
2012–13	Pool 2	3rd	6	2	1	3	2	12
2013–14	Pool 1	4th	6	1	0	5	1	5
2014–15.	Pool 5	3rd	6	1	1	4	3	9
2015–16	Pool 2	3rd	6	3	0	3	4	16
2017–18	Pool 2	3rd	6	2	1	3	5	15
2019–20	Pool 4	4th	6	0	0	6	2	2
2021–22	Pool A	12th	4	0	0	4	0	0
2022–23	Pool B	5th	4	3	0	1	2	14
2022–23	Round of 16	Saracens 35 – 20 Ospreys						

=== European Challenge Cup ===
Season	Pool/Round	Pos	Played	Won	Drawn	Lost	Bonus	Points
2016–17	Pool 2	1st	6	6	0	0	6	30
2016–17	Quarter-final	Ospreys 21 – 25 Stade Français Paris						
2018–19	Pool 2	2nd	6	2	0	4	5	13
2020–21	Prelim Stage	2nd	2 (Note: Only 2 rounds of the preliminary stage were played before suspension due to new restrictions surrounding the COVID-19 pandemic in Europe. A revised format to finish the competition involving the top 8 teams from the preliminary stage and knocked out teams from the Champions Cup was played thereafter.)	2	0	0	2	10
2020–21	Round of 16	Ospreys 24 – 28 Newcastle Falcons						
2023–24	Pool 2	3rd	4	3	0	1	2	14
2023–24	Round of 16	Ospreys 23 – 15 Sale Sharks						
2023–24	Quarter-final	Gloucester 23 – 13 Ospreys						
2024–25	Pool 2	2nd	4	3	0	1	3	15
2024–25	Round of 16	Ospreys 36 – 14 Scarlets						
2024–25	Quarter-final	Ospreys 18 – 20 Lyon						
2025–26	Pool 1	4th	4	2	0	2	5	13
2025–26	Round of 16	Ulster 28 – 24 Ospreys						

=== Anglo-Welsh Cup ===
Season	Group/Round	Pos	Played	Won	Drawn	Lost	Bonus	Points
2005–06	Group A	3rd	3	1	0	2	2	6
2006–07	Group A	1st	3	3	0	0	2	14
2006–07	Semi-final	Ospreys 27 – 10 Cardiff Blues						
2006–07	Final	Leicester Tigers 41 – 35 Ospreys						
2007–08	Group C	1st	3	3	0	0	2	14
2007–08	Semi-final	Ospreys 30 – 3 Saracens						
2007–08	Final	Ospreys 23 – 6 Leicester Tigers						
2008–09	Group C	1st	3	2	0	1	2	10
2008–09	Semi-final	Gloucester 17 – 0 Ospreys						
2009–10	Pool 1	4th	4	1	0	3	1	5
2010–11	Pool 4	3rd	4	3	0	1	2	14
2011–12	Pool 1	3rd	4	1	0	3	1	5
2012–13	Pool 4	3rd	4	1	0	3	2	6
2013–14	Pool 3	2nd	4	1	0	3	2	6
2014–15	Pool 4	2nd	4	1	0	3	1	6
2016–17	Pool 2	2nd	4	3	0	1	3	15
2017–18	Pool 4	4th	4	1	0	3	0	4

== Home grounds ==
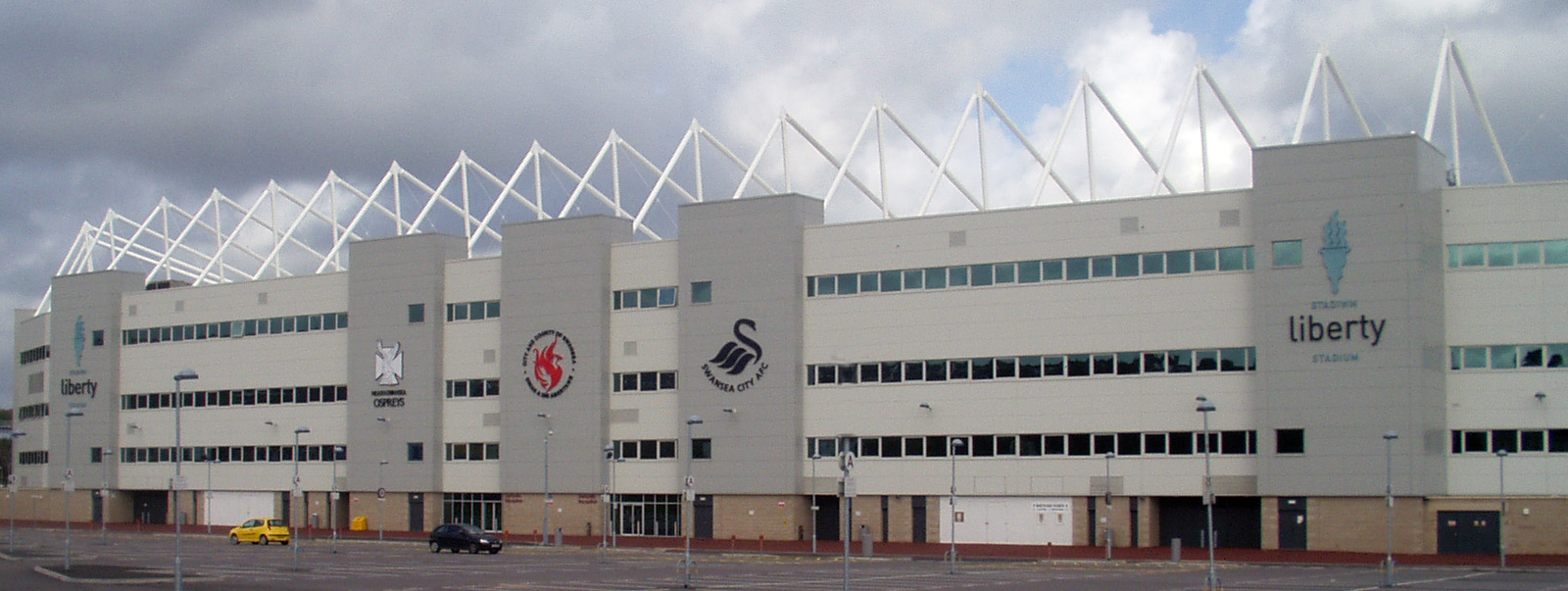
Liberty Stadium

In their first two seasons, the Ospreys shared their home games between St Helen's (home ground of Swansea RFC) and The Gnoll (home ground of Neath RFC). Since their third season in 2005–06, they have played at the purpose-built 20,000 seat Swansea.com Stadium (originally the Liberty stadium) in Landore, Swansea, which is shared with Swansea City. The Swansea.com Stadium, with double the capacity of St Helen's, has seen a capacity crowd for the matches against international tourists Australia 'A' team (1 November 2006) and against local rivals the Scarlets. On 12 November 2010 the team played their first competitive fixture at the Brewery Field home ground of Bridgend Ravens in the Anglo-Welsh Cup.

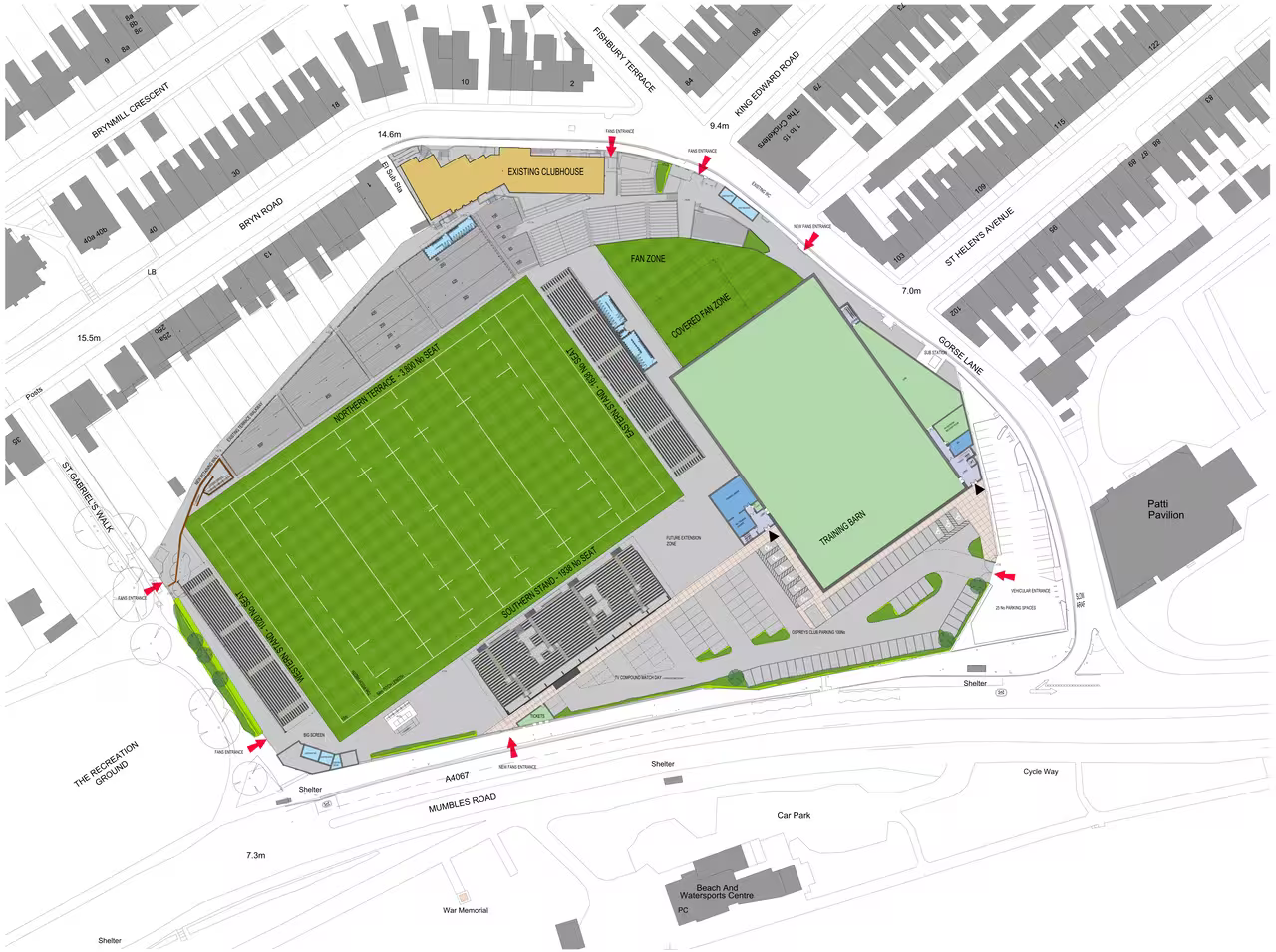
Full Phase 1 and Phase 2 plan for St Helens Rugby and Cricket Ground reconstruction

In July 2024, it was announced that the Ospreys would leave the Swansea.com Stadium after 20 years and return to play in the newly redeveloped St Helen's Rugby and Cricket Ground. As part of the reconfiguration of the ground, it was also announced that the Swansea Cricket Club would leave the home they had occupied since 1875. However, it was announced on 12 August 2025 that the Ospreys would play all of their home games at the Brewery Field for the 2025–26 season. This was done to allow redevelopment work to be completed at St Helen's, due to be completed by the start of the following season.

On 24 October 2026, the Ospreys played their first game back at St Helen's in a 31–14 win over the Dragons to a sold-out crowd.

== Kit suppliers ==
From their foundation to the 2013–14 season, the Ospreys kit suppliers were Kooga. Between the seasons 2014–2017, BLK supplied the Ospreys kits. Canterbury supplied the kits for the 2018–2021 seasons. Starting for the 2021/22 season, the Ospreys would form a kit partnership with Umbro. This lasted until 2023 as in June of the same year, the Ospreys announced that they had signed a multi-year partnership with sportswear manufacturer Macron.

== Current standings ==
Pos	Team	Pld	W	D	L	PF	PA	PD	TF	TA	TB	LB	Pts	Qualification
1	Glasgow Warriors	5	4	1	0	148	112	+36	22	15	5	0	23	Qualification for the Champions Cup and knockout stage
2	Bulls	5	4	0	1	214	106	+108	31	15	4	1	21	Qualification for the Champions Cup and knockout stage
3	Stormers	5	4	0	1	166	101	+65	24	14	4	1	21	Qualification for the Champions Cup and knockout stage
4	Sharks	5	4	0	1	140	107	+33	20	16	3	0	19	Qualification for the Champions Cup and knockout stage
5	Edinburgh	5	4	0	1	123	95	+28	17	12	3	0	19	Qualification for the Champions Cup and knockout stage
6	Leinster	5	3	0	2	149	81	+68	23	11	4	2	18	Qualification for the Champions Cup and knockout stage
7	Cardiff	5	3	0	2	113	107	+6	17	17	2	0	14	Qualification for the Champions Cup and knockout stage
8	Dragons	5	2	1	2	137	128	+9	20	20	3	1	14	Qualification for the Champions Cup and knockout stage
9	Ospreys	5	2	0	3	112	147	−35	18	21	3	0	11	Qualification for the Challenge Cup
10	Benetton	5	1	1	3	115	104	+11	16	17	2	3	11	Qualification for the Challenge Cup
11	Connacht	5	2	0	3	109	161	−52	18	24	2	0	10	Qualification for the Challenge Cup
12	Munster	5	1	1	3	93	113	−20	12	17	2	2	10	Qualification for the Challenge Cup
13	Lions	5	2	0	3	107	162	−55	15	25	1	0	9	Qualification for the Challenge Cup
14	Scarlets	5	1	0	4	134	191	−57	20	29	4	1	9	Qualification for the Challenge Cup
15	Ulster	5	0	2	3	121	160	−39	18	22	4	1	9	Qualification for the Challenge Cup
16	Zebre	5	0	0	5	93	199	−106	14	30	2	0	2	Qualification for the Challenge Cup

Updated to match(es) played on 2nd November 2026. Source: UnitedRugby.com
Rules for classification: Tiebreakers for teams tied on points: 1) Number of matches won 2) The difference between points for and points against 3) The number of tries scored 4) The most points scored 5) The difference between tries for and tries against 6) The fewest red cards received 7) The fewest yellow cards received.

== Current squad ==
2026-27 Ospreys squad
**Props**: (South Africa) Tom Botha *; (Wales) Rhys Henry; (Wales) Cameron Jones; (Wales) Garyn Phillips; (Wales) **Gareth Thomas**; (Wales) Steffan Thomas; (Wales) Louie Trevett (Note: On loan from Bristol Bears.); (Wales) **Ben Warren**; **Hookers**: (Wales) Efan Daniel; (Wales) Ethan Lewis; (Wales) Lewis Lloyd; (Wales) **Sam Parry** **(cc)**; **Locks**: (Wales) **Rhys Davies**; (Wales) Lewis Jones; (Australia) Ryan Smith; (Wales) Huw Sutton	**Back row**: (Wales) **Harri Deaves**; (Wales) **Ross Moriarty**; (Wales) Morgan Morris; (Wales) **Morgan Morse**; (Wales) **James Ratti**; (Australia) **Liam Wright**; **Scrum-halves**: (Wales) Luke Davies; (Wales) **Kieran Hardy**; (Wales) **Reuben Morgan-Williams**; (Wales) Harri Williams; **Fly-halves**: (Australia) Lawson Creighton; (Wales) **Dan Edwards**; (Wales) Harri Wilde (Note: On loan from Cardiff.)	**Centres**: (South Africa) Evardi Boshoff; (Australia) **Lalakai Foketi**; (Wales) **Owen Watkin** **(cc)**; (Wales) **Keiran Williams**; **Wings**: (Wales) **Keelan Giles**; (Wales) Harri Houston; (Australia) **Marika Koroibete**; (Wales) **Luke Morgan**; **Fullbacks**: (Wales) Iestyn Hopkins; (Wales) Dan John; (Wales) **Tom Rogers**
(cc) denotes co-captain. **Bold** denotes internationally capped players. * denotes players qualified to play for Wales on residency or dual nationality. Taking into account signings and departures ahead of 2026-27 season as listed on List of 2026-27 United Rugby Championship transfers. Source:

=== Development Squad ===
2026-27 Ospreys Development squad
**Props**: (Wales) Kian Hire; (Wales) Math Iorwerth-Scott; (Wales) Dylan James; (Wales) Osian Oliver; (Wales) Mckenzie Scales; **Locks**: (Wales) Cody-Rae David; (Wales) Ben Roberts	**Back row**: (Wales) Elis Cox; (Wales) Gwilym Evans; (Wales) Zac Evans; (Wales) Sam Morgan; **Scrum-halves**: (Wales) Nick Fisk-Jones; **Fly-halves**: (Wales) Jack Hoskins; (Wales) Steff Jac Jones	**Centres**: (Wales) Ethan Bolche; (England) Will Hepher *; (Wales) Fraser Jones; **Fullbacks**: (Wales) Lewis Edwards; (Wales) Ben Evans
**(c)** denotes the team captain. **Bold** denotes internationally capped players. * denotes players qualified to play for Wales on residency or dual nationality. Taking into account signings and departures ahead of 2026-27 season as listed on List of 2026-27 United Rugby Championship transfers. Source:

== Management & Coaching staff ==
Management

Position	Name	Nationality
Owner	James Davies-Yandle	Wales
CEO	Lance Bradley	England
Director	Roger Blyth	Wales

Coaching

Position	Name	Nationality
Rugby General Manager	Dan Griffiths	Wales
Development Director	Mike Ruddock	Wales
Development Pathway Manager	Gareth Walters	Wales
Head coach	Mark Jones	Wales
First Team Coach	Duncan Jones	Wales
Skills coach	Richard Fussell	Wales
Academy Skills coach	Andrew Bishop	Wales
Academy Skills coach	James Hook	Wales
Team Logistics Manager	Dai Davies	Wales
Head of Physical Performance	Simon Church	Wales
Lead Strength & Conditioning Coach	Alex Lawson	Wales
Strength & Conditioning Coach	Josh Robinson	Wales
Strength & Conditioning Coach	Liam Thomas	Wales
Medical Performance Manager	Chris Towers	Wales
Physiotherapist	Matthew Bowen	Wales
Physiotherapist	Gavin Daglish	Wales
Lead Doctor	Simon Davies	Wales
Head Analyst	Aled Griffiths	Wales
Analyst	Dan Hiscocks	Wales
Analyst	Callum Nibblet	Wales
Kit Custodian	Shaun McAuliffe	Wales
Admin Assistant/Travel Coordinator	Lyn Jones	Wales
Sports Psychologist	Steve Mellalieu	Wales
Graduate Sports Therapist	Dan Maru	Wales

== Notable players & coaches ==
=== Welsh Internationals ===
The following players have represented Wales internationally and represented the Ospreys. The years in brackets represent the years they played internationally, not necessarily for the Ospreys.

- Cory Allen: (2013–2017)
- Gareth Anscombe: (2015–2025)
- Dan Baker: (2013–2015)
- Scott Baldwin: (2013–2023)
- James Bater: (2003)
- Adam Beard: (2017–)
- Ashley Beck: (2012–2013)
- Huw Bennett: (2003–2012)
- Ryan Bevington: (2011–2014)
- Dan Biggar: (2008–2023)
- Andrew Bishop: (2008–2012)
- Aled Brew: (2007–2012)
- Lee Byrne: (2005–2011)
- Brent Cockbain: (2003–2007)
- Olly Cracknell: (2025–)
- Sam Cross: (2017)
- Alex Cuthbert (2011–2023)
- Aled Davies: (2017–2019)
- Barry Davies: (2006)
- Bradley Davies: (2009–2019)
- Leigh Davies: (1996–2003)
- Mefin Davies: (2002–2007)
- Rhys Davies: (2023–)
- Sam Davies: (2016–2017)
- Harri Deaves: (2025–)
- Gareth Delve: (2006–2010)
- Adrian Durston: (2001)
- Dan Edwards: (2025–)
- Cai Evans: (2023–2024)
- Dan Evans: (2009)
- Ian Evans: (2006–2014)
- Tomas Francis: (2015–2023)
- Scott Gibbs: (1991–2001)
- Keelan Giles: (2025–)
- Ian Gough: (1998–2010)
- Kieran Hardy: (2020–)
- Joe Hawkins: (2022–2023)
- Gavin Henson: (2001–2011)
- Richard Hibbard: (2006–2015)
- James Hook: (2006–2015)
- Dafydd Howells: (2013)
- Paul James: (2003–2016)
- Aaron Jarvis: (2012–2016)
- Adam Jones: (2003–2014)
- Alun Wyn Jones: (2006–2023)
- Duncan Jones: (2001–2009)
- Matt Jones: (2005)
- Rhodri Jones: (2012–2022)
- Ryan Jones: (2004–2013)
- James King: (2013–2017)
- Tavis Knoyle: (2010–2013)
- Dewi Lake: (2022–)
- Gareth Llewellyn: (1989–2004)
- Andy Lloyd: (2001)
- Dan Lydiate: (2009–2023)
- Rob McCusker: (2010–2013)
- Craig Mitchell: (2009–2013)
- Jac Morgan: (2022–)
- Luke Morgan: (2018)
- Matthew Morgan: (2014–2015)
- Reuben Morgan-Williams: (2025–)
- Ross Moriarty: (2015–2021)
- Morgan Morse: (2025–)
- George North: (2010–2024)
- Sonny Parker: (2002–2008)
- Sam Parry: (2020–2023)
- Mike Phillips: (2003–2015)
- Tom Prydie: (2010–2018)
- Richie Pugh: (2005)
- James Ratti: (2024–)
- Richie Rees: (2010)
- Martin Roberts: (2008–2009)
- Tom Rogers: (2021–)
- Tal Selley: (2005)
- Nicky Smith: (2014–)
- Jonathan Spratt: (2009–2013)
- Mark Taylor: (1994–2005)
- Gareth Thomas: (2021–)
- Gavin Thomas: (2001–2010)
- Jonathan Thomas: (2003–2011)
- Rory Thornton: (2017)
- Justin Tipuric: (2011–2023)
- Eli Walker: (2015)
- Owen Watkin: (2017–2025)
- Rhys Webb: (2012–2023)
- Andy Williams: (2003–2007)
- Barry Williams: (1996–2002)
- Keiran Williams: (2023)
- Owen Williams: (2017–2023)
- Scott Williams: (2011–2019)
- Shane Williams: (2000–2011)

=== British & Irish Lions ===
The following players were selected for the British & Irish Lions touring squads while contracted to the Ospreys:

- Brent Cockbain: 2005
- Gavin Henson: 2005
- Ryan Jones: 2005, 2009
- Shane Williams: 2005, 2009
- Tommy Bowe: 2009
- Lee Byrne: 2009
- Adam Jones: 2009, 2013
- Alun Wyn Jones: 2009, 2013, 2017, 2021
- Mike Phillips: 2009
- James Hook: 2009
- Richard Hibbard: 2013
- Ian Evans: 2013
- Justin Tipuric: 2013, 2017, 2021
- Dan Biggar: 2017
- Rhys Webb: 2017
- Adam Beard: 2021
- Jac Morgan: 2025

=== Centurions ===
Players who have reached the 100 appearance mark for the Ospreys. The first numbers in brackets are the years they represented the Ospreys, while the second numbers in bold are the number of caps they received. Caps updated on 31 October 2026.

- Lloyd Ashley: (2011–2022) **(153)**
- Scott Baldwin: (2008–2019, 2022–2023) **(183)**
- Adam Beard: (2014–2025) **(141)**
- Joe Bearman: (2011–2017) **(101)**
- Ashley Beck: (2007–2018) **(137)**
- Huw Bennett: (2003–2012) **(142)**
- Ryan Bevington: (2007–2016) **(112)**
- Dan Biggar: (2008–2018) **(221)**
- Andrew Bishop: (2005–2015) **(209)**
- Tom Botha: (2018–) **(166)**
- Shaun Connor: (2003–2008) **(101)**
- Olly Cracknell: (2015–2021) **(117)**
- Sam Davies: (2012–2019) **(150)**
- Hanno Dirksen: (2009–2021) **(154)**
- Dan Evans: (2014–2022) **(173)**
- Ian Evans: (2005–2014) **(129)**
- Maʻafu Fia: (2015–2021) **(105)**
- Richard Fussell: (2010–2016) **(113)**
- Keelan Giles: (2016–) **(132)**
- Ian Gough: (2007–2014) **(119)**
- Cai Griffiths: (2003–2012, 2014–2015) **(132)**
- Tom Habberfield: (2011–2019) **(135)**
- Richard Hibbard: (2004–2014) **(175)**
- James Hook: (2004–2012, 2017–2020) **(149)**
- Paul James: (2003–2012, 2015–2018) **(232)**
- Adam Jones: (2003–2014) **(195)**
- Alun Wyn Jones: (2005–2023) **(268)**
- Duncan Jones: (2003–2015) **(223)**
- Ryan Jones: (2004–2014) **(150)**
- James King: (2009–2020) **(203)**
- Luke Morgan: (2012–) **(119)**
- Reuben Morgan-Williams: (2017–) **(138)**
- Morgan Morris: (2017–) **(131)**
- Scott Otten: (2014–2021) **(110)**
- Sonny Parker: (2004–2012) **(157)**
- Sam Parry: (2014–) **(190)**
- Nicky Smith: (2013–2024) **(191)**
- Jonathan Spratt: (2006–2010, 2012–2017) **(102)**
- Steve Tandy: (2003–2010) **(102)**
- Gareth Thomas: (2014–) **(156)**
- Jonathan Thomas: (2003–2013) **(188)**
- Justin Tipuric: (2009–2025) **(229)**
- Nikki Walker: (2006–2012) **(103)**
- Owen Watkin: (2015–) **(140)**
- Rhys Webb: (2007–2018, 2020–2023) **(200)**
- Barry Williams: (2003–2007) **(101)**
- Keiran Williams: (2016–) **(111)**
- Shane Williams: (2003–2012) **(141)**

=== Non-Welsh internationals ===
Non-Welsh players who have international caps who represented the Ospreys.

- (Australia) Lalakai Foketi
- (Australia) Marika Koroibete
- (Australia) Liam Wright
- (Canada) Tyler Ardron
- (Canada) Jeff Hassler
- (Canada) Phil Mack
- (Canada) Chauncey O'Toole
- (Canada) Luke Tait
- (England) Stephen Myler
- (England) Ethan Roots
- (England) Sam Underhill
- (Fiji) Tevita Cavubati
- (Fiji) Josh Matavesi
- (Fiji) Alfie Mocelutu
- (Fiji) Aisea Natoga
- (Fiji) Waisea Nayacalevu
- (Georgia (country)) Giorgi Nemsadze
- (Germany) Jamie Murphy
- (Ireland) Tommy Bowe
- (Italy) Tito Tebaldi
- (Moldova) Dmitri Arhip
- (Namibia) Lesley Klim
- (New Zealand) Adrian Cashmore
- (New Zealand) Jerry Collins
- (New Zealand) Marty Holah
- (New Zealand) Campbell Johnstone
- (New Zealand) Brendon Leonard
- (New Zealand) Justin Marshall
- (New Zealand) Filo Tiatia
- (Romania) Gheorghe Gajion
- (Samoa) Kieron Fonotia
- (Samoa) Kahn Fotuali'i
- (Samoa) Jordan Lay
- (Samoa) Filipo Levi
- (Samoa) Elvis Seveali'i
- (Samoa) George Stowers
- (Scotland) Darryl Marfo
- (Scotland) Nikki Walker
- (South Africa) JJ Engelbrecht
- (South Africa) Ricky Januarie
- (South Africa) Brian Mujati
- (South Africa) Marvin Orie
- (South Africa) Stefan Terblanche
- (South Africa) Marnus van der Merwe
- (Tonga) Maʻafu Fia
- (Tonga) Elvis Taione
- (Tonga) Dave Tiueti
- (Tonga) Hale T-Pole
- (United States) Toby Fricker

=== Former Coaches ===
- Lyn Jones (2003–2008)
- Sean Holley (2008–2012)
- Steve Tandy (2012–2018)
- Allen Clarke (2018–2019)
- Carl Hogg & Matt Sherratt (interim) (2019–2020)
- Toby Booth (2020–2024)

=== Club Captains ===
- Scott Gibbs (2003-2004)
- Barry Williams (2004-2006)
- Duncan Jones (2007-2007)
- Ryan Jones (2007-2010)
- Alun Wyn Jones (2010-2018)
- Justin Tipuric (2018-2024)
- Jac Morgan (2024-2026)

== Honours ==
- Celtic League/Pro12/United Rugby Championship (4)
  - Winners: 2004–05, 2006–07, 2009–10, 2011–12
- United Rugby Championship Welsh Shield (3)
  - Winners: 2021–22, 2023–24 , 2025–26
  - Runners-up: 2022–23
- Anglo-Welsh Cup (1)
  - Winners: 2007–08
  - Runners-up: 2006–07

== ERC Elite Awards ==
During the 10th anniversary season of the Heineken Cup, ERC, the tournament organisers, introduced the ERC Elite Awards to recognise players and teams who have made outstanding contributions to the tournament.

Ospreys were awarded the ERC team award for playing 50 games.

Ospreys players who have been awarded 50 tournament caps are:

- Ian Gough
- Adam Jones
- Duncan Jones
- Shane Williams
- Jonathan Thomas
- Sonny Parker

== See also ==
- United Rugby Championship
- Anglo-Welsh Cup
- European Rugby Champions Cup
- EPCR Challenge Cup
