= Ivan van Rooyen =

South Africa professional rugby union football coach

- Born: 7 May 1982 (age 44) South Africa
- University: University of Johannesburg

Rugby union career
- Position: Head coach
- Current team: Emirates Lions
Coaching career
- Years: Team
- 2009–2018: Golden Lions (Strength & Conditioning Coach)
- 2009–2018: Lions (Strength & Conditioning Coach)
- 2018–: Golden Lions
- 2018–: Lions (Assistant coach)
- 2019-present: Lions (Head Coach)

Ivan van Rooyen (born 1982) is a South African professional rugby union football coach. He was short-term head coach of the Lions team that played in the Super Rugby competition. He is also the coach of the Golden Lions team that competes in the Currie Cup. Later he was made permanent head coach of Lions, he remains head coach as of 2022. The Lions now compete in the United Rugby Championship.

== Career and contract information ==
Cash van Rooyen climbed through the coaching ranks at the Lions Rugby Union; based in Johannesburg, South Africa. He started at the union in 2009 as a sport scientist and became Performance Excellence Manager in 2018. He became permanent head coach in 2019.

Rumours circulated in February 2023 that van Rooyen's contract was up for renewal. Despite achieving a win rate of less than 40%, his contract was expected to be "more lucrative than John Dobson", who won the United Rugby Championship in the 2021/22 season with the DHL Stormers. In the same season the Emirates Lions failed to make the playoffs, finishing 12th out of the 16 team competition.

Mzwake Nkosi took over his Currie Cup duties from 2024, whereby Nkosi was able to achieve a Runner-Up finish for the Fidelity ADT Lions. However, in the middle of the 2025 season, van Rooyen can back and replaced Mzwake Nkosi to achieve a runner up finish, losing to the Suzuki Griquas.

== Career statistics ==
=== Head coach ===
Managerial Statistics and Performance
Union	Team	Season	League	Wins	Draws	Losses	Total	Win %
Lions Rugby Union	Golden Lions	2019	Currie Cup	5	0	3	8	62.50
Lions Rugby Union	Golden Lions	2020	Currie Cup	6	2	4	12	50.00
Lions Rugby Union	Emirates Lions	2020	Super Rugby Unlocked	2	0	4	6	33.33
Lions Rugby Union	Golden Lions	2021	Currie Cup	2	3	7	12	16.67
Lions Rugby Union	Emirates Lions	2021/22	United Rugby Championship	8	0	10	18	44.44
Lions Rugby Union	Golden Lions	2022	Currie Cup	2	0	10	12	16.67
Lions Rugby Union	Emirates Lions	2022/23	United Rugby Championship	9	0	9	18	50.00
Lions Rugby Union	Emirates Lions	2022/23	EPCR Challenge Cup	3	1	2	6	50.00
Lions Rugby Union	Fidelity ADT Lions	2023	Currie Cup	6	0	8	14	42.86
Lions Rugby Union	Emirates Lions	2023/24	United Rugby Championship	9	0	9	18	50.00
Lions Rugby Union	Emirates Lions	2024/25	EPCR Challenge Cup	2	0	3	5	40.00
Lions Rugby Union	Emirates Lions	2024/25	United Rugby Championship	8	0	10	18	44.44
Lions Rugby Union	Fidelity ADT Lions	2025	Currie Cup	3	0	1	4	75.00
Lions Rugby Union	Emirates Lions	2025/26	EPCR Challenge Cup	0	0	2	2	0.00
Lions Rugby Union	Emirates Lions	2025/26	United Rugby Championship	3	0	4	7	42.86
Total				61	6	80	147	41.50

== Honours ==
=== As a head coach ===
==== Lions ====
Currie Cup Premier Division Runner-Up 2019

Currie Cup Premier Division Runner-Up 2025
