= Andrew Hore (rugby union administrator) =

Andrew Hore (born 15 April 1972) is a New Zealand rugby union administrator currently working for the Auckland Blues

== Career ==
Andrew Hore played rugby for a University of Otago under U19, U21 side and Senior B's. He then went on to play for Sydenham Rugby Club in Christchurch.

Hore started his career in the administration of rugby with the Canterbury and Crusaders Rugby organisations initially as the Performance manager, part of this role being responsible for initiating the first rugby academy in New Zealand. Andrew then utilised his degree in Sports Science and become the conditioning coach to the successful Canterbury and Crusaders Rugby teams between 1999 and 2002. During this time Canterbury won the Ranfurly Shield and NPC titles and the Crusaders become the first Super team to go through the season unbeaten. Hore was Wales national rugby union team Conditioning Director between 2002 and 2005, having previously held management roles with the Canterbury and Crusaders rugby teams in his native New Zealand. Hore then worked with the Welsh Rugby Union and was part of the team management of the 2005 Grand Slam winning team. In 2006 he returned to New Zealand Rugby Union to undertake a senior management post as a High Performance manager, before moving to Ospreys Rugby initially as Performance Director and finally as CEO.

He was, until 2016, the CEO at Welsh regional side the Ospreys, leaving a High Performance role with the New Zealand Rugby Union in December 2007. Andrew was CEO of NSW Rugby. This role entails overseeing both the Professional and community game in NSW.

Andrew Hore left NSW Rugby in early December 2019 and moved to The Blues .
