= Andrew Hore (cricketer) =

New Zealand cricketer (born 1969)

Personal information
- Full name: Andrew John Hore
- Born: 18 June 1969 (age 57); Oamaru, North Otago, New Zealand
- Batting: Left-handed
- Bowling: Right-arm medium

Domestic team information
- Years: Team
- 1996/97–2004/05: Otago
- Source: CricInfo, 14 May 2016

Andrew John Hore (born 18 June 1969) is a New Zealand former cricketer. He played 26 first-class and 45 List A matches for Otago between 1996 and 2005. In February 2020, he was named in New Zealand's squad for the Over-50s Cricket World Cup in South Africa. However, the tournament was cancelled during the third round of matches due to the COVID-19 pandemic.
