= Mzwakhe Nkosi =

South Africa professional rugby union football coach

Mziwakhe Nkosi
- Born: South Africa

Rugby union career
- Position: Head coach
- Current team: Golden Lions
Coaching career
- Years: Team
- 2015–2020: SA Schools
- 2020–2022: Golden Lions (Assistant coach)
- 2020–: Lions (Assistant coach)
- 2022–: Golden Lions

Mziwakhe Nkosi is a South African professional rugby union football coach. He is currently the head coach of the Golden Lions side that participates in the Currie Cup. He had previously coached the SA Schools side. Before becoming Golden Lions head coach, he was assistant coach to both the Lions and Golden Lions.
