= Ciarán Mangan =

Irish rugby union player

- Born: 17 May 2005 (age 21)
- Height: 1.88 m (6 ft 2 in)
- School: Newbridge College
- Notable relative: Diarmuid Mangan (brother)

Rugby union career
- Position(s): Winger; Centre
- Current team: Leinster Rugby
Senior career
Years	Team	Apps	(Points)
2025-	Leinster		
International career
Years	Team	Apps	(Points)
2025	Ireland U20		

Ciarán Mangan (born 17 May 2005) is an Irish professional rugby union footballer who plays for Leinster Rugby.

== Club career ==
Mangan started playing rugby union with Naas RFC and attended Newbridge College. Alongside rugby he was also a GAA player, and played for the Sallins club in County Kildare. Typically playing on the wing, Mangan also plays centre. He joined the Leinster Rugby academy ahead of the 2025–26 season. He made his senior debut as a replacement for Leinster in a 50–26 win against Zebre in the United Rugby Championship on 25 October 2025.

== International career ==
Mangan played for Ireland U20 in the 2025 U20 Six Nations Championship with his performances including a try against France U20. He subsequently played for Ireland U20 at the 2025 World Rugby U20 Championship.

== Personal life ==
His brother Diarmuid Mangan is also a professional rugby union player for Leinster.
