= JF van Heerden =

South African rugby union player

- Born: 6 May 2004 (age 22) South Africa
- Height: 201 cm (6 ft 7 in)
- Weight: 115 kg (254 lb; 18 st 2 lb)
- School: Grey College, Bloemfontein

Rugby union career
- Position: Lock
- Current team: Bulls
Senior career
Years	Team	Apps	(Points)
2023–	Bulls	18	(0)
International career
Years	Team	Apps	(Points)
2023-	South Africa U20	10	(0)

JF van Heerden (born 6 May 2004) is a South African rugby union player who plays as a lock forward for the Bulls.

== Early life ==
He attended Grey College where he was a member of their first XV. He played for Free State U18 as well as South Africa U18 in 2022.

== Career ==
He was named in the Bulls squad for the 2023–24 season. He went on to produce notable performances in the European Rugby Champions Cup during the 2023–24 season. He started against Lyon as the side clinched a quarter final place, and retained a starting place for the quarter final against Northampton Saints.

== Style of play ==
He has been described as a "lineout general" but also "an enforcer" and "an impeccable athlete".

== International career ==
He was selected for the South Africa U20 side that played at the 2023 World Rugby U20 Championship.
