= Ben O'Connor (rugby union) =

Irish rugby union player

- Born: 20 August 2004 (age 22)
- Height: 1.88 m (6 ft 2 in)
- Weight: 97 kg (214 lb; 15 st 4 lb)
- School: Presentation Brothers College

Rugby union career
- Position(s): Wing, Full-back
Senior career
Years	Team	Apps	(Points)
2023–	Munster	22	(15)
- Correct as of 31 October 2026
International career
Years	Team	Apps	(Points)
2024	Ireland U20		

Ben O'Connor (born 20 August 2004) is an Irish rugby union player, currently playing for United Rugby Championship and European Rugby Champions Cup side Munster. He plays at full-back and wing.

== Early life ==
From County Cork, O'Connor was a hurler, and captained the Cork minors to the All-Ireland title before doing similary with the Cork U-20 hurling team in 2023. He also played for St Finbarr's National Hurling & Football Club. Having also played rugby union at Presentation Brothers College, Cork, with whom he won the Senior Cup in 2023, he was offered a place in the academy at Munster Rugby.

== Club career ==
O'Connor made his senior Munster Rugby debut in the United Rugby Championship (URC) in November 2023 as a second-half replacement for Sean O'Brien in a 45-14 win against Dragons. The debut came 153 days after he won the All-Ireland U20 Hurling Championship with Cork. Having made a further six appearances as a replacement, in January 2025, he was awarded a first start for Munster, against Dragons, in the URC. Later that year, he made his debut start in the European Rugby Champions Cup against Gloucester Rugby.

Ahead of the 2026-27 season, O'Connor was promoted from the Academy to the senior Munster squad on a two-year contract, having made 17 senior appearances in total, including five in the Champions Cup.

== International career ==
O'Connor made his debut for the Ireland Under-20 team against France U20 in February 2024.
