= John McKee (rugby union, born 2000) =

Irish rugby union player (born 2000)

- Born: 15 February 2000 (age 26) Belfast, Northern Ireland
- Height: 1.83 m (6 ft 0 in)
- Weight: 108 kg (238 lb; 17 st 0 lb)
- School: Campbell College, Belfast

Rugby union career
- Position: Hooker
- Current team: Scarlets
Amateur team(s)
Years	Team	Apps	(Points)
2022-2024	Terenure College RFC	6	(0)
Senior career
Years	Team	Apps	(Points)
2021–2026	Leinster	45	(25)
2026–	Scarlets	0	(0)
- Correct as of 21 March 2026
International career
Years	Team	Apps	(Points)
2019–2020	Ireland U20s	9	(5)
- Correct as of 25 April 2022

John McKee (born 15 February 2000) is an Irish rugby union player, currently playing for United Rugby Championship side Scarlets. His preferred position is hooker.

== Club career ==
=== Leinster ===
McKee was named in the Leinster Rugby academy for the 2021–22 season. He made his debut in Round 16 of the 2021–22 United Rugby Championship against the Sharks. Leinster Rugby announced Mckee's first senior contract with the club on 20 April 2023

=== Scarlets ===
McKee signed with Welsh club Scarlets on 14 May 2026.
