= Morné Brandon =

South African rugby union player

- Full name: Morné Brandon
- Born: 25 November 2000 (age 25) South Africa

Rugby union career
- Position: Hooker
- Current team: Lions / Golden Lions
Senior career
Years	Team	Apps	(Points)
2019	Golden Lions XV	1	(0)
2021–	Lions	38	(50)
2021–	Golden Lions	30	(35)
- Correct as of 3 November 2026

Morné Brandon (born 25 November 2000) is a South African rugby union player for the Lions in the Pro14 Rainbow Cup SA. His regular position is hooker.

Brandon was named in the Lions squad for the Pro14 Rainbow Cup SA competition. He made his debut for the Lions in Round 1 of the Pro14 Rainbow Cup SA against the Bulls.
