= Stephen Smyth (rugby union) =

Irish rugby union player (born 2004)

- Born: 1 August 2004 (age 22) Carlow, Ireland
- Height: 1.87 m (6 ft 2 in)
- Weight: 114 kg (251 lb)
- School: Kilkenny College

Rugby union career
- Position: Hooker
- Current team: Leinster
Senior career
Years	Team	Apps	(Points)
2024-	Leinster	5	(5)
International career
Years	Team	Apps	(Points)
- Ireland U20

Stephen Smyth (born 1 August 2004) is an Irish professional rugby union footballer who plays as a hooker for Leinster Rugby.

== Early life ==
From Carlow, he attended Kilkenny College and played rugby union for Carlow RFC as well as playing Gaelic Football for Carlow Minors.

== Career ==
He initially played as a number eight before later developing as a hooker. He captained Ireland at under-19 level, and also represented Ireland at under-20 level, including at the 2024 World Rugby U20 Championship in South Africa, in which he scored a try in Ireland's win against Georgia. He made his Leinster Rugby debut during the 2024–25 season, during which he also played for Ireland A.

In June 2025, he was called up to the senior Ireland national rugby union team for their summer tour.
