= Caspar Gabriel =

Austrian rugby union player

- Born: 18 October 2005 (age 21) Vienna, Austria
- Height: 1.90 m (6 ft 3 in)
- Weight: 93 kg (205 lb)
- School: Terenure College

Rugby union career
- Position: Fly-half
- Current team: Leinster
Senior career
Years	Team	Apps	(Points)
2025-	Leinster		
International career
Years	Team	Apps	(Points)
2024	Ireland U19		

Caspar Gabriel (born 18 October 2005) is an Austrian rugby union footballer who plays as a fly-half for Leinster Rugby.

== Early life ==
Born in Vienna, he left Austria at the age of 14 years-old to pursue a rugby union career in Ireland. At the age of 18 years-old he made his debut for the Ireland U19 side. He played rugby at Terenure College and played for Terenure College RFC in the AIL.

== Club career ==
After playing for Leinster U19 he joined the Leinster Rugby Academy for the 2024–25 season, and training with the senior Leinster squad. He made his senior debut as a replacement for Leinster in a 50–26 win against Zebre in the United Rugby Championship on 25 October 2025. He made his first start for Leinster on 26 September 2026 against Lions in the United Rugby Championship.

== International career ==
He represented Ireland at U19 level against Wales in 2024. However, his return to Austria during the COVID-19 pandemic disrupted his continuous residency in Ireland and he was ineligible for selection for the Ireland U20 team in 2025.

== Personal life ==
His father, Thomas, is a former president of the Austrian Rugby Federation.
