= 2026–27 Dragons RFC season =

Dragons
- 2026–27 season
- Head coach: Filo Tiatia
- Chairman CEO: David Wright; Rhys Blumberg
- Captain: Ben Carter

The 2026–27 season is Dragons' sixth season in the United Rugby Championship, and 24th season in all formats of the competition since the region was formed in 2003. Previously, the region had been represented in the then Celtic League by traditional Welsh clubs of Caerphilly RFC, Ebbw Vale RFC and Newport RFC.

As well as competing in the URC and its Welsh Shield competition, Dragons RFC will also participate in the 2026–27 EPCR Challenge Cup.

== Staff and management ==
Filo Tiatia continues as head coach of the Dragons. The following is the senior coaching team for the Dragons in 2026–27.

Staff	Role
Filo Tiatia	Head coach
James Chapron	Head of Rugby Operations
Dale MacLeod	Senior Coach
Sam Hobbs	Senior Coach
Matt O'Brien	Senior Coach
Tom Hancock	Senior Coach

=== Players in ===
- (Tonga) Anzelo Tuitavuki from (France) Colomiers
- (New Zealand) Terrell Peita from (New Zealand) Blues
- (Wales) Caio Parry from (Wales) RGC 1404
- (Samoa) Ere Enari from (New Zealand) Hurricanes

=== Players out ===
- (Wales) Aaron Wainwright to (England) Leicester Tigers
- (Wales) Ewan Rosser to (Wales) Pontypool
- (Ireland) Niall Armstrong (released)
- (Wales) James Benjamin (retired)
- (Wales) Luke Yendle (released)
- (Wales) George Roberts to (Wales) Scarlets

== United Rugby Championship ==
=== Matches ===
Dragons RFC will begin their sixth URC campaign away to Italian side Benetton Rugby.

25 September 2026	Benetton (Italy)	19-19	(Wales) Dragons	Stadio Monigo, Treviso
19:45	Try: Mey 12' c Bernasconi 24'c Mendy 40+1' m Con: Umaga (2/30 13' 25'	Report; Scorecard; Highlights	Try: De Beer 28' c Inisi 44' c Dee 78' m Con: De Beer (2/3) 28' 45'	Referee: Christopher Allison

3 October 2026	(1 BP) Dragons (Wales)	38-26	(Wales) Scarlets	Rodney Parade, Newport
15:00	Try: Tuitauki 13' c Dee (2) 23' m, 71' c Martinez 41' c Anderson 65' m Hunt 80 + 1' c Con: De Beer (3/5) 14' 43' 72'; Lloyd 80 + 2'	Report; Scorecard; Highlights	Try: Page (2) 2' c, 28' c O'Connor 58' c Jones 73' m Con: Costelow (3/4) 3' 29' 59 '	Referee: Jones

9 October	(2 BP) Dragons (Wales)	31–38	(Wales) Ospreys (1 BP)	Rodney Parade, Newport
19:45	Try: Dee (2) 5' c, 50' c penalty try, 40+3'; Tuitavuki 56' c Con: de Beer (3/3) 6', 51', 57'; Pen: O'Brien 82'	Report; Scorecard; Highlights	Try: Moriarty 17' c Giles 35' m Parry (2) 46' c, 54' c Morris (2) 72' m, 79' c Con: Edwards (4/6) 18', 47', 55', 80'; Cards: Moriarty (yellow card) 42'	Attendance: 6,037; Referee: Robbie Jenkinson (Ireland)

24 October	(1 BP) Ospreys (Wales)	31–14	(Wales) Dragons	St Helen's, Swansea
	Try: Morgan-Williams (2) 6' c, 30' c Parry 36' m penalty try 42'; Moriarty 54' m Con: Edwards (2) 7', 31'	Report; Scorecard	Try: Dyer 43' c Tuitavuki 64' c Con: de Beer (2/2) 44', 65'; Cards: Williams (yellow card) 42' de Beer (yellow card) 54'; Owen (yellow card) 68'	Attendance: 5,592; Referee: Ben Whitehouse (Wales)

31 October 2026	(1BP) Dragons (Wales)	35-14	(Italy) Zebre Parma	Rodney Parade, Newport
17:30	Try: Richards 6' c Tuitavuki 29' c Inisi 55' c Evans 72' c Penalty Try 80+1; Con: de Beer (4/4) 7' 30' 56' 73'		Try: Canali 64' c Wade 79' c Con: Da Re (2) 65' 79'; Cards: Gesi (yellow card) 55'	Referee: Griffin Colby

4 December 2026	Edinburgh (Scotland)	v	(Wales) Dragons	Edinburgh Rugby Stadium
19:45

19 December 2026	Cardiff (Wales)	v	(Wales) Dragons	Cardiff Arms Park
15:00

26 December 2026	Dragons (Wales)	v	(Wales) Cardiff	Rodney Parade, Newport
15:00

2 January 2027	Scarlets (Wales)	v	(Wales) Dragons	Parc y Scarlets, Llanelli
15:00

23 January 2027	Leinster (Ireland)	v	(Wales) Dragons	RDS Arena, Dublin
17:30

29 January 2027	Dragons (Wales)	v	(Ireland) Munster	Rodney Parade, Newport
19:45

26 February 2027	Dragons (Wales)	v	(Ireland) Ulster	Rodney Parade, Newport
19:45

20 March 2027	Bulls (South Africa)	v	(Wales) Dragons	Loftus Versfeld Stadium, Pretoria
15:00

27 March 2027	Sharks (South Africa)	v	(Wales) Dragons	Kings Park Stadium, Durban
16:30

16 April 2027	Dragons (Wales)	v	(Scotland) Glasgow Warriors	Rodney Parade, Newport
19:45

24 April 2027	Connacht (Ireland)	v	(Wales) Dragons	The Sportsground, Galway
19:45

7 May 2027	Dragons (Wales)	v	(South Africa) Lions	Rodney Parade, Newport
19:45

15 May 2027	Dragons (Wales)	v	(South Africa) Stormers	Rodney Parade, Newport
17:30

=== Standings ===
Pos	Team	Pld	W	D	L	PF	PA	PD	TF	TA	TB	LB	Pts	Qualification
1	Glasgow Warriors	5	4	1	0	148	112	+36	22	15	5	0	23	Qualification for the Champions Cup and knockout stage
2	Bulls	5	4	0	1	214	106	+108	31	15	4	1	21	Qualification for the Champions Cup and knockout stage
3	Stormers	5	4	0	1	166	101	+65	24	14	4	1	21	Qualification for the Champions Cup and knockout stage
4	Sharks	5	4	0	1	140	107	+33	20	16	3	0	19	Qualification for the Champions Cup and knockout stage
5	Edinburgh	5	4	0	1	123	95	+28	17	12	3	0	19	Qualification for the Champions Cup and knockout stage
6	Leinster	5	3	0	2	149	81	+68	23	11	4	2	18	Qualification for the Champions Cup and knockout stage
7	Cardiff	5	3	0	2	113	107	+6	17	17	2	0	14	Qualification for the Champions Cup and knockout stage
8	Dragons	5	2	1	2	137	128	+9	20	20	3	1	14	Qualification for the Champions Cup and knockout stage
9	Ospreys	5	2	0	3	112	147	−35	18	21	3	0	11	Qualification for the Challenge Cup
10	Benetton	5	1	1	3	115	104	+11	16	17	2	3	11	Qualification for the Challenge Cup
11	Connacht	5	2	0	3	109	161	−52	18	24	2	0	10	Qualification for the Challenge Cup
12	Munster	5	1	1	3	93	113	−20	12	17	2	2	10	Qualification for the Challenge Cup
13	Lions	5	2	0	3	107	162	−55	15	25	1	0	9	Qualification for the Challenge Cup
14	Scarlets	5	1	0	4	134	191	−57	20	29	4	1	9	Qualification for the Challenge Cup
15	Ulster	5	0	2	3	121	160	−39	18	22	4	1	9	Qualification for the Challenge Cup
16	Zebre	5	0	0	5	93	199	−106	14	30	2	0	2	Qualification for the Challenge Cup

Updated to match(es) played on 2nd November 2026. Source: UnitedRugby.com
Rules for classification: Tiebreakers for teams tied on points: 1) Number of matches won 2) The difference between points for and points against 3) The number of tries scored 4) The most points scored 5) The difference between tries for and tries against 6) The fewest red cards received 7) The fewest yellow cards received.

=== URC Welsh Shield ===
Dragons RFC enter the URC Welsh Shield yet to win the competition in five attempts. In 2026–27, the Dragons' fixtures against other Welsh regions are heavily front loaded, making up six of the first nine games of Dragons' domestic season, with their Welsh Shield campaign completed in the first week of January 2027.

2026–27 United Rugby Championship Regional Shield tables
(Wales) Welsh Shield
	Team	P	W	D	L	PF	PA	PD	TF	TA	TBP	LBP	Pts	Pos overall
1	(Wales) Dragons	2	1	0	1	69	64	+5	10	10	2	1	7	6
2	(Wales) Ospreys	1	1	0	0	38	31	+7	6	4	1	0	5	10
3	(Wales) Cardiff	1	1	0	0	21	15	+6	3	2	0	0	4	3
4	(Wales) Scarlets	2	0	0	2	41	59	–18	6	9	1	1	2	15
If teams are level at any stage, tiebreakers are applied in the following order: 1. number of matches won 2. the difference between points for and points against 3. the number of tries scored 4. the most points scored 5. the difference between tries for and tries against 6. the fewest red cards received 7. the fewest yellow cards received
Green background indicates teams currently leading the regional shield. Upon the conclusion of the regular season, these teams win their respective regional shields. (S) : URC Shield champion

== EPCR Challenge Cup ==
2026–27 EPCR Challenge Cup

=== Pool 1 ===
EPCR Challenge Cup Pool 1
Pos	Team	Pld	W	D	L	PF	PA	PD	TF	TA	TB	LB	Pts	Qualification
1	(Ireland) Ulster	1	1	0	0	40	21	+19	6	3	1	0	5	Home round of 16
2	(Wales) Dragons	1	1	0	0	29	14	+15	4	2	0	0	4	Home round of 16
3	(France) Bayonne	1	1	0	0	29	27	+2	5	3	0	0	4	Home round of 16
4	(South Africa) Cheetahs	1	0	0	1	27	29	−2	3	5	0	1	1	Away round of 16
5	(France) Perpignan	1	0	0	1	14	29	−15	2	4	0	0	0	
6	(Italy) Zebre Parma	1	0	0	1	21	40	−19	3	6	0	0	0	

First match(es) will be played: 16 October 2026. Source: EPCR
Rules for classification: Tiebreakers for teams tied on points: 1) Number of matches won; 2) Difference between points for and against; 3) Total number of points for; 4) Aggregate number of points scored in matches between tied teams; 5) Number of matches won excluding the first match, then the second and so on until the tie is settled.

=== Pool stage ===
16 October 2026	Dragons (Wales)	29-14	(France) Perpignan	Rodney Parade, Newport
20:00	Try: Rosser 12' m Owen 55' c Tuitavuki 67' c Paea 76' c Con: de Beer (3/3) 56' 68' 77'; Pen: de Beer 64'	Report	Try: Coulon 29' c Tuilagi 61' c Con: Tedder (2/2) 29' 62 '	Attendance: 4,636; Referee: Hanru van Rooyen (South Africa))

13 December 2026	Cheetahs (South Africa)	v	(Wales) Dragons	St Helen's (Swansea, Wales)
13:00		Report

8 January 2027	Dragons (Wales)	v	(France) Bayonne	Rodney Parade
20:00		Report

16 January 2027	Ulster (Ireland)	v	(Wales) Dragons	Affidea Stadium
		Report
