= 2022 World Rugby Pacific Nations Cup =

Tournament details
- Countries: Australia A Fiji; Samoa; Tonga
- Date: 2–16 July 2022

Tournament statistics
- Teams: 4
- Matches played: 4
- Tries scored: 28 (7 per match)
- Top point scorer(s): Ryan Lonergan (24 points)
- Top try scorer(s): Ray Niuia (3 tries)

Final
- Champions: Samoa (4th title)
- Runners-up: Australia A

The 2022 World Rugby Pacific Nations Cup was the fifteenth edition of the Pacific Nations Cup annual international rugby union competition and the first since 2019, with a 2-year lay-off due to the COVID-19 pandemic.

Four teams competed, with Fiji, Samoa and Tonga all returning to the competition with the addition of Australia A who re-joined the competition for the first time since 2008.

Fiji hosted the entire tournament for the first time since 2018, with Suva and Lautoka hosting matches over three Saturdays in the July test window. The competition will be played in a round-robin format with the Pacific Nations Cup winner determined by the highest number of competition points at the end of the tournament, with a win worth four points, a draw two points and bonus points for scoring four or more tries or losing by seven points or less.

Samoa won the title after winning all three games, the fourth time that they have done this and the first since a joint title in 2014 and an individual title in 2012.

== Standings ==
Pos	Team	Pld	W	D	L	PF	PA	PD	TF	TA	TB	LB	Pts
1	Samoa	3	3	0	0	88	64	+24	12	8	2	0	14
2	Australia A	3	2	0	1	97	71	+26	13	11	3	1	12
3	Fiji	3	1	0	2	74	55	+19	10	6	1	1	6
4	Tonga	3	0	0	3	40	109	−69	5	15	0	0	0

Rules for classification: 4 points for a win, 2 points for a draw, 1 bonus point for a loss by seven points or less, 1 bonus point for scoring four or more tries in a match

== Fixtures ==
=== Round 1 ===
2 July 2022
13:00 FJT (UTC+12)

(2 BP) Australia A	26–31	Samoa (1 BP)
Try: McReight (2) 23' c, 55' c Lonergan 52' m Tuttle 75' c Con: Lonergan (2/3) 24', 56'; Hodge (1/1) 76'	Report	Try: S. Lam 4' c Ah Wong (2) 20' m, 77' m Leuila 27' c Taumateine 68' c Con: Iona (3/5) 5', 27', 70'

ANZ National Stadium, Suva
Referee: Jaco Peyper (South Africa)

Team details

FB	15	Reece Hodge
RW	14	Mark Nawaqanitawase		(substituted off) 64'
OC	13	Lalakai Foketi		(substituted off) 67'
IC	12	Hamish Stewart
LW	11	Jock Campbell
FH	10	Tane Edmed
SH	9	Ryan Lonergan (c)		(substituted off) 73'
N8	8	Will Harris		(substituted off) 54'
OF	7	Fraser McReight
BF	6	Tim Anstee
RL	5	Ryan Smith	(yellow card) 20' to 30'
LL	4	Seru Uru		(substituted off) 59'
TP	3	Tom Robertson		(substituted off) 67'
HK	2	Billy Pollard		(substituted off) 54'
LP	1	Matt Gibbon		(substituted off) 54'
Replacements:
HK	16	Feleti Kaitu'u		(substituted in) 54'
PR	17	Harry Hoopert		(substituted in) 54'
PR	18	Archer Holz		(substituted in) 67'
FL	19	Hugh Sinclair		(substituted in) 59'
FL	20	Langi Gleeson		(substituted in) 54'
SH	21	James Tuttle		(substituted in) 73'
CE	22	Hudson Creighton		(substituted in) 67'
WG	23	Dylan Pietsch		(substituted in) 64'
Coach:
(Australia) Jason Gilmore

FB	15	Danny Toala
RW	14	Lolagi Visinia	(substituted off) 75'
OC	13	Neria Fomai
IC	12	D'Angelo Leuila
LW	11	Nigel Ah Wong
FH	10	Rodney Iona
SH	9	Ere Enari	(substituted off) 54'
N8	8	Fritz Lee
OF	7	Alamanda Motuga	(substituted off) 61'
BF	6	Olajuwon Noah	(substituted off) 49'
RL	5	Chris Vui	(substituted off) 57'
LL	4	Sam Slade
TP	3	Michael Alaalatoa (c)	(substituted off) 59'
HK	2	Seilala Lam	(substituted off) 59'
LP	1	Aki Seiuli	(substituted off) 48'
Replacements:
HK	16	Ray Niuia	(substituted in) 59'
PR	17	Andrew Tuala	(substituted in) 48'
PR	18	Marco Fepulea'i	(substituted in) 59'
LK	19	Theo McFarland	(substituted in) 57'
FL	20	Henry Stowers	(substituted in) 61'
FL	21	Jack Lam	(substituted in) 49'
SH	22	Jonathan Taumateine	(substituted in) 54'
CE	23	Henry Taefu	(substituted in) 75'
Coach:
(Samoa) Seilala Mapusua

Assistant referees:
Graham Cooper (Australia)
Tevita Rokovereni (Fiji)

Notes:

- Nigel Ah Wong, Ere Enari, Marco Fepulea'i, Fritz Lee, Aki Seiuli, Danny Toala, Andrew Tuala and Lolagi Visinia (all Samoa) made their international debuts.

2 July 2022
15:30 FJT (UTC+12)

(1 BP) Fiji	36–0	Tonga
Try: Ratuva 7' c Wainiqolo 11' m Ravouvou 25' c Tuicuvu 56' c Habosi 63' c Con: Tela (4/5) 8', 26', 57', 64'; Pen: Tuicuvu (1/1) 38'	Report

ANZ National Stadium, Suva
Referee: Ben O'Keeffe (New Zealand)

Team details

FB	15	Seta Tuicuvu		(substituted off) 71'
RW	14	Jiuta Wainiqolo
OC	13	Waisea Nayacalevu (c)		(substituted off) 58'
IC	12	Kalaveti Ravouvou
LW	11	Vinaya Habosi
FH	10	Teti Tela	(yellow card) 29' to 39'
SH	9	Frank Lomani		(substituted off) 60'
N8	8	Albert Tuisue		(substituted off) 65'
OF	7	Rusiate Nasove
BF	6	Mesu Kunavula
RL	5	Tevita Ratuva		(substituted off) 48'
LL	4	Isoa Nasilasila
TP	3	Manasa Saulo		(substituted off) 40'
HK	2	Tevita Ikanivere		(substituted off) 40'
LP	1	Haereiti Hetet		(substituted off) 40'
Replacements:
HK	16	Sam Matavesi		(substituted in) 40'
PR	17	Eroni Mawi		(substituted in) 40'
PR	18	Luke Tagi		(substituted in) 40'
LK	19	Api Ratuniyarawa		(substituted in) 48'
FL	20	Kitione Kamikamica		(substituted in) 65'
SH	21	Ratu Peni Matawalu		(substituted in) 60'
CE	22	Seta Tamanivalu		(substituted in) 58'
WG	23	Manasa Mataele		(substituted in) 71'
Coach:
(New Zealand) Vern Cotter

FB	15	Charles Piutau
RW	14	Israel Folau	(substituted off) 30'
OC	13	Afusipa Taumoepeau
IC	12	Malakai Fekitoa	(substituted off) 66'
LW	11	Anzelo Tuitavuki
FH	10	William Havili
SH	9	Sonatane Takulua (c)	(substituted off) 68'
N8	8	Sione Tuipulotu	(substituted off) 69'
OF	7	Solomone Funaki
BF	6	Tanginoa Halaifonua
RL	5	Veikoso Poloniati	(substituted off) 47'
LL	4	Leva Fifita
TP	3	Siate Tokolahi	(substituted off) 68'
HK	2	Sam Moli	(substituted off) 47'
LP	1	Siegfried Fisiihoi	(substituted off) 65'
Replacements:
HK	16	Siua Maile	(substituted in) 47'
PR	17	David Lolohea	(substituted in) 65'
PR	18	Joe Apikotoa	(substituted in) 68'
FL	19	Sione Havili Talitui	(substituted in) 47'
FL	20	Lotu Inisi	(substituted in) 69'
SH	21	Manu Paea	(substituted in) 68'
FH	22	James Faiva	(substituted in) 66'
WG	23	Tima Fainga'anuku	(substituted in) 30'
Coach:
(Australia) Toutai Kefu

Assistant referees:
Mike Fraser (New Zealand)
Jono Bredin (New Zealand)

Notes:

- Vinaya Habosi, Ratu Peni Matawalu, Isoa Nasilasila, Rusiate Nasove, Kalaveti Ravouvou and Seta Tamanivalu (all Fiji) and Joe Apikotoa, Tima Fainga'anuku, Malakai Fekitoa, Israel Folau, William Havili, Lotu Inisi, Manu Paea, Charles Piutau, Veikoso Poloniati, Sione Havili Talitui, Siate Tokolahi and Anzelo Tuitavuki (all Tonga) made their international debuts.
- This is the first time since 1932 that Tonga have failed to score points against Fiji.

=== Round 2 ===
9 July 2022
12:00 FJT (UTC+12)

(1 BP) Samoa	34–18	Tonga
Try: Niuia (3) 35' c, 46' m, 52' m Manu 63' c McFarland 77' c Con: Alatimu (2/4) 36', 64'; Leuila (1/1) 78'; Pen: Alatimu (1/1) 19'	Report	Try: F. Paea 21' m Poloniati 28' c Con: Faiva (1/2) 29'; Pen: Faiva (2/2) 5', 8'

Churchill Park, Lautoka
Referee: Graham Cooper (Australia)

Team details

FB	15	Danny Toala	(substituted off) 61'
RW	14	Ed Fidow	(substituted off) 50'
OC	13	Neria Fomai
IC	12	Tumua Manu
LW	11	Nigel Ah Wong
FH	10	AJ Alatimu
SH	9	Jonathan Taumateine
N8	8	Jordan Taufua
OF	7	Jack Lam	(substituted off) 43'
BF	6	Theo McFarland
RL	5	Chris Vui
LL	4	Sam Slade
TP	3	Michael Alaalatoa (c)	(substituted off) 72'
HK	2	Ray Niuia
LP	1	Andrew Tuala	(substituted off) 41'
Replacements:
HK	16	Seilala Lam
PR	17	Aki Seiuli	(substituted in) 41'
PR	18	Kalolo Tuiloma	(substituted in) 72'
LK	19	Michael Curry
N8	20	Fritz Lee	(substituted in) 43'
SH	21	Auvasa Faleali'i
FH	22	D'Angelo Leuila	(substituted in) 61'
FB	23	Lolagi Visinia	(substituted in) 50'
Coach:
(Samoa) Seilala Mapusua

FB	15	William Havili
RW	14	Tima Fainga'anuku
OC	13	Afusipa Taumoepeau
IC	12	Fetuli Paea
LW	11	Anzelo Tuitavuki		(substituted off) 70'
FH	10	James Faiva
SH	9	Sonatane Takulua (c)		(substituted off) 58'
N8	8	Sione Tuipulotu
OF	7	Sione Havili		(substituted off) 58'
BF	6	Tanginoa Halaifonua
RL	5	Sam Lousi		(substituted off) 61'
LL	4	Veikoso Poloniati	(yellow card) 45' to 55'
TP	3	Ben Tameifuna		(substituted off) 41'
HK	2	Siua Maile
LP	1	Siegfried Fisiihoi		(substituted off) 42'
Replacements:
HK	16	Sam Moli
PR	17	Feao Fotuaika		(substituted in) 42'
PR	18	Siate Tokolahi		(substituted in) 41'
LK	19	Semisi Paea		(substituted in) 61'
FL	20	Solomone Funaki		(substituted in) 58'
FL	21	Lotu Inisi
SH	22	Manu Paea		(substituted in) 58'
WG	23	Otumaka Mausia		(substituted in) 70'
Coach:
(Australia) Toutai Kefu

Assistant referees:
Angus Mabey (New Zealand)
Tevita Rokovereni (Fiji)

Notes:

- Feao Fotuaika and Semisi Paea (all Tonga) made their international debuts.

9 July 2022
15:30 FJT (UTC+12)

Fiji	18–32	Australia A (1 BP)
Try: Tamanivalu 24' m Botia 34' m Ratuniyarawa 56' m Pen: Tela (1/1) 8'	Report	Try: Sinclair 13' c Pietsch 28'; Daugunu 47' c Williams 63' c Con: Lonergan (3/3) 14', 48', 64'; Pen: Lonergan (2/2) 19', 70'

Churchill Park, Lautoka
Referee: Wayne Barnes (England)

Team details

FB	15	Manasa Mataele	(substituted off) 53'
RW	14	Josua Tuisova
OC	13	Seta Tamanivalu
IC	12	Levani Botia (c)
LW	11	Vinaya Habosi
FH	10	Teti Tela	(substituted off) 40'
SH	9	Frank Lomani	(substituted off) 80'
N8	8	Albert Tuisue	(substituted off) 30'
OF	7	Rusiate Nasove
BF	6	Mesu Kunavula
RL	5	Api Ratuniyarawa
LL	4	Isoa Nasilasila	(substituted off) 51'
TP	3	Manasa Saulo	(substituted off) 51'
HK	2	Sam Matavesi	(substituted off) 70'
LP	1	Haereiti Hetet	(substituted off) 58'
Replacements:
HK	16	Mesu Dolokoto	(substituted in) 70'
PR	17	Eroni Mawi	(substituted in) 58'
PR	18	Mesake Doge	(substituted in) 51'
LK	19	Temo Mayanavanua	(substituted in) 51'
FL	20	Kitione Kamikamica	(substituted in) 30'
SH	21	Ratu Peni Matawalu	(substituted in) 80'
CE	22	Vilimoni Botitu	(substituted in) 53'
FH	23	Ben Volavola	(substituted in) 40'
Coach:
(New Zealand) Vern Cotter

FB	15	Jock Campbell
RW	14	Dylan Pietsch
OC	13	Hudson Creighton
IC	12	Lalakai Foketi	(substituted off) 79'
LW	11	Filipo Daugunu	(substituted off) 72'
FH	10	Ben Donaldson
SH	9	Ryan Lonergan (c)
N8	8	Langi Gleeson	(substituted off) 59'
OF	7	Fraser McReight
BF	6	Seru Uru
RL	5	Ryan Smith
LL	4	Hugh Sinclair	(substituted off) 50'
TP	3	Tom Robertson	(substituted off) 67'
HK	2	Matt Faessler	(substituted off) 60'
LP	1	Matt Gibbon	(substituted off) 50'
Replacements:
HK	16	Feleti Kaitu'u	(substituted in) 60'
PR	17	Harry Hoopert	(substituted in) 50'
PR	18	Archer Holz	(substituted in) 67'
LK	19	Jeremy Williams	(substituted in) 50'
LK	20	Jackson Pugh	(substituted in) 59'
SH	21	James Tuttle
CE	22	Isaac Henry	(substituted in) 79'
WG	23	Mark Nawaqanitawase	(substituted in) 72'
Coach:
(Australia) Jason Gilmore

Assistant referees:
Christophe Ridley (England)
Reuben Keane (Australia)

=== Round 3 ===
16 July 2022
13:00 FJT (UTC+12)

Tonga	22–39	Australia A (1 BP)
Try: Moli (2) 3' m, 51' c Fonokalafi 69' c Con: Havili (2/3) 52', 70'; Pen: Havili (1/2) 39'	Report	Try: Daugunu (2) 14' m, 60' c Gleeson 41' c Stewart 45' c Tuttle 73' c Con: Lonergan (3/4) 42', 46', 61'; Donaldson (1/1) 74'; Pen: Lonergan (2/2) 6', 37'

Churchill Park, Lautoka
Referee: Brendon Pickerill (New Zealand)

Team details

FB	15	Otumaka Mausia
RW	14	Tima Fainga'anuku
OC	13	Afusipa Taumoepeau
IC	12	Fetuli Paea
LW	11	Anzelo Tuitavuki		(substituted off) 59'
FH	10	William Havili
SH	9	Manu Paea		(substituted off) 63'
N8	8	Lotu Inisi		(substituted off) 53'
OF	7	Solomone Funaki
BF	6	Semisi Paea		(substituted off) 57'
RL	5	Sam Lousi
LL	4	Leva Fifita (c)
TP	3	Ben Tameifuna		(substituted off) 53'
HK	2	Sam Moli		(substituted off) 63'
LP	1	David Lolohea		(substituted off) 63'
Replacements:
HK	16	Jay Fonokalafi		(substituted in) 63'
PR	17	Feao Fotuaika		(substituted in) 53'
PR	18	Joe Apikotoa		(substituted in) 63'
FL	19	Sione Talitui		(substituted in) 53'
LK	20	Veikoso Poloniati		(substituted in) 57'
SH	21	Aisea Halo	(yellow card) 72'	(substituted in) 63'
FH	22	James Faiva
FB	23	Telusa Veainu		(substituted in) 59'
Coach:
(Australia) Toutai Kefu

FB	15	Jock Campbell
RW	14	Dylan Pietsch
OC	13	Hudson Creighton
IC	12	Lalakai Foketi	(substituted off) 40'
LW	11	Filipo Daugunu	(substituted off) 71'
FH	10	Ben Donaldson
SH	9	Ryan Lonergan (c)	(substituted off) 64'
N8	8	Langi Gleeson
OF	7	Fraser McReight
BF	6	Will Harris	(substituted off) 49'
RL	5	Seru Uru	(substituted off) 54'
LL	4	Hugh Sinclair
TP	3	Tom Robertson	(substituted off) 64'
HK	2	Billy Pollard	(substituted off) 54'
LP	1	Matt Gibbon	(substituted off) 40'
Replacements:
HK	16	Matt Faessler	(substituted in) 54'
PR	17	Harry Hoopert	(substituted in) 40'
PR	18	Tom Ross	(substituted in) 64'
LK	19	Jeremy Williams	(substituted in) 54'
LK	20	Tim Anstee	(substituted in) 49'
SH	21	James Tuttle	(substituted in) 64'
FH	22	Tane Edmed	(substituted in) 71'
CE	23	Hamish Stewart	(substituted in) 40'
Coach:
(Australia) Jason Gilmore

Assistant referees:
Mike Fraser (New Zealand)
Tevita Rokovereni (Fiji)

16 July 2022
15:30 FJT (UTC+12)

(1 BP) Fiji	20–23	Samoa
Try: Tuisue 20' c Lomani 30' c Con: Volavola (2/2) 21', 32'; Pen: Volavola (2/3) 40', 51'	Report	Try: Lam (2) 43' c, 70' c Con: Iona (2/2) 44', 71'; Pen: Iona (3/4) 14', 55', 64'

Churchill Park, Lautoka
Referee: Jordan Way (Australia)

Team details

FB	15	Seta Tuicuvu
RW	14	Jiuta Wainiqolo	(substituted off) 69'
OC	13	Waisea Nayacalevu (c)
IC	12	Vilimoni Botitu	(substituted off) 63'
LW	11	Vinaya Habosi
FH	10	Ben Volavola
SH	9	Frank Lomani	(substituted off) 72'
N8	8	Albert Tuisue
OF	7	Rusiate Nasove	(substituted off) 72'
BF	6	Isoa Nasilasila
RL	5	Temo Mayanavanua
LL	4	Api Ratuniyarawa	(substituted off) 60'
TP	3	Manasa Saulo	(substituted off) 58'
HK	2	Sam Matavesi	(substituted off) 63'
LP	1	Eroni Mawi	(substituted off) 58'
Replacements:
HK	16	Tevita Ikanivere	(substituted in) 63'
PR	17	Haereiti Hetet	(substituted in) 58'
PR	18	Luke Tagi	(substituted in) 58'
HK	19	Mesu Dolokoto	(substituted in) 72'
FL	20	Kitione Kamikamica	(substituted in) 60'
SH	21	Ratu Peni Matawalu	(substituted in) 72'
CE	22	Seta Tamanivalu	(substituted in) 63'
WG	23	Josua Tuisova	(substituted in) 69'
Coach:
(New Zealand) Vern Cotter

FB	15	Danny Toala
RW	14	Neria Fomai
OC	13	Tumua Manu	(substituted off) 58'
IC	12	D'Angelo Leuila
LW	11	Nigel Ah Wong	(substituted off) 57'
FH	10	Rodney Iona
SH	9	Ere Enari	(substituted off) 54'
N8	8	Fritz Lee	(substituted off) 72'
OF	7	Jordan Taufua
BF	6	Olajuwon Noah	(substituted off) 61'
RL	5	Chris Vui
LL	4	Theo McFarland
TP	3	Michael Alaalatoa (c)	(substituted off) 58'
HK	2	Ray Niuia	(substituted off) 40'
LP	1	Aki Seiuli	(substituted off) 40'
Replacements:
HK	16	Seilala Lam	(substituted in) 40'
PR	17	Ezekiel Lindenmuth	(substituted in) 40'
PR	18	Kalolo Tuiloma	(substituted in) 58'
LK	19	Michael Curry	(substituted in) 61'
FL	20	Henry Stowers	(substituted in) 72'
SH	21	Jonathan Taumateine	(substituted in) 54'
CE	22	Henry Taefu	(substituted in) 58'
FB	23	Lolagi Visinia	(substituted in) 57'
Coach:
(Samoa) Seilala Mapusua

Assistant referees:
Dan Waenga (New Zealand)
Reuben Keane (Australia)

Notes:

- Michael Curry (Samoa) made his international debut.
- This is the first time that Samoa has beaten Fiji since 2014.

== Player statistics ==
=== Most points ===
Pos	Name	Team	Pts
1	Ryan Lonergan	Australia A	33
2	Rodney Iona	Samoa	19
3	Filipo Daugunu	Australia A	15
3	Ray Niuia	Samoa	15
3	Seilala Lam	Samoa	15
6	Teti Tela	Fiji	11
7	Nigel Ah Wong	Samoa	10
7	Fraser McReight	Australia A	10
7	Sam Moli	Tonga	10
7	James Tuttle	Australia A	10
7	Ben Volavola	Fiji	10

=== Most tries ===
Pos	Name	Team	Tries
1	Filipo Daugunu	Australia A	3
1	Ray Niuia	Samoa	3
1	Seilala Lam	Samoa	3
4	Nigel Ah Wong	Samoa	2
4	Fraser McReight	Australia A	2
4	Sam Moli	Tonga	2
4	James Tuttle	Australia A	2

== Squads ==
Nation	Head coach	Captain
Australia A	(Australia) Jason Gilmore	Ryan Lonergan
Fiji	(New Zealand) Vern Cotter	Waisea Nayacalevu
Samoa	(Samoa) Seilala Mapusua	Michael Alaalatoa
Tonga	(Australia) Toutai Kefu	Sonatane Takulua

Note: Number of caps and players' ages are indicated as of 2 July 2022 – the tournament's opening day, pre first tournament match.

=== Australia A ===
On 15 June, Australia A named a 29-man squad for the 2022 World Rugby Pacific Nations Cup.

On 17 June, Hugh Sinclair joined the squad to replace Ryan McCauley who withdrew from the squad, whilst James Tuttle also joined the squad.

On 20 June, Harry Johnson-Holmes joined up with the Wallabies squad for their test series against England.

On 24 June, Ned Hanigan joined up with the Wallabies squad as injury cover for Jed Holloway.

As a result of Johnson-Holmes Wallabies called up and subsequent injury, Archer Holz was called up to the squad. Hudson Creighton also joined up with the squad.

On 5 July, Reece Hodge joined up with the Wallabies, with Lawson Creighton replacing Hodge in the 'A' side.

Player	Position	Date of birth (age)	Caps	Club/province
Matt Faessler	Hooker	21 December 1998 (aged 23)	0	Reds
Feleti Kaitu'u	Hooker	30 December 1994 (aged 27)	3	Western Force
Billy Pollard	Hooker	9 December 2001 (aged 20)	0	Brumbies
Feao Fotuaika	Prop	23 April 1993 (aged 29)	0	Reds
Matt Gibbon	Prop	3 June 1995 (aged 27)	0	Rebels
Archer Holz	Prop	2000	0	Brumbies
Harry Hoopert	Prop	16 September 1998 (aged 23)	0	Reds
Harry Johnson-Holmes	Prop	2 March 1997 (aged 25)	1	Waratahs
Tom Robertson	Prop	28 August 1994 (aged 27)	26	Western Force
Ned Hanigan	Lock	11 April 1995 (aged 27)	25	Waratahs
Ryan McCauley	Lock	8 June 1997 (aged 25)	0	Western Force
Jackson Pugh	Lock	3 February 2000 (aged 22)	0	Western Force
Ryan Smith	Lock	30 September 1996 (aged 25)	0	Reds
Tim Anstee	Back row	19 May 1997 (aged 25)	0	Western Force
Langi Gleeson	Back row	21 July 2001 (age 24)	0	Waratahs
Will Harris	Back row	8 June 2000 (aged 22)	0	Waratahs
Hugh Sinclair	Back row	22 September 1992 (aged 29)	0	Waratahs
Fraser McReight	Back row	19 February 1999 (aged 23)	2	Reds
Seru Uru	Back row	3 January 1997 (aged 25)	0	Reds
Ryan Lonergan (c)	Scrum-half	6 April 1995 (aged 27)	0	Brumbies
James Tuttle	Scrum-half	13 May 1996 (aged 26)	0	Rebels
Ben Donaldson	Fly-half	4 April 1999 (aged 23)	0	Waratahs
Tane Edmed	Fly-half	16 August 2000 (aged 21)	0	Waratahs
Hudson Creighton	Centre		0	Reds
Lalakai Foketi	Centre	22 December 1994 (aged 27)	1	Waratahs
Hamish Stewart	Centre	3 March 1998 (aged 24)	0	Reds
Filipo Daugunu	Wing	3 February 1995 (aged 27)	7	Reds
Andy Muirhead	Wing	8 July 1993 (aged 28)	7	Brumbies
Mark Nawaqanitawase	Wing	11 September 2000 (aged 21)	0	Waratahs
Dylan Pietsch	Wing	23 April 1998 (aged 24)	0	Waratahs
Jock Campbell	Fullback	17 May 1995 (aged 27)	0	Reds
Lawson Creighton	Fullback	21 July 1998 (aged 23)	0	Reds
Reece Hodge	Fullback	26 August 1994 (aged 27)	54	Rebels
Jake Strachan	Fullback	25 December 1996 (aged 25)	0	Western Force

=== Fiji ===
On 6 June, a 34-man squad was named for the 2022 World Rugby Pacific Nations Cup.

On 29 June, Kitione Kamikamica joined up with the squad as cover for Te Ahiwaru Cirikidaveta.

Player	Position	Date of birth (age)	Caps	Club/province
Mesu Dolokoto	Hooker	21 January 1995 (aged 27)	10	(Fiji) Fijian Drua
Tevita Ikanivere	Hooker	6 September 1999 (aged 22)	1	(Fiji) Fijian Drua
Sam Matavesi	Hooker	13 January 1992 (aged 30)	20	(England) Northampton Saints
Mesake Doge	Prop	4 January 1993 (aged 29)	7	(Wales) Dragons
Haereiti Hetet	Prop	10 July 1997 (aged 24)	2	(Fiji) Fijian Drua
Eroni Mawi	Prop	2 June 1996 (aged 26)	17	(England) Saracens
Manasa Saulo	Prop	6 May 1989 (aged 33)	47	(Fiji) Fijian Drua
Luke Tagi	Prop	23 June 1997 (aged 25)	4	(France) Provence
Temo Mayanavanua	Lock	9 November 1997 (aged 24)	5	(France) Lyon
Isoa Nasilasila	Lock	13 September 1999 (aged 22)	0	(Fiji) Fijian Drua
Tevita Ratuva	Lock	8 May 1995 (aged 27)	11	(France) Brive
Api Ratuniyarawa	Lock	11 July 1986 (aged 35)	38	(England) Northampton Saints
Ratu Leone Rotuisolia	Lock	21 February 1998 (aged 24)	0	(Fiji) Fijian Drua
Levani Botia	Back row	14 March 1989 (aged 33)	21	(France) La Rochelle
Te Ahiwaru Cirikidaveta	Back row	12 April 1998 (aged 24)	0	(Fiji) Fijian Drua
Kitione Kamikamica	Back row	27 April 1996 (aged 26)	1	(France) Racing 92
Mesu Kunavula	Back row	31 October 1995 (aged 26)	6	(Scotland) Edinburgh
Rusiate Nasove	Back row	27 October 1995 (aged 26)	0	(Fiji) Fijian Drua
Albert Tuisue	Back row	6 June 1993 (aged 29)	13	(England) London Irish
Simione Kuruvoli	Scrum-half	2 January 1999 (aged 23)	2	(Fiji) Fijian Drua
Frank Lomani	Scrum-half	18 April 1996 (aged 26)	19	(Fiji) Fijian Drua
Ratu Peni Matawalu	Scrum-half	8 July 1997 (aged 24)	0	(Fiji) Fijian Drua
Teti Tela	Fly-half	7 March 1991 (aged 31)	1	(Fiji) Fijian Drua
Ben Volavola	Fly-half	13 January 1991 (aged 31)	42	(France) Racing 92
Vilimoni Botitu	Centre	15 June 1998 (aged 24)	3	(France) Castres Olympique
Waisea Nayacalevu (c)	Centre	26 June 1990 (aged 32)	28	(France) Stade Français
Kalaveti Ravouvou	Centre	6 June 1998 (aged 24)	0	(Fiji) Fijian Drua
Seta Tamanivalu	Centre	23 July 1992 (aged 29)	0	(Japan) Toshiba Brave Lupus Tokyo
Apisalome Vota	Centre	6 October 1996 (aged 25)	0	(Fiji) Fijian Drua
Vinaya Habosi	Wing	30 January 2000 (aged 22)	0	(Fiji) Fijian Drua
Josua Tuisova	Wing	4 February 1994 (aged 28)	17	(France) Lyon
Manasa Mataele	Wing	27 November 1996 (aged 25)	2	(Australia) Western Force
Jiuta Wainiqolo	Wing	10 March 1999 (aged 23)	1	(France) Toulon
Ilaisa Droasese	Fullback	13 September 1999 (aged 22)	0	(Fiji) Fijian Drua
Seta Tuicuvu	Fullback	7 September 1995 (aged 26)	7	(France) Brive

=== Samoa ===
On 2 June, the following 30 players were called up for the 2022 World Rugby Pacific Nations Cup with Olajuwon Noah later being added to the squad.

Player	Position	Date of birth (age)	Caps	Club/province
Seilala Lam	Hooker	18 February 1989 (aged 33)	17	(France) Perpignan
Ray Niuia	Hooker	19 June 1991 (aged 31)	10	(New Zealand) Moana Pasifika
Andrew Tuala	Hooker	9 March 1991 (aged 31)	0	(United States) LA Giltinis
Michael Alaalatoa (c)	Prop	28 August 1991 (aged 30)	7	(Ireland) Leinster
Sef Fa'agase	Prop	5 March 1991 (aged 31)	0	(Australia) Queensland Reds
Marco Fepulea'i	Prop	25 April 1995 (aged 27)	0	(United States) LA Giltinis
Aki Seiuli	Prop	22 December 1992 (aged 29)	0	(Wales) Dragons
Kalolo Tuiloma	Prop	24 June 1990 (aged 32)	2	(United States) Rugby New York
Michael Curry	Lock	2 March 1994 (aged 28)	0	(New Zealand) Moana Pasifika
Theo McFarland	Lock	16 October 1995 (aged 26)	2	(England) Saracens
Sam Slade	Lock	28 August 1997 (aged 24)	2	(New Zealand) Moana Pasifika
Chris Vui	Lock	11 February 1993 (aged 29)	18	(England) Bristol Bears
Jack Lam	Back row	18 November 1987 (aged 34)	40	(New Zealand) Moana Pasifika
Fritz Lee	Back row	29 August 1988 (aged 33)	0	(France) Clermont
Alamanda Motuga	Back row	11 September 1994 (aged 27)	3	(New Zealand) Moana Pasifika
Olajuwon Noah	Back row	28 December 1989 (aged 32)	2	(South Africa) Sharks
Henry Stowers	Back row	3 March 1995 (aged 27)	4	(New Zealand) Moana Pasifika
Jordan Taufua	Back row	29 January 1992 (aged 30)	0	(France) Lyon
Ere Enari	Scrum-half	30 May 1997 (aged 25)	0	(New Zealand) Moana Pasifika
Auvasa Faleali'i	Scrum-half	9 February 1990 (aged 32)	5	(New Zealand) Papatoetoe
Jonathan Taumateine	Scrum-half	28 September 1996 (aged 25)	2	(New Zealand) Moana Pasifika
AJ Alatimu	Fly-half	25 March 1993 (aged 29)	6	(United States) Seattle Seawolves
Rodney Iona	Fly-half	17 August 1991 (aged 30)	5	(Australia) Brumbies
D'Angelo Leuila	Fly-half	18 January 1997 (aged 25)	14	(New Zealand) Moana Pasifika
Nigel Ah Wong	Centre	30 May 1990 (aged 32)	0	(New Zealand) Blues
Duncan Paia'aua	Centre	20 January 1995 (aged 27)	0	(France) Toulon
Henry Taefu	Centre	2 April 1993 (aged 29)	9	(New Zealand) Moana Pasifika
Danny Toala	Centre	26 March 1999 (aged 23)	0	(New Zealand) Moana Pasifika
Ed Fidow	Wing	11 September 1993 (aged 28)	14	(United States) Rugby New York
Neria Fomai	Wing	3 February 1992 (aged 30)	2	(New Zealand) Moana Pasifika
Lolagi Visinia	Fullback	17 January 1993 (aged 29)	0	(New Zealand) Moana Pasifika

=== Tonga ===
On 27 May, the following 31 players were called up for the 2022 World Rugby Pacific Nations Cup as well as the 2023 Rugby World Cup Asia/Pacific play-off qualifier.

On 3 June, Sione Havili was called up to the squad.

On the 16th of June, Lopeti Timani was called up to the squad.

Feao Fotuaika, Semisi Paea, Otumaka Mausia, Aisea Halo, and Telusa Veainu were called up to the squad.

Player	Position	Date of birth (age)	Caps	Club/province
Jay Fonokalafi	Hooker	9 December 1995 (aged 26)	2	(New Zealand) Takapuna
Siua Maile	Hooker	18 February 1997 (aged 25)	9	(New Zealand) Hurricanes
Sam Moli	Hooker	24 December 1998 (aged 23)	3	(New Zealand) Moana Pasifika
Joe Apikotoa	Prop	18 July 1996 (aged 25)	0	(New Zealand) Moana Pasifika
Siegfried Fisi'ihoi	Prop	8 June 1987 (aged 35)	15	(France) Pau
Tau Koloamatangi	Prop	3 January 1995 (aged 27)	0	(New Zealand) Moana Pasifika
David Lolohea	Prop	26 February 1992 (aged 30)	2	(France) Provence
Ben Tameifuna	Prop	30 August 1991 (aged 30)	18	(France) Bordeaux
Siate Tokolahi	Prop	16 March 1992 (aged 30)	0	(France) Pau
Feao Fotuaika	Prop	23 April 1993 (aged 29)	0	(Australia) Reds
Leva Fifita	Lock	29 July 1989 (aged 32)	22	(Ireland) Connacht
Sam Lousi	Lock	20 July 1991 (aged 30)	8	(Wales) Scarlets
Veikoso Poloniati	Lock	27 August 1995 (aged 26)	0	(New Zealand) Moana Pasifika
Semisi Paea	Lock		0	(New Zealand) Bay of Plenty
Solomone Funaki	Back row	25 April 1994 (aged 28)	1	(New Zealand) Moana Pasifika
Tanginoa Halaifonua	Back row	20 September 1996 (aged 25)	2	(France) Grenoble
Sione Havili	Back row	25 January 1998 (aged 24)	0	(New Zealand) Crusaders
Lotu Inisi	Back row	26 April 1999 (aged 23)	0	(New Zealand) Moana Pasifika
Viliami Taulani	Back row	17 January 1997 (aged 25)	4	(England) Harlequins
Sione Tuipulotu	Back row	2 December 1997 (aged 24)	4	(New Zealand) Moana Pasifika
Manu Paea	Scrum-half	17 September 2001 (aged 20)	0	(New Zealand) Moana Pasifika
Augustine Pulu	Scrum-half	4 January 1990 (aged 32)	0	(Japan) Hino Red Dolphins
Aisea Halo	Scrum-half	29 June 1993 (aged 29)	2	(New Zealand) North Harbour
Sonatane Takulua (c)	Scrum-half	11 January 1991 (aged 31)	45	(France) Agen
James Faiva	Fly-half	13 June 1994 (aged 28)	15	(Italy) Petrarca
William Havili	Fly-half	9 September 1998 (aged 23)	0	(New Zealand) Moana Pasifika
Malakai Fekitoa	Centre	10 May 1992 (aged 30)	0	(England) Wasps
Fine Inisi	Centre	19 May 1998 (aged 24)	4	(New Zealand) Moana Pasifika
Fetuli Paea	Centre	16 August 1994 (aged 27)	2	(New Zealand) Highlanders
Afusipa Taumoepeau	Centre	26 January 1990 (aged 32)	2	(France) Perpignan
Tima Fainga'anuku	Wing	26 April 1997 (aged 25)	0	(New Zealand) Moana Pasifika
Solomone Kata	Wing	3 December 1994 (aged 27)	2	(New Zealand) Moana Pasifika
Anzelo Tuitavuki	Wing	10 October 1998 (aged 23)	0	(New Zealand) Moana Pasifika
Otumaka Mausia	Wing	22 April 1997 (aged 25)	1	(New Zealand) Auckland
Israel Folau	Fullback	3 April 1989 (aged 33)	0	(Japan) Shining Arcs
Charles Piutau	Fullback	31 October 1991 (aged 30)	0	(England) Bristol Bears
Telusa Veainu	Fullback	26 December 1990 (aged 31)	13	(France) Stade Français

== See also ==
- 2022 July rugby union tests
