= 2026–27 Benetton Rugby season =

Benetton Treviso
- 2026–27 season
- Head coach: Wayne Pivac

The 2026–27 season is Benetton Rugby's upcoming sixth season in the United Rugby Championship, and 17th in all formats of the competition. It will be the 94th season of senior men's rugby at the club since its foundation. Along with competing in the URC and its Scottish Italian Shield competition, the club will also participate in European competition for the 32nd season, in the 2026–27 EPCR Challenge Cup.

== Squad and management ==
Former Wales head coach Wayne Pivac arrives as the new head coach at Benetton Treviso for the 2026–27 campaign.

=== Transfers ===
The end-of-season releases were dominated by the news of the departure of Italy national team centre Tommaso Menoncello to French giant Toulouse, with the return of Italy-born South African Jean Smith, son of former Springbok Franco Smith, to his first club, and his potential switch to play for the Azzurri ahead of the 2027 Rugby World Cup, the most notable incoming story.

=== Players in ===
- (Australia) Louis Werchon from (Australia) Queensland Reds
- (South Africa) Jean Smith from (South Africa) Sharks
- (Argentina) Gonzalo Hughes from (France) Périgueux
- (New Zealand) Isaia Walker-Leawere from (New Zealand) Hurricanes
- (Australia) Josh Flook from (Australia) Queensland Reds
- (Argentina) Matias Medrano from (Argentina) Pampas XV
- (Italy) François Carlo Mey from (France) Soyaux Angoulême

=== Players out ===
- (Italy) Tommaso Menoncello to (France) Toulouse
- (Zimbabwe) Eli Snyman to (Ireland) Ulster
- (Argentina) Thomas Gallo to (France) Lyon
- (Australia) Scott Scrafton (retired)
- (Argentina) Nahuel Tetaz Chaparro (retired)
- (Argentina) Nicolás Roger to (Argentina) Dogos XV
- (Fiji) Simon Koroiyadi to (England) Nottingham
- (Tonga) Malakai Fekitoa to (France) Beziers

== United Rugby Championship ==
=== Matches ===
Benetton Rugby will begin their sixth URC campaign on 25 September 2026 with a home tie against Welsh side Dragons.

25 September	Benetton (Italy)	19–19	(Wales) Dragons	Stadio Monigo, Treviso
	Try: Mey 12' c Bernasconi 24' c Mendy 40' m Con: Umaga (2/3) 13', 25'	Report; Scorecard; Highlights	Try: de Beer 27' c Inisi 44' c Dee 78' m Con: de Beer (2/3) 28', 45'	Attendance: 4,217; Referee: Christopher Allison (South Africa)

2 October	Benetton (Italy)	19–22	(Ireland) Connacht (1 BP)	Stadio Monigo, Treviso
	Try: Bernasconi (2) 11' m, 51' c Marin 34' c Con: Umaga (2/3) 35', 52'	Report; Scorecard; Highlights	Try: Prendergast 5' m O'Brien 16' m Frawley (2) 37' c, 77' m Con: Gilbert (1/4) 38'; Cards: Bealham (yellow card) 39'	Attendance: 4,946; Referee: Hollie Davidson (Scotland)

10 October	(1 BP) Scarlets (Wales)	27–26	(Italy) Benetton (2 BP)	Parc y Scarlets, Llanelli
	Try: Lousi 4' c Murray 53' c Mee (2) 56' m, 65' m Con: Costelow (2/4) 5', 54'; Pen: Costelow 79'	Report; Scorecard; Highlights	Try: Maile 10' c Ratave 24' c Lamaro 38' c Lynagh 73' m Con: Umaga (3/4) 11', 24', 39'	Attendance: 6,026; Referee: Peter Martin

24 October	(1 BP) Benetton (Italy)	20–24	(Scotland) Glasgow Warriors (1 BP)	Stadio Monigo, Treviso
	Try: Zanandrea 30' c Lynagh 42' c Con: Umaga (2/2) 31', 43'; Pen: Umaga (2) 41', 69'; Cards: Midena (yellow card) 46'	Report; Scorecard; Highlights	Try: Ferrie 50' c Steyn 53'm Darge 56' m Oguntibeju 78' c Con: Urwin (1/3) 51'; Kuenzle (1/1) 79'	Attendance: 5,000; Referee: Griffen Colby (South Africa)

31 October 2026	Benetton (Italy)	v	(Scotland) Edinburgh	Stadio Monigo, Treviso

5 December 2026	Glasgow Warriors (Scotland)	v	(Italy) Benetton	Scotstoun Stadium

19 December 2026	Zebre Parma (Italy)	v	(Italy) Benetton	Stadio Sergio Lanfranchi

27 December 2026	Benetton (Italy)	v	(Italy) Zebre Parma	Stadio Monigo, Treviso

2 January 2027	Edinburgh (Scotland)	v	(Italy) Benetton	Edinburgh Rugby Stadium

23 January 2027	Benetton (Italy)	v	(South Africa) Bulls	Stadio Monigo, Treviso

30 January 2027	Benetton (Italy)	v	(South Africa) Sharks	Stadio Monigo, Treviso

26 February 2027	Munster (Ireland)	v	(Italy) Benetton	Musgrave Park, Cork

20 March 2027	Leinster (Ireland)	v	(Italy) Benetton	RDS Arena, Dublin

27 March 2027	Benetton (Italy)	v	(Ireland) Ulster	Stadio Monigo, Treviso

17 April 2027	Stormers (South Africa)	v	(Italy) Benetton	Cape Town Stadium

24 April 2027	Lions (South Africa)	v	(Italy) Benetton	Ellis Park Stadium, Jo'burg

8 May 2027	Benetton (Italy)	v	(Wales) Cardiff	Stadio Monigo, Treviso

14 May 2027	Ospreys (Wales)	v	(Italy) Benetton	St Helen's, Swansea

=== Standings ===
Pos	Team	Pld	W	D	L	PF	PA	PD	TF	TA	TB	LB	Pts	Qualification
1	Edinburgh	4	4	0	0	111	64	+47	15	8	3	0	19	Qualification for the Champions Cup and knockout stage
2	Glasgow Warriors	4	3	1	0	119	92	+27	18	12	4	0	18	Qualification for the Champions Cup and knockout stage
3	Bulls	4	3	0	1	160	90	+70	23	11	3	1	16	Qualification for the Champions Cup and knockout stage
4	Stormers	4	3	0	1	133	94	+39	19	13	3	1	16	Qualification for the Champions Cup and knockout stage
5	Sharks	4	3	0	1	125	104	+21	18	16	3	0	15	Qualification for the Champions Cup and knockout stage
6	Leinster	4	2	0	2	99	76	+23	16	10	3	2	13	Qualification for the Champions Cup and knockout stage
7	Ospreys	4	2	0	2	112	121	−9	18	17	3	0	11	Qualification for the Champions Cup and knockout stage
8	Connacht	4	2	0	2	104	111	−7	17	17	2	0	10	Qualification for the Champions Cup and knockout stage
9	Munster	4	1	1	2	90	98	−8	12	15	2	2	10	Qualification for the Challenge Cup
10	Cardiff	4	2	0	2	87	107	−20	13	17	1	0	9	Qualification for the Challenge Cup
11	Lions	4	2	0	2	87	133	−46	12	21	1	0	9	Qualification for the Challenge Cup
12	Ulster	4	0	2	2	114	127	−13	17	17	4	1	9	Qualification for the Challenge Cup
13	Dragons	4	1	1	2	102	114	−12	15	18	2	1	9	Qualification for the Challenge Cup
14	Scarlets	4	1	0	3	108	137	−29	16	21	3	1	8	Qualification for the Challenge Cup
15	Benetton	4	0	1	3	84	92	−8	12	15	1	3	6	Qualification for the Challenge Cup
16	Zebre	4	0	0	4	79	164	−85	12	25	2	0	2	Qualification for the Challenge Cup

Updated to match(es) played on 23 October 2026. Source: UnitedRugby.com
Rules for classification: Tiebreakers for teams tied on points: 1) Number of matches won 2) The difference between points for and points against 3) The number of tries scored 4) The most points scored 5) The difference between tries for and tries against 6) The fewest red cards received 7) The fewest yellow cards received.

=== URC Scottish-Italian Shield ===
2026–27 United Rugby Championship Regional Shield tables
(Italy) (Scotland) Italian x Scottish Shield
	Team	P	W	D	L	PF	PA	PD	TF	TA	TBP	LBP	Pts	Pos overall
1	(Scotland) Edinburgh	1	1	0	0	29	12	+17	4	2	1	0	6	1
2	(Italy) Benetton	0	0	0	0	0	0	0	0	0	0	0	0	15
2	(Scotland) Glasgow Warriors	0	0	0	0	0	0	0	0	0	0	0	0	2
4	(Italy) Zebre Parma	1	0	0	1	12	29	-17	2	4	0	0	0	16
If teams are level at any stage, tiebreakers are applied in the following order: 1. number of matches won 2. the difference between points for and points against 3. the number of tries scored 4. the most points scored 5. the difference between tries for and tries against 6. the fewest red cards received 7. the fewest yellow cards received
Green background indicates teams currently leading the regional shield. Upon the conclusion of the regular season, these teams win their respective regional shields. (S) : URC Shield champion

== EPCR Challenge Cup ==
Having finished outside the top eight of the 2025–26 United Rugby Championship, Benetton qualified for the 2026–27 EPCR Challenge Cup. The pool stage draw will take place on 1 July 2026.
