= 2026–27 Ospreys (rugby union) season =

Ospreys
- 2026–27 season
- Head coach: Mark Jones

The 2026–27 season is the Ospreys' sixth season in the United Rugby Championship, and their 24th in all formats of the competition. As well as competing in the URC and its Welsh Shield competition, the region will also participate in the 2026–27 EPCR Challenge Cup. The Ospreys enter the 2026–27 URC Welsh Shield competition as champions, having won the title for a third time in 2025–26. The 2026–27 season also sees the Ospreys return to the upgraded St Helen's stadium in Swansea.

== Squad and management ==
=== Coaching ===
Mark Jones continues as head coach for the 2026–27 season

Role	Name
Head coach	Mark Jones
First team coach	Duncan Jones; Richard Fussell; Richard Kelly
Strength and conditioning (head)	Simon Church
Analysis (head)	Aled Griffiths
Rugby general manager	Dan Griffiths
Academy (senior)	Gareth Walters; Mike Ruddock

=== Transfers ===
The departure of Wales internationals Jac Morgan and Dewi Lake to English Premiership club Gloucester highlighted the ongoing uncertainty over the future of Welsh professional rugby.

=== Players in ===
- (Wales) Tom Rogers from (Wales) Scarlets
- (Wales) Dan John from (England) Exeter Chiefs
- (Australia) Liam Wright (unattached)
- (Australia) Lalakai Foketi from (New Zealand) Chiefs
- (Australia) Lawson Creighton from (Australia) NSW Waratahs
- (Australia) Marika Koroibete from (Japan) Saitama Wild Knights
- (Wales) Steff Jac Jones from (Wales) Scarlets
- (Wales) Louie Trevett from (England) Bristol Bears (short-term loan)

=== Players out ===
- (Wales) Jac Morgan to (England) Gloucester
- (Wales) Dewi Lake to (England) Gloucester
- (Wales) James Fender to (France) Grenoble
- (England) Phil Cokanasiga to (England) Gloucester
- (Australia) Jack Walsh to (France) Montauban
- (Wales) Connor Moyse to (England) London Scottish
- (New Zealand) Ieuan Cornelius to (Wales) RGC 1404
- (England) Max Nagy to (England) Ealing Trailfinders
- (Wales) Tom Florence to (England) Ealing Trailfinders
- (Wales) Luke Scully to (Wales) Swansea
- (Democratic Republic of the Congo) Daniel Kasende to (South Africa) Lions
- (Wales) Ryan Conbeer to (Wales) Bridgend Ravens
- (England) Will Greatbanks (retired)

== United Rugby Championship ==
=== Matches ===
Ospreys will begin their sixth URC campaign fulfilling its South African away fixtures for the season against Sharks and Lions, with its first home URC game in its refurbished St Helen's stadium being a URC Welsh Shield derby with East Wales rivals Dragons in Round 4.

26 September	(1 BP) Sharks (South Africa)	41–24	(Wales) Ospreys (1 BP)	Kings Park Stadium, Durban
	Try: Hatton 12' c Tshituka 22' c Giliomee (2) 28' c, 67' c Bester 37' c Con: Moyo (4/4) 13', 23', 29', 38'; Masuka (1/1) 68'; Pen: Moyo (2) 53', 56'	Report; Scorecard; Highlights	Try: Morgan 32' c Parry 45' m Wright 45' c Hopkins 71' m Con: Creighton (2/4) 33', 46'	Attendance: 11,330; Referee: Gianluca Gnecci (Italy)

3 October	(1 BP) Lions (South Africa)	35–19	(Wales) Ospreys	Ellis Park Stadium, Jo'burg
	Try: Cronje 28' c Botha 43' m Brandon 49' m Chamberlain 57' m Mpeku (2) 63' m, 66' m Con: C Smith (1/6) 28'; Pen: C Smith (1) 11'	Report; Scorecard; Highlights	Try: Williams 34' c Daniel 42' m Moriarty 82' c Con: Edwards (2/3) 35', 83'; Cards: Edwards (yellow card) 61'	Attendance: 3,426; Referee: Filippo Russo (Italy)

9 October	(2 BP) Dragons (Wales)	31–38	(Wales) Ospreys (1 BP)	Rodney Parade, Newport
	Try: Dee (2) 5' c, 50' c penalty try, 40+3'; Tuitavuki 56' c Con: de Beer (3/3) 6', 51', 57'; Pen: O'Brien 82'	Report; Scorecard; Highlights	Try: Moriarty 17' c Giles 35' m Parry (2) 46' c, 54' c Morris (2) 72' m, 79' c Con: Edwards (4/6) 18', 47', 55', 80'; Cards: Moriarty (yellow card) 42'	Attendance: 6,037; Referee: Robbie Jenkinson (Ireland)

24 October	(1 BP) Ospreys (Wales)	31–14	(Wales) Dragons	St Helen's, Swansea
	Try: Morgan-Williams (2) 6' c, 30' c Parry 36' m penalty try 42'; Moriarty 54' m Con: Edwards (2) 7', 31'	Report; Scorecard	Try: Dyer 43' c Tuitavuki 64' c Con: de Beer (2/2) 44', 65'; Cards: Williams (yellow card) 42' de Beer (yellow card) 54'; Owen (yellow card) 68'	Attendance: 5,592; Referee: Ben Whitehouse (Wales)

31 October 2026	Ospreys (Wales)	v	(Wales) Cardiff	St Helen's, Swansea

4 December 2026	Ospreys (Wales)	v	(Ireland) Leinster	St Helen's, Swansea

18 December 2026	Ulster (Ireland)	v	(Wales) Ospreys	Ravenhill Stadium, Belfast

26 December 2026	Ospreys (Wales)	v	(Wales) Scarlets	St Helen's, Swansea

2 January 2027	Cardiff (Wales)	v	(Wales) Ospreys	Cardiff Arms Park

23 January 2027	Ospreys (Wales)	v	(Scotland) Edinburgh	St Helen's, Swansea

29 January 2027	Glasgow Warriors (Scotland)	v	(Wales) Ospreys	Scotstoun Stadium

27 February 2027	Ospreys (Wales)	v	(Ireland) Connacht	St Helen's, Swansea

20 March 2027	Munster (Ireland)	v	(Wales) Ospreys	Thomond Park, Limerick

27 March 2027	Ospreys (Wales)	v	(South Africa) Stormers	St Helen's, Swansea

17 April 2027	Ospreys (Wales)	v	(South Africa) Bulls	St Helen's, Swansea

23 April 2027	Zebre Parma (Italy)	v	(Wales) Ospreys	Stadio Sergio Lanfranchi

8 May 2027	Scarlets (Wales)	v	(Wales) Ospreys	Parc y Scarlets, Llanelli

14 May 2027	Ospreys (Wales)	v	(Italy) Benetton	St Helen's, Swansea

=== Standings ===
Pos	Team	Pld	W	D	L	PF	PA	PD	TF	TA	TB	LB	Pts	Qualification
1	Glasgow Warriors	5	4	1	0	148	112	+36	22	15	5	0	23	Qualification for the Champions Cup and knockout stage
2	Edinburgh	4	4	0	0	111	64	+47	15	8	3	0	19	Qualification for the Champions Cup and knockout stage
3	Leinster	5	3	0	2	149	81	+68	23	11	4	2	18	Qualification for the Champions Cup and knockout stage
4	Bulls	4	3	0	1	160	90	+70	23	11	3	1	16	Qualification for the Champions Cup and knockout stage
5	Stormers	4	3	0	1	133	94	+39	19	13	3	1	16	Qualification for the Champions Cup and knockout stage
6	Sharks	4	3	0	1	125	104	+21	18	16	3	0	15	Qualification for the Champions Cup and knockout stage
7	Ospreys	4	2	0	2	112	121	−9	18	17	3	0	11	Qualification for the Champions Cup and knockout stage
8	Connacht	5	2	0	3	109	161	−52	18	24	2	0	10	Qualification for the Champions Cup and knockout stage
9	Munster	4	1	1	2	90	98	−8	12	15	2	2	10	Qualification for the Challenge Cup
10	Cardiff	4	2	0	2	87	107	−20	13	17	1	0	9	Qualification for the Challenge Cup
11	Lions	5	2	0	3	107	162	−55	15	25	1	0	9	Qualification for the Challenge Cup
12	Ulster	4	0	2	2	114	127	−13	17	17	4	1	9	Qualification for the Challenge Cup
13	Dragons	4	1	1	2	102	114	−12	15	18	2	1	9	Qualification for the Challenge Cup
14	Scarlets	4	1	0	3	108	137	−29	16	21	3	1	8	Qualification for the Challenge Cup
15	Benetton	4	0	1	3	84	92	−8	12	15	1	3	6	Qualification for the Challenge Cup
16	Zebre	4	0	0	4	79	164	−85	12	25	2	0	2	Qualification for the Challenge Cup

Updated to match(es) played on 23 October 2026. Source: UnitedRugby.com
Rules for classification: Tiebreakers for teams tied on points: 1) Number of matches won 2) The difference between points for and points against 3) The number of tries scored 4) The most points scored 5) The difference between tries for and tries against 6) The fewest red cards received 7) The fewest yellow cards received.

=== URC Welsh Shield ===
Ospreys enter the Welsh Shield as champions for the third time, having edged out Cardiff by a single point in the previous season.

2026–27 United Rugby Championship Regional Shield tables
(Wales) Welsh Shield
	Team	P	W	D	L	PF	PA	PD	TF	TA	TBP	LBP	Pts	Pos overall
1	(Wales) Dragons	2	1	0	1	69	64	+5	10	10	2	1	7	6
2	(Wales) Ospreys	1	1	0	0	38	31	+7	6	4	1	0	5	10
3	(Wales) Cardiff	1	1	0	0	21	15	+6	3	2	0	0	4	3
4	(Wales) Scarlets	2	0	0	2	41	59	–18	6	9	1	1	2	15
If teams are level at any stage, tiebreakers are applied in the following order: 1. number of matches won 2. the difference between points for and points against 3. the number of tries scored 4. the most points scored 5. the difference between tries for and tries against 6. the fewest red cards received 7. the fewest yellow cards received
Green background indicates teams currently leading the regional shield. Upon the conclusion of the regular season, these teams win their respective regional shields. (S) : URC Shield champion

== EPCR Challenge Cup ==
Having finished outside the top eight of the 2025–26 United Rugby Championship, the Ospreys qualified for the 2026–27 EPCR Challenge Cup. The pool stage draw will take place on 1 July 2026.
