= Inisi =

Inisi is a surname. Notable people with the surname include:

- Fine Inisi (born 1998), New Zealand rugby union player
- Lotu Inisi (born 1999), Tongan rugby union player
