= Ben Lam (rugby) =

Samoa international rugby union & league player

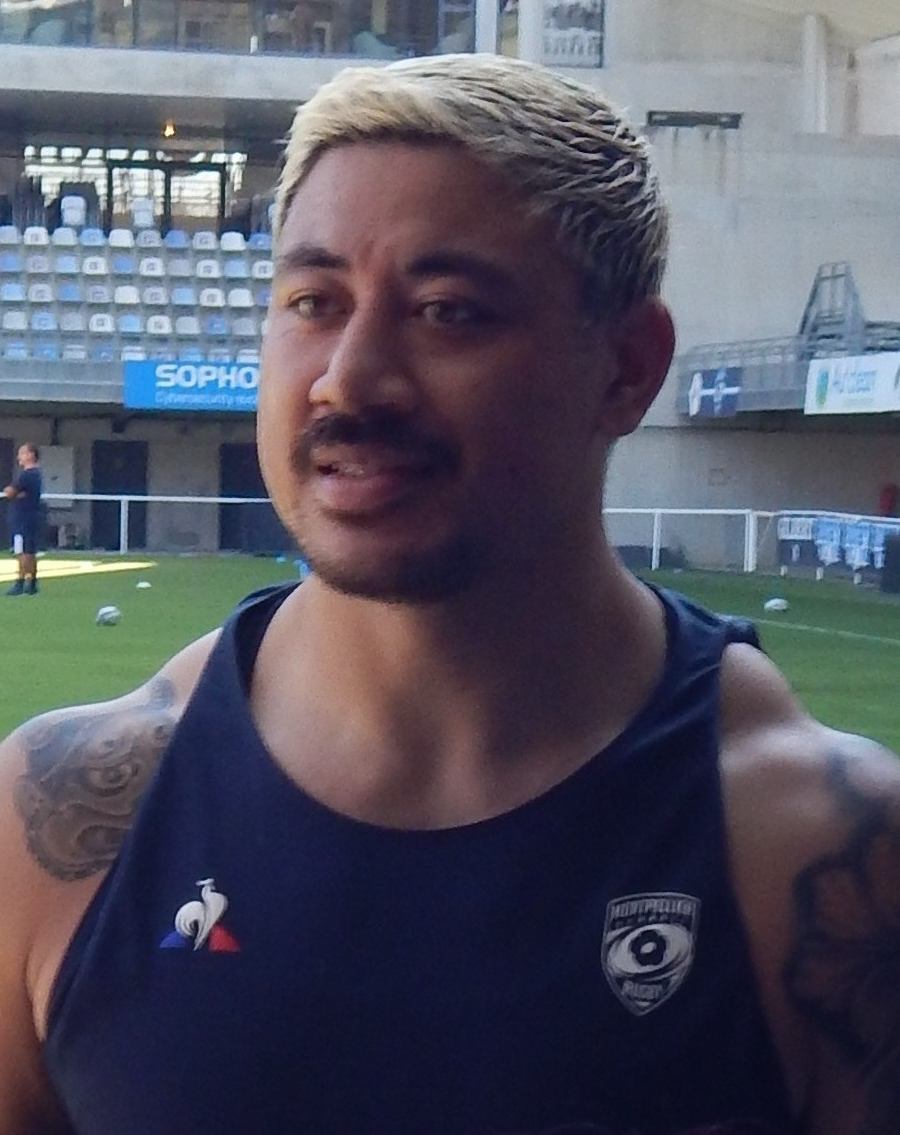
- Lam representing Montpellier during the Top 14
- Full name: Misimoa Benjamin Lam
- Born: 9 June 1991 (age 35) Auckland, New Zealand
- Height: 1.94 m (6 ft 4 in)
- Weight: 105 kg (231 lb; 16 st 7 lb)
- School: St. Peter's College
- Notable relative(s): Pat Lam (uncle); AJ Lam (brother); Jack Lam (cousin); Seilala Lam (cousin)

Rugby union career
- Position(s): Wing, Fullback
Senior career
| Years | Team | Apps | (Points) |
| 2012–2015 | Blues | 6 | (5) |
| 2012–2015 | Auckland | 30 | (50) |
| 2017–2020 | Hurricanes | 44 | (155) |
| 2017–2019 | Wellington | 28 | (70) |
| 2020–2022 | Bordeaux Bègles | 49 | (60) |
| 2022–2024 | Montpellier | 15 | (15) |
- Correct as of 19 January 2024
International career
| Years | Team | Apps | (Points) |
| 2023–2024 | Samoa | 3 | (0) |
- Correct as of 28 August 2023
National sevens team
| Years | Team | | Comps |
| 2012–2016 | New Zealand | | 16 |
- Correct as of 28 August 2023
- Rugby league career

Playing information
- Position: Wing, Centre
Club
| Years | Team | Pld | T | G | FG | P |
|---|---|---|---|---|---|---|
| 2024 | Catalans Dragons | 0 | 0 | 0 | 0 | 0 |
Medal record
Men's rugby sevens
Representing New Zealand
Commonwealth Games
| Silver medal – second place | 2014 Glasgow | Team competition |

Misimoa Benjamin Lam (born 9 June 1991) is a professional rugby league & former rugby union player who plays as a wing for Super League club Catalans Dragons. Born in New Zealand, he represented Samoa at international level after qualifying on ancestry grounds.

== Club career ==
=== Rugby Union ===
Lam played wing for Mitre 10 Cup team Auckland. He was selected for the Auckland and Blues sides in 2012. He played 12 games for Auckland after making his debut in 2012 against Hawke's Bay. He made one Super Rugby appearance for the Auckland Blues in 2012.

=== Rugby League ===
On 8 August 2024 it was reported that he had switched codes to join Catalans Dragons on a deal until the end on the 2024 season

He left Catalans in December 2024 after failing to secure a first team place. He made no appearances.

== International career ==
In November 2012 he entered into a contract as a New Zealand sevens player, making his debut at the Dubai Sevens. Lam won a silver Commonwealth Games Medal as a member of the All Black Sevens team at the Glasgow Commonwealth Games in 2014. Lam has international experience with the New Zealand Sevens. Since 2017 he has played for the Hurricanes.

== Personal life ==
Lam was born in Auckland, a nephew of rugby player Pat Lam. He was educated at St Peter's College, where he played rugby in the college First XV and excelled at athletics, principally in the 100 metres (breaking 11 seconds) and 200 metres, as well as the long jump. In Wellington, while giving his services to the Hurricanes franchise, Lam is completing his degree in Geography and Marine Biology and pursues his interest in underwater diving around Breaker Bay. He likes reading and he and other Hurricanes players Ardie Savea, Chris Eves and Blade Thomson have promoted a book club.
