= 2026–27 Cardiff Rugby season =

Cardiff Rugby
- 2026–27 season
- Head coach: Corniel van Zyl

The 2026–27 season is Cardiff Rugby's sixth season in the United Rugby Championship, and 26th in all formats of the competition. Along with competing in the URC and its Welsh Shield competition, the club will also participate in the 2026–27 European Rugby Champions Cup.

The season marks the 150th season of senior club rugby in Cardiff.

== Squad and management ==
Corniel van Zyl begins his first full season in charge at the Arms Park, following his hiring as head coach last season

=== Players in ===
- (Namibia) Le Roux Malan from (South Africa) Sharks
- (Samoa) Scott Sio from (England) Exeter Chiefs
- (Tonga) Semisi Paea from (New Zealand) Moana Pasifika
- (Wales) Jarrod Evans from (England) Harlequins
- (England) Tom Manz from (England) Leicester Tigers (season-long loan)
- (Wales) Ioan Emanuel from (England) Bath (season-long loan)

=== Players out ===
- (England) Ben Donnell to (Ireland) Ulster
- (Wales) Corey Domachowski to (Wales) Scarlets
- (Wales) Leigh Halfpenny (retired)
- (Wales) Dylan Barratt (released)
- (Ireland) Ed Byrne (released)
- (Wales) Ollie Das (released)
- (Wales) Joseff Jones (released)
- (Wales) Harrison Rock (released)
- (Wales) Mackenzie Martin to (France) Beziers
- (Wales) Will Davies-King to (England) Bedford Blues
- (England) Rory Jennings to (England) Rosslyn Park

== United Rugby Championship ==
=== Matches ===
Cardiff Rugby will begin its sixth URC campaign with a Welsh derby away to Scarlets, ending the regular season domestic campaign nine months later with the reverse fixture.

26 September	(1 BP) Scarlets (Wales)	15–21	(Wales) Cardiff	Parc y Scarlets, Llanelli
	Try: Roberts 6' m Murray 23' c Con: Anscombe (1/2) 24'; Pen: Hawkins 52'	Report; Scorecard; Highlights	Try: Thomas 18' c Basham 38' c E Lloyd 65' c Con: Sheedy (2/2) 19', 39'; J Evans (1/1) 65'	Attendance: 7,073; Referee: A Jones

2 October	(1 BP) Cardiff (Wales)	40–27	(Italy) Zebre (1 BP)	Cardiff Arms Park
	Try: T Williams 9' m Sebastien 18' c Basham 27' c Mann 36' c Bowen (2) 43' c, 54' c Con: Sheedy (4/5) 19', 27', 37', 44'; J Evans (1/1) 54'	Report; Scorecard; Highlights	Try: Minervino 21' m Ferrari 59' c Bertaccini 64' m Da Re 69' c Con: Da Re (2/4) 59', 70'; Pen: Allan 6'	Attendance: 7,231; Referee: Morné Ferreira (South Africa)

10 October	(1 BP) Leinster (Ireland)	29–5	(Wales) Cardiff	RDS Arena, Dublin
	Try: Keenan 9' m J O'Brien (2) 17' m, 37' c Conan 19' m J Osborne 77' c Con: Prendergast (2/5) 39', 78'	Report; Scorecard; Highlights	Try: Grady 24' m Cards: Davies (yellow card) 15'	Attendance: 20,035; Referee: Sam Grove-White (Scotland)

23 October	Cardiff (Wales)	21–36	(South Africa) Sharks (1 BP)	Cardiff Arms Park
	Try: Adams 10' c Botham (2) 45' c, 58' c Con: Evans (3/3) 11', 46', 59'	Report; Scorecard; Highlights	Try: Hooker 2' m Romao (2) 25' c, 80' m Jenkins 43' m du Toit 62' c Bester 74' c Con: Lombard (2/4) 27', 63'; Masuka (1/2) 75'	Attendance: 8,076; Referee: Andrea Piardi (Italy)

31 October 2026	Ospreys (Wales)	v	(Wales) Cardiff	St Helen's, Swansea

5 December 2026	Cardiff (Wales)	v	(Ireland) Ulster	Cardiff Arms Park

19 December 2026	Cardiff (Wales)	v	(Wales) Dragons	Cardiff Arms Park

26 December 2026	Dragons (Wales)	v	(Wales) Cardiff	Rodney Parade, Newport

2 January 2027	Cardiff (Wales)	v	(Wales) Ospreys	Cardiff Arms Park

23 January 2027	Stormers (South Africa)	v	(Wales) Cardiff	Cape Town Stadium

30 January 2027	Lions (South Africa)	v	(Wales) Cardiff	Ellis Park Stadium, Jo'burg

27 February 2027	Cardiff (Wales)	v	(Scotland) Glasgow Warriors	Cardiff Arms Park

19 March 2027	Connacht (Ireland)	v	(Wales) Cardiff	The Sportsground, Galway

27 March 2027	Cardiff (Wales)	v	(Ireland) Munster	Cardiff Arms Park

16 April 2027	Edinburgh (Scotland)	v	(Wales) Cardiff	Edinburgh Rugby Stadium

23 April 2027	Cardiff (Wales)	v	(South Africa) Bulls	Cardiff Arms Park

8 May 2027	Benetton (Italy)	v	(Wales) Cardiff	Stadio Monigo, Treviso

15 May 2027	Cardiff (Wales)	v	(Wales) Scarlets	Cardiff Arms Park

=== Standings ===
Pos	Team	Pld	W	D	L	PF	PA	PD	TF	TA	TB	LB	Pts	Qualification
1	Edinburgh	4	4	0	0	111	64	+47	15	8	3	0	19	Qualification for the Champions Cup and knockout stage
2	Glasgow Warriors	4	3	1	0	119	92	+27	18	12	4	0	18	Qualification for the Champions Cup and knockout stage
3	Bulls	4	3	0	1	160	90	+70	23	11	3	1	16	Qualification for the Champions Cup and knockout stage
4	Stormers	4	3	0	1	133	94	+39	19	13	3	1	16	Qualification for the Champions Cup and knockout stage
5	Sharks	4	3	0	1	125	104	+21	18	16	3	0	15	Qualification for the Champions Cup and knockout stage
6	Leinster	4	2	0	2	99	76	+23	16	10	3	2	13	Qualification for the Champions Cup and knockout stage
7	Ospreys	4	2	0	2	112	121	−9	18	17	3	0	11	Qualification for the Champions Cup and knockout stage
8	Connacht	4	2	0	2	104	111	−7	17	17	2	0	10	Qualification for the Champions Cup and knockout stage
9	Munster	4	1	1	2	90	98	−8	12	15	2	2	10	Qualification for the Challenge Cup
10	Cardiff	4	2	0	2	87	107	−20	13	17	1	0	9	Qualification for the Challenge Cup
11	Lions	4	2	0	2	87	133	−46	12	21	1	0	9	Qualification for the Challenge Cup
12	Ulster	4	0	2	2	114	127	−13	17	17	4	1	9	Qualification for the Challenge Cup
13	Dragons	4	1	1	2	102	114	−12	15	18	2	1	9	Qualification for the Challenge Cup
14	Scarlets	4	1	0	3	108	137	−29	16	21	3	1	8	Qualification for the Challenge Cup
15	Benetton	4	0	1	3	84	92	−8	12	15	1	3	6	Qualification for the Challenge Cup
16	Zebre	4	0	0	4	79	164	−85	12	25	2	0	2	Qualification for the Challenge Cup

Updated to match(es) played on 23 October 2026. Source: UnitedRugby.com
Rules for classification: Tiebreakers for teams tied on points: 1) Number of matches won 2) The difference between points for and points against 3) The number of tries scored 4) The most points scored 5) The difference between tries for and tries against 6) The fewest red cards received 7) The fewest yellow cards received.

=== URC Welsh Shield ===
2026–27 United Rugby Championship Regional Shield tables
(Wales) Welsh Shield
	Team	P	W	D	L	PF	PA	PD	TF	TA	TBP	LBP	Pts	Pos overall
1	(Wales) Dragons	2	1	0	1	69	64	+5	10	10	2	1	7	6
2	(Wales) Ospreys	1	1	0	0	38	31	+7	6	4	1	0	5	10
3	(Wales) Cardiff	1	1	0	0	21	15	+6	3	2	0	0	4	3
4	(Wales) Scarlets	2	0	0	2	41	59	–18	6	9	1	1	2	15
If teams are level at any stage, tiebreakers are applied in the following order: 1. number of matches won 2. the difference between points for and points against 3. the number of tries scored 4. the most points scored 5. the difference between tries for and tries against 6. the fewest red cards received 7. the fewest yellow cards received
Green background indicates teams currently leading the regional shield. Upon the conclusion of the regular season, these teams win their respective regional shields. (S) : URC Shield champion

== European Rugby Champions Cup ==
Having finished sixth in the 2025–26 United Rugby Championship, Cardiff qualified for the 2026–27 European Rugby Champions Cup. The pool stage draw will take place on 1 July 2026.
