= 2026–27 Munster Rugby season =

Munster Rugby
- 2026–27 season
- Head coach: Clayton McMillan
- CEO: Ian Flanaghan

The 2026–27 season is Munster Rugby's sixth season in the United Rugby Championship, and 26th in all formats of the competition. Along with competing in the URC and its Irish Shield competition, the club will also participate in the 2026–27 European Rugby Champions Cup, their 32nd season of both European competition and professional rugby overall.

== Squad and management ==
Clayton McMillan returns as head coach of the team. Following the collapse of the attempt to appoint Roger Randle as a senior coach due to historic allegations against him, the province launched a review into the process. In the meantime, Jared Payne comes in as attack coach on a two year contract, and Mossy Lawler's contract is extended. Mike Prendergast leaves the club. Jimmy Duffy replaces Alex Codling as forwards coach to complete the new line up.

Name	Role	Status
Clayton McMillan	Head coach	Continuing
Jared Payne	Attack coach	New hire
Jimmy Duffy	Forwards coach	New hire
Mossy Lawlor	Attack and skills coach	Contract extended

=== Players in ===
- (South Africa) Marnus van der Merwe from (Wales) Scarlets
- (Ireland) Sean Edogbo (promoted from Academy)
- (Ireland) Ben O'Connor (promoted from Academy)
- (Ireland) Ronan Foxe (promoted from Academy)
- (Ireland) Jack Aungier from (Ireland) Connacht
- (Ireland) Max Clein (promoted from Academy)
- (Australia) Will Harrison from (Japan) Hanazono Kintetsu Liners
- (Ireland) Ben O'Donovan (promoted from Academy)
- (England) Kieran Brookes from (France) Perpignan
- (Ireland) Rob Russell from (Ireland) Old Belvedere R.F.C. (short term injury cover)

=== Players out ===
- (South Africa) Jean Kleyn to (England) Gloucester
- (Ireland) Niall Scannell (retired)
- (Ireland) John Ryan (retired)
- (South Africa) Thaakir Abrahams to (South Africa) Bulls
- (Ireland) Tony Butler (released)
- (Ireland) Paddy Patterson (released)
- (Ireland) Andrew Smith to (Australia) Eastern Suburbs
- (Ireland) Oli Jager (retired)
- (Ireland) Fionn Gibbons to (England) Ealing Trailfinders
- (Ireland) Conor Bartley (released)
- (Ireland) Roman Salanoa to (Ireland) Nenagh Ormond

== United Rugby Championship ==
=== Matches ===
Munster will begin their sixth URC campaign by hosting Scottish rival Glasgow Warriors. The domestic campaign is heavily front-loaded with home fixtures and URC Irish Shield match-ups, with nine of Munster's first ten matches on the island of Ireland, including five of their six URC Irish Shield ties.

26 September	(1 BP) Munster (Ireland)	20–26	(Scotland) Glasgow Warriors (1 BP)	Thomond Park, Limerick
	Try: O'Connor 14' c Milne 36' c Con: Hanrahan (2/2) 15', 37'; Pen: Hanrahan (2) 4', 58'	Report; Scorecard; Highlights	Try: Dobie (2) 31' c, 76' m McBeth 51' c Horne 67' x Con: Horne (3/4) 32', 52', 68'; Cards: Smith (yellow card) 8'	Attendance: 11,031; Referee: Ferreira (South Africa)

3 October	(1 BP) Munster (Ireland)	26–22	(South Africa) Bulls (1 BP)	Thomond Park, Limerick
	Try: Kilgallen 20' c O'Shea (2) 32' c, 55' m Kendellen 69' c Con: O'Shea (3/4) 21', 32', 70'	Report; Scorecard; Highlights	Try: Vermaak 15' c Klopper 36' c Rudolph 73' m Con: Bosch (2/3) 16', 37'; Pen: Bosch 44'	Attendance: 10,318; Referee: Federico Vedovelli (Italy)

10 October	(1 BP) Ulster (Ireland)	26–26	(Ireland) Munster (1 BP)	Ravenhill Stadium, Belfast
	Try: Stockdale (2) 12' m, 53' c McCann 68' c McCloskey 77' c Con: Murphy (3/4) 54', 69', 78'; Cards: Izuchukwu (yellow card) 29'	Report, 2 Scorecard; Highlights	Try: Kendellen (2) 9' m, 40' c Merwe 15' c Kelly 32' c Con: Hanrahan (3/4) 16', 32', 41'	Attendance: 12,814; Referee: Craig Evans (Wales)

24 October	(1 BP) Leinster (Ireland)	24–18	(Ireland) Munster (1 BP)	Aviva Stadium, Dublin
	Try: T O'Brien 34' m Baird 55' c Tector 64' m J Osborne 73' c Con: Carbery (2/4) 56', 74'	Report; Scorecard; Highlights	Try: Daly 27' c O'Connor 82' m Con: O'Shea (1/2) 28'; Pen: O'Shea (2) 7', 30'; Cards: Nankivell (yellow card) 55'	Attendance: 37,193; Referee: Andrew Brace (Ireland)

31 October 2026	Munster (Ireland)	v	(South Africa) Sharks	Thomond Park, Limerick

5 December 2026	Zebre Parma (Italy)	v	(Ireland) Munster	Stadio Sergio Lanfranchi

18 December 2026	Munster (Ireland)	v	(Wales) Scarlets	Musgrave Park, Cork

27 December 2026	Munster (Ireland)	v	(Ireland) Leinster	Thomond Park, Limerick

2 January 2027	Connacht (Ireland)	v	(Ireland) Munster	The Sportsground, Galway

23 January 2027	Munster (Ireland)	v	(Ireland) Connacht	Thomond Park, Limerick

29 January 2027	Dragons (Wales)	v	(Ireland) Munster	Rodney Parade, Newport

26 February 2027	Munster (Ireland)	v	(Italy) Benetton	Musgrave Park, Cork

20 March 2027	Munster (Ireland)	v	(Wales) Ospreys	Thomond Park, Limerick

27 March 2027	Cardiff (Wales)	v	(Ireland) Munster	Cardiff Arms Park

17 April 2027	Lions (South Africa)	v	(Ireland) Munster	Ellis Park Stadium, Johannesburg

24 April 2027	Stormers (South Africa)	v	(Ireland) Munster	Cape Town Stadium

8 May 2027	Munster (Ireland)	v	(Ireland) Ulster	Thomond Park, Limerick

14 May 2027	Edinburgh (Scotland)	v	(Ireland) Munster	Edinburgh Rugby Stadium

=== Standings ===
Pos	Team	Pld	W	D	L	PF	PA	PD	TF	TA	TB	LB	Pts	Qualification
1	Glasgow Warriors	5	4	1	0	148	112	+36	22	15	5	0	23	Qualification for the Champions Cup and knockout stage
2	Edinburgh	4	4	0	0	111	64	+47	15	8	3	0	19	Qualification for the Champions Cup and knockout stage
3	Leinster	5	3	0	2	149	81	+68	23	11	4	2	18	Qualification for the Champions Cup and knockout stage
4	Bulls	4	3	0	1	160	90	+70	23	11	3	1	16	Qualification for the Champions Cup and knockout stage
5	Stormers	4	3	0	1	133	94	+39	19	13	3	1	16	Qualification for the Champions Cup and knockout stage
6	Sharks	4	3	0	1	125	104	+21	18	16	3	0	15	Qualification for the Champions Cup and knockout stage
7	Ospreys	4	2	0	2	112	121	−9	18	17	3	0	11	Qualification for the Champions Cup and knockout stage
8	Connacht	5	2	0	3	109	161	−52	18	24	2	0	10	Qualification for the Champions Cup and knockout stage
9	Munster	4	1	1	2	90	98	−8	12	15	2	2	10	Qualification for the Challenge Cup
10	Cardiff	4	2	0	2	87	107	−20	13	17	1	0	9	Qualification for the Challenge Cup
11	Lions	5	2	0	3	107	162	−55	15	25	1	0	9	Qualification for the Challenge Cup
12	Ulster	4	0	2	2	114	127	−13	17	17	4	1	9	Qualification for the Challenge Cup
13	Dragons	4	1	1	2	102	114	−12	15	18	2	1	9	Qualification for the Challenge Cup
14	Scarlets	4	1	0	3	108	137	−29	16	21	3	1	8	Qualification for the Challenge Cup
15	Benetton	4	0	1	3	84	92	−8	12	15	1	3	6	Qualification for the Challenge Cup
16	Zebre	4	0	0	4	79	164	−85	12	25	2	0	2	Qualification for the Challenge Cup

Updated to match(es) played on 23 October 2026. Source: UnitedRugby.com
Rules for classification: Tiebreakers for teams tied on points: 1) Number of matches won 2) The difference between points for and points against 3) The number of tries scored 4) The most points scored 5) The difference between tries for and tries against 6) The fewest red cards received 7) The fewest yellow cards received.

=== URC Irish Shield ===
2026–27 United Rugby Championship Regional Shield tables
(Ireland) Irish Shield
	Team	P	W	D	L	PF	PA	PD	TF	TA	TBP	LBP	Pts	Pos overall
1	(Ireland) Leinster	2	2	0	0	74	23	+51	11	3	2	0	10	3
2	(Ireland) Munster	2	0	1	1	44	50	–6	6	8	1	1	4	9
3	(Ireland) Ulster	1	0	1	0	26	26	0	4	4	1	0	3	12
4	(Ireland) Connacht	1	0	0	1	5	50	-45	1	7	0	0	0	8
If teams are level at any stage, tiebreakers are applied in the following order: 1. number of matches won 2. the difference between points for and points against 3. the number of tries scored 4. the most points scored 5. the difference between tries for and tries against 6. the fewest red cards received 7. the fewest yellow cards received
Green background indicates teams currently leading the regional shield. Upon the conclusion of the regular season, these teams win their respective regional shields. (S) : URC Shield champion

== European Rugby Champions Cup ==
European Rugby Champions Cup Pool 3
Pos	Team	Pld	W	D	L	PF	PA	PD	TF	TA	TB	LB	Pts	Qualification
1	(South Africa) Stormers	1	1	0	0	49	12	+37	7	2	1	0	5	Champions Cup round of 16.
2	(Ireland) Munster	1	1	0	0	33	25	+8	5	3	0	0	4	Champions Cup round of 16.
3	(England) Gloucester	1	0	1	0	36	36	0	5	5	0	0	2	Champions Cup round of 16.
4	(France) Bordeaux Bègles	1	0	1	0	36	36	0	5	5	0	0	2	Champions Cup or Challenge Cup round of 16 based on table points amongst non-top-three teams.
5	(France) Racing 92	1	0	0	1	25	33	−8	3	5	0	0	0	Champions Cup or Challenge Cup round of 16 based on table points amongst non-top-three teams.
6	(England) Bristol Bears	1	0	0	1	12	49	−37	2	7	0	0	0	Champions Cup or Challenge Cup round of 16 based on table points amongst non-top-three teams.

Updated to match(es) played on 17 October 2026. Source: EPCR
Rules for classification: Tiebreakers for teams tied on points: 1) Number of matches won; 2) Difference between points for and against; 3) Total number of points for; 4) Aggregate number of points scored in matches between tied teams; 5) Number of matches won excluding the first match, then the second and so on until the tie is settled.

=== Pool matches ===
17 October 2026	Munster (Ireland)	33–25	(France) Racing 92	SuperValu Páirc Uí Chaoimh, Cork
20:00	Try: Gleeson 7' c McCarthy 13' c Beirne 43' c Wycherley 60' c Casey 79' m Con: O'Shea (3/3) 8', 14', 44'; Hanrahan (1/2) 61'	Report	Try: Hulleu 48' m Machenaud 53' c Manu 67' c Con: Gibert (2/3) 54', 68'; Pen: Gibert (2/2) 3', 26'; Cards: Roche (yellow card) 70'	Attendance: 24,906; Referee: Karl Dickson (England)

12 December 2026	Bristol Bears (England)	v	(Ireland) Munster	Ashton Gate, Bristol
20:00

10 January 2027	Bordeaux Bègles (France)	v	(Ireland) Munster	Stade Chaban-Delmas, Bordeaux
16:15

16 January 2027	Munster (Ireland)	v	(England) Gloucester	Thomond Park, Limerick
17:30
