= Seilala Lam =

Samoan rugby union player

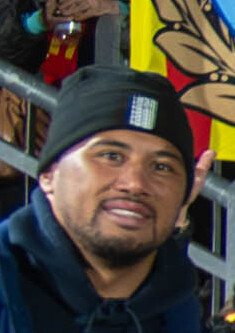
- Full name: Leon Seilala Lam
- Born: 18 February 1989 (age 37) Hamilton, New Zealand
- Height: 1.83 m (6 ft 0 in)
- Weight: 110 kg (243 lb; 17 st 5 lb)
- School: St. Edmund's College
- Notable relative(s): Jack Lam (brother); Ben Lam (cousin); Pat Lam (cousin); Seilala Mapusua (uncle)

Rugby union career
- Position: Hooker
- Current team: Perpignan
Senior career
| Years | Team | Apps | (Points) |
| 2010 | Randwick | 18 | (20) |
| 2014 | Eastern Suburbs | 9 | (10) |
| 2014 | Canberra Vikings | 6 | (0) |
| 2015–2017 | Nevers | 23 | (25) |
| 2017–2025 | Perpignan | 160 | (85) |
- Correct as of 28 August 2023
International career
| Years | Team | Apps | (Points) |
| 2008–2009 | Australia U20 | 7 | (5) |
| 2016– | Samoa | 24 | (15) |
- Correct as of 28 August 2023

Leon Seilala Lam (born 18 February 1989) is a professional rugby union player who plays as a hooker for Top 14 club Perpignan. Born in New Zealand, he represents Samoa at international level after qualifying on ancestry grounds.

== Early life ==
Seilala was born in New Zealand, but was raised in Australia.

== Club career ==
He began his professional career in 2010, where he played with Randwick in The Shute Shield. He played the following season with Eastern Suburbs RUFC in The Shute Shield, During his time there he trained with the Waratahs where Head Coach at the time Michael Cheika suggested for him to change from an openside flanker into hooker before the 2014 National Rugby Championship season for the Canberra Vikings.

In 2015 Lam joined USO Nevers in France, playing 23 games for the club over 18 months before joining USA Perpignan in 2017.

== International career ==
Seilala Lam was first selected for Samoa in 2016, Later being named in Samoa's final 31 Man squad for the 2019 Rugby World Cup.
