= 2026–27 Bulls (rugby union) season =

Bulls
- 2026–27 season
- Head coach: Johan Ackermann

The 2026–27 season is the Bulls' sixth season in the United Rugby Championship. Along with competing in the URC and its South African Shield competition, the club will also participated in the 2026–27 European Rugby Champions Cup.

== Squad and management ==
Johan Ackermann returns for his second year as head coach at the Bulls.

=== Players in ===
- (South Africa) Thaakir Abrahams from (Ireland) Munster
- (South Africa) Curwin Bosch from (France) Brive
- (South Africa) Jean Erasmus (promoted from Academy)
- (South Africa) Hakeem Kunene from (South Africa) Sharks
- (South Africa) Hanro Liebenberg from (England) Leicester Tigers
- (South Africa) Dylan Maart from (South Africa) Stormers
- (South Africa) Mawande Mdanda from (South Africa) Sharks
- (South Africa) Heinrich Theron (promoted from Academy)
- (South Africa) JJ Theron (promoted from Academy)
- (South Africa) Sango Xamlashe from (South Africa) Pumas
- (South Africa) Janco Uys from (South Africa) Griquas (season-long loan)
- (South Africa) Kwagga Smith from (Japan) Shizuoka Blue Revs

=== Players out ===
- (South Africa) Kurt-Lee Arendse to (Japan) Mitsubishi Sagamihara DynaBoars
- (South Africa) Wilco Louw to (South Africa) Stormers
- (South Africa) Esethu Mnebelele to (South Africa) Sharks
- (South Africa) David Kriel to (France) La Rochelle
- (South Africa) Jan Serfontein (retired)
- (South Africa) Jannes Kirsten to (France) Mont-de-Marsan
- (South Africa) Henry Immelman to (South Africa) Cheetahs
- (South Africa) Ruan Nortjé to (Japan) Kubota Spears
- (South Africa) Steven Nel (released)
- (South Africa) Ruan Swart to (South Africa) Lions (Currie Cup)
- (South Africa) Kade Wolhuter (released)

== United Rugby Championship ==
=== Matches ===
Bulls will begin its sixth URC Campaign on 26 September 2026 away to Italian side Zebre Parma.

26 September	Zebre (Italy)	13–47	(South Africa) Bulls (1 BP)	Stadio Sergio Lanfranchi
	Try: Fusco 58' c Con: Allan (1/1) 59'; Pen: Allan (2) 14', 30'; Cards: Canali (yellow card) 26'; Pelliccioli (yellow card) 81'	Report; Scorecard; Highlights	Try: Ludwig (2) 31' c, 78' de Wet 38' c Ruan Vermaak 43' c Harold Vorster 51' c Zak Burger 83' m Con: Bosch (4/4) 32', 39', 43', 52' le Roux (1/2) 79' c Cards: Rudolph (yellow card) 77'	Attendance: 2,498; Referee: Andrew Brace

3 October	(1 BP) Munster (Ireland)	26–22	(South Africa) Bulls (1 BP)	Thomond Park, Limerick
	Try: Kilgallen 20' c O'Shea (2) 32' c, 55' m Kendellen 69' c Con: O'Shea (3/4) 21', 32', 70'	Report; Scorecard; Highlights	Try: Vermaak 15' c Klopper 36' c Rudolph 73' m Con: Bosch (2/3) 16', 37'; Pen: Bosch 44'	Attendance: 10,318; Referee: Federico Vedovelli (Italy)

10 October	(1 BP) Bulls (South Africa)	57–15	(South Africa) Lions	Loftus Versfeld, Pretoria
	Try: Vorster 10' m Grobbelaar 26' c Hanekom (2) 30' c, 35' m Rudolph 40' c Moodie 44' m van Heerden 68' c Jooste 74' c de Klerk 80' c Con: Bosch (3/6) 26', 30', 41'; Pollard (3/3) 69', 75', 81'	Report; Scorecard; Highlights	Try: Qoma 18' c Brandon 50' m Con: C Smith 19' c Pen: C Smith 33'; Cards: Morne van den Berg (yellow card) 26'	Attendance: 11,307; Referee: Hanru van Rooyen (South Africa)

24 October	(1 BP) Bulls (South Africa)	34–26	(Ireland) Ulster (1 BP)	Loftus Versfeld, Pretoria
	Try: Coetzee (2) 2' c, 32' c Louw 18' c Grobbelaar 66' c Con: Pollard (4/4) 3', 19', 33', 67'; Pen: Pollard, 50'; Bosch, 80+2'; Cards: Coetzee (yellow card) 44'	Report; Scorecard; Highlights	Try: Mullins 40+1' c McCann 45' c McCloskey, 70' c Con: Murphy (3/4) 40+2', 45', 71'	Attendance: 6,422; Referee: Ru Campbell (Scotland)

31 October 2026	Bulls (South Africa)	v	(Wales) Scarlets	Loftus Versfeld Stadium, Pretoria

5 December 2026	Lions (South Africa)	v	(South Africa) Bulls	Ellis Park Stadium, Jo'burg

19 December 2026	Sharks (South Africa)	v	(South Africa) Bulls	Kings Park Stadium, Durban

3 January 2027	Stormers (South Africa)	v	(South Africa) Bulls	Cape Town Stadium

23 January 2027	Benetton (Italy)	v	(South Africa) Bulls	Stadio Monigo, Treviso

30 January 2027	Leinster (Ireland)	v	(South Africa) Bulls	RDS Arena, Dublin

21 February 2027	Bulls (South Africa)	v	(South Africa) Stormers	Loftus Versfeld Stadium, Pretoria

27 February 2027	Bulls (South Africa)	v	(South Africa) Sharks	Loftus Versfeld Stadium, Pretoria

20 March 2027	Bulls (South Africa)	v	(Wales) Dragons	Loftus Versfeld Stadium, Pretoria

27 March 2027	Bulls (South Africa)	v	(Scotland) Edinburgh	Loftus Versfeld Stadium, Pretoria

17 April 2027	Ospreys (Wales)	v	(South Africa) Bulls	St Helen's, Swansea

23 April 2027	Cardiff (Wales)	v	(South Africa) Bulls	Cardiff Arms Park

8 May 2027	Bulls (South Africa)	v	(Scotland) Glasgow Warriors	Loftus Versfeld Stadium, Pretoria

15 May 2027	Bulls (South Africa)	v	(Ireland) Connacht	Loftus Versfeld Stadium, Pretoria

=== Standings ===
Pos	Team	Pld	W	D	L	PF	PA	PD	TF	TA	TB	LB	Pts	Qualification
1	Glasgow Warriors	5	4	1	0	148	112	+36	22	15	5	0	23	Qualification for the Champions Cup and knockout stage
2	Bulls	5	4	0	1	214	106	+108	31	15	4	1	21	Qualification for the Champions Cup and knockout stage
3	Stormers	5	4	0	1	166	101	+65	24	14	4	1	21	Qualification for the Champions Cup and knockout stage
4	Sharks	5	4	0	1	140	107	+33	20	16	3	0	19	Qualification for the Champions Cup and knockout stage
5	Edinburgh	5	4	0	1	123	95	+28	17	12	3	0	19	Qualification for the Champions Cup and knockout stage
6	Leinster	5	3	0	2	149	81	+68	23	11	4	2	18	Qualification for the Champions Cup and knockout stage
7	Cardiff	5	3	0	2	113	107	+6	17	17	2	0	14	Qualification for the Champions Cup and knockout stage
8	Dragons	5	2	1	2	137	128	+9	20	20	3	1	14	Qualification for the Champions Cup and knockout stage
9	Ospreys	5	2	0	3	112	147	−35	18	21	3	0	11	Qualification for the Challenge Cup
10	Benetton	5	1	1	3	115	104	+11	16	17	2	3	11	Qualification for the Challenge Cup
11	Connacht	5	2	0	3	109	161	−52	18	24	2	0	10	Qualification for the Challenge Cup
12	Munster	5	1	1	3	93	113	−20	12	17	2	2	10	Qualification for the Challenge Cup
13	Lions	5	2	0	3	107	162	−55	15	25	1	0	9	Qualification for the Challenge Cup
14	Scarlets	5	1	0	4	134	191	−57	20	29	4	1	9	Qualification for the Challenge Cup
15	Ulster	5	0	2	3	121	160	−39	18	22	4	1	9	Qualification for the Challenge Cup
16	Zebre	5	0	0	5	93	199	−106	14	30	2	0	2	Qualification for the Challenge Cup

Updated to match(es) played on 2nd November 2026. Source: UnitedRugby.com
Rules for classification: Tiebreakers for teams tied on points: 1) Number of matches won 2) The difference between points for and points against 3) The number of tries scored 4) The most points scored 5) The difference between tries for and tries against 6) The fewest red cards received 7) The fewest yellow cards received.

=== URC South African Shield ===
2026–27 United Rugby Championship Regional Shield tables
(South Africa) South African Shield
	Team	P	W	D	L	PF	PA	PD	TF	TA	TBP	LBP	Pts	Pos overall
1	(South Africa) Bulls	1	1	0	0	57	15	+42	9	2	1	0	5	2
2	(South Africa) Stormers	1	1	0	0	39	22	+17	6	3	1	0	5	3
3	(South Africa) Sharks	1	0	0	1	22	39	–17	3	6	0	0	0	4
4	(South Africa) Lions	1	0	0	1	15	57	–42	2	9	0	0	0	13
If teams are level at any stage, tiebreakers are applied in the following order: 1. number of matches won 2. the difference between points for and points against 3. the number of tries scored 4. the most points scored 5. the difference between tries for and tries against 6. the fewest red cards received 7. the fewest yellow cards received
Green background indicates teams currently leading the regional shield. Upon the conclusion of the regular season, these teams win their respective regional shields. (S) : URC Shield champion

== European Rugby Champions Cup ==
Having finished fourth in the 2025–26 United Rugby Championship, Bulls qualified for the 2026–27 European Rugby Champions Cup. The pool stage draw will take place on 1 July 2026.

=== Pool table ===
European Rugby Champions Cup Pool 4
Pos	Team	Pld	W	D	L	PF	PA	PD	TF	TA	TB	LB	Pts	Qualification
1	(South Africa) Bulls	1	1	0	0	56	20	+36	8	2	1	0	5	Champions Cup round of 16.
2	(France) Montpellier	1	1	0	0	32	14	+18	4	2	0	0	4	Champions Cup round of 16.
3	(England) Northampton Saints	1	1	0	0	28	12	+16	4	2	0	0	4	Champions Cup round of 16.
4	(Wales) Cardiff	1	0	0	1	12	28	−16	2	4	0	0	0	Champions Cup or Challenge Cup round of 16 based on table points amongst non-top-three teams.
5	(England) Bath	1	0	0	1	14	32	−18	2	4	0	0	0	Champions Cup or Challenge Cup round of 16 based on table points amongst non-top-three teams.
6	(France) Stade Français Paris	1	0	0	1	20	56	−36	2	8	0	0	0	Champions Cup or Challenge Cup round of 16 based on table points amongst non-top-three teams.

Updated to match(es) played on 18 October 2026. Source: EPCR
Rules for classification: Tiebreakers for teams tied on points: 1) Number of matches won; 2) Difference between points for and against; 3) Total number of points for; 4) Aggregate number of points scored in matches between tied teams; 5) Number of matches won excluding the first match, then the second and so on until the tie is settled.

=== Pool matches ===
17 October 2026	(1 BP) Bulls (South Africa)	56–20	(France) Stade Français Paris	Loftus Versfeld, Pretoria
14:00	Try: Jooste (3) 1' c, 74' c, 76' c Wiese 17' c Hanekom 37' c van Staden 47' c Rudolph 63' c Wessels 68' c Con: Pollard (8/8) 2', 17', 37', 48', 63', 69', 75', 77'	Report; Scorecard; Highlights	Try: Botha 44' c Mailulu 56' c Con: Foursans-Bourdette (2/2) 45', 57'; Pen: West 10'; Foursans-Bourdette 33'	Attendance: 8,942; Referee: Christophe Ridley (England)

12 December 2026	Montpellier (France)	v	(South Africa) Bulls	Septeo Stadium, Montpellier
16:15

9 January 2027	Bulls (South Africa)	v	(England) Bath	Loftus Versfeld, Pretoria
17:00

15 January 2027	Northampton Saints (England)	v	(South Africa) Bulls	Franklin's Gardens, Northampton
20:00
