= Semisi Paea =

Tongan rugby union player

- Born: 17 April 1999 (age 27) Tofoa, Tonga
- Height: 1.94 m (6 ft 4 in)
- Weight: 114 kg (251 lb; 17 st 13 lb)
- School: Rotorua Boys' High School

Rugby union career
- Position(s): Lock, Flanker
- Current team: Cardiff Rugby
Senior career
Years	Team	Apps	(Points)
2020–2025	Bay of Plenty	28	(20)
2022–2023	New England Free Jacks	13	(5)
2026-	Cardiff Rugby	0	(0)
- Correct as of 15 July 2026
International career
Years	Team	Apps	(Points)
2021–	Tonga	13	(0)
- Correct as of 11 July 2026

Semisi Paea (born 17 April 1999) is a Tongan professional rugby union player who plays as a lock for Cardiff Rugby and the Tonga national team.

== Early life ==
Paea was born in Tonga but grew up and lives in Rotorua in New Zealand, where he represents Ngongotaha Rugby Club.

== Club career ==
Paea was named in the Bay of Plenty squad for the 2021 Bunnings NPC. At the end of the 2021 season, he was selected for the New Zealand Barbarians. In 2023, he joined the New England Free Jacks for the 2023 Major League Rugby season.

Paea made his debut for Tonga in 2021 against the Cook Islands. He made further appearances for Tonga in the 2022 World Rugby Pacific Nations Cup.
