= Filo Tiatia =

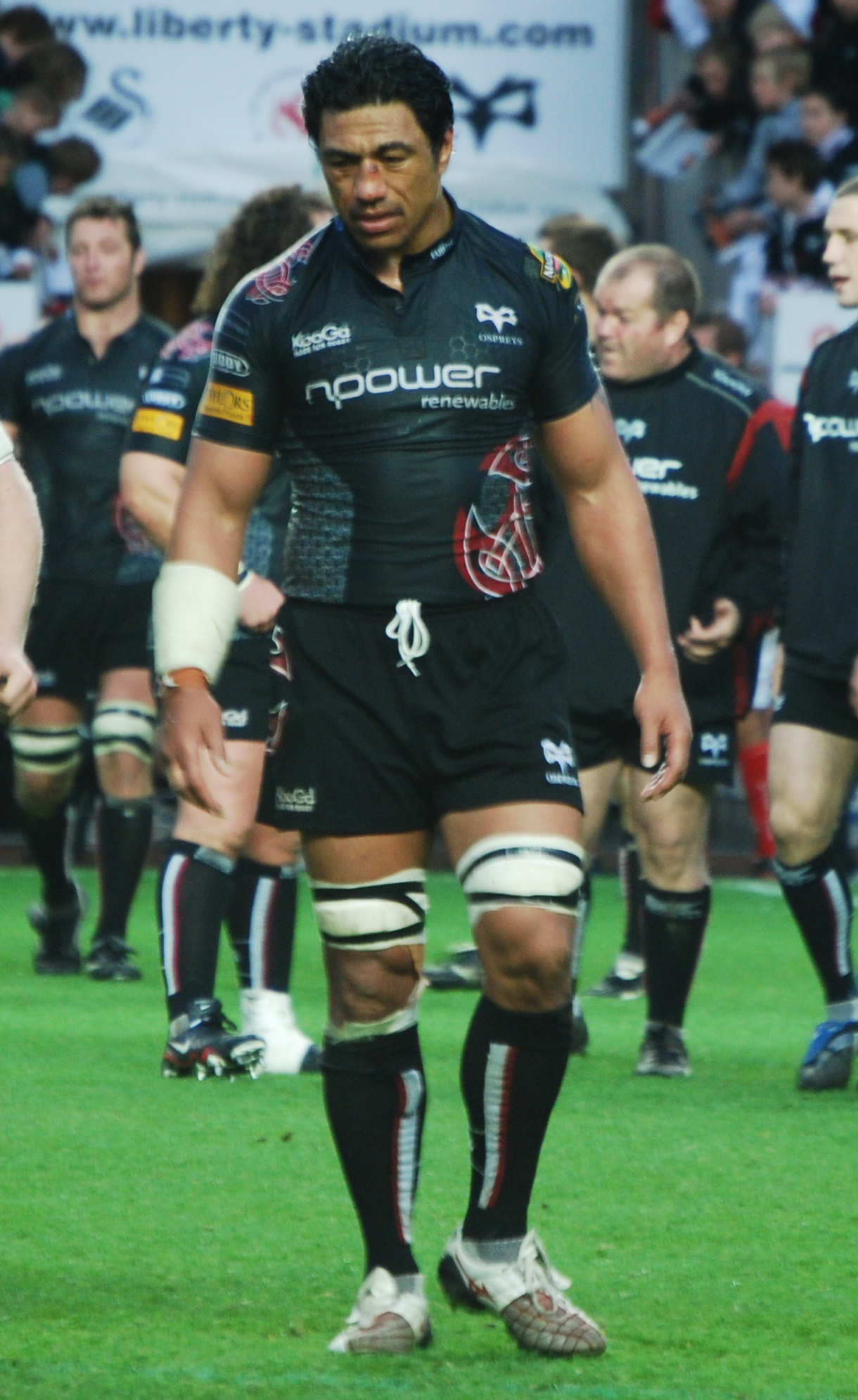
- Filo Tiatia playing for Ospreys in 2008
- Born: Filogia Ian Tiatia; 4 June 1971 (age 55) Wellington, New Zealand
- Height: 192 cm (6 ft 4 in)
- Weight: 112 kg (17 st 9 lb)
- School: Wellington College
- University: Massey University; UWIC

Rugby union career
- Position(s): Number eight, flanker, Lock
- Current team: Dragons RFC
Amateur team(s)
Years	Team	Apps	(Points)
	Western Suburbs Roosters	100	
Senior career
Years	Team	Apps	(Points)
1992–2001	Wellington	80	
1993–1994	Tarvisium		
2002–2006	Toyota Verblitz		
2006–2011	Ospreys	99	(50)
Super Rugby
Years	Team	Apps	(Points)
1996–2001	Hurricanes	57	(40)
International career
Years	Team	Apps	(Points)
2000	New Zealand	2	(10)
Coaching career
- Years: Team
- 2007–2011: Ospreys Assistant
- 2011–2012: Toyota Verblitz Assistant
- 2012–2015: Toyota Verblitz
- 2016: Sunwolves Assistant
- 2016-2017: Japan Assistant
- 2016-2017: Sunwolves
- 2018-2021: Auckland Assistant
- 2024-: Dragons RFC
- Correct as of 17 February 2024

Filogia Ian "Filo" Tiatia (born 4 June 1971) is a New Zealand former international rugby union player and current coach. He is best known for his time as back-row forward and occasional lock for the Ospreys. He is currently head coach of Welsh side Dragons RFC in the United Rugby Championship.

Tiatia made his debut for Wellington in 1992, playing through the advent of professionalism and then represented the Hurricanes in the Super 12 between 1996 and 2002.

Tiatia won 2 caps for the New Zealand national side in 2000. His first was as a replacement in a 102–0 win against Tonga where he scored a try. The next was a start at flanker against Italy where he again scored another try. match list

He then moved to Japan to play four seasons for Toyota Verblitz before signing for the Welsh region the Ospreys.

He became a cult figure at the Ospreys impressing fans with his all action style and appetite for work around the field. He played 99 times for the Ospreys scoring 10 tries. He was so popular at the Ospreys fans set up the Filo Tiatia Appreciation Society on Facebook . Tiatia also had a Grogg made of him in 2008 and fought to keep Swansea Tennis Centre open in 2010.

== Coaching career ==
=== Ospreys ===
Tiatia retired at the age of 38 but stayed at the Ospreys as a coach. He was named head coach for the LV= Cup in 2011.

=== Toyota Verblitz ===
Filo Tiatia left his Ospreys coaching role at the end of the 2011–2012 season to become forwards coach at Japanese side Toyota Verblitz.

After one season as forwards coach for Toyota Verblitz, Tiatia was promoted to head coach for the 2012 -13 season.

==== Japanese national team ====
Tiatia was also involved with the Japanese national rugby team, under head coach Eddie Jones. He worked as a forwards coach during the 2013 Asian 5 Nations. Tiatia was later also involved with coaching the Japanese national team ahead of their November 2013 Test match against the All Blacks, which New Zealand won 54–6.

=== Sunwolves ===
In September 2016 he became head coach of Japan's Sunwolves Super Rugby side.

Tiatia's younger brother, Ace, has also played professional rugby at both provincial and Super Rugby levels, as well as making appearances for the Samoa national team.

=== Auckland ===
Tiatia was appointed as Forwards Coach at Mitre 10 Cup side Auckland under Head Coach Alama Ieremia in 2018. In 2021 t was announced he would be leaving the side, with the side's chief executive praising him for reaching "three semifinals, two home finals and one championship in 2018."

=== Dragons RFC ===
Tiatia was appointed to the backroom coaching staff as Defence Coach at Dragons in May 2024 under head coach Dai Flanagan.

Flanagan lost his job in November 2024 with the side having won once and lost five times to start the season, and Tiatia was appointed interim head coach until the end of the 2024-25 season.

In February 2025 Dragons RFC announced Tiatia would officially become the next head coach, on a "multi-year" contract. The side also offered to recruit his chosen assistant coach.

== Personal life ==
Tiatia and his wife Sally have five children, three of whom were born in Swansea during his time with the Ospreys. Tiatia's family have travelled between Wales, Japan and New Zealand throughout his playing and coaching career.
