= Ere Enari =

New Zealand rugby union player (born 1997)

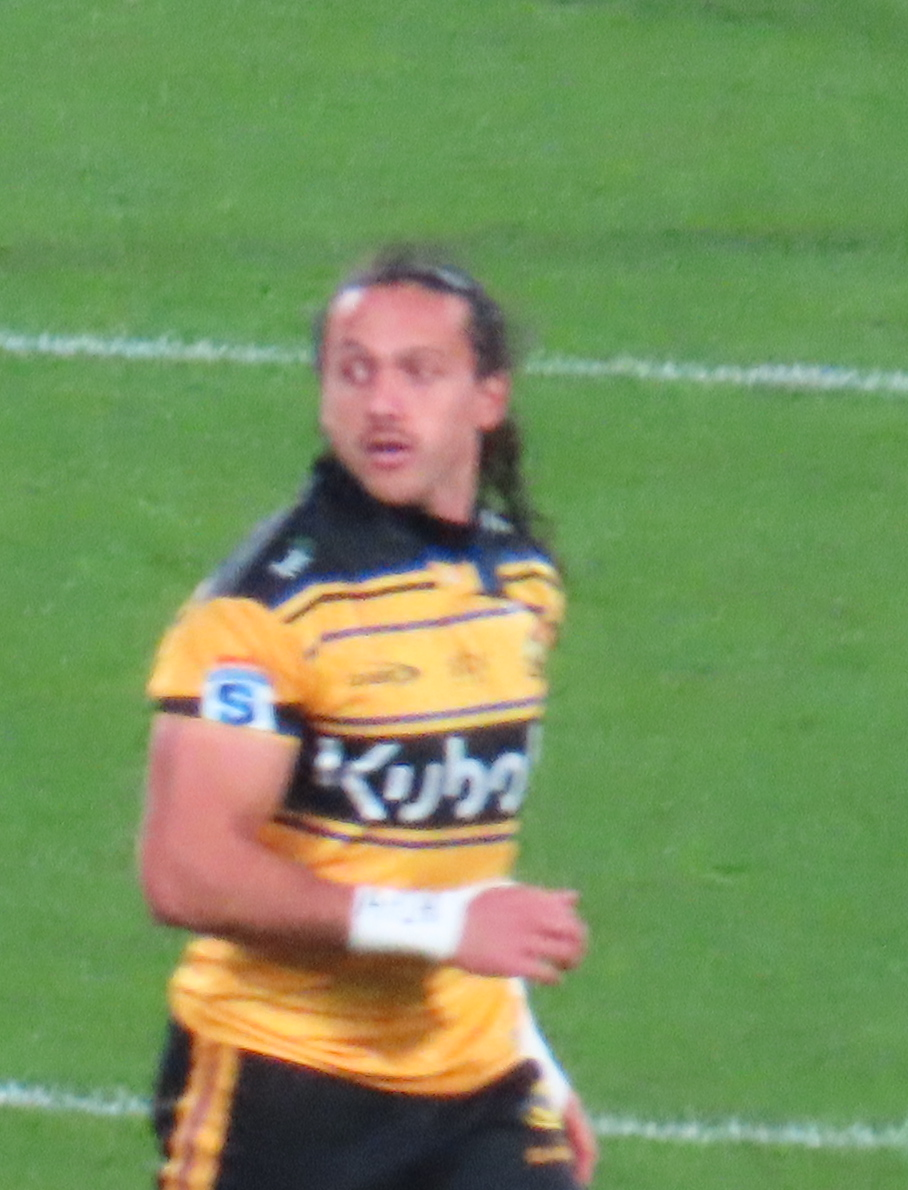
- Full name: Ereatara C. Enari
- Born: 30 May 1997 (age 29) Auckland, New Zealand
- Height: 1.78 m (5 ft 10 in)
- Weight: 84 kg (185 lb; 13 st 3 lb)
- School: St. Kentigern College
- University: Lincoln University
- Notable relative(s): Michael Jones (uncle); Eroni Clarke (uncle); Caleb Clarke (cousin)

Rugby union career
- Position: Halfback
- Current team: Dragons
Senior career
Years	Team	Apps	(Points)
2016–2020	Canterbury	40	(5)
2017–2021	Crusaders	9	(0)
2021–2022, 2024–2025	Hawke's Bay	40	(10)
2022–2024	Moana Pasifika	33	(0)
2025–2026	Hurricanes	27	(20)
2026–	Dragons		
- Correct as of 8 July 2026
International career
Years	Team	Apps	(Points)
2016–2017	New Zealand U20	7	(5)
2022–	Samoa	11	(0)
- Correct as of 20 July 2026

Ereatara Enari (born 30 May 1997) is a rugby union player, who currently plays as a halfback for the Dragons in the United Rugby Championship.

He previously played for the Hurricanes, Moana Pasifika and Crusaders in Super Rugby and for Hawke's Bay and Canterbury in New Zealand's domestic National Provincial Championship competition. He was born and raised in New Zealand, but has represented Manu Samoa internationally, for which he is eligible due to his Samoan heritage.

== Early career ==
Enari was born in Auckland, but grew up in Gisborne and Palmerston North. He attended Tū Toa until his last year of school moving to Saint Kentigern College in Auckland. After school, he moved to New Zealand's South Island to attend Lincoln University where he played Hawkins Cup rugby and won the championship in 2015, 2016 and 2017. During this time he also attended the Crusaders Academy.

== Senior career ==
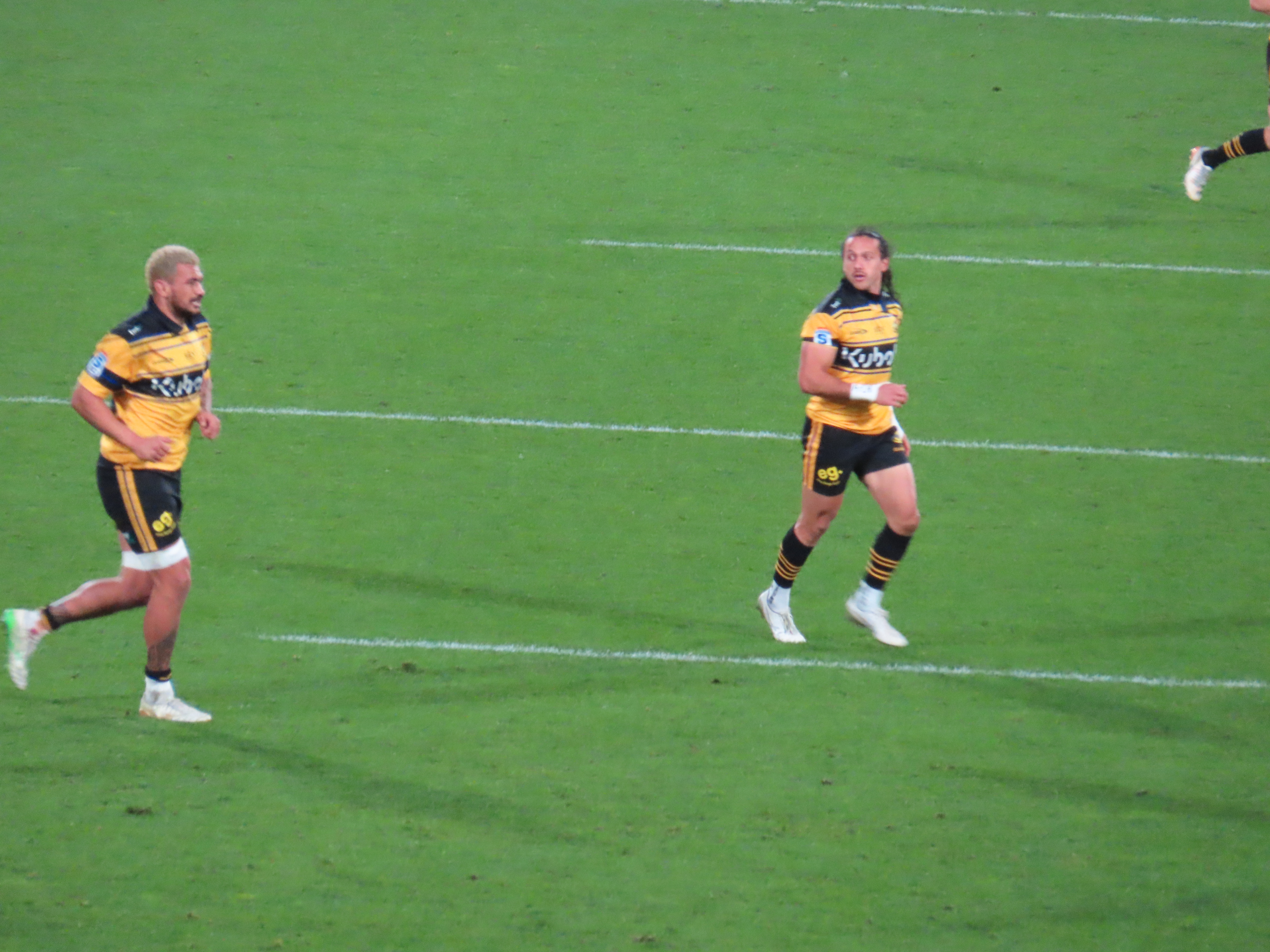
Enari and Isaia Walker-Leawere playing for the Hurricanes in the 2026 Super Rugby Pacific final

Enari was first named in the Canterbury squad ahead of the 2016 Mitre 10 Cup. Initially, he was expected to be 3rd choice halfback for the defending champions, however, season-ending injuries to first-choice Mitchell Drummond and his replacement Alby Mathewson saw Enari thrust into the starting number 9 jersey at 19 years old. He made 9 appearances, 7 of them from the start, as Canterbury retained their Mitre 10 Cup Premiership title which was their eighth success in nine seasons. On a pre-season training contract with the Crusaders in preparation for the NZ U20's tour in 2017, Enari made his Super Rugby debut in a round 1 victory against the Brumbies. He went on to play another 8 games between 2018 and 2020.

On 15 October 2021, Moana Pasifika announced via its social media accounts that the new Super Rugby franchise had signed Enari for the 2022 Super Rugby Pacific season. On 4 March 2022, he made his debut for Moana Pasifika in their inaugural Super Rugby game against the Crusaders.

After three seasons with Moana Pasifika, Enari joined the Hurricanes. On 12 November 2024, he was named their squad for the 2025 Super Rugby Pacific season.

Enari played two seasons for the Hurricanes, during which he played 27 games for the franchise. He left New Zealand as a Super Rugby champion after the Hurricanes won the title at the end of the 2026 Super Rugby Pacific season.

Welsh club Dragons announced on 20 May 2026 that it had signed Enari ahead of the 2026–27 United Rugby Championship season.

== International ==
Enari was a New Zealand Schoolboys representative in 2014 and also turned out for New Zealand Universities in 2015 touring Japan. He was involved with the New Zealand Under 20 team in 2016 where he worked with his future Canterbury head coach, Scott Robertson Missing out on World Cup selection in 2016, Enari became Vice Captain in 2017 and was a part of one of the most dominant Junior World Cup victories in decades. Unbeaten in the tournament and winning the final against England 64–17.

On 2 June 2022, Enari – who is of Samoan and Māori descent – was named in the Manu Samoa squad for the first time. He made his international debut for Samoa on 2 July 2022 against Australia A in their first game of the 2022 Pacific Nations Cup, which they won 31–26.
