= Kitione Kamikamica =

Fijian rugby union player (born 1996)

- Born: 27 April 1996 (age 30) Fiji
- Height: 188 cm (6 ft 2 in)
- Weight: 110 kg (243 lb; 17 st 5 lb)

Rugby union career
- Position: Flanker
- Current team: Brive
Senior career
Years	Team	Apps	(Points)
2017–2018	Bordeaux	3	(10)
2018–2019	Vannes	23	(15)
2019–	Brive	41	(30)
- Correct as of 1 November 2021
International career
Years	Team	Apps	(Points)
2016	Fiji U20	4	(6)
2021–	Fiji	1	(0)
- Correct as of 1 November 2021

Kitione Kamikamica (born 27 April 1996) is a Fijian rugby union player who plays for Brive in the Top 14. His playing position is flanker. Kamikamica signed for Brive in 2019, having previously represented Bordeaux and Vannes. He made his debut for Fiji in 2021 against New Zealand.
