= Lotu Inisi =

Tonga international rugby union player

- Full name: Maetaki He Lotu Inisi
- Born: 26 April 1999 (age 27) Tonga
- Height: 186 cm (6 ft 1 in)
- Weight: 110 kg (243 lb; 17 st 5 lb)
- Notable relative: Fine Inisi (brother)

Rugby union career
- Position(s): Flanker, Number 8
- Current team: Red Hurricanes Osaka
Senior career
Years	Team	Apps	(Points)
2019–2024	North Harbour	30	(30)
2022–2025	Moana Pasifika	17	(15)
2025-	Red Hurricanes Osaka	3	(10)
- Correct as of 22 May 2024
International career
Years	Team	Apps	(Points)
2022–	Tonga	9	(0)
National sevens team
Years	Team		Comps
2019–2020	Tonga Sevens		5
- Correct as of 22 November 2021

Lotu Inisi (born 26 April 1999) is a Tongan rugby union player who plays for Moana Pasifika in Super Rugby. His playing position is flanker. He was named in the Moana Pasifika squad for the 2022 Super Rugby Pacific season. He also represented North Harbour in the 2021 Bunnings NPC.
