= Anzelo Tuitavuki =

Tonga international rugby union player

- Full name: Anzelo Thomas More Tuitavuki
- Born: 10 October 1998 (age 28) Auckland, New Zealand
- Height: 1.82 m (6 ft 0 in)
- Weight: 98 kg (216 lb; 15 st 6 lb)
- School: Liston College

Rugby union career
- Position: Wing
- Current team: Dragons
Senior career
Years	Team	Apps	(Points)
2019–2023	Hawke's Bay	13	(30)
2022–2024	Moana Pasifika	12	(15)
2024–2026	Colomiers	33	(80)
2026–	Dragons	3	(10)
- Correct as of 5 June 2026
International career
Years	Team	Apps	(Points)
2022–	Tonga	11	(5)
- Correct as of 20 July 2026

Anzelo Tuitavuki (born 10 October 1998 in New Zealand) is a professional rugby union player, who currently plays as a wing for Welsh club Dragons in the United Rugby Championship. He previously played for Hawke's Bay in New Zealand's domestic National Provincial Championship competition, Moana Pasifika in Super Rugby and Colomiers in the French Pro D2.

On 27 May 2022, Tuitavuki – who is of Tongan descent and eligible to represent Tonga internationally – was named in the Tongan national team for the 2022 Pacific Nations Cup and the Asia/Pacific qualification match for the 2023 Rugby World Cup. He made his international test debut for Tonga on 2 July 2022 against Fiji.
