= François Carlo Mey =

Italian rugby union player

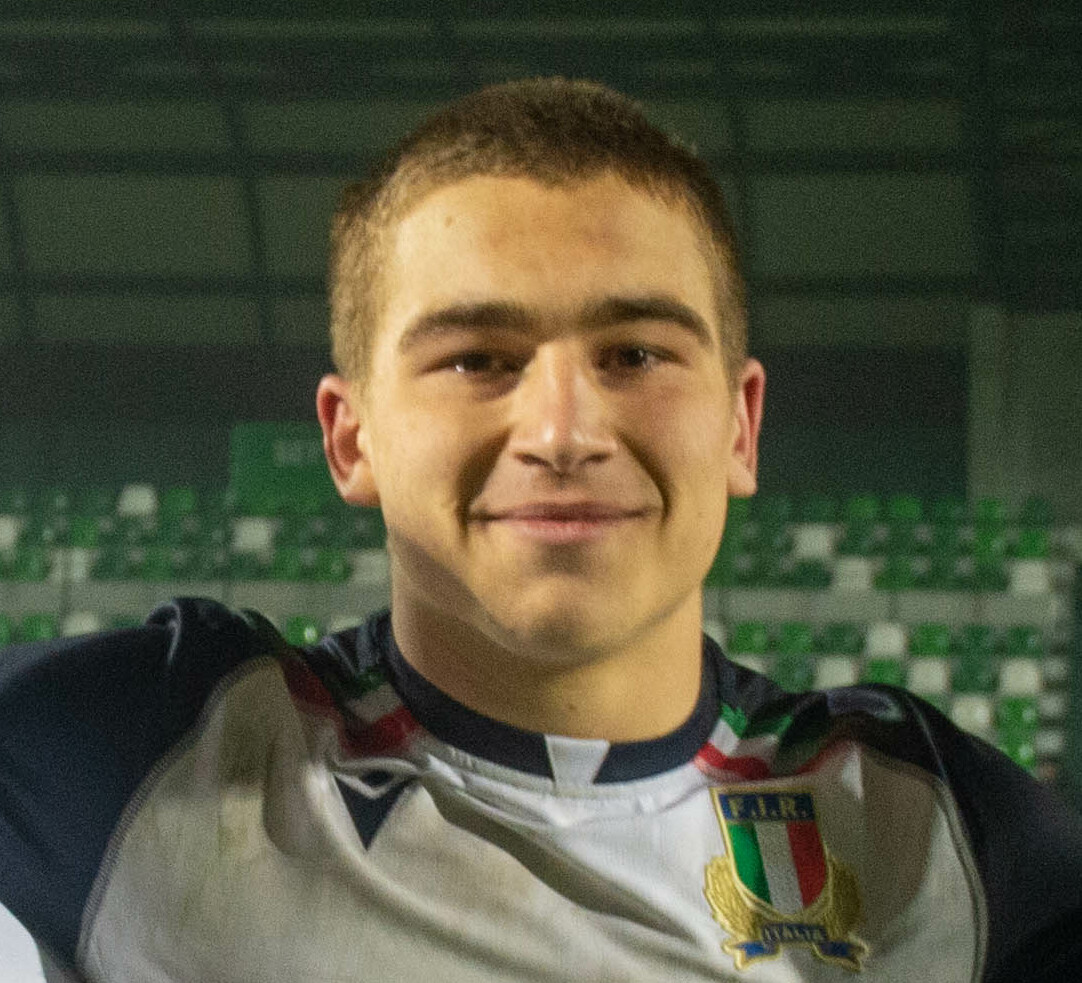
- Born: 1 July 2003 (age 23) Parma, Italy
- Height: 1.87 m (6 ft 1 1/2 in)
- Weight: 93 kg (205 lb)

Rugby union career
- Position(s): Centre, fullback
- Current team: Soyaux Angoulême
Youth career
- –2021: Amatori Parma Rugby
Senior career
| Years | Team | Apps | (Points) |
| 2021–2022 | Colorno | | |
| 2022–2025 | Clermont | 3 | (0) |
| → 2025 | Soyaux Angoulême | 8 | (10) |
| 2025– | Soyaux Angoulême | 10 | (5) |
- Correct as of 24 December 25
International career
| Years | Team | Apps | (Points) |
| 2022–2023 | Italy U20 | 13 | (20) |
| 2026 | Italy XV | 2 | (0) |
- Correct as of 20 September 24

François Carlo Mey (born 1 July 2003) is an Italian professional rugby union player who plays for Soyaux Angoulême in Pro D2. He usually plays centre or fullback.

== Early life ==
François Carlo Mey was born in Italy, to a South African father. He grew up in Parma, where he soon started playing rugby with the city's main club.

== Club career ==
From Parma, Mey moved to the neighbor Colorno in 2021, to play with the Top10 side Rugby Colorno, where he made his debut aged only 18.

The following summer, he moved to the French Top 14 side ASM Clermont Auvergne.

Mey made his first team sheet appearance for Clermont on the 21 January 2023, for the Champions Cup game against the Stormers.

During the 2024-2025 season he moved on loan to Soyaux Angoulême in Pro D2, where he the stayed for the following season.

== International career ==
François Carlo Mey is a youth international for Italy. In 2022, Mey was named in Italy U20s squad for annual Six Nations Under 20s Championship. On 28 January 2026 he was selected by Massimo Brunello to be part of an Italy XV squad for two official tests against Scotland A and Chile during 2026 men's rugby union internationals window of spring.
