= Jack Lam =

Samoa international rugby union player

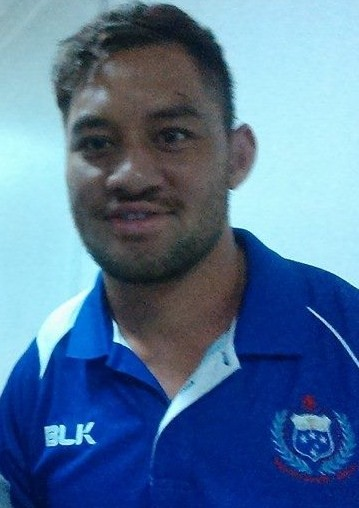
- Jack Tafa Lam
- Full name: Jack Tafa Lam
- Born: 18 November 1987 (age 38) Hamilton, New Zealand
- Height: 188 cm (6 ft 2 in)
- Weight: 110 kg (243 lb; 17 st 5 lb)
- School: St. Edmund's College
- Notable relative(s): Pat Lam (cousin); Seilala Mapusua (uncle)

Rugby union career
- Position(s): Flanker, Number 8
Senior career
| Years | Team | Apps | (Points) |
| 2008 | Tasman | 9 | (0) |
| 2009–2013 | Waikato | 36 | (10) |
| 2011–2014 | Hurricanes | 53 | (15) |
| 2014–2019 | Bristol | 71 | (115) |
| 2020–2021 | NEC Green Rockets | 9 | (10) |
| 2021-2023 | Waikato | 6 | (5) |
| 2022 | Moana Pasifika | 6 | (0) |
- Correct as of 27 May 2022
International career
| Years | Team | Apps | (Points) |
| 2006 | Australia U19 | 3 | (0) |
| 2013–2022 | Samoa | 40 | (40) |
- Correct as of 14 June 2022

Jack Tafa Lam (born 18 November 1987) is a New Zealand-born, Australian-raised rugby player who plays as a flanker for Moana Pasifika and internationally for Samoa.

Lam played seven matches for Tasman in 2008 before moving north to Waikato in 2009. He has international experience with the Samoan national team as well with the Australian Secondary Schools side. He has signed with Moana Pasifika for the 2022 Super Rugby Pacific season.

== Early life ==
Lam was born in Hamilton but moved to Wellington at an early age and then to Canberra where he attended St Edmund's College. He made the Australian Secondary Schools' side in 2004 and 2005. He is a cousin of former All Black and Samoan international Pat Lam. Lam's first year in the Australian Schools team was at centre, before he was converted into a loose forward the following year and made the team again as a flanker.

== Domestic career ==
Lam made his debut for Tasman in the 2008 Air New Zealand Cup competition, starting at number seven against Bay of Plenty.

After seven starts for Tasman in 2008 Lam returned to the Waikato to be part of the 2009 Chiefs Wider Training Squad. He also went on to make his first appearance for Waikato, again starting in the number seven position against Southland.

Lam continued his career with Waikato during the 2010 ITM Cup, mainly starting at openside flanker. At the end of 2010, Lam signed with the Wellington Super Rugby franchise the Hurricanes for 2011.

Lam started at openside flanker in every match in his rookie year in Super Rugby. He returned for another full season with Waikato in the 2011 ITM Cup.

Lam made the switch to Europe in 2014, joining then Greene King IPA Championship side Bristol. In December 2015 he signed a new contract for two more seasons with Bristol (until 2018).
