= Elliot Dee =

Welsh rugby union player

- Full name: Elliot Mitchell Dee
- Born: 7 March 1994 (age 32) Newport, Wales
- Height: 1.86 m (6 ft 1 in)
- Weight: 106 kg (234 lb; 16 st 10 lb)
- School: Newbridge School

Rugby union career
- Position: Hooker
- Current team: Dragons
Senior career
| Years | Team | Apps | (Points) |
| 2013– | Dragons | 169 | (145) |
International career
| Years | Team | Apps | (Points) |
| 2013–2014 | Wales U20 | 18 | (5) |
| 2017– | Wales | 55 | (15) |

Elliot Mitchell Dee (born 7 March 1994) is a Welsh professional rugby union player who plays as a hooker for United Rugby Championship club Dragons and the Wales national team.

== Early and personal life ==
Dee was born in Newport and attended Newbridge Comprehensive School. He has two children.

== Club career ==
Dee began his rugby career at Penallta RFC, and got his first Wales cap playing for the Under 18s side.

He played senior rugby in the Premiership and Premiership for Newbridge, Pontypool, Bedwas and Cross Keys before joining the Dragons as a professional.

== International career ==
Dee is a former Wales under-20 international. He was included in the Wales players squad for the 2017 Autumn internationals. He was included in the Wales senior squad for the first time for the 2017 Autumn Series and made his debut off the bench in the 13-6 win over Georgia on 18 November 2017. His first start for Wales came in Round 4 of the 2018 6 Nations campaign against Italy. He came off the bench in the four other fixtures.

It was a similar situation in the 2019 Grand Slam season, when he started in the win over Italy in Rome and came on as a replacement in the other four fixtures. He played a part in 13 of Wales’ record run of 14 successive victories 2018-19.

== Career statistics ==
=== List of international tries ===
| No. | Date | Venue | Opponent | Score | Result | Competition |
|---|---|---|---|---|---|---|
| 1 | 3 July 2021 | Millennium Stadium, Cardiff, Wales | Canada | 31–5 | 68–12 | 2021 July rugby union tests |
| 2 | 10 September 2023 | Nouveau Stade de Bordeaux, Bordeaux, France | Fiji | 30–14 | 32–26 | 2023 Rugby World Cup |

as of 10 September 2023
