= Fine Inisi =

Tongan rugby union player

- Born: 19 May 1998 (age 28) Auckland, New Zealand
- Height: 1.87 m (6 ft 2 in)
- Weight: 95 kg (209 lb; 14 st 13 lb)
- School: Westlake Boys High School
- Notable relative: Lotu Inisi (brother)

Rugby union career
- Position(s): Centre, Wing
- Current team: Moana Pasifika
Senior career
Years	Team	Apps	(Points)
2019–2022	North Harbour	17	(10)
2022–2025	Moana Pasifika	30	(45)
2025–	Dragons	22	(20)
- Correct as of 28 May 2024
International career
Years	Team	Apps	(Points)
2021–	Tonga	9	(10)
- Correct as of 28 May 2024
National sevens team
Years	Team		Comps
2019–2020	Tonga		5
- Correct as of 28 August 2023

Fine Inisi (born 19 May 1998) is a professional rugby union player who plays as a centre for Super Rugby club Moana Pasifika. Born in New Zealand, he represents Tonga at international level after qualifying on ancestry grounds.

== Club career ==
He was named in the Moana Pasifika squad for the 2022 Super Rugby Pacific season. He also represented North Harbour in the 2021 Bunnings NPC. Inisi is a Tongan international, having made his debut in 2021 against New Zealand, having previously represented Tonga at rugby sevens.

On 12 May 2025, Inisi would move to Wales to join region Dragons in the URC competition from the 2025-26 season.
