= 2025–26 Scarlets season =

Scarlets
- 2025–26 season
- Head coach: Dwayne Peel
- Chairman: Simon Muderack
- United Rugby Championship: 14th
- Champions Cup: Pool stage, 6th
- Highest home attendance: 12,105 vs Ospreys (26 December 2025)
- Lowest home attendance: 5,029 vs Zebre (20 March 2026)
- Average home attendance: 7,138

The 2025–26 season was the 23rd in the history of the Scarlets, a Welsh regional rugby union side based in Llanelli, Carmarthenshire. In this season, they competed in the United Rugby Championship, its URC Welsh Shield competition and the European Rugby Champions Cup. Managing just four wins, they finished 14th in the United Rugby Championship, and their performance against the other Welsh teams meant they finished last in the Welsh Shield, although ahead of the Dragons on the league table. They also lost all four of their pool matches in the Champions Cup, finishing bottom of Pool 4.

== Friendlies ==
As part of their pre-season preparations, the Scarlets announced they would face both Llandovery and Carmarthen Quins on 6 September. The day would see the Scarlets play 30 minutes against Llandovery followed by 30 minutes against Carmarthen Quins (with the two Super Rygbi Cymru sides facing each other in a final 30 minute game). In the end, the games were played as two 40-minute halves and the contest between Llandovery and Carmarthen Quins was cancelled.

Date	Opponents	H / A	Result F–A	Scorers	Attendance
6 September 2025	Llandovery	A	26–7	Tries: H. O'Connor 5' m, Mathias 11' c, Nicholas 23' c, Blacker 29' c Conversions: Hawkins (3) 11', 23', 29'	
6 September 2025	Carmarthen Quins	A	5–7	Try: Lewis 34' m	
13 September 2025	Dragons	A	28–33	Tries: Plumtree 8' c, Mee 31' c, Blacker 58' c, Nicolas 73' c Conversions: Costelow (3) 8', 31', 73', Hawkins 58'	4,263
21 November 2025	Harlequins	A	19–45	Tries: T. Lewis (2) 11' c 55' c, Anderson 18' m Conversions: Costelow 12', Leggatt-Jones 56'	

== United Rugby Championship ==
=== League phase ===
==== Fixtures ====
The fixture schedule for the 2025–26 United Rugby Championship season was announced on 21 May 2025. The game against Connacht was originally scheduled for 4 October 2025, but was postponed due to travel disruptions caused by Storm Amy. The rearranged fixture was played on 13 March 2026.

Date	Opponents	H / A	Result F–A	Scorers	Attendance	Table position
27 September 2025	Munster	H	21–34	Tries: Murray 48' c, Mee 63' c, Plumtree 76' c Conversions: Costelow (2) 49', 64', Hawkins 76'	9,079	12th
10 October 2025	Stormers	H	0–34		6,114	16th
18 October 2025	Lions	A	18–29	Tries: Penalty try 68', Roberts 77' m Penalties: Costelow (2) 13', 50'	1,771	16th
25 October 2025	Sharks	A	19–29	Tries: van der Merwe 16' c, Murray 21' c, Rogers 45' m Conversions: Costelow (2) 17', 22'	9,528	16th
29 November 2025	Glasgow Warriors	H	23–0	Tries: MacLeod 16' c, Page 49' c Conversions: Costelow (2/2) 17', 50'; Penalties: Costelow (3) 25', 31', 67'	5,444	16th
19 December 2025	Cardiff	A	21–17	Tries: James 23' c, Davies (2) 51' c, 57' c Conversions: Hawkins (3) 24', 52', 58'	11,278	16th
26 December 2025	Ospreys	H	19–26	Tries: Roberts (2) 35' c, 69' m, Taylor 80' c Conversions: Hawkins (2) 35', 80'	12,105	15th
1 January 2026	Dragons	A	5–28	Try: Mee 35' m	8,369	16th
24 January 2026	Ulster	H	27–22	Tries: Murray 10' c, Macleod 32' c, Mee 80+3' c Conversions: Costelow (3/3) 11', 33', 80+4'; Penalties: Costelow (2) 6', 72'	6,695	16th
30 January 2026	Benetton	A	20–20	Tries: Davies 42' c, Lewis 57' m, Page 75' m Conversion: Leggatt-Jones (1/3) 43'; Penalty: Leggatt-Jones 15'	4,840	15th
27 February 2026	Edinburgh	A	19–24	Tries: Roberts (2) 22' c, 62' m, Lousi 28' c Conversions: Leggatt-Jones (2) 23', 28'	6,657	15th
13 March 2026	Connacht	A	14–31	Tries: Roberts 49' c, Jones 53' c Conversions: Leggatt-Jones (2/2) 50', 54'	5,649	15th
20 March 2026	Zebre	H	36–17	Tries: Taylor (2) 2' m, 65' c, Lousi 13' c, Page 25' c, Mee 36' m, Davis 57' m Conversions: Leggatt-Jones (3/6) 14', 26', 66'	5,029	14th
27 March 2026	Leinster	A	19–36	Tries: Roberts 17' c, Rogers 57' m, Douglas 72' c Conversions: Hawkins (2/3) 18', 73'	15,301	14th
18 April 2026	Cardiff	H	24–28	Tries: Plumtree 23' m, J. Williams 46' c, Blacker 48' m, Murray 54' c Conversions: Hawkins (2/4) 47', 55'	9,025	14th
25 April 2026	Bulls	H	21–23	Tries: Woolley 9' m, James 20' m, Anderson 50' m Penalties: Hawkins (2) 63', 75'	5,180	15th
9 May 2026	Ospreys	A	20–27	Tries: Douglas 10' m, Plumtree 47' m, Murray 57' c Conversion: Hawkins (1/3) 58'; Penalty: Hawkins 42'	7,700	14th
16 May 2026	Dragons	H	35–35	Tries: Plumtree (2) 2' c, 15' c, Macleod 51' c, Taylor 59' c, Page 75' c Conversions: Hawkins (5/5) 2', 16', 51', 59', 76'	7,418	14th

==== Tables ====
Overall

Pos	Team	Pld	W	D	L	PF	PA	PD	TF	TA	TB	LB	Pts	Qualification
1	Glasgow Warriors	18	13	0	5	479	338	+141	72	48	11	2	65	Qualification for the Champions Cup and knockout stage
2	Leinster (CH)	18	12	0	6	515	370	+145	77	51	13	2	63	Qualification for the Champions Cup and knockout stage
3	Stormers	18	12	1	5	504	344	+160	63	48	9	1	60	Qualification for the Champions Cup and knockout stage
4	Bulls (RU)	18	12	0	6	576	406	+170	82	59	10	1	59	Qualification for the Champions Cup and knockout stage
5	Munster	18	11	0	7	396	376	+20	59	51	8	3	55	Qualification for the Champions Cup and knockout stage
6	Cardiff	18	11	0	7	353	372	−19	52	52	7	4	55	Qualification for the Champions Cup and knockout stage
7	Lions	18	10	1	7	532	473	+59	73	70	9	3	54	Qualification for the Champions Cup and knockout stage
8	Connacht	18	10	0	8	442	395	+47	62	56	10	4	54	Qualification for the Champions Cup and knockout stage
9	Ulster	18	9	1	8	494	420	+74	72	60	10	4	52	Qualification for the Challenge Cup
10	Sharks	18	8	1	9	467	428	+39	71	57	9	3	46	Qualification for the Challenge Cup
11	Ospreys	18	7	2	9	376	454	−78	55	69	4	3	39	Qualification for the Challenge Cup
12	Edinburgh	18	7	0	11	362	439	−77	57	66	6	4	38	Qualification for the Challenge Cup
13	Benetton	18	6	2	10	327	493	−166	41	71	4	1	33	Qualification for the Challenge Cup
14	Scarlets	18	4	2	12	361	460	−99	52	63	3	5	28	Qualification for the Challenge Cup
15	Dragons	18	3	4	11	350	481	−131	46	71	4	4	28	Qualification for the Challenge Cup
16	Zebre	18	2	0	16	312	587	−275	43	85	3	4	15	Qualification for the Challenge Cup

Updated to match(es) played on 16 May 2026. Source: UnitedRugby.com
Rules for classification: Tiebreakers for teams tied on points: 1) Number of matches won 2) The difference between points for and points against 3) The number of tries scored 4) The most points scored 5) The difference between tries for and tries against 6) The fewest red cards received 7) The fewest yellow cards received.

Welsh Shield

2025–26 United Rugby Championship Regional Shield tables
(Wales) Welsh Shield
	Team	P	W	D	L	PF	PA	PD	TF	TA	TBP	LBP	Pts	Pos overall
1	(Wales) Ospreys	6	4	1	1	145	117	+28	21	17	2	1	21	11
2	(Wales) Cardiff	6	4	0	2	137	135	+2	20	20	3	1	20	6
3	(Wales) Dragons	6	1	2	3	131	124	+7	17	19	2	3	13	15
4	(Wales) Scarlets	6	1	1	4	124	161	–37	19	21	2	3	11	14
If teams are level at any stage, tiebreakers are applied in the following order: 1. number of matches won 2. the difference between points for and points against 3. the number of tries scored 4. the most points scored 5. the difference between tries for and tries against 6. the fewest red cards received 7. the fewest yellow cards received
Green background indicates teams currently leading the regional shield. Upon the conclusion of the regular season, these teams win their respective regional shields. (S) : URC Shield champion

== European Rugby Champions Cup ==
The Scarlets qualified for the 2025–26 European Rugby Champions Cup as one of the top eight finishers in the 2024–25 United Rugby Championship. They were drawn in Pool 4 alongside URC rivals Bulls (who they will not meet in the pool stage as per the rules of the competition) along with reigning European champions Union Bordeaux Bègles and Pau from France, and Bristol Bears and last year's Champions Cup runners up Northampton Saints from the English Premiership.

=== Pool stage ===
==== Fixtures ====
Date	Opponents	H / A	Result F–A	Scorers	Attendance	Table position
6 December 2025	Bristol Bears	H	16–17	Try: Davies 32' c Conversion: Costelow (1/1) 33'; Penalties: Costelow (3/3) 23', 49', 52'	7,366	
13 December 2025	Bordeaux Bègles	A	21–50	Tries: Anderson (2) 9' c , 64' c, Thomas 30' c Conversions: Hawkins (2/2) 10', 31', Costelow 65'	32,930	
10 January 2026	Pau	H	38–47	Tries: Macleod (2) 23' c, 37' c, Hughes 40' c, Plumtree 43' c, Hawkins 50' c Conversions: Hawkins (5/5) 24', 38', 40+1', 44', 51'; Penalty: Hawkins (1/1) 8'	5,063	
18 January 2026	Northampton Saints	A	28–43	Tries: Elias 2' c, Hughes 24' c, Costelow 66' c, J. Davies 71' c Conversions: Costelow (4/4) 3', 25', 67', 72'	15,153	6th

==== Table ====
European Rugby Champions Cup Pool 4
Pos	Team	Pld	W	D	L	PF	PA	PD	TF	TA	TB	LB	Pts	Qualification
1	(France) Bordeaux Bègles (1)	4	4	0	0	173	97	+76	27	14	4	0	20	Home Champions Cup round of 16
2	(England) Northampton Saints (5)	4	3	0	1	156	110	+46	23	16	4	0	16	Home Champions Cup round of 16
3	(England) Bristol Bears (10)	4	3	0	1	154	104	+50	23	13	2	0	14	Away Champions Cup round of 16
4	(South Africa) Bulls (15)	4	1	0	3	113	181	−68	17	27	3	0	7	Away Champions Cup round of 16
5	(France) Pau (12CC)	4	1	0	3	110	160	−50	15	23	1	1	6	Away Challenge Cup round of 16
6	(Wales) Scarlets	4	0	0	4	103	157	−54	13	24	2	1	3	

Source: EPCR
Rules for classification: Tiebreakers for teams tied on points: 1) Number of matches won; 2) Difference between points for and against; 3) Total number of points for; 4) Aggregate number of points scored in matches between tied teams; 5) Number of matches won excluding the first match, then the second and so on until the tie is settled.

== Statistics ==
(+ in the Apps column denotes substitute appearance, positions listed are the ones they have started a game in during the season)

Pos.	Name	United Rugby Championship						European Champions Cup						Total						Discipline	
Pos.	Name	Apps	Try	Con	Pen	Drop	Pts	Apps	Try	Con	Pen	Drop	Pts	Apps	Try	Con	Pen	Drop	Pts	Yellow card	Red card
FB	(Wales) Jac Davies	3	0	0	0	0	0	3	1	0	0	0	5	6	1	0	0	0	5	0	0
FB	(England) Ioan Jones	0+1	0	0	0	0	0	0	0	0	0	0	0	0+1	0	0	0	0	0	0	0
FB/WG	(Wales) Blair Murray	6	3	0	0	0	15	2	0	0	0	0	0	8	3	0	0	0	15	0	0
FB	(Wales) Ioan Nicholas	2+1	0	0	0	0	0	0+1	0	0	0	0	0	2+2	0	0	0	0	0	0	0
WG	(Wales) Iori Badham	1+1	0	0	0	0	0	0	0	0	0	0	0	1+1	0	0	0	0	0	0	0
WG	(Wales) Tomi Lewis	3	1	0	0	0	5	1	0	0	0	0	0	4	1	0	0	0	5	0	0
WG/FB	(Wales) Ellis Mee	8	3	0	0	0	15	3	0	0	0	0	0	11	3	0	0	0	15	0	0
WG/FB	(Wales) Tom Rogers	8	1	0	0	0	5	2	0	0	0	0	0	10	1	0	0	0	5	0	0
CE/FH	(Wales) Joe Hawkins	6+2	0	6	0	0	12	3+1	1	7	1	0	22	9+3	1	13	1	0	34	0	0
CE	(Wales) Eddie James	5	1	0	0	0	5	4	0	0	0	0	0	9	1	0	0	0	5	0	0
CE	(Wales) Gabe McDonald	0+1	0	0	0	0	0	0	0	0	0	0	0	0+1	0	0	0	0	0	0	0
CE	(Wales) Macs Page	4+5	2	0	0	0	10	0+2	0	0	0	0	0	4+7	2	0	0	0	10	1	0
CE	(Wales) Joe Roberts	7+2	5	0	0	0	25	2+1	0	0	0	0	0	9+3	5	0	0	0	25	0	0
CE	(Wales) Johnny Williams	6+2	0	0	0	0	0	1	0	0	0	0	0	7+2	0	0	0	0	0	1	0
FH	(Wales) Sam Costelow	5+1	0	9	7	0	39	2+1	1	6	3	0	26	7+2	1	15	10	0	65	0	0
FH	(Wales) Carwyn Leggatt-Jones	2+2	0	3	1	0	9	0+1	0	0	0	0	0	2+3	0	3	1	0	9	0	0
FH	(Wales) Billy McBryde	0+1	0	0	0	0	0	0	0	0	0	0	0	0+1	0	0	0	0	0	0	0
FH	(Wales) Elis Price	0+1	0	0	0	0	0	0	0	0	0	0	0	0+1	0	0	0	0	0	0	0
SH	(Wales) Dane Blacker	1+7	0	0	0	0	0	1+2	0	0	0	0	0	2+9	0	0	0	0	0	0	0
SH	(Wales) Gareth Davies	7	3	0	0	0	15	1+1	1	0	0	0	5	8+1	4	0	0	0	20	1	0
SH	(Wales) Archie Hughes	3+4	0	0	0	0	0	2+1	2	0	0	0	10	5+5	2	0	0	0	10	0	0
N8	(Australia) Fletcher Anderson	7	0	0	0	0	0	4	2	0	0	0	10	11	2	0	0	0	10	0	0
N8/FL	(Wales) Taine Plumtree	7	1	0	0	0	5	2	1	0	0	0	5	9	2	0	0	0	10	3	0
N8	(Wales) Ben Williams	0+2	0	0	0	0	0	0	0	0	0	0	0	0+2	0	0	0	0	0	0	0
FL	(Wales) Tristan Davies	2	0	0	0	0	0	0	0	0	0	0	0	2	0	0	0	0	0	0	0
FL	(Wales) Dan Davis	3+5	0	0	0	0	0	1+3	0	0	0	0	0	3+8	0	0	0	0	0	0	0
FL	(Wales) Josh Macleod	6	2	0	0	0	10	4	2	0	0	0	10	10	4	0	0	0	20	1	0
FL	(South Africa) Jarrod Taylor	3+6	1	0	0	0	5	0+2	0	0	0	0	0	3+8	1	0	0	0	5	1	0
LK	(Wales) Jake Ball	6+1	0	0	0	0	0	4	0	0	0	0	0	10+1	0	0	0	0	0	0	0
LK	(England) Harvey Cuckson	4+1	0	0	0	0	0	0	0	0	0	0	0	4+1	0	0	0	0	0	2	0
LK	(Australia) Steve Cummins	0+1	0	0	0	0	0	0	0	0	0	0	0	0+1	0	0	0	0	0	0	0
LK	(Australia) Max Douglas	8	0	0	0	0	0	3	0	0	0	0	0	11	0	0	0	0	0	1	1
LK	(Wales) Dan Gemine	0+1	0	0	0	0	0	0	0	0	0	0	0	0+1	0	0	0	0	0	0	0
LK	(England) Alex Groves	1+1	0	0	0	0	0	0	0	0	0	0	0	1+1	0	0	0	0	0	0	0
LK	(Tonga) Sam Lousi	7	1	0	0	0	5	2+1	0	0	0	0	0	9+1	1	0	0	0	5	0	0
LK	(Wales) Jac Price	1+3	0	0	0	0	0	0+1	0	0	0	0	0	1+4	0	0	0	0	0	0	0
HK	(Wales) Ryan Elias	4+1	0	0	0	0	0	3+1	1	0	0	0	5	7+2	1	0	0	0	5	0	0
HK	(Wales) Kirby Myhill	0+4	0	0	0	0	0	0	0	0	0	0	0	0+4	0	0	0	0	0	0	0
HK	(Wales) Harry Thomas	1	0	0	0	0	0	0	0	0	0	0	0	1	0	0	0	0	0	0	0
HK	(South Africa) Marnus van der Merwe	6+4	1	0	0	0	5	1+3	0	0	0	0	0	7+7	1	0	0	0	5	0	0
PR	(Scotland) Alec Hepburn	5+3	0	0	0	0	0	1+2	0	0	0	0	0	6+5	0	0	0	0	0	0	0
PR	(Australia) Archer Holz	6+1	0	0	0	0	0	1	0	0	0	0	0	7+1	0	0	0	0	0	0	0
PR	(Wales) Kemsley Mathias	6	0	0	0	0	0	3+1	0	0	0	0	0	9+1	0	0	0	0	0	1	0
PR	(Wales) Josh Morse	0+4	0	0	0	0	0	0	0	0	0	0	0	0+4	0	0	0	0	0	0	0
PR	(Wales) Harri O'Connor	0+3	0	0	0	0	0	0+3	0	0	0	0	0	0+6	0	0	0	0	0	0	0
PR	(Wales) Sam O'Connor	0+4	0	0	0	0	0	0+1	0	0	0	0	0	0+5	0	0	0	0	0	0	0
PR	(Wales) Henry Thomas	5+6	0	0	0	0	0	3+1	1	0	0	0	5	8+7	1	0	0	0	5	0	0

Stats correct as of match played 27 February 2026

== Transfers ==
=== In ===
Date confirmed	Pos.	Name	From	Ref.
13 March 2025	CE	(Wales) Joe Hawkins	(England) Exeter Chiefs	
29 April 2025	LK	(Wales) Jake Ball	Unattached	
7 May 2025	SH	(Wales) Dane Blacker	Dragons	
16 May 2025	FB	(England) Ioan Jones	(England) Gloucester	
3 June 2025	FL	(Wales) Tristan Davies	Ospreys	
22 September 2025	HK	(Wales) Kirby Myhill	(United States) Miami Sharks (loan)	
9 October 2025	LK	(Australia) Steve Cummins	Dragons (loan)	
13 October 2025	N8	(New Zealand) Fletcher Anderson	(New Zealand) Crusaders	
15 October 2025	LK	(England) Harvey Cuckson	(England) Bath Rugby (loan)	
15 October 2025	LK	(England) Alex Groves	(South Africa) Stormers (loan)	
26 January 2026	FH	(Wales) Billy McBryde	RGC 1404 (loan)	
25 March 2026	HK	(Wales) George Roberts	Dragons (loan)	

=== Out ===
Date confirmed	Pos.	Name	To	Ref.
10 March 2025	FH	(Wales) Ioan Lloyd	Cardiff	
23 April 2025	LK	(Scotland) Alex Craig	(Scotland) Glasgow Warriors	
13 May 2025	FH	(England) Charlie Titcombe	(England) Leicester Tigers	
2 June 2025	PR	(Wales) Sam Wainwright	Cardiff	
15 June 2025	LK	(Wales) Ed Scragg	(England) Blackheath	
3 July 2025	FL	(Tonga) Vaea Fifita	(France) Montauban	
4 July 2025	LK	(Wales) Morgan Jones	(England) Doncaster Knights	
15 August 2025	HK	(Wales) Shaun Evans	Carmarthen Quins	
30 August 2025	WG	(Wales) Steff Evans	Carmarthen Quins	
9 September 2025	SH	(Wales) Efan Jones	(England) Ampthill	
