= List of 2025–26 United Rugby Championship transfers =

This is a list of player transfers involving United Rugby Championship teams before or during 2025–26 season.

== Benetton ==
=== Players in ===
- (Samoa) So'otala Fa'aso'o from (France) Perpignan
- (New Zealand) Jadin Kingi from (Italy) Mogliano
- (Italy) Destiny Aminu from (Italy) Mogliano
- (Argentina) Giuliano Avaca from (Italy) Mogliano
- (Italy) Marcos Gallorini promoted from Academy
- (Italy) Nicholas Gasperini from (Italy) Mogliano
- (Italy) Giulio Marini from (Italy) Mogliano
- (Italy) Federico Zanandrea from (Italy) Mogliano
- (Australia) John Bryant from (Australia) Queensland Reds (short-term loan)
- (Australia) Richie Asiata from (Australia) Queensland Reds (short-term loan)
- (Australia) Louis Werchon from (Australia) Queensland Reds (short-term loan)
- (Argentina) Tomás Montilla from (Italy) Petrarca
- (Argentina) Nicolás Roger from (Argentina) Tarucas
- (Argentina) Tomás Medina from (Argentina) Tarucas

=== Players out ===
- (Italy) Ignacio Brex to (France) Toulon
- Lautaro Bazán to Argentina Sevens
- (Argentina) Agustín Creevy (retired)
- (Italy) Riccardo Genovese to (Italy) Mogliano
- (Italy) Edoardo Iachizzi to (France) Vannes
- (Italy) Filippo Drago to (Italy) Mogliano
- (Italy) Nicolò Casilio to (Italy) Valorugby Emilia
- (Italy) Marco Zanon to (Italy) Zebre Parma
- (South Africa) Gideon Koegelenberg to (South Africa) Sharks (Currie Cup)
- (Italy) Toa Halafihi to (Italy) Petrarca Padova
- (Italy) Marco Manfredi to (England) Northampton Saints
- (Argentina) Tomás Albornoz to (France) Toulon
- (Argentina) Giuliano Avaca to (Argentina) Dogos XV
- (Argentina) Tomás Montilla to (Argentina) Dogos XV
- (Argentina) Nicolás Roger to (Argentina) Dogos XV

== Bulls ==
=== Players in ===
- (South Africa) Nico Janse van Rensburg from (France) Montpellier
- (South Africa) Handré Pollard from (England) Leicester Tigers
- (South Africa) Jeandre Rudolph from (South Africa) Cheetahs
- (South Africa) Jan Serfontein from (France) Montpellier
- (South Africa) Paul de Wet from (South Africa) Stormers
- (South Africa) Neil le Roux from (England) Bath

=== Players out ===
- (South Africa) Bernard van der Linde to (England) Bath
- (South Africa) Tielman Nieuwoudt to (South Africa) Cheetahs
- (South Africa) Boeta Chamberlain to (England) Newcastle Red Bulls
- (South Africa) Cornel Smit to (Wales) Cardiff
- (South Africa) Aphiwe Dyantyi to (France) Narbonne

== Cardiff ==
=== Players in ===
- (Wales) Ioan Lloyd from (Wales) Scarlets
- (Wales) Taine Basham from (Wales) Dragons
- (Scotland) Javan Sebastian from (Scotland) Edinburgh
- (Wales) Sam Wainwright from (Wales) Scarlets
- (Wales) George Nott from (Wales) Dragons
- (Wales) Ieuan Davies from (England) Bath (season-long loan)
- (Wales) Ioan Emanuel from (England) Bath (season-long loan)
- (Wales) Leigh Halfpenny from (England) Harlequins (short-term deal)
- (England) Will Rigg from (England) Exeter Chiefs (short-term loan)
- (Wales) Osian Roberts from (England) Sale Sharks (short-term loan)
- (South Africa) Cornel Smit from (South Africa) Bulls

=== Players out ===
- (Wales) Thomas Young to (Wales) Dragons
- (England) Rhys Litterick to (Scotland) Edinburgh
- (South Africa) Tinus de Beer to (Wales) Dragons
- (Wales) Seb Davies to (Wales) Dragons
- (Wales) Gwilym Bradley (released)
- (Wales) Regan Grace (released)
- (Samoa) Rey Lee-Lo (retired)
- (England) Gabriel Hamer-Webb to (England) Leicester Tigers
- (Wales) Mackenzie Martin to (Wales) Dragons (season-long loan)
- (Wales) Efan Daniel to (Wales) Ospreys
- (Wales) Ellis Bevan to (England) Bristol Bears (short-term loan)
- (Wales) Joe Cowell to (England) Bedford Blues (short-term loan)
- (Ireland) Ed Byrne to (Ireland) Leinster (short-term loan)

== Connacht ==
=== Players in ===
- (New Zealand) Sam Gilbert from (New Zealand) Highlanders
- (Ireland) Harry West (promoted from Academy)
- (Ireland) Finn Treacy (promoted from Academy)
- (Ireland) John Devine (promoted from Academy)

=== Players out ===
- (Ireland) JJ Hanrahan to (Ireland) Munster
- (Ireland) Andrew Smith to (Ireland) Munster
- (England) Piers O'Conor to (Scotland) Edinburgh
- (Ireland) Conor Oliver to (England) Ealing Trailfinders
- (Argentina) Santiago Cordero to (Argentina) Regatas

== Dragons ==
=== Players in ===
- (Wales) Dillon Lewis from (England) Harlequins
- (Wales) Harry Beddall from (England) Leicester Tigers
- (Wales) Codi Purnell from (England) Bath
- (Wales) James Talamai from (England) Saracens
- (Wales) Thomas Young from (Wales) Cardiff
- (Wales) Dylan Kelleher-Griffiths (promoted from Academy)
- (England) Levi Douglas from (France) Biarritz
- (South Africa) Tinus de Beer from (Wales) Cardiff
- (Tonga) Fine Inisi from (New Zealand) Moana Pasifika
- (Wales) Wyn Jones from (England) Harlequins
- (Wales) Seb Davies from (Wales) Cardiff
- (Tonga) Fetuli Paea from (Italy) Zebre Parma
- (Wales) Mackenzie Martin from (Wales) Cardiff (season-long loan)
- (Wales) Jac Lloyd from (Wales) Newport
- (Wales) David Richards from (Wales) Newport
- (South Africa) Robert Hunt from (South Africa) Cheetahs
- (Ireland) Niall Armstrong from (England) Exeter Chiefs
- (Wales) George Roberts from (England) Doncaster Knights
- (South Africa) Cebo Dlamini from (South Africa) Griquas (short-term loan)

=== Players out ===
- (Wales) Taine Basham to (Wales) Cardiff
- (Wales) Dan Lydiate (retired)
- (Wales) Dane Blacker to (Wales) Scarlets
- (Wales) Josh Thomas to (England) Coventry
- (Wales) Will Reed to (England) Worcester Warriors
- (Moldova) Dmitri Arhip (released)
- (Wales) Joe Davies (released)
- (England) Lloyd Evans (released)
- (Wales) Ashton Hewitt (retired)
- (Tonga) Paula Latu to (New Zealand) Southland
- (Wales) Josh Reynolds (released)
- (Wales) Jordan Williams (released)
- (Wales) George Young (released)
- (Australia) Harry Wilson (released)
- (Wales) George Nott to (Wales) Cardiff
- (Australia) Steve Cummins to (Japan) Urayasu D-Rocks
- (Tonga) Solomone Funaki (released)

== Edinburgh ==
=== Players in ===
- (Scotland) Dylan Richardson from (South Africa) Sharks
- (England) Rhys Litterick from (Wales) Cardiff
- (England) James Whitcombe from (England) Leicester Tigers
- (Scotland) Finlay Doyle from (England) Loughborough Students RUFC
- (England) Malelili Satala from (England) Leicester Tigers
- (England) Piers O'Conor from (Ireland) Connacht
- (England) Charlie McCaig from (England) Exeter Chiefs
- (Scotland) Ben White from (Scotland) Melrose
- (Scotland) Callum Hunter-Hill from (England) Northampton Saints
- (Scotland) Ross McKnight from (Scotland) Stirling County

=== Players out ===
- (Scotland) Jamie Ritchie to (France) Perpignan
- (Scotland) Dave Cherry to (France) Vannes
- (Scotland) Matt Scott (retired)
- (Scotland) Jacob Henry to (England) Coventry
- (Scotland) Jack Hocking (released)
- (Scotland) Nathan Sweeney (retired)
- (Scotland) Javan Sebastian to (Wales) Cardiff
- (Scotland) Ali Price to (France) Montpellier
- (Scotland) Robin Hislop (retired)
- (Scotland) Jamie Hodgson to (England) Newcastle Red Bulls
- (Argentina) Emiliano Boffelli to (Argentina) Duendes
- (Scotland) Mark Bennett to (United States) Seattle Seawolves

== Glasgow Warriors ==
=== Players in ===
- (Scotland) Duncan Munn (promoted from Academy)
- (Scotland) Alex Craig from (Wales) Scarlets
- (Australia) Charlie Savala from (England) Northampton Saints
- (England) Dan Lancaster from (France) Racing 92
- (Australia) Tavi Tuipulotu from (Australia) NSW Waratahs

=== Players out ===
- (Scotland) Tom Jordan to (England) Bristol Bears
- (South Africa) Henco Venter to (France) Brive
- (Scotland) Amena Caqusau to (England) Northampton Saints
- (Scotland) Jack Mann to (England) Gloucester
- (Scotland) Logan Trotter (released)
- (Scotland) Aidan Cross to (England) Doncaster Knights
- (Scotland) Callum Smyth to (England) Worcester Warriors
- (Scotland) Richie Simpson to (England) Ealing Trailfinders
- (Argentina) Sebastián Cancelliere to (Argentina) Hindú
- (Scotland) Sean Kennedy to (Scotland) Stirling County
- (South Africa) JP du Preez to (Japan) NTT DoCoMo Red Hurricanes
- (Argentina) Facundo Cordero to (Argentina) Regatas
- (Scotland) Callum Norrie to (England) Ampthill

== Leinster ==
=== Players in ===
- (Ireland) Fintan Gunne (promoted from Academy)
- (Ireland) Gus McCarthy (promoted from Academy)
- (Ireland) Andrew Osborne (promoted from Academy)
- (Ireland) Diarmuid Mangan (promoted from Academy)
- (Ireland) Niall Smyth (promoted from Academy)
- (Ireland) Hugh Cooney (promoted from Academy)
- (Ireland) Alex Usanov (promoted from Academy)
- (Ireland) Charlie Tector (promoted from Academy)
- (New Zealand) Rieko Ioane from (New Zealand) Blues (short-term deal)
- (Ireland) Ed Byrne from (Wales) Cardiff (short-term loan)

=== Players out ===
- (New Zealand) Jordie Barrett to (New Zealand) Hurricanes
- (Ireland) Lee Barron to (Ireland) Munster
- (Ireland) Michael Milne to (Ireland) Munster
- (Ireland) Ross Byrne to (England) Gloucester
- (Ireland) Cian Healy (retired)
- (Ireland) Ben Brownlee to (New Zealand) North Harbour
- (Ireland) Liam Turner to (France) Nevers
- (Ireland) Rob Russell to (England) Gloucester
- (Ireland) Rory McGuire to (Ireland) Ulster
- (Ireland) Aitzol King to (Ireland) Ulster

== Lions ==
=== Players in ===
- (South Africa) Eduan Keyter from (South Africa) Sharks
- (South Africa) Angelo Davids from (South Africa) Stormers
- (South Africa) Dylan Sjoblom from (South Africa) Griquas
- (South Africa) Chris Smith from (France) Oyonnax
- (South Africa) Batho Hlekani from (South Africa) Sharks

=== Players out ===
- (South Africa) Marius Louw to (England) Sale Sharks
- (South Africa) Edwill van der Merwe to (South Africa) Sharks
- (South Africa) Zander du Plessis to (South Africa) Cheetahs
- (South Africa) Jaco Visagie (retired)

== Munster ==
=== Players in ===
- (Ireland) Lee Barron from (Ireland) Leinster
- (Ireland) Michael Milne from (Ireland) Leinster
- (England) Dan Kelly from (England) Leicester Tigers
- (Ireland) JJ Hanrahan from (Ireland) Connacht
- (Ireland) Andrew Smith from (Ireland) Connacht
- (Ireland) Kieran Ryan (promoted from Academy)
- (Ireland) Evan O'Connell (promoted from Academy)
- (Ireland) Ruadhán Quinn (promoted from Academy)
- (Ireland) Fionn Gibbons (promoted from Academy)
- (Samoa) Michael Alaalatoa from (France) Clermont
- (New Zealand) Ben O'Donovan from (New Zealand) Canterbury

=== Players out ===
- (Ireland) Peter O'Mahony (retired)
- (Ireland) Stephen Archer (retired)
- (Ireland) Dave Kilcoyne (retired)
- (Ireland) Liam Coombes (released)
- (Ireland) Jack Daly (released)
- (Ireland) Jack Oliver (released)
- (Ireland) Patrick Campbell to (England) Ealing Trailfinders
- (Ireland) Scott Buckley to (England) Ealing Trailfinders
- (Ireland) Billy Burns to (Japan) Shimizu Koto Blue Sharks
- (Ireland) Cian Hurley to (New Zealand) Southland
- (Ireland) Rory Scannell to (England) Ealing Trailfinders
- (Ireland) Conor Murray (retired)

== Ospreys ==
=== Players in ===
- (Australia) Ryan Smith from (Australia) Queensland Reds
- (Wales) Ross Moriarty from (France) Brive
- (Wales) Efan Daniel from (Wales) Cardiff
- (Wales) Harri Williams from (England) Ampthill

=== Players out ===
- (Wales) Justin Tipuric (retired)
- (Wales) Tristan Davies to (Wales) Scarlets
- (Wales) Owen Williams to (France) Nissa
- (Fiji) Waisea Nayacalevu to (France) Nissa
- (Wales) Adam Beard to (France) Montpellier
- (England) George McGuigan to (England) Newcastle Red Bulls
- (England) Will Spencer to (France) Chambéry

== Scarlets ==
=== Players in ===
- (Wales) Joe Hawkins from (England) Exeter Chiefs
- (Wales) Jake Ball (unattached)
- (Wales) Dane Blacker from (Wales) Dragons
- (England) Ioan Jones from (England) Gloucester
- (Wales) Tristan Davies from (Wales) Ospreys
- (Wales) Sam O'Connor (promoted from Academy)
- (Wales) Kirby Myhill from (United States) Miami Sharks (short-term loan)
- (Australia) Steve Cummins from (Wales) Dragons (short-term loan)
- (New Zealand) Fletcher Anderson from (New Zealand) Crusaders
- (England) Harvey Cuckson from (England) Bath (short-term loan)
- (England) Alex Groves from (South Africa) Stormers (short-term loan)
- (Wales) Billy McBryde from (Wales) RGC 1404 (short-term loan)

=== Players out ===
- (Wales) Ioan Lloyd to (Wales) Cardiff
- (Scotland) Alex Craig to (Scotland) Glasgow Warriors
- (England) Charlie Titcombe to (England) Leicester Tigers
- (Wales) Sam Wainwright to (Wales) Cardiff
- (England) Ed Scragg to (England) Blackheath
- (Tonga) Vaea Fifita to (France) Montauban
- (Wales) Morgan Jones to (England) Doncaster Knights
- (Wales) Shaun Evans to (Wales) Carmarthen Quins
- (Wales) Steff Evans to (Wales) Carmarthen Quins
- (Wales) Efan Jones to (England) Ampthill

== Sharks ==
=== Players in ===
- (South Africa) Edwill van der Merwe from (South Africa) Lions
- (South Africa) Marvin Orie from (France) Perpignan
- (South Africa) Cameron Dawson from (South Africa) Pumas (short-term loan)
- (South Africa) Cebo Dlamini from (South Africa) Pumas (short-term loan)
- (Canada) Ross Braude from (South Africa) Pumas
- (South Africa) Eduan Swart from (South Africa) Pumas
- (South Africa) Simphiwe Matanzima from (South Africa) Bulls
- (South Africa) JJ Scheepers from (South Africa) Pumas (short-term loan)
- (Namibia) Le Roux Malan from (United States) New England Free Jacks
- (South Africa) George Whitehead from (South Africa) Griquas (short-term loan)
- (South Africa) Cameron Dawson from (South Africa) Cheetahs

=== Players out ===
- (South Africa) Ntuthuko Mchunu to (South Africa) Stormers
- (South Africa) James Venter to (England) Gloucester
- (Scotland) Dylan Richardson to (Scotland) Edinburgh
- (South Africa) Eduan Keyter to (South Africa) Lions
- (South Africa) Batho Hlekani to (South Africa) Lions
- (South Africa) Cameron Wright to (France) Narbonne
- (South Africa) Khwezi Mona to (England) Exeter Chiefs
- Christie Grobbelaar to South Africa Sevens
- (South Africa) Dian Bleuler to (England) Gloucester
- (South Africa) Lukhanyo Am to (Japan) Mitsubishi Sagamihara DynaBoars

== Stormers ==
=== Players in ===
- (South Africa) Cobus Reinach from (France) Montpellier
- (South Africa) Ntuthuko Mchunu from (South Africa) Sharks
- (South Africa) Ruan Ackermann from (England) Gloucester
- (South Africa) Hencus van Wyk from (South Africa) Cheetahs
- (Scotland) Oli Kebble from (France) Oyonnax
- (South Africa) Vernon Paulo from (South Africa) Cheetahs
- (South Africa) Hacjivah Dayimani from (France) Racing 92

=== Players out ===
- (South Africa) Herschel Jantjies to (France) Bayonne
- (South Africa) Brok Harris (retired)
- (England) Ben Loader to (England) Gloucester
- (South Africa) Joseph Dweba to (England) Exeter Chiefs
- (South Africa) Paul de Wet to (South Africa) Bulls
- (South Africa) Angelo Davids to (South Africa) Lions
- (South Africa) Manie Libbok to (Japan) Hanazono Kintetsu Liners

== Ulster ==
=== Players in ===
- (South Africa) Juarno Augustus from (England) Northampton Saints
- (Ireland) Joe Hopes (promoted from Academy)
- (Ireland) Charlie Irvine (promoted from Academy)
- (England) Sam Crean from (England) Saracens
- (Ireland) Rory McGuire from (Ireland) Leinster
- (Australia) Angus Bell from (Australia) NSW Waratahs (short-term deal)
- (Ireland) Jack Murphy (promoted from Academy)
- (Ireland) Bradley McNamara from (Ireland) Instonians (short term injury cover)

=== Players out ===
- (Ireland) Kieran Treadwell to (England) Harlequins
- (Ireland) John Cooney to (France) Brive
- (Ireland) Reuben Crothers (retired)
- (Ireland) Corrie Barrett (released)
- (Ireland) Alan O'Connor (retired)
- (Ireland) Andrew Warwick (retired)
- (New Zealand) Aidan Morgan to (Japan) Toyota Verblitz
- (Ireland) Stewart Moore to (England) Newcastle Red Bulls (loan)
- (Ireland) Michael McDonald to (Australia) NSW Waratahs

== Zebre Parma ==
=== Players in ===
- (Italy) Francesco Ruffolo from (Italy) Colorno
- (Italy) David Odiase from (France) Oyonnax
- (Italy) Giulio Bertaccini from (Italy) Valorugby Emilia
- (Italy) Albert Einstein Batista from (Italy) Colorno
- (Italy) Mirko Belloni from (Italy) Rovigo
- (Italy) Samuele Locatelli from (Italy) Viadana
- (Argentina) Martin Roger Farias from (Italy) Viadana
- (Italy) Alessandro Ortombina from (France) Perpignan
- (Italy) Marco Zanon from (Italy) Benetton
- (Argentina) Franco Carrera from (Argentina) Pampas XV
- (Italy) Malik Faissal (promoted from Academy)
- (Italy) Giacomo Milano (promoted from Academy)
- (United States) Shilo Klein from (United States) San Diego Legion
- (Argentina) Enrique Pieretto from (France) Provence

=== Players out ===
- (Italy) Danilo Fischetti to (England) Northampton Saints
- (Italy) Andrea Zambonin to (England) Exeter Chiefs
- (Italy) Luca Bigi to (Italy) Valorugby Emilia
- (Italy) Filippo Bozzoni to (Italy) Colorno
- (Tonga) Fetuli Paea to (Wales) Dragons
- (Argentina) Gerónimo Prisciantelli to (France) Racing 92
- (New Zealand) Scott Gregory to (New Zealand) Southland
- (Italy) Ratko Jelic to (Italy) Viadana
- (Fiji) Rusiate Nasove to (Italy) Valorugby Emilia
- (Italy) Luca Andreani to (Italy) Fiamme Oro
- (Italy) Samuele Taddei to (Italy) Valorugby Emilia
- (Italy) Giacomo Milano to (Italy) Valorugby Emilia

== See also ==
- List of 2025–26 Premiership Rugby transfers
- List of 2025–26 Champ Rugby transfers
- List of 2025–26 Super Rugby transfers
- List of 2025–26 Top 14 transfers
- List of 2025–26 Rugby Pro D2 transfers
- List of 2025–26 Major League Rugby transfers
