= 2026–27 Scarlets season =

Scarlets
- 2026–27 season
- Head coach: Dwayne Peel
- Chairman: Simon Muderack

The 2026–27 season is scheduled to be the 24th in the history of the Scarlets, a Welsh regional rugby union side based in Llanelli, Carmarthenshire. In this season, they will compete in the United Rugby Championship, its URC Welsh Shield competition and the EPCR Challenge Cup.

== Friendlies ==
Date	Opponents	H / A	Result F–A	Scorers	Attendance
5 September 2026	Exeter Chiefs	A	36–15	Tries: Page (2) 28' c, 66' m, J. Roberts (2) 40' c, 68' m, McDonald 52' m, Davis 71' c Conversions: McDonald (3) 28', 40', 71'	
11 September 2026	Dragons	H (Note: Game played at the Church Bank ground in Llandovery.)	14–80	Tries: I. Jones 15' c, S. O'Connor 25' c Conversions: Anscombe (2) 15', 22'	
18 September 2026	Saracens	H	14–26	Tries: James 21' c, Morse 72' c Conversions: Costelow 21', Anscombe 72'	

== United Rugby Championship ==
=== League phase ===
==== Fixtures ====
The fixture schedule for the 2026–27 United Rugby Championship season was announced on 19 May 2026.

Date	Opponents	H / A	Result F–A	Scorers	Attendance	Table position
26 September 2026	Cardiff Rugby	H	15–21	Tries: Roberts 6' m, Murray 23' c Conversions: Anscombe 24'; Penalties: Hawkins 52'	7,073	13th
3 October 2026	Dragons	A	26–38	Tries: Page (2) 2' c, 28' c, S. O'Connor 58' c, Jones 73' m Conversions: Costelow (3) 3', 29', 59'	7,163	14th
10 October 2026	Benetton	H	27–26	Tries: Lousi 4' c, Murray 53' c, Mee (2) 56' m, 65' m Conversions: Costelow (2) 5', 54'; Penalties: Costelow 79'	6,026	12th
24 October 2026	Stormers	A	40–52	Tries: Roberts (3) 19' c, 46' c, 65' c, Jones 31' c, Page 42' c, Macleod 60' m Conversions: Leggatt-Jones (5) 20', 32', 43', 47', 66'	16,921	14th
31 October 2026	Bulls	A	26–54	Tries: McKee 30' m, Lousi 36' c, Hughes 51' c, Roberts 55' c Conversions: Leggatt-Jones (3) 37', 52', 56'	9,026	14th
5 December 2026	Connacht	H				
18 December 2026	Munster	A				
26 December 2026	Ospreys	A				
2 January 2027	Dragons	H				
22 January 2027	Glasgow Warriors	A				
30 January 2027	Edinburgh	H				
27 February 2027	Zebre	A				
20 March 2027	Lions	H				
26 March 2027	Leinster	H				
17 April 2027	Ulster	A				
24 April 2027	Sharks	H				
8 May 2027	Ospreys	H				
15 May 2027	Cardiff Rugby	A				

==== Tables ====
Overall

Pos	Team	Pld	W	D	L	PF	PA	PD	TF	TA	TB	LB	Pts	Qualification
1	Glasgow Warriors	5	4	1	0	148	112	+36	22	15	5	0	23	Qualification for the Champions Cup and knockout stage
2	Edinburgh	4	4	0	0	111	64	+47	15	8	3	0	19	Qualification for the Champions Cup and knockout stage
3	Leinster	5	3	0	2	149	81	+68	23	11	4	2	18	Qualification for the Champions Cup and knockout stage
4	Bulls	4	3	0	1	160	90	+70	23	11	3	1	16	Qualification for the Champions Cup and knockout stage
5	Stormers	4	3	0	1	133	94	+39	19	13	3	1	16	Qualification for the Champions Cup and knockout stage
6	Sharks	4	3	0	1	125	104	+21	18	16	3	0	15	Qualification for the Champions Cup and knockout stage
7	Ospreys	4	2	0	2	112	121	−9	18	17	3	0	11	Qualification for the Champions Cup and knockout stage
8	Connacht	5	2	0	3	109	161	−52	18	24	2	0	10	Qualification for the Champions Cup and knockout stage
9	Munster	4	1	1	2	90	98	−8	12	15	2	2	10	Qualification for the Challenge Cup
10	Cardiff	4	2	0	2	87	107	−20	13	17	1	0	9	Qualification for the Challenge Cup
11	Lions	5	2	0	3	107	162	−55	15	25	1	0	9	Qualification for the Challenge Cup
12	Ulster	4	0	2	2	114	127	−13	17	17	4	1	9	Qualification for the Challenge Cup
13	Dragons	4	1	1	2	102	114	−12	15	18	2	1	9	Qualification for the Challenge Cup
14	Scarlets	4	1	0	3	108	137	−29	16	21	3	1	8	Qualification for the Challenge Cup
15	Benetton	4	0	1	3	84	92	−8	12	15	1	3	6	Qualification for the Challenge Cup
16	Zebre	4	0	0	4	79	164	−85	12	25	2	0	2	Qualification for the Challenge Cup

Updated to match(es) played on 23 October 2026. Source: UnitedRugby.com
Rules for classification: Tiebreakers for teams tied on points: 1) Number of matches won 2) The difference between points for and points against 3) The number of tries scored 4) The most points scored 5) The difference between tries for and tries against 6) The fewest red cards received 7) The fewest yellow cards received.

Welsh Shield

2026–27 United Rugby Championship Regional Shield tables
(Wales) Welsh Shield
	Team	P	W	D	L	PF	PA	PD	TF	TA	TBP	LBP	Pts	Pos overall
1	(Wales) Dragons	2	1	0	1	69	64	+5	10	10	2	1	7	6
2	(Wales) Ospreys	1	1	0	0	38	31	+7	6	4	1	0	5	10
3	(Wales) Cardiff	1	1	0	0	21	15	+6	3	2	0	0	4	3
4	(Wales) Scarlets	2	0	0	2	41	59	–18	6	9	1	1	2	15
If teams are level at any stage, tiebreakers are applied in the following order: 1. number of matches won 2. the difference between points for and points against 3. the number of tries scored 4. the most points scored 5. the difference between tries for and tries against 6. the fewest red cards received 7. the fewest yellow cards received
Green background indicates teams currently leading the regional shield. Upon the conclusion of the regular season, these teams win their respective regional shields. (S) : URC Shield champion

== EPCR Challenge Cup ==
Having finished in 14th in the 2025–26 United Rugby Championship, the Scarlets qualified for the 2026–27 EPCR Challenge Cup. The draw for the pool stage took place on 1 July 2026; the Scarlets were drawn into pool 2 along with fellow URC sides Benetton and Sharks, French Top 14 sides Lyon OU and Castres, and English PREM Rugby side Newcastle Red Bulls.

Teams will play four pool matches, the first taking place on the weekend of 16 October 2026.

=== Pool stage ===
==== Fixtures ====
Date	Opponents	H / A	Result F–A	Scorers	Attendance	Table position
17 October 2026	Newcastle Red Bulls	H	47–14	Tries: Costelow 12' c, Anderson 21' m, J. Williams 26' c, Davies 39' c, Mee 54' c, Page (2) 55' c, 65' c Conversions: Costelow (2) 13', 26', Hawkins (4) 40', 54', 56', 65'	5,269	1st
12 December 2026	Sharks	A				
9 January 2027	Lyon	H				
16 January 2027	Castres	A				

==== Table ====
EPCR Challenge Cup Pool 2
Pos	Team	Pld	W	D	L	PF	PA	PD	TF	TA	TB	LB	Pts	Qualification
1	(Wales) Scarlets	1	1	0	0	47	14	+33	7	2	1	0	5	Home round of 16
2	(France) Castres	1	1	0	0	18	9	+9	2	0	0	0	4	Home round of 16
3	(South Africa) Sharks	1	1	0	0	40	33	+7	6	5	0	0	4	Home round of 16
4	(France) Lyon	1	0	0	1	33	40	−7	5	6	0	1	1	Away round of 16
5	(Italy) Benetton	1	0	0	1	9	18	−9	0	2	0	0	0	
6	(England) Newcastle Red Bulls	1	0	0	1	14	47	−33	2	7	0	0	0	

First match(es) will be played: 17 October 2026. Source: EPCR
Rules for classification: Tiebreakers for teams tied on points: 1) Number of matches won; 2) Difference between points for and against; 3) Total number of points for; 4) Aggregate number of points scored in matches between tied teams; 5) Number of matches won excluding the first match, then the second and so on until the tie is settled.

== Transfers ==
=== In ===
Date confirmed	Pos.	Name	From	Ref.
30 April 2026	PR	(Wales) Corey Domachowski	Cardiff Rugby	
6 May 2026	LK	(England) Harvey Cuckson	(England) Bath	
14 May 2026	HK	(Ireland) John McKee	(Ireland) Leinster	
21 May 2026	HK	(Wales) George Roberts	Dragons	
4 June 2026	LK	(South Africa) Alex Groves	(South Africa) Stormers	
4 June 2026	FB	(New Zealand) Isaac Murray-Macgregor	(New Zealand) Crusaders	
26 June 2026	LK	(New Zealand) Cullen Grace	(New Zealand) Crusaders	
16 July 2026	LK	(New Zealand) Tom Allen	(New Zealand) Hurricanes	
28 July 2026	FH	(Wales) Gareth Anscombe	(France) Bayonne	
12 August 2026	PR	(New Zealand) Chris Apoua	(New Zealand) Moana Pasifika	

=== Out ===
Date confirmed	Pos.	Name	To	Ref.
20 February 2026	HK	(South Africa) Marnus van der Merwe	(Ireland) Munster	
10 April 2026	WG	(Wales) Tom Rogers	Ospreys	
30 April 2026	PR	(Scotland) Alec Hepburn	(Scotland) Edinburgh	
13 May 2026	LK	(Wales) Jake Ball	Retired	
13 May 2026	LK	(Australia) Max Douglas	(Japan) Shizuoka Blue Revs	
16 May 2026	N8	(Wales) Ben Williams	Pontypool RFC	
17 June 2026	LK	(South Africa) Jarrod Taylor	(England) Ealing Trailfinders	
4 September 2026	PR	(New Zealand) Chris Apoua	Released	
