= 2026–27 Stormers season =

Stormers
- 2026–27 season
- Head coach: John Dobson

The 2026–27 season is Stormers' sixth season in the United Rugby Championship, and in all formats of the competition. Along with competing in the URC and its South African Shield competition, the franchise will also participate in the 2026–27 European Rugby Champions Cup.

== Squad and management ==
John Dobson continues as the coach of the senior side.

=== Players in ===
- (South Africa) Wilco Louw from (South Africa) Bulls
- (South Africa) Siya Kolisi from (South Africa) Sharks
- (South Africa) Cheslin Kolbe from (Japan) Tokyo Sungoliath
- (South Africa) Haashim Pead from (South Africa) Lions
- (South Africa) André Warner from (United States) Seattle Seawolves (six-month loan)
- (South Africa) Bongi Mbonambi from (South Africa) Sharks

=== Players out ===
- (South Africa) Ruben van Heerden to (France) Montpellier
- (South Africa) Salmaan Moerat to (France) La Rochelle
- (South Africa) Scarra Ntubeni (retired)
- (South Africa) Dylan Maart to (South Africa) Bulls
- (South Africa) Alex Groves to (Wales) Scarlets
- (South Africa) Dan du Plessis to (France) Bordeaux
- (South Africa) Asad Moos to (South Africa) Lions
- (South Africa) Suleiman Hartzenberg to (South Africa) Sharks
- (South Africa) Jared Africa (released)
- (South Africa) Dewaldt Duvenage (retired)
- (South Africa) Frans Malherbe (released)
- (South Africa) Courtnall Skosan (retired)
- (South Africa) Ali Vermaak to (South Africa) Boland Cavaliers

== United Rugby Championship ==
=== Matches ===
The Stormers will begin their sixth URC campaign away to Irish side Connacht.

25 September	Connacht (Ireland)	15–29	(South Africa) Stormers (1 BP)	The Sportsground, Galway
	Try: Hansen 38' c Ioane 42' m Con: Gilbert (1/2) 39'; Pen: Gilbert 52'; Cards: Boyle (yellow card) 54'	Report; Scorecard; Highlights	Try: Gelant 20' c Sandi 57' c Paulo 78' m Ngobeni 80' c Con: Matthee (2/2) 21', 58'; Ahmed (1/2) 81'; Pen: Matthee 9'	Attendance: 7,243; Referee: Sam Grove-White (Scotland)

2 October	Edinburgh (Scotland)	17–13	(South Africa) Stormers (1 BP)	Edinburgh Rugby Stadium
	Try: Hill 58' c McHaffie 71' c Con: Grayson (2/2) 59', 72'; Pen: Grayson 6'; Cards: Douglas (yellow card) 63'	Report; Scorecard; Highlights	Try: Dayimani 66' c Con: Ahmed (1/1) 67'; Pen: Ahmed (2) 48', 51'; Cards: Senatla (yellow card) 58'	Attendance: 6,652; Referee: Eoghan Cross (Ireland)

10 October	(1 BP) Stormers (South Africa)	39–22	(South Africa) Sharks	Cape Town Stadium
	Try: Senatla 6'; Dayimani (2) 37' c, 47' c Zas 41' m Venter 43' c Kotze 64' m Con: Feinberg-Mngomezulu (3/6) 38', 44', 48'; Pen: Feinberg-Mngomezulu 13'	Report; Scorecard; Highlights	Try: Tshituka 15' m Romao 51' c Buthelezi 57' c Con: Lombard (2/3) 52', 58'; Pen: Lombard 31'; Cards: Romoa (yellow card) 36'; Tshituka (yellow card) 43'	Attendance: 42,368; Referee: Morné Ferreira (South Africa)

24 October	(1 BP) Stormers (South Africa)	52–40	(Wales) Scarlets (1 BP)	Cape Town Stadium
	Try: Porthen 11' m Pead 16' c Mchunu 28' c Senatla 34' c Fourie 42' c Reid 55' c Ahmed (2) 74' c, 80' m Con: Feinberg-Mngomezulu (6/8) 17', 29', 35', 42', 56', 75'	Report; Scorecard; Highlights	Try: Roberts (3) 19' c, 46' c, 65' c Jones 31' c Page 42' c Macleod 60' m Con: Leggatt-Jones (4/5) 20', 32', 43', 66'; Roberts (1/1) 47'; Cards: McKee (yellow card) 10'	Attendance: 16,921; Referee: Robbie Jenkinson

31 October 2026	Stormers (South Africa)	v	(Ireland) Ulster	Cape Town Stadium

5 December 2026	Sharks (South Africa)	v	(South Africa) Stormers	Kings Park Stadium, Durban

19 December 2026	Stormers (South Africa)	v	(South Africa) Lions	Cape Town Stadium

21 February 2027	Bulls (South Africa)	v	(South Africa) Stormers	Loftus Versfeld, Pretoria

3 January 2027	Stormers (South Africa)	v	(South Africa) Bulls	Cape Town Stadium

23 January 2027	Stormers (South Africa)	v	(Wales) Cardiff	Cape Town Stadium

30 January 2027	Stormers (South Africa)	v	(Italy) Zebre	Cape Town Stadium

27 February 2027	Lions (South Africa)	v	(South Africa) Stormers	Ellis Park Stadium, Jo'burg

19 March 2027	Glasgow Warriors (Scotland)	v	(South Africa) Stormers	Scotstoun Stadium

27 March 2027	Ospreys (Wales)	v	(South Africa) Stormers	St Helen's, Swansea

17 April 2027	Stormers (South Africa)	v	(Italy) Benetton	Cape Town Stadium

24 April 2027	Stormers (South Africa)	v	(Ireland) Munster	Cape Town Stadium

8 May 2027	Leinster (Ireland)	v	(South Africa) Stormers	RDS Arena, Dublin

15 May 2027	Dragons (Wales)	v	(South Africa) Stormers	Rodney Parade, Newport

=== Standings ===
Pos	Team	Pld	W	D	L	PF	PA	PD	TF	TA	TB	LB	Pts	Qualification
1	Glasgow Warriors	5	4	1	0	148	112	+36	22	15	5	0	23	Qualification for the Champions Cup and knockout stage
2	Edinburgh	4	4	0	0	111	64	+47	15	8	3	0	19	Qualification for the Champions Cup and knockout stage
3	Leinster	5	3	0	2	149	81	+68	23	11	4	2	18	Qualification for the Champions Cup and knockout stage
4	Bulls	4	3	0	1	160	90	+70	23	11	3	1	16	Qualification for the Champions Cup and knockout stage
5	Stormers	4	3	0	1	133	94	+39	19	13	3	1	16	Qualification for the Champions Cup and knockout stage
6	Sharks	4	3	0	1	125	104	+21	18	16	3	0	15	Qualification for the Champions Cup and knockout stage
7	Ospreys	4	2	0	2	112	121	−9	18	17	3	0	11	Qualification for the Champions Cup and knockout stage
8	Connacht	5	2	0	3	109	161	−52	18	24	2	0	10	Qualification for the Champions Cup and knockout stage
9	Munster	4	1	1	2	90	98	−8	12	15	2	2	10	Qualification for the Challenge Cup
10	Cardiff	4	2	0	2	87	107	−20	13	17	1	0	9	Qualification for the Challenge Cup
11	Lions	5	2	0	3	107	162	−55	15	25	1	0	9	Qualification for the Challenge Cup
12	Ulster	4	0	2	2	114	127	−13	17	17	4	1	9	Qualification for the Challenge Cup
13	Dragons	4	1	1	2	102	114	−12	15	18	2	1	9	Qualification for the Challenge Cup
14	Scarlets	4	1	0	3	108	137	−29	16	21	3	1	8	Qualification for the Challenge Cup
15	Benetton	4	0	1	3	84	92	−8	12	15	1	3	6	Qualification for the Challenge Cup
16	Zebre	4	0	0	4	79	164	−85	12	25	2	0	2	Qualification for the Challenge Cup

Updated to match(es) played on 23 October 2026. Source: UnitedRugby.com
Rules for classification: Tiebreakers for teams tied on points: 1) Number of matches won 2) The difference between points for and points against 3) The number of tries scored 4) The most points scored 5) The difference between tries for and tries against 6) The fewest red cards received 7) The fewest yellow cards received.

=== URC South African Shield ===
Stormers will enter the URC Shield seeking a third title, to add to the five Super Rugby South African conference titles they earned in that competition.

2026–27 United Rugby Championship Regional Shield tables
(South Africa) South African Shield
	Team	P	W	D	L	PF	PA	PD	TF	TA	TBP	LBP	Pts	Pos overall
1	(South Africa) Bulls	1	1	0	0	57	15	+42	9	2	1	0	5	3
2	(South Africa) Stormers	1	1	0	0	39	22	+17	6	3	1	0	5	4
3	(South Africa) Sharks	1	0	0	1	22	39	–17	3	6	0	0	0	6
4	(South Africa) Lions	1	0	0	1	15	57	–42	2	9	0	0	0	7
If teams are level at any stage, tiebreakers are applied in the following order: 1. number of matches won 2. the difference between points for and points against 3. the number of tries scored 4. the most points scored 5. the difference between tries for and tries against 6. the fewest red cards received 7. the fewest yellow cards received
Green background indicates teams currently leading the regional shield. Upon the conclusion of the regular season, these teams win their respective regional shields. (S) : URC Shield champion

== European Rugby Champions Cup ==
Having finished third in the 2025–26 United Rugby Championship, Stormers qualified for the 2026–27 European Rugby Champions Cup. The pool stage draw will take place on 1 July 2026.

=== Pool stage ===
European Rugby Champions Cup Pool 3
Pos	Team	Pld	W	D	L	PF	PA	PD	TF	TA	TB	LB	Pts	Qualification
1	(South Africa) Stormers	1	1	0	0	49	12	+37	7	2	1	0	5	Champions Cup round of 16.
2	(Ireland) Munster	1	1	0	0	33	25	+8	5	3	0	0	4	Champions Cup round of 16.
3	(England) Gloucester	1	0	1	0	36	36	0	5	5	0	0	2	Champions Cup round of 16.
4	(France) Bordeaux Bègles	1	0	1	0	36	36	0	5	5	0	0	2	Champions Cup or Challenge Cup round of 16 based on table points amongst non-top-three teams.
5	(France) Racing 92	1	0	0	1	25	33	−8	3	5	0	0	0	Champions Cup or Challenge Cup round of 16 based on table points amongst non-top-three teams.
6	(England) Bristol Bears	1	0	0	1	12	49	−37	2	7	0	0	0	Champions Cup or Challenge Cup round of 16 based on table points amongst non-top-three teams.

Updated to match(es) played on 17 October 2026. Source: EPCR
Rules for classification: Tiebreakers for teams tied on points: 1) Number of matches won; 2) Difference between points for and against; 3) Total number of points for; 4) Aggregate number of points scored in matches between tied teams; 5) Number of matches won excluding the first match, then the second and so on until the tie is settled.

=== Pool matches ===
17 October 2026	(1 BP) Stormers (South Africa)	49–12	(England) Bristol Bears	DHL Stadium, Cape Town
16:15	Try: Senatla 7' c Zas (2) 16' c, 78' c Roche (2) 29' c, 53' c Gelant 72' c Venter 74' c Con: Feinberg-Mngomezulu (7/7) 8', 17', 30', 54', 73', 75', 79'; Cards: JJ Kotze (red card) 34'; Zas (yellow card) 48'	Report; Scorecard; Highlights	Try: Owen 23' c Moody 51' m Con: Worsley (1/2) 24'	Attendance: 16,570; Referee: Kevin Bralley (France)

13 December 2026	Bordeaux Bègles (France)	v	(South Africa) Stormers	Stade Chaban-Delmas, Bordeaux
16:15

9 January 2027	Gloucester (England)	v	(South Africa) Stormers	Kingsholm Stadium, Gloucester
13:00

16 January 2027	Stormers (South Africa)	v	(France) Racing 92	DHL Stadium, Cape Town
17:15
