= South Nottinghamshire Academy =

Location
- Glebe Lane, off Cropwell Road; Radcliffe-on-Trent, Nottinghamshire; England; 52.9455°N 1.0329°W

Information
- Type: Academy
- Established: 1956, reconstituted 2011
- Trust: The Redhill Academy Trust (2016–)
- Department for Education URN: 137112 Tables
- Ofsted: Reports
- Gender: Mixed
- Age: 11 to 18
- Enrolment: approx. 700
- Website: http://southnottinghamshireacademy.org.uk/

South Nottinghamshire Academy is a mixed-sex secondary school with academy status located in the village of Radcliffe-on-Trent, in Nottinghamshire, England. The school intake covers pupils from ages 11 to 18, with the upper two years being catered for in the integrated sixth form centre.

The school was originally named Radcliffe-on-Trent Secondary Modern School, then Dayncourt Comprehensive School and latterly Dayncourt School. Dayncourt was awarded Specialist Sports College status in September 2002. In 2011 the school was formally closed and reconstituted on the same site as South Nottinghamshire Academy, formed in partnership with South Nottingham College (now Central College Nottingham). South Nottinghamshire Academy is a specialist school for both sports and mathematics.

== History ==
=== Origins and the Canadian influence ===
Radcliffe-on-Trent Secondary Modern School was completed in 1956, at a cost of £126,000 (approximately equivalent to £3,590,000 in 2024). The first intake of approximately 300 pupils were enrolled at the beginning of the new academic year that September. The school was officially opened on 6 November 1957 by Mr. S. D. Pierce, Deputy High Commissioner of Canada at the time. The Canadian association was apt, as one of the driving motivations for the development of the school was the presence of a sizeable expatriate Canadian population in the district, a product of the Royal Canadian Air Force's use of Langar airfield, 6.5 miles south-east of Radcliffe.

Of the initial intake roughly 20% were Canadian, with the majority of other students being drawn from the village of Radcliffe. As Canadian pupils commonly only attended the Radcliffe school while their parents were stationed at the air base, every effort was made to allow these students to move smoothly between the Canadian and British education systems: four of the initial teaching staff were themselves Canadian, and lessons and timetabling were adapted to better integrate the two regimes. However, the lower academic standards associated with the secondary modern curriculum were unpopular with Canadian parents, and the arrangement was under review only months after its inauguration. For many years the link between the two countries was symbolised by the presence of a large, 6 m totem pole placed on a lawn to the right of the main entrance. The pole was carved from a telegraph pole by a Canadian pupil at the school, Tim Barton, and was erected in 1963 as the Canadian families were leaving the area. It was accompanied by a smaller 2 m pole placed inside the entrance lobby itself. In the mid-1990s it was discovered that the original wooden pole had become dangerously rotten and so had to be removed. A replacement was constructed in fibreglass, and painted by staff and students of the school.

=== School expansion and a name change ===
In 1972 the school took on comprehensive status, and with it a greatly increased catchment area. Included alongside Radcliffe were the villages of Shelford, Holme Pierrepont and Gamston along the River Trent, Cotgrave to the south, and many smaller hamlets in the surrounding area. It was decided that the school name should be changed to better reflect this wider geographical spread.

No one identity linked these disparate communities. Social and cultural differences were distinctly apparent between agrarian villages such as Shelford and Gamston, the colliery village of Cotgrave, and commuter-dominated Radcliffe. The common practice of naming the school after the local manorial family was not possible as, although both the de Manvers and Pierrepont families were significant historical landholders in the preceding few hundred years, neither had held the area in its entirety. The only family to have done so were the De Aincurts, who held the land in the years following the Norman Conquest. Using the modern spelling of the name, it was agreed that the school should be renamed Dayncourt.

=== Specialist sports college ===
Sport played a role in Dayncourt's identity. Badminton World Champion Nathan Robertson is a former pupil, as is Nottingham R.F.C. fullback David Jackson. In September 2002 Dayncourt School was awarded Specialist Sports College status, after a campaign led by long-serving PE teachers Dave Bullas and John Jones. The decision marked a significant shift in the evolution of the school, and in particular its integration with the wider local community. Increases in funding which accompany the Sports College status, in addition to the ability to raise extra funding from third parties, saw a complete overhaul of school sporting facilities in the first few years of the new millennium. A grant of nearly £500,000 from the Football Foundation allowed the school to build a new all-weather pitch facility. Dave Bullas died unexpectedly on 10 December 2005, and the school decided to name this new facility in his memory. The Dave Bullas Sports Centre was opened by former Nottingham Forest player Steve Chettle on 9 July 2007. The school's swimming pool received a £40,000 refurbishment in mid-2010, partly funded by a government grant, but with a substantial portion of the cost raised through local fundraising by the Radcliffe-on-Trent Swimming Pool Association.

=== Academy ===
In September 2008 Dayncourt became a foundation school, and control for its budget and staffing was transferred from Nottinghamshire County Council to the school's governors. Despite the influx of money resulting from its specialist college status, Dayncourt's academic facilities were falling into disrepair in the first decade of the 21st century. Although having a capacity of over 1200 pupils, the school's roll dropped from 935 pupils in 2006 to around 500 in 2011, and it had built up a financial deficit of £1.16 million. In an attempt to defray costs, in 2010 the school entered into a partnership with South Nottingham College to share finance, marketing, IT support and maintenance services. The Head Teacher at the time, Tim Mitchell, was forced to cut a third of the teaching and support staff in an attempt to balance the books. Following the redundancies and other restructuring Dayncourt only narrowly avoided outright closure, but it was decided that the school should form the basis for a new academy, later named South Nottinghamshire Academy, operated in partnership with South Nottingham College as its sponsor. In order for the academy to take over the school's facilities Dayncourt was formally closed on 31 August 2011 and the new academy opened the next day. In addition to Dayncourt's existing sports specialism, South Nottinghamshire Academy has added specialism in mathematics. Academy sponsorship changed in September 2016 when the school joined the Redhill Academy Trust.

=== Renovations and new buildings ===
Work to rebuild the academy began in September 2014 and was completed for the 2016/2017 school year. The buildings which comprised the old Dayncourt School were demolished, with the exception of the sports hall, and the school's operations were condensed into a single three-storey building on the same site. A second teaching building, named 'The Maple Building' – constructed at a cost of £2.6 million, with capacity for a further 150 pupils – was opened in February 2023.

== School insignia ==
=== The Dayncourt badge ===
The Dayncourt badge

Dayncourt's school badge reflected many aspects of local and school history. The field colours of light blue and yellow were those of the De Aincurt family arms, dating back to before 1066. In the upper portion a black lion passant gardant represented both the Pierrepont and Manvers family crests; a black lion forms the central feature of both sets of insignia, although in each case the lion is depicted rampant. In the lower portion, blue lines were again borrowed from the De Aincurt escutcheon, but were given a wave to represent the River Trent, which runs along the northern border of the school's catchment area. Finally, the five black blocks represented the five major villages in the catchment area: Radcliffe-on-Trent, Cotgrave, Shelford, Holme Pierrepont and Gamston.

== Notable former pupils ==
=== Dayncourt School ===
- Nathan Robertson, World Badminton Champion (2006) and Olympic Silver Medallist (2004).
- Tom Graham, actor, played Tom Archer in the long-running BBC Radio 4 soap opera The Archers.
- David Jackson, Nottingham and Barbarians rugby union player.

=== South Nottinghamshire Academy ===
- Rhiannon May, actress, plays Cara Connolly in BBC One drama series Silent Witness.
- Ellis Mee, Welsh rugby union player, plays for Scarlets and the Wales national team.
- Liam Thompson, footballer, played for Derby County and Mansfield Town.
