= Jac Price =

Welsh rugby union player

- Born: 4 August 2000 (age 26) Carmarthen, Wales
- Height: 199 cm (6 ft 6 in)
- Weight: 114 kg (17 st 13 lb; 251 lb)
- School: Ysgol Bro Myrddin
- Notable relative: Elis Price (brother)

Rugby union career
- Position: Lock
- Current team: Scarlets
Youth career
- Carmarthen Quins
Senior career
Years	Team	Apps	(Points)
2020–	Scarlets	22	(5)
2021	→ Nottingham (loan)	5	(0)
- Correct as of 19 March 2023
International career
Years	Team	Apps	(Points)
2019–2020	Wales U20s	10	(0)
- Correct as of 9 November 2020

Jac Price (born 4 August 2000) is a Welsh rugby union player who plays for United Rugby Championship side Scarlets. His preferred position is lock.

== Professional career ==
Carmarthen–born Price attended Ysgol Bro Myrddin, and began his rugby career with local team Carmarthen Quins. He played for the Quins through all age grade levels, and represented their first team before featuring for the Scarlets.

In 2019, Price was selected for Wales U20 for the 2019 Six Nations Under 20s Championship. He was suspended after the first round, missing the following two matches. Price was selected for the 2019 World Rugby Under 20 Championship, and the 2020 Six Nations Under 20s Championship.

Price signed his first professional contract for Scarlets in August 2020. He made his Scarlets debut in Round 5 of the 2020–21 Pro14 against Zebre. In March 2021, Price joined Nottingham R.F.C. on loan, along with fellow Scarlets Harri O'Connor and Shaun Evans. Price made five appearances for the side, before returning to the Scarlets for the Pro14 Rainbow Cup. Price extended his contract with the Scarlets at the end of the season.

On 21 April 2023, Price signed another contract extension with the Scarlets, along with fellow lock Morgan Jones.

Price signed another extension with the Scarlets on 14 August 2025.

== Personal life ==
Price’s younger brother Elis has also represented Wales U20 and the Carmarthen Quins, while part of the Scarlets academy.
