= Gabe McDonald =

Welsh rugby union player

- Born: Gabe McDonald; 25 September 2004 (age 22) Burry Port, Wales
- Height: 188 cm (6 ft 2 in)
- Weight: 98 kg (216 lb)
- School: Coleg Sir Gâr

Rugby union career
- Position: Centre
- Current team: Scarlets
Youth career
- Burry Port
Senior career
| Years | Team | Apps | (Points) |
| 2023–2024 | Llandovery | 8 | (15) |
| 2024– | Carmarthen Quins | 47 | (73) |
| 2025– | Scarlets | 2 | (0) |

Gabe McDonald (born 26 September 2004) is a Welsh rugby union footballer who plays as a centre for the Scarlets.

== Club career ==
After beginning his career with Burry Port RFC, he joined the Scarlets Academy and played for the under-18 side before making his senior debut for Llandovery RFC in September 2023. He spent the first half of the 2023–24 season with Llandovery, scoring three tries in eight appearances, before moving to Carmarthen Quins RFC for the second half of the season, adding one more try in six appearances. He spent the next two seasons with Carmarthen Quins, scoring 10 more tries in 39 appearances, as well as kicking two conversions and a penalty during the 2025–26 season.

McDonald made his competitive senior debut for the Scarlets on 29 November 2025, coming off the bench in a 23–0 win at home to Glasgow Warriors. After being an unused substitute against Edinburgh on 27 February 2026, he came off the bench again to face Connacht on 13 March.

McDonald scored his first senior try for the Scarlets – as well as three conversions – in a pre-season friendly against Exeter Chiefs on 5 September 2026. On 11 September 2026, he signed a contract extension with the Scarlets. McDonald made his first competitive start on 31 October 2026, away to the Bulls.
