= Elis Price =

Welsh rugby union player

- Born: Elis Price; 20 December 2005 (age 20) Carmarthen, Wales
- Height: 193 cm (6 ft 4 in)
- Weight: 87 kg (192 lb)
- School: Coleg Sir Gâr
- Notable relative: Jac Price (brother)

Rugby union career
- Position: Outside half
- Current team: Scarlets
Youth career
- Carmarthen Quins
Senior career
Years	Team	Apps	(Points)
2024–	Carmarthen Quins	20	(75)
2025–	Scarlets	1	(0)
International career
Years	Team	Apps	(Points)
2024–2025	Wales U20	6	(2)

Elis Price (born 20 December 2005) is a Welsh rugby union player who plays for the Scarlets as an outside half.

== Early life ==
From Carmarthen, Price attended Coleg Sir Gâr, and played for Carmarthen Quins as a youth player.

== Club career ==
=== Carmarthen Quins ===
Price played for the Quins near the end of the 2023–24 Indigo Group Premiership.

Price featured for the Quins for the 2025–26 season, kicking a penalty with the last kick of the game to beat Cardiff, and converting a try to beat Newport RFC.

=== Scarlets ===
Price was named in the Scarlets extended academy for the 2022–23 season. He played for the Scarlets in a pre-season friendly against the Quins on 31 August 2024, playing alongside his older brother Jac, who also came through the Quins and Scarlets Academy. He then played for a Scarlets Development side against the Dragons in November 2024.

Price joined the senior academy for the 2025–26 season. Price was named on the bench for the Scarlets in their derby fixture against Cardiff on 19 December 2025 but did not make an appearance. He was named on the bench the following week against the Ospreys, and made his debut late in the second half. A foot injury in early 2026 prevented any further appearances for the remainder of the season. Ahead of the 2026–27 season, Price suffered an ACL injury that would rule him out for the season.

== International career ==
=== Wales U20 ===
During the 2024 Six Nations Under 20s Championship, Price was brought into the squad, and made his debut off the bench against France U20. He featured again in the tournament the following year.

For the 2025 World Rugby U20 Championship, Price started against Spain U20 and Italy U20.
