= Shaun Evans (rugby union) =

Welsh rugby union footballer

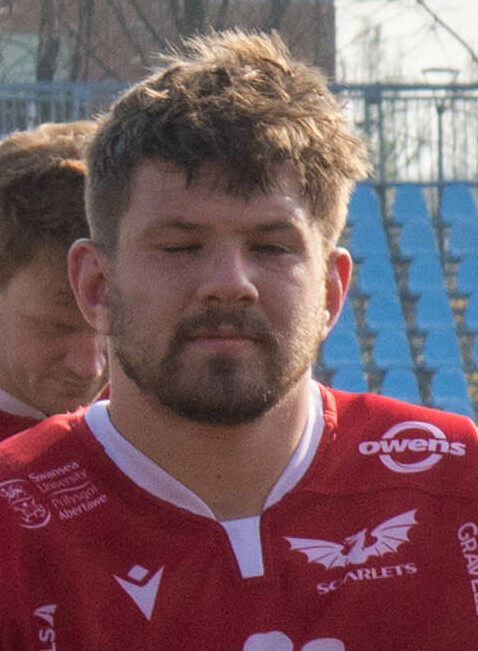
- Born: Shaun Evans; 14 September 1996 (age 30) Carmarthen, Wales
- Height: 183 cm (6 ft 0 in)
- Weight: 106 kg (16 st 10 lb; 234 lb)
- School: Bryngwyn School; Coleg Sir Gar
- University: Swansea University

Rugby union career
- Position: Hooker
Senior career
Years	Team	Apps	(Points)
2015–	Carmarthen Quins	70	(40)
2016–2025	Scarlets	62	(5)
2021	→ Nottingham (loan)	8	(5)
International career
Years	Team	Apps	(Points)
2016	Wales U20	8	(20)

Shaun Evans (born 14 September 1996) is a Welsh rugby union player who most recently played for United Rugby Championship team Scarlets as a hooker.

== Professional career ==
Evans played school rugby for Coleg Sir Gâr, and made his debut for the Carmarthen Quins in March 2015, establishing himself as a first team regular by the 2015–16 season. Evans earned a call-up to the Wales U20 squad for the 2016 Six Nations Under 20s Championship, where he scored three tries in five games as Wales won their first Grand Slam at this level. He earned another call-up for the 2016 World Rugby Under 20 Championship, where he made a further three appearances.

Evans earned his first professional contract with the Scarlets in 2016. Evans played for the Scarlets development side in the British and Irish Cup prior to making his competitive debut. On 14 April 2018, Evans made his full debut for the Scarlets, against Edinburgh.

In 2019, Evans underwent a positional change, moving from flanker to hooker. Evans joined Nottingham R.F.C. on loan in March 2021, along with fellow Scarlets Harri O'Connor and Jac Price. Evans made eight appearances for the side, scoring one try.

Evans was released by the Scarlets at the end of the 2024–25 United Rugby Championship.

Evans was confirmed as a member of the Quins squad for the 2025–26 Super Rygbi Cymru season, and named as the team captain.
