= Rhys Litterick =

English rugby union player

- Born: 2 March 1999 (age 27) Worthing, West Sussex
- Height: 183 cm (6 ft 0 in)
- Weight: 120 kg (18 st 13 lb)

Rugby union career
- Position: Tighthead Prop
- Current team: Cardiff Rugby
Senior career
Years	Team	Apps	(Points)
2017-2021	Worthing RFC	67	(0)
2021-2023	Harlequins	6	(0)
2022-2023	→ Esher RFC (loan)	10	(0)
2023	→ London Scottish (loan)	10	(0)
2023	→ Dorking (loan)	10	(0)
2023-	Cardiff Rugby	34	(5)
- Correct as of 25 April 2025

Rhys Litterick (born 2 March 1999) is an English rugby union player who plays as a prop forward for Cardiff Rugby. He is Welsh and Scottish qualified.

== Career ==
From Sussex, Litterick played semi-professional rugby for Worthing RFC whilst working as a building site landscaper. He was due to sign for Blackheath F.C. in National League 1 but the deal fell through when the COVID-19 pandemic happened. In 2021, he signed for Harlequins on a six-month deal, and also played for Esher RFC on loan. He also played for London Scottish on loan, making his debut in February 2023. Litterick made six appearances in total for Harlequins before leaving at the end of the 2022-23 season. He was announced to be joining Cardiff Rugby in July 2023.

== Personal life ==
Litterick qualifies for Wales through his father Kevin, who is from Ogmore; as well as qualifying for Scotland. Litterick was reportedly mentored at Harlequins by Welsh front-row player Adam Jones.
