= Harri Williams =

Welsh rugby union player

- Born: 5 April 2003 (age 23)
- Height: 1.73 cm (1 in)
- Weight: 78 kg (172 lb)
- School: St Joseph's College

Rugby union career
- Position: Scrum-half
Senior career
Years	Team	Apps	(Points)
2019–2023	Scarlets		
2023–2024	Ampthill		
2024	Tuggeranong Vikings		
2025–	Ospreys		
National sevens team
Years	Team		Comps
2024-2025	Great Britain 7s		

Harri Williams (born 5 April 2003) is a Welsh professional rugby union footballer who plays as a scrum-half for Ospreys. He is a Great Britain international in Rugby Sevens.

== Club career ==
Educated at St Joseph's College in Ipswich, Williams began his rugby union career in the rugby academy at Northampton Saints, prior to joining Scarlets in 2019, where he was offered a five-year contract at the age of 16 years-old and made his debut while still a teenager. He joined English club Ampthill RUFC in the RFU Championship in 2023. He later also played for Tuggeranong Vikings in the ACTRU Premier Division in Canberra, Australia.

Williams joined Ospreys in July 2025. Despite an injury-hit season in which Williams made one appearance in the side’s 21-14 loss to Connacht Rugby in March 2026, he signed a new contract with the club in July 2026.

== International career ==
Williams represented Wales at Under-20 level on 12 occasions, making his debut in 2021 against Italy in the U20 Six Nations Championship, at the age of 18 years-old. Williams later played for the Great Britain national rugby sevens team in the 2024-25 SVNS.

== Personal life ==
Williams qualifies to play for Wales through his father. He was recommended to a Wales scout while a teenager at Northampton by Dusty Hare.
