= Ellis Mee =

Welsh rugby union player (born 2003)

- Born: 6 October 2003 (age 23) Nottingham, England
- Height: 1.93 m (6 ft 4 in)
- Weight: 92 kg (203 lb; 14 st 7 lb)
- School: South Nottinghamshire Academy
- University: Nottingham Trent University

Rugby union career
- Position(s): Wing, Full back
- Current team: Scarlets
Senior career
Years	Team	Apps	(Points)
2023–2024	Nottingham	22	(35)
2024–	Scarlets	37	(50)
- Correct as of 18 November 2026
International career
Years	Team	Apps	(Points)
2025–	Wales	12	(5)
- Correct as of 18 November 2026

Ellis Mee (born 6 October 2003) is a Welsh rugby union player who plays at wing or full-back for Scarlets and the Wales national team.

== Early life ==
Born in Nottingham, England, Mee moved to Adelaide, Australia as a child. He first played junior rugby while in Australia, and later played for Keyworth RFC and West Bridgford RFC upon returning to England. Mee attended Nottingham Trent University where he played for their team in the BUCS Super Rugby league, where he was spotted by Nottingham.

== Club career ==
=== Nottingham ===
Mee made his debut for Rugby Championship side Nottingham August 2023. He also featured in the Premiership Rugby Cup for the side, scoring a try against Saracens in September 2023. He was voted fans’ player, players’ player, and overall player of the 2023-24 season for Nottingham. During his time playing for Nottingham, Mee featured 22 times and scored seven tries.

=== Scarlets ===
He signed for Welsh United Rugby Championship side Scarlets in May 2024 after being scouted for Scarlets recruitment by James Davies.

Mee made his first appearance for the Scarlets on 31 August 2024 in a preseason friendly against the Carmarthen Quins. His competitive debut came on 21 September 2024 in the opening round of the 2024–25 United Rugby Championship, against Benetton. Mee scored his first try for the Scarlets on 21 December 2024, against the Ospreys and scored his second in the following fixture against the Dragons.

Mee also featured for Super Rygbi Cymru side Llandovery RFC.

In his first season with the Scarlets, Mee earned another award: coaches’ breakthrough player of the season.

Mee secured victory for the Scarlets over Ulster on 24 January 2026, scoring the match-winning try in the 83rd minute.

Mee signed a contract extension with the Scarlets on 30 October 2026, following a start to the 2026–27 season that saw him score twice against Benetton and once against Newcastle.

== International career ==
=== Wales ===
In January 2025, he was called-up by the Wales national rugby union team for the 2025 Six Nations Championship. Mee was named to start against Ireland in the third round of the tournament, completing a back three featuring Scarlets teammates Blair Murray and Tom Rogers. During the match, Mee had a potential try ruled out by the referee. Mee was not selected for the 2025 Wales rugby union tour of Japan. Despite not being selected in the initial squad for the 2025 end-of-year rugby union internationals, Mee was called up for the final fixture against South Africa.

Mee was named in the squad for the 2026 Six Nations by Steve Tandy.

== Personal life ==
Mee qualified for Wales through his mother, who is from Newport.
