= Morgan Jones (rugby union) =

Welsh rugby union player

- Born: 23 May 1999 (age 27) Nuneaton, Warwickshire, England
- Height: 1.99 m (6 ft 6 in)
- Weight: 110 kg (17 st; 240 lb)
- University: Swansea University

Rugby union career
- Position: Lock
Senior career
Years	Team	Apps	(Points)
2017–2025	Llandovery	39	(15)
2020–2025	Scarlets	63	(0)
2025–2026	Doncaster Knights	23	(10)
2026–	Llandovery	1	(0)
- Correct as of 13 September 2026
International career
Years	Team	Apps	(Points)
2018–2019	Wales U20s	6	(0)
- Correct as of 25 October 2020

Morgan Jones (born 23 May 1999) is a Welsh rugby union player, who most recently played for United Rugby Championship side Scarlets as a lock.

== Professional career ==
Born in Nuneaton, Jones was part of the Leicester Tigers academy until he was 18. After departing the club, Jones came into contact with the Welsh Exiles programme, qualifying for Wales through a Llanelli-born grandfather. Jones moved from the midlands to Llanelli, joining the Scarlets academy. While part of the academy, Jones attained in a degree on criminology and criminal justice at Swansea University.

Jones played for Wales U18, and made his Wales U20 debut during the 2018 Six Nations Under 20s Championship. An ankle injury ruled Jones out of the 2019 Six Nations Under 20s Championship, but he returned to the team for the 2019 World Rugby Under 20 Championship.

Making his debut in a preseason friendly against Jersey Reds in 2019, Jones signed his first professional contract for Scarlets in August 2020. He made his Scarlets debut in Round 3 of the 2020–21 Pro14 against Benetton. During the match, Jones received a red card, but upon review after the match, the card was rescinded. Jones extended his contract in April 2021.

On 21 April 2023, Jones signed another contract extension with the Scarlets, along with fellow lock Jac Price.

Jones was released by the Scarlets at the end of the 2024–25 United Rugby Championship. Jones later signed for Doncaster Knights.

Jones returned to Wales to play for Llandovery RFC after one season with Doncaster.
