= Tristan Davies (rugby union) =

Welsh rugby union player

- Born: 30 September 2001 (age 25) Neath, Wales
- Height: 193 cm (6 ft 4 in)
- Weight: 104 kg (229 lb; 16 st 5 lb)

Rugby union career
- Position: Flanker
- Current team: Scarlets
Senior career
Years	Team	Apps	(Points)
2022–2025	Ospreys	13	(0)
2024	→ Cheetahs		
2025–	Scarlets	2	(0)
- Correct as of 14 December 2025
International career
Years	Team	Apps	(Points)
2021	Wales U20	4	(0)
- Correct as of 14 December 2025

Tristan Davies (born 30 September 2001) is a Welsh rugby union player, who plays for the Scarlets in the United Rugby Championship. His preferred position is flanker.

== Early career ==
Davies was born in Neath and came through the Ospreys academy, captaining their U18 side in 2020. He played his junior rugby for Bryncoch RFC. He represented the Wales U20 side in 2021.

== Professional career ==
=== Ospreys ===
Davies made his professional debut for the Ospreys in round 7 of the 2022–23 United Rugby Championship against Connacht. It would be his only appearance of the season. Ahead of the 2023–24 United Rugby Championship, Davies signed a contract extension. During the season he would make five appearances, including starting against Montpellier, before joining the Cheetahs on loan for the 2024 SA Cup. After returning to Wales, Davies would appear in seven matches in the 2024/25 season before departing the club. In June 2025, it was confirmed he had signed with the Scarlets ahead of the 2025–26 United Rugby Championship.

=== Scarlets ===
Davies played in a pre-season friendly against the Dragons, before making his competitive debut against Munster.
