= Archie Hughes (rugby union) =

Welsh rugby union player

- Born: 14 February 2003 (age 23) Haverfordwest, Wales
- Height: 1.73 m (5 ft 8 in)
- Weight: 73 kg (11 st 7 lb; 161 lb)
- School: Llandovery College
- University: Swansea University

Rugby union career
- Position: Scrum-half
- Current team: Scarlets
Youth career
- Tenby RFC
Senior career
Years	Team	Apps	(Points)
2022–	Scarlets	21	(5)
International career
Years	Team	Apps	(Points)
2022–2023	Wales U20	11	(10)
- Correct as of 25 October 2023

Archie Hughes (born 14 February 2003) is a Welsh rugby union player, currently playing for United Rugby Championship side Scarlets as a scrum-half. Hughes made his Scarlets debut during the 2021–22 season, and has represented Wales U20 at multiple tournaments.

== Club career ==
=== Scarlets ===
Hughes played junior club rugby for Tenby RFC, and attended Llandovery College. A member of the Scarlets Academy, Hughes played for Scarlets U16 and U18. Hughes made his first appearance for the Scarlets on 4 September 2021, in a preseason friendly against Nottingham, scoring two tries as a substitute.

Hughes was named in the Scarlets squad for the 2021–22 season. He made his debut for the Scarlets in the re-arranged Round 6 of the 2021–22 United Rugby Championship against the Sharks.

On 8 June 2023, Hughes signed a contract extension with the Scarlets.

Hughes made his first professional start for the Scarlets, against ASM Clermont Auvergne on 13 January 2024.

Hughes was named as captain in a pre-season friendly against Leicester Tigers on 7 September 2024.

== International career ==
=== Wales U20 ===
In 2022, Hughes was called into the Wales U20 team, starting against Scotland in the 2022 Six Nations Under 20s Championship. The following year, he was selected again for the U20 side for the 2023 Six Nations Under 20s Championship.

Hughes was named in the Wales U20 squad for the 2023 Junior World Championship.

== Personal life ==
While in the Scarlets Academy, Hughes studied at Swansea University.
