= Dane Blacker =

Welsh rugby union footballer

- Born: Dane Blacker; 6 July 1998 (age 28) Ynysybwl, Wales
- Height: 1.74 m (5 ft 8 1/2 in)
- Weight: 78 kg (12 st 4 lb)
- School: Coleg y Cymoedd

Rugby union career
- Position: Scrum-half
- Current team: Scarlets
Amateur team(s)
Years	Team	Apps	(Points)
2016–2019	Pontypridd	34	
- Correct as of 22 June 2019
Senior career
Years	Team	Apps	(Points)
2016–2019	Cardiff Blues	7	(0)
2017	→Dragons	2	(0)
2019–2023	Scarlets	53	(75)
2023–2025	Dragons	34	(25)
2025–	Scarlets	0	(0)
- Correct as of 28 August 2025
International career
Years	Team	Apps	(Points)
- Wales U18
2017–2018	Wales U20	15	(15)
- Correct as of 22 June 2019
National sevens team
Years	Team		Comps
2018–2019	Wales 7's		3
- Correct as of 22 June 2019

Dane Blacker (born 6 July 1998) is a Welsh rugby union player who plays for Scarlets regional team as a scrum-half. He is a former Wales Under-20 international. Blacker has previously played for Cardiff Rugby and the Dragons.

== Club career ==
=== Cardiff Blues ===
Blacker came through the youth team at Pontypridd RFC, while a member of the Cardiff Blues academy. Blacker made his debut for the Cardiff Blues regional team in 2016.

=== Loan to Dragons ===
During the 2017–18 Pro14 season, Blacker joined the Dragons on a short term loan. He appeared twice, scoring on his debut against Ulster.

=== Scarlets ===
Ahead of the 2019/20 season, Blacker moved from Cardiff to the Scarlets. Despite competing for the starting shirt with Wales internationals Gareth Davies and Kieran Hardy, Blacker made more starts during the 2020–21 Pro14 season than any other scrum half for the Scarlets. During this season, he was also the Scarlets top try scorer, touching down six times. Blacker was voted Supporters Player of the Month back to back in April and May 2021. He once again won the award in December 2022.

=== Dragons ===
On 13 April 2023, it was announced that Blacker would join the Dragons for the 2023–24 season, his second stint with the club following his 2017 loan. He made his first appearance for the team in October 2023, in a friendly against his former team. His competitive debut came on 21 October 2023, coming off the bench against Edinburgh.

=== Return to Scarlets ===
Blacker rejoined the Scarlets ahead of the 2025–26 season, signing a contract on 7 May 2025.

== International career ==
=== Wales U20 ===
Blacker was part of the Wales U20 team, representing them in 2017 and 2018 in the U20 Six Nations and the World Rugby Under 20 Championship.

=== Wales Sevens ===
He has also represented Wales Sevens at numerous World Rugby Sevens Series events.

=== Wales ===
Blacker was selected in the Wales squad for the 2022 Autumn Internationals.

Blacker was named on the bench for the Wales team against Georgia for the test on 19 November 2022, but was not substituted on and therefore did not make his test debut. He was not selected for the final test against Australia.
