= Jake Ball (rugby union) =

Wales international rugby union player

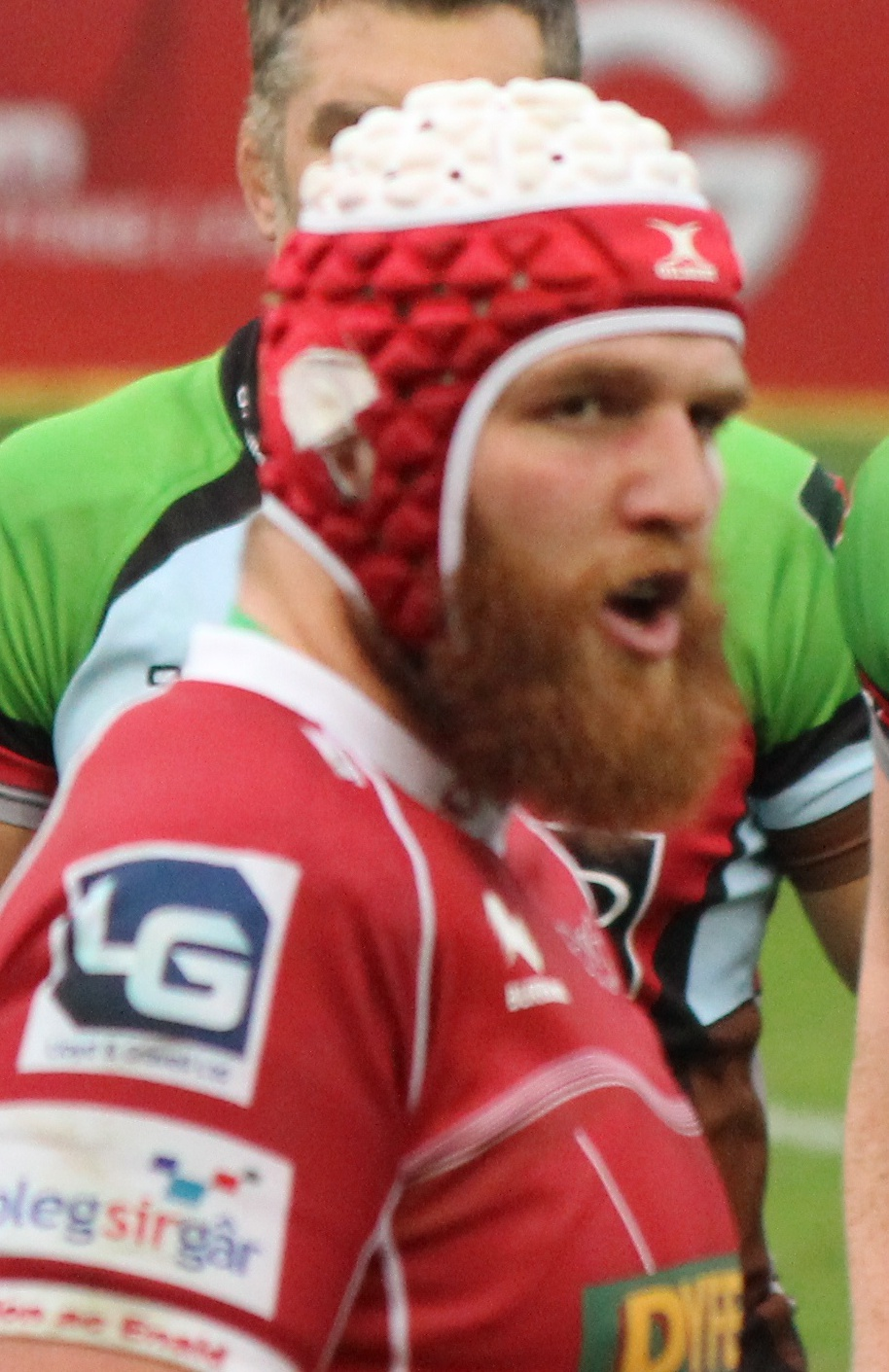
- Ball playing for the Scarlets
- Born: 21 June 1991 (age 35) Ascot, Berkshire, England
- Height: 1.99 m (6 ft 6 in)
- Weight: 121 kg (19 st 1 lb; 267 lb)

Rugby union career
- Position: Lock
Senior career
| Years | Team | Apps | (Points) |
| 2012–2013 | Llanelli RFC | 11 | (0) |
Provincial / State sides
| Years | Team | Apps | (Points) |
| 2012 | Western Force | 0 | (0) |
| 2012–2021 | Scarlets | 133 | (15) |
| 2021–2025 | Green Rockets Tokatsu | 32 | (0) |
| 2025–2026 | Scarlets | 13 | (0) |
- Correct as of 10 June 2026
International career
| Years | Team | Apps | (Points) |
| 2014–2021 | Wales | 50 | (0) |

Jake Ball (born 21 June 1991) is a professional rugby union player who plays as a lock. Ball played over 100 times for the Llanelli-based Scarlets regional side in Wales and was capped 50 times for the Wales national rugby union team. In 2021, Ball retired from international rugby to join the Japanese club Green Rockets Tokatsu, he later retired from all rugby after four years in Japan after the conclusion of the 2024–25 season, only to come out of retirement to rejoin the Scarlets for one final season playing rugby.

== Biography ==
Ball was born in Ascot, England, to a Welsh father from Pwllheli, North Wales. His father was a rugby player who played for the London-based clubs London Welsh RFC, and Harlequins. The Ball family migrated to Australia when he was 16, where they are now based in Perth, Western Australia, which is where his four children and wife live. A keen sportsman, Ball had played in the Australian under-19 cricket championship of 2008–09. After playing rugby professionally, Ball returned to Australia to work on his business Veritroo.

== Rugby career ==
=== Club ===
Ball began his professional rugby career in Perth with the Western Force, with whom he trained at the age of 21 in 2012. This experience led to Ball being signed on an initial three-year deal by Welsh regional team the Scarlets in 2012. Ball made his professional debut for the club on 15 September 2012, coming on as a 61st-minute replacement in the team's victory over Connacht in the Pro 12 tournament. During Ball's spell playing in Wales for the Scarlets, he had been a part of the 2016–17 Pro12 league winning season for the Welsh side.

After playing 133 games for the Scarlets, Ball moved to Japan in 2021 to play rugby for Green Rockets Tokatsu in the Japan Rugby League One. During November 2024, Ball announced he would be retiring at the end of the rugby season for 2024/25, by then he went on to play in 32 matches.

In April 2025, the Scarlets confirmed Ball would be returning to the club after a short-lived retirement. Ball went on to play 13 games in the 2025-26 season, making his tally for Scarlets 148, before retiring for the second time in May 2026.

=== International ===
Born in England, Ball was also eligible to play for Wales thanks to his father, who was born in Colwyn Bay. Ball said his move to the Scarlets in 2012 was motivated by a desire to play international rugby for Wales. He received his first call-up to the Wales squad in 2014, replacing the suspended Ian Evans ahead of the 2014 Six Nations Championship. He made his debut off the bench in the 26–3 loss to Ireland in week 2 of the tournament, before making his first test start in a 27–6 victory over France in Wales' third match. Later that year, Ball was selected for Wales' tour of South Africa, and in 2015, he played for Wales in their Rugby World Cup pool game against Uruguay.

Ball became a regular starter for Wales, until a dislocated shoulder suffered in an international against New Zealand in the 2017 Autumn internationals kept him off the field for 10 months. After his return, Ball played a part in Wales' Grand Slam-winning 2019 Six Nations Championship campaign, and later that year he featured prominently in the 2019 Rugby World Cup. Ball retired from international duty in 2021 having earned 50 caps.
