= Harvey Cuckson =

English rugby union player (born 2004)

- Born: 16 January 2004 (age 22) Chester, England
- Height: 2.01 m (6 ft 7 in)
- Weight: 120 kg (265 lb)
- School: Ellesmere College
- University: University of Bath

Rugby union career
- Position: Lock
- Current team: Bath
Senior career
Years	Team	Apps	(Points)
2024–	Bath	10	(0)
2025	→ Worcester Warriors (loan)	3	(5)
2025	→ Scarlets (loan)	5	(0)
2026–	Scarlets	0	(0)
International career
Years	Team	Apps	(Points)
2024	England U20	2	(0)

Harvey Cuckson (born 16 January 2004) is a professional rugby union footballer who plays as a lock for United Rugby Championship side Scarlets.

== Early life ==
Cuckson grew up in North Wales where he played junior rugby, and was later educated from the age of 13 years-old in Shropshire, England.

== Club career ==
=== Bath and Worcester ===
Cuckson was in the youth rugby pathway at Worcester Warriors prior to signing for Bath Rugby in December 2022. He featured for Bath in the Premiership Rugby Cup during the 2024-25 season, making his debut in a 73-0 win against Ampthill RUFC in November 2024. In May 2025, he had his contract extended by Bath.

At the start of the 2025-26 season, he joined the newly-reformed Worcester Warrior team on loan to play in the RFU Championship. He made his debut as a starter against Hartpury.

=== Loan to Scarlets ===
In October 2025, he joined United Rugby Championship side Scarlets on a short-term loan. He made his Scarlets debut away against Lions in the United Rugby Championship just days later starting alongside fellow emergency loan signing Alex Groves in the second row, on 17 October 2025, in a 29-18 defeat. After his loan initially concluded, Cuckson linked up again with the Scarlets in November.

=== Scarlets ===
On 6 May, Cuckson joined the Scarlets on a permanent contract for the 2026–27 season.

== International career ==
Also qualified for Wales, Cuckson made his England Under-18 debut in matches against France and Wales in 2022 before featuring that year in the U18 Six Nations Festival. Later that year, he was included in the NextGenXV list of the leading U18 players in the world.

He was included in the England U20 squad for the 2024 World Rugby U20 Championship and featured in the tournament in a 48-11 win against Fiji U20, but had to pull-out through injury after dislocating his shoulder during the tournament in South Africa.
