= Fletcher Anderson =

New Zealand rugby union player

- Born: 27 December 2002 (age 23) Christchurch, New Zealand
- Height: 187 cm (6 ft 2 in)
- Weight: 109 kg (17 st 2 lb; 240 lb)
- School: Christ's College
- University: University of Canterbury

Rugby union career
- Position(s): Flanker, Number 8
- Current team: Scarlets
Senior career
Years	Team	Apps	(Points)
2022–2025	Tasman	25	(5)
2024–2025	Crusaders	2	(0)
2025–	Scarlets		
- Correct as of 11 October 2025

Fletcher Anderson (born 27 December 2002) is a New Zealand rugby union player who plays for the Scarlets in the United Rugby Championship as a Number 8.

== Professional career ==
=== Crusaders and Tasman ===
Anderson was part of the Crusaders Academy in 2021 and 2022. He was named in the Tasman Mako squad for the 2022 Bunnings NPC as an injury replacement player. He made his debut in Round 4, coming off the bench against Canterbury. Anderson played club rugby in the Christchurch Metro Premier competition where he captained the UC Senior Team. He was selected for NZ Schools in 2020. He has played for the Crusaders U20 in both 2021 and 2022 and for NZ University in 2022. He won rookie of the year at the 2022 Mako awards.

In 2024, Anderson was named as one of the top prospects in New Zealand rugby.

Anderson won the 2025 Super Rugby Pacific tournament with the Crusaders. With the Mako, Anderson won Defender of the Year, Man of the Year, and Player of the Year.

=== Scarlets ===
Anderson signed with the Scarlets on 13 October 2025, linking up with the side in November. He made his debut on 21 November 2025, in a friendly against Harlequins, scoring a try. Anderson's competitive debut came on 29 November 2025, in a 23–0 defeat of Glasgow Warriors. He scored twice against Union Bordeaux Bègles, on 13 December 2025.

On 10 April 2026, Anderson signed an extension with the Scarlets, despite interest from other clubs. He has on occasion served as captain for the Scarlets. Anderson was recognised as the Players’ and Supporters’ Player of the Season.

== Personal life ==
Anderson studied Finance and Law at the University of Canterbury. In 2026, Anderson declared his desire to represent Wales when he attains international eligibility.
