= Carwyn Leggatt-Jones =

Welsh rugby union player

- Born: 28 November 2007 (age 18) Carmarthen, Wales
- Height: 1.72 m (5 ft 7 1/2 in)
- Weight: 84 kg (13 st 3 lb)
- School: Llandovery College

Rugby union career
- Position: Fly-half
- Current team: Scarlets
Senior career
Years	Team	Apps	(Points)
2025–	Scarlets	13	(35)
International career
Years	Team	Apps	(Points)
2025–	Wales U20	8	(69)

Carwyn Leggatt-Jones (born 28 November 2007) is a Welsh rugby union player who plays at fly-half for United Rugby Championship side Scarlets.

== Early life ==
Leggatt-Jones attended Llandovery College, and helped their rugby team win back to back titles in the Schools and Colleges league, in 2023 and 2024. In both finals, Leggatt-Jones was named as player of the match.

Leggatt-Jones was named as part of the Carmarthen Quins senior team for the first time in 2025.

== Club career ==
=== Scarlets ===
Leggatt-Jones came off the bench for the Scarlets on 21 November 2025, in a friendly against the Harlequins to make his club debut.

Leggatt-Jones made his URC debut for Scarlets on 29 November 2025 as a second-half replacement in the 23-0 victory over Glasgow Warriors, one day after his 18th birthday. He made his first start on 30 January 2026, against Benetton.

Leggatt-Jones signed his first senior contract with the Scarlets on 8 July 2026.

== International career ==
Having impressed for the Wales U18 and U19 age groups, Leggatt-Jones became the youngest debutant for Wales U20 when appearing as a replacement in the 2025 World Rugby U20 Championship warm up victory over Italy at 17 years and 200 days.

Leggatt-Jones was named in the squad for the 2026 Six Nations Under 20s Championship.
