= Harri O'Connor =

Welsh rugby union player

- Born: 25 October 2000 (age 26) Northallerton, England
- Height: 1.82 m (6 ft 0 in)
- Weight: 121 kg (267 lb; 19 st 1 lb)
- School: Llandovery College
- Notable relative: Sam O'Connor (brother)

Rugby union career
- Position: Prop
- Current team: Scarlets
Senior career
Years	Team	Apps	(Points)
2021	→ Nottingham (loan)	9	(0)
2022–	Scarlets	52	(0)
- Correct as of 16 March 2024
International career
Years	Team	Apps	(Points)
2020	Wales U20	2	(0)
2024–	Wales	5	(0)
- Correct as of 16 March 2024

Harri O'Connor (born 25 October 2000) is a professional rugby union player who plays as a prop for United Rugby Championship club Scarlets and the Wales national team.

== Club career ==
=== Scarlets ===
A member of the Dorchester Rugby Football Club youth side, O'Connor was part of the Bath academy, before being spotted by the WRU Exiles program and moving to Wales.

O'Connor was named in the Scarlets academy for the 2020–21 season. In March 2021, he joined RFU Championship side Nottingham on loan. He made his debut on 7 March against Ealing Trailfinders, coming on as a replacement.

O'Connor made his debut for the Scarlets on 16 October 2020 in a friendly against the Dragons. His professional debut came against the Ospreys on 1 January 2022.

On 4 April 2024, O’Connor signed a contract extension with the Scarlets.

During a preseason friendly, O’Connor suffered an Achilles injury, ruling him out of the majority of the 2024–25 season.

== International career ==
=== Wales U20 ===
O'Connor was named in the Wales U20 squad for the 2020 Six Nations Under 20s Championship, and made three appearances off the bench.

=== Wales ===
He was called up for the Wales national rugby union team on their June 2022 to South Africa, as a backup for Tomas Francis. O'Connor was not named in any of the match day squads.

On 2 November 2023, O’Connor was added to the Wales squad for the friendly against the Barbarians, and came off the bench in the second half of the uncapped match.

O'Connor was added to the squad for the 2024 Six Nations Championship ahead of the match against Ireland, following injuries in the squad. He made his debut on 17 March 2024, coming off the bench against Italy.

== Personal life ==
O'Connor was born in England, where his father was based for the British Army. His younger brother Sam is also a prop, and a member of the Scarlets academy.
