= Sam O'Connor (rugby union) =

Welsh rugby union player

- Born: 11 December 2001 (age 24)
- Height: 1.85 m (6 ft 1 in)
- Weight: 124 kg (19.5 st; 273 lb)
- School: Llandovery College
- Notable relative: Harri O'Connor (brother)

Rugby union career
- Position: Loosehead prop
- Current team: Scarlets
Senior career
Years	Team	Apps	(Points)
2021–2023	Llanelli	32	(0)
2022–	Scarlets	21	(0)
2023–	Carmarthen Quins	26	(15)
International career
Years	Team	Apps	(Points)
2019	Wales U18		

Sam O'Connor (born 11 December 2001) is a Welsh rugby union player who plays as a loosehead prop for the Scarlets.

== Professional career ==
O'Connor was part of the Bath academy, before joining the Welsh Exile programme. He moved to Wales to study at Llandovery College, while also signing a Scarlets academy contract.

In May 2022, O'Connor traveled to New Zealand to play for Linwood RFC in the northern off-season, along with fellow academy player Eddie James.

On 24 September 2022, O'Connor made his competitive debut for the Scarlets against Ulster, coming off the bench in the final minute to play alongside his brother Harri.

O'Connor started for the Scarlets in a friendly against Saracens on 10 March 2023.

While part of the Scarlets academy, O'Connor has also played for affiliated sides Llanelli RFC and Carmarthen Quins.

O'Connor has represented Wales U18.

O’Connor scored his first try for the Scarlets on 13 September 2024, as a replacement in a pre-season friendly against Saracens.

On 19 June 2025, O’Connor signed his first senior Scarlets contract, joining the first team for the 2025–26 United Rugby Championship.
