= Ioan Jones =

English rugby union player (born 2004)

- Born: 20 October 2004 (age 22) Gloucester, England
- Height: 1.81 m (5 ft 11 in)
- Weight: 80 kg (13 st; 180 lb)
- School: Katharine Lady Berkeley's School; Dean Close School

Rugby union career
- Position: Full-back
Senior career
Years	Team	Apps	(Points)
2023–2025	Gloucester	10	(5)
2025–	Scarlets		
- Correct as of 6 July 2025
International career
Years	Team	Apps	(Points)
2022–2023	England U18	8	(5)
2024	England U20	9	(10)
- Correct as of 19 July 2024

Ioan Jones (born 20 October 2004) is an English professional rugby union player who plays at full-back for the Scarlets in the United Rugby Championship.

== Early life ==
Jones was born in Gloucester. He grew up playing football as a central midfielder and was in the academies of EFL Championship sides West Bromwich Albion and Reading, before concentrating on rugby union. Jones played at Minchinhampton RFC up until U16 level, before being picked up by the Gloucester Rugby development pathway programme. He attended Katharine Lady Berkeley's School in Gloucestershire and Dean Close School in Cheltenham.

== Club career ==
=== Gloucester ===
Jones made his Gloucester Rugby debut in the Premiership Rugby Cup, coming off the bench to score the winning try away at Saracens in a 29-20 win in September 2023. He graduated from the club’s academy into the senior squad ahead of the 2024-25 season. Jones departed the club at the end of the 2024–25 Premiership Rugby season to join United Rugby Championship club the Scarlets.

=== Scarlets ===
Jones was named as a member of the Scarlets Senior Academy for the 2025–26 United Rugby Championship season. Jones was named on the bench for a pre-season friendly against Llandovery and Carmarthen Quins. Jones made his competitive debut on 27 February 2026, against Edinburgh. Jones scored his first try for the Scarlets on 13 March 2026, against Connacht.

Jones was promoted to the senior squad ahead of the 2026–27 season.

== International career ==
=== England U18 and U20 ===
Jones played for the England U18 side in 2022 and 2023. He was included in the England U20 side for the 2024 Junior Six Nations and scored his first try at that level in a win over Wales. He also scored another try in the last round at Stade du Hameau as England won the tournament.

Jones was a member of the England squad at the 2024 World Rugby U20 Championship and started in the final as they defeated France at Cape Town Stadium to become youth world champions.

== Personal life ==
Jones is eligible to play for Wales through his father.

== Honours ==
England U20

- World Rugby U20 Championship
  - (gold) Champion (1): 2024
- Six Nations Under 20s Championship
  - (gold) Champion (1): 2024
