= Alex Groves (rugby union) =

South African rugby union player

- Full name: Alexander Robert Mark Groves
- Born: 5 January 2001 (age 25) South Africa
- Height: 207 cm (6 ft 9 in)
- Weight: 120 kg (265 lb; 18 st 13 lb)
- School: St John's College

Rugby union career
- Position: Lock
- Current team: Scarlets
Senior career
| Years | Team | Apps | (Points) |
| 2020–2021 | Bristol Bears | 1 | (0) |
| 2021 | → Hartpury University | 4 | (0) |
| 2022–2025 | Sale Sharks | 11 | (0) |
| 2024–2025 | → Caldy | 6 | (0) |
| 2025–2026 | Western Province | | |
| 2025–2026 | Stormers | 1 | (0) |
| 2025 | → Scarlets (loan) | 2 | (0) |
| 2026– | Scarlets | 0 | (0) |
International career
| Years | Team | Apps | (Points) |
| 2020–2021 | England U20 | 5 | (0) |

Alex Groves (born 5 January 2001) is a South African rugby union player, who plays as a lock for United Rugby Championship club Scarlets.

== Early career ==
Groves was born in South Africa and attended St John's College where he played rugby and earned selection for the Lions at Craven Week in 2019. Groves is English qualified, and joined the Bristol Bears straight out of school in January 2020. He represented the England U20 side in 2021. In 2024, Groves was diagnosed with a heart condition and forced to have open-heart surgery.

== Professional career ==
Groves professional debut came with on dual-registration with Hartpury University in 2021. He would debut for the Bristol Bears against the Worcester Warriors in November 2021. In February 2022, he transferred to the Sale Sharks, debuting in March against Wasps, however he was ineligible for this fixture with Sale receiving a points deduction. Over the next two seasons, he would make eight further appearances for Sale, including one in the Premiership against Newcastle Falcons. Having recovered from open-heart surgery in early 2024, he returned to rugby on loan with Caldy, making six appearances for the side. He would make two more appearances for Sale also before departing at the end of the 2024/25 season.

Having departed Sale, Groves returned to South Africa, signing with the Stormers. He would first represent the Western Province side in the 2025 Currie Cup Premier Division. Having been named in the Stormers squad for the 2025/26 season, he would join the Scarlets on loan for two fixtures in October 2025. He would make his debut for the Stormers in round 3 of the 2025–26 European Rugby Champions Cup against the Harlequins.

Ahead of the 2026–27 season, Groves rejoined the Scarlets, this time on a permanent contract.
